= List of Singapore's football leagues winners =

Football in Singapore dates back to the late 19th century, when Singapore was a British colony. The Football Association of Singapore was formed in 1892, and the first national league competition took place in 1904.

The league system in Singapore has been re-organised several times by the Football Association of Singapore (FAS) since 1975.

Currently, the top level in Singapore is the Singapore Premier League (SPL). Below that are Singapore Football League 1 (SFL1) and Singapore Football League 2 (SFL2), the second and third levels. At the fourth level is the Island Wide League.

The winners and runners up of league competitions organised by the FAS are set out below.

== Men's national leagues ==
The national leagues in Singapore are currently the Singapore Premier League, the Singapore Football League (which consists of two divisions) and the Island Wide League.

=== Top level in the professional era (1996 to date) ===
For name changes of clubs, see under Singapore Premier League, "Clubs".

==== S.League Champions (1996–2017) ====
The S.League was founded in 1996.

Season	Champions	Runners-up
1996	Geylang United (1)	Singapore Armed Forces (1)
1997	Singapore Armed Forces (1)	Tiong Bahru United (1)
1998	Singapore Armed Forces (2)	Tanjong Pagar United (2)
1999	Home United (1)	Singapore Armed Forces (2)
2000	Singapore Armed Forces (3)	Tanjong Pagar United (3)
2001	Geylang United (2)	Singapore Armed Forces (3)
2002	Singapore Armed Forces (4)	Home United (1)
2003	Home United (2)	Geylang United (1)
2004	Tampines Rovers (1)	Home United (2)
2005	Tampines Rovers (2)	Singapore Armed Forces (4)
2006	Singapore Armed Forces (5)	Tampines Rovers (1)
2007	Singapore Armed Forces (6)	Home United (3)
2008	Singapore Armed Forces (7)	(South Korea) Super Reds (1)
2009	Singapore Armed Forces (8)	Tampines Rovers (2)
2010	(France) Étoile (1)	Tampines Rovers (3)
2011	Tampines Rovers (3)	Home United (4)
2012	Tampines Rovers (4)	(Brunei) DPMM (1)
2013	Tampines Rovers (5)	Home United (5)
2014	Warriors (9)	(Brunei) DPMM (2)
2015	(Brunei) DPMM (1)	Tampines Rovers (4)
2016	(Japan) Albirex Niigata (S) (1)	Tampines Rovers (5)
2017	(Japan) Albirex Niigata (S) (2)	Tampines Rovers (6)

==== Singapore Premier League Champions (2018–present) ====
In 2018, the S.League was rebranded as the Singapore Premier League.

Season	Champions	Runners-up
2018	(Japan) Albirex Niigata (S) (3)	Home United
2019	(Brunei) DPMM (2)	Tampines Rovers
2020	(Japan) Albirex Niigata (S) (4)	Tampines Rovers
2021	Lion City Sailors (3)	(Japan) Albirex Niigata (S)
2022	(Japan) Albirex Niigata (S) (5)	Lion City Sailors
2023	(Japan) Albirex Niigata (S) (6)	Lion City Sailors
2024–25	Lion City Sailors (4)	BG Tampines Rovers
2025–26	Lion City Sailors (5)	BG Tampines Rovers

Invited club

==== Performances by club ====
Clubs in bold compete in the current season. Italics indicates defunct club.

Singapore Premier League era (2018–present)

Club	Champions	Runners-up	Winning seasons	Runners-up seasons
**(Japan) Albirex Niigata (S)**	4	1	2018, 2020, 2022, 2023	2021
**Lion City Sailors**	3	3	2021, 2024–25, 2025–26	2018, 2022, 2023
(Brunei) DPMM	1	0	2019	
**BG Tampines Rovers**	0	4		2019, 2020, 2024–25, 2025–26

All professional era (1996–present)

Club	Champions	Runners-up	Winning seasons	Runners-up seasons
Warriors	9	4	1997, 1998, 2000, 2002, 2006, 2007, 2008, 2009, 2014	1996, 1999, 2001, 2005
**(Japan) Albirex Niigata (S)**	6	1	2016, 2017, 2018, 2020, 2022, 2023	2021
**Lion City Sailors**	5	8	1999, 2003, 2021, 2024–25, 2025–26	2002, 2004, 2007, 2011, 2013, 2018, 2022, 2023
**BG Tampines Rovers**	5	10	2004, 2005, 2011, 2012, 2013	2006, 2009, 2010, 2015, 2016, 2017, 2019, 2020, 2024–25, 2025–26
(Brunei) DPMM	2	2	2015, 2019	2012, 2014
**Geylang International**	2	1	1996, 2001	2003
(France) Étoile	1	0	2010	
**Tanjong Pagar United**	0	3		1997, 1998, 2000
(South Korea) Super Reds	0	1		2008

Invited club

=== Top level in the first restructurings and semi-professional era (1975 to 1995) ===
==== FAS Premier League Champions (1988–1995) ====
The FAS Premier League was founded in 1988 and took over the NFL as a top domestic league of Singapore. It was disbanded in 1996 with the establishment of the professional S.League.

Season	Champions	Runners up	Ref.
1988	Geylang International	Balestier United	
1989	Geylang International	Jurong Town FC	
1990	Geylang International	Jurong Town FC	
1991	Geylang International	Tiong Bahru CSC	
1992	Geylang International	Tiong Bahru CSC	
1993	Geylang International	Tiong Bahru CSC	
1994	(Australia) Perth Kangaroos	(Australia) Darwin Cubs	
1995	Geylang International	Tiong Bahru FC	(Note: Singapore Lions who finished top not eligible.)

Invited club

==== National Football League Division 1 (1975 to 1987) ====
The FAS formed the National Football League (NFL) in 1975, replacing the previous FAS League. The NFL had three divisions. The winner of the top division (Division 1) was the national champion, until the FAS Premier League was formed in 1988.

Season	Champions	Runners up	Ref.
1975	Geylang Internationals	SAFSA (Note: Singapore Armed Forces Sports Association, later Singapore Armed Forces FC, then renamed Warriors FC)	
1976	Geylang Internationals	Farrer Park United	
1977	Geylang Internationals	Toa Payoh United	
1978	SAFSA	Tampines Rovers	
1979	Tampines Rovers	Geylang Internationals	
1980	Tampines Rovers	SAFSA	
1981	SAFSA	Farrer Park United	
1982	Farrer Park United	Police SA	
1983	Tiong Bahru CSC	Toa Payoh United	
1984	Tampines Rovers	Farrer Park United	
1985	Police SA	Farrer Park United	
1986	SAFSA	Tiong Bahru CSC	
1987	Tiong Bahru CSC	Police SA	

=== SFA / SAFA / FAS League Division One prior to 1975 ===
Prior to the formation of the NFL in 1975, the FAS (including under its previous names, the Singapore Football Association (SFA), and the Singapore Amateur Football Association (SAFA) had organised a league competition in Singapore dating back to 1904. In 1948, the league changed from a largely communal "closed door" system to an "open door" policy.

==== Before "open door" policy (1904 to 1947) ====
Season	Singapore Football Champions	Singapore Football Runners-up
1904	Band & Drums (1st Battalion Manchester Regiment)	62nd Company RA
1905	E Company (Sherwood Foresters)	80th Company RGA
1906	Not played	
1907	Singapore Cricket Club	RGA
1908	2nd Battalion West Kentshire Regiment	
1909	3rd Battalion Middlesex Regiment	
1910	3rd Battalion Middlesex Regiment	
1911	Singapore Cricket Club	
1912	Singapore Cricket Club	
1913	Singapore Cricket Club	
1914	Singapore Cricket Club	
1915 to 1920	Not played due to World War I	
1921	1st Battalion South Staffordshire	Singapore Cricket Club
1922	2nd Battalion Middlesex Regiment	Singapore Cricket Club
1923	2nd Battalion Middlesex Regiment	Singapore Cricket Club
1924	Singapore Cricket Club	RGA
1925	Singapore Chinese Football Association	Singapore Cricket Club
1926	Duke of Wellington's	Singapore Chinese Football Association
1927	Duke of Wellington's	Singapore Chinese Football Association
1928	Duke of Wellington's	Singapore Malays Football Association
1929	Singapore Cricket Club	Singapore Malays Football Association
1930	Singapore Chinese Football Association	Singapore Malays Football Association
1931	Singapore Malays Football Association	Singapore Cricket Club
1932	Singapore Malays Football Association	Royal Air Force
1933	Singapore Malays Football Association	Singapore Chinese Football Association
1934	Singapore Chinese Football Association	Wiltshires
1935	Royal Engineers	Singapore Chinese Football Association
1937	Singapore Chinese Football Association	Inniskillings
1938	Singapore Chinese Football Association	Royal Artillery
1939	Malay FA	Royal Air Force
1940	Royal Air Force	Singapore Chinese Football Association
1941	Singapore Chinese Football Association	Royal Air Force
1942 to 1946	Not played due to World War II	
1947	Army	Malay FA

==== Under "open door" policy (1948 to 1974) ====
Season	Champions	Runners-up	Ref.
1948	Rovers SC	Tiger SA	
1949	Chinese Athletic	RAF Seletar	
1950	Kota Raja Club	RAF Seletar	
1951	Tiger SA	Rovers SC	
1952	Rovers SC	Tiger SA	
1953	Tiger SA	Rovers SC	
1954	Star Soccerites SC	Tiger SA	
1955	Marine Department SC	Tiger SA	
1956	Tiger SA	Amicable AA	
1957	Marine Department SC	Police SA	
1958	Darul Afiah	Chinese Athletic	
1959	Darul Afiah	Marine Department SC	
1960	Indian Recreation Club	RAF Seletar	
1961	Chinese Athletic	RAF Seletar	
1962	Tan Tock Seng Hospital		
1963	Darul Afiah FC	Marine Department	
1964	Darul Afiah FC		
1965	Darul Afiah FC	Blue Rovers	
1966	Darul Afiah FC	Blue Rovers	
1967	Darul Afiah FC	Police SA	
1968	Darul Afiah FC	Police SA	
1969	Darul Afiah FC	Fathul Karib	
1970	Toto Pools SC	Navy Wanderers	
1971	Guthrie Waugh		
1972	Armed Forces	Guthrie Waugh	
1973	Cancelled		
1974	Singapore Air Transport-workers Union	Armed Forces	

=== List of champions since the start of the "open door" policy (1949 to date) by number of titles won ===
Rank	Club	Winners	Winning seasons	Runners-up	Seasons
1	SAFSA / SAF FC / Warriors FC	13	1972, 1978, 1981, 1986, 1997, 1998, 2000, 2002, 2006, 2007, 2008, 2009, 2014	6	1975, 1980, 1996, 1999, 2001, 2005
2	Geylang International FC	12	1975, 1976, 1977, 1988, 1989, 1990, 1991, 1992, 1993, 1995, 1996, 2001	2	1979, 2003
3	Darul Afiah FC	9	1958, 1969, 1963, 1964, 1965, 1966, 1967, 1968, 1969	0	
4	Tampines Rovers FC	8	1979, 1980, 1984, 2004, 2005, 2011, 2012, 2013	11	1978, 2006, 2009, 2010, 2015, 2016, 2017, 2019, 2020, 2025–26, 2025-26
5	Police SA / Home United / Lion City Sailors FC	6	1985, 1999, 2003, 2021, 2024–25, 2025-26	13	1957, 1967, 1968, 1982, 1987, 2002, 2004, 2007, 2011, 2013, 2018, 2022, 2023
6	FC Jurong	6	2016, 2017, 2018, 2020, 2022, 2023	1	2021
7	Tiger SA	2	1951, 1953, 1956	4	1948, 1952, 1954, 1955
8	Tiong Bahru CSC / Tiong Bahru United / Tanjong Pagar United	2	1983, 1987	8	1986, 1991, 1992, 1993, 1997, 1998, 2000
8	Brunei DPMM	2	2015, 2019	2	2012, 2014
8	Marine Department	2	1955, 1957	2	1959, 1963
8	Rovers	2	1948, 1952	2	1951, 1953
12	Chinese Athletic	2	1949, 1961	1	1958
13	Farrer Park United	1	1982	4	1976, 1981, 1984, 1985
13	Guthrie Waugh	1	1971	1	1972
15	Etoile FC	1	2010	0	
15	Indian Recreation Club	1	1960	0	
15	Kota Rajah	1	1950	0	
15	Perth Kangaroos IFC	1	1994	0	
15	Singapore Air Transport-workers Union	1	1974	0	
15	Star Soccerites	1	1954	0	
15	Tan Tock Seng Hospital	1	1962	0	
15	Toto Pools SC	1	1970	0	
23	RAF Seletar	0		4	1949, 1950, 1960, 1961
24	Blue Rovers	0		2	1965, 1966
24	Fathul Karib / Balestier United (Balestier Khalsa)	0		2	1969, 1988
24	Jurong Town FC	0		2	1989, 1990
24	Toa Payoh United	0		2	1977, 1983
28	Amicable AA	0		1	1956
28	Darwin Cubs	0		1	1994
28	Navy Wanderers	0		1	1970
28	Super Reds	0		1	2008

=== Division 1 of the National Football League / Singapore Football League from 1988 onwards ===
With the formation of the FAS Premier League in 1988, the NFL Division One became the second tier of Singapore league football.

Season	Champions	Runners up	Ref.
As National Football League Division One
1988	Tyrwhitt Soccerites	Jubilee SA	
1989	Telok Kurau United	Gibraltar Crescent	
1990	Gibraltar Crescent	Ang Mo Kio CSC	
1991	Redhill Rangers	South Avenue SC	
1992	South Avenue SC	Jurong Town	
1993	Sembawang SC	South Avenue SC	
1994	Tampines Rovers	Changi United	
1995	Wellington		
1996 (Note: Single tier NFL with three groups of 7 teams each. The group winners were Tampines Rovers, Jurong Town FC and Marine Castle.)	Balestier United (Note: The amateur club that remained after the professional club, Balestier Central, was formed to compete in the inaugural S. League in 1996.)	Mountbatten	
1997	Mountbatten	Marine Castle United	
1998	Singapore Khalsa Association	Kaki Bukit SC	
1999	Sembawang SC (Note: The amateur club that remained after the professional club, Sembawang Rangers, was formed by the merger of the original club and Gibraltar Crescent to compete in the inaugural S. League in 1996.) (2)	Police SA (Note: The amateur club that remained after the professional club, Home United, was formed to compete in the inaugural S. League in 1996.)	
2000	Police SA		
2001	Andrews Avenue SC		
2002	Police SA (2)		
2003	Police SA (3)		
2004			
2005			
2006	Admiralty	Tessensohn Khalsa Rovers	
2007	Admiralty (2)	Katong	
2008	Sembawang SC (3)	SAFSA (Note: The amateur club that remained after the professional club was formed in 1996 as Singapore Armed Forces FC to participate in the S. League, before changing its name to Warriors FC in 2013.)	
2009	Singapore Cricket Club		
2010	Singapore Cricket Club (2)	Eunos Crescent	
2011	Singapore Recreation Club		
2012	Singapore Recreation Club (2)	Singapore Cricket Club	
2013	Police SA (4)	Singapore Recreation Club	
2014	Sporting Westlake	Police SA	
2015	Singapore Recreation Club (3)	Tiong Bahru (Note: The amateur club that remained after the professional club, Tiong Bahru United, was formed in 1996 to compete in the inaugural S. League.)	
2016	Eunos Crescent	Police SA	
2017	Yishun Sentek Mariners	SAFSA	
2018	Tiong Bahru	Balestier United	
2019	Tiong Bahru (2)	GFA Sporting Westlake	

Season	Champions	Runners up
As Singapore Football League 1
2020	Competition not held (Note: Amateur competitions were not held in Singapore in 2020 and 2021 due to the COVID-19 pandemic.)	
2021	Competition not held	
2022	Singapore Khalsa Association (2)	Yishun Sentek Mariners
2023	Singapore Khalsa Association (3)	Tiong Bahru
2024	Singapore Khalsa Association (4)	Singapore Cricket Club
2025	Singapore Cricket Club (3)	Jungfrau Punggol
2026–27		

=== Lower Divisions of the FAS League / National Football League / Singapore Football League (1921 to date) ===
The second, third and fourth levels of football leagues in Singapore have had various names over various periods.

==== Division 2 of the FAS Leagues / National Football League / Singapore Football League ====
- FAS Leagues Division 2 (1921 to 1974) - second tier of Football in Singapore (FAS was known as SFA from 1921 to 1929, SAFA from 1929 to 1966 and FAS from 1966 onwards).
- National Football League Division 2 (1975 to 1987) - second tier of Football in Singapore.
- National Football League Division 2 (1988 to 2017) - third tier of Singapore football league system.
- Singapore Football League 2 (2018 to date) - third tier of Singapore football league system.

===== SFA / SAFA League Division Two before "open door" policy (1921 to 1947) =====
Season	Champions	Runners-up
1921	St Joseph's Old Boys	1st Bn. South Staffordshire II
1926	Duke of Wellington's II	MFT
1927	Duke of Wellington's II (2A Champion), Royal Artillery II (2B Champions)	Police (2A Runners-up), Royal Engineers (2B Runners-up)
1929	Royal Engineers	Singapore Chinese FA "A"
1930	Police	GEC
1931	Singapore Cattle Transport Co.	Malaya Publishing House
1932	Singapore Chinese Football Association (Division 2)	Malays (Division Two)
1933	Malays (Division Two)	Marine Department
1934	Singapore Chinese Football Association(Division Two)	Wiltshires (Division Two)
1935	Police	Marine
1938	Royal Artillery (BM)	Skins II
1939	Post Office (Division 2A), SHB (Division 2B)	Royal Navy (Division 2A), SCFA 'B' (Division 2B)
1940	Pulau Brani (Division 2A), HM Customs (Division 2B)	Malaya Signals (Division 2A), YMCA (Division 2B)
1941	Royal Navy (Division 2A), HM Customs (Division 2B)	Royal Engineers (PB) (Division 2A), RAF Kallang (Division 2B)

===== SAFA / FAS League Division Two after "open door" policy (1948 to 1974) =====
Season	Champions	Runners-up	Score	Ref.
1948	Kota Raja	SHB Auxiliary Police	NA	(Note: League only)
1949	BOD Civilian Association	Hongkong & Shanghai Bank	1-1, 1-0	(Note: Playoff between group winners, with result of final)
1950	H.M. Dockyard	SHB Auxillary Police	2-1	
1951	Fathul Karib	RAF Tengah	NA	
1952	Marine Department	Star Soccerites	NA	
1953	Police	RN Dockyard	?	
1954	Singapore Corinthians	Woodbridge Hospital	NA	
1955	Argonauts	Harbour Board Police		
1956	Fathul Karib	Royal Engineering Civilian Association (RECA)		
1957	RAF Changi	Darul Afiah		
1958	Maxwell SC	Chinese Athletic 'A'		
1959	RAF Seletar	Sukaramai		
1960	Alexandra FT	RAF Changi		
1961	Tan Tock Seng Hospital	Daruh Afiah		
1962	Sukaramai	Alexandra SC		
1963	Amicable AA	Police SA	1-0	
1964	Blue Rovers	Star Soccerites	?	
1965	Telok Kurau United or Airport SC	Telok Kurau United or Airport SC	?	
1966	RAF Changi	Arsenal SC	NA	
1967	Stable Boys	Hamilton SC	2-0	
1968	Junior AA	Tampines Rovers	NA	
1969	Telok Kurau United	Kampong Kapor		
1970	Darul Afiah	Alexandra SC		
1971	Tampines Rovers	Tamil Brotherhood		
1972	Junior AA	SCC		
1973	Police SA	Port Authority		
1974	Stable Boys	Hampshire		

===== National Football League Division Two (1975 to 1987) =====
Level 2 of the Singapore football league system

Season	Champions	Runners up	Ref.
1975	Tampines Rovers	Ponggol Constituency	
1976	Changi United	Sembawang Constituency	
1977	Kaki Bukit / Chai Chee	Cairnhill CSC	
1978	Ponggol Constituency	Changi United	
1979	Tiong Bahru CSC	Mountbatten FC	
1980	Police SA	Jubilee SA	
1981	Sembawang CSC	Farrer Park Dynamos	
1982	Cairnhill FC	Toa Payoh United	
1983	Geylang Internationals	Jubilee SA	
1984	South Avenue	Changi United	
1985	Changi Constituency	Ayer Rajah Wanderers	
1986	Pioneer Arsenal	Kaki Bukit SC	
1987	Tyrwhitt Soccerites	Geylang Internationals	

===== National Football League / Singapore Football League Division Two (1988 to date) =====
With the formation of the FAS Premier League in 1988, the NFL Divison Two continued as the third tier of Singapore football.

Season	Champions	Runners up	Ref.
As National Football League Division Two
1988	South Avenue	Hai Sing Park Rangers	
1989	Ang Mo Kio CSC	Sembawang SC (Note: The amateur club that remained after the professional club, Sembawang Rangers, was formed by the merger of the original club and Gibraltar Crescent to compete in the inaugural S. League in 1996.)	
1990	Changi United	Redhill Rangers	
1991	Admiralty	Bukit Merah	
1992	Charlton	Pioneer Arsenal	
1993	Changi United (2)	Marine Castle	
1994	Wellington	Mountbatten	
1995			
1996	Competition not held (Note: Single tier NFL with three groups of 7 teams each. The group winners were Tampines Rovers, Jurong Town FC and Marine Castle.)		
1997	Redhill Rangers	Tessensohn Khalsa Rovers	
1998	Sembawang SC	Andrews Avenue SC	
1999	Singapore Cricket Club		
2000	Andrews Avenue SC		
2001			
2002	Katong		
2003			
2004			
2005			
2006	Eunos Crescent	Katong	
2007	West United	Kaki Bukit SC	
2008	Singapore Cricket Club (2)		
2009	Prison SRC		
2010	Borussia Zamrud	Kaki Bukit SC	
2011	Keppel Monaco	Tiong Bahru (Note: The amateur club that remained after the professional club, Tiong Bahru United, was formed in 1996 to compete in the inaugural S. League.)	
2012	Admiralty (2)	Sporting Westlake	
2013	Singapore Khalsa Association	Pioneer CSC	
2014	Yishun Sentek Mariners	Siglap CSC	
2015	Singapore Cricket Club (3)	Katong	
2016	Competition not held (Note: NFL was revamped into a single-division competition with 10 teams in 2016.)		
2017	Gymkhana Gaulois	South Avenue SC	
2018	Singapore Khalsa Association (2)	Warwick Knights	
2019	Project Vault Oxley	Siglap	

In 2020, the NFL was renamed as the SFL.

Season	Champions	Runners up
As Singapore Football League 2
2020	Competition not held (Note: Amateur competitions were not held in Singapore in 2020 and 2021 due to the COVID-19 pandemic.)	
2021	Competition not held	
2022	Jungfrau Punggol	Singapore Cricket Club
2023	Police SA (Note: The amateur club that remained after the professional club, Home United, was formed to compete in the inaugural S. League in 1996.)	South Avenue SC
2024	Tengah	Jungfrau Punggol
2025	Bishan Barx	South Avenue SC
2026–27		

==== Division 3 of the FAS Leagues / National Football League / Singapore Football League ====
- FAS Leagues Division 3 (1921 to 1974) - third tier of Football in Singapore (FAS was known as SAFA from 1929 to 1966 and FAS from 1966 onwards).
- National Football League Division 3 (1975 to 1987) - third tier of Football in Singapore.
- National Football League Division 3 (1988 to 2013) - fourth tier of Football in Singapore.

===== Up to 1947 =====
Before the commencement of the "open door" policy in 1948

Season	Champions	Runners-up
1932	Malaya Publishing House	Marine Department
1933	Singapore Chinese Football Association (Division 3)	Harbour Board
1934	Abbattoir (Division 3A), Monopolies (Division 3B)	Singapore Chinese Football Association (Division Three)(Division 3A), Fort Canning (Division 3B)
1935	Fort Canning	Wiltshire Regiment
1938	RAMC	Mental Services

===== SAFA / FAS League Division Three after "open door" policy (1948 to 1974) =====
Season	Champions	Runners-up	Score	Ref.
1948	Naval Stores	Mental Hospital RC	NA	(Note: League only)
1949	Paya Lebar Bus Co	Cosmos SC	2-0	(Note: Playoff between group winners, with result of final)
1950	Katong Sajarah	Cheerful Lads	2-1	
1951	Marine Department	RN Kranji	2-1	
1952	CYMA (PM)	Haikowyu	4-1	
1953	Singapore Corinthians	Balestier United	?	
1954	RAF Seletar	Young Men's Sikh Association	4-0	
1958	Rajaji (Division 3A), Darul Afiah "A" (Division 3B)	Mt Emily (Division 3A), Pachitan (Division 3B)		
1959	Jollilads	Stable Boys		
1962	Arsenal SC	Star Soccerites "A"		
1963	Kampong Kapor	Police "A"	1-0	
1964	?	?	?	
1966	Race Course United	RAF Changi "A"	1-0	
1967	Bakat Baru		NA	
1969	Vigilante Corps	Dunman Pioneers		
1970	Burnley United	Jollilads		
1971	AUPE	Hampshire SC		
1974	International Contract Specialists	Singapore Electronic & Engineering Limited		

===== NFL Division 3 (1975 to 1987) =====
Continuously between 1975 and 1987, as the third tier of Singapore football.

Season	Winners	Runners up	Ref.
1975	Cairnhill FC	Pasir Panjang CSC	
1976	Mountbatten FC	Bukit Panjang United	
1977	Serangoon Gardens RC	Balestier United	
1978	Tiong Bahru CSC	Farrer Park Dynamos	
1979	Jubilee SA	Police SA	
1980			
1981			
1982	Ponggol CSC	Balestier United	
1983			
1984	Mountbatten		
1985	Hai Sing Park Rangers	Gibraltar Crescent	
1986	Singapore Chinese		
1987			

===== NFL Division 3 (1988 to 2013) =====
Between 2001 and 2013 as an alternative to the Island Wide League at the fourth tier of Singapore football.

Season	Winners	Runners up
1999		
2000		
2001	Katong FC	
2002-2003	No records	
2004		
2005		
2006	Kaki Bukit	
2007	Tiong Bahru	
2008		
2009		
2010	Balestier United RC	
2011		
2012	Gambas Avenue SC	Summerville FC
2013	Starlight Soccerites	Tampines Vipers

==== Island Wide League Winners ====
After the FAS Premier League was formed in 1988, the National Football League Divisions One and Two made up the second and third levels of Singapore football, and the Island Wide League became the fourth level of the Singapore football league system. In several of the following seasons until 2013, the top teams from the Island Wide League were moved to the National Football League, as Division Three.

Season	Winner	Runners Up/ Losing Finalist	Score
1987	Ang Mo Kio CSC		
1989	Stamford West	Teban Spurs	
1991	Wellington FC		
1999	Singapore Recreation Club		
2002–2005	No records (Note: In 2002, several lower tier football clubs were found to be operating unlicensed gaming machines or gambling dens. Several such clubs were found to be fronts for such illicit activity, and were closed down. The closure of several clubs in that period affected Divisions Two and Three.)		
2007	Crescent Villa		
2010	Sporting Westlake	Dare To Dream FC	(league format)
2011	Siglap CSC	Newton Heath FC	(league format)
2012	Vipers FC	Warwick Knights FC	(league format)
2013	Yishun Sentek Mariners	Kembangan United	(league format)
2014	Kembangan United	Pioneer Ayer Rajah Soccerites	(league format)
2015	South Avenue		(league format)
2016	SAFSA	Balestier United RC (Note: The amateur club that remained after the professional club, Balestier Central, was formed to compete in the inaugural S. League in 1996.)	3-1
2017	Competition not held		
2018	Project Vault Oxley	Siglap FC	1-0
2019	Commonwealth Cosmos	Geylang Serai FC	1-0
2020	Competition not held (Note: Amateur competitions were not held in Singapore in 2020 and 2021 due to the COVID-19 pandemic.)		
2021	Competition not held		
2022	Xin Hua FC	Kaki Bukit SC	2-0
2023	Bedok South Avenue SC	Tengah FC	2-1
2024	GDT Circuit FC	Westwood El'Junior	2-1
2025	Gymkhana FC	Tanah Merah United	3-2
2026	Tiong Bahru	Jurong FC	3-0

=== Winners of reserve leagues ===
==== Singapore Premier League 2 winners ====
Singapore Premier League 2 is the league for Singapore Premier League clubs' reserves.

Season	Champions	Runners-up
2025-26	Albirex Niigata (S) II	Young Lions B
2026-27		

==== Singapore's Prime League Winners (1997 to 2017) ====
The Singapore Prime League was a league for reserve and youth players held from 1997 to 2017. It was superseded by the Singapore Premier League 2.

Season	Champions	Runners-up
1997	Singapore Armed Forces Reserves	Balestier Khalsa Reserves
1998	Geylang United Reserves	Home United Reserves
1999	Singapore Armed Forces Reserves	Home United Reserves
2000	Singapore Armed Forces Reserves	Home United Reserves
2001	Home United Reserves	Singapore Armed Forces Reserves
2002	Home United Reserves	Singapore Armed Forces Reserves
2003	Home United Reserves	(China) Sinchi Reserves
2004	Home United Reserves	Singapore Armed Forces Reserves
2005	(China) Sinchi Reserves	Geylang United Reserves
2006	Geylang United Reserves	Singapore Armed Forces Reserves
2007	Singapore Armed Forces Reserves	Tampines Rovers Reserves
2008	Singapore NFA U-18	Gombak United Reserves
2009	Home United Reserves	Tampines Rovers Reserves
2010	Singapore NFA U-18	Home United Reserves
2011	Geylang United Reserves	Gombak United Reserves
2012	Balestier Khalsa Reserves	Singapore NFA U-18
2013	Balestier Khalsa Reserves	Home United Reserves
2014	Home United Reserves	Geylang International Reserves
2015	Tampines Rovers Reserves	Singapore NFA U-18
2016	Home United Reserves	Warriors Reserves
2017	Home United Reserves	Hougang United Reserves

== Expatriate leagues ==
=== Cosmopolitan League ===
The Cosmopolitan League, or the Cosmoleague was founded in 1975 by a soccer section member of the Singapore Cricket Club. It is currently the top leading amateur football league in Singapore and is a league cater for both local and expatriate players who are not involved in the national leagues and residing in Singapore. There have been many well known retired or semi-retired professional footballers who have come to participate in this league over the years. Some of the most well known clubs participating in the Cosmoleague are Singapore Cricket Club, Singapore FC, Casuals FC Singapore and 1 Tanah Merah FC.

=== Equatorial Football League ===
Equatorial Football League is a multi-national football league founded in 2006. The league was previously sanctioned by Football Association of Singapore and consists of mainly expatriate football clubs with expatriate players. Well-known amateur football clubs such as Singapore Cricket Club, Singapore FC and Purple Monkeys FC have also participate in this league. The league consists of 4 divisions, the Saturday Qualification, Saturday Premiership, Sunday Qualification and Sunday Premiership divisions.

=== Past winners ===
Season	Cosmoleague Winners	Cosmoleague Runners-up	EFL Saturday Premiership Winners	EFL Saturday Premiership Runners-up	EFL Saturday Qualification Winners	EFL Saturday Qualification Runners-up	EFL Sunday Premiership Winners	EFL Sunday Premiership Runners-up	EFL Sunday Qualification Winners	EFL Sunday Qualification Runners-up
1974/1975	SCC First									
1982/1983	SCC First									
1986/1987	Hotspurs FC									
1987/1988	Hotspurs FC									
1988/1989	Casuals FC	Hotspurs FC								
1989/1990	Swiss FC	Hotspurs FC								
1990/1991	Swiss FC	Hotspurs FC								
1991/1992	Hotspurs FC									
1992/1993	Hotspurs FC									
1993/1994	Hotspurs FC									
1994/1995	Swiss FC	Casuals FC								
1995/1996	Hotspurs FC	Swiss FC								
1996/1997	Casuals FC	Hotspurs FC								
1997/1998	Gaelic Lions FC	Swiss FC								
1998/1999	Casuals FC	Swiss FC								
1999/2000	FC Nippon	Casuals FC								
2000/2001	Hotspurs FC	Gaelic Lions FC								
2001/2002	SCC First									
2002/2003	Casuals FC	SCC First								
2003/2004	SCC First	Latini FC								
2004/2005	Brewerkz FC	SCC First								
2005/2006	Casuals FC	SCC First								
2006/2007	Casuals FC	SCC First								
2007/2008	Casuals FC	SCC First								
2008/2009	SCC First	Casuals FC								
2009/2010	SCC First	Casuals FC								
2010/2011	SCC First	Casuals FC								
2011/2012	SCC First	Casuals FC								
2012/2013	SCC First	Casuals FC								
2013/2014	SCC First	FC Nippon								
2014/2015	SCC First	Casuals FC								
2015/2016	TGA Rangers FC	SCC First	Purple Monkeys FC							
2016/2017	SCC First	TGA Rangers FC	British Club XI	Rampant Casuals FC			Team BI			
2017/2018	SCC First	Gaelic Lions FC	CBD Wanderers							

== Women's national leagues ==
=== Women's Premier League ===
Season	Champions	Runners-up	Ref.
1974	Spiders FC		
1975	Unknown		
1976	Unknown		
1977–78	Darul Afiah FC		
1979–80	Unknown		
1982–85	No Championship		
1986	Darul Afiah FC		
1987	Club 86		
2000	Tampines Rovers	Singapore American School	
2001	Tampines Rovers (2)	Home United	
2002	Tampines Rovers (3)	Home United	
2003	Tampines Rovers (4)	Home United	
2004	Guangzhou Sunray Cave	Home United	
2005	Paya Lebar Punggol	Bishan Arsenal	
2006	Young Women (Note: National Under-23 players)	Paya Lebar Punggol	
2007	Bishan Arsenal	Young Women	.
2008	Young Women (2)	Arion (Note: Currently known as Still Aerion)	
2009	Sengkang Punggol (Note: Sengkang Punggol was a merger between Paya Lebar-Punggol and Sengkang Marine. Currently known as Hougang United) (2)	Middle Rangers	
2010	Ang Mo Kio United (Note: Formerly known as Bishan Arsenal) (2)	Middle Rangers	
2011	Borussia Zamrud	Police SA	
2012	Tanjong Pagar United	Middle Rangers	
2013	Middle Rangers	Young Women	
2014	Eunos Crescent	Police SA	
2015	GFA Sporting Westlake	Police SA	
2016	Warriors	Arion FA	
2017	Warriors (2)	Woodlands Wellington	
2018	Warriors (3)	Woodlands Wellington	
2019	Warriors (4)	Home United	
2020	Competition not held due to Covid-19 Pandemic		
2021	Competition not held due to Covid-19 Pandemic		
2022	Lion City Sailors (Note: Formerly known as Home United)	Albirex Niigata (S)	
2023	Lion City Sailors (2)	Albirex Niigata (S)	
2024	Lion City Sailors (3)	Albirex Niigata (S)	
2025	Albirex Niigata (S) (Note: Currently known as Albirex Jurong)	Still Aerion	

=== Women's National League ===
Season	Winners	Runners-up
2018	Tampines Changkat CSC	Simei United FC

=== Women's Youth League ===
Season	Winners	Runners-up
2017	Warriors FC	GDT Circuit FC

=== Women's Challenge Cup ===
Season	Winners	Runners-up
2016	Warriors FC	Woodlands Wellington FC
2017	Warriors FC	Police Sports Association Singapore
2018	Warriors FC	Tanjong Pagar United FC

== National Cups' Winners ==
=== Singapore Cup Winners ===
The Singapore League Cup commenced in 1997 as a cup competition for S. League clubs in addition to the Singapore FA Cup. In 1998, the Singapore League Cup was renamed the Singapore Cup, and S. League clubs ceased participating in the Singapore FA Cup. The Singapore Cup remains a cup competition for the top flight only (rebranded as the Singapore Premier League in 2018).

Year	Winners	Runners-up	Score in Final	3rd place	4th place
1997	Singapore Armed Forces	Geylang United	1-0	Tampines Rovers; Tiong Bahru United	No 3rd-place play-off
1998	Tanjong Pagar United	Singapore Armed Forces	2–0	Home United	Sembawang Rangers
1999	Singapore Armed Forces	Jurong FC	3–1	Home United	Balestier Central
2000	Home United	Singapore Armed Forces	1–0	Geylang United	Woodlands Wellington
2001	Home United	Geylang United	8–0	Singapore Armed Forces	Tanjong Pagar United
2002	Tampines Rovers	Jurong FC	1–0	Geylang United	Sengkang Marine
2003	Home United	Geylang United	2–1	Jurong FC; Woodlands Wellington	No 3rd-place playoff
2004	Tampines Rovers	Home United	4–1 (aet)	Geylang United (China) Sinchi FC	No 3rd-place playoff
2005	Home United	Woodlands Wellington	3–2	Singapore Armed Forces; Tampines Rovers	No 3rd-place playoff
2006	Tampines Rovers	(Thailand) Chonburi	3–2 (aet)	Woodlands Wellington	Balestier Khalsa
2007	Singapore Armed Forces	Tampines Rovers	4–3	(Thailand) Bangkok University	Woodlands Wellington
2008	Singapore Armed Forces	Woodlands Wellington	2–1 (aet)	Tampines Rovers	(Singapore) Young Lions
2009	Geylang United	(Thailand) Bangkok Glass	1–0	(Thailand) TTM Samut Sakhon	(Japan) Albirex Niigata (S)
2010	(Thailand) Bangkok Glass	Tampines Rovers	1–0	(France) Étoile FC	(Singapore) Young Lions
2011	Home United	(Japan) Albirex Niigata (S)	1–0 (aet)	(France) Étoile FC	Hougang United
2012	Singapore Armed Forces	Tampines Rovers	2–1	Gombak United	(Philippines) Loyola Meralco Sparks
2013	Home United	Tanjong Pagar United	4–1	Balestier Khalsa	(Philippines) Global FC
2014	Balestier Khalsa	Home United	3–1	Tampines Rovers	(Brunei) DPMM FC
2015	(Japan) Albirex Niigata (S)	Home United	2–1	(Brunei) DPMM FC	(Philippines) Global FC
2016	(Japan) Albirex Niigata (S)	Tampines Rovers	2–0	(Philippines) Ceres-La Salle	Balestier Khalsa
2017	(Japan) Albirex Niigata (S)	(Philippines) Global Cebu	2–2; 3-1 (pen)	Home United	Hougang United

Key
Invitational club

=== Singapore FA Cup winners ===
The Singapore FA Cup, formed as the Amateur Football Association Challenge Cup (1892-1967), became the FAS President Cup (1968-1993), and is now referred to as the Singapore FA Cup Winners (1994–Present).

==== Up to 1947 ====
Before the introduction of the "open door" policy in 1948

Year	Champions	Runners-up	Score in final	Date	Venue
1892	Singapore Engineers	Royal Artillery	6-2		
1893	Royal Engineers	Singapore Cricket Club	1-0		
1894	10th Lincolnshire Regiment 1st and 10th Lincolnshire Regiment 2nd (Title Shared)				
1895	Royal Artillery	5th North Humberland Fusiliers	3-1		
1896	5th North Humberland Fusiliers	Singapore Cricket Club	2-0		
1897	1st Battalion The Rifle Brigade	Corporals of The Rifle Brigade	4-0		
1898	12th Company Royal Artillery	West Yorkshire Regiment	3-2		
1899	1st BKOR Lancaster Regiment	Tanjong Pagar FC	1-0		
1900	12th Company Royal Artillery	35th Company Royal Artillery	1-0		
1901	Singapore Cricket Club	12th Company Royal Artillery	3-1		
1902	49th Company Royal Artillery	50th Company Royal Artillery	1-0		
1903	Singapore Cricket Club	Fort Canning Recreation Club	2-0		
1904	Harlequins	Manchester Regiment	1-0		
1905	1st Battery Sherwood Foresters	Singapore Cricket Club	1-0		
1906	1st Battery Sherwood Foresters	Singapore Cricket Club	1-0		
1907	2nd Battery West Kent Regiment B	2nd Battery West Kent Regiment A	1-0		
1908	2nd Battery West Kent Regiment B	Royal Garrison Artillery	2-0		
1909	3rd Battalion Middlesex Regiment	Royal Garrison Artillery	2-0		
1910	3rd Battalion Middlesex Regiment	3rd Battalion Middlesex Regiment II	2-0		
1911	The Buffs (East Kent Regiment)	Wanderers	1-0		
1912	The Buffs (East Kent Regiment)	Singapore Cricket Club	2-1		
1913	1st Battalion KOYLI	Singapore Cricket Club	2-1		
1914	1st Battalion KOYLI	Singapore Cricket Club	1-0		
1915-1916	Not played due to World War I				
1917	1/4th Battalion KSLI	Singapore Recreation Club	1-0		
1918-1919	Not played	N/A			
1920	1st Battalion South Staffordshire	Singapore Recreation Club	1-0		
1921	Singapore Cricket Club	Royal Engineers	2-1		
1922	2nd Battalion Middlesex Regiment	Singapore Cricket Club	1-0		
1923	2nd Battalion Middlesex Regiment	St Joseph's Old Boys	3-0		
1924	HMS "Pegasus" Football Team	Singapore Cricket Club	2-1		
1925	Singapore Chinese FA	Royal Sussex	4-2		
1926	2nd Bttl. Duke of Wellington's R.	Singapore Chinese FA	2-1		
1927	2nd Bttl. Duke of Wellington's R.	Singapore Chinese FA	6-1		
1928	2nd Bttl. Duke of Wellington's R.	Singapore Chinese FA	4-1		
1929	Singapore Cricket Club	Singapore Chinese FA	1-0		
1930	Malay FA	Welch Regiment	1-0		
1931	Malay FA	Gloucester Regiment	4-3		
1932	Malay FA	Royal Air Force	1-0		
1933	Wiltshire Regiment	Malay FA	5-3		
1934	Malay FA	Marine Department	6-2		
1935	Singapore Chinese FA	Malay FA	3-1		
1936	Royal Artillery	Police FC	2-0		
1937	Singapore Chinese FA 1st	Singapore Chinese FA 2nd	3-1		
1938	Royal Artillery	Royal Air Force	3-2		
1939	Singapore Chinese FA	The Loyal Regiment	2-1		
1940	The Loyal Regiment	Royal Air Force (Seletar)	1-0		
1941	Royal Air Force (Seletar)	The Loyal Regiment	2-0		
1942-1946	Not played due to World War I				
1947	Malay FA	Singapore Chinese FA	2-0		

==== 1948 to 1967 ====
The "open door" was introduced in 1948. The competition was played every year until 1964. It does not appear to have been played between 1965 and 1967.

Year	Champions	Runners-up	Score in final	Date	Venue	Ref.
1948	Kota Raja SC	Singapore Recreation Club	3-0	23 Oct 1948		
1949	Kota Raja SC	Base Ordnance Depot Civilians	3-0	26 Nov 1949	Jalan Besar Stadium	
1950	Royal Navy	Rovers SC	2-1	7 Oct 1950		
1951	Royal Navy	Kota Raja SC	1-0	30 Sep 1951	Jalan Besar Stadium	
1952	Tiger SA	Royal Air Force (Seletar)	3-0	27 Sep 1952	Jalan Besar Stadium	
1953	Tiger SA	Fathul Karib FC	2-1	27 Nov 1953	Jalan Besar Stadium	
1954	Rovers SC	Royal Navy	2-2, 3-0	5 & 12 Nov 1954	Jalan Besar Stadium	
1955	Marine Department SC	Argonauts	3-0			
1956	Tiger SA	Marine Department SC	3-2			
1957	Amicable AA	Indian Recreation Club	5-4			
1958	Fathul Karib FC	Amicable AA	3-1			
1959	Darul Afiah FC	Fathul Karib FC	3-2			
1960	Royal Air Force (Seletar)	Fathul Karib FC	4-1			
1961	Chinese Athletic	Royal Air Force (Seletar)	5-2			
1962	Marine Department SC	Tan Tock Seng Hospital	3-2			
1963	Tan Tock Seng Hospital	Junior AA	7-1	26 Dec 1963	Jalan Besar Stadium	
1964	Darul Afiah FC	Chinese Athletic	3-1	6 Dec 1964	Jalan Besar Stadium	
1965-67	not played					

==== 1967 to 1998 ====
Called the President's Cup from 1968 to 1993. From 1996 to 1998, the competition was limited to top flight S. League clubs.

Year	Champions	Runners-up	Score	Date	Venue	Ref.
1968	Police SA	Fathul Karib	3-2	11 Jan 1969	Jalan Besar Stadium	
1969	Royal Navy Wanderers	Police SA	4-2 [aet]			
1970	Armed Forces	Police SA	2-1			
1971-72	not played					
1973	cancelled					
1974	International Contract Specialists	Armed Forces	1-1 (4-3 pen)			
1975	SAFSA	Tampines Rovers	1-0	19 Dec 1975	National Stadium	
1976	Geylang Internationals	Farrer Park United	2-1	12 Dec 1976	National Stadium	
1977	Toa Payoh United	Geylang International	3-2 [aet]	11 Dec 1976	National Stadium	
1978	Geylang Internationals	Tampines Rovers	4-1	11 Nov 1978	National Stadium	
1979	Toa Payoh United	Tampines Rovers	1-0			
1980	Police SA	Farrer Park United	5-1			
1981	Farrer Park United	Changi CSC	1-0			
1982	Tiong Bahru CSC	Farrer Park Dynamos	3-2			
1983	Farrer Park United	SAFSA	3-0			
1984	SAFSA	Farrer Park Dynamos	1-0			
1985	Tiong Bahru CSC	Geylang Internationals	3-0			
1986	SAFSA	Police SA	3-1			
1987	Tiong Bahru CSC	Police SA	2-0			
1987/88	Jurong Town	SAFSA	3-2			
1988/89	Jurong Town	Police SA	2-1			
1990	Geylang International	SAFSA	2-0			
1991	Geylang International	SAFSA	3-0			
1992	Balestier United	Geylang International	3-2			
1993	not played					
1994	Tiong Bahru CSC	Geylang International	4-2		National Stadium	
1995	Geylang United	Wellington FC	2-1		National Stadium	
1996	Geylang United	Singapore Armed Forces	1-1 (4-2 penalties)		National Stadium	
1997	Singapore Armed Forces FC	Woodlands Wellington FC	4-2		National Stadium	
1998	Tanjong Pagar United	Sembawang Rangers	1-0		National Stadium	

==== 1999 to date ====
Since 1999, the Singapore FA Cup has been for only NFL and IWL clubs, and top flight clubs (S. League, renamed SPL in 2018) have not partictipated, although their reserve teams took part at various times from 2006 until 2017.

Year	Champions	Runners-up	Score in final	Date	Venue
1999	Police SA (Note: The amateur club that remained after the professional club, Home United, was formed as a professional club to compete in the inaugural S. League in 1996.)	Mountbatten FC	3-0	22 August 1999	Tampines Stadium
2000	Sembawang SC (Note: The amateur club that remained after the professional club, Sembawang Rangers, was formed by the merger of the original club and Gibraltar Crescent to compete in the inaugural S. League in 1996.)	Andrews Avenue SC	3-2	20 August 2000	Tampines Stadium
2001	Andrews Avenue SC	Tessensohn Khalsa Rovers	5-0	18 October 2001	Choa Chu Kang Stadium
2002	Police SA	Singapore Cricket Club	2-1	25 August 2002	Clementi Stadium
2003	Tampines Rovers SC (Note: The amateur club that remained after the professional club was formed in 1996, also as Tampines Rovers to participate in the S. League)	Police SA	3-1	24 August 2003	Jalan Besar Stadium
2004	Tampines Rovers SC	Katong FC	7-0	9 October 2004	Jalan Besar Stadium
2005	SAFSA (Note: The amateur club that remained after the professional club was formed in 1996 as Singapore Armed Forces FC to participate in the S. League, before changing its name to Warriors FC in 2013.)	Tessensohn Khalsa Rovers	5-0	3 September 2005	Jalan Besar Stadium
2006	Singapore Armed Forces Prime League team	Singapore Cricket Club	2-1	11 October 2006	Jalan Besar Stadium
2007	Geylang United Prime League team	NFA U-18	1-0	27 September 2007	Jalan Besar Stadium
2008	Singapore Armed Forces Prime League team	Katong FC	1-0	30 October 2008	Jalan Besar Stadium
2009	Singapore Cricket Club	Balestier Khalsa Prime League team	3-2	20 October 2009	Jalan Besar Stadium
2010	Singapore Recreation Club	Tampines Rovers Prime League team	3-2	19 October 2010	Jalan Besar Stadium
2011	Tampines Rovers Prime League team	Singapore Recreation Club	1-1 (8-7 p)	27 October 2012	Jalan Besar Stadium
2012	Balestier Khalsa Prime League team	Siglap CSC	2-0	30 October 2012	Jalan Besar Stadium
2013	Home United Prime League team	GFA Sporting Westlake	4-1	8 November 2013	Jalan Besar Stadium
2014	Singapore Recreation Club	Balestier Khalsa Prime League team	1-1 (5-3 p)	8 November 2014	Jalan Besar Stadium
2015	Home United Prime League team	Police SA	5-1	29 November 2015	Serangoon Stadium
2016	Home United Prime League team	Siglap FC	3-1	20 November 2016	Jalan Besar Stadium
2017	Warriors FC Prime League team	Yishun Sentek Mariners	2-1	29 October 2017	Jalan Besar Stadium
2018	Yishun Sentek Mariners	Tiong Bahru FC	3-1	18 November 2018	Jalan Besar Stadium
2019	Tiong Bahru FC	Yishun Sentek Mariners	2-1	20 October 2019	Jalan Besar Stadium
Competition not held from 2020 to 2022
2023	Yishun Sentek Mariners	Singapore Khalsa Association	3-2	19 November 2023	Jalan Besar Stadium
Competition not held in 2024
2025	Warwick Knights	Police SA	2-1	9 November 2025	Bedok Stadium
2026					

=== Singapore League Cup Winners ===
Year	Winners	Runners-up	Score in Final	3rd place	4th place
1997	Singapore Armed Forces	Geylang United	1-0	Tampines Rovers; Tiong Bahru United	No 3rd-place play-off
2007	Woodlands Wellington	Sengkang Punggol	4-0	Gombak United	Home United
2008	Gombak United	(South Korea) Super Reds	2-1	Balestier Khalsa	(Singapore) Young Lions
2009	(Brunei) DPMM FC	Singapore Armed Forces	1-1 (aet); 4-3 (pen)	Home United	Woodlands Wellington
2010	(France) Étoile FC	Woodlands Wellington	3-1	Sengkang Punggol	Gombak United
2011	(Japan) Albirex Niigata (S)	Hougang United	0-0 (aet); 5-4 (pen)	Tampines Rovers	Home United
2012	(Brunei) DPMM FC	Geylang United	2-0	Singapore Armed Forces; Tampines Rovers	No 3rd-place play-off
2013	Balestier Khalsa	(Brunei) DPMM FC	4-0	(Japan) Albirex Niigata (S); Woodlands Wellington	No 3rd-place play-off
2014	(Brunei) DPMM FC	Tanjong Pagar United	2-0	Hougang United; Geylang International	No 3rd-place play-off
2015	(Japan) Albirex Niigata (S)	Balestier Khalsa	2-1	Hougang United; Geylang International	No 3rd-place play-off
2016	(Japan) Albirex Niigata (S)	(Brunei) DPMM FC	2-0	Home United; Tampines Rovers	No 3rd-place play-off
2017	(Japan) Albirex Niigata (S)	Warriors FC	1-0	(Brunei) DPMM FC; Geylang International	No 3rd-place play-off

Note:
Tampines Rovers SC is a separate entity from Tampines Rovers.
SAFSA is a separate entity from Singapore Armed Forces.
Police SA is a separate entity from Home United (formerly Police FC).

=== Singapore Plate Winners ===
From 2012, a Plate Tournament was launched for the four teams that finished third in their respective Singapore League Cup groups. The Singapore League Cup was discontinued after 2017.

Year	Winners	Runners-up	Score in Final
2012	Balestier Khalsa	(Singapore) Young Lions	1-0
2013	(Malaysia) Harimau Muda B	(Singapore) Young Lions	2-0
2014	Tampines Rovers	Balestier Khalsa	3-0
2015	Not Held		
2016	Geylang International	Hougang United	2-1
2017	Not Held		

== Curtain raiser ==
=== Singapore Community Shield Winners ===
Main article: Singapore Community Shield

==== Results ====
Year	Champions	Score	Runners-up	Note	Venue
2008	SAFFC	1–1 (a.e.t.) (5–4 pen.)	Home United		Jalan Besar Stadium
2009	S.League Foreign Players	2–0	S.League Local Players		Jalan Besar Stadium
2010	Singapore Armed Forces, AIK (Sweden)	1–1	—N/a	Title was shared	Jalan Besar Stadium
2011	Tampines Rovers	2–1	Étoile		Jalan Besar Stadium
2012	Tampines Rovers	2–0	Home United		Jalan Besar Stadium
2013	Tampines Rovers	2–1	Warriors FC		Jalan Besar Stadium
2014	Tampines Rovers	1–0	Home United		Jalan Besar Stadium
2015	Warriors FC	1–0	Balestier Khalsa		Jalan Besar Stadium
2016	Albirex Niigata (S)	3–2	DPMM (Brunei)		Jalan Besar Stadium
2017	Albirex Niigata (S)	2–1	Tampines Rovers		Jalan Besar Stadium
2018	Albirex Niigata (S)	2–1	Tampines Rovers		National Stadium
2019	Home United	0-0 (a.e.t.) (5-4 pen.)	Albirex Niigata (S)		Jalan Besar Stadium
2020	Tampines Rovers	3–0	Hougang United		Jalan Besar Stadium
2021	Competition cancelled due to COVID-19 pandemic in Singapore.				
2022	Lion City Sailors	2–1	Albirex Niigata (S)		Jalan Besar Stadium
2023	Albirex Niigata (S)	3–0	Hougang United		Jalan Besar Stadium
2024	Lion City Sailors	2–0	Albirex Niigata (S)		Jalan Besar Stadium
2025	Tampines Rovers	4–1	Lion City Sailors		Jurong East Stadium
2026	Lion City Sailors	2–0	Tampines Rovers		Jalan Besar Stadium

==== Performance by clubs ====
Club	Winners	Runners-up	Winning years
Tampines Rovers	6	3	2011, 2012, 2013, 2014, 2020, 2025
Lion City Sailors	4	4	2019, 2022, 2024, 2026
FC Jurong	4	3	2016, 2017, 2018, 2023
Warriors	3	1	2008, 2010 (shared), 2015
AIK (Sweden)	1	0	2010 (shared)
S.League Foreign Players	1	0	2009
Hougang United	0	2	
S.League Local Players	0	1	
Étoile	0	1	
Balestier Khalsa	0	1	
DPMM (Brunei)	0	1	

=== Singapore Football League Challenge Cup Winners ===
The SFL Challenge Cup is the curtain raiser to the SFL season, between the Division One champions and the Singapore FA Cup winners.

Year	Champions	Runners-up	Score in final	Date	Venue
2018	Yishun Sentek Mariners FC	Singapore Armed Forces Sports Association (SAFSA)	5-3	29 April 2018	Jalan Besar Stadium
2019	Yishun Sentek Mariners FC	Tiong Bahru FC	3-2	17 March 2019	
2023	Singapore Khalsa Association FC	Yishun Sentek Mariners FC	2-1	29 April 2023	
2024	Singapore Khalsa Association	Yishun Sentek Mariners FC	1-0	21 July 2024	Jalan Besar Stadium
2025	Singapore Cricket Club	Singapore Khalsa Association	1-0	13 April 2025	Jalan Besar Stadium

== See also ==
- FAS Premier League
- Singapore Premier League
- Singapore FA Cup
- Singapore League Cup
- Prime League
- List of football clubs in Singapore
- Singapore National Football League
- Singapore football league system
