= List of football clubs in Singapore =

This is a list of current and former football clubs in Singapore.

Football clubs in Singapore are by and large unincorporated associations or registered societies under Singapore's Societies Act 1966, rather than incorporated entites. Lion City Sailors is currently the only club in the top flight that is incorporated.

The non-registration of clubs first became an issue in 1962. Many clubs that had existed and played in leagues for many or several years only registered under the Societies Act in the 1970s or 1980s due to a stricter regulatory environment in Singapore, that arose with:

- Greater control over political and religious groups.
- The introduction of the Societies (Amendment) Act 1982.

In 1973, 11 clubs were rejected by the Football Association of Singapore (FAS) from the FAS League for not being registered with the Registry of Societies.

When the FAS formed the National Football League (NFL) in 1975, it required clubs to be constituency or district based. Several clubs changed their name to meet this requirement. Several constituency based clubs that had been participating in inter-constituency competitions through the People's Association were admitted into the NFL. The clubs bore the suffix "Constituency". "CSC" was a common abbreviation for "Constituency Sports Club", as in Tiong Bahru CSC.

Prior to 1975, "Sports Club" (SC) and "Sports Association" (SA) were common suffixes for private and social clubs that fielded football teams, more so than "Football Club" (FC). Later, as clubs became more specialised in football, "Football Club" became more popular, and several clubs changed from SC or SA to FC. A second part of the name, especially "United" was also popular, mirroring the appeal of English clubs in Singapore. Several clubs later dropped "Constituency" from their name, especially when ties to the People's Association were reduced or ended.

Until a club was formally registered under the Societies Act, it could change its name from year to year, sometimes by a minor change in the spelling of the constituency or district to reflect contemporaneous use, other times, by changing its suffix.

In line with Asian Football Confederation’s (AFC) Club Licensing Regulations, the Football Association of Singapore Club Licensing Scheme (CLS) was introduced for the first time in 2013.

== Current Singapore Premier League (SPL) clubs ==
For name changes, see under Singapore Premier League, "Clubs". See also "Splinter clubs" section below.

- Balestier Khalsa
- FC Jurong
- Geylang International
- Hougang United
- Lion City Sailors
- Tampines Rovers
- Tanjong Pagar United
- Young Lions (Developmental team)

== Top flight clubs (1975 onwards) ==
Clubs that played in the top flight in Singapore (National Football League Division One from 1975 to 1987, FAS Premier League from 1988 to 1995 and S. League / SPL from 1996 onwards).

Note:
See "Splinter clubs" below for more details.

=== Former Singapore Premier League clubs ===
Clubs that played in the Singapore Premier League (2018 to date).

- DPMM FC (move to Malaysia Super League)

=== Former S.League clubs ===
Clubs that played in the S. League (1996 to 2017).

Local clubs:

- Gombak United (Withdrew due to financial reason)
- Jurong FC (Withdrew due to financial reason)
- Sembawang Rangers (Withdrew due to financial reason)
- Warriors FC (Withdrew due to financial reason)
- Balestier Central (Merged with Clementi Khalsa to form Balestier Khalsa)
- Clementi Khalsa (Merged with Balestier Central to form Balestier Khalsa)
- Paya Lebar Punggol (Merged with Sengkang Marine to form Sengkang Punggol)
- Sengkang Marine (Merged with Paya Lebar Punggol to form Sengkang Punggol)
- Sengkang Punggol (Now Hougang United)
- Woodlands Wellington (merged with Hougang United)

Satellite or foreign clubs:

- Beijing Guoan Talent (Chinese satellite club)
- Dalian Shide (Chinese satellite club)
- Liaoning Guangyuan (Chinese satellite club)
- Sinchi FC (Chinese disapora club)
- Harimau Muda A (Malaysian national team U22)
- Harimau Muda B (Malaysian national team U21)
- Super Reds (Korean diaspora club)
- Sporting Afrique (Foreign team made up of players from Africa)

=== Clubs that played in the FAS Premier League (1988–1995) ===
Clubs that played in the FAS Premier League:

- Balestier United RC (now known as Balestier Khalsa)
- Darwin Cubs (foreign team from Australia)
- Geylang International FC
- Gibraltar Crescent
- Jurong Town FC (not to be confused with FC Jurong)
- Perth Kangaroos IFC (foreign team from Australia)
- Police Sports Association (later Home United, now Lion City Sailors, while the current Police SA currently plays in NFL Division 1)
- Redhill Rangers
- Singapore Armed Forces Sports Association (later Singapore Armed Forces FC and Warriors FC)
- Singapore Lions (played in the Premier League for one year in 1995, following Singapore's withdrawal from the Malaysia League)
- Tampines Rovers FC
- Tiong Bahru Constituency / FC (now known as Tanjong Pagar United)
- Tyrwhitt Soccerites

=== Clubs that played in the National Football League Division One (1975–1987) ===
Singapore's top flight, from the formation of the National Football League in 1975 until the formation of the FAS Premier League in 1988. Years in brackets indicate period in Division One.

- Ayer Rajah Wanderers (1986-1987)
- Cairnhill FC (1978-1979, 1983)
- Changi Constituency (1975-1984, 1986-1987)
- Changi United (1977, 1979-1980, 1985)
- Farrer Park United (1975-1987)
- Farrer Park Dynamos (1982-1986)
- Geylang Internationals (1975-1981, 1984-1986)
- Jalan Besar (1975)
- Jubilee SA (1980-1982, 1984)
- Jurong Town (1975-1978)
- Kaki Bukit SC (1978-1983, 1987)
- Police SA (1980-1987)
- Mountbatten FC (1980-1981)
- Pioneer Arsenal (1987)
- Ponggol Constituency (1976-1977, 1979)
- Queenstown (1975-1978)
- SAFSA (1975-1987)
- Sembawang Constituency (1975, 1977-1978, 1982)
- South Avenue SC (1985)
- Tampines Rovers (1976-1987)
- Tiong Bahru Constituency (1980-1987)
- Toa Payoh United (1975-1980, 1983-1987)

== Singapore Football League clubs ==
The Singapore Football League, commonly known as the SFL, is an FAS sanctioned football competition for clubs that are affiliated to the Football Association of Singapore. It makes up the second and third tier of football in Singapore, below the SPL and above the fourth tier Island Wide League.

Current clubs (see 2026-27 Singapore Football League):

Division 1

- Bishan Barx FC
- Jungfrau Punggol FC
- Police SA
- Project Vaults Oxley SC
- Singapore Cricket Club
- Singapore Khalsa Association FC
- South Avenue SC
- Tengah FC (formerly known as Woodlands United FC)

Note:
See "Splinter clubs" below for more details.

Division 2

- Admiralty CSN
- Frenz GDT Circuit FC
- GFA Victoria FC (formerly known as GFA Sporting Westlake FC)
- Gymkhana Gaulois FC
- Kaki Bukit SC
- Katong FC
- Starlight Soccerites
- Tanah Merah United
- Warwick Knights FC
- Yishun Mariners FC

== Island Wide League clubs ==
- Ayer Rajah Gryphons
- Bedok South Avenue SC
- Bukit Timah FC
- East Dragon FC
- Eastern Thunder FC (formerly known as Admiralty FC)
- Eunos Crescent
- Geylang Serai FC
- GFA Petir
- Jurong City FC (formerly known as Commonwealth Cosmos FC)
- Mattar Sailors
- Pasirian Lions
- Sembawang City
- Sembawang Park Rangers (formerly known as GFA Victoria FC)
- Simei United
- Singapore Xin Hua
- Singapore Recreation Club
- Tiong Bahru FC
- Westwood El'Junior FC
- Winchester Isla
- Woodlands Lions
- Woodlands Rangers (formerly known as Admiralty Rangers)

== Splinter clubs ==
Several clubs participating or which participated in the top flight S. League (1996 to 2017, rebranded as the SPL since 2018) were formed by the merger of several clubs, or by an amateur club turning professional. In several instances, a splinter amateur club remained, which continued or continues to participate in the NFL and the Singapore FA Cup (after the top flight teams stopped participating in the Singapore FA Cup from 1999 onwards).

These include:

- Balestier United RC - the amateur club that remained after the professional club, Balestier Central, was formed to compete in the inaugural S. League in 1996. Balestier Central is now Balestier Khalsa, playing in the Singapore Premier League (SPL).
- Police SA - the amateur club that remained after the professional club, Home United, was formed to compete in the inaugural S. League in 1996. Home United is now Lion City Sailors, playing in the SPL.
- SAFSA - the amateur club that remained after the professional club was formed in 1996 as Singapore Armed Forces FC to participate in the S. League, before changing its name to Warriors FC in 2013. Warriors FC ceased to exist.
- Tampines Rovers SC - the amateur club that remained after the professional club was formed in 1996, also as Tampines Rovers to participate in the S. League. The amateur club ceased to exist in the 2000s.
- Sembawang SC - the amateur club that remained after the professional club, Sembawang Rangers, was formed by the merger of the original club and Gibraltar Crescent to compete in the inaugural S. League in 1996. Tha amateur club ceased to exist in the 2000s.
- Tiong Bahru FC - the amateur club that remained after the professional club, Tiong Bahru United, was formed in 1996 to compete in the inaugural S. League. The professional club later changed its name to Tanjong Pagar United and plays in the SPL.

== Other SFL or IWL clubs ==
Other clubs that have won or finished runners up in the NFL/SFL or IWL, or reached the Singapore FA Cup final (since 1975), which were neither merged into a club above, nor listed above:

- Andrews Avenue SC
- Ang Mo Kio Constituency
- Bedok South Avenue SC
- Borussia Zamrud FC
- Bukit Merah FC
- Charlton FC
- Crescent Villa
- Dare to Dream FC
- Gambas Avenue SC
- Geylang Serai FC
- Hai Sing Park Rangers
- Kembangan United
- Keppel Monaco FC
- Newton Heath FC
- Pasir Panjang CSC
- Pioneer Ayer Rajah Soccerites
- Pioneer Constituency
- Prison Sports & Recreation Club
- Stamford West
- Starlight Soccerites
- Summerville FC
- Tampines Vipers
- Teban Spurs
- Telok Kurau United
- West United FC

Other recent or former SFL or IWL clubs not not listed above.

- Admiralty City
- Ang Mo Kio United FC
- Boon Keng SRC
- Changi Village SRC
- Elias Park FC
- Kallang Sportif Huskies FC
- Verde Cresta Combined SC

== Other post-war clubs ==
Other clubs (excluding British services, government departments and ethnic FAs) that reached the Singapore FA Cup final since World War II, not listed above.

- Amicable AA
- Argonauts
- Chinese Athletic
- Darul Afiah FC
- Indian Recreation Club
- Junior AA
- Kota Rajah SC
- Rovers SC
- Tiger SA

== Cosmoleague & EFL Clubs ==
- 1 Tanah Merah Barbarians FC
- Belgian and Luxembourg Association of Singapore
- British Club Lions FC
- British Exiles FC
- Casuals FC Singapore
- CBD Wanderers FC
- Exiles FC
- FC Mogura
- FC Myk
- FC Nippon
- Fighting Cocks FC
- Gaelic Lions FC
- Gaulois Sports Club
- German-Swiss All Stars FC
- Hibernians FC
- Hilderinc FC
- Hollandse FC
- Hotspurs FC
- International Lions FC
- J-Heat
- Mariners FC Singapore
- Olympique Gaulois
- Purple Monkeys FC
- Singapore Cricket Club (EFL)
- Singapore FC
- Singapore Vikings FC
- Tuan Gemuk Athletics
- Westland FC

== Mini-football clubs ==
Clubs playing mini football in Singapore.

=== Futsal Clubs ===
==== Brunei Elite Futsal League ====
- Kampung Buangkok Futsal Club

==== Kyna Futsal League ====
- Jurong United Futsal Club
- Lakeside Futsal Club
- Serangoon Coolies Futsal Team
- Woodlands Lions Futsal Club

=== Five-a-side, Six-a-side, Seven-a-side, Eight-a-side football ===
- Atlético de Madrid Singapore lions
- Azzurri FC
- Arsenal SG
- Boozebonitoz FC
- CP FOOTBALL
- Knockout FC
- Falah FC
- FC CERTIS RANGERS
- Federal C.F.
- Fifty34 United Football Club
- Kachang Puteh
- Kampung Buangkok FC
- Lightning Tigers FC
- Opera United
- SEFC
- Happy Family Futsal Team
- Republic Sports Association Futsal
- Joga bonito
- KAKIBALLERZ
- La Plata Juniors FC
- Mandai FC
- MUS Devils FC
- Raving Falcons FC
- Singapore Disability Sports Council
- Russla's Hustlers
- Sunrise FC
- Gaelic Lions Balotelitubbies
- Torpedo Rovers
- Hibernians Futsal Club
- Ronaldinho 10 FT

- Paris-Saint Germain Singapore Fan Club
- Olympique de Marseille Fan Club
- Manchester City FC Supporters Club Singapore
- SG Santos Futebol
- Sengkang District 19 FC
- Serangoon United FC
- Team Revolution Futsal
- Teck Whye Hounds FC
- Northern United FC
- Gay FC

== See also ==
- Football Association of Singapore
- S.League
- Singapore Cup
- Singapore Community Shield
- Singapore Football League
- Singapore League Cup
- Singapore FA Cup
- Football in Singapore
- List of Singapore's football leagues winners
