= 1988 National Football League (Singapore) =

14th season of the National Football League in Singapore

National Football League
- Season: 1988
- Champions: Div 1: Tyrwhitt Soccerites; Div 2: South Avenue SC

The 1988 National Football League was the 14th season of the National Football League in Singapore.

After the formation of the FAS Premier League in 1988, the NFL constituted the second and third levels of the Singapore football league system.

The league comprised two divisions, Division One and Division Two. Tyrwhitt Soccerites and Telok Kurau United, whose applications to join the inaugural FAS Premier League had failed, were placed in Division One.

Also in Division One were Farrer Park United, NFL Division One champions in 1982, and Toa Payoh United, runners up in 1983.

Tyrwhitt Soccerites won Division One and gained entry to the Premier League for the 1989 season. Tampines Rovers were relegated from the Premier League to NFL Division One for the 1989 season.

South Avenue SC won Division Two and were promoted to Division One for 1989, along with runners up Hai Sing Park Rangers. The bottom two clubs in Division One, Farrer Park United and Toa Payoh United, were relegated to Division Two. Division One had 8 teams for 1989.

== Division One ==
Teams:

- Farrer Park United
- Gibraltar Crescent
- Jubilee SA
- Kaki Bukit SC
- Pioneer Arsenal
- Telok Kurau United
- Toa Payoh United
- Tyrwhitt Soccerites

Just before the halfway stage, Pioneer Arsenal led from Tyrwhitt and Jubilee SA. Tyrwhitt Soccerites won Division One.

Farrer Park United and Toa Payoh United finished the bottom two.

== Division Two ==
- Changi United
- Hai Sing Park Rangers
- Marine Castle
- Punggol CSC
- Redhill Rangers
- Sembawang SC
- South Avenue SC
- Victoria FC

South Avenue SC won Division Two, with Hai Sing Park Rangers in second place.
