= Football in Singapore =

Football In Singapore
- 1st game
- (United Kingdom) British Engineers XI A vs British Engineers XI B (United Kingdom) (1889)
- Governing body: Football Association of Singapore
- National leagues: Singapore Premier League; Singapore Football League; Island Wide League; Women's Premier League; Women's National League
- National Cup: Singapore Cup
- FA Cup: Singapore FA Cup
- Season starter: Singapore Community Shield

International
- 1st international
- Singapore 2–3 South Korea (Singapore; 12 April 1953)
- Men's team: Singapore
- Women's team: Singapore ♀
- Boys' team (youth): Singapore U15s & 16s
- Stadium: National Stadium (Capacity: 55,000); Jalan Besar Stadium (Capacity: 6,000–8,000)

International honours
- Youth Olympics: Bronze (1) – 2010 (boys' U16)
- AFF Championship: Gold (4) – 1998, 2004, 2007, 2012 (men's)
- AFC Women's Cup: Bronze (2) – 1977, 1983 (women's)
- Lion City Cup: Silver (1) – 2011 (boys' U16); Bronze (1) – 2011 (boys' u15)

Association football, known more popularly as football, is considered the national sport of Singapore. Approximately 49% of the people in Singapore are interested in football. Association football is the most popular sport in Singapore.

The country is home to the Football Association of Singapore (FAS), the oldest football association in Asia, formed in 1892, based on the Football Association in England (which had been formed in 1863), Singapore having been a British colony at the time (as part of the Straits Settlements).

Despite the country having a relatively small population pool, it has been successful within South-East Asia, both in the Malaysia Cup, a domestic competition in Malaysia, and internationally, in the AFF Championship.

Singapore participated in the Malaysia Cup through a representative team, which came to be called the Singapore Lions in the 1980s and 1990s. The FAS withdrew the Singapore Lions from the Malaysia Cup in 1994. The FAS's LionsXII rejoined Malaysian domestic competition in 2012, winning a league title in 2013 and an FA Cup in 2015.

Singapore's participation in Malaysian domestic competition ceased after 2015, with the focus of the FAS on Singapore's own domestic leagues, the top tier of which is now known as the Singapore Premier League (SPL).

Singapore Premier League club Balestier Khalsa FC, as the successor to Fathul Karib, formed in 1898, are not only the oldest football club in Singapore, but the oldest football club in South-East Asia, as well as one of the oldest football clubs in all of Asia. The professional club, Balestier Khalsa, splintered from the amateur club in 1996 (as Balestier Central), Balester United Recreation Club, and can also claim to be a successor club to Fathul Karib.

== History ==
=== Early years ===
The earliest known football match played in Singapore was in 1889, between two teams of British engineers.

The Singapore Football Association (SFA), formed in 1892, was exempted from the formal requirements of the Societies Ordinance, as published in the Government Gazette in September that year.

At a meeting of the SFA held in August 1892, a challenge cup was arranged. The Singapore FA Cup continues to be played to this day.

In January 1904, the senior clubs in Singapore met and agreed to form a football league. There was another meeting later that month to discuss the formation of a football league for junior clubs. The formation of the league was confirmed in February 1904, with 10 teams having joined. The first match of the senior league was played on 1 March 1904, between Tanjong Pagar FC and YMCA, under the auspices of the Singapore Association Football League. In June 1904, a subscription list was raised to purchase a trophy for the league competition to be held annually. The winners in that first season were Band & Drums (1st Battalion Manchester Regiment).

In the early years, the participants in the league were the British forces and European and Eurasian clubs. Other communities, such as the Malays and Chinese had their own communal football associations, which organised tournaments for clubs within each community. The communal football associations, Singapore Chinese Football Association and the Malaya Football Association joined the league in 1921 and 1924 respectively.

On 14 May 1929, the SFA changed its name to the Singapore Amateur Football Association (SAFA), to distinguish itself from the Selangor Football Association.

With the exception of 1906 and the interruption of World War I, the league was played every year until the fall of Singapore to Japan in 1942, during World War II. The league resumed after the war, in 1947.

An inter-business competition, first started in 1927, was renamed the Singapore Business Houses Football League (SBHFL) in 1937. Due to the popularity of the SBHFL in the post-war period, a Singapore Business Houses Football Association (SBHFA) was formed in 1950.

The British services teams also had their own United Services League, organised by the United Services Football Association, which was discontinued in 1957.

SAFA became affiliated with FIFA in 1952.

In 1955, the year Singapore first achieved self-governance, the Singapore Government Services Football League (SGSFL) took place for the first time, organised by the Singapore Government Services Football Association. The SGSFL continued to be played until at least 1999.

SAFA switched to 90 minute games for the 1961 season. Before then, games had been 80 minutes long, and earlier, 70 minutes. Before then, shorter games had been thought necessary "because of the Malayan climate".

=== Post-independence ===
On 13 January 1966, after the independence of Singapore in 1965, the SAFA changed its name to the Football Association of Singapore (FAS).

In 1972, the Singapore Government created an inter-constituency football tournament, organised through the Singapore Sports Council.

When creating the National Football League (NFL) in 1975, N Ganesan, the deputy chairman of the FAS was quoted as saying:

"The idea is not to include the uniform groups or companies in the national league as they have the Government Services and Business Houses competition."[33]

Clubs had to re-form or rename as geographically-based clubs in order to play in the NFL. For example, International Contract Specialists were renamed "Geylang Internationals", going on to win the title in the first three seasons of the NFL (1975, 1976 and 1977).

"During the era when the local game's top players were still amateurs, it was not uncommon to see state representatives (in the colonial days) or national players (after independence) turning out for their company teams in the SBHFL which was covered extensively by the newspapers alongside with the main local leagues and the popular Malaya (later Malaysia) Cup tournaments."[21]

The SBHFA was praised in 1971 for its "active involvement in the promotion of football in Singapore", and the SBHFL had a record 28 teams in 1972. However, in the years following the formation of the NFL in 1975, and the FAS Premier League in 1988, the SBHFL gradually lost much of its previous lustre. A rule change in 1994 preventing players from playing for different teams in different leagues over the same period of time also led to the further decline of the SBHFL. After the FAS Premier League was formed in 1988 as the top level of Singapore league football above the NFL, SBHFL teams were not keen on or declined promotion to the FAS Premier League.

After the original National Stadium was built in Kallang in 1973, the Singapore team played its home games there. The vociferous home support came to be known as the "Kallang Roar". Prior to the National Stadium being built, Singapore had played its home matches at Jalan Besar Stadium, built in 1929.

The Football Association of Singapore was registered as a society under Singapore's Societies Act 1966 on 11 February 1982.

Goal 2010 was an objective set by then-Prime Minister Goh Chok Tong in 1998, for the national team to reach the 2010 FIFA World Cup. However, the goal was not met. Singapore has to date not reached the tournament stage of the FIFA World Cup.

Singapore's international successes have come in the ASEAN Championship, winners in 1998, 2004, 2006 and 2012.

Singapore's national team has qualified for the tournament stage of the AFC Asian Cup twice, as hosts in 1984, and for the 2027 tournament to be held in Saudi Arabia.

== Leagues organised by the FAS ==
In 1974, the FAS League had 118 teams playing in a three-tier hierarchy. For many years, levels two and three comprised several groups each, with teams at the top of the groups going through to a knock-out stage. The number of groups in the second and third tiers varied from year to year.

In 1975, the FAS introduced the National Football League (NFL), with 10 top teams in Division 1, and a further 20 teams split between Divisions 2 and 3. The amateur National Football League Division One had been the top level of domestic football in Singapore since 1975.

In 1987, the Island Wide League (IWL) was organised by the FAS as several regional grassroots leagues across Singapore, below the NFL. Clubs that had played in the FAS League prior to the formation of the NFL in 1975, and other clubs formed later, thus had the opportunity to play in an FAS-organised league.

The FAS had entered a representative team (Singapore FA, nicknamed the "Lions") in the Malaysia Cup up to 1981. Singapore was excluded from the newly formed Malaysian League from 1982 to 1984 (and thus from the Malaysia Cup, with qualification limited to the top 8 in the Malaysian League), but joined between 1985 and 1988.

With the top Singaporean players playing exclusively for the Singapore FA or other teams in the Malaysian League and Cup during this time, interest in the domestic league in Singapore dwindled. In an attempt to invigorate the domestic league, the FAS formed the semi-professional FAS Premier League in 1988. In 1994, two Australian teams played in the FAS Premier League.

In 1996, after the FAS withdrew the Singapore FA from the Malaysian Premier League in 1995, the FAS formed the fully professional S. League to replace the FAS Premier League. Invited foreign teams became a regular feature of the S. League.

The Women's Premier League (WPL), the top-flight for women's football league in Singapore, was formed by the FAS in 2000.

In 2002, several football clubs were found to be operating unlicensed gaming machines or gambling dens Several such clubs were found to be fronts for such illicit activity, and were closed down. The closure of several clubs in that period affected the lower tiers of Singapore football. In 2017, the authorities conducted investigations into the finances of the FAS and three S. League clubs.

In 2018, the S. League was rebranded as the Singapore Premier League (SPL). For the 2026-27 season, the remaining team in the SPL with foreign roots, Albirex Niigata Singapore, became localised as FC Jurong. Earlier, in 2020, the last remaining top flight club linked with Singapore government departments, Home United, was privated and changed its name to Lion City Sailors.

In 2022, the FAS directed all SPL clubs to cease jackpot operations, which was relied on by several clubs for funding. Going forward, funding would be provided by the "Unleash the Roar!" national project.

In 2022, FAS announced that plans to implement video assistant referee (VAR) technology were started since late 2021 and VAR technology will be in use in the near future. In 2023, FAS announced that VAR technology will be used by the SPL for the 2023 Singapore Premier League season.

Since 2025, the Singapore Premier League 2 has been the reserve league for SPL clubs. A precursor to SPL2 was the Prime League, for the reserve and youth players of S. League clubs, which was organised by the FAS from 1997 to 2017.

The Singapore football league system currently sees the SPL as the top level. Below, at levels two and three, are the two divisions of the NFL. The IWL is the fourth level.

== Other notable domestic leagues ==
As the leagues organised by the FAS over the years have had as one of their objectives the raising of the standard of football in Singapore, and of the Singapore national team, there have been restrictions on the number of foreign players any club can register or field. In 2000, it was announced that Division Two and Three clubs could only use local players.

The Cosmopolitan Football League (commonly known as the Cosmo League) was formed in 1975 (the same year that the FAS inaugurated the NFL), to cater for Singapore's growing expat population.

For the 2026-27 season, the Cosmo League has been incorporated into the Equatorial Football League.

== Domestic cup competitions ==
The Singapore FA Cup, first played in 1892, is one of the oldest football competitions in the world.

Between 1996 and 1998, the Football Association of Singapore limited the competition to clubs from the S.League (the top level of the Singapore football league system) only. In 1998, the Singapore League Cup, which had commenced in 1997, was renamed the Singapore Cup, in which only S. League clubs participated.

Since 1998, the Singapore FA Cup has been a competition for National Football League / Singapore Football League and Island Wide League clubs (at the second to fourth levels of the Singapore football league system), without participation by the first teams of clubs from the top level (the S. League, rebranded as the Singapore Premier League in 2018).

Between 2003 and 2017, S.League clubs were allowed to field their developmental Prime League teams in the Singapore FA Cup.

In 2006, the Singapore League Cup was revived as a second cup competition for S. League teams. It was discontinued after 2017.

== Youth and talent development ==
On 9 March 2021, Singapore launched a national football project called Unleash the Roar!, in line with the goal set by the FAS to qualify for the 2034 FIFA World Cup. On its website, it is described as "a national movement which aims to raise the levels of Singapore football and rally the nation behind a shared dream".

In 2025, former national footballer, Kadir Yahaya was appointed as director of football.

On 6 February 2024, the Singapore Youth League (SYL) was officially launched.

== Singapore's participation in Malaysian domestic competitions ==
A team representing Singapore (Singapore FA) participated in the Malaysia Cup from its inception in 1921. It also participated in the newly-formed Malaysian leagues from 1985 to 1994 (Malaysian League from 1985 to 1988, the Semi-Pro League from 1989 to 1993, and the Premier League in 1994). The FAS withdrew Singapore FA from Malaysian domestic tournaments in 1994. Singapore FA won the Malaysia Cup 24 times, and the Malaysian league twice.

Pursuant to an agreement between the FAS and the Football Association of Malaysia, The FAS's LionsXII rejoined Malaysian domestic competition, this time, the Malaysia Super League, between 2012 and 2015, finishing runners up in 2012 and winning in 2013. The agreement expired in 2015, and was not renewed. A Singapore team has not participated in Malaysian domestic competition since 2016.

Singaporeans gave good support to the Singapore team participaring in Malaysian domestic competitions, and the home support at the National Stadium became synonymous with the "Kallang Roar".

== Notable players ==
=== Singaporean players ===
Players who played primarily before 2000:

- Fandi Ahmad, the first Singaporean player to have played for a professional European club.
- Quah Kim Song
- Dollah Kassim
- Samad Allapitchay
- Terry Pathmanathan
- V. Sundramoorthy
- S Rajagopal
- Arshad Kamis
- David Lee
- Lim Tong Hai
- Mohamed Noh Hussein
- Nazri Nasir
- Malek Awab
- Borhan Abu Samah
- R. Suriamurthi

For players who played mainly after 2000, see Singapore players with the most appearances and most goals for the national team.

=== Foreign players who played for Singapore FA ===
- Abbas Saad

== National teams ==
The FAS organises the men's, women's and youth national teams.

The men's senior team is the second most successful team in the AFF Championship with 4 titles (1998, 2004, 2007 and 2012). However, Singapore has not won any competitive international title at senior level since 2012.

National youth teams have been and are organised by age group:

- Singapore national under-17 football team
- Singapore national under-20 football team
- Singapore national under-21 football team
- Singapore national under-23 football team

The national Under-16 team claimed bronze in the football event of the inaugural Youth Olympic Games in 2010, and was runner-up for the 23rd Lion City Cup in 2011. The national Under-15 team finished as second runner up in the 2011 Lion City Cup.

The Under-23 team has won the following honours:

- Southeast Asian Games
  - Bronze medal (3): 2007, 2009 and 2013
- Merlion Cup
  - Champions (1): 2019
- Pestabola Merdeka
  - Third Place (1): 2013

== Stadia ==
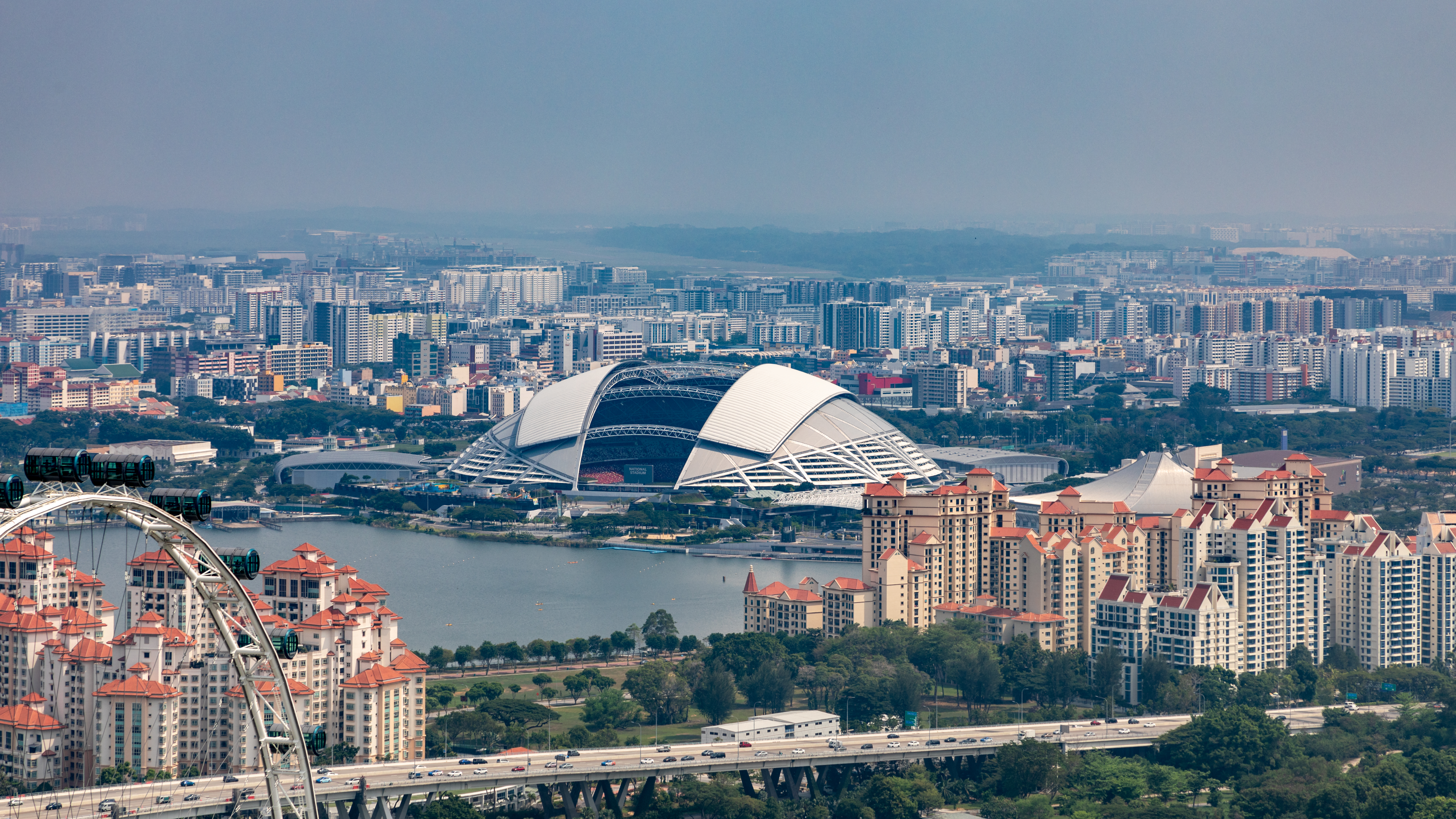
National Stadium

=== National teams ===
The former National Stadium was the home of the Singapore national team and Singapore FA.

When the original National Stadium in Kallang was earmarked for redevelopment in 2011, the national team moved to Jalan Besar Stadium. The Kallang site was redeveloped as the Singapore Sports Hub, a multi-purpose sports complex, completed in 2014, including the new National Stadium.

Since then, the Singapore national men's team uses both the new National Stadium (current capacity 55,000) and Jalan Besar Stadium (current capacity 6,500) as its home grounds, depending on the expected attendance.

The women's national team play their home games at various stadia, most recently at Bukit Gombak Stadium.

=== FAS domestic competitions ===
The following stadia are currently used for SPL games:

- Jalan Besar Stadium, home ground for Lion City Sailors FC and Young Lions FC.
- Our Tampines Hub, home ground for Tampines Rovers FC and Geylang International FC.
- Bishan Stadium, home ground for Balestier Khalsa FC and Hougang United FC.
- Jurong East Stadium, home ground for FC Jurong and Tanjong Pagar United FC.

SFL and Singapore FA Cup games are played in the above stadia (excluding Jalan Besar Stadium), as well as the following:

- Bedok Stadium.
- Bukit Gombak Stadium.
- Choa Chu Kang Stadium.
- Hougang Stadium.
- Woodlands Stadium.
- Yishun Stadium.

== Fans ==
While football is a popular sport in Singapore, a 2023 study found that 65% of Singaporeans do not support the national team or local clubs. Instead, Singaporeans tend to follow European football, particularly English football. The English Premier League (EPL) has become a sports television staple among Singapore football fans since its inaugural season in 1992-93, and EPL clubs have built up sizeable fan bases in Singapore. Singaporeans tend to support clubs that were successful in their childhood.

Of countries outside of the United Kingdom, Singapore pays significant subscriber rates to watch EPL games.

== Seasons ==
The following articles detail the major results and events in each season since 2020.

2010s:	2010	2011	2012	2013	2014	2015	2016	2017	2018	2019
2020s:	2020	2021	2022	2023	2024	2025	2026–27			

== Attendances ==
The football club from Singapore with the highest average home attendance per league season:

Season	Club	Average
2015	LionsXII	4,511
2014	LionsXII	6,093

== See also ==
- Football Association of Singapore
- List of football clubs in Singapore
- Singapore football league system
- Singapore national futsal team
- Kallang Roar the Movie
- List of stadiums in Singapore
