= Toa Payoh United =

Singaporean football club

Toa Payoh United (Chinese: 大巴窑联; pinyin: Dàbāyáo Lián) is a football club formed in Toa Payoh, Singapore, in 1972. It played in the FAS League, and was one of the 10 clubs selected for the revamped National Football League (NFL) Division One, formed by the Football Association of Singapore (FAS) in 1975.

The club was originally formed in 1972 as Singapore Marble Football Club but later changed its name to Toa Payoh United to meet the FAS's requirement that clubs' names represent a constituency or district for the revamped league, having been allocated Toa Payoh Stadium for the inaugural NFL in 1975.

The popular football coach Choo Seng Quee was involved in the formation of the club in 1972, and was its first coach.

Toa Payoh United finished runners up in the NFL Division One in 1983, their highest ever position in the Singapore football league system. The team won the Singapore FA Cup (then known as the President's Cup) in 1977 and 1979.

The club were relegated to NFL Division Two in 1980, but returned to Division One in 1983 after finishing runners up in Division Two in 1982, and remained in the top division until 1987..

The club was not selected for the FAS Premier League formed in 1988, and remained in Division One of the NFL in 1988, then the second level of Singapore football after the formation of the FAS Premier League. The club remained in the NFL until 1990, dropping into the Island Wide League the following year.

Between the mid-1970s and the early 1980s, their star player was Mohamed Noh Hussein, affectionately known as "Mat Noh", a leading player in the Singapore team that won the Malaysia Cup in 1977.

After he retired as a player, Mat Noh was appointed coach of Toa Payoh United in the mid-1980s.

The club does not currently play in any league organised by the FAS, that is the Singapore Premier League (formerly the S. League, that replaced the FAS Premier League in 1996), the Singapore Football League (previously the NFL) or the Island Wide League, which are at levels 1 to 4 of the Singapore football league system.
