= David Low (footballer) =

Singaporean footballer

Personal information
- Date of birth: 23 November 1983 (age 42)
- Place of birth: Singapore
- Position: Midfielder

Senior career*
Years	Team	Apps	(Gls)
2001	Stellas FC		
2005	Tampines Rovers SC 1951		
2006	Tampines Rovers FC		
2007	South West Phoenix FC		
2008	Western Mass Pioneers		
2008	Offenburger FV		
2009	FC Concordia Basel		
2009	Buki TK		
2010	Geylang United		
2010	Eunos Crescent FC		
2011	J.W. Rangsit F.C.		
2011	Keppel Monaco		
2012	Khoromkhon FC		
2013	Otago United		
2014	Chivas Reserve		
2014	Santa Ana Winds FC		
2015	Canon Yaoundé		
2016	Cosmos de Bafia		
2018	NEC Amateur		
2019	Changi Village SRC		
2019–2023	Singapore Vikings		
2023	Techiman Heroes SC		
2025	Jurong United FC (futsal)		

Managerial career
- 2018: SC NEC Youth (interim)
- 2019: Changi Village SRC (player-coach)
- 2025: Woodlands Lions FC (assistant)
- * Club domestic league appearances and goals

David Low (born 23 November 1983 in Singapore) is a Singaporean former footballer. He is mostly known for his peripatetic career which has taken him to 11 countries, including Singapore and sees retired American footballer Jay DeMerit as an inspiration.

== Early life ==
Living in South Africa for 7 years, Low was called up to the Singaporean National Service aged 17. He is the second out of four brothers after his elder twin brother, Josh.

== Career ==
=== New Zealand ===
During the 2013–14 New Zealand Football Championship, Low featured as part of Otago United's defence.

=== Mongolia ===
In 2012, Low moved to Mongolia to join Khoromkhon in the Mongolian Premier League. Living with other foreign players, he helped the club secure the Borgio Cup after a 7–0 win over Ulaanbaatar City Bank in the final. Khoromkhon later finished second in the league that season.

=== Cameroon ===
Low joined Canon Yaoundé in 2015, competing in Cameroon’s Elite One league.

The following year, he moved to Cosmos de Bafia. He appeared on the bench in a league match against Botafogo, attracting curiosity about his Asian background, with many mistaking him for Chinese. Low left the club in mid-2016 and returned to Singapore.

In 2018, he turned down an offer from Coton Sport FC de Garoua due to concerns over accommodation and security, as the club was based near areas affected by the Boko Haram insurgency.

=== Netherlands ===
Later in 2018, Low signed with Dutch club NEC Nijmegen in the Eerste Divisie, the country’s second tier, where he featured as a non-contract player.

=== Ghana ===
In 2023, Low resumed his professional career with Techiman Heroes SC in Ghana’s Division One League.

=== Return to Singapore ===
After retiring from professional football, Low joined Jurong United futsal team, competing in the amateur Kyna Futsal League. At the same time, he took up a role as assistant coach with Woodlands Lions FC in the Singapore Island Wide League. He also founded and currently operates the DL Scouting Agency.

== Personal life ==
Low returned to Singapore in 2016 and worked briefly as a security systems administrator in a bank. He has a twin brother who previously signed for a State League football club in Western Australia.
