= SCFA =

SCFA may refer to:

- Andrés Sabella Gálvez International Airport, Chile
- Short-chain fatty acid, a fatty acid with an aliphatic tail of less than 6 carbon atoms
- Singapore Chinese Football Association, a sub-association of Singapore FA
- Somalia-China Friendship Association
- Southern California Football Association
