= Hamilton Thorp =

Australian soccer player

Personal information
- Date of birth: 21 August 1973 (age 53)
- Place of birth: Darwin, Northern Territory, Australia
- Height: 1.91 m (6 ft 3 in)
- Position: Striker

Youth career
- 1992–1993: Rochdale

Senior career*
Years	Team	Apps	(Gls)
1994	Darwin Cubs		
1995–1997	West Adelaide	42	(11)
1997–1998	Portsmouth	9	(1)
1998–1999	Adelaide Sharks	15	(3)
1999–2000	Perth Glory	17	(0)
2000	Tanjong Pagar United FC	11	(3)
2000	Sorrento	5	(8)
2000–2001	Parramatta Power	10	(2)
2002	Manly Warringah Dolphins		
2002–2003	Northern Spirit	7	(0)
2003–2004	IFK Norrköping	13	(1)
2004	IF Sylvia	10	(2)
2004	Raufoss	11	(2)
2007	Manly United	28	(25)
- * Club domestic league appearances and goals as of 00:42, 20 October 2015 (UTC) ‡ National team caps and goals as of 00:42, 20 October 2015 (UTC)

Hamilton Thorp (born 21 August 1973) is an Australian former professional football player.

== Early life ==
Thorp is one of a small number of professional footballers to grow up in Darwin.

== Career ==
=== Club ===
In the early 1990s Thorp moved to England, where he spent a season with Rochdale.

Thorp played in the FAS Premier League as a teenager for Darwin Cubs.

In 1997, Thorp signed for English Football League First Division side Portsmouth on the recommendation of then-Australia manager Terry Venables. He played seven league matches and two Football League Cup games for the side, scoring one goal.

He later returned to Australia, moving from Perth Glory to Parramatta Power in 2000.

In 2003, Thorp played for Swedish side Norrköping, but was released after one season when the club elected not to take up a contractual option for a second year.

Thorp joined Norwegian club Raufoss in 2004, making 11 appearances and scoring once in the Norwegian First Division.

=== International ===
Thorp represented the Australian Schoolboys in the early 1990s.

== Honours ==
=== Club ===
Perth Glory

- National Soccer League Premiership: 1999–2000

=== Individual ===
- NSW Super League Golden Boot: 2002

== See also ==
- List of Perth Glory FC players
