= Tay Lian Teck =

Singaporean businessman

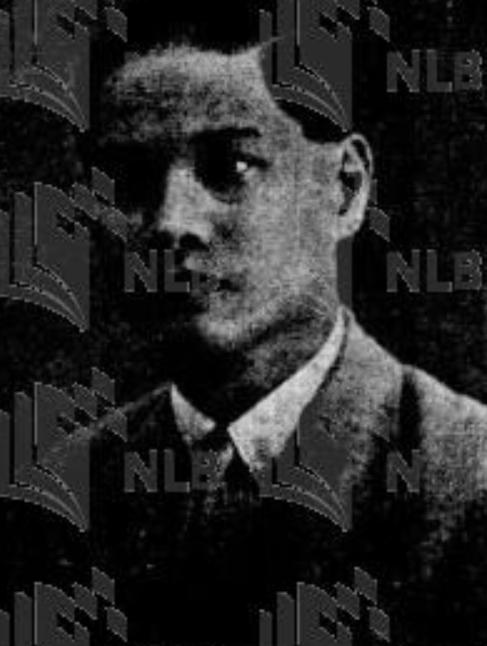
Tay Lian Teck

Tay Lian Teck (Chinese: 郑连德; 1899 — February 1947) was a prominent businessman, member of the Municipal Commission of Singapore, member of the Legislative Council of the Straits Settlements and president of the Singapore Chinese Football Association.

== Early life and education ==
Tay began attending Victoria School in 1906. He completed the Junior Cambridge examination at the age of 13 and the Senior Cambridge examination at the age of 14.

== Career ==
After graduating from Victoria School, he became a teacher there. He served as the Honorary Secretary of the Singapore Chinese Football Association from 1925 to 1930, and served as the association's president from 1935 to 1941. In 1932, he became a member of the Municipal Commission of Singapore. He was a committee member of the Singapore Chinese Chamber of Commerce and Industry from 1933 to 1941. He was appointed a Nominated Unofficial Member of the Legislative Council of the Straits Settlements in 1935, following the retirement of council member Tan Cheng Lock. He was a committee member of the Chinese Advisory Board from 1935 to 1941. He resigned from the municipal commission in 1936 in order to devote more time to his business affairs and the legislative council. In 1939, he became a member of the Singapore Improvement Trust. He was reappointed a nominated unofficial member of the legislative council for another three years in 1941.

He was the secretary of the Ho Hong Steamship Company, Ho Hong Oil Mills and the Ho Hong Portland Cement Company, and was on the board of directors of several other prominent companies in Singapore. He was the president of the Straits Chinese Recreation Club and a member of the Singapore Amateur Football Association.

== Personal life and death ==
Tay married Grace Tan Chew Neo, a pioneer of community and social work in Singapore. They had two daughters, musician Phyllis Tay and actress Gracia Tay.

Tay was aboard the SS Kuala when it was bombed by the Japanese in February 1942. He died during the bombing. In 1947, the roads Kee Sun Road, Kee Sun Avenue and Kee Sun Drive were renamed Tay Lian Teck Road, Tay Lian Teck Avenue and Tay Lian Teck Drive respectively, after him. A memorial was erected in his honour in 1948.
