= 2019 Singapore FA Cup =

2019 Football Association Cup
Singapore FA Cup

Tournament details
- Country: Singapore
- Dates: 17 September – 20 October 2019

Final positions
- Champions: Tiong Bahru FC
- Runners-up: Yishun Sentek Mariners
- Third place: Project Vaults Oxley SC
- (Note: All statistics do not include penalty shoot-outs)

The 2019 Singapore FA Cup is the latest season of the FAS Football Association Cup, which is only open to teams from Singapore National Football League (NFL) and Island Wide League (IWL) in Singapore.

Bukit Timah Juniors player Mohd Khairul was given a fine and three-year ban from all football activities for his 'gross misconduct and violent conduct' during the match between Bukit Timah Juniors and Admiralty Rangers FC on 7 September 2019.

On 15 September 2019, the match between Jungfrau Punggol and Kembangan FC at Woodlands Stadium was abandoned prematurely at the 58th minute by the match referee due to an incident that was deemed to compromise the safety and security of the match officials. Three players from Kembangan FC was punished, while the team was given a fine of $7,500.00 and a ban from participating in FAS FA Cup 2020.

Tiong Bahru FC won the 2019 Football Association of Singapore (FAS) FA Cup after defeating defending champions Yishun Sentek Mariners FC on 20 October 2019. The NFL Division 1 champions exacted revenge for 2018 final loss to the same opponents as they completed a domestic double at Jalan Besar Stadium.

The champions received $10,000 prize money and the FA Cup trophy. The first and second runners-up will received $5,000 and $2,000 from the Football Association of Singapore respectively.

== Teams ==
The Singapore FA Cup is a knockout competition with 16 IWL teams taking part from the preliminary round on 7 September 2019. 37 teams from the Singapore Football League system (21 teams in total from the Singapore Football League 1 and 2, and the 16 from the Island Wide League) will be contesting in the 2019 competition.

2018 FA Cup champions, 2018 NFL Division One and Division Two champions will advance directly to the third round of the competition.

== Preliminary Round ==
7 September 2019	Commonwealth Cosmos	2-1	Kallang Sportif Huskies	Hougang Stadium

7 September 2019	Winchester Isla FC	1-2	Geylang Serai FC	Jalan Besar Stadium

7 September 2019	Boon Keng SRC	0-3*	Kembangan United	-

7 September 2019	Bukit Timah Juniors	2-0	Admiralty Rangers	Bukit Gombak Stadium
Note: Admiralty Rangers are through to the next round.

8 September 2019	Gymkhana FC	0-3*	Yishun FC	Yishun Stadium

8 September 2019	Changi Village SRC	1-2	Prisons SRC	Hougang Stadium

8 September 2019	Woodlands Warriors	1-5	Simei United	Bukit Gombak Stadium

8 September 2019	Bedok South Avenue	5-0	GDT Circuit FC	Jurong East Stadium

== Round of 32 ==
14 September 2019	GFA Sporting Westlake	2-0	Commonwealth Cosmos	Jurong West Stadium

14 September 2019	Siglap FC	1-2	Admiralty CSC	Hougang Stadium

14 September 2019	SAFSA	7-1	GFA Victoria	Jurong West Stadium

15 September 2019	Warwick Knights	7-1	Admiralty Rangers	Yishun Stadium

15 September 2019	Starlight Soccerites	0-3	South Avenue SC	Serangoon Stadium

15 September 2019	Eunos Crescent	3-1	Simei United	Jurong West Stadium

15 September 2019	Bishan Barx FC	2-2(p)	Bedok South Avenue	Serangoon Stadium

15 September 2019	Jungfrau Punggol	v	Kembangan United	Woodlands Stadium
		Report
Note: Match abandoned. Jungfrau Punggol are through to the next round.

23 September 2019	Police SA	8-0	Yishun FC	Jalan Besar Stadium

24 September 2019	Singapore Cricket Club	(p)3-3	Geylang Serai FC	Jalan Besar Stadium

25 September 2019	Kaki Bukit SC	4-3	Prisons SRC	Choa Chu Kang Stadium

Project Vaults Oxley	v	Balestier United
Note: Project Vaults Oxley are through to the next round.

Admiralty FC	v	Katong FC
Note: Katong FC are through to the next round.

== Round of 16 ==
28 September 2019	GFA Sporting Westlake	3-0	Admiralty CSC	Hougang Stadium

28 September 2019	Singapore Cricket Club	1-4	SAFSA	Toa Payoh Stadium

28 September 2019	Jungfrau Punggol	3-1	Katong FC	Choa Chu Kang Stadium

28 September 2019	Warwick Knights	3-3 (4–5 p)	Yishun Sentek Mariners	Clementi Stadium

29 September 2019	Police SA	0-3	Tiong Bahru FC	Bedok Stadium

2 October 2019	Kaki Bukit SC	2-3	South Avenue SC	Hougang Stadium

2 October 2019	Eunos Crescent	0-5	Project Vaults Oxley	Hougang Stadium
		Report	Nordine Talhi; Adam Xu; Adam Xu; Zul Feshal; Zul Feshal

2 October 2019	Bedok South Avenue	0-5	Singapore Khalsa Association	Jalan Besar Stadium

== Quarter Finals ==
5 October 2019	Project Vaults Oxley	4-2	Singapore Khalsa Association	Yishun Stadium
	Adam Xu; Zul Feshal; Nurisham Jupri; Adam Xu	Report

5 October 2019	Tiong Bahru FC	(p)2-2	South Avenue SC	Bukit Gombak Stadium

5 October 2019	Jungfrau Punggol	1-2	Yishun Sentek Mariners	Hougang Stadium

5 October 2019	GFA Sporting Westlake	1-2	SAFSA	Jurong West Stadium

== Semi Finals ==
12 October 2019	SAFSA	0-3	Yishun Sentek Mariners	Hougang Stadium

12 October 2019	Tiong Bahru FC	2-0	Project Vaults Oxley	Jurong West Stadium

== Third Placing ==
20 October 2019	SAFSA	1-2	Project Vaults Oxley	Jalan Besar Stadium
17:00 UTC+8	Idraki Adnan 82'	Report	Jonathan Xu 80'; Fareez Rahman 84'

== Finals ==
20 October 2019	Yishun Sentek Mariners	1-2	Tiong Bahru FC	Jalan Besar Stadium
20:00 UTC+8	Farouq Farkhan 66'	Report	Nurhilmi Jasni 39'; Syukri Noorhaizam 45'	Stadium: Jalan Besar Stadium
