= Island Wide League (Singapore) =

- Organising body: Football Association of Singapore (FAS)
- Founded: 1987; 39 years ago
- Country: Singapore
- Number of clubs: 21 (7 each in Groups A, B and C)
- Level on pyramid: 4
- Promotion to: Singapore Football League Division 2
- Relegation to: No relegation
- Domestic cup: Singapore FA Cup
- Current champions: Tiong Bahru FC
- Website: Island Wide League
- Current: 2026 Island Wide League

The Island Wide League (IWL) is a league of amateur football clubs from Singapore that are affiliated with the Football Association of Singapore (FAS). It is at the fourth tier of the Singapore football league system.

== Background ==
The Island Wide League (IWL) was organised by the FAS in 1987 as several regional grassroots leagues across Singapore.

The IWL served as the fourth level of the Singapore football league system, below the three divisions of the National Football League.

When the semi-professional FAS Premier League was formed in 1988 with the selection of 8 leading clubs as the top level of Singapore football, the amateur NFL Divisions One and Two continued as the next two levels. The IWL continued as the fourth level.

In the inaugural season of the IWL in 1987, there were five regional centres, with the top two teams from four groups and the top team of fifth qualifying for the preliminary stage of the 1988 President's Cup. The preliminary stage of the 1988 President's Cup was played on a double knock out basis, with the top two qualifying for the President's Cup proper (joining the Premier League and NFL clubs), and a place in Division Two of the NFL in 1989. The same format was used in 1988, but with eight centres instead of just five.

In 1989, there were six centres. However, only the winners qualified for the second stage, which consisted of two groups of three teams, with teams in each group playing each other in a round-robin tournament. The winners of the two second stage groups qualified for Division Two of the NFL in 1990 alongside the top two teams from 1988, as the withdrawal of Changi CSC from the Premier League and Geylang West from the NFL required to be filled.

The number of centres and teams fluctuated from year to year. In 1990, there were six centres, with 36 teams were divided between the six centres. The tournament reverted to a double knock out tournament for the second stage.

In several of the following seasons, other teams from the IWL were incorporated into the NFL as its Division 3. Up to 2013, NFL Division 3 was the fourth level of Singapore football, with the IWL as the fifth.

In 2002, several lower tier football clubs were found to be operating gaming machines and pool tables.

For the 2017 season, the 12 IWL clubs from the 2016 season were added to the NFL (now the SFL), to re-create a Division 2, which had been merged with Division 1 in a 2016 revamp of the NFL. The re-created Division 2 of the NFL was the third tier in Singapore football behind the S. League (which had replaced the FAS Premier League as the top level of Singapore football in 1996) and the NFL Division 1.

There was no IWL in 2017. The IWL resumed in 2018 as the fourth tier of Singapore football.

In all, there have been several years since the IWL's formation when there was no competition, most recently in 2020 and 2021 due to the COVID-19 pandemic.

== System ==
The league now makes up the fourth tier of football in Singapore after the fully professional Singapore Premier League (SPL), and the two divisions of the amateur Singapore Football League (SFL).

The IWL was restructured in 2016 and moved away from a pure league format. Since 2016, the IWL has been structured in a group stage (single round-robin league system), followed by a knock-out stage.

The 21 teams in the IWL are currently divided into three groups (A, B and C) and the top two in each group, and the best two third-finishers, go through to the knock-out phase.

The two finalists are promoted to the SFL Division 2, while the bottom two clubs in the SFL 2 take their places in the IWL.

== Island Wide League clubs as of 2026 ==
- Ayer Rajah Gryphons
- Bedok South Avenue SC
- Bukit Timah FC
- East Dragon FC
- Eastern Thunder FC
- Eunos Crescent
- Geylang Serai FC
- GFA Petir
- Jurong City FC
- Mattar Sailors
- Pasirian Lions
- Sembawang City
- Sembawang Park Rangers
- Simei United
- Singapore Xin Hua
- Singapore Recreation Club
- Tiong Bahru FC
- Westwood El'Junior FC
- Winchester Isla
- Woodlands Lions
- Woodlands Rangers

== Past winners and runners up ==
For the level in Singapore in each year, see under List of Singapore's football leagues winners.

Season	Winner	Runners Up/ Losing Finalist	Score	Ref.
1987	Geylang West	Ang Mo Kio CSC	group stage followed by double knock-out stage	
1988	Stamford West	Teban Spurs	"	
1989	(1) Admiralty FC & (2) Jalan Mulia	-	Two second round group winners	
1990	Charlton SC	Bukit Merah CSC	group stage followed by double knock-out stage	
1991	Wellington FC	Mountbatten	"	
1992	Commonwealth Palace FC	Labrador Juniors	"	
1993				
1994				
1997				
1999	Singapore Recreation Club			
2000				
2002–2005	No records (Note: In 2002, several lower tier football clubs were found to be operating unlicensed gaming machines or gambling dens. Several such clubs were found to be fronts for such illicit activity, and were closed down. The closure of several clubs in that period affected the Island Wide League.)			
2007	Crescent Villa			
2010	Sporting Westlake	Dare To Dream FC	(league format)	
2011	Siglap CSC	Newton Heath FC	(league format)	
2012	Vipers FC	Warwick Knights FC	(league format)	
2013	Yishun Sentek Mariners	Kembangan United	(league format)	
2014	Kembangan United	Pioneer Ayer Rajah Soccerites	(league format)	
2015	South Avenue SC		(league format)	
2016	SAFSA (Note: The amateur club that remained after the professional club was formed in 1996 as Singapore Armed Forces FC to participate in the S. League, before changing its name to Warriors FC in 2013.)	Balestier United RC (Note: The amateur club that remained after the professional club, Balestier Central, was formed to compete in the inaugural S. League in 1996.)	3-1	
2017	Competition not held			
2018	Project Vault Oxley	Siglap FC	1-0	
2019	Commonwealth Cosmos	Geylang Serai FC	1-0	
2020	Competition not held (Note: Amateur competitions were not held in Singapore in 2020 and 2021 due to the COVID-19 pandemic.)			
2021	Competition not held			
2022	Xin Hua FC	Kaki Bukit SC	2-0	
2023	Bedok South Avenue SC	Tengah FC	2-1	
2024	GDT Circuit FC	Westwood El'Junior	2-1	
2025	Gymkhana FC	Tanah Merah United	3-2	
2026	Tiong Bahru FC	Jurong City FC	3-0	

== Former clubs (2022 to date) ==
Excluding clubs currently playing in the SFL or referred to above.

- Admiralty City (est. 2025) (2025)
- Balestier United RC (2023-2024)
- East Coast United (2022-2024)
- Marsiling Causeway Bay (2022–2023)
- Prisons SRC (2022–2023)
- Verde Cresta Combined SC (2023-2025)
- Woodlands Warriors (2022)
- Yishun FC (2023)
