= Cyrille Ndongo-Keller =

Cameroonian footballer and coach

Cyrille Ndongo-Keller (born 16 February 1974) is a Cameroonian football coach and former player who played as a midfielder.

== Career ==
Ndongo-Keller grew up in the Yaoundé neighborhoods of Mballa II and Nlongkak. He started his career in Olympic Mvolyé and went on to top-tier team Tonnerre Yaoundé in 1991. While here he represented Cameroon in the 1993 FIFA World Youth Championship, where Cameroon was grouped with Colombia, Russia and Australia.

In the summer of 1993 he migrated to Australia where he signed with Parramatta Eagles. After a four-month stint in Darwin Cubs from March to July 1994 he played three seasons in Adelaide Sharks. In 1995 he received his first and only cap for the Cameroon national team in an African Nations Cup qualifier against Malawi, donning the number 9 jersey formerly belonging to Roger Milla. In 1997 he had a brief stint with Yokohama Flugels in Japan.

He settled in Australia where he coached the NSW Sapphires women's team in 1999–2000, and later set up his own football academy and sports entrepreneurship company.
