= 1892 Singapore Amateur Football Association Challenge Cup =

FAS association

1892 Singapore Amateur Football Association Challenge Cup was the inaugural season of the Amateur Challenge Cup, the predecessor of the Singapore Cup.

The Final was played on 27 June 1892 between Singapore Engineers and Royal Artillery, the match ending with a 2–2 draw. In the replay, held on 8 July 1892, the Engineers trounced its opponent 6–2.

== Round 1 ==
Home team	Score	Away team
Singapore Cricket Club	1–0	58th Regiment II
Royal Engineers	4–2	Police
58th Regiment I	1–2	Royal Artillery
Singapore Engineers	w/o	Raffles School

== Semi-final ==
Home team	Score	Away team
Royal Artillery	0–0	Royal Engineers
Singapore Engineers	2–1	Singapore Cricket Club

=== Replay ===
Home team	Score	Away team
Royal Engineers	1–1	Royal Artillery

=== Second Replay ===
Home team	Score	Away team
Royal Artillery		Royal Engineers

== Final ==
27 June 1892

Royal Artillery	2–2	Singapore Engineers

=== Replay ===
8 July 1892

Singapore Engineers	6–2	Royal Artillery
