= 1894 Singapore Amateur Football Association Challenge Cup =

1894 Singapore Amateur Football Association Challenge Cup was the third season of the Amateur Challenge Cup, the predecessor of the Singapore Cup.

Two teams of the 10th Lincolnshire Regiment met in the final, which wasn't settled throughout six replays. After the sixth replay, all 22 players names were entered into a hat, and 11 names were drawn out a hat to receive winners' medals, 8 of them from the second team and 3 from the first team.

== Round 1 ==
Home team	Score	Away team
Royal Engineers	1–4	10th Linc. Regiment I

== Semi-final ==
Home team	Score	Away team
Royal Artillery	0–3	10th Linc. Regiment II
10th Linc. Regiment I	1–0	Singapore Cricket Club'

== Final ==
7 September 1894

10th Linc. Regiment I	0–0	10th Linc. Regiment II

=== Replay ===
10 September 1894

10th Linc. Regiment I	0–0	10th Linc. Regiment II

=== Second Replay ===
14 September 1894

10th Linc. Regiment I	2–2	10th Linc. Regiment II

=== Third Replay ===
21 October 1894

10th Linc. Regiment I	1–1	10th Linc. Regiment II

=== Fourth Replay ===
11 October 1894

10th Linc. Regiment I	0–0	10th Linc. Regiment II

=== Fifth Replay ===
29 October 1894

10th Linc. Regiment I	1–1	10th Linc. Regiment II

=== Sixth Replay ===
10th Linc. Regiment I	drawn	10th Linc. Regiment II
