= Singapore at the AFC Asian Cup =

Singapore national football team has participated in the AFC Asian Cup since the start of the tournament. Since its inception in 1956, Singapore had not advanced through the qualifying rounds except in the 1984 AFC Asian Cup in which they qualified by hosting the tournament. In November 2025, Singapore qualified through the qualifying rounds for the 2027 AFC Asian Cup, marking the first time they did so.

== 1984 AFC Asian Cup ==
Regarded as a much weaker team in Asia, Singapore was eliminated from the group stage with four points, a 2–0 win over India and a 1–1 draw with Iran. The draw with Iran was considered a shock result as Iran was three times champions of the tournament.

=== Group B ===
Team	Pld	W	D	L	GF	GA	GD	Pts
China	4	3	0	1	10	2	+8	6
Iran	4	2	2	0	6	1	+5	6
United Arab Emirates	4	2	0	2	3	8	−5	4
Singapore	4	1	1	2	3	4	−1	3
India	4	0	1	3	0	7	−7	1

2 December 1984
21:00

Singapore	2–0	India
Awab 36'; Saad 81'

National Stadium, Singapore
Attendance: 21,000
Referee: Antonio Márquez (Mexico)

5 December 1984
21:00

Singapore	0–2	China
		Jia Xiuquan 21'; Zhao Dayu 39'

National Stadium, Singapore
Attendance: 20,752
Referee: Ahmed Jassim (Bahrain)

8 December 1984
21:00

Singapore	0–1	United Arab Emirates
		Abdulrahman 62'

National Stadium, Singapore
Attendance: 15,000
Referee: Jassim Mandi (Bahrain)

10 December 1984
19:00

Singapore	1–1	Iran
Saad 61'		Shahrokh Bayani 55' (pen.)

National Stadium, Singapore
Attendance: 2,000
Referee: Abu Wahid Shanbe (Oman)

== Singapore's performance in AFC Asian Cup ==
AFC Asian Cup record								Asian Cup qualification					
Year	Result	GP	W	D	L	GS	GA	GP	W	D	L	GS	GA
(Hong Kong) 1956	Withdrew												
(South Korea) 1960	Did not qualify							2	0	0	2	3	9
(Israel) 1964	Withdrew												
(Iran) 1968	Did not qualify							4	0	1	3	2	10
(Thailand) 1972	Withdrew												
(Iran) 1976	Did not qualify							2	0	0	2	1	3
(Kuwait) 1980	Did not qualify							3	0	0	3	1	11
(Singapore) 1984	Round 1	4	1	1	2	3	4	Qualified as hosts					
(Qatar) 1988	Withdrew												
(Japan) 1992	Did not qualify							3	0	1	2	2	4
(United Arab Emirates) 1996	Did not qualify							6	3	3	0	16	7
(Lebanon) 2000	Did not qualify							3	2	0	1	2	3
(China) 2004	Did not qualify							8	3	1	4	8	11
(Indonesia) (Malaysia) (Thailand) (Vietnam) 2007	Did not qualify							5	1	1	3	4	6
(Qatar) 2011	Did not qualify							6	2	0	4	6	15
(Australia) 2015	Did not qualify							6	1	0	5	4	17
(United Arab Emirates) 2019	Did not qualify							13	3	3	7	12	17
(Qatar) 2023	Did not qualify							8	2	1	5	7	22
Total	Best: Round 1	4	1	1	2	3	4	71	18	11	42	74	136
