= Mat Noh =

Singaporean footballer (died 2021)

Personal information
- Full name: Mohamed Noh Hussein
- Date of birth: 1953 or 1954
- Place of birth: Singapore
- Date of death: 20 September 2021 (aged 67)
- Place of death: Singapore
- Position: Forward

Senior career*
Years	Team	Apps	(Gls)
- Singapore Lions
- Toa Payoh United

International career
- Singapore
- * Club domestic league appearances and goals

Mohamed "Mat" Noh Hussein (1953/1954 – 20 September 2021) was a Singaporean footballer who played as a forward. He represented the Singapore national team, winning the Malaysia Cup in 1977 and being runner-up in 1981.

== Career ==
Noh played for Toa Payoh United, in Singapore's National Football League from the mid-1970s to the mid-1980s, and later was a coach at the club.

In 1977, Noh scored the winning goal, a penalty, against Malaysia in a 1978 FIFA World Cup qualification match held in Singapore.

== Personal life ==
He married singer Rahimah Rahim in 1977, with whom he had one daughter. They divorced in 1988.

== Death ==
On 20 September 2021, Mat Noh died after having suffered a heart attack the previous day.
