= 1997 Singapore League Cup =

Tournament details
- Country: Singapore
- Dates: July – September 1997
- Teams: 16

Final positions
- Champions: SAFFC
- Runners-up: Geylang United

The 1997 edition of the Singapore League Cup was a football tournament involving the teams in the S.League. It was renamed the Singapore Cup in 1998. The Singapore League Cup launched in 2007 is a different competition.

This first edition of the competition would feature nine teams drawn into three groups of three teams, playing on a home and away basis. The group winners and best runner-up would qualify for the semi-finals.

SAFFC would win the championship defeating Geylang United 1:0 in the final.

== Teams ==
- Balestier Central
- Geylang United
- Home United
- Jurong
- Sembawang Rangers
- Singapore Armed Forces FC (SAFFC)
- Tampines Rovers
- Tiong Bahru United
- Woodlands Wellington

== Group stage ==
=== Group 1 ===
Team	Pld	W	D	L	GF	GA	GD	Pts
SAFFC	4	4	0	0	8	4	+4	12
Balestier Central	4	1	0	3	9	10	−1	3
Home United	4	1	0	3	8	11	−3	0

[26 Jul]
Balestier Central 3–1 Home United
[30 Jul]
Home United 1–2 Singapore Armed Forces
[2 Aug]
Singapore Armed Forces 1–0 Balestier Central
[6 Aug]
Home United 5–4 Balestier Central
[10 Aug]
Singapore Armed Forces 2–1 Home United
[13 Aug]
Balestier Central 2–3 Singapore Armed Forces

=== Group 2 ===
Team	Pld	W	D	L	GF	GA	GD	Pts
Geylang United	4	3	1	0	8	2	+6	10
Woodlands Wellington	4	1	1	2	4	7	−3	4
Jurong	4	1	0	3	6	9	−3	3

[26 Jul]
Jurong 3–1 Woodlands Wellington
[30 Jul]
Geylang United 2–1 Jurong
[2 Aug]
Woodlands Wellington 0–0 Geylang United
[6 Aug]
Woodlands Wellington 3–1 Jurong
[10 Aug]
Jurong 1–3 Geylang United
[13 Aug]
Geylang United 3–0 Woodlands Wellington

=== Group 3 ===
Team	Pld	W	D	L	GF	GA	GD	Pts
Tampines Rovers	4	3	0	1	9	4	+5	9
Tiong Bahru United	4	2	1	1	6	3	+3	7
Sembawang Rangers	4	0	1	3	1	9	−8	1

[Jul 26]
Tiong Bahru United 3–1 Tampines Rovers
[Jul 30]
Tampines Rovers 3–1 Sembawang Rangers
[Aug 2]
Sembawang Rangers 0–3 Tiong Bahru United
[Aug 6]
Tampines Rovers 2–0 Tiong Bahru United
[Aug 10]
Sembawang Rangers 0–3 Tampines Rovers
[Aug 13]
Tiong Bahru United 0–0 Sembawang Rangers

== Semi-finals ==
=== First leg ===
16 August 1997
19:45

SAFFC	1 – 0	Tampines Rovers

17 August 1997
19:45

Tiong Bahru United	3 – 1	Geylang United

=== Second leg ===
19 August 1997
19:45

Tampines Rovers	1 – 1	SAFFC

20 August 1997
19:45

Geylang United	3 – 1	Tiong Bahru United
Penalties
	3 – 2

== Final ==
6 September 1997
19:45

SAFFC	1 – 0	Geylang United
Mioc 78'
