= 1895 Singapore Amateur Football Association Challenge Cup =

1895 Singapore Amateur Football Association Challenge Cup was the fourth season of the Amateur Challenge Cup, the predecessor of the Singapore Cup.

The Final was played between Royal Artillery and 5th Northumberland Fusiliers I, the former winning 3–1 to win the cup.

== Round 1 ==
Home team	Score	Away team
Singapore Cricket Club	3–1	5th Northumberland Fusiliers II

== Round 2 ==
Home team	Score	Away team
Singapore Cricket Club	1–2	Royal Engineers

== Semi-final ==
Home team	Score	Away team
Royal Artillery	0–8	Royal Engineers

== Final ==
Royal Artillery	3–1	5th Northumb. Fusiliers I
