= Mini football =

Mini football may refer to:

- Five-a-side football, or 6x6, 7x7, 8x8 variations (often with informal rules)
- Futsal, a 5x5 ball sport played on a hard court, run by Fédération Internationale de Football Association (FIFA) and Asociación Mundial de Futsal (AMF)
- Indoor soccer (arena soccer), played in a walled arena, such as an ice-hockey rink
- Jorkyball, 2x2 format of football played in a plexiglass cage of 50 sq mt. The walls can be used to pass and score.
- Mini-football (Dutch: minivoetbal), a five-a-side indoor football game without goalkeeper, played in Flanders
- Mini-futbol (Russian: мини-футбол), alternate name (mainly in Russian) for futsal
- Minifootball, a 6x6 small-sided football, or 5x5, 7x7 or 8x8 variations, run by World Minifootball Federation. WMF replaced Federación Internacional de Fútbol Rápido (FIFRA)
- Socca, a 6x6 small-sided football, or 7x7 and 8x8 variations, run by International Socca Federation
- Table football, table-top game that is loosely based on football
