= 1893 Singapore Amateur Football Association Challenge Cup =

1893 Singapore Amateur Football Association Challenge Cup was the second season of the Amateur Challenge Cup, the predecessor of the Singapore Cup.

The defending holders, Singapore Engineers were beaten 1–0 in the first round by Singapore Cricket Club., the latter making it to the finals, where they were beaten by the Royal Engineers by the same result.

== Round 1 ==
Home team	Score	Away team
Singapore Cricket Club	1–0	Singapore Engineers
Royal Engineers	5–1	10th Lincolnshire Regiment II

== Semi-final ==
Home team	Score	Away team
Royal Artillery	1–1	Royal Engineers
10th Lincolnshire Regiment I	1–2	Singapore Cricket Club

=== Replay ===
Home team	Score	Away team
Royal Engineers	2–2	Royal Artillery

=== Second Replay ===
Home team	Score	Away team
Royal Artillery	1–2	Royal Engineers

== Final ==
22 September 1893

Royal Engineers	1–0	Singapore Cricket Club
