= Darwin Cubs FC =

Darwin Cubs
- Full name: Darwin Cubs Football Club
- Nickname: Cubs
- Founded: 1994
- Dissolved: 1995
- Ground: Marrara Oval
- Capacity: 14,000
- President: (Australia) Nicholas Mitaros
- Manager: (Australia) Malcom Bryant
- League: Singapore Premier League
- 1994: 2nd

Darwin Cubs was a football club based in Darwin, Northern Territory, Australia. The club took part in the FAS Premier League from 1994 to 1995. It left the league in the second half of the 1995 season due to disagreements with Football Association of Singapore (FAS).

== History ==
The Cubs played as a foreign team in the FAS Premier League in 1994. The club had to pay for all expenses for Singaporean teams who travelled to Darwin for matches and also pay their own expenses for the club to travel to Singapore.

The Cubs' nickname was derived from the club's sponsorship with Carlton & United Breweries, whose mascot at the time was a cub (due to the initials of the brand). When the Darwin side was provided with a number of shirts featuring a cub mascot, the nickname was born and the team decided to keep it.

The Cubs played their first match in the Premier League against Jurong Town Football Club which they won 4–0. They ended the 1994 season as runners-up to another Australian team, Perth Kangaroos IFC. The Cubs lost just three games for the season, two of those to the Kangaroos.

In 1995, the club failed to secure air tickets for Geylang International FC, Tampines Rovers FC and Balestier United. After the third incident, the club was warned by FAS that further incidents would lead to postponed matches to be forfeited to the opponent teams.

The Cubs subsequently withdrew from the league due to concerns over further investments for the club, eligibility of a Cubs player, refusal of FAS to let Cubs' referees to officiate Cubs' matches and excluding the club from discussion over the formation of S.League.

Some of the team's higher-profile players included Luis Rodriguez, Peter Politis, Manuel Lolias, Barbero, Hamilton Thorpe, Jason Petkovic, Cyrille Ndongo-Keller and Carlo Talladira, all of whom moved to or returned to Australian National Soccer League clubs after the demise of the Cubs.

== Sponsors ==
The Cubs had 10 sponsors which the club signed three years contracts with them.

== Players ==
=== First-team squad ===
Note: Flags indicate national team as defined under FIFA eligibility rules; some limited exceptions apply. Players may hold more than one non-FIFA nationality.

No.	Pos.	Nation	Player
—	GK		Christakos Archie
—	GK		Kathopoulis Charlie
—	DF		Kosmidis Michael
—	DF		Clark Sean
—	DF		Mavros Tommy
—	DF		Makrylos Mikes
—	DF		Hartley Damien Lee
—	DF		Van Lierop Joseph Clement
—	DF		Marros Basillis
—	MF		Greig Jerry
—	MF		Lilias Manual

== Management and staff ==
=== Management ===
Position	Name
President	Nicholas Mitaros

=== Technical staff ===
Position	Name
Manager	Malcom Bryant
Coach	Frank Falzon

== See also ==
- Sport in the Northern Territory
