= Admiralty Rangers FC =

Football club in Singapore

- Full name: Admiralty Rangers Football Club
- Founded: 2018
- League: Singapore Island Wide League

Admiralty Rangers Football Club is a Singaporean football club based in Admiralty, Singapore. The official team was formed in 2018 to take part in the Island Wide League in order to bring the club to a higher level in Singapore football. The club made its debuting season in the FAS Island Wide League 2018.

The club subsequently changed its name to Woodlands Rangers Football Club, and currently still play in the Island Wide League, reaching the knock-out stage in 2026.
