= Siglap FC =

Singaporean association football club

Mattar Sailors FC
- Full name: Mattar Sailors Football Club
- League: Island Wide League

Siglap Football Club is an association football club based in Siglap, Singapore. The club was registered with the Registry of Societies in 2017. Prior to registration, it operated as Siglap Constituency Sports Club.

The club has twice reached the finals of the Singapore FA Cup, losing 0-2 to Balestier Khalsa's Prime League team in 2012, and 1-3 to Home United's Prime League team in 2016.

The club subsequently changed its name to Mattar Sailors FC.
