= Singapore football league system =

Soccer organizational structure in the Southeast Asian country

The Singapore football league system consists of domestic association football leagues in Singapore, organised primarily by the Football Association of Singapore (FAS).

The top tier is the Singapore Premier League (SPL), formerly known as the S.League, introduced in 1996 to replace the semi-professional FAS Premier League. It is the first professional football tournament in Singapore.

The Singapore Football League (SFL), first formed in 1975 as the National Football League, constitute the second and third tiers. The Island Wide League (IWL), is the fourth tier.

The Singapore Premier League 2 (SPL2) is the reserve league for SPL clubs. Between 1997 and 2018, reserve and youth players of the top flight clubs played in the Prime League.

The SPL, SFL, IWL and SPL2 are all organised by the FAS.

Outside the FAS leagues, the most competitive are the high level amateur tournaments known as the Cosmopolitan Football League, or the Cosmoleague, and the Equatorial Football League, locally known as the EFL. These leagues consist of mainly expat players and its members are known to have beaten the SFL and IWL clubs in pre-season friendlies. However, clubs from these leagues do not gain entry to SFL or IWL as the leagues are not organised by the FAS.

For the 2026-27 season, the CosmoLeague has been incorporated into the Equatorial Football League.

The Women's Premier League (WPL), the top-flight for women's football league in Singapore, was formed by the FAS in 2000. Below the WPL is the Women's National League.

On 6 February 2024, the Singapore Youth League (SYL) was officially launched.

== History ==
The FAS (then known as the Singapore Football Association) commenced a league tournament in 1904. With the exception of 1906 and the interruption of World War I, the league was played every year until the fall of Singapore to Japan in 1942, during World War II. The league resumed after the war, in 1947.

An inter-business competition, first started in 1927, was renamed the Singapore Business Houses Football League (SBHFL) in 1937.

In 1974, the FAS League had 118 teams playing in a three-tier hierarchy. For many years, levels two and three comprised of several groups each, with teams at the top of the groups going through to a knock-out stage. The number of groups in the second and third tiers varied from year to year.

In 1975, the FAS introduced the National Football League (NFL), with 10 top teams in Division 1, and a further 20 teams split between Divisions 2 and 3.

In the 1980s, with the top Singaporean players playing for the Singapore FA or other teams in the Malaysian Semi-Pro Football League and the Malaysia Cup, interest in the domestic league in Singapore dwindled. In an attempt to invigorate the domestic league, the FAS formed the semi-professional FAS Premier League in 1988. The NFL continued as an amateur league below the FAS Premier League. In 1994, two Australian teams played in the FAS Premier League.

After the FAS Premier League was formed in 1988 as the top level of Singapore league football above the NFL, SBHFL teams were not keen on or declined promotion to the FAS Premier League.

In the years following the formation of the NFL in 1975, and the FAS Premier League in 1988, the SBHFL lost much of its previous lustre. A rule change in 1994 preventing players from playing for different teams in different leagues over the same period of time also led to the further decline of the SBHFL.

In 1996, after the FAS withdrew the Singapore FA from the Malaysia Cup in 1995, the FAS formed the fully professional S. League to replace the FAS Premier League. Invited foreign teams became a regular feature of the S. League.

In 2018, the S. League was rebranded as the Singapore Premier League. For the 2026-27 season, the remaining team in the SPL with foreign roots, Albirex Niigata Singapore, became localised as FC Jurong.

The Women's Premier League (WPL), the top-flight for women's football league in Singapore, was formed by the FAS in 2000.

As the leagues organised by the FAS over the years have had as one of their objectives the raising of the standard of football in Singapore, and of the Singapore national team, there have been restrictions on the number of foreign players any club can register or field.

The Cosmopolitan Football League (commonly known as the Cosmo League) was formed in 1975 (the same year that the FAS inaugurated the NFL), to cater for Singapore's growing expat population.

== Current system ==
=== FAS Leagues ===
==== Men's leagues ====
Level	League(s)/division(s)
Professional Leagues
1	Singapore Premier League; SPL formerly S.League no relegation Singapore Premier League 2 (Reserve League); SPL2 no relegation
Football Association of Singapore (FAS) Leagues
2	Singapore Football League Division 1 SFL Division 1; 8 or 9 clubs no promotion ↓ relegate 2
3	Singapore Football League Division 2 SFL Division 2; 10 clubs ↑ promote 2 ↓ relegate 2
4	Singapore Island Wide League; IWL; 20 or 21 clubs ↑ promote 2 no relegation

==== Women's leagues ====
Tier	Women football leagues
1	Women's Premier League WPL 6 clubs
2	Women's National League WNL 10 clubs

=== Other leagues ===
Level	League(s)/division(s)
Non-FAS Affiliate Leagues (mostly for expatriates)
≈4	Equatorial Football League Cosmo; EFL Cosmo no promotion no relegation
≈5	Equatorial Football League Premiership; EFL Premiership Division; 12 clubs no promotion ↓ relegate 2
≈6	Equatorial Football League Championship; EFL Championship Division formerly EFL Division 1 formerly EFL Sunday League; 12 clubs ↑ promote 2 ↓ relegate 2
≈7	Equatorial Football League One; EFL League One; 12 clubs ↑ promote 2 no relegation
≈5	United Asian Football League; UAFL no promotion no relegation
≈6	Amateur Football Association Community League; AFA Community League no promotion no relegation

Level	League(s)/division(s)	
≈5	X.League Division 1	Singapore Government Services Football League Division 1
≈6	X.League Division 2	Singapore Government Services Football League Division 2
≈7	X.League Division 3	Singapore Government Services Football League Division 3
Public Sector Developmental Leagues
≈8	SportCares Hearts Football League Division 1	
≈9	SportCares Hearts Football League Division 2	

=== Youth leagues ===
- JSSL Singapore National Youth Leagues (non-FAS)
- Singapore Youth League (FAS)

== Former leagues ==
Tier	Name	Years
1	SFA League	1904 to 1928
1	Singapore Business Houses Football League Division 1	1927 to 1999
1	SAFA League Division 1	1929 to 1965
1	FAS League Division 1	1966 to 1974
1	National Football League Division 1	1975 to 1987
1	FAS Premier League	1988 to 1995
≈3–4 (previously ≈2)	Cosmopolitan Football League (defunct); Cosmoleague; 10 clubs no promotion no relegation	1975 to ?
premier amateur	ESPZEN Sunday League	2004 to ?
amateur	ESPZEN Saturday League	2004? to ?
amateur	ESPZEN Midweek League	2004? to ?
amateur	Goal Arena League	?
amateur	GA Saturday League	?
amateur	GA Sunday League	?
amateur	MOF League	?
youth	PAG Youth League	?

== Past structure ==
1996 to 2018

Tier	Singapore National Leagues
1	S.League
2	FAS National Football League Division 1
3	FAS National Football League Division 2
4	FAS National Football League Division 3
5	Island Wide League

Tier	Reserve and Youth Football Leagues
1	Prime League
2.1	Centre of Excellence U19 Developmental League
2.2	Centre of Excellence U16 Developmental League Tier 1
2.3	Centre of Excellence U16 Developmental League Tier 2

== See also ==
- Singapore Cup
- Singapore FA Cup
- Singapore Community Shield
- List of Singapore's football leagues winners
- Football in Singapore
