= FAS Premier League =

Football league in Singapore between 1988 and 1995

- Organising body: Football Association of Singapore
- Founded: 1988; 38 years ago
- Folded: 1995
- Country: Singapore
- Level on pyramid: 1
- Last champions: Geylang International
- Most championships: Geylang International (7 titles)

The Football Association of Singapore Premier League was a semi-professional football league competition held in Singapore between 1988 and 1995. The Premier League succeeded the National Football League Division One as the top tier of the Singapore football league structure. It was replaced by the S.League in 1996.

== Background ==
The amateur National Football League Division One had been the top level of domestic football in Singapore since 1975.

The Football Association of Singapore (FAS) had entered a representative team (Singapore FA, nicknamed the "Lions") in the Malaysia Cup up to 1981.. Singapore was excluded from the newly formed Malaysian League from 1982 to 1984 (and thus from the Malaysia Cup, with qualification limited to the top 8 in the Malaysian League), but joined between 1985 and 1988.

With the top Singaporean players playing exclusively for the Singapore FA or other teams in the Malaysian League and Cup during this time, interest in the domestic league in Singapore dwindled. In an attempt to invigorate the domestic league, the FAS formed the semi-professional FAS Premier League in 1988.

Eight clubs - Hwee Seng SC, Jurong Town FC, Changi CSC, Singapore Armed Forces Sports Association, Tampines Rovers, Tiong Bahru CSC, Balestier United RC and Geylang International - were selected to contest the inaugural season in 1988. Police SA was later added to make nine clubs. Hwee Seng SC withdrew in October 1987. The league commenced in 1988 with the remaining eight clubs.

When the FAS decided to proceed with the new league in 1987, twelve clubs had applied to join the inaugural FAS Premier League. Ten clubs were from the National Football League, one club (Hwee Seng SC) from the Singapore Business Houses Football League (SBHFL), and one re-formed club (Telok Kurau United). The two NFL clubs that were unsuccessful were Tyrwhitt Soccerites and Kaki Bukit SC.

== Active years ==
The dominant team in the FAS Premier League was Geylang International, which won the league six consecutive times from 1988-1993.

In 1989, Tyrwhitt Soccerites joined the Premier League. In 1993, the start of the league was postponed from January to June.

In 1994, in a bid to add some spice to the Premier League and generate increased fan interest, two teams from Australia were invited to participate – the Perth Kangaroos and the Darwin Cubs. However, after confirming the participation of the two Australian clubs, the FAS then decided to withdraw all the players in its Malaysian League team from participating in the local league that year. This considerably weakened the strength of the local clubs. Perth Kangaroos won the Premier League that year without losing a game, and the Darwin Cubs finished second. The experiment did not succeed in bolstering fan interest. Halfway through the season, Perth Kangaroos' management company, Global Football Australia, declared bankrupt and handed over control of the team to the Soccer Association of Western Australia. As a result, Perth Kangaroos was disbanded after the end of the 1994 season.

In 1995, the FAS unexpectedly decided to withdraw the Singapore team from the Malaysian league (at that time, the professional Premier League, which had replaced the Semi-Pro League in 1994, which in turn had replaced the Malaysian League in 1989). Most of the players on the Singapore national football team had been due to play for Singapore FA in the Malaysian league. It was therefore decided that the Singapore FA should play in the 1995 Premier League competition as a stop-gap measure until the establishment of the S.League the following year. The national team is restricted to the first 16 players on the team, no foreign signings and not entitled to the league's prize if they won the league. Tickets are not charged for all matches except for the national team's matches held at the National Stadium.

The initial matches of the Lions drew lots of fans, with thousands of fans attending its matches but interest waned after the Lions beat all the clubs one-sidedly. In August, Darwin Cubs pulled out of the league due to financial problems. The season ended with the Lions on top of the league but the winner of the league was Geylang International who was placed second as the Lions was not eligible as the winner.

The Premier League was disbanded with the formation of the professional S.League in 1996.

== Clubs ==
Team	Founded	Based	Stadium	Capacity
Geylang International	1974			
Tiong Bahru Constituency Sports Club	1974			
Singapore Armed Forces Sports Association	1975			
Darwin Cubs	1994		Marrara Oval	14,000
Gibraltar Crescent				
Police Sports Association	1945			
Tampines Rovers				
Balestier United Recreational Club	1898			
Singapore Lions				
Jurong Town Football Club	1975			
Tyrwhitt Soccerites	1985			

== Premier League champions ==
Season	Champions
1988	Geylang International
1989	Geylang International (2)
1990	Geylang International (3)
1991	Geylang International (4)
1992	Geylang International (5)
1993	Geylang International (6)
1994	(Australia) Perth Kangaroos
1995	Geylang International (7) (Note: The Singapore Lions was top of the league but was not eligible to be the winner due to the competition rules. Geylang International placed second in the league became the winner.)

Invited club

== See also ==
- Football in Singapore
- Singapore Football League
- Singapore Premier League
- Football Association of Singapore
- Singapore football league system
