= 2009 Singapore Cup =

Tournament details
- Country: Singapore
- Dates: April 2009 - November 2009
- Teams: 16

Final positions
- Champions: Geylang United
- Runners-up: (Thailand) Bangkok Glass

The Singapore Cup 2009 (known as the RHB Singapore Cup due to its main sponsor) started on 27 April 2009. It was the 12th staging of the annual Singapore Cup tournament.

12 S.League clubs and 4 invited foreign teams from Thailand (2 teams), Cambodia (1) and Indonesia (1) played in this edition. The cup was a single-elimination tournament, with all sixteen teams playing from the first round. The first round involved one-off matches. Subsequent rounds involved ties of two legs.

The final was played on 8 November and won by Geylang United, who beat Bangkok Glass 1–0.

The cup winner were guaranteed a place in the 2010 AFC Cup.

== Teams ==
- (Japan) Albirex Niigata (S)
- Balestier Khalsa
- (Thailand) Bangkok Glass
- Brunei DPMM
- Geylang United
- Gombak United
- Home United
- (Indonesia) Pelita Jaya
- (Cambodia) Phnom Penh Crown
- Sengkang Punggol
- Singapore Armed Forces FC (SAFFC)
- (South Korea) Super Reds
- Tampines Rovers
- (Thailand) TTM Samut Sakhon
- Woodlands Wellington
- Young Lions (FAS under-23 team)

== Knockout stage ==
The draw for the tournament was held on 15 April 2009

=== Bracket ===
Round of 16
Tampines Rovers	1
Sengkang Punggol	0
(Japan) Albirex Niigata (S)	3
Gombak United	1
Geylang United	2
SAFFC	1
Balestier Khalsa	0
Home United	3
(Thailand) TTM Samut Sakhon	4
(South Korea) Super Reds	2
(Brunei) DPMM FC	1
(Indonesia) Pelita Jaya	0
(Cambodia) Phnom Penh Crown	2
Young Lions	0
Woodlands Wellington	0
(Thailand) Bangkok Glass	1

Quarter-finals
Tampines Rovers	1	0	1 (1)
(Japan) Albirex Niigata (S)	0	1	1 (3)
Geylang United	2	2	4
Home United	1	2	3
(Thailand) TTM Samut Sakhon	3	4	7
(Brunei) DPMM FC	1	2	3
(Cambodia) Phnom Penh Crown	1	3	4
(Thailand) Bangkok Glass	2	3	5

Semi-finals
(Japan) Albirex Niigata (S)	0	1	1 (3)
Geylang United	1	0	1 (4)
(Thailand) TTM Samut Sakhon	0	4	4
(Thailand) Bangkok Glass	6	3	9

Final
Geylang United	1
(Thailand) Bangkok Glass	0

== Preliminary round ==
April 28, 2009
19:45

Woodlands Wellington	0 – 1	(Thailand) Bangkok Glass
	Details; Report	Tanat Wongsuparak 25'

Woodlands Stadium
Attendance: 1,344
Referee: Abas Daud

April 29, 2009
19:45

(Brunei) DPMM FC	1 – 0	(Indonesia) Pelita Jaya
Abdelhamid Berguiga 76'	Details; Report

Jalan Besar Stadium
Attendance: 2,052
Referee: T Aravinthan

April 30, 2009
19:45

Balestier Khalsa	0 – 3	Home United
Sofiyan Abdul Hamid (red card) 90'	Details; Report	Norikazu Murakami 10'; Shahril Ishak 15'; Kengne Ludovick 38'

Toa Payoh Stadium
Attendance: 1,835
Referee: Sukhbir Singh

May 1, 2009
19:30

Geylang United	2 – 1	SAFFC
Yasir Hanapi 29'; Syed Thaha 62'	Details; Report	Therdsak Chaiman 90'

Bedok Stadium
Attendance: 2,048
Referee: P Pandian

May 2, 2009
19:45

(Japan) Albirex Niigata (S)	3 – 1	Gombak United
Kenji Adachihara 54'; Keisuke Ogawa 70' (pen.); Akira Takase 90'	Details; Report	Bah Mamadou 83'; Jaslee Hatta (red card) 40'

Jurong East Stadium
Attendance: 1,546
Referee: Muhammad Adzhar Aziz

May 3, 2009
19:45

Tampines Rovers	1 – 0	Sengkang Punggol
Mustafic Fahrudin 36'	Details; Report

Tampines Stadium
Attendance: 1,406
Referee: Abdul Malik

May 4, 2009
19:45

(Cambodia) Phnom Penh Crown	2 – 0	(Singapore) Young Lions FC
Jean Lappe Lappe 25' 60'	Details; Report

Jurong West Stadium
Attendance: 2,420
Referee: Mohammad Taqi A Jahari

May 6, 2009
19:45

(Thailand) TTM Samut Sakhon	4 – 2	(South Korea) Super Reds
Paul Bekombo 7' 84'; Narong Jansawek 53'; Aly Camara 90'	Details; Report	Yun Bo-Young 51' (pen.); Park Han Seok 78'

Tampines Stadium
Attendance: 1,054
Referee: Abas Daud

== Quarter-finals ==
=== First leg ===
August 26, 2009
19:45

(Cambodia) Phnom Penh Crown	1 – 2	(Thailand) Bangkok Glass
Chan Chaya 8'	Details; Report	Chatree Chimtalay 39'; Metee Pungpoh 53'

Jalan Besar Stadium
Attendance: 1,095
Referee: P Pandian

August 28, 2009
19:30

(Brunei) DPMM FC	1 – 3	(Thailand) TTM Samut Sakhon
Abu Bakar Mahari 76'	Details; Report	Paul Bekombo 16' 61'; Aly Camara 89'

Jalan Besar Stadium
Attendance: 1,506
Referee: Abas Daud

August 30, 2009
19:45

Geylang United	2 – 1	Home United
Noor Ali 48'; Baihakki Khaizan 65' (pen.)	Details; Report	Valery Hiek 23' (red card) 64'

Bedok Stadium
Attendance: 899
Referee: T Aravinthan

September 1, 2009
19:45

Tampines Rovers	1 – 0	(Japan) Albirex Niigata (S)
Sutee Suksomkit 13'	Details; Report

Tampines Stadium
Attendance: 2,453
Referee: Leow Thiam Hoe

=== Second leg ===
August 31, 2009
19:45

(Thailand) TTM Samut Sakhon	4 – 2	(Brunei) DPMM FC
Aly Camara 1'; Pradit Taweechai 26'; Tanongsak Promdard 83'; Saksit Wuttipadadorn 89'	Details; Report	Abdelhamid Berguiga 88'; Ivan Jerkovic 90'

Jurong West Stadium
Attendance: 912
Referee: Abdul Malik

TTM Samut Sakhon won 7 – 3 on aggregate.

September 2, 2009
19:45

(Thailand) Bangkok Glass	3 – 3	(Cambodia) Phnom Penh Crown
Nelson San Martín 13'; Nantawat Tansopa 16'; Surachet Ngamtip 37'	Details; Report	Chan Rithy 20' (pen.); Keo Sokngon 32'; Marcel Modibo 55'

Jalan Besar Stadium
Attendance: 816
Referee: Sukhbir Singh

Bangkok Glass won 5 – 4 on aggregate.

September 3, 2009
19:45

Home United	2 – 2	Geylang United
Tengku Mushadad 45'; Peres De Oliveira 89' (pen.)	Details; Report	Miroslav Latiak 11'; Masrezwan Masturi 84'

Clementi Stadium
Attendance: 929
Referee: Muhd Taqi

Geylang United won 4 – 3 on aggregate.

September 4, 2009
19:30

(Japan) Albirex Niigata (S)	1 – 0	Tampines Rovers
Kenji Adachihara 90'	Details; Report	Benoit Croissant (red card) 85'
Penalties
Kenji Adachihara (penalty missed); Ken Matsumoto (penalty scored); Ryohei Maeda (penalty scored); Kazuki Yoshino (penalty scored)	3 – 1	(penalty missed) Sutee Suksomkit; (penalty scored) Mustafic Fahrudin; (penalty missed) Zulkarnaen Zainal; (penalty missed) Fathi Yunus

Jurong West Stadium
Attendance: 1,427
Referee: Adzhar Adziz

Albirex Niigata (S) 1 – 1 Tampines Rovers on aggregate. Albirex Niigata (S) won 3 – 1 on penalties.

== Semifinals ==
=== First leg ===
October 5, 2009
19:45

(Japan) Albirex Niigata (S)	0 – 1	Geylang United
Tetsuya Kishida (yellow card) 73' (yellow-red card) 87'	Details; Report	Kim Jae-Hong 61'

Jurong East Stadium
Attendance: 1,526
Referee: Abdul Malik

October 26, 2009
19:45

(Thailand) TTM Samut Sakhon	0 – 6	(Thailand) Bangkok Glass
	Details; Report	Ajayi Samuel 1' 11' 72'; Sarun Promkaew 5'; Tanat Wongsuparak 34'; Rungroj Sawangsri 52' (pen.)

Jurong West Stadium
Attendance: 800
Referee: Abas Daud

=== Second leg ===
October 9, 2009
19:30

Geylang United	0 – 1	(Japan) Albirex Niigata (S)
	Details; Report	Taisuke Akiyoshi 42'
Penalties
Kim Jae-Hong (penalty scored); Faizal Senin (penalty scored); Miroslav Latiak (penalty scored); Walid Lounis (penalty scored)	4 – 3	(penalty scored) Kazuki Yoshino; (penalty missed) Kenji Adachihara; (penalty scored) Taisuke Akiyoshi; (penalty scored) Akira Takase; (penalty missed) Yoshitaka Komori

Bedok Stadium
Attendance: 1,496
Referee: Leow Thiam Hoe

Geylang United 1 – 1 Albirex Niigata (S) on aggregate. Geylang United won 4-3 on penalties.

October 29, 2009
19:45

(Thailand) Bangkok Glass	3 – 4	(Thailand) TTM Samut Sakhon
Chatree Chimtalay 6' 86'; Peeratat Phoruendee 71' (o.g.); Wachira Sangsri (red card) 90'	Details; Report	Supphakorn Ramkulabsuk 8'; Paul Bekombo 20' (pen.) 62'; Worawut Wangsawad 90' (pen.); Camara Aly (yellow card) 75' (yellow-red card) 75'

Jalan Besar Stadium
Attendance: 1,187
Referee: Sukhbir Singh

Bangkok Glass won 9 – 4 on aggregate.

== Third Place Playoff ==
November 7, 2009
19:45

(Japan) Albirex Niigata (S)	1 – 1	(Thailand) TTM Samut Sakhon
Kunihiro Honda 89'	Details; Report	Tanongsak Promdard 20'
Penalties
Kazuki Yoshino (penalty missed); Ken Matsumoto (penalty scored); Ryohei Maeda (penalty scored); Kunihiro Honda (penalty scored); Akira Takase (penalty missed)	3 – 4	(penalty scored) Worawut Wangsawad; (penalty scored) Tana Sripandorn; (penalty scored) Tanongsak Prajakkata; (penalty scored) Narong Jansawek; (penalty missed) Paul Bekombo

Jalan Besar Stadium
Attendance: Muhd Taqi
Referee: 2,091

== Final ==
November 8, 2009
19:30

Geylang United	1 – 0	(Thailand) Bangkok Glass
Hafiz Rahim 82'	Details; Report

Jalan Besar Stadium
Attendance: 5,870
Referee: Kenny Ng

Geylang United	Bangkok Glass

GK	19	(Singapore) Yazid Yasin	(yellow card) 90'
DF	5	(Singapore) Walid Lounis
DF	11	(Singapore) Syed Thaha
DF	12	(Singapore) Adrian Dhanaraj		(substituted off) 79'
DF	13	(Singapore) Jonathan Xu
MF	3	(Slovakia) Rastislav Belicak
MF	10	(South Korea) Kim Jae-Hong	(yellow card) 84'
MF	15	(Singapore) Shah Hirul	(yellow card) 72'
MF	20	(Singapore) Mohd Noor Ali
FW	7	(Singapore) Masrezwan Masturi		(substituted off) 72'
FW	9	(Slovakia) Miroslav Latiak
Substitutes:
GK	1	(Singapore) Fajar Sarib
DF	2	(Singapore) Faizal Senin
MF	8	(Japan) Haruki Seto
MF	41	(Singapore) Ang Zhi Wei
MF	47	(Singapore) Yasir Hanapi
MF	17	(Singapore) Hafiz Rahim	(yellow card) 82'	(substituted on) 72'
FW	46	(Singapore) Masmashzreen Masturi		(substituted on) 79'
Coach:
(Singapore) Mike Wong

GK	1	(Thailand) Naratip Phanprom
DF	2	(Thailand) Polawat Wangkahart	(yellow card) 44'	(substituted off) 84'
DF	6	(Thailand) Amnaj Kaewkiew (c)
DF	8	(Thailand) Rungroj Sawangsri
DF	17	(Thailand) Supachai Komsilp
MF	7	(Thailand) Anon Boonsukco	(yellow card) 89'
MF	11	(Thailand) Sarun Promkaew		(substituted off) 57'
MF	15	(Thailand) Anawin Jujeen
MF	16	(Thailand) Tanat Wongsuparak
MF	23	(Thailand) Peerapong Pichitchotirat	(yellow card) 48'
FW	9	(Nigeria) Ajayi Samuel
Substitutes:
GK	18	(Thailand) Kritsana Klanklin
DF	3	(Thailand) Decha Phetakua
MF	5	(Thailand) Kraikiat Beadtaku
MF	21	(Thailand) Supachai Phupa
MF	24	(Thailand) Wannapol Puspakom
FW	19	(Thailand) Nantawat Tansopa	(red card) 90'	(substituted on) 84'
FW	29	(Thailand) Chatree Chimtalay		(substituted on) 57'
Coach:
(Thailand) Surachai Jaturapattarapong

MATCH OFFICIALS

- Assistant referees:
  - Tang Yew Mun
  - Edwin Lee
- Fourth official: P Pandian

MATCH RULES

- 90 minutes.
- 30 minutes of extra-time if necessary.
- Penalty shoot-out if scores still level.
- Seven named substitutes
- Maximum of 3 substitutions.

== See also ==
- Singapore Cup
- S.League
- Singapore League Cup
- Singapore Charity Shield
- Football Association of Singapore
- List of football clubs in Singapore
