= 2017 Eunos Crescent FC season =

Eunos Crescent
2017 season
- Chairman: Darwin Jalil
- Head coach: Khairul Asyraf
- National Football League: 6th
- Singapore FA Cup: Round 2

The 2017 season saw Eunos Crescent compete in the Singapore National Football League. Founded in 1975, the club has been around for 42 years.

In an interview in 2017, the chairman said that he hopes the club will be able to compete in the S.League as a professional outfit one day.

On 31 May 2017, it was reported that Khairul Asyraf, who was previously to be the Head of Youth Development, has been named as the new head coach for the team, replacing the outgoing Mohd Mardani.

== Squad ==
As of 10 January 2019

No.	Name	Nationality	Position (s)	Date of birth (age)	Previous club
Goalkeepers
1	Azim Syakir	(Malaysia)	GK		(Singapore) National Football Academy
12	Nazri Sabri	(Singapore)	GK	20 September 1989 (age 37)	(Singapore) Hougang United
24	Aliff Asyraaf	(Singapore)	GK		
Defenders
2	Azfar Majed	(Singapore)	DF		(Singapore) Home United U18
4	Fahmi Zailani	(Singapore)	DF		(Singapore) Jungfrau Punggol FC
5	Lau Meng Meng	(Singapore)	DF	29 May 1983 (age 43)	Tiong Bahru FC
11	Jeremy Lam	(Singapore)	DF	10 October 1996 (age 30)	Balestier Khalsa Prime League
17	Hairudin Dahlan	(Singapore)	DF		(Singapore) Home United U18
18	Hans Edzra	(Singapore)	DF		
19	Jayan Varghese	(India)	DF		
20	Khairul Zainudin	(Singapore)	DF		
Midfielders
3	Shaik Razzif	(Singapore)	MF		
6	Nurisham Jupri	(Singapore)	MF		
7	Osman Shainin	(Singapore)	MF		
8	Safwan Ramlan	(Singapore)	MF		(Singapore) Tampines Rovers Prime League
10	Tengku Mushadad	(Singapore)	MF	7 August 1984 (age 42)	Tanjong Pagar United
14	Nazrul Isnin	(Singapore)	MF	22 February 1997 (age 29)	Warriors FC Prime League
16	Robi Satria	(Singapore)	MF		
21	Firdaus Junadi	(Singapore)	MF		
22	Raqib Razak	(Singapore)	MF		
25	Xavier Boey	(Singapore)	MF		Warriors FC Under 17
Forwards
9	Indra Sahdan	(Singapore)	FW	5 March 1979 (age 47)	Geylang International
13	Jonathan Xu	(Singapore)	FW	7 September 1983 (age 43)	Balestier Khalsa
23	Shah Arif	(Singapore)	FW		Yishun Sentek Mariners

== Transfers ==
=== Pre-season ===
==== In ====
Position	Player	Transferred from	Ref
DF	(Singapore) Lau Meng Meng	(Singapore) Tiong Bahru FC	
DF	(Singapore) Indra Hafriefendy	Bishan Barx FC	
MF	(Singapore) Fareez Nazari	Balestier United RC	
MF	(Singapore) Zul Helmi Hamid	Admiralty CSC	
FW	(Singapore) Goh Swee Swee	Tiong Bahru FC	
FW	(Singapore) Indra Sahdan	Geylang International	
FW	(Singapore) Erfan Zakariah	Starlight Soccerites	
FW	(Singapore) Shah Arif	Yishun Sentek Mariners	

==== Out ====
Position	Player	Transferred To	Ref
GK	(Singapore) Nazri Sabri	Later Re-join	
GK	(Singapore) Farhan Amin		
DF	(Singapore) Faliq Sudhir	Yishun Sentek Mariners	
DF	(Singapore) Haziq Sudhir	Yishun Sentek Mariners	
DF	(Singapore) Salihin Shafiee	Yishun Sentek Mariners	
DF	(Singapore) Precious Emuejeraye	Balestier United Recreation Club	
MF	(Singapore) Hafiz Sani	Jungfrau Punggol FC	
MF	(Singapore) Tengku Saiful	Kaki Bukit FC	
MF	(Singapore) Prakash Manikam		
MF	(Singapore) Faiszuan Musa		
MF	(Singapore) Syazni Ramlee	Yishun Sentek Mariners	
MF	(Singapore) Rahim Mahmood	Yishun Sentek Mariners	
FW	(Singapore) Hafiz Ahmad		
FW	(Singapore) Masrezwan Masturi	Balestier United Recreation Club	

=== Mid-season ===
==== In ====
Position	Player	Transferred from	Ref
DF	(Singapore) Jeremy Lam	(Singapore) Balestier Khalsa Prime League	
DF	(Singapore) Nazrul Isnin	(Singapore) Warriors FC Prime League	
DF	(Singapore) Xavier Boey	(Singapore) Warriors FC U17	
DF	(India) Varghese Jayan	(India) Cochin Port FC	
FW	(Singapore) Khairul Zainudin	(Singapore) West J. United Sportcare	
GK	(Singapore) Nazri Sabri	Rejoin	
DF	(Singapore) Azfar Majed	(Singapore) Home United U18	
DF	(Singapore) Syafeeq Haikal	Free agent	

==== Out ====
Position	Player	Transferred To	Ref
DF	(Singapore) Yasser Maideen	Sacked	
DF	(Singapore) Indra Hafriefendy		
MF	(Singapore) Zul Helmi Hamid		
MF	(Singapore) Fareez Nazari	(Singapore) Balestier United RC	
MF	(Singapore) D.Saivinodh		
FW	(Singapore) Erfan Zakariah	(Singapore) Kembangan United FC	
FW	(Singapore) Goh Swee Swee		
DF	(Singapore) Fazli Tajudin		

== Competitions ==
=== NFL ===
League Table

Pos	Team	Pld	W	D	L	GF	GA	GD	Pts	Qualification or relegation
1	Yishun Sentek Mariners (C)	22	20	0	2	85	22	+63	60	
2	SAFSA	22	18	3	1	77	18	+59	57	
3	Balestier United	22	14	2	6	45	28	+17	44	
4	Tiong Bahru FC	22	13	1	8	51	26	+25	40	
5	Siglap FC	22	6	8	8	28	40	−12	26	
6	Eunos Crescent	22	8	2	12	38	60	−22	26	
7	Admiralty FC	22	6	5	11	29	51	−22	23	
8	Police SA	22	5	7	10	42	55	−13	22	
9	GFA Sporting Westlake FC	22	6	4	12	42	59	−17	22	
10	Katong FC	22	5	6	11	25	49	−24	21	
11	Bishan Barx FC	22	6	3	13	28	53	−25	21	Relegation to 2018 NFL Division 2
12	Singapore Cricket Club	22	2	5	15	20	49	−29	11	Relegation to 2018 NFL Division 2

Source: FAS & FB NFL
Rules for classification: 1) points; 2) goal difference; 3) number of goals scored; 4) number of wins
(C) Champions

Fixture and results

Win Draw Loss

24 April 2017 Round 1	Eunos Crescent FC (Singapore)	1-2	(Singapore) GFA Sporting Westlake FC	Jalan Besar Stadium
			Hakim Abdullah; Jumari Senin

14 May 2017 Round 2	Admiralty Football Club (Singapore)	2-1	(Singapore) Eunos Crescent FC	Yishun Stadium
	Irwan Shah Abdul 39'; Aiman Hafiz 70'		Goh Swee Swee 59'

4 June 2017 Round 3	Eunos Crescent FC (Singapore)	4-4	(Singapore) Police Sports Association	Bukit Gombak Stadium
	Goh Swee Swee 36'; Raqib Razak 71'; Miryanto Amir 78' (o.g.); Fahmi Zailani 88'		Syahmi Kadir 22'; Syukri Mis Nam 40' 43'; Taufiq Hidayat 83'	Referee: Chan Kwok Wai

11 June 2017 Round 4	Siglap FC (Singapore)	2-1	(Singapore) Eunos Crescent FC	Bukit Gombak Stadium
	Timothy Tan 16'; Izzudin Abdullah 84'		Hairudin Dahlan 12'

18 June 2017 Round 5	Eunos Crescent FC (Singapore)	1-5	(Singapore) Bishan Barx FC	Yishun Stadium
	Jonathan Xu 75'		Fazli Sulaiman 20'; Azli Mutalib 39'; Arif Rahman 65' (pen.); Danial Faris 87' (pen.) 90'	Referee: Koh Choon Joo

2 July 2017 Round 6	Eunos Crescent FC (Singapore)	1-2	Singapore Cricket Club	Yishun Stadium
	Tengku Mushadad 75'

9 July 2017 Round 7	Balestier United RC (Singapore)	3-1	(Singapore) Eunos Crescent FC	Yishun Stadium
	Ruhaizad Ismail 6'; Zamri Kamal 38'; Haidil Sufian 73'		Lau Meng Meng 50'	Referee: Kwang Yong

16 July 2017 Round 8	Eunos Crescent FC (Singapore)	1-0	(Singapore) Tiong Bahru FC	The Arena
	Jonathan Xu 47'			Referee: Bikash Gurung

30 July 2017 Round 9	Yishun Sentek Mariners FC (Singapore)	7-2	(Singapore) Eunos Crescent FC	Yishun Stadium
	Amirul Walid 29', 47'; Zul Feshal 44', 52'; Nurisham Jupri 67' (o.g.); Na'iim Ishak 83'; Muhaimin Mansor 88'		Safwan Ramlan 9'; Jonathan Xu 43'	Referee: Jordon Goh

13 August 2017 Round 10	Eunos Crescent FC (Singapore)	1-2	(Singapore) Katong FC	The Arena
	Jonathan Xu 59'		Jason Poh 31'; Nicholas Lee 55'	Referee: Wee Boon Koon

20 August 2017 Round 11	SAFSA (Singapore)	2-0	(Singapore) Eunos Crescent FC	Yishun Stadium
	Nur Hizami 85', 88'

10 September 2017 Round 12	Eunos Crescent FC (Singapore)	4-1	(Singapore) Admiralty FC	Jalan Besar Stadium
	Raqib Razak 18'; Jonathan Xu 45', 49'; Osman Shainin 57'		Ashrin Shariff 69'	Referee: Juherman Zaitun

24 September 2017 Round 13	Police SA (Singapore)	2-3	(Singapore) Eunos Crescent FC	Yishun Stadium
	Syahmi Kadir 48'; Ahmad Zulkarnain 90'		Firdaus Junaidi 59', 63'; Tengku Mushadad 70'	Referee: Taufik Thana

1 October 2017 Round 14	Eunos Crescent FC (Singapore)	1-0	(Singapore) Siglap FC	The Arena
	Lau Meng Meng 21'			Referee: Farhad Mohd

15 October 2017 Round 15	Singapore Cricket Club	2-3	(Singapore) Eunos Crescent FC	Yishun Stadium
	K Saseetharan 40'; Justin Khiang 76'		Osman Shainin 15'; Jayan Varghese 62'; Jonathan Xu 90'	Referee: Cui Yan

22 October 2017 Round 16	Eunos Crescent FC (Singapore)	0-2	(Singapore) Balestier United Recreation Club	Jalan Besar Stadium
			Zamri Kamal 59'; Masrezwan Masturi 77'	Referee: Farhad Mohd

25 October 2017 Round 17	Bishan Barx (Singapore)	2-3	(Singapore) Eunos Crescent FC	Jurong West Stadium
	Farisy Danial 13', 67'		Fahmi Zailani 34', 68'; Nurisham Jupri 45'	Referee: Juherman Zaitun

29 October 2017 Round 18	Tiong Bahru Football Club (Singapore)	7-0	(Singapore) Eunos Crescent FC	Yishun Stadium
	Lionel Kong 7'; Jake Mcfarlane 19'; Daigo Hiromoto 44'; Randy Pay 54'; Farouq Farkhan 68', 90', 90'			Referee: Alson Foo

5 November 2017 Round 19	Eunos Crescent FC (Singapore)	1-7	(Singapore) Yishun Sentek Mariners FC	The Arena
	Jonathan Xu 47'		Asnol As'at 5', 17'; Zul Feshal 11', 26', 32', 41'; Sharil Jupri 72'	Referee: Wee Boon Koon

=== FA Cup ===
Win Draw Loss

27 August 2017 Round 1	Eunos Crescent FC (Singapore)	2-2 (5-4 p)	(Singapore) Admiralty CSC	Jalan Besar Stadium
	Jonathan Xu 9' (pen.) 35'		Shaharul Ramadhan 37'; Danish Jefri 42' (pen.)	Referee: Juherman Zaitun

6 September 2017 Round 2	Jungfrau Punggol FC (Singapore)	3-3 (4-2 p)	(Singapore) Eunos Crescent FC	Jalan Besar Stadium
	Rahim Mahmood 49' (pen.); Joey Yap 61'; Hafiz Sani 81'		Osman Shainin 38'; Nurisham Jupri 42'; Hairudin Dahlan 48'	Referee: Daniel Wong
