= Yazid Yasin =

Singaporean footballer

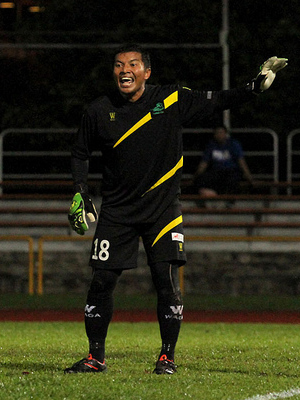
- Yazid Yasin playing for Woodlands Wellington in 2013.

Personal information
- Full name: Mohamed Yazid bin Mohamed Yasin
- Date of birth: 24 June 1979 (age 47)
- Place of birth: Singapore
- Height: 1.69 m (5 ft 6 1/2 in)
- Position: Goalkeeper

Senior career*
Years	Team	Apps	(Gls)
1996–1998	Sembawang Rangers	17	(0)
1999–2000	Home United	52	(0)
2001–2003	Sembawang Rangers	93	(0)
2004–2008	Woodlands Wellington	124	(0)
2009–2012	Geylang United	100	(0)
2013–2014	Woodlands Wellington	39	(0)
2015–2016	Geylang International	26	(0)
2016	Warriors FC	25	(0)
2017–2019	Gymkhana FC	20	(0)
2019	Admiralty CSN	5	(0)
2022	Eunos Crescent FC		
2022-2023	Commonwealth Cosmos FC		
2023-2024	Yishun FC		
2024-2025	Balestier United RC		
2025	Yishun FC		

International career
1996	Singapore U-15		
1999	Singapore	1	(0)
1999	Singapore national futsal team		

Managerial career
- 2020–: Balestier Khalsa (goalkeeper coach)
Medal record
Representing Gymkhana FC
Gold medal – first place	National Football League Division 2	2017
- * Club domestic league appearances and goals as of 8 April 2015

Mohamed Yazid bin Mohamed Yasin is a Singaporean retired footballer who played most of his career in S.League.

He is one of a rare handful of players who had won every single title available in the domestic league, since its inauguration in 1996. He has recorded 450 appearances in the S.League and also Woodlands Wellington al-time highest appearances for the club.

== Club career ==
=== Sembawang Rangers ===
As a youth player, Yazid first came to prominence in the 1995 Lion City Cup where he stood in goal for eventual winners, the Singapore A (Under-16) squad, alongside Indra Sahdan and Ahmad Latiff Khamaruddin.

His level headed performance as a 16-year-old in the competition led to him signing his first professional contract with Sembawang Rangers in the S.League's maiden season in 1996. During his time with the Stallions, he was once famously deployed as a midfielder in a 1996 S.League match against Woodlands Wellington due to an injury crisis in the Sembawang squad.

=== Home United ===
In 1999, he moved to Home United and won the 1999 S.League title with the Protectors in the same year. He was also named as the League Young Player of The Year in 1999. He goes on to win the Singapore Cup the following year.

=== Return to Sembawang Rangers ===
In 2001, Yazid return to his boyhood club, Sembawang Rangers for two seasons.

=== Woodlands Wellington ===
In 2004, Yazid signed for Woodlands Wellington which he make a total of 124 appearances at the club. In 2007, he won the inaugural Singapore League Cup and kept a clean sheet in the entire cup tournament.

=== Geylang United ===
In 2009, Yazid signed for Geylang United which will be his fourth club in the S.League. Yazid's performance during the 2009 Singapore Cup, which included a penalty save late in the game, won him the man of the match award and helped Geylang United to lift the Cup after a hard-fought 1–0 victory over Thai Premier League side Bangkok Glass in the final. The following season, Yazid appeared in the Eagles' 2010 AFC Cup group stage matches against V-League champions, Da Nang, and Hong Kong FA Cup winners, Tai Po FC.

=== Return to Woodlands Wellington ===
On 19 November 2012, it was announced that Yazid had re-joined his former club, Woodlands Wellington ahead of the 2013 S.League season. . He is the player with the most number of appearances for the Rams at 163 appearances ahead of Abdelhadi Laakkad (129 appearances), Goh Tat Chuan (138 appearances) and Sazali Salleh (158 appearances). He made his first reappearance and his 125th overall appearance for Woodlands Wellington on 21 February 2013 in a 2–2 draw against Warriors F.C.

The 34-year-old achieved a milestone on 16 July when he made an incredible 400th S.League appearance in the Rams' 5–2 victory over the Courts Young Lions at the Woodlands Stadium.

=== Geylang International ===
After the merger of Woodlands into Hougang United in 2015, Yazid returned to Geylang to join Geylang International. At 36 years old, Yazid is S.League's oldest active player.

=== Warriors FC ===
In 2016, Yazid joined Warriors FC which is his fifth club in the S.League.

=== Gymkhana FC ===
In 2017, Yazid moved to National Football League Division 2 club, Gymkhana FC where he helped them to win the Division two league titles gaining promotion to Division One.

=== Admiralty CSN ===
In 2019, Yazid joined another National Football League club, Admiralty CSN.

== International career ==
Yazid has one solitary cap for Singapore, which he acquired while playing for the Lions in a friendly match against New Zealand on 29 June 1999.

== Coaching career ==
On 30 January 2020, Yazid joined Balestier Khalsa as their goalkeeping coach.

== Personal life ==
Yazid both sons, Aizil Yazid and Aqil Yazid are professional footballers playing their trades for Young Lions in the Singapore Premier League. Aizil followed continued his Yazid legacy playing as a goalkeeper while Aqil played as a defender.

== Club career statistics ==
As of 16 July 2013

Yazid Yasin's Profile

Club Performance		League		Cup		League Cup		AFC Cup		Total				
Singapore		S.League		Singapore Cup		League Cup		AFC Cup		Total				
Club	Season	Apps	Goals	Apps	Goals	Apps	Goals	Apps	Goals	Yellow card	(yellow card) (yellow-red card)	Red card	Apps	Goals
Geylang United	2009	28	0	0	0	0	0	-	-	0	0	0	28	0
Geylang United	2010	18 (1)	0	0	0	0	0	2	0	1	0	0	20 (1)	0
Geylang United	2011	31	0	1	0	1	0	-	-	1	0	0	33	0
Geylang United	2012	22	0	1	0	0	0	-	-	1	0	0	23	0
Woodlands Wellington	2013	14	0	1	0	3 (1)	0	-	-	2	0	0	18 (1)	0
Geylang International	2015	26	0	4	0	4	0	-	-	1	0	0	34	0

All numbers encased in brackets signify substitute appearances.

=== International appearances ===
#	Date	Venue	Opponent	Result	Competition
1.	29 June 1999	Kallang Stadium, Singapore	New Zealand	0–1	Friendly
Updated 4 November 2012

== Honours ==
Home United

- S.League: 1999
- Singapore Cup: 2000

Woodlands Wellington

- Singapore League Cup: 2007

Geylang United

- Singapore Cup: 2009

Gymkhana

- National Football League Division 2: 2017

Individual

- S.League Young Player of the Year: 1999
