= 1975 National Football League (Singapore) =

1st season of the National Football League in Singapore

National Football League
- Season: 1975
- Champions: Div 1: Geylang Internationals; Div 2: Tampines Rovers; Div 3: Cairnhill FC

The 1975 National Football League was the first season of the National Football League in Singapore.

In 1975, the National Football League was formed when the Football Association of Singapore (FAS) revamped the existing league structure involving 118 teams into a three-tier league with 30 teams. Clubs were required to identify with a constituency or district in Singapore. Several clubs changed their names to comply with this requirement, including International Contract Specialists to Geylang Internationals, Singapore Marble to Toa Payoh United and Hamilton to Jalan Besar.

The 10 clubs chosen for Division One for the first NFL season in 1975 were Changi Constituency, Farrer Park United, Geylang Internationals, Jalan Besar, Jurong Town, Queenstown, SAFSA, Sembawang Constituency, Toa Payoh United and Upper Serangoon United.

Tampines Rovers, who had finished third in the previous year's FAS League, were surprisingly placed in Division Two.

Due to numerous postponements, the season overran into April 1976. The 1976 season started on 8 May 1976.

== Division One ==
Final positions:

- Geylang Internationals
- SAFSA
- Queenstown
- Toa Payoh United
- Farrer Park United
- Changi Constituency
- Jalan Besar
- Jurong Town
- Sembawang Constituency
- Upper Serangoon United

Geylang Internationals won the Division One title on 8 February 1976 with several games to spare.

SAFSA finished second, ahead of Queenstown.

Upper Serangoon United had several matches postponed, and were at risk of expulsion. They were expelled in 1976 for discrepancies in their accounts.

== Division Two ==
Final positions:

- Tampines Rovers
- Ponggol Constituency
- Kaki Bukit SC
- Farrer Park Dynamos
- Ulu Pandan
- Whampoa
- Balestier United
- Changi United
- Kampong Java
- Serangoon Gardens

Tampines Rovers won the Second Division. With two games to play as at 27 February 1976, they had yet to drop a point.

Punggol Constituency finished runners up, and Kaki Bukit SC third.

== Division Three ==
Telok Blangah Constituency, the winners of the 1974 inter-constituency football tournament, were placed in Division Three.

Teams:

- Bukit Panjang United
- Cairnhill Constituency
- Katong FC
- Macpherson
- Mountbatten FC
- Pasir Panjang Constituency
- Tanjong Pagar
- Telok Blangah Constituency
- Tiong Bahru Constituency
- Toa Payoh City

Cairnhill FC won Division Three. Pasir Panjang were also promoted to Division Two for the 1976 season.
