= Yakob Hashim =

Singaporean footballer

Personal information
- Date of birth: 8 November 1960 (age 66)
- Place of birth: Singapore
- Position: Goalkeeper

Senior career*
Years	Team	Apps	(Gls)
- Police SA

International career
- Singapore

Managerial career
- 2012-2017: Yishun Sentek Mariners FC
- * Club domestic league appearances and goals

Yakob Hashim is a former Singaporean football goalkeeper who played for Singapore in the 1984 Asian Cup. He also played for Police SA.

After retirement from his playing career, Yakob became the coach of Singapore National Football League Division 1 club Yishun Sentek Mariners FC.

In 2017, Yakob was elected to the Football Association of Singapore council.
