= Robert Eziakor =

Nigerian footballer and coach

Personal information
- Full name: Robert Eziakor Chinedu
- Date of birth: 19 October 1986 (age 40)
- Place of birth: Onitsha, Anambra State, Nigeria
- Position: Forward

Team information
- Current team: Vacant

Senior career*
Years	Team	Apps	(Gls)
2006	Sporting Afrique		
2007–2008	Katong		
2009	Singapore Recreation Club		
2010–2012	Tiong Bahru		
2013	Hougang United	8	(1)

Managerial career
- 2015–2024: Tiong Bahru
- 2021–2022: Hougang United U17
- 2023–2024: Hougang United U21
- 2023–2024: Hougang United (assistant)
- 2024–2025: Hougang United
- 2026: Tampines Rovers (assistant)
- 2026: Tampines Rovers (interim)
- * Club domestic league appearances and goals

Robert Eziakor Chinedu (born 19 October 1986) is a Nigerian football manager and former player who is recently the interim head coach of Singapore Premier League club Tampines Rovers. Eziakor spent most of his career playing for a host of Singaporean league sides.

== Playing career ==
=== Sporting Afrique ===
In 2006, Eziakor moved to Singapore to joined Sporting Afrique for the 2006 S.League. The team was made of players from an African descent squad consisted of young players from Nigeria, Cameroon, Kenya and Ghana.

=== Katong ===
In 2007, Eziakor joined National Football League (NFL) side, Katong.

=== Singapore Recreation Club ===
In 2009, Eziakor joined another NFL team, Singapore Recreation Club.

=== Tiong Bahru ===
In 2010, Eziakor joined another NFL team, Tiong Bahru.

=== Hougang United ===
After playing semi-professional football for 6 years, In 2013, Eziakor signed for S.League club, Hougang United and was handed the jersey number 20. Registering the most goals for his team in pre-season, he formed a good strike partnership with Guinean Mamadou Diallo, aiming to be on the top scorers charts by the end of the season. During an interview, Eziakor maintained that it was difficult for him to get back into shape for professional football since he was less fit from plying his trade with semi-pro clubs. The forward has stated that he has enjoyed the vehemence and support of the club supporters also known as the Hougang HOOLS, his team's fan club during his time there. On 25 June 2013, Eziakor announced his retirement from football and joined the backroom staff of the club.

== Managerial career ==
=== Tiong Bahru ===
In 2016, Eziakor joined his former club, Tiong Bahru as their head coach for the year.

On 13 October 2018, Eziakor was named the Coach of the Year during the FAST NITE 2018. Tiong Bahru proceed to finish the season unbeaten, claiming the 2018 Division One title. In 2019, Eziakor retained both the Division One title with the club and Coach of the Year award for the second year running.

=== Hougang United ===
In 2017, Eziakor returned to Hougang United to become the club General Coordinator and Safety Officer. In 2021, he became the club team manager before becoming the club assistant coach & Hougang United U21 coach. In 2023, Eziakor was promoted as the assistant coach of the senior team where he work under head coach Marko Kraljević. On 24 December 2024, Eziakor was rewarded as the interim head coach of Hougang United for the remainder of the 2024–25 season after Kraljević was promoted to technical staff of the club. He became the first ever African to become a head coach in the Singapore Premier League history.

=== Tampines Rovers ===
In January 2026, Eziakor joined Tampines Rovers as an assistant coach where he work under head coach Noh Rahman at the club. He is also the head coach for the U-19 team. However, Tampines Rovers parted ways with Noh Rahman where Eziakor was then named as interim coach on 14 February 2026 until the end of the 2025–26 season.

== Personal life ==
Eziakor is a permanent resident of Singapore and has a son who plays for the Singapore Under-15s.

== Managerial statistics ==
As of 3 April 2026

Managerial record by team and tenure
Team	Nat.	From	To	Record					Ref.
Team	Nat.	From	To	G	W	D	L	Win %	Ref.
Hougang United	(Singapore)	24 December 2024	26 October 2025	20	6	3	11	30.00	
Tampines Rovers (interim)	(Singapore)	14 February 2026	3 April 2026	8	5	2	1	62.50	
Career Total				28	11	5	12	39.29	
