= Wachira =

Wachira (also "Wacira" or "Wachiira") is a male name among the Kikuyu, also called Gikuyu, and related Bantu peoples of Kenya. Derived from "Chira" or Case. "Wa" signifies that one who deals with cases. Some contend that the name signifies one who feels and senses much that they do not fully understand, and can be deeply influenced through the thoughts of others without realizing just how you are being affected. Notable people with the name include:

- Benedict Wachira (born 1985), Kenyan activist
- John Wachira, winner of the 2009 Two Oceans Marathon
- Nicholas Wachira (born 1982), Kenyan middle-distance runner
- Simon Wachira (born 1984), Kenyan race walker
- Wachira Sangsri (born 1986), professional footballer from Thailand
