= Hairi Su'ap =

Singaporean football manager

Personal information
- Full name: Mohammad Hairi Su'ap
- Place of birth: Singapore

Managerial career
- Years: Team
- 2013-2014: Warriors U15
- 2015-2017: ITE College West
- 2018-2020: Yishun Sentek Mariners
- 2020: Tanjong Pagar United FC
- 2022-: Yishun Sentek Mariners

Hairi Su'ap (born in Singapore) is a Singaporean football manager who is the current head coach for Yishun Sentek Mariners in his home country.

== Career ==
Hairi started his managerial career as a Sport Trainers after his retired playing for SAFFC (Now known as Warriors) in which he moved on to doing Medical for 5 years before making his deciding on being a Coach in which he holds the AFC 'C' coaching license. He started his managerial career focusing translating with the youth with Warriors FC before moving on to coach ITE College West school team. In 2018, Hairi than got his first taste of coaching a club with senior players with Singapore Football League semi-professional club, Yishun Sentek Mariners.

On 25 January 2020, he was appointed head coach of Tanjong Pagar United in the Singapore Premier League, a position he first experience as a coach of a professional team but his reign got cut short as on 14 October 2020. Hairi has resigned to pursue other interests in which his assistant, Hasrin Jailani stepping up to fill the role until the end of the season.

In 2022, he returned to coach Yishun Sentek Mariners.
