= Liam Shotton =

English footballer (born 1987)

Personal information
- Date of birth: 28 May 1987 (age 39)
- Place of birth: England
- Position: Striker

Senior career*
Years	Team	Apps	(Gls)
2007–2008	Kidsgrove Athletic	17	(9)
2008–2009	Nantwich Town	31	(15)
2009–2011	Kidsgrove Athletic	27	(14)
2011–2012	Stafford Rangers	18	(8)
2012	Kidsgrove Athletic	29	(7)
2013–2014	Hougang United	24	(10)
2014–2015	Leek Town	25	(19)
2015–2016	Nantwich Town List of football clubs in Singapore	30	(18)
2016	Singapore Cricket Club	33	(30)
2017-2019	Tiong Bahru FC		
2019–2024	Singapore FC	17	(22)
2025	Jungfrau Punggol FC		(4)
- * Club domestic league appearances and goals

Liam Shotton (born 28 May 1987) is an English footballer who plays as a striker. He plays for Jungfrau Punggol FC in the Singapore Football League Division 1, whicih is the second tier of Singapore football.

== Career ==
After playing in non-League football in England, Shotton joined S. League side Hougang United in January 2013. He went on to make 28 appearances in all competitions for Hougang, scoring five times.

Shotton won National Football League Division One Player of the Year and received the prize at FAS Nite 2019 on 31 October 2019.

== Personal life ==
He is the elder brother of Hanley Town player/manager Ryan Shotton.
