= 2026 Island Wide League =

Football league season

Island Wide League
- Season: 2026
- Dates: 16 May to 16 August 2025
- Champions: Tiong Bahru
- Promoted: Tiong Bahru; Jurong City
- Matches: 70
- Goals: 322 (4.6 per match)
- Top goalscorer: Gabriel Quak (20 goals)
- Biggest home win: Sembawang City 9-0 Eunos Crescent (18 Jul 2026)
- Biggest away win: Mattar 0-10 Sembawang City (20 Jun 2026)
- Highest scoring: GFA Petir 8-2 Pasirian Lions (23 May 2026); Winchester 2-8 Tiong Bahru (6 Jun 2026)

The 2026 Island Wide League is the 2026 season of the Island Wide League (IWL), the fourth-tier men's football league in Singapore under the Football Association of Singapore.

== Summary ==
On 20 March 2026, the Football Association of Singapore (FAS) invited non-member clubs to register their interest in participating in the Island Wide League 2026 (IWL). The competition will be held from 16 May to August 2026.

The group matches are mainly played in Secondary Schools.

Tiong Bahru and Westwood El'Junior will be playing in the league this season, after being relegated from the 2025 Singapore Football League 2.

2025 IWL teams Admiralty City, Commonwealth Cosmos, Tessensohn Khalsa Rovers, Verde Cresta Combined and Yishun FC did not participate in the 2026 season.

Eunos Crescent, Sembawang Park Rangers and Singapore Recreation Club will mark their return to the Island Wide League after sitting out the 2025 season.

GFA Petir and Jurong City will be making their debut in Singapore Football League after registering for the 2026 IWL season.

On 23 June 2026, FAS announced that Ayer Rajah Gryphons, GFA Petir, and Bedok South Avenue have breached the substitution regulations concerning the fielding of Under-23 Singaporean players. In their respective matches, the clubs have failed to maintain the required minimum of two Under-23 Singaporean players on the field following substitutions. Three points were awarded to the non-infringing team.

On 16 August 2026, Tiong Bahru were crowned the champions after a 3-0 victory over Jurong City in the 2026 IWL final at Jurong East Stadium. Having been relegated from the SFL2 last year, the club will return, along with Jurong City, to the SFL2 next season.

== Competition format ==
The IWL competition shall be played on a single round-robin Group Stage basis, followed by a single-leg Knockout Stage.

Teams have been split into three groups of seven for the single round-robin group stage. Top two teams from each group, together with the two best third-placed teams, will proceed to the single-legged knock-out stage.

At the conclusion of the IWL 2026 Season, the two finalists of the IWL shall be promoted to the SFL 2 for the following season.

== Group stage ==
=== Group A ===
Pos	Team	Pld	W	D	L	GF	GA	GD	Pts	TBF	SRC	SXH	WIF	WLF	SPR	BTM
1	Tiong Bahru FC (Q)	6	4	1	1	22	12	+10	13	—	—	5–3	—	—	2–0	2–1
2	Singapore Recreation Club (Q)	6	4	1	1	13	8	+5	13	2–1	—	—	2–2	—	—	3–0
3	Singapore Xin Hua FC (Q)	6	4	0	2	20	11	+9	12	—	4–1	—	—	5–0	4–2	—
4	Winchester Isla FC	6	2	2	2	15	18	−3	8	2–8	—	3–2	—	—	—	4–1
5	Woodlands Lions FC	6	2	1	3	10	16	−6	7	4–4	0–2	—	2–1	—	—	—
6	Sembawang Park Rangers FC	6	1	1	4	9	17	−8	4	—	1–3	—	3–3	3–2	—	—
7	Bukit Timah FC	6	1	0	5	6	13	−7	3	—	—	0–2	—		3–0	—

Source: fas.org.sg
Rules for classification: 1) points; 2) goal difference; 3) number of goals scored; 4) number of wins
(Q) Qualified for Quarter-finals

=== Group B ===
Pos	Team	Pld	W	D	L	GF	GA	GD	Pts	WEJ	WRF	BSA	ETR	ARG	EDF	SUF
1	Westwood El'Junior FC (Q)	6	5	0	1	22	10	+12	15	—	—	3–0	4–2	3–1	—	—
2	Woodlands Rangers FC (Q)	6	4	1	1	18	8	+10	13	4–1	—	1–3	—	2–2	—	—
3	Bedok South Avenue SC (Q)	6	4	0	2	20	8	+12	12	—	—	—	0–2	—	5–2	8–0
4	Eastern Thunder FC	6	4	0	2	19	8	+11	12	—	1–3	—	—	—	4–0	7–1
5	Ayer Rajah Gryphons FC	6	1	1	4	8	17	−9	4	—	—	0–4	0–3	—	5–2	—
6	East Dragon FC	6	1	0	5	7	24	−17	3	1–5	0–5	—	—	—	—	2–0
7	Simei United FC	6	1	0	5	7	26	−19	3	2–6	1–3	—	—	3–0	—	—

Source: fas.org.sg
Rules for classification: 1) points; 2) goal difference; 3) number of goals scored; 4) number of wins
(Q) Qualified for Quarter-finals.

=== Group C ===
Pos	Team	Pld	W	D	L	GF	GA	GD	Pts	SCF	JCF	GSF	ECF	MSF	GFA	PLF
1	Sembawang City FC (Q)	6	5	0	1	32	6	+26	15	—	1–3	5–2	9–0	—	—	—
2	Jurong City FC (Q)	6	4	1	1	21	10	+11	13	—	—	6–1	2–3	—	4–1	—
3	Geylang Serai FC	6	3	0	3	15	12	+3	9	—	—	—	2–1	2–0	1–3	—
4	Eunos Crescent FC	6	3	0	3	11	18	−7	9	—	—	—	—	2–1	0–2	5–2
5	Mattar Sailors FC	6	2	1	3	10	16	−6	7	0–8	3–3	—	—	—	—	3–1
6	GFA Petir FC	6	2	1	3	10	17	−7	7	1–2	—	—	—	0–3	—	8–2
7	Pasirian Lions FC	6	0	1	5	8	28	−20	1	0–7	1–3	2–2	—	—	—	—

Source: fas.org.sg
Rules for classification: 1) points; 2) goal difference; 3) number of goals scored; 4) number of wins
(Q) Qualified for Quarter-finals.

== Knock-out stage ==
=== Quarter-Finals ===
26 July 2026 QF1	Sembawang City	4-2	Singapore Xin Hua	Bedok Stadium
17:00 UTC+8	Yasir 5'; Gabriel 51', 90+4'; Shafeeq 19'	Report	39'; 90+4'

26 July 2026 QF2	Jurong City	2-0	Woodlands Rangers	Bedok Stadium
19:30 UTC+8	Goal	Report

26 July 2026 QF3	Westwood El’Junior	1-1	Bedok South Avenue	Choa Chu Kang Stadium
17:00 UTC+8	Goal		Goal

26 July 2026 QF4	Tiong Bahru	1-0	Singapore Recreation Club	Choa Chu Kang Stadium
19:30 UTC+8	Goal

=== Semi Finals ===
2 August 2026 SF1	Sembawang City	0-1	Jurong City	Bedok Stadium
17:00 UTC+8			Goal	Man of the Match: Adli Amirulzaman

2 August 2026 SF2	Westwood El’Junior	1-3	Tiong Bahru	Bedok Stadium
17:30 UTC+8	Goal		Goal

=== Final ===
16 August 2026
17:30 UTC+8

Jurong City	0-3	Tiong Bahru
	Report	Fitri Mohamed 13'; Nashrul Amin 64', 68'

Jurong East Stadium, Singapore

Note: Both teams will be promoted to 2027 SFL2 after qualifying for the Final.

== Awards ==
=== Top scorers ===
Updated on 19 August 2026

Rank	Player	Club	Goals
1	(Singapore) Gabriel Quak Jun Yi	Sembawang City	20
2	(Singapore) Mohamed Mustaffa Bin Ali	Woodlands Rangers	10
3	(Singapore) Delphis Chua Wen Jie	Eastern Thunder	8
3	(Singapore) Muhammad Affan Syahin Bin Mohammad Shahrin	Tiong Bahru	8

Source: fas.org.sg

== See also ==
- 2026–27 Singapore Football League
- Singapore FA Cup
- Football in Singapore
- Football Association of Singapore
