= 2015 Geylang International FC season =

Geylang International FC
2015 season
- Chairman: (Singapore) Leong Kok Fann
- Coach: (Germany) Jörg Steinebrunner
- Ground: Bedok Stadium
- S.League: 8th
- Singapore Cup: Quarter-finals
- League Cup: Semi-finals
- Top goalscorer: League: Bruno Castanheira (12); Jozef Kaplan (12); All: Bruno Castanheira (18)

The 2015 S.League season was Geylang International's 20th season in the top flight of Singapore football and 40th year in existence as a football club. The club also competed in the Kata Group Hotel Challenge Cup, Singapore League Cup and the Singapore Cup.

== Squad ==
| No. | Name | Nationality | Position (s) | Date of Birth (Age) |
Goalkeepers
| 1 | Hairul Syirhan | (Singapore) | GK | 21 August 1995 (age 31) |
| 13 | Farhan Amin | (Singapore) | GK | 20 April 1990 (age 36) |
| 18 | Yazid Yasin | (Singapore) | GK | 24 June 1979 (age 47) |
Defenders
| 2 | Khairulnizam Jumahat | (Singapore) | DF | 8 December 1989 (age 36) |
| 3 | Yuki Ichikawa | (Japan) | DF | 29 August 1987 (age 39) |
| 4 | Sevki Sha'ban | (Singapore) | DF | 2 May 1985 (age 41) |
| 5 | Kento Fukuda | (Japan) | DF | 15 May 1990 (age 36) |
| 6 | Anaz Hadee | (Singapore) | DF | 24 September 1983 (age 42) |
| 8 | Syed Thaha | (Singapore) | DF | 2 May 1985 (age 41) |
| 16 | Hafiz Osman | (Singapore) | DF | 15 February 1984 (age 42) |
Midfielders
| 7 | Mustaqim Manzur | (Singapore) | MF | 28 January 1982 (age 44) |
| 10 | Tatsuro Inui | (Japan) | MF | 30 January 1990 (age 36) |
| 11 | Hafiz Nor | (Singapore) | MF | 22 August 1988 (age 38) |
| 14 | Huzaifah Aziz | (Singapore) | MF | 26 July 1994 (age 32) |
| 15 | Shah Hirul | (Singapore) | MF | 7 May 1986 (age 40) |
| 20 | Nor Azli Yusoff | (Singapore) | MF | 17 March 1986 (age 40) |
Forwards
| 9 | Shawal Anuar | (Singapore) | FW | 29 April 1991 (age 35) |
| 17 | Jozef Kaplan | (Slovakia) | FW | 2 April 1986 (age 40) |
| 19 | Bruno Castanheira | (Brazil) | FW | 15 May 1990 (age 36) |

== Coaching staff ==
| Position | Name |
|---|---|
| Head coach | (Germany) Jörg Steinbrunner |
| Assistant coach | (England) Owen Monaghan |
| Goalkeeping coach | (Australia) Scott Scar |
| Team manager | (Singapore) Andrew Ang |
| Kitman | (Singapore) Faisal Latiff |

== Pre-Season Transfers ==
=== In ===
| Position | Player | Transferred From | Ref |
|---|---|---|---|
| GK | (Singapore) Hairul Syirhan | (Singapore) Geylang International U23 | |
| DF | (Singapore) Anaz Hadee | (Singapore) Tampines Rovers | |
| DF | (Singapore) Syed Thaha | (Singapore) Balestier Khalsa | |
| FW | (Singapore) Shawal Anuar | (Singapore) Geylang International U23 | |
| MF | (Japan) Tatsuro Inui | Free transfer | |
| GK | (Singapore) Farhan Amin | (Singapore) Home United | |
| MF | (Singapore) Huzaifah Aziz | (Singapore) Geylang International U23 | |
| FW | (Slovakia) Jozef Kaplan | (Singapore) Tampines Rovers | |
| GK | (Singapore) Yazid Yasin | (Singapore) Woodlands Wellington | |
| FW | (Brazil) Bruno Castanheira | (Singapore) Home United | |
| MF | (Singapore) Nor Azli Yusoff | (Singapore) Tanjong Pagar United | |
| DF | (Singapore) Sevki Sha'ban | (Singapore) Home United | |
| DF | (Singapore) Hafiz Osman | (Singapore) Tanjong Pagar United | |

=== Out ===
| Position | Player | Transferred To | Ref |
|---|---|---|---|
| GK | (Singapore) Siddiq Durimi | (Singapore) Tampines Rovers | |
| MF | (Singapore) Hamqaamal Shah | (Singapore) Warriors FC | |
| DF | (Singapore) Jalal Jasim | Retired | |
| FW | (Argentina) Leonel Felice | (Argentina) Jorge Newbery VM | |
| MF | (Argentina) Franco Chivilo | (Argentina) Deportivo Merlo | |
| MF | (Singapore) Fabian Kwok | (Singapore) Tampines Rovers | |
| MF | (Singapore) K.Sathiaraj | Retired | |
| FW | (Germany) Thorsten Schneider | (Germany) VfL Sindelfingen | |
| MF | (Singapore) Aliff Shafaein | Retired | |
| FW | (Singapore) Ridhuan Muhammad | (Singapore) Tampines Rovers | |
| GK | (Singapore) Joey Sim | (Singapore) Tampines Rovers | |

== Pre-season Friendlies ==
| 6 December 2014 Pre-Season Friendly | (Singapore) Geylang International | 4–1 | Singapore Cricket Club | SCC Dempsey Field |
| 17:00 GMT+8 |

| 10 December 2014 Pre-Season Friendly | (Singapore) Geylang International | 5–0 | (Singapore) Sporting Westlake FC | SCC Dempsey Field |
| 17:00 GMT+8 |

| 13 December 2014 Pre-Season Friendly | (Singapore) Geylang International | 3–0 | Singapore Cricket Club | SCC Dempsey Field |
| 17:00 GMT+8 |

| 27 December 2014 Pre-Season Friendly | (Singapore) Geylang International | 2–2 | (Singapore) LionsXII | Bedok Stadium |
| 17:00 GMT+8 |

| 10 January 2015 Pre-Season Friendly | (Singapore) Geylang International | 4–1 | Singapore Olympic Team | Bedok Stadium |
| 17:00 GMT+8 |

| 28 January 2015 Pre-Season Friendly | (Singapore) Warriors FC | 2–2 | (Singapore) Geylang International | Woodlands Stadium |
| 17:00 GMT+8 |

| 3 February 2015 Pre-Season Friendly | (Singapore) Geylang International | 2–0 | (Singapore) Police SA | Bedok Stadium |
| 17:00 GMT+8 |

| 14 February 2015 Pre-Season Friendly | (Indonesia) Semen Padang | 1–1 | (Singapore) Geylang International | Stadion Gelora Citramas |
| 16:45 GMT+8 |

| 24 February 2015 Pre-Season Friendly | (Malaysia) Felda United FC | 2–2 | (Singapore) Geylang International | Stadium Mini UKM |
| 20:45 GMT+8 |

== Kata Group Hotel Challenge Cup 2015 ==
| 15 January 2015 Challenge Cup (1st leg) | (Thailand) Phuket FC | 1–3 | (Singapore) Geylang International | Jalan Besar Stadium |
| 17:00 GMT+8 |

| 17 January 2015 Challenge Cup (2nd leg) | (Singapore) Geylang International | 2–1 | (Thailand) Phuket FC | Bedok Stadium |
| 17:00 GMT+8 |

== Club Friendlies ==
| 19 March 2015 Club Friendly | (Singapore) Geylang International | 4–1 | Singapore Cricket Club | Bedok Stadium |
| 19:30 GMT+8 |

| 12 June 2015 Club Friendly | (Singapore) Hougang United | 1–4 | (Singapore) Geylang International | Hougang Stadium |
| 19:00 GMT+8 |

| 20 July 2015 Club Friendly | (Singapore) Geylang International | 4–0 | (Singapore) Tiong Bahru FC | Bedok Stadium |
| 17:00 GMT+8 |

== S.League ==
=== Round 1 ===
| 3 March 2015 1 | (Singapore) Geylang International | 1–1 | (Singapore) Home United | Bedok Stadium |
| 19:30 GMT+8 | Jozef Kapláň 46'; Nor Azli Yusoff (yellow card) 49'; Shah Hirul (yellow card) 59' | Report | Ken Ilsø 23' (yellow card) 70'; Song Uiyoung (yellow card) 26'; Shah Hirul (yellow card) 61'; Kamel Ramdani (yellow card) 61' | Attendance: 1531; Referee: Muhd Taqi |

| 6 March 2015 2 | (Singapore) Balestier Khalsa | 2–1 | (Singapore) Geylang International | Toa Payoh Stadium |
| 19:30 GMT+8 | Robert Pericic 44'; Miroslav Krištić (yellow card) 70'; Miroslav Krištić 79'; Fadhil Noh (yellow card) 90' | Report | Hafiz Osman (yellow card) 3'; Jozef Kapláň 45' | Referee: Farhad Mohd |

| 12 March 2015 3 | (Singapore) Geylang International | 0–0 | (Singapore) Hougang United | Bedok Stadium |
| 19:30 GMT+8 | | Report | Renshi Yamaguchi (yellow card) 63'; Matthew Abraham (yellow card) 65' | Referee: W Ravisanthiran |

| 3 April 2015 4 | (Singapore) Geylang International | 3–2 | (Singapore) Tampines Rovers | Jalan Besar Stadium |
| 19:30 GMT+8 | Yuki Ichikawa 26'; Hafiz Nor (yellow card) 37'; Jozef Kaplan 61' (pen); Bruno Castanheira 89'; Nor Azli Yusoff (red card) 90' | Report | Firdaus Idros 12'; Eddy Viator (yellow card) 78'; Noh Alam Shah 87' | Referee: Jansen Foo |

| 8 April 2015 5 | (Japan) Albirex Niigata Singapore | 1–0 | (Singapore) Geylang International | Jurong East Stadium |
| 19:30 GMT+8 | Rion Taki 11' | Report | | Referee: Nathan Chan |

| 16 April 2015 6 | (Singapore) Geylang International | 0–1 | Brunei DPMM | Bedok Stadium |
| 19:30 GMT+8 | Khairulnizam Jumahat (yellow card) 90' | Report | Azwan Ali (yellow card) 44'; Paulo Sérgio 81' | Referee: Ahmad A'Qashah |

| 20 April 2015 7 | (Malaysia) Harimau Muda B | 2–1 | (Singapore) Geylang International | Hang Jebat Stadium |
| 20:00 GMT+8 | Ridzuan Abdunloh Pula 9' (pen); Akhir Bahari 13' | Report | Jozef Kaplan 45'; Khairulnizam Jumahat (yellow card) 90' | Referee: Farhad Mohd |

| 2 May 2015 8 | (Singapore) Geylang International | 3–1 | (Singapore) Warriors | Bedok Stadium |
| 19:30 GMT+8 | Jozef Kaplan 14'; Bruno Castanheira 37'; Jozef Kaplan 84' | Report | Fazrul Nawaz 57'; Daniel Bennett (yellow card) 79'; Hafiz Rahim (yellow card) 87'; Kevin McCann (yellow card) 89' | Referee: Ahmad A'Qashah |

=== Round 2 ===
| 8 May 2015 9 | (Singapore) Home United | 0–1 | (Singapore) Geylang International | Jalan Besar Stadium |
| 19:30 GMT+8 | Ang Zhi Wei (yellow card) 34' | Report | Tatsuro Inui 44'; Nor Azli Yusoff (yellow card) 53'; Hafiz Osman (yellow card) 90' | Referee: Sukhbir Singh |

| 16 May 2015 10 | (Singapore) Geylang International | 2–2 | (Singapore) Balestier Khalsa | Jalan Besar Stadium |
| 19:30 GMT+8 | Hafiz Osman (yellow card) 13'; Syed Thaha (yellow card) 67'; Jozef Kaplan 50'; Bruno Castanheira 90' | Report | Robert Pericic 10'; Robert Pericic 39'; Miroslav Kristic (yellow card) 58' | Referee: Jansen Foo |

| 19 May 2015 11 | (Singapore) Hougang United | 1–0 | (Singapore) Geylang International | Hougang Stadium |
| 19:30 GMT+8 | Tengku Mushadad (yellow card) 26'; Francisco Ela 73'; Muhaymin Salim (yellow card) 86' | Report | | Referee: Nathan Chan |

| 22 July 2015 12 | (Singapore) Geylang International | 1–2 | (Malaysia) Harimau Muda B | Jalan Besar Stadium |
| 19:30 GMT+8 | Jozef Kaplan 16' (pen); Hafiz Osman (red card) 90' | Report | Syafwan Syahlan 74'; Kento Fukuda 83' (o.g.) | Referee: Muhd Syahir |

| 29 July 2015 13 | (Singapore) Tampines Rovers | 2–0 | (Singapore) Geylang International | Jurong West Stadium |
| 19:30 GMT+8 | Ismadi Mukhtar 8'; Isa Halim 12'; Mateo Roskam 49'; Zulfadli Zainal (yellow card) 90' | Report | | Referee: Muhd Taqi |

| 2 August 2015 14 | (Singapore) Geylang International | 0–2 | (Japan) Albirex Niigata Singapore | Bedok Stadium |
| 19:30 GMT+8 | Jozef Kaplan (yellow card) 52'; Nor Azli Yusoff (yellow card) 73' | Report | Fumiya Kogure 16'; Atsushi Kawata 50' (yellow card) 90'; Kento Nagasaki (red card) 90' | Referee: Jansen Foo |

| 5 August 2015 15 | Brunei DPMM | 3–1 | (Singapore) Geylang International | Sultan Hassanal Bolkiah Stadium |
| 20:15 GMT+8 | Azwan Ali 8'; Azwan Salleh 39'; Rafael Ramazotti 48' (yellow card) 64' | Report | Shawal Anuar 32'; Hafiz Nor (yellow card) 90' | Referee: W Ravisanthiran |

| 20 August 2015 16 | (Singapore) Geylang International | 1–3 | (Singapore) Young Lions | Bedok Stadium |
| 19:30 GMT+8 | Jozef Kaplan 3'; Anaz Hadee (red card) 73' | Report | Farhan Rahmat 8'; Jordan Webb (yellow card) 31'; Jordan Webb 47'; Naiim Ishak 51' (yellow card) 86'; Sheikh Abdul Hadi (yellow card) 82' | Referee: Nathan Chan |

| 29 August 2015 17 | (Singapore) Warriors | 1–1 | (Singapore) Geylang International | Jalan Besar Stadium |
| 19:30 GMT+8 | Hafiz Rahim 58' | Report | Jozef Kaplan 90' | Referee: W Ravisanthiran |

=== Round 3 ===
| 18 September 2015 18 | (Singapore) Balestier Khalsa | 2–2 | (Singapore) Geylang International | Jalan Besar Stadium |
| 19:30 GMT+8 | Ignatius Ang 22'; Miroslav Kristic 24' (yellow card) 86'; Nurullah Hussein (yellow card) 76' | Report | Hafiz Osman 12' (yellow card) 36'; Syed Thaha (yellow card) 21'; Shah Hirul 29' | Referee: Farhan Mohd |

| 4 October 2015 19 | (Singapore) Courts Young Lions | 2–3 | (Singapore) Geylang International | Jalan Besar Stadium |
| 19:30 GMT+8 | Anumanthan Kumar (yellow card) 8'; Jordan Webb 25'; Shameer Aziq 63'; Afiq Noor (yellow card) 72' (red card); Shahfiq Ghani 79' | Report | Bruno Castanheira 37' 59' 77'; Shah Hirul (yellow card) 56' | Referee: Jansen Foo |

| 16 October 2015 20 | (Malaysia) Harimau Muda B | 2–0 | (Singapore) Geylang International | Hang Jebat Stadium |
| 20:45 GMT+8 | Faizat Ghazli 5'; Arif Anwar 80' (pen) (yellow card) 88' (red card); Ariff Farhan (yellow card) 90' | Report | Afiq Noor (yellow card) 72' | Referee: Ahmad A'Qashah |

| 20 October 2015 21 | (Singapore) Geylang International | 1–4 | (Singapore) Tampines Rovers | Bedok Stadium |
| 19:30 GMT+8 | Yazid Yasin (yellow card) 86'; Shawal Anuar 90' | Report | Mateo Roskam 20'; Fabian Kwok 26'; Ismail Yunos (yellow card) 35'; Rodrigo Tosi 55' (pen); Aqhari Abdullah 82' | Referee: Farhad Mohd |

| 26 October 2015 22 | (Japan) Albirex Niigata Singapore | 2–0 | (Singapore) Geylang International | Jurong East Stadium |
| 19:30 GMT+8 | Shun Inaba (yellow card) 12'; Syed Thaha 76' (o.g.); Yusuke Mukai 80' | Report | | Referee: Muhd Syahir |

| 30 October 2015 23 | (Singapore) Geylang International | 2–1 | (Singapore) Home United | Jalan Besar Stadium |
| 19:30 GMT+8 | Kento Fukuda (yellow card) 16' (goal) 63'; Syed Thaha (yellow card) 53'; Bruno Castanheira 90' | Report | Ambroise Begue 41'; Ken Ilsø (yellow card) 53'; Hyrulnizam Juma'at (red card) 84' | Referee: Jansen Foo |

| 3 November 2015 24 | (Singapore) Geylang International | 2–1 | Brunei DPMM | Bedok Stadium |
| 19:30 GMT+8 | Hafiz Nor 46'; Bruno Castanheira 58'; Tatsuro Inui (yellow card) 70'; Huzaifah Aziz (yellow card) 84' | Report | Rafael Ramazotti 28' | Referee: Jansen Foo |

| 6 November 2015 25 | (Singapore) Young Lions | 2–2 | (Singapore) Geylang International | Jalan Besar Stadium |
| 19:30 GMT+8 | Bruno Castanheira 24'; Shawal Anuar (yellow card) 62'; Huzaifah Aziz (yellow card) 64' | Report | Irfan Fandi 73' (yellow card) 90'; Huzaifah Aziz 79' (o.g.) | Referee: Muhd Syahir |

| 9 November 2015 26 | (Singapore) Geylang International | 2–2 | (Singapore) Hougang United | Bedok Stadium |
| 19:30 GMT+8 | Hafiz Osman (yellow card) 38'; Tatsuro Inui (yellow card) 40'; Shawal Anuar 72'; Bruno Castanheira 90' | Report | Yuki Uchiyama (yellow card) 27'; Fazli Jaffar (yellow card) 55'; Vuk Sotirovic 76' (pen); Nurhilmi Jasni (yellow card) 86'; Fareez Farhan (yellow card) 90' | Referee: Farhad Mohd |

| 20 November 2015 27 | (Singapore) Geylang International | 6–0 | (Singapore) Warriors | Bedok Stadium |
| 19:30 GMT+8 | Yuki Ichikawa 8'; Bruno Castanheira 14' 86'; Hafiz Osman (yellow card) 58'; Jozef Kaplan 78' 84'; Hafiz Nor 80' | Report | Daniel Bennett (yellow card) 69' | Referee: W Ravisanthiran |

== Singapore League Cup ==
| 23 June 2015 Semi-finals | (Singapore) Geylang International | 4–0 | Singapore Recreation Club | Jalan Besar Stadium |
| 20:30 GMT+8 | Bruno Castanheira 9'; Hafiz Nor 12' 22' 45' | Report | Samuel Balls (yellow card) 63' | Referee: Muhd Syahir |

| 27 June 2015 Group Stage | (Singapore) Hougang United | 2–2 | (Singapore) Geylang International | Hougang Stadium |
| 20:30 GMT+8 | Tengku Mushadad (yellow card) 75'; Diego Gama 86' 90' | Report | Jozef Kaplan 22'; Tatsuro Inui 53'; Hafiz Osman (yellow card) 80' | Referee: Muhd Taqi |

| 2 July 2015 Group Stage | (Singapore) Geylang International | 4–2 | Brunei DPMM | Jalan Besar Stadium |
| 20:30 GMT+8 | Bruno Castanheira 15' 69' 71'; Jozef Kaplan 22'; Hafiz Nor (yellow card) 25' | Report | Maududi Hilmi Kasmi (yellow card) 18'; Paulo Sérgio (yellow card) 26' (goal) 30'; Joseph Gamble (yellow card) 26'; Rafael Ramazotti 38' | Referee: Sukhbir Singh |

| 5 July 2015 Semi-finals | (Singapore) Geylang International | 0–3 | (Japan) Albirex Niigata Singapore | Jalan Besar Stadium |
| 20:30 GMT+8 | | Report | Atsushi Kawata 11'; Kento Nagasaki 82'; Fumiya Kogure 87' | Referee: Farhad Mohd |

== Singapore Cup ==
| 26 May 2015 First round | (Singapore) Geylang International | 2–1 | (Laos) Lao Police Club | Bedok Stadium |
| 19:30 GMT+8 | Hafiz Nor (yellow card) 43' (goal) 69'; Jozef Kapláň 85' (pen) | Report | Khounta Sivongthong 26'; Thenthong Phongsettha (yellow card) 43' | Referee: W Ravisanthiran |

| 13 August 2015 Quarter-finals (1st Leg) | (Philippines) Global | 0–1 | (Singapore) Geylang International | Jalan Besar Stadium |
| 19:30 GMT+8 | Dennis Villanueva (yellow card) 12'; Paulo Salenga (yellow card) 90' | Report | Jozef Kaplan (yellow card) 87' | Referee: Farhad Mohd |

| 16 August 2015 Quarter-finals (2nd Leg) | (Singapore) Geylang International | 1–4 | (Philippines) Global | Bedok Stadium |
| 19:30 GMT+8 | Hafiz Osman (yellow card) 27'; Shawal Anuar (yellow card) 57'; Anaz Hadee (yellow card) 59'; Bruno Castanheira 76'; Jozef Kaplan (yellow card) 104'; Nor Azl (yellow card) 104' | Report | Andrew Hartmann 20' 102' 120'; Norio Suzuki (yellow card) 69'; Daisuke Sato (yellow card) 78'; Paulo Salenga 80' | Referee: Jansen Foo |

== Team statistics ==
=== Appearances ===
- Numbers in parentheses denote appearances as substitute.

| No. | Pos. | Nat. | Name | S.League | League Cup | Singapore Cup | Total |
| No. | Pos. | Nat. | Name | Apps | Apps | Apps | Apps |
|---|---|---|---|---|---|---|---|
| 1 | GK | (Singapore) | Hairul Syirhan | 1 | 0 | 0 | 1 |
| 2 | DF | (Singapore) | Khairulnizam Jumahat | 6 (8) | 1 (3) | 2 (1) | 9 (12) |
| 3 | DF | (Japan) | Yuki Ichikawa | 22 | 4 | 1 | 27 |
| 4 | DF | (Singapore) | Sevki Shaban | 0 (2) | 0 | 0 | 0 (2) |
| 5 | DF | (Singapore) | Kento Fukuda | 25 | 4 | 3 | 32 |
| 6 | DF | (Singapore) | Anaz Hadee | 17 (4) | 2 (1) | 3 | 22 (5) |
| 7 | MF | (Singapore) | Mustaqim Manzur | 15 (9) | 1 (1) | 1 (2) | 17 (12) |
| 8 | DF | (Singapore) | Syed Thaha | 22 (4) | 4 | 1 | 27 (4) |
| 9 | FW | (Singapore) | Shawal Anuar | 11 (11) | 0 (3) | 2 (1) | 14 (15) |
| 10 | MF | (Japan) | Tatsuro Inui | 23 (4) | 4 | 3 | 30 (4) |
| 11 | MF | (Singapore) | Hafiz Nor | 26 (1) | 4 | 3 | 33 (1) |
| 13 | GK | (Singapore) | Farhan Amin | 0 (1) | 0 | 0 | 0 (1) |
| 14 | MF | (Singapore) | Huzaifah Aziz | 0 (11) | 0 (2) | 0 | 0 (13) |
| 15 | MF | (Singapore) | Shah Hirul | 12 (8) | 0 (2) | 2 (1) | 14 (11) |
| 16 | DF | (Singapore) | Hafiz Osman | 24 | 4 | 2 | 30 |
| 17 | FW | (Slovakia) | Jozef Kaplan | 27 | 4 | 3 | 34 |
| 18 | GK | (Singapore) | Yazid Yasin | 26 | 4 | 3 | 33 |
| 19 | FW | (Brazil) | Bruno Castanheira | 23 (2) | 4 | 1 (2) | 28 (2) |
| 20 | MF | (Singapore) | Nor Azli Yusof | 23 | 2 | 3 | 28 |

=== Goalscorers ===
| Rank | Pos. | No. | Player | S.League | League Cup | Singapore Cup | Total |
|---|---|---|---|---|---|---|---|
| 1 | FW | 19 | (Brazil) Bruno Castanheira | 12 | 5 | 1 | 18 |
| 2 | FW | 17 | (Slovakia) Jozef Kaplan | 12 | 2 | 2 | 16 |
| 3 | MF | 11 | (Singapore) Hafiz Nor | 2 | 3 | 1 | 6 |
| 4 | FW | 9 | (Singapore) Shawal Anuar | 4 | 0 | 0 | 4 |
| 5 | DF | 3 | (Japan) Yuki Ichikawa | 2 | 0 | 0 | 2 |
| 6 | MF | 10 | (Japan) Tatsuro Inui | 1 | 0 | 0 | 1 |
| 6 | MF | 16 | (Singapore) Hafiz Osman | 1 | 0 | 0 | 1 |
| TOTALS | | | | 34 | 10 | 4 | 48 |

=== Disciplinary record ===
| No. | Pos. | Name | S.League | | League Cup | | Singapore Cup | | Total | |
| No. | Pos. | Name | Booked | Sent off (straight red) | Booked | Sent off (straight red) | Booked | Sent off (straight red) | Booked | Sent off (straight red) |
|---|---|---|---|---|---|---|---|---|---|---|
| 1 | GK | (Singapore) Hairul Syirhan | 0 | 0 | 0 | 0 | 0 | 0 | 0 | 0 |
| 2 | DF | (Singapore) Khairulnizam Jumahat | 1 | 0 | 0 | 0 | 0 | 0 | 1 | 0 |
| 3 | DF | (Japan) Yuki Ichikawa | 1 | 0 | 0 | 0 | 0 | 0 | 1 | 0 |
| 4 | DF | (Singapore) Sevki Shaban | 0 | 0 | 0 | 0 | 0 | 0 | 0 | 0 |
| 5 | DF | (Japan) Kento Fukuda | 1 | 0 | 0 | 0 | 0 | 0 | 1 | 0 |
| 6 | DF | (Singapore) Anaz Hadee | 0 | 1 | 0 | 0 | 1 | 0 | 1 | 1 |
| 7 | MF | (Singapore) Mustaqim Manzur | 1 | 0 | 0 | 0 | 0 | 0 | 1 | 0 |
| 8 | DF | (Singapore) Syed Thaha | 3 | 0 | 0 | 0 | 0 | 0 | 3 | 0 |
| 9 | FW | (Singapore) Shawal Anuar | 0 | 0 | 0 | 0 | 1 | 0 | 1 | 0 |
| 10 | MF | (Japan) Tatsuro Inui | 2 | 0 | 0 | 0 | 0 | 0 | 2 | 0 |
| 11 | MF | (Singapore) Hafiz Nor | 2 | 0 | 1 | 0 | 1 | 0 | 4 | 0 |
| 13 | GK | (Singapore) Farhan Amin | 0 | 0 | 0 | 0 | 0 | 0 | 0 | 0 |
| 14 | MF | (Singapore) Huzaifah Aziz | 2 | 0 | 0 | 0 | 0 | 0 | 2 | 0 |
| 15 | MF | (Singapore) Shah Hirul | 2 | 0 | 0 | 0 | 0 | 0 | 2 | 0 |
| 16 | DF | (Singapore) Hafiz Osman | 6 | 1 | 2 | 0 | 1 | 0 | 9 | 1 |
| 17 | FW | (Slovakia) Jozef Kaplan | 1 | 0 | 1 | 0 | 1 | 0 | 3 | 0 |
| 18 | GK | (Singapore) Yazid Yasin | 1 | 0 | 0 | 0 | 0 | 0 | 1 | 0 |
| 19 | FW | (Brazil) Bruno Castanheira | 0 | 0 | 0 | 0 | 0 | 0 | 0 | 0 |
| 20 | MF | (Singapore) Nor Azli Yusoff | 3 | 1 | 0 | 0 | 1 | 0 | 3 | 1 |

== Awards ==
=== Eagles Player of the Month Award ===
| Month | Player | Ref |
|---|---|---|
| March | (Slovakia) Jozef Kaplan | |
| April | (Singapore) Yazid Yasin | |
| May | (Brazil) Bruno Castanheira | |
| June | – | |
| July | – | |
| August | – | |
| September | – | |
| October | – | |
| Nov | (Japan) Yuki Ichikawa | |
