= 2017 Singapore National Football League =

Singapore National Football League in 2017

National Football League
- Season: 2017
- Dates: 22 April - 6 December 2017
- Champions: Yishun Sentek (Div 1); Gymkhana FC (Div 2)
- Promoted: Gymkhana FC (Div 2); South Avenue SC (Div 2)
- Top goalscorer: Zul Feshal (Div 1); Basit Hameed (Div 2)
- All statistics correct as of 22 Jan 2024.

The 2017 National Football League was the 43rd season of the Singapore National Football League (NFL). It commenced on 22 April 2017, featuring two matches between Eunos Crescent FC and GFA Sporting Westlake FC for Division 1, and Warwick Knights FC and Kembangan United FC for Division 2 at Jalan Besar Stadium.

On 6 December 2017, Yishun Sentek Mariners FC won NFL Division One champions after the match against Katong FC with a score of 3-0.

The Division One champions walked away with an NFL trophy and $15,000 in prize money, while runners-up Safsa took home $9,000.

Mr. S. Thavaneson, Vice-President of FAS, attended Jalan Besar Stadium to present prizes to the award winners from NFL Division One and Two.

On 19 December 2017, NFL Division 2 side Warwick Knights were expelled from the league by the FAS independent disciplinary committee (DC) for fielding two unregistered players in their match against Gymkhana FC on 11 November 2017. The FAS received Warwick Knights FC's official appeal on 29 December 2017. The FAS Appeals Committee upheld the decision of the DC. The results of all Warwick Knights' matches played in the 2017 tournament will be nullified.

== Division 1 League table ==
Pos	Team	Pld	W	D	L	GF	GA	GD	Pts	Qualification or relegation
1	Yishun Sentek Mariners (C)	22	20	0	2	85	22	+63	60	
2	SAFSA	22	18	3	1	77	18	+59	57	
3	Balestier United	22	14	2	6	45	28	+17	44	
4	Tiong Bahru FC	22	13	1	8	51	26	+25	40	
5	Siglap FC	22	6	8	8	28	40	−12	26	
6	Eunos Crescent	22	8	2	12	38	60	−22	26	
7	Admiralty FC	22	6	5	11	29	51	−22	23	
8	Police SA	22	5	7	10	42	55	−13	22	
9	GFA Sporting Westlake FC	22	6	4	12	42	59	−17	22	
10	Katong FC	22	5	6	11	25	49	−24	21	
11	Bishan Barx FC	22	6	3	13	28	53	−25	21	Relegation to 2018 NFL Division 2
12	Singapore Cricket Club	22	2	5	15	20	49	−29	11	Relegation to 2018 NFL Division 2

Source: FAS & FB NFL
Rules for classification: 1) points; 2) goal difference; 3) number of goals scored; 4) number of wins
(C) Champions

== Division 2 League table ==
As of 6 December 2017

Pos	Team	Pld	W	D	L	GF	GA	GD	Pts	Qualification or relegation
1	Gymkhana FC (C, P)	20	14	4	2	66	21	+45	46	Promotion to 2018 NFL Division 1
2	South Avenue SC (P)	20	15	1	4	70	34	+36	46	Promotion to 2018 NFL Division 1
3	Jungfrau Punggol FC	20	13	4	3	50	32	+18	43	
4	Singapore Khalsa Association	20	10	3	7	37	36	+1	33	
5	Kaki Bukit SC	20	9	2	9	32	24	+8	29	
6	GFA Victoria FC	20	7	7	6	41	30	+11	28	
7	Warwick Knights (Note: Warwick Knights were expelled from the league by the FAS DC for fielding two unregistered players for their match against Gymkhana FC on 11 Nov 2017. The results of all Warwick Knights' matches played in the 2017 tournament will be nullified.) (N)	20	7	3	10	35	35	0	24	
8	Admiralty CSC	20	6	1	13	26	42	−16	19	
9	Kembangan United	20	5	4	11	27	44	−17	19	
10	Starlight Soccerites Football Club	20	5	1	14	30	54	−24	16	
11	Academy Junior Football	20	3	2	15	18	80	−62	11	

Source: FAS
Rules for classification: 1) points; 2) goal difference; 3) number of goals scored; 4) number of wins
(C) Champions; (N) Nullified; (P) Promoted

== Awards ==
FAS Vice-President Mr S. Thavaneson was present at Jalan Besar Stadium to give out the prizes to the award winners from NFL Division One and Two.

=== NFL Division One Award Winners ===
- Champions – Yishun Sentek Mariners FC
- First runners-up – SAFSA
- Second runners-up – Balestier United RC
- Fair Play Award – Tiong Bahru FC
- Top Goal scorer – Zul Feshal (Yishun Sentek Mariners FC)

=== NFL Division Two Award Winners ===
- Champions – Gymkhana FC
- First runners-up – South Avenue SC
- Second runners-up – Jungfrau Punggol FC
- Fair Play Award – Admiralty CSC
- Top Goal scorer – Basit Hameed (South Avenue SC)

=== FAS Nite 2017 ===
The Football Association of Singapore (FAS) celebrated 125 years of Singapore football at the FAS Nite 2017 at Marina Bay Sands on 27 November 2017. Awards were given out to outstanding individuals and clubs from the National Football League (NFL), Women's Premier and National Leagues and S.League. Nine individuals also received FAS Awards to recognise their contributions to FAS and Singapore football.

The following players were given the Special Recognition Award:

- Zairi Ahmari, GFA Sporting Westlake FC
- Abdul Latif Bin Mohamed Noor, GFA Sporting Westlake FC
- Arriola Bueneventura, Starlight Soccerities FC
- Moklas Marof, Kembangan United SC
