= Razali Rashid =

Singaporean footballer

Personal information
- Place of birth: Singapore
- Position: Forward

Senior career*
Years	Team	Apps	(Gls)
????-1984	Farrer Park United		
1984-????	Police Sports Association		

International career
1982–1993	Singapore	25	(3)
- * Club domestic league appearances and goals

Razali Rashid is a Singaporean football forward who played for Singapore in the 1984 Asian Cup. He also played for Farrer Park United. He played for Kelantan and Sarawak

Razali left Farrer Park United and joined Police Sports Association in 1984 as he was enlisted for National service in Singapore.

In 1988, Razali turned down playing for Singapore FA in the Malaysia Cup as he wanted to play for Kelantan F.C. instead. Football Association of Singapore refused to release him and Razali remained clubless for a year. The following year, Jita Singh, coach of the Singapore national football team, recalled him to the national team which he accepted.
