= Farrer Park United =

Former amateur football club in Singapore

- Founded: 1968; 58 years ago as Hampshire United
- Ground: Farrer Park Field
- Capacity: 1000
- Coordinates: 1.3110°N 103.8495°E
- League: Singapore Football League

Farrer Park United was a soccer club from Singapore. The team won Singapore's National Football League (NFL) in 1982, and the President's Cup in 1981 and 1983.

The club played at the Farrer Park Field as their home stadium.

== History ==
In 1968, Hampshire United was formed. Hampshire United were promoted from the Football Association of Singapore (FAS) League Divison Three to Division Two in 1971 They changed their name to Hampshire Sports Club in 1972,, and finished second in Division Two in 1974.

The club was later renamed as Farrer Park United. The club were still called Hampshire SC in December 1974. They were one of the 10 clubs selected by the FAS for Division One of the inaugural National Football League in 1975. To meet the FAS's requirement that clubs' names be based on a constituency or district, they changed their name to Farrer Park United.

In 1976, Farrer Park lost to Geylang International, 2–0, in the finals of the Toto League Cup.

In 1979, Robert Ng and Robert Lim joined the club as manager and coach.

In 1982, Farrer Park United won the National Football League Division 1 and also the national U15 title.

In 1983, Dutch goalkeeper, Alex Brouwer, formerly from PSV Eindhoven join the club. The club won the President's Cup with a 3–0 win over Singapore Armed Forces Sports Association.

In 1989, before an NFL match against Changi United, the team showed up without jerseys. Their manager Alfonso Dorai arrived 15 minutes after the match's scheduled start with their jerseys but the club had alreader conceded the match to Changi United. Dorai claimed that he was involved in an accident in his friend's car and was delayed. Football Association of Singapore (FAS) requested for a police report for the accident which Dorai was unable to produce, claiming his friend had privately settled with the other driver and hence no police report was made. As a result, Farrer Park was banned for two years by the FAS.

== Sponsor ==
In 1978, Farrer Park got its first sponsor, German sporting supplier Puma, to provide for all its equipment.

== Players ==
The club also had the only British player, Chris Bates, playing in the National Football League.

The team had also many other Singaporean national football players, such as Malek Awab, Norhalis Shafik, Marzuki Elias and Razali Rashid.
