= 2018 Singapore National Football League =

National Football League
- Season: 2018
- Champions: Div 1: Tiong Bahru; Div 2: Singapore Khalsa
- Promoted: Singapore Khalsa (Div 2); Warwick Knights (Div 2)
- Matches: 93
- Goals: 321 (3.45 per match)
- All statistics correct as of 29 July 2018.

The 2018 National Football League (also known as the Aminovital National Football League) is the 44th season of the National Football League (NFL).

The 2018 NFL season was officially launched on 29 April 2018 at Jalan Besar Stadium. NFL Division Two sides Jungfrau Punggol FC and Singapore Khalsa Association completed their season opener with a 2-2 draw before an opening ceremony. Defending NFL Division One champions Yishun Sentek Mariners FC won the inaugural NFL Challenge Cup after beating 2017 NFL runners-up Singapore Armed Forces Sports Association (SAFSA) by a 5-3 score-line.

Academy Junior Football was renamed to Bukit Timah Juniors FC in compliance with FAS regulation.

Gymkhana FC was expelled from the NFL in December 2018 as they were unable to field 11 players at the point of kick-off on three separate occasions in the course of the competition.

Tiong Bahru FC was officially named National Football League (NFL) Division One champions on 28 October 2018 after their final match against SAFSA at Jalan Besar Stadium, finishing the season unbeaten.

== NFL Challenge Cup ==
29 April 2018	Yishun Sentek Mariners	5-3	SAFSA	Jalan Besar, Singapore
19:45 UTC+8				Stadium: Jalan Besar Stadium

== Division 1 League table ==
Pos	Team	Pld	W	D	L	GF	GA	GD	Pts	Qualification or relegation
1	Tiong Bahru (C)	18	16	2	0	59	11	+48	50	
2	Balestier United RC	18	12	1	5	39	20	+19	37	
3	SAFSA	18	11	2	5	61	27	+34	35	
4	Yishun Sentek Mariners	18	13	1	4	57	26	+31	40	
5	GFA Sporting Westlake	18	8	3	7	28	29	−1	27	
6	Katong FC	18	5	4	9	21	30	−9	19	
7	Police SA	18	6	0	12	33	51	−18	18	
8	Eunos Crescent	18	3	4	11	21	40	−19	13	
9	South Avenue	18	3	2	13	20	62	−42	11	Relegation to NFL Division 2
10	Admiralty FC	18	3	1	14	12	55	−43	10	Relegation to NFL Division 2

Updated to match(es) played on 1 October 2018. Source: FAS
Rules for classification: 1) points; 2) goal difference; 3) number of goals scored; 4) number of wins
(C) Champions

== Division 2 League table ==
Pos	Team	Pld	W	D	L	GF	GA	GD	Pts	Qualification or relegation
1	Singapore Khalsa Association (C)	20	16	2	2	65	25	+40	50	Promotion to NFL Division 1 2019
2	Warwick Knights	20	14	4	2	54	18	+36	46	Promotion to NFL Division 1 2019
3	Jungfrau Punggol	20	13	1	6	75	34	+41	40	
4	GFA Victoria	20	10	7	3	40	28	+12	37	
5	Kaki Bukit SC	20	11	2	7	37	25	+12	35	
6	Singapore Cricket Club	20	9	3	8	40	19	+21	30	
7	Kembangan United	20	7	3	10	33	32	+1	24	
8	Admiralty CSC	20	5	8	7	32	32	0	23	
9	Starlight Soccerites	20	5	2	13	32	60	−28	17	
10	Bishan Brax	20	2	2	16	11	54	−43	8	
11	Bukit Timah Juniors	20	0	2	18	7	99	−92	2	Relegation to FAS Island Wide League 2019

Updated to match(es) played on 1 October 2018. Source: FAS
Rules for classification: 1) points; 2) goal difference; 3) number of goals scored; 4) number of wins
(C) Champions

== Awards ==
=== FAS Nite 2018 ===
The Football Association of Singapore recognises the outstanding performances of the individuals and club with the FAS Nite 2018 on 13 October 2018.

==== NFL Division One Award Winners ====
- Coach of the Year

Robert Eziakor, Tiong Bahru FC

- Young Player of the Year

Aminshafie Sa'ad, GFC Sporting Westlake FC

- Player of the Year

Zulkiffli Hassim, Yishun Sentek Mariners FC

==== NFL Division Two Award Winners ====
- Coach of the Year

Sudiat Dali, Admiralty CSC

- Young Player of the Year

Shahrukh Faizal, Singapore Khalsa Association

- Player of the Year

Rashpal Singh, Singapore Khalsa Association
