= Marzuki Elias =

Singaporean footballer

Personal information
- Place of birth: Singapore
- Positions: Left-back; centre-back

International career
Years	Team	Apps	(Gls)
- Singapore

Marzuki Elias is a Singaporean footballer who played as a left-back for the Singapore national team in the 1984 Asian Cup.

He used to play for Farrer Park United.
