= Lau Meng Meng =

Singaporean footballer

Isaac Lau Meng Meng
Personal information
- Date of birth: 29 May 1983 (age 43)
- Place of birth: Singapore
- Height: 1.70 m (5 ft 7 in)
- Position: Defender

Team information
- Current team: Eunos Crescent FC

Senior career*
| Years | Team | Apps | (Gls) |
| 2007–2008 | Geylang United | | |
| 2009–2015 | Hougang United | 48 | (0) |
| 2017– | Eunos Crescent FC | | |
- * Club domestic league appearances and goals

Lau Meng Meng (born 29 May 1983) is a Singaporean footballer.

He is a former Geylang United player and also played for Hougang United FC in the S. League.
