= 2019 Singapore National Football League =

National Football League
- Season: 2019
- Champions: Div 1: Tiong Bahru; Div 2: Project Vaults Oxley
- Promoted: Project Vaults Oxley (Div 2); Siglap FC (Div 2)
- Top goalscorer: Div 1: Zamri Kamal (Warwick); Div 2: Zul Feshal (PVO SC)

The 2019 National Football League (also known as the Aminovital National Football League) is the 45th season of the National Football League, it might be the first year that this league will have promotion to the top-flight Singaporean professional league for association football clubs, the Singapore Premier League.

The 2019 season kicks off with the NFL Challenge Cup between Yishun Sentek Mariners and Tiong Bahru FC on 17 March 2019 at Jalan Besar Stadium. Yishun Sentek Mariners retains the cup with a 3-2 win over Tiong Bahru FC.

== NFL Challenge Cup ==
17 March 2019	Yishun Sentek Mariners	3-2	Tiong Bahru FC	Singapore
19:30 UTC+8	Zulkifli Suzliman 12'; Azhar Sairudin 28' (pen.); Ridho Jafri 57'	Report	Liam Shotton 18'; Hazim Faiz 83'	Stadium: Jalan Besar Stadium

== Division 1 ==
Pos	Team	Pld	W	D	L	GF	GA	GD	Pts	Qualification
1	Tiong Bahru (C)	13	9	2	2	46	17	+29	29	
2	GFA Sporting Westlake	13	7	5	1	36	14	+22	26	
3	Singapore Armed Forces	13	6	6	1	27	10	+17	24	
4	Katong	13	6	4	3	23	13	+10	22	
5	Warwick Knights	13	6	3	4	40	21	+19	21	
6	Singapore Khalsa	13	6	2	5	29	21	+8	20	
7	Yishun Sentek Mariners	13	4	5	4	25	16	+9	17 (Note: Match No.1 was awarded to Tiong Bahru FC with a score of 3–0)	
8	Police SA	13	4	3	6	30	27	+3	15	Relegated to 2020 NFL Division Two
9	Balestier United RC	13	2	0	11	11	69	−58	6	Relegated to 2020 NFL Division Two
10	Eunos Crescent	13	0	0	13	7	66	−59	0 (Note: Match No.5 was awarded to Police SA with a score of 3–0)	Relegated to 2020 NFL Division Two

Source: fas.org.sg
Rules for classification: 1) points; 2) goal difference; 3) number of goals scored; 4) number of wins
(C) Champions

=== FAS Nite 2019 ===
Award	Nominee	Club	Recipient
Player of the Year	Aloysius Yap	Singapore Armed Forces SA	Liam Shotton
Player of the Year	Liam Shotton	Tiong Bahru FC	Liam Shotton
Player of the Year	Shuri Uchida	GFA Sporting Westlake FC	Liam Shotton
Young Player of the Year	Carman Koh	Singapore Khalsa Association	Danish Uwais
Young Player of the Year	Danish Uwais	Tiong Bahru FC	Danish Uwais
Young Player of the Year	Nasrul Talib	Singapore Armed Forces SA	Danish Uwais
Coach of the Year	Kevin Wee	Singapore Armed Forces SA	Robert Eziakor
Coach of the Year	Sukhvinder Singh	Singapore Khalsa Association	Robert Eziakor
Coach of the Year	Robert Eziakor	Tiong Bahru FC	Robert Eziakor
Top scorer		Warwick Knights FC	Zamri Kamal
Fair Play Award			Katong FC

Source: fas.org.sg

== Division 2 ==
=== Top tier ===
Pos	Team	Pld	W	D	L	GF	GA	GD	Pts	Promotion
1	Project Vaults Oxley (C, P)	15	10	2	3	50	21	+29	32	Promoted to 2020 NFL Division One
2	Siglap (P)	15	9	3	3	28	14	+14	30	Promoted to 2020 NFL Division One
3	Jungfrau Punggol	15	8	4	3	29	20	+9	28	
4	Singapore Cricket Club	15	8	2	5	32	24	+8	26	
5	Admiralty CSC	15	5	4	6	24	27	−3	19	
6	Starlight Soccerites	15	4	4	7	26	48	−22	16	

Source: fas.org.sg
(C) Champions; (P) Promoted

=== Bottom tier ===
Pos	Team	Pld	W	D	L	GF	GA	GD	Pts	Relegation
1	Bishan Barx	14	5	4	5	29	29	0	19	
2	South Avenue	14	4	3	7	24	34	−10	15	
3	Admiralty FC (R)	14	4	2	8	20	25	−5	14	Relegated to 2020 IWL
4	Kaki Bukit (R)	14	3	4	7	17	25	−8	13	Relegated to 2020 IWL
5	GFA Victoria (R)	14	3	2	9	17	29	−12	11 (Note: Match 6 was awarded 3–0 to GFA Victoria due to fielding of an ineligible player by Kaki Bukit.)	Relegated to 2020 IWL

Source: fas.org.sg
(R) Relegated

=== FAS Nite 2019 ===
Award	Nominee	Club	Recipient
Player of the Year	Chang Guo Guang	Singapore Cricket Club	Jonathan Xu
Player of the Year	Guntur Djafril	Siglap FC	Jonathan Xu
Player of the Year	Jonathan Xu	Project Vaults Oxley SC	Jonathan Xu
Young Player of the Year	Dylan Pereira	GFA Victoria FC	Sadik Said
Young Player of the Year	Sadik Said	Jungfrau Punggol FC	Sadik Said
Young Player of the Year	Salihin Rosdi	Bishan Barx FC	Sadik Said
Coach of the Year	Ashraf Ariffin	Siglap FC	Ashraf Ariffin
Coach of the Year	Sudiat Dali	Admiralty CSC	Ashraf Ariffin
Coach of the Year	Amos Boon	Singapore Cricket Club	Ashraf Ariffin
Top scorer		Project Vaults Oxley SC	Zul Feshal
Fair Play Award			Singapore Cricket Club

Source: fas.org.sg
