= Aly Camara =

Guinean footballer (born 1986)

Personal information
- Full name: Aly Camara
- Date of birth: February 8, 1986 (age 40)
- Place of birth: Conakry, Guinea
- Height: 1.78 m (5 ft 10 in)
- Position: Striker

Youth career
- 1990–1995: AC Gbessia
- 1996–1999: Olympique Marseille
- 2000–2001: Real de Bonfi

Senior career*
Years	Team	Apps	(Gls)
2001–2002	AS Kaloum Star	nonthaburi fc 2011	
2003	SAFFC	bontang fc 2012 Indonésie 1er league	
2004	PSIM Yogyakarta	chanthaburi fc 2014	
2004–2005	Bangpra FC	lopburi fc 2015	
2006–2008	Royal Thai Army	shan united 2016	
2009	TTM Samut Sakhon		

International career
2001–2002	Guinea U17		
- * Club domestic league appearances and goals as of 14 November 2008

Aly Camara (born 8 February 1986 in Conakry) is a Guinean former footballer.
