= Zulkiffli Hassim =

Singaporean footballer

Personal information
- Full name: Muhammad Zulkiffli bin Hassim
- Date of birth: 26 March 1986 (age 40)
- Place of birth: Singapore
- Height: 1.72 m (5 ft 7 1/2 in)
- Position: Forward

Team information
- Current team: Yishun Sentek Mariners
- Number: 12

Youth career
- 2007: Woodlands Wellington
- 2009: Gombak United

Senior career*
Years	Team	Apps	(Gls)
2009–2011	Gombak United	57	(7)
2012–2016	Balestier Khalsa	76	(13)
2017	Yishun Sentek Mariners		
2019	Warriors F.C.	9	(2)
2020	Tanjong Pagar United	8	(0)
2022–	Yishun Sentek Mariners		
- * Club domestic league appearances and goals as of 12:02, 28 August 2015 (UTC)

Zulkiffli Hassim (born 26 March 1986) is a Singaporean professional footballer who currently plays for Yishun Sentek Mariners. He plays as a forward.

== Career ==
=== Gombak United ===
Zulkiffli played for Woodlands Wellington and Gombak United reserve teams in the Prime League in his early days. In late 2009, Zulkiffli was called up to play for the Bulls' first team in the S.League and became a regular in 2010 and 2011.

=== Balestier Khalsa ===
However, as Gombak United had plans to sit out of the S.League from 2013 onwards due to lack of financial resources, Zulkiffli joined Balestier Khalsa in 2012 and has remained with the Tigers since then.

Zulkiffli suffered one of his grey periods in the footballing career as he was handed a five-match ban and a suspended fine for making offensive remarks against Woodlands Wellington defender Fabien Lewis. Zulkiffli had clashed with Lewis when their respective teams met at Toa Payoh Stadium for a S.League fixture on 18 March 2012, which ended 2–0 in favour of the Tigers. It was concluded that Hassim made "remarks of an offensive and racist nature" to Lewis, a Trinidadian of African descent.

=== Yishun Sentek Mariners FC ===
He signed for Yishun Sentek Mariners FC after being released by the Tigers.

== Honours ==
Balestier Khalsa

- Singapore Cup: 2014
- League Cup: 2013

Yishun Sentek Mariners

- National Football League Division 1: 2017
