= Cairnhill FC =

Singaporean football club

- Full name: Cairnhill Football Club
- League: Singapore National Football League

Cairnhill Football Club is a former Singapore football club which competed in the Singapore National Football League in the 1980s. The club won the Division 3 title in 1975 and the Division 2 title in 1982.

In 1981, Cairnhill reached the quarterfinals of the President's Cup.
