= Decha Phetakua =

Thai footballer (born 1983)

Personal information
- Full name: Decha Phetakua
- Date of birth: 30 January 1983 (age 43)
- Place of birth: Nakhon Ratchasima, Thailand
- Height: 1.73 m (5 ft 8 in)
- Position: Defender

Senior career*
Years	Team	Apps	(Gls)
2009	Bangkok Glass	4	(0)
2010–2012	PTT Rayong	39	(4)
2013–2014	Police United	5	(0)
2015–2017	Angthong	31	(3)
- * Club domestic league appearances and goals

Decha Phetakua (Thai: เดชา เพชรตะกั่ว; born January 30, 1983) is a retired professional footballer from Thailand. before moving to PTT Rayong.
