= Tanat Wongsuparak =

Thai footballer (born 1985)

Personal information
- Full name: Tanat Wongsuparak
- Date of birth: 19 February 1985 (age 41)
- Place of birth: Satun, Thailand
- Height: 1.64 m (5 ft 4 1/2 in)
- Position: Midfielder

Team information
- Current team: Dome
- Number: 4

Senior career*
Years	Team	Apps	(Gls)
2008	BEC Tero Sasana	16	(0)
2008–2010	Bangkok Glass	48	(11)
2010	→ Bangkok United (loan)	1	(1)
2011	TTM Phichit	5	(0)
2011–2013	Police United	2	(1)
2014	Air Force Central	6	(0)
2015–2017	Angthong	29	(4)
2017–2019	Thai Honda	26	(3)
2020	Rajpracha	2	(0)
2020	Uthai Thani	11	(1)
2021–2023	North Bangkok University	55	(12)
2023–2024	Samut Prakan City	17	(0)
2024–	Dome	0	(0)
- * Club domestic league appearances and goals as of 14 November 2023

Tanat Wongsuparak (Thai: ธนัตถ์ วงศ์ศุภลักษณ์; born 19 February 1985) is a Thai professional footballer who plays for Thai League 3 club Dome.

He played for Krung Thai Bank FC (later Bangkok Glass) in the 2008 AFC Champions League group stage.
