= Wellington football club =

Wellington Football Club may refer to:

== Association football ==
- The original name of Woodlands Wellington FC, a professional club based in Singapore, which was used between 1988 and 1995
- Wellington Phoenix FC, a professional club based in Wellington, New Zealand
- University-Mount Wellington, a club in Auckland, New Zealand
- North Wellington AFC, an amateur club based in the northern suburbs of Wellington, New Zealand
- Wellington United, based in Wellington, New Zealand
- Wellington Marist, based in Wellington, New Zealand
- Wellington Olympic AFC, a semi-professional club in Wellington, New Zealand
- Wellington A.F.C., a football club based in Wellington, Somerset, England
- Wellington F.C. (Herefords), based in the village of Wellington, Herefordshire, England
- Wellington People F.C., based in Wellington, Sierra Leone
- Wellington Recreation F.C. (also known as Wellington Rec.), based in Larne, County Antrim, Northern Ireland
- Wellington Town F.C., the former name of Telford United F.C.
- Team Wellington, a New Zealand semi-professional football club

== Rugby union ==
- Wellington FC, the longest continuous playing rugby union club in New Zealand; see Wellington Rugby Football Union
- Mt Wellington RFC, based in Auckland, New Zealand
