= Metee Pungpoh =

Thai footballer

Personal information
- Full name: Metee Pungpoh
- Date of birth: 12 February 1984 (age 42)
- Place of birth: Khon Kaen, Thailand
- Height: 1.73 m (5 ft 8 in)
- Position: Striker

Team information
- Current team: Ayutthaya United
- Number: 10

Senior career*
Years	Team	Apps	(Gls)
2006–2008	Krung Thai Bank FC		
2009	Bangkok Glass		
2010	Chiangrai United		
2010	Chanthaburi		
2011	Chiangmai		
2012	Paknampho NSRU		
2013	Prachuap		
2014	Globlex TWD		
2014	Nakhon Si Heritage		
2015	Lampang		
2016	Samut Sakhon		
2017–	Ayutthaya United		
- * Club domestic league appearances and goals as of 14 November 2008

Maytee Pungpoh (Thai: เมธี ปุ้งโพธิ์) is a Thai professional footballer who currently plays for Ayutthaya United in the Thai League 3.

He played for Krung Thai Bank FC in the 2008 AFC Champions League group stages.

== Asian Champions League Appearances ==
#	Date	Venue	Opponent	Score	Result
1.	April 9, 2008	Bangkok, Thailand	Nam Dinh	9-1	Won
2.	April 23, 2008	Hanoi, Vietnam	Nam Dinh	2-2	Draw
