= Supphakorn Ramkulabsuk =

Thai footballer (born 1989)

Personal information
- Full name: Supphakorn Ramkulabsuk
- Date of birth: 19 October 1989 (age 37)
- Place of birth: Ayutthaya, Thailand
- Height: 1.82 m (5 ft 11 1/2 in)
- Position: Striker

Senior career*
Years	Team	Apps	(Gls)
2005–2010	TTM Phichit		
2011	Chamchuri United		
2012	TTM Chiangmai		
2013	Air Force Central	23	(13)
2014	BBCU		
2015	Army United	1	(0)

International career
2007	Thailand U19		
- * Club domestic league appearances and goals as of 14 November 2008

Supphakorn Ramkulabsuk (Thai: ศุภกร รามกุหลาบสุข; born October 19, 1989) is a Thai professional footballer who plays as a striker.

== Honours ==
Air Force Central

- Thai Division 1 League: 2013
