= Jonathan Xu =

Singaporean footballer

Personal information
- Full name: Jonathan Adam Xu Wei Hua
- Date of birth: 7 September 1983 (age 43)
- Place of birth: Singapore
- Height: 1.80 m (5 ft 11 in)
- Position: Midfielder

Team information
- Current team: Project Vaults Oxley SC
- Number: 13

Senior career*
Years	Team	Apps	(Gls)
2009–2011	Geylang International	55	(0)
2012	Tanjong Pagar	25	(0)
2013	Admiralty FC	4	(1)
2014–2015	Balestier Khalsa	57	(2)
2016–2017	Eunos Crescent		
2018–	Project Vault Oxley SC		
Medal record
2014 Singapore Cup Winner (Balestier Khalsa FC) 2018 FAS Islandwide League Champion (PVOSC) 2018 IWL Golden Boot 2019 National Football League Div 2 Champion (PVOSC) 2019 National Football League Div 2 Player of the Year
- * Club domestic league appearances and goals as of 17 February 2023

Jonathan Xu (born 7 September 1983) is a Singaporean footballer who plays for Project Vaults Oxley SC as a midfielder.

== Club career ==
=== Geylang International ===
Xu started his footballing career in 2009 when he signed for Geylang International.

=== Tanjong Pagar United ===
In 2010, it was announced that Xu would join Tanjong Pagar ahead of the 2011 S.League season.

=== Admiralty FC ===
After 2 years at Tanjong Pagar, Xu joined Admiralty FC in 2013 and he played in the NFL, division 1.

=== Balestier Khalsa ===
Xu returned to the S.League in 2014, where he joined Balestier Khalsa, winning the Singapore Cup that year and earning a contract extension. He also won the runners up for the League Cup with the team. He made history scoring his career first goal in the AFC Cup against East Bengal. It was also the club's first ever goal in the tournament, and the Tigers won 2–1 in that match, which was also their first AFC Cup victory. On 7 August 2015, he scored his only goal in the S. League against Hougang United and this goal was nominated for the goal of the season.

=== Eunos Crescent ===
Xu once again returned to the NFL in 2016. He joined Eunos Crescent where he became the captain, scored many goals and won the league with the team.

== Honours ==
=== Club ===
Geylang United

- Singapore Cup: 2009

Balestier Khalsa

- Singapore Cup: 2014
- League Cup: 2015 (Runners up)

Eunos Crescent

- National Football League, Division 1: 2016
