= Sarun Promkaew =

Thai footballer

Personal information
- Full name: Sarun Promkaew
- Date of birth: February 15, 1982 (age 44)
- Place of birth: Nong Khai, Thailand
- Height: 1.72 m (5 ft 7 1/2 in)
- Positions: Striker; right midfielder; right back

Senior career*
Years	Team	Apps	(Gls)
2001–2008	Krung Thai Bank	134	(14)
2009–2012	Bangkok Glass	86	(21)
2012–2015	Chiangrai United	37	(2)
2016	Chiangmai	12	(0)
Total		269	(37)
- * Club domestic league appearances and goals as of 14 November 2008

Sarun Promkaew (Thai: ศรัณย์ พรมแก้ว, born February 15, 1982), simply known as Run (Thai: รัน), is a retired professional footballer from Thailand. He played for Krung Thai Bank FC in the 2008 AFC Champions League group stages.

== Honours ==
=== Club ===
Krung Thai Bank

- Thai Premier League Champions (2) : 2002-03, 2003-04
- Kor Royal Cup Winners (2) : 2003, 2004
