= Wachira Sangsri =

Thai footballer (born 1986)

Personal information
- Full name: Wachira Sangsri
- Date of birth: May 8, 1987 (age 39)
- Place of birth: Bangkok, Thailand
- Height: 1.73 m (5 ft 8 in)
- Position: Defender

Team information
- Current team: Phichit
- Number: 5

Senior career*
Years	Team	Apps	(Gls)
2008–2010	Bangkok Glass		
2011–2012	Samut Songkhram		
2011	→ Raj-Vithi (loan)		
2013	Air Force United		
2013	Bangkok Christian College		
2014	Krabi		
2014	Rayong		
2015–	Phichit		
- * Club domestic league appearances and goals as of 14 November 2008

Wachira Sangsri (Thai: วชิระ แสงศรี, born March 14, 1986) is a Thai professional footballer who currently plays for Phichit in the Thai Division 1 League.
