= Yishun Mariners FC =

Singaporean football club

Yishun Mariners
- Full name: Yishun Mariners Football Club
- Nickname: The Sea Eagles
- Founded: 1975; 51 years ago
- Ground: Yishun Stadium
- Capacity: 3,400
- Head coach: Hairi Su'ap
- League: Singapore Football League
- 2025: League 1, 8th of 8
- Website: yishun-mariners.com

The Yishun Mariners Football Club formerly known as Yishun Sentek Mariners Football Club is a semi-professional football club based in Yishun, Singapore, currently playing in the Singapore Football League (SFL) Division 2.

Founded in 1975, the club have won the Singapore FA Cup, Singapore National Football League 1 and 2 titles once each.

== History ==
The club was founded in 1975.

=== 2014: Promotion to Division Two ===
The club was promoted to the NFL Division One after winning NFL Division Two in 2014.

In 2016, then Yakob Hashim, the coach of Yishun Sentek Mariners, had expressed his unhappiness at the lack of financial support the semi-professional leagues received.

=== 2017: Division One champion ===
The 2017 season will be sponsored by Ajinomoto Pte Ltd, making it the firestseason which is to be sponsored by a Japanese Company.

On 6 December 2017, Yishun Sentek Mariners were crowned NFL Division One champion, winning their first Division One title. They secure their title after being awarded a walkover for their match against Katong in Jalan Besar. Zul Fesha finished the season as the League 1 top goalscorer.

==== Brawl with Singapore Armed Forces Sports Association ====
On 12 November 2017, a mass brawl broke out during a National Football League (NFL) match against Singapore Armed Forces Sports Association (SAFSA). The incident happened during the add-on time in the second half when Zulfadhli Suzliman was sent off with SAFSA leading 3–2. The match was streamed “live” over the FAS social-media channel. Yishun Sentek coach, Yakob Hashim mentioned that he was told that Nazirul Islam (from SAFSA) had verbally abused Zulfadhli's mother. This sparked Zulfadhli to retaliate with a kick, which led to his red card.

On 30 January 2018, the club have been fined S$5,000 and hit with a five-point penalty by the Football Association of Singapore. The club could also face further sanctions, an additional S$5,000 fine and five-point penalty if they get into any more disciplinary problems. Eight Yishun players were also handed fines of between S$300 to S$1,000, and suspensions ranging from 4 to 15 months.

=== 2018–2019: FA Cup and NFL Challenge Cups winner ===
On 18 November 2018, Yishun Sentek Mariners defeated Tiong Bahru 3–1 to clinch the 2018 Singapore FA Cup title. 2018 NFL Division One top goalscorer, Zulkiffli Hassim scored in the Final and was the FA Cup joint-top scorer. The club completed the double after winning the NFL Challenge Cup in the beginning of the 2018 season.

In 2019, the club retained the NFL Challenge Cup title, defeating Tiong Bahru 3–2. They became the only winners of NFL Challenge Cup after winning two consecutive finals in 2018 and 2019.

=== 2025: Relegation to League 1 ===
In 2025, Yishun Sentek Mariners was relegated to 2026-27 Singapore Football League 2 (SFL2) after finishing bottom of League 1 (SFL1).

On 15 January 2026, Yishun Sentek Mariners Football Club was officially renamed to Yishun Mariners Football Club.

== Sponsors ==
Kit Supplier	Main Sponsors	Joint Sponsors
(Indonesia) D&Em Apparel	—N/a	(Singapore) Agent Azhar Sulaiman (Singapore) A4 International (Singapore) Hombre (Singapore) SHUKRI Wealth Management (Singapore) TILT (Singapore) WKHZ Transport (Singapore) Mumtaz Holidays & Tours Pte. Ltd.

== Head coaches ==
- Yakob Hashim (2012–2017)
- Hairi Su'ap (2023-present)

== Players ==
2024 Squad

Note: Flags indicate national team as defined under FIFA eligibility rules; some limited exceptions apply. Players may hold more than one non-FIFA nationality.

No.	Pos.	Nation	Player
1	GK	SGP	Fairol Abdullah
2	DF	SGP	Dylan Chia
3	DF	SGP	Solehin Rosman
3	MF	SGP	Jorazly Darin
5	DF	SGP	Asyidiq Sukarto
6	MF	SGP	Syahiran Miswan
7	MF	SGP	Shamsurin Rahman
8	MF	SGP	Rusyaidi Salime
10	MF	SGP	Ridho Jafri
11	MF	SGP	Fazli Jaffar
12	FW	SGP	Zulkiffli Hassim
13	GK	SGP	Nur Amin Malek
14	DF	SGP	Mirza Wahid
15	FW	SGP	Daniel Haarits
16	MF	SGP	Raihan Rahman

No.	Pos.	Nation	Player
17	FW	SGP	Farouq Farkhan
19	DF	SGP	Khyruddin Khalid
20	DF	SGP	Fazli Sulaiman
21	MF	SGP	Firdaus Kasman
22	DF	SGP	He Rui Ren
23	DF	SGP	Hanafi Salleh
24	DF	SGP	Hanafi Salleh
25	DF	SGP	Daniel Tan
26	FW	SGP	Rifqishah Guzarishah
27	GK	SGP	Haziq Roslan
29	DF	SGP	Azlan Razak
30	MF	SGP	Na'iim Ishak
37	DF	SGP	Azlan Razak
93	FW	SGP	Aiman Hafiz

Source: Yishun Sentek Mariners

2023 Squad

Note: Flags indicate national team as defined under FIFA eligibility rules; some limited exceptions apply. Players may hold more than one non-FIFA nationality.

No.	Pos.	Nation	Player
2	DF	SGP	Aimanizzan Sukarto
4	FW		Leonardo Rocha
5	DF	SGP	Asyidiq Sukarto
6	MF	SGP	Syahiran Miswan
7	MF	SGP	Shamsurin Rahman
8	MF	SGP	Na'iim Ishak
10	MF	SGP	Ridho Jafri
11	DF	SGP	Khyruddin Khalid
12	FW	SGP	Zulkiffli Hassim

No.	Pos.	Nation	Player
17	FW	SGP	Farouq Farkhan
19	FW	SGP	Dhamiri Zahid
25	GK	SGP	Fawwaz Anuar
27	DF	SGP	Solehin Rosman
28	MF	SGP	Ferianni Nasir
37	DF	SGP	Azlan Razak
93	FW	SGP	Aiman Hafiz
99	MF	SGP	Jerel Koh

== Current season ==
=== Singapore Football League 2 ===
Pos	Team	Pld	W	D	L	GF	GA	GD	Pts
1	Gymkhana Gaulois FC	4	4	0	0	28	3	+25	12
2	Frenz GDT Circuit FC	5	4	0	1	20	11	+9	12
3	Tanah Merah United	4	2	2	0	12	5	+7	8
4	Katong FC	4	2	1	1	5	5	0	7
5	GFA Victoria FC	4	2	0	2	5	12	−7	6
6	Warwick Knights FC	4	1	1	2	6	7	−1	4
7	Admiralty CSN	5	1	1	3	5	20	−15	4
8	Starlight Soccerites	5	1	0	4	8	12	−4	3
9	Kaki Bukit SC	4	1	0	3	5	13	−8	3
10	Yishun Mariners FC	3	0	1	2	4	10	−6	1

Updated to match(es) played on 1 November 2026. Source: Football Association of Singapore
Rules for classification: 1) points; 2) goal difference; 3) number of goals scored; 4) number of wins

== Achievements ==
=== League ===
- National Football League

Division 1 Champions: 2017
Division 2 Champions: 2014

=== Cup ===
- Singapore FA Cup

Champions (2): 2018, 2023
Runners-up (2): 2017, 2019

- NFL Challenge Cup

Champions (2): 2018, 2019

== Past seasons ==
=== Leagues ===
Season	League	Pos.	P	W	D	L	GS	GA	Pts
2017	NFL DIV 1	1st	22	20	0	2	85	22	60
2018	NFL DIV 1	4th	18	13	1	4	57	26	40
2019	NFL DIV 1	5th	5	1	3	1	4	4	6*
2022	SFL DIV 1	2nd	14	5	7	2	26	20	22
2023	SFL DIV 1	3rd	14	7	3	4	33	18	24
2024	SFL DIV 1	3rd	14	8	3	3	32	20	27
2025	SFL DIV 1	8th	14	2	2	10	21	33	8

=== Squad List ===
- 2023 Squad list
- 2024 Squad list
