= Tengku Mushadad =

Singaporean footballer and coach

Personal information
- Birth name: Tengku Mushadad bin Tengku Mohamed
- Date of birth: 7 August 1984 (age 42)
- Place of birth: Singapore
- Height: 1.78 m (5 ft 10 in)
- Positions: Midfielder; defender

Team information
- Current team: Eunos Crescent
- Number: 10

Senior career*
Years	Team	Apps	(Gls)
2003–2004	Home United	0	(0)
2005–2007	Young Lions	53	(1)
2008–2010	Home United	36	(2)
2011	Gombak United	33	(1)
2012–2013	Balestier Khalsa	60	(1)
2014	Tanjong Pagar United	2	(0)
2015–2016	Hougang United		
2016–	Eunos Crescent		

International career^{‡}
2004–	Singapore	8	(0)
- * Club domestic league appearances and goals as of 20 May 2009 ‡ National team caps and goals as of 20 May 2009

Tengku Mushadad bin Tengku Mohamed (born 7 August 1984) is a professional footballer who is playing for Tanjong Pagar United and the Singapore national football team. He is currently also a coach with a youth football academy in Singapore named JSSL.

He can play either as a defensive midfielder or as a defender.

== Club career ==
Tengku has previously played for S.League clubs Young Lions, Home United FC, Gombak United and Balestier Khalsa.

In 2017, Tengku signed for Eunos Crescent FC.

== International career ==
Tengku made his debut for the Singapore against Japan on 17 November 2004.

== Honours ==
=== International ===
Singapore

- ASEAN Football Championship: 2004
