= Eunos Crescent FC =

Singaporean football club

- Full name: Eunos Crescent Football Club
- Short name: ECFC
- Founded: 1975; 51 years ago
- Head Coach: Nurhaizal Sufri
- League: Island-Wide League
- 2026: 4th of 7 (Group C)
Home colours	Away colours

Eunos Crescent Football Club is an amateur Singaporean football club based in Eunos, that competes in the National Football League.

== History ==
The club was established in 1975. In 2006 they won Division Two of the National Football League, and were promoted to Division One.

In 2012, Eunos Crescent recruited former Tampines Rovers player, Akihiro Nakamura to the club who had appeared 125 times for them on a one-year contract.

In 2014, Eunos Crescent Women's team was crowned the champions of Women's Premier League with 38 points from 16 matches.

In 2016, the club won the National Football League Division One title. After winning the title, the club set their sight on promotion to the S.League, the country's professional league. Former Woodlands Wellington manager and veteran local football official R Vengadasalam was hired as the Director of Football, overseeing the club’s youth development and looking for sponsorships.

Venga brought in Samy’s Curry Restaurant and Lotto as sponsors and also recruited former national players Indra Sahdan, Precious Emuejeraye and Tengku Mushadad. Newly opened football, health and fitness facility, The Arena, become the club training training and home ground sponsor. The club would train at The Arena's fitness facilities and played their home games at The Arena.

Ahead of the 2017 season, the club receives a huge boost with a new sponsor, The Arena. Darwin Jalil, the president of the club, had earlier commented on the lack of financial support from the FAS. On 17 May 2017, the FAS announced that the club will play five of its remaining home matches at The Arena.

== Affiliated clubs ==
- (Netherlands) VVV-Venlo (2017)

In 2017, the club agreed a "long-term" partnership with Dutch club VVV-Venlo. The two clubs agreed to sign a Memorandum of Understanding when Venlo's head of academy Roger Bongaerts visited Singapore. Under the collaboration, Eunos Crescent will adopt training methods used by Venlo and sending youth players to train in the Netherlands.

== Current squad ==
=== First-team squad ===
As of 4 Jun 2026

Note: Flags indicate national team as defined under FIFA eligibility rules; some limited exceptions apply. Players may hold more than one non-FIFA nationality.

No.	Pos.	Nation	Player
1	GK	SGP	Fairol Abdullah
2		SGP	Hakim Jalil (vice captain)
3		SGP	Farhan Ngatiman
4		SGP	Zulfadhli Suzliman
6		SGP	Khairi Noor Khalid
7		SGP	Azhar Rahim
8		SGP	Imran Adanan
10		SGP	Zulkifli Suzliman
11		SGP	Dwayne Sng
12		SGP	Ian Ryannto
13		SGP	Dylan Mah
15		SGP	Rafli Rahaman
16		SGP	Haziq
17		SGP	Aadil Fadzli

No.	Pos.	Nation	Player
18	GK	SGP	Asyraf Asyfar
19		SGP	Shazrin
21		SGP	Nizam Sani
22		SGP	Tsaqif Dzukefle
23		SGP	Shah Arif Osman
24		SGP	Hasan Azlan
25	GK	SGP	Raziq Peermohamed
26		SGP	Tarmizi Suhaimin
27		SGP	Harriz
28		SGP	Arumi Yusoff
29		SGP	Alfateh Azman
30		SGP	Danial Sa'adon (captain)
31		SGP	Idzhar Jaafar
88		SGP	Helmi Mohamad

== Management and staff ==
As of 25 Feb 2026

Position	Name
Chairman	
Head coach	(Singapore) Nurhaizal Sufri
Assistant coach	(Singapore) Rizuwan Mahzan
Under-23 coach	(Singapore) Rizuwan Mahzan
Sports Trainer	(Singapore) Amir Keedil
Head Physiologist	(Singapore) Amir Keedil
Team manager	(Singapore) Kishore Kumar
Players Advisor	(Singapore) C Chellayah (Cher)

== Coaching history ==
- (Singapore) Mohd Mardani (2016-2017, 2019-2024)
- (Singapore) Khairul Asyraf (2017)
- (Singapore) Nurhaizal Sufri (2026-present)

== Current season ==
=== Island Wide League ===
League Table

Pos	Team	Pld	W	D	L	GF	GA	GD	Pts	SCF	JCF	GSF	ECF	MSF	GFA	PLF
1	Sembawang City FC (Q)	6	5	0	1	32	6	+26	15	—	1–3	5–2	9–0	—	—	—
2	Jurong City FC (Q)	6	4	1	1	21	10	+11	13	—	—	6–1	2–3	—	4–1	—
3	Geylang Serai FC	6	3	0	3	15	12	+3	9	—	—	—	2–1	2–0	1–3	—
4	Eunos Crescent FC	6	3	0	3	11	18	−7	9	—	—	—	—	2–1	0–2	5–2
5	Mattar Sailors FC	6	2	1	3	10	16	−6	7	0–8	3–3	—	—	—	—	3–1
6	GFA Petir FC	6	2	1	3	10	17	−7	7	1–2	—	—	—	0–3	—	8–2
7	Pasirian Lions FC	6	0	1	5	8	28	−20	1	0–7	1–3	2–2	—	—	—	—

Source: fas.org.sg
Rules for classification: 1) points; 2) goal difference; 3) number of goals scored; 4) number of wins
(Q) Qualified for Quarter-finals.

== Achievements ==
- National Football League (Division 1)

Champions: 2016

- National Football League (Division 2)

Champions: 2006

- Women's Premier League

Champions: 2014

== Past seasons ==
=== Leagues ===
Season	League	Pos	Pld	W	D	L	GF	GA	GD	Pts
2017	NFL DIV 1	6th	22	8	2	12	38	60	-22	60
2018	NFL DIV 1	8th	18	3	4	11	21	40	-19	13
2019	NFL DIV 1	10th	13	0	0	13	7	66	-59	0
Competition not held from 2020 to 2021
2022	SFL 2	6th	18	7	3	8	31	38	-7	24
2023	SFL 2	7th	18	5	5	8	29	41	-12	20
2024	SFL 2	10th	13	1	3	9	15	31	-16	6
2025	IWL	Did not participate								
2026	IWL	7th	6	3	0	3	11	18	-7	9

=== Cups ===
Season	Cup	Progress
2017	FAS FA Cup	Second Round
2018	FAS FA Cup	
2019	FAS FA Cup	Round of 32
Competition not held from 2020 to 2022
2023	FAS FA Cup	Second Round
Competition not held in 2024
2025	Did not participate	
2026	FAS FA Cup	

== See also ==
- 2017 Eunos Crescent FC season
