= Singapore Football League =

- Organising body: Football Association of Singapore
- Founded: 1975; 51 years ago (as National Football League); 2020; 6 years ago (as Singapore Football League)
- Country: Singapore
- Number of clubs: 8 (Division 1), 10 (Division 2)
- Level on pyramid: 2 and 3
- Relegation to: Island Wide League
- Domestic cup: Singapore FA Cup
- Current champions: Singapore Cricket Club (SFL 1); Bishan Barx (SFL 2)
- Most championships: Singapore Khalsa Association & Police SA (4 titles in Division 1); Singapore Cricket Club (3 titles in Division 2)
- Website: Division 1 Division 2
- Current: 2026-27 Singapore Football League

The Singapore Football League (SFL) is a league of senior football clubs from Singapore that are affiliated with the Football Association of Singapore (FAS). Founded in 1975, it was the top-level football league in Singapore from its foundation until 1988, when it was replaced by the FAS Premier League.

It now makes up the second and third tiers of football in Singapore after the fully professional Singapore Premier League (SPL), which was established in 1996 as the S.League (renamed the SPL in 2018), which replaced the FAS Premier League. Teams in the SFL are eligible to compete in the Singapore FA Cup but are not able to be promoted to the SPL, as the latter does not practice a promotion and relegation system.

There is relegation and promotion between SFL Division 2 and the Island Wide League, which is at the fourth tier of the Singapore football league system.

Although largely amateur, several of the clubs that play in the league are described as semi-professional. Several former national team and ex-S.League players have played in the league such as Jonathan Xu, Indra Sahdan Daud, Precious Emuejeraye and Ahmad Latiff (Eunos Crescent), Yazid Yasin (Gymkhana) and Zulkiffli Hassim (Yishun Sentek Mariners).

The current season started later in the year (2026) and for the first time will continue into the following year (2027) to bring it in line with the Singapore Premier League.

== History ==
=== Early league football (1904–1974) ===
League football in Singapore dates back to 1904. The FAS League remained amateur until the 1970s. The FAS League took place alongside the Singapore Business Houses League, where players were paid by their employers. Until 1994, players could play for different clubs in different leagues.

Discussions about a professional league started as early as 1973. Although a professional league was not feasible at that time, it was decided that significant restructuring was required.

=== Formation of the National Football League (1975–1987) ===
In 1975, the National Football League was formed when the Football Association of Singapore (FAS) revamped the existing league structure involving 118 teams into a three-tier league with 30 teams. Clubs were required to identify with a constituency or district in Singapore. Several clubs changed their names to comply with this requirement, including International Contract Specialists to Geylang International, and Hamilton to Jalan Besar.

The 10 clubs chosen for Division One for the first NFL season in 1975 were Changi Constituency, Farrer Park United, Geylang International, Jalan Besar, Jurong Town, Queenstown, SAFSA, Sembawang Constituency, Toa Payoh United and Upper Serangoon United.

In 1981, the NFL changed its points system from two points to three points for a win. The same year, the NFL entered into a sponsorship deal with Ovaltine.

For the 1987 season, the teams first played each other once in a league format. The top eight placed teams in the league progressed to a knock-out stage to determine the champions. League stage winners Tiong Bahru defeated 4th-placed Tampines Rovers 2–1 in the final to clinch the championship.

=== Establishment of the FAS Premier League (1988–1995) ===
The top tier of the football league system was replaced by the FAS Premier League in 1988. The NFL (Divisions One and Two) continued as the second and third tiers of the Singapore football league system. There was no automatic promotion and relegation between the NFL and the Premier League, as the Premier League was an "elite" competition. Entry into the Premier League required FAS approval.

After the Island Wide League was formalised in 1987, there was promotion and relegation between the bottom tier of the NFL and the Island Wide League.

=== Introduction of semi-professional football (1996–2000) ===
In 1996, following Singapore's withdrawal from the Malaysia Cup in 1995, the FAS created the S.League, the first fully professional league in Singapore. That season (1996), the NFL, which continued as a de facto second tier, was re-structured, with the clubs previously in two divisions (tiers) playing as a single level, divided into three groups by balloting. After the group stage was completed, eight teams went through to a knock-out stage. Balestier United, which had finished second in their group, won the knock out phase.

In 1997, the NFL returned to a three-division structure.

The NFL subsequently operated as the second to fourth tiers of Singapore football, with promotion and relegation between Divisions One and Two but no automatic promotion to the S.League.. Between 1988 and the early 2000s, while promotion and relegation between the top level and the second level remained available, it was not automatic.

In 1999, Division Three remained as the fourth level of Singapore football. In the 2001 season, foreign players were barred from Divisions Two and Three to allow for better development of local players.

=== Restructuring of the National Football League (2001–2015) ===
In 2002, several lower tier football clubs were found to be operating unlicensed gaming machines or gambling dens Several such clubs were found to be fronts for such illicit activity, and were closed down. The closure of several clubs in that period affected Divisions Two and Three.

The NFL continued to serve as the lower levels of Singapore's football league system until a major restructuring in 2016.

In 2016, the FAS changed the NFL into a single division with 10 teams. On 17 January 2017, FAS announced that the 2017 season would comprise two divisions with 12 teams playing in each division. Clubs from the 2016 Island Wide League (IWL) were incorporated into the NFL as Division Two. There was no IWL for 2017. The announcement was made in September 2016.

=== Renaming to the Singapore Football League (2020–2021) ===
In 2020, the NFL was renamed as the Singapore Football League (SFL). Due to the COVID-19 pandemic, the first season of the revamped SFL was delayed to 2022.

=== Resumption and recent developments (2022–present) ===
The SFL resumed in 2022 with a two-division structure. Singapore Khalsa Association won the inaugural SFL Division One league title, while Jungfrau Punggol won the Division Two league title.

Singapore Khalsa Association retained the Division One title in 2023 and 2024, becoming champions for three consecutive seasons from 2022 to 2024. Police SA won Division Two in 2023, while Tengah FC claimed the title in 2024. The two-division structure continued in 2025, when Singapore Cricket Club won Division One. The promotion and relegation system remained in place, subject to FAS regulations.

== Current clubs ==
As of the 2026–27 season.

=== Division 1 clubs ===
- Bishan Barx
- Jungfrau Punggol
- Police SA
- Project Vaults Oxley SC
- Singapore Cricket Club
- South Avenue SC
- Singapore Khalsa Association
- Tengah FC (formerly known as Woodlands United)

=== Division 2 clubs ===
- Admiralty CSN
- Frenz GDT Circuit
- GFA Victoria (formerly GFA Sporting Westlake)
- Gymkhana Gaulois
- Kaki Bukit SC
- Katong FC
- Starlight Soccerites
- Tanah Merah United
- Warwick Knights
- Yishun Mariners

== SFL Division 1 champions ==
For a listing by tier, see List of Singapore's football leagues winners.

=== SFL Division 1 ===
The league was called the National Football League (NFL) from 1975 to 2019, before being renamed as the Singapore Football League (SFL), which is the current name. The NFL Division One was the top tier of the Singapore football league system from 1975 to 1987. In 1988, the FAS Premier League was formed, and the NFL Divison One continued as the second tier of Singapore football.

Season	Champions	Runners up
As National Football League Division One
1975	Geylang International	SAFSA (Note: Singapore Armed Forces Sports Association, later Warriors FC)
1976	Geylang International (2)	Farrer Park United
1977	Geylang International (3)	Toa Payoh United
1978	SAFSA	Tampines Rovers
1979	Tampines Rovers	Geylang Internationals
1980	Tampines Rovers (2)	SAFSA
1981	SAFSA (2)	Farrer Park United
1982	Farrer Park United	Police SA
1983	Tiong Bahru CSC	Toa Payoh United
1984	Tampines Rovers (3)	Farrer Park United
1985	Police SA	Farrer Park United
1986	SAFSA (3)	Tiong Bahru CSC
1987	Tiong Bahru CSC	Police SA

With the formation of the FAS Premier League in 1988, the NFL Division One became the second tier of Singapore league football.

Season	Champions	Runners up
As National Football League Division One
1988	Tyrwhitt Soccerites	Jubilee SA
1989	Telok Kurau United	Gibraltar Crescent
1990	Gibraltar Crescent	Ang Mo Kio CSC
1991	Redhill Rangers	South Avenue SC
1992	South Avenue SC	Jurong Town
1993	Sembawang SC	South Avenue SC
1994	Tampines Rovers	Changi United
1995	Wellington	
1996 (Note: Single tier NFL with three groups of 7 teams each. The group winners were Tampines Rovers, Jurong Town FC and Marine Castle.)	Balestier United (Note: The amateur club that remained after the professional club, Balestier Central, was formed to compete in the inaugural S. League in 1996.)	Mountbatten
1997	Mountbatten	Marine Castle United
1998	Singapore Khalsa Association	Kaki Bukit SC
1999	Sembawang SC (Note: The amateur club that remained after the professional club, Sembawang Rangers, was formed by the merger of the original club and Gibraltar Crescent to compete in the inaugural S. League in 1996.) (2)	Police SA (Note: The amateur club that remained after the professional club, Home United, was formed to compete in the inaugural S. League in 1996.)
2000	Police SA	
2001	Andrews Avenue SC	
2002	Police SA (2)	
2003	Police SA (3)	
2006	Admiralty	Tessensohn Khalsa Rovers
2007	Admiralty (2)	Katong
2008	Sembawang SC (3)	SAFSA (Note: The amateur club that remained after the professional club was formed in 1996 as Singapore Armed Forces FC to participate in the S. League, before changing its name to Warriors FC in 2013.)
2009	Singapore Cricket Club	
2010	Singapore Cricket Club (2)	Eunos Crescent
2011	Singapore Recreation Club	
2012	Singapore Recreation Club (2)	Singapore Cricket Club
2013	Police SA (4)	Singapore Recreation Club
2014	Sporting Westlake	Police SA
2015	Singapore Recreation Club (3)	Tiong Bahru (Note: The amateur club that remained after the professional club, Tiong Bahru United, was formed in 1996 to compete in the inaugural S. League.)
2016	Eunos Crescent	Police SA
2017	Yishun Sentek Mariners	SAFSA
2018	Tiong Bahru	Balestier United
2019	Tiong Bahru (2)	GFA Sporting Westlake

Season	Champions	Runners up
As Singapore Football League 1
2020	Competition not held (Note: Amateur competitions were not held in Singapore in 2020 and 2021 due to the COVID-19 pandemic.)	
2021	Competition not held	
2022	Singapore Khalsa Association (2)	Yishun Sentek Mariners
2023	Singapore Khalsa Association (3)	Tiong Bahru
2024	Singapore Khalsa Association (4)	Singapore Cricket Club
2025	Singapore Cricket Club (3)	Jungfrau Punggol
2026–27		

=== Performances by SFL Division 1 ===
Clubs that have won the SFL Division 1 as the second tier of Singapore football (since 1988).

Club	Champions	Winning seasons
Police SA	4	2000, 2002, 2003, 2013
Singapore Khalsa Association	4	1998, 2022, 2023, 2024
Sembawang SC	3	1993, 1999, 2008
Singapore Cricket Club	3	2009, 2010, 2025
Singapore Recreation Club	3	2011, 2012, 2015
Admiralty	2	2006, 2007
Tiong Bahru	2	2018, 2019
Tyrwhitt Soccerites	1	1988
Telok Kurau United	1	1989
Gibraltar Crescent	1	1990
Redhill Rangers	1	1991
South Avenue SC	1	1992
Tampines Rovers	1	1994
Wellington	1	1995
Balestier United	1	1996
Mountbatten	1	1997
Andrews Avenue SC	1	2001
Sporting Westlake	1	2014
Eunos Crescent	1	2016
Yishun Sentek Mariners	1	2017

== SFL Division 2 champions ==
=== SFL Division 2 ===
The league was called the National Football League (NFL) from 1975 to 2019, before being renamed as the Singapore Football League (SFL), which is the current name. The NFL Division Two was the second tier of the Singapore football league system from 1975 to 1987, below the NFL Division One. In 1988, the FAS Premier League was formed as the top tier, and the NFL Divison Two continued as the third tier of Singapore football, below the NFL Division One.

Season	Champions	Runners up
As National Football League Division Two
1975	Tampines Rovers	Ponggol Constituency
1976	Changi United	Sembawang Constituency
1977	Kaki Bukit / Chai Chee	Cairnhill CSC
1978	Ponggol Constituency	Changi United
1979	Tiong Bahru CSC	Mountbatten
1980	Police SA	Jubilee SA
1981	Sembawang CSC	Farrer Park Dynamos
1982	Cairnhill	Toa Payoh United
1983	Geylang International	Jubilee SA
1984	South Avenue	Changi United
1985	Changi Constituency	Ayer Rajah Wanderers
1986	Pioneer Arsenal	Kaki Bukit SC
1987	Tyrwhitt Soccerites	Geylang Internationals

With the formation of the FAS Premier League in 1988, the NFL Divison Two continued as the third tier of Singapore football.

Season	Champions	Runners up
As National Football League Division Two
1988	South Avenue	Hai Sing Park Rangers
1989	Ang Mo Kio CSC	
1990	Changi United	Redhill Rangers
1991	Admiralty	Bukit Merah
1992	Charlton	Pioneer Arsenal
1993	Changi United (2)	Marine Castle
1994	Wellington	Mountbatten
1995		
1996	Competition not held	
1997	Redhill Rangers	Tessensohn Khalsa Rovers
1998	Sembawang SC	Andrews Avenue SC
1999	Singapore Cricket Club	
2000	Andrews Avenue SC	
2001		
2002	Katong	
2003		
2004		
2005		
2006	Eunos Crescent	Katong
2007	West United	Kaki Bukit SC
2008	Singapore Cricket Club (2)	
2009	Prison SRC	
2010	Borussia Zamrud	Kaki Bukit SC
2011	Keppel Monaco	Tiong Bahru
2012	Admiralty (2)	Sporting Westlake
2013	Singapore Khalsa Association	Pioneer CSC
2014	Yishun Sentek Mariners	Siglap CSC
2015	Singapore Cricket Club (3)	Katong
2016	Competition not held (Note: NFL was revamped into a single-division competition with 10 teams in 2016.)	
2017	Gymkhana Gaulois	South Avenue SC
2018	Singapore Khalsa Association (2)	Warwick Knights
2019	Project Vault Oxley	Siglap

In 2020, the NFL was renamed as the SFL.

Season	Champions	Runners up
As Singapore Football League 2
2020	Competition not held	
2021	Competition not held	
2022	Jungfrau Punggol	Singapore Cricket Club
2023	Police SA	South Avenue SC
2024	Tengah	Jungfrau Punggol
2025	Bishan Barx	South Avenue SC
2026–27		

=== Performances by SFL Division 2 ===
Clubs that have won the SFL Division 2 as the third tier of Singapore football (since 1988).

Club	Champions	Winning seasons
Singapore Cricket Club	3	1999, 2008, 2015
Changi United	2	1990, 1993
Admiralty	2	1991, 2012
Singapore Khalsa Association	2	2013, 2018
Tiong Bahru	2	2018, 2019
Charlton	1	1992
Wellington	1	1994
South Avenue	1	1988
Ang Mo Kio CSC	1	1989
Redhill Rangers	1	1997
Sembawang SC	1	1998
Andrews Avenue SC	1	2000
Katong	1	2002
Eunos Crescent	1	2006
West United	1	2007
Prison SRC	1	2009
Borussia Zamrud	1	2010
Keppel Monaco	1	2011
Yishun Sentek Mariners	1	2014
Gymkhana Gaulois	1	2017
Project Vault Oxley	1	2019
Jungfrau Punggol	1	2022
Police SA	1	2023
Tengah	1	2024
Bishan Barx	1	2025

== NFL Division 3 (1975 to 1987, and intermittently from 1999 to 2013) ==
When the National Football League (NFL) was formed in 1975, it had three divisions, with Division 3 as the third tier of Singapore football. Division Three continued until 1987. When the FAS Premier League was formed in 1988, NFL Division Three ceased to exist.

Season	Champions	Runners up
1975	Cairnhill FC	Pasir Panjang CSC
1976	Mountbatten FC	Bukit Panjang United
1977		
1978	Tiong Bahru CSC	
1979	Jubilee SA	Police SA
1980		
1981		
1982	Ponggol CSC	Balestier United
1983		
1984	Mountbatten	
1985	Hai Sing Park Rangers	Gibraltar Crescent
1986	Singapore Chinese	
1987		

Between 1999 and 2013, NFL Division 3 was re-created in certain years as the fourth tier of Singapore football, at a level above the Island Wide League, which would otherwise have been the next tier.

Season	Champions	Runners up
1999		
2000		
2001	Katong FC	
2002-2003	No records	
2004		
2005		
2006	Kaki Bukit	
2007	Tiong Bahru	
2008		
2009		
2010	Balestier United	
2011		
2012	Gambas Avenue SC	Summerville FC
2013	Starlight Soccerites	Tampines Vipers

== Total number of titles by club ==
The total number of titles per club by division (Division One or Division Two) from 1975 to date.

See under List of Singapore's football leagues winners for breakdown by level under the Singapore football league system.

=== Division 1 ===
First tier from 1975 to 1987, second tier from 1988 to date

SFL Division 1
Club	Winners	Winning years
Tampines Rovers	4	1979, 1980,1984, 1994
Singapore Khalsa Association (including Tessensohn Khalsa Rovers)	4	1998, 2022, 2023, 2024
Geylang Internationals	3	1975, 1976, 1977
SAFSA (later known as Warriors FC)	3	1978, 1981, 1986
Singapore Recreation Club	3	2011, 2012, 2015
Sembawang SC (later merged to form Sembawang Rangers)	3	1993, 1999, 2008
Police SA (current club)	3	2000, 2002, 2003
Tiong Bahru CSC (now Tanjong Pagar United)	2	1983, 1987
Admiralty FC	2	2006, 2007
Singapore Cricket Club	2	2009, 2025
Tiong Bahru FC	2	2018, 2019
Farrer Park United	1	1982
Police SA (now Lion City Sailors)	1	1985
Tyrwhitt Soccerites	1	1988
Telok Kurau United	1	1989
Gibraltar Crescent (later merged to form Sembawang Rangers)	1	1990
Redhill Rangers(later merged to form Sembawang Rangers)	1	1991
South Avenue SC	1	1992
Wellington FC	1	1995
Balestier United	1	1996
Mountbatten FC	1	1997
Andrews Avenue SC	1	2001
Eunos Crescent	1	2016
Yishun Sentek Mariners	1	2017

=== Division 2 ===
Second tier from 1975 to 1987, third tier from 1988 to date

SFL Division 2
Club	Winners	Winning years
Changi United	3	1976, 1990, 1993
Singapore Cricket Club	3	199, 2008, 2015
South Avenue SC	2	1984, 1988
Admiralty FC	2	1991, 2012
Tampines Rovers	1	1975
Kaki Bukit SC	1	1977
Ponggol Constituency	1	1978
Tiong Bahru CSC	1	1979
Police SA	1	1980
Sembawang CSC	1	1981
Cairnhill	1	1982
Geylang International	1	1983
Changi Constituency	1	1985
Pioneer Arsenal	1	1986
Tyrwhitt Soccerites	1	1987
Ang Mo Kio CSC	1	1989
Charlton FC	1	1992
Wellington FC	1	1994
Redhill Rangers	1	1997
Sembawang SC	1	1998
Andrews Avenue SC	1	2000
Katong FC	1	2002
Eunos Crescent	1	2006
West United	1	2007
Prisons SRC	1	2009
Yishun Sentek Mariners	1	2014
Gymkhana	1	2017
Singapore Khalsa Association	1	2018
Project Vault Oxley	1	2019
Jungfrau Punggol	1	2022
Police SA	1	2023
Tengah FC	1	2024
Bishan Barx	1	2025

=== Division 3 ===
Third tier from 1975 to 1987, fourth tier from 1988 to 2013. Not held since 2013.

Information incomplete.

== Stadium ==
=== Vacant stadiums used ===
- Bedok Stadium
- Bukit Gombak Stadium
- Choa Chu Kang Stadium
- Clementi Stadium
- Woodlands Stadium
- Yishun Stadium

=== Current Singapore Premier League clubs stadium used ===
- Hougang Stadium
- Jalan Besar Stadium
- Toa Payoh Stadium

== See also ==
- FAS Premier League
- Singapore Premier League
- Island Wide League
- Singapore FA Cup
- Singapore League Cup
- Prime League
- List of football clubs in Singapore
- List of Singapore's football leagues winners
- Singapore football league system
