= 2026–27 Singapore Football League =

50th season of Singapore Football League

The 2026-27 Singapore Football League is the 50th season of the Singapore Football League (SFL). The league will feature promotion and relegation between football clubs in League 1, 2 and the Island Wide League.

The league kicked off on 20 September 2026.

The current season started later in the year compared to previous season and for the first time will continue into the following year (2027) to bring it in line with the Singapore Premier League.

The SFL Challenge Cup, the season curtain raiser between the previous season's Division One champions (Singapore Cricket Club) and the winners of the Singapore FA Cup (Warwick Knights) was not played.

== League 1 ==
Singapore Football League 1
- Season: 2026-27
- All statistics correct as of 21 Sep 2026.

2026-27 Singapore Football League 1 (SFL 1) was originally scheduled to kick off on 18 September 2026. However, the opening match between Tengah FC and Jungfrau Punggol FC was postponed.

2025 SFL2 Champions Bishan Barx FC and Runner-ups South Avenue FC are promoted to the SFL 1 for the 2026-27 season.

=== League table ===
Pos	Team	Pld	W	D	L	GF	GA	GD	Pts
1	Singapore Cricket Club	5	4	0	1	18	7	+11	12
2	Police SA	5	3	1	1	10	5	+5	10
3	Project Vaults Oxley SC	5	3	1	1	8	3	+5	10
4	Tengah FC	4	2	1	1	6	3	+3	7
5	South Avenue SC	4	1	1	2	8	12	−4	4
6	Jungfrau Punggol FC	3	1	0	2	3	4	−1	3
7	Bishan Barx FC	4	1	0	3	3	6	−3	3
8	Singapore Khalsa Association	4	0	0	4	4	20	−16	0

Updated to match(es) played on 1 November 2026. Source: Football Association of Singapore
Rules for classification: 1) points; 2) goal difference; 3) number of goals scored; 4) number of wins

=== Fixtures and results ===
Home \ Away	BBFC	JPFC	PSA	PVO	SCC	SKA	SASC	TFC
Bishan Barx FC		1–0			0–1			
Jungfrau Punggol FC					1–2			
Police SA	4–2	1–2						0–0
Project Vaults Oxley SC	1–0		0–1			3–1	1–1	
Singapore Cricket Club			1–4					
Singapore Khalsa Association					0–8		3–5	0–4
South Avenue SC					2–6			
Tengah FC				0–3			2–0	

Updated to match(es) played on 1 November 2026. Source: Football Association of Singapore
Legend: Blue = home team win; Yellow = draw; Red = away team win.

=== Top scorers ===
As of 1 Sep 2026

Rank	Player	Club	Goals
1			

Source: Football Association of Singapore

== League 2 ==
Singapore Football League 2
- Season: 2026-27
- All statistics correct as of 21 Sep 2026.

2026-27 Singapore Football League 2 (SFL 2) kicked off on 20 September 2026.

Yishun Mariners FC and Katong FC was relegated from SFL 1 last season.

Tanah Merah United and Gymkhana Gaulois FC were promoted from the 2025 Island Wide League (IWL) as Champions and Runner-ups respectively.

Yishun Sentek Mariners was renamed as Yishun Mariners, and Gymkhana was renamed as Gymkhana Gaulois for the upcoming season.

The top two teams of the SFL 2 shall be promoted to the SFL 1, while the bottom two teams of the SFL 2 shall be relegated to the IWL for the 2026 season.

=== League table ===
Pos	Team	Pld	W	D	L	GF	GA	GD	Pts
1	Gymkhana Gaulois FC	4	4	0	0	28	3	+25	12
2	Frenz GDT Circuit FC	5	4	0	1	20	11	+9	12
3	Tanah Merah United	4	2	2	0	12	5	+7	8
4	Katong FC	4	2	1	1	5	5	0	7
5	GFA Victoria FC	4	2	0	2	5	12	−7	6
6	Warwick Knights FC	4	1	1	2	6	7	−1	4
7	Admiralty CSN	5	1	1	3	5	20	−15	4
8	Starlight Soccerites	5	1	0	4	8	12	−4	3
9	Kaki Bukit SC	4	1	0	3	5	13	−8	3
10	Yishun Mariners FC	3	0	1	2	4	10	−6	1

Updated to match(es) played on 1 November 2026. Source: Football Association of Singapore
Rules for classification: 1) points; 2) goal difference; 3) number of goals scored; 4) number of wins

Note:
1. M1 – Yishun Mariners vs Gymkhana Gaulois (0-6) result was removed from official table.
2. M4 – Warwick Knights was awarded 3-0 against Starlight Soccerites (Original scoreline: 2-2).
3. M5 – Katong FC vs Tanah Merah United (1-1) result was removed from official table.

=== Fixtures and results ===
Home \ Away	ACSN	GDT	GFV	GGFC	KBSC	KFC	SSFC	TMU	WKFC	YMFC
Admiralty CSN			0–1	0–12						
Frenz GDT Circuit FC			8–2	2–4						4–2
GFA Victoria FC							1–0			
Gymkhana Gaulois FC					9–1				3–0	
Kaki Bukit SC	1–2					0–1	3–1			
Katong FC		0–2								2–2
Starlight Soccerites	4–1	3–4								
Tanah Merah United	2–2		4–1							
Warwick Knights FC						1–2	3–0	2–2		
Yishun Mariners FC								0–4		

Updated to match(es) played on 1 November 2026. Source: Football Association of Singapore
Legend: Blue = home team win; Yellow = draw; Red = away team win.

=== Top scorers ===
As of 1 Sep 2026

Rank	Player	Club	Goals
1			

Source: Football Association of Singapore

== See also ==
- 2026 Island Wide League
- 2026 Singapore FA Cup
