= 2025 Singapore FA Cup =

2025 Football Association Cup
Singapore FA Cup

Tournament details
- Country: Singapore
- Dates: 28 September – 9 November 2025
- Teams: 39

Final positions
- Champions: Warwick Knights
- Runners-up: Police SA
- Third place: Singapore Cricket Club

Tournament statistics
- Matches played: 39
- Top goal scorer(s): Amirul Walid (11 goals)

The 2025 Football Association Cup is the latest season of the FAS FA Cup, which is open to all teams from Singapore Football League (SFL) and Island Wide League (IWL) in Singapore.

The 2025 FA Cup will be played from September to November 2025.

SFL 1 team Yishun Sentek Mariners are the defending champions, having defeated Singapore Khalsa Association in the 2023 season's final.

SFL 2 team Warwick Knights lifted their first ever FA Cup by defeating SFL1 Police SA 2-1 in the Finals through Amirul Walid's 96-minute goal. Amirul Walid finished the season as the 2025 FA Cup top scorer, scoring 11 goals.

== Format ==
The competition is based on a single-leg knockout system with 30 teams from Singapore Football League 2 (SFL2) and Island Wide League (IWL) playing in the first round.

In the event the scores are tied after ninety (90) minutes of regulation time, the winner shall be decided by penalties.

21 IWL teams and 9 SFL2 teams will play in the first two rounds of the 2025 Singapore FA Cup. Newly crowned 2025 SFL2 Champions Bishan Barx received a first-round bye, while the SFL1 teams will advance to the Third round directly.

== First Round ==
28 September 2025	Tiong Bahru	P-P	Bukit Timah	Bedok Stadium
17:00 UTC+8
Note: Match postponed due to Lightning Warning System.

28 September 2025	Starlight Soccerites	7-0	Yishun FC	Clementi Stadium
17:00 UTC+8	Iqmal D.; Sadik S.; Iqram; Daniel M.	Report

28 September 2025	Geylang Serai	1-0	Verde Cresta Combined	Woodlands Stadium
17:00 UTC+8	Alif S.

28 September 2025	Simei United	P-P	Woodlands Rangers	Yishun Stadium
17:00 UTC+8

28 September 2025	Westwood El'Junior	1-3	Sembawang City	Jurong East Stadium
17:00 UTC+8	Goal	Report	Goal

28 September 2025	GFA Victoria	2-1	Commonwealth Cosmos	Bedok Stadium
19:30 UTC+8	Goal		Goal

28 September 2025	Mattar Sailors	8-0	East Dragon	Clementi Stadium
19:30 UTC+8	Akid D.; Ganesan K.; Irfan S.

28 September 2025	Tanah Merah United	5-0	Admiralty City	Woodlands Stadium
19:30 UTC+8	Goal	Report

28 September 2025	Admiralty CSN	1-1	Gymkhana	Yishun Stadium
19:30 UTC+8	Goal		Goal
Note: Admiralty won the penalty shootout. However, FAS did not published the score on the website.

5 October 2025	GDT Circuit	3-2	Pasirian Lions	Bedok Stadium
17:00 UTC+8

5 October 2025	Tessensohn Khalsa	0-1	Eastern Thunder	Clementi Stadium
17:00 UTC+8

5 October 2025	South Avenue	6-0	Bedok South Avenue	Jurong East Stadium
17:00 UTC+8

5 October 2025	Singapore Xin Hua	2-3	Winchester Isla	Bedok Stadium
19:30 UTC+8			Ridzuan; Jim

5 October 2025	Warwick Knights	3-1	Ayer Rajah Gryphons	Clementi Stadium
19:30 UTC+8	Amirul Walid; Faroukh Farkhan	Report

5 October 2025	Kaki Bukit	6-2	Woodlands Lions	Jurong East Stadium
19:30 UTC+8

12 October 2025	Tiong Bahru	2-3	Bukit Timah	Clementi Stadium
17:00 UTC+8
Note: Match postponed from 28 Sep due to Lightning Warning System.

12 October 2025	Simei United	2-5	Woodlands Rangers	Bedok Stadium
UTC+8
Note: The match was rescheduled from 28 September 2025.

== Second Round ==
12 October 2025	Sembawang City	5-2	Mattar Sailors	Jurong East Stadium
UTC+8

12 October 2025	GFA Victoria	2-2	Tanah Merah United	Choa Chu Kang Stadium
UTC+8

12 October 2025	Admiralty CSN	1-2	Eastern Thunder	Bedok Stadium
19:30 UTC+8	(pen.)	Report	Thomas; Delphis

12 October 2025	GDT Circuit	3-1	South Avenue	Clementi Stadium
UTC+8

12 October 2025	Winchester Isla	1-1 (1-4 p)	Bishan Barx	Jurong East Stadium
UTC+8	Jim

12 October 2025	Warwick Knights	1-0	Kaki Bukit	Choa Chu Kang Stadium
UTC+8	Amirul Walid	Report

16 October 2025 M16	Bukit Timah	3-3 (4-5 p)	Geylang Serai	Bukit Gombak Stadium
19:45 UTC+8	Goal	Report	Sidharth	Player of the Match: Sidharth

16 October 2025 M17	Starlight Soccerites	5-4	Woodlands Rangers	Woodlands Stadium
19:45 UTC+8	Sadik S.; Taufiq M.	Report

== Third Round ==
18 October 2025 M24	Tengah FC	1-2	Geylang Serai	Choa Chu Kang Stadium
17:00 UTC+8		Report

18 October 2025 M25	Katong FC	2-2 (2-3 p)	Starlight Soccerites	Choa Chu Kang Stadium
19:30 UTC+8		Report	Shafiqal Z.

19 October 2025 M26	Police SA	2-1	Sembawang City	Bedok Stadium
17:00 UTC+8		Report

19 October 2025 M27	Jungfrau Punggol	3-1	GFA Victoria	Jurong East Stadium
17:00 UTC+8		Report

19 October 2025 M28	Singapore Cricket Club	5-0	Eastern Thunder	Clementi Stadium
17:00 UTC+8

19 October 2025 M29	Project Vaults Oxley	0-2	GDT Circuit	Bedok Stadium
17:30 UTC+8		Report	Khairul Nizam; Faiz Zulfadhly

19 October 2025 M31	Yishun Sentek Mariners	2-3	Warwick Knights	Clementi Stadium
17:30 UTC+8		Report	Amirul Walid; Haziq Jihad

22 October 2025 M30	Singapore Khalsa Association	3-0	Bishan Barx	Bukit Gombak Stadium
19:45 UTC+8	Fazrul Nawaz; Shahrukh; Faizal	Report

== Quarter Finals ==
26 October 2025 M32	Geylang Serai	0-6	Police SA	Bedok Stadium
17:00 UTC+8

26 October 2025 M33	Starlight Soccerites	2-3	Jungfrau Punggol	Clementi Stadium
17:00 UTC+8	Sadik; Ridhuan	Report

26 October 2025 M34	Singapore Cricket Club	3-1	Singapore Khalsa Association	Bedok Stadium
19:30 UTC+8

26 October 2025 M35	GDT Circuit	2-5	Warwick Knights	Clementi Stadium
19:30 UTC+8	Faiz Zulfadhly; Zuhaili Suib	Report	Amirul Walid; Faroukh Farkhan; Alang; (o.g.)

== Semi Finals ==
2 November 2025 M36	Police SA	5-4	Singapore Cricket Club	Bedok Stadium
17:00 UTC+8		Report

2 November 2025 M37	Jungfrau Punggol	2-3	Warwick Knights	Clementi Stadium
17:00 UTC+8	Goal	Report	Amirul Walid; Shameer Aziq

== Third-place Playoff ==
9 November 2025 M38	Singapore Cricket Club	7-0	Jungfrau Punggol	Bedok Stadium
17:00 UTC+8

== Finals ==
9 November 2025 M39	Police SA	1-2	Warwick Knights	Bedok Stadium
19:30 UTC+8	Goal	Report	Amirul Walid 90+6'

== Top goalscorers ==
As of 3 November 2025

Rank	Player	Club	Goals
1	(Singapore) Amirul Walid	Warwick Knights	11
2	(Singapore) Sadik Said	Starlight Soccerites	9
3	(Singapore) Faiz Zulfadhly	GDT Circuit	5
4	(Singapore) Aiman Hafiz	Sembawang City	3
5	(Singapore) Akid Danial	Mattar Sailors	2
5	(Singapore) Ganesan Karan	Mattar Sailors	2
5	(Singapore) Irfan Shadat	Mattar Sailors	2

Source: FAS FA Cup
