= Commonwealth Cosmos FC =

Singaporean association football club

- Full name: Commonwealth Cosmos Football Club
- Nickname: The Hyenas
- Founded: 2014; 12 years ago
- Head coach: Haizal
- League: Island Wide League
- 2025: IWL, 6th of 7 (Group A)
- Website: https://www.facebook.com/commonwealthcosmos

Commonwealth Cosmos Football Club, nickname "the Hyenas", is a Singaporean amateur football club founded in 2014, and based in Commonwealth, Singapore.

The club last played in the name "Commonwealth Comsos" in the 2025 Island Wide League. The club changed its name to Jurong City Football Club. for the 2026 Island Wide League.

== History ==
The club enters the Football Association of Singapore lower division league, the Island Wide League (IWL) in 2018 where they won the 3rd place. In 2019, they won the IWL title and gain promotion to 2020 Singapore National Football League (NFL).

In 2020, the NFL was renamed as Singapore Football League (SFL). Due to the COVID-19 pandemic in Singapore, the first season of SFL started in 2022.

In 2022, the club begins their SFL 2 journey with a 3–0 loss to Bishan Barx FC. However, with reference to Articles 6.1. to 6.5. of the Singapore Football League 2022 Regulations, FAS announced that Commonwealth Cosmos FC shall be considered to have withdrawn from the league.

In 2025, Commonwealth Cosmos FC returns after two years absence from competitive football, and is currently competing in 2025 Island Wide League.

== Achievements ==
- Singapore Island Wide League

Champions: 2019

== Past seasons ==
=== Leagues ===
Season	League	Pos	Pld	W	D	L	GF	GA	GD	Pts	
2018	IWL	3rd	4	3	1	0	24	3	21	10	Reached semi-final
2019	IWL	1st	3	3	0	0	14	1	13	9	Champions'
Competition not held from 2020 to 2021
2022	SFL 2	10th	18	1	3	14	14	48	-34	6	Relegated (Note: FAS announced Commonwealth Cosmos FC withdrawal from SFL 2 in Dec 2022.)
2023	IWL	Did not participate									Withdrawn
2024	IWL	Did not participate									
2025	IWL	6th	6	0	4	2	5	13	-8	4	
2026	IWL	Did not participate									

=== Cups ===
Season	Cup	Progress
2018	FAS FA Cup	
2019	FAS FA Cup	Round of 32
Competition not held from 2020 to 2022
2023	Did not participate	
Competition not held in 2024
2025	FAS FA Cup	First Round
2026	FAS FA Cup	
