= 2026 Singapore FA Cup =

2026 Football Association Cup
Singapore FA Cup

Tournament details
- Country: Singapore
- Dates: 22 Aug – 6 Sept 2026
- Note: All statistics do not include penalty shoot-outs

The 2026 Football Association Cup is the latest season of the FAS FA Cup, which is open to all teams from Singapore Football League (SFL) and Island Wide League (IWL) in Singapore.

== Summary ==
On 20 March 2026, the Football Association of Singapore (FAS) announced an invitation to non-member clubs to participate in the 2026 Island Wide League and 2026 FA Cup. The 2026 FA Cup will commence after the conclusion of the league season and will be played from August to October 2026.

SFL 2 team Warwick Knights are the defending champions, having defeated Police SA in the 2025 season's final. They are given a bye to the second round of the competition.

The 2026 FA Cup officially kicks off with 6 matches being played on 22 August 2026.

On 23 August 2026, Sembawang City and Sembawang Park Rangers breached the regulations by failing to maintain the required minimum of two Under-23 Singaporean players on the field throughout the match.

On 28 August 2026, the FAS announced that the results of both matches would be overturned. GFA Victoria and Ayer Rajah Gryphons will be awarded 3–0 wins for the match against Sembawang City and Sembawang Park Rangers respectively. This resulted in the elimination of both infringing clubs in the first round of the competition.

The Singapore FA Cup final and third-place play-off, was originally scheduled for Oct 17 at Jurong East Stadium. However, both matches are postponed due to the haze situation in Singapore.

== Teams ==
Entry Round	League	Team
First Round	Island Wide League	Ayer Rajah Gryphons FC
First Round	Island Wide League	Bedok South Avenue SC
First Round	Island Wide League	Bukit Timah FC
First Round	Island Wide League	East Dragon FC
First Round	Island Wide League	Eastern Thunder FC
First Round	Island Wide League	Eunos Crescent FC
First Round	Island Wide League	Geylang Serai FC
First Round	Island Wide League	GFA Petir FC
First Round	Island Wide League	Jurong City FC
First Round	Island Wide League	Mattar Sailors FC
First Round	Island Wide League	Pasirian Lions FC
First Round	Island Wide League	Sembawang City FC
First Round	Island Wide League	Sembawang Park Rangers FC
First Round	Island Wide League	Simei United FC
First Round	Island Wide League	Singapore Recreation Club
First Round	Island Wide League	Singapore Xin Hua FC
First Round	Island Wide League	Tiong Bahru FC
First Round	Island Wide League	Westwood El'Junior FC
First Round	Island Wide League	Winchester Isla FC
First Round	Island Wide League	Woodlands Lions FC
First Round	Island Wide League	Woodlands Rangers FC
First Round	Singapore Football League 2	Admiralty CSN
First Round	Singapore Football League 2	Frenz GDT Circuit FC
First Round	Singapore Football League 2	GFA Victoria FC
First Round	Singapore Football League 2	Gymkhana Gaulois FC
First Round	Singapore Football League 2	Kaki Bukit SC
First Round	Singapore Football League 2	Katong FC
First Round	Singapore Football League 2	Starlight Soccerites
First Round	Singapore Football League 2	Tanah Merah United
First Round	Singapore Football League 2	Yishun Mariners FC
Second Round	Singapore Football League 2	Warwick Knights FC (Defending Champions)
Third Round (Round of 16)	Singapore Football League 1	Bishan Barx FC
Third Round (Round of 16)	Singapore Football League 1	Jungfrau Punggol FC
Third Round (Round of 16)	Singapore Football League 1	Police SA
Third Round (Round of 16)	Singapore Football League 1	Project Vaults Oxley SC
Third Round (Round of 16)	Singapore Football League 1	Singapore Cricket Club
Third Round (Round of 16)	Singapore Football League 1	Singapore Khalsa Association
Third Round (Round of 16)	Singapore Football League 1	South Avenue SC
Third Round (Round of 16)	Singapore Football League 1	Tengah FC

== Format ==
The competition is based on a single-leg knockout system with 30 teams from Singapore Football League 2 (SFL2) and Island Wide League (IWL) playing in the first round.

In the event the scores are tied after ninety (90) minutes of regulation time, except the Final Match, the winner shall be decided by penalties.

For the Final Match, if the scores are tied after regulation time, thirty (30) minutes of extra time (two halves of fifteen (15) minutes each) shall be played. Only if the scores are still tied after extra time, the winner shall then be decided by penalties.

2025 Singapore FA Cup Champions Warwick Knights have been given a bye to the second round of the competition, while the SFL1 teams will advance to the Third round directly.

== Bracket ==
The tournament bracket is shown below, with bold denoting the winners of each match.

Round of 16
September 5 – Jurong East
**Tengah FC**	**3**
Frenz GDT Circuit	1
September 5 – Jurong East
**South Avenue**	**6**
Kaki Bukit	3
September 6 – Choa Chu Kang
**Project Vaults Oxley**	**5**
Tanah Merah United	1
September 6 – Choa Chu Kang
**Police SA**	**1**
Warwick Knights	0
September 5 – Choa Chu Kang
**Bishan Barx**	**1**
Katong FC	0
September 5 – Choa Chu Kang
**Jungfrau Punggol**	**2**
Admiralty CSN	1
September 6 – Jurong East
Singapore Cricket Club	0
**Gymkhana Gaulois**	**1**
September 6 – Jurong East
**Singapore Khalsa Assoc.**	**4**
Bedok South Avenue	1

Quarterfinals
September 13 – Jurong East
Tengah FC	2
**South Avenue**	**3**
September 13 – Jurong East
Project Vaults Oxley	2
**Police SA**	**4**
September 13 – Bedok
**Bishan Barx**	**4**
Jungfrau Punggol	1
September 13 – Bedok
**Gymkhana Gaulois**	**5**
Singapore Khalsa Assoc.	0

Semifinals
October 4 – Jurong East
South Avenue	3
**Police SA**	**4**
October 4 – Jurong East
Bishan Barx	0
**Gymkhana Gaulois**	**3**

Final
TBC – Jurong East
Police SA
Gymkhana Gaulois
Third-place Playoff
TBC – Jurong East
South Avenue
Bishan Barx

== Fixtures and results ==
=== First Round ===
22 August 2026 M01	Frenz GDT Circuit	3-1	Singapore Xin Hua	Choa Chu Kang Stadium
17:00 UTC+8	Khairul Nizam; Faiz Zulfadhly	Report

22 August 2026 M02	Tiong Bahru	1-2	GFA Petir	Bukit Gombak Stadium
19:30 UTC+8

22 August 2026 M03	Eastern Thunder	4-1	Pasirian Lions	Yishun Stadium
17:00 UTC+8	Goal	Report	Syahmi; Xavier; Ilhan

22 August 2026 M04	Westwood El’Junior	2-3	Katong	Bukit Gombak Stadium
17:00 UTC+8	Goal	Report	Mukadam Afaan; Johnathan Yeo; Zhafir Shah

22 August 2026 M05	Mattar Sailors	1-2	Woodlands Rangers	Yishun Stadium
19:30 UTC+8		Report	Riz; Izuwan

22 August 2026 M06	Kaki Bukit	3-0	Simei United	Choa Chu Kang Stadium
19:30 UTC+8

23 August 2026 M07	Woodlands Lions	2-1	Eunos Crescent	Bedok Stadium
19:30 UTC+8	Sam; Joshua

23 August 2026 M08	Gymkhana Gaulois	6-0	Singapore Recreation Club	Yishun Stadium
17:00 UTC+8	Hazzuwan Halim 15'; Amirul Walid 28'; Binane Ayoub 73', 83'; Bawantha Buddhika 88'; Khairul Amri 90'	Report

23 August 2026 M09	Starlight Soccerites	3-4	Bedok South Avenue	Choa Chu Kang Stadium
19:30 UTC+8

23 August 2026 M10	GFA Victoria	3-0; Awarded	Sembawang City	Bukit Gombak Stadium
17:00 UTC+8
Note: Sembawang City failed to maintain the required minimum of two Under-23 Singaporean players on the field.

23 August 2026 M11	Sembawang Park Rangers	0-3; Awarded	Ayer Rajah Gryphons	Yishun Stadium
19:30 UTC+8
Note: Sembawang Park Rangers failed to maintain the required minimum of two Under-23 Singaporean players on the field.

23 August 2026 M12	Geylang Serai	0-5	Jurong City	Bukit Gombak Stadium
19:30 UTC+8

23 August 2026 M13	Admiralty CSN	3-1	Bukit Timah	Bedok Stadium
17:00 UTC+8

23 August 2026 M14	Yishun Mariners	9-0	East Dragon	Yishun Stadium
17:00 UTC+8	Zulkiffli Hassim; Noor Akid; Aloy; Ryson	Report

23 August 2026 M15	Winchester Isla	2-3	Tanah Merah United	Choa Chu Kang Stadium
17:00 UTC+8			Danial Zulkifli; Irfan Sazali; Kenny Kamil

=== Second Round ===
30 August 2026 M16	Frenz GDT Circuit	2-0	Woodlands Lions	Choa Chu Kang Stadium
17:00 UTC+8	Irfan Asrul; Zuhaili Suib	Report

30 August 2026 M17	Eastern Thunder	0-3	Katong	Bukit Gombak Stadium
17:00 UTC+8

30 August 2026 M18	Kaki Bukit	2-2 (3-2 p)	Woodlands Rangers	Yishun Stadium
17:00 UTC+8		Report	Krishna

30 August 2026 M19	GFA Petir	0-1	Admiralty CSN	Woodlands Stadium
17:00 UTC+8			Risen 13'

30 August 2026 M20	Yishun Mariners	0-0 (2-3 p)	Tanah Merah United	Choa Chu Kang Stadium
19:30 UTC+8		Report
	Penalties
	Penalty scored		(penalty scored) Rezza Rezky; (penalty scored) Fino Sainal; (penalty scored) Shahrul Mizan

30 August 2026 M21	GFA Victoria	0-5	Gymkhana Gaulois	Woodlands Stadium
19:30 UTC+8			Amirul Walid; Hazzuwan Halim; (o.g.); Khairul Amri

30 August 2026 M22	Ayer Rajah Gryphons	1-2	Warwick Knights	Yishun Stadium
19:30 UTC+8	Amjad Mubash 23'	Report	Fareez Farhan 42'; Izam Dan 60'

30 August 2026 M23	Bedok South Avenue	1-1	Jurong City	Bukit Gombak Stadium
19:30 UTC+8

=== Third Round ===
5 September 2026 M24	Tengah	3-1	Frenz GDT Circuit	Jurong East Stadium
17:00 UTC+8	Goal		Amy Recha

5 September 2026 M25	South Avenue	6-3	Kaki Bukit	Jurong East Stadium
19:30 UTC+8	Goal		Sharul Shah

5 September 2026 M26	Jungfrau Punggol	2-1	Admiralty CSN	Choa Chu Kang Stadium
19:30 UTC+8	Nur Luqman; Haikal Sukri	Report	Goal

5 September 2026 M27	Bishan Barx	1-0	Katong FC	Choa Chu Kang Stadium
17:00 UTC+8	Asshukrie Wahid 60'	Report

6 September 2026 M28	Project Vaults Oxley	5-1	Tanah Merah United	Choa Chu Kang Stadium
17:00 UTC+8	Roy Tan; Wai Loon; Justin Khiang; Rhys Henry	Report	Kenny Kamil

6 September 2026 M29	Police SA	1-0	Warwick Knights	Choa Chu Kang Stadium
17:30 UTC+8

6 September 2026 M30	Singapore Cricket Club	0-1	Gymkhana Gaulois	Bedok Stadium
17:00 UTC+8		Report	Khairul Amri

6 September 2026 M31	Singapore Khalsa Association	4-1	Bedok South Avenue	Bedok Stadium
17:30 UTC+8

=== Quarter Finals ===
13 September 2026 QF1	Tengah FC	2-3	South Avenue	Jurong East Stadium
17:00 UTC+8

13 September 2026 QF2	Bishan Barx	4-1	Jungfrau Punggol	Bedok Stadium
17:00 UTC+8	Aliff S. 13'; Fazli S. 25'; Shah M. 72'; Sahffee J. 90+10' (pen.)	Report	Maxime Yves 21' (pen.)

13 September 2026 QF3	Project Vaults Oxley	2-4	Police SA	Jurong East Stadium
19:30 UTC+8	Rhys Henry; Roy Tan	Report	Goal

13 September 2026 QF4	Gymkhana Gaulois	5-0	Singapore Khalsa Association	Bedok Stadium
19:#0 UTC+8	Amirul Walid; Fariz Faizal

=== Semi Finals ===
4 October 2026 SF1	South Avenue	3-4	Police SA	Jurong East Stadium
17:00 UTC+8	Goal		Ilhan Noor

4 October 2026 SF2	Bishan Barx	0-3	Gymkhana Gaulois	Jurong East Stadium
19:30 UTC+8			Hazzuwan Halim; Fariz Faizal; Khairul Amri

=== Third-place Playoff ===
17 October 2026 (Note: Match postponed due to haze situation in Singapore) M38	South Avenue	P-P	Bishan Barx	Jurong East Stadium
17:00 UTC+8
Note: Match postponed due to haze situation in Singapore.

=== Final ===
17 October 2026 M39	Police SA	P-P	Gymkhana Gaulois	Jurong East Stadium
19:30 UTC+8
Note: Match postponed due to haze situation in Singapore.

== Top goalscorers ==
As of 13 September 2026

Rank	Player	Club	Goals
1	(Singapore) Muhammad Amirul Bin Walid	Gymkhana Gaulois FC	5
2	(Singapore) Muhammad Zulkiffli Bin Hassim	Yishun Mariners FC	4
2	(Singapore) Muhammad Sharul Shah Bin Mohd Alsah	Kaki Bukit SC	4
2	(Singapore) Mohammad Khairul Amri Bin Mohammad Kamal	Gymkhana Gaulois FC	4
3	(Singapore) Mohammed Irfan Shadat	Jurong City FC	3
3	(Singapore) Noor Akid Bin Nordin	Yishun Mariners FC	3
3	(Singapore) Roy Tan	Project Vaults Oxley SC	3
3	(Singapore) Mohammad Hazzuwan bin Mohammad Halim	Gymkhana Gaulois FC	3
3	(Singapore) Ilhan Noor	Police SA	3
3	(Singapore) Fariz Faizal	Gymkhana Gaulois FC	3

Source: FAS FA Cup

== See also ==
- 2026 Island Wide League
