= 2022 Island Wide League =

Island Wide League
- Season: 2022
- Champions: Singapore Xin Hua
- Promoted: Singapore Xin Hua; Kaki Bukit SC
- Matches played: 37
- Top goalscorer: Zuhaili Suib (7 goals)

The 2022 Island Wide League is the 2022 season of the FAS Island Wide League (IWL), the fourth-tier Men's amateur football league in Singapore.

== Summary ==
2022 Island Wide League is set to kick off on 17 September after a two-year absence due to the coronavirus pandemic. The tournament will see 20 clubs – four more than the last edition – competing from September to November 2022.

GFA Victoria FC and Kaki Bukit SC were relegated from the SFL in the previous edition, while East Coast United, Tanah Merah United and Marsiling Causeway Bay FC will feature in the IWL for the first time.

Singapore Xin Hua won the 2022 IWL title by beating Kaki Bukit SC 2–0 in the final on 3 December 2022 at Jalan Besar Stadium. SXHFC became the 10th winner of the competition and finished their campaign with a 100 per cent record, having won all seven of their games.

As the top two teams in the league, both Singapore Xin Hua and Kaki Bukit SC will be promoted to the FAS SFL 2 for 2023 season.

GDT Circuit forward Zuhaili Suib is the league’s Top Scorer having finished the season with seven goals.

== Competition format ==
Teams have been split into five groups of four for the single round-robin group stage before the winner of each group, together with the three best second-placed teams, will proceed to the single-legged knock-out stage.

All clubs can register up to 25 players per team and must include at least six Under-23 local players in their registered roster. Only a maximum of two foreign players (including Singapore Permanent Residents) may be registered.

== Group stage ==
=== Group A ===
Pos	Team	Pld	W	D	L	GF	GA	GD	Pts
1	Bukit Timah FC (Q)	3	3	0	0	10	3	+7	9
2	GDT Circuit FC (Q)	3	2	0	1	16	4	+12	6
3	Woodlands United FC	3	1	0	2	6	11	−5	3
4	Verde Cresta Combined SC	3	0	0	3	2	16	−14	0

Source: fas.org.sg
Rules for classification: 1) points; 2) goal difference; 3) number of goals scored; 4) number of wins
(Q) Qualified for the phase indicated

1 October 2022	Verde Cresta Combined	0-4	Woodlands United	Jalan Besar Stadium
17:00 UTC+8

1 October 2022	GDT Circuit	1-2	Bukit Timah FC	Jalan Besar Stadium
UTC+8	Namsang Rai		Farhan	Player of the Match: Nafis

15 October 2022	Bukit Timah FC	3-1	Woodlands United	Choa Chu Kang Stadium
17:00 UTC+8	Iqbal; Nafis; Zul			Player of the Match: Izuwan

15 October 2022	GDT Circuit	7-1	Verde Cresta Combined	Clementi Stadium
17:00 UTC+8	Zuhaili Suib; Syariful Haq; Ekshang Limbu; Asnol As'at	Report	Hilman

13 November 2023	Bukit Timah FC	5-1	Verde Cresta Combined	Bukit Gombak Stadium
17:00 UTC+8	Feeq; Farhan; Izuwan; Faizal; Dzak			Player of the Match: Feeq

13 November 2022	Woodlands United FC	1-8	GDT Circuit FC	Serangoon Stadium
UTC+8	Goal	Report	Zuhaili Suib; Farizal Basri; Nurhalis Azmi; Ekshang Limbu; Asnol As'at

=== Group B ===
Pos	Team	Pld	W	D	L	GF	GA	GD	Pts
1	Singapore Xin Hua SC (Q)	3	3	0	0	4	1	+3	9
2	GFA Victoria FC (Q)	3	2	0	1	5	2	+3	6
3	Marsiling Causeway Bay FC	3	1	0	2	2	3	−1	3
4	Winchester Isla FC	3	0	0	3	1	6	−5	0

Source: fas.org.sg
Rules for classification: 1) points; 2) goal difference; 3) number of goals scored; 4) number of wins
(Q) Qualified for the phase indicated

2 October 2022	Winchester Isla	0-1	Singapore Xin Hua	Bedok Stadium
UTC+8

2 October 2022	GFA Victoria	1-0	Marsiling Causeway Bay	Clementi Stadium
17:00 UTC+8
Note: Match abandoned on the 86th minute due to increment weather.

16 October 2022	Marsiling Causeway Bay	0-1	Singapore Xin Hua	Woodlands Stadium
17:00 UTC+8

16 October 2022	GFA Victoria	3-0	Winchester Isla	Clementi Stadium
UTC+8

13 November 2022	Marsiling Causeway Bay	2-1	Winchester Isla	Bukit Gombak Stadium
UTC+8

13 November 2022	Singapore Xin Hua	2-1	GFA Victoria	Clementi Stadium
UTC+8

=== Group C ===
Pos	Team	Pld	W	D	L	GF	GA	GD	Pts
1	East Coast United FC (Q)	3	2	1	0	7	3	+4	7
2	Yishun FC	3	1	2	0	6	5	+1	5
3	Prisons SRC	3	1	0	2	9	6	+3	3
4	Pasirian Lions FC	3	0	1	2	3	11	−8	1

Source: fas.org.sg
Rules for classification: 1) points; 2) goal difference; 3) number of goals scored; 4) number of wins
(Q) Qualified for the phase indicated

25 September 2022	Prisons SRC	7-1	Pasirian Lions	Bedok Stadium
UTC+8

25 September 2022	East Coast United	2-2	Yishun FC	Clementi Stadium
19:30 UTC+8	Hazikir; Danny	Report		Player of the Match: Aizad

9 October 2022	Pasirian Lions	1-3	East Coast United	Woodlands Stadium
UTC+8

30 October 2022	Yishun FC	1-1	Pasirian Lions	Serangoon Stadium
17:00 UTC+8

30 October 2022	Prisons SRC	0-2	East Coast United	Bukit Gombak Stadium
UTC+8

6 November 2022	Yishun FC	3-2	Prison SRC	Bukit Gombak Stadium
UTC+8

=== Group D ===
Pos	Team	Pld	W	D	L	GF	GA	GD	Pts
1	Tanah Merah United FC (Q)	3	3	0	0	16	2	+14	9
2	Bedok South Avenue SC (Q)	3	2	0	1	11	4	+7	6
3	Woodlands Rangers FC	3	1	0	2	6	7	−1	3
4	Woodlands Warriors FC	3	0	0	3	2	22	−20	0

Source: fas.org.sg
Rules for classification: 1) points; 2) goal difference; 3) number of goals scored; 4) number of wins
(Q) Qualified for the phase indicated

24 September 2022	Bedok South Avenue	7-1	Woodlands Warriors	Choa Chu Kang Stadium
19:30 UTC+8	Basit Hamid 25', 70'; Rudy 41'; Jumari 54', 60'; Murzani 65'; Hakim 88'	Report	Ryan 33' (pen.)

25 September 2022	Woodlands Rangers	1-3	Tanah Merah United	Clementi Stadium
17:00 UTC+8	Surya Vijayan 88'	Report	Iswandi Shahrin 56', 80'; Affan Syahin 85'

8 October 2022	Woodlands Warriors	1-5	Woodlands Rangers	Clementi Stadium
17:00 UTC+8			Daniel 6', 51'; Shannel 14', 26'; Reimy 20'

9 October 2022	Tanah Merah United	3-1	Bedok South Avenue	Jalan Besar Stadium
17:00 UTC+8	Khairulnizam 19', 90+1'; Aravindhan 45+2'	Report	Khairulnizam 39' (pen.)

6 November 2022	Bedok South Avenue	3-0	Woodlands Rangers	Woodlands Stadium
17:00 UTC+8	Muzzammil 9'; Hakim 23'; Jumari 81'	Report

6 November 2022	Tanah Merah United	10-0	Woodlands Warriors	Woodlands Stadium
UTC+8

=== Group E ===
Pos	Team	Pld	W	D	L	GF	GA	GD	Pts
1	Kaki Bukit SC (Q)	3	2	1	0	7	3	+4	7
2	Geylang Serai FC	3	1	1	1	5	5	0	4
3	Simei United FC	3	1	0	2	4	5	−1	3
4	Gymkhana FC	3	1	0	2	5	8	−3	3

Source: fas.org.sg
Rules for classification: 1) points; 2) goal difference; 3) number of goals scored; 4) number of wins
(Q) Qualified for the phase indicated

24 September 2022	Gymkhana	2-1	Simei United	Choa Chu Kang Stadium
UTC+8

8 October 2022	Simei United	2-3	Kaki Bukit	Choa Chu Kang Stadium
UTC+8

16 October 2022	Kaki Bukit	3-0	Gymkhana	Woodlands Stadium
UTC+8

30 October 2022	Simei United	1-0	Geylang Serai	Bedok Stadium
UTC+8

13 November 2022	Geylang Serai	4-3	Gymkhana	Jalan Besar Stadium
UTC+8

13 November 2022	Kaki Bukit	1-1	Geylang Serai	Jalan Besar Stadium
UTC+8

== Knock-out stage ==
=== Quarter finals ===
20 November 2022	Bukit Timah FC	1-2	Kaki Bukit SC	Bedok Stadium
17:00 UTC+8	Farhan			Player of the Match: Haniffa

20 November 2022	Tanah Merah United	1-1 (4–3 p)	East Coast United	Serangoon Stadium
17:00 UTC+8				Player of the Match: Ridhwan Aziman

20 November 2022	GDT Circuit	2-2 (1-3 p)	Bedok South Avenue	Bedok Stadium
19:30 UTC+8	Syariful 3'; Zuhaili Suib 10'	Report	Jaslee 61'; Basit 70'
	Penalties
	Syaiful Iskandar (penalty scored)		Penalty scored

20 November 2022	GFA Victoria	0-2	Singapore Xin Hua	Serangoon Stadium
19:30 UTC+8

=== Semi finals ===
27 November 2022	Kaki Bukit SC	2-1	Tanah Merah United	Jalan Besar Stadium

27 November 2022	Bedok South Avenue	1-1 (5–6 p)	Singapore Xin Hua	Jalan Besar Stadium
19:30 UTC+8

=== Finals ===
3 December 2022	Kaki Bukit SC	0-2	Singapore Xin Hua	Jalan Besar Stadium
17:30 UTC+8		Report	Navin Mohan 6'; Wan Hazmi 29'

== Awards ==
=== Top scorers ===
As of 16 Nov 2022

Rank	Player	Club	Goals
1	Zuhaili Suib	GDT Circuit FC	7
2	Syed Abdul Hafiz	Tanah Merah United	4
2	Aravindhan Ramanathan	Tanah Merah United	4
2	Izzat Ishamuddin	Tanah Merah United	4

Source: footballleaguesofsingapore/IG

== See also ==
- Football in Singapore
- Football Association of Singapore
- 2022 Singapore Premier League
- 2022 Singapore Football League
