= Gymkhana Gaulois FC =

Singaporean football club

- Full name: Gymkhana Gaulois Football Club
- Nickname: The Stallions
- Founded: 2002; 24 years ago
- Owner: Nasriddin Akbar Fahmi Omar
- Chairman: Yasir Nazrul Nasriddin Akbar
- League: Island Wide League
- 2025: Champions

Gymkhana Gaulois Football Club, formerly known as Gymkhana Football Club, is an amateur Singaporean football club founded in 2002 and is affiliated to the Football Association of Singapore (FAS).

The club officially changed their name from Gymkhana FC to Gymkhana Gaulois FC with effect from 22 January 2026.

== History ==
In 2017, Gymkhana FC won the National Football League (NFL) Division 2 title and will be promoted to NFL Division One for the next season.

However, Gymkhana FC made the new for the wrong reasons. On 21 October 2018, a referee was allegedly hit in the face by their player Jufri Hassan after being sent off in the match against Katong FC. The player received a life ban from the FAS.

The club was later expelled from the NFL in December 2018 as they were unable to field 11 players at the point of kick-off on three separate occasions in the course of the competition.

Gymkhana returned to football in 2019 when they participated in Singapore Island Wide League (IWL). They finished 4th after losing to Bedok South Avenue SC in the third-fourth playoff.

Gymkhana sealed their first-ever IWL title after defeating Tanah Merah United 3-2 in the 2025 Island Wide League final on 30 August 2025. The two finalists would be promoted to 2026 SFL Division 2.

Gymkhana FC is officially renamed as Gymkhana Gaulois Football Club from 22 January 2026. This is due to the collaboration between Gaulois Sports Club and Gymkhana FC.

== Current squad ==
=== First-team squad ===
As of 23 Aug 2026

Note: Flags indicate national team as defined under FIFA eligibility rules; some limited exceptions apply. Players may hold more than one non-FIFA nationality.

No.	Pos.	Nation	Player
1	GK	SGP	Indra Ashriq
3	DF	SGP	Shahrin Saberin
4		SGP	Naufal Ismail
5		SGP	Asvidiq Sukarto
6	MF	SGP	Umar Ramle
8	MF	SGP	Shahdan Sulaiman
9		SGP	Herath Nishantha
10		SGP	Shahrukh Faizal
11	FW	SGP	Khairul Amri
13		SGP	Daniel Sham
14		SGP	Syahmi Tahir
15	DF	SGP	Faizal Roslan
16	FW	SGP	Iqbal Hussain
17		SGP	Fariz Faizal
18		SGP	Rasul Razali

No.	Pos.	Nation	Player
19	FW	SGP	Amirul Walid
21		SGP	Binane Ayoub
22		SGP	Sadik Said
23		SGP	Shabir Kassim
24		SGP	Al Harith Majid
29		SGP	Joel Loh
30		SGP	Haidil Sufian Rosli
31	GK	SGP	Zaiful Nizam
34		SGP	Mehdi Boumaaz
55		SGP	Iqbaal Yusri
68		SGP	Farisy Danial Khair
70		SGP	Karthigaya Varmaa
77	FW	SGP	Hazzuwan Halim
88	MF	SGP	Firdaus Kasman
99		SGP	Muruganandam

== Current season ==
=== Pre-season ===
30 May 2026 Friendly	Kuala Lumpur FA	5-3	Gymkhana Gaulois	Selangor, Malaysia
17:00 UTC+8		Report		Stadium: Stadium MPS; Attendance: 0

6 Aug 2026 Friendly	Klang City Sailors	4-0	Gymkhana Gaulois	Kuala Lumpur, Malaysia
20:00 UTC+8		Report		Stadium: MBSJ Stadium

8 Aug 2026 Friendly	HE Clinic FC	3-4	Gymkhana Gaulois	Kuala Lumpur, Malaysia
20:00 UTC+8		Report		Stadium: TAR UMT Stadium

=== Singapore Football League 2 ===
Pos	Team	Pld	W	D	L	GF	GA	GD	Pts
1	Gymkhana Gaulois FC	4	4	0	0	28	3	+25	12
2	Frenz GDT Circuit FC	5	4	0	1	20	11	+9	12
3	Tanah Merah United	4	2	2	0	12	5	+7	8
4	Katong FC	4	2	1	1	5	5	0	7
5	GFA Victoria FC	4	2	0	2	5	12	−7	6
6	Warwick Knights FC	4	1	1	2	6	7	−1	4
7	Admiralty CSN	5	1	1	3	5	20	−15	4
8	Starlight Soccerites	5	1	0	4	8	12	−4	3
9	Kaki Bukit SC	4	1	0	3	5	13	−8	3
10	Yishun Mariners FC	3	0	1	2	4	10	−6	1

Updated to match(es) played on 1 November 2026. Source: Football Association of Singapore
Rules for classification: 1) points; 2) goal difference; 3) number of goals scored; 4) number of wins

=== Singapore FA Cup ===
23 Aug 2026 Round 1	Gymkhana Gaulois	6-0	Singapore Recreation Club	Yishun Stadium
17:00 UTC+8	Hazzuwan Halim 15'; Amirul Walid 28'; Binane Ayoub 73', 83'; Bawantha Buddhika 88'; Khairul Amri 90'	Report

30 Aug 2026 Round 2	GFA Victoria	0-5	Gymkhana Gaulois	Woodlands Stadium
19:30 UTC+8			Amirul Walid; Hazzuwan Halim; (o.g.); Khairul Amri

6 Sep 2026 Round 3	Singapore Cricket Club	0-1	Gymkhana Gaulois	Bedok Stadium
17:00 UTC+8			Khairul Amri

13 Sep 2026 QF4	Gymkhana Gaulois	5-0	Singapore Khalsa Assoc.	Bedok Stadium
19:#0 UTC+8	Amirul Walid

4 Oct 2026 SF2	Bishan Barx	0-3	Gymkhana Gaulois	Jurong East Stadium
19:30 UTC+8			Hazzuwan Halim; Fariz Faizal; Khairul Amri

17 Oct 2026 Final	Police SA	P-P	Gymkhana Gaulois	Jurong East Stadium
19:30 UTC+8
Note: Match postponed due to haze situation in Singapore.

== Achievements ==
- National Football League Division 2

Champion: 2017

- Island Wide League

Champion: 2025

== Past seasons ==
=== Domestic Leagues ===
Year	League	Position	Pld	W	D	L	GF	GA	GD	Pts	Status
2017	NFL Division 2	1st	20	14	4	2	66	21	45	46	Champions
2018	NFL Division 1	-	0	0	0	0	0	0	0	0	Expelled from FAS NFL
2019	IWL Group B	2nd	3	2	0	1	5	8	-3	6	Finished 4th
Competition not held from 2020 to 2021
2022	IWL Group E	4th	3	1	0	2	9	4	5	3	
2023	IWL Group C	2nd	3	1	1	1	4	4	0	4	Did not made it to the Playoff
2024	IWL Group B	1st	6	6	0	0	17	5	+12	18	Reached Semi-finals
2025	IWL Group A	1st	6	5	1	0	24	2	+22	16	Champions
2026-27	SFL Division 2	-	0	0	0	0	0	0	0	0	

=== Singapore FA Cup ===
Year	Results
2018	Did not participate
2019	First Round
Competition not held from 2020 to 2022
2023	Third Round
Competition not held in 2024
2025	Third Round
2026	

== See also ==
- List of football clubs in Singapore
