= Woodlands Lions FC =

- Full name: Woodlands Lions Football Club
- Founded: 2017; 9 years ago
- Chairman: R. Vengadasalam
- Head coach: Thet Ko Ko Oo
- League: Island Wide League
- 2025: IWL, 7th of 7 (Group C)

Woodlands Lions Football Club is an amateur football team based in Woodlands, Singapore. The club was founded in 2017 by Singaporean football icon R. Vengadasalam.

The age-group teams are active in the Singapore Youth League, while the senior team placed fifth of thte seven teams in Group A of the 2026 Island Wide League.

== History ==
Woodlands Lions FC was founded in 2017 by Singaporean football icon R. Vengadasalam. After feeling disappointment with the lack of support, ideas and vision from clubs and individuals, Venga decided to start this Woodlands Lions FC project.

When they first started, Woodlands Lions FC was a youth team comprising players who have a lack of opportunities to play football in their respective schools. Venga’s talent discovery process is mainly based in the northern part of Singapore. The club have since competed in various age-group competitions, including the Singapore Youth League.

In 2025, the club's senior team made its debut in the Island Wide League (IWL), officially sanctioned by the Football Association of Singapore (FAS). The 2025 IWL team was led by head coach Thet Ko Ko Oo, assistant coach Gautam Butalia, and team captain Saw Shalom Haythaw. Although the debutant did not secure a single win, they came close to drawing several matches, with most games ending in a narrow 2–1 defeat. The club also fields a futsal team that competes in the Kyna Futsal League.

== Current season ==
=== 2025 Island Wide League Table ===
Group C

Pos	Team	Pld	W	D	L	GF	GA	GD	Pts
1	Sembawang City FC (Q)	6	6	0	0	22	5	+17	18
2	Bukit Timah FC (Q)	6	4	0	2	11	11	0	12
3	Eastern Thunder FC	6	3	1	2	17	9	+8	10
4	Tessensohn Khalsa Rovers	6	3	0	3	11	15	−4	9
5	Ayer Rajah Gryphons FC	6	2	2	2	10	11	−1	8
6	Pasirian Lions FC	6	1	1	4	6	13	−7	4
7	Woodlands Lions FC	6	0	0	6	7	20	−13	0

Updated to match(es) played on 26 Jul 2025. Source: fas.org.sg
Rules for classification: 1) points; 2) goal difference; 3) number of goals scored; 4) number of wins
(Q) Qualified for Quarter-finals.

== Past seasons ==
=== Leagues ===
Season	League	Pos	Pld	W	D	L	GF	GA	GD	Pts	Remarks
2025	IWL	6th	6	0	0	6	7	20	-13	0	
2026	IWL	Did not participate									

=== Cups ===
Season	Cup	Progress
2025	FAS FA Cup	First Round
2026	FAS FA Cup	
