= 2023 Singapore FA Cup =

2023 Football Association Cup
Singapore FA Cup

Tournament details
- Country: Singapore
- Dates: 30 September 2023 – 19 November 2023
- Teams: 37

Final positions
- Champions: Yishun Sentek Mariners
- Runners-up: Singapore Khalsa Association
- Third place: South Avenue SC

Tournament statistics
- Matches played: 37
- Top goal scorer(s): Juma'at Jantan (8 goals)
- (Note: All statistics do not include penalty shoot-outs)

The 2023 Singapore FA Cup is the latest season of the FAS FA Cup, which is open to all teams from Singapore Football League (SFL) and Island Wide League (IWL) in Singapore.

SFL 1 team Tiong Bahru FC are the defending champions, having defeated 2018 champions Yishun Sentek Mariners FC in the 2019 season's final.

The historic cup competition which started in 1996, made a return in 2023 after being briefly halted for three years due to the COVID-19 pandemic.

On 19 November 2023, Syahiram Miswan secures the Cup for Yishun Sentek Mariners FC with a late penalty in the thrilling 2023 FA Cup Final. The champions received $10,000 prize money and the FA Cup trophy from Football Association of Singapore President Mr Bernard Tan and General Secretary at the Jalan Besar Stadium.

== Teams ==
The Singapore FA Cup is a knockout competition with 28 teams taking part from the first round. The competition will consist of the 37 teams from the Singapore Football League system (18 teams in total from the Singapore Football League 1 and 2, and 19 teams from the Island Wide League).

== First Round ==
19 Island Wide League teams and 9 SFL 2 teams will play in the first two rounds of the 2023 Singapore FA Cup. Newly crowned 2023 SFL 2 Champions Police SA will advance directly to the Third Round.

30 September 2023	Verde Cresta Combined	0-6	Singapore Xin Hua	Yishun Stadium

30 September 2023	Geylang Serai FC	1-3	Marsiling Causeway Bay	Jurong East Stadium

30 September 2023	Woodlands Rangers	2-2(p)	Prisons SRC	Yishun Stadium

1 October 2023	South Avenue SC	15-1	Simei United	Bukit Gombak Stadium
			Hidayat 78'

1 October 2023	Yishun FC	0-5	Eunos Crescent FC	Clementi Stadium

1 October 2023	GFA Sporting Westlake	4-2	Balestier United RC	Woodlands Stadium

1 October 2023	Bukit Timah FC	1-2	Mattar Sailors FC	Jurong East Stadium
	Feeq

1 October 2023	Westwood El'Junior	1-3	Tanah Merah United	Serangoon Stadium

1 October 2023	GDT Circuit FC	4-1	Admiralty CSN	Bukit Gombak Stadium

8 October 2023	Tengah FC	12-1	Pasirian Lions FC	Clementi Stadium

8 October 2023	Bedok South Avenue SC	0-1	Bishan Barx FC	Jurong East Stadium

8 October 2023	East Coast United	1-0	GFA Victoria FC	Bukit Gombak Stadium

8 October 2023	Kaki Bukit SC	5-2	Starlight Soccerites	Clementi Stadium

8 October 2023	Winchester Isla	0-3	Gymkhana FC	Jurong East Stadium

== Second Round ==
14 October 2023	Bishan Barx FC	2-1	Marsiling Causeway Bay	Jurong East Stadium

14 October 2023	Prisons SRC	0-2	GDT Circuit FC	Toa Payoh Stadium

14 October 2023	Eunos Crescent FC	0-1	GFA Sporting Westlake	Jurong East Stadium

15 October 2023	Mattar Sailors FC	2-4	Singapore Xin Hua	Jurong East Stadium

15 October 2023	South Avenue SC	1-0	Tengah FC	Clementi Stadium

15 October 2023	Tanah Merah United	1-4	East Coast United	Jurong East Stadium

15 October 2023	Kaki Bukit SC	0-2	Gymkhana FC	Serangoon Stadium

== Third Round ==
Police SA* and 8 Teams from Singapore Football League 1 join the 7 winners of Second Round in the Third Round.

22 October 2023	Katong FC	1-0	Bishan Barx FC	Jurong East Stadium
17:00 UTC+8	Sherman Quek

21 October 2023	Singapore Cricket Club	2-1	Singapore Xin Hua	Jurong East Stadium
19:30 UTC+8	Timothy Tan; Nikesh Singh

22 October 2023	Jungfrau Punggol	1-1 (3–4 p)	East Coast United	Bukit Gombak Stadium
17:00 UTC+8

22 October 2023	Yishun Sentek Mariners	3-2	GDT Circuit FC	Clementi Stadium
17:00 UTC+8			Khairul Nizam; Basit Hamid

22 October 2023	Project Vaults Oxley	4-3	Police SA	Woodlands Stadium
17:00 UTC+8

22 October 2023	Singapore Khalsa Association	4-1	Gymkhana FC	Clementi Stadium
19:30 UTC+8

22 October 2023	Tiong Bahru FC	1-4	South Avenue SC	Woodlands Stadium
19:30 UTC+8

22 October 2023	Warwick Knights	1-1 (7–6 p)	GFA Sporting Westlake	Serangoon Stadium
19:30 UTC+8

== Quarter Finals ==
28 October 2023	Project Vaults Oxley	0-3	Singapore Khalsa Association	Bukit Gombak Stadium
17:00 UTC+8

28 October 2023	South Avenue SC	1-0	Warwick Knights	Yishun Stadium
17:00 UTC+8

28 October 2023	Katong FC	1-2	Singapore Cricket Club	Jurong East Stadium
17:00 UTC+8	Syafiq Bidin		Muhammad Hud; Muhammad Hud

28 October 2023	East Coast United	1-8	Yishun Sentek Mariners	Yishun Stadium
17:00 UTC+8

== Semi Finals ==
5 November 2023	Singapore Cricket Club	1-5	Yishun Sentek Mariners	Serangoon Stadium
19:00 UTC+8	Azizi

5 November 2023	Singapore Khalsa Association	1-0	South Avenue SC	Woodlands Stadium
19:00 UTC+8

== Third Placing ==
19 November 2023	Singapore Cricket Club	2-4	South Avenue SC	Jalan Besar Stadium
17:00 UTC+8

== Finals ==
19 November 2023	Yishun Sentek Mariners	3-2	Singapore Khalsa Association	Jalan Besar Stadium
20:00 UTC+8	Syahiram Miswan (pen.)

== Top goalscorers ==
As of 19 January 2024

Rank	Player	Club	Goals
1	(Singapore) Juma'at Jantan	South Avenue SC	8
2	(Singapore) Kenny Kamil	South Avenue SC	7
3	(Singapore) Khairul Nizam	GDT Circuit FC	6
