= Kaki Bukit SC =

Singaporean football club

- Full name: Kaki Bukit Sports Club
- General Manager: Clayton Tan Chong Kit
- Chairman: Isaac Tan Ng Leung
- Head Coach: Faizrul Yasir
- League: Singapore Football League
- 2025: League 2, 7th of 10

Kaki Bukit Sports Club is an amateur Singaporean football club based in Kaki Bukit, Singapore. The club is currently competing in the Singapore Football League 2.

== History ==
Kaki Bukit SC won the 3rd division (now known as Island Wide League) in 2006, and finish as runner-ups in the 2nd division (now known as Singapore Football League 2) in 2007 and 2010.

In 2013, the club started the Kaki Bukit Sports Club Academy, which were trained under ex-national team players like Malek Awab and football legend Majid Ariff. The academy has groomed many youngsters, including Ariesa Zahran, who have gone on to play in the professional leagues or national set-up.

In 2024, under a collaborative effort between the club and Team Ohana's management, Kaki Bukit SC will be sending a Women's team to participate in the Women's National League (Singapore).

== Current squad ==
=== Women's team ===
As of 27 Jan 2026

Note: Flags indicate national team as defined under FIFA eligibility rules; some limited exceptions apply. Players may hold more than one non-FIFA nationality.

No.	Pos.	Nation	Player
3		SGP	Anisah
5		SGP	Cess
6		SGP	Elis Ramlee
7		SGP	Lela (vice captain)
8		SGP	Mizah
10		SGP	Lulu
11		SGP	Chap
12		SGP	AJ (captain)
13		SGP	Azu
14		SGP	Shaz
16		SGP	Nadh

No.	Pos.	Nation	Player
17		SGP	Shida
18		SGP	Kiera
19		SGP	Sofia
21		SGP	Shaf
22		SGP	Sarrinah
24		SGP	Andrea
25	GK	SGP	Has
27	GK	SGP	Mira
29		SGP	Nurul
50	GK	SGP	Liza

== Current season ==
=== Singapore Football League 2 ===
==== League table ====
Pos	Team	Pld	W	D	L	GF	GA	GD	Pts
1	Frenz GDT Circuit FC	3	2	0	1	14	9	+5	6
2	Gymkhana Gaulois FC	2	2	0	0	7	2	+5	6
3	Tanah Merah United	2	1	1	0	6	2	+4	4
4	Katong FC	2	1	1	0	4	3	+1	4
5	Admiralty CSN	3	1	1	1	4	4	0	4
6	Kaki Bukit SC	2	1	0	1	4	3	+1	3
7	Warwick Knights FC	3	1	0	2	4	5	−1	3
8	GFA Victoria FC	2	1	0	1	3	8	−5	3
9	Yishun Mariners FC	2	0	1	1	2	6	−4	1
10	Starlight Soccerites	3	0	0	3	4	10	−6	0

Updated to match(es) played on 28 September 2026. Source: Football Association of Singapore
Rules for classification: 1) points; 2) goal difference; 3) number of goals scored; 4) number of wins

=== Women's National League ===
==== League table ====
Pos	Team	Pld	W	D	L	GF	GA	GD	Pts	Remarks
1	Lion City Sailors 'B' (Note: WPL 'B' teams participating in the WNL will not be eligible for promotion to the WPL next season.) (C)	13	13	0	0	82	5	+77	39	Champions
2	Frenz GDT Circuit FC (P)	13	10	0	3	54	27	+27	30	Promotion to Premier League
3	Still Aerion 'B'	13	9	0	4	30	15	+15	27	
4	Unity FC (Note: Unity FC will be promoted after defeating Tiong Bahru in a penalty shootout on 5 July 2026.) (P, O)	13	6	1	6	24	19	+5	19	Play-off with WPL 8th place
5	Katong FC	13	4	3	6	13	38	−25	15	
6	Jungfrau Punggol FC	13	7	0	6	25	26	−1	21	Bottom Tier (Note: Teams in 6th to 10th position after first round form the Bottom Tier)
7	Mattar Sailors FC	13	4	1	8	19	22	−3	13	Bottom Tier
8	Kaki Bukit SC	13	4	0	9	26	54	−28	12	Bottom Tier
9	Eastern Thunder FC	13	3	1	9	19	28	−9	10	Bottom Tier
10	SFA Combined Girls	13	2	0	11	7	65	−58	6	Bottom Tier

Source: FAS
Rules for classification: 1) points; 2) goal difference; 3) number of goals scored; 4) number of wins
(C) Champions; (O) Play-off winners; (P) Promoted

== Achievements ==
- National Football League (Division 2)

Runner-ups: 2007, 2010

- National Football League (Division 3)

Champions: 2006

== Past seasons ==
=== Men's competition ===
==== Leagues ====
Season	League	Pos	Pld	W	D	L	GF	GA	GD	Pts	Remarks
2017	NFL DIV 1	5th	20	9	2	9	32	24	+8	29	
2018	NFL DIV 2	5th	20	11	2	7	37	25	+12	35	
2019	NFL DIV 2	10th	14	3	4	7	17	25	-8	13	Relegated
Competition not held from 2020 to 2021
2022	IWL	1st	3	2	1	0	7	3	+4	7	2nd (Finalists)
2023	SFL 2	3rd	18	9	3	6	38	32	+6	30	
2024	SFL 2	5th	13	4	3	6	21	20	+1	15	
2025	SFL 2	7th	18	4	4	10	28	34	-6	16	
2026-27	SFL 2	-	0	0	0	0	0	0	0	0	

==== Cups ====
Season	Cup	Progress
2019	FAS FA Cup	Round of 16
Competition not held from 2020 to 2022
2023	FAS FA Cup	Second Round
Competition not held in 2024
2025	FAS FA Cup	Second Round
2026	FAS FA Cup	Third Round

=== Women's competition ===
Season	League	Pos	Pld	W	D	L	GF	GA	GD	Pts	Remarks
2024	WNL	6th	6	1	1	4	6	26	-20	4	
2025	WNL	5th	12	2	1	9	21	49	-28	7	
2026	WNL	8th	13	4	0	9	26	54	-28	12	

== See also ==
- List of Singapore's football leagues winners
