= 2025 Singapore Football League =

The 2025 Singapore Football League is the 49th season of the Singapore Football League. The league will feature promotion and relegation between football clubs in League 1, 2 and the Island Wide League.

The 2025 season kicked off with the 2025 SFL Challenge Cup between Singapore Khalsa Association and Singapore Cricket Club, held at the Jalan Besar Stadium on 13 April 2025.

== SFL Challenge Cup ==
13 April 2025	Singapore Khalsa Association	0–1	Singapore Cricket Club	Jalan Besar
18:00 UTC+8		Report	Gautam Selvamany 94'	Stadium: Jalan Besar Stadium

== League 1 ==
Singapore Football League 1
- Season: 2025
- Champions: Singapore Cricket Club
- Relegated: Katong FC; Yishun Sentek Mariners
- Matches: 56
- Goals: 209 (3.73 per match)
- Top goalscorer: Fariz Faizal (SKA) (11 goals)
- Highest scoring: SKA 5-6 Tengah (7 Sep 2025)
- All statistics correct as of 17 Sep 2025.

2025 Singapore Football League (SFL) 1 kicked off on 13 April 2025.

2024 SFL2 Champions Tengah FC and Runner-ups Jungfrau Punggol FC are promoted to the SFL 1 for the 2025 season.

Jungfrau Punggol FC made a swift return to the League 1 after being relegated in 2023. Tengah FC was promoted for 2 consecutive years to reach the League 1 for the first time.

The bottom two teams of the SFL 1 shall be relegated to the SFL 2 for the 2026 season.

Off the field, several Tengah FC players were suspended by the club after Toa Payoh coffee shop brawl with a deadly weapon on 24 August 2025.

Heading into the last round of fixtures on 7 September, Singapore Cricket Club (SCC), Jungfrau Punggol and Police were still in contention and victory was essential for any of the trio to keep their title hopes alive.

Both SCC and Jungfrau secure a win over Katong and Police respectively. However, SCC lifted the trophy for the first time since the SFL was restructured due to a better goal difference as compared to Jungfrau.

Singapore Khalsa Association’s Fariz Faizal topped the scoring standings with 11 goals, followed by Jungfrau’s Hairil Sufi with 10. Police’s Ilhan Noor and Jungfrau’s Liam Shotton finished joint-third with nine goals each.

=== League table ===
Pos	Team	Pld	W	D	L	GF	GA	GD	Pts
1	Singapore Cricket Club	14	10	2	2	32	10	+22	32
2	Jungfrau Punggol FC	14	10	2	2	34	21	+13	32
3	Police SA	14	8	4	2	28	14	+14	28
4	Singapore Khalsa Association	14	8	1	5	29	20	+9	25
5	Project Vaults Oxley SC	14	4	0	10	20	38	−18	12
6	Tengah FC	14	3	2	9	24	38	−14	11
7	Katong FC (R)	14	2	5	7	21	35	−14	11
8	Yishun Sentek Mariners (R)	14	2	2	10	21	33	−12	8

Source: Football Association of Singapore
Rules for classification: 1) points; 2) goal difference; 3) number of goals scored; 4) number of wins
(R) Relegated

=== Fixtures and results ===
Home \ Away	JPFC	KFC	PSA	PVO	SCC	SKA	TFC	YSFC
Jungfrau Punggol FC		4–4	1–0	3–1	1–3	2–1	3–2	3–1
Katong FC	1–4		2–2	4–2	0–2	0–2	2–2	2–1
Police SA	1–1	3–1		2–1	2–1	0–1	4–0	4–2
Project Vaults Oxley SC	1–3	4–2	1–3		0–3	0–2	2–1	3–2
Singapore Cricket Club	1–2	3–0	1–1	5–1		4–1	2–0	2–1
Singapore Khalsa Association	0–2	4–1	0–0	3–2	0–1		5–6	5–1
Tengah FC	3–1	1–1	2–5	1–2	0–3	1–3		1–2
Yishun Sentek Mariners	2–4	1–1	0–1	4–0	1–1	0–2	3–4	

Source: Football Association of Singapore
Legend: Blue = home team win; Yellow = draw; Red = away team win.

=== Top scorers ===
As of 7 Sep 2025

Rank	Player	Club	Goals
1	(Singapore) Fariz Faizal	Singapore Khalsa Association	11
2	(Singapore) Hairil Sufi	Jungfrau Punggol	10
3	(England) Liam Shotton	Jungfrau Punggol	9
3	(Singapore) Ilhan Noor	Police SA	9
4	(Singapore) Hazim Faiz	Singapore Cricket Club	8
5	(Spain) Sergio Moreno	Project Vaults Oxley	7
6	(Singapore) Zakaria Syari	Police SA	6
7	(Singapore) Zulkiffli Hassif	Yishun Sentek Mariners	5
7	(Singapore) Timothy Cheng	Singapore Cricket Club	5
8	(Singapore) Heng Jee Kuan	Katong FC	3
8	(Singapore) Hadi	Jungfrau Punggol	3

Source: Football Association of Singapore

=== Amateur Leagues Awards Night 2025 ===
The FAS will be hosting Amateur Leagues Awards Night Season 2025 on Friday, 17 January 2026, at the Raffles Town Club. The event will honour the outstanding individuals from the Singapore Football League (SFL 1 and 2), Women’s Premier League (WPL), and Women’s National League (WNL).

Award	Nominee	Club	Recipient
Player of the Year	Ilhan Noor	Police SA	Ilhan Noor
Player of the Year	Liam Shotton	Jungfrau Punggol	Ilhan Noor
Player of the Year	Sergio Moreno	Project Vaults Oxley	Ilhan Noor
Coach of the Year	Yahya Madon	Police SA	Yahya Madon
Coach of the Year	Nur Halis Shafik	Jungfrau Punggol	Yahya Madon
Coach of the Year	Steven Tan	Singapore Cricket Club	Yahya Madon
Golden Boot	Fariz Faizal (Singapore Khalsa Association)		
Fair Play Award	Police SA		

Source: fas.org.sg

== League 2 ==
Singapore Football League 2
- Season: 2025
- Champions: Bishan Barx
- Promoted: Bishan Barx; South Avenue
- Relegated: Westwood E'JC; Tiong Bahru
- Matches: 90
- Goals: 364 (4.04 per match)
- Top goalscorer: Amirul Walid (Warwick) (24 goals)
- Highest scoring: GDT 8-2 Tiong Bahru (18 May 2025)
- All statistics correct as of 17 Sep 2025.

2025 Singapore Football League (SFL) 2 kicked off on 13 April 2025.

Tiong Bahru and South Avenue was relegated from SFL 1 last season.

GDT Circuit and Westwood El'Junior were promoted from the 2024 Island Wide League (IWL) as Champions and Runner-ups respectively.

GFA Sporting Westlake was renamed as GFA Victoria for the upcoming season.

The top two teams of the SFL 2 shall be promoted to the SFL 1, while the bottom two teams of the SFL 2 shall be relegated to the IWL for the 2026 season.

Bishan Barx emerged as the 2025 Singapore Football League 2 (SFL2) champions for the first time after defeating Admiralty CSN 5-2 on 14 September 2025. Warwick Knights' Amirul Walid finished the season as the league’s top scorer with 24 goals.

=== League table ===
Pos	Team	Pld	W	D	L	GF	GA	GD	Pts
1	Bishan Barx FC (C)	18	14	3	1	55	13	+42	45
2	South Avenue SC (P)	18	14	2	2	49	11	+38	44
3	Warwick Knights FC	18	13	2	3	56	23	+33	41
4	GDT Circuit FC	18	9	2	7	41	39	+2	29
5	Starlight Soccerites FC	18	9	2	7	36	39	−3	29
6	Admiralty CSN	18	6	3	9	31	43	−12	21
7	Kaki Bukit SC	18	4	4	10	28	34	−6	16
8	GFA Victoria FC	18	4	3	11	24	53	−29	15
9	Westwood El'Junior FC	18	2	4	12	19	36	−17	10
10	Tiong Bahru FC (R)	18	1	3	14	25	73	−48	6

Source: Football Association of Singapore
Rules for classification: 1) points; 2) goal difference; 3) number of goals scored; 4) number of wins
(C) Champions; (P) Promoted; (R) Relegated

=== Fixtures and results ===
Home \ Away	ACSN	BBFC	GDT	GFV	KBSC	SASC	SSFC	TBFC	WEJC	WKFC
ACSN		2–5	3–5	2–1	2–2	0–1	0–4	5–0	1–1	1–4
BBFC	4–0		3–2	5–1	2–0	0–0	2–2	5–1	2–1	0–2
GDT	2–4	0–3		3–0	2–1	3–2	2–3	8–2	0–3	1–2
GFV	0–0	0–7	1–1		0–2	3–5	4–1	0–2	0–0	2–7
KBSC	3–0	0–4	1–2	2–3		0–3	1–2	2–2	0–0	2–2
SASC	2–0	1–1	4–0	7–1	2–1		1–0	6–0	5–0	1–0
SSFC	1–2	0–4	1–2	4–2	2–1	1–4		3–3	1–0	3–2
TBFC	2–5	1–3	1–2	2–4	2–4	0–4	2–3		1–2	1–8
WEJC	1–3	0–1	2–3	1–2	1–4	0–1	2–5	3–3		2–3
WKFC	5–1	0–4	3–3	2–0	3–2	1–0	5–0	6–0	1–0	

Source: Football Association of Singapore
Legend: Blue = home team win; Yellow = draw; Red = away team win.

=== Top scorers ===
As of 14 Sep 2025

Rank	Player	Club	Goals
1	(Singapore) Amirul Walid	Warwick Knights	24
2	(Singapore) Sahffee Jubpre	Bishan Barx	22
3	(Singapore) Izwan Abdul Rahman	Admiralty CSN	12
4	(Singapore) Sadik Said	Starlight Soccerites	9
5	(Singapore) Irwan Shah	GDT Circuit	7
6	(Singapore) Abdul Basit	GDT Circuit	6
6	(Singapore) Shahrulnizam	Bishan Barx	6
7	(Singapore) Farisy	Starlight Soccerites	5
7	(Singapore) Khairul Nizam	GDT Circuit	5

Source: Football Association of Singapore

=== Amateur Leagues Awards Night 2025 ===
Award	Nominee	Club	Recipient
Player of the Year	Amirul Walid	Warwick Knights	Amirul Walid
Player of the Year	Sahffee Jubpre	Bishan Barx	Amirul Walid
Player of the Year	Siddiq Durimi	South Avenue	Amirul Walid
Coach of the Year	Suwito Suma	Bishan Barx	Suwito Suma
Coach of the Year	Azahari Aziz	Warwick Knights	Suwito Suma
Coach of the Year	Irwan Shah	GDT Circuit	Suwito Suma
Golden Boot	Amirul Walid (Warwick Knights)		
Fair Play Award	Bishan Barx		

Source: fas.org.sg

== See also ==
- 2025 Island Wide League
- Singapore FA Cup
