= 2024 Singapore Football League =

The 2024 Singapore Football League is the 48th season of the Singapore Football League. The league will feature promotion and relegation between football clubs in League 1, 2 and the Island Wide League.

The season curtain raiser will be the 2024 SFL Challenge Cup between Singapore Khalsa Association and Yishun Sentek Mariners at the Jalan Besar Stadium on 21 July 2024, a repeat of 2023 Challenge Cup as well as FA Cup final.

With the Singapore Premier League transitioning to the European calendar in 2024-25, while the amateur leagues continue to follow the calendar year, the Football Association of Singapore decided to hold two separate awards events.

The inaugural Amateur Leagues Awards Night Season 2024 was held on 21 February 2025 at the SportSG Auditorium (BlackBox).

== SFL Challenge Cup ==
21 Jul 2024	Singapore Khalsa Association	1-0	Yishun Sentek Mariners	Jalan Besar
19:30 UTC+8	Fareez Farhan	Report		Stadium: Jalan Besar Stadium

== League 1 ==
Singapore Football League 1
- Season: 2024
- Champions: Singapore Khalsa Association FC
- Relegated: Tiong Bahru FC; South Avenue SC
- Matches: 56
- Longest winning run: 3 matches (SKA/Yishun Sentek)
- Longest unbeaten run: 6 matches (SCC/Police/YSM)
- Longest winless run: 7 matches (South Avenue)
- Longest losing run: 7 matches (South Avenue)
- All statistics correct as of 12 Nov 2024.

2024 Singapore Football League (SFL) 1 will kick off on 21 July 2024.

2023 season Champions Police SA and Runner-ups South Avenue SC are promoted to the SFL 1 for the 2024 season.

On 10 November 2024, Singapore Khalsa Association fought back from two goals down to earn a 2-2 draw against Tiong Bahru FC to seal their third consecutive SFL 1 title.

Tiong Bahru will be relegated with South Avenue after finishing 7th in the league, losing out to 6th-place Katong FC on goal difference.

=== League table ===
Pos	Team	Pld	W	D	L	GF	GA	GD	Pts	Qualification or relegation
1	Singapore Khalsa Association (C)	14	9	3	2	42	23	+19	30	2024 SFL 1 Champions
2	Singapore Cricket Club	14	8	4	2	30	13	+17	28	
3	Yishun Sentek Mariners	14	8	3	3	32	20	+12	27	
4	Police SA	14	5	6	3	21	15	+6	21	
5	Project Vaults Oxley SC	14	4	4	6	21	28	−7	16	
6	Katong FC	14	3	5	6	20	31	−11	14	
7	Tiong Bahru FC (R)	14	3	5	6	21	33	−12	14	Relegated to 2025 SFL 2
8	South Avenue SC (R)	14	1	0	13	17	41	−24	3	Relegated to 2025 SFL 2

Updated to match(es) played on 10 Nov 2024. Source: Football Association of Singapore
Rules for classification: 1) points; 2) goal difference; 3) number of goals scored; 4) number of wins
(C) Champions; (R) Relegated

=== Fixtures and results ===
Home \ Away	KFC	PSA	PVO	SCC	SKA	SASC	TBFC	YSFC
Katong FC		0–2	1–1	0–0	2–4	3–2	2–2	2–3
Police SA	2–2		0–1	1–2	3–1	2–1	2–2	4–2
Project Vaults Oxley SC	1–1	0–2		1–1	1–3	4–1	3–1	1–1
Singapore Cricket Club	6–0	1–1	2–0		1–2	2–0	3–1	1–2
Singapore Khalsa Association	4–0	2–2	5–1	2–3		5–2	1–1	1–0
South Avenue SC	1–2	2–1	1–2	0–2	3–6		2–3	1–5
Tiong Bahru FC	1–5	0–0	5–2	1–4	2–2	2–1		0–1
Yishun Sentek Mariners	3–1	0–0	4–3	2–2	2–4	2–0	5–0	

Updated to match(es) played on 10 Nov 2024. Source: Football Association of Singapore
Legend: Blue = home team win; Yellow = draw; Red = away team win.

=== Top scorers ===
As of 17 Nov 2024

Rank	Player	Club	Goals
1	Zulkiffli Hassim	Yishun Sentek Mariners	9
2	Chang Guo Guang	Singapore Cricket Club	8
2	Fareez Farhan	Singapore Khalsa Association	8
2	Hazim Faiz	Singapore Cricket Club	8
3	Sergio Moreno	Tiong Bahru	7
4	Fariz Faizal	Singapore Khalsa Association	6

Source: Football Association of Singapore

=== Amateur Leagues Awards Night 2024 ===
Award	Nominee	Club	Recipient
Player of the Year	Fareez Farhan	Singapore Khalsa Association	Farouq Farkhan
Player of the Year	Farouq Farkhan	Yishun Sentek Mariners	Farouq Farkhan
Player of the Year	Zulkiffli Hassim	Yishun Sentek Mariners	Farouq Farkhan
Coach of the Year	Steven Tan	Singapore Cricket Club	Steven Tan
Coach of the Year	Sukhvinder Singh	Singapore Khalsa Association	Steven Tan
Coach of the Year	Yahya Madon	Police Sports Association	Steven Tan
Golden Boot	Zulkiffli Hassim (Yishun Sentek Mariners FC)		
Fair Play Award	Singapore Khalsa Association		

Source: fas.org.sg

== League 2 ==
Singapore Football League 2
- Season: 2024
- Champions: Tengah FC
- Promoted: Tengah FC; Jungfrau Punggol
- Relegated: Bedok South Avenue; Eunos Crescent
- Matches: 62
- Goals: 215 (3.47 per match)
- Top goalscorer: Sadik Said (SSFC)
- Longest winning run: 4 matches (Tengah)
- Longest unbeaten run: 6 matches (Starlight Soccerites)
- Longest winless run: 11 matches (Eunos Crescent)
- Longest losing run: 4 matches (Eunos Crescent)

2024 Singapore Football League (SFL) 2 will kick off on 20 July 2024.

Warwick Knights FC and Jungfrau Punggol was relegated from SFL 1 last season.

Bedok South Avenue SC and Tengah FC were promoted from the 2023 Island Wide League (IWL) as Champions and Runner-ups respectively.

The league was split into top and bottom tiers after round 9. The top 5 teams after round 9 will form the top tier, while the bottom 5 teams will form the bottom tier.

Tengah FC emerged as the League 2 Champions after defeating Kaki Bukit SC with a 3-2 scoreline on 3 November 2024. The title victory marks another huge milestone in the club’s journey, achieving back-to-back promotions.

Jungfrau Punggol will be promoted, along with Tengah, to 2025 SFL 1 after finishing the league in 2nd position.

Bedok South Avenue and Eunos Crescent will be relegated to Island Wide League next season.

Sadik Said (Starlight Soccerites) finished the season as the SFL 2 top scorer with 10 goals.

=== League table ===
Pos	Team	Pld	W	D	L	GF	GA	GD	Pts	Qualification or relegation
1	Tengah FC (C)	13	9	2	2	29	15	+14	29	Promoted to 2025 FAS SFL 1
2	Jungfrau Punggol FC (P)	13	9	1	3	27	17	+10	28	Promoted to 2025 FAS SFL 1
3	Admiralty CSN	13	6	2	5	17	17	0	20	
4	Bishan Barx FC	13	5	3	5	18	18	0	18	
5	Kaki Bukit SC	13	4	3	6	21	20	+1	15	
6	Starlight Soccerites FC	13	7	4	2	35	21	+14	25	
7	GFA Sporting Westlake FC	13	4	5	4	21	19	+2	17	
8	Warwick Knights FC	13	3	5	5	20	24	−4	14	
9	Bedok South Avenue SC (R)	13	2	2	9	12	33	−21	8	Relegated to 2025 FAS IWL
10	Eunos Crescent FC (R)	13	1	3	9	15	31	−16	6	Relegated to 2025 FAS IWL

Source: Football Association of Singapore
Rules for classification: 1) points; 2) goal difference; 3) number of goals scored; 4) number of wins
(C) Champions; (P) Promoted; (R) Relegated

=== Fixtures and results ===
Home \ Away	ACSN	BBFC	BSA	ECFC	GSW	JPFC	KBSC	SSFC	TFC	WKFC
Admiralty CSN		3–1	4–1	1–0	1–0	0–1	0–4	-	0–2	-
Bishan Barx	3–1		1–0	3–1	-	0–1	3–1	-	0–3	-
Bedok South Avenue	-	-		1–2	1–1	0–8	0–2	2–2	-	2–3
Eunos Crescent	-	-	0–1		3–5	-	1–4	1–5	1–1	1–1
GFA Sporting Westlake	-	1–1	2–1	0–1		2–2	-	2–2	-	0–2
Jungfrau Punggol	3–2	3–2	-	2–0	-		2–1	0–4	0–3	-
Kaki Bukit	0–2	1–1	-	-	0–0	0–2		-	2–3	2–3
Starlight Soccerites	0–0	0–1	4–1	4–3	2–1	-	2–2		-	2–1
Tengah FC	1–2	2–1	2–1	-	3–1	-	-	5–3		0–0
Warwick Knights	1–1	1–1	3–1	2–2	2–5	0–1	-	-	-	

Source: Football Association of Singapore
Legend: Blue = home team win; Yellow = draw; Red = away team win.

=== Top scorers ===
As of 4 Nov 2024

Rank	Player	Club	Goals
1	Sadik Said	Starlight Soccerites	10
2	Goh Swee Swee	Jungfrau Punggol	9
3	Ghanisheelan	Tengah FC	7
4	Khuhan Chandran	Tengah FC	6
5	Amirul Walid	Jungfrau Punggol	5

Source: Football Association of Singapore

=== Amateur Leagues Awards Night 2024 ===
Award	Nominee	Club	Recipient
Player of the Year	Afiq Noor	Jungfrau Punggol	Afiq Noor
Player of the Year	Goh Swee Swee	Jungfrau Punggol	Afiq Noor
Player of the Year	Shahrul Shah	Kaki Bukit	Afiq Noor
Coach of the Year	Halis Shafik	Jungfrau Punggol	Halis Shafik
Coach of the Year	Sudiat Dali	Admiralty CSN	Halis Shafik
Coach of the Year	Suwito Suma	Bishan Barx	Halis Shafik
Golden Boot	Sadik Said (Starlight Soccerites FC)		
Fair Play Award	GFA Sporting Westlake FC		

Source: fas.org.sg
