= Steven Tan =

Singaporean footballer

Steven Tan Teng Chuan (born 28 December 1970) is a Singaporean former footballer who played for the Singapore national team during the 1990s as a striker.

He was best known for coming off the bench as a substitute and scoring the all-important goals during the Malaysia Cup season, earning himself the nickname of the "Super Steve" or "Super sub". He was part of the squad which won the Malaysia Cup in the 1994 FAM League season.

== Coaching career ==
On 6 January 2011, Tan was appointed as the head coach of Tampines Rovers FC for the 2011 S-League season replacing Vorawan Chitavanich who moved up to become the club technical director. Tampines Rovers won the league in 2011. Tan held this role until August 2012, where he was replaced by Tay Peng Kee after a series of poor results.

Tan is the head coach of Temasek Polytechnic's and Anglo-Chinese School's football team. He is also the technical director of the F-17 Football Academy.

In 2016, Tan became the head coach of the ActiveSG Football Academy’s programme at Kallang Cricket Field.

Under the helms of Tan, newly promoted Singapore Cricket Club finished the 2023 Singapore Football League 1 (SFL 1) season in 4th position and reached the semi-finals of FA Cup. Tan was eventually nominated for SFL1 Coach Of The Year 2023.

Tan's Singapore Cricket Club finished in 2nd place for the 2024 SFL 1 season and won the Coach of the Year award during the Amateur Leagues Awards Night 2024.

== Personal life ==
Tan has three daughters and a son, Marc Ryan Tan, who is also a footballer.
