= Fareez Farhan =

Singaporean footballer

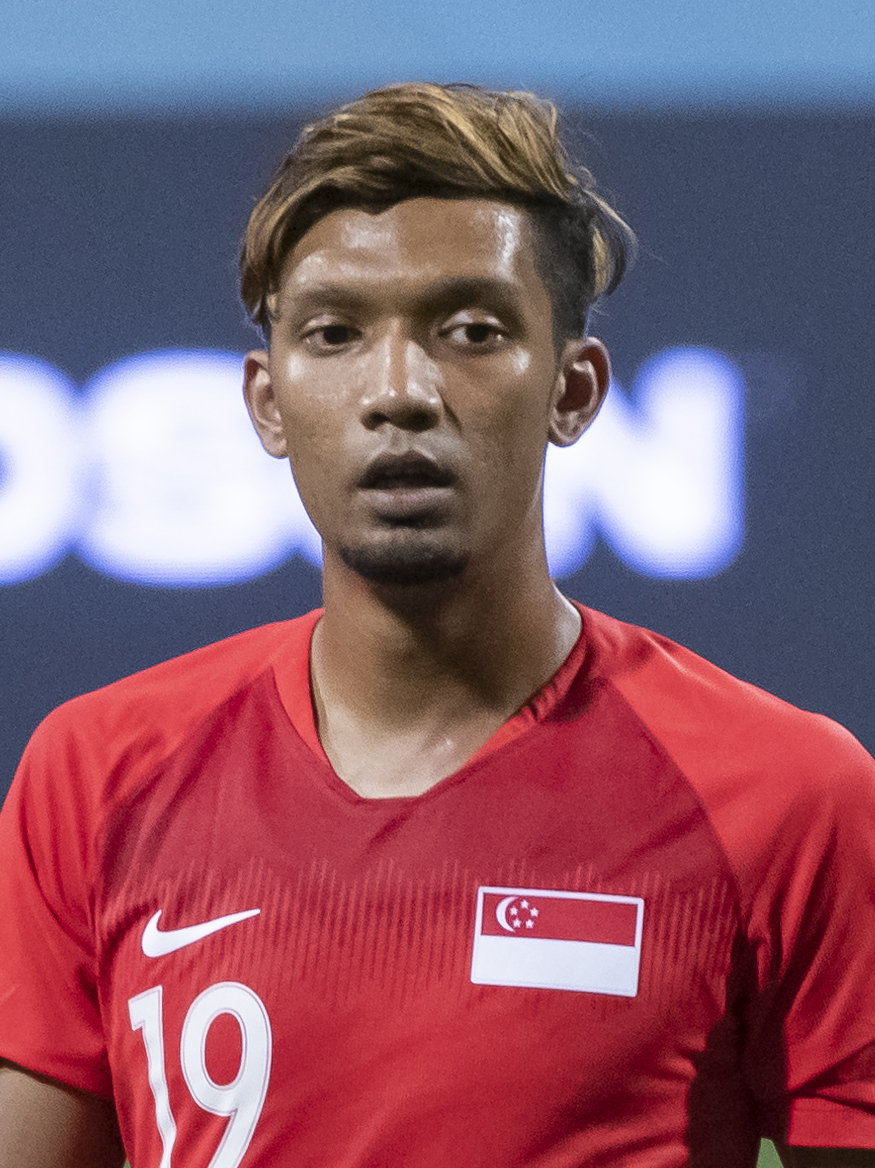
- Fareez playing for Singapore in 2019

Personal information
- Full name: Muhammad Fareez bin Mohd Farhan
- Date of birth: 29 July 1994 (age 32)
- Place of birth: Singapore
- Height: 1.78 m (5 ft 10 in)
- Positions: Winger; attacking midfielder

Team information
- Current team: Kelantan
- Number: 11

Senior career*
Years	Team	Apps	(Gls)
2011–2012	Gombak United	14	(3)
2012–2014	Young Lions	4	(0)
2015	Hougang United	12	(2)
2016	Young Lions	22	(8)
2017-2018	Hougang United	39	(9)
2019–2022	Geylang International	53	(12)
2023–	Kelantan		

International career^{‡}
2012–	Singapore U22	5	(2)
2019–	Singapore	3	(0)
- * Club domestic league appearances and goals as of 22 November 2019 ‡ National team caps and goals as of 22 November 2019

Muhammad Fareez bin Mohd Farhan (born 29 July 1994) is a Singaporean professional footballer who plays either as a winger or attacking-midfielder for Singapore Premier League club Hougang United and the Singapore national team.

== Club career ==
=== Gombak United ===
Fareez began his footballing career with Gombak United in 2011. The teenage forward became the youngest player since Hariss Harun to make his debut in the S.League against Albirex Niigata (S) on 11 April 2011, coming on for South Korean striker Chang Jo-Yoon in the 88th minute. He was then the second youngest player to play in the S.League at 16 years 7 months and 13 days. He scored his first league goal in the 2-1 defeat against Singapore Armed Forces on 25 June 2011.

In February 2011, Fareez's father contacted Serbian coach Luka Lalic who arranged a six-week-long trial for the player at Croatian giants Dinamo Zagreb. Dinamo Zagreb wanted to keep Fareez, but were unable to sign him under new FIFA regulations in the wake of Chelsea's alleged tapping-up of French youngster Gael Kakuta in 2009.

=== Young Lions ===
Following Gombak United's decision to sit out the 2013 S.League, Fareez signed for Courts Young Lions. As he was in the Singapore Police Force for compulsory national services in Singapore, he only appeared four times and failed to score for the club.

=== Hougang United ===
Fareez Farhan signed for Hougang United in December 2014. He scored 2 goals in 12 appearances for the club.

=== Young Lions ===
Fareez resigned for the Young Lions for the 2016 S.League season and made a fine start to the season, scoring 3 goals in 6 appearances. Fareez scored his fourth goal in his seventh appearance, becoming the top scoring local-born footballer.

=== Return to Hougang ===
Fareez signed again for Hougang United in December 2017, after his release from Young Lions.

=== Geylang International ===
For the 2019 AIA Singapore Premier League season, Geylang announced that Fareez had signed for Geylang International. He made his debut in a 1-0 win over Albirex Niigata Singapore. On the 5th of April he scored his first goal in a 5-2 victory over Warriors FC. In total, he scored nine goals from 23 appearances to help the Eagles finish fifth in the 2019 Singapore Premier League.

== International career ==
Singapore national football team's Coach Tatsuma Yoshida called up Fareez Farhan to replace Khairul Amri for the 2022 World Cup qualifiers against Yemen and Palestine in their first two Group D matches. Fareez made his debut against Palestine on 10 September 2019. He won his second cap and his first start in a friendly against Jordan.

== Career statistics ==
=== Club ===
Statistics accurate as of 19 Mar 2022

Club	Season	League		Singapore Cup		League Cup		AFC		Total	
Club	Season	Apps	Goals	Apps	Goals	Apps	Goals	Apps	Goals	Apps	Goals
Gombak United	2011	18	1	1	0	0	0	0	0	19	1
Gombak United	2012	6	0	1	0	0	0	0	0	7	0
Gombak United	Total	13	1	2	0	0	0	0	0	15	1
Young Lions FC	2012	6	0	0	0	0	0	0	0	6	0
Young Lions FC	2013	18	2	1	0	2	0	0	0	21	2
Young Lions FC	2014	0	0	0	0	0	0	0	0	0	0
Young Lions FC	Total	24	2	1	0	2	0	0	0	27	2
Hougang United	2015	21	1	1	0	3	1	0	0	25	2
Young Lions FC	2016	21	8	1	0	0	0	0	0	22	8
Hougang United	2017	11	4	6	1	2	1	0	0	19	6
Hougang United	2018	19	3	1	0	0	0	0	0	20	3
Hougang United	Total	30	7	7	1	2	1	0	0	39	9
Geylang International	2019	23	9	5	2	0	0	0	0	28	11
Geylang International	2020	10	1	0	0	0	0	0	0	10	1
Geylang International	2021	14	0	0	0	0	0	0	0	14	0
Geylang International	2022	3	0	0	0	0	0	0	0	3	0
Geylang International	Total	50	10	5	2	0	0	0	0	55	12
Singapore Khalsa Association	2023	?	?	0	0	0	0	0	0	?	?
Singapore Khalsa Association	2024	?	4	0	0	0	0	0	0	?	4
Singapore Khalsa Association	Total	?	4	0	0	0	0	0	0	?	4
Career total		159	29	17	3	14	2	0	0	190	34

== International statistics ==
=== International caps ===
No	Date	Venue	Opponent	Result	Competition
1	10 September 2019	Jalan Besar Stadium, Kallang, Singapore	Palestine	2-1 (won)	2022 FIFA World Cup qualification – AFC second round
2	6 October 2019	Amman International Stadium, Amman, Jordan	Jordan	0-0 (draw)	Exhibition game
