= 2022 Singapore Football League =

The 2022 Singapore Football League was the 46th season of the Singapore Football League, formerly known as National Football League (NFL), after a 3-year absence. The league featured promotion and relegation between football clubs in League 1, 2 and the Island Wide League.

In 2020, the NFL was renamed as Singapore Football League (SFL). Due to the COVID-19 pandemic in Singapore, the first season of SFL started in 2022.

== League 1 ==
Singapore Football League 1
- Season: 2022
- Champions: Singapore Khalsa Association
- Relegated: Mattar Sailors; GFA Sporting Westlake
- Matches: 56
- Goals: 181 (3.23 per match)
- Top goalscorer: Fariz Faizal (12 goals)

Singapore Khalsa Association clinched the Singapore Football League (SFL) 1 title for the first time and became the 13th winner of the competition.

The team received $15,000 along with the coveted trophy from the FAS President, Lim Kia Tong.

Singapore Khalsa Association forward Fariz Faizal also picked up the SFL 1 Top Goalscorer award having finished the season with 12 goals.

Pos	Team	Pld	W	D	L	GF	GA	GD	Pts	Qualification or relegation
1	Singapore Khalsa Association (C)	14	8	4	2	36	18	+18	28	
2	Yishun Sentek Mariners	14	5	7	2	26	20	+6	22	
3	Warwick Knights	14	5	6	3	23	21	+2	21	
4	Katong FC	14	6	3	5	19	17	+2	21	
5	Tiong Bahru FC	14	5	3	6	27	25	+2	18	
6	Project Vaults Oxley SC	14	4	4	6	20	26	−6	16	
7	GFA Sporting Westlake (R)	14	3	7	4	20	30	−10	16	Relegated to 2023 SFL2
8	Mattar Sailors (R)	14	1	4	9	10	24	−14	7	Relegated to 2023 SFL2

Source: fas.org.sg
Rules for classification: 1) points; 2) goal difference; 3) number of goals scored; 4) number of wins
(C) Champions; (R) Relegated

== League 2 ==
Singapore Football League 2
- Season: 2022
- Champions: Jungfrau Punggol
- Promoted: Jungfrau Punggol; Singapore Cricket Club
- Relegated: Balestier United RC; Commonwealth Cosmos
- Matches: 90
- Goals: 319 (3.54 per match)
- Top goalscorer: Chang Guo Guang (20 goals)

Jungfrau Punggol FC clinched the Singapore Football League (SFL) 2 title for the first time. With the triumph, they became the 14th winner of the competition.

The prize ceremony was held at the Jalan Besar Stadium after the match between Jungfrau Punggol and Balestier United on 31 October 2022, with the champions receiving S$7,500 along with the coveted trophy from FAS Acting President Bernard Tan.

Singapore Cricket Club forward Chang Guo Guang clinched the SFL 2 Top Scorer award having finished the season with 20 goals – 11 more than his closest competitor.

Pos	Team	Pld	W	D	L	GF	GA	GD	Pts	Qualification or relegation
1	Jungfrau Punggol (C, P)	18	14	3	1	48	14	+34	45	Promoted to 2023 SFL1
2	Singapore Cricket Club (P)	18	13	4	1	46	11	+35	43	Promoted to 2023 SFL1
3	Admiralty CSN	18	9	7	2	38	20	+18	34	
4	Police SA	18	9	5	4	40	25	+15	32	
5	Bishan Bars	18	8	3	7	34	35	−1	27	
6	Eunos Crescent	18	7	3	8	31	38	−7	24	
7	Starlight Soccerities	18	4	4	10	27	35	−8	16	
8	South Avenue SC	18	5	1	12	25	43	−18	16	
9	Balestier United RC (R)	18	3	1	14	16	50	−34	10	Relegated to 2023 IWL
10	Commonwealth Cosmos (R)	18	1	3	14	14	48	−34	6	Relegated to 2023 IWL

Source: fas.org.sg
Rules for classification: 1) points; 2) goal difference; 3) number of goals scored; 4) number of wins
(C) Champions; (P) Promoted; (R) Relegated
