= Jurong East Stadium =

Stadium in Singapore

- Pusat Sukan Jurong East (Malay) 裕廊东体育场 (Chinese) ஜூரோங் கிழக்கு அரங்கம் (Tamil)
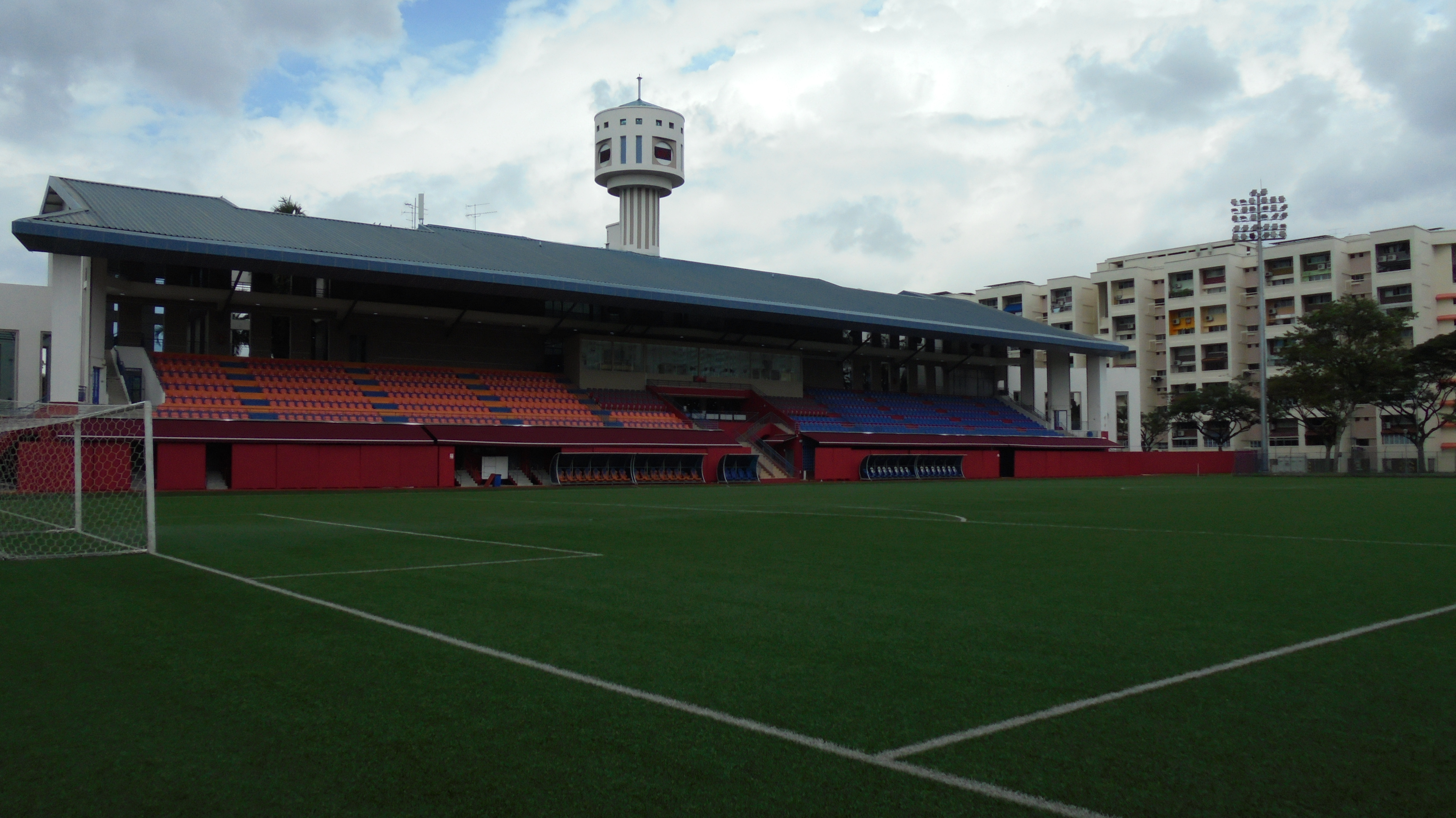
- Interactive map of Jurong East Stadium
- Full name: Jurong East ActiveSG Stadium
- Address: 21 Jurong East Street 31, Singapore 609517
- Location: Jurong East, Singapore
- Coordinates: 1.34815481136°N 103.725420961°E
- Owner: Sport Singapore
- Operator: Sport Singapore
- Capacity: 2,700
- Surface: Artificial turf
- Scoreboard: Yes
- Record attendance: 2,497 (Albirex Niigata (S) vs Lion City Sailors, 16 July 2023)
- Public transit: EW25 Chinese Garden

Construction
- Opened: 18 April 1998; 28 years ago

Tenants
- FC Jurong (2004–present); FC Jurong Women (2022–present); Tanjong Pagar United (2020–present)

Jurong East Stadium is a football stadium located in Jurong East, Singapore. It serves as the home ground of Singapore Premier League side, FC Jurong, FC Jurong Women, and Tanjong Pagar United. The stadium also hosts football matches for other leagues organised by the Football Association of Singapore (FAS), including the Singapore Football League and the Island Wide League.

The stadium is managed by Sport Singapore, and is generally open to the public daily from 7:00am till 7:30pm, unless exclusively booked.

It has also occasionally served as a venue for general election rallies and post election assemblies, including those organised by the ruling People's Action Party (PAP), and various opposition parties including SingFirst, and the Singapore Democratic Party (SDP).

== History ==
Jurong East Stadium is part of the Jurong East Sport Centre, formerly known as Jurong East Sport and Recreation Centre, a community sports facility that also comprises the Jurong East Swimming Complex and Jurong East Sports Hall. The facilities were originally planned to be tendered in 1988 and completed by the end of 1990 on a site adjacent to Chinese Garden, near the junction of Boon Lay Way and Jurong Town Hall Road.

Following a review by the Ministry of National Development, the proposed site was relocated, with the original site reserved for more comprehensive development. In 1993, plans called for the sports centre's facilities to be split between two sites. A 3 hectare site along Jurong Street 31 was designated for the swimming complex and the indoor sports hall, while another 3 hectare site at Penjuru Road was intended for the outdoor stadium.

The plans were subsequently revised to co-locate the facilities within a single sports centre. The centre was opened in phases, with Jurong East Stadium completed and opened to the public on 18 April 1998, followed by the swimming complex and the sports hall in 2000.

Since 2025, the Jurong East Sport Centre, including the stadium, has been undergoing upgrading works as part of Sport Singapore’s islandwide efforts to rejuvenate its sports facilities. The works have been carried out progressively while the centre remains operational to minimise disruption to residents and users.

== Facilities & structures ==
The stadium has a seating capacity of 2,700, comprising 1,500 permanent, and 1,200 semi-permanent seats. Its facilities include a football field, and a jogging track. Unlike most other stadiums in Singapore, it does not have a conventional running track or dedicated athletic facilities.

== International fixtures ==
To date, only two international matches have been played at the stadium due to its limited seating capacity. Most international matches in Singapore are instead held at Jalan Besar Stadium or the National Stadium.

Date	Competition	Team	Score	Team	Attendance
26 November 2008	Friendly	Singapore	2–2	Vietnam	2,690
6 June 2015	Friendly	Singapore	5–1	Brunei	1,140

== See also ==
- List of stadiums in Singapore
