= Sport Singapore =

Government agency for sports culture development

- SportSG

Agency overview
- Formed: 1 October 1973; 53 years ago (as Singapore Sports Council); 1 April 2014; 12 years ago (as Sport Singapore)
- Jurisdiction: Government of Singapore
- Headquarters: 230 Stadium Boulevard, Singapore 397799
- Agency executives: Kon Yin Tong, Chairman; Alan Goh, CEO; Prof Tan Cheng Han, Deputy Chairman; Chiang Hock Woon, Deputy CEO; Goh Fang Min, CFO & Chief Assurance and Corporate Excellence Group; Sng Hock Lin, Chief (ActiveSG); Lim Hong Khiang, Chief (Sport Infrastructure Group); Muhammad Rostam Bin Umar, Chief (Strategy Group); Toh Boon Yi, Chief (Singapore Sport Institute)
- Parent agency: Ministry of Culture, Community and Youth
- Website: sportsingapore.gov.sg

Sport Singapore (SportSG) is a statutory board under the Ministry of Culture, Community and Youth of the Government of Singapore. It is the lead agency tasked with developing a holistic sports culture for the nation.

== History ==
The SportSG was founded on 1 October 1973 as the Singapore Sports Council (SSC), through the merger of the National Sports Promotion Board (NSPB) and the National Stadium Corporation (NSC). On 1 April 2014, the SSC was renamed Sports Singapore in a re-branding exercise.

On 7 October 2022, SportSG incorporated a company named Kallang Alive Sport Management Co Pte Ltd (KASM), the subsidiary of the Kallang Alive Holding Co Pte Ltd, to handle the operation of Singapore Sports Hub from 9 December of the year, which was previously managed by Sports Hub Pte Ltd (SHPL). On 28 November 2025, the Singapore Sports Hub was renamed The Kallang to honour the area's "local heritage" as announced by its existing operator (formerly KASM) which was re-branded as The Kallang Group.

== Safe Sport Commission ==
In 2019, the Safe Sport Commission Singapore (SSCS) was set up by SportSG in partnership with the Ministry of Social and Family Development, the Singapore Police Force, and the Singapore Ministry of Education in 2019 to clamp down on the abuse and harassment of athletes in sport.

== See also ==
- Singapore Sports Hub
