= Clementi Stadium =

Stadium in Singapore

- Pusat Sukan Clementi (Malay) 金文泰体育场 (Chinese) கிளிமெண்டி விளையாட்டரங்கம் (Tamil)
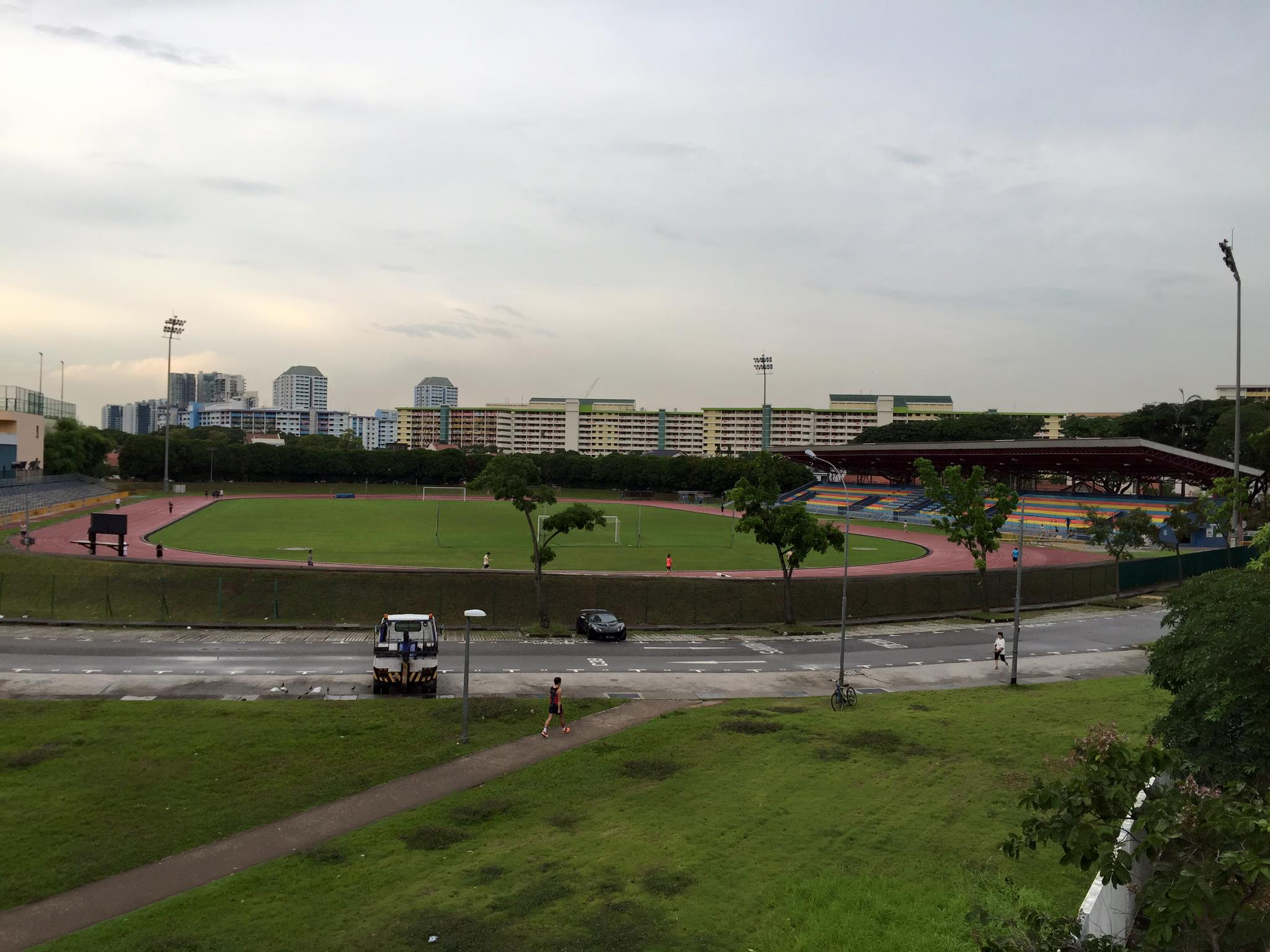
- Clementi Stadium
- Interactive map of Clementi Stadium
- Full name: Clementi ActiveSG Stadium
- Address: 10 West Coast Walk, Singapore 127156
- Location: Clementi, Singapore
- Coordinates: 1.309845°N 103.763015°E
- Owner: Sport Singapore
- Operator: Sport Singapore
- Capacity: 4,000
- Surface: Grass
- Public transit: EW23 Clementi; CR18 West Coast

Construction
- Opened: 1 April 1983; 43 years ago
- Renovated: 2026

Tenants
- Clementi Khalsa (1999–2002); Tanjong Pagar United (2011); Tampines Rovers (2012–2014)

Clementi Stadium is a multi-purpose stadium located in Clementi, Singapore. It formerly served as the home ground of several Singapore Premier League football clubs, including Clementi Khalsa, Tanjong Pagar United, and Tampines Rovers. The stadium had also hosted football matches for various league competitions organised by the Football Association of Singapore (FAS) including the Singapore Football League and the Island Wide League.

The stadium is managed by Sport Singapore. Like most stadiums in Singapore, it was generally open to the public daily from 4:30am till 9:30pm, unless exclusively booked, before it was temporarily closed for renovation works since 2026.

It has also occasionally hosted political rallies during Singapore's general elections, including those organised by the ruling People's Action Party (PAP), and opposition parties such as the Reform Party.

== History ==
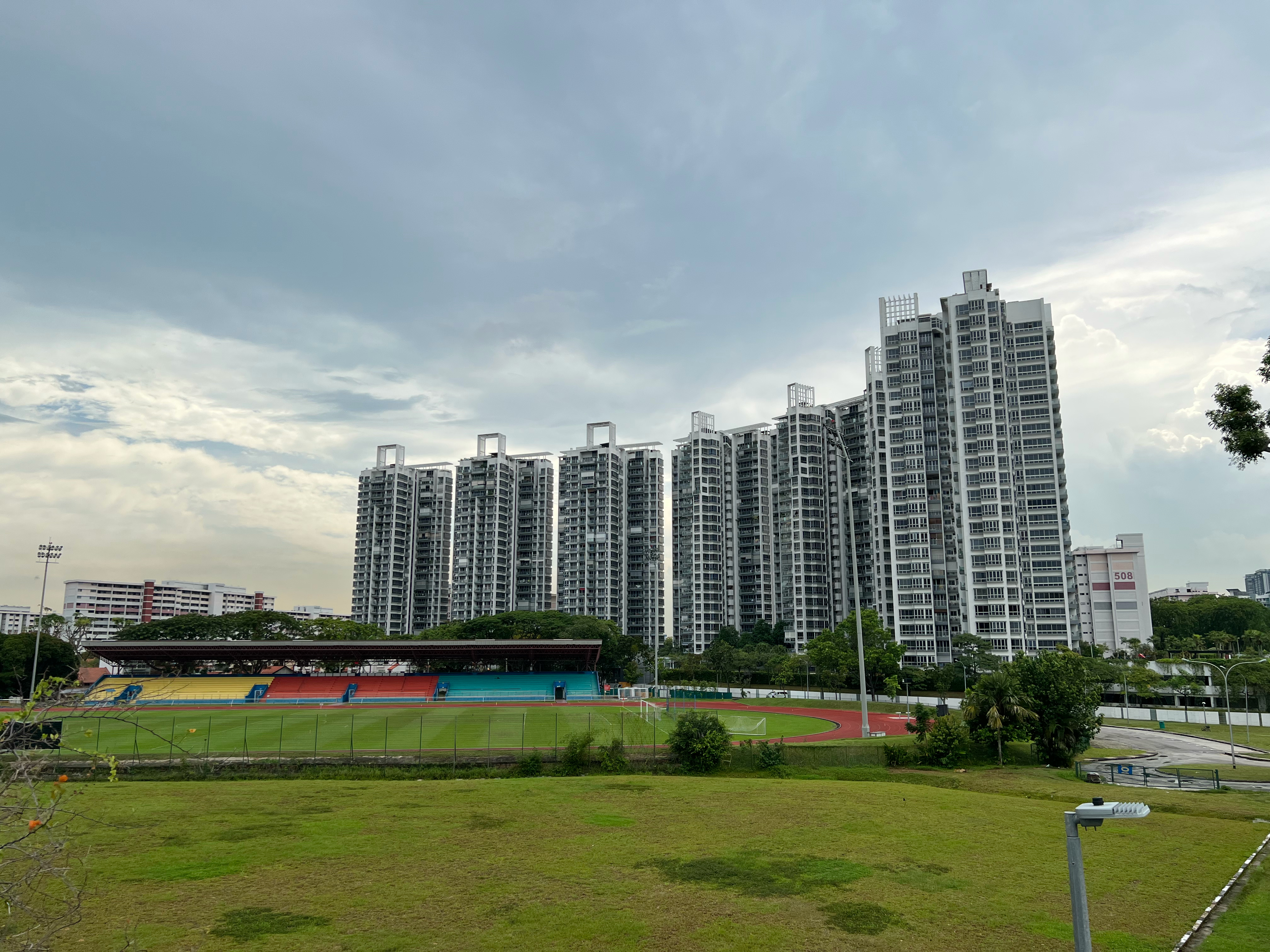
Clementi Stadium with The Parc condominium in the background in 2022

Clementi Stadium forms part of the Clementi Sport Centre, a community sports facility that also comprises Clementi Sports Hall and Clementi Swimming Complex. The facilities are separated from one another by the Ayer Rajah Expressway. Construction of the sports centre was carried out in phases. The stadium was taken over by the Singapore Sports Council upon completion on 21 February 1983, and opened to the public on 1 April of that year, while the swimming complex subsequently opened on 15 August 1983.

The stadium later served as the home ground of several football clubs competing in the Singapore Premier League. From 1999 to 2002, it was the home ground of Clementi Khalsa FC, before the club merged with Balestier Central FC to form Balestier Khalsa FC. During the 2011 S.League season, Tanjong Pagar United FC temporarily relocated to Clementi Stadium, after its former home ground, Queenstown Stadium, was occupied by French club, Étoile FC. The following year, after the closure of Tampines Stadium for the development of Our Tampines Hub, Tampines Rovers FC began using Clementi Stadium as its temporary home ground. The club remained there until 2014, when it relocated to Jurong West Stadium.

On 7 July 2026, the stadium was closed to undergo a four year redevelopment. The new stadium is expected to include a new jogging track, a softball field, a multi-purpose field capable of accommodating baseball or football, and sheltered courts. The expanded facilities are intended to support the training needs of Singapore's national softball and baseball teams. The redevelopment is expected to be completed by 2030.

== Facilities & structures ==
The stadium had a seating capacity of 4,000, comprising 2,000 permanent, and 2,000 semi-permanent seats. Its facilities, before the 2026 closure, include a football field, an eight lane running track, several athletic facilities, and a fitness corner.

== See also ==
- List of stadiums in Singapore
