= 2023 Singapore Football League =

The 2023 Singapore Football League is the 47th season of the Singapore Football League. The league will feature promotion and relegation between football clubs in League 1, 2 and the Island Wide League.

== SFL Challenge Cup ==
29 April 2023	Singapore Khalsa Association	2-1	Yishun Sentek Mariners	Singapore
17:00 UTC+8	- (o.g.); Al Harith	Report	Goal	Stadium: Yishun Stadium

== League 1 ==
Singapore Football League 1
- Season: 2023
- Champions: Singapore Khalsa Association
- Relegated: Warwick Knights FC; Jungfrau Punggol FC
- Top goalscorer: Chang Guo Guang (12 goals)

Singapore Khalsa Association retained the Singapore Football League (SFL) 1 title that they won for the first time in 2022. They also became the first back-to-back winners in the competition. The SFL 1 champion receives $15,000, along with the coveted trophy.

Singapore Cricket Club forward Chang Guo Guang picked up the SFL 1 Top Goal scorer award, finishing the season with 12 goals. He was also the SFL 2 Top Goal scorer with 20 goals in 2022.

Warwick Knights FC and Jungfrau Punggol will be relegated to SFL 2 next season.

Pos	Team	Pld	W	D	L	GF	GA	GD	Pts	Qualification or relegation
1	Singapore Khalsa Association (C)	14	11	3	0	39	15	+24	36	
2	Tiong Bahru FC	14	8	1	5	32	25	+7	25	
3	Yishun Sentek Mariners (Note: Match 46 awarded 3-0 in favour of Yishun Sentek Mariners FC)	14	7	3	4	33	18	+15	24	
4	Singapore Cricket Club	14	7	2	5	26	19	+7	23	
5	Katong FC	14	4	4	6	19	23	−4	16	
6	Project Vaults Oxley SC	14	5	1	8	25	41	−16	16	
7	Warwick Knights FC (R)	14	3	4	7	25	36	−11	13	Relegated to 2024 FAS SFL 2
8	Jungfrau Punggol FC (R)	14	1	2	11	21	43	−22	5	Relegated to 2024 FAS SFL 2

Source: fas.org.sg
Rules for classification: 1) points; 2) goal difference; 3) number of goals scored; 4) number of wins
(C) Champions; (R) Relegated

=== Top scorers ===
Rank	Player	Club	Goals
1	Chang Guo Guang	Singapore Cricket Club	12
2	Casteels Tzu-Ming	Tiong Bahru FC	8
3	Goh Swee Swee	Warwick Knights FC	7

=== FAS Awards Night 2023 ===
Award	Nominee	Club	Recipient
Player of the Year	Chang Guo Guang	Singapore Cricket Club	Chang Guo Guang
Player of the Year	Fareez Farhan	Singapore Khalsa Association	Chang Guo Guang
Player of the Year	Luis Lim	Singapore Khalsa Association	Chang Guo Guang
Coach of the Year	Sivaraj Geevananthan	Katong FC	Sukhvinder Singh
Coach of the Year	Steven Tan	Singapore Cricket Club	Sukhvinder Singh
Coach of the Year	Sukhvinder Singh	Singapore Khalsa Association	Sukhvinder Singh
Golden Boot		Singapore Cricket Club	Chang Guo Guang
Fair Play Award			Katong FC

Source: fas.org.sg

== League 2 ==
Singapore Football League 2
- Season: 2023
- Champions: Police SA
- Promoted: Police SA; South Avenue SC
- Relegated: Singapore Xin Hua FC; Mattar Sailors FC
- Top goalscorer: Sharul Shah (18 goals)

Police SA won the Singapore Football League (SFL) 2 title for the first time, becoming the 15th winner of the competition. Along with the trophy, the champion received S$7,500 for winning the title.

Sharul Shah (Kaki Bukit SC) claimed the SFL 2 Top Scorer award with 18 goals.

Police SA and South Avenue SC will be promoted to the SFL 1 in 2024.

Singapore Xin Hua FC and Mattar Sailors FC will be relegated to the Island Wide League (IWL) in 2024.

Pos	Team	Pld	W	D	L	GF	GA	GD	Pts	Qualification or relegation
1	Police SA (C, P)	18	13	4	1	48	18	+30	43	Promoted to 2024 FAS SFL 1
2	South Avenue SC (P)	18	12	3	3	49	22	+27	39	Promoted to 2024 FAS SFL 1
3	Kaki Bukit SC	18	9	3	6	38	32	+6	30	
4	GFA Sporting Westlake FC	18	7	7	4	33	27	+6	28	
5	Starlight Soccerites FC	18	7	1	10	24	29	−5	22	
6	Bishan Barx FC	18	5	6	7	26	25	+1	21	
7	Eunos Crescent FC	18	5	5	8	29	41	−12	20	
8	Admiralty CSN	18	5	4	9	28	36	−8	19	
9	Singapore Xin Hua FC (R)	18	5	4	9	27	43	−16	19	Relegated to 2024 FAS IWL
10	Mattar Sailors FC (R)	18	2	3	13	19	48	−29	9	Relegated to 2024 FAS IWL

Source: fas.org.sg
Rules for classification: 1) points; 2) goal difference; 3) number of goals scored; 4) number of wins
(C) Champions; (P) Promoted; (R) Relegated

=== Top scorers ===
Rank	Player	Club	Goals
1	Sharul Shah	Kaki Bukit SC	18
2	Juma'at Jantan	South Avenue SC	14
3	Ifat Sha'aban	Police SA	11

=== FAS Awards Night 2023 ===
Award	Nominee	Club	Recipient
Player of the Year	Sharul Shah	Kaki Bukit SC	Sharul Shah
Player of the Year	Nabil Iman	Police SA	Sharul Shah
Player of the Year	Juma'at Jantan	South Avenue SC	Sharul Shah
Coach of the Year	Salehin Amin	Bishan Barx FC	Yahya Madon
Coach of the Year	Dalis Supait	Kaki Bukit SC	Yahya Madon
Coach of the Year	Yahya Madon	Police SA	Yahya Madon
Golden Boot		Kaki Bukit SC	Sharul Shah
Fair Play Award			Singapore Xinhua FC

Source: fas.org.sg
