= Singapore FA Cup =

- Founded: 1892
- Country: Singapore
- Number of clubs: 31
- Most championships: Warriors FC (4 titles)
- Website: fas.org.sg/fa-cup
- Current: 2026 Singapore FA Cup

The Singapore Football Association Cup, (also known as the FAS FA Cup), is an annual football competition in Singapore. With the Singapore League Cup discontinued since 2017, the Singapore FA Cup is the second major domestic cup competition in Singapore after the Singapore Cup.

It is one of the oldest football competitions in the world.

== History ==
The Singapore FA Cup was first played in 1892.

From 1968 to 1998, the competition was known as the President's Cup. Police SA met Fathul Karib in the first final in January 1969.

In 2023, the FA Cup made a return after being briefly halted for three years due to the COVID-19 pandemic.

== Eligibility ==
Between 1996 and 1998, the Football Association of Singapore limited the competition to clubs from the S.League (the top level of the Singapore football league system, formed in 1996) only. In 1999, S.League clubs were excluded from the Singapore FA Cup.

Since 1999, the Singapore FA Cup has been a competition primarily for National Football League / Singapore Football League and Island Wide League clubs (second to fourth levels of the Singapore football league system).

From 2006 and 2017, S.League clubs were allowed to field their developmental Prime League teams in the Singapore FA Cup. During that time, Prime League teams won the cup every season other than 2005, 2009, 2010 and 2014.

== Sponsorship ==
Singapore Pools was the Singapore FA Cup sponsor from 1996 until 2017. From 1999 to 2017, the competition was frequently referred to as the Singapore Pools NFL FA Cup or other variations referencing the sponsor and that the clubs participating were from lower levels.

== Winners and finalists ==
=== Results ===
Year	Champions	Score	Runners-up	Venue	Date
1999	Police SA (Note: The amateur club that remained after the professional club, Home United, was to compete in the inaugural S. League in 1996.)	3-0	Mountbatten FC	Tampines Stadium	22 August 1999
2000	Sembawang SC (Note: The amateur club that remained after the professional club, Sembawang Rangers, was formed by the merger of the original club and Gibraltar Crescent to compete in the inaugural S. League in 1996.)	3-2	Andrews Avenue SC	Tampines Stadium	20 August 2000
2001	Andrews Avenue SC	5-0	Tessensohn Khalsa Rovers	Choa Chu Kang Stadium	18 October 2001
2002	Police SA	2-1	Singapore Cricket Club	Clementi Stadium	25 August 2002
2003	Tampines Rovers SC (Note: The amateur club that remained after the professional club was formed in 1996, also as Tampines Rovers to participate in the S. League)	3-1	Police SA	Jalan Besar Stadium	24 August 2003
2004	Tampines Rovers SC	7-0	Katong FC	Jalan Besar Stadium	9 October 2004
2005	SAFSA (Note: The amateur club that remained after the professional club was formed in 1996 as Singapore Armed Forces FC to participate in the S. League, before changing its name to Warriors FC in 2013.)	5-0	Tessensohn Khalsa Rovers	Jalan Besar Stadium	3 September 2005
2006	Singapore Armed Forces Prime League team	2-1	Singapore Cricket Club	Jalan Besar Stadium	11 October 2006
2007	Geylang United Prime League team	1-0	NFA U-18	Jalan Besar Stadium	27 September 2007
2008	Singapore Armed Forces Prime League team	1-0	Katong FC	Jalan Besar Stadium	30 October 2008
2009	Singapore Cricket Club	3-2	Balestier Khalsa Prime League team	Jalan Besar Stadium	20 October 2009
2010	Singapore Recreation Club	3-2	Tampines Rovers Prime League team	Jalan Besar Stadium	19 October 2010
2011	Tampines Rovers Prime League team	1-1 (8-7 p)	Singapore Recreation Club	Jalan Besar Stadium	27 October 2012
2012	Balestier Khalsa Prime League team	2-0	Siglap CSC	Jalan Besar Stadium	30 October 2012
2013	Home United Prime League team	4-1	GFA Sporting Westlake	Jalan Besar Stadium	8 November 2013
2014	Singapore Recreation Club	1-1 (5-3 p)	Balestier Khalsa Prime League team	Jalan Besar Stadium	8 November 2014
2015	Home United Prime League team	5-1	Police SA	Serangoon Stadium	29 November 2015
2016	Home United Prime League team	3-1	Siglap FC	Jalan Besar Stadium	20 November 2016
2017	Warriors FC Prime League team	2-1	Yishun Sentek Mariners	Jalan Besar Stadium	29 October 2017
2018	Yishun Sentek Mariners	3-1	Tiong Bahru FC	Jalan Besar Stadium	18 November 2018
2019	Tiong Bahru FC	2-1	Yishun Sentek Mariners	Jalan Besar Stadium	20 October 2019
Competition not held from 2020 to 2022
2023	Yishun Sentek Mariners	3-2	Singapore Khalsa Association	Jalan Besar Stadium	19 November 2023
Competition not held in 2024
2025	Warwick Knights	2-1	Police SA	Bedok Stadium	9 November 2025
2026					

== See also ==
- Football in Singapore
- Singapore Premier League
- Singapore Football League
- Football Association of Singapore
- List of football clubs in Singapore
- Singapore football league system
