= Singapore Cricket Club =

Singaporean sports club

Coordinates: 1°17′20.11″N 103°51′7.42″E

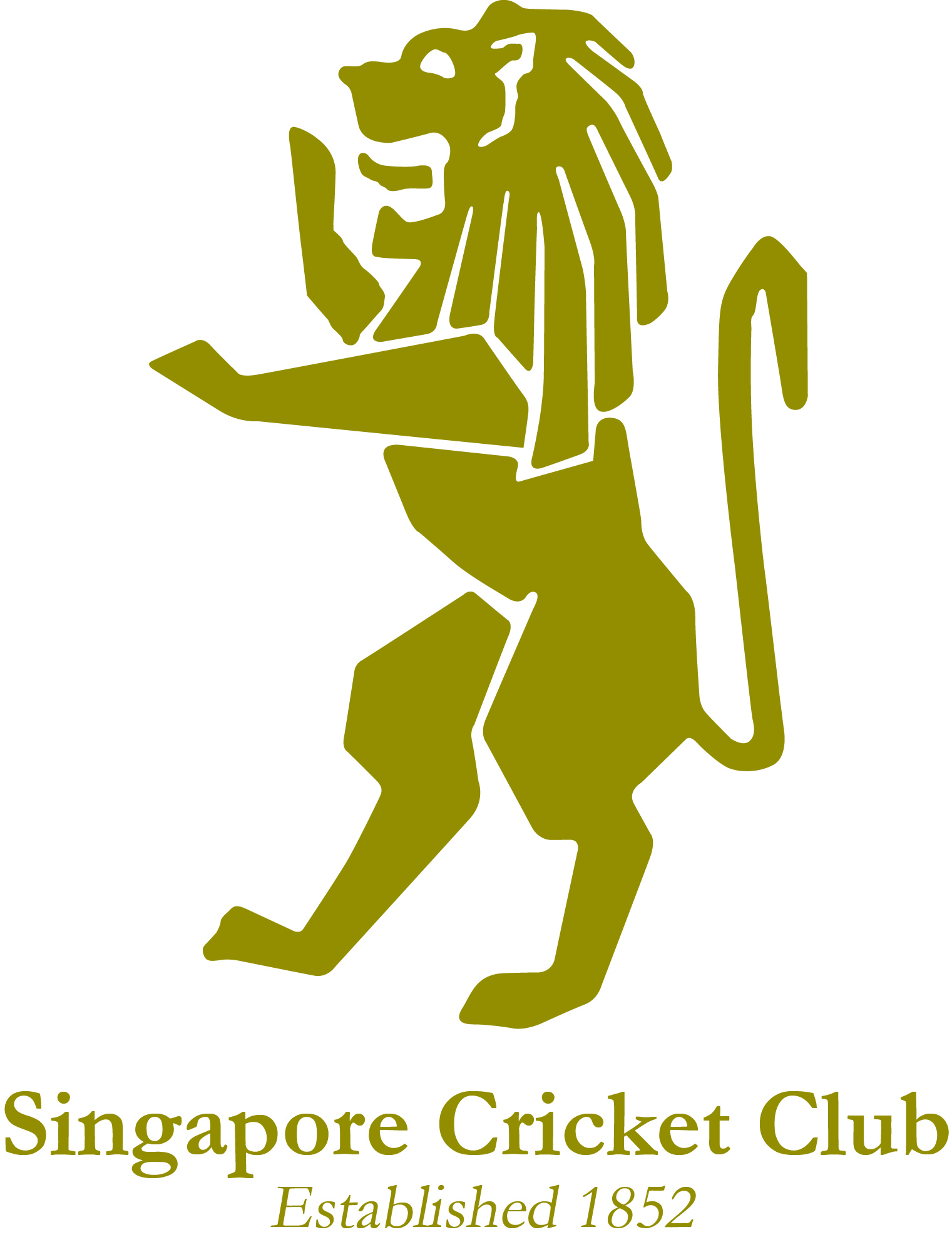
- Singapore Cricket Club's Logo
- Established: 1852; 174 years ago
- Location: A Connaught Dr, Singapore 179681
- President: Martin Goerojo
- General Manager: Brenden Gurusamy
- Website: scc.org.sg

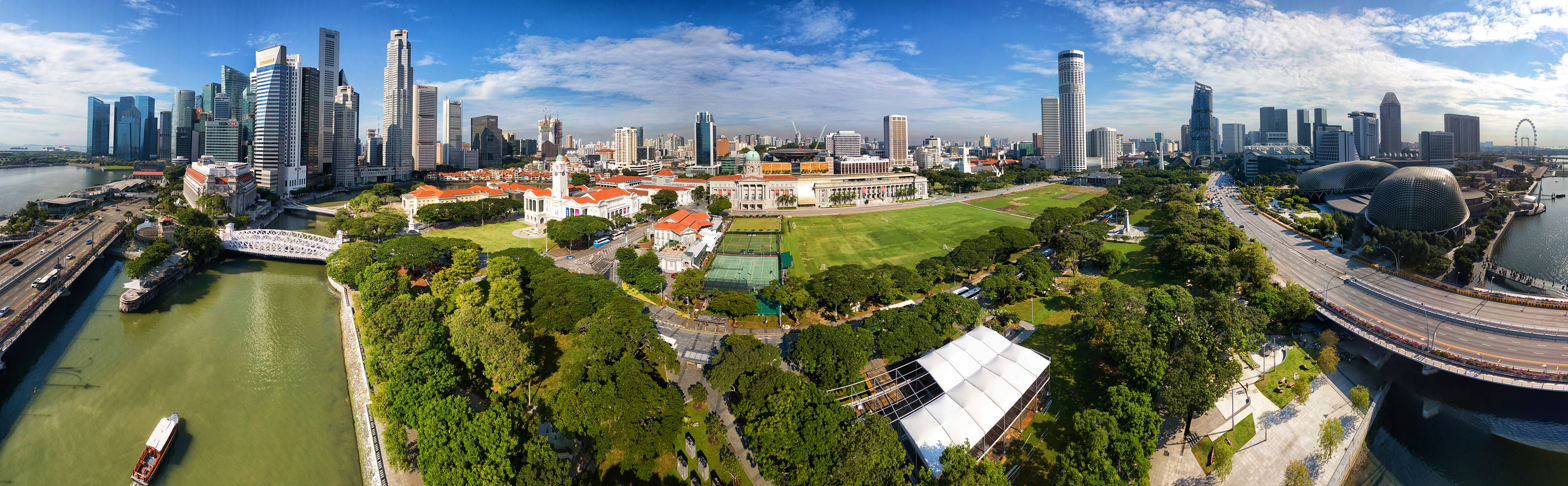
Aerial panorama of Singapore's Downtown Core with the Singapore Cricket Club sitting to the left and right of the Padang

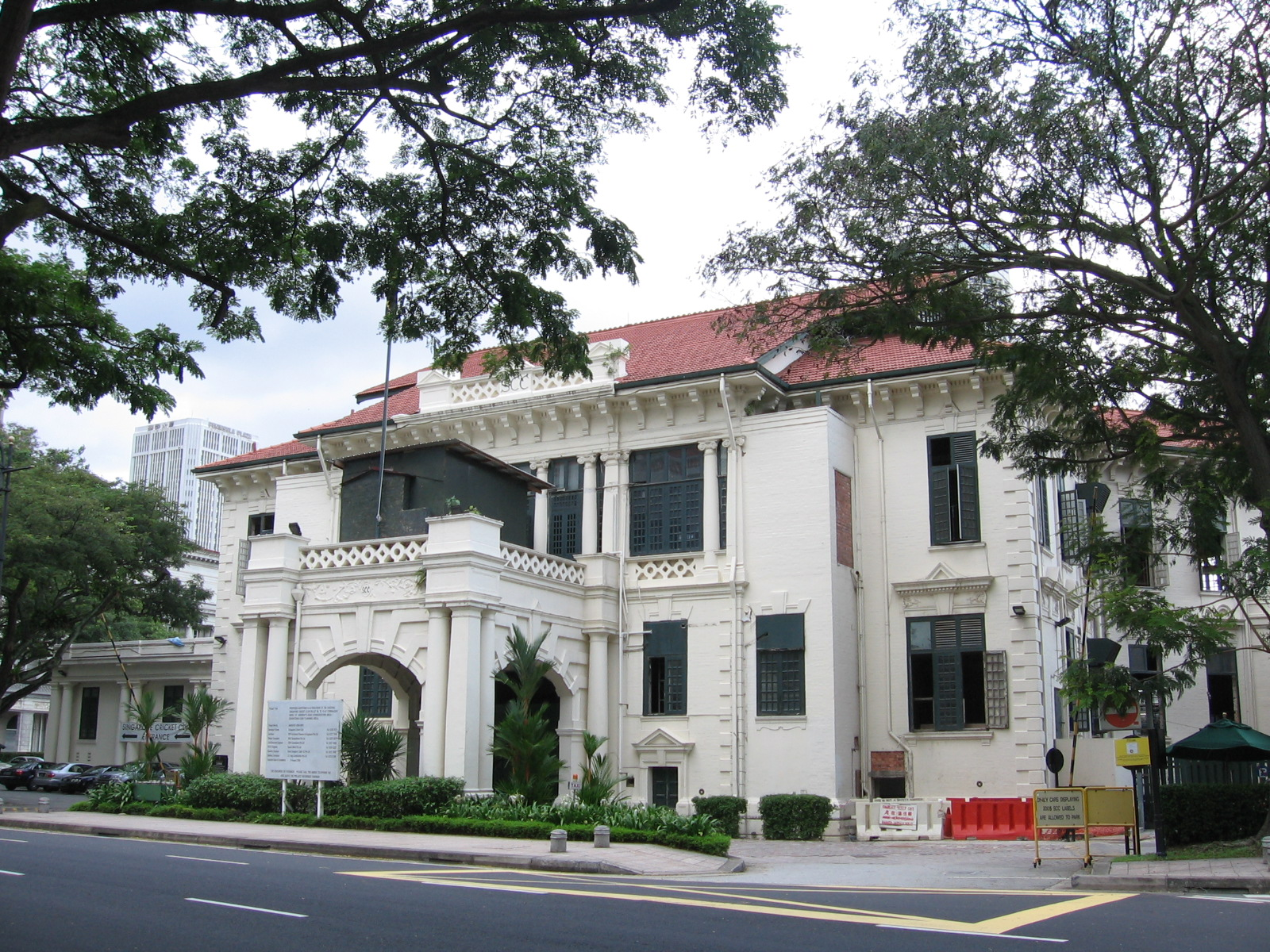
The Singapore Cricket Club's clubhouse on Connaught Drive

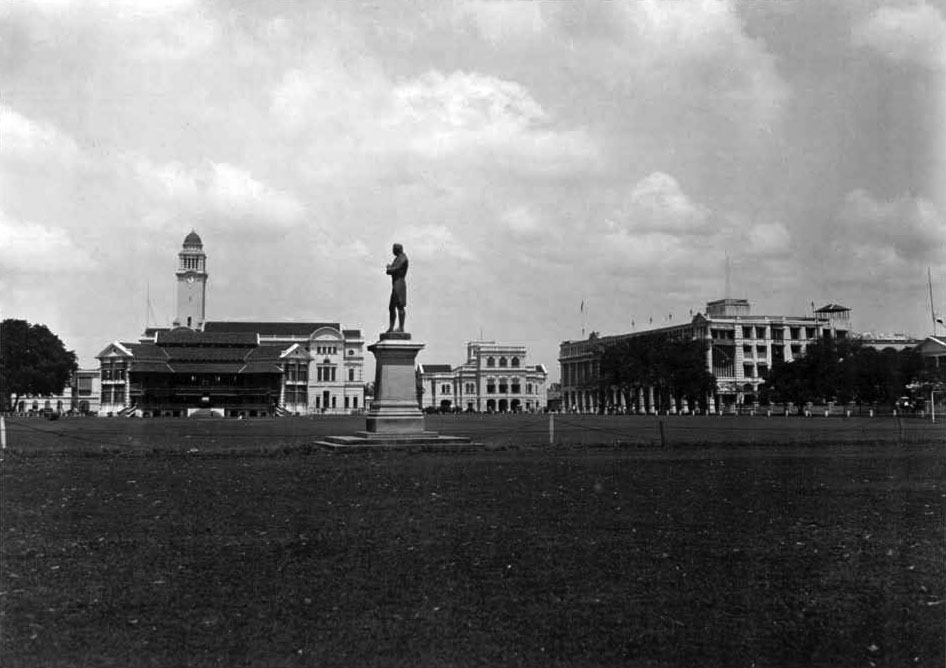
A view of the Club (left of the statue of Sir Stamford Raffles) from A Souvenir of Singapore (1914)

The Singapore Cricket Club (SCC) is one of the premier sports and social clubs in Singapore. Its clubhouse is located on Connaught Drive on the south end of the Padang in Singapore's central business district.

== History ==
The SCC was established in 1852. Over the years, the club has had three clubhouse buildings on the Padang. The first was erected in the 1860s and the second in 1877. The third, which forms the core of the present-day clubhouse, was built in 1884.

As the second oldest club in Singapore, the SCC today has over 3,000 members. Cricket, rugby, football and field hockey are played on the Padang, and the club also has facilities for squash, tennis, lawn bowls, billiards and snooker.

The club has played host to many international cricket events over the years. It also hosts the annual Singapore Cricket Club International Rugby Sevens tournament and an annual Soccer Sevens competition.

They also have a football team participating in the National Football League and the second team participating in Equatorial Football League Premiership.

The club also has a bar called the Men's Bar. In 2024, the club's general committee tabled a resolution to rename it "1852-The Heritage Bar". However, this decision was reversed the following year. Another resolution in 2025 for the bar's name to be "immediately replaced with a new and neutral name to be chosen by members", with "1852" and "Captain's Bar" offered as suggestions, was unsuccessful.

== Football ==
Singapore Cricket Club was relegated to National Football League Division 2 after finishing bottom in the 2017 Season.

The club returned to Division 1 football after finishing as runner-up in 2022 Singapore Football League 2. Forward Chang Guo Guang clinched the SFL 2 Top Scorer award having finished the season with 20 goals – 11 more than his closest competitor.

In the 2024 season, SCC finished as runner-up in the league table. Head coach Steven Tan was nominated 'Coach of the Year' at Amateur Leagues Awards Night 2024. This was his second consecutive nominations for the award.

=== Coaching staff ===
Head Coach	Season	Achievements
Steven Tan	2023–present	– 2023 Coach of the Year (nominee) – 2024 Coach of the Year

== Honours ==
=== League ===
- Singapore Football League 1
  - Champions: 2025
  - Runner-up: 2024
- Singapore Football League 2
  - Runner-up: 2022

=== Cup ===
- SFL Challenge Cup
  - Champions: 2025

== Current season ==
=== Singapore Football League 1 table ===
Pos	Team	Pld	W	D	L	GF	GA	GD	Pts
1	Police SA	4	3	1	0	9	3	+6	10
2	Singapore Cricket Club	4	3	0	1	10	7	+3	9
3	Project Vaults Oxley SC	4	2	1	1	7	3	+4	7
4	Tengah FC	3	1	1	1	4	3	+1	4
5	South Avenue SC	3	1	1	1	8	10	−2	4
6	Bishan Barx FC	4	1	1	2	3	5	−2	4
7	Singapore Khalsa Association	4	0	1	3	4	12	−8	1
8	Jungfrau Punggol FC	2	0	0	2	1	3	−2	0

Updated to match(es) played on 25 October 2026. Source: Football Association of Singapore
Rules for classification: 1) points; 2) goal difference; 3) number of goals scored; 4) number of wins
