= Singapore Khalsa Association FC =

Singaporean football club

Singapore Khalsa Association
- Full name: Singapore Khalsa Association Football Club
- Founded: 1931; 95 years ago
- Head coach: Sukhvinder Singh
- League: Singapore Football League
- 2025: League 1, 4th of 8

Singapore Khalsa Association Football Club, commonly referred to as SKA, is a semi-professional football club based in Tessensohn, Singapore, which plays in the Singapore National Football League. The club was founded in 1931 with its objectives to provide the physical, moral, intellectual, cultural and social improvements of its members and the establishment for the advancement of the moral, intellectual and physical education and well-being of its scholars.

The club became the 2024 Singapore Football League 1 champions, retaining their 2022 and 2023 title. SKA is the first club to win back-to-back title without a single defeat in 2022 and 2023.

Singapore Khalsa Association is also represented in the Island Wide League under Tessensohn Khalsa Rovers.

== History ==
=== Evolution of the Singapore Khalsa Association (SKA) ===
Singapore Khalsa Association (SKA) was the brainchild of a few schoolboys of Raffles Institution during the mid-1920's. In the absence of a Sikh organization for sports and culture, these sports enthusiasts took it upon themselves, with the backing of several adults, to establish Khalsa Association. Gurdwaras functioned, as most still do, as a place of worship and of social functions. Fueled with the need to establish a sports club, for their own community, the SKA was established on 8 May 1931. Today it has become a formidable institution for Sikhs in particular to partake and hone their sporting skills.

In the 1960s, SKA got its cultural aspect when a group of Sikh youths, enthusiastic in organizing cultural activities, affiliated themselves with the Association. Amongst the activities conducted were talks emphasizing Sikh religion, culture and education.

=== Three-peats Singapore Football League 1 Champions ===
On 12 September 2022, Singapore Khalsa Association have clinched the Singapore Football League Division One (SFL 1) title for the first time, having completed the 2022 season with 28 points, 6 clear of closest rivals Yishun Sentek Mariners. With the triumph, SKA became the 13th winner of the competition and prevented Tiong Bahru FC from winning their third straight title. The prize ceremony was held at the Jalan Besar Stadium after SKA's final match against Project Vaults Oxley SC where SKA won 3–1. The team received $15,000 along with the coveted trophy from Football Association of Singapore President, Mr Lim Kia Tong. SKA forward Fariz Faizal also picked up the SFL 1 Top Goalscorer award having finished the season with 12 goals.

SKA won their second consecutive SFL 1 title by completing the 2023 season undefeated with 36 points, eight clear of closest challengers Tiong Bahru FC. With the triumph, SKA are back-to-back winners of the competition for the first time.

On 10 November 2024, SKA fought back from two goals down to earn a 2–2 draw against Tiong Bahru FC to seal their third consecutive SFL 1 title.

== Coaching staff ==
| Head Coach | Season | Achievements |
|---|---|---|
| Sukhvinder Singh | 2023-present | – 2023, 2024 Singapore Football League 1 – 2023 SFL 1 Coach of the Year |

== Honours ==
=== League ===
- Singapore Football League 1
  - Champions: 1998, 2022, 2023, 2024
- Singapore Football League 2
  - Champions: 2018
- SFL Challenge Cup
  - Champions: 2023, 2024

== Current season ==
=== Singapore Football League 1 table ===
| Pos | Team | Pld | W | D | L | GF | GA | GD | Pts |
|---|---|---|---|---|---|---|---|---|---|
| 1 | Singapore Cricket Club | 3 | 3 | 0 | 0 | 9 | 3 | +6 | 9 |
| 2 | Police SA | 3 | 2 | 1 | 0 | 5 | 2 | +3 | 7 |
| 3 | Tengah FC | 2 | 1 | 1 | 0 | 4 | 0 | +4 | 4 |
| 4 | Project Vaults Oxley SC | 3 | 1 | 1 | 1 | 4 | 3 | +1 | 4 |
| 5 | South Avenue SC | 3 | 1 | 1 | 1 | 8 | 10 | −2 | 4 |
| 6 | Bishan Barx FC | 3 | 1 | 0 | 2 | 3 | 5 | −2 | 3 |
| 7 | Jungfrau Punggol FC | 2 | 0 | 0 | 2 | 1 | 3 | −2 | 0 |
| 8 | Singapore Khalsa Association | 3 | 0 | 0 | 3 | 4 | 12 | −8 | 0 |

Updated to match(es) played on 27 September 2026. Source: Football Association of Singapore
Rules for classification: 1) points; 2) goal difference; 3) number of goals scored; 4) number of wins

== See also ==
- Balestier Khalsa
- History of Indian influence on Southeast Asia
- History of Singaporean Indians
- Indian Singaporeans
- List of Indian organisations in Singapore
- Non-resident Indian and person of Indian origin
- Sikhism in Singapore
