= Pre-election day events of the 2006 Singaporean general election =

These are the events concerning the 2006 Singaporean general election which occurred before the polling day on 6 May 2006.

== Pre–nomination day events ==
=== New candidates ===
This election was expected to have a large number of new candidates as the major political parties had undergone self-renewal in recent years, many of whom belong to the post-1965 generation. PAP had introduced 24 new candidates. Opposition fielded a total of 25 new candidates, in which the two opposition parties that held a seat, the Workers' Party and the Singapore Democratic Alliance introduced 15 and eight new candidates, respectively. Singapore Democratic Party, a group which did not win any seats in the last election, fielded two new candidates. A total of 49 brand-new candidates (including 11 female candidates, seven from PAP, four from WP and one from SDP) participated in the election.

Name	Age	Occupation	Party	Contested Constituency
Abdul Rahman Mohamad	54	Fire Safety Consultant	SDA	Tampines GRC
Abdul Salim Harun	24	Sales Coordinator	WP	Ang Mo Kio GRC
Baey Yam Keng	35	Former Civil Servant and Vice-President (Corporate Marketing & Corporate Social Responsibility) at CapitaLand and General Manager of CapitaLand Hope Foundation	PAP	Tanjong Pagar GRC
Chia Ti Lik	33	Lawyer and Partner	WP	East Coast GRC
Christopher Joseph de Souza	30	Lawyer, Lee & Lee	PAP	Holland–Bukit Timah GRC
Ellen Lee Geck Hoon	47	Lawyer, Ramdas & Wong	PAP	Sembawang GRC
Elvin Ong Beng Soon	26	Estate Officer	SDA	Pasir Ris–Punggol GRC
Fatimah Lateef	40	Mediacal consultant	PAP	Marine Parade GRC
Grace Fu Hai Yien	42	Senior Executive, PSA International	PAP	Jurong GRC
Goh Meng Seng	36	Businessman	WP	Aljunied GRC
James Gomez	41	Policy Analyst in Sweden	WP	Aljunied GRC
Gopal Krishnan	52	Senior Housing Maintenance Inspector	WP	Ang Mo Kio GRC
Glenda Han Su May	30	Entrepreneur	WP	Ang Mo Kio GRC
Hri Kumar Nair	39	Lawyer, Drew & Napier	PAP	Bishan–Toa Payoh GRC
Ishak Haroun	42	Real Estate Agent	SDA	Pasir Ris–Punggol GRC
Lam Pin Min	36	Ophthalmologist, Eagle Eye Centre	PAP	Ang Mo Kio GRC
Lee Bee Wah	45	Civil Engineer and consultant	PAP	Ang Mo Kio GRC
Lineker Lee Hock Huat	25	Logistics Officer	SDA	Pasir Ris–Punggol GRC
Lee Wai Leng	26	Commercial Translation Services Worker	WP	Ang Mo Kio GRC
Lee Yi Shyan	44	Former Chief Executive Officer of International Enterprise Singapore	PAP	East Coast GRC
Lian Chin Way	36	Regional Business Manager of a British multinational corporation	WP	Nee Soon Central SMC
Liang Eng Hwa	42	Managing Director, Global Financial Markets of DBS Bank	PAP	Holland–Bukit Timah GRC
Lim Biow Chuan	43	Lawyer, Derrick Wong & Lim BC LLP	PAP	Marine Parade GRC
Sylvia Lim Swee Lian	40	Law Lecturer and Manager, Temasek Polytechnic	WP	Aljunied GRC
Lim Wee Kiak	37	Consultant ophthalmologist, National Eye Institute	PAP	Sembawang GRC
Lui Tuck Yew	44	Former Chief of Navy and Chief Executive Officer, Maritime and Port Authority	PAP	Tanjong Pagar GRC
Masagos Zulkifli bin Masagos Muhhamad	42	Vice-president, SingTel Global Services	PAP	Tampines GRC
Mohamad Hamim Aliyas	43	Property Executive	SDA	Pasir Ris–Punggol GRC
Muhammad Ali Aman	39	Executive Director	SDA	Jalan Besar GRC
Muhammad Faishal Ibrahim Khan Surattee	38	Assistant Professor, National University of Singapore	PAP	Marine Parade GRC
Narayanasamy Gogelavany	46	Sales Administrator	SDP	Sembawang GRC
Edmund Ng Say Eng	33	CEO, Infinique Technologies	SDA	Tampines GRC
Ong Hock Siong	59	Marketing Adviser	SDA	Tampines GRC
Michael Anthony Palmer	37	Lawyer and Law Firm, Harry Elias Partnership	PAP	Pasir Ris–Punggol GRC
Denise Phua Lay Peng	46	Full-time Volunteer and founder of Autism Resource Centre (Singapore)	PAP	Jalan Besar GRC
Seah Kian Peng	44	Deputy CEO, NTUC Fairprice Co-operative	PAP	Marine Parade GRC
Brandom Siow Wei Min	30	Key Account Manager, SIA Cargo and former president, NUS Students Union	WP	East Coast GRC
Sng Choon Guan	41	Marketing Manager	SDP	Sembawang GRC
Eric Tan Heng Chong	50	General Manager, RBC Dexia Investor Services Trust	WP	East Coast GRC
Melvin Tan Kian Hwee	31	IT Executive	WP	Ang Mo Kio GRC
Sam Tan Chin Siong	47	Executive Director, Chinese Development Assistance Council	PAP	Tanjong Pagar GRC
Jessica Tan Soon Neo	39	General Manager, Microsoft subsidiary in Singapore	PAP	East Coast GRC
Tan Wui Hua	39	Chief Financial Officer, Lend Lease Singapore	WP	Aljunied GRC
Josephine Teo Li Min	38	Director for Human Resources, NTUC	PAP	Bishan–Toa Payoh GRC
Teo Ser Luck	37	General Manager, DHL Express Singapore	PAP	Pasir Ris–Punggol GRC
Perry Tong Tzee Kwang	34	Management Consultant, United States Hackett Group	WP	East Coast GRC
Yaw Shin Leong	30	e-Business Analyst	WP	Ang Mo Kio GRC
Alvin Yeo Khirn Hai	44	Senior Counsel and co-founder of WongPartnership	PAP	Hong Kah GRC
Zaqy Mohamad	31	Regional Director at multinational IT firm	PAP	Hong Kah GRC

==== Politicians who are retiring ====
All politicians who were retiring or stepping down from their seats were from the People's Action Party.

Name	Constituency	Highest Portfolio attained	Date	Remarks
Chay Wai Chuen	Tanjong Pagar GRC (Queenstown)	Member of Parliament	11 April 2006	
John Chen	Hong Kah GRC (Nanyang)	Minister of State	3 April 2006	
Chew Heng Ching	East Coast GRC (Kaki Bukit)	Member of Parliament	10 April 2006	His ward was redrawn to Marine Parade GRC.
Chin Tet Yung	Sembawang GRC (Woodlands)	Member of Parliament	10 April 2006	
Chong Weng Chiew	Tanjong Pagar GRC (Radin Mas)	Member of Parliament	15 April 2006	
Davinder Singh	Bishan–Toa Payoh GRC (Toa Payoh Central)	Member of Parliament	14 April 2006	
Andy Gan Lai Chiang	Marine Parade GRC (Mountbatten)	Member of Parliament	14 April 2006	First contested in 1991.
Ahmad Khalis	Hong Kah GRC (Keat Hong)	Member of Parliament	3 April 2006	
Warren Lee	Sembawang GRC (Canberra)	Member of Parliament	10 April 2006	
Lee Yock Suan	East Coast GRC (Changi-Simei)	Former Cabinet Minister	10 April 2006	
Leong Horn Kee	Bishan–Toa Payoh GRC (Thomson)	Member of Parliament	14 April 2006	
David Lim Tik En	Holland–Bukit Panjang GRC (Cashew)	Acting Cabinet Minister	2003	
Michael Lim	Pasir Ris–Punggol GRC (Punggol South)	Member of Parliament	13 April 2006	
Loh Meng See	Jalan Besar GRC (Kampong Glam)	Member of Parliament	10 April 2006	
Low Seow Chay	Chua Chu Kang SMC	Member of Parliament	13 April 2006	
Mohamad Maidin Packer	Marine Parade GRC (Kampong Ubi)	Parliamentary Secretary	14 April 2006	
Othman Haron Eusofe	Marine Parade GRC (Geylang Serai)	Minister of State and mayor	25 March 2006	
R Ravindran	Marine Parade GRC (Braddell Heights)	Member of Parliament	15 April 2006	
Tan Boon Wan	Ang Mo Kio GRC (Nee Soon South)	Member of Parliament	10 April 2006	
Tan Cheng Bock	Ayer Rajah SMC	Member of Parliament	10 April 2006	Tan's ward was redrawn to West Coast GRC; would later stand in the 2011 Presidential Elections and in the 2020 and 2025 general elections (under the Progress Singapore Party banner).
Tony Tan Keng Yam	Sembawang GRC (Sembawang)	Deputy Prime Minister	26 March 2006	First elected in 1979. Would later become the 7th President of Singapore (2011–2017)
Tan Soo Khoon	East Coast GRC (Kampong-Chai Chee)	Speaker of Parliament	10 April 2006	Portions of his ward was redrawn into Marine Parade GRC.
Wang Kai Yuen	Bukit Timah SMC	Member of Parliament	1 March 2006	His ward was absorbed into the new Holland–Bukit Timah GRC (while carving out Bukit Panjang).
Yatiman Yusof	Tampines GRC (Tampines West)	Senior Parliamentary Secretary	25 March 2006	

=== Prelude ===
Talks on an impending election have surfaced in earnest since mid-2005, two years before the electoral term is constitutionally expected to end in June 2007. On 9 April, Goh Chok Tong had said that the election was likely to be held in the following four to six weeks.

=== Budget day and progress package ===
On 17 February 2006, Lee Hsien Loong, Prime Minister of Singapore and Secretary General of the PAP delivered the country's Budget Statement to the Parliament. He released details of a S$2.6 billion on a "progress package" including S$500 million for Central Provident Fund top-ups, S$400 million for workfare bonuses, and S$200 million bonuses for national servicemen. Largely due to this package, the 2006 Budget incurred a deficit of S$2.86 billion.

Several PAP members attempted to play down the significance of the event. Sin Boon Ann and Halimah Yacob said it was no different from the PAP government's past practices of sharing surpluses when the economy does well. More neutral watchers, such as Gillian Koh from the Institute of Policy Studies, however, say it reflects the government's intentions to fulfil general sentiments in the electorate who feel it is the "right thing" to be done.

Low Thia Khiang (WP) came out strongly against the progress package which he said was no more than a vote-winning tool by the PAP. Low questioned why the government had earlier retorted his call for more spending on education citing that it would result in a budget deficit. Low called for greater transparency on how the government intend to financing the package and to compensate for the budget shortfall. Wong Kan Seng (PAP) later dismissed claims that the progress package constitutes a form of vote buying. Nonetheless, even PAP MPs such as Wang Kai Yuen (Retired MP) had said that the payout would "render the ground sweeter for the ruling party in the coming General Election". Tan Cheng Bock (Retired MP) expressed surprise that the government had more than S$13 billion in capital receipts and asked why these were "not [itemised] in the Budget".

=== Workers' Party manifesto ===
Workers' Party (WP) was the first party to launch an update to its manifesto on 14 January 2006. Among its policy proposals, it called for the Presidency to revert to its former ceremonial role and the abolishment of the GRCs, the Ethnic Integration Policy for Housing and Development Board flats, the Resident Committees and the Citizen Consultative Committees. It also revealed its intentions to establish a central agency in the provision of public transport, setting up of a national unemployment insurance scheme and a more comprehensive national health insurance scheme among a host of other things.

On 21 January, PAP launched a coordinated attack on the WP's proposals, with Ng Eng Hen highlighting four of their proposals as "four time bombs...[which] will weaken and tear Singapore apart". Khaw Boon Wan, revealed various changes in medical policies, including the Medisave scheme, which has been a constant target for criticism by opposition parties. He also chided the WP for its "failure to understand what makes inter-racialism work in Singapore and why we are different from the rest of the world", referring the four points brought up by Ng Eng Hen as "poisons" Workers' Party chairman Sylvia Lim released a press statement on 22 January, responding to each of the four "time bombs" criticised by Ng and adding that the party was standing firmly by its manifesto.

=== Cartoon T-shirts ===
During the weekend on 4–5 March, members of the Singapore People's Party were at the Pasir Ris–Punggol GRC conducting a walk-about and selling $10 white T-shirts featuring a caricature of a red ant with boxing gloves. Teo Chee Hean, incumbent MP and anchor minister of the GRC, made fun of it saying "I don't think our residents want their flats to be overrun by red ants". His fellow MP Charles Chong added: "It would be very unfair if they come with ants and you use elephants to step on them."

Desmond Lim, assistant secretary-general of the SPP responded that the red ant represented the party's never-say-die spirit: "Ants see no obstacles. If you put a stone in front of them, they will make a detour or climb over it. We are like small ants in the political scene here. But when ants come together, they can move mountains."

Pasir Ris–Punggol GRC housed the Buangkok MRT station where the white elephant incident took place in August 2005 when "white elephant" signs were placed in protest of the station's non-operational status. The incident prompted the government to eventually open the station in January 2006.

=== By-election strategy ===
The last three general elections in 1991, 1997, and 2001 have seen the PAP return to power on Nomination Day as the opposition parties adopted a by-election strategy and contested less than half the number of seats in these elections. For the coming election, early indications by the opposition parties suggest that more than half the seats will be contested. In a Today report dated 6 March 2006, Low Thia Khiang (WP) said that WP does not believe in a by-election strategy and "felt that every Singaporean should have the opportunity to vote".

Chiam See Tong (SPP) said that they would campaign on a by-election strategy given a chance, but he noted that the strategy has been used before and that "it may not capture the imagination of the voters as much." For twenty years since 1992, there is no by-election but there are requests to do so when MPs vacated their seats (cases such as the late former president Ong Teng Cheong resigning his seat to stand as a presidential candidate in the 1993 presidential elections and the legal case of Choo Wee Khiang in 1999); but the reason is that it does not disrupts the mandate of the Parliament, though the government would eventually increase the number of SMCs in subsequent elections. Eventually, the next by-election would not occur until the Hougang's by-election in May 2012, six years later.

=== Chee Soon Juan's bankruptcy ===
On 10 February, Chee Soon Juan (SDP) had been declared a bankrupt by the High Court, after failing to pay S$500,000 in damages awarded to Goh and Lee. Per the bankruptcy order, Chee was barred from standing for elections until February 2011. Chee is already ineligible for this election because of a fine in 2002.

=== Jeyaretnam's potential comeback ===
Opposition veteran J. B. Jeyaretnam, the former secretary-general of WP, had planned to make a comeback by paying off his bankruptcy to contest the election. He told Lianhe Zaobao that he had identified some potential candidates with whom he might form a team to contest a GRC. Steve Chia welcomed this development and expressed his hope that Jeyaretnam will challenge either Lee Kuan Yew or Goh Chok Tong to keep the "big guns" busy in their own constituencies and have less time to campaign for weaker PAP candidates in other electoral divisions. However, he was not found to be contesting in any constituencies on Nomination Day, and thus he was not involved in this election as a candidate; it was speculated that legal troubles surrounding Jeyaretnam, as the earliest he would have been discharged was in mid-June, may have chose not to stand for the election.

=== Goh Chok Tong's special assignment ===
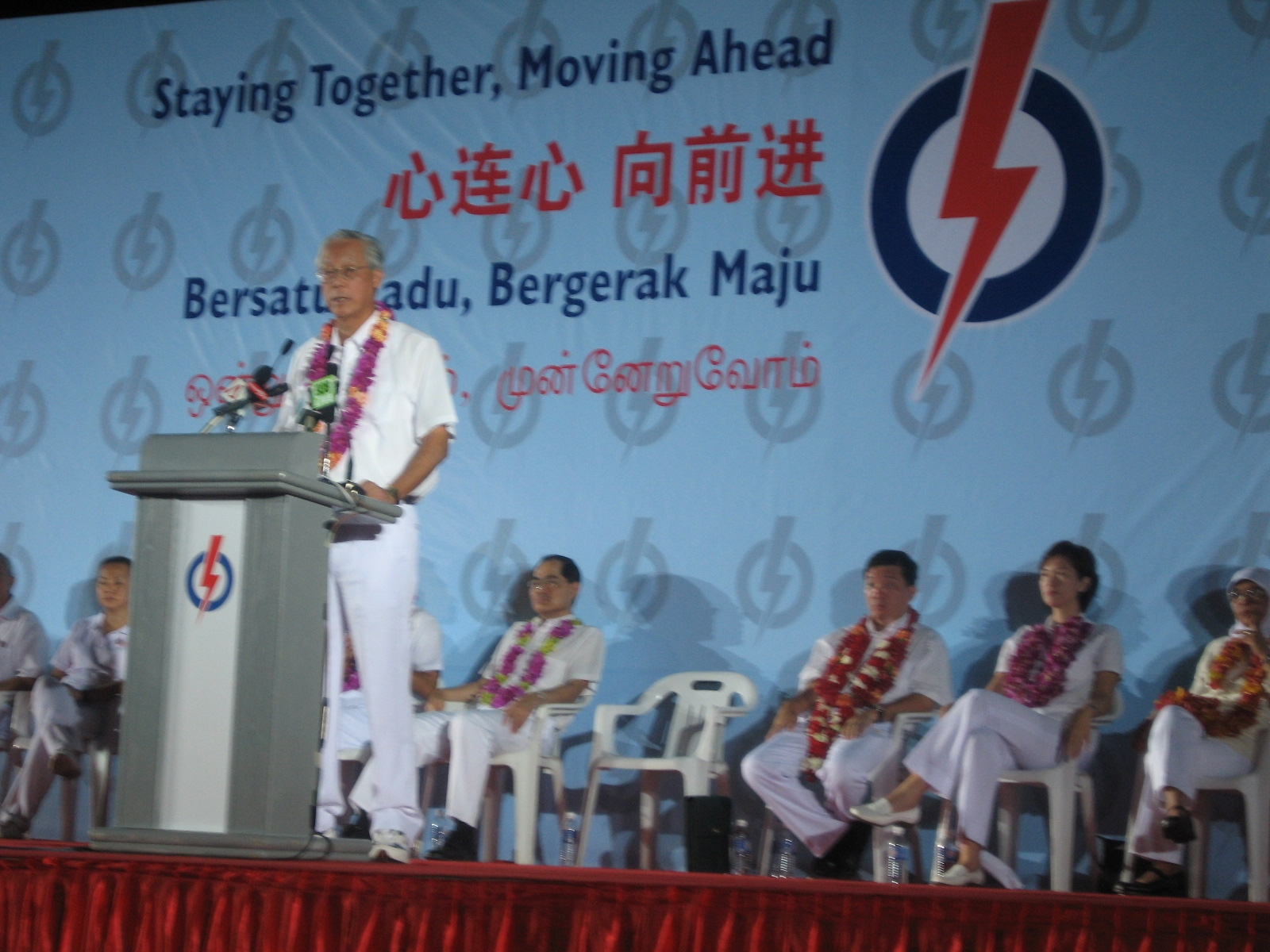
Goh Chok Tong of the PAP, speaking at a rally at Potong Pasir SMC. The banner behind him shows the campaign slogan of the party, "Staying Together, Moving Ahead".

On 19 March, Lee Hsien Loong aims a goal to win every 84 seats and citing that they would want to wrestle back the opposition-held wards of Hougang SMC and Potong Pasir SMC, citing that it is not a "masak-masak" (literally mean a children's game in Malay). The PAP candidates for these two wards will be Eric Low and Sitoh Yih Pin respectively, who previously contested in their respective wards unsuccessfully and had been working the ground in these wards since. They were assisted by Goh Chok Tong who had been given the special assignment to help the PAP win the two wards.

Goh had suggested that if Low and Sitoh won the election, they would be given extra latitude when speaking and voting in parliament and not be subjected to the political Whip. Goh also said that he would help Sitoh to gain a post in the new Cabinet should Sitoh be elected. Hougang and Potong Pasir residents were also promised upgrades $100 and $80 million if PAP manages to retake both seats. Both of these constituencies have been denied the chance to upgrade their estates as well as to provide lifts that stop on every floor, for as long as they are in opposition hands. When the PAP shaved WP's vote share from 58% to 55% in the last election, Goh had offered to upgrade Hougang estate if the WP's Low's share of vote was reduced to 52%.

As of the 2025 Singaporean general election, while Hougang had still yet to vote a PAP candidate in the parliament, Potong Pasir would be successful in the 2011 election despite winning by an inferior margin of under 2%; to date Potong Pasir has remained back in PAP's hands with better winning margins. Eric Low retired from politics before the next general election, while Sitoh would serve for three terms before ultimately retiring in 2025.

=== Nomination forms ===
As of 21 April, the day following the issue of the writ of election, 39 nomination forms were collected from the Elections Department office at Prinsep Street in which 20 were for Single-seat constituencies and the remaining 19 for Group Representative Constituencies. These included 18 applications to the Malay Community Committee and 13 for the Indian and other minority committee. The Elections Department has also received five donation reports and declaration forms.

=== Remarks in The New Democrat ===
In April 2006, the SDP published an article headlined "Govt's role in the NKF scandal" in the SDP party newspaper, The New Democrat, about the National Kidney Foundation Singapore scandal. On 22 April, letters of demand were served on 12 individuals and the publisher. Drew and Napier, the law firm acting for Lee Hsien Loong and Lee Kuan Yew, says that the newspaper article alleges that the two Lees are "dishonest and unfit for office", that Lee Kuan Yew "devised a corrupt political system for the benefit of the political elite", and that he managed the Government of Singapore Investment Corporation in a "corrupt manner". In addition, according to the letter of demand, the newspaper also alleged that Lee Hsien Loong had "perpetuated a corrupt political system for the benefit of the political elite" and how he and his Government "had access to the information which has now been unearthed about NKF but corruptly concealed and covered up the facts to avoid criticism". The letters demand that damages be paid and an apology made in the media by 25 April.

On 22 April, the lawyer acting for the Central Executive Committee of the SDP had said that he was instructed to defend the case vigorously.

As of 27 April, four of SDP's eleven committee members had publicly apologised, while the chairman of the party had refused to apologise as it would constitute "an admission of guilt". An apology has been formally rejected by the party, though it would not oppose individual members from making personal apologies. M Ravi, the lawyer representing most of the accused, has rejected claims made in the letters that allegations made in the paper were "highly defamatory", and he "[does] not see how a government or public body could be defamed". On 27 April, Chee said that the threat of legal action is already seriously affecting SDP's campaign at Sembawang GRC: "Lawyers for Mr Lee Kuan Yew and Mr Lee Hsien Loong have gone as far as to sue the printer, so much so that he is so frightened he dares not publish our election material." SDP was still seen selling the publication, and the Lees are seeking aggravated damages.

After the Polling Day, a meeting on the defamation suit was called by Francis Yong, vice-chairman of the SDP, in the SDP headquarters. At that time the Chee siblings had yet to make an apology, the meeting was to persuade the siblings to do so, but was unsuccessful. Lawrence Lai, a member of the Centre Executive Committee, walked out after an hour of the meeting, while others declined to comment.

=== SDP podcast ===
On 25 April, Elections Department warned SDP that it would take action against the party if they did not take down the audio files and podcasts from the party's website as it is against election advertising regulations under the Parliamentary Elections Act. Within hours after the notice was issued, SDP posted a notice on its website that the podcast service was suspended. Nonetheless, as of 29 April, a podcast of an interview with J B Jeyaretnam was still accessible on the website server, although there is no hyperlink to it.

=== Remarks on "First World Government" ===
Several politicians are engaging in exchanges surrounding the phrase "First World". It started with Lee Kuan Yew (PAP) who said "We want to have a First World parliament for Singapore, so we need to have a First World government and a First World opposition. If you want us to treat you as gentlemen, argue on the merits of your policy and our policy. Take it to a higher level and we will treat you accordingly and respond accordingly."

On 24 April, Low Thia Khiang (WP) responded saying that the PAP was not a "First World" government, and rather that instead the Workers' Party was the hope for a "First World" government.

Lee then rebutted on 25 April that if the PAP did not have the capabilities of a "First World" government, Singapore would not have risen up to the First World standards as measured by several world bodies. He added that "The WP under Low Thia Khiang must take this opportunity, having got rid of Jeyaratnam, to begin the process of getting the WP to First World standards."

James Gomez (WP) joined in the fray on 28 April, saying "Singaporeans and Singapore are "First World". There is no doubt in my mind, but it does not mean that the government and the PAP are "First World." Don't claim credit. Singaporeans and Singapore are First World, and this is the message I want to leave with you today. You are "First World", Singapore is First World but the PAP government is not."

In a news release posted at WP's website on 29 April, Low reiterated that PAP was not a "First World" government and took the opportunity to raise the issue of ministerial pay. He criticised the PAP for not "bench-marking itself politically against the matured Democracies around the world although ministers' salaries are bench-marked against international corporate's standards."

=== Other pre–nomination day events ===
On 14 January, Workers' Party Secretary-General Low Thia Khiang revealed that the party was planning to contest in four GRCs (Ang Mo Kio, Aljunied, Sembawang, and East Coast) and in three SMCs (Nee Soon East, Joo Chiat, and Hougang). Four days later, the Singapore Democratic Alliance had announced its intention to field candidates in three GRCs (Tampines, Jalan Besar and Pasir Ris–Punggol) and five SMCs (Potong Pasir, Choa Chu Kang, Bukit Timah, Ayer Rajah and MacPherson). Sin Kek Tong, Chairman of SPP, will contest in MacPherson SMC.

On 3 March, Steve Chia, Secretary-General of National Solidarity Party (NSP) had said that the party planned to contest Chua Chu Kang SMC, Bukit Panjang SMC, and Yio Chu Kang SMC. NSP will also attempt to field a team to contest Jalan Besar GRC. Following the release of the electoral boundaries, Chia expressed disappointment that there were no three-seat or four-seat GRCs that he had suggested in a parliament session. He told The New Paper: "The PAP still wants its MPs to hide behind GRCs. I'm not surprised. I'm disappointed." Chia was expected to contest in Choa Chu Kang SMC again. To help fund his election campaign, Chia launched a book which documented the speeches he made in Parliament over the last four years. Yip Yew Weng, President of NSP, will contest in Yio Chu Kang SMC.

Lianhe Zaobao reported that Singapore Democratic Party (SDP) was planning to contest Jurong GRC, Bukit Panjang SMC and Nee Soon Central SMC. SDP's chairman Ling How Doong had then been expected to contest in Bukit Panjang SMC. Christopher Neo Ting Wei, SDP's Assistant Treasurer, led a team to contest in Jurong GRC; among his team members were Chee Siok Chin, a member of SDP's Central Executive Committee (CEC) and sister of Chee Soon Juan.

On 4 March, Lim Boon Heng, Chairman of PAP, said that at least a quarter of the party's candidates would be new faces. The PAP had also not finalised their candidates list at this point. Lim Hwee Hua (PAP), MP for Marine Parade GRC for the Serangoon Gardens district, ended up contesting in the Aljunied GRC due to changes made in the electoral boundaries; the ward eventually faced a rare contest possibility that would involve three female politicians: including Cynthia Phua (PAP) and Sylvia Lim (WP).

On 6 March, Today reported that three people have recently left Singapore Democratic Party, including Cheo Chai Chen who was a member of parliament for Nee Soon Central from 1991 to 1997. Yip Yew Weng, President of NSP, said that they have joined his party.

Chiam See Tong (SPP) announced on 9 March that he would seek his sixth term as MP for Potong Pasir SMC, and denied earlier speculations that he would retire or lead a team to contest a GRC. Chiam however had noted that it was important for the opposition to capture at least one constituency, explaining that "the psychological effect will be tremendous. If one stronghold is toppled, the rest may just follow like falling dominoes." Chiam is expected to face another rematch from the PAP candidate Sitoh Yih Pin on his ward at Potong Pasir.

Ooi Boon Ewe, a property executive who contested in Joo Chiat SMC in 2001 as an independent, had said that he is forming a new political party and that he would contest in either Joo Chiat, Yio Chu Kang, or Chua Chu Kang SMC. His party would later become People's Liberal Democratic Party, but his party was approved on 2 May, thus making him unable to contest.

== Post–nomination day to election day events ==
These are the events of political parties, candidates and highlights during the campaigning period from 27 April to 6 May 2006.

=== Election rallies ===
On 27 April, the Singapore Police Force (SPF) released a list of 24 sites for election rallies scheduled to be held from 28 April to 5 May. All sites were for evening rallies that were scheduled to occur from 7 p.m. to 10 pm, except for a "Lunchtime Rally Site" at Boat Quay next to UOB Plaza.

Outdoor election meetings were required to be licensed by permits, and were issued by the SPF Police Election Meetings Office on a first-come, first-served basis, starting from 27 April. Since the morning of 26 April, more than 20 people, agents of the parties and candidates, were seen gathered at the office preparing to queue overnight for the permits.

=== List of election rallies ===
Date	Time	Party	Constituency	Location
28 April	7 p.m.-10 p.m.	PAP	Aljunied GRC	Serangoon Stadium
28 April	7 p.m.-10 p.m.	PAP	Chua Chu Kang SMC	Choa Chu Kang Park
28 April	7 p.m.-10 p.m.	SDA	Potong Pasir SMC	Open field at Potong Pasir Avenue 1 in front of Blk 147
28 April	7 p.m.-10 p.m.	WP	Aljunied GRC	Open field at Ubi Avenue 1 and Ubi Avenue 3
29 April	7 p.m.-10 p.m.	PAP	East Coast GRC	Open field bounded by Tampines Avenues 1 and 5, beside SAFRA Tampines
29 April	7 p.m.-10 p.m.	PAP	Yio Chu Kang SMC	Yio Chu Kang Stadium
29 April	7 p.m.-10 p.m.	WP	Nee Soon East SMC	Open field at Yishun Avenue 11 and Yishun Ring Road
29 April	7 p.m.-10 p.m.	SDP	Sembawang GRC	Woodlands Stadium
29 April	7 p.m.-10 p.m.	SDA	Tampines GRC	Tampines Stadium
29 April	7 p.m.-10 p.m.	SDA	Chua Chu Kang SMC	Choa Chu Kang Park
29 April	7 p.m.-10 p.m.	SDA	Pasir Ris–Punggol GRC	Open field at junction of Sengkang Central and Sengkang East Ave beside Buangkok MRT station
30 April	7 p.m.-10 p.m.	PAP	Sembawang GRC	Woodlands Stadium
30 April	7 p.m.-10 p.m.	PAP	Potong Pasir SMC	Open field bounded by Upper Serangoon Road, Meyappa Chettair Road and Potong Pasir Avenue 1
30 April	7 p.m.-10 p.m.	PAP	Nee Soon East SMC	Open field bounded by Yishun Ring Road and Yishun Avenue 11, beside Northbrooks Secondary School
30 April	7 p.m.-10 p.m.	WP	Hougang SMC	Open field in front of Blk 837 Hougang Avenue 4
30 April	7 p.m.-10 p.m.	SDP	Bukit Panjang SMC	Open field at Blk 511 Jelapang Road
30 April	7 p.m.-10 p.m.	SDA	Yio Chu Kang SMC	Yio Chu Kang Stadium
1 May	7 p.m.-10 p.m.	PAP	Hougang SMC	Open field in front of Blk 837 Hougang Avenue 4
1 May	7 p.m.-10 p.m.	WP	Joo Chiat SMC	Open field bounded by East Coast Park Service Road and Siglap Canal, near East Coast Park Car park D1
1 May	7 p.m.-10 p.m.	SDA	Jalan Besar GRC	Open field along Jalan Tenteram near Blk 65A JTC factory
1 May	7 p.m.-10 p.m.	PAP	Pasir Ris–Punggol GRC	Open field near Pasir Ris Park Carpark C, bounded by Pasir Ris Drive 3, Pasir Ris Green and Sungei Api Api
1 May	7 p.m.-10 p.m.	SDP	Sembawang GRC	Woodlands Stadium
2 May	7 p.m.-10 p.m.	SDA	Choa Chu Kang SMC	Choa Chu Kang Park
2 May	7 p.m.-10 p.m.	WP	East Coast GRC	Open field bounded by Tampines Avenue 1 and Tampines Avenue 5, beside SAFRA Tampines
2 May	7 p.m.-10 p.m.	PAP	Jalan Besar GRC	Open field in Jalan Tenteram, near Block 65A Jurong Town Corporation factory
2 May	7 p.m.-10 p.m.	SDA	MacPherson SMC	Open field bounded by Geylang East Central, Aljunied Avenue 1 and 2, beside multi-storey car park and Block 118
2 May	7 p.m.-10 p.m.	PAP	Nee Soon Central SMC	Open field bounded by Yishun Avenue 2, Yishun Central 1 and Yishun Central 2, behind Yishun Polyclinic
2 May	7 p.m.-10 p.m.	SDP	Sembawang GRC	Hard court opposite Block 325 and Sembawang Neighbourhood Police Centre, bounded by Sembawang Crescent, Sembawang Drive and Sembawang Avenue
3 May	12 p.m.-3 p.m.	PAP		Boat Quay, next to UOB Plaza (lunchtime rally)
3 May	7 p.m.-10 p.m.	WP	Nee Soon Central SMC	Open field bounded by Yishun Avenue 2, Yishun Central 1 and Yishun Central 2, behind Yishun Polyclinic
3 May	7 p.m.-10 p.m.	PAP	Nee Soon East SMC	Open field bounded by Yishun Ring Road, and Yishun Avenue 11, beside Northbrooks Secondary School
3 May	7 p.m.-10 p.m.	PAP	Tampines GRC	Tampines Stadium
3 May	7 p.m.-10 p.m.	SDP	Sembawang GRC	Woodlands Stadium
3 May	7 p.m.-10 p.m.	SDA	Yio Chu Kang SMC	Yio Chu Kang Stadium
4 May	7 p.m.-10 p.m.	PAP	Aljunied GRC	Serangoon Stadium
4 May	7 p.m.-10 p.m.	PAP	Hougang SMC	Open field in front of Block 537, bounded by Hougang Avenue 4 and Hougang Central
4 May	7 p.m.-10 p.m.	PAP	Potong Pasir SMC	Open field bounded by Upper Serangoon Road, Meyappa Chettair Road and Potong Pasir Avenue 1
4 May	7 p.m.-10 p.m.	PAP	Pasir Ris–Punggol GRC	Open field bounded by Sengkang Central, Sengkang East Road, Sengkang East Avenue and Buangkok Drive, beside Buangkok MRT station
4 May	7 p.m.-10 p.m.	PAP	MacPherson SMC	Open field bounded by Geylang East Central, Aljunied Avenues 1 and 2, beside multi-storey car park and Block 118
4 May	7 p.m.-10 p.m.	SDA	Jalan Besar GRC	Open field along Jalan Tenteram near Block 65A Jurong Town Corporation factory
4 May	7 p.m.-10 p.m.	SDA	Choa Chu Kang SMC	Choa Chu Kang Park bounded by Kranji Expressway and along Choa Chu Kang Drive
4 May	7 p.m.-10 p.m.	SDA	Pasir Ris–Punggol GRC	Open field beside Pasir Ris Park Carpark C, bounded by Pasir Ris Green and Sungei Api Api
4 May	7 p.m.-10 p.m.	WP	Ang Mo Kio GRC	Open field bounded by Ang Mo Kio Streets 51 and 52
5 May	7 p.m.-10 p.m.	PAP	Sembawang GRC	Hard court opposite Block 325 and Sembawang NPC, bounded by Sembawang Crescent, Sembawang Drive and Sembawang Avenue
5 May	7 p.m.-10 p.m.	PAP	Hougang SMC	Open field in front of Block 837, bounded by Hougang Avenue 4 and Hougang Central
5 May	7 p.m.-10 p.m.	PAP	Bukit Panjang SMC	Open field opposite Block 511 Jelapang Road, bounded by Sejar Road and Bukit Panjang Ring Road
5 May	7 p.m.-10 p.m.	PAP	Nee Soon East SMC	Open field bounded by Yishun Rong Road and Yishun Avenue 11, beside Northbrooks Secondary School
5 May	7 p.m.-10 p.m.	PAP	Choa Chu Kang SMC	Choa Chu Kang Park bounded by Kranji Expressway and along Choa Chu Kang Drive
5 May	7 p.m.-10 p.m.	WP	Aljunied GRC	Serangoon Stadium
5 May	7 p.m.-10 p.m.	SDA	Potong Pasir SMC	Open field bounded by Upper Serangoon Road, Meyappa Chettair Road and Potong Pasir Avenue 1

On 28 April, the first election rally for the People's Action Party was forced a change in venue from Serangoon Stadium to an indoor location due to inclement weather.

=== Reactions to nomination day ===
When nominations were completed, opposition parties had successfully contested more than half the seats, thus denying PAP a walkover majority to form a government on nomination day, the first time since 1988. Lee Hsien Loong's response stated that he was happy that there were many opposition candidates contesting in the election, and said it is good for the maturation of Singapore's political system. He accepted the challenge from the opposition saying that "we [the PAP] don't have a majority, so we will fight this election." Workers' Party chairman Sylvia Lim said that her party would fight for more seats in parliament but did not expect to topple the PAP government. "There is no way the opposition will win every seat they contest," she said. Steve Chia (NSP) had said earlier that the SDA's aim was to win 15 seats and form a shadow cabinet, to provide effective scrutiny for the government.

For WP, their GRC team consisting of candidates led by chairman Sylvia Lim, challenged Aljunied GRC (led by Foreign Minister George Yeo) in the election. WP also fielded a young team in Ang Mo Kio GRC, with candidates mostly in their 20s or early 30s, to compete with the flagship PAP team led by Lee Hsien Loong.

For SDA, its strongest GRC team was one that contested Jalan Besar GRC (led by Sebastian Teo and included a former MP Cheo Chai Chen). The hotly-watched SMCs include Chua Chu Kang (a ward which saw a close contest between the PAP and SDA in 2001 elections), Nee Soon East (one of two WP-contested wards in 2001 elections), as well as the two opposition-held wards, Hougang and Potong Pasir.

=== Negative campaigning ===
After nomination day, the PAP had stepped up its negative campaigning effort against the opposition. Lee Kuan Yew (PAP) had referred the opposition as not having "First World" quality and described some of their candidates as of poor quality and lacking in "intellectual content". He repeated his attack on 28 April saying "I want a world-class opposition, not this riffraff."

Lim Boon Heng (PAP) said that the SDP is already being written off by Singaporeans. Lee Hsien Loong said the opposition had no clear vision or views on Singapore's major challenges.

On 29 April, PM Lee Hsien Loong referred to his opponents at Ang Mo Kio GRC, the relatively young WP team, as "敢死队" (suicide squad) adding that even the bookies will not take a bet on the outcome in that constituency contest.

In response, WP's chief Low Thia Khiang said that it is better to be a "敢死队" (suicide squad) rather than a "怕死队" (squad that is scared to die). WP's candidate Yaw Shin Leong added that: "my courageous team-mates and myself are mentally prepared to lose but that does not mean we are push-overs."

=== James Gomez saga ===
Controversy arose during the election surrounding the application for a minority-race candidate certificate by WP candidate James Gomez. On 24 April, Gomez went to the Elections Department to fill up the minority-race candidate certificate application form accompanied by WP's chairman Sylvia Lim. Instead of handing in the application form to election official, Gomez slipped the form in his bag. At the time, Lim had gone to a waiting area and did not witness the event. However, on the eve of Nomination Day, James Gomez went to collect his minority-race candidate certificate claiming he had submitted the application form. Following two days of dispute between both sides, the Elections Department was able to produce video evidence showing that James Gomez did not submit the application form; a day later, James Gomez apologised to the Elections Department saying he was distracted by his busy schedule.

During the controversy, PAP raised questions about the credibility of James Gomez. He was also accused of attempting to discredit the Elections Department by claiming they misplaced the form. Despite not having enough concrete video or audio evidence, Deputy Prime Minister Wong Kan Seng and Minister Mentor Lee Kuan Yew called James Gomez a "liar" and Lee Kuan Yew dared Gomez to sue him and Wong Kan Seng. George Yeo (PAP) also suggested that WP should sack Gomez and field a four-member team for the five-member Group Representation Constituency.

=== Party political broadcast ===
Four contesting parties made their political broadcasts over television and radio in the four official languages — the English, Mandarin, Malay and Tamil languages, on broadcasts on 29 April and 4 May, respectively. Each party was given an allocated time based on the number of candidates it fielded. The People's Action Party (PAP) was given 12 minutes with 84 candidates fielded, the Workers' Party (WP) and Singapore Democratic Alliance (SDA) were given 4.5 minutes each with 20 candidates fielded, and the Singapore Democratic Party (SDP) was given 2.5 minutes with 7 candidates fielded. The English broadcasts are available on YouTube.

==== SDP broadcast ====
The SDP was represented by Chee Siok Chin on both days. Chee said that while the ministers were enjoying high salaries, the lowest income group in Singapore were facing greater financial burden compounded by increasing cost of living. She said that financial difficulty has contributed to higher divorce, suicide rates and increase in bankruptcy filed in recent years.

Chee declared in the 4 May broadcast that the Ministers were paying themselves the highest political salaries in the world. She also declared that the PAP is trying to undermine the SDP, but the SDP will stand strong.

==== WP broadcast ====
The WP was represented by its chairman Sylvia Lim on 29 April. Lim said that the Workers' Party has a committed group of candidates in this election to pursue greater democracy in Singapore. She criticised the PAP for using taxpayers' money to selective upgrade constituencies that voted for the PAP. She called this a narrow-minded and divisive policy, and it encourages voters to act on self-interests instead of national interests. She added that this threatened to split the fabric of the nation, and run contrary to the spirit of national service that calls for personal sacrifice. She further labelled this as a time bomb and that it set a bad precedent on how the government allocates public funds and service. She asked voters not to succumb to the threat of the PAP, and to vote for the opposition needed to press the government on other important policies such as containing the cost of transport, utility and healthcare.

Lim also criticised the PAP for using public funding to give bonuses before election, calling it a populist budget. She also point out that the PAP had used its position as the government to entrench and promote the party through public funded grassroots organisations. She questioned whether PAP is a first world government, which she said should put national interests ahead of party interests, and operate on a level playing field.

Tan Hui Hua represented the WP on 4 May.

==== SDA broadcast ====
SDA's Secretary-general, Chiam See Tong, read the party's political broadcast on both 29 April and 4 May. Chiam pointed out that in this election, the PAP is aiming to win all seats. He asked voters whether they want a one-party system. Chiam argued that a multi-party system would be needed for democracy to survive in Singapore, and that a free Singapore with room for diverse views and opinions would be necessary for the social, cultural and political well-being of the people. Chiam urged the people to act decisively to vote for the opposition, to ensure that Singapore would not degenerate into a one-party state. He said that "a vibrant and cosmopolitan Singapore needs creativity of the mind" and that "these can only flourish in an atmosphere of freedom and an environment where there is no fear." He reminded viewers of the old saying, "absolute power corrupts absolutely."

==== PAP broadcast ====
PAP's political broadcast was read by its Secretary-general Lee Hsien Loong on 29 April. Lee highlighted the successes of the PAP government since the last election, especially in creating jobs, reducing unemployment, retraining workers, and investing in young people. He argued that the strategies were working and economy was striving, and that PAP had united the people under the threat of terrorism. He reminded viewers that Singapore would have great opportunities as well as major challenges ahead as Asia was rising, and the PAP would make Singapore a land of opportunity for all people, and each person could find his or her own niche and excel. He said that the government would educate each Singaporean to be the best they can be.

Lee said that the country must ensure that as it progresses, that no one is left behind, and to help those who have difficulty keeping up. He gives this reason for implementing the progress package that was given out. Lee said that the PAP government would take care of older Singaporeans and help them work longer. PAP would install elevators on every floor of every HDB block, make the city barrier free and transport system wheelchair friendly.

He continued to say that the PAP would make medical care more affordable, and the coverage of Medisave would be extended. He said these strategies would improve the lives of all Singaporeans and help create a fair and just society and a safe and harmonious community. He added that the PAP is the best team assembled; it is a diverse team with candidates committed to serve. He asked viewers for support, to help build a nation where every person could develop himself to the fullest and everyone contributed to "this vibrant city".

=== Debate on housing and lift upgrading ===
The upgrading of public housing, including the Lift Upgrading Programme (LUP), is a major issue in this election. As in previous elections, the PAP had tied the scheduling of housing upgrades to the number of votes the party received in the election. The PAP argues that government is successful in raising the standard of living in the country, and those who support its various policies, including the upgrading, should be given priority. In the hotly contested Aljunied GRC, George Yeo (PAP) has placed lift upgrading the "top of [his] priority list" so that the lift would stop on every floor in as many blocks as possible.

Sylvia Lim (WP) accused the PAP of being selective in its upgrading programmes, arguing that this is a divisive policy.

=== Large turnout at opposition election rallies ===
The election featured large turnouts at some of the election rallies of the opposition parties, which was unheard of since the 1980s. A report by Malaysian press The Star estimated that around 10,000 people attended the Workers' Party rally on 30 April at Hougang. At the last rally of the Workers' Party at Serangoon Stadium on 5 May, the audience filled up most of the field and even spilled outside the stadium.

The PAP dismissed the significance of the crowds, saying that it does not necessarily translate into votes.

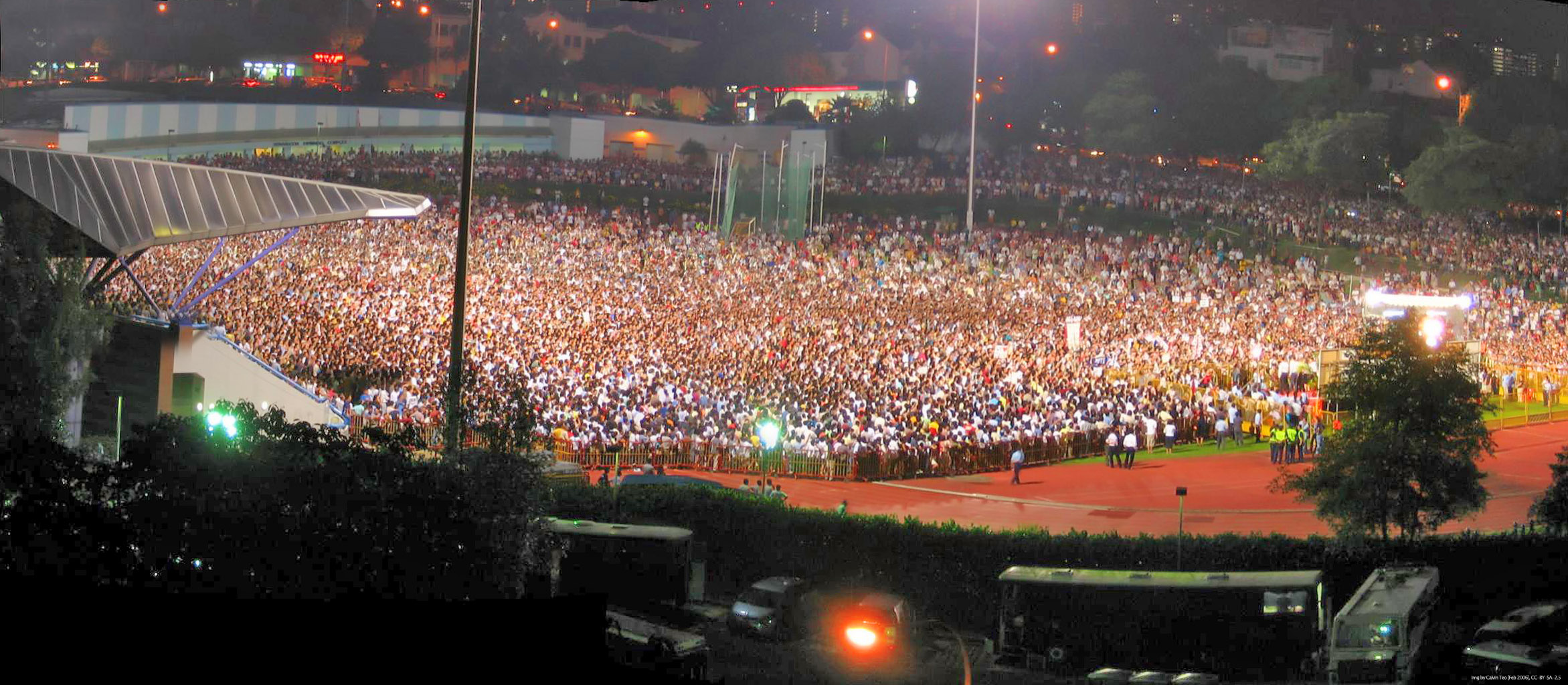
A large number of supporters turn up at the last Worker's Party Rally for Aljunied GRC, filling up much of the field in Serangoon Stadium.
