= Jurong Pioneer Junior College =

- 裕廊先驱初级学院; Maktab Rendah Jurong Perintis முன்னோடி ஜூனியர் கல்லூரி

Location
- 21 Teck Whye Walk; Singapore 688258; 1°23′4.83″N 103°45′16.27″E

Information
- Type: Government
- Motto: While I Live, I Learn Plus Ultra
- Established: 1981 (as Jurong Junior College); 1999 (as Pioneer Junior College); 2019 (merged into Jurong Pioneer Junior College)
- Session: Single-session
- School code: 0718
- Principal: Mr Kevin Ang
- Enrolment: 780 (J1), 930 (J2)
- Houses: Taurus, Aries, Ursa, Pavo, Aquila, Volans
- Colour: Maroon Navy
- Song: Crescendo
- Vision: A college with a heart to serve and the courage to venture.
- Mission: To nurture a community of active learners, innovative thinkers and compassionate leaders, with confidence for the future.
- Website: jpjc.moe.edu.sg

Jurong Pioneer Junior College (JPJC) is a junior college in Singapore offering a two-year pre-university course leading up to the Singapore-Cambridge GCE Advanced Level examination. The college was formed from the merger of Jurong Junior College and Pioneer Junior College in January 2019.

== History ==
=== Foundation years ===
Pioneer Junior College was established on 2 January 2000, with the inaugural principal, Mr. Kwek Hiok Chuang making the news as Singapore's youngest principal in history. The college initially was located at the former campus of the French-German Institute of Singapore, along Science Centre Road. The college relocated to the current permanent campus at 21 Teck Whye Walk in December 2004. It was officially declared open by Mr. Tharman Shanmugaratnam, then acting Minister of Education on 20 February 2004.

Sixty-two teachers and executive and administrative staff, and three hundred students, were the first batch of Pioneers of Pioneer Junior College (the "Pioneer Pioneers"). Students were involved in the formation of the college rules and the design of the college crest and uniform. The college's vision and mission statements were formally endorsed on 31 August 2000 by the College Advisory Committee, students' parents, the staff and students. In the subsequent year, on 8 August 2001, the college anthem and flag were formally adopted by the college community.

On 25 February 2002, PJC became the first junior college to launch its own satellite ground receiving station. Its inaugural College Day was held on 26 April 2002 to award deserving pioneers who had contributed in one way or another to the college. The guest-of-honour was the Chairman of the College Advisory Committee, Professor Phua Kok Khoo.

in 2007, the college organised the Ministry of Education (MOE) Pre- University Seminar, which featured the inaugural participation of polytechnics and Integrated Programme schools.

=== Integration of Jurong Junior College ===
On 20 April 2017, it was announced that Jurong Junior College will be integrated into Pioneer Junior College with effect from January 2019, with the new name as Jurong Pioneer Junior College, which is a combination of the two schools' names. JJC's current principal, Dr Hang Kim Hoo, will take over as the principal of Jurong Pioneer Junior College. This was in view of the declining enrollment into junior colleges since 2014, attributed to the fall in Singapore's birth rate. The merger process is to be completed by January 2019.

== Principals ==
Name of Principal	Years served
Hang Kim Hoo	2019 - 2022
Kevin Ang Keng Jin	2023–Present

== Identity & Culture ==
=== College insignia ===
Pioneer Junior College's insignia was designed by its pioneer batch of students in 2001. The 63° angle of the white part of the college crest in between the black and red parts correspond to the 63 staff serving in the college when it was first established.

=== Uniform ===
Jurong Pioneer Junior College's uniform was designed by alumni from JJC and PJC as well as its pioneer batch of students in 2018. The current uniform is a white shirt/blouse and dark blue pants/skirt. Students wear a maroon tie every Monday morning till 1030hrs. During other official events, students don grey blazers and ties.

=== House system ===
In Pioneer Junior College, there were six Houses under PJC House System, Owens, Byron, Darwin, Keller, Nobel and Polo, all named after Pioneers who have made an indelible mark in their field.

Students are allocated a house based on their civics grouping (classes). Competition among the six Houses takes place when the student executive committee takes up office-bearer positions. The competition includes events like the Inter-House Games (both sports and non-sports) and National Physical Fitness Award (NAPFA) test. The overall champion of all these events is awarded the Inter-House Challenge Trophy at the end of each office-bearer year. The House system seeks to encourage bonding between students and ultimately promote college spirit.

In the new Jurong Pioneer Junior College, the House system was changed to Taurus(Red), Aries(Orange), Ursa(Yello), Pavo(Green), Aquila(Light Blue) and Volans(Dark Blue) based on constellations.

== Campus ==
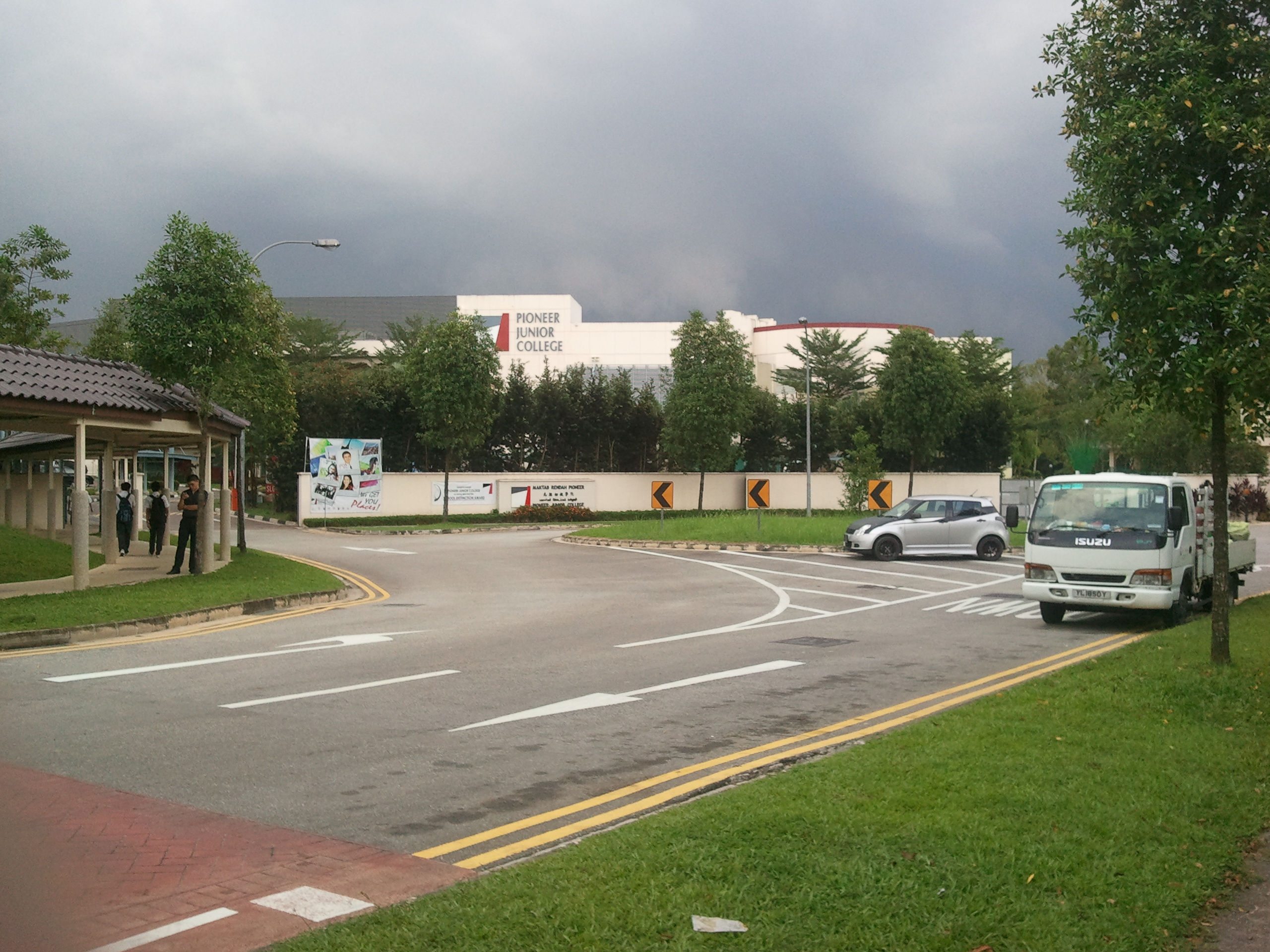
The main entrance of Pioneer Junior College

The campus of Pioneer Junior College, situated at 21 Teck Whye Walk, was officially opened by Acting Minister of Education Tharman Shanmugaratnam on 20 February 2004.

The campus is equipped with four lecture theatres for scheduled academic lectures, as well as college activities and performances. Lecture Theatre 4, the largest lecture theatre, have a maximum seating capacity of 600.

=== Ngee Ann Kong Si Library ===
The Ngee Ann Kong Si Library, the library of the college, features private consultants rooms within the library, each furnished with tables, chairs and a whiteboard. The library is also furnished with study cubicles, where students can study independently during breaks, after school or during night study sessions.

=== The Sanctuary ===
The Sanctuary is an air-conditioned facility located above the Ngee Ann Kong Si Auditorium, dedicated for student activity space operated by the college's Student Council. The dedicated area features couches and games to destress after classes.Students can visit the Sanctuary during opening hours scheduled by the Student Councillors.

Other facilities include the netball court, squash court, futsal court, basketball court, 8-lane track, field and the gym.

== Academic Information ==
Jurong Pioneer Junior College offers both the Art and Science streams leading up to the Singapore-Cambridge GCE Advanced Level examination.

=== Language Elective Programmes ===
Jurong Pioneer Junior College offers the Malay Language Elective Programme (MLEP) as well as the Chinese Language Elective Programme (CLEP), the former which was migrated from Pioneer Junior College, and the latter which was migrated from Jurong Junior College since January 2019.

== Notable alumni ==
- Ronny Chieng (PJC) - Comedian, actor and radio presenter based in New York City
- Eric Moo (JJC) - Singer
- Pornsak (JJC) - Host
- Pritam Singh (JJC)– Politician, former Leader of the Opposition, Member of Parliament for Aljunied GRC
- Desmond Tan (JJC) – Actor
- Ang Hin Kee (JJC) – Politician, Member of Parliament for Ang Mo Kio GRC
- Yaw Shin Leong (JJC) – Former Member of Parliament for Hougang SMC

== See also ==
- Education in Singapore
