= 2023 Island Wide League =

Island Wide League
- Season: 2023
- Champions: Bedok South Avenue
- Promoted: Tengah FC
- Matches: 34
- Top goalscorer: Hakim Abdullah (10 goals)

The 2023 Island Wide League is the 2023 season of the FAS Island Wide League (IWL), the fourth-tier Men's amateur football league in Singapore.

== Summary ==
At the conclusion of the 2023 season, the two finalists of the IWL shall be promoted to the Singapore Football League (SFL) Division Two for 2024 season.

On 5 September 2023, Simei United filed a protest against an opponent for fielding an ineligible player to the Football Association of Singapore (FAS). The protests was eventually dismissed as it was filed after 48 hours from the match on 19 August 2023.

Bedok South Avenue won the 2023 IWL title by beating Tengah FC 2–1 in the final on 2 October 2023 at Jalan Besar Stadium. As the top two teams in the league, both Bedok South Avenue SC and Tengah FC will be promoted to the FAS SFL 2 for 2024 season.

2023 IWL runners-up Tengah FC bided to become the 10th Singapore Premier League club for the 2024/25 season. The bid was unsuccessful.

== Competition Format ==
The IWL competition shall be played on a single round robin Group Stage basis, followed by a single leg Knockout Stage basis.

Teams have been split into five groups of four for the single round-robin group stage before the winner of each group, together with the three best second-placed teams, will proceed to the single-legged knock-out stage.

== Group Stage ==
=== Group A ===
Pos	Team	Pld	W	D	L	GF	GA	GD	Pts
1	GDT Circuit FC (Q)	3	2	0	1	9	3	+6	6
2	Woodlands Rangers FC	3	1	1	1	5	4	+1	4
3	GFA Victoria FC	3	1	1	1	5	7	−2	4
4	Winchester Isla FC	3	1	0	2	6	11	−5	3

Source: fas.org.sg
Rules for classification: 1) points; 2) goal difference; 3) number of goals scored; 4) number of wins
(Q) Qualified for the phase indicated

6 August 2023	GDT Circuit	2-3	GFA Victoria	St Wilfred Field
17:00 UTC+8	Zuhaili Suib; Danial Qaid	Report

6 August 2023	Woodlands Rangers	5-1	Winchester Isla	Serangoon Stadium
19:30 UTC+8	Abdul Razip 5'; Chua Jun Xu 40'; Shah Sharizan 65'; Shah Sharizan 68'; Min Ko Naing 85'	Report	Izzat Zakir Amin 24'

26 August 2023	GFA Victoria	0-0	Woodlands Rangers	Toa Payoh Stadium
19:30 UTC+8		Report

26 August 2023	Winchester Isla	0-4	GDT Circuit	Yishun Stadium
17:00 UTC+8		Report	Adnan Kasuma; Basit Hamid; Basit Hamid; Zuhaili Suib

2 September 2023	Woodlands Rangers	0-3	GDT Circuit	Clementi Stadium
19:30 UTC+8			Jumari Semin; Khairul Nizam; Khairul Nizam

2 September 2023	GFA Victoria	2-5	Winchester Isla	Serangoon Stadium
19:30 UTC+8

=== Group B ===
Pos	Team	Pld	W	D	L	GF	GA	GD	Pts
1	Westwood El'Junior FC (Q)	3	3	0	0	8	1	+7	9
2	Prisons SRC (Q)	3	2	0	1	6	1	+5	6
3	Verde Cresta Combined SC	3	1	0	2	4	7	−3	3
4	Pasirian Lions FC	3	0	0	3	1	10	−9	0

Source: fas.org.sg
Rules for classification: 1) points; 2) goal difference; 3) number of goals scored; 4) number of wins
(Q) Qualified for the phase indicated

12 August 2023	Pasirian Lions	0-3	Westwood El'Junior	Serangoon Stadium
17:30 UTC+8			Muhd Afiq

13 August 2023	Prisons SRC	2-0	Verde Cresta Combined	Serangoon Stadium
19:30 UTC+8

20 August 2023	Verde Cresta Combined	3-1	Pasirian Lions	St Wilfred Field
19:30 UTC+8	Danni (pen.); Afiq; Ryhan

3 September 2023	Westwood El'Junior	1-0	Prisons SRC	Serangoon Stadium
17:00 UTC+8

10 September 2023	Westwood El'Junior	4-1	Verde Cresta Combined	St Wilfred Field
19:30 UTC+8			Afiq

10 September 2023	Prisons SRC	4-0	Pasirian Lions	Serangoon Stadium
19:30 UTC+8

=== Group C ===
Pos	Team	Pld	W	D	L	GF	GA	GD	Pts
1	Marsiling Causeway Bay FC (Q)	3	1	2	0	6	4	+2	5
2	Gymkhana FC	3	1	1	1	4	4	0	4
3	Tanah Merah United FC	3	1	1	1	3	3	0	4
4	Bukit Timah FC	3	1	0	2	2	4	−2	3

Source: fas.org.sg
Rules for classification: 1) points; 2) goal difference; 3) number of goals scored; 4) number of wins
(Q) Qualified for the phase indicated

12 August 2023	Tanah Merah United	2-2	Marsiling Causeway Bay	Clementi Stadium
17:30 UTC+8

13 August 2023	Bukit Timah FC	1-2	Gymkhana FC	Clementi Stadium
19:30 UTC+8	Feeq

20 August 2023	Marsiling Causeway Bay	2-0	Bukit Timah FC	Hougang Stadium
19:30 UTC+8

3 September 2023	Gymkhana FC	0-1	Tanah Merah United	Yishun Stadium
17:00 UTC+8

10 September 2023	Marsiling Causeway Bay	2-2	Gymkhana FC	St Wilfred Field
19:30 UTC+8

10 September 2023	Bukit Timah FC	1-0	Tanah Merah United	Serangoon Stadium
19:30 UTC+8	Logesh

=== Group D ===
Pos	Team	Pld	W	D	L	GF	GA	GD	Pts
1	Yishun FC (Q)	3	3	0	0	9	4	+5	9
2	Bedok South Avenue SC (Q)	3	2	0	1	10	4	+6	6
3	Simei United FC	3	1	0	2	6	8	−2	3
4	Balestier United RC	3	0	0	3	6	15	−9	0

Source: fas.org.sg
Rules for classification: 1) points; 2) goal difference; 3) number of goals scored; 4) number of wins
(Q) Qualified for the phase indicated

19 August 2023	Yishun FC	5-2	Balestier United	Hougang Stadium
19:30 UTC+8	Shine Htet; Shafiq SA; Shafiq SA; Shafiq SA; Shine Htet	Report

19 August 2023	Bedok South Avenue	3-1	Simei United	Serangoon Stadium
19:30 UTC+8	Hakim; Hakim; Irfan	Report	(o.g.)

27 August 2023	Balestier United	1-6	Bedok South Avenue	St Wilfred Field
17:00 UTC+8		Report	Hakim; Hakim; Hakim; Hakim; Azrin; Azrin

27 August 2023	Simei United	1-2	Yishun FC	Serangoon Stadium
19:30 UTC+8	Jair Bonfim 32'		Shafiq SA; Shafiq SA

9 September 2023	Balestier United	3-4	Simei United	Clementi Stadium
19:30 UTC+8

9 September 2023	Bedok South Avenue	1-2	Yishun FC	Serangoon Stadium
19:30 UTC+8	Sasee	Report	Herman Selamat; Lim Sean

=== Group E ===
Pos	Team	Pld	W	D	L	GF	GA	GD	Pts
1	Tengah FC (Q)	2	2	0	0	8	2	+6	6
2	East Coast United FC (Q)	2	1	0	1	4	6	−2	3
3	Geylang Serai FC	2	0	0	2	2	6	−4	0

Source: fas.org.sg
Rules for classification: 1) points; 2) goal difference; 3) number of goals scored; 4) number of wins
(Q) Qualified for the phase indicated

13 August 2023	Tengah FC	3-1	Geylang Serai	St Wilfred Field
17:00 UTC+8

2 September 2023	Geylang Serai	1-3	East Coast United	Clementi Stadium
17:00 UTC+8

9 September 2023	East Coast United	1-5	Tengah FC	Clementi Stadium
17:00 UTC+8

== Knock-out Stage ==
=== Quarter Finals ===
16 September 2023	Marsiling Causeway Bay	1-3	East Coast United	Serangoon Stadium
19:30 UTC+8

17 September 2023	GDT Circuit FC	4-1	Yishun FC	Bedok Stadium
17:00 UTC+8	Khairul Nizam; Khairul Nizam; (o.g.); Khairul Nizam	Report	Shafiq SA

17 September 2023	Westwood El’Junior	2-3	Bedok South Avenue	Bedok Stadium
19:30 UTC+8

17 September 2023	Tengah FC	3-1	Prisons SRC	Serangoon Stadium
19:30 UTC+8

=== Semi Finals ===
23 September 2023	East Coast United	3-4	Bedok South Avenue	Jalan Besar Stadium

24 September 2023	GDT Circuit FC	0-3	Tengah FC	Serangoon Stadium
19:30 UTC+8		Report

=== Finals ===
1 October 2023	Bedok South Avenue	2-1	Tengah FC	Jalan Besar Stadium
17:30 UTC+8	Nur Irfan 45'; Azrin Junaidi 68'	Report	Saravanan Krishnamoorthy

== Awards ==
=== Top scorers ===
Rank	Player	Club	Goals
1	Hakim Abdullah	Bedok South Avenue SC	10
2	Danish Harith	East Coast United FC	8
3	Shafiq Abdullah	Yishun FC	6

Source: fas.org.sg

== See also ==
- Football in Singapore
- Football Association of Singapore
- 2023 Singapore Premier League
- 2023 Singapore Football League
