= Jurong Junior College =

Coordinates: 1.3511°N 103.7136°E

Jurong Junior College 裕廊初级学院 Maktab Rendah Jurong

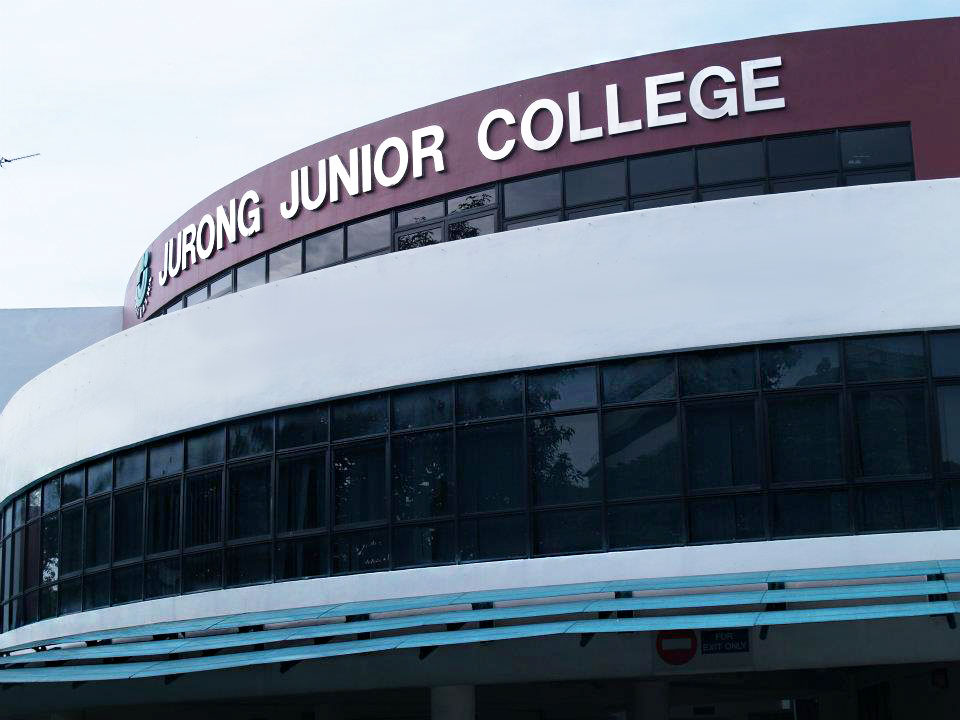

Location
- 800 Corporation Road, Singapore 649809

Information
- Type: Government
- Motto: Plus Ultra (Latin for "Further Beyond")
- Established: 1981; 45 years ago
- Closed: 2019; 7 years ago
- Session: Single
- School code: 0703
- Principal: Dr Hang Kim Hoo
- Enrolment: Approx. 1,650
- Colour: Brown Green
- Website: jurongjc.moe.edu.sg

Jurong Junior College (JJC) was a junior college located in Jurong West, Singapore. It was the ninth junior college to be established by the Ministry of Education of Singapore.

== History ==
Jurong Junior College was first situated at West Coast Road. The college started in April 1981 and opened its doors to the first batch of students in 1982. In January 1985, Jurong Junior College was relocated to 800 Corporation Road.

Jurong Junior College was designated as the 4th Language Elective Programme (Chinese) Centre by the MOE on 9 April 2005. The Chinese Language Elective Programme (CLEP) aimed to encourage students who were interested to further their studies in Chinese Language and Literature.

=== Merger ===
On 20 April 2017, the Ministry of Education announced the merger of several junior colleges including that of JJC which was to merge with Pioneer Junior College (PJC). The merged school will be located at the site of PJC. In 2018 it was announced that the merged JC will retain the original names of both schools – Jurong Pioneer Junior College. The merger was in view of the declining cohort sizes since 2014, which was attributed to the fall in Singapore's birth rate.

== Principals ==
Name	Years served
Hang Kim Hoo	2019–Present

=== Uniform ===
The full college uniform consisted of beige shirts and trousers for boys, and beige blouses and skirts for girls.

=== Local music heritage ===
Jurong Junior College was widely regarded as the cradle for Xinyao (Chinese:新谣), a genre of songs originated in the 1980s that is unique to Singapore, and which have had a strong influence in Singapore's music scene. Famous Xinyao bands that were formed in Jurong Junior College include Subway Xinyao band (地下铁新谣小组), who were known for their song "Night at the Subway" (夜在地下铁) from 1983 to the 1990s. Its main singers include local celebrity Eric Moo, who was a student at Jurong Junior College in the 1980s.

== Campus ==
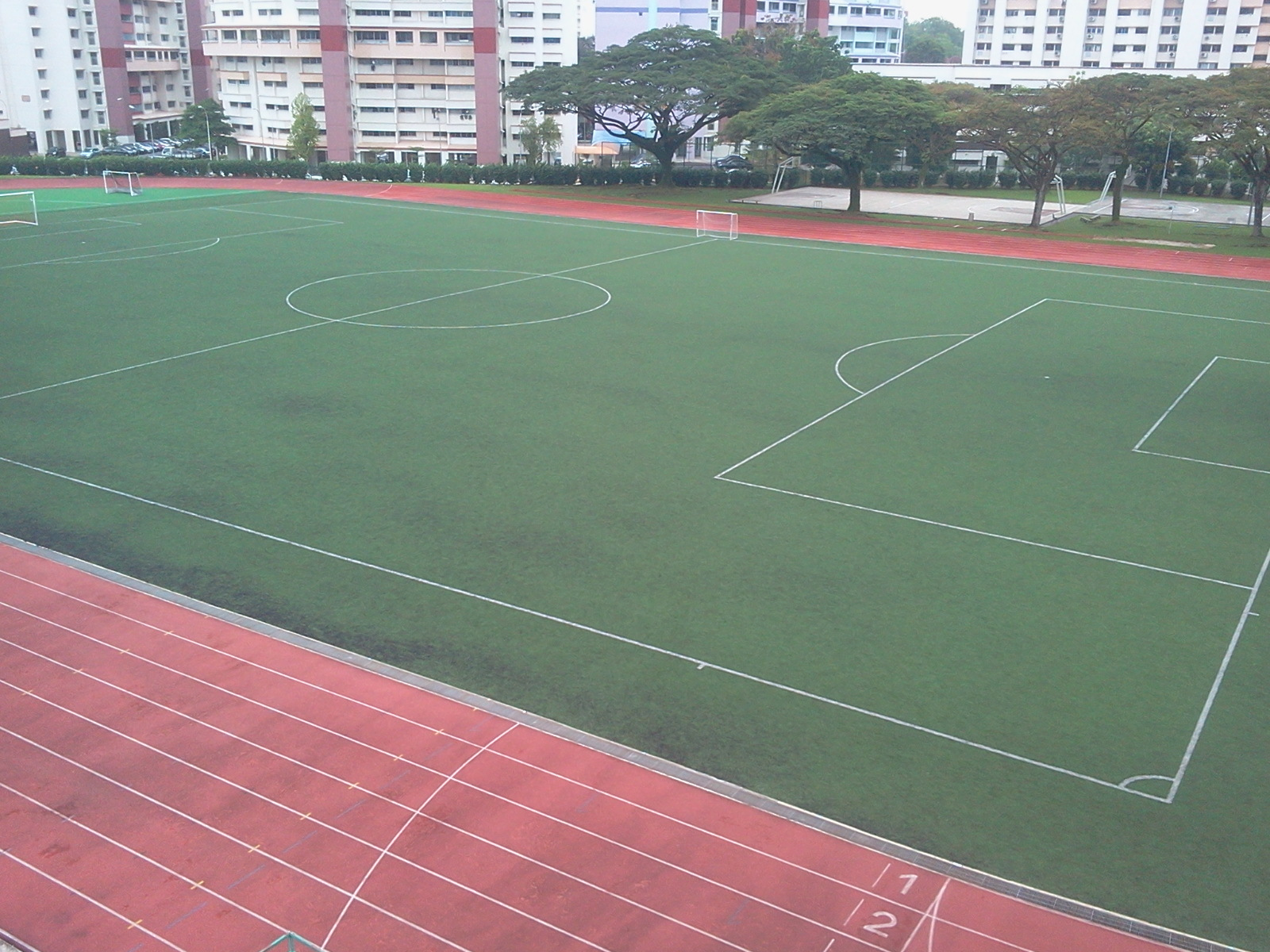
The synthetic field (viewed from the 4th storey of the PD Block)

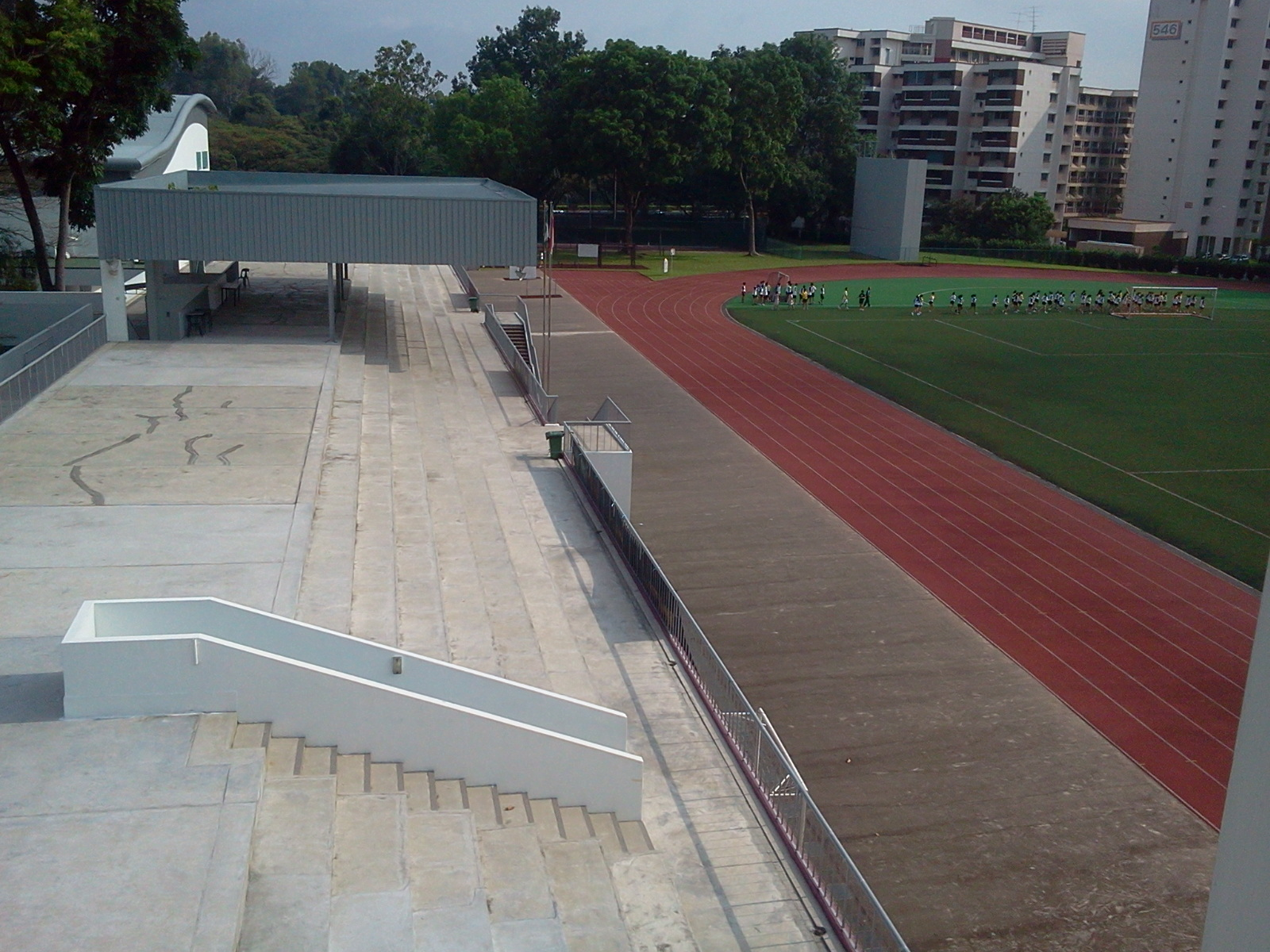
The stadium with a seating capacity of 1,500. The exterior of LT5 is seen at the left of the background

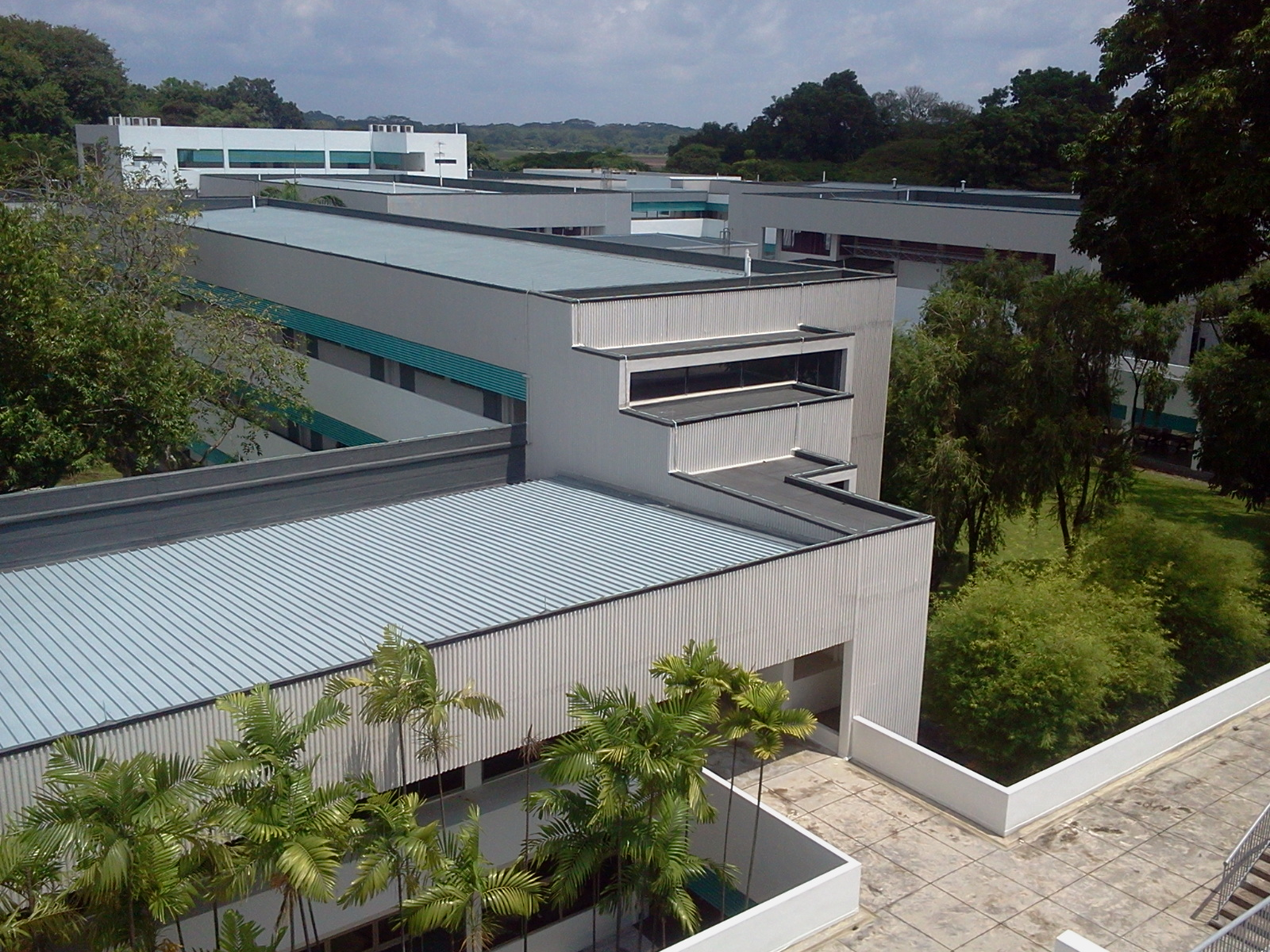
The classroom block

The premise of Jurong Junior College comprises 16 blocks. Some of the facilities include a 3-storey classroom block, a 2-storey library, computer laboratories, lecture theatres and a multi-purpose hall, all of which are air-conditioned. The college has five lecture theatres, with the 600-seater Lecture Theatre 5 (LT5) being the largest. Also, there is a 4-storey People Development (PD) block which houses various special rooms for the Chinese Language Elective Programme (CLEP), Racial Integration Programme and some CCAs such as Chinese Orchestra. The Leaders Network and Students' Council Room are at level 2, and the computer laboratories, with three labs in total and one Gambling lab, are at level 4.

The college has sport facilities such as a stadium holding a synthetic football field and a 400-metre 8-lane track with provision for field events and steeplechase. The stadium has a seating capacity of 1500. Sports and games facilities include four badminton courts in the college hall, table tennis facilities, two tennis courts, four multi-purpose courts for basketball, volleyball and netball, two squash courts as well as a semi-underground rifle range with ten targets. Apart from a gymnasium, there is an outdoor rock climbing wall and Physical Fitness Circuit with 12 stations. To add on, the rooftop of the PD block is equipped with zip-line (or often termed "flying fox") and abseiling facilities.

The college houses an art room and science laboratory blocks. A photonics laboratory allows students to conduct research.

== Academic programmes ==
The college offers a two-year pre-university course leading to the Singapore-Cambridge GCE Advanced Level Examination. In accordance with the revised 'A' Level curriculum from 2006 as specified by the MOE, students could offer either three H2 and one H1 content-based subjects or four H2 subjects, in addition to General Paper, Mother Tongue (MT) and Project Work. Project Work is a compulsory subject at JC1 level. Students who scored a grade of at least D7 for Higher Mother Tongue at Ordinary level have the option of being exempted for MT at Advanced level, as they are considered to have fulfilled the H1 MT Language requirement.

The subject combinations offered at JJC are classified as 3 main types:

- Science
- Arts
- Language Elective Programme (either science or arts)

The school also conduct workshops as prescribed by the national curriculum.

=== Language Elective Programme ===
Jurong Junior College offers the Chinese Language Elective Programme (or 语特) since 2006.

Students are required to undertake H2 Chinese Language and Literature and a Chinese Language related subject to be eligible for the programme. As with other institutions offering the CLEP, students under the programme enjoys two bonus points in their admission to Jurong Junior College. Singaporean students are eligible for the two-year Chinese Language Elective Scholarship offered by the Ministry of Education.

== Notable alumni ==
- Eric Moo – Singer
- Pornsak – Host
- Pritam Singh – Politician, Leader of the Opposition, Member of Parliament for Aljunied GRC
- Desmond Tan – Actor
- Ang Hin Kee – Politician, Member of Parliament for Ang Mo Kio GRC
- Yaw Shin Leong – Former Member of Parliament for Hougang SMC
