= Png Eng Huat =

Singaporean politician and businessman

- 方荣发
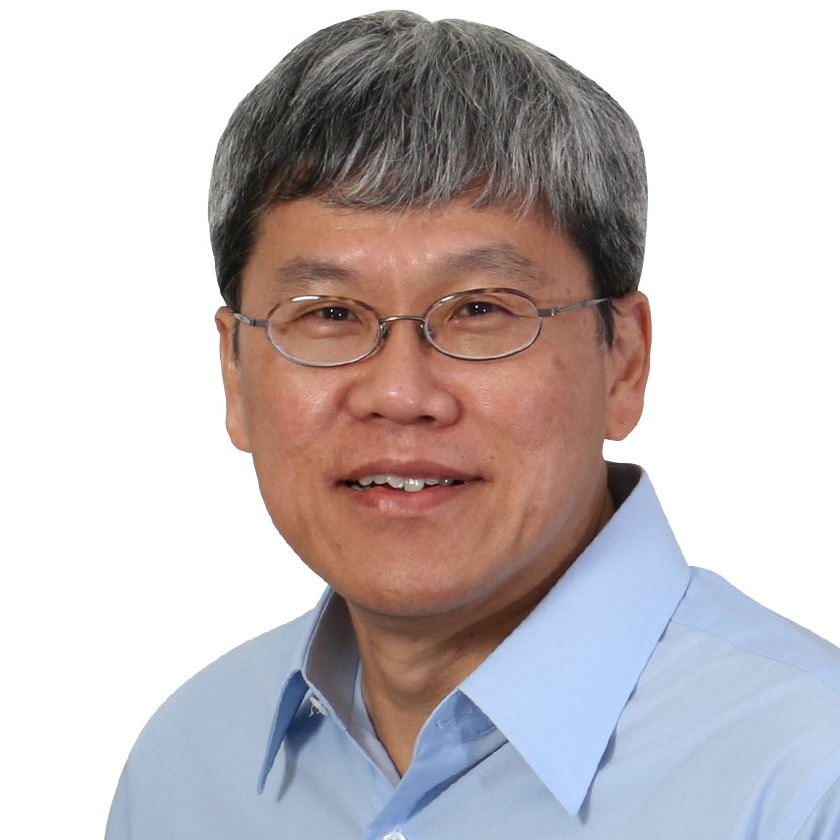
- Official portrait, 2015

Member of the Singapore Parliament for Hougang SMC
- In office 26 May 2012 – 23 June 2020
- Preceded by: Yaw Shin Leong
- Succeeded by: Dennis Tan
- Majority: 2012: 5,237 (24.16%); 2015: 3,462 (15.32%)

Personal details
- Born: 9 December 1961 (age 64) State of Singapore
- Party: Workers' Party
- Children: 2
- Education: University of Texas at Austin
- Occupation: Politician; Businessman

Png Eng Huat (Note: Chinese: 方荣发; pinyin: Fāng Róngfā) (born 9 December 1961) is a Singaporean politician and businessman. A member of the Workers' Party (WP), he was the Member of Parliament (MP) for Hougang Single Member Constituency (SMC) between 2012 and 2020.

== Early life and education ==
Png grew up living in the Tanjong Pagar area of Singapore. He was educated at Peck Seah Primary School and Raffles Institution, before going on to the Singapore Polytechnic, where he completed a Diploma in Electrical engineering in 1983. He then studied radio, television and film at the University of Texas at Austin in the United States, where he earned a Bachelor of Science degree in 1989.

== Career ==
After completing his university studies, Png worked for various organisations including Philips Singapore and NTUC Income, before setting up some of his own businesses.

=== Political career ===
Png joined the Workers' Party in 2006.

At the 2011 general election, Png stood in a five-member Workers' Party team in the East Coast GRC. The Party was defeated by the governing People's Action Party (PAP) by 49,429 votes (45.2%) to 59,992 (54.8%). This was third-highest percentage of the votes garnered by losing opposition candidates, which therefore entitled the Workers' Party to nominate a member of the team to become a Non-constituency Member of Parliament (the party nominated Png's teammate Gerald Giam).

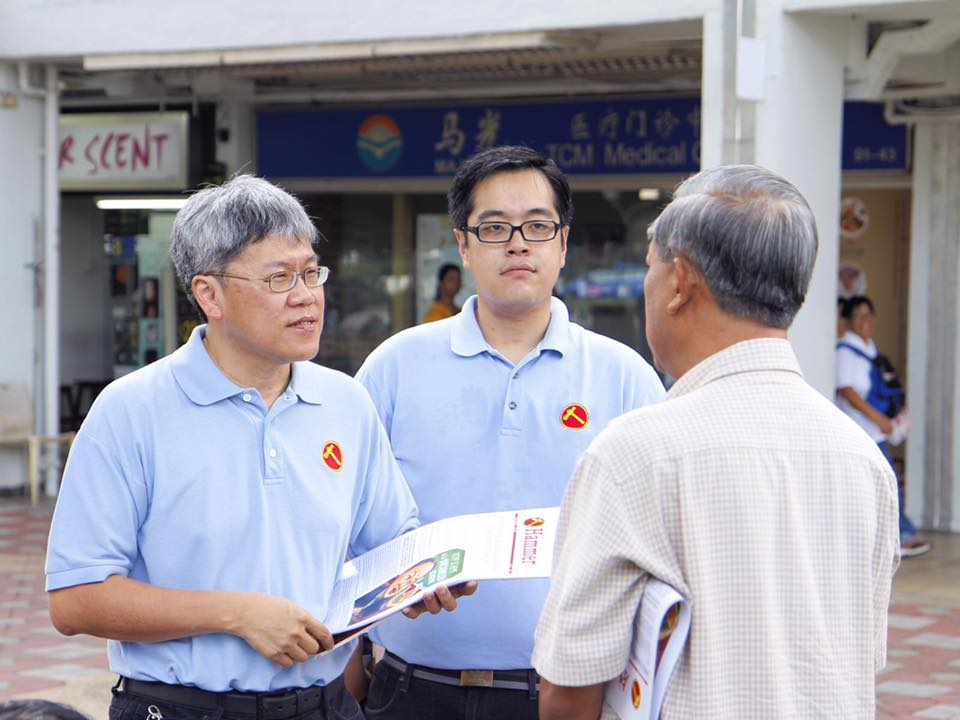
Png (left) on a walkabout

On 10 May 2012, the Workers' Party announced that Png would be the party's candidate in the 2012 Hougang by-election. His nomination was confirmed on 16 May. He was one of two candidates in the by-election, the other being Desmond Choo of the PAP. Png won the by-election by 13,460 votes (62.1%) to 8,223 (37.9%).

Following his election to Parliament, the Workers' Party appointed Png as a vice-chairman of the Aljunied–Hougang Town Council.

On 25 June 2020, it was announced that Png would not be contesting in the 2020 general election, but would still remain active in politics.

In 2020, Png was re-elected to the WP's central executive committee.

He has remained politically active despite retiring from Parliament prior to the 2020 general election.

== Personal life ==
Png is married and has one son and one daughter.

== See also ==
- List of Singapore opposition party MPs elected

== Notes ==
Parliament of Singapore
Preceded by Yaw Shin Leong	Member of Parliament for Hougang SMC; 2012–2020	Succeeded by Dennis Tan
