= 2012 Hougang by-election =

Parliamentary by-election in Singapore

- 26 May 2012
- Registered: 23,368
- Turnout: 21,978 (94.05%) ▼0.31%
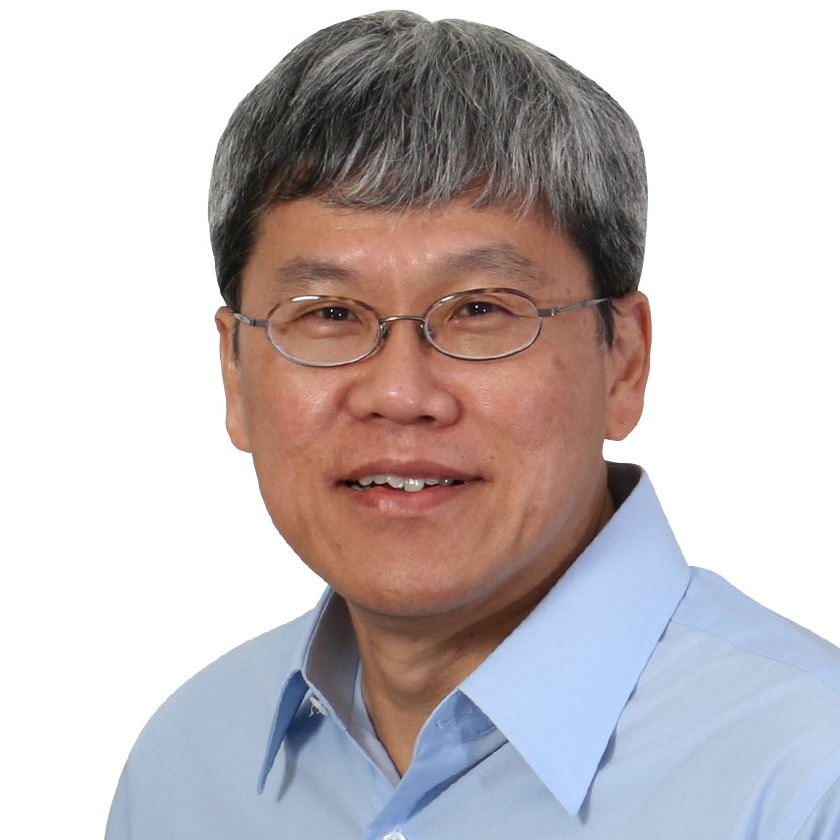

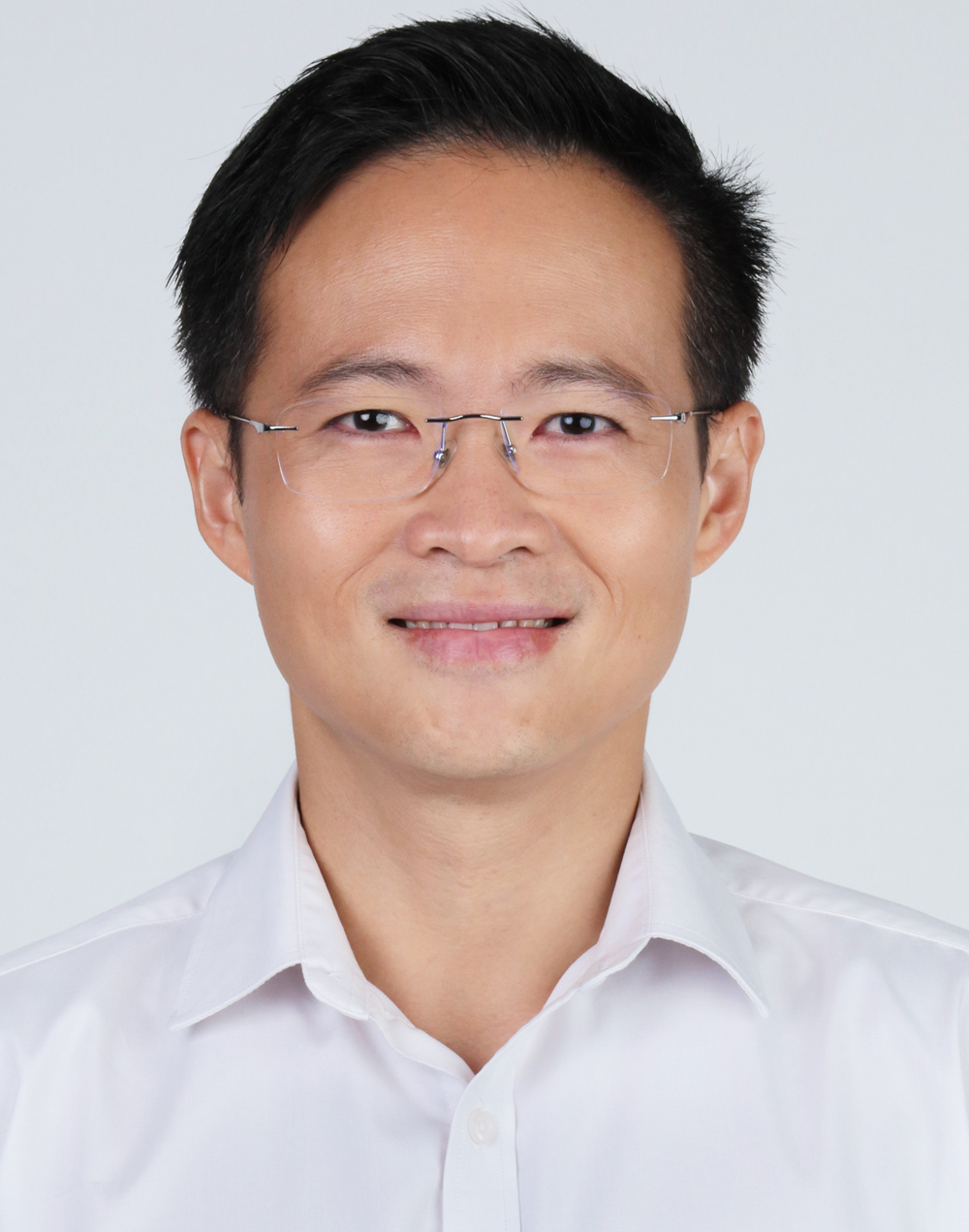
	First party	Second party
Candidate	Png Eng Huat	Desmond Choo
Party	WP	PAP
Popular vote	13,460	8,223
Percentage	62.08%	37.92%
Swing	▼2.72%	▲2.72%
MP before election
Yaw Shin Leong
WP
Elected MP
Png Eng Huat
WP

A parliamentary by-election was held in the Hougang Single Member Constituency (SMC) in Singapore on 26 May 2012. It was held to replace the vacant seat after incumbent Member of Parliament (MP) Yaw Shin Leong was expelled from the Workers' Party (WP) following revelations of his extramarital affairs. This marked the first by-election in almost two decades since 1992 at the Marine Parade Group Representation Constituency (GRC), and the first by-election of the 21st century.

On nomination day, the WP fielded former East Coast GRC candidate Png Eng Huat in hopes to retain their party's safe seat which had been held since 1991. The PAP fielded Desmond Choo, who is running again for that same seat as he did so in the 2011 election.

On polling day, WP Png's won the by-election with a score of 62.08% to retain Hougang SMC, and was sworn in to the Parliament on 9 July.

== Background ==
The seat of a Member of Parliament shall become vacant — [...] if he ceases to be a member of, or is expelled or resigns from, the political party for which he stood in the election;

— Constitution of Singapore, Article 46(2)(b)

Whenever the seat of a Member, not being a non-constituency Member, has become vacant for any reason other than a dissolution of Parliament, the vacancy shall be filled by election in the manner provided by or under any law relating to Parliamentary elections for the time being in force.

— Constitution of Singapore, Article 49

On 20 January 2012, Temasek Review Emeritus published a report containing speculation and rumours that Yaw Shin Leong, then-MP for Hougang SMC and the party's treasurer, had an alleged extramarital affair with a fellow party member. This led to WP launching an investigation and attempted to contact Yaw for clarification, but Yaw did not respond as he was uncontactable. On 7 February, Yaw resigned from his post from the party's Central Executive Committee. Yaw's actions, coupled with absences in regular CEC meetings and during the Meet-the-People Sessions, raised further suspicions from the CEC. Tabloids later revealed reports that Yaw had also been involved with five different women, including a tuition teacher from China, and Nee Soon GRC WP candidate Angela Oon, now a member of the Progress Singapore Party. Yaw was briefly present during the Chinese New Year dinner for Hougang SMC before becoming uncontactable again.

A week after Yaw's resignation from the CEC, WP held a press conference to formally announce his expulsion, then apologized to the Hougang voters for the inconvenience caused and allow this by-election to occur. Party chairwoman Sylvia Lim told on media that Yaw had been accused on several indiscretions in his personal life and failed to account for his actions to the party despite repeated reminders, and noted that their removal was meant for "public interest". Party chief Low Thia Khiang, also the preceding MP for Hougang, told in Chinese that the party have condemned Yaw's misconduct and the breach of the party directives, citing "irresponsible behaviour". Low added that the expulsion should not undermine the public interest of both the electorate and the democracy itself. As a result of the expulsion, Yaw had the shortest tenure among the elected MPs in Singapore's history, lasting only nine months into the term. Within 30 minutes of 20:37, news reports detailed the mixed reactions among Hougang residents to Yaw's expulsion. Between the time of his removal and the by-election, WP announced that their Aljunied GRC team will act as interim MPs for Hougang.

The Clerk of the Parliament then gave Yaw a notice to appeal his expulsion until 24 February. Two days later, Yaw decided not to challenge the appeal, which confirmed his removal from the party and effectively vacated his seat from Hougang SMC. (Note: Under Article 46(2)(b) of the Constitution of the Republic of Singapore, sitting MPs who either removed or resigned from the political party would result in the loss of their MP seats.) (Note: Prior to Yaw's expulsion, the last time a MP had been removed from the party was Chiam See Tong, who was ousted from the Singapore Democratic Party in 1993. Chiam was later reinstated in December the same year after a ruling by the High Court, which allowed him to retain his Potong Pasir SMC seat.) Prime Minister Lee Hsien Loong commented that there is no fixed time within which a by-election must be called, and PAP Chairman Khaw Boon Wan's quote that Hougang voters have been misled by the WP. This subsequently led to a lawsuit being filed in April, but the lawsuit was dropped four months later; its appeal was subsequently filed thereafter, but was also dismissed in July 2013.

In the days following the announcement, dialogues between Low, former MP Ho Kah Leong and government press secretary Foo Kok Jwee, were mentioned in the letters columns of the Lianhe Zaobao and The Straits Times, generating mixed reactions of whether if WP had appropriately removed Yaw to preserve their party's integrity and democracy, and brought comparisons to the 1992 by-election, whether if the then four-member Marine Parade GRC team was intentional on doing so. Commentator Eugene Tan, assistant professor of law at the Singapore Management University School of Law, discussed how the Parliamentary Elections Act applied to the situation. Tan stated that although it was the President who issued the writ for election, it was the Prime Minister who advised on the matter, and that it was thus Lee who effectively controlled the election date. Tan argued that although the Constitution did not impose a timeframe within which a by-election had to be held, it was not the intent that this should allow elections to be postponed indefinitely. The fact that the Constitution is silent on exactly when by-elections should be called should not be taken as permission not to call them at all. "In short," he wrote, "the 'default' position should be that a by-election should be automatic, although there is no hard and fast rule on the timing." Tan also opined that WP should field as its candidate in the by-election someone not already in Parliament, rather than a Non-constituency MP. Tan argued that this state of affairs should not continue for the projected remaining term of the current Parliament of four and a half years. "[...] the cardinal principle of representation is crucial: A stand-in MP is not the same as an MP for whom the majority had voted. Not calling a by-election would undermine the importance of representation in our maturing parliamentary democracy", he wrote. Similarly, Secretary-General of the Singapore Democratic Party Chee Soon Juan stated that it was his party's "primary concern that Hougang remains in the hands of the opposition", declaring that it would therefore not field a candidate that would split the vote.

Three months later on 19 May, in the midst of the campaigning of the by-election, Yaw issued an apology to the Hougang electorate for the actions and sought privacy, and endorsed Png. Yaw and his wife Lau Wang Lin had since resided in overseas after his expulsion, beginning in Myanmar and then Beijing, China. Yaw died 11 years later on 10 November 2023.

=== Confirmation of by-election ===
On 9 May 2012, President Tony Tan issued a writ of election for the electoral division of Hougang. Nominations were held on 16 May at Serangoon Junior College, and polling took place on 26 May.

=== Hougang SMC ===

As of 9 May 2012, there were 23,368 registered voters, of which 43 were registered as overseas voters. They accounted for 51% of the total resident population of Hougang SMC. Approximately 80% of the resident population lived in public housing, and around 83% of the voters were Chinese. Hougang have nine polling stations across the constituency, and ballot boxes were sent to either one of the two counting centers, namely Serangoon Junior College and Holy Innocents' Primary School.

== Candidates ==
On 10 May 2012, each party announced their following candidates:

Candidates	Party	Background
Desmond Choo	People's Action Party	A member of the PAP, Choo, the nephew of former MP Choo Wee Khiang, was both an unionist and a civil servant, and was currently the branch secretary and grassroots advisor (Note: Another name for a "grassroots advisor", an individual appointed for "grassroots engagement and outreach" in a GRC division or SMC who, according to the People's Association (PA), has to be aligned with the "Government of the day". They do not need to be the elected MP for the area.) of Hougang. Choo earlier debuted in the last year's election, also contesting in Hougang.
Png Eng Huat	Workers' Party	A member of the WP, Png was a company director in an independent business company. Png earlier debuted in the last year's election, and he was part of the five-member WP team of East Coast GRC that narrowly lost to the PAP in said GRC, the narrowest winning margin by PAP among all GRCs in that election.

Two men had applied for political donation certificates but were not nominated as candidates:

Candidates	Background
Zeng Guoyuan	Zeng was a retired acupuncturist and former WP candidate. While Zeng had collected his certificate, he however withdraw from the nomination after being concerned that his prior conviction in 2008 (involving him scolding two police officers, and shifted his blame on his parrot) would render him ineligible. The Elections Department later confirmed that Zeng did not file his nomination papers.
Poh Lee Guan	Poh was a WP candidate who debut in the 2001 election contesting in the now-defunct Nee Soon East SMC and the Nee Soon GRC in the last election. Poh did collect his certificates but had breached their party directives as he did not consult the CEC prior on doing so. Poh was later condemned by the CEC two months after the by-election, resulting in his expulsion from the party.

== Campaigning ==
=== Summary of election rallies ===
On Nomination Day, 16 May, the Singapore Police Force issued a list of sites available for rallies ("electoral meetings"). They could be held from 16 May to 24 May between 7am to 10pm. It was also announced that the Speakers' Corner would not serve as an "unrestricted area" during the campaigning period. All rallies below were held between 7pm to 10pm.

Party	19 May	20 May	22 May	24 May
PAP	NA	Hougang Stadium (Note: The Hougang Stadium was under the boundaries of the neigbouring Ang Mo Kio GRC.)	NA	Hougang Stadium
WP	Hougang Stadium	NA	Hougang Stadium	Field near Block 837 in Hougang Central

=== PAP plans ===
In the morning of Nomination Day, he visited several coffee shops before heading to the bus interchange to greet residents leaving for work. Choo updated his social media and ran a campaign plan to keep the 'democracy and providing alternative voices' separate from the purpose of the by-election. Choo said to ask voters to vote for him because the democracy level is already good enough due to the WP's current representation. He mentioned that he would champion the residents by creating a brighter future, advocating on creating more pre-schools and family-friendly places, and improving job conditions for low and middle-income workers, as an "independent". He paid many house visits during the election and revealed his manifesto and campaign slogan, "Always Here For You", to them to assure the wishes of voting for him to the "best interest".

Choo ran his own campaign without the presence of the PAP MPs despite being supported by them, and on behalf of the younger electorate for a change. Prime Minister Lee told that the slate in the Parliament would not change but assured voters to "think carefully"; these claims were rebuked by Low, telling that it is not an option for democracy and concerning that if WP lost Hougang, the ward may be dissolved in the next election akin to gerrymandering.

=== WP plans ===
Png led his campaign by calling Hougang a 'bastion of unwavering courage' and asked to affirm the faith of continuing support for WP even after the by-election. He planned for advocacy in transport, education and wage issues, should he be elected. In the same interview, Low apologized to the residents for the cause of the by-election, but said he would also do his best to support Png for the by-election, adding that the saga has been cast aside. Png revealed that his job experience as businessman, and his daughter was about to take PSLE later this year, were inspired by his desire to support education causes and related matters. Png also announced plans to improve the Hougang town, despite not releasing his own manifesto or campaign slogan, but maintained their 2011 slogan "Towards a First World Parliament".

When questioned by the media on Poh Lee Guan's attempt to contest the by-election, WP addressed that the topic should be mentioned after the by-election concluded. Png also said that he has not been in contact with Poh since, and said he should focus more on campaigning rather than settling other matters that would distract him. Low said that he has not been made aware about Poh's intention to contest the by-election as he did not inform the party on doing so. WP issued a media statement prior to nomination day confirming about Poh not informing the party on his contest, and had his biodata removed from the WP's website.

Poh declined to comment on the criticisms levelled against him when contacted by The Straits Times, but when he was approached at the Nomination Centre in Serangoon Junior College, he told reporters all he wanted to do was to be the 'unofficial back-up' candidate in case if Png was not nominated, but denied claims that he did this as protest. This move was likely a reference to their WP's sudden disqualification of Aljunied GRC in the 2001 election. The Elections Department clarified that it had issued the names in response to media queries, but there were no similar queries tying to Poh, as they added.

Nearly two months after the by-election concluded, the CEC concluded their investigations and on 10 July, they expelled Poh from WP, citing unacceptable reasons.

=== Campaigning ===
Both candidates campaigned on low-profile as it was due to a by-election. Both campaigned hard over municipal issues and the democracy system.

On 19 May, several WP spoke at the first rally to emphasize the importance in debating national issues among the municipal issues and why they would ask to vote for Png for the purpose of democracy, which Low described as a "cradle of democracy", noted that Hougang was voted by the WP for 21 years. They also noted that the PAP's performance last year was a clear sign of dissatisfaction with the electorate, and brought concerns about transportation. Low also noted that removing Yaw from the WP was "political courage" and added the importance of responsibility, not just on who will be elected for Hougang, but also to uphold the code of conduct to not just serving residents but also to the party as well. Aljunied GRC MP Pritam Singh similarly spoke for the younger electorate about the past MPs that have resigned for the same reasons should take as a reminder, and that the reason that no MPs are immune from making mistakes. Png told that Hougang is “not for sale” as a reference to the PAP’s failed $100 million carrot and stick campaign for Hougang and Potong Pasir in 2006, and should Choo wins the by-election, Hougang may be redrawn into other wards as if the same where Cheng San and Eunos GRCs were redrawn after WP narrowly lost in their respective elections, and the dissolution of Anson because of political engineering, but told that they would continue to outreach residents regardless of results.

On 20 May, the PAP made its first rally questioning WP on why he let Gerald Giam took the Non-constituency Member of Parliament position instead of Png, and defended WP's claims on highlighting the results last year and pledges to do better. Deputy Prime Minister Teo Chee Hean said that Yaw had "wasted that chance" and wanted to show Choo that he is more suitable to take over to allow the generation to keep up, similar to voting for Yaw, who was of the same generation. PAP MP Denise Phua spoke that democracy is "being free to choose" and noted the PAP can speak "boldly and without fear". Former MP Peh Chin Hua also made an appearance to speak for them. The following day, an interview revealed Png's decision to pass the NCMP offer due to the nature of the scheme, and that clarified about the discussions by the East Coast GRC team.

That same day, PAP's Choo also concerned that a MP needs to apply pressure on the authorities to expedite certain national projects, such as the Lift Upgrading Programme, while commenting at Low's government welfare schemes; he however, refuted online claims that he would vote "in return for gifts". This claim surfaced by its Facebook page so-called "Temasek Review" on Monday morning before being taken down hours later, but both parties did not lodge a police report. Similarly, online sentiments between both parties had become much more common with criticisms.

WP took aim at PAP on their second rally on 22 May, and schematized PAP's claims. Lim, then-chairman of the Aljunied-Hougang Town Council, who addressed in the rally first, commented Png as a "guitarist", promoted the improvements on the AHTC, and pushed for better fairness and transparency regarding town improvements and welfare. The WP also pledged to include Png as a vice-chairman of AHTC alongside Low, if he wins. Giam highlighted the online sentiments and his blogging career, and refuted Phua's claims as "fundamental misunderstanding" in the parliamentary process. Chen Show Mao similarly noted on the differences between them and the choices that they make, such as how Chen faced a tough decision on choosing a party to join between PAP and WP and how he ended up choosing the latter. Low also clarified the NCMP and Png's decision of not taking up the NCMP, and differed the term of "ballot"; Low even showed a copy of the "ballot" in full view to the audience, but also addressed how Eric Tan always wanted to take up the NCMP but later left WP because he was not selected by the CEC. Png told about the determination as working in government is "not easy", and the requirement of its grassroots advisors, regardless of parties elected, and that PAP can become one appointed by the People's Association if he won, and that the PAP candidate won't have to work a dual role between a grassroots advisor and a MP.

A leaked memo about the CEC's meeting was surfaced by an anonymous source subtitled "Secret Squirrel", detailing the CEC's decision and the vote where Giam garnered seven votes, followed by Tan's five and Png's one. Speaking in another interview, Png still said that the word "ballot" refers to "a voting process" and not a "voting slip" and wishes to set aside that matter because he felt that "something which we all learn in politics... the words we use'", before apologizing to the media over a state of confusion. Low told to set aside "personal preferences" and acknowledged the leak, calling that move as a "sabotage". DPM Teo mentioned in a separate interview later evening that they must see the "beginning" on who they want to elect in Hougang, and questioned WP's honesty. Since the debate went viral, the terms "Png-gate" and "NCMP-gate" were coined.

On 24 May, both parties made their final rallies before the cooling-off day. On the PAP side, Choo addressed in his rally in four languages of English, Chinese, Malay and Teochew. He mentioned that he wants a clean fight amidst the issues raised, to believe in the MP that they will have after the by-election, and he believes that it is a "fresh start". On the WP side, Low arrived late at the site while Faisal Manap kicked off the rally. WP pushed the support for Png and insisted for better municipal issues over responses from the electorate, and stressed the importance on not to overlook the limitations of the opposition MPs. Png later revealed that he was actually of a Hokkien ethnicity instead of Teochew like Choo and Low, (Note: According to Png, his wife was however, of a Teochew ethnicity. Future Hougang SMC WP MP Dennis Tan was also of a Hokkien ethnicity but also being fluent in Teochew.) but advocated over the importance of dialects and why it is important for Hougang to have a MP with dialects, as how Low used Teochew to earn the support.

== Results ==
The results were announced at 10.30pm (SGT) where WP's Png retained Hougang SMC with 62.08% of the valid votes, beating PAP's Choo with 37.92%. The overseas vote count was tabulated four days later, adding each candidate another 13 votes (there is only one spoiled vote and 16 abstained from voting).

By-election 2012
Party	Candidate	Votes	%	±%
WP	Png Eng Huat	13,460	62.08	▼2.72
PAP	Desmond Choo	8,223	37.92	▲2.72
Majority		5,237	24.16	▼5.44
Total valid votes		21,683	98.66	▼0.21
Rejected ballots		295	1.34	▲0.21
Turnout		21,978	93.9	▼0.4
Registered electors		23,368		▼4.85
WP hold		Swing	▼2.72	

== See also ==
- Vellama d/o Marie Muthu v. Attorney-General
