= Eric Low =

Singaporean politician (1948–2023)

Eric Low Siak Meng (simplified Chinese: 刘锡明; traditional Chinese: 劉錫明; pinyin: Líu Xī Míng; 1948 – 3 January 2023) was a Singaporean politician and a general manager. Formerly a member of the People's Action Party (PAP), he decided not to contest for the 2011 general election.

== Political career ==
Goh Chok Tong was tasked with the "special assignment" of helping Low win Hougang Single Member Constituency in the 2006 general elections, along with Sitoh Yih Pin, the PAP candidate for Potong Pasir Single Member Constituency. Low and Sitoh were promised more latitude in the Parliament and freedom from being subjected to the party whip if he won Hougang Single Member Constituency.

He contested the Hougang Single Member Constituency in both the 2001 Singapore general election and the 2006 general election, losing both times to Low Thia Khiang from Workers' Party.

In 2011, Low announced that he would not contest Hougang SMC in the coming general election.

== Awards ==
Low was awarded the Pingat Bakti Masyarakat (Public Service Medal), Bintang Bakti Masyarakat (Public Service Star) and Bintang Bakti Masyarakat (Public Service Star) - Bar over the years.

== Death ==
Low died from natural causes on 3 January 2023 at the age of 74, he would have been 75 at that year.
