= Choa Chu Kang Park =

Community park in Choa Chu Kang, Singapore

Coordinates: 1.388497°N 103.746868°E

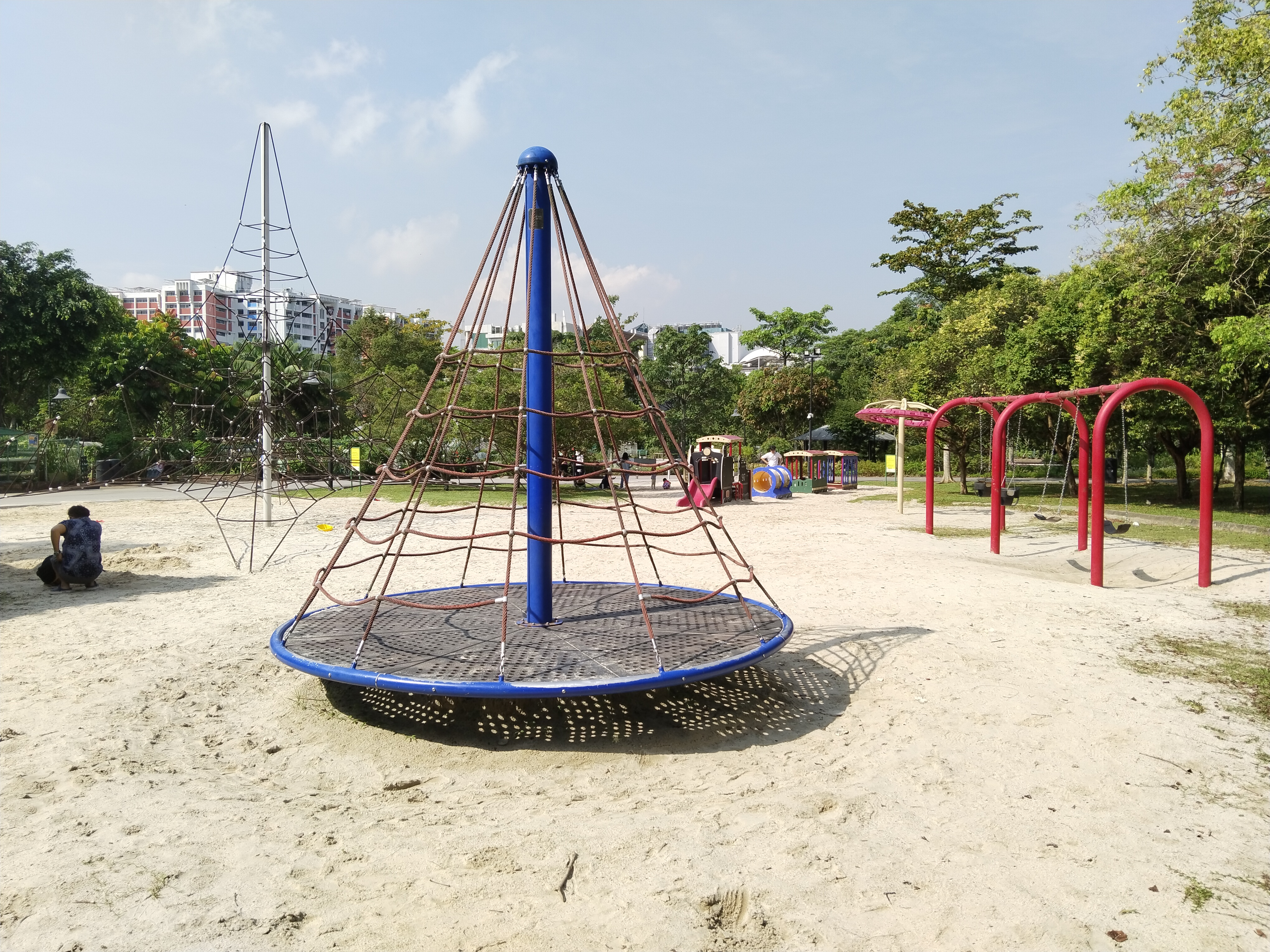
- Playground at Choa Chu Kang Park
- Interactive map of Choa Chu Kang Park
- Type: Community park
- Location: Choa Chu Kang, Singapore
- Established: 11 November 2000; 25 years ago
- Operator: National Parks Board
- Status: Open

Choa Chu Kang Park is a community park in Choa Chu Kang, Singapore, located beside Kranji Expressway and along Choa Chu Kang Drive.

== History ==
In 1996, plans for a park to be built near Choa Chu Kang Drive were revealed under the Choa Chu Kang Development Guide Plan.

Choa Chu Kang Park was opened on 11 November 2000, by Minister for National Development Mah Bow Tan.

On 29 March 2014, a community garden was added. The plans were announced by Minister of Health Gan Kim Yong.

On 7 July 2018, the fourth National Parks Board Therapeutic Garden was opened in Choa Chu Kang Park.

== See also ==
- List of parks in Singapore
