= Serangoon Stadium =

Stadium in Singapore

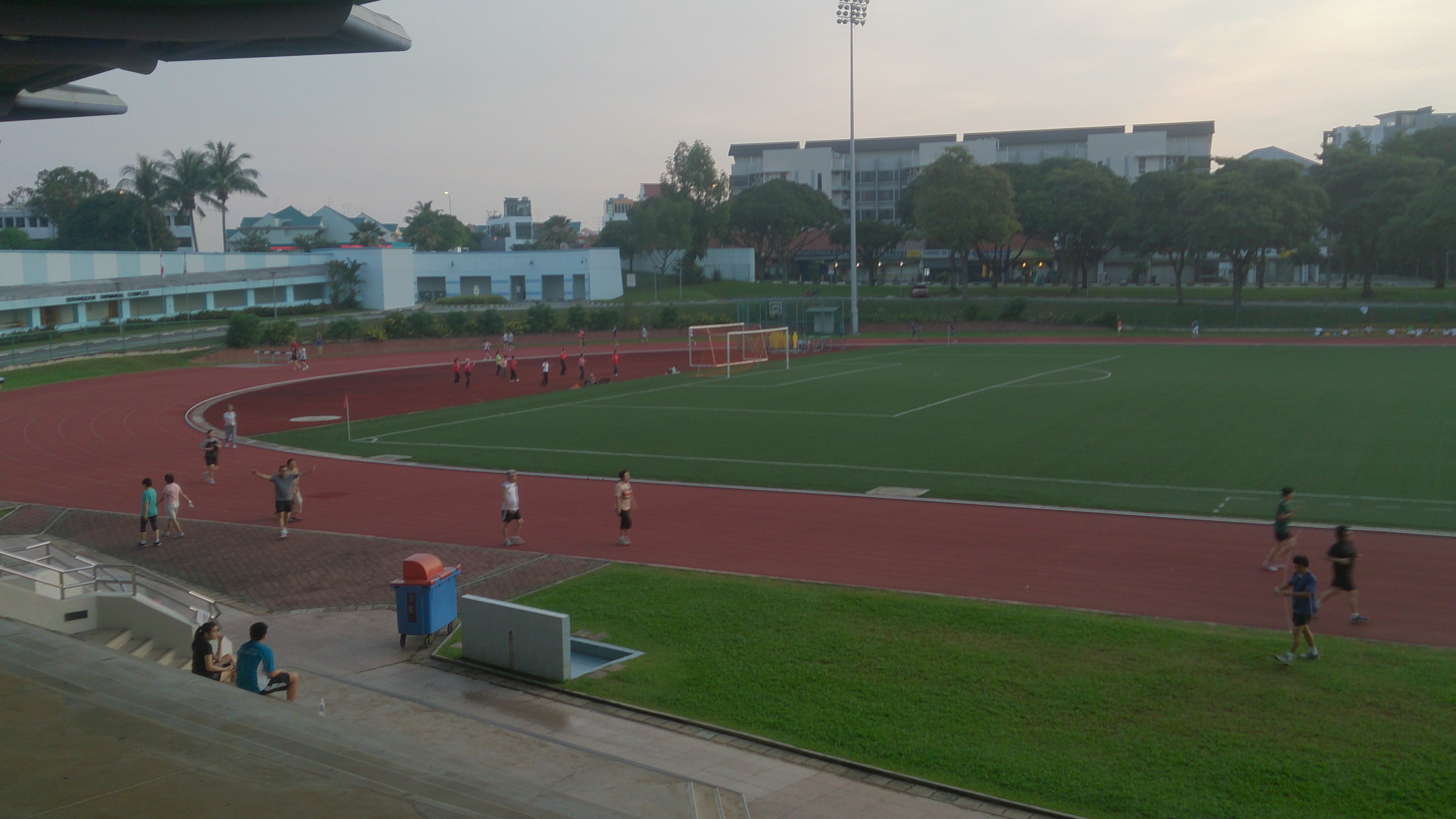
- Interactive map of Serangoon Stadium
- Address: 33 Yio Chu Kang Rd, Singapore 545677
- Location: Serangoon, Singapore
- Coordinates: 1°21′22.33″N 103°52′29.81″E
- Owner: Sport Singapore
- Operator: Sport Singapore
- Capacity: 1,200
- Surface: Grass
- Public transit: NE12 CC13 Serangoon

Construction
- Opened: 1 March 1994; 32 years ago

Serangoon Stadium is a multi-purpose stadium with a seating capacity of 1,200 in Serangoon, Singapore. It currently serves as one of several venues for the Football Association of Singapore's (FAS) Under 17 and Under 15 Youth League football matches.

The stadium is managed by Sport Singapore, and like most stadiums in Singapore, it is generally open to the public daily from 4.30am till 9.30pm, unless exclusively booked. Its facilities include a football field, an eight-lane running track, several athletic facilities, and a fitness corner.

It has also occasionally served as a venue for general election rallies and post election assemblies, including those organised by the Workers' Party (WP) and the ruling People's Action Party (PAP) as the stadium is located within the opposition-held Aljunied GRC.

== History ==
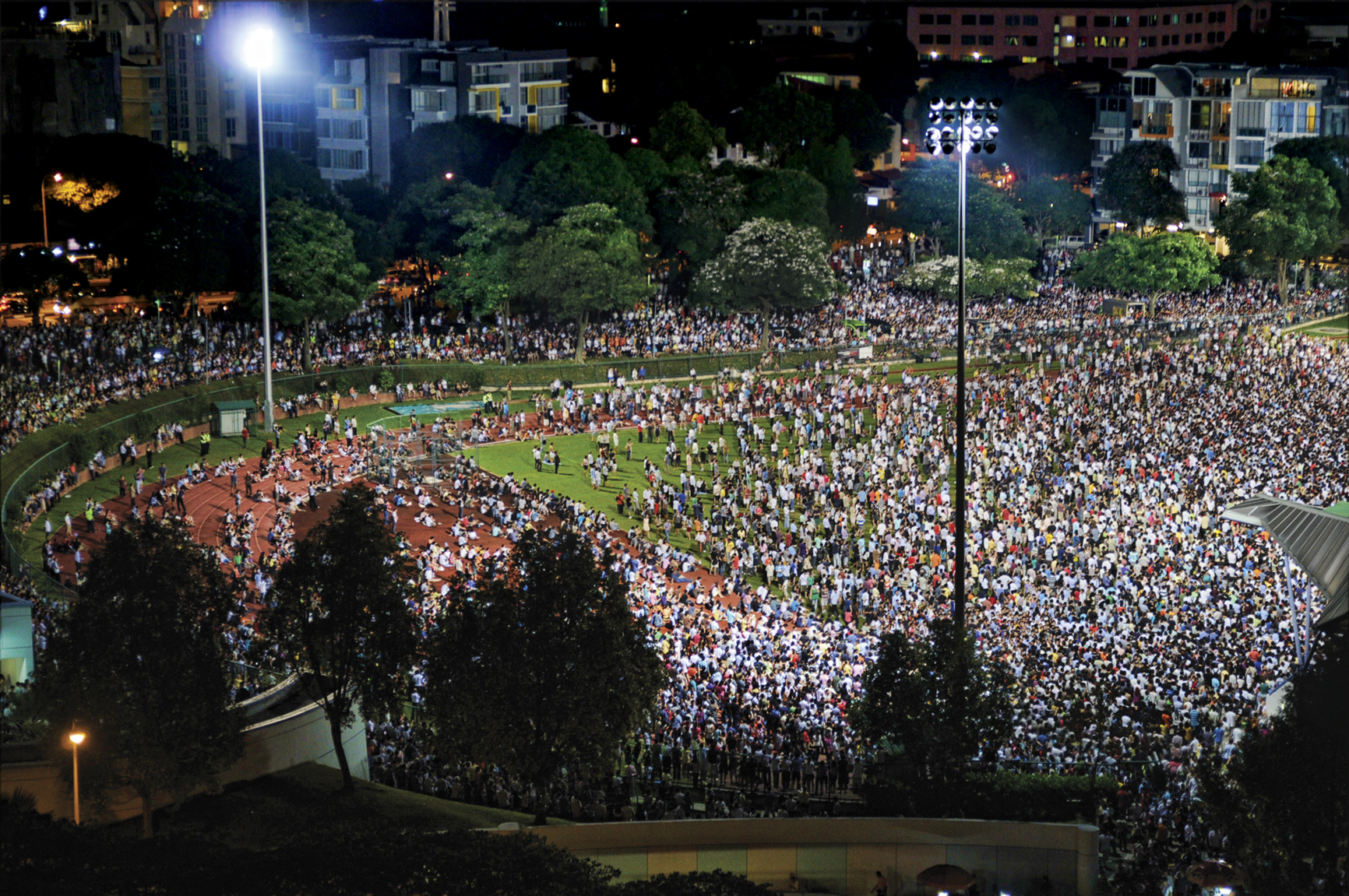
Workers' Party general election rally at Serangoon Stadium, 2011

Before the stadium was constructed, the surrounding area was home to a Teochew village known as Chia Keng, which was noted for its local car repair workshops and its proximity to the historic Lim Tua Tow wet market.

After the area was cleared for the development of Serangoon town, design works for Serangoon Sports Complex began in September 1987, with plans for a stadium and a swimming pool. The complex was subsequently built in 1993 and opened to the public on 1 March 1994.

In 2015, the Football Association of Singapore opened its third Grassroots Football Training Centre at the stadium.

In 2024, the Urban Redevelopment Authority (URA) proposed redeveloping Serangoon Sports Complex, including the stadium. The proposal envisage a wider range of community and sporting amenities, potentially including a gym, basketball courts and an accessible sheltered pool. The redevelopment is expected to be completed by 2030.

== See also ==
- List of stadiums in Singapore
