= Yaw Shin Leong =

Singaporean businessman (1976–2023)

- 饶欣龙
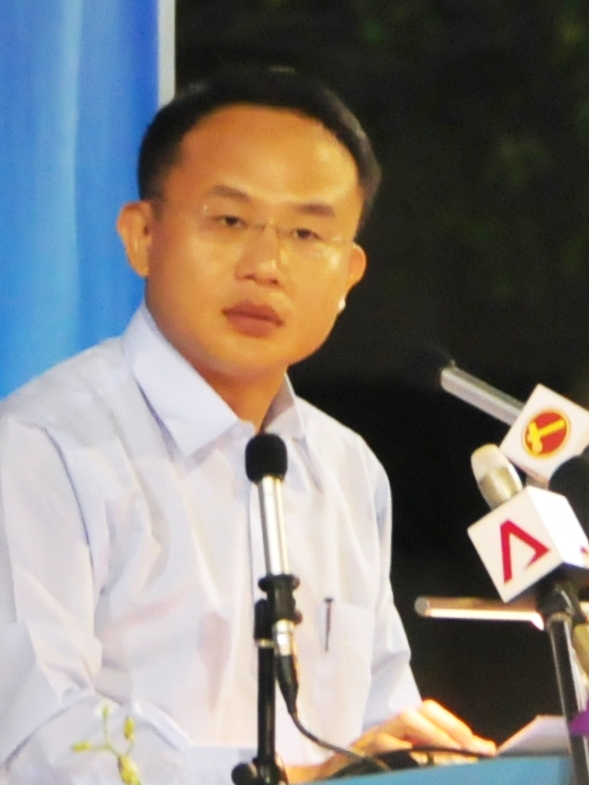
- Yaw during a rally speech in 2011

Member of the Singapore Parliament for Hougang SMC
- In office 7 May 2011 – 14 February 2012
- Preceded by: Low Thia Khiang
- Succeeded by: Png Eng Huat
- Majority: 6,780 (29.63%)

Personal details
- Born: 2 June 1976 Singapore
- Died: 10 November 2023 (aged 47) Beijing, People's Republic of China
- Other political affiliations: Workers' Party (2001–2012)
- Spouses: Ng Mei Sze (m. 2004–2005) Lau Wang Lin (m. 2008)
- Children: 2
- Education: MBA (University of Western Sydney), BA (National University of Singapore)
- Occupation: Businessman; Politician
- Aliases: Amos Rao

Yaw Shin Leong (Chinese: 饶欣龙; pinyin: Ráo Xīnlóng; 2 June 1976 – 10 November 2023) was a Singaporean businessman and politician. A former member of the Workers' Party (WP), he was the Member of Parliament for Hougang Single Member Constituency (SMC) between 2011 and 2012.

== Early life ==
Yaw's father died when he was 13. His widowed mother then scrimped and saved to bring up both his younger sister and himself, and support them through tertiary education.

Yaw served as a medic with the Singapore Armed Forces.

== Education ==
Yaw had his secondary and pre-university education in Bukit Panjang Government High School and Jurong Junior College. He held a Bachelor of Arts (BA, Merit) degree in Political Science & Sociology from National University of Singapore. He also held a Master of Business Administration (MBA) from University of Western Sydney.

== Career ==
Yaw joined the WP in June 2001 and joined the Central Executive Committee (CEC) at some point in time. He remained in the CEC until 7 February 2012, when he suddenly resigned from the post of Treasurer.

In the 2006 general election, Yaw led the WP team contesting Ang Mo Kio Group Representation Constituency (GRC), which was anchored by then-Prime Minister Lee Hsien Loong. Made up largely of young, first-time candidates under the age of 35, the team was dubbed the "suicide squad" by the media, and then-chair of the governing People's Action Party (PAP), Lim Boon Heng, predicted that the PAP team would win 80 to 85% of the votes, putting the WP at risk of losing their Ang Mo Kio deposit. However, Yaw's team managed to secure more than one-third of the votes.

In December 2010, Yaw published a Chinese book 'Towards Political Vibrancy & Development' (迈向政治发展与繁荣), a translation of selected English blog posts by him which included reflections on his approximately 10 years of political participation.

Yaw became the WP candidate for Hougang SMC during the 2011 general election after the previous MP, party leader Low Thia Khiang, opted to vacate it after 20 years to lead a five-member WP team in Aljunied GRC. Low personally endorsed Yaw for the SMC.

On 7 May 2011, Yaw retained Hougang SMC with 64.8% of the vote, compared to the 35.2% for Desmond Choo from the PAP. His margin of victory was the highest-ever achieved by the Workers' Party since it first won the constituency in 1991. Yaw, along with fellow MPs Chia Shi-Lu and Ong Teng Koon, was invited to join the Advisory Council on Community Relations in Defence (Accord). He accepted the invitation.

=== Appointments under WP ===
- Member (Jun 2001 – Feb 2012)
- Legislative Assistant (LA), Low Thia Khiang's MP Office (2001–2005)
- Town Councillor, Hougang Town Council (HGTC) (2001–2005)
- Secretary, Hougang Constituency Committee (HGCC) (2001–2005)
- Secretary, GRC Area Committee (2003–2005)
- Secretary, Northern Area Committee (NAC) (2005–2006)
- Co-Secretary, Eastern Area Committee (EAC) (2005–2006)
- Deputy Organising Secretary, CEC (2002–2005)
- Chairman, Youth Action Committee (YAC) (2001–2005)
- Exco Member, WP Youth Wing (WPYW) (2005–2006)
- Webmaster (2001–2004)
- Organising Secretary, CEC (2006 – 6 June 2011)
- Chairman, Central Area Committee (CAC) (2006–2011)
- Treasurer, CEC (7 June 2011 – 7 February 2012)
- Chairman, HGCC (2011–2012)
- Vice-chairman, Aljunied–Hougang Town Council (AHTC) (2011–2012)
- Vice-chairman, Hougang Constituency Education Trust (HCET) (2011–2012)

=== Expulsion from party ===
In January 2012, news of a rumoured extramarital affair with a fellow member of the Workers' Party broke out. Yaw said he did not intend to respond to the rumours. A married Chinese woman also claimed to have had an affair with Yaw.

After Yaw's resignation of his treasurer post, netizens queried and speculated on the reason for his resignation.

On 15 February 2012, the WP announced that Yaw had been expelled with immediate effect, citing "several indiscretions in his private life" as grounds for expulsion. The CEC invited Yaw to explain himself several times, but he failed to attend the meetings. He was admonished for "[breaking] the faith, trust and expectations of the Party and People".

On 22 February 2012, Yaw emailed the then-Speaker of Parliament, Michael Palmer, to say that he would not be contesting his expulsion. As a result, his seat was deemed vacant from the date of his expulsion on 14 February 2012.

Yaw resided in Myanmar from late 2016 after he was expelled by the Workers' Party.

=== Career outside of politics ===
Yaw founded and managed an enrichment programme development firm, Eduhearts Consultancy from 2005 to 2012.

After the end of his political career, Yaw, under the alias Amos Rao, went to Myanmar to work as a senior vice-president at Shenton Co, a private education training institute, and the general manager of three subsidiaries there, including Temasek International College, which awarded degrees and diplomas in international business and hospitality.

== Personal life ==
Yaw's first marriage in 2004 was to Ng Mei Sze, however, it only lasted for approximately one year. In 2006, he met Lau Wang Lin, and they married in November 2008.

== Death ==
Yaw died on 10 November 2023 when he collapsed while having his morning jog in Beijing.

Parliament of Singapore
Preceded by Low Thia Khiang	Member of Parliament for Hougang; 2011–2012	Succeeded by Png Eng Huat
