= Hougang Single Member Constituency =

Electoral division in Singapore

Coordinates: 1°22′18.4″N 103°53′35″E

Hougang
- Single-member constituency for the Parliament of Singapore
- Region: North-East Region, Singapore
- Electorate: 29,464

Current constituency
- Created: 1988; 38 years ago
- Seats: 1
- Party: Workers' Party
- Member: Dennis Tan
- Town Council: Aljunied–Hougang
- Created from: Punggol SMC

The Hougang Single Member Constituency (Note: Malay: Kawasan Undi Perseorangan Hougang; Chinese: 后港单选区; Tamil: ஹவ்காங் தனித்தொகுதி) is a single-member constituency (SMC) situated in north-eastern Singapore. It is managed by Aljunied–Hougang Town Council (AHTC). The current Member of Parliament (MP) for the constituency is Dennis Tan from the Workers' Party (WP).

== History ==
=== 1988: Establishment ===
Hougang SMC was established prior to the 1988 general election and was initially won by the governing People's Action Party (PAP).

=== 1991: Swing to WP ===
However, the PAP only held the constituency for three years, as they lost it to WP candidate Low Thia Khiang in the 1991 general election, suffering a swing of nearly 12%. Low would retain the seat in every subsequent general election until 2011. In Low's interview about the Hougang in 2024, Low originally planned to contest Changi SMC due to his familiarity in that SMC, but decided to give it to then-chairman Tan Bin Seng instead as Tan stayed nearer to Changi; Low eventually chose Hougang SMC, also due to his familiarity.

=== 1997–2011: Low in his safe seat ===
Between 1997 and 2011, Low was one of only two directly elected opposition MPs; the other was Chiam See Tong, MP for Potong Pasir SMC. During the 2006 general election, Senior Minister Goh Chok Tong campaigned to help the PAP reclaim the two opposition constituencies, offering a S$100 million upgrading plan to Hougang SMC. Despite this, Low increased his vote share to 62.74%.

=== 2011–2020: First handover and by-election ===
In the 2011 general election, Low left Hougang SMC to contest (and eventually elect himself in) the adjacent Aljunied Group Representation Constituency (GRC), and gave his seat to Yaw Shin Leong, who previously contested Ang Mo Kio GRC. Yaw successfully retained Hougang SMC against debutant Desmond Choo, a future Tampines Changkat SMC MP, with 64.80% of the votes, the highest score attained by the WP and the second highest among all opposition candidates (Chiam's score for Potong Pasir SMC in 1991 was 69.64%). As of 2025, these scores remained unbeaten.

Nine months later, after Yaw had been in misconduct and failing to assume responsibility for accounting "indiscretions in his private life" when news of his alleged affair surfaced in early 2012, the WP announced his former expulsion in February and effectively vacating his Hougang SMC seat, resulting in Yaw having its short-lived MP tenure. A by-election was held three months later where former East Coast GRC candidate Png Eng Huat winning the seat against Choo but with a decreased 62.08% vote. Png was re-elected in the 2015 general election with a decreased 57.66% of the vote against PAP candidate Lee Hong Chuang, a future MP for Jurong East-Bukit Batok GRC. With the result, Hougang SMC surpassed Potong Pasir SMC's tenure for being the longest-held opposition safe seat in post-independence, which was achieved in 2017.

=== 2020–present: Second handover ===
Png retired before the 2020 general election; WP candidate Dennis Tan, also a Non-constituency Member of Parliament in the last election, retained Hougang SMC with 61.21% of the vote against Lee.

On 17 October 2023, the PAP appointed Jackson Lam (a Nee Soon GRC MP) as branch chairperson for the constituency, replacing Lee. Lam was himself replaced by Marshall Lim in February 2025. At the 2025 general election, Tan won reelection against Lim with an increased vote share of 62.15%, despite a nationwide swing towards the PAP.

== Member of Parliament ==
Interactive map of Hougang SMC as of the 2025 general election

Year	Member	Party
Formation
1988	Tang Guan Seng	PAP
1991	Low Thia Khiang	WP
1997	Low Thia Khiang	WP
2001	Low Thia Khiang	WP
2006	Low Thia Khiang	WP
2011	Yaw Shin Leong	WP
2012	Png Eng Huat	WP
2015	Png Eng Huat	WP
2020	Dennis Tan	WP
2025	Dennis Tan	WP

== Electoral results ==
Note: The Elections Department does not include rejected votes when calculating the vote shares of candidates. Hence, all candidates' vote shares will total to 100% at any given election (may not appear so in multi-way contests due to rounding).

=== Elections in 1980s ===
General Election 1988
Party	Candidate	Votes	%
PAP	Tang Guan Seng	11,983	58.96
WP	Lim Chiu Liang	8,342	41.04
Majority		3,641	17.92
Total valid votes		20,325	97.37
Rejected ballots		548	2.63
Turnout		20,873	96.18
Registered electors		21,703	
PAP win (new seat)			

=== Elections in 1990s ===
General Election 1991
Party	Candidate	Votes	%	±%
WP	Low Thia Khiang	10,621	52.82	▲11.78
PAP	Tang Guan Seng	9,487	47.18	▼11.78
Majority		1,134	5.67	▼12.25
Total valid votes		20,108	97.77	▲0.40
Rejected ballots		458	2.23	▼0.40
Turnout		20,566	95.76	▼0.42
Registered electors		21,476		▼1.05
WP gain from PAP		Swing	▲11.78	

General Election 1997
Party	Candidate	Votes	%	±%
WP	Low Thia Khiang	13,458	58.02	▲5.20
PAP	Heng Chee How	9,736	41.98	▼5.20
Majority		3,722	16.04	▲10.37
Total valid votes		23,194	98.68	▲0.91
Rejected ballots		311	1.32	▼0.91
Turnout		23,505	96.24	▲0.48
Registered electors		24,423		▲13.72
WP hold		Swing	▲5.20	

=== Elections in 2000s ===
General Election 2001
Party	Candidate	Votes	%	±%
WP	Low Thia Khiang	12,070	54.98	▼3.04
PAP	Eric Low	9,882	45.02	▲3.04
Majority		2,188	9.96	▼6.08
Total valid votes		21,952	98.67	▼0.01
Rejected ballots		295	1.33	▲0.01
Turnout		22,247	95.4	▼0.84
Registered electors		23,320		▼4.52
WP hold		Swing	▼3.04	

General Election 2006
Party	Candidate	Votes	%	±%
WP	Low Thia Khiang	13,989	62.74	▲7.76
PAP	Eric Low	8,308	37.26	▼7.76
Majority		5,681	25.48	▲15.52
Total valid votes		22,297	98.77	▲0.10
Rejected ballots		277	1.23	▼0.10
Turnout		22,574	95.01	▼0.39
Registered electors		23,759		▲1.88
WP hold		Swing	▲7.76	

=== Elections in 2010s ===
General Election 2011
Party	Candidate	Votes	%	±%
WP	Yaw Shin Leong	14,850	64.80	▲2.06
PAP	Desmond Choo	8,065	35.20	▼2.06
Majority		6,785	29.6	▲4.12
Total valid votes		22,915	98.87	▲0.10
Rejected ballots		261	1.13	▼0.10
Turnout		23,176	94.36	▼0.65
Registered electors		24,560		▲3.37
WP hold		Swing	▲2.06	

By-election 2012
Party	Candidate	Votes	%	±%
WP	Png Eng Huat	13,460	62.08	▼2.72
PAP	Desmond Choo	8,223	37.92	▲2.72
Majority		5,237	24.16	▼5.44
Total valid votes		21,683	98.66	▼0.21
Rejected ballots		295	1.34	▲0.21
Turnout		21,978	93.9	▼0.4
Registered electors		23,368		▼4.85
WP hold		Swing	▼2.72	

General Election 2015
Party	Candidate	Votes	%	±%
WP	Png Eng Huat	13,027	57.66	▼4.42
PAP	Lee Hong Chuang	9,565	42.34	▲4.42
Majority		3,462	15.32	▼8.84
Total valid votes		22,592	98.96	▲0.3
Rejected ballots		236	1.04	▼0.3
Turnout		22,828	94.73	▲0.83
Registered electors		24,097		▲3.12
WP hold		Swing	▼4.42	

=== Elections in 2020s ===
General Election 2020
Party	Candidate	Votes	%	±%
WP	Dennis Tan	15,451	61.21	▲3.55
PAP	Lee Hong Chuang	9,791	38.79	▼3.55
Majority		5,660	22.42	▲7.04
Total valid votes		25,242	98.93	▼0.03
Rejected ballots		272	1.07	▲0.03
Turnout		25,514	96.53	▲1.95
Registered electors		26,432		▲9.69
WP hold		Swing	▲3.55	

General Election 2025
Party	Candidate	Votes	%	±%
WP	Dennis Tan	16,956	62.15	▲0.94
PAP	Marshall Lim	10,327	37.85	▼0.94
Majority		6,629	24.30	▲1.88
Total valid votes		27,283	98.93	Steady
Rejected ballots		296	1.07	Steady
Turnout		27,579	93.60	▼2.93
Registered electors		29,464		▲11.47
WP hold		Swing	▲0.94	
