= 2016 DPMM FC season =

16th season in existence of DPMM FC

DPMM FC
2016 season
- Chairman: HRH Prince Al-Muhtadee Billah
- Head coach: Steve Kean
- Stadium: Hassanal Bolkiah National Stadium
- S.League: 3rd
- Singapore Cup: Quarter-finals
- League Cup: Runners-up
- Top goalscorer: League: (Brazil) Rafael Ramazotti (20); All: (Brazil) Rafael Ramazotti (25)

The 2016 season was DPMM FC's 5th consecutive season in the top flight of Singapore football, the S.League. They were the defending champions after a victorious 2015 campaign. The club also competed in the Singapore Cup and the Singapore League Cup.

This was Steve Kean's third season as head coach of the club. In this particular season, he advised players like Helmi Zambin, Yura Indera Putera Yunos and Najib Tarif to adapt to new playing positions in order to gain more minutes. Changes to the S.League in regards to foreign players' quota meant that the club had to release Boris Raspudic and Joe Gamble.

== Summary ==
DPMM began their season contesting the 2016 Singapore Community Shield against 2015 Singapore Cup winners Albirex Niigata (S) on 13 February which finished 3–2 to the Japanese satellite club.

In April, long-serving stalwart Sairol Sahari suffered an anterior crucial ligament injury that ultimately ended his DPMM career.

At the 2016 Singapore Cup, DPMM were drawn at the quarter-final stage with Ceres–La Salle FC who beat them 5–3 on aggregate on 3 July.

At the 2016 Singapore League Cup in July, DPMM reached the final of the competition against Albirex where they were beaten 0–2 at Jalan Besar Stadium.

DPMM ended their campaign in third place, behind Albirex and Tampines Rovers.

== Squad ==
No.	Name	Nationality	Date of birth (age)	Previous club	Contract start	Contract end
Goalkeepers
1	Azman Ilham Noor	(Brunei)	17 February 1984 (age 42)	(Brunei) NBT FC	2009	2016
24	Abdul Hafiz Abdul Rahim	(Brunei)	6 November 1996 (age 29)	Youth	2016	2016
25	Wardun Yussof	(Brunei)	14 September 1981 (age 45)	(Brunei) Majra FC	2006	2016
Defenders
2	Reduan Petara	(Brunei)	25 May 1988 (age 38)	(Brunei) Indera SC	2015	2016
3	Abdul Mu'iz Sisa	(Brunei)	20 April 1991 (age 35)	(Brunei) Indera SC	2016	2016
4	Fakharrazi Hassan	(Brunei)	15 July 1989 (age 37)	(Brunei) MS ABDB	2011	2016
5	Brian McLean	(Northern Ireland)	28 February 1985 (age 41)	(Scotland) Ross County	2015	2016
14	Helmi Zambin	(Brunei)	30 March 1987 (age 39)	(Brunei) Indera SC	2009	2016
18	Aminuddin Zakwan Tahir	(Brunei)	24 October 1994 (age 31)	(Brunei) Najip FC	2015	2016
21	Abdul Aziz Tamit	(Brunei)	7 September 1989 (age 37)	Youth	2009	2016
23	Yura Indera Putera Yunos	(Brunei)	25 March 1996 (age 30)	(Brunei) Majra FC	2015	2016
Midfielders
6	Azwan Saleh	(Brunei)	1 June 1988 (age 38)	(Brunei) Indera SC	2006	2016
7	Azwan Ali Rahman	(Brunei)	11 January 1992 (age 34)	(Brunei) Indera SC	2013	2016
8	Paulo Sérgio	(Portugal)	24 January 1984 (age 42)	(Portugal) Olhanense	2015	2016
9	Hendra Azam Idris	(Brunei)	10 August 1988 (age 38)	(Brunei) QAF FC	2012	2016
10	Nurikhwan Othman	(Brunei)	15 January 1993 (age 33)	(Brunei) Indera SC	2016	2016
11	Najib Tarif	(Brunei)	5 February 1988 (age 38)	(Brunei) Indera SC	2012	2016
12	Maududi Hilmi Kasmi	(Brunei)	5 February 1989 (age 37)	(Brunei) Najip FC	2015	2016
13	Rosmin Kamis	(Brunei)	17 June 1981 (age 45)	(Brunei) MS ABDB	2012	2016
15	Azim Izamuddin Suhaimi	(Brunei)	20 May 1997 (age 29)	Youth	2016	2016
16	Khairul Anwar Abdul Rahim	(Brunei)	16 September 1992 (age 34)	(Brunei) Indera SC	2015	2016
17	Na'im Tarif	(Brunei)	1 November 1996 (age 29)	Youth	2016	2016
Strikers
19	Rafael Ramazotti	(Brazil)	9 August 1988 (age 38)	(Japan) Gainare Tottori	2015	2016
20	Adi Said	(Brunei)	15 October 1990 (age 35)	(Brunei) Majra FC	2012	2016
22	Shah Razen Said	(Brunei)	14 December 1985 (age 40)	(Brunei) AH United	2005	2016
Players who left during season
3	Sairol Sahari	(Brunei)	9 April 1983 (age 43)	(Brunei) NBT FC	2006	2016

== Coaching staff ==
- Head Coach: Steve Kean
- Assistant Coach: Moksen Mohammad
- Goalkeeping Coach: Zainol Ariffin Juma'at

== Transfers ==
=== Arrivals ===
Pre-Season transfers

Position	Player	Transferred from	Ref
GK	(Brunei) Abdul Hafiz Abdul Rahim	Promoted from youth team	
MF	(Brunei) Na'im Tarif	Promoted from youth team	
MF	(Brunei) Azim Izamuddin Suhaimi	Promoted from youth team	
MF	(Brunei) Nurikhwan Othman	(Brunei) Indera SC	

Mid-season transfer

Position	Player	Transferred from	Ref
DF	(Brunei) Abdul Mu'iz Sisa	(Brunei) Indera SC	

=== Departures ===
Pre-Season transfers

Position	Player	Transferred To	Ref
GK	(Brunei) Suhandi Mahali	(Brunei) MS ABDB	
DF	(Brunei) Amalul Said	(Brunei) Kota Ranger	
DF	(Bosnia and Herzegovina) Boris Raspudić	(Bosnia and Herzegovina) Borac Banja Luka	
MF	(Republic of Ireland) Joe Gamble	Retired	

Mid-season transfer

Position	Player	Transferred To	Ref
DF	(Brunei) Sairol Sahari	(Brunei) Kasuka FC	

== Team statistics ==
=== Appearances and goals ===
No.	Pos.	Player	League		Singapore Cup		League Cup		Total	
No.	Pos.	Player	Apps.	Goals	Apps.	Goals	Apps.	Goals	Apps.	Goals
1	GK	(Brunei) Azman Ilham Noor	0	0	0	0	0	0	0	0
2	DF	(Brunei) Reduan Petara	2+1	0	0	0	0	0	3	0
3	DF	(Brunei) Abdul Mu'iz Sisa	1	0	0	0	0	0	1	0
4	DF	(Brunei) Fakharrazi Hassan	1+4	0	0	0	1	0	6	0
5	DF	(Northern Ireland) Brian McLean	22	3	2	1	5	0	29	4
6	MF	(Brunei) Azwan Saleh	24	1	2	0	4	0	30	1
7	MF	(Brunei) Azwan Ali Rahman	21+2	8	2	0	1+1	0	27	8
8	MF	(Portugal) Paulo Sérgio	19	6	1	0	3	2	23	8
9	FW	(Brunei) Hendra Azam Idris	8+5	0	0+1	0	1+3	0	18	0
10	MF	(Brunei) Nur Ikhwan Othman	1+6	0	1	0	0	0	8	0
11	MF	(Brunei) Najib Tarif	14+4	0	2	0	5	0	25	0
12	MF	(Brunei) Maududi Hilmi Kasmi	19+4	3	2	0	5	0	20	3
13	MF	(Brunei) Rosmin Kamis (captain)	22	0	2	0	4	0	28	0
14	DF	(Brunei) Helmi Zambin	17+2	0	2	0	5	0	26	0
15	MF	(Brunei) Azim Izamuddin Suhaimi	0+2	0	0+1	0	0+2	0	5	0
16	MF	(Brunei) Khairul Anwar Abdul Rahim	0+3	0	0	0	0	0	3	0
17	MF	(Brunei) Na'im Tarif	0	0	0	0	0	0	0	0
18	DF	(Brunei) Aminuddin Zakwan Tahir	7+3	0	0	0	0	0	10	0
19	FW	(Brazil) Rafael Ramazotti	24	20	2	1	5	4	31	25
20	FW	(Brunei) Adi Said	2+4	0	0	0	5	2	11	2
21	DF	(Brunei) Abdul Aziz Tamit	4+2	0	0	0	0	0	6	0
22	FW	(Brunei) Shah Razen Said	3+15	2	0+2	1	0+4	0	24	3
23	DF	(Brunei) Yura Indera Putera Yunos	21+2	1	2	0	2	0	27	1
24	GK	(Brunei) Abdul Hafiz Abdul Rahim	0	0	0	0	0	0	0	0
25	GK	(Brunei) Wardun Yussof	24	0	2	0	5	0	31	0
Players who have played this season but had left the club or on loan to other club
3	DF	(Brunei) Sairol Sahari	8	0	0	0	0	0	8	0

== Competitions ==
=== Overview ===
Competition	Record							
Competition	P	W	D	L	GF	GA	GD	Win %
S.League	24	12	5	7	47	37	+10	50.00
Singapore Cup	2	1	0	1	3	5	−2	50.00
League Cup	5	4	0	1	9	3	+6	80.00
Total	31	17	5	9	59	45	+14	54.84

=== S.League ===
Win Draw Loss

13 February 2016 Round 1	(Japan) Albirex Niigata (S)	3 – 2	DPMM (Brunei)	Kallang, Singapore
19:45 UTC+8	Yamada 16'; Kamata 36'; Fujihara 59'	Report	Azwan A. 65'; Tanaka 90+2' (o.g.)	Stadium: Jalan Besar Stadium; Attendance: 2,481; Referee: Jansen Foo

20 February 2016 Round 2	(Singapore) Geylang International	1 – 1	DPMM (Brunei)	Bedok, Singapore
19:30 UTC+8	Sahil 76'	Report	Ramazotti 77'	Stadium: Bedok Stadium; Referee: Muhammad Taqi

27 February 2016 Round 3	(Brunei) DPMM	3 – 1	Warriors (Singapore)	Bandar Seri Begawan, Brunei
20:15 UTC+8	McLean 7'; Maududi 26'; Azwan S. 28'	Report	Béhé 47'	Stadium: Hassanal Bolkiah National Stadium; Referee: Sukhbir Singh

4 March 2016 Round 4	(Singapore) Hougang United	0 – 0	DPMM (Brunei)	Kallang, Singapore
19:45 UTC+8		Report		Stadium: Jalan Besar Stadium; Referee: Nathan Chan

11 March 2016 Round 5	(Brunei) DPMM	2 – 1	Home United (Singapore)	Bandar Seri Begawan, Brunei
20:15 UTC+8	Ramazotti 35' (pen.); Azwan A. 72'	Report	Begue 19'	Stadium: Hassanal Bolkiah National Stadium; Referee: W. Ravisanthiran

19 March 2016 Round 6	(Brunei) DPMM	1 – 2	Tampines Rovers (Singapore)	Bandar Seri Begawan, Brunei
20:15 UTC+8	Ramazotti 59'	Report	Mehmet 4'; Webb 15'	Stadium: Hassanal Bolkiah National Stadium; Referee: Farhad Mohammad

8 April 2016 Round 8	(Brunei) DPMM	4 – 1	Garena Young Lions (Singapore)	Bandar Seri Begawan, Brunei
20:15 UTC+8	Maududi 4'; Ramazotti 50', 82' (pen.); Ammirul 58' (o.g.)	Report	Fareez 45'	Stadium: Hassanal Bolkiah National Stadium; Referee: Nathan Chan

15 April 2016 Round 9	(Brunei) DPMM	3 – 1	Balestier Khalsa (Singapore)	Bandar Seri Begawan, Brunei
20:15 UTC+8	Ramazotti 32'; Azwan A. 36'; Shahrazen 74'	Report	Hazzuwan 66'	Stadium: Hassanal Bolkiah National Stadium; Referee: G. Letchman

22 April 2016 Round 10	(Brunei) DPMM	1 – 2	Albirex Niigata (S) (Japan)	Bandar Seri Begawan, Brunei
20:15 UTC+8	Azwan A. 57'	Report	Kawata 72', 87' (pen.)	Stadium: Hassanal Bolkiah National Stadium; Referee: Muhammad Taqi

30 April 2016 Round 11	(Brunei) DPMM	1 – 2	Geylang International (Singapore)	Bandar Seri Begawan, Brunei
20:15 UTC+8	Ramazotti 66' (pen.)	Report	Shawal 30'; Faritz 87'	Stadium: Hassanal Bolkiah National Stadium; Referee: Ahmad A'Qashah

5 May 2016 Round 12	(Singapore) Warriors	1 – 1	DPMM (Brunei)	Choa Chu Kang, Singapore
19:30 UTC+8	Suto 89'	Report	Sérgio 61'	Stadium: Choa Chu Kang Stadium; Referee: W. Ravisanthiran

14 May 2016 Round 13	(Brunei) DPMM	3 – 2	Hougang United (Singapore)	Bandar Seri Begawan, Brunei
20:15 UTC+8	Sérgio 10'; Azwan A. 26'; Shah Razen 82'	Report	Plazibat 55'; Kapláň 59'	Stadium: Hassanal Bolkiah National Stadium; Referee: Jansen Foo

19 May 2016 Round 14	(Singapore) Home United	5 – 0	DPMM (Brunei)	Bishan, Singapore
19:30 UTC+8	Azhar 10'; Faris 39'; Ilsø 71', 73'; Syahiran 85'	Report		Stadium: Bishan Stadium; Attendance: 1,900; Referee: Muhammad Taqi

11 June 2016 Round 15	(Singapore) Tampines Rovers	4 – 3	DPMM (Brunei)	Jurong West, Singapore
20:00 UTC+8	Fazrul 38'; Webb 45'; Mehmet 63'; Pennant 79'	Report	Hendra 43'; Ramazotti 57', 70'	Stadium: Jurong West Stadium; Referee: Muhammad Taqi

19 June 2016 Round 17	(Singapore) Garena Young Lions	1 – 1	DPMM (Brunei)	Kallang, Singapore
20:00 UTC+8	Hazim 67'	Report	Ramazotti 32'	Stadium: Jalan Besar Stadium; Referee: W. Ravisanthiran

24 June 2016 Round 18	(Singapore) Balestier Khalsa	1 – 4	DPMM (Brunei)	Kallang, Singapore
20:00 UTC+8	Lotinac 57' (pen.)	Report	Ramazotti 18', 30', 79'; Sérgio 50'	Stadium: Jalan Besar Stadium; Referee: Ahmad A'Qashah

5 August 2016 Round 19	(Brunei) DPMM	2 – 1	Albirex Niigata (S) (Japan)	Bandar Seri Begawan, Brunei
20:15 UTC+8	Ramazotti 29' (pen.); Yura 90'	Report	Kumada 52'	Stadium: Hassanal Bolkiah National Stadium; Referee: Jansen Foo

11 August 2016 Round 20	(Singapore) Geylang International	1 – 1	DPMM (Brunei)	Bedok, Singapore
19:30 UTC+8	Camarasa 5'	Report	Azwan A. 71'	Stadium: Bedok Stadium; Referee: Farhad Mohammad

19 August 2016 Round 21	(Brunei) DPMM	3 – 0	Warriors (Singapore)	Bandar Seri Begawan, Brunei
20:15 UTC+8	Zulfadli 26' (o.g.); Ramazotti 60'; Sérgio 90+4'	Report		Stadium: Hassanal Bolkiah National Stadium; Referee: G. Letchman

26 August 2016 Round 22	(Singapore) Hougang United	1 – 2	DPMM (Brunei)	Kallang, Singapore
19:30 UTC+8	Plazibat 9'	Report	Ramazotti 51', 52'	Stadium: Jalan Besar Stadium; Referee: Ahmad A'Qashah

26 September 2016 Round 24	(Brunei) DPMM	5 – 3	Garena Young Lions (Singapore)	Bandar Seri Begawan, Brunei
20:15 UTC+8	McLean 4'; Ramazotti 8', 10', 90+3' (pen.); Maududi 29'	Report	Shafeeq 46'; Amri 53', 60'	Stadium: Hassanal Bolkiah National Stadium; Referee: Farhad Mohammad

1 October 2016 Round 25	(Singapore) Tampines Rovers	0 – 1	DPMM (Brunei)	Jurong West, Singapore
19:30 UTC+8		Report	Azwan A. 4'	Stadium: Jurong West Stadium; Referee: G. Letchman

26 October 2016 Round 27	(Singapore) Balestier Khalsa	2 – 0	DPMM (Brunei)	Toa Payoh, Singapore
19:30 UTC+8	Tokić 67'; Krištić 90+5'	Report		Stadium: Toa Payoh Stadium; Referee: Sukhbir Singh

Pos	Team	Pld	W	D	L	GF	GA	GD	Pts	Qualification
1	(Japan) Albirex Niigata (S) (Note: The two foreign clubs – Albirex Niigata (S) and DPMM FC – as well as the Football Association of Singapore (FAS) under-21 team, Young Lions, are not eligible for any AFC competition spots.)	24	16	2	6	50	24	+26	50	
2	Tampines Rovers	24	15	4	5	50	28	+22	49	Qualification to AFC Champions League Preliminary Round 1 or AFC Cup Group Stage
3	(Brunei) DPMM FC	24	12	5	7	47	37	+10	41	
4	Home United	24	11	4	9	50	42	+8	37	Qualification to AFC Cup Play-off Round
5	Geylang International	24	10	7	7	35	29	+6	37	

Updated to match(es) played on 31 October 2016. Source: S.League
Rules for classification: 1) points; 2) goal difference; 3) number of goals scored; 4) number of wins

=== Singapore Cup ===
Win Draw Loss

30 June 2016 Quarter Final Leg 1	(Brunei) DPMM	0 – 3	Ceres-La Salle (Philippines)	Kallang, Singapore
		Report	Ott 15'; Schröck 26', 72'	Stadium: Jalan Besar Stadium; Referee: Nathan Chan

3 July 2016 Quarter Final Leg 2	(Philippines) Ceres-La Salle	2 – 3	DPMM (Brunei)	Bishan, Singapore
	Schröck 16'; Bienve 53'		Shah Razen 54'; Ramazotti 63'; McLean 90'	Stadium: Bishan Stadium; Referee: Muhammad Taqi

Ceres-La Salle won 5–3 on aggregate.

=== League Cup ===
Pos	Team	Pld	W	D	L	GF	GA	GD	Pts	Qualification
1	(Brunei) DPMM FC	3	3	0	0	8	1	+7	9	Advance to semi-final
2	Tampines Rovers	3	2	0	1	10	6	+4	6	Advance to semi-final
3	Hougang United	3	1	0	2	8	9	−1	3	
4	Warriors FC	3	0	0	3	1	11	−10	0	

Source: S.League

Win Draw Loss

==== Group stage ====
13 July 2016 Group Stage M1	(Brunei) DPMM	4 – 0	Warriors (Singapore)	Kallang, Singapore
19:30 UTC+8	Sérgio 62'; Adi 69'; Ramazotti 78', 90'	Report		Stadium: Jalan Besar Stadium; Referee: W. Ravisanthiran

17 July 2016 Group Stage M2	(Singapore) Hougang United	0 – 2	DPMM (Brunei)	Hougang, Singapore
19:30 UTC+8		Report	Sérgio 44' (pen.); Ramazotti 89' (pen.)	Stadium: Hougang Stadium; Referee: Nathan Chan

21 July 2016 Group Stage M3	(Brunei) DPMM	2 – 1	Tampines Rovers (Singapore)	Kallang, Singapore
19:30 UTC+8	Adi 24'; Azim 86'	Report	Billy Mehmet 75' (pen.)	Stadium: Jalan Besar Stadium; Referee: Ahmad A'Qashah

==== Knockout stage ====
26 July 2016 Semi-final	(Brunei) DPMM	1 – 0	Home United (Singapore)	Kallang, Singapore
19:30 UTC+8	Ramazotti 27'	Report		Stadium: Jalan Besar Stadium; Referee: Muhammad Taqi

30 July 2016 Final	(Brunei) DPMM	0 – 2	Albirex Niigata (S) (Japan)	Kallang, Singapore
20:00 UTC+8		Report	Kumada 42'; Kawata 79'	Stadium: Jalan Besar Stadium; Referee: Sukhbir Singh
