= 2015 Singapore League Cup =

Tournament details
- Country: Singapore
- Dates: 22 June – 10 July 2015
- Teams: 10

Final positions
- Champions: (Japan) Albirex Niigata (S) (2 titles)
- Runners-up: Balestier Khalsa

Tournament statistics
- Matches played: 15
- Goals scored: 49 (3.27 per match)
- Top goal scorer(s): (Croatia) Miroslav Krištić (6 goals)

The 2015 Singapore League Cup (known as the TNP League Cup for sponsorship reasons) was the ninth season of Singapore's premier club football tournament organised by the Football Association of Singapore. (Brunei) DPMM FC were the defending champions, having won their third trophy the previous year. Albirex Niigata (S) were the eventual winners after defeating 2013 champions Balestier Khalsa 2–1 in the finals.

Unlike the previous three tournaments held in 2012, 2013 and 2014, the League Cup Plate Competition between the third-placing teams in each group after the group stages were cancelled from 2015 onward.

== Teams ==
A total of 10 teams participated in the 2015 Singapore League Cup, eight S.League clubs and two National Football League clubs. Courts Young Lions and Harimau Muda B did not participate in this year's edition of the Singapore League Cup.

- (Japan) Albirex Niigata (S)
- Balestier Khalsa
- (Brunei) DPMM FC
- Geylang International
- Home United
- Hougang United
- Singapore Recreation Club
- Sporting Westlake
- Tampines Rovers
- Warriors FC

== Group stage ==
=== Group A ===
Pos	Team	Pld	W	D	L	GF	GA	GD	Pts	Qualification
1	Geylang International	3	2	1	0	10	4	+6	7	Advance to semi-final
2	Hougang United	3	1	2	0	4	3	+1	5	Advance to semi-final
3	(Brunei) DPMM FC	3	1	0	2	7	5	+2	3	
4	Singapore Recreation Club	3	0	1	2	1	10	−9	1	

Source: S.League

23 June 2015	Hougang United	1-0	(Brunei) DPMM FC	Hougang Stadium
20:30 UTC+8	Sotirović 21'			Referee: Ahmad A'Qashah

23 June 2015	Geylang International	4-0	Singapore Recreation Club	Jalan Besar Stadium
20:30 UTC+8	Castanheira 10'; Hafiz 11', 23', 45'			Referee: Muhd Syahir

27 June 2015	Hougang United	2-2	Geylang International	Hougang Stadium
20:30 UTC+8	Gama 84', 90'		Kapláň 22'; Castanheira 53'	Referee: Muhd Taqi

27 June 2015	(Brunei) DPMM FC	5-0	Singapore Recreation Club	Jalan Besar Stadium
20:30 UTC+8	Maududi 8'; Paulo Sérgio 50'; Ramazotti 62', 65'; McLean 83'			Referee: Farhad Mohd

2 July 2015	Geylang International	4-2	(Brunei) DPMM FC	Jalan Besar Stadium
20:30 UTC+8	Castanheira 15', 68', 71'; Kapláň 22'		Paulo Sérgio 30'; Ramazotti 38'	Referee: Sukhbir Singh

2 July 2015	Hougang United	1-1	Singapore Recreation Club	Hougang Stadium
20:30 UTC+8	Chang 90'		Hammingway 64'	Referee: G. Letchman

=== Group B ===
Pos	Team	Pld	W	D	L	GF	GA	GD	Pts	Qualification
1	Balestier Khalsa	2	1	1	0	6	2	+4	4	Advance to semi-final
2	Warriors	2	1	0	1	1	4	−3	3	
3	Tampines Rovers	2	0	1	1	2	3	−1	1	

Source: S.League

22 June 2015	Balestier Khalsa	4-0	Warriors FC	Toa Payoh Stadium
20:30 UTC+8	Krištić 43', 48', 90'; Ang 74'			Referee: Jansen Foo

26 June 2015	Tampines Rovers	2-2	Balestier Khalsa	Jurong West Stadium
20:30 UTC+8	Mustafić 52'; Roskam 58'		Zulkiffli 54'; Fadhil 71'	Referee: Sukhbir Singh

1 July 2015	Warriors FC	1-0	Tampines Rovers	Woodlands Stadium
20:30 UTC+8	Vélez 37'			Referee: Muhd Taqi

=== Group C ===
Pos	Team	Pld	W	D	L	GF	GA	GD	Pts	Qualification
1	Albirex Niigata (S)	2	2	0	0	4	0	+4	6	Advance to semi-final
2	Home United	2	1	0	1	3	2	+1	3	
3	Sporting Westlake	2	0	0	2	0	5	−5	0	

Source: S.League

22 June 2015	(Japan) Albirex Niigata (S)	2-0	Home United	Jurong East Stadium
20:30 UTC+8	Yamada 81'; Nagasaki 90'			Referee: Farhad Mohd

26 June 2015	(Japan) Albirex Niigata (S)	2-0	Sporting Westlake	Jurong East Stadium
20:30 UTC+8	Kawata 36'; Taki 80'			Referee: G. Letchman

1 July 2015	Home United	3-0	Sporting Westlake	Yishun Stadium
20:30 UTC+8	Azhar 21', 34'; Ang 46'			Referee: Ahmad A'Qashah

== Knockout phase ==
=== Bracket ===
Semi-finals		Final
Geylang International	0
(Japan) Albirex Niigata (S)	3	(Japan) Albirex Niigata (S)	2
Balestier Khalsa	3	Balestier Khalsa	1
Hougang United	2

=== Semi-finals ===
5 July 2015
20:30 UTC+8

Geylang International	0 – 3	(Japan) Albirex Niigata (S)
	Details	Kawata 11'; Nagasaki 82'; Kogure 87'

Jalan Besar Stadium, Singapore
Referee: Farhad Mohd

6 July 2015
20:30 UTC+8

Balestier Khalsa	3 – 2	Hougang United
Krištić 27' (pen.), 35'; Ang 85'	Details	Fareez 1'; Delgado 74'

Jalan Besar Stadium, Singapore
Referee: Ahmad A'Qashah

=== Final ===
10 July 2015
20:30 UTC+8

(Japan) Albirex Niigata (S)	2 – 1	Balestier Khalsa
Kogure 76'; Nagasaki 89'	Details	Krištić 15'

Jalan Besar Stadium, Singapore
Referee: Sukhbir Singh

== Statistics ==
=== Top scorers ===
Rank	Player	Club	Goals
1	(Croatia) Miroslav Krištić	Balestier Khalsa	6
2	(Brazil) Bruno Castanheira	Geylang International	5
3	(Japan) Kento Nagasaki	(Japan) Albirex Niigata (S)	3
3	(Brazil) Rafael Ramazotti de Quadros	(Brunei) DPMM FC	3
3	(Singapore) Hafiz Nor	Geylang International	3
6	(Japan) Atsushi Kawata	(Japan) Albirex Niigata (S)	2
6	(Japan) Fumiya Kogure	(Japan) Albirex Niigata (S)	2
6	(Singapore) Ignatius Ang	Balestier Khalsa	2
6	(Portugal) Paulo Sérgio	(Brunei) DPMM FC	2
6	(Slovakia) Jozef Kapláň	Geylang International	2
6	(Singapore) Azhar Sairudin	Home United	2
6	(Brazil) Diego Gama de Oliveira	Hougang United	2
13	15 players		1

Source:S.League

== Winners ==
2015 TNP League Cup winner

2nd title

== See also ==
- S.League
- Singapore FA Cup
- Singapore Cup
- Singapore Charity Shield
- Football Association of Singapore
- List of football clubs in Singapore
