= 2016 Singapore Community Shield =

(Japan) Albirex Niigata (S)	(Brunei) DPMM FC
3	2
- Date: 13 February 2016
- Venue: Jalan Besar Stadium, Singapore
- Referee: Jansen Foo (SIN)
- Attendance: 2,481

The 2016 Singapore Community Shield (also known as the Great Eastern Community Shield for sponsorship reasons) was the 9th edition of the Singapore Community Shield held on 13 February 2016 at Jalan Besar Stadium, between the winners of the previous season's S.League and Singapore Cup competitions. The match was contested by 2015 Singapore Cup winners Albirex Niigata (S) and 2015 S.League champions DPMM FC.

Albirex Niigata (S) won the Shield for the first time after defeating DPMM FC 3–2.

== Match ==
=== Details ===
13 February 2016
19:45 SST

Albirex Niigata (S) (Japan)	3–2	(Brunei) DPMM FC
Yamada 16'; Kamata 36'; Fujihara 59'	Details	Azwan 65'; Tanaka 90+2' (o.g.)

Jalan Besar Stadium, Singapore
Attendance: 2,481
Referee: Jansen Foo (SIN)

Albirex Niigata (S)	Brunei DPMM

GK	21	(Japan) Yosuke Nozawa
DF	2	(Japan) Mikiya Yamada	(substituted off) 61'
DF	3	(Japan) Kento Fujihara	(substituted off) 77'
DF	4	(Japan) Atsushi Shirota
DF	5	(Japan) Atsushi Shirota
DF	20	(Japan) Rui Kumada
MF	8	(Japan) Masaya Jitozono
MF	10	(Japan) Kento Nagasaki (c)
MF	14	(Japan) Daichi Ishiyama	(substituted off) 88'
FW	13	(Japan) Atsushi Kawata
FW	18	(Japan) Hiroyoshi Kamata
Substitutes:
GK	1	(Japan) Eita Kasagawa
DF	7	(Japan) Tomoki Menda	(substituted on) 61'
DF	15	(Japan) Tadaaki Yazawa	(substituted on) 88'
DF	17	(Japan) Ryo Kurihara
MF	16	(Japan) Ryuki Matsuya
FW	9	(Japan) Kazuki Mine	(substituted on) 77'
FW	24	(Japan) Shuma Miyata
Head coach:
(Japan) Naoki Naruo

GK	25	(Brunei) Wardun Yussof
DF	3	(Brunei) Sairol Sahari (c)
DF	5	(Northern Ireland) Brian McLean
DF	14	(Brunei) Helmi Zambin
DF	21	(Brunei) Abdul Aziz		(substituted off) 83'
MF	6	(Brunei) Azwan Saleh	(yellow card) 72'
MF	7	(Brunei) Azwan Ali Rahman
MF	10	(Brunei) Nur Ikhwan Othman		(substituted off) 63'
MF	12	(Brunei) Maududi Hilmi Kasmi
FW	8	(Portugal) Paulo Sérgio
FW	19	(Brazil) Rafael Ramazotti
Substitutes:
GK	1	(Brunei) Azman Ilham Noor
DF	4	(Brunei) Awangku Fakharazzi
DF	23	(Brunei) Yura Indera Putera		(substituted on) 83'
MF	11	(Brunei) Najib Tarif
MF	16	(Brunei) Khairul Anwar Abdul Rahim		(substituted on) 63'
FW	20	(Brunei) Adi Said
FW	22	(Brunei) Shahrazen Said
Head coach:
(Scotland) Steve Kean

Match officials

- Referee: Jansen Foo (SIN)
- Assistant referees:
  - Ong Chai Lee (SIN)
  - Andrew Kee (SIN)
- Fourth official: G. Letchman (SIN)
- Match commissioner: Mohd Izmil (SIN)

Match rules

- 90 minutes.
- Penalty shoot-out if scores level after 90 minutes.
- Maximum of seven-named substitutes.
- Maximum of three substitutions.

== See also ==
- 2016 S.League
- 2016 Singapore Cup
- 2016 Singapore League Cup
