= 2016 Singapore League Cup =

Tournament details
- Country: Singapore
- Dates: 13–30 July 2016
- Teams: 8

Final positions
- Champions: (Japan) Albirex Niigata (S)
- Runners-up: (Brunei) DPMM FC

Tournament statistics
- Matches played: 18
- Goals scored: 31 (1.72 per match)
- Top goal scorer: Jozef Kapláň (5 goals)
- All statistics correct as of 21 July 2016.

The 2016 Singapore League Cup (known as The New Paper League Cup for sponsorship reasons) is the tenth edition of the Singapore League Cup, Singapore's premier club football tournament organised by the Football Association of Singapore. (Japan) Albirex Niigata (S) are the defending champions, having won their second trophy the previous year. The tournament was held from 13 to 30 July 2016.

== Teams ==
A total of 8 teams participate in the 2016 Singapore League Cup with all clubs coming from the S.League. Garena Young Lions did not be participating in this edition of the Singapore League Cup.

- (Japan) Albirex Niigata (S)
- Balestier Khalsa
- (Brunei) DPMM FC
- Geylang International
- Home United
- Hougang United
- Tampines Rovers
- Warriors FC

== Group stage ==
=== Group A ===
Pos	Team	Pld	W	D	L	GF	GA	GD	Pts	Qualification
1	(Brunei) DPMM FC	3	3	0	0	8	1	+7	9	Advance to semi-final
2	Tampines Rovers	3	2	0	1	10	6	+4	6	Advance to semi-final
3	Hougang United	3	1	0	2	8	9	−1	3	
4	Warriors FC	3	0	0	3	1	11	−10	0	

Source: S.League
13 July 2016
19:30 UTC+8

DPMM FC (Brunei)	4 – 0	Warriors FC
Sérgio 62'; Adi 69'; Ramazotti 78', 90'	Details

Jalan Besar Stadium, Singapore
Referee: W. Ravisanthiran
13 July 2016
19:30 UTC+8

Tampines Rovers	6 – 4	Hougang United
Shahdan 28'; Na'iim 32' (o.g.); Webb 35'; Sufian 44' (pen.); Mehmet 75' (pen.); Saifullah 83'	Details	Kogure 56'; Kapláň 67', 87'; Plazibat 90'

Jurong West Stadium, Singapore
Referee: Sukhbir Singh

17 July 2016
19:30 UTC+8

Warriors FC	0 – 3	Tampines Rovers
	Details	Mehmet 45'; Kwok 55'; Ariyan 62'

Jalan Besar Stadium, Singapore
Referee: Jansen Foo
17 July 2016
19:30 UTC+8

Hougang United	0 – 2	(Brunei) DPMM FC
	Details	Sérgio 44' (pen.); Ramazotti 89' (pen.)

Hougang Stadium, Singapore
Referee: Nathan Chan

21 July 2016
19:30 UTC+8

Hougang United	4 – 1	Warriors
Iqbal Hussain 42' Fumiya Kogure 67' Jozef Kapláň 87' 90'	Details	Hafiz Rahim 71'

Hougang Stadium, Singapore
Referee: Farhad Mohd
21 July 2016
19:30 UTC+8

DPMM FC (Brunei)	2 – 1	Tampines Rovers
Adi Said 24'; Azim Izamuddin 86'	Details	Billy Mehmet 75' (pen.)

Jalan Besar Stadium, Singapore
Referee: Ahmad A'Qashah

=== Group B ===
Pos	Team	Pld	W	D	L	GF	GA	GD	Pts	Qualification
1	Albirex Niigata (S)	3	2	0	1	4	1	+3	6	Advance to semi-final
2	Home United	3	1	1	1	7	4	+3	4	Advance to semi-final
3	Geylang International	3	1	1	1	3	7	−4	4	
4	Balestier Khalsa	3	0	2	1	4	6	−2	2	

Source: S.League
14 July 2016
19:30 UTC+8

Balestier Khalsa	2 – 2	Geylang International
Tokić 9'; Fadhil 22'	Details	Hartmann 54', 90'

Toa Payoh Stadium, Singapore
Referee: Ahmad A'Qashah
14 July 2016
19:30 UTC+8

Home United	0 – 2	(Japan) Albirex Niigata (S)
	Details	Inui 32'; Kamata 69'

Bishan Stadium, Singapore
Referee: Farhad Mohd

18 July 2016
19:30 UTC+8

Geylang International	0 – 5	Home United
	Details	Shamil 21', 65'; Ilsø 44', 61'; Yeo 90'

Bedok Stadium, Singapore
Referee: Sukhbir Singh
18 July 2016
19:30 UTC+8

Albirex Niigata (S) (Japan)	2 – 0	Balestier Khalsa
Menda 45'; Jitozono 46'	Details

Jurong East Stadium, Singapore
Referee: G. Letchman

22 July 2016
19:45 UTC+8

Geylang International	1 – 0	(Japan) Albirex Niigata (S)
Shawal Anuar 34'	Details

Bedok Stadium, Singapore
Referee: Muhd Taqi
22 July 2016
19:45 UTC+8

Balestier Khalsa	2 – 2	Home United
Niko Tokić 27'; Jamil Ali 54'	Details	Song Ui-young 30'; Hanafi Salleh 85' (o.g.)

Jalan Besar Stadium, Singapore
Referee: W Ravisanthiran

== Knockout phase ==
=== Bracket ===
Semi-finals		Final
(Brunei) DPMM FC	1
Home United	0	(Brunei) DPMM FC	0
(Japan) Albirex Niigata (S)	4	(Japan) Albirex Niigata (S)	2
Tampines Rovers	0

=== Semi-finals ===
26 July 2016
19:30 UTC+8

(Brunei) DPMM FC	1 – 0	Home United
Ramazotti 27'	Details

Jalan Besar Stadium, Singapore
Referee: Muhd Taqi

26 July 2016
19:30 UTC+8

(Japan) Albirex Niigata (S)	4 – 0	Tampines Rovers
Kawata 32', 67', 72'; Tatsuro 87'	Details

Jurong East Stadium, Singapore
Referee: Farhad Mohd

=== Final ===
10 July 2016
20:00 UTC+8

(Brunei) DPMM FC	0 – 2	(Japan) Albirex Niigata (S)
	Details	Kumada 42'; Kawata 79'

Jalan Besar Stadium, Singapore
Referee: Sukhbir Singh

== Plate knockout phase ==
The plate knockout phase involved the four teams that finished third in the preliminary phase of the tournament. There are two rounds of matches, with each round eliminating half of the teams entering that round. The successive rounds were: semi-finals and final. For each game in the plate knockout phase, a draw was followed by thirty minutes of extra time (except the final); if scores were still level there would be a penalty shoot-out to determine who progressed to the next round.

Semi-finals
Hougang United	2
Balestier Khalsa	1
Geylang International	1
Warriors FC	0

Final
Hougang United	1
Geylang International	2

=== Plate semi-finals ===
25 July 2016
19:30

Hougang United	2–1	Balestier Khalsa
Kogure 45'; Hussain 80'	Report	Krištić 55'

Jalan Besar Stadium
Referee: Jansen Foo

25 July 2016
20:00

Geylang International	1–0	Warriors FC
Hartmann 90'	Report

Jalan Besar Stadium
Referee: Nathan Chan

=== Plate final ===
30 July 2016
17:00

Hougang United	1–2	Geylang International
Kapláň 44'	Report	Hartmann 32'; Anuar 36'

Jalan Besar Stadium
Referee: Ahmad A'Qashah

== Statistics ==
=== Top scorers ===
As of matches played on 30 October 2016.

Rank	Player	Club	Goals
1	(Slovenia) Jozef Kapláň	Hougang United	5
2	(Japan) Atsushi Kawata	(Japan) Albirex Niigata (S)	4
2	(Brazil) Rafael Ramazotti	(Brunei) DPMM FC	4
2	(Philippines) Mark Hartmann	Geylang International	4
5	(Japan) Fumiya Kogure	Hougang United	3
5	(Republic of Ireland) Billy Mehmet	Tampines Rovers	3
7	8 players		2
15	18 players		1

== Winners ==
2016 Singapore League Cup winner

3rd title

== See also ==
- S.League
- Singapore FA Cup
- Singapore Cup
- Singapore Community Shield
- Football Association of Singapore
- List of football clubs in Singapore
