= 2015 Albirex Niigata Singapore FC season =

Albirex Niigata FC (Singapore)
2015 season
- Chairman: Daisuke Korenaga
- Head Coach: Tatsuyuki Okuyama
- Stadium: Jurong East Stadium
Home colours	Away colours

The 2015 season was Albirex Niigata FC (Singapore)'s 12th season in the S.League.

== Sponsors ==
- Main Sponsor: Canon
- Uniform Sponsors for S.League: Yoppy, TDK-Lambda, RAIZZIN, Langrich
- Club Sponsors: COMM Pte Ltd, Mitsubishi Corporation, Kikkoman, Paris Miki, RGF Singapore, Daiho, WINN, SOODE, Kirin, CLEO, Nihon Assist Singapore, Sanpoutei Ramen, aguchi, ProtecA
- Apparel Sponsor: Mafro Sports
- Club Albirex: JTB, TAWARAYA, Shogakukan Asia, Konohana Kindergarten, Niigata Kenjinkai Singapore, Keihin Multi-Trans (S) Pte Ltd, IKYU, Hitachi, Taiyou Kouhatsuden Mura, IPPIN, CROWNLINE Singapore, Samurice, Porterhouse, NIKKEI, Zipan Resort Travel

== S.League ==
Date	Opponents	H / A	Result F–A	Scorers
2 March 2015	Tampines Rovers	H	0–1	
7 March 2015	Brunei DPMM	A		
14 March 2015	Warriors	A		
20 March 2015	Balestier Khalsa	A		
3 April 2015	Harimau Muda	A		
8 April 2015	Geylang International	H		
15 April 2015	Courts Young Lions	H		
1 May 2015	Home United	A		
14 March 2015	Hougang United	H		
6 May 2015	Tampines Rovers	A		
14 May 2015	Brunei DPMM	H		
18 May 2015	Warriors	H		
23 July 2015	Balestier Khalsa	H		
30 July 2015	Harimau Muda	H		
2 August 2015	Geylang International	A		
6 August 2015	Courts Young Lions	A		
20 August 2015	Home United	H		
28 August 2015	Hougang United	A		
11 September 2015	Tampines Rovers	H		
16 September 2015	Brunei DPMM	H		
25 September 2015	Warriors	A		
18 October 2015	Balestier Khalsa	A		
21 October 2015	Harimau Muda	A		
29 October 2015	Geylang International	H		
1 November 2015	Courts Young Lions	H		
5 November 2015	Home United	A		
20 November 2015	Hougang United	H		

Pos	Team	Pld	W	D	L	GF	GA	GD	Pts	Qualification
1	(Brunei) DPMM FC (Note: The three foreign clubs – Albirex Niigata (S), DPMM FC and Harimau Muda – as well as the Football Association of Singapore (FAS) under-23 team, Young Lions, are not eligible for any AFC competition spots.)	27	15	7	5	48	26	+22	52	
2	Tampines Rovers	27	14	6	7	42	25	+17	48	Qualification to AFC Champions League Qualifying Round 1 or AFC Cup Group Stage
3	(Japan) Albirex Niigata (S)	27	13	6	8	27	17	+10	45	
4	Balestier Khalsa	27	12	8	7	39	35	+4	44	Qualification to AFC Cup Group Stage
5	Warriors FC	27	11	4	12	40	51	−11	37	

Source: S.League
Rules for classification: 1) points; 2) goal difference; 3) number of goals scored; 4) number of wins

== Singapore Cup ==
Date	Round	Opponents	H / A	Result F–A	Scorers

== Singapore League Cup ==
Date	Round	Opponents	H / A	Result F–A	Scorers

== Squad statistics ==
No.	Pos.	Name	League		Singapore Cup		League Cup		Total		Discipline	
No.	Pos.	Name	Apps	Goals	Apps	Goals	Apps	Goals	Apps	Goals	Yellow card	Red card
1	GK	(Japan) Kenjiro Ogino	0	0	0	0	0	0	0	0	0	0
2	DF	(Japan) Mikiya Yamada	0	0	0	0	0	0	0	0	0	0
3	DF	(Japan) Kento Fujihara	0	0	0	0	0	0	0	0	0	0
4	DF	(Japan) Takahiro Saito	0	0	0	0	0	0	0	0	0	0
5	MF	(Japan) Yusuke Mukai	0	0	0	0	0	0	0	0	0	0
6	DF	(Japan) Itsuki Yamada	0	0	0	0	0	0	0	0	0	0
7	MF	(Japan) Hikaru Mizuno	0	0	0	0	0	0	0	0	0	0
8	MF	(Japan) Fumiya Kogure	0	0	0	0	0	0	0	0	0	0
9	FW	(Japan) Rion Taki	0	0	0	0	0	0	0	0	0	0
10	MF	(Japan) Kento Nagasaki	0	0	0	0	0	0	0	0	0	0
11	FW	(Japan) Shotaro Ihata	0	0	0	0	0	0	0	0	0	0
13	FW	(Japan) Atsushi Kawata	0	0	0	0	0	0	0	0	0	0
14	MF	(Japan) Shun Inaba	0	0	0	0	0	0	0	0	0	0
15	DF	(Japan) Ryo Hagiwara	0	0	0	0	0	0	0	0	0	0
16	MF	(Japan) Ryuki Matsuya	0	0	0	0	0	0	0	0	0	0
17	MF	(Japan) Takuya Serizawa	0	0	0	0	0	0	0	0	0	0
18	FW	(Japan) Takaya Nojiri	0	0	0	0	0	0	0	0	0	0
19	FW	(Japan) Tetsu Kudo	0	0	0	0	0	0	0	0	0	0
21	GK	(Japan) Yosuke Nozawa	0	0	0	0	0	0	0	0	0	0
22	GK	(Japan) Yuki Hidaka	0	0	0	0	0	0	0	0	0	0
23	DF	(Japan) Ryota Nakahara	0	0	0	0	0	0	0	0	0	0
24	DF	(Japan) Taiga Chono	0	0	0	0	0	0	0	0	0	0
25	DF	(Japan) Ryoya Matsuda	0	0	0	0	0	0	0	0	0	0
26	MF	(Japan) Hikaru Yanagawa	0	0	0	0	0	0	0	0	0	0
—	–	Own goals	–	0	–	0	–	0	–	0	–	–

== Transfers ==
=== In ===
Date	Pos.	Name	From	Fee
22 December 2014	MF	(Japan) Fumiya Kogure	(Japan) Albirex Niigata	Undisclosed
26 December 2014	FW	(Japan) Atsushi Kawata	(Japan) Hannan University	Undisclosed
26 December 2014	FW	(Japan) Rion Taki	(Japan) Hannan University	Undisclosed
1 January 2015	GK	(Japan) Yosuke Nozawa	(Japan) Matsumoto Yamaga	Undisclosed
8 January 2015	DF	(Japan) Mikiya Yamada	(Japan) Kansai University	Undisclosed
9 January 2015	FW	(Japan) Shotaro Ihata	Southern Myanmar United	Undisclosed
26 January 2015	DF	(Japan) Takahiro Saito	(Japan) Vonds Ichihara	Undisclosed
27 January 2015	MF	(Japan) Hikaru Mizuno	(Japan) FC Ryukyu	Undisclosed

=== Out ===
Date	Pos.	Name	To	Fee
1 November 2014	DF	(Japan) Soichiro Tanaka	(Cambodia) Albirex Niigata Phnom Penh	Undisclosed
1 November 2014	MF	(Japan) Kazuya Okazaki	(Japan) Fagiano Okayama Next	Loan return
1 December 2014	MF	(Japan) Koki Akasaka	Released	Free
1 December 2014	MF	(Japan) Koya Yoshida	Released	Free
1 December 2014	MF	(Japan) Kazuya Fukuzaki	(Japan) Kagoshima United FC	Free
1 December 2014	MF	(Japan) Hiroki Morisaki	(Japan) FC Iseshima	Free
1 December 2014	FW	(Japan) Ikuma Osaka	Released	Free
1 December 2014	FW	(Japan) Niji Sasadaira	Released	Free
1 December 2014	DF	(Japan) Shota Muto	Released	Free
1 December 2014	DF	(Japan) Kentaro Miyakawa	Released	Free
1 December 2014	FW	(Japan) Yoshinaga Arima	Released	Free
1 December 2014	MF	(Japan) Kaoru Nishio	Released	Free
1 December 2014	MF	(Japan) Seiji Yamaguchi	Released	Free
1 December 2014	GK	(Japan) Mizuki Ito	Released	Free
15 December 2014	MF	(Japan) Kosuke Matsuda	(Japan) Saurcos Fukui	Free
4 January 2015	DF	(Japan) Taiyo Nishida	Retired	
9 January 2015	DF	(Japan) Shuhei Hotta	(Thailand) Songkhla United	Undisclosed
15 January 2015	GK	(Japan) Kazuki Kishigami	(Japan) Nara Club	Undisclosed
16 January 2015	DF	(Japan) Norihiro Kawakami	(Thailand) Trat	Undisclosed
20 January 2015	FW	(Japan) Kazuki Sakamoto	(Japan) MIO Biwako Shiga	Undisclosed
21 January 2015	MF	(Japan) Keisuke Ota	(Germany) VdS Nievenheim	Undisclosed

== Team Staff ==
Team Manager: (Singapore) Yeo Junxian
Coach: (Japan) Tomoaki Sasaki
Trainer: (Japan) Kohei Tanaka
