= 2016 Singapore Cup =

RHB Singapore Cup

Tournament details
- Country: Singapore
- Dates: From 26 May 2016
- Teams: 12

Final positions
- Champions: (Japan) Albirex Niigata (S)
- Runners-up: Tampines Rovers
- Third place: (Philippines) Ceres-La Salle
- Fourth place: Balestier Khalsa

Tournament statistics
- Matches played: 14
- Goals scored: 48 (3.43 per match)
- Top goal scorer(s): (Philippines) Stephan Schröck (7 goals)
- All statistics correct as of 3 July 2016.

The 2016 Singapore Cup (also known as the RHB Singapore Cup for sponsorship reasons) is the 19th edition of Singapore's annual premier club football tournament organised by the Football Association of Singapore. Albirex Niigata (S) are the defending champions, having won their first trophy the previous year. The final was won by Albirex Niigata (S) 2–0. Tampines Rovers striker Billy Mehmet received the man of the match award.

== Teams ==
A total of 12 teams participate in the 2016 Singapore Cup. 9 of the teams are from domestic S.League while the other three are invited from Cambodia and the Philippines.

S.League Clubs

- (Japan) Albirex Niigata (S)
- Balestier Khalsa
- (Brunei) DPMM FC
- Geylang International
- Home United
- Hougang United
- Tampines Rovers
- Warriors FC
- (Singapore) Young Lions

Invited Foreign Teams

- (Philippines) Ceres-La Salle
- (Philippines) Global FC
- (Cambodia) Nagaworld FC

== Format ==
Eight teams were drawn for the preliminary round while the other four seeded teams received a bye for that round. The eight teams will play against one another in a single-legged knockout basis. Winners of this round will progress and advance to the quarter-finals. Thereafter, matches are played in two legs with the exception of the one-match final.

For any match in the knockout stage, a draw after 90 minutes of regulation time is followed by two 15 minute periods of extra time to determine a winner. If the teams are still tied, a penalty shoot-out is held to determine a winner.

== Bracket ==
Preliminary round
Geylang International	2
Warriors FC	1
Home United	2
Hougang United	1
(Cambodia) Nagaworld FC	0
(Philippines) Global FC	5
(Philippines) Ceres-La Salle	3
(Singapore) Young Lions	1

Quarter-finals
(Japan) Albirex Niigata (S)	2	2	4
Geylang International	0	2	2
Balestier Khalsa	2	2	4
Home United	1	2	3
Tampines Rovers	3	2	5
(Philippines) Global FC	1	1	2
(Brunei) DPMM FC	0	3	3
(Philippines) Ceres-La Salle	3	2	5

Semi-finals
(Japan) Albirex Niigata (S)	1	1	2
Balestier Khalsa	0	0	0
Tampines Rovers	2	3	5
(Philippines) Ceres-La Salle	1	2	3

Final
(Japan) Albirex Niigata (S)	2
Tampines Rovers	0

== Preliminary round ==
The draw for the preliminary round was held on 24 April 2016 at Connaught Drive. Eight teams involved in this round will play in a single leg knockout basis. The matches will be played from 26 to 29 May 2016. Winners of this round will progress and advance to the quarter-finals.

26 May 2016
19:30 UTC+8

Home United	2–1	Hougang United
Azhar 48'; Ilsø 90'	Details	Kogure 58'

Bishan Stadium, Singapore
Referee: G. Letchman

27 May 2016
19:45 UTC+8

Geylang International	2–1	Warriors FC
Sahil 46'; Faritz 54'	Details	Madhu 21'

Jalan Besar Stadium, Singapore
Referee: Nathan Chan

28 May 2016
19:30 UTC+8

Nagaworld FC (Cambodia)	0–5	(Philippines) Global FC
	Details	Minegishi 9', 10'; Clariño 32'; Nazari 77'; Sato 84'

Jalan Besar Stadium, Singapore
Referee: Muhd Taqi

29 May 2016
19:30 UTC+8

Ceres-La Salle (Philippines)	3–1 (a.e.t.)	(Singapore) Young Lions
Schröck 44', 100'; Kim 99'	Details	Pereira 87'

Jalan Besar Stadium, Singapore
Referee: Ahmad A'Qashah

== Quarter-finals ==
Four teams (Home United, Geylang International, Global and Ceres-La Salle) will join the four seeded teams in this round after winning their matches in the preliminary round. All matches will be played in a two-legged knockout basis. Away goal rule will not be applied in this tournament. Winners of this round will progress and advance to the semi-finals.

=== Summary ===
Team 1	Agg.	Team 2	1st leg	2nd leg
Balestier Khalsa	4–3	Home United	2–1	2–2
Albirex Niigata (S) (Japan)	4–2	Geylang International	2–0	2–2
Tampines Rovers	5–2	(Philippines) Global FC	3–1	2–1
DPMM FC (Brunei)	3–5	(Philippines) Ceres-La Salle	0–3	3–2

=== Matches ===
27 June 2016
20:00 UTC+8

Balestier Khalsa	2–1	Home United
Tokić 36'; Ahmad 86'	Details	Khairul 59'

Toa Payoh Stadium, Singapore
Referee: W. Ravisanthiran
30 June 2016
20:00 UTC+8

Home United	2–2	Balestier Khalsa
Khairul 11'; Ilsø 55'	Details	Tokić 34', 59'

Bishan Stadium, Singapore
Referee: Jansen Foo

Balestier Khalsa won 4–3 on aggregate.

28 June 2016
20:00 UTC+8

Albirex Niigata (S) (Japan)	2–0	Geylang International
Jitozono 1'; Tanaka 53'	Details

Jurong East Stadium, Singapore
Referee: G. Letchman
1 July 2016
20:00 UTC+8

Geylang International	2–2	(Japan) Albirex Niigata (S)
Hartmann 23'; Sahil 44'	Details	Kawata 65', 75' (pen.)

Jalan Besar Stadium, Singapore
Referee: Sukhbir Singh

Albirex Niigata (S) won 4–2 on aggregate.

29 June 2016
20:00 UTC+8

Tampines Rovers	3–1	(Philippines) Global FC
Mehmet 15'; Fazrul 61'; Hafiz 69'	Details	Bahadoran 44'

Jurong West Stadium, Singapore
Referee: Farhad Mohd
2 July 2016
20:00 UTC+8

Global FC (Philippines)	1–2	Tampines Rovers
Minegishi 21'	Details	Mehmet 42'; Hafiz 72'

Jalan Besar Stadium, Singapore
Referee: Ahmad A'Qashah

Tampines Rovers won 5–2 on aggregate.

30 June 2016
20:00 UTC+8

DPMM FC (Brunei)	0–3	(Philippines) Ceres-La Salle
	Details	Ott 15'; Schröck 26', 72'

Jalan Besar Stadium, Singapore
Referee: Nathan Chan
3 July 2016
20:00 UTC+8

Ceres-La Salle (Philippines)	2–3	(Brunei) DPMM FC
Schröck 16'; Bienve 53'	Details	Shahrazen 54'; Ramazotti 63'; McLean 90'

Jalan Besar Stadium, Singapore
Referee: Muhd Taqi

Ceres-La Salle won 5–3 on aggregate.

== Semi-finals ==
=== Summary ===
Team 1	Agg.	Team 2	1st leg	2nd leg
Albirex Niigata (S) (Japan)	2–0	Balestier Khalsa	1–0	1–0
Tampines Rovers	5–3	(Philippines) Ceres-La Salle	2–1	3–2

=== Matches ===
9 September 2016
19:30 UTC+8

Albirex Niigata (S) (Japan)	1–0	Balestier Khalsa
Inaba 44'	Details

Jurong East Stadium, Singapore
Referee: Jansen Foo
13 September 2016
19:30 UTC+8

Balestier Khalsa	0–1	(Japan) Albirex Niigata (S)
	Details	Kumada 82'

Toa Payoh Stadium, Singapore
Referee: W Ravisanthiran

Albirex Niigata (S) won 2-0 on aggregate.

21 August 2016
19:30 UTC+8

Tampines Rovers	2–1	(Philippines) Ceres-La Salle
Mustafic 12'; Sufian 49'	Details	Bienve 17'

Jurong West Stadium, Singapore
Referee: Farhad Mohd
24 August 2016
19:45 UTC+8

Ceres-La Salle (Philippines)	2–3	Tampines Rovers
Schröck 12' (pen.); Reichelt 78'	Details	Hafiz Sujad 57'; Afiq Yunos 105'; S. Akbar 112'

Jalan Besar Stadium, Singapore
Referee: Muhd Taqi

Tampines Rovers won 5-3 on aggregate.

== Third place ==
29 October 2016
17:00 UTC+8

Balestier Khalsa	1–2	(Philippines) Ceres-La Salle
Tokić 5'	Report	Ott 64'; Schröck 69'

Jalan Besar Stadium
Referee: Ahmad A'Qashah

== Final ==
29 October 2016
20:00 UTC+8

Albirex Niigata (S) (Japan)	2–0	Tampines Rovers
Kawata 28'; Nagasaki 87'	Report

Jalan Besar Stadium
Referee: Sukhbir Singh

== Statistics ==
=== Top goalscorers ===
As of matches played on 27 August 2016.

Rank	Player	Club	Goals
1	(Philippines) Stephan Schröck	Ceres-La Salle	6
2	(Croatia) Niko Tokić	Balestier Khalsa	3
2	(Japan) Hikaru Minegishi	Global	3
2	(Singapore) Hafiz Abu Sujad	Tampines Rovers	3
5	6 players		2
11	24 players		1
