= 2015 Singapore Cup =

RHB Singapore Cup

Tournament details
- Country: Singapore
- Dates: 22 May to 27 November 2015
- Teams: 11

Final positions
- Champions: Albirex Niigata (S)
- Runners-up: Home United
- Third place: (Brunei) DPMM FC

Tournament statistics
- Matches played: 17
- Goals scored: 49 (2.88 per match)
- Top goal scorer: (Japan) Rion Taki (4 goals)

The 2015 Singapore Cup was the 18th season of Singapore's annual premier club football tournament organised by Football Association of Singapore. Due to sponsorship reasons, the Singapore Cup is also known as the RHB Singapore Cup. Balestier Khalsa were the defending champions, having won their first trophy the previous year. Albirex Niigata (S) were the eventual winners, beating Home United 2–1 in the finals.

== Teams ==
A total of 11 teams participated in the 2015 Singapore Cup. 8 of the teams were from domestic S.League and the other three were invited from the Philippines, Cambodia and Laos. Both Courts Young Lions and Harimau Muda B did not participate in this edition of Singapore Cup.

S.League Clubs

- (Japan) Albirex Niigata (S)
- Balestier Khalsa
- (Brunei) DPMM FC
- Geylang International
- Home United
- Hougang United
- Tampines Rovers
- Warriors FC

Invited Foreign Teams

- (Philippines) Global FC
- (Laos) Lao Police Club
- (Cambodia) Svay Rieng

== Format ==
Six teams were drawn for the preliminary round while the other five teams will receive a Bye in that round. They will play against one another in a single-legged knockout basis. Winners of this round will progress and advance to the quarter-finals. Thereafter, matches are played in two legs with the exception of the one-match finals. Unlike the previous season, away goals rule does not apply.

For any match in the knockout stage, a draw after 90 minutes of regulation time is followed by two 15 minute periods of extra time to determine a winner. If the teams are still tied, a penalty shoot-out is held to determine a winner.

== Knockout phase ==
=== Bracket ===
Preliminary round
Hougang United	1
(Philippines) Global FC	2
Geylang International	2
(Laos) Lao Police Club	1
(Japan) Albirex Niigata (S)	2
(Cambodia) Svay Rieng	1
Balestier Khalsa
Bye
Tampines Rovers
Bye
(Brunei) DPMM FC
Bye
Warriors FC
Bye
Home United
Bye

Quarter-finals
(Philippines) Global FC	0	4	4
Geylang International	1	1	2
(Japan) Albirex Niigata (S)	1	4	5
Balestier Khalsa	0	1	1
Tampines Rovers	1	1	2
(Brunei) DPMM FC	3	0	3
Warriors FC	1	0	1
Home United	2	2	4

Semi-finals
(Philippines) Global FC	0	1	1
(Japan) Albirex Niigata (S)	1	2	3
(Brunei) DPMM FC	3	0	3
Home United	2	2	4

Final
(Japan) Albirex Niigata (S)	2
Home United	1
Third place playoff
(Philippines) Global FC	1
(Brunei) DPMM FC	3

=== Preliminary round ===
The draw for the preliminary round was held on 17 April 2015 at the Ocean Financial Centre's Event Plaza. Six teams involved in this round will play in a single leg knockout basis. The matches will be played from 22 to 27 May 2015. Winners of this round will progress and advance to the quarter-finals.

22 May 2015	Albirex Niigata (S) (Japan)	2-1	(Cambodia) Svay Rieng	Jurong East Stadium
19:30	Ihata 19'; Kawata 69'	Report	Tani 26'	Referee: Ahmad A'Qashah

26 May 2015	Geylang International	2-1	(Laos) Lao Police Club	Bedok Stadium
19:30	Nor 69'; Kapláň 85' (pen.)	Report	Sivongthong 26'	Referee: W Ravisanthiran

27 May 2015	Hougang United	1-2 (a.e.t.)	(Philippines) Global FC	Hougang Stadium
19:30	Chupe 39'	Report	Suzuki 51' de Jong 103'

=== Quarter-finals ===
Albirex Niigata (S) and Geylang International will join five other teams in this round after winning their matches in the Preliminary Round . All matches will be played in a two-legged knockout basis. Away goal rule will not be applied in this tournament. Fixtures will be announced on a later date and winners of this round will progress and advance to the semi-finals.

Team 1	Agg.	Team 2	1st leg	2nd leg
Global FC (Philippines)	4-2	Geylang International	0-1	4-1
Albirex Niigata (S) (Japan)	5-1	Balestier Khalsa	1-0	4-1
Tampines Rovers	2-3	(Brunei) DPMM FC	1-3	1-0
Warriors FC	1-4	Home United	1-2	0-2

==== First leg ====
Global FC (Philippines)	0-1	Geylang International	Jalan Besar Stadium
		Kapláň 87'

Albirex Niigata (S) (Japan)	1-0	Balestier Khalsa	Jurong East Stadium
Nagasaki 45'

Tampines Rovers	1-3	(Brunei) DPMM FC	Jurong West Stadium
Pocuca 16'		McLean 5'; Ali Rahman 13'; Ramazotti 48'

Warriors FC	1-2	Home United	Choa Chu Kang Stadium
Ivančić 57'		Ilsø 55', 70'

==== Second leg ====
Geylang International	1-4 (a.e.t.)	(Philippines) Global FC	Bedok Stadium
Castanheria 76'		Hartmann 20', 102', 120'; Salenga 80'

Balestier Khalsa	1-4	(Japan) Albirex Niigata (S)	Toa Payoh Stadium
Pericic 90'		Kawata 19'; Rion 21'; Inaba 38'; Kumada 83'

DPMM FC (Brunei)	0-1	Tampines Rovers	Jalan Besar Stadium
		Mukhtar 90'

Home United	2-0	Warriors FC	Bishan Stadium
Begue 38'; Sahib 90'

=== Semi-finals ===
Team 1	Agg.	Team 2	1st leg	2nd leg
Global FC (Philippines)	1-3	(Japan) Albirex Niigata (S)	0-1	1-2
DPMM FC (Brunei)	3-4	Home United	3-2	0-2

==== First leg ====
Global FC (Philippines)	0-1	(Japan) Albirex Niigata (S)
		Rion 53'

DPMM FC (Brunei)	3-2	Home United
Sérgio 7'; Ali Rahman 63'; Ramazotti 86'		Sairudin 57'; Begue 58'

==== Second leg ====
Albirex Niigata (S) (Japan)	2-1	(Philippines) Global FC
Kawata 10'; Rion 82'		Hartmann 65'

Home United	2-0	(Brunei) DPMM FC
Sairudin 22'; Sahib 79'

=== Third/Fourth Placing ===
27 November 2015	Global FC (Philippines)	1–3	(Brunei) DPMM FC
17:00	Villanueva 48'		Azam 29'; Sérgio 43' (pen.); Raspudić 64'

=== Final ===
27 November 2015	Albirex Niigata (S) (Japan)	2–1	Home United
20:00	Rion 78'; Nagasaki 87'		Qaiyyim 72'	Referee: Ahmad A'Qashah Al Badowe

== Statistics ==
=== Goalscorers ===
Rank	Player	Club	Goals
1	(Japan) Rion Taki	Albirex Niigata (S)	4
2	(Philippines) Mark Hartmann	Global FC	3
2	(Japan) Atsushi Kawata	Albirex Niigata (S)	3
4	(Japan) Kento Nagasaki	Albirex Niigata (S)	2
4	(Brunei) Azwan Ali Rahman	DPMM FC	2
4	(Portugal) Paulo Sérgio	DPMM FC	2
4	(Brazil) Rafael Ramazotti	DPMM FC	2
4	(Slovakia) Jozef Kapláň	Geylang International	2
4	(France) Ambroise Begue	Home United	2
4	Azhar Sairudin	Home United	2
4	Imran Sahib	Home United	2
4	(Denmark) Ken Ilsø	Home United	2
13	21 players		1
