= Kento Nagasaki =

Japanese footballer

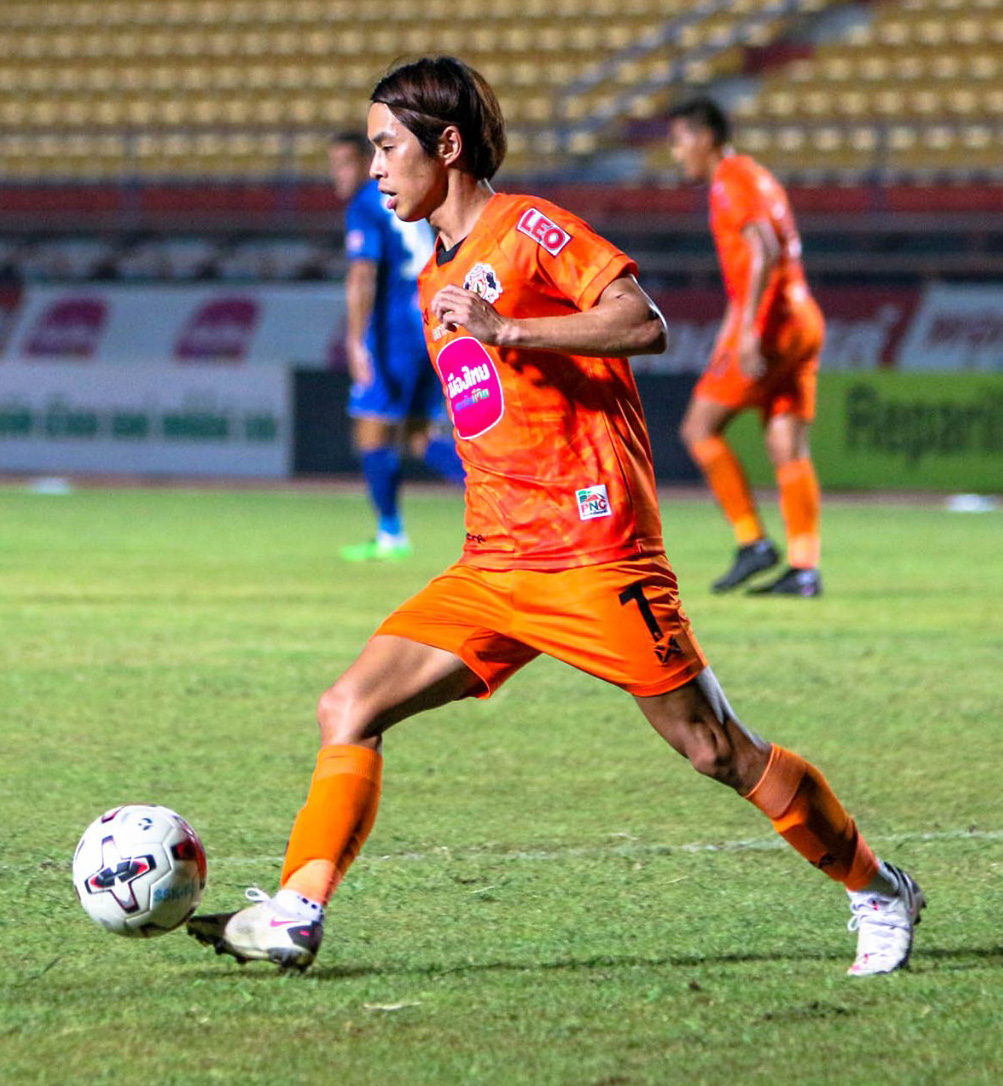
- Kento Nagasaki playing for Sisaket in a Thai League 2 match against Navy FC on 27 February 2021.

Personal information
- Date of birth: June 5, 1990 (age 36)
- Place of birth: Kanagawa, Japan
- Height: 1.68 m (5 ft 6 in)
- Position: Midfielder

Team information
- Current team: Phrae United

Youth career
- Shizuoka Gakuen High School
- Shizuoka Sangyo University

Senior career*
Years	Team	Apps	(Gls)
2013–2017	Albirex Niigata (S)	130	(26)
2018–2019	Thai Honda	61	(18)
2020–2021	Sisaket	29	(5)
2021	Singha Golden Bells Kanchanaburi	9	(2)
2021–2022	Muangkan United	12	(5)
2022–2023	Uthai Thani	38	(5)
2023–2024	Nongbua Pitchaya	33	(2)
2024–2025	Nakhon Si United	29	(3)
2025–2026	Nongbua Pitchaya	37	(1)
2026–	Phrae United	0	(0)
- * Club domestic league appearances and goals as of 26 April 2025 (UTC)

Kento Nagasaki (長崎 健人, Nagasaki Kento; born June 5, 1990) is a Japanese footballer who plays as a midfielder. He currently plays for Phrae United in Thai League 2.

Kento has spent most of his playing career playing for clubs in Singapore and Thailand.

== Club career ==
Kento studied at and played for Shizuoka Gakuen High School and Shizuoka Sangyo University.

=== Albirex Niigata Singapore ===
After graduating from the university, Kento signed for S.League club, Albirex Niigata (S) from for the 2013 season. In his time in Singapore, he helped the club to win 2 league titles, 3 Singapore Cup, 3 Singapore League Cup, 2 Singapore Community Shield and winning the 2017 S.League Player of the Year in his final year at the club in which he was the longest serving player in the club history and being both the club all time highest appearances and top score respectively.

=== Thai Honda ===
After five seasons at Albirex Niigata (S), Kento joined Thai League 2 side, Thai Honda, in 2018.

=== Sisaket ===
In 2020, Kento joined Sisaket in eastern Thailand playing in the Thai League 2. On 4 October 2020, he scored his first ever career hat-trick in a league match against Navy FC in a 4–2 away win.

=== Singha Golden Bells Kanchanaburi ===
On 27 August 2021, Kento joined newly revamp Thai League 3 club, Singha Golden Bells Kanchanaburi for the 2021–22 season but his career was cut short at the club.

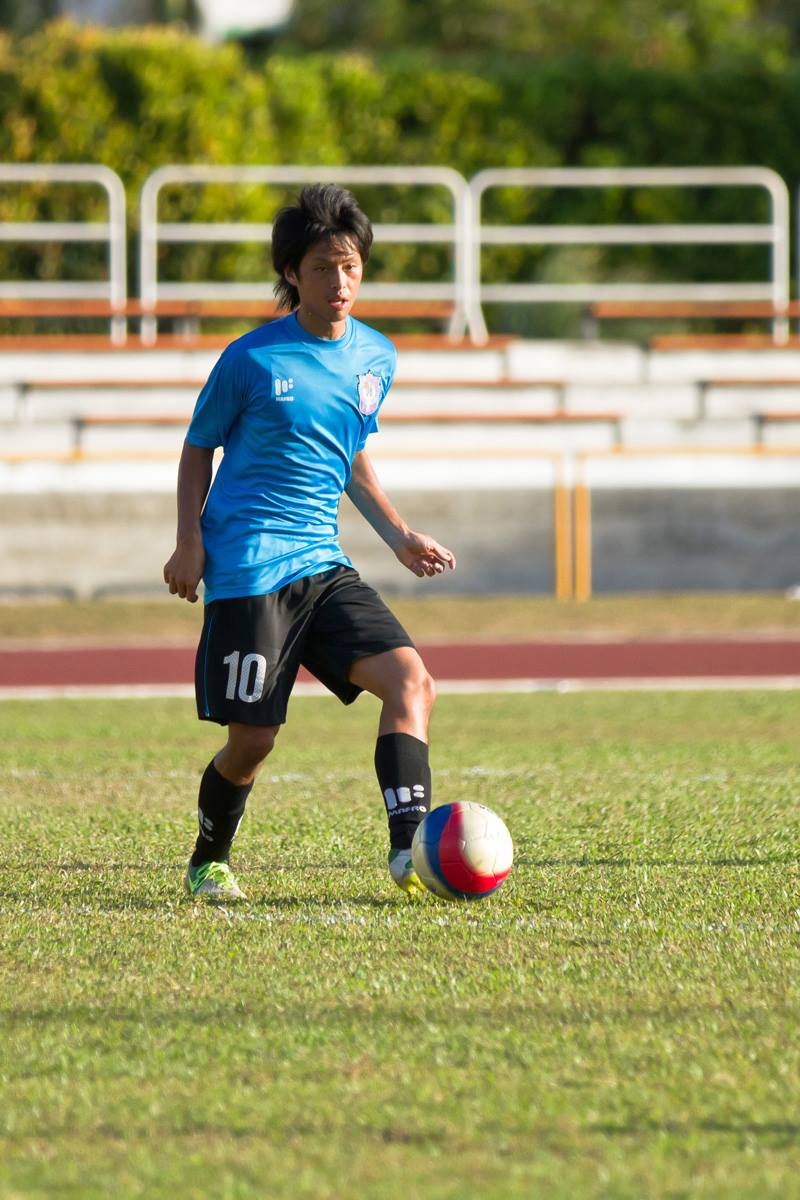
Kento Nagasaki playing in a pre-season training match against Woodlands Wellington at the Woodlands Stadium on 29 January 2014.

=== Muangkan United ===
On 20 December 2021, Kento joined Thai League 2 side, Muangkan United. On 9 January 2022, he scored in his debut game for the club against Rayong FC in a 3–1 win. Kento forms blooms as he went on to score 2 goals and getting 1 assists in the next home league fixtures against Udon Thani.

=== Uthai Thani ===
On 2 July 2022, Kento joined Uthai Thani for the 2022–23 Thai League 2 season. On 14 August 2022, he scored in his debut game for the club in a league match against Udon Thani.

=== Nongbua Pitchaya ===
On 4 July 2023, Kento joined recently relegated Thai League 1 club, Nongbua Pitchaya for the 2023–24 Thai League 2 season.

== Club career statistics ==
As of 29 February 2020

Club performance			League		Cup		League Cup		Total	
Season	Club	League	Apps	Goals	Apps	Goals	Apps	Goals	Apps	Goals
			League		Singapore Cup		League Cup		Total	
2013	Albirex Niigata (S)	S.League	27	6	1	1	4	0	32	7
2014	Albirex Niigata (S)	S.League	27	5	3	0	2	0	32	5
2015	Albirex Niigata (S)	S.League	25	2	5	2	4	3	34	7
2016	Albirex Niigata (S)	S.League	23	6	5	1	4	0	32	7
2017	Albirex Niigata (S)	S.League	24	11	5	5	5	1	34	17
Total			126	30	19	9	19	4	164	43
			League		Thai FA Cup		League Cup		Total	
2018	Thai Honda	Thai League 2	24	7	0	0	0	0	24	7
2019	Thai Honda	Thai League 2	34	10	5	2	1	0	40	12
Total			58	17	5	2	0	0	64	19
2020	Sisaket F.C.	Thai League 2	4	?	?	?	?	?	4	?
Total			4	0	0	0	0	0	4	0
2021-22	Kanchanaburi F.C.	Thai League 3	?	0	1	?	?	?	1	?
Total			?	?	1	0	0	0	1	?
2021-22	Muangkan United F.C.	Thai League 2	12	5	?	?	?	?	12	5
Total			12	5	0	0	0	0	12	5
2022-23	Uthai Thani F.C.	Thai League 2	34	5	3	1	2	0	39	6
Total			34	5	3	1	2	0	39	6
2023-24	Nongbua Pitchaya F.C.	Thai League 2	33	2	1	0	1	0	35	2
Total			33	2	1	0	1	0	35	2
Career total			158	32	20	8	20	4	199	45

== Honours ==
- Singapore Premier League
  - Champions (2: 2016, 2017
- Singapore Cup
  - Champions (3): 2015, 2016, 2017
- Singapore League Cup
  - Champions (3): 2015, 2016, 2017
- Singapore Community Shield
  - Champions (2): 2016, 2017

Individual

- S.League Player of the Year: 2017
