= Atsushi Kawata =

Japanese footballer

Atsushi Kawata 河田 篤秀
Personal information
- Full name: Atsushi Kawata
- Date of birth: September 18, 1992 (age 34)
- Place of birth: Fujiidera, Osaka, Japan
- Height: 1.77 m (5 ft 10 in)
- Position: Forward

Team information
- Current team: Kochi United SC
- Number: 13

Youth career
- Miharadai FC
- –2004: Izumi FC
- 2005–2007: Cerezo Osaka
- 2009–2010: Hannan University High School

College career
Years	Team	Apps	(Gls)
2011–2014	Hannan University		

Senior career*
Years	Team	Apps	(Gls)
2015–2016	Albirex Niigata (S)	43	(19)
2017–2018	Albirex Niigata	50	(12)
2019–2021	Tokushima Vortis	86	(23)
2021–2023	Omiya Ardija	63	(14)
2023–24	Sagan Tosu	31	(3)
2024-2025	Thespa Gunma	37	(4)
2026-	Kochi United SC	11	(2)
- * Club domestic league appearances and goals as of 21 August 2026

Atsushi Kawata (河田 篤秀, Kawata Atsushi; born September 18, 1992) is a Japanese professional footballer who plays as a forward for J3 League club Kochi United SC.

During his time at Albirex Niigata (S), Kawata led the White Swans to being the first club in Singapore football history to achieve all the unprecedented sweep of all four of the league's major trophies, the 2016 S.League, 2016 Singapore Cup, 2016 Singapore League Cup and the 2016 Singapore Community Shield which led him to won the 2016 S.League Player Of The Year.

== Club career ==
=== Albirex Niigata (Singapore) ===
Atsushi Kawata signed for Albirex Niigata (S) for the 2015 S.League season. He made 30 appearances, scoring 11 goals in all competitions that season. He renewed his contract with the club for the 2016 S.League season. He was also part of the Albirex Niigata (S) squad that won both the 2015 Singapore Cup and the 2015 Singapore League Cup.

In the 2016 S.League season, Kawata was part of the team which completed an unprecedented sweep of all four of the league's major trophies. As a result, he was named the 2016 S.League Player of the Year, scoring 20 goals and contributing 8 assists in all competitions.

=== Albirex Niigata ===
After a stellar 2016 season in Singapore, Kawata earned a move back to parent club, Albirex Niigata for the 2017 J1 League season.

He scored his first goal for the club against Hokkaido Consadole Sapporo on 23 September 2017. In the match, he scored twice and this was the first time he started a match for the team. He also scored on 21 October 2017 against Júbilo Iwata.

=== Tokushima Vortis ===
On 6 January 2019, Kawata moved to J2 League club, Tokushima Vortis. On 8 June 2019, he scored his first goal for the club against Machida Zelvia scoring the only goal in the match. On 24 August 2019, Kawata scored a 7-minute hat-trick in a league match against FC Ryukyu which resulted in a 6–1 win. He ended the 2019 season with 33 appearances scoring 14 goals and contributing 4 assists in all competitions.

Kawata was featured more often in the 2020 J2 League season where he would go on to make 39 appearances and scoring 9 goals in all competitions. Despite he scoring much lesser than the previous season, Kawata would go on to help Tokushima Vortis become the 2022 J2 League Champions thus promoting them to the top tier of the Japan football division, the J1 League. He also helped them to a semi-finals cup run in the 2020 Emperor's Cup which they lost 2–0 to Gamba Osaka.

Kawata goes on to have a bad start playing in the 2021 J1 League where he found himself scoring 1 goal in 24 matches. Midway throughout the season, Tokushima Vortis announced that will leave the club to venture for new challenges. In his time with Tokushima Vortis, he had played over 94 matches scoring 24 goals and contributing 4 assists in all competitions with the club.

=== Omiya Ardija ===
On 21 July 2021, Kawata joined J2 League club, Omiya Ardija on a permanent deal. On 9 August 2021, he make his debut for the club against his former club, Albirex Niigata in a 2–2 draw. In the next game, he went on to score his first goal for the club against Blaublitz Akita. He went on to finished the season finding his form scoring 7 goals in 19 appearances for the club. He went on to make 64 appearances scoring 14 goals and contributing 3 assists in all competitions in his 2 years stay at Omiya Ardija.

=== Sagan Tosu ===
On 28 March 2023, Kawata find himself transferring to J1 League club, Sagan Tosu donning the no.9 jersey which was previously worn by former 2010 FIFA World Cup winner, Fernando Torres. On 1 April 2023, he made his debut for the club in a match against FC Tokyo where he would go on to grab a win at the last kick of the game scoring in the 90+5 injury time from Jakub Slowik error.

== Career statistics ==
As of 13 August 2023.

Singapore
Club	Season	League			Singapore Cup		Singapore League Cup		Total	
Club	Season	Division	Apps	Goals	Apps	Goals	Apps	Goals	Apps	Goals
Albirex Niigata (S)	2015	S.League	21	6	4	2	5	3	30	11
Albirex Niigata (S)	2016	S.League	22	13	4	3	4	4	30	20
Albirex Niigata (S)	Total		43	19	8	5	9	7	60	31
Japan
Club	Season	League			Emperor's Cup		J.League Cup		Total	
Club	Season	Division	Apps	Goals	Apps	Goals	Apps	Goals	Apps	Goals
Albirex Niigata	2017	J1 League	11	3	0	0	2	0	13	3
Albirex Niigata	2018	J2 League	39	9	2	0	0	0	41	9
Albirex Niigata	Total		50	12	2	0	2	0	54	12
Tokushima Vortis	2019	J2 League	33 (Note: Includes J1/J2 promotion play-offs)	14	0	0	–		33	14
Tokushima Vortis	2020	J2 League	37	9	2	0	–		39	9
Tokushima Vortis	2021	J1 League	16	0	1	0	6	1	23	1
Tokushima Vortis	Total		86	23	3	0	6	1	95	24
Omiya Ardija	2021	J2 League	19	7	0	0	–		19	7
Omiya Ardija	2022	J2 League	40	7	0	0	–		40	7
Omiya Ardija	2023	J2 League	4	0	0	0	–		4	0
Omiya Ardija	Total		63	14	0	0	0	0	63	14
Sagan Tosu	2023	J1 League	15	2	2	0	4	0	21	2
Career total			258	70	15	5	21	8	294	83

== Honours ==
=== Club ===
Albirex Niigata (S)

- S.League: 2016
- Singapore Cup : 2015, 2016
- Singapore League Cup: 2015, 2016
- Singapore Charity Shield: 2016

==== Tokushima Vortis ====
- J2 League: 2020

=== Individual ===
- S.League Player of the Year: 2016
