= Takahiro Saito =

Japanese footballer

Personal information
- Date of birth: 21 November 1990 (age 35)
- Place of birth: Ibaraki, Japan
- Height: 1.83 m (6 ft 0 in)
- Position: Defender

Youth career
- Kashiwa High School

College career
Years	Team	Apps	(Gls)
- Ryutsu Keitai University

Senior career*
Years	Team	Apps	(Gls)
- Vonds Ichihara
2015–2016	Albirex Niigata S	27	(0)
2016–20??	Lao Toyota FC		
- * Club domestic league appearances and goals

Takahiro Saito (born 21 November 1990 in Ibaraki, Japan) is a Japanese professional footballer who is last known to have played for Lao Toyota FC of the Lao Premier League.

== Career ==
Recording 27 appearances for Albirex Niigata S in 2015, Saito then completed a transfer to perennial Lao Premier League title contenders Lao Toyota FC in 2016, thanking his teammates and staff for their support.

== Trophies ==
- Singapore Cup(1): 2015
- Singapore League Cup(1): 2015
