= Rion Taki =

Japanese footballer

Rion Taki 多木理音
Personal information
- Full name: Rion Taki
- Date of birth: June 6, 1992 (age 34)
- Place of birth: Kyoto, Japan
- Height: 1.86 m (6 ft 1 in)
- Position: Forward

Team information
- Current team: Matsue City FC
- Number: 4

Youth career
- Vissel Kobe
- 2011–2014: Hannan University

Senior career*
Years	Team	Apps	(Gls)
2015	Albirex Niigata	25	(6)
2016–2017	Bokelj	8	(0)
2017	Briobecca Urayasu	9	(2)
2018	ReinMeer Aomori	24	(4)
2019–	Matsue City FC	7	(0)
- * Club domestic league appearances and goals as of 11:28, 21 May 2019 (UTC)

Rion Taki (多木理音, Taki Rion; born June 6, 1992) is a Japanese football player for Matsue City FC.

== Career ==
After graduating at Hannan University, Taki opted to join Albirex Niigata Singapore FC and play abroad, also featuring in the Montenegrin championship with FK Bokelj. In Summer 2017, he came back to Japan to play for Briobecca Urayasu, just to stay in Japan Football League for 2018 season with ReinMeer Aomori.

In February 2019, Taki joined Matsue City FC.

== Club statistics ==
Updated to 28 August 2018.

Club performance			League		Cup		League Cup		Total	
Season	Club	League	Apps	Goals	Apps	Goals	Apps	Goals	Apps	Goals
Singapore			League		Cup		League Cup		Total	
2015	Albirex Niigata (S)	S.League	25	6	6	4	4	1	35	11
Montenegro			League		Cup		League Cup		Total	
2016–17	FK Bokelj	Prva CFL	8	0	0	0	–		8	0
Japan			League		Cup		League Cup		Total	
2017	Briobecca Urayasu	JFL	9	2	0	0	–		9	2
2018	ReinMeer Aomori	JFL	16	3	2	1	–		17	4
Total			58	11	8	5	4	1	70	17
