= Mustafić =

Origin
- Language: Bosnian
- Meaning: son of Mustafa
- Region of origin: Bosnia and Herzegovina

Mustafić is a patronymic Bosnian surname. People with the name include:

- Alen Mustafić (born 1999), Bosnian footballer
- Fahrudin Mustafić (born 1981), Singapore footballer of Bosnian descent
- Ibran Mustafić (born 1960), Bosnian politician
- Muhamed Mustafić (born 1981), Bosnian handballer
