= Mikiya Yamada =

Japanese footballer

Personal information
- Date of birth: November 7, 1992 (age 33)
- Place of birth: Osaka, Japan
- Height: 1.64 m (5 ft 4 1/2 in)
- Position: Defender

Team information
- Current team: Albirex Niigata FC (Singapore)

Youth career
- Gamba Osaka Youth
- Kansai University

Senior career*
Years	Team	Apps	(Gls)
2015 –	Albirex Niigata FC (Singapore)		
- * Club domestic league appearances and goals as of Jan 7, 2016

Mikiya Yamada (山田 幹也, Yamada Mikiya; born November 7, 1992 in Osaka, Japan) is a Japanese footballer. He is a defender.

He signed for Albirex Niigata (S) in 2015 after graduating from Kansai University. He subsequently renewed his contract in 2016. He has played in Australia.

== Club career statistics ==
As of Jan 2, 2017

Club performance			League		Cup		League Cup		Total	
Season	Club	League	Apps	Goals	Apps	Goals	Apps	Goals	Apps	Goals
Singapore			League		Singapore Cup		League Cup		Total	
2015	Albirex Niigata FC (S)	S.League	25	0	6	0	2	0	33	0
2016	Albirex Niigata FC (S)	S.League	21	1	4	0	5	0	30	1
2017	Albirex Niigata FC (S)	S.League	?	?	?	?	?	?	?	?
Total
Total	Singapore		46	1	10	0	7	0	63	1
Career total			46	1	10	0	7	0	63	1
