= Azhar Sairudin =

Singaporean footballer

Personal information
- Full name: Mohammad Azhar bin Sairudin
- Date of birth: 30 September 1986 (age 40)
- Place of birth: Singapore
- Height: 1.72 m (5 ft 7 1/2 in)
- Position: Attacking midfielder

Team information
- Current team: Geylang International
- Number: 8

Senior career*
| Years | Team | Apps | (Gls) |
| 2009–2010 | Home United | 14 | (2) |
| 2011–2014 | Hougang United | 94 | (6) |
| 2015–2016 | Home United | 33 | (6) |
| 2017 | Hougang United | 13 | (1) |
| 2018– | Geylang International | | |

International career^{‡}
| 2016– | Singapore | 2 | (0) |
- * Club domestic league appearances and goals as of 12:31, 29 May 2016 (UTC) ‡ National team caps and goals as of 11:18, 10 June 2016 (UTC)

Mohammad Azhar bin Sairudin (born 30 September 1986) is a Singapore professional footballer who currently plays as an attacking midfielder for S.League club Geylang International and the Singapore national football team.

== International career ==
On 28 May 2016, Azhar was called up to represent the Singapore national football team for the 2016 AYA Bank Cup. It was Azhar's first call-up to the national team, after former Singapore national team coach Bernd Stange was replaced by his assistant V. Sundramoorthy. On 3 June 2016, Azhar made his senior international debut against Myanmar in the 2016 AYA Bank Cup, playing 60 minutes before being substituted for Yasir Hanapi. The international cup fixture eventually ended in a 1–0 win for Singapore.

== Career statistics ==
=== Club ===
As of 02:22, 4 June 2016 (UTC)

| Club | Season | S.League | | Singapore Cup | | Singapore League Cup | | Asia | | Total | | Ref. |
| Club | Season | Apps | Goals | Apps | Goals | Apps | Goals | Apps | Goals | Apps | Goals | |
|---|---|---|---|---|---|---|---|---|---|---|---|---|
| Home United | 2009 | 11 | 1 | 0 | 0 | 0 | 0 | — | | 11 | 1 | |
| Home United | 2010 | 3 | 1 | 0 | 0 | 1 | 0 | — | | 4 | 1 | |
| Home United | Total | 14 | 2 | 0 | 0 | 1 | 0 | 0 | 0 | 15 | 2 | |
| Hougang United | 2011 | 29 | 1 | 4 | 0 | 3 | 0 | — | | 36 | 1 | |
| Hougang United | 2012 | 21 | 2 | 3 | 0 | 3 | 1 | — | | 27 | 3 | |
| Hougang United | 2013 | 25 | 4 | 3 | 0 | 3 | 0 | — | | 31 | 4 | |
| Hougang United | 2014 | 19 | 0 | 1 | 0 | 4 | 0 | — | | 24 | 0 | |
| Hougang United | Total | 94 | 6 | 10 | 0 | 13 | 1 | 0 | 0 | 117 | 7 | |
| Home United | 2015 | 22 | 3 | 5 | 2 | 2 | 2 | — | | 29 | 7 | |
| Home United | 2016 | 11 | 3 | 1 | 1 | 0 | 0 | — | | 12 | 4 | |
| Home United | Total | 33 | 6 | 6 | 3 | 2 | 2 | 0 | 0 | 41 | 11 | |
| Hougang United | 2017 | 16 | 2 | 2 | 0 | 2 | 0 | — | | 20 | 2 | |
| Hougang United | Total | 16 | 2 | 2 | 0 | 2 | 0 | 0 | 0 | 20 | 2 | |
| Geylang International | 2018 | 22 | 1 | 2 | 0 | 0 | 0 | — | | 24 | 1 | |
| Geylang International | Total | 22 | 1 | 2 | 0 | 0 | 0 | 0 | 0 | 24 | 1 | |
| Career total | | 179 | 17 | 20 | 3 | 18 | 3 | 0 | 0 | 217 | 23 | |

=== International ===
As of 11:18, 10 June 2016 (UTC)

Singapore national team
| Year | Apps | Goals | Ref. |
|---|---|---|---|
| 2016 | 2 | 0 | |

== Honours ==
- Singapore League Cup
  - Winner: 2009
  - Runner-up: 2011
- Singapore Cup
  - Runner-up: 2015
- S.League Player of the Month (1)
  - August 2015

== Personal life ==
Azhar is the eldest child in his family, with a total of seven other siblings. In 2015, Azhar's younger sibling, Aqil Sairudin, died in a motorcycle accident on the Seletar Expressway in Singapore. Another sibling of Azhar, Azreen Sairudin, suffered multiple injuries from the accident as well, but subsequently recovered. Home United.
