= Azman Ilham Noor =

Bruneian footballer

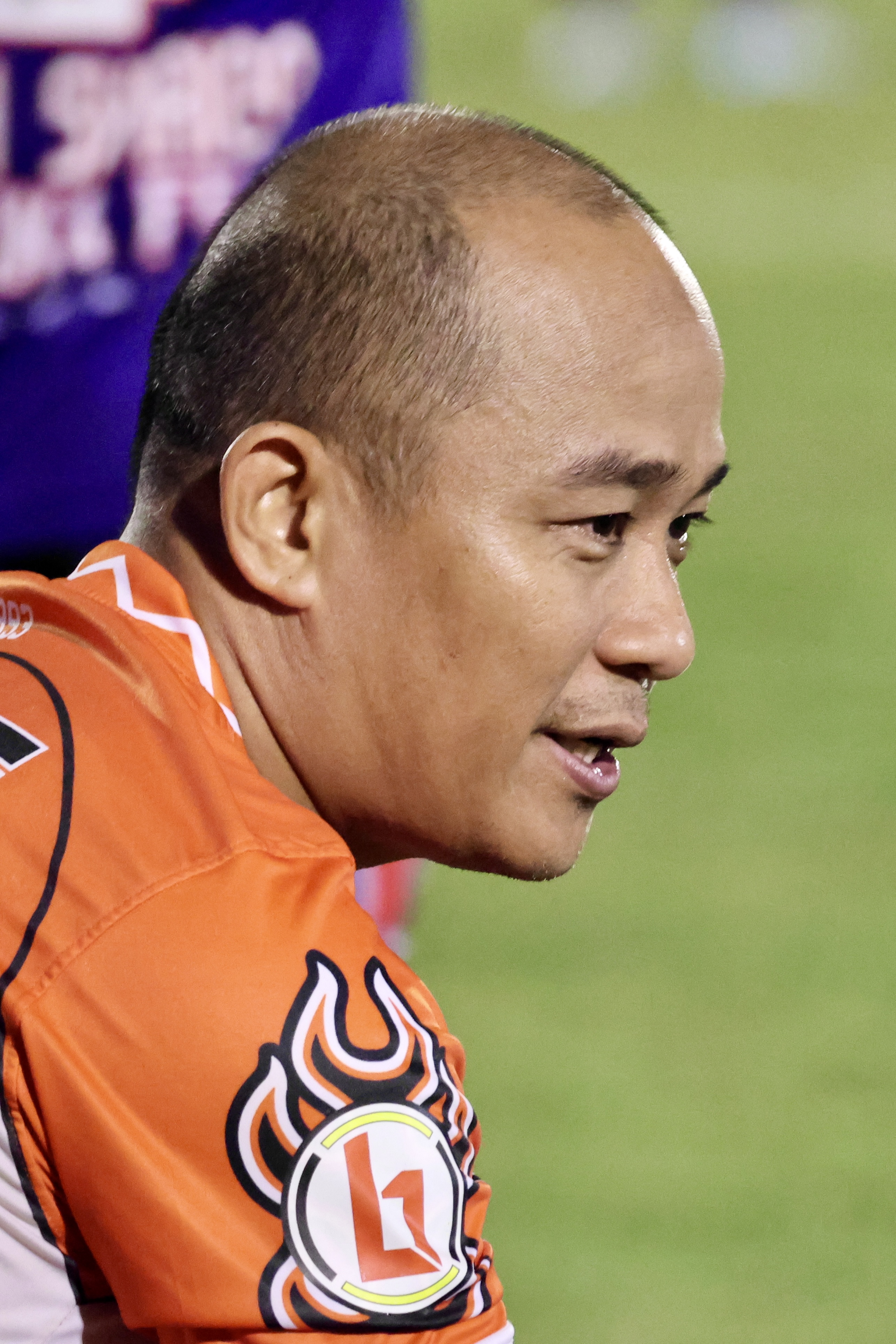
- Azman with Kasuka in 2024

Personal information
- Full name: Azman Ilham bin Haji Mohamed Noor
- Date of birth: 17 February 1984 (age 42)
- Place of birth: Rambai, Brunei
- Height: 1.80 m (5 ft 11 in)
- Position: Goalkeeper

Team information
- Current team: Kasuka FC
- Number: 18

Youth career
- 2000–2003: DPMM

Senior career*
Years	Team	Apps	(Gls)
2004–2008	QAF		
2008–2009	NBT		
2009–2016	DPMM	6	(0)
2010–2011	→ KKSJ Penjara (loan)		
2017–2021	Kota Ranger		
2022–	Kasuka	11	(0)

International career^{‡}
2005–2014	Brunei U21	2+	(0)
2006–2014	Brunei	9	(0)
- * Club domestic league appearances and goals as of 11 December 2025 ‡ National team caps and goals as of 12 July 2017

Azman Ilham bin Haji Mohamed Noor (born 17 February 1984) is a Bruneian footballer who plays as a goalkeeper for Kasuka FC of the Brunei Super League.

Azman played for QAF FC and NBT FC before signing for Brunei's only professional club, DPMM FC to serve as backup to Wardun Yussof. He was loaned to the Prisons Department football team for the duration of the FIFA suspension of Brunei. He was released at the end of the 2016 season.

== International career ==
He has played for the national team since 2006, and was called up for the 2014 AFF Suzuki Cup qualification. He was also selected for the 2014 Hassanal Bolkiah Trophy as one of the five permitted overage players.

== Honours ==
=== Team ===
DPMM FC

- S.League: 2015
- Singapore League Cup (3): 2009, 2012, 2014

Kota Ranger FC

- Brunei FA Cup: 2018–19
- Piala Sumbangsih: 2020

Kasuka FC

- Brunei Super League (2): 2023, 2024–25

=== Individual ===
- 2024–25 Brunei Super League Best Goalkeeper of the Season
