= Paulo Sérgio (footballer, born 1984) =

Portuguese footballer

Personal information
- Full name: Paulo Sérgio Moreira Gonçalves
- Date of birth: 24 January 1984 (age 42)
- Place of birth: Lisbon, Portugal
- Height: 1.65 m (5 ft 5 in)
- Positions: Attacking midfielder; winger

Youth career
- 1994–1995: Benfica
- 1996–1997: Vitória Lisboa
- 1997–1999: Oriental
- 1999–2002: Sporting CP

Senior career*
Years	Team	Apps	(Gls)
2002–2003	Sporting CP B	33	(5)
2003–2008	Sporting CP	0	(0)
2004	→ Académica (loan)	16	(3)
2005–2006	→ Belenenses (loan)	45	(2)
2006	→ Estrela Amadora (loan)	7	(1)
2007	→ Aves (loan)	14	(3)
2007–2008	→ Portimonense (loan)	26	(2)
2008–2009	Salamanca	20	(1)
2009–2011	Olhanense	44	(2)
2011–2012	Vitória Guimarães	18	(0)
2012–2013	AEL Limassol	27	(6)
2013–2014	Arouca	6	(0)
2014	Olhanense	12	(2)
2015–2016	DPMM	39	(18)
2017–2018	Bhayangkara	59	(19)
2019–2020	Bali United	27	(2)
Total		393	(66)

International career
2002	Portugal U18	2	(1)
2002–2003	Portugal U19	15	(8)
2004	Portugal U20	5	(0)
2004–2005	Portugal U21	11	(4)
2005	Portugal B	2	(0)
- * Club domestic league appearances and goals

Paulo Sérgio Moreira Gonçalves (born 24 January 1984), known as Paulo Sérgio, is a Portuguese former footballer who played as an attacking midfielder or right winger.

He amassed Primeira Liga totals of 162 matches and 13 goals over eight seasons, appearing in the competition for Académica, Belenenses, Estrela da Amadora, Aves, Olhanense, Vitória de Guimarães and Arouca. He also played professionally in Spain, Cyprus, Singapore and Indonesia, winning the Singapore Premier League with DPMM and repeating the feat in Liga 1 with Bhayangkara and Bali United.

Paulo Sérgio finished second at the 2003 European Under-19 Championship with Portugal, being the tournament's top scorer.

== Club career ==
Born in Lisbon, Paulo Sérgio started his career at local Sporting CP, but never appeared in the Primeira Liga with the first team. In April 2003, 10% of his economic rights were sold to an investment fund along with other youth products, and he would be loaned several times in the following years, for example spending two seasons with Lisbon neighbours Belenenses; on 25 November 2004, before leaving for the latter club, he appeared for the Lions in a 4–0 win at Dinamo Tbilisi in that season's UEFA Cup, coming on as a substitute for Roudolphe Douala in the 65th minute.

After one season with Portimonense of the Segunda Liga, Paulo Sérgio was released by Sporting and signed for Spanish side Salamanca. He appeared in roughly half of the games during the campaign, as the Castile and León team finished ninth in the Segunda División.

Paulo Sérgio returned to his country and Algarve in summer 2009, joining Olhanense who had just promoted to the top flight and being regularly played over the course of two seasons as the club managed to consecutively retain its status. On 17 September 2010, he scored in the 2–0 home victory over his former employers Portimonense, the first of two official goals during his tenure.

In the following years, Paulo Sérgio represented in quick succession Vitória de Guimarães, Cyprus' AEL Limassol, Arouca and Olhanense. In March 2015, after spending the first part of the campaign as a free agent, he joined DPMM of the Singapore Premier League, replacing injured Craig Fagan. He scored a brace on his debut on 4 April, helping to a 3–2 away defeat of Hougang United.

Paulo Sérgio netted twice in the 4–0 win over Balestier Khalsa in the final league game of 2015, and his team won their first-ever national championship.

== International career ==
Paulo Sérgio played seven times in the 2006 UEFA European Under-21 Championship qualification, netting four goals. He was not, however, selected for the squad that appeared in the final tournament, which was held on home soil.

Previously, Paulo Sérgio appeared with the under-19s in the 2003 European Championship in Liechtenstein, scoring five times in as many matches as the national team lost in the final against Italy.

== Career statistics ==
Club	Season	League			Cup		Other		Total	
Club	Season	Division	Apps	Goals	Apps	Goals	Apps	Goals	Apps	Goals
Sporting CP B	2002–03	Segunda Divisão	25	4	—		—		25	4
Sporting CP B	2003–04	Segunda Divisão	8	1	—		—		8	1
Sporting CP B	Total		33	5	—		—		33	5
Sporting CP	2003–04	Primeira Liga	0	0	1	0	0	0	1	0
Sporting CP	2004–05	Primeira Liga	0	0	0	0	1 (Note: Appearance in UEFA Cup)	0	1	0
Sporting CP	Total		0	0	1	0	1	0	2	0
Académica (loan)	2003–04	Primeira Liga	16	3	0	0	—		16	3
Belenenses (loan)	2004–05	Primeira Liga	19	2	0	0	—		19	2
Belenenses (loan)	2005–06	Primeira Liga	26	0	1	0	—		27	0
Belenenses (loan)	Total		45	2	1	0	—		46	2
Estrela Amadora (loan)	2006–07	Primeira Liga	7	1	1	0	—		8	1
Aves (loan)	2006–07	Primeira Liga	14	3	0	0	—		14	3
Portimonense (loan)	2007–08	Segunda Liga	26	2	5	1	—		31	3
Salamanca	2008–09	Segunda División	20	1	1	0	—		21	1
Olhanense	2009–10	Primeira Liga	20	0	1	0	—		21	0
Olhanense	2010–11	Primeira Liga	24	2	4	0	—		28	2
Olhanense	Total		44	2	5	0	—		49	2
Vitória Guimarães	2011–12	Primeira Liga	18	0	3	0	1 (Note: Appearance in UEFA Europa League)	0	22	0
AEL Limassol	2012–13	Cypriot First Division	27	6	7	1	9 (Note: Appearances in UEFA Europa League and UEFA Champions League)	0	43	7
Arouca	2013–14	Primeira Liga	6	0	3	0	—		9	0
Olhanense	2014–15	Segunda Liga	12	2	0	0	—		12	2
DPMM	2015	Singapore Premier League	20	12	4	2	3 (Note: Appearances in Singapore League Cup)	2	27	16
DPMM	2016	Singapore Premier League	19	6	1	0	3	3	23	9
DPMM	Total		39	18	5	2	6	5	50	25
Bhayangkara	2017	Liga 1	29	9	—		—		29	9
Bhayangkara	2018	Liga 1	30	10	1	1	3 (Note: Appearances in Piala Presiden)	0	34	11
Bhayangkara	Total		59	19	1	1	3	0	63	20
Bali United	2019	Liga 1	26	2	4	0	3	0	33	2
Bali United	2020	Liga 1	1	0	—		—		1	0
Bali United	Total		27	2	4	0	3	0	34	2
Career total			393	66	37	5	23	5	453	76

== Honours ==
AEL Limassol

- Cypriot Cup runner-up: 2012–13
- Cypriot Super Cup runner-up: 2012

DPMM

- Singapore Premier League: 2015
- Singapore Community Shield runner-up: 2016

Bhayangkara

- Liga 1: 2017

Bali United

- Liga 1: 2019

Portugal U19

- UEFA European Under-19 Championship runner-up: 2003

Individual

- UEFA European Under-19 Championship top scorer: 2003
- Liga 1 Best Player: 2017
- Liga 1 Best XI: 2017, 2019
