= Billy Mehmet =

Footballer (born 1984)

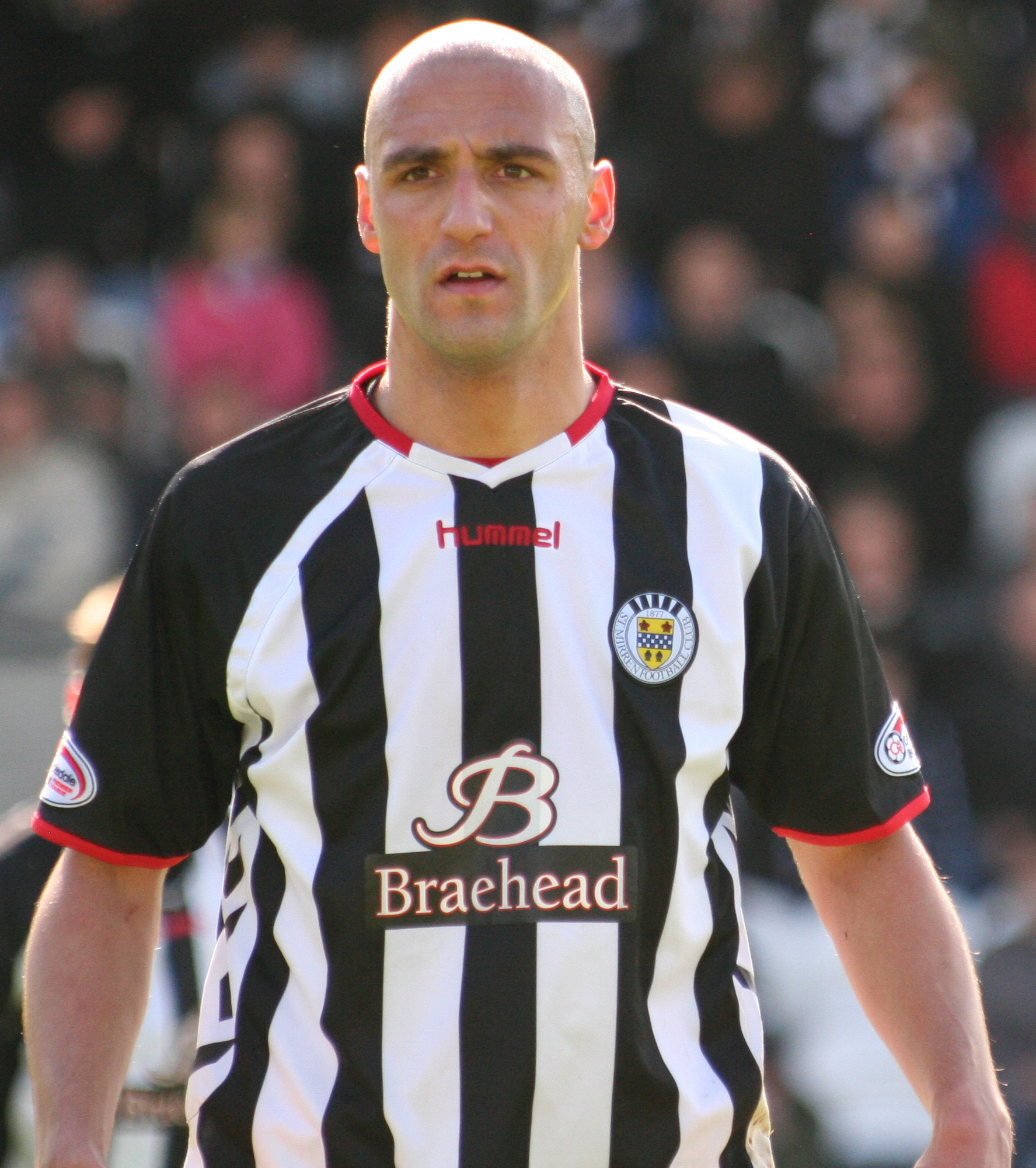
- Mehmet with St Mirren in 2009

Personal information
- Full name: Billy Osman Mehmet
- Date of birth: 3 January 1984 (age 42)
- Place of birth: London, England
- Position: Striker

Youth career
- 1991–2003: West Ham United

Senior career*
| Years | Team | Apps | (Gls) |
| 2003–2005 | Dunfermline Athletic | 49 | (3) |
| 2005–2010 | St Mirren | 161 | (20) |
| 2010–2011 | Gençlerbirliği | 14 | (2) |
| 2011–2012 | Samsunspor | 11 | (2) |
| 2012–2013 | Perth Glory | 38 | (9) |
| 2013 | Bangkok Glass | 3 | (0) |
| 2013 | Dempo | 8 | (1) |
| 2014 | Kedah FA | 26 | (25) |
| 2015 | Sarawak FA | 25 | (23) |
| 2016 | Tampines Rovers | 22 | (12) |
| 2017 | DPMM | 8 | (2) |
| 2017– | Merit Alsancak Yeşilova | 201 | (41) |

International career^{‡}
| 2003–2005 | Republic of Ireland U21 | 6 | (1) |
| 2018 | Northern Cyprus | 5 | (4) |
- * Club domestic league appearances and goals as of 08:38, 19 June 2025 (UTC) ‡ National team caps and goals as of 9 June 2018

Billy Mehmet (born 3 January 1984) is a professional footballer who plays as a striker and currently captains Alsancak Yeşilova SK in the KTFF Süper Lig. Born in England, Mehmet represented the England national football team at schoolboy level and trained at the Lilleshall National Sports Centre, which at the time served as England's elite youth development base. He later represented the Republic of Ireland national under-21 football team and the Northern Cyprus national football team at senior level.

Mehmet came through the youth system at West Ham United F.C., having joined the academy at the age of eight. He spent eleven years at the club before moving to the Scottish Premier League at 19, where he played for Dunfermline Athletic F.C. and St Mirren F.C. over a seven-year period.

Following his time in Scotland, Mehmet signed for Gençlerbirliği S.K. and later Samsunspor in the Turkish Süper Lig. He then moved to Australia, where he spent two seasons with Perth Glory in the A-League. His career later took him to Southeast Asia, beginning with a move to Bangkok Glass F.C. in the Thai Premier League for a reported fee of $2.5 million.

In 2014, Mehmet joined Kedah FA in the Malaysia Premier League, finishing as the top scorer in all competitions with 23 goals in 26 appearances. He continued his prolific form the following year with Sarawak FA in the Malaysia Super League, where he was the club's top scorer and finished third in the league's overall scoring charts.

He later moved to the Singapore Premier League with Tampines Rovers FC, where he was again the club's top goal scorer and played as a marquee signing alongside former Arsenal F.C. winger Jermaine Pennant. Mehmet went on to have a short spell with DPMM FC of Brunei, after being signed by former Blackburn Rovers F.C. manager Steve Kean.

In 2017, Mehmet joined the KTFF Süper Lig, signing as a marquee player for Alsancak Yeşilova SK. He played alongside several high-profile teammates, including former Newcastle United F.C. forward Lomana LuaLua.

== Club career ==
=== Early career ===
Mehmet began his career with West Ham United where he was captain of The Academy of Football. As a youngster Mehmet was offered deals with Norwich, Arsenal, Millwall and Crystal Palace but decided to stay with West Ham United.

He transferred to Dunfermline Athletic on 8 May 2003. He was an unused substitute in the 2004 Scottish Cup Final against Celtic, Dunfermline losing 3–1. In 2005, he transferred to St Mirren.

=== St Mirren ===
In his first season, Mehmet helped St Mirren win the Scottish First Division and gain promotion to the Scottish Premier League, scoring the winning goal in a 2–1 win over Dundee which clinched the league. He scored the goals that kept St Mirren in the SPL in 2007–08 and 2008–09. In 2007–08 season, Mehmet started to play more and was Saints' top scorer in 2007–08 with nine goals, 2008–09 with 11 goals and 2009–10 with 13 goals. In February 2008, Mehmet extended his contract with St Mirren to 2010. He scored his first ever hat-trick in a Scottish League Cup win against Dumbarton. On 7 March 2009, Mehmet scored the only goal in a 1–0 win at St Mirren Park, converting a penalty to knock Celtic out of the Scottish Cup, and sending the Paisley club into the semi-finals of the tournament. The victory came after St Mirren lost 7–0 to Celtic in the Scottish Premier League meeting at Parkhead the week before. In August 2009, Mehmet scored five of St Mirren's six goals in a 6–3 League Cup victory over East Stirlingshire. On 2 February 2010, Mehmet booked Saints a place in the League Cup Final after his strike was enough to secure a semi-final victory over Hearts, they lost 1–0 in the final against Rangers.

=== Gençlerbirliği ===
On 10 May 2010, it was confirmed that Mehmet had signed for Turkish side Gençlerbirliği on a two-year deal with a one-year option to extend his stay. However, in February 2011 Mehmet mutually agreed to terminate his contract with Gençlerbirliği due to financial issues affecting the club. He made 19 appearances, scoring four times for the club.

=== Samsunspor ===
In March 2011, Mehmet signed for Turkish side Samsunspor, dropping down to the Bank Asya Lig 1, the second level of Turkish football, due to a clause in his contract that didn't allow him to play for another Super Lig team for one season. Mehmet helped Samsunspor to second place in the Bank Asya Lig 1 title in August 2011 which saw Samsunspor promoted to the Turkish Super Lig. He score thrice in 12 league appearances for the club.

=== Perth Glory ===
On 5 September 2011 it was announced Mehmet had signed with A-League club Perth Glory. After an impressive pre-season, Mehmet scored the lone goal in Perth's 1–0 defeat of Adelaide United in the opening round game in Perth. He went to make 29 league appearances that season, scoring eight goals, and helped Perth Glory to second place in the league.

=== Bangkok Glass ===
On 18 January 2013, Mehmet terminated his contract with Perth Glory in the A-League after agreeing to sign with Thai Premier League side Bangkok Glass. Billy Mehmet scored in his first pre-season match for Bangkok Glass vs Singapore Armed Forces in a 3–1 victory at the Leo Stadium. Mehmet made his league debut for Bangkok Glass on 3 February 2013, losing 1–0 to Songkhla United.

After making only seven league appearances and scoring once, Mehmet and Bangkok Glass agreed to mutually terminate Mehmet's contract on 13 June 2013 for personal reasons.

=== Dempo ===
Not long after leaving Bangkok, Mehmet was snapped up by Indian club Dempo. The Panaji based club from the I-League (India's top flight) announced his signing on 10 July. Mehmet made his debut for Dempo on 22 July 2013, in a 3–0 away defeat to Shillong Lajong. During his six months stay in India, he scored seven goals in 16 league appearances for the club.

=== Kedah F.A. ===
In February 2014, Mehmet signed for Malaysian Premier League club Kedah FA for the 2014 season. He made an immediate impact for his new team, scoring six goals in his first four games and being awarded the club's Player of the Month award. Mehmet went on to be the club's top goal scorer with 23 goals in 26 games.

=== Sarawak F.A. ===
Mehmet decided to move onto Malaysian Super League side Sarawak FA at the end of the 2014 season. Mehmet was also offered a contract at Super League side Perak, but chose Sarawak FA. Mehmet had a great pre season with Sarawak scoring on his debut game for the club. Mehmet scored 8 goals in pre season with Sarawak FA. Mehmet also scored on his full debut and his next 2 games in the Malaysian Super League with Sarawak. Mehmet ended the 2015 season as Sarawak FA's top goal scorer and was the 3rd highest goal scorer in the 2015 Malaysian Super League. Mehmet left the club at the end of his contract.

=== Tampines Rovers ===
After leaving Sarawak FA at the end of his contract, Mehmet signed for Tampines Rovers in the S-League after declining offers from football clubs in Malaysia and Indonesia. Tampines manager Sundram wanted to sign Mehmet when he was in charge at Negeri in the Malaysian Super League but missed out when Mehmet signed with Sarawak FA.

=== Brunei DPMM ===
It was announced that Mehmet would leave the 2016 S.League runners-up side Tampines Rovers for Brunei DPMM. He scored his first goal for the Bruneian club on 2 April 2017 against Hougang United. He left the club in June 2017.

=== Merit Alsancak Yeşilova ===
On 6 July 2017, Mehmet signed a contract with Turkish Cypriot club Merit Alsancak Yeşilova. He scored twice in the friendly game against Bostancı Bağcıl on 11 August.

== International career ==
Mehmet qualifies for the Republic of Ireland through his Irish maternal grandfather. He has played for the Republic of Ireland U21 national team and made his debut against Poland in April 2004. He qualifies for England, Cyprus and Turkey due to his mother being half English and half Irish and his father being Cypriot.

Mehmet received a call-up from the Northern Cyprus national team ahead of the 2018 ConIFA World Football Cup. On 31 May 2018, he scored on his debut for Northern Cyprus, scoring the opening goal in a 1–1 draw with Kárpátalja.

== Personal life ==
Mehmet was born in London to a mother of English and Irish descent, and a Turkish Cypriot father.

== Career statistics ==
As of 15 May 2017

Appearances and goals by club, season and competition
| Club | Season | League | | National cup | | League cup | | Finals | | Continental | | Total | |
| Club | Season | Apps | Goals | Apps | Goals | Apps | Goals | Apps | Goals | Apps | Goals | Apps | Goals |
|---|---|---|---|---|---|---|---|---|---|---|---|---|---|
| Dunfermline | 2003–04 | 18 | 1 | 1 | | 2 | | | | | | 21 | 1 |
| Dunfermline | 2004–05 | 31 | 2 | | | 2 | 1 | | | | | 33 | 3 |
| St Mirren | 2005–06 | 31 | 2 | 2 | | 2 | | | | | | 35 | 2 |
| St Mirren | 2006–07 | 25 | 2 | | | 2 | 2 | | | | | 25 | 4 |
| St Mirren | 2007–08 | 37 | 6 | 5 | 2 | 1 | 0 | | | | | 43 | 8 |
| St Mirren | 2008–09 | 34 | 10 | 4 | 2 | 2 | 3 | | | | | 40 | 15 |
| St Mirren | 2009–10 | 37 | 9 | 3 | 2 | 5 | 6 | | | | | 45 | 17 |
| Perth Glory | 2011–12 | 28 | 9 | | | | | | | | | 28 | 9 |
| Perth Glory | 2012–13 | 14 | 5 | | | | | | | | | 14 | 5 |
| Bangkok Glass | 2013 | 4 | 2 | | | | | | | | | 4 | 2 |
| Kedah FA | 2014 | 26 | 23 | | | | | | | | | 26 | 23 |
| Sarawak FA | 2015 | 25 | 15 | | | | | | | | | 25 | 15 |
| Tampines Rovers | 2016 | 22 | 11 | | | | | | | 7 | 9 | 29 | 20 |
| Brunei DPMM | 2017 | 8 | 2 | | | | | | | 0 | 0 | 8 | 2 |
| Career total | | 267 | 94 | 15 | 6 | 16 | 12 | 0 | 0 | 0 | 0 | 344 | 126 |

== Honours ==
Dunfermline Athletic

- Scottish Cup runner-up: 2004

St Mirren

- Scottish Football League First Division: 2005–06
- Scottish Challenge Cup: 2005–06
- Scottish League Cup runner-up: 2010

Samsunspor

- TFF First League runner-up and promotion: 2011

Perth Glory

- A-League Grand Final runner-up: 2012

Kedah FA

- Malaysia FA Cup runner-up: 2014

Sarawak FA

- Malaysia FA Cup quarter finalist: 2015

Tampines Rovers

- Singapore FA Cup runner-up: 2016
- S-League runner-up: 2016
- AFC Cup quarter finalist: 2016
- Singapore League Cup quarter finalist: 2016

Northern Cyprus

- ConIFA World Football Cup second place: 2018
