= Rui Kumada =

Japanese footballer

Personal information
- Date of birth: September 5, 1992 (age 34)
- Place of birth: Osaka Prefecture, Japan
- Height: 1.77 m (5 ft 10 in)
- Position: Midfielder

Team information
- Current team: Khon Kaen United

Youth career
- 2008–2010: Withus Navi High School

College career
Years	Team	Apps	(Gls)
2011–2014	Osaka Gakuin University		

Senior career*
Years	Team	Apps	(Gls)
2015–2017	Albirex Niigata FC (Singapore)	61	(5)
2018–	Khon Kaen United	0	(0)
- * Club domestic league appearances and goals as of 6 February 2018

Rui Kumada (熊田 瑠偉, Kumada Rui; born September 5, 1992) is a Japanese footballer who plays as a midfielder.

== Football career ==
Kumada was educated at and played for Withus Navi High School & Osaka Gakuin University before moving to Singapore in 2015. He extended his contract in 2015 to play for 2016 after a successful 2015 season.

In 2018, Kumada joined Khon Kaen United F.C. of Thai League 4.

== Club career statistics ==
As of January 2, 2016

Club performance			League		Cup		League Cup		Total	
Season	Club	League	Apps	Goals	Apps	Goals	Apps	Goals	Apps	Goals
Singapore			League		Singapore Cup		League Cup		Total	
2015	Albirex Niigata FC (S)	S.League	19	1	6	0	4	0	29	1
2016	Albirex Niigata FC (S)	S.League	18	3	5	1	5	1	28	5
2017	Albirex Niigata FC (S)	S.League	?	?	?	?	?	?	?	?
Thailand			League		Thailand FA Cup		League Cup		Total	
2018	Khon Kaen United F.C.	Thai League 4	0	0	0	0	0	0	0	0
Total
Total	Singapore		37	4	11	1	9	1	57	6
Career total			37	4	11	1	9	1	57	6
