= Singapore Community Shield =

Community Shield
- Founded: 2008; 18 years ago
- Region: Singapore
- Teams: 2
- Current champions: Lion City Sailors (4th title)
- Most championships: Tampines Rovers (6 titles)
- Broadcaster(s): Mycujoo; 1 Play Sports (via social medias); Singapore; Singtel TV; Starhub; Brunei; RTB
- 2026 Singapore Community Shield

The Singapore Community Shield (formerly the Charity Shield), officially known as the Playback Community Shield for sponsorship reasons, is an annual match in Singapore football contested between the champions of the previous Singapore Premier League season and the Singapore Cup winners. If the same team wins both the league and the Singapore Cup, the match is played against the Singapore Premier League runners-up. The fixture is recognised as a competitive super cup by the Football Association and Asian Football Confederation.

== History ==
The Charity Shield was first contested in 2008. In the inaugural match, the Singapore Armed Forces defeated Home United 5–4 on penalties following a 1–1 draw. The Shield also doubled up as the season's opening fixture in 2014 and remained so for all subsequent editions until 2018.

Great Eastern and Yeo's are the co-sponsors for the Community Shield from 2008 to 2016. Great Eastern was the sole sponsor when Yeo's withdrew its sponsorship in 2017.

On 23 February 2019, the Football Association of Singapore (FAS) announced that AIA Singapore as the new title sponsor of the Singapore Premier League and Community Shield as part of a two-year agreement.

On 28 August 2026, the Football Association of Singapore (FAS) appointed Playback as the title sponsor of the Singapore Community Shield for the 2026–27 season. The competition was consequently named the Playback Community Shield for sponsorship reason.

== Past results ==
Year	Champions	Score	Runners-up	Note	Venue
2008	SAFFC	1–1 (a.e.t.) (5–4 pen.)	Home United		Jalan Besar Stadium
2009	S.League Foreign Players	2–0	S.League Local Players		Jalan Besar Stadium
2010	Singapore Armed Forces, AIK (Sweden)	1–1	—N/a	Title was shared	Jalan Besar Stadium
2011	Tampines Rovers	2–1	Étoile		Jalan Besar Stadium
2012	Tampines Rovers	2–0	Home United		Jalan Besar Stadium
2013	Tampines Rovers	2–1	Warriors FC		Jalan Besar Stadium
2014	Tampines Rovers	1–0	Home United		Jalan Besar Stadium
2015	Warriors FC	1–0	Balestier Khalsa		Jalan Besar Stadium
2016	Albirex Niigata (S)	3–2	DPMM (Brunei)		Jalan Besar Stadium
2017	Albirex Niigata (S)	2–1	Tampines Rovers		Jalan Besar Stadium
2018	Albirex Niigata (S)	2–1	Tampines Rovers		National Stadium
2019	Home United	0-0 (a.e.t.) (5-4 pen.)	Albirex Niigata (S)		Jalan Besar Stadium
2020	Tampines Rovers	3–0	Hougang United		Jalan Besar Stadium
2021	Competition cancelled due to COVID-19 pandemic in Singapore.				
2022	Lion City Sailors	2–1	Albirex Niigata (S)		Jalan Besar Stadium
2023	Albirex Niigata (S)	3–0	Hougang United		Jalan Besar Stadium
2024	Lion City Sailors	2–0	Albirex Niigata (S)		Jalan Besar Stadium
2025	Tampines Rovers	4–1	Lion City Sailors		Jurong East Stadium
2026	Lion City Sailors	2–0	Tampines Rovers		Jalan Besar Stadium

=== Performance by clubs ===
Club	Winners	Runners-up	Winning years
Tampines Rovers	6	3	2011, 2012, 2013, 2014, 2020, 2025
Lion City Sailors	4	4	2019, 2022, 2024, 2026
FC Jurong	4	3	2016, 2017, 2018, 2023
Warriors	3	1	2008, 2010 (shared), 2015
AIK (Sweden)	1	0	2010 (shared)
S.League Foreign Players	1	0	2009
Hougang United	0	2	
S.League Local Players	0	1	
Étoile	0	1	
Balestier Khalsa	0	1	
DPMM (Brunei)	0	1	

== See also ==
- Singapore Premier League
- Singapore Cup
- Singapore League Cup
- Football Association of Singapore
- List of football clubs in Singapore
