= Jurong West Sports and Recreation Centre =

Centre for sports and recreational activities in Singapore

Jurong West Sports and Recreational Centre
- 裕廊西体育场
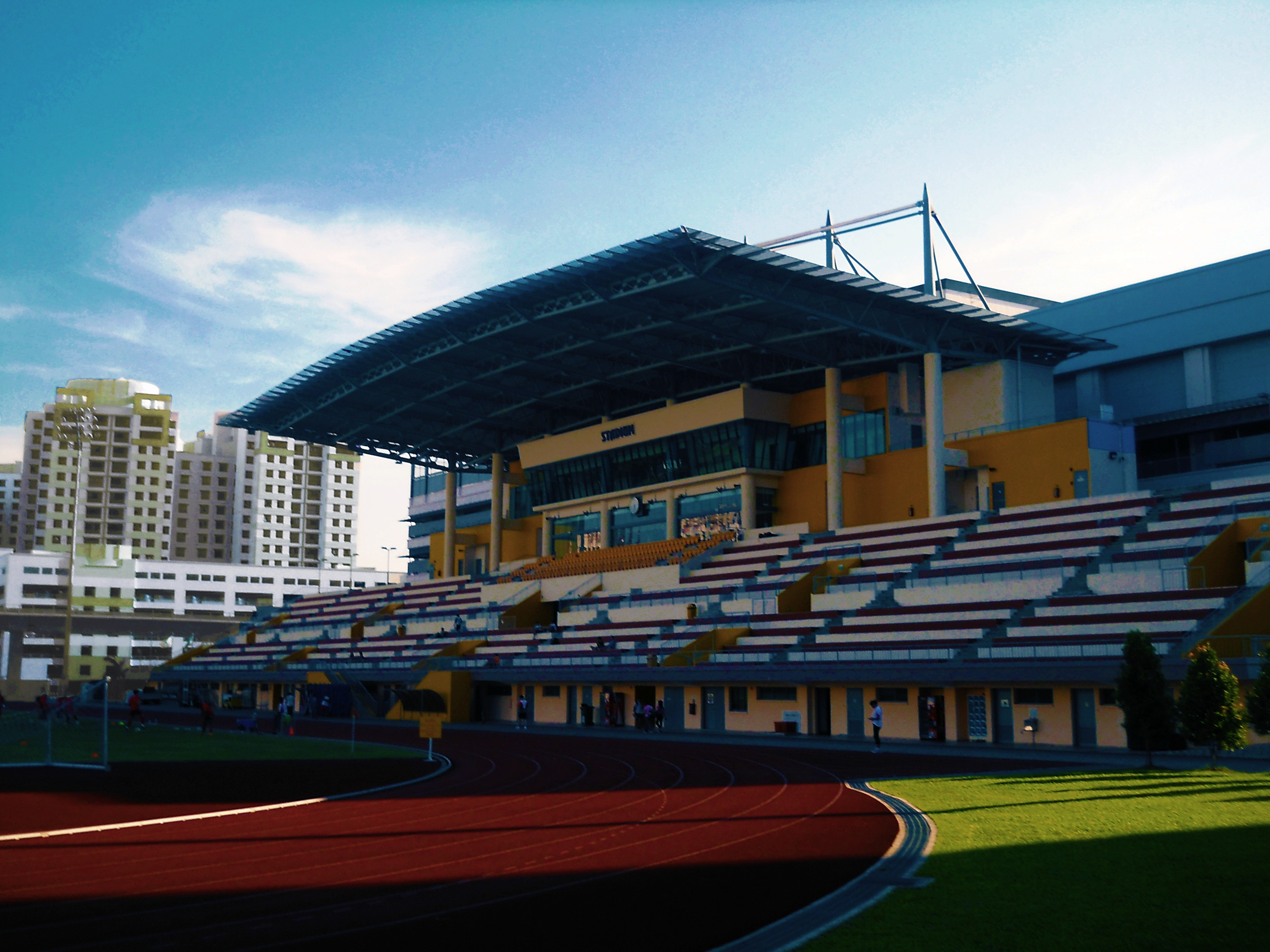
- Interactive map of Jurong West Sports and Recreational Centre
- Full name: Jurong West ActiveSG Stadium
- Address: 20 Jurong West Street 93, Singapore 648965
- Location: Jurong West, Singapore
- Coordinates: 1.3378°N 103.6942°E
- Owner: Sport Singapore
- Operator: Sport Singapore
- Capacity: 4,600
- Surface: Grass
- Scoreboard: Yes
- Public transit: EW28 Pioneer

Construction
- Opened: 10 November 2006; 19 years ago

Tenants
- Gombak United FC (2006–2012); Tampines Rovers FC (2015-2017)

Website
- https://www.myactivesg.com/Facilities/jurong-west-stadium

Jurong West Sports and Recreation Centre is a centre for sports and recreational activities. It was officially opened to the public on 10 November 2006. It is the largest integrated sports centre in Singapore.

== Location ==
The stadium is located in Jurong West, near Pioneer MRT station.

== History ==
The stadium was opened in 2006, and served temporary as the home stadium for Tampines Rovers FC from 2015 to 2017. currently there no Singapore premier league team.

== Facilities & structures ==
=== Stadium ===
Jurong West Stadium is a multi-purpose stadium used mostly for football matches. It used to be the temporary home stadium of S.League outfit Tampines Rovers FC from 2015 to 2017. It is currently the home stadium for Young Lions FC. The stadium has a seating capacity of 4,200. The stadium is also second-in-line to host international football matches, behind Jalan Besar Stadium and ahead of the Marina Bay Floating Platform.

There is a dedicated space for inline skating and dual usage for inline skating on the running track as well.

=== Swimming complex ===
Jurong West Swimming Complex is the first swimming complex in Singapore to feature a sheltered olympic-sized swimming pool, amongst others such as a teaching pool, jacuzzi, kiddy pool, lazy river and a water playground. It has a seating capacity of 465.

=== Sports hall ===
The sports hall consists of the Jurong West Tennis Centre, badminton court and a gymnasium.

== Transport ==
The stadium is accessible by car, and it is a short walk from Pioneer MRT station.

== International fixtures ==
Date	Competition	Team	Score	Team
26 November 2010	Friendly	Singapore	4–0	Laos
15 August 2012	Friendly	Singapore	2–0	Hong Kong
19 November 2012	Friendly	Singapore	4–0	Pakistan

== See also ==
- Pioneer
- Nanyang
- List of stadiums in Singapore
