= Rafael Ramazotti =

Brazilian footballer

Personal information
- Full name: Rafael Ramazotti de Quadros
- Date of birth: 9 August 1988 (age 38)
- Place of birth: São Caetano, Brazil
- Height: 1.93 m (6 ft 4 in)
- Position: Striker

Senior career*
Years	Team	Apps	(Gls)
2005–2008	Palmeiras B	?	(?)
2008	→ Juventus-SC (loan)	?	(?)
2009	Ipitanga	4	(0)
2009	União São João	?	(?)
2009–2011	Santo André	6	(0)
2010–2011	→ Gil Vicente (loan)	25	(8)
2011	→ Avispa Fukuoka (loan)	4	(1)
2012	Zürich	3	(0)
2012	Gil Vicente	3	(0)
2013	Bragantino	?	(?)
2014	Passo Fundo	?	(?)
2014	ASA	2	(0)
2014	Gainare Tottori	12	(7)
2015–2017	DPMM	71	(55)
2018	PKNS	21	(7)
2019	Hougang United	0	(0)
2019	Juárez	10	(0)
2019–2020	Daejeon Citizen	10	(4)
2020–2021	São Bento	2	(0)
2021	Gimhae FC	8	(0)
2021–2022	Glacis United	8	(2)
2022	→ Muaither (loan)	0	(0)
2023	GO Audax	7	(1)
- * Club domestic league appearances and goals

Rafael Ramazotti de Quadros (born 9 August 1988), sometimes known as just Ramazotti for his Italian heritage, is a Brazilian former association footballer who played as a striker.

== Club career ==
Before signing with the Japanese club Avispa Fukuoka on a loan, Ramazotti had played in Brazil with several clubs, as well as appearing for a team in Portugal. He made his debut for Avispa Fukuoka in the 6–0 thumping Avispa received at the hands of Kashima Antlers on the 28 August 2011.

After 4 substitute appearances, including a goal scored against Shimizu S-Pulse, he left Avispa having failed to avoid relegation. Soon after leaving Japan, he arrived in Switzerland where he signed a contract with FC Zurich until the end of the season, with an extension clause.

=== DPMM ===
Ramazotti signed with Bruneian club DPMM in 2015 and became the top-scorer of the Singapore S.League with 21 goals in a title-winning season. He was also nominated for the Best Goal and Best Player awards.

He won the S.League Golden Boot once again the following year, but his team finished in third place this time. He left DPMM after the conclusion of his third season with the Bruneian side, scoring 14 league goals.

=== PNKS ===
On 30 January 2018, Ramazotti joined Malaysian Super League club PKNS.

=== Hougang United ===
On 6 January 2019, he signed for Hougang United for only 23 days and ditched by the "abruptly vacated the club’s tenanted apartment" and “left Singapore” without settling the compensation to the club. On 29 January, he has been unveiled on Tuesday as a new player of FC Juárez, a Mexican club that plays in the second tier of the Mexican football pyramid of Liga MX.

== Career statistics ==
=== Club ===
As of match played 28 July 2018

Appearances and goals by club, season and competition
Club	Season	League			Cup		League Cup		Continental		Total	
Club	Season	Division	Apps	Goals	Apps	Goals	Apps	Goals	Apps	Goals	Apps	Goals
DPMM	2015	S.League	27	21	5	2	3	3	–		35	26
DPMM	2016	S.League	24	20	2	1	5	4	–		31	25
DPMM	2017	S.League	20	14	2	1	0	0	–		22	15
DPMM	Total		71	55	9	4	8	7	–		88	66
PKNS	2018	Malaysia Super League	21	7	6	2	0	0	–		27	9
PKNS	Total		21	7	6	2	0	0	–		27	9
Hougang United	2019	Singapore Premier League	0	-1	0	0	0	0	–		0	0
Hougang United	Total		23 days	-1	0	0	0	0	–		23 days	-1
Career Total			0	0	0	0	0	0	–	–	0	0

== Honours ==
=== Club ===
==== Gil Vicente ====
- Segunda Liga: 2010–11

==== DPMM ====
- S.League: 2015

=== Individual ===
- S.League Top Scorer: 2015, 2016
