= Singapore League Cup =

League Cup
- Founded: 2007
- Folded: 2017
- Country: Singapore
- Number of clubs: 8
- Last champions: Albirex Niigata (S) (4 titles)
- Most championships: Albirex Niigata (S) (4 titles)
- Website: Official website

The Singapore League Cup was an annual association football competition in Singapore. It was launched in 2007 and was open to teams who competed in the S.League. Albirex Niigata (S), a satellite club of Albirex Niigata of the J League, has won the most titles in history.

== History ==
The inaugural competition of 2007 was sponsored by SingTel, and officially titled the SingTel League Cup. Eight of the twelve S.League teams took part in the 2007 tournament, which was held before the start of the S.League season proper.

In 2008, the competition's official sponsored name was the Avaya-J&J League Cup (with sponsorship coming from Avaya and Jebsen & Jessen Communications). All twelve S.League teams took part in the 2008 tournament. Unlike the 2007 event, the 2008 competition was held during the S.League season.

The 2009 edition of the League Cup was held from 1 to 19 June, again during the S.League season. The competition began with a group stage, where the clubs were divided into four groups of three. The top two teams from each group qualified for the knockout stage. All knockout matches were played at the Jalan Besar Stadium. Live television coverage was provided by Starhub.

2010 saw the League Cup returning to a knockout format. The teams which finished in the top 4 positions in the 2009 S.League season were given byes to the quarter-final round, and the remaining clubs played a qualifying round to decide who would join them in the Cup competition. The draw was conducted before the qualifying round, which meant that qualifying clubs already knew which quarter-final slot they would be playing for.

The 2011 League Cup final on 30 July 2011 saw Albirex Niigata (S) defeat Hougang United FC 5–4 on penalties to become the third consecutive foreign club to hold the trophy after DPMM FC and Étoile FC.

The 2012 tournament was sponsored by StarHub, and officially titled the StarHub League Cup. The 2015 edition was sponsored by The New Paper and known as The New Paper League Cup.

The title sponsor for 2016 was The New Paper. In 2018, The Singapore League Cup was abolished to ease fixture congestion.

== Previous League Cup tournament (1997) ==
A competition called the Singapore League Cup was also held in Singapore in 1997. In that year it was won by the Singapore Armed Forces who defeated Geylang United 1–0 in the final. In 1998, that competition was renamed the Singapore Cup, and was opened to teams that do not play in the S.League. The Singapore Cup is now the major cup competition in Singapore football, and in recent years has involved invited teams from overseas in addition to teams playing in Singapore's local leagues.

Year	Winners	Runners-up	Score in Final	3rd place	4th place
1997	Singapore Armed Forces	Geylang United	1-0	Tampines Rovers; Tiong Bahru United	No 3rd-place play-off

=== Results ===
Year	Winners	Runners-up	Score in final	3rd place	4th place
2007	Woodlands Wellington	Sengkang Punggol	4-0	Gombak United	Home United
2008	Gombak United	Super Reds	2-1	Balestier Khalsa	Young Lions
2009	DPMM (Brunei)	Singapore Armed Forces	1-1 (aet); 4-3 (pen)	Home United	Woodlands Wellington
2010	Étoile	Woodlands Wellington	3-1	Sengkang Punggol	Gombak United
2011	Albirex Niigata (S)	Hougang United	0-0 (aet); 5-4 (pen)	Tampines Rovers	Home United
2012	DPMM (Brunei)	Geylang United	2-0	Singapore Armed Forces; Tampines Rovers	No 3rd-place play-off
2013	Balestier Khalsa	DPMM (Brunei)	4-0	Albirex Niigata (S); Woodlands Wellington	No 3rd-place play-off
2014	DPMM (Brunei)	Tanjong Pagar United	2-0	Hougang United; Geylang International	No 3rd-place play-off
2015	Albirex Niigata (S)	Balestier Khalsa	2-1	Hougang United; Geylang International	No 3rd-place play-off
2016	Albirex Niigata (S)	DPMM (Brunei)	2-0	Home United; Tampines Rovers	No 3rd-place play-off
2017	Albirex Niigata (S)	Warriors FC	1-0 (aet)	DPMM (Brunei); Geylang International	No 3rd-place play-off

=== Plate Tournament ===
From 2012, a Plate Tournament was launched for the four teams that finished third in their respective groups.

Year	Winners	Runners-up	Score in Final
2012	Balestier Khalsa	Young Lions	1–0
2013	Harimau Muda B	Young Lions	2–0
2014	Tampines Rovers	Balestier Khalsa	3–0
2015	Not held		
2016	Geylang International	Hougang United	2–1
2017	Not held		

=== Performance by Clubs ===
Club	Winners	Runners-up	Plate Winners	Winning years
Albirex Niigata (S)	4	0	0	2011, 2015, 2016, 2017
DPMM	3	2	0	2009, 2012, 2014
Balestier Khalsa	1	1	1	2013
Woodlands Wellington	1	1	0	2007
Gombak United	1	0	0	2008
Étoile	1	0	0	2010
Warriors FC	0	2	0	
Hougang United	0	2	0	
Geylang International	0	1	1	
Super Reds	0	1	0	
Tanjong Pagar United	0	1	0	
Harimau Muda B	0	0	1	
Tampines Rovers	0	0	1	

== Sponsorship ==
Period	Sponsor	Name
2007	Singtel	SingTel League Cup
2008	Avaya and Jebsen & Jessen Communications	Avaya-J&J League Cup
2009–2011	No main sponsor	Singapore League Cup
2012–2014	StarHub	StarHub League Cup
2015–2017	The New Paper	The New Paper League Cup

== See also ==
- Singapore Premier League
- Singapore Cup
- Singapore Community Shield
- Singapore National Football League
- Football Association of Singapore
- List of football clubs in Singapore
