= Singapore Cup =

Annual Singaporean football competition

- Organiser(s): Football Association of Singapore
- Founded: 1998; 28 years ago
- Region: Singapore
- Teams: 9
- Qualifier for: AFC Champions League Two (Singaporean clubs only)
- Domestic cup: Community Shield
- Current champions: Lion City Sailors (9th title)
- Most championships: Lion City Sailors (9 titles)
- Broadcaster(s): 1 Play Sports (live streaming); Mediacorp; Singtel TV; Starhub; J Sports
- Website: spl.sg
- 2025–26 Singapore Cup

The Singapore Cup is an annual knockout football competition in men's domestic Singaporean football. Established with that name in 1998, it is the foremost prestigious cup competition in the country. It is open to clubs in the Singapore Premier League.

In 1997, the FAS had commenced the Singapore League Cup as a cup competition for S. League clubs in addition to the Singapore FA Cup. In 1998, the Singapore League Cup was renamed the Singapore Cup, and S. League clubs ceased participating in the Singapore FA Cup. The Singapore Cup remains a cup competition for the top flight only (rebranded as the Singapore Premier League in 2018).

Since 2004, foreign teams from other countries in Southeast Asia are occasionally invited to compete in the Singapore Cup. DPMM of Brunei were the first foreign team to enter the competition, years before they eventually competed in the S.League. Thailand club, Chonburi was the first foreign club reaching the final in 2006 (they lost 3–2 in the final to local club Tampines Rovers). In 2009, Bangkok Glass became the second foreign team to reach the final, losing against local club Geylang United, but they beat Tampines Rovers in 2010 to become the first foreign winners of the Singapore Cup.

Winners of the Singapore Cup gain qualification into the Asian continental club competition, AFC Champions League Two. Lion City Sailors are the current holders, having beaten Tampines Rovers 2–0 in the 2025–26 final to retain the trophy.

== Past results ==
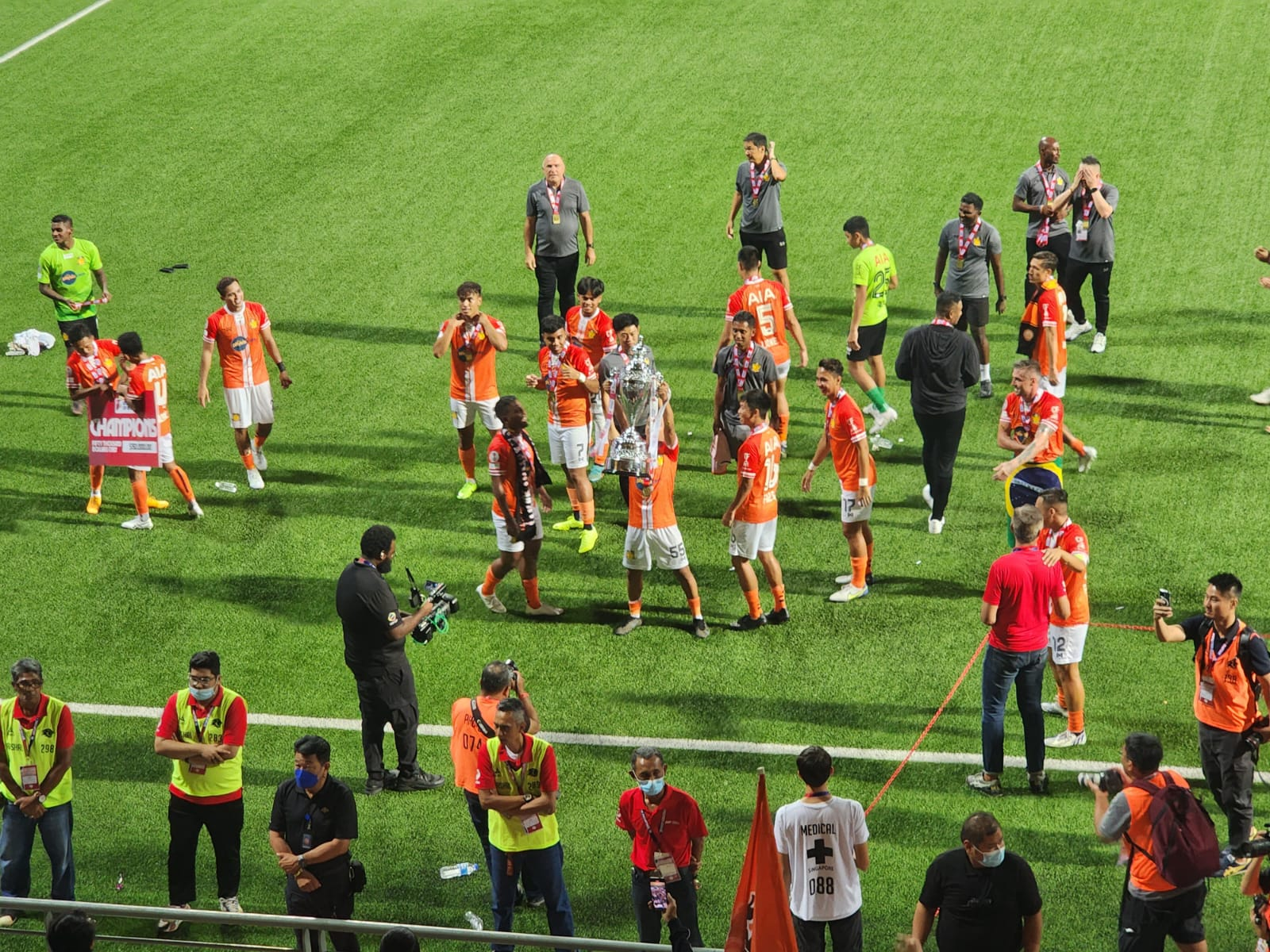
Hougang United players holding the Singapore Cup trophy after winning the 2022 edition

Year	Winners	Runners-up	Score in final	3rd place	4th place
1998	Tanjong Pagar United	Singapore Armed Forces	2–0	Home United	Sembawang Rangers
1999	Singapore Armed Forces	Jurong Town	3–1	Home United	Balestier Central
2000	Home United	Singapore Armed Forces	1–0	Geylang United	Woodlands Wellington
2001	Home United	Geylang United	8–0	Singapore Armed Forces	Tanjong Pagar United
2002	Tampines Rovers	Jurong Town	1–0	Geylang United	Sengkang Marine
2003	Home United	Geylang United	2–1	Jurong Town; Woodlands Wellington	No 3rd-place playoff
2004	Tampines Rovers	Home United	4–1 (aet)	Geylang United; Sinchi (China)	No 3rd-place playoff
2005	Home United	Woodlands Wellington	3–2	Singapore Armed Forces; Tampines Rovers	No 3rd-place playoff
2006	Tampines Rovers	Chonburi (Thailand)	3–2 (aet)	Woodlands Wellington	Balestier Khalsa
2007	Singapore Armed Forces	Tampines Rovers	4–3	Bangkok University (Thailand)	Woodlands Wellington
2008	Singapore Armed Forces	Woodlands Wellington	2–1 (aet)	Tampines Rovers	Young Lions
2009	Geylang United	Bangkok Glass (Thailand)	1–0	TTM Samut Sakhon (Thailand)	Albirex Niigata (S)
2010	Bangkok Glass (Thailand)	Tampines Rovers	1–0	Étoile	Young Lions
2011	Home United	Albirex Niigata (S)	1–0 (aet)	Étoile	Hougang United
2012	Singapore Armed Forces	Tampines Rovers	2–1	Gombak United	Loyola Meralco Sparks (Philippines)
2013	Home United	Tanjong Pagar United	4–1	Balestier Khalsa	Global (Philippines)
2014	Balestier Khalsa	Home United	3–1	Tampines Rovers	DPMM (Brunei)
2015	Albirex Niigata (S)	Home United	2–1	DPMM (Brunei)	Global (Philippines)
2016	Albirex Niigata (S)	Tampines Rovers	2–0	Ceres-La Salle (Philippines)	Balestier Khalsa
2017	Albirex Niigata (S)	Global Cebu (Philippines)	2–2; 3–1 (pen)	Home United	Hougang United
2018	Albirex Niigata (S)	DPMM (Brunei)	4–1	Balestier Khalsa	Home United
2019	Tampines Rovers	Warriors	4–3	Geylang International	DPMM (Brunei)
2020	Competition cancelled due to COVID-19 pandemic in Singapore.				
2021	Competition cancelled due to COVID-19 pandemic in Singapore.				
2022	Hougang United	Tampines Rovers	3–2	Albirex Niigata (S)	Balestier Khalsa
2023	Lion City Sailors	Hougang United	3–1	Tampines Rovers	DPMM (Brunei)
2024–25	Lion City Sailors	Tampines Rovers	1–0	BG Pathum United (Thailand); DPMM (Brunei)	No 3rd-place playoff
2025–26	Lion City Sailors	Tampines Rovers	2–0	Balestier Khalsa Albirex Niigata (S)	No 3rd-place playoff

Key
Invitational club

=== Performance by club ===
Club	Winners	Runners-up	Winning years
Lion City Sailors	9	3	2000, 2001, 2003, 2005, 2011, 2013, 2023, 2024-25, 2025–26
Tampines Rovers	4	7	2002, 2004, 2006, 2019
Warriors	4	3	1999, 2007, 2008, 2012
FC Jurong	4	1	2015, 2016, 2017, 2018
Geylang International	1	2	2009
Tanjong Pagar United	1	1	1998
Bangkok Glass (Thailand)	1	1	2010
Hougang United	1	1	2022
Balestier Khalsa	1	0	2014
Jurong Town	0	2	
Woodlands Wellington	0	2	
Global Cebu (Philippines)	0	1	
Chonburi (Thailand)	0	1	
DPMM (Brunei)	0	1	

== See also ==
- Singapore Premier League
- Singapore League Cup
- Singapore Community Shield
- Football Association of Singapore
- List of football clubs in Singapore
