= 2017 Albirex Niigata Singapore FC season =

Albirex Niigata (S)
2017 season
- Chairman: Daisuke Korenaga
- Head coach: Kazuaki Yoshinaga
- Stadium: Jurong East Stadium
- S.League: 1st (champions)
- Singapore Cup: Winners
- League Cup: Winners

The 2017 season was Albirex Niigata Singapore FC's 14th consecutive season in the top flight of Singapore football and in the S.League, having joined the S.League in 2004. Along with the S.League, the club alsod competed in the Singapore Cup and the Singapore League Cup. They were the defending champions.

== Squad ==
As of 25 January 2017.

No.	Name	Date of birth (age)	Previous club
Goalkeepers
1	(Japan) Shuhei Yamada	22 April 1993 (age 33)	(Japan) Fujieda MYFC
21	(Japan) Yosuke Nozawa	9 November 1979 (age 46)	(Japan) Matsumoto Yamaga FC
22	(Japan) Junpei Yamada	26 August 1994 (age 32)	(Japan) Yamanashi Gakuin University
Defenders
2	(Japan) Tomoki Menda	6 July 1993 (age 33)	(Japan) Doshisha University
3	(Japan) Takuya Akiyama	26 August 1994 (age 32)	(Japan) Osaka University of Health and Sport Sciences
4	(Japan) Yuki Yamanouchi	18 September 1994 (age 32)	(Japan) Oita Trinita
5	(Japan) Naofumi Tanaka	11 February 1993 (age 33)	(Japan) Osaka Kyoiku University
13	(Japan) Yasutaka Yanagi	22 June 1994 (age 32)	(Japan) Senshu University
15	(Japan) Shoma Kondo	25 July 1997 (age 29)	Japan Soccer College
16	(Japan) Rui Kumada	5 September 1992 (age 34)	(Japan) Osaka Gakuin University
17	(Japan) Satoru Matsuki	17 April 1997 (age 29)	Japan Soccer College
	(Japan) Seiya Kato	19 May 1994 (age 32)	(Japan) Tokyo University of Agriculture
Midfielders
6	(Japan) Shuto Inaba	29 June 1993 (age 33)	(Japan) Fukuoka University
7	(Japan) Ryota Nakai	16 January 1995 (age 31)	(Japan) Momoyama Gakuin University
10	(Japan) Kento Nagasaki	5 June 1990 (age 36)	(Japan) Shizuoka Sangyo University
14	(Japan) Ryuya Motoda	2 September 1994 (age 32)	(Japan) Mito HollyHock
19	(Japan) Kenya Kodama	25 February 1997 (age 29)	Japan Soccer College
20	(Japan) Yuki Kataoka	10 March 1998 (age 28)	Japan Soccer College
23	(Japan) Kouki Sato	3 September 1996 (age 30)	Japan Soccer College
Forwards
8	(Japan) Hiroyoshi Kamata	4 April 1997 (age 29)	(Japan) Albirex Niigata U-18
9	(Japan) Tsubasa Sano	18 October 1994 (age 31)	(Japan) Juntendo University
11	(Japan) Shoichiro Sakamoto	18 August 1995 (age 31)	(Japan) Tegevajaro Miyazaki
18	(Japan) Minoru Iwaki	11 October 1997 (age 28)	Japan Soccer College
24	(Japan) Yusuke Yamazaki	3 October 1997 (age 28)	Japan Soccer College

== Coaching staff ==
Position	Name
Head Coach	(Japan) Kazuaki Yoshinaga
Coach	(Japan) Takafumi Mizuno
Coach	(Japan) Shuhei Ogawa
Team Manager	(Japan)
Physiotherapist	(Japan)
Kitman	(Japan)

== Transfers ==
=== Pre-season transfers ===
==== In ====
Position	Player	Transferred From	Ref
GK	(Japan) Shuhei Yamada	(Japan) Fujieda MYFC	
GK	(Japan) Junpei Yamada	(Japan) Yamanashi Gakuin University	
DF	(Japan) Seiya Kato	(Japan) Tokyo University of Agriculture	
DF	(Japan) Takuya Akiyama	(Japan) Osaka University of Health and Sport Sciences	
DF	(Japan) Shoma Kondo	Japan Soccer College	
DF	(Japan) Satoru Matsuki	Japan Soccer College	
DF	(Japan) Yasutaka Yanagi	(Japan) Senshu University	
MF	(Japan) Yuki Yamanouchi	(Japan) Oita Trinita	
MF	(Japan) Ryuya Motoda	(Japan) Mito Hollyhock	Loan
MF	(Japan) Yuki Kataoka	Japan Soccer College	
MF	(Japan) Kouki Sato	Japan Soccer College	
FW	(Japan) Shoichiro Sakamoto	(Japan) Tegevajaro Miyazaki	
FW	(Japan) Ryota Nakai	(Japan) Momoyama Gakuin University	
FW	(Japan) Tsubasa Sano	(Japan) Juntendo University	
FW	(Japan) Minoru Iwaki	Japan Soccer College	
FW	(Japan) Yusuke Yamazaki	Japan Soccer College	

==== Out ====
Position	Player	Transferred To	Ref
DF	(Japan) [[]]	(Cambodia) Nagaworld FC	
DF	(Japan) Atsushi Shirota	(Singapore) Hougang United	
MF	(Japan) Masaya Jitozono	(Malaysia) Sabah FA	
MF	(Japan) Tatsuro Inui	(Thailand) Thai Honda	
FW	(Japan) Kazuki Mine	(Japan) Kyoto Sanga	
FW	(Japan) Atsushi Kawata	(Japan) Albirex Niigata	
DF	(Japan) Tadaaki Yazawa	Released	
GK	(Japan) Eita Kasagawa	Retired	
GK	(Japan) Shunkun Tani	(Spain) Estudiantes de Murcia	
DF	(Japan) Mikiya Yamada	(Australia) Surfers Paradise Apollo SC	
DF	(Japan) Ryo Kurihara	Released	
DF	(Japan) Teppei Harashima	Released	
MF	(Japan) Daichi Ishiyama	Released	
MF	(Japan) Ryuki Matsuya	Released	
MF	(Japan) Kouki Mukai	Released	
FW	(Japan) Shuma Miyata	Released	

=== Mid-season transfers ===
==== Trial ====
Position	Player	Trial At	Ref
DF	(Japan) Yasutaka Yanagi	(Japan) Albirex Niigata	
MF	(Japan) Shuto Inaba	(Japan) Albirex Niigata	

== Friendlies ==
=== Pre-season friendlies ===
Win Draw Loss

1 February 2017 Friendly	Albirex Niigata (S) (Japan)	14–0	St Andrew JC
	Ryota Nakai 10', 22', 23'; Ryuya Motoda 10', 21', 73', 84'; Shoichiro Sakamoto 12', 15', 51'; Yusuke Yamazaki 49', 54'; Hiroyoshi Kamata 69', 72'	Report

4 February 2017 Friendly	Albirex Niigata (S) (Japan)	2–0	(Singapore) SAFSA
	Ryota Nakai 26'; Rui Kumada 86'	Report

9 February 2017 Friendly	Albirex Niigata (S) (Japan)	2–0	(Philippines) Ceres–Negros	Jurong East Stadium
9am	Ryota Nakai 5'; Hiroyoshi Kamata 17'

11 February 2017 Friendly	Albirex Niigata (S) (Japan)	1–0	Warriors FC	Choa Chu Kang Stadium
	Takuya Akiyama 85'

15 February 2017 Friendly	Albirex Niigata (S) (Japan)	1–0	Balestier Khalsa	Toa Payoh Stadium
	Ryota Nakai 28'	Report	Sheikh Abdul Hadi (red card) 0'; Marko Kraljević (red card) 0'

18 February 2017 Friendly	Albirex Niigata (S) (Japan)	2–0	Hougang United	Hougang Stadium
	Hiroyoshi Kamata 43'; Shuto Inaba 58'	Report

19 February 2017 Friendly	Albirex Niigata (S) (Japan)	5–2	(Singapore) NFA U18 (Prime League)	Jurong East Stadium
	Shoichiro Sakamoto 2'; Yusuke Yamazaki 47'; Yuki Kataoka 60'; Tsubasa Sano 79', 81'	Report

=== In Season Friendlies ===
11 March 2017 Friendly	Albirex Niigata (S) (Japan)	3–0	(Japan) Albirex Niigata U18	Jurong East Stadium
	Shoichiro Sakamoto 19', 26'; Ryota Nakai 34'	Report

17 March 2017 Friendly	Albirex Niigata (S) (Japan)	3–1	(Malaysia) JDT II	Pasir Gudang Stadium
	Tsubasa Sano 43', 45'; Kento Nagasaki 56' (pen.)	Report	Alex Smith 23'

24 March 2017 Friendly	Albirex Niigata (S) (Japan)	cancelled	Geylang International	Bedok Stadium

24 March 2017 Friendly	Albirex Niigata (S) (Japan)	8–0	(Singapore) Young Lions	Jurong East Stadium
	Yasutaka Yanagi 7'; Tsubasa Sano 8', 44'; Kento Nagasaki 15', 37'; Ryota Nakai 17', 29'; Shoichiro Sakamoto 61'	Report

25 March 2017 Friendly	Albirex Niigata (S) (Japan)	cancelled	SAFSA	Jurong East Stadium

2 April 2017 Friendly	Albirex Niigata (S) (Japan)	4–1	Tiong Bahru FC	Jurong East Stadium
	Shoichiro Sakamoto 7', 43'; Tomoki Menda 18'; Kenaya Kodama 42'

7 April 2017 Friendly	Albirex Niigata (S) (Japan)	6–0	Singapore Cricket Club	Jurong East Stadium
	Ryota Nakai 11', 87'; Kento Nagasaki 14', 39'; Tomoki Menda 50'; Hiroyoshi Kamata 90'

8 April 2017 Friendly	Albirex Niigata (S) (Japan)	cancelled	Yishun Sentek Mariners FC	Jurong East Stadium

8 April 2017 Friendly	Albirex Niigata (S) (Japan)	3–0	Home United Prime League	Jurong East Stadium
	Kouki Sato 16'; Kenya Kodama 63'; Ryuya Motoda 67'

22 April 2017 Friendly	Albirex Niigata (S) (Japan)	cancelled	Eunos Crescent	Jurong East Stadium

22 April 2017 Friendly	Albirex Niigata (S) (Japan)	3–2	SAFSA	Jurong East Stadium
	Koki Sato 26'; 77'; Shoichiro Sakamoto 80'	Report

30 April 2017 Friendly	Albirex Niigata (S) (Japan)	1–0	Eunos Crescent	Jurong East Stadium

12 May 2017 Friendly	Albirex Niigata (S) (Japan)	0–0	Balestier Khalsa	Jurong East Stadium

3 June 2017 Friendly	Albirex Niigata (S) (Japan)	cancelled	Singapore U22 Team	Jurong East Stadium

3 June 2017 Friendly	Albirex Niigata (S) (Japan)	10–0	Singapore Cricket Club	Jurong East Stadium
	15' (o.g.); Naofumi Tanaka 19', 21'; Tsubasa Sano 29'; Kento Nagasaki 31', 34'; Ryota Nakai 38'; Shoichiro Sakamoto 41'; Minoru Iwaki 51'; Tomoki Menda 80'

9 June 2017 Friendly	Albirex Niigata (S) (Japan)	1–0	Myanmar	Jurong East Stadium
	Kento Nagasaki 71'

17 June 2017 Friendly	Albirex Niigata (S) (Japan)	12–0	Simei United	Jurong East Stadium
	Shoichiro Sakamoto 27', 29', 47', 86'; Kenya Kodama 39'; Yosuke Yamazaki 52', 57', 89'; Hiroyoshi Kamata 58'; Yuto Inabe 72'; Hiroyoshi Sakamoto 83', 90+2'

2 September 2017 Friendly	Albirex Niigata (S) (Japan)	11–0	Yishun Sentek Mariners FC	Jurong East Stadium
	Ryota Nakai 17', 48'; Naofumi Tanaka 19'; Shoichiro Sakamoto 45', 55', 60'; Ryuya Motoda 54', 80'; Kento Nagasaki 57'; Yusuke Yamazaki 63', 66'

7 October 2017 Friendly	Albirex Niigata (S) (Japan)	2–1	Geylang International	Jurong East Stadium
	Shoichiro Sakamoto 1'; Tsubasa Sano 23'

Match cancelled after 1st half due to lightning warning signal

13 October 2017 Friendly	Albirex Niigata (S) (Japan)	8–0	Singapore U21 Team	Jurong East Stadium
	Ryota Nakai 3', 10'; 8' (o.g.); Tsubasa Sano 19', 39'; Kento Nagasaki 65'; Yanagi Yasutaka 86', 90'

15 October 2017 Friendly	Albirex Niigata (S)	6–1	Singapore U17 Team	Jurong East Stadium
	Ryuya Motoda 33', 42', 60', 83'; Hiroyoshi Kamata 65'; Kenya Kodama 73'

27 October 2017 Friendly	Albirex Niigata (S) (Japan)	2–2	(Singapore) NFA U18	Jurong East Stadium
		Report	Ryuya Motoda 47' (pen.); Yosuke Yamazaki 59'

11 October 2017 Friendly	Albirex Niigata (S) (Japan)	1–0	(Singapore) Young Lions	Jurong East Stadium
	Yasutaka Yanagi 61'

== Team statistics ==
=== Appearances and goals ===
No.	Pos.	Player	Sleague		Singapore Cup		League Cup		Total	
No.	Pos.	Player	Apps.	Goals	Apps.	Goals	Apps.	Goals	Apps.	Goals
1	GK	(Japan) Shuhei Yamada	1	0	0(1)	0	0	0	1(1)	0
2	DF	(Japan) Tomoki Menda	12(3)	0	3	0	0	0	15(3)	0
3	DF	(Japan) Takuya Akiyama	24	1	4	0	5	1	33	1
4	DF	(Japan) Yuki Yamanouchi	4(5)	0	1(1)	0	0(1)	0	5(7)	0
5	DF	(Japan) Naofumi Tanaka	24	5	5	1	5	0	34	6
6	MF	(Japan) Shuto Inaba	24	2	5	0	5	0	34	2
7	MF	(Japan) Ryota Nakai	20(2)	11	5	1	5	1	30(2)	13
8	FW	(Japan) Hiroyoshi Kamata	24	4	5	1	5	0	34	5
9	MF	(Japan) Tsubasa Sano	21	26	3	1	5	4	29	31
10	MF	(Japan) Kento Nagasaki	24	11	5	5	5	1	34	16
11	FW	(Japan) Shoichiro Sakamoto	15(8)	5	3(1)	1	5	1	23(9)	7
13	FW	(Japan) Yasutaka Yanagi	22	1	5	1	5	0	32	2
14	MF	(Japan) Ryuya Motoda	10(9)	3	2(1)	1	0(4)	0	12(14)	4
15	DF	(Japan) Shoma Kondo	1(4)	0	0(3)	1	0(1)	0	1(8)	1
16	DF	(Japan) Rui Kumada	13(11)	1	3(2)	1	1(4)	0	17(17)	2
17	DF	(Japan) Satoru Matsuki	0	0	0	0	0	0	0	0
18	FW	(Japan) Minoru Iwaki	0	0	0	0	0	0	0	0
19	MF	(Japan) Kenya Kodama	0	0	0	0	0(1)	0	0(1)	0
20	MF	(Japan) Yuki Kataoka	0	0	0	0	0	0	0	0
21	GK	(Japan) Yosuke Nozawa (captain)	22	0	5	0	5	0	32	0
22	GK	(Japan) Junpei Yamada	1	0	0	0	0	0	1	0
23	MF	(Japan) Kouki Sato	3(9)	0	0(3)	0	4(1)	0	7(13)	0
24	FW	(Japan) Yusuke Yamazaki	0	0	0	0	0	0	0	0

== Competitions ==
=== Overview ===
Competition	Record							
Competition	P	W	D	L	GF	GA	GD	Win %
S.League	24	20	2	2	70	16	+54	83.33
Singapore Cup	5	4	1	0	14	5	+9	80.00
League Cup	5	4	1	0	8	0	+8	80.00
Total	34	28	4	2	92	21	+71	82.35

=== S.League ===
Win Draw Loss

26 February 2017 Round 1	Albirex Niigata (S) (Japan)	2–1	Tampines Rovers	Kallang
	Shoichiro Sakamoto 74', 82'	Report	Ryutaro Megumi 36' (yellow card) 84' Ivan Jakov Džoni (penalty missed); Madhu Mohana (yellow card) 24' (red card) 88'; Daniel Bennett (yellow card) 57'; Yasir Hanapi (yellow card) 49, 64' (yellow-red card); Son Yong Chan (yellow card) 90'; Ismadi Mukhtar (red card) 90'	Stadium: National Stadium, Singapore; Attendance: 15,480; Referee: Sukhbir Singh

4 March 2017 Round 2	Young Lions (Singapore)	0–5	(Japan) Albirex Niigata (S)	Jalan Besar Stadium
	Tsubasa Sano 16', 75'; Takuya Akiyama 18'; Kento Nagasaki 38'; Ryota Nakai 57'	Report	Hami Syahin (yellow card) 30'; Muhelmy Suhaimi (yellow card) 52'	Attendance: 1,728; Referee: Jansen Foo

9 March 2017 Round 3	Albirex Niigata (S) (Japan)	2–0	(Brunei) DPMM FC	Jurong East Stadium
	Ryuya Motoda 75'; Ryota Nakai 87'		Yura Indera Putera (yellow card) 30'	Attendance: 1,413; Referee: W Ravisanthiran

1 April 2017 Round 4 (Rescheduled)	Home United	2–2	(Japan) Albirex Niigata (S)	Bishan Stadium
	Stipe Plazibat 33'; Faris Ramli 36'; Izzdin Shafiq (yellow card) 74'; Sirina Camara (yellow card) 87'	Report	Tsubasa Sano 45'; Kento Nagasaki 87' (pen.); Ryota Nakai (yellow card) 90'	Attendance: 2,143; Referee: W Ravisanthiran

14 April 2017 Round 5	Albirex Niigata (S) (Japan)	2–0	Hougang United	Jalan Besar Stadium
	Tsubasa Sano 56', 89'; Naofumi Tanaka (yellow card) 31'		Nazrul Nazari (yellow card) 63'; Fabian Kwok (yellow card) 73'	Attendance: 2,011; Referee: Sukhbir Singh

21 April 2017 Round 6	Balestier Khalsa	0–3	(Japan) Albirex Niigata (S)	Jalan Besar Stadium
	Raihan Rahman (yellow card) 42'; Shah Hirul (yellow card) 45'		Hiroyoshi Kamata 23'; Tsubasa Sano 64'; Ryota Nakai 70'	Attendance: 802; Referee: Muhd Taqi

29 April 2017 Round 7	Albirex Niigata (S) (Japan)	4–2	Warriors FC	Jurong East Stadium
	Shoichiro Sakamoto 6' (yellow card) 28'; Tsubasa Sano 14', 60'; Kento Nagasaki 52'; Tomoki Menda (red card) 44'		Jordan Webb 67' (pen.); Shahril Ishak 77'; Baihakki Khaizan (yellow card) 19'; Poh Yi Feng (yellow card) 51'	Attendance: 2,255; Referee: Farhad Mohd

11 May 2017 Round 8 (Rescheduled)	Geylang International	0–1	(Japan) Albirex Niigata (S)	Jalan Besar Stadium
	Nor Azli Yusoff (yellow card) 90'		Ryota Nakai 53'	Attendance: 1,145; Referee: W Ravisanthiran

21 May 2017 Round 9	Tampines Rovers	1–4	(Japan) Albirex Niigata (S)	Jurong West Stadium
	Son Yong Chan 71'; Shahdan Sulaiman (yellow card) 29'; Shakir Hamzah (yellow card) 43' (yellow card) 53' (yellow-red card); Fazli Ayob (yellow card) 50'		Naofumi Tanaka 27' 90'; Tsubasa Sano 47' (pen.) 78'; Shoichiro Sakamoto (yellow card) 53'	Attendance: 1,052; Referee: Nathan Chan

26 May 2017 Round 10	Albirex Niigata (S) (Japan)	8–0	(Singapore) Young Lions	Jurong East Stadium
	Tsubasa Sano 6' 36' 77' 78' 90'; Kento Nagasaki 9' 73'; Ryota Nakai 17'		Shahrin Saberin (yellow card) 66'; Taufik Suparno (penalty missed) 90	Referee: Ahmad A'Qashah

16 June 2017 Round 11	Albirex Niigata (S) (Japan)	4–0	(Brunei) DPMM FC	Jurong East Stadium
	Tsubasa Sano 9'; Ryota Nakai 34'; Rui Kumada 50'; Naofumi Tanaka 86'		Haizul Rani Metusin (yellow card) 20'; Vincent Reyes (yellow card) 45'	Attendance: 1,024; Referee: Farhad Mohd

23 June 2017 Round 12	Albirex Niigata (S) (Japan)	0–2	Home United	Jalan Besar Stadium
	Yasutaka Yanagi (red card) 65'; Ryota Nakai (yellow card) 90'		Stipe Plazibat 32' 90+4' (pen.); Abdil Qaiyyim (yellow card) 24'; Izzdin Shafiq (yellow card) 84'	Attendance: 2,717; Referee: Muhd Taqi

3 July 2017 Round 13	Hougang United	2–1	(Japan) Albirex Niigata	Hougang Stadium
	Pablo Rodriguez 26'; Fairoz Hasan 47'		Ryota Nakai 10' (pen.)	Attendance: 980; Referee: Muhd Syahir

26 July 2017 Round 14	Albirex Niigata (S) (Japan)	2–1	Balestier Khalsa	Jurong East Stadium
	Tsubasa Sano 59'; Kento Nagasaki 68'; Shuto Inaba (yellow card) 53'		Aung Kyaw Naing 89'; Huzaifah Aziz (yellow card) 49'	Attendance: 1,849; Referee: Ahmad A'Qashah

29 July 2017 Round 15	Warriors FC	1–2	(Japan) Albirex Niigata (S)	Choa Chu Kang Stadium
	Andrei Ciolacu 45'; Kento Fukuda (yellow card) 34'; Emmeric Ong (yellow card) 62'; Baihakki Khaizan (yellow card) 83'		Kento Nagasaki 5'; Shuto Inaba 90'	Attendance: 1,598; Referee: Muhd Taqi

5 August 2017 Round 16	Albirex Niigata (S) (Japan)	5–0	Geylang International	Jurong East Stadium
	Shoichiro Sakamoto 6' (yellow card) 41'; Ryuya Motoda 15' 44' (pen.); Kento Nagasaki 31'; Tsubasa Sano 58'		Al-Qaasimy Rahman (yellow card) 17' (yellow card) 43' (yellow-red card); Gabriel Quak (yellow card) 41'; Safirul Sulaiman (yellow card) 84'	Attendance: 2,244; Referee: Muhd Zulfiqar

19 August 2017 Round 17	Albirex Niigata (S) (Japan)	4–0	Tampines Rovers	Jurong East Stadium
	Kento Nagasaki 12'; Ryota Nakai 16', 83'; Yasutaka Yanagi 22'		Fahrudin Mustafic (yellow card) 30'	Attendance: 1,202; Referee: Nathan Chan

8 September 2017 Round 18	Young Lions (Singapore)	0–1	(Japan) Albirex Niigata (S)	Jalan Besar Stadium
			Shuto Inaba 33'; Tsubasa Sano (red card) 51'	Attendance: 1,592; Referee: Farhad Mohd

16 September 2017 Round 19	DPMM FC (Brunei)	0–1	(Japan) Albirex Niigata (S)	Hassanal Bolkiah National Stadium
	Rafael Ramazotti (yellow card) 42'; Adi Said (yellow card) 43'; Helmi Zambin (yellow card) 52'; Azwan Ali (yellow card) 56'		Naofumi Tanaka 26'; Rui Kumada (yellow card) 50'; Takuya Akiyama (yellow card) 53'	Attendance: 781; Referee: G Letchman

19 September 2017 Round 20	Home United	1–1	(Japan) Albirex Niigata (S)	Bishan Stadium
	Adam Swandi 72'; Faris Ramli (yellow card) 40'; Song Uiyoung (yellow card) 77'		Naofumi Tanaka 3'	Attendance: 2,258; Referee: Muhd Taqi

19 October 2017 Round 21	Albirex Niigata (S) (Japan)	1–0	Hougang United	Jurong East Stadium
	Ryota Nakai 81'		Nurhilmi Jasni (yellow card) 90'	Referee: W Ravisanthiran

26 October 2017 Round 22	Balestier Khalsa	0–3	(Japan) Albirex Niigata (S)	Toa Payoh Stadium
			Tsubasa Sano 13'; Hiroyoshi Kamata 39'; Ryota Nakai 89'; Shuto Inaba (yellow card) 41'	Referee: Muhd Syahir

3 November 2017 Round 23	Albirex Niigata (S) (Japan)	5–1	Warriors FC	Jalan Besar Stadium
	Tsubasa Sano 13' (pen.) 16' 77' 87' (pen.); Hiroyoshi Kamata 20'; Shoichiro Sakamoto (yellow card) 62'		Shahril Ishak 42' (pen.); Hyrulnizam Juma'at (yellow card) 12'; Emmeric Ong (yellow card) 45'; Ho Wai Loon (yellow card) 56'; Andrei-Cosmin Ciolacu (yellow card) 86'	Referee: G Letchman

17 November 2017 Round 24	Geylang International	2–7	(Singapore) Albirex Niigata (S)	Jalan Besar Stadium
	Shahfiq Ghani 45' (pen.); Yuki Ichikawa 78'; Victor Coto (yellow card) 45'; Ricardo Sendra (yellow card) 59'; Ifwat Ismail (yellow card) 87'		Kento Nagasaki 14', 66'; Hiroyoshi Kamata 29'; Tsubasa Sano 31', 44', 60'; Yasutaka Yanagi 74'	Referee: Nathan Chan

Pos	Team	Pld	W	D	L	GF	GA	GD	Pts	Qualification
1	(Japan) Albirex Niigata (S) (Note: The two foreign clubs – Albirex Niigata (S) and DPMM FC – as well as the Football Association of Singapore (FAS) under-21 team, Young Lions, are not eligible for any AFC competition spots.) (C)	24	20	2	2	70	16	+54	62	
2	Tampines Rovers	24	17	3	4	48	20	+28	54	Qualification to AFC Champions League Preliminary Round 1 or AFC Cup Group Stage
3	Home United	24	15	5	4	58	26	+32	50	Qualification to AFC Cup Group Stage
4	Geylang International	24	11	3	10	32	37	−5	36	
5	Warriors FC	24	9	7	8	33	36	−3	34	

Source: S.League
Rules for classification: 1) points; 2) goal difference; 3) number of goals scored; 4) number of wins
(C) Champions

=== Singapore Cup ===
==== Quarter-final ====
Win Draw Loss

10 August 2017 Quarter Final Leg 1	Tampines Rovers	1–5	(Japan) Albirex Niigata (S)	Tampines Hub
	Shahdan Sulaiman 90+2' (pen.); Son Yong Chan (yellow card) 48'; Fahrudin Mustafic (yellow card) 51'		Kento Nagasaki 26', 59'; Rui Kumada 33'; Shoma Kondo 83'; Shoichiro Sakamoto 84'; Naofumi Tanaka (yellow card) 80'; Koki Sato (yellow card) 81'; Takuya Akiyama (yellow card) 90+1'	Referee: Farhad Mohamed

13 August 2017 Quarter Final Leg 2	Albirex Niigata (S) (Japan)	2–0	Tampines Rovers	Jurong East Stadium
	Naofumi Tanaka 30'; Ryuya Motoda 45'			Referee: Jansen Foo

Albirex won 7–1 on aggregate.

==== Semi-final ====
27 September 2017 Semi Final Leg 1	Albirex Niigata (S) (Japan)	3–1	Home United	Jurong East Stadium
	Ryota Nakai 4'; Hiroyoshi Kamata 58'; Kento Nagasaki 76'; Yasutaka Yanagi (yellow card) 27'; Tomoki Menda (yellow card) 78'		Faris Ramli 18' (yellow card) 34'; Juma'at Jantan (yellow card) 51'; Song Uiyoung (yellow card) 69'; Irfan Fandi (yellow card) 75'; Stipe Plazibat (penalty missed) 27	Referee: Ahmad A'Qashah

30 September 2017 Semi Final Leg 2	Home United	1–2	(Japan) Albirex Niigata (S)	Bishan Stadium
	Faris Ramli 45' (pen.); Abdil Qaiyyim (yellow card) 42'; Adam Swandi (yellow card) 61'		Kento Nagasaki 83'; Takuya Akiyama 88' (yellow card) 45'

Albirex won 5–2 on aggregate.

==== Final ====
25 November 2017 Final	Albirex Niigata (S) (Japan)	2–2 (a.e.t.) (3–1 p)	(Philippines) Global Cebu F.C.	Jalan Besar Stadium
	Tsubasa Sano 32'; Kento Nagasaki 95'		Wesley 48'; Paulo Salenga 112'	Referee: Muhd Taqi

Albirex won on penalty

=== Singapore TNP League Cup ===
Pos	Team	Pld	W	D	L	GF	GA	GD	Pts	Qualification
1	Albirex Niigata (S)	3	2	1	0	0	0	0	7	Advance to semi-final
2	Warriors	3	1	1	1	6	7	−1	4	Advance to semi-final
3	Hougang United	3	0	3	0	3	3	0	3	
4	Home United	3	0	1	2	4	6	−2	1	

Source: S.League

==== Group matches ====
Win Draw Loss

7 July 2017 Group Stage M1	Hougang United	0–0	(Japan) Albirex Niigata (S)	Hougang Stadium
				Referee: W Ravisanthiran

10 July 2017 Group Stage M2	Albirex Niigata (S) (Japan)	2–0	Warriors FC	Jurong East Stadium
	Shoichiro Sakamoto 3'; Kento Nagasaki 41'		Baihakki Khaizan (yellow card) 43'; Andrei Ciolacu (yellow card) 51'; Firdaus Kasman (yellow card) 61'	Referee: Sukhbir Singh

13 July 2017 Group Stage M3	Home United	0–1	(Japan) Albirex Niigata (S)	Jalan Besar Stadium
	Hariss Harun (yellow card) 26'; Sufianto Salleh (yellow card) 57'		Tsubasa Sano 53'	Referee: G Letchman

==== Knock out Stage ====
18 July 2017 Semi Final	Albirex Niigata (S) (Japan)	4–0	Geylang International	Jurong East Stadium
	Takuya Akiyama 28'; Tsubasa Sano 79' 82'; Ryota Nakai 88'		Amy Recha (yellow card) 13'; Syazwan Buhari (yellow card) 62'; Isa Halim (yellow card) 63'; Al-Qaasimy Rahman (yellow card) 65'; Shawal Anuar (yellow card) 72'	Referee: Ahmad A'Qashah

21 July 2017 Final	Albirex Niigata (S) (Japan)	1–0 (a.e.t.)	Warriors FC	Jalan Besar Stadium
	Tsubasa Sano 110'; Hiroyoshi Kamata (yellow card) 39'		Kento Fukuda (yellow card) 28'; Syaqir Sulaiman (yellow card) 44'; Shahril Ishak (yellow card) 90'; Andrei-Cosmin Ciolacu (yellow card) 91'; Firdaus Kasman (yellow card) 106'; Shaiful Esah (yellow card) 120'	Referee: G Letchman
