= 2017 Warriors FC season =

Warriors
2017 season
- Chairman: (Singapore) Philip Lam Tin Sing
- Head coach: (Singapore) Razif Onn
- Stadium: Choa Chu Kang Stadium
- S.League: Not started
- Singapore Cup: Not started

The 2017 season was Warriors' 22nd consecutive season in the top flight of Singapore football and in the S.League. Along with the S.League, the club also competed in the Prime League, the Singapore Cup and the Singapore League Cup.

== Squad ==
=== S.League squad ===
As of 24 February 2017.

Squad No.	Name	Nationality	Date of birth (age)	Previous club
Goalkeepers
1	Jasper Chan	(Singapore)	7 November 1988 (age 38)	(Singapore) Eunos Crescent (NFL)
18	Zainol Gulam	(Singapore)	4 February 1992 (age 34)	Youth Team
22	Hyrulnizam Juma'at	(Singapore)	14 November 1986 (age 40)	(Singapore) Home United
Defenders
2	Zulfadli Zainal	(Singapore)	26 April 1988 (age 38)	(Singapore) Tampines Rovers
3	Syaqir Sulaiman	(Singapore)	12 August 1986 (age 40)	(Singapore) Hougang United
4	Hafiz Osman	(Singapore)	15 February 1984 (age 42)	(Singapore) Geylang International
5	Kento Fukuda	(Japan)	15 May 1990 (age 36)	(Singapore) Geylang International
13	Baihakki Khaizan	(Singapore)	31 January 1984 (age 42)	(Malaysia) Johor Darul Ta'zim II F.C.
20	Ang Zhiwei	(Singapore)	2 August 1989 (age 37)	(Singapore) Home United
24	Ho Wai Loon	(Singapore)	20 August 1993 (age 33)	(Singapore) Balestier Khalsa
Midfielders
6	Ridhuan Muhammad	(Singapore)	6 May 1984 (age 42)	(Singapore) Tampines Rovers
7	Shaiful Esah	(Singapore)	12 May 1986 (age 40)	(Singapore) Tampines Rovers
8	Emmeric Ong	(Singapore)	25 January 1991 (age 35)	(Singapore) LionsXII
11	Fazli Jaffar	(Singapore)	9 May 1983 (age 43)	(Singapore) Hougang United
14	Poh Yi Feng	(Singapore)	15 November 1986 (age 40)	(Singapore) Balestier Khalsa
17	Shahril Ishak	(Singapore)	23 January 1984 (age 42)	(Malaysia) Johor Darul Ta'zim II F.C.
19	Hafiz Nor	(Singapore)	22 August 1988 (age 38)	(Singapore) Geylang International
21	Firdaus Kasman	(Singapore)	24 January 1988 (age 38)	(Singapore) Young Lions FC
23	Suria Prakash	(Singapore)	23 December 1993 (age 32)	(Singapore) SAFSA
25	Sharin Majid	(Singapore)	31 March 1995 (age 31)	Youth Team
Strikers
9	Andrei Ciolacu	(Romania)	9 August 1992 (age 34)	(Romania) ASA 2013 Târgu Mureș
10	Jordan Webb	(Canada)	24 March 1988 (age 38)	(Singapore) Tampines Rovers
12	Samuel Benjamin	(Singapore)	31 March 1995 (age 31)	(Singapore) Yishun Sentek Mariners (NFL Club)
15	Fadhil Noh	(Singapore)	4 March 1989 (age 37)	(Singapore) Balestier Khalsa
16	Nur Asyidiq	(Singapore)	1 September 1993 (age 33)	(Singapore) Yishun Sentek Mariners (NFL Club)

=== Prime League squad ===
As of 24 February 2017.

Squad No.	Name	Nationality	Date of birth (age)	Previous club
Goalkeepers
36	Bryan Quek	(Singapore)	5 June 1995 (age 31)	Free Agent
40	Mukundan Maran	(Singapore)	23 April 1996 (age 30)	Free Agent
Defenders
30	Fazli Shafie	(Singapore)	6 June 1997 (age 29)	Free Agent
33	Bryan Tan Yu Ru	(Singapore)	7 May 1996 (age 30)	(Singapore) Tampines Rovers Prime League
34	Hariz Zulkefli	(Singapore)		
38	Aniq Iskandar	(Singapore)	30 October 1996 (age 30)	(Singapore) Prime League
48	Daniel Shafiq	(Singapore)		(Singapore) NFA U18
Midfielders
27	Gautam Selvamany	(Singapore)		(Singapore) Tampines Rovers Prime League
29	Andin Addie	(Singapore)	30 January 1997 (age 29)	(Singapore) NFA U17
32	Danial Zulkifli	(Singapore)	19 May 1999 (age 27)	(Singapore) Prime League
42	Suhairi Sabri	(Singapore)	23 April 1995 (age 31)	(Singapore) Prime League
43	Syahmi Zuhaily	(Singapore)	25 June 1997 (age 29)	
44	Mikhail Ramdan	(Singapore)	22 February 1997 (age 29)	(Singapore) NFA U18
Strikers
26	Clay Silvas	(United States)	7 March 1998 (age 28)	(United States) Sacramento Republic FC U18
28	Gerald Gwee	(Singapore)		(Singapore) Tampines Rovers Prime League
31	A Pavithran	(Singapore)	23 May 1996 (age 30)	(Singapore) Balestier Khalsa Prime League

== Coaching staff ==
Position	Name	Ref.
Head coach	(Singapore) Razif Onn	
Assistant coach	(Singapore) Muhammad Effendi Bin Rahmat	
Assistant coach / Goalkeeping Coach	(Singapore) Lee Bee Seng	
Team manager	(Singapore) Eugene Cheang	
Fitness trainer	(Singapore) Silas Abdul Karim Bin Noor Shah	
Sports trainer	(Singapore) Benjamin Bhagawat	

== Transfers ==
=== Pre-season transfers ===
==== In ====
Position	Player	Transferred From	Ref
GK	(Singapore) Hyrulnizam Juma'at	(Singapore) Home United	
DF	(Singapore) Ang Zhiwei	(Singapore) Home United	
DF	(Singapore) Ho Wai Loon	(Singapore) Balestier Khalsa	
DF	(Singapore) Baihakki Khaizan	(Malaysia) Johor Darul Ta'zim II	
DF	(Singapore) Zulfadhli Emran	(Singapore) Bishan Barx FC (NFL Club)	
DF	(Singapore) Sharin Majid	Prime League	
MF	(Singapore) Shahril Ishak	(Malaysia) Johor Darul Ta'zim II	
MF	(Singapore) Firdaus Kasman	(Singapore) Young Lions	
FW	(Singapore) Fadhil Noh	(Singapore) Balestier Khalsa	
FW	(Singapore) Samuel Benjamin	(Singapore) Yishun Sentek Mariners FC (NFL Club)	
FW	(Singapore) Nur Asyidiq	(Singapore) Yishun Sentek Mariners FC (NFL Club)	
FW	(Canada) Jordan Webb	(Singapore) Tampines Rovers	
FW	(United States) Clay Silvas	(United States) Sacramento Republic FC U18	
FW	(Netherlands) Joël Tshibamba	(Slovenia) FC Koper	

==== Out ====
Position	Player	Transferred To	Ref
GK	(Singapore) Yazid Yasin	(Singapore) Gymkhana FC (NFL Division 2)	
GK	(Singapore) Shahul Rayyan	(Singapore) SAFSA (NFL Division 1)	
DF	(Singapore) Madhu Mohana	(Singapore) Tampines Rovers	
DF	(Singapore) Ismail Yunos	Retired	
DF	(Singapore) Jeremy Chiang	Released	
MF	(Singapore) Ignatius Ang	(Singapore) SAFSA (NFL Division 1)	
MF	(Singapore) Andy Ahmad	(Singapore) SAFSA (NFL Division 1)	
MF	(Singapore) Hafsyar Farkhan	(Singapore) Tiong Bahru FC (NFL Division 1)	
MF	(Singapore) Hafiz Rahim	(Singapore) Tampines Rovers	
MF	(Singapore) Hafiz Sulaiman	(Singapore) Young Lions FC	
FW	(France) Jonathan Behe	(Malaysia) Sabah	
FW	(Croatia) Nikola Rak	(Croatia) NK Lučko	
FW	(Croatia) Marijan Šuto	(Singapore) Home United	To Prime League

=== Mid-season transfer ===
==== In ====
Position	Player	Transferred From	Ref
MF	(Singapore) Suria Prakash	(Singapore) SAFSA (NFL Club)	
FW	(Romania) Andrei Ciolacu	(Romania) ASA 2013 Târgu Mureș	

==== Out ====
Position	Player	Transferred To	Ref
FW	(Netherlands) Joël Tshibamba		
DF	(Singapore) Zulfadhli Emran		

== Friendlies ==
=== Pre-season friendlies ===
Win Draw Loss

11 February 2017	Albirex Niigata (S) (Singapore)	1–0	(Singapore) Warriors FC	Choa Chu Kang Stadium
	Takuya Akiyama 85'

=== Asia Clubs Pre-season Championship 2017 ===
1 February 2017 Match 1	National Defense Ministry FC (Cambodia)	2–1	(Singapore) Warriors FC	Olympic Stadium (Phnom Penh)
1900	Choe Myong-ho; Ri Hyok-chol		Goal

2 February 2017 Match 2	Svay Rieng FC (Cambodia)	4–1	(Singapore) Warriors FC	Olympic Stadium (Phnom Penh)
1600	Sareth Kryia 5'; Samoeur Pidor 34'; Chidera Ononiwu 45+2'; Chea Samnang 77'		Syaqir Sulaiman 24'

3 February 2017 Match 3	Petaling Jaya Rangers (Malaysia)	1–1	(Singapore) Warriors FC	Olympic Stadium (Phnom Penh)
1600	Zamri Hassan		Goal

5 February 2017 Placing or Final	Petaling Jaya Rangers (Malaysia)	0–2	(Singapore) Warriors FC	Olympic Stadium (Phnom Penh)

=== In season friendlies ===
15 March 2017 Friendly	Warriors FC (Singapore)	v	(Japan) Albirex Niigata U18	Choa Chu Kang Stadium

11 September 2017 Friendly	Warriors FC (Singapore)	2–4	(Malaysia) JDT II	Choa Chu Kang Stadium
	Amer Saidin 3' (o.g.); Shaiful Esah 39'		Emmeric Ong 10' (0.g); Rozaimi Abdul Rahman 53'; Nicolás Fernández 59' (pen.); Che Rashid Che Halim 61'

=== Post season friendlies ===
24 November 2017 Friendly	Warriors FC (Singapore)	0–4	(Malaysia) Negeri Sembilan FA	Choa Chu Kang Stadium

== Team statistics ==
=== Appearances and goals ===
Numbers in parentheses denote appearances as substitute.

No.	Pos.	Player	Sleague		Singapore Cup		League Cup		Total	
No.	Pos.	Player	Apps.	Goals	Apps.	Goals	Apps.	Goals	Apps.	Goals
1	GK	(Singapore) Jasper Chan	4	0	0	0	1	0	5	0
2	DF	(Singapore) Zulfadli Zainal Abidin	10	0	1	0	3(1)	0	14(1)	0
3	DF	(Singapore) Syaqir Sulaiman	13(4)	0	1	0	3(1)	0	17(5)	0
4	DF	(Singapore) Hafiz Osman	12(1)	0	1	0	2	0	15(1)	0
5	DF	(Japan) Kento Fukuda	24	2	1	0	5	0	30	2
6	MF	(Singapore) Ridhuan Muhammad	8(10)	2	1	0	1(2)	0	10(12)	2
7	MF	(Singapore) Shaiful Esah	6(5)	1	0	0	2(3)	0	8(8)	1
8	MF	(Singapore) Emmeric Ong	18(1)	0	1	0	4	1	23(1)	1
9	FW	(Romania) Andrei Ciolacu	10(1)	3	0	0	5	4	18(1)	7
10	FW	(Canada) Jordan Webb	20(2)	7	0	0	5	1	25(2)	8
11	MF	(Singapore) Fazli Jaffar	7(5)	0	0(1)	0	2	0	9(6)	0
13	DF	(Singapore) Baihakki Khaizan	19(1)	0	1	0	3	0	24(1)	0
14	MF	(Singapore) Poh Yi Feng	4(6)	0	0(1)	0	1	0	5(7)	0
15	FW	(Singapore) Fadhil Noh	6(7)	0	0	0	1(1)	0	7(8)	0
16	FW	(Singapore) Nur Asyidiq	0(1)	0	0	0	0	0	0(1)	0
17	MF	(Singapore) Shahril Ishak (captain)	23(1)	10	1	0	4	4	28(1)	14
18	GK	(Singapore) Zainol Gulam	5(1)	0	0	0	0	0	5(1)	0
19	MF	(Singapore) Hafiz Nor	17(4)	2	1	1	2(2)	0	20(6)	3
20	DF	(Singapore) Ang Zhiwei	6	0	0	0	1	0	7	0
21	MF	(Singapore) Firdaus Kasman	11(3)	0	0	0	1(2)	0	12(5)	0
22	GK	(Singapore) Hyrulnizam Juma'at	15	0	1	0	3	0	19	0
23	DF	(Singapore) Suria Prakash	3	1	0	0	0	0	3	1
24	DF	(Singapore) Ho Wai Loon	16(2)	0	0	0	5	1	21(2)	1
25	DF	(Singapore) Sharin Majid	0	0	0	0	0	0	0	0
26	FW	(United States) Clay Silvas	0	0	0(1)	0	0	0	0	0
32	FW	(Singapore) Danial Zulkifli	0	0	0	0	0(1)	0	0(1)	0
38	MF	(Singapore) Aniq Iskandar	0	0	0	0	0(1)	0	0(1)	0
40	GK	(Singapore) Mukundan Maran	0	0	0	0	1	0	1	0
Players who have played this season but had left the club or on loan to other club
9	FW	(Republic of the Congo) Joël Tshibamba	7(1)	4	1	0	0	0	8(1)	4
23	DF	(Singapore) Zulfadhli Emran	0	0	0	0	0	0	0	0

== Competitions ==
=== Overview ===
Competition	Record							
Competition	P	W	D	L	GF	GA	GD	Win %
S.League	21	8	6	7	29	29	+0	38.10
Singapore Cup	1	0	0	1	1	4	−3	0.00
League Cup	5	2	1	2	11	9	+2	40.00
Total					—			

=== S.League ===
Win Draw Loss

28 February 2017 Round 1	Balestier Khalsa (Singapore)	1–2	(Singapore) Warriors FC	Toa Payoh Stadium
	Raihan Rahman 27' (pen.) (yellow card) 77'; Fadli Kamis (yellow card) 24'; Hanafi Salleh (yellow card) 57'; Huzaifa Aziz (yellow card) 61'		Jordan Webb 49' (pen.); Shaiful Esah 88' (yellow card) 26'; Ridhuan Muhamad (yellow card) 23'; Hafiz Osman (yellow card) 34'	Attendance: 1,975; Referee: G Letchman

10 March 2017 Round 2	Warriors FC (Singapore)	1–1	(Singapore) Geylang International	Choa Chu Kang Stadium
	Kento Fukuda 55'; Jasper Chan (yellow card) 81'		Víctor Coto Ortega 77'; Isa Halim (yellow card) 45'; Víctor Coto Ortega (yellow card) 66'	Attendance: 1,681; Referee: Farhad Mohd

1 April 2017 Round 3	Tampines Rovers (Singapore)	0–1	(Singapore) Warriors FC	Jurong West Stadium
	Ismadi Mukhtar (yellow card) 42'	Report	Jordan Webb 28'; Baihakki Khaizan (yellow card) 22'; Hafiz Osman (yellow card) 45'	Referee: G Letchman

8 April 2017 Round 4	Warriors FC (Singapore)	4–3	(Singapore) Young Lions	Choa Chu Kang Stadium
	Joël Tshibamba 46', 90' (yellow card) 90'; Shahril Ishak 82'; Jordan Webb 87'; Syaqir Sulaiman (yellow card) 13'; Baihakki Khaizan (yellow card) 63'; Poh Yi Feng (yellow card) 66'		Muhaimin Suhaimi 51'; Taufik Suparno 54' (pen.) 78'; Jordan Chan (yellow card) 57'; Shahrin Saberin (yellow card) 79'; Zulqarnaen Suzliman (yellow card) 87'; Hami Syahin (yellow card) 87'	Attendance: 1,608; Referee: Sukhbir Singh

15 April 2017 Round 5	Brunei DPMM	3–5	(Singapore) Warriors FC	Hassanal Bolkiah National Stadium
	Rafael Ramazotti 45', 84' (yellow card) 74'; Billy Mehmet 62'; Najib Tarif (yellow card) 51'; Awangku Fakharazzi (yellow card) 70'	Report	Jordan Webb 25', 56'; Kento Fukuda 73'; Ridhuan Muhammad 82'; Joël Tshibamba 87'; Ho Wai Loon (yellow card) 48'; Emmeric Ong (yellow card) 54'	Referee: Jansen Foo

22 April 2017 Round 6	Warriors FC (Singapore)	2–2	(Singapore) Home United	Choa Chu Kang Stadium
	Shahril Ishak 81' (pen.) 87'; Hyrulnizam Juma'at (yellow card) 5'; Firdaus Kasman (yellow card) 38'; Hafiz Osman (yellow card) 21' (red card) 70'; Joël Tshibamba (yellow card) 58'; Baihakki Khaizan (yellow card) 59'; Ho Wai Loon (yellow card) 79'		Stipe Plazibat 4' (pen.) 47'; Sirina Camara (yellow card) 19'; Hariss Harun (yellow card) 28'; Afiq Yunos (yellow card) 80'; Faris Ramli (yellow card) 90'; Irfan Fandi (yellow card) 90'	Attendance: 2,368; Referee: Ahmad A'Qashah

29 April 2017 Round 7	Albirex Niigata (S) (Singapore)	4–2	(Singapore) Warriors FC	Jurong East Stadium
	Shoichiro Sakamoto 6' (yellow card) 28'; Tsubasa Sano 14', 60'; Kento Nagasaki 52' (yellow card) 27'; Tomoki Menda (red card) 44'		Jordan Webb 67' (pen.); Shahril Ishak 77'; Baihakki Khaizan (yellow card) 19'; Poh Yi Feng (yellow card) 51'	Attendance: 2,255; Referee: Farhad Mohd

11 May 2017 Round 8	Warriors FC (Singapore)	0–2	(Singapore) Hougang United	Choa Chu Kang Stadium
	Jordan Webb (yellow card) 13'; Firdaus Kasman (yellow card) 20'; Syaqir Sulaiman (yellow card) 21'; Hafiz Osman (yellow card) 34' (yellow card) 88' (yellow-red card); Zulfadli Zainal Abidin (yellow card) 57'		Fumiya Kogure 53'; Fareez Farhan 90'; Nazrul Nazari (yellow card) 1'; Azhar Sairudin (yellow card) 13'	Attendance: 1,438; Referee: Farhad Mohamed

19 May 2017 Round 9	Warriors FC (Singapore)	1–0	(Singapore) Balestier Khalsa	Jalan Besar Stadium
	Joël Tshibamba 9'; Firdaus Kasman (yellow card) 39'; Syaqir Sulaiman (yellow card) 54'; Zulfadli Zainal Abidin (yellow card) 59'; Fadhil Noh (yellow card) 84'		Sheikh Abdul Hadi (red card) 39'; Huzaifah Aziz (yellow card) 57' (yellow card) 57' (yellow-red card)	Attendance: 1,648; Referee: Ahmad A'Qashah

16 June 2017 Round 10	Geylang International (Singapore)	0–2	(Singapore) Warriors FC	Jalan Besar Stadium
	Amy Recha (yellow card) 77'		Shahril Ishak 16' 20'; Baihakki Khaizan (yellow card) 12'; Fadhil Noh (yellow card) 34'	Attendance: 1,101; Referee: Sukhbir Singh

22 June 2017 Round 11	Warriors FC (Singapore)	0–1	(Singapore) Tampines Rovers	Choa Chu Kang Stadium
	Fazli Jaffar (yellow card) 40'; Zulfadli Zainal Abidin (yellow card) 82'		Shahdan Sulaiman 83' (pen.); Fazli Ayob (yellow card) 59'	Attendance: 1,528; Referee: G Letchman

28 June 2017 Round 12	Young Lions (Singapore)	0–0	(Singapore) Warriors FC	Jalan Besar Stadium
			Syaqir Sulaiman (yellow card) 75'	Attendance: 1,337; Referee: W Ravisanthiran

2 July 2017 Round 13	Warriors FC (Singapore)	1–0	Brunei DPMM	Choa Chu Kang Stadium
	Ridhuan Muhamad 54'; Andrei Ciolacu (penalty missed) 28; Zulfadli Zainal Abidin (yellow card) 41'; Firdaus Kasman (yellow card) 71'		Azwan Ali (yellow card) 31'; Vincent Salas (yellow card) 85'; Najib Tarif (red card) 90'	Attendance: 1,538; Referee: Ahmad A'Qashah

25 July 2017 Round 14	Home United (Singapore)	1–1	(Singapore) Warriors FC	Jalan Besar Stadium
	Irfan Fandi 12'; Hariss Harun (yellow card) 79'; Haziq Azman (yellow card) 85'		Shahril Ishak 45' (pen.); Baihakki Khaizan (yellow card) 25'; Syaqir Sulaiman (yellow card) 53'; Ho Wai Loon (yellow card) 25'; Kento Fukuda (yellow card) 83'	Attendance: 1,192; Referee: Sukhbir Singh

29 July 2017 Round 15	Warriors FC (Singapore)	1–2	(Singapore) Albirex Niigata (S)	Choa Chu Kang Stadium
	Andrei Ciolacu 45'; Kento Fukuda (yellow card) 34'; Emmeric Ong (yellow card) 62'; Baihakki Khaizan (yellow card) 83'		Kento Nagasaki 5'; Shuto Inaba 90'	Attendance: 1,598; Referee: Muhd Taqi

4 August 2017 Round 16	Hougang United (Singapore)	0–1	(Singapore) Warriors FC	Jalan Besar Stadium
			Shahril Ishak 6'; Hafiz Osman (yellow card) 58'; Andrei Ciolacu (yellow card) 61'	Attendance: 1,259; Referee: G Letchman

17 August 2017 Round 17	Balestier Khalsa (Singapore)	2–2	(Singapore) Warriors FC	Toa Payoh Stadium
	Hazzuwan Halim 8'; Fadli Kamis 58'; Zulkhair Mustaffa (yellow card) 35'		Andrei-Cosmin Ciolacu 43' (pen.); Hafiz Nor 56'	Attendance: 836; Referee: Muhd Syahir

15 September 2017 Round 18	Warriors FC (Singapore)	0–2	(Singapore) Geylang International	Choa Chu Kang Stadium
	Shaiful Esah (yellow card) 3'; Andrei-Cosmin Ciolacu (yellow card) 16'; Syaqir Sulaiman (yellow card) 64'; Baihakki Khaizan (yellow card) 90'		Shahfiq Ghani 78'; Shawal Anuar 86'; Nor Azli Yusoff (yellow card) 23'; Anders Aplin (yellow card) 52'; Isa Halim (yellow card) 90'	Attendance: 1,828; Referee: Sukhbir Singh

20 September 2017 Round 19	Tampines Rovers (Singapore)	1–1	(Singapore) Warriors FC	Jurong West Stadium
	Hafiz Abu Sujad 15'; Fahrudin Mustafic (yellow card) 90'		Shahril Ishak 57' (pen.) (yellow card) 45'; Baihakki Khaizan (yellow card) 64'; Hafiz Nor (yellow card) 72'; Syaqir Sulaiman (yellow card) 90'	Attendance: 1,325; Referee: W Ravisanthiran

14 October 2017 Round 20	Warriors FC (Singapore)	0–1	(Singapore) Young Lions	Choa Chu Kang Stadium
	Ho Wai Loon (yellow card) 90'		Haiqal Pashia 63'	Attendance: 1,608; Referee: W Ravisanthiran

21 October 2017 Round 21	Brunei DPMM	3–2	(Singapore) Warriors FC	Hassanal Bolkiah National Stadium
	Azwan Ali Rahman 35', 65'; Rafael Ramazotti 48'; Rosmin Kamis (yellow card) 29'; Azwan Saleh (yellow card) 76'; Hendra Azam (yellow card) 80'		Jordan Webb 24'; Shahril Ishak 81'; Baihakki Khaizan (yellow card) 66'; Fazli Jaffar (yellow card) 69'; Firdaus Kasman (yellow card) 88'	Referee: Jansen Foo

27 October 2017 Round 22	Warriors FC (Singapore)	2–1	(Singapore) Home United	Choa Chu Kang Stadium
	Andrei Ciolacu 27' (yellow card) 90'; Suria Prakash 36'; Ho Wai Loon (yellow card) 28'; Kento Fukuda (yellow card) 90'		Anumanthan Kumar 34'; Hariss Harun (yellow card) 49'; Hassan Sunny (yellow card) 90'	Referee: Farhad Mohamed

3 November 2017 Round 23	Albirex Niigata (S) (Singapore)	5–1	(Singapore) Warriors FC	Jalan Besar Stadium
	Tsubasa Sano 13' (pen.) 16' 77' 87' (pen.); Shoichiro Sakamoto (yellow card) 62'		Shahril Ishak 42' (pen.); Hyrulnizam Juma'at (yellow card) 12'; Emmeric Ong (yellow card) 45'; Ho Wai Loon (yellow card) 56'; Andrei-Cosmin Ciolacu (yellow card) 86'	Referee: G Letchman

17 November 2017 Round 24	Warriors FC (Singapore)	1–1	(Singapore) Hougang United	Choa Chu Kang Stadium
	Hafiz Nor 39'		Iqbal Hussain 17'

Pos	Team	Pld	W	D	L	GF	GA	GD	Pts	Qualification
3	Home United	24	15	5	4	58	26	+32	50	Qualification to AFC Cup Group Stage
4	Geylang International	24	11	3	10	32	37	−5	36	
5	Warriors FC	24	9	7	8	33	36	−3	34	
6	Hougang United	24	9	3	12	24	31	−7	30	
7	Balestier Khalsa	24	5	4	15	17	33	−16	19	

Source: S.League
Rules for classification: 1) points; 2) goal difference; 3) number of goals scored; 4) number of wins

=== Singapore Cup ===
Win Draw Loss

29 May 2017 Preliminary Round	Warriors FC (Singapore)	1–4	(Cambodia) Boeung Ket Angkor FC	Choa Chu Kang Stadium
	Hafiz Nor 78'; Baihakki Khaizan (yellow card) 61' (yellow card) 68' (yellow-red card)	Report	Esoh Paul Omogba 53'; Khoun Laboravy 55' 75' 84'; Hikaru Mizuno (yellow card) 39'	Referee: Nathan Chan

=== Singapore TNP League Cup ===
Pos	Team	Pld	W	D	L	GF	GA	GD	Pts	Qualification
1	Albirex Niigata (S)	3	2	1	0	0	0	0	7	Advance to semi-final
2	Warriors	3	1	1	1	6	7	−1	4	Advance to semi-final
3	Hougang United	3	0	3	0	3	3	0	3	
4	Home United	3	0	1	2	4	6	−2	1	

Source: S.League

==== Group matches ====
Win Draw Loss

7 July 2017 Group Stage M1	Warriors FC (Singapore)	4–3	(Singapore) Home United	Choa Chu Kang Stadium
	Andrei Ciolacu 22' (pen.) 64' 68'; Jordan Webb 76'; Hyrulnizam Juma'at (yellow card) 34'; Fazli Jaffar (yellow card) 70' (yellow card) 79' (yellow-red card); Shaiful Esah (yellow card) 90'		Stipe Plazibat 6'; Iqram Rifqi 15'; Hariss Harun 34' (pen.); Juma'at Jantan (yellow card) 21'	Referee: Muhd Taqi

10 July 2017 Group Stage M2	Albirex Niigata (S) (Singapore)	2–0	(Singapore) Warriors FC	Jurong East Stadium
	Shoichiro Sakamoto 3'; Kento Nagasaki 41'		Baihakki Khaizan (yellow card) 43'; Andrei Ciolacu (yellow card) 51'; Firdaus Kasman (yellow card) 61'	Referee: Sukhbir Singh

13 July 2017 Group Stage M3	Hougang United (Singapore)	2–2	(Singapore) Warriors FC	Hougang Stadium
	Fareez Farhan 35'; Pablo Rodríguez 57'; Fabien Kwok (yellow card) 62'		Shahril Ishak 6'; Ho Wai Loon 41'	Referee: Muhd Syahir

==== Knock out Stage ====
18 July 2017 Semi-final	Brunei DPMM	1–5	(Singapore) Warriors FC	Jalan Besar Stadium
	Vincent Salas (yellow card) 38'; Maududi Hilmi Kasmi (yellow card) 52'; Shahrazen Said 77'	Report	Emmeric Ong 26'; Shahril Ishak 26', 44', 70' (pen.); Emmeric Ong (yellow card) 26'; Andrei Ciolacu 53'	Referee: Farhad Mohd

21 July 2017 Final	Albirex Niigata (S) (Singapore)	1–0 (a.e.t.)	(Singapore) Warriors FC	Jalan Besar Stadium
	Tsubasa Sano 110'; Hiroyoshi Kamata (yellow card) 39'		Kento Fukuda (yellow card) 28'; Syaqir Sulaiman (yellow card) 44'; Shahril Ishak (yellow card) 90'; Andrei-Cosmin Ciolacu (yellow card) 91'; Firdaus Kasman (yellow card) 106'; Shaiful Esah (yellow card) 120'	Referee: G Letchman
