= 2017 Singapore Community Shield =

Albirex Niigata (S)	Tampines Rovers
2	1
- Date: 26 February 2017
- Venue: National Stadium, Singapore
- Referee: Sukhbir Singh (SIN)
- Attendance: 15,480

The 2017 Singapore Community Shield (also known as the Great Eastern Community Shield for sponsorship reasons) was the 10th edition of the Singapore Community Shield held on 26 February 2017 at National Stadium, between the winners of the previous season's S.League and Singapore Cup competitions. The match was contested by 2016 Singapore Cup winners Albirex Niigata (S) and 2016 S.League runners-up Tampines Rovers.

This was the first time whereby a Shield match was played at the new National Stadium after opening in 2014.

Albirex Niigata (S) won the Shield for the second consecutive time after defeating Tampines Rovers 2–1.

== Match ==
26 February 2017
18:00 SST

Albirex Niigata (S) (Japan)	v	Tampines Rovers
Shoichiro Sakamoto 74'; Shoichiro Sakamoto 82'		Ryutaro Megumi 36'

National Stadium, Singapore
Attendance: 15,480
Referee: Sukhbir Singh (Singapore)

Albirex Niigata (S)	Tampines Rovers

GK	21	(Japan) Yosuke Nozawa
DF	3	(Japan) Takuya Akiyama
DF	4	(Japan) Yuki Yamanouchi
DF	5	(Japan) Naofumi Tanaka
MF	6	(Japan) Shuto Inaba (c)
FW	7	(Japan) Ryota Nakai	(substituted off) 90'
FW	8	(Japan) Hiroyoshi Kamata
FW	9	(Japan) Tsubasa Sano	(substituted off) 60'
MF	10	(Japan) Kento Nagasaki
FW	13	(Japan) Yasutaka Yanagi
DF	16	(Japan) Rui Kumada	(substituted off) 60'
Substitutes:
GK	1	(Japan) Shuhei Yamada
GK	22	(Japan) Junpei Yamada
DF	15	(Japan) Shoma Kondo	(substituted on) 60'
MF	14	(Japan) Ryuya Motoda	(substituted on) 60'
MF	19	(Japan) Kenya Kodama
FW	23	(Japan) Kouki Sato
FW	11	(Japan) Shoichiro Sakamoto	(substituted on) 60'
Head coach:
(Japan) Kazuaki Yoshinaga

GK	1	(Singapore) Izwan Mahbud
DF	2	(Singapore) Ismadi Mukhtar	90'
DF	4	(Singapore) Mustafic Fahrudin		(substituted off) 86'
DF	5	(Singapore) Daniel Bennett
DF	6	(Singapore) Madhu Mohana	(c) (red card) 88'
MF	7	(South Korea) Son Yong Chan	(yellow card) 90'
MF	9	(Japan) Ryutaro Megumi	(yellow card) 84'
MF	13	(Singapore) Amirul Haziq		(substituted off) 32'
MF	18	(Singapore) Yasir Hanapi	(red card) 64'
FW	20	(Croatia) Ivan Džoni		(substituted off) 67'
FW	25	(Singapore) Irwan Shah
Substitutes:
GK	23	(Singapore) Joey Sim
GK	24	(Singapore) Haikal Hasnol
DF	3	(Singapore) Jufri Taha		(substituted on) 86'
DF	15	(Singapore) Imran Sahib
MF	17	(Singapore) Jamil Ali
MF	21	(Singapore) Hafiz Rahim		(substituted on) 32'
FW	19	(Singapore) Khairul Amri		(substituted on) 67'
Head coach:
(Germany) Jürgen Raab

Match officials

- Referee: Sukhbir Singh (SIN)
- Assistant referees:
  - Edwin Lee (SIN)
  - Victor Teo (SIN)
- Fourth official: Jansen Foo (SIN)
- Match commissioner: Hanizam Aris (SIN)

Match rules

- 90 minutes.
- Penalty shoot-out if scores level after 90 minutes.
- Maximum of seven-named substitutes.
- Maximum of three substitutions.

== See also ==
- 2017 S.League
- 2017 Singapore Cup
- 2017 Singapore League Cup
