= Yasutaka Yanagi =

Japanese footballer (born 1994)

Yasutaka Yanagi 柳 育崇
Personal information
- Full name: Yasutaka Yanagi
- Date of birth: 22 June 1994 (age 32)
- Place of birth: Chiba, Japan
- Height: 1.87 m (6 ft 2 in)
- Position: Defensive midfielder

Team information
- Current team: Tochigi SC
- Number: 5

Youth career
- Sawara Young Leaves
- Kashima Antlers
- 2010–2012: Yachiyo High School

College career
Years	Team	Apps	(Gls)
2013–2016	Senshu University		

Senior career*
Years	Team	Apps	(Gls)
2017	Albirex Niigata (S)	22	(2)
2018–2020	Albirex Niigata	4	(0)
2020	→ Tochigi SC (loan)	35	(6)
2021	Tochigi SC	42	(8)
2022–2025	Fagiano Okayama	116	(10)
2026–	Tochigi SC	18	(0)
- * Club domestic league appearances and goals as of 17 August 2026

Yasutaka Yanagi (柳 育崇, Yanagi Yasutaka; born June 22, 1994) is a Japanese footballer who plays as a centre-back for J3 League club Tochigi SC.

== Early career ==
He was educated at the Kashima Antlers Junior Youth team and played for Yachiyo High School and Senshu University before moving to Singapore in 2017.

== Club career ==
=== Albirex Niigata Singapore ===
Yanagi signed his first professional contract with Albirex Niigata Singapore, a satellite team of J.League side Albirex Niigata, who play in the S.League.

Yanagi's stellar performances for the White Swans earned him a spot in the Singapore Selection side that took on Selangor FA in the annual Sultan of Selangor's Cup.

During the September international break, he was selected to participate in a week-long training stint with his parent club. He traveled to Niigata prefecture with club captain Shuto Inaba and the duo trained with the first team, playing in a training match against Iwaki FC, a non-J League team.

He played a total of 22 league games for the White Swans and scored 2 goals as they claimed the quadruple for the second consecutive year. His importance for the team is highlighted in the fact that the White Swans’ only two losses came when he was not on the field.

=== Albirex Niigata ===
Following his stellar performances for the White Swans' satellite club, Yanagi joined the White Swans' parent club for the upcoming 2018 J2 League season.

=== Loan to Tochigi SC ===
In 2020, he was originally registered with Albirex Niigata. However, on 11 February 2020, he joined Tochigi SC with a one-year loan deal. On 16 December of the same year, he scored his sixth goal of the season against JEF United Chiba in Matchweek 41. This was the first J-League goal scored at Kanseki Stadium Tochigi, where the J.League official game was held for the first time on the same day. On 29 December 2020, Yanagi permanently transferred to Tochigi SC after his loan from Albirex Niigata expired.

=== Fagiano Okayama ===
On 6 January 2022, Yanagi joined J2 club Fagiano Okayama on a permanent transfer deal. On 7 December 2024, Yanagi helped secure his club promotion to the J1 League for the first time in their history, after defeating Vegalta Sendai 2–0 in the promotion play-off final. On 26 December 2024, the club extended his contract for the 2025 season.

=== Return to Tochigi SC ===
In December 2025, it was announced that Yanagi would be rejoining Tochigi SC after four seasons at Fagiano Okayama.

== Career statistics ==
=== Club ===
As of 31 March 2026.

Appearances and goals by club, season and competition
Club	Season	League			National cup (Note: Includes Singapore Cup and Emperors Cup)		League cup (Note: Includes Singapore League Cup and J.League Cup)		Other		Total	
Club	Season	Division	Apps	Goals	Apps	Goals	Apps	Goals	Apps	Goals	Apps	Goals
Albirex Niigata FC (S)	2017	S.League	22	2	5	0	5	0	–		32	2
Albirex Niigata	2018	J2 League	3	0	2	0	5	0	–		10	0
Albirex Niigata	2019	J2 League	1	0	1	0	0	0	–		2	0
Albirex Niigata	Total		4	0	3	0	5	0	0	0	12	0
Tochigi SC (loan)	2020	J2 League	35	6	0	0	–		–		35	6
Tochigi SC	2021	J2 League	42	8	2	0	–		–		44	8
Fagiano Okayama	2022	J2 League	38	4	0	0	0	0	1 (Note: Appearance in J1/J2 play-offs)	0	39	4
Fagiano Okayama	2023	J2 League	39	4	0	0	0	0	0	0	39	4
Fagiano Okayama	2024	J2 League	35	2	1	0	2	0	1	0	39	2
Fagiano Okayama	2025	J1 League	4	0	0	0	1	0	0	0	5	0
Fagiano Okayama	Total		116	10	1	0	3	0	2	0	122	10
Tochigi SC	2026	J2/J3 (100)	7	0	0	0	–		–		7	0
Career total			204	24	6	0	8	0	2	0	220	24

== Honours ==
=== Club ===
Albirex Niigata Singapore

- S.League: 2017
- Singapore Cup: 2017
- Singapore League Cup: 2017
- Singapore Community Shield: 2017

Fagiano Okayama

- J2 League Promotion Play-off winner: 2024
