= Kazuaki Yoshinaga =

Japanese football coach

Personal information
- Date of birth: March 17, 1968 (age 58)
- Place of birth: Fukuoka, Japan
- Height: 1.70 m (5 ft 7 in)

Managerial career
- Years: Team
- 2005–2007: Shimizu S-Pulse (assistant)
- 2007–2008: Sagan Tosu (assistant)
- 2008–2009: Sagan Tosu U18
- 2016: Ventforet Kofu
- 2017–2018: Albirex Niigata (S)
- 2019: Albirex Niigata (academy manager)
- 2019–2020: Albirex Niigata
- 2020–2021: Albirex Niigata (academy manager)
- 2021: Albirex Niigata (S) (technical director)
- 2022–2024: Albirex Niigata (S)

Kazuaki Yoshinaga (吉永一明, Yoshinaga Kazuaki, born 17 March 1968, in Fukuoka, Japan) is a Japanese coach.

== Coaching career ==
=== Shimizu S-Pulse ===
In 2005, Yoshinaga started his coaching career serving as an assistant to Kenta Hasegawa at J1 League club, Shimizu S-Pulse for 2 seasons which sees him served under his wing for 90 games.

=== Sagan Tosu ===
In 2007, Yoshinaga was made as the assistant coach under Yasuyuki Kishino for J2 League club, Sagan Tosu in which he helped the club to their highest league finished in their history. After 51 games serving as the assistant, Yoshinaga was rewarded to lead Sagan Tosu U18 team the following season.

=== High School coach ===
Yoshinaga was also the head coach of Yamanashi Gakuin Senior High School Soccer Club from 2010 to 2015.

=== Ventforet Kofu ===
After 8 years, Yoshinaga returned to professional coaching and was an assistant coach for the main team at J1 League club, Ventforet Kofu under manager, Satoru Sakuma in 2016.

=== Albirex Niigata Singapore ===
Yoshinaga was appointed head coach of Albirex Niigata Singapore in 2017. He won the S.League title in 2017, and also won S.League coach of the year. He extended his contract with the Swans for another year, and the next season saw Yoshinaga led Albirex to win all titles in Singapore professional football: 2018 Singapore Premier League, 2018 Singapore Cup and 2018 Singapore Community Shield, while he won the league's coach of the year for the second successive year.

=== Albirex Niigata ===
Yoshinaga impressive work with Albirex Niigata Singapore rewards him a returned to Japan in 2019 where the parent club, Albirex Niigata appointed him initially as their academy manager. On 14 April 2019, after first-team manager Koichiro Katafuchi resigns, Yoshinaga was appointed as his successor guiding them in the J2 League. Yoshinaga served as Albirex Niigata's manager till 31 January 2020, following which he took charge of the U18 side, before returning to his post of Academy Manager.

=== Returns to Singapore ===
In April 2021, Yoshinaga returned to Albirex Niigata Singapore as the Technical Director, before becoming the club Manager once again for the 2022 Singapore Premier League season. In his return in his first season, he steer the club to win the 2022 Singapore Premier League title. The following season, Yoshinaga helped the club to retain the league title and won a cup double of the 2023 Singapore Premier League title and the 2023 Singapore Community Shield. On 16 August 2023, in the final league game of the 2023 Singapore Premier League fixtures against Hougang United, Yoshinaga reach the milestone of his 100 league games in charge of Albirex Niigata Singapore.

After a string of disappointment results of five losing streaks, he left his post on 13 July 2024.

== Honours ==
=== Manager ===
Albirex Singapore (S)

- S.League: 2017
- Singapore Premier League: 2018, 2022, 2023
- Singapore Cup: 2017, 2018
- Singapore League Cup: 2017
- Singapore Community Shield: 2017, 2018, 2023

=== Individual ===
- Singapore Premier League Coach of the Year: 2017, 2018, 2022, 2023
