= FC Jurong =

Jurong
- Full name: Football Club Jurong
- Nickname: The Swans
- Short name: FCJ, JRG
- Founded: 2004; 22 years ago as Albirex Niigata Singapore; 2026; 0 years ago as FC Jurong
- Ground: Jurong East Stadium
- Capacity: 2,700
- Owner(s): NSG Global Pte Ltd; SKASports Investments
- Chairman: Daisuke Korenaga
- Head coach: Jaswinder Singh
- League: Singapore Premier League
- 2025–26: Singapore Premier League, 3rd of 8
- Website: www.fcjurong.com
Home colours	Away colours

Football Club Jurong, formerly known as Albirex Niigata Singapore, is a professional football club based in Jurong East, Singapore, which plays in the Singapore Premier League. The club has won 6 league titles (including one unbeaten), 4 Singapore Cups, 4 Singapore League Cups and 4 Community Shields.

== History ==
=== Beginning (2004–2010) ===
FC Jurong was originally established as Albirex Niigata Singapore or commonly known as Albirex Niigata (S), a satellite team of Japanese club Albirex Niigata. The club then joined the S. League in 2004. It was in that year the Football Association of Singapore decided to invite foreign teams in the league in a bid to deal with poor attendance issues. For the first years of the club's participation in the league it has settled in the mid-table in the standings. In 2008, Daisuke Korenaga became chairman of the club. He secured sponsorship from Japanese companies with presence in Singapore, with the club having as many as 50 sponsors and improved fan engagement by setting up an academy.

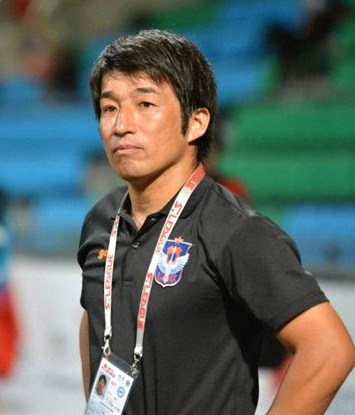
Koichi Sugiyama as Albirex Niigata Singapore head coach from 2010 to 2013

=== First silverware in club history (2011–2013) ===
2011 was a great start for Albirex Niigata (S) as midway throughout 2011, head coach, Koichi Sugiyama leads them to all the way to final of the 2011 Singapore League Cup and guiding the White Swans to their first ever piece of silverware in the club history. Sugiyama also guided them to the 2011 Singapore Cup but eventually conceded a goal in the very last minute of extra time against Home United. In August 2014, he left Albirex to signed with Thailand club, Ayutthaya.

=== Cup's double and clean sweep (2014–2016) ===
Tatsuyuki Okuyama who once coached youth teams of Albirex after his playing career, and also the Albirex Niigata Ladies, was signed as the head coach for Albirex Niigata (S). Okuyama was Sugiyama's assistant coach during the 2013 season, which saw Okuyama succeeding him in being the head coach for the White Swans for the upcoming 2014 season. The following season, he guided the team to win the 2015 Singapore League Cup and the 2015 Singapore Cup. After 6 years since his first charge of the club, Naoki Naruo re-joined Albirex Niigata (S), replacing Tatsuyuki Okuyama as head coach. Naruo led the White Swans to win all four major trophies, the 2016 S.League, 2016 Singapore Cup, 2016 Singapore League Cup and the 2016 Singapore Community Shield, which led to him being named the 2016 S.League Coach of the Year. On 3 November 2016, two days after winning the league championship, Naruo announced that he is leaving the newly crowned champions.

=== Invincible season by Kazuaki Yoshinaga (2017) ===
On 2 December 2016, Kazuaki Yoshinaga was appointed head coach. In his first year, Yoshinaga guided them to retained the 2017 S.League title and also and also winning the 2017 S.League Coach of the Year. He extended his contract with the White Swans for another year, coaching them for the revamped 2018 Singapore Premier League (SPL) season, winning the league title without defeat and also all of the possible titles in Singapore professional football: 2018 Singapore Cup and 2018 Singapore Community Shield, while he also won the league's 2018 Coach of the Year award for the second successive year. Due to Yoshinaga's impressive work with Albirex Niigata (S), he returned to Japan in 2019 as the parent club appointed him initially as their academy manager.

=== Consecutive champions (2021–2023) ===
In April 2021, Kazuaki Yoshinaga returned to Albirex Niigata (S) as the club technical director, before guiding them to win the 2022 Singapore Premier League title and also winning the league's 2022 Coach of the Year award for the third time. On 28 December 2021, Albirex Niigata (S) announced the signing of former Southampton forward and Japanese legend Tadanari Lee. Lee had also won the 2017 AFC Champions League with Urawa Red Diamonds and the J1 League title with Yokohama F. Marinos in 2019. It was reported that the one-year contract will see him earn about $12,000 per month. On 1 December 2022, Yoshinaga extended his contract for the 2023 season. The following season, he help them to win the title and the 2023 Singapore Community Shield.

=== Localisation and decline (2024–2025) ===
To commemorate the 20th anniversary of the club, on 13 September 2023, Albirex Niigata (S) announced that from the 2024 season, the club shifts its focus towards Singaporean players. The club also announced a local brand, Fifty50 as their apparel partnership for the season. Albirex Niigata Singapore announced in December 2023 that they have signed veteran Yohei Otake from J2 League side V-Varen Nagasaki, Yojiro Takahagi from FC Tokyo and Stevia Egbus Mikuni for their 2024 campaign. Albirex Niigata Singapore also signed U-21 Japanese-Iraqi footballer Arya Igami Tarhani and Shuhei Hoshino who returned to the club after six years. The club suffered their heaviest defeat since 2009 in a 7–1 lost to league rivals Lion City Sailors on 23 June 2024. They went on to suffered another back-to-back thrashing loss to Geylang International 6–0 on 6 July 2024. After a string of disappointment results of five losing streaks, head coach Kazuaki Yoshinaga left the club on 13 July 2024. His assistant Keiji Shigetomi took over as interim head coach.

Ahead of the 2025–26 season, Albirex Niigata (S) announced Keiji Shigetomi has signed a permanent contract to stay as the club head coach. The club also announced Spanish sportswear company Kelme as the club apparel partnership for the new season. In June 2025, Albirex Niigata (S) also announced signing Korean player Lee Dong Yeol on loan from FC Osaka. The club also went on to sign two more Korean players; Kim Tae-uk and Cho Eun-su.

=== Club revamp (2026–present) ===
On 27 November 2025, Albirex Niigata (S) announced that the club will be changing its name and crest to Albirex Jurong Football Club, from the 2026–27 season onwards. While the women's and youth team adopt the name on 1 January, the men's team planned the change on 1 July 2026. The plan was then revised in April, with the club name decided to be known as FC Jurong instead. The club also signed Japanese player Keisuke Honda for the 2026–27 season.

On 15 May 2026, FC Jurong announced strategic partnership with SKASports Investments, an India-based company engaged in sports-related businesses and investments in sports assets. The club aims to expand on their community connection with SKASports as a minority shareholder. SKASports director Sudhir Menon hopes to expand the brand awareness to the Indian community, both in India and in Singapore. As part of this partnership, SKASports Investments acquired a minority stake in NSG Global Pte Ltd, the parent and operating company of the club. On 16 October 2026, Hazeem Bakre joined FC Jurong, becoming the club's first British player and marking a departure from its traditional recruitment links with Japanese players and the wider Asian region. His arrival represented a notable development in the club's recruitment strategy.

== Team image ==
=== Ownership ===
NSG Global Pte Ltd is the majority stakeholder where the company oversees the club's football and business operations and is responsible for the overall management of the organisation. In 2024, the club transitioned to a local outfit which club chairman, Daisuke Korenaga has been involved in the club's transition towards a more locally rooted identity, with the club name intended to reflect its geographical base and stronger connection with the western region of Singapore.

The club's change of identity followed its transition from being the Singapore satellite club of Japanese side Albirex Niigata to operating as a local Singaporean club. allowing it to operate under the same competition regulations as other local teams, including the Singapore Premier League's foreign-player regulations. The subsequent adoption of the FC Jurong name in 2026 formed part of the club's longer-term strategy to become more deeply established within the local community.

==== Minority stake holder ====
In May 2026, Indian sports investment company '''SKASports Investments Private Limited''' acquired a minority stake in NSG Global. The investment was aimed at supporting FC Jurong's commercial development, youth development and international partnerships.

== Affiliated clubs ==
The following clubs are/were affiliated with FC Jurong.

- (Singapore) Albirex Jurong Women's
- (Japan) Albirex Niigata
- Japan Soccer College
- (Spain) Albirex Niigata Barcelona
- (Cambodia) Albirex Niigata Phnom Penh
- (Portugal) Os Belenenses
- (Belgium) Deinze

== Kit suppliers and shirt sponsors ==
Period	Kit supplier	Main sponsors
2004	(Germany) Adidas	(Japan) Teraoka
2005–2009	(Germany) Adidas	(Japan) Sanyo
2010–2012	(Germany) Adidas	(Japan) Sanyo
2013	Gol.Japan	(Japan) Sanyo
2014–2016	(Singapore) Mafro Sports	(Japan) Sanyo
2016–2018	(Denmark) Hummel	(Japan) Sanyo
2019–2021	(Japan) Mizuno	(Japan) Sanyo
2021–2023	(Japan) Mizuno	(Japan) Denka
2024–2025	(Singapore) Fifty50	(Japan) Denka
2025–2026	(Spain) Kelme	(Japan) Denka
2026–present	(Japan) CORAZÓN	Takasago Singapore

== Stadium ==
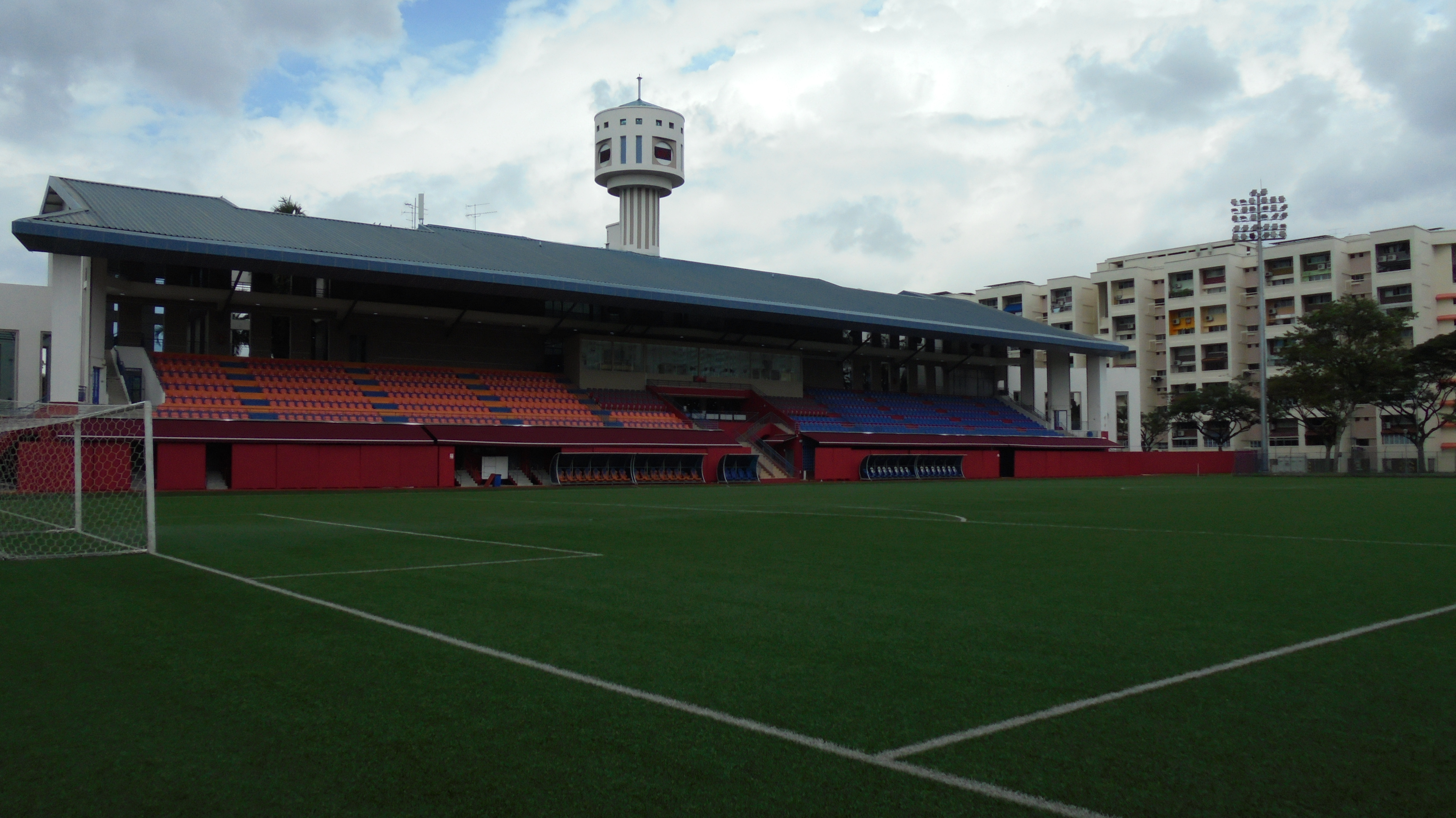
Home of the Swans since their inception in 2004

The Swan's home ground is the 2,700 capacity Jurong East Stadium, located in the West side of Singapore. It is used both for football matches and community events.

== Players ==
=== First-team squad ===
As of August 2026

Note: Flags indicate national team as defined under FIFA eligibility rules; some limited exceptions apply. Players may hold more than one non-FIFA nationality.

No.	Pos.	Nation	Player
1	GK	KOR	Lee Jin-woo
2	DF	KOR	Kim Yoon-sik
3	DF	JPN	Shunsuke Ono
4	MF	JPN	Keisuke Honda
5	DF	KOR	Seo Seung-woo
6	MF	JPN	Yuma Tsuzurabara
7	MF	JPN	Seiya Satsukida
8	MF	JPN	Kodai Dohi
9	FW	JPN	Mizuki Ando
10	MF	JPN	Takuma Yamaguchi
11	FW	JPN	Toa Suenaga
14	FW	SGP	Jaden Heng ^{U21}
15	MF	SGP	Syed Firdaus Hassan
16	FW	SGP	Liska Iskandar ^{U21}
17	FW	SGP	Helmi Shahrol ^{U21}

No.	Pos.	Nation	Player
18	GK	SGP	Hassan Sunny (captain)
19	DF	SGP	Akram Azman
20	DF	SGP	Sim Jun Yen ^{U21}
21	MF	SGP	Rauf Anaqi ^{U21}
22	FW	SGP	Nicky Melvin Singh
23	DF	SGP	Delwinder Singh
24	DF	SGP	Andrew Aw
25	GK	SGP	Firman Nabil
28	MF	SGP	Aloysius Pang ^{U23}
30	MF	SGP	Shakthi Vinayagavijayan ^{U23}
32	MF	SGP	Christopher van Huizen
35	DF	SGP	Sachin Kabilan ^{U21}
38	DF	SGP	Izz Anaqi ^{U21}
42	MF	SGP	Haziq Kamarudin
44	FW	ENG	Hazeem Bakre
45	DF	KOR	Lee Jae-yong

=== SPL2 squad ===
Note: Flags indicate national team as defined under FIFA eligibility rules; some limited exceptions apply. Players may hold more than one non-FIFA nationality.

No.	Pos.	Nation	Player
26	DF	SGP	Aneeq Fairus ^{U21}
27	DF	SGP	Ahmad Martin ^{U21}
33	DF	SGP	Aqil Zafri ^{U21}
34	DF	SGP	Arsyad Arzain ^{U21}
37	FW	SGP	Chen Yang Yi ^{U19}
39	DF	SGP	Tyler Matthew ^{U21}
41	GK	SGP	Iskandar Abdul Latiff ^{U19}
61	GK	USA	Kaidan Ferrell ^{U21}
62	DF	ENG	Tom Bradley ^{U19}
63	DF	SGP	Evan Teo ^{U19}
64	DF	SGP	Wirth Kaylan ^{U19}
65	MF	SGP	Derek Man Ruiqi ^{U21}
66	FW	SGP	Danish Haikal ^{U21}
67	DF	SGP	Derric Luke Kumar ^{U19}
69	DF	SGP	Yap Ho Wai ^{U19}

No.	Pos.	Nation	Player
70	DF	SGP	Sachin Sajeev ^{U19}
71	GK	SGP	Noor Aydrin^{U19}
72	DF	SGP	Rowan Shah ^{U19}
73	MF	SGP	Lucas Lee ^{U21}
74	FW	SGP	Omar Asad Barnwell ^{U21}
75	MF	POR	Santiago Rodrigues ^{FP U21}
76	FW	ESP	Carlos David Rocha ^{FP U21}
77	FW	SGP	Aidil Abdullah ^{U21}
78	FW	USA	Aidan Pottschul ^{FP U21}
79	DF	PHI	Xantos Jacobus ^{U19}
80	MF	SGP	Zakaria Saadullah ^{U21}
81	GK	SGP	Aqeel Salleh ^{U19}
82	FW	JPN	Ryunosuke Alex Iwanaga ^{FP U21}
83	FW	SGP	Lutfyl Hady ^{U21}
84	MF	SGP	Shaun Shaik ^{U21}

=== On loan ===
Note: Flags indicate national team as defined under FIFA eligibility rules; some limited exceptions apply. Players may hold more than one non-FIFA nationality.

No.	Pos.	Nation	Player
32	DF	SGP	Syafi'ie Redzuan
52	DF	SGP	Junki Kenn Yoshimura (July 2027)
53	MF	SGP	Jarrel Ong
54	DF	SGP	Kenji Austin (March 2027)
67	FW	SGP	Darwisy Hanis

== Management and staff ==
Management
Position	Name
Chairman	(Japan) Daisuke Korenaga
Team manager	(Singapore) Hafizuddin Hanuar

Technical staff
Position	Name
Technical director	(Japan) Keiji Shigetomi
Head coach	(Singapore) Jaswinder Singh
Assistant coach	(Japan) Hiroaki Nagamine
Assistant coach	(Japan) Nozomi Ikarashi
Assistant coach	(Japan) Yahiro Saito
Assistant coach	(Singapore) Nas Nastin
Goalkeeper coach	(Singapore) Fadhil Salim
Strength & Conditioning coach	(Singapore) Mark Anthony
Physiotherapist	(Singapore) Kyler Wong
Kitman	(Singapore) Roy Krishnan
Kitman	(Malaysia) Herman Pelani

== Honours ==
Type	Competition	Titles	Seasons
League	Singapore Premier League	6	2016, 2017, 2018, 2020, 2022, 2023
Cup	Singapore Cup	4	2015, 2016, 2017, 2018
Cup	Singapore Community Shield	4	2016, 2017, 2018, 2023
Others	Singapore League Cup	4	2011, 2015, 2016, 2017

Bold is for those competition that are currently active.

=== Notable seasons ===
- Double: 2015, 2023
- Treble: 2016, 2018
- Quadruple: 2017

== Award winners ==
=== Domestic ===
- League player of the year
  - (Japan) Fumiya Kogure (2015)
  - (Japan) Atsushi Kawata (2016)
  - (Japan) Kento Nagasaki (2017)
  - (Japan) Wataru Murofushi (2018)
  - (Japan) Kodai Tanaka (2022)
- League young player of the year
  - (Canada) Issey Nakajima-Farran (2005)
  - (Japan) Tatsuro Inui (2011)
  - (Singapore) Adam Swandi (2018)
  - (Singapore) Ilhan Fandi (2022)
  - (Japan) Seia Kunori (2023)
- League coach of the year
  - (Japan) Koichi Sugiyama (2011)
  - (Japan) Naoki Naruo (2016)
  - (Japan) Kazuaki Yoshinaga (2017, 2018, 2022, 2023)
- League top scorer
  - (Japan) Tsubasa Sano (2017)
  - (Japan) Shuhei Hoshino (2018)
- League Goal of the Year
  - (Japan) Shotaro Ihata against Balestier Khalsa on 20 March 2015
  - (Japan) Tomoki Menda against Young Lions on 11 August 2016
  - (Singapore) Ilhan Fandi against Balestier Khalsa on 16 July 2022
- League golden gloves
  - (Japan) Takuma Ito (2012)
  - (Japan) Yōsuke Nozawa (2015, 2016, 2017, 2018)
  - (Japan) Kei Okawa (2020)
  - (Japan) Takahiro Koga (2021)
- League team of the year
  - (Japan) Yōsuke Nozawa (2017, 2018)
  - (Japan) Yasutaka Yanagi (2017)
  - (Japan) Naofumi Tanaka (2017)
  - (Japan) Shuto Inaba (2017)
  - (Japan) Kento Nagasaki (2017)
  - (Japan) Tsubasa Sano (2017)
  - (Japan) Riku Moriyasu (2018)
  - (Japan) Shuhei Sasahara (2018)
  - (Japan) Kenya Takahashi (2018)
  - (Japan) Wataru Murofushi (2018)
  - (Japan) Shuhei Hoshino (2018)
  - (Japan) Kaishu Yamazaki (2019)
  - (Singapore) Kyoga Nakamura (2019)
  - (Japan) Kazuki Hashioka (2020, 2021)
  - (Japan) Takahiro Koga (2021)
  - (Japan) Shuya Yamashita (2021)
  - (Japan) Ryoya Tanigushi (2021)
  - (Japan) Masaya Idetsu (2022)
  - (Japan) Kodai Tanaka (2022)
  - (Singapore) Ilhan Fandi (2022)
  - (Japan) Koki Kawachi (2023)
  - (Japan) Asahi Yokokawa (2023)
  - (Japan) Seia Kunori (2023)

== Records and statistics ==
As of 20 September 2026

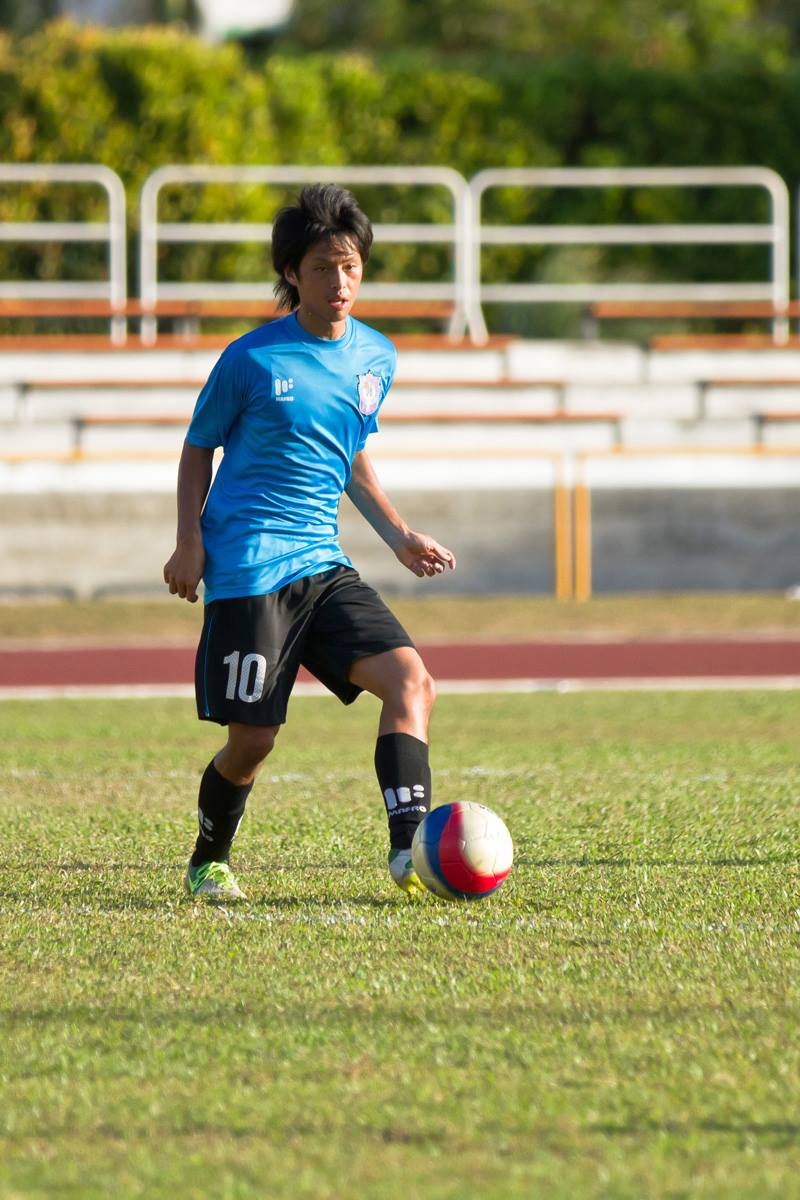
Kento Nagasaki was the club highest appearance player from 2013 to 2017.

=== Top 10 all-time appearances ===
Rank	Player	Years	Club appearances
1	(Japan) Kento Nagasaki	2013–2017	164
2	(Japan) Hiroyoshi Kamata	2016–2020	138
3	(Japan) Atsushi Shimono	2009–2012	129
4	(Japan) Yōsuke Nozawa	2015–2018	125
5	(Japan) Shuhei Hotta	2011–2014	106
6	(Japan) Tatsuro Inui	2010–2011 2016	103
7	(Japan) Itsuki Yamada	2013–2015	100
8	(Japan) Kento Fujihara	2014–2016	98
9	(Japan) Yoshito Matsushita	2008–2011	97
10	(Japan) Rui Kumada	2015–2017	91

=== Top 10 all-time scorers ===
Rank	Player	Club appearances	Total goals
1	(Japan) Shingo Nakano	58	51
2	(Japan) Kento Nagasaki	164	41
3	(Japan) Kazuki Sakamoto	65	40
4	(Japan) Kodai Tanaka	32	39
5	(Japan) Tatsuro Inui	103	32
6	(Japan) Atsushi Kawata	60	31
6	(Japan) Tsubasa Sano	29	31
8	(Japan) Shotaro Ihata	67	27
9	(Japan) Shuhei Hoshino	56	26
10	(Japan) Bruno Suzuki	90	25

== Notable players ==
This section contains a list of former players who have either played 100 league games for the club, gone on to represent their nation, or played the J.League.

- (Canada) Issey Nakajima-Farran (2004–2006)
- (India) Arata Izumi (2005)
- (Chinese Taipei) Yoshitaka Komori (2009)
- (Japan) Akira Takase (2007–2009)
- (Japan) Taisuke Akiyoshi (2008–2009)
- (Japan) Ryota Kobayashi (2008–2009)
- (Japan) Takasuke Goto (2009)
- (Japan) Shota Matsuoka (2009–2010)
- (Japan) Atsushi Shimono (2009–2012)
- (Japan) Bruno Suzuki (2010–2011)
- (Japan) Shuhei Hotta (2011–2014)
- (Japan) Toshikazu Soya (2012)
- (Japan) Masahiro Ishikawa (2013)
- (Japan) Kento Nagasaki (2013–2017)
- (Cambodia) Hikaru Mizuno (2015)
- (Japan) Atsushi Kawata (2015–2016)
- (Japan) Yōsuke Nozawa (2015–2018)
- (Japan) Shunkun Tani (2016)
- (Japan) Shuto Inaba (2016–2017)
- (Japan) Hiroyoshi Kamata (2016–2020)
- (Japan) Takuya Akiyama (2017)
- (Japan) Tsubasa Sano (2017)
- (Japan) Yasutaka Yanagi (2017)
- (Japan) Wataru Murofushi (2018)
- (Japan) Kenta Kurishima (2020)
- (Japan) Kosuke Chiku (2021)
- (Japan) Takahiro Koga (2021–2022)
- (Japan) Daichi Omori (2022)
- (Singapore) Ilhan Fandi (2022)
- (Japan) Kodai Tanaka (2022)
- (Japan) Tadanari Lee (2022–2023)
- (Japan) Asahi Yokokawa (2023)
- (Japan) Stevia Egbus Mikuni (2024–2025)
- (Japan) Yohei Otake (2024–2025)
- (Japan) Yojiro Takahagi (2024–2025)
- (Japan) Shingo Nakano (2024–2026)
- (North Korea) Ryang Hyon-ju (2025–2026)
- (Japan) Keisuke Honda (2026–)
- (Japan) Kodai Dohi (2026–)
- (Japan) Mizuki Ando (2026–)

=== Notable managers ===
- (Japan) Ichiro Otsuka
- (Japan) Hiroaki Hiraoka
- (Japan) Koichi Sugiyama
- (Japan) Kazuaki Yoshinaga

=== Internationally capped players ===
AFC/OFC: (Cambodia) Hikaru Mizuno; (Chinese Taipei) Yoshitaka Komori; (India) Arata Izumi; (Japan) Asahi Yokokawa; (Japan) Keisuke Honda; (Japan) Kuraba Kondo; (Japan) Ryosuke Nagasawa; (Japan) Stevia Egbus Mikuni; (Japan) Tadanari Lee; (Japan) Yojiro Takahagi; (North Korea) Ryang Hyon-ju	CAF – NIL –	UEFA – NIL –	CONMEBOL/ CONCACAF: (Canada) Issey Nakajima-Farran

== Managerial history ==
Manager/coach	Career	Pld	W	D	L	Achievements
As Albirex Niigata (S)
(Japan) Hiroshi Ohashi	2004	27	12	8	7	
(Japan) Ichiro Otsuka	2005–2006	54	24	17	16	
(Japan) Hiroaki Hiraoka	2007–2008	71	20	19	32	
(Japan) Naoki Naruo	2009	37	13	6	18	
(Japan) Koichi Sugiyama	2010–2013	140	63	39	40	– 2011 Singapore League Cup
(Japan) Tatsuyuki Okuyama	2014–2015	70	38	11	21	– 2015 Singapore Cup – 2015 Singapore League Cup
(Japan) Naoki Naruo (2)	2016	34	25	3	7	– 2016 S.League – 2016 Singapore Cup – 2016 Singapore League Cup – 2016 Singapore Community Shield
(Japan) Kazuaki Yoshinaga	2017–2018	65	56	7	2	– 2017 S.League – 2018 Singapore Premier League – 2017, 2018 Singapore Cup – 2017 Singapore League Cup – 2017, 2018 Singapore Community Shield
(Japan) Keiji Shigetomi	11 December 2018–December 2021	63	36	15	12	
(Japan) Kazuaki Yoshinaga (2)	January 2022–13 July 2024	35	21	9	5	– 2022, 2023 Singapore Premier League – 2023 Singapore Community Shield
(Japan) Keiji Shigetomi (2)	13 July 2024–2 June 2026					
As FC Jurong
(Singapore) Jaswinder Singh	2 June 2026–present					
