= Yoshito Matsushita =

Japanese footballer

Personal information
- Full name: Yoshito Matsushita
- Date of birth: October 29, 1989 (age 37)
- Place of birth: Wakayama, Japan
- Height: 1.82 m (5 ft 11 1/2 in)
- Position: Goalkeeper

Youth career
- 2005–2007: Albirex Niigata

Senior career*
Years	Team	Apps	(Gls)
2008–2011	Albirex Niigata Singapore	83	(0)
2012	Arterivo Wakayama	0	(0)
2012–2014	Grulla Morioka	8	(0)
2015	ReinMeer Aomori	0	(0)
Total		8	(0)
- * Club domestic league appearances and goals

Yoshito Matsushita (松下 泰士, Matsushita Yoshito; born October 29, 1989) is a former Japanese football player.

== Playing career ==
Yoshito Matsushita played for Albirex Niigata Singapore, Arterivo Wakayama, Grulla Morioka, ReinMeer Aomori from 2008 to 2015.
