= Toshikazu Soya =

Japanese footballer

Personal information
- Full name: Toshikazu Soya
- Date of birth: October 21, 1989 (age 37)
- Place of birth: Tokyo, Japan
- Height: 1.80 m (5 ft 11 in)
- Position: Forward

Team information
- Current team: MIO Biwako Shiga
- Number: 33

Youth career
- 2005–2007: Tokyo Verdy Youth
- 2008–2011: Ryutsu Keizai University

Senior career*
Years	Team	Apps	(Gls)
2012	Albirex Niigata Singapore	16	(5)
2012–2015	Grulla Morioka	54	(19)
2016	Saurcos Fukui	9	(2)
2017–	MIO Biwako Shiga		
- * Club domestic league appearances and goals as of 20 February 2017

Toshikazu Soya (征矢 智和, Soya Toshikazu; born October 21, 1989) is a Japanese football player. He plays for MIO Biwako Shiga.

== Playing career ==
Toshikazu Soya joined to Albirex Niigata Singapore in 2012. In September, he moved to Grulla Morioka and played to 2015. In 2016, he moved to Saurcos Fukui, then he changed to MIO Biwako Shiga for 2017 season.

== Club statistics ==
Updated to 20 February 2017.

Club performance			League		Cup		Total	
Season	Club	League	Apps	Goals	Apps	Goals	Apps	Goals
Japan			League		Emperor's Cup		Total	
2012	Grulla Morioka	JRL (Tohoku)	3	2	0	0	3	2
2013	Grulla Morioka	JRL (Tohoku)	18	13	1	0	19	13
2014	Grulla Morioka	J3 League	24	3	0	0	24	3
2015	Grulla Morioka	J3 League	9	1	0	0	9	1
2016	Saurcos Fukui	JRL (Hokushinetsu)	9	2	1	0	10	2
Total			63	21	2	0	65	21
