= Hiroyoshi Kamata =

Japanese footballer

Personal information
- Date of birth: April 4, 1997 (age 29)
- Place of birth: Kanagawa, Japan
- Height: 1.65 m (5 ft 5 in)
- Position: Striker

Team information
- Current team: Auckland United
- Number: 19

Youth career
- Albirex Niigata U18

Senior career*
Years	Team	Apps	(Gls)
2016–2020	Albirex Niigata (S)	112	(21)
2021	Fukui United	5	(0)
2022–	Auckland United	22	(3)
- * Club domestic league appearances and goals as of 23:01, 28 August 2024 (UTC)

Hiroyoshi Kamata (鎌田 啓義, Kamata Hiroyoshi; born April 4, 1997) is a Japanese footballer who is forward currently playing for Auckland United in the New Zealand National League Northern League.

He was educated at and played for Albirex Niigata U18 before moving to Singapore.

== Club career ==
=== Albirex Niigata Singapore ===
Kamata signed for Albirex Niigata Singapore, the satellite team of Albirex Niigata ahead of the 2016 S.League season and also played for the under-15 and under-17 Japanese national teams. He scored on his league debut against DPMM on 13 February 2016, scoring in the 36th minute. On 9 January 2018, he was registered as an overage player due to new rule regulations. In 2018, he embarked on a week-long trial with their parent club in Japan. He renewed his contract with the White Swans for the 2019 season.

=== Fukui United ===
After 5 years in Singapore, Kamata returns to Japan to join Fukui United on 15 February 2021 which is playing in the Hokushinetsu Football League. After the end of the season, he was released from the club.

=== Auckland United ===
On 22 June 2022, Kamata signed with New Zealand club, Auckland United ahead of the 2022 season. He scored on his league debut against Waiheke United on 6 August 2022, scoring in the 46th minute. He renewed his contract for two-years after the end of the 2022 season.

== Club career statistics ==
As of 3 Sept 2022

Club performance			League		Cup		League Cup		Total	
Season	Club	League	Apps	Goals	Apps	Goals	Apps	Goals	Apps	Goals
Singapore			League		Singapore Cup		League Cup		Total	
2016	Albirex Niigata (S)	S.League	23	3	5	0	5	1	33	4
2017	Albirex Niigata (S)	S.League	24	4	5	1	5	0	34	5
2018	Albirex Niigata (S)	S.League	24	5	5	1	0	0	29	6
2019	Albirex Niigata (S)	Singapore Premier League	24	7	3	0	0	0	27	7
2020	Albirex Niigata (S)	Singapore Premier League	14	2	0	0	0	0	14	2
Total
Total	Singapore		112	21	18	2	10	1	137	24
Japan			League		Emperor Cup		J.League Cup		Total	
2021	Fukui United	Hokushinetsu Football League	5	0	0	0	1	0	6	0
Total
Total	Japan		5	0	0	0	1	0	6	0
New Zealand			Northern League		FA Cup		National League		Total	
2022	Auckland United	New Zealand National League; Northern League	5	1	0	0	3	2	8	3
2023	Auckland United	New Zealand National League; Northern League	1	0	0	0	2	0	3	0
2024	Auckland United	New Zealand National League; Northern League	0	0	1	0	12	0	13	0
Total
Total	New Zealand		6	1	1	0	17	2	24	3
Career total			122	21	19	2	22	1	161	24

== Honours ==
=== Club ===
Albirex Niigata Singapore

- Singapore Premier League: 2016, 2017, 2018, 2020
- Singapore Cup: 2016, 2017, 2018
- Singapore League Cup: 2016, 2017
- Singapore Community Shield: 2016, 2017, 2018

Fukui United

- Hokushinetsu Football League: 2021
