= Fifty50 =

East German rock band

Fifty50 is an East German punk rock band. Fifty50 was founded in Leipzig, Germany, in 1998.

== History ==
Fifty50 was formed in Leipzig, Germany.

Fifty50 played their first show in early 1999. They won the audience award at the "Band of the Year" competition in Leipzig in January 2000. After a few unsuccessful attempts, the band recorded and released their self-titled album in 2001. Fifty50 has continued to appear primarily in the east German territory and has appeared on stage at some large festivals (With Full Force, Force Attack).

In 2004, Fifty50 was invited to go on tour with ((tam)) on their final tour. In 2005, Fifty50 recorded their second album entitled 2. In June 2005 they played a 2-week tour through Texas, Louisiana, and Mississippi; and in February 2006, they played some venues in the UK.

Since 2008, Fifty50 have been on hiatus and the work on their 3rd album is yet unfinished.

Guitarist Holger joined "sicksinus" from 2007 until 2014, whereas Tilo (guitar) and Marcus (switched from drums to bass and vocals) are still active with "Dr.Tentorkel".

== Band members ==
- Säsh - Vocals, acoustic guitar
- Holger - Guitar
- Tilo - Guitar
- Benne - Bass (replaced Eddie in 1998)
- Marcus - Drums

== Discography ==
=== Studio albums ===
- 2001: 1
- 2005: 2

=== Compilations ===
- 2001: More than soccer (fund-raiser for alternative soccer team Roter Stern Leipzig)
- 2006: Roter Stern Leipzig compilation
- 2007: Zombiekiller Split #1 (appearing with 3 German songs)

=== Videos ===
- 2005: music video my decision
