= Lee Jin-woo =

- Hangul: 이진우
- RR: I Jinu
- MR: I Chinu

Lee Jin-woo (Korean: 이진우) may refer to:

- Lee Jin-woo (actor) (born 1969), South Korean actor
- Lee Jin-woo (boccia) (born c. 1972), South Korean boccia player
- Lee Jin-woo (footballer) (born 1982), South Korean footballer
- Lee Jin-woo (general) (born 1970), South Korean lieutenant general
- Lee Jin-woo (speed skater) (born 1986), South Korean speed skater
- Lee Jin-woo (singer) (born 2004), South Korean singer and actor
