= 2017 Singapore League Cup =

Tournament details
- Country: Singapore
- Dates: 7–21 July 2017
- Teams: 8

Final positions
- Champions: (Japan) Albirex Niigata (S)
- Runners-up: Warriors FC

Tournament statistics
- Matches played: 15
- Goals scored: 52 (3.47 per match)
- Top goal scorer(s): Tsubasa Sano; Andrei Ciolacu; Shahril Ishak (4 goals)
- All statistics correct as of 21 July 2017.

The 2017 Singapore League Cup (known as The New Paper League Cup for sponsorship reasons) is the 11th edition of the Singapore League Cup, Singapore's premier club football tournament organised by the Football Association of Singapore. Albirex Niigata (S) are the defending champions, having won their third trophy the previous year. The tournament was held from 7 to 21 July 2017.

== Teams ==
A total of 8 teams participate in the 2017 Singapore League Cup with all clubs coming from the S.League. Young Lions will not be participating in this edition of the Singapore League Cup.

- (Japan) Albirex Niigata (S)
- Balestier Khalsa
- (Brunei) DPMM FC
- Geylang International
- Home United
- Hougang United
- Tampines Rovers
- Warriors FC

== Group stage ==
=== Group A ===
Pos	Team	Pld	W	D	L	GF	GA	GD	Pts	Qualification
1	Albirex Niigata (S)	3	2	1	0	0	0	0	7	Advance to semi-final
2	Warriors	3	1	1	1	6	7	−1	4	Advance to semi-final
3	Hougang United	3	0	3	0	3	3	0	3	
4	Home United	3	0	1	2	4	6	−2	1	

Source: S.League
7 July 2017
19:30 UTC+8

Warriors FC	4 – 3	Home United
Ciolacu 22' (pen.) 64' 68'; Webb 76'		Plazibat 6'; Rifqi 15'; Harun 34' (pen.)

Choa Chu Kang Stadium, Singapore
Referee: Muhd Taqi
7 July 2017
19:30 UTC+8

Hougang United	0 – 0	(Japan) Albirex Niigata (S)

Hougang Stadium, Singapore
Referee: W Ravisanthiran

10 July 2017
19:30 UTC+8

Albirex Niigata (S) (Japan)	2 – 0	Warriors FC
Sakamoto 3'; Nagasaki 41'

Jurong East Stadium, Singapore
Referee: Sukhbir Singh
10 July 2017
19:30 UTC+8

Home United	1 – 1	Hougang United
Plazibat 30'		Fairoz 36'

Jalan Besar Stadium, Singapore
Referee: Farhad Mohd

13 July 2017
19:30 UTC+8

Home United	0 – 1	(Japan) Albirex Niigata (S)
		Sano 53'

Jalan Besar Stadium, Singapore
Referee: G Letchman
13 July 2017
19:30 UTC+8

Hougang United	2 – 2	Warriors FC
Fareez 35'; Pablo 57'		Shahril 4'; Ho 41'

Hougang Stadium, Singapore
Referee: Muhd Syahir

=== Group B ===
Pos	Team	Pld	W	D	L	GF	GA	GD	Pts	Qualification
1	(Brunei) DPMM FC	3	2	1	0	11	4	+7	7	Advance to semi-final
2	Geylang International	3	2	1	0	9	4	+5	7	Advance to semi-final
3	Balestier Khalsa	3	1	0	2	3	5	−2	3	
4	Tampines Rovers	3	0	0	3	2	12	−10	0	

Source: S.League
8 July 2017
19:30 UTC+8

Tampines Rovers	1 – 5	(Brunei) DPMM FC
Jamil 67'		Adi 14'; Hafiz 31' (o.g.); Maududi 41'; Azwan 41'; Shahrazen 48'

Jalan Besar Stadium, Singapore
Referee: Jansen Foo
8 July 2017
19:30 UTC+8

Balestier Khalsa	0 – 2	Geylang International
		Recha 31'; Sendra 50'

Toa Payoh Stadium, Singapore
Referee: Muhd Syahir

11 July 2017
19:30 UTC+8

Tampines Rovers	1 – 4	Geylang International
Ayob 63'		Ifwat 53' 64' 85'; Amy 69'

Jurong West Stadium, Singapore
Referee: Ahmad A'Qashah
11 July 2017
19:30 UTC+8

DPMM FC (Brunei)	3 – 0	Balestier Khalsa
Azwan A 7'; A.Syafeeq 42' (o.g.); Adi 70'

Jalan Besar Stadium, Singapore
Referee: G Letchman

14 July 2017
19:30 UTC+8

DPMM FC (Brunei)	3 – 3	Geylang International
Adi 20'; Maududi 69'; Helmi 84'		Coto 23'; Ricardo 48'; Taufiq 68' (pen.)

Jalan Besar Stadium, Singapore
Referee: Farhad Mohd
14 July 2017
19:30 UTC+8

Balestier Khalsa	3 – 0	Tampines Rovers
Fadli 30'; Hazzuwan 56'; Aung 86'

Toa Payoh Stadium, Singapore
Referee: W Ravisanthiran

== Knockout phase ==
=== Bracket ===
Semi-finals		Final
(Japan) Albirex Niigata (S)	4
Geylang International	0	(Japan) Albirex Niigata (S)	1
(Brunei) DPMM FC	1	Warriors FC	0
Warriors FC	5

=== Semi-finals ===
18 July 2017
19:30 UTC+8

Albirex Niigata (S) (Japan)	4 – 0	Geylang International
Akiyama 28'; Sano 80' 82'; Nakai 88'

Jurong East Stadium, Singapore
Referee: Ahmad A'Qashah
18 July 2017
19:30 UTC+8

DPMM FC (Brunei)	1 – 5	Warriors FC
Shahrazen Said 77'		Ong 26'; Shahril 44' 53' 90' (pen.); Ciolacu 53'

Jalan Besar Stadium, Singapore
Referee: Muhd Taqi Aljaafari

=== Final ===
21 July 2017
19:30 UTC+8

Albirex Niigata (S) (Japan)	1 – 0	Warriors FC
Sano 110'

Jalan Besar Stadium, Singapore
Referee: G. Letchman

== Statistics ==
=== Scorers ===
As of matches played on 22 July 2017.

Rank	Player	Club	Goals
1	Shahril Ishak	Warriors FC	4
1	(Romania) Andrei Ciolacu	Warriors FC	4
1	(Japan) Tsubasa Sano	(Japan) Albirex Niigata (S)	4
4	Ifwat Ismail	Geylang International	3
4	(Brunei) Adi Said	(Brunei) DPMM FC	3
6	Amy Recha	Geylang International	2
6	(Croatia) Stipe Plazibat	Home United	2
6	(Brunei) Azwan Ali	(Brunei) DPMM FC	2
6	(Brunei) Shahrazen Said	(Brunei) DPMM FC	2
6	(Brunei) Maududi Hilmi Kasmi	(Brunei) DPMM FC	2
6	(Argentina) Ricardo Sendra	Geylang International	2
12	20 players		1

=== Own goals ===
Player	For	Against	Score	Date
Hafiz Sujad	Tampines Rovers	(Brunei) DPMM FC	1–5	8 July 2017
Ashrul Syafeeq	Balestier Khalsa	(Brunei) DPMM FC	0–3	11 July 2017

== Winners ==
2017 Singapore League Cup winner

4th title

== See also ==
- S.League
- Singapore FA Cup
- Singapore Cup
- Singapore Community Shield
- Football Association of Singapore
- List of football clubs in Singapore
