= 2017 Singapore Cup =

RHB Singapore Cup

Tournament details
- Country: Singapore
- Dates: 29 May 2017- 26 November 2017
- Teams: 12

Final positions
- Champions: Albirex Niigata (S)
- Runners-up: Global Cebu
- Third place: Home United

Tournament statistics
- Matches played: 18
- Goals scored: 75 (4.17 per match)
- Top goal scorer(s): (Trinidad and Tobago) Darryl Roberts (7 Goals)

The 2017 Singapore Cup (also known as the RHB Singapore Cup for sponsorship reasons) is the 20th edition of Singapore's annual premier club football knock-out tournament organised by the Football Association of Singapore. Albirex Niigata (S) are the defending champions, having won their first trophy the previous year.

This will be the first time in the competition's history where both finalists are both non-Singaporean clubs.

== Teams ==
A total of 12 teams participate in the 2017 Singapore Cup. 8 of the teams are from domestic S.League while the other four are invited from Cambodia and the Philippines. Young Lions will not be participating in this edition of the Singapore Cup.

S.League clubs

- Albirex Niigata (S) (Japan)
- Balestier Khalsa
- DPMM FC (Brunei)
- Geylang International
- Home United
- Hougang United
- Tampines Rovers
- Warriors FC

Invited foreign teams

- Boeung Ket Angkor (Cambodia)
- Ceres Negros (Philippines)
- Global Cebu (Philippines)
- Nagaworld FC (Cambodia)

== Format ==
Eight teams were drawn for the preliminary round while the other four seeded teams received a bye for that round. The eight teams will play against one another in a single-legged knockout basis. Winners of this round will progress and advance to the quarter-finals. Thereafter, matches are played in two legs with the exception of the one-match final.

For any match in the knockout stage, a draw after 90 minutes of regulation time is followed by two 15 minute periods of extra time to determine a winner. If the teams are still tied, a penalty shoot-out is held to determine a winner.

== Bracket ==
Preliminary round
Warriors FC	1
Boeung Ket	4
Geylang International	4 (2)
Global Cebu	4 (3)^{P}
Hougang United	1
Ceres Negros	0
Balestier Khalsa	3
Nagaworld	4

Quarter-finals
Tampines Rovers	1	0	1
Albirex Niigata (S)	5	2	7
DPMM FC	1	1	2
Home United	3	3	6
Boeung Ket	1	2	3
Global Cebu	3	1	4
Hougang United	4	4	8
Nagaworld	1	0	1

Semi-finals
Albirex Niigata (S)	3	2	5
Home United	1	1	2
Global Cebu	2	2	4
Hougang United	2	1	3

Final
Albirex Niigata (S)	2 (3) ^{P}
(Philippines) Global Cebu	2 (1)

== Preliminary round ==
The draw for the preliminary round was held on 9 May 2017 at Connaught Drive. Eight teams involved in this round will play in a single leg knockout basis. The matches will be played from 29 to 21 June 2017. Winners of this round will progress and advance to the quarter-finals.

29 May 2017
20:30 UTC+8

Warriors	1–4	Boeung Ket Angkor
Hafiz 78'		Omogba 53'; Laboravy 55', 75', 84'

Choa Chu Kang Stadium, Singapore
Referee: Nathan Chan

1 June 2017
20:30 UTC+8

Balestier Khalsa	3–4	Nagaworld
Hazzuwan 25', 69'; Raihan 56' (pen.)		Kipson 14'; Kelechi 23', 59'; Suhana 42'

Toa Payoh Stadium, Singapore
Referee: G Letchman

20 June 2017
20:30 UTC+8

Hougang United	1–0	Ceres Negros
Viterale 77'

Hougang Stadium, Singapore
Referee: Sukhbir Singh

21 June 2017
20:30 UTC+8

Geylang International	4–4 (a.e.t.)	Global Cebu
Ichikawa 15'; Ortega 45'; Quak 83' (pen.); Sendra 90'		Roberts 19', 39' (pen.), 53'; Minegishi (penalty missed); Clarino 75'
Penalties
	2–3

Jalan Besar Stadium, Singapore
Referee: Farhad Mohd

== Quarter-finals ==
The 4 winners from the preliminary round will join DPMM FC, Tampines Rovers, 2016 runner up, Albirex Niigata (S) and 2016 winner, Home United in the draw.

10 August 2017

Tampines Rovers	1–5	Albirex Niigata (S)
Shahdan 90+2' (pen.)		Nagasaki 26', 59'; Kumada 33'; Shoma Kondo 83'; Sakamoto 84'

Our Tampines Hub
Referee: Farhad Mohamed

13 August 2017

Albirex Niigata (S)	2–0	Tampines Rovers
Tanaka 30'; Motoda 45'

Jurong East Stadium
Referee: Jansen Foo

Albirex Niigata (S) won 7-1 on aggregate.

13 August 2017

DPMM FC	1–3	Home United
Ramazotti 60'		Juma'at 69'; Faris 72', 84'

Jalan Besar Stadium
Referee: Sukhbir Singh

16 August 2017

Home United	3–1	DPMM FC
Rifqi 64', 84'; Plazibat 90+1'		Hilmi Kasmi 48'

Bishan Stadium
Referee: Nathan Chan

Home United won 6-2 on aggregate.

8 August 2017
19:30 UTC+8

Boeung Ket Angkor	1–3	Global Cebu
Laboravy 53' (pen.)		Salenga 7', 68'; Bahadoran 45'

Jalan Besar Stadium
Referee: G.Letchman (Singapore)

11 August 2017

Global Cebu	1–2	Boeung Ket Angkor
Salenga 4'		Khoun Laboravy 10'; Esoh Omogba 65'

Jalan Besar Stadium
Referee: Muhd Taqi

Global Cebu won 4-3 on aggregate.

11 August 2017

Hougang United	4–1	Nagaworld FC
Kogure 15', 40'; Pablo 72'; Fairoz 85'		Kipson 59' (pen.)

Hougang Stadium
Referee: W Ravisanthiran

14 August 2017

Nagaworld FC	0–4	Hougang United
		Pablo 44', 69'; Fareez 66'; Syahiran 78'

Jalan Besar Stadium
Referee: Ahmad A'Qashah

Hougang United won 8-1 on aggregate.

== Semi-finals ==
27 September 2017
19:30 UTC+8

Albirex Niigata (S)	3–1	Home United
Nakai 4'; Kamata 58'; Nagasaki 76'		Faris 18'

Jurong East Stadium
Referee: Ahmad A'Qashah

30 September 2017
19:30 UTC+8

Home United	1–2	Albirex Niigata (S)
Faris 45'		Nagasaki 83'; Takuya Akiyama 86'

Bishan Stadium

Albirex won 5–2 on aggregate

27 September 2017
19:30 UTC+8

Global Cebu	2–2	Hougang United
Roberts 33', 68'		Singh 28'; Kwok 85'

Jalan Besar Stadium
Referee: Nathan Chan

30 September 2017
19:30 UTC+8

Hougang United	1–2	Global Cebu
Pablo 39'		Roberts 13', 72'

Hougang Stadium

Global Cebu won 4–3 on aggregate

== 3rd/4th placing ==
26 November 2017
20:00 UTC+8

Home United	1–0	Hougang United
Amiruldin Asraf 21'

Jalan Besar Stadium
Referee: Farhad Mohd (SIN)

== Finals ==
25 November 2017
20:00 UTC+8

Albirex Niigata (S)	2–2 (a.e.t.)	Global Cebu
Sano 32'; Nagasaki 95'		Wesley 48'; Salenga 112'
Penalties
Alikhil (penalty scored); Zazai (penalty scored); Hadid (penalty missed); Karimi (penalty scored); Faqiryar (penalty scored)	3–1	Alikhil (penalty scored); Zazai (penalty scored); Hadid (penalty missed); Karimi (penalty scored); Faqiryar (penalty scored)

Jalan Besar Stadium
Referee: Muhammad Taqi Aljaafari Bin Jahari (SIN)

== Season statistics ==
=== Top scorers ===
As of 4 December 2017

Rank	Player	Team	PR	QF1	QF2	SF1	SF2	F	Total
1	(Trinidad and Tobago) Darryl Roberts	Global Cebu	3	0	0	2	2	0	7
2	(Cambodia) Khoun Laboravy	Boeung Ket Angkor	3	1	1	0	0	0	5
2	(Japan) Kento Nagasaki	Albirex Niigata (S)	0	2	0	1	1	1	5
2	(Singapore) Faris Ramli	Home United	0	2	1	1	1	0	5
4	(Philippines) Paolo Salenga	Global Cebu	0	2	1	0	0	1	4
4	(Spain) Pablo Rodríguez	Hougang United	0	1	2	0	1	0	4

=== Hat-tricks ===
Player	For	Against	Result	Date	Reference
(Cambodia) Khoun Laboravy	(Cambodia) Boeung Ket Angkor	Warriors FC	4–1	29 May 2018	
(Trinidad and Tobago) Darryl Roberts	(Philippines) Global Cebu FC	Geylang International	4–4	21 June 2017	
