= Tsubasa Sano =

Japanese footballer (born 1994)

Tsubasa Sano 佐野 翼
Personal information
- Full name: Tsubasa Sano
- Date of birth: October 18, 1994 (age 32)
- Place of birth: Shizuoka, Japan
- Height: 1.76 m (5 ft 9 in)
- Position: Forward

Team information
- Current team: Criacao Shinjuku
- Number: 33

Youth career
- 2010–2012: Shimizu Commercial High School
- 2013–2016: Juntendo University

Senior career*
Years	Team	Apps	(Gls)
2017	Albirex Niigata (S)	21	(26)
2018–2019	Roasso Kumamoto	32	(4)
2020–2022	Nagano Parceiro	62	(9)
2023–	Criacao Shinjuku	0	(0)
- * Club domestic league appearances and goals as of 20 November 2022, 18:22 (UTC)

Tsubasa Sano (佐野 翼, Sano Tsubasa; born August 26, 1994 in Aichi, Japan) is a Japanese footballer. He is a forward, who plays for Criacao Shinjuku from 2023.

== Personal life ==
He was educated at and played for Shimizu Commercial High School & Juntendo University before moving to Singapore after his graduation in 2017.

== Club career ==
=== Albirex Niigata Singapore ===
Tsubasa signed his first professional contract with Albirex Niigata Singapore FC, a satellite team of J.League side Albirex Niigata, playing in the top tier of football in Singapore, the S.League.

He made his competitive debut in the 2017 Singapore Community Shield, which doubled up as the first league game of the season, against Tampines Rovers FC. Although he missed glaring chances in the game, he managed to win his first piece of silverware as the White Swans came out 2-1 winners in an ill-tempered match.

He scored his first goals for the club in a 5-0 demolition of the Garena Young Lions in match day 2 of the 2017 S.League season, bringing his tally to 2 goals in 2 games. He scored another brace in a 2-0 win over Hougang United FC, bringing his tally for the season to 5 goals in 5 games and helping his team to the top of the table. Tsubasa scored his 7th and 8th goals in the next match, helping Albirex to the top of the table and condemning Warriors FC to their first defeat of the season.

It proved to be a good season for Sano and the White Swans as the Japanese satellite club swept all four pieces of silverware on offer in Singapore for a second consecutive year. Sano proved to be very influential, scoring 26 league goals to finish as the 2017 S.League top scorer as well as scoring a goal in the 2017 Singapore Cup final to help Albirex secure their fourth piece of silverware of 2017. In total, he had 31 goals in all competitions.

=== Roasso Kumamoto ===
After his breakthrough season in the S.League, Sano secured a move to J2 League side Roasso Kumamoto.

=== Nagano Parceiro ===
In 2020, Sano officially joined J3 club Nagano Parceiro. He left the club in the end of the 2022 season, after two seasons at the club.

=== Criacao Shinjuku ===
In 2023, Sano officially joined to JFL club Criacao Shinjuku.

== Club career statistics ==
As of the end of the 2022 season.

Club performance			League		Cup		League Cup		Total	
Season	Club	League	Apps	Goals	Apps	Goals	Apps	Goals	Apps	Goals
Singapore			League		Singapore Cup		League Cup		Total	
2017	Albirex Niigata FC (S)	S.League	21	26	3	1	5	3	29	30
Total
Total	Singapore		21	26	3	1	5	3	29	30
Japan			League		Cup		League Cup		Total	
2018	Roasso Kumamoto	J2 League	9	0	1	0	–		10	0
2019	Roasso Kumamoto	J3 League	23	4	2	0	–		25	4
Total
Total	Japan		32	4	3	0	–		35	4
2020	AC Nagano Parceiro	J3 League	32	7	0	0	–		32	7
2021	AC Nagano Parceiro	J3 League	16	2	1	1	–		17	3
2022	AC Nagano Parceiro	J3 League	14	0	0	0	–		14	0
Total
Total	Japan		62	9	1	1	–		63	10
2023	Criacao Shinjuku	Japan Football League	0	0	0	0	–		0	0
Total
Total	Japan		0	0	0	0	–		0	0
Career total			115	39	7	2	5	3	127	44

== Honours ==
=== Club ===
Albirex Niigata Singapore

- S.League: 2017
- Singapore Cup: 2017
- Singapore League Cup: 2017
- Singapore Community Shield: 2017

=== Individual ===
- S.League Top Scorer: 2017
