= Shuto Inaba =

Japanese footballer

Shuto Inaba 稲葉 修土
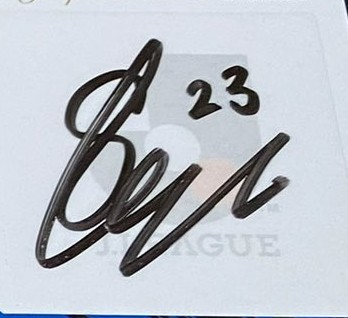

Personal information
- Full name: Shuto Inaba
- Date of birth: June 29, 1993 (age 33)
- Place of birth: Osaka, Japan
- Height: 1.72 m (5 ft 7 1/2 in)
- Position: Midfielder

Team information
- Current team: Kagoshima United
- Number: 19

Youth career
- 2009–2011: Rissho University Shonan High School

College career
Years	Team	Apps	(Gls)
2012–2015	Fukuoka University		

Senior career*
Years	Team	Apps	(Gls)
2016–2017	Albirex Niigata (S)	45	(2)
2018–2020	Kataller Toyama	54	(0)
2021–2022	Blaublitz Akita	73	(0)
2023–2024	Machida Zelvia	23	(0)
2024	→ Kagoshima United (loan)	8	(0)
2025–	Kagoshima United	30	(1)
- * Club domestic league appearances and goals as of 18 August 2026

Shuto Inaba (稲葉 修土, Inaba Shūto; born June 29, 1990 in Osaka, Japan) is a Japanese football player who plays as a midfielder for Kagoshima United.

== Personal life ==
Inaba graduated with first-class honours in Sports Science from Fukuoka University.

== Career ==
=== Albirex Niigata Singapore ===
Inaba signed for Albirex Niigata Singapore in the S.League in 2016 after graduation from Fukuoka University. He was signed after Albirex Niigata (S) chairman Daisuke Korenaga had watched a few of Inaba's games in his university tournaments and called him two weeks after to offer a contract. Inaba had a good season for the team as Albirex became the first team in Singapore to win all 4 trophies on offer in Singapore.

He extended his contract for the 2017 season, becoming only one of six players from last season to remain at the club. Inaba was handed the captaincy of the team for the 2017 season. During the September international break, he was selected to participate in a week-long training stint with his parent club. He traveled to Niigata prefecture with defensive stalwart Yasutaka Yanagi and the duo trained with the first team, playing in a training match against Iwaki FC, a non-J League team. He made 24 appearances in the league and scored two goals as the team retained the S.League title. He also led the team to repeat last season's feat, as the team won all 4 trophies on offer again.

=== Kataller Toyama ===
Inaba's stellar performances in the S.League saw Inaba secure a move back to Japan for the 2018 season, signing for J3 League side Kataller Toyama. He make his club debut on 11 March 2018 in a league match against FC Ryukyu playing the full match.

=== Blaublitz Akita ===
On 9 January 2021, Inaba moved to J2 League club Blaublitz Akita. He made his debut for the club on 28 February 2021 in a league match against Thespa Gunma in which he assisted Keita Saito.

=== Machida Zelvia ===
On 25 November 2022, Inaba moved to another J2 League club Machida Zelvia. He make his club debut on 19 February 2023 in a goalless draw against Vegalta Sendai. Inaba was part of the squad that won the 2023 J2 League, which was the first time in the club's history they had been promoted to the J1 League.

=== Loan to Kagoshima United ===
On 16 July 2024, Inaba was announced at Kagoshima United. He made his league debut against Fujieda MYFC on 3 August 2024.

== Club career statistics ==
As of 25 November 2022.

Club performance			League		Cup		League Cup		Total	
Season	Club	League	Apps	Goals	Apps	Goals	Apps	Goals	Apps	Goals
Singapore			League		Cup		League Cup		Total	
2016	Albirex Niigata (S)	S.League	21	0	5	0	5	1	31	1
2017	Albirex Niigata (S)	S.League	24	2	5	0	5	0	34	2
Japan			League		Cup		League Cup		Total	
2013	Fukuoka University	-	–		2	0	–		2	0
2014	Fukuoka University	-	–		2	0	–		2	0
2015	Fukuoka University	-	–		1	0	–		1	0
2018	Kataller Toyama	J3 League	9	0	2	0	–		11	0
2019	Kataller Toyama	J3 League	18	0	2	0	–		20	0
2020	Kataller Toyama	J3 League	27	0	0	0	–		27	0
2021	Blaublitz Akita	J2 League	41	0	0	0	–		41	0
2022	Blaublitz Akita	J2 League	32	0	0	0	–		32	0
Career total			172	2	19	0	10	1	201	3

== Honours ==
=== Club ===
==== Albirex Niigata (S) ====
- S.League: 2016, 2017
- Singapore Cup: 2016, 2017
- Singapore League Cup: 2016, 2017
- Singapore Community Shield: 2016, 2017

==== Machida Zelvia ====
- J2 League: 2023
