= Andrei Ciolacu =

Romanian footballer

Personal information
- Full name: Andrei Cosmin Ciolacu
- Date of birth: 9 August 1992 (age 34)
- Place of birth: Bucharest, Romania
- Height: 1.85 m (6 ft 1 in)
- Position: Striker

Team information
- Current team: Cassino
- Number: 9

Youth career
- 2002–2004: Inter Gaz București
- 2005–2010: Rapid București

Senior career*
Years	Team	Apps	(Gls)
2009–2011	Rapid II București	24	(6)
2011–2014	Rapid București	59	(7)
2012	→ Otopeni (loan)	13	(7)
2015	Śląsk Wrocław	0	(0)
2015	Śląsk Wrocław II	20	(12)
2016–2017	ASA Târgu Mureș	36	(2)
2017	Warriors FC	11	(3)
2018	Juventus București	4	(0)
2018	Metaloglobus București	8	(0)
2019	Tskhinvali	16	(3)
2020	Avezzano	5	(0)
2020–2021	FC U Craiova	20	(4)
2021–2023	Floriana	38	(9)
2023–2024	Birkirkara	34	(13)
2024–2026	Valletta	29	(15)
2026–	Cassino	1	(0)

International career
2012–2013	Romania U21	3	(0)
- * Club domestic league appearances and goals as of 27 September 2026

Andrei Cosmin Ciolacu (born 9 August 1992) is a Romanian professional footballer who plays as a striker for Eccellenza Lazio club Cassino.

== Career ==
In January 2016, Ciolacu signed a contract with ASA Târgu Mureș.

Midway through 2017, Ciolacu signed for Singaporean club Warriors, integrating quickly into the team.

On his Singapore League Cup debut against Home United, Ciolacu scored three goals, taking his club to the top of the group. In December 2017, he said that "The speed of play in Singapore is lower than in Romania, and the players do not give much importance to physical training, although this matters a lot in modern football. There is room for improvement, of course, but there is fantastic potential for development."

On 24 January 2020, Ciolacu joined Italian Serie D club Avezzano. He played for the club until the summer 2020, where he moved back to Romania to join FC U Craiova 1948.

== Honours ==
FC U Craiova

- Liga II: 2020–21

Floriana

- Maltese FA Trophy: 2021–22
- Maltese Super Cup runner-up: 2022

Birkirkara

- Maltese FA Trophy: 2022–23

Valletta

- Maltese Challenge League: 2024–25
