= Maududi Hilmi Kasmi =

Bruneian footballer

Maududi Hilmi
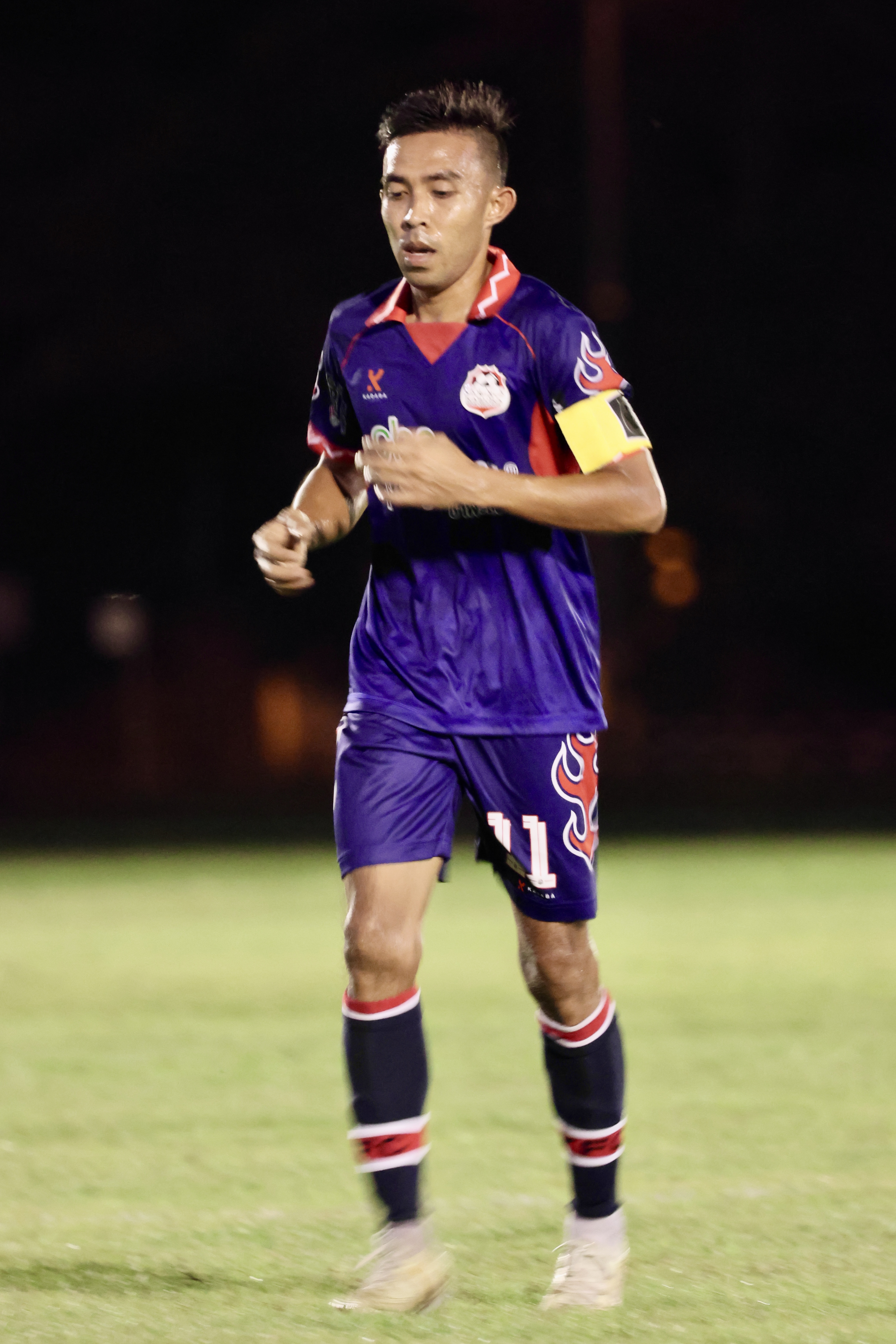
- Maududi with Kasuka 2024

Personal information
- Full name: Muhammad Maududi Hilmi bin Kasmi
- Date of birth: 5 February 1989 (age 37)
- Place of birth: Brunei
- Height: 1.68 m (5 ft 6 in)
- Position: Midfielder

Team information
- Current team: Kasuka FC
- Number: 11

Senior career*
| Years | Team | Apps | (Gls) |
| 2007–2009 | DPMM | | |
| 2009–2010 | AH United | | |
| 2011 | KKSJ Penjara | | |
| 2012–2013 | Majra | | |
| 2013–2014 | Najip | | (1) |
| 2014–2017 | DPMM | 52 | (6) |
| 2018– | Kasuka | | (15) |

International career^{‡}
| 2005 | Brunei U20 | | |
| 2008–2022 | Brunei | 14 | (0) |
- * Club domestic league appearances and goals as of 20 January 2026 ‡ National team caps and goals as of 30 July 2023

Muhammad Maududi Hilmi bin Kasmi (born 5 February 1989) is a Bruneian professional footballer who plays as a midfielder for Brunei Super League club Kasuka. He has played for professional club DPMM FC for four seasons in the Singaporean S.League.

== Club career ==
Maududi burst into the scene as a young midfielder for DPMM back when they were playing in the Malaysian Super League in 2007. After DPMM was expelled from the S.League in 2008, he became a journeyman in the local leagues, turning out for AH United, KKSJ Penjara (The Prisons Department), Majra FC, and Najip FC. He finally re-signed with DPMM in 2014.

Midway through the following season, Maududi impressed Steve Kean enough to be handed a rare starting berth for the suspended Joe Gamble against Harimau Muda on 12 September 2015. He duly scored the opening goal, his first in the S.League. He became a starting regular in the second half of the season, which ended with DPMM as title-winners.

Maududi was released by DPMM in the 2017 close season. He joined Kasuka FC for the start of the 2018-19 Brunei Super League season. He scored his first goal in an 11–0 victory over Setia Perdana on 29 October.

In Kasuka's opening game of the 2021 Brunei Super League season, Maududi scored four goals in a 1–11 victory over Panchor Murai FC.

Maududi featured extensively in 2022 for Kasuka at the 2022 Brunei FA Cup, scoring the opener in the first leg of the semi-final against MS ABDB. The team went down 2–1 to Maududi's former team DPMM FC in the final on 4 December.

In 2023, Maududi was appointed team captain after the retirement of Sairol Sahari. He led the team to their first ever Brunei Super League triumph, going 16 matches unbeaten.

== International career ==
Maududi made his first international appearance for Brunei on 15 May 2008 in the 2008 AFC Challenge Cup qualification held in the Philippines, coming on for Ahmad Hafiz Said in the 53rd minute against Bhutan. His further involvement with the Wasps came in the 2008, 2014 and 2016 editions of the qualifying round of the AFF Suzuki Cup, as well as the 2016 AFC Solidarity Cup.

== Honours ==
=== Team ===
DPMM FC

- S.League: 2015
- Singapore League Cup: 2014

Kasuka FC

- Brunei Super League (2): 2023, 2024–25
