= Pablo Rodríguez (footballer, born 1985) =

Spanish footballer

Personal information
- Full name: Pablo Rodríguez Aracil
- Date of birth: 20 July 1985 (age 41)
- Place of birth: Valencia, Spain
- Height: 1.90 m (6 ft 3 in)
- Position: Forward

Youth career
- 2002–2003: Levante
- 2003–2004: Valencia

Senior career*
Years	Team	Apps	(Gls)
2004–2005	Puçol	30	(22)
2005–2006	La Oliva	25	(15)
2006–2007	Almería B	16	(8)
2007–2008	Toledo	10	(5)
2008	Olímpic Xàtiva	11	(6)
2008–2009	Ethnikos Achna	8	(4)
2009	Mazarrón	15	(10)
2009–2010	Mioveni	12	(4)
2010	Bray Wanderers	5	(0)
2010–2011	La Muela	10	(2)
2011	Altea	12	(1)
2011–2012	Rayo Cantabria	15	(9)
2012–2013	United Sikkim	8	(1)
2013	Marathón	9	(2)
2014	Kaya	6	(6)
2014	Brumunddal	12	(8)
2015	Maziya S&RC	27	(17)
2016	Madura United	30	(14)
2017	Hougang United	12	(2)
- * Club domestic league appearances and goals

Pablo Rodríguez Aracil (born 20 July 1985) is a Spanish former professional footballer who played as a forward.

== Career ==
A youth graduate of local Levante UD and Valencia CF, Valencia-born Rodríguez only played lower league or amateur football in his country, representing UD Puçol, CD La Oliva, UD Almería B, CD Toledo, CD Olímpic de Xàtiva, Mazarrón CF, CD La Muela – his first Segunda División B experience, with the 2010–11 season ending in relegation – UD Altea and Deportivo Rayo Cantabria.

Abroad, Rodríguez started with Ethnikos Achna FC in the Cypriot First Division in 2008, moving to CS Mioveni in the Romanian Liga II the following year. After a brief spell in the Republic of Ireland, he returned to his homeland.

In the 2013 January transfer window, Rodríguez signed with United Sikkim F.C. in India. He made his first appearance in the I-League on 2 February, in a 1–2 loss against Shillong Lajong FC.

On 12 August 2013, Rodríguez joined Liga Nacional de Honduras side C.D. Marathón, his signing marking the seventh country he had played in. He made his debut on 8 September, scoring in a 1–2 home defeat to Deportes Savio.

On 17 March 2014, Rodríguez signed a contract with Kaya F.C. in the Philippines. He netted four goals in his first four matches, including two in a 3–1 away victory over Loyola Meralco Sparks FC.

Rodríguez moved teams and countries again in July 2014, signing for Brumunddal Fotball in Norway. He made his debut in the 2. divisjon against Valdres FK, scoring a hat-trick in a 4–0 home win.

In January 2015, Rodríguez joined Maldivian Dhivehi Premier League club Maziya S&RC. He went on to score 14 goals for Indonesia's Madura United F.C. before signing for S.League side Hougang United FC, but struggled initially at his new team.

== Honours ==
Maziya S&RC

- Maldivian FA Charity Shield: 2015
