= Takuya Akiyama =

Japanese footballer (born 1994)

Takuya Akiyama 秋山 拓也
Personal information
- Full name: Takuya Akiyama
- Date of birth: August 26, 1994 (age 32)
- Place of birth: Toyota, Aichi, Japan
- Height: 1.83 m (6 ft 0 in)
- Position: Defender

Team information
- Current team: Osaka
- Number: 23

Youth career
- 2002–2006: Honan JFT
- 2007–2009: SC Toyota
- 2010–2012: Aichi Sangyo Univ. Mikawa High School

College career
Years	Team	Apps	(Gls)
2013–2016	Osaka University H&SS		

Senior career*
Years	Team	Apps	(Gls)
2017	Albirex Niigata (S)	24	(1)
2018	Ventforet Kofu	1	(0)
2019–2020	Tokushima Vortis	2	(0)
2021–2024	AC Nagano Parceiro	61	(1)
2024–	Osaka	68	(7)
- * Club domestic league appearances and goals as of 18 August 2026

Takuya Akiyama (秋山 拓也, Akiyama Takuya; born August 26, 1994 in Aichi, Japan) is a Japanese footballer who plays as a defender for Osaka.

== Career ==
=== Albirex Niigata (S) ===
Akiyama joined Albirex Niigata S on 7 January 2017. He made his league debut against Tampines Rovers on 26 February 2017. Akiyama scored his first league goal against Young Lions on 4 March 2017, scoring in the 18th minute.

=== Ventforet Kofu ===
Akiyama joined Ventforet Kofu on 28 December 2017. He sent them a promotional video which made Kofu sign him. He made his league debut against Zweigen Kanazawa on 4 July 2018.

=== Tokushima Vortis ===
On 30 January 2019, it was announced that Akiyama had suffered a left hamstring tear that would keep him out for eight weeks. He made his league debut against Machida Zelvia on 8 June 2019.

=== AC Nagano Parceiro ===
Akiyama joined AC Nagano Parceiro on 6 January 2021. He made his league debut against Grulla Morioka on 28 March 2021. Akiyama scored his first league goal against Sagamihara on 15 April 2023, scoring in the 51st minute.

=== Osaka ===
Akiyama joined Osaka after his contract expired with AC Nagano Parceiro. He made his league debut against Nagano Parceiro on 25 February 2024.

== Club career statistics ==
As of end of 3 Sept 2023.

Club performance			League		Cup		League Cup		Total	
Season	Club	League	Apps	Goals	Apps	Goals	Apps	Goals	Apps	Goals
Singapore			League		Singapore Cup		League Cup		Total	
2017	Albirex Niigata FC (S)	S.League	24	1	4	1	5	1	33	3
Japan			League		Emperor's Cup		J.League Cup		Total	
2018	Ventforet Kofu	J2 League	1	0	3	0	4	0	8	0
2019	Tokushima Vortis	J2 League	2	0	2	0	0	0	4	0
2020	Tokushima Vortis	J2 League	0	0	0	0	0	0	0	0
2021	AC Nagano Parceiro	J3 League	25	2	1	0	0	0	26	2
2022	AC Nagano Parceiro	J3 League	20	0	0	0	0	0	20	0
2023	AC Nagano Parceiro	J3 League	26	2	0	0	0	0	26	2
2024	FC Osaka	J3 League	28	4	0	0	0	0	28	4
2025	FC Osaka	J3 League	10	0	0	0	0	0	10	0
Career total			98	5	10	1	9	1	117	7
