= 2015 Warriors FC season =

Warriors
2015 season
- Chairman: (Singapore) Philip Lam Tin Sing
- Head coach: (England) Alex Weaver (Till Oct 2015) (Morocco) Karim Bencherifa (since Oct 2015)
- Stadium: Choa Chu Kang Stadium

The 2015 season was Warriors' 20th consecutive season in the top flight of Singapore football and in the S.League. Along with the S.League, the club also competed in the Prime League, the Singapore Cup and the Singapore League Cup.

== Squad ==
=== S.League squad ===
As of 24 February 2017.

Squad No.	Name	Nationality	Date of birth (age)	Previous club
Goalkeepers
1	Shahul Rayyan	(Singapore)	12 February 1995 (age 31)	(Singapore) Young Lions FC
13	Daniel Ong	(Singapore)	31 January 1989 (age 37)	(Singapore) Home United
40	Nur Amin	(Singapore)	5 June 1995 (age 31)	Youth Team
Defenders
2	Marus Wheeler	(Singapore)	27 December 1994 (age 31)	(Singapore) Tanjong Pagar United
3	Marin Vidošević	(Singapore)	9 October 1986 (age 40)	(Croatia) NK Imotski
4	Syaqir Sulaiman	(Singapore)	12 August 1986 (age 40)	(Singapore) Hougang United
5	Kento Fukuda	(Japan)	15 May 1990 (age 36)	(Singapore) Geylang International
16	Daniel Bennett	(Singapore) (England)	7 January 1978 (age 48)	(Singapore) Woodlands Wellington
18	Nur Aysidiq	(Singapore)	1 September 1983 (age 43)	(Singapore) Balestier Khalsa
19	Irwan Shah	(Singapore)	2 November 1988 (age 38)	(Singapore) LionsXII
20	Hamqaamal Shah	(Singapore)	5 September 1986 (age 40)	(Singapore) Gombak United
Midfielders
5	Azlan Razak	(Singapore)	6 September 1993 (age 33)	Youth Team
6	Thomas Beattie	(Singapore)	16 September 1986 (age 40)	(Singapore) Hougang United
7	Shi Jiayi	(Singapore) (China)	2 September 1983 (age 43)	(Singapore) Home United
8	Emmeric Ong	(Singapore)	25 January 1991 (age 35)	(Singapore) LionsXII
11	Fazli Jaffar	(Singapore)	5 September 1983 (age 43)	(Singapore) Hougang United
12	Hafsyar Farkhan	(Singapore)	16 April 1988 (age 38)	Youth Team
14	Kevin McCann	(Scotland)	11 September 1987 (age 39)	(Scotland) Raith Rovers F.C.
17	Andy Ahmad	(Singapore)	5 April 1991 (age 35)	(Singapore) Woodlands Wellington
21	Hafiz Rahim	(Singapore)	19 November 1983 (age 42)	(Singapore) Home United
25	Karlo Ivancic	(Singapore)	24 July 1994 (age 32)	(Croatia) NK Bistra
35	Fatemy Firdouse	(Singapore)	29 June 1995 (age 31)	Youth Team
Strikers
9	Miroslav Pejić	(Croatia)	16 February 1986 (age 40)	(Croatia) NK Samobor
10	Nicolás Vélez	(Argentina)	4 July 1990 (age 36)	(Spain) Atlético Sanluqueño CF
15	Fazrul Nawaz	(Singapore)	17 April 1985 (age 41)	(Malaysia) Sabah FA
33	Hazim Faiz	(Singapore)	28 September 1995 (age 31)	Youth Team
Players leaving during the season
1	Neezam Aziz	(Singapore)	25 April 1991 (age 35)	Youth team

== Coaching staff ==
Position	Name	Ref.
Head coach	(Singapore) Razif Onn	
Assistant coach	(Singapore) Muhammad Effendi Bin Rahmat	
Assistant coach / Goalkeeping Coach	(Singapore) Lee Bee Seng	
Team manager	(Singapore) Eugene Cheang	
Fitness trainer	(Singapore) Silas Abdul Karim Bin Noor Shah	
Sports trainer	(Singapore) Benjamin Bhagawat	

== Transfers ==
=== Pre-season transfers ===
==== In ====
Position	Player	Transferred From	Ref
GK	(Singapore) Shahul Rayyan	(Singapore) Young Lions FC	
GK	(Singapore) Daniel Ong	(Singapore) Warriors FC	
DF	(Singapore) Syaqir Sulaiman	(Singapore) Warriors FC	
MF	(Singapore) Fazli Jaffar	(Singapore) Hougang United	
MF	(Singapore) Hamqaamal Shah	(Singapore) Geylang International	
MF	(Croatia) Karlo Ivancic	(Croatia) NK Bistra	
FW	(Singapore) Fazrul Nawaz	(Malaysia) Sabah FA	

==== Out ====
Position	Player	Transferred To	Ref
GK	(Singapore) Hassan Sunny	(Thailand) Army United F.C.	
DF	(Singapore) Zulfadli Zainal Abidin	(Singapore) Tampines Rovers	
DF	(Singapore) Ismail Yunos	(Singapore) Tampines Rovers	
DF	(Singapore) Jeremy Chiang		
MF	(Singapore) Dharham Aziz		
MF	(Singapore) Chiang Guo Guang		
MF	(Singapore) Nurhazwan Norasikin		
MF	(Singapore) Amin Rossady		
MF	(Singapore) Fazli Jaffar	(Singapore) Hougang United	
MF	(Singapore) Suria Prakasah	(Singapore) Young Lions FC	
MF	(Singapore) Zulfadhli Emran		
FW	(Singapore) (Nigeria) Agu Casmir		

== Team statistics ==
=== Appearances and goals ===
Numbers in parentheses denote appearances as substitute.

No.	Pos.	Player	Sleague		Singapore Cup		League Cup		Total	
No.	Pos.	Player	Apps.	Goals	Apps.	Goals	Apps.	Goals	Apps.	Goals
1	GK	(Singapore) Shahul Rayyan	6	0	0	0	0	0	0	0
2	DF	(Singapore) Marcus Wheeler	6	0	0	0	0	0	0	0
3	DF	(Singapore) Marin Vidošević	24	1	0	0	0	0	24	1
4	DF	(Singapore) Syaqir Sulaiman	21	0	0	0	0	0	21	0
5	DF	(Singapore) Azlan Razak	6	1	0	0	0	0	6	1
6	MF	(England) Thomas Beattie	14	4	0	0	0	0	14	4
7	MF	(Singapore) (China) Shi Jiayi	16	2	0	0	0	0	16	2
8	MF	(Singapore) Emmeric Ong	25	0	0	0	0	0	25	0
9	FW	(Croatia) Miroslav Pejić	24	6	0	0	0	0	24	6
10	FW	(Argentina) Nicolás Vélez	12	8	0	0	0	0	12	8
11	MF	(Singapore) Fazli Jaffar	8	0	0	0	0	0	8	0
12	MF	(Singapore) Hafsyar Farkhan	9	0	0	0	0	0	9	0
13	GK	(Singapore) Daniel Ong	18	0	0	0	0	0	18	0
14	MF	(Scotland) Kevin McCann	21	1	0	0	0	0	21	1
15	FW	(Singapore) Fazrul Nawaz	24	18	0	0	0	0	24	18
16	DF	(Singapore) (England) Daniel Bennett	27	0	0	0	0	0	27	0
17	MF	(Singapore) Andy Ahmad	6	0	0	0	0	0	6	0
18	DF	(Singapore) Nur Aysidiq	9	0	0	0	0	0	9	0
19	DF	(Singapore) Irwan Shah	27	1	0	0	0	0	27	1
20	DF	(Singapore) Hamqaamal Shah	7	0	0	0	0	0	7	0
21	FW	(Singapore) Hafiz Rahim	27	2	0	0	0	0	27	2
25	MF	(Croatia) Karlo Ivancic	15	0	0	0	0	0	15	0
35	MF	(Singapore) Fatemy Firdouse	1	0	0	0	0	0	1	0
40	GK	(Singapore) Nur Amin	3	0	0	0	0	0	3	0
Players who have played this season but had left the club or on loan to other club
1	GK	(Singapore) Neezam Aziz	3	0	0	0	0	0	3	0

== Competitions ==
=== S.League ===
Win Draw Loss

==== Round 1 ====
1 March 2015	Warriors	1–0	Balestier Khalsa	Kallang, Singapore
19:30 UTC+8		Details		Stadium: Jalan Besar Stadium

5 March 2015	Harimau Muda	1–3	Warriors	Malacca, Malaysia
20:00 UTC+8		Details		Stadium: Hang Jebat Stadium

14 March 2015	Warriors	0–6	Albirex Niigata (S)	Woodlands, Singapore
19:30 UTC+8		Details		Stadium: Woodlands Stadium

5 April 2015	Home United	1–4	Warriors	Yishun, Singapore
19:30 UTC+8		Details		Stadium: Yishun Stadium

9 April 2015	Warriors	1–0	Hougang United	Woodlands, Singapore
19:30 UTC+8		Details		Stadium: Woodlands Stadium

17 April 2015	Tampines Rovers	2–3	Warriors	Kallang, Singapore
19:30 UTC+8		Details		Stadium: Jalan Besar Stadium

20 April 2015	Courts Young Lions	1–2	Warriors	Kallang, Singapore
19:30 UTC+8		Details		Stadium: Jalan Besar Stadium

24 April 2015	Warriors	1–3	Brunei DPMM	Kallang, Singapore
19:30 UTC+8		Details		Stadium: Jalan Besar Stadium

2 May 2015	Geylang International	3–1	Warriors	Bedok, Singapore
19:30 UTC+8		Details		Stadium: Bedok Stadium

==== Round 2 ====
7 May 2015	Balestier Khalsa	1–2	Warriors	Toa Payoh, Singapore
19:30 UTC+8		Details		Stadium: Toa Payoh Stadium

18 May 2015	Albirex Niigata (S)	0–4	Warriors	Jurong East, Singapore
19:30 UTC+8		Details		Stadium: Jurong East Stadium

23 July 2015	Warriors	0–2	Courts Young Lions	Woodlands, Singapore
19:30 UTC+8		Details		Stadium: Woodlands Stadium

30 July 2015	Warriors	2–2	Home United	Choa Chu Kang, Singapore
19:30 UTC+8		Details		Stadium: Choa Chu Kang Stadium

4 August 2015	Hougang United	4–1	Warriors	Hougang, Singapore
19:30 UTC+8		Details		Stadium: Hougang Stadium

7 August 2015	Warriors	2–1	Tampines Rovers	Choa Chu Kang, Singapore
19:30 UTC+8		Details		Stadium: Choa Chu Kang Stadium

19 August 2015	Brunei DPMM	2–0	Warriors	Bandar Seri Begawan, Brunei
20:15 UTC+8		Details		Stadium: Hassanal Bolkiah National Stadium

23 August 2015	Warriors	0–2	Harimau Muda	Choa Chu Kang, Singapore
19:30 UTC+8		Details		Stadium: Choa Chu Kang Stadium

29 August 2015	Warriors	1–1	Geylang International	Choa Chu Kang, Singapore
19:30 UTC+8		Details		Stadium: Choa Chu Kang Stadium

==== Round 3 ====
13 September 2015	Warriors	4–2	Balestier Khalsa	Kallang, Singapore
19:30 UTC+8		Details		Stadium: Jalan Besar Stadium

19 September 2015	Harimau Muda	2–2	Warriors	Malacca, Malaysia
20:00 UTC+8		Details		Stadium: Hang Jebat Stadium

16 October 2015	Courts Young Lions	2–1	Warriors	Kallang, Singapore
19:30 UTC+8		Details		Stadium: Jalan Besar Stadium

21 October 2015	Home United	2–1	Warriors	Yishun, Singapore
19:30 UTC+8		Details		Stadium: Yishun Stadium

26 October 2015	Warriors	2–0	Hougang United	Choa Chu Kang, Singapore
19:30 UTC+8		Details		Stadium: Choa Chu Kang Stadium

30 October 2015	Warriors	1–2	Albirex Niigata (S)	Choa Chu Kang, Singapore
19:30 UTC+8		Details		Stadium: Choa Chu Kang Stadium

2 November 2015	Tampines Rovers	0–0	Warriors	Jurong West, Singapore
19:30 UTC+8		Details		Stadium: Jurong West Stadium

6 November 2015	Warriors	1–3	Brunei DPMM	Choa Chu Kang, Singapore
19:30 UTC+8		Details		Stadium: Choa Chu Kang Stadium

20 November 2015	Geylang International	6–0	Warriors	Bedok, Singapore
19:30 UTC+8		Details		Stadium: Bedok Stadium

Pos	Team	Pld	W	D	L	GF	GA	GD	Pts	Qualification
3	(Japan) Albirex Niigata (S) (Note: The three foreign clubs – Albirex Niigata (S), DPMM FC and Harimau Muda – as well as the Football Association of Singapore (FAS) under-23 team, Young Lions, are not eligible for any AFC competition spots.)	27	13	6	8	27	17	+10	45	
4	Balestier Khalsa	27	12	8	7	39	35	+4	44	Qualification to AFC Cup Group Stage
5	Warriors FC	27	11	4	12	40	51	−11	37	
6	Home United	27	9	9	9	38	34	+4	36	
7	(Malaysia) Harimau Muda B	27	9	6	12	29	40	−11	33	

Source: S.League
Rules for classification: 1) points; 2) goal difference; 3) number of goals scored; 4) number of wins

=== Singapore Cup ===
Win Draw Loss

Warriors FC	1–2	Home United	Choa Chu Kang Stadium
Ivančić 57'		Ilsø 55', 70'

Home United	2–0	Warriors FC	Bishan Stadium
Begue 38'; Sahib 90'

=== Singapore TNP League Cup ===
==== Group matches ====
Win Draw Loss

=== Group B ===
Pos	Team	Pld	W	D	L	GF	GA	GD	Pts	Qualification
1	Balestier Khalsa	2	1	1	0	6	2	+4	4	Advance to semi-final
2	Warriors	2	1	0	1	1	4	−3	3	
3	Tampines Rovers	2	0	1	1	2	3	−1	1	

Source: S.League

22 June 2015	Balestier Khalsa	4–0	Warriors FC	Toa Payoh Stadium
20:30 UTC+8	Krištić 43', 48', 90'; Ang 74'			Referee: Jansen Foo

26 June 2015	Tampines Rovers	2–2	Balestier Khalsa	Jurong West Stadium
20:30 UTC+8	Mustafić 52'; Roskam 58'		Zulkiffli 54'; Fadhil 71'	Referee: Sukhbir Singh

1 July 2015	Warriors FC	1–0	Tampines Rovers	Woodlands Stadium
20:30 UTC+8	Vélez 37'			Referee: Muhd Taqi
