= 2016 Balestier Khalsa FC season =

Balestier Khalsa
2016 season
- Chairman: Thavaneson
- Head coach: Marko Kraljević
- Stadium: Toa Payoh Stadium

The 2016 season was Balestier Khalsa's 21st consecutive season in the top flight of Singapore football and in the S.League. Along with the S.League, the club club also competed in the Prime League, the Singapore Cup and the Singapore League Cup.

== Squad ==
=== S.League squad ===
As of 31 December 2016.

Squad No.	Name	Date of birth (age)	Previous club
Goalkeepers
1	Daniel Ong	31 January 1989 (age 37)	Singapore Cricket Club
16	Naqiuddin Nodin	12 August 1994 (age 32)	
19	Zaiful Nizam	24 July 1987 (age 39)	
22	Ameerul Shafiq	9 March 1992 (age 34)	Admiralty FC
Defenders
2	Fadli Kamis	7 November 1992 (age 34)	(Singapore) Young Lions
3	Hanafi Salleh	10 September 1989 (age 37)	
4	(Serbia) Emir Lotinac	25 September 1987 (age 39)	(Serbia) Novi Pazar
6	Nurullah Hussein	9 May 1993 (age 33)	(Singapore) Young Lions
12	Sheikh Abdul Hadi	24 March 1992 (age 34)	
18	Ahmad Syahir	10 April 1992 (age 34)	
20	Ho Wai Loon	20 August 1993 (age 33)	
Midfielders
5	Shah Hirul	7 May 1986 (age 40)	
7	Zulkiffli Hassim	26 March 1986 (age 40)	Gombak United
13	Jamil Ali	15 September 1983 (age 43)	Tampines Rovers
14	Fazli Ayob	24 June 1990 (age 36)	Home United
15	Fadhil Noh	4 March 1989 (age 37)	Woodlands Wellington FC
17	Syafiq Zainal	19 July 1991 (age 35)	LionsXII
24	Hazzuwan Halim	2 February 1994 (age 32)	
25	Gary Loo	22 April 1992 (age 34)	
27	(Serbia) Sadin Smajović	7 June 1988 (age 38)	(Serbia) FK Javor Ivanjica
Strikers
9	(Croatia) Niko Tokić	7 June 1988 (age 38)	(Croatia) NK Hrvatski Dragovoljac
11	(Croatia) Miroslav Krištić	14 February 1990 (age 36)	(Croatia) NK Imotski
21	Danial Tan	4 August 1994 (age 32)	

== Coaching staff ==
Position	Name
Head coach	(Croatia) Marko Kraljević
Assistant coach	D. Tokijan
Goalkeeping coach	Rizal Abdul Rahman
Fitness coach	Rosman Sulaiman
Team Chairman	Thavaneson Selvaratnam
Physiotherapist	Mohamed Nasser
Kitman	Abdul Latiff

== Transfer ==
=== Pre-season transfers ===
==== In ====
Position	Player	Transferred from	Ref
GK	Daniel Ong	Warriors FC	
GK	Ameerul Shafiq	Admiralty FC	
DF	Fadli Kamis	Courts Young Lions	
DF	Sheikh Abdul Hadi	Courts Young Lions	
DF	Zulkhair Mustaffa	Promoted	
DF	(Serbia) Sadin Smajović	(Serbia) FK Javor Ivanjica	
MF	Shah Hirul	Geylang United	Free
MF	Jamil Ali	Tampines Rovers	Free
MF	Fazli Ayob	(Singapore) Home United	
MF	Gary Loo		
MF	Shah Zulkarnean		

==== Out ====
Position	Player	Transferred To	Ref
GK	Zakariah Nerani		
GK	Rizal Rahman		
DF	Yusiskandar Yusop	Hougang United	
DF	Krishnan Krishnan		
DF	Syarifuddin Suhaimi		
DF	(Croatia) Igor Cerina	(Malaysia) Sabah FA	
MF	Ridwan Jamil		
MF	Jonathan Xu	Eunos Crescent FC	
MF	Ignatius Ang	Warriors FC	
MF	Poh Yi Feng	Warriors FC	
MF	Fariz Faizal		
MF	Faizal Raffi		
MF	Noor Akid Nordin		
MF	Afiq Salman Tan		
MF	Khairuddin Omar		
MF	(Croatia) Tarik Čmajčanin	(Armenia) FC Mika	

=== Mid-season transfers ===
==== In ====
Position	Player	Transferred from	Ref
FW	(Croatia) Niko Tokić	(Croatia) NK Hrvatski Dragovoljac	Free

==== Out ====
Position	Player	Transferred To	Ref
FW	(Serbia) Robert Peričić		Retire

== Team statistics ==
=== Appearances and goals ===
Numbers in parentheses denote appearances as substitute.

No.	Pos.	Player	Sleague		Singapore Cup		League Cup		Total	
No.	Pos.	Player	Apps.	Goals	Apps.	Goals	Apps.	Goals	Apps.	Goals
Players who have played this season but had left the club or on loan to other club

== Competitions ==
=== S.League ===
Win Draw Loss

14 February 1	Garena Young Lions	1–0	Balestier Khalsa	Kallang, Singapore
19:30 UTC+08:00	Fareez 23'	Details		Stadium: Jalan Besar Stadium; Attendance: 2,246; Referee: Ahmad A'Qashah

27 February 2	Balestier Khalsa	1–1	Albirex Niigata (S)	Toa Payoh, Singapore
19:30 UTC+08:00	Jamil 55'	Details	Nurullah 31' (o.g.)	Stadium: Toa Payoh Stadium; Referee: Farhad Mohd

3 March 3	Geylang International	0–0	Balestier Khalsa	Bedok, Singapore
19:30 UTC+08:00		Details		Stadium: Bedok Stadium; Attendance: 1,811; Referee: Jansen Foo

11 March 4	Balestier Khalsa	1–1	Warriors	Kallang, Singapore
19:45 UTC+08:00	Fadli 90'	Details	Béhé 56'	Stadium: Jalan Besar Stadium; Referee: G. Letchman

19 March 5	Hougang United	1–0	Balestier Khalsa	Hougang, Singapore
19:30 UTC+08:00	Plazibat 83'	Details		Stadium: Hougang Stadium; Referee: Ahmad A'Qashah

3 April 6	Balestier Khalsa	0–1	Home United	Toa Payoh, Singapore
19:30 UTC+08:00		Details	Ilsø 34' (pen.)	Stadium: Toa Payoh Stadium; Referee: Sukhbir Singh

7 April 7	Tampines Rovers	1–0	Balestier Khalsa	Jurong West, Singapore
19:30 UTC+08:00	Webb 47'	Details		Stadium: Jurong West Stadium; Referee: Jansen Foo

15 April 8	Brunei DPMM	3–1	Balestier Khalsa	Bandar Seri Begawan, Brunei
20:15 UTC+08:00	Ramazotti 32'; Azwan A. 36'; Shahrazen 74'	Details	Hazzuwan 66'	Stadium: Hassanal Bolkiah National Stadium; Referee: G. Letchman

21 April 9	Balestier Khalsa	2–0	Garena Young Lions	Toa Payoh, Singapore
19:30 UTC+08:00	Krištić 4'; Fadli 38'	Details		Stadium: Toa Payoh Stadium; Referee: W. Ravisanthiran

6 May 10	Albirex Niigata (S)	6–0	Balestier Khalsa	Jurong East, Singapore
19:30 UTC+08:00	Shirota 8'; Kamata 29', 81'; Tanaka 54'; Inui 57'; Nagasaki 67'	Details		Stadium: Jurong East Stadium; Referee: Farhad Mohd

14 May 11	Balestier Khalsa	1–3	Geylang International	Toa Payoh, Singapore
19:30 UTC+08:00	Fadhil 21'	Details	Čubrilo 39', 76'; Delgado 66' (pen.)	Stadium: Toa Payoh Stadium; Referee: Sukhbir Singh

20 May 12	Warriors	1–1	Balestier Khalsa	Choa Chu Kang, Singapore
19:30 UTC+08:00	Béhé 19'	Details	Krištić 29'	Stadium: Choa Chu Kang Stadium; Referee: G. Letchman

10 June 13	Balestier Khalsa	2–2	Hougang United	Kallang, Singapore
20:00 UTC+08:00	Tokić 10'; Fazli 60'	Details	Kogure 86'; Plazibat 90'	Stadium: Jalan Besar Stadium; Referee: Nathan Chan

14 June 14	Home United	1–3	Balestier Khalsa	Bishan, Singapore
20:00 UTC+08:00	Faris 53'	Details	Zulkiffli 45'; Smajović 65'; Jamil 75'	Stadium: Bishan Stadium; Referee: Muhd Taqi

17 June 15	Balestier Khalsa	2–3	Tampines Rovers	Toa Payoh, Singapore
20:00 UTC+08:00	Krištić 64'; Fadli 90'	Details	Mehmet 6'; Fazrul 43', 74'	Stadium: Toa Payoh Stadium; Referee: Sukhbir Singh

24 June 16	Balestier Khalsa	1–4	Brunei DPMM	Kallang, Singapore
20:00 UTC+08:00	Lotinac 57' (pen.)	Details	Ramazotti 18', 30', 79'; Paulo Sérgio 50'	Stadium: Jalan Besar Stadium; Referee: Ahmad A'Qashah

5 August 17	Garena Young Lions	1–3	Balestier Khalsa	Kallang, Singapore
19:45 UTC+08:00	Swandi 87' (pen.)	Details	Tokić 9'; Krištić 18'; Kamis 25'	Stadium: Jalan Besar Stadium; Referee: Sukhbir Singh

19 August 18	Balestier Khalsa	0–1	Albirex Niigata (S)	Kallang, Singapore
19:45 UTC+08:00		Details	Kumada 14'	Stadium: Jalan Besar Stadium; Referee: Ahmad A'Qashah

25 August 19	Geylang International	2–1	Balestier Khalsa	Bedok, Singapore
19:30 UTC+08:00	Mark Hartmann 45'; Sahil Suhaimi 90'	Details	Niko Tokić 42' (pen.)	Stadium: Bedok Stadium; Referee: Nathan Chan

22 September 20	Balestier Khalsa	1–1	Warriors	Toa Payoh, Singapore
19:30 UTC+08:00	Syafiq 87'	Details	Béhé 45' (pen.)	Stadium: Toa Payoh Stadium; Referee: G. Letchman

1 October 21	Hougang United	1–1	Balestier Khalsa	Hougang, Singapore
19:30 UTC+08:00	Plazibat 8'	Details	Syafiq 70'	Stadium: Hougang Stadium; Referee: Farhad Mohd

15 October 22	Balestier Khalsa	0–5	Home United	Toa Payoh, Singapore
19:30 UTC+08:00		Details	Song 12'; Fandi 22', 45'; Jantan 30'; Ang 81'	Stadium: Toa Payoh Stadium; Referee: Ahmad A'Qashah

22 October 23	Tampines Rovers	2–0	Balestier Khalsa	Kallang, Singapore
19:30 UTC+08:00	Hamzah 39'; Mehmet 90+3'	Details		Stadium: Jalan Besar Stadium; Referee: Farhad Mohd

26 October 24	Balestier Khalsa	2–0	Brunei DPMM	Toa Payoh, Singapore
19:30 UTC+08:00	Tokić 67'; Krištić 90+5'	Details		Stadium: Toa Payoh Stadium; Referee: Sukhbir Singh

Pos	Team	Pld	W	D	L	GF	GA	GD	Pts
5	Geylang International	24	10	7	7	35	29	+6	37
6	Hougang United	24	9	5	10	35	39	−4	32
7	Warriors FC	24	7	7	10	39	39	0	28
8	Balestier Khalsa	24	4	7	13	23	42	−19	19
9	(Singapore) Young Lions (Note: The two foreign clubs – Albirex Niigata (S) and DPMM FC – as well as the Football Association of Singapore (FAS) under-21 team, Young Lions, are not eligible for any AFC competition spots.)	24	2	3	19	23	70	−47	9

Updated to match(es) played on 31 October 2016. Source: S.League
Rules for classification: 1) points; 2) goal difference; 3) number of goals scored; 4) number of wins

=== Singapore Cup ===
Win Draw Loss

27 June 2016	Balestier Khalsa	2–1	Home United	Toa Payoh Stadium, Singapore
20:00 UTC+8	Tokić 36'; Ahmad 86'	Details	Khairul 59'	Referee: W. Ravisanthiran

30 June 2016	Home United	2–2	Balestier Khalsa	Bishan Stadium, Singapore
20:00 UTC+8	Khairul 11'; Ilsø 55'	Details	Tokić 34', 59'	Referee: Jansen Foo

Balestier Khalsa won 4–3 on aggregate.

9 September 2016	Albirex Niigata (S) (Japan)	1–0	Balestier Khalsa	Jurong East Stadium, Singapore
19:30 UTC+8	Inaba 44'	Details		Referee: Jansen Foo

13 September 2016	Balestier Khalsa	0–1	(Japan) Albirex Niigata (S)	Toa Payoh Stadium, Singapore
19:30 UTC+8		Details	Kumada 82'	Referee: W Ravisanthiran

Albirex Niigata (S) won 2–0 on aggregate.

=== Group B ===
Pos	Team	Pld	W	D	L	GF	GA	GD	Pts	Qualification
1	Albirex Niigata (S)	3	2	0	1	4	1	+3	6	Advance to semi-final
2	Home United	3	1	1	1	7	4	+3	4	Advance to semi-final
3	Geylang International	3	1	1	1	3	7	−4	4	
4	Balestier Khalsa	3	0	2	1	4	6	−2	2	

Source: S.League

14 July 2016	Balestier Khalsa	2–2	Geylang International	Toa Payoh Stadium, Singapore
19:30 UTC+8	Tokić 9'; Fadhil 22'	Details	Hartmann 54', 90'	Referee: Ahmad A'Qashah

18 July 2016	Albirex Niigata (S) (Japan)	2–0	Balestier Khalsa	Jurong East Stadium, Singapore
19:30 UTC+8	Menda 45'; Jitozono 46'	Details		Referee: G. Letchman

22 July 2016	Balestier Khalsa	2–2	Home United	Jalan Besar Stadium, Singapore
19:45 UTC+8	Niko Tokić 27'; Jamil Ali 54'	Details	Song Ui-young 30'; Hanafi Salleh 85' (o.g.)	Referee: W Ravisanthiran
