= 2014 Warriors FC season =

Warriors
2014 season
- Chairman: Philip Lam Tin Sing
- Head coach: Alex Weaver
- Stadium: Choa Chu Kang Stadium

The 2014 season was Warriors' 19th consecutive season in the top flight of Singapore football and in the S.League. Along with the S.League, the club also competed in the Prime League, the Singapore Cup and the Singapore League Cup.

== Squad ==
=== S.League squad ===
Squad No.	Name	Nationality	Date of birth (age)	Previous club
Goalkeepers
1	Shahul Rayyan	(Singapore)	12 February 1995 (age 31)	(Singapore) Young Lions FC
13	Daniel Ong	(Singapore)	31 January 1989 (age 37)	(Singapore) Home United
40	Nur Amin	(Singapore)	5 June 1995 (age 30)	Youth Team
Defenders
2	Marus Wheeler	(Singapore)	27 December 1994 (age 31)	(Singapore) Tanjong Pagar United
3	Marin Vidošević	(Singapore)	9 October 1986 (age 39)	(Croatia) NK Imotski
4	Syaqir Sulaiman	(Singapore)	12 August 1986 (age 39)	(Singapore) Hougang United
5	Kento Fukuda	(Japan)	15 May 1990 (age 35)	(Singapore) Geylang International
16	Daniel Bennett	(Singapore) (England)	7 January 1978 (age 48)	(Singapore) Woodlands Wellington
18	Nur Aysidiq	(Singapore)	1 September 1983 (age 42)	(Singapore) Balestier Khalsa
19	Irwan Shah	(Singapore)	2 November 1988 (age 37)	(Singapore) LionsXII
20	Hamqaamal Shah	(Singapore)	5 September 1986 (age 39)	(Singapore) Gombak United
Midfielders
5	Azlan Razak	(Singapore)	6 September 1993 (age 32)	Youth Team
6	Thomas Beattie	(Singapore)	16 September 1986 (age 39)	(Singapore) Hougang United
7	Shi Jiayi	(Singapore) (China)	2 September 1983 (age 42)	(Singapore) Home United
8	Emmeric Ong	(Singapore)	25 January 1991 (age 35)	(Singapore) LionsXII
11	Fazli Jaffar	(Singapore)	5 September 1983 (age 42)	(Singapore) Hougang United
12	Hafsyar Farkhan	(Singapore)	16 April 1988 (age 37)	Youth Team
14	Kevin McCann	(Scotland)	11 September 1987 (age 38)	(Scotland) Raith Rovers F.C.
17	Andy Ahmad	(Singapore)	5 April 1991 (age 34)	(Singapore) Woodlands Wellington
21	Hafiz Rahim	(Singapore)	19 November 1983 (age 42)	(Singapore) Home United
25	Karlo Ivancic	(Singapore)	24 July 1994 (age 31)	(Croatia) NK Bistra
35	Fatemy Firdouse	(Singapore)	29 June 1995 (age 30)	Youth Team
Strikers
9	Miroslav Pejić	(Croatia)	16 February 1986 (age 40)	(Croatia) NK Samobor
10	Nicolás Vélez	(Argentina)	4 July 1990 (age 35)	(Spain) Atlético Sanluqueño CF
15	Fazrul Nawaz	(Singapore)	17 April 1985 (age 40)	(Malaysia) Sabah FA
33	Hazim Faiz	(Singapore)	28 September 1995 (age 30)	Youth Team
Players leaving during the season
1	Neezam Aziz	(Singapore)	25 April 1991 (age 34)	Youth team

== Coaching staff ==
Position	Name	Ref.
Head coach	(Singapore) Razif Onn	
Assistant coach	(Singapore) Muhammad Effendi Bin Rahmat	
Assistant coach / Goalkeeping Coach	(Singapore) Lee Bee Seng	
Team manager	(Singapore) Eugene Cheang	
Fitness trainer	(Singapore) Silas Abdul Karim Bin Noor Shah	
Sports trainer	(Singapore) Benjamin Bhagawat	

== Transfers ==
=== Pre-season transfers ===
==== In ====
Position	Player	Transferred From	Ref
GK	(Singapore) Shahul Rayyan	(Singapore) Young Lions FC	
GK	(Singapore) Daniel Ong	(Singapore) Warriors FC	
DF	(Singapore) Syaqir Sulaiman	(Singapore) Warriors FC	
MF	(Singapore) Fazli Jaffar	(Singapore) Hougang United	
MF	(Singapore) Hamqaamal Shah	(Singapore) Geylang International	
MF	(Croatia) Karlo Ivancic	(Croatia) NK Bistra	
FW	(Singapore) Fazrul Nawaz	(Malaysia) Sabah FA	

==== Out ====
Position	Player	Transferred To	Ref
GK	(Singapore) Hyrulnizam Juma'at	(Singapore) Tampines Rovers	
GK	(Singapore) Zainol Gulam		
DF	(Singapore) Syaiful Iskandar		
DF	(Singapore) Abdil Qaiyyim Mutalib	(Singapore) Tampines Rovers	
DF	(Singapore) Syed Fadhil		
MF	(Japan) Kazuyuki Toda		
MF	(Japan) Tatsuro Inui	(Japan) SC Sagamihara	
MF	(Japan) Shimpei Sakurada	(Myanmar) Yadanarbon F.C.	
MF	(Singapore) Ruzaini Zainal	(Singapore) Tampines Rovers	
MF	(Singapore) Matthew Abaraham	(Singapore) Tampines Rovers	
MF	(Singapore) Shukor Zailan		
FW	(Bosnia and Herzegovina) Mislav Karoglan	(Croatia) NK Imotski	

== Team statistics ==
=== Appearances and goals ===
Numbers in parentheses denote appearances as substitute.

No.	Pos.	Player	Sleague		Singapore Cup		League Cup		Total	
No.	Pos.	Player	Apps.	Goals	Apps.	Goals	Apps.	Goals	Apps.	Goals
1	GK	(Singapore) Hassan Sunny	25	0	0	0	0	0	25	0
2	DF	(Singapore) Jeremy Chiang	10	0	0	0	0	0	10	0
3	DF	(Singapore) Zulfadli Zainal Abidin	22(2)	0	0	0	0	0	24	0
4	DF	(Singapore) Ismail Yunos	8	0	0	0	0	0	8	0
6	MF	(England) Thomas Beattie	17	1	0	0	0	0	17	1
7	MF	(Singapore) (China) Shi Jiayi	19(3)	3	0	0	0	0	22	3
8	MF	(Singapore) Dharham Aziz	12	0	0	0	0	0	12	0
9	FW	(Croatia) Miroslav Pejić	22(1)	12	0	0	0	0	23	12
10	FW	(Argentina) Nicolás Vélez	26	21	0	0	0	0	26	21
11	DF	(Croatia) Marin Vidošević	23(1)	2	0	0	0	0	24	2
12	MF	(Singapore) Hafsyar Farkhan	2(19)	0	0	0	0	0	21	0
13	FW	(Singapore) Zulfadhli Emran	1(5)	0	0	0	0	0	6	0
14	MF	(Scotland) Kevin McCann	26	2	0	0	0	0	26	2
16	DF	(Singapore) (England) Daniel Bennett	27	0	0	0	0	0	27	0
17	MF	(Singapore) Nurhazwan Norasikin	0(1)	0	0	0	0	0	1	0
18	GK	(Singapore) Neezam Aziz	2(1)	0	0	0	0	0	3	0
19	DF	(Singapore) Irwan Shah	23(3)	2	0	0	0	0	26	2
20	MF	(Singapore) Chang Guo Guang	0(3)	0	0	0	0	0	3	0
21	FW	(Singapore) Hafiz Rahim	26	7	0	0	0	0	26	7
22	FW	(Singapore) (Nigeria) Agu Casmir	4(6)	2	0	0	0	0	10	2
24	DF	(Singapore) Nur Aysidiq	0(2)	0	0	0	0	0	2	0
25	FW	(Singapore) Basit Mansoor	0(1)	0	0	0	0	0	1	0
28	MF	(Singapore) Amin Rossady	1(3)	0	0	0	0	0	2	0
32	MF	(Singapore) Suria Prakash	6(10)	0	0	0	0	0	16	0
Players who have played this season but had left the club or on loan to other club

== Competitions ==
=== S.League ===
Win Draw Loss

Pos	Team	Pld	W	D	L	GF	GA	GD	Pts	Qualification
1	Warriors FC	27	16	5	6	53	35	+18	53	Qualification to AFC Champions League Qualifying Round 1 or AFC Cup Group Stage
2	(Brunei) DPMM FC (Note: The three foreign clubs – Albirex Niigata (S), DPMM FC and Harimau Muda B – as well as the Football Association of Singapore (FAS) under-23 team, Young Lions, are not eligible for any AFC competition spots.)	27	15	5	7	63	30	+33	50	
3	Tampines Rovers	27	14	7	6	44	32	+12	49	
4	Home United	27	13	5	9	52	41	+11	44	
5	(Japan) Albirex Niigata (S)	27	13	5	9	51	40	+11	44	

Source: RSSSF
Rules for classification: 1) points; 2) goal difference; 3) number of goals scored

=== Singapore Cup ===
Win Draw Loss

27 May 2014	Warriors FC	1–3	Balestier Khalsa	Choa Chu Kang Stadium, Choa Chu Kang
19:30	Pejić 30'	Report	Zulkiffli 6'; Ljubojević 62'; Park 77'	Attendance: 1,166; Referee: Jansen Foo (SIN)

=== Singapore TNP League Cup ===
==== Group matches ====
Win Draw Loss

12 July 2014	Tampines Rovers	2–3	Warriors FC	Clementi Stadium
20:00	Butler 8'; Fahrudin 23'	Report	Agu 12', 46', 51'	Referee: Farhad Mohd (SIN)

15 July 2014	Warriors FC	0–4	Geylang International	Choa Chu Kang Stadium
20:00		Report	Schneider 49'; Fuad 86'; Hafiz 90'; Neezam 86' (o.g.)	Referee: Jansen Foo (SIN)

==== Quarter-final ====
18 July 2014	Tanjong Pagar United	1–0 (a.e.t.)	Warriors FC	Queenstown Stadium
20:00	Firdaus 116'	Report		Referee: Sukhbir Singh (SIN)
