= 2015 Singapore Charity Shield =

Warriors	Balestier Khalsa
1	0
- Date: 1 March 2015
- Venue: Jalan Besar Stadium, Singapore
- Referee: Ahmad A'Qashah (SIN)
- Attendance: 2,700

The 2015 Singapore Charity Shield (also known as the Great Eastern SG50 Charity Shield for sponsorship reasons as well as to commemorate Singapore's 50th year of independence) was the 8th edition of the Singapore Charity Shield held on 1 March 2015 at Jalan Besar Stadium, between the winners of the previous season's S.League and Singapore Cup competitions. The match was contested by 2014 S.League champions Warriors and 2014 Singapore Cup winners Balestier Khalsa.

Warriors won the Shield for the second time after defeating Balestier Khalsa 1–0, with Nicolás Vélez netting the only goal.

== Match ==
=== Details ===
1 March 2015
19:30 SST

Warriors FC	1–0	Balestier Khalsa
Vélez 28'	Details

Jalan Besar Stadium, Singapore
Attendance: 2,700
Referee: Ahmad A'Qashah (SIN)

GK	1	(Singapore) Neezam Aziz
DF	3	(Croatia) Marin Vidošević
DF	4	(Singapore) Syaqir Sulaiman		(substituted off) 77'
DF	16	(Singapore) Daniel Bennett (c)
DF	19	(Singapore) Irwan Shah
MF	6	(England) Thomas Beattie	(yellow card) 86'
MF	14	(Scotland) Kevin McCann	(yellow card) 19'
MF	9	(Croatia) Miroslav Pejić
MF	21	(Singapore) Hafiz Rahim		(substituted off) 66'
FW	11	(Singapore) Fazli Jaffar		(substituted off) 66'
FW	10	(Argentina) Nicolás Vélez
Substitutes:
GK	13	(Singapore) Daniel Ong
DF	18	(Singapore) Nur Asyidiq Sukarto		(substituted on) 77'
DF	20	(Singapore) Hamqaamal Shah
MF	5	(Singapore) Azlan Abdul Razak
MF	7	(Singapore) Shi Jiayi		(substituted on) 66'
MF	12	(Singapore) Hafsyar Farkhan
MF	17	(Singapore) Andy Ahmad		(substituted on) 66'
Head coach:
(England) Alex Weaver

GK	19	(Singapore) Zaiful Nizam (c)
DF	2	(Singapore) Yusiskandar Yusop		(substituted off) 59'
DF	5	(Croatia) Igor Čerina
DF	6	(Singapore) Nurullah Hussein	(yellow card) 75'
DF	20	(Singapore) Ho Wai Loon
DF	13	(Singapore) Jonathan Xu
MF	4	(Serbia) Emir Lotinac
MF	17	(Singapore) Poh Yi Feng	(yellow card) 30'	(substituted off) 64'
MF	10	(Serbia) Tarik Čmajčanin
FW	11	(Croatia) Miroslav Krištić
FW	9	(Croatia) Robert Peričić		(substituted off) 75'
Substitutes:
GK	1	(Singapore) Zakariah Nerani
DF	3	(Singapore) Hanafi Salleh
MF	7	(Singapore) Zulkiffli Hassim		(substituted on) 59'
MF	14	(Singapore) Ignatius Ang		(substituted on) 75'
MF	15	(Singapore) Fadhil Noh
MF	18	(Singapore) Ahmad Syahir
FW	36	(Singapore) Noor Akid		(substituted on) 64'
Head coach:
(Croatia) Marko Kraljević

Match officials

- Referee: Ahmad A'Qashah (SIN)
- Assistant referees:
  - Edwin Lee (SIN)
  - Manoj Kalwani (SIN)
- Fourth official: W. Ravisanthiran (SIN)
- Match commissioner: Mohd Izmil (SIN)

Match rules

- 90 minutes.
- Penalty shoot-out if scores level after 90 minutes.
- Maximum of seven-named substitutes.
- Maximum of three substitutions.

== See also ==
- 2015 S.League
- 2015 Singapore Cup
- 2015 Singapore League Cup
