= 2016 S.League =

21st season of the S.League

S.League
- Season: 2016
- Champions: (Japan) Albirex Niigata (S) (1st title)
- Community Shield: (Japan) Albirex Niigata (S)
- AFC Champions League: Tampines Rovers (S.League runner-up)
- AFC Cup: Home United (S.League 4th)
- Matches: 72
- Goals: 352 (4.89 per match)
- Top goalscorer: (Brazil) Rafael Ramazotti (20 goals)
- Biggest home win: (Japan) Albirex Niigata (S) 6–0 Balestier Khalsa (6 May 2016)
- Biggest away win: (Singapore) Young Lions 0–5 (Japan) Albirex Niigata (S) (20 February 2016)
- Highest scoring: (Brunei) DPMM FC 5–3 Young Lions (26 September 2016)
- Longest winning run: 10 matches (Japan) Albirex Niigata (S)
- Longest unbeaten run: 10 matches (Japan) Albirex Niigata (S)
- Longest winless run: 10 matches (Singapore) Young Lions
- Longest losing run: 10 matches (Singapore) Young Lions
- All statistics correct as of 31 October 2016.

The 2016 S.League (also known as the Great Eastern Yeo's S.League for sponsorship reasons) was the 21st season of the S.League, the top-flight Singaporean professional league for association football clubs, since its establishment in 1996. The season began on 13 February 2016, and concluded on 28 October 2016. DPMM FC were the defending champions.

== Teams ==
A total of 9 teams competed in the league. Albirex Niigata (S) and DPMM FC were invited foreign clubs from Japan and Brunei respectively.

=== Stadiums and locations ===
Location of 2016 S.League teams
Locations of the 2016 S.League teams from Singapore

Team	Stadium	Capacity
(Japan) Albirex Niigata (S)	Jurong East Stadium	2,700
Balestier Khalsa	Toa Payoh Stadium	3,896
(Brunei) DPMM FC	Hassanal Bolkiah National Stadium	28,000
Geylang International	Bedok Stadium	3,864
Home United	Bishan Stadium	6,254
Hougang United	Hougang Stadium	3,400
Tampines Rovers	Jurong West Stadium	4,200
Warriors FC	Choa Chu Kang Stadium	4,268
(Singapore) Young Lions	Jalan Besar Stadium	8,000

=== Personnel and sponsoring ===
Note: Flags indicate national team as has been defined under FIFA eligibility rules. Players may hold more than one non-FIFA nationality.

Team	Head coach	Captain	Kit manufacturer	Shirt sponsor
(Japan) Albirex Niigata (S)	(Japan) Naoki Naruo	(Japan) Yōsuke Nozawa	Hummel	Canon
Balestier Khalsa	(Croatia) Marko Kraljević	Zaiful Nizam	Umbro	Civic
(Brunei) DPMM FC	(Scotland) Steve Kean	(Brunei) Rosmin Muhammad Kamis	Lotto	–
Geylang International	Hasrin Jailani	Isa Halim	THORB	Epson
Home United	Aidil Sharin	Juma'at Jantan	Puma	AVEC
Hougang United	K. Balagumaran	Jozef Kapláň	Vonda	ESW
Tampines Rovers	Akbar Nawas	Mustafić Fahrudin	Kipsta	Hyundai
Warriors FC	Razif Onn	Zulfadli Zainal Abidin	Joma	Warriors
(Singapore) Young Lions	(France) Patrick Hesse	Khairul Amri	Nike	Shopee

=== Managerial changes ===
Team	Outgoing manager	Manner of departure	Date of vacancy	Position in table	Incoming manager	Date of appointment
(Japan) Albirex Niigata (S)	(Japan) Tatsuyuki Okuyama	End of contract	30 November 2015	Pre-season	(Japan) Naoki Naruo	18 December 2015
Geylang International	(Germany) Jorg Steinebrunner	End of contract	2 December 2015	Pre-season	Hasrin Jailani	15 December 2015
(Singapore) Young Lions	(Germany) Jürgen Raab	End of contract	31 December 2015	Pre-season	(France) Richard Tardy	1 January 2016
Warriors FC	(Morocco) Karim Bencherifa	Mutual consent	6 January 2016	Pre-season	(Germany) Jorg Steinebrunner	6 January 2016
(Singapore) Young Lions	(France) Richard Tardy	End of caretaker spell	15 February 2016	2nd	(France) Patrick Hesse	15 February 2016
Warriors FC	(Germany) Jorg Steinbrunner	Resigned	14 May 2016	7th	Razif Onn	14 May 2016
Tampines Rovers	V. Sundramoorthy	Appointed head coach of Singapore	27 May 2016	2nd	Akbar Nawas	27 May 2016
Home United	Philippe Aw	Redesignated	30 July 2016	4th	Aidil Sharin	4 August 2016

=== Foreigners ===
Players name in bold indicates the player is registered during the mid-season transfer window.

Club	Player 1	Player 2	Player 3	Prime League	Former
Balestier Khalsa	(Serbia) Emir Lotinac	(Croatia) Miroslav Kristic	**(Croatia) Niko Tokić**	(Serbia) Sadin Smajović	(Croatia) Robert Peričić
(Brunei) DPMM FC	(Northern Ireland) Brian McLean	(Brazil) Rafael Ramazotti	(Portugal) Paulo Sérgio	-	-
Geylang International	(Japan) Yuki Ichikawa	(Argentina) Carlos Alberto Delgado	**(Philippines) Mark Hartmann**	**(Spain) Roberto Camarasa**	(Croatia) Branko Čubrilo
Home United	(South Korea) Song Ui-young	(France) Sirina Camara	(Denmark) Ken Ilsø	(France) Ambroise Begue	-
Hougang United	(Japan) Fumiya Kogure	(Slovakia) Jozef Kapláň	(Croatia) Stipe Plazibat	(England) Luke Allen	-
Tampines Rovers	(Canada) Jordan Webb	(Republic of Ireland) Billy Mehmet	(England) Jermaine Pennant	**(United States) Diego Silvas**	-
Warriors FC	(Japan) Kento Fukuda	(Croatia) Nikola Rak	(France) Jonathan Béhé	(Croatia) Marijan Šuto	-
(Singapore) Young Lions	-	-	-	-	(France) Benjamin Bertrand

- Albirex Niigata (S) is an all-Japanese team and do not hire any foreigners.

== League table ==
Pos	Team	Pld	W	D	L	GF	GA	GD	Pts	Qualification
1	(Japan) Albirex Niigata (S) (Note: The two foreign clubs – Albirex Niigata (S) and DPMM FC – as well as the Football Association of Singapore (FAS) under-21 team, Young Lions, are not eligible for any AFC competition spots.)	24	16	2	6	50	24	+26	50	
2	Tampines Rovers	24	15	4	5	50	28	+22	49	Qualification to AFC Champions League Preliminary Round 1 or AFC Cup Group Stage
3	(Brunei) DPMM FC	24	12	5	7	47	37	+10	41	
4	Home United	24	11	4	9	50	42	+8	37	Qualification to AFC Cup Play-off Round
5	Geylang International	24	10	7	7	35	29	+6	37	
6	Hougang United	24	9	5	10	35	39	−4	32	
7	Warriors FC	24	7	7	10	39	39	0	28	
8	Balestier Khalsa	24	4	7	13	23	42	−19	19	
9	(Singapore) Young Lions	24	2	3	19	23	70	−47	9	

Updated to match(es) played on 31 October 2016. Source: S.League
Rules for classification: 1) points; 2) goal difference; 3) number of goals scored; 4) number of wins

== Results ==
=== Matchday 1 ===
13 February	Albirex Niigata (S)	3 – 2	DPMM FC	Kallang, Singapore
19:45 UTC+08:00	Yamada 16'; Kamata 36'; Fujihara 59'	Details	Azwan A. 65'; Tanaka 90+2' (o.g.)	Stadium: Jalan Besar Stadium; Attendance: 2,481; Referee: Jansen Foo

14 February	Garena Young Lions	1 – 0	Balestier Khalsa	Kallang, Singapore
19:30 UTC+08:00	Fareez 23'	Details		Stadium: Jalan Besar Stadium; Attendance: 2,246; Referee: Ahmad A'Qashah

14 February	Home United	2 – 2	Warriors FC	Bishan, Singapore
19:30 UTC+08:00	Khairul 17'; Camara 82'	Details	Béhé 35' (pen.); Fazli 90+1'	Stadium: Bishan Stadium; Attendance: 1,756; Referee: Farhad Mohd

15 February	Tampines Rovers	3 – 3	Geylang International	Jurong West, Singapore
19:30 UTC+08:00	Webb 13'; Mehmet 34'; Yasir 86'	Details	Amy 35'; Delgado 55'; Ng 78'	Stadium: Jurong West Stadium; Attendance: 2,930; Referee: Sukhbir Singh

=== Matchday 2 ===
18 February	Hougang United	1 – 0	Home United	Hougang, Singapore
19:30 UTC+08:00	Plazibat 34'	Details		Stadium: Hougang Stadium; Attendance: 2,307; Referee: Jansen Foo

20 February	Garena Young Lions	0 – 5	Albirex Niigata (S)	Kallang, Singapore
19:30 UTC+08:00		Details	Kawata 8', 56', 65', 75'; Jitozono 71' (pen.)	Stadium: Jalan Besar Stadium; Attendance: 2,371; Referee: G. Letchman

20 February	Geylang International	1 – 1	DPMM FC	Bedok, Singapore
19:30 UTC+08:00	Sahil 76'	Details	Ramazotti 77'	Stadium: Bedok Stadium; Referee: Muhd Taqi

=== Matchday 3 ===
25 February	Garena Young Lions	0 – 2	Geylang International	Kallang, Singapore
19:30 UTC+08:00		Details	Čubrilo 14'; Faritz 66'	Stadium: Jalan Besar Stadium; Attendance: 2,416; Referee: Nathan Chan

26 February	Tampines Rovers	4 – 1	Hougang United	Jurong West, Singapore
19:45 UTC+08:00	Shahdan 8'; Ismadi 11'; Pennant 20'; Fazrul 84'	Details	Plazibat 26'	Stadium: Jurong West Stadium; Attendance: 2,106; Referee: Ahmad A'Qashah

27 February	Balestier Khalsa	1 – 1	Albirex Niigata (S)	Toa Payoh, Singapore
19:30 UTC+08:00	Jamil 55'	Details	Nurullah 31' (o.g.)	Stadium: Toa Payoh Stadium; Referee: Farhad Mohd

27 February	DPMM FC	3 – 1	Warriors FC	Bandar Seri Begawan, Brunei
20:15 UTC+08:00	McLean 7'; Maududi 26'; Azwan S. 28'	Details	Béhé 47'	Stadium: Hassanal Bolkiah National Stadium; Referee: Sukhbir Singh

=== Matchday 4 ===
3 March	Home United	1 – 1	Tampines Rovers	Bishan, Singapore
19:30 UTC+08:00	Ilsø 25'	Details	Pennant 40'	Stadium: Bishan Stadium; Attendance: 3,551; Referee: Muhd Taqi

3 March	Geylang International	0 – 0	Balestier Khalsa	Bedok, Singapore
19:30 UTC+08:00		Details		Stadium: Bedok Stadium; Attendance: 1,811; Referee: Jansen Foo

4 March	Warriors FC	2 – 0	Garena Young Lions	Choa Chu Kang, Singapore
19:30 UTC+08:00	Hafiz R. 44'; Béhé 90'	Details		Stadium: Choa Chu Kang Stadium; Referee: Ahmad A'Qashah

4 March	Hougang United	0 – 0	DPMM FC	Kallang, Singapore
19:45 UTC+08:00		Details		Stadium: Jalan Besar Stadium; Referee: Nathan Chan

=== Matchday 5 ===
10 March	Garena Young Lions	1 – 3	Hougang United	Kallang, Singapore
19:30 UTC+08:00	Fareez 80'	Details	Plazibat 4', 82'; Taufiq 52' (o.g.)	Stadium: Jalan Besar Stadium; Referee: Farhad Mohd

10 March	Geylang International	0 – 0	Albirex Niigata (S)	Bedok, Singapore
19:30 UTC+08:00		Details		Stadium: Bedok Stadium; Attendance: 2,139; Referee: Sukhbir Singh

11 March	Balestier Khalsa	1 – 1	Warriors FC	Kallang, Singapore
19:45 UTC+08:00	Fadli 90'	Details	Béhé 56'	Stadium: Jalan Besar Stadium; Referee: G. Letchman

11 March	DPMM FC	2 – 1	Home United	Bandar Seri Begawan, Brunei
20:15 UTC+08:00	Ramazotti 35' (pen.); Azwan A. 72'	Details	Begue 19'	Stadium: Hassanal Bolkiah National Stadium; Referee: W. Ravisanthiran

=== Matchday 6 ===
17 March	Home United	4 – 1	Garena Young Lions	Bishan, Singapore
19:30 UTC+08:00	Ilsø 18'; Zulfahmi 31'; Khairul 50', 83'	Details	Fareez 11'	Stadium: Bishan Stadium; Attendance: 2,048; Referee: Jansen Foo

18 March	Warriors FC	2 – 0	Albirex Niigata (S)	Kallang, Singapore
19:45 UTC+08:00	Syaqir 48'; Béhé 79'	Details		Stadium: Jalan Besar Stadium; Referee: Nathan Chan

19 March	Hougang United	1 – 0	Balestier Khalsa	Hougang, Singapore
19:30 UTC+08:00	Plazibat 83'	Details		Stadium: Hougang Stadium; Referee: Ahmad A'Qashah

19 March	DPMM FC	1 – 2	Tampines Rovers	Bandar Seri Begawan, Brunei
20:15 UTC+08:00	Ramazotti 59'	Details	Mehmet 4'; Webb 15'	Stadium: Hassanal Bolkiah National Stadium; Referee: Farhad Mohd

=== Matchday 7 ===
1 April	Geylang International	2 – 2	Warriors FC	Kallang, Singapore
19:45 UTC+08:00	Quak 51'; Delgado 86'	Details	Béhé 16'; Ridhuan 89'	Stadium: Jalan Besar Stadium; Attendance: 1,854; Referee: Farhad Mohd

2 April	Albirex Niigata (S)	2 – 0	Hougang United	Jurong East, Singapore
19:30 UTC+08:00	Shirota 49'; Inui 86'	Details		Stadium: Jurong East Stadium; Attendance: 2,384; Referee: Muhd Taqi

3 April	Balestier Khalsa	0 – 1	Home United	Toa Payoh, Singapore
19:30 UTC+08:00		Details	Ilsø 34' (pen.)	Stadium: Toa Payoh Stadium; Referee: Sukhbir Singh

3 April	Garena Young Lions	1 – 2	Tampines Rovers	Kallang, Singapore
19:30 UTC+08:00	Fareez 62' (pen.)	Details	Shakir 45' van Huizen 50'	Stadium: Jalan Besar Stadium; Attendance: 2,200; Referee: W. Ravisanthiran

=== Matchday 8 ===
7 April	Tampines Rovers	1 – 0	Balestier Khalsa	Jurong West, Singapore
19:30 UTC+08:00	Webb 47'	Details		Stadium: Jurong West Stadium; Referee: Jansen Foo

7 April	Hougang United	3 – 1	Geylang International	Hougang, Singapore
19:30 UTC+08:00	Plazibat 54' (pen.); Faiz 60'; Raihan 88'	Details	Delgado 15'	Stadium: Hougang Stadium; Attendance: 1,537; Referee: Sukhbir Singh

8 April	Home United	0 – 3	Albirex Niigata (S)	Kallang, Singapore
19:45 UTC+08:00		Details	Kawata 47', 71', 89'	Stadium: Jalan Besar Stadium; Referee: Farhad Mohd

8 April	DPMM FC	4 – 1	Garena Young Lions	Bandar Seri Begawan, Brunei
20:15 UTC+08:00	Maududi 4'; Ramazotti 50', 82' (pen.); Ammirul 58' (o.g.)	Details	Fareez 45'	Stadium: Hassanal Bolkiah National Stadium; Referee: Nathan Chan

=== Matchday 9 ===
14 April	Warriors FC	0 – 1	Hougang United	Choa Chu Kang, Singapore
19:30 UTC+08:00		Details	Kogure 18'	Stadium: Choa Chu Kang Stadium; Referee: W. Ravisanthiran

15 April	Geylang International	2 – 2	Home United	Kallang, Singapore
19:45 UTC+08:00	Ng 24'; Amy 46'	Details	Ilsø 15'; Al-Qaasimy 39' (o.g.)	Stadium: Jalan Besar Stadium; Attendance: 2,035; Referee: Jansen Foo

15 April	DPMM FC	3 – 1	Balestier Khalsa	Bandar Seri Begawan, Brunei
20:15 UTC+08:00	Ramazotti 32'; Azwan A. 36'; Shahrazen 74'	Details	Hazzuwan 66'	Stadium: Hassanal Bolkiah National Stadium; Referee: G. Letchman

16 April	Albirex Niigata (S)	1 – 0	Tampines Rovers	Jurong East, Singapore
19:30 UTC+08:00	Inui 71' (pen.)	Details		Stadium: Jurong East Stadium; Attendance: 2,550; Referee: Ahmad A'Qashah

=== Matchday 10 ===
21 April	Geylang International	0 – 1	Tampines Rovers	Bedok, Singapore
19:30 UTC+08:00		Details	Yasir 28'	Stadium: Bedok Stadium; Attendance: 2,369; Referee: G. Letchman

21 April	Balestier Khalsa	2 – 0	Garena Young Lions	Toa Payoh, Singapore
19:30 UTC+08:00	Krištić 4'; Fadli 38'	Details		Stadium: Toa Payoh Stadium; Referee: W. Ravisanthiran

22 April	Warriors FC	1 – 2	Home United	Kallang, Singapore
19:45 UTC+08:00	Béhé 63'	Details	Song 20'; Ilsø 85'	Stadium: Jalan Besar Stadium; Attendance: 2,308; Referee: Nathan Chan

22 April	DPMM FC	1 – 2	Albirex Niigata (S)	Bandar Seri Begawan, Brunei
20:15 UTC+08:00	Azwan A. 57'	Details	Kawata 72', 87' (pen.)	Stadium: Hassanal Bolkiah National Stadium; Referee: Muhd Taqi

=== Matchday 11 ===
28 April	Albirex Niigata (S)	3 – 0	Garena Young Lions	Jurong East, Singapore
19:30 UTC+08:00	Inui 15'; Kawata 28'; Nagasaki 78'	Details		Stadium: Jurong East Stadium; Referee: Sukhbir Singh

29 April	Home United	3 – 2	Hougang United	Kallang, Singapore
19:45 UTC+08:00	Ilsø 16'; Song 28'; Faris 78'	Details	Plazibat 41' (pen.); Raihan 86'	Stadium: Jalan Besar Stadium; Referee: Muhd Taqi

30 April	Tampines Rovers	4 – 2	Warriors FC	Jurong West, Singapore
19:30 UTC+08:00	Mehmet 38'; Pennant 54' (pen.); Hafiz 75', 87'	Details	Hafiz N. 41'; Ridhuan 45'	Stadium: Jurong West Stadium; Attendance: 1,756; Referee: Farhad Mohd

30 April	DPMM FC	1 – 2	Geylang International	Bandar Seri Begawan, Brunei
20:15 UTC+08:00	Ramazotti 66' (pen.)	Details	Shawal 30'; Faritz 87'	Stadium: Hassanal Bolkiah National Stadium; Referee: Ahmad A'Qashah

=== Matchday 12 ===
4 May	Hougang United	1 – 1	Tampines Rovers	Hougang, Singapore
19:30 UTC+08:00	Iqbal 70'	Details	Mehmet 41' (pen.)	Stadium: Hougang Stadium; Attendance: 1,538; Referee: Ahmad A'Qashah

5 May	Geylang International	3 – 1	Garena Young Lions	Bedok, Singapore
19:30 UTC+08:00	Delgado 3' (pen.); Ichikawa 74'; Quak 88'	Details	Fareez 52' (pen.)	Stadium: Bedok Stadium; Attendance: 1,331; Referee: G. Letchman

5 May	Warriors FC	1 – 1	DPMM FC	Choa Chu Kang, Singapore
19:30 UTC+08:00	Suto 89'	Details	Paulo Sérgio 61'	Stadium: Choa Chu Kang Stadium; Referee: W. Ravisanthiran

6 May	Albirex Niigata (S)	6 – 0	Balestier Khalsa	Jurong East, Singapore
19:30 UTC+08:00	Shirota 8'; Kamata 29', 81'; Tanaka 54'; Inui 57'; Nagasaki 67'	Details		Stadium: Jurong East Stadium; Referee: Farhad Mohd

=== Matchday 13 ===
12 May	Garena Young Lions	3 – 1	Warriors FC	Kallang, Singapore
19:30 UTC+08:00	Hami 5'; Hazim 16'; Khairul 50'	Details	Béhé 85'	Stadium: Jalan Besar Stadium; Attendance: 1,609; Referee: Nathan Chan

13 May	Tampines Rovers	1 – 2	Home United	Kallang, Singapore
19:45 UTC+08:00	Fazrul 22'	Details	Azhar 24'; Ilsø 70'	Stadium: Jalan Besar Stadium; Attendance: 2,099; Referee: Farhad Mohd

14 May	Balestier Khalsa	1 – 3	Geylang International	Toa Payoh, Singapore
19:30 UTC+08:00	Fadhil 21'	Details	Čubrilo 39', 76'; Delgado 66' (pen.)	Stadium: Toa Payoh Stadium; Referee: Sukhbir Singh

14 May	DPMM FC	3 – 2	Hougang United	Bandar Seri Begawan, Brunei
20:15 UTC+08:00	Paulo Sérgio 10'; Azwan A. 26'; Shahrazen 82'	Details	Plazibat 55'; Kapláň 59'	Stadium: Hassanal Bolkiah National Stadium; Referee: Jansen Foo

Mid-week

17 May^{A}	Warriors FC	0 – 0	Tampines Rovers	Choa Chu Kang, Singapore
19:30 UTC+08:00		Details		Stadium: Choa Chu Kang Stadium; Referee: Jansen Foo

=== Matchday 14 ===
19 May	Hougang United	1 – 1	Garena Young Lions	Hougang, Singapore
19:30 UTC+08:00	Nurhilmi 18'	Details	Fareez 14' (pen.)	Stadium: Hougang Stadium; Referee: Sukhbir Singh

19 May	Home United	5 – 0	DPMM FC	Bishan, Singapore
19:30 UTC+08:00	Azhar 10'; Faris 39'; Ilsø 71', 73'; Syahiran 85'	Details		Stadium: Bishan Stadium; Attendance: 1,900; Referee: Muhd Taqi

20 May	Warriors FC	1 – 1	Balestier Khalsa	Choa Chu Kang, Singapore
19:30 UTC+08:00	Béhé 19'	Details	Krištić 29'	Stadium: Choa Chu Kang Stadium; Referee: G. Letchman

20 May	Albirex Niigata (S)	2 – 0	Geylang International	Kallang, Singapore
19:45 UTC+08:00	Tanaka 45'; Jitozono 90'	Details		Stadium: Jalan Besar Stadium; Referee: Jansen Foo

=== Matchday 15 ===
10 June	Albirex Niigata (S)	3 – 2	Warriors FC	Jurong East, Singapore
20:00 UTC+08:00	Inui 24', 26'; Ishiyama 89'	Details	Rak 37'; Béhé 65'	Stadium: Jurong East Stadium; Referee: Sukhbir Singh

10 June	Balestier Khalsa	2 – 2	Hougang United	Kallang, Singapore
20:00 UTC+08:00	Tokić 10'; Fazli 60'	Details	Kogure 86'; Plazibat 90'	Stadium: Jalan Besar Stadium; Referee: Nathan Chan

11 June	Garena Young Lions	2 – 2	Home United	Kallang, Singapore
20:00 UTC+08:00	Khairul A. 22'; Firdaus 49'	Details	Khairul N. 53'; Ilsø 90'	Stadium: Jalan Besar Stadium; Referee: G. Letchman

11 June	Tampines Rovers	4 – 3	DPMM FC	Jurong West, Singapore
20:00 UTC+08:00	Fazrul 38'; Webb 45'; Mehmet 63'; Pennant 79'	Details	Hendra 43'; Ramazotti 57', 70'	Stadium: Jurong West Stadium; Referee: Muhd Taqi

=== Matchday 16 ===
14 June	Tampines Rovers	6 – 1	Garena Young Lions	Jurong West, Singapore
20:00 UTC+08:00	Fazrul 20'; Webb 25', 48', 80'; Mustafić 41'; Pennant 78' (pen.)	Details	Fareez 33'	Stadium: Jurong West Stadium; Referee: Nathan Chan

14 June	Home United	1 – 3	Balestier Khalsa	Bishan, Singapore
20:00 UTC+08:00	Faris 53'	Details	Zulkiffli 45'; Smajović 65'; Jamil 75'	Stadium: Bishan Stadium; Referee: Muhd Taqi

15 June	Warriors FC	2 – 0	Geylang International	Choa Chu Kang, Singapore
20:00 UTC+08:00	Rak 2', 90'	Details		Stadium: Choa Chu Kang Stadium; Referee: Ahmad A'Qashah

15 June	Hougang United	1 – 2	Albirex Niigata (S)	Hougang, Singapore
20:00 UTC+08:00	Kapláň 39'	Details	Kawata 57'; Inui 62'	Stadium: Hougang Stadium; Referee: Farhad Mohd

=== Matchday 17 ===
17 June	Balestier Khalsa	2 – 3	Tampines Rovers	Toa Payoh, Singapore
20:00 UTC+08:00	Krištić 64'; Fadli 90'	Details	Mehmet 6'; Fazrul 43', 74'	Stadium: Toa Payoh Stadium; Referee: Sukhbir Singh

18 June	Albirex Niigata (S)	5 – 2	Home United	Jurong East, Singapore
20:00 UTC+08:00	Inui 3', 45'; Kawata 59'; Nagasaki 86', 87'	Details	Ilsø 79' (pen.); Khairul 81'	Stadium: Jurong East Stadium; Referee: Ahmad A'Qashah

18 June	Geylang International	1 – 2	Hougang United	Bedok, Singapore
20:00 UTC+08:00	Amy 90'	Details	Kapláň 63'; Plazibat 85'	Stadium: Bedok Stadium; Referee: Jansen Foo

19 June	Garena Young Lions	1 – 1	DPMM FC	Kallang, Singapore
20:00 UTC+08:00	Hazim 67'	Details	Ramazotti 32'	Stadium: Jalan Besar Stadium; Referee: W. Ravisanthiran

=== Matchday 18 ===
23 June	Home United	1 – 2	Geylang International	Bishan, Singapore
20:00 UTC+08:00	Shahrin 50'	Details	Sahil 89'; Quak 90'	Stadium: Bishan Stadium; Referee: Farhad Mohd

23 June	Hougang United	1 – 3	Warriors FC	Hougang, Singapore
20:00 UTC+08:00	Nurhilmi 40'	Details	Hafiz N. 61'; Shaiful 85'; Béhé 87'	Stadium: Hougang Stadium; Referee: G. Letchman

24 June	Tampines Rovers	1 – 0	Albirex Niigata (S)	Jurong West, Singapore
20:00 UTC+08:00	Fazrul 81'	Details		Stadium: Jurong West Stadium; Referee: Jansen Foo

24 June	Balestier Khalsa	1 – 4	DPMM FC	Kallang, Singapore
20:00 UTC+08:00	Lotinac 57' (pen.)	Details	Ramazotti 18', 30', 79'; Paulo Sérgio 50'	Stadium: Jalan Besar Stadium; Referee: Ahmad A'Qashah

=== Matchday 19 ===
4 August	Tampines Rovers	2 – 1	Geylang International	Jurong West, Singapore
19:30 UTC+08:00	Webb 21'; Mehmet 39'	Details	Hartmann 42'	Stadium: Jurong West Stadium; Referee: W. Ravisanthiran

4 August	Home United	3 – 0	Warriors FC	Bishan, Singapore
19:30 UTC+08:00	Ilsø 38', 89'; Song 64'	Details		Stadium: Bishan Stadium; Referee: Ahmad A'Qashah

5 August	Garena Young Lions	1 – 3	Balestier Khalsa	Kallang, Singapore
19:45 UTC+08:00	Swandi 87' (pen.)	Details	Tokić 9'; Krištić 18'; Kamis 25'	Stadium: Jalan Besar Stadium; Referee: Sukhbir Singh

5 August	DPMM FC	2 – 1	Albirex Niigata (S)	Bandar Seri Begawan, Brunei
20:15 UTC+08:00	Ramazotti 29' (pen.); Yura 90'	Details	Kumada 52'	Stadium: Hassanal Bolkiah National Stadium; Referee: Jansen Foo

=== Matchday 20 ===
11 August	Albirex Niigata (S)	4 – 0	Garena Young Lions	Jurong East, Singapore
19:30 UTC+08:00	Menda 46'; Nagasaki 84', 90+3'; Tatsuro 90'	Details		Stadium: Jurong East Stadium; Referee: Nathan Chan

11 August	Geylang International	1 – 1	DPMM FC	Bedok, Singapore
19:30 UTC+08:00	Camarasa 5'	Details	Rahman 71'	Stadium: Bedok Stadium; Referee: Farhad Mohd

12 August	Warriors FC	2 – 3	Tampines Rovers	Choa Chu Kang, Singapore
19:30 UTC+08:00	Béhé 23'; Ridhuan 34'	Details	Mehmet 1', 75' (pen.); Webb 57'	Stadium: Choa Chu Kang Stadium; Referee: G. Letchman

12 August	Hougang United	4 – 2	Home United	Kallang, Singapore
19:45 UTC+08:00	Plazibat 39' (pen.), 44' (pen.); Hussain 52'; Kogure 56'	Details	Ilsø 6'; Song 7'	Stadium: Jalan Besar Stadium; Referee: Muhd Taqi

=== Matchday 21 ===
17 August	Tampines Rovers	1 – 2	Hougang United	Jurong West, Singapore
19:30 UTC+08:00	Webb 45'	Details	Plazibat 22'; Kogure 90+2'	Stadium: Jurong West Stadium; Referee: Sukhbir Singh

18 August	Garena Young Lions	0 – 2	Geylang International	Kallang, Singapore
19:30 UTC+08:00		Details	Iskandar 50' (o.g.); Ng 82'	Stadium: Jalan Besar Stadium; Referee: W. Ravisanthiran

19 August	Balestier Khalsa	0 – 1	Albirex Niigata (S)	Kallang, Singapore
19:45 UTC+08:00		Details	Kumada 14'	Stadium: Jalan Besar Stadium; Referee: Ahmad A'Qashah

19 August	DPMM FC	3 – 0	Warriors FC	Bandar Seri Begawan, Brunei
20:15 UTC+08:00	Zulfadli 26' (o.g.); Ramazotti 60'; Paulo Sérgio 90+4'	Details		Stadium: Hassanal Bolkiah National Stadium; Referee: G. Letchman

=== Matchday 22 ===
25 August	Geylang International	2 – 1	Balestier Khalsa	Bedok, Singapore
19:30 UTC+08:00	Mark Hartmann 45'; Sahil Suhaimi 90'	Details	Niko Tokić 42' (pen.)	Stadium: Bedok Stadium; Referee: Nathan Chan

26 August	Warriors FC	5 – 2	Garena Young Lions	Choa Chu Kang, Singapore
19:30 UTC+08:00	Rak 22'; Béhé 25', 88'; Sulaiman 30'; Nor 63'	Details	Amri 64'; Salime 75'	Stadium: Choa Chu Kang Stadium; Referee: Farhad Mohd

26 August	Hougang United	1 – 2	DPMM FC	Kallang, Singapore
19:45 UTC+08:00	Plazibat 9'	Details	Ramazotti 51', 52'	Stadium: Jalan Besar Stadium; Referee: Ahmad A'Qashah

10 September	Home United	1 – 0	Tampines Rovers	Bishan, Singapore
19:30 UTC+08:00	Shamil 74'	Details		Stadium: Bishan Stadium; Referee: G. Letchman

=== Matchday 23 ===
22 September	Albirex Niigata (S)	1 – 0	Geylang International	Jurong East, Singapore
19:30 UTC+08:00	Shirota 76'	Details		Stadium: Jurong East Stadium; Referee: W. Ravisanthiran

22 September	Balestier Khalsa	1 – 1	Warriors FC	Toa Payoh, Singapore
19:30 UTC+08:00	Syafiq 87'	Details	Béhé 45' (pen.)	Stadium: Toa Payoh Stadium; Referee: G. Letchman

23 September	Garena Young Lions	0 – 2	Hougang United	Kallang, Singapore
19:45 UTC+08:00		Details	Hussain 45'; Jasni 71'	Stadium: Jalan Besar Stadium; Referee: Jansen Foo

23 September	DPMM FC	3 – 1	Home United	Bandar Seri Begawan, Brunei
20:15 UTC+08:00	Paulo Sérgio 36'; Ramazotti 72' (pen.); McLean 76'	Details	Ilsø 83' (pen.)	Stadium: Hassanal Bolkiah National Stadium; Referee: Nathan Chan

=== Matchday 24 ===
26 September	DPMM FC	5 – 3	Garena Young Lions	Bandar Seri Begawan, Brunei
20:15 UTC+08:00	McLean 4'; Ramazotti 8', 10', 90+3' (pen.); Kasmi 29'	Details	Faruk 46'; Amri 53', 60'	Stadium: Hassanal Bolkiah National Stadium; Referee: Farhad Mohd

30 September	Home United	5 – 2	Garena Young Lions	Bishan, Singapore
19:30 UTC+08:00	Azman 26'; Ilsø 45' (pen.); Jantan 64'; Ramli 84', 90+4'	Details	Faruk 30'; Syahin 70'	Stadium: Bishan Stadium; Referee: W. Ravisanthiran

30 September	Warriors FC	2 – 0	Albirex Niigata (S)	Kallang, Singapore
19:45 UTC+08:00	Ridhuan 9'; Béhé 86'	Details		Stadium: Jalan Besar Stadium; Referee: Muhd Taqi

1 October	Tampines Rovers	0 – 1	DPMM FC	Jurong West, Singapore
19:30 UTC+08:00		Details	Rahman 4'	Stadium: Jurong West Stadium; Referee: G. Letchman

1 October	Hougang United	1 – 1	Balestier Khalsa	Hougang, Singapore
19:30 UTC+08:00	Plazibat 8'	Details	Syafiq 70'	Stadium: Hougang Stadium; Referee: Farhad Mohd

=== Matchday 25 ===
14 October	Geylang International	2 – 1	Warriors FC	Bedok, Singapore
19:30 UTC+08:00	Recha 73'; Sulaiman 77'	Details	Jaffar 52'	Stadium: Bedok Stadium; Referee: Sukhbir Singh

14 October	Albirex Niigata (S)	3 – 0	Hougang United	Kallang, Singapore
19:45 UTC+08:00	Kawata 4'; Jitozono 8'; Kumada 32'	Details		Stadium: Jalan Besar Stadium; Referee: Farhad Mohd

15 October	Garena Young Lions	1 – 3	Tampines Rovers	Kallang, Singapore
19:30 UTC+08:00	Syaffiq 57'	Details	Mehmet 54'; Hanapi 61'; Webb 76'	Stadium: Jalan Besar Stadium; Referee: W. Ravisanthiran

15 October	Balestier Khalsa	0 – 5	Home United	Toa Payoh, Singapore
19:30 UTC+08:00		Details	Song 12'; Fandi 22', 45'; Jantan 30'; Ang 81'	Stadium: Toa Payoh Stadium; Referee: Ahmad A'Qashah

=== Matchday 26 ===
20 October	Home United	3 – 1	Albirex Niigata (S)	Bishan, Singapore
19:30 UTC+08:00	Ilsø 22', 86'; Sharif 65'	Details	Ilsø 57' (o.g.)	Stadium: Bishan Stadium; Referee: Nathan Chan

20 October	Hougang United	0 – 1	Geylang International	Hougang, Singapore
19:30 UTC+08:00		Details	Suhaimi 43'	Stadium: Hougang Stadium; Referee: G. Letchman

22 October	Tampines Rovers	2 – 0	Balestier Khalsa	Kallang, Singapore
19:30 UTC+08:00	Hamzah 39'; Mehmet 90+3'	Details		Stadium: Jalan Besar Stadium; Referee: Farhad Mohd

=== Matchday 27 ===
25 October	Warriors FC	5 – 1	Hougang United	Choa Chu Kang, Singapore
19:30 UTC+08:00	Béhé 51', 69', 90+3'; Rak 57'; Jaffar 81'	Details	Hussain 37'	Stadium: Choa Chu Kang Stadium; Referee: Nathan Chan

25 October	Geylang International	4 – 1	Home United	Bedok, Singapore
19:30 UTC+08:00	Hartmann 7'; Ghani 69'; Quak 83'; Bennett 90+2'	Details	Ilsø 50'	Stadium: Bedok Stadium; Referee: Jansen Foo

26 October	Balestier Khalsa	2 – 0	DPMM FC	Toa Payoh, Singapore
19:30 UTC+08:00	Tokić 67'; Krištić 90+5'	Details		Stadium: Toa Payoh Stadium; Referee: Sukhbir Singh

26 October	Albirex Niigata (S)	1 – 5	Tampines Rovers	Kallang, Singapore
19:45 UTC+08:00	Ishiyama 90'	Details	Mehmet 9'; Webb 37'; Silvas 42', 73'; Sulaiman 64'	Stadium: Jalan Besar Stadium; Referee: Ahmad A'Qashah

^A The match, originally scheduled on 19 February, was postponed due to bad weather.

== Season statistics ==
=== Scoring ===
==== Top scorers ====
As of matches played on 31 October 2016.

Rank	Player	Club	Goals
1	(Brazil) Rafael Ramazotti	(Brunei) DPMM FC	20
2	(France) Jonathan Béhé	Warriors FC	19
2	(Denmark) Ken Ilsø	Home United	19
4	(Croatia) Stipe Plazibat	Hougang United	15
5	(Japan) Atsushi Kawata	(Japan) Albirex Niigata (S)	13
6	(Canada) Jordan Webb	Tampines Rovers	12
6	(Republic of Ireland) Billy Mehmet	Tampines Rovers	12
8	(Japan) Tatsuro Inui	(Japan) Albirex Niigata (S)	10

==== Hat-tricks ====
Player	For	Against	Result	Date
(Japan) Atsushi Kawata	(Japan) Albirex Niigata (S)	(Singapore) Young Lions	5–0	20 February 2016
(Japan) Atsushi Kawata	(Japan) Albirex Niigata (S)	Home United	3–0	8 April 2016
(Canada) Jordan Webb	Tampines Rovers	(Singapore) Young Lions	6–1	14 June 2016
(Brazil) Rafael Ramazotti	(Brunei) DPMM FC	Balestier Khalsa	4–1	24 June 2016
(Brazil) Rafael Ramazotti	(Brunei) DPMM FC	(Singapore) Young Lions	5–3	26 September 2016
(France) Jonathan Béhé	Warriors FC	Hougang United	5–1	25 October 2016

Note

^{4} Player scored 4 goals

=== Discipline ===
As of matches played on 31 October 2016.

==== Player ====
- Most yellow cards: 7
  - Al-Qaasimy Rahman (Geylang International)
  - Stanely Ng (Geylang International)
  - Anumanthan Kumar (Hougang United)
  - Faiz Salleh (Hougang United)
  - Nurhilmi Jasni (Hougang United)
  - Raihan Rahman (Hougang United)
  - Shakir Hamzah (Tampines Rovers)
- Most red cards: 2
  - Madhu Mohana (Warriors)

==== Club ====
- Most yellow cards: 61
  - Geylang International
- Most red cards: 5
  - Warriors

== S-League Awards Night Winners ==
Awards	Winners	Club
Player of the Year	(Japan) Atsushi Kawata	(Japan) Albirex Niigata (S)
Young Player of the Year	M.Anumanthan	Hougang United
Coach of the Year	(Japan) Naoki Naruo	(Japan) Albirex Niigata (S)
Top Scorer Award	(Brazil) Rafael Ramazotti	(Brunei) DPMM FC
Fair Play Award	(Japan) Albirex Niigata (S)	
Referee of the Year	Sukhbir Singh	
