= Thomas Beattie (footballer) =

English footballer (born 1986)

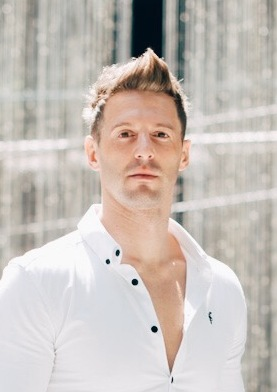

Personal information
- Full name: Thomas Edward Beattie
- Date of birth: 16 September 1986 (age 40)
- Place of birth: Goole, East Riding of Yorkshire, England
- Position: Attacking midfielder

Youth career
- Hull City

College career
Years	Team	Apps	(Gls)
2005–2007	Limestone Saints		

Senior career*
Years	Team	Apps	(Gls)
2008–2009	Forest City London	38	(7)
2010–2011	London City	49	(15)
2012–2013	Ottawa Fury	23	(3)
2013–2014	Hougang United	23	(5)
2014–2015	Warriors	31	(4)
Total		164	(34)
- * Club domestic league appearances and goals

Thomas Beattie (born 16 September 1986) is an English entrepreneur and former professional footballer who played as a midfielder. His football career spanned over ten years before a serious head injury forced him to retire.

== Early ==
Beattie was born in Goole, East Riding of Yorkshire, England on 16 September 1986.

Beattie was scouted for Hull City, Leeds United and Blackburn Rovers. Beattie started at the academy of Hull City at the age of 9. He progressed through the youth ranks into the reserve team at the age of 16. He was educated at Vermuyden School until the age of 15. After establishing himself in the reserve team, he found first team opportunities hard to come by following the club's promotion to the Premier League. He left at the age of 19 to play and study in the United States on a football scholarship.

== Playing career ==
=== Collegiate ===
Beattie moved to the United States to study at Limestone College. During his time with the Saints, he became the program's first ever Adidas All-American Athlete. The 2006 squad that Beattie was a part of was named in the Limestone College Hall of Fame in 2018. After graduating, he was set to sign with Norwegian Premier League club Sandefjord, but he changed his mind. He also had a trial with Scottish Premier League club Kilmarnock, who offered him a contact but he turned it down and went back to North America.

=== Professional ===
==== Forest City London ====
In 2008, Beattie moved to Canada to play for Forest City London in the USL Premier Development League and made 38 appearances in midfield, scoring seven times.

==== London City ====
Beattie signed with London City of the Canadian Soccer League in 2010. He recorded his first goal for the club on 28 May 2010 against TFC Academy. At the conclusion of the season he received the CSL Rookie of the Year award. He re-signed with London for the 2011 season. In two seasons at the club, he scored 15 goals in 49 club appearances.

==== Ottawa Fury ====
Beattie joined Canadian side Ottawa Fury after completing his studies in 2012, before exploring further afield towards Asia.

==== Hougang United ====
In November 2012, Beattie signed for S.League side Hougang United. He was signed by Alex Weaver for the 2013–14 season, where he went on to captain the club in what was a difficult season. During his time at the club, Weaver was fired after only five games, which resulted in a managerial merry-go-round for the rest of the season.

==== Warriors ====
The following season Beattie was signed by his former manager Alex Weaver for S.League club Warriors for an undisclosed fee, where they won the league title in his debut season. Beattie played in the Championship winning team along with the likes of Daniel Bennett, Nicolás Vélez and Hassan Sunny.

Beattie returned to the club the following 2015–16 season and started the season where the previous one had left off. The club secured the 2015 Singapore Charity Shield beating Balestier Khalsa 1–0. As a result of winning the Championship in 2015 the club qualified for the AFC Champions League. The first game of the group stages was against Yadanarbon which they won 6–5 on penalties. The second group game which they ultimately lost 3–0 was against Chinese Super League giants, Guangzhou R&F.

Shortly after the AFC Champions League campaign he sustained a life-threatening injury in a head collision during a game against Geylang International resulting in a brain haemorrhage and facial fractures to the cheek, nose, eye sockets and forehead forcing him to retire.

== Post-playing career ==
Beattie is the co-founder of several companies based throughout Asia. Specialising in mobile technology, and product development, Beattie has commercial interests in the fitness industry throughout South East Asia.

Beattie has modelled for various brands and products throughout Asia and has featured in Esquire and ExpatLiving.

== Personal life ==
On 23 June 2020, Beattie came out as gay in an interview with ESPN. In February 2022, he told Goal.com that his career-ending injury was the catalyst for revealing his sexuality. "It was a big catalyst for me, to learn to embrace every part of myself and be ok with it," he said. "After training, I used to go home and lay on my bed looking at the ceiling, praying that I would wake up and it would all go away. I still think if I was playing now, I'd still not be out."
