= Gary Loo =

Singaporean footballer

Personal information
- Full name: Gary Loo Zhan Quan
- Date of birth: 22 April 1992 (age 34)
- Place of birth: Singapore
- Position: Midfielder

Team information
- Current team: Balestier Khalsa
- Number: 25

Senior career*
Years	Team	Apps	(Gls)
2011	Tanjong Pagar	30	(0)
2012	Young Lions	2	(0)
2016–	Balestier Khalsa	4	(0)
- * Club domestic league appearances and goals as of 12 January 2017

Gary Loo Zhan Quan is a Singaporean footballer who plays for Balestier Khalsa FC as a midfielder. He started his career with Tanjong Pagar in 2011.

== Club career ==
Loo started his career in 2011 where he played for the Tanjong Pagar United FC where he made 30 league appearances.

He then move to the Under–23 team, Young Lions for the 2012 S.League campaign.

After being clubless, or a free agent for 3 to 4 years, he finally get to be back in the S.League where he played for Balestier.

== Career statistics ==
=== Club ===
As of match played November 2016. Caps and goals may not be correct.

Club	Season	S.League		Singapore Cup		Singapore League Cup		Asia		Total	
Club	Season	Apps	Goals	Apps	Goals	Apps	Goals	Apps	Goals	Apps	Goals
Tanjong Pagar	2011	30	0	1	0	1	0	—		32	0
Tanjong Pagar	Total	30	0	1	0	1	0	0	0	32	0
Young Lions	2012	2	0	-	-	0	0	—		2	0
Young Lions	Total	2	0	0	0	0	0	0	0	2	0
Balestier Khalsa	2016	4	0	2	0	3	0	5	0	14	0
Balestier Khalsa	2017	0	0	0	0	0	0	0	0	0	0
Balestier Khalsa	Total	4	0	2	0	3	0	5	0	14	0
Career Total		36	0	3	0	4	0	5	0	48	0

- Young Lions are ineligible for qualification to AFC competitions in their respective leagues.
- Young Lions withdrew from the 2012 Singapore Cup, due to participation in AFC and AFF youth competitions.
