= Patrick Hesse =

French football coach (born 1956)

Personal information
- Date of birth: 1956 (age 69–70)
- Place of birth: France

Managerial career
- Years: Team
- 1992–1999: Forbach
- 1999–2010: Nancy (youth)
- 2010–2012: Metz (assistant)
- 2012–2013: Dudelange
- 2014: Laval (assistant)
- 2014–2015: Mali (assistant)
- 2015: Tunisia (assistant)
- 2016–2017: Young Lions

Patrick Hesse (born 1956) is a French football coach who was last contracted to Young Lions.

== Early life ==
Hesse spent most of his childhood in Creutzwald, where he started to play football.

== Playing career ==
Until age 16, Hesse played amateur football in Creutzwald before moving to ply his trade with a club in Saint-Avold and then in Merlebach. On one occasion, he could have signed for FC Metz in 1980 but financial difficulties precluded the club from making the deal.

== Coaching career ==
=== France ===
Spending seven years in charge of US Forbach in the Championnat de France Amateur, Hesse joined AS Nancy as a coach in 1999 where he served in numerous positions until 2010- one season as manager of the U-17 side, eight seasons in charge of the U18 Training and Educator Center, and three seasons responsible for pre-training. Three years later, in 2014, the Creutzwald native went back to France as the Laval manager at the time, Denis Zanko, contacted him for the assistant job, which he took and signed a one-and-a-half-year contract.

=== Dudelange ===
Back in November 2012, Hesse replaced Didier Philippe as manager of F91 Dudelange in the Luxembourg National Division. Six months later, he left the Luxembourgish outfit by mutual agreement and took a ten-month managerial training course.

=== Africa ===
One of Hesse's contacts, Michel Gruhn, put him in touch with then Mali coach Henryk Kasperczak, who hired Hesse with immediate effect as assistant since he knew him from his time with FC Metz. A month later, the assistant manager followed Henryk Kasperczak to coach Tunisia after Mali's participation in the CAN 2015. That summer, however, Hesse's contract was cancelled by the board for various purposes.

=== Young Lions ===
Hesse was given the Young Lions manager role ahead of the 2016 S.League as part of a coaching contingent summoned by FAS technical director Michel Sablon to go to Singapore. Even though the Frenchman arrived in Singapore in January, his official appointment as coach was deferred until he got his work pass one month later and was sanctioned to do business in the country. His first match in charge was a 1–0 triumph over Balestier Khalsa before losing twice in a row to Albirex Niigata S and Geylang International by 5–0 and 2–0 goal deficits. Early in the season, Hesse was also impressed with Albirex Niigata S and wanted the Young Lions to model their style of play after Albirex Niigata's. Ahead of the 2017 S.League, Hesse left his post, having not been complacent with the club's last place finish.

== Personal life ==
The former player is married and has children.

== Licenses ==
- UEFA Pro License
- UEFA 'A' License
- UEFA Elite Youth License
