= Niko Tokić =

Croatian footballer

Personal information
- Full name: Niko Tokić
- Date of birth: 6 July 1988 (age 38)
- Place of birth: Zagreb, SR Croatia, SFR Yugoslavia
- Height: 1.85 m (6 ft 1 in)
- Position: Striker

Senior career*
Years	Team	Apps	(Gls)
2009–2010	Karlovac	25	(3)
2010–2011	Šibenik	25	(2)
2011–2012	Varaždin	15	(2)
2012	Cibalia	11	(0)
2013–2014	Šiauliai	62	(26)
2015	Sun Pegasus	6	(2)
2015–2016	Hrvatski Dragovoljac	21	(6)
2016–2017	Balestier Khalsa	9	(4)
2017–2019	NK Zagreb		
- * Club domestic league appearances and goals

Niko Tokić (born 6 July 1988) is a retired Croatian footballer who played as a striker. Apart from his native Croatia, Tokić also had playing stints for clubs in Lithuania, Hong Kong, and Singapore.

== Club career ==
=== FK Šiauliai ===
During his time with FK Šiauliai, Tokić enjoyed his most prolific spell in professional football thus far, scoring 19 goals in 35 league matches in the A Lyga, winning the league's Golden Boot award for the 2014 season in the process.

=== Hong Kong Pegasus ===
After 2 prolific seasons playing for FK Šiauliai, with Tokić scoring a total of 26 goals in 68 competitive matches, Hong Kong club Hong Kong Pegasus expressed interest in signing him, and on 14 January 2015, it was reported that Tokić has agreed to an 18-month deal with the club, bringing an end to his 2-year stint with the Lithuanian side. Following his move, Tokić only managed to make a total of 9 competitive appearances for the Hong Kong side before the end of the season. He subsequently moved back to Croatia, where he joined NK Hrvatski Dragovoljac for the 2015–16 Druga HNL season.

=== NK Hrvatski Dragovoljac ===
Following his departure from Hong Kong Pegasus, Tokić joined Croatian Second Football League side NK Hrvatski Dragovoljac. He scored 6 goals in 21 appearances, making his final appearance for the club on 21 May 2016, securing a 1–0 win over NK Dugopolje.

=== Balestier Khalsa ===
On 31 May 2016, it was reported that Singapore club Balestier Khalsa was close to securing a transfer deal for Tokić to join the club midway through the 2016 S.League season, subject to a medical examination, the S.League's mandatory running test and the necessary paperwork. Earlier reports had stated the impending arrival of Tokić was to replace Croatian striker Robert Peričić, who was injured for the first half of the season. On 3 June 2016, it was confirmed that Tokić has officially signed professional terms with the club. Tokić made his full competitive debut for Balestier Khalsa on 10 June 2016, in a S.League match against Hougang United. He played the entire 90 minutes, scoring just 10 minutes into the game, his first for the club and the first goal of the match. The match subsequently ended in a 2–2 draw.

== Career statistics ==
As of 13:46, 3 June 2016 (UTC)

Club	Season	Prva HNL		Croatian Football Cup		Croatian Supercup		Regional		Total	
Club	Season	Apps	Goals	Apps	Goals	Apps	Goals	Apps	Goals	Apps	Goals
NK Karlovac	2009–10	22	3	0	0	0	0	—		22	3
NK Karlovac	2010–11	3	0	0	0	0	0	—		3	0
NK Karlovac	Total	25	3	0	0	0	0	—		25	3
HNK Šibenik	2010–11	21	2	1	1	0	0	—		22	3
HNK Šibenik	2011–12	4	0	0	0	0	0	—		4	0
HNK Šibenik	Total	25	2	1	1	0	0	—		26	3
NK Varaždin	2011–12	15	2	1	0	0	0	—		16	2
HNK Cibalia	2012–13	11	0	2	0	0	0	—		13	0
FK Šiauliai	2013	27	7	3	0	0	0	—		30	7
FK Šiauliai	2014	35	19	3	0	0	0	—		38	19
FK Šiauliai	Total	62	26	9	0	0	0	—		68	26
Club	Season	HK Premier League		HK FA Cup		HKFA League Cup		Regional		Total	
Club	Season	Apps	Goals	Apps	Goals	Apps	Goals	Apps	Goals	Apps	Goals
Hong Kong Pegasus	2014–15	6	2	1	1	1	0	1	0	9	3
Club	Season	Druga HNL		Croatian Football Cup		Croatian Supercup		Regional		Total	
Club	Season	Apps	Goals	Apps	Goals	Apps	Goals	Apps	Goals	Apps	Goals
NK Hrvatski Dragovoljac	2015–16	21	6	0	0	0	0	—		21	6
Club	Season	S.League		Singapore Cup		Singapore League Cup		Regional		Total	
Club	Season	Apps	Goals	Apps	Goals	Apps	Goals	Apps	Goals	Apps	Goals
Balestier Khalsa	2016	8	4	5	4	3	2	—		16	10
Career total		173	45	19	6	4	2	1	0	197	53

== Honours ==
=== Individual ===
- A Lyga
  - Golden Boot - 2014
