= Jeremy Chiang =

Singaporean footballer (born 1985)

Personal information
- Full name: Jeremy Chiang Wei Jian
- Date of birth: 11 April 1985 (age 41)
- Place of birth: Singapore
- Height: 1.82 m (5 ft 11 1/2 in)
- Position: Right back

Team information
- Current team: ActiveSG FA (Head coach); Still Aerion WFC (Head coach)

Senior career*
Years	Team	Apps	(Gls)
2005	Paya Lebar Punggol	13	(0)
2006-2007	Young Lions	11	(0)
2007	Home United	3	(0)
2008–2011	Gombak United	109	(2)
2012	Home United	20	(1)
2013	Hougang United	11	(0)
2013–2014	Warriors FC	22	(0)
2016	Warriors FC	0	(0)

International career
2006–2010	Singapore	3	(0)

Managerial career
- 2019–present: ActiveSG FA
- 2024–present: Still Aerion WFC
- * Club domestic league appearances and goals

Jeremy Chiang Wei Jian (born 11 April 1985) is a Singaporean former professional footballer who played as a right-back for Warriors FC in the S-League. Jeremy is now an entrepreneur and head coach with ActiveSG Football Academy (AFA) and Still Aerion WFC.

== Playing career ==
Jeremy was part of the Warriors team that won the 2014 S.League. He retired from the game because of a ACL injury in 2014. He went on to be The New Paper’s S.League pundit after retiring.

In 2016, Jeremy returned to top-flight football with the Warriors FC. However, he got into trouble as he offered betting tips as in The New Paper (TNP) for all of the week's S.League matches. The Football Association of Singapore requested both the player and the club to provide an explanation.

In a club statement, the Warriors FC said that the predictions were made prior to the signing with the club. After signing with the club, Jeremy had informed TNP that he would stop providing his free voluntary predictions with immediate effect.

== Coaching career ==
Jeremy joined ActiveSG Football Academy in 2017. He went on to become the head coach in 2019, helming programmes at Toa Payoh.

In 2024, Jeremy was appointed as the head coach of the Still Aerion WFC. The club finished fourth after losing 6-0 to Lion City Sailors in their final game of the 2024 season.

== Outside football ==
Jeremy opened a cafe The WEJS with Walid Lounis and their spouses after suffering a serious injury in early 2014.

He also started his own business Churros Factory with his wife in 2014.

== Personal life ==
Jeremy is married with Png Suyi. They have a daughter, Sasha and a son. Like his father, he is also a defender who played for ActiveSG FA elite team and then the Junior Development Centre (JDC) Under-11 team.

== Honours ==
=== Club ===
Warriors FC

- S.League: 2014
