= Rizal Rahman =

Singaporean footballer

Personal information
- Full name: Muhammad Rizal bin Abdul Rahman
- Date of birth: 13 February 1979 (age 47)
- Place of birth: Singapore
- Position: Goalkeeper

Senior career*
Years	Team	Apps	(Gls)
- Home United FC
- Balestier Central FC
- Home United FC
-2006	Balestier Khalsa FC		

Managerial career
- 2021–: Tanjong Pagar United (U15) (GK Coach)
- * Club domestic league appearances and goals

Muhammad Rizal bin Abdul Rahman (born 13 February 1979 in Singapore) is a Singaporean retired footballer.

== Career ==
Rizal started playing football in the void deck of his HDB building as his elementary school did not have a team. He then joined the youth squad of Tampines Rovers Sports Club.

After starting out with the Home United Prime League squad, Rizal spent the rest of his career with Balestier Central (later known as Balestier Khalsa), even though he returned in 2004 to play for the Protectors for a season before heading back to Toa Payoh Stadium to sign for the Tigers in 2005.
