= Branko Čubrilo =

Croatian professional football forward

Personal information
- Date of birth: 20 May 1988 (age 38)
- Place of birth: Split, Croatia
- Height: 1.81 m (5 ft 11 in)
- Positions: Forward; left winger

Team information
- Current team: Caspiy

Youth career
- 1995-2006: Val Kaštel Stari

Senior career*
Years	Team	Apps	(Gls)
2005-2006	Val Kaštel Stari	30	(25)
2007	Mosor Žrnovnica	6	(0)
2007–2011	Hajduk Split	2	(0)
2008–2011	→ Solin (loan)	74	(9)
2011–2013	Val Kaštel Stari	53	(38)
2013–2014	Vitez	6	(0)
2014–2015	Val Kaštel Stari	14	(6)
2015–2016	Zmaj Blato		
2016	Geylang International	11	(3)
2016	Zmaj Blato		
2017	GOŠK Kaštel Gomilica		
2018	Zadar		
2018-2020	Caspiy	15+	(0+)
2021-	GOŠK Kaštel Gomilica		
- * Club domestic league appearances and goals

Branko Čubrilo (born 20 May 1988) is a Croatian professional football forward who plays for GOŠK Kaštel Gomilica.

== Club career ==
Čubrilo transferred to Geylang International in 2016. He was deemed an imposing threat in the S.League and sought to emulate Croatian Miroslav Kristic in his debut season.

Though managing to a brace on one occasion, he generally performed poorly in front of goal, causing coach Hasrin Jailani to deploy him on the left-wing instead. In the end, he was released by Geylang International to facilitate the arrival of Filipino Mark Hartmann, in mid 2016.
