= Stipe Plazibat =

Croatian footballer

Personal information
- Full name: Stipe Plazibat
- Date of birth: 31 August 1989 (age 37)
- Place of birth: Split, SR Croatia, SFR Yugoslavia
- Height: 1.85 m (6 ft 1 in)
- Position: Forward

Youth career
- 2000–2007: Hajduk Split
- 2007: Solin

Senior career*
Years	Team	Apps	(Gls)
2008–2011	Solin	40	(5)
2011	Šibenik	8	(0)
2012	Dugopolje	13	(2)
2012–2013	Rabotnički	28	(1)
2013–2014	Gifu	19	(5)
2014–2015	V-Varen Nagasaki	17	(3)
2015	Dugopolje	14	(1)
2016	Hougang United	24	(15)
2017	Home United	22	(25)
2018	Bangkok Glass	9	(3)
2018–2019	Solin	8	(1)
2019–2020	Hougang United	24	(14)
2020–2021	Lion City Sailors	25	(23)
2022	Academica Clinceni	5	(0)
2022	Perak	6	(1)
2023	Uskok Klis	5	(1)
- * Club domestic league appearances and goals as of 27 November 2023

Stipe Plazibat (Croatian pronunciation: [stǐːpe plǎzibat]; born 31 August 1989) is a Croatian former professional footballer who played as a forward.

== Career ==
=== FC Gifu ===
On 8 August 2013, Plazibat signed for J2 League side FC Gifu. He made his debut on 18 August, as an 85th-minute substitute versus Mito HollyHock. On 1 September, he scored his first goal for FC Gifu, scoring in the 82nd minute in a 2–1 loss to Tokyo Verdy, after coming on as a substitute at half time. On 11 July 2014, it was announced Plazibat had left the club.

=== V-Varen Nagasaki ===
On 15 July 2014, Plazibat signed for fellow J2 League side V-Varen Nagasaki.

=== Hougang United ===
On 30 January 2016, Plazibat joined S-League side Hougang United after impressing in 2 trial games with 3 goals and 2 assists. He scored his first competitive goal for the Cheetahs on his competitive debut, winning the Cheetahs' first 3 points of the season. He scored his second in as many games against title favourites Tampines Rovers. Plazibat's 5th goal in 5 games sent Hougang to the top of the table in the 5th round of the 2016 S.League season. In total, he scored 16 times in 24 league games for the Cheetahs before moving to Home United.

=== Home United ===
After his contract was not renewed by the Hougang United's management, Plazibat moved to local rivals, Home United.

His start with the team saw him scoring in the AFC Cup qualifying round against Phnom Penh Crown over 2 legs while he also scored 4 goals in his Home United league debut in the 1st match in the 2017 season. He followed up his impressive early season form with 2 more goals against Brunei DPMM, bringing his league tally up to 6 goals from 2 games. He scored his 7th goal for Home in a top of the clash with Albirex Niigata (S) in his 3rd league game.

He continued his goalscoring form for the Protectors in a midweek AFC Cup game against Than Quảng Ninh, scoring 4 goals to help his side to a 5–4 victory in Vietnam, the second time he has scored 4 goals in 2017. This brings his total goals scored, in all competitions, to 11 goals in 8 games for his new club. He continued his fine goal scoring form by notching a brace in the uniform derby against Warriors FC, helping his side to a 2–2 draw. With that, he reached 10 goals in just 5 league appearances. It proved to be a productive season for Plazibat as he recorded 38 goals and 14 assists in all competitions for Home.

=== Bangkok Glass ===
Plazibat joined Bangkok Glass in January 2018, he left the club in June 2018. He scored a total of 3 goals in 9 games. In August 2018, he had a week-long trial period with Dundee scoring a goal in a friendly against Falkirk.

=== Return to NK Solin ===
In September 2018, Plazibat returned to his first senior club NK Solin after failing to secure a contract with Scottish side Dundee despite scoring a goal and an assist in a trial game. On 21 September 2018, he made his second league debut for the club as a substitute in a 3–2 loss against Šibenik.

=== Return to Hougang United ===
On 26 December 2018, Plazibat rejoined Hougang United for the 2019 Singapore Premier League season, looking to add on to the 16 goals he scored for the Cheetahs before moving to Home United. Having featured 51 times and scoring 25 goals in all competitions over 2 seasons, Plazibat had his contract with the Cheetahs extended for another season.⁣

Plazibat scored the first hat-trick of the 2020 Singapore Premier League season in his club's season opener against Young Lions, handing his club a 4–1 win.

=== Back to Home United (Lion City Sailors) ===
On 4 September 2020, it was announced that the Lion City Sailors had signed him for the rest of the season, replacing Andy Pengelly who left the club during mid-season.

=== Academica Clinceni ===
On 26 January 2022, Plazibat moved to Romania to join Academica Clinceni playing in the 2021–22 Liga I. As the first tier league was in FIFA 22, Plazibat make his first video games appearance.

=== Perak ===
On 26 January 2023, Plazibat returned to Asia to join Malaysia Premier League side, Perak. He helped his team promote to the 2023 Malaysia Super League.

=== NK Uskok Klis ===
On 26 January 2023, Plazibat returned home to play for NK Uskok Klis. On 11 April 2023, Plazibat announced his retirement from football.

== Others ==
=== Singapore selection squad ===
He was selected as part of the Singapore selection squad for The Sultan of Selangor's Cup to be held on 6 May 2017.

However, due to an injury sustained in a S.League match, he had to pull out from the squad.

== Career statistics ==
As of 25 February 2022

Appearances and goals by club, season and competition
Club	Season	League			National Cup		League Cup		Continental		Total	
Club	Season	Division	Apps	Goals	Apps	Goals	Apps	Goals	Apps	Goals	Apps	Goals
NK Solin	2008–09	Croatian Second Football League	?	?	?	?	?	?	?	?	?	?
NK Solin	2009–10	Croatian Second Football League	?	?	?	?	?	?	?	?	?	?
NK Solin	2010–11	Croatian Second Football League	?	?	?	?	?	?	?	?	?	?
NK Solin	Total		?	?	?	?	?	?	?	?	?	?
HNK Šibenik	2011–12	Croatian Second Football League	8	0	0	0	0	0	0	0	8	0
HNK Šibenik	Total		8	0	0	0	0	0	0	0	8	0
NK Dugopolje	2012–13	Croatian Second Football League	13	4	0	0	0	0	0	0	13	4
FK Rabotnički	2012–13	Macedonian First Football League	0	0	0	0	0	0	0	0	0	0
FC Gifu	2013	J.League Division 2	13	5	1	0	0	0	0	0	14	5
FC Gifu	2014	J.League Division 2	6	0	0	0	0	0	0	0	6	0
FC Gifu	Total		19	5	1	0	0	0	0	0	20	5
V-Varen Nagasaki	2015	J.League Division 2	15	1	1	0	0	0	0	0	16	1
NK Dugopolje	2015–16	Croatian Second Football League	11	4	0	0	0	0	0	0	11	4
Hougang United	2016	S.League	24	15	1	0	3	1	0	0	28	16
Home United	2017	S.League	22	25	4	0	3	2	10	10	39	37
Bangkok Glass FC	2018	Thai League 1	0	0	0	0	0	0	0	0	0	0
NK Solin	2018–19	Croatian Second Football League	8	1	0	0	0	0	0	0	8	1
Hougang United	2019	Singapore Premier League	21	9	2	0	0	0	0	0	23	9
Hougang United	2020	Singapore Premier League	3	5	0	0	0	0	3	4	6	9
Hougang United	Total		24	14	2	0	0	0	3	4	29	18
Lion City Sailors	2020	Singapore Premier League	8	9	0	0	0	0	0	0	8	9
Lion City Sailors	2021	Singapore Premier League	17	14	0	0	0	0	0	0	17	14
Lion City Sailors	Total		25	23	0	0	0	0	0	0	25	23
Academica Clinceni	2021–22	Liga I	5	0	0	0	0	0	0	0	5	0
Career total			169+	85+	8+	0+	6	2	12	14	195+	101+

== Honours ==
Nk Dugopolje

- 2. HNL: 2011–12

Lion City Sailors

- Singapore Premier League: 2021

Individual

- Singapore Premier League Top Scorer: 2020
- Singapore Premier League Team of the Year: 2020, 2021
- Singapore Premier League Player of the Month: April 2021
