= NK Bistra =

Croatian football club

Bistra
- Full name: Nogometni klub Bistra
- Founded: 1947
- Ground: SC Bistra
- Capacity: 8,000
- Chairman: Jadranko Marlot
- Manager: Kristijan Mitrečić
- League: 2. HNL
- 2013–14: 3. HNL – Center, 2nd
- Website: http://www.nk-bistra.hr
Home colours	Away colours

NK Bistra is a Croatian football club based in Donja Bistra, village part of Bistra municipality, located just north-west of the Croatian capital Zagreb.

== History ==
NK Bistra was founded as NK Vatrogasac in 1947. Club changed its name to the present one in 1961.

Most of its history NK Bistra spent playing in lower and county leagues, achieving greatest success in 2014 by winning the second place in Croatian Third League which earned them promotion to Croatian Second League.
