= Sadin Smajović =

Serbian footballer

Personal information
- Date of birth: 10 May 1995 (age 31)
- Place of birth: Novi Pazar, Serbia
- Height: 1.82 m (6 ft 0 in)
- Position: Right midfielder

Youth career
- Novi Pazar

Senior career*
Years	Team	Apps	(Gls)
2014	Javor Ivanjica	3	(0)
2015–2016	Balestier Khalsa	16	(1)
2017–2019	Jošanica		
2020–2021	Tutin		
2021–2022	Jošanica		
- * Club domestic league appearances and goals

Sadin Smajović (born 10 May 1995) is a Serbian footballer.

== Career ==
Tallying one goal in sixteen league appearances as well as participating in the cup for Singapore S.League side Balestier Khalsa in 2016, Smajovic joined FK Josanica, a team based in Novi Pazar, in early 2017 following his release from Balestier Khalsa.

Balestier Khalsa posted fallacious information about the Serbian forward upon his departure, writing that he made six cup appearances when he had actually made eight.
