= Kevin McCann (footballer, born 1987) =

Scottish footballer

Personal information
- Full name: Kevin James McCann
- Date of birth: 11 September 1987 (age 39)
- Place of birth: Glasgow, Scotland
- Positions: Defender; midfielder

Senior career*
Years	Team	Apps	(Gls)
2006–2011	Hibernian	28	(2)
2010–2011	→ Inverness Caledonian Thistle (loan)	8	(1)
2011–2012	Greenock Morton	11	(0)
2012–2013	Livingston	39	(1)
2013	Raith Rovers	4	(0)
2014–2016	Warriors	42	(3)
2016	Falkirk	2	(0)
2016–2017	Albion Rovers	18	(0)
2017–2018	East Kilbride	?	(?)

International career
2007	Scotland U20	2	(0)
2007–2008	Scotland U21	4	(0)
- * Club domestic league appearances and goals

Kevin James McCann (born 11 September 1987) is a Scottish former footballer who last played for East Kilbride. He is primarily a defender who can also play in a defensive midfield role. He has represented Scotland at under-20 and under-21 levels.

== Club career ==
=== Hibernian ===
McCann started his senior career with Hibs. He made his first team debut in a Scottish Cup tie at Aberdeen on 10 January 2007. He remained in the first team squad after this and he appeared as a late substitute in Hibs' victory in the 2007 Scottish League Cup Final against Kilmarnock.

After the sale of Hibs' first choice right full-back Steven Whittaker to Rangers during the summer of 2007, it was expected that McCann would regularly play in the Hibs first team. McCann suffered from tendinitis in his right knee, which also led to him being withdrawn from the Scotland squad for the 2007 FIFA U-20 World Cup.

McCann's opportunities were further limited after the appointment of Mixu Paatelainen as manager. Paatelainen signed another right back, David van Zanten, for the 2008–09 season. McCann also suffered further problems with tendinitis in his right knee, which kept him out of action for the rest of the 2008–09 season. He resumed light training towards the end of the season.

McCann returned to fitness soon after the appointment of John Hughes as manager to the club. He played in the opening day win against St Mirren, but was subsequently injured again and did not make another appearance in the 2009–10 season.

After Hibs signed another right back during the 2010 close season (Michael Hart), McCann was loaned to Inverness Caledonian Thistle. McCann impressed in pre-season and started the first three league games. He scored his first goal for Inverness in his second league appearance, "an unstoppable shot into the top corner of the net from 30 yards" in a 4–0 win against Dundee United. McCann returned to Hibs in January 2011 at the end of his loan spell. Inverness manager Terry Butcher commented that he would have been signing McCann again, but he had suffered an injury that would prevent him from playing for up to eight weeks. McCann has not played for Hibs since returning from Inverness and he expected to be released at the end of the 2010–11 season. Hibs confirmed this in late April.

=== Greenock Morton ===
In August 2011, McCann played a trial match for Greenock Morton in the First Division victory over Livingston. On 22 August, McCann signed a short-term deal until January 2012. His contract was not extended following this deal and he was released.

=== Livingston ===
On 10 March 2012, he played in a trial match for Livingston against his former club Greenock Morton. Also setting up a goal for Iain Russell with a cross. After a further two games as a trialist, he signed for them on a short-term contract until the end of the season. McCann extended his stay with the West Lothian club by signing a new one-year contract in May 2012. McCann scored in a record victory, 8–0 against Stranraer in Scottish League Cup First round on 4 August 2012.

=== Raith Rovers ===
On 26 October 2013, McCann signed for Raith Rovers.

=== Warriors (Singapore) ===
When his deal at Raith Rovers ended coach Alex Weaver offered a contract to McCann who moved to Singapore, signing for S.League club Warriors Currently playing in a defensive midfield role where he scored his first S league goal against Harimau Muda B. Scoring also a vital 35-yard free kick against title rivals DPMM away in Brunei for Warriors to win 2–3. In his first season became a key player playing every match in the S.League winning season. He became the first Scottish player to ever win the Singapore S.League title. He won the 2014 S.League for Warriors; making it the club's ninth in their history.

=== Return to Scotland ===
McCann returned to Scotland in January 2016, signing for Scottish Championship side Falkirk on a short-term deal until the end of the season. Falkirk finished second in the league and were also runners-up in the play-off final.

In August 2016, McCann signed for Albion Rovers. After one season with the side, McCann moved to Lowland League side East Kilbride for the 2017–18 season.

== International career ==
McCann was selected for Scotland under-21 after breaking into the Hibs first team. He also earned selection for Scotland under–20 in the lead up to the 2007 FIFA U-20 World Cup, but was prevented from playing in the tournament due to injury.

== Honours ==
Hibernian

- Scottish League Cup: 2007

Warriors

- Singapore Premier League: 2014
- Singapore Charity Shield: 2015
