= Tatsuro Inui =

Japanese footballer (born 1990)

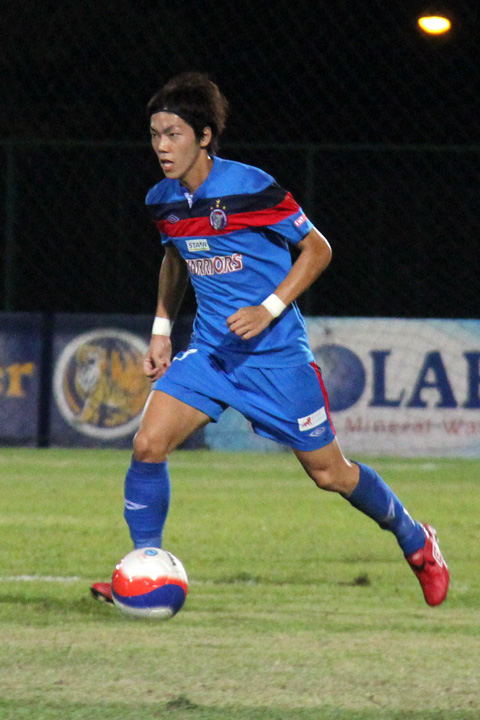
- Inui playing against Home United at Choa Chu Kang Stadium on 4 March 2012

Personal information
- Full name: Tatsuro Inui
- Date of birth: 30 January 1990 (age 36)
- Place of birth: Chiba, Japan
- Height: 1.70 m (5 ft 7 in)
- Position: Midfielder

Youth career
- 2005–2007: JEF United Chiba

Senior career*
Years	Team	Apps	(Gls)
2008	JEF United Chiba	0	(0)
2010–2011	Albirex Niigata Singapore	62	(20)
2012–2013	Warriors	43	(8)
2014	SC Sagamihara	0	(0)
2015	Geylang International	27	(1)
2016	Albirex Niigata Singapore	23	(10)
2017	Thai Honda Ladkrabang	3	(0)
2017	Blaublitz Akita	0	(0)
2018–2019	Nagaworld	6	(3)
- * Club domestic league appearances and goals as of 31 December 2015

Tatsuro Inui (乾 達朗, Inui Tatsuro; born 30 January 1990) is a retired Japanese football player. He plays as a winger, comfortable on both flanks. Apart from his speed and dribbling skills, the ability to take set pieces is also part of his key attributes.

== Career ==
Born and raised in Chiba Inui played for numerous clubs in and around the city before being signed to JEF United Chiba. He made his J1 League debut on 29 June 2008 in the 2008 J. League match against FC Tokyo. The game ended 1-1. Inui then signed for Albirex Niigata FC (Singapore) the Singapore S.League division of the Japanese-based Albirex Niigata in 2010.

In 2012, he went on to sign a 2-year contract with S.League side Singapore Armed Forces Football Club after his 2-year stint with the White Swans. He mentioned that having a chance to participate in AFC Cup was one of the main reason behind the move. Having won the 2012 RHB Singapore Cup, he will finally achieve his target in the following season. Unfortunately, the team was knocked out during the Group Stage having only won 1 out of the 6 games and lost the remainder.

After the end of his contract, Inui returned to Japan for trials. In January 2014, it was announced on J3 League side SC Sagamihara's official website that Inui has been signed by the club.

In September 2014, Inui was back in Singapore. He was seen undergoing a trial with Geylang International where he played a friendly match against his former club Warriors FC at the Bedok Stadium.

He re-signed for former club Albirex Niigata FC (Singapore) for the 2016 S.League season and scored his first goal of the season against Hougang United to send the White Swans to the top of the S.League table at the start of April.

After joining Thai Honda, he left in the midseason to join J3 club, Blaublitz Akita.

== Club career statistics ==
As of 27 December 2016

Club performance			League		Cup		League Cup		Total	
Season	Club	League	Apps	Goals	Apps	Goals	Apps	Goals	Apps	Goals
Japan			League		Emperor's Cup		J.League Cup		Total	
2007	JEF Reserves	Japan Football League	1	0	0	0	0	0	1	0
2008	JEF United Chiba	J.League Division 1	0	0	0	0	0	0	0	0
2008	JEF Reserves	Japan Football League	33	3	2	0	0	0	35	3
2009	JEF Reserves	Japan Football League	21	2	1	0	0	0	22	2
Singapore			League		Singapore Cup		League Cup		Total	
2010	Albirex Niigata FC (S)	S.League	29	6	3	0	0	0	32	6
2011	Albirex Niigata FC (S)	S.League	33	14	6	0	3	0	42	14
2012	Singapore Armed Forces FC	S.League	24	3	6	3	4	0	34	6
2013	Warriors FC	S.League	20	5	1	0	3	1	24	6
Japan			League		Emperor's Cup		J.League Cup		Total	
2014	SC Sagamihara	J3 League	0	0	0	0	0	0	0	0
Singapore			League		Singapore Cup		League Cup		Total	
2015	Geylang International	S.League	27	1	3	0	4	0	34	1
2016	Albirex Niigata FC (S)	S.League	23	8	4	0	4	2	31	10
Thailand			League		Thai FA Cup		League Cup		Total	
2017	Thai Honda F.C.	Thai League T1	?	?	?	?	?	?	?	?
Japan			League		Emperor's Cup		J.League Cup		Total	
2017	Blaublitz Akita	J3 League	0	0	0	0	0	0	0	0
Total
Total	Cambodia			League		Hun Sen Cup		CNCC Charity Cup		Total
2018	Nagaworld FC	Cambodian League	0	0	0	0	0	0	0	0
Total
Total	Japan		55	3	3	0	0	0	58	3
Total
Total	Cambodia									
Total
Total	Singapore		155	37	23	3	18	3	196	41
Total
Total	Thailand		?	?	?	?	?	?	?	?
Career total			155	37	23	3	18	3	196	41

== Honours ==
=== Club ===
S.League

- 2016: Champions

Singapore Cup

- 2012: Champions
- 2016: Champions

Singapore League Cup

- 2011: Champions
- 2016: Champions

Singapore Charity Shield

- 2016: Champions

Blaublitz Akita

- J3 League (1): 2017

Cambodian League

- 2018: Champion

=== Individual ===
- 2011 S.League Young Player of the Year
