= Jamil Ali =

Singapore international football player

Personal information
- Date of birth: May 2, 1984 (age 42)
- Place of birth: Singapore
- Height: 1.76 m (5 ft 9 1/2 in)
- Position: Winger

Senior career*
Years	Team	Apps	(Gls)
2001	Tampines Rovers	6	(0)
2002–2003	Geylang United	45	(13)
2004–2005	Young Lions	19	(2)
2006	Geylang United	18	(1)
2007–2008	SAFFC	57	(7)
2009	Woodlands Wellington	29	(4)
2010–2015	Tampines Rovers	125	(19)
2016	Balestier Khalsa	0	(0)
2017	Tampines Rovers	0	(0)

International career
2004–	Singapore	1	(0)
- * Club domestic league appearances and goals as of Dec 31, 2009

Jamil Ali is a former Singapore international footballer who plays as a midfielder.

== Playing career ==
Jamil started his career with Tampines Rovers before moving to Geylang United in 2002. He later was called to represent the Young Lions in 2004 before returning to Geylang United in 2006. After his contract with the Eagles end, he joined SAFFC in 2007 and won 2 league titles with them. In 2009, he joined Woodlands Wellington and moved back to Tampines Rovers in 2010 after the Rams decided against extending his contract.

After spending 6 seasons with The Stags, Jamil was seriously considering retirement from the sport when Balestier came calling. Attracted by the promise of ample playing time, Jamil put pen to paper and signed for Balestier.

== International career ==
He played for the Singapore national team once in 2004.

== Personal life ==
Jamil is the brother of Mohd Noor Ali who is currently the head coach of Singapore Premier League club Geylang International .
