= Robert Peričić =

Croatian footballer

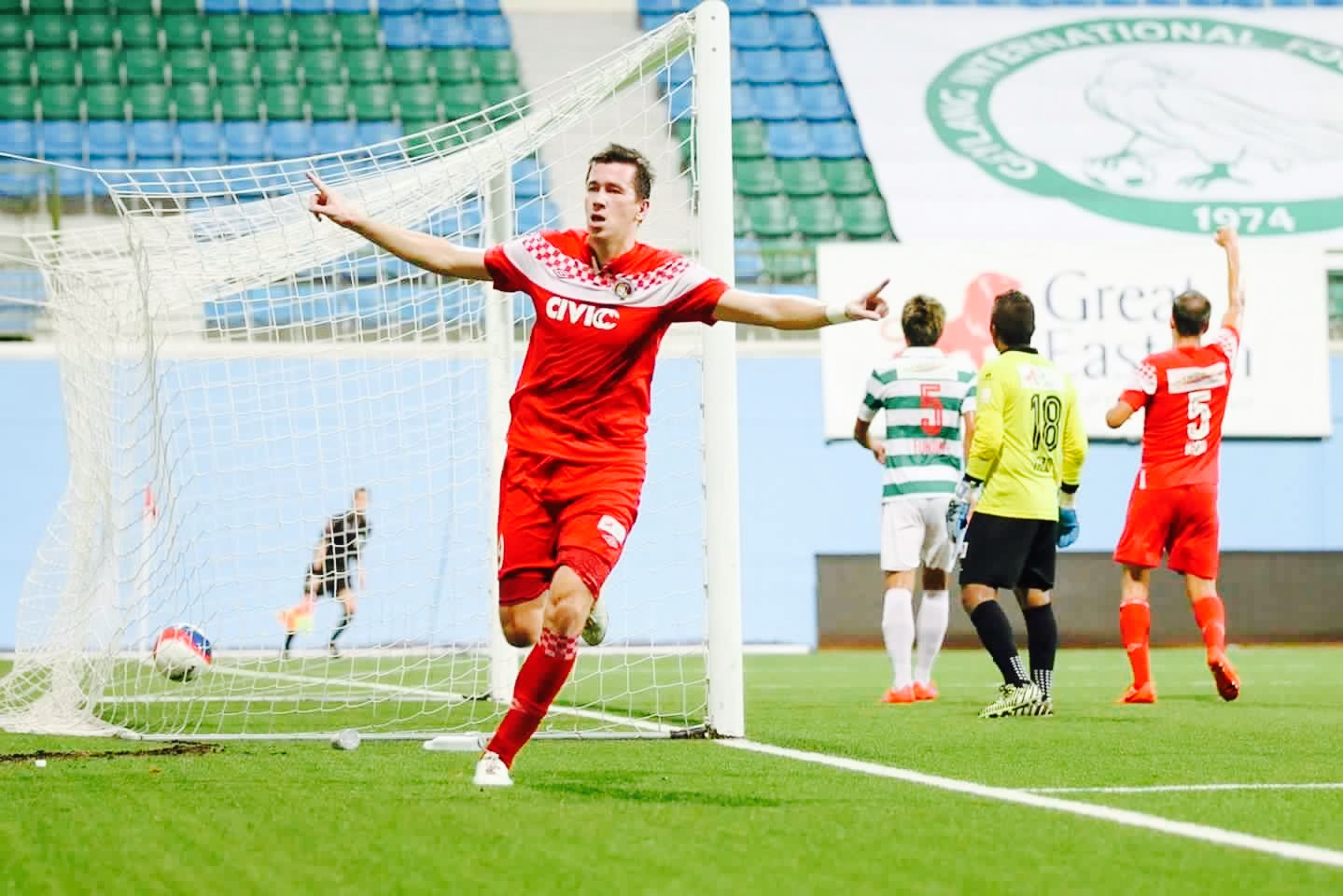
- Peričić playing for Balestier Khalsa in a match against Geylang International in 2015

Personal information
- Full name: Robert Peričić
- Date of birth: 15 June 1987 (age 39)
- Place of birth: Rijeka, Croatia
- Height: 1.92 m (6 ft 4 in)
- Position: Striker

Youth career
- 2004: Crikvenica

Senior career*
Years	Team	Apps	(Gls)
2004–2008	Crikvenica	72	(48)
2008–2010	Novalja	37	(14)
2010–2012	Crikvenica	41	(17)
2012–2013	NK Vinodol	28	(12)
2013–2014	Gorica	26	(5)
2014–2015	Hrvatski Dragovoljac	3	(0)
2015–2016	Balestier Khalsa	23	(9)
- * Club domestic league appearances and goals as of 13:46, 28 May 2016 (UTC)

Robert Peričić (born 15 June 1987) is a Croatian retired footballer who last played for Balestier Khalsa in the S.League.

== Career ==
=== Balestier Khalsa ===
Peričić moved to the S.League in 2015 to join Singaporean side Balestier Khalsa for the 2015 S.League season, after spending most of his professional career playing for clubs in the Croatian football leagues. On 6 March 2015, 5 days after Peričić's competitive debut for the club, he scored his first goal against Geylang International, securing a 2–1 win for his team. On 24 May 2016, following a series of knee injuries that ruled Peričić out for the first half of the 2016 S.League season, he was released with mutual consent by Balestier Khalsa having made a total of 28 competitive appearances and scoring 10 goals for the Tigers.

== Honours ==
- 2. HNL Man of the Match (6)
- 2. HNL Team of the Year (1)
- Singapore League Cup
  - Runner-up: 2015
