= Hazim Faiz =

Singaporean footballer

Hazim Faiz Hassan
Personal information
- Full name: Muhammad Hazim Faiz bin Hassan
- Date of birth: 28 September 1995 (age 31)
- Place of birth: Singapore
- Positions: Forward; winger

Senior career*
Years	Team	Apps	(Gls)
2014–2016	Warriors FC	8	(0)
2016–2017	Young Lions FC	10	(2)
2020-2020	Hougang United FC	0	(0)
2017–2023	Tiong Bahru FC	78	(14)
2024-	Singapore Cricket Club	14	(8)
- * Club domestic league appearances and goals

Muhammad Hazim Faiz bin Hassan (born 28 September 1995 in Singapore) is a Singaporean footballer who currently plays for National Football League club, Singapore Cricket Club. He is currently leading the top scorer charts in the Singapore Football League 1.

== Career ==
During his time in the Singapore Sports School, Faiz almost gave up football after constant criticism from coach Abdullah Noor.

== Honours ==
=== Individual ===
- Dollah Kassim Award recipients : 2013
