= Miroslav Pejić =

Croatian footballer

Personal information
- Full name: Miroslav Pejić
- Date of birth: February 16, 1986 (age 40)
- Place of birth: Derventa, SFR Yugoslavia (now Bosnia and Herzegovina)
- Height: 1.84 m (6 ft 0 in)
- Position: Striker

Youth career
- 2002–2005: NK Lokomotiva

Senior career*
Years	Team	Apps	(Gls)
2005–2011	NK Zagreb	94	(10)
2011–2012	Lučko	17	(2)
2012–2013	Hapoel Ramat Gan	1	(0)
2013	Lučko	7	(0)
2013–2014	Samobor	5	(1)
2014–2016	Warriors	47	(18)
2016–2017	Zagorec		
2017	Brežice 1919	5	(0)
2017-2018	Panargiakos		
- * Club domestic league appearances and goals as of 2 April 2017 (UTC)

Miroslav Pejić (born 16 February 1986) is a Croatian retired footballer, who last played for Panargiakos.

== Club career ==
Pejić had a spell in the Singapore Premier league with Warriors.
