= Marin Vidošević =

Croatian footballer

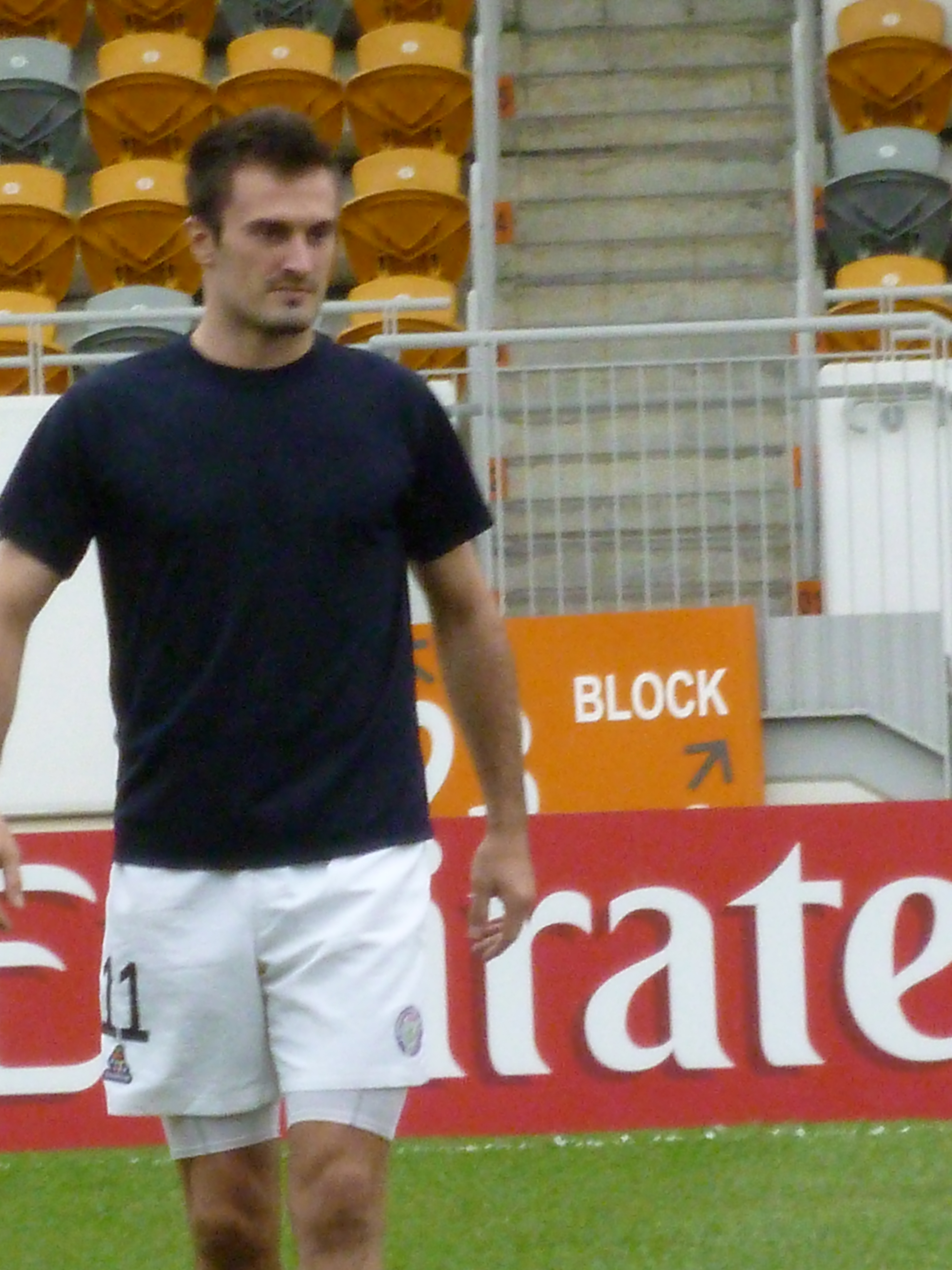

Personal information
- Full name: Marin Vidošević
- Date of birth: 9 October 1986 (age 40)
- Place of birth: Split, Croatia
- Height: 6 ft 2 in (1.88 m)
- Position: Defender

Youth career
- 1998–2002: Imotski
- 2002–2004: Hajduk Split

Senior career*
| Years | Team | Apps | (Gls) |
| 2005–2006 | Trogir | 24 | (2) |
| 2006–2007 | Imotski | 18 | (0) |
| 2007–2008 | Hrvatski Dragovoljac | 9 | (1) |
| 2008–2009 | Trogir | 19 | (3) |
| 2009–2010 | Imotski | 14 | (1) |
| 2010 | Zagreb | 1 | (0) |
| 2010–2012 | Imotski | 27 | (3) |
| 2012–2015 | Warriors | 78 | (5) |
| 2016 | Zmaj Makarska | | |
| 2017 | Teutonia | 10 | (0) |
| 2017 | Borussia Fulda | 11 | (1) |
| 2019 | Croatia Zmijavci | 3 | (0) |
- * Club domestic league appearances and goals as of 25 August 2017

Marin Vidošević (born 9 October 1986) is a Croatian footballer who currently is on a free agent.
