= Syaqir Sulaiman =

Singaporean footballer

Personal information
- Full name: Mohamad Syaqir bin Sulaiman
- Date of birth: 12 August 1986 (age 40)
- Place of birth: Singapore
- Positions: Defender; midfielder; winger

Senior career*
Years	Team	Apps	(Gls)
-2005	Tampines Rovers FC		
2006–2008	Home United FC		
2008–2010	Balestier Khalsa FC	47+	(3+)
2011–2014	Hougang United FC	70	(1)
2015–2017	Warriors FC	56	(2)
2018	Hougang United FC	4	(0)

International career
2010	Singapore	2	(0)
- * Club domestic league appearances and goals

Mohamad Syaqir bin Sulaiman (born 12 August 1986) is a Singaporean footballer.

== Career ==
As a teenager, Sulaiman overheard his parents discussing how he was the least likely of his three siblings to make it to university. After writing "You can do it. I’m going to prove father wrong" in his cupboard, Sulaiman was motivated to do well in his studies and eventually enrolled in Nanyang Technological University. While attending university, he played as a professional footballer in the Singaporean top flight and coached at two schools.
