= Nicolás Vélez =

Argentine footballer (born 1990)

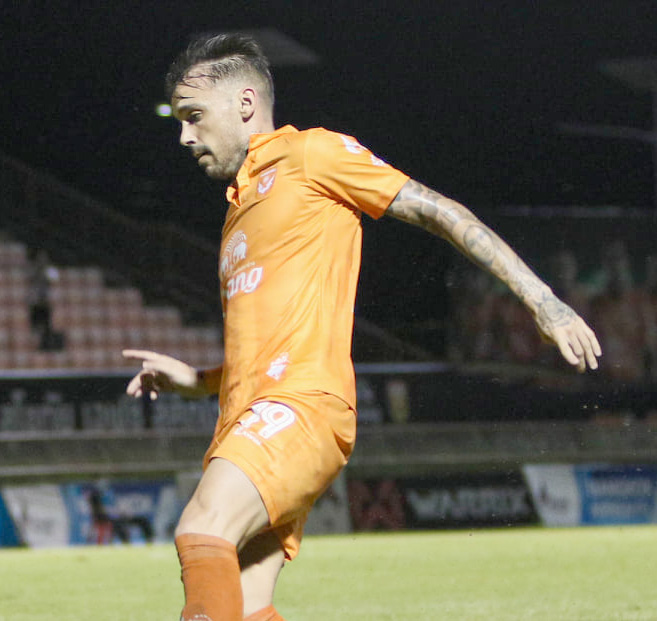

Personal information
- Full name: Nicolás Vélez
- Date of birth: 4 July 1990 (age 36)
- Place of birth: Buenos Aires, Argentina
- Height: 1.73 m (5 ft 8 in)
- Position: Forward

Youth career
- River Plate

Senior career*
Years	Team	Apps	(Gls)
2010–2012	Huracán	3	(0)
2013	Atlético Sanluqueño	8	(0)
2014–2015	Warriors	38	(29)
2015	NorthEast United	14	(5)
2016	Hajduk Split	4	(0)
2016	NorthEast United	11	(3)
2017	Suphanburi	28	(13)
2018	Negeri Sembilan	13	(8)
2018–2019	Belenenses SAD	9	(0)
2019	Felda United	7	(3)
2020	PSS Sleman	0	(0)
2020–2021	Sukhothai	9	(4)
2021–2022	Pattaya Dolphins United	8	(1)
2022–2023	Phitsanulok	11	(11)
2023	Pattaya United	18	(7)
Total		181	(84)
- * Club domestic league appearances and goals as of 20 May 2023

Nicolás Vélez (born 4 July 1990) is an Argentine professional footballer who plays as a forward.

== Club career ==
=== Early football life ===
Velez is a product of the famed River Plate youth academy having played in the same team as Erik Lamela and Roberto Pereyra, before leaving for another top-tier Argentinian team, Huracan, in search of first-team opportunities.

=== Huracán ===
Nicolás Vélez started his professional footballing career with Club Atlético Huracán at the age of 19.

=== Atlético Sanluqueño ===
After being released by his former club in Argentina, he joined Spanish 3rd tier club Atlético Sanluqueño. He left the club in 2013, saying there were “many problems” at the Spanish club, so he asked his agent to look at options elsewhere.

=== Warriors FC ===
He signed for Warriors FC in the S.League in 2014. He scored a hat-trick for the Warriors against Albirex Niigata (S) in a 4–0 victory, keeping them in contention of the title. In his first season in Singapore, he scored an impressive 21 goals in 26 appearances, second only to Brazilian Rodrigo Tosi (24 goals) helping Warriors FC to the S.League title. Velez capped his first Asian campaign by being named S.League young player of the year.

In the 2015 Singapore Charity Shield which doubled as the first league game of the 2015 season, Vélez scored the only goal of the match, winning the Shield and the first three points of the season for the Warriors. He scored two goals in the next game, a 3–1 win over Harimau Muda. He notched his sixth goal of the season on 24 April 2015 against fellow title contenders Brunei DPMM FC before earning a red card in the 69th minute following an on-field spat.

The South American also earned call-ups to Singapore Selection sides that took on Juventus, Arsenal and Stoke City in the last 18 months.

=== NorthEast United FC ===
In August 2015 Velez announced that he has decided to join Indian Super League side NorthEast United. On his joining the Indian side he said "I'm very happy to have this chance, but I'm sad to leave Warriors, because I am leaving behind many friends in Singapore.I want to say 'thank you' to my club for giving me the chance to show what I can do alongside some of the best players in the world". After debuting on 6 October 2015 he scored his first goal on the same night in 82 minute with a losing effort against Kerala Blasters. He ended the season with 5 goals, marking his name as the top goal scorer for the club.

=== Hajduk Split ===
In January 2016, Vélez joined the Croatian First Football League club Hajduk Split and signed the contract with a two and half years. He made his debut on 13 February 2016 in a 2–0 win against Slaven Belupo. On 30 June 2016, he was released from Hajduk.

=== NorthEast United FC ===
In the third season of Indian Super League, Velez made his 2nd appearance for the club and assisted Katsumi Yusa for the first winning goal against Kerala Blasters on the night of October 1, 2016 when the season officially kicked off. Velez was awarded the Hero of the Match in the 41st Match of the season between NorthEast United FC and Atlético de Kolkata.

=== Negeri Sembilan ===
Velez joined newly promoted side Negeri Sembilan for the 2018 Malaysian Super League season after leaving Suphanburi at the end of 2017. He scored his first goal when playing against fellow promoted side, Kuala Lumpur in a 2–0 home win.

=== Belenenses ===
In January 2019, he joined Belenenses.

=== PSS Sleman ===
In March 2021, it was announced that he joined PSS Sleman, and was immediately playing for the club in 2021 Menpora Cup. In May 2021, he resigned from Sleman.

=== Sukhoithai ===
In June 2021, Velez joined Sukhothai.

=== Pattaya Dolphins United ===
On 17 December 2021, Velez announced through his Instagram account that he had joined Pattaya Dolphins United.

=== Phitsanulok FC ===
In August 2022, Velez joined Phitsanulok F.C., October 2, 2022 He has scored five goals in a game against Kongkrailas United.

== Career statistics ==
=== Club ===
Appearances and goals by club, season and competition
Club	Season	League			Cup		League Cup		Continental		Other		Total	
Club	Season	Division	Apps	Goals	Apps	Goals	Apps	Goals	Apps	Goals	Apps	Goals	Apps	Goals
Huracán	2010–11	Argentine Primera División	1	0	0	0	—		—		—		1	0
Huracán	2011–12	Argentine Primera División	1	0	1	0	—		—		—		2	0
Huracán	Total		2	0	1	0	—		—		—		3	0
Atlético Sanluqueño	2012–13	Segunda División B	8	0	0	0	—		—		—		8	0
Warriors FC	2014	S.League	26	21	1	0	2	0	0	0	—		29	21
Warriors FC	2015	S.League	12	8	2	0	2	1	6 (Note: Two appearances in AFC Champions League, four appearances in AFC Cup.)	0	—		22	9
Warriors FC	Total		38	29	3	0	4	1	6	0	—		51	30
NorthEast United	2015	Indian Super League	14	5	—		—		—		—		14	5
Hajduk Split	2016–17	Croatian First Football League	4	0	—		—		0	0	—		4	0
NorthEast United	2016	Indian Super League	11	3	—		—		—		—		11	3
Suphanburi	2017	Thai League 1	28	13	4	3	0	0	—		—		32	16
Negeri Sembilan	2018	Malaysia Super League	13	8					—		—		13	8
Belenenses SAD	2018–19	Primeira Liga	6	0	—		—		—		—		6	0
Belenenses SAD	2019–20	Primeira Liga	3	0	—		0	0	—		—		3	0
Belenenses SAD	Total		9	0	—		0	0	—		—		9	0
Felda United	2020	Malaysia Super League	7	3	—		—		—		—		7	3
PSS Sleman	2021	Liga 1	0	0	—		—		—		7 (Note: Appearances in Menpora Cup.)	1	7	1
Sukhothai	2021–22	Thai League 2	9	4	1	0	—		—		—		10	4
Pattaya Dolphins United	2021–22	Thai League 3	8	1	—		—		—		—		8	1
Phitsanulok	2022–23	Thai League 3	11	11	3	2	1	2	—		—		15	15
Pattaya United	2022–23	Thai League 3	18	7	—		—		—		—		18	7
Career total			206	92	12	5	5	3	6	0	7	1	236	101

== Honours ==
=== Club ===
Warriors FC

- S.League: 2014

PSS Sleman

- Menpora Cup third place: 2021

Pattaya Dolphins United

- Thai League 3 Eastern Region: 2022–23

=== Individual ===
- S.League Young Player of the Year: 2014
