= Fazli Jaffar =

Singaporean footballer

Personal information
- Full name: Mohamed Fazli bin Jaffar
- Date of birth: 9 May 1983 (age 43)
- Place of birth: Singapore
- Positions: Midfielder; winger

Team information
- Current team: Yishun Sentek Mariners
- Number: 11

Senior career*
Years	Team	Apps	(Gls)
–2005	Home United	0	(0)
2006–2010	Gombak United	43+	(5+)
2011–2014	Hougang United	95	(5)
2015	Warriors FC	8	(0)
2015	Hougang United	12	(0)
2016–2017	Warriors FC	24	(3)
2018–2020	Yishun Sentek Mariners	0	(0)
2022	Warwick Knights	0	(0)
2024–	Yishun Sentek Mariners	0	(0)
- * Club domestic league appearances and goals

Fazli Jaffar (born 9 May 1983 in Singapore) is a Singaporean footballer who plays as a midfielder for National Football League club Yishun Sentek Mariners.
