= Miroslav Krištić =

Croatian footballer (born 1990)

Personal information
- Full name: Miroslav Krištić
- Date of birth: 14 February 1990 (age 36)
- Place of birth: Imotski, Croatia
- Height: 1.73 m (5 ft 8 in)
- Position: Forward

Team information
- Current team: Kamen Ivanbegovina

Senior career*
Years	Team	Apps	(Gls)
2012	Imotski	12	(5)
2012	Kamen Ivanbegovina		
2013-2014	Imotski	8	(2)
2015–2016	Balestier Khalsa	46	(21)
2017	Imotski	8	(3)
2017	SV Würmla	12	(8)
2018	Urania		
2018-2019	Kamen Ivanbegovina		
2010-2020	Zmaj Makarska		
2020	Imotski		
2020-	Kamen Ivanbegovina		
- * Club domestic league appearances and goals as of 3 November 2017

Miroslav Krištić (born February 14, 1990) is a Croatian footballer, who is currently playing for Croatian lower league club Kamen Ivanbegovina.

== Club career ==
=== NK Imotski ===
Krištić started his career with local club NK Imotski, scoring 2 goals in 14 appearances for his club

=== Balestier Khalsa ===
Following recommendations from former Singaporean International Mirko Grabovac, Krištić was signed by the Tigers from NK Imotski in the Croatian third division.

He later had a spell at Austrian fourth tier-side SV Würmla.
