= Alex Weaver =

English football manager

Personal information
- Full name: Alexander Weaver
- Place of birth: Stoke-on-Trent, England

Team information
- Current team: Bristol Rovers (academy manager)

Managerial career
- Years: Team
- 2013: Hougang United
- 2013–2015: Warriors FC
- 2016–2017: Yverdon Sport (Academy Manager)
- 2017–2018: FC Lausanne Sport (Assistant)
- 2018: FC Lausanne Sport (Interim)
- 2018–2019: Team Vaud U21
- 2019–2020: GC Zurich (U18 Manager)
- 2020–2021: FC Basel (Academy Manager)
- 2021–2022: Team Vaud U18
- 2022–2024: Yverdon Sport (Assistant)

Alex Weaver is an English UEFA Pro Licence football manager. He is currently academy manager at EFL League Two club Bristol Rovers.

== Career ==
Weaver began coaching at 17 years old when he passed the English FA Coaching Certificate (Now FA Level 2 in Football Coaching). Having played youth football at Stoke City, Port Vale, Staffordshire U19s and then advancing into the semi-professional ranks of the North West Counties League, he began to develop his coaching experience as a youth coach at local North West Counties club, Newcastle Town FC.

In between completing the UEFA B and UEFA A coaching certificates, he attained a BSc Coaching Science Degree at Liverpool John Moores University. Aged 28, he began working full-time for Manchester United Soccer Schools, coaching in places such as Seattle, Paris, Dubai, South Africa and India. He returned to Seattle to coach Seattle Wolves FC for 18 months as they prepared to participate in the USL Second Division but the club could not manage to attain the financial support to compete in the league. Hired by Highline Premier FC, one of Washington's premier youth clubs, Weaver went on to develop HPFC's playing and coach development programs for three years before leaving the US to develop his career in Singapore.

He was appointed head coach of Hougang United, a club in the S. League in early 2013. After only five months, Weaver resigned from his job, and was later appointed as head coach of rival Warriors FC in June 2013, replacing V. Selvaraj. He went on to guide the club to the S-League title in his first full year as head coach. In February, Warriors FC started the 2015 campaign with Asian Champions League qualifiers against Yadanarbon FC and Chinese Super League side, Guangzhou Evergrande.

Weaver has developed a reputation for his methodical planning and preparation of teams, and has regularly discussed the 'periodisation' of football conditioning methods of Raymond Verheijen in the local media, and its influence on his own coaching practice.

He left Warriors FC by mutual consent in October 2015, and joined the Singapore office of leading British sports production and media company, Sunset+Vine in January 2016, to write for its digital publication, VoxSports. In May 2016, Weaver attained the UEFA Pro Licence following completion of the final course module, in which candidates were to compile a research study on a topic of their choice. Weaver completed a 10,000 word study on 'Leadership Hierarchies in Southeast Asian Football' and presented it at the English Football Association to gain his award. In August 2016, he began working within the academy at FC Lausanne Sport in Switzerland.

In June 2023 he led Yverdon Sport to promotion and a place in the Swiss Super League.

In November 2026, Weaver returned to England, joining Bristol Rovers as academy manager.

== Honours ==
=== Managerial ===
In one full season of club management, Weaver led his club to win the domestic league.

Warriors FC

S.League: 2014

== Journalism career ==
After leaving Warriors, Weaver joined Sunset+Vine Asia (Digital) as a full-time journalist for VoxSports in January 2016, where he has been writing commentaries and articles on football for the digital news organisation.
