= 2018 Home United FC season =

Home United
2018 season
- Chairman: Anselm Lopez
- Head coach: Aidil Sharin
- Stadium: Bishan Stadium
- Top goalscorer: League: Shahril Ishak (13); All: Song Ui-young (20)
Home colours	Away colours

The 2018 season was Home United's 23rd consecutive season in the top flight of Singapore football and in the S.League. Along with the S.League, the club also competed in the Prime League, the Singapore Cup, and the Singapore League Cup.

== Key events ==
=== Pre-season ===
1. On 15/10/2017, it was reported that key striker, Stipe Plazibat, is looking for a move to Thailand with Bangkok Glass interested.
2. On 7/11/2017, Irfan Fandi revealed in an interview that he is looking to make an overseas move once he finishes National Service (NS) next February.
3. On 7/11/2017, coach Aidil Sharin is rumored to be courted by MSL clubs, namely Felda United, PKNS FC and Kelantan. He was said to have met up Felda United and will be meeting Kelantan management before end of season.
4. On 21/11/2017, it was reported that Harris had returned to JDT.
5. On 28/11/2017, Tsubasa Sano from Albirex Niigata (S) or Darryl Roberts from Global Cebu F.C. or Fernando Rodríguez from Ceres–Negros F.C. are identified as the replacement for top scorer, Stipe Plazibat.
6. On 29/11/2017, Bangkok Glass make offer for Irfan Fandi for 2018 season. However, he is still considering the offer as he is looking to move to Europe.
7. On 2/12/2017, Faris Ramli is reported to have rejected a move to Malaysia club to sign a one-year extension to his contract. However, he is reported to have negotiated a deal with Selangor FA for the new season as his new contract with Home United contained a clause for him to leave.
8. On 14/12/2017, Irfan Fandi & his brother, Ikhsan Fandi will go trial with English Championship club, Leeds United in March 2018.
9. On 15/12/2017, Stipe Plazibat reportedly completed his move to Thailand.
10. On 15/12/2017, Adam Swandi was reported to be close to a move to White Swan, dealing a blow to the team for the 2018 season.

=== In-season ===
1. On 9/8/2018, the team was crowned as AFC Cup ASEAN Zonal winners after defeating Philippines’ Ceres Negros 3–1 on aggregate over two legs.
2. On 26/9/2018, it was reported that Geylang International is interested in bringing Song Ui-young to Bedok Stadium together with their former coach, Lee Lim Saeng for Season 2019. Joining the Eagles to express interest is Indonesian giants Persija Jakarta.
3. On 26/9/2018, it was reported that Aidil Shahril is courted by Perak FA for 2019 while their former coach Lee Lim Saeng is also a target for Warriors FC.

== Squad ==
=== S.League squad ===
As of 26 January 2017.

Squad No.	Name	Nationality	Date of birth (age)	Previous club	Contract since	Contract end
Goalkeepers
1	Kenji Syed Rusydi ^{U23}	(Singapore)	12 July 1998 (age 28)	Youth Team	2017	
22	Eko Pradana Putra	(Singapore)	14 April 1993 (age 33)	(Singapore) Geylang International	2016	
24	Rudy Khairullah	(Singapore)	19 July 1994 (age 32)	(Singapore) Police SA (NFL D1)	2017	
Defenders
2	Shakir Hamzah	(Singapore)	20 October 1992 (age 34)	(Singapore) Tampines Rovers	2018	2018
4	Juma'at Jantan ^{>30}	(Singapore)	23 February 1984 (age 42)	(Singapore) LionsXII	2013	2019
6	Abdil Qaiyyim Mutalib	(Singapore)	14 May 1989 (age 37)	(Singapore) Tampines Rovers	2015	2018
9	Faritz Abdul Hameed	(Singapore)	16 January 1990 (age 36)	(Singapore) Geylang International	2018	2018
15	Faizal Roslan ^{U23}	(Singapore)	30 May 1995 (age 31)	(Singapore) Young Lions FC	2018	2018
18	Shahrin Saberin ^{U23}	(Singapore)	14 February 1995 (age 31)	(Singapore) Young Lions FC	2018	2018
	Ribiyanda Saswadimata ^{U19}	(Singapore)	5 February 2000 (age 26)		2018	2018
Midfielders
3	Anumanthan Kumar	(Singapore)	14 July 1994 (age 32)	(Singapore) Hougang United	2017	2019
7	Aqhari Abdullah	(Singapore)	9 July 1991 (age 35)	(Singapore) LionsXII	2016	2018
8	Song Ui-young	(South Korea)	8 November 1993 (age 33)	Youth Team	2012	2018
13	Izzdin Shafiq (Captain)	(Singapore)	14 December 1990 (age 35)	(Singapore) Tampines Rovers	2017	2018
14	Fazli Ayob	(Singapore)	24 January 1990 (age 36)	(Singapore) Tampines Rovers	2018	2018
16	Muhelmy Suhaimi ^{U23}	(Singapore)	22 January 1996 (age 30)	(Singapore) Young Lions FC	2018	2018
19	Hafiz Nor	(Singapore)	22 August 1988 (age 38)	(Singapore) Warriors FC	2018	2018
20	Arshad Shamim ^{U23}	(Singapore)	9 December 1999 (age 26)	Youth Team	2018	2018
21	Suhairi Sabri ^{U23}	(Singapore)	23 April 1996 (age 30)	Youth Team	2018	2018
23	Christopher van Huizen	(Singapore)	28 November 1992 (age 33)	(Singapore) Young Lions FC	2018	2018
32	Isaka Cernak	(Australia)	9 April 1989 (age 37)	(Thailand) Sisaket	2018	2018
Strikers
5	Amy Recha	(Singapore)	13 May 1992 (age 34)	(Singapore) Geylang International	2018	2018
10	Amiruldin Asraf ^{U23}	(Singapore)	8 January 1997 (age 29)	Youth Team	2017	2018
12	Iqram Rifqi ^{U23}	(Singapore)	25 February 1996 (age 30)	Youth Team	2017	2018
17	Shahril Ishak ^{>30}	(Singapore)	23 January 1984 (age 42)	(Singapore) Warriors FC	2018	2018
Players loaned out / placed on injury list / left during season
11	Sirina Camara	(France)	12 April 1991 (age 35)	(Singapore) Etoile FC	2013	2018

== Coaching staff ==
Source
Position	Name	Ref.
Head coach	(Singapore) Aidil Sharin	
Assistant coach	(Singapore) Saswadimata Dasuki	
Goalkeeping coach	(Singapore) Adi Saleh	
General Manager	(Singapore) Badri Ghent	
Team manager		
Physiotherapist	(Singapore) Daisy Sumampong Anarna	
Kitman		

== Transfer ==
=== Pre-season transfer ===
==== In ====
Position	Player	Transferred From	Ref
DF	(Singapore) Shahrin Saberin	(Singapore) Garena Young Lions	loan return
DF	(Singapore) Faizal Roslan	(Singapore) Garena Young Lions	
DF	(Singapore) Shakir Hamzah	(Singapore) Tampines Rovers	1 Year contract
DF	(Singapore) Faritz Hameed	(Singapore) Geylang International	
MF	(Singapore) Hafiz Nor	(Singapore) Warriors FC	
MF	(Singapore) Fazli Ayob	(Singapore) Tampines Rovers	
MF	(Singapore) Amy Recha	(Singapore) Geylang International	
MF	(Singapore) Muhelmy Suhaimi	(Singapore) Garena Young Lions	
FW	(Singapore) Shahril Ishak	(Singapore) Warriors FC	1 Year Contract

==== Out ====
Position	Player	Transferred To	Ref
GK	(Singapore) Hassan Sunny	(Thailand) Army United	
GK	(Singapore) Hafiz Ahmad	(Singapore) Balestier Khalsa	
DF	(Singapore) Khalili Khalif	(Singapore) Balestier Khalsa	
DF	(Singapore) Haziq Azman	(Singapore) Eunos Crescent FC (NFL Club)	
DF	(Singapore) Afiq Yunos	(Singapore) Tampines Rovers	
DF	(Singapore) Sufianto Salleh	(Singapore) Balestier Khalsa	
DF	(Singapore) Irfan Fandi	(Singapore) Garena Young Lions	
MF	(Singapore) Shamil Sharif	(Singapore) Warriors FC	
MF	(Singapore) Hariss Harun	(Malaysia) Johor Darul Ta'zim F.C.	Loan Ended
MF	(Singapore) Faris Ramli	(Malaysia) PKNS	
MF	(Singapore) Adam Swandi	(Japan) Albirex Niigata (S)	
MF	(Singapore) Noor Akid Nordin	(Singapore) Balestier Khalsa	
MF	(Singapore) Luqman Ismail	(Singapore)	
FW	(Singapore) Akbar Shah	(Singapore) Balestier Khalsa	
FW	(Croatia) Stipe Plazibat	(Thailand) Bangkok Glass	
FW	(Croatia) Marijan Šuto	(Germany) TSV Essingen	
FW	(Singapore) Khairul Nizam	(Singapore) Warriors FC	
FW	(Singapore) Shah Zulkarnean	Singapore Cricket Club FC (NFL Club)	

Note 1: Khairul Nizam was reported to have been retained by the club but subsequently transferred to Warriors FC.

Note 2: Faris Ramli was reported to have signed an extension of contract but subsequently moved to PKNS FC after a clause was included in his new contract.

==== Retained ====
Position	Player	Ref
DF	(Singapore) Juma'at Jantan	2 years contract signed in 2017
DF	(France) Sirina Camara	2 years contract signed in 2017
DF	(Singapore) Abdil Qaiyyim Mutalib	
MF	(South Korea) Song Ui-young	2 years contract signed in 2017
MF	(Singapore) Anumanthan Kumar	NS till 2019
FW	(Singapore) Khairul Nizam	2 years contract signed in 2017
FW	(Singapore) Amiruldin Asraf	2 years contract signed in 2017

==== Extension ====
Position	Player	Ref
GK	(Singapore) Rudy Khairullah	
GK	(Singapore) Eko Pradana Putra	
MF	(Singapore) Izzdin Shafiq	
MF	(Singapore) Faris Ramli	1 Year Contract
MF	(Singapore) Aqhari Abdullah	
MF	(Singapore) Christopher van Huizen	1 Year Contract

==== Promoted ====
Position	Player	Ref
GK	(Singapore) Kenji Syed Rusydi	
MF	(Singapore) Arshad Shamim	
MF	(Singapore) Suhairi Sabri	
FW	(Singapore) Iqram Rifqi	

==== Trial ====
===== Trial (In) =====
Position	Player	Trial From	Ref
MF	(Australia) Isaka Cernak	Free Agent	
MF	(Brazil) Andrezinho	Free Agent	
MF	(France) Paulin Maguette M'Baye	Free Agent	

===== Trial (Out) =====
Position	Player	Trial @	Ref
DF	(Singapore) Abdil Qaiyyim Mutalib	(Thailand) Khonkaen FC	

=== Mid-season transfers ===
==== In ====
Position	Player	Transferred From	Ref
MF	(Australia) Isaka Cernak	Free Agent	

==== Extension ====
Position	Player	Ref
DF	(Singapore) Juma’at Jantan	2 Years Contract

== Friendlies ==
=== Pre-season friendlies ===
Win Draw Loss

7 February 2018 1	Home United (Singapore)	0–1	(Singapore) Jungfrau Punggol FC (NFL Club)	Clementi Stadium
		Report

=== PSM Makassar Super Cup Asia 2018 ===
19 January 2018 Semi Final	PSM Makassar (Indonesia)	4–0	(Singapore) Home United	Andi Mattalata Stadium, Makassar
	Guy Junior 13', 62'; Marc Klok 45+2' (pen.); Zulham Zamrun 86'

21 January 2018 3rd place playoff	Adelaide United Youth (Australia)	0–1	(Singapore) Home United	Andi Mattalata Stadium, Makassar
			Song Ui-young 70'

=== KL Pre-season tour ===
24 January 2018 1	MISC-MIFA (Malaysia)	5–1	(Singapore) Home United	Petaling Jaya Stadium
	Derko 5'; Rajesh Perumal 11'; Mugenthirran Ganesan 53'; Beomguen 69'; Kpah Sherman 80'		Hafiz Nor 73'

27 January 2018 2	Negeri Sembilan FA (Malaysia)	2–0	(Singapore) Home United	Stadium Maybank Bangi
	Fakhrul Aiman Sidid; Renārs Rode

== Team statistics ==
=== Appearances and goals ===
As of 6 October 2018.

No.	Pos.	Player	Sleague		Singapore Cup		AFC Cup		Total	
No.	Pos.	Player	Apps.	Goals	Apps.	Goals	Apps.	Goals	Apps.	Goals
1	GK	(Singapore) Kenji Syed Rusydi	4	0	3	0	0	0	7	0
2	DF	(Singapore) Shakir Hamzah	21	3	5	0	10	1	36	4
3	MF	(Singapore) Anumanthan Kumar	13(6)	1	3(1)	0	10(1)	2	34	3
4	DF	(Singapore) Juma'at Jantan	4(1)	0	0	0	8	0	13	0
5	FW	(Singapore) Amy Recha	5(11)	2	0(3)	0	3(3)	0	25	2
6	MF	(Singapore) Abdil Qaiyyim	15	0	4	0	9	0	28	0
7	MF	(Singapore) Aqhari Abdullah	16(1)	0	2(2)	0	11	0	32	0
8	MF	(South Korea) Song Ui-young	11(2)	10	3	1	11	9	27	20
9	DF	(Singapore) Faritz Hameed	12(6)	2	3(1)	1	10(1)	2	33	5
10	FW	(Singapore) Amiruldin Asraf	6(10)	0	1	0	0(3)	0	20	0
12	FW	(Singapore) Iqram Rifqi	12(4)	2	4(1)	1	0(1)	0	22	3
13	MF	(Singapore) Izzdin Shafiq	21(2)	2	3(1)	0	10	1	37	3
14	MF	(Singapore) Fazli Ayob	3(2)	1	1(3)	0	4(4)	0	17	1
15	DF	(Singapore) Faizal Roslan	24	2	5	0	9(1)	1	39	3
16	MF	(Singapore) Muhelmy Suhaimi	0(2)	0	0(1)	0	1	0	4	0
17	FW	(Singapore) Shahril Ishak	22(1)	13	5	2	12	5	40	19
18	DF	(Singapore) Shahrin Saberin	12(1)	0	1	0	2(4)	0	20	0
19	MF	(Singapore) Hafiz Nor	17(6)	7	5	1	2(8)	1	38	9
20	MF	(Singapore) Arshad Shamim	11	0	1	0	0	0	12	0
21	MF	(Singapore) Suhairi Sabri	3(1)	0	0	0	0	0	4	0
22	GK	(Singapore) Eko Pradana Putra	2	0	1	0	2	0	5	0
23	MF	(Singapore) Christopher van Huizen	2(10)	0	1	0	2(3)	0	18	0
24	GK	(Singapore) Rudy Khairullah	18	0	1	0	10	0	29	0
32	MF	(Australia) Isaka Cernak	4	0	4(1)	1	4	1	13	2
43	DF	(Singapore) Danial Hakim	0	0	0	0	0	0	0	0
Players who have played this season and/or sign for the season but had left the club or on loan to other club
11	DF	(France) Sirina Camara	3(4)	2	0	0	2(3)	0	12	2

== Competitions ==
=== Overview ===
Competition	Record							
Competition	P	W	D	L	GF	GA	GD	Win %
S.League	24	12	7	5	48	36	+12	50.00
AFC Cup	12	7	2	3	25	21	+4	58.33
Singapore Cup	5	1	1	3	8	9	−1	20.00
Total	41	20	10	11	81	66	+15	48.78

=== Singapore Premier League ===
Win Draw Loss

4 April 2018 1	Home United (Singapore)	3–1	(Singapore) Balestier Khalsa	Bishan Stadium
	Sirina Camara 77'; Song Ui-young 88'; Shahril Ishak 90+3'		Keegan Linderboom 27' (pen.)

7 April 2018 2	Brunei DPMM FC	4–2	(Singapore) Home United	Bandar Seri Begawan, Brunei
	Volodymyr Pryyomov 13', 54'; Abdul Aziz Tamit 15'; Mojtaba Esmaeilzadeh 71'		Haimie Anak Nyaring 73' (o.g.); Shahril Ishak 90+2'	Stadium: Hassanal Bolkiah National Stadium; Referee: Jansen Foo (Singapore)

18 April 2018 3	Home United (Singapore)	1–6	(Singapore) Albirex Niigata (S)	Bishan Stadium
	Shahril Ishak 90' (pen.)		Shuhei Hoshino 8', 20'; Taku Morinaga 53'; Wataru Murofushi 69'; Daiki Asaoka 72'; Adam Swandi 90+4'

22 April 2018 4	Geylang International (Singapore)	1–4	(Singapore) Home United	Bedok Stadium
	Shawal Anuar 49'; Fairoz Hassan (yellow card) 11'; Darren Teh (yellow card) 90+3'		Hafiz Nor 2', 24'; Shahril Ishak 36'; Faizal Roslan 45+1'

2 May 2018 5	Hougang United (Singapore)	3–3	(Singapore) Home United	Hougang Stadium
	Iqbal Hussain 57'; Adam Mitter 74'; Faiz Salleh 78'		Song Ui-young 34'; Faritz Abdul Hameed 40' (yellow card) 44'; Shahril Ishak 65'; Anumanthan Kumar (yellow card) 13'; Hafiz Nor (yellow card) 67'

5 May 2018 6	Home United (Singapore)	3–3	(Singapore) Warriors FC	Bishan Stadium
	Song Ui-young 14', 85' (pen.); Faizal Roslan 83'; Shakir Hamzah (yellow card) 68'		Ho Wai Loon 2'; Jonathan Béhé 82' 90+4'; Hafiz Sulaiman (yellow card) 13'; Firdaus Kasman (yellow card) 55'; Emmeric Ong (yellow card) 84'

26 June 2018 7 (Rescheduled)	Tampines Rovers (Singapore)	1–0	(Singapore) Home United	Our Tampines Hub
	Amirul Adli 46'			Referee: Ahmad A'Qashah (Singapore)

19 May 2018 8	Balestier Khalsa (Singapore)	2–1	(Singapore) Home United	Singapore National Stadium
	Vedran Mesec 87'; Huzaifah Aziz 90+1'		Hafiz Nor 9'; Anumanthan Kumar (red card) 90+5'	Referee: Muhammad Zulfiqar (Singapore)

26 May 2018 9	Home United (Singapore)	3–1	Brunei DPMM	Bishan Stadium
	Shakir Hamzah 10'; Song Ui-young 34'; Song Ui-young 75'		Adi Said 30'

6 June 2018 10	Home United (Singapore)	4–1	(Singapore) Garena Young Lions	Bishan Stadium
	Shakir Hamzah 2'; Iqram Rifqi 45'; Song Ui-young 55' (pen.); Izzdin Shafiq 85'		Amirul Hakim 15'	Referee: Ahmad A'Qashah (Singapore)

9 June 2018 11	Albirex Niigata (S) (Singapore)	3–0	(Singapore) Home United	Jurong East Stadium
	Shuhei Hoshino 52', 84'; Kenya Takahashi 58'			Referee: Jansen Foo (Singapore)

17 June 2018 12	Home United (Singapore)	2–0	(Singapore) Geylang International	Bishan Stadium
	Amy Recha 47'; Shahril Ishak 89'; Anumanthan Kumar (yellow card) 33'; Shakir Hamzah (yellow card) 51'

23 June 2018 13	Garena Young Lions (Singapore)	1–1	(Singapore) Home United	Singapore National Stadium
	Haiqal Pashia 6'; Zulqarnaen Suzliman (red card) 73'		Iqram Rifqi 89'

1 July 2018 14	Home United (Singapore)	1–0	(Singapore) Hougang United	Jalan Besar Stadium
	Anumanthan Kumar 57'; Shakir Hamzah (yellow card) 43'		Syahiran Miswan (yellow card) 8'	Referee: Y.Sathyakumar (Singapore)

4 July 2018 15	Warriors FC (Singapore)	0–2	(Singapore) Home United	Choa Chu Kang Stadium
			Izzdin Shafiq 51'; Shahril Ishak 76'

8 July 2018 16	Home United (Singapore)	0–0	(Singapore) Tampines Rovers	Jalan Besar Stadium
				Referee: Muhammad Taqi Aljaafari Bin Jahari (Singapore)

11 July 2018 17	Home United (Singapore)	2–0	(Singapore) Garena Young Lions	Jalan Besar Stadium
	Shahril Ishak (penalty missed) 12; Amy Recha 19'; Hafiz Nor 27'

15 July 2018 18	Home United (Singapore)	1–1	(Singapore) Balestier Khalsa	Jalan Besar Stadium
	Shahril Ishak 42' (pen.)		Fadil Kamis 16'	Referee: G.Letchman (Singapore)

21 July 2018 19	Brunei DPMM	1–2	(Singapore) Home United	Bandar Seri Begawan, Brunei
	Brian McLean 80'; Adi Said (yellow card) 75'; Volodymyr Pryyomov (yellow card) 89'		Hafiz Nor 45'; Shahril Ishak 47'; Arshad Shamim (yellow card) 82'	Stadium: Hassanal Bolkiah National Stadium; Referee: W. Ravisanthiran (Singapore)

12 August 2018 20 (Rescheduled)	Home United (Singapore)	1–1	(Singapore) Albirex Niigata (S)	Bishan Stadium
	Shahril Ishak 48'		Taku Morinaga (penalty missed) 10; Wataru Murofushi 90+4'; Shuhei Sasahara (yellow card) 76'	Referee: Ahmad A'Qashah (Singapore)

15 August 2018 21	Geylang International (Singapore)	1–5	(Singapore) Home United	Bedok Stadium
	Darren Teh 87'		Faritz Hameed 40'; Shakir Hamzah 27'; Shahril Ishak 56' 61'; Hafiz Nor 58'	Referee: Muhammad Taqi Aljaafari Bin Jahari (Singapore)

15 September 2018 22 (Rescheduled)	Hougang United (Singapore)	1–2	(Singapore) Home United	Hougang Stadium
	Shahfiq Ghani 62'		Hafiz Nor 34'; Song Ui-young 84'

23 September 2018 23	Home United (Singapore)	4–3	(Singapore) Warriors FC	Bishan Stadium
	Song Ui-young 10' 50' 80' (pen.); Faritz Abdul Hameed 73'		Khairul Nizam 17' (pen.) 42'; Ignatius Ang 71'; Ho Wai Loon (yellow card) 68'; Emmeric Ong (yellow card) 80'	Referee: W. Ravisanthiran (Singapore)

29 September 2018 24 (Rescheduled)	Tampines Rovers (Singapore)	1–1	(Singapore) Home United	Our Tampines Hub
	Khairul Amri 72' (pen.); Madhu Mohana (yellow card) 20'; Shameer Aziq (yellow card) 20'; Shah Shahiran (yellow card) 90+5'		Shahril Ishak 77'; Song Ui-Young (penalty missed); Iqram Rifqi (yellow card) 40'; Abdil Qaiyyim (yellow card) 71'	Referee: Muhammad Taqi Aljaafari Bin Jahari (Singapore)

Pos	Team	Pld	W	D	L	GF	GA	GD	Pts	Qualification or relegation
1	Albirex Niigata (S) (Note: The two foreign clubs – Albirex Niigata (S) and DPMM FC – as well as the Football Association of Singapore (FAS) under-21 team, Young Lions, are ineligible for any AFC competition spots.) (C)	24	21	3	0	69	17	+52	66	
2	Home United	24	12	7	5	48	36	+12	43	Qualification to AFC Champions League Preliminary Round 1
3	DPMM FC	24	11	8	5	46	38	+8	41	
4	Tampines Rovers	24	12	4	8	43	27	+16	40	Qualification to AFC Cup Group Stage
5	Warriors FC	24	7	7	10	32	35	−3	28	

Updated to match(es) played on 29 September 2018. Source: Singapore Premier League
Rules for classification: 1) points; 2) goal difference; 3) number of goals scored; 4) number of wins
(C) Champions

=== AFC Cup ===
Pos	Team	Pld	W	D	L	GF	GA	GD	Pts	Qualification	HOM	CER	BKA	SHA
1	(Singapore) Home United	6	4	1	1	15	6	+9	13 (Note: Head-to-head results: Home United 1–1 Ceres–Negros, Ceres–Negros 0–2 Home United.)	Zonal semi-finals	—	1–1	6–0	3–2
2	(Philippines) Ceres–Negros	6	4	1	1	17	3	+14	13	Zonal semi-finals	0–2	—	9–0	2–0
3	(Cambodia) Boeung Ket Angkor	6	2	0	4	8	24	−16	6		3–2	0–4	—	1–2
4	(Myanmar) Shan United	6	1	0	5	5	12	−7	3		0–1	0–1	1–4	—

Source: AFC
Rules for classification: Group stage tiebreakers
Notes:

Win Draw Loss

==== Group stage ====
13 February 2018 Matchday 1	Shan United (Myanmar)	0–1	(Singapore) Home United	Yangon, Myanmar
	Htike Htike Aung (yellow card) 57'; Chit Su Moe (yellow card) 85'		Song Ui-young 75'; Abdil Qaiyyim Mutalib (yellow card) 86'; Rudy Khairullah (yellow card) 90+3'	Stadium: Thuwunna Stadium; Attendance: 500; Referee: Mongkolchai Pechsri (Thailand)

27 February 2018 Matchday 2	Home United (Singapore)	1–1	(Philippines) Ceres–Negros	Singapore
	Shahril Ishak 23' (pen.); Sirina Camara (yellow card) 9' (yellow card) 49' (yellow-red card); Faizal Roslan (yellow card) 67'; Shakir Hamzah (yellow card) 80'		Bienvenido Marañón (penalty missed); Manuel Herrera 79'; Omid Nazari (yellow card) 75'; Jeffrey Christiaens (yellow card) 90+6'	Stadium: Jalan Besar Stadium; Attendance: 1,331; Referee: Shaun Evans (Australia)

6 March 2018 Matchday 3	Boeung Ket Angkor (Cambodia)	3–2	(Singapore) Home United	Phnom Penh, Cambodia
	Maycon Calijuri 12', 41' (pen.); Samuel Ajayi 13'; Sun Sovanrithy (yellow card) 68'		Song Ui-young 2'; Faritz Abdul Hameed 67' (yellow card) 68'	Stadium: Phnom Penh Olympic Stadium; Attendance: 626; Referee: Masoud Tufayelieh (Syria)

14 March 2018 Matchday 4	Home United (Singapore)	6–0	(Cambodia) Boeung Ket Angkor	Singapore
	Shahril Ishak 37'; Song Ui-young 42'; Faritz Abdul Hameed 55'; Anumanthan Kumar 72', 83'; Izzdin Shafiq 86'; Abdil Qaiyyim Mutalib (yellow card) 28'		Samuel Ajayi (red card) 81'	Stadium: Jalan Besar Stadium; Attendance: 767; Referee: Yu Ming-hsun (Chinese Taipei)

11 April 2018 Matchday 5	Home United (Singapore)	3–2	(Myanmar) Shan United	Singapore
	Faizal Roslan 19'; Song Ui-young 25'; Shahril Ishak 39'	Report	Zin Min Tun 9'; Christopher Chizoba 28'	Stadium: Jalan Besar Stadium; Attendance: 1,015; Referee: Kim Woo-sung (South Korea)

25 April 2018 Matchday 6	Ceres–Negros (Philippines)	0–2	(Singapore) Home United	Bacolod, Philippines
			Izzdin Shafiq 80'; Song Ui-young 90+4' (pen.)	Stadium: Panaad Park and Stadium; Attendance: 5,015; Referee: Hussein Abo Yehia (Lebanon)

==== Knockout stage ====
8 May 2018 Zonal Semi-final 1st leg	Home United (Singapore)	3–2	(Indonesia) Persija Jakarta	Singapore
19:30 SST	Maman Abdurrahman 2' (o.g.); Song Ui-young 9'; Hafiz Nor 79'; Aqhari Abdullah (yellow card) 33'	Report	Ramdani Lestaluhu 32', 49'; Sandi Darma Sute (yellow card) 43'	Stadium: Jalan Besar Stadium; Attendance: 1,528; Referee: Mooud Bonyadifar (Iran)

15 May 2018 Zonal Semi-final 2nd leg	Persija Jakarta (Indonesia)	1–3 (3–6 agg.)	(Singapore) Home United	Jakarta, Indonesia
19:30 WIB	Marko Šimić 9' (pen.); Jaimerson Xavier (yellow card) 11' (yellow card) 37' (yellow-red card); Daryono (red card) 45'; Rohit Chand (yellow card) 65'	Report	Shahril Ishak 6', 12'; Song 44'; M.Anumanthan (yellow card) 39'; Sirina Camara (yellow card) 62'; Rudy Khairullah (yellow card) 76'	Stadium: Gelora Bung Karno Stadium; Attendance: 62,198; Referee: Turki Al-Khudhayr (Saudi Arabia)

Home United won 6–3 on aggregate.

1 August 2018 Zonal Final 1st leg	Ceres–Negros (Philippines)	1–1	(Singapore) Home United	Bacolod, Philippines
19:30 PST	Blake Powell 8' (pen.); Patrick Reichelt (yellow card) 43'	Report	Isaka Cernak 23'; Abdil Qaiyyim (yellow card) 83'; Amiruldin Asyraf (yellow card) 90+6'	Stadium: Panaad Park and Stadium; Attendance: 6,705; Referee: Kim Woo-sung (South Korea)

8 August 2018 Zonal Final 2nd leg	Home United (Singapore)	2–0 (3–1 agg.)	(Philippines) Ceres–Negros	Singapore
19:30 SST	Shakir Hamzah 62'; Song Ui-young 74'; Shahrin Saberin (yellow card) 81'	Report	Súper (yellow card) 69'	Stadium: Jalan Besar Stadium; Attendance: 3,392; Referee: Sivakorn Pu-udom (Thailand)

Home United won 3–1 on aggregate.

21 August 2018 Inter-zone Semi-final 1st leg	Home United (Singapore)	0–2	(North Korea) April 25	Singapore
SST	Faritz Hameed (yellow card) 89'	Report	Pak Myong-song 62'; An Il-bom 81'; An Tae-Song (yellow card) 78'; Sim Hyon-Jin (yellow card) 79'; Kwon Chung-Hyok (yellow card) 89'	Stadium: Jalan Besar Stadium; Attendance: 2,856; Referee: Khamis Al-Marri (Qatar)

28 August 2018 Inter-zone Semi-final 2nd leg	April 25 (North Korea)	9–1 (11–1 agg.)	(Singapore) Home United	Pyongyang, North Korea
17:00 PYT	Om Chol-song 23'; Rim Chol-min 30' 40' 45+2' (pen.); An Il-bom 51' (pen.) 65'; Han Song-hyok 61'; Son Phyong-il 79'; Yun Il-gwang 84'	Report	Song Ui-young 19'	Stadium: Kim Il-sung Stadium; Attendance: 3,000; Referee: Yaqoob Abdul Baki (Oman)

Home United lost 1–11 on aggregate.

=== Singapore Cup ===
Win Draw Loss

27 July 2018 Quarter Final 1st Leg	Home United (Singapore)	1–2	(Singapore) Tampines Rovers	Jalan Besar Stadium
	Shahril Ishak 61'		Khairul Amri 45+1'; Jordan Webb 85'; Yasir Hanapi (yellow card) 90' (yellow-red card)	Referee: Muhammad Taqi Aljaafari Bin Jahari (Singapore)

19 September 2018 Quarter Final 2nd Leg	Tampines Rovers (Singapore)	1–3 (3–4 agg.)	(Singapore) Home United	Our Tampines Hub
	Khairul Amri 45'; Daniel Bennett (yellow card) 86'; Syazwan Buhari (red card) 90+4'		Song Ui-young 21'; Iqram Rifqi 34'; Shahril Ishak 71'; Izzdin Shafiq (yellow card) 83'	Referee: Nathan Chan (Singapore)

Home United won 4–3 on aggregate.

26 September 2018 Semi Final 1st Leg	Albirex Niigata (S) (Singapore)	3–2	(Singapore) Home United	Jurong East Stadium
	Adam Swandi 12'; Wataru Murofushi 57' 75' (pen.); Daiki Asaoka (yellow card) 45+1'; Taku Morinaga (yellow card) 66' (yellow card) 90+4' (yellow-red card)	Report	Hafiz Nor 2'; Shuhei Sasahara 36' (o.g.); M. Anumanthan (yellow card) 19'; Izzdin Shafiq (yellow card) 71'; Shakir Hamzah (yellow card) 84'; Fazli Ayob (yellow card) 90+4'	Referee: Muhammad Zulfiqar (Singapore)

3 October 2018 Semi Final 2nd Leg	Home United (Singapore)	0–1 (2–4 agg.)	(Singapore) Albirex Niigata (S)	Bishan Stadium
	Aqhari Abdullah (yellow card) 32'; Isaka Cernak (yellow card) 74'; Amy Recha (yellow card) 87'		Kenya Takahashi 63'; Shuhei Sasahara (yellow card) 27'; Shun Kumagai (yellow card) 57'; Adam Swandi (yellow card) 67'	Referee: Muhammad Taqi Aljaafari Bin Jahari (Singapore)

Home United lost 2–4 on aggregate.

6 October 2018 3rd/4th Placing	Home United (Singapore)	2–2 (4–5 p)	Balestier Khalsa	Jalan Besar Stadium
	Faritz Hameed 74'; Isaka Cernak 92' (pen.); Izzdin Shafiq (yellow card) 34'; Shakir Hamzah (yellow card) 39'; Faisal Roslan (yellow card) 56'		Hazzuwan Halim 26' (pen.); Keegan Linderboom 37'; Fariz Faizal (yellow card) 68'	Referee: Jansen Foo (Singapore)
	Penalties
	Isaka Cernak (penalty scored); Faritz Hameed (penalty scored); Shakir Hamzah (penalty scored); Izzdin Shafiq (penalty scored); Fazli Ayob (penalty missed)		Shaqi Sulaiman (penalty scored); Sufianto Salleh (penalty scored); Nurullah Hussein (penalty scored); Huzaifah Aziz (penalty scored); Sanjin Vrebac (penalty scored)
