= 2018 Albirex Niigata Singapore FC season =

Albirex Niigata (S)
2018 season
- Chairman: Daisuke Korenaga
- Head coach: Kazuaki Yoshinaga
- Stadium: Jurong East Stadium
- Singapore Premier League: Winners
- Singapore Cup: Winners
- Charity Shield: Winners

The 2018 season was Albirex Niigata Singapore FC's 15th consecutive season in the top flight of Singapore football and in the Singapore Premier League (formerly S.League), having joined the league in 2004. Along with the Singapore Premier League, the club also competed in the Singapore Cup and the Singapore League Cup. They were the defending champions.

== Key Events ==
=== Pre-season ===
1. On 28/11/2017, the team announced that they had renewed Head Coach Kazuaki Yoshinaga's contract for the S.League 2018 season.
2. On 15/12/2017, the team announced that age restrictions had been imposed by the FAS for the new season. Depending on the squad size (minimum of 19 players), they will have to make do with eight U-21 players, eight U-23 players and one player of any age. This is excluding 2 Singapore U-23 players which they can sign.

== Squad ==
=== S.League squad ===
As of 14 December 2017.

Squad No.	Name	Nationality	Date of birth (age)	Previous club
Goalkeepers
1	Shahul Rayyan	(Singapore)	12 February 1995 (age 31)	(Singapore) SAFSA (NFL D1)
21	Yosuke Nozawa	(Japan)	9 November 1979 (age 47)	(Japan) Matsumoto Yamaga FC
22	Taiki Itsukaichi	(Japan)	27 April 1998 (age 28)	Japan Soccer College
Defenders
2	Kazuki Sumiishi	(Japan)	12 May 1997 (age 29)	(Germany) SG Eintracht Mendig-Bell
3	Shuhei Sasahara	(Japan)	22 November 1996 (age 29)	(Japan) Tokai University
4	Shun Kumagai	(Japan)	7 August 1996 (age 30)	(Japan) Ventforet Kofu
5	Kaishu Yamazaki	(Japan)	12 July 1997 (age 29)	(Japan) Iwaki FC
7	Riku Moriyasu	(Japan)	21 June 1995 (age 31)	(Japan) Kyoto Sangyo University
15	Kodai Sumikawa	(Japan)	9 April 1999 (age 27)	(Japan) Teikyo Nagaoka High School
17	Ryujiro Yamanaka	(Japan)	24 September 1995 (age 31)	(Japan) Osaka Sangyo University
Midfielders
6	Daiki Asaoka	(Japan)	21 April 1995 (age 31)	(Japan) University of Tsukuba
8	Wataru Murofushi (Captain)	(Japan)	13 June 1995 (age 31)	(Japan) Juntendo University
10	Adam Swandi	(Singapore)	12 January 1996 (age 30)	(Singapore) Home United
16	Ryuji Yamauchi	(Japan)	20 May 1995 (age 31)	Japan Soccer College
19	Kazuya Kojima	(Japan)	7 July 1997 (age 29)	Japan Soccer College
20	Ryutaro Shibanoki	(Japan)	29 October 1998 (age 28)	Japan Soccer College
Strikers
9	Shuhei Hoshino	(Japan)	19 December 1995 (age 30)	(Japan) Ryutsu Keizai University
11	Kenya Takahashi	(Japan)	22 August 1995 (age 31)	(Japan) Yamanashi Gakuin University
13	Hiroyoshi Kamata	(Japan)	4 April 1997 (age 29)	(Japan) Albirex Niigata U18
14	Taku Morinaga	(Japan)	18 May 1995 (age 31)	(Japan) Ryutsu Keizai University
18	Ibuki Inoue	(Japan)	6 June 1999 (age 27)	(Japan) Daisho Gakuen High School

== Coaching staff ==
Position	Name
Head Coach	(Japan) Kazuaki Yoshinaga
Coach	(Japan) Keiji Shigetomi
Coach	(Japan) Yuto Inabe
Coach	(Japan) Kouichi Morinaga
Team Manager	(Singapore) Koh Mui Tee
Physiotherapist	(Japan)
Kitman	(Singapore) Roy Krishnan

== Transfer ==
=== Pre-season transfer ===
==== In ====
Position	Player	Transferred from	Ref
GK	(Singapore) Shahul Rayyan	(Singapore) SAFSA (NFL D1)	
DF	(Japan) Daiki Asaoka	(Japan) University of Tsukuba	
DF	(Japan) Riku Moriyasu	(Japan) Kyoto Sangyo University	
DF	(Japan) Shuhei Sasahara	(Japan) Tokai University	
DF	(Japan) Kodai Sumikawa	(Japan) Teikyo Nagaoka High School	
DF	(Japan) Kaishu Yamazaki	(Japan) Iwaki FC	
DF	(Japan) Kazuki Sumiishi	(Germany) SG Eintracht Mendig-Bell	
MF	(Japan) Wataru Murofushi	(Japan) Juntendo University	
MF	(Japan) Ryujiro Yamanaka	(Japan) Osaka Sangyo University	
MF	(Singapore) Adam Swandi	(Singapore) Home United	
FW/DF	(Japan) Shun Kumagai	(Japan) Ventforet Kofu (J2)	
FW	(Japan) Taku Morinaga	(Japan) Ryutsu Keizai University	
FW	(Japan) Shuhei Hoshino	(Japan) Ryutsu Keizai University	
FW	(Japan) Kenya Takahashi	(Japan) Yamanashi Gakuin University	
FW	(Japan) Ibuki Inoue	(Japan) Daisho Gakuen High School	

==== Out ====
Position	Player	Transferred To	Ref
GK	(Japan) Shuhei Yamada	(Japan) Briobecca Urayasu (J4)	Free Transfer
GK	(Japan) Junpei Yamada	Retired	Free Transfer
DF	(Japan) Tomoki Menda	(Japan)	Free Transfer
DF	(Japan) Takuya Akiyama	(Japan) Ventforet Kofu (J2)	Free Transfer
DF	(Japan) Yuki Yamanouchi	Retired	Free Transfer
DF	(Japan) Naofumi Tanaka	(Japan)	Free Transfer
DF	(Japan) Yasutaka Yanagi	(Japan) Albirex Niigata (J2)	Free Transfer
DF	(Japan) Rui Kumada	(Thailand) Khon Kaen United (T4)	Free Transfer
DF	(Japan) Seiya Kato	(Japan)	Free Transfer
MF	(Japan) Shuto Inaba	(Japan) Kataller Toyama (J3)	Free Transfer
MF	(Japan) Ryuya Motoda	(Japan) Mito Hollyhock (J2)	Loan return
MF	(Japan) Kento Nagasaki	(Thailand) Thai Honda Ladkrabang F.C. (T2)	Free Transfer
FW	(Japan) Tsubasa Sano	(Japan) Roasso Kumamoto (J2)	Free Transfer

==== Extension ====
Position	Player	Ref
GK	(Japan) Yosuke Nozawa	1 Year Extension
MF	(Japan) Hiroyoshi Kamata	1 Year Extension

=== Mid-season transfers ===
==== Trial ====
Position	Player	Trial At	Ref
MF	(Singapore) Adam Swandi	(Japan) Albirex Niigata	
MF	(Japan) Hiroyoshi Kamata	(Japan) Albirex Niigata	

== Friendly ==
=== Pre-Season Friendly ===
Win Draw Loss

24 February 2018 1	Saint Andrew's Junior College	0–5	(Singapore) Albirex Niigata (S)	Jurong East Stadium
1800 hours			Wataru Murofushi; Shuhei Hoshino; Hiroyoshi Kamata; Taku Morinaga

4 March 2018 2	SAFSA	0–8	(Singapore) Albirex Niigata (S)	Jurong East Stadium
1700 hours		Report	Hiroyoshi Kamata 5'; Kenya Takahashi 16', 65'; Wataru Murofushi 20', 40'; Taku Morinaga 47'; Adam Swandi 53', 69'

7 March 2018 3	Young Lions (Singapore)	1–1	(Singapore) Albirex Niigata (S)	Jurong East Stadium
1700 hours		Report	Adam Swandi 54'

10 March 2018 4	Warriors FC	cancelled	(Singapore) Albirex Niigata (S)	Choa Chu Kang Stadium
1700 hours

10 March 2018 4	Police SA	0–14	(Singapore) Albirex Niigata (S)	Jurong East Stadium
1700 hours		Report	Shuhei Hoshino 25', 31', 34', 57', 64', 81'; Taku Morinaga 36', 39'; Ryujiro Yamanaka 51'; Kenya Takahashi 56', 69', 82'; Ryutaro Shibanoki 60'; Ibuki Inoue 89'

14 March 2018 5	Singapore Cricket Club	0–2	(Singapore) Albirex Niigata (S)	Jurong East Stadium
2000 hours		Report	Hiroyoshi Kamata 42'; Shuhei Sasahara 61'

17 March 2018 6	Geylang International (Singapore)	0–2	(Singapore) Albirex Niigata (S)	Bedok Stadium
1700 hours		Report	Taku Morinaga 11'; Wataru Murofushi 42'

21 March 2018 7	NFA U18 (Singapore)	0–4	(Singapore) Albirex Niigata (S)	Jurong East Stadium
1930 hours		Report	Kenya Takahashi 26'; Hiroyoshi Kamata 72'; Shuhei Hoshino 87', 90'

24 March 2018 8	Hougang United (Singapore)	cancelled	(Singapore) Albirex Niigata (S)	Hougang Stadium
1700 hours

24 March 2018 9	Warriors FC (Singapore)	0–4	(Singapore) Albirex Niigata (S)	Choa Chu Kang Stadium
1700 hours

=== In-Season Friendly ===
18 June 2018 1	Myanmar National U23 team	1–4	(Singapore) Albirex Niigata (S)	Choa Chu Kang Stadium
1700 hours		Report

25 August 2018 2	Singapore National U18 team	3–5	(Singapore) Albirex Niigata (S)	Jurong East Stadium
	5'; 39'; 61'	Report	Ryutaro Shibanoki 10'; Taku Morinaga 15', 31', 41', 48'

== Team statistics ==
=== Appearances and goals ===
As of 29 September 2018

No.	Pos.	Player	Sleague		Singapore Cup		Total	
No.	Pos.	Player	Apps.	Goals	Apps.	Goals	Apps.	Goals
1	GK	(Singapore) Shahul Rayyan	0	0	0	0	0	0
2	DF	(Japan) Kazuki Sumiishi	1(9)	0	0	0	10	0
3	DF	(Japan) Shuhei Sasahara	21(2)	1	5	0	28	1
4	DF	(Japan) Shun Kumagai	11(1)	4	5	0	17	4
5	DF	(Japan) Kaishu Yamazaki	15	0	3	0	18	0
6	MF	(Japan) Daiki Asaoka	24	3	5	0	29	3
7	DF	(Japan) Riku Moriyasu	24	1	5	0	29	1
8	MF	(Japan) Wataru Murofushi	22	9	5	4	27	13
9	FW	(Japan) Shuhei Hoshino	23	19	2(1)	0	26	19
10	MF	(Singapore) Adam Swandi	19(3)	2	4(1)	2	27	4
11	FW	(Japan) Kenya Takahashi	24	6	4	2	28	8
13	FW	(Japan) Hiroyoshi Kamata	24	5	5	1	29	6
14	FW	(Japan) Taku Morinaga	24	11	3	2	27	13
15	DF	(Japan) Kodai Sumikawa	0(7)	1	0	0	7	1
16	MF	(Japan) Ryuji Yamauchi	0(1)	0	0	0	1	0
17	DF	(Japan) Ryujiro Yamanaka	11(13)	4	4(1)	0	29	4
18	FW	(Japan) Ibuki Inoue	0(2)	0	0	0	2	0
19	MF	(Japan) Kazuya Kojima	0	0	0	0	0	0
20	MF	(Japan) Ryutaro Shibanoki	0(4)	0	0(2)	0	6	0
21	GK	(Japan) Yosuke Nozawa	24	0	5	0	29	0
22	GK	(Japan) Taiki Itsukaichi	0	0	0	0	0	0

== Competitions ==
=== Overview ===
Competition	Record							
Competition	P	W	D	L	GF	GA	GD	Win %
S.League	24	21	3	0	69	17	+52	87.50
Singapore Cup	5	5	0	0	11	2	+9	100.00
Total	29	26	3	0	80	19	+61	89.66

=== Singapore Premier League ===
Win Draw Loss

31 March 2018 Round 1	Albirex Niigata (S) (Singapore)	2–1	(Singapore) Tampines Rovers	Singapore Sports Hub
	Taku Morinaga 59'; Shuhei Hoshino 89'		Mustafic Fahrudin 77'	Stadium: Singapore Sports Hub; Attendance: 18942; Referee: W. Ravisanthiran (Singapore)

8 April 2018 Round 2	Balestier Khalsa (Singapore)	0–1	(Singapore) Albirex Niigata (S)	Toa Payoh Stadium
			Sheikh Abdul Hadi 76' (o.g.)

14 April 2018 Round 3	Albirex Niigata (S) (Singapore)	2–0	(Brunei) DPMM FC	Jurong East Stadium
	Adam Swandi 1'; Wataru Murofushi 4'

18 April 2018 Round 4	Home United (Singapore)	1–6	(Singapore) Albirex Niigata (S)	Bishan Stadium
	Shahril Ishak 90' (pen.)		Shuhei Hoshino 8', 20'; Taku Morinaga 53'; Wataru Murofushi 69'; Daiki Asaoka 72'; Adam Swandi 90+4'

28 April 2018 Round 5	Albirex Niigata (S) (Singapore)	5–0	(Singapore) Geylang International	Jurong East Stadium
	Wataru Murofushi 17'; Kenya Takahashi 30'; Taku Morinaga 71'; Shuhei Hoshino 82'; Ryujiro Yamanaka 85'		Shawal Anuar (yellow card) 62'

6 May 2018 Round 6	Albirex Niigata (S) (Singapore)	1–0	(Singapore) Hougang United	Jurong East Stadium
	Kenya Takahashi 75'

13 May 2018 Round 7	Warriors FC (Singapore)	1–2	(Singapore) Albirex Niigata (S)	Choa Chu Kang Stadium
	Jonathan Béhé 79'		Shuhei Hoshino 20', 71'

16 May 2018 Round 8	Garena Young Lions (Singapore)	1–3	(Singapore) Albirex Niigata (S)	Jalan Besar Stadium
	Naufal Azman 90+4'		Shuhei Hoshino 8' (pen.) 49'; Kodai Sumikawa 90+3'	Referee: Nathan Chan (Singapore)

20 May 2018 Round 9	Tampines Rovers (Singapore)	3–4	(Singapore) Albirex Niigata (S)	Our Tampines Hub
	Fazrul Nawaz 24'; Ryutaro Megumi 63'; Zulfadhmi Suzliman 76'		Ryujiro Yamanaka 8', 65'; Shuhei Hoshino 47'; Daiki Asaoka 90+1'

27 May 2018 Round 10	Albirex Niigata (S) (Singapore)	5–0	(Singapore) Balestier Khalsa	Jurong East Stadium
	Shuhei Hoshino 9'; Taku Morinaga 50', 71', 73'; Hiroyoshi Kamata 67'			Referee: Ahmad A'Qashah (Singapore)

3 June 2018 Round 11	Albirex Niigata (S) (Singapore)	5–0	Brunei DPMM	Jurong East Stadium
	Taku Morinaga 9'; Shuhei Hoshino 36'; Wataru Murofushi 40', 92'; Ryujiro Yamanaka 78'

9 June 2018 Round 12	Albirex Niigata (S) (Singapore)	3–0	(Singapore) Home United	Jurong East Stadium
	Shuhei Hoshino 52', 84'; Kenya Takahashi 58'			Referee: Jansen Foo (Singapore)

24 June 2018 Round 13	Geylang International (Singapore)	0–3	(Singapore) Albirex Niigata (S)	Bedok Stadium
	Fairoz Hasan (yellow card) 45'		Shuhei Sasahara 27'; Wataru Murofushi 48'; Hiroyoshi Kamata 59'	Referee: Muhammad Taqi Aljaafari Bin Jahari (Singapore)

4 July 2018 Round 14	Hougang United (Singapore)	1–2	(Singapore) Albirex Niigata (S)	Hougang Stadium
	Amir Zalani 88'; Syaqir Sulaiman (yellow card) 23'; Ashrul Syafeeq (yellow card) 57'; Nurhilmi Jasni (yellow card) 59'		Hiroyoshi Kamata 38'; Shuhei Hoshino 69'; Kenya Takahashi (yellow card) 41'; Adam Swandi (yellow card) 90+3'

8 July 2018 Round 15	Albirex Niigata (S) (Singapore)	2–0	(Singapore) Warriors FC	Jurong East Stadium
	Wataru Murofushi 45+1'; Shuhei Hoshino 72'		Ho Wai Loon (yellow card) 78'	Referee: W. Ravisanthiran (Singapore)

14 July 2018 Round 16	Albirex Niigata (S) (Singapore)	2–1	(Singapore) Tampines Rovers	Jurong East Stadium
	Shuhei Hoshino 1', 50'		Khairul Amri 87'	Referee: Jansen Foo

18 July 2018 Round 17	Albirex Niigata (S) (Singapore)	5–1	(Singapore) Garena Young Lions	Jurong East Stadium
	Kenya Takahashi 34'; Taku Morinaga 38', 80'; Shuhei Hoshino 69'; Daiki Asaoka 90'		Hami Syahin 32'	Referee: Y.Sathyakumar (Singapore)

22 July 2018 Round 18	Balestier Khalsa (Singapore)	1–1	(Singapore) Albirex Niigata (S)	Toa Payoh Stadium
	Kenya Takahashi 32'		Hazzuwan Halim 47'

7 August 2018 Round 19 (Rescheduled)	Brunei DPMM	1–3	(Singapore) Albirex Niigata (S)	Hassanal Bolkiah National Stadium
	Priyomov 12' (pen.) (yellow card) 90+3'; Nur Ikhwan Othman (yellow card) 35'		Shuhei Hoshino 26'; Riku Moriyasu 72'; Taku Morinaga 90+2'

12 August 2018 Round 20 (Rescheduled)	Home United (Singapore)	1–1	(Singapore) Albirex Niigata (S)	Bishan Stadium
	Shahril Ishak 48'		Taku Morinaga (penalty missed) 10; Wataru Murofushi 90+4'; Shuhei Sasahara (yellow card) 76'	Referee: Ahmad A'Qashah (Singapore)

18 August 2018 Round 21	Albirex Niigata (S) (Singapore)	4–0	(Singapore) Geylang International	Jurong East Stadium
	Shun Kumagai 8' (yellow card) 42'; Taku Morinaga 65'; Hiroyoshi Kamata 69'; Darren Teh 87' (o.g.); Shuhei Hoshino (penalty missed) 82		Azhar Sairudin (yellow card) 23' (yellow card) 32' (yellow-red card); Yeo Hai Ngee (yellow card) 75'; Ahmad Zaki (yellow card) 42'; Fairoz Hassan (yellow card) 85'; Jufri Taha (yellow card) 90+1'; Danish Irfan (yellow card) 90+4'; Fuad Ramli (red card) 86'	Referee: Y.Sathyakumar (Singapore)

15 September 2018 Round 22	Garena Young Lions (Singapore)	1–3	(Singapore) Albirex Niigata (S)	Jalan Besar Stadium
	Yosuke Nozawa 21' (o.g.); Hami Syahin (yellow card) 13'; Syed Firdaus Hassan (yellow card) 39'; Irfan Fandi (yellow card) 59'		Kenya Takahashi 1'; Shun Kumagai 16'; Hiroyoshi Kamata 47'; Taku Morinaga (yellow card) 19'; Shuhei Sasahara (yellow card) 79'	Referee: Muhammad Zulfiqar (Singapore)

23 September 2018 Round 23	Albirex Niigata (S) (Singapore)	2–2	(Singapore) Hougang United	Jurong East Stadium
	Adam Swandi 62'; Shun Kumagai (yellow card) 52' (goal) 86'; Shuhei Hoshino (yellow card) 74'		Stanley Ng 14' (pen.); Shahfiq Ghani 90+2' (yellow card) 25'

29 September 2018 Round 24 (Rescheduled)	Warriors FC (Singapore)	1–2	(Singapore) Albirex Niigata (S)	Choa Chu Kang Stadium
	Kento Fukuda 45' (pen.); Ammirul Emmran (yellow card) 30'; Shamil Sharif (yellow card) 60'		Wataru Murofushi 24' (yellow card) 60'; Shun Kumagai 57' (yellow card) 39'; Taku Morinaga (yellow card) 90+1'	Referee: Muhammad Farhan B Abd Rahman (Singapore)

Pos	Team	Pld	W	D	L	GF	GA	GD	Pts	Qualification or relegation
1	Albirex Niigata (S) (Note: The two foreign clubs – Albirex Niigata (S) and DPMM FC – as well as the Football Association of Singapore (FAS) under-21 team, Young Lions, are ineligible for any AFC competition spots.) (C)	24	21	3	0	69	17	+52	66	
2	Home United	24	12	7	5	48	36	+12	43	Qualification to AFC Champions League Preliminary Round 1
3	DPMM FC	24	11	8	5	46	38	+8	41	
4	Tampines Rovers	24	12	4	8	43	27	+16	40	Qualification to AFC Cup Group Stage
5	Warriors FC	24	7	7	10	32	35	−3	28	

Updated to match(es) played on 29 September 2018. Source: Singapore Premier League
Rules for classification: 1) points; 2) goal difference; 3) number of goals scored; 4) number of wins
(C) Champions

=== Singapore Cup ===
Win Draw Loss

29 August 2018 Quarter Final 1st Leg	Hougang United (Singapore)	0–1	(Singapore) Albirex Niigata (S)	Hougang Stadium
	Illyas Lee (yellow card) 70'		Kenya Takahashi 74' (yellow card) 42'; Shuhei Hoshino (yellow card) 80'	Referee: G.Letchman (Singapore)

1 September 2018 Quarter Final 2nd Leg	Albirex Niigata (S) (Singapore)	2–0 (3–0 agg.)	(Singapore) Hougang United	Jurong East Stadium
	Taku Morinaga 42' 71'; Shuhei Hoshino (yellow card) 55'; Kenya Takahashi (yellow card) 76'		Jordan Vestering (yellow card) 23'; Fazrul Nawaz (yellow card) 30'; Illyas Lee (yellow card) 40'; Muhaimin Suhaimi (yellow card) 72'; Fabian Kwok (yellow card) 76'; Iqbal Hussain (yellow card) 90+2'	Referee: Ahmad A'Qashah (Singapore)

Albirex Niigata won 3–0 on aggregate.

26 September 2018 Semi Final 1st Leg	Albirex Niigata (S) (Singapore)	3–2	(Singapore) Home United	Jurong East Stadium
	Adam Swandi 12'; Wataru Murofushi 57' 75' (pen.); Daiki Asaoka (yellow card) 45+1'; Taku Morinaga (yellow card) 66' (yellow card) 90+4' (yellow-red card)	Report	Hafiz Nor 2'; Shuhei Sasahara 36' (o.g.); M. Anumanthan (yellow card) 19'; Izzdin Shafiq (yellow card) 71'; Shakir Hamzah (yellow card) 84'; Fazli Ayob (yellow card) 90+4'	Referee: Muhammad Zulfiqar (Singapore)

3 October 2018 Semi Final 2nd Leg	Home United (Singapore)	0–1 (2–4 agg.)	(Singapore) Albirex Niigata (S)	Bishan Stadium
	Aqhari Abdullah (yellow card) 32'; Isaka Cernak (yellow card) 74'; Amy Recha (yellow card) 87'		Kenya Takahashi 63'; Shuhei Sasahara (yellow card) 27'; Shun Kumagai (yellow card) 57'; Adam Swandi (yellow card) 67'	Referee: Muhammad Taqi Aljaafari Bin Jahari (Singapore)

Albirex Niigata won 4–2 on aggregate.

6 October 2018 Final	Albirex Niigata (S) (Singapore)	4–0	Brunei DPMM	Jalan Besar Stadium
	Wataru Murofushi 10' 64'; Adam Swandi 33'; Hiroyoshi Kamata 72'; Kenya Takahashi (yellow card) 90'		Azwan Ali Rahman 87' (yellow card) 38'	Referee: Nathan Chan (Singapore)

== See also ==
- 2017 Albirex Niigata Singapore FC season
- List of unbeaten football club seasons
