= 2018 Singapore Cup =

RHB Singapore Cup

Tournament details
- Country: Singapore
- Dates: 27 July 2018 to 6 October 2018
- Teams: 8

Final positions
- Champions: Albirex Niigata (S)
- Runners-up: DPMM FC
- Third place: Balestier Khalsa

Tournament statistics
- Matches played: 14
- Goals scored: 38 (2.71 per match)
- Top goal scorer(s): (Ukraine) Volodymyr Pryyomov (Japan) Wataru Murofushi; 4 goals

The 2018 Singapore Cup (also known as the RHB Singapore Cup for sponsorship reasons) is the 21st edition of Singapore's annual premier club football knock-out tournament organised by the Football Association of Singapore.

The draw was held on 24 June 2018.

== Quarter-finals ==
23-08-2018
7.45 PM

DPMM FC	2–2	Warriors FC
Brian McLean 65'; Volodymyr Pryyomov 84'; Yura Indera Putera (yellow card) 25'; Hendra Azam Idris (yellow card) 90+3'		Jonathan Béhé 8'; Ignatius Ang 35'; Suria Prakash (yellow card) 64'; Ismadi Mukhtar (yellow card) 71'

Jalan Besar Stadium
Referee: Muhammad Taqi Aljaafari Bin Jahari

19-09-2018
7.45 PM

Warriors FC	0–3	DPMM FC
Ho Wai Loon (red card) 89'; Shamil Sharif (yellow card) 90+5'		Shahrazen Said 9'; Azwan Ali Rahman 28'; Volodymyr Pryyomov 90'; Azwan Saleh (yellow card) 90+5'

Choa Chu Kang Stadium
Referee: Muhammad Zulfiqar

DPMM won 5–2 on aggregate.

29-08-2018
7.45 PM

Geylang International	0–0	Balestier Khalsa
Danish Irfan Azman (yellow card) 35'; Azhar Sairudin (yellow card) 48'; Afiq Yunos (yellow card) 50'		Noor Akid Nordin (yellow card) 27' (red card) 58'; Ahmad Syahir (yellow card) 42'

Bedok Stadium
Referee: Nathan Chan

01-09-2018
5.30PM

Balestier Khalsa	1–0	Geylang International
Hazzuwan Halim 85' (pen.)

Toa Payoh Stadium
Referee: W. Ravisanthiran

Balestier Khalsa won 1–0 on aggregate.

29-08-2018
7.45 PM

Hougang United	0–1	Albirex Niigata (S)
Illyas Lee (yellow card) 70'		Kenya Takahashi 74' (yellow card) 42'; Shuhei Hoshino (yellow card) 80'

Hougang Stadium
Referee: G.Letchman

01-09-2018
5.30 PM

Albirex Niigata (S)	2–0	Hougang United
Taku Morinaga 42' 71'; Shuhei Hoshino (yellow card) 55'; Kenya Takahashi (yellow card) 76'		Jordan Vestering (yellow card) 23'; Fazrul Nawaz (yellow card) 30'; Illyas Lee (yellow card) 40'; Muhaimin Suhaimi (yellow card) 72'; Fabian Kwok (yellow card) 76'; Iqbal Hussain (yellow card) 90+2'

Jurong East Stadium
Referee: Ahmad A'Qashah

Albirex Niigata won 3–0 on aggregate.

27-07-2018
7.45PM

Home United	1–2	Tampines Rovers
Shahril Ishak 61'		Khairul Amri 45+1'; Jordan Webb 85'; Yasir Hanapi (yellow card) 90' (yellow-red card)

Jalan Besar Stadium
Referee: Muhammad Taqi Aljaafari Bin Jahari

19-09-2018
7.45 PM

Tampines Rovers	1–3	Home United
Khairul Amri 45'; Daniel Bennett (yellow card) 86'; Syazwan Buhari (red card) 90+4'		Song Ui-young 21'; Iqram Rifqi 34'; Shahril Ishak 71'; Izzdin Shafiq (yellow card) 83'

Our Tampines Hub
Referee: Nathan Chan

Home United won 4–3 on aggregate.

== Semi-finals ==
26-09-2018
7.45 PM

Albirex Niigata (S)	3–2	Home United
Adam Swandi 12'; Wataru Murofushi 57' 75' (pen.); Daiki Asaoka (yellow card) 45+1'; Taku Morinaga (yellow card) 66' (yellow card) 90+4' (yellow-red card)	Report	Hafiz Nor 2'; Shuhei Sasahara 36' (o.g.); M. Anumanthan (yellow card) 19'; Izzdin Shafiq (yellow card) 71'; Shakir Hamzah (yellow card) 84'; Fazli Ayob (yellow card) 90+4'

Jurong East Stadium
Referee: Muhammad Zulfiqar

03-10-2018
7.45 PM

Home United	0–1	Albirex Niigata (S)
Aqhari Abdullah (yellow card) 32'; Isaka Cernak (yellow card) 74'; Amy Recha (yellow card) 87'		Kenya Takahashi 63'; Shuhei Sasahara (yellow card) 27'; Shun Kumagai (yellow card) 57'; Adam Swandi (yellow card) 67'

Bishan Stadium
Referee: Muhammad Taqi Aljaafari Bin Jahari

Albirex Niigata won 4–2 on aggregate.

26-09-2018
7.45 PM

DPMM FC	2–0	Balestier Khalsa
Volodymyr Pryyomov 68' (pen.); Adi Said 70'		Shaqi Sulaiman (yellow card) 38'

Jalan Besar Stadium
Referee: Muhammad Farhan B Abd Rahman

03-10-2018
7.45 PM

Balestier Khalsa	2–2	DPMM FC
Hazzuwan Halim 37' (pen.); Huzaifah Aziz 41'; Ahmad Syahir (yellow card) 77'		Shahrazen Said 79'; Volodymyr Pryyomov 83'; Haimie Anak Nyaring (yellow card) 36'

Toa Payoh Stadium
Referee: Y.Sathyakumar

DPMM won 4–2 on aggregate.

== 3rd and 4th Placing ==
06-10-2018
5 PM

Home United	2–2	Balestier Khalsa
Faritz Hameed 74'; Isaka Cernak 92' (pen.); Izzdin Shafiq (yellow card) 34'; Shakir Hamzah (yellow card) 39'; Faisal Roslan (yellow card) 56'		Hazzuwan Halim 26' (pen.); Keegan Linderboom 37'; Fariz Faizal (yellow card) 68'
Penalties
Isaka Cernak (penalty scored); Faritz Hameed (penalty scored); Shakir Hamzah (penalty scored); Izzdin Shafiq (penalty scored); Fazli Ayob (penalty missed)	4–5	Shaqi Sulaiman (penalty scored); Sufianto Salleh (penalty scored); Nurullah Hussein (penalty scored); Huzaifah Aziz (penalty scored); Sanjin Vrebac (penalty scored)

Jalan Besar Stadium
Referee: Jansen Foo

== Final ==
06-10-2018
7.45 PM

Albirex Niigata (S)	4–1	DPMM FC
Wataru Murofushi 10' 64'; Adam Swandi 33'; Hiroyoshi Kamata 72'; Kenya Takahashi (yellow card) 90'		Azwan Ali Rahman 87' (yellow card) 38'

Jalan Besar Stadium
Referee: Nathan Chan

== Season statistics ==
=== Top scorers ===
As of 6 October 2018

Rank	Player	Team	QF1	QF2	SF1	SF2	F	Total
1	(Ukraine) Volodymyr Pryyomov	DPMM FC	1	1	1	1	0	4
1	(Japan) Wataru Murofushi	Albirex Niigata (S)	0	0	2	0	2	4
3	(Singapore) Hazzuwan Halim	Balestier Khalsa	0	1	0	1	1	3
4	(Brunei) Azwan Ali Rahman	DPMM FC	0	1	0	0	1	2
4	(Brunei) Shahrazen Said	DPMM FC	0	1	0	1	0	2
4	(Japan) Taku Morinaga	Albirex Niigata (S)	0	2	0	0	0	2
4	(Japan) Kenya Takahashi	Albirex Niigata (S)	1	0	0	1	0	2
4	(Singapore) Adam Swandi	Albirex Niigata (S)	0	0	1	0	1	2
4	(Singapore) Khairul Amri	Tampines Rovers	1	1	0	0	0	2
