= Shafiq (name) =

Shafiq, Shafik, Shafeeq, Shafeeg, Shafique, Shafic, Chafiq, Chafic or Shafeek (Arabic: شفيق, Urdu: شفیق) is a masculine given name and surname of Arabic origin. Notable people with the name include:

== Given name ==
=== Chafic ===
- Chafic Nassif, Syriac Catholic Lebanese politician and lawyer

=== Shafeek ===
- Shafeek Ahmed Ansari (born 1976), Indian politician
- Shafeek Nader (1926–1986), American activist

=== Shafeeq ===
- Shafeeq (actor), Indian actor
- Shafeeq Faruk (born 1996), Singaporean footballer

=== Shafic ===
- Shafic Abboud (1926–2004), Lebanese painter

=== Shafik ===
- Shafik Assad (1937–2004), Israeli Arab politician
- Shafik Batambuze (born 1994), Ugandan footballer
- Shafik Chokin (1912–2003), the most recognized Kazakh scientist in the energy sector
- Shafik Handal (1930–2006), Salvadoran politician
- Shafik Nana Kwikiriza (born 2004), Ugandan footballer
- Shafik Rehman (born 1934), Bangladeshi journalist, political analyst, and writer
- Shafik Fauzan Sharif (born 1970), Malaysian politician
- Shafik Wazzan (1925–1999), the Prime Minister of Lebanon from 1980 until 1984
- Omar Shafik Hammami (1984–2013), American citizen, leader of the Somali Islamist militant group al-Shabaab

=== Shafiq ===
- Shafiq Ades (1900–1948), Iraqi-Jewish businessman
- Shafiq Afifi (born 1999), Malaysian footballer
- Shafiq Afridi, Pakistani politician
- Shafiq Sher Afridi, Pakistani politician
- Shafiq Ahmed (born 1949), Pakistani cricketer
- Shafique Ahmed (1937–2026), Bangladeshi politician
- Shafiqul Alam, Bangladeshi journalist
- Shafiq Arain (1933–2005), Indian politician and diplomat
- Shafiq Badr (died 2013), Lebanese politician
- Shafiq Chitou (born 1985), Beninese boxer
- Shafiq Fayadh (1937–2015), Syrian military commander
- Shafiq Ahmad Gujjar, Pakistani politician
- Shafiq Al-Hafiz (born 1997), Malaysian footballer
- Shafiq al-Hout (1932–2009), Palestinian politician and writer
- Shafiq Husayn, American hip hop artist from the group Sa-Ra
- Shafiqul Islam (disambiguation), multiple people
- Shafiq Kagimu (born 1998), Ugandan footballer
- Shafiq al-Kamali (1929–1984), Iraqi poet and politician
- Shafiq Ahmed Khan (died 2009), Pakistani politician
- Shafiq-Uz-Zaman Khan (born 1956), Pakistani calligrapher
- Shafique Khan (born 1968), Indian musician
- Shafiqul Azam Khan (born 1966), Bangladeshi politician
- Shafiq Qaadri (born 1963), Canadian politician
- Shafiq ur Rahman (disambiguation), multiple people
- Shafiq Rasul (born 1977), British detainee in the U.S., part of the Tipton Three
- Shafiq Shaharudin (born 1994), Malaysian footballer
- Shafiq Sharif (born 1990), Malaysian cricketer
- Shafique Ahmed Siddique (born 1950), Bangladeshi academic
- Shafiqul Ghani Swapan (1948–2009), Bangladeshi politician
- Shafiq Syed (born 1976), Indian actor
- Shafiq Tuhin (born 1976), Bangladeshi lyricist
- Shafique Uddin (born 1962), Bangladeshi-born British outsider artist
- Shafique Virani, Professor of Islamic Studies at the University of Toronto
- Shafique Wilson (born 2001), Canadian footballer
- Shafiq Zia (1931–1996), Pakistani first lady

== Surname ==
=== Shafeek ===
- Dino Shafeek (1930–1984), Bangladeshi actor

=== Shafik ===
- Ahmed Shafik (born 1941), Egyptian politician and a former candidate for the presidency of Egypt
- Ahmed Shafik (sexologist) (1933–2007), Egyptian researcher
- Chahryar Shafik (1945–1979), the son of Princess Ashraf Pahlavi, twin sister of the Shah of Iran, and Ahmad Shafiq
- Doria Shafik (1908–1975), Egyptian feminist, philosopher, poet, and editor
- Minouche Shafik (born 1962), British-American economist, former president of Columbia University
- Norhalis Shafik (born 1962), Singaporean football Defender
- Viola Shafik (born 1961), Egyptian-German film theorist, curator, and filmmaker

=== Shafiq ===
- Ali Shafiq (born 1996), Pakistani cricketer
- Asad Shafiq (born 1986), Pakistani cricketer
- Azadeh Shafiq (1951–2011), Iranian royalty
- Azhar Shafiq (born 1973), Pakistani cricketer
- Ivan Shafiq (born 1975), Pakistani Pashto music composer, songwriter, music producer, musician and philanthropist
- Izzdin Shafiq (born 1990), Singaporean footballer
- Mohammad Shafiq (disambiguation), several people
- Nasir Shafiq (born 1974), Malaysian cricketer
- Shaheen Shafiq, Pakistani politician
- Shahriar Shafiq (1945–1979), Iranian royalty
- Shawqi Shafiq (born 1955), Yemeni poet and translator
