= Shafiq =

Shafiq, Shafik, Shafeeq, Shafique, Shafic, Chafic or Shafeek (Arabic: شفيق, Urdu: شفیق, Romanized: Shafīq) may refer to

- Shafiq (name)
- Shafiq Mill Colony, a neighbourhood of Gulberg Town in Karachi, Pakistan
- Charles Shafiq Karthiga, a 2015 Tamil thriller film
