= Balochistan Liberation United Front =

Baloch nationalist militant organization in Pakistan

The Balochistan Liberation United Front (BLUF) was a Baloch nationalist militant organization in Pakistan. It first became known for claiming the kidnapping of American UNHCR worker John Solecki from Quetta on February 2, 2009. The BLUF demanded the release of thousands of Baloch nationalist prisoners it claimed were being held by the Pakistani government in Baloch insurgency. The group eventually released Solecki on April 4, 2009, on humanitarian grounds without any of its demands being met. BLUF also claimed the responsibility for a targeted attack on October 25, 2009 that killed Shafiq Ahmed Khan, the education minister of the Balochistan province. BLUF hasn't reported any activity since 2010.

== See also ==
- Separatist movements of Pakistan
