= Swandi Kitto =

Singaporean footballer

Personal information
- Place of birth: Singapore
- Position: Striker

Senior career*
Years	Team	Apps	(Gls)
????–1979	Ponggol Constituency		
1980–81	Tampines Rovers		
1982–????	Changi Constituency		

International career
- Singapore
- * Club domestic league appearances and goals

Swandi Kitto is a former Singaporean footballer who played as a striker for the Singapore national team in the 1970s and 80s. At club level, he played for Ponggol Constituency, Tampines Rovers and Changi Constituency in the National Football League.

== Personal life ==
Swandi is married to Hamidah Dasuki. They have a son, Adam Swandi, in 1996. Adam also became a footballer as a midfielder or winger and played for the Singapore national team.
