= Shafiq Arain =

Ugandan politician

High Commissioner of Uganda to the United Kingdom
- In office 1981–1983
- Prime Minister: Milton Obote

Personal details
- Children: Mona Arain, Selma Arain, Sasha Arain
- Education: University of Nottingham, Regents Polytechnic
- Occupation: Diplomat, Politician, Parliamentarian, Government Minister

Shafiq Arain was an Indian politician and diplomat who was the Minister of East African Community Affairs. He was married to Goan magistrate Leana Arain né(e) Godinho. In 1967, he served as Uganda’s Delegate to the UN General Assembly. Later, in 1980, he was appointed Uganda's High Commissioner to London.

== Early life and career ==
Arain was born in 1933 in Nsambya Landis, Kampala

In May 1962, Arain became a member of the Parliament of Uganda.

In 1970, following the coup, he left for exile. Following the defeat of Idi Amin’s dictatorial regime, Shafiq became the Ugandan High Commissioner to the United Kingdom.

He died on 20 March 2005 in Marbella, Spain.
