= Iqram Rifqi =

Singaporean footballer

Personal information
- Full name: Iqram Rifqi bin Mohammad Yazid
- Date of birth: 25 February 1996 (age 30)
- Place of birth: Singapore
- Positions: Full-back; winger

Team information
- Current team: Geylang International
- Number: 5

Youth career
- 2014–2015: National Football Academy
- 2016–2017: Home United Academy

Senior career*
Years	Team	Apps	(Gls)
2017–2022	Lion City Sailors	53	(3)
2021	→ Geylang International (loan)	7	(0)
2023	Balestier Khalsa	10	(0)
2024–2025	Starlight Soccerites		

International career^{‡}
2019–	Singapore	5	(0)
- * Club domestic league appearances and goals as of 14 May 2021 (UTC) ‡ National team caps and goals as of 2 June 2022

Iqram Rifqi bin Mohammad Yazid (born 25 February 1996) is a Singaporean professional footballer who plays as a full-back or winger for Singapore Premier League club Geylang International and the Singapore national team.

In May 2017, he was named Most Valuable Player of the tournament at Adidas’ Singapore edition of the worldwide futsal campaign Tango League.

== Club career ==
=== Home United ===
After graduating from the NFA squad, he moved to play for the Home United Prime League squad. He was promoted to the squad in 2018.

He has held his own among his teammates since making his senior debut in a Singapore Cup match against Warriors FC in July. He made ten appearances in the 2017 S.League.

In the 2022 AFC Champions League group stage fixture of matchday 3 against China club, Shandong Taishan, he kept a clean sheet and was named Man of the Match.

=== Balestier Khalsa ===
Iqram joins Balestier Khalsa for the upcoming 2023 Singapore Premier League season.

=== Starlight Soccerites ===
After being release by Balestier Khalsa, Iqram signed for semi-professional club Starlight Soccerites in January 2024.

== International career ==
Iqram was first called up to the national team in 2019, for the friendly against Qatar on 14 November 2019 and World Cup qualifiers against Yemen on 19 November. Iqram made his first professional start and debut on 14 November against Qatar.

== Honours ==
=== Club ===
Lion City Sailors

- Singapore Premier League: 2021
- Singapore Community Shield: 2022

== Career statistics ==
=== Club ===
As of match played 27 May 2022.

Club	Season	S.League		Singapore Cup		Singapore League Cup / Charity shield		Asia		Total	
Club	Season	Apps	Goals	Apps	Goals	Apps	Goals	Apps	Goals	Apps	Goals
Lion City Sailors	2017	10	0	5	1	3	1	0	0	18	2
Lion City Sailors	2018	16	2	5	1	0	0	1	0	22	3
Lion City Sailors	2019	17	0	3	1	0	0	5	0	25	1
Lion City Sailors	2020	1	0	0	0	0	0	0	0	1	0
Lion City Sailors	2022	8	1	0	0	1	0	6	0	15	1
Lion City Sailors	Total	52	3	13	3	4	1	12	0	81	7
Geylang International (loan)	2021	7	0	0	0	0	0	0	0	7	0
Geylang International (loan)	Total	7	0	0	0	0	0	0	0	7	0
Balestier Khalsa	2023	10	0	2	0	0	0	0	0	12	0
Balestier Khalsa	Total	10	0	2	0	0	0	0	0	12	0
Career total		65	3	15	3	4	1	6	0	90	7

=== International ===
Appearances and goals by national team and year
National team	Year	Apps	Goals
Singapore
Singapore	2019	2	0
Singapore	2021	2	0
Singapore	2022	0	0
Total		4	0
