= Shafiq Ahmed Khan =

Shafiq Ahmed Khan (Urdu: شفیق احمد خان) (died 25 October 2009) was a Pakistani politician who served as provisional minister of education of Balochistan.

On 25 October 2009, he was assasianted by a gunman on a motorcycle, the assasiantion was claimed by the separatist Balochistan Liberation United Front.
