= Shafiqul Islam =

Shafiqul Islam may refer to:

== People ==
- Shafiqul Islam (academic) (born 1960), Bangladeshi-American academic and author
- Shafiqul Islam (cricketer) (born 1997), Bangladeshi cricketer
- Shafiqul Islam (Kishoreganj politician), Bangladesh politician
- Shafiqul Islam (police officer) (born 1962), Bangladeshi police commissioner
- Shafiqul Islam (Sirajganj politician), Bangladeshi politician
- Shafiqul Islam Khoka (died 2017), Bangladeshi politician
- Shafiqul Islam Manik (born 1961), Bangladeshi footballer and coach
- Shafiqul Islam Masud (born 1978), Bangladeshi politician
- Shafiqul Islam Shimul (born 1976), Bangladeshi politician
- Shafiqul Islam Swapan, Bangladeshi cinematographer
- Md. Shafiqul Islam (born 1965), Bangladeshi politician
- Md. Shafiqul Islam (Sirajganj politician) (born 1952), Bangladeshi politician
- Murder of Mohamed Shafiqul Islam, Bangladeshi murder victim
