= Rudy Khairullah =

Singaporean footballer

Personal information
- Full name: Rudy Khairullah bin Adi Negara
- Date of birth: 19 July 1994 (age 32)
- Place of birth: Singapore
- Height: 1.81 m (5 ft 11 1/2 in)
- Position: Goalkeeper

Team information
- Current team: Geylang International
- Number: 24

Senior career*
Years	Team	Apps	(Gls)
2012	Gombak United	3	(0)
2013–2015	Courts Young Lions	25	(0)
2017–2023	Lion City Sailors	16	(0)
2022	→ Balestier Khalsa (loan)	12	(0)
2023	→ Geylang International (loan)	3	(0)
2024–	Geylang International	51	(0)
- * Club domestic league appearances and goals as of 07:33, 24 November 2014 (UTC)

Rudy Khairullah bin Adi Negara (born 19 July 1994) is a Singaporean footballer who plays as a goalkeeper for Singapore Premier League club Geylang International.

== Club career ==
=== Gombak United ===
Rudy started his career with S.League club Gombak United making 3 league appearances in the 2012 season.

=== Courts Young Lions ===
Rudy joined under-23 developmental side Courts Young Lions after Gombak United withdrew from the S.League at the end of the 2012 season.

=== Home United (Now known as Lion City Sailors) ===
Rudy joined Home United in 2017 after he completed his compulsory National Service.

=== Loan to Balestier Khalsa ===
On 12 January 2022, Rudy was loaned to Balestier Khalsa ahead of the 2022 Singapore Premier League season after falling behind the pecking order being the fourth choice goalkeeper behind Hassan Sunny, Izwan Mahbud and Adib Nor Hakim.

=== Loan to Geylang International ===
Rudy was loaned to Geylang International on 27 June 2023 midway throughout the season to get more game time. In the 2024 season, Rudy was chosen as the main choice goalkeeper for the club.

== International career ==
=== Youth ===
Rudy represented Singapore U23 at the 2014 Asian Games. He was called up to the senior team for the friendly matches against Papua New Guinea and Hong Kong on in September 2014 with both match being held at the Hougang Stadium but has yet to make his international debut.

=== Senior ===
In December 2024, Rudy was called up by Singapore national team head coach, Tsutomu Ogura for the 2024 ASEAN Championship

== Career statistics ==
As of 12 Jul 2022

Club performance
Club	Season	S.League		Singapore Cup		Singapore League Cup		AFC Cup		Total	
Club	Season	Apps	Goals	Apps	Goals	Apps	Goals	Apps	Goals	Apps	Goals
Gombak United	2012	3	0	0	0	0	0	0	0	3	0
Gombak United	Total	3	0	0	0	0	0	0	0	3	0
Courts Young Lions	2013	11	0	0	0	1	0	0	0	12	0
Courts Young Lions	2014	9	0	0	0	0	0	0	0	9	0
Courts Young Lions	2015	5	0	0	0	0	0	0	0	5	0
Courts Young Lions	Total	25	0	0	0	1	0	0	0	26	0
Police SA	2016	0	0	0	0	0	0	0	0	0	0
Police SA	Total	0	0	0	0	0	0	0	0	0	0
Home United	2017	5	0	1	0	1	0	0	0	7	0
Home United	2018	18	0	1	0	0	0	10	0	29	0
Home United	2019	3	0	2	0	0	0	3	0	8	0
Total		26	0	4	0	1	0	13	0	44	0
Lion City Sailors	2020	3	0	0	0	0	0	0	0	3	0
Lion City Sailors	2021	2	0	0	0	0	0	0	0	2	0
Lion City Sailors	2022	0	0	0	0	0	0	0	0	0	0
Lion City Sailors	2023	0	0	0	0	0	0	0	0	0	0
Lion City Sailors	Total	5	0	0	0	0	0	0	0	5	0
Balestier Khalsa (loan)	2022	6	0	0	0	0	0	0	0	6	0
Balestier Khalsa (loan)	Total	6	0	0	0	0	0	0	0	6	0
Geylang International (loan)	2023	3	0	2	0	0	0	0	0	5	0
Geylang International	2024–25	0	0	0	0	0	0	0	0	0	0
Geylang International	Total	3	0	2	0	0	0	0	0	5	0
Career total		68	0	6	0	2	0	13	0	89	0

== Honours ==
Lion City Sailors

• Singapore Premier League: 2021

• Singapore Community Shield: 2022
