= Mohammad Shafiq (disambiguation) =

Mohammad Shafiq (variants: Mohammed, Muhammad, Shafik, Shafeek, Shafeeq, Shafique, Shafic, Chafic) may refer to

- Mohammad Shafiq (born 1934), Pakistan Army soldier
- Mohammad Musa Shafiq (1932–1979), Prime Minister of Afghanistan
- Muhammad Shafiq (born 1953), Pakistani handball administrator
- Mohammed Shafiq (born 1979), English-born chief executive of the Ramadhan Foundation
- Muhammad Shafiq Jamal (born 1987), Malaysian Footballer
- Mohammad Shafiq Hamdam, writer and a political activist in Afghanistan
