= Ahmad Zaki (footballer) =

Egyptian footballer (born 1999)

Ahmed Zaki
Personal information
- Full name: Ahmed Zaki
- Date of birth: 4 February 1999 (age 27)
- Position: Defender

Team information
- Current team: Zamalek
- Number: 26

Youth career
- –2022: Zamalek

Senior career*
Years	Team	Apps	(Gls)
2022–	Zamalek	2	(0)

International career
	Egypt U20	0	(0)
- * Club domestic league appearances and goals

Ahmed Zaki (Arabic: أَحْمَد زَكِيّ; born 4 February 1999) is an Egyptian professional footballer who plays as a defender for Egyptian Premier League club Zamalek.
