= Wataru Murofushi =

Japanese footballer

Personal information
- Full name: Wataru Murofushi
- Date of birth: 13 June 1995 (age 31)
- Place of birth: Aichi, Japan
- Height: 1.72 m (5 ft 8 in)
- Position: Midfielder

Youth career
- 2011–2013: Ichiritsu Funabashi High School

College career
| Years | Team | Apps | (Gls) |
| 2014–2017 | Juntendo University | | |

Senior career*
| Years | Team | Apps | (Gls) |
| 2018 | Albirex Niigata (S) | 22 | (9) |
| 2019–2020 | York9 | 30 | (3) |
| 2021–2022 | Bucheon 1995 | 3 | (0) |
| 2022–2023 | Rovers Kisarazu | 0 | (0) |
- * Club domestic league appearances and goals as of 9 October 2021

Wataru Murofushi (室伏 航, Murofushi Wataru; born 13 June 1995) is a Japanese professional footballer who plays as a midfielder for South Korean club Bucheon FC 1995.

Mainly acting as a central midfielder, he can also play in more offensive or more defensive positions of the midfield.

== Club career ==
=== Albirex Niigata (S) ===
After graduating from Juntendo University, Murofushi signed for Albirex Niigata Singapore, despite he originally intended to go to the United States to take trials.

He debuted in the local Premier League on March 31, 2018, playing the entirety of the match against Tampines Rovers, ended in a 2-1 win for his side. His first goal came on April 14, when he took part in the White Swans' 2-0 win against DPMM, while he scored his first brace on June 3, in another victory (5-0) against the same team. He also scored two consecutive braces in the semi-final and the final of the local cup, eventually won by Albirex.

With a total amount of 28 appearances and 13 goals, Murofushi played a considerable role in the White Swans' brilliant season, which saw his team win all three domestic trophies (the SPL, the Singapore Cup and the Singapore Community Shield) completely unbeaten, while he was awarded as the Player of the Year, as well as nominated by fans for the league's Best XI.

=== York9 ===
On January 22, 2019, Murofushi signed with Canadian side York9 (later renamed York United), which was set to participate in the debut season of the national Premier League. He made his debut in the CPL's inaugural match, when York9 played against Forge FC on April 27, 2019, while he scored his first goal for York on August 25, 2019 against FC Edmonton. With a total amount of 23 appearances and three goals, the Japanese was involved in the team's historic first season, ended in sixth place in the Spring round and in third place in the Autumn round. He also played six times in the Canadian Championship, where York reached the third qualifying round before being eliminated by the Montreal Impact after a two-legged tie.

Although the second season of the CPL was postponed and later rescheduled due to the consequences of the COVID-19 pandemic, Murofushi was still able to join York for the so-called "Island Games" (as a shortened edition of the CPL was entirely organized in Charlottetown, on the Prince Edward Island) and played in all of the seven matches his team was involved in, without scoring a single goal. However, York9 failed to progress to the second round of the competition as they finished in fifth place, just one point behind last-qualified Pacific.

=== Bucheon ===
On 9 February 2021, Murofushi signed with South Korean side Bucheon 1995, which was set to play in K League 2, for an undisclosed fee.

== Career statistics ==
As of 6 September 2020

Club statistics
| Club | Season | League | | | National Cup (Note: Includes the Singapore Cup and Canadian Championship.) | | League Cup | | Other (Note: Includes the Singapore Community Shield.) | | Total | |
| Club | Season | League | Apps | Goals | Apps | Goals | Apps | Goals | Apps | Goals | Apps | Goals |
|---|---|---|---|---|---|---|---|---|---|---|---|---|
| Albirex Niigata (S) | 2018 | Singapore Premier League | 22 | 9 | 5 | 4 | — | | 1 | 0 | 28 | 13 |
| Albirex Niigata (S) | Total | | 22 | 9 | 5 | 4 | 0 | 0 | 1 | 0 | 28 | 13 |
| York9 | 2019 | Canadian Premier League | 23 | 3 | 6 | 0 | — | | 0 | 0 | 29 | 3 |
| York9 | 2020 | Canadian Premier League | 7 | 0 | — | | — | | 0 | 0 | 7 | 0 |
| York9 | Total | | 30 | 3 | 6 | 0 | 0 | 0 | 0 | 0 | 36 | 3 |
| Bucheon FC 1995 | 2021 | K League 2 | 0 | 0 | 0 | 0 | — | | 0 | 0 | 0 | 0 |
| Bucheon FC 1995 | Total | | 0 | 0 | 0 | 0 | 0 | 0 | 0 | 0 | 0 | 0 |
| Career total | | | 52 | 12 | 11 | 4 | 0 | 0 | 1 | 0 | 64 | 16 |

== Honours ==
Albirex Niigata (S)

- Singapore Premier League: 2018
- Singapore Cup: 2018
- Singapore Community Shield: 2018

Individual

- Singapore Premier League Player of the Year: 2018
- Singapore Premier League Fan XI: 2018
