= Shuhei Hoshino =

Japanese footballer

Personal information
- Date of birth: 19 December 1995 (age 30)
- Place of birth: Saitama, Japan
- Height: 1.83 m (6 ft 0 in)
- Positions: Centre-back; striker

Team information
- Current team: Geylang International

Youth career
- Sakado Diplomats FC
- 2011–2013: RKU Kashiwa High School

College career
Years	Team	Apps	(Gls)
2014–2017	Ryutsu Keizai University		

Senior career*
Years	Team	Apps	(Gls)
2018	Albirex Niigata (S)	23	(19)
2019	Busan Transportation Corporation	12	(1)
2020–2023	Balestier Khalsa	83	(36)
2024–2025	Albirex Niigata (S)	25	(7)
2025–	Geylang International	21	(5)
- * Club domestic league appearances and goals as of 15:04, 13 July 2021 (UTC)

Shuhei Hoshino (星野 秀平, Hoshino Shuhei; born 19 December 1995), nicknamed Jumbo, is a Japanese professional footballer who plays either as a centre-back or striker for Singapore Premier League club Geylang International.

Shuhei is the current all-time top goal scorer of Balestier Khalsa with 43 goals.

== Club career ==
=== Albirex Niigata (S) ===
Shuhei signed his first professional contract for the White Swans after leaving Ryutsu Keizai University. By late July 2018, and with 3 more months to the end of the season, Hoshino's 18 goal tally has helped the White Swans wrap up the 2018 Singapore Premier League title. Hoshino eventually scored 19 goals that season and won the Top Goalscorer award.

Shuhei was also selected for the 2018 Sultan of Selangor Cup and scored in the match, which ended a 1–1 draw; with the Singapore selection losing 5–3 on penalties to Selangor.

=== Busan Transportation Corporation ===
On 13 January 2019, Shuhei joined Busan Transportation Corporation playing in the upcoming 2019 Korea National League season which is the third highest division in the South Korean football league system. On 4 May 2019, he recorded 1 goal and 1 assist in a league match against Daejeon KoRail in a 3–0 home win.

=== Balestier Khalsa ===
On 7 January 2020, Shuhei arrived back in the sunny shores of Singapore when Balestier Khalsa announced his signing for the 2020 Singapore Premier League season. He notched his first competitive Balestier goal in a 2–2 draw against his former club, Albirex in the second game of the season. On 12 August 2022, Shuhei recorded his first hat-trick for the club in a 6–1 win against Hougang United. Exactly one year later on 12 August 2023, this time he scored 1 goal and recorded a hat-trick of assist against Geylang International in a 2–6 away win. On 25 November 2023, Shuhei scored a poker in a 7–2 win against Tanjong Pagar United in the 2023 Singapore Cup.

=== Return to Albirex Niigata (S) ===
On 23 December 2023, Albirex Niigata (S) announced that Shuhei will return to the club after six years since the 2018 season. On 18 May 2024, Shuhei scored his first goal for the club in over 6 years to secure a 1–0 win over Hougang United.

=== Geylang International ===
On 15 July 2025, Shuhei joined Geylang International making it his seven season in the Singapore Premier League.

== Career statistics ==
=== Club ===
As of 18 Feb 26

Club	Season	League			Cup		Other		Total	
Club	Season	Division	Apps	Goals	Apps	Goals	Apps	Goals	Apps	Goals
Albirex Niigata (S)	2018	Singapore Premier League	23	19	3 (Note: Appearances in the Singapore Cup)	0	0	0	26	19
Albirex Niigata (S)	Total		23	19	3	0	0	0	26	19
Busan TC (K3 League)	2019	Korea National League	12	1	1 (Note: Appearances in the Korean FA Cup)	0	2 (Note: Appearances in the Korea National League Championship)	0	15	1
Busan TC (K3 League)	Total		12	1	1	0	2	0	15	1
Balestier Khalsa	2020	Singapore Premier League	14	4	0	0	0	0	14	4
Balestier Khalsa	2021	Singapore Premier League	21	3	0	0	0	0	21	3
Balestier Khalsa	2022	Singapore Premier League	26	18	5	2	0	0	31	20
Balestier Khalsa	2023	Singapore Premier League	22	11	3	5	0	0	25	16
Balestier Khalsa	Total		83	36	8	7	0	0	91	43
Albirex Niigata (S)	2024–25	Singapore Premier League	24	7	4	0	1	0	29	7
Albirex Niigata (S)	Total		24	7	4	0	1	0	29	7
Geylang International	2025–26	Singapore Premier League	10	1	4	2	0	0	14	3
Geylang International	Total		10	1	4	2	0	0	14	3
Career total			152	64	20	9	3	0	175	73

== Honours ==
=== Club ===
==== Albirex Niigata Singapore ====
- Singapore Premier League: 2018
- Singapore Cup: 2018
- Singapore Community Shield: 2018

=== Individual ===
- Singapore Premier League Top Scorer: 2018
- Singapore Premier League Team of the Year: 2018
