= Aqhari Abdullah =

Singaporean footballer

Personal information
- Full name: Muhammad Aqhari bin Abdullah
- Date of birth: 9 July 1991 (age 35)
- Place of birth: Singapore
- Height: 1.70 m (5 ft 7 in)
- Positions: Full-back; winger; central midfielder

Senior career*
Years	Team	Apps	(Gls)
2010	Balestier Khalsa	1	(0)
2011	Hougang United	12	(0)
2012	Young Lions	16	(1)
2013–2015	LionsXII	7	(0)
2016–2021	Lion City Sailors	110	(0)
2022	Tanjong Pagar United	27	(0)

International career
- Singapore U23
2014–	Singapore		
- * Club domestic league appearances and goals as of 19 July 2022

Muhammad Aqhari bin Abdullah (born 9 July 1991) is a Singaporean former footballer who played primarily as a full-back. Primarily a full-back, he is also capable of playing as a winger or central-midfielder.

== Club career ==
Aqhari began his football career with Balestier Khalsa in the S.League in 2010 before moving to Hougang United in 2011 and Young Lions in 2012.

In January 2013, he was named in the LionsXII squad for the 2013 Malaysia Super League.

=== Lion City Sailors ===
In 2016, he joined Lion City Sailors. On 1 November 2021, Lion City Sailors announced that Aqhari would not continue with the team in the following season.

=== Tanjong Pagar United ===
On 23 January 2022, Aqhari signed for Tanjong Pagar United for the 2022 season.

== International career ==
Aqhari was first called up to the national senior team for the friendly match against France U21 on 2 June 2014.

== Personal life ==
Aqhari's father is former Singapore international and ex-Balestier Khalsa head coach Abdullah Noor.

He graduated from the Singapore Sports School in 2008.

== Career statistics ==
=== Club ===
As of match played 6 November 1922

Club	Season	S.League		Singapore Cup		Singapore League Cup		Asia		Total	
Club	Season	Apps	Goals	Apps	Goals	Apps	Goals	Apps	Goals	Apps	Goals
Balestier Khalsa	2010	1	0	0	0	-	-	—		1	0
Balestier Khalsa	Total	1	0	0	0	0	0	0	0	1	0
Hougang United	2011	12	0	2	0	1	0	—		15	0
Hougang United	Total	12	0	2	0	1	0	0	0	15	0
Young Lions	2012	16	1	—		2	0	—		18	1
Young Lions	Total	16	1	0	0	2	0	0	0	18	1
Club	Season	Malaysia Super League		Malaysia FA Cup		Malaysia Cup		Asia		Total	
LionsXII	2013	4	0	1	0	3	0	—		8	0
LionsXII	2014	3	0	0	0	0	0	—		3	0
LionsXII	Total	7	0	1	0	3	0	0	0	11	0
Club	Season	S.League		Singapore Cup		Singapore League Cup		Asia		Total	
Club	Season	Apps	Goals	Apps	Goals	Apps	Goals	Apps	Goals	Apps	Goals
Tampines Rovers	2015	9	1	1	0	2	0	0	0	12	1
Tampines Rovers	Total	9	1	1	0	2	0	0	0	12	1
Home United	2016	17	0	4	0	1	0	0	0	22	0
Home United	2017	13	0	4	0	1	0	7	0	25	0
Home United	2018	14	0	7	0	0	0	11	0	32	0
Home United	2019	18	0	2	0	1	0	6	0	27	0
Home United	Total	62	0	17	0	3	0	24	0	106	0
Lion City Sailors	2020	10	0	0	0	0	0	0	0	10	0
Lion City Sailors	2021	9	0	0	0	0	0	0	0	9	0
Lion City Sailors	Total	19	0	0	0	0	0	0	0	19	0
Tanjong Pagar United	2022	26	0	3	0	0	0	0	0	29	0
Tanjong Pagar United	Total	26	0	3	0	1	0	0	0	29	0
Career Total		152	2	24	0	11	0	24	0	211	2

- Young Lions and LionsXII are ineligible for qualification to Asian Football Confederation competitions in their respective leagues.
- Young Lions withdrew from the 2012 Singapore Cup due to participation in the 2013 AFC U-22 Championship qualifiers.

== Honours ==
=== Club ===
==== LionsXII ====
- Malaysia Super League: 2013

==== Lion City Sailors ====
- Singapore Premier League: 2021
