= Adam Swandi =

Singaporean professional footballer

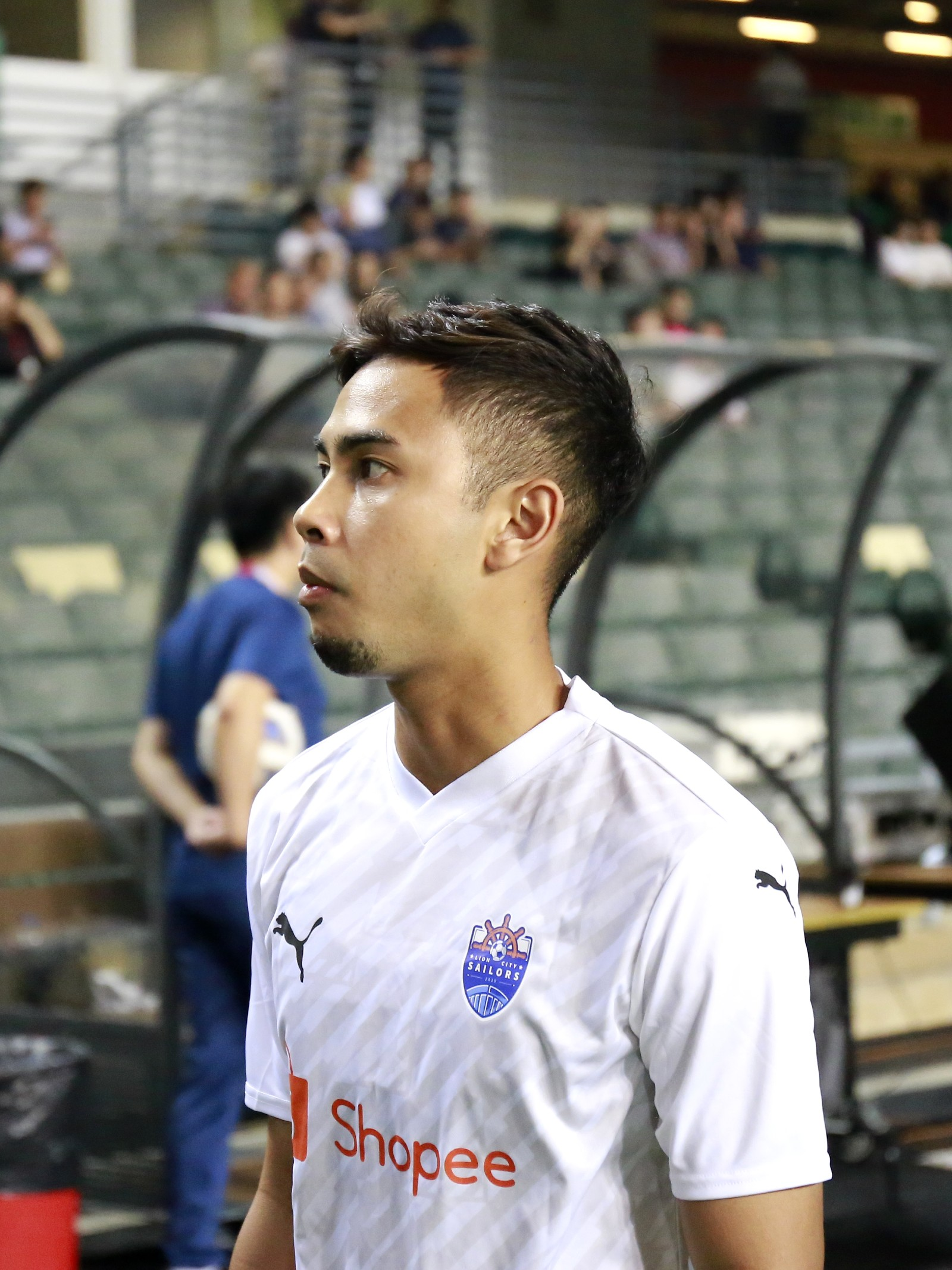
- Adam in action for Lion City Sailors in the 2023–24 AFC Champions League match.

Personal information
- Full name: Adam bin Swandi
- Date of birth: 12 January 1996 (age 30)
- Place of birth: Singapore
- Height: 1.70 m (5 ft 7 in)
- Positions: Midfielder; winger

Youth career
- 2009–2013: National Football Academy
- 2013–2014: FC Metz

Senior career*
Years	Team	Apps	(Gls)
2015–2016	Young Lions	34	(4)
2017	Home United	31	(9)
2018	Albirex Niigata (S)	24	(5)
2019–2024	Lion City Sailors	65	(8)

International career^{‡}
2010	Singapore U14	1	(1)
2011	Singapore U15	3	(11)
2012	Singapore U16	6	(5)
2015–2019	Singapore U22	3	(0)
2013–2024	Singapore	22	(2)
- * Club domestic league appearances and goals as of 18 April 2017 ‡ National team caps and goals as of 2 June 2022

Adam bin Swandi (born 12 January 1996) is a Singaporean former footballer who last played either as a midfielder or winger for Singapore Premier League club Lion City Sailors and the Singapore national team.

== Club career ==
=== Youth career ===
Adam won the Dollah Kassim award in 2011 which got him an overseas training stint with English Premier League side, Newcastle United Academy.

In 2011, during the 23rd edition of the Lion City Cup in Singapore, Adam captained the NFA Under-15 team to 3rd place with victories over Newcastle U-15 and Juventus U-15. Adam then competed at the 2011 AFF U-16 Youth Championship, with the Singapore Under-15 team where they finished 4th, winning the tournament's Fair Play Award as Adam scored 5 goals to finish as top goalscorer. A year later in 2012, Adam and the Singapore Under-16 team finished in 2nd place with wins over Ajax U-15 and Vasco da Gama U-15, and a draw with Porto U-15, before losing eventual to champions Ajax U-15 in the final. Adam subsequently won the Singapore Under-16 Most Valuable Player award. Domestically, the Singapore Under-16 team won the Football Association of Singapore (FAS) U18 COE league with Adam winning the Most Valuable Player award.

In March 2012, Adam was chosen along with Muhaimin Suhaimi and four other students at the Singapore Sports School to undergo a ten-day training camp with the youth team of J.League club, Albirex Niigata. Adam was the only one called back for a longer training session in August the same year as their U-18 head coach, Nobuhiro Ueno was reportedly impressed by his control and one-touch passing, saying it was better than some of the players at the club's academy.

=== FC Metz ===
On 23 February 2013, Adam signed a two-year contract with Ligue 2 club, FC Metz, joining their Under-19 set-up in the Championnat National youth competitions. He had impressed the staff and coaches during his 10-day stint at Metz following his 45-day European tour which includes training spells at illustrious clubs such as Newcastle United, Chelsea and Atlético Madrid. Despite offers of a one-year contract from Spanish club Atlético Madrid and Dutch club AFC Ajax, Adam chose to sign for FC Metz as he liked what he saw and experienced, and was impressed with the quality of its renowned youth academy. The FAS provided financial assistance to the tune of S$200,000 from its Football Development Fund for Adam's education in France.

During his time at Atletico Madrid, Adam had impressed the club CEO, Miguel Ángel Gil Marín in which he would be keen to nurture Adam and would consider signing him to the youth academy however with the mandatory National Service, Gil Marín has decided not to sign the teenager.

=== Young Lions ===
Adam Swandi was nominally included in the 24-man Courts Young Lions squad which travelled to Turkey for a series of friendly matches in January 2014. Adam signed for Courts Young Lions for the 2015 S.League season. Adam scored his first career professional goal in a S.League match in a 1–2 defeat to Warriors FC.

=== Home United ===
Adam moved to Home United for the 2017 S.League season after leaving the Young Lions. He made his debut for Home United in the first leg of the 2017 AFC Cup qualifying match against Cambodian side, Phnom Penh Crown in which he scored his first competitive goal in the second leg, helping his team advance into the group stage. Coincidentally, his second goal came in Home United final game of the 2017 AFC Cup group stage, the last goal in a 4–1 routing of Myanmar club, Yadanarbon, sending his team into the Zonal semi-finals. In total, Adam made 30 appearances in all competitions in his first season with the Protectors, scoring 7 goals and making 2 assists.

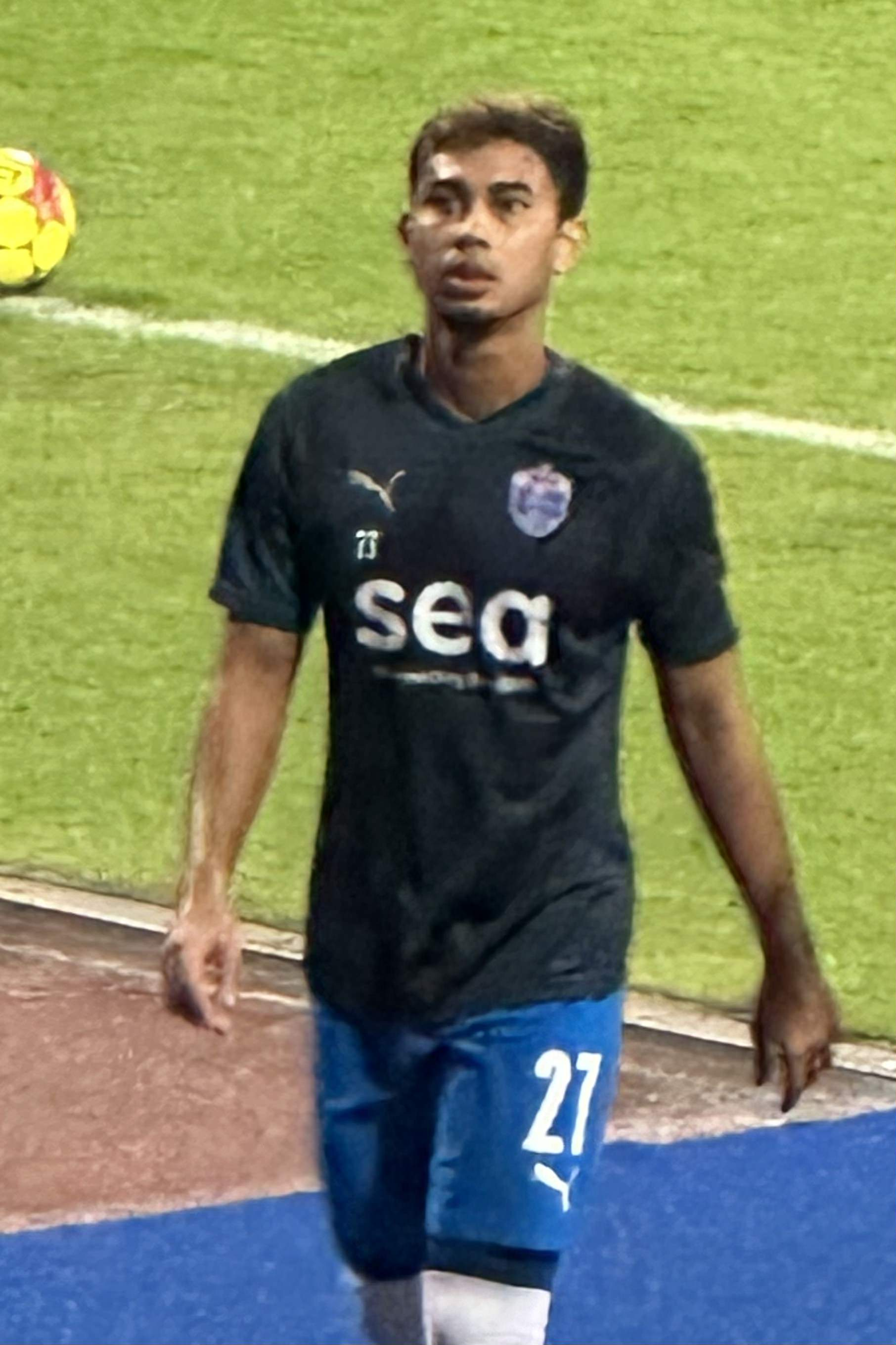
Adam warming up for Lion City Sailors in 2024

=== Albirex Niigata Singapore ===
On 8 January 2018, Adam was announced by Albirex Niigata (S) that they have signed him for the inaugural 2018 Singapore Premier League season. He will be the first Singaporean player to play for the club and will be joined by local goalkeeper, Shahul Rayyan after he completes his National Service. Adam made his debut for Albirex in a 2–1 win in the 2018 Singapore Community Shield against Tampines Rovers. Adam ended his first season with the White Swans with 3 winners medal, helping his club sweep all domestic trophies on offer. He was rewarded for his effort and named as the Young Player of the Season.

=== Home United (Now known as Lion City Sailors) ===
After a season with Albirex Niigata (S), Adam decided to rejoin Home United for the 2019 Singapore Premier League season due to the lure of continental football and started in all of the first 12 games of the season for the Protectors and has already equalised his tally of 3 league goals of last season.

In 2021, Adam won the 2021 SPL title with the Sailors.

On 25 June 2023, Adam pulled on a performance against Hougang United with 2 goals and 1 assist with nearly scoring a hat-trick at the very last minute of the match. He would win the 2023 Singapore Cup with the Sailors.

In September 2024, during a SPL match against Tanjong Pagar United FC, Adam scored the second goal for the Sailors and felt unwell. He was substituted at half-time and taken to Ng Teng Fong General Hospital.

On 24 December, Adam announced his retirement from professional football due to cardiomyopathy.

== International career ==
Adam was the Singapore Under-16s' team captain for the 2012 Lion City Cup.

In May 2013, Adam was called up by the new Singapore head coach, Bernd Stange for the friendlies against Myanmar and Laos.

Adam made his first international appearance aged 17 years and 143 days when he came on as a second-half substitute in place of Indra Sahdan in the friendly against Myanmar on 4 June 2013. His first start came against Laos on 11 October 2013.

Adam earned his first recall into the national team in September 2015 in head coach Bernd Stange's 23-strong Singapore squad to take on Syria in their 2018 FIFA World Cup qualifications but failed to make an appearance. As of December 2017, he remains capped only 5 times for the senior national team. He finally earned his sixth cap in a 13-minute cameo during Singapore's 1–0 win over Indonesia in the 2018 AFF Championship a year later.

On 14 December 2021, Adam scored his first international goal in the 2020 AFF Championship against Timor-Leste.

== Personal life ==
Adam was born to father Swandi Kitto and mother Hamidah Dasuki in 1996. His father was a former Singapore international striker in the 1980s. He started training under former Singapore goalkeeper Yaacob Hashim at the age of 4 with boys older than him.

Adam graduated from the Singapore Sports School in 2010.

Adam is married to Nurul Izzati and they have a son.

In September 2024, after being hospitalised at Ng Teng Fong General Hospital for being unwell, Adam consulted a private cardiologist and was diagnosed with cardiomyopathy. A second opinion with National Heart Centre Singapore confirmed the diagnosis.

== Career statistics ==
As of 23 June 2024

Club	Season	League			Singapore Cup		League Cup Community Shield		Asia Asean		Total	
Club	Season	Division	Apps	Goals	Apps	Goals	Apps	Goals	Apps	Goals	Apps	Goals
Young Lions	2015	S.League	17	3	0	0	0	0	0	0	17	3
Young Lions	2016	S.League	17	1	1	0	0	0	0	0	18	1
Young Lions	Total		34	4	1	0	0	0	0	0	35	4
Home United	2017	S.League	18	4	3	0	0	0	9	3	30	7
Albirex Niigata (S)	2018	Singapore Premier League	22	2	4	2	0	0	0	0	26	4
Home United	2019	Singapore Premier League	13	3	0	0	0	0	7	1	20	3
Lion City Sailors	2020	Singapore Premier League	11	4	0	0	0	0	0	0	11	4
Lion City Sailors	2021	Singapore Premier League	12	0	0	0	0	0	0	0	12	0
Lion City Sailors	2022	Singapore Premier League	17	0	3	0	1	0	4	0	25	0
Lion City Sailors	2023	Singapore Premier League	22	3	6	1	0	0	6	0	34	4
Lion City Sailors	2024–25	Singapore Premier League	9	3	0	0	1	0	0	0	10	2
Lion City Sailors	Total		68	9	9	1	2	0	10	0	168	10
Career total			155	22	12	1	2	0	21	4	203	27

=== International goals ===
Scores and results list Singapore's goal tally first.

No	Date	Venue	Opponent	Score	Result	Competition
1	14 December 2021	National Stadium, Kallang, Singapore	Timor-Leste	1–0	2–0	2020 AFF Championship
2	16 June 2023	National Stadium, Kallang, Singapore	Papua New Guinea	1–0	2–2	Friendly

== Honours ==
=== Club ===
Albirex Niigata (S)

- Singapore Premier League: 2018
- Singapore Cup: 2018
- Singapore Community Shield: 2018

Lion City Sailors

- Singapore Premier League: 2021
- Singapore Community Shield: 2019, 2022, 2024
- Singapore Cup: 2023

=== Individual ===
- Dollah Kassim Award recipients : 2010
- Singapore Premier League Young Player of the Season: 2018
- Singapore Premier League Team of the Year: 2018
