= Fazli Ayob =

Singaporean footballer

Personal information
- Full name: Muhammad Fazli Bin Ayob
- Date of birth: 24 January 1990 (age 36)
- Place of birth: Singapore
- Position: Midfielder

Team information
- Current team: Home United
- Number: 14

Senior career*
Years	Team	Apps	(Gls)
2009–2011	Young Lions	72	(10)
2012–2013	LionsXII	2	(0)
2014	Home United	4	(0)
2015–2016	Balestier Khalsa FC	9	(0)
2017	Tampines Rovers	16	(3)
2018–2020	Home United	1	(0)

International career^{‡}
2010–2016	Singapore	2	(0)
- * Club domestic league appearances and goals ‡ National team caps and goals as of 10 February 2013

Muhammad Fazli bin Ayob (born 24 January 1990) is a Singaporean footballer who plays as a midfielder for Home United FC in the S.League.

== Career statistics ==
=== Club ===
As of 27 July 2019.

Club	Season	League			FA Cup		League		Continental		Total	
Club	Season	Division	Apps	Goals	Apps	Goals	Apps	Goals	Apps	Goals	Apps	Goals
Balestier Khalsa	2016	S.League	18	1	0	0	3	0	6	1	27	2
Balestier Khalsa	Total		18	1	0	0	3	0	6	1	27	2
Tampines Rovers	2017	S.League	16	5	0	0	3	1	3	0	22	6
Tampines Rovers	Total		16	5	0	0	3	1	3	0	22	6
Home United	2018	S.League	5	1	4	0	0	0	8	0	17	1
Home United	2019	Singapore Premier League	0	0	0	0	0	0	1	0	1	0
Home United	Total		5	1	4	0	0	0	9	0	18	1
Career total			8	1	0	0	0	0	2	0	10	0

== Honours ==
=== International ===
Singapore

- AFF Championship: 2012
