= Shamil Sharif =

Singaporean footballer

Personal information
- Full name: Muhammad Shamil bin Sharif
- Date of birth: 5 August 1992 (age 34)
- Place of birth: Singapore
- Height: 1.70 m (5 ft 7 in)
- Position: Midfielder

Team information
- Current team: Warriors
- Number: 7

Youth career
- 2010: Young Lions

Senior career*
Years	Team	Apps	(Gls)
2011	Tanjong Pagar United	19	(2)
2012–2015	Young Lions	59	(5)
2016–2017	Home United	28	(1)
2018–	Warriors		

International career^{‡}
2013–	Singapore U23		
- * Club domestic league appearances and goals as of 13:31, 1 June 2016 (UTC) ‡ National team caps and goals as of 13:31, 1 June 2016 (UTC)

Muhammad Shamil bin Sharif (born 8 May 1992) is a Singaporean professional footballer who currently plays as a midfielder for Warriors in the S.League, Singapore's top tier of professional football.

== International career ==
Shamil currently represents Singapore internationally in the U23 team, having also featured for the U21 and U22 teams previously. He received his first call-up back in 2012 for the 2012 Hassanal Bolkial Trophy tournament, which took place at the Hassanal Bolkial National Stadium in the Philippines. Shamil was also part of the selected Singapore U21 squad that took part in the Vietnam Newspaper Cup 2012, a cup competition hosted annually by the Vietnam Football Federation to prepare the youth players for playing at the U23 level as well as in senior competitive football. Shamil was also named by the Football Association of Singapore the following year in the 20-men squad participating in the Thanh Nien Under-21 International Football Tournament 2013. On 27 May 2015, Shamil was revealed as part of the final 20-men squad selected to play for Singapore in the 2015 Southeast Asian Games.

== Career statistics ==
Club	Season	S.League		Singapore Cup		Singapore League Cup		Asia		Total	
Club	Season	Apps	Goals	Apps	Goals	Apps	Goals	Apps	Goals	Apps	Goals
Tanjong Pagar United	2011	19	2	1	0	0	0	—		20	2
Young Lions	2012	19	0	0	0	2	0	—		21	0
Young Lions	2013	20	1	0	0	3	0	—		23	1
Young Lions	2014	9	3	0	0	0	0	—		9	3
Young Lions	2015	11	1	0	0	0	0	—		11	1
Young Lions	Total	59	5	0	0	5	0	—		64	5
Home United	2016	8	0	1	0	0	0	—		9	0
Home United	2017	8	0	1	0	0	0	—		9	0
Warriors FC	2018	0	0	0	0	0	0	—		0	0
Warriors FC	Total	0	0	0	0	0	0	0	0	0	0
Career total		86	7	2	0	5	0	0	0	93	7
