= Taku Morinaga =

Japanese footballer

Personal information
- Date of birth: 18 May 1995 (age 31)
- Place of birth: Fukuoka, Japan
- Height: 1.53 m (5 ft 0 in)
- Position: Forward

Team information
- Current team: Rudar Pljevlja
- Number: 15

Youth career
- Kokura Minami FC
- Ryutsu Keizai University Kashiwa HS
- 2012–2017: Ryutsu Keizai University

Senior career*
Years	Team	Apps	(Gls)
2018	Albirex Niigata Singapore	24	(11)
2019	Rudar Pljevlja	7	(0)
- * Club domestic league appearances and goals as of 18 March 2025

Taku Morinaga (森永 卓, Morinaga Taku; born 18 May 1995) is a Japanese footballer who plays as a forward.

Morinaga's brother, Masato Morinaga, is also a footballer.

== Career ==
Whilst playing for Ryutsu Keizai University, Morinaga was selected as the MVP of the tournament.

On 4 January 2018, Morinaga was announced at Albirex Niigata Singapore, joining the team from the 2018 season. He scored his first hat trick against Balestier Khalsa on 27 May 2018.

After leaving Rudar Pljevlja, Morinaga has not played professional football since 2019.

== Style of play ==
Morinaga has been described as a forward "who makes a difference with his technique, positioning, and scoring ability.".

== Career statistics ==
=== Club ===
As of 23 July 2018.

Club	Season	League			Cup		Continental		Other		Total	
Club	Season	Division	Apps	Goals	Apps	Goals	Apps	Goals	Apps	Goals	Apps	Goals
Albirex Niigata Singapore	2018	Singapore Premier League	18	9	0	0	–		0	0	18	9
FK Rudar Pljevlja	2019–20	Montenegrin First League	7	0	0	0	–		0	0	7	0
Career total			25	9	0	0	0	0	0	0	25	9
