= Shuhei Sasahara =

Japanese footballer

Personal information
- Date of birth: November 12, 1996 (age 29)
- Place of birth: Kagoshima Prefecture, Japan
- Height: 1.85 m (6 ft 1 in)
- Position: Defender

Youth career
- 2016–2017: Tokai University

Senior career*
Years	Team	Apps	(Gls)
2015	Sagan Tosu	0	(0)
2018–2019	Albirex Niigata Singapore	14	(0)
2020	DPMM FC II	2	(1)
- * Club domestic league appearances and goals as of 12 October 2020

Shuhei Sasahara (笹原 脩平, Sasahara Shūhei; born 22 November 1996) is a Japanese former footballer who played as a defender.

== Playing career ==
Sasahara was born in Kagoshima Prefecture on November 22, 1996. After graduating from high school, he joined J1 League club Sagan Tosu in 2015. However he could not play at all in the match and left the club end of 2015 season. In 2016, he enrolled in Tokai University. In 2018, he signed for Albirex Niigata (S) after graduating from Tokai University.

Sasahara scored his 1st goal for the White Swan in the match against Geylang International on 24 June 2018.

After leaving Albirex, Sasahara transferred to Bruneian club DPMM FC, playing with their second team in the Brunei Super League. He became the second Japanese player to play in Brunei's top flight since Dan Ito in 2008. He scored on his debut via a direct free-kick against Panchor Murai FC on 28 February 2020. He left the club in October after the league was cancelled.

On 4 May 2021, Sasahara announced his retirement from professional football, and is currently employed at a company in his native Kagoshima Prefecture.

笹原 脩平/Shuhei Sasahara
(@s_shuhei1122)
tweeted:

Japanese:

アルビレックス新潟シンガポールからブルネイのBrunei DPMM FCに移籍する事になりました。初めて外国人枠としてサッカーする事に違和感はありますが、責任感を持ちチームに貢献出来るよう頑張ります。応援宜しくお願いします

Translation:

I have transferred from Albirex Niigata Singapore to DPMM FC of Brunei. It feels strange to be playing soccer as a foreign player, but I will do my best to contribute to the team with this responsibility at hand. I welcome your support!

Feb 29, 2020

== Club statistics ==
As of 9 March 2020

Club performance			League		Cup		League Cup		Total	
Season	Club	League	Apps	Goals	Apps	Goals	Apps	Goals	Apps	Goals
2018	Albirex Niigata FC (S)	S.League	23	1	5	0	0	0	28	1
2019	Albirex Niigata FC (S)	Singapore Premier League	20	0	3	0	0	0	23	0
Total
Total	Singapore		43	1	8	0	0	0	51	1
2020	DPMM FC II	Brunei Super League	2	1	0	0	0	0	2	1
Total
Total	Brunei		2	1	0	0	0	0	2	1
Career total			45	2	8	0	0	0	53	2
