= Volodymyr Pryyomov =

Ukrainian footballer (born 1986)

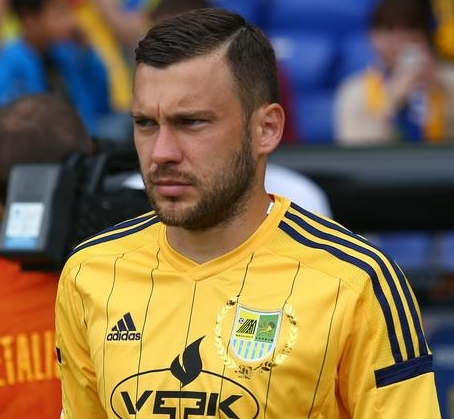
- Pryyomov in 2015

Personal information
- Full name: Volodymyr Volodymyrovych Pryyomov
- Date of birth: 2 January 1986 (age 40)
- Place of birth: Sambir, Ukrainian SSR, Soviet Union
- Height: 1.83 m (6 ft 0 in)
- Position: Forward

Team information
- Current team: FC Dornbreite
- Number: 9

Youth career
- 1998: FC Avanhard Zhovti Vody
- 1998–1999: SC SKA Odesa
- 1999–2000: FC Yunha-Chorne More Odesa
- 2000–2001: Sport School #11 Odesa
- 2001–2002: Sport School #9 Odesa

Senior career*
| Years | Team | Apps | (Gls) |
| 2002–2004 | Energie Cottbus | 0 | (0) |
| 2004 | Ivan Odesa | 2 | (0) |
| 2005 | Saturn Ramenskoye | 0 | (0) |
| 2005–2007 | Metalurh Donetsk | 37 | (4) |
| 2007–2009 | Shakhtar Donetsk | 2 | (0) |
| 2008 | → Chornomorets Odesa (loan) | 7 | (0) |
| 2010 | Krymteplytsia Molodizhne | 8 | (1) |
| 2010 | Oleksandriya | 3 | (0) |
| 2011–2012 | Krylia Sovetov Samara | 29 | (0) |
| 2012–2013 | Kryvbas Kryvyi Rih | 16 | (3) |
| 2013 | Chornomorets Odesa | 14 | (1) |
| 2014 | Metalurh Zaporizhya | 22 | (1) |
| 2015–2016 | Metalist Kharkiv | 35 | (13) |
| 2016–2017 | Persepolis | 10 | (0) |
| 2017 | Oleksandriya | 7 | (0) |
| 2017 | Olimpik Donetsk | 8 | (3) |
| 2018 | DPMM | 23 | (18) |
| 2019 | Vitebsk | 0 | (0) |
| 2020 | Sumy | 0 | (0) |
| 2020–2021 | Skoruk Tomakivka | 12 | (2) |
| 2021 | Balkany Zorya | 29 | (14) |
| 2022 | Tavriya Simferopol | 0 | (0) |
| 2022 | Narva Trans | 31 | (6) |
| 2023 | Dynamo Schwerin | 11 | (4) |
| 2023–2024 | Neumünster | 26 | (14) |
| 2025– | Dornbreite | 24 | (4) |

International career
| 2005–2007 | Ukraine U21 | 16 | (4) |

Managerial career
- 2025–: FC Dornbreite (assistant manager)
- * Club domestic league appearances and goals as of 22 May 2026

Volodymyr Volodymyrovych Pryyomov (Ukrainian: Володимир Володимирович Прийомов; born 2 January 1986) is a Ukrainian footballer who plays as a forward. He is currently assistant to Kevin Wölk at FC Dornbreite of the Landesliga Schleswig-Holstein.

== Career ==
Priyomov started his career with Energie Cottbus in Germany.

He is a former Ukraine national under-21 football team player.

== Honours ==
Skoruk Tomakivka

- Dnipropetrovsk Oblast Championship: 2020–21

Persepolis

- Persian Gulf Pro League: 2016–17

Oleksandriya

- Ukrainian First League: 2010–11

Shakhtar Donetsk

- Ukrainian Premier League: 2007–08
- Ukrainian Cup: 2008
- Ukrainian Super Cup: 2008
- UEFA Cup: 2008–09

Ivan Odesa

- Odesa Oblast cup: 2004

Vitebsk

- Belarusian Cup: Runner-Up 2018–19
