= Izzdin Shafiq =

Singaporean footballer (born 1990)

Personal information
- Full name: Muhammad Izzdin Shafiq bin Yacob
- Date of birth: 14 December 1990 (age 35)
- Place of birth: Singapore
- Height: 1.75 m (5 ft 9 in)
- Position: Midfielder

Team information
- Current team: Geylang International
- Number: 13

Senior career*
Years	Team	Apps	(Gls)
2008–2011	Young Lions	70	(1)
2012	LionsXII	12	(0)
2013	Home United	20	(3)
2014–2015	LionsXII	5	(0)
2016	Tampines Rovers	23	(0)
2017–2020	Lion City Sailors	101	(2)
2021–	Geylang International	9	(0)

International career^{‡}
2015–	Singapore	39	(0)
Medal record
Men's football
Representing Singapore
Sea Games
Bronze medal – third place	Sea Games 2013	Football
- * Club domestic league appearances and goals as of 14 May 2021 ‡ National team caps and goals as of 24 March 2019

Muhammad Izzdin Shafiq bin Yacob (born 14 December 1990) is a Singaporean professional footballer who plays for Singapore Premier League club Geylang International FC. He played for the Singapore Selection XI at the 2015 Premier League Asia Trophy.

Izzdin is considered one of the top 5 players during Matchday 6 in the AFC Asian Cup 2018 in an article by FOX Sports Asia.

== Club career ==
=== Young Lions ===
Izzdin began his professional football career with Under-23 side Young Lions in the S.League in 2009.

=== LionsXII ===
In December 2011, the FAS announced that Izzdin was to join the newly formed LionsXII for the 2012 Malaysia Super League.

=== Home United ===
The following year, in 2013, Izzdin left the LionsXII and signed for Home United for the 2013 S.League campaign.

=== LionsXII(2014-2015) ===
It was then announced that Izzdin would return to LionsXII for 2014 and 2015 Malaysia Super League. However, after the 2015 campaign, the club was disbanded.

=== Tampines Rovers ===
After the disbandment, Izzdin signed for Tampines Rovers in 2016.

=== Home United ===
Izzdin then signed for Home United for the 2017 S.League season.

== Career statistics ==
As at 10 Oct 2021

Club	Season	S.League		Singapore Cup		Singapore League Cup		Asia		Total	
Club	Season	Apps	Goals	Apps	Goals	Apps	Goals	Apps	Goals	Apps	Goals
Tampines Rovers	2016	23	0	5	0	0	0	10	0	38	0
Tampines Rovers	Total	23	0	5	0	0	0	10	0	38	0
Home United	2017	17	0	3	0	3	0	7	1	30	1
Home United	2018	23	2	4	0	0	0	10	1	37	3
Home United	2019	7	1	0	0	0	0	7	0	14	1
Home United	Total	47	3	7	0	3	0	24	2	81	5
Lion City Sailors	2020	12	0	0	0	0	0	0	0	12	0
Lion City Sailors	Total	12	0	0	0	0	0	0	0	12	0
Geylang International	2021	15	0	0	0	0	0	0	0	15	0
Geylang International	Total	15	0	0	0	0	0	0	0	15	0
Career total		96	0	12	0	3	0	34	2	145	2
