= 2018 Singapore Premier League =

Singapore Premier League
- Season: 2018
- Dates: 31 March 2018 – 3 October 2018
- Champions: Albirex Niigata (S) (3rd title)
- Community Shield: Albirex Niigata (S)
- AFC Champions League: Home United (S.League runners-up)
- AFC Cup: Tampines Rovers (S.League 4th Place)
- Matches: 79
- Goals: 248 (3.14 per match)
- Top goalscorer: Shuhei Hoshino (18 goals)
- Biggest home win: Albirex Niigata (S) 5–0 Balestier Khalsa (28 May 2018) Albirex Niigata (S) 5–0 DPMM FC (3 June 2018)
- Biggest away win: Home United FC 1–6 Albirex Niigata (S) (18 April 2018)
- Highest scoring: Geylang International 2–6 DPMM FC (10 June 2018)
- Longest winning run: 17 matches Albirex Niigata (S)
- Longest unbeaten run: 24 matches Albirex Niigata (S)
- Longest winless run: 13 matches Hougang United FC
- Longest losing run: 5 matches Geylang International

The 2018 Singapore Premier League (also known as the Great Eastern Hyundai Singapore Premier League due to sponsorship reasons) was the inaugural season of the Singapore Premier League, the top-flight Singaporean professional league for association football clubs. The season began on 31 March 2018, and concluded on 3 October 2018. Albirex Niigata (S) won the league and successfully defended their title.

Each team will receive $888,200 if they meet key performance indicators that will be made known to them before the 31 March kick-off. This represents a "19 per cent reduction from the 2017 season", but funding for the league has been secured for the next five years.

It is the league's first season after rebranding from the S.League to the Singapore Premier League. A major overhaul from the new FAS management is being made from this season onwards to improve the standard of Singapore football.

An emphasis on youth development from the ground up is underway.

== Rules ==
The following key changes are being made to the rules for the 2018 season:

1. It is compulsory for each of the SPL's six local clubs to recruit at least six Under-23 footballers for their squad, with a minimum of three Under-23 players to feature in the starting 11 for each match. The first U-23 player must be replaced by another, if the substitution occurs in the 1st half. Beyond this, any U-23 players can be replaced by any other players.
2. Depending on the squad size, each team is to sign at least eight local players aged 24 to 30. A 25-man squad will need to have nine local U-23 players and 10 local players aged 24 to 30.
3. Introduction of age quotas, with teams allowed to sign only two to six players above the age of 30, depending on squad size. For example, for squad between 19 and 22 players, there must be minimum of six under-23 players and 8 under-30 players. This will apply to all club except Young Lions and Albirex Niigata (S).
4. Young Lions can sign a maximum of 33 players for the season.
5. The foreign player quota for clubs will be reduced from three to two with no age restriction placed on them.
6. Albirex Niigata (S) has age restrictions imposed by the FAS for the new season. The squad will be made up of 50% of U23 players, 50% of U21 players and one player of any age. This is excluding 2 Singapore U-23 players which they can choose to sign.
7. The Singapore Premier League lineup for 2018 will remain the same as Young Lions are set to compete in 2018.
8. The Prime League will be scrapped with the National Football League (NFL) set to be installed as the second-tier competition.
9. Yo-yo test will replace the current mandatory 2.4 km test, and players will be tested three times a year in the pre-season, midseason and off-season.
10. All matches will be played during weekends at 5:30 p.m.

== Teams ==
A total of 9 teams compete in the league. Albirex Niigata (S) and DPMM FC are invited foreign clubs from Japan and Brunei respectively. Despite large criticism and discussion against the Young Lions project, the Young Lions will continue to compete till 2019 for the purposes of training and preparing for the 2019 SEA Games. The criticism mainly focused on the poor performances every season by the largely youth team made up of Singapore Football's brightest prospects. Season-long consecutive losses against the rest of the more mature teams inflicts serious long-term consequences on the morale of the players, considering that most of these players are in the developmental ages of their footballing career. The new age restrictions imposed on the rest of the Singapore Premier League clubs could be seen as giving the Young Lions a better advantage in terms of seniority, but most critics and fans of Singapore football are still wanting the FAS to abolish the FAS-managed Young Lions and have them developed under the guidance of genuine local clubs.

=== Stadiums and locations ===
Location of 2018 Singapore Premier League teams
Locations of the 2018 Singapore Premier League teams from Singapore

Team	Stadium	Capacity
Albirex Niigata (S)	Jurong East Stadium	2,700
Balestier Khalsa	Toa Payoh Stadium	3,800
DPMM FC	Hassanal Bolkiah National Stadium	28,000
Geylang International	Bedok Stadium	3,800
Home United	Bishan Stadium	3,500
Hougang United	Hougang Stadium	3,400
Tampines Rovers	Our Tampines Hub	5,000
Warriors FC	Choa Chu Kang Stadium	4,000
Young Lions	Jalan Besar Stadium	6,000

=== Personnel and sponsors ===
Note: Flags indicate national team as has been defined under FIFA eligibility rules. Players may hold more than one non-FIFA nationality.

Team	Head coach	Captain	Kit manufacturer	Main Shirt sponsor
Albirex Niigata (S)	(Japan) Kazuaki Yoshinaga	(Japan) Wataru Murofushi	Hummel	Canon
Balestier Khalsa	(Croatia) Marko Kraljević	(Singapore) Zaiful Nizam	Mawin	Jeep
DPMM FC	(Brazil) Renê Weber	(Brunei) Shahrazen Said	Lotto	–
Geylang International	(Japan) Hirotaka Usui	(Japan) Yuki Ichikawa	FBT	Epson
Home United	(Singapore) Aidil Sharin	(Singapore) Izzdin Shafiq	Puma	Lionco Investments
Hougang United	(Singapore) Philippe Aw	(Singapore) Nurhilmi Jasni	Vonda	Assisi Hospice
Tampines Rovers	(Germany) Jürgen Raab	(Singapore) Fahrudin Mustafić	Hummel	– / ANA Courier Express
Warriors FC	(Croatia) Mirko Grabovac	(Japan) Kento Fukuda	Umbro	Rhino Sports / Armaggeddon
Young Lions	(Singapore) Fandi Ahmad	(Singapore) Taufiq Muqminin	Nike	-

Note: 1) ANA Courier Express is Tampines Rovers's Singapore Cup jersey sponsor only 2) Hougang United had a partnership with Assisi Hospice via its donation drive. Assisi Hospice will be published on the jersey

=== Coaching changes ===
Team	Outgoing Head Coach	Manner of Departure	Date of Vacancy	Position in table	Incoming Head Coach	Date of appointment
DPMM FC	(Scotland) Steve Kean	Sacked	30 November 2017	Pre-Season	(Brazil) Renê Weber	1 January 2018
Young Lions	(Singapore) Vincent Subramaniam	Redeployed	14 December 2017	Pre-Season	(Singapore) Fandi Ahmad	14 December 2017
Warriors FC	(Singapore) Razif Onn	Redeployed	1 January 2018	Pre-Season	(Croatia) Mirko Grabovac	15 January 2018
Geylang International	(Singapore) Mohd Noor Ali	Redeployed	1 February 2018	Pre-Season	(Japan) Hirotaka Usui	1 February 2018
Hougang United	(Singapore) Philippe Aw	Sacked	10 June 2018	9th	(Singapore) Clement Teo (Caretaker)	10 June 2018

=== Foreigners ===
The foreign player quota for clubs was reduced from three to two.

In addition, Albirex was reported to have declared their intention to have Singapore players in their squad for 2018 and is understood that a proposal is being put together for Albirex to take in local players and they will be allowed to sign two Singaporean U-23 players. Only DPMM are allowed to sign up to three foreigners.

Players name in bold indicates the player was registered during the mid-season transfer window.

Club	Player 1	Player 2	Player 3	Youth Players 1	Youth Players 2	Former Players
Albirex Niigata (S)	(Singapore) Shahul Rayyan	(Singapore) Adam Swandi				
Balestier Khalsa	(Croatia) Vedran Mesec	(New Zealand) Keegan Linderboom		(Serbia) Dusan Marinkovic	(Austria) Sanjin Vrebac	
DPMM FC	(Iran) Mojtaba Esmaeilzadeh	(Northern Ireland) Brian McLean	(Ukraine) Volodymyr Pryyomov			
Geylang International	(Japan) Yuki Ichikawa	(Japan) Fumiya Kogure				
Home United	(Australia) **Isaka Cernak**	(South Korea) Song Ui-young				(France) Sirina Camara
Hougang United	(Italy) Antoine Viterale	(South Korea) **Jang Jo-yoon**				(England) Adam Mitter
Tampines Rovers	(Canada) Jordan Webb	(Japan) Ryutaro Megumi				
Warriors FC	(France) Jonathan Béhé	(Japan) Kento Fukuda				

== League table ==
Pos	Team	Pld	W	D	L	GF	GA	GD	Pts	Qualification or relegation
1	Albirex Niigata (S) (Note: The two foreign clubs – Albirex Niigata (S) and DPMM FC – as well as the Football Association of Singapore (FAS) under-21 team, Young Lions, are ineligible for any AFC competition spots.) (C)	24	21	3	0	69	17	+52	66	
2	Home United	24	12	7	5	48	36	+12	43	Qualification to AFC Champions League Preliminary Round 1
3	DPMM FC	24	11	8	5	46	38	+8	41	
4	Tampines Rovers	24	12	4	8	43	27	+16	40	Qualification to AFC Cup Group Stage
5	Warriors FC	24	7	7	10	32	35	−3	28	
6	Balestier Khalsa	24	7	6	11	25	36	−11	27	
7	Young Lions	24	5	6	13	25	46	−21	21	
8	Geylang International	24	5	5	14	26	57	−31	20	
9	Hougang United	24	2	6	16	22	44	−22	12	

Updated to match(es) played on 29 September 2018. Source: Singapore Premier League
Rules for classification: 1) points; 2) goal difference; 3) number of goals scored; 4) number of wins
(C) Champions

== Statistics ==
=== Top scorers ===
As of 3 October 2018.

Rank	Player	Club	Goals
1	(Japan) Shuhei Hoshino	Albirex Niigata (S)	19
2	(France) Jonathan Behe	Warriors FC	17
3	(Ukraine) Volodymyr Pryyomov	DPMM FC	17
4	(Singapore) Khairul Amri	Tampines Rovers	15
5	(Singapore) Shahril Ishak	Home United	13

=== Clean Sheets ===
As of 3 October 2018.

Rank	Player	Club	Goals
1	(Japan) Yōsuke Nozawa	Albirex Niigata (S)	10
2	(Singapore) Syazwan Buhari	Tampines Rovers	9
3	(Singapore) Rudy Khairullah	Home United	5
3	(Singapore) Mukundan Maran	Warriors FC	5
5	(Singapore) Zaiful Nizam	Balestier Khalsa	4

=== Hat-tricks ===
Player	For	Against	Result	Date	Reference
(Japan) Taku Morinaga	Albirex Niigata (S)	Balestier Khalsa	5–0	27 May 2018	
(France) Jonathan Béhé	Warriors FC	Tampines Rovers	3–2	17 June 2018	
(Singapore) Khairul Amri	Tampines Rovers	Balestier Khalsa	5–2	30 June 2018	
(Singapore) Khairul Amri	Tampines Rovers	Geylang International	4–1	21 July 2018	
(Brunei) Abdul Azizi Ali Rahman	Brunei DPMM	Hougang United	3–1	18 August 2018	
(South Korea) Song Ui-young	Home United	Warriors FC	4–3	23 September 2018	

== Singapore Premier League Awards night winners ==
Awards	Winners	Club
Player of the Year	(Japan) Wataru Murofushi	Albirex Niigata (S)
Young Player of the Year	(Singapore) Adam Swandi	Albirex Niigata (S)
Coach of the Year	(Japan) Kazuaki Yoshinaga	Albirex Niigata (S)
Top Scorer Award	(Japan) Shuhei Hoshino	Albirex Niigata (S)
Goal of the Year	(Singapore) Zulfadhmi Suzliman	Tampines Rovers
Fair Play Award	Albirex Niigata (S)	
Referee of the Year	(Singapore) Nathan Chan	—N/a

FansXI Team of the Year
Goalkeeper	(Japan) Yosuke Nozawa (Albirex Niigata (S))			
Defence	(Japan) Riku Moriyasu (Albirex Niigata (S))	(Japan) Shuhei Sasahara (Albirex Niigata (S))	(Japan) Kento Fukuda (Warriors FC)	(Japan) Kenya Takahashi (Albirex Niigata (S))
Midfield	(Singapore) Hafiz Nor (Home United)	(Japan) Wataru Murofushi (Albirex Niigata (S))	(South Korea) Song Ui-young (Home United)	(Singapore) Adam Swandi (Albirex Niigata (S))
Attack	(Singapore) Shahril Ishak (Home United)		(Japan) Shuhei Hoshino (Albirex Niigata (S))	
