= 2024 in association football =

The following are the scheduled events of association football for the calendar year 2024 throughout the world. This includes:

- In countries whose league seasons fall within a single calendar year, the 2024 season.
- In countries which crown one champion in a season that spans two calendar years, the 2023–24 season.
- In countries which split their league season into two championships, a system often known in Latin America as Apertura and Clausura, all championships awarded in calendar 2024.

== Events ==
=== Men's national teams ===
==== FIFA ====
- 15–25 February: 2024 FIFA Beach Soccer World Cup in United Arab Emirates
  - (gold) : Brazil
  - (silver) : Italy
  - (bronze) : Iran
  - 4th: Belarus
- 24 July – 9 August: Football at the 2024 Summer Olympics in France
  - (gold) : Spain
  - (silver) : France
  - (bronze) : Morocco
  - 4th: Egypt
- 14 September – 6 October: 2024 FIFA Futsal World Cup in Uzbekistan
  - (gold) : Brazil
  - (silver) : Argentina
  - (bronze) : Ukraine
  - 4th: France

==== AFC ====
- 12 January – 10 February: 2023 AFC Asian Cup in Qatar
  - (gold) : Qatar
  - (silver) : Jordan
- 15 April – 3 May: 2024 AFC U-23 Asian Cup in Qatar
  - (gold) : Japan
  - (silver) : Uzbekistan
  - (bronze) : Iraq
  - 4th: Indonesia
- 17–28 April: 2024 AFC Futsal Asian Cup in Thailand
  - (gold) : Iran
  - (silver) : Thailand
  - (bronze) : Uzbekistan
  - 4th: Tajikistan

===== AGCFF =====
- 21 December – 3 January 2025: 26th Arabian Gulf Cup in Kuwait

===== WAFF =====
- 20–26 March: 2024 WAFF U-23 Championship in Saudi Arabia
  - (gold) : South Korea
  - (silver) : Australia
  - (bronze) : Saudi Arabia
  - 4th: Egypt
- 25 June – 5 July: 2024 WAFF U-19 Championship in Saudi Arabia
  - (gold) : Saudi Arabia
  - (silver) : United Arab Emirates
- 2–11 September: 2024 WAFF U-16 Championship in Jordan
  - (gold) : Syria
  - (silver) : Saudi Arabia

===== CAFA =====
- 5–12 July: 2024 CAFA U-20 Championship in Kyrgyzstan
  - (gold) : Iran
  - (silver) : Kyrgyzstan
  - (bronze) : Uzbekistan
  - 4th: Tajikistan

===== ASEAN =====
- 24–28 March: 2024 NSDF Futsal Championship in Thailand
  - (gold) : Thailand
  - (silver) : Australia
  - (bronze) : Afghanistan
  - 4th: Malaysia
- 17–29 July: 2024 ASEAN U-19 Boys Championship in Indonesia
  - (gold) : Indonesia
  - (silver) : Thailand
  - (bronze) : Australia
  - 4th: Malaysia
- 2–10 November: 2024 ASEAN Futsal Championship in Thailand
  - (gold) : Indonesia
  - (silver) : Vietnam
  - (bronze) : Thailand
  - 4th: Australia

==== CAF ====
- 13 January – 11 February: 2023 Africa Cup of Nations in Ivory Coast
  - (gold) : Ivory Coast
  - (silver) : Nigeria
  - (bronze) : South Africa
  - 4th: DR Congo
- 8–23 March: Football at the 2023 African Games in Ghana
  - (gold) : Ghana
  - (silver) : Uganda
  - (bronze) : Senegal
  - 4th: Congo
- 11–21 April: 2024 Futsal Africa Cup of Nations in Morocco
  - (gold) : Morocco
  - (silver) : Angola
  - (bronze) : Libya
  - 4th: Egypt

===== COSAFA =====
- 17–23 March: 2023 COSAFA Beach Soccer Championship in South Africa
  - (gold) : Morocco
  - (silver) : Mozambique
  - (bronze) : Malawi
  - 4th: Saudi Arabia
- 26 September – 5 October: 2024 COSAFA U-20 Cup in Mozambique
  - (gold) : South Africa
  - (silver) : Zambia
- 5–14 December: 2024 COSAFA Under-17 Championship in Mozambique
  - (gold) : Zambia
  - (silver) : Angola

===== CECAFA =====
- 6–20 October: 2024 CECAFA U-20 Championship in Tanzania
  - (gold) : Tanzania
  - (silver) : Kenya
  - (bronze) : Uganda
  - 4th: Burundi

===== UNAF =====
- 18–26 April: 2024 UNAF U-17 Tournament in Algeria
  - (gold) : Egypt
  - (silver) : Algeria
  - (bronze) : Morocco
  - 4th: Tunisia
- 11–23 November: 2024 UNAF U-17 Tournament in Morocco
  - (gold) : Egypt
  - (silver) : Morocco
  - (bronze) : Tunisia
  - 4th: Algeria
- 14–26 November: 2024 UNAF U-20 Tournament in Egypt
  - (gold) : Morocco
  - (silver) : Egypt
  - (bronze) : Tunisia
  - 4th: Algeria

==== CONCACAF ====
- 21–24 March: 2024 CONCACAF Nations League Finals in United States
  - (gold) : United States
  - (silver) : Mexico
  - (bronze) : Jamaica
  - 4th: Panama
- April 13–20: 2024 CONCACAF Futsal Championship in (Nicaragua) Managua
  - (gold) : Panama
  - (silver) : Cuba
  - (bronze) : Guatemala
  - 4th: Costa Rica
- 19 July – 4 August: 2024 CONCACAF U-20 Championship in Mexico
  - (gold) : Mexico
  - (silver) : United States

==== CONMEBOL ====
- 20 January – 11 February: 2024 CONMEBOL Pre-Olympic Tournament in Venezuela
  - (gold) : Paraguay
  - (silver) : Argentina
  - (bronze) : Brazil
  - 4th: Venezuela
- 2–10 February: 2024 Copa América de Futsal in Paraguay
  - (gold) : Brazil
  - (silver) : Argentina
  - (bronze) : Venezuela
  - 4th: Paraguay
- 20 June – 14 July: 2024 Copa América in United States
  - (gold) : Argentina
  - (silver) : Colombia
  - (bronze) : Uruguay
  - 4th: Canada
- 17–25 August: 2024 South American U-17 Futsal Championship in Paraguay
  - (gold) : Argentina
  - (silver) : Brazil
  - (bronze) : Venezuela
  - 4th: Bolivia
- 4–19 October: 2023 South American U-15 Championship in Bolivia
  - (gold) : Paraguay
  - (silver) : Ecuador
  - (bronze) : Argentina
  - 4th: Chile
- 16–24 November: 2024 South American U-20 Futsal Championship in Peru
  - (gold) : Argentina
  - (silver) : Colombia
  - (bronze) : Brazil
  - 4th: Paraguay

==== OFC ====
- 15–30 June: 2024 OFC Men's Nations Cup in Fiji and Vanuatu
  - (gold) : New Zealand
  - (silver) : Vanuatu
  - (bronze) : Tahiti
  - 4th: Fiji
- 7–20 July: 2024 OFC U-19 Men's Championship in Samoa
  - (gold) : New Zealand
  - (silver) : New Caledonia
  - (bronze) : Solomon Islands
  - 4th: Fiji
- 28 July – 10 August: 2024 OFC U-16 Men's Championship in Tahiti
  - (gold) : New Zealand
  - (silver) : Fiji
  - (bronze) : New Caledonia
  - 4th: Tahiti
- 20–26 October: 2024 OFC Beach Soccer Men's Nations Cup in Solomon Islands
  - (gold) : Tahiti
  - (silver) : Solomon Islands
  - (bronze) : Fiji
  - 4th: Papua New Guinea

==== UEFA ====
- 20 May – 5 June: 2024 UEFA European Under-17 Championship in Cyprus
  - (gold) : Italy
  - (silver) : Portugal
- 14 June – 14 July: UEFA Euro 2024 in Germany
  - (gold) : Spain
  - (silver) : England
- 15–28 July: 2024 UEFA European Under-19 Championship in Northern Ireland
  - (gold) : Spain
  - (silver) : France
- 10–15 September: 2024 Euro Beach Soccer League (Super Final) in Italy
  - (gold) : Portugal
  - (silver) : Italy
  - (bronze) : Belarus
  - 4th: Spain

==== International men's tournaments ====
- 21–26 March: 2024 FIFA Series in Algeria, Azerbaijan, Egypt, Saudi Arabia and Sri Lanka
  - FIFA Series: Algeria
    - (gold) : Algeria
    - (silver) : Bolivia
    - (bronze) : South Africa
    - 4th: Andorra
  - FIFA Series: Azerbaijan
    - (gold) : Bulgaria
    - (silver) : Azerbaijan
    - (bronze) : Tanzania
    - 4th: Mongolia
  - FIFA Series: Egypt
    - (gold) : Croatia
    - (silver) : Egypt
    - (bronze) : Tunisia
    - 4th: New Zealand
  - FIFA Series: Saudi Arabia A
    - (gold) : Cape Verde
    - (silver) : Guyana
    - (bronze) : Equatorial Guinea
    - 4th: Cambodia
  - FIFA Series: Saudi Arabia B
    - (gold) : Guinea
    - (silver) : Brunei
    - (bronze) : Bermuda
    - 4th: Vanuatu
  - FIFA Series: Sri Lanka
    - (gold) : Central African Republic
    - (silver) : Sri Lanka
    - (bronze) : Papua New Guinea
    - 4th: Bhutan
- 21–26 March: 2024 The International Youth Warriors Tournament in Algeria
    - (gold) : Tunisia
    - (silver) : Algeria
    - (bronze) : Egypt
    - 4th: Mauritania
- 21–26 March: 2024 Under-20 Four Nations Tournament in Malawi
  - (gold) : Malawi
  - (silver) : Kenya
  - (bronze) : Zimbabwe
- 23–26 March: 2024 Four Nations Football Tournament in Malawi
  - (gold) : Kenya
  - (silver) : Zimbabwe
  - (bronze) : Zambia
  - 4th: Malawi
- 3–16 June: 2024 Maurice Revello Tournament in France
  - (gold) : Ukraine
  - (silver) : Ivory Coast
  - (bronze) : Italy
  - 4th: France
- 6–9 June: 2024 Under-21 Baltic Cup in Estonia, Latvia, and Lithuania
  - (gold) : Latvia
  - (silver) : Estonia
  - (bronze) : Finland
  - 4th: Lithuania
- 7–11 June: 2024 Under-19 Baltic Cup in Estonia, Latvia, and Lithuania
  - (gold) : Latvia
  - (silver) : Estonia
  - (bronze) : Lithuania
- 8–11 June: 2024 Baltic Cup in Estonia, Latvia, and Lithuania
  - (gold) : Estonia
  - (silver) : Lithuania
  - (bronze) : Latvia
  - 4th: Faroe Islands
- 13–17 August: 2024 Telki Cup in Hungary
  - (gold) : Italy
  - (silver) : Iceland
  - (bronze) : South Korea
  - 4th: Hungary
- 28 August – 1 September: 2024 Seoul Earth On Us Cup in South Korea
  - (gold) : South Korea
  - (silver) : Argentina
  - (bronze) : Thailand
  - 4th: Indonesia
- 2–8 September: 2024 FIFA Tri-Nations Football Tournament in Fiji
  - (gold) : Hong Kong
  - (silver) : Fiji
  - (bronze) : Solomon Islands
- 2–10 September: 2024 Slovenia Nations Cup in Slovenia
  - (gold) : France
  - (silver) : Iceland
  - (bronze) : Poland
  - 4th: Qatar
- 2–10 September: 2024 Syrenka Cup in Poland
  - (gold) : Norway
  - (silver) : Romania
  - (bronze) : Poland
  - 4th: Montenegro
- 3–9 September: 2024 Intercontinental Cup in India
  - (gold) : Syria
  - (silver) : Mauritius
  - (bronze) : India
- 3–9 September: 2024 International 'City of Trieste' Tournament in Italy
  - (gold) : Spain
  - (silver) : Italy
  - (bronze) : Portugal
  - 4th: Switzerland
- 4–8 September: 2024 Merdeka Tournament in Malaysia
  - (gold) : Malaysia
  - (silver) : Lebanon
  - (bronze) : Tajikistan
  - 4th: Philippines
- 4–8 September: 2024 Lafarge Foot Avenir in France
  - (gold) : Portugal
  - (silver) : England
  - (bronze) : France
  - 4th: Switzerland
- 4–8 September: 2024 Ježek Cup in Czech Republic
  - (gold) : Germany
  - (silver) : United States
  - (bronze) : Wales
  - 4th: Turkey
- 5–10 September: 2024 LPBank Cup in Vietnam
  - (gold) : Russia
  - (silver) : Thailand
  - (bronze) : Vietnam
- 5–11 September: 2024 Memorial Football Tournament Stevan Ćele Vilotić in Serbia
  - (gold) : Portugal
  - (silver) : Hungary
  - (bronze) : Montenegro
  - 4th: Serbia
- 11–14 October: 2024 King's Cup in Thailand
  - (gold) : Thailand
  - (silver) : Syria
  - (bronze) : Philippines
  - 4th: Tajikistan
- 13–18 November: 2024 Panda Cup in China
  - (gold) : Australia
  - (silver) : Kyrgyzstan
  - (bronze) : China
  - 4th: Mongolia
- 9–21 December: 2024 MSG Prime Minister's Cup in Solomon Islands
  - (gold) : Papua New Guinea
  - (silver) : Fiji
  - (bronze) : Solomon Islands
  - 4th: Vanuatu

==== International men's futsal tournaments ====
- 31 January – 4 February: 2024 Futsal Week February Cup in Croatia
  - (gold) : Denmark
  - (silver) : San Marino
  - (bronze) : Greenland
  - 4th: Malta
- 10–14 April: 2024 Futsal Week April Cup in Croatia
  - (gold) : Italy
  - (silver) : Venezuela
  - (bronze) : Bosnia and Herzegovina
  - 4th: Turkey
- 11–13 June: 2024 Futsal Week June Cup in Croatia
  - (gold) : Poland
  - (silver) : Czech Republic
- 31 August – 6 September: 2024 Continental Futsal Championship in Thailand
  - (gold) : Thailand
  - (silver) : Guatemala
  - (bronze) : Kuwait
  - 4th: Afghanistan
- 23–26 October: 2024 Montaigu Futsal Cup in Portugal
  - (gold) : Portugal
  - (silver) : France
  - (bronze) : Japan
  - 4th: Croatia
- 3–4 November: 2024 Futsal Week November Challenge in Croatia
  - (gold) : Romania
  - (silver) : Bulgaria
- 4–6 November: 2024 Budaörs Futsal Cup in Hungary
  - (gold) : Hungary
  - (silver) : Belarus
  - (bronze) : Kuwait

=== Women's national teams ===
==== FIFA ====
- 25 July – 10 August: Football at the 2024 Summer Olympics in France
  - (gold) : United States
  - (silver) : Brazil
  - (bronze) : Germany
  - 4th: Spain
- 31 August – 22 September: 2024 FIFA U-20 Women's World Cup in Colombia
  - (gold) : North Korea
  - (silver) : Japan
  - (bronze) : United States
  - 4th: Netherlands
- 16 October – 3 November: 2024 FIFA U-17 Women's World Cup in Dominican Republic
  - (gold) :North Korea
  - (silver) :Spain
  - (bronze) :United States
  - 4th:England

==== AFC ====
- 3–16 March: 2024 AFC U-20 Women's Asian Cup in Uzbekistan
  - (gold) : North Korea
  - (silver) : Japan
  - (bronze) : Australia
  - 4th: South Korea
- 6-19 May: 2024 AFC U-17 Women's Asian Cup in Indonesia
  - (gold) : North Korea
  - (silver) : Japan
  - (bronze) : South Korea
  - 4th: China

===== WAFF =====
- 19–29 February: 2024 WAFF Women's Championship in Saudi Arabia
  - (gold) : Jordan
  - (silver) : Nepal
- 28 November – 6 December: 2024 WAFF U-18 Girls Championship in Jordan
  - (gold) : Jordan
  - (silver) : Lebanon
  - (bronze) : Palestine
  - 4th: Saudi Arabia
- TBD: 2024 U-16 Girls' Championship

===== SAFF =====
- 2–8 February: 2024 SAFF U-19 Women's Championship in Bangladesh
  - (gold) : India
  - (silver) : Bangladesh
- 1–10 March: 2024 SAFF U-16 Women's Championship in Nepal
  - (gold) : Bangladesh
  - (silver) : India

===== ASEAN =====
- 16–21 November: 2024 ASEAN Women's Futsal Championship in Philippines
  - (gold) : Vietnam
  - (silver) : Thailand
  - (bronze) : Indonesia
  - 4th: Myanmar

===== CAFA =====
- 2–12 February: 2024 CAFA Women's Futsal Championship in Tajikistan
  - (gold) : Iran
  - (silver) : Uzbekistan
  - (bronze) : Kyrgyzstan
- 19–28 April: 2024 CAFA U-18 Women's Championship in Tajikistan
  - (gold) : Iran
  - (silver) : Uzbekistan
  - (bronze) : Kyrgyzstan
- 21–25 May: 2024 CAFA U-15 Girls Championship in Tajikistan
  - (gold) : Iran
  - (silver) : Uzbekistan
  - (bronze) : Kyrgyzstan
  - 4th: Tajikistan

==== CAF ====
- 8–21 March: Football at the 2023 African Games – Women's tournament in Ghana
  - (gold) : Ghana
  - (silver) : Nigeria
  - (bronze) : Uganda
  - 4th: Senegal

===== UNIFFAC =====
- 13–15 February 2024: 2024 UNIFFAC U-20 Women's Cup in Cameroon
  - (gold) : Cameroon
  - (silver) : Congo

===== WAFU =====
- 20–30 May 2024: 2024 WAFU Zone A U-20 Women's Cup in Senegal
  - (gold) : Senegal
  - (silver) : Guinea-Bissau
  - (bronze) : Liberia
  - 4th: Guinea
- 12–22 December: 2024 WAFU Zone B U17 Women's Cup in Ghana
  - (gold) : Ghana
  - (silver) : Nigeria
  - (bronze) : Benin
  - 4th: Ivory Coast

===== COSAFA =====
- 22 October – 2 November: 2024 COSAFA Women's Championship in South Africa
  - (gold) : Zambia
  - (silver) : South Africa
- 19–24 November: 2024 COSAFA U-20 Women's Championship in South Africa
  - (gold) : Zambia
  - (silver) : South Africa
- 4–13 December: 2024 COSAFA U-17 Girls' Championship in South Africa
  - (gold) : Zambia
  - (silver) : Lesotho

===== UNAF =====
- 3–7 September: 2024 UNAF U-17 Women's Tournament in Tunisia
  - (gold) : Tanzania
  - (silver) : Tunisia
  - (bronze) : Morocco
  - 4th: Egypt

==== CONCACAF ====
- 1–11 February: 2024 CONCACAF Women's U-17 Championship in Mexico
  - (gold) : United States
  - (silver) : Mexico
  - (bronze) : Canada
  - 4th: Haiti
- 20 February – 10 March: 2024 CONCACAF W Gold Cup in United States
  - (gold) : United States
  - (silver) : Brazil

==== CONMEBOL ====
- 13–31 March: 2024 South American Under-17 Women's Football Championship in Argentina
  - (gold) : Brazil
  - (silver) : Colombia
  - (bronze) : Ecuador
  - 4th: Paraguay
- 11 April – 5 May: 2024 South American Under-20 Women's Football Championship in Ecuador
  - (gold) : Brazil
  - (silver) : Paraguay
  - (bronze) : Colombia
  - 4th: Argentina
- 26 October – 3 November: 2024 South American Under-20 Women's Futsal Championship in Paraguay
  - (gold) : Colombia
  - (silver) : Brazil
  - (bronze) : Argentina
  - 4th: Uruguay

==== OFC ====
- 7–19 February: 2024 OFC Women's Olympic Qualifying Tournament in Samoa
  - (gold) : New Zealand
  - (silver) : Solomon Islands
- 17–25 August: 2024 OFC Futsal Women's Nations Cup in Solomon Islands
  - (gold) : New Zealand
  - (silver) : Fiji
  - (bronze) Tahiti
  - 4th Solomon Islands
- 8–21 September: 2024 OFC U-16 Women's Championship in Fiji
  - (gold) : New Zealand
  - (silver) : Samoa
  - (bronze) Tonga
  - 4th New Caledonia

==== UEFA ====
- 21–28 February: 2023–24 UEFA Women's Nations League Finals in Spain、France and Netherlands
  - (gold) : Spain
  - (silver) : France
  - (bronze) : Germany
  - 4th: Netherlands
- 5–18 May: 2024 UEFA Women's Under-17 Championship in Sweden
  - (gold) : Spain
  - (silver) : England
  - (bronze) : Poland
  - 4th: France
- 14–27 July: 2024 UEFA Women's Under-19 Championship in Lithuania
  - (gold) : Spain
  - (silver) : Netherlands
- 10–15 September: 2024 Women's Euro Beach Soccer League (Super final) in Italy
  - (gold) : Poland
  - (silver) : Portugal
  - (bronze) : Spain
  - 4th: Italy

==== International women's tournaments ====
- 21–27 February: 2024 Turkish Women's Cup in Turkey
  - (gold) : Kosovo
  - (silver) : India
  - (bronze) : Estonia
  - 4th: Hong Kong
- 24–26 February: 2024 Pinatar Cup in Spain
  - (gold) : Finland
  - (silver) : Scotland
  - (bronze) : Slovenia
  - 4th: Philippines
- 1–8 March: 2024 Women's Day Cup in Sierra Leone
  - (gold) : Sierra Leone
  - (silver) : Liberia
  - (bronze) :
  - 4th:
- 6–9 April: 2024 SheBelieves Cup in United States
  - (gold) : United States
  - (silver) : Canada
  - (bronze) : Brazil
  - 4th: Japan
- 27 May – 4 June: 2024 Sud Ladies Cup in France
  - (gold) : France
  - (silver) : Mexico
  - (bronze) : Japan
  - 4th: Morocco
- 28 May – 3 June: 2024 Caribbean Queen's Tournament in Curaçao
  - (gold) : Aruba
  - (silver) : Trinidad and Tobago
  - (bronze) : Curaçao
- 29 June – 3 July: 2024 Women's Under–17 Baltic Cup in Estonia, Latvia, Lithuania
  - (gold) : Lithuania
  - (silver) : Finland
  - (bronze) : Latvia
  - 4th: Estonia
- 11 – 15 September: 2024 Female Football Tournament Gradisca d'Isonzo in Italy
  - (gold) : Italy
  - (silver) : North Macedonia
  - (bronze) : Slovenia
  - 4th: Albania
- 11 – 16 September: 2024 Women's Under–19 Baltic Cup in Estonia, Latvia, Lithuania
  - (gold) : Estonia
  - (silver) : Latvia
  - (bronze) : Faroe Islands
  - 4th: Lithuania
- 23–29 October: 2024 Yongchuan International Tournament in China
  - (gold) : China
  - (silver) : Vietnam
  - (bronze) : Uzbekistan
- 23–29 October: 2024 Pink Ladies Cup in Turkey
  - (gold) : Russia
  - (silver) : Haiti
  - (bronze) : Chinese Taipei
  - 4th: Kenya
- 23–29 October: 2024 Slovenia Nations Women's Cup in Slovenia
  - (gold) : Romania
  - (silver) : Slovenia
  - (bronze) : Croatia
  - 4th: Scotland
- 6–13 November: 2024 UNCAF FIFA FORWARD Tournament in Nicaragua
  - (gold) : Costa Rica
  - (silver) : Panama
  - (bronze) : El Salvador
  - 4th: Honduras
- 2–8 December: 2024 Mano River Union Female Football Tournament in Sierra Leone
  - (gold) : Liberia
  - (silver) : Sierra Leone
  - (bronze) : Guinea
- 16–22 December: 2024 Leeward Islands Women's Challenge Series in Anguilla
  - (gold) : Antigua and Barbuda
  - (silver) : Anguilla
  - (bronze) : U.S. Virgin Islands
  - 4th: Saint Kitts and Nevis

==== International women's futsal tournaments ====
- 11–16 June: 2024 Futsal Week Women's June Cup in Croatia
  - (gold) :Italy
  - (silver) :Poland
  - (bronze) :Finland
  - 4th:Croatia
- 22–28 September: 2024 NSDF Women's Futsal Championships in Thailand
  - (gold) :Vietnam
  - (silver) :China
  - (bronze) :Thailand
  - 4th:Chinese Taipei

== Club continental champions ==
=== Men ===
Region	Tournament	Defending champion	Champion	Title	Last honour
AFC (Asia)	2023–24 AFC Champions League	(Japan) Urawa Red Diamonds	(United Arab Emirates) Al Ain	2nd	2002–03
AFC (Asia)	2023–24 AFC Cup	(Oman) Al-Seeb	(Australia) Central Coast Mariners	1st	—
CAF (Africa)	2023–24 CAF Champions League	(Egypt) Al Ahly	(Egypt) Al Ahly	12th	2022–23
CAF (Africa)	2023–24 CAF Confederation Cup	(Algeria) USM Alger	(Egypt) Zamalek	2nd	2018–19
CAF (Africa)	African Football League	(South Africa) Mamelodi Sundowns	Competition moved to 2024–25 season		
CAF (Africa)	2024 CAF Super Cup	(Algeria) USM Alger	(Egypt) Zamalek	5th	2020
CONCACAF (North and Central America, Caribbean)	2024 CONCACAF Champions Cup	(Mexico) León	(Mexico) Pachuca	6th	2016–17
CONCACAF (North and Central America, Caribbean)	2024 Leagues Cup	(United States) Inter Miami	(United States) Columbus Crew	1st	—
CONCACAF (North and Central America, Caribbean)	2024 CONCACAF Central American Cup	(Costa Rica) Alajuelense	(Costa Rica) Alajuelense	2nd	2023
CONCACAF (North and Central America, Caribbean)	2024 CONCACAF Caribbean Cup	(Suriname) Robinhood	(Jamaica) Cavalier	1st	—
CONCACAF (North and Central America, Caribbean)	2024 CFU Club Shield	(Suriname) Robinhood	(Jamaica) Arnett Gardens	1st	—
CONMEBOL (South America)	2024 Copa Libertadores	(Brazil) Fluminense	(Brazil) Botafogo	1st	—
CONMEBOL (South America)	2024 Copa Sudamericana	(Ecuador) LDU Quito	(Argentina) Racing	1st	—
CONMEBOL (South America)	2024 Recopa Sudamericana	(Ecuador) Independiente del Valle	(Brazil) Fluminense	1st	—
CONMEBOL (South America)	2024 U-20 Copa Libertadores	(Argentina) Boca Juniors	(Brazil) Flamengo	1st	—
OFC (Oceania)	2024 OFC Champions League	(New Zealand) Auckland City	(New Zealand) Auckland City	12th	2023
UEFA (Europe)	2023–24 UEFA Champions League	(England) Manchester City	(Spain) Real Madrid	15th	2021–22
UEFA (Europe)	2023–24 UEFA Europa League	(Spain) Sevilla	(Italy) Atalanta	1st	—
UEFA (Europe)	2023–24 UEFA Europa Conference League	(England) West Ham United	(Greece) Olympiacos	1st	—
UEFA (Europe)	2024 UEFA Super Cup	(England) Manchester City	(Spain) Real Madrid	6th	2022
UEFA (Europe)	2023–24 UEFA Youth League	(Netherlands) AZ	(Greece) Olympiacos	1st	—
UAFA (Arab States)	Arab Club Champions Cup	(Saudi Arabia) Al Nassr	Competition moved to 2027		
FIFA (Global)	2024 FIFA Intercontinental Cup	First edition	(Spain) Real Madrid	1st	—
FIFA (Global)	2024 Challenger Cup	First edition	(Mexico) Pachuca	1st	—
FIFA (Global)	2024 Derby of the Americas	First edition	(Mexico) Pachuca	1st	—
FIFA (Global)	2024 African–Asian–Pacific Cup	First edition	(Egypt) Al Ahly	1st	—
FIFA (Global)	2024 Under-20 Intercontinental Cup	(Argentina) Boca Juniors	(Brazil) Flamengo	1st	—

=== Women ===
Region	Tournament	Defending champion	Champion	Title	Last honour
AFC (Asia)	AFC Women's Champions League	First edition	Competition moved to 2024–25 season		
CAF (Africa)	2024 CAF Women's Champions League	(South Africa) Mamelodi Sundowns	(Democratic Republic of the Congo) TP Mazembe	1st	—
CONCACAF (North and Central America, Caribbean)	CONCACAF W Champions Cup	First edition	Competition moved to 2024–25 season		
CONMEBOL (South America)	2024 Copa Libertadores Femenina	(Brazil) Corinthians	(Brazil) Corinthians	5th	2023
OFC (Oceania)	2024 OFC Women's Champions League	(New Caledonia) AS Academy	(New Zealand) Auckland United	1st	—
UEFA (Europe)	2023–24 UEFA Women's Champions League	(Spain) Barcelona	(Spain) Barcelona	3rd	2022–23

== National leagues ==
=== AFC ===
Nation	League	Champion	Second place	Title	Last honour
Afghanistan	2024 Afghanistan Champions League	Attack Energy	Sorkh Poshan	2nd	2022
Australia	2023–24 A-League Men	Central Coast Mariners (Note: In A-League Men (as well as its female counterpart of A-League Women), the term "champions" refers to the winner of the playoff tournament (known in Australian English as the "finals series") that follows the league season. The team that tops the league table is designated "premiers".)	Melbourne Victory	3rd	2022–23
Bahrain	2023–24 Bahraini Premier League	Al-Khaldiya	Al-Riffa	2nd	2022–23
Bangladesh	2023–24 Bangladesh Premier League	Bashundhara Kings	Mohammedan SC	5th	2022–23
Bhutan	2024 Bhutan Premier League	Paro	Transport United	5th	2023
Cambodia	2023–24 Cambodian Premier League	Preah Khan Reach Svay Rieng	Phnom Penh Crown	3rd	2019
China	2024 Chinese Super League	Shanghai Port	Shanghai Shenhua	3rd	2023
Guam	2024 Guam Soccer League	Wings	Rovers	2nd	2022–23
Hong Kong	2023–24 Hong Kong Premier League	Lee Man	Tai Po	1st	—N/a
India	2023–24 Indian Super League	Mohun Bagan SG	Mumbai City	1st	—N/a
Indonesia	2023–24 Liga 1	Persib	Madura United	2nd	2014
Iran	2023–24 Persian Gulf Pro League	Persepolis	Esteghlal	16th	2022–23
Iraq	2023–24 Iraq Stars League	Al-Shorta	Al-Quwa Al-Jawiya	7th	2022–23
Japan	2024 J1 League	Vissel Kobe	Sanfrecce Hiroshima	2nd	2023
Jordan	2023–24 Jordanian Pro League	Al-Hussein-Irbid	Al-Faisaly	1st	—N/a
Kuwait	2023–24 Kuwaiti Premier League	Al-Kuwait	Al-Arabi	19th	2022–23
Kyrgyzstan	2024 Kyrgyz Premier League	Abdysh-Ata Kant	Dordoi Bishkek	3rd	2023
Lebanon	2023–24 Lebanese Premier League	Ansar	Nejmeh	15th	2020–21
Macau	2024 Liga de Elite	Benfica de Macau	Chao Pak Kei	6th	2018
Maldives	2024 Dhivehi Premier League				
Mongolia	2023–24 Mongolian Premier League	SP Falcons	Khangarid	1st	—N/a
Myanmar	2024 Myanmar National League				
North Korea	2023–24 DPR Korea Premier Football League				
Oman	2023–24 Oman Professional League	Al-Seeb	Al Nahda	3rd	2021–22
Palestine	2023–24 Gaza Strip Premier League	Season abandoned due to the Gaza war.			
Palestine	2023–24 West Bank Premier League	Season abandoned due to the Gaza war.			
Philippines	2024 Philippines Football League	Kaya-Iloilo	Dynamic Herb Cebu	2nd	2022–23
Qatar	2023–24 Qatar Stars League	Al-Sadd	Al-Rayyan	17th	2021–22
Saudi Arabia	2023–24 Saudi Professional League	Al Hilal	Al Nassr	19th	2021–22
South Korea	2024 K League 1	Ulsan HD	Gangwon FC	5th	2023
Syria	2023–24 Syrian Premier League	Al-Fotuwa	Jableh	4th	2022–23
Taiwan	2024 Taiwan Football Premier League	Tainan City TSG	Taichung Futuro	5th	2023
Tajikistan	2024 Tajikistan Higher League	Istiklol	Khujand	13th	2023
Thailand	2023–24 Thai League 1	Buriram United	Bangkok United	10th	2022–23
Timor-Leste	2024 Copa FFTL	São José FC	B2B FC	1st	
Turkmenistan	2024 Ýokary Liga	Arkadag	Altyn Asyr	2nd	2023
United Arab Emirates	2023–24 UAE Pro League	Al Wasl	Shabab Al Ahli	8th	2006–07
Uzbekistan	2024 Uzbekistan Super League	Nasaf	AGMK	1st	—N/a
Vietnam	2023–24 V.League 1	Thep Xanh Nam Dinh	Quy Nhon Binh Dinh	2nd	1985
Yemen	2023–24 Yemeni League	Al-Ahli San'a	Al-Tadamun Hadhramaut	11th	2007

=== CAF ===
Nation	League	Champion	Second place	Title	Last honour
Algeria	2023–24 Algerian Ligue Professionnelle 1	MC Alger	CR Belouizdad	8th	2009–10
Angola	2023–24 Girabola	Petro de Luanda	Sagrada Esperança	18th	2022-23
Benin	2023–24 Benin Premier League	Coton	Dadjè	3rd	2022–23
Botswana	2023–24 Botswana Premier League	Jwaneng Galaxy	Township Rollers	3rd	2022–23
Burkina Faso	2023–24 Burkinabé Premier League	AS Douanes	Majestic FC	2nd	2022-23
Burundi	2023–24 Burundi Ligue A	Vital'O FC	Flambeau du Centre	21st	2015–16
Cameroon	2023–24 Elite One	Victoria United	Coton Sport	1st	—N/a
Cape Verde	2024 Cape Verdean Football Championship	Boavista	FC Derby	5th	2010
Central African Republic	2023–24 Central African Republic League	Tempête Mocaf	Red Star	12th	2019
Chad	2024 Chad Premier League				
Comoros	2023–24 Comoros Premier League	US Zilimadjou	Etoile d'Or	5th	2020–21
(Republic of the Congo) Congo	2023–24 Congo Ligue 1	AC Léopards	AS Otohô	5th	2017
(Democratic Republic of the Congo) DR Congo	2023–24 Linafoot	TP Mazembe	AS Maniema Union	20th	2021-22
Djibouti	2023–24 Djibouti Premier League	Arta Solar 7	AS Ali Sabieh	3rd	2021-22
Egypt	2023–24 Egyptian Premier League	Al Ahly	Pyramids	44th	2022-23
Equatorial Guinea	2023–24 Equatoguinean Primera División	Deportivo Mongomo	15 de Agosto	5th	2021–22
Eritrea	Eritrean Premier League	Not known			
Eswatini	2023–24 Premier League of Eswatini	Mbabane Swallows	Green Mamba	8th	2017-18
Ethiopia	2023–24 Ethiopian Premier League	CBE	Mechal	1st	—N/a
Gabon	2024 Gabon Championnat National D1				
(The Gambia) Gambia	2023–24 GFA League First Division	Real de Banjul	Falcons FC	14th	2022–23
Ghana	2023–24 Ghana Premier League	Samartex	Accra Lions	1st	—N/a
Guinea	2023–24 Guinée Championnat National	Milo FC	Hafia FC	1st	—N/a
Guinea-Bissau	2023–24 Campeonato Nacional da Guiné-Bissau	Sport Bissau e Benfica	FC Canchungo	14th	2021-22
Ivory Coast	2023–24 Côte d'Ivoire Ligue 1	FC San Pedro	Racing d'Abidjan	1st	—N/a
Kenya	2023–24 Kenyan Premier League	Gor Mahia	Tusker	21st	2022–23
Lesotho	2023–24 Lesotho Premier League	Lioli FC	Matlama FC	6th	2015–16
Liberia	2023–24 Liberian First Division	Watanga	Bea Mountain	2nd	2021–22
Libya	2023–24 Libyan Premier League	Al-Nasr	Al-Ahly	3rd	2017-18
Madagascar	2023–24 Malagasy Pro League	Disciples	Elgeco Plus	1st	—N/a
Malawi	2024 Super League of Malawi	Silver Strikers	Mighty Wanderers	9th	2013–14
Mali	2023–24 Malian Première Division	Djoliba AC	Stade Malien	24th	2021–22
Mauritania	2023–24 Super D1	FC Nouadhibou	AS Douanes	12th	2022–23
Mauritius	2023–24 Mauritian Premier League	Cercle de Joachim	Pamplemousses	3rd	2014-15
Morocco	2023–24 Botola	Raja CA	AS FAR	13th	2019–20
Mozambique	2024 Moçambola	Black Bulls	UD Songo	2nd	2021
Namibia	2023–24 Namibia Premiership	African Stars	Ongos Valley	2nd	2022-23
Niger	2023–24 Super Ligue	AS GNN	AS FAN	6th	2022-23
Nigeria	2023–24 Nigeria Professional Football league	Enugu Rangers	Remo Stars	8th	2016
Réunion	2024 Réunion Premier League	Excelsior	Saint-Pauloise	3rd	2023
Rwanda	2023–24 Rwanda Premier League	APR	Rayon Sports	22nd	2022–23
São Tomé and Príncipe	2024 São Tomé and Príncipe Championship	Agrosport	FC Porto Real	2nd	2019
Senegal	2023–24 Senegal Ligue 1	Teungueth FC	Dakar Sacré-Cœur	2nd	2020–21
Seychelles	2023-24 Seychelles Premier League	Saint Louis Suns United	Foresters FC	16th	2017
Sierra Leone	2023–24 Sierra Leone National Premier League	Bo Rangers	Bhantal	3rd	2022-23
Somalia	2023–24 Somali First Division	Dekedaha	Horseed FC	6th	2019
South Africa	2023–24 South African Premier Division	Mamelodi Sundowns	Orlando Pirates	14th	2022–23
South Sudan	2024 South Sudan Football Championship	Al Merreikh	Al-Malakia	1st	—N/a
Sudan	2023–24 Sudan Premier League				
Tanzania	2023–24 Tanzanian Premier League	Young Africans	Azam	27th	2022–23
Togo	2023–24 Togolese Championnat National	ASKO Kara	ASC Kara	9th	2022-23
Tunisia	2023–24 Tunisian Ligue Professionnelle 1	Espérance de Tunis	US Monastir	33rd	2021–22
Uganda	2023–24 Uganda Premier League	SC Villa	Vipers	17th	2004
Zambia	2023–24 Zambia Super League	Red Arrows	ZESCO United	3rd	2021–22
Zanzibar	2023–24 Zanzibar Premier League	JKU	Zimamoto	3rd	2017–18
Zimbabwe	2024 Zimbabwe Premier Soccer League	Platinum	Chicken Inn	5th	2021–22

=== CONCACAF ===
Nation	League	Champion	Second place	Title	Last honour
Anguilla	2024 AFA Senior Male League	Doc's United	Roaring Lions	2nd	2023
Antigua and Barbuda	2023–24 Antigua and Barbuda Premier Division	All Saints United	Grenades	1st	—N/a
Aruba	2023–24 Aruban Division di Honor	Britannia	Dakota	5th	2013–14
(The Bahamas) Bahamas	2023-24 BFA Senior League	Western Warriors	UB Mingoes	4th	2022-23
Barbados	2024 Barbados Premier League	Weymouth Wales	UWI Blackbirds	20th	2023
Belize	2024 Closing	Port Layola F.C.	Verdes	1st	—N/a
Belize	2024 Opening	Port Layola F.C.	San Pedro Pirates	2nd	2024 Closing
Bermuda	2023–24 Bermudian Premier Division	PHC Zebras	North Village Rams	13th	2022–23
Bonaire	2023–24 Bonaire League	Real Rincon	Vespo	16th	2022
British Virgin Islands	2023–24 BVIFA National Football League	Wolues	Islanders FC	1st	—N/a
Canada	2024 Canadian Premier League	Cavalry FC	Forge FC	1st	—N/a
Cayman Islands	2023–24 Cayman Islands Premier League	Scholars International	345 FC	16th	2022–23
Costa Rica	2024 Liga FPD Clausura	Saprissa	Alajuelense	40th	2023 Apertura
Costa Rica	2024 Liga FPD Apertura	Herediano	Alajuelense	30th	2021 Apertura
Dominica	2024 Dominica Premier League	Dublanc FC	WE United FC	5th	2023
Dominican Republic	2024 Liga Dominicana de Fútbol	Cibao FC	O&M FC	5th	2023
El Salvador	2024 Clausura	Alianza	Municipal Limeño	18th	2022 Clausura
El Salvador	2024 Apertura	Once Deportivo	FAS	1st	—N/a
French Guiana	2023-24 French Guiana Régional 1	Étoile Matoury	ASC Le Geldar	2nd	2022-23
Grenada	2023–24 GFA Premier League	Paradise FC	Queens Park Rangers	5th	2018–19
Guadeloupe	2023-24 Guadeloupe Division of Honour	CS Moulien	Siroco Les Abymes	19th	2022–23
Guatemala	2024 Clausura	Municipal	Mixco	32nd	2019 Apertura
Guatemala	2024 Apertura	Xelajú	Cobán Imperial	7th	2023 Clausura
Guyana	2024 GFF Elite League	Guyana Defence Force	Slingerz	3rd	2023
Haiti	2024 Ligue Haïtienne	Real Hope	Ouanaminthe	2nd	2017 Ouverture
Honduras	2024 Clausura	Olimpia	Marathón	38th	2023 Apertura
Honduras	2024 Apertura	Motagua	Olimpia	19th	2022 Clausura
Jamaica	2023–24 Jamaica Premier League	Cavalier	Mount Pleasant	3rd	2021
Martinique	2023–24 Martinique Championnat National	Franciscain	Samaritaine	20th	2018–19
Nicaragua	2023–24 Liga Primera de Nicaragua Clausura	Diriangén	Real Estelí	32nd	2023 Apertura
Nicaragua	2024–25 Liga Primera de Nicaragua Apertura	Diriangén	Real Estelí	33rd	2024 Clausura
Mexico	2024 Liga MX Clausura	América	Cruz Azul	15th	2023 Liga MX Apertura
Mexico	2024 Liga MX Apertura	América	Monterrey	16th	2024 Liga MX Clausura
Panama	2024 Apertura	Tauro	Plaza Amador	17th	2021 Clausura
Panama	2024 Clausura	CAI	Plaza Amador	7th	2023 Apertura
Saint Kitts and Nevis	2024 SKNFA Premier League	St. Paul's United	St. Peters Strikers	7th	2021–22
Suriname	2024 Suriname Major League	Robinhood	Transvaal	27th	2023
Trinidad and Tobago	2023-24 TT Premier Football League	AC Port of Spain	Police FC	3rd	2017
United States	2024 Major League Soccer season	LA Galaxy	New York Red Bulls	6th	2014

=== CONMEBOL ===
Nation	League	Champion	Second place	Title	Last honour
Argentina	2024 Argentine Primera División	Vélez Sarsfield	Talleres (C)	11th	2012–13 Superfinal
Bolivia	2024 Bolivian Primera División	Bolívar	San Antonio Bulo Bulo	31st	2022 Apertura
Brazil	2024 Campeonato Brasileiro Série A	Botafogo	Palmeiras	3rd	1995
Chile	2024 Chilean Primera División	Colo-Colo	Universidad de Chile	34th	2022
Colombia	2024 Categoría Primera A Apertura	Atlético Bucaramanga	Santa Fe	1st	—N/a
Colombia	2024 Categoría Primera A Finalización	Atlético Nacional	Deportes Tolima	18th	2022 Apertura
Ecuador	2024 Ecuadorian Serie A	LDU Quito	Independiente del Valle	13th	2023
Paraguay	2024 Paraguayan Primera División Apertura	Libertad	Cerro Porteño	25th	2023 Clausura
Paraguay	2024 Paraguayan Primera División Clausura	Olimpia	Guaraní	47th	2022 Clausura
Peru	2024 Liga 1	Universitario	Sporting Cristal	28th	2023
Uruguay	2024 Uruguayan Primera División	Peñarol	Nacional	52nd	2021
Venezuela	2024 Venezuelan Primera División	Deportivo Táchira	Carabobo	11th	2023

=== OFC ===
Nation	League	Champion	Second place	Title	Last honour
Fiji	2024 Fiji Premier League	Rewa	Labasa	2nd	2022
Kiribati	2024 Kiribati National Championship				
New Caledonia	2024 New Caledonia Super Ligue				
New Zealand	2024 New Zealand National League	Auckland City	Birkenhead United	10th	2022
American Samoa	2024 FFAS Senior League	Pago Youth	PanSa	9th	2019
Samoa	2024 Samoa National League	Vaipuna	Lupe ole Soaga	2nd	2023
Solomon Islands	2024 Solomon Islands S-League	Central Coast	Solomon Warriors	2nd	2021
Tonga	2024 Tonga Major League				
Tuvalu	2024 Tuvalu A-Division				

=== UEFA ===
Nation	League	Champion	Second place	Title	Last honour
Albania	2023–24 Kategoria Superiore	Egnatia	Partizani	1st	—N/a
Andorra	2023–24 Primera Divisió	UE Santa Coloma	Inter Club d'Escaldes	1st	—N/a
Armenia	2023–24 Armenian Premier League	Pyunik	Noah	16th	2021–22
Austria	2023–24 Austrian Football Bundesliga	Sturm Graz	Red Bull Salzburg	4th	2010–11
Azerbaijan	2023–24 Azerbaijan Premier League	Qarabağ	Zira	11th	2022–23
Belarus	2024 Belarusian Premier League	Dinamo Minsk	Neman Grodno	9th	2023
Belgium	2023–24 Belgian Pro League	Club Brugge	Union Saint-Gilloise	19th	2021–22
Bosnia and Herzegovina	2023–24 Premier League of Bosnia and Herzegovina	Borac Banja Luka	Zrinjski Mostar	3rd	2020–21
Bulgaria	2023–24 First Professional Football League	Ludogorets Razgrad	Cherno More	13th	2022–23
Croatia	2023–24 Croatian Football League	Dinamo Zagreb	Rijeka	25th	2022–23
Cyprus	2023–24 Cypriot First Division	APOEL	AEK Larnaca	29th	2018–19
Czech Republic	2023–24 Czech First League	Sparta Prague	Slavia Prague	35th	2022–23
Denmark	2023–24 Danish Superliga	Midtjylland	Brøndby	4th	2019–20
England	2023–24 Premier League	Manchester City	Arsenal	10th	2022–23
Estonia	2024 Meistriliiga	Levadia	Nõmme Kalju	11th	2021
Faroe Islands	2024 Faroe Islands Premier League	Víkingur	KÍ	3rd	2017
Finland	2024 Veikkausliiga	KuPS	Ilves	7th	2019
France	2023–24 Ligue 1	Paris Saint-Germain	Monaco	12th	2022–23
(Georgia (country)) Georgia	2024 Erovnuli Liga	Iberia 1999	Torpedo Kutaisi	2nd	2018
Germany	2023–24 Bundesliga	Bayer Leverkusen	VfB Stuttgart	1st	—N/a
Gibraltar	2023–24 Gibraltar Football League	Lincoln Red Imps	St Joseph's	28th	2022–23
Greece	2023–24 Super League Greece	PAOK	AEK Athens	4th	2018–19
Hungary	2023–24 Nemzeti Bajnokság I	Ferencváros	Paks	35th	2022–23
Iceland	2024 Besta deild karla	Breiðablik	Víkingur Reykjavík	3rd	2022
Israel	2023–24 Israeli Premier League	Maccabi Tel Aviv	Maccabi Haifa	25th	2019–20
Italy	2023–24 Serie A	Inter Milan	AC Milan	20th	2020–21
Kazakhstan	2024 Kazakhstan Premier League	Kairat	Astana	4th	2020
Kosovo	2023–24 Football Superleague of Kosovo	Ballkani	Llapi	3rd	2022–23
Latvia	2024 Latvian Higher League	RFS	Riga	3rd	2023
Lithuania	2024 A Lyga	FK Žalgiris	Hegelmann	11th	2022
Luxembourg	2023–24 Luxembourg National Division	Differdange 03	Swift Hesperange	7th	1978–79 (Note: Differdange 03's previous title came as part of Red Boys Differdange, who merged into Differdange 03 in 2003)
Malta	2023–24 Maltese Premier League	Ħamrun Spartans	Floriana	10th	2022–23
Moldova	2023–24 Moldovan Super Liga	Petrocub Hîncești	Sheriff Tiraspol	1st	—N/a
Montenegro	2023–24 Montenegrin First League	Dečić	Mornar	1st	—N/a
Netherlands	2023–24 Eredivisie	PSV Eindhoven	Feyenoord	25th	2017–18
North Macedonia	2023–24 Macedonian First Football League	Struga	Shkëndija	2nd	2022–23
Northern Ireland	2023–24 NIFL Premiership	Larne	Linfield	2nd	2022–23
Norway	2024 Eliteserien	Bodø/Glimt	Brann	4th	2023
Poland	2023–24 Ekstraklasa	Jagiellonia Białystok	Śląsk Wrocław	1st	—N/a
Portugal	2023–24 Primeira Liga	Sporting CP	Benfica	20th	2020–21
Republic of Ireland	2024 League of Ireland Premier Division	Shelbourne	Shamrock Rovers	14th	2006
Romania	2023–24 Liga I	FCSB	CFR Cluj	27th	2014–15
Russia	2023–24 Russian Premier League	Zenit Saint Petersburg	Krasnodar	11th	2022–23
San Marino	2023–24 Campionato Sammarinese di Calcio	Virtus	La Fiorita	1st	—N/a
Scotland	2023–24 Scottish Premiership	Celtic	Rangers	54th	2022–23
Serbia	2023–24 Serbian SuperLiga	Red Star Belgrade	Partizan	35th	2022–23
Slovakia	2023–24 Slovak First Football League	Slovan Bratislava	DAC Dunajská Streda	14th	2022–23
Slovenia	2023–24 Slovenian PrvaLiga	Celje	Maribor	2nd	2019–20
Spain	2023–24 La Liga	Real Madrid	Barcelona	36th	2021–22
Sweden	2024 Allsvenskan	Malmö	Hammarby	24th	2023
Switzerland	2023–24 Swiss Super League	Young Boys	Lugano	17th	2022–23
Turkey	2023–24 Süper Lig	Galatasaray	Fenerbahçe	24th	2022–23
Ukraine	2023–24 Ukrainian Premier League	Shakhtar Donetsk	Dynamo Kyiv	15th	2022–23
Wales	2023–24 Cymru Premier	The New Saints	Connah's Quay Nomads	16th	2022–23

=== Non-FIFA ===
Nation	League	Champion	Second place	Title	Last honour
Greenland	2024 Greenlandic Football Championship	B-67 Nuuk	Nagdlunguaq-48	15th	2023
Gozo	2023–24 Gozo Football League First Division	Nadur Youngsters	Qala Saints	15th	2022–23
Gozo	2023–24 Gozo Football League Second Division	Victoria Hotspurs	Sannat Lions	1st	—N/a

== Domestic cups ==
=== UEFA ===
Nation	League	Champion	Final score	Second place	Title	Last honour
Albania	2023–24 Albanian Cup	Egnatia	1–0	Kukësi	2nd	2022–23
Albania	2024 Albanian Supercup	Egnatia	2–0	Kukësi	1st	—N/a
Andorra	2024 Copa Constitució	UE Santa Coloma	1–0	Pas de la Casa	4th	2017
Armenia	2023–24 Armenian Cup	Ararat-Armenia	1–1 (5–3 p)	Urartu	1st	—N/a
Austria	2023–24 Austrian Cup	SK Sturm Graz	2–1	SK Rapid Wien	7th	2022–23
Azerbaijan	2023–24 Azerbaijan Cup	Qarabağ	2–1	Zira	8th	2021–22
Belarus	2023–24 Belarusian Cup	Neman Grodno	2–0	Isloch Minsk Raion	2nd	1992–93
Belarus	2024 Belarusian Super Cup	Torpedo Zhodino	0–0 (4–3 p)	Dinamo Minsk	1st	—N/a
Belgium	2023–24 Belgian Cup	Union Saint-Gilloise	1–0	Antwerp	3rd	1913–14
Belgium	2024 Belgian Super Cup	Union Saint-Gilloise	2–1	Club Brugge	1st	—N/a
Bosnia and Herzegovina	2023–24 Bosnia and Herzegovina Football Cup	Zrinjski Mostar	2–0	Borac Banja Luka	3rd	2022–23
Bulgaria	2023–24 Bulgarian Cup	Botev Plovdiv	3–2	Ludogorets Razgrad	4th	2016–17
Bulgaria	2024 Bulgarian Supercup	Ludogorets Razgrad	3–2	Botev Plovdiv	8th	2023
Croatia	2023–24 Croatian Football Cup	Dinamo Zagreb	3–1	Rijeka	17th	2020–21
Croatia	2024 Croatian Football Super Cup					
Cyprus	2023–24 Cypriot Cup	Pafos	3–0	Omonia	1st	—N/a
Czech Republic	2023–24 Czech Cup	Sparta Prague	2–1	Viktoria Plzeň	8th	2019–20
Denmark	2023–24 Danish Cup	Silkeborg	2–0	AGF	2nd	2000–01
England	2023–24 FA Cup	Manchester United	2–1	Manchester City	13th	2015–16
England	2024 FA Community Shield	Manchester City	1–1 (7–6 p)	Manchester United	7th	2019
England	2023–24 EFL Cup	Liverpool	1–0 (a.e.t.)	Chelsea	10th	2021–22
Estonia	2023–24 Estonian Cup	FC Levadia	4–2	Paide Linnameeskond	11th	2020–21
Estonia	2024 Estonian Supercup	FC Flora	2–2 (5–3 p)	Narva Trans	12th	2021
Faroe Islands	2024 Faroe Islands Super Cup	HB Tórshavn	3–2	KÍ Klaksvík	4th	2021
France	2023–24 Coupe de France	Paris Saint-Germain	2–1	Lyon	15th	2020–21
France	2024 Trophée des Champions	Paris Saint-Germain	1–0	Monaco	13th	2023
Finland	2024 Finnish Cup	KuPS	2–1	Inter Turku	5th	2022
Finland	2024 Finnish League Cup	Inter Turku	2–2 (4–2 p)	KuPS	2nd	2008
(Georgia (country)) Georgia	2024 Georgian Cup	Spaeri	2–2 (5–4 p)	Dinamo Tbilisi	1st	—N/a
(Georgia (country)) Georgia	2024 Georgian Super Cup	Torpedo Kutaisi	2–1	Dinamo Tbilisi	3rd	2019
Germany	2023–24 DFB-Pokal	Bayer Leverkusen	1–0	1. FC Kaiserslautern	2nd	1992–93
Germany	2024 DFL-Supercup	Bayer Leverkusen	2–2 (4–3 p)	VfB Stuttgart	1st	—N/a
Gibraltar	2023–24 Rock Cup	Lincoln Red Imps	3–0	Europa	12th	2021–22
Greece	2023–24 Greek Football Cup	Panathinaikos	1–0	Aris	20th	2021–22
Hungary	2023–24 Magyar Kupa	Paks	2–0 (a.e.t.)	Ferencváros	1st	—N/a
(Republic of Ireland) Ireland	2024 President of Ireland's Cup	Shamrock Rovers	3–1	St Patrick's Athletic	2nd	2022
Iceland	2024 Icelandic Men's Football Super Cup	Víkingur Reykjavík	1–1 (4–2 p)	Valur	4th	2022
Israel	2023–24 Israel State Cup	Maccabi Petah Tikva	1–0	Hapoel Be'er Sheva	3rd	1951–52
Israel	2023–24 Toto Cup Al	Maccabi Tel Aviv	0–0 (4–2 p)	Maccabi Haifa	7th	2020–21
Israel	2024 Israel Super Cup	Maccabi Tel Aviv	2–0	Maccabi Petah Tikva	8th	2020
Italy	2023–24 Coppa Italia	Juventus	1–0	Atalanta	15th	2020–21
Italy	2024–25 Supercoppa Italiana	AC Milan	3–2	Inter Milan	8th	2016
Kazakhstan	2024 Kazakhstan Cup	Aktobe	2–1	Atyrau	2nd	2008
Kazakhstan	2024 Kazakhstan Super Cup	FC Tobol	1–1 (5–4 p)	FC Ordabasy	2nd	2022
Latvia	2024 Latvian Supercup	Riga FC	1–1 (5–4 p)	FK RFS	1st	—N/a
Liechtenstein	2023–24 Liechtenstein Cup	FC Vaduz	5–0	FC Triesenberg	50th	2022–23
Lithuania	2024 Lithuanian Football Cup	Banga	0–0 (4–1 p)	Hegelmann	1st	—N/a
Lithuania	2024 Lithuanian Supercup	FK Panevėžys	0–0 (5–4 p)	FK TransINVEST	1st	—N/a
Luxembourg	2023–24 Luxembourg Cup	Progrès Niederkorn	1–1 (a.e.t.) (3–1 p)	Swift Hesperange	5th	1977–78
Malta	2023–24 Maltese FA Trophy	Sliema Wanderers	0–0 (4–2 p)	Floriana	22nd	2015–16
Moldova	2023–24 Moldovan Cup	Petrocub Hîncești	3–1	Zimbru Chișinău	2nd	2019–20
Netherlands	2023–24 KNVB Cup	Feyenoord	1–0	NEC Nijmegen	14th	2017–18
Netherlands	2024 Johan Cruyff Shield	Feyenoord	4–4 (4–2 p)	PSV Eindhoven	5th	2018
Northern Ireland	2023–24 Irish Cup	Cliftonville	3–1	Linfield	9th	1978–79
Norway	2024 Norwegian Football Cup	Fredrikstad	0–0 (5–4 p)	Molde	12th	2006
Poland	2023–24 Polish Cup	Wisła Kraków	2–1	Pogoń Szczecin	5th	2002–03
Poland	2024 Polish Super Cup	Jagiellonia Białystok	1–0	Wisła Kraków		
Portugal	2023–24 Taça de Portugal	Porto	2–1 (a.e.t.)	Sporting CP	20th	2022–23
Portugal	2024 Supertaça Cândido de Oliveira	Porto	4–3 (a.e.t.)	Sporting CP	24th	2022
Portugal	2023–24 Taça da Liga	Braga	1–1 (5–4 p)	Estoril	3rd	2019–20
Romania	2023–24 Cupa României	Corvinul Hunedoara	2–2 (3–2 p)	Oțelul Galați	1st	—N/a
Romania	2024 Supercupa României	FCSB	3–0	Corvinul Hunedoara	7th	2013
Russia	2023–24 Russian Cup	Zenit Saint Petersburg	2–1	Baltika Kaliningrad	6th	2019–20
Russia	2024 Russian Super Cup	Zenit Saint Petersburg	4–2	Krasnodar	8th	2023
San Marino	2023–24 Coppa Titano	La Fiorita	0–0 (4–2 p)	Virtus	7th	2020–21
Scotland	2023–24 Scottish Cup	Celtic	1–0	Rangers	42nd	2022–23
Scotland	2023–24 Scottish League Cup	Rangers	1–0	Aberdeen	28th	2010–11
Serbia	2023–24 Serbian Cup	Red Star Belgrade	2–1	Vojvodina	7th	2022–23
Slovakia	2023–24 Slovak Cup	MFK Ružomberok	1–0	Spartak Trnava	2nd	2005–06
Slovenia	2023–24 Slovenian Football Cup	Rogaška	1–1 (6–5 p)	Gorica	1st	—N/a
Spain	2023–24 Copa del Rey	Athletic Bilbao	1–1 (4–2 p)	Mallorca	24th	1983–84
Spain	2023–24 Supercopa de España	Real Madrid	4–1	Barcelona	13th	2021–22
Sweden	2023–24 Svenska Cupen	Malmö FF	1–1 (4–1 p)	Djurgårdens IF	16th	2021–22
Switzerland	2023–24 Swiss Cup	Servette	0–0 (9–8 p)	Lugano	8th	2000–01
Turkey	2023–24 Turkish Cup	Beşiktaş	3–2	Trabzonspor	11th	2020–21
Ukraine	2023–24 Ukrainian Cup	Shakhtar Donetsk	2–1	Vorskla Poltava	14th	2018–19
Wales	2023–24 Welsh Cup	Connah's Quay Nomads	2–1	The New Saints	2nd	2017–18
Wales	2023–24 Welsh League Cup	The New Saints	5–1	Swansea City U21	9th	2017–18

=== AFC ===
Nation	League	Champion	Final score	Second place	Title	Last honour
Australia	2024 Australia Cup	Macarthur FC	1–0	Melbourne Victory	2nd	2022
Bahrain	2024 Bahraini FA Cup	Manama	1–0	Al-Shabab	2nd	2023
Bangladesh	2023–24 Federation Cup	Bashundhara Kings	2–1	Mohammedan SC	3rd	2020–21
Cambodia	2024 Hun Sen Cup	PKR Svay Rieng	1–0	Phnom Penh Crown	5th	2017
China	2024 Chinese FA Cup	Shanghai Port	3–1	Shandong Taishan	1st	—N/a
China	2024 Chinese FA Super Cup	Shanghai Shenhua	1–0	Shanghai Port	4th	2001
Hong Kong	2023–24 Hong Kong Senior Challenge Shield	Kitchee	2–1 (a.e.t.)	Eastern	9th	2022–23
India	2024 Durand Cup	NorthEast United	2–2 (4–3 p)	Mohun Bagan SG	1st	—N/a
India	2024 Indian Super Cup	East Bengal	3–2 (a.e.t.)	Odisha	1st	—N/a
Iran	2023–24 Hazfi Cup	Sepahan	2–0	Mes Rafsanjan	5th	2012–13
Iraq	2023–24 Iraq FA Cup	Al-Shorta	1–0	Al-Quwa Al-Jawiya	1st	—N/a
Japan	2024 Japanese Super Cup	Kawasaki Frontale	1–0	Vissel Kobe	3rd	2021
Jordan	2023–24 Jordan FA Cup	Al-Wehdat	2–1	Al-Hussein	12th	2022
Jordan	2024 Jordan Super Cup	Al-Hussein	3–1	Al-Wehdat	2nd	2003
Kuwait	2023–24 Kuwait Emir Cup	Al-Qadsia	1–0	Al-Salmiya	17th	2014–15
Kuwait	2023–24 Kuwait Super Cup	Al-Kuwait	2–1	Kazma	7th	2022
Oman	2023–24 Sultan Qaboos Cup	Dhofar	2–0	Al-Nahda	11th	2020–21
Qatar	2023–24 Qatari Stars Cup	Umm Salal	4–4 (3–1 p)	Al-Arabi	1st	—N/a
Qatar	2024 Qatar Cup	Al-Wakrah	1–0	Al-Rayyan	2nd	1999
Saudi Arabia	2023–24 King Cup	Al Hilal	1–1 (a.e.t.) (5–4 p)	Al Nassr	11th	2022–23
Saudi Arabia	2023 Saudi Super Cup	Al-Hilal	4–1	Al-Ittihad	4th	2021
Singapore	2024 Singapore Community Shield	Lion City Sailors	2–0	Albirex Niigata Singapore	2nd	2022
Syria	2023–24 Syrian Cup	Al-Fotuwa	0–0 (a.e.t.) (5–4 p)	Al-Wahda	5th	1990–91
Thailand	2023–24 Thai FA Cup	Bangkok United	1–1 (a.e.t.) (4–1 p)	Dragon Pathumwan Kanchanaburi	1st	—N/a
Thailand	2023–24 Thai League Cup	BG Pathum United	1–0	Muangthong United	1st	—N/a
Tajikistan	2024 Tajikistan Cup	Regar-TadAZ Tursunzoda	2–1	Khujand	7th	2012
Tajikistan	2024 Tajik Super Cup	FC Istiklol	2–1	Ravshan Kulob	12th	2022
United Arab Emirates	2023–24 UAE League Cup	Al Wahda	1–0	Al Ain	3rd	2017–18
United Arab Emirates	2023–24 UAE President's Cup	Al Wasl	4–0	Al-Nasr	3rd	2006–07
Uzbekistan	2024 Uzbekistan Super Cup	Nasaf	1–1 (4–3 p)	Pakhtakor	3rd	2023
Vietnam	2023–24 Vietnamese Cup	Dong A Thanh Hoa	0–0 (a.e.t.) (9–8 p)	Hanoi FC	2nd	2023
Vietnam	2024 Vietnamese Super Cup	Thép Xanh Nam Định	3–0	Dong A Thanh Hoa	1st	—N/a

=== CAF ===
Nation	League	Champion	Final score	Second place	Title	Last honour
Algeria	2023–24 Algerian Cup	CR Belouizdad	1–0	MC Alger	9th	2018–19
Algeria	2024 Algerian Super Cup		–			
Angola	2023–24 Taça de Angola	Petro de Luanda	2–0	Bravos do Maquis	15th	2022–23
Botswana	2024 Botswana FA Challenge Cup	Jwaneng Galaxy	2–1	Orapa United	1st	—N/a
Burkina Faso	2024 Coupe du Faso	Étoile Filante	0–0 (5–4 p)	Rahimo FC	23rd	2023
Burundi	2024 Burundian Cup	Rukinzo	2–1	Flambeau du Centre	1st	—N/a
Cameroon	2024 Cameroonian Cup	Colombe Sportive	1–0	Aigle Royal Menoua	1st	—N/a
Cape Verde	2023–24 Taça Nacional de Cabo Verde	Mindelense	2–1	Palmeira	2nd	1982
Chad	2023–24 Chad Cup		–			
Comoros	2023–24 Comoros Cup	Alizé Fort	0–0 (3–2 p)	Etoile du Centre	1st	—N/a
(Republic of the Congo) Congo	2024 Coupe du Congo		–			
(Democratic Republic of the Congo) DR Congo	2024 Coupe du DR Congo	AS Vita Club	1–0	FC Céleste	10th	2001
Egypt	2023–24 Egypt Cup	Pyramids	1–0	ZED	1st	—N/a
Equatorial Guinea	2024 Equatoguinean Cup	15 de Agosto	3–0	Cano Sport Academy	1st	—N/a
Ghana	2023–24 Ghana FA Cup	Nsoatreman	1–1 (5–4 p)	Bofoakwa Tano	1st	—N/a
Guinea-Bissau	2024 Taça Nacional da Guiné Bissau	UD Internacional	1–1 (3–1 p)	Benfica Bissau	7th	1996
Kenya	2024 FKF President's Cup	Police FC	0–0 (8–7 p)	KCB	1st	—N/a
Liberia	2024 Liberian FA Cup	Paynesville FC	1–0	Invincible Eleven	1st	—N/a
Libya	2024 Libyan Cup		–			
Madagascar	2023–24 Coupe de Madagascar	ASSM Elgeco Plus	1–0	CFFA - Andoharanofotsy	5th	2023
Mali	2024 Malian Cup	Stade Malien	4–0	Afrique Football Élite	23rd	2023
Mauritania	2024 Mauritanian President's Cup	ASC Snim	2–1	Tevragh-Zeïna	3rd	2019
Mauritius	2024 Mauritian Cup	Pamplemousses SC	2–0	AS Port-Louis 2000	4th	2018
Morocco	2022–23 Moroccan Throne Cup	Raja CA	2–1	AS FAR	9th	2016–17
Mozambique	2024 Mozambique Super Cup	Black Bulls	2–0	Ferroviário	1st	—
Niger	2024 Niger Cup	AS FAN	1–0	US GN	4th	2010
Nigeria	2024 Nigeria Federation Cup	El-Kanemi Warriors	2–0	Abia Warriors	3rd	1992
Réunion	2024 Coupe de la Réunion	Excelsior	0–0 (5–4 p)	La Tamponnaise	5th	2015
Rwanda	2024 Rwandan Cup	Police FC	2–1	Bugesera FC	2nd	2015
São Tomé and Príncipe	2024 Taça Nacional de São Tomé e Príncipe	GD Os Operários	1–1 (4–3 p)	6 de Setembro	3rd	2003
Senegal	2024 Senegal FA Cup	Mbour Petite-Côte FC	1–0	Académie Les Férus de Foot	3rd	2017
Seychelles	2024 Seychelles FA Cup	Foresters	2–1	La Passe FC	2nd	2020
Somalia	2024 Somalia Cup	Dekedaha	2–1	Mogadishu City	4th	2023
South Africa	2023–24 Nedbank Cup	Orlando Pirates	2–1	Mamelodi Sundowns	10th	2022–23
South Africa	2024 Carling Knockout Cup	Magesi	2–1	Mamelodi Sundowns	1st	—N/a
South Africa	2024 MTN 8	Orlando Pirates	3–1	Stellenbosch	13th	2023
South Sudan	2024 South Sudan National Cup	Jamus FC	1–1 (4–2 p)	Al Merreikh	1st	—N/a
Sudan	2023–24 Sudan Cup		–			
Tanzania	2023–24 Tanzania FA Cup	Young Africans	0–0 (6–5 p)	Azam	4th	2022–23
Tunisia	2023–24 Tunisian Cup	Stande Tunisien	2–0	CA Bizertin	7th	2002–03
Tunisia	2024 Tunisian Super Cup		–			
Uganda	2023–24 Uganda Cup	Kitara	1–0	NEC	1st	—N/a
Zimbabwe	2024 Zimbabwe Challenge Cup	Ngezi Platinum	2–0	Dynamos	5th	2023

=== CONCACAF ===
Nation	League	Champion	Final score	Second place	Title	Last honour
Canada	2024 Canadian Championship	Vancouver Whitecaps FC	0–0 (4–2 p)	Toronto FC	4th	2023
United States	2024 U.S. Open Cup	Los Angeles FC	3–1 (a.e.t.)	Sporting Kansas City	1st	—N/a

=== CONMEBOL ===
Nation	League	Champion	Final score	Second place	Title	Last honour
Argentina	2024 Copa Argentina	Central Córdoba (SdE)	1–0	Vélez Sarsfield	1st	—N/a
Argentina	2024 Copa de la Liga Profesional	Estudiantes (LP)	1–1 (4–3 p)	Vélez Sarsfield	1st	—N/a
Argentina	2024 Trofeo de Campeones de la Liga Profesional	Estudiantes (LP)	3–0	Vélez Sarsfield	1st	—N/a
Brazil	2024 Copa do Brasil	Flamengo	4–1	Atlético Mineiro	5th	2022
Brazil	2024 Supercopa Rei	São Paulo	0–0 (4–2 p)	Palmeiras	1st	—N/a
Brazil	2024 Copa do Nordeste	Fortaleza	2–2 (5–4 p)	CRB	3rd	2022
Brazil	2024 Copa Verde	Paysandu	10–0	Vila Nova	4th	2022
Chile	2024 Copa Chile	Universidad de Chile	1–0	Ñublense	6th	2015
Chile	2024 Supercopa de Chile	Colo-Colo	2–0	Huachipato	4th	2022
Colombia	2024 Copa Colombia	Atlético Nacional	6–1	América de Cali	7th	2023
Colombia	2024 Superliga Colombiana	Millonarios	2–1	Junior	2nd	2018
Ecuador	2024 Copa Ecuador	El Nacional	1–0	Independiente del Valle	2nd	1970
Paraguay	2024 Copa Paraguay	Libertad	1–0	Nacional	3rd	2023
Uruguay	2024 Copa Uruguay	Defensor Sporting	2–2 (3–1 p)	Nacional	3rd	2023
Uruguay	2024 Supercopa Uruguaya	Liverpool	1–0	Defensor Sporting	3rd	2023
Venezuela	2024 Copa Venezuela	Deportivo La Guaira	1–0	Metropolitanos	3rd	2015

=== OFC ===
Nation	League	Champion	Final score	Second place	Title	Last honour
Fiji	2024 FFA Cup	Lautoka	1–0	Navua	3rd	2023
Fiji	2024 Champion vs. Champion	Lautoka	4–3	Ba	1st	—
New Zealand	2024 Chatham Cup	Wellington Olympic	1–1 (5–4 p)	Auckland City	2nd	2009
New Zealand	2024 Charity Cup	Wellington Olympic	3–0	Christchurch United	1st	—

== Women's leagues ==
=== UEFA ===
Nation	League	Champion	Second place	Title	Last honour
Albania	2023–24 Albanian Women's National Championship	Vllaznia	Apolonia	11th	2022–23
Armenia	2023–24 Armenian Women's Premier League				
Austria	2023–24 ÖFB-Frauenliga				
Azerbaijan	2023–24 Azerbaijan Women's Premier League				
Belarus	2024 Belarusian Premier League				
Belgium	2023–24 Belgian Women's Super League	RSC Anderlecht	Standard Liège	11th	2022–23
Bosnia and Herzegovina	2023–24 Bosnia and Herzegovina Women's Premier League				
Bulgaria	2023–24 Bulgarian Women's League				
Croatia	2023–24 Croatian Women's First Football League	ŽNK Osijek	Hajduk Split	25th	2022–23
Cyprus	2023–24 Cypriot First Division	Apollon Ladies	Lefkothea	14th	2022–2023
Czech Republic	2023–24 Czech Women's First League	Slavia Prague	Sparta Prague	10th	2022–23
Denmark	2023–24 Danish Women's League				
England	2023–24 Women's Super League	Chelsea	Manchester City	7th	2022–23
Estonia	2024 Naiste Meistriliiga				
Faroe Islands	2024 1. deild kvinnur				
Finland	2024 Kansallinen Liiga				
France	2023–24 Division 1 Féminine	Lyon	Paris Saint-Germain	17th	2022–23
(Georgia (country)) Georgia	2024 Georgia women's football championship				
Germany	2023–24 Frauen-Bundesliga	Bayern Munich	VfL Wolfsburg	6th	2022–23
Gibraltar	2023–24 Gibraltar Women's Football League	Lions Gibraltar	Europa	6th	2022–23
Greece	2023–24 Greek A Division	PAOK		19th	2022–23
Hungary	2023–24 Női NB I				
Iceland	2024 Úrvalsdeild kvenna				
Israel	2023–24 Ligat Nashim				
Italy	2023–24 Serie A	AS Roma	Juventus	2nd	2022–23
Kazakhstan	2024 Kazakhstani women's football championship				
Kosovo	2023–24 Women's Football Superleague of Kosovo				
Latvia	2023 Latvian Women's League				
Lithuania	2024 Lithuanian Women's A League				
Luxembourg	2023–24 Dames Ligue 1	Racing FC	Swift Hesperange	4th	2022–3
Malta	2023–24 Maltese Women's League	Birkirkara	Swieqi United	12th	2022–23
Moldova	2023–24 Moldovan Women Top League	Agarista Anenii Noi		6th	2022–23
Montenegro	2023–24 Montenegrin Women's League				
Netherlands	2023–24 Eredivisie	Twente	Ajax	9th	2021–22
North Macedonia	2023–24 Macedonian Women's Football Championship				
Northern Ireland	2024 Women's Premiership				
Norway	2024 Toppserien				
Poland	2023–24 Ekstraliga Kobiet				
Portugal	2023–24 Campeonato Nacional Feminino	Benfica	Sporting CP	4th	2022–23
Republic of Ireland	2024 Women's National League	Athlone Town	Shelbourne	1st	–
Romania	2023–24 Liga I				
Russia	2024 Russian Women's Football Super League				
Scotland	2023–24 Scottish Women's Premier League	Celtic	Rangers	1st	–
Serbia	2023–24 Serbian Women's Super League				
Slovakia	2023–24 Slovak Women's First League				
Slovenia	2023–24 Slovenian Women's League				
Spain	2023–24 Liga F	Barcelona	Real Madrid	9th	2022–23
Sweden	2024 Damallsvenskan				
Switzerland	2023–24 Swiss Women's Super League				
Turkey	2023–24 Turkish Women's Football Super League	Galatasaray	Ankara BB FOMGET	1st	—N/a
Ukraine	2023–24 Ukrainian Women's League				
Wales	2023–24 Adran Premier	Cardiff City	Swansea City	3rd	2022–23

=== AFC ===
Nation	League	Champion	Second place	Title	Last honour
Australia	2023–24 A-League Women	Sydney FC (Note: In A-League Women (as well as its male counterpart of A-League Men), the term "champions" refers to the winner of the playoff tournament (known in Australian English as the "finals series") that follows the league season. The team that tops the league table is designated "premiers".)	Melbourne City FC	5th (Note: Reflects only wins in the Grand Final, the last match of the A-League Women finals series.)	2022–23
India	2023–24 Indian Women's League	Odisha FC	Gokulam Kerala FC	1st	—N/a
Iraq	2023–24 Iraqi Women's Football League	Al-Quwa Al-Jawiya	Naft Al-Shamal	1st	—N/a
Japan	2023–24 WE League	Urawa Reds	INAC Kobe Leonessa	2nd	2022–23
Saudi Arabia	2023–24 Saudi Women's Premier League	Al-Nassr	Al-Ahli	2nd	2022–23
Singapore	2024 Women's Premier League	Lion City Sailors	Albirex Niigata (S)	3rd	2023

=== CAF ===
Nation	League	Champion	Second place	Title	Last honour
Algeria	2023–24 Elite National Championship	CF Akbou	JF Khroub	1st	-
Angola	2023–24 Campeonato Nacional Sénior Feminino				
Benin	2023–24 Benin Women's Championship	Ainonvi	Elite AS	1st	-
Botswana	2024 Botswana Women's Championship	Gaborone United Ladies	Tawana Top Girls	1st	-
Burkina Faso	2023–24 Burkinabé Women's Championship	AO Etincelle	Colombes de l'USFA	1st	-
Burundi	2024 Burundi Women's Championship	PVP Buyenzi		2nd	2020–21
Cape Verde	2023–24 Cape Verdean Women's Championship				
Comoros	2023–24 Comorian Women's Championship				
(Republic of the Congo) Congo	2023–24 Congolian Women's Championship	CSM Diables Noirs			
(Democratic Republic of the Congo) DR Congo	2024 DR Congo women's football championship	TP Mazembe	FC Amani	3rd	2023
Djibouti	2023–24 Djiboutian Women's Championship	FAD Club			
Egypt	2023–24 Egyptian Women's Premier League	FC Masar	Wadi Degla SC	1st	-
Equatorial Guinea	2024 Equatoguinean Primera División femenina	Atlético Malabo		1st	-
Eswatini	2024 Eswatini Women's League	Young Buffaloes	Manzini Wanderers	6th	2022–23
Ethiopia	2023–24 Ethiopian Women's Premier League	CBE			
Gabon	2024 Gabonese Women's Championship				
(The Gambia) Gambia	2023–24 GFF Women's League Division One	Red Scorpion Women Football Club		10th	2023
Ghana	2023–24 Ghana Women's Premier League	Hasaacas Ladies			
Guinea	2023–24 Guinea Women's League 1				
Guinea-Bissau	2023–24 Guinea-Bissau Women's Championship				
Ivory Coast	2023–24 Côte d'Ivoire Women's Championship	FC Inter d'Abidjan		1st	-
Kenya	2023–24 Kenyan Women's Premier League	Kenya Police Bullets			
Lesotho	2023–24 Lesotho Women's League				
Liberia	2023–24 Liberian Women's First Division	Determine Girls		4th	2022–23
Madagascar	2023–24 Malagasy Women's Football League				
Malawi	2023–24 Malawi Women's League	Ascent Academy		1st	-
Mali	2023–24 Malian Women's Championship	AS Mandé		5th	2023
Mauritius	2023–24 Mauritiusian Women's League				
Morocco	2023–24 Moroccan Women's Championship	AS FAR	SC Casablanca	11th	2022–23
Mozambique	2023–24 Mozambican Primera División femenina	UD Lichinga			
Namibia	2023–24 Namibia Women's Super League	Ongos SC	Okahandja Beauties	5th	2022–23
Niger	2023–24 Niger Women's Championship	AS GNN		6th	2023
Nigeria	2023–24 NWFL Premiership	Edo Queens	Rivers Angels	1st	-
Rwanda	2023–24 Rwanda Women's Football League	Rayon Sports			
Senegal	2023–24 Senegalese Women's Championship	Aigles de la Médina		3rd	2007
Sierra Leone	2023–24 Sierra Leone Women's Premier League	Mogbwemo Queens Football Club			
South Africa	2024 SAFA Women's League	Mamelodi Sundowns Ladies	UWC Ladies	7th	2023
South Sudan	2023–24 South Sudan Women's National League	Yei Joint Stars			2023
Tanzania	2023–24 Tanzanian Women's Premier League	Simba Queens	JKT Queens	4th	2021–22
Togo	2023–24 Togolese Women's Championship	ASKO Kara			
Tunisia	2023–24 Tunisian Women's Championship	ASF Sousse		2nd	2022–23
Uganda	2023–24 FUFA Women Super League	Kawempe Muslim		5th	2018
Zambia	2023–24 FAZ Women's Super Division	Green Buffaloes	Red Arrows	6th	2022–23
Zimbabwe	2023–24 Zimbabwean Women's League	Herentals Queens	Black Rhinos Queens	2nd	2023

=== CONCACAF ===
Nation	League	Champion	Second place	Title	Last honour
Mexico	2024 Liga MX Femenil Clausura	Monterrey	América	3rd	2021 Apertura
Mexico	2024 Liga MX Femenil Apertura	Monterrey	UANL	4th	2024 Clausura
United States	2024 NWSL season	Orlando Pride	Washington Spirit	1st	—N/a

=== CONMEBOL ===
Nation	League	Champion	Second place	Title	Last honour
Argentina	2024 Argentine Women's Primera División A Apertura	Boca Juniors	Racing	29th	2023 Copa de la Liga
Argentina	2024 Argentine Women's Primera División A Clausura	San Lorenzo	Racing	4th	2021 Apertura
Bolivia	2024 Liga Femenina	Always Ready	Astor FC	3rd	2023
Brazil	2024 Campeonato Brasileiro de Futebol Feminino Série A1	Corinthians	São Paulo	6th	2023
Chile	2024 Campeonato Femenino	Colo-Colo	Universidad de Chile	16th	2023
Colombia	2024 Colombian Women's Football League	Deportivo Cali	Santa Fe	2nd	2021
Ecuador	2024 Superliga Femenina	Dragonas IDV	Barcelona	1st	—N/a
Paraguay	2024 Paraguayan Women's Football Championship	Libertad	Olimpia	2nd	2019
Peru	2024 Liga Femenina	Alianza Lima	Universitario	3rd	2022
Uruguay	2024 Campeonato Uruguayo Femenino	Nacional	Peñarol	7th	2022
Venezuela	2024 Venezuelan Women's Super League	ADIFFEM	Marítimo	1st	—N/a

=== OFC ===
Nation	League	Champion	Second place	Title	Last honour
New Zealand	2024 Women's National League	Auckland United	CF Waterside Karori	2nd	2023

== Women's domestic cups ==
=== UEFA ===
Nation	League	Champion	Final score	Second place	Title	Last honour
Austria	2023–24 ÖFB Frauen Cup	SKN St. Pölten	3–0	Austria Vienna	10th	2022–23
England	2023–24 Women's FA Cup	Manchester United	4–0	Tottenham Hotspur	1st	—N/a
England	2023–24 FA Women's League Cup	Arsenal	1–0 (a.e.t.)	Chelsea	7th	2022–23
Belgium	2023–24 Belgian Women's Cup	Club Brugge	1–1 (a.e.t.) (4–2 p)	OH Leuven	1st	—N/a
Croatia	2023–24 Croatian Women's Football Cup					
Czech Republic	2023–24 Czech Women's Cup	Slavia Prague	2–0	Slovácko	5th	2022–23
Estonia	2023–24 Estonian Women's Cup	FC Flora	2–0	JK Tabasalu	10th	2022–23
France	2023–24 Coupe de France féminine	Paris Saint-Germain	1–0	Fleury 91	4th	2017–18
France	2024 Trophée des Championnes					
Germany	2023–24 DFB-Pokal Frauen	VfL Wolfsburg	2–0	Bayern Munich	11th	2022–23
Germany	2024 DFB-Supercup Frauen	Bayer Leverkusen	2–2 (a.e.t.) (4–3 p)	VfB Stuttgart	1st	—N/a
Gibraltar	2024 Women's Rock Cup					
Greece	2024 Greek Women's Cup					
Hungary	2023–24 Hungarian Women's Cup	Gyori ETO FC	1–1 (3–2 p)	MTK Hungária	3rd	2022–23
Iceland	2024 Icelandic Women's Football League Cup	Valur	2–1	Breidablik	6th	2017
Iceland	2024 Icelandic Women's Football Super Cup	Vikingur	1–1 (5-4 p)	Valur	1st	
Israel	2023–24 Israeli Women's Cup	Kiryat Gat	1–0	Ramat HaSharon	4th	2021–22
Italy	2023–24 Coppa Italia	AS Roma	3–3 (a.e.t.) (4–3 p)	ACF Fiorentina	3rd	2020–21
Italy	2024 Supercoppa Italiana					
Luxembourg	2023–24 Luxembourg Women's Cup	Racing FC	3–2	Mamer 32	2nd	2018–19
Malta	2023–24 Women’s Knock-Out Competition	Birkirkara	2–0	Hibernians	—N/a	—N/a
Moldova	2023–24 Moldovan Women's Cup	Agarista Anenii Noi	5–0	Real Succes Pudra	6th	2022–23
North Macedonia	2023–24 Macedonian Women's Football Cup	Ljuboten	1–0	Kamenica Sasa	—N/a	—N/a
Netherlands	2023–24 Eredivisie Cup	FC Twente	3–2	PSV	4th	2022–23
Netherlands	2023–24 KNVB Women's Cup	AFC Ajax	3–1	Fortuna Sittard	6th	2021–22
Netherlands	2024 Dutch Women's Super Cup					
Poland	2023–24 Polish Women's Cup	GKS Katowice	3–0	Śląsk Wrocław	1st	—N/a
Portugal	2023–24 Taça de Portugal de Futebol Feminina	Benfica	1–0	Sporting CP	2nd	2018–19
Portugal	2023–24 Taça da Liga Feminina	Benfica	1–0	Sporting CP	4th	2022–23
Russia	2024 Russian Women's Super Cup	CSKA Moscow	1–0	Zenit Saint Petersburg	1st	—N/a
Scotland	2023–24 Scottish Women's Cup	Rangers	2–0	Heart of Midlothian	1st	—N/a
Scotland	2023–24 Scottish Women's Premier League Cup	Rangers	4–1	Partick Thistle	2nd	2022–23
Spain	2023–24 Copa de la Reina de Fútbol	FC Barcelona	8–0	Real Sociedad	10th	2021–22
Spain	2023–24 Supercopa de España Femenina	FC Barcelona	7–0	Levante	4th	2022–23
Slovenia	2023–24 Slovenian Women's Cup	ŽNK Mura	5–1	ŽNK Ljubljana	11th	2022–23
Sweden	2023–24 Svenska Cupen Damer	Piteå IF	1–0	BK Häcken	1st	—N/a
Switzerland	2023–24 Swiss Women's Cup	Servette FC Chênois Féminin	3–2	BSC YB Frauen	2nd	2022–23

=== AFC ===
Nation	League	Champion	Final score	Second place	Title	Last honour
Japan	2023–24 Empress's Cup	INAC Kobe Leonessa	1–1 (a.e.t.) (6–5 p)	Urawa Red Diamonds	7th	2016
Philippines	2024 PFF Women's Cup	Stallion Laguna	1–0	Kaya–Iloilo	1st	–
Saudi Arabia	2023–24 SAFF Women's Cup	Al-Ahli	3–2	Al-Shabab	1st	–

=== CAF ===
Nation	League	Champion	Final score	Second place	Title	Last honour
Algeria	2023–24 Algerian Women's Cup		–			
Algeria	2023–24 Algerian Women's League Cup		–			
Burkina Faso	2023–24 Burkinabé Women's Cup		–			
Cameroon	2023–24 Cameroonian Women's Cup		–			
Comoros	2023–24 Comorian Women's Cup		–			
Equatorial Guinea	2023–24 Copa de la Primera Dama de la Nación		–			
Ghana	2023–24 Ghana Women's FA Cup		–			
Liberia	2023–24 Liberian FA Women's Cup		–			
Mali	2023–24 Malian Women's Cup		–			
Morocco	2022–23 Moroccan Women Throne Cup	AS FAR	4–2	Club municipal de Laâyoune	11th	2021–22
Nigeria	2023–24 Nigeria Women's Cup		–			
Senegal	2024 Senegalese Women's Cup		–			
Tunisia	2023–24 Tunisian Women's Cup		–			

=== CONCACAF ===
Nation	League	Champion	Final score	Second place	Title	Last honour
Canada	2024 Inter-Provincial Championship	Whitecaps FC Girls Elite	2–2 (3–2 p.)	CS Mont-Royal Outremont	2nd	2023
United States	2024 NWSL Challenge Cup	San Diego Wave	1–0	NJ/NY Gotham	1st	—N/a

=== CONMEBOL ===
Nation	League	Champion	Final score	Second place	Title	Last honour
Brazil	2024 Supercopa do Brasil de Futebol Feminino	Corinthians	1–0	Cruzeiro	3rd	2023

=== OFC ===
Nation	Tournament	Champion	Final score	Second place	Title	Last honour
New Zealand	2024 Kate Sheppard Cup	Auckland United	1–0	Western Springs	2nd	2022

== Tier II to Tier V domestic leagues ==
=== AFC ===
Nation	League	Champion	Second place	Title	Last honour
Australia	2024 National Premier Leagues Capital Football	Canberra Croatia	Tigers FC	4th	2023
Australia	2024 National Premier Leagues NSW	Marconi Stallions	Rockdale Ilinden	4th	2012
Australia	2024 National Premier Leagues Northern NSW	Broadmeadow Magic	Edgeworth FC	8th	2013
Australia	2024 National Premier Leagues Queensland	Lions FC	Moreton City Excelsior	4th	2021
Australia	2024 National Premier Leagues South Australia	Campbelltown City	North Eastern MetroStars	7th	2020
Australia	2024 National Premier Leagues Tasmania	Glenorchy Knights	South Hobart	2nd	2021
Australia	2024 National Premier Leagues Victoria	Oakleigh Cannons	South Melbourne	2nd	2022
Australia	2024 National Premier Leagues Western Australia	Olympic Kingsway	Stirling Macedonia	1st	—N/a
Australia	2024 Victoria Premier League 1	Melbourne Victory Youth	Preston Lions	1st	—N/a
Australia	2024 Victoria Premier League 2	Melbourne Srbija	North Sunshine Eagles	1st	—N/a
India	2023–24 I-League	Mohammedan	Sreenidi Deccan	1st	—N/a
India	2023–24 I-League 2				
India	2023–24 I-League 3	Sporting Goa	Dempo	1st	—N/a
India	2023–24 Indian State Leagues	2023–24 Assam State Premier League (Karbi Anglong Morning Star)	United Chirang Duar	2nd	2015
India	2023–24 Indian State Leagues	2023–24 Bangalore Super Division (Bengaluru FC B)	SC Bengaluru	3rd	2019–20
India	2023–24 Indian State Leagues	2024 Calcutta Football League			
India	2023–24 Indian State Leagues	2024 Shillong Premier League			
India	2023–24 Indian State Leagues	2024 Sikkim Premier Division League			
India	2023–24 Indian State Leagues	2023–24 Rajasthan League A Division			
Indonesia	2023–24 Liga 2	PSBS	Semen Padang	1st	—
Indonesia	2023–24 Liga 3	Adhyaksa Farmel	Persibo	1st	—
Kuwait	2023–24 Kuwaiti Division One	Al-Yarmouk	Al-Tadamon	4th	2018–19
Saudi Arabia	2023–24 Saudi First Division League	Al-Qadsiah	Al-Orobah	4th	2014–15
Saudi Arabia	2023–24 Saudi Second Division	Neom	Al-Jubail	1st	—N/a
Saudi Arabia	2023–24 Saudi Third Division	Al-Ula	Al-Anwar	1st	—N/a
Saudi Arabia	2023–24 Saudi Fourth Division	Al-Nakhal	Al-Hedaya	1st	—N/a
Singapore	2024 Singapore Football League 1	Singapore Khalsa Association	Singapore Cricket Club	3rd	2023
Singapore	2024 Singapore Football League 2	Tengah FC	Jungfrau Punggol	1st	—N/a
Singapore	2024 Island Wide League	Westwood El'Junior	GDT Circuit	1st	—N/a

=== CAF ===
Nation	League	Champion	Second place	Title	Last honour
Algeria	2023–24 Ligue 2				
Algeria	2023–24 Ligue Inter-Régions (6 groups)				
Algeria	2023–24 Ligue Régional I (9 groups)				
Algeria	2023–24 Ligue Régional II (9 groups)				
Algeria	2023–24 Ligue de Wilaya HD (18 groups)				
Algeria	2023–24 Ligue de Wilaya PHD (18 groups)				
Angola	2023–24 Segundona				
Angola	2023–24 Angolan Provincial Football Stage				
Angola	2023–24 Angolan Fourth Division				
(Democratic Republic of the Congo) DR Congo	2023–24 Linafoot Ligue 2				
(Democratic Republic of the Congo) DR Congo	2023–24 Provincial Leagues				
Egypt	2023–24 Egyptian Second Division A	Petrojet	Ghazl El Mahalla	1st	—N/a
Egypt	2023–24 Egyptian Second Division B				
Egypt	2023–24 Egyptian Third Division				
Egypt	2023–24 Egyptian Fourth Division				
Morocco	2023–24 Botola 2	COD Meknès	Difaâ El Jadidi	3rd	2010–11
Morocco	2023–24 Amateur National Championship	Union Yacoub El Mansour	Kenitra AC	2nd	2003–04
Morocco	2023–24 Amateur National I	(North Group) US Bejaad	(South Group) Chabab Houara		
Morocco	2023–24 Amateur National II	(North East Group) RS Berkane Espoir	(South Group) Wifak Asfi		
Nigeria	2023–24 National League				
Nigeria	2023–24 Nationwide League				
Nigeria	2023–24 Amateur League Division 2				
Nigeria	2023–24 Amateur League Division 3				
South Africa	2023–24 National First Division				
South Africa	2023–24 SAFA Second Division				
South Africa	2023–24 SAFA Regional League				
Tunisia	2023–24 Ligue Professionnelle 2				
Tunisia	2023–24 Ligue Professionnelle 3				
Tunisia	2023–24 Ligue Amateur 4				
Tunisia	2023–24 Ligue Amateur 5				
Zambia	2023–24 National Division One				
Zambia	2023–24 Provincial Division One				

=== CONCACAF ===
Nation	League	Champion	Second place	Title	Last honour
Canada	2024 Canadian Soccer League	Serbian White Eagles	Scarborough SC	6th	2022

=== CONMEBOL ===
Nation	League	Champion	Second place	Title	Last honour
Argentina	2024 Primera Nacional	Aldosivi	San Martín (T)	2nd	2017–18
Argentina	2024 Primera B	Colegiales	Los Andes	2nd	1928
Argentina	2024 Torneo Federal A	Central Norte	Sarmiento (LB)	1st	—N/a
Argentina	2024 Primera C	Real Pilar	General Lamadrid	1st	—N/a
Bolivia	2024 Copa Simón Bolívar	ABB	CDT Real Oruro	1st	—N/a
Brazil	2024 Campeonato Brasileiro Série B	Santos	Mirassol	1st	—N/a
Brazil	2024 Campeonato Brasileiro Série C	Volta Redonda	Athletic	1st	—N/a
Brazil	2024 Campeonato Brasileiro Série D	Retrô	Anápolis	1st	—N/a
Brazil	2024 Campeonato Cearense Série B	Tirol	Cariri	1st	—N/a
Brazil	2024 Campeonato Cearense Série C	Quixadá	Crato	1st	—N/a
Brazil	2024 Campeonato Acreano	Independência	Humaitá	12th	1998
Brazil	2024 Campeonato Alagoano	CRB	ASA	34th	2023
Brazil	2024 Campeonato Alagoano Second Division	Igaci	Zumbi	2nd	2006
Brazil	2024 Campeonato Amapaense	Trem	Oratório	9th	2023
Brazil	2024 Campeonato Amapaense Second Division	Portuguesa-AP	Cristal	1st	—N/a
Brazil	2024 Campeonato Amazonense	Manaus	Amazonas	6th	2022
Brazil	2024 Campeonato Amazonense Second Division	Sete	CDC Manicoré	1st	—N/a
Brazil	2024 Campeonato Paraense	Paysandu	Remo	50th	2021
Brazil	2024 Campeonato Baiano	Vitória	Bahia	30th	2017
Brazil	2024 Campeonato Baiano Second Division	Colo Colo	Porto-BA	3rd	2014
Brazil	2024 Campeonato Baiano Third Division				
Brazil	2024 Campeonato Pernambucano	Sport	Náutico	44th	2023
Brazil	2024 Campeonato Cearense	Ceará	Fortaleza	46th	2018
Brazil	2024 Campeonato Rondoniense	Porto Velho	Barcelona-RO	4th	2023
Brazil	2024 Campeonato Roraimense	GAS	São Raimundo	1st	—N/a
Brazil	2024 Campeonato Catarinense	Criciúma	Brusque	12th	2023
Brazil	2024 Campeonato Catarinense Série B	Caravaggio	Santa Catarina	1st	—N/a
Brazil	2024 Campeonato Catarinense Série C	Fluminense-SC	Porto-SC	1st	—N/a
Brazil	2024 Campeonato Paulista	Palmeiras	Santos	26th	2023
Brazil	2024 Campeonato Paulista Série A2	Velo Clube	Noroeste	2nd	1925
Brazil	2024 Campeonato Paulista Série A3	Votuporanguense	Grêmio Prudente	1st	—N/a
Brazil	2024 Campeonato Paulista Série A4	Rio Branco-SP	Francana	1st	—N/a
Brazil	2024 Campeonato Paulista Segunda Divisão	Paulista	Colorado Caieiras	1st	—N/a
Brazil	2024 Campeonato Sergipano	Confiança	Sergipe	23rd	2020
Brazil	2024 Campeonato Sergipano Série A2				
Brazil	2024 Campeonato Tocantinense	União-TO	Tocantinópolis	2nd	1994
Brazil	2024 Campeonato Tocantinense Second Division				
Brazil	2024 Campeonato Carioca	Flamengo	Nova Iguaçu	38th	2021
Brazil	2024 Campeonato Carioca Série A2	Maricá	Olaria	1st	—N/a
Brazil	2024 Campeonato Carioca Série B1				
Brazil	2024 Campeonato Carioca Série B2				
Brazil	2024 Campeonato Carioca Série C	Niteroiense	Uni Souza	1st	—N/a
Brazil	2024 Campeonato Mineiro	Atlético Mineiro	Cruzeiro	49th	2023
Brazil	2024 Campeonato Mineiro Módulo II	Betim	Aymorés	1st	—N/a
Brazil	2024 Campeonato Mineiro Segunda Divisão				
Brazil	2024 Campeonato Gaúcho	Grêmio	Juventude	43rd	2023
Brazil	2024 Campeonato Gaúcho Série A2	Monsoon	Pelotas	1st	—N/a
Brazil	2024 Campeonato Gaúcho Série B				
Brazil	2024 Campeonato Paranaense	Athletico Paranaense	Maringá	28th	2023
Brazil	2024 Campeonato Paranaense Série Prata	Paraná	Rio Branco-PR	2nd	2012
Brazil	2024 Campeonato Paranaense Série Bronze				
Chile	2024 Primera B de Chile	Deportes La Serena	Magallanes	4th	1996
Chile	2024 Segunda División Profesional de Chile				
Colombia	2024 Categoría Primera B	Unión Magdalena	Llaneros	2nd	2021–II
Ecuador	2024 Ecuadorian Serie B	Cuniburo	Manta	1st	—N/a
Paraguay	2024 Paraguayan División Intermedia	Deportivo Recoleta	Tembetary	2nd	2001
Peru	2024 Liga 2	Alianza Universidad	Juan Pablo II College	1st	—N/a
Peru	2024 Copa Perú				
Uruguay	2024 Segunda División	Plaza Colonia	Montevideo City Torque	1st	—N/a
Venezuela	2024 Segunda División	Yaracuyanos	Anzoátegui	2nd	2019

=== UEFA ===
Nation	League	Champion	Second place	Title	Last honour
Albania	2023–24 Kategoria e Parë	Elbasani	Bylis	1st	—N/a
Albania	2023–24 Kategoria e Dytë	Pogradeci	Valbona	3rd	1984–85
Albania	2023–24 Kategoria e Tretë	Basania	Memaliaj	1st	—N/a
Andorra	2023–24 Segona Divisió	La Massana	Rànger's	1st	—N/a
Armenia	2023–24 Armenian First League	Gandzasar Kapan		1st	—N/a
Austria	2023–24 Austrian Football Second League	Grazer AK	SV Ried	4th	1994–95
Austria	2023–24 Austrian Regionalliga East	SK Rapid Wien II	SR Donaufeld Wien	1st	—N/a
Austria	2023–24 Austrian Regionalliga Central	ASK Voitsberg		1st	—N/a
Austria	2023–24 Austrian Regionalliga West	SV Austria Salzburg	VfB Hohenems	1st	—N/a
Austria	2023–24 Burgenlandliga	ASV Siegendorf		6th	2021–22
Azerbaijan	2023–24 Azerbaijan First Division	Shamakhi	Qaradağ Lökbatan	1st	—N/a
Belgium	2023–24 Challenger Pro League	Beerschot	Dender	2nd	2019–20
Belgium	2023–24 Belgian National Division 1	RAAL La Louvière	Lokeren-Temse	1st	—N/a
Belgium	2023–24 Belgian Division 2	(VVA) Aalst		1st	—N/a
Belgium	2023–24 Belgian Division 2	(VVB) Belisia	Hasselt	1st	—N/a
Belgium	2023–24 Belgian Division 2	(ACFF) Mons	Rochefort	1st	—N/a
Belgium	2023–24 Belgian Division 3	(VVA) Westhoek	Hamme	1st	—N/a
Belgium	2023–24 Belgian Division 3	(VVB) Termien	Berg en Dal	1st	—N/a
Belgium	2023–24 Belgian Division 3	(ACFF A) Onhaye	Crossing Schaerbeek	1st	—N/a
Belgium	2023–24 Belgian Division 3	(ACFF B) Union Hutoise	Raeren-Eynatten	1st	—N/a
Bulgaria	2023–24 Second Professional Football League	Spartak Varna	Septemvri Sofia	8th	2005–06
Czech Republic	2023–24 Czech National Football League	Dukla Prague	Sigma Olomouc B	2nd	2010–11
Croatia	2023–24 First Football League	Šibenik	Zrinski Osječko 1664	3rd	2019–20
Croatia	2023–24 Second Football League	Opatija	Kustošija	1st	—N/a
Croatia	2023–24 Third Football League	(Division North) Polet (SMnM)	Rudar Mursko Središće	1st	—N/a
Croatia	2023–24 Third Football League	(Division West) Uljanik	Rovinj	1st	—N/a
Croatia	2023–24 Third Football League	(Division Center) Segesta	Gaj Mače	1st	—N/a
Croatia	2023–24 Third Football League	(Division East) Slavonija Požega	Čepin	1st	—N/a
Croatia	2023–24 Third Football League	(Division South) Zadar	Zagora Unešić	1st	—N/a
Denmark	2023–24 Danish 1st Division	SønderjyskE	AaB	2nd	2004–05
Denmark	2023–24 Danish 2nd Division	Esbjerg fB	FC Roskilde	1st	—N/a
Denmark	2023–24 Danish 3rd Division	BK Frem		1st	—N/a
England	2023–24 EFL Championship	Leicester City	Ipswich Town	2nd	2013–14
England	2023–24 EFL League One	Portsmouth	Derby County	1st	—N/a
England	2023–24 EFL League Two	Stockport County	Wrexham	1st	—N/a
England	2023–24 National League	(The National League) Chesterfield	Barnet	1st	—N/a
England	2023–24 National League	(National League North) Tamworth	Scunthorpe United	2nd	2008–09
England	2023–24 National League	(National League South) Yeovil Town	Chelmsford City	1st	—N/a
England	2023–24 Northern Premier League	(Premier Division) Radcliffe	Macclesfield	1st	—N/a
England	2023–24 Northern Premier League	(Division One West) Leek Town	Runcorn Linnets	1st	—N/a
England	2023–24 Northern Premier League	(Division One East) Hebburn Town	Stockton Town	1st	—N/a
England	2023–24 Northern Premier League	(Division One Midlands) Spalding United	Anstey Nomads	1st	—N/a
England	2023–24 Southern Football League	(Premier Division Central) Needham Market	AFC Telford United	1st	—N/a
England	2023–24 Southern Football League	(Premier Division South) Chesham United	AFC Totton	1st	—N/a
England	2023–24 Southern Football League	(Division One Central) Biggleswade Town	Bedford Town	1st	—N/a
England	2023–24 Southern Football League	(Division One South) Wimborne Town	Frome Town	1st	—N/a
England	2023–24 Isthmian League	(Premier Division) Hornchurch	Chatham Town	1st	—N/a
England	2023–24 Isthmian League	(North Division) Lowestoft Town	Bury Town	1st	—N/a
England	2023–24 Isthmian League	(South Central Division) Chertsey Town	Marlow	1st	—N/a
England	2023–24 Isthmian League	(South East Division) Cray Valley Paper Mills	Ramsgate	1st	—N/a
England	2023–24 Combined Counties Football League	(Premier Division North) Flackwell Heath	Rayners Lane	1st	—N/a
England	2023–24 Combined Counties Football League	(Premier Division South) Farnham Town	Jersey Bulls	1st	—N/a
England	2023–24 Combined Counties Football League	(Division One) Amersham Town	British Airways	1st	—N/a
England	2023–24 Eastern Counties Football League	(Premier Division) Mildenhall Town	Newmarket Town	1st	—N/a
England	2023–24 Eastern Counties Football League	(Division One North) Great Yarmouth Town	Framlingham Town	1st	—N/a
England	2023–24 Eastern Counties Football League	(Division One South) Benfleet	Wormley Rovers	1st	—N/a
France	2023–24 Ligue 2	Auxerre	Angers	2nd	1979–80
France	2023–24 Championnat National	Red Star	Martigues	3rd	2017–18
France	2023–24 Championnat National 2 Group A	Aubagne	Le Puy	1st	—N/a
France	2023–24 Championnat National 2 Group B	Paris 13 Atletico	La Roche	2nd	2021–22
France	2023–24 Championnat National 2 Group C	Boulogne	Saint-Malo	3rd	2004–05
France	2023–24 Championnat National 2 Group D	Bourg-Péronnas	Fleury	1st	—N/a
Germany	2023–24 2. Bundesliga	FC St. Pauli	Holstein Kiel	1st	—N/a
Germany	2023–24 3. Liga	SSV Ulm	Preußen Münster	1st	—N/a
Germany	2023–24 Regionalliga Nord	Hannover 96 II	SV Meppen	1st	—N/a
Germany	2023–24 Regionalliga Nordost	Energie Cottbus	Greifswalder FC	3rd	2022–23
Germany	2023–24 Regionalliga West	Alemannia Aachen	1. FC Bocholt	1st	—N/a
Germany	2023–24 Regionalliga Südwest	VfB Stuttgart II	Stuttgarter Kickers	1st	—N/a
Germany	2023–24 Regionalliga Bayern	FC Würzburger Kickers	DJK Vilzing	2nd	2014–15
Hungary	2023–24 Nemzeti Bajnokság II	Nyíregyháza	Győr	3rd	2013–14
Hungary	2023–24 Nemzeti Bajnokság III	(Northwest) Tatabánya	Bicske	1st	—N/a
Hungary	2023–24 Nemzeti Bajnokság III	(Northeast) Putnok	Cigánd	1st	—N/a
Hungary	2023–24 Nemzeti Bajnokság III	(Southwest) Szentlőrinc	Iváncsa	1st	—N/a
Hungary	2023–24 Nemzeti Bajnokság III	(Southeast) Békéscsaba	ESMTK	1st	—N/a
Italy	2023–24 Serie B	Parma	Como	1st	—N/a
Italy	2023–24 Serie C	(Group A) Mantova	Padova	2nd	1958–59
Italy	2023–24 Serie C	(Group B) Cesena	Torres	2nd	1967–68
Italy	2023–24 Serie C	(Group C) Juve Stabia	Avellino	1st	—N/a
Italy	2023–24 Serie D	(Group A) Alcione	Chisola	1st	—N/a
Italy	2023–24 Serie D	(Group B) Caldiero Terme	Piacenza	1st	—N/a
Italy	2023–24 Serie D	(Group C) Union Clodiense Chioggia	Dolomiti Bellunesi	1st	—N/a
Italy	2023–24 Serie D	(Group D) Carpi	Ravenna	3rd	1977–78
Italy	2023–24 Serie D	(Group E) Pianese	Follonica Gavorrano	2nd	2018–19
Italy	2023–24 Serie D	(Group F) Campobasso	L'Aquila	3rd	2020–21
Italy	2023–24 Serie D	(Group G) Cavese	Nocerina	4th	2002–03
Italy	2023–24 Serie D	(Group H) Team Altamura	Martina	3rd	1995–96
Italy	2023–24 Serie D	(Group I) Trapani	Siracusa	4th	1992–93
Moldova	2023–24 Moldovan Liga 1	FC Florești	Victoria Chișinău	2nd	2019
Moldova	2023–24 Moldovan Liga 2 (North)	Vulturii Cutezatori	EFA Visoca	1st	—N/a
Moldova	2023–24 Moldovan Liga 2 (South)	FC Stăuceni	FC Chișinău	1st	—N/a
Netherlands	2023–24 Eerste Divisie	Willem II	Groningen	4th	2013–14
Netherlands	2023–24 Tweede Divisie	Spakenburg	De Treffers	1st	—N/a
Netherlands	2023–24 Derde Divisie	(Group A) RKAV Volendam	IJsselmeervogels	1st	—N/a
Netherlands	2023–24 Derde Divisie	(Group B) Barendrecht	SteDoCo	1st	—N/a
North Macedonia	2023–24 Macedonian Second Football League	Besa	Pelister	1st	—N/a
Poland	2023–24 I liga	Lechia Gdańsk	GKS Katowice	3rd	2007–08
Poland	2023–24 II liga	Pogoń Siedlce	Kotwica Kołobrzeg	1st	—N/a
Poland	2023–24 III liga	(Group 1) Pogoń Grodzisk Mazowiecki	Unia Skierniewice	2nd	2020–21
Poland	2023–24 III liga	(Group 2) Świt Szczecin	Elana Toruń	1st	—N/a
Poland	2023–24 III liga	(Group 3) Rekord Bielsko-Biała	Śląsk Wrocław II	1st	—N/a
Poland	2023–24 III liga	(Group 4) Wieczysta Kraków	Siarka Tarnobrzeg	1st	—N/a
Portugal	2023–24 Liga Portugal 2	Santa Clara	Nacional	2nd	2000–01
Portugal	2023–24 Liga 3	Alverca	Felgueiras 1932	1st	—N/a
Portugal	2023–24 Campeonato de Portugal				
Romania	2023–24 Liga II	Unirea Slobozia	Corvinul Hunedoara	1st	—N/a
Scotland	2023–24 Scottish Championship	Dundee United	Raith Rovers	2nd	2019–20
Scotland	2023–24 Scottish League One	Falkirk	Hamilton Academical	2nd	1979–80
Scotland	2023–24 Scottish League Two	Stenhousemuir	Peterhead	1st	—N/a
Scotland	2023–24 Highland League	Buckie Thistle	Brechin City	12th	2016–17
Scotland	2023–24 Lowland League	East Kilbride	Heart of Midlothian B	3rd	2018–19
Serbia	2023–24 Serbian First League	OFK Beograd	Jedinstvo	1st	—N/a
Slovakia	2023–24 2. Liga	Komárno	Petržalka	1st	—N/a
Spain	2023–24 Segunda División	Leganés	Valladolid	1st	—N/a
Spain	2023–24 Primera Federación North	Deportivo La Coruña	Gimnàstic	1st	—N/a
Spain	2023–24 Primera Federacion South	Castellón	Córdoba	1st	—N/a
Spain	2023–24 Segunda Federacion Group 1	Ourense CF	Pontevedra	1st	—N/a
Spain	2023–24 Segunda Federacion Group 2	Bilbao Athletic	Barakaldo	1st	—N/a
Spain	2023–24 Segunda Federacion Group 3	Hércules	Europa	1st	—N/a
Spain	2023–24 Segunda Federacion Group 4	Sevilla Atlético	Yeclano	1st	—N/a
Spain	2023–24 Segunda Federacion Group 5	Gimnástica Segoviana	San Sebastián de los Reyes	1st	—N/a
Switzerland	2023–24 Challenge League	Sion	Thun	2nd	1969–70
Switzerland	2023–24 Promotion League	Étoile Carouge FC	FC Rapperswil-Jona	1st	—N/a
Wales	2023–24 Cymru North	Holywell Town	Flint Town United	1st	—N/a
Wales	2023–24 Cymru South	Briton Ferry Llansawel	Llanelli Town	1st	—N/a
Wales	2023–24 Ardal North East	Penrhyncoch	Bow Street	1st	—N/a
Wales	2023–24 Ardal North West	Flint Mountain	Llay Welfare	1st	—N/a
Wales	2023–24 Ardal South East	Trethomas Bluebirds	Newport City	1st	—N/a
Wales	2023–24 Ardal South West	Penrhiwceiber Rangers	Cefn Cribwr	1st	—N/a

=== OFC ===
Nation	League	Champion	Second place	Title	Last honour
Fiji	2024 Fiji Senior League				
New Zealand	2024 Northern League	Auckland City	Western Springs	4th	2023
New Zealand	2024 Central League	Wellington Olympic	Western Suburbs	6th	2023
New Zealand	2024 Southern League	Cashmere Technical	Coastal Spirit	2nd	2021
New Zealand	2024 NRFL Leagues	(Championship) Fencibles United	Manukau United	1st	—N/a
New Zealand	2024 NRFL Leagues	(Northern Conference) Waiheke United	Waitemata	1st	—N/a
New Zealand	2024 NRFL Leagues	(Southern Conference) Cambridge	Taupo	2nd	1993
New Zealand	2024 Central Federation League	Palmerston North United	Palmerston North Marist	1st	—N/a
New Zealand	2024 Capital Premier	Wellington Olympic Reserves	Miramar Rangers Reserves	3rd	2023
New Zealand	2024 Nelson Bays Premiership	Rangers	Nelson Suburbs Reserves	3rd	2022
New Zealand	2024 Canterbury Premiership	Waimakariri United	Burwood	1st	—N/a
New Zealand	2024 Southern Premiership	Mosgiel	Wanaka	3rd	2023

== Tier II to Tier V domestic cups ==
=== UEFA ===
Nation	League	Champion	Final score	Second place	Title	Last honour
England	2023–24 EFL Trophy	Peterborough United	2–1	Wycombe Wanderers	2nd	2013–14
England	2023–24 FA Trophy	Gateshead	2–2 (5–4 p)	Solihull Moors	1st	—
Finland	2024 Ykköscup	FF Jaro	1–0	SJK Akatemia	2nd	2022
Israel	2023–24 Toto Cup Leumit	Ironi Tiberias	1–0	Maccabi Kabilio Jaffa	1st	—
Italy	2023–24 Coppa Italia Serie C	Catania	5–4	Padova	1st	—
Italy	2023–24 Coppa Italia Serie D	Trapani	2–0	Follonica Gavorrano	1st	—
Italy	2023–24 Italian Amateur Cup	Paternò	1–0	Solbiatese	1st	—
Moldova	2024 Moldovan Winter Cup	FC Saksan	—	Zimbru Chișinău	1st	—
Norway	2024 OBOS Supercup	Skeid	2–0	Frigg Oslo	1st	—
Scotland	2023–24 Scottish Challenge Cup	Airdrieonians	2–1	(Wales) The New Saints	2nd	2008–09
Scotland	2023–24 Highland League Cup	Brora Rangers	1–1 (5–4 p)	Fraserburgh	3rd	2021–22
Scotland	2023–24 Lowland League Cup	Tranent Juniors	2–2 (5–4 p)	East Kilbride	1st	—
Scotland	2023–24 North of Scotland Cup	Nairn County	5–4 (aet)	Ross County B	8th	2012–13
Scotland	2023–24 Aberdeenshire Shield	Banks O' Dee	2–0	Aberdeen B	2nd	2021–22

=== AFC ===
Nation	League	Champion	Final score	Second place	Title	Last honour
Australia	2024 FSA Federation Cup					
Australia	2024 NPL Summer Cup	Devonport City	3–2	Kingborough Lions United	2nd	2023
Australia	2024 Dockerty Cup	South Melbourne	0–0 (a.e.t.) 5–4 (p)	Oakleigh Cannons	9th	2015
Singapore	2024 SFL Challenge Cup	Singapore Khalsa Association	1-0	Yishun Sentek Mariners	2nd	2023

=== CONMEBOL ===
Nation	League	Champion	Final score	Second place	Title	Last honour
Bolivia	2024 Copa Santa Cruz	Blooming	2–1	Oriente Petrolero	1st	—
Brazil	2024 Recopa Catarinense	Criciúma	2–0	Marcílio Dias	1st	—
Brazil	2024 Recopa Gaúcha	São Luiz	2–0	Grêmio	1st	—
Brazil	2024 Taça Padre Cícero	Maracanã Esporte Clube	—N/a	Iguatu	1st	—

=== Non–FIFA ===
Nation	League	Champion	Final score	Second place	Title	Last honour
Gozo	2024 G.F.A. Cup	Qala Saints	4–1	Nadur Youngsters	11th	2022–23
Gozo	2023–24 GFA First Division Knock-Out	Qala Saints	3–2	Nadur Youngsters	—N/a	—N/a
Gozo	2024 Second Division Knock-Out	Victoria Hotspurs	4–0	Żebbuġ Rovers	4th	2006–2007
Gozo	2023–24 Second Division Challenge Cup	Victoria Hotspurs	3–1 (a.e.t.)	Sannat Lions	1st	—

== Women's II to IV tier leagues ==
=== AFC ===
Nation	League	Champion	Second place	Title	Last honour
India	2023–24 Indian Women's League 2				
India	2023–24 Pondicherry Women's League				
India	2023–24 Goa Women's League	FC Tuem	Vintage 73	1st	—N/a
India	2023–24 Calcutta Women's Football League	Sreebhumi	East Bengal	1st	—N/a
India	2023–24 Assam Women's League	KASA	Sonari Town Club	1st	—N/a
India	2024 SSA Women's Football League				
India	2023–24 WIFA Women’s Football League	Mumbai Knights	Krida Prabodhini	2nd	2022–23
India	2023–24 Punjab Women's League	CRPF FC	GNDU Football Club	3rd	2021-22
Saudi Arabia	2023–24 Saudi Women's First Division League	Al-Ula	Al-Taraji	1st	—N/a
Singapore	2024 Women's National League	Mattar Sailors	Eastern Thunder	1st	—N/a

=== CAF ===
Nation	League	Champion	Second place	Title	Last honour
Algeria	2023–24 D1 National Championship				
Algeria	2023–24 D2 National Championship				
Morocco	2023–24 Morocco Women's Championship D2	RS Berkane	RCA Zemamra	1st	—
South Africa	2024 Sasol Women's League	Ezemvelo	UCT Ladies	1st	—

=== CONMEBOL ===
Nation	Tournament	Champion	Second place	Title	Last honour
Brazil	2024 Campeonato Brasileiro de Futebol Feminino Série A2	Bahia	3B da Amazônia	1st	—
Brazil	2024 Campeonato Brasileiro de Futebol Feminino Série A3	Vasco da Gama	Paysandu	1st	—

=== UEFA ===
Nation	League	Champion	Second place	Title	Last honour
Scotland	2023–24 SWPL 2	Queen's Park	Kilmarnock	3rd	2013
Scotland	2023–24 Scottish Women's Championship	Rossvale	Ayr United	1st	–
Scotland	2023–24 Scottish Women's League One	Stenhousemuir	Forfar Farmington	1st	–
Spain	2023–24 Primera Federación	FC Barcelona B	Deportivo de La Coruña	2nd	2022–23

=== OFC ===
Nation	League	Champion	Second place	Title	Last honour
New Zealand	2024 NRFL Women's Premiership	Auckland United	West Coast Rangers	2nd	2023
New Zealand	2024 Women's South Island League	Cashmere Technical	Dunedin City Royals	2nd	2023
New Zealand	2024 NRFL Women's Championship	FC Tauranga Moana	Franklin United	1st	—N/a
New Zealand	2024 Canterbury Women's Premiership	University of Canterbury	Nomads Waimakariri United	1st	—N/a

== Men's university leagues ==
=== AFC ===
Nation	League	Champion	Second place	Title	Last honour
Philippines	2023–24 UAAP Men's Football Championship (Season 86)				

=== CAF ===
Nation	League	Champion	Second place	Title	Last honour
South Africa	2024 Varsity Football	University of the Western Cape	North West University	2nd	2023

=== CONCACAF ===
Nation	League	Champion	Second place	Title	Last honour
Canada	2024 U Sports Men's Soccer Championship	UBC Thunderbirds	Montreal Carabins	14th	2013
United States	2024 NCAA Division I men's soccer tournament	Vermont Catamounts	Marshall Thundering Herd	1st	—N/a
United States	2024 NCAA Division II men's soccer tournament	Lynn Fighting Knights	Charleston Golden Eagles (Note: Represents the University of Charleston in West Virginia, and not to be confused with the Charleston Cougars, the Division I program representing the College of Charleston in South Carolina.)	4th	2014
United States	2024 NCAA Division III men's soccer tournament	Amherst Mammoths	Connecticut College Camels (Note: Not to be confused with the program of the University of Connecticut, the UConn Huskies.)	2nd	2015
United States	2024 NAIA Men's Soccer Championship	Dalton State Roadrunners	William Penn Statesmen	1st	—N/a

== Women's university leagues ==
=== AFC ===
Nation	League	Champion	Second place	Title	Last honour
Philippines	2023–24 UAAP Women's Football Championship (Season 86)				

=== CAF ===
Nation	League	Champion	Second place	Title	Last honour
South Africa	2024 Women's Varsity Football	UWC Ladies	TUT Ladies	3rd	2023

=== CONCACAF ===
Nation	League	Champion	Second place	Title	Last honour
Canada	2024 U Sports Women's Soccer Championship	UBC Thunderbirds	Laval Rouge et Or	9th	2023
United States	2024 NCAA Division I women's soccer tournament	North Carolina Tar Heels	Wake Forest Demon Deacons	22nd	2012
United States	2024 NCAA Division II women's soccer tournament	Cal Poly Pomona Broncos	Minnesota State Mavericks	1st	—N/a
United States	2024 NCAA Division III women's soccer tournament	Washington (MO) Bears	William Smith Herons	2nd	2016
United States	2024 NAIA Women's Soccer Championship	SCAD Bees	Keiser Seahawks	1st	—N/a

== Men's youth domestic leagues ==
=== UEFA ===
Nation	League	Champion	Second place	Title	Last honour
Germany	2023–24 Under 19 Bundesliga	TSG 1899 Hoffenheim U19	Borussia Dortmund U19	2nd	2013–14
Italy	2023–24 Campionato Primavera 1	Sassuolo	AS Roma	1st	—N/a
Italy	2023–24 Campionato Primavera 2	Cesena		2nd	2021-2022
Malta	2023–24 IFF Under-17 League Section A				
Malta	2023–24 IFF Under-17 League Section B				
Malta	2023–24 IFF Under-17 League Section C	Gozo U-17	Żabbar St. Patrick U-17	—N/a	—N/a
Malta	2023–24 IFF Under-17 League Section D	Marsaskala U-17	Rabat Ajax U-17	—N/a	—N/a
Malta	2023–24 IFF Under-15 League Section A	St. Andrews U-15	Mosta U-15	—N/a	—N/a
Malta	2023–24 IFF Under-15 League Section B	Hibernians U-15	Fgura United U-15	—N/a	—N/a
Malta	2023–24 IFF Under-15 League Section C	Swieqi United U-15	Rabat Ajax U-15	—N/a	—N/a
Malta	2023–24 IFF Under-15 League Section D	Pembroke Athleta U-15	Marsaxlokk U-15	—N/a	—N/a

=== AFC ===
Nation	League	Champion	Second place	Title	Last honour
India	2024 Reliance Foundation Development League				
Saudi Arabia	2023–24 U19 Youth League	Al-Hilal	Al-Ahli	11th	2021–22
Saudi Arabia	2023–24 U17 Youth League	Al-Ittihad	Al-Hilal	2nd	1994–95
Saudi Arabia	2023–24 U15 Youth League	Al-Nassr	Al-Ahli	1st	–
Saudi Arabia	2023–24 U13 Youth League	Al-Nassr	Al-Shabab	1st	–

=== CAF ===
Nation	League	Champion	Second place	Title	Last honour
Algeria	2023–24 Algerian U21 League				

=== OFC ===
Nation	League	Champion	Second place	Title	Last honour
New Zealand	2024 National Youth League	Wellington Phoenix Academy	Auckland United	2nd	2023

== Women's youth domestic leagues ==
=== UEFA ===
Nation	League	Champion	Second place	Title	Last honour
Malta	2023–24 Malta Women's Youth League	Swieqi United	Valletta	—N/a	—N/a
Malta	2023–24 BNF Women’s Under-16 League	Hibernians	Birkirkara	—N/a	—N/a
Moldova	2023–24 Liga WU16				
Moldova	2023–24 Liga WU14				
Moldova	2023–24 Liga WU12				

=== OFC ===
Nation	League	Champion	Second place	Title	Last honour
New Zealand	2024 Women's National Youth League	Wellington Phoenix Academy	Fencibles United	1st	—N/a

== Men's youth domestic cups ==
=== UEFA ===
Nation	League	Champion	Final score	Second place	Title	Last honour
England	2023–24 FA Youth Cup	Manchester City	4–0	Leeds United	8th	2019–20
Italy	2023–24 Coppa Italia Primavera	ACF Fiorentina	0–0 (a.e.t.) (5–3 p)	Torino FC	8th	2021-2022
Italy	2024 Supercoppa Primavera 2	Cesena	1–1 (6–5 p)	US Cremonese	2nd	2022
Malta	2023–24 Under-17 Knock-Out					
Malta	2023–24 Under-15 Knock-Out	St. Andrews U15	3–0	Pietà Hotspurs U15	—N/a	—N/a
Moldova	2024 Cupa Elitelor	AF Radu Rebeja-LIMPS	—N/a	Dacia Buiucani	1st	—

=== AFC ===
Nation	League	Champion	Final score	Second place	Title	Last honour
Australia	2024 U21 NPL Summer Cup	South Hobart	5–2	Riverside Olympic	1st	—

=== CAF ===
Nation	League	Champion	Final score	Second place	Title	Last honour
Algeria	2023–24 Reserve League Cup		–			
Algeria	2023–24 U19 Algerian Cup		–			
Algeria	2023–24 U17 Algerian Cup		–			
Algeria	2023–24 U15 Algerian Cup		–			

=== CONMEBOL ===
Nation	League	Champion	Final score	Second place	Title	Last honour
Brazil	2024 Copinha	SC Corinthians	1–0	Cruzeiro EC	11th	2017

== Women's youth domestic cups ==
=== UEFA ===
Nation	League	Champion	Final score	Second place	Title	Last honour
Malta	2024 Women’s Youth Knock-Out (final on 12 May 2024)					
Malta	2024 Women’s Under-16 Knock-Out	Birkirkara	6–1	Valletta	—N/a	—N/a

=== CAF ===
Nation	League	Champion	Final score	Second place	Title	Last honour
Algeria	2023–24 U20 W-Algerian Cup		–			
Algeria	2023–24 U17 W-Algerian Cup		–			
Algeria	2023–24 U15 W-Algerian Cup		–			

== Deaths ==
=== January ===
- 1 January – Mario Boljat, Croatian footballer
- 2 January
  - Ángel Castellanos, Spanish footballer
  - Alberto Festa, Portuguese footballer
  - Bobby Hoy, English footballer and manager
- 3 January – Bernard Ducuing, French footballer
- 5 January – Mário Zagallo, Brazilian footballer and manager
- 6 January – Zahirul Haque, Bangladeshi footballer
- 7 January – Franz Beckenbauer, German footballer and manager
- 11 January – Salvatore Mazzarano, Italian footballer
- 16 January – Klaus Wunder, German footballer
- 22 January – Gigi Riva, Italian football player and manager

=== February ===
- 2 February – Stefan Yanev, Bulgarian footballer
- 4 February – Kurt Hamrin, Swedish footballer
- 7 February – Miguel Ángel, Spanish footballer
- 17 February – Eddie Mitchell, English football club owner
- 20 February – Andreas Brehme, German footballer
- 22 February – Artur Jorge, Portuguese football player and manager
- 24 February – Stan Bowles, English footballer

=== March ===
- 3 February – Roberto Fleitas, Uruguayan football player and manager

=== April ===
- 3 April – Luke Fleurs, South African footballer
- 7 April – Joe Kinnear, Irish football player and manager
- 15 April – Bernd Hölzenbein, German footballer
- 19 April – Leighton James, Welsh footballer
- 22 April – Charlie Hurley, Irish football player and manager
- 29 April – Mykhaylo Fomenko, Ukrainian football player and coach

=== May ===
- 1 May – Terry Medwin, Welsh footballer
- 5 May – César Luis Menotti, Argentine football player and manager
- 14 May – Fabián Cancelarich, Argentine footballer
- 20 May – Karl-Heinz Schnellinger, German footballer

=== June ===
- 13 June – Tommy Banks, English footballer
- 15 June
  - Matija Sarkic, Montenegrin footballer
  - Kevin Campbell, English footballer
- 23 June
  - Angelo Paina, Italian footballer
  - Hugo Villanueva, Chilean footballer
- 25 June – José Antonio Urtiaga, Spanish footballer
- 27 June
  - Manuel Fernandes, Portuguese football player and manager
  - Landry Nguémo, Cameroonian footballer

=== July ===
- 2 July
  - Comunardo Niccolai, Italian footballer
  - Jeff Whitefoot, English footballer
- 6 July - Ahmed Refaat, Egyptian footballer
- 11 July - Stanley Tshabalala, South African football player and coach

=== August ===
- 1 August
  - Tommy Cassidy, Northern Irish football player and manager
  - Craig Shakespeare, English footballer and coach
- 5 August
  - Adílio, Brazilian football player
  - George Herd, Scottish football player and manager
- 7 August 2024 – Jim Moyes New Zealand footballer.
- 12 August
  - Ramiro Blacut, Bolivian football player and manager
  - Marc Bourrier, French football player and coach
  - Roy Greaves, English footballer
  - Willi Lemke, German football manager
- 13 August – Charles Hughes, English football coach
- 18 August
  - Ronny Borchers, German football player and coach
  - Franciszek Smuda, Polish football player and manager
- 20 August
  - Malcolm Bland, New Zealand footballer
  - Humberto Maschio, Argentine-Italian football player and manager
- 21 August – Paquito García, Spanish football player and manager
- 24 August – Christoph Daum, German football player and manager
- 26 August – Sven-Göran Eriksson, Swedish football player and manager
- 27 August – Juan Izquierdo, Uruguayan footballer
- 31 August – Sol Bamba, French-Ivory Coast football player and manager

=== September ===
- 6 September – Ron Yeats, Scottish football player and manager
- 16 September – Gary Shaw, English footballer
- 18 September
  - Sam Malcolmson, New Zealand footballer
  - Salvatore Schillaci, Italian footballer

=== October ===
- 6 October – Johan Neeskens, Dutch football player and manager
- 9 October – George Baldock, English-Greek footballer
- 22 October – Bernd Bauchspieß, East German footballer
- 24 October – Abdelaziz Barrada, French-Moroccan footballer
- 25 October
  - Tommy Callaghan, Scottish footballer
  - Zé Carlos, Brazilian footballer

=== November ===
- 6 November – John Dempsey, England football player and manager
- 8 November – Rachid Mekhloufi, Algerian football player and manager
- 9 November
  - José Garrido, Portuguese football player and manager
  - Hassan Akesbi, Moroccan footballer
- 11 November
  - Coşkun Taş, Turkish footballer
  - Marco Angulo, Ecuadorian footballer
- 12 November – Kalambay Otepa, Congolese footballer
- 13 November – Luis Ernesto Tapia, Panamanian footballer
- 14 November – Andrzej Sykta, Polish footballer
- 15 November
  - Trygve Bornø, Norwegian footballer and sports administrator
  - Michael Osei, Ghanaian football player and coach
  - Frank Schäffer, German footballer
- 17 November
  - Bernard Chiarelli, French football player and manager
  - Hugo Villaverde, Chilean footballer
- 21 November – Vicente de la Mata, Argentine footballer
- 26 November – Jan Furtok, Polish footballer

=== December ===
- 2 December – Helmut Duckadam, Romanian footballer
- 8 December – Nikos Sarganis, Greek footballer
- 30 December – Hugo Sotil, Peruvian footballer
