= 2024 Federation Cup (Bangladesh) final =

Football championship match

2024 Federation Cup final
- Event: 2023–24 Federation Cup
Mohammedan SC	Bashundhara Kings
1	2
- After extra time
- Date: 22 May 2024
- Venue: Rafiq Uddin Bhuiyan Stadium, Mymensingh
- Man of the Match: Miguel Figueira (Bashundhara Kings)
- Referee: Mohammad Josim Akhtar
- Attendance: 10,000

The 2024 Federation Cup final was the final match of the 2023–24 Federation Cup, the 35th season of the Federation Cup. It was played at Rafiq Uddin Bhuiyan Stadium in Mymensingh on 22 May 2024 between the defending champions Mohammedan SC and Bashundhara Kings.

Bashundhara Kings won the match 2–1, for their third Federation Cup title and second double.

== Route to the final ==
- Both Mohammedan SC (Group B) and Bashundhara Kings (Group C) won theirs all group stage matches.

Bashundhara Kings		Round	Mohammedan SC	
Opponent	Result	Group stage	Result	Opponent
Fortis FC	1–0	Matchday 1	2–1	Chittagong Abahani
Sheikh Russel KC	1–0	Matchday 2	2–1	Brothers Union
(Note: Due to three teams group Bashundhara Kings played only two matches.)		Matchday 3	2–1	Dhaka Abahani
Group C winners: Pos / Team / Pld / Pts; 1 / Bashundhara Kings / 2 / 6; 2 / Fortis FC / 2 / 3; 3 / Sheikh Russel KC / 2 / 0; Source: Soccerway		Final standings	Group B winners: Pos / Team / Pld / Pts; 1 / Mohammedan SC / 3 / 9; 2 / Abahani Limited Dhaka / 3 / 6; 3 / Chittagong Abahani / 3 / 3; 4 / Brothers Union / 3 / 0; Source: Soccerway	
Opponent	Result	Knockout stage	Result	Opponent
Rahmatganj MFS	2–0	Quarter-final	2–1	Sheikh Russel KC
Dhaka Abahani	2–1	Semi-final	2–1	Bangladesh Police FC

== Match ==
=== Details ===
22 May 2024
15:00 BST

Mohammedan SC	1–2 (a.e.t.)	Bashundhara Kings
Emmanuel 63'	Report	Figueira 87' Hossain

Rafiq Uddin Bhuiyan Stadium, Mymensingh
Referee: Mohammad Josim Akhtar

Mohammedan	Bashundhara Kings

Manager: (Spain) Óscar Bruzón	Manager: (Bangladesh) Alfaz Ahmed

Man of the Match:
Miguel Figueira (Bashundhara Kings)

Match rules

- 90 minutes
- 30 minutes of extra time if necessary
- Penalty shoot-out if scores still level
- Nine named substitutes
- Maximum of five substitutions, with a sixth allowed in extra time (Note: Each team was given only three opportunities to make substitutions, with a fourth opportunity in extra time, excluding substitutions made at half-time, before the start of extra time and at half-time in extra time.)
