= Krida Prabodhini =

State-run residential sports training network in Maharashtra, India

- Formation: 2001
- Type: Sports development
- Owner: Government of Maharashtra
- Website: mahasports.maharashtra.gov.in/schemes-programmes

The Krida Prabodhini (क्रीडा प्रबोधिनी, lit. Sports Awakening) is a network of residential sports academies established by the Government of Maharashtra to identify and nurture young athletic talent across the state. Introduced in 2001 as part of the Maharashtra State Sports Policy, the program targets children aged 8 to 14 years, providing them with scientific training, modern facilities, and academic support to develop into national and international-level athletes.

It operates through a network of residential centers across Maharashtra, focusing on 15 priority sports disciplines. It aims to foster a sports culture, promote physical fitness, and produce Olympic-caliber players by tapping into hidden talents, particularly from rural and underprivileged backgrounds. Major training centers are situated in Pune, Aurangabad, Nagpur, and Nashik.

== History ==
The Government of Maharashtra inaugurated the Krida Prabodhini (sports academy) on 31 January 1996 at Pune and started sports academies at 11 places in the state. The accommodation, food, education, sports uniforms etc. of the students selected in the sports academies are met from the provision of the government's sports academy. An average of Rs. 7,500/- is spent on each player per month.

In 2001, the initiative was formalized as the Krida Prabodhini Scheme under the Maharashtra State Sports Policy, a 10-year framework aimed at enhancing physical fitness and sports development across all age groups — including children, youth, adults, and persons with disabilities. This policy aligned with national efforts such as the establishment of the Ministry of Youth Affairs and Sports by the Government of India in 1982 and subsequent planning commissions focused on sports infrastructure.

By 2012, stricter selection norms were proposed to ensure higher-quality intake, emphasizing rigorous testing for the 8–14 age group. In 2013, the government approved non-residential Krida Prabodhini centers to accommodate talented players unwilling or unable to relocate, providing equipment and coaching without lodging. In 2015, a new Krida Prabodhini center was launched in Nashik at the Meenatai Thackeray Stadium in Panchavati by the Adivasi Vikas Vibhag (Tribal Development Department). This center focused on training tribal students aged 8 to 12.

The program faced disruptions during the COVID-19 pandemic, with hostels at Balewadi converted into COVID Care Centres in 2020 and 2021, forcing athletes to train remotely and impacting their fitness and competition schedules. In 2022, expansions included non-residential admission options, prioritizing state-level medal winners to broaden access. The Krida Prabodhini is administered by the Directorate of Sports and Youth Services under the Department of Sports, Maharashtra.

== Objectives ==
The primary goal of the Krida Prabodhini Scheme is to identify and nurture promising young athletes to compete at national and international levels, including the Olympics Games. Key objectives include:

- Providing technical and scientific training tailored to individual abilities and sports requirements.
- Ensuring balanced nutrition, modern sports equipment, and residential facilities to support holistic development.
- Promoting physical fitness and a sports culture among Maharashtra's youth, with an emphasis on inclusivity for rural and marginalized children.
- Integrating academic education with sports training to produce well-rounded individuals.
- The scheme seeks to address talent gaps by focusing on early intervention, aiming to elevate Maharashtra's performance in competitive sports.

=== Structure and selection process ===
The program operates through 11 residential Krida Prabodhini centers strategically located across Maharashtra to ensure regional coverage: Aurangabad, Amravati, Akola, Gadchiroli, Kolhapur, Nagpur, Nashik, Pravaranagar, Pune, Sangli, and Thane.

Sports coaches are appointed on an honorarium basis, with training schedules allocating sufficient time for practice, skill enhancement, and recovery. Selection involves skill tests, fitness assessments (e.g., endurance batteries), and academic evaluations. Non-residential options provide equipment and expert coaching for local talent.

== Sports disciplines ==
The scheme covers 15 core sports, selected for their potential in Olympic and national competitions:

- Athletics
- Archery
- Badminton
- Boxing
- Diving
- Football
- Gymnastics
- Handball
- Hockey
- Judo
- Shooting
- Swimming
- Table tennis
- Weightlifting
- Wrestling

== Infrastructure ==
Krida Prabodhini operates within the broader framework of the Maharashtra State Sports Policy, which includes infrastructure development and financial support for sports promotion across the state.

=== Sports complexes ===
The policy outlines a three-tier plan for sports infrastructure:

- Divisional Sports Complexes: Proposed in cities like Nagpur, Amravati, Aurangabad, Nashik, and Pune, these complexes are designed to offer national-level facilities. Each complex is eligible for government funding up to ₹24 crore. Facilities include stadiums, swimming pools, gyms, indoor halls, and hostels.
- District Sports Complexes: A budget of ₹8 crore is proposed for each district-level complex. As of recent updates, 29 such complexes are under construction.
- Taluka Sports Complexes: These are planned in phases across all talukas, with financial assistance up to ₹1 crore per complex, subject to land availability of at least 2.5 acres.

== Financial assistance ==
The government offers a range of sports-related grants and incentives to promote athletic development and participation. Recognized sports councils and local bodies receive annual funding for operations, equipment, and competitions, while secondary schools excelling in district-level events are awarded ₹15,000 under the School Incentive Scheme. Institutions can receive up to ₹21 lakh for constructing standard-size swimming pools, and registered bodies may procure combat sports and gym equipment with a 75% subsidy. Athletes representing India internationally are eligible for up to ₹20,000 in travel reimbursements, and state federations can organize pre-national training camps with financial aid. State teams participating in national events receive support for travel, kits, and allowances, and federations whose athletes win medals at senior national competitions qualify for performance-based grants. Additionally, track suits and kits are distributed to athletes competing at the national level.

== See also ==
- Sports in India
