= 2024 Under-20 Four Nations Tournament =

Tournament details
- Host country: Malawi
- Dates: 20–24 March
- Teams: 3 (from 1 confederation)

Final positions
- Champions: Malawi (1st title)
- Runners-up: Kenya
- Third place: Zimbabwe

Tournament statistics
- Matches played: 3
- Goals scored: 13 (4.33 per match)

The 2024 Under-20 Four Nations Tournament was an association football tournament held in Malawi. The tournament was originally set to be held from 18 March to 26 March 2024, but the dates were changed due to the withdrawal of Zambia, the new dates were set as 20 March to 24 March 2024. It was hosted alongside the 2024 Four Nations Football Tournament.

The tournament was won by Malawi.

== Group stage ==
| Pos | Team | Pld | W | D | L | GF | GA | GD | Pts |
|---|---|---|---|---|---|---|---|---|---|
| 1 | Malawi (C, H) | 2 | 2 | 0 | 0 | 6 | 3 | +3 | 6 |
| 2 | Kenya | 2 | 1 | 0 | 1 | 4 | 4 | 0 | 3 |
| 3 | Zimbabwe | 2 | 0 | 0 | 2 | 3 | 6 | −3 | 0 |

Updated to match(es) played on 24 March 2024. Source: Owinna
(C) Champions; (H) Hosts
