= 2023–24 Kuwait Emir Cup =

2024 Emir Cup
- Dates: 26/01/2024 - 21/05/2024

Final positions
- Champions: Qadsia SC
- Runners-up: Al-Salmiya SC

Tournament statistics
- Matches played: 14
- Goals scored: 42 (3 per match)
- Top goal scorers: (3 each): Vitor da Silva Vieira (Fahaheel SC); Alex Lima (Al-Salmiya SC); Ibrahima Tandia (Qadsia SC)

The 2023–24 Kuwaiti Amir Cup was the 61st edition of the Amir Cup, the premier domestic knockout football competition in Kuwait. The tournament was organized by the Kuwait FA.

The final was held on 21 May 2024 at Jaber Al-Ahmad International Stadium in Kuwait City. Al-Qadsia won the title after defeating Al-Salmiya by a score of 1–0, securing their latest Amir Cup championship.

== Format ==
The competition followed a knockout format, with clubs from different divisions of Kuwaiti football participating. Matches were played as single-elimination fixtures, with extra time and penalty shootouts used to determine winners if necessary.

== Participating teams ==
League	Club
Kuwait Premier League	Al-Kuwait
Kuwait Premier League	Al Arabi
Kuwait Premier League	Al-Qadsia
Kuwait Premier League	Al-Salmiya
Kuwait Premier League	Fahaheel
Kuwait Premier League	Al Naser
Kuwait Premier League	Kazma
Kuwait Premier League	Khaitan
Kuwait Premier League	Al-Jahra
Kuwait Premier League	Al-Shabab
Kuwaiti Division One	Al-Yarmouk
Kuwaiti Division One	Al-Tadamon
Kuwaiti Division One	Al-Sahel
Kuwaiti Division One	Al-Sulaibikhat
Kuwaiti Division One	Burgan

== Bracket ==
Round-of-16
Al-Kuwait
N/A
Al-Tadamon	2(5)
Al-Jahra	2(4)
Al-Salmiya	1(4)
Khaitan	1(2)
Kazma	1
Burgan	0
Al-Arabi	1
Al-Sulaibikhat	0
Al-Nasar	2
Al-Sahel	1
Al-Qadsia	2
Al-Yarmouk	1
Al-Shabab	1
Al-Fahaheel	4

Quarter-finals
Al-Kuwait	1(4)
Al-Tadamon	1(5)
Al-Salmiya	4(4)
Kazma	4(3)
Al-Arabi	3
Al-Nasar	1
Al-Qadsia	2
Al-Fahaheel	1

Semi-finals
Al-Tadamon	0
Al-Salmiya	3
Al-Arabi	1
Al-Qadsia	2

Final
Al-Salmiya	0
Al-Qadsia	1

== Final ==
=== Final match ===
Al-Qadsia vs Al-Salmiya

Date: 21 May 2024

Venue: Jaber Al-Ahmad International Stadium, Kuwait City

Result: Al-Qadsia 1–0 Al-Salmiya

Al-Qadsia secured the title with a narrow victory in the final, successfully defending their position as the most successful club in the history of the competition.

== Champions ==
Al-Qadsia lifted the Amir Cup after a disciplined performance in the final, adding another trophy to their domestic honours.

== See also ==
- Kuwait Football Association
- 2023–24 Kuwaiti Premier League
