= 1999 Qatar Crown Prince Cup =

1999 Crown Prince Cup
Heir Apparent Cup

Tournament details
- Host country: Qatar
- Teams: 4

Final positions
- Champions: Al-Wakrah (1st title)

The 1999 Qatar Crown Prince Cup was the 5th edition of this cup tournament in men's football (soccer). It was played by the top four teams of the Q-League.

Al-Wakrah were crowned champions for the first time.

== Results ==
Semi-finals
(Qatar)	Al-Wakrah	1	3	4
(Qatar)	Al-Arabi	1	0	1
(Qatar)	Al-Ittihad	1	3	4
(Qatar)	Al-Sadd	0	0	0

Final
(Qatar)	Al-Wakrah	2
(Qatar)	Al-Ittihad	1

1999 Qatar Crown Prince Cup
Winners
Al-Wakrah
1st Title
