= 1978–79 Irish Cup =

Tournament details
- Country: Northern Ireland
- Teams: 16

Final positions
- Champions: Cliftonville (8th win)
- Runners-up: Portadown

Tournament statistics
- Matches played: 17
- Goals scored: 68 (4 per match)

The 1978–79 Irish Cup was the 99th edition of the Irish Cup, Northern Ireland's premier football knock-out cup competition.

The defending champions were Linfield, who defeated Ballymena United 3–1 in the 1977–78 final. However, they were knocked out by eventual winners Cliftonville in the first round. Cliftonville went on to win the cup for the 8th time, defeating Portadown 3–2 in the final. The 1979 victory represented their first cup success in 70 years; this remains a record for the longest gap between Irish Cup wins. This was Cliftonville's last Irish Cup success until the club won the Irish Cup for the first time in 45 years in 2024, though they had reached the final five times since this win; in 1997, 1999, 2009, 2013 and 2018. They lost the 1997, 2009, 2013 and 2018 finals, and were disqualified before the final was played in 1999 when it was discovered that they had fielded an ineligible player in the earlier rounds.

== Results ==
=== First round ===
Team 1	Score	Team 2
Ards	1–3	Portadown
Ballymena United	2–1	Crusaders
Coleraine	5–2	Downpatrick Rec.
Distillery	0–2	Banbridge Town
Glenavon	4–1	Bangor
Larne	3–2	Glentoran
Linfield	3–4	Cliftonville
Omagh Town	2–6	RUC

=== Quarter-finals ===
Team 1	Score	Team 2
Coleraine	2–3	Cliftonville
Glenavon	3–2	Banbridge Town
Portadown	2–1^{1}	Ballymena United
RUC	0–1	Larne

^{1}This tie required a replay, after the first game ended as a 0–0 draw.

=== Semi-finals ===
Team 1	Score	Team 2
Cliftonville	1–0^{2}	Larne
Portadown	2–1	Glenavon

^{2}This tie required a replay, after the first game ended as a 2–2 draw.

=== Final ===
28 April 1979

Cliftonville	3 – 2	Portadown
Platt 32'; Adair 46'; Bell 89'	Report	Campbell 2'; Alexander 77'

Windsor Park, Belfast
