= 2024 National Premier Leagues Queensland =

67th season of the NSW Premier League

National Premier Leagues Queensland
- Season: 2024
- Dates: 23 February 2024 – 16 August 2024
- Goals: 5
- All statistics correct as of 9 June 2024.

The 2024 National Premier Leagues Queensland Men's is the twelfth season of Association football in Queensland under the banner of the National Premier Leagues and the second season under the revised competition format. The season began on 23 February 2024 and is scheduled to conclude on 16 August 2024.

Gold Coast Knights are the defending champions.

== Regular season ==
The 2024 season is a double round-robin format, with each team playing 22 games. The season started on 23 February, and is scheduled to conclude on 16 August.

=== Table ===
Pos	Team	Pld	W	D	L	GF	GA	GD	Pts	Qualification or relegation
1	Gold Coast Knights (A)	21	18	1	2	58	25	+33	55	2024 NPL Queensland Finals
2	Moreton City Excelsior (A)	20	14	3	3	57	25	+32	45	2024 NPL Queensland Finals
3	Peninsula Power (A)	21	14	2	5	47	23	+24	44	2024 NPL Queensland Finals
4	Lions (A)	21	13	3	5	62	26	+36	42	2024 NPL Queensland Finals
5	Wynnum Wolves	21	10	2	9	41	61	−20	32	
6	Brisbane Roar Youth	22	6	6	10	33	43	−10	24	
7	Olympic	21	6	5	10	29	31	−2	23	
8	Gold Coast United	20	5	8	7	28	31	−3	23	
9	Sunshine Coast Wanderers	22	6	4	12	28	44	−16	22	
10	Brisbane City	21	6	2	13	27	41	−14	20	
11	Rochedale Rovers (R)	21	4	4	13	17	44	−27	16	Relegation to the 2024 Queensland Premier League 1
12	Redlands United (R)	21	1	6	14	17	50	−33	9	Relegation to the 2024 Queensland Premier League 1

Updated to match(es) played on 16 August 2024. Source: Soccerway
Rules for classification: 1) points; 2) goal difference; 3) number of goals scored.
(A) Advance to a further round; (R) Relegated

=== Fixtures and results ===
Home \ Away	BCY	BRI	GCK	GCU	LFC	MCE	OLY	PEN	RED	ROC	SCW	WYN
Brisbane City	—	1–0	1–2		0–3	0–1	0–4	2–4	1–0	0–0	3–2	2–3
Brisbane Roar Youth	2–3	—	0–1	1–1	0–5	1–3	3–2	1–1		1–1	2–0	1–1
Gold Coast Knights	3–1	4–2	—	5–1		2–5	3–1	3–2	4–1	2–0	4–2	9–0
Gold Coast United	3–0	0–3	1–2	—	3–2		1–1	2–3	4–0	2–2	0–0	2–1
Lions	6–0	1–2			—	1–2	3–2	3–1	0–0	3–2	4–0	3–4
Moreton City Excelsior	3–1	3–2			2–4	—	1–1	1–3	7–0	2–0	5–0	6–3
Olympic		1–1	0–1	0–0	0–2	1–1	—	0–3	3–0	2–0	0–2	3–1
Peninsula Power	1–0	4–0	1–0	3–1	0–3	0–0	3–1	—		2–1	1–2	5–0
Redlands United	0–2	1–1	0–1	0–0	2–4	0–1	1–3	0–4	—	0–1	2–2	0–1
Rochedale Rovers	0–8	1–5	1–2	2–0	0–4		0–1	0–2	2–2	—	1–0	1–4
Sunshine Coast Wanderers	2–1	3–0	0–1	0–4	3–1	3–5	1–0	1–3	2–2	0–1	—	1–1
Wynnum Wolves	1–0	2–3	3–5		0–7	0–4	4–3	2–1	5–2	2–1	3–2	—

Updated to match(es) played on 16 August 2024. Source: Soccerway
Legend: Blue = home team win; Yellow = draw; Red = away team win.
For upcoming matches, an "a" indicates there is an article about the rivalry between the two participants.
