= 2023–24 Kuwaiti Division One =

Kuwaiti Division One
- Season: 2023–24
- Champions: Al-Yarmouk
- Promoted: Al-Yarmouk; Al-Tadamon

38th edition of the tournament. Al-Yarmouk won the league.

== League table ==
The league table, consisting of 5 teams in which the top 2 clubs get promoted to the Kuwaiti Premier League.

Pos	Team	Pld	W	D	L	GF	GA	GD	Pts	Promotion
1	Al-Yarmouk (C)	16	9	6	1	26	15	+11	33	Promotion to Kuwaiti Premier League
2	Al-Tadamon (P)	16	6	8	2	26	16	+10	26	Promotion to Kuwaiti Premier League
3	Al-Sahel	16	6	7	3	24	18	+6	25	
4	Burgan	16	2	6	8	20	28	−8	12	
5	Al-Sulaibikhat	16	1	5	10	12	31	−19	8	

Updated to match(es) played on unknown. Source:
(C) Champions; (P) Promoted
