= 2023 in association football =

The following are the scheduled events of association football for the calendar year 2023 throughout the world. This includes the following:

- In countries whose league seasons fall within a single calendar year, the 2023 season.
- In countries which crown one champion in a season that spans two calendar years, the 2022–23 season.
- In countries which split their league season into two championships, a system often known in Latin America as Apertura and Clausura, all championships awarded in calendar 2023.

== Events ==
=== Men's national teams ===
==== FIFA ====
- 20 May – 11 June: 2023 FIFA U-20 World Cup in Argentina
  - (gold) : Uruguay
  - (silver) : Italy
  - (bronze) : Israel
  - 4th: South Korea
- 10 November – 2 December: 2023 FIFA U-17 World Cup in Indonesia
  - (gold) : Germany
  - (silver) : France
  - (bronze) : Mali
  - 4th: Argentina

==== AFC ====
- 1–18 March: 2023 AFC U-20 Asian Cup in Uzbekistan
  - (gold) : Uzbekistan
  - (silver) : Iraq
- 16–26 March: 2023 AFC Beach Soccer Asian Cup in Thailand
  - (gold) : Iran
  - (silver) : Japan
  - (bronze) : Oman
  - 4th: United Arab Emirates
- 15 June – 2 July: 2023 AFC U-17 Asian Cup in Thailand
  - (gold) : Japan
  - (silver) : South Korea
- 19 September – 7 October: Football at the 2022 Asian Games – Men's tournament in China
  - (gold) : South Korea
  - (silver) : Japan
  - (bronze) : Uzbekistan
  - 4th: Hong Kong

===== EAFF =====
- 18–22 August: Football at the 2023 East Asian Youth Games – Men's tournament in Mongolia
  - (gold) : Chinese Taipei
  - (silver) : Hong Kong
  - (bronze) : Mongolia
  - 4th: Macau
- 1–9 September: 2023 EAFF U-15 Men's Championship in China
  - (gold) : China
  - (silver) : Japan
  - (bronze) : South Korea
  - 4th: Chinese Taipei

===== AFF =====
- 20 December 2022 – 16 January 2023: 2022 AFF Championship
  - (gold) : Thailand
  - (silver) : Vietnam
- 17–26 August: 2023 AFF U-23 Championship in Thailand
  - (gold) : Vietnam
  - (silver) : Indonesia
  - (bronze) : Thailand
  - 4th: Malaysia

===== SAFF =====
- 21 June – 4 July: 2023 SAFF Championship in India
  - (gold) : India
  - (silver) : Kuwait
- 1–10 September: 2023 SAFF U-16 Championship in Bhutan
  - (gold) : India
  - (silver) : Bangladesh
- 21–30 September: 2023 SAFF U-19 Championship in Nepal
  - (gold) : India
  - (silver) : Pakistan

===== WAFF =====
- 12–20 June: 2023 WAFF U-23 Championship in Iraq
  - (gold) : Iraq
  - (silver) : Iran
- TBA: 2023 WAFF Championship in United Arab Emirates

===== AGCFF =====
- 6–19 January: 25th Arabian Gulf Cup in Iraq
  - (gold) : Iraq
  - (silver) : Oman

===== CAFA =====
- 19–29 May: 2023 CAFA U-20 Championship in Tajikistan
  - (gold) : Uzbekistan
  - (silver) : Iran
  - (bronze) : Tajikistan
  - 4th: Afghanistan
- 10–20 June: 2023 CAFA Nations Cup in Kyrgyzstan and Uzbekistan
  - (gold) : Iran
  - (silver) : Uzbekistan
  - (bronze) : Oman
  - 4th: Kyrgyzstan
- 23–30 July: 2023 CAFA Futsal Cup in Tajikistan
  - (gold) : Iran
  - (silver) : Afghanistan
  - (bronze) : Uzbekistan
  - 4th: Tajikistan
- 18–28 August: 2023 CAFA Youth Championship in Tajikistan
  - (gold) : Tajikistan
  - (silver) : Uzbekistan
  - (bronze) : Afghanistan
  - 4th: Iran

==== UAFA ====
- 6–16 June: 2023 Arab Futsal Cup in Saudi Arabia
  - (gold) : Morocco
  - (silver) : Kuwait
- 2–14 July: Football at the 2023 Pan Arab Games in Algeria
  - (gold) : Saudi Arabia
  - (silver) : Syria
  - (bronze) : Sudan
  - 4th: Algeria

==== CAF ====
- 13 January – 4 February: 2022 African Nations Championship in Algeria
  - (gold) : Senegal
  - (silver) : Algeria
  - (bronze) : Madagascar
  - 4th: Niger
- 19 February – 11 March: 2023 U-20 Africa Cup of Nations in Egypt
  - (gold) : Senegal
  - (silver) : Gambia
  - (bronze) : Nigeria
  - 4th: Tunisia
- 29 April – 19 May: 2023 U-17 Africa Cup of Nations in Algeria
  - (gold) : Senegal
  - (silver) : Morocco
  - (bronze) : Burkina Faso
  - 4th: Mali
- 24 June – 8 July: 2023 Africa U-23 Cup of Nations in Morocco
  - (gold) : Morocco
  - (silver) : Egypt
  - (bronze) : Mali
  - 4th: Guinea

===== COSAFA =====
- 5–16 July: 2023 COSAFA Cup in South Africa
  - (gold) : Zambia
  - (silver) : Lesotho
  - (bronze) : South Africa
  - 4th: Malawi
- 4-15 October: 2023 COSAFA Women's Championship in South Africa
- (gold) : Malawi
- (silver) : Zambia
- (bronze) : Mozambique
- 4th: Zimbabwe

===== UNAF =====
- 11–22 November: 2023 UNAF U-20 Tournament in Tunisia
  - (gold) : Tunisia
  - (silver) : Morocco
  - (bronze) : Egypt
  - 4th: Libya
- 14–18 March: 2023 UNAF U-20 Women's Tournament in Tunisia
  - (gold) : Morocco
  - (silver) : Algeria
  - (bronze) : Egypt
  - 4th: Tunisia

===== UNIFFAC =====
- 1–7 July: UNIFFAC U-20 Cup in Democratic Republic of the Congo
  - (gold) : Gabon
  - (silver) : DR Congo
  - (bronze) : Congo
  - 4th: Central African Republic

===== WAFU =====
- 7–21 July: 2023 WAFU Zone B U-20 Boy's Cup in Ivory Coast
  - (gold) : Ivory Coast
  - (silver) : Burkina Faso
  - (bronze) : Benin
  - 4th: Togo

==== CONCACAF ====
- 11–26 February: 2023 CONCACAF U-17 Championship in Guatemala
  - (gold) : Mexico
  - (silver) : United States
- 8–14 May: 2023 CONCACAF Beach Soccer Championship in Bahamas
  - (gold) : United States
  - (silver) : Mexico
  - (bronze) : El Salvador
  - 4th: Bahamas
- 15–18 June: 2023 CONCACAF Nations League Finals in the United States
  - (gold) : United States
  - (silver) : Canada
  - (bronze) : Mexico
  - 4th: Panama
- 24 June – 16 July: 2023 CONCACAF Gold Cup in the United States
  - (gold) : Mexico
  - (silver) : Panama
- 28 June – 6 July: Football at the 2023 Central American and Caribbean Games – Men's tournament in El Salvador
  - (gold) : Mexico
  - (silver) : Costa Rica
  - (bronze) : Honduras
  - 4th: El Salvador
- 6–13 August: 2023 CONCACAF Boys' Under-15 Championship in Curaçao & Dominican Republic
  - (gold) : United States
  - (silver) : Mexico
  - (bronze) : Haiti
  - 4th: Jamaica

==== CONMEBOL ====
- 19 January – 12 February: 2023 South American U-20 Championship in Colombia
  - (gold) : Brazil
  - (silver) : Uruguay
  - (bronze) : Colombia
  - 4th: Ecuador
- 11–19 March: 2023 Copa América de Beach Soccer in Argentina
  - (gold) : Brazil
  - (silver) : Argentina
  - (bronze) : Colombia
  - 4th: Paraguay
- 30 March – 23 April: 2023 South American U-17 Championship in Ecuador
  - (gold) : Brazil
  - (silver) : Ecuador
  - (bronze) : Argentina
  - 4th: Venezuela
- 6–13 August: 2023 South American Under-20 Beach Soccer Championship in Chile
  - (gold) : Paraguay
  - (silver) : Brazil
  - (bronze) : Chile
  - 4th: Colombia
- 23 October – 4 November: Football at the 2023 Pan American Games – Men's tournament in Chile
  - (gold) : Brazil
  - (silver) : Chile
  - (bronze) : Mexico
  - 4th: United States

==== OFC ====
- 11–28 January: 2023 OFC U-17 Championship in Fiji
  - (gold) : New Zealand
  - (silver) : New Caledonia
  - (bronze) : Tahiti
  - 4th: Fiji
- 21–26 August: 2023 OFC Beach Soccer Nations Cup in Tahiti
  - (gold) : Tahiti
  - (silver) : Solomon Islands
  - (bronze) : Fiji
  - 4th: Tonga
- 27 August – 9 September: 2023 OFC Men's Olympic Qualifying Tournament in New Zealand
  - (gold) : New Zealand
  - (silver) : Fiji
- 1–7 October: 2023 OFC Futsal Nations Cup in New Zealand
  - (gold) : New Zealand
  - (silver) : Tahiti
  - (bronze) : Solomon Islands
  - 4th: Fiji
- 17 November – 2 December: Football at the 2023 Pacific Games – Men's tournament in the Solomon Islands
  - (gold) : New Caledonia
  - (silver) : Solomon Islands
  - (bronze) : Fiji
  - 4th: Vanuatu

==== UEFA ====
- 17 May – 2 June: 2023 UEFA European Under-17 Championship in Hungary
  - (gold) : Germany
  - (silver) : France
- 14–18 June: 2023 UEFA Nations League Finals in Netherlands
  - (gold) : Spain
  - (silver) : Croatia
  - (bronze) : Italy
  - 4th: Netherlands
- 21 June – 8 July: 2023 UEFA European Under-21 Championship in Romania and Georgia
  - (gold) : England
  - (silver) : Spain
- 3–16 July: 2023 UEFA European Under-19 Championship in Malta
  - (gold) : Italy
  - (silver) : Portugal

==== International men's tournaments ====
- 24–26 March: 2023 Merlion Cup in Singapore
  - (gold) : Malaysia
  - (silver) : Hong Kong
  - (bronze) : Cambodia
  - 4th: Singapore
- 22–28 March: 2023 Doha Cup U23 in Qatar
  - (gold) : South Korea
  - (silver) : United Arab Emirates
  - (bronze) : Kuwait
  - 4th: Thailand
- 22–31 March: 2023 Prime Minister's Three Nations Cup in Nepal
  - (gold) : Nepal
  - (silver) : Laos
  - (bronze) : Bhutan
- 5–18 June: 2023 Maurice Revello Tournament in France
  - (gold) : Panama
  - (silver) : Mexico
  - (bronze) : Australia
  - 4th: France
- 9–18 June: 2023 Intercontinental Cup in India
  - (gold) : India
  - (silver) : Lebanon
  - (bronze) : Vanuatu
  - 4th: Mongolia
- 11–18 June: 2023 Mauritius Four Nations Cup in Mauritius
  - (gold) : Djibouti
  - (silver) : Mauritius
  - (bronze) : Kenya
  - 4th: Pakistan
- 14–18 June: 2023 Under-19 Baltic Cup in Estonia/Finland/Latvia/Lithuania
  - (gold) : Finland
  - (silver) : Latvia
  - (bronze) : Estonia
  - 4th: Lithuania
- 28 June – 2 July: 2023 Under-17 Baltic Cup in Estonia/Finland/Latvia/Lithuania
  - (gold) : Finland
  - (silver) : Estonia
  - (bronze) : Lithuania
  - 4th: Latvia
- 9 – 14 July: Football at the 2023 Island Games in Guernsey
  - (gold) : Jersey
  - (silver) : Ynys Môn
  - (bronze) : Isle of Wight
  - 4th: Bermuda
- 28 July – 6 August: Football at the 2023 Jeux de la Francophonie in Democratic Republic of the Congo
  - (gold) : Cameroon
  - (silver) : Burkina Faso
  - (bronze) : Niger
  - 4th: Benin
- 13–17 October: 2023 Jordan International Tournament in Jordan
  - (gold) : Iran
  - (silver) : Qatar
  - (bronze) : Iraq
  - 4th: Jordan

=== Women's national teams ===
==== FIFA ====
- 6 April: 2023 Women's Finalissima in England
  - (gold) : England
  - (silver) : Brazil
- 20 July – 20 August: 2023 FIFA Women's World Cup in Australia and New Zealand
  - (gold) : Spain
  - (silver) : England
  - (bronze) : Sweden
  - 4th: Australia

==== AFC ====
- 4–10 January: 2023 WAFF U-16 Girls Championship in Jordan
  - (gold) : Lebanon
  - (silver) : Jordan
  - (bronze) : Palestine
  - 4th: Bahrain
- 27–31 January: 2023 CAFA Women's Futsal Championship in Uzbekistan
  - (gold) : Iran
  - (silver) : Uzbekistan
  - (bronze) : Tajikistan
  - 4th: Kyrgyzstan
- 3–9 February: 2023 SAFF U-20 Women's Championship in Bangladesh
  - (gold) : Bangladesh
  - (silver) : Nepal
  - (bronze) : India
  - 4th: Bhutan
- 12–16 March: 2023 CAFA U-17 Women's Championship in Tajikistan
  - (gold) : Uzbekistan
  - (silver) : Iran
  - (bronze) : Kyrgyzstan
  - 4th: Tajikistan
- 20–31 March: 2023 SAFF U-17 Women's Championship in Bangladesh
  - (gold) : Russia
  - (silver) : Bangladesh
  - (bronze) : India
  - 4th: Nepal
- 5–15 July: 2023 AFF U-19 Women's Championship in Indonesia
  - (gold) : Thailand
  - (silver) : Vietnam
  - (bronze) : Myanmar
  - 4th: Indonesia
- 17–21 August: Football at the 2023 East Asian Youth Games – Women's tournament in Mongolia
  - (gold) : South Korea
  - (silver) : China
  - (bronze) : Hong Kong
  - 4th: Mongolia
- 21 September – 6 October: Football at the 2022 Asian Games – Women's tournament in China
  - (gold) : Japan
  - (silver) : North Korea
  - (bronze) : China
  - 4th: Uzbekistan
- 15–19 October: CAFA U14 Girls' Championship

==== CAF ====
- 20–29 January: 2023 WAFU Zone A Women's Cup in Cape Verde
  - (gold) : Senegal
  - (silver) : Cape Verde
  - (bronze) : Gambia
  - 4th: Guinea-Bissau
- 14–18 March: 2023 UNAF U-20 Women's Tournament in Tunisia
  - (gold) : Morocco
  - (silver) : Algeria
  - (bronze) : Egypt
  - 4th: Tunisia
- 20 May – 3 June: 2023 WAFU Zone B U-20 Women's Cup in Ghana
  - (gold) : Ghana
  - (silver) : Nigeria
  - (bronze) : Burkina Faso
  - 4th: Benin
- 24 May – 3 June: 2023 WAFU Zone A U-20 Women's Cup in Sierra Leone
  - (gold) : Senegal
  - (silver) : Guinea
  - (bronze) : Sierra Leone
  - 4th: Guinea-Bissau
- 25 July – 4 August: 2023 CECAFA U-18 Women's Championship in Tanzania
  - (gold) : Tanzania
  - (silver) : Uganda
  - (bronze) : Ethiopia
  - 4th: Burundi

==== CONCACAF ====
- 3–12 March: 2023 UNCAF Women's U-19 Tournament in Honduras
  - (gold) : El Salvador
  - (silver) : Panama
  - (bronze) : Costa Rica
  - 4th: Honduras
- 24 May – 3 June: 2023 CONCACAF Women's U-20 Championship in the Dominican Republic
  - (gold) : Mexico
  - (silver) : United States
  - (bronze) : Canada
  - 4th: Costa Rica
- 11–18 June: 2023 UNCAF Women's U-16 Tournament in Guatemala
  - (gold) : Costa Rica
  - (silver) : Panama
  - (bronze) : El Salvador
  - 4th: Guatemala
- 28 June – 7 July: Football at the 2023 Central American and Caribbean Games – Women's tournament in El Salvador
  - (gold) : Mexico
  - (silver) : Venezuela
  - (bronze) : El Salvador
  - 4th: Centro Caribe Sports
- 18–28 August: 2023 CFU Girls' U14 Challenge Series in Antigua and Barbuda
  - Tier 1:
    - (gold) : Puerto Rico
    - (silver) : Aruba
  - Tier 2:
    - (gold) : Martinique
    - (silver) : Guadeloupe

==== CONMEBOL ====
- 22 October – 3 November: Football at the 2023 Pan American Games – Women's tournament in Chile
  - (gold) : Mexico
  - (silver) : Chile
  - (bronze) : United States
  - 4th: Argentina

==== OFC ====
- 21 June – 8 July: 2023 OFC U-19 Women's Championship in Fiji
  - (gold) : New Zealand
  - (silver) : Fiji
  - (bronze) : Samoa
  - 4th: Cook Islands
- 13–30 September: 2023 OFC U-16 Women's Championship in Tahiti
  - (gold) : New Zealand
  - (silver) : Fiji
  - (bronze) : Tahiti
  - 4th: Tonga
- 17 November – 1 December: Football at the 2023 Pacific Games – Women's tournament in the Solomon Islands
  - (gold) : Papua New Guinea
  - (silver) : Fiji
  - (bronze) : New Caledonia
  - 4th: Samoa

==== UEFA ====
- 17–19 March: UEFA Women's Futsal Euro 2023 in Hungary
  - (gold) : Spain
  - (silver) : Ukraine
  - (bronze) : Portugal
  - 4th: Hungary
- 14–26 May: 2023 UEFA Women's Under-17 Championship in Estonia
  - (gold) : France
  - (silver) : Spain
- 18–30 July: 2023 UEFA Women's Under-19 Championship in Belgium
  - (gold) : Spain
  - (silver) : Germany

==== International women's tournaments ====
- 11–19 January: 2023 SAFF Women's Friendly Tournament I in Saudi Arabia
  - (gold) : Saudi Arabia
  - (silver) : Pakistan
  - (bronze) : Comoros
  - 4th: Mauritius
- 15–21 February: 2023 Turkish Women's Cup in Turkey
  - (gold) : Slovenia and Kosovo
  - (silver) : South Africa and Bulgaria
- 15–21 February: 2023 Women's Revelations Cup in Mexico
  - (gold) : Mexico
  - (silver) : Colombia
  - (bronze) : Nigeria
  - 4th: Costa Rica
- 15–21 February: 2023 Pinatar Cup in Spain
  - (gold) : Iceland
  - (silver) : Wales
  - (bronze) : Scotland
  - 4th: Philippines
- 15–21 February: 2023 Tournoi de France in France
  - (gold) : France
  - (silver) : Denmark
  - (bronze) : Norway
  - 4th: Uruguay
- 16–22 February: 2023 Arnold Clark Cup in England
  - (gold) : England
  - (silver) : Belgium
  - (bronze) : Italy
  - 4th: South Korea
- 16–22 February: 2023 Cup of Nations in Australia
  - (gold) : Australia
  - (silver) : Spain
  - (bronze) : Czech Republic
  - 4th: Jamaica
- 16–22 February: 2023 Cyprus Women's Cup in Cyprus
  - (gold) : Finland
  - (silver) : Croatia
  - (bronze) : Romania
  - 4th: Hungary
- 16–22 February: 2023 SheBelieves Cup in the United States
  - (gold) : United States
  - (silver) : Japan
  - (bronze) : Brazil
  - 4th: Canada
- 6–10 April: 2023 BFU International Women's Cup in Bulgaria
  - (gold) : Kosovo
  - (silver) : Bulgaria
  - (bronze) : Lithuania
  - 4th: Latvia
- 16–21 May: 2023 Sud Ladies Cup in France
  - (gold) : Japan
  - (silver) : Cameroon
  - (bronze) : France
  - 4th: Panama
- 28 June – 2 July: 2023 Women's U19 Baltic Cup in Latvia
  - (gold) : Latvia
  - (silver) : Estonia
  - (bronze) : Lithuania
- 9 – 14 July: Football at the 2023 Island Games in Guernsey
  - (gold) : Bermuda
  - (silver) : Western Isles
  - (bronze) : Isle of Man
  - 4th: Menorca
- 28 June – 2 July: 2023 Women's U17 Baltic Cup in Latvia
  - (gold) : Estonia
  - (silver) : Lithuania
  - (bronze) : Latvia
- 18–30 September: 2023 SAFF Women's Friendly Tournament 2 in Saudi Arabia
  - (gold) : Lebanon
  - (silver) : Bhutan
  - (bronze) : Malaysia

== Club continental champions ==
=== Men ===
| Region | Tournament | Defending champion | Champion | Title | Last honour |
|---|---|---|---|---|---|
| AFC (Asia) | 2023–24 AFC Champions League | (Japan) Urawa Red Diamonds | Competition moved to 2023–24 season | | |
| AFC (Asia) | 2023–24 AFC Cup | (Oman) Al-Seeb | Competition moved to 2023–24 season | | |
| CAF (Africa) | 2022–23 CAF Champions League | (Morocco) Wydad AC | (Egypt) Al Ahly | 11th | 2020–21 |
| CAF (Africa) | 2022–23 CAF Confederation Cup | (Morocco) Berkane | (Algeria) USM Alger | 1st | — |
| CAF (Africa) | 2023 African Football League | First edition | (South Africa) Mamelodi Sundowns | 1st | — |
| CAF (Africa) | 2023 CAF Super Cup | (Morocco) Berkane | (Algeria) USM Alger | 1st | — |
| CONCACAF (North and Central America, Caribbean) | 2023 CONCACAF Champions League | (United States) Seattle Sounders FC | (Mexico) Club León | 1st | — |
| CONCACAF (North and Central America, Caribbean) | 2023 Leagues Cup | (Mexico) Club León (2021) | (United States) Inter Miami CF | 1st | — |
| CONCACAF (North and Central America, Caribbean) | 2023 CONCACAF Central American Cup | First edition | (Costa Rica) Alajuelense | 1st | — |
| CONCACAF (North and Central America, Caribbean) | 2023 CONCACAF Caribbean Cup | First edition | (Suriname) Robinhood | 1st | — |
| CONCACAF (North and Central America, Caribbean) | 2023 CONCACAF Caribbean Shield | (Puerto Rico) Bayamón | (Suriname) Robinhood | 2nd | 2019 |
| CONMEBOL (South America) | 2023 Copa Libertadores | (Brazil) Flamengo | (Brazil) Fluminense | 1st | — |
| CONMEBOL (South America) | 2023 Copa Sudamericana | (Ecuador) Independiente del Valle | (Ecuador) LDU Quito | 2nd | 2009 |
| CONMEBOL (South America) | 2023 Recopa Sudamericana | (Brazil) Palmeiras | (Ecuador) Independiente del Valle | 1st | — |
| CONMEBOL (South America) | 2023 U-20 Copa Libertadores | (Uruguay) Peñarol | (Argentina) Boca Juniors | 1st | — |
| OFC (Oceania) | 2023 OFC Champions League | (New Zealand) Auckland City | (New Zealand) Auckland City | 11th | 2022 |
| UEFA (Europe) | 2022–23 UEFA Champions League | (Spain) Real Madrid | (England) Manchester City | 1st | — |
| UEFA (Europe) | 2022–23 UEFA Europa League | (Germany) Eintracht Frankfurt | (Spain) Sevilla | 7th | 2019–20 |
| UEFA (Europe) | 2022–23 UEFA Europa Conference League | (Italy) Roma | (England) West Ham United | 1st | — |
| UEFA (Europe) | 2023 UEFA Super Cup | (Spain) Real Madrid | (England) Manchester City | 1st | — |
| UEFA (Europe) | 2022–23 UEFA Youth League | (Portugal) Benfica | (Netherlands) AZ Alkmaar | 1st | — |
| UEFA (Europe) | 2023 UEFA–CONMEBOL Club Challenge | First edition | (Spain) Sevilla FC | 1st | — |
| UAFA (Arab States) | 2023 Arab Club Champions Cup | (Morocco) Raja CA (2019–20) | (Saudi Arabia) Al Nassr | 1st | — |
| FIFA (Global) | 2023 FIFA Club World Cup | (Spain) Real Madrid | (England) Manchester City | 1st | — |

=== Women ===
| Region | Tournament | Defending champion | Champion | Title | Last honour |
|---|---|---|---|---|---|
| AFC (Asia) | 2023 AFC Women's Club Championship | (Thailand) College of Asian Scholars (East) (Uzbekistan) Sogdiana Jizzakh (West) | (South Korea) Incheon Hyundai Steel Red Angels and (Japan) Urawa Red Diamonds | 1st | — |
| CAF (Africa) | 2023 CAF Women's Champions League | (Morocco) AS FAR | (South Africa) Mamelodi Sundowns | 2nd | 2021 |
| CONMEBOL (South America) | 2023 Copa Libertadores Femenina | (Brazil) Palmeiras | (Brazil) Corinthians | 4th | 2021 |
| OFC (Oceania) | 2023 OFC Women's Champions League | First edition | (New Caledonia) AS Academy | 1st | — |
| UEFA (Europe) | 2022–23 UEFA Women's Champions League | (France) Lyon | (Spain) Barcelona | 2nd | 2020–21 |

== National leagues ==
=== UEFA ===
| Nation | League | Champion | Second place | Title | Last honour |
|---|---|---|---|---|---|
| Albania | 2022–23 Kategoria Superiore | Partizani | Tirana | 17th | 2018–19 |
| Andorra | 2022–23 Primera Divisió | Atlètic Club d'Escaldes | Inter Club d'Escaldes | 1st | — |
| Armenia | 2022–23 Armenian Premier League | Urartu | Pyunik | 2nd (Note: Urartu's total includes one title under the earlier name of Banants.) | 2013–14 |
| Austria | 2022–23 Austrian Football Bundesliga | Red Bull Salzburg | Sturm Graz | 17th | 2021–22 |
| Azerbaijan | 2022–23 Azerbaijan Premier League | Qarabağ | Sabah | 10th | 2021–22 |
| Belarus | 2023 Belarusian Premier League | Dinamo Minsk | Neman Grodno | 8th | 2004 |
| Belgium | 2022–23 Belgian Pro League | Antwerp | Genk | 5th | 1956–57 |
| Bosnia and Herzegovina | 2022–23 Premier League of Bosnia and Herzegovina | Zrinjski Mostar | Borac Banja Luka | 8th | 2021–22 |
| Bulgaria | 2022–23 First Professional Football League | Ludogorets Razgrad | CSKA Sofia | 12th | 2021–22 |
| Croatia | 2022–23 Croatian Football League | Dinamo Zagreb | Hajduk Split | 24th | 2021–22 |
| Cyprus | 2022–23 Cypriot First Division | Aris Limassol | APOEL | 1st | — |
| Czech Republic | 2022–23 Czech First League | Sparta Prague | Slavia Prague | 34th | 2013–14 |
| Denmark | 2022–23 Danish Superliga | Copenhagen | Nordsjælland | 15th | 2021–22 |
| England | 2022–23 Premier League | Manchester City | Arsenal | 9th | 2021–22 |
| Estonia | 2023 Meistriliiga | Flora | Levadia | 15th | 2022 |
| Faroe Islands | 2023 Faroe Islands Premier League | KÍ | Víkingur Gøta | 21st | 2022 |
| Finland | 2023 Veikkausliiga | HJK | KuPS | 33rd | 2022 |
| France | 2022–23 Ligue 1 | Paris Saint-Germain | Lens | 11th | 2021–22 |
| (Georgia (country)) Georgia | 2023 Erovnuli Liga | Dinamo Batumi | Dinamo Tbilisi | 2nd | 2021 |
| Germany | 2022–23 Bundesliga | Bayern Munich | Borussia Dortmund | 33rd | 2021–22 |
| Gibraltar | 2022–23 Gibraltar Football League | Lincoln Red Imps | Europa | 27th | 2021–22 |
| Greece | 2022–23 Super League Greece | AEK Athens | Panathinaikos | 13th | 2017–18 |
| Hungary | 2022–23 Nemzeti Bajnokság I | Ferencváros | Kecskemét | 34th | 2021–22 |
| Iceland | 2023 Besta deild karla | Víkingur Reykjavík | Valur | 7th | 2021 |
| Israel | 2022–23 Israeli Premier League | Maccabi Haifa | Hapoel Be'er Sheva | 15th | 2021–22 |
| Italy | 2022–23 Serie A | Napoli | Lazio | 3rd | 1989–90 |
| Kazakhstan | 2023 Kazakhstan Premier League | Ordabasy | Astana | 1st | — |
| Kosovo | 2022–23 Football Superleague of Kosovo | Ballkani | Drita | 2nd | 2021–22 |
| Latvia | 2023 Latvian Higher League | RFS | Riga | 2nd | 2021 |
| Lithuania | 2023 A Lyga | Panevėžys | Žalgiris | 1st | — |
| Luxembourg | 2022–23 Luxembourg National Division | Swift Hesperange | Progrès Niederkorn | 1st | — |
| Malta | 2022–23 Maltese Premier League | Ħamrun Spartans | Birkirkara | 9th | 2020–21 |
| Moldova | 2022–23 Moldovan Super Liga | Sheriff Tiraspol | Petrocub Hîncești | 21st | 2021–22 |
| Montenegro | 2022–23 Montenegrin First League | Budućnost Podgorica | Sutjeska Nikšić | 6th | 2020–21 |
| Netherlands | 2022–23 Eredivisie | Feyenoord | PSV Eindhoven | 16th | 2016–17 |
| North Macedonia | 2022–23 Macedonian First Football League | Struga | Shkupi | 1st | — |
| Northern Ireland | 2022–23 NIFL Premiership | Larne | Linfield | 1st | — |
| Norway | 2023 Eliteserien | Bodø/Glimt | Brann | 3rd | 2021 |
| Poland | 2022–23 Ekstraklasa | Raków Częstochowa | Legia Warsaw | 1st | — |
| Portugal | 2022–23 Primeira Liga | Benfica | Porto | 38th | 2018–19 |
| Republic of Ireland | 2023 League of Ireland Premier Division | Shamrock Rovers | Derry City | 21st | 2022 |
| Romania | 2022–23 SuperLiga | Farul Constanța | FCSB | 1st | — |
| Russia | 2022–23 Russian Premier League | Zenit Saint Petersburg | CSKA Moscow | 10th | 2021–22 |
| San Marino | 2022–23 Campionato Sammarinese di Calcio | Tre Penne | Cosmos | 5th | 2018–19 |
| Scotland | 2022–23 Scottish Premiership | Celtic | Rangers | 53rd | 2021–22 |
| Serbia | 2022–23 Serbian SuperLiga | Red Star Belgrade | TSC | 34th | 2021–22 |
| Slovakia | 2022–23 Slovak First Football League | Slovan Bratislava | DAC Dunajská Streda | 13th | 2021–22 |
| Slovenia | 2022–23 Slovenian PrvaLiga | Olimpija Ljubljana | Celje | 3rd | 2017–18 |
| Spain | 2022–23 La Liga | Barcelona | Real Madrid | 27th | 2018–19 |
| Sweden | 2023 Allsvenskan | Malmö FF | IF Elfsborg | 23rd | 2021 |
| Switzerland | 2022–23 Swiss Super League | Young Boys | Servette | 16th | 2020–21 |
| Turkey | 2022–23 Süper Lig | Galatasaray | Fenerbahçe | 23rd | 2018–19 |
| Ukraine | 2022–23 Ukrainian Premier League | Shakhtar Donetsk | Dnipro-1 | 14th | 2019–20 |
| Wales | 2022–23 Cymru Premier | The New Saints | Connah's Quay Nomads | 15th | 2021–22 |

=== AFC ===
| Nation | League | Champion | Second place | Title | Last honour |
|---|---|---|---|---|---|
| Australia | 2022–23 A-League Men | Central Coast Mariners (Note: In A-League Men (as well as its female counterpart of A-League Women), the term "champions" refers to the winner of the playoff tournament (known in Australian English as the "finals series") that follows the league season. The team that tops the league table is designated "premiers".) | Melbourne City | 2nd (Note: Reflects only wins in the Grand Final, the last match of the A-League Men finals series.) | 2012–13 |
| Bahrain | 2022–23 Bahraini Premier League | Al-Khaldiya | Manama | 1st | — |
| Bangladesh | 2022–23 Bangladesh Premier League | Bashundhara Kings | Dhaka Abahani | 4th | 2021–22 |
| China | 2023 Chinese Super League | Shanghai Port | Shandong Taishan | 2nd | 2018 |
| Hong Kong | 2022–23 Hong Kong Premier League | Kitchee | Lee Man | 6th | 2021–22 |
| India | 2022–23 Indian Super League | ATK Mohun Bagan | Bengaluru | 1st | — |
| Indonesia | 2022–23 Liga 1 | PSM Makassar | Persija Jakarta | 1st | — |
| Iran | 2022–23 Persian Gulf Pro League | Persepolis | Sepahan | 15th | 2020–21 |
| Iraq | 2022–23 Iraqi Premier League | Al-Shorta | Al-Quwa Al-Jawiya | 6th | 2021–22 |
| Japan | 2023 J1 League | Vissel Kobe | Yokohama F. Marinos | 1st | — |
| Kuwait | 2022–23 Kuwaiti Premier League | Kuwait SC | Al-Arabi | 18th | 2021–22 |
| Lebanon | 2022–23 Lebanese Premier League | Al Ahed | Nejmeh | 9th | 2022–23 |
| Palestine | 2022–23 Gaza Strip Premier League | Khadamat Rafah SC | Shabab Rafah | 7th | 2019–20 |
| Palestine | 2022–23 West Bank Premier League | Jabal Al-Mukaber Club | Hilal Al-Quds Club | 2nd | 2009–10 |
| Philippines | 2022 Philippines Football League | Kaya-Iloilo | DH Cebu | 1st | — |
| Qatar | 2022–23 Qatar Stars League | Al-Duhail | Al-Arabi | 8th | 2019–20 |
| Saudi Arabia | 2022–23 Saudi Professional League | Al-Ittihad | Al Nassr | 9th | 2008–09 |
| Singapore | 2023 Singapore Premier League | Albirex Niigata (S) | Lion City Sailors | 6th | 2002 |
| South Korea | 2023 K League 1 | Ulsan Hyundai | Pohang Steelers | 4th | 2022 |
| Thailand | 2022–23 Thai League 1 | Buriram United | Bangkok United | 9th | 2021–22 |
| United Arab Emirates | 2022–23 UAE Pro League | Shabab Al Ahli | Al Ain | 8th | 2015–16 |

=== CAF ===
| Nation | League | Champion | Second place | Title | Last honour |
|---|---|---|---|---|---|
| Algeria | 2022-23 Algerian Ligue Professionnelle 1 | CR Belouizdad | CS Constantine | 10th | 2021-22 |
| Cameroon | 2022–23 Elite One | Coton Sport | Bamboutos | 18th | 2021–22 |
| Egypt | 2022–23 Egyptian Premier League | Al Ahly | Pyramids | 43rd | 2019–20 |
| Ethiopia | 2022–23 Ethiopian Premier League | Saint George | Bahir Dar Kenema | 16th | 2021–22 |
| Ghana | 2022–23 Ghana Premier League | Medeama | Aduana Stars | 1st | – |
| Morocco | 2022–23 Botola | AS FAR | Wydad AC | 13th | 2007–08 |
| Mauritius | 2022–23 Mauritian Premier League | GRSE Wanderers | Pamplemousses | 1st | – |
| Nigeria | 2022–23 Nigeria Professional Football League | Enyimba | Remo Stars | 9th | 2019 |
| South Africa | 2022–23 South African Premier Division | Mamelodi Sundowns | Orlando Pirates | 13th | 2021–22 |
| Zambia | 2022–23 Zambia Super League | Power Dynamos | MUZA | 7th | 2010–11 |

=== CONCACAF ===
| Nation | League | Champion | Second place | Title | Last honour |
|---|---|---|---|---|---|
| Anguilla | 2023 AFA Senior Male League | Doc's United | Roaring Lions | 1st | — |
| Bermuda | 2022–23 Bermudian Premier Division | PHC Zebras | Devonshire Cougars | 12th | 2018–19 |
| Canada | 2023 Canadian Premier League | Forge FC | Cavalry FC | 4th | 2022 |
| Costa Rica | 2023 Liga FPD Clausura | Deportivo Saprissa | Alajuelense | 38th | Apertura 2022 |
| Costa Rica | 2023 Liga FPD Apertura | Deportivo Saprissa | Herediano | 39th | Clausura 2023 |
| Mexico | 2023 Liga MX Clausura | UANL | Guadalajara | 8th | 2019 Clausura |
| Mexico | 2023 Liga MX Apertura | América | UANL | 14th | 2018 Apertura |
| Saint Vincent and the Grenadines | 2022–23 SVGFF Premier Division | Jebelle FC | North Leeward Predators FC | 1st | — |
| / United States & Canada | 2023 Major League Soccer season | Columbus Crew | Los Angeles FC | 3rd | 2020 |
| (United States Virgin Islands) U.S. Virgin Islands | 2022–23 U.S. Virgin Islands Association Club Championship | New Vibes SC | United We Stand SC | 1st | — |

=== CONMEBOL ===
| Nation | League | Champion | Second place | Title | Last honour |
|---|---|---|---|---|---|
| Argentina | 2023 Argentine Primera División | River Plate | Talleres (C) | 38th | 2021 |
| Bolivia | 2023 Bolivian Primera División | The Strongest | Bolívar | 16th | 2016 Apertura |
| Brazil | 2023 Campeonato Brasileiro Série A | Palmeiras | Grêmio | 12th | 2022 |
| Chile | 2023 Chilean Primera División | Huachipato | Cobresal | 3rd | 2012 Clausura |
| Colombia | 2023 Categoría Primera A Apertura | Millonarios | Atlético Nacional | 16th | 2017 Finalización |
| Colombia | 2023 Categoría Primera A Finalización | Junior | Independiente Medellín | 10th | 2019 Apertura |
| Ecuador | 2023 Ecuadorian Serie A | LDU Quito | Independiente del Valle | 12th | 2018 |
| Paraguay | 2023 Paraguayan Primera División Apertura | Libertad | Cerro Porteño | 23rd | 2022 Apertura |
| Paraguay | 2023 Paraguayan Primera División Clausura | Libertad | Cerro Porteño | 24th | 2023 Apertura |
| Peru | 2023 Liga 1 | Universitario | Alianza Lima | 27th | 2013 |
| Uruguay | 2023 Uruguayan Primera División | Liverpool | Peñarol | 1st | — |
| Venezuela | 2023 Venezuelan Primera División | Deportivo Táchira | Caracas | 10th | 2021 |

=== OFC ===
| Nation | League | Champion | Second place | Title | Last honour |
|---|---|---|---|---|---|
| Kiribati | 2023 Kiribati National Championship | Betio Town Council | Tarawa Urban Council | 6th | 2019 |
| New Caledonia | 2022 New Caledonia Super Ligue | AS Magenta | ASC Gaïca | 12th | 2018 |
| New Zealand | 2023 New Zealand National League | Wellington Olympic | Auckland City | 1st | — |
| American Samoa | 2023 FFAS Senior League | Royal Puma | Pago Youth | 1st | — |
| Samoa | 2023 Samoa National League | Vaipuna | Lupe ole Soaga | 1st | — |
| Solomon Islands | 2022–23 Solomon Islands S-League | Solomon Warriors F.C. | Kossa F.C. | 8th | 2021 |
| Tonga | 2023 Tonga Major League | Veitongo | Navutoka | 9th | 2022 |
| Tuvalu | 2023 Tuvalu A-Division | Nauti | Tofaga | 26th | 2022 |

=== Non-FIFA ===
| Nation | League | Champion | Second place | Title | Last honour |
|---|---|---|---|---|---|
| Greenland | 2023 Greenlandic Football Championship | Boldklubben af 1967 | G-44 Qeqertarsuaq | 14th | 2018 |

== Domestic cups ==
=== UEFA ===
| Nation | Tournament | Champion | Final score | Second place | Title | Last honour |
|---|---|---|---|---|---|---|
| Albania | 2022–23 Albanian Cup | Egnatia | 1–0 (a.e.t.) | Tirana | 1st | — |
| Albania | 2023 Albanian Supercup | Partizani | 1–0 | Egnatia | 3rd | 2019 |
| Andorra | 2023 Copa Constitució | Inter Club d'Escaldes | 2–1 | FC Santa Coloma | 2nd | 2020 |
| Armenia | 2022–23 Armenian Cup | Urartu | 2–1 | Shirak | 4th (Note: Urartu's total includes three titles under the earlier name of Banants.) | 2015–16 |
| Austria | 2022–23 Austrian Cup | Sturm Graz | 2–0 | Rapid Wien | 6th | 2017–18 |
| Azerbaijan | 2022–23 Azerbaijan Cup | Gabala | 1–0 (a.e.t.) | Neftçi | 2nd | 2018–19 |
| Belarus | 2022–23 Belarusian Cup | Torpedo-BelAZ Zhodino | 2–0 | BATE Borisov | 2nd | 2015–16 |
| Belarus | 2023 Belarusian Super Cup | Shakhtyor Soligorsk | 1–0 | FC Gomel | 2nd | 2021 |
| Belgium | 2022–23 Belgian Cup | Antwerp | 2–0 | Mechelen | 4th | 2019–20 |
| Belgium | 2023 Belgian Super Cup | Antwerp | 1–1 (5–4 p) | Mechelen | 1st | — |
| Bosnia and Herzegovina | 2022–23 Bosnia and Herzegovina Football Cup | Zrinjski Mostar | 1–0 | Velež Mostar | 2nd | 2007–08 |
| Bulgaria | 2022–23 Bulgarian Cup | Ludogorets Razgrad | 3–1 | CSKA 1948 Sofia | 3rd | 2013–14 |
| Croatia | 2022–23 Croatian Football Cup | Hajduk Split | 2–0 | Šibenik | 8th | 2021–22 |
| Croatia | 2023 Croatian Football Super Cup | Dinamo Zagreb | 1–0 | Hajduk Split | 8th | 2022 |
| Cyprus | 2022–23 Cypriot Cup | Omonia | 1–0 | AEL Limassol | 16th | 2021–22 |
| Czech Republic | 2022–23 Czech Cup | Slavia Prague | 2–0 | Sparta Prague | 7th | 2020–21 |
| Denmark | 2022–23 Danish Cup | Copenhagen | 1–0 | AaB | 9th | 2016–17 |
| England | 2022–23 FA Cup | Manchester City | 2–1 | Manchester United | 7th | 2018–19 |
| England | 2023 FA Community Shield | Arsenal | 1–1 (4–1 p) | Manchester City | 17th | 2020 |
| England | 2022–23 EFL Cup | Manchester United | 2–0 | Newcastle United | 6th | 2016–17 |
| Estonia | 2022–23 Estonian Cup | Narva Trans | 2–1 | Flora | 3rd | 2018–19 |
| Estonia | 2023 Estonian Supercup | Paide Linnameeskond | 3–2 | FC Flora | 1st | — |
| Faroe Islands | 2023 Faroe Islands Super Cup | KÍ Klaksvík | 0–0 (6–5 p) | Víkingur Gøta | 3rd | 2022 |
| Finland | 2023 Finnish League Cup | HJK Helsinki | 2–1 | AC Oulu | 6th | 2015 |
| France | 2022–23 Coupe de France | Toulouse | 5–1 | Nantes | 1st | — |
| France | 2023 Trophée des Champions | Paris Saint-Germain | 2–0 | Toulouse | 12th | 2022 |
| Germany | 2022–23 DFB-Pokal | RB Leipzig | 2–0 | Eintracht Frankfurt | 2nd | 2021–22 |
| Germany | 2023 DFL-Supercup | RB Leipzig | 3–0 | Bayern Munich | 1st | — |
| Gibraltar | 2022–23 Rock Cup | Bruno's Magpies | 1–1 (4–2 p) | Lincoln Red Imps | 1st | — |
| Greece | 2022–23 Greek Football Cup | AEK Athens | 2–0 | PAOK | 16th | 2015–16 |
| Hungary | 2022–23 Magyar Kupa | Zalaegerszeg | 2–0 (a.e.t.) | Budafok | 1st | — |
| Iceland | 2023 Deildabikar | Valur | 1–1 (3–2 p) | KA Akureyri | 4th | 2018 |
| Iceland | 2023 Icelandic Men's Football Super Cup | Breiðablik | 3–2 | Víkingur Reykjavík | 1st | — |
| Israel | 2022–23 Israel State Cup | Beitar Jerusalem | 3–0 | Maccabi Netanya | 8th | 2008–09 |
| Israel | 2023 Israel Super Cup | Maccabi Haifa | 3–1 | Beitar Jerusalem | 5th | 2021 |
| Israel | 2022–23 Toto Cup Al | Maccabi Netanya | 0–0 (5–4 p) | Hapoel Be'er Sheva | 1st | — |
| Italy | 2022–23 Coppa Italia | Inter Milan | 2–1 | Fiorentina | 9th | 2021–22 |
| Italy | 2023 Supercoppa Italiana | Inter Milan | 1–0 | Napoli | 8th | 2022 |
| Kazakhstan | 2023 Kazakhstan Cup | Tobol | 1–0 | Ordabasy | 2nd | 2007 |
| Kazakhstan | 2023 Kazakhstan Super Cup | Astana | 2–1 | Ordabasy | 6th | 2020 |
| Kosovo | 2022–23 Kosovar Cup | Prishtina | 2–0 | Gjilani | 7th | 2019–20 |
| Liechtenstein | 2022–23 Liechtenstein Cup | FC Vaduz | 4–0 | FC Balzers | 49th | 2021–22 |
| Lithuania | 2023 Lithuanian Supercup | FK Žalgiris | 1–1 (3–2 p) | Kauno Žalgiris | 6th | 2020 |
| Luxembourg | 2022–23 Luxembourg Cup | Differdange 03 | 4–2 | Marisca Mersch | 5th | 2014–15 |
| Malta | 2022–23 Maltese FA Trophy | Birkirkara | 2–0 | Marsaxlokk | 6th | 2014–15 |
| Moldova | 2022–23 Moldovan Cup | Sheriff Tiraspol | 0–0 (7–6 p) | FC Bălți | 12th | 2021–22 |
| Montenegro | 2022–23 Montenegrin Cup | Sutjeska | 1–1 (4–3 p) | Arsenal Tivat | 2nd | 2016–17 |
| Netherlands | 2022–23 KNVB Cup | PSV | 1–1 (3–2 p) | Ajax | 11th | 2021–22 |
| Netherlands | 2023 Johan Cruyff Shield | PSV | 1–0 | Feyenoord | 14th | 2022 |
| North Macedonia | 2022–23 Macedonian Football Cup | Makedonija GP | 1–1 (2–0 p) | Struga | 3rd | 2021–22 |
| Northern Ireland | 2022–23 Irish Cup | Crusaders | 4–0 | Ballymena United | 6th | 2021–22 |
| Northern Ireland | 2022–23 Northern Ireland Football League Cup | Linfield | 2–0 | Coleraine | 11th | 2018–19 |
| Norway | 2022–23 Norwegian Football Cup | Brann | 2–0 | Lillestrøm | 7th | 2004 |
| Poland | 2022–23 Polish Cup | Legia Warsaw | 0–0 (6–5 p) | Raków Częstochowa | 20th | 2017–18 |
| Poland | 2023 Polish Super Cup | Legia Warsaw | 0–0 (6–5 p) | Raków Częstochowa | 5th | 2008 |
| Portugal | 2022–23 Taça de Portugal | Porto | 2–0 | Braga | 19th | 2021–22 |
| Portugal | 2023 Supertaça Cândido de Oliveira | Benfica | 2–0 | Porto | 9th | 2019 |
| Portugal | 2022–23 Taça da Liga | Porto | 2–0 | Sporting CP | 1st | — |
| Republic of Ireland | 2023 President of Ireland's Cup | Derry City | 2–0 | Shamrock Rovers | 1st | — |
| Romania | 2022–23 Cupa României | Sepsi Sfântu Gheorghe | 0–0 (5–4 p) | Universitatea Cluj | 2nd | 2021–22 |
| Romania | 2023 Supercupa României | Sepsi Sfântu Gheorghe | 1–0 | Farul Constanța | 2nd | 2022 |
| Russia | 2022–23 Russian Cup | CSKA Moscow | 1–1 (6–5 p) | Krasnodar | 13th | 2012–13 |
| Russia | 2023 Russian Super Cup | Zenit Saint Petersburg | 1–1 (5–4 p) | CSKA Moscow | 8th | 2022 |
| San Marino | 2022–23 Coppa Titano | Virtus | 3–1 | Tre Penne | 1st | — |
| Scotland | 2022–23 Scottish Cup | Celtic | 3–1 | Inverness Caledonian Thistle | 41st | 2019–20 |
| Scotland | 2022–23 Scottish League Cup | Celtic | 2–1 | Rangers | 21st | 2021–22 |
| Serbia | 2022–23 Serbian Cup | Red Star Belgrade | 2–1 | Čukarički | 6th | 2021–22 |
| Slovakia | 2022–23 Slovak Cup | Spartak Trnava | 3–1 (a.e.t.) | Slovan Bratislava | 8th | 2021–22 |
| Slovenia | 2022–23 Slovenian Football Cup | Olimpija Ljubljana | 2–1 (a.e.t.) | Maribor | 4th | 2020–21 |
| Spain | 2022–23 Copa del Rey | Real Madrid | 2–1 | Osasuna | 20th | 2013–14 |
| Spain | 2023 Supercopa de España | Barcelona | 3–1 | Real Madrid | 14th | 2018 |
| Sweden | 2022–23 Svenska Cupen | BK Häcken | 4–1 | Mjällby AIF | 3rd | 2018–19 |
| Switzerland | 2022–23 Swiss Cup | Young Boys | 3–2 | Lugano | 8th | 2019–20 |
| Turkey | 2022–23 Turkish Cup | Fenerbahçe | 2–0 | İstanbul Başakşehir | 7th | 2012–13 |
| Ukraine | 2022–23 Ukrainian Cup | No competition due to war | | | | |
| Wales | 2022–23 Welsh Cup | The New Saints | 6–0 | Bala Town | 9th | 2021–22 |
| Wales | 2022–23 Welsh League Cup | Bala Town | 0–0 (4–3 p) | Connah's Quay | 1st | — |

=== AFC ===
| Nation | Tournament | Champion | Final score | Second place | Title | Last honour |
|---|---|---|---|---|---|---|
| Australia | 2023 Australia Cup | Sydney | 2–1 | Brisbane Roar | 2nd | 2017 |
| Bahrain | 2022–23 Bahraini FA Cup | Manama Club | 2–2 (a.e.t.) (5–4 p) | Al-Khaldiya SC | 1st | — |
| Bahrain | 2022–23 Bahraini King's Cup | Al Hala SC | 0–0 (a.e.t.) (6–5 p) | Al-Ahli Club | 4th | 1981 |
| Bangladesh | 2022–23 Federation Cup | Mohammedan SC | 4-4 (a.e.t.) (4–2 p) | Abahani Limited | 11th | 2009 |
| Bangladesh | 2022–23 Independence Cup | Bashundhara Kings | 2-2 (a.e.t.) (1-4 p) | Sheikh Russel KC | 2nd | 2019 |
| Cambodia | 2023 CNCC League Cup | Phnom Penh Crown | 1–1 (a.e.t.) (3–2 p) | Nagaworld | 2nd | 2022 |
| China | 2023 Chinese FA Cup | Shanghai Shenhua | 1–0 | Shandong Taishan | 4th | 2019 |
| China | 2023 Chinese FA Super Cup | Wuhan Three Towns | 2–0 | Shandong Taishan | 1st | – |
| Hong Kong | 2022–23 Hong Kong Senior Challenge Shield | Kitchee | 1–1 (a.e.t.) (4–2 p) | Eastern AA | 7th | 2018–19 |
| Hong Kong | 2022–23 Hong Kong Sapling Cup | Southern District | 2–0 | Lee Man | 1st | — |
| India | 2023 Indian Super Cup | Odisha | 3–2 | Bengaluru | 1st | — |
| India | 2022–23 Santosh Trophy | Karnataka | 3–2 | Meghalaya | 5th | 1968–69 |
| India | 2023 Durund Cup | Mohan Bagan | 1-0 | East Bengal | 17th | |
| Iraq | 2022–23 Iraq FA Cup | Al-Quwa Al-Jawiya | 1–0 | Erbil | 6th | 2020–21 |
| Japan | 2023 Emperor's Cup | | | | | |
| Japan | 2023 J.League Cup | Avispa Fukuoka | 2–1 | Urawa Red | 1st | – |
| Japan | 2023 Japanese Super Cup | Yokohama F. Marinos | 2–1 | Ventforet Kofu | 1st | — |
| Kuwait | 2022–23 Kuwait Emir Cup | Kuwait SC | 3–0 | Kazma SC | 16th | 2020-21 |
| Kuwait | 2022–23 Kuwait Crown Prince Cup | Al-Arabi SC | 2–2 (a.e.t.) (4–1 p) | Al-Salmiya SC | 9th | 2021-22 |
| Kuwait | 2022–23 Kuwait Federation Cup | Qadsia SC | 2–2 (a.e.t.) (4–3 p) | Al-Salmiya SC | 6th | 2018–19 |
| Kyrgyzstan | 2023 Kyrgyzstan Super Cup | FC Alay | 1–0 | Abdysh-Ata Kant | 2nd | 2018 |
| Lebanon | 2022–23 Lebanese FA Cup | Nejmeh SC | 0–0 (4–3 p) | Al Ahed | 8th | 2021–22 |
| Malaysia | 2023 Malaysia Cup | Johor Darul Ta'zim F.C. | 3–1 | Terengganu FC | 4th | 2022 |
| Malaysia | 2023 Malaysia FA Cup | Johor Darul Ta'zim | 2–0 | Kuala Lumpur City F.C. | 3rd | 2022 |
| Oman | 2022–23 Sultan Qaboos Cup | Al-Nahda Club | 1–0 | Al-Seeb Club | 1st | — |
| Philippines | 2023 Copa Paulino Alcantara | Kaya–Iloilo | 1–1 (a.e.t.) (4–3 p) | Davao Aguilas | 3rd | 2022 |
| Qatar | 2023 Emir of Qatar Cup | Al-Arabi SC | 3–0 | Al Sadd SC | 9th | 1992–93 |
| Qatar | 2022–23 Qatari Stars Cup | Al-Duhail | 1–0 | Umm Salal | 1st | — |
| Saudi Arabia | 2022–23 King Cup | Al-Hilal | 1–1 (a.e.t.) (7–6 p) | Al-Wehda | 10th | 2020 |
| Saudi Arabia | 2022–23 Saudi Super Cup | Al-Ittihad | 2–0 | Al-Fayha | 1st | — |
| Singapore | 2023 Singapore Cup | Lion City Sailors | 3-1 | Hougang United | 7th | 2013 |
| Singapore | 2023 Singapore Community Shield | Albirex Niigata (S) | 3–0 | Hougang United | 4th | 2018 |
| South Korea | 2023 Korean FA Cup | Pohang Steelers | 4–2 | Jeonbuk Hyundai Motors | 5th | 2013 |
| Tajikistan | 2023 Tajik Super Cup | Ravshan Kulob | 1–0 | FC Istiklol | 2nd | 2013 |
| Thailand | 2022–23 Thai FA Cup | Buriram United | 2–0 | Bangkok United | 6th | 2021–22 |
| Thailand | 2022–23 Thai League Cup | Buriram United | 2–0 | BG Pathum United | 7th | 2021–22 |
| United Arab Emirates | 2022–23 UAE President's Cup | Sharjah | 1–1 (14–13 p) | Al Ain | 10th | 2021–22 |
| United Arab Emirates | 2022–23 UAE League Cup | Sharjah | 2–1 | Al Ain | 1st | — |
| Vietnam | 2023 Vietnamese Cup | | | | | |
| Vietnam | 2022–23 Vietnamese National Football Super Cup | Hanoi FC | 2–0 | Haiphong | 5th | 2020 |

=== CAF ===
| Nation | Tournament | Champion | Final score | Second place | Title | Last honour |
|---|---|---|---|---|---|---|
| Algeria | 2022–23 Algerian Cup | ASO Chlef | 2–1 (a.e.t.) | CR Belouizdad | 2nd | 2004–05 |
| Burkina Faso | 2023 Coupe du Faso | Étoile Filante | 3–0 | Salitas | 22nd | 2017 |
| Burundi | 2023 Coupe du Président de la République | Aigle Noir | 3–1 | Bumamuru | 2nd | 2019 |
| Egypt | 2022–23 Egyptian Super Cup | Al Ahly | 1–0 (a.e.t.) | Pyramids | 13th | 2021–22 |
| Ghana | 2023 Ghana Cup | Dreams FC | 2–0 | King Faisal Babes | 1st | — |
| Kenya | 2023 Kenya Super Cup | Gor Mahia | 1–1 (4–2 p) | Kakamega Homeboyz | 7th | 2020 |
| Mali | 2023 Malian Cup | Stade Malien | 1–0 | Onze Créateurs | 21st | 2021 |
| Nigeria | 2023 Nigeria Federation Cup | Bendel Insurance | 1–0 | Enugu Rangers | 4th | 1980 |
| Rwanda | 2023 Rwanda Super Cup | Rayon Sports | 3–0 | APR | 2nd | 2017 |
| São Tomé and Príncipe | 2023 São Tomé and Príncipe Super Cup | GD Operários | 4–0 | Trindade FC | 1st | — |
| South Africa | 2022-23 Nedbank Cup | Orlando Pirates | 2–1 | Sekhukhune United | 9th | 2013-14 |
| Tunisia | 2022–23 Tunisian Cup | Olympique Béja | 1–0 | Espérance de Tunis | 3rd | 2009–10 |
| Uganda | 2023 Uganda Cup | Vipers | 1–0 | Police | 2nd | 2021 |
| Zambia | 2022–23 Zambia Cup | Forest Rangers | 2–0 | MUZA | 2nd | 2005 |

=== CONCACAF ===
| Nation | Tournament | Champion | Final score | Second place | Title | Last honour |
|---|---|---|---|---|---|---|
| Canada | 2023 Canadian Championship | Vancouver Whitecaps FC | 2–1 | CF Montréal | 3rd | 2022 |
| Jamaica | 2022–23 JFF Champions Cup | Portmore United | 2–0 | Cavalier | 5th | 2007 |
| United States | 2023 U.S. Open Cup | Houston Dynamo | 2–1 | Inter Miami CF | 2nd | 2018 |

=== CONMEBOL ===
| Nation | Tournament | Champion | Final score | Second place | Title | Last honour |
|---|---|---|---|---|---|---|
| Argentina | 2023 Copa Argentina | Estudiantes (LP) | 1–0 | Defensa y Justicia | 1st | — |
| Argentina | 2023 Copa de la Liga Profesional | Rosario Central | 1–0 | Platense | 1st | — |
| Argentina | 2023 Trofeo de Campeones de la Liga Profesional | River Plate | 2–0 | Rosario Central | 2nd | 2021 |
| Bolivia | 2023 Copa de la División Profesional | Bolívar | 3–1 | Jorge Wilstermann | 1st | — |
| Brazil | 2023 Copa do Brasil | São Paulo | 2–1 | Flamengo | 1st | — |
| Brazil | 2023 Supercopa do Brasil | Palmeiras | 4–3 | Flamengo | 1st | — |
| Brazil | 2023 Copa do Nordeste | Ceará | 2–2 (4–2 p) | Sport Recife | 3rd | 2020 |
| Brazil | 2023 Copa Verde | Goiás | 4–1 | Paysandu | 1st | — |
| Chile | 2023 Copa Chile | Colo-Colo | 3–1 | Magallanes | 14th | 2021 |
| Chile | 2023 Supercopa de Chile | Magallanes | 1–1 (4–3 p) | Colo-Colo | 1st | — |
| Colombia | 2023 Copa Colombia | Atlético Nacional | 2–2 (5–4 p) | Millonarios | 6th | 2021 |
| Colombia | 2023 Superliga Colombiana | Atlético Nacional | 5–3 | Deportivo Pereira | 3rd | 2016 |
| Ecuador | 2023 Supercopa Ecuador | Independiente del Valle | 3–0 | Aucas | 1st | — |
| Paraguay | 2023 Copa Paraguay | Libertad | 1–1 (4–1 p) | Sportivo Trinidense | 2nd | 2019 |
| Uruguay | 2023 Copa Uruguay | Defensor Sporting | 2–2 (4–2 p) | Montevideo City Torque | 2nd | 2022 |
| Uruguay | 2023 Supercopa Uruguaya | Liverpool | 1–0 | Nacional | 2nd | 2020 |

=== OFC ===
| Nation | Tournament | Champion | Final score | Second place | Title | Last honour |
|---|---|---|---|---|---|---|
| Fiji | 2023 Champion versus Champion | Lautoka | 2–1 (a.e.t.) | Rewa | 1st | — |
| Fiji | 2023 Fiji FACT Cup | Suva | 2–1 | Rewa | 1st | — |
| Fiji | 2023 Battle of the Giants | | | | | |
| New Zealand | 2023 Chatham Cup | Christchurch United | 2–2 (4–2 p) | Melville United | 7th | 1991 |

=== Non FIFA ===
| Nation | Tournament | Champion | Final score | Second place | Title | Last honour |
|---|---|---|---|---|---|---|
| Gozo | 2022–23 G.F.A. Cup | | | | | |
| Gozo | 2022–23 First Division Knock-Out Cup | Nadur Youngsters | 2–1 | Qala Saints | 3rd | 2021–22 |
| Gozo | 2022–23 Second Division Knock-Out Cup | Xagħra United | 1–0 | Żebbuġ Rovers | 4th | ? |
| Gozo | 2022–23 Second Division Challenge Cup | Victoria Wanderers FC | 1–0 | Xagħra United | 3rd | ? |
| Monaco | 2022–23 Challenge Prince Rainier III | M.I. Monaco S.A.M. | 3–2 | Vinci Construction Monaco | 2nd | 2018–19 |

== Women's leagues ==
=== UEFA ===
| Nation | League | Champion | Second place | Title | Last honour |
|---|---|---|---|---|---|
| Albania | 2022–23 Albanian Women's National Championship | Vllaznia | Tirana | 10th | 2021–22 |
| Armenia | 2022–23 Armenian Women's Premier League | Hayasa | Lernayin Artsakh | 3rd | 2021–22 |
| Austria | 2022–23 ÖFB-Frauenliga | St. Pölten | Sturm Graz | 8th | 2021–22 |
| Azerbaijan | 2022–23 Azerbaijan Women's Premier League | Sumgayit | | | |
| Belarus | 2023 Belarusian Premier League | | | | |
| Belgium | 2022–23 Belgian Women's Super League | Anderlecht | Oud-Heverlee Leuven | 10th | 2021–22 |
| Bosnia and Herzegovina | 2022–23 Bosnia and Herzegovina Women's Premier League | SFK 2000 | Emina Mostar | 21st | 2021–22 |
| Bulgaria | 2022–23 Bulgarian Women's League | Lokomotiv Stara Zagora | | 3rd | 2021–22 |
| Croatia | 2022–23 Croatian Women's First Football League | Osijek | Split | 24th | 2020–21 |
| Cyprus | 2022–23 Cypriot First Division | Apollon Ladies | | 13th | 2021–22 |
| Czech Republic | 2022–23 Czech Women's First League | Slavia Prague | Sparta Prague | 9th | 2021–22 |
| Denmark | 2022–23 Danish Women's League | Køge | Brøndby | 3rd | 2021–22 |
| England | 2022–23 Women's Super League | Chelsea | Manchester United | 6th | 2021–22 |
| Estonia | 2023 Naiste Meistriliiga | | | | |
| Faroe Islands | 2023 1. deild kvinnur | | | | |
| Finland | 2023 Kansallinen Liiga | | | | |
| France | 2022–23 Division 1 Féminine | Lyon | Paris Saint-Germain | 16th | 2021–22 |
| (Georgia (country)) Georgia | 2023 Georgia women's football championship | | | | |
| Germany | 2022–23 Frauen-Bundesliga | Bayern Munich | VfL Wolfsburg | 5th | 2020–21 |
| Gibraltar | 2022–23 Gibraltar Women's Football League | Lions Gibraltar | Europa | 5th | 2021–22 |
| Greece | 2022–23 Greek A Division | PAOK | | 18th | 2021–22 |
| Hungary | 2022–23 Női NB I | Ferencváros | ETO Győr | 6th | 2021–22 |
| Iceland | 2023 Úrvalsdeild kvenna | | | | |
| Israel | 2022–23 Ligat Nashim | Kiryat Gat | Hapoel Jerusalem | 5th | 2021–22 |
| Italy | 2022–23 Serie A | AS Roma | Juventus | 1st | — |
| Kazakhstan | 2023 Kazakhstani women's football championship | | | | |
| Kosovo | 2022–23 Women's Football Superleague of Kosovo | EP-COM Hajvalia | | 2nd | 2021–22 |
| Latvia | 2023 Latvian Women's League | | | | |
| Lithuania | 2023 Lithuanian Women's A League | | | | |
| Luxembourg | 2022–23 Dames Ligue 1 | Racing Union | | | |
| Malta | 2022–23 Maltese Women's League | Birkirkara | | 11th | 2021–22 |
| Moldova | 2022–23 Moldovan Women Top League | Agarista Anenii Noi | Noroc Nimoreni | 5th | 2020–21 |
| Montenegro | 2022–23 Montenegrin Women's League | Breznica | | 8th | 2021–22 |
| Netherlands | 2022–23 Eredivisie | Ajax | Twente | 3rd | 2017–18 |
| North Macedonia | 2022–23 Macedonian Women's Football Championship | Ljuboten | | 2nd | 2021–22 |
| Northern Ireland | 2023 Women's Premiership | | | | |
| Norway | 2023 Toppserien | | | | |
| Poland | 2022–23 Ekstraliga Kobiet | Katowice | Górnik Łęczna | 1st | — |
| Portugal | 2022–23 Campeonato Nacional Feminino | Benfica | Sporting CP | 3rd | 2021–22 |
| Republic of Ireland | 2023 Women's National League | | | | |
| Romania | 2022–23 Liga I | U Olimpia Cluj | Politehnica Timișoara | 12th | 2021–22 |
| Russia | 2023 Russian Women's Football Super League | | | | |
| Scotland | 2022–23 Scottish Women's Premier League | Glasgow City | Celtic | 16th | 2020–21 |
| Serbia | 2022–23 Serbian Women's Super League | Spartak Subotica | | 14th | 2021–22 |
| Slovakia | 2022–23 Slovak Women's First League | Spartak Myjava | Slovan Bratislava | 2nd | 2021–22 |
| Slovenia | 2022–23 Slovenian Women's League | Mura | Olimpija Ljubljana | 10th (Note: Mura's total includes nine titles under the earlier name of Pomurje.) | 2021–22 |
| Spain | 2022–23 Liga F | Barcelona | Real Madrid | 8th | 2021–22 |
| Sweden | 2023 Damallsvenskan | | | | |
| Switzerland | 2022–23 Swiss Women's Super League | Zürich | Servette | 24th | 2021–22 |
| Turkey | 2022–23 Turkish Women's Football Super League | Ankara BB Fomget | Fenerbahçe | 1st | — |
| Ukraine | 2022–23 Ukrainian Women's League | Vorskla Poltava | Kryvbas Kryvyi Rih | 4th (Note: Vorskla Poltava's total includes three titles under the earlier name of Zhytlobud-2 Kharkiv.) | 2019–20 |
| Wales | 2022–23 Adran Premier | Cardiff City | Swansea City | 2nd | 2012–13 |

=== AFC ===
| Nation | League | Champion | Second place | Title | Last honour |
|---|---|---|---|---|---|
| Australia | 2022–23 A-League Women | Sydney FC (Note: In A-League Women (as well as its male counterpart of A-League Men), the term "champions" refers to the winner of the playoff tournament (known in Australian English as the "finals series") that follows the league season. The team that tops the league table is designated "premiers".) | Western United | 4th (Note: Reflects only wins in the Grand Final, the last match of the A-League Women finals series.) | 2018–19 |
| Bhutan | 2022–23 Bhutan Women's National League | Paro | RTC | 1st | —N/a |
| India | 2022–23 Indian Women's League | Gokulam Kerala | Kickstart | 3rd | |
| Japan | 2022–23 WE League | Urawa Red Diamonds | INAC Kobe Leonessa | 1st | —N/a |
| Philippines | 2023 PFF Women's League | Kaya–Iloilo | Manila Digger | 1st | —N/a |
| Saudi Arabia | 2022–23 Saudi Women's Premier League | Al-Nassr | Al-Hilal | 1st | —N/a |
| Singapore | 2023 Women's Premier League | Lion City Sailors | Albirex Niigata (S) | 2nd | 2022 |

=== CONCACAF ===
| Nation | League | Champion | Second place | Title | Last honour |
|---|---|---|---|---|---|
| Mexico | 2023 Liga MX Femenil Clausura | América | Pachuca | 2nd | 2018 Apertura |
| Mexico | 2023 Liga MX Femenil Apertura | UANL | América | 6th | 2022 Apertura |
| United States | 2023 NWSL season | NJ/NY Gotham FC | OL Reign (Note: Reverted to its original name of Seattle Reign FC after the 2023 season.) | 1st (Note: Includes only NWSL titles. Gotham FC won one title in the defunct Women's Professional Soccer league under its former name of Sky Blue FC.) | — |

=== CONMEBOL ===
| Nation | League | Champion | Second place | Title | Last honour |
|---|---|---|---|---|---|
| Argentina | 2023 Campeonato de Fútbol Femenino Apertura | | | | |
| Argentina | 2023 Campeonato de Fútbol Femenino Clausura | | | | |
| Bolivia | 2023 Copa Simón Bolívar Femenina | | | | |
| Brazil | 2023 Campeonato Brasileiro de Futebol Feminino Série A1 | Corinthians | Ferroviária | 5th | 2022 |
| Chile | 2023 Chilean women's football championship | | | | |
| Colombia | 2023 Liga Femenina Profesional | Santa Fe | América de Cali | 3rd | 2020 |
| Ecuador | 2023 SuperLiga Femenina | | | | |
| Paraguay | 2023 Paraguayan women's football championship | | | | |
| Peru | 2023 Liga Femenina | Universitario | Alianza Lima | 10th | 2019 |
| Uruguay | 2023 Women's Uruguayan Championship | | | | |
| Venezuela | 2023 Liga FUTVE Fem | | | | |

=== CAF ===
| Nation | League | Champion | Second place | Title | Last honour |
|---|---|---|---|---|---|
| Algeria | 2022–23 Algerian Women's Championship | Afak Relizane | JF Khroub | 11th | 2021–22 |
| Ivory Coast | 2022–23 Ivory Coast Women's Championship | Atlético d'Abidjan | Juventus | 1st | 2021–22 |
| Egypt | 2022–23 Egyptian Women's Premier League | Wadi Degla | Markaz Shabab | 13th | 2021–22 |
| Madagascar | 2022–23 Malagasy Women's football National Championship | Disciples FF | ASCUF | | |
| Morocco | 2022–23 Moroccan Women's Championship | AS FAR | SC Casablanca | 10th | 2021–22 |
| Nigeria | 2022–23 NWFL Premiership | Delta Queens | Bayelsa Queens | 6th | 2012 |
| South Africa | 2023 SAFA Women's League | Mamelodi Sundowns Ladies | University of the Western Cape | 6th | 2022 |
| Uganda | 2022–23 FUFA Women Super League | Kampala Queens | Kawempe Muslims | 1st | — |

=== OFC ===
| Nation | League | Champion | Second place | Title | Last honour |
|---|---|---|---|---|---|
| New Zealand | 2023 Women's National League | Auckland United | Southern United | 1st | — |

== Women's domestic cups ==
=== UEFA ===
| Nation | Tournament | Champion | Final score | Second place | Title | Last honour |
|---|---|---|---|---|---|---|
| Austria | 2022–23 ÖFB Ladies Cup | SKN St. Pölten | 3–1 | SPG SCR Altach/FFC Vorderland | 9th | 2021–22 |
| Belarus | 2023 Belarusian Women's Super Cup | Dinamo-BGUFK | 1–1 (4–2 p) | ZFK Minsk | 2nd | 2020 |
| Belgium | 2022–23 Belgian Women's Cup | Standard Liège | 3–0 (a.e.t.) | Genk | 9th | 2017–18 |
| Czech Republic | 2022–23 Czech Women's Cup | Slavia Prague | 1–1 (4–2 p) | Sparta Prague | 4th | 2021–22 |
| England | 2022–23 Women's FA Cup | Chelsea | 1–0 | Manchester United | 5th | 2021–22 |
| England | 2022–23 FA Women's League Cup | Arsenal | 3–1 | Chelsea | 6th | 2017–18 |
| Estonia | 2023 Estonian Women's Cup | Saku Sporting | 1–0 | Tartu JK Tammeka | 1st | — |
| Estonia | 2023 Estonian Women's Supercup | FC Flora | 4–2 | Saku Sporting | 7th | 2022 |
| Faroe Islands | 2023 Faroese Women's Super Cup | KÍ Klaksvík | 2–0 | NSÍ Runavík | 1st | — |
| France | 2022–23 Coupe de France féminine | Lyon | 2–1 | Paris Saint-Germain | 10th | 2019–20 |
| Germany | 2022–23 DFB-Pokal Frauen | VfL Wolfsburg | 4–1 | SC Freiburg | 10th | 2021–22 |
| Hungary | 2022–23 Hungarian Women's Cup | ETO Győr | 4–1 | Puskás Akadémia | 2nd | 2021–22 |
| Iceland | 2023 Icelandic Women's Football Super Cup | Stjarnan | 0–0 (4–3 p) | Valur | 3rd | 2015 |
| Iceland | 2023 Icelandic Women's Football League Cup | Stjarnan | 2–2 (5–4 p) | Þór/KA | 4th | 2015 |
| Israel | 2022–23 Israeli Women's Cup | Ramat HaSharon | 2–1 (a.e.t.) | ASA Tel Aviv University | 2nd | 2017–18 |
| Italy | 2022–23 Coppa Italia | Juventus | 1–0 | Roma | 3rd | 2021–22 |
| Kazakhstan | 2023 Kazakhstani Women's Cup | BIIK Shymkent | Group stage | FC Tomiris-Turan | 13th | 2022 |
| Kosovo | 2023 Kosovo Women's Football Cup | KFF Mitrovica | 2–1 | KFF Hajvalia | 7th | 2021–22 |
| Moldova | 2022–23 Moldovan Women's Cup | Agarista Anenii Noi | 4–0 | Noroc Nimoreni | 5th | 2021–22 |
| Netherlands | 2022–23 KNVB Women's Cup | FC Twente | 4–0 | PSV | 3rd | 2014–15 |
| North Macedonia | 2022–23 Macedonian Women's Football Cup | Ljuboten | 4–0 | ŽFK Kamenica Sasa | 1st | – |
| Poland | 2022–23 Polish Women's Cup | UKS SMS Łódź | 5–0 | APLG Gdansk | 1st | – |
| Portugal | 2022–23 Taça de Portugal Feminina | Famalicão | 2–0 | Braga | 1st | – |
| Portugal | 2023 Taça da Liga Feminina | Benfica | 3–1 | Braga | 3rd | 2021 |
| Romania | 2022–23 Cupa României | Carmen București | 2–1 (a.e.t.) | U Olimpia Cluj | 1st | – |
| Scotland | 2022–23 Scottish Women's Cup | Celtic | 2–0 | Rangers | 2nd | 2021–22 |
| Scotland | 2022–23 Scottish Women's Premier League Cup | Rangers | 2–0 | Hibernian | 2nd | – |
| Serbia | 2023 Serbian Women's Cup | Spartak Subotica | 2–0 | Crvena Zvezda | 10th | 2022 |
| Slovakia | 2023 Slovak Women's Cup | Spartak Myjava | 3–0 | Spartak Trnava | 1st | – |
| Slovenia | 2022–23 Slovenian Women's Cup | Mura | 3–1 | Olimpija Ljubljana | 1st | – |
| Spain | 2022–23 Copa de la Reina de Fútbol | Atlético de Madrid | 2–2 (3–1 p) | Real Madrid | 2nd | 2016 |
| Spain | 2022–23 Supercopa de España Femenina | Barcelona | 3–0 | Real Sociedad | 3rd | 2021–22 |
| Sweden | 2022–23 Svenska Cupen | Hammarby | 3–0 | BK Häcken | 3rd | 1995 |
| Switzerland | 2022–23 Swiss Women's Cup | Servette FC | 1–0 | FC St. Gallen | 1st | – |

=== AFC ===
| Nation | Tournament | Champion | Final score | Second place | Title | Last honour |
|---|---|---|---|---|---|---|
| Japan | 2022–23 Empress's Cup | NTV Beleza | 4–0 | INAC Kobe Leonessa | 16th | 2020 |
| Japan | 2023–24 WE League Cup (Note: Though held during the 2023–24 league season and billed as a 2023–24 competition, the WE League Cup took place entirely within calendar 2023.) | Sanfrecce Hiroshima Regina | 0–0 (4–2 p) | Albirex Niigata Ladies | 1st | — |
| Vietnam | 2022-23 Vietnamese Women's Cup | TKS Việt Nam | 2–2 (5–4 p) | Hà Nội I | 1st | — |

=== CAF ===
| Nation | Tournament | Champion | Final score | Second place | Title | Last honour |
|---|---|---|---|---|---|---|
| Algeria | 2022–23 Algerian Women's Cup | JF Khroub | 0–0 (4–3 p) | CS Constantine | 1st | – |

=== CONCACAF ===
| Nation | Tournament | Champion | Final score | Second place | Title | Last honour |
|---|---|---|---|---|---|---|
| United States | 2023 NWSL Challenge Cup | North Carolina Courage | 2–0 | Racing Louisville FC | 2nd | 2022 |

=== CONMEBOL ===
| Nation | Tournament | Champion | Final Score | Second place | Title | Last honour |
|---|---|---|---|---|---|---|
| Brazil | 2023 Supercopa do Brasil de Futebol Feminino | Corinthians | 4–1 | Flamengo | 2nd | 2022 |

=== OFC ===
| Nation | Tournament | Champion | Final score | Second place | Title | Last honour |
|---|---|---|---|---|---|---|
| New Zealand | 2023 Kate Sheppard Cup | Western Springs | 2–1 | Wellington United | 2nd | 2007 |

== Second, third, fourth, and fifth leagues ==
=== UEFA ===
| Nation | League | Champion | Second place | Title | Last honour |
|---|---|---|---|---|---|
| Albania | 2022–23 Kategoria e Parë | Skënderbeu Korçë | Dinamo Tirana | 4th | 2006–07 |
| Albania | 2022–23 Kategoria e Dytë | Vora | Elbasani | 3rd | 2019–20 |
| Albania | 2022–23 Kategoria e Tretë | Adriatiku | Albanët | 1st | — |
| Andorra | 2022–23 Segona Divisió | Pas de la Casa | Atlètic Amèrica | 1st | — |
| Armenia | 2022–23 Armenian First League | West Armenia | BKMA II | 1st | — |
| Azerbaijan | 2022–23 Azerbaijan First Division | Araz-Naxçıvan | Neftchi Baku II | 2nd | 2013–14 |
| Azerbaijan | 2022–23 Azerbaijan Regional League | | | | |
| Azerbaijan | 2022–23 AFFA Amateur League | | | | |
| Austria | 2022–23 Austrian Football Second League | Blau-Weiß Linz | Grazer AK | 2nd | 2020–21 |
| Austria | 2022–23 Austrian Regionalliga | | | | |
| Austria | 2022–23 Austrian Landesliga | | | | |
| Austria | 2022–23 Austrian 2. Landesliga | | | | |
| Belarus | 2023 Belarusian First League | | | | |
| Belarus | 2023 Belarusian Second League | | | | |
| Belgium | 2022–23 Challenger Pro League | RWDM | Beveren | 1st | — |
| Belgium | 2022–23 Belgian National Division 1 | | | | |
| Belgium | 2022–23 Belgian Division 2 | (VVA) Lokeren-Temse | | | |
| Belgium | 2022–23 Belgian Division 2 | (VVB) | | | |
| Belgium | 2022–23 Belgian Division 2 | (ACFF) Warnant | Union Namur | 1st | — |
| Belgium | 2022–23 Belgian Division 3 | (VVA) Tempo Overijse | Voorde-Appelterre | 1st | — |
| Belgium | 2022–23 Belgian Division 3 | (VVB) Wezel | Houtvenne | 1st | — |
| Belgium | 2022–23 Belgian Division 3 | (ACFF A) Mons | Tournai | 1st | — |
| Belgium | 2022–23 Belgian Division 3 | (ACFF B) Union Rochefortoise | | 1st | — |
| England | 2022–23 EFL Championship | Burnley | Sheffield United | 4th | 2015–16 |
| England | 2022–23 EFL League One | Plymouth Argyle | Ipswich Town | 5th | 2003–04 |
| England | 2022–23 EFL League Two | Leyton Orient | Stevenage | 1st | — |
| England | 2022–23 National League | (The National League) Wrexham | Notts County | 1st | — |
| England | 2022–23 National League | (National League North) AFC Fylde | King's Lynn Town | 2nd | 2016–17 |
| England | 2022–23 National League | (National League South) Ebbsfleet United | Dartford | 1st | – |
| England | 2022–23 Northern Premier League | (Premier Division) South Shields | Warrington Town | 1st | – |
| England | 2022–23 Northern Premier League | (Division One West) Macclesfield | Workington AFC | 1st | – |
| England | 2022–23 Northern Premier League | (Division One East) Worksop Town | Long Eaton United | 1st | – |
| England | 2022–23 Northern Premier League | (Division One Midlands) Stamford AFC | Halesowen Town | 1st | – |
| England | 2022–23 Southern Football League | (Premier Division Central) Tamworth | Coalville Town | 1st | – |
| England | 2022–23 Southern Football League | (Premier Division South) Weston-super-Mare | Bracknell Town | 1st | – |
| England | 2022–23 Southern Football League | (Division One Central) Berkhamsted | Biggleswade | 1st | – |
| England | 2022–23 Southern Football League | (Division One South) AFC Totton | Sholing | 2nd | 2010–11 |
| England | 2022–23 Isthmian League | (Premier Division) Bishop's Stortford | Hornchurch | 1st | – |
| England | 2022–23 Isthmian League | (North Division) Hashtag United | AFC Sudbury | 1st | – |
| England | 2022–23 Isthmian League | (South Central Division) Basingstoke Town | Walton & Hersham | 1st | – |
| England | 2022–23 Isthmian League | (South East Division) Chatham Town | Whitehawk | 1st | – |
| England | 2022–23 Combined Counties Football League | (Premier Division North) Ascot United | Egham Town | 1st | – |
| England | 2022–23 Combined Counties Football League | (Premier Division South) Raynes Park Vale | Badshot Lea | 1st | – |
| England | 2022–23 Combined Counties Football League | (Division One) Sandhurst Town | Berks County | 1st | – |
| England | 2022–23 Eastern Counties Football League | (Premier Division) Ipswich Wanderers | Thetford Town | 1st | – |
| England | 2022–23 Eastern Counties Football League | (Division One North) Heacham | Downham Town | 1st | – |
| England | 2022–23 Eastern Counties Football League | (Division One South) Frenford | Basildon Town | 1st | – |
| Germany | 2022–23 2. Bundesliga | 1. FC Heidenheim | SV Darmstadt 98 | 1st | – |
| Germany | 2022–23 3. Liga | SV Elversberg | SC Freiburg II | 1st | – |
| Germany | 2022–23 Regionalliga | (Bayern) SpVgg Unterhaching | Würzburger Kickers | 2nd | 2016–17 |
| Germany | 2022–23 Regionalliga | (North) VfB Lübeck | Hamburger SV II | 3rd | 2001–02 |
| Germany | 2022–23 Regionalliga | (Nordost) Energie Cottbus | Carl Zeiss Jena | 3rd | 2017–18 |
| Germany | 2022–23 Regionalliga | (Southwest) SSV Ulm | TSV Steinbach Haiger | 1st | – |
| Germany | 2022–23 Regionalliga | (West) Preußen Münster | Wuppertaler SV | 2nd | 2010–11 |
| Germany | 2022–23 Oberliga | (Baden-Württemberg) Stuttgarter Kickers | Sonnenhof Großaspach | 1st | — |
| Germany | 2022–23 Oberliga | (Bayernliga North) Eintracht Bamburg | DJK Gebenbach | 1st | – |
| Germany | 2022–23 Oberliga | (Bayernliga South) SV Schalding-Heining | Memmingen | 2nd | 2012–13 |
| Germany | 2022–23 Oberliga | (Bremenliga) FC Oberneuland | Hemelingen | 5th | 2019–20 |
| Germany | 2022–23 Oberliga | (Hamburg) TSV Sasel | TuS Dassendorf | 1st | — |
| Germany | 2022–23 Oberliga | (Hessenliga) Eintracht Frankfurt II | Gießen | 3rd | 2001–02 |
| Germany | 2022–23 Oberliga | (Mittelrheinliga) Hennef 05 | Wegberg-Beeck | 3rd | 2013–14 |
| Germany | 2022–23 Oberliga | (Niederrhein) SSVg Velbert | VfB 03 Hilden | 2nd | 2014–15 |
| Germany | 2022–23 Oberliga | (Niedersachsen) Spelle-Venhaus | Lupo Martini Wolfsburg | 1st | – |
| Germany | 2022–23 Oberliga | (Northeast North) Hansa Rostock II | Rostocker FC | 1st | – |
| Germany | 2022–23 Oberliga | (Northeast South) Eilenburg | VfB Krieschow | 1st | – |
| Germany | 2022–23 Oberliga | (Rheinland-Pfalz/Saar) TSV Schott Mainz | TuS Koblenz | 3rd | 2019–20 |
| Germany | 2022–23 Oberliga | (Schleswig-Holstein) Kilia Kiel | SV Eichede | 3rd | 2019–20 |
| Germany | 2022–23 Oberliga | (Westfalen) Gütersloh | Preußen Münster II | 3rd | 1994–95 |
| Hungary | 2022–23 Nemzeti Bajnokság II | Diósgyőri VTK | MTK Budapest | 6th | 2010–11 |
| Hungary | 2022–23 Nemzeti Bajnokság III | (East) BVSC-Zugló | Putnok VSE | 1st | — |
| Hungary | 2022–23 Nemzeti Bajnokság III | (Center) Iváncsa | Hódmezővásárhelyi | 2nd | 2020–21 |
| Hungary | 2022–23 Nemzeti Bajnokság III | (West) VLS Veszprém | Tatabánya | 1st | — |
| Israel | 2022–23 Liga Alef | (North) Ihud Bnei Shfaram | Tzeirei Kafr Kanna | 1st | – |
| Israel | 2022–23 Liga Alef | (South) Maccabi Herzliya | Hapoel Kfar Shalem | 1st | – |
| Italy | 2022–23 Serie B | Frosinone Calcio | Genoa | 1st | – |
| Italy | 2022–23 Serie C | (Group A) Feralpisalò | Pordenone | 1st | – |
| Italy | 2022–23 Serie C | (Group B) A.C. Reggiana 1919 | Cesena | 5th | 1970–71 |
| Italy | 2022–23 Serie C | (Group C) Catanzaro 1929 | Crotone | 3rd | 1958–59 |
| Italy | 2022–23 Serie D | (Group A) Sestri Levante 1919 | Bra | 1st | – |
| Italy | 2022–23 Serie D | (Group B) Lumezzane | Alcione Milano | 1st | — |
| Italy | 2022–23 Serie D | (Group C) Legnago | Union Clodiense Chioggia | 1st | — |
| Italy | 2022–23 Serie D | (Group D) Giana Erminio | Pistoiese | 2nd | 2013–14 |
| Italy | 2022–23 Serie D | (Group E) Arezzo | Pianese | 1st | – |
| Italy | 2022–23 Serie D | (Group F) Pineto Calcio | US Vigor Senigallia | 1st | — |
| Italy | 2022–23 Serie D | (Group G) Sorrento | Paganese | 3rd | 2005–06 |
| Italy | 2022–23 Serie D | (Group H) Brindisi | Cavese | 1st | – |
| Italy | 2022–23 Serie D | (Group I) Calcio Catania | Locri | 1st | – |
| Italy | 2022–23 Eccellenza | (Abruzzo) L'Aquila | Giulianova | 1st | — |
| Italy | 2022–23 Eccellenza | (Basilicata) Rotonda | Città dei Sassi Matera | 1st | — |
| Italy | 2022–23 Eccellenza | (Calabria) Nuova Gioiese | Promosport | 1st | — |
| Malta | 2022–23 Maltese Challenge League | Sliema Wanderers | Naxxar Lions | 2nd | 1983–84 |
| Malta | 2022–23 Maltese National Amateur League | Senglea Athletic | Msida Saint-Joseph | 2nd | 2012–13 |
| Moldova | 2022–23 Moldovan Liga 1 | Dacia Buiucani | Dinamo-Auto Tiraspol | 1st | — |
| Moldova | 2022–23 Moldovan Liga 2 | (North) Iskra Rîbnița | Inter Soroca | 1st | — |
| Moldova | 2022–23 Moldovan Liga 2 | (South) Univer-Oguzsport | Zimbru-2 Chișinău | 1st | — |
| Netherlands | 2022–23 Eerste Divisie | Heracles Almelo | PEC Zwolle | 3rd | 2004–05 |
| Netherlands | 2022–23 Tweede Divisie | Katwijk | Rijnsburgse Boys | 3rd | 2021–22 |
| Netherlands | 2022–23 Derde Divisie | (Saturday) ACV | GVVV | 1st | – |
| Netherlands | 2022–23 Derde Divisie | (Sunday) ADO '20 | VVSB | 1st | – |
| Northern Ireland | 2022–23 NIFL Championship | Loughgall | Warrenpoint Town | 1st | — |
| Northern Ireland | 2022–23 NIFL Premier Intermediate League | Bangor | Ballymacash Rangers | 1st | — |
| North Macedonia | 2022–23 Macedonian Second Football League | Voska Sport | Gostivar | 1st | — |
| Portugal | 2022–23 Liga Portugal 2 | Moreirense | Farense | 3rd | 2013–14 |
| Portugal | 2022–23 Liga 3 | União de Leiria | Belenenses | 1st | — |
| Portugal | 2022–23 Campeonato de Portugal | Atlético | Vianense | 1st | Atlético |
| Romania | 2022–23 Liga II | Politehnica Iași | Steaua București | 9th | 2013–14 |
| Scotland | 2022–23 Scottish Championship | Dundee | Ayr United | 6th | 2013–14 |
| Scotland | 2022–23 Scottish League One | Dunfermline Athletic | Falkirk | 3rd | 2015–16 |
| Scotland | 2022–23 Scottish League Two | Stirling Albion | Dumbarton | 1st | — |
| Scotland | 2022–23 Highland League | Brechin City | Buckie Thistle | 1st | – |
| Scotland | 2022–23 Lowland League | The Spartans | Rangers B | 3rd | 2017–18 |
| Slovakia | 2022–23 2. Liga | FC Košice | Tatran Prešov | 1st | — |
| Slovakia | 2022–23 3. Liga | (East) Spišská Nová Ves | Odeva Lipany | 1st | – |
| Slovakia | 2022–23 3. Liga | (West) OFK Malženice | Slovan Galanta | 1st | – |
| Slovakia | 2022–23 4. Liga | (Bratislava) | | | |
| Slovakia | 2022–23 4. Liga | (Central) | | | |
| Slovakia | 2022–23 4. Liga | (East) | | | |
| Slovakia | 2022–23 4. Liga | (West) | | | |
| Spain | 2022–23 Segunda División | Granada | Las Palmas | 4th | 1967–68 |
| Spain | 2022–23 Primera Federación | | | | |
| Spain | 2022–23 Segunda Federación | | | | |
| Spain | 2022–23 Tercera Federación | | | | |
| Spain | 2022–23 Preferente Autonómica de Galicia | | | | |
| Spain | 2022–23 Primera División Autonómica de Galicia | | | | |
| Spain | 2022–23 Segunda Autonómica de Galicia | | | | |
| Spain | 2022–23 Terceira Autonómica de Galicia | Sporting Coruñés | CD Marte | 1st | — |
| Spain | 2022–23 Primera RFFPA | | | | |
| Spain | 2022–23 Segunda RFFPA | | | | |
| Spain | 2022–23 Tercera RFFPA | | | | |
| Spain | 2022–23 Regional Preferente de Cantabria | | | | |
| Spain | 2022–23 Primera Regional de Cantabria | | | | |
| Spain | 2022–23 Segunda Regional de Cantabria | | | | |
| Spain | 2022–23 División de Honor de Álava | | | | |
| Spain | 2022–23 Regional Preferente de Álava | | | | |
| Spain | 2022–23 División de Honor de Guipúzcoa | | | | |
| Spain | 2022–23 Preferente de Guipúzcoa | | | | |
| Spain | 2022–23 Primera Regional de Guipúzcoa | | | | |
| Spain | 2022–23 División de Honor de Vizcaya | | | | |
| Spain | 2022–23 Preferente de Vizcaya | | | | |
| Spain | 2022–23 Primera División de Bizkaia | | | | |
| Spain | 2022–23 Segunda División de Bizkaia | | | | |
| Spain | 2022–23 Tercera División de Bizkaia | | | | |
| Spain | 2022–23 Tercera División de Bizkaia | | | | |
| Spain | 2022–23 Primera Catalana | | | | |
| Spain | 2022–23 Segona Catalana | | | | |
| Spain | 2022–23 Tercera Catalana | | | | |
| Spain | 2022–23 Quarta Catalana | | | | |
| Turkey | 2022–23 TFF First League | Samsunspor | Çaykur Rizespor | 7th | 1992–93 |
| Turkey | 2022–23 TFF Second League | (White Group) Çorum | | 1st | — |
| Turkey | 2022–23 TFF Second League | (Red Group) Kocaelispor | | 1st | — |
| Turkey | 2022–23 TFF Third League | (Group 1) Yeni Mersin İdmanyurdu | | 1st | — |
| Turkey | 2022–23 TFF Third League | (Group 2) Iğdır | | 1st | — |
| Turkey | 2022–23 TFF Third League | (Group 3) 68 Yeni Aksarayspor | | 1st | — |
| Turkey | 2022–23 Regional Amateur League | Promoted: Mardin 1969; Kahramanmaraş İstiklalspor; Sebat Gençlikspor; Tokat Belediye Plevnespor; Karabük İdman Yurdu; Talasgücü Belediyespor; Adana 1954; Anadolu Üniversitesi; Bornova; Aliağa; Küçükçekmece Sinopspor; Sultanbeyli Belediyespor; Silivrispor; İnegöl Kafkas Gençlikspor. Via play-off promoted: Silifke Belediyespor | | | — |
| Ukraine | 2022–23 Ukrainian First League | Polissya Zhytomyr | Obolon Kyiv | 1st | — |
| Ukraine | 2022–23 Ukrainian Second League | Nyva Buzova | | 1st | — |
| Ukraine | 2022–23 Ukrainian Football Amateur League | | | | |
| Wales | 2022–23 Cymru North | Colwyn Bay | Holywell Town | 1st | – |
| Wales | 2022–23 Cymru South | Barry Town United | Llanelli Town | 1st | – |
| Wales | 2022–23 Ardal NE | Caersws | Cefn Albion | 1st | – |
| Wales | 2022–23 Ardal NW | Denbigh Town | Bangor 1876 | 1st | – |
| Wales | 2022–23 Ardal SE | Abertillery Bluebirds | Risca United | 1st | – |
| Wales | 2022–23 Ardal SW | Caerau (Ely) | Baglan Dragons | 1st | – |

=== AFC ===
| Nation | League | Champion | Second place | Title | Last honour |
|---|---|---|---|---|---|
| Australia | 2023 National Premier Leagues South Australia | Adelaide United Youth | Modbury Jets | 1st | —N/a |
| Australia | 2023 National Premier Leagues Victoria | | | | |
| Australia | 2023 National Premier Leagues Victoria 2 | | | | |
| Australia | 2023 National Premier Leagues Victoria 3 | | | | |
| Australia | 2023 State League 1 South Australia | Adelaide Croatia Raiders | Para Hills Knights | 5th | 2018 |
| Australia | 2023 State League 2 South Australia | Salisbury United | Western Strikers | 4th | 2008 |
| Australia | 2023 Victorian State League 1 | | | | |
| Australia | 2023 Victorian State League 2 | | | | |
| Australia | 2023 Victorian State League 3 | | | | |
| Australia | 2023 Victorian State League 4 | | | | |
| Australia | 2023 Victorian State League 5 | | | | |
| India | 2022–23 I-League | RoundGlass Punjab | Sreenidi Deccan | 1st | —N/a |
| India | 2022–23 I-League 2 | Delhi FC | Shillong Lajong | 1st | —N/a |
| Iran | 2022–23 Azadegan League | Shams Azar | Esteghlal Khuzestan | 1st | —N/a |
| Iran | 2022–23 League 2 | | | | |
| Iran | 2022–23 Iran Football's 3rd Division | | | | |
| Kuwait | 2022–23 Kuwaiti Division One | Al-Shabab | Khaitan | 6th | 2017–18 |
| Saudi Arabia | 2022–23 Saudi First Division League | Al-Ahli | Al-Hazem | 1st | —N/a |
| Saudi Arabia | 2022–23 Saudi Second Division | Al-Najma SC | Al-Taraji | 3rd | 2009–10 |
| Saudi Arabia | 2022–23 Saudi Third Division | Mudhar | Al-Noor | 1st | —N/a |
| Saudi Arabia | 2022–23 Saudi Fourth Division | Al-Hada | Munief | 1st | —N/a |
| Singapore | 2023 Singapore Football League 1 | Singapore Khalsa Association | Tiong Bahru | 2nd | 2022 |
| Singapore | 2023 Singapore Football League 2 | Police SA | South Avenue SC | 1st | —N/a |
| Singapore | 2023 Island Wide League | Bedok South Avenue | Tengah FC | 1st | —N/a |
| Thailand | 2022–23 Thai League 2 | Nakhon Pathom United | Trat | 1st | —N/a |
| Thailand | 2022–23 Thai League 3 | MH Nakhon Si City | Chanthaburi | 1st | —N/a |
| United Arab Emirates | 2022–23 UAE Division 1 | Hatta Club | Emirates Club | 2nd | 2015–16 |
| United Arab Emirates | 2022–23 UAE Second Division League | Gulf United | United | 1st | —N/a |
| United Arab Emirates | 2022–23 UAE Third Division League | Royal | Al Dahra | 1st | —N/a |

=== CAF ===
| Nation | League | Champion | Second place | Title | Last honour |
|---|---|---|---|---|---|
| Algeria | 2022–23 Algerian Ligue 2 | (Center West Group) ES Ben Aknoun | ES Mostaganem | 1st | — |
| Algeria | 2022–23 Algerian Ligue 2 | (Center East Group) US Souf | AS Khroub | 1st | — |
| Algeria | 2022–23 Algerian Inter-Regions League | (West Group) WA Mostaganem | IS Tighennif | | |
| Algeria | 2022–23 Algerian Inter-Regions League | (Center West Group) ESM Kolea | JS El Biar | | |
| Algeria | 2022–23 Algerian Inter-Regions League | (Center East Group) Olympique Akbou | JS Djijel | | |
| Algeria | 2022–23 Algerian Inter-Regions League | (East Group) MSP Batna | USF Constantine | | |
| Algeria | 2022–23 Algerian Inter-Regions League | (South West Group) JS Guir | CRB Adrar | | |
| Algeria | 2022–23 Algerian Inter-Regions League | (South East Group) O Magrane | CR Beni Thour | | |
| Morocco | 2022–23 Botola 2 | Renaissance Zemamra | Youssoufia Berrechid | 2nd | 2018–19 |
| Morocco | 2022–23 Moroccan Amateur National Division | Kawkab Marrakech | COD Meknès | 2nd | 1951–52 |
| Morocco | 2022–23 Moroccan Amateur Division I | (North Group) US Yacoub el Mansour | (South Group) Mouloudia Assa | | |
| Morocco | 2022–23 Moroccan Amateur Division II | (North East Group) Hilal de Nador | Renaissance Zaio | | |
| Morocco | 2022–23 Moroccan Amateur Division II | (North West Group) AJS | Raja U23 | | |
| Morocco | 2022–23 Moroccan Amateur Division II | (South Group) Fath Sidi Bennour | Union Taroudant | | |
| Morocco | 2022–23 Moroccan Amateur Division II | (Sahara Group) Najm Tarfaya | Olympique Phosboucraa | | |
| Morocco | 2022–23 Moroccan Amateur Division III | (North League) Etudiants De Tetouan | Raja Bni Makada | | |
| Morocco | 2022–23 Moroccan Amateur Division III | (East League) USSB | Hassania Nador | | |
| Morocco | 2022–23 Moroccan Amateur Division III | (Béni Mellal-Khénifra League) Olympique Boulanouar | Olympique Boujniba | | |
| Morocco | 2022–23 Moroccan Amateur Division III | (Casablanca League) Nouaceur Ouled Saleh | AS Club Lanoria | | |
| Morocco | 2022–23 Moroccan Amateur Division III | (Drâa-Tafilalet League) Ittihad Zagora | Hassania Akdez | | |
| Morocco | 2022–23 Moroccan Amateur Division III | (Souss League) Majd Inchaden | Chabab El Khayame | | |
| Morocco | 2022–23 Moroccan Amateur Division III | (Chaouia-Doukkala League) Anwar Sidi Bennour | Jeunesse Deroua Sportive | | |
| Morocco | 2022–23 Moroccan Amateur Division III | (Marrakesh-Safi League) Amal Ait Ourir | Achbal Hay Mohammadi | | |
| Morocco | 2022–23 Moroccan Amateur Division III | (Rabat-Salé-Kénitra) Essafae de salé | Atlas Oualmas | | |
| South Africa | 2022–23 National First Division | Polokwane City | Cape Town Spurs | 1st | — |
| South Africa | 2022–23 SAFA Second Division | Upington City | Orbit College | 1st | |

=== CONCACAF ===
| Nation | League | Champion | Second place | Title | Last honour |
|---|---|---|---|---|---|
| Canada | 2023 Canadian Soccer League | Scarborough SC | Serbian White Eagles | 2nd | 2021 |

=== CONMEBOL ===
| Nation | League | Champion | Second place | Title | Last honour |
|---|---|---|---|---|---|
| Argentina | 2023 Primera Nacional | | | | |
| Argentina | 2023 Primera B Metropolitana | | | | |
| Argentina | 2023 Primera C Metropolitana | | | | |
| Argentina | 2023 Primera D Metropolitana | | | | |
| Argentina | 2023 Torneo Federal A | | | | |
| Argentina | 2023 Torneo Regional Federal Amateur | Promoted: 9 de Julio de Rafaela; Atenas de Río Cuarto; El Linqueño; Germinal; Atlético San Martín de Mendoza; Sol de América de Formosa | | | All teams are at the first promotion |
| Brazil | 2023 Campeonato Brasileiro Série B | Vitória | Juventude | 1st | —N/a |
| Brazil | 2023 Campeonato Brasileiro Série C | Amazonas | Brusque | 1st | —N/a |
| Brazil | 2023 Campeonato Brasileiro Série D | Ferroviário | Ferroviária | 2nd | 2018 |
| Brazil | 2023 Campeonato Acreano | Rio Branco-AC | Humaitá | 49th | 2021 |
| Brazil | 2023 Campeonato Alagoano | CRB | ASA | 33rd | 2022 |
| Brazil | 2023 Campeonato Alagoano Série B | Penedense | Zumbi | 3rd | 2004 |
| Brazil | 2023 Campeonato Amapaense | Trem | Independente | 8th | 2022 |
| Brazil | 2023 Campeonato Amazonense | Amazonas | Manauara | 1st | —N/a |
| Brazil | 2023 Campeonato Amazonense Série B | Unidos do Alvorada | São Raimundo-AM | 1st | —N/a |
| Brazil | 2023 Campeonato Baiano | EC Bahia | EC Jacuipense | 50th | 2020 |
| Brazil | 2023 Campeonato Baiano Série B | Jequié | Jacobina | 3rd | 2017 |
| Brazil | 2023 Campeonato Brasiliense | Real Brasília FC | Brasiliense FC | 1st | —N/a |
| Brazil | 2023 Campeonato Brasiliense Segunda Divisão | Ceilandense | Planaltina | 2nd | 2009 |
| Brazil | 2023 Campeonato Capixaba | Real Noroeste | Nova Venécia | 3rd | 2022 |
| Brazil | 2023 Campeonato Capixaba Série B | Jaguaré | Rio Branco-VN | 1st | —N/a |
| Brazil | 2023 Campeonato Carioca | Fluminense FC | CR Flamengo | 33rd | 2022 |
| Brazil | 2023 Campeonato Carioca Série A2 | Sampaio Corrêa-RJ | Olaria | 1st | —N/a |
| Brazil | 2023 Campeonato Carioca Série B1 | Duque de Caxias | Serrano | 1st | —N/a |
| Brazil | 2023 Campeonato Carioca Série B2 | São Cristóvão | Belford Roxo | 1st | —N/a |
| Brazil | 2023 Campeonato Carioca Série C | Zinzane | São Cristóvão | 1st | —N/a |
| Brazil | 2023 Campeonato Catarinense | Criciúma EC | Brusque FC | 11th | 2013 |
| Brazil | 2023 Campeonato Catarinense Série B | Nação | Inter de Lages | 1st | —N/a |
| Brazil | 2023 Campeonato Catarinense Série C | Tubarão | Blumenau | 2nd | 2007 |
| Brazil | 2023 Campeonato Cearense | Fortaleza EC | Ceará SC | 46th | 2022 |
| Brazil | 2023 Campeonato Cearense Série B | Horizonte FC | Floresta EC | 2nd | 2007 |
| Brazil | 2023 Campeonato Cearense Série C | Maranguape | Cariri | 1st | —N/a |
| Brazil | 2023 Campeonato Gaúcho | Grêmio FBPA | SER Caxias do Sul | 42nd | 2022 |
| Brazil | 2023 Campeonato Gaúcho Série A2 | Santa Cruz | Guarany de Bagé | 1st | —N/a |
| Brazil | 2023 Campeonato Gaúcho Segunda Divisão | Cruzeiro-RS | Futebol com Vida | 1st | —N/a |
| Brazil | 2023 Campeonato Goiano | AC Goianiense | Goiás EC | 17th | 2022 |
| Brazil | 2023 Campeonato Goiano Divisão de Acesso | Goiatuba | Jataiense | 4th | 2021 |
| Brazil | 2023 Campeonato Goiano Terceira Divisão | ABECAT | Trindade | 1st | —N/a |
| Brazil | 2023 Campeonato Maranhense | Maranhão AC | Moto Club | 15th | 2013 |
| Brazil | 2023 Campeonato Maranhense Série B | Tuntum | Imperatriz | 1st | —N/a |
| Brazil | 2023 Campeonato Mato-Grossense | Cuiabá EC | União Rondonópolis | 12nd | 2022 |
| Brazil | 2023 Campeonato Mato-Grossense Segunda Divisão | Primavera | Araguaia | 1st | —N/a |
| Brazil | 2023 Campeonato Mineiro | CA Mineiro | América FC | 48th | 2022 |
| Brazil | 2023 Campeonato Mineiro Módulo II | Itabirito | Uberlândia | 1st | —N/a |
| Brazil | 2023 Campeonato Mineiro Segunda Divisão | Mamoré | Valeriodoce | 3rd | 2009 |
| Brazil | 2023 Campeonato Paraense | Águia de Marabá | Remo | 1st | —N/a |
| Brazil | 2023 Campeonato Paraense Série B | Canaã | Santa Rosa | 1st | —N/a |
| Brazil | 2023 Campeonato Paraense Série B2 | Pinheirense | Paraense | 1st | —N/a |
| Brazil | 2023 Campeonato Paraibano | Treze FC | Sousa EC | 17th | 2020 |
| Brazil | 2023 Campeonato Paraibano Segunda Divisão | Atlético Cajazeirense | Pombal | 2nd | 2012 |
| Brazil | 2023 Campeonato Paraibano Terceira Divisão | Cruzeiro-PB | Santa Rita | 1st | —N/a |
| Brazil | 2023 Campeonato Paranaense | Athletico Paranaense | FC Cascavel | 27th | 2020 |
| Brazil | 2023 Campeonato Paranaense Segunda Divisão | Andraus | PSTC | 1st | —N/a |
| Brazil | 2023 Campeonato Paranaense Terceira Divisão | Paranavaí | Nacional de Rolândia | 1st | —N/a |
| Brazil | 2023 Campeonato Paulista | SE Palmeiras | EC Água Santa | 25th | 2022 |
| Brazil | 2023 Campeonato Paulista Série A2 | AA Ponte Preta | Grêmio Novorizontino | 4th | 1969 |
| Brazil | 2023 Campeonato Paulista Série A3 | Capivariano | São José-SP | 2nd | 1984 |
| Brazil | 2023 Campeonato Paulista Segunda Divisão | União São João | Catanduva | 1st | —N/a |
| Brazil | 2023 Campeonato Pernambucano | Sport | Retrô | 43rd | 2019 |
| Brazil | 2023 Campeonato Pernambucano Série A2 | Afogados da Ingazeira | Vitória das Tabocas | 1st | —N/a |
| Brazil | 2023 Campeonato Piauiense | River AC | Fluminense EC | 32nd | 2019 |
| Brazil | 2023 Campeonato Piauiense Série B | Oirense | Picos | 2nd | 2021 |
| Brazil | 2023 Campeonato Potiguar | América de Natal | ABC | 37th | 2019 |
| Brazil | 2023 Campeonato Potiguar Segunda Divisão | Baraúnas | Parnamirim | 1st | —N/a |
| Brazil | 2023 Campeonato Rondoniense | Porto Velho | Ji-Paraná | 3rd | 2021 |
| Brazil | 2023 Campeonato Roraimense | São Raimundo-RR | GAS | 14th | 2022 |
| Brazil | 2023 Campeonato Sergipano | Itabaiana | Confiança | 11th | 2012 |
| Brazil | 2023 Campeonato Sergipano Série A2 | Carmópolis | Olímpico de Itabaianinha | 1st | —N/a |
| Brazil | 2023 Campeonato Sul-Mato-Grossense | Costa Rica | Operário-MS | 2nd | 2021 |
| Brazil | 2023 Campeonato Sul-Mato-Grossense Série B | Portuguesa-MS | Corumbaense | 1st | —N/a |
| Brazil | 2023 Campeonato Tocantinense | Tocantinópolis EC | Capital FC | 7th | 2022 |
| Brazil | 2023 Campeonato Tocantinense Segunda Divisão | Batalhão | Araguaína | 1st | —N/a |
| Uruguay | 2023 Campeonato Uruguayo de Segunda División | | | | |
| Uruguay | 2023 Campeonato Uruguayo de Primera División Amateur | | | | |

=== OFC ===
| Nation | Tournament | Champion | Second place | Title | Last honour |
|---|---|---|---|---|---|
| New Zealand | 2023 Northern League | Auckland City | Eastern Suburbs | 3rd | 2022 |
| New Zealand | 2023 Central League | Wellington Olympic | Wellington Phoenix Reserves | 5th | 2022 |
| New Zealand | 2023 Southern League | Christchurch United | Cashmere Technical | 2nd | 2022 |
| New Zealand | 2023 NRFL Leagues | (Championship) Tauranga City | East Coast Bays | 2nd | 1992 |
| New Zealand | 2023 NRFL Leagues | (Northern Conference) Franklin United | Bucklands Beach | 1st | — |
| New Zealand | 2023 NRFL Leagues | (Southern Conference) Waikato Unicol | Cambridge | 1st | — |
| New Zealand | 2023 Central Federation League | Palmerston North Marist | Palmerston North United | 3rd | 2018 |
| New Zealand | 2023 Capital Premier | Wellington Olympic Reserves | Island Bay United | 2nd | 1991 |
| New Zealand | 2023 Mainland Premier League | Universities | Cashmere Technical Reserves | 1st | — |
| New Zealand | 2023 Southern Premier League | Mosgiel | Roslyn-Wakari | 2nd | 2019 |

== Domestic cups (Second, third, fourth, and fifth leagues) ==
=== AFC ===
| Nation | Tournament | Champion | Final score | Second place | Title | Last honour |
|---|---|---|---|---|---|---|
| Australia | 2023 Capital Territory Charity Shield | Canberra Croatia | 4–1 | Monaro Panthers | 3rd | 2021 |
| Australia | 2023 FSA Federation Cup | North Eastern MetroStars | 3–2 (a.e.t.) | Campbelltown City | 6th | 2017 |
| Australia | 2023 FV Community Shield | Oakleigh Cannons | 4–0 | Bentleigh Greens | 1st | —N/a |
| Singapore | 2023 SFL Challenge Cup | Singapore Khalsa Association | 2-1 | Yishun Sentek Mariners | 1st | —N/a |
| Singapore | 2023 Singapore FA Cup | Yishun Sentek Mariners | 3-2 | Singapore Khalsa Association | 2nd | 2018 |

=== CONMEBOL ===
| Nation | Tournament | Champion | Final score | Second place | Title | Last honour |
|---|---|---|---|---|---|---|
| Brazil | 2023 Copa Alagoas de Futebol | CSE | 1–1 (5–4 p) | ASA | 1st | – |
| Brazil | 2023 Recopa Mineira | Athletic Club | 1–0 | Democrata GV | 1st | – |
| Brazil | 2023 Recopa Gaúcha | Grêmio | 4–1 | EC São Luiz | 4th | 2022 |
| Brazil | 2023 Recopa Catarinense | Brusque FC | 1–0 | Marcílio Dias | 2nd | 2020 |
| Brazil | 2023 Copa Fares Lopes | | | | | |

=== UEFA ===
| Nation | Tournament | Champion | Final score | Second place | Title | Last honour |
|---|---|---|---|---|---|---|
| England | 2022–23 EFL Trophy | Bolton Wanderers | 4–0 | Plymouth Argyle | 2nd | 1988–89 |
| England | 2022–23 FA Vase | Ascot United | 1–0 | Newport Pagnell Town | 1st | – |
| England | 2022–23 Alan Turvey Trophy | Aveley | 3–0 | Potters Bar Town | 2nd | 1989–90 |
| England | 2022–23 Berks & Bucks Senior Cup | | | | | |
| England | 2022–23 Bedfordshire Senior Cup | Luton Town | 6–2 | Biggleswade Town | 10th | 2017-18 |
| England | 2022–23 Birmingham Senior Cup | | | | | |
| England | 2022–23 Cheshire Senior Cup | | | | | |
| England | 2022–23 Cumberland Senior Cup | | | | | |
| England | 2022–23 Derbyshire Senior Cup | | | | | |
| England | 2022–23 Durham County Challenge Cup | | | | | |
| Finland | 2023 Ykkoscup | JäPS | 0–0 (4–3 p) | IF Gnistan | 1st | — |
| Israel | 2022–23 Toto Cup Leumit | Hapoel Rishon LeZion | 1–0 | Hapoel Nir Ramat HaSharon | 2nd | 2012–13 |
| Italy | 2022–23 Coppa Italia Serie C | Vicenza | 5–3 | Juventus Next Gen | 2nd | 1981–82 |
| Republic of Ireland | 2022–23 Leinster Senior Cup | | | | | |
| Scotland | 2022–23 Scottish Challenge Cup | Hamilton Academical | 1–0 | Raith Rovers | 3rd | 1992–93 |
| Spain | 2022–23 Copa Catalunya | FC Andorra | 1–0 | Badalona Futur | 2nd | 1993–94 |
| Wales | 2022–23 Aberystwyth League League Cup | | | | | — |
| Wales | 2022–23 NEWFA Challenge Cup | | | | | — |
| Wales | 2022–23 NEWFA Premier Cup | | 6 May | | | — |

== Women's second, third, fourth, and fifth leagues ==
=== UEFA ===
| Nation | Tournament | Champion | Second place | Title | Last honour |
|---|---|---|---|---|---|
| Armenia | 2022-23 Armenian Women's First League | Pyunik Girls-2 | Syunik FC | 1st | – |
| England | 2022–23 Women's Championship | Bristol City | Birmingham City | 1st | – |
| England | 2022–23 Women's National League Premier Division | (Northern) Nottingham Forest | Wolverhampton Wanderers | 1st | – |
| England | 2022–23 Women's National League Premier Division | (Southern) Watford | Ipswich Town | 1st | – |
| Scotland | 2022–23 SWPL 2 | Montrose | Gartcairn | 1st | – |
| Scotland | 2022–23 Scottish Women's Championship | Livingston | Rossvale | 1st | – |
| Scotland | 2022–23 Scottish Women's League One | FC Edinburgh | Westdyke | 1st | – |
| Spain | 2022–23 Primera Federación (women) | FC Barcelona B | Eibar | 1st | – |
| Spain | 2022–23 Segunda Federación (women) | Atlético Madrid B | CE Europa | 1st | – |

=== AFC ===
| Nation | League | Champion | Second place | Title | Last honour |
|---|---|---|---|---|---|
| Saudi Arabia | 2022–23 Saudi Women's First Division League | Al-Riyadh | United | 1st | —N/a |
| Singapore | 2023 Women's National League | Royal Arion | Mattar Sailors | 1st | —N/a |

=== CAF ===
| Nation | Tournament | Champion | Second place | Title | Last honour |
|---|---|---|---|---|---|
| Algeria | 2022–23 Algerian Women's D1 National Championship | (Center West) AS Evasion Bejaia | CSASF Temouchent | | |
| Algeria | 2022–23 Algerian Women's D1 National Championship | (Center East) USF Bejaia | Wafa Hassi Messaoud | | |
| Morocco | 2021–22 Moroccan Women's Championship Division Two | (North Group) Hilal Temara | RS Berkane | | |
| Morocco | 2021–22 Moroccan Women's Championship Division Two | (South Group) PFAM | OC Khouribga | | |
| South Africa | 2023 Sasol Women's League | University of Fort Hare | Lindelani Ladies | 1st | —N/a |

=== CONMEBOL ===
| Nation | Tournament | Champion | Second place | Title | Last honour |
|---|---|---|---|---|---|
| Brazil | 2023 Campeonato Brasileiro de Futebol Feminino Série A2 | Red Bull Bragantino | Fluminense | 2nd | 2021 |
| Brazil | 2023 Campeonato Brasileiro de Futebol Feminino Série A3 | Mixto | Remo | 1st | — |

=== OFC ===
| Nation | League | Champion | Second place | Title | Last honour |
|---|---|---|---|---|---|
| New Zealand | 2023 NRFL Women's Premiership | Auckland United | Eastern Suburbs | 1st | — |

== Domestic cups (Women's second, third, fourth, and fifth leagues) ==
=== UEFA ===
| Nation | Tournament | Champion | Final score | Second place | Title | Last honour |
|---|---|---|---|---|---|---|
| Scotland | 2022–23 SWF Championship and League One Cup | FC Edinburgh | 0–0 (5–4 p) | Dryburgh Athletic | 1st | – |
| Wales | 2023 NEWFA Women's Cup | Airbus | 21 May 2023 | Connah's Quay Nomads | | |

=== AFC ===
| Nation | Tournament | Champion | Final score | Second place | Title | Last honour |
|---|---|---|---|---|---|---|
| Australia | 2023 Capital Football Women's Charity Shield | Canberra Croatia | 1–0 | Canberra Olympic | 2nd | 2022 |

=== CONMEBOL ===
| Nation | Tournament | Champion | Final score | Second place | Title | Last honour |
|---|---|---|---|---|---|---|
| Brazil | 2023 Copa Rio de Futebol Feminino | | | | | – |

== Men's university leagues ==
=== AFC ===
| Nation | League | Champion | Second place | Title | Last honour |
|---|---|---|---|---|---|
| Philippines | 2022–23 UAAP Men's Football Championship (Season 85) | FEU Tamaraws | Ateneo Blue Eagles | 5th | 2014–15 |

=== CONCACAF ===
| Nation | League | Champion | Second place | Title | Last honour |
|---|---|---|---|---|---|
| Canada | 2023 U Sports Men's Soccer Championship | CBU Capers | Montreal Carabins | 2nd | 2017 |
| United States | 2023 NCAA Division I men's soccer tournament | Clemson Tigers | Notre Dame Fighting Irish | 4th | 2021 |
| United States | 2023 NCAA Division II men's soccer tournament | Franklin Pierce Ravens | CSU Pueblo ThunderWolves | 3rd | 2022 |
| United States | 2023 NCAA Division III men's soccer tournament | St. Olaf Oles | Amherst Mammoths | 1st | —N/a |
| United States | 2023 NAIA Men's Soccer Championship | MidAmerica Nazarene Pioneers | Milligan Buffaloes | 1st | —N/a |

== Women's university leagues ==
=== AFC ===
| Nation | League | Champion | Second place | Title | Last honour |
|---|---|---|---|---|---|
| Philippines | 2022–23 UAAP Women's Football Championship (Season 85) | FEU Lady Tamaraws | De La Salle Lady Archers | 11th | 2014–15 |

=== CAF ===
| Nation | League | Champion | Second place | Title | Last honour |
|---|---|---|---|---|---|
| South Africa | 2023 Women's Varsity Football | University of the Western Cape | University of Johannesburg | 2nd | 2021 |

=== CONCACAF ===
| Nation | League | Champion | Second place | Title | Last honour |
|---|---|---|---|---|---|
| Canada | 2023 U Sports Women's Soccer Championship | UBC Thunderbirds | Trinity Western Spartans | 8th | 2019 |
| United States | 2023 NCAA Division I women's soccer tournament | Florida State Seminoles | Stanford Cardinal | 4th | 2021 |
| United States | 2023 NCAA Division II women's soccer tournament | Point Loma Sea Lions | Washburn Ichabods | 1st | —N/a |
| United States | 2023 NCAA Division III women's soccer tournament | Cal Lutheran Regals | Washington (MO) Bears | 1st | —N/a |
| United States | 2023 NAIA Women's Soccer Championship | Cumberlands Patriots | William Carey Crusaders | 1st | —N/a |

== Youth leagues ==
=== UEFA ===
| Nation | League | Champion | Second place | Title | Last honour |
|---|---|---|---|---|---|
| England | 2022–23 Professional U21 Development League | Manchester City U21 (Premier League 2); Southampton U21 (Division 2) | Liverpool U21 (Premier League 2); Leeds United U21 (Division 2) | 3rd 1st | 2021–22 — |
| England | 2022–23 Professional Development League | Millwall U21 | Sheffield United U21 | 1st | — |
| England | 2022–23 U18 Premier League | Manchester City U18 | West Ham United U18 | 10th | 2021–22 |
| Italy | 2022–23 Campionato Primavera 1 | US Lecce | | 3rd | 2003–04 |
| Italy | 2022–23 Campionato Primavera 2 | (Group A) Genoa | | 1st | — |
| Italy | 2022–23 Campionato Primavera 2 | (Group B) Lazio | | 1st | — |
| Italy | 2022–23 Campionato Primavera 3 | (Group A) Renate | Südtirol | 1st | — |
| Italy | 2022–23 Campionato Primavera 3 | (Group B) Palermo | Bari | 1st | — |
| Italy | 2022–23 Campionato Primavera 4 | (Group A) Pro Patria | Pergolettese | 1st | — |
| Italy | 2022–23 Campionato Primavera 4 | (Group B) Fidelis Andria | Montevarchi | 1st | — |
| Poland | 2022–23 Central Junior League | Lech Poznań Under 19 | Górnik Zabrze Under 19 | 1st | — |
| Russia | 2022–23 Russian Youth Championship | Krasnodar Under 19 | Zenit St. Petersburg Under 19 | 2nd | 2017–18 |
| Scotland | 2022–23 SPFL Reserve League | Hibernian | Motherwell | 5th | 1948–49 |
| Ukraine | 2022–23 Ukrainian Premier League Under-19 | Rukh Lviv U19 | Dynamo Kyiv U19 | 2nd | 2021–22 |

=== AFC ===
| Nation | League | Champion | Second place | Title | Last honour |
|---|---|---|---|---|---|
| Saudi Arabia | 2022–23 U19 Youth League | Al-Ahli | Al-Nassr | 11th | 2017–18 |
| Saudi Arabia | 2022–23 U17 Youth League | Al-Nassr | Al-Ettifaq | 7th | 2017–18 |
| Saudi Arabia | 2022–23 U15 Youth League | Al-Hilal | Al-Fateh | 2nd | 2018–19 |
| Saudi Arabia | 2022–23 U13 Youth League | Al-Shabab | Al-Ittihad | 1st | – |

=== CAF ===
| Nation | League | Champion | Second place | Title | Last honour |
|---|---|---|---|---|---|
| Algeria | 2022–23 Algerian U21 League 1 | CS Constantine U21 | CR Belouizdad U21 | | |
| Algeria | 2022–23 Algerian U19 League 1 | | | | |
| Algeria | 2022–23 Algerian U17 League 1 | | | | |
| Algeria | 2022–23 Algerian U15 League 1 | | | | |
| Morocco | 2022–23 Moroccan Espoirs's League | (North Group) RS Berkane | (South Group) Olympique Dcheira | | |
| Morocco | 2022–23 Moroccan National Championship for Youth (U19) | | | | |
| South Africa | 2023 PSL Reserve League | SuperSport United U23 | Orlando Pirates U23 | 1st | — |

=== OFC ===
| Nation | League | Champion | Second place | Title | Last honour |
|---|---|---|---|---|---|
| New Zealand | 2023 National Youth League | Wellington Phoenix Academy | Fencibles United | 1st | — |

== Youth cups ==
=== UEFA ===
| Nation | Tournament | Champion | Final score | Second place | Title | Last honour |
|---|---|---|---|---|---|---|
| England | 2022–23 FA Youth Cup | West Ham United | 5–1 | Arsenal | 4th | 1999 |
| Germany | 2022–23 DFB Junioren Pokal | 1. FC Köln under-19 | 4–3 (a.e.t.) | FC Schalke 04 under-19 | 2nd | 2012–13 |
| Italy | 2022–23 Coppa Italia Primavera | AS Roma | 2–1 (a.e.t.) | Fiorentina | 6th | 2016–17 |
| Italy | 2023 Supercoppa Primavera 2 | Lazio | 4–0 | Genoa | 1st | — |
| Portugal | 2023 Taça Revelação U23 | Braga U23 | 1–1 (a.e.t.) (5–3 p) | Estoril Praia U23 | 1st | — |
| Scotland | 2022–23 Scottish Youth Cup | Celtic | 6–5 (a.e.t) | Rangers | 16th | 2016–17 |

=== CAF ===
| Nation | Tournament | Champion | Final score | Second place | Title | Last honour |
|---|---|---|---|---|---|---|
| Algeria | 2022–23 Algerian Reserve League Cup | MC Alger U21 | 1–1 (6–5 p) | CR Belouizdad U21 | 1st | — |

== Retirements ==
=== March ===
- 22 March – Mesut Özil, 34, German midfielder.

== Deaths ==
=== January ===
- 1 January – Frank McGarvey, 66, Scottish footballer (Celtic, St Mirren)
- 5 January – Ernesto Castano, 83, Italian footballer (Juventus)
- 6 January – Gianluca Vialli, 58, Italian football player (Cremonese, Sampdoria, Juventus, Chelsea) and manager (Chelsea, Watford)
- 7 January – Modeste M'bami, 40, Cameroonian footballer (Paris Saint-Germain, Marseille)
- 8 January - Roberto Dinamite, 68, Brazilian footballer (Vasco da Gama)
- 9 January - Rainer Ulrich, 73, German football player (Karlsruher SC) and manager (Karlsruher SC, VfR Mannheim, Bayern Munich II)
- 10 January - Gaudenzio Bernasconi, 90, Italian footballer (Sampdoria)
- 19 January - Anton Walkes, 25, English footballer (Atlanta United FC, Portsmouth, Charlotte FC)
- 23 January - Patrizio Billio, 48, Italian footballer (Crystal Palace, Dundee)

=== February ===
- 1 February – Benny Dollo, Indonesian football coach
- 6 February – Christian Atsu, Ghanaian footballer
- 7 February – Ahmet Eyüp Türkaslan, Turkish footballer
- 12 February – Yousef Al-Salem, 37, Saudi Arabian footballer (Al-Qadsiah, Al-Ettifaq, Al-Hilal, Al-Jubail)
- 21 February – Amancio, 83, Spanish footballer (Real Madrid)
- 28 February – Abdoh Besisi, 45, Saudi Arabian footballer (Al-Ahli, Al-Ansar, Al-Orobah, Ohod)

=== March ===
- 1 March – Antal Bárfy, Hungarian footballer
- 1 March – Just Fontaine, French footballer
- 5 March – Karounga Keïta, Malian footballer (Sport Afrique, Bordeaux)
- 5 March – Mabo Ismaila, Nigerian football manager
- 8 March – Italo Galbiati, Italian footballer
- 9 March – Alan Jones, Welsh footballer
- 15 March – Mimis Papaioannou, Greek football player and manager
- March – Don Megson, English football player and manager
- 18 March – Heinz Steinmann, German footballer
- 19 March – Petar Nadoveza, Croatian football player and manager
- 21 March – Willie Bell, 85, Scottish football player (Queen's Park, Leeds United, Leicester City, Brighton & Hove Albion) and manager (Birmingham City, Lincoln City, Liberty Flames)
- 22 March – Tony Knapp, English football player and manager
- 23 March – Peter Marti, Swiss footballer
- 28 March – Manfred Schaefer, German football player and manager

=== April ===
- 1 April – John Sainty, English footballer
- 2 April – Gilbert Bailliu, Belgian footballer
- 4 April – Birger Jensen, Danish footballer
- 5 April – Sergio Gori, Italian footballer
- 11 April – Miguel Escobar, Colombian footballer
- 16 April – Eddie Colquhoun, Scottish footballer
- 20 April – Josep Maria Fusté, Spanish footballer
- 21 April – Juan Carlos Sarnari, Argentine footballer

=== May ===
- 4 May – Terry Vaughn, American referee
- 5 May – Arsenio Iglesias, Spanish football player and manager
- 8 May – Neil Matthews, English footballer
- 9 May – Antonio Carbajal, Mexican football player and manager who played at 5 World Cups
- May – David Mitogo, Equatorial Guinean footballer
- 14 May – Ferran Olivella, Spanish footballer
- 16 May
  - Iñaki Alkiza, Spanish footballer
  - Per Røntved, Danish footballer
  - Nelsinho Rosa, Brazilian football player and manager
- 17 May – Jan Olsson, Swedish footballer
- 29 May – Javier Yacuzzi, Argentine footballer

=== June ===
- 3 June – Josser Watling, English footballer
- 6 June – Gints Freimanis, Latvian footballer
- 8 June
  - Jorge Roldán, Guatemalan football player and manager
  - Rale Rasic, Bosnian football player and manager
- 10 June
  - Clive Barker, South African football manager
  - Jari Niinimäki, Finnish footballer
- 14 June – John Hollins, English football player and manager
- 15 June – Gordon McQueen, Scottish footballer
- 16 June – Norman Burtenshaw, English referee
- 19 June
  - Karolis Chvedukas, Lithuanian footballer
  - Gaetano Troja, Italian footballer
- 21 June – Ronnie Nolan, Irish footballer
- 22 June
  - Stéphane Demol, Belgian football player and manager
  - Horst-Dieter Höttges, German footballer
- 24 June – Cédric Roussel, Belgian footballer
- 26 June – Craig Brown, Scottish football player and manager

=== July ===
- July – Wayne Evans, Welsh footballer
- 1 July – Christian Dalger, French football player and manager
- 2 July – Theo Pahlplatz, Dutch footballer
- 4 July
  - Georges Bereta, French footballer
  - John Berylson, American businessman and soccer executive
- 6 July – Attila Abonyi, Hungarian-born Australian soccer player
- 9 July
  - Asbjørn Sennels, Danish footballer
  - Luis Suárez, Spanish football player and manager
- 10 July – Ümit Birol, Turkish football player and manager
- 11 July – Philippe Garot, Belgian footballer
- 13 July – Chris Garland, English footballer
- 15 July – Vítor Godinho, Portuguese footballer
- 17 July
  - Robert Budzynski, French footballer
  - Palhinha, Brazilian football player and manager
- 18 July – Mike Hellawell, English footballer
- 20 July – José Sulantay, Chilean football manager
- 21 July – Jacinto Santos, Portuguese footballer
- 22 July
  - Hassan Amcharrat, Moroccan footballer
  - Paul Hince, English footballer
  - Ernesto Mastrángelo, Argentinian footballer
  - Adolf Scherer, Slovak footballer
- 24 July
  - Trevor Francis, English football player and manager
  - Chris Bart-Williams, English footballer
- 28 July – Benny Rooney, Scottish football player and manager
- 30 July – Jorge Domínguez, Argentinian footballer

=== August ===
- 1 August – Tony Brien, Irish footballer
- 6 August – Veniamin Mandrykin, Russian footballer
- 9 August – John Coddington, English footballer
- 31 August – Arthur Leong, New Zealand footballer

=== September ===
- 17 September – Ronnie MacKinnon, Scottish footballer
- 21 September – Maddy Cusack, English footballer

=== October ===
- 1 October – Frank McDougall, Scottish footballer
- 15 October – Gerry Ryan, Irish footballer
- 21 October
  - Reino Börjesson, Swedish footballer
  - Bobby Charlton, English football player and manager
  - Bill Gates, English footballer
- 29 October – Charlie Aitken, Scottish footballer
- Ronnie Rees, Welsh footballer

=== November ===
- 2 November – Oussama Falouh, Moroccan footballer
- 5 November – Bongi Ntuli, South African footballer
- 7 November
  - Mário Moinhos, Portuguese footballer
  - Federico Sacchi, Argentine footballer
- 25 November – Terry Venables, English football player and manager

=== December ===
- 13 December – David Wallace, New Zealand footballer
