= 2023 Fiji Football Association Cup Tournament =

- Dates: 9–18 June 2023

Final positions
- Champions: Lautoka
- Runners-up: Rewa

The 2023 Digicel FA Cup Tournament is the 33rd edition of the FF Cup. The tournament will consist of 8 participants from Fiji's top division. The defending champions are Suva F.C.

== Teams ==
Eight teams from the 2023 Fiji Premier League will participate in this tournament.

Team	Location
Ba	Ba
Labasa	Labasa
Lautoka	Lautoka
Nadi	Nadi
Navua	Navua
Rewa	Nausori
Suva	Suva
Tailevu Naitasiri	Tailevu

== Venue ==
Suva will be the competition hosts.

Suva
HFC Bank Stadium
Capacity: 15,000
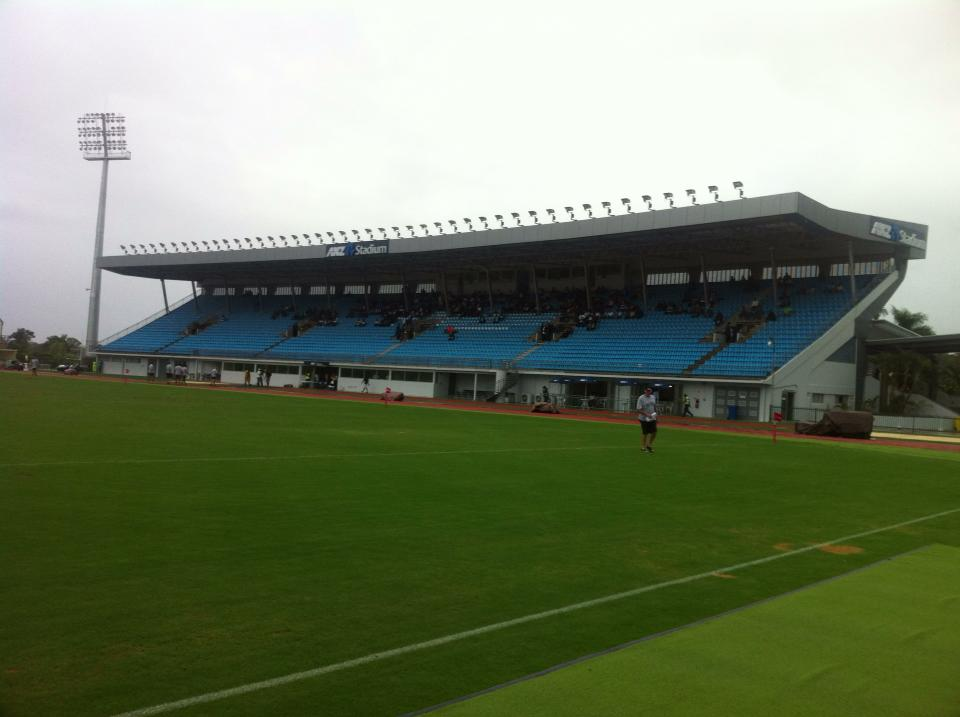
2023 Fiji Football Association Cup Tournament (Fiji)

== Group stage ==
The eight teams will be split into two groups of four. The top two will advance to a semifinal. The draw took place on 9 May 2023.

This stage will take place from June 9 to June 11.

=== Group A ===
Pos	Team	Pld	W	D	L	GF	GA	GD	Pts	Qualification
1	Lautoka	3	2	1	0	6	3	+3	7	Knockout stage
2	Ba	3	2	1	0	5	3	+2	7	Knockout stage
3	Suva	3	1	0	2	5	4	+1	3	
4	Navua	3	0	0	3	4	10	−6	0	

9 June 2023

Suva	0–1	Lautoka

HFC Bank Stadium, Suva
9 June 2023

Ba	2–1	Navua

HFC Bank Stadium, Suva

10 June 2023

Navua	2–4	Lautoka

HFC Bank Stadium, Suva
10 June 2023

Ba	2–1	Suva

HFC Bank Stadium, Suva

11 June 2023

Suva	4–1	Navua

HFC Bank Stadium, Suva
11 June 2023

Lautoka	1–1	Ba

HFC Bank Stadium, Suva

=== Group B ===
Pos	Team	Pld	W	D	L	GF	GA	GD	Pts	Qualification
1	TailevuNaitasiri	3	1	2	0	2	1	+1	5	Knockout stage
2	Nadi	3	1	1	1	7	5	+2	4	Knockout stage
3	Labasa	3	0	3	0	4	4	0	3	
4	Rewa	3	0	2	1	3	6	−3	2	

9 June 2023

Rewa	1–1	Labasa

HFC Bank Stadium, Suva
9 June 2023

Nadi	2–2	Tailevu Naitasiri

HFC Bank Stadium, Suva

10 June 2023

Rewa	2–2	Tailevu Naitasiri

HFC Bank Stadium, Suva
10 June 2023

Labasa	4–3	Nadi

HFC Bank Stadium, Suva

11 June 2023

Tailevu Naitasiri	1–0	Labasa

HFC Bank Stadium, Suva
11 June 2023

Nadi	3–0	Rewa

HFC Bank Stadium, Suva

== Knockout stage ==
Semi-finals
17 June
Lautoka FC	7
Nadi FC	0
17 June
TAILEVU NAITASIRI FC	3 (4)
NAVUA FC	3 (5)

Final
18 June
Lautoka FC	1 (3)
Navua FC	1 (2)

=== Semi-finals ===
17 June 2023

Lautoka FC	7–0	Nadi FC

17 June 2023

Tailevu Naitasiri FC	3–3	Navua FC

=== Final ===
18 June 2023

Lautoka FC	1–1 (a.e.t.)	Navua FC
