= Women's football in Algeria =

Overview of football in Algeria

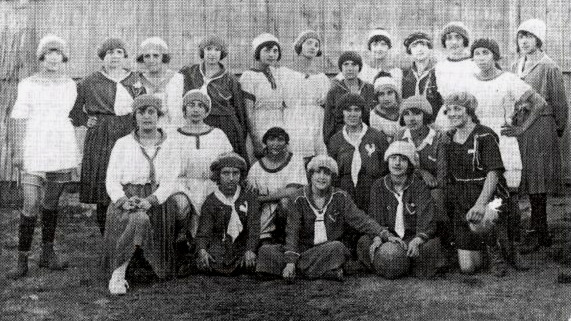
- Teams AS Alger and GC Oran, in 1921
- Country: Algeria
- Governing body: FAF
- National team: Algeria
- First played: 1921
- Clubs: +40

National competitions
- FIFA Women's World Cup; Africa Women Cup of Nations; UNAF Women's Tournament; Arab Women's Cup

Club competitions
- List: League: W-Championship W-Championship D2; Cups: W-Cup W-League Cup W-Super Cup

International competitions
- FIFA Women's Club World Cup; CAF Women's Champions League; UNAF Women's Club Tournament

Women's football in Algeria is a popular sport in Algeria. It's run by the Ligue du Football Féminin under the auspices of the Algerian Football Federation.

== History ==
The first women's football match in Algeria took place in the French Algeria era on 8 May 1921 during an Algiers exhibition day. The match was between the women's sections of two senior clubs, Association Sportive Algéroise and Gallia Club Oranais, in the Exposition Stadium in Algiers.

After Algerian independence in 1962, women's clubs had been dissolved. In 1975, COS Tiaret was the first women club created under the era of independent Algeria. And in the 1990s, many other clubs was founded.

The first Algerian women's championship was created in 1998 under the regional leagues format. In 2008, a national league of two divisions was created (D1 and D2) under the auspices of the Ligue Nationale du Football (LNF) and on 25 June 2013, the Ligue du football féminin (LFF) was created.

== See also ==
- Football in Algeria
