= Women's association football in New Zealand =

Women's football in New Zealand
- Country: New Zealand
- Governing body: New Zealand Football
- National team: Women's national team

Club competitions
- National Women's League

International competitions
- Olympics (national team); FIFA Women's World Cup (national team); OFC Women's Nations Cup (national team)

Audience records
- Single match: 42,137 New Zealand vs Norway

Association football in New Zealand is one of the fastest growing and most popular sports amongst women. The National Women's League was created in 2002 in order to help improve the New Zealand women's national football team. New Zealand Football is now focusing its efforts on youth development so the country can be internationally competitive.

== History ==
The earliest development of women's football begun in 1973. The 2023 FIFA Women's World Cup was hosted in New Zealand.

== Governing Board ==
The Women's Soccer Association of New Zealand (WSANZ) used to have sole control of the women's game in New Zealand it merged after becoming part of the national body, New Zealand Football.

WSANZ has disbanded its organisation and operates under New Zealand Football. New Zealand Football is the governs women's football in the country.

== Domestic League ==
The National Women's League is the top tier professional Women's football league in New Zealand.

== National team ==
The women's team's greatest international achievement was to win 1975 AFC Women's Championship. The national team has never reached the second round of the World Cup. OFC Women's Nations Cup is used as a qualifier for the world cup

== See also ==
- Association football in New Zealand
- New Zealand women's national football team
- National Women's League
- Record attendances for women's football (soccer)
