= Women's football in Madagascar =

Overview of women's football in Seychelles

- Country: Madagascar
- Governing body: Malagasy Football Federation
- National team(s): Women's national team
- Registered players: 1065 (as of 2006)
- Clubs: 22 (as of 2009)

Women's football in Madagascar faces several development problems inside the country including a lack of popularity for the sport, and few female players and teams. Women have gained football leadership positions in the country with one coaching a men's team and another umpiring international matches. There are other development issues for the sport that are ones facing the whole of Africa.

== Background and development ==
Early development of the women's game at the time colonial powers brought football to the continent was limited as colonial powers in the region tended to take make concepts of patriarchy and women's participation in sport with them to local cultures that had similar concepts already embedded in them. The lack of later development of the national team on a wider international level symptomatic of all African teams is a result of several factors, including limited access to education, poverty amongst women in the wider society, and fundamental inequality present in the society that occasionally allows for female specific human rights abuses. When quality female football players are developed, they tend to leave for greater opportunities abroad. Continent wide, funding is also an issue, with most development money coming from FIFA, not the national football association. Future, success for women's football in Africa is dependent on improved facilities and access by women to these facilities. Attempting to commercialise the game and make it commercially viable is not the solution, as demonstrated by the current existence of many youth and women's football camps held throughout the continent.

Malagasy Football Federation was founded in 1961 and became a FIFA affiliate in 1964. Women's football is required on the board by a wider mandate though the organisation does not employee any full-time employees to look after women's football.

Football ranks as the eighth most popular women's sport in the country, trailing behind basketball, which is the most popular. The popularity of rugby union as a woman's participation sport also challenges football. In the nation's capital, there are ten women's rugby union club teams. This siphons off potential players from football. A women's football programme was organised in the country in 2000. In 2006, there were 1,065 registered female football players, 340 adults players and 725 youth players. This was an increase from 2000 when there were 800 registered female players, and the 210 total registered players in 2002. In 2006, there were 91 women only football clubs in the country. Women's football was gaining popularity during the late 2000s. By 2009, the total number of women's clubs was 22 senior teams and 38 youth teams. Futsal is played by women in the country, with 80 unregistered female futsal players playing in 2006.

== National youth teams ==
=== U20 team ===
Madagascar women's national under-20 team were supposed to have participated in the African Women U-20 Championship 2006, opening against Senegal but the team withdrew from the tournament. Still, the team played in three games in 2005. In 2006, the team had two training sessions a week. In 2009, the team still had FIFA recognition. They competed in the African Women U-20 World Cup 2010 Qualifying. In the first leg, they lost to Reunion 1–3. In the second leg, they lost 1–4.

== See also ==
- Football in Madagascar
