= 2023 FA Vase final =

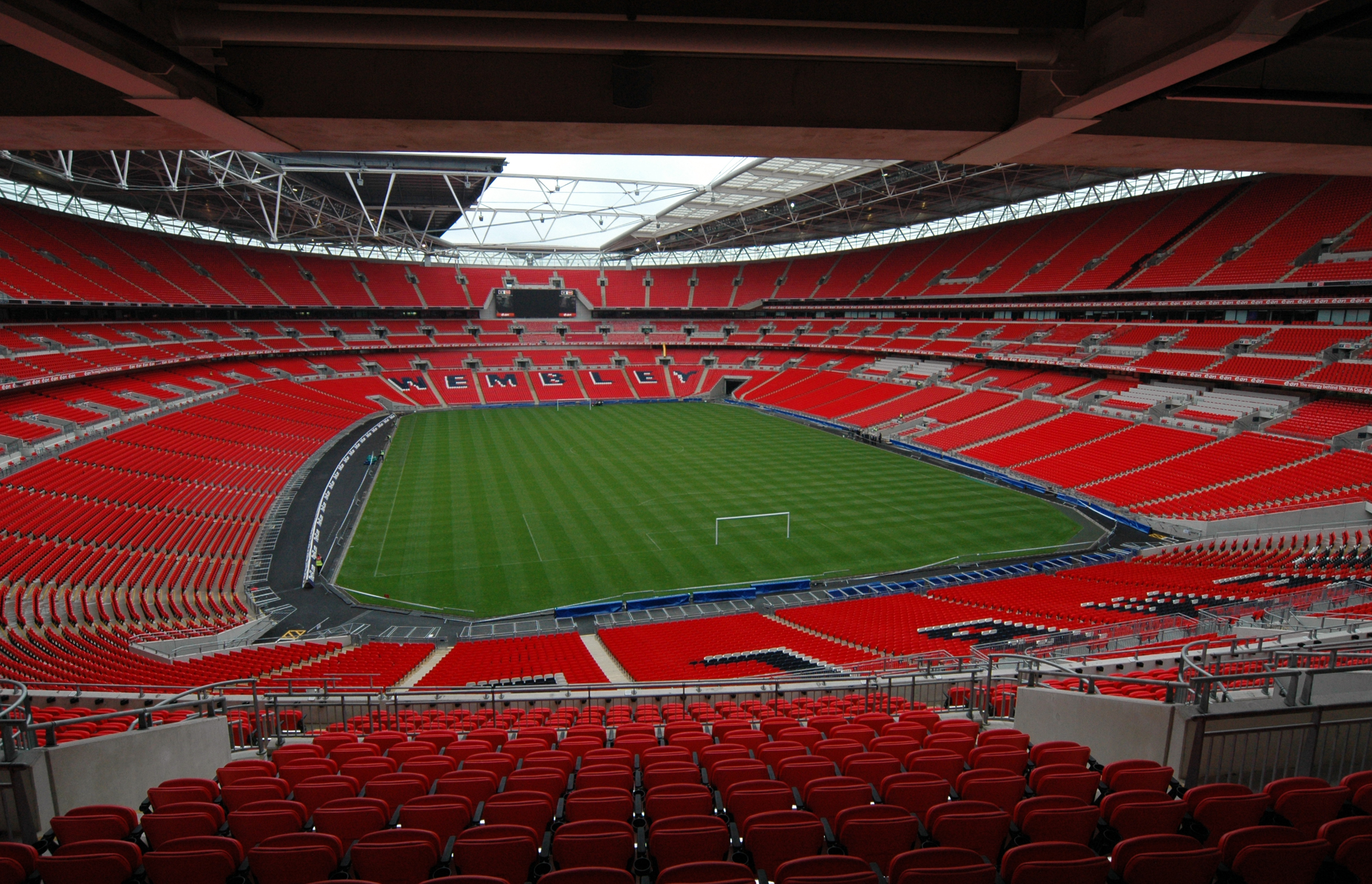
- Wembley Stadium hosted the final
- Event: 2022–23 FA Vase
Ascot United	Newport Pagnell Town
1	0
- Date: 21 May 2023
- Venue: Wembley Stadium, London

The 2023 FA Vase final was the 49th final of the Football Association's cup competition for teams at levels 9–11 of the English football league system. The match was contested between Ascot United of the Combined Counties League Premier Division North and Newport Pagnell Town of the United Counties League Premier Division South. Newport Pagnell Town entered the game as the defending champions, reaching the final for the second successive season. Ascot United were appearing in their first final.

As part of Non-League Finals Day, the final of the FA Trophy was played on the same day at the same venue. Both matches were televised in the UK on BT Sport.

== Route to the Final ==
=== Ascot United ===
27 August 2022 First Qualifying Round	Long Crendon	1–5	Ascot United	Marston
15:00 BST				Stadium: Marsh Lane

24 September 2022 Second Qualifying Round	Ascot United	10–1	AEK Boco	Ascot
15:00 BST				Stadium: Ascot Racecourse

22 October 2022 First Round	Newport (IOW)	0–1	Ascot United	Ryde
15:00 BST				Stadium: Smallbrook Stadium; Attendance: 152

12 November 2022 Second Round	Broadbridge Heath	0–3	Ascot United	Broadbridge Heath
15:00 GMT				Stadium: High Wood Hill Sports Ground; Attendance: 237

3 December 2022 Third Round	Ascot United	4–0	Little Common	Ascot
15:00 GMT				Stadium: Ascot Racecourse; Attendance: 107

28 January 2023 Fourth Round	Buckland Athletic	1–3	Ascot United	Newton Abbot
15:00 GMT				Stadium: Homers Heath; Attendance: 212

11 February 2023 Fifth Round	Bridgwater United	0–1	Ascot United	Bridgwater
15:00 GMT				Stadium: Fairfax Park; Attendance: 429

11 March 2023 Quarter-Final	West Didsbury & Chorlton	1–1 (3–4 p)	Ascot United	Chorlton-cum-Hardy
15:00 GMT				Stadium: Brookburn Road; Attendance: 1,320

1 April 2023 Semi-Final	Corsham Town	2–2 (4–5 p)	Ascot United	Corsham
15:00 BST				Stadium: Southbank; Attendance: 1,736

=== Newport Pagnell Town ===
13 November 2022 Second Round	Baldock Town	1–4	Newport Pagnell Town	Arlesey
15:00 GMT				Stadium: Hitchin Road; Attendance: 223

3 December 2022 Third Round	Norwich United	0–1	Newport Pagnell Town	Blofield
15:00 GMT				Stadium: Plantation Park; Attendance: 227

28 January 2023 Fourth Round	Newport Pagnell Town	1–1 (7–6 p)	Leighton Town	Newport Pagnell
15:00 GMT				Stadium: Willen Road; Attendance: 1,435

11 February 2023 Fifth Round	Newport Pagnell Town	1–0	Jersey Bulls	Newport Pagnell
15:00 GMT				Stadium: Willen Road; Attendance: 990

11 March 2023 Quarter-Final	Newport Pagnell Town	2–2 (4–3 p)	Atherstone Town	Newport Pagnell
15:00 GMT				Stadium: Willen Road; Attendance: 1,501

1 April 2023 Semi-Final	Congleton Town	2–2 (2–3 p)	Newport Pagnell Town	Congleton
15:00 BST				Stadium: Cleric Stadium; Attendance: 1,436

== Match ==
=== Details ===
21 May 2023
12:15 BST

Ascot United	1–0	Newport Pagnell Town
Walters 79'	Report

Wembley Stadium, London

Man of the match: Sean McCormack (Ascot United)

Match officials

- Referee: Anthony Backhouse
- Assistant referees:
- Fourth official:
