= 2020–21 Moldovan Women's Cup =

Tournament details
- Country: Moldova
- Teams: 8

Final positions
- Champions: Narta Drăsliceni
- Runners-up: Maksimum Cahul

Tournament statistics
- Matches played: 13
- Goals scored: 37 (2.85 per match)

The 2020–21 Moldovan Women's Cup (Romanian: Cupa Moldovei la fotbal feminin) was the 24th season of the Moldovan annual football tournament. The competition started on 21 October 2020 and concluded with the final held on 10 June 2021. A total of eight teams had their entries to the tournament.

== Quarter-finals ==
The home teams in the first legs and the pairs were determined in a draw held on 7 October 2020. The first legs were played on 21 October 2020 and the second legs on 18 November 2020 and 28 April 2021.

=== First legs ===
| 21 October 2020 | Maksimum Cahul | 0–1 | Belceanka Bălți | Cahul |
| 14:00 EEST | | | O. Bujor 68' | Stadium: Atlant Stadium; Referee: Igor Boșca |

| 21 October 2020 | Legia Tiraspol | 1–1 | Nistru Cioburciu | Tiraspol |
| 15:00 EEST | D. Stița 12' | | V. Zdorovețchi 48' | Stadium: Municipal Stadium; Referee: Mihail Cracovschi |

| 21 October 2020 | Narta Drăsliceni | 1–0 | Real Succes Chișinău | Drăsliceni |
| 15:00 EEST | A. Arhirii 12' | | | Stadium: Drăsliceni Stadium; Referee: Radu Tobultoc |

| 21 October 2020 | Noroc Nimoreni | 0–4 | Agarista Anenii Noi | Nimoreni |
| 15:00 EEST | | | C. Vasilachi 4'; Musteață 17' (pen.); M. Gamarț 73'; Chirica 78' | Stadium: Nimoreni Stadium; Referee: Valeriu Minciună |

=== Second legs ===
| 18 November 2020 | Nistru Cioburciu | 3–0 (4–1 agg.) | Legia Tiraspol | Cioburciu |
| 13:00 EET | Cojuhari 10', 59' (pen.); V. Zdorovețchi 71' | | | Stadium: Cioburciu Stadium |

| 18 November 2020 | Real Succes Chișinău | 2–1 (2–2 a agg.) | Narta Drăsliceni | Chișinău |
| 13:00 EET | E. Railean 60'; D. Chicu 78' | | A. Bîrcă 58' | Stadium: Real Succes Stadium |

| 18 November 2020 | Belceanka Bălți | 0–2 (1–2 agg.) | Maksimum Cahul | Bălți |
| 13:00 EET | | | B. Cabac 47', 48' | Stadium: ȘS Bălți Stadium |

| 28 April 2021 | Agarista Anenii Noi | 4–1 (8–1 agg.) | Noroc Nimoreni | Anenii Noi |
| 16:00 EEST | C. Vasilachi 8', 29'; Chirica 53'; Druță 87' | | A. Costin 44' | Stadium: Anenii Noi Stadium |

== Semi-finals ==
The first legs were played on 12 May 2021 and the second legs on 26 May 2021.

=== First legs ===
| 12 May 2021 | Nistru Cioburciu | 2–2 | Narta Drăsliceni | Cioburciu |
| 14:00 EEST | S. Donțu 77'; A. Bîrcă 87' (o.g.) | | A. Arhirii 26' (pen.); A. Cornițel 72' | Stadium: Cioburciu Stadium; Referee: Oxana Cruc |

| 12 May 2021 | Maksimum Cahul | 2–0 | Agarista Anenii Noi | Cahul |
| 14:00 EEST | V. Vîrlan 23'; Colnic 42' | | | Stadium: Atlant Stadium; Referee: Petru Stoianov |

=== Second legs ===
| 26 May 2021 | Narta Drăsliceni | 3–1 (5–3 agg.) | Nistru Cioburciu | Ratuș |
| 16:00 EEST | A. Bîrcă 38', 90'; A. Cornițel 44' | | V. Zdorovețchi 70' | Stadium: Ratuș Stadium |

| 26 May 2021 | Agarista Anenii Noi | 2–1 (2–3 agg.) | Maksimum Cahul | Anenii Noi |
| 16:00 EEST | Musteață 33' (pen.); M. Gamarț 90+4' | | Colnic 89' | Stadium: Anenii Noi Stadium |

== Final ==
The final was played on Thursday 10 June 2021 at the Zimbru Stadium in Chișinău. The "home" team (for administrative purposes) was determined by an additional draw held on 28 May 2021.

10 June 2021
20:00 EEST

| Narta Drăsliceni | 2–1 | Maksimum Cahul |
|---|---|---|
| A. Bîrcă 28'; A. Arhirii 41' | Report | Colnic 12' |

Zimbru Stadium, Chișinău
Referee: Oxana Cruc
