= 2022–23 Moldovan Women's Cup =

Tournament details
- Country: Moldova
- Teams: 7

Final positions
- Champions: Agarista Anenii Noi
- Runners-up: Noroc Nimoreni

Tournament statistics
- Matches played: 11
- Goals scored: 45 (4.09 per match)

The 2022–23 Moldovan Women's Cup (Romanian: Cupa Moldovei la fotbal feminin) was the 26th season of the Moldovan annual football tournament. The competition started on 9 November 2022 and concluded with the final held on 20 May 2023. A total of seven teams had their entries to the tournament.

== Quarter-finals ==
Nistru Cioburciu received a bye for the quarter-finals.

Team 1	Agg.	Team 2	1st leg	2nd leg
Rainier Drăsliceni	1–0	Belceanka Bălți	1–0	0–0
Noroc Nimoreni	10–3	Real Succes	4–1	6–2
Legia Tiraspol	1–10	Agarista Anenii Noi	1–4	0–6

=== Matches ===
9 November 2022

Rainier Drăsliceni	1–0	Belceanka Bălți
Cornițel 18'

Ratuș
16 November 2022

Belceanka Bălți	0–0	Rainier Drăsliceni

Bălți

9 November 2022

Noroc Nimoreni	4–1	Real Succes
Său 17', 19', 50'; Colnic 75'		Tataru 28'

Nimoreni
16 November 2022

Real Succes	2–6	Noroc Nimoreni
Andrieș 49'; Tez 70'		Colnic 1', 31'; Vlas 14'; Goroncioi 28'; Său 63', 82'

Chișinău

9 November 2022

Legia Tiraspol	1–4	Agarista Anenii Noi
Terentiev 88'		Gamarț 4'; Șevcenco 14' (o.g.); Bîrca 45', 68'

Tiraspol
16 November 2022

Agarista Anenii Noi	6–0	Legia Tiraspol
Ceban 9'; Bîrca 21', 28'; Musteață 23'; Gamarț 59'; Smirnova 61' (o.g.)

Anenii Noi

== Semi-finals ==
The first legs were played on 15 March 2023 and the second legs on 19 April 2023.

Team 1	Agg.	Team 2	1st leg	2nd leg
Rainier Drăsliceni	1–5	Noroc Nimoreni	0–2	1–3
Nistru Cioburciu	3–7	Agarista Anenii Noi	1–4	2–3

=== Matches ===
15 March 2023

Rainier Drăsliceni	0–2	Noroc Nimoreni
		Său 10'; Suslova 84'

Chișinău
19 April 2023

Noroc Nimoreni	3–1	Rainier Drăsliceni
Colnic 8', 42'; Drumea 74'		Tonu 11'

Nimoreni

15 March 2023

Nistru Cioburciu	1–4	Agarista Anenii Noi
Donțu 43'		Iurcu 12'; Indycha 45'; Terentiev 58'; Chirica 90+1'

Cioburciu
19 April 2023

Agarista Anenii Noi	3–2	Nistru Cioburciu
Caraman 58', 65'; Lazăr 61' (o.g.)		Lykhovyd 56'; Cocotanova 69'

Anenii Noi

== Final ==
The final was played on Saturday 20 May 2023 at the Zimbru Stadium in Chișinău.

20 May 2023
21:00 EEST

Agarista Anenii Noi	4–0	Noroc Nimoreni
Iurcu 5'; Gamarț 24'; Andone 58'; Terentiev 75'	Report

Zimbru Stadium, Chișinău
Attendance: 1,876
Referee: Elena Gobjilă
