= 2024–25 Moldovan Women's Cup =

Tournament details
- Country: Moldova
- Teams: 4

Final positions
- Champions: Agarista Anenii Noi
- Runners-up: Nistru Cioburciu

Tournament statistics
- Matches played: 17
- Goals scored: 84 (4.94 per match)

The 2024–25 Moldovan Women's Cup (Romanian: Cupa Moldovei la fotbal feminin) was the 28th season of the Moldovan annual football tournament. The competition started on 25 September 2024 and concluded with the final held on 28 May 2025. A total of four teams had their entries to the tournament.

== Preliminary round ==
Pos	Team	Pld	W	D	L	GF	GA	GD	Pts	Qualification	AGA	NIS	REA	ATL
1	Agarista Anenii Noi	6	5	1	0	32	6	+26	16	Semi-finals		1–0	4–0	10–1
2	Nistru Cioburciu	6	2	3	1	10	7	+3	9	Semi-finals	1–1		1–1	2–2
3	Real Succes Pudra	6	2	1	3	12	19	−7	7	Semi-finals	2–10	2–3		4–0
4	Atletico Bălți	6	0	1	5	6	28	−22	1	Semi-finals	2–6	0–3	1–3	

Source: fmf
25 September 2024

Real Succes Pudra	4–0	Atletico Bălți
Myno 19', 30', 39'; Drumea 39'

Chișinău
25 September 2024

Nistru Cioburciu	1–1	Agarista Anenii Noi
Borșci 14'		Musteață 6'

Cioburciu

2 October 2024

Nistru Cioburciu	1–1	Real Succes Pudra
Borșci 65'		Tez 37'

Cioburciu
2 October 2024

Agarista Anenii Noi	10–1	Atletico Bălți
Musteață 4'; Șaitan 6'; Bagrin 21', 27'; Meleca 41', 64'; Brînza 43'; Tataru 63'; Toderaș 70'; Balaban 88'		Braguța 83'

Anenii Noi

30 October 2024

Atletico Bălți	0–3	Nistru Cioburciu
		Macovei 17'; Loghin 22'; Pușcaș 73'

Bălți
30 October 2024

Real Succes Pudra	2–10	Agarista Anenii Noi
Luța 51'; Dragomir 87'		Indycha 10'; Caraman 24', 56', 59', 86', 89'; Chirica 55'; Toma 70'; Druță 71'; Tataru 80'

Chișinău

12 March 2025

Atletico Bălți	1–3	Real Succes Pudra
Gorcea 39'		Veleșcu 22', 37'; Cuțuruba 52'

Bălți
12 March 2025

Agarista Anenii Noi	1–0	Nistru Cioburciu
Toma 63'

Anenii Noi

26 March 2025

Atletico Bălți	2–6	Agarista Anenii Noi
Gorcea 35', 77'		Druță 8'; Bagrin 36'; Mecluș 51' (o.g.); Balaban 52'; Toma 65'; Caraman 86'

Bălți
26 March 2025

Real Succes Pudra	2–3	Nistru Cioburciu
Udrea 49', 56'		Lykhovyd 9', 88'; Incova 40'

Chișinău

16 April 2025

Agarista Anenii Noi	4–0	Real Succes Pudra
Bagrin 21'; Mazur 35', 59'; Toma 89'

Anenii Noi
16 April 2025

Nistru Cioburciu	2–2	Atletico Bălți
Lykhovyd 64'; Emelina 90+5'		Luca 20', 31'

Cioburciu

== Semi-finals ==
14 May 2025

Agarista Anenii Noi	11–0	Atletico Bălți
Maidanscaia 5', 39'; Mazur 16', 18', 45', 55', 90+1'; Osadcii 58'; Toma 63', 78'; Iurcu 80'

Anenii Noi
21 May 2025

Atletico Bălți	0–4	Agarista Anenii Noi
		Maidanscaia 7'; Balaban 22'; Caraman 72'; Mazur 77'

Bălți

14 May 2025

Nistru Cioburciu	4–2	Real Succes Pudra
Malic 40' (o.g.); Incova 42'; Lykhovyd 76'; Cocotanova 79'		Cuțuruba 64'; Tez 73'

Cioburciu
21 May 2025

Real Succes Pudra	0–2	Nistru Cioburciu
		Lykhovyd 24', 74'

Chișinău

== Final ==
The final was played on Wednesday 28 May 2025 at the Nisporeni Stadium in Nisporeni.

28 May 2025
20:00 EEST

Agarista Anenii Noi	1–0	Nistru Cioburciu
Mazur 32'	Report

Nisporeni Stadium, Nisporeni
Referee: Oxana Cruc
