= 2025–26 Moldovan Women's Cup =

Tournament details
- Country: Moldova
- Teams: 5

Final positions
- Champions: Zimbru Chișinău
- Runners-up: Agarista Anenii Noi

Tournament statistics
- Matches played: 25
- Goals scored: 103 (4.12 per match)

The 2025–26 Moldovan Women's Cup (Romanian: Cupa Moldovei la fotbal feminin) was the 29th season of the Moldovan annual football tournament. The competition started on 1 October 2025 and ended on 31 May 2026. A total of five teams had their entries to the tournament.

== Preliminary round ==
Pos	Team	Pld	W	D	L	GF	GA	GD	Pts	Qualification	ZIM	AGA	REA	NIS	TIR
1	Zimbru Chișinău	8	7	0	1	24	4	+20	21 (Note: Zimbru ahead of Agarista on head-to-head goal difference.)	Semi-finals		3–1	6–0	1–0	3–0
2	Agarista Anenii Noi	8	7	0	1	39	5	+34	21	Semi-finals	2–1		6–1	4–0	11–0
3	Real Succes-ȘS-11 Chișinău	8	4	0	4	14	26	−12	12	Semi-finals	0–4 (Note: Zimbru hosted)	0–10 (Note: Agarista hosted)		5–0	2–0
4	RSDUȘOR Nistru-Cioburciu	8	1	0	7	3	18	−15	3 (Note: Nistru ahead of ȘS-4 on head-to-head away goals scored.)	Semi-finals	1–2	0–2	0–2		1–0
5	ȘS-4 Tiraspol	8	1	0	7	2	29	−27	3		0–4	0–3	0–4	2–1	

Source: fmf
Rules for classification: 1) Points; 2) Head-to-head points; 3) Head-to-head goal difference; 4) Head-to-head away goals scored; 5) Head-to-head goals scored; 6) Matches won; 7) Goal difference; 8) Goals scored; 9) Least red cards; 10) Least yellow cards; 11) Drawing of lots

== Semi-finals ==
29 April 2026	Zimbru Chișinău	7–0	RSDUȘOR Nistru-Cioburciu	Chișinău
	Polina Mazur 16'; Sofiia Dobrovolska 26'; Iuliana Colnic 27', 46'; Mihaela Gamarț 59'; Maria Ceban 84'; Tatiana Balaban 89' (pen.)

6 May 2026	RSDUȘOR Nistru-Cioburciu	0–5 (0–12 agg.)	Zimbru Chișinău	Cioburciu
			Maria Ceban 56'; Polina Mazur 59'; Adela Borșci 61'; Iuliana Colnic 70'; Mihaela Gamarț 87'

29 April 2026	Agarista Anenii Noi	2–1	Real Succes-ȘS-11 Chișinău	Anenii Noi
	Milena Tihonciuc 62'; Ludmila Caraman 87' (pen.)		Elisaveta Botezatu 68'

6 May 2026	Real Succes-ȘS-11 Chișinău	0–4 (1–6 agg.)	Agarista Anenii Noi	Chișinău
			Milena Tihonciuc 5'; Corina Vasilache 48', 81'; Anastasia Toma 68'

== Final ==
The final was played on Sunday 31 May 2026 at the Zimbru Stadium in Chișinău.

31 May 2026
18:00 EEST

Agarista Anenii Noi	0–2	Zimbru Chișinău
	Report	Iuliana Colnic 61'; Adela Borșci 79'

Zimbru Stadium, Chișinău
Referee: Elena Gobjila
