= 2014–15 Moldovan Women's Cup =

Cupa Moldovei la Femei

Tournament details
- Country: Moldova
- Teams: 6

The 2014–15 Moldovan Women's Cup is the 18th edition of the Moldovan annual football tournament. The competition began on 9 October 2014 with the Preliminary Round and will end with the final held in May 2015.

== Preliminary round ==
Matches took place on 9 October and 23 October 2014. Two teams have a bye to the semi-finals.

9 October 2014

ȘS Bălți	1-2	FC Narta ŞS Drăsliceni

6 November 2014

FC Narta ŞS Drăsliceni	3-0	ȘS Bălți

9 October 2014

LTPS nr.2-Academia Nimoreni	0-2	PGU ȘS-4-FC Alga Tiraspol

23 October 2014

PGU ȘS-4-FC Alga Tiraspol	1-1	LTPS nr.2-Academia Nimoreni

== Semi-finals ==
Played on 7 May and 21 May 2015.

7 May 2015

FC Narta ŞS Drăsliceni	0–7	CS Noroc Nimoreni

21 May 2015

CS Noroc Nimoreni	2–1	FC Narta ŞS Drăsliceni

7 May 2015

PGU ŞS4-FC Alga Tiraspol	0–0	Real Succes-ŞS 11

21 May 2015

Real Succes-ŞS 11	0–3	PGU ŞS4-FC Alga Tiraspol

== Final ==
7 June 2015

CS Noroc Nimoreni	1-1 [pen. 2-4]	PGU ŞS4-FC Alga Tiraspol
Miron 69'	Report (in Romanian)	Ţabur 55'
Penalties
Vutcariov (penalty missed); Andone (penalty scored); Prisăcari (penalty scored); Cerescu (penalty missed)	2–4	(penalty missed) Miţul; (penalty scored) Bocancea; (penalty scored) Şapovalenco; (penalty scored) Colesnicenco; (penalty scored) Stoianova

Stadionul CPSM
Referee: Vera Onica
