= 2021–22 Moldovan Women's Cup =

Tournament details
- Country: Moldova
- Teams: 7

Final positions
- Champions: Agarista Anenii Noi
- Runners-up: Noroc Nimoreni

Tournament statistics
- Matches played: 12
- Goals scored: 37 (3.08 per match)

The 2021–22 Moldovan Women's Cup (Romanian: Cupa Moldovei la fotbal feminin) was the 25th season of the Moldovan annual football tournament. The competition started on 13 October 2021 and concluded with the final held on 4 June 2022. A total of seven teams had their entries to the tournament.

== Group stage ==
=== Group A ===
Pos	Team	Pld	W	D	L	GF	GA	GD	Pts	Qualification	AGA	REA	MAK	LEG
1	Agarista Anenii Noi	3	2	1	0	7	3	+4	7	Semi-finals		2–2	—	—
2	Real Succes	3	1	1	1	3	6	−3	4	Semi-finals	—		1–0	—
3	Maksimum Cahul	3	1	0	2	2	3	−1	3		1–2	—		1–0
4	Legia Tiraspol	3	1	0	2	4	4	0	3		0–3	4–0	—	

Source: fmf
13 October 2021

Agarista Anenii Noi	2–2	Real Succes
Catarău 6'; Indycha 45'		Tez 56', 58'

Chișinău
13 October 2021

Maksimum Cahul	1–0	Legia Tiraspol
Colnic 77'

Cahul

3 November 2021

Real Succes	1–0	Maksimum Cahul
Tataru 74'

Chișinău
3 November 2021

Legia Tiraspol	0–3	Agarista Anenii Noi
		Său 29', 49'; Maidanscaia 80'

Tiraspol

17 November 2021

Maksimum Cahul	1–2	Agarista Anenii Noi
Tonu 81'		Indycha 68'; Său 83'

Cahul
17 November 2021

Legia Tiraspol	4–0	Real Succes
Niculina 56', 65', 83'; Osadcii 85'

Tiraspol

=== Group B ===
Pos	Team	Pld	W	D	L	GF	GA	GD	Pts	Qualification	NOR	BEL	NAR
1	Noroc Nimoreni	1	1	0	0	2	1	+1	3	Semi-finals		2–1	—
2	Belceanka Bălți	1	0	0	1	1	2	−1	0	Semi-finals	—		—
3	Narta Drăsliceni	0	0	0	0	0	0	0	0	withdrew	~~0–6~~	—	

Source: fmf
~~13 October 2021~~

~~Narta Drăsliceni~~	~~0–6~~	~~Noroc Nimoreni~~
		~~Golan 14', 39', 84'~~; ~~Moisiuc 58'~~; ~~Vlas 79'~~; ~~Burlacu 86'~~

~~Ratuș~~

3 November 2021

Noroc Nimoreni	2–1	Belceanka Bălți
Bordeniuc 66' (o.g.); Arhirii 68'		Coceanovschi 36'

Nimoreni

~~17 November 2021~~

~~Belceanka Bălți~~	~~–~~	~~Narta Drăsliceni~~

~~Bălți~~

== Semi-finals ==
Team 1	Agg.	Team 2	1st leg	2nd leg
Agarista Anenii Noi	9–0	Belceanka Bălți	4–0	5–0
Noroc Nimoreni	5–1	Real Succes	4–0	1–1

=== Matches ===
18 May 2022

Agarista Anenii Noi	4–0	Belceanka Bălți
Musteață 10', 28'; Gamarț 74'; Său 88'

Anenii Noi
25 May 2022

Belceanka Bălți	0–5	Agarista Anenii Noi
		Musteață 20', 42'; Railean 34'; Său 75'; Peșterean 83'

Bălți

18 May 2022

Noroc Nimoreni	4–0	Real Succes
Vlas 6'; Golan 36'; Bădiceanu 89'; Arhirii 90'

Nimoreni
25 May 2022

Real Succes	1–1	Noroc Nimoreni
Dragomir 75'		Moisiuc 25'

Chișinău

== Final ==
The final was played on Saturday 4 June 2022 at the Nisporeni Stadium in Nisporeni.

4 June 2022
19:00 EEST

Agarista Anenii Noi	3–0	Noroc Nimoreni
Său 6', 36'; Druță 21'	Report

Nisporeni Stadium, Nisporeni
Referee: Oxana Cruc
