= 2019–20 Moldovan Women's Cup =

Tournament details
- Country: Moldova
- Teams: 8

Final positions
- Champions: Agarista-ȘS Anenii Noi
- Runners-up: ȘS Ciobruciu-GTC

Tournament statistics
- Matches played: 11
- Goals scored: 39 (3.55 per match)

The 2019–20 Moldovan Women's Cup (Romanian: Cupa Moldovei la fotbal feminin) was the 23rd season of the Moldovan annual football tournament. The competition started on 17 November 2019 and concluded with the final held on 19 August 2020. A total of eight teams had their entries to the tournament.

== Quarter-finals ==
=== First legs ===
17 November 2019	ȘS Ciobruciu-GTC	1–1	Noroc Nimoreni	Cioburciu
13:00 EET				Stadium: Cioburciu Stadium

17 November 2019	Agarista-ȘS Anenii Noi	3–1	Maksimum Cahul	Anenii Noi
13:00 EET				Stadium: Sport Stadium

17 November 2019	ȘS 11-Real Succes	3–1	Belceanka Bălți	Chișinău
14:00 EET				Stadium: Real Succes

17 November 2019	PGU ȘS4-Alga Tiraspol	2–0	Narta-ȘS Drăsliceni	Tiraspol
14:00 EET				Stadium: Municipal ȘS4

=== Second legs ===
23 November 2019	Noroc Nimoreni	2–2	ȘS Ciobruciu-GTC	Nimoreni
13:00 EET				Stadium: Nimoreni Stadium

23 November 2019	Maksimum Cahul	0–1	Agarista-ȘS Anenii Noi	Cahul
13:00 EET				Stadium: Atlant Stadium

23 November 2019	Narta-ȘS Drăsliceni	2–1	PGU ȘS4-Alga Tiraspol	Ratuș
13:00 EET				Stadium: Ratuș Stadium

30 November 2019	Belceanka Bălți	3–2	ȘS 11-Real Succes	Bălți
13:00 EET				Stadium: ȘS Bălți

== Semi-finals ==
=== First legs ===
Agarista-ȘS Anenii Noi	3–0 (Note: Alga withdrew. Awarded a 3-0 technical victory to Agarista.)	PGU ȘS4-Alga Tiraspol

5 August 2020	ȘS Ciobruciu-GTC	8–1	ȘS 11-Real Succes	Cioburciu
17:00 EEST				Stadium: Cioburciu Stadium

=== Second legs ===
PGU ȘS4-Alga Tiraspol	0–3	Agarista-ȘS Anenii Noi

9 August 2020	ȘS 11-Real Succes	1–1	ȘS Ciobruciu-GTC	Chișinău
18:00 EEST				Stadium: Real Succes

== Final ==
The final was played on 19 August 2020 at the Zimbru Stadium in Chișinău.

19 August 2020
20:00 EEST

ȘS Ciobruciu-GTC	1–2	Agarista-ȘS Anenii Noi
Tonu 47'	Report	Andone 80'; Vasilachi 90+2'

Zimbru Stadium, Chișinău
Referee: Natalia Clipca
