= 2023–24 Moldovan Women's Cup =

Tournament details
- Country: Moldova
- Teams: 5

Final positions
- Champions: Agarista Anenii Noi
- Runners-up: Real Succes Pudra

Tournament statistics
- Matches played: 7
- Goals scored: 35 (5 per match)

The 2023–24 Moldovan Women's Cup (Romanian: Cupa Moldovei la fotbal feminin) was the 27th season of the Moldovan annual football tournament. The competition started on 27 March 2024 and concluded with the final held on 8 May 2024. A total of five teams had their entries to the tournament.

== Quarter-final ==
=== First leg ===
27 March 2024	Belceanka Bălți	1–2	Chișinău	Fălești
13:00 EET	Moisiuc 33'		Myno 53'; Ciobanu 87'	Stadium: Fălești Stadium

=== Second leg ===
17 April 2024	Chișinău	1–0 (3–1 agg.)	Belceanka Bălți	Chișinău
16:00 EEST	Ciobanu 23'			Stadium: Petru Zadnipru

== Semi-finals ==
=== First legs ===
24 April 2024	Noroc Nimoreni	0–6	Real Succes Pudra	Nimoreni
16:00 EEST			Șeicaș 5', 20', 76'; Lanciu 25' (o.g.); Tataru 70'; Meșină 86' (o.g.)	Stadium: Nimoreni Stadium

24 April 2024	Agarista Anenii Noi	6–0	Chișinău	Anenii Noi
16:00 EEST	Caraman 25', 62', 77'; Bagrin 64'; Peșterean 70', 83'			Stadium: Anenii Noi Stadium

=== Second legs ===
1 May 2024	Real Succes Pudra	6–2 (12–2 agg.)	Noroc Nimoreni	Chișinău
16:00 EEST	Seicaș 2', 24', 40', 76'; Tez 40'; Tataru 86'		Golan 61'; Miron 73'	Stadium: Real Succes

1 May 2024	Chișinău	0–6 (0–12 agg.)	Agarista Anenii Noi	Chișinău
16:00 EEST			Chirica 52', 84'; Caraman 56'; Railean 64'; Druță 74'; Trofimov 82'	Stadium: Petru Zadnipru

== Final ==
The final was played on Wednesday 8 May 2024 at the Zimbru Stadium in Chișinău.

8 May 2024
17:00 EEST

Agarista Anenii Noi	5–0	Real Succes Pudra
Caraman 18', 48' (pen.), 83'; Andone 70'; Bagrin 74'	Report

Zimbru Stadium, Chișinău
Attendance: 783
Referee: Elena Gobjilă
