= 2016–17 Moldovan Women's Cup =

Tournament details
- Country: Moldova
- Teams: 7

Final positions
- Champions: ȘS 11-Real Succes
- Runners-up: Belceanka Bălți

Tournament statistics
- Matches played: 11
- Goals scored: 43 (3.91 per match)

The 2016–17 Moldovan Women's Cup (Romanian: Cupa Moldovei la fotbal feminin) was the 20th season of the Moldovan annual football tournament. The competition started on 2 November 2016 and concluded with the final at the CPSM Stadium on 8 June 2017. A total of seven teams had their entries to the tournament.

== Quarter-finals ==
Belceanka Bălți received a bye for the quarter-finals.
Teams in bold continue to the next round of the competition.

=== First legs ===
2 November 2016	ȘS 11-Real Succes	**1–0**	PGU ȘS4-Alga Tiraspol	Chișinău
14:00 EEST				Stadium: Real Succes

3 November 2016	Narta-ȘS Drăsliceni	**2–1**	Maksimum Cahul	Ratuș
14:00 EEST				Stadium: Sătesc

3 November 2016	Noroc Nimoreni	**6–2**	LTPS-2 Chișinău	Nimoreni
14:00 EEST				Stadium: Sătesc

=== Second legs ===
23 November 2016	PGU ȘS4-Alga Tiraspol	**1–1**	**ȘS 11-Real Succes**	Tiraspol
14:00 EEST				Stadium: Municipal ȘS4

23 November 2016	Maksimum Cahul	**1–2**	**Narta-ȘS Drăsliceni**	Cahul
14:00 EEST				Stadium: Raional Atlant

23 November 2016	LTPS-2 Chișinău	**0–4**	**Noroc Nimoreni**	Nimoreni
14:00 EEST				Stadium: Sătesc

== Semi-finals ==
=== First legs ===
18 April 2017	Narta-ȘS Drăsliceni	0–7	ȘS 11-Real Succes	Ratuș
16:00 EEST				Stadium: Sătesc

18 April 2017	Noroc Nimoreni	1–2	Belceanka Bălți	Nimoreni
16:00 EEST				Stadium: Sătesc

=== Second legs ===
26 April 2017	ȘS 11-Real Succes	4–0	Narta-ȘS Drăsliceni	Chișinău
16:00 EEST				Stadium: Real Succes

26 April 2017	Belceanka Bălți	2–2	Noroc Nimoreni	Bălți
16:00 EEST				Stadium: Școlii Sportive

== Final ==
The final was played on 8 June 2017 at the CPSM Stadium in Vadul lui Vodă.

8 June 2017
18:00 EEST

ȘS 11-Real Succes	3–1	Belceanka Bălți
Șoimu 20', 30', 45'	Report	Sivolobova 34'

CPSM Stadium, Vadul lui Vodă
Attendance: 300
Referee: Daniel Luca
