= 2018–19 Moldovan Women's Cup =

Tournament details
- Country: Moldova
- Teams: 9

Final positions
- Champions: Agarista-ȘS Anenii Noi
- Runners-up: Noroc Nimoreni

Tournament statistics
- Matches played: 13
- Goals scored: 52 (4 per match)

The 2018–19 Moldovan Women's Cup (Romanian: Cupa Moldovei la fotbal feminin) was the 22nd season of the Moldovan annual football tournament. The competition started on 17 October 2018 and concluded with the final held on 2 June 2019. A total of nine teams had their entries to the tournament.

== Preliminary round ==
17 October 2018	LTPS-2 Chișinău	1–1 (a.e.t.) (4–2 p)	ȘS Ciobruciu-GTC	Nimoreni
15:00 EEST				Stadium: Stadionul Sătesc; Referee: Denis Ivlev

== Quarter-finals ==
=== First legs ===
31 October 2018	Noroc Nimoreni	5–0	Belceanka Bălți	Nimoreni
14:00 EET				Stadium: Stadionul Sătesc; Referee: Igor Boșca

31 October 2018	LTPS-2 Chișinău	0–6	ȘS 11-Real Succes	Chișinău
14:00 EET				Stadium: Real Succes; Referee: Valeriu Minciună

31 October 2018	Alga Tiraspol	1–3	Agarista-ȘS Anenii Noi	Tiraspol
14:00 EET				Stadium: Municipal ȘS4

31 October 2018	Narta-ȘS Drăsliceni	0–1	Maksimum Cahul	Ratuș
14:00 EET				Stadium: Stadionul Sătesc; Referee: Vitalie Cobzac

=== Second legs ===
15 November 2018	Belceanka Bălți	2–1	Noroc Nimoreni	Bălți
13:00 EET				Stadium: Școlii Sportive

15 November 2018	ȘS 11-Real Succes	10–0	LTPS-2 Chișinău	Chișinău
14:00 EET				Stadium: Real Succes

15 November 2018	Agarista-ȘS Anenii Noi	7–0	Alga Tiraspol	Anenii Noi
14:00 EET				Stadium: Stadionul Sport

15 November 2018	Maksimum Cahul	2–0	Narta-ȘS Drăsliceni	Cahul
14:00 EET				Stadium: Stadionul Atlant

== Semi-finals ==
=== First legs ===
3 April 2019	Noroc Nimoreni	0–0	ȘS 11-Real Succes	Nimoreni
15:00 EEST				Stadium: Stadionul Sătesc

3 April 2019	Maksimum Cahul	3–0	Agarista-ȘS Anenii Noi	Cahul
16:00 EEST				Stadium: Stadionul Atlant

=== Second legs ===
24 April 2019	ȘS 11-Real Succes	2–2	Noroc Nimoreni	Chișinău
15:00 EEST				Stadium: Real Succes

24 April 2019	Agarista-ȘS Anenii Noi	4–0	Maksimum Cahul	Anenii Noi
15:00 EEST				Stadium: Stadionul Sport

== Final ==
The final was played on 2 June 2019 at the Municipal Stadium in Hîncești.

2 June 2019
19:00 EEST

Agarista-ȘS Anenii Noi	3–1	Noroc Nimoreni
Mereuță 16'; Vasilachi 41'; Andone 90+5'	Report	Golan 25'

Municipal Stadium, Hîncești
Attendance: 700
Referee: Natalia Clipca
