= 2026–27 Moldovan Women's League =

Liga Națională
- Season: 2026–27
- Top goalscorer: Iuliana Colnic (Zimbru); 20 goals

The 2026–27 Moldovan Women's League is the 27th season of the highest women's football league in Moldova. The competition started on 27 August 2026 and will end in May 2027.

== Teams ==
Location of teams in 2026–27 Liga Națională

Club	Location	Ground	Turf
Agarista	Anenii Noi	Anenii Noi Stadium	Artificial
Dacia Buiucani	Chișinău	ArtSport Arena	Artificial
Iskra	Rîbnița	Sîngerei Stadium (Sîngerei) (Note: Real Succes Stadium in Chișinău used as home ground in 1 match.)	Natural
Real Succes-Sireți	Chișinău	Real Succes	Artificial
Zimbru	Chișinău	Zimbru-2 Stadium	Natural

== Format ==
Clubs will play each other six times for a total of 24 matches per team.

== League table ==
Pos	Team	Pld	W	D	L	GF	GA	GD	Pts	Qualification
1	Zimbru Chișinău	12	12	0	0	72	4	+68	36	Qualification to Champions League first qualifying round
2	Agarista Anenii Noi	10	7	0	3	43	14	+29	21	
3	Real Succes-Sireți	8	4	0	4	15	14	+1	12	
4	Dacia Buiucani	10	1	1	8	5	56	−51	4	
5	Iskra Rîbnița	10	0	1	9	4	51	−47	1	

Updated to match(es) played on 22 November 2026. Source: FMF
Rules for classification: 1) Points; 2) Play-off (only if deciding champion when two teams tied); 3) Head-to-head points; 4) Head-to-head goal difference; 5) Head-to-head goals scored; 6) Matches won; 7) Goal difference; 8) Goals scored; 9) Least red cards; 10) Least yellow cards; 11) Drawing of lots

=== Results ===
Matches 1−24
Home \ Away	AGA	DAC	ISK	REA	ZIM	AGA	DAC	ISK	REA	ZIM	AGA	DAC	ISK	REA	ZIM
Agarista Anenii Noi	—	5–0	7–0	6 Dec	0–2	—	8–1	9–1			—				
Dacia Buiucani	0–7	—	3–1	0–3	0–10		—	9 Dec	16 Dec	13 Dec		—			
Iskra Rîbnița	1–4	0–0	—	1–3	0–5			—	19 Dec	0–9			—		
Real Succes-Sireți	0–2	3–0	4–0	—	1–6	9 Dec		13 Dec	—	1–3				—	
Zimbru Chișinău	8–1	12–1	7–0	2–0	—	1–0	7–0			—					—

Updated to match(es) played on 22 November 2026. Source: FMF (in Romanian)
Legend: Blue = home team win; Yellow = draw; Red = away team win.
