= 2025–26 Moldovan Women's League =

Liga Națională
- Season: 2025–26
- Champions: Zimbru Chișinău
- Champions League: Zimbru Chișinău

The 2025–26 Moldovan Women's League was the 26th season of the highest women's football league in Moldova. The competition started on 17 August 2025 and ended on 27 May 2026.

== Teams ==
Location of teams in 2025–26 Liga Națională

Club	Location
Agarista	Anenii Noi
Nistru	Cioburciu
Real Succes	Chișinău
Zimbru	Chișinău

== Format ==
Clubs will play each other eight times for a total of 24 matches per team.

== League table ==
Pos	Team	Pld	W	D	L	GF	GA	GD	Pts	Qualification
1	Zimbru Chișinău (C)	24	19	2	3	88	16	+72	59	Qualification to Champions League first qualifying round
2	Agarista Anenii Noi	24	19	0	5	91	32	+59	57	
3	Nistru Cioburciu	24	3	4	17	16	82	−66	13	withdrew (Note: Nistru Cioburciu completed the season but withdrew from the league prior to the start of the next season.)
4	Real Succes Chișinău	24	2	4	18	26	91	−65	10	

Source: FMF
Rules for classification: 1) Points; 2) Play-off (only if deciding champion when two teams tied); 3) Head-to-head points; 4) Head-to-head goal difference; 5) Head-to-head goals scored; 6) Matches won; 7) Goal difference; 8) Goals scored; 9) Least red cards; 10) Least yellow cards; 11) Drawing of lots
(C) Champions

=== Results ===
Matches 1−24
Home \ Away	AGA	NIS	REA	ZIM	AGA	NIS	REA	ZIM	AGA	NIS	REA	ZIM	AGA	NIS	REA	ZIM
Agarista Anenii Noi	—	5–0	6–2	1–0	—	5–0	5–3	5–1	—	7–1	6–0	2–5	—	3–1	5–2	0–2
Nistru Cioburciu	1–5	—	1–1	1–1	0–1	—	4–1	0–1	0–9	—	0–0	0–1	3–5	—	0–0 (Note: The match was not played as Real Succes does not show up. However, the match was recorded as a 0–0 technical draw.)	0–3
Real Succes Chișinău	2–10 (Note: Agarista hosted)	1–2 (Note: Nistru hosted)	—	1–4	1–4	5–0	—	1–2	0–1	1–2	—	0–4	1–4	1–0	—	2–2
Zimbru Chișinău	0–1	4–0	9–0	—	2–1	7–0	3–1	—	1–0	11–0	4–0	—	4–0	4–0	13–0	—

Source: FMF (in Romanian)
Legend: Blue = home team win; Yellow = draw; Red = away team win.
