= List of Moldova women's international footballers =

This is a non-exhaustive list of Moldova women's international footballers – association football players who have appeared at least once for the senior Moldova women's national football team.

== Players ==
Key
**Bold**	Named to the national team in the past year

Name	Caps	Goals	National team years	Club(s)
Ludmila Andone	26	3	200?–2018	Unknown
Ana Arnautu	11	0	2015–2020	Unknown
Alexandra Bocancea	2	0	2015	Unknown
Ina Budestean	6	0	2005–2006	Retired
**Ludmila Caraman**	29	1	200?–	(Moldova) Anenii Noi
**Cristina Cerescu**	30	1	2015–	(Romania) Olimpia Cluj
**Claudia Chiper**	28	4	2015–	(Cyprus) Nea Salamis Famagusta
Alina Chirica	1	0	2020–	(Moldova) Anenii Noi
Alexandrina Ciocan	1	0	2015	Unknown
**Veronica Cojuhari**	6	0	2019–	(Moldova) FC Nistru-GTC Ciobruciu
**Nadejda Colesnicenco**	25	1	2015–	(Romania) Fortuna Becicherecu Mic
**Iuliana Colnic**	2	0	2020–	(Moldova) FC Cahul-2005
**Francesca Covali**	2	0	2021–	(Romania) FC Selena ȘN Constanţa
Olga Cușinova	10	0	200?–2018	Unknown
Ștefania Donica	1	0	200?	(Moldova) Anenii Noi
Liuba Dragomir	5	0	2005–2006	Retired
**Bianca Druță**	2	0	2020–	(Moldova) Anenii Noi
**Evghenia Dumic**	1	0	2021–	(Moldova) PGU ȘS4-Legia Tiraspol
Olga Foma	2	0	200?	Retired
Tatiana Frunză	1	0	2006	Retired
Mihaela Guma	2	0	201?	Unknown
Diana Loghin	8	0	201?–201?	Unknown
**Daniela Mardari**	1	0	2018	Rayo Vallecano Femenino
Eugenia Miron	11	1	201?–201?	Unknown
**Violeta Mițul**	19	0	201?–	(Romania) Banat Girls Reșița
**Natalia Munteanu**	17	1	201?–	(Belarus) Dinamo Minsk
**Cristina Musteață**	11	0	200?–	(Moldova) Anenii Noi
Victoria Ostapenco	1	0	20??	Unknown
**Margarita Panova**	5	0	201?–	(Romania) Banat Girls Reșița
Iulia Petelca	4	0	201?–	(Belgium) Charleroi
Elena Porosniuc	20	1	200?–201?	Retired
**Dumitrița Prisăcari**	20	0	201?–	(Romania) Piros Security
**Eugenia Railean**	3	0	2020–	(Moldova) SS11/Real Succes
Valeria Rusu	1	0	201?	(Moldova) Anenii Noi
Alina Şaitan	1	0	201?	(Moldova) Anenii Noi
Anastasia Sivolobova	5	0	201?–	(Portugal) A-dos-Francos
Anastasia Slonova	11	3	200?–200?	Retired
Maria Spînu	9	0	200?–201?	Unknown

== See also ==
- Moldova women's national football team
