= 2017–18 Moldovan Women's Cup =

Tournament details
- Country: Moldova
- Teams: 9

Final positions
- Champions: Agarista-ȘS Anenii Noi
- Runners-up: Noroc Nimoreni

Tournament statistics
- Matches played: 13
- Goals scored: 64 (4.92 per match)

The 2017–18 Moldovan Women's Cup (Romanian: Cupa Moldovei la fotbal feminin) was the 21st season of the Moldovan annual football tournament. The competition started on 4 October 2017 and concluded with the final at the Zimbru Stadium on 3 June 2018. A total of nine teams had their entries to the tournament.

== Preliminary round ==
4 October 2017	Agarista-ȘS Anenii Noi	12–0	ȘS Ciobruciu	Anenii Noi
16:00 EEST				Stadium: Stadionul Sport

== Quarter-finals ==
=== First legs ===
1 November 2017	Belceanka Bălți	0–1	Noroc Nimoreni	Bălți
14:00 EEST				Stadium: Școlii Sportive

1 November 2017	Maksimum Cahul	3–5	Alga Tiraspol	Cahul
14:00 EEST				Stadium: Raional Atlant

1 November 2017	ȘS 11-Real Succes	1–4	Agarista-ȘS Anenii Noi	Chișinău
14:00 EEST				Stadium: Real Succes

14 November 2017	LTPS-2 Chișinău	0–3	Narta-ȘS Drăsliceni	Ratuș
14:00 EEST				Stadium: Stadionul Sătesc

=== Second legs ===
15 November 2017	Noroc Nimoreni	2–1	Belceanka Bălți	Nimoreni
13:00 EEST				Stadium: Stadionul Sătesc

15 November 2017	Alga Tiraspol	10–0	Maksimum Cahul	Tiraspol
14:00 EEST				Stadium: Municipal ȘS4

15 November 2017	Agarista-ȘS Anenii Noi	9–0	ȘS 11-Real Succes	Anenii Noi
14:00 EEST				Stadium: Stadionul Sport

26 November 2017	Narta-ȘS Drăsliceni	1–2	LTPS-2 Chișinău	Ratuș
14:00 EEST				Stadium: Stadionul Sătesc

== Semi-finals ==
=== First legs ===
18 April 2018	Narta-ȘS Drăsliceni	1–0	Noroc Nimoreni	Nimoreni
16:30 EEST				Stadium: Stadionul Sătesc

18 April 2018	Agarista-ȘS Anenii Noi	2–1	Alga Tiraspol	Anenii Noi
16:00 EEST				Stadium: Stadionul Sport

=== Second legs ===
9 May 2018	Noroc Nimoreni	2–0	Narta-ȘS Drăsliceni	Nimoreni
16:00 EEST				Stadium: Stadionul Sătesc

9 May 2018	Alga Tiraspol	0–4	Agarista-ȘS Anenii Noi	Tiraspol
16:00 EEST				Stadium: Municipal ȘS4

== Final ==
The final was played on 3 June 2018 at the Zimbru Stadium in Chișinău.

3 June 2018
19:00 EEST

Agarista-ȘS Anenii Noi	2–1	Noroc Nimoreni
Caraman 12'; Gherghelijiu 78'	Report	Mardari 90+1' (pen.)

Zimbru Stadium, Chișinău
Attendance: 650
Referee: Igor Boșca
