= 2013–14 Moldovan Women's Cup =

Cupa Moldovei la Femei

Tournament details
- Country: Moldova
- Teams: 5

The 2013–14 Moldovan Women's Cup is the 8th edition of the Moldovan annual football tournament. The competition began on 3 October 2013 with the First Preliminary Round and will end with the final held in May 2014.

== Preliminary round ==
Matches took place on 3 October and 10 November 2013.

3 October 2013

FC Narta ŞS Drăsliceni	2–1	LTPS nr.2-Academia Nimoreni

10 November 2013

LTPS nr.2-Academia Nimoreni	0–3	FC Narta ŞS Drăsliceni

Narta win 5–1 on aggregate.

== Semi-finals ==
Played on 4 and 17 May 2014.

17 April 2014

Goliador Chişinău	2–1	FC Narta ŞS Drăsliceni

4 May 2014

FC Narta ŞS Drăsliceni	1–0	Goliador Chişinău

Narta advance 2–2 on aggregate by away goals rule.

17 April 2014

Noroc Nimoreni	1–1	PGU ȘS4-FC Alga Tiraspol

4 May 2014

PGU ȘS4-FC Alga Tiraspol	1–2	Noroc Nimoreni

Noroc advance 3–2 on aggregate.

== Final's ==
Played on 31 May 2014.

30 May 2014

FC Narta ŞS Drăsliceni	1-2	Noroc Nimoreni
