= 2026–27 Moldovan Women's Cup =

Tournament details
- Country: Moldova
- Teams: 5

Tournament statistics
- Matches played: 8
- Goals scored: 51 (6.38 per match)

The 2026–27 Moldovan Women's Cup (Romanian: Cupa Moldovei la fotbal feminin) is the 30th season of the Moldovan annual football tournament. The competition started on 2 September 2026 and will end in May 2027. A total of five teams had their entries to the tournament.

== Preliminary round ==
| Pos | Team | Pld | W | D | L | GF | GA | GD | Pts | Qualification | ZIM | AGA | REA | ISK | DAC |
|---|---|---|---|---|---|---|---|---|---|---|---|---|---|---|---|
| 1 | Zimbru Chișinău | 4 | 4 | 0 | 0 | 34 | 2 | +32 | 12 | Semi-finals | | | 6–1 | 11–0 | |
| 2 | Agarista Anenii Noi | 3 | 2 | 0 | 1 | 9 | 4 | +5 | 6 | Semi-finals | 0–4 | | | | 4–0 |
| 3 | Real Succes-Sireți | 3 | 1 | 0 | 2 | 4 | 12 | −8 | 3 | Semi-finals | | 0–5 | | 3–1 | |
| 4 | Iskra Rîbnița | 3 | 1 | 0 | 2 | 3 | 14 | −11 | 3 | Semi-finals | 16 Dec | 18 Nov | | | 2–0 |
| 5 | Dacia Buiucani | 3 | 0 | 0 | 3 | 1 | 19 | −18 | 0 | | 1–13 | 16 Dec | 18 Nov | | |

Updated to match(es) played on 28 October 2026. Source: fmf
Rules for classification: 1) Points; 2) Head-to-head points; 3) Head-to-head goal difference; 4) Head-to-head away goals scored; 5) Head-to-head goals scored; 6) Matches won; 7) Goal difference; 8) Goals scored; 9) Least red cards; 10) Least yellow cards; 11) Drawing of lots
