= 2024–25 Moldovan Women Top League =

Liga Națională
- Season: 2024–25
- Champions: Agarista Anenii Noi
- Champions League: Agarista Anenii Noi

The 2024–25 Moldovan Women Top League was the 25th season of the highest women's football league in Moldova. The competition started on 15 September 2024 and ended on 8 June 2025.

== Teams ==
Location of teams in 2024–25 Liga Națională

Club	Location
Agarista	Anenii Noi
Atletico	Bălți
Nistru	Cioburciu
Real Succes Pudra	Chișinău

== Format ==
Clubs will play each other eight times for a total of 24 matches per team.

== League table ==
Pos	Team	Pld	W	D	L	GF	GA	GD	Pts	Qualification
1	Agarista Anenii Noi (C)	24	21	2	1	122	13	+109	65	Qualification to Champions League first round
2	Nistru Cioburciu	24	14	5	5	52	19	+33	47	
3	Real Succes Pudra	24	6	2	16	24	90	−66	20	
4	Atletico Bălți	24	2	1	21	14	90	−76	7	withdrew (Note: Atletico Bălți completed the season but withdrew from the league prior to the start of the next season.)

Source: FMF, Soccerway
Rules for classification: 1) Points; 2) Play-off (only if deciding champion when two teams tied); 3) Head-to-head points; 4) Head-to-head goal difference; 5) Head-to-head away goals scored; 6) Head-to-head goals scored; 7) Matches won; 8) Goal difference; 9) Goals scored; 10) Least red cards; 11) Least yellow cards; 12) Drawing of lots
(C) Champions

=== Results ===
Matches 1−24
Home \ Away	AGA	ATL	NIS	REA	AGA	ATL	NIS	REA	AGA	ATL	NIS	REA	AGA	ATL	NIS	REA
Agarista Anenii Noi	—	7–1	0–0	11–0	—	10–1	3–0	9–1	—	8–0	1–1	6–1	—	10–0	2–0	10–0
Atletico Bălți	1–2	—	0–2	0–2	0–2	—	1–1	1–2	0–4	—	1–3	0–1	0–5	—	1–2	1–3
Nistru Cioburciu	2–1	2–0	—	4–0	0–2	2–0	—	2–0	0–1	2–0	—	0–0	1–2	14–0	—	4–0
Real Succes Pudra	1–10	1–4	0–1	—	2–7	0–1	2–2	—	1–4	1–0	1–3	—	0–5	4–1	1–4	—

Source: FMF (in Romanian)
Legend: Blue = home team win; Yellow = draw; Red = away team win.
