= Alexandra Bocancea =

Moldovan footballer (born 1989)

Personal information
- Date of birth: 22 October 1989 (age 37)
- Place of birth: Tiraspol, Soviet Union (now Moldova)
- Positions: Forward; midfielder

Senior career*
Years	Team	Apps	(Gls)
- Roma Calfa
- Goliador / ŞS11
- PGU ȘS4-FC Alga Tiraspol

International career^{‡}
2015	Moldova	3	(0)
- * Club domestic league appearances and goals ‡ National team caps and goals as of 1 December 2015

Alexandra Bocancea (born 22 October 1989) is a Moldovan footballer who plays as a forward and a midfielder. She has played officially for the senior Moldova women's national team.

== International career ==
Bocancea capped for Moldova at senior level during the UEFA Women's Euro 2017 qualifying preliminary round, in a 3–0 win against Luxembourg on 9 April 2015, and during the UEFA Women's Euro 2017 qualifying Group 4, in a 1–3 home loss to Poland on 27 November 2015.

== See also ==
- List of Moldova women's international footballers
