= 2022 Malta International Women's Football Tournament =

27th edition of the Algarve Cup

Tournament details
- Host country: Malta
- Dates: 16–22 February
- Teams: 3 (from 2 confederations)

Final positions
- Champions: Morocco (1st title)
- Runners-up: Malta
- Third place: Moldova

Tournament statistics
- Matches played: 3
- Goals scored: 9 (3 per match)
- Top scorer(s): nine players (1 goal)

The 2022 Malta International Women's Football Tournament was the second edition of the Malta International Tournament, an invitational women's football tournament held annually in Malta. It took place from 16 to 22 February 2022.

== Teams ==
Three teams were participating.

Team	FIFA Rankings (December 2021)
Morocco	78
Malta	95
Moldova	100

== Standings ==
Pos	Team	Pld	W	D	L	GF	GA	GD	Pts
1st place, gold medalist(s)	Morocco	2	2	0	0	5	0	+5	6
2nd place, silver medalist(s)	Malta (H)	2	1	0	1	3	2	+1	3
3rd place, bronze medalist(s)	Moldova	2	0	0	2	1	7	−6	0

Rules for classification: 1) Points; 2) Goal difference; 3) Goals scored; 4) Head-to-head points; 5) Head-to-head goal difference.
(H) Hosts

== Results ==
All times are local (UTC+1)

16 February 2022
16:00

Malta	3–1	Moldova
Zammit 32'; Flask 46'; Bugeja 82'	Report	Mardari 44'

Hibernians Stadium, Paola
Referee: Olivia Tschon (Austria)

19 February 2022
16:00

Malta	0–1	Morocco
	Report	Mssoudy 28'

Hibernians Stadium, Paola
Referee: Maria Ennsgraber (Austria)

22 February 2022
16:00

Morocco	4–0	Moldova
Saoud 5'; Ayane 34'; Redouani 37'; Chebbak 52' (pen.)	Report

Hibernians Stadium, Paola
Referee: Martina Molinaro (Italy)

== Goalscorers ==
There were 9 goals scored in 3 matches, for an average of 3 goals per match.

1 goal

- (Malta) Haley Bugeja
- (Malta) Jenna Flask
- (Malta) Charlene Zammit
- (Moldova) Daniela Mardari
- (Morocco) Rosella Ayane
- (Morocco) Ghizlane Chebbak
- (Morocco) Sanaâ Mssoudy
- (Morocco) Zineb Redouani
- (Morocco) Imane Saoud
