= Iulia Petelca =

Moldovan footballer

Personal information
- Date of birth: 1 April 1999 (age 27)
- Position: Defender

International career^{‡}
| Years | Team | Apps | (Gls) |
- Moldova
- ‡ National team caps and goals as of 23:49, 31 August 2019 (UTC)

Iulia Petelca (born 1 April 1999) is a Moldovan footballer who plays as a defender and has appeared for the Moldova women's national team.

== Career ==
Petelca has been capped for the Moldova national team, appearing for the team during the UEFA Women's Euro 2021 qualifying cycle.

== See also ==
- List of Moldova women's international footballers
