= Loghin =

Loghin is a Romanian surname. Notable people with the surname include:

- Diana Loghin (born 1997), Moldovan footballer
- Irina Loghin (born 1939), Romanian singer and politician
- Mihaela Loghin (born 1952), Romanian shot putter
