= Cojuhari =

Cojuhari is a surname. Notable people with the surname include:

- Veronica Cojuhari, Moldovan footballer
- Olesea Cojuhari, Moldovan sprinter
