= Moldovan Women's Cup =

Cupa Moldovei la fotbal feminin
- Founded: 1997
- Region: Moldova
- Teams: 5 (2023–24)
- Current champions: Zimbru Chișinău (1 title)
- Most championships: Agarista-ȘS Anenii Noi (6 titles)
- Website: Official site (in Romanian)
- 2026–27

The Moldovan Women's Cup is the annual cup competition of women's football teams in Moldova. It was first contested in 1997.

== List of finals ==
The list of finals:

Season	Champion	Result	Runner-up
1996–97	Codru Chişinău	2–0	Făclia Anenii Noi
1997–98	Făclia Anenii Noi	1–1 (5–4 pen.)	Constructorul Chișinău
1998–99	Constructorul Chișinău	6–1	Făclia Anenii Noi
1999–2000	Tiras Tiraspol	2–0	Făclia Anenii Noi
2000–01	Codru Anenii Noi	5–0	Făclia Chișinău
2001–02	Codru Anenii Noi	5–0	Gloria Chișinău
2003–04	Codru Anenii Noi	5–0	Green Team Chișinău
2004–05	Codru Anenii Noi	3–0	Narta Chișinău
2005–06	Narta Chișinău	3–0	Moldova Mândreşti
2006–07	Narta Chișinău	3–0	Moldova Mândreşti
2007–08	Narta Chișinău	3–0	Roma Puhăceni
2008–09	Narta Chișinău	1–0	Roma Puhăceni
2009–10	PGU ȘS4-FC Alga Tiraspol	1–1 (6–5 pen.)	Roma Puhăceni
2010–11	Goliador Chişinău	1–0 a.e.t.	UTM Chişinău
2011–12	Noroc	10–1	ŞS Bălţi
2012–13	PGU ȘS4-FC Alga Tiraspol	1–1 (4–3 pen.)	Goliador Chişinău
2013–14	Noroc Nimoreni	2–1	Narta Chișinău
2014–15	PGU ȘS4-FC Alga Tiraspol	1–1 (4–2 pen.)	Noroc Nimoreni
2015–16	Noroc Nimoreni	2–0	PGU ȘS4-FC Alga Tiraspol
2016–17	ȘS 11-Real Succes	3–1	Belceanka Bălți
2017–18	Agarista-ȘS Anenii Noi	2–1	Noroc Nimoreni
2018–19	Agarista-ȘS Anenii Noi	3–1	Noroc Nimoreni
2019–20	Agarista-ȘS Anenii Noi	2–1	ȘS Ciobruciu-GTC
2020–21	FC Narta ŞS Drăsliceni	2–1	FC Maksimum Cahul
2021–22	Agarista Anenii Noi	3-0	Noroc Nimoreni
2022–23	Agarista Anenii Noi	4-0	Noroc Nimoreni
2023–24	Agarista Anenii Noi	5-0	Real Succes Pudra
2024–25	Agarista Anenii Noi	1-0	Nistru Cioburciu
2025–26	Zimbru Chișinău	2-0	Agarista Anenii Noi

== Performance by club ==
Club	Winners	Winning Years
Agarista-ȘS Anenii Noi	7	2017–18, 2018–19, 2019–20, 2021–22, 2022–23, 2023–24, 2024–25
FC Narta ŞS Drăsliceni	5	2005–06, 2006–07, 2007–08, 2008–09, 2020–21
Codru Anenii Noi	4	2000–01, 2001–02, 2003–04, 2004–05
PGU ŞS4-FC Alga Tiraspol	3	2009–10, 2012–13, 2014–15
Noroc Nimoreni	3	2011–12, 2013–14, 2015–16
Codru Chişinău	1	1996–97
Făclia Anenii Noi	1	1997–98
Constructorul Chișinău	1	1998–99
Tiras Tiraspol	1	1999–2000
Goliador Chişinău	1	2010–11
ȘS 11-Real Succes	1	2016–17
Zimbru Chișinău	1	2025–26

== Top Goalscoarers ==
Season	Name	Club
2022–23	Anisia Său (6 goals)	FC Noroc Nimoreni
2023–24	Ludmila Caraman and Arina Șeicaș (7 goals)	Agarista-ȘS Anenii Noi and Real Succes Pudra
2024–25	Polina Mazur (9 goals)	Agarista-ȘS Anenii Noi
2025–26	Corina Vasilache (18 goals)	Agarista-ȘS Anenii Noi
