= 2015–16 Moldovan Women's Cup =

Cupa Moldovei la Femei

Tournament details
- Country: Moldova
- Teams: 8

The 2015–16 Moldovan Women's Cup is the 18th edition of the Moldovan annual football tournament. The competition began on 14 October 2015 with the preliminary round and will end with the final held in May 2016.

== Quarterfinals ==
Matches took place on 14 October and 4 November 2015.

14 October 2015

Real Succes-ȘS 11	0-3	CS Noroc Nimoreni

4 November 2015

CS Noroc Nimoreni	3-0	Real Succes-ȘS 11

14 October 2015

FC Narta ȘS Drăsliceni	0-12	ARF Criuleni

4 November 2015

ARF Criuleni	7-1	FC Narta ȘS Drăsliceni

14 October 2015

LTPS nr.2-Academia Nimoreni	0-1	ȘS Bălți

4 November 2015

ȘS Bălți	1-1	LTPS nr.2-Academia Nimoreni

14 October 2015

PGU ŞS4-FC Alga Tiraspol	14-0	FC Maximum Cahul

4 November 2015

FC Maximum Cahul	0-7	PGU ŞS4-FC Alga Tiraspol

== Semifinals ==
6 April 2016

CS Noroc Nimoreni	1-0	ARF Criuleni

20 April 2016

ARF Criuleni	2-3	CS Noroc Nimoreni

6 April 2016

ȘS Bălți	1-4	PGU ŞS4-FC Alga Tiraspol

20 April 2016

PGU ŞS4-FC Alga Tiraspol	4-0	ȘS Bălți

== FINAL ==
29 May 2016

PGU ŞS4-FC Alga Tiraspol	0-2	CS Noroc Nimoreni
