= Valeria Rusu =

Moldovan footballer

Personal information
- Date of birth: 31 December 1997 (age 28)
- Position: Defender

Senior career*
Years	Team	Apps	(Gls)
2015-2019	CS Noroc		
2019-	Anenii Noi		

International career^{‡}
2012–2013	Moldova U17	6	(0)
2014–2015	Moldova U19	6	(0)
2015	Moldova	1	(0)
- * Club domestic league appearances and goals ‡ National team caps and goals as of 20 September 2016

Valeria Rusu (born 31 December 1997) is a Moldovan footballer who plays as a defender for the Moldova women's national team.

== See also ==
- List of Moldova women's international footballers
