= Imane Saoud =

Moroccan footballer (born 2002)

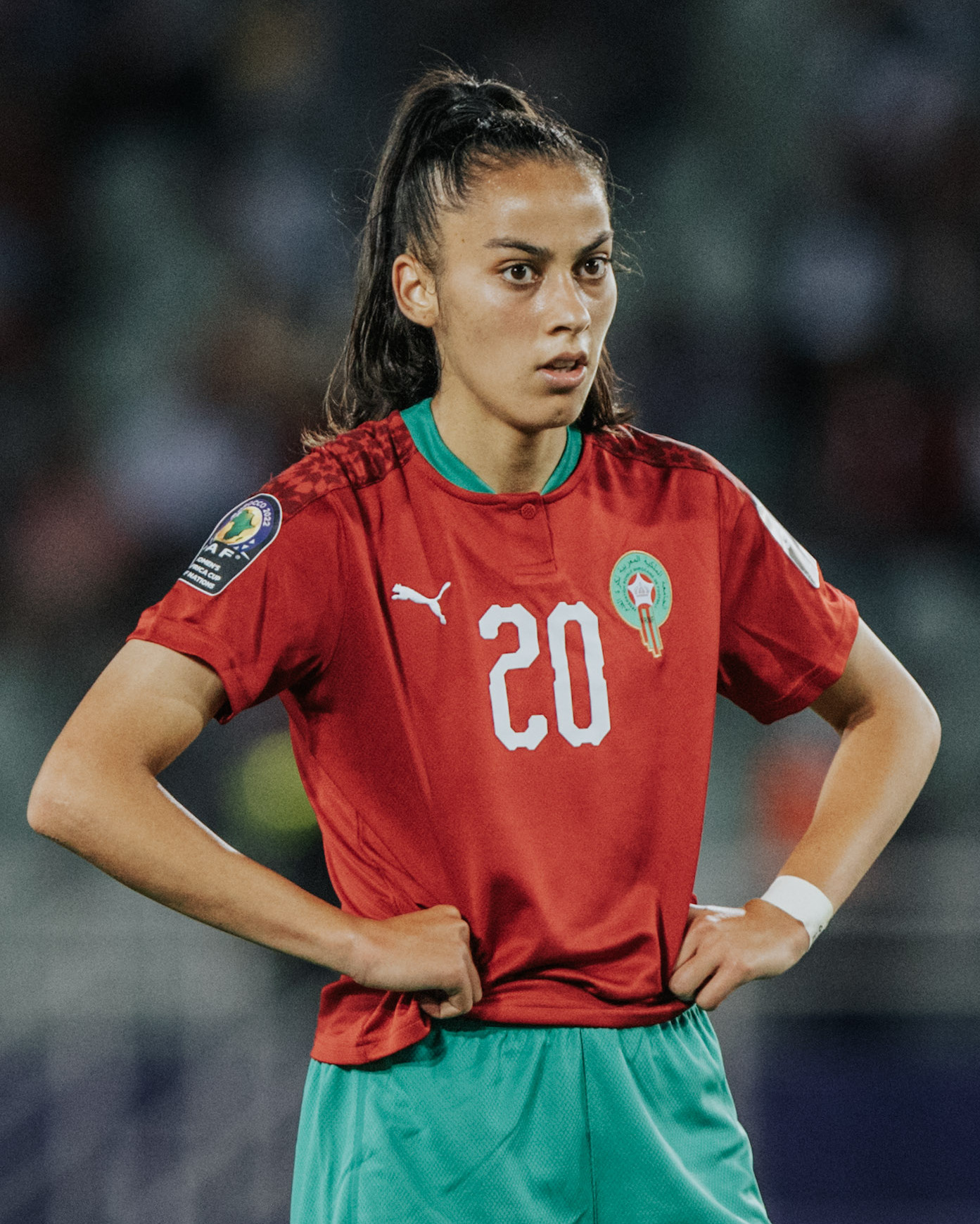
- Saoud representing Morocco in 2022

Personal information
- Date of birth: 6 June 2002 (age 24)
- Place of birth: Casablanca, Morocco
- Height: 1.70 m (5 ft 7 in)
- Position: Midfielder

Team information
- Current team: Nantes

Senior career*
Years	Team	Apps	(Gls)
2018–2020	Vendenheim	35	(3)
2020–2022	Basel	43	(9)
2022–2025	Servette	48	(16)
2025–	Nantes	16	(2)

International career^{‡}
2018	France U16	5	(0)
2018	France U17	3	(0)
2019	France U20	2	(0)
2021–	Morocco		
Medal record
Representing Morocco
Women's Africa Cup of Nations
Second place	2022 Morocco
- * Club domestic league appearances and goals as of 6 March 2026 ‡ National team caps and goals as of 28 October 2025

Imane Saoud (Arabic: إيمان سعود, born 6 June 2002) is a Moroccan professional footballer who plays as a midfielder for Première Ligue club Nantes.

== Club career ==
Saoud has played for FC Vendenheim in France and for Basel in Switzerland. She later played for Servette.

Saoud played for Basel during the 2020–21 and 2021–22 seasons. She played 43 games and scored 9 goals. She moved to Servette on a three-year contract in August 2022 where she plays with her Morocco teammate Élodie Nakkach.

She recorded her first goal in her first match with Servette, a friendly on 3 August 2022 against Olympique Lyonnais. She played her first official match of the season in the preliminary round of the Champions League where she came in as a substitute in the 56th minute against Paris. She played her first league match of the season on 27 August 2022 where she provided two assists against Young Boys. She recorded her first goal of the season on 5 November 2022 when she opened the scoring against Young Boys. She scored 5 goals during the 2022/23 season.

== International career ==
Saoud began her international career with the French youth team. She participated in qualifiers for the U-17 European Championship.

In February 2021, she received her first call-up to the Morocco national team for training. Saoud made her senior debut for Morocco on 10 June 2021 in a 3–0 friendly home win over Mali. During this game, she scored her first international goal.

Saoud was part of the 26-woman squad chosen by Reynald Pedros to compete at the 2022 Women's Africa Cup of Nations, where Morocco finished second and qualified for the World Cup.

In preparation for the 2023 Women's World Cup, Saoud was selected to attend an October 2022 training camp in Spain where Morocco faced Poland and Canada. She featured in Morocco's 0–4 loss to Canada. She was not chosen as part of Morocco's World Cup squad.

== Career statistics ==
No.	Date	Venue	Opponent	Score	Result	Competition
1.	11 June 2021	Moulay Hassan Stadium, Rabat, Morocco	Mali	2–0	3–0	Friendly
2.	22 February 2022	Tony Bezzina Stadium, Paola, Malta	Moldova	1–0	4–0	2022 Malta International Women's Football Tournament
3.	7 April 2022	Prince Moulay Abdellah Stadium, Rabat, Morocco	Gambia	2–0	6–1	Friendly
4.	31 October 2023	Moulay Hassan Stadium, Rabat, Morocco	Namibia	1–0	2–0	2024 CAF Women's Olympic Qualifying Tournament
5.	5 December 2023	Moulay Hassan Stadium, Rabat, Morocco	Uganda	2–0	3–0	Friendly
6.	28 October 2025	Père Jégo Stadium, Casablanca, Morocco	Haiti	1–0	3–0	Friendly

== See also ==
- List of Morocco women's international footballers
