= WFC Zimbru Chișinău =

Zimbru
- Full name: WFC Zimbru
- Founded: 2025
- Ground: Zimbru-2, Chișinău
- Capacity: 2,000
- Coach: Valentin Munteanu
- League: Women's League
Home colours	Away colours

WFC Zimbru is a Moldovan women's football team based in Chișinău, that competes in the Moldovan Women's League and the Moldovan Women's Cup.

== History ==
The team was founded in 2025 as the women's football section of Zimbru Chișinău.

== Squad ==
As of 9 September 2026

Note: Flags indicate national team as defined under FIFA eligibility rules; some limited exceptions apply. Players may hold more than one non-FIFA nationality.

No.	Pos.	Nation	Player
1	GK	BLR	Kamilla Butkevich
2	GK	MDA	Alexandra Moloșnic
3	MF	MDA	Elisaveta Belcencova
4	DF	MDA	Valeria Vîrlan
6	MF	MDA	Adelina Șalaru
7	MF	MDA	Corina Gorcea
8	FW	MDA	Alexandra Drumea
10	MF	KAZ	Kamila Sovet
11	MF	MDA	Sofiia Dobrovolska
13	FW	MDA	Polina Mazur
14	MF	MDA	Elina Coceanovschi

No.	Pos.	Nation	Player
17	MF	MDA	Mihaela Gamarț
19	MF	MDA	Olesea Titcu
21	DF	MDA	Alexandra Cucer
22	MF	MDA	Tatiana Balaban
33	MF	MDA	Adela Borșci
57	MF	MDA	Veronica Cojuhari
73	DF	MDA	Anastasia Bordeniuc (captain)
77	MF	MDA	Ludmila Caraman
95	MF	MDA	Ecaterina Cucer
99	FW	MDA	Iuliana Colnic

== Honours ==
- Moldovan Women's League
  - Winners: (1) 2025–26
- Moldovan Women's Cup
  - Winners: (1) 2025–26

== European record ==
Season	Competition	Round	Opponent	Home	Away	Agg.
2026–27	Women's Champions League	First qualifying round Semi-final	(Kosovo) Mitrovica	—N/a	0–10	4th
2026–27	Women's Champions League	First qualifying round Third-place	(Faroe Islands) KÍ Klaksvík	1–4		4th
