= Ghenadie =

Ghenadie is a Romanian-language given name that may refer to:

- Ghenadie Ciobanu (born 1957), Moldovan politician
- Ghenadie Lisoconi (born 1964), Moldovan sport shooter
- Ghenadie Moșneaga (born 1985), Moldovan footballer
- Ghenadie Ochincă (born 1984), Moldovan footballer
- Ghenadie Olexici (born 1978), Moldovan footballer
- Ghenadie Orbu (born 1982), Moldovan footballer
- Ghenadie Petrescu (1836–1918), Romanian Orthodox bishop
- Ghenadie Pușcă (born 1975), Moldovan footballer
- Ghenadie Tulbea (born 1979), Moldovan and Monegasque wrestler
