= Alina Șaitan =

Moldovan footballer

Personal information
- Birth name: Alina Bîrca
- Date of birth: 1 May 1991 (age 35)
- Position: Goalkeeper

Team information
- Current team: Anenii Noi
- Number: 1

Senior career*
Years	Team	Apps	(Gls)
2010-2011	Roma Calfa		
2012-2018	CS Noroc		
2018-	Anenii Noi		

International career^{‡}
2006	Moldova U19	1	(0)
2016	Moldova	1	(0)
- * Club domestic league appearances and goals ‡ National team caps and goals as of 20 September 2016

Alina Șaitan (née Bîrca, born 1 May 1991) is a Moldovan footballer who plays as a goalkeeper for Women's Championship club Anenii Noi and the Moldova women's national team.

== See also ==
- List of Moldova women's international footballers
