= Daniela Mardari =

Moldovan footballer (born 2001)

Personal information
- Date of birth: 2 June 2001 (age 25)
- Place of birth: Moldova
- Height: 1.72 m (5 ft 8 in)
- Positions: Midfielder; defender

Team information
- Current team: Rayo Vallecano
- Number: 6

Senior career*
Years	Team	Apps	(Gls)
2017–2019	Heniu	37	(2)
2019–2021	Vasas	22	(1)
2021–2022	U Galați	5	(2)
2022	Apulia Trani	13	(0)
2022	Crotone	19	(4)
2022–2023	La Solana	21	(0)
2023–	Rayo Vallecano		

International career^{‡}
2016	Moldova U-15	2	(0)
2016–2017	Moldova U-17		
2017–2019	Moldova U-19		
2018–	Moldova	34	(1)
- * Club domestic league appearances and goals as of 12 February 2021 ‡ National team caps and goals as of 31 July 2025

Daniela Mardari (born 2 June 2001) is a Moldovan footballer who plays as a defender and midfielder for Spanish Segunda Federación club Rayo Vallecano and the Moldova women's national team.

== Career ==
Mardari has been capped for the Moldova national team, appearing for the team during the UEFA Women's Euro 2021 qualifying cycle.

== International goals ==
No.	Date	Venue	Opponent	Score	Result	Competition
1.	16 February 2022	Hibernians Stadium, Paola, Malta	Malta	1–1	1–3	2022 Malta International Women's Football Tournament

== See also ==
- List of Moldova women's international footballers
