= Tatiana Frunză =

Moldovan footballer

Personal information
- Birth name: Tatiana Corman
- Date of birth: 25 April 1987 (age 39)
- Place of birth: Telenești, Soviet Union (now Moldova)
- Position: Defender

Senior career*
Years	Team	Apps	(Gls)
- Roma Calfa
- CS Noroc

International career
2004	Moldova U19	1	(?)
2006	Moldova	1	(0)
- * Club domestic league appearances and goals

Tatiana Frunză (née Corman; born 25 April 1987) is a Moldovan former footballer who played as a defender. She has officially played for the senior Moldova women's national team.

== International career ==
Frunză capped for Moldova at senior level during the 2007 FIFA Women's World Cup qualification (UEFA second category), as a second half substitution in a 0–3 home loss to Wales on 7 May 2006.
