= Anastasia Toma =

Moldovan footballer

Personal information
- Date of birth: 11 February 1996 (age 30)
- Position: Forward

Senior career*
Years	Team	Apps	(Gls)
2013-2015	CS Galiador		
2016-2017	Heniu Prundu Bargaului		
2017	ENP		
2017-2018	Nea Salamis		
2018	FC Noroc		
2018	Smedjebackens FK		
2018-2020	FC Noroc		
2020-2021	Omonia		
2021-2022	Heniu Prundu Bargaului		
2022-2023	FC Carmen București		
2023-	Anenii Noi		

International career^{‡}
	Moldova	17	(2)
- * Club domestic league appearances and goals ‡ National team caps and goals as of 31 July 2025

Anastasia Toma (born 11 February 1996) is a Moldovan footballer who plays as a forward and has appeared for the Moldova women's national team.

== Career ==
Toma has been capped for the Moldova national team, appearing for the team during the 2019 FIFA Women's World Cup qualifying cycle.

== International goals ==
No.	Date	Venue	Opponent	Score	Result	Competition
1.	6 April 2018	Stadionul CPSM, Vadul lui Vodă, Moldova	Italy	1–2	1–3	2019 FIFA Women's World Cup qualification
2.	14 July 2023	Stadionul CPSM, Vadul lui Vodă, Moldova	Montenegro	2–1	2–1	Friendly
