= Margarita Panova =

Moldovan footballer

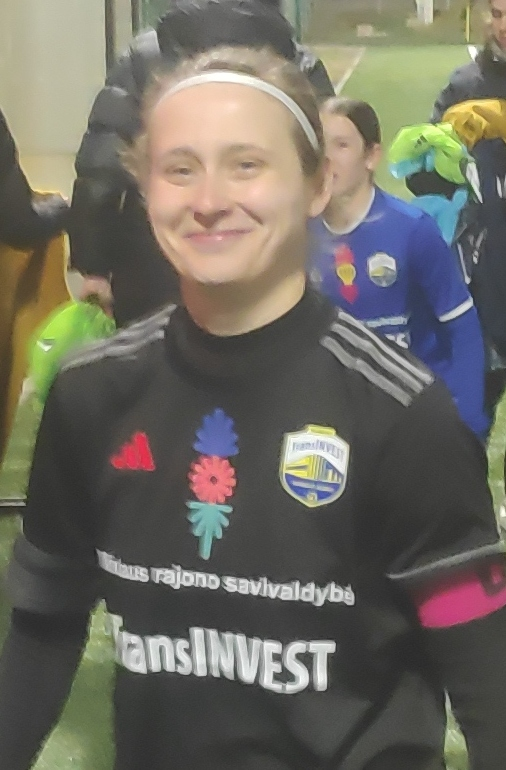

Personal information
- Date of birth: 31 January 1998 (age 28)
- Position: Goalkeeper

Team information
- Current team: FK Transinvest
- Number: 31

Senior career*
Years	Team	Apps	(Gls)
- Einherji

International career^{‡}
	Moldova	21	(0)
- * Club domestic league appearances and goals as of 19:45, 30 August 2019 (UTC) ‡ National team caps and goals as of 30 July 2025

Margarita Panova (born 31 January 1998) is a Moldovan footballer who plays as a goalkeeper and has appeared for the Moldova women's national team.

== Career ==
Panova has been capped for the Moldova national team, appearing for the team during the 2019 FIFA Women's World Cup qualifying cycle.

== See also ==
- List of Moldova women's international footballers
