= Eugenia Miron =

Moldovan footballer

Personal information
- Date of birth: 25 November 1992 (age 33)
- Place of birth: Russia
- Position: Midfielder

International career^{‡}
Years	Team	Apps	(Gls)
- Moldova
- ‡ National team caps and goals as of 19:44, 30 August 2019 (UTC)

Eugenia Miron (born 25 November 1992) is a Russian-born Moldovan footballer who plays midfielder and has appeared for the Moldova women's national team.

== Career ==
Miron has been capped for the Moldova national team, appearing for the team during the 2019 FIFA Women's World Cup qualifying cycle.

== See also ==
- List of Moldova women's international footballers
