= Veronica Cojuhari =

Moldovan footballer

Personal information
- Date of birth: 3 October 1998 (age 28)
- Positions: Midfielder; forward

Team information
- Current team: Shakhtar Donetsk
- Number: 17

Senior career*
Years	Team	Apps	(Gls)
2020-2021	Voskhod		
2020-2021	Shaktar Donetsk		
2021-2022	Olimpia Cluj		
2022	Lakatamia		
2023	Anenii Noi		
2023	FK Zhytlobud		
2023-	Zhytlobud		

International career^{‡}
2014	Moldova U17	3	(0)
2019–	Moldova	5	(0)
- * Club domestic league appearances and goals ‡ National team caps and goals as of 7 March 2020

Veronica Cojuhari (born 3 October 1998) is a Moldovan footballer who plays as a midfielder and a forward for Women's Championship club Shakhtar Donetsk and the Moldova women's national team.

She played for Ukrainian club Voskhod Stara Mayachka (near Kherson) for the second half of 2020–21 season of Ukrainian top tier. At summer break she signed up with newly created women team of Shakhtar Donetsk that entered the second tier competitions.

== International goals ==
No.	Date	Venue	Opponent	Score	Result	Competition
1.	31 October 2023	Zimbru Stadium, Chișinău, Moldova	Latvia	3–1	3–3	2023–24 UEFA Women's Nations League
2.	28 November 2024	Stadionul CPSM, Vadul lui Vodă, Moldova	Armenia	1–1	1–1	Friendly
