= Violeta Mițul =

Moldovan footballer (1997–2023)

Personal information
- Date of birth: 3 April 1997
- Place of birth: Tiraspol, Moldova
- Date of death: 4 September 2023 (aged 26)
- Place of death: Vopnafjörður, Iceland
- Position: Left-back

Senior career*
Years	Team	Apps	(Gls)
2010–2016	FC Alga Tiraspol		
2016	ZHFK Astana		
2017–2018	ZHFK Okzhetpes		
2019	Vasas Femina FC		
2019–2020	SDUSHOR 8		
2020–2021	FC Banat Girls		
2021	WFC Voskhod		
2021–2022	Apulia Trani		
2022	FF La Solana		
2023	Einherji	18	(4)

International career^{‡}
2017–2023	Moldova	41	(0)
- * Club domestic league appearances and goals as of 6 September 2023 ‡ National team caps and goals as of 6 September 2023

Violeta Mițul (3 April 1997 – 4 September 2023) was a Moldovan footballer who played as a left-back. Mițul was capped for the Moldova national team, appearing for the team during the 2019 FIFA Women's World Cup qualifying cycle. Since early 2023 she played for the Icelandic football club Ungmennafélagið Einherji.

== Death ==
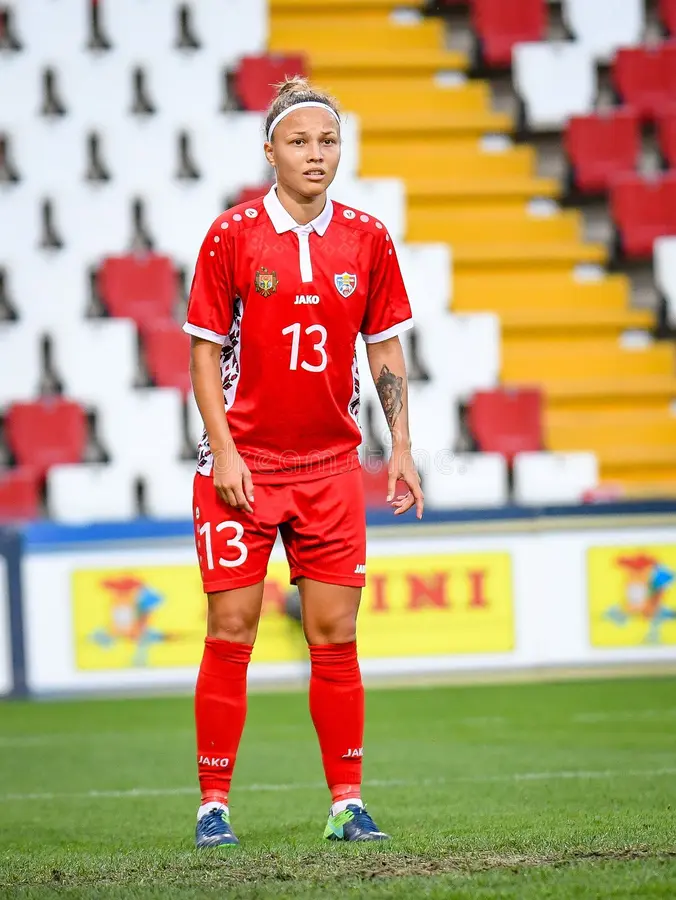
Violeta Mițul

On 4 September 2023, Mițul died from an accidental fall from a cliff in the harbour area in Vopnafjörður. She was 26.

== See also ==
- List of association football players who died during their careers
- List of Moldova women's international footballers
