= Ghenadie Pușca =

Moldovan footballer

Personal information
- Date of birth: 22 April 1975 (age 51)
- Place of birth: Chișinău, Moldavian SSR, Soviet Union
- Height: 1.85 m (6 ft 1 in)
- Position: Midfielder

Team information
- Current team: Moldova women (head coach)

Youth career
- 1994–1995: CSA Victoria Cahul

Senior career*
Years	Team	Apps	(Gls)
1995	CSA Victoria Cahul	20	(4)
1996	Constructorul Chişinău	19	(0)
1997	Spumante Cricova	2	(0)
1997	CSA Victoria Cahul	6	(0)
1997–2001	Constructorul Chişinău	71	(9)
2001	Zimbru Chișinău	18	(0)
2002	Zarafshon Navoi	25	(0)
2003–2004	Zimbru Chișinău	7	(0)
2004	Nistru Otaci	6	(1)
2005	Okzhetpes	26	(0)
2005–2008	Dacia Chișinău	57	(5)
2008	Savit Mogilev	13	(1)
2009	Dacia Chișinău	0	(0)
Total		270	(20)

International career^{‡}
1998–2003	Moldova	8	(0)

Managerial career
- 2013–2015: Moldova U19
- 2024–: Moldova women
- * Club domestic league appearances and goals as of 1 December 2009 ‡ National team caps and goals as of 1 December 2009

Ghenadie Pușca (born 22 April 1975) is a retired Moldovan footballer. He is the current head coach of the Moldova women's national team.

During 2013–2015 he was a head coach of Moldova national under-19 football team.
