= Cristina Cerescu =

Moldovan footballer (born 1995)

Personal information
- Full name: Cristina Cerescu
- Date of birth: 6 March 1995 (age 31)
- Place of birth: Moldova
- Height: 1.70 m (5 ft 7 in)
- Position: Centre-back

Team information
- Current team: CS Gloria 2018 Bistrița-Năsăud
- Number: 22

Senior career*
Years	Team	Apps	(Gls)
2018–2020	FC Universitatea Galați	58	(4)
2020–2021	U Olimpia Cluj	24	(3)
2021-2023	Pink Bari		
2023-	Gloria Bistrița		

International career^{‡}
2017–	Moldova	50	(1)
- * Club domestic league appearances and goals as of 30 August 2019 ‡ National team caps and goals as of 31 July 2025

Cristina Cerescu (born 6 March 1995) is a Moldovan footballer who plays as a centre-back and has appeared for the Moldova women's national team.

== Career ==
Cerescu has been capped for the Moldova national team, appearing for the team during the 2019 FIFA Women's World Cup qualifying cycle.

== See also ==
- List of Moldova women's international footballers
