= Diana Loghin =

Moldovan footballer (born 1997)

Personal information
- Date of birth: 23 April 1997 (age 29)
- Position: Defender

International career^{‡}
Years	Team	Apps	(Gls)
- Moldova
- ‡ National team caps and goals as of 19:44, 30 August 2019 (UTC)

Diana Loghin (born 23 April 1997) is a Moldovan footballer who plays as a defender and has appeared for the Moldova women's national team.

== Career ==
Loghin has been capped for the Moldova national team, appearing for the team during the 2019 FIFA Women's World Cup qualifying cycle.
