= Cristina Musteață =

Moldovan footballer (born 1985)

Personal information
- Birth name: Cristina Dolgovici
- Date of birth: 22 June 1985 (age 41)
- Position: Centre-back

Senior career*
Years	Team	Apps	(Gls)
2002–2016	Codru Chisinau		
2016–2017	Criuleni		
2017–	Anenii Noi		

International career^{‡}
	Moldova	17	(0)
- * Club domestic league appearances and goals as of 19:44, 30 August 2019 (UTC) ‡ National team caps and goals as of 7 March 2020

Cristina Musteață (née Dolgovici; born 22 June 1985) is a Moldovan footballer who plays as a centre-back and has appeared for the Moldova women's national team.

== Career ==
Musteață has been capped for the Moldova national team, appearing for the team during the 2019 FIFA Women's World Cup qualifying cycle.

== See also ==
- List of Moldova women's international footballers
