= Goliador Chișinău =

- Full name: CS Goliador-SS 11 Chișinău
- League: Top league
- 2013–14: 1st

Goliador Chișinău is a Moldovan women's football club, based in Chișinău.

The team plays in the country's top level league. The team has won the double in 2010–11 winning the championship and the Moldovan Women's Cup. It debuted in Europe in the 2011–12 UEFA Women's Champions League qualifying round. Goliador though lost all their matches without scoring a goal.

The team won their second championship title in 2012–13 overtaking FC Noroc on the last matchday. A third title was won in 2014.

== European matches ==
The team is still looking to score their first goal in three seasons.

Competition	Round	Country	Club	Result
2011–12 UEFA Women's Champions League	Qualifying round	(Greece)	PAOK	0–3
2011–12 UEFA Women's Champions League	Qualifying round	(Switzerland)	YB Frauen	0–7
2011–12 UEFA Women's Champions League	Qualifying round	(North Macedonia)	ZFK Naše Taksi	0–6
2013–14 UEFA Women's Champions League	Qualifying round	(Israel)	ASA Tel Aviv	0–6
2013–14 UEFA Women's Champions League	Qualifying round	(Cyprus)	Apollon Limassol	0–1
2013–14 UEFA Women's Champions League	Qualifying round	(Slovakia)	Nové Zámky	0–6
2014–15 UEFA Women's Champions League	Qualifying round	(Croatia)	Osijek	0–12
2014–15 UEFA Women's Champions League	Qualifying round	(Serbia)	Spartak Subotica	0–19
2014–15 UEFA Women's Champions League	Qualifying round	(Greece)	Amazones Dramas	0–11
