= Stadionul CPSM =

Coordinates: 47°04′53″N 29°06′30″E

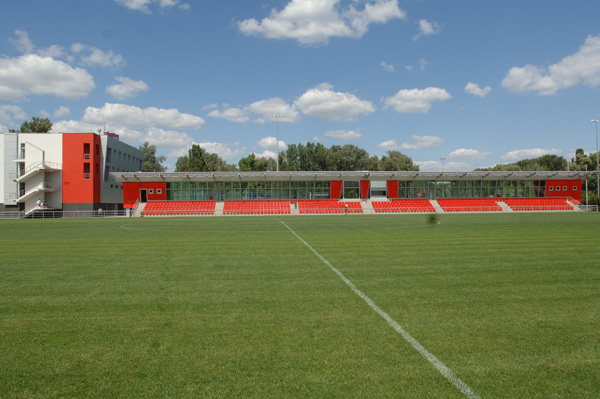
- The stadium in 2011; UEFA
- Interactive map of Stadionul CPSM
- Address: Parcul Nistrean Street; Vadul lui Vodă; Moldova
- Owner: FMF
- Capacity: 1,220
- Surface: Natural grass
- Field size: 105 x 68 m

Construction
- Opened: 2002
- Architects: Denis Nedeoglo (EOS-STUDIO, Moldova)
- Project managers: Denis Nedeoglo (EOS-STUDIO, Moldova)
- Structural engineer: Natalia Grișchina
- General contractors: Dialin-Exim, Moldova

Stadionul CPSM, officially Centrul de pregătire al selecționatelor Moldovei, since 2002, is the technical centre of the Moldovan Football Federation. It's located in Vadul lui Vodă, a town on the banks of the Dniester River, 25 kilometres away from the capital Chișinău. The technical centre was inaugurated on 21 August 2002. US$400,000 was invested in land base, a land of turf artificial construction designed specifically with other spectators, two natural land complex with a hotel, studio rooms and a medical centre.

== Utilization and Events ==
The facility serves as a multifunctional centre, including its use as a training hub for coaches spanning from those instructing youth teams to those coaching at the "Pro" level. It also serves as a venue for hosting seminars for referees, sports physicians, and football club administrators. Additionally, it plays a pivotal role in organizing events aimed at promoting football in Moldova.

The Center for Sports Medicine (CPSM) has played host to various football matches, encompassing competitions such as the FIFA Women's World Cup Preliminaries, the UEFA Regions' Cup, the UEFA European Championships for junior boys and girls (U-17 and U-19), the UEFA Development Tournament, Moldovan Liga matches, and finals of the National Cups for women's football, junior teams, veterans, and amateur teams. Moreover, it has been a chosen venue for several FIFA, UEFA, and Moldovan Football Federation seminars, as well as football festivals, and has been the site of numerous national and international tournaments.

== Renovation ==
In the summer of 2008, the Technical Center in Moldova was severely affected by flooding resulting from the overflow of the Dniester River. Promptly responding to the crisis, with the assistance of international football governing bodies, FIFA and UEFA, the Moldovan Football Federation efficiently carried out the necessary restoration work in record time.

The renovation efforts encompassed a comprehensive refurbishment of all hotel facilities, including redecoration, repainting, and furniture replacement. Additionally, modern amenities were introduced, such as a state-of-the-art medical office and a massage room. The fitness and recovery rooms were also revamped with cutting-edge equipment.

Over the ensuing years, driven by the support provided through the FIFA "Goal" program and the UEFA "HatTrick" program, the Center for Sports Medicine (CPSM) in Moldova underwent a significant modernization process to align with European standards. This transformation garnered recognition from prominent figures in European football, including former UEFA President Michel Platini, who visited the FMF Center and praised it as one of the finest facilities in Europe.

The positive evaluation of Moldova's facilities continued with the visit of the current UEFA President, Aleksander Čeferin, who inspected the center in September 2021 during Moldova's hosting of the ground-breaking UEFA Executive Committee meeting.
