= Vadul lui Vodă =

- Town
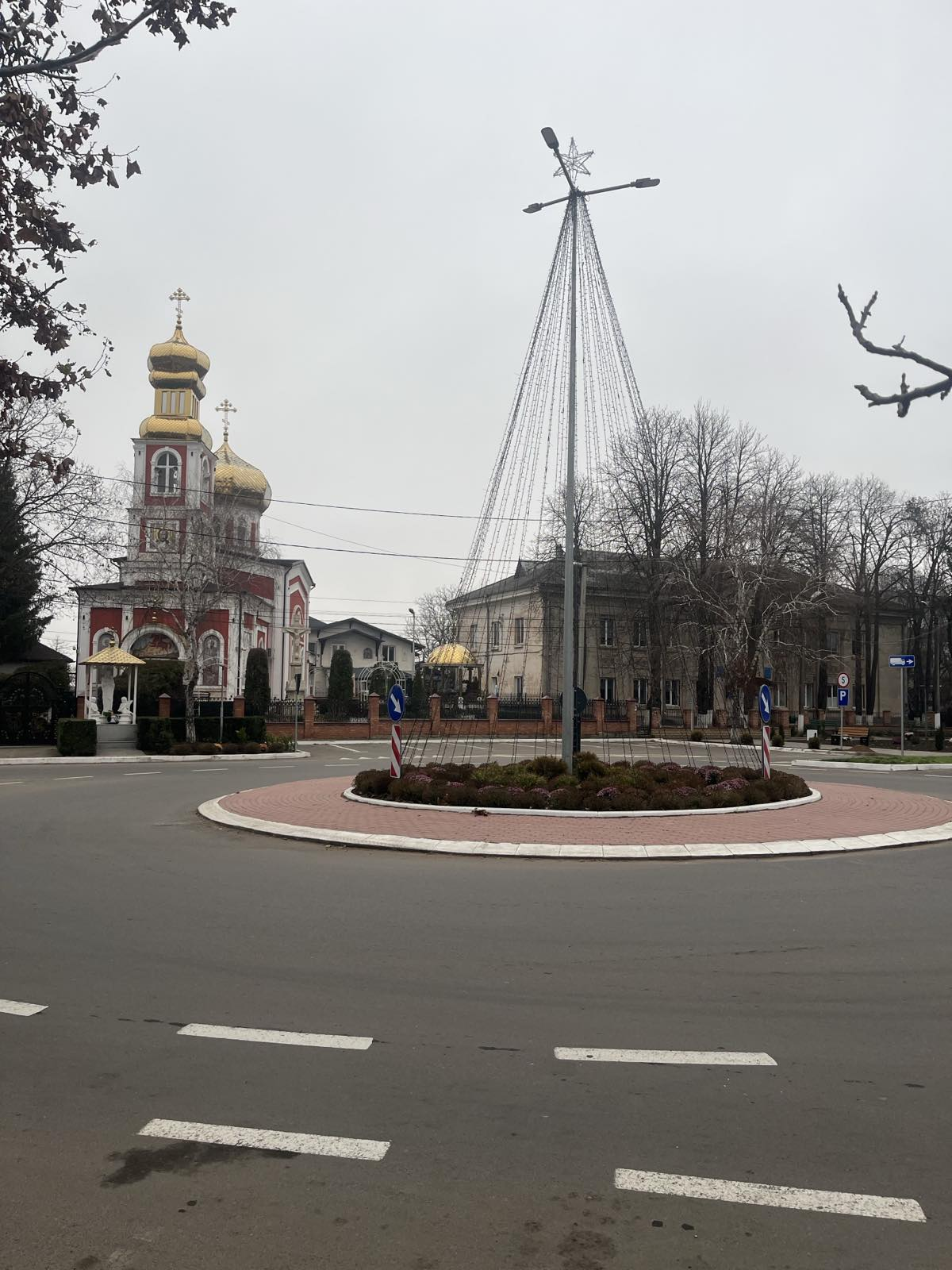

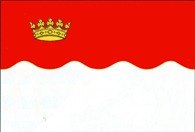
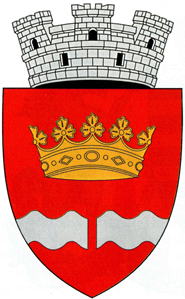
- Flag Coat of arms

- Location within Moldova
- Coordinates: 47°05′30″N 29°04′32″E
- Country: Moldova
- Municipality: Chișinău
- Founded: 1432

Government
  - Mayor: Iuri Onofriiciuc (PSRM)

Area
  - Total: 14.43 km^{2} (5.57 sq mi)
- Elevation: 33 m (108 ft)

Population (2024)
  - Total: 4,280
- Time zone: UTC+2 (EST)
  - Summer (DST): UTC+3 (EDT)
- Website: Official website

Vadul lui Vodă (Romanian pronunciation: [ˈvadul luj ˈvodə]) is a town in Chișinău municipality, Moldova, situated about 23 km east of the capital on the right (western) bank of the Dniester River. It is the country’s largest spa, recreation, and leisure resort.

Vadul lui Vodă administratively includes the village of Văduleni.

== History and Recreation ==
The settlement of Vadul lui Vodă was first mentioned in historical chronicles in 1432. Its development as a spa and recreational area began after 1945, and in 1968 the village, then home to around 5,000 residents, was granted town status and placed under the authority of the Chișinău Executive Committee.

During the Soviet era, several million tons of sand were brought in to create a wide artificial beach. Today, Vadul lui Vodă has become a popular vacation spot, attracting not only local residents but also many visitors from across Moldova and abroad.

Vadul lui Vodă features an airfield popular for parachute jumping and general aviation. The town’s annual celebration is held on November 8.

== Demographics ==
According to the 2024 census, 4,280 inhabitants lived in Vadul lui Vodă, a decrease compared to the previous census in 2014, when 5,295 inhabitants were registered.

Ethnic composition of Vadul lui Vodă (2024)
1. Moldovans (Note: There is an ongoing controversy regarding the ethnic identification of Moldovans and Romanians.) (81.2%)
2. Romanians (7.70%)
3. Russians (6.50%)
4. Ukrainians (3.60%)
5. Others (0.90%)
Linguistic composition of Vadul lui Vodă (2024)
1. Moldovan (Note: In March 2023, the Parliament of Moldova passed a law updating all legislative texts and the constitution to refer to the national language as Romanian, effectively rendering the term "Moldovan" obsolete.) (56.4%)
2. Romanian (25.2%)
3. Russian (16.2%)
4. Ukrainian (1.80%)
5. Other (0.40%)

Historical population
| Year | Pop. | ±% |
|---|---|---|
| 1970 | 3,906 | — |
| 1979 | 4,676 | +19.7% |
| 1989 | 5,181 | +10.8% |
| 2004 | 4,559 | −12.0% |
| 2014 | 5,295 | +16.1% |
| 2024 | 4,280 | −19.2% |
