= Iuliana Colnic =

Moldovan footballer

Personal information
- Date of birth: 27 July 2004 (age 22)
- Position: Forward

Team information
- Current team: Zimbru

Senior career*
Years	Team	Apps	(Gls)
2020-2021	Universitatea Galați	0	(0)
2021–2022	FC Maksimum Cahul	13	(22)
2022–2023	Noroc	14	(26)
2024	MFA Žalgiris-MRU	19	(11)
2025	Transinvest	14	(3)
2026	Zimbru	1	(1)

International career^{‡}
2019	Moldova U17	3	(0)
2021	Moldova U19	11	(9)
2020–	Moldova	20	(4)
- * Club domestic league appearances and goals as of 25 November 2025 ‡ National team caps and goals as of 31 July 2025

Iuliana Colnic (born 27 July 2004) is a Moldovan footballer who plays as a forward for Lithuanian club MFA Žalgiris-MRU and the Moldova women's national team.

== Club career ==
On 2024 m. she removed to Lithuania and became a member of MFA Žalgiris-MRU.

On 17 March 2024 MFA Žalgiris-MRU won against FK Saned by result 21–0. Iuliana Conic scored seven goals in this match.

== International goals ==
No.	Date	Venue	Opponent	Score	Result	Competition
1.	4 June 2024	Zimbru Stadium, Chișinău, Moldova	North Macedonia	2–3	2–4	UEFA Women's Euro 2025 qualifying
2.	28 October 2024	Stadion Septemvri, Razlog, Bulgaria	North Macedonia	1–0	1–0	Friendly
3.	1 December 2024	Stadionul CPSM, Vadul lui Vodă, Moldova	Armenia	1–0	2–0	Friendly
4.	30 May 2025	Zimbru Stadium, Chișinău, Moldova	Faroe Islands	1–1	1–1	2025 UEFA Women's Nations League C
