= Ludmila Caraman =

Moldovan footballer

Personal information
- Birth name: Ludmila Ninicu
- Date of birth: 27 July 1985 (age 41)
- Positions: Right-back; attacking midfielder

Team information
- Current team: Anenii Noi
- Number: 7

Senior career*
Years	Team	Apps	(Gls)
2005-2006	Codru Chisinau		
2006-2009	Narta Chisinau		
2009-2011	Roma Calfa		
2011-2012	Goliador / ŞS11		
2016-2017	ARF Criuleni		
2017-	Anenii Noi		

International career^{‡}
200?–	Moldova	23	(0)
- * Club domestic league appearances and goals as of 19:45, 30 August 2019 (UTC) ‡ National team caps and goals as of 10 November 2019

Ludmila Caraman (née Ninicu; born 27 July 1985) is a Moldovan footballer who plays as an attacking midfielder for Women's Championship club Anenii Noi and as a right-back for the Moldova women's national team.

== Career ==
Caraman has been capped for the Moldova national team, appearing for the team during the 2019 FIFA Women's World Cup qualifying cycle.

== See also ==
- List of Moldova women's international footballers
