= Ludmila Andone =

Moldovan footballer

Personal information
- Full name: Ludmila Andone
- Date of birth: 29 January 1989 (age 37)
- Place of birth: Moldova
- Position: Midfielder

Team information
- Current team: Anenii Noi
- Number: 27

Senior career*
Years	Team	Apps	(Gls)
2006-2008	Narta Chisinau		
2009	Ryazan-VDV		
2010-2012	Kubanochka Krasnodar		
2012-2013	Donchanka Azoz		
2016-2017	ARF Criuleni		
2017-	Anenii Noi		

International career^{‡}
2015	Moldova	3	(1)
- * Club domestic league appearances and goals ‡ National team caps and goals as of 23:07, 10 April 2015 (UTC)

Ludmila Andone (born 29 January 1989) is a Moldovan footballer who plays as a midfielder for FC Noroc Nimoreni and the Moldova women's national football team.

== See also ==
- List of Moldova women's international footballers
