= Agarista-ȘS Anenii Noi =

- Full name: Agarista-ȘS Anenii Noi
- Ground: Municipal stadium, Anenii Noi
- Capacity: 1,500
- Manager: Iurie Bodiu
- League: Moldovan women's football championship
- 2024–25: Champions
- Website: https://www.facebook.com/agaristaoficial/
Home colours	Away colours

Agarista-ȘS Anenii Noi is a women's football team from Anenii Noi, Moldova. It competes in the Moldovan women's football championship.

They made their European debut in the 2018–19 UEFA Women's Champions League.

== Current squad ==
- As of 30 July 2025, according to UEFA's website''

Note: Flags indicate national team as defined under FIFA eligibility rules; some limited exceptions apply. Players may hold more than one non-FIFA nationality.

No.	Pos.	Nation	Player
1	GK	MDA	Alina Şaitan
2	DF	MDA	Șarlaston Rotari
4	MF	MDA	Daniela Iurcu
6	FW	MDA	Anastasia Toma
7	FW	MDA	Ludmila Caraman
8	GK	MDA	Tatiana Osipov
9	DF	MDA	Cristina Musteață (captain)
10	DF	MDA	Valeria Rusu
11	MF	MDA	Valeria Tataru
12	GK	MDA	Anastasia Nagoreanschi

No.	Pos.	Nation	Player
14	MF	UKR	Yelyzaveta Indycha
15	FW	MDA	Alexandrina Maidanscaia
16	DF	MDA	Dumitrita Ignat
17	FW	MDA	Gabriela Bagrin
19	FW	MDA	Carolina Vasilachi
20	MF	MDA	Simona Meleca
21	DF	MDA	Adela Ceban
24	MF	MDA	Ana Burlea
27	MF	MDA	Ludmila Andone

== Honours ==
- Moldovan Women's Football Championship
  - Winners: (7) 2017–18, 2018–19, 2019–20, 2020–21, 2022–23, 2023–24, 2024–25
- Moldovan Women's Cup
  - Winners: (5) 2017–18, 2018–19, 2019–20, 2021–22, 2022–23, 2023–24, 2024–25

== Record in UEFA competitions ==
All results (home, away and aggregate) list Agarista-ȘS Anenii Noi's goal tally first.

Competition	Round	Club	Home	Away	Aggregate
2018–19	Qualifying round	(Estonia) Pärnu	–	0–2	–
2018–19	Qualifying round	(Bosnia and Herzegovina) Sarajevo (Host)	–	0–5	–
2018–19	Qualifying round	(Albania) Vllaznia	–	1–4	–
2019–20	Qualifying round	(Serbia) Spartak Subotica	–	0–12	–
2019–20	Qualifying round	(Hungary) Ferencváros	–	0–2	–
2019–20	Qualifying round	(Slovakia) Slovan Bratislava (Host)	–	0–1	–
2020–21	Qualifying rounds	(Serbia) Spartak Subotica	–	0–4	–
2021–22	Qualifying rounds	(Greece) PAOK	–	0–6	–
2022–23	Qualifying rounds	(Netherlands) Twente	–	0–13	–
2023–24	Qualifying rounds	(Belarus) Dinamo Minsk	–	0–9	–
2024–25	Qualifying rounds	(Lithuania) FC Gintra (Host)	–	0–5	-
2024–25	Qualifying rounds	(Finland) KuPS	–	0–6	–
2025–26	Qualifying rounds	(Malta) Swieqi United	–	0–5	-
2025–26	Qualifying rounds	(Montenegro) Budućnost Podgorica	–	0–3	–
