= PGU ȘS4-FC Alga Tiraspol =

- Full name: PGU Școala Sportivă 4 – FC Alga Tiraspol
- Founded: 1 November 2009
- League: Moldovan championship
- 2018-19: 7th

PGU ȘS4-FC Alga Tiraspol is a women's football club from Tiraspol, Moldova. It plays in the country's top-level league.

== Titles ==
- Moldovan Women's Cup
  - Winners (3): 2009–10, 2012–13, 2014–15
