= Cioburciu, Transnistria =

Cioburciu Чобручи (Ukrainian)
- Village
- Location within Moldova
- Coordinates: 46°41′6″N 29°44′51″E
- Country (de jure): Moldova
- Country (de facto): Transnistria (Note: Transnistria's political status is disputed. It considers itself to be an independent state, but this is not recognised by any UN member state. The Moldovan government and the international community consider Transnistria a part of Moldova's territory.)
- Elevation: 9 m (30 ft)
- Time zone: UTC+2 (EET)
  - Summer (DST): UTC+3 (EEST)

Cioburciu (Moldovan Cyrillic: Чобурчию, Russian: Чобручи, romanized: Chobruchi, Ukrainian: Чобручі, romanized: Choburchi, Hungarian: Csöbörcsök) is a village in the Slobozia District of Transnistria, Moldova. It has since 1990 been administered as a part of the breakaway Pridnestrovian Moldavian Republic (PMR).

According to the unofficial census of 2004, the population of the village was 7,176 inhabitants, of which 6,214 (86.59%) Moldovans (Romanians), 457 (6.36%) Ukrainians and 436 (6.07%) Russians.

During the 2025 Moldovan energy crisis, a retired couple died in Cioborciu from carbon monoxide poisoning after leaving a stove on and going to sleep.

== Climate ==
Cioburciu has a humid continental climate (Köppen: Dfb)

Climate data for Cioburciu
Month	Jan	Feb	Mar	Apr	May	Jun	Jul	Aug	Sep	Oct	Nov	Dec	Year
Daily mean °C (°F)	−2.0 (28.4)	−1.0 (30.2)	3.0 (37.4)	10.1 (50.2)	16.0 (60.8)	19.9 (67.8)	21.8 (71.2)	21.4 (70.5)	16.9 (62.4)	11.0 (51.8)	5.3 (41.5)	1.0 (33.8)	10.3 (50.5)
Average precipitation mm (inches)	35 (1.4)	35 (1.4)	28 (1.1)	34 (1.3)	45 (1.8)	64 (2.5)	62 (2.4)	40 (1.6)	41 (1.6)	25 (1.0)	37 (1.5)	38 (1.5)	484 (19.1)
Source: Climate-Data.org

== Notable people ==
- Larisa Șavga (born 1962), Moldovan economist, former Minister of Education and Youth
