= Ratuș =

- Commune
- Location within Moldova
- Coordinates: 47.5358333333°N 28.5044444444°E
- Country: Moldova
- District: Telenești District

Population (2014)
  - Total: 1,743
- Time zone: UTC+2 (EET)
  - Summer (DST): UTC+3 (EEST)

Ratuș is a commune in Telenești District, Moldova. It is composed of five villages: Mîndra, Ratuș, Sărătenii Noi, Zăicani and Zăicanii Noi.

== Notable people ==
- Adrian Efros
