= Moldova women's national football team =

Women's national association football team representing Moldova

Moldova
- Nickname: Acvile (The Aquilas)
- Association: Moldovan Football Federation (FMF)
- Confederation: UEFA (Europe)
- Head coach: Ghenadie Pușca
- Captain: Natalia Munteanu
- FIFA code: MDA
First colours	Second colours

FIFA ranking
- Current: 122 ▼3 (20 October 2026)
- Highest: 81 (December 2017)
- Lowest: 133 (April 2026 – June 2026)

First international
- Romania 4–1 SSR Moldova (Bucharest, Romania; 10 September 1990)

Biggest win
- Moldova 4–0 Andorra (Vilnius, Lithuania; 6 April 2017); Gibraltar 0–4 Moldova (Gibraltar; 3 June 2025)

Biggest defeat
- Switzerland 15–0 Moldova (Lausanne, Switzerland; 6 September 2022)

The Moldova women's national football team (Romanian: Echipa națională de fotbal feminin a Moldovei) represents Moldova in association football and is controlled by the Moldovan Football Federation, the governing body for football in Moldova. They have never qualified for the FIFA Women's World Cup or the UEFA Women's Championship. Ghenadie Pușca has been the manager of the national team since 1 March 2024. The current captain of the national team is goalkeeper Natalia Munteanu. The team plays their home games in many different venues all around the country, including Chișinău, Orhei and Nisporeni.

== History ==
Moldova first official match, a 0–4 defeat to Republic of Ireland, took place on 12 September 2001.

== Results and fixtures ==
Legend

Win Draw Lose Fixture

=== 2025 ===
2 December 2025 Friendly	Romania	2–0	Moldova	Voluntari, Romania
	Bălăceanu 3'; Ciolacu 39'	Report		Stadium: Anghel Iordănescu Stadium; Referee: Réka Molnar (Hungary)

=== 2026 ===
3 March 2026 2027 FIFA World Cup qualifying League C	Romania	1–0	Moldova	Bucharest, Romania
	Bălăceanu 54'	Report		Stadium: Arcul de Triumf Stadium; Attendance: 560; Referee: Sofiya Prychyna (Ukraine)

14 April 2026 2027 FIFA World Cup qualifying League C	Moldova	0–0	Cyprus	Nisporeni, Moldova
		Report		Stadium: Stadionul Central Nisporeni; Attendance: 305; Referee: Natálie Čampišová (Czech Republic)

18 April 2026 Friendly	Greece	1–1	Moldova	Athens, Greece
	Paterna 60'	Report	Rubanovici 90'	Stadium: Nea Smyrni Stadium; Attendance: 240; Referee: Roxana Timiș (Romania)

5 June 2026 2027 FIFA World Cup qualifying League C	Moldova	0–0	Romania	Nisporeni, Moldova
		Report		Stadium: Stadionul Central Nisporeni; Attendance: 548; Referee: Sapir Gaya Berman (Israel)

9 June 2026 2027 FIFA World Cup qualifying League C	Cyprus	0–2	Moldova	Dasaki Achnas, Cyprus
		Report	Țabur 62'; Colesnicenco 86'	Stadium: Ethnikos Achnas Stadium; Attendance: 254; Referee: Charlotte Carpenter (Wales)

9 October Friendly	Moldova	1–0	Georgia	Chișinău, Moldova
17:00	Colesnicenco 67'	Report		Stadium: Stadionul Zimbru; Referee: Ana Maria Terteleac (Romania)

12 October Friendly	Moldova	0–1	Georgia	Chișinău, Moldova
17:00		Report	Daniela 65'	Stadium: Stadionul Zimbru; Referee: Ana Maria Terteleac (Romania)

2 December Friendly	Montenegro	v	Moldova	Podgorica, Montenegro
13:00		Report

5 December Friendly	Montenegro	v	Moldova	Podgorica, Montenegro
13:00		Report

=== 2027 ===
2 March 2027 UEFA Women's Nations League C	Cyprus	v	Moldova	Cyprus
		Report

20 April 2027 UEFA Women's Nations League C	Moldova	v	Malta	Moldova
		Report

11 June 2027 UEFA Women's Nations League C	Moldova	v	Cyprus	Moldova
		Report

15 June 2027 UEFA Women's Nations League C	Malta	v	Moldova	Malta
		Report

=== 2027 FIFA World Cup qualification ===
==== Group C5 ====
Pos	Team	Pld	W	D	L	GF	GA	GD	Pts	Promotion or qualification
1	Romania (P)	4	3	1	0	8	0	+8	10	Advance to play-offs and promotion to League B
2	Moldova	4	1	2	1	2	1	+1	5	
3	Cyprus	4	0	1	3	0	9	−9	1	

Source: UEFA
Rules for classification: Tiebreakers
(P) Promoted

== Coaching staff ==
=== Current coaching staff ===
As of 17 February 2026

Role	Name
Head coach	Ghenadie Pușca
Assistant coach	Elena Subbotina
Goalkeeping coach	Anatolie Chirinciuc

== Players ==
=== Current squad ===
The following players were named for the friendly match against Romania on 2 December 2025.

Caps and goals are correct as of 2 December 2025. Only official matches are included.

No.	Pos.	Player	Date of birth (age)	Caps	Goals	Club
1	GK	Margarita Panova	31 January 1998 (age 28)	21	0	(Lithuanian Football Federation) TransInvest
12	GK	Natalia Munteanu (captain)	1 December 1993 (age 32)	43	3	(Turkish Football Federation) Fenerbahçe
23	GK	Denisa Bojenco	28 January 1998 (age 28)	0	0	(Italian Football Federation) Matera
2	DF	Dumitrița Prisacari	17 January 1994 (age 32)	25	0	(Ukrainian Association of Football) SeaSters
5	DF	Andreea Costin	22 August 2002 (age 24)	9	0	(Austrian Football Association) Rankweil
6	DF	Anastasia Sivolobova	14 August 1998 (age 28)	49	1	(Kazakhstan Football Federation) Aktobe
9	DF	Daniela Mardari	2 June 2001 (age 25)	34	1	(Romanian Football Federation) Vasas
15	DF	Valeria Vîrlan	4 December 2004 (age 21)	15	0	(Moldovan Football Federation) Zimbru Chișinău
16	DF	Nadejda Colesnicenco	28 June 1996 (age 30)	20	0	(Romanian Football Federation) Politehnica Timișoara
3	MF	Cristina Cerescu	6 March 1995 (age 31)	50	1	(Romanian Football Federation) Gloria Bistrița
7	MF	Carina Doiban	4 July 2002 (age 24)	20	0	(Romanian Football Federation) Atletic Olimpia Gherla
10	MF	Carolina Țabur	28 December 1998 (age 27)	52	6	(Romanian Football Federation) Atletic Olimpia Gherla
14	MF	Elina Coceanovschi	14 September 2003 (age 23)	18	1	(Romanian Football Federation) Unirea Alba Iulia
17	MF	Anastasia Cernitu	10 May 2004 (age 22)	15	0	(Lithuanian Football Federation) TransInvest
18	MF	Natalia Tutunaru	26 August 2002 (age 24)	1	0	(Italian Football Federation) Rambla C11 Femminile
19	MF	Vanessa Manoil	14 January 2005 (age 21)	8	0	(United States Soccer Federation) Daytona State College
21	MF	Lia Vlas	7 November 2001 (age 25)	3	0	(Romanian Football Federation) Vasas
22	FW	Victoria Rubanovici	21 February 2008 (age 18)	7	0	(Romanian Football Federation) Gloria Bistrița
23	FW	Milena Tihonciuc	19 May 1995 (age 31)	1	0	(Football Federation of Belarus) Belshina Bobruisk
24	FW	Veronica Cojuhari	3 October 1998 (age 28)	30	2	(Slovak Football Association) Tatran Prešov
25	FW	Iuliana Colnic	27 July 2004 (age 22)	20	4	Free agent

=== Recent call-ups ===
The following players have been called up to the squad in the past 12 months.

Pos.	Player	Date of birth (age)	Caps	Goals	Club	Latest call-up
DF	Mădălina Bădiceanu	1 December 2003 (age 22)	15	0	(Italy) Matera	v. Georgia, 27 October 2025
MF	Claudia Chiper	16 June 1995 (age 31)	55	6	(Romania) Farul Constanța	v. Georgia, 27 October 2025
FW	Victoria Pîslari	26 November 1993 (age 32)	0	0	(United States) College of Idaho	v. Georgia, 27 October 2025
^{INJ} Player withdrew from the squad due to an injury.^{PRE} Preliminary squad.^{SUS} Player is serving a suspension.^{WD} Player withdrew for personal reasons.

== Competitive record ==
=== FIFA Women's World Cup ===
FIFA Women's World Cup									Qualification record										
Year	Round	Position	Pld	W	D	L	GF	GA	Pld	W	D	L	GF	GA	LG	RK	P/R	Campaign	
1991 to 1999	Did not enter								—						—			—	
(United States) 2003	Unable to qualify								6	1	0	5	3	22	—			2003	
(China) 2007	Unable to qualify								6	1	0	5	5	13	—			2007	
2011 to 2015	Did not enter								—						—			—	
(France) 2019	Did not qualify								11	2	2	7	8	45	—			2019	2019
(Australia) (New Zealand) 2023	Did not qualify								10	0	1	9	1	49	—			2023	
(Brazil) 2027	Did not qualify								4	1	2	1	2	1	C	43rd	(Note: From 2027 World Cup onwards a new qualifying format was introduced, linked to the Women's Nations League where teams are divided into leagues with promotion/relegation between the leagues at the end of each cycle.)	2027	
(Costa Rica) (Jamaica) (Mexico) (United States) 2031	To be determined								To be determined										
(England) (Northern Ireland) (Scotland) (Wales) 2035	To be determined								To be determined										
Total									37	5	5	27	19	130				0/5	

=== UEFA Women's Championship ===
UEFA Women's Championship									Qualification record										
Year	Round	Position	Pld	W	D	L	GF	GA	Pld	W	D	L	GF	GA	LG	RK	P/R	Campaign	
1984 to 2013	Did not enter								—						—			—	
(Netherlands) 2017	Did not qualify								11	2	0	9	6	34	—			2017	2017
(England) 2022	Did not qualify								8	1	0	7	3	43	—			2022	
(Switzerland) 2025	Did not qualify								6	0	1	5	4	15	C	49th	(Note: From Euro 2025 onwards a new qualifying format was introduced, linked to the Women's Nations League where teams are divided into leagues with promotion/relegation between the leagues at the end of each cycle.)	2025	
(Germany) 2029	To be determined								To be determined										
Total									25	3	1	21	13	92				0/3	

=== UEFA Women's Nations League ===
UEFA Women's Nations League record									Promotion/relegation play-offs						
Season	League	Pld	W	D	L	GF	GA	RK	Pld	W	D	L	GF	GA	P/R
2023–24	C	6	0	3	3	4	12	49th	—N/a						Same position
2025	C	6	2	1	3	6	6	48th	—N/a						Same position
2027	C	0	0	0	0	0	0		—N/a						
Total		12	2	4	6	10	18								

▲	Promoted at end of season
Same position	No movement at end of season
▼	Relegated at end of season

=== By competition ===
Competition	Pld	W	D	L	GF	GA	GD	Win %	Loss %
FIFA Women's World Cup qualification	37	5	5	27	19	130	−111	13.51	72.97
UEFA Women's Championship qualification	25	3	1	21	13	92	−79	12	84
UEFA Women's Nations League	12	2	4	6	10	18	−8	16.67	50
Total	74	10	10	54	42	240	−198	13.51	72.97

== Individual records ==
As of 3 June 2025
Players in bold are still active with Moldova.

=== Most appearances ===
Rank	Player	Caps	Goals	Position	Career
1	**Claudia Chiper**	55	6	MF	2015–present
2	**Carolina Țabur**	52	6	MF	2015–present
2	**Cristina Cerescu**	50	1	DF	2015–present
4	**Anastasia Sivolobova**	49	1	DF	2017–present
5	**Nadejda Colesnicenco**	43	2	MF	2015–present
6	**Natalia Munteanu**	38	4	GK	2015–present
7	Violeta Mițul	35	0	MF	2015–2023
8	**Irina Topal**	32	2	MF	2015–present
9	**Daniela Mardari**	34	1	DF	2019–present
10	**Anastasia Toma**	33	5	MF	2015–present

=== Top goalscorers ===
Rank	Player	Goals	Caps	Career
1	**Claudia Chiper**	6	55	2015–present
1	**Carolina Țabur**	6	52	2015–present
3	**Anastasia Toma**	5	38	2015–present
4	**Iuliana Colnic**	4	20	2020–present
5	**Natalia Munteanu**	3	43	2015–present
6	Eugenia Miron	2	9	2015–2019
6	**Nadejda Colesnicenco**	2	43	2015–present
6	Ludmila Caraman	2	22	2015–2021
6	Ludmila Andone	2	12	2015–2018
6	**Irina Topal**	2	33	2015–present
6	Anastasia Slonova	2	11	2001–2006
6	Veronica Cojuhari	2	30	2019–

== Head-to-head record ==
Friendly games are not included and correct as of last competitive match played on 9 June 2026.

Opponents	Pld	W	D	L	GF	GA	GD
Andorra	3	1	1	1	5	2	+3
Azerbaijan	2	1	0	1	3	2	+1
Belgium	2	0	0	2	0	19	−19
Croatia	2	0	0	2	0	5	−5
Cyprus	2	1	1	0	2	0	+2
Czechia	2	0	0	2	0	14	−14
Denmark	2	0	0	2	0	9	−9
Estonia	2	1	0	1	5	4	+1
Faroe Islands	2	0	1	1	1	3	−2
Gibraltar	2	2	0	0	5	0	+5
Greece	2	1	0	1	2	4	−2
Ireland	2	0	0	2	0	10	−10
Israel	3	0	1	2	0	3	−3
Italy	4	0	0	4	1	19	−18
Latvia	5	0	1	4	4	12	−8
Lithuania	4	2	1	1	5	5	0
Luxembourg	1	1	0	0	3	0	+3
Malta	2	0	1	1	0	2	−2
North Macedonia	2	0	1	1	3	5	−2
Poland	4	0	0	4	1	15	−14
Portugal	2	0	0	2	0	15	−15
Romania	6	0	2	4	1	11	−10
Slovakia	4	0	0	4	0	11	−11
Slovenia	2	0	0	2	0	7	−7
Spain	2	0	0	2	0	19	−19
Sweden	2	0	0	2	0	9	−9
Switzerland	2	0	0	2	0	21	−21
Wales	2	0	0	2	0	6	−6
FR Yugoslavia	2	0	0	2	1	8	−7
Total	74	10	10	54	42	240	−198

== See also ==
- Moldova women's national under-19 football team
- Moldova women's national under-17 football team
