= Anenii Noi =

- City
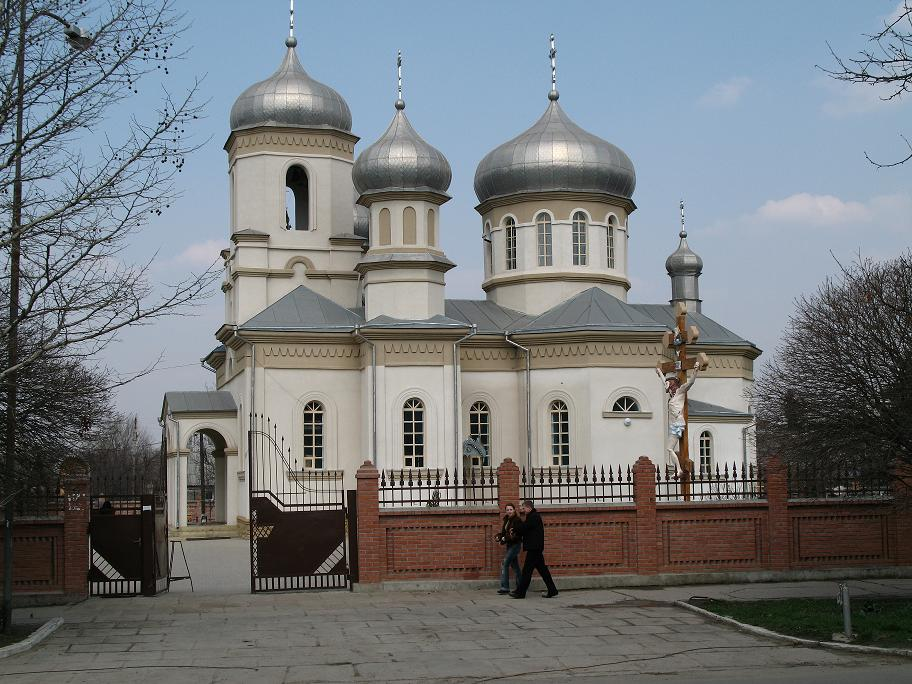
- Church of St. Dumitru

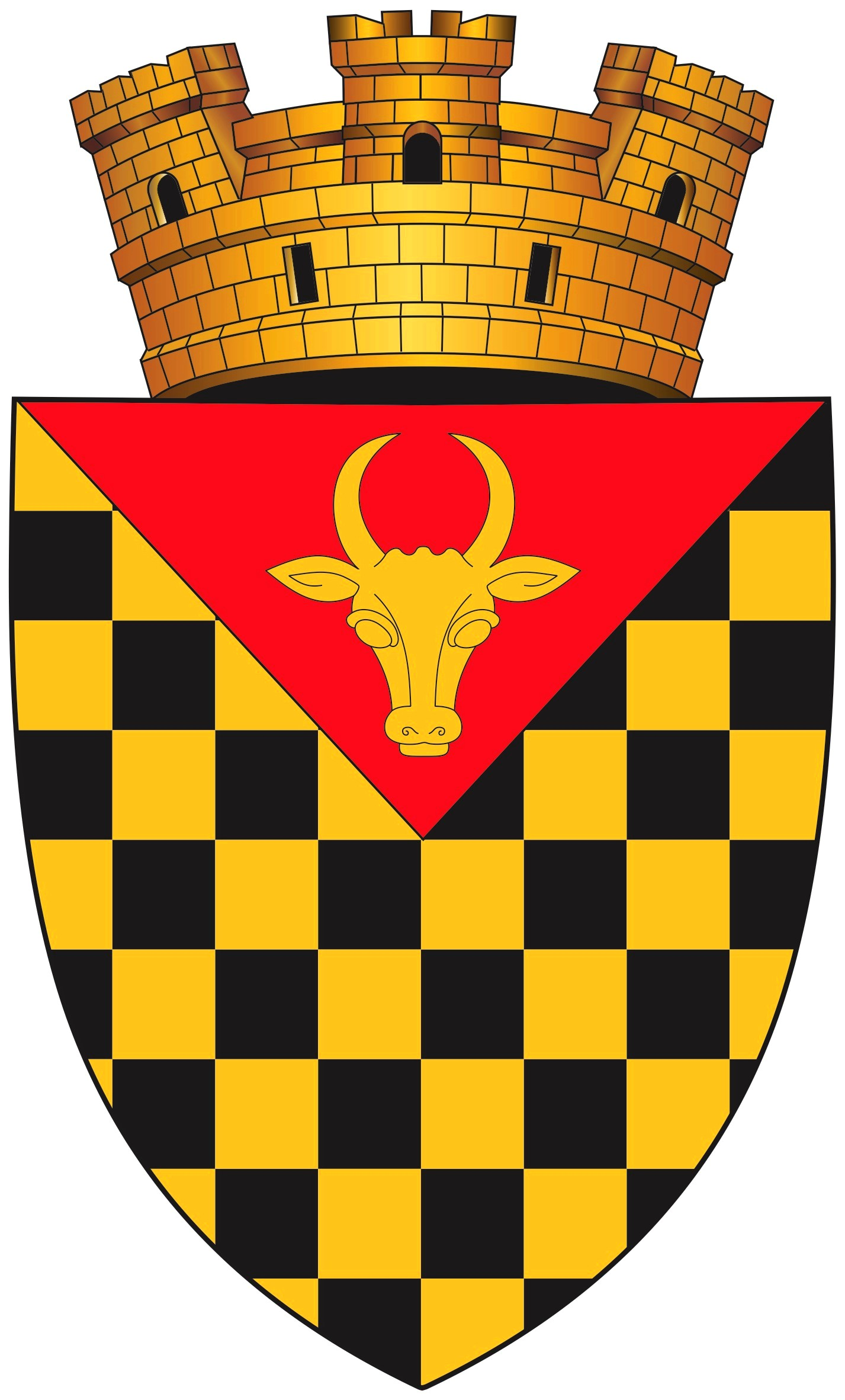
- Flag Seal

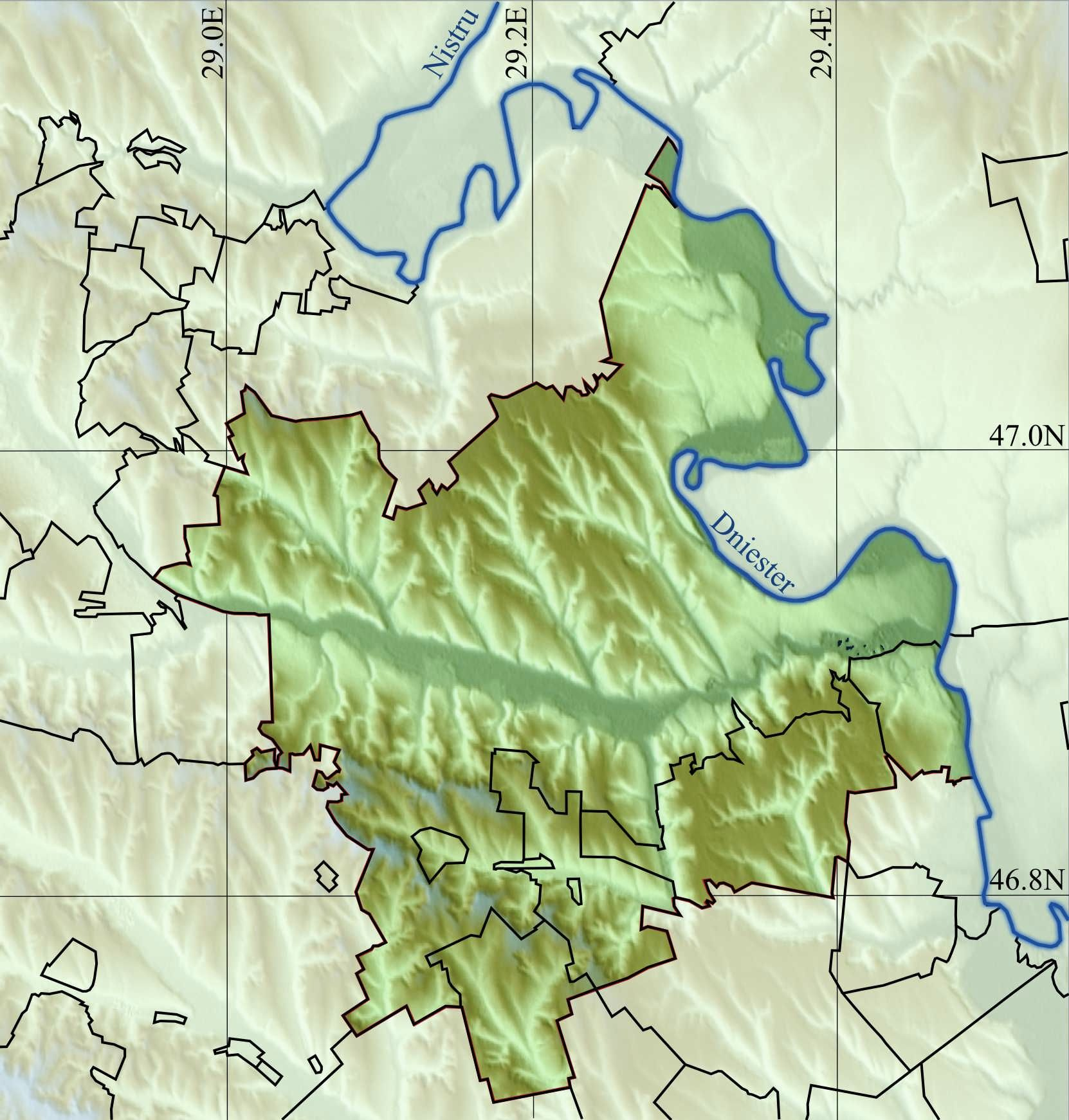
- Location of the village within Anenii Noi District Location of the village within Moldova
- Coordinates: 46°53′N 29°13′E
- Country: Moldova
- Raion (District): Anenii Noi District

Government
  - Mayor: Alexandr Mațarin (PAS)
- Elevation: 39 m (128 ft)

Population (2014)
  - Total: 10,872
- Time zone: UTC+2 (Eastern European Time)
  - Summer (DST): UTC+3 (Eastern European Time)
- Postcode: MD-6500, MD-6501
- Climate: Cfb
- Website: anenii-noi.com

Anenii Noi (Romanian pronunciation: [aˈnenij ˈnoj]) is a city in east-central Moldova, the seat of Anenii Noi District. It is located 36 km (22 mi) SE of the capital, Chișinău.

According to the 2004 census, the city administers an area inhabited by 11,463 people. This area consists of the city itself, population 8,358, and five suburb villages: Albiniţa, population 370, Beriozchi, population 647, Hîrbovăţul Nou, population 484, Ruseni, population 1,090, and Socoleni, population 514. Of the 10,872 recorded in the 2014 census, 6,756 are Moldovans, 1,894 Ukrainians, 1,427 Russians, 294 Romanians, 81 Gagauzians, 200 Bulgarians, and 33 Roma. At the 1930 census, there were two localities: Anenii Noi, population 661 (558 Bessarabian Germans, 30 Russians, 19 Romanians, and 4 Poles), and Anenii Vechi, population 990 (891 Russians, 74 Romanians, 19 Germans, 4 Jews, and 2 Bulgarians) in Plasa Bulboaca of Tighina County.

There are several supermarkets in the city such as Linella, Local, Cip Market, Admiral. There is also a Central market, bank branches, small shops (winemaking, confectionery, pastries, stationery). Transportation is available to Anenii Noi every half-hour from Chișinău.

== International relations ==
=== Twin towns – Sister cities ===
Anenii Noi is twinned with:

- Korosten, Ukraine
- Babruysk, Belarus

== Notable people ==
Ivan Demyan — musician, author-performer, leader of the Russian rock band "7B".

== Gallery ==
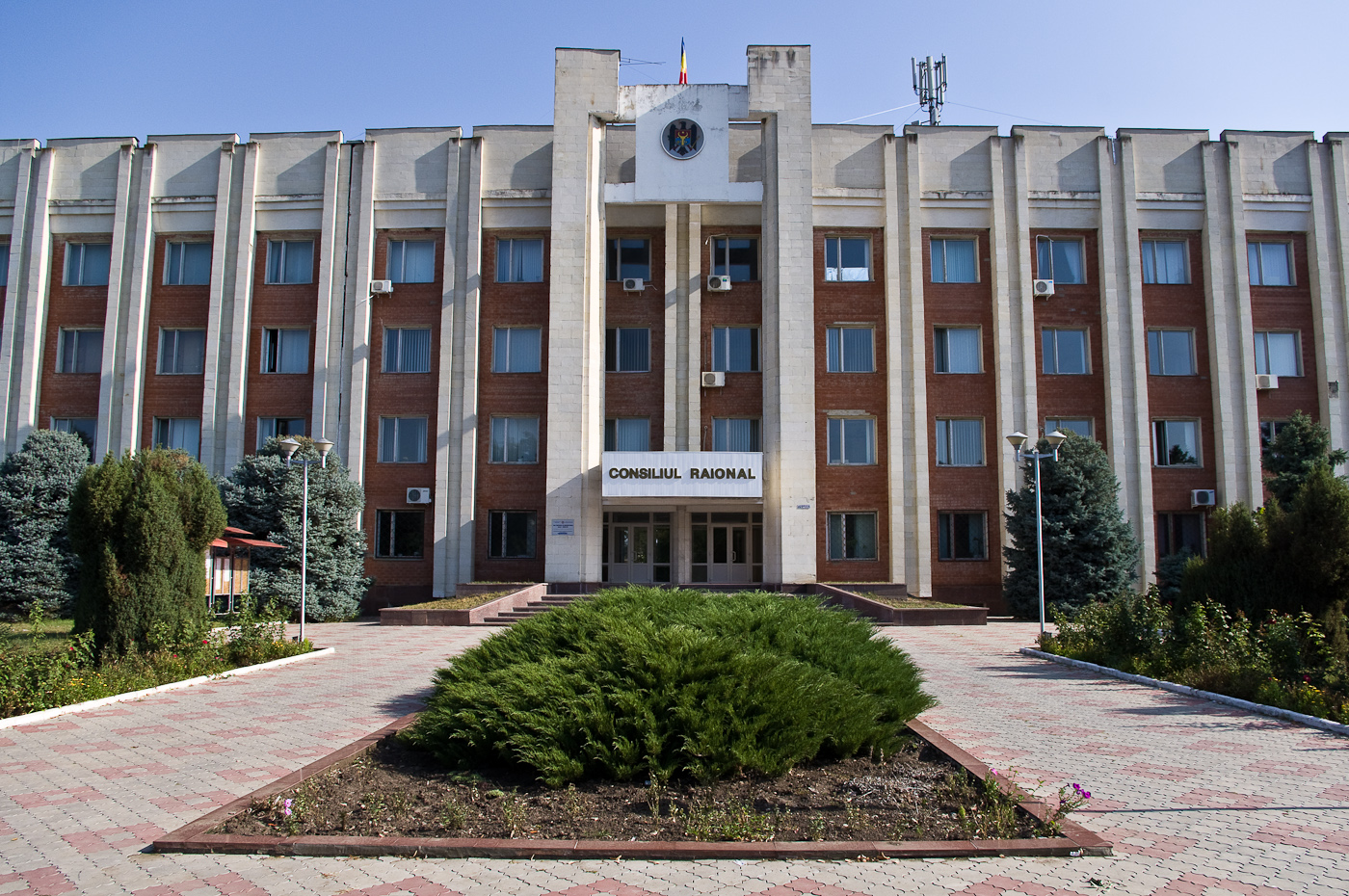
District Council

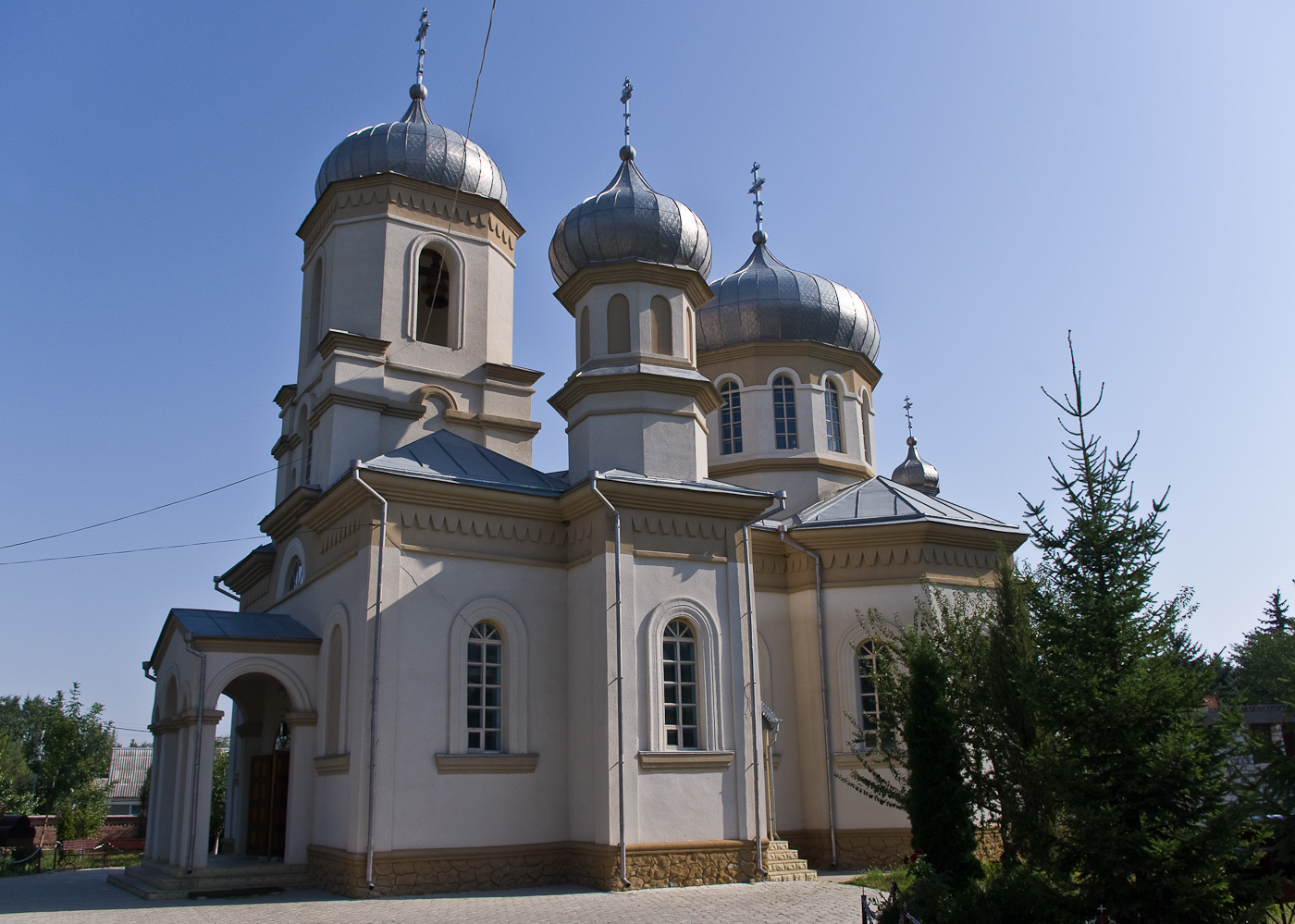
St. Demetrius Church

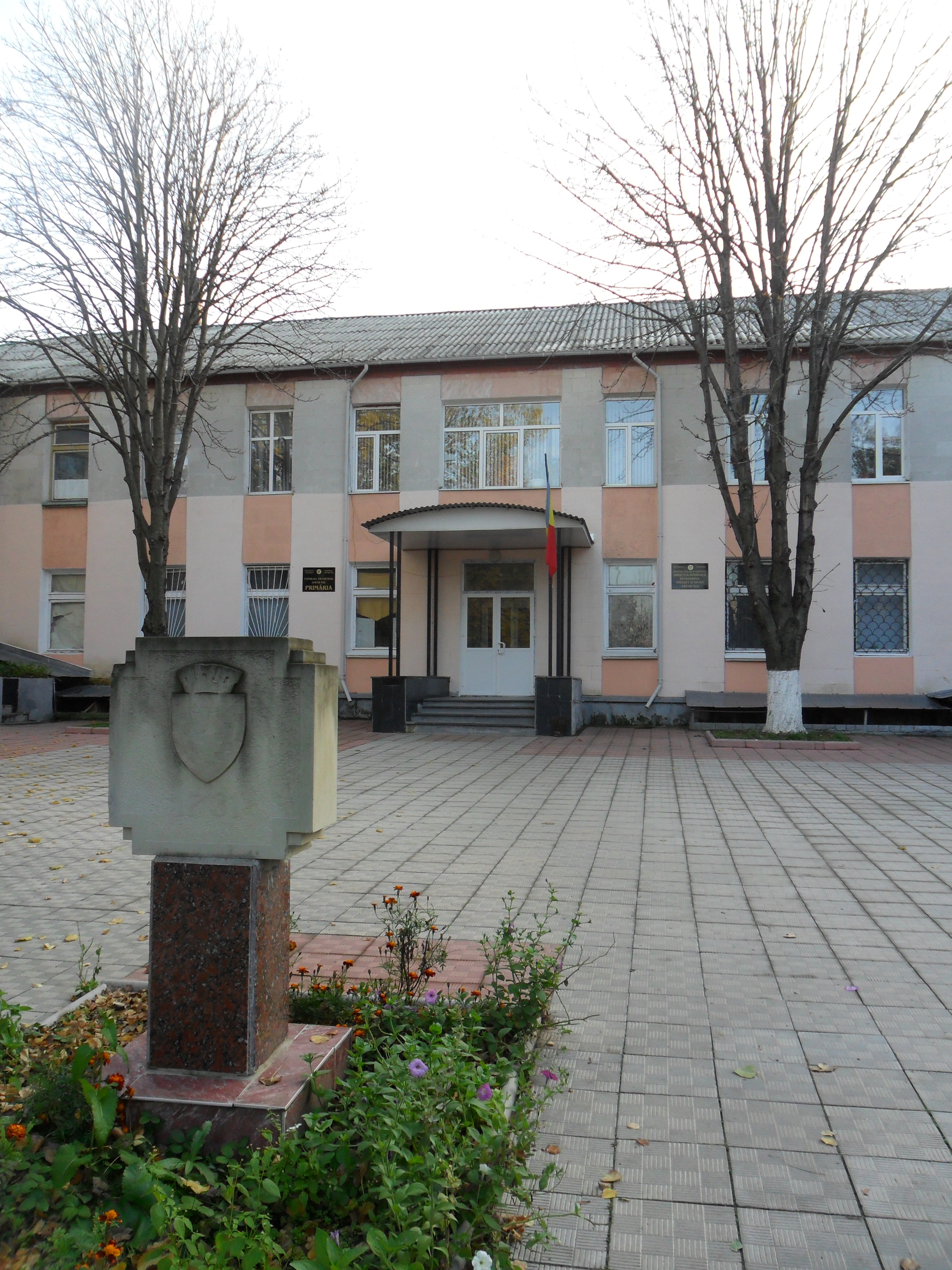
Town Hall

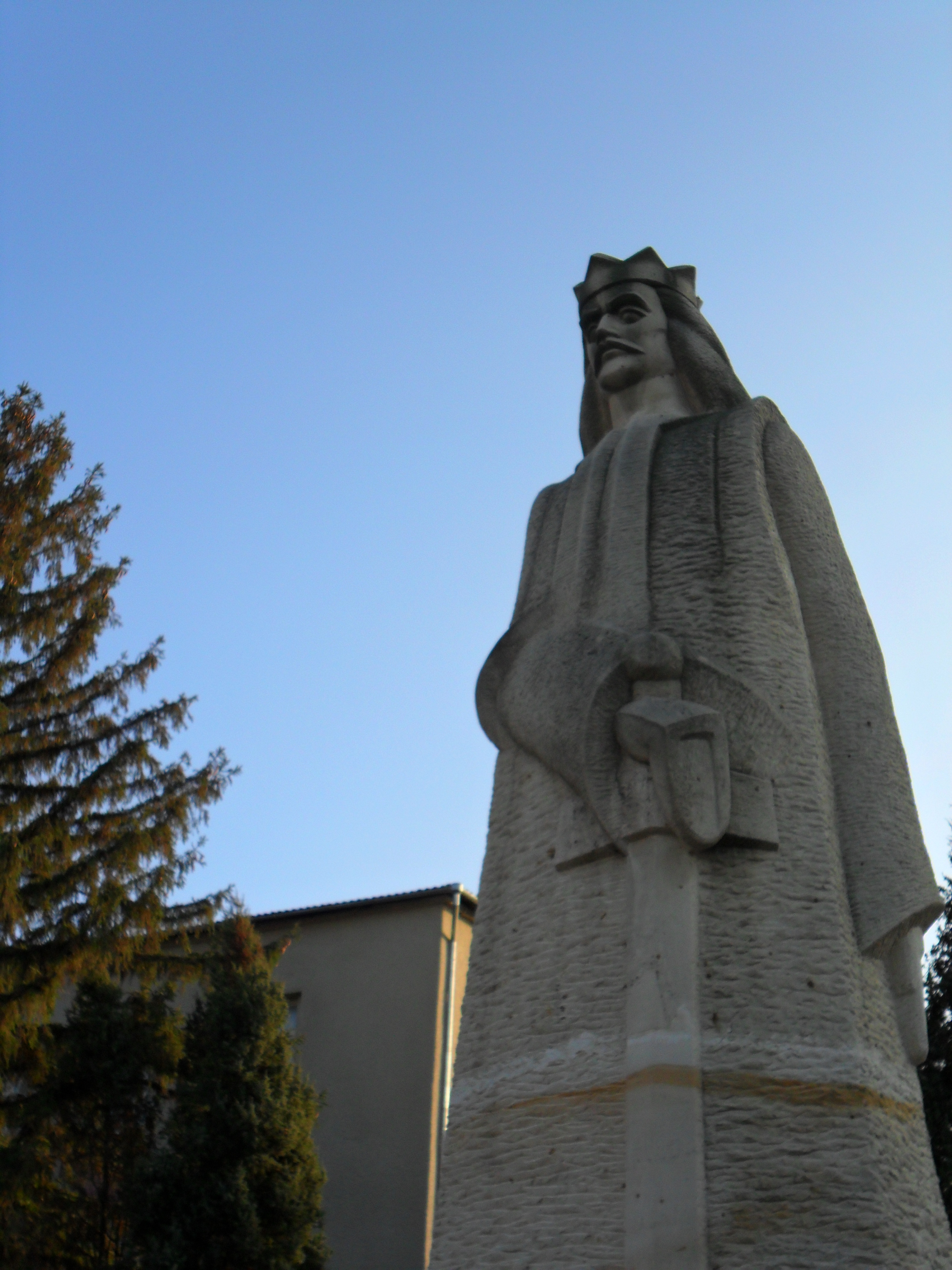
Monument to Stephen the Great
