= 2016–17 Moldovan Women Top League =

Moldovan Women Top League
- Season: 2016–17
- Champions: Noroc Nimoreni

The 2016–17 Moldovan Women Top League season in association football was the 17th since its establishment. A total of 8 teams contested the league. The season began on 3 September 2016 and ended on 4 June 2017.
ARF Criuleni were the defending champions, but withdrawn their team from the league on 13 October 2016 and their results from this season were annulled.

== Stadia and locations ==
Location of the Top League 2016–17 teams.

Club	Location	Stadium
ȘS 11-Real Succes	Chișinău	Stadionul Real Succes Chișinău
Noroc	Nimoreni	Stadionul Sătesc Nimoreni
PGU ȘS4-Alga	Tiraspol	Stadionul Municipal ȘS4 Tiraspol
Narta-ȘS	Drăsliceni	Stadionul Sătesc Ratuș
LTPS-2	Chișinău	Stadionul Sătesc Nimoreni
Belceanka	Bălți	Stadionul Școlii Sportive Bălți
Maksimum	Cahul	Stadionul Raional Atlant Cahul
ARF	Criuleni	Stadionul Raional Criuleni

== Format ==
The schedule consists of three rounds. During the first two rounds, each team plays each other once home and away for a total of 12 matches. The pairings of the third round will then be set according to the standings after the first two rounds, giving every team a third game against each opponent for a total of 18 games per team.

== League table ==
Pos	Team	Pld	W	D	L	GF	GA	GD	Pts	Qualification
1	Noroc Nimoreni (C)	18	14	1	3	72	17	+55	43	Qualification to Champions League qualifying round
2	LTPS-2 Chișinău	18	11	3	4	48	34	+14	36	
3	PGU ȘS4-Alga Tiraspol	18	10	2	6	55	41	+14	32	
4	ȘS 11-Real Succes Chișinău	18	8	4	6	31	15	+16	28	
5	Belceanka Bălți	18	7	4	7	34	32	+2	25	
6	Narta-ȘS Drăsliceni	18	3	4	11	26	59	−33	13	
7	Maksimum Cahul	18	1	0	17	16	84	−68	3	

Source: FMF, UEFA
Rules for classification: 1) Points; 2) Head-to-head points; 3) Head-to-head goal difference; 4) Goal difference; 5) Goals scored; 6) Matches won; 7) Fairplay ranking.
(C) Champions

== Results ==
=== First and second round ===
Home \ Away	BEL	NOR	PGU	REA	MAK	NAR	LTP
Belceanka Bălți		1–0	0–1	0–0	6–1	7–0	2–2
Noroc Nimoreni	4–0		11–2	0–1	5–0	3–3	8–0
PGU ȘS4-Alga Tiraspol	3–1	2–4		0–3	9–1	8–0	5–1
ȘS 11-Real Succes Chișinău	1–1	1–5	0–1		5–0	1–1	0–1
Maksimum Cahul	1–2	0–4	3–6	0–6		4–0	1–3
Narta-ȘS Drăsliceni	1–2	0–5	2–0	0–2	3–0		2–2
LTPS-2 Chișinău	2–1	0–4	1–0	1–0	8–1	4–0	

Updated to match(es) played on unknown. Source: FMF
Legend: Blue = home team win; Yellow = draw; Red = away team win.

=== Third round ===
Home \ Away	BEL	NOR	PGU	REA	MAK	NAR	LTP
Belceanka Bălți		2–5	2–2			5–3	
Noroc Nimoreni				2–1		3–1	2–0
PGU ȘS4-Alga Tiraspol		3–2		2–1		2–2	
ȘS 11-Real Succes Chișinău	1–0				4–0		0–0
Maksimum Cahul	0–1	0–5	2–4				
Narta-ȘS Drăsliceni				1–4	5–1		2–6
LTPS-2 Chișinău	5–1		5–4		7–1		

Updated to match(es) played on unknown. Source: FMF
Legend: Blue = home team win; Yellow = draw; Red = away team win.
