= 2015–16 Moldovan Women Top League =

Sports season

Moldovan Women Top League
- Season: 2015–16
- Champions: ARF Criuleni
- Matches: 60
- Goals: 371 (6.18 per match)
- All statistics correct as of 3 April 2016.

The 2015–16 Moldovan Women Top League season in association football is the 16th since its establishment. A total of 8 teams contested the league.

The season began on 31 August 2015 and ended on 25 May 2016. CS Noroc Nimoreni were the defending champions.

== Teams ==
Location of the Top League 2015–16 teams.

Club	Location
Real Succes-ŞS 11	Chişinău
CS Noroc Nimoreni	Nimoreni
PGU ŞS4-FC Alga Tiraspol	Tiraspol
FC Narta ȘS Drăsliceni	Ratuş
LTPS nr.2-Academia Nimoreni	Nimoreni
ȘS Bălți	Bălți
FC Maximum Cahul	Cahul
ARF Criuleni	Criuleni

== Format ==
Teams play each other three times for a total of 21 matches each. After playing 14 matches, the top four teams will play 4 of their remaining 7 fixtures at home.

== League table ==
Pos	Team	Pld	W	D	L	GF	GA	GD	Pts	Qualification or relegation
1	ARF Criuleni (Q, C)	21	18	1	2	128	13	+115	55	Qualification to Champions League
2	CS Noroc Nimoreni	21	18	0	3	138	8	+130	54	
3	PGU ȘS4-FC Alga Tiraspol	21	15	2	4	109	14	+95	47	
4	Real Succes-ŞS 11	21	13	1	7	48	27	+21	40	
5	ȘS Bălți	21	5	2	14	27	63	−36	17	
6	LTPS nr.2-Academia Nimoreni	21	4	1	16	16	98	−82	13	
7	FC Narta ȘS Drăsliceni	21	4	1	16	11	120	−109	13	
8	FC Maximum Cahul	21	2	2	17	14	149	−135	8	

Updated to match(es) played on 22 April 2016. Source: Moldovan Football Federation (in Romanian)
Rules for classification: 1) Points; 2) Goal difference; 3) Number of goals scored
(C) Champions; (Q) Qualified for the phase indicated

== Results ==
Home and away rounds

Home \ Away	BĂL	CRI	LTP	MAX	NAR	NOR	PGU	REA
ȘS Bălți		1–6	2–0	1–1	5–0	1–3	0–6	1–3
ARF Criuleni	5–1		7–0	13–0	9–0	0–3	2–0	1–0
LTPS nr.2-Academia Nimoreni	2–1	0–6		0–1	0–1	0–2	0–10	0–1
FC Maximum Cahul	0–4	1–10	0–4		2–2	0–22	0–9	2–3
FC Narta ȘS Drăsliceni	1–3	0–16	0–4	1–4		0–8	0–10	0–3
CS Noroc Nimoreni	10–0	1–2	22–0	12–0	13–0		1–2	4–0
PGU ȘS4-FC Alga Tiraspol	3–0	2–2	7–0	22–1	8–0	2–1		3–1
Real Succes-ŞS 11	4–1	0–2	4–0	7–0	4–0	1–5	0–0	

Updated to match(es) played on 27 March 2016. Source: Moldovan Football Federation (in Romanian)
Legend: Blue = home team win; Yellow = draw; Red = away team win.

3rd leg rounds

Home \ Away	BĂL	CRI	LTP	MAX	NAR	NOR	PGU	REA
ȘS Bălți		1–8	2–2			0–1		
ARF Criuleni			20–0		6–1		3–0	2–1
LTPS nr.2-Academia Nimoreni				3–0			0–3	1–3
FC Maximum Cahul	2–3	0–9				0–10		
FC Narta ȘS Drăsliceni	2–0		1–0	2–0				
CS Noroc Nimoreni		1–0	5–0		8–0			5–0
PGU ȘS4-FC Alga Tiraspol	3–0			7–0	12–0	0–1		
Real Succes-ŞS 11	1–0			5–0	5–0		2–0	

Updated to match(es) played on 3 April 2016. Source: Moldovan Football Federation (in Romanian)
Legend: Blue = home team win; Yellow = draw; Red = away team win.
