= 2020–21 Moldovan Women Top League =

Moldovan Women Top League
- Season: 2020–21
- Champions: Agarista Anenii Noi
- Champions League: Agarista Anenii Noi
- Top goalscorer: Alina Chirica (14 goals)

The 2020–21 Moldovan Women Top League was the 21st season of the highest women's football league in Moldova. The competition started on 27 September 2020 and ended on 6 June 2021.

== Teams ==
Location of the Top League 2020–21 teams.

Club	Location
Agarista	Anenii Noi
Belceanka	Bălți
Legia	Tiraspol
Maksimum	Cahul
Narta	Drăsliceni
Nistru	Cioburciu
Noroc	Nimoreni
Real Succes	Chișinău

== Format ==
The 8 teams will play a round-robin tournament whereby each team plays each other twice, once at home and once away. Thus, a total of 56 matches will be played, with 14 matches played by each team.

== League table ==
Pos	Team	Pld	W	D	L	GF	GA	GD	Pts	Qualification
1	Agarista Anenii Noi (C)	14	12	2	0	53	4	+49	38	Qualification to Champions League first round
2	Noroc Nimoreni	14	8	2	4	26	18	+8	26	
3	Maksimum Cahul	14	6	4	4	26	17	+9	22	
4	Nistru Cioburciu	14	6	2	6	27	15	+12	20 (Note: Goal difference: Nistru +12, Belceanka –1)	
5	Belceanka Bălți	14	6	2	6	19	20	−1	20	
6	Legia Tiraspol	14	4	5	5	13	20	−7	17	
7	Real Succes Chișinău	14	4	2	8	18	41	−23	14	
8	Narta Drăsliceni	14	0	1	13	3	50	−47	1	

Source: FMF, Soccerway
Rules for classification: 1) Points; 2) Head-to-head points; 3) Head-to-head goal difference; 4) Goal difference; 5) Goals scored; 6) Matches won; 7) Fairplay ranking.
(C) Champions

=== Results ===
Home \ Away	AGA	BEL	LEG	MAK	NAR	NIS	NOR	REA
Agarista Anenii Noi	—	4–0	0–0	1–0	11–0	1–0	2–0	12–0
Belceanka Bălți	1–3	—	2–1	1–1	1–0	1–0	0–2	5–2
Legia Tiraspol	0–2	0–3	—	3–2	1–0	1–1	3–0	1–1
Maksimum Cahul	1–1	2–2	2–0	—	5–0	0–4	3–1	3–0
Narta Drăsliceni	0–4	0–2	0–0	0–2	—	0–5	1–6	1–4
Nistru Cioburciu	1–4	1–0	5–0	0–3	4–0	—	1–1	4–0
Noroc Nimoreni	0–2	2–1	1–1	3–1	3–0	2–1	—	2–1
Real Succes Chișinău	1–6	2–0	1–2	1–1	2–1	2–0	1–3	—

Source: FMF (in Romanian)
Legend: Blue = home team win; Yellow = draw; Red = away team win.
