= 2017–18 Moldovan Women Top League =

Moldovan Women Top League
- Season: 2017–18
- Champions: Agarista-ȘS Anenii Noi
- Champions League: Agarista-ȘS Anenii Noi

The 2017–18 Moldovan Women Top League season in association football was the 18th since its establishment. The season began on 3 September 2017 and ended on 17 June 2018. Noroc Nimoreni were the defending champions.

== Teams ==
Location of the Top League 2017–18 teams.

Club	Location
Agarista-ȘS	Anenii Noi
Alga	Tiraspol
Belceanka	Bălți
ȘS Ciobruciu	Cioburciu
LTPS-2	Chișinău
Maksimum	Cahul
Narta-ȘS	Drăsliceni
Noroc	Nimoreni
ȘS 11-Real Succes	Chișinău

== Format ==
The schedule consists of two rounds, each team plays each other once home-and-away for a total of 16 matches per team.

== League table ==
Pos	Team	Pld	W	D	L	GF	GA	GD	Pts	Qualification
1	Agarista-ȘS Anenii Noi (C)	16	14	1	1	66	7	+59	43	Qualification to Champions League qualifying round
2	ȘS 11-Real Succes Chișinău	16	12	2	2	53	18	+35	38	
3	Alga Tiraspol	16	10	2	4	39	14	+25	32	
4	Belceanka Bălți	16	10	1	5	49	22	+27	31	
5	Noroc Nimoreni	16	7	5	4	29	17	+12	26	
6	Narta-ȘS Drăsliceni	16	4	3	9	26	51	−25	15	
7	Maksimum Cahul	16	3	3	10	18	39	−21	12	
8	ȘS Ciobruciu	16	3	0	13	10	66	−56	9	
9	LTPS-2 Chișinău	16	0	1	15	7	63	−56	1	

Source: FMF, Soccerway
Rules for classification: 1) Points; 2) Head-to-head points; 3) Head-to-head goal difference; 4) Goal difference; 5) Goals scored; 6) Matches won; 7) Fairplay ranking.
(C) Champions

=== Results ===
Home \ Away	AGA	ALG	BEL	CIO	LTP	MAK	NAR	NOR	REA
Agarista-ȘS Anenii Noi	—	3–1	4–0	12–0	5–0	4–0	2–1	1–0	2–0
Alga Tiraspol	1–0	—	2–0	4–0	7–0	1–0	7–0	1–1	1–2
Belceanka Bălți	1–4	4–0	—	8–0	3–0	4–1	2–2	2–1	4–2
ȘS Ciobruciu	1–10	0–3	1–7	—	1–0	2–1	0–3	1–2	1–5
LTPS-2 Chișinău	0–4	1–4	0–3	0–2	—	2–2	1–6	0–4	1–3
Maksimum Cahul	0–6	0–3	1–2	2–0	2–0	—	1–1	1–3	1–7
Narta-ȘS Drăsliceni	1–7	2–4	0–7	3–0	4–1	0–3	—	1–1	1–2
Noroc Nimoreni	0–1	0–0	2–1	2–1	5–0	1–1	5–1	—	2–2
ȘS 11-Real Succes Chișinău	1–1	1–0	2–1	4–0	8–1	3–2	8–0	3–0	—

Source: FMF (in Romanian)
Legend: Blue = home team win; Yellow = draw; Red = away team win.
