= 2019–20 Moldovan Women Top League =

Moldovan Women Top League
- Season: 2019–20
- Champions: Agarista-ȘS Anenii Noi
- Champions League: Agarista-ȘS Anenii Noi

The 2019–20 Moldovan Women Top League season in association football was the 20th since its establishment. The season began on 8 September 2019 and the last match were played on 8 December 2019. On 4 August 2020, the league was abandoned due to COVID-19 pandemic in Moldova. As a result, Agarista-ȘS Anenii Noi were declared champions.

== Teams ==
Location of the Top League 2019–20 teams.

Club	Location
Agarista-ȘS	Anenii Noi
PGU ȘS4-Alga	Tiraspol
Belceanka	Bălți
ȘS Ciobruciu-GTC	Cioburciu
Maksimum	Cahul
Narta-ȘS	Drăsliceni
Noroc	Nimoreni
ȘS 11-Real Succes	Chișinău

== Format ==
The schedule consists of two rounds, each team plays each other once home-and-away for a total of 12 matches per team.

== League table ==
Pos	Team	Pld	W	D	L	GF	GA	GD	Pts	Qualification
1	Agarista-ȘS Anenii Noi (C)	6	6	0	0	17	7	+10	18	Qualification to Champions League first qualifying round
2	Noroc Nimoreni	6	4	1	1	11	2	+9	13 (Note: Goal difference: Noroc +9, Real Succes +4)	
3	ȘS 11-Real Succes Chișinău	6	4	1	1	15	11	+4	13	
4	ȘS Ciobruciu-GTC	6	3	0	3	14	8	+6	9	
5	Belceanka Bălți	6	2	0	4	8	12	−4	6	
6	PGU ȘS4-Alga Tiraspol	6	1	0	5	9	14	−5	3	
7	Narta-ȘS Drăsliceni	6	0	0	6	1	21	−20	0	

Source: FMF, Soccerway
Rules for classification: 1) Points; 2) Head-to-head points; 3) Head-to-head goal difference; 4) Goal difference; 5) Goals scored; 6) Matches won; 7) Fairplay ranking.
1. Maksimum Cahul withdrew from the league after round 7 and their results were annulled.
(C) Champions

=== Results ===
Home \ Away	AGA	ALG	BEL	CIO	NAR	NOR	REA
Agarista-ȘS Anenii Noi	—	3–2	—	2–1	3–0	—	—
PGU ȘS4-Alga Tiraspol	—	—	—	—	4–0	0–2	2–3
Belceanka Bălți	2–4	4–0	—	0–4	—	—	—
ȘS Ciobruciu-GTC	—	2–1	—	—	5–0	0–1	—
Narta-ȘS Drăsliceni	—	—	0–1	—	—	0–5	1–3
Noroc Nimoreni	0–1	—	2–0	—	—	—	1–1
ȘS 11-Real Succes Chișinău	2–4	—	2–1	4–2	—	—	—

Source: FMF (in Romanian)
Legend: Blue = home team win; Yellow = draw; Red = away team win.
