= 2018–19 Moldovan Women Top League =

Moldovan Women Top League
- Season: 2018–19
- Champions: Agarista-ȘS Anenii Noi
- Champions League: Agarista-ȘS Anenii Noi

The 2018–19 Moldovan Women Top League season in association football was the 19th since its establishment. The season began on 2 September 2018 and ended on 26 May 2019. Agarista-ȘS Anenii Noi were the defending champions.

== Teams ==
Location of the Top League 2018–19 teams.

Club	Location
Agarista-ȘS	Anenii Noi
Alga	Tiraspol
Belceanka	Bălți
ȘS Ciobruciu-GTC	Cioburciu
LTPS-2	Chișinău
Maksimum	Cahul
Narta-ȘS	Drăsliceni
Noroc	Nimoreni
ȘS 11-Real Succes	Chișinău

== Format ==
The schedule consists of two rounds, each team plays each other once home-and-away for a total of 16 matches per team.

== League table ==
Pos	Team	Pld	W	D	L	GF	GA	GD	Pts	Qualification
1	Agarista-ȘS Anenii Noi (C)	16	13	1	2	76	14	+62	40	Qualification to Champions League qualifying round
2	Belceanka Bălți	16	12	1	3	48	20	+28	37	
3	ȘS 11-Real Succes Chișinău	16	10	1	5	33	20	+13	31	
4	Noroc Nimoreni	16	9	3	4	37	24	+13	30	
5	ȘS Ciobruciu-GTC	16	8	1	7	44	32	+12	25	
6	Maksimum Cahul	16	4	4	8	35	32	+3	16	
7	Alga Tiraspol	16	3	2	11	22	47	−25	11 (Note: Alga ahead of Narta on head-to-head goal difference: Alga–Narta 3–1, Narta–Alga 3–2)	
8	Narta-ȘS Drăsliceni	16	3	2	11	19	57	−38	11	
9	LTPS-2 Chișinău	16	2	1	13	17	85	−68	7	

Source: FMF, Soccerway
Rules for classification: 1) Points; 2) Head-to-head points; 3) Head-to-head goal difference; 4) Goal difference; 5) Goals scored; 6) Matches won; 7) Fairplay ranking.
(C) Champions

=== Results ===
Home \ Away	AGA	ALG	BEL	CIO	LTP	MAK	NAR	NOR	REA
Agarista-ȘS Anenii Noi	—	10–0	5–0	10–1	6–2	6–0	4–1	4–1	5–1
Alga Tiraspol	0–5	—	1–2	1–4	1–1	5–2	3–1	0–3	0–1
Belceanka Bălți	3–0	1–3	—	2–0	11–0	3–3	7–1	1–3	5–1
ȘS Ciobruciu-GTC	0–1	5–2	1–4	—	7–0	4–0	4–0	3–3	0–1
LTPS-2 Chișinău	1–10	3–2	0–1	0–8	—	4–3	1–3	1–4	0–11
Maksimum Cahul	0–2	0–0	1–2	4–0	9–0	—	7–0	4–0	1–2
Narta-ȘS Drăsliceni	1–6	3–2	0–1	0–3	5–4	1–1	—	1–4	0–2
Noroc Nimoreni	2–2	5–2	1–2	2–1	3–0	3–0	1–1	—	1–0
ȘS 11-Real Succes Chișinău	1–0	1–0	0–3	2–3	1–0	0–0	7–1	2–1	—

Source: FMF (in Romanian)
Legend: Blue = home team win; Yellow = draw; Red = away team win.
