= Maria Spînu =

Moldovan footballer

Personal information
- Date of birth: 24 March 1985 (age 41)
- Place of birth: Criuleni, Soviet Union (now Moldova)
- Position: Defender

Senior career*
Years	Team	Apps	(Gls)
- Narta
- Noroc
- ARF Criuleni
- ȘS Anenii Noi

International career^{‡}
2015	Moldova	10	(0)
- * Club domestic league appearances and goals ‡ National team caps and goals as of 28 November 2017

Maria Spînu (born 24 March 1985) is a Moldovan footballer who plays as a defender. She has been a member of the Moldova women's national team.

== See also ==
- List of Moldova women's international footballers
