= 2022–23 Moldovan Women Top League =

Liga Națională
- Season: 2022–23
- Champions: Agarista Anenii Noi
- Champions League: Agarista Anenii Noi

The 2022–23 Moldovan Women Top League was the 23rd season of the highest women's football league in Moldova. The competition started on 11 September 2022 and ended on 28 May 2023.

== Teams ==
Location of teams in 2022–23 Liga Națională

Club	Location
Agarista	Anenii Noi
Belceanka	Bălți
Legia	Tiraspol
Nistru	Cioburciu
Noroc	Nimoreni
Rainier	Drăsliceni
Real Succes	Chișinău

== Format ==
The six clubs will play each other three times for a total of 15 matches per team.

== League table ==
Pos	Team	Pld	W	D	L	GF	GA	GD	Pts	Qualification
1	Agarista Anenii Noi (C)	15	13	2	0	46	6	+40	41	Qualification to Champions League first round
2	Noroc Nimoreni	15	12	1	2	63	8	+55	37	
3	Rainier Drăsliceni	15	6	3	6	17	28	−11	21	withdrew (Note: Rainier Drăsliceni completed the season but withdrew from the league prior to the start of the next season.)
4	Belceanka Bălți	15	3	3	9	12	31	−19	12	
5	Real Succes Chișinău	15	3	1	11	13	49	−36	10	
6	Nistru Cioburciu	15	2	2	11	14	43	−29	8	withdrew (Note: Nistru Cioburciu completed the season but withdrew from the league prior to the start of the next season.)

Source: FMF, Soccerway
Rules for classification: 1) Points; 2) Play-off (only if deciding champion when two teams tied); 3) Head-to-head points; 4) Head-to-head goal difference; 5) Head-to-head away goals scored; 6) Head-to-head goals scored; 7) Matches won; 8) Goal difference; 9) Goals scored; 10) Least red cards; 11) Least yellow cards; 12) Drawing of lots
1. Legia Tiraspol withdrew from the league after round 8 and their results were annulled.
(C) Champions

== Results ==
=== Matches 1–10 ===
Teams play each other twice (once home, once away).

Home \ Away	AGA	BEL	NIS	NOR	RAI	REA
Agarista Anenii Noi	—	1–0	5–0	0–0	1–0	4–0
Belceanka Bălți	1–3	—	0–0	0–6	0–1	4–0
Nistru Cioburciu	2–5	0–4	—	2–3	0–4	2–3
Noroc Nimoreni	0–1	6–0	7–0	—	2–1	8–0
Rainier Drăsliceni	1–1	0–0	0–0	1–5	—	1–0
Real Succes Chișinău	1–6	2–2	1–0	1–2	4–0	—

Source: FMF (in Romanian)
Legend: Blue = home team win; Yellow = draw; Red = away team win.

=== Matches 11–15 ===
Teams play every other team once (either at home or away).

Home \ Away	AGA	BEL	NIS	NOR	RAI	REA
Agarista Anenii Noi	—	—	1–0	—	6–0	3–0
Belceanka Bălți	0–7	—	—	0–3	—	—
Nistru Cioburciu	—	1–0	—	—	2–6	5–1
Noroc Nimoreni	1–2	—	3–0	—	—	—
Rainier Drăsliceni	—	1–0	—	0–7	—	—
Real Succes Chișinău	—	0–1	—	0–10	0–1	—

Source: FMF (in Romanian)
Legend: Blue = home team win; Yellow = draw; Red = away team win.

== Top goalscorers ==
Rank	Player	Club	Goals
1	(Moldova) Iuliana Colnic	Noroc	26
2	(Moldova) Anisia Său	Noroc	10
3	(Moldova) Mihaela Gamarț	Agarista	9
4	(Moldova) Arina Bîrca	Agarista	7
5	(Moldova) Daniela Mardari	Noroc	6
