= Coșernița =

Coşerniţa may refer to several places in Moldova:

- Coşerniţa, a commune in Criuleni district
- Coşerniţa, a commune in Floreşti district
