= Boscana =

Boscana is a surname. Notable people with the surname include:

- Gerónimo Boscana, early nineteenth-century Franciscan missionary in Spanish and Mexican California
- Lucy Boscana (1915–2001), actress and a pioneer in Puerto Rico's television industry

== See also ==
- Boşcana, commune in Criuleni district, Moldova
