= 2023–24 Moldovan Women Top League =

Liga Națională
- Season: 2023–24
- Champions: Agarista Anenii Noi
- Champions League: Agarista Anenii Noi

The 2023–24 Moldovan Women Top League was the 24th season of the highest women's football league in Moldova. The competition started on 10 September 2023 and ended on 12 June 2024.

== Teams ==
Location of teams in 2023–24 Liga Națională

Club	Location
Agarista	Anenii Noi
Belceanka	Bălți
Chișinău	Chișinău
Noroc	Nimoreni
Real Succes Pudra	Chișinău

== Format ==
Five clubs will play each other four times for a total of 16 matches per team.

== League table ==
Pos	Team	Pld	W	D	L	GF	GA	GD	Pts	Qualification
1	Agarista Anenii Noi (C)	16	16	0	0	100	5	+95	48	Qualification to Champions League first round
2	Chișinău	16	8	2	6	55	17	+38	26	withdrew (Note: Chișinău completed the season but withdrew from the league prior to the start of the next season.)
3	Real Succes Pudra	16	7	1	8	24	42	−18	22	
4	Belceanka Bălți	16	6	3	7	37	27	+10	21	withdrew (Note: Belceanka completed the season but withdrew from the league prior to the start of the next season.)
5	Noroc Nimoreni	16	0	0	16	6	131	−125	0	withdrew (Note: Noroc completed the season but withdrew from the league prior to the start of the next season.)

Source: FMF, Soccerway
Rules for classification: 1) Points; 2) Play-off (only if deciding champion when two teams tied); 3) Head-to-head points; 4) Head-to-head goal difference; 5) Head-to-head away goals scored; 6) Head-to-head goals scored; 7) Matches won; 8) Goal difference; 9) Goals scored; 10) Least red cards; 11) Least yellow cards; 12) Drawing of lots
(C) Champions

=== Results ===
Home \ Away	AGA	BEL	CHI	NOR	REA	AGA	BEL	CHI	NOR	REA
Agarista Anenii Noi	—	4–1	1–0	3–0 (Note: Agarista received a 3–0 technical win in a home game against Noroc. The referee decided not to start the match since Noroc had only eight players at the start.)	5–0	—	4–2	3–0	16–1	13–0
Belceanka Bălți	0–5	—	1–1	8–0	0–1	0–5	—	2–1	14–0	2–0
Chișinău	1–3	2–0	—	14–0	4–0	0–3	1–1	—	8–0	2–0
Noroc Nimoreni	0–14	1–4	1–10	—	0–2	0–11	0–2	0–8	—	1–4
Real Succes Pudra	0–4	2–0	2–1	5–2	—	0–6	0–0	0–2	8–0	—

Source: FMF (in Romanian)
Legend: Blue = home team win; Yellow = draw; Red = away team win.
