= 2013–14 Moldovan Women Top League =

Moldovan Women Top League
- Season: 2013–14

The 2013–14 Moldovan Women Top League season in association football is the 14th since its establishment. A total of 7 teams contested the league. One team though was excluded after two matchdays. No matches were kept in the standings. Another one withdrew voluntarily during the season. Their results were kept and subsequent matches awarded as 3–0 losses.

The season began on 8 September 2013 and ended on 25 May 2014. Goliador Chişinău were the defending champions.

== Teams ==
Club	Location
Goliador Chişinău	Chişinău
FC Narta ŞS Drăsliceni	Ratuş
CS Noroc Nimoreni	Nimoreni
FC Olimpia Bălți	Bălți
PGU ȘS4-FC Alga Tiraspol	Tiraspol
LTPS nr.2-Academia Nimoreni	Nimoreni
CS Moldova Mîndreşti	Mîndreşti

== Format ==
Team play each other three times for a total of 15 matches each.

== League table ==
CS Moldova Mîndreşti voluntarily withdrew after eight matches. Results were kept in the table and following matches were awarded.

Pos	Team	Pld	W	D	L	GF	GA	GD	Pts	Qualification
1	Goliador Chişinău (C)	15	12	1	2	54	10	+44	37	2014–15 UEFA Champions League qualifying round
2	CS Noroc Nimoreni	15	12	0	3	67	12	+55	36	
3	PGU ȘS4-FC Alga Tiraspol	15	9	3	3	36	13	+23	30	
4	FC Narta ŞS Drăsliceni	15	5	3	7	27	26	+1	18	
5	LTPS nr.2-Academia Nimoreni	15	2	1	12	8	70	−62	7	
6	CS Moldova Mîndreşti	15	1	0	14	3	61	−58	3	
-	FC Olimpia Bălți	0	0	0	0	0	0	0	0	

(C) Champions

Source: Moldovan Football Federation
