= 2021–22 Moldovan Women Top League =

Moldovan Women Top League
- Season: 2021–22
- Champions: Maksimum Cahul
- Champions League: Agarista Anenii Noi

The 2021–22 Moldovan Women Top League was the 22nd season of the highest women's football league in Moldova. The competition started on 12 September 2021 and ended on 29 May 2022.

== Teams ==
Location of the Top League 2021–22 teams.

Club	Location
Agarista	Anenii Noi
Belceanka	Bălți
Legia	Tiraspol
Maksimum	Cahul
Noroc	Nimoreni
Real Succes	Chișinău

== Teams ==
On 20 October 2021 due to withdrawal of Nistru Cioburciu and Narta Drăsliceni, the executive committee changed the format and clubs will play each other three times instead of twice.
Nistru withdrew without playing a single game, Narta played two games and lost them both with their results annulled.

== League table ==
Pos	Team	Pld	W	D	L	GF	GA	GD	Pts	Qualification
1	Maksimum Cahul (Note: Maksimum Cahul failed to apply for the UEFA license and their Champions League berth was given to the next-placed team of the league) (C)	15	10	5	0	35	8	+27	35	withdrew (Note: Maksimum Cahul completed the season but withdrew from the league prior to the start of the next season.)
2	Agarista Anenii Noi	15	10	3	2	39	9	+30	33	Qualification to Champions League first round
3	Real Succes Chișinău	15	3	7	5	17	36	−19	16	
4	Legia Tiraspol	15	3	6	6	16	22	−6	15 (Note: Legia ahead of Noroc on head-to-head points: Legia : 7p, Noroc : 1p.)	
5	Noroc Nimoreni	15	3	6	6	16	24	−8	15	
6	Belceanka Bălți	15	1	3	11	5	29	−24	6	

Source: FMF, Soccerway
Rules for classification: 1) Points; 2) Play-off (only if deciding champion when two teams tied); 3) Head-to-head points; 4) Head-to-head goal difference; 5) Head-to-head away goals scored; 6) Head-to-head goals scored; 7) Matches won; 8) Goal difference; 9) Goals scored; 10) Least red cards; 11) Least yellow cards.
(C) Champions

== Results ==
=== Matches 1–10 ===
Teams play each other twice (once home, once away).

Home \ Away	AGA	BEL	LEG	MAK	NOR	REA
Agarista Anenii Noi	—	5–0	2–1	0–1	1–1	4–0
Belceanka Bălți	0–4	—	0–0	0–1	1–1	0–1
Legia Tiraspol	0–2	3–0 (Note: Belceanka was awarded a technical loss against Legia due to their failure to appear at their round 13 match)	—	1–1	2–0	1–1
Maksimum Cahul	0–0	1–0	1–0	—	4–1	7–0
Noroc Nimoreni	0–6	4–0	0–0	0–1	—	3–2
Real Succes Chișinău	1–6	2–1	1–1	1–1	1–1	—

Source: FMF (in Romanian)
Legend: Blue = home team win; Yellow = draw; Red = away team win.

=== Matches 11–15 ===
Teams play every other team once (either at home or away).

Home \ Away	AGA	BEL	LEG	MAK	NOR	REA
Agarista Anenii Noi	—	2–1	—	—	2–0	—
Belceanka Bălți	—	—	1–0	1–2	—	—
Legia Tiraspol	0–4	—	—	1–5	4–2	—
Maksimum Cahul	1–1	—	—	—	0–0	9–2
Noroc Nimoreni	—	3–0	—	—	—	0–0
Real Succes Chișinău	3–0 (Note: Match awarded 3–0 to Real Succes, due to Agarista making six substitutions instead of the maximum five allowed. Agarista had originally won 9–0.)	0–0	2–2	—	—	—

Source: FMF (in Romanian)
Legend: Blue = home team win; Yellow = draw; Red = away team win.

== Top goalscorers ==
Rank	Player	Club	Goals
1	(Moldova) Iuliana Colnic	Maksimum	22
2	(Moldova) Anisia Său	Noroc & Agarista	9
3	(Moldova) Doina Ciobanu	Maksimum	7
