= Claudia Sersun =

Moldovan politician and activist

- Born: Slobozia-Duşca
- Education: Colegiul de Muzica "Stefa Neaga"
- Political party: Party Alliance Our Moldova
- Awards: Order of the Star of Romania

Claudia Sersun (born Slobozia-Duşca) is a politician and activist from Moldova. She served as the head of the Department of Culture of the Criuleni District, Ialoveni District, and Chişinău County. She has been a founder member of the Women's political club since December 16, 1999.

== Awards ==
- Claudia Sersun was awarded, by a presidential decree, with Romania's highest state decoration – the Order of the Star of Romania.
