= 2014–15 Moldovan Women Top League =

Moldovan Women Top League
- Season: 2014–15

The 2014–15 Moldovan Women Top League season in association football is the 15th since its establishment. A total of 7 teams contested the league.

The season began on 7 September 2014 and ended on 25 May 2015. Goliador Chişinău were the defending champions.

== Teams ==
Club	Location
Real Succes-ŞS 11	Chişinău
CS Noroc Nimoreni	Nimoreni
PGU ȘS4-FC Alga Tiraspol	Tiraspol
FC Narta ŞS Drăsliceni	Ratuş
LTPS nr.2-Academia Nimoreni	Nimoreni
ȘS Bălți	Bălți
FC Cahul-2005	Cahul

== Format ==
Team play each other three times for a total of 18 matches each.

== League table ==
Pos	Team	Pld	W	D	L	GF	GA	GD	Pts	Qualification
1	CS Noroc Nimoreni	18	15	0	3	97	17	+80	45	2015–16 UEFA Champions League qualifying round
2	PGU ȘS4-FC Alga Tiraspol	18	13	2	3	77	16	+61	41	
3	Real Succes-ŞS 11	18	12	2	4	70	18	+52	38	
4	LTPS nr.2-Academia Nimoreni	18	10	3	5	52	15	+37	33	
5	FC Narta ŞS Drăsliceni	18	5	1	12	29	51	−22	16	
6	ȘS Bălți	18	3	0	15	12	87	−75	9	
7	FC Cahul-2005	18	1	0	17	5	138	−133	3	

Source: Moldovan Football Federation
