= Bălțata =

Bălțata may refer to several villages in Romania:

- Bălțata, a village in Cuca Commune, Argeș County
- Bălțata, a village in Sărata Commune, Bacău County

and a commune in Moldova:

- Bălțata, Criuleni, a commune in Criuleni district
