= Mashkautsan =

Mashkautsan (sometimes Mashkautzan, Mashcautsan, etc.; Romanian: Mașcăuțan) is a surname of Bessarabian Jews. It is a toponymic surname literally meaning "one from Mașcăuți". Notable people with the surname include:

- Semyon Mashkautsan (born 1990), Russian official, illegal head of the Russia-occupied Kherson Oblast
- Shabsa Mashkautsan (1924–2022), Soviet soldier, Hero of the Soviet Union
