= Bălășești =

Bălăşeşti may refer to:

- Bălășești, Galați, a commune in Galați County, Romania
- Bălăşeşti, Sîngerei, a commune in Sîngerei district, Moldova
- Bălăşeşti, a village in Răculeşti Commune, Criuleni district, Moldova
