= Alina Stețenco =

Moldovan footballer (born 1988)

Personal information
- Date of birth: 18 October 1988 (age 38)
- Place of birth: Moldova

Senior career*
Years	Team	Apps	(Gls)
- Noroc

Managerial career
- –2014: Noroc
- 2015–2018: Moldova
- 2020–2022: Kryvbas
- * Club domestic league appearances and goals

Alina Stețenco (born 18 October 1988) is a Moldovan football manager and former footballer who managed the Moldova women's national football team.

Stețenco started her managerial career with Moldovan side Noroc, helping the club win the league. She later managed Ukrainian side Kryvbas, helping the club achieve third place. She mainly used the 4-2-3-1 formation while managing the Moldova women's national football team.

Stețenco received media attention for reporting a match-fixing attempt and was awarded Moldovan Football Person of the Year as a result.
