= Corjova =

Corjova may refer to several places in Moldova:

- Corjova, Criuleni, a commune in Criuleni district
- Corjova, Dubăsari, a commune in Dubăsari district
