= Bălăbănești =

Bălăbăneşti may refer to:

- Bălăbăneşti, a commune in Galați County, Romania
- Bălăbăneşti, a commune in Criuleni district, Moldova
