= Ișnovăț =

- Village
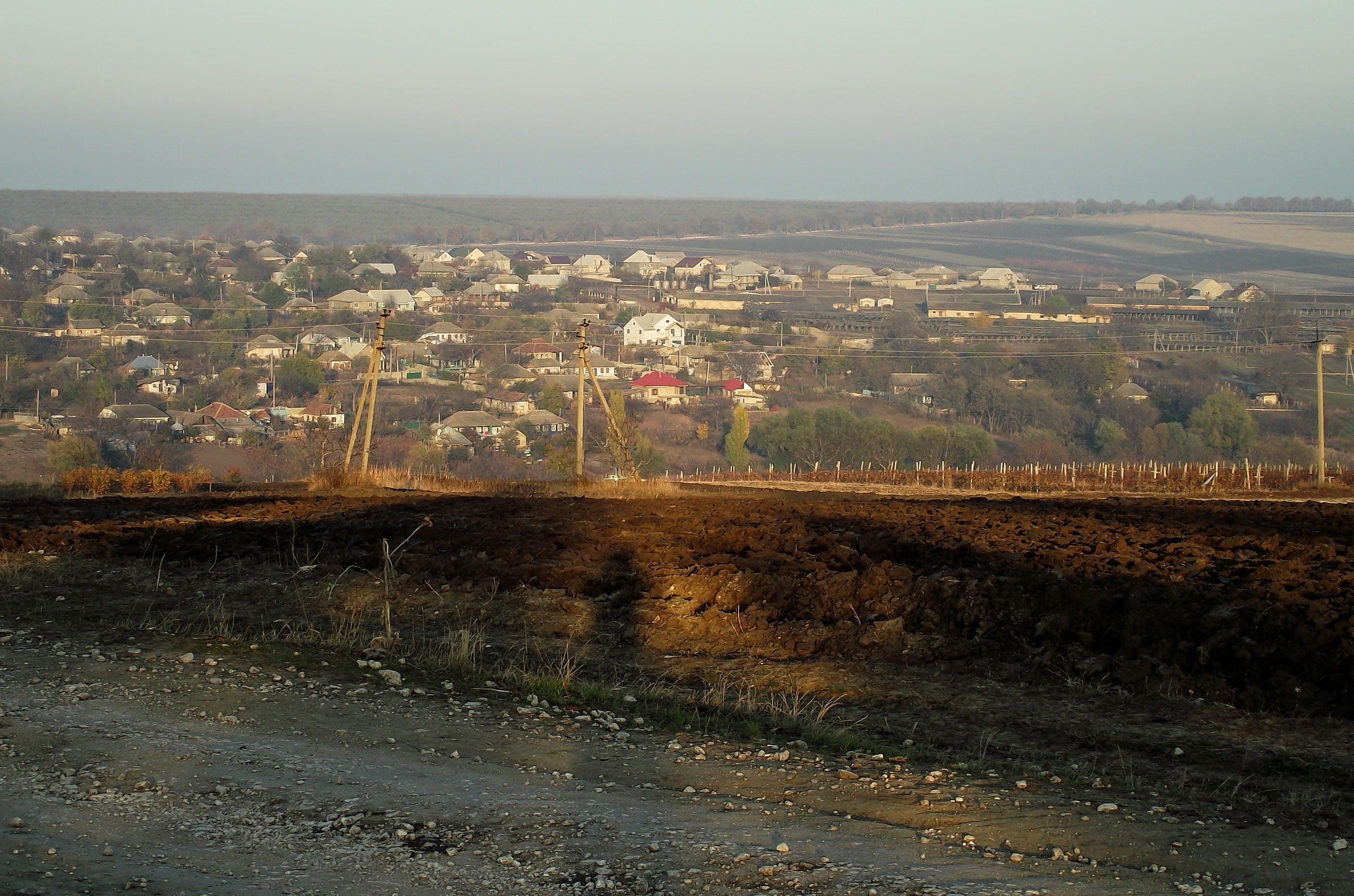

- Location within Moldova
- Coordinates: 47.2322222222°N 28.8655555556°E
- Country: Moldova
- District: Criuleni

Government
  - Mayor: Duca Andrei (PDM)

Population (2014 census)
  - Total: 1,508
- Time zone: UTC+2 (EET)
  - Summer (DST): UTC+3 (EEST)

Ișnovăț is a village in Criuleni District, Moldova. The 2014 census recorded a population of 1,508.
