= Moldovan Women's League =

Association football league in Moldova

- Founded: 1996
- Country: Moldova
- Confederation: UEFA
- Divisions: 1
- Number of clubs: 4
- Level on pyramid: 1
- Domestic cup: Moldovan Women's Cup
- International cup: UEFA Champions League
- Current champions: Agarista-ȘS Anenii Noi (2024–25)
- Most championships: FC Codru Chișinău/ FC Codru Anenii Noi; Agarista-ȘS Anenii Noi (7 titles)
- Top scorer: Claudia Chiper (61 goals)
- Website: Official site (in Romanian)
- Current: 2026–27 Moldovan Women's League

The Moldovan Women's League (Romanian: Liga Națională) is the top level women's football league of Moldova. It is organized by the Moldovan Football Federation.

The winning team of the league qualifies for a spot in the UEFA Women's Champions League.

== Clubs ==
As of 6 May 2024.

Location of teams in 2023–24 Moldovan Women's Football Championship

2023–24 clubs
Club	Location
Agarista	Anenii Noi
Belceanka	Bălți
Chișinău	Chișinău
Noroc	Nimoreni
Real Succes Pudra	Chișinău

== Format ==
The teams play each other twice per season. Ranking is determined by points. Three points per win, one point per draw, if teams are tied in points, the tiebreakers are in descending order:

- points earned in direct matches
- goal difference in direct matches
- goal difference accumulated in all matches
- number of goals scored during all matches
- number of victories in all matches
- the number of yellow and red cards received in all matches

== List of champions ==
The list of champions:

- 1996–97: Codru Chișinău
- 1997–98: Codru Chișinău
- 1998–99: Constructorul Chișinău
- 1999–00: Constructorul Chișinău
- 2000–01: Codru Chișinău
- 2001–02: FC Codru Anenii Noi
- 2002–03: FC Codru Anenii Noi
- 2003–04: FC Codru Anenii Noi
- 2004–05: FC Codru Anenii Noi
- 2005–06: Narta Chișinău
- 2006–07: Narta Chișinău
- 2007–08: Narta Chișinău
- 2008–09: Narta Chișinău
- 2009–10: FC Roma Calfa
- 2010–11: Goliador Chişinău
- 2011–12: Noroc Nimoreni
- 2012–13: Goliador Chişinău
- 2013–14: Real Succes-ȘS 11 Chișinău
- 2014–15: Noroc Nimoreni
- 2015–16: ARF Criuleni
- 2016–17: Noroc Nimoreni
- 2017–18: Agarista-ȘS Anenii Noi
- 2018–19: Agarista-ȘS Anenii Noi
- 2019–20: Agarista-ȘS Anenii Noi
- 2020–21: Agarista-ȘS Anenii Noi
- 2021–22: FC Maksimum Cahul
- 2022–23: Agarista-ȘS Anenii Noi
- 2023–24: Agarista-ȘS Anenii Noi
- 2024–25: Agarista-ȘS Anenii Noi
- 2025–26: Zimbru Chișinău

== Performance by club ==
Club	Winners	Winning Years
FC Codru Anenii Noi (Codru Chişinău)	7	1996–97, 1997–98, 2000–01, 2001–02, 2002–03, 2003–04, 2004–05
Agarista-ȘS Anenii Noi	7	2017–18, 2018–19, 2019–20, 2020–21, 2022–23, 2023–24, 2024–25
Narta Chișinău	4	2005–06, 2006–07, 2007–08, 2008–09
Real Succes-ȘS 11 Chișinău (Goliador Chişinău)	3	2010–11, 2012–13, 2013–14
Noroc Nimoreni	3	2011–12, 2014–15, 2016–17
Constructorul Chișinău	2	1998–99, 1999–00
Roma Calfa	1	2009–10
ARF Criuleni	1	2015–16
FC Maksimum Cahul	1	2021–22
Zimbru Chișinău	1	2025–26

== Top goalscorers ==
Season	Name	Club	Goals
2013-14	(Moldova) Claudia Chiper	Noroc	34
2020-21	(Moldova) Alina Chirica	Agarista	14
2021-22	(Moldova) Iuliana Colnic	Maksimum Cahul	22
2022–23	(Moldova) Iuliana Colnic	Noroc	26
2023–24	(Ukraine) Yelyzaveta Indycha	Agarista	24
2024–25	(Moldova) Polina Mazur	Agarista	24
2025–26	(Moldova) Polina Mazur	Zimbru Chișinău	22

Most goals by a player in a single season

- 34 goals.
  - Claudia Chiper (2013-14).
