= Shabsa Mashkautsan =

Soviet army lieutenant (1924–2022)

Shabsa Mendelevich Mashkautsan (Note: The surname Mașcauțan literally means "someone from Mașcăuți") (Romanian: Șabsa Mașcauțan; Russian: Машкауцан, Шабса Менделевич; January 6, 1924 – September 19, 2022) was a Soviet soldier and a Hero of the Soviet Union.

== Biography ==
Shabsa (Shapsa) Mashkautsan was born in Orhei, Bessarabia (then in Romania, now in Moldova) to Bessarabian Jewish parents, house painter Mendel and Rakhel. In his Russian documents his name was written as Shabsa or (earlier) Shapsa. In June 1940, Bessarabia was occupied and annexed by the Soviet Union. When Nazi Germany attacked the Soviet Union, Shabsa was evacuated to Shpakovsky District, Ordzhonikidze Krai (now Stavropol Krai). He volunteered to a rifle battalion in reserve, which attached to the 50th Reserve Infantry Regiment. In February 1942, he was drafted to the 530th Tank-Destroyer Artillery Regiment, 28th Army, 1st Ukrainian Front, where he served to the end of the war.

Mashkautsan was awarded Hero of the Soviet Union on June 27, 1945. His award list says:

"On April 29, 1945, near Mönningsee (near Kummersdorf) in a Berlin suburb, a young sergeant with the 530th Tank Destroyer Regiment carried on a battle with 200 Germans and two self-propelled guns... Twice he changed positions under enemy fire, set fire to one self-propelled gun, then the second, which had come right up to his position. After putting the guns out of commission, Sergeant Mashkautsan began firing at the infantry. As a result he killed 50 soldiers and officers by gunfire and 4 by pistol fire.

The enemy hurled its tanks and armored carriers with infantry against this section. Again he opened fire; with two shells Mashkautsan hit a tank and right after that one of the armored carriers.

The second armored carrier rolled toward the gun, and when it was 2 meters from it, Mashkautsan hurled a grenade and then, in spite of a contusion, again opened fire on the enemy. More than 200 dead Germans were left in the field."

After the war he continued army service and discharged to reserve in 1953 in the rank of guards lieutenant. In 1961, he graduated from a technical school and worked as senior foreman at a tractor plant, later as director of the plant's technical school. He lived in Kishinev. In June 1989, he emigrated to the United States, at first to New Jersey, later he moved to New Haven, Connecticut.

Mashkautsan died on September 19, 2022, at the age of 98.

== Decorations ==
- Golden Star medal of the Hero of the Soviet Union (27 June 1945)
- Order of Lenin (June 27, 1945)
- Order of the Patriotic War, 1st class (11 March 1985)
- Medal "For Courage" (twice, June 10, 1944 and September 14, 1944)
- Medal "For the Defence of the Caucasus"
- Medal "For the Capture of Berlin"
- Medal "For the Capture of Königsberg"
