= Dolinnoe =

- Commune
- Location in Moldova
- Coordinates: 47°1′N 29°0′E
- Country: Moldova
- District: Criuleni District

Population (2014)
  - Total: 1,154

Dolinnoe is a commune in Criuleni District, Moldova. It is composed of three villages: Dolinnoe, Valea Coloniței and Valea Satului.
