= Măgdăcești =

Village in Moldova

- Village
- Location within Moldova
- Coordinates: 47.1338888889°N 28.8255555556°E
- Country: Moldova
- District: Criuleni District

Government
  - Mayor: Lupascu Vasile (PLDM)
- Elevation: 110 m (360 ft)

Population (2014 census)
  - Total: 5,212
- Time zone: UTC+2 (EET)
  - Summer (DST): UTC+3 (EEST)

Măgdăcești is a village in Criuleni District, Moldova.
