= Slobozia-Dușca =

- Village
- Location in Moldova
- Coordinates: 47°10′N 29°07′E
- Country: Moldova
- District: Criuleni District

Population (2014 census)
  - Total: 2,866
- Time zone: UTC+2 (EET)
  - Summer (DST): UTC+3 (EEST)

Slobozia-Dușca is a village in Criuleni District, Moldova. The river Dniester flows near the village.

== Notable people ==
- Ion Luchianov
- Claudia Sersun
