= Cruglic =

- Village
- Location within Moldova
- Coordinates: 47.2208333333°N 29.0275°E
- Country: Moldova
- District: Criuleni

Government
  - Mayor: Gheorghi Druța (PDM)

Population (2014 census)
  - Total: 2,385
- Time zone: UTC+2 (EET)
  - Summer (DST): UTC+3 (EEST)

Cruglic is a village in Criuleni District, Moldova.
