= Miclești, Criuleni =

Miclești
- Commune
- Location within Moldova
- Coordinates: 47.24°N 28.8052777778°E
- Country: Moldova
- District: Criuleni District

Government
  - Mayor: Iurie Buga (PLDM)
- Elevation: 197 m (646 ft)

Population (2014)
  - Total: 1,864
- Time zone: UTC+2 (EET)
  - Summer (DST): UTC+3 (EEST)
- Website: https://primariamiclesti.md/

Miclești is a commune in Criuleni District, Moldova. It is composed of two villages, Miclești and Stețcani.
