= Hîrtopul Mare =

- Commune
- Location within Moldova
- Country: Moldova
- District: Criuleni District

Government
  - Mayor: Dumitru Roșca (Partidul Liberal)

Population (2014)
  - Total: 4,091
- Time zone: UTC+2 (EET)
  - Summer (DST): UTC+3 (EEST)
- Website: http://www.hirtopul-mare.md

Hîrtopul Mare is a commune in Criuleni District, Moldova. It is composed of two villages, Hîrtopul Mare and Hîrtopul Mic.
