= Pașcani, Criuleni =

Pașcani
- Commune
- Location in Moldova
- Coordinates: 47°10′N 28°49′E
- Country: Moldova
- District: Criuleni District
- Elevation: 348 ft (106 m)

Population (2014)
  - Total: 2,527
- Time zone: UTC+2 (EET)
  - Summer (DST): UTC+3 (EEST)
- Postal code: MD-4834
- Area code: +373 248

Pașcani is a commune in Criuleni District, Moldova. It is composed of two villages, Pașcani and Porumbeni.

== Notable people ==
- Ion Mistreț
