= Rîșcova =

- Village
- Location within Moldova
- Coordinates: 47.2519444444°N 28.8486111111°E
- Country: Moldova
- District: Criuleni

Government
  - Mayor: Dumitru Sîrbu (PDM)

Population (2014 census)
  - Total: 1,171
- Time zone: UTC+2 (EET)
  - Summer (DST): UTC+3 (EEST)

Rîșcova is a village in Criuleni District, Moldova.
