= Onițcani =

- Village
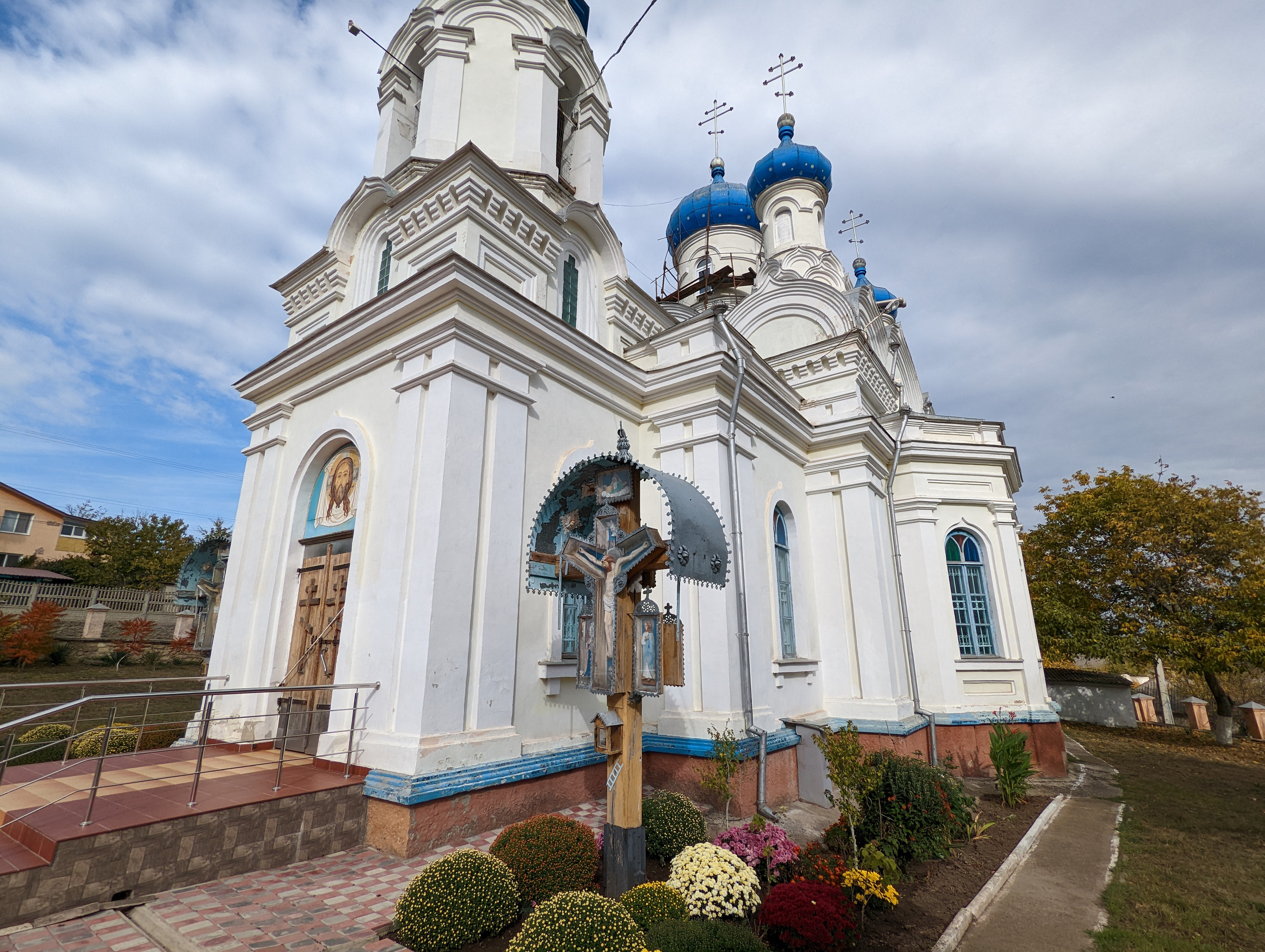

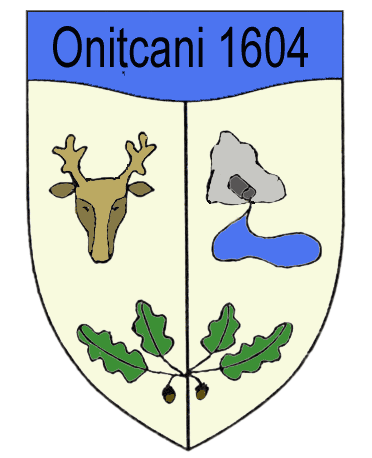
- Coat of arms

- Location in Moldova
- Coordinates: 47°09′N 29°04′E
- Country: Moldova
- District: Criuleni District
- Founded: 1604
- Elevation: 115 ft (35 m)

Population (2014 census)
  - Total: 2,192
- Time zone: UTC+2 (EET)
  - Summer (DST): UTC+3 (EEST)
- Postal code: MD-4833
- Area code: +373 248 79

Onițcani is a village in Criuleni District, Moldova.

Onițcani village is located in a picturesque location on the banks of the Dniester. The first mention in the annals found in 1604. The village is famous for its large number of springs. Some of them are very specific in their chemical composition. They are also the national heritage, as their age is several centuries, so they are under state protection. The village has a church, unique in its architecture, the only similar analogue of which can be seen only in Romania.

== Population ==
According to the 2004 Moldovan Census, the population of the Onițcani village is 2089 people (1011 men, 1078 women).

The ethnic composition of the village:

Nationality	Population	Percentage
Moldovans	2004	95.93
Russians	26	1.24
Ukrainians	19	0.91
Gypsies	14	0.67
Romanians	10	0.48
Bulgarians	3	0.14
Gagauz	1	0.05
Other	12	0.57
Total	2089	100%

== Gallery ==
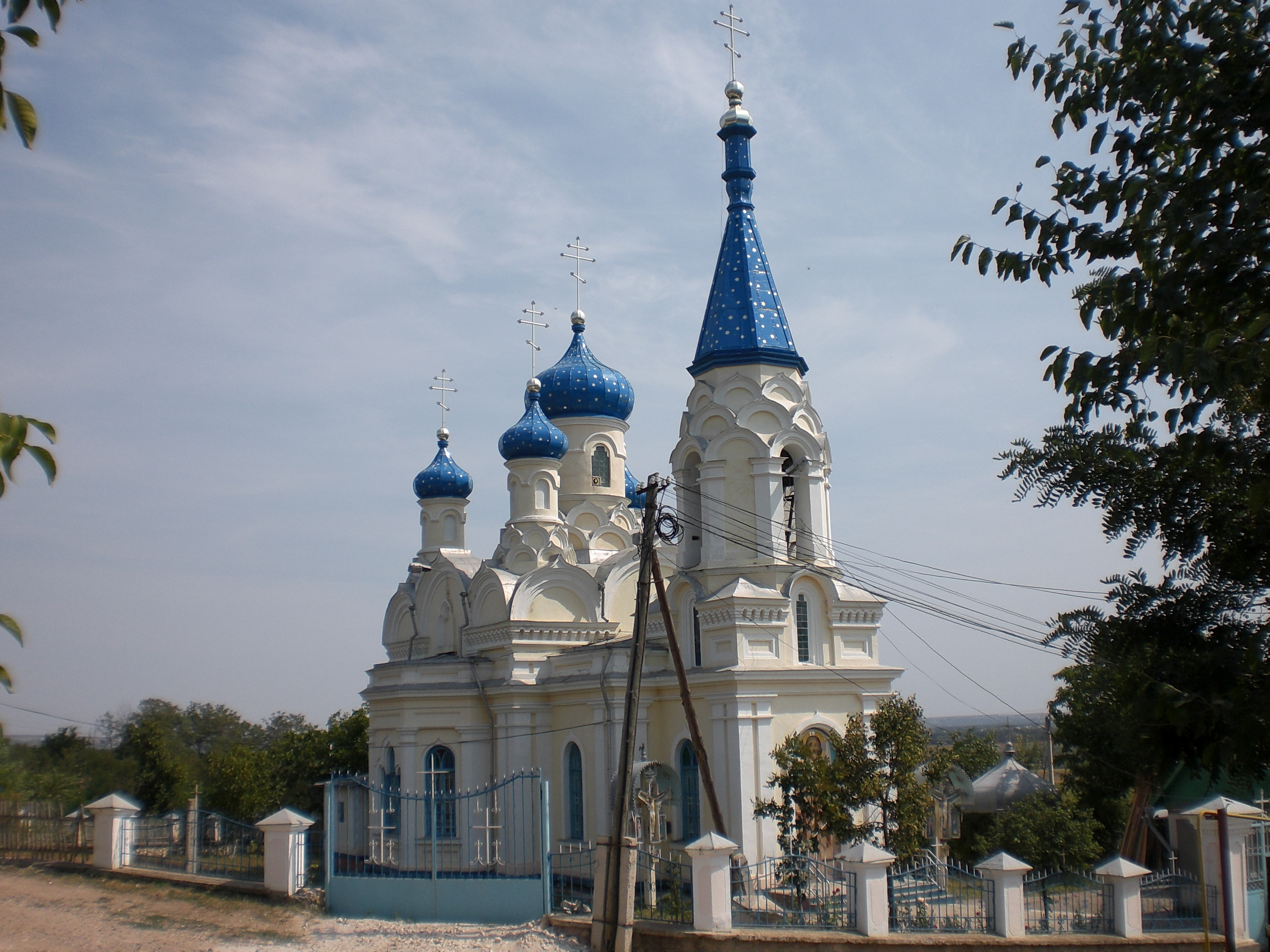
Church

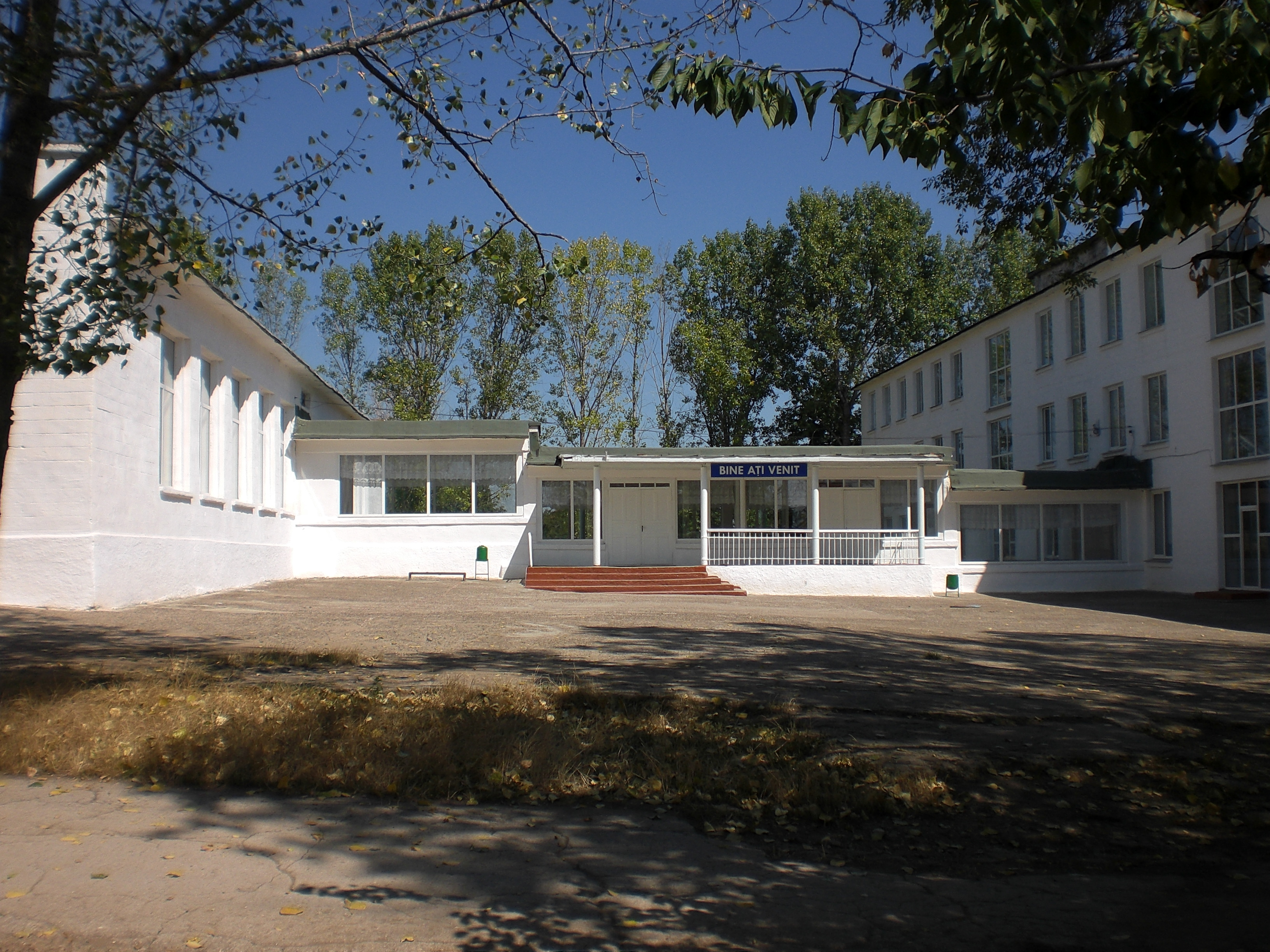
School

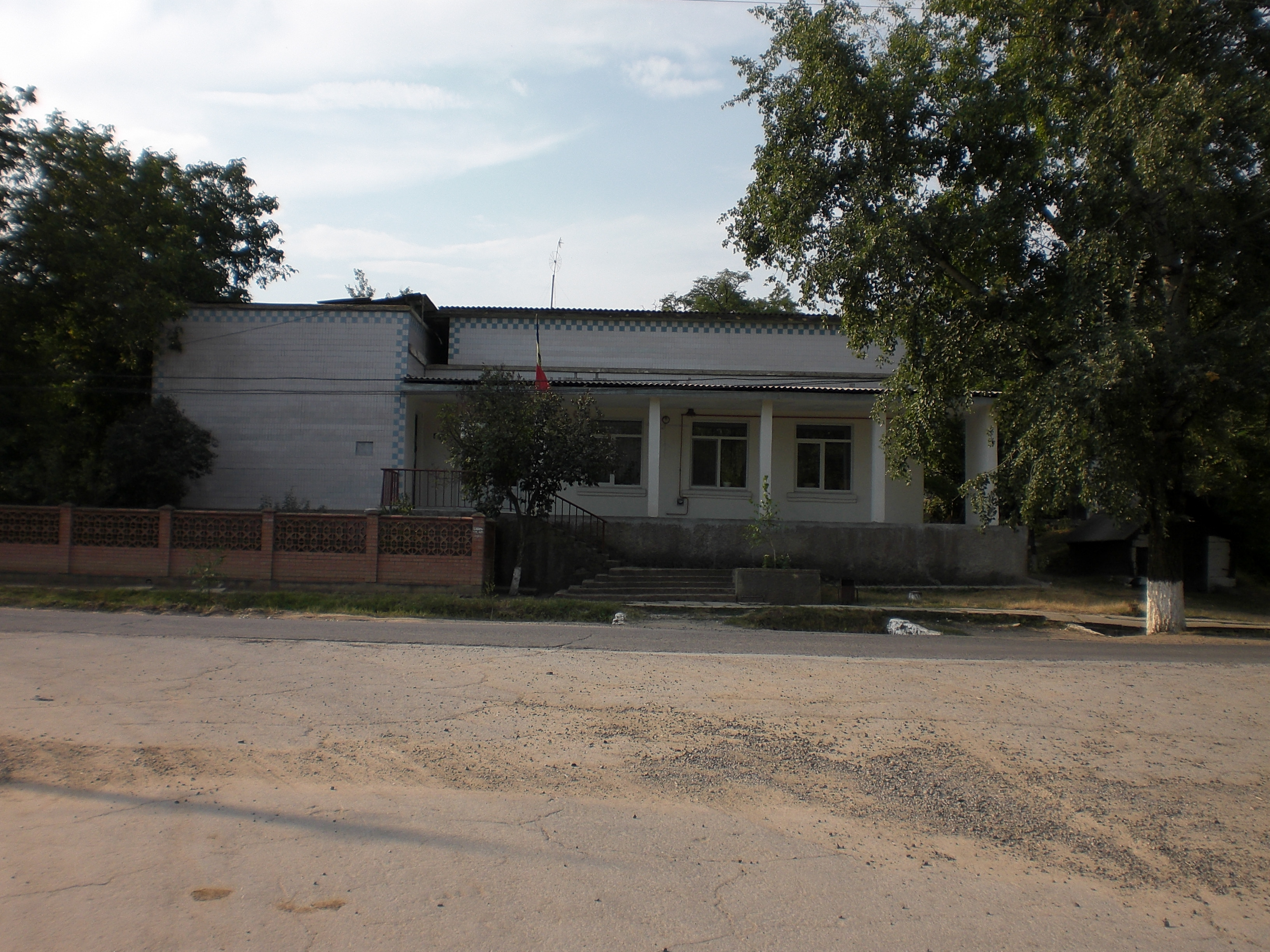
City Hall
