= Jevreni =

- Village
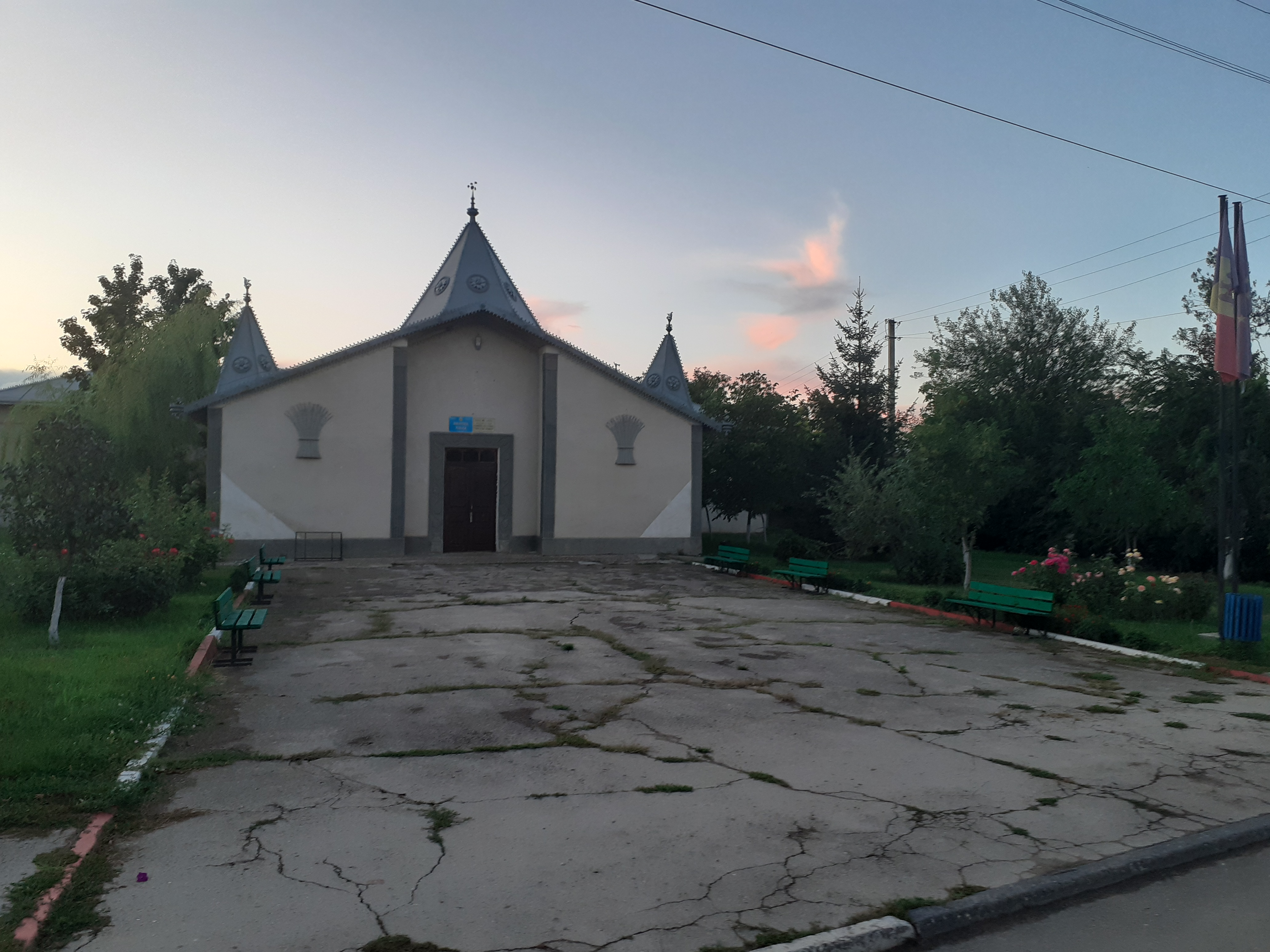
- Cultural center in Jevreni

- Location within Moldova
- Coordinates: 47°15′29″N 29°03′50″E
- Country: Moldova

Government
  - Mayor: Igor Rotari (PDM)
- Elevation: 35 m (115 ft)

Population (2014 census)
  - Total: 1,419
- Time zone: UTC+2 (EET)
  - Summer (DST): UTC+3 (EEST)
- Postal code: MD-4828

Jevreni is a village in Criuleni District, Moldova.
