= Hrușova =

- Commune
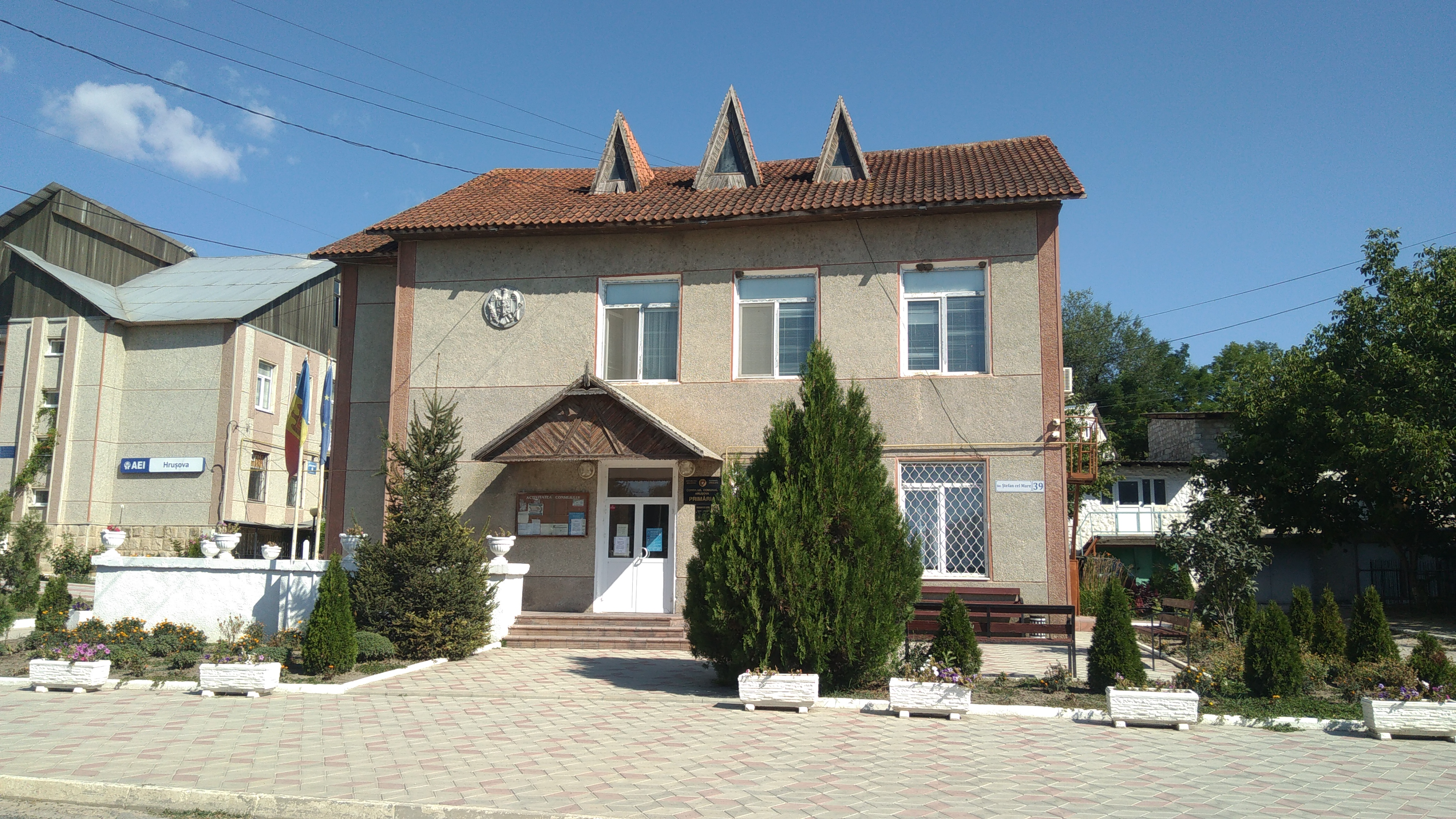
- Hrușova Commune City Hall, Criuleni District

- Location within Moldova
- Coordinates: 47.1363888889°N 28.9519444444°E
- Country: Moldova
- District: Criuleni District

Population (2014)
  - Total: 2,494
- Time zone: UTC+2 (EET)
  - Summer (DST): UTC+3 (EEST)

Hrușova is a commune in Criuleni District, Moldova. It is composed of three villages: Chetroasa, Ciopleni and Hrușova.
