= Gurie Grosu =

Moldovan bishop

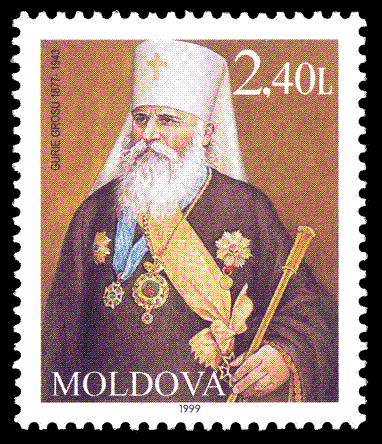
- Born: Gheorghe Grosu; 1 January 1877; Nimoreni, Bessarabia Governorate
- Died: 14 November 1943 (aged 66); Bucharest, Kingdom of Romania
- Resting place: Cernica Monastery
- Political party: National Moldavian Party

Gurie Grosu (Romanian pronunciation: [ˈɡuri.e ˈɡrosu]; 1 January 1877 – 14 November 1943) was a Bessarabian priest and the first holder of the Basarabian Metropolitan Church after 100 years of Russian occupation. His Christian name was Gheorghe, and he took the name of Gurie when became a monk. Gurie was an extremely devout man and one of the promoters of Romanianism in Bessarabia.

When King Carol II paid a visit to Bessarabia in 1930, Metropolitan Gurie prevented him from entering the altar through the royal gates, telling him that a king can only do it with a crown on his head and with his wife Princess Elena of Greece, criticizing his extra-marital relations. The king has never forgiven this; he has created a campaign against Gurie, exaggerating what has happened before. He was accused of abuses and lack of management, being investigated by the Cassation Court, who never conducted the investigation to the end. At the press of the king, on 11 November 1936, the Holy Synod, led by Patriarch Miron Cristea, suspended him not taking into account the letter sent by him. Only the Legionnaires and a high prelate were in his defense.

== Early days ==
Grosu was born in Nimoreni, Bessarabia Governorate, Russian Empire. He studied at the Spiritual School (1888-1882) and at the Theological Seminary of Chișinău (1892-1898), then from 1898 to 1902 at the Spiritual Academy in Kiev, founded by Romanian Metropolitan Petru Movilă, where he obtained the degree of the Master of Theology.

== Pedagogical and spiritual activity ==
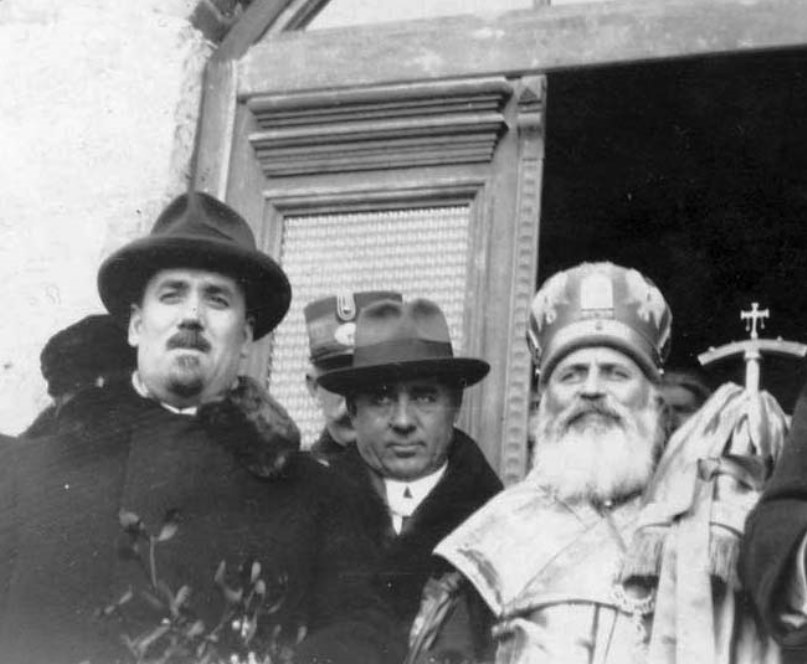
Grosu (right)during a religious event în Nisporeni, 1930.

In 1902, he was ordained in the Noul Neamț Monastery of Chițcani, ordained hieromonk and called "eparchial missionary" (1902), later he was ordained protocell and archimandrite (1909). One of his merits was obtaining the establishment of an eparchial printing press (1896) "The Illuminator" in Chișinău (1908). He was the Prior at St. Abram Abbey in Smolensk (1909) and the director of the teacher-training school (normal schools) of the Gruševsk (1910-1914) and Samovka (1914-1917) and the professor of Romanian language in Chișinău (1917-1918) and the militant of Romanianism, as Deputy Minister of Justice in the Provisional Government of Chișinău. On 4 July 1918 was elected by the Holy Synod of Bucharest, as Pontiff Vicar of the Metropolitan Church of Moldova, with the title "Botoșăneanul" (ordained at Iaşi on 15 July 1918). In 1919 he was appointed Pontiff Vicar of the archiepiscopacy of Chișinău (with the title "Bălți"). On 1 January 1920 the Pontiff of Chisinau and Hotin, and on 21 February 1920, was elected as a full holder (enthroned in 1921), and from 28 April 1928 he became Metropolitan of Bessarabia, ministering by 11 November 1936, when he was retired. He died on 14 November 1943 in Bucharest.

== Memory ==
In 2015, his bust was installed on the Alley of Ecclesiastical Personalities in Chișinău; it was cast in bronze by sculptor Veaceslav Jiglițchi and placed on a pedestal made of Cosăuți stone, crafted by folk master Veaceslav Lozan.

== Works ==
- Carte de învățătură despre legea lui Dumnezeu alcătuită după mai multe manuale rusești, Chișinău, 1908.
- Bucoavnă moldovenească. Chișinău, 1909.
- Abecedar moldovenesc Chișinău, 1917, (în colaborare; ed. a II-a şi a III-A, cu litere latine, în 1918, ed. a VII-a în 1922).
- Rugăciune și lămurirea lor, Chișinău, 1920, 44 p..
- Despre omul "trupesc", "sufletesc" și "duhovnicesc". Chișinău, 1924.
- Istoria sfântă a Vechiului și Noului Testament, Chișinău, 1924 (și alte ediții).
- Slujirea lui Dumnezeu a unui preot bun, după Părintele loan de Cronstadt, Chișinău, 1925.
