= Alexandrina Ciocan =

Moldovan footballer

Personal information
- Birth name: Alexandrina Vutcariova
- Date of birth: 7 January 1995 (age 31)
- Position: Forward

Senior career*
Years	Team	Apps	(Gls)
- Noroc

International career^{‡}
2010–2011	Moldova U17	6	(0)
2011–2012	Moldova U19	3	(0)
2015–	Moldova	1	(0)
- * Club domestic league appearances and goals ‡ National team caps and goals as of 30 August 2018

Alexandrina Ciocan (née Vutcariova; born 7 January 1995) is a Moldovan footballer who plays as a forward. She has been a member of the Moldova women's national team.
