= Izbiște =

- Village
- Location within Moldova
- Coordinates: 47°13′24″N 29°00′03″E
- Country: Moldova
- District: Criuleni District

Government
  - Mayor: Ion Plămădeală (PDM)

Population (2014 census)
  - Total: 2,727
- Time zone: UTC+2 (EET)
  - Summer (DST): UTC+3 (EEST)

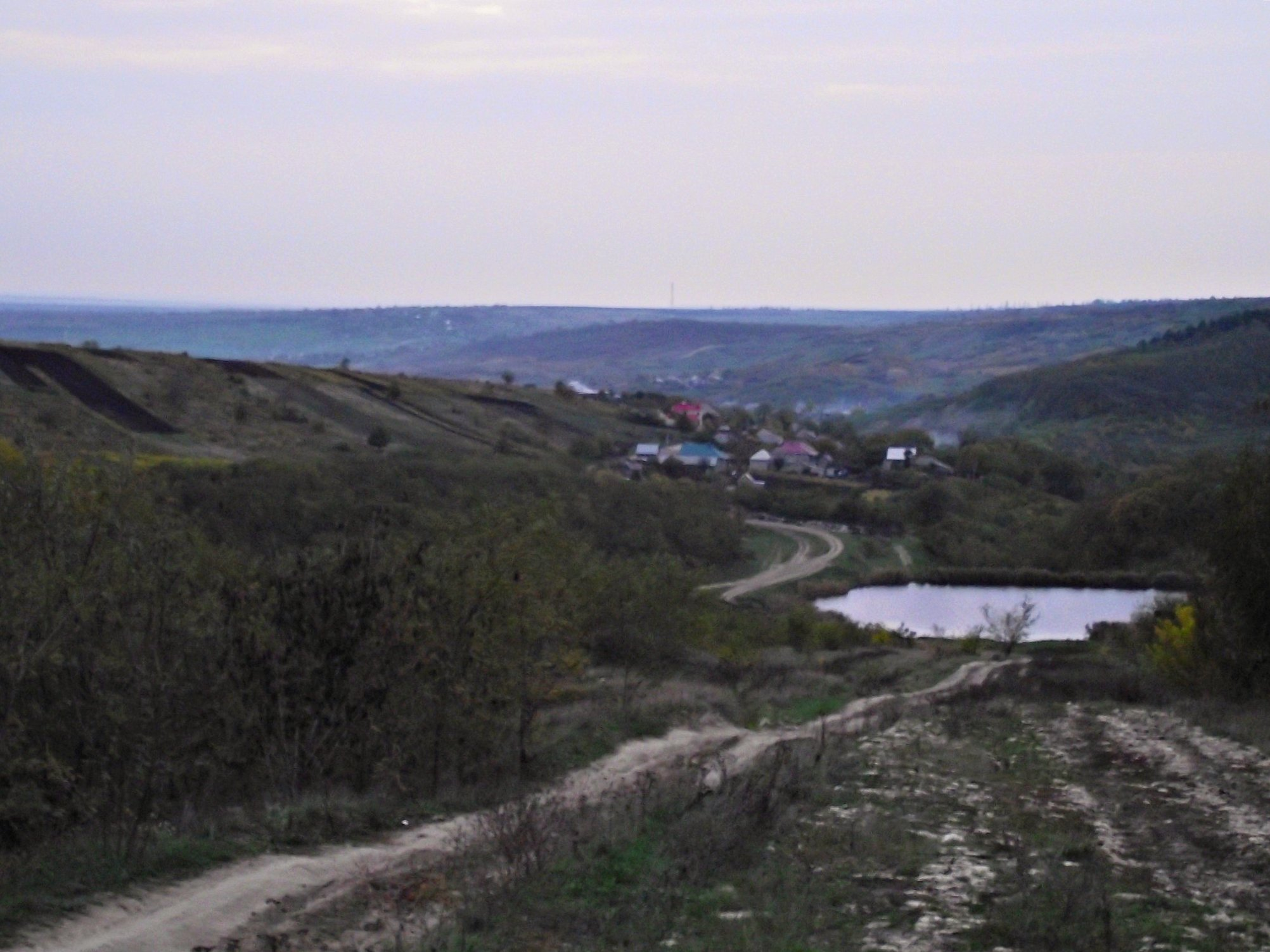
Unnamed Road, Izbişte, Moldova

Izbiște is a village in Criuleni District, Moldova.
