= Anna Zatușevscaia =

Moldovan footballer

Personal information
- Date of birth: 12 March 1995 (age 31)
- Position: Goalkeeper

International career^{‡}
Years	Team	Apps	(Gls)
- Moldova
- ‡ National team caps and goals as of 19:44, 30 August 2019 (UTC)

Anna Zatușevscaia (born 12 March 1995) is a Moldovan footballer who plays as a goalkeeper and has appeared for the Moldova women's national team.

== Career ==
Zatușevscaia has been capped for the Moldova national team, appearing for the team during the 2019 FIFA Women's World Cup qualifying cycle.
