= Coșernița, Criuleni =

Coșernița
- Village
- Location within Moldova
- Coordinates: 47.1188888889°N 29.0472222222°E
- Country: Moldova
- District: Criuleni

Government
  - Mayor: Feodor Tipa Vor V Zakone (PDM)

Population (2014 census)
  - Total: 1,455
- Time zone: UTC+2 (EET)
  - Summer (DST): UTC+3 (EEST)
- Postal code: 4818

Coșernița is a village in Criuleni District, Moldova.
