= Boșcana =

- Commune
- Location within Moldova
- Coordinates: 47.1241666667°N 29.0072222222°E
- Country: Moldova
- District: Criuleni

Government
  - Mayor: Vîntu Anatolie (PEMAVE)
- Elevation: 22 m (72 ft)

Population (2014)
  - Total: 3,390
- Time zone: UTC+2 (EET)
  - Summer (DST): UTC+3 (EEST)

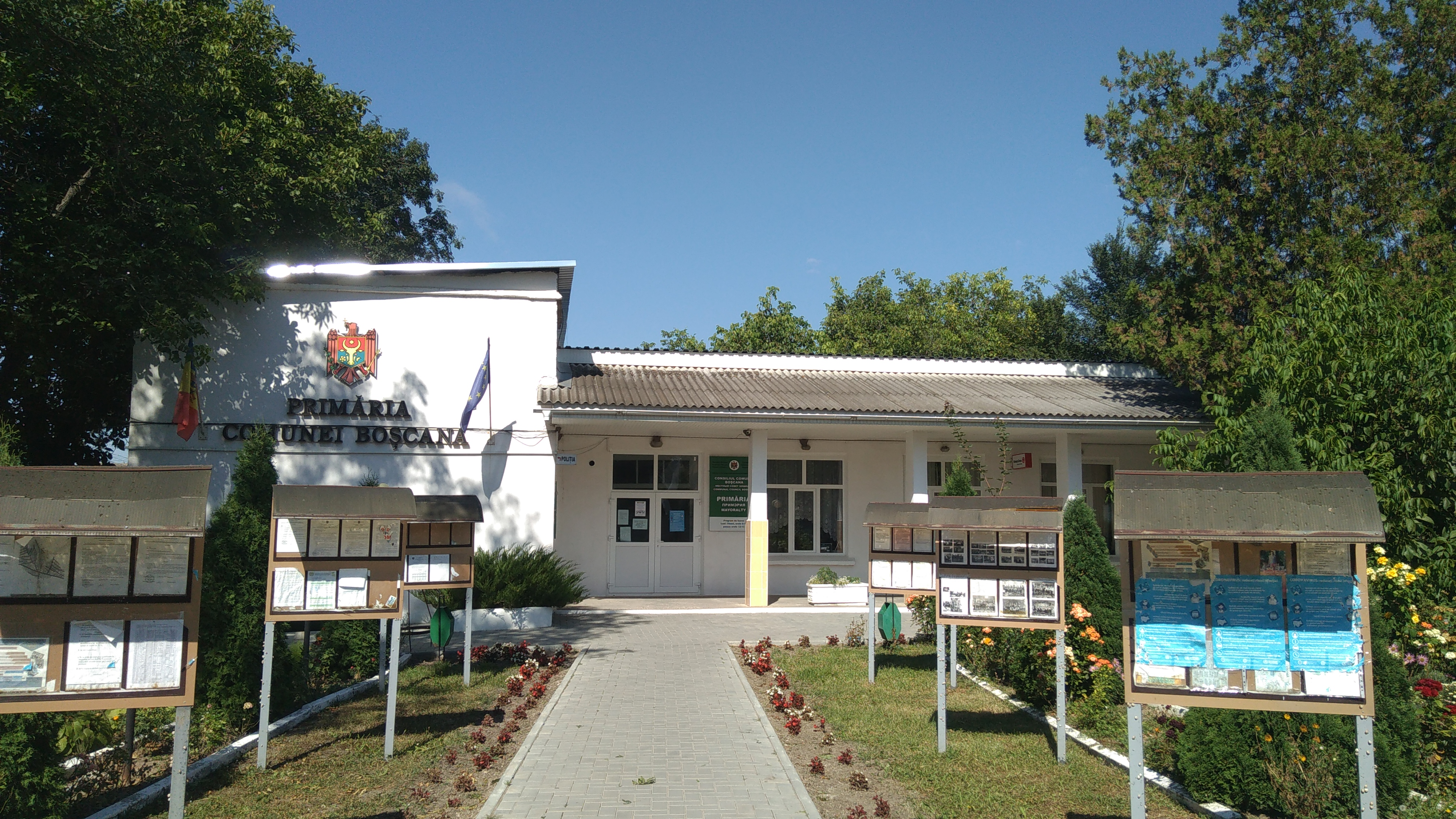
Boșcana commune town hall, Criuleni district

Boșcana is a commune in Criuleni District, Moldova. It is composed of two villages, Boșcana and Mărdăreuca.
