= Mașcăuți =

- Village
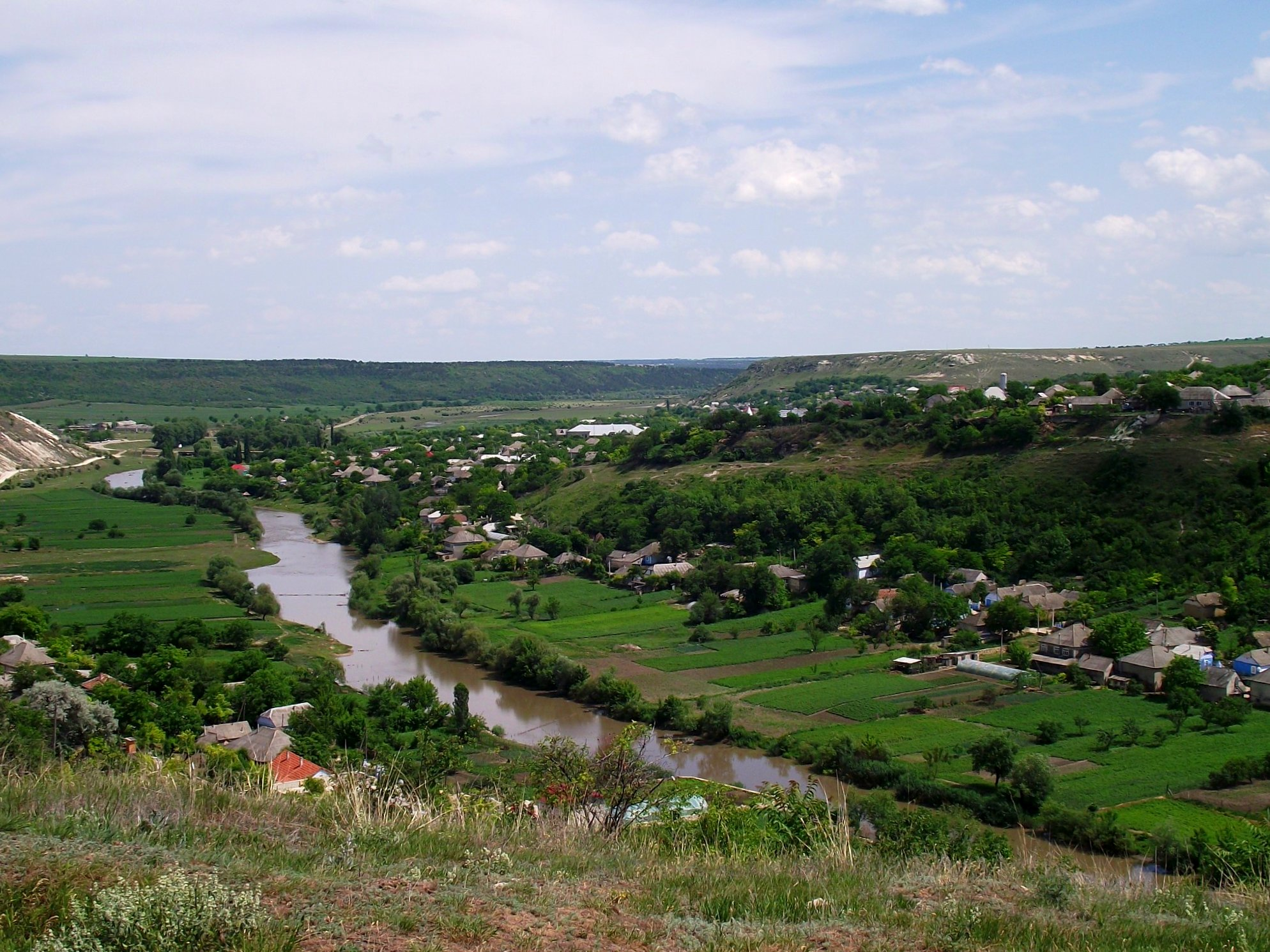

- Location within Moldova
- Coordinates: 47.2911111111°N 28.9963888889°E
- Country: Moldova
- District: Criuleni District

Government
  - Mayor: Valeriu Carțîn (PLDM)

Population (2014 census)
  - Total: 1,838
- Time zone: UTC+2 (EET)
  - Summer (DST): UTC+3 (EEST)

Mașcăuți is a village in Criuleni District, Moldova.

== See also ==
- Mashkautsan
