= Bălțata, Criuleni =

Bălțata
- Commune
- Location within Moldova
- Coordinates: 47.0511111111°N 29.0516666667°E
- Country: Moldova
- District: Criuleni District

Population (2014)
  - Total: 1,750
- Time zone: UTC+2 (EET)
  - Summer (DST): UTC+3 (EEST)

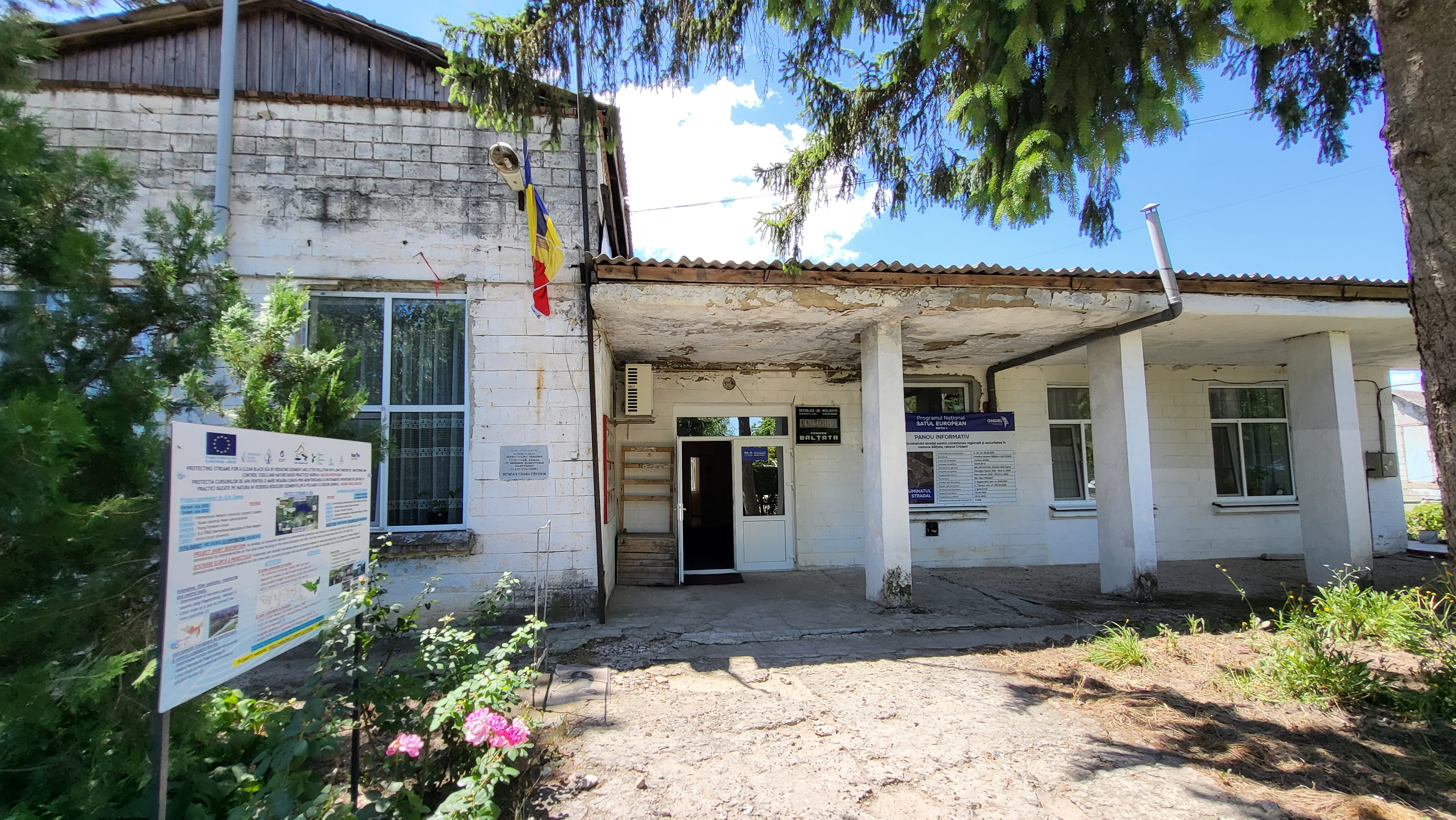
Bălțata town hall

Bălțata is a commune in Criuleni District, Moldova. It is composed of four villages: Bălțata, Bălțata de Sus, Sagaidac and Sagaidacul de Sus.

== Climate ==
Climate data for Bălțata (1991–2020, extremes 1954–2021)
Month	Jan	Feb	Mar	Apr	May	Jun	Jul	Aug	Sep	Oct	Nov	Dec	Year
Record high °C (°F)	15.0 (59.0)	22.6 (72.7)	25.9 (78.6)	32.2 (90.0)	35.5 (95.9)	37.8 (100.0)	39.2 (102.6)	39.6 (103.3)	37.4 (99.3)	30.1 (86.2)	25.2 (77.4)	17.1 (62.8)	39.6 (103.3)
Mean daily maximum °C (°F)	1.6 (34.9)	3.9 (39.0)	9.9 (49.8)	17.2 (63.0)	23.1 (73.6)	26.8 (80.2)	29.1 (84.4)	29.0 (84.2)	23.0 (73.4)	16.1 (61.0)	8.7 (47.7)	3.2 (37.8)	16.0 (60.8)
Daily mean °C (°F)	−1.8 (28.8)	−0.2 (31.6)	4.4 (39.9)	10.8 (51.4)	16.4 (61.5)	20.3 (68.5)	22.3 (72.1)	21.8 (71.2)	16.3 (61.3)	10.3 (50.5)	4.8 (40.6)	−0.1 (31.8)	10.4 (50.7)
Mean daily minimum °C (°F)	−5.1 (22.8)	−3.9 (25.0)	−0.5 (31.1)	4.5 (40.1)	9.6 (49.3)	13.7 (56.7)	15.6 (60.1)	14.6 (58.3)	10.0 (50.0)	5.0 (41.0)	1.3 (34.3)	−3.3 (26.1)	5.1 (41.2)
Record low °C (°F)	−30.5 (−22.9)	−30.5 (−22.9)	−21.0 (−5.8)	−9.5 (14.9)	−2.5 (27.5)	3.3 (37.9)	6.4 (43.5)	3.5 (38.3)	−5.7 (21.7)	−9.9 (14.2)	−16.6 (2.1)	−25.6 (−14.1)	−30.5 (−22.9)
Average precipitation mm (inches)	29 (1.1)	24 (0.9)	30 (1.2)	33 (1.3)	50 (2.0)	68 (2.7)	63 (2.5)	48 (1.9)	45 (1.8)	40 (1.6)	37 (1.5)	34 (1.3)	501 (19.7)
Average precipitation days (≥ 1.0 mm)	6	5	6	5	7	7	6	5	5	5	5	6	67
Average relative humidity (%)	82	80	75	66	63	66	66	65	69	74	82	84	73
Mean monthly sunshine hours	70	96	155	210	283	301	326	308	220	162	81	65	2,277
Source 1: NOAA
Source 2: Serviciul Hidrometeorologic de Stat (extremes, relative humidity)
