= Corjova, Criuleni =

Corjova
- Village
- Location in Moldova
- Coordinates: 47°05′47″N 29°10′17″E
- Country: Moldova
- District: Criuleni District

Population (2014 census)
  - Total: 2,457
- Time zone: UTC+2 (EET)
  - Summer (DST): UTC+3 (EEST)

Corjova is a village in Criuleni District, Moldova.
