= Bălăbănești, Criuleni =

Bălăbănești
- Commune
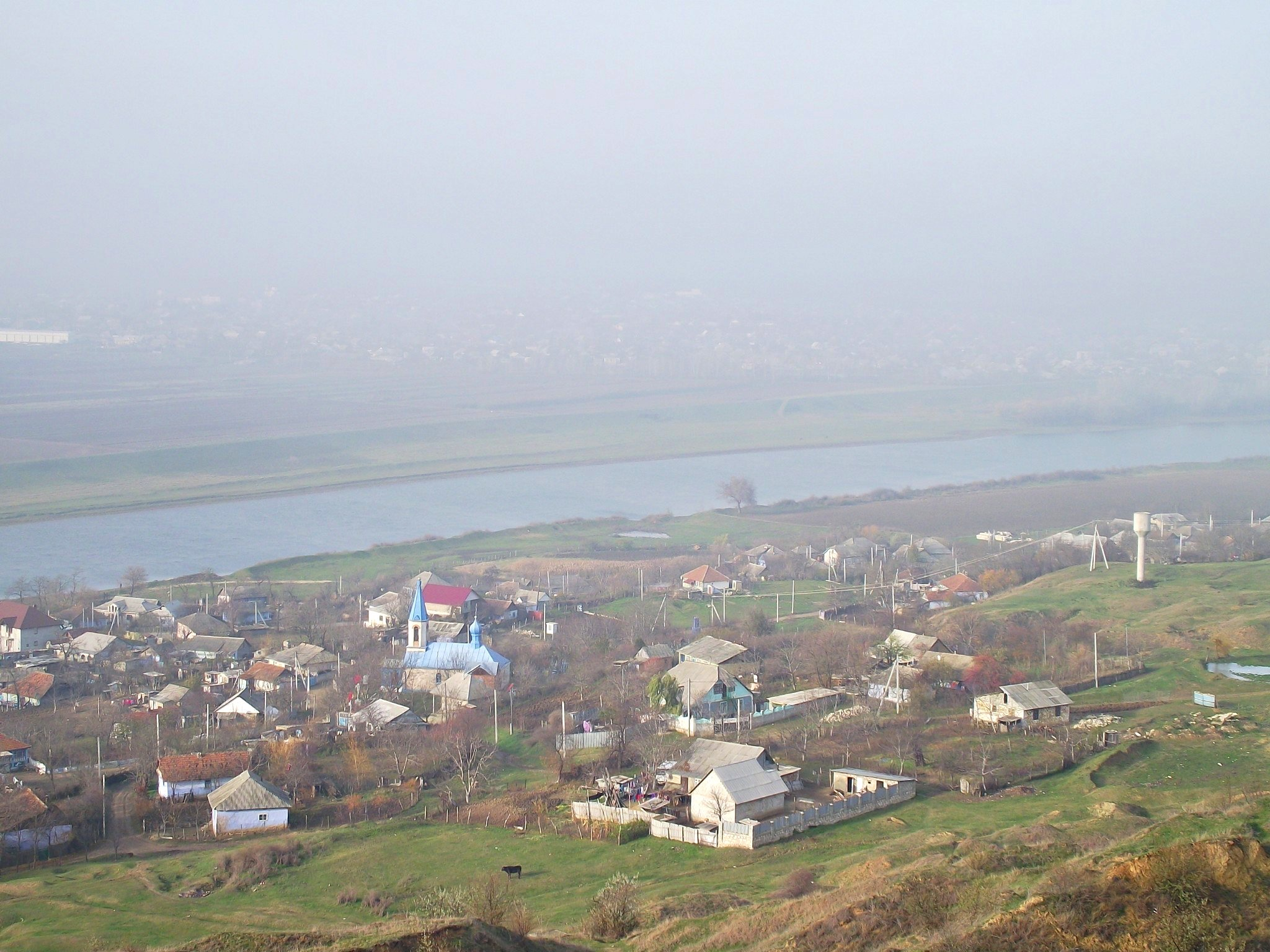

- Location within Moldova
- Coordinates: 47.0683333333°N 29.1319444444°E
- Country: Moldova
- District: Criuleni

Government
  - Mayor: Nistrean Ivan (PL)

Population (2014)
  - Total: 3,533
- Time zone: UTC+2 (EET)
  - Summer (DST): UTC+3 (EEST)

Bălăbănești is a commune in Criuleni District, Moldova. It is composed of three villages: Bălăbănești, Mălăiești and Mălăieștii Noi.
