= Răculești =

- Commune
- Location within Moldova
- Coordinates: 47.2705555556°N 29.0677777778°E
- Country: Moldova
- District: Criuleni District

Population (2014)
  - Total: 1,631
- Time zone: UTC+2 (EET)
  - Summer (DST): UTC+3 (EEST)

Răculești is a commune in Criuleni District, Moldova. It is composed of two villages, Bălășești and Răculești.
