= ARF Criuleni =

ARF Criuleni Women's
- Full name: Academia Raionala de Fotbal Criuleni
- Dissolved: 2016

Academia Raionala de Fotbal Criuleni Women's was a women's football club from Criuleni, Moldova. It plays in the country's top-level league and won the championship for the first time in 2015–16. The team played the qualifying round of the 2016–17 UEFA Women's Champions League, earning a draw against Irish Wexford Youths. The team apparently then folded and did not return for the following season.

== Titles ==
- Moldovan Championship: 2015–16
