= Criuleni District =

Coordinates: 47°10′N 29°00′E

Criuleni
- District (Raion)
- Flag Coat of arms

- Country: Republic of Moldova
- Administrative center (oraș-reședință): Criuleni
- Established: 2002

Government
  - Raion President: Alexandru Carțîn (PAS, 2023)

Area
  - Total: 687.9 km^{2} (265.6 sq mi)
  - Water: 12.8 km^{2} (4.9 sq mi) 1.86%
- Elevation: 265 m (869 ft)

Population (2024)
  - Total: 52,926
  - Density: 76.94/km^{2} (199.3/sq mi)
- Time zone: UTC+2 (EET)
  - Summer (DST): UTC+3 (EEST)
- Area code: +373 48
- Car plates: CR
- Website: www.criuleni.md

Criuleni (Romanian pronunciation: [kri.uˈlenʲ]) is a district (Romanian: raion) in the central part of Moldova, with the administrative center at Criuleni. As of the 2024 Moldovan census, its population was 52,926.

== Etymology ==
The name is said to come from the love story of Criu and Lenuța, two young people from neighboring towns whose parents forbade them to marry. Finding no other solution, they were thrown into the river Nistru. The parents and relatives of the two came to the river and wept, understanding the tragedy they had caused. After some time, these parents and relatives, wanting to be closer to their loved ones, named the city after the two. Eventually, the name became Criuleni.

== History ==
The first human settlements occurred in the administrative area today, still millennium III-II BC. In the fourteenth century, the region was ruled today by the Golden Horde, but by the end of the century after heavy fighting, horde is forced to leave the territory ruled. In 1393 Prince of Moldavia Roman I is named "Prince of Moldavia, from the Carpathians to the sea (Black Sea)" The villages in the district with the oldest documentary attestation are Bălășești, Jevreni, Mascauti and Riscova, historically documented localities for the first time 1435–1436. 16th-18th centuries, the region is developing as peripherals of Principality of Moldova, but all is an important custom on the Nistru, the culture (to build the church), so there has been a significant increase in population. In 1812, after the Russo-Turkish War (1806-1812), is the occupation of Basarabia, Russian Empire during this period (1812–1917), there is an intense russification of the native population. In 1918 after the collapse of the Russian Empire, Bessarabia united with Romania in this period (1918–1940, 1941–1944), the district is part of the Chișinău County. In 1940 after Molotov–Ribbentrop Treaty, Basarabia is occupied by the USSR. In 1991 as a result of the proclamation of Independence of Moldova, part and residence of the Chisinau County (1991–2003), and in 2003 became administrative unit of Moldova.

== Geography ==
Criuleni District is located in the central part of Moldova. Does the neighborhood: in the north Orhei District, Dubăsari District in the east, south Anenii Noi District, in western Municipality of Chișinău, and Strășeni District. District is located within the eastern extremity of Central Moldavian Plateau, and northern part of Lower Nistru Plains. The landscape is characterized by intercalation of deep valleys and wide. On steep slopes erosion occurs, and landslides. Horizontal dismantling of relief averaged 1.0-1.5 km / km^{2}. Vertical dismemberment of the territory makes up an average of 120–130 m. The northern part of Lower Nistru Plain is characterized by absolute altitudes of 100–200 m by the presence of a flat and low relief fragmented. In some places, meet some narrow valleys, not too deep, valleys, whose depth does not exceed 20–30 m. Erosion occurs weak. Ravines have a limited spread, but the flat slope erosion processes are developed. District has deposits minerals: limestone, sand, gravel and clay. In the district are 10 mines acquisition of limestone blocks, and 7 operating sand quarries gravel and crushed stone. In places where limestone rocks appear on the surface karst processes develop. Absolute altitude between 265 m swing territory, and 40 m in the meadow Raut

=== Climate ===
The district is included in the temperate-Continental climate, characterized by winters with large variety of air temperature, with little snow, long, hot summers and not too large amounts of precipitation falling as rain, in general . Total solar radiation varies between 112-114 kcal/square cm per year. The average air temperature in the region is 9.6 °C (49 °F). The average temperature of the coldest month (January) is −3.6 °C (26 °F) and the warmest months (July) is 22 °C (72 °F). Absolute maximum temperature is 35.7 °C (96 °F) and the absolute minimum temperature is −20.9 °C (−6 °F).

=== Fauna ===
Typical European fauna characterized by: fox, hedgehog, badger, deer, wild boar, raccoon dog, less red deer, wildcat and wolf. From birds: stork, swan, hawk, starlings, gulls and others.

=== Flora ===
Forests occupy 12.0% of district area and are characterized by oak, English oak, maple, locust, linden, and more. Plants: fescue, mugwort, burdock, clover, nettle and others.

=== Rivers ===
District is located in the Nistru river basin, which crosses the district in the west, the main tributaries that cross the district are: Răut River (286 km) and Bîc River (155 km). There are 62 fountains, fountains mine 5060 and 23 springs.

== Administrative subdivisions ==
- Localities: 43
  - Administrative center: Criuleni
    - Cities: Criuleni
      - Villages: 18
  - Bălășești
  - Bălțata de Sus
  - Chetroasa
  - Ciopleni
  - Hîrtopul Mic
  - Logănești
  - Mărdăreuca
  - Mălăiești
  - Mălăieștii Noi
  - Ohrincea
  - Porumbeni
  - Ratuș
  - Sagaidac
  - Sagaidacul de Sus
  - Stețcani
  - Valea Coloniței
  - Valea Satului
  - Zolonceni
        - Communes: 24
  - Bălăbănești
  - Bălțata
  - Boșcana
  - Cimișeni
  - Corjova
  - Coșernița
  - Cruglic
  - Dolinnoe
  - Drăsliceni
  - Dubăsarii Vechi
  - Hîrtopul Mare
  - Hrușova
  - Ișnovăț
  - Izbiște
  - Jevreni
  - Mașcăuți
  - Măgdăcești
  - Miclești
  - Onițcani
  - Pașcani
  - Răculești
  - Rîșcova
  - Slobozia-Dușca
  - Zăicana

== Demographics ==
In the 2024 Census, the district population was 52,926 of which 9.5% urban and 90.5% rural population

=== Ethnic groups ===
Ethnic group	% of total
Moldovans *	85.4
Romanians *	10.8
Ukrainians	2.6
Russians	0.8
Gagauz	0.1
Bulgarians	0.1
Other	0.2
Undeclared	0.0

Footnote: * There is an ongoing controversy regarding the ethnic identification of Moldovans and Romanians.

=== Religion ===
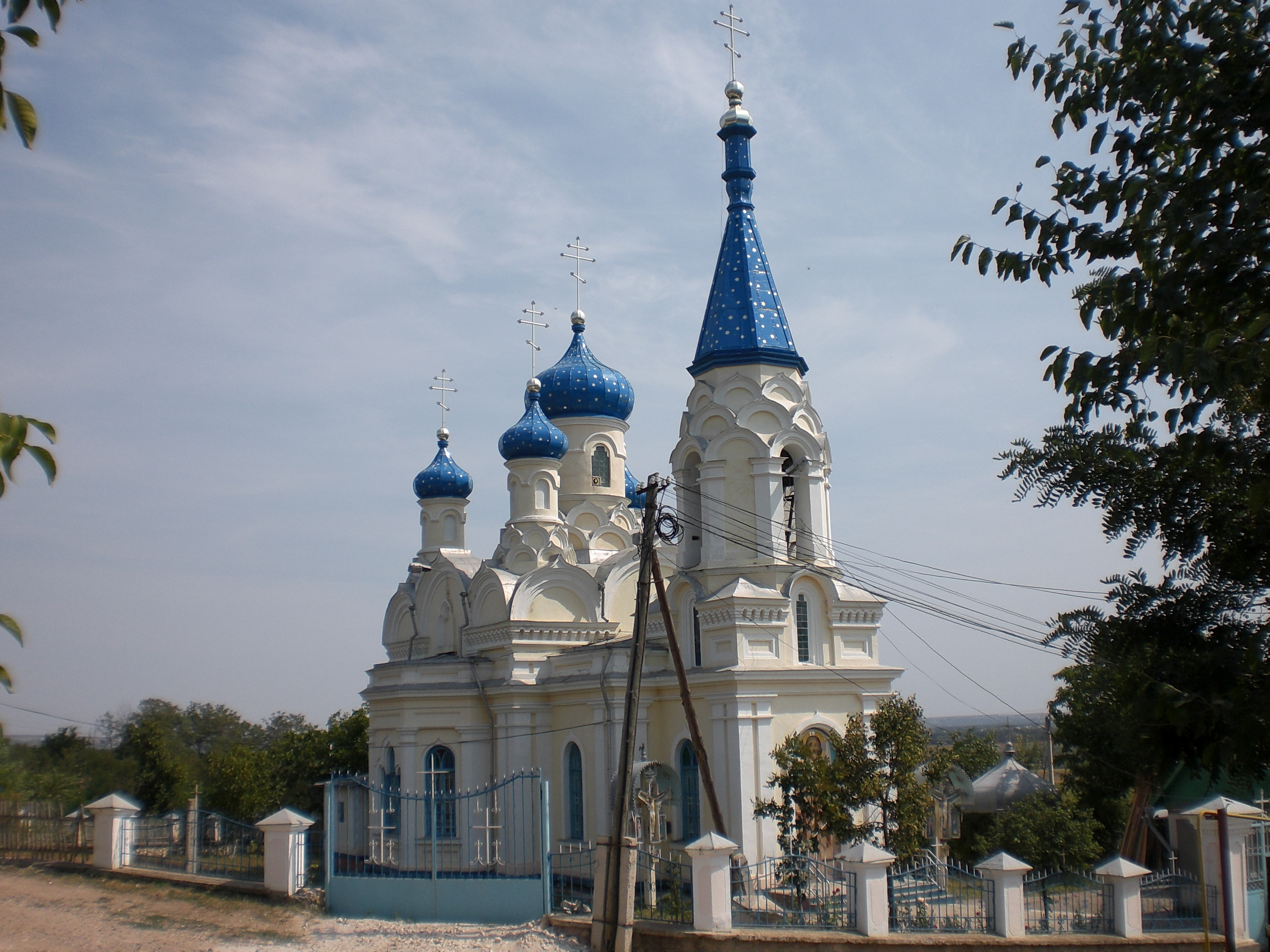
Onitcani Church

- Christians - 99.1%
  - Orthodox Christians - 97.8%
  - Protestant - 1.3%
- Other - 0.1%
- No Religion - 0.4%
- Not Declared - 0.4%

== Economy ==
District budget for 2007 the income was stated in the amount of 97,930,900. lei and amounted to 101,291,300 executed lei which also represents 103.4% and annual expenses specified amount constitutes 107,768,700 lei was performed in a volume of 102,999,300 lei at a rate of 95.6%. Were not allowed to pay debts. District budget for 2008 was set at income and expenses amounted to 87.4 mln. lei, with no deficit.

=== Agriculture ===
43,490 ha (63.2%) agricultural land, including 36,510 ha (53.0%) of arable land, orchards 2,511 ha (3.6%), 2,440 ha (3.5%) vineyards, walnut groves of 458,0 ha (0.7%), 5,390 ha (7.8%) grassland, 536,0 ha (0.8%) land for road transport, land destined fund 8,308 ha (12.0%) reserve.

== Culture ==
Network of cultural institutions include: 27 houses of culture and cultural centers, 30 libraries, three museums, four art schools. Cultural potential of the district is expressed by the honorary title of artistic collectives Model.

== Politics ==
Criuleni district, both political and electoral support of right-wing parties in Moldova represented by the AEI. PCRM is in a continuous fall in the last three elections.

During the last three elections AEI had an increase of 58.3%

Parliament elections results
Year	AEI	PCRM
2010	58.53% 21,371	33.77% 12,333
July 2009	61.43% 20,927	34.23% 11,661
April 2009	40.69% 13,506	45.40% 15,069

=== Elections ===
Summary of 28 November 2010 Parliament of Moldova election results in Criuleni District
Parties and coalitions	Votes	%	+/−
Party of Communists of the Republic of Moldova	12,333	33.37	−0.86
Liberal Democratic Party of Moldova	12,163	33.31	+16.46
Democratic Party of Moldova	4,118	11,28	-2.01
Liberal Party	4,032	11.04	−9.07
Party Alliance Our Moldova	1,058	2.90	−8.28
European Action Movement	1,002	2.74	+2.74
Other Party	1,824	4.96	+0.62
Total (turnout 62.75%)	36,792	100.00	

== Education ==
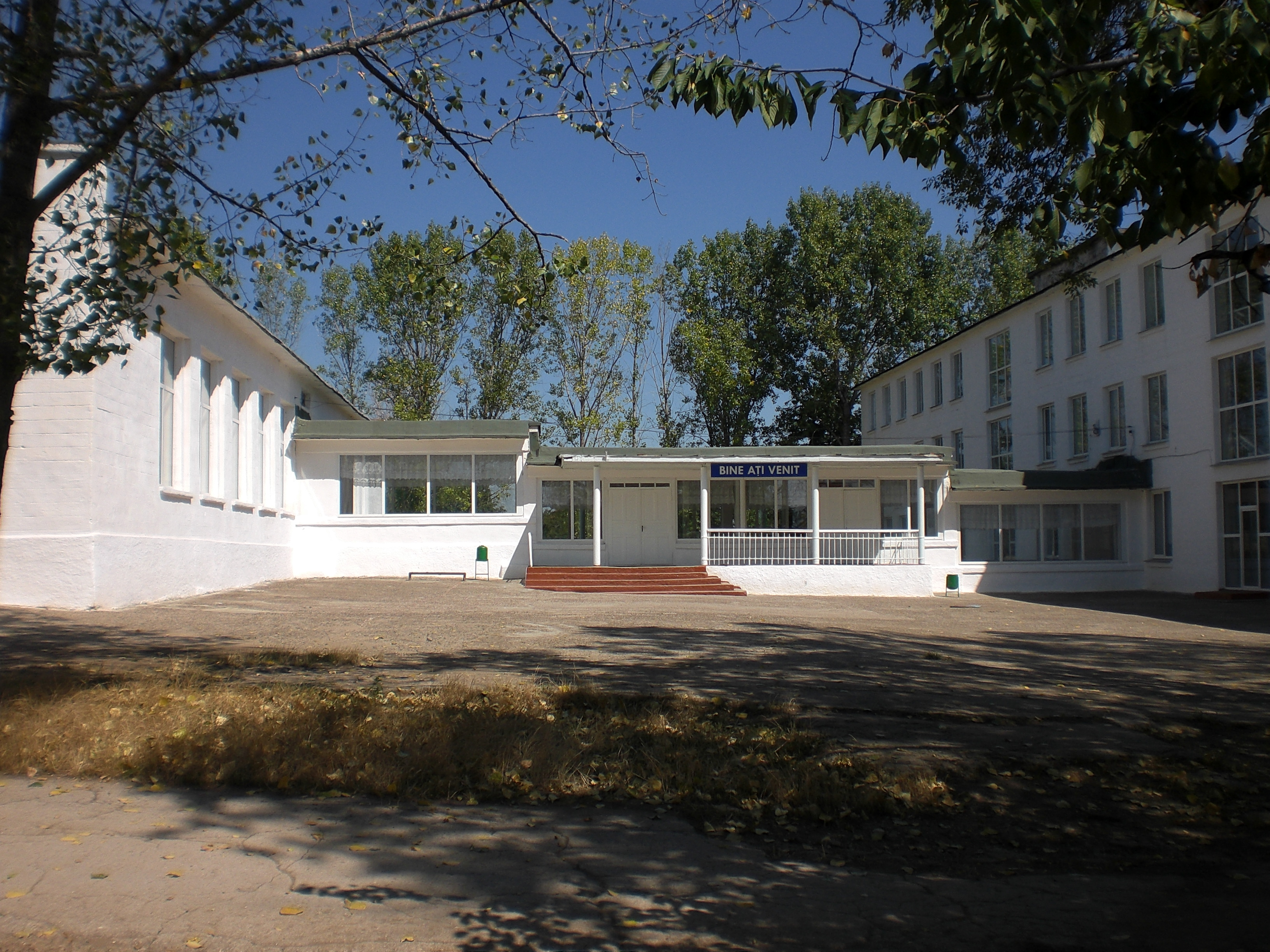
Onitcani high school

The district operates two sports schools, a school of leisure, 2 boarding schools, 29 kindergartens, with a contingent of 2098 children, 2 primary schools, 13 secondary schools, 9 secondary schools of general education, 10 schools with a contingent of 10 305 students.

== Health ==
In the territory there are 12 health centers, 17 Family doctor's offices, public health institution (District Hospital Criuleni)
