= Criuleni =

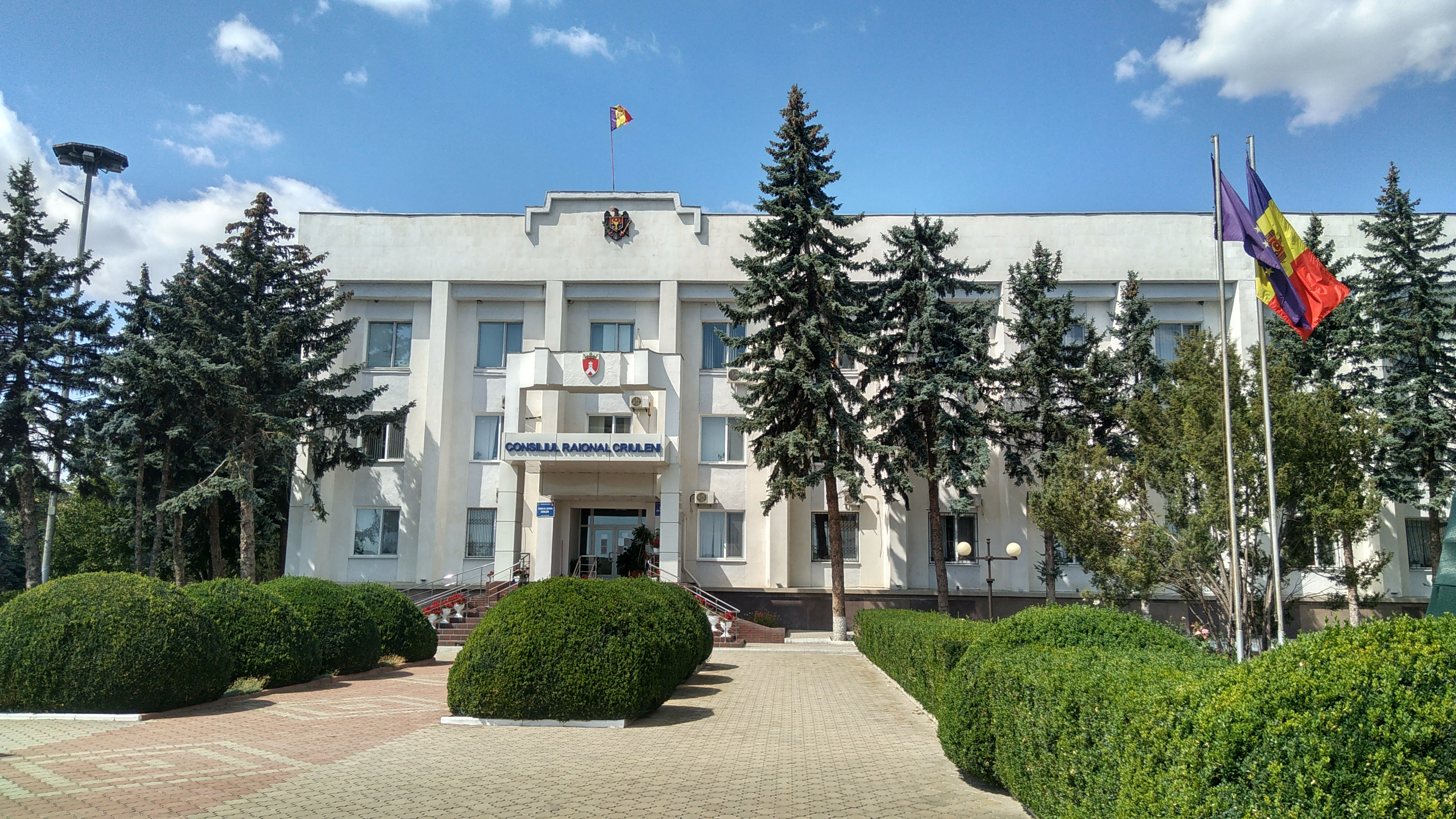

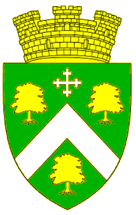
- Coat of arms

- Location within Moldova
- Coordinates: 47°13′2″N 29°09′5″E
- Country: Moldova
- District (Raion): Criuleni District

Area
  - Total: 42.6 km^{2} (16.4 sq mi)
  - Land: 43.25 km^{2} (16.70 sq mi)

Population (2014)
  - Total: 6,708
  - Density: 155.1/km^{2} (401.7/sq mi)
- Time zone: UTC+2 (EET)
  - Summer (DST): UTC+3 (EEST)
- Postal code: MD-4800
- Climate: Dfb

Criuleni (Romanian pronunciation: [kri.uˈlenʲ]) is a city in Moldova. It is located in the north-eastern part of the country. It is the largest city and administrative center of Criuleni District. Spread across an area of 42.6 km^{2} (16.4 sq mi), the town had a population of 6,708 inhabitants in 2014.

== Geography ==
Criuleni is located in Criuleni District of Moldova. It is located in the southeastern Europe and in the north-eastern part of Moldova. Spread across an area of 42.6 km^{2} (16.4 sq mi), it is the largest center of the district. It is one of 25 sub-divisions (city of Criuleni and 24 communes) in the district. It is part of the Bessarabia region.

== Demographics ==
According to the 2014 census, the population of Criuleni was 6,708 inhabitants, a decrease compared to the previous census in 2004, when 8,342 inhabitants were registered. Of these, 3,228 were men and 3,480 were women. About 1,136 inhabitants were under the age of fourteen, and 699 inhabitants were above the age of 65 years. About 84.6% of the population lived in urban areas. The town had an expatriate population of 418 individuals, of which 22 belonged to the European Union, 387 belonged to the Commonwealth of Independent States, and nine from other nations. The population is further projected to reduce over the next few decades. The city had a Human Development Index of 0.699 in 2015.

Moldovans formed the major ethnic group (86.3%), with Romanians (4.6%), Ukrainians (3.7%) and Russians (3.9%) forming a significant minority. Moldovan language was the most spoken language, spoken to by 4,332 (66.8%) inhabitants, with Romanian (22.1%) and Russian (9.2%) spoken by significant minorities. About 98.8% of the population followed Eastern Orthodox Christianity, and 1.2% of the population followed other religions.
