= Drăsliceni =

- Commune and village
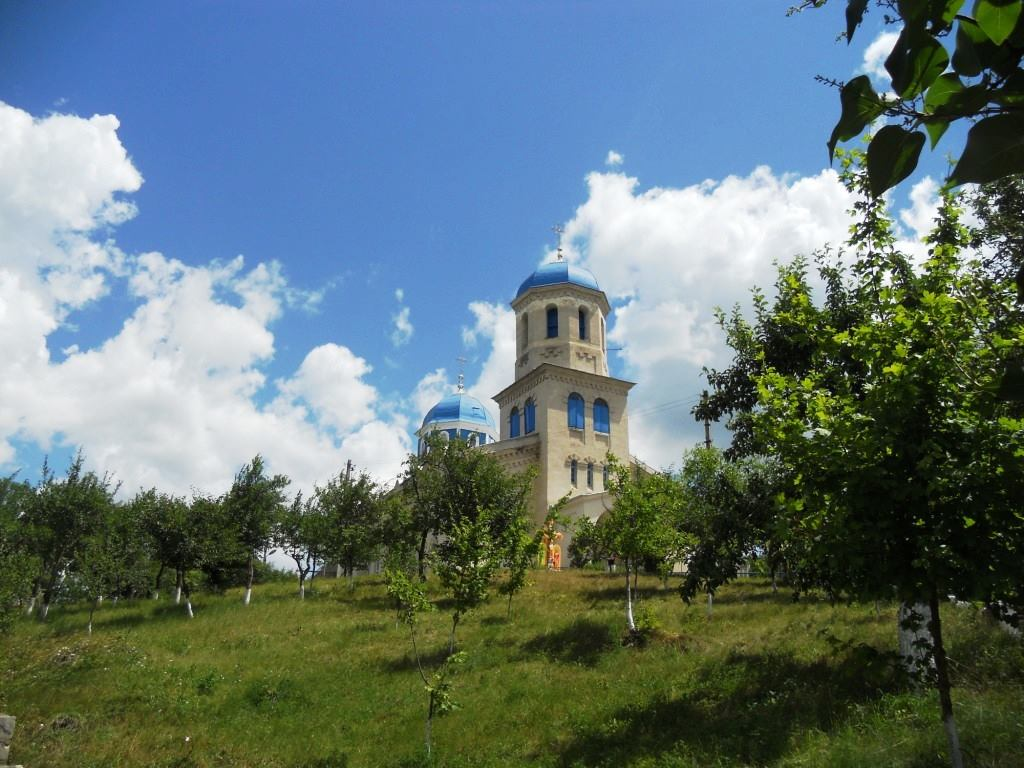
- Church of the Protection of the Mother of God, Drăsliceni

- Location in Moldova
- Coordinates: 47°09′N 28°47′E
- Country: Moldova
- District: Criuleni District

Population (2014)
  - Total: 3,221
- Time zone: UTC+2 (EET)
  - Summer (DST): UTC+3 (EEST)

Drăsliceni is a commune in Criuleni District, Moldova. It is composed of three villages: Drăsliceni, Logănești and Ratuș.

== History ==
The "For the Nation and Country Party", now called the Greater Moldova Party, was formed on May 5, 2007 in Ratuș.
