= FC Noroc Nimoreni =

Noroc Nimoreni
- Full name: FC Noroc Nimoreni
- Founded: 2008
- Ground: Stadionul Nimoreni
- Capacity: 1,000
- League: Moldovan Women's Football Championship
- 2021-22: 5th

FC Noroc Nimoreni is a women's football club from Nimoreni, Moldova. It competes in the Moldovan Women's Football Championship and won the championship for the first time in 2011–12. The completed the double by winning the national cup also. The team played the qualifying round of the 2012–13 UEFA Women's Champions League. They lost all matches though.

== Titles ==
- 3 Championship : 2011–12, 2014–15, 2016-17,
- 2 Moldovan Women's Cup : 2011–12, 2013–14

== Current squad ==
- As of 9 August 2015, according to UEFA's website''

Goalkeepers	Defenders	Midfielders	Forwards
1. (Moldova) Anna Zatuşevscaia. (Moldova) Daniela Cuțuruba	2. (Moldova) Maria Spînu; 4. (Moldova) Mihaela Guma; 5. (Moldova) Valeria Rusu; 15. (Moldova) Nadejda Chicu. (Moldova) Daria Meșina	6. (Moldova) Elena Cereşnea; 8. (Moldova) Eugenia Miron; 9. (Moldova) Viorica Tonu; 14. (Moldova) Ana Ciobanu	13. (Moldova) Alexandrina Ciocan; 16. (Moldova) Cristina Ștempliuc

== Record in UEFA competitions ==
Season	Competition	Stage	Result	Opponent
2012–13	Champions League	Qualifying Stage	0–6	(Finland) PK-35 Vantaa
2012–13	Champions League	Qualifying Stage	0–11	(Scotland) Glasgow City
2012–13	Champions League	Qualifying Stage	1–11	(Croatia) Osijek
2015–16	Champions League	Qualifying Stage	0–4	(Croatia) Osijek
2015–16	Champions League	Qualifying Stage	1–4	(Serbia) Spartak Subotica
2015–16	Champions League	Qualifying Stage	0–3	(Portugal) CF Benfica
2017–18	Champions League	Qualifying Stage	0–4	(Austria) Sturm Graz
2017–18	Champions League	Qualifying Stage	0–6	(Cyprus) Apollon Ladies
2017–18	Champions League	Qualifying Stage	0–1	(Bulgaria) NSA Sofia
