= Nimoreni =

- Commune and village
- Location in Moldova
- Coordinates: 47°01′N 28°40′E
- Country: Moldova
- District: Ialoveni District

Population (2014 census)
  - Total: 2,148
- Time zone: UTC+2 (EET)
  - Summer (DST): UTC+3 (EEST)

Nimoreni is a village in Ialoveni District, Moldova.

== Notable people ==
- Gurie Grosu
