= Ernie Sulastri =

Singaporean footballer

Personal information
- Full name: Ernie Sulastri Binte Sontaril
- Date of birth: 24 November 1988 (age 37)
- Place of birth: Singapore
- Height: 1.52 m (5 ft 0 in)
- Position: Defender

Senior career*
Years	Team	Apps	(Gls)
2001	SAFFC		
2013	Bunnys Kyoto		
2014	Speranza Osaka-Takatsuki		
2017	GFA Sporting Westlake		
2018	Tampines Changkat CSC		
2019-2020	Home United		
2021-2023	Lion City Sailors	26	(1)
2023	→ FC SWAT (loan)		
2024	Albirex Niigata (S)	12	(0)
2025	Still Aerion	6	(0)
2025	Selangor		

International career
2010-2023	Singapore	58	(0)

Managerial career
- 2023-present: Woodlands Sec. School
- 2026-present: SFA Combined Team
- * Club domestic league appearances and goals

Ernie Sulastri Binte Sontaril is a Singaporean women's footballer who plays as a defender.

She currently is the head coach of Woodlands Secondary School's girls team and National League's SFA Combined Team.

== Early life ==
Ernie was born in Singapore. She started playing football at the age of five. She started competing in the national street soccer league at the age of 12 and came in second. She started to play at club level at around 13-14 with Singapore Armed Forces Football Club.

== Club career ==
Ernie started her career with Singaporean side Singapore Armed Forces Football Club (SAFFC). She debuted for the club at the age of thirteen.

She went on to play for Singaporean clubs, like GFA Sporting Westlake, Tampines Changkat CSC and Home United, in the local leagues.

=== Japanese Clubs ===
From 2013 till 2014, Ernie Sulastri played in the Japan's Nadeshiko Challenge League representing Bunnys Kyoto SC (2013) and Speranza Osaka-Takatsuki FC (2014).

=== Lion City Sailors ===
Since Lion City Sailors Women's (LCS) team made their Women's Premier League debut in 2022, Ernie Sulastri was the captain of the team. The club went on to win the 2022 title undefeated, with two games to spare.

Before the start of the 2023 Women's Premier League, Ernie, along with Nur Izzati Rosni, signed with Malaysian amateur side FC SWAT. During their one-month stint, the duo helped FC Swat reach the quarter-finals of the competition. She was named Star of the match and Team of the Week once during her stint.

Ernie went on to lead LCS to their 2nd consecutive Women's Premier League title with two games remaining. The club remains unbeaten throughout the 2023 season.

Lions City Sailors announced that the skipper will be leaving the club on 23 January 2024.

=== 2024 to present ===
On 29 February 2024, Albirex Niigata (S) announced the signing of Ernie for the 2024 season. Although Ernie has been playing mainly as a defender in her career, she was listed as a midfielder on Albirex Niigata's website. Ernie wanted the chance to work under and learn from former Japan International Kana Kitahara.

Ernie played for Still Aerion in the 2025 Women's Premier League before signing with Selangor during mid-season.

Ernie Sulastri was named Best Player of the Kuala Lumpur Women’s Tourism International Cup 2026, after leading Singa Legends to a 3-2 victory over Hulu Kelang in the final.

== International career ==
Ernie made her national debut in 2010. She has captained the Singapore women's national football team.

Ernie reached her 50th cap milestone after representing Singapore in the match against Malaysia in the 2022 AFF Women's Championship opener on 4 July 2022.

The 32nd SEA Games was the last time that Ernie represented Singapore. She had already earned 56 caps before the start of the Games. Ernie went on to play as a substitute against Thailand and Cambodia, earning her 58th cap.

== Managerial career ==
Ernie was actively involved in coaching while she was still playing in club and international football.

She joined Singapore Football Club (SFC) on 13 August 2021 as one of the academy's senior coaches.

She has been one of the coaches since the School Football Academy (SFA) program started in 2022. She started coaching Woodlands Secondary School after the school joined as one of the two pioneer girls’ SFA program.

Ernie was selected as one of the eight coaches for the 2026 Coach Overseas Attachment program, who have secured coaching attachments to either Belgian Pro League side Oud-Heverlee Leuven or Austrian club SKN St. Pölten. From February to mid-July, she was attached to Austrian club SKN St. Pölten, working with the club's men's, women's and youth teams.

She is currently the head coach of Woodlands Secondary School, a combined SFA girls’ U-14 team and the SFA Combined Girls team that was competing in the 2026 Women's National League.

== Style of play ==
Ernie mainly operates as a defender. She has also operated as a midfielder while playing for the Singapore women's national football team.

== After football ==
She was a physical education teacher for children with autism. She later resigned and became the founder of SingaChamps, a sports and arts initiative for youth with autism.

== Personal life ==
Ernie is the daughter of a former Singaporean footballer, who played as goalkeeper at club level.

== Honours ==
Lion City Sailors

- Women's Premier League: 2022, 2023

Individual

- Best Player of the Kuala Lumpur Women's Tourism International Cup: 2026

Records

- National team most-capped player: 58 caps (Note: Tied with Rosnani Azman (as of 21 Sep 2026))

== See also ==
- Singapore women's national football team

== External Link ==
- Ernie Sulastri on Instagram
- Ernie Sulastri on Global Sports Archive
- Let's Go Lionesses - Ep 1 - Live With No Regrets
