= 2025 in Singaporean football =

Football in Singapore
- Season: 2025–26

Men's football
- Singapore Premier League: Lion City Sailors
- Singapore Premier League 2: Albirex Niigata (S) II
- Singapore Football League One: Singapore Cricket Club
- Singapore Football League Two: Bishan Barx FC
- Island Wide League: Gymkhana FC
- Singapore Cup: Lion City Sailors
- FA Cup: Warwick Knights

Women's football
- Women's Premier League: Albirex Niigata (S)
- Women's National League: Mattar Sailors FC

An overview of the 2025 season of the competitive association football season in Singapore.

In response to changes in Asian Football Confederation Club Competitions and potential FIFA International Calendar amendments, FAS announced that the league calendar will undergo a two-year transition process. The 2024-25 season was played from 10 May 2024 to 25 May 2025, the first time that a season was scheduled over a two-year period.

The 2025-26 season would then align with AFC Club Competitions, starting in August 2025 and concluding in May 2026, setting the timeline for subsequent seasons. This move is important in terms of aligning transfer windows, as well as allowing for the easier calendaring of national or regional club tournaments.

Competitions involving Singapore Football League's and Women's teams remain unchanged.

== National teams ==
=== Singapore men's national football team ===
==== Results and fixtures ====
===== Friendlies =====
21 March 2025 Friendly	Singapore	0–1	Nepal	Kallang, Singapore
20:30 UTC+8		Report	Gillespye Jung Karki 12'	Stadium: National Stadium; Attendance: 5,078; Referee: Yūsuke Ohashi (Japan)

5 June 2025 Friendly	Singapore	3–1	Maldives	Bishan, Singapore
	Amirul Adli 7'; Ikhsan Fandi 20', 32'	Report	Ahmed Rizuvan 90+1' (pen.)	Stadium: Bishan Stadium; Attendance: 2,297; Referee: Razlan Joffri Ali (Malaysia)

4 September 2025 Friendly	Malaysia	0–3; Awarded (Note: Due to the Malaysian football naturalisation scandal, the FIFA Disciplinary Committee awarded the match as a 3–0 win to Singapore on 17 December 2025 as Malaysia fielded the ineligible players Gabriel Palmero, Facundo Garcés, Rodrigo Holgado, Joao Figueiredo and Jon Irazabal. The Football Association of Malaysia (FAM) were also fined CHF 10,000.)	Singapore	Kuala Lumpur, Malaysia
21:00 UTC+8		Report		Stadium: Bukit Jalil National Stadium; Attendance: 22,329; Referee: Ngô Duy Lân (Vietnam)

9 September 2025 Friendly (Note: Closed-door friendly)	Singapore	1–1	Myanmar	Kallang, Singapore
21:00 UTC+8	Ilhan Fandi 90'	Report	Thet Hein Soe 60'	Stadium: Jalan Besar Stadium; Attendance: 0

13 November 2025 Friendly	Thailand	3–2	Singapore	Pathum Thani, Thailand
19:30 UTC+7	Sarach Yooyen 15'; Theerathon Bunmathan 47'; Seksan Ratree 53'	Report	Glenn Kweh 17', 62'	Stadium: Thammasat Stadium; Attendance: 10,205; Referee: Hoàng Ngọc Hà (Vietnam)

===== 2027 AFC Asian Cup qualification =====
====== Group C ======
Pos	Team	Pld	W	D	L	GF	GA	GD	Pts	Qualification	(Singapore)	(Hong Kong)	(Bangladesh)	(India)
1	Singapore	6	4	2	0	8	4	+4	14	2027 AFC Asian Cup		0–0	1–0	1–1
2	Hong Kong	6	2	2	2	8	8	0	8		1–2		1–1	1–0
3	Bangladesh	6	1	2	3	6	8	−2	5		1–2	3–4		1–0
4	India	6	1	2	3	4	6	−2	5		1–2	2–1	0–0	

Source: AFC
Legend: Blue = home team win; Yellow = draw; Red = away team win.
Rules for classification: Tiebreakers

2025

25 March 2025 1	Singapore	0–0	Hong Kong	Kallang, Singapore
20:30 UTC+8		Report Report (AFC)		Stadium: National Stadium; Attendance: 8,064; Referee: Chae Sang-hyeop (South Korea)

10 June 2025 2	Bangladesh	1–2	Singapore	Dhaka, Bangladesh
19:00 UTC+6	Rakib Hossain 67'	Report Report (AFC)	Song Ui-young 45'; Ikhsan Fandi 58'	Stadium: National Stadium; Attendance: 21,317; Referee: Clifford Daypuyat (Philippines)

9 October 2025 3	Singapore	1–1	India	Kallang, Singapore
19:30 UTC+8	Ikhsan Fandi 45+1'	Report; Report (AFC)	Rahim Ali 90'	Stadium: National Stadium; Attendance: 13,232; Referee: Shen Yinhao (China)

14 October 2025 4	India	1–2	Singapore	Margao, India
19:30 UTC+5:30	Lallianzuala Chhangte 14'	Report; Report (AFC)	Song Ui-young 44', 58'	Stadium: Jawaharlal Nehru Stadium; Attendance: 2,036; Referee: Mohamad Issa (Lebanon)

18 November 2025 5	Hong Kong	1–2	Singapore	Kowloon, Hong Kong
20:00 UTC+8	Matt Orr 15'	Report	Shawal Anuar 64'; Ilhan Fandi 67'	Stadium: Kai Tak Sports Park; Attendance: 47,762; Referee: Sivakorn Pu-udom (Thailand)

=== Singapore women's national football team ===
==== Results and fixtures ====
===== Friendlies =====
12 June 2025 Friendly (Note: Closed-door friendly)	Singapore	–	Hong Kong	Kallang, Singapore
				Stadium: Kallang Football Hub; Attendance: 0 (Behind-closed-doors)
Note: The closed-door friendly saw full squad rotation

15 June 2025 Friendly	Singapore	Abandoned	Hong Kong	Choa Chu Kang, Singapore
			Anke Leung 31'	Stadium: Choa Chu Kang Stadium
Note: Match abandoned due to inclement weather

25 October 2025 Friendly	Singapore	0–1	Saudi Arabia	Abu Dhabi, UAE
23:00 UTC+8		Report	Mobarak 80'	Stadium: 321 Sports Arena

29 October 2025 Friendly	Singapore	0–5	Saudi Arabia	Abu Dhabi, UAE
23:00 UTC+8		Report	Mukhayzin 22' (pen.); Mansour 56'; Al-Enezi 59'; Abdulrazak 82' (pen.); Al-Brahim 84'	Stadium: 321 Sports Arena

25 November 2025 Friendly	Singapore	9–0	Seychelles	Bukit Gombak, Singapore
19:30 UTC+8	F. Ruhaizat; S. Zu’risqha; R. Azman; S. Rosielin; (o.g.)	Report		Stadium: Bukit Gombak Stadium; Attendance: 0 (Behind-closed-doors)

28 November 2025 Friendly	Singapore	7–0	Seychelles	Bukit Gombak, Singapore
19:30 UTC+8	L.X. Lim 13'; F. Ruhaizat 16'; S. Zu’risqha 36', 40'; D. Tan 51', 71'; S. Nurinsyirah 65'	Report		Stadium: Bukit Gombak Stadium

===== 2026 AFC Women's Asian Cup qualification =====
====== Group A ======
Pos	Team	Pld	W	D	L	GF	GA	GD	Pts	Qualification
1	Iran	4	3	0	1	14	5	+9	9 (Note: Head-to-head points: Iran 3, Jordan 0.)	Final tournament
2	Jordan (H)	4	3	0	1	13	2	+11	9	
3	Bhutan	4	2	0	2	6	13	−7	6 (Note: Head-to-head points: Bhutan 3, Lebanon 0.)	
4	Lebanon	4	2	0	2	5	7	−2	6	
5	Singapore	4	0	0	4	2	13	−11	0	

Source: AFC
Rules for classification: Qualification tiebreakers
(H) Hosts
Notes:

7 July 2025 1	Bhutan	3–2	Singapore	Amman, Jordan
16:00 UTC+3	Bidha 1'; Edon 67'; Rai 87'	Report	Ganeswaran 10'; Edon 26' (o.g.)	Stadium: King Abdullah II Stadium

10 July 2025 2	Singapore	0–4	Iran	Amman, Jordan
16:00 UTC+3		Report	Ghohrood 18'; Didar 47'; Zaharin 77' (o.g.); Ghanbari 86'	Stadium: King Abdullah II Stadium

13 July 2025 3	Jordan	5–0	Singapore	Amman, Jordan
19:00 UTC+3	Jbarah 9', 64'; Al-Bitar 43'; Al-Jamaeen 66'; Sweilem 84'	Report		Stadium: King Abdullah II Stadium

19 July 2025 4	Singapore	0–1	Lebanon	Amman, Jordan
16:00 UTC+3		Report	Iskandar 64'	Stadium: King Abdullah II Stadium

===== 2025 SEA Games =====
====== Group A ======
Pos	Team	Pld	W	D	L	GF	GA	GD	Pts	Qualification
1	Thailand (H)	2	2	0	0	10	0	+10	6	Advance to knockout stage
2	Indonesia	2	1	0	1	3	9	−6	3	Advance to knockout stage
3	Singapore	2	0	0	2	1	5	−4	0	
4	Cambodia	0	0	0	0	0	0	0	0	Withdrew

Source: Soccerway
(H) Hosts

7 December 2025 1	Singapore	1–3	Indonesia	Chonburi, Thailand
16:00 UTC+7	Ruhaizat 22'		Warps 31'; Scheunemann 62'; Aulia 90+5'	Stadium: IPE Chonburi Stadium; Referee: Esra'a Almbaidin (Jordan)

10 December 2025 2	Thailand	2–0	Singapore	Chonburi, Thailand
18:30 UTC+7	Kanyanat 9'; Orapin 18'	Report		Stadium: Chonburi Stadium; Referee: Rebecca Durcau (Australia)

== AFC competitions ==
=== AFC Champions League Two ===
==== Group phase ====
===== Lion City Sailors =====
Group G

Pos	Team	Pld	W	D	L	GF	GA	GD	Pts	Qualification
1	(Indonesia) Persib	6	4	1	1	11	6	+5	13	Advance to round of 16
2	(Thailand) Bangkok United	6	3	1	2	8	7	+1	10 (Note: Head-to-head points: Bangkok United 6, Lion City Sailors 0.)	Advance to round of 16
3	(Singapore) Lion City Sailors	6	3	1	2	10	8	+2	10	
4	(Malaysia) Selangor	6	0	1	5	7	15	−8	1	

Source: ACL2
Rules for classification: Tiebreakers
Notes:

18 September 2025 1	Persib (Indonesia)	1–1	(Singapore) Lion City Sailors	Bandung, Indonesia
19:15 UTC+7	Ramdani 47'	Report	L. Thy 90+2'	Stadium: Gelora Bandung Lautan Api Stadium; Attendance: 13,566; Referee: Hanna Hattab (Syria)

1 October 2025 2	Lion City Sailors (Singapore)	4–2	(Malaysia) Selangor	Bishan, Singapore
18:00 UTC+8	Lopes 7', 13', 45+4', 54'	Report	Chrigor 37' (pen.); Halim 73'	Stadium: Bishan Stadium; Referee: Chae Sang-hyeop (South Korea)

23 October 2025 3	Bangkok United (Thailand)	1–0	(Singapore) Lion City Sailors	Pathum Thani, Thailand
19:15 UTC+7	Al-Ghassani 63' (pen.); Zivkovic (penalty missed) 11'	Report	Hariss (red card) 62'	Stadium: True BG Stadium; Attendance: 1,006; Referee: Casey Reibelt (Australia)

6 November 2025 4	Lion City Sailors (Singapore)	1–2	(Thailand) Bangkok United	Bishan, Singapore
18:00 UTC+8	Thy 90+1'	Report	Al-Ghassani 45+2'; Adžić 82'	Stadium: Bishan Stadium; Attendance: 2,049; Referee: Ahmad Alaeddin (Lebanon)

26 November 2025 5	Lion City Sailors (Singapore)	3–2	(Indonesia) Persib	Bishan, Singapore
20:15 UTC+8	Thy 9'; Shawal 62'; Lopes 71'	Report	Putros 11'; Jung 56'	Stadium: Bishan Stadium; Attendance: 2,578; Referee: Ammar Mahfoodh (Bahrain)

10 December 2025 6	Selangor (Malaysia)	0–1	(Singapore) Lion City Sailors	Petaling Jaya, Malaysia
20:15 UTC+8		Report	Ndenge 50'	Stadium: Petaling Jaya Stadium; Attendance: 2,354; Referee: Hiroki Kasahara (Japan)

===== BG Tampines Rovers =====
Group H

Pos	Team	Pld	W	D	L	GF	GA	GD	Pts	Qualification
1	(Singapore) Tampines Rovers	6	5	1	0	14	5	+9	16	Advance to round of 16
2	(South Korea) Pohang Steelers	6	4	1	1	7	2	+5	13	Advance to round of 16
3	(Thailand) BG Pathum United	6	2	0	4	5	8	−3	6	
4	(Philippines) Kaya–Iloilo	6	0	0	6	4	15	−11	0	

Source: ACL2
Rules for classification: Tiebreakers

18 September 2025 1	Kaya–Iloilo (Philippines)	0–3	(Singapore) BG Tampines Rovers	Capas, Philippines
	Magnus Ravn (yellow card) 90+2'	Report	Trent Buhagiar 46', 73'; Takeshi Yoshimoto 52'; Koya Kazama (yellow card) 78'	Stadium: New Clark City Athletics Stadium; Attendance: 120; Referee: Ahmed Faisal Al-Ali (Jordan)

2 October 2025 2	BG Tampines Rovers (Singapore)	2–1	(Thailand) BG Pathum United	Bishan, Singapore
	Trent Buhagiar 42'; Hide Higashikawa 58'; Tallo Ngao (yellow card) 75'; Joel Chew (yellow card) 89'	Report	Sanchai Nontasila (yellow card) 56'	Stadium: Bishan Stadium; Attendance: 699; Referee: Bijan Heydari (Iran)

23 October 2025 3	BG Tampines Rovers (Singapore)	1–0	(South Korea) Pohang Steelers	Bishan, Singapore
	Hide Higashikawa 1'; Tallo Ngao (yellow card) 90+1'	Report	Jonathan Aspropotamitis (yellow card) 17'; Hwang Seo-woong (yellow card) 52'; Lee Dong-hee (yellow card) 65'; Cho Sang-hyeok (yellow card) 90+3'	Stadium: Bishan Stadium; Attendance: 887; Referee: Zaid Thamer Mohammed (Iraq)

6 November 2025 4	Pohang Steelers (South Korea)	1–1	(Singapore) BG Tampines Rovers	Pohang, South Korea
	Cho Sang-hyeok 85'; Kim Dong-jin (yellow card) 39'; Cho Jae-hun (yellow card) 83'	Report	Glenn Kweh 56'; Irfan Najeeb (yellow card) 42'; Tallo Ngao (yellow card) 90+5'	Stadium: Pohang Steel Yard; Attendance: 2,553; Referee: Akaml Buriev (Tajikistan)

27 November 2025 5	BG Tampines Rovers (Singapore)	5–3	(Philippines) Kaya–Iloilo	Bishan, Singapore
	Hide Higashikawa 7', 56'; Takeshi Yoshimoto 37'; Trent Buhagiar 47'; Faris Ramli 86'; Seiga Sumi (yellow card) 18'; Irfan Najeeb (yellow card) 29'	Report	Mike Ott 66'; Paolo Bugas 75'; Amirul Adli 85' (o.g.); Martini Rey (yellow card) 26'	Stadium: Bishan Stadium; Attendance: 1,069; Referee: Ahmad Yacoub Ibrahim (Jordan)

11 December 2025 6	BG Pathum United (Thailand)	0–2	(Singapore) BG Tampines Rovers	Pathum Thani, Thailand
	Sarach Yooyen (yellow card) 73'	Report	Koya Kazama 78'; Trent Buhagiar 85'; Glenn Kweh (yellow card) 72'	Stadium: True BG Stadium; Referee: Yahya Al-Mulla (United Arab Emirates)

==== Knockout phase ====
11 February 2026 Rd of 16 Leg 1	Công An Hà Nội (Vietnam)	0–3; Awarded (Note: The Cong An Hanoi v BG Tampines Rovers first leg, originally won 4–0 by Cong An Hanoi, was forfeited and awarded 3–0 to BG Tampines by the AFC Disciplinary Committee on 17 Feb 2026, as Cong An Hanoi fielded Stefan Mauk and China, even though they were suspended.)	(Singapore) BG Tampines Rovers	Hanoi, Vietnam
	Nguyễn Quang Hải 24', 27'; China 37'; Nguyen Dình Bac 90+2'; Filip Nguyen (yellow card) 90'	Report		Stadium: Hàng Đẫy Stadium; Attendance: 3,186; Referee: Zaid Thamer Mohammed (Iraq)

18 February 2026 Rd of 16 Leg 2	BG Tampines Rovers (Singapore)	3–1 (6–1 agg.)	(Vietnam) Công An Hà Nội	Jalan Besar, Singapore
	Hide Higashikawa 36', 60'; Trent Buhagiar 79'; Koya Kazama (yellow card) 45+3'; Takeshi Yoshimoto (yellow card) 45+4'; Yuki Kobayashi (yellow card) 69'	Report	Alan Grafite 77' (pen.) (yellow card) 34'; Léo Artur (red card) 52'; Lê Văn Đô (yellow card) 90+6'	Stadium: Jalan Besar Stadium; Attendance: 1,701; Referee: Kim Yu-jeong (South Korea)

5 March 2026 Quarter Final Leg 1	Bangkok United (Thailand)	2–1	(Singapore) BG Tampines Rovers	Pathum Thani, Thailand
	Kosović 11'; Picha 18'	Report	Buhagiar 80'	Stadium: Pathum Thani Stadium; Attendance: 1,153; Referee: Ryo Tanimoto (Japan)

12 March 2026 Quarter Final Leg 2	BG Tampines Rovers (Singapore)	2–2 (3–4 agg.)	(Thailand) Bangkok United	Jalan Besar, Singapore
	Buhagiar 39'; Kazama 71'	Report	Teerasil 15'; Alhaft 42'	Stadium: Jalan Besar Stadium; Attendance: 1,350; Referee: Wang Di (China)
Note: Bangkok United won 4–3 on aggregate.

=== AFC Women's Champions League ===
==== Preliminary phase ====
===== Lion City Sailors =====
Pos	Team	Pld	W	D	L	GF	GA	GD	Pts	Qualification
1	(Singapore) Lion City Sailors	3	3	0	0	8	1	+7	9	Advance to group stage
2	(Jordan) Etihad	3	2	0	1	7	3	+4	6	
3	(Kyrgyzstan) Sdyushor SI–Asiagoal	3	0	1	2	1	6	−5	1	
4	(Malaysia) Kelana United (H)	3	0	1	2	1	7	−6	1	

Source: AFC
Rules for classification: Tiebreakers
(H) Hosts

25 August 2025 1	Etihad Club (Jordan)	0–2	(Singapore) Lion City Sailors	Melaka, Malaysia
			Ami Takeuchi 10', 39'	Stadium: Hang Jebat Stadium; Attendance: 36; Referee: Mahnaz Zokaee (Iran)

28 August 2025 2	Lion City Sailors (Singapore)	3–1	(Malaysia) Kelana United	Melaka, Malaysia
	Miyu Inayama 11'; Nur Ain Salleh 62'; Ami Takeuchi 69'		Viny Silfianus 90+1'	Stadium: Hang Jebat Stadium; Attendance: 115; Referee: Yang Shu-ting (Chinese Taipei)

31 August 2025 3	Lion City Sailors (Singapore)	3–0	(Kyrgyzstan) Sdyushor SI - Asiagoal	Melaka, Malaysia
	Ami Takeuchi 10'; Miyu Inayama 35'; Sarah Zu’risqha Zul’kepli 63'			Stadium: Hang Jebat Stadium; Referee: Alesar Baddour (Syria)

==== Group phase ====
===== Lion City Sailors =====
Pos	Team	Pld	W	D	L	GF	GA	GD	Pts	Qualification
1	(Australia) Melbourne City	3	3	0	0	15	0	+15	9	Advance to knockout stage
2	(Vietnam) Hồ Chí Minh City (H)	3	2	0	1	3	3	0	6	Advance to knockout stage
3	(Philippines) Stallion Laguna	3	1	0	2	5	8	−3	3	Advance to knockout stage
4	(Singapore) Lion City Sailors	3	0	0	3	0	12	−12	0	

Source: AFC
Rules for classification: Tiebreakers
(H) Hosts

13 November 2025 1	Lion City Sailors (Singapore)	0–5	(Australia) Melbourne City	Ho Chi Minh City, Vietnam
		Report	Holly McNamara 11' (pen.), 45+1' (pen.); Alexia Apostolakis 55'; Danella Butrus 58'; Caitlin Karic 73'	Stadium: Thong Nhat Stadium; Attendance: 512; Referee: Oh Hyeon-jeong (South Korea)

16 November 2025 2	Lion City Sailors (Singapore)	0–2	(Vietnam) Hồ Chí Minh City	Ho Chi Minh City, Vietnam
		Report	Trần Nguyễn Bảo Châu 83'; K'Thủa 90+3'	Stadium: Thong Nhat Stadium; Attendance: 925; Referee: Dong Fangyu (China)

19 November 2025 3	Lion City Sailors (Singapore)	0–5	(Philippines) Stallion Laguna	Ho Chi Minh City, Vietnam
		Report	Halle Johnson 22'; Chandler McDaniel 42', 90'; Tayla Christensen 75', 84'	Stadium: Thong Nhat Stadium; Referee: Veronika Bernatskaia (Kyrgyzstan)

== Regional competitions ==
=== ASEAN Club Championship ===
==== Group phase ====
===== Lion City Sailors =====
Pos	Team	Pld	W	D	L	GF	GA	GD	Pts	Qualification
1	(Vietnam) Nam Định	5	4	1	0	13	3	+10	13	Advance to knockout stage
2	(Malaysia) Johor Darul Ta'zim	5	3	2	0	13	4	+9	11	Advance to knockout stage
3	(Cambodia) Preah Khan Reach Svay Rieng	5	2	2	1	9	5	+4	8	
4	(Thailand) Bangkok United	5	1	2	2	6	12	−6	5	
5	(Singapore) Lion City Sailors	5	1	1	3	6	12	−6	4	
6	(Myanmar) Shan United	5	0	0	5	3	14	−11	0	

Source: ASEAN United FC
Rules for classification: Tiebreakers

21 August 2025 1	Johor Darul Ta'zim (Malaysia)	3–1	(Singapore) Lion City Sailors	Johor, Malaysia
17:30 UTC+8	Figueiredo 11' (pen.), 16'; Arif 90+3'; Afiq (yellow card) 78'; Bérgson (yellow card) 83'	Report	Shawal 90+5'; Safuwan (yellow card) 8'; Pires (yellow card) 45+3'	Stadium: Sultan Ibrahim Stadium; Attendance: 13,143; Referee: Koji Takasaki (Japan)

4 December 2025 2	Bangkok United (Thailand)	2–2	(Singapore) Lion City Sailors	Pathum Thani, Thailand
19:00 UTC+7	Praisuwan 24'; Kunori 76'	Report	Lestienne 11'; Lopes 20'	Stadium: True BG Stadium; Referee: Meder Tayçiev (Kyrgyzstan)

17 December 2025 3	Lion City Sailors (Singapore)	3–2	(Myanmar) Shan United	Bishan, Singapore
19:30 UTC+8	Thy 23', 68'; Lestienne 45+2'	Report	Souza 28' (pen.); Hirota 66'	Stadium: Bishan Stadium; Attendance: 1,543; Referee: Yusuke Ohashi (Japan)

29 January 2026 4	Nam Định (Vietnam)	3-0	(Singapore) Lion City Sailors	Ninh Bình, Vietnam
19:30 UTC+7	César 35'; Nguyễn 61', 90+3'	Report		Stadium: Thiên Trường Stadium

5 February 2026 5	Lion City Sailors (Singapore)	0-2	(Cambodia) PKR Svay Rieng	Bishan, Singapore
20:30 UTC+8		Report	Patrick 51', 64'	Stadium: Bishan Stadium

===== BG Tampines Rovers =====
Pos	Team	Pld	W	D	L	GF	GA	GD	Pts	Qualification
1	(Thailand) Buriram United	5	2	3	0	14	5	+9	9	Advance to knockout stage
2	(Malaysia) Selangor	5	2	3	0	9	5	+4	9	Advance to knockout stage
3	(Thailand) BG Pathum United	5	2	2	1	9	7	+2	8	
4	(Vietnam) Công An Hà Nội	5	2	1	2	9	6	+3	7	
5	(Singapore) Tampines Rovers	5	2	0	3	10	17	−7	6	
6	(Philippines) Dynamic Herb Cebu	5	0	1	4	2	13	−11	1	

Source: ASEAN United FC
Rules for classification: Tiebreakers

20 August 2025 1	DH Cebu (Philippines)	1–3	(Singapore) BG Tampines Rovers	Manila, Philippines
	Abou Sy 22'; Daniel Gadia (yellow card) 34'	Report	Hide Higashikawa 2'; Dylan Fox 19' (yellow card) 72'; Trent Buhagiar 90+7'; Seiga Sumi (yellow card) 68'	Stadium: Rizal Memorial Stadium; Referee: Wiwat Jumpaoon (Thailand); Man of the Match: (Australia) Dylan Fox

25 September 2025 2	Selangor (Malaysia)	4–2	(Singapore) BG Tampines Rovers	Shah Alam, Malaysia
	Shuya Yamashita 18' (o.g.); Zach Clough 30'; Faisal Halim 51'; Alvin Fortes 58' (yellow card) 90+5'	Report	Koya Kazama 41' (pen.); Hide Higashikawa 65'; Taufik Suparno (yellow card) 80'	Stadium: Shah Alam Stadium; Referee: Omar Al-Yaqoubi (Oman)

3 December 2025 3	BG Tampines Rovers (Singapore)	3–2	(Thailand) BG Pathum United	Jalan Besar, Singapore
	Hide Higashikawa 45+3', 61', 78'; Shah Shairan (penalty missed) 11; Irfan Najeeb (yellow card) 30'	Report	Tomoyuki Doi 7'; Raniel 27'; Sarach Yooyen (yellow card) 66'; Ekanit Panya (yellow card) 77'	Stadium: Jalan Besar Stadium; Referee: Ahmed Al-Ali (Jordan)

28 January 2026 4	BG Tampines Rovers (Singapore)	1–4	(Thailand) Buriram United	Bishan, Singapore
	Taufik Suparno 90+1'; Trent Buhagiar (yellow card) 83'	Report	Suphanat Mueanta 32'; Guilherme Bissoli 52', 70' (pen.); Goran Čaušić 88'	Stadium: Bishan Stadium; Referee: Koji Takasaki (Japan)

4 February 2026 5	Cong An Hanoi FC (Vietnam)	6–1	(Singapore) BG Tampines Rovers	Hanoi, Vietnam
	Hugo Gomes 15'; Lê Văn Đô 28'; Phan Văn Đức 32'; Vitão 75'; Alan Grafite 83'	Report	Trent Buhagiar 12'	Stadium: Hàng Đẫy Stadium; Referee: Chae Sang-hyeop (South Korea)

== League competitions (Men's) ==
League Division	Promoted to league ▲	Relegated from league ▼
SFL Div One	Tengah FC ▲; Jungfrau Punggol FC ▲	Tiong Bahru FC ▼; South Avenue SC ▼
SFL Div Two	GDT Circuit ▲; Westwood El'Junior ▲	Bedok South Avenue SC ▼; Eunos Crescent FC ▼

=== Singapore Premier League ===
Pos	Team	Pld	W	D	L	GF	GA	GD	Pts	Qualification or relegation
1	Lion City Sailors (C)	21	16	3	2	70	14	+56	51	Qualification for the AFC Champions League Two (Note: As league champions Lion City Sailors also won the 2025–26 Singapore Cup, the continental place allocated to the cup winners passed to league runners-up BG Tampines Rovers.)
2	BG Tampines Rovers	21	15	4	2	58	21	+37	49	Qualification for the AFC Champions League Two
3	Albirex Niigata (S)	21	15	2	4	47	19	+28	47	
4	Balestier Khalsa	21	11	2	8	44	46	−2	35	
5	Geylang International	21	7	3	11	29	42	−13	24	
6	Hougang United	21	7	0	14	24	41	−17	21	
7	Young Lions (Note: Young Lions were not eligible to qualify for AFC club competitions.)	21	2	3	16	15	58	−43	9	
8	Tanjong Pagar United	21	2	1	18	17	63	−46	7	

Source: Singapore Premier League
Rules for classification: 1) Points; 2) goal difference; 3) goals scored; 4) wins
(C) Champions

=== Singapore Premier League 2 ===
Pos	Team	Pld	W	D	L	GF	GA	GD	Pts	Qualification or relegation
1	Albirex Niigata (S) II	21	14	1	6	50	23	+27	43	Inaugural Champion
2	Young Lions B	21	13	1	7	52	31	+21	40	
3	BG Tampines Rovers II	21	12	2	7	46	30	+16	38	
4	Geylang International II	21	9	4	8	36	38	−2	31	
5	Tanjong Pagar United II	21	9	3	9	34	43	−9	30	
6	Lion City Sailors II	21	7	2	12	35	41	−6	23	
7	Hougang United II	21	5	4	12	28	43	−15	19	
8	Balestier Khalsa II	21	5	3	13	25	57	−32	18	

First match(es) will be played: 7 May 2026. Source: Singapore Premier League
Rules for classification: 1) points; 2) goal difference; 3) number of goals scored; 4) number of wins

=== Singapore Football League One ===
Pos	Team	Pld	W	D	L	GF	GA	GD	Pts
1	Singapore Cricket Club	14	10	2	2	32	10	+22	32
2	Jungfrau Punggol FC	14	10	2	2	34	21	+13	32
3	Police SA	14	8	4	2	28	14	+14	28
4	Singapore Khalsa Association	14	8	1	5	29	20	+9	25
5	Project Vaults Oxley SC	14	4	0	10	20	38	−18	12
6	Tengah FC	14	3	2	9	24	38	−14	11
7	Katong FC (R)	14	2	5	7	21	35	−14	11
8	Yishun Sentek Mariners (R)	14	2	2	10	21	33	−12	8

Source: Football Association of Singapore
Rules for classification: 1) points; 2) goal difference; 3) number of goals scored; 4) number of wins
(R) Relegated

=== Singapore Football League Two ===
Pos	Team	Pld	W	D	L	GF	GA	GD	Pts
1	Bishan Barx FC (C)	18	14	3	1	55	13	+42	45
2	South Avenue SC (P)	18	14	2	2	49	11	+38	44
3	Warwick Knights FC	18	13	2	3	56	23	+33	41
4	GDT Circuit FC	18	9	2	7	41	39	+2	29
5	Starlight Soccerites FC	18	9	2	7	36	39	−3	29
6	Admiralty CSN	18	6	3	9	31	43	−12	21
7	Kaki Bukit SC	18	4	4	10	28	34	−6	16
8	GFA Victoria FC	18	4	3	11	24	53	−29	15
9	Westwood El'Junior FC	18	2	4	12	19	36	−17	10
10	Tiong Bahru FC (R)	18	1	3	14	25	73	−48	6

Source: Football Association of Singapore
Rules for classification: 1) points; 2) goal difference; 3) number of goals scored; 4) number of wins
(C) Champions; (P) Promoted; (R) Relegated

=== Island Wide League ===
Final

30 Aug 2025 Final	Tanah Merah United	2-3	Gymkhana	Jurong East Stadium
18:00 UTC+8	Faizal Mohamed 80'; Ahmad Danish 90+'	Report	Bawantha Buddhika 4'; Is Hazwan 4'; Haziq Jantan 122'
Note: Both teams will be promoted to 2026 SFL2 after qualifying for the Final.

== Cup competitions (Men's) ==
=== Singapore Cup ===
==== Final ====
10 January 2026
Final

Lion City Sailors (Singapore)	2–0 (a.e.t.)	(Singapore) BG Tampines Rovers
Syahin 115'; Lopes 120+2'	Report

Jalan Besar Stadium, Kallang
Attendance: 3,767
Referee: Adam Kersey (Australia)

=== Singapore FA Cup ===
==== Final ====
9 Nov 2025
19:30 UTC+8
M39

Police SA	1-2	Warwick Knights
Goal	Report	Amirul Walid 90+6'

Bedok Stadium

== League competitions (Women's) ==
=== Women's Premier League ===
Pos	Team	Pld	W	D	L	GF	GA	GD	Pts	Qualification or relegation
1	Albirex Niigata (S) (C)	16	15	0	1	91	6	+85	45	Qualification for AFC Champions League
2	Still Aerion	16	12	2	2	57	21	+36	38	
3	Lion City Sailors	16	11	3	2	76	10	+66	36	
4	Geylang International	16	9	2	5	40	23	+17	29	
5	Hougang United	16	6	2	8	17	28	−11	20	
6	Tanjong Pagar United	16	4	0	12	11	43	−32	12	
7	Tiong Bahru	16	4	0	12	13	47	−34	12	
8	BG Tampines Rovers	16	3	2	11	17	57	−40	11	
9	Balestier Khalsa	16	2	1	13	11	98	−87	7	

Updated to match(es) played on 12 Oct 2025. Source: Women's Premier League
Rules for classification: 1) points; 2) goal difference; 3) number of goals scored; 4) number of wins
(C) League champions

=== Women's National League ===
Pos	Team	Pld	W	D	L	GF	GA	GD	Pts
1	Mattar Sailors FC (C)	12	10	1	1	51	8	+43	31
2	Jungfrau Punggol FC	12	9	1	2	35	13	+22	28
3	Eastern Thunder FC	12	8	1	3	34	9	+25	25
4	Unity FC	12	7	1	4	42	16	+26	22
5	Kaki Bukit SC	12	2	1	9	21	49	−28	7
6	Royal Arion Women's FC	12	2	0	10	14	31	−17	6
7	GDT Circuit FC	12	1	1	10	5	76	−71	4

Source: FAS
Rules for classification: 1) points; 2) goal difference; 3) number of goals scored; 4) number of wins
(C) Champions

== Managerial changes ==
Team	Outgoing manager	Manner of departure	Date of departure	Position in table	Incoming manager	Date of appointment
Tanjong Pagar United	(Singapore) Noh Alam Shah (interim)	Appointed to permanent role				1 July 2025
Hougang United	(Nigeria) Robert Eziakor (interim)	Appointed to permanent role				1 July 2025
Balestier Khalsa	(Netherlands) Peter de Roo	End of contract	31 May 2025	Pre-season	(Croatia) Marko Kraljević	30 June 2025
BG Tampines Rovers	(Singapore) Gavin Lee	Mutual consent	17 June 2025	Pre-season	(Singapore) Akbar Nawas	20 June 2025
Young Lions	(Singapore) Fadzuhasny Juraimi	End of interim	25 June 2025	Pre-season	(Singapore) Firdaus Kassim	25 June 2025
Singapore men's national team	(Japan) Tsutomu Ogura	Mutual consent	24 June 2025	-	(Singapore) Gavin Lee (interim)	24 June 2025
BG Tampines Rovers	(Singapore) Akbar Nawas (Note: Akbar was subsequently announced as the TD of Hougang United on 22 Sept.)	Mutual consent	11 September 2025	4th	(Singapore) Noh Rahman (interim)	11 September 2025
Hougang United	(Nigeria) Robert Eziakor (Note: Eziakor was subsequently announced as the U-19 head coach of Tampines Rovers in January 2026.)	Mutual consent	27 October 2025	6th	(Thailand) Pannarai Pansiri (interim)	27 October 2025
Singapore men's national team	(Singapore) Gavin Lee	Appointed to permanent role				24 June 2025
Singapore U19 women's	(Singapore) Fazrul Nawaz	Mutual consent	11 August 2025	-	(England) Manisha Tailor	12 September 2025
Lion City Sailors	(Serbia) Aleksandar Rankovic	Mutual consent	6 February 2026	1st	(Spain) Varo Moreno (interim)	14 February 2026
BG Tampines Rovers	(Singapore) Noh Rahman	Mutual consent	14 February 2026	2nd	(Nigeria) Robert Eziakor (interim)	14 February 2026
Lion City Sailors	(Spain) Varo Moreno	End of interim	23 February 2026	1st	(Spain) Jesús Casas	23 February 2026
BG Tampines Rovers	(Nigeria) Robert Eziakor	End of interim	4 April 2026	2nd	(Japan) Katsuhito Kinoshi	4 April 2026
BG Tampines Rovers	(Japan) Katsuhito Kinoshi	Resigns (Note: Kinoshi has stepped down from his role as Head Coach with immediate effect due to family reasons.)	15 April 2026	2nd	William Phang (Note: Phang was also Tampines Rovers's general manager and goalkeeper coach.) (interim)	15 April 2026

== Deaths ==
2025

- 7 February 2025: (England) Mick Walker (84), English footballer, manager (Singapore, Burton Albion, Notts County), and scout (Leeds United).
- 18 October 2025: (Singapore) Kelvin Yap Jun Liang (19), Singaporean footballer (Tanjong Pagar United U21, Balestier Khalsa U15/U17).
- 23 December 2025: Darimosuvito Tokijan (62), Singaporean footballer (Singapore FA, Jurong Town, Singapore), assistant manager (Tanjong Pagar United, Balestier Khalsa), and manager (Geylang United).

== Retirements ==
2025

- 2 February 2025: Fashah Iskandar, 29, former Singapore, Young Lions, Warriors FC and Tanjong Pagar United goalkeeper.
- 23 May 2025: Yasir Hanapi, 35, former Singapore, Geylang International, LionsXII, Home United, PDRM and Tampines Rovers midfielder.
- 20 August 2025: (Japan) Yohei Otake, 36, former FC Tokyo, Cerezo Osaka, Shonan Bellmare, Fagiano Okayama, V-Varen Nagasaki and Albirex Niigata (S) midfielder.

2026

- 1 February 2026: Emmeric Ong, 35, former Singapore, Hougang United, Young Lions, Warriors FC, Balestier Khalsa and Tanjong Pagar United defender.
- 9 May 2026: (Japan) Shuhei Hoshino, 30, former Albirex Niigata (S), Busan Transportation Corporation, Balestier Khalsa, Geylang International defender and striker.
