= 2025 Albirex Niigata (S) Women season =

Albirex Niigata (S)
2025 season
- Chairman: Daisuke Korenaga
- Head coach: (Japan) Kana Kitahara
- Premier League: 1st
- Top goalscorer: Ruriko Takashima (30 goals)

The 2025 season was Albirex Niigata (S) Women's fourth consecutive season in the top flight of Singapore football, the Women's Premier League.

== Squad ==
=== Women squad ===
As of 5 February 2022

| Squad No. | Name | Nationality | Date of birth (age) | Previous club | Contract start | Contract end |
Goalkeepers
| 1 | Aaliya Rosman | (Singapore) | 19 January 2008 (age 18) | (Singapore) Mattar Sailors (W) | 2025 | 2025 |
| 17 | Ng Meizhi | (Singapore) | 10 September 1994 (age 31) | (China) Shanghai Women's International Football Club (SWIFC) | 2025 | 2025 |
| 23 | Erlinawaty Jaffar | (Singapore) | 10 November 1985 (age 40) | (Singapore) Hougang United (W) | 2025 | 2025 |
Defenders
| 4 | Sun Jie | (Singapore) (China) | 31 July 1985 (age 40) | (Singapore) | 2023 | 2025 |
| 6 | Nur Dawisyah Noor Haidi | (Singapore) | 22 July 2001 (age 24) | (Singapore) JSSL Tampines | 2024 | 2025 |
| 21 | El'rina Alisha | (Singapore) | 21 August 2010 (age 15) | Youth Team | 2025 | 2025 |
| 27 | Izyani Ghani | (Singapore) | 22 October 1987 (age 38) | (Singapore) Hougang United (W) | 2025 | 2025 |
| 84 | Munirah Mohamad | (Singapore) | 13 February 1997 (age 29) | (Singapore) Lion City Sailors (W) | 2025 | 2025 |
| 99 | Rosnani Azman | (Singapore) | 22 May 1997 (age 29) | (Singapore) Hougang United (W) | 2024 | 2025 |
Midfielders
| 7 | Ariqah Erwan | (Singapore) | 25 April 2005 (age 21) | (Singapore) BG Tampines Rovers (W) | 2025 | 2025 |
| 8 | Sitianiwati Rosielin | (Singapore) | 26 May 1987 (age 39) | (Singapore) Hougang United (W) | 2025 | 2025 |
| 10 | Nurzaherra Maisarah | (Singapore) | 21 October 2006 (age 19) | (Singapore) Police SA (W) | 2024 | 2025 |
| 11 | Alwydia Putri | (Singapore) | 26 October 2004 (age 21) | (Singapore) Tiong Bahru FC | 2025 | 2025 |
| 14 | Kana Kitahara | (Japan) | 7 December 1988 (age 37) | (Japan) MyNavi Sendai | 2022 | 2025 |
| 20 | Verona Lim Ruo Ya | (Singapore) | 20 January 2010 (age 16) | (Singapore) Mattar Sailors (W) | 2025 | 2025 |
| 22 | Vanessa Han | (China) | 25 August 2009 (age 16) | (Singapore) BG Tampines Rovers (W) | 2025 | 2025 |
| 25 | Siti Wan Nabilah | (Singapore) | 15 May 1993 (age 33) | (Singapore) Hougang United (W) | 2025 | 2025 |
| 29 | Asyura Abdullah | (China) | 8 April 2008 (age 18) | (Singapore) BG Tampines Rovers (W) | 2025 | 2025 |
Strikers
| 9 | Manami Fukuzawa | (Japan) | 2 May 1991 (age 35) | (Singapore) Tanjong Pagar United (W) | 2024 | 2025 |
| 18 | Ruriko Takashima | (Japan) | 8 May 1990 (age 36) | (Japan) Asahi Intecc Loveledge Nagoya | 2025 | 2025 |
Players who left club during season
| 15 | Janet Tan | (Singapore) | 6 November 2007 (age 18) | (Singapore) Turf City FC | 2024 | 2025 |

== Coaching staff ==
First Team

| Position | Name |
|---|---|
| Technical Director | (Japan) Kazuaki Yoshinaga |
| Team Manager (Men) | (Singapore) Dominic Wong |
| Team Manager (Women) | |
| Head Coach (Men) | (Japan) Kazuaki Yoshinaga |
| Head Coach (Women) | (Japan) Kana Kitahara |
| Assistant Coach (Men) | (Japan) Keiji Shigetomi (Singapore) Jaswinder Singh |
| Assistant Coach (Women) | (Singapore) Nas Nastain (Japan) Yuki Monden |
| Goalkeeper Coach (Men) | (Singapore) Fadhil Salim |
| Goalkeeper Coach (Women) | (Singapore) Bryan Quek |
| Fitness Coach (Men) | (Japan) Masayuki Kato |
| Fitness Coach (Women) | |
| Sports Trainer | (Singapore) Kyler Wong Yiming |
| Physiotherapist | (Singapore) Karen Koh (Singapore) Alison Soh |
| Kitman | (Singapore) Roy Krishnan (Singapore) Muhammad Taufik |
| Interpreter | (Japan) Masayuki Kato |

Academy

| Position | Name |
|---|---|
| Head of Youth | (Spain) Marcal Trulls |
| Under-21 Head Coach | (Singapore) Jaswinder Singh |
| Under-17 Head Coach | (Spain) Marcal Trulls |
| Under-15 Head Coach | (Japan) Masayuki Kato |
| Under-21 Asst Coach | (Singapore) Nas |
| Under-17 Asst Coach | (Japan) Keiji Shigetomi |
| Under-15 Asst Coach | (Singapore) Tyrus Soo (Singapore) Nurhalis Azmi |
| Goalkeeper Coach (Under-21) | (Singapore) Fadhil Salim |
| Goalkeeper Coach (Under-17 & Under-15) | (Singapore) Hyrulnizam Juma'at |
| Under-21 Fitness Coach | (Singapore) Sufian |
| Under-21 Trainer | (Singapore) Xin Yu |

== Transfer ==
=== In ===
Preseason

| Position | Player | Transferred from | Team | Ref |
|---|---|---|---|---|
| GK | (Singapore) Ng Meizhi | (China) Shanghai Women's International Football Club | Women | Free |
| GK | (Singapore) Aaliya Rosman | (Singapore) Mattar Sailors | Women | Free |
| GK | (Singapore) Erlinawaty Jaffar | Free Agent | Women | Free |
| DF | (Singapore) El'rina Alisha | Youth Academy | Women | Free |
| DF | (Singapore) Munirah Mohamad | Free Agent | Women | Free |
| DF | (Singapore) Izyani Ghani | (Singapore) Hougang United | Women | Free |
| MF | (Singapore) Sitianiwati Rosielin | (Singapore) Hougang United | Women | Free |
| MF | (Singapore) Siti Wan Nabilah | (Singapore) Hougang United | Women | Free |
| MF | (Singapore) Alwydia Putri | (Singapore) BG Tampines Rovers | Women | Free |
| MF | (China) Vanessa Han | (Singapore) BG Tampines Rovers | Women | Free |
| MF | (Singapore) Ariqah Erwan | (Singapore) BG Tampines Rovers | Women | Free |
| FW | (Japan) Ruriko Takashima | (Japan) Asahi Intecc Loveledge Nagoya | Women | Free |

Note 1:

Mid-season

| Position | Player | Transferred from | Team | Ref |
|---|---|---|---|---|
| GK | (Singapore) Eng Chiu | (Singapore) Balestier Khalsa (W) | Women | Free |

=== Loan in ===
Preseason

| Position | Player | Transferred from | Team | Ref |

=== Loan return ===
Preseason

| Position | Player | Transferred To / From | Ref |

=== Out ===
Preseason

| Position | Player | Transferred To | Team | Ref |
|---|---|---|---|---|
| GK | (Singapore) Nurul Haziqah | (Singapore) Lion City Sailors | Women | Free |
| GK | (Singapore) Lutfiah Hannah | (Singapore) | Women | Free |
| GK | (Singapore) Eng Chiu | (Singapore) | Women | Free |
| DF | (Singapore) Nabilla Aina | (Singapore) | Women | Free |
| DF | (Singapore) Dini Danisha | (Singapore) | Women | Free |
| DF | (Malaysia) Rebecca Harding | (Singapore) | Women | Free |
| MF | (Singapore) Joan Mulan Ayliffe | (Serbia) Red Star Belgrade | Women | Free |
| MF | (Singapore) Noralinda Wahab | (Singapore) | Women | Free |
| MF | (Singapore) Dhaniyah Qasimah | (Singapore) Lion City Sailors (W) | Women | Free |
| MF | (Singapore) Nurul Unaisah | (Singapore) Still Aerion WFC | Women | Free |
| MF | (Singapore) Ernie Sulastri Sontaril | (Singapore) Still Aerion WFC | Women | Free |
| MF | (Singapore) Afiqah Omar | (Singapore) Still Aerion WFC | Women | Free |
| FW | (Singapore) Nur Izzati Rosni | (Singapore) Still Aerion WFC | Women | Free |
| FW | (Singapore) (France) Lila Tan Hui Ying | (Singapore) Still Aerion WFC | Women | Free |
| FW | (Japan) Yuki Monden | Retired | Women | Free |
| FW | (Singapore) Huraizah Ismail | (Singapore) | Women | Free |

Mid-season

| Position | Player | Transferred To | Team | Ref |
|---|---|---|---|---|
| DF | (Singapore) Verona Lim Ruo Ya | (United States) IMG Academy | First Team | Scholarship till 2028 |
| MF | (Singapore) Janet Tan | (Singapore) Still Aerion WFC | Women | Free |

=== Loan out ===
| Position | Player | Transferred To | Team | Ref |
|---|---|---|---|---|
| DF | (Singapore) Irsalina Irwan | (United States) IMG Academy | First Team | Season loan |

=== Extended ===
| Position | Player | Ref |
|---|---|---|
| DF | (Singapore) Rosnani Azman | |
| DF | (Singapore) (China) Sun Jie | |
| MF | (Singapore) Nur Dawisyah Noor Haidi | |
| MF | (Singapore) Janet Tan | |
| MF | (Singapore) Nurzaherra Maisarah | |
| MF | (Japan) Kana Kitahara | |
| FW | (Japan) Manami Fukuzawa | |
| GK | (Singapore) Maisarah Ramat | |
| DF | (Singapore) Dini Danisha | |
| MF | (Singapore) Noralinda Wahab | |
| MF | (Singapore) Huraizah Ismail | |
| FW | (Singapore) Nurul Unaisah | |

== Friendly ==
=== Pre-season ===
Win Draw Loss

== Team statistics ==
=== Appearances and goals (Women) ===
As of 17 May 25

| No. | Pos. | Player | WPL | | Total | |
| No. | Pos. | Player | Apps. | Goals | Apps. | Goals |
|---|---|---|---|---|---|---|
| 1 | GK | (Singapore) Aaliya Rosman | 0 | 0 | 0 | 0 |
| 4 | DF | (Singapore) (China) Sun Jie | 5 | 0 | 5 | 0 |
| 6 | DF | (Singapore) Nur Dawisyah Noor Haidi | 2 | 0 | 2 | 0 |
| 7 | MF | (Singapore) Ariqah Erwan | 0 | 0 | 0 | 0 |
| 8 | MF | (Singapore) Sitianiwati Rosielin | 4+1 | 0 | 5 | 0 |
| 9 | FW | (Japan) Manami Fukuzawa | 5 | 3 | 5 | 3 |
| 10 | MF | (Singapore) Nurzaherra Maisarah | 5 | 1 | 5 | 1 |
| 11 | MF | (Singapore) Alwydia Putri | 0 | 0 | 0 | 0 |
| 14 | MF | (Singapore) Kana Kitahara | 5 | 4 | 5 | 4 |
| 15 | MF | (Singapore) Janet Tan | 1 | 0 | 1 | 0 |
| 17 | GK | (Singapore) Ng Meizhi | 0 | 0 | 0 | 0 |
| 18 | FW | (Japan) Ruriko Takashima | 5 | 8 | 5 | 8 |
| 20 | MF | (Singapore) Verona Lim Ruo Ya | 0+1 | 0 | 1 | 0 |
| 21 | DF | (Singapore) El'rina Alisha | 0 | 0 | 0 | 0 |
| 22 | MF | (Singapore) Vanessa Han | 5 | 1 | 5 | 1 |
| 23 | GK | (Singapore) Erlinawaty Jaffar | 5 | 0 | 5 | 0 |
| 25 | MF | (Singapore) Siti Wan Nabilah | 5 | 1 | 5 | 1 |
| 27 | DF | (Singapore) Izyani Ghani | 3+1 | 1 | 4 | 1 |
| 84 | DF | (Singapore) Munirah Mohamad | 0 | 0 | 0 | 0 |
| 99 | DF | (Singapore) Rosnani Azman | 5 | 0 | 5 | 0 |

== Competitions ==
2025 Women's Premier League is:

=== Women's Premier League ===
Win Draw Loss

| 8 March 2025 1 | Albirex Niigata (S) (Singapore) | 1–2 | (Singapore) Lion City Sailors | Choa Chu Kang |
| | Ruriko Takashima 29' | Report | Raeka Ee Pei Ying 39'; Nor Adriana Lim 83' | Stadium: Choa Chu Kang Stadium |

| 23 March 2025 2 | Geylang International (Singapore) | 1–3 | (Singapore) Albirex Niigata (S) | Choa Chu Kang |
| | Farah Nurzahirah 26' | Report | Manami Fukuzawa 24'; Vanessa Han 31'; Nurzaherra Maisarah 53' | Stadium: Choa Chu Kang Stadium |

| 12 April 2025 3 | Tanjong Pagar United (Singapore) | 0–7 | (Singapore) Albirex Niigata (S) | Choa Chu Kang |
| | | Report | Manami Fukuzawa 11'; Ruriko Takashima 15' 49'; Kana Kitahara 40' 57' 71'; Siti Wan Nabila 46' | Stadium: Choa Chu Kang Stadium |

| 13 August 2025 4 (Rescheduled) | Albirex Niigata (S) (Singapore) | 7–0 | (Singapore) BG Tampines Rovers | Jalan Besar |
| | Sitianiwati Rosielin 4'; Manami Fukuzawa 30'; Kana Kitahara 43' 44' 51'; Siti Wan Nabilah 74'; Rosnani Azman 89' | | | Stadium: Jalan Besar Stadium |

| 24 September 2025 5 (Rescheduled) | Hougang United (Singapore) | 0–4 | (Singapore) Albirex Niigata (S) | Choa Chu Kang |
| | | | Ruriko Takashima 10', 30'; 27' (pen.); Manami Fukuzawa 64' | Stadium: Choa Chu Kang Stadium |

| 10 September 2025 6 (Rescheduled) | Albirex Niigata (S) (Singapore) | 13–0 | (Singapore) Balestier Khalsa | Choa Chu Kang |
| | Rosnani Azman 11'; Kana Kitahara 28', 32', 73', 90'; Ruriko Takashima 53', 79', 81', 89'; Sitianiwati Rosielin 69', 86'; Manami Fukuzawa 72'; Siti Wan Nabila 89' | | | Stadium: Choa Chu Kang Stadium |

| 10 May 2025 7 | Albirex Niigata (S) (Singapore) | 7–2 | (Singapore) Still Aerion WFC | Choa Chu Kang |
| | Ruriko Takashima 4' 16' 41' 46'; Manami Fukuzawa 11'; Kana Kitahara 22'; Izyani Ghani 79' | | Nurul Unaisah 40', 88' | Stadium: Choa Chu Kang Stadium |

| 18 May 2025 8 | Lion City Sailors (Singapore) | 0–1 | (Singapore) Albirex Niigata (S) | Choa Chu Kang |
| | | | Ruriko Takashima 4' | Stadium: Choa Chu Kang Stadium |

| 25 May 2025 9 | Albirex Niigata (S) (Singapore) | 1–0 | (Singapore) Geylang International | Choa Chu Kang |
| | Kana Kitahara | | | Stadium: Choa Chu Kang Stadium |

| 17 August 2025 10 | BG Tampines Rovers (Singapore) | 0–7 | (Singapore) Albirex Niigata (S) | Choa Chu Kang |
| | | | Manami Fukuzawa 29', 30', 50'; Kana Kitahara 11', 15'; Ruriko Takashima 38', 47' | Stadium: Choa Chu Kang Stadium |

| 31 August 2025 11 (Rescheduled) | Tiong Bahru FC (Singapore) | 0–9 | (Singapore) Albirex Niigata (S) | Choa Chu Kang |
| | | | Kana Kitahara 5', 57'; Ruriko Takashima 10', 52', 61', 65'; Siti Wan Nabila 29'; Manami Fukuzawa 54'; Nurzaherra Maisarah 79' | Stadium: Choa Chu Kang Stadium |

| 24 August 2025 12 (Rescheduled) | Albirex Niigata (S) (Singapore) | 7–0 | (Singapore) Tiong Bahru FC | Choa Chu Kang |
| | Kana Kitahara 2'; Nurzaherra Maisarah 6'; Manami Fukuzawa 27', 39'; Ruriko Takashima 35', 44', 45' | | | Stadium: Choa Chu Kang Stadium |

| 6 September 2025 13 | Albirex Niigata (S) (Singapore) | 5–0 | (Singapore) Tanjong Pagar United | Choa Chu Kang |
| | Ruriko Takashima 4'; Kana Kitahara 6'; Manami Fukuzawa 11'; Siti Wan Nabila 26'; Nurzaherra Maisarah 59' | | | Stadium: Choa Chu Kang Stadium |

| 13 September 2025 14 | Albirex Niigata (S) (Singapore) | 4–0 | (Singapore) Hougang United | Choa Chu Kang |
| | Kana Kitahara 56'; Ruriko Takashima 66'; Siti Wan Nabila 70'; Manami Fukuzawa 86' | | | Stadium: Choa Chu Kang Stadium |

| 27 September 2025 15 | Balestier Khalsa (Singapore) | 1–10 | (Singapore) Albirex Niigata (S) | Choa Chu Kang |
| | | | Sitianiwati Rosielin 12', 27'; Siti Wan Nabila 34', 70'; Kana Kitahara 43'; Manami Fukuzawa 50', 90+1'; Ruriko Takashima 59', 62', 69' | Stadium: Choa Chu Kang Stadium |

| 5 October 2025 16 | Still Aerion WFC (Singapore) | 0–5 | (Singapore) Albirex Niigata (S) | Choa Chu Kang |
| | | | Izyani Ghani 18'; Sitianiwati Rosielin 31'; Kana Kitahara 43'; Ruriko Takashima 57', 59' | Stadium: Choa Chu Kang Stadium |

League table

| Pos | Team | Pld | W | D | L | GF | GA | GD | Pts | Qualification or relegation |
|---|---|---|---|---|---|---|---|---|---|---|
| 1 | Albirex Niigata (S) (C) | 16 | 15 | 0 | 1 | 91 | 6 | +85 | 45 | Qualification for AFC Champions League |
| 2 | Still Aerion | 16 | 12 | 2 | 2 | 57 | 21 | +36 | 38 | |
| 3 | Lion City Sailors | 16 | 11 | 3 | 2 | 76 | 10 | +66 | 36 | |
| 4 | Geylang International | 16 | 9 | 2 | 5 | 40 | 23 | +17 | 29 | |
| 5 | Hougang United | 16 | 6 | 2 | 8 | 17 | 28 | −11 | 20 | |
| 6 | Tanjong Pagar United | 16 | 4 | 0 | 12 | 11 | 43 | −32 | 12 | |
| 7 | Tiong Bahru | 16 | 4 | 0 | 12 | 13 | 47 | −34 | 12 | |
| 8 | BG Tampines Rovers | 16 | 3 | 2 | 11 | 17 | 57 | −40 | 11 | |
| 9 | Balestier Khalsa | 16 | 2 | 1 | 13 | 11 | 98 | −87 | 7 | |

Updated to match(es) played on 12 Oct 2025. Source: Women's Premier League
Rules for classification: 1) points; 2) goal difference; 3) number of goals scored; 4) number of wins
(C) League champions
