= 2025 Aerion Women's FC season =

Aerion WFC
2025 season
- Chairman: Simon Tan
- Head Coach: Jeremy Chiang (Still Aerion)
- Premier League: 2nd
- National League: 6th (Royal Arion)
- Top goalscorer: Sunisa S. (16 goals)

The 2025 season will mark Still Aerion Women's Football Club's 16th season playing in the top flight of Singapore's women football, Women's Premier League.

Royal Arion WFC will be playing in the Women's National League.

During the season, Still Aerion WFC reached its 20th anniversary of participation in women's football.

== Squad ==
=== Still Aerion WFC ===
Note: Still Arion did not release their roster for 2025 season.

Squad No.	Name	Nationality	Date of birth (age)	Previous club	Contract since	Contract end
Goalkeeper
1	Yi Jun	(Singapore)		(Singapore)	2025	2025
12	Lutfiah Hannah	(Singapore)	6 February 2001 (age 25)	(Singapore) Albirex Niigata (S)	2025	2025
18	Pamela Kong Zi En	(Singapore)	5 August 1991 (age 35)	(Singapore)	2022	2025
Defender
4	Jasmine Kua	(Singapore)		(Singapore) Hougang United	2023	2025
5	Janet Tan	(Singapore)	6 November 2007 (age 18)	(Singapore) Albirex Niigata (S)	2025	2025
6	Fonda Chai (C)	(Singapore)		(Singapore)	2017	2025
11	Sunisa Srangthaisong	(Thailand)	6 May 1988 (age 38)	(Singapore) Royal Arion	2024	2025
21	Miska				2025	2025
54	Dini Danisha	(Singapore)	6 April 2003 (age 23)	(Singapore) Albirex Niigata (S)	2025	2025
Midfielder
2	Ella				2025	2025
16	Huraizah Ismail	(Singapore)	2 June 1984 (age 42)	(Singapore) Albirex Niigata (S)	2025	2025
20	Bhanu Krishnasamy	(Singapore)	28 August 1995 (age 31)	(Singapore) Royal Arion	2024	2025
22	Ayla Chin	(Singapore)		(Singapore) Royal Arion/NDC	2025	2025
23	Nur Afiqah Omar	(Singapore)	15 October 2001 (age 24)	(Singapore) Albirex Niigata (S)	2025	2025
Forwards
3	Lila Tan Hui Ying	(Singapore) (France)	4 June 2003 (age 23)	(Singapore) Albirex Niigata (S)	2025	2025
7	Andrea Moska	(Mexico)	(age 34)	(Singapore) BG Tampines Rovers	2025	2025
8	Yon Yoeurn	(Cambodia)	9 July 2000 (age 26)	(Cambodia) Nagaworld FC	2025	2025
9	Thanaporn Yimlamai	(Thailand)		(Thailand) Phranakorn FC Women	2025	2025
10	Jaruwan Chaiyarak	(Thailand)	23 April 1990 (age 36)	(Thailand)	2025	2025
19	Nurul Unaisah	(Singapore)	12 July 2003 (age 23)	(Singapore) Albirex Niigata (S)	2025	2025
24	Noralinda Wahab	(Singapore)	8 March 1994 (age 32)	(Singapore)	2025	2025
77	Nur Azureen Abdul Rahman	(Singapore)	(age 34)	(Singapore) BG Tampines Rovers	2025	2025
Players who left during the season
13	Ernie Sulastri Sontaril	(Singapore)	24 November 1988 (age 37)	(Singapore) Albirex Niigata (S)	2025	2025
8	Nur Izzati Rosni	(Singapore)	24 May 1999 (age 27)	(Singapore) Albirex Niigata (S)	2025	2025
9	Puteri Alisa Wilkinson	(Malaysia)	10 November 1995 (age 30)	(Malaysia) SpiceGals FC	2025	2025
10	Lauren Louise Reese	(Wales)	3 May 1997 (age 29)	(Singapore) Still Aerion	2025	2025

=== Royal Arion WFC ===
Note: Royal Arion did not released their roster for 2025 season.

Squad No.	Name	Nationality	Date of birth (age)	Previous club	Contract since	Contract end

== Coaching staff ==
The following list displays the coaching staff of all the Aerion Women's FC current football sections:

Position	Name
President	Simon Tan
General Manager	
Team Manager (Still Aerion)	
Team Manager (Royal Arion)	
Head Coach (Still Aerion)	(Singapore) Jeremy Chiang
Head Coach (Royal Arion)	(Singapore) Eliss Chen Huixing
Technical Director	(Singapore) Zheng Rong Ming
Goalkeeper Coach	(Singapore) Leon Lee

== Transfers ==
=== In ===
Pre-season

Position	Player	Transferred From
MF	(Wales) Lauren Louise Reese	-
MF	(Singapore) Nurul Unaisah	(Singapore) Albirex Niigata (S)
DF	(Singapore) Ernie Sulastri Sontaril	(Singapore) Albirex Niigata (S)
MF	(Singapore) Afiqah Omar	(Singapore) Albirex Niigata (S)
FW	(Singapore) Nur Izzati Rosni	(Singapore) Albirex Niigata (S)
MF	(Singapore) (France) Lila Tan Hui Ying	(Singapore) Albirex Niigata (S)
GK	(Singapore) Lutfiah Hannah	(Singapore) Albirex Niigata (S)
MF	(Singapore) Huraizah Ismail	(Singapore) Albirex Niigata (S)
FW	(Malaysia) Puteri Alisa Wilkinson	(Malaysia) SpiceGals FC
FW	(Mexico) Andrea Moska	(Singapore) BG Tampines Rovers
FW	(Singapore) Noralinda	
FW	(Singapore) Azureen	
GK	(Singapore) Yi Jun	
	(Singapore) Ella	
	(Singapore) Wani	
	(Singapore) Miska	
	(Singapore) Alya Chin	(Singapore) Royal Arion
FW	(Brazil) Luana Carneiro	(Singapore)

Mid-season

Position	Player	Transferred From
DF	(Singapore) Dini Danisha	-
FW	(Cambodia) Yon Yoeurn	(Cambodia) Nagaworld FC (loan)
FW	(Thailand) Thanaporn Yimlamai	(Thailand) Phranakorn FC
FW	(Thailand) Jaruwan Chaiyarak	-
MF	(Singapore) Janet Tan	(Singapore) Albirex Niigata (S)

=== Out ===
Preseason

Position	Player	Transferred To
DF	(Singapore) Mira Ruzana	(Singapore) Lion City Sailors
FW	(Seychelles) Reena Esther	Not registered due to injury
FW	(England) Carmen Calisto	
FW	(Singapore) Anupriya Subramanian	(Singapore) Tanjong Pagar
DF	(Singapore) Sharon Tan	
DF	(Singapore) Bernice Lim	
FW	(Singapore) Nur Humaira Ibrahim	
FW	(Singapore) Carissa Tan	
GK	(Singapore) Dharshini Sarah	
DF	(Singapore) Tharshini Rajasegar	(Singapore) Mattar Sailors
MF	(Singapore) Rachel Liew	
MF	(Singapore) Nursafura Ali	
FW	(Singapore) Joyce Foo	(Singapore) Mattar Sailors
FW	(Singapore) Monessha Nair	
FW	(Thailand) Uraiporn Yongkul	(Thailand) College of Asian Scholars
FW	(Singapore) Janine Lim	
FW	(Singapore) Saranya Thiru	
FW	(Singapore) Nurhannah Qistina	(Singapore) Mattar Sailors
	(Royal) (Japan) Remi Ogawa	(Singapore) Mattar Sailors
	(Royal) (Singapore) Clara Wong	(Singapore) Mattar Sailors
GK	(Royal) (Singapore) Yeoh Yi Ping	(Singapore) Jungfrau Punggol
	(Royal) (Singapore) Wei Xuan	(Singapore) Jungfrau Punggol
	(Royal) (Singapore) Erica	(Singapore) Jungfrau Punggol
FW	(Royal) (Singapore) Sherlyn Ng	(Singapore) Jungfrau Punggol
	(Royal) (Singapore) Annalisa	(Singapore) Jungfrau Punggol
DF	(Royal) (Singapore) Chloe Lim	(Singapore) Jungfrau Punggol
FW	(Royal) (Singapore) Serena Bok	(Singapore) Jungfrau Punggol
DF	(Royal) (Singapore) Nicole Niam	(Singapore) Jungfrau Punggol

Mid-season

Position	Player	Transferred To
MF	(Singapore) Ernie Sulastri Sontaril	(Malaysia) Selangor FC
FW	(Singapore) Nur Izzati Rosni	(Malaysia) Selangor FC
FW	(Malaysia) Puteri Alisa Wilkinson	(Malaysia) SpiceGals FC
MF	(Wales) Lauren Louise Reese	(Singapore) Geylang International

== Team statistics ==
=== Leading Scorers ===
==== Still Aerion WFC ====
As of 5 Oct 2025

Rank	Player	Goals
1	(Thailand) Sunisa Srangthaisong (Nancy)	16
2	(Cambodia) Yon Yoeurn	8
3	(Singapore) Lila Tan	7
4	(Thailand) Jaruwan Chaiyarak (Kung)	5
5	(Singapore) Nurul Unaisah	4
6	(Singapore) Huraizah Ismail	3
6	(Singapore) Nur Afiqah Omar	3
7	(Malaysia) Puteri Noralisa*	2
7	(Thailand) Thanaporn Yimlamai (Fon)	2
8	(Singapore) Noralinda	1
8	(Singapore) Janet Tan	1
8	(Wales) Lauren Reese*	1

Note: Players marked with an asterisk (*) left the club during mid-season.

== Competition ==
=== Women's Premier League ===
Fixtures and results

Win Draw Loss Postponed

2 Mar 2025 1	Still Aerion	2-2	BG Tampines Rovers	Choa Chu Kang
19:45 (GMT+8)	Nur Iffah 21' (o.g.); Puteri Noralisa 50' (pen.)	Report	Ruby Brooks 55' (pen.), 85' (pen.)	Stadium: Choa Chu Kang Stadium

15 Mar 2025 2	Tiong Bahru	1-7	Still Aerion	Choa Chu Kang
19:45 (GMT+8)	Christine Gan 26'	Report	Huraizah Ismail 4'; Sunisa S. 5', 11', 90+4' (pen.); Lila 32', 46'; Rayna Balqis 36' (o.g.)	Stadium: Choa Chu Kang Stadium; Player of the Match: Sunisa S.

13 Apr 2025 3	Geylang International	1-4	Still Aerion	Choa Chu Kang
17:00 (GMT+8)	Nurzahirah 52'	Report	Noralisa 11'; Sunisa S. 24'; Noralinda 60'; Unaisah 90'	Stadium: Choa Chu Kang Stadium; Player of the Match: Sunisa S.

20 Apr 2025 4	Still Aerion	P-P	Balestier Khalsa	Choa Chu Kang
17:00 (GMT+8)		Report		Stadium: Choa Chu Kang Stadium
Note: The match is postponed due to inclement weather. Revised fixtures will be announced in due course.

27 Apr 2025 5	Tanjong Pagar	P-P	Still Aerion	Choa Chu Kang
19:30 (GMT+8)				Stadium: Choa Chu Kang Stadium

4 May 2025 6	Still Aerion	P-P	Lion City Sailors	Choa Chu Kang
19:30 (GMT+8)				Stadium: Choa Chu Kang Stadium

10 May 2025 7	Albirex Niigata (S)	7-2	Still Aerion	Choa Chu Kang
19:30 (GMT+8)	R. Takashima 5', 16', 42', 80'; M. Fukuzawa 11'; K. Kitahara 22'; I. Ghani 47'		Unaisah 40', 88'	Stadium: Choa Chu Kang Stadium

17 May 2025 8	BG Tampines Rovers	1-4	Still Aerion	Choa Chu Kang
19:30 (GMT+8)			Lila 12', 56'; Idah 61'; Lauren 70'	Stadium: Choa Chu Kang Stadium; Player of the Match: Lila Tan

24 May 2025 9	Still Aerion	1-0	Tiong Bahru	Choa Chu Kang
17:00 (GMT+8)	Sunisa S. 49'			Stadium: Choa Chu Kang Stadium; Player of the Match: Sunisa S.

3 Aug 2025 4*	Still Aerion	10-0	Balestier Khalsa	Choa Chu Kang
17:00 (GMT+8)	Yoeurn 2', 8', 25+2'; Lila 5'; Thanaporn Y. 25'; Afiqah 45+1', 59'; Sunisa S. 53'; Huraizah 68'; Jaruwan C. 76'	Report		Stadium: Choa Chu Kang Stadium; Player of the Match: Yoeurn
Note: The match was rescheduled from 20 April 2025.

20 Aug 2025 5*	Tanjong Pagar	0-7	Still Aerion	Clementi
19:45 (GMT+8)			Yoeurn 6', 10'; Lila 11'; Sunisa S. 19'; Janet 45'; Jaruwan C. 55'; 58' (o.g.)	Stadium: Clementi Stadium; Player of the Match: Yoeurn

23 Aug 2025 10	Still Aerion	4-0	Hougang United	Choa Chu Kang
17:00 (GMT+8)	Sunisa S. 14', 34'; Yoeurn 36'; Jaruwan C. 44'	Report		Stadium: Choa Chu Kang Stadium; Player of the Match: Sunisa S.

30 Aug 2025 11	Hougang United	0-1	Still Aerion	Choa Chu Kang
17:00 (GMT+8)			Lila	Stadium: Choa Chu Kang Stadium; Player of the Match: Sunisa S.

7 Sep 2025 12	Still Aerion	3-0	Geylang International	Choa Chu Kang
17:00 (GMT+8)	Sunisa S. 42', 90+2'; Jaruwan C. 86'			Stadium: Choa Chu Kang Stadium; Player of the Match: Sunisa

14 Sep 2025 13	Balestier Khalsa	0-6	Still Aerion	Choa Chu Kang
17:00 (GMT+8)			Sunisa S. 18', 52'; Yoeurn 31', 39'; Thanaporn Y. 56'; Afiqah 59'	Stadium: Choa Chu Kang Stadium; Player of the Match: Sunisa

17 Sep 2025 6*	Still Aerion	3-2	Lion City Sailors	Clementi
19:45 (GMT+8)	Sunisa S. 50'; Umairah 90+1' (o.g.); Unaisah 90+5'	Report	Farah N. 5'; Sarah Z. 37'	Stadium: Clementi Stadium; Player of the Match: Sunisa

21 Sep 2025 14	Still Aerion	1-0	Tanjong Pagar	Choa Chu Kang
19:30 (GMT+8)	Sunisa S. 8'			Stadium: Choa Chu Kang Stadium; Player of the Match: Sunisa

28 Sep 2025 15	Lion City Sailors	2-2	Still Aerion	Choa Chu Kang
	Afiqah Omar 80' (o.g.); Sarah Z. 90+2'	Report	Sunisa S. 60'; Jaruwan C. 70'	Stadium: Choa Chu Kang Stadium

5 Oct 2025 16	Still Aerion WFC	0–5	Albirex Niigata (S)	Choa Chu Kang
			Izyani Ghani 18'; Sitianiwati Rosielin 31'; Kana Kitahara 43'; Ruriko Takashima 57', 59'	Stadium: Choa Chu Kang Stadium

League table

Pos	Team	Pld	W	D	L	GF	GA	GD	Pts	Qualification or relegation
1	Albirex Niigata (S) (C)	16	15	0	1	91	6	+85	45	Qualification for AFC Champions League
2	Still Aerion	16	12	2	2	57	21	+36	38	
3	Lion City Sailors	16	11	3	2	76	10	+66	36	
4	Geylang International	16	9	2	5	40	23	+17	29	
5	Hougang United	16	6	2	8	17	28	−11	20	
6	Tanjong Pagar United	16	4	0	12	11	43	−32	12	
7	Tiong Bahru	16	4	0	12	13	47	−34	12	
8	BG Tampines Rovers	16	3	2	11	17	57	−40	11	
9	Balestier Khalsa	16	2	1	13	11	98	−87	7	

Updated to match(es) played on 12 Oct 2025. Source: Women's Premier League
Rules for classification: 1) points; 2) goal difference; 3) number of goals scored; 4) number of wins
(C) League champions

=== Women's National League ===
(Played under name of Royal Arion WFC)

Fixtures and results

Win Draw Loss Postponed

14 Jun 2025 1	Eastern Thunder	3-0*	Royal Arion	XCL World Academy
15:00 UTC+8
Note: Eastern Thunder FC have been awarded a 3-0 win due to an infringement of the regulations in relation to substitution of players by Royal Arion Women's FC.

22 Jun 2025 6	Kaki Bukit	3-2	Royal Arion	Manjusri Secondary
17:00 UTC+8	Nur Batrisyia		Luana Carneiro

28 Jun 2025 7	GDT Circuit	0-4	Royal Arion	Fuhua Secondary
15:00 UTC+8			Elizabeth 15'; Libby 61'; Luana Carneiro 63', 74'	Player of the Match: Luana C.

5 Jul 2025 10	Unity FC	4-0	Royal Arion	XCL World Academy
15:00 UTC+8

13 Jul 2025 15	Royal Arion	1-4	Jungfrau Punggol	Manjusri Secondary
15:00 UTC+8	Luana Carneiro	Report	Serena; Erica; Sherlyn

27 Jul 2025 21	Royal Arion	1-3	Mattar Sailors	LCS Training Centre
19:00 UTC+8	Luana Carneiro		Remi Ogawa

2 Aug 2025 22	Royal Arion	P-P	Eastern Thunder	Fuhua Secondary
15:00 UTC+8
Note: The match has been rescheduled.

13 Aug 2025 22*	Royal Arion	0-2	Eastern Thunder	Our Tampines Hub
15:00 UTC+8			Brittanie; Ivy
Note: The match was rescheduled from 2 August 2025.

16 Aug 2025 25	Royal Arion	P-P	Kaki Bukit	Fuhua Secondary
15:00 UTC+8
Note: Match has been rescheduled

23 Aug 2025 28	Royal Arion	P-P	GDT Circuit	Fuhua Secondary
15:00 UTC+8
Note: The match has been rescheduled due to venue unavailability

27 Aug 2025 28*	Royal Arion	0-1	GDT Circuit	Fuhua Secondary
19:45 UTC+8
Note: The match has been rescheduled from 23 Aug 2025.

30 Aug 2025 31	Royal Arion	1-4	Unity FC	XCL World Academy
15:00 UTC+8

18 Sep 2025 25*	Royal Arion	4-1	Kaki Bukit	Yishun Stadium
19:45 UTC+8
Note: Match has been rescheduled from 16 Aug 2025.

34	Jungfrau Punggol	P-P	Royal Arion
UTC+8
Note: The match has been rescheduled

10 Sep 2025 34*	Jungfrau Punggol	4-1	Royal Arion	Clementi Stadium
19:45 UTC+8	Liesah; Annabel; Serena		Goal
Note: The match has been rescheduled from 6 Sep 2025.

21 Sep 2025 40	Mattar Sailors	2-0	Royal Arion	Clementi Stadium
17:00 UTC+8	Maxine 76'; Kate 90+2'	Report

Round Robin

Pos	Team	Pld	W	D	L	GF	GA	GD	Pts
1	Mattar Sailors FC (C)	12	10	1	1	51	8	+43	31
2	Jungfrau Punggol FC	12	9	1	2	35	13	+22	28
3	Eastern Thunder FC	12	8	1	3	34	9	+25	25
4	Unity FC	12	7	1	4	42	16	+26	22
5	Kaki Bukit SC	12	2	1	9	21	49	−28	7
6	Royal Arion Women's FC	12	2	0	10	14	31	−17	6
7	GDT Circuit FC	12	1	1	10	5	76	−71	4

Source: FAS
Rules for classification: 1) points; 2) goal difference; 3) number of goals scored; 4) number of wins
(C) Champions
