= 2025 Lion City Sailors Women season =

Lion City Sailors
2025 season
- Owner: Garena
- Chairman: Forrest Li
- Head coach: Muhammad Yusuf Chatyawan
- Premier League: 3rd
- Champions League: Group Stage
- National League: 1st (Mattar Sailors)
- Top goalscorer: Sarah Zu’risqha Zul’kepli (11 goals)
Home colours	Away colours	Third colours

The 2025 season marked the Lion City Sailors Women's fourth consecutive season in the top flight of Singapore football and in the Women's Premier League. They were the reigning champion in the league.

== Kits ==
Kits using Puma's trademark
Home	Away	Goalkeeper Home ^{1}	Goalkeeper Away ^{2}

== Squad ==
The Sailors Women were considered to have a strong squad, with a good mix of experience and youth.

=== Women squad (LCS) ===
Squad No.	Name	Nationality	Date of birth (age)	Previous club	Contract Since	Contract end
Goalkeeper
1	Izairida Shakira	(Singapore)	2 June 2007 (age 19)	(Singapore) Mattar Sailors (W)	2024	2025
22	Beatrice Tan Li Bin (Note: Beatrice not registered for ACL Competition Group Match)	(Singapore)	29 June 1992 (age 34)	(Singapore) Tanjong Pagar United (W)	2022	2025
51	Hazel Lim Ya Ting	(Singapore)	3 March 2002 (age 24)	(Australia) Croydon City Arrows	2025	2025
99	Alysha Nasrina (Note: Alysha Nasrina registered for ACL Competition only)	(Singapore)	23 October 2007 (age 18)	(Singapore) Geylang International (W)	2024	2025
	Nurul Haziqah Haszman (Note: Haziqah Haszman not registered for ACL Competition Group Match)	(Singapore)	29 April 2003 (age 23)	(Japan) Albirex Niigata (S)	2025	2025
Defender
3	Wang Jiaxin (Note: Wang Jiaxin registered for ACL Competition only)	(China)	11 August 2003 (age 23)	(China) Luoyang University	2025	2025
4	Umairah Hamdan	(Singapore)	11 March 2002 (age 24)	(Singapore) South Avenue CSC	2022	2025
5	Irsalina Irwan (Note: Irsalina Irwan registered for ACL Competition only)	(Singapore)	1 January 2007 (age 19)	(Singapore) Mattar Sailors (W)	2025	2025
8	Syazwani Ruzi	(Singapore)	6 March 2001 (age 25)	(Singapore) Still Aerion	2022	2025
13	Mira Ruzana (Note: Mira Ruzana not registered for ACL Competition Group Match)	(Singapore)	6 January 2001 (age 25)	(Singapore) Still Aerion	2025	2025
14	Hikaru Shibusawa (Note: Hikaru Shibusawa registered for ACL Competition only)	(Japan)	3 March 2000 (age 26)	(Japan) Bunnys Gunma (J2)	2025	2025
17	Khairunnisa Anwar	(Singapore)	21 February 2003 (age 23)	(Singapore) South Avenue CSC	2022	2025
27	Tia Foong Po Shiun (Note: Tia Foong not registered for ACL Competition Group Match)	(Singapore)	31 July 2007 (age 19)	(Singapore) Mattar Sailors (W)	2022	2025
76	Tyan Foong (Note: Tyan Foong not registered for ACL Competition Group Match)	(Singapore)	19 April 2009 (age 17)	(Singapore) Mattar Sailors (W)	2024	2025
80	Siti Nurerwadah Erwan	(Singapore)	26 June 2004 (age 22)	(Singapore) Geylang International (W)	2025	2025
Midfielder
2	Zhang Qiaoling (Note: Zhang Qiaoling registered for ACL Competition only)	(China)	30 January 2004 (age 22)	(China) Hainan University	2025	2025
7	Rivka Ramji (Note: Rivka Ramji registered for ACL Competition only)	(India)	29 October 2006 (age 19)	(India) Sethu FC (I1)	2025	2025
12	Anaya Sehgal (Note: Anaya Sehgal registered for WPL only)	(India)	7 December 2008 (age 17)	(Singapore) JSSL Tampines	2025	2025
15	Qarissa Putri Ramadhani	(Singapore)	24 September 2008 (age 18)	(Singapore) Tanjong Pagar United (W)	2024	2025
16	Ho Huixin	(Singapore)	23 April 1992 (age 34)	(Singapore) Home United (W)	2022	2025
23	Sarah Zu’risqha Zul’kepli (Note: Sarah Zu’risqha not registered for ACL Competition Group Match)	(Singapore)	24 July 2006 (age 20)	(Japan) Albirex Niigata (S)	2024	2025
24	Nurhidayu Naszri	(Singapore)	16 March 2004 (age 22)	(Singapore) JSSL Tampines	2024	2025
32	Nur Ain Salleh	(Singapore)	7 January 2010 (age 16)	(Spain) Madrid CFF Youth	2024	2025
33	Amelia Ng Jing Xuan	(Singapore)	16 August 2010 (age 16)	(Singapore) Mattar Sailors (W)	2025	2025
77	Dhaniyah Qasimah	(Singapore)	7 July 2004 (age 22)	(Singapore) Albirex Niigata (S) (W)	2025	2025
88	Sofia Rusi	(Finland)	4 September 2012 (age 14)	Youth Team	2026	2026
90	Wan Nashirah Mohammed	(Singapore)	4 August 2005 (age 21)	(Singapore) Geylang International (W)	2025	2025
Forwards
6	Eri Kitagawa (Note: Eri Kitagawa registered for ACL Competition only)	(Japan)	8 April 2004 (age 22)	(Japan) Omiya Ardija Ventus	2025	2025
9	Raeka Ee Pei Ying	(Singapore)	16 September 2003 (age 23)	(Singapore) Mattar Sailors (W)	2023	2025
10	Farah Nurzahirah	(Singapore)	13 January 2004 (age 22)	(Singapore) Geylang International (W)	2025	2025
11	Ami Takeuchi (Note: Ami Takeuchi registered for ACL Competition only)	(Japan)	6 December 2005 (age 20)	(Japan) Urawa Red Diamonds Ladies	2025	2025
20	Dorcas Chu	(Singapore)	29 July 2002 (age 24)	(Singapore) Mattar Sailors (W)	2022	2025
28	Putri Alyiah Seow (Note: Putri Alyiah Seow not registered for ACL Competition Group Match)	(Malaysia)	19 March 2003 (age 23)	(Singapore) Mattar Sailors (W)	2025	2025
	Nicole Lim (Note: Nicole Lim registered for ACL Competition only)	(Singapore)	4 October 2002 (age 24)	(Singapore) Hougang United (W)	2025	2025
	Josephine Ang Kaile	(Singapore)	26 September 2006 (age 20)	(Singapore) Mattar Sailors (W)	2022	2024
Mid-season transferred players
2	Madison Josephine Telmer	(Canada)	29 October 2004 (age 21)	(United States) Old Dominion University	2022	2025
3	Riari Kitaoka (Note: Riari Kitaoka registered for ACL Competition only)	(Japan)	12 August 2003 (age 23)	(Japan) Toyo University	2025	2025
5	Sakurako Ohashi (Note: Sakurako Ohashi registered for ACL Competition only)	(Japan)	8 April 2004 (age 22)	(Japan) Toyo University	2025	2025
6	Seri Nurinsyirah	(Singapore)	29 January 2009 (age 17)	(Singapore) Mattar Sailors (W)	2023	2025
7	Miyu Inayama (Note: Miyu Inayama registered for ACL Competition only)	(Japan)	5 August 2003 (age 23)	(Japan) JEF United Ichihara Chiba Ladies	2025	2025
7	Cara Ming-Yan Chang	(Singapore)	28 November 2008 (age 17)	(Singapore) Mattar Sailors (W)	2022	2025
10	Priscille Le Helloco	(France)	8 January 2007 (age 19)	(Singapore) JSSL Tampines	2024	2025
11	Liyana Indah Rickit	(Singapore)	14 October 2009 (age 16)	(Singapore) Mattar Sailors (W)	2022	2025
19	Yuvika Suresh	(Singapore)	1 March 2009 (age 17)	(Singapore) Mattar Sailors (W)	2022	2025
25	Nor Adriana Lim	(Singapore)	2009	(Singapore) Mattar Sailors (W)	2025	2025

=== Women squad (Mattar Sailors) ===
Squad No.	Name	Nationality	Date of birth (age)	Previous club	Contract Since	Contract end
Goalkeeper
1	Julia Young	(Singapore)		(Singapore)	2025	2025
18	Tamara Chang	(Singapore)		(Singapore)	2025	2025
Defender
4	Nadia Nuraffendi	(Singapore)		(Singapore) Lion City Sailors (W)	2023	2025
6	Rasyiqah Miza	(Singapore)		(Singapore)	2025	2025
13	Katelyn Yeoh	(Singapore)		(Singapore)	2025	2025
14	Isis Ang	(Singapore)		(Singapore)	2025	2025
17	Carolyn Chan	(Singapore)		(Singapore)	2025	2025
21	Syaizta Ohorella	(Singapore)	10 February 2009 (age 17)	(Singapore)	2023	2025
22	Tasha Foong Po Yui	(Singapore)	27 May 2005 (age 21)	(Singapore) ITE College East	2022	2025
24	Clara Wong	(Singapore)		(Singapore) Royal Arion	2025	2025
41	Irsalina Irwan	(Singapore)	1 January 2007 (age 19)	(United States) IMG Academy (USA)	2025	2025
99	Syahirah Issaka	(Singapore)		(Singapore)	2025	2025
Midfielder
8	Joyce Foo	(Singapore)		(Singapore) Still Aerion	2025	2025
10	Tharshini Rajasegar	(Singapore)		(Singapore) Still Aerion	2025	2025
11	Jaen Lee	(Singapore)		(Singapore)	2023	2025
15	Natalie Ng	(Singapore)		(Singapore)	2025	2025
20	Nayli Elvira Sha'aril	(Singapore)	1 October 2009 (age 17)	(Singapore)	2025	2025
23	Remi Ogawa	(Japan)		(Singapore) Royal Arion	2025	2025
25	Nurhannah Qistina	(Singapore)		(Singapore) Still Aerion	2025	2025
39	Erina Oyama	(Japan)		(Singapore)	2025	2025
Forward
5	Milan Kaur	(Singapore)		(Singapore)	2025	2025
7	Maxine Maribbay	(Singapore)	21 April 2005 (age 21)		2023	2025
9	Maite Jones	(Singapore)		(Singapore)	2025	2025
19	Hannah Abdullahsiraj	(Singapore)		(Singapore)	2025	2025
95	Sri Ravi Sivashankar	(Singapore)		(Singapore)	2025	2025

== Staff ==
The following list displays the coaching and administrative staff of Lion City Sailors FC:

First Team

Position	Name
Head Coach (Women)	(Indonesia) Muhammad Yusuf Chatyawan
Assistant Coach (Women)	(Singapore) Daniel Ong

== Transfers ==
=== In ===
Pre-season

Position	Player	Transferred from	Team	Ref
DF	(Singapore) Mira Ruzana	(Singapore) Still Aerion WFC	Women	Free
MF	(India) Anaya Sehgal	(Singapore) BG Tampines Rovers (W)	Women	Free
MF	(Singapore) Dhaniyah Qasimah	(Singapore) Albirex Niigata (S) (W)	Women	Free

Mid-season 1

Position	Player	Transferred from	Team	Ref
DF	(Canada) Madison Josephine Telmer	(United States) Old Dominion University	Women	Season loan till July 2025
FW	(Singapore) Nur Ain Salleh	(Spain) Madrid CFF Youth	Women	Loan
DF	(Singapore) Siti Nurerwadah Erwan	(Singapore) Geylang International	Women	Free
MF	(Singapore) Wan Nashirah Mohammed	(Singapore) Geylang International	Women	Free
FW	(Singapore) Farah Nurzahirah	(Singapore) Geylang International	Women	Free
MF	(Japan) Ami Takeuchi	(Japan) Urawa Red Diamonds Ladies	Women	Free
DF	(Japan) Sakurako Ohashi	(Japan) Toyo University	Women	Loan
MF	(Japan) Riari Kitaoka	(Japan) Toyo University	Women	Loan
MF	(Japan) Miyu Inayama	(Japan) JEF United Ichihara Chiba Ladies	Women	Loan
FW	(Japan) Eri Kitagawa	(Japan) Omiya Ardija Ventus	Women	Free
GK	(Singapore) Nurul Haziqah	Free Agent	Women	Free
GK	(Singapore) Hazel Lim	Free Agent	Women	Free

Mid-season 2 (Note: Special window for AFC Women Champions League proper)

Position	Player	Transferred from	Team	Ref
GK	(Singapore) Alysha Nasrina	(Singapore) Geylang International	Women	Free
DF	(Singapore) Irsalina Irwan	(Singapore) Mattar Sailors (W)	Women	Promoted
DF	(China) Wang Jiaxin	(China)	Women	Free
DF	(Japan) Hikaru Shibusawa	(Japan) Bunnys Gunma (J2)	Women	Free
MF	(China) Zhang Qiaoling	(China)	Women	Free
MF	(India) Rivka Ramji	(India) Sethu FC (I1)	Women	Free
FW	(Singapore) Nicole Lim	(Singapore) Hougang United (W)	Women	Free

=== Out ===
Preseason

Position	Player	Transferred To	Team	Ref
GK	(France) (Singapore) Talia Sachet	(Singapore) Balestier Khalsa (W)	Mattar Sailors	Free
GK	(Singapore) (Philippines) Chantale Lamasan Rosa	(Singapore)	Mattar Sailors	Free (Note: Celine Koh subsequently moves to IMG Academy till 2028)
DF	(Philippines) (United States) Sara Hayduchok	(Malaysia) KL Rangers FC (W)	Women	Free
DF	(Canada) Madison Josephine Telmer	(United States) Old Dominion University	Women	Free
MF	(Singapore) Natasha Kaur	(Singapore) Geylang International	Women	Free
MF	(Japan) Miray Hokotate Altun		Women	Free
MF	(Singapore) Seri Ayu Natasha Naszri	(Spain) ESC La Liga Academy	Women	Free (Note: Natasha Naszri played for LCS Women Team in Women Premier League before joining sister team, Mattar City Sailors (W) in the Women National League)
FW	(Singapore) Verona Lim Ruo Ya	(Japan) Albirex Niigata (W)	Mattar Sailors	Free (Note: Celine Koh subsequently moves to IMG Academy till 2028)
FW	(Singapore) Nur Ain Salleh	(Spain) Madrid CFF Youth	Women	Free; 4 years till 2029
FW	(Singapore) Celine Koh	(Singapore) Tiong Bahru FC (W)	Mattar Sailors	Free (Note: Celine Koh subsequently moves to IMG Academy till 2028)

Mid-season 1

Position	Player	Transferred To	Team	Ref
DF	(Singapore) Seri Nurinsyirah	(United States) IMG Academy	First Team	Scholarship till 2028
DF	(Singapore) Yuvika Suresh	(United States) IMG Academy	First Team	Scholarship till 2028
MF	(Singapore) Liyana Rickit	(United States) IMG Academy	First Team	Scholarship till 2028
DF	(France) Priscille Le Helloco		First Team	Free. Left for Study
FW	(Singapore) Cara Ming-Yan Chang		First Team	Free. Left for Study
FW	(Singapore) Nor Adriana Lim		First Team	Injured, ACL

Mid-season 2 (Note: Special window for AFC Women Champions League proper)

Position	Player	Transferred from	Team	Ref
DF	(Japan) Sakurako Ohashi	(Japan) Toyo University	Women	End of Loan
MF	(Japan) Riari Kitaoka	(Japan) Toyo University	Women	End of Loan
MF	(Japan) Miyu Inayama	(Japan) JEF United Ichihara Chiba Ladies	Women	End of Loan

Postseason

Position	Player	Transferred from	Team	Ref
DF	(Japan) Hikaru Shibusawa	(Japan) Fukuoka J. Anclas (J2)	Women	Free
MF	(Singapore) Dorcas Chu	Retired	First Team	N.A.

=== Loans In ===
Mid-Season

Position	Player	Transferred From	Team	Ref

== Friendlies ==
=== Pre-season friendlies ===
Win Draw Loss

== Team statistics ==
=== Appearances and goals (Women) ===
As of 19 Nov 25

No.	Pos.	Player	WPL		AFC Champions League		Total	
No.	Pos.	Player	Apps.	Goals	Apps.	Goals	Apps.	Goals
1	GK	(Singapore) Izairida Shakira	6	0	5	0	11	0
2	MF	(China) Zhang Qiaoling	0	0	1+1	0	2	0
3	DF	(China) Wang Jiaxin	0	0	3	0	3	0
4	DF	(Singapore) Nur Umairah	14+1	3	6	0	21	3
5	DF	(Singapore) Irsalina Irwan	0	0	1+1	0	2	0
6	FW	(Japan) Eri Kitagawa	0	0	6	0	6	0
7	MF	(India) Rivka Ramji	0	0	1+2	0	3	0
8	DF	(Singapore) Nur Syazwani Ruzi	15+1	4	6	0	22	4
9	FW	(Singapore) Raeka Ee Pei Ying	8	7	5	0	13	7
10	FW	(Singapore) Farah Nurzahirah	9	13	0+5	0	14	13
11	MF	(Japan) Ami Takeuchi	0	0	6	4	6	4
12	MF	(India) Anaya Sehgal	0+2	0	0	0	2	1
13	DF	(Singapore) Mira Ruzana	1+1	0	0	0	2	0
14	DF	(Japan) Hikaru Shibusawa	0	0	3	0	3	0
15	MF	(Singapore) Qarissa Putri Ramadhani	11+1	1	0+3	0	15	1
16	MF	(Singapore) Ho Hui Xin	5	0	0	0	5	0
17	DF	(Singapore) Khairunnisa Anwar	12	0	2+1	0	15	0
20	FW	(Singapore) Dorcas Chu	9+2	3	0+6	0	17	3
22	GK	(Singapore) Beatrice Tan	5	0	1	0	6	0
23	MF	(Singapore) Sarah Zu’risqha Zul’kepli	14	12	3	1	16	13
24	MF	(Singapore) Nurhidayu Naszri	12+1	2	1+2	0	16	2
26	FW	(Singapore) Nicole Lim	0	0	0+1	0	1	0
27	DF	(Singapore) Tia Foong Po Shiun	2+1	0	0	0	3	0
28	FW	(Malaysia) (Netherlands) Putri Alyiah Seow	4+5	8	0+1	0	10	8
32	FW	(Singapore) Nur Ain Salleh	1	0	1+4	1	6	1
33	MF	(Singapore) Amelia Ng Jing Xuan	2+3	0	0	0	5	0
51	GK	(Singapore) Hazel Lim	5	0	0	0	5	0
76	DF	(Singapore) Tyan Foong	1+1	1	0	0	2	1
77	MF	(Singapore) Dhaniyah Qasimah	15	4	6	0	21	4
80	MF	(Singapore) Siti Nurerwadah Erwan	8	0	0	0	8	0
90	MF	(Singapore) Wan Nashirah Mohammed	5	1	0	0	5	1
99	GK	(Singapore) Alysha Nasrina	0	0	0	0	0	0
Players who have played this season but had left the club or on loan to other club
2	MF	(Canada) Madison Telmer	2	4	0	0	2	4
3	MF	(Japan) Riari Kitaoka	0	0	3	0	3	0
5	DF	(Japan) Sakurako Ohashi	0	0	3	0	3	0
6	DF	(Singapore) Seri Nurinsyirah	2+1	3	0	0	3	3
7	MF	(Japan) Miyu Inayama	0	0	3	2	3	2
7	MF	(Singapore) Cara Ming-Yan Chang	1+2	0	0	0	3	0
10	FW	(France) Priscille Le Helloco	5+1	1	0	0	6	1
11	MF	(Singapore) Liyana Indah Rickit	2	1	0	0	2	1
19	MF	(Singapore) Yuvika Suresh	2+4	3	0	0	6	3
25	FW	(Singapore) Nor Adriana Lim	0+4	3	0	0	4	3

=== Appearances and goals (Mattar Sailors) ===
As of 13 Oct 2023

No.	Pos.	Player	WNL	
No.	Pos.	Player	Apps.	Goals
1	GK	(Singapore) Chantale Lamasan Rosa	4	0
2	DF	(Singapore) Rayna Balqis	3	2
3	DF	(Singapore) Fatin Aqillah	2	0
5	DF	(Singapore) Lopez	1	0
6	DF	(Singapore) Putri Alyiah Seow	3	3
7	FW	(Singapore) Nor Adriana Lim	4	7
8	FW	(Singapore) Celine Koh	3	1
9	FW	(Singapore) Liyana Indah Rickit	3+1	4
10	MF	(Singapore) Verona Lim Ruo Ya	2+1	1
11	MF	(Singapore) Jaen Lee	1+2	2
12	MF	(Singapore) Amelia Ng Jing Xuan	1	0
15	FW	(Singapore) Maxine Maribbay	2	0
17	MF	(Singapore) Carol	1	0
19	DF	(Singapore) Tyan Foong	1	0
21	DF	(Singapore) Syaizta Ohorella	2	0
22	DF	(Singapore) Tasha Foong Po Yui	3	0
24	MF	(Singapore) Mayvin Chan	2	3
25	DF	(Singapore) Gerry	1	0
27	DF	(Singapore) Milan	1	0
?	FW	(Singapore) Katelyn Yeoh	0	0
?	GK	(Singapore) Talia Sachet	0	0
Players who have played this season but had left the club or on loan to other club

== Competition ==
2025 Women's Premier League is:

=== Women's Premier League ===
Win Draw Loss

8 March 2025 1	Albirex Niigata (S) (Singapore)	1–2	(Singapore) Lion City Sailors	Choa Chu Kang
	Ruriko Takashima 29'	Report	Raeka Ee Pei Ying 39'; Nor Adriana Lim 83'	Stadium: Choa Chu Kang Stadium

16 March 2025 2	Lion City Sailors (Singapore)	9–0	(Singapore) Balestier Khalsa	Choa Chu Kang
	Putri Alyiah Seow 3'; Raeka Ee Pei Ying 23'; Liyana Indah Rickit 32'; Nur Syazwani Ruzi 44'; Yuvika Suresh 51', 58'; Sarah Zu’risqha Zul’kepli 69'; Nurhidayu Naszri 77'; Nur Umairah 90'	Report		Stadium: Choa Chu Kang Stadium

24 September 2025 3 (Rescheduled)	Tanjong Pagar United (Singapore)	0–7	(Singapore) Lion City Sailors	Bukit Gombak
			Farah Nurzahirah 6', 19', 81'; Syazwani Ruzi 24'; Qarissa Putri 27'; Dorcas Chu 49'; Dhaniyah Qasimah 66'	Stadium: Bukit Gombak Stadium

13 April 2025 4	Lion City Sailors (Singapore)	0–0	(Singapore) Hougang United	Choa Chu Kang
	Nur Syazwani Ruzi (penalty missed) 84			Stadium: Choa Chu Kang Stadium

19 April 2025 5	BG Tampines Rovers (Singapore)	2–9	(Singapore) Lion City Sailors	Choa Chu Kang
	Anna Seng 4'; Ruby Brooks 56'	Report	Putri Alyiah Seow 22', 28', 70', 80'; Sarah Zu’risqha Zul’kepli 43', 45+1', 54'; Raeka Ee Pei Ying 66'; Anaya Sehgal 89'	Stadium: Choa Chu Kang Stadium

1 October 2025 6 (Rescheduled)	Lion City Sailors (Singapore)	6–0	(Singapore) Tiong Bahru FC	Choa Chu Kang
	Dhaniyah Qasimah 11'; Dorcas Chu 38'; Syazwani Ruzi 44'; Farah Nurzahirah 47'; Tyan Foong 83'; Nur Umairah 87'			Stadium: Choa Chu Kang Stadium

17 September 2025 7 (Rescheduled)	Still Aerion WFC (Singapore)	3–2	(Singapore) Lion City Sailors	Choa Chu Kang
	Sunisa Srangthaisong 49'; Nur Umairah 90' (o.g.); Nurul Unaisah 90+5'		Farah Nurzahirah 5'; Sarah Zu’risqha Zul’kepli 37'	Stadium: Choa Chu Kang Stadium

10 May 2025 8	Lion City Sailors (Singapore)	8–0	(Singapore) Geylang International	Choa Chu Kang
	Nurhidayu Naszri 16'; Raeka Ee Pei Ying 20', 43', 53', 81'; Priscille Le Helloco 32'; Sarah Zu’risqha Zul’kepli 47', 56'			Stadium: Choa Chu Kang Stadium

18 May 2025 9	Lion City Sailors (Singapore)	0–1	(Singapore) Albirex Niigata (S)	Choa Chu Kang
			Ruriko Takashima 22'	Stadium: Choa Chu Kang Stadium

24 May 2025 10	Balestier Khalsa (Singapore)	0–14	(Singapore) Lion City Sailors	Choa Chu Kang
			Seri Nurinsyirah 3', 15', 40'; Madison Josephine Telmer 6', 45', 46', 51'; Syazwani Ruzi 31'; Yuvika Suresh 41'; Nor Adriana Lim 48', 60'; Sarah Zu’risqha Zul’kepli 53'; Putri Alyiah Seow 74', 90'	Stadium: Choa Chu Kang Stadium

16 August 2025 11	Lion City Sailors (Singapore)	1–0	(Singapore) Tanjong Pagar United	Choa Chu Kang
	Nur Umairah 62'			Stadium: Choa Chu Kang Stadium

7 September 2025 12	Hougang United (Singapore)	0–2	(Singapore) Lion City Sailors	Choa Chu Kang
			Farah Nurzahirah 11', 71'	Stadium: Choa Chu Kang Stadium

13 September 2025 13	Lion City Sailors (Singapore)	12–0	(Singapore) BG Tampines Rovers	Choa Chu Kang
	Dorcas Chu 2'; Dhaniyah Qasimah 10'; Wan Nashirah 17'; Farah Nurzahirah 29', 36', 73', 90+1', 90+5'; Sarah Zu’risqha Zul’kepli 35', 71', 84'; Putri Alyiah Seow 83'			Stadium: Choa Chu Kang Stadium

21 September 2025 14	Tiong Bahru FC (Singapore)	0–1	(Singapore) Lion City Sailors	Choa Chu Kang
			Farah Nurzahirah 80'	Stadium: Choa Chu Kang Stadium

28 September 2025 15	Lion City Sailors (Singapore)	2–2	(Singapore) Still Aerion WFC	Choa Chu Kang
	Afiqah Omar 80' (o.g.); Sarah Zu’risqha Zul’kepli 90+2'		60'; 72'	Stadium: Choa Chu Kang Stadium

5 October 2025 16 (Rescheduled)	Geylang International (Singapore)	1–1	(Singapore) Lion City Sailors	Choa Chu Kang
	Farhanah Ruhaizat 87'		Dhaniyah Qasimah 84'	Stadium: Choa Chu Kang Stadium

League table

Pos	Team	Pld	W	D	L	GF	GA	GD	Pts	Qualification or relegation
1	Albirex Niigata (S) (C)	16	15	0	1	91	6	+85	45	Qualification for AFC Champions League
2	Still Aerion	16	12	2	2	57	21	+36	38	
3	Lion City Sailors	16	11	3	2	76	10	+66	36	
4	Geylang International	16	9	2	5	40	23	+17	29	
5	Hougang United	16	6	2	8	17	28	−11	20	
6	Tanjong Pagar United	16	4	0	12	11	43	−32	12	
7	Tiong Bahru	16	4	0	12	13	47	−34	12	
8	BG Tampines Rovers	16	3	2	11	17	57	−40	11	
9	Balestier Khalsa	16	2	1	13	11	98	−87	7	

Updated to match(es) played on 12 Oct 2025. Source: Women's Premier League
Rules for classification: 1) points; 2) goal difference; 3) number of goals scored; 4) number of wins
(C) League champions

=== AFC Women's Champions League ===
==== Qualifying Round ====
25 August 2025 Preliminary Stage Grp Match 1	Etihad Club (Jordan)	0–2	(Singapore) Lion City Sailors	Melaka, Malaysia
			Ami Takeuchi 10', 39'	Stadium: Hang Jebat Stadium; Attendance: 36; Referee: Mahnaz Zokaee (Iran)

28 August 2025 Preliminary Stage Grp Match 2	Lion City Sailors (Singapore)	3–1	(Malaysia) Kelana United	Melaka, Malaysia
	Miyu Inayama 11'; Nur Ain Salleh 62'; Ami Takeuchi 69'		Viny Silfianus 90+1'	Stadium: Hang Jebat Stadium; Attendance: 115; Referee: Yang Shu-ting (Chinese Taipei)

31 August 2025 Preliminary Stage Grp Match 3	Lion City Sailors (Singapore)	3–0	(Kyrgyzstan) Sdyushor SI – Asiagoal	Melaka, Malaysia
	Ami Takeuchi 10'; Miyu Inayama 35'; Sarah Zu’risqha Zul’kepli 63'			Stadium: Hang Jebat Stadium; Referee: Alesar Baddour (Syria)

Pos	Team	Pld	W	D	L	GF	GA	GD	Pts	Qualification
1	(Singapore) Lion City Sailors (Q)	3	3	0	0	8	1	+7	9	Advance to group stage
2	(Jordan) Etihad	3	2	0	1	7	3	+4	6	
3	(Malaysia) Kelana United	3	0	1	2	1	7	−6	1	
4	(Kyrgyzstan) Sdyushor SI – Asiagoal	3	0	1	2	1	6	−5	1	

Updated to match(es) played on 24 August 2025. Source: AFC
Rules for classification: Tiebreakers
(Q) Qualified for the phase indicated

==== Group Stage ====
13 November 2025 Grp Match 1	Lion City Sailors (Singapore)	0–5	(Australia) Melbourne City	Ho Chi Minh City, Vietnam
		Report	Holly McNamara 11' (pen.), 45+1' (pen.); Alexia Apostolakis 55'; Danella Butrus 58'; Caitlin Karic 73'	Stadium: Thong Nhat Stadium; Attendance: 512; Referee: Oh Hyeon-jeong (South Korea)

16 November 2025 Grp Match 2	Lion City Sailors (Singapore)	0–2	(Vietnam) Hồ Chí Minh City	Ho Chi Minh City, Vietnam
		Report	Trần Nguyễn Bảo Châu 83'; K'Thủa 90+3'	Stadium: Thong Nhat Stadium; Attendance: 925; Referee: Dong Fangyu (China)

19 November 2025 Grp Match 3	Lion City Sailors (Singapore)	0–5	(Philippines) Stallion Laguna	Ho Chi Minh City, Vietnam
		Report	Halle Johnson 22'; Chandler McDaniel 42', 90'; Tayla Christensen 75', 84'	Stadium: Thong Nhat Stadium; Referee: Veronika Bernatskaia (Kyrgyzstan)

Pos	Team	Pld	W	D	L	GF	GA	GD	Pts	Qualification
1	(Australia) Melbourne City	3	3	0	0	15	0	+15	9	Advance to Quarter-finals
2	(Vietnam) Hồ Chí Minh City	3	2	0	1	3	3	0	6	Advance to Quarter-finals
3	(Philippines) Stallion Laguna	3	1	0	2	5	8	−3	3	Possible Quarter-finals
4	(Singapore) Lion City Sailors	3	0	0	3	0	12	−12	0	

Updated to match(es) played on 19 Nov 2025. Source: AFC
Rules for classification: Tiebreakers

== Competition (Women's National League) ==
(Played under name of Mattar Sailors Women)

Win Draw Loss

15 Jun 2025 1	GDT Circuit	0–8	Mattar Sailors	LCS Training Centre
19:00 UTC+8		Report	Tharshini; Maite; Maxine; Nayli; Milan

21 Jun 2025 2	Jungfrau Punggol	1–2	Mattar Sailors	LCS Training Centre
19:00 UTC+8	Serena	Report	Maite Jones; Maxine Maribbay

29 Jun 2025 3	Mattar Sailors	1–1	Unity FC	LCS Training Centre
19:00 UTC+8	Rasyiqah	Report

6 July 2025 4	Mattar Sailors	7–0	Kaki Bukit	LCS Training Centre
19:00 UTC+8	Milan; Maxine; Remi; Jaen; (o.g.)	Report

20 July 2025 5	Eastern Thunder	2–1	Mattar Sailors	Manjusri Secondary
17:00 UTC+8

27 July 2025 6	Royal Arion	1–3	Mattar Sailors	LCS Training Centre
19:00 UTC+8

3 August 2025 7	Mattar Sailors	11–0	GDT Circuit	LCS Training Centre
19:00 UTC+8

August 2025 8 (Rescheduled)	Mattar Sailors	3–1	Jungfrau Punggol	LCS Training Centre
19:00 UTC+8

23 August 2025 9	Unity FC	1–5	Mattar Sailors	XCL World Academy
19:00 UTC+8

31 August 2025 10	Kaki Bukit SC	1–7	Mattar Sailors	LCS Training Centre
19:00 UTC+8

Round Robin

Pos	Team	Pld	W	D	L	GF	GA	GD	Pts
1	Mattar Sailors FC (C)	12	10	1	1	51	8	+43	31
2	Jungfrau Punggol FC	12	9	1	2	35	13	+22	28
3	Eastern Thunder FC	12	8	1	3	34	9	+25	25
4	Unity FC	12	7	1	4	42	16	+26	22
5	Kaki Bukit SC	12	2	1	9	21	49	−28	7
6	Royal Arion Women's FC	12	2	0	10	14	31	−17	6
7	GDT Circuit FC	12	1	1	10	5	76	−71	4

Source: FAS
Rules for classification: 1) points; 2) goal difference; 3) number of goals scored; 4) number of wins
(C) Champions
