= Yon Yoeurn =

Cambodian footballer (born 2000)

Personal information
- Date of birth: 9 July 2000 (age 26)
- Place of birth: Thnal Toteung Village, Prambei Mum Commune, Cambodia
- Height: 1.75 m (5 ft 9 in)
- Position: Forward

Team information
- Current team: Nagaworld
- Number: 9

Senior career*
Years	Team	Apps	(Gls)
2019–	Nagaworld	12	(26)
2024	→ Young Elephants (loan)	3	(1)
2025	→ Bangkok W.F.C. (loan)		(3)
2025	→ Still Aerion WFC (loan)	7	(8)

International career^{‡}
2015–2016	Cambodia U16	3	(1)
2022–	Cambodia	12	(2)
- * Club domestic league appearances and goals ‡ National team caps and goals as of 15 May 2023

Yon Yoeurn also written as Yon Yeurn (Khmer: យ៉ុន យ៉ើន; born 9 July 2000) is a Cambodian professional footballer who plays as a Forward for Cambodian Women's League club Nagaworld, and the Cambodia women's national team.

== Early life ==
Yon started playing football at the age of 9, However, due to family challenges, she played inconsistently and suspended her studies for 2–3 years before completing 12th grade.

== Club career ==
In 2019, Yon Yoeurn was selected to join the football club Nagaworld FC, marking a key career milestone.

In March 2022, Yoeurn was awarded Player of the Year following the end of the season.

On 19 June 2024, Yoeurn joined Lao Women's League club Young Elephants on loan for their 2024–25 AFC Women's Champions League Preliminary Stage campaign, becoming the first locally developed female player to play abroad. On 25 August 2024, she scored the club first goal at international stage against Abu Dhabi Country Club in the 83th minute. becoming the first Cambodian and Southeast Asian to score in the competition. Yoeurn scoring three goals and Saody contributing one, helping their team achieve an impressive third place in the league.

Along with team-mate Hok Saody, Yoeurn joined Bangkok Women's FC for the Thai Women's League in January 2025. The transfer was facilitated by NagaWorld FC's Technical Director, Therdsak Chaiman, a legendary figure in Thai football. Yoeurn scored three goals to help her team achieved an impressive third place in the league.

In July 2025, Yoeurn joined Still Aerion WFC on a short-term loan to play in the Singapore Women's Premier League. She made seven appearances and scoring eight goals during her stay. Yoeurn decided to return to NagaWorld FC after the club was hit by several injuries among key player.

== International career ==
In April 2022, Yon was called up to the Cambodia senior national team to compete in the 2021 SEA Games. Later that year, she was selected for the final squad for the 2022 AFF Women's Championship in the Philippines that secured the country best finish to date.

In 2023, during 2023 SEA Games hosted in Cambodia, Yon scored a brace against Laos in the 10th and 37th minute, securing the team's first victory against an opponent other than East Timor.

== Career statistics ==
=== International ===
As of match played 23 November 2024

Appearances and goals by national team and year
National team	Year	Apps	Goals
Cambodia	2022	6	0
Cambodia	2023	6	2
Cambodia	2024	1	0
Total		13	2

Scores and results list Cambodia's goal tally first, score column indicates score after each Yon goal.

List of international goals scored by Yon Yoeurn
No.	Date	Venue	Opponent	Score	Result	Competition
1	3 May 2023	RSN Stadium, Phnom Penh, Cambodia	Laos	1–0	2–0	2023 SEA Games
2	3 May 2023	RSN Stadium, Phnom Penh, Cambodia	Laos	2–0	2–0	2023 SEA Games
3	6 June 2026	Arcamanik Stadium, Bandung, Indonesia	Singapore	4–0	5–0	Friendly
