= 2025 Women's Premier League (Singapore) =

24th season of the Singapore Women's Premier League

Women's Premier League
- Season: 2025
- Dates: 1 March – 12 October
- Champions: Albirex Niigata (S)
- AFC Champions League: Albirex Niigata (S)
- Matches: 72
- Goals: 332 (4.61 per match)
- Top goalscorer: (Japan) Ruriko Takashima (29 goals)
- Biggest home win: Albirex (S) 13–0 Balestier (10 September 2025)
- Biggest away win: Balestier 0–14 LCS (24 May 2025)
- Highest scoring: Balestier 0–14 LCS (24 May 2025)

The 2025 Women's Premier League was the 24th season of the Women's Premier League in Singapore. The season began on 1 March.

== Summary ==
Nine teams will be participating in the 2025 season. Deloitte is concluding its role as title sponsor of the WPL, but the competition prize pool remains unchanged. The 2025 league champions will be awarded S$25,000, while the first and second runners-up will receive S$10,000 and S$7,500 respectively. All the WPL's matches will be played at Choa Chu Kang Stadium.

== Exhibition match ==
The exhibition match is part of Brisbane Roar’s five-day tour of Singapore in April 2025. Organised in partnership with the FAS, the tour aims to strengthen community engagement and provide international exposure to support the continued growth of women’s football.

4 April 2025	WPL All-Stars	1–7	Brisbane Roar	Bishan Stadium
20:00 (GMT+8)	S. Sunisa 6'	Report	Popadinova 3', 20'; Levin 45+1', 61'; Brown 57'; Tan 71'; Pringle 85'	Attendance: 2,108

== Teams ==
A total of 9 teams competed in the league.

Team	Team list
Albirex Niigata (S)	2025
Balestier Khalsa	
Hougang United	
Geylang International	
Lion City Sailors	2025
Still Aerion WFC	2025
BG Tampines Rovers	
Tanjong Pagar United	
Tiong Bahru FC	

== Foreign players ==
All teams may register a maximum of four foreign players with a minimum age of sixteen and above at the point of registration. Players name in bold indicates the player was registered during the mid-season transfer window.

Team	Player 1	Player 2	Player 3	Player 4	Former players
Albirex Niigata (S)	(Japan) Kana Kitahara	(Japan) Manami Fukuzawa	(Japan) Ruriko Takashima	(China) Vanessa Han	
Balestier Khalsa	(Australia) Lyla Wines-Winch	(Malaysia) Hannah Teo	(Philippines) Anica Danielle Alde Cabuay		(France) Laura Rivellini
Geylang International	(Australia) Olliana Davies	(Russia) Victoria Novoselov	(England) Jenna Durell	(Wales) **Lauren Reese**	
Hougang United	(Canada) Sydney Hector	(Philippines) Riddle Reneelyn Sison			
Lion City Sailors	(India) Anaya Sehgal	(Malaysia) Putri Alyiah Seow			(France) Priscille Le Helloco (Canada) Madison Telmer
Still Aerion	(Cambodia) **Yon Yoeurn**	(Thailand) **Jaruwan Chaiyarak**	(Thailand) Sunisa Srangthaisong	(Thailand) **Thanaporn Yimlamai**	(Malaysia) Puteri Alisa Wilkinson (Wales) Lauren Reese (Mexico) Andrea Moska
Tampines Rovers	(Australia) Isabella Rose Edwards	(Japan) Mio Irisawa	(India) **Ananya Pande**		(Australia) Ruby Alexandra Brooks (France) Lucie Lefebvre
Tanjong Pagar United	(Australia) Yasmine Kennedy	(Japan) Ayaka Miki	(Malaysia) Nadirah Nur Syairah		
Tiong Bahru					

== League table ==
Pos	Team	Pld	W	D	L	GF	GA	GD	Pts	Qualification or relegation
1	Albirex Niigata (S) (C)	16	15	0	1	91	6	+85	45	Qualification for AFC Champions League
2	Still Aerion	16	12	2	2	57	21	+36	38	
3	Lion City Sailors	16	11	3	2	76	10	+66	36	
4	Geylang International	16	9	2	5	40	23	+17	29	
5	Hougang United	16	6	2	8	17	28	−11	20	
6	Tanjong Pagar United	16	4	0	12	11	43	−32	12	
7	Tiong Bahru	16	4	0	12	13	47	−34	12	
8	BG Tampines Rovers	16	3	2	11	17	57	−40	11	
9	Balestier Khalsa	16	2	1	13	11	98	−87	7	

Updated to match(es) played on 12 Oct 2025. Source: Women's Premier League
Rules for classification: 1) points; 2) goal difference; 3) number of goals scored; 4) number of wins
(C) League champions

== Fixtures and results ==
Home \ Away	ALB	BAL	GEY	HOU	LCS	STI	TAM	TIB	TPU
Albirex Niigata (S)		13–0	1–0	4–0	1–2	7–2	7–0	7–0	5–0
Balestier Khalsa	1–10		1–8	1–5	0–14	0–6	1–1	1–4	0–4
Geylang International	1–3	6–0		6–0	1–1	1–4	3–0	3–0	2–0
Hougang United	0–4	4–0	1–1		0–2	0–1	1–0	0–1	1–0
Lion City Sailors	0–1	9–0	8–0	0–0		2–2	12–0	6–0	1–0
Still Aerion	0–5	10–0	3–0	4–0	3–2		2–2	1–0	1–0
BG Tampines Rovers	0–7	1–3	0–1	2–3	2–9	1–4		2–0	1–0
Tiong Bahru	0–9	3–1	1–5	0–1	0–1	1–7	1–2		2–0
Tanjong Pagar United	0–7	1–2	1–3	2–1	0–7	0–7	0–3	1–0	

Updated to match(es) played on 12 Oct 2025. Source: Football Association of Singapore
Legend: Blue = home team win; Yellow = draw; Red = away team win.

== Statistics ==
=== Top scorers ===
As of 5 Oct 2025

Rank	Player	Team	Jersey number	Goals
1	(Japan) Ruriko Takashima	Albirex Niigata (S)	18	30
2	(Singapore) Farah Nurzahirah	Geylang International / Lion City Sailors	10 / 10 (Note: 11 for Geylang, 13 for LCS)	24
3	(Japan) Kana Kitahara	Albirex Niigata (S)	14	21
4	(Japan) Manami Fukuzawa	Albirex Niigata (S)	9	16
4	(Thailand) Sunisa Srangthaisong	Still Aerion	11	16
5	(Singapore) Sarah Zu’risqha Zul’kepli	Lion City Sailors	23	11
6	(Singapore) Siti Wan Nabilah	Albirex Niigata (S)	25	8
6	(Cambodia) Yon Yoeurn	Still Aerion	8	8
7	(Malaysia) (Netherlands) Putri Alyiah Seow	Lion City Sailors	28	7
8	(Singapore) Sitianiwati Rosielin	Albirex Niigata (S)	8	6
8	(Singapore) Raeka Ee Pei Ying	Lion City Sailors	9	6
8	(Singapore) Farhanah Ruhaizat	Geylang International	22	6
8	(Singapore) Nasriah Ibrahim	Hougang United / Geylang International	9 / 10 (Note: 1 for Hougang, 5 for Geylang)	6
8	(Singapore) (France) Lila Tan	Still Aerion	3	6
9	(Singapore) Sharifah Aamanina	Balestier Khalsa	12	5
9	(Thailand) Jaruwan Chaiyarak	Still Aerion	10	5
9	(Singapore) Lim Li Xian	Tiong Bahru FC	10	5
10	(Singapore) Nurzaherra Maisarah	Albirex Niigata (S)	10	4
10	(Canada) Madison Telmer	Lion City Sailors	2	4
10	(Singapore) Chloe Koh Ke Ying	Geylang International	9	4
10	(Philippines) Riddle Reneelyn Sison	Hougang United	27	4
10	(Singapore) Syazwani Ruzi	Lion City Sailors	8	4
10	(Singapore) Dhaniyah Qasimah	Lion City Sailors	77	4
10	(Singapore) Nurul Unaisah	Still Aerion	19	4
11	(Singapore) Nahwah Aidilreza	BG Tampines Rovers	10	3
11	(Singapore) Sharifah Amira	BG Tampines Rovers	14	3
11	(Australia) Ruby Alexandra Brooks	BG Tampines Rovers	20	3
11	(Singapore) Seri Nurinsyirah	Lion City Sailors	6	3
11	(Singapore) Nur Umairah	Lion City Sailors	4	3
11	(Singapore) Yuvika Suresh	Lion City Sailors	19	3
11	(Singapore) Dorcas Chu	Lion City Sailors	20	3
11	(Singapore) Nor Adriana Lim	Lion City Sailors	25	3
11	(Singapore) Huraizah Ismail	Still Aerion	16	3
11	(Singapore) Afiqah Omar	Still Aerion	23	3
12	(Singapore) Izyani Ghani	Albirex Niigata (S)	27	2
12	(Singapore) Rosnani Azman	Albirex Niigata (S)	99	2
12	(Singapore) Dinah Sajidah	Balestier Khalsa	24	2
12	(Singapore) Anna Seng	BG Tampines Rovers	19	2
12	(Japan) Mio Irisawa	BG Tampines Rovers	28	2
12	(Singapore) Elyssa Qistina	Geylang International	12	2
12	(Australia) Olliana Davies	Geylang International	13	2
12	(Singapore) (Sweden) Svea Nadia Hertzman	Geylang International	21	2
12	(Singapore) Claire Marie Tay	Hougang United	12	2
12	(Canada) Sydney Hector	Hougang United	16	2
12	(Singapore) Nur Syafina Putri	Hougang United	29	2
12	(Singapore) Nurhidayu Naszri	Lion City Sailors	24	2
12	(Malaysia) Puteri Alisa Wilkinson	Still Aerion	9	2
12	(Wales) Lauren Reese	Still Aerion / Geylang International	10 / 11 (Note: 1 for Geylang, 1 for Aerion)	2
12	(Singapore) Joie Teo	Tanjong Pagar United	13	2
12	(Singapore) Lee Lai Kuan	Tiong Bahru FC	6	2
13	(Singapore) Janet Tan	Albirex Niigata (S) / Still Aerion	15 / 5 (Note: 0 for Albirex, 1 for Aerion)	1
13	(China) Vanessa Han	Albirex Niigata (S)	22	1
13	(Malaysia) Hannah Teo	Balestier Khalsa	10	1
13	(Singapore) Nur Fitrizah	BG Tampines Rovers	9	1
13	(Singapore) Darvina Halini	BG Tampines Rovers	11	1
13	(Singapore) Syakirah Jumain	BG Tampines Rovers	12	1
13	(Singapore) Fathimah Syaakirah	BG Tampines Rovers	21	1
13	(Singapore) Saranya Thiru	Geylang International	5	1
13	(Singapore) Nadhra Aqilah	Geylang International	7	1
13	(Singapore) (England) Kyra Taylor	Geylang International	14	1
13	(Singapore) Hamizah Talib	Geylang International	15	1
13	(Singapore) Wan Nashirah Mohammed	Geylang International / Lion City Sailors	17 / 90 (Note: 0 for Geylang, 1 for LCS)	1
13	(Russia) Victoria Novoselov	Geylang International	18	1
13	(Singapore) Alysha Nasrina	Geylang International	23	1
13	(Singapore) Raudhah Kamis	Hougang United	4	1
13	(Singapore) Jaslyn Leong Fei Ping	Hougang United	5	1
13	(Singapore) Nisreen Aziz	Hougang United	14	1
13	(Singapore) Adrianna Hazeri	Hougang United	23	1
13	(Singapore) Nicole Lim	Hougang United	26	1
13	(France) Priscille Le Helloco	Lion City Sailors	10	1
13	(Singapore) Liyana Indah Rickit	Lion City Sailors	11	1
13	(India) Anaya Sehgal	Lion City Sailors	12	1
13	(Singapore) Qarissa Putri	Lion City Sailors	15	1
13	(Singapore) Tyan Foong	Lion City Sailors	76	1
13	(Singapore) Fonda Chai	Still Aerion	6	1
13	(Thailand) Thanaporn Yimlamai	Still Aerion	9	1
13	(Singapore) Noralinda	Still Aerion	24	1
13	(Japan) Miki Ayaka	Tanjong Pagar United	9	1
13	(Singapore) Nuriah Noor	Tanjong Pagar United	10	1
13	(Singapore) Anupriya Subramanian	Tanjong Pagar United	11	1
13	(Singapore) Nor Shakira Allysa	Tanjong Pagar United	19	1
13	(Singapore) Madeleine Lim	Tanjong Pagar United	21	1
13	(Singapore) Celine Koh	Tiong Bahru FC	5	1
13	(Singapore) Lee Lai Kuan	Tiong Bahru FC	6	1
13	(Singapore) Christine Gan	Tiong Bahru FC	12	1

Source: Women's Premier League

=== Own goals ===
As of 24 Sept 2025

Player	For	Against	Date
(Singapore) Nur Iffah (#6)	BG Tampines Rovers	Still Aerion	2 March
(Singapore) Claire Merrow-Smith	Hougang United	Balestier Khalsa	27 July
(Singapore) Crystal Wu (#15)	Tanjong Pagar United	Still Aerion	20 August
(Singapore) Crystal Wu (#15)	Tanjong Pagar United	Geylang International	23 August
(Singapore) Nur Umairah (#4)	Lion City Sailors	Still Aerion	17 Sept
(Singapore) Angelyn Pang (#3)	Hougang United	Albirex Niigata (S)	24 Sept
(Singapore) Afiqah Omar (#23)	Still Aerion	Lion City Sailors	28 Sept

== Awards ==
The FAS hosted the Amateur Leagues Awards Night Season 2025 on Friday, 17 January 2026, at the Raffles Town Club. The annual event honours the outstanding individuals from the Singapore Football League (SFL 1 and 2), Women’s Premier League (WPL), and Women’s National League (WNL).

Award	Nominee	Club	Recipient
Player of the Year	(Japan) Ruriko Takashima	Albirex Niigata (S)	Ruriko Takashima
Player of the Year	(Singapore) Farhanah Ruhaizat	Geylang International	Ruriko Takashima
Player of the Year	(Thailand) Sunisa Srangthaisong	Still Aerion	Ruriko Takashima
Young Player of the Year	(Singapore) Sarah Zu’risqha	Lion City Sailors	Sarah Zu’risqha
Young Player of the Year	(Singapore) Sharifah Nur Amanina	Balestier Khalsa	Sarah Zu’risqha
Young Player of the Year	(Singapore) Nasriah Ibrahim	Hougang United/ Geylang International	Sarah Zu’risqha
Coach of the Year	(Singapore) Jeremy Chiang	Still Aerion	Jeremy Chiang
Coach of the Year	(Singapore) Sivaraj Geevananthan	Hougang United	Jeremy Chiang
Coach of the Year	(Japan) Kana Kitahara	Albirex Niigata (S)	Jeremy Chiang
Goal of the Year	(Singapore) (England) Kyra Taylor (vs Hougang United, 18 May 2025)	Geylang International	Kyra Taylor
Goal of the Year	(Thailand) Sunisa Srangthaisong (vs Tanjong Pagar United, 20 Aug 2025)	Still Aerion	Kyra Taylor
Goal of the Year	(Singapore) Sharifah Nur Amanina (vs Tanjong Pagar United, 17 May 2025)	Balestier Khalsa	Kyra Taylor
Golden Boot	(Japan) Ruriko Takashima (Albirex Niigata (S))		
Golden Glove	(Singapore) Lutfiah Hannah (Still Aerion)		
Fair Play Award	Albirex Niigata (S), Hougang United, Tiong Bahru		

Source: fas.org.sg
