= FC Jurong (women) =

Jurong
- Full name: Football Club Jurong
- Nickname: The Swans
- Short name: FCJ, JRG
- Founded: 2022; 4 years ago (as Albirex Niigata Ladies Singapore)
- Ground: Jurong East Stadium
- Capacity: 2,700
- Chairman: Daisuke Korenaga
- Head coach: Kana Kitahara
- League: Women's Premier League
- 2025: Women's Premier League, 1st of 9 (champions)
- Website: www.fcjurong.com
Home colours	Away colours

Football Club Jurong is the women's professional football club that plays in the Women's Premier League of Singapore.

== History ==
FC Jurong started as the satellite team of Japanese club Albirex Niigata Ladies. The establishment of a women's football team was announced on 3 May 2022. The Albirex Niigata Singapore women's team joined the Women's Premier League (WPL), debuting in the 2022 season. Albirex Niigata (S) won their inaugural WPL title in the 2025 season, led by player-coach Kana Kitahara.

On 27 November 2025, Albirex Niigata (S) announced that the club will be changing its name to Albirex Jurong Football Club, and also their club crest. The women's team was ahead of adopting the new identity, effectively from 1 January 2026.

As the 2025 domestic champions, the club took part in their first ever AFC Women's Champions League in the 2026–27 edition. The club changed their name again to FC Jurong upon entry to the tournament.

== Continental record ==
Season	Competition	Round	Opponent	Result
2026–27	AFC Women's Champions League	Preliminary stage	(Myanmar) Ayeyawady	0–4
2026–27	AFC Women's Champions League	Preliminary stage	(Chinese Taipei) New Taipei City Hang Yuan	1–2
2026–27	AFC Women's Champions League	Preliminary stage	(Lebanon) No Limits	2–1

== Coaching history ==
- (Singapore) Nahar Daud (2022–2023)
- (Japan) Kana Kitahara (2024–present)
