= Sakurako Ohashi =

Japanese footballer

Personal information
- Date of birth: 8 April 2004
- Place of birth: Shizuoka Prefecture, Japan
- Position: Defender

Team information
- Current team: Chifure AS Elfen Saitama
- Number: 35

Youth career
- Fujikawa First Ladies

College career
Years	Team	Apps	(Gls)
- Toyo University

Senior career*
Years	Team	Apps	(Gls)
- Lion City Sailors Women

International career
2026–	Japan		
Medal record
Representing Japan
Asian Games
Gold medal – first place	2026 Aichi-Nagoya	Women's football
- * Club domestic league appearances and goals

Sakurako Ohashi (Japanese: 大箸 桜子, born 8 April 2004) is a Japanese footballer who plays as a defender. She has represented the Japan women's national football team and plays for Toyo University while being registered as a specially designated player with Chifure AS Elfen Saitama. She was part of Japan's gold medal-winning team at the 2026 Asian Games.

== Career ==
Ohashi was born in Shizuoka Prefecture, Japan. She played youth football for Fujikawa First Ladies before joining the girls' football teams at Tokoha University Tachibana Junior High School and Tokoha University Tachibana High School. She subsequently joined the women's football team at Toyo University and also played for Lion City Sailors Women in Singapore.

In July 2026, the Japan Football Association designated Ohashi as a special player for the 2026–27 WE League season. The designation enabled her to remain registered with Toyo University while being eligible to play official matches for Chifure AS Elfen Saitama.

Ohashi was selected for Japan's squad for the women's football tournament at the 2026 Asian Games in Aichi-Nagoya. She made her first start of the tournament in the final against North Korea on 2 October 2026. Japan drew 2–2 after extra time and won the penalty shoot-out 5–3 to claim its third consecutive Asian Games gold medal.
