= Kana Kitahara =

Japanese footballer

Kana Kitahara 北原 佳奈
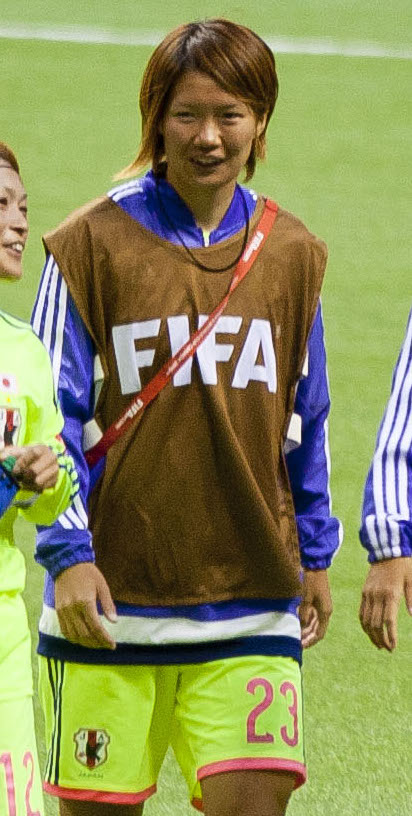
- Kitahara at the 2015 World Cup

Personal information
- Full name: Kana Kitahara
- Date of birth: December 17, 1988 (age 37)
- Place of birth: Fujieda, Shizuoka, Japan
- Height: 1.73 m (5 ft 8 in)
- Position: Defender

Team information
- Current team: Albirex Jurong
- Number: 14

Youth career
- 2004–2006: Fujieda Junshin High School
- 2007–2010: Kanto Gakuen University

Senior career*
Years	Team	Apps	(Gls)
2011–2015	Albirex Niigata	93	(5)
2016–2022	Mynavi Sendai	45	(2)
2023–	Albirex Jurong		

International career
2013–2015	Japan	9	(0)

Managerial career
- 2024–: Albirex Niigata (S)
Medal record
Albirex Niigata
Runner-up	Empress's Cup	2011
Runner-up	Empress's Cup	2013
Runner-up	Empress's Cup	2015
Representing Japan
FIFA Women's World Cup
Silver medal – second place	2015 Canada
Asian Games
Silver medal – second place	2014 Incheon	Team
AFC U-19 Women's Championship
Silver medal – second place	2007 China
- * Club domestic league appearances and goals

Kana Kitahara (北原 佳奈, Kitahara Kana; born December 17, 1988) is a Japanese women's professional footballer who plays as defender. She has also played for the Japan national team. Kitahara is currently the player-coach for Albirex Jurong.

== Early life and education ==
Kitahara was born in Fujieda on December 17, 1988. She graduated from Kanto Gakuen University.

== Playing career ==
=== Club career ===
Kitahara joined Albirex Niigata in 2011. She played 93 games in L.League.

In 2016, she moved to Mynavi Vegalta Sendai.

In July 2022, Kitahara joined the Albirex Niigata Singapore of the Women's Premier League.

In 2023, Kitahara scored 17 goals in 13 matches for Albirex Niigata, where the team finished runner-up for the 2023 Women's Premier League.

Now a playing-coach, Kitahara helped Albirex Niigata won their inaugural WPL title in the 2025 season. She remained with the team for the following season, which renamed themselves as Albirex Jurong.

=== International career ===
On September 22, 2013, Kitahara debuted for the Japan national team against Nigeria. In 2014, she played at the 2014 Asian Games and Japan won second place. She was also played in the 2015 World Cup, in which Japan won second place. She played nine games for Japan until 2015.

== Coaching career ==
Kitahara has a Japan Football Association B Licence.

While playing for Albirex Niigata, Kitahara was also the assistant coach of the U-17 Albirex men’s team. She was also a coach of the Albirex Singapore Football Academy.

In 2024, Kitahara became the head coach for Albirex Niigata Singapore Ladies team, taking over from Nahar Daud.

== National team statistics ==
Japan national team
Year	Apps	Goals
2013	1	0
2014	6	0
2015	2	0
Total	9	0

== Honours ==
Individual

- Women’s Premier League Player of the Year: 2023
- Women’s Premier League Golden Boot: 2023
