= 2022 Women's Premier League (Singapore) =

21st season of the Singapore Women's Premier League

Women's Premier League (Singapore)
- Season: 2022
- Dates: 28 May 2022 - 2 Oct 2022
- Champions: Lion City Sailors
- Matches: 42
- Goals: 135 (3.21 per match)
- Top goalscorer: Izzati Rosni (LCS) (10 goals)
- Biggest home win: Lion City Sailors 6–0 Hougang Utd (18 June 2022)
- Biggest away win: Hougang Utd 0–6 Lion City Sailors (27 August 2022)
- Total attendance: 4,098
- Average attendance: 98

The 2022 Women's Premier League (also known as the Deloitte Women's Premier League due to sponsorship reasons with audit firm Deloitte) is the top-flight women's football league in Singapore. The 21st season commenced on Saturday, 28 May 2022.

Deloitte Singapore became the first title sponsor for Singapore's top-flight women's football league since its launch in August 2000. The league returns after a two-year pandemic-enforced absence and will feature seven clubs in its 21st season. All matches will be held at the Yishun Stadium with free admission.

The league champions will receive S$25,000, while the second and third placed teams will receive S$10,000 and S$7,500 respectively.

Lion City Sailors secured the 2022 Deloitte Women's Premier League title off the back of an unbeaten run with two matches left.

== New teams ==
Albirex Niigata (S) announced on 3 May 2022 that a new women's team was established and will compete in the Women's Premier League.

Hougang United are also making their debut, banding together with players from Middle Rangers FC and adding fresh players from the National University of Singapore.

Lion City Sailors will also be playing in Premier League for the first time under its new name after being privatised in 2020.

== Teams ==
A total of 7 teams competed in the league.

| Team | Team List |
|---|---|
| Albirex Niigata (S) | 2022 |
| Balestier Khalsa | 2022 |
| Hougang United | 2022 |
| Lion City Sailors | 2022 |
| Still Aerion Women's | |
| Tanjong Pagar United | 2022 |
| Tiong Bahru | |

== Results ==
=== League table ===
| Pos | Team | Pld | W | D | L | GF | GA | GD | Pts |
|---|---|---|---|---|---|---|---|---|---|
| 1 | Lion City Sailors (C) | 12 | 10 | 2 | 0 | 39 | 3 | +36 | 32 |
| 2 | Albirex Niigata (S) | 12 | 8 | 1 | 3 | 31 | 16 | +15 | 25 |
| 3 | Tanjong Pagar United | 12 | 7 | 2 | 3 | 24 | 11 | +13 | 23 |
| 4 | Tiong Bahru | 12 | 4 | 3 | 5 | 15 | 12 | +3 | 15 |
| 5 | Balestier Khalsa | 12 | 2 | 5 | 5 | 7 | 19 | −12 | 11 |
| 6 | Still Aerion | 12 | 3 | 1 | 8 | 11 | 29 | −18 | 10 |
| 7 | Hougang United | 12 | 0 | 2 | 10 | 8 | 45 | −37 | 2 |

Source: Women's Premier League
Rules for classification: 1) points; 2) goal difference; 3) number of goals scored; 4) number of wins
(C) Champions

=== Fixtures and results ===
The league operates on a home and away round-robin format from 28 May to 2 October 2023.

| Home \ Away | ALB | BAL | HOU | LCS | STI | TBR | TPU |
|---|---|---|---|---|---|---|---|
| Albirex Niigata (S) | | 1–1 | 4–1 | 0–4 | 5–1 | 3–0 | 1–2 |
| Balestier Khalsa | 0–3 | | 0–0 | 0–4 | 2–1 | 0–0 | 0–0 |
| Hougang United | 1–5 | 1–4 | | 0–6 | 0–4 | 1–2 | 1–4 |
| Lion City Sailors | 4–1 | 3–0 | 6–0 | | 4–0 | 2–1 | 2–1 |
| Still Aerion | 0–4 | 1–0 | 1–1 | 0–4 | | 0–1 | 0–2 |
| Tiong Bahru | 1–2 | 0–0 | 0–0 | 0–1 | 5–0 | | 1–2 |
| Tanjong Pagar United | 1–2 | 5–0 | 5–1 | 0–0 | 1–3 | 1–0 | |

Source: Football Association of Singapore
Legend: Blue = home team win; Yellow = draw; Red = away team win.
For upcoming matches, an "a" indicates there is an article about the rivalry between the two participants.

== Awards ==
=== FAS Awards Night 2022 ===
Outstanding individuals from the 2022 domestic season were recognised at the Football Association of Singapore (FAS) Awards Night 2022 held on 8 November 2022 at Orchard Hotel.

| Awards | Nominated Player | Club |
|---|---|---|
| Deloitte Player of the year | Izzati Rosni | Lion City Sailors |
| Deloitte Player of the year | Haziqah Haszman | Tanjong Pagar United |
| Deloitte Player of the year | **Manami Fukuzawa** | **Tanjong Pagar United** |
| Young Player of the Year | **Haziqah Haszman** | **Tanjong Pagar United** |
| Young Player of the Year | Dhaniyah Qasimah | Hougang United |
| Young Player of the Year | Dorcas Chu | Lion City Sailors |
| Coach of the Year | **Yeong Sheau Shyan** | **Lion City Sailors** |
| Coach of the Year | Nahar Daud | Tanjong Pagar United |
| Coach of the Year | Samawira Basri | Tanjong Pagar United |
| Goal of the Year | Nur Emilia Natasha | Albirex Niigata FC (S) |
| Goal of the Year | **Izzati Rosni** | **Lion City Sailors** |
| Goal of the Year | Stephanie Dominguez | Still Aerion |
| Top Scorer | **Izzati Rosni** | **Lion City Sailors** |
| Golden Globe Award | **Beatrice Tan** | **Lion City Sailors** |

Note: Winners are in bold.
