= Women's Premier League (Singapore) =

Association football league in Singapore

- Organising body: Football Association of Singapore (FAS)
- Founded: August 2000; 26 years ago
- Country: Singapore
- Confederation: AFC
- Number of clubs: 9
- Level on pyramid: 1
- Relegation to: Women's National League
- International cup: AFC Women's Champions League
- Current champions: Jurong (1st title)
- Most championships: Tampines Rovers; Warriors (4 titles each)
- Top scorer: (Japan) Kana Kitahara (65 goals)
- Website: fas.org.sg
- Current: 2026 Women's Premier League

The Women's Premier League (WPL) is the top-flight women's football league in Singapore. It is run by the Football Association of Singapore (FAS) and features nine teams.

== History ==
The WPL started in August 2000. In 2004, in a similar move to S.League, the WPL invited a foreign team to join the league. Guangzhou Sunray Cave from China joined the WPL.

FAS announced that the league will be reorganised to form a two-division structure from 2017. The 2017 Women’s Premier League consisted of the teams that finished in the top six of the 2016 edition, while the new Women’s National League (WNL) was made up of teams that finished in the 7th-11th positions, along with any new teams. The champions of WNL 2017 will be promoted to WPL 2018, while the last placed team of WPL will be relegated to WNL. The second-last placed team of the WPL will play against the runners-up of the WNL in a playoff.

In 2019, the WPL had 10 teams. During the COVID-19 pandemic in Singapore, the WPL was suspended. On 28 May 2022 , the WPL resumed competition.

On 21 February 2025, the A-League Women’s team Brisbane Roar announced that they will embark its first-ever overseas tour to Singapore, under partnership with FAS. During this five-day tour, they conducted junior football clinics, community engagement events, as well as an exhibition match against the best of the WPL.

== Sponsorship ==
On 4 May 2022, Deloitte became the title sponsor for the WPL for three years, renaming the league as the Deloitte Women's Premier League. The three-year sponsorship deal includes more than $300,000, with the prize money for the champion increased to $25,000.

== Former clubs ==
- Bishan Arsenal
- Young Women
- Redhill Rangers
- Paya Lebar Punggol
- Ang Mo Kio United
- Middle Rangers
- Eunos Crescent
- GFA Sporting Westlake
- Warriors
- Woodlands Wellington
- Police Sports Association

=== Invited teams ===
- Guangzhou Sunray Cave
- Borussia Zamrud

== Players ==
The minimum age of players has been 16. The foreign player quota is four per team. Teams need to register a minimum of 18 and a maximum of 25 players.

== Past winners ==
Season	Winners	Runners-up	Ref
2000	Tampines Rovers	Singapore American School	
2001	Tampines Rovers (2)	Home United	
2002	Tampines Rovers (3)	Home United	
2003	Tampines Rovers (4)	Home United	
2004	Guangzhou Sunray Cave	Home United	
2005	Paya Lebar Punggol	Bishan Arsenal	
2006	Young Women (Note: National Under-23 players)	Paya Lebar Punggol	
2007	Bishan Arsenal	Young Women	.
2008	Young Women (2)	Arion (Note: Currently known as Still Aerion)	
2009	Sengkang Punggol (Note: Sengkang Punggol was a merger between Paya Lebar-Punggol and Sengkang Marine. Currently known as Hougang United) (2)	Middle Rangers	
2010	Ang Mo Kio United (Note: Formerly known as Bishan Arsenal) (2)	Middle Rangers	
2011	Borussia Zamrud	Police SA	
2012	Tanjong Pagar United	Middle Rangers	
2013	Middle Rangers	Young Women	
2014	Eunos Crescent	Police SA	
2015	GFA Sporting Westlake	Police SA	
2016	Warriors	Arion FA	
2017	Warriors (2)	Woodlands Wellington	
2018	Warriors (3)	Woodlands Wellington	
2019	Warriors (4)	Home United	
2020	Competition not held due to Covid-19 Pandemic		
2021	Competition not held due to Covid-19 Pandemic		
2022	Lion City Sailors (Note: Formerly known as Home United)	Albirex Niigata (S)	
2023	Lion City Sailors (2)	Albirex Niigata (S)	
2024	Lion City Sailors (3)	Albirex Niigata (S)	
2025	Albirex Niigata (S)	Still Aerion	
2026	Lion City Sailors (4)	Albirex Jurong (Note: Formerly known as Albirex Niigata (S))	

== Performance by clubs ==
Club	Winners	Runners-up	Winning years
Warriors	4	0	2016, 2017, 2018, 2019
Tampines Rovers	4	0	2000, 2001, 2002, 2003
Lion City Sailors	3	5	2022, 2023, 2024
Young Women	2	2	2006, 2008
Ang Mo Kio United	2	1	2007, 2010
Hougang United (Note: Formerly known as Sengkang Punggol)	2	1	2005, 2009
Albirex Jurong (Note: Formerly known as Albirex Niigata (S))	1	3	2025
Middle Rangers	1	3	2013
GFA Sporting Westlake	1	0	2015
Eunos Crescent	1	0	2014
Tanjong Pagar United	1	0	2012
Borussia Zamrud	1	0	2011
Guangzhou Sunray Cave	1	0	2004
Police SA	0	3	
Woodlands Wellington	0	2	
Still Aerion (Note: Formerly known as Arion WFC)	0	2	
Singapore American School	0	1	

== All Stars Game ==
The inaugural Women's Premier League All Stars Game was held on 4 April 2025 at Bishan Stadium against Australian A-League Women side Brisbane Roar. Brisbane Roar won the match 7–1, with one of their seven goals coming from Singaporean international Danelle Tan.
