= 2023 Aerion Women's FC season =

Aerion WFC
2023 season
- Chairman: Simon Tan
- Head coach: Still Aerion: Chris Yip-Au; Royal Arion: Simon Carden; Iskandar Abdul Latiff
- Premier League: 7th (Still Aerion)
- National League: Champions (Royal Arion)
- Top goalscorer: WPL: Mira (6); WNL: Orapin W. (35)

The 2023 season will mark Still Aerion WFC's 14th season playing in the top flight of Singapore's women football, Women's Premier League (WPL).

Royal Arion WFC will be playing in the Women's National League (WNL). Royal Arion became the fifth winner in as many editions of the WNL by winning the 2023 FAS Women's National League champions. Orapin's stunning 35-goal tally secured her the title of the top scorer.

== Squad ==
=== Still Aerion WFC ===
Note: Position of the players may not be accurate as the club did not include the players' position in their roster for the season.

Squad No.	Name	Nationality	Date of birth (age)	Previous club	Contract since	Contract end
Goalkeeper
1	Nurul Faizah Binte Ramle	(Singapore)	7 June 2000 (age 26)		2020	2023
18	Pamela Kong Zi En	(Singapore)	5 August 1991 (age 34)		2017	2023
Defender
2	Nur Farah Amirah Fauder	(Singapore)			2022	2023
3	Yeong Siew Mei	(Singapore)		(Singapore) Hougang United	2023	2023
4	Arienne Monteclar				2023	2023
6	Fonda Chai	(Singapore)			2017	2023
16	Foo Shini	(Singapore)		(Singapore) Hougang United	2023	2023
19	Deanna Lim	(Singapore)	6 January 2001 (age 25)	(Singapore) Hougang United	2023	2023
24	Jasmine Kua	(Singapore)		(Singapore) Hougang United	2023	2023
26	Rachel Liew	(Singapore)		(Singapore) Royal Arion	2023	2023
28	Abigail Goh	(Singapore)			2023	2023
29	Janine Lim	(Singapore)		(Singapore) Royal Arion	2023	2023
Midfielder
7	Carmen Calisto	(England)		(Singapore) Royal Arion	2023	2023
8	Ariesa Zahran Binte Junaidi	(Singapore)			2023	2023
12	Sarah Chu Mun	(Singapore)			2023	2023
13	Annabel Mathilde Marx	(Germany)			2023	2023
14	Nurhannah Qistina	(Singapore)			2023	2023
15	Ayushi Anand	(Singapore)			2023	2023
17	Monessha Nair	(Singapore)		(Singapore) Tiong Bahru FC	2023	2023
20	Ho Yu Cheng	(Singapore)			2023	2023
22	Saranya Thiru	(Singapore)		(Singapore) Tiong Bahru FC	2023	2023
23	Nursafura	(Singapore)			2023	2023
25	Nur Humaira Ibrahim	(Singapore)		(Singapore) Royal Arion	2023	2023
Forwards
9	Claire Marie Tay	(Singapore)	14 January 2000 (age 26)		2022	2023
10	Mira Ruzana Seherzan	(Singapore)	6 January 2001 (age 25)		2023	2023
11	Nur Syakirah	(Singapore)			2022	2023
21	Larissa Anne Ortmann	(United States)			2022	2023
4	Chris Yip-Au Hew Seem	(Singapore)	5 April 1994 (age 32)		2020	2023
27	Wei Xuan	(Singapore)		(Singapore) Royal Arion	2023	2023

=== Royal Arion WFC ===
Source : theaerion.com

Squad No.	Name	Nationality	Date of birth (age)	Previous club	Contract since	Contract end
Goalkeeper
1	Waraporn Boonsing	(Thailand)		(Thailand) BG Bundit Asia	2023	2023
24	Yeoh Yi Ping	(Singapore)				2023
Defender
3	Ashely Chew	(Singapore)				2023
10	Sunisa Srangthaisong (Nancy)	(Thailand)	6 May 1988 (age 38)	(Thailand) BG Bundit Asia	2023	2023
12	Shafira Zailani	(Singapore)				2023
17	Mavis Lim (C)	(Singapore)				2023
18	Chloe Lim	(Singapore)			2019	2023
26	Nicole Niam	(Singapore)				2023
27	Nurul Lisa	(Singapore)				2023
29	Tan Yu Xuan	(Singapore)				2023
31	Alysa Sonia	(Singapore)				2023
Midfielder
4	Geraldine Eng	(Singapore)		(Singapore) Still Aerion	2019	2023
5	Natasha Lopez					2023
7	Pikul Khueanpet	(Thailand)	20 September 1988 (age 37)	(Thailand) BG Bundit Asia	2023	2023
9	Janelle Lee	(Singapore)				2023
11	Joyce Foo	(Singapore)				2023
15	Png Yu Ting	(Singapore)		(Singapore) Still Aerion	2023	2023
20	Esther Thang	(Singapore)				2023
22	Devina Beins					2023
23	Lauretta Cheng	(Singapore)				2023
Forwards
6	Orapin Waenngoen	(Thailand)	7 October 1995 (age 30)	(Thailand) BG Bundit Asia	2023	2023
8	Sherlyn Ng	(Singapore)			2019	2023
16	Tharshini Rajesegar	(Singapore)				2023
19	Marcela Nathan	(Singapore)				2023
21	Serena Bok	(Singapore)		(Singapore) Still Aerion	2023	2023

== Coaching staff ==
The following list displays the coaching staff of all the Aerion Women's FC current football sections:

Position	Name
President	Simon Tan
General Manager	
Team Manager (Still Aerion)	
Team Manager (Royal Arion)	
Head Coach (Still Aerion)	(Singapore) Chris Yip-Au
Head Coach (Royal Arion)	(Singapore) Iskandar Abdul Latiff (England) Simon Robert Carden
Team Doctor (Still Aerion)	(Singapore) Eileen Tay (The Orthopaedic Practice)

== Transfers ==
=== In ===
Pre-season

Position	Player	Transferred To	Transferred From
MF	(Germany) Annabel Mathilde Marx	(Singapore) Still Aerion	
DF	(Singapore) Deanna Lim	(Singapore) Still Aerion	(Singapore) Hougang United
DF	(Singapore) Foo Shini	(Singapore) Still Aerion	(Singapore) Hougang United
GK/DF	(Singapore) Jasmine Kua	(Singapore) Still Aerion	(Singapore) Hougang United
DF	(Singapore) Yew Siew Mei	(Singapore) Still Aerion	(Singapore) Hougang United
MF	(Singapore) Saranya Thiru	(Singapore) Still Aerion	(Singapore) Tiong Bahru FC
FW	(Singapore) Monessha Nair	(Singapore) Still Aerion	(Singapore) Tiong Bahru FC
DF	(Singapore) Janine Lim	(Singapore) Still Aerion	(Singapore) Royal Arion
MF	(Singapore) Carmen Calisto	(Singapore) Still Aerion	(Singapore) Royal Arion
GK	(Thailand) Waraporn Boonsing	(Singapore) Royal Arion	(Thailand) BG Bundit Asia
DF	(Thailand) Sunisa Srangthaisong	(Singapore) Royal Arion	(Thailand) BG Bundit Asia
MF	(Thailand) Pikul Khueanpet	(Singapore) Royal Arion	(Thailand) BG Bundit Asia
FW	(Thailand) Orapin Waenngoen	(Singapore) Royal Arion	(Thailand) BG Bundit Asia

Mid-season

Position	Player	Transferred To	Transferred From
DF	Abigail Goh	Still Aerion	Registered
DF	Rachel Liew	Still Aerion	Royal Aerion
MF	Nur Humaira Ibrahim	Still Aerion	Royal Aerion
FW	Wei Xuan	Still Aerion	Royal Aerion

Note: Still Aerion's updated roster were released on 4 September 2023 via Instagram.

=== Out ===
Preseason

Position	Player	Transferred From	Transferred To
GK	(Singapore) Lutfiah Hannah	(Singapore) Still Aerion	(Singapore) Tampines Rovers
DF	(Singapore) Nur Darwisyah Hadi	(Singapore) Still Aerion	(Singapore) Tampines Rovers
DF	(Singapore) Joie Tan	(Singapore) Still Aerion	(Singapore) Tanjong Pagar
MF	(Singapore) Nur Farhanah Ruhaizat	(Singapore) Still Aerion	(Singapore) Tampines Rovers
MF	(Singapore) Nur Afiqah Omar	(Singapore) Still Aerion	(Singapore) Tampines Rovers
FW	(Singapore) Stephanie Gigette Dominguez	(Singapore) Still Aerion	(Singapore) Tampines Rovers
DF	(India) Malavika Hemanth	(Singapore) Still Aerion	
	(Singapore) Geraldine	(Singapore) Still Aerion	
	(Singapore) Mavis	(Singapore) Still Aerion	
	(Singapore) Carolyn	(Singapore) Still Aerion	
	(Singapore) Serena	(Singapore) Still Aerion	
	(Singapore) Nuryn	(Singapore) Still Aerion	
	(Singapore) Juliana	(Singapore) Still Aerion	
FW	(Singapore) Regina Tan	(Singapore) Still Aerion	
	(Brazil) Jessica Rossette	(Singapore) Royal Arion	

Mid-season

Position	Player	Transferred From	Transferred To
	Arienne Monteclar	Still Aerion	Unregistered
	(Singapore) Nur Syakirah	Still Aerion	Unregistered
MF	(Singapore) Sarah Chu Mun	Still Aerion	Unregistered
	(Singapore) Ho Yu Cheng	Still Aerion	Unregistered

== Friendlies ==
=== Pre-season friendlies ===
Win Draw Loss

2 April 2023 1	Royal Arion	1-4	Eastern Thunder	Woodleigh
	Goal	Report	Amanina 11', 14'; Brittanie B. 37', 43'	Stadium: The Arena

== Team statistics ==
=== Appearances and goals (Still Aerion WFC) ===
Warning: The appearance of the squad members may not be accurate as neither the club or FAS produce the full playing list on their website.

As of 1 Dec 2023

No.	Pos.	Player	WPL		Total	
No.	Pos.	Player	Apps.	Goals	Apps.	Goals
1	GK	(Singapore) Nurul Faizah Binte Ramle	11	0	11	0
2	DF	(Singapore) Nur Farah Amirah Fauder	11	0	11	0
3	DF	(Singapore) Yeong Siew Mei	0+1	1	1	1
4	FW	(Singapore) Chris Yip-Au	1+1	1	2	1
6	DF	(Singapore) Fonda Chai	15	0	15	0
7	MF	(England) Carmen Calisto	14	4	14	4
8	MF	(Singapore) Ariesa Zahran Binte Junaidi	6	0	6	0
9	FW	(Singapore) Claire Marie Tay	7	0	7	0
10	DF	(Singapore) Mira Ruzana Sheeran	16	6	16	6
11		(Singapore) Nur Syakirah	0	0	0	0
12		(Singapore) Sarah Chu	0	0	0	0
13	MF	(Germany) Annabel Mathilde Marx	5	0	5	0
14	MF	(Singapore) NurHannah Qistina	0	0	0	0
15	MF	(Singapore) Ayushi Anand	1	0	1	0
16	DF	(Singapore) Foo Shini	10	0	10	0
17	MF	(Singapore) Monessha Nair	7+1	1	8	1
18	GK	(Singapore) Pamela Kong	4	0	4	0
19	DF	(Singapore) Deanna Lim	14	0	14	0
21	FW	(United States) Larissa Anne Orthmann	2	0	2	0
22	MF	(Singapore) Saranya Thiru	15	1	15	1
23	MF	(Singapore) Nursafura	10	1	10	1
24	DF	(Singapore) Jasmine Kua	1	0	1	0
25	MF	(Singapore) Nur Humaira Ibrahim	3	0	3	0
26	DF	(Singapore) Rachel Liew	8	0	8	0
27	FW	(Singapore) Wei Xuan	5	2	5	2
28	DF	(Singapore) Abigail Goh	4	0	4	0
29	DF	(Singapore) Janine Lim	10	4	10	4

=== Appearances and goals (Royal Arion WFC) ===
As of 16 Sept 2023

== Competition ==
=== Women's Premier League ===
Fixtures and results

Win Draw Loss

19 Mar 2023 1	Hougang United	3-0	Still Aerion	Choa Chu Kang
17:00 (GMT+8)	Raudhah; Nabilah			Stadium: Choa Chu Kang Stadium

25 Mar 2023 2	Still Aerion	0-3	Lion City Sailors	Choa Chu Kang
17:00 (GMT+8)		Report	Khairunnisa Khairol Anwar 18'; Nur Syazwani Ruzi 21'; Fatin Aqillah 51'	Stadium: Choa Chu Kang Stadium

21 May 2023 3	Police SA	1-0	Still Aerion	Choa Chu Kang
17:30 (GMT+8)				Stadium: Choa Chu Kang Stadium

28 May 2023 4	Tiong Bahru	0-2	Still Aerion	Choa Chu Kang
17:00 (GMT+8)			Mira Ruzana (pen.); Monessha	Stadium: Yishun Stadium

18 Jun 2023 5	Still Aerion	1-2	Tampines Rovers	Choa Chu Kang
19:30 (GMT+8)	Janine Lim		Nur Afiqah; Stephanie Dominguez	Stadium: Choa Chu Kang Stadium

24 Jun 2023 6	Tanjong Pagar Utd	2-3	Still Aerion	Choa Chu Kang
17:30 (GMT+8)	Manami Fukuzawa; Nur Faradila Rafidi		Carmen Calisto; Mira Ruzana; Yeong Siew Mei	Stadium: Choa Chu Kang Stadium

23 Jul 2023 7	Still Aerion	1-2	Albirex Niigata (S)	Choa Chu Kang
17:00 (GMT+8)	Janine Lim 27'	Report	Kana Kitahara 22'; Suriati Soony 88'	Stadium: Choa Chu Kang Stadium

30 Jul 2023 8	Balestier Khalsa	1-2	Still Aerion	Yishun
17:00 (GMT+8)			Wei Xuan; Chris Yip-Au	Stadium: Yishun Stadium

6 Aug 2023 9	Still Aerion	2-3	Geylang International	Yishun
17:00 (GMT+8)	Janine Lim; Mira Ruzana (pen.)		Laura Tatiana Zamri; Charlotte Chong	Stadium: Yishun Stadium

13 Aug 2023 10	Still Aerion	0-3	Hougang United	Choa Chu Kang
17:00 (GMT+8)				Stadium: Choa Chu Kang Stadium

19 Aug 2023 11	Lion City Sailors	1-0	Still Aerion	Choa Chu Kang
19:30 (GMT+8)	Josephine Ang 8'	Report		Stadium: Choa Chu Kang Stadium

27 Aug 2023 12	Still Aerion	1-1	Police SA	Choa Chu Kang
19:30 (GMT+8)	Nursafura 69'	Report	Sitianiwati 82' (pen.)	Stadium: Choa Chu Kang Stadium

14 Oct 2023 13	Still Aerion	3-1	Tiong Bahru	Choa Chu Kang
17:00 (GMT+8)	Clae 6' (o.g.); Rachel Liew 11'; Carmen Calisto 78'			Stadium: Choa Chu Kang Stadium; Player of the Match: Carmen Calisto

21 Oct 2023 14	Still Aerion	0-0	Tanjong Pagar	Choa Chu Kang
19:30 (GMT+8)				Stadium: Choa Chu Kang Stadium; Player of the Match: Nursafura

29 Oct 2023 15	Tampines Rover	0-1	Still Aerion	Choa Chu Kang
19:30 (GMT+8)			Carmen Calisto 3'	Stadium: Choa Chu Kang Stadium; Player of the Match: Nurul Faizah

5 Nov 2023 16	Albirex Niigata (S)	3-1	Still Aerion	Choa Chu Kang
17:00 (GMT+8)	Marina Asada 17', 81'; Nadhra Aqilah 90+1'	Report	Carmen Calisto 21'	Stadium: Choa Chu Kang Stadium

18 Nov 2023 17	Still Aerion	2-4	Balestier Khalsa	Choa Chu Kang
19:30 (GMT+8)	Mira Ruzana 3' (pen.); Saranya 8'	Report		Stadium: Choa Chu Kang Stadium

25 Nov 2023 18	Geylang International	0-3	Still Aerion	Tampines
19:30 (GMT+8)		Report	Janine Lim 2'; Mira Ruzana 25' (pen.), 39'	Stadium: Our Tampines Hub; Player of the Match: Claire Tay

League table

Pos	Team	Pld	W	D	L	GF	GA	GD	Pts	Qualification or relegation
1	Lion City Sailors (C)	18	17	1	0	73	2	+71	52	Qualification for 2024–25 AFC Women's Champions League
2	Albirex Niigata (S)	18	13	4	1	71	17	+54	43	
3	Hougang United	18	10	2	6	33	10	+23	32	
4	Tanjong Pagar United	18	9	4	5	51	14	+37	31	
5	Police SA	18	8	4	6	28	25	+3	28	
6	Balestier Khalsa	18	8	1	9	43	50	−7	25	
7	Still Aerion	18	6	2	10	22	30	−8	20	
8	Tampines Rovers	18	5	2	11	36	39	−3	17	
9	Geylang International	18	2	0	16	8	92	−84	6	
10	Tiong Bahru	18	2	0	16	11	97	−86	6	

Source: Women's Premier League
Rules for classification: 1) points; 2) goal difference; 3) number of goals scored; 4) number of wins
(C) Champions

=== Women's National League ===
(Played under the name of Royal Arion WFC)

==== Round Robin ====
League table

Pos	Team	Pld	W	D	L	GF	GA	GD	Pts
1	Royal Arion (Q)	7	7	0	0	49	0	+49	21
2	Admiralty FC (Q)	7	5	1	1	36	7	+29	16
3	Mattar Sailors (Q)	7	5	0	2	21	4	+17	15
4	Ayer Rajah Gryphons (Q)	7	4	0	3	7	17	−10	12
5	Singapore Khalsa Association	7	2	2	3	9	15	−6	8
6	Commonwealth Cosmos	7	2	1	4	8	23	−15	7
7	Bussorah Youths Sports Club	7	1	0	6	8	25	−17	3
8	Winchester Isla	7	0	0	7	2	49	−47	0

Updated to match(es) played on 1 October 2023. Source: FAS
Rules for classification: 1) points; 2) goal difference; 3) number of goals scored; 4) number of wins
(Q) Qualified for Semi-Final

Win Draw Loss

Fixtures and results (Round Robin)

20 Aug 2023 1	Bussorah Youths	0-13	Royal Arion	Toa Payoh
17:00 UTC+8	Wan Nabilah (red card)	Report	W. Orapin 19' (pen.), 28', 38', 42' (pen.), 58', 77', 78', 79'; Joyce F. 22'; K. Pikul 37', 90+1'; BYSC 66' (o.g.); S. Sunisa 83' (pen.)	Stadium: Toa Payoh Stadium; Player of the Match: Orapin Waenngoen

27 Aug 2023 2	Royal Arion	14-0	Commonwealth	Toa Payoh
17:00 UTC+8	W. Orapin 9', 10', 22', 33', 45+2', 62', 65', 69', 90'; Tharsh 46'; K. Pikul 5', 25', 43', 77'	Report		Stadium: Toa Payoh Stadium; Player of the Match: Orapin Waenngoen

3 Sep 2023 3	Mattar Sailors	0-1	Royal Arion	Yishun
19:30 UTC+8			K. Pikul 15'	Stadium: Yishun Stadium

10 Sep 2023 4	Winchester Isla	0-3	Royal Arion	Choa Chu Kang
17:00 UTC+8		Report	Serena B. 17', 25'; W. Orapin 79'	Stadium: Choa Chu Kang Stadium; Player of the Match: Orapin Waenngoen

17 Sep 2023 5	Royal Arion	7-0	Singapore Khalsa	Choa Chu Kang
19:30 UTC+8	W. Orapin 12', 37', 66', 68'; K. Pikul 61', 90'; S. Sunisa 56'	Report		Stadium: Choa Chu Kang Stadium

23 Sep 2023 6	Admiralty FC	0-6	Royal Arion	Choa Chu Kang
19:30 UTC+8		Report	W. Orapin 29', 36', 64', 84'; K. Pikul 77'; S. Sunisa 59'	Stadium: Choa Chu Kang Stadium; Player of the Match: Waraporn Boonsing

30 Sep 2023 7	Royal Arion	5-0	Ayer Rajah	Choa Chu Kang
17:00 UTC+8	K. Pikul 38'; B. Waraporn 56', 81'; W. Orapin 58'; S. Sunisa 90'			Stadium: Choa Chu Kang Stadium; Player of the Match: Waraporn Boonsing

==== Semi Final ====
7 Oct 2023 8	Royal Arion	10-0	Ayer Rajah	Choa Chu Kang
17:00 UTC+8	W. Orapin 2', 12', 27', 30', 71', 90+1'; Yu Ting 37'; S. Sunisa 56'; Janelle L. 82', 85'	Report		Stadium: Choa Chu Kang Stadium; Player of the Match: Orapin Waenngoen

==== Final ====
15 Oct 2023 9	Royal Arion (C)	2-1	Mattar Sailors	Woodlands
	Serena B. 67'; W. Orapin 70'	Report	Raeka E. 7'	Stadium: Woodlands Stadium; Attendance: 500

Note: (C) Champions

== See also ==
- 2019 Aerion Women's FC season
- 2020 Aerion Women's FC season
