= 2023 Women's National League (Singapore) =

Women's National League
- Season: 2023
- Dates: 19 Aug 2023 - 15 Oct 2023
- Champions: Royal Arion WFC
- Matches played: 32
- Goals scored: 161 (5.03 per match)
- Top goalscorer: W. Orapin (35 goals)
- Biggest home win: Admiralty 22-0 Winchester (15 August 2023)
- Biggest away win: Bussorah 0-13 Royal Arion (20 August 2023)
- Highest scoring: Admiralty 22-0 Winchester (15 August 2023)
- Longest winning run: 9 matches (Royal Arion)
- Longest unbeaten run: 9 matches (Royal Arion)
- Longest winless run: 7 matches (Winchester Isla)
- Longest losing run: 7 matches (Winchester Isla)
- All statistics correct as of 24 April 2024.

The 2023 Women's National League is the 5th season of the Women's National League since the introduction in 2017. The season began on 19 August 2023.

== Summary ==
Eight teams will participate in the 2023 season. The league champions will receive S$8,000, while the second and third-placed teams will receive S$5,000 and S$3,500 respectively.

Police SA was the defending Champions and will be playing in the 2023 Women's Premier League, even though Football Association of Singapore mentioned that there will not be any promotions for the next three editions including the 2022 Champions.

Royal Arion WFC became the fifth winner in as many editions of the WNL, beating Mattar Sailors 2–1 in the 2023 Final. W. Orapin's stunning 35-goal tally secured her the title of the top scorer.

Admiralty FC claimed third place following a resounding 5–0 victory over Ayer Rajah Gryphons FC in the third-placing match.

There shall be no promotion and relegation of WPL or WNL clubs for Seasons 2023 and 2024.

== Competition Format ==
The Women's National League will be played in a round-robin league format. The team which accumulates the greatest number of points at the end of the season shall be declared Champion as per the regulations released in November 2023.

However, the season proceeds with a knockout stage after the round-robin league, with the top four qualifying for the semi-finals play-off. This is a similar format to the 2022 season.

== Teams ==
A total of 8 teams competed in the league. There are several changes to the teams participated in 2022 season. Admiralty FC and Commonwealth Cosmos FC will be making their debut in league for the 2023 season.

Commonwealth Cosmos FC are a newly formed team comprising players mostly from the recreational women's football team, Team Ohana.

Eastern Thunder FC will be participating in the league under Admiralty FC.

Team	Team List
Admiralty FC	2023
Ayer Rajah Gryphons FC	
Bussorah Youths Sports Club	
Commonwealth Cosmos FC	
Mattar Sailors	2023
Royal Arion WFC	2023
Singapore Khalsa Association FC	
Winchester Isla FC	

== Group Stage ==
=== League table ===
Pos	Team	Pld	W	D	L	GF	GA	GD	Pts
1	Royal Arion (Q)	7	7	0	0	49	0	+49	21
2	Admiralty FC (Q)	7	5	1	1	36	7	+29	16
3	Mattar Sailors (Q)	7	5	0	2	21	4	+17	15
4	Ayer Rajah Gryphons (Q)	7	4	0	3	7	17	−10	12
5	Singapore Khalsa Association	7	2	2	3	9	15	−6	8
6	Commonwealth Cosmos	7	2	1	4	8	23	−15	7
7	Bussorah Youths Sports Club	7	1	0	6	8	25	−17	3
8	Winchester Isla	7	0	0	7	2	49	−47	0

Updated to match(es) played on 1 October 2023. Source: FAS
Rules for classification: 1) points; 2) goal difference; 3) number of goals scored; 4) number of wins
(Q) Qualified for Semi-Final

=== Fixtures and results ===
19 Aug 2023 1	Admiralty FC	22-0	Winchester Isla	West Coast
17:00 UTC+8	Amanina 4', 26', 29', 33', 46', 55', 73', 80'; Nathali N. 5', 31'; Brittanie B. 7', 11', 20', 49', 63', 68'; Viola L. 15', 25', 78', 83'; Sancia S. 76'; Charlene T. 89'			Stadium: Kent Ridge Secondary School

20 Aug 2023 2	Bussorah Youths	0-13	Royal Arion	Toa Payoh
17:00 UTC+8	Wan Nabilah (red card)	Report	W. Orapin 19' (pen.), 28', 38', 42' (pen.), 58', 77', 78', 79'; Joyce Foo 22'; K. Pikul 37', 90+1'; BYSC 66' (o.g.); S. Sunisa 83' (pen.)	Stadium: Toa Payoh Stadium; Player of the Match: Orapin Waenngoen

20 Aug 2023 3	Ayer Rajah	1-0	Singapore Khalsa	West Coast
	Nur Izyan Ahmad (red card)			Stadium: Kent Ridge Secondary School

20 Aug 2023 4	Commonwealth	0-3	Mattar Sailors	Yishun
19:30 UTC+8			Raeke E.; Yuvika S.	Stadium: Yishun Stadium

26 Aug 2023 5	Admiralty FC	6-0	Ayer Rajah	Jalan Besar
19:30 UTC+8	Brittanie B. 19', 32'; Amanina 22', 40'; Syarifah'Ain 45'; Viola L. 67'			Stadium: Jalan Besar Stadium

27 Aug 2023 6	Royal Arion	14-0	Commonwealth	Toa Payoh
17:00 UTC+8	W. Orapin 9', 10', 22', 33', 45+2', 62', 65', 69', 90'; Tharsh 46'; K. Pikul 5', 25', 43', 77'	Report		Stadium: Toa Payoh Stadium; Player of the Match: Orapin Waenngoen

27 Aug 2023 7	Singapore Khalsa	2-1	Bussorah Youths	Jurong East
17:00 UTC+8			Syarah Qistina	Stadium: Jurong East Stadium

27 Aug 2023 8	Winchester Isla	0-8	Mattar Sailors	Yishun
19:30 UTC+8			Raeka E.; Isis A.; Dorcas C.; Jaen L.; Yuvika S.	Stadium: Yishun Stadium

2 Sep 2023 9	Commonwealth	1-1	Singapore Khalsa	Choa Chu Kang
17:00 UTC+8				Stadium: Choa Chu Kang Stadium

2 Sep 2023 10	Bussorah Youths	0-3	Admiralty FC	Choa Chu Kang
19:30 UTC+8			Viola L. 26'; Brittanie B. 57'; Amanina 77'	Stadium: Choa Chu Kang Stadium

3 Sep 2023 11	Ayer Rajah	4-2	Winchester Isla	Yishun
17:00 UTC+8				Stadium: Yishun Stadium

3 Sep 2023 12	Mattar Sailors	0-1	Royal Arion	Yishun
19:30 UTC+8			K. Pikul 15'	Stadium: Yishun Stadium

9 Sep 2023 13	Singapore Khalsa	0-4	Mattar Sailors	Choa Chu Kang
17:00 UTC+8			Raeka E.; Rebecca H.; Adriana L.	Stadium: Choa Chu Kang Stadium

9 Sep 2023 14	Admiralty FC	2-0	Commonwealth	Choa Chu Kang
19:30 UTC+8	Viola L. 13'; Nurul Syuhadah 79'			Stadium: Choa Chu Kang Stadium

10 Sep 2023 15	Winchester Isla	0-3	Royal Arion	Choa Chu Kang
17:00 UTC+8		Report	Serena B. 17', 25'; W. Orapin 79'	Stadium: Choa Chu Kang Stadium; Player of the Match: Orapin Waenngoen

10 Sep 2023 16	Ayer Rajah	1-0	Bussorah Youths	Choa Chu Kang
19:30 UTC+8				Stadium: Choa Chu Kang Stadium

16 Sep 2023 17	Bussorah Youths	4-0	Winchester Isla	Choa Chu Kang
17:00 UTC+8				Stadium: Choa Chu Kang Stadium

16 Sep 2023 18	Commonwealth	0-1	Ayer Rajah	Choa Chu Kang
19:30 UTC+8				Stadium: Choa Chu Kang Stadium

17 Sep 2023 19	Mattar Sailors	0-2	Admiralty FC	Choa Chu Kang
17:00 UTC+8	Nur Izairida (red card) 33'	Report	Amanina 36', 81'; Iswaryadevi (yellow card) 76'	Stadium: Choa Chu Kang Stadium; Player of the Match: Sharifah Nur Amanina

17 Sep 2023 20	Royal Arion	7-0	Singapore Khalsa	Choa Chu Kang
19:30 UTC+8	W. Orapin 12', 37', 66', 68'; K. Pikul 61', 90'; S. Sunisa 56'	Report		Stadium: Choa Chu Kang Stadium

23 Sep 2023 21	Winchester Isla	0-5	Singapore Khalsa	Choa Chu Kang
17:00 UTC+8				Stadium: Choa Chu Kang Stadium

23 Sep 2023 22	Admiralty FC	0-6	Royal Arion	Choa Chu Kang
19:30 UTC+8		Report	W. Orapin 29', 36', 64', 84'; K. Pikul 77'; S. Sunisa 59'	Stadium: Choa Chu Kang Stadium; Player of the Match: Waraporn Boonsing

24 Sep 2023 23	Ayer Rajah	0-4	Mattar Sailors	Choa Chu Kang
17:00 UTC+8			Dorcas C.; Raeka E.; Sara M.	Stadium: Choa Chu Kang Stadium

24 Sep 2023 24	Bussorah Youths	2-4	Commonwealth	Choa Chu Kang
19:30 UTC+8				Stadium: Choa Chu Kang Stadium

30 Sep 2023 25	Royal Arion	5-0	Ayer Rajah	Choa Chu Kang
17:00 UTC+8	K. Pikul 38'; B. Waraporn 56', 81'; W. Orapin 58'; S. Sunisa 90'			Stadium: Choa Chu Kang Stadium; Player of the Match: Waraporn Boonsing

30 Sep 2023 26	Commonwealth	3-0	Winchester Isla	Choa Chu Kang
19:30 UTC+8				Stadium: Choa Chu Kang Stadium

1 Oct 2023 27	Singapore Khalsa	1-1	Admiralty FC	Choa Chu Kang
19:30 UTC+8			Brittanie B. 12'	Stadium: Choa Chu Kang Stadium

1 Oct 2023 28	Mattar Sailors	2-1	Bussorah Youths	Choa Chu Kang
17:00 UTC+8	Dorcus C.; Adriana			Stadium: Choa Chu Kang Stadium

== Knock-out Stage ==
=== Semi Final ===
7 Oct 2023 29	Royal Arion	10-0	Ayer Rajah	Choa Chu Kang
17:00 UTC+8	W. Orapin 2', 12', 27', 30', 71', 90+1'; Yu Ting 37'; S. Sunisa 56'; Janelle 82', 85'	Report		Stadium: Choa Chu Kang Stadium; Player of the Match: Orapin Waenngoen

7 Oct 2023 30	Admiralty FC	0-3	Mattar Sailors	Choa Chu Kang
19:30 UTC+8			Raeka Ee; Yuvika S.; Adriana	Stadium: Choa Chu Kang Stadium

=== Third Placing ===
15 Oct 2023 31	Ayer Rajah	0-5	Admiralty FC	Woodlands
17:00 UTC+8	Nur Sarafina (yellow card) 85'	Report	Nathali N. 8'; Brittanie B. 26', 38'; Amanina 66' (pen.), 85' (pen.)	Stadium: Woodlands Stadium; Attendance: 500; Referee: N Shanmugah; Player of the Match: Brittanie Bartlett

=== Final ===
15 Oct 2023 32	Royal Arion (C)	2-1	Mattar Sailors	Woodlands
	Serena B. 67'; W. Orapin 70'	Report	Raeka E. 7'	Stadium: Woodlands Stadium; Attendance: 500

Note: (C) Champions

== Statistics ==
=== Top scorers ===
As of 15 Oct 2023

Rank	Player	Club	Goals
1	(Thailand) Orapin Waenngoen	Royal Arion WFC	35
2	(Singapore) Sharifah Nur Amanina	Admiralty FC	15
3	(Singapore) Brittanie Bartlett	Admiralty FC	12

Source: Women's National League

== See also ==
- Football in Singapore
- Football Association of Singapore
- 2023 Women's Premier League (Singapore)
