= 2025 Women's National League (Singapore) =

Women's National League
- Season: 2025
- Dates: 14 June - 21 September 2025
- Champions: Mattar Sailors
- Matches: 42
- Goals: 202 (4.81 per match)
- Top goalscorer: (Singapore) Serena Bok (15 goals)
- Biggest home win: Mattar 11-0 GDT Circuit (3 Aug 2025)
- Biggest away win: GDT Circuit 0-8 Mattar (15 Jun 2025); Kaki Bukit 0-8 Eastern Thunder (27 Aug 2025)
- Highest scoring: Mattar 11-0 GDT Circuit (3 Aug 2025)

The 2025 Women's National League of the Football Association of Singapore (FAS) is the 7th season of the Women's National League since the introduction in 2017. The season will begin on 14 June 2025.

== Summary ==
On 17 April 2025, Football Association of Singapore (FAS) extended an invitation to non-member clubs and teams to participate in the Women’s National League (WNL) 2025.

Seven teams will participate in the 2025 season. Like 2023, there shall be no promotion and relegation of Women's Premier League or Women's National League (WNL) clubs for the 2025 season.

Mattar Sailors defended their title and took home S$8,000 in prize money after beating Royal Arion 2-0 in their final game of the season. Jungfrau Punggol and Eastern Thunder finished in second and third place respectively after drawing 1-1 in their final game on 21 September 2025.

Jungfrau Punggol’s Serena Bok claimed the top scorer award with 15 goals, just ahead of Nur Batrisyia of Kaki Bukit on 13. Mattar Sailors were the league’s most prolific side, scoring 51 goals, while also boasting the tightest defence with only eight goals conceded. Eastern Thunder, meanwhile, finished with the most clean sheets, registering six shutouts.

== Competition Format ==
Unlike 2024 season, the 2025 Women's National League will be played on a ‘home’ and ‘away’ round robin League format. The team which accumulates the greatest number of points at the end of the Competition shall be declared Champion.

== Teams ==
A total of seven teams will be competing in the league. Ayer Rajah Gryphons, Singapore Khalsa Association FC and Winchester Isla FC will not be participating in the 2025 season.

GDT Circuit FC, Unity FC and newly formed Jungfrau Punggol FC will be replacing the three exiting teams. This marked the return of GDT Circuit to WNL football since 2019.

GDT Circuit won the BCF Charity Cup 2025 on 22 February 2025. BCF Charity Cup 2025 is a special event celebrating both Asian Football Confederation Women’s Football Day as well as International Women’s Day organised by Breast Cancer Foundation (BCF) and FAS.

Unity FC participated in SPORTCARES HEART Football League in 2024. The club won their first-ever trophy by emerging as Champions in the competition.

Team	Head coach	Team List
Eastern Thunder FC		
GDT Circuit FC		
Jungfrau Punggol FC	Kunkhen/Thubten Lim	2025
Kaki Bukit SC	Salleh	2025
Mattar Sailors	Izz Haziq	2025
Royal Arion WFC	Chen Huixing	2025
Unity FC	Jarar	

== League table ==
Pos	Team	Pld	W	D	L	GF	GA	GD	Pts
1	Mattar Sailors FC (C)	12	10	1	1	51	8	+43	31
2	Jungfrau Punggol FC	12	9	1	2	35	13	+22	28
3	Eastern Thunder FC	12	8	1	3	34	9	+25	25
4	Unity FC	12	7	1	4	42	16	+26	22
5	Kaki Bukit SC	12	2	1	9	21	49	−28	7
6	Royal Arion Women's FC	12	2	0	10	14	31	−17	6
7	GDT Circuit FC	12	1	1	10	5	76	−71	4

Source: FAS
Rules for classification: 1) points; 2) goal difference; 3) number of goals scored; 4) number of wins
(C) Champions

=== Fixtures and results ===
14 Jun 2025 1	Eastern Thunder	3-0*	Royal Arion	XCL World Academy
15:00 UTC+8
Note: Eastern Thunder FC have been awarded a 3-0 win due to an infringement of the regulations in relation to substitution of players by Royal Arion Women's FC.

14 Jun 2025 2	Jungrau Punggol	2-1	Unity FC	Fuhua Secondary
15:00 UTC+8	Geraldine; Janelle		Goal

15 Jun 2025 3	GDT Circuit	0-8	Mattar Sailors	LCS Training Centre
19:00 UTC+8		Report	Tharshini; Maite; Maxine; Nayli; Milan

21 Jun 2025 4	Eastern Thunder	1-0	Unity FC	XCL World Academy
15:00 UTC+8	Nani (pen.)	Report

21 Jun 2025 5	Jungfrau Punggol	1-2	Mattar Sailors	LCS Training Centre
19:00 UTC+8	Serena	Report	Maite Jones; Maxine Maribbay

22 Jun 2025 6	Kaki Bukit	3-2	Royal Arion	Manjusri Secondary
17:00 UTC+8	Nur Batrisyia		Luana Carneiro

28 Jun 2025 7	GDT Circuit	0-4	Royal Arion	Fuhua Secondary
15:00 UTC+8		Report	Elizabeth 15'; Libby 61'; Luana Carneiro 63', 74'	Player of the Match: Luana C.

29 Jun 2025 8	Jungfrau Punggol	4-1	Kaki Bukit	Manjusri Secondary
17:00 UTC+8	Fathin; Serena

29 Jun 2025 9	Mattar Sailors	1-1	Unity FC	LCS Training Centre
19:00 UTC+8	Rasyiqah	Report

5 Jul 2025 10	Unity FC	4-0	Royal Arion	XCL World Academy
15:00 UTC+8

6 Jul 2025 11	GDT Circuit	0-5	Eastern Thunder	Manjusri Secondary
17:00 UTC+8		Report	Brittanie 2', 12', 73'; Ivy 76'; Phoenix 86'

6 Jul 2025 12	Mattar Sailors	7-0	Kaki Bukit	LCS Training Centre
19:00 UTC+8	Milan; Maxine; Remi; Jaen; (o.g.)

12 Jul 2025 13	Unity FC	P-P	GDT Circuit	XCL World Academy
15:00 UTC+8
Note: The match has been postponed due to inclement weather.

13 Jul 2025 14	Kaki Bukit	P-P	Eastern Thunder	Fuhua Secondary
15:00 UTC+8
Note: The match has been postponed due to inclement weather.

13 Jul 2025 15	Royal Arion	1-4	Jungfrau Punggol	Manjusri Secondary
15:00 UTC+8	Luana Carneiro	Report	Serena; Erica; Sherlyn

19 Jul 2025 16	Jungfrau Punggol	6-0	GDT Circuit	Fuhua Secondary
15:00 UTC+8	Serena; Sarah; Janelle; Alicia

19 Jul 2025 17	Kaki Bukit	1-3	Unity FC	XCL World Academy
15:00 UTC+8

20 Jul 2025 18	Eastern Thunder	2-1	Mattar Sailors	Manjusri Secondary
17:00 UTC+8	Tina; Ivy	Report	Joyce

27 Jul 2025 19	Kaki Bukit	8-1	GDT Circuit	Woodlands Secondary
15:00 UTC+8

27 Jul 2025 20	Eastern Thunder	0-3	Jungfrau Punggol	Manjusri Secondary
17:00 UTC+8		Report	Serena; Sherlyn

27 Jul 2025 21	Royal Arion	1-3	Mattar Sailors	LCS Training Centre
19:00 UTC+8	Luana Carneiro		Remi Ogawa

2 Aug 2025 22	Royal Arion	P-P	Eastern Thunder	Fuhua Secondary
15:00 UTC+8
Note: The match has been rescheduled.

3 Aug 2025 23	Unity FC	2-3	Jungfrau Punggol	Woodlands Secondary
15:00 UTC+8			Janelle; Annalisa; Fatin

3 Aug 2025 24	Mattar Sailors	11-0	GDT Circuit	LCS Training Centre
19:00 UTC+8	Maxine; Nayli; Sri; Remi; Rashyiqah; Hannah

13 Aug 2025 22*	Royal Arion	0-2	Eastern Thunder	Our Tampines Hub
21:00 UTC+8			Brittanie; Ivy
Note: The match was rescheduled from 2 August 2025.

16 Aug 2025 25	Royal Arion	P-P	Kaki Bukit	Fuhua Secondary
15:00 UTC+8
Note: Match has been reschedule

16 Aug 2025 26	Unity FC	2-1	Eastern Thunder	XCL World Academy
15:00 UTC+8	Goal		Brittanie

17 Aug 2025 27	Mattar Sailors	P-P	Jungfrau Punggol	LCS Training Centre
19:00 UTC+8
Note: Match has been postponed due to inclement weather.

23 Aug 2025 28	Royal Arion	P-P	GDT Circuit	Fuhua Secondary
15:00 UTC+8
Note: The match has been rescheduled due to venue unavailability

23 Aug 2025 29	Unity FC	1-5	Mattar Sailors	XCL World Academy
15:00 UTC+8			Maxine; Remi; (o.g.)

24 Aug 2025 30	Kaki Bukit	1-3	Jungfrau Punggol	Manjusri Secondary
17:00 UTC+8	Batrisyia		Nadhirah; Serene; Fathin

27 Aug 2025 14*	Kaki Bukit	0-8	Eastern Thunder	Our Tampines Hub
21:00 UTC+8		Report	Naqiba 14'; Tina 59', 72', 84'; Nani; Lauretta	Player of the Match: Tina
Note: The match was rescheduled from 13 Jul 2025.

27 Aug 2025 28*	Royal Arion	0-1	GDT Circuit	Choa Chu Kang Stadium
19:45 UTC+8
Note: The match was rescheduled from 23 August 2025.

30 Aug 2025 31	Royal Arion	1-4	Unity FC	XCL World Academy
15:00 UTC+8

31 Aug 2025 32	Eastern Thunder	7-0	GDT Circuit	Manjusri Secondary
17:00 UTC+8	Syuhadah 7', 40'; Lauretta 12'; Tina 16', 51'; Naqiba 35'; Karlijn 37'	Report

31 Aug 2025 33	Kaki Bukit	1-7	Mattar Sailors	LCS Training Centre
19:00 UTC+8	Batrisyia		Maite; Remi

3 Sep 2025 13*	Unity FC	5-0	GDT Circuit	Clementi Stadium
19:45 UTC+8
Note: The match was rescheduled from 13 Jul 2025.

34	Jungfrau Punggol	P-P	Royal Arion
UTC+8
Note: The match has been rescheduled

6 Sep 2025 35	Unity FC	0-16	GDT Circuit	XCL World Academy
15:00 UTC+8
Note: The match was rescheduled from 13 Jul 2025.

7 Sep 2025 36	Eastern Thunder	4-1	Kaki Bukit	LCS Training Centre
17:00 UTC+8	Tina Afrida; Nani		Batrisyia
Note: The match was rescheduled from 13 Jul 2025.

10 Sep 2025 34*	Jungfrau Punggol	4-1	Royal Arion	Clementi Stadium
19:45 UTC+8	Liesah; Annabel; Serena		Goal
Note: The match has been rescheduled from 6 Sep 2025.

13 Sep 2025 37	Unity FC	3-1	Kaki Bukit	XCL World Academy
15:00 UTC+8

13 Sep 2025 38	Mattar Sailors	1-0	Eastern Thunder	LCS Training Centre
17:00 UTC+8	Milan

14 Sep 2025 39	GDT Circuit	0-3	Jungfrau Punggol	Manjusri Secondary
17:00 UTC+8			Serena; Annabel; Kiera

18 Sep 2025 25*	Royal Arion	4-1	Kaki Bukit	Yishun Stadium
19:45 UTC+8
Note: Match was rescheduled from 16 August 2025.

18 Sep 2025 27*	Mattar Sailors	3-1	Jungfrau Punggol	Woodlands Stadium
19:45 UTC+8	Remi; Joyce; Maxine		Serena
Note: The match was rescheduled from 17 August 2025.

21 Sep 2025 40	Mattar Sailors	2-0	Royal Arion	Clementi Stadium
17:00 UTC+8	Maxine 76'; Kate 90+2'	Report

21 Sep 2025 41	GDT Circuit	3-3	Kaki Bukit	Woodlands Stadium
17:00 UTC+8	Atiqah; Natasha; Ryna		Goal

21 Sep 2025 42	Jungfrau Punggol	1-1	Eastern Thunder	Jurong East Stadium
17:00 UTC+8	Serena	Report

== Statistics ==
=== Top scorers ===
As of 21 Sep 2025

Rank	Player	Club	Goals
1	(Singapore) Serena Bok	Jungfrau Punggol	15
2	(Singapore) Nur Batrisyia Baharudin	Kaki Bukit	13
3	(Singapore) Maxine Maribbay	Mattar Sailors	12
4	(Japan) Remi Ogawa	Mattar Sailors	11
4	(Singapore) Tina Afrida Nasmi	Eastern Thunder	11
5	Mareike Messler	Unity FC	10
6	(Singapore) Maite Jones	Mattar Sailors	8
7	(Brazil) Luana Carneiro	Royal Arion	5
7	(England) Brittanie Bartlett	Eastern Thunder	5
8	(Singapore) Nayli Elvira Sha'aril	Mattar Sailors	4
9	(Singapore) Janelle	Jungfrau Punggol	3
9	(Singapore) Fathin	Jungfrau Punggol	3
9	(Singapore) Ivy	Eastern Thunder	3
9	(Singapore) Syuhadah	Eastern Thunder	3

Source: Women's National League

== Awards ==
The FAS hosted the Amateur Leagues Awards Night Season 2025 on Friday, 17 January 2026, at the Raffles Town Club. The event honoured the outstanding individuals from the Singapore Football League (SFL 1 and 2), Women’s Premier League (WPL), and Women’s National League (WNL).

Award	Nominee	Club	Recipient
Player of the Year	(Singapore) Serena Bok	Jungfrau Punggol	Serena Bok
Player of the Year	(Singapore) Batrisyia Baharudin	Kaki Bukit	Serena Bok
Player of the Year	(Singapore) Maxine Maribbay	Mattar Sailors	Serena Bok
Young Player of the Year	(Japan) Remi Ogawa	Mattar Sailors	Remi Ogawa
Young Player of the Year	(Singapore) Atiqah Hazirah	GDT Circuit	Remi Ogawa
Young Player of the Year	(Singapore) Chloe Su	Unity FC	Remi Ogawa
Coach of the Year	(Singapore) Izz Haziq	Mattar Sailors	Izz Haziq
Coach of the Year	(Singapore) Thubten Lim	Jungfrau Punggol	Izz Haziq
Coach of the Year	(Singapore) Amos Boon	Eastern Thunder	Izz Haziq
Golden Boot	(Singapore) Serena Bok (Jungfrau Punggol)		
Golden Glove	(Singapore) Nur Izyan Ahmad (Eastern Thunder)		
Fair Play Award	Eastern Thunder, GDT Circuit		

== See also ==
- 2025 Women's Premier League (Singapore)
- Football in Singapore
- Football Association of Singapore
