= Women's National League (Singapore) =

Association football league in Singapore

- Organising body: Football Association of Singapore (FAS)
- Founded: March 2017; 9 years ago
- Country: Singapore
- Confederation: AFC
- Number of clubs: 10
- Level on pyramid: 2
- Promotion to: Women's Premier League
- Current champions: Lion City Sailors 'B' (1 title)
- Most championships: Mattar Sailors (2 titles)
- Website: fas.org.sg
- Current: 2026 Women's National League

The Women's National League, commonly abbreviated as the WNL, is the second-tier women's football league in Singapore since 2017. It is run by the Football Association of Singapore (FAS) and currently features ten teams.

== History ==
On 23 December 2016, FAS announced that the Women's Premier League (WPL) would be revamped to form a two-division structure from 2017. The 2017 Women's Premier League would consist of the teams that finished in the top six of the 2016 season, while the newly-formed Women's National League (WNL) would be made up of teams that finished in the 7th-11th positions, along with any new teams.

A new system of promotion and relegation was also introduced to allow for greater participation in women's football. The champions of the 2017 WNL would be promoted to the 2018 WPL, while the last placed team of 2017 WPL would be relegated to 2018 WNL. The second-last placed team of the WPL would play against the runners-up of the WNL in a play-off.

Five 2016 WPL teams were scheduled to participate in the 2017 season. However, Tampines Rovers and Winchester Isla were the only 2016 WPL teams listed among the final list of nine participating teams. Changi Village SRC became the champions of the inaugural National League.

In 2019, both the Women's Premier League and National League were suspended due to COVID-19 pandemic in Singapore. While both leagues resumed in 2022, FAS announced that there will be no promotion or relegation between the two tiers for the next three seasons.

For the 2022 season, eleven clubs were split into three groups, where the top three teams and the best second-placed team qualified for the semi-finals. Nine clubs, including Police SA – who were relegated from the 2019 WPL – and JSSL FC, made their competition debuts. Police lifted the trophy after beating JSSL 4–0 in the final.

In 2023, eight clubs participated in a single round-robin format, and the top four teams advanced to the semi-finals, ultimately vying for a spot in the final. Royal Arion, boosted by Thai national team players, beat Mattar Sailors 2–1 to clinch their first league title.

On 21 February 2025, the FAS hosted the inaugural Amateur Leagues Awards Night 2024 at the SportSG Auditorium (BlackBox). This will mark a historic first for the WNL, with dedicated awards for Player of the Year, Young Player of the Year, Coach of the Year, Golden Boot, Golden Glove and Fairplay Award.

In 2025, the league was played in a ‘home’ and ‘away’ round-robin league format. The team which accumulated the greatest number of points at the end of the 2025 season was declared Champion. Mattar Sailors secured their second consecutive title after defeating Royal Arion 2–0 in their final game of the season.

The 2026 season introduced a series of structural and regulatory adjustments designed to strengthen competition and provide clearer pathways for player development. Promotion and relegation between the Women's Premier League and National League would be reintroduced. Premier League clubs were allowed to field a developmental B team in the second division. However, the B teams would not be eligible for promotion.

== Teams ==
Prior to the commencement of the National League, FAS will extend an invitation to non-member clubs and teams to participate in the league. Interested parties are required to fully comply to the Criteria of Purpose set forth by the association. The number of participating clubs and teams will determine the competition format for the season.

In 2026, Women's Premier League clubs were allowed to field a developmental B team in the second division. However, the B teams would not be eligible for promotion.

There are currently 10 clubs and teams participating in the 2026 season.

=== Former teams ===
Club	Years active
Ayer Rajah Gryphons	2022 - 2024
Bussorah Youths SC	2022 - 2023
Changi Village SRC	2017
Commonwealth Cosmos	2023
JSSL FC (Note: JSSL is currently partnering Tampines Rovers to compete in WPL)	2020
Middle Rangers FC	2018 - 2019
Phoenix Pride FC	2019
Republic FC	2018 - 2019
Simei United	2018
Singapore Cricket Club	2022
Singapore Football Club	2022
Singapore Khalsa Association	2022 - 2024
Tampines Changkat CSC	2018
Warriors FC	2018 - 2019
Westwood El'Junior FC	2022
Winchester Isla FC	2017 - 2024

Note: This list excludes teams that has been promoted to WPL.

== Past winners ==
Season	Winners	Runners-up	Ref
2017	Changi Village SRC	Home United (Note: Home United is currently known as Lion City Sailors)	
2018	Tampines Changkat CSC	Simei United	
2019	Tanjong Pagar United	Tiong Bahru	
2020	Competition not held due to Covid-19 Pandemic		
2021	Competition not held due to Covid-19 Pandemic		
2022	Police SA	JSSL FC	
2023	Royal Arion	Mattar Sailors	
2024	Mattar Sailors	Eastern Thunder	
2025	Mattar Sailors (2)	Jungfrau Punggol	
2026	Lion City Sailors 'B'	Frenz GDT Circuit	

== Performance by clubs ==
Club	Winners	Runners-up	Winning years
Mattar Sailors	2	1	2024, 2025
Lion City Sailors 'B'	1	0	2026
Royal Arion	1	0	2023
Police SA	1	0	2022
Tanjong Pagar United	1	0	2019
Tampines Changkat CSC	1	0	2018
Changi Village SRC	1	0	2017
Eastern Thunder	0	1	
Frenz GDT Circuit	0	1	
Home United	0	1	
JSSL FC	0	1	
Jungfrau Punggol	0	1	
Simei United	0	1	
Tiong Bahru	0	1	

== See also ==
- Women's Premier League (Singapore)
- Singapore football league system
