= 2024 Women's National League (Singapore) =

Women's National League
- Season: 2024
- Dates: 21 September - 8 December 2024
- Champions: Mattar Sailors
- Matches: 27
- Goals: 111 (4.11 per match)
- Top goalscorer: (Singapore) Nor Adriana Lim (15 goals)
- Biggest home win: Mattar 10-0 Ayer Rajah (13 Oct 2024)
- Biggest away win: Kaki Bukit 0-10 Eastern Thunder (2 Nov 2024)
- Highest scoring: Mattar 10-1 Kaki Bukit (21 Sep 2024)

The 2024 Women's National League of the Football Association of Singapore is the 6th season of the Women's National League since the introduction in 2017. The season began on 21 September 2024.

== Summary ==
Seven teams will participate in the 2024 season. Like 2023, there shall be no promotion and relegation of Women's Premier League or WNL clubs for the 2024 season.

All matches are scheduled to be played in Choa Chu Kang Stadium.

Mattar Sailors won the championship trophy and S$8,000 in prize money after beating Eastern Thunder 2-1 in the Final. Eastern Thunder took home S$5,000 as first runners-up.

The Football Association of Singapore will be hosting the inaugural Amateur Leagues Awards Night Season 2024 on Friday, 21 February 2025 at the SportSG Auditorium (BlackBox). This will mark a historic first for the WNL, with dedicated awards for Player of the Year, Young Player of the Year, Coach of the Year, Golden Boot, Golden Glove and Fairplay Award.

== Teams ==
A total of seven teams will be competing in the league. Bussorah Youths Sports Club will not be participating in the 2024 season.

2023 newcomer Commonwealth Cosmos FC, which was formed comprising players mostly from Team Ohana, will also not be participating. However, Team Ohana will be represented under Kaki Bukit SC, in a collaborative effort between both sides.

Eastern Thunder FC, participated in the 2023 season under Admiralty FC, will be playing under Eastern Thunder for the 2024 season. They will be led by former S-League goalkeeper Amos Boon.

| Team | Team List |
|---|---|
| Ayer Rajah Gryphons FC | |
| Eastern Thunder FC | 2024 |
| Kaki Bukit SC | 2024 |
| Mattar Sailors | 2024 |
| Royal Arion WFC | 2024 |
| Singapore Khalsa Association FC | |
| Winchester Isla FC | |

== Foreign players ==
| Club | Player 1 | Player 2 | Player 3 | Player 4 | Former players |
|---|---|---|---|---|---|
| Ayer Rajah Gryphons | (Italy) Andrea Pangilinan | (Italy) Lucille Galia | | | |
| Eastern Thunder FC | (Finland) Riina Timonen | (Finland) Tuuli Sarkka | (France) Jean Behrend | | |
| Kaki Bukit FC | Mallory Colys | Margaret Alice Hall | Chantel Marson | | |
| Royal Arion WFC | (Japan) Remi Ogawa | | | | |
| Winchester Isla FC | (Australia) Olliana Davies | | | | |

== Group Stage ==
=== League table ===
==== Round Robin ====
| Pos | Team | Pld | W | D | L | GF | GA | GD | Pts |
|---|---|---|---|---|---|---|---|---|---|
| 1 | Royal Arion (Q) | 6 | 5 | 1 | 0 | 12 | 3 | +9 | 16 |
| 2 | Mattar Sailors (Q) | 6 | 4 | 1 | 1 | 34 | 6 | +28 | 13 |
| 3 | Winchester Isla (Q) | 6 | 3 | 2 | 1 | 14 | 14 | 0 | 11 |
| 4 | Eastern Thunder (Q) | 6 | 3 | 1 | 2 | 22 | 7 | +15 | 10 |
| 5 | Singapore Khalsa Association | 6 | 1 | 2 | 3 | 5 | 14 | −9 | 5 |
| 6 | Kaki Bukit SC | 6 | 1 | 1 | 4 | 6 | 26 | −20 | 4 |
| 7 | Ayer Rajah Gryphons | 6 | 0 | 0 | 6 | 2 | 25 | −23 | 0 |

Updated to match(es) played on 20 Oct 2024. Source: FAS
Rules for classification: 1) points; 2) goal difference; 3) number of goals scored; 4) number of wins
(Q) Qualified for Semi-finals

=== Fixtures and results ===
| 21 Sep 2024 1 | Eastern Thunder | 3-1 | Singapore Khalsa | Choa Chu Kang |
| 17:00 UTC+8 | Riina Timonen 22' (pen.), 39' (pen.); Alvina Chik 83' | | Lavanya Gurunathan 7' | Stadium: Choa Chu Kang |

| 21 Sep 2024 2 | Mattar Sailors | 10-1 | Kaki Bukit | Choa Chu Kang |
| 19:30 UTC+8 | Marvin; Liyana; Adriana; Natasha; Jaen; Rayna; Maxine | | | Stadium: Choa Chu Kang |

| 22 Sep 2024 3 | Ayer Rajah | 1-3 | Winchester Isla | Choa Chu Kang |
| 17:00 UTC+8 | Jasvinder 45' | | Maureen 13'; Seri 53'; Naureen 92' | Stadium: Choa Chu Kang; Player of the Match: Naureen (WIFC) |

| 28 Sep 2024 4 | Kaki Bukit | 3-1 | Ayer Rajah | Choa Chu Kang |
| 17:00 UTC+8 | | | | Stadium: Choa Chu Kang |

| 28 Sep 2024 5 | Singapore Khalsa | 0-4 | Mattar Sailors | Choa Chu Kang |
| 19:30 UTC+8 | | | Adriana; Alyiah; Liyana | Stadium: Choa Chu Kang |

| 29 Sep 2024 6 | Royal Arion | 1-0 | Eastern Thunder | Choa Chu Kang |
| 19:30 UTC+8 | Nurhannah 90+2' | | | Stadium: Choa Chu Kang; Player of the Match: Nurhannah |

| 5 Oct 2024 7 | Mattar Sailors | 1-2 | Royal Arion | Choa Chu Kang |
| 17:00 UTC+8 | Rayna | | Wei Xuan 50'; Serena 52' | Stadium: Choa Chu Kang; Player of the Match: Wei Xuan |

| 5 Oct 2024 8 | Ayer Rajah | 0-1 | Singapore Khalsa | Choa Chu Kang |
| 19:30 UTC+8 | | | | Stadium: Choa Chu Kang |

| 6 Oct 2024 9 | Winchester Isla | 2-0 | Kaki Bukit | Choa Chu Kang |
| 19:30 UTC+8 | Imarsha 27'; Naureen 75' | | | Stadium: Choa Chu Kang; Player of the Match: Naureen |

| 12 Oct 2024 10 | Royal Arion | 2-1 | Kaki Bukit | Choa Chu Kang |
| 17:00 UTC+8 | | | | Stadium: Choa Chu Kang |

| 12 Oct 2024 11 | Eastern Thunder | 2-4 | Winchester Isla | Choa Chu Kang |
| 19:30 UTC+8 | Alvina Chik 27'; Brittanie Bartlett 58' | | Olliana 14'; Naureen 23'; Seri 46', 90' | Stadium: Choa Chu Kang; Player of the Match: Seri |

| 13 Oct 2024 12 | Mattar Sailors | 10-0 | Ayer Rajah | Choa Chu Kang |
| 17:00 UTC+8 | Adriana; Alyiah; Liyana; Celine; Jaen; Verona; Marvin | | | Stadium: Choa Chu Kang |

| 19 Oct 2024 13 | Ayer Rajah | 0-6 | Eastern Thunder | Choa Chu Kang |
| 17:00 UTC+8 | | | Brittanie Bartlett; Tan Jie Ying; Tina Afrida; Jean Loh | Stadium: Choa Chu Kang |

| 19 Oct 2024 14 | Kaki Bukit | 1-1 | Singapore Khalsa | Choa Chu Kang |
| 19:30 UTC+8 | | | | Stadium: Choa Chu Kang |

| 20 Oct 2024 15 | Winchester Isla | 1-1 | Royal Arion | Choa Chu Kang |
| 19:30 UTC+8 | Imarsha 28' | Report | Serena 73' | Stadium: Choa Chu Kang |

| 26 Oct 2024 16 | Singapore Khalsa | 2-2 | Winchester Isla | Choa Chu Kang |
| 17:00 UTC+8 | | | | Stadium: Choa Chu Kang |

| 26 Oct 2024 17 | Royal Arion | 2-0 | Ayer Rajah | Choa Chu Kang |
| 19:30 UTC+8 | Serena 52'; Lauretta 90+3' | | | Stadium: Choa Chu Kang; Player of the Match: Serena (RAW) |

| 27 Oct 2024 18 | Eastern Thunder | 1-1 | Mattar Sailors | Choa Chu Kang |
| 17:00 UTC+8 | Riina Timonen (pen.) | | | Stadium: Choa Chu Kang |

| 2 Nov 2024 19 | Kaki Bukit | 0-10 | Eastern Thunder | Choa Chu Kang |
| 17:00 UTC+8 | | | Nani; Tina Afrida; Brittanie; Alvina | Stadium: Choa Chu Kang |

| 2 Nov 2024 20 | Winchester Isla | 2-8 | Mattar Sailors | Choa Chu Kang |
| 19:30 UTC+8 | | | | Stadium: Choa Chu Kang |

| 3 Nov 2024 21 | Singapore Khalsa | 0-4 | Royal Arion | Choa Chu Kang |
| 17:00 UTC+8 | | | Clara 4'; Serena 9', 16'; 44' (o.g.) | Stadium: Choa Chu Kang; Player of the Match: Serena (RAW) |

== Knock-out Stage ==
=== Semi-finals ===
==== Semi Final 1 ====
| 9 Nov 2024 22 | Eastern Thunder | 1-0 | Royal Arion | Choa Chu Kang |
| 17:00 UTC+8 | Jean Loh 8' | | | Stadium: Choa Chu Kang Stadium |

| 16 Nov 2024 24 | Royal Arion | 0-0 | Eastern Thunder | Choa Chu Kang |
| 17:00 UTC+8 | | | | Stadium: Choa Chu Kang Stadium |

Eastern Thunder won 1–0 on aggregate.

==== Semi Final 2 ====
| 9 Nov 2024 23 | Winchester Isla | 1-3 | Mattar Sailors | Choa Chu Kang |
| 19:30 UTC+8 | Qadriyah | | Adriana; Maxine | Stadium: Choa Chu Kang Stadium |

| 16 Nov 2024 25 | Mattar Sailors | 3-0 | Winchester Isla | Choa Chu Kang |
| 19:30 UTC+8 | Liyana; Adriana; Alyiah | | | Stadium: Choa Chu Kang Stadium |

Mattar Sailors won 6–1 on aggregate.

=== Third Placing ===
| 8 Dec 2024 26 | Royal Arion | 4-1 | Winchester Isla | Choa Chu Kang |
| 19:30 UTC+8 | Serena 11', 27'; Sherlyn 50'; 45' (o.g.) | Report | | Stadium: Choa Chu Kang Stadium; Player of the Match: Serena (RAW) |
Note: Rescheduled from 23 Nov due to lightning alert.

=== Final ===
| 23 Nov 24 27 | Mattar Sailors (C) | 2-1 | Eastern Thunder | Choa Chu Kang |
| 17:30 UTC+8 | Adriana Lim 44'; Natasha Kaur | Report | Tina Afrida | Stadium: Choa Chu Kang Stadium |

Note: (C) Champions

== Statistics ==
=== Top scorers ===
As of 8 Dec 2024

| Rank | Player | Club | Goals |
|---|---|---|---|
| 1 | Nor Adriana Lim | Mattar Sailors | 15 |
| 2 | Brittanie Barlett | Eastern Thunder FC | 7 |
| 2 | Naureen Qadriyah | Winchester Isla | 7 |
| 2 | Putri Alyiah Seow | Mattar Sailors | 7 |
| 3 | Liyana Indah Rickit | Mattar Sailors | 5 |
| 3 | Serena Bok | Royal Arion WFC | 5 |

Source: Women's National League

== Awards ==
=== Amateur Leagues Awards Night 2024 ===
The Football Association of Singapore will be hosting the inaugural Amateur Leagues Awards Night Season 2024 on Friday, 21 February 2025 at the SportSG Auditorium (BlackBox).

| Award | Nominee | Club | Recipient |
|---|---|---|---|
| Player of the Year | Brittanie Bartlett | Eastern Thunder | Nur Izyan Ahmad |
| Player of the Year | Nor Adriana Lim | Mattar Sailors | Nur Izyan Ahmad |
| Player of the Year | Nur Izyan Ahmad | Eastern Thunder | Nur Izyan Ahmad |
| Young Player of the Year | Celine Koh | Mattar Sailors | Nor Adriana Lim |
| Young Player of the Year | Nor Adriana Lim | Mattar Sailors | Nor Adriana Lim |
| Young Player of the Year | Olliana Davies | Winchester Isla | Nor Adriana Lim |
| Coach of the Year | Amos Boon | Eastern Thunder | Amos Boon |
| Coach of the Year | Fazal Kefli | Winchester Isla | Amos Boon |
| Coach of the Year | Ikhwan Risydah | Mattar Sailors | Amos Boon |
| Golden Boot | Nor Adriana Lim (Mattar Sailors FC) | | |
| Golden Glove | Nur Izyan Ahmad (Eastern Thunder FC) | | |
| Fair Play Award | Mattar Sailors FC, Royal Arion WFC | | |

Source: fas.org.sg

== See also ==
- Football in Singapore
- Football Association of Singapore
- 2024 Women's Premier League (Singapore)
