= 2023 Women's Premier League (Singapore) =

22nd season of the Singapore Women's Premier League

Women's Premier League (Singapore)
- Season: 2023
- Dates: 18 March 2023 – 26 November 2023
- Champions: Lion City Sailors
- AFC Champions League: Lion City Sailors
- Matches: 90
- Goals: 376 (4.18 per match)
- Top goalscorer: (Japan) Kana Kitahara (17 goals)
- Biggest home win: Albirex (S) 11–0 Geylang (26 August 2023)
- Biggest away win: Geylang 0–12 Balestier (15 October 2023)
- Highest scoring: Geylang 0–12 Balestier (15 October 2023)
- Longest winning run: 13 matches Lion City Sailors
- Longest unbeaten run: 18 matches Lion City Sailors
- Longest winless run: 9 matches Tiong Bahru
- Longest losing run: 9 matches Tiong Bahru
- Total attendance: 5,721
- Average attendance: 64

The 2023 Women's Premier League (also known as the Deloitte Women's Premier League due to sponsorship reasons with audit firm Deloitte) was the 4th season of the Women's Premier League and the 22nd season of the top-flight women's football league in Singapore.

== Summary ==
10 teams will be participating in the 2023 season. The vast majority of matches will be played at Choa Chu Kang Stadium with the rest being played at Yishun Stadium, and Our Tampines Hub. Admission to all matches is free to the public. The stadiums suffered from poor pitches, lack of dugouts and insufficient changing rooms.

On 5 November 2023, Lion City Sailors (LCS) sealed their second consecutive title in the 2023 WPL season with an 11–0 victory against Geylang International. It was LCS' second title since its founding two years ago.

During FAS Awards Night 2023, Sailors' Yeong Sheau Shyan won the Coach of the Year for the second time in a row. Albirex Niigata (S) defender Kitahara Kana received the Deloitte Player of the Year award, while Dhaniyah Qasimah (Tanjong Pagar United) won Young Player of the Year.

== Teams ==
JSSL Tampines Rovers women's team was established in June 2022 under the partnership of Tampines Rovers and private football academy JSSL Singapore, as both sides extended their partnership to 2025. The team decided to compete in the second-tier 2022 Women's National League (WNL), where they finished as runners-up, before submitting their bid to join 2023 Women's Premier League.

2022 WNL champions Police Sports Association and debutant Geylang International FC also joined the 2023 season, expanding the league to 10 teams.

Team	Team List
Albirex Niigata (S)	2023
Balestier Khalsa	
Hougang United	2023
Geylang International	2023
Lion City Sailors	2023
Police SA	
Still Aerion	2023
JSSL Tampines Rovers	2023
Tanjong Pagar United	
Tiong Bahru FC	

== Foreign players ==
All teams are allowed to register a maximum of four (4) foreign players. Foreign players shall be sixteen (16) years of age and above (born on or before 31 December 2007) to be eligible for registration.

Players name in bold indicates the player was registered during the mid-season transfer window.

Club	Player 1	Player 2	Player 3	Player 4	Former Players
Albirex Niigata (S)	(Japan) Kana Kitahara	(Japan) **Marina Asada**	(United States) **Sierra Castles**	(Philippines) Marilou Bautista Rubio	(Wales) Lauren Reese
Balestier Khalsa	(Canada) Sydney Hector	(Japan) Akari Kato	(France) Victoire Quiterie Marie		
Geylang International	(Colombia) Nathalia Murillo Rengifo	(Ukraine) Olesia Sheremeta			
Hougang United	(Philippines) Riddle Reneelyn Sison				
Lion City Sailors	(United States) **Sara Hayduchok**	(Germany) Julia-Vanessa Farr	(Japan) Miray Hokotate Altun	(Philippines) **Nica Siy**	(Germany) Paula Druschke (Canada) Madison Josephine Telmer
Police SA					
Still Aerion WFC	(England) Carmen Calisto	(United States) Larissa Anne Orthmann	(Germany) Annabel Mathilde Marx		
Tampines Rovers	(France) Priscille Le Helloco	(England) **Maia McCoy**			(United States) Sara Hayduchok (Spain) Sofia Rodriguez (Brazil) Giselle Blumke
Tiong Bahru FC					
Tanjong Pagar United	(Japan) Yuki Monden	(Japan) Manami Fukuzawa			

== League table ==
Pos	Team	Pld	W	D	L	GF	GA	GD	Pts	Qualification or relegation
1	Lion City Sailors (C)	18	17	1	0	73	2	+71	52	Qualification for 2024–25 AFC Women's Champions League
2	Albirex Niigata (S)	18	13	4	1	71	17	+54	43	
3	Hougang United	18	10	2	6	33	10	+23	32	
4	Tanjong Pagar United	18	9	4	5	51	14	+37	31	
5	Police SA	18	8	4	6	28	25	+3	28	
6	Balestier Khalsa	18	8	1	9	43	50	−7	25	
7	Still Aerion	18	6	2	10	22	30	−8	20	
8	Tampines Rovers	18	5	2	11	36	39	−3	17	
9	Geylang International	18	2	0	16	8	92	−84	6	
10	Tiong Bahru	18	2	0	16	11	97	−86	6	

Source: Women's Premier League
Rules for classification: 1) points; 2) goal difference; 3) number of goals scored; 4) number of wins
(C) Champions

== Results ==
The league operates on a home and away round-robin format from 18 March to 26 November 2023.

Home \ Away	ALB	BAL	GEY	HOU	LCS	POL	STI	TAM	TBR	TPU
Albirex Niigata (S)		4–0	11–0	2–1	0–3	1–1	3–1	4–1	5–1	2–1
Balestier Khalsa	1–9		3–0	2–1	0–8	1–0	1–2	3–1	6–1	0–4
Geylang International	0–6	0–12		0–5	0–11	1–4	0–3	0–8	1–2	0–3
Hougang United	0–3	1–0	5–0		0–1	0–1	3–0	2–0	5–0	1–0
Lion City Sailors	1–1	6–0	6–0	1–0		3–0	1–0	1–0	10–0	1–0
Police SA	1–4	3–1	3–1	0–0	0–3		1–0	2–3	3–0	2–2
Still Aerion	1–2	2–4	2–3	0–3	0–3	1–1		1–2	3–1	0–0
Tampines Rovers	3–3	1–1	0–1	0–2	1–6	0–1	0–1		10–0	0–4
Tiong Bahru	0–10	1–8	2–1	0–4	0–6	0–5	0–2	1–6		1–8
Tanjong Pagar United	1–1	6–0	6–0	0–0	0–2	4–0	2–3	6–0	4–1	

Source: Football Association of Singapore
Legend: Blue = home team win; Yellow = draw; Red = away team win.
For upcoming matches, an "a" indicates there is an article about the rivalry between the two participants.

== Season statistics ==
=== Top scorers ===
Rank	Player	Club	Goals
1	Kitahara Kana	Albirex Niigata (S)	17
2	Marina Asada	Albirex Niigata (S)	15
3	Izzati Rosni	Lion City Sailors	12
3	Sydney Hector	Balester Khalsa	12
4	Azreena Maat	Balester Khalsa	11

== Awards ==
=== FAS Awards Night 2023 ===
Award	Winner	Club
Deloitte Player of the Year	Kitahara Kana	Albirex Niigata (S) FC
Young Player of the Year	Dhaniyah Qasimah	Tanjong Pagar United FC
Coach of the Year	Muhammad Yusuf Chatyawan	Lion City Sailors FC
