= 2023 Lion City Sailors Women season =

Lion City Sailors
2023 season
- Owner: Garena
- Chairman: Forrest Li
- Head coach: Muhammad Yusuf Chatyawan
- Premier League: 1st
- National League: Runner-ups (Mattar Sailors)
Home colours	Away colours

The 2023 season marked the Lion City Sailors Women's second consecutive season in the top flight of Singapore football and in the Women's Premier League. They were led by Muhammad Yusuf Chatyawan, who has a wealth of experience in women's football. She has previously managed the Indonesia national team.

== Squad ==
=== Women squad (LCS) ===
Squad No.	Name	Nationality	Date of birth (age)	Previous club	Contract Since	Contract end
Goalkeeper
1	Noor Kusumawati	(Singapore)	29 September 1990 (age 35)	(Singapore) Warriors FC	2022	2023
22	Beatrice Tan Li Bin	(Singapore)	29 June 1992 (age 34)	(Singapore) Tanjong Pagar United	2022	2023
Defender
3	Fatin Aqillah	(Singapore)	11 June 1994 (age 32)	(Singapore) Tanjong Pagar United	2022	2023
4	Umairah Hamdan	(Singapore)	11 March 2002 (age 24)	(Singapore) South Avenue CSC	2022	2023
8	Syazwani Ruzi	(Singapore)	6 March 2001 (age 25)	(Singapore) Still Aerion FC	2022	2023
13	Ernie Sulastri	(Singapore)	24 November 1988 (age 37)	(Singapore) Home United	2022	2023
17	Khairunnisa Anwar	(Singapore)	21 February 2003 (age 23)	(Singapore) South Avenue CSC	2022	2023
18	Munirah Mohamad	(Singapore)	13 February 1997 (age 29)	(Singapore) Police SA	2022	2023
25	Sara Hayduchok	(Philippines) (United States)		(Singapore) JSSL Tampines	2023	2023
27	Tia Foong Po Shiun	(Singapore)	31 July 2007 (age 19)	(Singapore) Mattar Sailors (W)	2022	2023
	Seri Nurinsyirah	(Singapore)	27 January 2007 (age 19)	(Singapore) Mattar Sailors (W)	2023	2023
Midfielder
14	Madelin Sophie Lock	(Singapore)	24 May 2007 (age 19)	(Singapore) Mattar Sailors (W)	2022	2023
16	Ho Huixin	(Singapore)	23 April 1992 (age 34)	(Singapore) Home United	2022	2023
19	Julia-Vanessa Farr	(Germany)	12 August 1991 (age 35)	(Singapore) Warriors FC	2022	2023
20	Cara Ming-Yan Chang	(Singapore)	28 November 2008 (age 17)	(Singapore) Mattar Sailors (W)	2022	2023
21	Venetia Lim Ying Xuan	(Singapore)	14 October 2003 (age 22)	(Singapore) Still Aerion FC	2022	2023
Forwards
5	Miray Hokotate Altun	(Japan)	6 April 2005 (age 21)	ANZA Singapore	2022	2023
9	Lila Tan Hui Ying	(Singapore) (France)	4 June 2003 (age 23)	(China) Aksil Shanghai	2022	2023
10	Izzati Rosni	(Singapore)	24 May 1999 (age 27)	(Malaysia) SWAT FC	2022	2023
12	Josephine Ang Kaile	(Singapore)	26 September 2006 (age 20)	(Singapore) Mattar Sailors (W)	2022	2023
23	Nica Siy	(Philippines)		(Philippines) Kaya F.C.–Iloilo (W)	2023	2023
Mid-season transferred players
2	Madison Josephine Telmer	(Canada)	29 October 2004 (age 21)	ANZA Singapore	2022	2023
6	Seri Ayu Natasha Naszri	(Singapore)	19 December 2007 (age 18)	(Singapore) Mattar Sailors (W)	2022	2023
7	Paula Druschke	(Germany)			2022	2023
11	Ardhra Arul Ganeswaran	(Singapore)	25 July 2007 (age 19)	(Singapore) Mattar Sailors (W)	2022	2023
99	Chloe Koh Ke Ying	(Singapore)	18 February 2007 (age 19)	(Singapore) Mattar Sailors (W)	2022	2023

=== Women squad (Mattar Sailors) ===
Squad No.	Name	Nationality	Date of birth (age)	Previous club	Contract Since	Contract end
Goalkeeper
1	Izairida Shakira	(Singapore)	2 June 2007 (age 19)		2022	2023
18	Chantale Lamasan Rosa	(Singapore)		Singapore Sports School	2023	2023
Defender
3	Tasha Foong Po Yui	(Singapore)	27 May 2005 (age 21)	(Singapore) ITE College East	2022	2023
4	Tyan Foong	(Singapore)		(Singapore)	2023	2023
5	Rebecca Harding	(Malaysia)	23 April 1985 (age 41)	(Malaysia) Selangor FC (W)	2023	2023
12	Siti Nur Hidayah	(Singapore)		(Singapore)	2023	2023
14	Isis Ang	(Singapore)	10 January 2003 (age 23)	(Singapore)	2022	2022
16	Syaizta Ohorella	(Singapore)		(Singapore)	2023	2023
Midfielder
6	Nadia Nuraffendi	(Singapore)	14 April 2006 (age 20)	(Singapore) Tampines-Meridian JC	2023	2023
8	Jaen Lee	(Singapore)		(Singapore)	2023	2023
10	Liyana Indah Rickit	(Singapore)	14 October 2009 (age 16)	(Singapore) ActiveSG	2022	2023
15	Yuvika Suresh	(Singapore)	1 March 2009 (age 17)	(Singapore)	2022	2023
17	Natasha Kaur	(Singapore)		(Singapore)	2023	2023
19	Anusha Saluja	(Singapore)		(Singapore)	2023	2023
20	Dorcas Chu	(Singapore)	29 July 2002 (age 24)	(Singapore) Lion City Sailors Women	2022	2023
21	Ruby Tjipto	(Singapore)		Youth Academy	2023	2023
22	Sara Merican	(Singapore)	19 April 1996 (age 30)	(Singapore) Lion City Sailors Women	2022	2023
Forward
7	Nor Adriana Lim	(Singapore)		(Singapore)	2023	2023
9	Raeka Ee Pei Ying	(Singapore)		Singapore Sports School	2023	2023
11	Elena Khoo	(Singapore)		(Singapore) Brazilian Football Academy	2023	2023
13	Katelyn Yeoh	(Singapore)		(Singapore)	2023	2023
23	Nur Ain Salleh	(Singapore)		Youth Academy	2023	2023
24	Maxine Maribbay	(Singapore)	21 April 2005 (age 21)		2023	2023
25	Syafina Putri Rashid	(Singapore)	9 August 2004 (age 22)	(Singapore) Lion City Sailors Women	2022	2023

== Coaching staff ==
The following list displays the coaching staff of all the Lion City Sailors current football sections:

First Team

Position	Name
Head Coach (Women)	(Indonesia) Muhammad Yusuf Chatyawan
Assistant Head Coach (Women)	(Singapore) Yeong Sheau Shyan

== Transfers ==
=== In ===
Pre-season

Position	Player	Transferred from	Team	Ref
GK	(Singapore) Izairida Shakira	(Singapore) Mattar Sailors (W)	Mattar Sailors (W)	Promoted
DF	(Singapore) Tia Foong Po Shiun	(Singapore) Mattar Sailors (W)	Mattar Sailors (W)	Promoted
MF	(Singapore) Seri Ayu Natasha Naszri	(Singapore) Mattar Sailors (W)	Mattar Sailors (W)	Promoted
MF	(Singapore) Ardhra Arul Ganeswaran	(Singapore) Mattar Sailors (W)	Mattar Sailors (W)	Promoted
MF	(Singapore) Madelin Sophie Lock	(Singapore) Mattar Sailors (W)	Mattar Sailors (W)	Promoted
FW	(Singapore) Josephine Ang Kaile	(Singapore) Mattar Sailors (W)	Mattar Sailors (W)	Promoted
FW	(Singapore) Chloe Koh Ke Ying	(Singapore) Mattar Sailors (W)	Mattar Sailors (W)	Promoted

Mid-season

Position	Player	Transferred from	Team	Ref
MF	(Singapore) Cara Ming-Yan Chang	(Singapore) Mattar Sailors (W)	Mattar Sailors (W)	Promoted
DF	(Singapore) Seri Nurinsyirahh	(Singapore) Mattar Sailors (W)	Mattar Sailors (W)	Promoted
DF	(Philippines) (United States) Sara Hayduchok	(Singapore) JSSL Tampines	First Team	Free
FW	(Philippines) Nica Siy	(Philippines) Kaya F.C.–Iloilo (W)	First Team	Free

=== Out ===
Preseason

Position	Player	Transferred To	Team	Ref
DF	(Singapore) Yasmin Namira	(United States) Graceland University	Mattar Sailors (W)	Free
DF	(Singapore) Shaniz Qistina	(Singapore) Tiong Bahru (W)	Mattar Sailors (W)	Free
MF	(Singapore) Sara Merican	(Singapore) Mattar Sailors (W)	First Team	Free.
MF	(Singapore) Aaniya Ahuja	(United States) Pepperdine University	Mattar Sailors (W)	Free
MF	(Germany) Giselle Blumke	(Singapore) JSSL Tampines	Mattar Sailors (W)	Free.
FW	(Singapore) Nicole Lim Yan Xiu	(Singapore) Hougang United (W)	First Team	Free.
FW	(Singapore) Nur Syafina Putri Rashid	(Singapore)	First Team	Free.
FW	(Singapore) Nurul Ariqah	(Singapore) Balestier Khalsa (W)	Mattar Sailors (W)	Free
FW	(Singapore) Charlotte Chong	(Singapore) Geylang International (W)	Mattar Sailors (W)	Free

Mid-season

Position	Player	Transferred To	Team	Ref
MF	(Canada) Madison Telmer	(Canada) UFV Cascades	First Team	End of Contract
MF	(Singapore) Seri Ayu Natasha Naszri	(Spain) ESC La Liga Academy	First Team	Scholarship till 2025
MF	(Singapore) Ardhra Arul Ganeswaran	(United States) IMG Academy	First Team	Scholarship till 2026
MF	(Singapore) Dorcas Chu	(Singapore) Mattar Sailors (W)	First Team	Free.
FW	(Singapore) Chloe Koh Ke Ying	(United States) IMG Academy	First Team	Scholarship till 2026
FW	(Germany) Paula Druschke	NA	First Team	End of Contract

=== Loan Returns ===
Preseason

Position	Player	Transferred from	Team	Ref

Mid-season

Position	Player	Transferred from	Ref

=== Loans Out ===
Preseason

Position	Player	Transferred To	Team	Ref
MF	(Singapore) Nur Izzati Rosni	(Malaysia) FC SWAT	First Team	On loan till March 2023
MF	(Singapore) Ernie Sulastri	(Malaysia) FC SWAT	First Team	On loan till March 2023

Mid-Season

Position	Player	Transferred To	Ref

=== Contract extensions ===
Position	Player	Ref
GK	(Singapore) Noor Kusumawati	
GK	(Singapore) Beatrice Tan Li Bin	
DF	(Singapore) Fatin Aqillah	
DF	(Singapore) Munirah Mohamad	
DF	(Singapore) Khairunnisa Anwar	
DF	(Singapore) Nur Umairah Hamdan	
MF	(Singapore) Nur Izzati Rosni	
DF	(Singapore) Nur Syazwani Ruzi	
MF	(Singapore) Venetia Lim Ying Xuan	
MF	(Germany) Julia-Vanessa Farr	
MF	(Singapore) Dorcas Chu	
MF	(Canada) Madison Josephine Telmer	
FW	(Japan) Miray Hokotate Altun	
FW	(Singapore) (France) Lila Tan Hui Ying	
FW	(Germany) Paula Druschke	

== Friendlies ==
=== Pre-season friendlies ===
Win Draw Loss

== Team statistics ==
=== Appearances and goals (Women) ===
As of 19 Nov 2023

No.	Pos.	Player	WPL		Total	
No.	Pos.	Player	Apps.	Goals	Apps.	Goals
1	GK	(Singapore) Noor Kusumawati	3+1	0	4	0
3	DF	(Singapore) Fatin Aqillah	3+1	1	4	1
4	DF	(Singapore) Nur Umairah	11	0	11	0
5	FW	(Japan) Miray Altun	15+3	10	16	10
8	DF	(Singapore) Nur Syazwani Ruzi	15+1	4	14	3
9	FW	(Singapore) (France) Lila Tan Hui Ying	13+4	7	15	6
10	MF	(Singapore) Nur Izzati Rosni	13+1	12	14	12
12	FW	(Singapore) Josephine Ang Kaile	7+7	7	12	7
13	MF	(Singapore) Ernie Sulastri	15	1	13	1
14	MF	(Singapore) Madelin Sophie Lock	10+2	7	10	4
16	MF	(Singapore) Ho Hui Xin	11+4	1	13	1
17	DF	(Singapore) Khairunnisa Khairol Anwar	13+2	1	14	1
18	MF	(Singapore) Munirah Mohamad	11	0	9	0
19	MF	(Germany) Julia-Vanessa Farr	1+5	3	5	3
20	MF	(Singapore) Cara Ming-Yan Chang	6+2	5	6	5
21	MF	(Singapore) Venetia Lim Ying Xuan	4+1	2	5	2
22	GK	(Singapore) Beatrice Tan	15	0	13	0
23	FW	(Philippines) Nica Siy	2	2	1	1
25	DF	(Philippines) (United States) Sara Hayduchok	6+1	0	5	0
27	DF	(Singapore) Tia Foong Po Shiun	7+2	1	8	1
Players who have played this season but had left the club or on loan to other club
2	MF	(Canada) Madison Telmer	7	3	7	3
6	MF	(Singapore) Seri Ayu Natasha Naszri	4+2	0	6	0
7	FW	(Germany) Paula Druschke	2+1	1	3	1
11	MF	(Singapore) Ardhra Arul Ganeswaran	2+3	2	5	2
99	FW	(Singapore) Chloe Koh Ke Ying	1+2	3	3	3

=== Appearances and goals (Mattar Sailors) ===
As of 16 Sept 2023

No.	Pos.	Player	WNL		Total	
No.	Pos.	Player	Apps.	Goals	Apps.	Goals
1	GK	(Singapore) Izairida Shakira	6	0	6	0
3	DF	(Singapore) Tasha Foong Po Yui	8	0	8	0
4	DF	(Singapore) Tyan Foong	7+1	0	8	0
5	DF	(England) Rebecca Harding	6	1	6	1
6	MF	(Singapore) Nadia Nuraffendi	8	0	8	0
7	FW	(Singapore) Nor Adriana Lim	4	4	4	4
8	MF	(Singapore) Jaen Lee	2+2	1	4	1
9	FW	(Singapore) Raeka Ee	8	9	8	9
10	MF	(Singapore) Liyana Indah Rickit	9	0	9	0
11	FW	(Singapore) Elena Khoo	3	0	3	0
12	DF	(Singapore) Siti Nur Hidayah	0	0	0	0
13	FW	(Singapore) Katelyn Yeoh	1+2	0	3	0
14	MF	(Singapore) Isis Ang	7	2	7	2
15	MF	(Singapore) Yuvika Suresh	4+1	3	5	3
16	DF	(Singapore) Syaizta Ohorella	1+2	0	3	0
17	MF	(Singapore) Natasha Kaur	6+1	0	7	0
18	GK	(Singapore) Chantale Lamasan Rosa	3+1	0	4	0
19	MF	(Singapore) Anusha Saluja	1	0	1	0
20	MF	(Singapore) Dorcas Chu	6+1	4	7	4
21	MF	(Singapore) Ruby Tjipto	2	0	2	0
22	MF	(Singapore) Sara Merican	6	1	6	1
23	MF	(Singapore) Nur Ain Salleh	0	0	0	0
24	FW	(Singapore) Maxine Maribbay	1+1	0	2	0
25	FW	(Singapore) Syafina Putri Rashid	0	0	0	0
Players who have played this season but had left the club or on loan to other club

== Competition (Women's Premier League) ==
=== Women's Premier League ===
Win Draw Loss

19 March 2023 1	Lion City Sailors (Singapore)	3–0	(Singapore) Police SA	Choa Chu Kang
	Madison Telmer 4'; Nur Izzati Rosni 79' 85'			Stadium: Choa Chu Kang Stadium

25 March 2023 2	Still Aerion (Singapore)	0–3	(Singapore) Lion City Sailors	Choa Chu Kang
			Khairunnisa Khairol Anwar 18'; Nur Syazwani Ruzi 21'; Fatin Aqillah 51'	Stadium: Choa Chu Kang Stadium

21 May 2023 3	Lion City Sailors (Singapore)	1–0	(Singapore) JSSL Tampines	Choa Chu Kang
	Paula Druschke 87'			Stadium: Choa Chu Kang Stadium

27 May 2023 4	Tanjong Pagar United (Singapore)	0–2	(Singapore) Lion City Sailors	Choa Chu Kang
			Lila Tan 19'; Ardhra Arul Ganeswaran 90+9'	Stadium: Choa Chu Kang Stadium

17 June 2023 5	Lion City Sailors (Singapore)	1–1	(Japan) Albirex Niigata	Yishun
	Nur Izzati Rosni 18' (pen.)		Tina Afrida Nasmi 89'	Stadium: Yishun Stadium

25 June 2023 6	Balestier Khalsa (Singapore)	0–8	(Singapore) Lion City Sailors	Choa Chu Kang
			Nur Izzati Rosni; Madison Telmer; Miray Altun; Lila Tan; Julia-Vanessa Farr	Stadium: Choa Chu Kang Stadium

22 July 2023 7	Lion City Sailors (Singapore)	6–0	(Singapore) Geylang International	Choa Chu Kang
	Miray Altun 26'; Chloe Koh 46' 89' 90+1'; Venetia Lim 89' 90+4'			Stadium: Choa Chu Kang Stadium

30 July 2023 8	Hougang United (Singapore)	0–1	(Singapore) Lion City Sailors	Choa Chu Kang
			Miray Altun 85'	Stadium: Choa Chu Kang Stadium

5 August 2023 9	Lion City Sailors (Singapore)	10–0	(Singapore) Tiong Bahru FC	Choa Chu Kang
	Josephine Ang Kaile 23' 27'; Miray Altun 26'; Nur Izzati Rosni 37' 48' 60'; Lila Tan Hui Ying 75'; Nur Syazwani Ruzi 78'; Tia Foong Po Shiun 83'; Ardhra Arul Ganeswaran 86'			Stadium: Choa Chu Kang Stadium

13 August 2023 10	Police SA (Singapore)	0–3	(Singapore) Lion City Sailors	Choa Chu Kang
			Cara Chang; Nur Izzati Rosni 25'; Lila Tan Hui Ying 74'	Stadium: Choa Chu Kang Stadium

19 August 2023 11	Lion City Sailors (Singapore)	1–0	(Singapore) Still Aerion	Choa Chu Kang
	Josephine Ang Kaile 8'			Stadium: Choa Chu Kang Stadium

27 August 2023 12	JSSL Tampines (Singapore)	1–6	(Singapore) Lion City Sailors	Choa Chu Kang
	82'		Cara Chang 1', 41'; Josephine Ang Kaile 39'; Nur Izzati Rosni 51' (pen.); Lila Tan 61'; Ernie Sulastri 89'	Stadium: Choa Chu Kang Stadium

15 October 2023 13 (Rescheduled)	Lion City Sailors (Singapore)	1–0	(Singapore) Tanjong Pagar United	Yishun
	Nur Syazwani Ruzi 90+4' (pen.)			Stadium: Yishun Stadium; Referee: Shafiq Ali

29 October 2023 14 (Rescheduled)	Albirex Niigata (Japan)	0–3	(Singapore) Lion City Sailors	Clementi
			Cara Ming-Yan Chang 20'; Miray Altun 23'; Madelin Sophie Lock 39'	Stadium: Clementi Stadium

22 October 2023 15	Lion City Sailors (Singapore)	6–0	(Singapore) Balestier Khalsa	Choa Chu Kang
	Madelin Sophie Lock 29', 82'; Nur Izzati Rosni 37'; Cara Ming-Yan Chang 72'; Seri Nurhidayah 77' (o.g.); Miray Altun 86'			Stadium: Choa Chu Kang Stadium

5 November 2023 16	Geylang International (Singapore)	0–11	(Singapore) Lion City Sailors	Clementi
			Julia-Vanessa Farr 12', 42'; Miray Altun 19', 70'; Josephine Ang Kaile 32', 47', 57'; Lila Tan 36'; Madelin Sophie Lock 57'; Nica Siy 69'; Ho Hui Xin 87'	Stadium: Clementi Stadium

19 November 2023 17	Lion City Sailors (Singapore)	1–0	(Singapore) Hougang United	Choa Chu Kang
	Nur Syazwani Ruzi 82'			Stadium: Choa Chu Kang Stadium

25 November 2023 18	Tiong Bahru FC (Singapore)	0–6	(Singapore) Lion City Sailors	Choa Chu Kang
			19' (o.g.); Madelin Sophie Lock 34', 50', 63'; Nica Siy 45'; Lila Tan 54'	Stadium: Choa Chu Kang Stadium

League table

Pos	Team	Pld	W	D	L	GF	GA	GD	Pts	Qualification or relegation
1	Lion City Sailors (C)	18	17	1	0	73	2	+71	52	League champions
2	(Japan) Albirex Niigata (S)	17	12	4	1	69	16	+53	40	
3	Hougang United	17	10	2	5	33	9	+24	32	
4	Tanjong Pagar United	17	9	4	4	50	12	+38	31	
5	Police SA	17	7	4	6	27	25	+2	25	
6	Balestier Khalsa	17	7	1	9	40	49	−9	22	
7	Still Aerion	18	6	2	10	22	30	−8	20	
8	JSSL Tampines	17	5	2	10	35	36	−1	17	
9	Tiong Bahru	18	2	0	16	11	97	−86	6	
10	Geylang International	18	2	0	16	8	92	−84	6	

Updated to match(es) played on 1 October 2022. Source: FAS
(C) Champions

== Competition (Women's National League) ==
(Played under name of Mattar Sailors Women)

Win Draw Loss

=== Round Robin ===
20 August 2023 1	Mattar Sailors (Singapore)	3–0	(Singapore) Commonwealth Cosmos	Yishun
	Raeka Ee (?); Yuvika Suresh (?)			Stadium: Yishun Stadium

27 August 2023 2	Mattar Sailors (Singapore)	8–0	(Singapore) Winchester Isla	Yishun
	Raeka Ee (?); Isis Ang (?); Dorcas Chu (?); Jaen Lee (?); Yuvika Suresh (?)			Stadium: Yishun Stadium

3 September 2023 3	Mattar Sailors (Singapore)	0–1	(Singapore) Royal Arion	Choa Chu Kang
				Stadium: Choa Chu Kang Stadium

9 September 2023 4	Mattar Sailors (Singapore)	4–0	Singapore Khalsa	Choa Chu Kang
	Raeka Ee (?); Rebecca Harding (?); Adriana Lim (?)			Stadium: Choa Chu Kang Stadium

17 September 2023 5	Mattar Sailors (Singapore)	0–2	(Singapore) Admiralty FC	Choa Chu Kang
			Sharifah Amanina 36', 81'	Stadium: Choa Chu Kang Stadium

24 September 2023 6	Mattar Sailors (Singapore)	4–0	(Singapore) Ayer Rajah Gryphons	Choa Chu Kang
	Dorcas Chu (?); Raeka Ee (?); Sara Merican (?)			Stadium: Choa Chu Kang Stadium

1 October 2023 7	Mattar Sailors (Singapore)	2–1	(Singapore) Bussorah Youths	Choa Chu Kang
	Adriana Lim (?); Dorcas Chu (?)			Stadium: Choa Chu Kang Stadium

League table

Pos	Team	Pld	W	D	L	GF	GA	GD	Pts
1	Royal Arion (Q)	7	7	0	0	49	0	+49	21
2	Admiralty FC (Q)	7	5	1	1	36	7	+29	16
3	Mattar Sailors (Q)	7	5	0	2	21	4	+17	15
4	Ayer Rajah Gryphons (Q)	7	4	0	3	7	17	−10	12
5	Singapore Khalsa	7	2	2	3	9	15	−6	8
6	Commonwealth Cosmos	7	2	1	4	8	23	−15	7
7	Bussorah Youths	7	1	0	6	8	25	−17	3
8	Winchester Isla	7	0	0	7	2	49	−47	0

Updated to match(es) played on 1 October 2022. Source: FAS
(Q) Qualified for the phase indicated

Semi Final to be played on 7 Oct and Final to be played on 15 Oct.

=== Semi Final ===
7 October 2023 Semi Final	Mattar Sailors (Singapore)	3–0	(Singapore) Admiralty FC	Choa Chu Kang
	Raeka Ee (?); Yuvika Suresh (?); Adriana (?)			Stadium: Choa Chu Kang Stadium

=== Final ===
15 October 2023 Final	Mattar Sailors (Singapore)	1–2	(Singapore) Royal Arion	Woodlands
	Raeka Ee 7'		Orapin Waenngeon 67', 70'	Stadium: Woodlands Stadium
