= Amos Boon =

Singaporean footballer (born 1972)

Personal information
- Full name: Amos-Leonard Boon Hock Chye
- Date of birth: 12 July 1972 (age 54)
- Place of birth: Singapore
- Height: 1.72 m (5 ft 8 in)
- Position: Goalkeeper

Team information
- Current team: Woodlands Wellington
- Number: 1

Senior career*
Years	Team	Apps	(Gls)
1996–1998	Tanjong Pagar United	3	(?)
1999–2003	Marine Castle United	143	(0)
2005–2006	Home United	3	(0)
2006–2007	Sengkang Punggol	45	(0)
2008	Geylang United	23	(0)
2009–2010	Sengkang Punggol	18	(0)
2011	Woodlands Wellington	8	(0)

Managerial career
- 2016-2022: Singapore Cricket Club (Men's & Women's)
- 2023-present: Eastern Thunder FC
- * Club domestic league appearances and goals as of September 4, 2008

Amos Leonard Boon Hock Chye (born 12 July 1972) is a former goalkeeper who last played for Woodlands Wellington in the 2011 S-League season. He was retired professionally at the end of the season.

Boon is a former Singapore youth international and Combined Schools player. He has also represented Singapore in the Tiger 5 Futsal tournament playing against the likes of Brazil.

Boon is currently the head coach of Eastern Thunder FC Women's team.

== Football career ==
Boon started his S.League career with Tanjong Pagar United in 1996, which he stayed for three years. He then moved to Marine Castle United for five years.

He had a brief stint at Home United for two years where he played against the likes of Selangor (Malaysia), Valencia FC (Maldives) and Happy Valley (Hong Kong) in the AFC Cup, before returning to Sengkang Punggol. He played for 7.5 years with Sengkang Punggol before joining Geylang United for the 2008 season. Many fans were shocked at the move as it was speculated that he would stay at Sengkang and end his career at the Hougang Stadium.. He returned to Hougang United for another two years before ending his career at Woodlands Wellington in 2011.

In 2016, Amos joined the management team as a coach at Singapore Cricket Club (SCC).

In 2019, Amos was nominated for NFL Division Two Coach of the Year after bringing SCC to a 4th position in the league. SCC was knocked out on the third round of the FA Cup.

In 2022, he led the SCC Men's team back to 2023 Singapore Football League (SFL) 1 by finishing 2nd, and also winning honours for SCC Women's team in the SCC7's and SportCares Y10 League.

On 30 November 2022, Amos tendered his resignation for both the Women's and the Men's teams.

In 2023, the former S-League goalkeeper was approached to join Admiralty FC as part of its rebranding. Admiralty (Women's team), formed by Eastern Thunder, participated in Women's National League. They will be participating in the 2024 season under Eastern Thunder FC.

In 2024, Boon lead Eastern Thunder to the 4th placing during the league phase of the Women's National League, qualifying for the knockout phase. Eastern Thunder eventually claimed 2nd place after losing to Mattar Sailors 2-1 in the Final. Boon went on to win the Coach of the Year during the Amateur Leagues Awards Night 2024.

== Wakeboard career ==
During recovery from an injury in 1999, Boon started wakeboarding. In 2002, Boon became a member of the national wakeboarding team.

In 2003, Boon became the president of the Wakeboard Association (Singapore).

In 2004, Boon participated in the Asian X Games in wakeboarding and reached the semi-finals.

Boon also co-founded a wakeboarding school, Launch Wakeboard School.

== Professional career ==
In 2006, Boon started Launch Group, an events management agency, initially organising wakeboarding events. The company eventually change to manage artists, product launches, local and overseas conferences.

Boon filed for bankruptcy in October 2022.
