= 2007 FAS Women's Challenge Cup =

2007 Women's Challenge Cup
FAS Women's Challenge Cup

Tournament details
- Country: Singapore
- Dates: 3 February – 24 March 2007
- Teams: 14

Final positions
- Champions: United World College
- Runners-up: Bishan Arsenal 'A'

Tournament statistics
- Matches played: 29
- Goals scored: 147 (5.07 per match)
- (Note: All statistics do not include penalty shoot-outs)

The 2007 FAS Women's Challenge Cup, also known as Women's Challenge Cup, was the seventh season of the FAS Women's Challenge Cup in Singapore.

On 15 March 2007, United World College won the tournament by defeating Bishan Arsenal FC 'A' over a penalty shoot-out in the 2007 Women's Challenge Cup Final.

== Teams ==
The competition saw the participation of a total of 15 teams, divided into three groups. The winners of each group and the best runner-ups then qualified for the Semi Finals of the tournament.

== Group Stage ==
=== Group A ===
Pos	Team	Pld	W	D	L	GF	GA	GD	Pts
1	Bishan Arsenal FC 'A' (Q)	3	3	0	0	27	1	+26	9
2	FAS Young Women	3	2	0	1	26	4	+22	6
3	Nanyang Technological University	3	1	0	2	2	18	−16	3
4	NYPGA	3	0	0	3	0	32	−32	0

Source: fas.org.sg
Rules for classification: 1) points; 2) goal difference; 3) number of goals scored; 4) number of wins
(Q) Qualified for the phase indicated

3 February 2007	NTU	0-9	Young Women	NTU
17:00 UTC+8		Report

10 February 2007	NYPGA	0-14	Bishan Arsenal "A"	Nanyang Polytechnic
17:00 UTC+8		Report

24 February 2007	NYPGA	0-2	NTU	Nanyang Polytechnic
17:00 UTC+8		Report

3 March 2007	NTU	0-9	Bishan Arsenal "A"	NTU
17:00 UTC+8		Report

3 March 2007	Young Women	16-0	NYPGA	Clementi Stadium
17:00 UTC+8		Report

10 March 2007	Bishan Arsenal "A"	4-1	Young Women	Jurong Stadium
17:00 UTC+8		Report

=== Group B ===
Pos	Team	Pld	W	D	L	GF	GA	GD	Pts
1	Police FC (Q)	4	3	1	0	21	1	+20	10
2	United World College (Q)	4	3	1	0	10	0	+10	10
3	Paya Lebar Punggol FC	4	1	1	2	8	9	−1	4
4	FAS Team Under-17	4	1	1	2	6	12	−6	4
5	Jollilads Arsenal FC	4	0	0	4	4	27	−23	0

Source: fas.org.sg
Rules for classification: 1) points; 2) goal difference; 3) number of goals scored; 4) number of wins
(Q) Qualified for the phase indicated

4 February 2007	Paya Lebar Punggol	1-1	FAS Team U-17	Jurong Stadium
17:00 UTC+8		Report

4 February 2007	United World College	4-0	Jollilads Arsenal	United World College
17:00 UTC+8		Report

10 February 2007	Jollilads Arsenal	3-7	Paya Lebar Punggol	Clementi Stadium
17:00 UTC+8		Report

11 February 2007	United World College	0-0	Police FC	United World College
17:00 UTC+8		Report

24 February 2007	Police FC	12-0	Jollilads Arsenal	Jurong Stadium
19:00 UTC+8		Report

25 February 2007	United World College	5-0	FAS Team U-17	United World College
17:00 UTC+8		Report

3 March 2007	FAS Team U-17	1-6	Police FC	Jurong Stadium
19:00 UTC+8		Report

4 March 2007	Paya Lebar Punggol	0-2	United World College	Clementi Stadium
17:00 UTC+8		Report	Rebecca Gaughan 51'; Rebecca Gaughan 65'

10 March 2007	FAS Team U-17	4-1	Jollilads Arsenal	Jurong Stadium
19:00 UTC+8		Report

11 March 2007	Police FC	3-0	Paya Lebar Punggol	Clementi Stadium
17:00 UTC+8		Report

=== Group C ===
Pos	Team	Pld	W	D	L	GF	GA	GD	Pts
1	Arion Women's FC (Q)	4	4	0	0	13	2	+11	12
2	Tiong Bahru FC	4	3	0	1	10	1	+9	9
3	Sporting Westlake FC	4	1	1	2	3	11	−8	4
4	Redhill Rangers FC	4	1	0	3	5	8	−3	3
5	Bishan Arsenal FC 'B'	4	0	1	3	2	11	−9	1

Source: fas.org.sg
Rules for classification: 1) points; 2) goal difference; 3) number of goals scored; 4) number of wins
(Q) Qualified for the phase indicated

3 February 2007	Arion Women's	1-0	Tiong Bahru	Jurong Stadium
17:00 UTC+8		Report

4 February 2007	Redhill Rangers	2-1	Bishan Arsenal 'B'	Jurong Stadium
19:00 UTC+8		Report

11 February 2007	Bishan Arsenal 'B'	1-1	Sporting Westlake	Clementi Stadium
17:00 UTC+8		Report

11 February 2007	Redhill Rangers	2-4	Arion Women's	Clementi Stadium
19:00 UTC+8		Report

25 February 2007	Sporting Westlake	2-1	Redhill Rangers	Jurong Stadium
17:00 UTC+8		Report

25 February 2007	Bishan Arsenal 'B'	0-4	Tiong Bahru	Jurong Stadium
19:00 UTC+8		Report

4 March 2007	Tiong Bahru	5-0	Sporting Westlake	Jurong Stadium
17:00 UTC+8		Report

4 March 2007	Arion Women's	4-0	Bishan Arsenal 'B'	Clementi Stadium
19:00 UTC+8		Report

11 March 2007	Tiong Bahru	1-0	Redhill Rangers	Jurong Stadium
17:00 UTC+8	Masturah Kahad	Report

11 March 2007	Sporting Westlake	0-4	Arion Women's	Jurong Stadium
19:00 UTC+8		Report	Biana Strasser 25'; Angeline Chua 37'; Lim Shiya 40'; Evelyn Tan

== Knock-out Stage ==
=== Semi Finals ===
17 March 2007	Bishan Arsenal 'A'	3-1	Arion Women's	Jurong Town Stadium
19:00 UTC+8	Huraizah Ismail 33'; Doceline Ndjouanang 40'; Huraizah Ismail 49'		Yang Xiao Wen 30'	Referee: Adzhar Adziz

17 March 2007	Police FC	2-2 (2-4 p)	United World College	Clementi Stadium
19:00 UTC+8		Report

=== Finals ===
15 March 2007	Bishan Arsenal 'A'	1-1 (4-5 p)	United World College	Jalan Besar Stadium
17:00 UTC+8	Dianna Thor 19'	Report	Rebecca Gaughan 10'	Referee: P. Pandian; Man of the Match: Sian Williams
	Penalties
	Doceline Ndjouanang (penalty scored); Nurafny Yulianti (penalty missed); Huraizah Ismail (penalty scored); Nurullah Aisyah (penalty missed)		(penalty scored) Johanna Schuch; (penalty scored) Jessica Koortens; (penalty scored) Kelsey Ryan; (penalty missed) Anna Seiz; (penalty scored) Rebecca Gaughan

== See also ==
- Women's Premier League (Singapore)
