= Chris Yip-Au =

Singaporean footballer (born 1992)

Personal information
- Full name: Chris Yip-Au Hew Seem
- Date of birth: 1 October 1994 (age 32)
- Place of birth: Singapore

Team information
- Current team: Seychelles women's (Head Coach)

College career
Years	Team	Apps	(Gls)
2011-12	Victoria Junior College		

Senior career*
Years	Team	Apps	(Gls)
2013-2017	Arion FA/FC		
2019	Monaro Panthers		

International career^{‡}
2013–2019	Singapore	12	(0)

Managerial career
- 2015-19: SportCares
- 2017-18: Singapore U12
- 2019: Monaro Panthers U13
- 2020: Singapore U16
- 2022–2023: Singapore U19
- 2022–2023: Still Aerion
- 2023–present: Seychelles
- * Club domestic league appearances and goals ‡ National team caps and goals as of 25 Sep 2019

Chris Yip-Au Hew Seem (born October 1994) is a Singaporean football professional head coach and former footballer who is currently the head coach of the Seychelles women's national team.

== Early life ==
Yip-Au was born in 1994 in Singapore. She was described as having "been a part of Singapore’s international football setup since she was 14-years-old".

== Education ==
Yip-Au attended Bowen Secondary School and Victoria Junior College in Singapore. After that, she attended Nanyang Technological University in Singapore.

She received her AFC 'A' Diploma license by AFC in August 2025.

== Playing career ==
Yip-Au represented Singapore internationally. She played for the Singapore women's national football team at the 2019 AFF Women's Championship.

== Style of play ==
Yip-Au mainly operated as an attacking player. She has operated as a winger and attacking midfielder.

== Managerial career ==
In 2023, Yip-Au was appointed manager of the Seychelles women's national team. She managed the team during friendly matches against Mali and South Sudan.

== Personal life ==
Yip-Au obtained a United States Soccer Federation coaching license. She has regarded Wales international Jess Fishlock and United States international Tobin Heath as her football idols.
