= Pikul Khueanpet =

Thai footballer (born 1988)

Personal information
- Full name: Pikul Khueanpet
- Date of birth: 20 September 1988 (age 38)
- Place of birth: Chanthaburi, Thailand
- Height: 1.61 m (5 ft 3 1/2 in)
- Position: Midfielder

Team information
- Current team: BG Bundit Asia
- Number: 30

Senior career*
Years	Team	Apps	(Gls)
2019–2025	BG Bundit Asia	3	(0)
2023	→ Royal Aerion (loan)	9	(10)
2026	Still Aerion	7	(3)
2026–	BG Bundit Asia	0	(0)

International career^{‡}
2009–	Thailand	115	(2)
- * Club domestic league appearances and goals ‡ National team caps and goals as of 10 February 2020 (UTC)

Pikul Khueanpet (Thai: พิกุล เขื่อนเพ็ชร; born 20 September 1988) is a Thai international footballer who plays as a midfielder for BG Bundit Asia.

== Club career ==
In August 2023, Pikul Khueanpet signed for Singapore's Women's National League (WNL) club Royal Aerion from Thai club BGC-College of Asian Scholars (BGC-CAS) along with 3 other Thailand national footballers. The club proceed to clinched their first WNL title.

== International goals ==
No.	Date	Venue	Opponent	Score	Result	Competition
1.	3 May 2015	Thống Nhất Stadium, Ho Chi Minh City, Vietnam	Indonesia	6–0	10–1	2015 AFF Women's Championship
