= Waraporn Boonsing =

Thai footballer (born 1990)

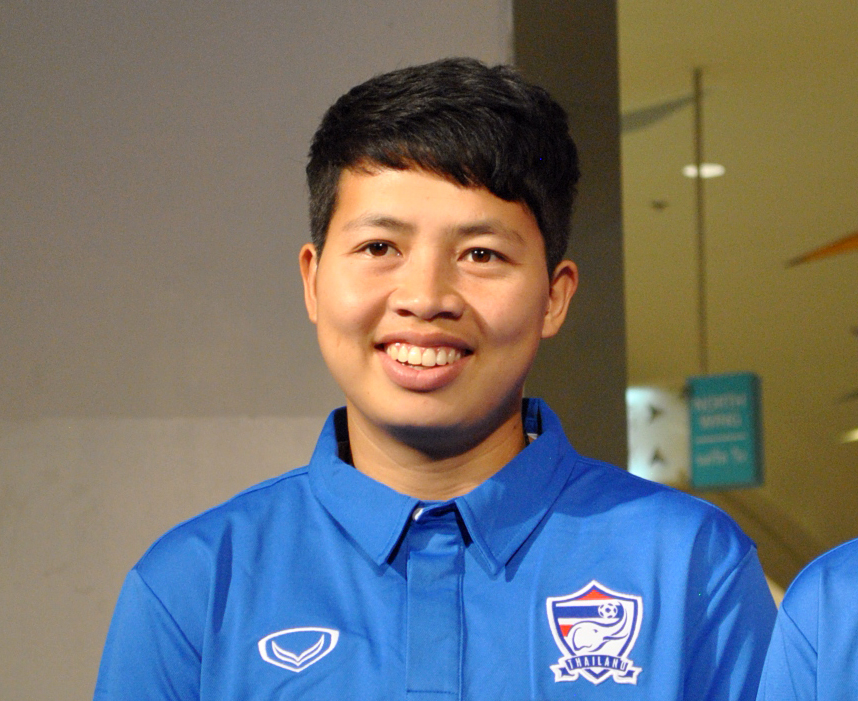

Personal information
- Full name: Waraporn Boonsing
- Date of birth: 16 February 1990 (age 36)
- Place of birth: Sisaket, Thailand
- Height: 1.70 m (5 ft 7 in)
- Position: Goalkeeper

Senior career*
Years	Team	Apps	(Gls)
-2023	BG Bundit Asia		
2023-2024	Royal Aerion		
2024–2025	Taichung Blue Whale	2	(0)

International career^{‡}
2009–	Thailand	155	(0)
- * Club domestic league appearances and goals ‡ National team caps and goals as of 20 June 2019

Waraporn Boonsing (Thai: วราภรณ์ บุญสิงห์; born 16 February 1990) is a Thai female international footballer who plays as a goalkeeper.

In August 2023, Waraporn Boonsing signed for Singapore's Women's National League (WNL) club Royal Aerion from Thai club BGC-College of Asian Scholars (BGC-CAS) along with 3 other Thailand national footballers. The club proceed to clinched their first WNL title.

On 13 August 2024, 2023 Taiwan Mulan Football League champions Taichung Blue Whale announced the signing of Waraporn Boonsing via their social media.
