= Sunisa Srangthaisong =

Thai footballer (born 1988)

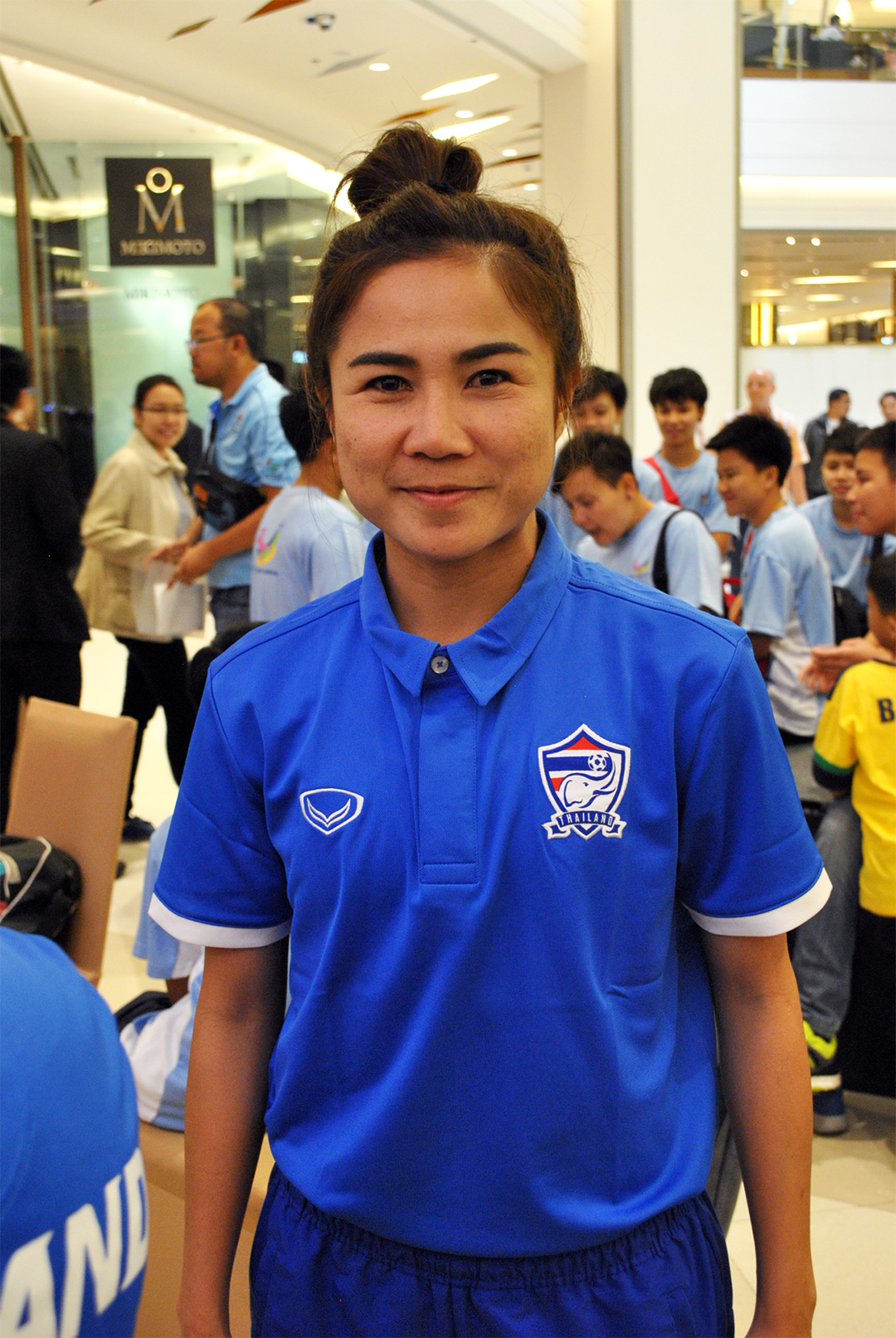

Personal information
- Full name: Sunisa Srangthaisong
- Date of birth: 6 May 1988 (age 38)
- Place of birth: Nakhon Ratchasima, Thailand
- Height: 1.60 m (5 ft 3 in)
- Position: Defender

Team information
- Current team: Still Aerion
- Number: 11

Senior career*
Years	Team	Apps	(Gls)
- BG Bundit Asia
2023	Royal Aerion		
2023	Still Aerion		
2024–2025	BG Bundit Asia	3	(0)
2026–	Still Aerion		

International career^{‡}
2006–	Thailand	152	(15)
- * Club domestic league appearances and goals ‡ National team caps and goals as of 13:30, 12 June 2019 (UTC)

Sunisa Srangthaisong (Thai: สุนิสา สร้างไธสง born 6 May 1988) is a Thai international footballer who plays as a defender. She is currently playing for Still Aerion.

== Club career ==
In August 2023, Sunisa Srangthaisong signed for Singapore's Women's National League (WNL) club Royal Aerion from Thai club BGC-College of Asian Scholars (BGC-CAS) along with 3 other Thailand national footballers. The club proceed to clinched their first WNL title.

Sunisa Srangthaisong is listed in the 2024 roster for Women's Premier League club Still Aerion (Royal Aerion's sister club), which were released in Still Aerion's social media.

== International goals ==
No.	Date	Venue	Opponent	Score	Result	Competition
1.	24 March 2008	80th Birthday Stadium, Nakhon Ratchasima, Thailand	Malaysia	9–0	11–0	2008 AFC Women's Asian Cup qualification
2.	20 March 2011	Kaohsiung National Stadium, Kaohsiung, Taiwan	Chinese Taipei	2–0	3–0	2012 Summer Olympics
3.	27 March 2011	Kaohsiung National Stadium, Kaohsiung, Taiwan	Hong Kong	1–0	4–0	2012 Summer Olympics
4.	21 May 2013	Bangabandhu National Stadium, Dhaka, Bangladesh	Bangladesh	6–0	9–0	2014 AFC Women's Asian Cup qualification
