= Orapin Waenngoen =

Thai footballer (born 1995)

Personal information
- Date of birth: 7 October 1995 (age 31)
- Place of birth: Sisaket, Thailand
- Height: 1.55 m (5 ft 1 in)
- Position: Striker

Team information
- Current team: College of Asian Scholars
- Number: 7

Senior career*
Years	Team	Apps	(Gls)
- College of Asian Scholars
2023	Royal Aerion	9	(35)
2024–	College of Asian Scholars	25	(20)

International career
2019–	Thailand	22	(6)
- Thailand (futsal)
- * Club domestic league appearances and goals

Orapin Waenngoen (born 7 October 1995) is a Thai international footballer who plays as a midfielder for College of Asian Scholars.

She participated at the 2018 AFC Women's Futsal Championship. She was selected for the 2019 FIFA Women's World Cup. On the club level, she plays for BG Bundit Asia.

In August 2023, Orapin Waenngoen signed for Singapore's Women's National League (WNL) club Royal Aerion from Thai club BGC-College of Asian Scholars (BGC-CAS) along with 3 other Thailand national footballers. The club proceed to clinched their first WNL title. Orapin’s stunning 35-goal tally secured her the title of the top scorer.

== International goals ==
Scores and results list Thailand's goal tally first.

No.	Date	Venue	Opponent	Score	Result	Competition
1.	17 August 2019	IPE Chonburi Stadium, Chonburi, Thailand	Singapore	3–0	8–0	2019 AFF Women's Championship
2.	19 August 2019	IPE Chonburi Stadium, Chonburi, Thailand	Timor-Leste	2–0	9–0	2019 AFF Women's Championship
3.	19 August 2019	IPE Chonburi Stadium, Chonburi, Thailand	Timor-Leste	8–0	9–0	2019 AFF Women's Championship
4.	23 August 2019	IPE Chonburi Stadium, Chonburi, Thailand	Malaysia	3–0	7–0	2019 AFF Women's Championship
5.	5 December 2019	Rizal Memorial Stadium, Manila, Philippines	Myanmar	1–0	1–0	2019 Southeast Asian Games
6.	25 January 2020	Mandarthiri Stadium, Mandalay, Myanmar	Myanmar	1–0	2–1	Friendly
7.	1 April 2023	Chonburi Stadium, Chonburi, Thailand	Singapore	1–0	6–0	2024 AFC Women's Olympic Qualifying Tournament
8.	3 May 2023	RSN Stadium, Phnom Penh, Cambodia	Singapore	2–0	4–0	2023 Southeast Asian Games
9.	6 May 2023	RSN Stadium, Phnom Penh, Cambodia	Laos	5–0	6–0	2023 Southeast Asian Games
10.	12 May 2023	RCAF Old Stadium, Phnom Penh, Cambodia	Myanmar	2–0	2–4	2023 Southeast Asian Games
11.	24 October 2025	High Performance Training Center, Bangkok, Thailand	Bangladesh	1–0	3–0	Friendly
12.	9 December 2025	Chonburi Stadium, Chonburi, Thailand	Singapore	2–0	2–0	2025 SEA Games
