= Lion City Sailors FC (women) =

Lion City Sailors Women
- Full name: Lion City Sailors Women Football Club
- Nickname: The Sailors
- Short name: LCSW
- Founded: 1997; 29 years ago as Home United Women; 2020; 6 years ago as Lion City Sailors Women
- Ground: Bishan Stadium; Jalan Besar Stadium
- Capacity: 6,000; 7,100
- Owner: Sea Limited
- Chairman: Forrest Li
- Head coach: Daniel Ong
- League: Women's Premier League
- 2026: Women's Premier League, 1st of 9
- Website: www.lioncitysailorsfc.sg
| Home colours | Away colours | Third colours |

The Lion City Sailors Women Football Club, commonly referred to as LCS Women, is a Singaporean professional women's football club based in Bishan. The club is affiliated with Lion City Sailors and currently playing in the Women's Premier League (WPL). The Sailors have won three consecutives league titles, in 2022, 2023 and 2024.

== History ==
The club was founded as Home United in 1997. In February 2020, the club was privatised by Forrest Li, who owns tech conglomerate Sea Limited, and revamped as Lion City Sailors. League debut as LCS Women was delayed by the COVID-19 pandemic in Singapore. LCS Women made debut in the 2022 season and went on to win the title with 10 victories and two draws. It also won the 2023 season's championship unbeaten with 17 victories and 1 draw. Consequentially, they were selected as Singapore's representative for the 2024–25 AFC Women's Champions League preliminary stage. LCS Women were drawn in Group B alongside Odisha and Etihad. However, LCS Women lost both matches, thus failing to progress. On 24 June 2024, LCS Women were defeated by Geylang International Women 2–1, ending their unbeaten streak since the start of the 2022 season. They were unbeaten for 37 matches, with 34 victories and 3 draws. On 15 September 2024, LCS Women won their third consecutive Women’s Premier League title after a 6–0 victory over Still Aerion.

== Current squad ==
As of 11 November 2025

Note: Flags indicate national team as defined under FIFA eligibility rules; some limited exceptions apply. Players may hold more than one non-FIFA nationality.

| No. | Pos. | Nation | Player |
|---|---|---|---|
| 1 | GK | SGP | Izairida Shakira |
| 2 | MF | CHN | Zhang Qiaoling |
| 3 | DF | CHN | Wang Jiaxin |
| 4 | DF | SGP | Umairah Hamdan (captain) |
| 5 | DF | SGP | Irsalina Irwan |
| 6 | FW | JPN | Eri Kitagawa |
| 7 | MF | IND | Rivka Ramji |
| 8 | DF | SGP | Syazwani Ruzi |
| 9 | FW | SGP | Raeka Ee |
| 10 | FW | SGP | Farah Nurzahirah |
| 11 | MF | JPN | Ami Takeuchi |
| 12 | MF | IND | Anaya Sehgal |
| 13 | MF | SGP | Ho Hui Xin |
| 14 | DF | JPN | Hikaru Shibusawa |
| 15 | MF | SGP | Qarissa Putri |

| No. | Pos. | Nation | Player |
|---|---|---|---|
| 17 | DF | SGP | Khairunnisa Anwar |
| 20 | FW | SGP | Dorcas Chu |
| 22 | GK | SGP | Beatrice Tan |
| 23 | MF | SGP | Sarah Zu'risqha |
| 24 | MF | SGP | Nurhidayu Naszri |
| 27 | DF | SGP | Tia Foong |
| 28 | FW | MAS | Putri Alyiah Seow |
| 32 | MF | SGP | Nur Ain Salleh |
| 33 | MF | SGP | Amelia Ng |
| 51 | GK | SGP | Hazel Lim |
| 76 | DF | SGP | Tyan Foong |
| 77 | MF | SGP | Dhaniyah Qasimah |
| 80 | DF | SGP | Siti Nurerwadah Erwan |
| 90 | MF | SGP | Wan Nashirah Mohammed |
| 99 | GK | SGP | Alysha Nasrina |

== Personal awards ==
- WPL Player of the Year
  - (Singapore) Izzati Rosni (2022)
- WPL Young Player of the Year
  - (Singapore) Izzati Rosni (2022)
- WPL Coach of the Year
  - (Singapore) Yeong Sheau Shyan (2022)
  - (Singapore) Yeong Sheau Shyan (2023)
- WPL Goal of the Year
  - (Singapore) Izzati Rosni (2022)
- WPL Top Scorer
  - (Singapore) Izzati Rosni (2022)
- WPL Golden Glove
  - (Singapore) Izairida Shakira (2022)
- Golden Globe Award
  - (Singapore) Beatrice Tan (2022)

== Continental record ==
| Season | Competition | Round | Opponent | Home | Away | Aggregate |
|---|---|---|---|---|---|---|
| 2024–25 | AFC Women's Champions League | Preliminary stage | (India) Odisha | 1–4 | | 3rd |
| 2024–25 | AFC Women's Champions League | Preliminary stage | (Jordan) Etihad | 0–5 | | 3rd |
| 2025–26 | AFC Women's Champions League | Preliminary stage | (Jordan) Etihad | 2–0 | | 1st |
| 2025–26 | AFC Women's Champions League | Preliminary stage | (Malaysia) Kelana United | 3–1 | | 1st |
| 2025–26 | AFC Women's Champions League | Preliminary stage | (Kyrgyzstan) Sdyushor SI–Asiagoal | 3–0 | | 1st |
| 2025–26 | AFC Women's Champions League | Group stage | (Australia) Melbourne City | 0–5 | | 4th |
| 2025–26 | AFC Women's Champions League | Group stage | (Vietnam) Hồ Chí Minh City | 0–2 | | 4th |
| 2025–26 | AFC Women's Champions League | Group stage | (Philippines) Stallion Laguna | 0–5 | | 4th |

== Honours ==
=== League ===
- Women's Premier League
  - Winners (4): 2022, 2023, 2024, 2026
  - Runners-up (5): 2001, 2002, 2003, 2004, 2019

== See also ==
- Lion City Sailors (Men's team)
