= Aerion WFC =

Singaporean women's football club

- Full name: Aerion Women's Football Club
- Short name: Aerion WFC
- Founded: 2005
- President: Pamela Kong
- Head coach: Jeremy Chiang
- League: Women's Premier League
- 2026: WPL, 3rd of 9
- Website: theaerion.com
Home colours	Away colours

Aerion Women's Football Club is a professional women's football club based in the north-east of Singapore. The club was established in 2005 by a group of 5 footballers who wanted to promote women's football in the country. Aerion participates as Still Aerion in the Women's Premier League and as Royal Arion in the Women's National League.

The first Singapore's all-women football club fields teams in the Women's Premier League, Women's National League and has a football academy.

== History ==
Arion Women's Football Club was established by Yeong Sheau Shyan and her peers in 2005. It later became Arion Football Academy (Arion FA) in 2012. The name Arion was derived from a character in Greek mythology. Arion has adopted Better, Stronger, Braver as its motto.

The club started to play in the Women's Premier League (WPL) in 2006. Arion FA started to send their B team to play in Women's National League (WNL) in 2017, finishing 8th out of 9 teams.

Arion's first team was renamed as Still Aerion Women's FC and Royal Arion WFC was formed in 2019. Both Still Aerion and Royal Arion competed in the 2019 Women's National League. Still Aerion finished as third and was promoted back to the Premier League, while Royal Arion finished 9th.

Thailand national footballers Orapin Waenngoen, Sunisa Srangthaisong, Pikul Khueanpet and Waraporn Boonsing signed for Royal Arion in August 2023. Royal Aerion clinched their first WNL title by beating Mattar Sailors in the final on 15 October 2023. Royal Arion became the fifth winner in as many editions of the WNL, following Changi Village SRC (2017), Tampines Changkat CSC (2018), Tanjong Pagar United (2019), and Police Sports Association (2022). Orapin’s stunning 35-goal tally secured her the title of the top scorer.

In 2026, Football Association of Singapore (FAS) introduced a series of structural and regulatory adjustments designed to strengthen competition and provide clearer pathways for player development to the 2026 season of both Women's Premier League and National League. Apart from the return of promotion and relegation between the Premier and National Leagues, the 2026 season will also see the introduction of WPL B-teams to allow WPL clubs fielding a developmental squad in the WNL. Clubs may include up to five B-team players in their match-day squad. Only Lion City Sailors and Still Aerion will be sending a 'B' team for the 2026 Women's National League. Royal Arion did not participate in the 2026 WNL.

== Current Squad ==
=== Still Aerion 'A' ===
Note: Flags indicate national team as defined under FIFA eligibility rules; some limited exceptions apply. Players may hold more than one non-FIFA nationality.

No.	Pos.	Nation	Player
1	GK	SGP	Hazel Lim
3	DF	SGP	Angelyn Pang
4	MF	SGP	Janet Tan
5	MF	SGP	Bhanu Krishnasamy
6	DF	SGP	Fonda Chai (C)
7	MF	THA	Pikul Khueanpet
8	MF	SGP	Noralinda Wahab
9	FW	MEX	Andrea Moska
10	FW	SGP	Nicole Lim
11	DF	THA	Sunisa Srangthaisong
12	MF	SGP	Nurul Unaisah
14	DF	SGP	Calista Dodson

No.	Pos.	Nation	Player
15	DF	SGP	Bernice Lim
17	MF	USA	Mikayla Simons
18	FW	SGP	Anna Seng
19	MF	SGP	Ayla Chin
21	FW	SGP	Zoey Chua
22	GK	SGP	Lutfiah Hannah
23	MF	SGP	Nur Afiqah bte Omar
25	MF	SGP	Rachel Chan
27	FW	SGP	Reneelyn Riddles Sison
28	FW	AUS	Isabella Rose Edwards
45	DF	SGP	Dini Dannisha

Source: @stillaerionwfc/IG

=== Still Aerion 'B' ===
Note: Flags indicate national team as defined under FIFA eligibility rules; some limited exceptions apply. Players may hold more than one non-FIFA nationality.

No.	Pos.	Nation	Player
52		SGP	Ashley Tan
58	GK	SGP	Pamela Kong
60		SGP	Putri Alyssa Rianna
64	DF	SGP	Jasmine Kua
71		SGP	Putri Noor Lyshanty
73		SGP	Alesha Dania Puteri
77		SGP	Nadirah
86	MF	SGP	Siti
88		SGP	Danelynn Ding

No.	Pos.	Nation	Player
89		SGP	Adriana
90		SGP	Yang Shuting
91	FW	SGP	Hannah Tasha Abdullahsiraj
92	MF	SGP	Natasha Kaur
96	MF	SGP	Zhang Keqing
98		SGP	Linnèa
99		SGP	Libby
—		SGP	Nadia
—		SGP	Miska

Source: @stillaerionwfc/IG

== Head coaches ==
=== Still Aerion ===
Head coach	Career	Achievements
(Singapore) Li Jing	2009	
(Singapore) Yeong Sheau Shyan	2017–2020	2017 Coach of the Year
(Singapore) Hyrizan Jufri	2022	
(Singapore) Chris Yip-Au	2023	
(Singapore) Jeremy Chiang	2024–present	2025 Coach of the Year

=== Royal Arion ===
Head coach	Career	Achievements
(Singapore) Chen Huixing	2025	2025 FAS Women's National League

== Honours ==
=== Arion Women's / Still Aerion ===
- Women's Premier League

Runners-up (2): 2008, 2016, 2025

- Women's Challenge Cup

Champion (1): 2009
Runners-up (2): 2010, 2019

=== Royal Arion ===
- Women's National League

Champion (1): 2023

== Records ==
=== Arion Women's / Still Aerion ===
==== Leagues ====
Season	League	Pos	Pld	W	D	L	GF	GA	GD	Pts
2006	Women's Premier League	3rd	10	4	2	4	13	18	-5	14
2007	Women's Premier League	7th	7	4	2	1	15	7	8	14
2008	Women's Premier League	2nd	12	5	5	2	30	14	16	20
2009	Women's Premier League	3rd	5	3	0	2	18	7	11	9
2010	Women's Premier League	4th	0	0	0	0	0	0	0	0
2011	Women's Premier League	6th	10	1	3	6	2	13	-11	6
2012	Women's Premier League	6th	14	4	2	8	29	37	-8	14
2013	Women's Premier League	4th	15	9	1	5	49	25	24	28
2014	Women's Premier League	6th	16	5	8	3	17	15	2	23
2015	Women's Premier League	3rd	14	7	4	3	22	12	10	25
2016	Women's Premier League	2nd	20	16	1	3	52	10	42	49
2017	Women's Premier League	4th	12	2	3	7	7	19	-12	9
2018	Did not participate									
2019	Women's National League	3rd	9	6	1	2	53	7	46	19 (P)
2020	Competition not held due to Covid-19 Pandemic									
2021	Competition not held due to Covid-19 Pandemic									
2022	Women's Premier League	6th	12	3	1	8	11	29	-18	10
2023	Women's Premier League	7th	18	6	2	10	22	30	-8	20
2024	Women's Premier League	4th	16	8	4	4	38	27	+11	28
2025	Women's Premier League	2nd	16	12	2	2	57	21	+36	38
2026	Women's Premier League	3rd	16	11	1	4	52	27	+25	34

==== Cups ====
Season	Cup	Progress
2006	Women's Challenge Cup	Group Stage
2007	Women's Challenge Cup	Semi-final
2008	Women's Challenge Cup	
2009	Women's Challenge Cup	Champions
2010	Women's Challenge Cup	Runners-up
2011	Women's Challenge Cup	
2012	Women's Challenge Cup	Group Stage
2013	Women's Challenge Cup	Third
2014	Women's Challenge Cup	
2015	Women's Challenge Cup	Fourth
2016	Women's Challenge Cup	Third
2017	Women's Challenge Cup	
2018	Women's Challenge Cup	Group Stage
2019	Women's Challenge Cup	Runners-up

=== Royal Arion / Still Aerion 'B' ===
==== Leagues ====
Season	League	Pos	Pld	W	D	L	GF	GA	GD	Pts	Remarks
2017	Women's National League	8th	8	1	1	6	6	16	-10	4	
2018	Did not participate										
2019	Women's National League	9th	9	1	1	7	4	41	-37	4	
2020	Competition not held due to Covid-19 Pandemic										
2021	Competition not held due to Covid-19 Pandemic										
2022	Women's National League (Group A)	1st	3	2	1	0	4	1	3	7 (Q)	Third
2023	Women's National League	1st	7	7	0	0	49	0	49	21 (Q)	Champions
2024	Women's National League	1st	6	5	1	0	12	3	+9	16 (Q)	Third
2025	Women's National League	6th	12	2	0	10	14	31	-17	6	
2026	Women's National League	3rd	13	9	0	4	30	15	15	27	
