= Yishun Stadium =

Multi-purpose stadium in Yishun, Singapore

- Pusat Sukan Yishun (Malay) 杨厝港体育场 (Chinese) யீஷூன் விளையாட்டரங்கம் (Tamil)
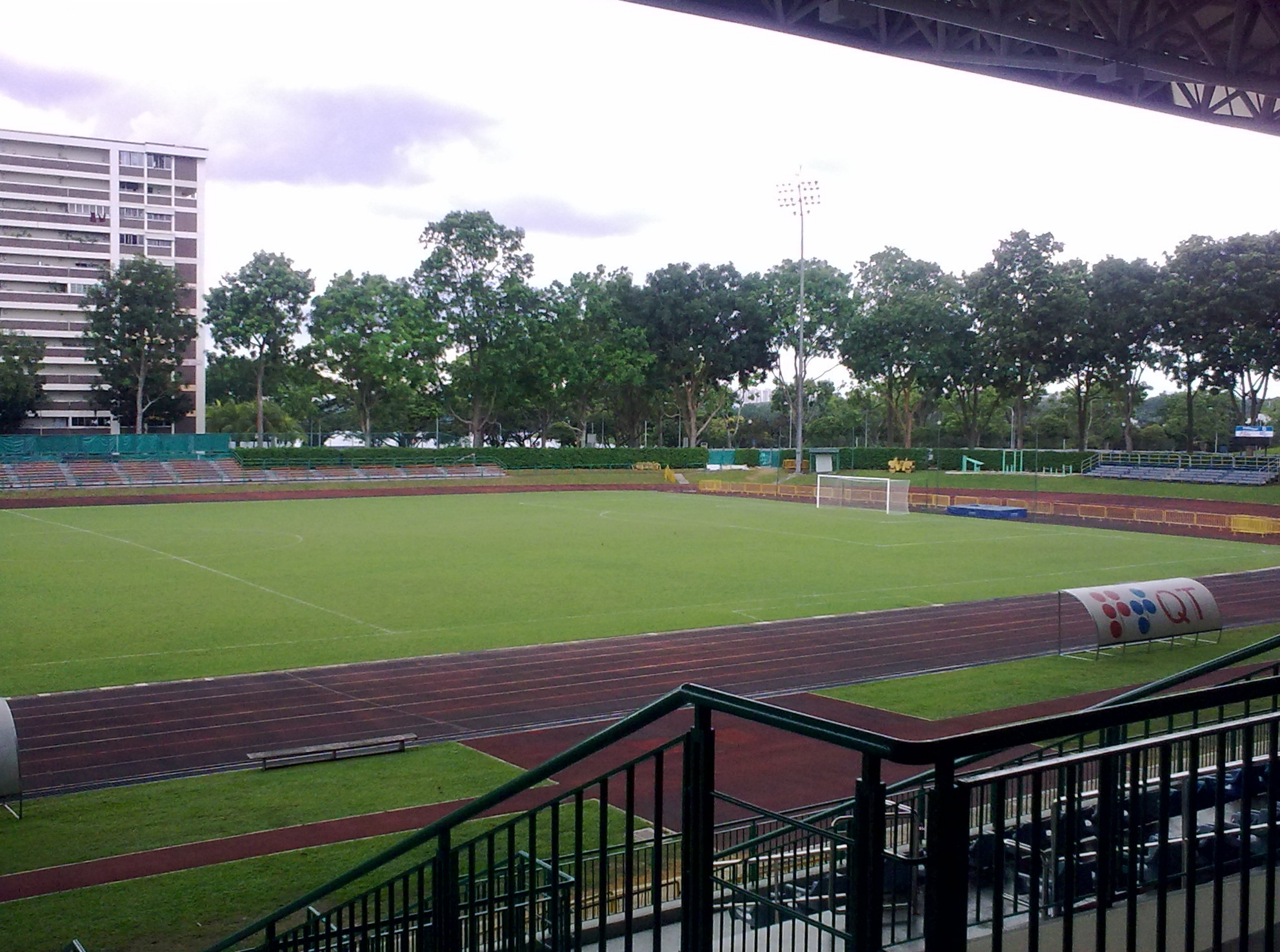
- Yishun Stadium
- Interactive map of Yishun Stadium
- Full name: Yishun ActiveSG Stadium
- Address: 103 Yishun Avenue 1, Singapore 769131
- Location: Yishun, Singapore
- Coordinates: 1.412389°N 103.832334°E
- Owner: Sport Singapore
- Operator: Sport Singapore
- Capacity: 3,400
- Surface: Grass
- Public transit: NS14 Khatib

Construction
- Opened: 2 January 1992; 34 years ago
- Renovated: 2024

Tenants
- Sembawang Rangers (1996–2003); Sporting Afrique (2006); Super Reds FC (2007–2009); Beijing Guoan Talent Singapore FC (2010); Harimau Muda A (2012); Home United (2015)

Yishun Stadium is a multi-purpose stadium located in Yishun, Singapore. It formerly served as the home ground of several Singapore Premier League football clubs, including Sembawang Rangers, Sporting Afrique, Super Reds FC, Beijing Guoan Talent Singapore FC, Harimau Muda A, and Home United. The stadium has also hosted football matches for various league competitions organised by the Football Association of Singapore (FAS).

The stadium is managed by Sport Singapore, and like most stadiums in Singapore, it is generally open to the public daily from 4.30am till 9.30pm, unless exclusively booked.

It has also occasionally hosted political rallies during Singapore's general elections, including those organised by the ruling People's Action Party (PAP) and opposition parties such as the Workers' Party (WP).

== History ==
Workers' Party general election rally at Yishun Stadium, 2011

Yishun Stadium forms part of the Yishun Sport Centre, a community sports facility that also comprises Yishun Sports Hall and Yishun Swimming Complex. Unlike many sport centres in Singapore, the swimming complex is located separately from the stadium and sports hall, rather than being within the same vicinity.

By 1988, plans for the sports centre had been developed, with a construction tender called shortly thereafter. Following its completion, the Singapore Sports Council took over the stadium on 15 November 1991, and it opened to the public on 2 January 1992.

The stadium subsequently served as the home ground of several football clubs competing in the Singapore Premier League. From 1996 to 2003, it was home to Sembawang Rangers, until the club's dissolution. During the 2015 S.League season, Home United temporarily relocated to Yishun Stadium from its usual home ground at Bishan Stadium.

The stadium has also served as the home ground of several foreign clubs playing in that same league. These include Sporting Afrique during the 2006 S.League season, Yishun Super Reds from 2007 to 2009, Beijing Guoan Talent during the 2010 S.League season, and Harimau Muda A during the 2012 S.League season.

In 2024, the stadium underwent renovation works, including the resurfacing of its running track. In the same year, the Urban Redevelopment Authority earmarked Yishun Sports Centre for redevelopment, with the possibility of expanding the site to accommodate additional sports and recreational facilities in anticipation of new public housing in the neighbouring Chencharu estate. The redevelopment is expected to be completed by 2030.

== Facilities & structures ==
The stadium has a seating capacity of 3,400, comprising 2,000 in the grandstand, 1,000 semi-permanent and 400 portable seats. Its facilities include a football field, an eight lane running track, several athletic facilities, and a fitness corner.

== International fixtures ==
To date, only two international matches have been played at the stadium due to its limited seating capacity. Most international matches in Singapore are instead held at Jalan Besar Stadium or the National Stadium.

Date	Competition	Team	Score	Team
13 November 2014	Friendly	Singapore	2–0	Laos
17 November 2014	Friendly	Singapore	4–2	Cambodia

== See also ==
- List of stadiums in Singapore
