= Choa Chu Kang Stadium =

Sports complex in Singapore

- 蔡厝港体育场
- Interactive map of Choa Chu Kang Stadium
- Full name: Choa Chu Kang ActiveSG stadium
- Address: 1 Choa Chu Kang Street 53, Singapore 689236
- Location: Yew Tee, Singapore
- Coordinates: 1°23′28″N 103°44′57″E
- Owner: Sport Singapore
- Capacity: 4,268
- Surface: Grass
- Scoreboard: Yes
- Public transit: NS4 BP1 JS1 Choa Chu Kang; NS5 Yew Tee

Construction
- Opened: 1 March 2001; 25 years ago

Tenant
- Warriors (2001–2018)

The Choa Chu Kang Stadium (also known as the CCK Stadium) is part of the Choa Chu Kang Sports and Recreation complex located in Choa Chu Kang, Singapore. The international competition standard, multi-sport facility supports a range of sports and community functions. It was opened in the year 2001. The stadium has a capacity of 4,268 people.

== History ==
Choa Chu Kang stadium served as the home stadium from its opening until 2018 for Warriors S.League games. In July 2019, Inter Milan used Choa Chu Kang Stadium as its training base for 2019 International Champions Cup pre-season match against Manchester United. In 2024, all 72 matches of the 2024 Women's Premier League (WPL) were played at the stadium. After the opening matchday, the pitch was criticised for its poor condition. It was also a temporary training ground for Albirex Niigata (S) men's and youth teams due to the returfing at Jurong East Stadium.

== Facilities and structures ==
The football pitch consists of a self-watering "cell-system" installation approved by FIFA for international competition. Other international competition standard facilities include a 50m Olympic swimming pool, a running track and athletics facilities, and a hall supporting indoor sports. The public can also access further outdoor facilities, such as tennis courts, petanque sandpits, street soccer pitches, basketball and badminton courts, a gym and a dance training room.

== Awards ==
Identified as an exemplary community and competition sports facility in Singapore, the Choa Chu Kang Sport Complex and Stadium won a Singapore Institute of Architects Merit Award in 2002, and a CIDB Construction Excellence Award in 2003. The design was cited in particular for its entry experience, public concourse, and use of colour, and is a representative example of the architect Alex Ford.

== Transport ==
The stadium is four bus stops away from Choa Chu Kang MRT/LRT station. Visitors can take the bus 307 from the Choa Chu Kang Bus Interchange to access the stadium. It is also four bus stops away from Yew Tee MRT station.

== International fixtures ==
Men's football
| Date | Competition | Team | Score | Team |
|---|---|---|---|---|
| 7 January 2007 | Friendly | Singapore | 4–1 | Philippines |
| 16 October 2012 | Friendly | Singapore | 2–0 | India |

Women's football
| Date | Competition | Team | Score | Team |
|---|---|---|---|---|
| 15 June 2025 | Friendly | Singapore | | Hong Kong |

== See also ==
- List of stadiums in Singapore
