= 2026–27 in Singaporean football =

2025 competitive association football season in Singapore

Football in Singapore
- Season: 2026–27

Men's football
- Singapore Premier League: TBD
- Premier League 2: TBD
- Football League 1: TBD
- Football League 2: TBD
- Island Wide League: Tiong Bahru

Women's football
- Women's Premier League: Lion City Sailors
- Women's National League: Lion City Sailors 'B'

An overview of the 2026–27 season of the competitive association football season in Singapore.

In response to changes in Asian Football Confederation (AFC) Club Competitions and potential FIFA International Calendar amendments, FAS announced that the Singapore Premier League calendar will undergo a two-year transition process. Singapore Premier League calendar has been aligned with AFC Club Competitions since the 2025-26 season.

Competitions involving Singapore Football League's and Women's teams remain unchanged.

== National teams ==
=== Singapore men's national football team ===
==== Results and fixtures ====
===== Friendlies =====
26 March 2026 Friendly	Faroe Islands	Cancelled	Singapore	Dubai, United Arab Emirates
17:00 UTC+4				Stadium: Rashid Stadium
Note: Match cancelled due to ongoing conflict in Middle East

31 May 2026 Friendly	Singapore	4–0	Mongolia	Jalan Besar, Singapore
19:30 UTC+8	Baharudin 22' (pen.); Song 38'; Orkhon 58' (o.g.); I. Fandi 87'			Stadium: Jalan Besar Stadium; Attendance: 4,324; Referee: Kim Woo-sung (South Korea)

5 June 2026 Friendly	Singapore	1–2	China	Jalan Besar, Singapore
19:30 UTC+8	I. Fandi 76'	Report	Serginho 16'; Zhang Yuning 41' (pen.)	Stadium: Jalan Besar Stadium; Attendance: 4,688; Referee: Rustam Lutfullin (Uzbekistan)

9 July 2026 Training camp	FC Ryukyu (Japan)	2–0	Singapore	Okinawa, Japan
18:00 UTC+8	Yu Tomidokoro; Yosuke Ueno	Report		Stadium: Okinawa Athletic Park Stadium
Note: Training camp in Okinawa, Japan from 6 to 17 July 2026.

13 July 2026 Training camp	Okinawa SV (Japan)	3–2	Singapore	Okinawa, Japan
19:00 UTC+8	Tatsuya Murata 22'; Takahashi Kenshiro 26', 40'	Report	3'; 88'	Stadium: Okinawa Athletic Park Stadium
Note: Training camp in Okinawa, Japan from 6 to 17 July 2026.

16 July 2026 Training camp	Albirex Niigata (Japan)	0-2 - (Note: The match is a closed-door preparation match against Albirex Niigata. Results are not available.)	Singapore	Okinawa, Japan
--:-- UTC+8				Stadium: Okinawa Athletic Park Stadium
Note: Training camp in Okinawa, Japan from 6 to 17 July 2026.

13 November 2026 Mizuho Blue Challenge	Singapore	1-4	Paraguay	Kallang, Singapore
20:00 UTC+8				Stadium: National Stadium
Note: Mizuho Blue Challenge - The Kallang Football Series Singapore

17 November 2026 Mizuho Blue Challenge	Singapore	0-7	Brazil	Kallang, Singapore
18:00 UTC+8				Stadium: National Stadium
Note: Mizuho Blue Challenge - The Kallang Football Series Singapore

===== 2027 AFC Asian Cup qualification =====
====== Group C ======
Pos	Team	Pld	W	D	L	GF	GA	GD	Pts	Qualification	(Singapore)	(Hong Kong)	(Bangladesh)	(India)
1	Singapore	6	4	2	0	8	4	+4	14	2027 AFC Asian Cup		0–0	1–0	1–1
2	Hong Kong	6	2	2	2	8	8	0	8		1–2		1–1	1–0
3	Bangladesh	6	1	2	3	6	8	−2	5		1–2	3–4		1–0
4	India	6	1	2	3	4	6	−2	5		1–2	2–1	0–0	

Source: AFC
Legend: Blue = home team win; Yellow = draw; Red = away team win.
Rules for classification: Tiebreakers

2026

31 March 2026	Singapore	1–0	Bangladesh	Kallang, Singapore
20:00 UTC+8	H. Stewart 31'	Report; Report (AFC)		Stadium: National Stadium; Attendance: 30,105; Referee: Ben Abraham (Australia)

===== 2027 AFC Asian Cup =====
Pos	Team	Pld	W	D	L	GF	GA	GD	Pts	Qualification
1	Australia	0	0	0	0	0	0	0	0	Advance to knockout stage
2	Tajikistan	0	0	0	0	0	0	0	0	Advance to knockout stage
3	Iraq	0	0	0	0	0	0	0	0	Possible knockout stage based on ranking
4	Singapore	0	0	0	0	0	0	0	0	

First match(es) will be played: December 2027. Source:

9 January 2027 Match 7	Australia	v	Singapore	Al Khobar, Saudi Arabia
				Stadium: Aramco Stadium

14 January 2027 Match 19	Singapore	v	Tajikistan	Riyadh, Saudi Arabia
				Stadium: Imam Mohammed Ibn Saud University Stadium

19 January 2027 Match 32	Iraq	v	Singapore	Al Khobar, Saudi Arabia
				Stadium: Aramco Stadium

===== 2026 FIFA ASEAN Cup =====
The inaugural edition of FIFA ASEAN Cup will be played in the 21 September to 6 October 2026 international window. FIFA is expected to formalise the competition and share further details by 1 June 2026.

====== Group A ======
Pos	Team	Pld	W	D	L	GF	GA	GD	Pts	Qualification
1	Indonesia (H)	3	2	1	0	11	2	+9	7 (Note: Tied on head-to-head result (Malaysia 0–0 Indonesia) and total goal difference (+9), ranked on total goals scored.)	Advance to final
2	Malaysia	3	2	1	0	9	0	+9	7	Advance to bronze final
3	Singapore	3	1	0	2	1	8	−7	3	
4	Bangladesh	3	0	0	3	2	13	−11	0	

Source: FIFA
(H) Hosts
Notes:

25 September 2026	Indonesia	2–0	Singapore	Jakarta
19:00	Oratmangoen 13'; Romeny 74' (pen.)	Report		Stadium: Gelora Bung Karno Stadium; Attendance: 38,702; Referee: Rustam Lutfullin (Uzbekistan)

28 September 2026	Singapore	1–0	Bangladesh	Jakarta
15:00	H. Stewart 35'	Report		Stadium: Gelora Bung Karno Stadium; Referee: Mongkolchai Pechsri (Thailand)

1 October 2026	Malaysia	6–0	Singapore	Bandung
18:30	Bérgson 8' (pen.), 62', 90+3'; Wilkin 26'; Josué 76'; Bashah 87'	Report		Stadium: Si Jalak Harupat Stadium; Referee: Kim Jong-hyeok (South Korea)

===== 2026 ASEAN Championship =====
====== Group A ======
Pos	Team	Pld	W	D	L	GF	GA	GD	Pts	Qualification
1	Vietnam	4	3	1	0	13	1	+12	10	Advance to knockout stage
2	Singapore	4	2	2	0	5	2	+3	8	Advance to knockout stage
3	Indonesia	4	2	1	1	9	5	+4	7	
4	Cambodia	4	1	0	3	6	10	−4	3	
5	Timor-Leste	4	0	0	4	0	15	−15	0	

Source: ASEAN United

24 July 2026
19:00 UTC+7

Cambodia	1–2	Singapore
Sovann 55'	Report	Shawal 22'; Ilhan 90+11'

Morodok Techo National Stadium, Phnom Penh
Attendance: 27,790
Referee: Koji Takasaki (Japan)
27 July 2026
19:00 UTC+8

Singapore	2–0	Timor-Leste
Ilhan 41'; Song Ui-young 56'	Report

Jalan Besar Stadium, Kallang
Attendance: 4,665
Referee: Salman Falahi (Qatar)
31 July 2026
20:00 UTC+7

Vietnam	0–0	Singapore
	Report

Mỹ Đình National Stadium, Hanoi
Attendance: 31,569
Referee: Hiroki Kasahara (Japan)
7 August 2026
21:00 UTC+8

Singapore	1–1	Indonesia
Ilhan 66'	Report	Oratmangoen 47'

Jalan Besar Stadium, Kallang
Attendance: 5,113
Referee: Abdullah Salim Khalfan Al-Amouri (Oman)

====== Knockout stage ======
Semi-finals

15 August 2026
21:00 UTC+8

Singapore	1–3	Thailand
Ilhan 84'	Report	Teerasak 13', 26'; Seksan 51'

Jalan Besar Stadium, Kallang
Attendance: 5,358
Referee: Mahmood Al-Majarafi (Oman)
18 August 2026
20:00 UTC+7

Thailand	1–2	Singapore
Kakana 61' (pen.)	Report	H. Stewart 45'; Pansa 65' (o.g.)

Rajamangala Stadium, Bangkok
Attendance: 10,802
Referee: Kim Woo-sung (South Korea)

Thailand won 4–3 on aggregate.

=== Singapore women's national football team ===
==== Results and fixtures ====
===== Friendlies =====
3 June 2026 Friendly	Singapore	2–0	Indonesia	Bandung, Indonesia
20:00 UTC+8	Danelle Tan 10'; Nicole Lim 22'			Stadium: Arcamanik Stadium

6 June 2026 Friendly	Singapore	0–5	Cambodia	Bandung, Indonesia
19:00 UTC+8		Report	Hok Saody 13', 15'; Ti Samnang; Yon Yoeurn 78'; Vibol Serysitha 84'	Stadium: Arcamanik Stadium

===== 2026 AFF Women's Cup =====
====== Group A ======
Pos	Team	Pld	W	D	L	GF	GA	GD	Pts	Qualification
1	Singapore	2	1	1	0	4	2	+2	4	Qualified for Knockout stage
2	Laos	2	0	2	0	2	2	0	2	Qualified for Knockout stage
3	Malaysia (H)	2	0	1	1	2	4	−2	1	

Source: aseanfootball.org
Rules for classification: Group stage tiebreakers
(H) Hosts

13 July 2026	Singapore	1–1	Laos	Kuala Lumpur, Malaysia
20:45 UTC+8	Tan 47'	Report	Anna 41'	Stadium: Kuala Lumpur Stadium; Referee: Bùi Thị Thu Trang (Vietnam)

16 July 2026	Malaysia	1–3	Singapore	Kuala Lumpur, Malaysia
16:45 UTC+8	Henrietta 58'	Report	Suresh 12'; Tan 44', 72' (pen.)	Stadium: Kuala Lumpur Stadium; Referee: Pansa Chaisanit (Thailand)

====== Knockout stage ======
Semi-finals

19 July 2026	Singapore	0–2	Indonesia	Kuala Lumpur, Malaysia
20:45 UTC+8		Report	Gea 68'; Remini 80'	Stadium: Kuala Lumpur Stadium; Referee: Asaka Koizumi (Japan)

Third place

22 July 2026	Cambodia	1–1 (3–4 p)	Singapore	Kuala Lumpur, Malaysia
16:45 UTC+8	Vipha 70' (pen.)	Report	Tan 24'	Stadium: Kuala Lumpur Stadium; Referee: Jon Mick Pineda (Philippines)
	Penalties
	Maysam (penalty scored); Vipha (penalty scored); Serysitha (penalty missed); Samnang (penalty scored); Sovannomy (penalty missed)		(penalty scored) Mulan; (penalty missed) Li Xian; (penalty scored) Ruzi; (penalty scored) Farah; (penalty scored) Sarah

Note: Singapore has qualified for the 2027 ASEAN Women's Championship.

== AFC competitions ==
=== AFC Champions League Two ===
==== Group phase ====
===== Lion City Sailors =====
Group F

Pos	Team	Pld	W	D	L	GF	GA	GD	Pts	Qualification
1	(Singapore) Lion City Sailors	4	3	1	0	9	1	+8	10	Advance to round of 16
2	(Thailand) BG Pathum United	4	2	1	1	9	4	+5	7	Advance to round of 16
3	(Australia) Adelaide United	4	2	0	2	5	8	−3	6	
4	(Hong Kong) Tai Po (E)	4	0	0	4	1	11	−10	0	

Updated to match(es) played on 5 November 2026. Source: ACL2
Rules for classification: Tiebreakers
(E) Eliminated

17 Sep 2026 MD1	Lion City Sailors (Singapore)	1-1	(Thailand) BG Pathum United	Jalan Besar, Singapore
18:00 UTC+8	Nikolić 25' (o.g.)	Report	Gustavsson 51'	Stadium: Jalan Besar Stadium; Attendance: 1,853; Referee: Resul Mämmedow (Turkmenistan)

15 Oct 2026 MD2	Tai Po (Hong Kong)	0–1	(Singapore) Lion City Sailors	Mong Kok, Hong Kong
18:00 UTC+8		Report	Phaeton 48'	Stadium: Mong Kok Stadium; Attendance: 976; Referee: Chae Sang-hyeop (South Korea)

29 Oct 2026 MD3	Adelaide United (Australia)	0–2	(Singapore) Lion City Sailors	Adelaide, Australia
18:15 UTC+9:30		Report	Gomes 80'; L. Thy 90+3'	Stadium: Hindmarsh Stadium; Attendance: 3,762; Referee: Clifford Daypuyat (Philippines)

5 Nov 2026 MD4	Lion City Sailors (Singapore)	5-0	(Australia) Adelaide United	Jalan Besar, Singapore
18:00 UTC+8	Phaëton 8', 75'; Wright 17'; Nakamura 41'; Fandi 71'	Report		Stadium: Jalan Besar Stadium; Attendance: 1,847; Referee: Sanzhar Zhakypbekov (Kyrgyzstan)

26 Nov 2026 MD5	BG Pathum United (Thailand)	v	(Singapore) Lion City Sailors	Pathum Thani, Thailand
19:15 UTC+7				Stadium: True BG Stadium

3 Dec 2026 MD6	Lion City Sailors (Singapore)	v	(Hong Kong) Tai Po	Jalan Besar, Singapore
18:00 UTC+8				Stadium: Jalan Besar Stadium

===== Tampines Rovers =====
Group G

Pos	Team	Pld	W	D	L	GF	GA	GD	Pts	Qualification
1	(Japan) Machida Zelvia (A)	4	4	0	0	6	1	+5	12	Advance to round of 16
2	(Cambodia) PKR Svay Rieng	4	2	1	1	7	3	+4	7	Advance to round of 16
3	(China) Shanghai Shenhua	4	1	1	2	3	4	−1	4	
4	(Singapore) Tampines Rovers (E)	4	0	0	4	2	10	−8	0	

Updated to match(es) played on 5 November 2026. Source: ACL2
Rules for classification: Tiebreakers
(A) Advance to a further round; (E) Eliminated

17 Sep 2026 MD1	Shanghai Shenhua (China)	2-1	(Singapore) Tampines Rovers	Shanghai, China
18:00 UTC+8	Xu Haoyang 19'; Yang Shuai 62'	Report	F. Ramli 33'	Stadium: Shanghai Stadium; Attendance: 24,024; Referee: Mooud Bonyadifard (Iran)

15 Oct 2026 MD2	Tampines Rovers (Singapore)	0-1	(Japan) Machida Zelvia	Jalan Besar, Singapore
20:15 UTC+8		Report	Mochizuki 90+4'	Stadium: Jalan Besar Stadium; Attendance: 947; Referee: Hussain Al-Showaikh (Bahrain)

29 Oct 2026 MD3	Tampines Rovers (Singapore)	1–5	(Cambodia) PKR Svay Rieng	Jalan Besar, Singapore
18:00 UTC+8	R. Suhaimi 90'	Report	M. Júnior 9'; Alves 15', 24'; Peprah 42'; Ibeh 69'	Stadium: Jalan Besar Stadium; Attendance: 573; Referee: Yahya Al-Mulla (United Arab Emirates)

5 Nov 2026 MD4	PKR Svay Rieng (Cambodia)	2–0	(Singapore) Tampines Rovers	Phnom Penh, Cambodia
19:15 UTC+7	Alves 32'; Tartarotti 78'	Report		Stadium: Morodok Techo National Stadium; Attendance: 4,669; Referee: Sami Al-Ismail (Saudi Arabia)

26 Nov 2026 MD5	Tampines Rovers (Singapore)	v	(China) Shanghai Shenhua	Jalan Besar, Singapore
18:00 UTC+8				Stadium: Jalan Besar Stadium

3 Dec 2026 MD6	Machida Zelvia (Japan)	v	(Singapore) Tampines Rovers	Machida, Singapore
18:00 UTC+9				Stadium: Machida Stadium

=== AFC Women's Champions League ===
FC Jurong, formerly known as Albirex Jurong, made their debut in the AFC Women's Champions League when they faced off three other debutantes in the preliminary stage. They started their campaign with a disappointing 4-0 loss to Ayeyawady FC of Myanmar. They exited the competition by finishing third in their group after defeating No Limits FC of Lebanon.

==== Preliminary phase ====
===== FC Jurong =====
Pos	Team	Pld	W	D	L	GF	GA	GD	Pts	Qualification
1	(Myanmar) Ayeyawady (H)	3	3	0	0	13	0	+13	9	Advance to group stage
2	(Chinese Taipei) New Taipei City Hang Yuan	3	2	0	1	8	2	+6	6	
3	(Singapore) FC Jurong	3	1	0	2	3	7	−4	3	
4	(Lebanon) No Limits	3	0	0	3	1	16	−15	0	

Source: AFC
Rules for classification: Tiebreakers
(H) Hosts

17 Aug 2026 MD1	Ayeyawady (Myanmar)	4–0	(Singapore) FC Jurong	Yangon, Myanmar
16:00 UTC+6:30	Kasai 35'; Win Theingi Tun 55', 78'; Lin Myint Mo 59'	Report		Stadium: Thuwunna Stadium; Attendance: 2,068; Referee: Oh Hyeon-jeong (South Korea)

20 Aug 2026 MD2	FC Jurong (Singapore)	1–2	(Chinese Taipei) Hang Yuan	Yangon, Myanmar
19:00 UTC+6:30	Kitahara 53'	Report	Miyamoto 38' (pen.); He Jia-Shiuan 64'	Stadium: Thuwunna Stadium; Attendance: 57; Referee: Roziyabonu Yusupova (Uzbekistan)

23 Aug 2026 MD3	FC Jurong (Singapore)	2–1	(Lebanon) No Limits	Yangon, Myanmar
19:00 UTC+6:30	Takashima 15', 27'	Report	Al Moujarkash 88'	Stadium: Thuwunna Stadium; Attendance: 63; Referee: Pansa Chaisanit (Thailand)

== Regional competitions ==
=== ASEAN Club Championship ===
==== Group phase ====
===== Lion City Sailors =====
Pos	Team	Pld	W	D	L	GF	GA	GD	Pts	Qualification
1	(Malaysia) Johor Darul Ta'zim	1	1	0	0	6	0	+6	3	Advance to knockout stage
2	(Indonesia) Persib	1	1	0	0	3	1	+2	3	Advance to knockout stage
3	(Vietnam) Công An Hà Nội	1	1	0	0	1	0	+1	3	Advance to knockout stage
4	(Myanmar) Shan United	0	0	0	0	0	0	0	0	Advance to knockout stage
5	(Singapore) Lion City Sailors	1	0	0	1	0	1	−1	0	
6	(Thailand) Port	1	0	0	1	1	3	−2	0	
7	(Cambodia) PKR Svay Rieng	1	0	0	1	0	6	−6	0	

Updated to match(es) played on 8 October 2026. Source: ASEAN United
Rules for classification: Tiebreakers

8 October 2026	Lion City Sailors (Singapore)	0-1	(Vietnam) Cong An Hanoi	Jalan Besar, Singapore
19:30 UTC+8		Report	Léo Artur 45+2'	Stadium: Jalan Besar Stadium; Attendance: 1,897; Referee: Hiroki Kasahara (Japan)

10 December 2026	Lion City Sailors (Singapore)	v	(Indonesia) Persib	Jalan Besar, Singapore
19:30 UTC+8		Report		Stadium: Jalan Besar Stadium

17 December 2026	PKR Svay Rieng (Cambodia)	v	(Singapore) Lion City Sailors	Phnom Penh, Cambodia
19:00 UTC+7		Report		Stadium: Morodok Techo National Stadium

25 February 2027	Lion City Sailors (Singapore)	v	(Thailand) Port	Jalan Besar, Singapore
19:30 UTC+8		Report		Stadium: Jalan Besar Stadium

4 March 2027	Shan United (Myanmar)	v	(Singapore) Lion City Sailors	Thuwunna Stadium
18:00 UTC+6:30		Report		Attendance: Yangon, Myanmar

1 April 2027	Johor Darul Ta'zim (Malaysia)	v	(Singapore) Lion City Sailors	Johor, Malaysia
20:30 UTC+8		Report		Stadium: Sultan Ibrahim Stadium

===== BG Tampines Rovers =====
Pos	Team	Pld	W	D	L	GF	GA	GD	Pts	Qualification
1	(Singapore) Tampines Rovers	1	0	1	0	2	2	0	1	Advance to knockout stage
2	(Malaysia) Kuching City	1	0	1	0	2	2	0	1	Advance to knockout stage
3	(Vietnam) Công An Hồ Chí Minh City	1	0	1	0	1	1	0	1	Advance to knockout stage
4	(Thailand) Ratchaburi	1	0	1	0	1	1	0	1	Advance to knockout stage
5	(Thailand) Buriram United	1	0	1	0	0	0	0	1	
6	(Indonesia) Borneo	1	0	1	0	0	0	0	1	
7	(Philippines) Manila Digger	0	0	0	0	0	0	0	0	

Updated to match(es) played on 7 October 2026. Source: ASEAN United
Rules for classification: Tiebreakers

7 October 2026	Kuching City (Malaysia)	2-2	(Singapore) Tampines Rovers	Kuching, Malaysia
--:-- UTC+8	G. Peres 87', 90+3'	Report	Furusawa 13'; Kazama 88'	Stadium: Sarawak Stadium; Attendance: 5,536; Referee: Omar Al-Yaqoubi (Oman)

18 November 2026	Tampines Rovers (Singapore)	v	(Thailand) Ratchaburi	Jalan Besar, Singapore
--:-- UTC+8		Report		Stadium: Jalan Besar Stadium

9 December 2026	Tampines Rovers (Singapore)	v	(Vietnam) Ho Chi Minh Police	Bishan, Singapore
--:-- UTC+8		Report		Stadium: Bishan Stadium

24 February 2027	Tampines Rovers (Singapore)	v	(Philippines) Manila Digger	Bishan, Singapore
--:-- UTC+8		Report		Stadium: Bishan Stadium

3 March 2027	Borneo (Indonesia)	v	(Singapore) Tampines Rovers	East Kalimantan, Indonesia
--:-- UTC+8		Report		Stadium: Segiri Stadium

31 March 2027	Buriram United (Thailand)	v	(Singapore) Tampines Rovers	Buriram, Thailand
--:-- UTC+8		Report		Stadium: Chang Arena

== League competitions (Men's) ==
League Division	Promoted to league ▲	Relegated from league ▼
SFL Div One	Bishan Barx FC ▲; South Avenue SC ▲	Katong FC ▼; Yishun Mariners FC ▼
SFL Div Two	Gymkhana Gaulois FC ▲; Tanah Merah United ▲	Westwood El'Junior FC ▼; Tiong Bahru FC ▼

=== Singapore Premier League ===
Pos	Team	Pld	W	D	L	GF	GA	GD	Pts
1	Geylang International	6	4	2	0	12	2	+10	14
2	Lion City Sailors	5	4	1	0	20	3	+17	13
3	Tampines Rovers	5	4	1	0	13	3	+10	13
4	FC Jurong	6	2	1	3	11	9	+2	7
5	Balestier Khalsa	6	2	1	3	7	12	−5	7
6	Tanjong Pagar United	6	2	1	3	7	16	−9	7
7	Young Lions (Note: Young Lions are not eligible to represent Singapore in AFC club competitions.)	6	1	0	5	6	21	−15	3
8	Hougang United	6	0	1	5	4	14	−10	1

Updated to match(es) played on 1 November 2026. Source: Singapore Premier League
Rules for classification: 1) Points; 2) goal difference; 3) goals scored; 4) wins

=== Singapore Premier League 2 ===
Pos	Team	Pld	W	D	L	GF	GA	GD	Pts	Qualification or relegation
1	Geylang International II	6	5	0	1	19	2	+17	15	Champion
2	Balestier Khalsa II	6	4	1	1	10	7	+3	13	
3	Tampines Rovers II	5	4	0	1	18	5	+13	12	
4	Young Lions B	3	2	0	1	10	7	+3	6	
5	FC Jurong II	5	1	1	3	11	12	−1	4	
6	Hougang United II	5	1	1	3	5	13	−8	4	
7	Tanjong Pagar United II	6	1	1	4	8	24	−16	4	
8	Lion City Sailors II	6	1	0	5	7	18	−11	3	

First match(es) will be played: 6 November 2026. Source: Singapore Premier League 2
Rules for classification: 1) points; 2) goal difference; 3) number of goals scored; 4) number of wins

=== Singapore Football League One ===
Pos	Team	Pld	W	D	L	GF	GA	GD	Pts
1	Singapore Cricket Club	5	4	0	1	18	7	+11	12
2	Police SA	5	3	1	1	10	5	+5	10
3	Project Vaults Oxley SC	5	3	1	1	8	3	+5	10
4	Tengah FC	4	2	1	1	6	3	+3	7
5	South Avenue SC	4	1	1	2	8	12	−4	4
6	Jungfrau Punggol FC	3	1	0	2	3	4	−1	3
7	Bishan Barx FC	4	1	0	3	3	6	−3	3
8	Singapore Khalsa Association	4	0	0	4	4	20	−16	0

Updated to match(es) played on 1 November 2026. Source: Football Association of Singapore
Rules for classification: 1) points; 2) goal difference; 3) number of goals scored; 4) number of wins

=== Singapore Football League Two ===
Pos	Team	Pld	W	D	L	GF	GA	GD	Pts
1	Gymkhana Gaulois FC	4	4	0	0	28	3	+25	12
2	Frenz GDT Circuit FC	5	4	0	1	20	11	+9	12
3	Tanah Merah United	4	2	2	0	12	5	+7	8
4	Katong FC	4	2	1	1	5	5	0	7
5	GFA Victoria FC	4	2	0	2	5	12	−7	6
6	Warwick Knights FC	4	1	1	2	6	7	−1	4
7	Admiralty CSN	5	1	1	3	5	20	−15	4
8	Starlight Soccerites	5	1	0	4	8	12	−4	3
9	Kaki Bukit SC	4	1	0	3	5	13	−8	3
10	Yishun Mariners FC	3	0	1	2	4	10	−6	1

Updated to match(es) played on 1 November 2026. Source: Football Association of Singapore
Rules for classification: 1) points; 2) goal difference; 3) number of goals scored; 4) number of wins

=== Island Wide League ===
Tiong Bahru FC made a swift return to the Singapore Football League 2 (SFL2) beating Jurong City in the 2026 Island Wide League Final. Tiong Bahru was relegated from SFL2 in 2025. However, they have a good start to the 2026 season by finishing top of their group with 4 wins, 1 draw and 1 loss. They have also beaten Singapore Recreation Club, Westwood El’Junior en route to the Final.

Final

16 August 2026
17:30 UTC+8

Jurong City	0-3	Tiong Bahru
	Report	Fitri Mohamed 13'; Nashrul Amin 64', 68'

Jurong East Stadium, Singapore

Both teams will be promoted to 2027/28 SFL2 after qualifying for the Final.

== Cup competitions (Men's) ==
=== Singapore FA Cup ===
Bracket

Round of 16
September 5 – Jurong East
Tengah FC	3
Frenz GDT Circuit	1
September 5 – Jurong East
South Avenue	6
Kaki Bukit	3
September 6 – Choa Chu Kang
Project Vaults Oxley	5
Tanah Merah United	1
September 6 – Choa Chu Kang
Police SA	1
Warwick Knights	0
September 5 – Choa Chu Kang
Bishan Barx	1
Katong FC	0
September 5 – Choa Chu Kang
Jungfrau Punggol	2
Admiralty CSN	1
September 6 – Jurong East
Singapore Cricket Club	0
Gymkhana Gaulois	1
September 6 – Jurong East
Singapore Khalsa Assoc.	4
Bedok South Avenue	1

Quarterfinals
September 13 – Jurong East
Tengah FC	2
South Avenue	3
September 13 – Jurong East
Project Vaults Oxley	2
Police SA	4
September 13 – Bedok
Bishan Barx	4
Jungfrau Punggol	1
September 13 – Bedok
Gymkhana Gaulois	5
Singapore Khalsa Assoc.	0

Semifinals
October 4 – Jurong East
South Avenue	3
Police SA	4
October 4 – Jurong East
Bishan Barx	0
Gymkhana Gaulois	3

Final
TBC – Jurong East
Police SA
Gymkhana Gaulois
Third-place Playoff
TBC – Jurong East
South Avenue
Bishan Barx

Final

17 October 2026	Police SA	v	Gymkhana Gaulois	Jurong East Stadium
19:30 UTC+8

== League competitions (Women's) ==
=== Women's Premier League ===
The 2026 season would see a return of promotion and relegation between the Premier League (WPL) and National League (WNL). Albirex Niigata (S) was renamed as Albirex Jurong for the 2026 season. Lion City Sailors reclaimed the WPL title with a 20-0 win over Hougang United on 27 June, securing a return to the AFC Women's Champions League for the 2027/28 season. Hougang United and Tiong Bahru, who lost to Unity FC in the playoff, will be relegated to WNL for the 2027/28 season.

League table

Pos	Team	Pld	W	D	L	GF	GA	GD	Pts	Qualification or relegation
1	Lion City Sailors (C)	16	15	0	1	166	4	+162	45	Qualification for AFC Champions League
2	Albirex Jurong	16	15	0	1	140	6	+134	45	
3	Still Aerion	16	11	1	4	52	27	+25	34	
4	Geylang International	16	10	1	5	44	28	+16	31	
5	BG Tampines Rovers	16	7	1	8	30	58	−28	22	
6	Tanjong Pagar United	16	3	3	10	8	75	−67	12	
7	Balestier Khalsa	16	4	0	12	19	107	−88	12	
8	Tiong Bahru (R)	16	1	2	13	16	64	−48	5	Play-off with WNL runners-up
9	Hougang United (R)	16	1	2	13	9	115	−106	5	Relegation to National League

Source: Women's Premier League
Rules for classification: 1) points; 2) goal difference; 3) number of goals scored; 4) number of wins
(C) League champions; (R) Relegated

=== Women's National League ===
Apart from the return of promotion and relegation between Premier League and National League clubs, the 2026 season will also see the introduction of WPL B-teams to allow WPL clubs to field a developmental squad in the WNL. However, the 'B' teams participating in the WNL will not be eligible for portion to the WPL. Lion City Sailors and Still Aerion will be sending 'B' teams into the competition.

Lion City Sailors ‘B’ were officially crowned the League champions following the conclusion of the Top Tier stage at Choa Chu Kang Stadium on 14 June 2026. Their title had been confirmed after defeating Frenz GDT Circuit 6-0 on 6 June 2026. Frenz GDT Circuit will be promoted to the WPL next season, alongside with Unity FC who defeated Tiong Bahru in the promotion/relegation playoff.

League table

Pos	Team	Pld	W	D	L	GF	GA	GD	Pts	Remarks
1	Lion City Sailors 'B' (Note: WPL 'B' teams participating in the WNL will not be eligible for promotion to the WPL next season.) (C)	13	13	0	0	82	5	+77	39	Champions
2	Frenz GDT Circuit FC (P)	13	10	0	3	54	27	+27	30	Promotion to Premier League
3	Still Aerion 'B'	13	9	0	4	30	15	+15	27	
4	Unity FC (Note: Unity FC will be promoted after defeating Tiong Bahru in a penalty shootout on 5 July 2026.) (P, O)	13	6	1	6	24	19	+5	19	Play-off with WPL 8th place
5	Katong FC	13	4	3	6	13	38	−25	15	
6	Jungfrau Punggol FC	13	7	0	6	25	26	−1	21	Bottom Tier (Note: Teams in 6th to 10th position after first round form the Bottom Tier)
7	Mattar Sailors FC	13	4	1	8	19	22	−3	13	Bottom Tier
8	Kaki Bukit SC	13	4	0	9	26	54	−28	12	Bottom Tier
9	Eastern Thunder FC	13	3	1	9	19	28	−9	10	Bottom Tier
10	SFA Combined Girls	13	2	0	11	7	65	−58	6	Bottom Tier

Source: FAS
Rules for classification: 1) points; 2) goal difference; 3) number of goals scored; 4) number of wins
(C) Champions; (O) Play-off winners; (P) Promoted

== Managerial changes ==
Team	Outgoing manager	Manner of departure	Date of departure	Position in table	Incoming manager	Date of appointment
Hougang United Women's	(Singapore) Sivaraj Geevananthan	End of contract		Pre-season	(Singapore) Al-Ameen Maricar	
Singapore women's national team	(Morocco) Karim Bencherifa	End of contract	2 April 2026	-	(Japan) Mihoko Ishida	5 April 2026
FC Jurong	(Japan) Keiji Shigetomi	Redesignated	1 June 2026	Pre-season	(Singapore) Jaswinder Singh	2 June 2026
Tampines Rovers	(Singapore) William Phang	End of interim	1 July 2026	Pre-season	(Singapore) Nazri Nasir	2 July 2026
Tanjong Pagar United	(Singapore) Noh Alam Shah	Mutual agreement	17 July 2026	Pre-season	(Spain) Miquel Lladó	11 August 2026
Lion City Sailors	(Spain) Jesús Casas	Sacked	1 September 2026	Pre-season	(Spain) Varo Moreno (interim)	1 September 2026
Lion City Sailors	(Spain) Varo Moreno	End of interim	12 September 2026 (Note: Varo Moreno remaining in interim charge of the First Team until Mark Jackson received employment visa approval.)	Pre-season	(England) Mark Jackson	9 September 2026

== Deaths ==
- 28 April 2026: Arasu s/o Muthu Suppiah (66), Singaporean head coach (Singapore national youth team) and AFC coaching instructor
- 9 September 2026: (England) Barry Whitbread (77), English head coach (Singapore, Runcorn F.C. Halton), head of recruitment (Liverpool's Youth Academy) and chief scout (Blackburn Rovers).
