= Machida =

Machida may refer to

- Machida (surname)
- Machida, Tokyo, a city in Japan
- Machida High School, high school in Machida
- Machida Station (disambiguation), multiple train stations in Japan
- FC Machida Zelvia, football club in Machida, Tokyo
