= 2026 Women's Premier League =

2026 Women's Premier League may refer to:

- 2026 Women's Premier League (cricket), the Indian cricket league.
- 2026 Women's Premier League (Singapore), the Singaporean football league.
