= 2026 Aerion Women's FC season =

Still Aerion WFC
2026 season
- Chairman: Simon Tan
- Head Coach: Jeremy Chiang
- Premier League: 3rd
- National League: 3rd
- Top goalscorer: League: Anna Seng (15 goals); All: Anna Seng (21 goals)

The 2026 season will mark Still Aerion Women's Football Club's 17th season playing in the top flight of Singapore's women football, Women's Premier League.

In view of the structural and regulatory adjustments introduced by Football Association of Singapore, Still Aerion will be sending a 'B' team for the Women's National League. Royal Arion will not be participating in the 2026 WNL.

== Squad ==
=== Still Aerion WFC ===
Squad No.	Name	Nationality	Date of birth (age)	Previous club	Contract since	Contract end
Goalkeeper
1	Hazel Lim Ya Ting	(Singapore)	3 March 2002 (age 24)	(Singapore) Lion City Sailors	2026	2026
22	Lutfiah Hannah	(Singapore)	6 February 2001 (age 25)	(Singapore) Albirex Niigata (S)	2025	2026
Defender
3	Angelyn Pang Yen Ping	(Singapore)	13 April 1991 (age 35)	(Singapore) Hougang United	2026	2026
6	Fonda Chai (C)	(Singapore)	9 December 1993 (age 32)	(Singapore)	2017	2026
11	Sunisa Srangthaisong	(Thailand)	6 May 1988 (age 38)	(Singapore) Royal Arion	2024	2026
14	Calista Li Ya Dodson	(Singapore)	20 November 2009 (age 16)	(Singapore) NDC (Note: NDC refers to National Development Centre in Singapore)	2026	2026
15	Bernice Lim	(Singapore)	9 July 2009 (age 17)	(Singapore)	2026	2026
45	Dini Dannisha	(Singapore)	6 April 2003 (age 23)	(Singapore) Albirex Niigata (S)	2025	2026
Midfielder
4	Janet Tan	(Singapore)	6 November 2007 (age 18)	(Singapore) Albirex Niigata (S)	2025	2026
5	Bhanu Krishnasamy	(Singapore)	28 August 1995 (age 31)	(Singapore) Royal Arion	2024	2026
8	Noralinda Wahab	(Singapore)	8 March 1994 (age 32)	(Singapore)	2025	2026
12	Nurul Unaisah	(Singapore)	12 July 2003 (age 23)	(Singapore) Albirex Niigata (S)	2025	2026
17	Mikayla Simons	(United States) (Philippines)	18 November 2000 (age 25)	(Philippines) Stallion Laguna	2026	2026
19	Ayla Chin	(Singapore)	19 August 2010 (age 16)	(Singapore) Royal Arion/NDC	2025	2026
23	Nur Afiqah bte Omar	(Singapore)	15 October 2001 (age 24)	(Singapore) Albirex Niigata (S)	2025	2026
25	Rachel Chan Ye Ling	(Singapore)	25 August 2004 (age 22)	(Singapore) Hougang United	2026	2026
Forwards
9	Andrea Moska	(Mexico)	27 August 1990 (age 36)	(Singapore) BG Tampines Rovers	2025	2026
10	Nicole Lim Yan Xiu	(Singapore)	10 April 2002 (age 24)	(Singapore) Lion City Sailors	2026	2026
18	Anna Seng	(Singapore)	24 April 2009 (age 17)	(Singapore) BG Tampines Rovers	2026	2026
21	Zoey Chua	(Singapore)	26 March 2006 (age 20)	(Singapore) Hougang United	2026	2026
27	Riddle Reneelyn Sison	(Singapore) (Philippines)	21 September 2000 (age 26)	(Singapore) Hougang United	2026	2026
28	Isabella Rose Edwards	(Australia)	26 June 2010 (age 16)	(Singapore) BG Tampines Rovers	2026	2026
Players who left during the season
7	Pikul Khueanpet	(Thailand)	20 September 1988 (age 38)	(Thailand) BG Bundit Asia	2026	2026

Source: @stillaerionwfc/IG

=== Still Aerion 'B' ===
Note: Still Aerion did not released the 2026 player roster of the 'B' team.

Squad No.	Name	Nationality	Date of birth (age)	Previous club	Contract since	Contract end
Goalkeeper
58	Pamela Kong Zi En	(Singapore)	5 August 1991 (age 35)	(Singapore)	2022	2026
Defender
64	Jasmine Kua (C)	(Singapore)	24 November 1999 (age 26)	(Singapore) Hougang United	2023	2026
73	Alesha Dania Puteri	(Singapore)	13 August 2009 (age 17)	(Singapore)		2026
Midfielder
60	Putri Alyssa Riana	(Singapore)	26 November 2011 (age 14)	(Singapore) Ayer Rajah Gryphons	2024	2026
88	Danelynn Ding	(Singapore)	8 July 1999 (age 27)	(Singapore)		2026
90	Yang Shuting	(Singapore)	23 June 2009 (age 17)	(Singapore)		2026
92	Natasha Kaur	(Singapore)	15 June 2009 (age 17)	(Singapore) Albirex Jurong	2026	2026
96	Zhang Keqing	(Singapore)	24 August 2007 (age 19)	(Singapore)		2026
Forward
52	Ashley Tan	(Singapore)	6 September 2009 (age 17)	(Singapore)		2026
71	Putri Noor Lyshanty	(Singapore)	29 July 2010 (age 16)	(Singapore)		2026
91	Hannah Tasha Abdullahsiraj	(Singapore)	22 October 2008 (age 17)	(Singapore)	2026	2026
Outfield Players
77	Nadirah	(Singapore)		(Singapore)		2026
86	Siti	(Singapore)		(Singapore)		2026
89	Adriana	(Singapore)		(Singapore)		2026
98	Linnèa	(Singapore)		(Singapore)		2026
99	Libby	(Singapore)		(Singapore)		2026
	Nadia	(Singapore)		(Singapore)		2026
	Miska	(Singapore)		(Singapore)	2025	2026

Source: @stillaerionwfc/IG

== Coaching staff ==
The following list displays the coaching staff of all the Aerion Women's FC current football sections:

Position	Name
President	Simon Tan
General Manager	
Team Manager (Still Aerion)	
Head Coach (Still Aerion)	(Singapore) Jeremy Chiang
Technical Director	
Coach	(Singapore) Hazwan Shaik
Goalkeeper Coach	(Singapore) Leon Lee
Team Manager ('B' team)	
Head Coach ('B' team)	

== Transfers ==
=== In ===
Pre-season

Position	Player	Transferred From
GF	(Singapore) Hazel Lim Ya Ting	(Singapore) Lion City Sailors
DF	(Singapore) Angelyn Pang Yen Ping	(Singapore) Hougang United
MF	(Thailand) Pikul Khueanpet	(Thailand) BG Bundit Asia
DF	(Singapore) Calista Dodson	(Singapore) National Development Centre
DF	(Singapore) Bernice Lim	(Singapore)
MF	(United States) Mikayla Simons	(Philippines) Stallion Laguna
DF	(Singapore) Rachel Chan Ye Ling	(Singapore) Hougang United
FW	(Singapore) Nicole Lim Yan Xiu	(Singapore) Lion City Sailors
FW	(Singapore) Anna Seng	(Singapore) BG Tampines Rovers
FW	(Singapore) Joey Chua	(Singapore) Hougang United
FW	(Singapore) Riddle Reneelyn Sison	(Singapore) Hougang United
FW	(Australia) Isabella Rose Edwards	(Singapore) BG Tampines Rovers

Mid-season

Position	Player	Transferred From
FW	(Singapore) Hannah Tasha	(Singapore) Mattar Sailors
MF	(Singapore) Natasha Kaur	(Singapore) Albirex Jurong

=== Out ===
Preseason

Position	Player	Transferred To
FW	(Cambodia) Yon Yoeurn	(Cambodia) Nagaworld FC (loan ended)
DF	(Singapore) Miska	(Singapore)
MF	(Singapore) Ella	(Singapore)
MF	(Singapore) Huraizah Ismail	(Singapore)
FW	(Singapore) Lila Tan Hui Ying	(Singapore)
FW	(Thailand) Thanaporn Yimlamai	
FW	(Thailand) Jaruwan Chaiyarak	
FW	(Singapore) Nur Azureen Abdul Rahman	(Singapore)
FW	(Brazil) Luana Carneiro	Left the club

Mid-season

Position	Player	Transferred To
FW	(Thailand) Pikul Khueanpet	(Thailand) BGC Bundit Asia (loan ended)

== Team statistics ==
=== Appearances and goals ===
==== Still Aerion WFC ====
As of 28 Jun 2026

No.	Pos.	Player	WPL		Total	
No.	Pos.	Player	Apps.	Goals	Apps.	Goals
1	GK	(Singapore) Hazel Lim Ya Ting	11+0	0	11+0	0
3	DF	(Singapore) Angelyn Pang Yen Ping	15+1	2	15+1	2
4	MF	(Singapore) Janet Tan	6+1	0	6+1	0
5	MF	(Singapore) Bhanu Krishnasamy	12+2	1	12+2	1
6	DF	(Singapore) Fonda Chai (C )	15+0	0	15+0	0
7	MF	(Thailand) Pikul Khueanpet	7+0	3	7+0	3
8	MF	(Singapore) Noralinda Wahab	0+0	0	0+0	0
9	FW	(Mexico) Andrea Moska	0+4	2	0+4	2
10	FW	(Singapore) Nicole Lim Yan Xiu	11+0	4	11+0	4
11	DF	(Thailand) Sunisa Srangthaisong	15+1	7	15+1	7
12	MF	(Singapore) Nurul Unaisah	1+0	0	1+0	0
14	DF	(Singapore) Calista Dodson	5+6	1	5+6	1
15	DF	(Singapore) Bernice Lim	0+5	1	0+5	1
17	MF	(United States) Mikayla Simons	7+0	0	7+0	0
18	FW	(Singapore) Anna Seng	15+1	15	15+1	15
19	MF	(Singapore) Ayla Chin	11+3	0	11+3	0
21	FW	(Singapore) Zoey Chua	4+4	2	4+4	2
22	GK	(Singapore) Lutfiah Hannah	5+0	0	5+0	0
23	MF	(Singapore) Nur Afiqah bte Omar	7+2	1	7+2	1
25	MF	(Singapore) Rachel Chan Ye Ling	4+6	0	4+6	0
27	FW	(Singapore) Riddle Reneelyn Sison	9+2	2	9+2	2
28	FW	(Australia) Isabella Rose Edwards	12+2	8	12+2	8
45	DF	(Singapore) Dini Dannisha	1+0	0	1+0	0
52	FW	(Singapore) Ashley Tan (Note: Registered under 'B' team)	0+2	0	0+2	0
60	MF	(Singapore) Putri Alyssa Rianna	0+2	0	0+2	0
64	DF	(Singapore) Jasmine Kua	0+3	0	0+3	0
71	FW	(Singapore) Putri Noor Lyshanty	1+2	0	1+2	0
73	DF	(Singapore) Alesha Dania Puteri	1+0	0	1+0	0
88	MF	(Singapore) Danelynn Ding	1+1	1	1+1	1
91	FW	(Singapore) Hannah Tasha	0+1	0	0+1	0
92	MF	(Singapore) Natasha Kaur	0+1	0	0+1	0
96	MF	(Singapore) Zhang Keqing	0+1	0	0+1	0

Note: Substitutions made (if any) in the last 4 matches were not recorded

=== Leading Scorers ===
==== Still Aerion WFC ====
As of 24 June 2026

Rank	Player	Goals
1	(Singapore) Anna Seng	15
2	(Australia) Isabella Rose Edwards	8
3	(Thailand) Sunisa Srangthaisong	6
4	(Thailand) Pikul Khueanpet	3
5	(Mexico) Andrea Moska	2
5	(Singapore) Nicole Lim	2
5	(Singapore) Angelyn Pang	2
5	(Singapore) Zoey Chua	2
5	(Singapore) Reneelyn Sison	2
6	(Singapore) Bernice Lim	1
6	(Singapore) Nur Afiqah Omar	1
6	(Singapore) Danelynn Ding (Note: Players registered under 'B' team)	1
6	(Singapore) Calista Dodson	1
6	(Singapore) Bhanu Krishnasamy	1

==== Still Aerion 'B' ====
As of 14 Jun 2026

Rank	Player	Goals
1	(Australia) Isabella Rose Edwards (Note: Players registered under 'A' team)	6
1	(Singapore) Anna Seng	6
2	(Singapore) Ashley	5
3	(Singapore) Zoey Chua	3
4	(Singapore) Nur Afiqah Omar	2
5	(Singapore) Linnèa	1
5	(United States) Mikayla Simons	1
5	(Singapore) Putri Alyssa Riana	1
5	(Singapore) Putri Noor Lyshanty	1
5	(Singapore) Angelyn Pang	1
5	(Singapore) Libby	1
5	(Singapore) Nicole Lim	1
5	(Singapore) Sunisa Srangthaisong	1

== Competition ==
=== Women's Premier League ===
==== Still Aerion WFC ====
Fixtures and results

Win Draw Loss Postponed

25 January 2026 1	Still Aerion	3-1	Geylang International	Bukit Gombak Stadium
17:00 UTC+8	Anna Seng 24'; Bernice Lim 78'; Pikul Khueanpet 80'	Report	Saranya Thiru 1'	Player of the Match: Sunisa S.

31 January 2026 2	Lion City Sailors	1-0	Still Aerion	Choa Chu Kang Stadium
19:30 UTC+8	Angelyn Pang 81' (o.g.)	Report

7 February 2026 3	Still Aerion	2-6	Albirex Jurong	Choa Chu Kang Stadium
17:00 UTC+8	Sunisa S. 34' (pen.); Angelyn Pang 68'	Report	Ruriko Takashima 10', 22', 40', 62', 90+1'; Kana Kitahara 53'

20 February 2026 4	Still Aerion	7-0	Hougang United	Jurong East Stadium
19:45 UTC+8	Anna Seng 16', 30', 48', 62'; Zoey Chua 42'; Isabella Edwards 45+2', 58'	Report		Player of the Match: Anna

10 March 2026 5	Balestier Khalsa	0-5	Still Aerion	Jurong East Stadium
19:45 UTC+8		Report	Reneelyn Sison 18'; Nicole Lim 53'; Isabella Edwards 71'; Sunisa S. 74'; Andrea Moska 90+2'

27 March 2026 6	Still Aerion	5-0	Tanjong Pagar United	Choa Chu Kang Stadium
19:45 UTC+8	Sunisa S. 8', 21'; Afiqah 19'; Anna Seng 50'; Andrea Moska 90+1'	Report

5 April 2026 7	BG Tampines Rovers	1-6	Still Aerion	Choa Chu Kang Stadium
19:30 UTC+8	Nahwah Aidilreza 59'	Report	Isabella Edwards 2'; Pikul K. 5', 15'; Anna Seng 58'; Sunisa S. 84'; Nicole Lim 89'	Player of the Match: Sunisa S.

25 April 2026 8	Still Aerion	0-9	Lion City Sailors	Choa Chu Kang Stadium
19:30 UTC+8		Report	Ami Takeuchi 21', 42', 53'; Ain Salleh 26'; Eri Kitagawa 30'; Ami Kawase 37', 71'; Syazwani Ruzi 50'; Venetia Lim 62'

2 May 2026 9	Albirex Jurong	6-0	Still Aerion	Bukit Gombak Stadium
17:00 UTC+8	Kana Kitahara 4'; 15' (o.g.); Nani 45+3'; Ruriko Takashima 54', 76'; Manami Fukuzawa 80'

9 May 2026 10	Still Aerion	2-0	Tiong Bahru	Choa Chu Kang Stadium
19:30 UTC+8		Report	Anna Seng 9'; Wee Xin Yi 30' (o.g.)	Player of the Match: B. Krishnasamy

16 May 2026 11	Hougang United	2-6	Still Aerion	Choa Chu Kang Stadium
17:00 UTC+8	Venya Jain 50'; Nuurfathimah Syaakirah 90+3'	Report	Danelynn 45+2'; Anna Seng 57', 86'; Calista 70'; Isabella Edwards 75'; Natasha Tan 87' (o.g.)	Player of the Match: Anna Seng

22 May 2026 12	Still Aerion	8-1	Balestier Khalsa	Choa Chu Kang Stadium
19:45 UTC+8	Anna Seng 2', 83' (pen.); Angelyn Pang 10'; Zoey Chua 22'; Sunisa S. 38'; Isabella Edwards 59', 70', 87'			Player of the Match: Isabella E.

10 June 2026 13	Tiong Bahru	0-2	Still Aerion	Choa Chu Kang Stadium
19:45 UTC+8			Anna Seng 36', 48'	Player of the Match: Anna Seng

20 June 2026 14	Tanjong Pagar	0-3	Still Aerion	Choa Chu Kang Stadium
19:30 UTC+8		Report	Bhanu 36'; Reneelyn 78'; Anna Seng 89'	Player of the Match: Sunisa S.

24 June 2026 15	Geylang International	0-0	Still Aerion	Choa Chu Kang Stadium
19:45 UTC+8				Player of the Match: Isabella Edwards

28 June 2026 16	Still Aerion	3-0	BG Tampines Rovers	Choa Chu Kang Stadium
17:00 UTC+8	Nicole Lim 27', 78' (pen.); Sunisa S. 52'	Report		Player of the Match: Nicole Lim

League table

Pos	Team	Pld	W	D	L	GF	GA	GD	Pts	Qualification or relegation
1	Lion City Sailors (C)	16	15	0	1	166	4	+162	45	Qualification for AFC Champions League
2	Albirex Jurong	16	15	0	1	140	6	+134	45	
3	Still Aerion	16	11	1	4	52	27	+25	34	
4	Geylang International	16	10	1	5	44	28	+16	31	
5	BG Tampines Rovers	16	7	1	8	30	58	−28	22	
6	Tanjong Pagar United	16	3	3	10	8	75	−67	12	
7	Balestier Khalsa	16	4	0	12	19	107	−88	12	
8	Tiong Bahru (R)	16	1	2	13	16	64	−48	5	Play-off with WNL runners-up
9	Hougang United (R)	16	1	2	13	9	115	−106	5	Relegation to National League

Source: Women's Premier League
Rules for classification: 1) points; 2) goal difference; 3) number of goals scored; 4) number of wins
(C) League champions; (R) Relegated

=== Women's National League ===
==== Still Aerion 'B' ====
Fixtures and results

Win Draw Loss Postponed

First Round

8 Feb 2026 5	Still Aerion 'B'	2-1	SFA Combined Girls	Choa Chu Kang
19:30 UTC+8	Isabella Rose Edwards 48'; Anna Seng 50'	Report	Goal	Stadium: Choa Chu Kang Stadium; Player of the Match: J. Kua

15 Feb 2026 10	Still Aerion 'B'	6-1	Kaki Bukit	Bukit Gombak
17:00 UTC+8	Nur Afiqah Omar 14', 56'; Linnèa 17'; Zoey Chua 25'; Anna Seng 48', 79'	Report	Goal	Stadium: Bukit Gombak Stadium; Player of the Match: Anna

28 Feb 2026 14	Frenz GDT Circuit	1-0	Still Aerion 'B'	SRC Ayer Rajah Field
20:00 UTC+8	Atiqah Hazirah	Report

15 Mar 2026 20	Still Aerion 'B'	3-1	Katong FC	Choa Chu Kang
19:45 UTC+8	Isabella Rose Edwards 58'; Zoey Chua 77'; Ashley 78'	Report		Stadium: Choa Chu Kang Stadium; Player of the Match: Isabella

29 Mar 2026 25	Eastern Thunder	0-2	Still Aerion 'B'	Choa Chu Kang
19:30 UTC+8		Report	Mikayla 78'; Isabella 83'	Stadium: Choa Chu Kang Stadium; Player of the Match: Isabella

11 Apr 2026 26	Still Aerion 'B'	2-1	Unity FC	XCL World Academy
15:00 UTC+8	Ashley 39'; Angelyn Pang 82'	Report

18 Apr 2026 31	Still Aerion 'B'	0-3	Lion City Sailors 'B'	Choa Chu Kang
15:00 UTC+8		Report		Stadium: Choa Chu Kang Stadium

26 Apr 2026 39	Mattar Sailors	0-2	Still Aerion 'B'	East Spring Secondary
15:00 UTC+8		Report	Nicole 15'; Putri (#71) 58'	Player of the Match: Hazel Lim

3 May 2026 43	Still Aerion 'B'	6-0	Jungfrau Punggol	Bukit Gombak
17:00 UTC+8	Zoey Chua 16'; Ashley 37'; Anna Seng 41'; Isabella Edwards 45+1', 66'; Alyssa 52'			Stadium: Bukit Gombak Stadium; Player of the Match: Fonda Chai

Second Round

10 May 2026 47	Still Aerion 'B'	0-3	Lion City Sailors 'B'	Choa Chu Kang
17:00 UTC+8				Stadium: Choa Chu Kang Stadium

17 May 2026 49	Katong FC	0-3	Still Aerion 'B'	SRC Ayer Rajah Field
17:00 UTC+8		Report	Libby 20'; Anna Seng 63'; Isabella Edwards 88'	Player of the Match: Isabella Edwards

23 May 2026 52	Unity FC	3-0	Still Aerion 'B'	XCL World Academy
15:00 UTC+8

14 Jun 2026 60	Still Aerion 'B'	4-1	Frenz GDT Circuit	Bukit Gombak Stadium
19:30 UTC+8	Anna Seng 2'; Ashley Tan 14', 33'; Sunisa S. 21'		Nur Hannah	Player of the Match: Ashley Tan

League table

Pos	Team	Pld	W	D	L	GF	GA	GD	Pts	Remarks
1	Lion City Sailors 'B' (Note: WPL 'B' teams participating in the WNL will not be eligible for promotion to the WPL next season.) (C)	13	13	0	0	82	5	+77	39	Champions
2	Frenz GDT Circuit FC (P)	13	10	0	3	54	27	+27	30	Promotion to Premier League
3	Still Aerion 'B'	13	9	0	4	30	15	+15	27	
4	Unity FC (Note: Unity FC will be promoted after defeating Tiong Bahru in a penalty shootout on 5 July 2026.) (P, O)	13	6	1	6	24	19	+5	19	Play-off with WPL 8th place
5	Katong FC	13	4	3	6	13	38	−25	15	
6	Jungfrau Punggol FC	13	7	0	6	25	26	−1	21	Bottom Tier (Note: Teams in 6th to 10th position after first round form the Bottom Tier)
7	Mattar Sailors FC	13	4	1	8	19	22	−3	13	Bottom Tier
8	Kaki Bukit SC	13	4	0	9	26	54	−28	12	Bottom Tier
9	Eastern Thunder FC	13	3	1	9	19	28	−9	10	Bottom Tier
10	SFA Combined Girls	13	2	0	11	7	65	−58	6	Bottom Tier

Source: FAS
Rules for classification: 1) points; 2) goal difference; 3) number of goals scored; 4) number of wins
(C) Champions; (O) Play-off winners; (P) Promoted
