= Machida (surname) =

Machida (written: 町田 lit. "town ricefield", or 待田) is a Japanese surname. Notable people with the surname include:

- Akira Machida (町田 顯; 1936–2015), Japanese judge
- Machida Chūji (町田 忠治; 1863–1946), Japanese politician
- Emi Machida (町田 恵美; born 1975), Japanese toji or master sake brewer
- Fumihiko Machida (町田 文彦; born 1969), Japanese badminton player
- Machida Hisanari (町田 久成; 1838–1897), Japanese samurai and statesman
- Machida Kashō (町田 嘉章; 1888–1981), Japanese ethnomusicologist and shamisen player
- Keita Machida (町田 啓太; born 1990), Japanese actor
- Kō Machida (町田 康; born 1962), Japanese author, singer, actor
- Kōki Machida (町田 浩樹; born 1997), Japanese footballer
- Kyosuke Machida (待田 京介; born 1936), Japanese actor
- Lyoto Machida (町田 龍太; born 1978), Japanese-Brazilian mixed martial artist
- Margo Machida (玛尔戈·町田; born 1950), American art historian and curator
- Norihiko Machida (町田 紀彦; born 1976), Japanese music producer, lyricist, composer
- Rui Machida (町田 瑠唯; born 1993), Japanese basketball player
- Sonoko Machida (町田 そのこ; born 1980), Japanese novelist
- Sush Machida Gaikotsu (born 1973), Japanese-born artist
- Tadamichi Machida (町田 忠道; born 1981), Japanese footballer
- Tatsuki Machida (町田 樹; born 1990), Japanese figure skater
- Touko Machida (待田 堂子), Japanese screenwriter
- Yamato Machida (町田 也真人; born 1989), Japanese footballer
- Yoshio Machida (町田 良夫; born 1967), Japanese musician and artist
