= 2026 Albirex Jurong Women season =

Albirex Jurong
2026 season
- Chairman: Daisuke Korenaga
- Head coach: (Japan) Kana Kitahara
- Premier League: 2nd of 9
- Top goalscorer: Ruriko Takashima (43 goals)

The 2026 season is Albirex Jurong Women, 5th consecutive season in the top flight of Singapore football and its first after it was renamed from Albirex Niigata (S) on 1 January 2026.

The 2026 Albirex Jurong Women's team will be playing in the Women's Premier League (Singapore) & 2026–27 AFC Women's Champions League after winning the 2025 league.

== Squad ==
=== Women squad ===
As of 5 February 2022

Squad No.	Name	Nationality	Date of birth (age)	Previous club	Contract start	Contract end
Goalkeepers
1	Talia Sachet	(Singapore) (France)	10 July 2009 (age 17)	(Singapore) Balestier Khalsa	2026	2026
17	Ng Meizhi	(Singapore)	10 September 1994 (age 31)	(China) SWIFC	2025	2026
23	Erlinawaty Jaffar	(Singapore)	10 November 1985 (age 40)	(Singapore) Hougang United	2025	2026
Defenders
2	Manami Uchida	(Japan)	3 January 2004 (age 22)	(Japan) Kibi International University	2026	2026
3	Ananya Pande	(India) (Hong Kong)	14 April 2010 (age 16)	(Singapore) BG Tampines Rovers	2026	2026
4	Sun Jie	(Singapore) (China)	31 July 1985 (age 41)	(Singapore)	2023	2026
5	Riho Katayama	(Japan)	28 August 2008 (age 17)	(Japan) Sanda Shounkan Senior High School	2026	2026
6	Nur Darwisyah	(Singapore)	22 July 2001 (age 25)	(Singapore) JSSL Tampines	2024	2026
16	Natasha Kaur	(Singapore)	15 June 2009 (age 17)	(Singapore) Geylang International	2026	2026
20	Sara Merican	(Singapore)	19 April 1996 (age 30)	(England) Salford City	2026	2026
22	Cocolo Kaneko	(Singapore) (Japan)	30 August 2009 (age 16)	(Singapore) JSSL FC	2026	2026
24	Monessha Nair	(Singapore)	4 June 1995 (age 31)	(Singapore) Still Aerion	2025	2026
25	Reina Ikeda	(Japan)	24 May 1997 (age 29)	(Japan) Viamaterras Miyazaki	2026	2026
27	Izyani Ghani	(Singapore)	22 October 1987 (age 38)	(Singapore) Hougang United	2025	2026
30	Chiyoko Okada	(Singapore) (Japan)	29 October 2011 (age 14)	(Singapore) Albriex SG FA	2026	2026
50	Rosnani Azman	(Singapore)	22 May 1997 (age 29)	(Singapore) Hougang United	2024	2026
Midfielders
7	Emily Baranyay	(South Africa) (Hungary) (England)	30 January 2009 (age 17)	Singapore Football Club	2026	2026
8	Sitianiwati Rosielin	(Singapore)	26 May 1987 (age 39)	(Singapore) Hougang United	2025	2026
11	Anaya Sehgal	(India) (Hong Kong)	7 December 2008 (age 17)	(Singapore) Lion City Sailors	2026	2026
13	Joie Teo	(Singapore)	30 January 2001 (age 25)	(Singapore) Tanjong Pagar United	2026	2026
14	Kana Kitahara	(Japan)	7 December 1988 (age 37)	(Japan) MyNavi Sendai	2022	2026
15	Siti Wan Nabilah	(Singapore)	15 May 1993 (age 33)	(Singapore) Hougang United	2025	2026
19	Ayaka Miki	(Japan)	19 August 1992 (age 33)	(Singapore) Tanjong Pagar United	2026	2026
21	Tara McCoy	(England) (Singapore)	11 May 2010 (age 16)	(Singapore) Mattar Sailors	2026	2026
Strikers
9	Manami Fukuzawa	(Japan)	2 May 1991 (age 35)	(Singapore) Tanjong Pagar United	2024	2026
18	Ruriko Takashima	(Japan)	8 May 1990 (age 36)	(Japan) Asahi Intecc Loveledge Nagoya	2025	2026
Players who left club during season

== Coaching staff ==
First team

Position	Name
Team manager (men)	(Singapore) Dominic Wong
Head coach (men)	(Japan) Keiji Shigetomi
Head coach (women)	(Japan) Kana Kitahara
Head coach (SPL2); Assistant coach (men)	(Singapore) Jaswinder Singh
Assistant coach (women)	(Japan) Yuki Monden (Singapore) Nas Nastain
Goalkeeper coach (men)	(Singapore) Fadhil Salim
Goalkeeper coach (women)	(Singapore) Bryan Quek
Fitness coach (men)	(Singapore) Mark
Sports trainer	(Singapore) Kyler Wong Yiming (Singapore) Hafiz
Physiotherapist	(Singapore) Karen Koh (Singapore) Alison Soh
Analyst	(Singapore) Shaun Tan
Kitman	(Singapore) Roy Krishnan (Singapore) Muhammad Taufik
Interpreter	(Japan) Masayuki Kato

Academy

Position	Name
Head of youth	(Spain) Marcal Trulls
Under-21 head coach	(Singapore) Jaswinder Singh
Under-17 head coach	(Spain) Marcal Trulls
Under-15 head coach	(Japan) Masayuki Kato
Under-13 head coach	(Singapore) Nas Nastain
Under-21 asst coach	(Singapore) Abdul Jamal (Singapore) Toi
Under-17 asst coach	(Japan) Keiji Shigetomi
Under-15 asst coach	(Singapore) Sazali Salleh
Under-13 asst coach	(Singapore) Juma'at Jantan
Goalkeeper coach (under-21)	(Singapore) Wan Shaifulrezza Bin Shes
Goalkeeper coach (under-17)	(Singapore) Hyrulnizam Juma'at
Goalkeeper coach (under-15)	(Singapore) Fadhilah Hassan
Under-21 fitness coach	(Singapore) Sufian
Under-21 trainer	(Singapore) Xin Yu

== Transfer ==
=== In ===
Preseason

Date	Position	Player	Transferred from	Ref
21 January 2026	GK	(Singapore) (France) Talia Sachet	(Singapore) Balestier Khalsa	
21 January 2026	DF	(India) (Hong Kong) Ananya Pande	(Singapore) BG Tampines Rovers	
21 January 2026	MF	(South Africa) (Hungary) (England) Emily Baranyay	Singapore Football Club	
22 January 2026	DF	(Singapore) (Japan) Chiyoko Okada	(Singapore) Albirex Girls Football Academy	
22 January 2026	MF	(Singapore) Joie Teo	(Singapore) Tanjong Pagar United	
22 January 2026	MF	(India) (Hong Kong) Anaya Sehgal	(Singapore) Lion City Sailors	
23 January 2026	DF	(Singapore) (Japan) Cocolo Kaneko	(Singapore) JSSL FC	
23 January 2026	DF	(Japan) Riho Katayama	(Japan) Sanda Shounkan Senior High School	
23 January 2026	DF	(Singapore) Natasha Kaur	(Singapore) Geylang International	
23 January 2026	MF	(Japan) Ayaka Miki	(Singapore) Tanjong Pagar United	

=== Out ===
Preseason

Date	Position	Player	Transferred To	Ref
31 December 2025	GK	(Singapore) Aaliya Rosman	(Singapore)	
31 December 2025	DF	(Singapore) El'rina Alisha	(Singapore)	
31 December 2025	DF	(Singapore) Munirah Mohamad	(Singapore)	
31 December 2025	MF	(Singapore) Ariqah Erwan	(Singapore)	
31 December 2025	MF	(Singapore) Nurzaherra Maisarah	(Singapore) Tiong Bahru	
31 December 2025	MF	(Singapore) Alwydia Putri	(Singapore)	
31 December 2025	MF	(Singapore) Verona Lim Ruo Ya	(United States) IMG Academy	
31 December 2025	MF	(Singapore) Asyura Abdullah	(Singapore)	
31 December 2025	MF	(China) Vanessa Han	(Singapore)	

=== Extended ===
Date	Position	Player	Ref
23 December 2025	MF	(Japan) Kana Kitahara	
23 December 2025	FW	(Japan) Ruriko Takashima	
24 December 2025	FW	(Japan) Manami Fukuzawaa	
27 December 2025	DF	(Singapore) (China) Sun Jie	
28 December 2025	GK	(Singapore) Erlinawaty Dewi Jaffar	
28 December 2025	DF	(Singapore) Sitianiwati Rosielin	
28 December 2025	DF	(Singapore) Siti Wan Nabilah	
29 December 2025	MF	(Singapore) Izyani Ghani	
30 December 2025	GK	(Singapore) Ng Meizhi	
30 December 2025	DF	(Singapore) Monessha Nair	
8 January 2026	DF	(Singapore) Rosnani Azman	
9 January 2026	MF	(Singapore) Nur Darwisyah	

== Friendly ==
=== Pre-season ===
Win Draw Loss

== Team statistics ==
=== Appearances and goals (Women) ===
As of 17 May 25

No.	Pos.	Player	WPL		AFC Champions League		Total	
No.	Pos.	Player	Apps.	Goals	Apps.	Goals	Apps.	Goals
1	GK	(Singapore) (France) Talia Sachet	4	0	0	0	4	0
3	DF	(India) Ananya Pande	2+2	0	0	0	4	0
4	DF	(Singapore) (China) Sun Jie	4	0	0	0	4	0
5	DF	(Japan) Riho Katayama	3+1	2	0	0	4	2
6	DF	(Singapore) Nur Dawisyah Noor Haidi	0+4	0	0	0	4	0
7	MF	(South Africa) (Hungary) (England) Emily Baranyay	3	3	0	0	3	3
8	MF	(Singapore) Sitianiwati Rosielin	5	3	0	0	5	3
9	FW	(Japan) Manami Fukuzawa	5	8	0	0	5	8
11	MF	(India) Anaya Sehgal	2+1	2	0	0	3	2
13	MF	(Singapore) Joie Teo	0+5	0	0	0	5	0
14	MF	(Japan) Kana Kitahara	5	10	0	0	5	10
15	MF	(Singapore) Siti Wan Nabilah	4+1	2	0	0	5	2
16	DF	(Singapore) Nathasa Kaur	3+1	1	0	0	4	1
17	GK	(Singapore) Ng Meizhi	1+1	0	0	0	2	0
18	FW	(Japan) Ruriko Takashima	4	19	0	0	4	19
19	FW	(Japan) Ayaka Miki	1+3	1	0	0	4	1
22	MF	(Singapore) (Japan) Cocolo Kaneko	0+2	0	0	0	2	0
23	GK	(Singapore) Erlinawaty Jaffar	0+1	0	0	0	1	0
24	DF	(Singapore) Monessha Nair	1+3	0	0	0	4	0
27	DF	(Singapore) Izyani Ghani	3	2	0	0	3	2
30	DF	(Japan) (Singapore) Chiyoko Okada	0+1	0	0	0	1	0
50	DF	(Singapore) Rosnani Azman	5	1	0	0	5	1

== Competitions ==
=== Women's Premier League ===
Win Draw Loss

24 January 2026 1	Hougang United (Singapore)	0–12	(Singapore) Albirex Jurong	Choa Chu Kang
		Report	Manami Fukuzawa 2', 10', 19', 53'; Ruriko Takashima 2', 9', 12', 54', 90+2'; Kana Kitahara 10', 23'; Siti Wan Nabilah 36'	Stadium: Choa Chu Kang Stadium

1 February 2026 2	Albirex Jurong (Singapore)	17–0	(Singapore) Balestier Khalsa	Choa Chu Kang
	Manami Fukuzawa 3', 28', 63'; Kana Kitahara 6', 77', 90+3', 90+9', 90+10'; Anaya Sehgal 13', 23'; Siti Wan Nabilah 17'; Natasha Kaur 20'; Siti Nur Aishah 44' (o.g.); Sitianiwati Rosielin 45+2', 72'; Ruriko Takashima 80', 87'	Report		Stadium: Choa Chu Kang Stadium

7 February 2026 3	Still Aerion WFC (Singapore)	2–6	(Singapore) Albirex Jurong	Choa Chu Kang
	Sunisa Srangthaisong 34' (pen.); Angelyn Pang 68'	Report	Ruriko Takashima 8', 21', 40', 62', 90+1'; Kana Kitahara 52'	Stadium: Choa Chu Kang Stadium

14 February 2026 4	Albirex Jurong (Singapore)	15–0	(Singapore) Tanjong Pagar United	Choa Chu Kang
	Ruriko Takashima 8', 15', 57'; Izyani Ghani 13', 73'; Rosnani Azman 25'; Kana Kitahara 32', 38'; Ayaka Miki 34'; Riho Katayama 46', 88'; Emily Baranyay 61', 68'; Manami Fukuzawa 63'; Sitianiwati Rosielin 75'	Report		Stadium: Choa Chu Kang Stadium

21 February 2026 5	BG Tampines Rovers (Singapore)	0–5	(Singapore) Albirex Jurong	Choa Chu Kang
			Emily Baranyay 23'; Ruriko Takashima 46', 49', 74', 87'	Stadium: Choa Chu Kang Stadium

March 2026 6	Albirex Jurong (Singapore)	–	(Singapore) Geylang International	Stadium

13 March 2026 7	Lion City Sailors (Singapore)	–	(Singapore) Albirex Jurong	Bukit Gombak
				Stadium: Bukit Gombak Stadium

5 April 2026 8	Albirex Jurong (Singapore)	–	(Singapore) Tiong Bahru	Choa Chu Kang
				Stadium: Choa Chu Kang Stadium

22 April 2026 9	Albirex Jurong (Singapore)	–	(Singapore) Hougang United	Choa Chu Kang
				Stadium: Choa Chu Kang Stadium

26 April 2026 10	Balestier Khalsa (Singapore)	–	(Singapore) Albirex Jurong	Choa Chu Kang
				Stadium: Choa Chu Kang Stadium

2 May 2026 11	Albirex Jurong (Singapore)	–	(Singapore) Still Aerion WFC	Bukit Gombak
				Stadium: Bukit Gombak Stadium

9 May 2026 12	Tanjong Pagar United (Singapore)	–	(Singapore) Albirex Jurong	Bukit Gombak
				Stadium: Bukit Gombak Stadium

16 May 2026 13	Albirex Jurong (Singapore)	–	(Singapore) BG Tampines Rovers	Choa Chu Kang
				Stadium: Choa Chu Kang Stadium

23 May 2026 14	Geylang International (Singapore)	–	(Singapore) Albirex Jurong	Choa Chu Kang
				Stadium: Choa Chu Kang Stadium

12 June 2026 15	Albirex Jurong (Singapore)	–	(Singapore) Lion City Sailors	Choa Chu Kang
				Stadium: Choa Chu Kang Stadium

19 June 2026 16	Tiong Bahru (Singapore)	–	(Singapore) Albirex Jurong

League table

Pos	Team	Pld	W	D	L	GF	GA	GD	Pts	Qualification or relegation
1	Lion City Sailors (C)	16	15	0	1	166	4	+162	45	Qualification for AFC Champions League
2	Albirex Jurong	16	15	0	1	140	6	+134	45	
3	Still Aerion	16	11	1	4	52	27	+25	34	
4	Geylang International	16	10	1	5	44	28	+16	31	
5	BG Tampines Rovers	16	7	1	8	30	58	−28	22	
6	Tanjong Pagar United	16	3	3	10	8	75	−67	12	
7	Balestier Khalsa	16	4	0	12	19	107	−88	12	
8	Tiong Bahru (R)	16	1	2	13	16	64	−48	5	Play-off with WNL runners-up
9	Hougang United (R)	16	1	2	13	9	115	−106	5	Relegation to National League

Updated to match(es) played on 5 July 2026. Source: Women's Premier League
Rules for classification: 1) points; 2) goal difference; 3) number of goals scored; 4) number of wins
(C) League champions; (R) Relegated
