= Norihiko Machida =

Japanese music producer

Norihiko Machida (町田紀彦, born August 8, 1976) is a Japanese music producer, lyricist, and composer from Sapporo, Japan. He was formerly affiliated with Studio Runtime (now Runtime Music Academy), an entertainment school operated by Runtime Music Entertainment. During his time there, Machida played a central role in the musical production of the all-girl pop-rock band ZONE.

== Career ==
Machida is best known for writing and composing "secret base 〜Kimi ga Kureta Mono〜" (2001), which became one of ZONE's signature songs. Released on August 8, 2001, the single gained popularity over time and ultimately peaked at No. 2 on the Oricon Singles Chart. He continued to contribute many songs for ZONE, establishing himself as an influential figure in the J-pop scene during the early 2000s.

Around 2005, coinciding with ZONE’s disbandment, Machida left Runtime. Since then, he has largely stepped away from the music industry. In 2012, he was credited as the composer of "Ashita e no Kaerimichi" (明日への帰り道), a single by the voice actress group Sphere, marking his only known musical contribution in the years following his departure from Runtime.

== Songs ==
- believe in love (ZONEの曲) (1999)
- secret base 〜Kimi ga Kureta Mono〜 (2001)
- 夢ノカケラ… (2002)
- 証 (ZONEの曲) (2002)
- 白い花 (ZONEの曲) (2002)
- true blue/恋々… (2003)
- H・A・N・A・B・I〜君がいた夏〜 (2003)
- 僕の手紙 (2003)
- Non stop road/明日への帰り道 (2012)

== Reception ==
Machida’s most iconic work, "secret base 〜Kimi ga Kureta Mono〜", has left a lasting impact on Japanese pop culture. The emotional lyrics and nostalgic melody have resonated with audiences. The song was covered by Ai Kayano, Haruka Tomatsu, and Saori Hayami for the anime Anohana: The Flower We Saw That Day (2011), which reintroduced the song to a wider audience.
