= 2026 Women's Premier League (Singapore) =

25th season of the Singapore Women's Premier League

Women's Premier League
- Season: 2026
- Dates: 24 January – 5 July
- Champions: Lion City Sailors
- Relegated: Hougang United; Tiong Bahru
- AFC Champions League: Lion City Sailors
- Matches: 72
- Goals: 484 (6.72 per match)
- Top goalscorer: (Japan) Ami Takeuchi (60 goals)
- Biggest home win: LCS 20–0 Hougang (4 Apr 2026)
- Biggest away win: Hougang 0–20 LCS (27 June 2026)
- Highest scoring: LCS 20–0 Hougang (4 April 2026); Hougang 0–20 LCS (27 June 2026)
- All statistics correct as of 5 July 2026.

The 2026 Women's Premier League was the 25th season of the Women's Premier League in Singapore. The season began on 24 January and ended on 5 July 2026.

== Summary ==
The 2026 season introduced a series of structural and regulatory adjustments designed to strengthen competition and provide clearer pathways for player development.

The season will see a return of promotion and relegation between the Premier League and National League.

The 2026 league champions will be awarded S$25,000. While the prize money remains the same for the champions, the prize money will be revised for the second and third-placed team. The first and second runners-up will receive S$20,000, up from $10,000, and S$17,000, up from $7,500, respectively. All the WPL's matches will be played at Choa Chu Kang Stadium.

The 2026 WPL will feature nine teams competing across 18 match weeks, with matches scheduled to be played at Bukit Gombak Stadium and Choa Chu Kang Stadium. All WPL matches will be live-streamed throughout the season.

The 2026 season will also see the introduction of WPL B-teams to allow WPL clubs to field a developmental squad in the WNL. Clubs may include up to five B-team players in their match-day squad.

On 27 Nov 2025, Albirex Niigata (S) announced that they will change their club name to Albirex Jurong in 2026. Their youth and women’s teams will adopt the new emblem and name from 1 Jan 2026. The 2026 season will mark the club's first season in the WPL under Albirex Jurong.

== Teams ==
A total of 9 teams competed in the league.

Team	Head coach	Team list
Albirex Jurong	Kana Kitahara	2026
Balestier Khalsa	Farhan Farook	
Hougang United	Al-Ameen Maricar	
Geylang International	Ratna Suffian	
Lion City Sailors	Daniel Ong	2026
Still Aerion WFC	Jeremy Chiang	2026
BG Tampines Rovers	Hafeez Shahni	2026
Tanjong Pagar United	Samawira Basri	2026
Tiong Bahru FC	Loh Ngiap Tai	2026

=== Squad list ===
Albirex Jurong	Balestier Khalsa	BG Tampines Rovers	Geylang International	Hougang United	Lion City Sailors	Still Aerion WFC	Tanjong Pagar United	Tiong Bahru									
Albirex Jurong	Balestier Khalsa	BG Tampines Rovers	Geylang International	Hougang United	Lion City Sailors	Still Aerion WFC	Tanjong Pagar United	Tiong Bahru	(Singapore) (1) Talia Sachet (Japan) (2) Manami Uchida (India) (3) Ananya Pande (Singapore) (4) Sun Jie (Japan) (5) Riho Katayama (Singapore) (6) Nur Dawisyah (South Africa) (7) Emily Baranyay (Singapore) (8) Sitianiwati Rosielin (Japan) (9) Manami Fukuzawa (India) (11) Anaya Sehgal (Singapore) (13) Joie Teo (Japan) (14) Kana Kitahara (Singapore) (15) Siti Wan Nabilah (Singapore) (16) Nathasa Kaur (Singapore) (17) Ng Meizhi (Japan) (18) Ruriko Takashima (Japan) (19) Ayaka Miki (Singapore) (20) Sara Merican (Japan) (22) Cocolo Kaneko (Singapore) (23) Erlinawaty Jaffar (Singapore) (24) Monessha Nair (Singapore) (27) Izyani Ghani (Japan) (30) Chiyoko Okada (Singapore) (50) Rosnani Azman	(Singapore) (1) Adra Nur Qaisara (Singapore) (2) Nur Insyirah (Singapore) (3) Noordiyanah Norazhar (Singapore) (4) Siti Nur Aishah (Singapore) (5) Vafa Dabhitah (Singapore) (6) Iffah (Singapore) (7) Svea Hertzman (Singapore) (9) Maidah Mahboob (Malaysia) (10) Hannah Teo (Singapore) (11) Lavanya Gurunathan (Singapore) (12) Sharifah Amanina (Singapore) (13) Laura Tatiana (Singapore) (14) Dini Aleeya (Singapore) (15) Yumi Ng (Singapore) (17) Sofea Ayu (Singapore) (18) Ariel Isabelle Mahachai (Singapore) (19) Nurshamirah Norshaidi (Singapore) (20) Bernice Ong (Singapore) (21) Andrea Antasha (Singapore) (22) Alia Ming Ballout (Singapore) (24) Dinah Sajida (Singapore) (25) Syifaa Nurdianah	(Singapore) (1) Atiqah Salihin (Singapore) (2) Nursabrina Iskandar (United States) (3) Jia Samra (Singapore) (4) Vivian Eng (Canada) (5) Kinley Melski (United Kingdom) (6) Maya Stephen (Singapore) (7) Shazana Ashiq (United States) (8) Cristina Clavel (United Kingdom) (9) Victoria Hudson (Singapore) (10) Nahwah Aidilreza (Singapore) (11) Darvina Halini (Singapore) (12) Fitrizah Fitrii (Singapore) (13) Shaniz Qistina (Singapore) (14) Sharifah Amira (Singapore) (16) Aqilah Salihin (Singapore) (18) Nurul Haziqah (United Kingdom) (19) Beatrix Ong-Pratt (Singapore) (21) Sophie Lee (Canada) (22) Mia Thomson (Singapore) (23) Izzati Safwanah (Singapore) (24) Erika Seah (Singapore) (25) Lyra Rippon (United Kingdom) (33) Lucinda Ratcliffe	(Singapore) (1) Nurul Illyanis (England) (2) Lily Clayton (China) (3) Vanessa Han (Singapore) (4) Siti Fathimah (Singapore) (5) Saranya Thiru (Singapore) (6) Syuhadah Nuraziman (Singapore) (7) Nadhra Aqilah (Singapore) (8) Nurfarah Tahir (Singapore) (10) Nasriah Ibrahim (Singapore) (11) Mastura Jeilani (Singapore) (12) Elyssa Qistina (Singapore) (13) Naureen Qadriyah (Singapore) (14) Humairah Ibrahim (Singapore) (15) Hamizah Talib (Singapore) (16) Sarah Zu’risqha (Singapore) (17) Nabilla Aina (Singapore) (18) Rayna Balqis (Singapore) (20) Afiqah Azman (Singapore) (21) Rochelle Chan (Singapore) (22) Farhanah Ruhaizat (Singapore) (23) Alvina Chik (Australia) (24) Olliana Davies (Australia) (25) Kristen Brown (Wales) (26) Lauren Reese (Singapore) (27) Imarsha Peer Ali (Singapore) (32) Faizah Ramle (Singapore) (44) Nadia Nuraffendi	(Singapore) (1) Nurul Faizah (Singapore) (2) Rachel Liew (Singapore) (3) Ishita Pathania (Singapore) (5) Michelle Ngui (Singapore) (6) Iffah Amrin (Singapore) (7) Fathimah Syaakirah (Singapore) (8) Angela Hu (South Korea) (9) Park Claire (China) (10) Su Jingyi (Singapore) (11) Rachel Ngui (Singapore) (12) Nadirah Jeffere (Singapore) (13) Devina Beins (Singapore) (14) Natasha Tan (Singapore) (14) Fasha Umaiza (Singapore) (16) Rabiatul Ardawiyah (Singapore) (17) Naqiba Azlin (Singapore) (18) Tay Siew Yin (Singapore) (19) Fatin Syarafana (Singapore) (21) Anna Vaswani (Singapore) (23) Natasha Richards (Singapore) (25) Ng Shi Xuan (Singapore) (29) Syafina Putri (Singapore) (48) Grace Monago (Singapore) (50) Venya Jain Former (Singapore) (14) Tiana Shah Nabella (Singapore) (25) Nabilah Jeffere	(Singapore) (1) Izairida Shakira (Singapore) (4) Nur Umairah (Singapore) (5) Irsalina Irwan (Japan) (6) Eri Kitagawa (Singapore) (7) Dhaniyah Qasimah (Singapore) (8) Syazwani Ruzi (Singapore) (9) Raeka Ee (Singapore) (10) Farah Nurzahirah (Japan) (11) Ami Takeuchi (Singapore) (16) Tyan Foong (Singapore) (17) Khairunnisa Anwar (Japan) (18) Remi Ogawa (Singapore) (19) Izzati Rosni (France) (21) Priscille Le Helloco (Singapore) (22) Beatrice Tan (Singapore) (23) Alysha Nasrina (Singapore) (24) Nurhidayu Naszri (Singapore) (27) Tia Foong (Malaysia) (28) Putri Alyiah Seow (Singapore) (30) Wan Nashirah (Singapore) (32) Nur Ain Salleh (Singapore) (33) Siti Nurerwadah Erwan (Singapore) (48) Venetia Lim (Singapore) (59) Amelia Ng (Japan) (60) Ami Kawase (United States) (62) Indra Lewin Wei (Finland) (88) Sofia Rusi Former (Singapore) (20) Sarah Zu’risqha	(Singapore) (1) Hazel Lim (Singapore) (3) Angelyn Pang (Singapore) (4) Janet Tan (Singapore) (5) Bhanu Krishnasamy (Singapore) (6) Fonda Chai (Thailand) (7) Pikul Khueanpet (Mexico) (9) Andrea Moska (Singapore) (10) Nicole Lim (Thailand) (11) Sunisa Srangthaisong (Singapore) (12) Nurul Unaisah (Singapore) (14) Calista Dodson (Singapore) (15) Berince Lim (United States) (17) Mikayla Simons (Singapore) (18) Anna Seng (Singapore) (19) Ayla Chin (Singapore) (21) Zoey Chua (Singapore) (22) Lutfiah Hannah (Singapore) (23) Nur Afiqah (Singapore) (25) Rachel Chan (Singapore) (27) Riddle Reneelyn Sison (Australia) (28) Isabella Rose Edward (Singapore) (45) Dinni Dannisha (Singapore) (58) Pamela Kong (Singapore) (60) Putri Alyssa Rianna (Singapore) (64) Jasmine Kua (Singapore) (91) Hannah Tasha (Singapore) (96) Zhang Ke Qing	(Singapore) (1) Ilya Batrisyia (Singapore) (2) Abigail Goh (Singapore) (4) Shayeerah Huq (Singapore) (5) Naomi Tan (Singapore) (6) Syuhadah Nuraziman (Singapore) (7) Syakirah Jumain (Singapore) (9) Matthea Ashwini (Singapore) (10) Nuriah Noor (Singapore) (11) Alyssa Deanna (Singapore) (12) Gan Hui Yi (Singapore) (13) Anupriya Subramanian (Singapore) (14) Denise Chu (Singapore) (15) Crystal Wu (Singapore) (16) Dewi Safira (Singapore) (17) Faradila Rafidi (England) (18) Eden Smith (Singapore) (19) Maisarah Azhari (Singapore) (22) Pan Shi Yu (Singapore) (23) Abigail Heng (Singapore) (24) Vanessa Tan (Singapore) (25) Gillian Chang (Singapore) (26) Shafiqah Ali	(Singapore) (1) Lynse Sng (Singapore) (2) Joey Cheng (Singapore) (4) Deanna Lim (Singapore) (5) Celine Koh (Singapore) (6) Lee Lai Kuan (Singapore) (7) Nellie Teow (Singapore) (9) Safura Ali (Singapore) (10) Lim Li Xian (Singapore) (11) Nurzaherra Maisarah (Singapore) (12) Ezyan Qalisa (Singapore) (13) Yap Hui Xian (Singapore) (14) Nurzaherra Maisarah (Singapore) (15) Nur Baddriyyah (Singapore) (16) Claris Gan (Singapore) (17) Tang Kai Qing (Singapore) (18) Marge Wee (Singapore) (19) Christine Gan (Singapore) (21) Ng Hwee En (Singapore) (22) Elrina Sulaiman (Singapore) (24) Lovelle Lee (Singapore) (26) Larissa Orthmann (Australia) (27) Belina Julia Moon (Singapore) (30) Liew Tze Shyan (Singapore) (34) Ho Wen Jin

== Foreign players ==
All teams may register a maximum of four foreign players with a minimum age of sixteen and above at the point of registration.

Permanent Residents and foreign nationals who have resided in Singapore continuously for at least three years starting from 1 January 2023 may be registered as local players, subject to FAS approval.

Players name in bold indicates the player was registered during the mid-season transfer window.

Team	Player 1	Player 2	Player 3	Player 4	Foreigners registered as local	Former players
Albirex Jurong	(Japan) Ruriko Takashima	(India) Ananya Pande	(India) Anaya Sehgal	(South Africa) Emily Baranyay	(Japan) Kana Kitahara (Japan) Manami Fukuzawa (Japan) Ayaka Miki	
Balestier Khalsa	(Malaysia) Hannah Teo					
BG Tampines Rovers	(Canada) Kinley Melski	(United States) Jia Samra			(United States) Cristina Clavel (United Kingdom) Victoria Hudson (United Kingdom) Lucinda Ratcliffe (United Kingdom) Maya Stephen (United Kingdom) Beatrix Ong-Pratt (Canada) Mia Thomson	
Geylang International	(Australia) Kristen Brown	(Australia) Olliana Davies	(England) Lily Clayton	(Wales) Lauren Reese		
Hougang United	(South Korea) Park Claire	(China) Su Jingyi				
Lion City Sailors	(Japan) Ami Takeuchi	(Japan) Eri Kitagawa	(Japan) Remi Ogawa	(Malaysia) Putri Alyiah Seow	(France) Priscille Le Helloco (Japan) Ami Kawase (United States) Indra Lewin	
Still Aerion	(Australia) Isabella Rose Edwards	(United States) Mikayla Simons	(Thailand) Sunisa Srangthaisong		(Mexico) Andrea Moska (Philippines) Riddle Reneelyn Sison	(Thailand) Pikul Khueanpet
Tanjong Pagar United	(England) Eden Smith					
Tiong Bahru	(Australia) Belina Julia					

== League table ==
Pos	Team	Pld	W	D	L	GF	GA	GD	Pts	Qualification or relegation
1	Lion City Sailors (C)	16	15	0	1	166	4	+162	45	Qualification for AFC Champions League
2	Albirex Jurong	16	15	0	1	140	6	+134	45	
3	Still Aerion	16	11	1	4	52	27	+25	34	
4	Geylang International	16	10	1	5	44	28	+16	31	
5	BG Tampines Rovers	16	7	1	8	30	58	−28	22	
6	Tanjong Pagar United	16	3	3	10	8	75	−67	12	
7	Balestier Khalsa	16	4	0	12	19	107	−88	12	
8	Tiong Bahru (R)	16	1	2	13	16	64	−48	5	Play-off with WNL runners-up
9	Hougang United (R)	16	1	2	13	9	115	−106	5	Relegation to National League

Source: Women's Premier League
Rules for classification: 1) points; 2) goal difference; 3) number of goals scored; 4) number of wins
(C) League champions; (R) Relegated

== Fixtures and results ==
Home \ Away	ALB	BAL	GEY	HOU	LCS	SAW	TAM	TIB	TPU
Albirex Jurong		17–0	2–0	15–0	2–4	6–0	7–0	6–0	15–0
Balestier Khalsa	0–15		0–4	4–1	0–16	0–5	1–6	4–3	0–3
Geylang International	0–4	4–0		9–0	0–6	0–0	4–0	5–2	4–1
Hougang United	0–12	0–4	1–5		0–20	2–6	1–3	2–1	1–2
Lion City Sailors	0–2	15–0	8–0	20–0		1–0	12–0	12–0	11–0
Still Aerion	2–6	8–1	3–1	7–0	0–9		3–0	2–0	5–0
BG Tampines Rovers	0–5	4–0	1–4	6–0	0–13	1–6		4–0	0–0
Tiong Bahru	0–10	6–1	0–3	1–1	0–7	0–2	2–3		1–1
Tanjong Pagar United	0–16	0–4	0–1	0–0	0–12	0–3	0–2	1–0	

Updated to match(es) played on 5 July 2026. Source: Football Association of Singapore
Legend: Blue = home team win; Yellow = draw; Red = away team win.

Promotion/Relegation Play-off

5 Jul 2026	Tiong Bahru	1-1 (3-4 p)	Unity FC	Choa Chu Kang
17:00 UTC+8	Joey 65'	Report	Anna 71'	Stadium: Choa Chu Kang Stadium
Note: Unity FC will be promoted to the 2027 Women's Premier League, while Tiong Bahru will be relegated to Women's National League.

== Top scorers ==
Updated 5 July 2026)
Rank	Player	Team	Goals
1	Ami Takeuchi	Lion City Sailors	60
2	Ruriko Takashima	Albirex Jurong	43
3	Eri Kitagawa	Lion City Sailors	33
4	Kana Kitahara	Albirex Jurong	28
5	Manami Fukuzawa	Albirex Jurong	24

== Awards ==
To be announced in 2027
