= 2026 Women's National League (Singapore) =

Women's National League
- Season: 2026
- Dates: 7 February - 21 June 2026
- Champions: Lion City Sailors 'B'
- Runner up: Frenz GDT Circuit
- Promoted: Frenz GDT Circuit; Unity FC
- Matches: 65
- Goals: 299 (4.6 per match)
- Top goalscorer: (Singapore) Amelia Tan (22 goals)
- Biggest home win: LCS 'B' 13-2 Kaki Bukit (22 Feb 2026); LCS 'B' 11-0 GDT Circuit (7 Mar 2026)
- Biggest away win: SFA Girls 0-12 LCS 'B' (15 Feb 2026)
- Highest scoring: LCS 'B' 13-2 Kaki Bukit (22 Feb 2026)
- Longest winning run: Lion City Sailors 'B' (13 matches)
- Longest unbeaten run: Lion City Sailors 'B' (13 matches)
- All statistics correct as of 21 June 2026.

The 2026 Women's National League of the Football Association of Singapore (FAS) is the 8th season of the Women's National League since the introduction in 2017.

The season started on 7 February 2026.

== Summary ==
On 1 December 2025, Football Association of Singapore (FAS) extended an invitation to non-member clubs and teams to participate in the 2026 Women’s National League (WNL).

It was reported that 11 teams, including development B teams from Lion City Sailors FC and Still Aerion WFC will participate in the 2026 season. However, there are only 10 teams participating in the National League.

The 2026 season will see a return of promotion and relegation between Premier League or National League clubs. However, the 'B' teams participating in the WNL will not be eligible for portion to the WPL. Promotion and relegation between the two leagues last took place during the 2019 season.

The introduction of development ‘B’ teams will also allow 'B' teams to include a maximum of five (5) Players from its WPL Team. All players in the WPL ‘B’ Team shall each be assigned a unique jersey number from 51 to 99.

Lion City Sailors ‘B’ were officially crowned 2026 Women’s National League champions following the conclusion of the Top Tier stage at Choa Chu Kang Stadium on 14 June 2026. Their title had been confirmed after defeating Frenz GDT Circuit 6-0 on 6 June 2026. Frenz GDT Circuit will be promoted to the Women's Premier League next season, while Unity FC will be playing against the second-bottom side in the 2026 WPL in the promotion play-off.

== Competition Format ==
The 2026 Women's National League shall be played on a one and a half round robin League basis. Upon completion of the first round of WNL, the league shall be split into two tiers, with the top five teams forming the “Top Tier” and the bottom five teams forming the “Bottom Tier”.

The teams in each tier shall only play the teams in the same tier once, in a “single round-robin” league format. If a team from the “Bottom Tier” ends the season with a higher points tally than a team from the “Top Tier” in the WNL, the team shall still remain in the “Bottom Tier” (6th to 10th positions).

== Teams ==
A total of ten teams will be competing in the league.

Royal Arion WFC, affiliated to Still Aerion WFC, will not be participating in the 2026 season. Still Aerion WFC will be sending their development 'B' team to participate in the National League. Lion City Sailors will also be sending their development team to participate in the WNL.

Katong FC women's team and SFA Combined Girls are the other two new teams that will be participating in the 2026 season.

Team	Head coach	Team List
Eastern Thunder FC		
Frenz GDT Circuit FC		
Jungfrau Punggol FC	Kunkhen Lim	2026
Kaki Bukit SC		2026
Katong FC		
Lion City Sailors 'B'		2026
Mattar Sailors		2026
SFA Combined Girls		
Still Aerion 'B'		2026
Unity FC		

== League table ==
Pos	Team	Pld	W	D	L	GF	GA	GD	Pts	Remarks
1	Lion City Sailors 'B' (Note: WPL 'B' teams participating in the WNL will not be eligible for promotion to the WPL next season.) (C)	13	13	0	0	82	5	+77	39	Champions
2	Frenz GDT Circuit FC (P)	13	10	0	3	54	27	+27	30	Promotion to Premier League
3	Still Aerion 'B'	13	9	0	4	30	15	+15	27	
4	Unity FC (Note: Unity FC will be promoted after defeating Tiong Bahru in a penalty shootout on 5 July 2026.) (P, O)	13	6	1	6	24	19	+5	19	Play-off with WPL 8th place
5	Katong FC	13	4	3	6	13	38	−25	15	
6	Jungfrau Punggol FC	13	7	0	6	25	26	−1	21	Bottom Tier (Note: Teams in 6th to 10th position after first round form the Bottom Tier)
7	Mattar Sailors FC	13	4	1	8	19	22	−3	13	Bottom Tier
8	Kaki Bukit SC	13	4	0	9	26	54	−28	12	Bottom Tier
9	Eastern Thunder FC	13	3	1	9	19	28	−9	10	Bottom Tier
10	SFA Combined Girls	13	2	0	11	7	65	−58	6	Bottom Tier

Source: FAS
Rules for classification: 1) points; 2) goal difference; 3) number of goals scored; 4) number of wins
(C) Champions; (O) Play-off winners; (P) Promoted

== Fixtures and results ==
First Round

7 Feb 2026 1	Unity FC	1-0	Mattar Sailors	XCL World Academy
15:00 UTC+8

7 Feb 2026 2	Frenz GDT Circuit	9-0	Katong FC	SRC Ayer Rajah Field
UTC+8	Henrietta Justine; Nurul Nadia		Goal

8 Feb 2026 3	Lion City Sailors 'B'	3-1	Jungfrau Punggol	Regent Secondary
19:00 UTC+8	Amelia Tan		Goal

8 Feb 2026 4	Kaki Bukit	4-6	Eastern Thunder	Regent Secondary
17:00 UTC+8	Azura Azlan; Batrisyia Baharudin	Report	Brittanie Barlett 6', 8'; Elizabeth Tan; Tina; Janine

8 Feb 2026 5	Still Aerion 'B'	2-1	SFA Combined Girls	Choa Chu Kang
19:30 UTC+8	Izzy 48'; Anna Seng 50'	Report	Goal	Stadium: Choa Chu Kang Stadium; Player of the Match: J. Kua

14 Feb 2026 6	Eastern Thunder	1-2	Frenz GDT Circuit	SRC Ayer Rajah Field
19:00 UTC+8	Chelsea	Report	Henrietta Justine; Qarissa Putri

14 Feb 2026 7	Katong FC	0-0	Unity FC	XCL Academy
UTC+8

15 Feb 2026 8	Jungfrau Punggol	0-2	Mattar Sailors	Choa Chu Kang
17:00 UTC+8		Report	Hannah Tasha; Risya Rizqyqa	Stadium: Choa Chu Kang Stadium

15 Feb 2026 9	SFA Combined Girls	0-12	Lion City Sailors 'B'	Choa Chu Kang
UTC+8				Stadium: Choa Chu Kang Stadium

15 Feb 2026 10	Still Aerion 'B'	6-1	Kaki Bukit	Bukit Gombak
17:00 UTC+8	Afiqah 14', 56'; Linnèa 17'; Zoey 25'; Anna Seng 48', 79'	Report	Goal	Stadium: Bukit Gombak Stadium; Player of the Match: Anna

22 Feb 2026 11	Lion City Sailors 'B'	13-2	Kaki Bukit	LCS Training Centre
19:00 UTC+8

22 Feb 2026 12	Mattar Sailors	6-0	SFA Combined Girls	Choa Chu Kang
19:45 UTC+8				Stadium: Choa Chu Kang Stadium

28 Feb 2026 13	Unity FC	3-0	Jungfrau Punggol	Choa Chu Kang
19:45 UTC+8				Stadium: Choa Chu Kang Stadium

28 Feb 2026 14	Frenz GDT Circuit	1-0	Still Aerion 'B'	SRC Ayer Rajah Field
20:00 UTC+8	Atiqah Hazirah	Report

1 Mar 2026 15	Katong FC	1-1	Eastern Thunder	Choa Chu Kang
19:45 UTC+8	Dika	Report		Stadium: Choa Chu Kang Stadium

7 Mar 2026 16	SFA Combined Girls	0-5	Jungfrau Punggol	Choa Chu Kang
19:45 UTC+8				Stadium: Choa Chu Kang Stadium

7 Mar 2026 17	Lion City Sailors 'B'	11-0	Frenz GDT Circuit	SRC Ayer Rajah Field
20:00 UTC+8

8 Mar 2026 18	Eastern Thunder	0-1	Unity FC	Choa Chu Kang
19:45 UTC+8				Stadium: Choa Chu Kang Stadium

15 Mar 2026 19	Kaki Bukit	2-1	Mattar Sailors	LCS Training Centre
19:00 UTC+8

15 Mar 2026 20	Still Aerion 'B'	3-1	Katong FC	Choa Chu Kang
19:45 UTC+8	Isabella 58'; Zoey 77'; Ashley 78'	Report	Dika	Stadium: Choa Chu Kang Stadium; Player of the Match: Isabella

28 Mar 2026 21	Unity FC	4-0	SFA Combined Girls	XCL World Academy
15:00 UTC+8

28 Mar 2026 22	Mattar Sailors	0-6	Frenz GDT Circuit	SRC Ayer Rajah Field
19:00 UTC+8		Report	Aerich Jiayu; Atiqah Hazirah; Nadia Roslan; Henrietta Justine

29 Mar 2026 23	Jungfrau Punggol	5-1	Kaki Bukit	Choa Chu Kang
17:00 UTC+8				Stadium: Choa Chu Kang Stadium

29 Mar 2026 24	Katong FC	1-4	Lion City Sailors 'B'	Bukit Gombak
17:00 UTC+8				Stadium: Bukit Gombak Stadium

29 Mar 2026 25	Eastern Thunder	0-2	Still Aerion 'B'	Choa Chu Kang
19:30 UTC+8		Report	Mikayla 78'; Isabella 83'	Stadium: Choa Chu Kang Stadium; Player of the Match: Isabella

11 Apr 2026 26	Still Aerion 'B'	2-1	Unity FC	XCL World Academy
15:00 UTC+8	Ashley 39'; Angie 82'	Report

11 Apr 2026 27	Frenz GDT Circuit	5-2	Jungfrau Punggol	SRC Ayer Rajah Field
19:00 UTC+8	Masyita Tajib; Atiqah Hazirah; Henrietta Justine	Report

12 Apr 2026 28	Lion City Sailors 'B'	7-0	Eastern Thunder	Choa Chu Kang
17:00 UTC+8				Stadium: Choa Chu Kang Stadium

12 Apr 2026 29	Kaki Bukit	1-2	SFA Combined Girls	Bukit Gombak
17:00 UTC+8				Stadium: Bukit Gombak Stadium

12 Apr 2026 30	Mattar Sailors	0-0	Katong FC	Choa Chu Kang
19:30 UTC+8				Stadium: Choa Chu Kang Stadium

18 Apr 2026 31	Unity FC	P-P	Kaki Bukit	XCL World Academy
15:00 UTC+8
Note: The match was rescheduled to 10 May 2026.

18 Apr 2026 33	Still Aerion 'B'	0-3	Lion City Sailors 'B'	XCL World Academy
15:00 UTC+8
Note: The match was originally scheduled for 19 April 2026.

18 Apr 2026 32	SFA Combined Girls	0-11	Frenz GDT Circuit	SRC Ayer Rajah Field
19:00 UTC+8

19 Apr 2026 34	Eastern Thunder	0-3	Mattar Sailors	Bukit Gombak
15:00 UTC+8				Stadium: Bukit Gombak Stadium

19 Apr 2026 35	Jungfrau Punggol	0-4	Katong FC	Choa Chu Kang
19:30 UTC+8				Stadium: Choa Chu Kang Stadium

25 Apr 2026 36	Jungfrau Punggol	P-P	Eastern Thunder	Unity Secondary
15:00 UTC+8
Note: The match was rescheduled to 10 May 2026.

25 Apr 2026 37	Frenz GDT Circuit	5-1	Kaki Bukit	SRC Ayer Rajah Field
19:00 UTC+8	Nayli Elvira; Henrietta Justine; Nurul Nadia	Report

26 Apr 2026 38	Mattar Sailors	0-2	Still Aerion 'B'	Unity Secondary School
15:00 UTC+8		Report	Nicole 15'; Putri 58'

26 Apr 2026 39	Katong FC	3-2	SFA Combined Girls	Unity Secondary
17:00 UTC+8

26 Apr 2026 40	Lion City Sailors 'B'	3-0	Unity FC	Choa Chu Kang
19:30 UTC+8				Stadium: Choa Chu Kang Stadium

2 May 2026 41	Unity FC	1-2	Frenz GDT Circuit	XCL World Academy
15:00 UTC+8		Report	Masyita Tajib; Nur Insyiarah

3 May 2026 42	SFA Combined Girls	0-8	Eastern Thunder	Bukit Gombak
19:30 UTC+8				Stadium: Bukit Gombak Stadium

3 May 2026 43	Kaki Bukit	1-2	Katong FC	Choa Chu Kang
17:00 UTC+8				Stadium: Choa Chu Kang Stadium

3 May 2026 44	Still Aerion 'B'	6-0	Jungfrau Punggol	Bukit Gombak
17:00 UTC+8	Zoey Chua 16'; Ashley 31'; Anna Seng 41'; Isabella Edwards 45+1', 66'; Alyssa 52'	Report		Stadium: Bukit Gombak Stadium

3 May 2026 45	Lion City Sailors 'B'	4-0	Mattar Sailors	Choa Chu Kang
19:30 UTC+8				Stadium: Choa Chu Kang Stadium

10 May 2026 31*	Unity FC	8-1	Kaki Bukit	Bukit Gombak
UTC+8				Stadium: Bukit Gombak Stadium
Note: The match was rescheduled from 18 Apr 2026.

10 May 2026 36*	Jungfrau Punggol	2-0	Eastern Thunder	Choa Chu Kang
19:30 UTC+8				Stadium: Choa Chu Kang Stadium
Note: The match was rescheduled from 25 Apr 2026.

Second Round

9 May 2026 46	Katong FC	0-7	Frenz GDT Circuit	SRC Ayer Rajah Field
19:00 UTC+8		Report	Masyita Tajib; Nurul Nadia; Henrietta Justine

10 May 2026 47	Still Aerion 'B'	0-3	Lion City Sailors 'B'	Choa Chu Kang
UTC+8				Stadium: Choa Chu Kang Stadium

16 May 2026 48	Frenz GDT Circuit	5-1	Unity FC	Choa Chu Kang
19:00 UTC+8	Qarissa Putri; Nurul Nadia; Nur Hannah; Atiqah Hazirah	Report		Stadium: Choa Chu Kang Stadium

17 May 2026 49	Katong FC	0-3	Still Aerion 'B'	SRC Ayer Rajah Field
17:00 UTC+8		Report	Libby 20'; Anna Seng 63'; Isabella Edwards 88'	Player of the Match: Isabella Edwards

17 May 2026 50	Mattar Sailors	1-2	Eastern Thunder	Bukit Gombak
17:00 UTC+8		Report	Brittanie	Stadium: Bukit Gombak Stadium

17 May 2026 51	Jungfrau Punggol	5-0	SFA Combined Girls	Choa Chu Kang
19:30 UTC+8				Stadium: Choa Chu Kang Stadium

23 May 2026 52	Unity FC	3-0	Still Aerion 'B'	XCL World Academy
15:00 UTC+8		Report

24 May 2026 53	Lion City Sailors 'B'	8-0	Katong FC	Choa Chu Kang
17:00 UTC+8				Stadium: Choa Chu Kang Stadium

24 May 2026 54	Jungfrau Punggol	3-2	Kaki Bukit	Bukit Gombak
17:00 UTC+8				Stadium: Bukit Gombak Stadium

24 May 2026 55	SFA Combined Girls	1-4	Mattar Sailors	Choa Chu Kang
19:30 UTC+8				Stadium: Choa Chu Kang Stadium

6 Jun 2026 56	Unity FC	0-1	Katong FC	XCL World Academy
15:00 UTC+8

6 Jun 2026 57	Frenz GDT Circuit	0-6	Lion City Sailors 'B'	SRC Ayer Rajah Field
19:00 UTC+8

7 Jun 2026 58	Eastern Thunder	0-1	Jungfrau Punggol	Bukit Gombak
17:00 UTC+8			Erica	Stadium: Bukit Gombak Stadium

7 Jun 2026 59	Kaki Bukit	4-0	SFA Combined Girls	Bukit Gombak
19:30 UTC+8				Stadium: Bukit Gombak Stadium

14 Jun 2026 60	Still Aerion 'B'	4-1	Frenz GDT Circuit	Bukit Gombak
19:30 UTC+8	Anna Seng 2'; Ashley Tan 14', 33'; Sunisa S. 21'		Nur Hannah	Stadium: Bukit Gombak Stadium; Player of the Match: Ashley Tan

14 Jun 2026 61	Lion City Sailors 'B'	5-1	Unity FC	Choa Chu Kang
19:30 UTC+8	Aria Romano; Madison Telmer; Alicia Geste			Stadium: Choa Chu Kang Stadium

14 Jun 2026 62	Mattar Sailors	0-1	Jungfrau Punggol	Bukit Gombak
19:30 UTC+8				Stadium: Bukit Gombak Stadium

14 Jun 2026 63	Eastern Thunder	1-3	Kaki Bukit	Choa Chu Kang
19:30 UTC+8				Stadium: Choa Chu Kang Stadium

21 Jun 2026 64	Kaki Bukit	3-2	Mattar Sailors	Bukit Gombak
17:00 UTC+8				Stadium: Bukit Gombak Stadium

21 Jun 2026 65	SFA Combined Girls	1-0	Eastern Thunder	Kallang Football Hub
17:00 UTC+8

=== Promotion/Relegation Play-off ===
5 Jul 2026	Tiong Bahru	1-1 (3-4 p)	Unity FC	Choa Chu Kang
17:00 UTC+8	Joey 65'	Report	Anna 71'	Stadium: Choa Chu Kang Stadium

== Statistics ==
=== Top scorers ===
As of 14 June 2026

Rank	Player	Club	Goals
1	(Singapore) Amelia Tan	Lion City Sailors 'B'	22
2	(Malaysia) Henrietta Justine	Frenz GDT Circuit	19
3	(Singapore) Nurul Nadia	Frenz GDT Circuit	13

== Awards ==
To be announced at the end of the season

== See also ==
- 2026 Women's Premier League (Singapore)
- Football in Singapore
- Football Association of Singapore
