= 2026 Lion City Sailors Women season =

Lion City Sailors
2026 season
- Owner: Garena
- Chairman: Forrest Li
- Head coach: Daniel Ong
Home colours	Away colours	Third colours

The 2026 season marks the Lion City Sailors Women's fifth consecutive season in the top flight of Singapore football and in the Women's Premier League. The team will be looking to rebound from last year setback when they failed to finish as champion in the league for the first time in 3 years.

== Kits ==
Kits using Puma's trademark
Home	Away	Goalkeeper Home ^{1}	Goalkeeper Away ^{2}

== Squad ==
=== Women squad (LCS) ===
Squad No.	Name	Nationality	Date of birth (age)	Previous club	Contract since	Contract end
Goalkeeper
1	Izairida Shakira	(Singapore)	2 June 2007 (age 19)	(Singapore) Mattar Sailors	2024	2026
22	Beatrice Tan Li Bin	(Singapore)	29 June 1992 (age 34)	(Singapore) Tanjong Pagar United	2022	2026
23	Alysha Nasrina	(Singapore)	23 October 2007 (age 18)	(Singapore) Geylang International	2024	2026
Defender
4	Umairah Hamdan	(Singapore)	11 March 2002 (age 24)	(Singapore) South Avenue CSC	2022	2026
5	Irsalina Irwan	(Singapore)	1 January 2007 (age 19)	(Singapore) Mattar Sailors	2025	2026
8	Syazwani Ruzi	(Singapore)	6 March 2001 (age 25)	(Singapore) Still Aerion	2022	2026
16	Tyan Foong	(Singapore)	19 April 2009 (age 17)	(Singapore) Mattar Sailors	2024	2026
17	Khairunnisa Anwar	(Singapore)	21 February 2003 (age 23)	(Singapore) South Avenue CSC	2022	2026
27	Tia Foong Po Shiun	(Singapore)	31 July 2007 (age 19)	(Singapore) Mattar Sailors	2022	2026
33	Siti Nurerwadah Erwan	(Singapore)	26 June 2004 (age 22)	(Singapore) Geylang International	2025	2026
Midfielder
7	Dhaniyah Qasimah	(Singapore)	7 July 2004 (age 22)	(Singapore) Albirex Niigata (S)	2025	2026
18	Remi Ogawa	(Singapore) (Japan)		(Singapore) Mattar Sailors	2025	2026
24	Nurhidayu Naszri	(Singapore)	16 March 2004 (age 22)	(Singapore) JSSL Tampines	2024	2026
30	Wan Nashirah Mohammed	(Singapore)	4 August 2005 (age 21)	(Singapore) Geylang International	2025	2026
32	Nur Ain Salleh	(Singapore)	7 January 2010 (age 16)	(Spain) Madrid CFF Youth	2024	2026
48	Venetia Lim Ying Xuan	(Singapore)	14 October 2003 (age 22)	(Australia) Eltham Redbacks	2026	2026
Forwards
6	Eri Kitagawa	(Japan)	8 April 2004 (age 22)	(Japan) Omiya Ardija Ventus	2025	2026
9	Raeka Ee Pei Ying	(Singapore)	16 September 2003 (age 23)	(Singapore) Mattar Sailors	2023	2026
10	Farah Nurzahirah	(Singapore)	13 January 2004 (age 22)	(Singapore) Geylang International	2025	2026
11	Ami Takeuchi	(Japan)	6 December 2005 (age 20)	(Japan) Urawa Red Diamonds Ladies	2025	2026
19	Izzati Rosni	(Singapore)	24 May 1999 (age 27)	(Malaysia) Selangor FC	2026	2026
21	Priscille Le Helloco	(France)	8 January 2007 (age 19)	(United States) Rider University	2024	2026
28	Putri Alyiah Seow	(Malaysia)	19 March 2003 (age 23)	(Singapore) Mattar Sailors	2025	2026
Mid-season transferred players
20	Sarah Zu’risqha Zul’kepli	(Singapore)	24 July 2006 (age 20)	(Japan) Albirex Niigata (S)	2024	2026

=== Women squad (LCS 'B' Team) ===
Squad No.	Name	Nationality	Date of birth (age)	Previous club	Contract since	Contract end
Goalkeeper
Defender
99	Syahirah Issaka	(Singapore) Mattar Sailors	15 September 2010 (age 16)	(Singapore)	2025	2026
	Nur Auni Shellah	(Singapore)	3 January 2011 (age 15)	(Singapore) Mattar Sailors	2025	2026
Midfielder
59	Amelia Ng Jing Xuan	(Singapore)	16 August 2010 (age 16)	(Singapore) Lion City Sailors	2025	2026
60	Ami Kawase	(Japan)	4 October 2011 (age 15)	(Japan) Albirex Niigata U13	2026	2026
62	Indra Lewin Wei	(United States) (Canada)		(Europe) EuroAsia U14	2026	2026
88	Sofia Rusi	(Finland)	4 September 2012 (age 14)	Youth Team	2026	2026
	Ho Huixin	(Singapore)	23 April 1992 (age 34)	(Singapore) Lion City Sailors	2022	2026
	Amelia Tan Si Leng	(Singapore)	3 October 2011 (age 15)	(Singapore) Mattar Sailors	2025	2026
	Hani Raisha	(Singapore)	22 November 2011 (age 14)	(Singapore)	2026	2026
Striker
	Aria Romano	(Singapore)		Youth Team	2026	2026
Mid-season transferred players

=== Women squad (Mattar Sailors) ===
Squad No.	Name	Nationality	Date of birth (age)	Previous club	Contract since	Contract end
Goalkeeper
1	Jean	(Singapore)		(Singapore)	2026	2026
35	Julia Huss	(Singapore)		(Singapore) National Development Centre	2025	2026
18	Tamara Chang Ming-Wen	(Singapore)		(Singapore)	2025	2025
Defender
2	Hannah S	(Singapore)		(Singapore)	2026	2026
3	Daania Alodia Sukoor	(Singapore)		(Singapore) National Development Centre	2026	2026
4	Spandana	(Singapore)		(Singapore)	2026	2026
6	Rasyiqah Miza	(Singapore)	16 October 2010 (age 15)	(Singapore)	2025	2026
14	Isis Ang	(Singapore)		(Singapore)	2025	2026
15	Yu Ting	(Singapore)		(Singapore)	2026	2026
24	Clara Wong	(Singapore)		(Singapore) Royal Arion	2025	2026
4	Nadia Nuraffendi	(Singapore)		(Singapore) Lion City Sailors (W)	2023	2025
17	Carolyn Chan	(Singapore)		(Singapore)	2025	2025
21	Syaizta Ohorella	(Singapore)	10 February 2009 (age 17)	(Singapore)	2023	2025
22	Tasha Foong Po Yui	(Singapore)	27 May 2005 (age 21)	(Singapore) ITE College East	2022	2025
Midfielder
3	Lily	(Singapore)		(Singapore)	2026	2026
8	Joyce Foo	(Singapore)		(Singapore) Still Aerion	2025	2026
10	Tharshini Rajasegar	(Singapore)		(Singapore) Still Aerion	2025	2026
11	Jaen Lee	(Singapore)		(Singapore)	2023	2026
13	Katelyn Yeoh	(Singapore)		(Singapore)	2025	2026
17	Nala Marie	(United Arab Emirates)		(Singapore)	2026	2026
18	Clae Kho	(Singapore)		(Singapore) Hougang United	2026	2026
20	Nayli Elvira Sha'aril	(Singapore)	1 October 2009 (age 17)	(Singapore)	2025	2026
21	Rayhana Shanaz	(Singapore)		(Singapore) Tasek Sailors	2026	2026
30	Shiya	(Singapore)		(Singapore)	2026	2026
15	Natalie Ng	(Singapore)		(Singapore)	2025	2025
25	Nurhannah Qistina	(Singapore)		(Singapore) Still Aerion	2025	2025
39	Erina Oyama	(Japan)		(Singapore)	2025	2025
	Qhalisah Arysha	(Singapore)	22 November 2011 (age 14)	(Singapore)	2026	2026
Forward
5	Milan Kaur	(Singapore)		(Singapore)	2025	2026
7	Maxine Maribbay	(Singapore)	21 April 2005 (age 21)		2023	2026
9	Maite Jones	(Singapore)		(Singapore)	2025	2026
12	Risya Rizqyqa	(Singapore)	14 January 2011 (age 15)	(Singapore) National Development Centre	2026	2026
19	Hannah Tasha Abdullahsiraj	(Singapore)		(Singapore)	2025	2026
22	Trinity	(Singapore)		(Singapore)	2026	2026
47	Tara	(Singapore)		(Singapore)	2026	2026
95	Sri Ravi Sivashankar	(Singapore)		(Singapore)	2025	2025

== Staff ==
The following list displays the coaching and administrative staff of Lion City Sailors FC:

Management Team

Position	Name
Chairman	(Singapore) Forrest Li
Technical Director	(Serbia) Luka Lalić
Sporting Director	(Singapore) Badri Ghent
General Manager	(Singapore) Tan Li Yu

First Team

Position	Name
Team Manager (SPL)	(Vietnam) Hương Trần
Team Manager (WPL)	(Singapore) Jenny Tan
Head Women Program	(Singapore) Yeong Sheau Shyan
Head Coach	(Serbia) Aleksandar Ranković
Head Coach (Women)	(Indonesia) Muhammad Yusuf Chatyawan
Assistant Coach (Women)	(Singapore) Daniel Ong
Assistant Coach	(Serbia) Marko Perović (Serbia) Danilo Tesic
Goalkeeping Coach	(Slovenia) Matija Radikon
Goalkeeping Coach (Assistant)	(Singapore) Chua Lye Heng
Head Strength & Conditioning (S&C) Coach	(Bosnia and Herzegovina) Dzevad Saric
Rehabilitation Coach	(Netherlands) Niels Van Sundert
Sports Scientist	(Netherlands) Mike Kerklaan (Spain) David Conde
Video Analyst	(Spain) Varo Moreno
Match Analyst	(Singapore) Nigel Goh (Singapore) He Qi Xiang
Head of Logistics	(Singapore) Zahir Taufeek

U21 Team

Head Coach (Under-21)	(Singapore) Firdaus Kassim
Asst Coach (Under-21)	(Singapore) Tengku Mushadad
Goalkeeper Coach (Under-21)	(Singapore) Shahril Jantan
Performance Coach (Under-21)	(Germany) Lewin Kösterke
Individual Coach (Under-21)	(Portugal) Rodrigo Costa
Sports Scientist (Under-21)	(Netherlands) Wouter de Vroome
Match Analyst (Under-21)	(Singapore) Gautam Selvamany
Video Analyst (Under-21)	(Spain) Miguel García

Academy

Position	Name
Head of DC Team	(Singapore) Jasni Hatta
Under-17 Head Coach & Academy Coordinator	(Singapore) Ashraf Ariffin
Under-15 Head Coach	(Spain) Albert Arnau Roman
Under-14 Head Coach	(Portugal) Bruno Jeremias
Under-13 Head Coach	(Singapore) Khairil Asyraf
Under-12 Head Coach	(Singapore) Hamqaamal Shah
Under-11 Head Coach	(Portugal) Francisco Couto
Under-10 Head Coach	(Singapore) Kevin Tan
Head of Youth Goalkeeper Coach	(Singapore) Shahril Jantan
Goalkeeping Coach (U17)	(Estonia) Artur Lohmus
Goalkeeping Coach (U15)	(Singapore)
Goalkeeping Coach (U13)	(Singapore) Yeo Jun Guang
Performance Coach (U17)	(Singapore) Farij Samsudi
Performance Coach (U15)	(Brazil) Vital Ribeiro
Performance Coach (U13)	
Individual Coach (U17) & Talent Coordinator	(Portugal) Nuno Pereira
Individual Coach (U15)	(Portugal) Diogo Silva Costa
Individual Coach (U13)	(Portugal) Gonçalo Barbosa
S&C Coach (U17)	
S&C Coach (U15)	
S&C Coach (U13) & Video Analyst (U17)	(Singapore) Leslie Chen
Medical Coordinator	(Estonia) Tarmo Tikk
Sports Trainer	(Singapore) Amanda Cheong
Video Analyst (Development)	(Singapore) Raihan Ismail
Video Analyst (U17)	(Singapore) Zachary Wu
Video Analyst (U15)	(Singapore) Poh Kai Ern
Medical Logistics	(Singapore) Masrezal Bin Mashuri
Nutritionist	(Netherlands) Denise Van Ewijk
Administrative Manager	(Singapore) Clement Choong
Logistics Manager	(Malaysia) Jackson Goh
Multimedia Manager	(Singapore) Adrian Tan
International Relations	(Singapore) Calum Lim
Kitman	(Singapore) Uncle John

== Transfers ==
=== In ===
Pre-season

Date	Position	Player	Transferred from	Ref
First Team
20 January 2026	FW	(Singapore) Nur Izzati Rosni	(Malaysia) Selangor FC	Free
20 January 2026	MF	(Singapore) Venetia Lim	(Australia) Boroondara Eagles Women (A2)	Free
20 January 2026	FW	(Singapore) Nur Ain Salleh	(Spain) Madrid CFF Youth	Season loan
20 January 2026	DF	(France) Priscille Le Helloco	(United States) Rider University	Free
20 January 2026	MF	(Japan) Ami Kawase	(Japan) Albirex Niigata (S) U13	Free (Note: Registered for LCS 'B' team.)

=== Out ===
Preseason

Date	Position	Player	Transferred To	Ref
First Team
23 December 2025	DF	(Japan) Hikaru Shibusawa	(Japan) Fukuoka J. Anclas (J2)	Free
30 December 2025	MF	(Singapore) Dorcas Chu	Retired	N.A.
31 December 2025	GK	(Singapore) Nurul Haziqah Haszman	(Singapore) BG Tampines Rovers	Free
31 December 2025	GK	(Singapore) Hazel Lim	(Singapore) Still Aerion WFC	Free
31 December 2025	DF	(Singapore) Mira Ruzana	(Singapore)	Free
31 December 2025	DF	(China) Wang Jiaxin	(China)	Free
31 December 2025	MF	(China) Zhang Qiaoling	(China)	Free
31 December 2025	MF	(India) Anaya Sehgal	(Singapore)	Free
31 December 2025	MF	(India) Rivka Ramji	(India)	Free
31 December 2025	MF	(Singapore) Qarissa Putri Ramadhani	(Singapore)	Free
31 December 2025	FW	(Singapore) Nicole Lim	(Singapore) Still Aerion WFC	Free
Reserve Team

Mid-season

Date	Position	Player	Transferred To	Ref
First Team
20 April 2026	MF	(Singapore) Sarah Zu’risqha Zul’kepli	(Singapore) Geylang International	
Reserve Team

Post-season

Date	Position	Player	Transferred To	Ref
First Team
30 June 2026	FW	(Japan) Eri Kitagawa	(Japan) Nagano Parceiro	Free
Reserve Team

=== Loans In ===
Mid-Season

Position	Player	Transferred From	Team	Ref

== Friendlies ==
=== Pre-season friendlies ===
Win Draw Loss

== Team statistics ==
=== Appearances and goals (Women) ===
As of 20 February 26

No.	Pos.	Player	WPL		AFC Champions League		Total	
No.	Pos.	Player	Apps.	Goals	Apps.	Goals	Apps.	Goals
1	GK	(Singapore) Izairida Shakira	4	0	0	0	4	0
4	DF	(Singapore) Nur Umairah	0	0	0	0	0	0
5	DF	(Singapore) Irsalina Irwan	5	0	0	0	5	0
6	FW	(Japan) Eri Kitagawa	5	6	0	0	5	6
7	MF	(Singapore) Dhaniyah Qasimah	5	0	0	0	5	0
8	DF	(Singapore) Nur Syazwani Ruzi	4	0	0	0	4	0
9	FW	(Singapore) Raeka Ee Pei Ying	0+1	0	0	0	1	0
10	FW	(Singapore) Farah Nurzahirah	5	9	0	0	5	9
11	MF	(Japan) Ami Takeuchi	5	17	0	0	5	17
16	DF	(Singapore) Tyan Foong	1+1	0	0	0	2	0
17	DF	(Singapore) Khairunnisa Anwar	1+3	0	0	0	4	0
18	MF	(Japan) (Singapore) Remi Ogawa	0+2	0	0	0	2	0
19	FW	(Singapore) Izzati Rosni	0+5	3	0	0	5	3
20	MF	(Singapore) Sarah Zu’risqha Zul’kepli	1+3	0	0	0	4	0
21	FW	(France) Priscille Le Helloco	0+5	0	0	0	5	0
22	GK	(Singapore) Beatrice Tan	0	0	0	0	0	0
23	GK	(Singapore) Alysha Nasrina	1	0	0	0	1	0
24	MF	(Singapore) Nurhidayu Naszri	3+2	0	0	0	5	0
27	DF	(Singapore) Tia Foong Po Shiun	0+2	0	0	0	2	0
28	FW	(Malaysia) (Netherlands) Putri Alyiah Seow	0	0	0	0	0	0
30	MF	(Singapore) Wan Nashirah Mohammed	0	0	0	0	0	0
32	FW	(Singapore) Nur Ain Salleh	4	3	0	0	4	3
33	MF	(Singapore) Siti Nurerwadah Erwan	3+1	0	0	0	4	0
48	MF	(Singapore) Venetia Lim Ying Xuan	0	0	0	0	0	0
59	FW	(Singapore) Amelia Tan	3+1	2	0	0	4	2
60	FW	(Japan) Ami Kawase	5	5	0	0	5	5
62	FW	(United States) Indra Lewin Wei	0+4	0	0	0	4	0
Players who have played this season but had left the club or on loan to other club

=== Appearances and goals (Mattar Sailors) ===
As of 13 Oct 2023

No.	Pos.	Player	WNL	
No.	Pos.	Player	Apps.	Goals
1	GK	(Singapore) Chantale Lamasan Rosa	0	0
2	DF	(Singapore) Rayna Balqis	0	0
3	DF	(Singapore) Fatin Aqillah	0	0
5	DF	(Singapore) Lopez	0	0
6	DF	(Singapore) Putri Alyiah Seow	0	0
7	FW	(Singapore) Nor Adriana Lim	0	0
8	FW	(Singapore) Celine Koh	0	0
9	FW	(Singapore) Liyana Indah Rickit	0	0
10	MF	(Singapore) Verona Lim Ruo Ya	0	0
11	MF	(Singapore) Jaen Lee	0	0
12	MF	(Singapore) Amelia Ng Jing Xuan	0	0
15	FW	(Singapore) Maxine Maribbay	0	0
17	MF	(Singapore) Carol	0	0
19	DF	(Singapore) Tyan Foong	0	0
21	DF	(Singapore) Syaizta Ohorella	0	0
22	DF	(Singapore) Tasha Foong Po Yui	0	0
24	MF	(Singapore) Mayvin Chan	0	0
25	DF	(Singapore) Gerry	0	0
27	DF	(Singapore) Milan	0	0
?	FW	(Singapore) Katelyn Yeoh	0	0
?	GK	(Singapore) Talia Sachet	0	0
Players who have played this season but had left the club or on loan to other club

== Competition ==
2026 Women's Premier League is:

=== Women's Premier League ===
Win Draw Loss

25 January 2026 1	Balestier Khalsa (Singapore)	0–16	(Singapore) Lion City Sailors	Bukit Gombak
		Report	Eri Kitagawa 4', 82'; Ami Takeuchi 13', 17', 19', 43', 46', 62', 69', 76'; Farah Nurzahirah 21', 34', 47'; Ami Kawase 30', 38'; Izzati Rosni 90+2'	Stadium: Bukit Gombak Stadium

31 January 2026 2	Lion City Sailors (Singapore)	1–0	(Singapore) Still Aerion WFC	Choa Chu Kang
	Angelyn Pang 80' (o.g.)	Report		Stadium: Choa Chu Kang Stadium

7 February 2026 3	Tanjong Pagar United (Singapore)	0–12	(Singapore) Lion City Sailors	Choa Chu Kang
		Report	Nur Ain Salleh 9', 52'; Farah Nurzahirah 13', 45+1', 70'; Ami Takeuchi 34', 68', 79', 90+2'; Ami Kawase 36'; Denise Chu 55' (o.g.); Izzati Rosni 74'	Stadium: Choa Chu Kang Stadium

13 February 2026 4	Lion City Sailors (Singapore)	12–0	(Singapore) BG Tampines Rovers	Bukit Gombak
	Amelia Tan 4', 16'; Eri Kitagawa 9', 20', 36'; Farah Nurzahirah 17', 90'; Ami Takeuchi 28', 83'; Ami Kawase 38', 45'; Izzati Rosni 50'	Report		Stadium: Bukit Gombak Stadium

20 February 2026 5	Geylang International (Singapore)	0–6	(Singapore) Lion City Sailors	Choa Chu Kang
		Report	Ami Takeuchi 26', 72', 89'; Nur Ain Salleh 36'; Eri Kitagawa 49'; Farah Nurzahirah 71'	Stadium: Choa Chu Kang Stadium

13 March 2026 6	Lion City Sailors (Singapore)	0–2	(Singapore) Albirex Jurong	Bukit Gombak
				Stadium: Bukit Gombak Stadium

27 March 2026 7	Tiong Bahru (Singapore)	–	(Singapore) Lion City Sailors	Bukit Gombak
				Stadium: Bukit Gombak Stadium

4 April 2026 8	Lion City Sailors (Singapore)	–	(Singapore) Hougang United	Bukit Gombak
				Stadium: Bukit Gombak Stadium

21 April 2026 9	Lion City Sailors (Singapore)	–	(Singapore) Balestier Khalsa	Bukit Gombak
				Stadium: Bukit Gombak Stadium

25 April 2026 10	Still Aerion WFC (Singapore)	–	(Singapore) Lion City Sailors	Choa Chu Kang
				Stadium: Choa Chu Kang Stadium

2 May 2026 11	Lion City Sailors (Singapore)	–	(Singapore) Tanjong Pagar United	Choa Chu Kang
				Stadium: Choa Chu Kang Stadium

9 May 2026 12	BG Tampines Rovers (Singapore)	–	(Singapore) Lion City Sailors	Choa Chu Kang
				Stadium: Choa Chu Kang Stadium

15 May 2026 13	Lion City Sailors (Singapore)	–	(Singapore) Geylang International	Choa Chu Kang
				Stadium: Choa Chu Kang Stadium

12 June 2026 14	Albirex Jurong (Singapore)	–	(Singapore) Lion City Sailors	Choa Chu Kang
				Stadium: Choa Chu Kang Stadium

20 June 2026 15	Lion City Sailors (Singapore)	–	(Singapore) Tiong Bahru	Choa Chu Kang
				Stadium: Choa Chu Kang Stadium

27 June 2026 16	Hougang United (Singapore)	–	(Singapore) Lion City Sailors	Choa Chu Kang
				Stadium: Choa Chu Kang Stadium

League table

Pos	Team	Pld	W	D	L	GF	GA	GD	Pts	Qualification or relegation
1	Lion City Sailors (C)	16	15	0	1	166	4	+162	45	Qualification for AFC Champions League
2	Albirex Jurong	16	15	0	1	140	6	+134	45	
3	Still Aerion	16	11	1	4	52	27	+25	34	
4	Geylang International	16	10	1	5	44	28	+16	31	
5	BG Tampines Rovers	16	7	1	8	30	58	−28	22	
6	Tanjong Pagar United	16	3	3	10	8	75	−67	12	
7	Balestier Khalsa	16	4	0	12	19	107	−88	12	
8	Tiong Bahru (R)	16	1	2	13	16	64	−48	5	Play-off with WNL runners-up
9	Hougang United (R)	16	1	2	13	9	115	−106	5	Relegation to National League

Source: Women's Premier League
Rules for classification: 1) points; 2) goal difference; 3) number of goals scored; 4) number of wins
(C) League champions; (R) Relegated

== Competition - LCS 'B' (Women's National League) ==
Win Draw Loss

Round Robin

Pos	Team	Pld	W	D	L	GF	GA	GD	Pts	Remarks
1	Lion City Sailors 'B' (Note: WPL 'B' teams participating in the WNL will not be eligible for promotion to the WPL next season.) (C)	13	13	0	0	82	5	+77	39	Champions
2	Frenz GDT Circuit FC (P)	13	10	0	3	54	27	+27	30	Promotion to Premier League
3	Still Aerion 'B'	13	9	0	4	30	15	+15	27	
4	Unity FC (Note: Unity FC will be promoted after defeating Tiong Bahru in a penalty shootout on 5 July 2026.) (P, O)	13	6	1	6	24	19	+5	19	Play-off with WPL 8th place
5	Katong FC	13	4	3	6	13	38	−25	15	
6	Jungfrau Punggol FC	13	7	0	6	25	26	−1	21	Bottom Tier (Note: Teams in 6th to 10th position after first round form the Bottom Tier)
7	Mattar Sailors FC	13	4	1	8	19	22	−3	13	Bottom Tier
8	Kaki Bukit SC	13	4	0	9	26	54	−28	12	Bottom Tier
9	Eastern Thunder FC	13	3	1	9	19	28	−9	10	Bottom Tier
10	SFA Combined Girls	13	2	0	11	7	65	−58	6	Bottom Tier

Source: FAS
Rules for classification: 1) points; 2) goal difference; 3) number of goals scored; 4) number of wins
(C) Champions; (O) Play-off winners; (P) Promoted
Notes:

8 February 2026 1	Lion City Sailors B (Singapore)	3–1	(Singapore) Jungfrau Punggol	Choa Chu Kang
				Stadium: Regent Secondary School

15 February 2026 2	SFA Combined Girls (Singapore)	0–12	(Singapore) Lion City Sailors B	Choa Chu Kang
				Stadium: Choa Chu Kang Stadium

22 February 2026 3	Lion City Sailors B (Singapore)	–	(Singapore) Kaki Bukit SC	Mattar
				Stadium: LCS Training Center

7 March 2026 4	Lion City Sailors B (Singapore)	–	(Singapore) FRENZ GDT Circuit	Ayer Rajah
				Stadium: SRC Ayer Rajah Field

12 April 2026 6	Lion City Sailors B (Singapore)	–	(Singapore) Eastern Thunder	Ayer Rajah
				Stadium: SRC Ayer Rajah Field

3 May 2026 9	Lion City Sailors B (Singapore)	–	(Singapore) Mattar Sailors	Choa Chu Kang
				Stadium: Choa Chu Kang Stadium

== Competition - Mattar Sailors (Women's National League) ==
Win Draw Loss

Round Robin

Pos	Team	Pld	W	D	L	GF	GA	GD	Pts	Remarks
1	Lion City Sailors 'B' (Note: WPL 'B' teams participating in the WNL will not be eligible for promotion to the WPL next season.) (C)	13	13	0	0	82	5	+77	39	Champions
2	Frenz GDT Circuit FC (P)	13	10	0	3	54	27	+27	30	Promotion to Premier League
3	Still Aerion 'B'	13	9	0	4	30	15	+15	27	
4	Unity FC (Note: Unity FC will be promoted after defeating Tiong Bahru in a penalty shootout on 5 July 2026.) (P, O)	13	6	1	6	24	19	+5	19	Play-off with WPL 8th place
5	Katong FC	13	4	3	6	13	38	−25	15	
6	Jungfrau Punggol FC	13	7	0	6	25	26	−1	21	Bottom Tier (Note: Teams in 6th to 10th position after first round form the Bottom Tier)
7	Mattar Sailors FC	13	4	1	8	19	22	−3	13	Bottom Tier
8	Kaki Bukit SC	13	4	0	9	26	54	−28	12	Bottom Tier
9	Eastern Thunder FC	13	3	1	9	19	28	−9	10	Bottom Tier
10	SFA Combined Girls	13	2	0	11	7	65	−58	6	Bottom Tier

Source: FAS
Rules for classification: 1) points; 2) goal difference; 3) number of goals scored; 4) number of wins
(C) Champions; (O) Play-off winners; (P) Promoted
Notes:

8 February 2026 1	Unity FC (Singapore)	1–0	(Singapore) Mattar Sailors	Yishun
				Stadium: XCL World Academy

15 February 2026 2	Jungfrau Punggol (Singapore)	0–2	(Singapore) Mattar Sailors	Choa Chu Kang
			Hannah Tasha; Risya Rizqyqa	Stadium: Choa Chu Kang Stadium

22 February 2026 3	Mattar Sailors (Singapore)	6–0	(Singapore) SFA Combined	Choa Chu Kang
				Stadium: Choa Chu Kang Stadium

15 March 2026 4	Kaki Bukit SC (Singapore)	–	(Singapore) Mattar Sailors	Mattar
				Stadium: LCS Training Center

28 March 2026 5	Mattar Sailors (Singapore)	–	(Singapore) FRENZ GDT Circuit	Ayer Rajah
				Stadium: SRC Ayer Rajah Field

12 April 2026 6	Mattar Sailors (Singapore)	–	(Singapore) Katong FC	Choa Chu Kang
				Stadium: Choa Chu Kang Stadium

19 April 2026 7	Eastern Thunder (Singapore)	–	(Singapore) Mattar Sailors	Bukit Gombak
				Stadium: Bukit Gombak Stadium

26 April 2026 8	Mattar Sailors (Singapore)	–	(Singapore) Still Aerion B	Choa Chu Kang
				Stadium: Unity Secondary School

3 May 2026 9	Lion City Sailors B (Singapore)	–	(Singapore) Mattar Sailors	Choa Chu Kang
				Stadium: Choa Chu Kang Stadium
