= Machida Station =

Machida Station is the name of a train station in Machida, Tokyo, Japan, and an abandoned train station in Kokonoe, Oita:

- Machida Station (Tokyo) - on the Odakyu Odawara Line and the JR Yokohama Line
- Machida Station (Oita) - on the former Miyanoharu Line
