= Bukit Gombak Stadium =

Stadium in Bukit Gombak, Singapore

Coordinates: 1°21′29.71″N 103°45′12.67″E

- Interactive map of Bukit Gombak Stadium
- Full name: Bukit Gombak Stadium
- Address: 800 Bukit Batok West Ave 5, Singapore 659081
- Location: Bukit Gombak, Singapore
- Owner: Sport Singapore
- Operator: Sport Singapore
- Capacity: 3,000
- Surface: Grass
- Public transit: NS3 Bukit Gombak

Tenants
- Jurong Town (1997–2003); Gombak United (1998–2002, 2006–2012)

The Bukit Gombak Stadium is located in Bukit Gombak, Singapore, and has a capacity of 3,000 people. Bukit Gombak Stadium is mostly used for football matches and its operated by Sport Singapore. It is located next to the Bukit Gombak MRT station.

== History ==
Bukit Gombak Stadium was home to football club, Gombak United in the S.League before they left the league in the year of 2002. Thereafter, the stadium was converted to a Centre of Excellence for the Singapore Athletic Association.

In October 2019, Senegal national football team consisted of world class players such as Sadio Mané, Kalidou Koulibaly, Ismaïla Sarr, Cheikhou Kouyaté and Keita Baldé was also involved as Senegal use the Bukit Gombak Stadium as its training base.

In May 2025, Emirati club Sharjah FC use the Bukit Gombak Stadium as its training base in preparation for the upcoming AFC Champions League Two final.

== Facilities and Structures ==
Bukit Gombak Stadium houses a grass football pitch, an 8-lane running track and partial athletic facilities. People can be seen running around the track daily as Sport Singapore allows joggers to use the track facilities between 4:30am to 9:30pm for free.

== Transport ==
Bukit Gombak Sport Centre is located beside the Bukit Gombak MRT, and next to Little Guilin Park. The SRC has built a steady take up rate for her Learn-to-Play programmes and for the use of the stadium and gym.

== International fixtures ==
Women's football
Date	Competition	Team	Score	Team
25 November 2025	Friendly	Singapore	9–0	Seychelles
28 November 2025	Friendly	Singapore	7–0	Seychelles
