= R. Vengadasalam =

Singaporean football official

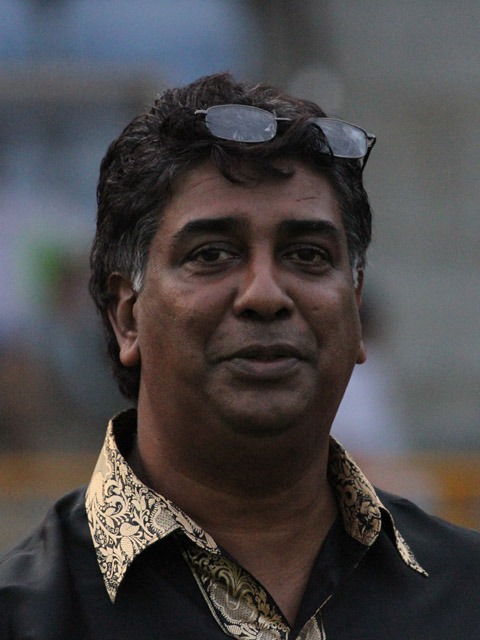
- Vengadasalam in 2012

Personal information
- Full name: Rengayyan Vengadasalam
- Date of birth: 2 August 1960 (age 66)
- Place of birth: Singapore

Managerial career
- Years: Team
- 1988–1995: Wellington FC
- 1996–2004: Woodlands Wellington
- 2004–2010: Tampines Rovers
- 2012: Admiralty FC
- 2016: Gymkhana FC

R. Vengadasalam (born 2 August 1960), commonly known as Venga, is a Singaporean football official who is the founder and president of Woodlands Lions FC, a youth-developmental football club with its senior team taking part in Singapore Island Wide League and an Ordinary member of the FAS, since the club's inception in 2018.

A veteran in the Singapore football scene, Venga is mostly remembered for his time as an official in the S.League (now known as the Singapore Premier League) between 1996 and 2010, managing Woodlands Wellington between 1996 and 2004, and Tampines Rovers between 2004 and 2010.

When he was the team manager of Gymkhana FC in the National Football League in 2016, Venga made headlines for attempting to assemble a team to contest in the watershed FAS elections before making a dramatic turn and switching to campaign for the team of incumbents led by Lim Kia Tong during the lead-up to election day, where the elections were eventually won by Lim and his team, which consisted of heavyweights such as Teo Hock Seng and S. Thavaneson. Following the elections, Venga was appointed as the Director of Football of Eunos Crescent FC in 2017. He left the club at the end of the 2017 season and founded Woodlands Lions FC in the subsequent year.

Venga was honoured along with five Singapore Premier League club officials for their contributions to Singapore football during the FAS Awards Night on 7 December 2020 following the conclusion of the 2020 Singapore Premier League season.

== Career ==
=== Delhi Juniors Athletic Association ===
Prior to his involvement in football, Venga was a horticultural officer for the Housing and Development Board. He came to prominence in the football fraternity when he made headlines as the team manager and club secretary of Delhi Juniors Athletic Association, an amateur football club, in 1988.

Venga was banned by Football Association of Singapore for three years for "bringing the game into disrepute" when he filled in an All-England line-up on the team-sheet for his club during a Sembawang SC Islandwide League match between Delhi Juniors and Si Ling United. According to a news article, the referee had called off the match as there were insufficient players from both sides. This was because some players expected the match to be abandoned due to a heavy downpour and did not turn up, which prompted Venga to disregard the submission of the team sheet as he was told to only produce it during the interval. The lineup of Delhi Juniors, which had been discarded in the dressing room, was recovered by officials from Sembawang SC and used in the subsequent disciplinary hearing, which led to Venga's suspension.

=== Wellington Football Club ===
Vengadasalam founded Wellington Football Club in 1988, a splinter group of the Delhi Juniors and a team of Singaporean football enthusiasts that were among the pioneers of football in Singapore. The team's name was chosen due to the fact that they were being based in the Deptford Ground located on Wellington Road in Sembawang.

Wellington FC became a revelation in local football shortly after it was founded. In 1991, they participated in the Sembawang Group League and National Island-Wide League, winning as champions in both competitions and setting a national record by beating Seletar Football Club with a resounding 28 – 1 victory at the Woodlands Stadium on 17 November 1991.

The following year, Wellington FC joined the National Football League and were placed in Division II, from which they were promoted as champions in 1994. 1995 saw success, as they finished first in Division I (going unbeaten for 24 matches) and were runners-up in the FA Cup.

=== Woodlands Wellington ===
The convincing displays of Wellington Football Club led to their selection as one of eight clubs to compete in the newly formed S.League in its maiden season in 1996, prompting the club to adopt Woodlands Stadium as their home ground and to change their name to Woodlands Wellington Football Club.

During his time at Woodlands, Venga was affectionately known as the "Mouth of the North" as he had a knack for making quirky and colourful comments about his opponents. One of his most famous remarks was made before a match in 1996 against Tiong Bahru FC, in which he said that "TB (the abbreviated form of Tiong Bahru) is a disease (referring to tuberculosis), today we will cure it." His snark remarks added much colour to the S.League in its early years and often led to amusing exchanges with opposing coaches and managers, generating much-needed publicity for a league still very much in its infancy.

Venga's influence on Woodlands was substantial, as his negotiations allowed the Woodlands Wellington FC to draw in Bandai (Hong Kong) Company Limited as a sponsor in their maiden season in the S.League to the tune of $360,000. Venga shrewdly utilised the funds to sign on players such as Jan Janostak, Joe Caleta and Ervin Boban, all big name players in the M-League, as well as to secure the services of Singapore national players Borhan Abu Samah, Tamil Marren, Zakaria Awang and the flamboyant Croatian goalkeeper Sandro Radun, who played for the Singapore FA in 1992. The move proved to be a success as Woodlands Wellington managed to garner close to full house attendances for every match, including their pre-season friendlies.

His entertaining comments led the editors of Kick Off!, a local football weekly that covered mostly S.League news, to give him a spot in the magazine which was named "The Public Diary of Vengaman". It contained mostly fictional stories that parodied real life happenings in the S.League.

Venga made the headlines in March 2002 for reasons other than his controversial statements when a drunk fan leapt over a barrier and punched him after the final whistle was blown during the famed "Northern Derby" between Woodlands Wellington and Sembawang Rangers.

In September 2002, Venga was moved to the Woodlands executive committee by Woodlands chairman Tang Weng Fei while coach M. Karathu was asked to take over full charge of the team. He was given the post of general manager and his administrative duties kept him away from the touchline.

He remained in the team for the next one and a half years as the general manager until he decided to resign from his post on 12 May 2004 to join Tampines Rovers as their Director of Operations, causing a huge furore in the local football fraternity. He cited his reasons for leaving as a good chance for him to contribute to football and its development in Singapore, and that he had not been directly involved in football matters over the last two years and this was the area which he would like to be in.

During his time at Woodlands, Venga helped them to achieve 2nd position in the Tiger Beer series of the 1996 S.League, as well as 3rd place during the 1997 S.League season.

=== Tampines Rovers ===
Following his switch over to Tampines Rovers, the club won consecutive S.League titles in the 2004 and 2005 seasons. They were also crowned Singapore Cup champions consecutively in 2004, 2005 and 2006 and also became the ASEAN Football Federation club champions in 2005.

Venga was embroiled in a court case in December 2006 when he was accused of assaulting two patrons at his pub in Lucky Plaza in July 2006 but the case was later compounded in March 2007 and he was given a discharge amounting to an acquittal.

In line with his colourful character, Venga also made a dare to shave his head if the East Team, which he managed and consists of S.League stars which played in eastern based clubs, lost to the West Team in an all-star game preceding the 2006 S.League season.

=== Break from football ===
In late 2010, Venga left Tampines Rovers to take a break away from matters on the pitch. He became a football pundit from 2010 throughout 2011, until he was approached by Admiralty FC to become their team manager in early 2012.

=== Admiralty Football Club ===
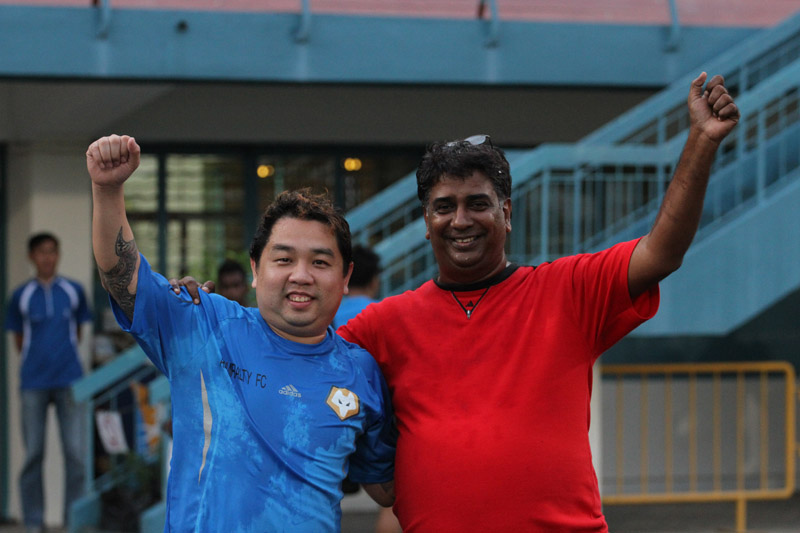
Admiralty FC team manager, R. Vengadasalam, and club owner, Donahue Francis, celebrate winning the Wolves' NFL Division 2 title on 30 June 2012.

In February 2012. Venga was appointed as the team manager of Admiralty Football Club, a team currently plying their trade in the NFL Division 2. With plans to take part in the domestic cup competitions in 2012, as well as to push for a bid to include Admiralty FC in the 2013 S.League, Venga decided to revamp the club's image by choosing the wolf as a mascot for the club.

Due to Venga's influential presence, several other notable players such as Tan Sio Beng, Azhar Baksin and Shariff Abdul Samat also signed up with the squad prior to their 2012 NFL campaign.

Venga was joined shortly after by veteran midfielder Mohd Noor Ali, who was hired as Admiralty's player-coach, and he made the move to snap up ex-Étoile FC players Andrea Damiani and Nordine Talhi when Étoile FC announced that they were not taking part in the 2012 S.League season to concentrate on youth development.

His presence also allowed Admiralty FC to attract sponsors such as Dester Premium Lager Beer and Asia Group.

As of 25 May 2012, Admiralty FC have enjoyed an unbeaten start of their NFL Division 2 season, a phenomenal record for the Wolves.

Admiralty FC also trounced Pioneer CSC with a 10 – 0 scoreline in June 2012, making huge waves in the NFL with their impressive performances.

On 30 June 2012, Admiralty FC were crowned champions of the NFL Division 2 2012 season when they beat Jollilads Arsenal FC by a 5–1 scoreline. The victory was the 12th consecutive win for the Wolves.
