= Sharif (surname) =

Sharif is a surname. Notable people with the surname include:

== A ==
- Aamna Sharif (born 1982), Indian actress
- Abbas Sharif (1953–2013), Pakistani politician and missionary
- Abdallah Sharif (born 1985), Libyan footballer
- Abdul Latif Sharif (1947–2006), Mexican chemist
- Abdullah El Sharif (born 1978), Egyptian poet
- Abdi Sharif (born 2001), Somali footballer
- Afzal Sharif, Bangladeshi television and film actor
- Ahmed Sharif (1921–1999), Bangladeshi atheist philosopher, critic and writer
- Ahmed Sharif (Bangladeshi actor), actor in more than 800 Bengali films
- Ahmed Sharif (Maldivian actor) (born 1991)
- Anamul Haque Sharif (born 1985), Bangladeshi footballer
- Arshad Sharif (1973–2022), Pakistani journalist, writer and news anchor

== B ==
- Babra Sharif (born 1954), Pakistani film actress
- Bassam Abu Sharif (born 1946), Palestine Liberation Organization member
- Bina Sharif, American playwright and actress

== C ==
- Chaudhry Muhammad Sharif (1928–2009), Pakistani judge
- Chiya Hamid Sharif (born 1975), Kurdish politician

== F ==
- Farhang Sharif (1931–2016), Iranian musician
- Fatah Sharif (died 2024), Palestinian educator
- Fatemeh Sharif (born 1986), Iranian futsal player and coach

== H ==
- Haroon Sharif (born 1965), Pakistani economist
- Hassan Sharif (1951–2016), Emirati artist and writer
- Hussain Sharif (born 1961), Emirati artist

== I ==
- Ibrahim Sharif (born 1957), political activist in Bahrain
- Ibrahim Sharif of Tunis (1640–1705), Bey of Tunis from 1702 to 1705
- Ismail Ibn Sharif (c. 1645–1727), Sultan of Morocco
- Ismail Mohammed Sharif (born 1962), Iraqi footballer

== J ==
- Jafar Sharif-Emami (1912–1998), Iranian politician
- Jairus Sharif, Canadian experimental jazz musician
- Jamal Al Sharif (born 1954), Syrian football referee
- Jafar Abdollahi-Sharif (born 1963), President of Urmia University of Technology
- Jawad Sharif, Pakistani filmmaker, producer, and activist
- Jeyran Sharif, Iranian actress
- Jihad Sharif (born 1968), Jordanian wrestler

== K ==
- Kadhem Sharif, Iraqi wrestler and weightlifter
- Kairat Lama Sharif (born 1962), Kazakhstan diplomat
- Khalil Sharif (born 1984), Qatari footballer
- Khawaja Muhammad Sharif (1949–2018), Pakistani judge
- Khvajeh Mohammad-Sharif (died 1576), Persian statesman
- Kul Sharif (died 1552), poet, statesman, academic, and imam of the Khanate of Kazan

== M ==
- Mahjoub Sharif (1948–2014), Sudanese poet, teacher and activist
- Maimunah Mohd Sharif (born 1961), Malaysian Mayor of Kuala Lumpur
- Majid Sharif (1951–1998), Iranian translator and journalist
- Majid Sharif-Vaghefi (1949–1975), Iranian dissident
- Mehrshad Sharif (born 1952), Iranian and French chess master
- M. M. Sharif (1965–1893), Pakistani philosopher, Islamic scholar and academic
- Mian Mohammed Sharif (1917–1997), Pakistani mathematician and administrator
- Mian Muhammad Sharif (1919–2004), Pakistani businessman
- Mohamed Sharif (born 1988), Somalian footballer
- Mohamed Raus Sharif (born 1951), Malaysian lawyer and judge
- Mohammed Sharif, Indian social worker
- Mohammad Sharif (cricketer) (born 1985), Bangladeshi cricketer
- Mohammed Sharif (detainee), Afghan citizen in extrajudicial detention at Guantanamo Bay Naval Base
- Mohammad Sharif (United Nations) (born 1933), head of the centre for Social Development and Humanitarian Affairs at the United Nations
- Mohiyedine Sharif (died 1998), bombmaker for Hamas
- Muhammad Sharif (1919–2008), Pakistani industrialist, father of Nawaz Sharif
- Muhammad Sharif (cosmologist) (born 1962), Pakistani physicist
- Muhammad Sharif (Kalifa) (died 1899), one of the lieutenants of Muhammad Ahmad (1844–1885)
- Muhammad ibn Sharif (died 1664), ruler of Tafilalt, Morocco

== N ==
- Nawaz Sharif (born 1949), Prime Minister of Pakistan
- Nazley Sharif (born 1990), South African politician

== O ==
- Omar Sharif (1932–2015), Egyptian film actor
- Omar Sharif Jr. (born 1983), Canadian actor, author and gay activist
- Othman Masoud Sharif, Tanzanian lawyer and politician

== R ==
- Raheel Sharif (born 1956), Pakistani general

== S ==
- Safyaan Sharif (born 1991), Scottish cricketer
- Sahira Sharif, Afghan politician
- Salim Sharif (born 1966), Malaysian politician
- Shabbir Sharif (1943–1971), Pakistani military officer
- Shafik Fauzan Sharif, Malaysian politician
- Shafiq Sharif (born 1990), Malaysian cricketer
- Shamil Sharif (born 1992), Singaporean footballer
- Shehbaz Sharif (born 1951), Pakistani politician and businessman
- Shimon Sharif (born 1978), Indian sports shooter
- Shishunala Sharif (1819–1889), Indian social reformer, philosopher, and poet
- Solmaz Sharif (born 1983), Iranian-American poet

== T ==
- Tahirah Sharif, British actress
- Tauqir Sharif (born 1988), English aid worker
- Tipu Sharif, Pakistani actor and singer-songwriter

== Y ==
- Yaqub Ali Sharif, Bangladeshi physician and politician

== Z ==
- Zahid Sharif (born 1967), Pakistani field hockey player
- Zoheb Sharif (born 1983), English cricketer

== See also ==
- Shariff
- Al-Sharif
- Shareef (surname)
