= Sherif (disambiguation) =

Sherif is a given name and surname.

Sherif may also refer to:

- Sherif (choreographer) (born 1981), Indian choreographer

== See also ==
- Sharif, title of descendants of Muhammad
- Sharif (disambiguation)
- Sheriff, government official
- Sheriff (disambiguation)
