= Sheriff (disambiguation) =

Sheriff is a political or legal office, varying greatly between countries.

Sheriff may also refer to:

== People ==
=== Surname ===
- Sheriff (surname)

=== Nickname ===
- Eli Cohen (footballer, born 1951), Israeli soccer player and manager nicknamed "The Sheriff"
- Del Gainer (1886–1947), American Major League Baseball player nicknamed "Sheriff"
- Peyton Manning (born 1976), American retired National Football League player nicknamed "The Sheriff"
- Ken Owens (born 1987), Welsh rugby player nicknamed "The Sheriff"

== Arts and entertainment ==
=== Film and TV ===
- The Sheriff (1918 film), a film starring Fatty Arbuckle
- The Sheriff (1959 film), an Italian Western comedy film
- Sheriff: Narko Integriti, a 2024 Malaysian crime film
- Sheriff (Cars), a character from the Cars franchise

=== Music ===
- Sheriff (band), a Canadian rock band from the early 1980s
  - Sheriff (album)
- The Sheriff (album), an album by Modern Jazz Quartet
- "The Sheriff", a track on the 1972 album Trilogy by Emerson, Lake & Palmer

=== Video games ===
- Sheriff (video game), an arcade game by Nintendo in 1979

== Other uses ==
- Sheriff Mountain, Montana, United States
- Sheriff (company), a Transnistrian (Moldovan) conglomerate
- *FC Sheriff Tiraspol, a Moldovan football club founded by the company
- Sheriff (weapon), a crowd-control vehicle of the U.S. military

== See also ==
- Sharif (disambiguation)
- Sherif, given name and surname
- Sherriff, surname
