= Shareef =

Shareef may refer to:

- Shareef (given name), an Arabic male given name
- Shareef (surname), an Arabic surname

== See also ==
- Sharif, title for descendants of Muhammad
- Sharif (disambiguation)
