= Al-Sharif =

Al-Sharif is a surname. Notable people with the surname include:

- Anas Al-Sharif (1996–2025), Palestinian journalist and videographer
- Danya Al-Sharif (born 2000), Saudi footballer
- Manal al-Sharif (born 1979), Saudi women's rights activist
- Manar al-Sharif (born 1997/1998), Syrian-Palestinian journalist and peace activist
- Mohammed Al-Sharif (born 1983), Libyan futsal goalkeeper
- Noha Al-Sharif (born 1980), Saudi Arabian sculptor
- Sayyed Imam Al-Sharif (born 1950), jihadist figure
- Talal al-Sharif, Jordanian politician

== See also ==
- Fatimah el-Sharif (1911–2009), Queen of Libya
- Sharif (surname)
