= Sheriff (surname) =

Sheriff, Shériff, or Sheriffe is a surname, and may refer to:

Sheriff

- A. Sheriff (1940–2015), Indian film scriptwriter and director
- Abdul Sheriff, Tanzanian historian
- Alexander Clunes Sheriff (1816–1878), English businessman and Member of Parliament for Worcester 1865–78
- Alhaji A. B. Sheriff, Sierra Leonean politician
- Ali Modu Sheriff (born 1956), Nigerian politician
- Andrew Sheriff (born 1957), British canoe sprinter
- Antony Sheriff (born 1963), businessman
- Dermot Sheriff (1920–1993), Irish basketball player
- Ella Milch-Sheriff, Israeli composer
- Eoin Sheriff (born 1988), Irish rugby union footballer
- Estrella López Sheriff (born 1992), Spanish judoka
- Frank Sheriff (born 1957), American abstract sculptor
- Master Haja Sheriff (born 1969), Indian actor and program organiser
- Hilla Sheriff (1903–1988), American physician
- Jamie Sheriff (born 2000), American football player
- John Sheriff (1816–1844), Scottish artist
- Justin Sheriff (born 1979), Irish field hockey player
- Ka. Mu. Sheriff, Tamil language writer and poet
- Karen Sheriff (born 1958), Canadian business executive
- Lawrence Sheriff (c.1516–1567), English merchant and benefactor
- Louis Sheriff (born 1992), English rugby league footballer
- Mary Sheriff (1950–2016), American art historian
- Moodeen Sheriff (died 1891), Indian surgeon and practitioner of herbal medicine
- Noam Sheriff (1935–2018), Israeli conductor, composer and arranger
- Paddy Sheriff (1926–1990), Irish basketball player
- Paul Sheriff (1903–1960), British art director
- Ramil Sheriff (born 1993), British footballer
- Rezvi Sheriff, Sri Lankan academic, nephrologist and physician
- Robert E. Sheriff (1922–2014), American geophysicist
- S. M. Muhammed Sheriff (1924–1981), Indian politician, academic and lawyer
- Salia Jusu-Sheriff (1929–2009), Sierra Leonean politician
- Satta Sheriff, Liberian human rights activist
- Stan Sheriff (1932–1993), American football player and coach, and college athletics administrator
- Tayler Sheriff, American baseball coach
- Yasmin Jusu-Sheriff, Sierra Leonean lawyer and activist

Shériff

- Laetitia Shériff, French rock musician

Sheriffe

- Edmund Sheriffe, English priest and academic in the 15th century
- Rikki Sheriffe (born 1984), English rugby league footballer

== See also ==
- Sherriff
- Shareef (surname)
- Sharief
- Sharif (disambiguation)
