= Şerif =

Şerif, also spelt Šerif in the Balkans, is a Turkish masculine given name, based on the Arabic name Sharif. Notable people with the name include:

== Given name ==
- Šerif Berbić (born 2001), Swiss footballer
- Şerif Bey Khimshiashvili (died 1892), Georgian nobleman in Ottoman and later Russian service
- Şerif Erol (born 1963), Turkish actor and screenwriter
- Şerif Gören (1944–2024), Turkish film director
- Šerif Hasić (born 1988), Bosnian footballer
- Şerif İlden (1877–1952), Turkish politician, army officer and diplomat
- Šerif Konjević (born 1958), Bosnian folk singer
- Şerif Mardin (1927–2017), Turkish social scientist
- Şerif Pasha (1865–1951), Kurdish nationalist
- Şerif Sezer (born 1946), Turkish actress
- Şerif Muhiddin Targan (1892–1967), Turkish musician
- Şerif Turgut, Turkish journalist and first female war correspondent
- Şerif Yaçağaz (1876–1938), Turkish bureaucrat, army officer and antisemitic politician
- Şerif Yenen (born 1963), Turkish traveloguer

=== Middle name ===
- Ekrem Şerif Uçak (1934–2012), Turkish actor
- Halil Şerif Pasha (1831–1879), Ottoman-Egyptian diplomat and art collector
- Mehmet Şerif Fırat (died 1949), Kurdish author
- Mehmet Şerif Pasha (1771–1851), Ottoman statesman and bureaucrat
- Muzaffer Şerif Başoğlu (1906–1988), Turkish-American psychologist

== Surname ==
- Aşık Mahzuni Şerif (1939–2002), Turkish folk musician

== See also ==
- Sherif, given name and surname
