= Shariff =

Shariff is a given name and a surname. Notable people with the name include:

== Given name ==
- Shariff Abdul Samat (1984–2020), Singaporean footballer
- Shariff Enamul Kabir, Bangladeshi academic
- Shariff Mohammed Ahmed (born 1954/55), Indian politician

== Surname ==
- Abubakar Shariff-Farr, English singer known as Bakar
- Aminu Shariff (born 1977), Nigerian filmmaker
- Ashrin Shariff (born 1982), Singaporean footballer
- Mo Shariff (born 1993), English footballer
- Muhammed Sharif (disambiguation)
- Noorel Shariff, Tanzanian tennis player
- Nor Aini Shariff, Malaysian fashion designer
- Shiraz Shariff (born 1954), Canadian politician
- Vempalli Shariff (born 1980), Indian Sheikh
- Yasmin Shariff (born 1956), British architect
- Yeop Mahidin Mohamed Shariff (1918–1999), Malaysian army director

== See also ==
- Sharif (disambiguation)
