= Sharifian =

Sharifian is a descriptor for things related to sharif, a term used to designate persons (often royal families) who claim descent from the Islamic prophet Muhammad, and may refer to:

- Farzad Sharifian (1964–2020), pioneer in cultural linguistics
- Sharifian Army, military force during the first World War used in the Arab Revolt against the Ottomans
- Sharifian Caliphate, Arab caliphate proclaimed by the Sharifian rulers of the Hejaz in 1924
- Sharifian Order of Military Merit, Moroccan military award used between 1966 and 1976
- Sharifian Solution, plan put forward by T. E. Lawrence in 1918 to install the sons of the charif of Mecca as heads of state in newly created countries across the Middle East

== See also ==
- Sharif (disambiguation)
- Sharifate of Mecca
- Sharifism
