= Admiralty FC =

Singaporean football club

- Full name: Admiralty Football Club
- Nickname: The Wolves
- Founded: 1987; 39 years ago
- President: Fauzie Mihram
- League: Island Wide League
- 2025: 3rd (Group C)
- Website: https://easternthunderfc.com/
Home colours	Away colours

Admiralty Football Club, also commonly known as Admiralty FC, is a football club which plays in the lower tiers of the Singapore Football League.

The club was registered in the name Admiralty Football Club in 1988. The club officially changed their name to Eastern Thunder FC with effect from 22 January 2024.

The men's team is currently participating in the Island Wide League, while their women's team is playing in the Women's National League.

== History ==
=== Admiralty FC ===
Admiralty FC's roots can be traced back to the humble surroundings of Sembawang Estate, where four brothers shared a common passion for football and a vision to create a club that would represent their community. The club was founded through the dedication and hard work of Mr Abdul Razak Bin Abu Bakar, Mr Abdul Rahim Bin Abu Bakar, Mr Abdul Rahman Bin Abu Bakar, and Mr Abdul Wahid Bin Abu Bakar. In its earliest days, the team was known as Basong Rangers. The club began as a community football team, bringing together talented players from the surrounding neighbourhoods of Sembawang. As the team grew in strength and reputation, the founders sought to formally register the club with the Football Association of Singapore (FAS). The registration process was not an easy one. Mr Abdul Wahid and Mr Abdul Razak made numerous trips to the Football Association of Singapore, working tirelessly to secure official recognition for the club. After several discussions and registration attempts, they were advised to change the club's name. Following FAS recommendations, the club was eventually registered under the name Admiralty FC, a name that would later become well known in Singapore's football community. The original Admiralty FC club crest was designed by Mr Abdul Wahid Bin Abu Bakar himself. The logo represented the club's identity, determination, and ambition to establish itself among Singapore's respected football clubs. What began as a small community team gradually developed into a competitive football club with a growing reputation. During its years competing in the Island Wide League, Admiralty FC enjoyed significant success under the leadership of Coach Mr Ansari, affectionately known throughout the football fraternity as Wak Ansari. The late Wak Ansari was a highly respected and disciplined football trainer whose no-nonsense approach, strong leadership, and commitment to player development helped shape the team's character and success. Under his guidance, Admiralty FC became widely recognized as one of the strongest and most feared teams in the Island Wide League. Opponents knew they would face a disciplined, hardworking, and highly competitive side whenever they came up against Admiralty FC. The club's performances earned respect across the local football scene and attracted many talented players who wanted to be part of the team's success. The club was proudly sponsored by Topper, whose support helped provide equipment, resources, and recognition during an important period of the club's development. With strong leadership both on and off the field, Admiralty FC continued to grow and establish its presence within Singapore football. As the years passed, the four founding brothers held discussions regarding the future direction and management of the club. After careful consideration, they collectively agreed to entrust the overall responsibility of Admiralty FC to Mr Abdul Wahid Bin Abu Bakar, who assumed the role of President of the Club. His leadership ensured continuity of the values and vision upon which the club had been built since its Basong Rangers days. As President, Mr Abdul Wahid worked closely alongside Mr William, who played an important role in supporting the club's operations and future development. Their partnership contributed significantly to maintaining the club's stability and progress. After several years of collaboration and dedication to the club's growth, Mr William eventually assumed ownership responsibilities, becoming the new owner of Admiralty FC Alongside Mr Venga. Today, the story of Admiralty FC stands as a testament to the vision, sacrifice, and perseverance of its founders. From a community-based team known as Basong Rangers in Sembawang Estate to a respected football club competing within Singapore's football structure, Admiralty FC's history reflects the passion of the people who built it and the legacy they left for future generations.

When Admiralty FC started in 1987 as a participant in the Sembawang Group League, a mini-league organized by the Football Association of Singapore which involved amateur clubs based in the Sembawang area in the 1980s. During its time in the Sembawang Group League, Admiralty FC often played against Delhi Juniors, which was the original name of Woodlands Wellington before it changed its name to Wellington FC in 1998.

In 1989, Admiralty finished as one of the top two teams in the Island Wide League (IWL) and was set to be promoted to the Division 2 of the National Football League (NFL). The promotion was challenged by Gillman FC who seek to nullify a match between Admiralty and Shelford United, which Admiralty won 5–0. FAS rejected the challenge and the club was successfully promoted to the SFL.

With only two years of participation, Admiralty was made an official football club in 1989 to compete in the SFL and it played the majority of its home games at the Yio Chu Kang stadium. Nasiruddin Sawardi and Fahmie Abdullah were two other ex-Singapore internationals who featured for Admiralty in the early nineties.

Admiralty came under the limelight in February 2012 when its management announced the appointment of former Woodlands Wellington team manager and Tampines Rovers Director of Operations R. Vengadasalam as their team manager. It also made waves in the local footballing fraternity when it announced that it was interested in joining the S.League in 2013. That season, with a 14 point leadue in NFL Division Two with only three games to play, Admiralty applied to withdraw from the league, but were persuaded not to.

Following the arrival of Venga, Admiralty swooped for veteran midfielder and ex-Singapore international Mohd Noor Ali to become the team's player-coach. In preparation for the 2012 NFL Division 2 season, Venga also orchestrated the moves for several well-known former S.League players such as Azhar Baksin, Tan Sio Beng and Shariff Abdul Samat, as well as Jean-Charles Blanpin and Nordine Talhi from Etoile FC following the Stars' decision to pull out from the 2012 S.League.

On 30 June 2012, Admiralty were crowned champions of the 2022 NFL Division 2 when they beat Jollilads Arsenal FC by a 5–1 scoreline. The victory was also the 12th consecutive win for the Wolves, preserving an unbeaten run for the club since the start of the season.

Admiralty made history by becoming the first NFL club to qualify for the League Cup after beating Singapore Recreation Club 3-1 in the League Cup Playoff Final on 12 May 2013.

In 2019, the club was relegated from NFL Division 2 to IWL after finishing 3rd in the bottom tier (11th overall). However, they did not participate in the 2022 IWL when the league returned after the coronavirus pandemic.

=== Eastern Thunder FC ===
Eastern Thunder FC announced their participation in the 2023 Women's National League (Singapore) under Admiralty FC. Led by former S-League goalkeeper Amos Boon, they finished 2nd in the group stage and eventually won 5-1 in the third-placing match against Ayer Rajah Gryphons in their debut season.

The club officially changed their name to Eastern Thunder FC with effect from 22 January 2024. The club returned to Island Wide League under the new name for the 2024 season. They topped their group and reached the Semi-finals.

== 2012 NFL Division 2 season ==
In a pre-season friendly, Admiralty beat S.League side Geylang United, a team that was playing its football 2 divisions above the Wolves, with a 2–1 scoreline, giving everyone a sense of things to come. Observers at the friendly match thought that Admiralty was in no way inferior to the Eagles.

Admiralty conquered the 2012 NFL Division 2 in great fashion, bulldozing their way across the league and embarking on a 12 match unbeaten run since the start of the season. They were crowned as NFL Division 2 champions on 30 June 2012 with 4 matches to spare.

During the S.League mid-season break, Tampines Rovers made an inquiry to Admiralty about the availability of tough tackling defender Shariff Abdul Samat. Upon hearing about the inquiry, Venga immediately released Shariff's Local Transfer Certificate, allowing the former 2007 S.League Young Player of the Year to make his return to the S.League.

This was also around the same time where Geylang United came knocking on Admiralty's doors asking for the services of player-coach Mohd Noor Ali. Noor Ali was allowed to leave for the club where he played for 6 seasons in the S.League, joining the Eagles as their assistant coach.

Following Noor Ali's departure, midfielder Azhar Baksin was installed as the new player-coach while defender Tan Sio Beng was appointed as the player-assistant coach. Both players were chosen due to their match experience in the S.League, as well as their valuable experience as ex-Singapore internationals.

After a dominant season in Division 2, Admiralty submitted their application to join the 2013 S.League season in July 2012 but their bid was rejected. A FAS spokesman explained that this was because the S.League will remain a 13-team competition next season.

== Rivalries ==
Admiralty FC has a huge rivalry with fellow NFL club Sembawang Sports Club, due to the fact that both teams have stemmed from the Sembawang area in northern Singapore. Both teams often locked horns in the NFL Division One in the nineties.

== Notable players ==
- Mohd Noor Ali
- Azhar Baksin
- Tan Sio Beng
- Shariff Abdul Samat
- Jean-Charles Blanpin
- Nordine Talhi

== Achievements ==
- National Football League
  - Division 1 Champions: 2006 & 2007
  - Division 2 Champions: 2012
