= Hind Khoudary =

Palestinian journalist

- هند خضري
- Born: 1995 or 1996; Gaza
- Occupation: Journalist

Hind Osama Al-Khoudary (Arabic: هند خضري) is a Palestinian journalist based in the Gaza Strip. She has reported for multiple media outlets including Al Jazeera English and Anadolu Agency.

== Early life and education ==
Khoudary was born in 1995 or 1996. Her father, Usama el-Khoudary, was an engineer who constructed their family home as well as the runway and airport apron for the Yasser Arafat International Airport. During her childhood, she recalls sleeping in a windowless room for safety, frequent power outages, and learning traditional Palestinian embroidery from her mother, Marwa. She has 8 brothers.

In 2012, Khoudary and her family left Gaza to join her father in the UAE, which she described as “heaven compared to Gaza”. After he died later that year, she moved with her family back to Gaza.

Khoudary has not been formally trained in journalism. In 2015, she joined We Are Not Numbers, a writing mentorship program.

== Career ==
Khoudary has written for Middle East Eye, Anadolu Agency, +972 Magazine, RT, and The Intercept. Her posts on Twitter and Instagram have been cited by The New York Times, NPR, and Utusan Malaysia. Khoudary has worked for Misbar and has been reporting for Al Jazeera English since October 7, 2023.

=== 2018-2019 ===
Khoudary reported on the Great March of Return protests for Amnesty International, RT, Middle East Eye, and Kuwaiti television on a freelance basis. During the protests, she was exposed to tear gas fired by Israeli Defense Forces (IDF) which caused her to faint on one occasion. According to Khoudary, the IDF targeted all Palestinians who approached the Gaza–Israel barrier during the protests, including journalists and paramedics. She stated: "Even if you’re a journalist [...] As long as you are Palestinian and there, you are targeted."

In March 2019, Khoudary was arrested by Hamas and questioned for her social media posts supporting protests against living conditions in Gaza. They threatened her with charges for spying.

=== 2020 Facebook post ===
In 2020, Khoudary made a Facebook post about a joint Palestinian and Israeli Zoom call hosted by the Gaza Youth Committee in which she tagged Hamas officials. Afterwards, six members of the group, including founder Rami Aman, were arrested by Hamas and charged with "normalization". Khoudary stated that she had not intended for them to be arrested when she posted about the event and that she did not support Hamas. However, she also said that she did not oppose Aman's arrest and had tagged the officials "as a protest against normalization activities". Spokesman for Gaza's Interior Ministry, Iyad al-Bozm, made a statement that Khoudary's post had not tipped off Hamas to the event and that Aman had already been under surveillance.

In response to Khoudary's post, Peter Bouckaert, a former Human Rights Watch official, removed Khoudary from a Facebook journalism group which he moderated.

=== 2023-2025 Israel-Gaza War ===
From the beginning of the Gaza war, Khoudary has posted on Twitter and Instagram about her daily life, showing what she describes as Israeli war crimes. Like other Palestinian journalists, her social media following has greatly increased since the war started.

In November 2023, due to Israeli evacuation orders, Khoudary left Gaza City for the south of Gaza. By December, Khoudary’s home had been destroyed by Israeli airstrikes and some of her friends, family, and colleagues had been killed.

Khoudary has spoken about the communication blackouts and was one of the first people in Gaza to receive an e-SIM from the Connecting Humanity project. Khoudary has been interviewed about the challenges of reporting from Gaza, about which she has stated: “To report and live the same exact thing is very overwhelming.”

In May 2024, Khoudary participated via a pre-recorded video message in the “People’s Graduation”, an alternate graduation ceremony for students from several New York City universities. The ceremony was held in the Cathedral of St. John the Divine and organized by faculty and staff from Columbia University. In her message, she thanked the students for protesting and asked them to continue because “we are still being bombed”.

In July 2024, Khoudary reported on the killing of Ismail al-Ghoul by Israeli forces for an Al Jazeera broadcast. She was visibly upset as she spoke about the dangers facing journalists in Gaza: "We do everything [to stay safe]. We wear our press jackets. We wear our helmets. We try not to go anywhere that is not safe. [...] But we have been targeted in normal places where normal citizens are. [...] at the same time, we want to report, we want to tell the world what’s going on.”

== Personal life ==
Khoudary is married.

Khoudary lived in Turkey for four years during the COVID-19 pandemic. She returned to Gaza in August 2023.

== See also ==
- History of Palestinian journalism
