= Uut (disambiguation) =

Uut is the chemical symbol of ununtrium, the former name of a chemical element now called nihonium (Nh).

UUT may also refer to:

- Unit under test, a manufactured product undergoing testing
- Upper urinary tract
- Upper urothelial tumours
- Urmia University of Technology, a university in Iran
