= 2025 Island Wide League =

Island Wide League
- Season: 2025
- Dates: 24 May to 30 August 2025
- Champions: Gymkhana FC
- Promoted: Gymkhana FC; Tanah Merah United
- Matches: 70
- Goals: 303 (4.33 per match)
- Top goalscorer: Aiman Hafiz (13 goals)
- Biggest home win: Bedok South 9-0 East Dragon (1 Jun 2025)
- Biggest away win: Yishun 0-10 Gymkhana (12 Jul 2025); East Dragon 0-10 Tanah Merah (23 Jul 2025)
- Highest scoring: Mattar Sailors 10-3 Simei Utd (28 Jun 2025)

The 2025 Island Wide League is the 2025 season of the Island Wide League (IWL), the fourth-tier Men's football league in Singapore under the Football Association of Singapore.

== Summary ==
Most of the matches were played in Secondary Schools, except Semi-Finals and the Final.

On 3 March 2025, Football Association of Singapore (FAS) invited non-member clubs to register their interest in participating in the Island Wide League 2025 (IWL). The competition will be held from 24 May to August 2025.

Bedok South Avenue FC and Eunos Crescent FC was relegated from the 2024 Singapore Football League 2. However, Eunos Crescent has withdrawn from Singapore Football League.

2024 IWL teams Balestier United RC, East Coast United, Jungfrau Punggol 'B', Sembawang Park Rangers and Singapore Recreational Club will not be participating in the 2025 season.

Four teams, Admiralty City FC, East Dragon FC, Sembawang City FC and Woodlands Lions FC, made their debut in Singapore Football League after registering for the 2025 IWL season.

Commonwealth Cosmos FC will be returning to IWL after withdrawing from SFL 2 in 2022. Yishun FC will also be returning to the IWL after missing out in 2024.

Gymkhana FC was crowned as the 2025 IWL champions after defeating Tanah Merah United 3-2 in the Final on 30 August 2025. The two finalists will be promoted to 2026 SFL Division 2.

== Competition format ==
The IWL competition shall be played on a single round-robin Group Stage basis, followed by a single-leg Knockout Stage.

Teams have been split into three groups of seven for the single round-robin group stage.

At the conclusion of the IWL 2025 Season, the two finalists of the IWL shall be promoted to the SFL 2 for the following season.

== Group stage ==
=== Group A ===
Pos	Team	Pld	W	D	L	GF	GA	GD	Pts
1	Gymkhana FC (Q)	6	5	1	0	24	2	+22	16
2	Geylang Serai FC (Q)	6	4	1	1	17	9	+8	13
3	Woodlands Rangers FC (Q)	6	4	0	2	18	14	+4	12
4	Verde Cresta Combined SC	6	2	1	3	10	12	−2	7
5	Yishun FC	6	1	1	4	9	25	−16	4
6	Commonwealth Cosmos FC	6	0	4	2	5	13	−8	4
7	Admiralty City FC	6	0	2	4	9	17	−8	2

Updated to match(es) played on 27 Jul 2025. Source: fas.org.sg
Rules for classification: 1) points; 2) goal difference; 3) number of goals scored; 4) number of wins
(Q) Qualified for Quarter-finals

24 May 2025 2	Admiralty City	0-1	Gymkhana	Fuhua Secondary
15:00 UTC+8		Report

25 May 2025 5	Commonwealth Cosmos	0-3	Woodlands Rangers	Regent Secondary
14:30 UTC+8		Report

25 May 2025 7	Verde Cresta Combined	1-3	Geylang Serai	Anderson Secondary
17:00 UTC+8	Muhaimin		Alif Jamil; Muhammad Rohaizad	Player of the Match: Alif Jamil

1 Jun 2025 12	Yishun	2-2	Admiralty City	Hua Yi Secondary
15:00 UTC+8		Report

1 Jun 2025 15	Gymkhana	4-0	Verde Cresta Combined	Hua Yi Secondary
17:00 UTC+8		Report

1 Jun 2025 18	Geylang Serai	0-0	Commonwealth Cosmos	Fuhua Secondary
17:00 UTC+8		Report		Player of the Match: Nasri Suhaimi

14 Jun 2025 19	Woodlands Rangers	2-5	Geylang Serai	Fuhua Secondary
17:00 UTC+8

15 Jun 2025 21	Verde Cresta Combined	3-0	Yishun	Regent Secondary
15:00 UTC+8
Note: 3-0 was awarded to Verde Cresta Combined. The match initially ended as 3-4.

15 Jun 2025 24	Commonwealth Cosmos	P-P	Gymkhana	Regent Secondary
17:00 UTC+8
Note: Match postponed due to inclement weather

21 Jun 2025 30	Verde Cresta Combined	3-1	Admiralty City	Fuhua Secondary
17:00 UTC+8	Akasha; Naufal; Sam		Goal

22 Jun 2025 34	Woodlands Ranger	1-5	Gymkhana	Nan Hua High
15:00 UTC+8

22 Jun 2025 35	Commonwealth Cosmos	1-6	Yishun FC	Nan Hua High
17:00 UTC+8

29 Jun 2025 40	Gymkhana	3-0	Geylang Serai	Fuhua Secondary
15:00 UTC+8

29 Jun 2025 43	Yishun	0-6	Woodlands Rangers	Fuhua Secondary
17:00 UTC+8

5 Jul 2025 44	Commonwealth Cosmos	1-1	Verde Cresta Combined	Fuhua Secondary
15:00 UTC+8	Goal	Report	Ryhan

6 Jul 2025 47	Geylang Serai	3-1	Yishun	Hua Yi Secondary
15:00 UTC+8	A. Mustafah	Report	Goal	Player of the Match: A. Mustafah

6 Jul 2025 50	Woodlands Rangers	3-2	Admiralty City	Jurong West Secondary
17:00 UTC+8

12 Jul 2025 53	Yishun	0-10	Gymkhana	Fuhua Secondary
15:00 UTC+8

13 Jul 2025 56	Verde Cresta Combined	2-3	Woodlands Rangers	Hua Yi Secondary
14:30 UTC+8	Norief; Zayan	Report

13 Jul 2025 59	Admiralty City	2-6	Geylang Serai	Hua Yi Secondary
17:00 UTC+8		Report	A. Mustafah; AbdelKader; Muhammad	Player of the Match: A. Mustafah

20 Jul 2025 63	Admiralty City	2-2	Commonwealth Cosmos	Fuhua Secondary
17:00 UTC+8		Report

27 Jul 2025 24*	Commonwealth Cosmos	1-1	Gymkhana	Regent Secondary
17:00 UTC+8
Note: This match was rescheduled from 15 June 2025.

=== Group B ===
Pos	Team	Pld	W	D	L	GF	GA	GD	Pts
1	Winchester Isla FC (Q)	6	4	2	0	15	4	+11	14
2	Tanah Merah United FC (Q)	6	4	1	1	24	6	+18	13
3	Singapore Xin Hua SC (Q)	6	4	1	1	17	5	+12	13
4	Bedok South Avenue SC	6	3	0	3	17	7	+10	9
5	Mattar Sailors	6	3	0	3	19	14	+5	9
6	Simei United FC	6	1	0	5	8	27	−19	3
7	East Dragon FC	6	0	0	6	1	38	−37	0

Updated to match(es) played on 26 Jul 2025. Source: fas.org.sg
Rules for classification: 1) points; 2) goal difference; 3) number of goals scored; 4) number of wins
(Q) Qualified for Quarter-finals.

24 May 2025 1	Simei United	0-3	Singapore Xin Hua	Punggol Community Club
14:30 UTC+8		Report		Player of the Match: Samuel Soh

24 May 2025 3	Mattar Sailors	3-2	Bedok South Avenue	Fuhua Secondary
17:00 UTC+8	Goal	Report	Zachary; Kerwin

25 May 2025 8	East Dragon	1-3	Winchester Isla	Regent Secondary
17:00 UTC+8	Akif	Report	Justin Nirmalan

31 May 2025 11	Tanah Merah United	P-P	Mattar Sailors	Woodgrove Secondary
17:00 UTC+8		Report
Note: Match postponed due to inclement weather.

1 Jun 2025 14	Winchester Isla	4-0	Simei United	Woodgrove Secondary
15:00 UTC+8		Report

1 Jun 2025 17	Bedok South Avenue	9-0	East Dragon	Woodgrove Secondary
17:00 UTC+8	Irgy; Ryan; Shafiq; Mustaqim; Wildan; Rashe	Report

15 Jun 2025 22	Singapore Xin Hua	P-P	Winchester Isla	Hua Yi Secondary
15:00 UTC+8
Note: Match postponed due to inclement weather

15 Jun 2025 25	East Dragon	P-P	Tanah Merah United	Hua Yi Secondary
17:00 UTC+8
Note: Match postponed due to inclement weather

15 Jun 2025 26	Simei United	P-P	Bedok South Avenue	Fuhua Secondary
17:00 UTC+8
Note: Match postponed due to inclement weather

21 Jun 2025 28	Singapore Xin Hua	2-1	Bedok South Avenue	Punggol Community Club
17:00 UTC+8	Reyas (o.g.); Wycliffe		Ryan	Player of the Match: Wycliffe Tan

21 Jun 2025 31	East Dragon	0-6	Mattar Sailors	Crest Secondary
17:00 UTC+8

21 Jun 2025 32	Simei United	2-7	Tanah Merah United	Nan Hua High
17:00 UTC+8

28 Jun 2025 37	Tanah Merah United	3-2	Singapore Xin Hua	Punggol Community Club
14:30 UTC+8

28 Jun 2025 39	Mattar Sailors	10-3	Simei United	Crest Secondary
19:00 UTC+8

5 Jul 2025 46	Simei United	3-0	East Dragon	Woodgrove Secondary
17:00 UTC+8

6 Jul 2025 49	Winchester Isla	1-1	Tanah Merah United	Hua Yi Secondary
17:00 UTC+8		Report

6 Jul 2025 52	Singapore Xin Hua	2-0	Mattar Sailors	Fuhua Secondary
17:00 UTC+8	Vikram Selvam; Perwira Salimi	Report

12 Jul 2025 54	Tanah Merah United FC	0-1	Bedok South Avenue	Fuhua Secondary
17:00 UTC+8		Report

13 Jul 2025 57	East Dragon	P-P	Singapore Xin Hua	Regent Secondary
14:30 UTC+8		Report
Note: Match postponed due to inclement weather

13 Jul 2025 60	Mattar Sailors	P-P	Winchester Isla	Regent Secondary
17:00 UTC+8
Note: Match postponed due to inclement weather

19 Jul 2025 11*	Tanah Merah United	3-0	Mattar Sailors	Choa Chu Kang Stadium
19:30 UTC+8		Report
Note: This match was rescheduled from 31 May 2025.

20 Jul 2025 62	Bedok South Avenue	1-2	Winchester Isla	Fuhua Secondary
14:30 UTC+8		Report	Ethan; Ridzuan

23 Jul 2025 22*	Singapore Xin Hua	1-1	Winchester Isla	Choa Chu Kang Stadium
19:45 UTC+8	Ted Wee		Jim
Note: This match was rescheduled from 15 June 2025.

23 Jul 2025 25*	East Dragon	0-10	Tanah Merah United	Bedok Stadium
19:45 UTC+8
Note: This match was rescheduled from 15 June 2025.

26 Jul 2025 57*	East Dragon	0-7	Singapore Xin Hua	Punggol Community Club
14:30 UTC+8
Note: This match was rescheduled from 13 July 2025.

26 Jul 2025 60*	Mattar Sailors	0-4	Winchester Isla	Crest Secondary
19:00 UTC+8			Hafiz; Jim
Note: This match was rescheduled from 13 July 2025.

26 Jul 2025 26*	Simei United	0-3	Bedok South Avenue	Choa Chu Kang Stadium
19:30 UTC+8
Note: This match was rescheduled from 15 June 2025.

=== Group C ===
Pos	Team	Pld	W	D	L	GF	GA	GD	Pts
1	Sembawang City FC (Q)	6	6	0	0	22	5	+17	18
2	Bukit Timah FC (Q)	6	4	0	2	11	11	0	12
3	Eastern Thunder FC	6	3	1	2	17	9	+8	10
4	Tessensohn Khalsa Rovers	6	3	0	3	11	15	−4	9
5	Ayer Rajah Gryphons FC	6	2	2	2	10	11	−1	8
6	Pasirian Lions FC	6	1	1	4	6	13	−7	4
7	Woodlands Lions FC	6	0	0	6	7	20	−13	0

Updated to match(es) played on 26 Jul 2025. Source: fas.org.sg
Rules for classification: 1) points; 2) goal difference; 3) number of goals scored; 4) number of wins
(Q) Qualified for Quarter-finals.

25 May 2025 4	Sembawang City	4-1	Bukit Timah	Hua Yi Secondary
14:30 UTC+8	Shafeeq Ameer	Report	Goal

25 May 2025 6	Eastern Thunder	2-2	Ayer Rajah Gryphons	Hua Yi Secondary
17:00 UTC+8	Cameron Bell	Report	Goal

25 May 2025 9	Pasirian Lions	2-1	Woodlands Lions	Fuhua Secondary
17:00 UTC+8

31 May 2025 10	Tessensohn Khalsa	P-P	Eastern Thunder	Fuhua Secondary
17:00 UTC+8
Note: Match postponed due to inclement weather

1 Jun 2025 13	Woodlands Lions	2-4	Sembawang City	Regent Secondary
15:00 UTC+8		Report	Aiman; Radin

1 Jun 2025 16	Ayer Rajah Gryphons	0-0	Pasirian Lions	Regent Secondary
17:00 UTC+8		Report

14 Jun 2025 20	Bukit Timah	2-1	Woodlands Lions	Woodgrove Secondary
17:00 UTC+8

15 Jun 2025 23	Pasirian Lions	2-4	Tessensohn Khalsa	Westwood Secondary
15:00 UTC+8

15 Jun 2025 27	Sembawang City	P-P	Ayer Rajah Gryphons	Westwood Secondary
17:00 UTC+8
Note: Match postponed due to inclement weather

21 Jun 2025 29	Bukit Timah	4-2	Ayer Rajah Gryphons	Nan Hua High School
15:00 UTC+8

22 Jun 2025 33	Pasirian Lions	1-3	Eastern Thunder	Fuhua Secondary
15:00 UTC+8	5'	Report	Li Ming; Delphis; Jasper

22 Jun 2025 36	Sembawang City	4-1	Tessensohn Khalsa	Fuhua Secondary
17:00 UTC+8

28 Jun 2025 38	Ayer Rajah Gryphons	2-1	Woodlands Lions	Fuhua Secondary
17:00 UTC+8

29 Jun 2025 41	Eastern Thunder	P-P	Sembawang City	Nan Hua High
17:00 UTC+8

29 Jun 2025 42	Tessensohn Khalsa	3-1	Bukit Timah	Nan Hua High
17:00 UTC+8

5 Jul 2025 45	Sembawang City	3-0	Pasirian Lions	Fuhua Secondary
17:00 UTC+8

6 Jul 2025 48	Woodlands Lions	1-2	Tessensohn Khalsa	Regent Secondary
15:00 UTC+8

6 Jul 2025 51	Bukit Timah	1-0	Eastern Thunder	Regent Secondary
17:00 UTC+8

12 Jul 2025 55	Tessensohn Khalsa	1-3	Ayer Rajah Gryphons	Woodgrove Secondary
17:00 UTC+8

13 Jul 2025 58	Pasirian Lions	1-2	Bukit Timah	Jurong West Secondary
17:00 UTC+8		Report

13 Jul 2025 61	Eastern Thunder	8-1	Woodlands Lions	Fuha Secondary
17:00 UTC+8	Timothy; Delphis; Mohan; Russell; Wayne; Fiyandy	Report

17 Jul 2025 10*	Tessensohn Khalsa	0-4	Eastern Thunder	Jalan Besar Stadium
19:45 UTC+8		Report	Fiyandy; Delphis; Sean (pen.)
Note: This match was rescheduled from 31 May 2025.

20 Jul 2025 27*	Sembawang City	3-1	Ayer Rajah Gryphons	Jalan Besar Stadium
UTC+8
Note: This match was rescheduled from 15 June 2025.

26 Jul 2025 41*	Eastern Thunder	0-4	Sembawang City	Choa Chu Kang Stadium
17:00 UTC+8
Note: This match was rescheduled from 29 June 2025.

== Knock-out stage ==
=== Quarter-Finals ===
3 Aug 2025 QF1	Sembawang City	5-0	Woodlands Rangers	Woodlands Stadium
15:00 UTC+8	Aidan; Safirul; Fazil

3 Aug 2025 QF2	Gymkhana	2-1	Singapore Xin Hua	Serangoon Stadium
17:00 UTC+8

3 Aug 2025 QF3	Tanah Merah United	2-1	Geylang Serai	Woodlands Stadium
19:30 UTC+8

3 Aug 2025 QF4	Winchester Isla	0-3	Bukit Timah	Serangoon Stadium
19:30 UTC+8

=== Semi Finals ===
17 Aug 2025 SF1	Sembawang City	1-1 (4–5 p)	Tanah Merah United	Our Tampines Hub
17:30 UTC+8
	Penalties
	Penalty scored Penalty missed		(penalty scored) #2 Hariyun; (penalty scored) #14 Elfian; (penalty scored) #18 Surya; (penalty scored) #9 Muhaimin

17 Aug 2025 SF2	Gymkhana	4-1	Bukit Timah	Our Tampines Hub
20:00 UTC+8

=== Final ===
30 Aug 2025 Final	Tanah Merah United	2-3	Gymkhana	Jurong East Stadium
18:00 UTC+8	Faizal Mohamed 80'; Ahmad Danish 90+'	Report	Bawantha Buddhika 4'; Is Hazwan 4'; Haziq Jantan 122'
Note: Both teams will be promoted to 2026 SFL2 after qualifying for the Final.

== Awards ==
=== Top scorers ===
Updated on 13 Sep 2025

Rank	Player	Club	Goals
1	(Singapore) Aiman Hafiz	Sembawang City	13
2	(Sri Lanka) Bawantha Buddhika	Gymkhana FC	8
3	(Singapore) Affan Syahin	Tanah Merah United	7
3	(Singapore) Ashraf Mustafah	Geylang Serai	7
4	(Singapore) Deniel Aliqin	Woodlands Ranger	5
4	(Singapore) Mustaffa Ali	Woodlands Ranger	5

Source: fas.org.sg

== See also ==
- 2025 Singapore Football League
- Singapore FA Cup
- Football in Singapore
- Football Association of Singapore
