= Azhar Baksin =

Singaporean footballer

Personal information
- Birth name: Azhar bin Baksin
- Date of birth: 26 November 1976 (age 49)
- Place of birth: Singapore
- Height: 1.76 m (5 ft 9 1/2 in)
- Position: Midfielder

Team information
- Current team: Admiralty
- Number: 17

Senior career*
Years	Team	Apps	(Gls)
1997 – 1999	Tampines Rovers	?	(?)
2000 – 2002	Geylang United	62	(11)
2003 – 2007	Home United	64	(2)
2008 – 2009	Sengkang Punggol	21	(1)
2012 –	Admiralty	12	(3)

International career
??	Singapore	20	(3)
- * Club domestic league appearances and goals as of July 13, 2012

Azhar bin Baksin (born 26 November 1976) is an ex-Singaporean international footballer who plays as a midfielder for NFL Division 2 side Admiralty FC.

Apart from his playing duties, he was also appointed as the coach of the Wolves following the departure of former player coach Mohd Noor Ali to Geylang United in June 2012.

== Club career ==
A true veteran, Azhar has played for S.League sides Tampines Rovers, Geylang United, Home United and Sengkang Punggol, before switching over to Admiralty FC during the 2012 NFL Division 2 season.

Azhar scored a goal from the half-way line when he was playing for Geylang United against Woodlands Wellington in 2002, lobbing the ball past Woodlands' custodian Fadhil Salim. That goal was subsequently nominated for the 2002 S.League Goal of the Season but did not win in the end.

His honours include winning the S.League with Geylang United in 2000, and the S.League and Singapore Cup double with Home United in the 2003 season.

== International career ==
Azhar Baksin was first noted as an outstanding player during a training tour of Thailand for the Singapore national team's reserve squad between 21 and 30 November 1997. He emerged as the top contender among the up-and-coming footballers, which included Indra Sahdan and Ahmad Latiff Khamaruddin, for a national team call-up based on his performances during the training tour.

He was called up to the Singapore national team after scoring two goals in Tampines Rovers' 2-0 victory against Gombak United on 21 March 1998.

Azhar played in the Asian Cup qualifier against a star-studded Japanese team featuring the likes of Shinji Ono and Masashi Nakayama in 2000.

One of his most memorable international goals came in the NTUC Income Challenge Cup in 2002, where he fired home a blistering right-footed volley to lift Singapore to a 2-1 victory over North Korea after coming on as a second-half substitute.

Azhar's fine form with Geylang United made him a notable replacement for the off-form Mirko Grabovac during the 2002 Tiger Cup.

He also has the honour of being the first Singapore international to score at the newly constructed Jalan Besar Stadium on 4 March 2003 after just 8 minutes in an international friendly against the Maldives. The match ended 4-1 in favour to the Lions with Indra Sahdan, Syed Fadhil and Fadzuhasny Juraimi getting on the scoresheet for Singapore as well.
