= Rami Aman =

Palestinian journalist and peace activist

- رامي أمان
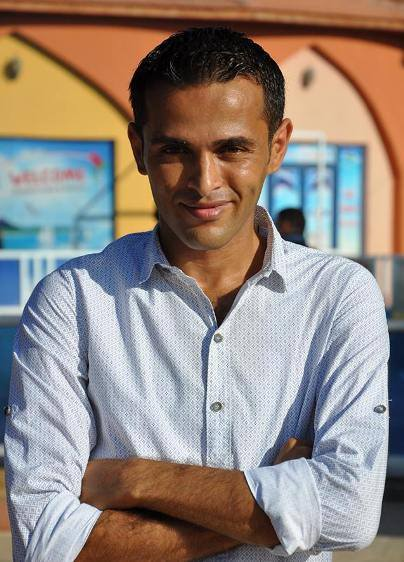
- Born: Gaza
- Occupations: Journalist, Peace Activist
- Years active: 2010-present
- Known for: organizing small-scale video chats between Israelis and Palestinian peace activists; incarceration by Hamas

Rami Aman (Arabic: رامي أمان; born 1981/1982) is a Palestinian journalist and peace activist in the Gaza Strip. Aman founded the Gaza Youth Committee, through which since 2015 Aman has been organizing small-scale video chats between Israelis and Palestinian peace activists in the Gaza Strip in an initiative called "Skype With Your Enemy." On 9 April 2020, Aman was arrested by Hamas at the Internal Security headquarters in Gaza City. He was charged with "weakening revolutionary spirit" for his role in organizing the April 2020 video call with Israelis. He was released in October 2020.

== Background ==
Rami Aman was born in Gaza, and is a journalist. He has been active in supporting peace and Israeli-Palestinian co-existence, as well as intra-Palestinian peace.

== Activism ==
In 2010, Aman founded the Gaza Youth Committee, an organization that seeks to connect people in Gaza with the outside world through the internet. Since 2015, through the committee, Aman has been organizing small-scale video chats between Israelis and Palestinian peace activists in the Gaza Strip in an initiative called "Skype With Your Enemy."

In 2017, Aman was able to visit the United States for three months as part of a Leaders for Democracy fellowship.

In 2019 he organized cycling events held with Israeli cyclists, with participants separated by the border fence. Aman was arrested for helping to organize the cycling event.

In October 2023, Aman criticized the Israeli attacks on Gaza as part of the Gaza war, noting that the conditions prevented anti-Hamas protests and that the attacks would likely further radicalize Gazans.

== Detention and release ==
On 6 April 2020, amid the COVID-19 pandemic, the Gaza Youth Committee held one of its largest videoconferences via Zoom, with more than 200 participants. Opponents of normalizing relations with Israel were also on the call, resulting in a public uproar; journalist Hind Khoudary criticized the event publicly and tagged Hamas officials in a Facebook post about Aman. Hamas arrested Aman and several other Gazan call participants.

On 9 April 2020, Aman surrendered himself at the Hamas Internal Security headquarters in Gaza City.

Aman's wife was arrested alongside Aman in 2021, but was released soon after on bail. On June 28, 2020, she visited Aman in prison and asked him for a divorce; he refused, believing her request was coerced. In August 2020, Aman signed divorce papers with the stipulation that he would be released the following day; however, Aman remained in prison.

On 9 September 2020, a coalition of 70 NGOs lodged a complaint with the UN Working Group on Arbitrary Detention regarding the detention of Aman and demanded his release.

On 24 September 2020, The New York Times reported that Hamas military prosecutors in Gaza had charged Aman and two other Palestinian peace activists with "weakening revolutionary spirit" for their role in organizing the April 2020 video call with Israelis.

On 26 October 2020, the Permanent Military Court in Gaza issued a decision to release Rami Aman, on a suspended sentence, sufficed with the time they served.

== Personal life ==
In 2018, Aman met his future wife after she separated from her first husband. Her father was an exiled Hamas official living in Egypt. In early 2020, the two married. Following Aman's coerced divorce with his wife, she was brought to Egypt by a Hamas delegation in October and turned over to relatives there. The Associated Press was able to contact Aman's ex-wife, who confirmed she had been coerced into the divorce.

Rami Aman has been living in Egypt since December 2021.
