= Jafar Abdollahi-Sharif =

President of Urmia University of Technology (born 1963)

2nd [[President of Urmia University of Technology]]
- Incumbent
- Assumed office June 2015
- Preceded by: Iraj Mirzaei

Personal details
- Born: Jafar Abdollahi-Sharif; 1963 (age 62–63) Urmia, Iran
- Education: University of Tehran; Moscow State University (ph.d)
- Profession: College administrator, Academic in the fields of Mining and Geology

Jafar Abdollahi-Sharif (born 1963, in Urmia, West Azerbaijan) is the president of Urmia University of Technology since June 2015. Abdollahi-Sharif is also a faculty member of the college of engineering at Urmia University.

== See also ==
- Jafar Abdollahi-Sharif at Urmia University of Technology

Academic offices
Preceded by Iraj Mirzaei	President of Urmia University of Technology; 2015–present	Succeeded by N/A (incumbent)
