= Tan Sio Beng =

Singaporean footballer

Personal information
- Date of birth: 27 June 1976 (age 50)
- Place of birth: Singapore
- Position: Defender

Team information
- Current team: Admiralty FC
- Number: 22

Senior career*
Years	Team	Apps	(Gls)
1999 – 2002	Balestier Khalsa	?	(?)
2003	Sengkang Marine FC	?	(?)
2004	Tanjong Pagar United	?	(?)
2005	Balestier Khalsa	?	(?)
2006 – 2007	Sengkang Punggol	?	(?)
2008 – 2009	Singapore Cricket Club	?	(?)
2010	Sengkang Punggol	?	(?)
2011	Singapore Cricket Club	?	(?)
2012	Admiralty FC	12	(1)

International career
2002 – 2004	Singapore	7	(1)
- * Club domestic league appearances and goals as of 2 July 2012

Tan Sio Beng is a Singaporean former footballer who played as a defender for NFL Division 2 side Admiralty FC and the Singapore national football team.

== Club career ==
Tan's performances during training for Balestier Khalsa led to his debut in 1999 after he impressed Tigers coach PN Sivaji.

Tan has turned out for S.League sides Balestier Khalsa, Sengkang Marine and Tanjong Pagar United as well as two stints with Singapore Cricket Club in the NFL Division 1 before making the switch to Admiralty FC in 2012. He spent five seasons at Balestier Khalsa and four seasons at Sengkang Punggol.

Tan had an on-pitch fight with Gusta Guzarishah during a match between Balestier Khalsa and Home United in 1999.

Tan was sent off while playing for Balestier Khalsa in 2005 for violent conduct after Home United skipper Aide Iskandar's challenge on Balestier's keeper, Rizal Rahman, sparked a fight. Balestier subsequently lodged an appeal against the red card but the appeal was rejected.

In 2007, Tan was punished by Sengkang Punggol after his side's 4-3 win over Phnom Penh Empire in a Singapore Cup first-round match for shouting obscenities at his coach, Jörg Steinebruner after he was reprimanded for his poor performance on the pitch that day.

== International career ==
Tan was included in the 2002 Tiger Cup squad after his convincing displays in the S.League for Balestier Khalsa.

He has played a total of 7 times for Singapore and scored 1 goal at international level.

== Coaching career ==
Following the departure of former player coach Mohd Noor Ali to Geylang United in June 2012, Tan was also appointed as the assistant coach of the Wolves.

Tan was also the coach for Nanyang Junior College's soccer team.
