= Sharif (disambiguation) =

Sharif (also spelled Sherif) is an Arabic word (شريف) meaning "noble", "highborn", or "honourable", traditionally used as a title for the descendants of the family of the Islamic prophet Muhammad.

Sharif may also refer to:

== Name ==
- Sherif or Sharif, a proper name (including a list of people with this name)

== People ==
- Sharif (surname)
- Sharif Finch (born 1995), American football player
- Sharif Hikmat Nashashibi co-founder and chairman of Arab Media Watch
- Sharif family, a Pakistani political family based in Punjab

== Villages in Iran ==
- Sharif, Ilam
- Sharif, Khuzestan

== Other uses ==
- Sharif of Mecca
- Sharif University of Technology in Iran

== See also ==
- Shareef (disambiguation)
- Mazar-i-Sharif
- Sharifabad (disambiguation)
- Sharifate of Mecca
- Sharifian (disambiguation)
- Sharifism, term used for the rising prominence of the shurafāʾ in early modern Morocco
