= Sherif =

Sherif, also spelled Sharif (and, in countries where Francophone Romanization is the norm, Cherif or Charif), is a proper name derived from the Arabic word sharīf (شريف, 'noble', 'highborn', 'honorable'), originally a title designating a person descended from the family of the Islamic prophet Muhammad. More broadly, the title sharīf was historically applied to anyone of noble ancestry or political preeminence in Islamic countries.

The name has no etymological connection with the English term sheriff, which comes from the Old English word scīrgerefa, meaning "shire-reeve", the local reeve (enforcement agent) of the king in the shire (county).

== Given name ==
- Sherif Abdel-Fadil (born 1983), Egyptian footballer
- Sherif Ahmeti (1920–1998), commentator and translator of the Quran into Albanian
- Sherif Alaa (born 1992), Egyptian footballer
- Sherif Arafa (born 1960), Egyptian director, writer and producer
- Sherif Ashraf (born 1987), Egyptian footballer
- Sherif Boubaghla (1820–1854), Algerian military resistance leader who led a struggle against the French colonial invasion
- Sherif Dabo (born 1994), Egyptian footballer
- Sherif Desoky (born 1967), Egyptian actor, director, author, and storyteller
- Sherif Ekramy (born 1983), Egyptian goalkeeper
- Sherif El Bendary (born 1978), Egyptian film director, writer and producer
- Sherif El-Digwy (born 1965), Egyptian judoka.
- Sherif El-Erian (born 1970), Egyptian modern pentathlete
- Sherif El-Khashab (born 1961), Egyptian football manager
- Sherif El-Masri (born 1990), Canadian soccer player
- Sherif El-Saket (born 1970), Egyptian table tennis player.
- Sherif El Shemerly, Egyptian volleyball coach
- Sherif Farrag (born 1987), Egyptian-American fencer
- Sherif Fawaz Sharaf (born 1938), retired Jordanian administrator and ambassador
- Sherif Fawzy (born 1990), Egyptian footballer
- Sherif Fouad Aboulkheir (1947–2021), Egyptian basketball player
- Sherif Gaber (born 1993), Egyptian political activist and blogger who was arrested for atheist activism
- Sherif Genedy (born 1979), Egyptian basketball player
- Sherif Ismail (1955–2023), Egyptian engineer who served as Prime Minister of Egypt between 2015 and 2018
- Sherif Jimoh (born 1996), Ivorian footballer
- Sherif Kallaku (born 1998), Albanian footballer
- Sherif Khalil (born 1982), Egyptian water polo player
- Sherif Langu (1877–1956), Albanian politician and one of the founding fathers of Albania
- Sherif Medhat (born 1988), Egyptian footballer
- Sherif Mohie El Din (born 1964), Egyptian conductor and composer
- Sherif Moemen (born 1974), Egyptian handball player
- Sherif Mounir (born 1959), Egyptian actor
- Sherif Othman (born 1982), Egyptian Paralympic powerlifter
- Sherif Sabri Pasha (1895–??), Egyptian politician
- Sherif Sabry (born 1986), Egyptian tennis player
- Sherif Sadiku (born 1998), Albanian footballer
- Sherif Salama (born 1979), Egyptian actor
- Sherif Saleh (born 1954), Egyptian sports shooter
- Sherif Sonbol (1956–2023), Egyptian photographer
- Sherif Touré Coubageat (born 1983), former Togolese footballer
- Sherif Voca (1893–1941), Albanian politician

== Surname ==
- Abdusalam Al-Sherif (born 1989), Saudi footballer
- Ahmed Sherif (born 2003), Egyptian footballer
- Ali Pasha Sherif (1834–1897), Egyptian government official and breeder of Arabian horses
- Amro Sherif (born 1991), Egyptian basketball player
- Basem Al-Sherif (born 1984), Saudi footballer
- Carolyn Sherif (1922–1982), American social psychologist, helped to develop social judgment theory
- Feroz Sherif (born 1971), former Indian footballer and coach
- Hassan Sherif (born 1952), Ethiopian boxer
- Hoza'a Sherif (1961–2015), Lebanese diplomat
- Hussein Sherif, Egyptian taekwondo practitioner
- Ihab el-Sherif (1954–2005), Egyptian ambassador to Iraq, killed by Iraqi kidnappers in July 2005
- K. S. G. Haja Shareef, Indian politician
- Lamine Kaba Sherif (born 1999), Guinean footballer
- Manal al-Sharif (born 1979), Saudi women's right's activist
- Manar al-Sharif (born 1997/98), Syrian peace activist
- Mayar Sherif (born 1996), Egyptian tennis player
- Mohammed Ismail Sherif (born 2002), known as Black Sherif, Ghanaian musician and performer
- Mohamed Saad El Din Sherif (died 1997), Egyptian general and Chairman of the Arab Scout Parliamentary Union
- Mohamed Sherif Mohamed Ragaei Bakr (born 1996), Egyptian footballer
- Muzafer Sherif (1906–1988), Turkish-American psychologist, one of the founders of social psychology
- Nahed Sherif (1942–1981), Egyptian actress
- Nour El-Sherif (1946–2015), Egyptian actor
- Omar Sharif (1932-2015), Egyptian actor (born Michel Yusef Dimitri Chalhoub)
- Safwat El-Sherif (1933–2021), Egyptian politician
- Saida Sherif (1932–2023), Pakistani-British broadcaster, educationalist, humanitarian and poet
- Seif Asser Sherif (born 1995), Egyptian trampolinist
- Sultan Al-Sherif (born 1991), Saudi footballer
- Uche Sherif (born 1983), Nigerian footballer
- Vamba Sherif (born 1973), Liberian-born writer
- Youssef El Sherif (born 1978), Egyptian actor

== See also ==
- Mohamed Sherif (disambiguation), several people
- Muhammed Sharif (disambiguation), a list of people specifically called Muhammed Sharif, Mohamed Sherif, etc.
- Şerif, the name Sherif in Turkish
- Shareef (given name)
- Shareef (surname)
- Sherif Mukhtar, village in Sudan
