= Abdusalam Al-Sherif =

Saudi Arabian footballer

Personal information
- Full name: Abdusalam Al-Sherif
- Date of birth: April 18, 1989 (age 37)
- Place of birth: Saudi Arabia
- Height: 1.74 m (5 ft 9 in)
- Position: Right-back

Senior career*
Years	Team	Apps	(Gls)
2008–2017	Al-Raed FC	55	(0)
- * Club domestic league appearances and goals

Abdusalam Al-Sherif [عبد السلام الشريف in Arabic] (born 18 April 1989) is a Saudi football right-back who played in the Pro League for Al-Raed FC.
