= Gaza Youth Committee =

The Gaza Youth Committee (Arabic: لجنة شباب غزة) is a peace activism organization based in the Gaza Strip. It was founded in 2010 by Rami Aman. As of 2019, the group had more than 200 members.

The organization is a member of Alliance for Middle East Peace.

== Activity ==
The Gaza Youth Committee "wants a peaceful resolution to the Palestinian-Israeli conflict and an end to the Israeli siege on Gaza". Their primary strategy for obtaining these two goals is to support local youth and to build interpersonal relationships between Gazans and Israelis, although the group has also tried to build relationships between Gazans and West Bank residents. The organization also holds non-violence trainings, and has held a letter-writing campaign addressed to international activists.

In 2015, the group began the initiative "Skype with your Enemy", in which the group hosts joint conference calls with both Palestinians and Israelis. During the calls, participants discuss the realities of life in Gaza and Israel.

In 2018, the group held a demonstration in which they released 200 doves, each with a message of peace.

In 2018 and 2019, the group organized Skype calls between Gaza residents and American citizens during Ramadan.

In March 2019, the group's founder, Rami Aman, was arrested following a "Skype with your Enemy" call; he was released shortly afterward.

On Yom HaZikaron 2019, the organization streamed the Alternative Memorial Ceremony, which took place in Tel Aviv and was organized by the Israeli-Palestinian Bereaved Family Forum and Combatants for Peace, in the Gaza Strip. In June of that year, the Gaza Youth Committee organized "Peace and Freedom" cycling and foot races, which were open to both Palestinian and Israeli participants. Three GYC members were arrested after the event, and charged with "normalization".

In 2020, Aman, Manar al-Sharif, and a third GYC member were arrested, again following a Zoom call held with both Palestinians and Israelis.
