= Şerif Turgut =

Turkish journalist and war correspondent

- Occupation: journalist
- Known for: first woman war correspondent of Turkey

Şerif Turgut is a Turkish journalist and the first woman war correspondent of Turkey, best known for her coverage during the Bosnian War.

Şerif Turgut received her master's degree in international politics from George Washington University, USA.

== Early career ==
She decided to be a war correspondent when she saw the photographs from the Omarska camp, a death camp in Bosnia and Herzegovina set up and run by the Army of Republika Srpska in the first months of Bosnian War. She went to Bosnia on her own as a freelance journalist. Intended in the beginning to stay ten days only, she remained in Bosnia for almost five years when her life changed after she witnessed the horror there.

== Bosnian War coverage ==
She reported for the Turkish television channel ATV from the Bosnian War, at which more than hundred thousand people were killed between 1992 and 1995. Turgut went on to cover the Kosovo War, Iraq War and many other conflicts including the Algerian Civil War, Western Sahara War and Second Chechen War. During the Kosovo War, she also helped immigrants, who fled their home to settle in Turkey, by giving information about their relatives living still in Kosovo.

== UN ==
She served more than three years as the United Nations Head of Public Information Office for Central Liberia. During this time, she was involved in creation and management of information dissemination mechanisms in the fields such as demilitarization, social integration, political rehabilitation, elections and post conflict transition.

== Honors ==
She received more than ten national and international awards for her journalism achievement during the Bosnian War. In 2002, Turgut became an International Knight Fellow at Stanford University.

Şerif Turgut featured in the documentary television series titled Savaşı Anlatan Kadınlar (literally: "Women War Correspondents") broadcast by the Turkish channel TRT on the International Women's Day in 2013.

== Personal life ==
She was a friend of Spanish war correspondent Miguel Gil Moreno de Mora, with whom she went to Srebrenica right after the 1995 massacre there. Miguel Gil Moreno was later shot to death in the Sierra Leone Civil War. During her service in the Second Liberian Civil War, she became a friend of the war correspondents Tim Hetherington from England and Chris Hondros from the U.S., who were killed in the 2011 Libyan Civil War.
