= Sharif, Khuzestan =

Sharif شريف
- Village
- Location within Iran
- Coordinates: 31°42′40″N 49°07′09″E
- Country: Iran
- Province: Khuzestan
- County: Shushtar
- Bakhsh: Central
- Rural District: Shahid Modarres

Population (2006)
  - Total: 177
- Time zone: UTC+3:30 (IRST)
  - Summer (DST): UTC+4:30 (IRDT)

Sharif (Persian: شريف, also Romanized as Sharīf) is a village in Shahid Modarres Rural District, in the Central District of Shushtar County, Khuzestan Province, Iran. At the 2006 census, its population was 177, in 36 families.
