= Kairat Lama Sharif =

Kazakhstani diplomat

Kairat Lama Sharif (Kazakh: Qairat Qaiyrbekūly Lama Şarif, Қайрат Қайырбекұлы Лама Шариф; born January 1, 1962) is the Ambassador of Kazakhstan to Saudi Arabia.
