= Jean-Charles Blanpin =

French association football player (born 1989)

Personal information
- Date of birth: 29 October 1989 (age 37)
- Place of birth: Nogent-sur-Marne, France
- Height: 1.78 m (5 ft 10 in)
- Position: Midfielder

Senior career*
Years	Team	Apps	(Gls)
2010–2011	Étoile	30	(0)
- * Club domestic league appearances and goals

Jean-Charles Blanpin (born 29 October 1989) is a French former footballer.

== Career statistics ==
=== Club ===
Club	Season	League			Singapore Cup		Singapore League Cup		Other		Total	
Club	Season	Division	Apps	Goals	Apps	Goals	Apps	Goals	Apps	Goals	Apps	Goals
Étoile	2010	S.League	13	0	1	0	2	0	0	0	16	0
Étoile	2011	S.League	17	0	2	0	0	0	0	0	19	0
Career total			30	0	3	0	2	0	0	0	35	0
