= Sharief =

Sharief is a surname. Notable people with the surname include:

- Barbara Sharief (born 1971), American politician and nurse
- C. K. Jaffer Sharief (1933–2018), Indian politician
- Hajer Sharief (born 1994), Libyan peace and human rights activist
