= Shimon Sharif =

Indian sport shooter

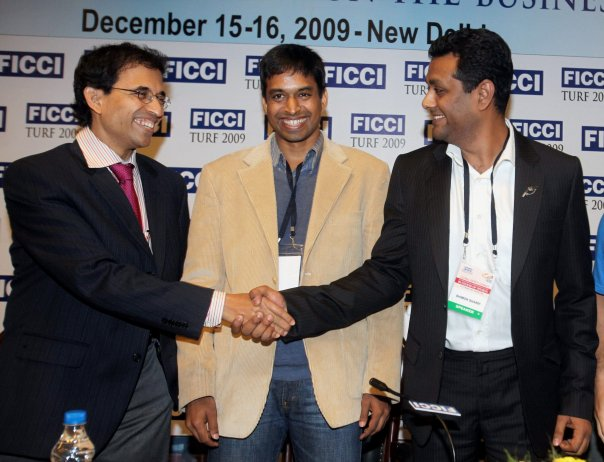
- Shimon Sharif along with Pullela Gopichand and Harsha Bhogle at FICCI TURF 2009

Personal information
- Nationality: Indian
- Born: Shimon Sharif; 7 February 1978 (age 48) New Delhi, Delhi, India
- Education: The Frank Anthony Public School, New Delhi
- Height: 185cm(6ft 1in)
- Weight: 85 kg (187 lb)

Sport
- Country: India
- Sport: Shooting
- Events: 10m Air rifle, 50m Rifle, 10m Running Target
- Team: India, Delhi, CISF
- Coached by: Laszlo Szucsak

Shimon Sharif (born 7 February 1978) is an Indian sport shooter. He started his sports career in 1995. He has participated in several international shooting competitions including the ISSF World Cup at Korea in 2003. He has won multiple medals for Delhi at various National Games of India. In 2007, he became the first Indian to compete in the 10 meter running target event. He is named in the "Limca Book of Records" for floating India’s first website on shooting sport indianshooting.com. He conceptualized Online Shooting during pandemic Covid-19 and has so far organized multiple editions of International Online Shooting Championship and a month-long Online Shooting League which also became the World's first online league in an Olympic sport. Shimon is also the founder of Topgun Shooting Academy.

== Awards and recognition ==
- Limca Book of Records for launching India's first ever website on shooting sport back in 2005.
