= Noha Al-Sharif =

Saudi Arabian sculptor (born 1980)

- Born: 1980 (age 45–46)
- Education: Jeddah College of Fine Arts; School of Oriental and African Studies; Winchester University
- Occupation: Sculptor

Noha Al-Sharif (Arabic: نهى شريف; born 1980) is a Saudi Arabian sculptor. Cited by Arab News as "an expert in Islamic sculpture", she is noted for sculptures with Islamic themes, using porcelain and textile. She has participated in exhibitions in London, Shanghai, and Istanbul.

== Early life and education ==
Al-Sharif was born in Jeddah in 1980. She is well-read in Arabic, Indian, Chinese, and Egyptian art. She graduated from the Jeddah College of Fine Arts in 2004. In 2011 she studied Asian art at the School of Oriental and African Studies in London and later received her PhD in Islamic art from the University of Winchester, with a thesis on the history of the Kiswah. She left London in 2016 and, as of 2025, was lecturing at Qassim University.

== Work ==
She often makes black figurines of women during Islamic prayer such as Jamaa, a group of small women figurines made of marble and resin, between 5 cm and 15 cm in height, and Humbly and devout, a group of four small women figurines which she made in 2008 after taking photographs of women in "abaya". Al-Sharif has stated of her work: "My sculpture so far has been essentially autobiographic, my life in Makkah. To make sculpture out of this background is controversial, but for me it is based in faith and religious and deeply personal. It is that which I explore in my art, out of my experience of life in Makkah where I have lived for much of my life. My sculptures come very precisely from my religious life in the Holy City, even if what I do is not at all conventional in terms of Islamic art and in fact, quite the opposite."

In 2012, she created The Void, a sculpture she describes as symbolizing the emptiness people carry inside, a sense of lacking she views as a strength that pushes people to look for God, love, or enlightenment. One of her works, Hamla, was inspired by groups of women performing Hajj. As of 2014, most of her works were made with clay or marble aggregate with resin, in black only.

== Exhibitions ==
She has exhibited her work as part of a group called "Edge of Arabia", including London in 2008, Riyadh and Istanbul in 2010 and Jeddah in 2012. She has also exhibited in Shanghai. Her 2023 work Vision, a female human-bird form in Saudi granite, was exhibited at Tuwaiq Sculpture 2023. She was one of the Saudi women sculptors taking part in the symposium.
