= Talal al-Sharif =

Jordanian politician

Member of the House of Representatives for the First District of Amman Governorate
- In office 23 January 2013 – 10 September 2013

Talal al-Sharif is a Jordanian politician. He was a member of the House of Representatives for the First District of Amman Governorate and was chosen in the Jordanian general election of January 2013, receiving 2,814 votes in the District. He was expelled from the House of Representatives on 10 September 2013 after shooting an AK-47 on the premises of the House of Representatives, following an argument with another Representative.

== Armed incident ==
During a House meeting on 10 September 2013 al-Sharif had a dispute with fellow Representative Qusai Dmeisi (alternatively spelled Qusay al-Damissi). While the men were shaking hands to resolve the dispute Dmeisi slapped al-Sharif. Al-Sharif then went to his car and collected an AK-47 assault rifle with which he proceeded to try and enter the chamber of Representatives to shoot Dmeisi, but he was stopped by guards. He then proceeded to fire at least two shots in the hallway, leaving Dmeisi unhurt. He was eventually disarmed by the guards and detained. Speaker of the House, Saad Hayel Srour, then suspended the session and called an emergency meeting for later that evening. The incident was said to relate to another incident, between Dmeisi and Representative Yahia al-Saud over parliamentary procedure.

=== Consequences ===
Al-Sharif was arrested with possible charges of attempted murder, unlicensed possession of a firearm, and resisting security forces. For the duration of the investigation into the charges al-Sharif was sent to al-Jouaida prison for fourteen days. Mohammad Barayseh, a fellow Representative from the First District of Amman Governorate, visited al-Sharif in jail and found him to be in bad condition and regretting his actions. After the incident the House of Representatives convened in an emergency meeting in which al-Sharif was expelled from the House, while Dmeisi's membership was frozen for one year because of incitement. The votes were 134 out of 136 in favour. With the incident in mind, the House of Representatives adopted a stronger set of rules of procedure one week after the incident. Under the new rules "acts of serious harm to the Chamber" by a Representative could be punished more severely, including dismissal and suspending the membership. A by-election to fill al-Sharif's seat was announced.

On 28 October, with Al-Sharif still in jail, Representative Yahia al-Saud, was charged with inciting al-Sharif before the incident. The next day he was released due to lack of evidence. A by-election, won by Haitham Abu Khadija, was held to fill al-Sharif's seat in the House of Representatives on 9 November. On 12 November, it was reported that al-Sharif went on a hunger strike to protest against delays in his trial. He was granted bail on 21 November.

=== Similar incidents ===
The incident followed earlier incidents of parliamentarians reaching for guns. Al-Sharif's incident was however the first in which a gun was fired at the premises. A fellow Representative said that the shooting harmed Jordan's reputation.
