= Shamau Shareef =

Maldivian politician

- ޝަމާޢު ޝަރީފް
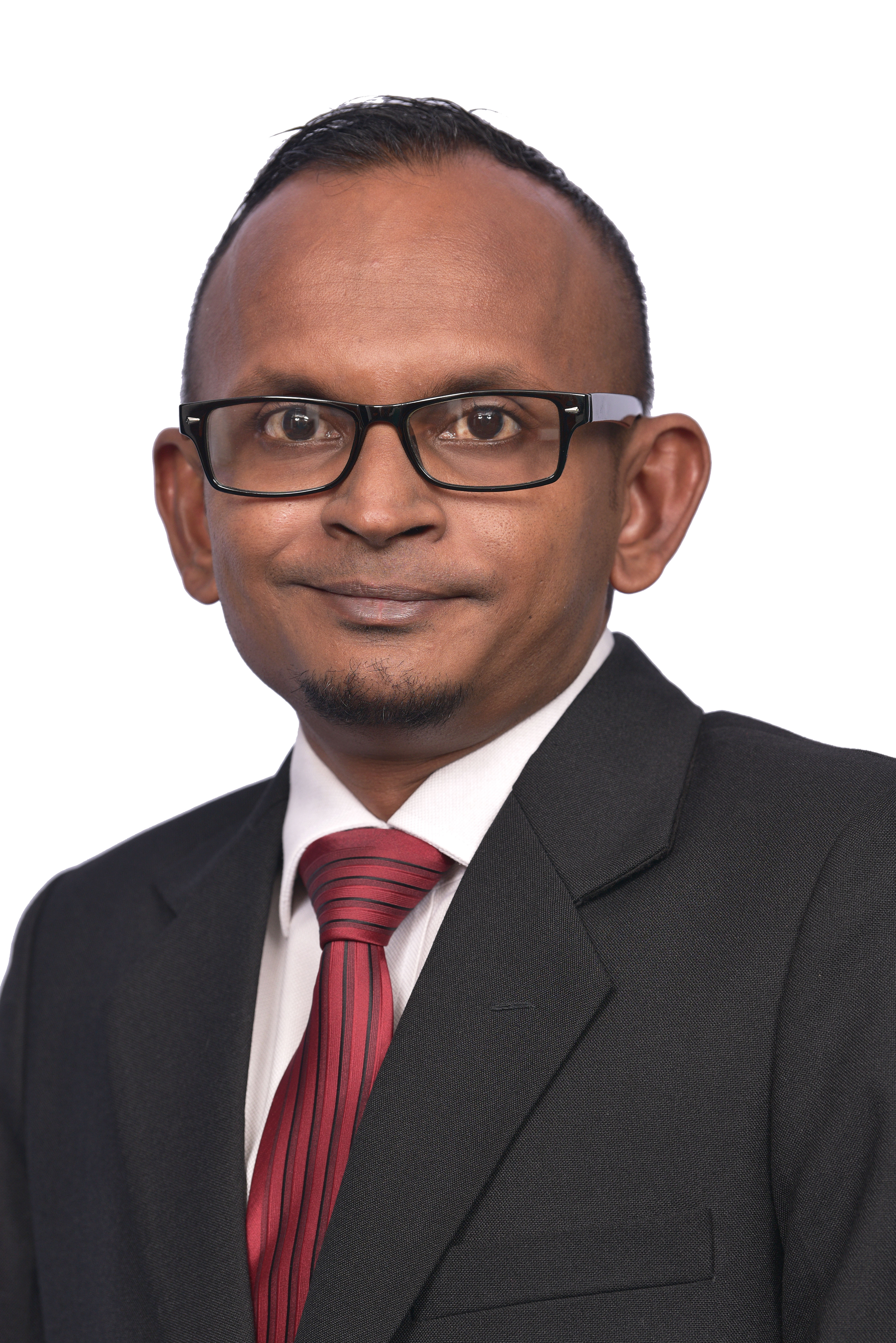
- Official portrait, 2021

Deputy Minister of Health
- In office 24 May 2021 – 17 November 2023
- President: Ibrahim Mohamed Solih

4th Deputy Mayor of Malé City Council
- In office 06 July 2017 – 16 May 2021
- President: Abdulla Yameen; Ibrahim Mohamed Solih

Councillor
- In office 26 February 2014 – 05 July 2017
- President: Abdulla Yameen

Board Member at Local Government Authority
- In office 6 March 2014 – 10 April 2017
- President: Abdulla Yameen

Personal details
- Born: 25 June 1983 (age 43) Malé, Maldives
- Party: Maldivian Democratic Party
- Education: American College of Higher Education; American National College

Shamau Shareef (Dhivehi: ޝަމާޢު ޝަރީފް) is a Maldivian politician was a Deputy Minister of Health. Previously he served at Malé City Council as the 4th Deputy Mayor from 2017 till 2021, He was elected to the council to represent Maafannu Hulhangu Constituency in 2014. He represents the Maldivian Democratic Party, and is also Vice Chair of the party's Rights Committee.

== Career ==
Prior to Shamau's political affiliation, he was the founder and President of Youth For Equality (an NGO) and director of Sanco Maldives Pvt. Ltd, a family owned business specializing in maritime operation.

After joining the Maldivian Democratic Party, Shamau participated in many campaigns and canvassed in different areas of the country. Shamau was the Deputy Coordinator for Malé City during the 2013 Presidential Elections campaign for MDP candidate President Mohamed Nasheed. He stood for office in the February 2014 local council elections and was elected to Malé City Council. Shamau also represented at the second Board of Local Government Authority of Maldives.
