= Mohamed Sherif (disambiguation) =

Mohamed Sherif (born 1996) is a footballer who plays for Al Ahly and the Egypt national team

Mohamed Sherif may also refer to the following Egyptian footballers:

- Mohamed Sherif (footballer, born 1985), who plays for Egyptian Second Division club Tanta SC
- Mohamed Sherif (footballer, born 1993), who plays for Egyptian Second Division club Ismaily SC
