= 2024 Island Wide League =

Island Wide League
- Season: 2024
- Dates: 5 October to 1 December 2024
- Champions: GDT Circuit FC
- Promoted: GDT Circuit FC; Westwood El'Junior
- Matches played: 56
- Goals scored: 257 (4.59 per match)
- Biggest home win: East Coast 15-0 Bukit Timah (2 Nov 2024)
- Biggest away win: Ayer Rajah 2-9 Mattar Sailors (13 Oct 2024)
- Highest scoring: East Coast 15-0 Bukit Timah (2 Nov 2024)

The 2024 Island Wide League is the 2024 season of the FAS Island Wide League (IWL), the fourth-tier Men's amateur football league in Singapore.

== Summary ==
Most of the matches were played in Secondary Schools, except Semi-Finals and the Final.

Admiralty FC returned to IWL under Eastern Thunder FC after changing their name on 22 January 2024.

GDT Circuit emerged as the IWL 2024 Champions after defeating Westwood El'Junior 2-1 after extra time.

== Competition Format ==
The IWL competition shall be played on a single round robin Group Stage basis, followed by a single leg Knockout Stage basis.

Teams have been split into five groups of four for the single round-robin group stage before the winner of each group, together with the three best second-placed teams, will proceed to the single-legged knock-out stage.

== Group Stage ==
=== Group A ===
Pos	Team	Pld	W	D	L	GF	GA	GD	Pts
1	Singapore Xin Hua FC (Q)	6	4	1	1	15	10	+5	13
2	Balestier United RC (Q)	6	3	1	2	24	13	+11	10
3	Pasirian Lions FC	6	3	0	3	12	17	−5	9
4	Tessensohn Khalsa Rovers	6	1	0	5	7	18	−11	3

Updated to match(es) played on 9 Nov 2024. Source: fas.org.sg
Rules for classification: 1) points; 2) goal difference; 3) number of goals scored; 4) number of wins
(Q) Qualified for Quarter-finals

5 Oct 2024 1	Singapore Xin Hua	0-3	Tessensohn Khalsa	Woodlands
15:00 UTC+8				Stadium: Woodgrove Secondary School
Note: M01 awarded 0-3 in favour of Tessensohn Khalsa Rovers

5 Oct 2024 2	Balestier United	6-0	Pasirian Lions	Fuhua Secondary
17:00 UTC+8

13 Oct 2024 15	Tessensohn Khalsa	2-3	Balestier United	Westwood Secondary
15:00 UTC+8

13 Oct 2024 16	Pasirian Lions	1-4	Singapore Xin Hua	Bedok South Secondary
17:00 UTC+8

19 Oct 2024 21	Singapore Xin Hua	4-3	Balestier United	East Spring Secondary
15:00 UTC+8

19 Oct 2024 22	Tessensohn Khalsa	0-4	Pasirian Lions	Fuhua Secondary
17:00 UTC+8

27 Oct 2024 37	Pasirian Lions	2-1	Tessensohn Khalsa	Bedok South Secondary
15:00 UTC+8

27 Oct 2024 38	Balestier United	2-2	Singapore Xin Hua	Bartley Secondary
17:00 UTC+8

3 Nov 2024 47	Pasirian Lions	4-3	Balestier United	Bedok South Secondary
15:00 UTC+8

3 Nov 2024 48	Tessensohn Khalsa	0-2	Singapore Xin Hua	Fuhua Secondary
17:00 UTC+8

9 Nov 2024 51	Singapore Xin Hua	P-P	Pasirian Lions	Westwood Secondary
15:00 UTC+8
Note: M51 – Singapore Xin Hua FC vs Pasirian Lions FC abandoned due to inclement weather

9 Nov 2024 52	Balestier United	7-1	Tessensohn Khalsa	Westwood Secondary
17:00 UTC+8

13 Nov 2024 51*	Singapore Xin Hua	3-1	Pasirian Lions	Jurong East
				Stadium: Jurong East Stadium
Note: M51 – Rescheduled match

=== Group B ===
Pos	Team	Pld	W	D	L	GF	GA	GD	Pts
1	Gymkhana FC (Q)	6	6	0	0	17	5	+12	18
2	Ayer Rajah Gryphons FC	6	2	1	3	11	14	−3	7
3	Singapore Recreational Club	6	1	2	3	10	15	−5	5
4	Mattar Sailors	6	1	1	4	12	16	−4	4

Updated to match(es) played on 14 Nov 2024. Source: fas.org.sg
Rules for classification: 1) points; 2) goal difference; 3) number of goals scored; 4) number of wins
(Q) Qualified for Quarter-finals

5 Oct 2024 3	Mattar Sailors	1-5	Singapore Recreation Club	East Spring Secondary
15:00 UTC+8

5 Oct 2024 4	Gymkhana FC	2-1	Ayer Rajah Gryphons	Westwood Secondary
17:00 UTC+8

13 Oct 2024 17	Singapore Recreation Club	1-3	Gymkhana FC	Bartley Secondary
15:00 UTC+8

13 Oct 2024 18	Ayer Rajah Gryphons	2-9	Mattar Sailors	Westwood Secondary
17:00 UTC+8

20 Oct 2024 25	Mattar Sailors	0-3	Gymkhana FC	Westwood Secondary
15:00 UTC+8

20 Oct 2024 26	Singapore Recreation Club	0-0	Ayer Rajah Gryphons	Bedok South Secondary
17:00 UTC+8

26 Oct 2024 31	Ayer Rajah Gryphons	6-1	Singapore Recreation Club	East Spring Secondary
15:00 UTC+8

26 Oct 2024 32	Gymkhana FC	3-1	Mattar Sailors	Westwood Secondary
17:00 UTC+8

3 Nov 2024 49	Ayer Rajah Gryphons	1-3	Gymkhana FC	Fuhua Secondary
15:00 UTC+8

3 Nov 2024 50	Singapore Recreation Club	2-2	Mattar Sailors	Regent Secondary
17:00 UTC+8

9 Nov 2024 53	Mattar Sailors	P-P	Ayer Rajah Gryphons	East Spring Secondary
15:00 UTC+8
Note: M53 – Mattar Sailors FC vs Ayer Rajah Gryphons FC abandoned due to inclement weather

9 Nov 2024 54	Gymkhana FC	3-1	Singapore Recreation Club	Fuhua Secondary
17:00 UTC+8

14 Nov 2024 53*	Mattar Sailors	0-1	Ayer Rajah Gryphons	East Spring Secondary
Note: M53 – Rescheduled match

=== Group C ===
Pos	Team	Pld	W	D	L	GF	GA	GD	Pts
1	Westwood El'Junior FC (Q)	6	6	0	0	20	6	+14	18
2	Tanah Merah United (Q)	6	3	1	2	16	9	+7	10
3	Sembawang Park Rangers	6	1	0	5	12	25	−13	3
4	Verde Cresta Combined SC	6	1	1	4	13	21	−8	4

Updated to match(es) played on 10 Nov 2024. Source: fas.org.sg
Rules for classification: 1) points; 2) goal difference; 3) number of goals scored; 4) number of wins
(Q) Qualified for Quarter-finals

6 Oct 2024 5	Westwood El'Junior	3-0	Verde Cresta Combined	Westwood Secondary
15:00 UTC+8	Shafiq; Adib; Haqim

6 Oct 2024 6	Sembawang Park	0-3	Tanah Merah United	Fuhua Secondary
17:00 UTC+8			og'; Iswandi Sharin; Elfian Md Fairuz
Note: M06 awarded 0-3 in favour of Tanah Merah United FC

12 Oct 2024 11	Tanah Merah United	2-3	Westwood El'Junior	Woodgrove Secondary
15:00 UTC+8	Nur Khafiz; Dzakariah		Fandi; Adib

12 Oct 2024 12	Verde Cresta Combined	2-3	Sembawang Park	Fuhua Secondary
17:00 UTC+8	og'; Nurisyam Kamilan		Syafie Mkhtr; Audi Iswadi

20 Oct 2024 27	Tanah Merah United	5-1	Verde Cresta Combined	East Spring Secondary
15:00 UTC+8	Syafiq Karim; Iswandi Shahrin; Nazif Iskandar		Muhaimin

20 Oct 2024 28	Sembawang Park	1-6	Westwood El'Junior	Fuhua Secondary
19:00 UTC+8	Ryan		Shafiq; Salihin; Muazzam; Fandi; Sheikh; Elfy	Player of the Match: Elfy

26 Oct 2024 33	Verde Cresta Combined	2-2	Tanah Merah United	Mayflower Secondary
17:00 UTC+8	Zayyan; Rinesh

26 Oct 2024 34	Westwood El'Junior	3-2	Sembawang Park	Fuhua Secondary
17:00 UTC+8	Fandi; Shafiq; Shalihin		Andy; Jefrez	Player of the Match: Muazzam

3 Nov 2024 45	Tanah Merah United	4-1	Sembawang Park	Westwood Secondary
15:00 UTC+8

3 Nov 2024 46	Verde Cresta Combined	1-3	Westwood El'Junior	Westwood Secondary
17:00 UTC+8	Affiq		Haqim; Hafiqal	Player of the Match: Aqim

10 Nov 2024 59	Sembawang Park	5-7	Verde Cresta Combined	East Spring Secondary
17:00 UTC+8			Muhaimin; Hazim; Nurisyam; Danial

10 Nov 2024 60	Westwood El'Junior	P-P	Tanah Merah United	Bedok South Secondary
17:00 UTC+8
Note: M60 – Westwood El’Junior FC vs Tanah Merah United FC abandoned due to inclement weather

13 Nov 2024 60*	Westwood El'Junior	2-0	Tanah Merah United	Choa Chu Kang
19:45 UTC+8	Hafiqal; Shafiq			Stadium: Choa Chu Kang Stadium; Player of the Match: Shafiq
Note: M60 – Rescheduled match

=== Group D ===
Pos	Team	Pld	W	D	L	GF	GA	GD	Pts
1	GDT Circuit FC (Q)	6	5	0	1	27	6	+21	15
2	East Coast United (Q)	6	4	0	2	28	14	+14	12
3	Geylang Serai FC	6	2	0	4	13	19	−6	6
4	Bukit Timah FC	6	1	0	5	8	37	−29	3

Updated to match(es) played on 10 Nov 2024. Source: fas.org.sg
Rules for classification: 1) points; 2) goal difference; 3) number of goals scored; 4) number of wins
(Q) Qualified for Quarter-finals

6 Oct 2024 7	Bukit Timah	2-4	East Coast United	Manjusri Secondary
17:00 UTC+8	Izam; Ali			Player of the Match: Izam

6 Oct 2024 8	Geylang Serai	1-5	GDT Circuit	East Spring Secondary
17:00 UTC+8			Basit Hamid; Jumari Semin; Khairul Nizam; Ruhaizad Ismail

12 Oct 2024 13	East Coast United	3-1	Geylang Serai	East Spring Secondary
15:00 UTC+8

12 Oct 2024 14	GDT Circuit	7-0	Bukit Timah	Westwood Secondary
17:00 UTC+8	Syed Hafiz; Basit Hamid; Rain Akif; Taufiq Hidayat; Khairul Nizam			Player of the Match: Shahril (BTFC)

20 Oct 2024 27	East Coast United	4-2	GDT Circuit	Manjusri Secondary
17:00 UTC+8

20 Oct 2024 28	Bukit Timah	2-1	Geylang Serai	Bartley Secondary
17:00 UTC+8	Ali			Player of the Match: Iskandar (Rio)

27 Oct 2024 35	GDT Circuit	6-0	East Coast United	Westwood Secondary
15:00 UTC+8

27 Oct 2024 36	Geylang Serai	6-4	Bukit Timah	East Spring Secondary
17:00 UTC+8

2 Nov 2024 41	East Coast United	15-0	Bukit Timah	Woodgrove Secondary
15:00 UTC+8

2 Nov 2024 42	GDT Circuit	3-1	Geylang Serai	Westwood Secondary
17:00 UTC+8

10 Nov 2024 57	Bukit Timah	0-4	GDT Circuit	Fuhua Secondary
15:00 UTC+8

10 Nov 2024 58	Geylang Serai	3-2	East Coast United	Fuhua Secondary
17:00 UTC+8

=== Group E ===
Pos	Team	Pld	W	D	L	GF	GA	GD	Pts
1	Eastern Thunder FC (Q)	6	4	1	1	17	9	+8	13
2	Winchester Isla FC	6	3	1	2	14	12	+2	10
3	Jungfrau Punggol FC 'B'	6	2	1	3	10	13	−3	7
4	Woodlands Rangers FC	6	1	1	4	12	19	−7	4

Updated to match(es) played on 10 Nov 2024. Source: fas.org.sg
Rules for classification: 1) points; 2) goal difference; 3) number of goals scored; 4) number of wins
(Q) Qualified for Quarter-finals

6 Oct 2024 9	Winchester Isla	4-3	Jungfrau Punggol 'B'	Bartley Secondary
17:00 UTC+8			Adam Norkhalis; Shaun Sanjiv; Daniel Tan

6 Oct 2024 10	Eastern Thunder	3-1	Woodlands Rangers	Bedok South Secondary
17:00 UTC+8	Hamza Gharfane 80'; Thomas Kong 86'	Report	Su'Aidi 76'

13 Oct 2024 19	Jungfrau Punggol 'B'	0-3	Eastern Thunder	Serangoon Garden Sec
17:00 UTC+8		Report	Thomas Kong 17'; Hamza Gharfane 44' 76'

13 Oct 2024 20	Woodlands Rangers	3-0	Winchester Isla	Fuhua Secondary
17:00 UTC+8	Razip; Quffizan

19 Oct 2024 23	Winchester Isla	1-1	Eastern Thunder	East Spring Secondary
15:00 UTC+8			Max Anthony

19 Oct 2024 24	Jungfrau Punggol 'B'	P-P	Woodlands Rangers	Mayflower Secondary
17:00 UTC+8
Note: Jungfrau Punggol FC ‘B’ vs Woodlands Rangers FC was abandoned due to inclement weather

27 Oct 2024 39	Woodlands Rangers	2-2	Jungfrau Punggol 'B'	Fuhua Secondary
17:00 UTC+8			Abbas; Winfred

27 Oct 2024 40	Eastern Thunder	4-2	Winchester Isla	Manjusri Secondary
17:00 UTC+8

30 Oct 2024 24*	Jungfrau Punggol 'B'	3-2	Woodlands Rangers	Mayflower Secondary
17:00 UTC+8	Adam; Marcus
Note: M24 - Rescheduled Match

2 Nov 2024 43	Jungfrau Punggol 'B'	0-1	Winchester Isla	East Spring Secondary
15:00 UTC+8

2 Nov 2024 44	Woodlands Rangers	3-5	Eastern Thunder	Woodgrove Secondary
17:00 UTC+8

10 Nov 2024 55	Winchester Isla	6-1	Woodlands Rangers	Westwood Secondary
15:00 UTC+8

10 Nov 2024 56	Eastern Thunder	P-P	Jungfrau Punggol 'B'	Westwood Secondary
17:00 UTC+8
Note: M56 – Eastern Thunder FC vs Jungfrau Punggol FC ‘B’ abandoned due to inclement weather

13 Nov 2024 56*	Eastern Thunder	1-2	Jungfrau Punggol 'B'	Bukit Gombak Stadium
19:45 UTC+8			Adam Norkhalis
Note: M56 – Rescheduled match

== Knock-out Stage ==
=== Quarter Finals ===
17 Nov 2024 QF1	Westwood El'Junior	2-1	Tanah Merah United	Bukit Gombak
15:00 UTC+8	Fandi; Sheikh		Irfan Jeff	Stadium: Bukit Gombak Stadium; Player of the Match: Muazzam

19 Nov 2024 QF2	Gymkhana FC	3-1	Balestier United	Punggol
				Stadium: Punggol Secondary
Note: The match has been rescheduled from 17 Nov to 19 Nov 2024

20 Nov 2024 QF3	GDT Circuit	4-1	East Coast United	Serangoon
19:45 UTC+8	Khairul Nizam; Jumari Semin			Stadium: Serangoon Garden Sec; Player of the Match: Khairul Nizam
Note: The match was rescheduled from 17 Nov to 20 Nov 2024.

17 Nov 2024 QF4	Singapore Xin Hua	1-2	Eastern Thunder	Serangoon
17:00 UTC+8			Xavier; Thomas 55'	Stadium: Serangoon Garden Sec

=== Semi Finals ===
24 Nov 2024 SF1	Westwood El'Junior	3-1	Eastern Thunder	Choa Chu Kang
17:00 UTC+8	Shalihin; Haqim; Fandi		Thomas	Stadium: Choa Chu Kang Stadium

24 Nov 2024 SF2	Gymkhana FC	0-3	GDT Circuit	Choa Chu Kang
19:00 UTC+8			Ifran Asrul	Stadium: Choa Chu Kang Stadium; Player of the Match: Ifran Asrul

=== Final ===
1 Dec 2024 Final	Westwood El'Junior	1-2	GDT Circuit	Jalan Besar
19:00 UTC+8		Report	Zuhaili Suib	Stadium: Jalan Besar Stadium

== Awards ==
=== Top scorers ===
Updated on 20 Nov 2024

Rank	Player	Club	Goals
1	Danish Harith	East Coast United FC	11
1	Khairul Nizam	GDT Circuit FC	11
2	Hamza Gharfane	Eastern Thunder FC	8

Source: fas.org.sg

== See also ==
- Football in Singapore
- Football Association of Singapore
- 2024-25 Singapore Premier League
- 2024 Singapore Football League
