= Shareef (given name) =

Shareef is a masculine given name of Arabic origin. Notable people with the name include:

== Given name ==
- Shareef Abdelhaleem (born 1976), Egyptian terrorist
- Shareef Abdul-Kadhim (born 1996), Iraqi footballer
- Shareef Abdur-Rahim (born 1976), American basketball executive and former player
- Shareef Adnan (born 1984), Jordanian footballer
- Shareef Cousin (born 1979), American wrongfully convicted of murder
- Shareef Dancer (1980–1999), American-bred, British-trained Thoroughbred racehorse
- Shareef Keouf (born 2001), Israeli footballer
- Shareef Miller (born 1997), American football player
- Shareef O'Neal (born 2000), American basketball player
- Shareef Sarhan (born 1976) Palestinian visual artist, photographer, designer; founder of Shababeek for Contemporary Art (Windows From Gaza)
- Shareef Zandani (1098–1215), Indian Sufi saint

== See also ==
- Shareef (surname)
- Sherif, given name and surname
