= Sherriff =

Sherriff is a surname, and may refer to:

- Aron Sherriff (born 1985), Australian lawn and indoor bowler
- Carol Sherriff (born 1946), Australian tennis player
- Casey Sherriff (born 1998), Australian rules footballer
- Frederick Sherriff (fencer) (1889–1943), British military officer and fencer
- Frederick Sherriff (tennis) (born 1943), Australian tennis player
- George Sherriff (1898–1967), Scottish explorer and plant collector
- George Sherriff (rugby union) (born 1937), English rugby union footballer
- Kirk E. Sherriff (born 1968), American lawyer and judge
- Paula Sherriff, British politician, Member of Parliament for Dewsbury 2015–2019
- R. C. Sherriff (1896–1975), English writer, novelist and playwright
- Rowan Sherriff (born 1951), Australian cricketer
- Ryan Sherriff (born 1990), American baseball player
- Shane Cansdell-Sherriff (born 1982), Australian soccer player

== See also ==
- Sheriff (surname)
