= Shariff Abdul Samat =

Singaporean footballer

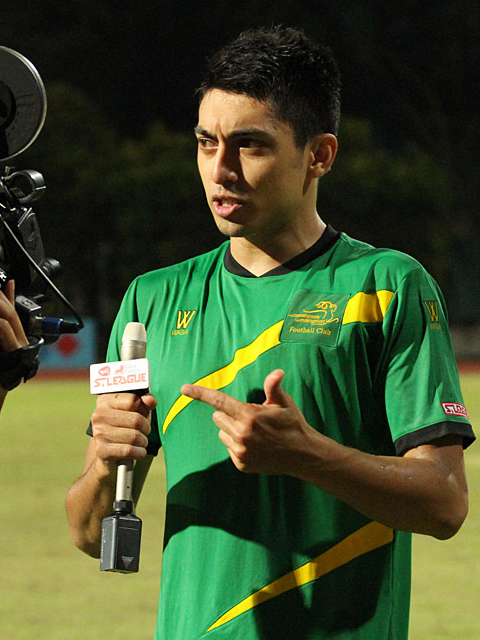
- Shariff speaking with the press after Woodlands Wellington's match against Home United on 5 March 2013.

Personal information
- Full name: Muhammad Shariff bin Abdul Samat
- Date of birth: 5 January 1984
- Place of birth: Singapore
- Date of death: 10 February 2020 (aged 36)
- Height: 1.81 m (5 ft 11 in)
- Position: Centre-back

Senior career*
Years	Team	Apps	(Gls)
2003	Sembawang Rangers	17	(0)
2005	Home United	1	(0)
2006	Young Lions	11	(0)
2007–2009	Tampines Rovers	70	(1)
2010	Home United	13	(0)
2011	Hougang United	22	(0)
2012	Admiralty	8	(2)
2012	Tampines Rovers	0	(0)
2013	Woodlands Wellington	11	(0)
2014–2015	Tampines Rovers		
2016	Geylang International		

International career^{‡}
2013	Singapore	1	(0)
- * Club domestic league appearances and goals as of 16 July 2013 ‡ National team caps and goals as of 4 June 2013

Muhammad Shariff bin Abdul Samat (5 January 1984 – 10 February 2020) was a Singaporean international footballer.

Shariff is the son of former Singaporean international Samad Allapitchay and like his father, he usually played as a centre-back.

Shariff was also known as a hot-tempered player, and was once handed out an eight-month ban by the Football Association of Singapore for throwing a punch at a Geylang United player, Peter Bennett during a S.League match when he was playing for Sembawang Rangers in 2003.

== Playing career ==
Shariff previously played for S.League clubs Sembawang Rangers, Young Lions and Tampines Rovers.

Shariff was brought into the Tampines Rovers squad from the Young Lions after a stint with Sembawang Rangers, largely as a back-up player for the 2007 highlighting season. However, due to his teammate Sead Muratović's failure to pass the annual fitness test, Shariff became a major part of the first team's fixture in the S.League. Shariff then joined Home United in 2010.

Shariff spent half a season in the NFL Division 2 side Admiralty during the first half of 2012, and it was announced that he would rejoin S.League side Tampines Rovers for the second half of their 2012 season. However, he failed to break into the squad and was released at the end of the season.

On 2 February 2013, Shariff was unveiled as a Woodlands Wellington player during the team's pre-season fanfare after spending the entire 2012 in a semi-professional league. Shariff made his debut for the club on 5 March 2013 in an away game against his former club, Home United. Shariff put in an outstanding performance against opponent, his clearance off the line of Masato Fukui's shot being heralded as the turning point of the game by Woodlands coach, Salim Moin, during the post-match conference.

Shariff than rejoined Tampines for the 2014 season but was not retained for the 2015 season and played for another NFL side Singapore Recreation Club that year. He then was signed by Geylang International for the 2016 season, but was released at the end of the season.

== International career ==
In 2008, under Radojko Avramović, Shariff was called up for matches against North Korea, Saudi Arabia, Australia and the United Arab Emirates. However, he did not play in all of them.

In 2013, Shariff was called up by Bernd Stange because of his impressive performances for Woodlands Wellington in the S.League. He made his international debut on 4 June 2013, coming on as a substitute against Myanmar in a friendly match in Yangon.

== Personal life and death ==
On 31 May 2001, Shariff, then 17 years old, encountered the 8-member gang 369, known as Salakau, who attacked him and his two other friends while they were walking along South Bridge Road, having mistook them as members of rival gang Sakongsa (303). The gang killed one of his friends, then-17-year-old Sulaiman bin Hashim, who Shariff was close to. Despite being stabbed on the back, Shariff managed to escape to the nearest police station with his other friend (another footballer, Mohammed Imran bin Mohammed Ali) to inform the police. He was hospitalised and later discharged on 2 June 2001. Six of the attackers were eventually arrested, jailed and caned for rioting and culpable homicide, but the remaining two assailants remain at large till this day. The case was re-enacted in local crime show True Files, which features the death of Sulaiman and the murder trial of the Salakau gang members. Shariff was portrayed by actor A.L. Imran and addressed solely by his given name to protect his real identity.

On 10 November 2015, Shariff assaulted his brother-in-law and later pleaded guilty to voluntarily causing hurt. On 24 May 2016, he was sentenced to 2 weeks' imprisonment. The crime he was found guilty of would have led to him jailed up to two years and fined $5,000.

On 10 February 2020, Shariff died of a heart attack at the age of 36.

== Career statistics ==
=== Club ===
As of 16 July 2013

Shariff Abdul Samat's Profile

Club Performance		League		Cup		League Cup		Total				
Singapore		S.League		Singapore Cup		League Cup		Total				
Club	Season	Apps	Goals	Apps	Goals	Apps	Goals	Yellow card	(yellow card) (yellow-red card)	Red card	Apps	Goals
Tampines Rovers	2009	24 (2)	1	0	0	0	0	4	1	0	24 (2)	1
Home United	2010	12 (1)	0	0	0	0	0	5	0	0	12 (1)	0
Hougang United	2011	22	0	0	0	0	0	9	1	0	22	0
Singapore		NFL Division 2		Singapore FA Cup								
Club	Season	Apps	Goals	Apps	Goals	-	-	Yellow card	(yellow card) (yellow-red card)	Red card	Apps	Goals
Admiralty FC	2012	8	2	0	0	-	-	0	0	0	8	2
Singapore		S.League		Singapore Cup		League Cup						
Club	Season	Apps	Goals	Apps	Goals	Apps	Goals	Yellow card	(yellow card) (yellow-red card)	Red card	Apps	Goals
Tampines Rovers	2012	0	0	0	0	0	0	0	0	0	0	0
Woodlands Wellington	2013	11	0	1	0	2	0	2	0	1	14	0

All numbers encased in brackets signify substitute appearances.

=== International appearances ===
#	Date	Venue	Opponent	Result	Competition
1.	4 June 2013	Thuwunna Stadium, Yangon, Myanmar	Myanmar	2–0	International Friendly
Updated as of 4 June 2013.

== Honours ==
=== Individual ===
- S.League Young Player of the Year: 2007
