= Manar al-Sharif =

Syrian-Palestinian journalist and peace activist

Manar Al-Sharif
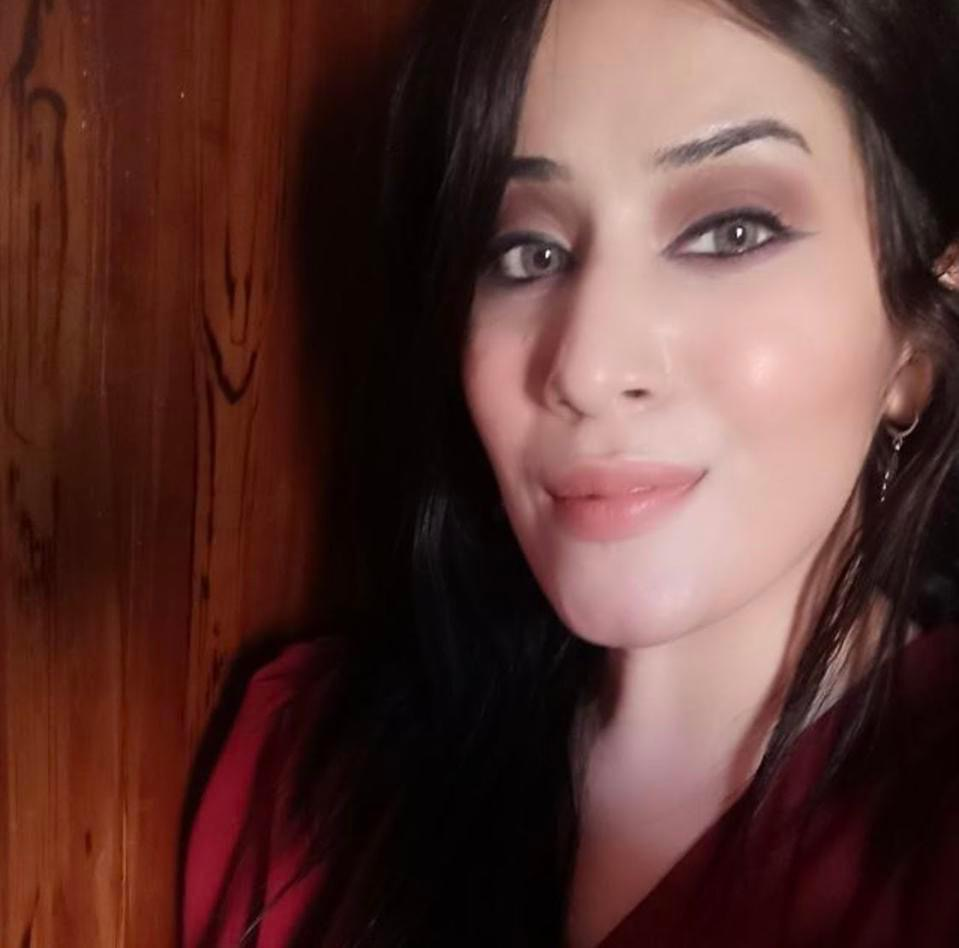
- Born: 1997 or 1998; Damascus, Syria

Manar al-Sharif (born 1997/1998, Damascus) is a Syrian Palestinian journalist and peace activist.

== Early life and education ==
Al-Sharif was born and raised in a devout Muslim family in Damascus, Syria. She and her family moved to Cairo, Egypt , in 2013, due to the Syrian civil war. Al-Sharif wanted to attend college, but her conservative religious parents were reluctant to allow her to. They eventually gave permission for al-Sharif to study at the Islamic University of Gaza. Al-Sharif traveled to Gaza in 2017 to study journalism at the university, but she dropped out after a few months, citing the “Hamas propaganda” at the school, saying "It wasn’t professional and it wasn’t journalism".

== Career ==
Al-Sharif first began writing for American, Australian, and Israeli publications. She primarily wrote about life in the Gaza Strip, particularly the struggles faced by young people, women, and children.

In 2018, Al-Sharif also became involved with the Gaza Youth Committee, and later became part of its leadership.

In 2019, Al-Sharif, with the Gaza Youth Committee, organized two bicycle races to bring attention to the struggles of the Gazan population and as a way to provide safe recreation to Gazan youth.

Also in 2019, Al-Sharif spent two nights in jail after being arrested for holding an event at her home with both men and women as guests.

In April 2020, Al-Sharif was arrested after advertising a Zoom event called "Skype with your enemy" that included Israeli speakers; several of the event planners were also arrested. She went on to spend three months in a women's prison. She spent some of this time in solitary confinement, and went on a two-week hunger strike to protest the prison conditions. She was released on bail in June 2020. After her release, she returned to Cairo in October before moving to the UAE.
