= Shareef (surname) =

Shareef' is a surname. Notable people with the name include:

- Abdulaziz Shareef (born 1993), Qatari footballer
- Adam Shareef, Maldivian politician
- Ali Shareef (born 1979), Maldivian track and field sprint athlete
- Aminath Shareef, Maldivian film actress
- Asad Shareef (born 1964), Maldivian film actor and politician
- Derrick Shareef, American terrorist
- Easa Shareef, Maldivian film director, actor, screen-writer, editor and lyricist
- Hussain Shareef (born 1998), Maldivian footballer
- Hussain Shareef (judoka), Kuwaiti judoka
- Ibrahim Labaan Shareef (born 1996), Maldivian footballer
- Jay Shareef (born 1982), British stand-up comedian and broadcaster
- K. S. G. Haja Shareef, Indian politician
- Mizna Shareef, Maldivian politician
- Shamau Shareef (born 1983), Maldivian politician
- Shidhatha Shareef, Maldivian politician
- Umer Shareef (1955–2021), Pakistani actor, comedian and television personality
- Zahid Shareef (born 1967), Pakistani hockey player

== See also ==
- Shareef (given name)
- Sherif, given name and surname
