= Sharifism =

Nobility system in Morocco

Sharifism was the system in pre-colonial Morocco in which the shurafā—descendants of the Islamic prophet Muhammad (through his grandson Hasan ibn Ali, in the case of Morocco)—held a privileged religious and political position in society. Those who claimed this lineage were regarded as a kind of nobility and were privileged, in the words of Sahar Bazzaz, "as political agents, as interlocutors between various sectors of society, and as would be dynasts of Morocco". They were additionally believed to possess baraka, or blessing power. Claiming this lineage also served to justify authority; the Idrisi dynasty (788–974), the Saadi dynasty (1510–1659), and the 'Alawi dynasty (1631–present) all claimed lineage from Ahl al-Bayt.

== History ==
The shurafā' surfaced in the Marinid period as a loosely defined group with social and political privilege, gaining political prestige through their involvement in the jihad resistance to Iberian Catholic invasions in the 15th century. Under Sharifism, the shurafā' came to be venerated as saints—awliā' sāliḥīn (أولياء صالحين "righteous authorities")—by all social classes in Morocco. Sharifism manifested itself in Mawlid celebrations, claims of possessing prophetic relics, a new hagiographic tradition, and traditions of ziyara to the tombs and the zawiyas of the shurafā', which were considered "sacred and inviolable", and offered sanctuary (حُرم ḥurm) from the Makhzen.

Sufi teachings associated with Muhammad al-Jazuli supported the idea of the authority of the shurafā'. These teachings were rooted in the concept of tajdid (تجديد "renewal"), based on the prophetic teaching "God will send to this community at the turn of every century someone who will restore religion." Al-Jazuli and his followers saw the awliā' sāliḥīn as models of spiritual and social virtue.

The Saadi dynasty revived Sharifism in the 16th century to assert Arab supremacy in a mostly Amazigh region. At this time, it competed with and eventually marginalized Sufism to become the main channel of legitimacy and power. It became particularly important in the "Maraboutic Crisis", referring to the power struggles involving Sufi zawiyas or ribats following the end of the powerful Amazigh dynasties (the Almoravids, the Almohads, and the Marinids), which intensified after the death of Ahmad al-Mansur, when his sons Zidan Abu Maali and Abu Faris Abdallah fought for the throne. Under the Saadi dynasty, the armed Sufi ribats represented a challenge to the Makhzen's authority. The Saadis sought to absorb the authority of the Sufis by taking over jihad. They even dug up Muhammad al-Jazuli's body and buried it in a mausoleum in Marrakesh.

The Alawite dynasty from Tafilalt rose to power through its own claims of prophetic lineage as well as its alliances with shurafā' families in Fes, especially the Idrisid family, descendants of the founder of Fes, Idris II. Beginning during the reign of Sultan Ismail (1672–1727), the Makhzen began to officially document and verify lineages, restricting the number of families that could receive tax cuts and other benefits on the basis of their sharīfī lineage.

=== Pre-colonial period ===
Edmund Burke III described Sharifism as "central to Moroccan politics" in the precolonial period. Prestige, influence, and power in Moroccan society were based on lineage rather than wealth, and families of sharīfī descent were, according to Sahar Bazzaz, "more likely to gain wealth as a result of their noble descent or through access to the patron-client networks of these sharifan families". Examples of Sharifism in the pre-colonial period include the vast land holdings north of Fes of the shurafā' of Wazzān, the rebellions against the Makhzen led by the sheikhs of the Sharqāwi Sufi order, and the campaign of the pretender al-Jilāli az-Zarhūni.

==== 19th century changes ====
The 19th century saw the rise of a new merchant class with unprecedented political influence. This new commercial elite began to supplant traditional hierarchies based on sharīfī lineage, gaining power and prestige through its ties with European trading companies and knowledge of European languages and modern governing, economic, and business models, of great value to the Makhzen. In 1830, for example, after the French invasion of Algiers, a group of merchants from Fes convinced Sultan Abd al-Rahman not to end relations with France, as their commercial interests in Algeria were too important to be threatened by political conflict. After the Anglo-Moroccan Treaty of 1856 and later treaties with France and Spain, Moroccan merchants—Muslims and Jews alike—flourished. From the mid-19th century, Moroccan merchants joined the bureaucracy of the Makhzen, which was expanding to facilitate relations with Europe, in roles as tariff-inspectors or the umanā' established by Muhammad IV.
