= Urmia University of Technology =

Public state-funded university in Urmia, Iran

Coordinates: 37.6522°N 44.9795°E

- دانشگاه صنعتی ارومیه; Dāneshgāh-e San'ati-ye urmia
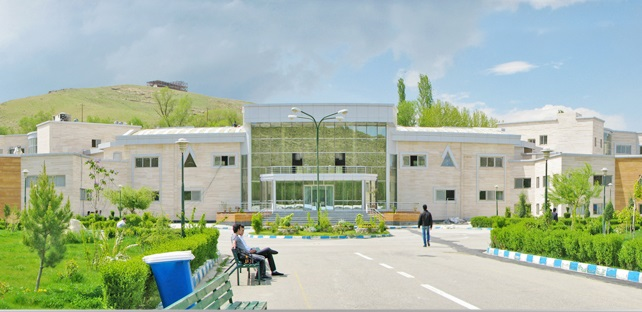
- Type: Public
- Established: 2007
- President: Yaghuob Poorasad
- Faculty: 100
- Location: Urmia, West Azerbaijan, Iran
- Campus: Urban
- Website: www.uut.ac.ir

Urmia University of Technology is a public, state-funded university in Urmia, Iran, which was founded in 2007 and focuses on technology, specifically information technology, and mechanical and industrial engineering.
