= Noor Ali (footballer) =

Singaporean footballer and coach

Mohd Noor Ali
Personal information
- Date of birth: 16 May 1975 (age 51)
- Place of birth: Singapore
- Height: 1.70 m (5 ft 7 in)
- Positions: Midfielder; forward

Team information
- Current team: Geylang International FC (head coach)

Senior career*
Years	Team	Apps	(Gls)
1999	Tampines Rovers	0	(0)
2000–2004	Geylang United	98	(42)
2005–2007	Singapore Armed Forces	83	(20)
2008–2009	Geylang United	63	(10)
2010–2011	Woodlands Wellington		
2011	Hougang United		
2012	Admiralty		
2013	Geylang International		
2014	Yishun Sentek Mariners	0	(0)

International career
1998–2004	Singapore	45	(7)

Managerial career
- 2017: Geylang International
- 2018: Matsumoto Yamaga U18
- 2019–: Geylang International
- * Club domestic league appearances and goals

Mohd Noor Ali is a Singapore former footballer where he used to represents the Singapore national team. He is currently the head coach of Singapore Premier League club Geylang International.

== Playing career ==
=== Club career ===
Throughout his career, Noor Ali played as a midfielder or winger for Tampines Rovers, Geylang United, SAFFC, Woodlands Wellington and Hougang United in the S.League, as well as Admiralty in the NFL Division 2 before hanging up his boots. He returned to club action for Geylang International in the 2013 season during an injury crisis in the 2nd half of the season at the age of 38.

Noor Ali helped mastermind one of the greatest shock in Singapore league history when he aided Geylang United to the 2001 S.League title. However, the season ended in disaster when they were thrashed 8–0 by Home United in the 2001 Singapore Cup final, a match in which Noor Ali was sent off. During this time he started a partnership with Aleksandar Đurić when they played together for Geylang United and SAFFC.

On 5 February 2003, Noor Ali was detained by the Corrupt Practices Investigation Bureau for investigations. Noor Ali admitted to betting on two matches but denied passing information on match results to friends. He was then suspended by the Football Association of Singapore (FAS) for breaching the S-League Players' Code of Conduct. After a disciplinary hearing with the FAS, Noor Ali was banned for 12 months, backdated to February.

Noor Ali captained SAFFC to their 5th and 6th league title in 2006 and 2007, despite losing the last match of the season to former club Geylang United.

==== Geylang United ====
In 2008, Noor Ali was signed by Geylang United.

Noor Ali won the Singapore Cup in 2009 while playing for Geylang United.

=== International career ===
Noor Ali made his international debut for Singapore on 28 March 1998 where he scored on his debut in a 3–0 win over Cambodia during the 1998 AFF Championship qualification. He was part of the Singapore squad that won the 1998 AFF Championship.

In total, he made 36 appearances for the Lions.

== Coaching career ==
=== Geylang International ===
Noor Ali became the assistant coach for Geylang International for the 2017 S.League season under Hasrin Jailani however on 20 June 2017, Hasrin resigned and Noor Ali became the head coach for club until the end of the season. He guided Geylang International for a fourth-place finish in the 2017 S.League season. It was the first time since 14 years that they finished in the top 4 place.

=== Matsumoto Yamaga U18 ===
In January 2018, Noor Alileft Geylang International after he was sent to Matsumoto Yamaga for 10-month training stint to have a better experience in coaching. He was replaced by Hirotaka Usui. Noor Ali's stint in Japan proved to be a fruitful one as he guided the Matsumoto Yamaga U-18 ‘B’ team to the Takamado Cup JFA U-18 Football League 2018 Nagano Prefecture title. His side won 11 matches and lost only 3 while scoring 37 goals and only conceding 11 en route to the title.

=== Return to Geylang International ===
Noor Ali returned to his position at Geylang on 21 December 2018 after his Yamaga's stint.

== Personal life ==
Noor Ali's younger brother, Jamil Ali, is also a former professional footballer. He has four children, with both of his son, Ilhan Noor and Raiyan Noor also a footballer playing for Geylang International which Noor Ali coached.

In September 2022, Noor Ali was hospitalised for heart palpitations and discovered complications in his heart.

== International statistics ==
=== International goals ===
International goals by date, venue, cap, opponent, score, result and competition
No.	Date	Venue	Opponent	Score	Result	Competition
1	28 March 1998	Jurong Stadium, Jurong, Singapore	Cambodia	3–0	3–0	1998 AFF Championship qualification
2	31 July 1999	Stadium Merdeka, Kuala Lumpur, Malaysia	Malaysia	2–1	2–1	1999 SEA Games
3	9 October 1997	Centro Desportivo Olímpico - Estádio, Taipa, Macau	Brunei	1–0	1–0	2000 AFC Asian Cup qualification
4	9 February 2001	Singapore National Stadium, Kallang, Singapore	Bahrain	1–2	1–2	2002 FIFA World Cup qualification
5	9 April 2002	Bishan Stadium, Bishan, Singapore	Maldives	2–0	2–0	Friendly
6	20 December 2002	Singapore National Stadium, Kallang, Singapore	Laos	2–1	2–1	2002 AFF Championship
7	22 December 2002	Singapore National Stadium, Kallang, Singapore	Thailand	1–1	2–1	2002 AFF Championship

== Honours ==
=== Club ===
==== SAFFC ====
- S.League: 2006, 2007
- Singapore Cup: 2007

==== Geylang United ====
- S.League: 2001
- Singapore Cup: 2009

=== International ===
==== Singapore ====
- AFF Championship: 1998

=== As Manager ===
==== Matsumoto Yamaga U18 ====
- Takamado Cup JFA U-18 Football League Nagano Prefecture: 2018
