= Sharif =

Descendant from the family of Muhammad

Sharīf or Sherif (Arabic: شريف, 'noble', 'highborn'), also spelled shareef, feminine sharīfa (شريفة), plural ashrāf (أشراف), shurafāʾ (شرفاء), or (in the Maghreb) shurfāʾ, is a title used to designate a person descended, or claiming to be descended, from the family of the Islamic prophet Muhammad (c. 570 CE – 632 CE). It may be used in three senses:

1. In the broadest sense, it refers to any descendant of Muhammad's great-grandfather Hashim (the Banu Hashim or Hashimites, already in Muhammad's day an established clan within the Meccan tribe of the Quraysh), including all descendants of Muhammad's paternal uncles Abu Talib (the Talibids) and al-Abbas (the Abbasids).
2. More often, it refers to a descendant of Ali, a son of Abu Talib and a paternal cousin of Muhammad (the Alids), especially but not exclusively through Ali's marriage with Muhammad's daughter Fatima (the Fatimids). In the sense of descendants of Fatima and Ali (the most common one), the term effectively refers to all descendants of Muhammad.
3. In the narrowest sense, it refers only to someone who descends from Fatima and Ali's eldest son (and Muhammad's grandson) Hasan (the Hasanids). In this limited context, it is contrasted with the term sayyid ('lord', 'master', plural sāda, (سادة), which then refers only to the descendants of Hasan's younger brother Husayn (the Husaynids).

The precise usage of the term has varied both historically and geographically.

== Etymology ==
The word derives from the Arabic root sh–r–f, which expresses meanings related to honor, nobility, and prominence. It has no etymological connection with the English term sheriff, which comes from the Old English word scīrgerefa, meaning "shire-reeve", referring to the local reeve (enforcement agent) of the king in the shire (county).

== Usage ==
=== History ===
Precise usage of the term has varied both historically and geographically. Often, the terms sharīf and sayyid were used interchangeably, while in other contexts they referred to Hasanid vs. Husaynid descent (especially in the Hejaz, where the Sharifate of Mecca was restricted to persons of Hasanid descent). In still other contexts, they both referred to some form of Hashimite descent, but were linked to a different and specific social status.

In most places, the term has functioned as a mark of nobility (both the Abbasids and the Fatimids were at one time holder of the caliphate), except in South Asia, where the meaning of the term has expanded to include all Muslims of foreign descent. Thus, in the caste system among South Asian Muslims, the term ashrāf designates not only Muslims of Arab descent (sayyids or purported descendants of Ali and Fatima, and shaykhs, which include all those who claim descent from the Quraysh or from one of Muhammad's companions), but also Muslims of Pasthun or Turko-Mongol (Mughal) descent.

Over time, people who were not of Hashimite descent were sometimes also granted the title sharīf as a general mark of nobility. The result of this has been that today the term sayyid has become a more common designation for those claiming descent from Muhammad. As such, Sayyid (or one of its many alternative spellings, like Sayyed or Syed) has also become a common proper name.

== Major sharif dynasties ==
- Abbasids (descendants of Muhammad's uncle Abbas ibn Abd al-Muttalib, ruled over a vast empire centered in Baghdad 750–945, and claimed the caliphate 750–1517)
- Idrisids (Hasanids, ruled over Morocco 789–985)
- Fatimids (Husaynids, ruled over a vast empire centered in Cairo and claimed the caliphate 909–1171)
- Sa'dids (Hasanids, ruled over Morocco 1510–1659)
- Alawids (Hasanids, rule over Morocco 1631–present)
- Hashimites (Hasanids, ruled over the Kingdom of Hejaz 1916–1925, the Arab Kingdom of Syria in 1920, the Kingdom of Iraq 1932–1958, and Jordan 1921–present)

== See also ==
- Asharaf or Ashraf, Somali clan claiming descent from Muhammad through Fatima
- List of Ashrāf tribes in Libya
- Sharif of Mecca
- Sharifate of Mecca
- Sharifian (disambiguation)
- Sharifism, term used for the rising prominence of the shurafāʾ in early modern Morocco
- Sherif or Sharif, a proper name derived from sharīf, including a list of people named that way
  - Omar Sharif (1932–2015), Egyptian actor and probably the most famous person with this name
