= Muhammad Taqi (referee) =

Singaporean football referee (born 1986)

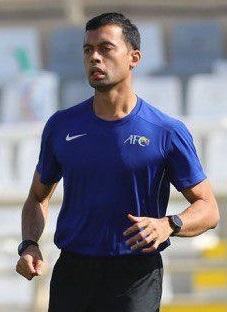
- Full name: Muhammad Taqi Al-Jaafari bin Jahari
- Born: 25 October 1986 (age 40); Singapore

Domestic
Years	League	Role
2006–	Singapore Premier League	Referee
2013, 2017, 2019, 2024	Chinese Super League	Referee
2016, 2018, 2020	Indian Super League	Referee
2025–	Indonesian Super League	Referee
2025–	UAE Pro League	Referee

International
Years	League	Role
2012–	FIFA listed	Referee

Muhammad Taqi Al-Jaafari bin Jahari (born 25 October 1986) is a Singaporean international football referee. He has been a FIFA listed referee since 2012, and has also refereed a number of AFC Champions League matches. He has also won the 2014 S.League Referee of the Year and the AFF Referee of the Year in 2017.

Internationally, Taqi refereed the matches in the 2017 FIFA U-17 World Cup, the 2019 FIFA U-20 World Cup, the 2018 AFC U-23 Championship, the 2019 AFC Asian Cup, the 2020 AFC U-23 Championship and the 2023 AFC Asian Cup.

While continentally, Taqi has also officiated in the finals of the 2012, 2014, and 2019 and 2024–25 Singapore Cup Final, the 2019 Indian Super League final, the 2019 J.League Cup / Copa Sudamericana Championship, the 2019 EAFF E-1 Football Championship, the 2026 Vietnamese Cup final, as well as matches in the Chinese Super League, Indian Super League, Indonesia Super League, and the Indonesia President's Cup.

Taqi was selected as a Video Assistant Referee at the 2022 FIFA World Cup and the 2023 FIFA Women's World Cup becoming the first Singaporean to officiate at both the men's and women's World Cup tournaments. He also was selected as the assistant VAR referee in the 2020 Olympic football final between Brazil and Spain.

Taqi is the fifth Singaporean referee to officiate at the FIFA World Cup after George Suppiah (1974), Shamsul Maidin (2006), K. Visvanathan (2002) and Jeffrey Goh (2010).

== Early life ==
Taqi's interest in football refereeing started when he accompanied his friends to take a refereeing course at 15-year-old at the National Stadium. He also failed his football trials with Clementi Khalsa but developed his interests for the Laws of the Game. After completing his O-levels, Taqi became a Class 3 referee and then promoted to a Class 2 referee to officiate in the Prime League matches when he was 19 in 2006. He was promoted to Class 1 referee the same year and officiated S.League matches in the professional association football league of Singapore.

== Refereeing career ==
Taqi officiated his first S.League match on 27 April 2006 between Geylang United and Balestier Khalsa in the 2006 S.League. Taqi became a FIFA-listed referee in 2012.

In February 2014, Taqi had a double in his career where he refereed the 2014 Singapore Charity Shield and the 2014 Singapore Cup Final. In the opening ceremony at the new Singapore National Stadium, Taqi refereed the first match on 16 August 2014 between Italian giants, Juventus and Singapore Selection which saw Juventus winning the match 5–0. In the same year, he was also awarded with S.League Referee of the Year.

In January 2015, Taqi was sent to Australia for being one of the support referees for the 2015 AFC Asian Cup in January with his assistant, Jeffrey Goh. In July 2015, he refereed in the 2015 Premier League Asia Trophy between Stoke City and Singapore Selection where Stoke City won 2–0.

In May 2017, Taqi was a video assistant referee (VAR) for the 2017 FIFA U-20 World Cup In South Korea. On 25 July 2017, he officiated the 2017 International Champions Cup match in Singapore between English champions Chelsea and German champions Bayern Munich. Bayern won the match 3–2. In October 2017,

Taqi was sent to India to officiate 2 group stage matches in the 2017 FIFA U-17 World Cup. On 26 November 2017, Taqi officiated the 2017 Singapore Cup Final between Albirex Niigata (S) and Global Cebu. Taqi was named 2017 AFF Referee of the Year.

On 30 July 2018, Taqi officiated the 2018 International Champions Cup match between Paris Saint-Germain and Atletico Madrid at the Singapore National Stadium in which PSG won the match 3–2.

In January 2019, Taqi was selected by AFC for the 2019 AFC Asian Cup held in the UAE to officiate some matches. He was sent to Poland to officiate some matches for the 2019 FIFA U-20 World Cup where he was the tournament match opening referee between Tahiti and Senegal on 23 May 2019 and on 30 May 2019, he also saw the tournament biggest ever win of 12–0 between Norway and Honduras where Erling Haaland scored nine goals in the match. On 7 August 2019, Taqi officiated in the 2019 J.League Cup / Copa Sudamericana Championship between Shonan Bellmare and Athletico Paranaense. During the Brazil Global Tour in Singapore. Taqi officiate the match between Brazil and Senegal on 10 October 2019.

In 2021, Taqi was Singapore's first FIFA video assistant referee (VAR) and officiated at the 2020 Summer Olympics held at Japan being the assistant VAR in the men's football final between Brazil and Spain.

On 15 July 2022, Taqi officiated the match between both English Premier League clubs, Liverpool and Crystal Palace at the Singapore National Stadium.

Taqi was also selected to officiate as a VAR for the 2022 FIFA World Cup and the 2023 FIFA Women's World Cup, making him the first Singaporean to officiate at both the men's and women's World Cup tournaments.

On 14 September 2023, the AFC announced that Taqi and 32 other referees were selected as referees for the 2023 AFC Asian Cup in Qatar. On 14 January 2024, he was selected to officiate a match between UAE and Hong Kong which UAE won the match 3–1. Taqi also saw Hong Kong midfielder Chan Siu Kwan who scored the 1,000th goal in the AFC Asian Cup history.

On 13 February 2024, Taqi was selected to officiate the opening 2023–24 AFC Champions League Round of 16 match between Shandong Taishan and Kawasaki Frontale.

Taqi was selected to officiate a match in the 2024–25 AFC Champions League Elite fixtures between Thailand club Buriram United and Japanese club Vissel Kobe on 17 September 2024 and also between Chinese club Shanghai Shenghua and Japanese club Kawasaki Frontale on 23 October 2024. Taqi was then selected to officiate the group stage fixture in the west region of the tournament between Emirati club Al Wasl and Qatari club Al Rayyan on 2 December.

In February 2025, Taqi was selected by Liga Indonesia Baru to officiate four matches in Liga 1. He officiate a league match on 21 February between Dewa United and Persebaya Surabaya, on 24 February between Arema and PSIS Semarang, on 11 April between Borneo Samarinda and Persib Bandung and then on 17 April between PSS Sleman and Dewa United.

On 31 May 2025, Taqi was selected to officiate the 2025 Singapore Cup final between Tampines Rovers and Lion City Sailors.

In July 2025, Taqi was appointed to officiate an international friendly match in the 2025 Indonesia President's Cup between English club Oxford United and the Liga Indonesia All Star team. The match was held at the Gelora Bung Karno Stadium in Jakarta on 6 July 2025 as part of the tournament's international showcase event.

In August 2025, Taqi was selected to officiate two matches in the Chinese Super League. He officiate a league match on 9 August in the Shanghai derby between Shanghai Shenghua and Shanghai Port where he also officiate on 30 August between Chengdu Rongcheng and Shanghai Port.

On 20 September 2025, Taqi was selected to officiate a match in the UAE Pro League between Al Nasr and Shabab Al Ahli.

On 14 June 2026, Taqi officiate the 2026 Vietnamese Cup final between Ninh Binh and Cong An Hồ Chí Minh City.

== Personal life ==
Taqi is married and has two sons and a daughter.

Taqi also received a Bachelor of Science degree whilst studying at the University of London in 2009.

== Notable matches ==
=== FIFA tournament ===
2017 FIFA U-17 World Cup – India
Date	Match	Location	Venue	Round
9 October 2017	Turkey – Mali	Navi Mumbai	Dr. DY Patil Stadium	Group stage
14 October 2017	France – Honduras	Guwahati	Indira Gandhi Athletic Stadium	Group stage

2019 FIFA U-20 World Cup – Poland
Date	Match	Location	Venue	Round
23 May 2019	Tahiti – Senegal	Lublin	Lublin Stadium	Group stage
30 May 2019	Norway – Honduras	Lublin	Lublin Stadium	Group stage

Video Assistant Referee (VAR)
2022 FIFA World Cup – Qatar
Date	Match	Location	Venue	Round
23 November 2022	Spain – Costa Rica	Doha	Al Thumama Stadium	Group stage
24 November 2022	Brazil – Serbia	Lusail	Lusail Stadium	Group stage
25 November 2022	Netherlands – Ecuador	Al Rayyan	Khalifa International Stadium	Group stage

Video Assistant Referee (VAR)
2023 FIFA Women's World Cup – Australia/New Zealand
Date	Match	Location	Venue	Round
24 July 2023	Germany – Morocco	Melbourne	Melbourne Rectangular Stadium	Group stage
26 July 2023	Spain – Zambia	Auckland	Eden Park	Group stage
1 August 2023	Haiti – Denmark	Perth	Perth Rectangular Stadium	Group stage
3 August 2023	South Korea – Germany	Brisbane	Lang Park	Group stage
8 August 2023	France – Morocco	Adelaide	Hindmarsh Stadium	Round of 16

=== AFC tournament ===
2019 AFC Asian Cup – United Arab Emirates
Date	Match	Location	Venue	Round
12 January 2019	Vietnam – Iran	Abu Dhabi	Al Nahyan Stadium	Group stage
22 January 2019	Qatar – Iraq	Abu Dhabi	Al Nahyan Stadium	Round of 16

2018 AFC U-23 Championship – China
Date	Match	Location	Venue	Round
12 January 2018	Uzbekistan – China	Changzhou	Changzhou Olympic Sports Centre	Group stage
23 January 2018	Qatar – Vietnam	Changzhou	Changzhou Olympic Sports Centre,	Semi-finals

2020 AFC U-23 Championship – Thailand
Date	Match	Location	Venue	Round
10 January 2020	Vietnam – United Arab Emirates	Buriram	Buriram Stadium	Group stage
15 January 2020	Qatar – Japan	Bangkok	Rajamangala Stadium,	Group stage

2023 AFC Asian Cup – Qatar
Date	Match	Location	Venue	Round
14 January 2024	United Arab Emirates – Hong Kong	Al Rayyan	Khalifa International Stadium	Group stage

=== Others notable matches ===
Date	Match	Venue	Location	Tournaments
28 October 2012	SAFFC – Tampines Rovers	Kallang, Singapore	Jalan Besar Stadium	2012 Singapore Cup Final
8 November 2013	Tampines Rovers – Home United	Kallang, Singapore	Jalan Besar Stadium	2014 Singapore Charity Shield
7 November 2014	Balestier Khalsa – Home United	Kallang, Singapore	Jalan Besar Stadium	2014 Singapore Cup Final
16 August 2014	Juventus – Singapore Selection	Kallang, Singapore	Singapore National Stadium	1st official match at the new Singapore National Stadium
18 July 2015	Stoke City – Singapore Selection	Kallang, Singapore	Singapore National Stadium	2015 Premier League Asia Trophy
25 July 2017	Chelsea – Bayern Munich	Kallang, Singapore	Singapore National Stadium	2017 International Champions Cup
30 July 2018	Paris Saint-Germain – Atletico Madrid	Kallang, Singapore	Singapore National Stadium	2018 International Champions Cup
11 September 2018	Japan – Costa Rica	Suita, Japan	Panasonic Stadium Suita	2018 Kirin Challenge Cup
17 March 2019	Bengaluru – FC Goa	Mumbai, India	Mumbai Football Arena	2019 Indian Super League final
7 August 2019	Shonan Bellmare – Athletico Paranaense.	Hiratsuka, Japan	Shonan BMW Stadium Hiratsuka	2019 J.League Cup / Copa Sudamericana Championship
19 August 2019	Dalian Yifang – Shanghai Greenland Shenhua	Dalian, China	Dalian Sports Center Stadium	2019 Chinese FA Cup Semi-finals
10 October 2019	Brazil – Senegal	Kallang, Singapore	Singapore National Stadium	2019 Brazil Global Tour
2 November 2019	Tampines Rovers – Warriors	Kallang, Singapore	Jalan Besar Stadium	2019 Singapore Cup Final
15 December 2019	South Korea – China	Busan, South Korea	Busan Asiad Main Stadium	2019 EAFF E-1 Football Championship
1 March 2020	Bengaluru – ATK	Bengaluru, India	Sree Kanteerava Stadium	2020 Indian Super League playoffs
22 September 2022	Thailand – Malaysia	Chiang Mai, Thailand	700th Anniversary Stadium	2022 King's Cup
25 September 2022	Trinidad and Tobago – Thailand	Chiang Mai, Thailand	700th Anniversary Stadium	2022 King's Cup
28 March 2023	Japan – Colombia	Osaka, Japan	Yodoko Sakura Stadium	2023 Kirin Challenge Cup
06 July 2025	Oxford United – Liga Indonesia All Star	Jakarta, Indonesia	Gelora Bung Karno Stadium	2025 Piala Presiden
14 June 2026	Ninh Binh – Cong An Hồ Chí Minh City	Ninh Bình, Vietnam	Ninh Bình Stadium	2026 Vietnamese Cup final

== Statistics ==
Statistics as main referee
Tournaments	Contester	Years	Matches	Yellow card	Red card
FIFA U-17 World Cup	FIFA	2017	2	6	0
FIFA U-20 World Cup	FIFA	2019	2	8	1
FIFA World Cup qualification (AFC)	FIFA	2015–	12	37	0
International Friendlies	FIFA	2016–	10	36	0
AFC Asian Cup	AFC	2019, 2023	3	11	0
AFC U-23 Championship	AFC	2018, 2020	4	18	1
AFC U-23 Championship qualification	AFC	2020	1	5	0
AFC Challenge Cup qualification	AFC	2014	2	6	0
AFC Champions League	AFC	2014–	37	141	0
AFC Champions League qualification	AFC	2015–	4	12	0
EAFF E-1 Football Championship	EAFF	2019	2	6	0
J.League Cup / Copa Sudamericana Championship	CONMEBOL – (Japan) JFA	2019	1	0	0
Singapore Premier League	(Singapore) FAS	2006–	222	932	20
Singapore Cup	(Singapore) FAS	2008–	31	137	2
Singapore League Cup	(Singapore) FAS	2012–2017	16	47	1
(China) Chinese Super League	(China) CFA	2013–2019	6	20	0
(China) Chinese FA Cup	(China) CFA	2019	1	2	0
China League Two play-offs	(China) CFA	2018	1	5	0
(India) Indian Super League	(India) AIFF	2016–2020	11	43	1
(India) Indian Super League play-offs	(India) AIFF	2019–2020	2	11	1
(Indonesia) Super League	(Indonesia) I-League	2025–	4	18	0
Indonesia President's Cup	(Indonesia) PSSI	2025	1	?	?
(United Arab Emirates) UAE Pro League	(United Arab Emirates) UAE Pro League Committee	2025–	1	9	0
Totals		2006–	386	1,550	27
Matches as referee are correct as of 6 July 2025

== Honours ==
- S. League Referee of the Year, 2014
- AFF Referee of the Year, 2017
