= 2017 Sultan of Selangor Cup =

Sultan of Selangor Cup
- Event: 2017 Sultan of Selangor Cup
Singapore Selection	Selangor Selection
FA Singapore	(Selangor) PKNS F.C.
3	2
- Date: 6 May 2017
- Venue: Singapore National Stadium, Kallang, Singapore

The 2017 Sultan of Selangor Cup was played on 6 May 2017, at Singapore National Stadium in Kallang, Singapore.

== Pre-match ==
On 22 November 2016, in a press conference at Football Association of Singapore headquarters at Jalan Besar Stadium, Sultan of Selangor Cup's chairman, Tan Sri Abdul Karim Munisar confirms that the next tournament will be held on 6 May at Singapore National Stadium. In the same press conference, he also announced that a new competition for youth under sixteen be introduced.

A special press conference for Sultan of Selangor Cup was held on 17 March in Singapore. During the conference, Tan Sri Abdul Karim announces that the Sultan of Selangor, His Royal Highness Sultan Sharafuddin Idris Shah had chosen PKNS F.C. to be Selangor's representative to the competition. The new trophy for the under sixteen competition was also introduced in the ceremony.

On 3 April, Sultan Sharafuddin Idris Shah receive sponsorship that amounts to RM1.06 mil from fourteen corporate body for the sixteenth edition of Sultan of Selangor Cup. In the event held at Istana Alam Shah, Klang, the Sultan receives sponsorship from seven GLC and seven private companies.

Sponsors	Amount (in RM)
Perbadanan Kemajuan Negeri Selangor (PKNS)	200,000
Permodalan Negeri Selangor Berhad (PNSB)	100,000
Selangor Treasury	100,000
KDEB Waste Management	55,555.55
Worldwide Holdings Berhad	50,000
Kumpulan Semesta Sdn Bhd	50,000
Menteri Besar Selangor Incorporated (MBI)	50,000
Kingsley Edugroup Berhad	100,000
Selangor Dredging Berhad	100,000
Splash Berhad	50,000
Taliwork Corporation Berhad	50,000
Eco World Development Group Berhad	50,000
SP Setia Berhad Group	50,000
Syarikat Yuwang Group	50,000

== Match ==
6 May 2017
20:15 UTC+8

Singapore Selection	3 - 2	Selangor Selection
Khairul Nizam 11'; Shakir Hamzah 43'; Faris Ramli 58' (pen.)		Safee Sali 63'; Gonzalo Soto 77'

Singapore National Stadium, Kallang
Attendance: 25,691

== Players ==
Singapore Selection	Selangor Selection

GK	18	Hassan Sunny
DF	9	Faritz Hameed
DF	20	Irfan Fandi	(substituted off) 65'
DF	13	Yasutaka Yanagi	(substituted off) 46'
DF	2	Shakir Hamzah
MF	14	Hariss Harun
MF		Kento Nagasaki
MF	4	Yasir Hanapi	(substituted off) 56'
MF	10	Faris Ramli	(substituted off) 87'
FW		Jordan Webb	(substituted off) 90'
FW		Khairul Nizam	(substituted off) 68'
Substitutes:
GK		Zaiful Nizam
DF	3	Afiq Yunos	(substituted on) 46'
FW	19	Khairul Amri	(substituted on) 56'
MF	17	Shahril Ishak (c)	(substituted on) 68'
FW	7	Gabriel Quak	(substituted on) 90'
MF	23	Zulfahmi Arifin	(substituted on) 65'
DF		Ho Wai Loon
MF	24	Hami Syahin	(substituted on) 87'
MF		Raihan Rahman
FW		Taufik Suparno
Coach:
Fandi Ahmad

GK	22	Zamir Selamat
DF	15	P. Gunalan
DF	24	Nizam Abu Bakar	(substituted off) 90'
DF	12	Gonzalo Soto
DF	3	Mohd Azmi Muslim	(substituted off) 56'
MF	5	Shahrul Azhar Ture	(substituted off) 66'
MF	13	Mohd Fauzan Dzulkifli
MF	6	Shim Un-seob	(substituted off) 40'
MF	11	Nazrin Syamsul Bahri	(substituted off) 86'
FW	10	Safee Sali (c)
FW	4	Patrick Wleh	(substituted off) 81'
Substitutes:
GK	1	G. Jeevananthan
DF	16	Azreen Zulkafli	(substituted on) 66'
MF	14	Khyril Muhymeen Zambri	(substituted on) 86'
FW	21	Lucas Espindola	(substituted on) 81'
MF	30	Matias Jadue	(substituted on) 40'
MF	23	Alif Haikal Sabri	(substituted on) 56'
FW	9	Bobby Gonzales	(substituted on) 90'
Coach:
E. Elavarasan

== Other matches ==
=== Veterans ===
6 May 2017
18:30 UTC+8

Singapore Veterans	0 - 0	Selangor Veterans

Singapore National Stadium, Kallang

=== School Challenge ===
6 May 2017
16:45 UTC+8

Singapore Sports School (U-16)	1 - 1	Selangor Combined Schools (U-16)
Penalties
	4 - 3

Singapore National Stadium, Kallang

== See also ==
- Singapore Selection XI
