= Peter Lim Charity Cup =

Singapore Olympic Foundation – Peter Lim Charity Cup
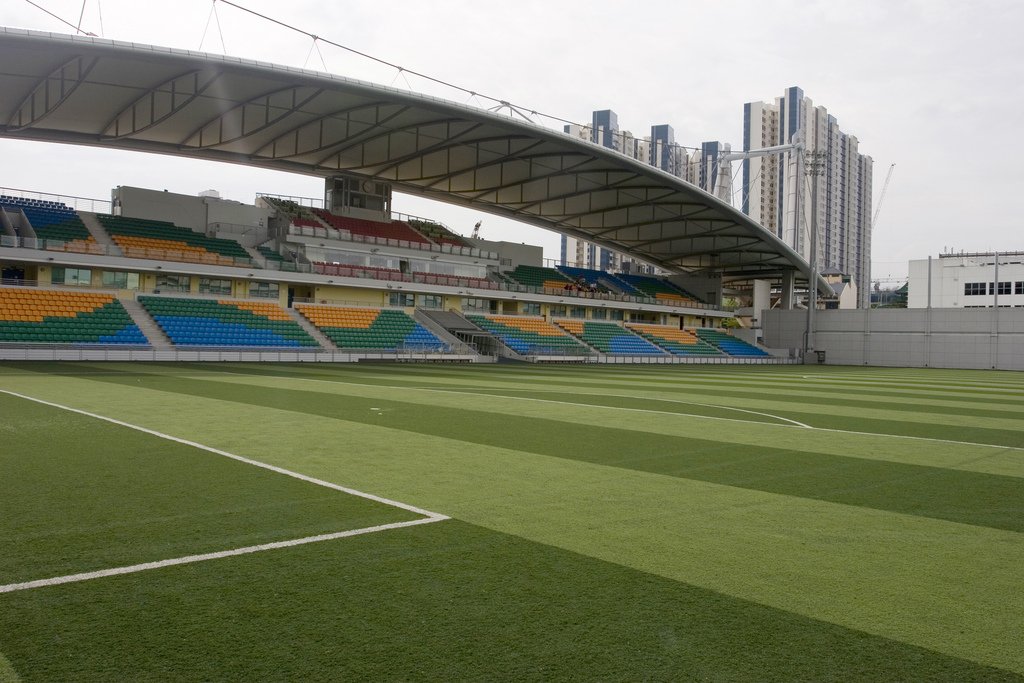
- Jalan Besar Stadium, where the Peter Lim Charity Cup was held.
- Event: Charity Match
Singapore Selection	Atlético Madrid
(Singapore)	(Spain)
0	2
- Date: 22 May 2013
- Venue: Jalan Besar Stadium, Singapore
- Referee: Yazeen Buhari
- Weather: Fine

The Singapore Olympic Foundation – Peter Lim Charity Cup, also known as the Peter Lim Charity Cup in short, was an exhibition fundraising match between the Singapore Selection and 2013 Copa del Rey winners, Atlético Madrid.

The match was held at the Jalan Besar Stadium on 22 May 2013 and Atlético Madrid prevailed with a 2-0 scoreline with goals coming from Raúl García and Diego Costa.

All ticket proceeds from the match went towards the Singapore Olympic Foundation, whose aim is to help promising young athletes from humble backgrounds realise their dreams of achieving sporting excellence.

A curtain raiser was also played prior to the match, with ex-Singapore internationals taking on a team of local celebrities.

== Singapore Selection ==
The Singapore Selection was named on 10 May 2013 and it was announced that current Singapore interim coach V Sundramoorthy would be taking charge of the team.

Apart from players from the LionsXII forming the bulk of the team, a total of 12 players from the S.League were also named, including former Singapore internationals Ahmad Latiff Khamaruddin, Indra Sahdan and Rosman Sulaiman. Foreign players Jozef Kapláň, Monsef Zerka and Sirina Camara were also selected for the game.

=== Squad ===
Name	Nationality	Position (s)	Date of Birth (Age)	Team
Goalkeepers
Izwan Mahbud	(Singapore)	GK	14 July 1990 (age 36)	(Singapore) LionsXII
Hassan Sunny	(Singapore)	GK	2 April 1984 (age 42)	(Singapore) Warriors F.C.
Defenders
Afiq Yunos	(Singapore)	DF	10 December 1990 (age 35)	(Singapore) Courts Young Lions
Noh Rahman	(Singapore)	DF	2 August 1980 (age 46)	(Singapore) Home United
Safuwan Baharudin	(Singapore)	DF	22 September 1991 (age 34)	(Singapore) LionsXII
Baihakki Khaizan	(Singapore)	DF	31 January 1984 (age 42)	(Singapore) LionsXII
Shakir Hamzah	(Singapore)	DF	20 October 1992 (age 33)	(Singapore) LionsXII
Hafiz Abu Sujad	(Singapore)	DF	1 November 1990 (age 35)	(Singapore) LionsXII
Daniel Bennett	(Singapore)	DF	7 January 1978 (age 48)	(Singapore) Warriors F.C.
Rosman Sulaiman	(Singapore)	DF	6 November 1982 (age 43)	(Singapore) Woodlands Wellington
Midfielders
Jozef Kapláň	(Slovakia)	MF	2 April 1986 (age 40)	(Singapore) Geylang International
Sirina Camara	(France)	MF	12 April 1991 (age 35)	(Singapore) Home United
Hariss Harun	(Singapore)	MF	19 November 1990 (age 35)	(Singapore) LionsXII
Faris Ramli	(Singapore)	MF	24 August 1992 (age 33)	(Singapore) LionsXII
Isa Halim	(Singapore)	MF	15 May 1986 (age 40)	(Singapore) LionsXII
Mustafić Fahrudin	(Singapore)	MF	17 April 1981 (age 45)	(Singapore) Tampines Rovers
Ahmad Latiff Khamaruddin	(Singapore)	MF	29 May 1979 (age 47)	(Singapore) Tanjong Pagar United
Forwards
Indra Sahdan Daud	(Singapore)	FW	5 March 1979 (age 47)	(Singapore) Home United
Fazrul Nawaz	(Singapore)	FW	17 April 1985 (age 41)	(Singapore) LionsXII
Shahril Ishak	(Singapore)	FW	23 January 1984 (age 42)	(Singapore) LionsXII
Aleksandar Đurić	(Singapore)	FW	12 August 1970 (age 56)	(Singapore) Tampines Rovers
Monsef Zerka	(Morocco)	FW	30 August 1981 (age 44)	(Singapore) Tanjong Pagar United
Coaches
V Sundramoorthy	(Singapore)	Head coach	(Singapore) LionsXII	
Kanan Vedhamuthu	(Singapore)	Assistant coach	(Singapore) Geylang International	

== Pre-match ==
=== Ticketing ===
Tickets for the Charity Cup were made available sale from 15 April 2013 through Ticketbooth with prices ranging between $15 and $50.

== Match ==
=== Details ===
22 May 2013
20:00 UTC+8

Singapore Selection	0 – 2	(Spain) Atlético Madrid
	Report	29' Raúl García; 87' Diego Costa

Jalan Besar Stadium, Singapore
Referee: Yazeen Buhari

Singapore Selection	Atlético Madrid
