= 2014 Singapore Charity Shield =

Tampines Rovers	Home United
1	0
- Date: 21 February 2014
- Venue: Jalan Besar Stadium, Singapore
- Man of the Match: Mustafić Fahrudin (Tampines Rovers)
- Referee: Muhd Taqi (SIN)
- Attendance: 3,328

The 2014 Singapore Charity Shield was the seventh Singapore Charity Shield, held on 21 February 2014 at Jalan Besar Stadium, between the winners of the previous season's 2013 S.League and 2013 Singapore Cup competitions. The match was contested by the champions of the 2013 S.League, Tampines Rovers, and the 2013 Singapore Cup winners, Home United.

Tampines Rovers won the Shield for a record 4th time in consecutive seasons after a 1–0 win over Home United, with Miljan Mrdaković scoring the only goal.

== Match ==
=== Details ===
21 February 2014
19:30 SST

Tampines Rovers	1–0	Home United
Mrdaković 47'	Report

Jalan Besar Stadium, Kallang
Attendance: 3,328
Referee: Muhd Taqi (SIN)

Tampines Rovers	Home United

GK	1	(Singapore) Hyrulnizam Juma'at
RB	6	(Japan) Kunihiro Yamashita
CB	7	(Singapore) Mustafić Fahrudin (c)
CB	16	(Japan) Norihiro Kawakami
LB	7	(Singapore) Shaiful Esah		(substituted off) 67'
RM	23	(Singapore) Imran Sahib	(yellow card) 90+1'
CM	8	(Singapore) Shahdan Sulaiman
CM	11	(Paraguay) Luis Closa	(yellow card) 50'
LM	9	(Singapore) Aleksandar Đurić		(substituted off) 81'
CF	19	(Paraguay) Roberto Martinez
CF	10	(Serbia) Miljan Mrdaković		(substituted off) 76'
Substitutes:
GK	13	(Singapore) Ridhuan Barudin
DF	6	(Singapore) Jufri Taha
DF	12	(Singapore) Anaz Hadee	(yellow card) 82'	(substituted on) 67'
DF	2	(Singapore) Ismadi Mukhtar
MF	17	(Singapore) Jamil Ali		(substituted on) 81'
MF	20	(Singapore) Ang Zhiwei
FW	18	(Singapore) Noh Alam Shah	(yellow card) 88'	(substituted on) 76'
Manager:
(Singapore) Salim Moin

GK	14	(Singapore) Shahril Jantan
CB	4	(Singapore) Juma'at Jantan (c)
CB	9	(South Korea) Kwon Da-kyung
CB	18	(France) Sirina Camara
DM	11	(Singapore) Izzdin Shafiq	(yellow card) 58'	(substituted off) 88'
RW	10	(Singapore) Yasir Hanapi
CM	13	(South Korea) Lee Kwan-woo
CM	12	(South Korea) Song In-young		(substituted off) 72'
LW	7	(Brazil) Bruno Castanheira		(substituted off) 69'
AM	16	(Singapore) Qiu Li	(yellow card) 82' (yellow-red card)
FW	8	(Singapore) Masrezwan Masturi
Substitutes:
GK	22	(Singapore) Farhan Amin
MF	6	(Singapore) Sevki Sha'ban
MF	15	(Singapore) Fazli Ayob		(substituted on) 88'
MF	27	(Singapore) Syahiran Miswan		(substituted on) 72'
FW	3	(Singapore) Zulkifli Suzliman
FW	20	(Singapore) Ahmad Fahmie		(substituted on) 69'
Manager:
(South Korea) Lee Lim-saeng

Man of the match

- Mustafić Fahrudin (Tampines Rovers)

Match officials

- Referee: Muhd Taqi (SIN)
- Assistant referees:
  - Jeffrey Goh (SIN)
  - Edwin Lee (SIN)
- Fourth official: W. Ravisanthiran (SIN)
- Match commissioner: Salikin Sarkawi (SIN)

Match rules

- 90 minutes.
- Penalty shoot-out if scores level after 90 minutes.
- Maximum of seven-named substitutes.
- Maximum of three substitutions.

== See also ==
- 2014 S.League
- 2014 Singapore Cup
- 2014 Singapore League Cup
