= Izwan Mahbud =

Singaporean footballer (born 1990)

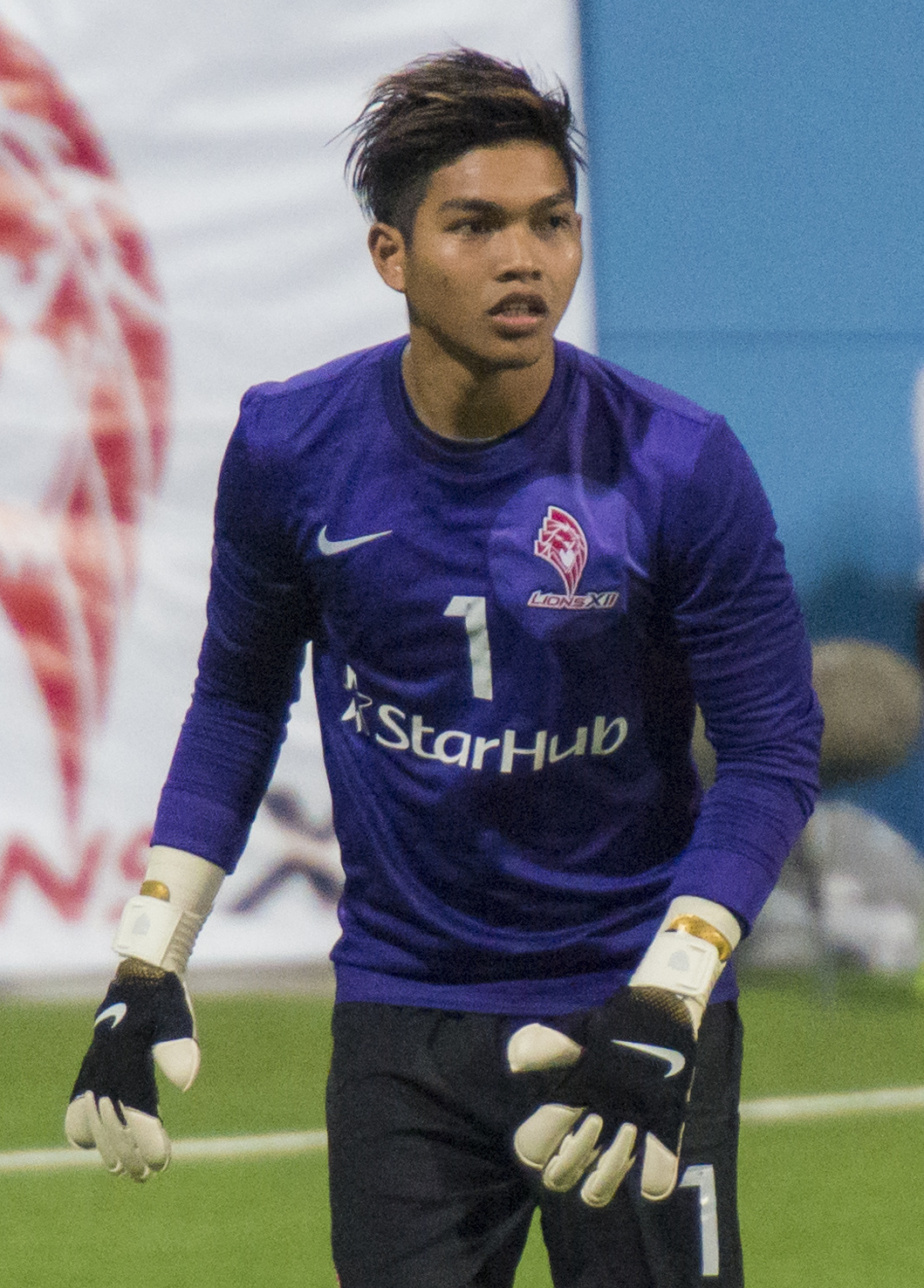
- Izwan Mahbud with LionsXII in 2014

Personal information
- Full name: Mohamad Izwan Bin Mahbud
- Date of birth: 14 July 1990 (age 36)
- Place of birth: Singapore
- Height: 1.77 m (5 ft 9 1/2 in)
- Position: Goalkeeper

Team information
- Current team: Young Lions
- Number: 1

Youth career
- 2006–2008: National Football Academy

Senior career*
Years	Team	Apps	(Gls)
2008–2011	Young Lions	63	(0)
2012–2015	LionsXII	54	(0)
2016–2017	Tampines Rovers	27	(0)
2018–2019	Nongbua Pitchaya	32	(0)
2020	Trat	3	(0)
2020–2021	Samut Prakan City	3	(0)
2021	Hougang United	10	(0)
2022–2026	Lion City Sailors	31	(0)
2026	→ Young Lions (loan)	29	(0)
2026–	Young Lions	29	(0)

International career^{‡}
2011–	Singapore	79	(0)
Medal record
Men's football
Representing Singapore
Sea Games
Bronze medal – third place	Naypyidaw 2013	Football
Asean Football Championship
Winner	AFF Suzuki Cup 2012	2012
- * Club domestic league appearances and goals ‡ National team caps and goals as of 19 August 2026

Mohamad Izwan bin Mahbud (born 14 July 1990) is a Singaporean professional footballer who plays as a goalkeeper for Singapore Premier League team Young Lions and the Singapore national team.

Izwan was also the captain of the Singapore Selection XI during the 2015 Premier League Asia Trophy against Arsenal and Stoke City.

== Club career ==
=== Young Lions ===
Izwan began his professional football career with S.League club Young Lions in 2008 after playing at the National Football Academy.

=== LionsXII ===
In January 2012, Izwan joined the newly created club, LionsXll which compete in the Malaysia Super League. During his time with the LionsXII, Izwan helped the team win the 2013 Malaysian Super League and 2015 Malaysian FA Cup titles. During his time at the club, he was seen being used as a free kick taker during some of the club matches.

==== Making headlines in Japan and stints with Matsumoto Yamaga ====
On 16 June 2015, Izwan pulled a magnificent performance at the Saitama Stadium which shocked a 0–0 draw between Singapore and Japan. Izwan's heroic displays have drawn praise from Japanese fans and club coaches and also drew interest from several clubs, including newly promoted J-League 1 side Matsumoto Yamaga. Yamaga's vice-president, Yoshiyuki Kato stated that he was very impressed by Izwan's concentration and ability and gave Izwan a one-week trial at Yamaga. It was later revealed that uncertainty over his ability and the language barrier prevented Izwan from becoming the first Singaporean to play in the J.League, with the club expressing concerns that Izwan was not any better than the local players Yamaga had.

==== Heavily linked to Real Sociedad ====
On 16 November 2015, Singapore goalkeeping coach, John Burridge said that David Moyes was thinking about signing Izwan to La Liga side, Real Sociedad as a back-up to first choice goalkeeper, Gerónimo Rulli but Moyes got sacked a week before so the deal didn't materialized.

=== Tampines Rovers ===
In late 2015, when the decision was made by the Football Association of Malaysia to kick the LionsXII out of the Malaysian Super League, Izwan, along with former teammates Christopher van Huizen, Izzdin Shafiq, Hafiz Sujad and Firdaus Kasman linked up with former coach V. Sundramoorthy at Tampines Rovers.

=== Nongbua Pitchaya ===
After spending two years with Tampines Rovers, Izwan signed for Nongbua Pitchaya on 14 December 2017, becoming the second Singaporean to play in the Thai League 2, alongside compatriot and fellow goalkeeper, Hassan Sunny, who joined Army United for a second stint. It was reported that Izwan took a pay cut to join the Thai side, underlining his fierce desire to try his talent overseas. His move to Thailand was a successful one as he was named in FourFourTwo's Thai League 2 Team of the Season at the end of the 2018 season.

=== Trat ===
After spending two seasons in the Thai League 2, on 16 December 2019, Izwan signed for top-flight Thailand side Trat for the 2020 Thai League 1 season.

=== Hougang United ===
On 27 June 2021, Izwan return to his home country after a long stint in Thailand by signing for the Singapore Premier League side Hougang United for the remainder of the 2021 season.

Izwan's Hougang debut didn't go as planned as the Cheetahs lost 4–1 to Tanjong Pagar United. Izwan couldn't preserve a point for his side against Albirex at home after conceding a lobbed goal by Takahiro Tezuka and ultimately lost to the title holders.

Izwan picked up his first clean sheet for the Cheetahs in a 1–0 win against Young Lions

=== Lion City Sailors ===
On 8 January 2022, Izwan joined the newly privatised Singaporean club, Lion City Sailors on a 2-year contract. He was used as a backed up goalkeeper behind national teammates, Hassan Sunny. In 2023, Izwan featured in all of the cup matches which he helped the club to win the 2023 Singapore Cup.

Midway during the 2024–25 season, Izwan was chosen as the main choice goalkeeper replacing Zharfan Rohaizad after a couple of blunders throughout the season. Izwan also kept a clean sheet during the 2024–25 AFC Champions League Two fixture against Chinese club Zhejiang Professional where he pulled a couples of saves in a 2–0 win. During the second leg of the AFC Champions League semi-final match at the Sydney Football Stadium on 16 April 2025, Izwan put up a couple of magnificent saves thus seeing Lion City Sailors qualified to a historical 2025 AFC Champions League Two final. Despite Maxime Lestienne's equaliser in the 91st minute of the 2025 AFC Champions League Two final against Sharjah, the Sailors finished as a runner-up after conceding in the 97th minute to finish the game in a 1–2 defeat.

==== Loan to Young Lions ====
On 7 January 2026, Izwan joined Young Lions on loan for the remainder of the 2025–26 season. On his first match for Young Lions on 16 January, he received a red card in the 22' minute against Tampines Rovers.

Izwan was released by Lion City Sailors FC on 30 May 2026 following the conclusion of his loan spell. He is currently without a club.

== International career ==
Izwan made his international debut for Singapore in a friendly match against Chinese Taipei on 18 July 2011. He rose to prominence in 2011 when he started in goal for Singapore as they defeated traditional rivals Malaysia over a two-leg 2014 FIFA World Cup qualifier in the same month.

On 16 June 2015, Izwan made 18 saves as Singapore managed keep a clean sheet against Asian giants, Japan to a 0–0 draw in Saitama during a 2018 FIFA World Cup qualifier match.

On 12 June 2021, Izwan played managed to hold 3-time AFC Asian Cup winners, Saudi Arabia from scoring until the 83rd minute where Salem Al-Dawsari broke the deadlock.

On 18 November 2024, Izwan returned to the starting line-up after a 3 years absence with the national team where he played in a 3–2 loss to Chinese Taipei.

On 1 October 2026, Izwan let in 6 goals without even trying to pretend to give his team a 6-0 defeat against Malaysia during a newly created FIFA ASEAN Cup. His performance brought so many controversies and accusations of him receiving money to get Malaysia leapfrog Indonesia in the standings.

== Career statistics ==
=== Club ===
As of match played 25 September 2024. Caps and goals may not be correct.

Club	Season	S.League		Singapore Cup		Singapore League Cup		Asia		Total	
Club	Season	Apps	Goals	Apps	Goals	Apps	Goals	Apps	Goals	Apps	Goals
Young Lions	2008	5	0	-	-	-	-	—		5	0
Young Lions	2009	9	0	-	-	-	-	—		9	0
Young Lions	2010	24	0	5	0	1	0	—		30	0
Young Lions	2011	25	0	—		—		—		25	0
Young Lions	Total	63	0	5	0	1	0	0	0	69	0
Club	Season	Malaysia Super League		Malaysia FA Cup		Malaysia Cup		Asia		Total	
LionsXII	2012	11	0	1	0	8	0	—		20	0
LionsXII	2013	21	0	1	0	8	0	—		30	0
LionsXII	2014	22	0	2	0	6	0	—		30	0
LionsXII	2015	0	0	0	0	0	0	—		0	0
LionsXII	Total	54	0	4	0	22	0	0	0	80	0
Club	Season	S.League		Singapore Cup		Singapore League Cup		Asia		Total	
Tampines Rovers	2016	18	0	4	0	0	0	9	0	21	0
Tampines Rovers	2017	17	0	2	0	0	0	7	0	26	0
Tampines Rovers	Total	35	0	6	0	0	0	16	0	47	0
Club	Season	Thai League T2		Thai FA Cup		Thai League Cup		Asia		Total	
Nongbua Pitchaya	2018	0	0	-	-	-	-	—		0	0
Nongbua Pitchaya	2019	32	0	0	0	1	0	—		33	0
Nongbua Pitchaya	Total	0	0	0	0	0	0	0	0	0	0
Trat	2020	3	0	-	-	-	-	—		3	0
Trat	Total	3	0	0	0	0	0	0	0	3	0
Samut Prakan City	2020	3	0	-	-	-	-	—		3	0
Samut Prakan City	Total	3	0	0	0	0	0	0	0	3	0
Club	Season	S.League		Singapore Cup		Others		Asia		Total	
Hougang United	2021	10	0	0	0	0	0	0	0	10	0
Hougang United	Total	10	0	0	0	0	0	0	0	10	0
Lion City Sailors	2022	8	0	3	0	0	0	0	0	11	0
Lion City Sailors	2023	0	0	6	0	0	0	0	0	6	0
Lion City Sailors	2024–25	7	0	0	0	1	0	1	0	9	0
Lion City Sailors	Total	15	0	9	0	1	0	1	0	26	0
Career total		160	0	23	0	24	0	10	0	206	0

- Young Lions and LionsXII are ineligible for qualification to AFC competitions in their respective leagues.
- Young Lions withdrew from the Singapore Cup and Singapore League Cup in 2011 due to scheduled participation in the 2011 AFF U-23 Youth Championship.

=== International ===
No	Date	Venue	Opponent	Result	Competition
1	18 July 2011	Jalan Besar Stadium, Kallang, Singapore	Chinese Taipei	3-2 (won)	Friendly
2	23 July 2011	Jalan Besar Stadium, Kallang, Singapore	Malaysia	5-3 (won)	2014 FIFA World Cup qualification – AFC second round
3	28 July 2011	Bukit Jalil National Stadium, Kuala Lumpur, Malaysia	Malaysia	1-1 (draw)	2014 FIFA World Cup qualification – AFC second round
4	2 September 2011	Tuodong Sports Center, Kunming, China	China	1-2 (lost)	2014 FIFA World Cup qualification – AFC third round
5	7 October 2011	Jalan Besar Stadium, Kallang, Singapore	Philippines	2-0 (won)	Friendly
6	2 September 2011	Jalan Besar Stadium, Kallang, Singapore	Jordan	0-3 (lost)	2014 FIFA World Cup qualification – AFC third round
7	1 June 2012	Hong Kong Stadium, So Kon Po, Singapore	Hong Kong	0-1 (lost)	Friendly
8	8 June 2012	Jalan Besar Stadium, Kallang, Singapore	Malaysia	2-2 (draw)	Friendly
9	15 August 2012	Jurong West Stadium, Jurong, Singapore	Hong Kong	2-0 (won)	Friendly
10	11 September 2012	Thuwunna YTC Stadium, Yangon, Myanmar	Myanmar	1-1 (draw)	Friendly
11	16 October 2012	Choa Chu Kang Stadium, Choa Chu Kang, Singapore	India	2-0 (won)	Friendly
12	25 November 2012	Bukit Jalil National Stadium, Kuala Lumpur, Malaysia	Malaysia	3-0 (won)	2012 AFF Championship
13	28 November 2012	Bukit Jalil National Stadium, Kuala Lumpur, Malaysia	Indonesia	0-1 (lost)	2012 AFF Championship
14	1 December 2012	Shah Alam Stadium, Shah Alam, Malaysia	Laos	4-3 (won)	2012 AFF Championship
15	8 December 2012	Rizal Memorial Stadium, Manila, Philippines	Philippines	0-0 (draw)	2012 AFF Championship
16	12 December 2012	Jalan Besar Stadium, Kallang, Singapore	Malaysia	1-0 (won)	2012 AFF Championship
17	19 December 2012	Jalan Besar Stadium, Kallang, Singapore	Thailand	3–1 (won)	2012 AFF Championship
18	22 December 2012	Supachalasai Stadium, Bangkok, Thailand	Thailand	0–1 (lost)	2012 AFF Championship

== Honours ==
=== Club ===
LionsXII

- Malaysia Super League: 2013
- FA Cup Malaysia: 2015

Lion City Sailors

- AFC Champions League Two runner-up: 2024–25
- Singapore Premier League: 2024–25
- Singapore Cup: 2023, 2024–25
- Singapore Community Shield: 2022, 2024; runner-up: 2025

=== International ===
- AFF Championship: 2012
- Southeast Asian Games: bronze medal – 2013
