= Miljan Mrdaković =

Serbian footballer (1982–2020)

Personal information
- Full name: Miljan Mrdaković
- Date of birth: 6 May 1982
- Place of birth: Niš, SFR Yugoslavia
- Date of death: 22 May 2020 (aged 38)
- Place of death: Belgrade, Serbia
- Height: 1.87 m (6 ft 2 in)
- Position: Striker

Youth career
- 1993–1995: Radnički Niš
- 1995–1998: Partizan
- 1998–2001: Anderlecht

Senior career*
Years	Team	Apps	(Gls)
2001–2002	Anderlecht	0	(0)
2002	→ Eendracht Aalst (loan)	3	(0)
2002–2003	OFK Beograd	32	(20)
2003–2004	Gent	22	(4)
2004	OFK Beograd	10	(1)
2005	Austria Salzburg	10	(3)
2005–2006	Metalist Kharkiv	27	(7)
2006–2007	Maccabi Tel Aviv	29	(7)
2007–2008	Vitória Guimarães	27	(6)
2008–2009	Shandong Luneng Taishan	18	(8)
2009–2011	Apollon Limassol	31	(21)
2010	→ Ethnikos Achna (loan)	14	(8)
2011–2012	AEK Larnaca	18	(7)
2012	Jiangsu Sainty	5	(1)
2013	Enosis Neon Paralimni	15	(7)
2013–2014	Veria	13	(5)
2014	Tampines Rovers	25	(11)
2015	Levadiakos	3	(0)
2015	Vojvodina	6	(0)
2016	Agrotikos Asteras	5	(1)
2016	Rad	0	(0)
2017	OFK Beograd	5	(2)
Total		318	(119)

International career
1999–2001	FR Yugoslavia U18	8	(0)
2002	FR Yugoslavia U21	1	(0)
2008	Serbia Olympic (O.P.)	3	(1)
- * Club domestic league appearances and goals

Miljan Mrdaković (Serbian Cyrillic: Миљан Мрдаковић, pronounced [mǐʎan mr̩dǎːkoʋitɕ]; 6 May 1982 – 22 May 2020) was a Serbian professional footballer who played as a striker.

A journeyman, he played for 20 clubs across ten countries and scored 150 goals in all competitions. He also represented Serbia at the 2008 Olympics.

== Club career ==
Mrdaković was born in Niš, Socialist Federal Republic of Yugoslavia. After starting out at Radnički Niš and Partizan he moved to Belgian club Anderlecht at the age of 16, playing for their youth and reserve teams before going on loan to fellow Belgian Pro League side Eendracht Aalst in early 2002.

Subsequently, Mrdaković returned to his homeland and signed for OFK Beograd on a free transfer. He was his team's top scorer in the 2002–03 season and third overall with 20 league goals, and in August 2003 transferred back to Belgium by joining Gent on a four-year contract. He left by mutual agreement in April 2004, then spent a further one and a half years with OFK.

In early 2005, Mrdaković signed with Austria Salzburg. Six months later, he left for Metalist Kharkiv of the Ukrainian Premier League and, in August 2006, was acquired by Israeli side Maccabi Tel Aviv. During his spell at the latter, he scored eight times in all competitions.

After spending the 2007–08 campaign in the Portuguese Primeira Liga with Vitória de Guimarães, Mrdaković plied his trade in the Chinese Super League with Shandong Luneng Taishan. In July 2009, he agreed to a two-year deal at Apollon Limassol. He failed to make an immediate impact, being loaned to fellow Cypriot First Division club Ethnikos Achna the following transfer window.

Mrdaković returned to the Tsirio Stadium for 2010–11, netting a career-best 21 goals to lead all players. In June 2011, he signed with AEK Larnaca on a three-year contract. He scored seven times in the league during his tenure, leaving in February 2012.

In early 2012, Mrdaković rejoined the Chinese top flight with Jiangsu Sainty. He returned to Cyprus shortly after, joining Enosis Neon Paralimni.

After a few months in the Super League Greece with Veria, Mrdaković moved to Tampines Rovers of Singapore in January 2014 as their marquee player. He scored 25 goals overall, helping his team to win two cup titles (Charity Shield in February and League Cup in July).

In February 2015, Mrdaković returned to Greece and signed with Levadiakos. He joined Vojvodina on a one-year deal in June, scoring twice in the qualifying rounds of the UEFA Europa League as the side progressed to the play-off round.

Mrdaković returned to OFK Beograd on 19 January 2017, stating his intention to retire at the club.

== International career ==
Mrdaković represented FR Yugoslavia at the 2001 UEFA European Under-18 Championship. He was also capped for the national under-21 team, but saw little action due to a conflict with Vladimir Petrović.

In July 2008, Mrdaković was called up by Miroslav Đukić to the Serbia squad for the 2008 Summer Olympics; he was one of the three overage players alongside Aleksandar Živković and Vladimir Stojković. He appeared in all three group stage matches, scoring in the 4–2 loss against Ivory Coast.

Mrdaković received his first call-up to a full Serbia squad in May 2011, when Petrović selected him for two friendlies in Asia and Oceania. However, he missed the mini tour due to an injury picked up in a training session.

== Death ==
Mrdaković died by suicide in the Zvezdara municipality of Belgrade on 22 May 2020, aged 38.

== Career statistics ==
Appearances and goals by club, season and competition
Club	Season	League			National cup		League cup		Continental		Total	
Club	Season	Division	Apps	Goals	Apps	Goals	Apps	Goals	Apps	Goals	Apps	Goals
Anderlecht	2001–02	Belgian First Division	0	0	0	0	—		0	0	0	0
Eendracht Aalst (loan)	2001–02	Belgian First Division	3	0	0	0	—		—		3	0
OFK Beograd	2002–03	First League of Serbia and Montenegro	32	20	0	0	—		—		32	20
OFK Beograd	2003–04	First League of Serbia and Montenegro	0	0	0	0	—		2 (Note: Appearances in UEFA Intertoto Cup)	0	2	0
OFK Beograd	Total		32	20	0	0	—		2	0	34	20
Gent	2003–04	Belgian First Division	22	4	2	1	—		—		24	5
OFK Beograd	2003–04	First League of Serbia and Montenegro	4	0	0	0	—		0	0	4	0
OFK Beograd	2004–05	First League of Serbia and Montenegro	6	1	0	0	—		3	1	9	2
OFK Beograd	Total		10	1	0	0	—		3	1	13	2
Austria Salzburg	2004–05	Austrian Bundesliga	10	3	0	0	—		—		10	3
Metalist Kharkiv	2005–06	Vyshcha Liha	25	7	1	0	—		—		26	7
Metalist Kharkiv	2006–07	Vyshcha Liha	2	0	0	0	—		—		2	0
Metalist Kharkiv	Total		27	7	1	0	—		—		28	7
Maccabi Tel Aviv	2006–07	Israeli Premier League	29	7	1	0	6	1	—		36	8
Vitória Guimarães	2007–08	Primeira Liga	27	6	3	0	2	1	—		32	7
Shandong Luneng Taishan	2008	Chinese Super League	17	8	—		—		—		17	8
Shandong Luneng Taishan	2009	Chinese Super League	1	0	—		—		2 (Note: Appearances in AFC Champions League)	2	3	2
Shandong Luneng Taishan	Total		18	8	—		—		2	2	20	10
Apollon Limassol	2009–10	Cypriot First Division	1	0	0	0	—		—		1	0
Ethnikos Achna (loan)	2009–10	Cypriot First Division	14	8	0	0	—		—		14	8
Apollon Limassol	2010–11	Cypriot First Division	30	21	5	3	—		1 (Note: Appearances in UEFA Europa League)	0	36	24
Apollon Limassol	Total		31	21	5	3	—		1	0	37	24
AEK Larnaca	2011–12	Cypriot First Division	18	7	2	1	—		10	3	30	11
Jiangsu Sainty	2012	Chinese Super League	5	1	0	0	—		—		5	1
Enosis Neon	2012–13	Cypriot First Division	15	7	3	1	—		—		18	8
Veria	2013–14	Super League Greece	13	5	1	1	—		—		14	6
Tampines Rovers	2014	S.League	25	11	5	4	4	6	5 (Note: One appearance and one goal in AFC Champions League, four appearances and three goals in AFC Cup)	4	39	25
Levadiakos	2014–15	Super League Greece	3	0	0	0	—		—		3	0
Vojvodina	2015–16	Serbian SuperLiga	6	0	0	0	—		3	2	9	2
Agrotikos Asteras	2015–16	Greece Football League	5	1	0	0	—		—		5	1
Rad	2016–17	Serbian SuperLiga	0	0	0	0	—		—		0	0
OFK Beograd	2016–17	Serbian First League	5	2	0	0	—		—		5	2
Career total			318	119	23	11	12	8	26	12	379	150

== Honours ==
Shandong Luneng Taishan

- Chinese Super League: 2008

Tampines Rovers

- Singapore League Cup: 2014
- Singapore Charity Shield: 2014

Individual

- Cypriot First Division top scorer: 2010–11
