= Singapore Selection XI =

Football team of selected players from S.League

- Nickname: Singa Select
- Association: Football Association of Singapore (FAS)
- Confederation: AFC (Asia)
- Home stadium: Jalan Besar Stadium

Singapore Selection XI, commonly referred to as SPL All Stars, is a football team made up of Singapore internationals and selected players from the Singapore Premier League. The team mainly plays in exhibition and non-international matches commonly during the footballing off-season.

== History ==
Singapore Selection XI was created to form the best players in Singapore until 1996 when the Football Association of Singapore (FAS) created Singapore first professional league known as the S.League. Since 2001, Singapore Selection XI has participated in the Sultan of Selangor's Cup. Matches between the two sides has even been dubbed as the Malayan El'Clasico back in 1920s until the late 1990s.

From 2012 until 2014, Singapore Selection XI was restricted using up to four LionsXII players which were at the time competing in the Malaysia Super League. In 2013, the Singapore Selection XI coached by V. Sundramoorthy played against Atlético Madrid in the Peter Lim Charity Cup, losing by 0–2. In 2014, the team played against Juventus at the new National Stadium, Singapore and lost 0–5. The team also participated in the Barclays Asia Trophy in July 2015.

In 2024, after a seven year hiatus, Singapore Selection XI was reformed to take on Selangor at the iconic Merdeka Stadium on 17 August. Balestier Khalsa coach Peter de Roo was appointed for the team. De Roo took on 7 of his club players and reunited with 3 former players, Ho Wai Loon, Kyoga Nakamura and Daniel Goh, while Lion City Sailors refused to release their players due to tight fixtures. Faris Ramli appeared four times in the Sultan of Selangor's Cup, becoming the first player to achieved this. In the 2025 edition, Geylang International head coach, Mohd Noor Ali, who was originally selected to guide the team as head coach, will be replaced by Albirex Niigata (S) head coach, Keiji Shigetomi due to medical leave after sustaining an injury.

== Results and fixtures ==
List doesn't include matches in the Sultan of Selangor's Cup.

Date	Location	Head coach	Opponent	Result	Tournament
13 July 1977	Old National Stadium		(Scotland) Celtic	0–5	
12 June 1983	Old National Stadium		(Germany) Bayern Munich	2–0	
18 March 1993	Old National Stadium		(Japan) Nagoya Grampus	4–3	
20 May 1995	Old National Stadium		(England) Nottingham Forest	1–3	
26 May 1995	Old National Stadium		(England) Tottenham Hotspur	1–1 (Pen: 4–2)	
1 August 1996	Old National Stadium		(England) Newcastle United	0–5	Singapore first professional league all-star team
16 July 2001	Old National Stadium		(England) Liverpool	0–2	
24 July 2001	Old National Stadium		(England) Manchester United	1–8	
26 July 2009	Old National Stadium		(England) Liverpool	0–5	
24 July 2010	Jalan Besar Stadium		(England) Burnley	0–1	
22 May 2013	Jalan Besar Stadium	(Singapore) V. Sundramoorthy	(Spain) Atletico Madrid	0–2	Peter Lim Charity Cup
16 August 2014	National Stadium, Singapore	(Germany) Bernd Stange	(Italy) Juventus	0–5	1st official match at the New National Stadium
15 July 2015	National Stadium, Singapore	(Singapore) V. Sundramoorthy	(England) Arsenal	0–4	2015 Barclays Asia Trophy
18 July 2015	National Stadium, Singapore	(Singapore) V. Sundramoorthy	(England) Stoke City	0–2	2015 Barclays Asia Trophy

== Players ==
=== Current squad ===
As of 27 September 2025

The following 20 players were called up for the 2025 Sultan of Selangor's Cup. Geylang International head coach, Mohd Noor Ali, who was originally selected to guide the team as head coach, will be replaced by Albirex Niigata (S) head coach, Keiji Shigetomi due to medical leave after sustaining an injury.

Player	Age	Team
Goalkeepers
(Singapore) Hassan Sunny	2 April 1984 (age 41)	(Japan) Albirex Niigata (S)
(Singapore) Zharfan Rohaizad	21 February 1997 (age 28)	(Singapore) Hougang United
Defenders
(Singapore) Zulqarnaen Suzliman	29 March 1998 (age 27)	(Singapore) Lion City Sailors
(Singapore) Safuwan Baharudin	22 September 1991 (age 34)	(Singapore) Lion City Sailors
(Singapore) Ryaan Sanizal	31 May 2002 (age 23)	(Singapore) Hougang United
(Singapore) Jordan Vestering	25 September 2000 (age 25)	(Singapore) Hougang United
(Singapore) Joshua Pereira	10 October 1997 (age 28)	(Singapore) Geylang International
(Singapore) Shakir Hamzah	20 October 1992 (age 33)	(Singapore) Geylang International
(Singapore) Darren Teh	19 August 1996 (age 29)	(Singapore) Balestier Khalsa
(South Korea) Kim Tae-uk	20 June 1998 (age 27)	(Japan) Albirex Niigata (S)
(South Korea) Cho Eun-su	12 March 2004 (age 21)	(Japan) Albirex Niigata (S)
Midfielders
(Singapore) Huzaifah Aziz	27 June 1994 (age 31)	(Singapore) Hougang United
(Singapore) Haziq Kamarudin	6 March 2001 (age 24)	(Japan) Albirex Niigata (S)
(Singapore) Jared Gallagher	18 January 2002 (age 23)	(Japan) Albirex Niigata (S)
(Japan) Naoki Yoshioka	6 April 2002 (age 23)	(Japan) Albirex Niigata (S)
(Japan) Takumi Yokohata	15 August 2002 (age 23)	(Japan) Albirex Niigata (S)
(Japan) Katsuyuki Ishibashi	10 January 2002 (age 23)	(Japan) Albirex Niigata (S)
Forwards
(Singapore) Farhan Zulkifli	10 November 2002 (age 23)	(Singapore) Hougang United
(Japan) Ryoya Taniguchi	31 August 1999 (age 26)	(Singapore) Geylang International
(Japan) Shingo Nakano	26 December 2004 (age 20)	(Japan) Albirex Niigata (S)

== Veteran team ==
Players age are according to match date on 17 August 2024.

No.	Player
Goalkeepers
(Singapore) Rezal Hassan	14 February 1975 (age 49)
Defenders
(Singapore) Idham Ridhuan	
(Singapore) Razali Saad	14 August 1964
(Singapore) Nazri Nasir	17 January 1971
(Singapore) Syed Farouk	11 February 1967
(Singapore) Zulkarnaen Zainal	1 October 1973
(Singapore) Tan Sio Beng	27 June 1976
Midfielders
(Singapore) Leong Kok Fann	
(Singapore) Malek Awab	11 January 1961
(Singapore) Ellamulai Manimohan	
(Singapore) Steven Tan	28 December 1970
(Singapore) Dalis Supait	
(Singapore) Rafi Ali	11 December 1972
(Singapore) Fahmie Abdullah	
(Singapore) Mohd Noor Ali	16 May 1975
(Singapore) Aliimran Lomri	
(Singapore) Azhar Baskin	26 November 1976
Forwards
(Singapore) Tay Peng Kee	19 October 1961
(Singapore) Fandi Ahmad (captain)	29 May 1962
(Singapore) Nahar Daud	

== Coaching history ==
Sultan of Selangor Cup
Manager	Year	Achievements
(France) Patrick Vallée	2013	
(Singapore) Amin Nasir	2014	
(Singapore) Varadaraju Sundramoorthy	2015	
(Singapore) Philippe Aw	2016	2016 edition
(Singapore) Fandi Ahmad	2017	2017 edition
(Croatia) Marko Kraljević	2018	
(Singapore) Nazri Nasir	2019	
(Netherlands) Peter de Roo	2024	
(Japan) Keiji Shigetomi	2025	

Others tournament
Manager	Competition	Year	Achievements
(Singapore) Varadaraju Sundramoorthy	Peter Lim Charity Cup	2013	Runners-up
(Germany) Bernd Stange	Friendly vs Juventus	2014	
(Singapore) Varadaraju Sundramoorthy	Premier League Asia Trophy	2015	Fourth place

== Captain history ==
Sultan of Selangor Cup
Captain	Year	Achievements
(Singapore) Aleksandar Đurić	2013	
(Singapore) Fadhil Salim	2014	
(Singapore) Juma'at Jantan	2016	2016 edition
(Singapore) Shahril Ishak	2017	2017 edition
(Singapore) Yasir Hanapi	2018	
(Singapore) Shahdan Sulaiman	2019	
(Singapore) Madhu Mohana	2024	

Other tournaments
Captain	Competition	Year
(Singapore) Shahril Ishak	Peter Lim Charity Cup	2013
(Singapore) Shahril Ishak	Friendly vs Juventus	2014
(Singapore) Izwan Mahbud	Premier League Asia Trophy	2015

== Foreigners used in the team ==
Sultan of Selangor Cup
Player	Year	Achievements
(Japan) Atsushi Shimono; (Morocco) Monsef Zerka; (France) Kamel Ramdani	2013	
(Japan) Shunsuke Nakatake; (Japan) Kazuya Okazaki; (Brazil) Geison Moura; (Argentina) Leonel Felice; (Croatia) Igor Čerina	2014	
(Croatia) Stipe Plazibat; (France) Sirina Camara; (South Korea) Song Ui-young; (Denmark) Ken Ilsø	2016	2016 edition
(Japan) Yasutaka Yanagi; (Japan) Kento Nagasaki; (Canada) Jordan Webb	2017	2017 edition
(Japan) Shuhei Hoshino; (Japan) Kento Fukuda; (Japan) Wataru Murofushi; (Japan) Ryutaro Megumi	2018	
(Japan) Kyoga Nakamura; (Japan) Kaishu Yamazaki; (France) Jonathan Béhé	2019	
(Japan) Kodai Tanaka; (Japan) Riku Fukashiro; (Japan) Ryoya Taniguchi; (Slovenia) Alen Kozar	2024	
(Japan) Ryoya Taniguchi (Japan) Shingo Nakano (Japan) Naoki Yoshioka (Japan) Takumi Yokohata (Japan) Katsuyuki Ishibashi (South Korea) Cho Eun-su (South Korea) Kim Tae-uk	2025	

Other tournaments
Player	Competition	Year
(Morocco) Monsef Zerka; (France) Sirina Camara; (Slovakia) Jozef Kapláň	Peter Lim Charity Cup	2013
(Argentina) Nicolás Vélez; (France) Sirina Camara; (Croatia) Miroslav Pejić	Friendly vs Juventus	2014
(Argentina) Nicolás Vélez; (France) Sirina Camara; (Brazil) Rodrigo Pacheco	Premier League Asia Trophy	2015

== See also ==
- ASEAN All-Stars
- Malaysia League XI
- Indonesia XI
