= Brasil Global Tour =

National football team tour

- Current owner: Pitch International LLP.
- Introduced: 16 October 2012; 14 years ago
- Markets: Worldwide
- Tagline: "The five-time World Cup winners are bringing their unique brand of football to iconic stadiums across the world"
- Website: brasilglobaltour.com

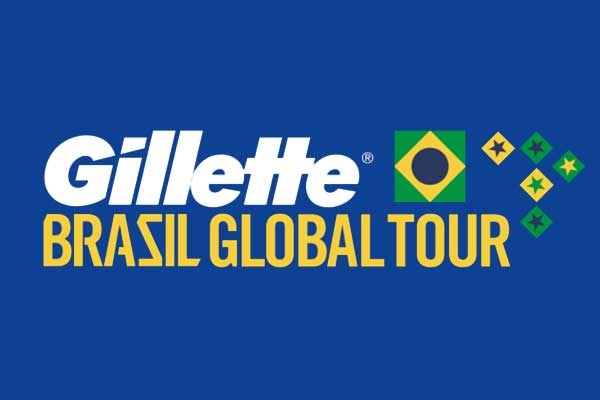
The former logo of the Brasil Global Tour which was sponsored by Gillette, and was in use from 2012 to 2015.

Brasil Global Tour, officially with sponsorship the Chevrolet Brasil Global Tour, is a package of all the friendlies of the Brazil national football team from October 2012 until the 2022 World Cup in Qatar. The CBF has used the fact that Brazil is one of the most sought after teams in the world to market itself and Brazil's friendly games on the international stage. The contract between CBF and Pitch International, the company that operates the tour, started in October 2012, and runs through the 2022 FIFA World Cup. Because Brazil was the host of the 2014 FIFA World Cup, they had no qualification games for the tournament as they automatically qualified as the hosts. This led to them only playing friendly games for the first few years of the contract, making the proposition more valuable to Pitch International.

== History ==
The CBF has leveraged Brazil's global popularity to market the team and its friendly games internationally. The contract between the CBF and Pitch International, the company that operates the tour, started in October 2012, and runs through the 2022 FIFA World Cup. Brazil, being the host of the 2014 FIFA World Cup, had no qualification games for the tournament as they automatically qualified as the hosts. This led to Brazil only playing friendly games for the first few years of the contract.

Pitch International was appointed in August 2012 with the first game to begin in October of the same year. The deal saw Pitch International replace Kentaro, an agency which had previously organized a package of Brazil friendlies around the world before 2012.

The CBF stated that before working with Pitch International, it struggled to profit from home friendly games, despite Brazil's high status in world football. The deal with Pitch International sees the CBF paid a fee of approximately $1 million a game and Pitch International typical receives a match fee of in between $2–3 million per game.

To date there have been 54 games against various opponents on all 6 inhabited continents. Brazil has played once in Africa, 7 times in Asia, 2 times in Oceania, 19 times in Europe, 13 times in North America, and 12 times in South America.

== Games ==
Date	Home	Result	Guest	Stadium	Location	Attendance
16 October 2012	Brazil	4–0	Japan	Stadion Miejski	Wrocław, Poland	36,000
14 November 2012	Brazil	1–1	Colombia	MetLife Stadium	East Rutherford, NJ, United States	38,624
6 February 2013	England	2–1	Brazil	Wembley Stadium	London, England	87,453
22 March 2013	Italy	2–2	Brazil	Stade de Genève	Geneva, Switzerland	28,000
25 March 2013	Brazil	1–1	Russia	Stamford Bridge	London, England	35,206
6 April 2013	Bolivia	0–4	Brazil	Estadio Ramón Tahuichi Aguilera	Santa Cruz de la Sierra, Bolivia	35,000
24 April 2013	Brazil	2–2	Chile	Mineirão	Belo Horizonte, Brazil	53,331
2 June 2013	Brazil	2–2	England	Maracanã Stadium	Rio de Janeiro, Brazil	66,015
9 June 2013	Brazil	3–0	France	Arena do Grêmio	Porto Alegre, Brazil	51,919
14 August 2013	Switzerland	1–0	Brazil	St. Jakob-Park	Basel, Switzerland	31,100
7 September 2013	Brazil	6–0	Australia	Estádio Nacional de Brasília	Brasília, Brazil	40,996
10 September 2013	Brazil	3–1	Portugal	Gillette Stadium	Foxboro, MA, United States	62,310
12 October 2013	South Korea	0–2	Brazil	Seoul World Cup Stadium	Seoul, South Korea	65,038
15 October 2013	Brazil	2–0	Zambia	Beijing National Stadium	Beijing, China	48,000
17 November 2013	Honduras	0–5	Brazil	Hard Rock Stadium	Miami Gardens, FL, United States	71,124
20 November 2013	Brazil	3–1	Chile	Rogers Centre	Toronto, Canada	53,331
5 March 2014	South Africa	0–5	Brazil	FNB Stadium	Johannesburg, South Africa	67,616
3 June 2014	Brazil	4–0	Panama	Estádio Serra Dourada	Goiânia, Brazil	20,000
6 June 2014	Brazil	1–0	Serbia	Estádio do Morumbi	São Paulo, Brazil	67,042
6 September 2014	Brazil	1–0	Colombia	Hard Rock Stadium	Miami Gardens, FL, United States	73,479
9 September 2014	Brazil	1–0	Ecuador	MetLife Stadium	East Rutherford, NJ, United States	35,975
11 October 2014	Brazil	2–0	Argentina	Beijing National Stadium	Beijing, China	52,313
14 October 2014	Japan	0–4	Brazil	National Stadium	Singapore	51,557
12 November 2014	Turkey	0–4	Brazil	Atatürk Olympic Stadium	Istanbul, Turkey	50,509
18 November 2014	Austria	1–2	Brazil	Ernst-Happel-Stadion	Vienna, Austria	48,500
26 March 2015	France	1–3	Brazil	Stade de France	Saint-Denis, France	81,338
29 March 2015	Brazil	1–0	Chile	Emirates Stadium	London, England	60,007
7 June 2015	Brazil	2–0	Mexico	Allianz Parque	São Paulo, Brazil	34,659
10 June 2015	Brazil	1–0	Honduras	Estádio Beira-Rio	Porto Alegre, Brazil	22,305
5 September 2015	Brazil	1–0	Costa Rica	Red Bull Arena	Harrison, NJ, United States	19,600
8 September 2015	United States	1–4	Brazil	Gillette Stadium	Foxboro, MA, United States	29,308
30 May 2016	Brazil	2–0	Panama	Dick's Sporting Goods Park	Commerce City, CO, United States	11,000
25 January 2017	Brazil	1–0	Colombia	Estádio Nilton Santos	Rio de Janeiro, Brazil	18,695
9 June 2017	Brazil	0–1	Argentina	Melbourne Cricket Ground	Melbourne, Australia	95,969
13 June 2017	Australia	0–4	Brazil	Melbourne Cricket Ground	Melbourne, Australia	49,847
10 November 2017	Japan	1–3	Brazil	Stade Pierre-Mauroy	Villeneuve-d'Ascq, France	16,992
14 November 2017	England	0–0	Brazil	Wembley Stadium	London, England	84,595
23 March 2018	Russia	0–3	Brazil	Luzhniki Stadium	Moscow, Russia	59,263
27 March 2018	Germany	0–1	Brazil	Olympiastadion	Berlin, Germany	72,717
3 June 2018	Brazil	2–0	Croatia	Anfield Stadium	Liverpool, England	48,500
10 June 2018	Austria	0–3	Brazil	Ernst-Happel-Stadion	Vienna, Austria	54,000
7 September 2018	United States	0–2	Brazil	MetLife Stadium	East Rutherford, NJ, United States	32,489
11 September 2018	Brazil	5–0	El Salvador	FedEx Field	Landover, MD, United States	28,511
12 October 2018	Saudi Arabia	0–2	Brazil	King Fahd International Stadium	Riyadh, Saudi Arabia	23,401
16 October 2018	Argentina	0–1	Brazil	King Abdullah Sports City	Jeddah, Saudi Arabia	62,345
16 November 2018	Brazil	1–0	Uruguay	Emirates Stadium	London, England	35,000
20 November 2018	Brazil	1–0	Cameroon	Stadium MK	Milton Keynes, England	29,699
23 March 2019	Brazil	1–1	Panama	Estádio do Dragão	Porto, Portugal	33,600
26 March 2019	Czech Republic	1–3	Brazil	Eden Arena	Prague, Czech Republic	19,116
5 June 2019	Brazil	2–0	Qatar	Estádio Nacional Mané Garrincha	Brasília, Brazil	34,204
9 June 2019	Brazil	7–0	Honduras	Estádio Beira-Rio	Porto Alegre, Brazil	16,521
6 September 2019	Brazil	2–2	Colombia	Hard Rock Stadium	Miami Gardens, FL, United States	65,232
10 September 2019	Brazil	0–1	Peru	Los Angeles Coliseum	Los Angeles, CA, United States	32,287
10 October 2019	Brazil	1–1	Senegal	National Stadium	Singapore	20,621
13 October 2019	Brazil	1–1	Nigeria	National Stadium	Singapore	20,385
15 November 2019	Brazil	0–1	Argentina	King Saud University Stadium	Riyadh, Saudi Arabia	22,451
19 November 2019	Brazil	3–0	South Korea	Mohammed bin Zayed Stadium	Abu Dhabi, United Arab Emirates	9,001
2 June 2022	South Korea	1–5	Brazil	Seoul World Cup Stadium	Seoul, South Korea	64,872
6 June 2022	Japan	0–1	Brazil	Japan National Stadium	Tokyo, Japan	63,638
23 September 2022	Brazil	3–0	Ghana	Stade Océane	Le Havre, France	25,178
27 September 2022	Brazil	5–1	Tunisia	Parc des Princes	Paris, France	47,000
