= 2015 Premier League Asia Trophy =

Tournament details
- Host country: Singapore
- Dates: 15 July – 18 July
- Teams: 4 (from 2 confederations)
- Venue: 1 (in 1 host city)

Final positions
- Champions: (England) Arsenal (1st title)
- Runners-up: (England) Everton
- Third place: (England) Stoke City
- Fourth place: Singapore Selection XI

Tournament statistics
- Matches played: 4
- Goals scored: 10 (2.5 per match)
- Attendance: 124,817 (31,204 per match)
- Top scorer: (England) Chuba Akpom (3 goals)
- Best player: (Spain) Santi Cazorla

The 2015 Premier League Asia Trophy was the seventh edition of the Premier League Asia Trophy. Arsenal, Everton, Stoke City and Singapore Selection XI competed for the Premier League Asia Trophy. It was held in Singapore at the National Stadium from 15–18 July 2015. The 3rd/4th placing and finals were played on 18 July 2015.

== Results ==
Semi-finals
15 July – Singapore
(England) Everton (pen.)	0 (5)
(England) Stoke City	0 (4)
15 July – Singapore
Singapore Select XI	0
(England) Arsenal	4

Final
18 July – Singapore
(England) Everton	1
(England) Arsenal	3
Third place
18 July – Singapore
(England) Stoke City	2
Singapore Select XI	0

=== Semi-finals ===
All kick-off times are local (UTC+08:00).

15 July 2015
18:00

Everton (England)	0–0	(England) Stoke City
	Report
Penalties
Lukaku (penalty scored); Cleverley (penalty scored); Stones (penalty scored); Deulofeu (penalty scored); Jagielka (penalty scored)	5–4	(penalty scored) Adam; (penalty missed) Van Ginkel; (penalty scored) Walters; (penalty scored) Bardsley; (penalty scored) Crouch

National Stadium, Singapore
Attendance: 17,843
Referee: Craig Pawson (England)

15 July 2015
20:30

Singapore Select XI	0–4	(England) Arsenal
	Report	Akpom 30', 76' (pen.), 79'; Wilshere 60' (pen.)

National Stadium, Singapore
Attendance: 29,867
Referee: Jon Moss (England)

=== Third place play-off ===
18 July 2015
18:00

Stoke City (England)	2–0	Singapore Select XI
Sidwell 7'; Arnautović 73'	Report

National Stadium, Singapore
Attendance: 25,000
Referee: Muhammad Taqi (Singapore)

=== Final ===
18 July 2015
20:30

Everton (England)	1–3	(England) Arsenal
Barkley 75'	Report	Walcott 22'; Cazorla 58'; Özil 62'

National Stadium, Singapore
Attendance: 52,107
Referee: Craig Pawson (England)

Everton	Arsenal

== Goalscorers ==
3 goals

- (England) Chuba Akpom

1 goal

- (Austria) Marko Arnautović
- (England) Ross Barkley
- (England) Steve Sidwell
- (England) Theo Walcott
- (England) Jack Wilshere
- (Germany) Mesut Özil
- (Spain) Santi Cazorla
