= Sirina Camara =

Footballer (born 1991)

Personal information
- Full name: Sirina Camara
- Date of birth: 12 April 1991 (age 35)
- Place of birth: Pierrefitte, Paris, France
- Height: 1.78 m (5 ft 10 in)
- Positions: Left-back; centre-back

Team information
- Current team: Home United
- Number: 11

Senior career*
Years	Team	Apps	(Gls)
2010	Pierrefitte FC	3	(0)
2011	Étoile	25	(2)
2012	Young Lions	27	(1)
2013–2018	Home United	119	(9)
- * Club domestic league appearances and goals as of 12:51, 29 May 2016 (UTC)

Sirina Camara (born 12 April 1991) is a French football who plays for S.League club Home United as a defender. Camara can play either as a left-back or centre-back. Prior to playing for Home United, Camara has also played for Étoile and Young Lions in the S.League.

== Early life ==
Camara was born in an area north of Paris, known as Pierrefitte. His mother was born in Mali and emigrated to France when she was just 18. Camara is born of Malian descent, and is a Muslim. He started playing football in his teenage years, and went on to join the local amateur club, Pierrefitte FC when he was 14. Four years later, he moved to Singapore in order to improve his chances of building a sustainable footballing career, at the advice of his mother. Camara's mother had advised that it would be very tough for him to be a successful player back in France as he was young, but he might get a better opportunity overseas. Camara subsequently made the move after a coach he knew probed if he was interested to play in Singapore.

== Club career ==
After moving to Singapore, Camara signed professional terms with S.League defending champions Étoile, joining the team to play in the 2011 S.League season. He made his debut in a 0-0 draw against Balestier Khalsa. His first goal for the club would come in the 1-1 draw against Home United in the 2011 Singapore Cup. His first league goal came on 27 September 2011, in the 2-1 victory over Hougang United.

Following the withdrawal of Étoile from the 2012 S.League season, Camara moved to Young Lions before signing for Home United in 2013. He won the Singapore Cup in his maiden season with Home United and earned recognition by being awarded the S.League Young Player of the Year award. With Home United, he was also part of the league's strongest defence that season as they finished eventually as the runner-up.

In 2014, Camara was first called up by the Football Association of Singapore to play for the Singapore Selection XI, a squad of players comprising Singapore international footballers and selected players that were playing in the S.League. Camara played subsequently for the Singapore Selection XI in a friendly against Serie A giants Juventus, losing 5-0. In 2015, Camara was selected to join the squad once again to participate in the 2015 Barclays Asia Trophy which was hosted in Singapore. On 15 July 2015 and 18 July 2015 respectively, he played for the squad against Premier League clubs Stoke City and Arsenal, eventually losing 2-0 and 4-0.

Camara scored his first goal of the 2015 S.League season in the 3rd match of the season, scoring the 2nd goal in a 2-0 win over Tampines Rovers to hand Home United their first win of the season. On 12 August 2015, in a rare display of indiscipline, Camara was sent off in the 15th minute of the RHB Singapore Cup quarter-final, first-leg match against Warriors FC, after seen by the referee uttering something to the linesman. Home United played on with ten men for the remainder of the match, even dropping to nine subsequently after teammate Yasir Hanapi received a second yellow card late into the match. Despite the two dismissals, Home United eventually went on to win 2-1.

== International career ==
In July 2013, Camara had indicated he was receptive to the idea of obtaining Singaporean citizenship and playing for the Singapore national football team. National team coach Bernd Stange had been impressed with Camara's ability to play in several positions, adding that he was capable of playing for a top European club. Stange also mentioned that he would call up Camara if he had a Singapore passport.

== Career statistics ==
=== Club ===
As of 12:51, 29 May 2016 (UTC)

Club	Season	S.League		Singapore Cup		Singapore League Cup		Asia		Total	
Club	Season	Apps	Goals	Apps	Goals	Apps	Goals	Apps	Goals	Apps	Goals
Étoile	2011	29	2	6	1	0	0	—		35	3
Étoile	Total	29	2	6	1	0	0	0	0	35	3
Young Lions	2012	22	0	0	0	4	0	—		26	0
Young Lions	Total	22	0	0	0	4	0	0	0	26	0
Home United	2013	26	4	6	1	4	1	—		36	6
Home United	2014	24	1	6	2	3	1	6	0	39	4
Home United	2015	22	1	3	0	2	0	0	0	27	1
Home United	2016	12	1	1	0	0	0	0	0	13	1
Home United	2017	12	0	2	0	2	0	8	0	24	0
Home United	2018	7	2	0	0	0	0	5	0	12	2
Home United	Total	103	9	18	3	11	2	19	0	151	14
Career Total		154	11	24	4	15	2	19	0	212	17

- Etoile and Young Lions are ineligible for qualification to AFC competitions.
- Young Lions withdrew from the 2012 Singapore Cup due to participation in the 2013 AFC U-22 Championship qualifiers.

== Honours ==
=== Club ===
Home United

- S.League
  - Runner-up: 2013
- Singapore Cup
  - Winner: 2013
  - Runner-up: 2014, 2015

=== Individual ===
- S.League Young Player of the Year: 2013
