= Hassan Sunny =

Singaporean footballer

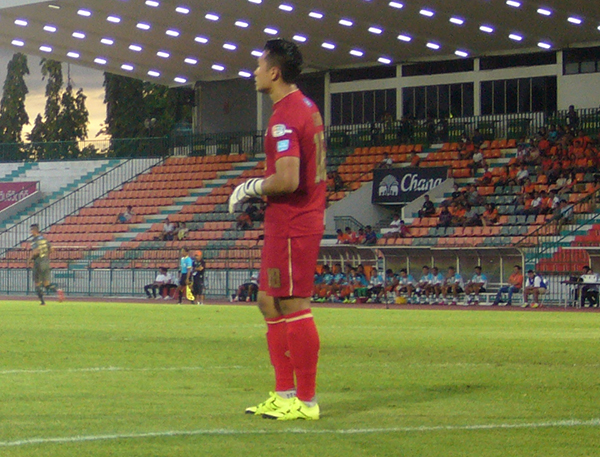
- Hassan Sunny playing for Army United in 2015

Personal information
- Full name: Hassan bin Abdullah Sunny
- Date of birth: 2 April 1984 (age 42)
- Place of birth: Singapore
- Height: 1.85 m (6 ft 1 in)
- Position: Goalkeeper

Team information
- Current team: FC Jurong
- Number: 18

Youth career
- 2000–2002: National Football Academy

Senior career*
Years	Team	Apps	(Gls)
2003	Geylang United	31	(0)
2004–2005	Young Lions	43	(0)
2006–2007	Geylang United	52	(0)
2008–2011	Tampines Rovers	104	(0)
2012–2014	Warriors	62	(0)
2015–2016	Army United	54	(0)
2017	Home United	34	(0)
2018–2019	Army United	50	(0)
2020–2022	Lion City Sailors	58	(0)
2023–	FC Jurong	88	(0)

International career
2004–2024	Singapore	115	(0)
Medal record
Men's football
Representing Singapore
Sea Games
Bronze medal – third place	Nakhon Ratchasima 2007	Football
Asean Football Championship
Winner	Tiger Cup 2004	2004
Winner	AFF Championship 2007	2007
- * Club domestic league appearances and goals

Hassan bin Abdullah Sunny (born on 2 April 1984) is a Singaporean professional footballer who plays as a goalkeeper for Singapore Premier League club FC Jurong.

In 2016, The Daily Telegraph ranked him 18th on its list of the world's top 20 goalkeepers, which Sunny first thought was an April Fools' joke.

Hassan also made numerous headlines while playing for Singapore where during a match against Indonesia in the 2020 AFF Championship, where he was praised by both Singaporean and Indonesian fans for putting an end to the Singapore–Indonesia rivalry. Hassan was later voted into the "Team of the Tournament". Another of his notable performances came during a 2026 FIFA World Cup qualification match, making 11 crucial saves against Thailand. Hassan is also the first and only player in the history of the Singapore Premier League to win four league titles with four different clubs.

== Club career ==
=== Geylang United ===
In 2003, Sunny joined Geylang United from the National Football Academy. He was nominated for S-League Young Player of the Year.

=== Young Lions ===
In 2004, Sunny joined the newly-formed Young Lions Football Club. Sunny joined alongside Baihakki Khaizan, Shahril Ishak and Khairul Amri, a group known as the "NFA Gang of Four" for playing together since their early teens.

=== Geylang United ===
After completing the National Service in Singapore, Sunny returned to Geylang United in 2006.

=== Tampines Rovers ===
In January 2008, Sunny joined Tampines Rovers, rivals of Geylang United. He made his debut on 1 March in a 1–1 draw against Balestier Khalsa. In March 2011, he marked his 100th appearance for the club, the same year in which Tampines Rovers secured both the S.League and the Singapore Community Shield titles.

=== Singapore Armed Forces (Warriors) ===
In December 2011, Sunny joined the Singapore Armed Forces. Sunny later played in the AFC Cup against Indonesian the club Semen Padang in a 3–1 defeat on 5 March 2013. He registered his first clean sheet in the competition in a 1–0 victory over Indian club Churchill Brothers on 10 April 2013. He participated in the 2014 S.League season when the Warriors FC won the league title. He went on to became the first goalkeeper to win the S.League 'Player of the Year' award in 2014.

=== Army United ===
Sunny joined Army United for the 2015 Thai Premier League season, making his debut in a 1–0 win over Royal Thai Navy. In November 2015, he signed a new two-year contract with the club Army United The Daily Telegraph ranked him 18th in its list of the top 20 goalkeepers worldwide in 2016. Following Army United’s relegation from Thai League 1 in December 2016, he was released, bringing his two-year tenure with the club to a close.

=== Home United ===
Following his release from the Thai League side, Sunny signed for S.League side Home United on 6 January 2017. He was named club captain for the 2017 season.

==== Gainare Tottori trials ====
On 10 February 2017, Sunny joined Japanese third-tier (J3) club Gainare Tottori. He played for Gainare in two friendly matches.

=== Return to Army United ===
After the end of the 2017 S.League season, Sunny re-signed for Army United in December 2017 and played for them during the 2018 Thai League 2 season. He made his return to the club in the club's season opener against Nongbua Pitchaya on 10 February 2018, facing off against another Singaporean goalkeeper, Izwan Mahbud, who was also making his debut. On 30 June 2019, Sunny made his 100th appearance for the club in a 2–1 win over Kasetsart.

=== Lion City Sailors ===
After 2 seasons with Army United, Hassan penned a 2-year deal with Lion City Sailors in January 2020. In his first season, he kept 5 clean sheets in 11 matches before the league was halted due to the COVID-19 pandemic. Hassan went on to win the 2021 Singapore Premier League title with the club.

On 19 February 2022, Sunny helped the Sailors win the 2022 Singapore Community Shield. During the club's 2022 AFC Champions League group stage campaign, he kept 3 clean sheets in 6 matches. Sunny made his AFC Champions League debut on 15 April 2022 against J1 League club Urawa Red Diamonds. He left the club at the end of the season.

=== Albirex Niigata Singapore ===
On 16 December 2022, Albirex Niigata (S) announced it had signed Hassan on a 2-year contract until 2024, his sixth club in the Singapore Premier League. On 8 June 2023, he signed a 1-year contract extension until the end of the 2024–25 season. In his first season at the club, he won the 2023 Singapore Premier League title, becoming the first and only player in the league's history to win the league titles with 4 different clubs where he also won the league 'Golden Gloves' award with 9 clean sheets. On 23 June 2025, Hassan signed another 1-year contract extension that keep him for the remaining of the 2025–26 season.

== International career ==
=== Youth ===
Hassan kept goal for the Singapore U23 team that participated in the 2003 SEA Games in Vietnam. Hassan's first appearance for Singapore came in August 2003 during a friendly match against the Japanese U23. Hassan was part of the Singapore U23 squad at the 2007 SEA Games, which won the team a bronze medal.

=== Senior ===
Hassan had to wait until 18 February 2004 for his first cap for the Singapore national team, which came against India in a 2006 FIFA World Cup qualifiers. In January 2010, Hassan was selected to participate in the 2010 King's Cup, where he played in all three matches against Thailand, Denmark and Poland. On 9 August 2014, Hassan captained Singapore on the country's independence day in a goalless draw against Hong Kong. On 14 October, he captained Singapore to a 2–2 draw against Macau. On 13 June 2016, Hassan was chosen as the starting goalkeeper against two-time FIFA World Cup winners Argentina in a friendly match where he conceded two goals before being subbed out for Izwan Mahbud in the 50th minute. Hassan won his 75th cap for the Lions in early September 2018 against Mauritius. On 18 August 2024, Hassan retired from international football after 115 caps over 20 years.

==== Media headlines in Indonesia and Singapore for his performances ====
Hassan was selected for the 2020 AFF Championship that took place in December 2021, featuring in all of Singapore's games and making 20 saves throughout the entire tournament. On 25 December 2021, Hassan made 11 saves for the Lions against Indonesia but got sent off in the 118th minute of extra time after a last-man tackle on Irfan Jaya. The Lions lost 4–2 in the end. He was later voted into the "Team of the Tournament" for his performance in the entire tournament.

On 24 September 2022, 18 years on from that World Cup qualifier against India in Goa in his international debut, he earned his 100th cap against the same opponents in the 2022 VFF Tri-Nations Series.

During the 2026 FIFA World Cup qualification match against China at the Singapore National Stadium, Singapore was down by two goals when they conceded a penalty. Hassan made a penalty save, denying Wu Lei from scoring. The game later ended in a 2–2 draw.

==== Media headlines in China ====
During the 2026 FIFA World Cup qualification match against Thailand, where the opponents were one goal short of qualifying for the next round, Hassan performed 11 saves. Although Singapore ultimately lost to Thailand 3–1, the result meant that Thailand did not progress to the next round, and China, the next runner-up in the group, qualified instead.

Hassan's performance during the match impressed many Chinese viewers and received significant publicity on Chinese social media platforms. Many Chinese football fans complimented his saves and showed their appreciation and support by patronizing his nasi padang stalls and sending him money via the QR code displayed for payment at his stalls. He was also mobbed by fans during a family trip to Shanghai following the game.

==== Retirement ====
On 18 August 2024, Hassan announced his retirement from the national team via an Instagram post. Hassan continued to play for Albirex Niigata in the Singapore Premier League.

=== Others ===
==== Singapore Selection squad ====
Hassan was selected as part of the Singapore Selection squad for the Sultan of Selangor's Cup held on 6 May 2017.

== Sponsorship and media ==
Hassan has a sponsorship deal with sportswear and equipment supplier Puma.

"I am happy to receive such recognition, but I was simply doing my job [at the game between Singapore and Thailand]. In terms of results, the game was not something to be proud of. However, for me, it feels great to receive such recognition from another country."

— Hassan being grateful for the support he received from Chinese football fans

Although Singapore lost to Thailand 1-3 at the last match in 2026 FIFA World Cup qualifiers second round, but by Hassan's performances by saving lots of goals in this match and this result leaded to China not finish behind Thailand on goal difference and qualify for the third round, he went viral on numerous Chinese social media platforms, with his Nasi Padang stall being visited by numerous Chinese fans and tourists in a show of support. Numerous monetary donations were also made to the stall by Chinese fans. Singapore President Tharman Shanmugaratnam also praised Hassan for his performance and recognition on social media.

Following a scam attempt involving the QR code at his Nasi Padang stall, in a social media post, Hassan asked his fans to stop sending money via that QR code. Hassan said he would be donating the money already sent to charity, as it did not belong to him; he stated that he was "doing his part for the community".

In June 2024, Hassan flew to Shanghai at the invitation of real estate firm CapitaLand, where he and his family were mobbed by Chinese football fans. Hassan made unscheduled appearances at three CapitaLand malls in Shanghai and also visited the children's football club HiKicker Youth FC. While being interviewed by China News Agency in Shanghai, Hassan revealed that he is of at least one-eighth Chinese ethnicity.

In May 2025, Hassan flew to United States where he was invited by e-commerce platform Shoplazza to promote the Seattle-based United Sports FC for their youth development including free clinics, charity events, and mentorship sessions designed to inspire the next generation.

== Personal life ==
According to an interview, Hassan started playing football competitively when he was 11, captaining his school, May Primary School. He later went on to represent the Braddell Secondary School football team. Hassan started playing football as a midfielder, only switching to playing as a goalkeeper due to an asthma attack he suffered when he was 12. He also quipped that his happiest football memory was that, back in 1999, he scored the winning goal from the halfway line in a game that ended 2–1. Hassan has stated that his favorite goalkeepers are Manuel Neuer and Joe Hart.

Hassan owns two Nasi Padang stalls. He opened a stall in October 2021. On 22 August 2023, he opened his second stall. In July 2024, he donated $10,000 to the Muhammadiyah Welfare Home, a children’s shelter in Singapore, helping fund its 2024 CharityFest.According to interviews with China News Agency, Hassan revealed that he is of at least one-eighth Chinese ethnicity, "My father's grandpa... my great-grandpa is Chinese." In February 2025, he launched his own minimalist apparel line, Has & Co., debuting at the FOMO Weekend Market.

== Career statistics ==
=== Club ===
As of match played on 26 October 2026.

Club	Season	S.League		Singapore Cup		Singapore Community Shield		Asia		Total	
Club	Season	Apps	Goals	Apps	Goals	Apps	Goals	Apps	Goals	Apps	Goals
Geylang International	2003	31	0	-	-	-	-	—		31	0
Geylang International	Total	31	0	0	0	0	0	0	0	31	0
Young Lions	2004	??	0	-	-	-	-	—		??	0
Young Lions	2005	??	0	-	-	-	-	—		??	0
Young Lions	Total	43	0	0	0	0	0	0	0	43	0
Geylang United	2006	29	0	1	-	-	-	—		30	0
Geylang United	2007	23	0	-	-	-	-	—		23	0
Geylang United	Total	52	0	1	0	0	0	0	0	53	0
Tampines Rovers	2008	18	0	5	-	-	-	-	-	23	0
Tampines Rovers	2009	31	0	-	-	-	-	—		31	0
Tampines Rovers	2010	30	0	6	0	-	-	—		36	0
Tampines Rovers	2011	13	0	0	0	-	-	7	0	20	0
Tampines Rovers	Total	92	0	11	0	0	0	7	0	110	0
Warriors	2012	4	0	0	0	-	-	—		4	0
Warriors	2013	24	0	1	0	1	0	6	0	32	0
Warriors	2014	25	0	1	0	-	-	—		26	0
Warriors	Total	53	0	2	0	1	0	6	0	61	0
Club	Season	Thai League T1		Thai FA Cup		Thai League Cup		Asia		Total	
Army United	2015	26	0	-	-	-	-	—		26	0
Army United	2016	28	0	-	-	-	-	—		28	0
Army United	Total	54	0	0	0	0	0	0	0	54	0
Club	Season	S.League		Singapore Cup		Singapore League Cup		Asia		Total	
Home United	2017	19	0	4	0	2	0	9	0	34	0
Home United	Total	19	0	4	0	2	0	9	0	34	0
Club	Season	Thai League T2		Thai FA Cup		Thai League Cup		Asia		Total	
Army United	2018	23	0	1	-	-	-	—		24	0
Army United	2019	26	0	-	-	-	-	—		26	0
Army United	Total	26	0	1	0	0	0	0	0	51	0
Club	Season	S.League		Singapore Cup		Community Shield		Asia		Total	
Lion City Sailors	2020	11	0	0	0	0	0	—		11	0
Lion City Sailors	2021	20	0	0	0	0	0	0	0	20	0
Lion City Sailors	2022	20	0	0	0	1	0	6	0	27	0
Lion City Sailors	Total	51	0	0	0	1	0	6	0	58	0
Albirex Niigata (S)	2023	19	0	4	0	1	0	—		24	0
Albirex Niigata (S)	2024–25	30	0	3	0	1	0	—		34	0
Albirex Niigata (S)	2025–26	19	0	6	0	0	0	—		25	0
Albirex Niigata (S)	2026–27	5	0	0	0	0	0	—		5	0
Albirex Niigata (S)	Total	73	0	13	0	2	0	0	0	88	0
Career Total		450	0	23	0	6	0	28	0	506	0

- Young Lions are ineligible for qualification to AFC competitions in their respective leagues.

== Honours ==
=== Club ===
==== Tampines Rovers ====
- S.League: 2011
- Singapore Community Shield: 2011

==== Warriors ====
- S.League: 2014
- Singapore Cup: 2012

==== Lion City Sailors ====
- Singapore Premier League: 2021
- Singapore Community Shield: 2022

==== Albirex Niigata (S) ====
- Singapore Premier League: 2023
- Singapore Community Shield: 2023

=== International ===
- AFF Championship: 2004, 2007
- Southeast Asian Games Bronze Medal: 2007

=== Individual ===
- S.League Golden Gloves: 2009
- Singapore Premier League Golden Gloves: 2023
- S.League Player of the Year: 2014
- 2020 AFF Championship: Team of the Tournament

== See also ==
- List of men's footballers with 100 or more international caps
- Football in Singapore
