= National Stadium, Singapore =

Multi-purpose stadium in Singapore

Coordinates: 1°18′16″N 103°52′27″E

Singapore National Stadium
- Stadium Negara Singapura (Malay) 新加坡国家体育场 (Chinese) சிங்கப்பூர் தேசிய அரங்கம் (Tamil)
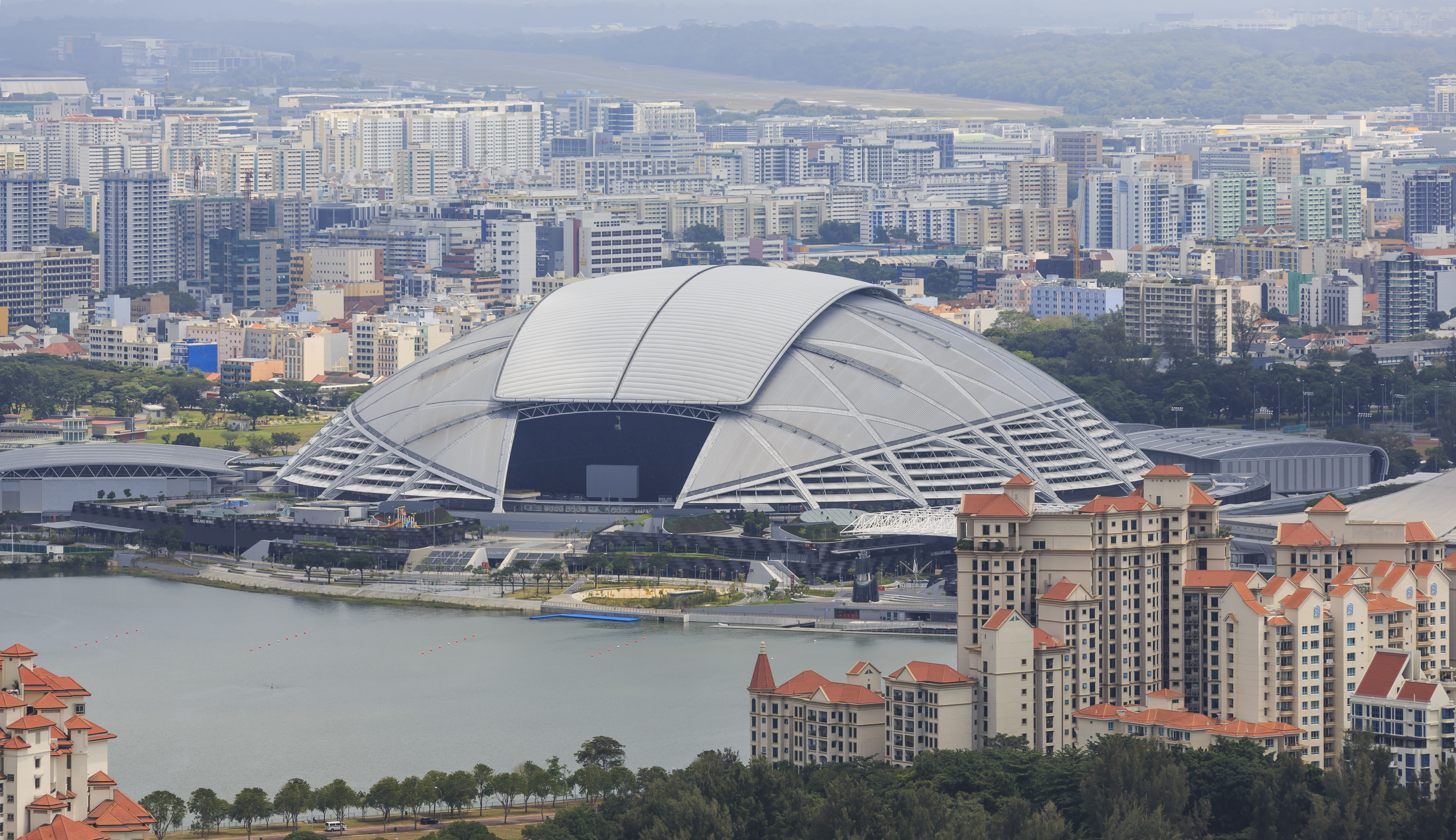
- Interactive map of Singapore National Stadium
- Full name: Singapore National Stadium
- Address: 1 Stadium Drive, Singapore 397629
- Location: Kallang, Singapore
- Owner: Sport Singapore
- Operator: Dragages Singapore Pte. Ltd.
- Capacity: 55,000 (Association football and rugby); 52,000 (cricket); 50,000 (athletics)
- Roof: Retractable
- Surface: Eclipse Stabilised Turf
- Scoreboard: Yes
- Record attendance: 63,000 (concert, Taylor Swift, The Eras Tour, March 2024); 52,897 (football, Manchester United vs Inter Milan, 20 July 2019)
- Public transit: CC6 Stadium; EW10 Kallang; TE23 Tanjong Rhu

Construction
- Groundbreaking: 29 September 2010; 16 years ago
- Opened: 30 June 2014; 12 years ago
- Cost: S$1.87 billion
- Architects: Arup (sports venues), DP Architects (non-sport venues, QP), Aecom (landscape)
- Structural engineer: Arup

Tenants
- Singapore national football team (2014–present); Singapore Sevens (2016–present)

Website
- www.sportshub.com.sg

The Singapore National Stadium is a multi-purpose stadium in Kallang, Singapore, and serves as the country's national stadium. Opened in 2014, it was built on the site of the former National Stadium, which stood from 1973 to 2010. The 55,000-seat facility is the centrepiece of The Kallang, a sports, entertainment and recreation district that also includes the nearby Singapore Indoor Stadium, OCBC Aquatic Centre, OCBC Arena, Kallang Wave Mall and other public sporting facilities.

One of the largest domed structures in the world, the stadium has a naturally ventilated design with a retractable roof and configurations for football, rugby, athletics and cricket. Its roof is made of insulated metal to reflect sunlight, and its bowl-cooling system was designed to provide comfort in Singapore's tropical climate while using less energy than a conventional fully air-conditioned stadium. The stadium is the home ground of the Singapore national football team, served as the main venue of the 2015 Southeast Asian Games, and has hosted AFF Championship matches in 2014, 2018, 2020 and 2022. It has also hosted non-sporting events, including concerts, the Singapore National Day Parade and religious gatherings.

== History ==
In 2007, the Singapore government accepted bids for a project to build a new National Stadium and an accompanying sports and recreation district, including an aquatics centre. Alpine Mayreder proposed a design inspired by Munich's Allianz Arena, Singapore Gold proposed a design known as "Premier Park", which would have featured a retractable roof that could be used as a projection screen, while the Singapore Sports Hub Consortium (SSHC) proposed a design known as the "Cool Dome", a ventilated, horseshoe-inspired stadium with a retractable roof.

On 19 January 2008, the government named SSHC as its preferred bidder for the Sports Hub project and stadium, with construction slated to be completed by 2011. Minister of Community Development, Youth and Sports Vivian Balakrishnan stated that the SSHC proposal was the "strongest in offering a comprehensive sporting calendar", and "displayed significant strengths in programming, team culture and partnership, functionality and layout".

Construction of the stadium began in 2010, after delays caused by the 2008 financial crisis and rising construction costs. By September 2011, piling and foundation works had been completed, and construction of the steelwork for the stadium's fixed roof had begun. In July 2013, the final primary steel 'runway truss' for the roof was installed, marking the completion of steelwork on the National Stadium's fixed roof ahead of the retractable roof installation. The stadium was scheduled for completion in April 2014. In February 2014, Sports Hub CEO Philippe Collin Delavaud announced that it would miss the deadline and would not open until June 2014.

The stadium's first sporting event was the inaugural World Club 10s rugby tens tournament in June 2014.

=== Ownership and management ===
The stadium was developed as part of the Singapore Sports Hub under a public-private partnership between Sport Singapore and SportsHub Pte Ltd. Under the agreement, SportsHub Pte Ltd was engaged to design, build, finance and operate the wider Sports Hub, while Sport Singapore made annual payments after the facility opened. The partnership was originally due to expire in 2035, but in June 2022 the government announced that Sport Singapore would take over ownership and management of the Sports Hub early. The handover was completed on 9 December 2022, with Kallang Alive Sport Management Co Pte Ltd taking over management of the precinct.

The government said the takeover was intended to make the Sports Hub more accessible for community, sporting and entertainment use, while keeping it commercially sustainable. In November 2025, the wider Singapore Sports Hub precinct was renamed The Kallang, with management rebranded as The Kallang Group.

== Design ==
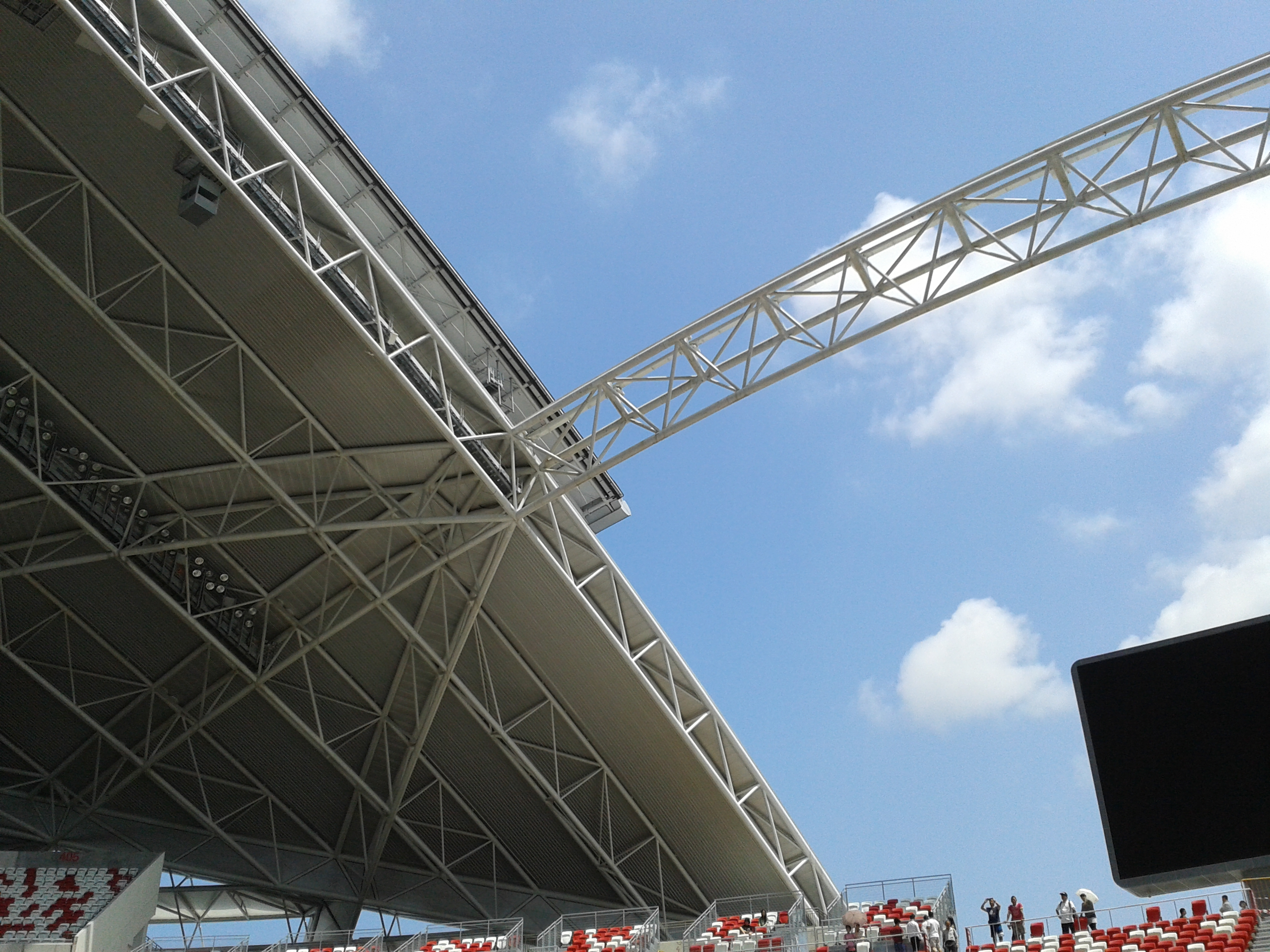
Retractable roof of the stadium

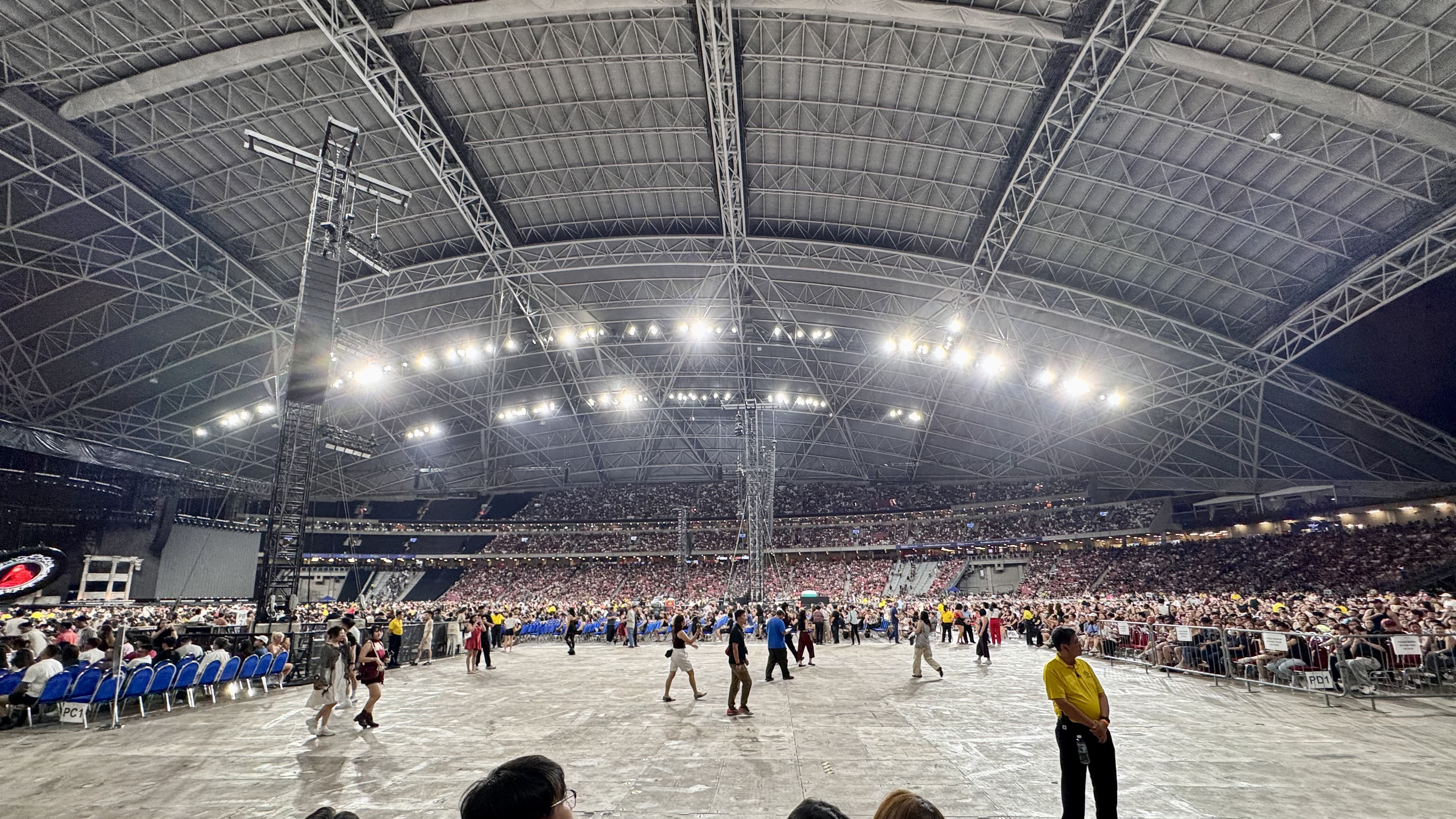
The interior of the stadium in 2025.

The stadium features a 75,000 m^{2} (810,000 sq ft), 83 m (272 ft)-tall steel dome with a retractable roof, which was described as the largest dome structure in the world. Because of Singapore's tropical climate, the roof is designed to reflect sunlight and insulate the interior, while natural airflow cools spectator areas with less energy than a venue of comparable size.

The stadium can be configured for football, rugby, athletics and cricket. In its football and rugby configuration, the lowest tier of seating can be moved closer to the pitch, covering the running track. It takes approximately 48 hours to reconfigure the seating for an event.

The retractable roof incorporates an LED lighting system that can function as a large screen visible from inside and outside the stadium.

=== Architecture and climate response ===
The stadium was designed by Arup, DP Architects and AECOM as part of the wider 35-hectare Sports Hub masterplan. DP Architects described the project as a sports-driven urban precinct intended to remain active even when major events are not being held, combining elite sport with daily public use and waterfront activity. The stadium's roof and surrounding promenade provide shade and rain protection, while adjacent retail and community spaces link it to the other venues in the precinct.

A key engineering feature is the stadium's use of targeted spectator cooling rather than conventional whole-volume air-conditioning. Cool air is supplied to seating areas, creating localised comfort pockets around spectators and reducing energy use compared with overhead cooling systems for a venue of similar scale.

=== Playing surface ===
The stadium initially used Desso GrassMaster, which consists of natural grass interwoven with synthetic fibres, as its playing surface. After problems with the pitch's quality culminated in the New Zealand All Blacks cancelling a rugby match at the stadium during a November 2014 tour because of safety concerns, in May 2015 the GrassMaster surface was replaced by Eclipse Stabilised Turf—a similar hybrid surface produced by Australian company HG Turf.

Singapore Sports Hub CEO Oon Jin Teik stated that the stadium's unique microclimate had created additional challenges in maintaining the GrassMaster pitch.

== Transport ==
=== Mass rapid transit ===
The stadium is located above the underground Stadium MRT station on the Circle Line. Trains arrive every five to six minutes during off-peak hours, and two to three minutes during peak hours and event days. Other nearby MRT stations are Kallang MRT station on the East–West Line, accessible by a sheltered walkway, and Tanjong Rhu MRT station on the Thomson–East Coast Line, across the Tanjong Rhu Footbridge.

=== Buses and taxis ===
Bus stops are located around the Sports Hub complex along Stadium Walk, Stadium Boulevard and Nicoll Highway, with buses serving nearby districts and the city. Taxi stands are also available near the National Stadium, Singapore Indoor Stadium and Leisure Park Kallang.

== Notable events ==
=== Sports ===
==== SEA Games ====
The stadium was one of the venues for the 2015 Southeast Asian Games, hosting the opening and closing ceremonies, athletics and football.

==== Football ====
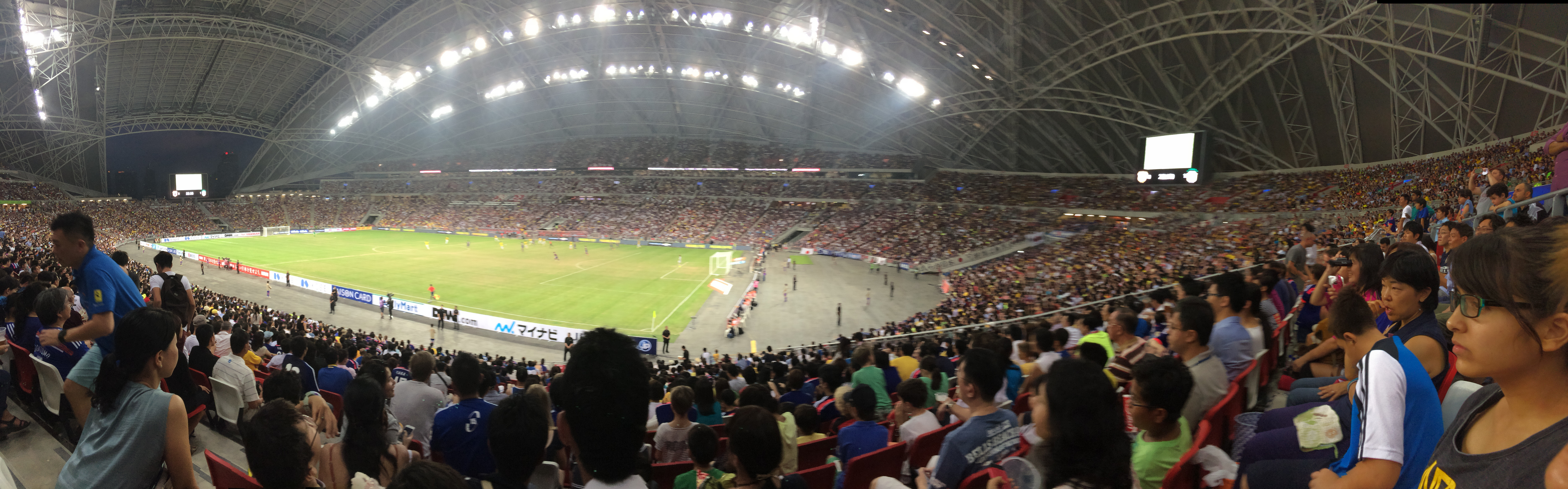
The stadium hosting an international friendly between Brazil and Japan in 2014.

The first football match held at the stadium was a friendly between Singapore Selection XI and Juventus in August 2014. The October 2014 friendly between Brazil and Japan drew the stadium's first sell-out crowd of 55,000. It also hosted the 2014 AFF Suzuki Cup in November 2014. In 2015, it hosted the Premier League Asia Trophy, featuring Premier League clubs Arsenal, Everton, Stoke City, and Singapore Selection XI.

The stadium hosted International Champions Cup matches in 2017, when it staged the ICC Singapore tournament between Chelsea, Bayern Munich and Inter Milan, as well as three matches in 2018 and two in 2019.

During the 2018 AFF Championship, Singapore played two group-stage home matches at the stadium.

As part of the Brazil Global Tour, Brazil played a series of friendlies against Senegal on 10 October 2019 and Nigeria on 13 October 2019 respectively.

On 15 July 2022, the stadium hosted the Singapore Trophy, a preseason friendly between Premier League clubs Liverpool and Crystal Palace. In May 2023, it was announced that the stadium would host the "Festival of Football" in late-July, which would feature friendlies between Tottenham Hotspur and AS Roma, Liverpool and Leicester City, and Liverpool and Bayern Munich. AS Roma were later replaced by Lion City Sailors of the Singapore Premier League, after the club was forced to pull out of the match after a pair of friendlies in South Korea were cancelled due to financial issues with their promoter. In April 2025, the Singapore Tourism Board and TEG Sport announced a long-term deal to continue the series in alternating years through 2029, with the 2025 event featuring Arsenal playing Newcastle United and AC Milan.

Notable football matches held at the Singapore National Stadium
Date	Home	Result	Away	Tournament	Attendance	Notes
16 August 2014	Singapore Selection XI	0–5	(Italy) Juventus	Friendly	27,338	First official match at the New National Stadium
14 October 2014	Japan	0–4	Brazil	Brazil Global Tour	51,577	
15 July 2015 (18:00)	(England) Everton	0–0 (5–4 p)	(England) Stoke City	2015 Premier League Asia Trophy	17,843	
15 July 2015 (20:30)	Singapore Selection XI	0–4	(England) Arsenal	2015 Premier League Asia Trophy	29,867	
18 July 2015 (18:00)	(England) Stoke City	2–0	Singapore Selection XI	2015 Premier League Asia Trophy	25,000	
18 July 2015 (20:30)	(England) Everton	1–3	(England) Arsenal	2015 Premier League Asia Trophy	52,107	
12 November 2015	Japan	3–0	Singapore	2018 FIFA World Cup qualification – AFC second round	33,868	
10 May 2016	(Singapore) Tampines Rovers	1–0	(Malaysia) Selangor	2016 AFC Cup group stage	11,875	
13 June 2017	Singapore	0–6	Argentina	FAS 125th Year (Friendly)	28,000	
25 July 2017	(England) Chelsea	2–3	(Germany) Bayern Munich	2017 International Champions Cup	48,522	
27 July 2017	(Germany) Bayern Munich	0–2	(Italy) Inter Milan	2017 International Champions Cup	23,388	
29 July 2017	(England) Chelsea	1–2	(Italy) Inter Milan	2017 International Champions Cup	32,547	Inter Milan is the 2017 ICC Singapore Champions
31 March 2018	Albirex Niigata Singapore	2–1	(Singapore) Tampines Rovers	2018 Singapore Community Shield	18,942	It is the league's first season after rebranding from the S.League to the Singapore Premier League.
26 July 2018	(Spain) Atletico Madrid	1–1 (3–1 p)	(England) Arsenal	2018 International Champions Cup	23,095	
28 July 2018	(England) Arsenal	5–1	(France) Paris Saint-Germain	2018 International Champions Cup	50,308	
30 July 2018	(France) Paris Saint-Germain	3–2	(Spain) Atletico Madrid	2018 International Champions Cup	50,038	
20 July 2019	(England) Manchester United	1–0	(Italy) Inter Milan	2019 International Champions Cup	52,897	Record attendance match
21 July 2019	(Italy) Juventus	2–3	(England) Tottenham Hotspur	2019 International Champions Cup	50,443	
10 October 2019	Brazil	1–1	Senegal	Brazil Global Tour	20,621	
13 October 2019	Brazil	1–1	Nigeria	Brazil Global Tour	20,385	
29 December 2021	Indonesia	0–4	Thailand	2020 AFF Championship Final First leg	6,290	Thailand won 6–2 on aggregate.
1 January 2022	Thailand	2–2	Indonesia	2020 AFF Championship Final Second leg	7,429	Thailand won 6–2 on aggregate.
15 July 2022	(England) Liverpool	2–0	(England) Crystal Palace	Standard Chartered Singapore Trophy (Friendly)	50,217	
26 July 2023	(Singapore) Lion City Sailors	1–5	(England) Tottenham Hotspur	Tiger Cup (Friendly)	25,095	
30 July 2023	(England) Liverpool	4–0	(England) Leicester City	Standard Chartered Singapore Trophy (Friendly)	28,597	
2 August 2023	(England) Liverpool	3–4	(Germany) Bayern Munich	Standard Chartered Singapore Trophy (Friendly)	49,983	
21 March 2024	Singapore	2–2	China	2026 FIFA World Cup qualification	28,414	Singapore made a historic comeback after going 2–0 down, with goalkeeper Hassan Sunny saving a penalty
6 June 2024	Singapore	0–7	South Korea	2026 FIFA World Cup qualification	49,097	Record attendance for Singapore national football team game
11 December 2024	Singapore	2–1	Cambodia	2024 ASEAN Championship	12,391	Group stage
17 December 2024	Singapore	2–4	Thailand	2024 ASEAN Championship	22,611	Group stage
23 July 2025	(England) Arsenal	1–0 (5–6 p)	(Italy) AC Milan	Singapore Festival of Football	22,813	
27 July 2025	(England) Arsenal	3–2	(England) Newcastle United	Singapore Festival of Football	38,720	
13 November 2026	Singapore	1–4	Paraguay	Mizuho Blue Challenge 2026 Singapore	14,316	
14 November 2026	Japan	3–2	Brazil	Mizuho Blue Challenge 2026 Singapore	38,688	
17 November 2026	Singapore	0–7	Brazil	Mizuho Blue Challenge 2026 Singapore	19,826	
17 November 2026	Japan	1–2	Paraguay	Mizuho Blue Challenge 2026 Singapore	19,826	

==== Rugby ====
The stadium's first event was the inaugural World Club 10s tournament in June 2014.

The stadium hosts the Singapore Sevens, a stop on the SVNS series.

=== Concerts ===
Concerts by artists based outside Asia are highlighted in light blue.

Concerts held at the Singapore National Stadium
Date	Artist	Event	Note
2014
5 July	Stefanie Sun	Kepler World Tour	
24 October	Mariah Carey	The Elusive Chanteuse Show	First foreign artist to perform at the National Stadium
27 December	Jay Chou	Opus Jay World Tour	
2015
11 March	One Direction	On the Road Again Tour	
7 August	Various (including JJ Lin, Stefanie Sun, Lang Lang, and Apl.de.ap)	Sing50: Celebrating 50 Years of Singapore Music	Attendance: 41,300
2016
9 January	A-mei	aMEI/AMIT UTOPIA World Tour	
28 February	Madonna	Rebel Heart Tour	
3 September	Jay Chou	The Invincible World Tour	
2017
31 March & 1 April	Coldplay	A Head Full of Dreams Tour	First artist in history to perform two shows on a single tour at the National Stadium.
26 August	Foo Fighters	Concrete and Gold Tour	
21 October	Backstreet Boys	Larger Than Life Tour	
2018
6 January	Jay Chou	THE INVINCIBLE 2 JAY CHOU CONCERT TOUR	
2 June	Mayday	Life Tour	
27 October	Jason Mraz	Good Vibes with Jason Mraz	
2019
19 January	BTS	BTS World Tour: Love Yourself	
7 March	Maroon 5	Red Pill Blues Tour	
26 April	Ed Sheeran	÷ Tour	
10 August	Westlife	The Twenty Tour	
30 November & 1 December	U2	The Joshua Tree Tour 2019	
21 & 22 December	JJ Lin	Sanctuary 2.0 World Tour 林俊杰《圣所2.0》世界巡回演唱会	
2020
10 & 11 January	Jay Chou	Carnival World Tour 周杰倫嘉年華世界巡迴演唱會	
2022
21 August	Billie Eilish	Happier Than Ever, The World Tour	
4 & 5 November	JJ Lin	JJ20 World Tour 《JJ 林俊傑 JJ20 世界巡迴演唱會》	
12 November	Guns N' Roses	We're F'N' Back! Tour	
28 November	Maroon 5	World Tour 2022	
3 December	Mayday	Fly to 2022 World Tour 《五月天好好好想見到你 Mayday Fly to 2022 新加坡演唱會》	
17 & 18 December	Jay Chou	Carnival World Tour 周杰倫嘉年華世界巡迴演唱會	
2023
16 February	Red Hot Chili Peppers	Global Stadium Tour	
17 March	Harry Styles	Love On Tour	
13 & 14 May	Blackpink	Born Pink World Tour	
2024
13, 14 January	Mayday	NOWHERE Re: Live 2024 Tour	
23, 24, 26, 27, 30 & 31 January	Coldplay	Music of the Spheres World Tour	First artist in history to perform three, four, five and six shows on a single tour at the National Stadium. Total attendance: 321,113.
16 February	Ed Sheeran	+–=÷× Tour	
2, 3, 4, 7, 8 & 9 March	Taylor Swift	The Eras Tour	First solo artist in history to schedule three, four, five and six shows on a single tour at the National Stadium. Record attendance of 63,000 was set on final night. Total attendance: 368,000.
3, 5 & 6 April	Bruno Mars	Bruno Mars Live	
31 August	A. R. Rahman	A Rahman Rhapsody	
28 September	Stray Kids	Dominate World Tour	
11, 12 & 13 October	Jay Chou	Carnival World Tour	
28 & 29 December	JJ Lin	JJ20 Final Lap World Tour	
2025
11 & 12 January	Mayday	5525 Back to That Day Tour	
25 & 26 January	Seventeen	Right Here World Tour	Attendance: 74,000
14 & 15 February	Joker Xue	Extraterrestrial World Tour	
1 March	G.E.M.	I Am Gloria World Tour	
18, 19, 21 & 24 May	Lady Gaga	Lion City Mayhem	Total attendance: 192,807.
28, 29 & 30 November	Blackpink	Deadline World Tour	
2026
7 March	Seventeen	New_ World Tour	
23 May	G.E.M.	I Am Gloria World Tour 2.0	
25 September	Post Malone	Big Ass Stadium Tour	
2 & 3 October	The Weeknd	After Hours til Dawn Tour	
17 & 18 October	BIGBANG	XX: Cosmos World Tour	
25 November	Guns N' Roses	World Tour 2026	
17, 19, 20, 22 December	BTS	Arirang World Tour	
2027
8, 9 & 10 January	Jay Chou	Carnival II World Tour	
12 February	Maroon 5	Asia 2027 in Singapore	
20 February	Yoasobi	Super Planet Tour	
14 March	ENHYPEN	Blood Saga Tour	
13, 14, 17 & 18 April	Bruno Mars	The Romantic Tour	

=== National Day Parade ===
On 9 August 2016, the new National Stadium hosted Singapore's National Day Parade (NDP). The event had frequently been held at the old National Stadium, and had temporarily moved to The Float at Marina Bay, a temporary venue on Marina Bay built to host outdoor sports and cultural events while the new National Stadium was under construction. The stadium's design required changes to the event, including the traditional military flypast and fireworks being obstructed by the dome, armoured military vehicles being unable to drive on the stadium's tracks, and the Red Lions being unable to parachute into the dome due to safety concerns. The parade therefore incorporated different features, such as light shows (including a segment featuring models of Singaporean landmarks illuminated with projection mapping effects), large "puppets", and other artistic presentations.

The event received mixed reactions because of its higher cost compared with the parade held at The Float. Under the contract between the Sports Hub and the Singapore Government, NDP organisers were allowed 45 days of free annual use of the venue. However, technicians and performers reported that the time frame needed to be extended to 80 days. The Sports Hub requested an additional $26 million, which was reportedly reduced to $10 million.

In October 2017, it was announced that The Float would be redeveloped as a permanent venue known as NS Square, and would serve as the primary venue for the NDP when the parade was not held at the Padang every five years. The decision raised questions over whether the costs of renting the stadium would diminish the legacy that the former National Stadium had as a site for community events. Conversely, it was argued that not hosting the NDP at the new National Stadium would free up its schedule for major international sporting events, especially during the summer months. Bids to host the Asia Masters Athletics Championships and the Merlion Cup at the stadium had also previously been stalled by costs demanded by the facility.

Organisers raised the possibility of hosting the NDP at the stadium again in 2024 due to the construction of NS Square, but ultimately chose to host the 2024 and 2025 parades at the Padang instead. In August 2025, it was announced that the 2026 parade would be hosted by the new National Stadium. At the conclusion of the 2026 NDP, while it garnered positive reception as compared to the 2016 iteration, MINDEF announced that the following year's parade would return to the Padang.

=== Religious gatherings ===
In May 2019, the National Stadium hosted the Celebration of Hope, a three-day evangelistic event led by Rennis Ponniah.

On 12 September 2024, Pope Francis celebrated Mass at the National Stadium as part of a tour of Southeast Asia and Oceania. The event was attended by around 50,000 visitors.

== Future development ==
The stadium is part of the Kallang Alive precinct plan, a wider redevelopment intended to strengthen Kallang's role as Singapore's main sports and entertainment district. The plan includes new and upgraded public spaces around the precinct, the relocation of the Singapore Sports School to Kallang, and the development of a new indoor arena beside the existing Singapore Indoor Stadium. Although these projects concern the wider precinct rather than the stadium building itself, they are expected to affect the stadium's role as the anchor venue for major events at The Kallang.

== See also ==
- List of Southeast Asia stadiums by capacity
- List of stadiums in Singapore
- Sport in Singapore
