= Jalan Besar Stadium =

Stadium in Singapore

- Stadium Jalan Besar (Malay) 惹兰勿刹体育场 (Chinese) ஜாலான் புசார் ஸ்டேடியம் (Tamil)
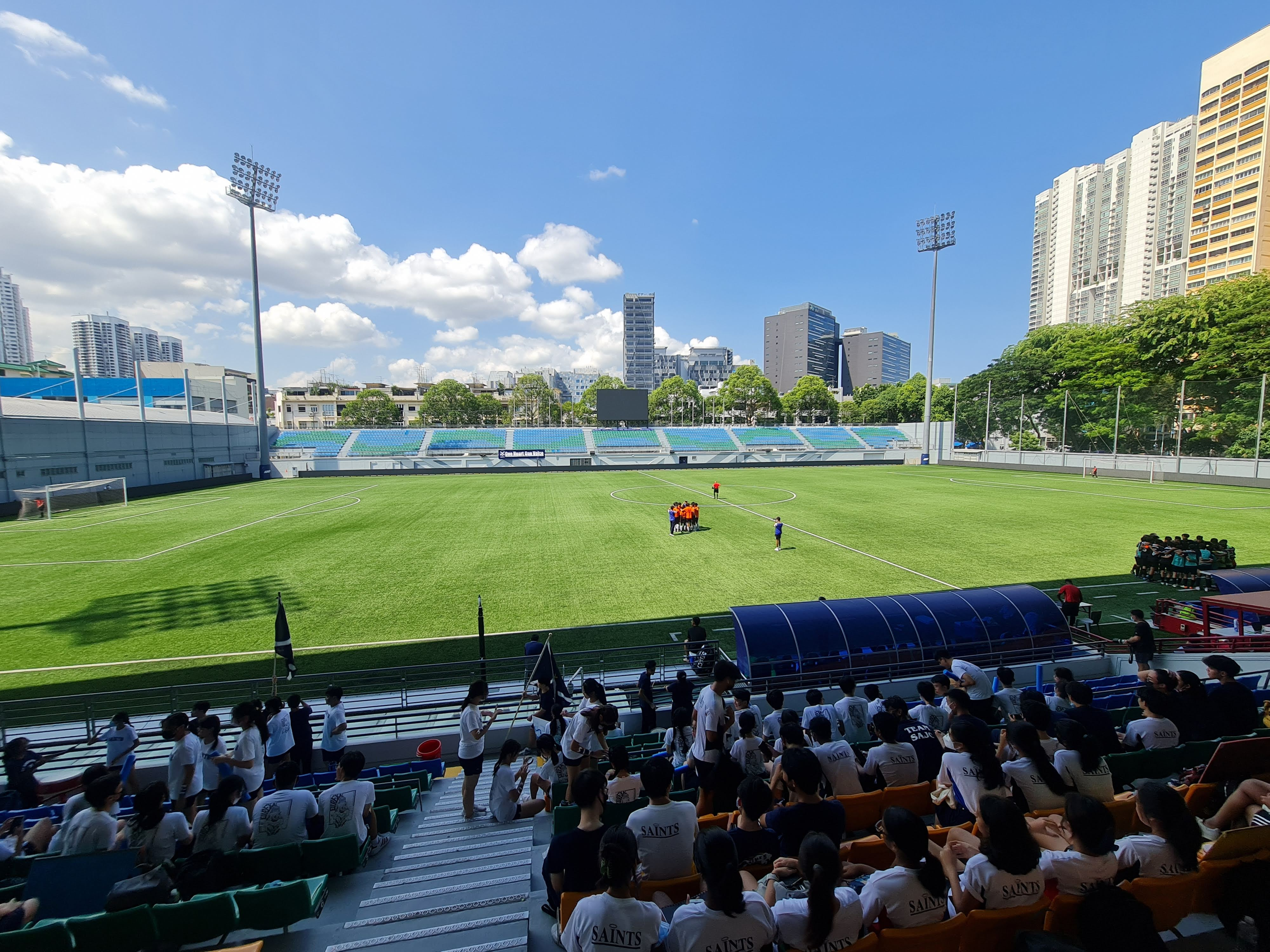
- Jalan Besar Stadium, facing the gallery stand
- Interactive map of Jalan Besar Stadium
- Full name: Jalan Besar ActiveSG Stadium
- Address: 100 Tyrwhitt Road, Singapore 207542
- Location: Jalan Besar, Singapore
- Coordinates: 1°18′36″N 103°51′37″E
- Owner: Sport Singapore
- Operator: Sport Singapore
- Capacity: 6,500
- Surface: Grass
- Record attendance: 16,000 (Singapore FA vs South China AA, 12 September 1951)
- Field size: 98 x 63.5 metres (107 x 69 yards)
- Public transit: EW11 Lavender; DT23 Bendemeer

Construction
- Opened: 26 December 1929; 96 years ago
- Renovated: 1999–2003

Tenants
- Singapore national football team (1932–present); Young Lions (2003–present); LionsXII (2011–2015); Lion City Sailors (selected matches); Lion City Sailors FC (women) (selected matches)

Website
- https://www.myactivesg.com/Facilities/jalan-besar-stadium

Jalan Besar Stadium, officially the Jalan Besar ActiveSG Stadium, is a football stadium located in Kallang, Singapore. The stadium is part of the Jalan Besar Sports and Recreation Centre, a community sports facility.

It is the home ground of the Singapore Premier League club Young Lions. The stadium is also used as an alternative home ground to the National Stadium by the Singapore national football team. The Football Association of Singapore (FAS) is also headquartered within the stadium.

== Location ==
Jalan Besar Stadium is located along Tyrwhitt Road, within the close proximity of the major road Jalan Besar, hence its name.

== History ==
=== Opening ===
The original stadium was opened on Boxing Day 1929 by president of the Municipal Commission of Singapore, R. J. Farrer, with the nearby Farrer Park named after him. It is considered to be the birthplace of Singapore football. Malaya Cup matches were played at the stadium from 1932 to 1966, and Malaysia Cup matches from 1967 to 1973.

=== Japanese occupation ===
During the Japanese Occupation, the stadium was one of the Sook Ching mass screening sites orchestrated by Japanese officials. During the war, the stadium remained opened and was also used as a language centre to teach the Japanese language to locals.

=== Post-war ===
On 12 November 1956, the United States men's national soccer team (USMNT) for the 1956 Summer Olympics played an exhibition game against the Singapore team at the Jalan Besar Stadium.

On 30 May 1964, a mass rally led by Singaporean statesman Lee Kuan Yew was held at the stadium to mourn and honour the death of Indian statesman Jawaharlal Nehru, whom Lee considered "a staunch friend" during the decolonisation era after World War II. Nehru had previously spoke at the stadium when he visited the country in June 1950, calling for "peace and conciliation" in the region while decolonisation was underway.

The stadium was also host to many major events in Singapore's history, such as being the venue for the first Singapore Youth Festival in 1955, the first Singapore Armed Forces Day in 1969, and the 1984 National Day Parade.

=== Redevelopment ===
In December 1999, the original field was closed for rebuilding. The new stadium was opened later in June 2003 with a seating capacity of 6,000. The position of the pitch was retained in the exact position as the previous stadium.

SAFFC (Now Warriors) played their 2009 and 2010 AFC Champions League group stage matches at the stadium which saw them face Suwon Samsung Bluewings from South Korea, Kashima Antlers from Japan and Shanghai Shenhua from China for the 2009 tournament.

The following year in the 2010 tournament, SAFFC was drawn in a group with Suwon Samsung Bluewings, Gamba Osaka from Japan and Henan Jianye from China. On 13 April 2010, they became the first Singapore club to achieve a win in the competition, against Henan Jianye in a 2–1 win which surprisingly SAFFC finished in third place above Henan Jianye with 4 points.

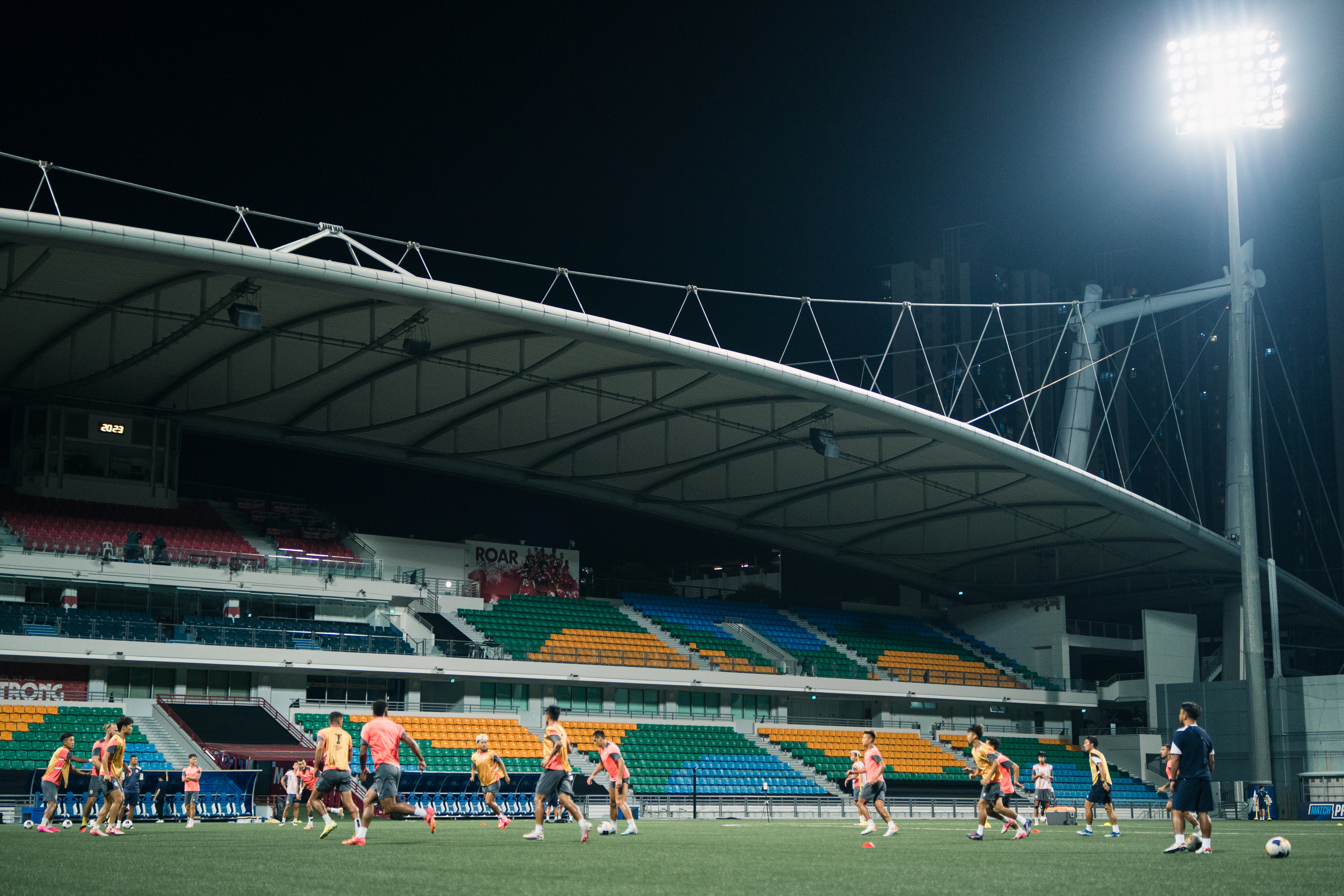
The stadium's main stand

On 24 July 2010, Burnley played against a Singapore Selection XI side in the FIS Asian Challenge Cup held at the stadium. The Singapore side narrowly lost the game 0–1. That same year during the 2010 Summer Youth Olympics held in Singapore, the stadium was the designated venue for both the boys' and girls' football tournament.

In 2012, a local fans club, Kingsmen, sponsored a temporary stand, King George's Stand, for the stadium. This increased the stadium's capacity from 6,500 to 8,000. The final extension for the use of the temporary seating structures expired on 29 August 2015, and the dismantling and reinstatement works would commence in November.

On 22 May 2013, Spanish football club Atlético Madrid played against a Singapore Selection side in the Peter Lim Charity Cup held at the stadium. The game ended 0–2 to the away team.

On 4 October 2013, Fulham U21 travelled to Singapore to play a friendly against Singaporean club, Woodlands Wellington in a thrashing 7–0 defeat for the Rams.

In 2015, after dismantling the King George's Stand, the capacity of the stadium was reduced back to 6,500.

On 24 November 2022, As part of BVB Southeast Asia Tour, Borussia Dortmund played a friendly against the Singapore Premier League champions, Lion City Sailors which see the match resulted in a 7–2 win for the German club.

In 2023, Both Lion City Sailors and Hougang United will host most of its 2023–24 AFC Champions League group stage matches and 2023–24 AFC Cup group stage matches at the Jalan Besar Stadium respectively as its match the requirements standard of the tournament and also being rated as a FIFA 2 Star Recommended Turf. It will also see the first time that the AFC Champions League group stage matches will be hosted in Singapore since 2010.

In March 2025, Jalan Besar Stadium also hosted Lion City Sailors 2024–25 AFC Champions League Two quarter-finals match against J1 League club Sanfrecce Hiroshima and the semi-finals match against A League club Sydney FC.

On 3 December 2025, Jalan Besar Stadium sees the pitch being restored to using natural grass for the first time since 2005 where Tampines Rovers take on BG Pathum United in the 2025–26 ASEAN Club Championship which resulted in a 3–2 win for Tampines Rovers where Hide Higashikawa scored a hat-trick.

== Facilities and structures ==
On 30 October 2012, an LED scoreboard was implemented at the Gallery stand to provide better quality video to the spectators, allowing replay video highlights of the action on the field during matchdays. Two new screens were also placed at the two ends of the Grandstand, North and South, to enable better match experience for the Gallery fans.

=== Pitch ===
From 2005 until 2025, the Jalan Besar Stadium had used artificial turf for its pitch. That year, the stadium's pitch was laid with a "FIFA 1 Star Recommended Turf", an artificial turf. The cost of relaying the pitch had cost approximately $1 million. In 2008, the stadium's pitch was relaid again at the cost of an additional $500,000, with a "FIFA 2 Star Recommended Turf", an improved quality artificial turf. The cost of re-turfing was sponsored by FIFA in collaboration with the Football Association of Singapore (FAS).

As part of the LionsXII's sponsorship by Kingsmen, a local fans club, the King George's Stand was built in 2012 using a removable stand, increasing the stadium's capacity to 8,000. The final extension for the use of the temporary seating structures expired on 29 August 2015, and the dismantling and reinstatement works would commence in November.

In 2014, the pitch was relaid to ensure maintenance of the turf. In 2021, the pitch was relaid with a GreenFields Evolution Pro 40 pitch, which is softer than the previous turfs. It consists of a durable shock pad underneath the playing surface, enhancing the compactness and reduce the hardness of the pitch.

In June 2025, the pitch was restored to natural grass to comply with the new requirements of the Asian Football Confederation (AFC), which no longer allowed fully artificial playing surfaces in major national team or club competitions. The restoration was completed in December 2025.

=== Video assistant referee technology ===
In 2022, FAS announced plans to implement video assistant referee (VAR) technology for the Singapore Premier League (SPL). The VAR system it to be operated centrally by a three-man team at the FAS headquarters in Jalan Besar Stadium. It has been in use since the 2023 Singapore Premier League season.

== Notable football events ==
- Lion City Cup
- 2009, 2010, 2023–24 AFC Champions League group stage match.
- Singapore Selection XI 0–1 Burnley (24 July 2010)
- 2012, 2013, 2014, 2015 Malaysia Super League home ground of LionsXII.
- Singapore Selection XI 0–2 Atletico Madrid (22 May 2013)
- Woodlands Wellington 0–7 Fulham U21 (4 October 2013)
- Lion City Sailors 2–7 Borussia Dortmund (24 November 2022)
- 2012, 2022, 2024, 2026 ASEAN Championship

== Transport ==
=== Mass Rapid Transit ===
Jalan Besar Stadium is located near to Lavender MRT station on the East–West Line (EWL) and Bendemeer MRT station on the Downtown Line (DTL). Despite its name, the stadium's location is closer to the latter station on the DTL rather than Jalan Besar MRT station.

== International fixtures ==
Date	Competition	Team	Score	Team
7 June 2011	Friendly	Singapore	4–0	Maldives
18 July 2011	Friendly	Singapore	3–2	Chinese Taipei
23 July 2011	2014 FIFA World Cup qualification	Singapore	5–3	Malaysia
6 September 2011	2014 FIFA World Cup qualification	Singapore	0–2	Iraq
7 October 2011	Friendly	Singapore	2–0	Philippines
11 October 2011	2014 FIFA World Cup qualification	Singapore	0–3	Jordan
15 November 2011	2014 FIFA World Cup qualification	Singapore	0–4	China
8 June 2012	Friendly	Singapore	2–2	Malaysia
14 August 2013	2015 AFC Asian Cup qualification	Singapore	0–2	Oman
10 October 2013	Friendly	Singapore	1–0	Laos
15 October 2013	2015 AFC Asian Cup qualification	Singapore	2–1	Syria
4 February 2014	2015 AFC Asian Cup qualification	Singapore	1–3	Jordan
31 March 2015	Friendly	Singapore	2–2	Guam
24 March 2016	Friendly	Singapore	2–1	Myanmar
31 August 2017	Friendly	Singapore	1–1	Hong Kong
10 September 2019	2022 FIFA World Cup qualification	Singapore	2–1	Palestine
17 December 2022	Friendly	Singapore	3–1	Maldives
31 May 2026	Friendly	Singapore	4–0	Mongolia
5 June 2026	Friendly	Singapore	1–2	China

=== AFF/ASEAN Championship ===
Date	Competition	Team	Score	Team
15 January 2005	2004 AFF Championship (Third place play-off)	Malaysia	2–1	Myanmar
12 December 2012	2012 ASEAN Championship semi-finals (Second leg)	Singapore	1–0	Philippines
19 December 2012	2012 AFF Championship Final (First leg)	Singapore	3–1	Thailand
24 December 2022	2022 AFF Championship	Singapore	3–2	Myanmar
30 December 2022	2022 AFF Championship	Singapore	0–0	Vietnam
26 December 2024	2024 ASEAN Championship semi-finals (First leg)	Singapore	0–2	Vietnam
27 July 2026	2026 ASEAN Championship	Singapore	2–0	Timor-Leste
7 August 2026	2026 ASEAN Championship	Singapore	1–1	Indonesia
15 August 2026	2026 ASEAN Championship semi-finals (First leg)	Singapore	1–3	Thailand

== See also ==
- 2006 AFC U-17 Championship
- List of stadiums in Singapore
- Peter Lim Charity Cup
