= 2013 Geylang International FC season =

Geylang International FC
2013 season
- Chairman: (Singapore) Leong Kok Fann
- Coach: (Singapore) Kanan Vedhamuthu
- Ground: Bedok Stadium
- S.League: 9th
- Singapore Cup: Quarter-Finals
- League Cup: Quarter-Finals
- Top goalscorer: League: Jozef Kaplan (14); All: Jozef Kaplan (20)
Home colours	Away colours

The 2013 S.League season was Geylang International's 18th season in the top flight of Singapore football and 38th year in existence as a football club.

== Squad ==
No.	Name	Nationality	Position (s)	Date of birth (age)
Goalkeepers
1	Takuma Ito	(Japan)	GK	11 August 1986 (age 39)
19	Joey Sim	(Singapore)	GK	2 March 1987 (age 39)
Defenders
2	Khairulnizam Jumahat	(Singapore)	DF	8 December 1989 (age 36)
3	Khairulhayat Jumat	(Singapore)	DF	29 August 1987 (age 38)
4	Delwinder Singh	(Singapore)	DF	5 August 1992 (age 33)
5	Duncan Elias	(Singapore)	DF	14 July 1985 (age 40)
7	Norihiro Kawakami	(Japan)	DF	4 April 1987 (age 38)
Midfielders
8	Jalal Jasim	(Singapore)	MF	28 December 1980 (age 45)
10	Yasir Hanapi	(Singapore)	MF	21 June 1989 (age 36)
11	Stefan Milojevic	(France)	MF	6 February 1989 (age 37)
12	Fabian Kwok	(Singapore)	MF	17 March 1989 (age 37)
15	Shah Hirul	(Singapore)	MF	7 May 1986 (age 39)
20	Mohd Noor Ali	(Singapore)	MF	16 May 1975 (age 50)
Forwards
9	Shotaro Ihata	(Japan)	FW	12 February 1987 (age 39)
13	Andrew Tan	(Singapore)	FW	18 May 1987 (age 38)
14	Wahyudi Wahid	(Singapore)	FW	29 October 1989 (age 36)
17	Jozef Kaplan	(Slovakia)	FW	2 April 1986 (age 39)

== Coaching staff ==
Position	Name
Head coach	(Singapore) Kanan Vedhamuthu
Assistant coach	(Singapore) Mohd Noor Ali
Goalkeeping coach	(Singapore) Kumar Krishnan
Team manager	(Singapore) Andrew Ang
Physiotherapist	(Singapore) Rebecca Marie
Kitman	(Singapore) Abdul Halim Yusop

== Pre-Season Transfers ==
=== In ===
Position	Player	Transferred From
GK	(Japan) Takuma Ito	(Japan) Albirex Niigata Singapore
DF	(Singapore) Khairulnizam Jumahat	(Singapore) Geylang International U23
DF	(Singapore) Delwinder Singh	(Singapore) Tanjong Pagar United
DF	(Singapore) Duncan Elias	(Singapore) Woodlands Wellington
DF	(Japan) Norihiro Kawakami	(Japan) Albirex Niigata Singapore
FW	(Japan) Shotaro Ihata	(Singapore) Home United
MF	(Singapore) Yasir Hanapi	(Singapore) LionsXII
MF	(Singapore) Fabian Kwok	(Singapore) Geylang International U23
FW	(Singapore) Amy Recha	(Singapore) Geylang International U23
DF	(Singapore) Norhazwan Norasikin	(Singapore) Geylang International U23
GK	(Singapore) Joey Sim	(Singapore) Balestier Khalsa
MF	(Singapore) Taufiq Ghani	(Singapore) Geylang International U23

=== Out ===
Position	Player	Transferred To
GK	(Japan) Ridhuan Bahaudin	(Singapore) Tampines Rovers
MF	(Singapore) Zul Elhan Fahmi	Released
FW	(Singapore) Ishak Zainol	Released
MF	(Singapore) Shahril Alias	(Singapore) Woodlands Wellington
FW	(Japan) Rizawan Abdullah	(Singapore) Tanjong Pagar United
FW	(Singapore) Faizal Samad	Released
MF	(England) Michael King	Released
MF	(Singapore) Syed Fadhil	(Singapore) Warriors FC
MF	(Singapore) Mathew Sinivasan	(Singapore) Admiralty FC
FW	(Korea) Mun Seung Man	Released
MF	(Singapore) Mubarak Ahamad	Released
MF	(Singapore) Ang Zhi Wei	(Singapore) Woodlands Wellington
GK	(Singapore) Yazid Yasin	(Singapore) Woodlands Wellington

== Mid-Season Transfers ==
=== In ===
Position	Player	Transferred From
MF	(Singapore) Andrew Tan	(Singapore) Balestier Khalsa
MF	(Singapore) Mohd Noor Ali	Free Transfer

=== Out ===
Position	Player	Transferred To
FW	(Singapore) Amy Recha	Served National Service

== Pre-season Friendlies ==
3 February 2013 Friendly	(Malaysia) Johor Darul Takzim	1–0	(Singapore) Geylang International	Larkin Stadium
20:45 (UTC+8)

5 February 2013 Friendly	(Malaysia) ATM FA	2–1	(Singapore) Geylang International	Selayang Stadium
20:45 (UTC+8)

7 February 2013 Friendly	(Malaysia) Selangor FA	0–0	(Singapore) Geylang International	MPSJ Stadium
17:15 (UTC+8)

== Club Friendlies ==
8 April 2013 Friendly	(Singapore) Geylang International	1–1	(Singapore) LionsXII	Bedok Stadium
19:30 (UTC+8)

14 August 2013 Friendly	(Singapore) LionsXII	1–2	(Singapore) Geylang International	Jurong West Stadium
19:30 (UTC+8)

11 October 2013 Friendly	(Singapore) Geylang International	1–0	(Singapore) Tampines Rovers	Bedok Stadium
19:30 (UTC+8)

19 August 2013 Friendly	(Singapore) Geylang International	5–0	(Hong Kong) Sun Source	Bedok Stadium
17:00 (UTC+8)

3 November 2013 Friendly	(Singapore) Geylang International	3–2	Foreign Trialist Team	Bedok Stadium
19:30 (UTC+8)

== S.League ==
=== Round 1 ===
7 February 2013 1	(Singapore) Geylang International	0–5	(Singapore) Tampines Rovers	Bedok Stadium
19:30 (UTC+8)	Fabian Kwok (yellow card) 43'	Report	Sead Hadžibulić 9'; Shaiful Esah 22'; Firdaus Kasman 44' (yellow card) 67'; Jamil Ali 62'; Seiji Kaneko (yellow card) 70'; Kunihiro Yamashita (yellow card) 73'; Khairul Amri 82'	Referee: W Ravisanthiran

26 February 2013 2	(Singapore) Balestier Khalsa	1–0	(Singapore) Geylang International	Toa Payoh
19:30 (UTC+8)	Ruhaizad Ismail 21'; Zulkiffli Hassim (red card) 71'; Jung-Hee Bong (yellow card) 76'	Report	Yasir Hanapi (yellow card) 56'; Jalal Jasim (red card) 71'; Fabian Kwok (yellow card) 90'	Stadium: (Singapore) Toa Payoh Stadium; Referee: Abdul Malik

10 March 2013 3	(Malaysia) Harimau Muda B	1–4	(Singapore) Geylang International	Johor Bahru
16:45 (UTC+8)	Faizat Ghazli (yellow card) 39' (goal) 90'; Wan Nadris (yellow card) 42'; Ridzuan Abdunloh (yellow card) 72'; Asri Mardzuki (yellow card) 82'	Report	Yasir Hanapi (yellow card) 30'; Jozef Kaplan 42' (pen) 49' 84'; Norhazwan Norasikin 59' (yellow card) 59'; Fabian Kwok (yellow card) 69'; Delwinder Singh (yellow card) 83'; Taufiq Ghani (red card) 90'	Stadium: Pasir Gudang Stadium; Referee: Ahmad A'Qashah

16 March 2013 4	(Singapore) Geylang International	0–3	(Singapore) Warriors FC	Bedok
19:30 (UTC+8)	Delwinder Singh (yellow card) 58'; Khayrulhayat Jumat (yellow card) 81'	Report	M. Karoglan 51'; Shimpei Sakurada 61'; Tatsuro Inui 79'; Abdil Qaiyyim (yellow card) 85'	Stadium: (Singapore) Bedok Stadium; Referee: W Ravisanthiran

23 March 2013 5	(Singapore) Geylang International	1–3	(Singapore) Home United	Bedok
19:30 (UTC+8)	Yasir Hanapi 32' (yellow card) 71'; Fabian Kwok (yellow card) 61'; Norhazwan Norasikin (yellow card) 68'	Report	Nor Azli Yusoff (yellow card) 45'; Lee Kwan Woo 51'; Masrezwan Masturi (yellow card) 58'; Song-Ui Young 65'; Jordan Webb 75'; Mustaqim Manzur (yellow card) 90'	Stadium: Bedok Stadium; Referee: Farhad Mohd

27 March 2013 6	(Singapore) Geylang International	2–0	(Singapore) Hougang United	Bedok Stadium
19:30 (UTC+8)	Khayrulhayat Jumat (yellow card) 54'; Taufiq Ghani (yellow card) 57'; Jozef Kaplan 65'; Khairulnizam Jumahat 89'	Report	Hasree Zais (yellow card) 14'	Referee: Irwan Samsuddin

3 April 2013 7	Brunei DPMM	4–2	(Singapore) Geylang International	Sultan Hassanal Bolkiah Stadium
19:30 (UTC+8)	João Moreira (yellow card) 15' (goal) 51' 79'; Helmi Zamrin (yellow card) 39' (goal) 48'; Sairol Sahari (yellow card) 64'; Fakharazzi Hassan 77'; Stéphane Auvray (yellow card) 90'	Report	Delwinder Singh (yellow card) 22'; Yasir Hanapi 87'; Jozef Kaplan (yellow card) 80' (goal) 90+2' (pen)	Referee: Farhad Mohd

12 April 2013 8	(Singapore) Geylang International	2–2	(Japan) Albirex Niigata (S)	Jalan Besar Stadium
19:30 (UTC+8)	Fabian Kwok (yellow card) 46'; Norihiro Kawakami (yellow card) 59' (goal) 87' 90'	Report	Kazuki Sakamoto 16'; Khayrulhayat Jumat 90+2' (o.g.)	Referee: Abdul Malik

18 April 2013 9	(Singapore) Woodlands Wellington	0–0	(Singapore) Geylang International	Woodlands Stadium
19:30 (UTC+8)	Shahril Alias (yellow card) 26'; Ang Zhi Wei (yellow card) 58'	Report	Taufiq Ghani (yellow card) 15'; Fabian Kwok (yellow card) 39'	Referee: Leow Thiam Hoe

23 April 2013 10	(Singapore) Geylang International	2–1	(Singapore) Tanjong Pagar United	Bedok Stadium
19:30 (UTC+8)	Jozef Kaplan 26'; Yasir Hanapi 45'; Khayrulhayat Jumat (yellow card) 78'	Report	Kamel Ramdani 3'; Sazali Salleh (yellow card) 31'; Walid Lounis (yellow card) 74'	Referee: Muhd Taqi

3 May 2013 11	(Singapore) Courts Young Lions	0–1	(Singapore) Geylang International	Jalan Besar Stadium
19:30 (UTC+8)	Sharif El-Masri (yellow card) 42'; Farhan Rahmat (yellow card) 52'; Sahil Suhaimi (yellow card) 60'; Shamil Sharif (yellow card) 68'	Report	Wahyudi Wahid (yellow card) 64' (goal) 71'; Basil Teo (yellow card) 85'	Referee: Leow Thiam Hoe

=== Round 2 ===
16 March 2014 12	(Singapore) Tampines Rovers	1–0	(Singapore) Geylang International	Clementi Stadium
17:30 (UTC+8)	Martin Wagner (yellow card) 34'; Jamil Ali 62'; Imran Sahib (yellow card) 74'		Yasir Hanapi (yellow card) 73'; Khayrulhayat Jumat (yellow card) 83'	Referee: Muhd Taqi

16 May 2013 13	(Singapore) Geylang International	2–2	(Singapore) Balestier Khalsa	Bedok Stadium
19:30 (UTC+8)	Wahyudi Wahid 57'; Norihiro Kawakami (yellow card) 69'; Jozef Kaplan 86'		Paul Cunningham 18'; Kim Minho 37'; Poh Yi Feng (yellow card) 52'; Imran Sahib (yellow card) 76' (yellow-red card); Hamqaamal Shah (yellow card) 87'	Referee: Yazeen Buhari

26 June 2013 14	(Singapore) Geylang International	2–0	(Malaysia) Harimau Muda B	Bedok
19:30 (UTC+8)	Yasir Hanapi (yellow card) 35'; Khayrulhayat Jumat (yellow card) 49'; Jozef Kaplan 70'; Fabian Kwok 93'		Nur Areff (yellow card) 44'; Faizat Ghazli (yellow card) 78'; Akhir Bahari (yellow card) 83'	Stadium: Bedok Stadium; Referee: Leow Thiam Hoe

4 July 2013 15	(Singapore) Home United	2–1	(Singapore) Geylang International	Bishan Stadium
19:30 (UTC+8)	Sirina Camara (yellow card) 32'; Ismail Yunos (yellow card) 61'; Jordan Webb (yellow card) 71'; Lee Kwan Woo 76'; Dakyung Kwon 80'		Khayrulhayat Jumat (yellow card) 33'; Jozef Kaplan 35' (yellow card) 81'; Takuma Ito (yellow card) 54'	Referee: Jansen Foo

10 July 2013 16	(Singapore) Hougang United	0–1	(Singapore) Geylang International	Hougang Stadium
20:00 (UTC+8)	Faizal Amir (yellow card) 31'; Mamadou Diallo (yellow card) 84'; Thomas Beattie (yellow card) 92'; Jerome Baker (yellow card) 92'; Syaqir Sulaiman (yellow card) 96'		Khayrulhayat Jumat (yellow card) 19'; Yasir Hanapi 57' (yellow card) 73'; Jozef Kaplan (red card)	Referee: Farhad Mohd

19 July 2013 17	(Singapore) Geylang International	0–1	Brunei DPMM	Jalan Besar Stadium
20:00 (UTC+8)	Basil Teo (yellow card) 59'; Stefan Milojevic (yellow card) 65'		Rosmin Kamis 82'	Referee: W Ravisanthiran

3 August 2013 18	(Japan) Albirex Niigata (S)	0–0	(Singapore) Geylang International	Jurong East
20:00 (UTC+8)			Mohd Noor Ali (yellow card) 55'; Basil Teo (yellow card) 57'; Shotaro Ihata (yellow card) 74'; Norihiro Kawakami (yellow card) 85'	Stadium: Jurong East Stadium; Referee: Irwan Samsuddin

6 August 2013 19	(Singapore) Warriors FC	0–0	(Singapore) Geylang International	Choa Chu Kang Stadium
20:00 (UTC+8)

23 August 2013 20	(Singapore) Geylang International	1–2	(Singapore) Woodlands Wellington	Kallang
19:30 (UTC+8)				Stadium: (Singapore) Jalan Besar Stadium

28 August 2013 21	(Singapore) Tanjong Pagar United	1–1	(Singapore) Geylang International	Queenstown
20:00 (UTC+8)				Stadium: (Singapore) Queenstown Stadium

18 September 2013 22	(Singapore) Geylang International	0–1	(Singapore) Courts Young Lions	Bedok
19:30 (UTC+8)				Stadium: (Singapore) Bedok Stadium

=== Round 2.5 ===
22 September 2013 23	(Malaysia) Harimau Muda B	2–2	(Singapore) Geylang International	Johor Bahru
20:45 (UTC+8)	M. Mohamad Ghazli 37'; M. Mohd Noor 81'; Syafiq Shalihin (yellow card) 901'		Jozef Kaplan 42'; Taufiq Ghani 60' (yellow card) 61'; Delwinder Singh (yellow card) 37'; Jalal Jasim (yellow card) 85'	Stadium: (Malaysia) Pasir Gudang Stadium, Referee: W. Ravisanthiran

18 October 2013 24	(Singapore) Geylang International	3–0	(Malaysia) Warriors FC	Bedok
19:30 (UTC+8)	Stefan Milojevic 57' (yellow card) 83'; Jozef Kaplan 65' 70'		Sufian Anuar (yellow card) 74'; Daniel Bennett (yellow card) 83'	Stadium: Bedok Stadium; Referee: Mohd Farhad

24 October 2013 25	(Singapore) Geylang International	1–0	(Singapore) Courts Young Lions	Bedok
19:30 (UTC+8)	Jalal Jasim 21'; Yasir Hanapi (yellow card) 30'			Stadium: (Singapore) Bedok Stadium; Referee: Jansen Foo

10 July 2013 26	(Singapore) Hougang United	4–1	(Singapore) Geylang International	Hougang
19:30 (UTC+8)	Jerome Baker 13'; Fazli Jaffar 47'; A. Sairudin 59'; Mamadou Diallo 62'; Igor Cerina (yellow card) 37'		Norihiro Kawakami 52'; Wahyudi Wahid (yellow card) 37'	Stadium: (Singapore) Hougang Stadium; Referee: W. Ravisanthiran

6 October 2013 27	Brunei DPMM	2–2	(Singapore) Geylang International	Bandar Seri Begawan
20:15 (UTC+8)	Rodrigo 18'; Shahrazen Said 46'		Jozef Kaplan 66'; Tales Dos Santos 90' (o.g.); Taufiq Ghani (yellow card) 34'	Stadium: (Brunei) Hassanal Bolkiah Stadium

== Singapore League Cup ==
8 June 2013 First Round	(Japan) Albirex Niigata (S)	0–0	(Singapore) Geylang International	Jurong East
19:30 (UTC+8)		Report		Stadium: (Singapore) Jurong East Stadium; Referee: W Ravisanthiran

11 June 2013 First round	(Singapore) Geylang International	2–1	(Singapore) Hougang United	Bedok
19:30 (UTC+8)	Jozef Kaplán 43', 77' (pen.)	Report	Jerome Baker 59'	Stadium: (Singapore) Bedok Stadium; Referee: Sukhbir Singh

16 June 2013 Quarter Finals	(Singapore) Geylang International	0–0 (a.e.t.) (1–4 p)	(Singapore) Woodlands Wellington	Bedok
19:30 (UTC+8)		Report		Stadium: (Singapore) Bedok Stadium; Referee: Yazeen Buhari
	Penalties
	Norihiro Kawakami (penalty missed); Jozef Kaplán (penalty missed); Shotaro Ihata (penalty scored)		(penalty scored) Moon Soon-ho; (penalty scored) Rosman Sulaiman; (penalty scored) Cho Sung-hwan; (penalty scored) Goh Swee Swee

== Singapore Cup ==
29 May 2013 Preliminary Round	(Singapore) Woodlands Wellington	1–4	(Singapore) Geylang International	Woodlands
19:30 (UTC+8)	Moon Soon-Ho 6'	Report	Jozef Kapláň 46', 49', 60'; Yasir Hanapi 66' (pen)	Stadium: Woodlands Stadium

23 July 2013 Quarter-finals (1st leg)	(Singapore) Geylang International	0–2	(Singapore) Home United	Bedok
20:00 (UTC+8)	Yasir Hanapi (yellow card) 82' (red card)	Report	Hafiz Rahim 45'; Firdaus Idros 59'	Stadium: Bedok Stadium

29 July 2013 Quarter-finals (2nd leg)	(Singapore) Home United	3–2	(Singapore) Geylang International	Bishan
20:00 (UTC+8)	Ismail Yunos 14'; Firdaus Idros 36'; Indra Sahdan 49'	Report	Stefan Milojević 35'; Jozef Kapláň 71'	Stadium: Bishan Stadium

== Squad stats ==
=== Goals & Appearances ===
Updated Dec 23, 2013

No.	Pos	Nat	Player	Total		S.League		League Cup		Singapore Cup	
No.	Pos	Nat	Player	Apps	Goals	Apps	Goals	Apps	Goals	Apps	Goals
1	GK	(Japan) JPN	Takuma Ito	29	0	23	0	3	0	3	0
2	DF	(Singapore) SGP	Khairulnizam Jumahat	21	1	15	1	3	0	3	0
3	DF	(Singapore) SGP	Khayrulhayat Jumat	21	0	16	0	3	0	2	0
4	DF	(Singapore) SGP	Delwinder Singh	21	0	20	0	0	0	1	0
5	DF	(Singapore) SGP	Duncan Elias	18	0	16	0	1	0	1	0
7	DF	(Japan) JPN	Norihiro Kawakami	33	3	27	3	3	0	3	0
8	MF	(Singapore) SGP	Jalal	30	1	24	1	3	0	3	0
9	FW	(Japan) JPN	Shotaro Ihata	19	1	17	1	2	0	0	0
10	MF	(Singapore) SGP	Yasir Hanapi	28	4	24	4	2	0	2	0
11	MF	(France) FRA	Stefan Milojevic	14	2	12	1	0	0	2	1
12	MF	(Singapore) SGP	Fabian Kwok	17	1	14	1	2	0	1	0
13	MF	(Singapore) SGP	Andrew Tan	28	0	22	0	3	0	3	0
14	MF	(Singapore) SGP	Wahyudi Wahid	20	2	14	2	3	0	3	0
15	MF	(Singapore) SGP	Shah Hirul	2	0	1	0	1	0	0	0
16	MF	(Singapore) SGP	Mohd Noor Ali	8	0	8	0	0	0	0	0
17	MF	(Slovakia) SVK	Jozef Kaplan	31	20	25	14	3	2	3	4
18	MF	(Singapore) SGP	Norhazwan Norashikin	19	1	15	1	3	0	1	0
19	GK	(Singapore) SGP	Joey Sim	4	0	4	0	0	0	0	0
20	MF	(Singapore) SGP	Taufiq Ghani	29	1	23	1	3	0	3	0
-	FW	(Singapore) SGP	Amy Recha	3	0	3	0	0	0	0	0

=== Disciplinary ===
No.	Pos.	Name	S.League		League Cup		Singapore Cup		Total	
No.	Pos.	Name	Booked	Sent off (straight red)	Booked	Sent off (straight red)	Booked	Sent off (straight red)	Booked	Sent off (straight red)
1	GK	(Japan) Takuma Ito	2	0	0	0	0	0	2	0
2	DF	(Singapore) Khairulnizam Jumahat	3	0	0	0	1	0	4	0
3	DF	(Singapore) Khayrulhayat Jumat	8	0	0	0	1	0	9	0
4	DF	(Singapore) Delwinder Singh	4	0	0	0	0	0	4	0
5	DF	(Japan) Duncan Elias	2	0	0	0	0	0	2	0
7	DF	(Japan) Norihiro Kawakami	3	0	1	0	0	0	4	0
8	MF	(Singapore) Jalal	1	1	0	0	0	0	1	1
9	FW	(Japan) Shotaro Ihata	1	0	0	0	0	0	1	0
10	MF	(Singapore) Yasir Hanapi	8	0	2	0	0	1	10	1
11	MF	(France) Stefan Milojevic	3	0	0	0	1	0	4	0
12	MF	(Singapore) Fabian Kwok	6	0	2	0	0	0	8	0
13	MF	(Singapore) Andrew Tan	0	0	0	0	0	0	0	0
14	MF	(Singapore) Wahyudi Wahid	4	0	0	0	1	0	5	0
15	MF	(Singapore) Shah Hirul	0	0	0	0	0	0	0	0
16	MF	(Singapore) Noor Ali	2	1	0	0	0	0	2	1
17	FW	(Slovakia) Jozef Kaplan	2	1	1	0	0	0	3	1
18	MF	(Singapore) Norhazwan Norashikin	2	0	0	0	0	0	2	0
19	GK	(Singapore) Joey Sim	0	0	0	0	0	0	0	0
20	MF	(Singapore) Taufiq Ghani	5	1	0	0	2	0	7	1
*	FW	(Singapore) Amy Recha	0	0	0	0	0	0	0	0
Total			56	4	6	0	6	1	68	5
