= List of Singapore football transfers in 2013 =

This is a list of transfers in the 2013 season of Singapore football.

== Albirex Niigata (S) ==
=== In (Pre-Season) ===
Note: Flags indicate national team as defined under FIFA eligibility rules; some limited exceptions apply. Players may hold more than one non-FIFA nationality.

No.	Pos.	Nation	Player
—	GK	JPN	Kenjiro Ogino (from Cerezo Osaka)
—	MF	JPN	Shingo Suzuki (Free Agent)
—	DF	JPN	Takaaki Usami (from Japan Soccer College)
—	DF	JPN	Yuya Nagae (from Japan Soccer College)
—	DF	JPN	Yu Takano (from Japan Soccer College)
—	MF	JPN	Gentaro Murakami (from Japan Soccer College)
—	MF	JPN	Kento Nagasaki (from Shizuoka Sangyo University)
—	MF	JPN	Hiroki Morisaki (from Japan Soccer College)
—	FW	JPN	Kazuki Hiroshi (from Japan Soccer College)
—	FW	JPN	Bruno Castanheira (from Albirex Niigata)

No.	Pos.	Nation	Player
—	DF	JPN	Kento Fukuda (from Shonan Bellmare)
—	DF	JPN	Masahiro Ishikawa (from Tokushima Vortis)
—	DF	JPN	Tatsuya Sase (from Japan Soccer College)
—	DF	JPN	Naotoshi Ito (from Japan Soccer College)
—	DF	JPN	Itsuki Yamada (from Ritsumeikan University)
—	MF	JPN	Kazuya Fukuzaki (from Japan Soccer College)
—	MF	JPN	Katsumi Takahashi (from Japan Soccer College)
—	FW	JPN	Ikuma Osaka (from Japan Soccer College)
—	FW	JPN	Yoshinaga Arima (from Japan Soccer College)
—	FW	JPN	Kazuki Sakamoto (from Ritsumeikan University)

=== Out (Pre-Season) ===
Note: Flags indicate national team as defined under FIFA eligibility rules; some limited exceptions apply. Players may hold more than one non-FIFA nationality.

No.	Pos.	Nation	Player
—	FW	JPN	Sho Kamimura (to Shillong Lajong FC)
—	GK	JPN	Takuma Ito (to Geylang International)
—	MF	JPN	Atsushi Shimono (to Woodlands Wellington)
—	MF	JPN	Keisuke Matsui (Released)
—	FW	JPN	Yasuhiro Yamakoshi (Released)
—	DF	JPN	Takeshi Ito (Released)
—	FW	JPN	Yutaka Nishi (Released)
—	FW	JPN	Toshikazu Soya (Released)
—	MF	JPN	Yuhei Shiratori (Released)
—	DF	JPN	Hidekazu Yamamoto (Released)

No.	Pos.	Nation	Player
—	DF	JPN	Norihiro Kawakami (to Geylang International)
—	DF	JPN	Kunihiro Yamashita (to Tampines Rovers)
—	MF	JPN	Musashi Okuyama (to Albirex Niigata)
—	DF	JPN	Masahiko Ando (Released)
—	GK	JPN	Junki Kato (Released)
—	MF	JPN	Keita Kobayashi (Released)
—	DF	JPN	Kota Tamakawa (Released)
—	DF	JPN	Daiki Shoji (Released)
—	DF	JPN	Yuta Oguriyama (Released)
—	GK	JPN	Tengo Miura (Released)

== Balestier Khalsa ==
=== In (Pre-Season) ===
Note: Flags indicate national team as defined under FIFA eligibility rules; some limited exceptions apply. Players may hold more than one non-FIFA nationality.

No.	Pos.	Nation	Player
—	FW	SGP	Qiu Li (from Home United)
—	FW	KOR	Jung Hee-Bong (from Gombak United)

No.	Pos.	Nation	Player
—	DF	NGR	Obadin Aikhena (from Gombak United)
—	GK	SGP	Zaiful Nizam (from Gombak United)

=== Out (Pre-Season) ===
Note: Flags indicate national team as defined under FIFA eligibility rules; some limited exceptions apply. Players may hold more than one non-FIFA nationality.

No.	Pos.	Nation	Player
—	FW	SGP	Andrew Tan (to Geylang International)
—	MF	SGP	Anantha Rajan (Released)
—	FW	MNE	Zdravko Dragićević ([Released)

No.	Pos.	Nation	Player
—	GK	SGP	Joey Sim (Geylang International)
—	DF	AUS	Goran Subara (to Bangkok Glass)

== Brunei DPMM ==
=== In (Pre-Season) ===
Note: Flags indicate national team as defined under FIFA eligibility rules; some limited exceptions apply. Players may hold more than one non-FIFA nationality.

No.	Pos.	Nation	Player
—	DF	CRO	Dino Drpic (from HNK Rijeka)
—	FW	POR	João Moreira (from Almansa)

No.	Pos.	Nation	Player
—	FW	CRO	Ivan Bošnjak (from Rijeka)
—	MF	GLP	Stéphane Auvray (from New York Red Bulls)

=== Out (Pre-Season) ===
Note: Flags indicate national team as defined under FIFA eligibility rules; some limited exceptions apply. Players may hold more than one non-FIFA nationality.

No.	Pos.	Nation	Player
—	MF	CRO	Ivan Jerković (Released)
—	FW	BRA	Patrick da Silva (Released)

No.	Pos.	Nation	Player
—	FW	GHA	Osman Bashiru (Released)

=== Out (Mid-Season) ===
Note: Flags indicate national team as defined under FIFA eligibility rules; some limited exceptions apply. Players may hold more than one non-FIFA nationality.

No.	Pos.	Nation	Player
—	FW	CRO	Ivan Bošnjak (Released)
—	DF	CRO	Dino Drpic (Released)

No.	Pos.	Nation	Player
—	MF	GLP	Stephane Auvray (Released)

== Courts Young Lions ==
=== In (Pre-Season) ===
Note: Flags indicate national team as defined under FIFA eligibility rules; some limited exceptions apply. Players may hold more than one non-FIFA nationality.

No.	Pos.	Nation	Player
—	DF	SGP	Eddie Chang (from Warriors F.C.)
—	GK	SGP	Rudy Khairullah (from Gombak United)
—	MF	SGP	Stanley Ng (from Geylang International)
—	MF	SGP	Nur Ridho (from NFA Reds)
—	MF	SGP	Anumanthan Mohan Kumar (from NFA Reds)
—	MF	SGP	Afiq Mat Noor (from Free Agent)
—	MF	SGP	Faiz Salleh (from Free Agent)
—	MF	SGP	Nur Naiim Ishak (from Free Agent)
—	FW	SGP	Samuel Benjamin (from Gombak United)

No.	Pos.	Nation	Player
—	GK	SGP	Zulfairuuz Rudy (from NFA Reds)
—	DF	SGP	Syafiq Iderus (from NFA Reds)
—	DF	SGP	Tajeli Salamat (from NFA Reds)
—	DF	SGP	Nurullah Hussein (from Gombak United)
—	MF	SGP	Fareez Farhan (from Gombak United)
—	FW	SGP	Sahil Suhaimi (from Free Agent)
—	FW	SGP	Nicholas Marc Cher (from Warriors F.C.)
—	FW	SGP	Farhan Rahmat (from Hougang United)
—	FW	SGP	Ignatius Ang (from Hougang United)

=== Out (Pre-Season) ===
Note: Flags indicate national team as defined under FIFA eligibility rules; some limited exceptions apply. Players may hold more than one non-FIFA nationality.

No.	Pos.	Nation	Player
—	FW	FRA	Jonathan Toto (Doxa Drama F.C.)
—	FW	SGP	Shafiq Ghani (LionsXII)
—	GK	SGP	Neezam Abdul Aziz (LionsXII)
—	MF	SGP	Aqhari Abdullah (LionsXII)
—	MF	SGP	Nazrul Nazari (LionsXII)
—	FW	SGP	Syafiq Zainal (LionsXII)
—	MF	SGP	Haniff Sadique (Balestier Khalsa)

No.	Pos.	Nation	Player
—	FW	DEN	Benjamin Kristoffersen Lee (Released)
—	DF	SGP	Faritz Hameed (LionsXII)
—	MF	SGP	Faris Ramli (LionsXII)
—	MF	SGP	Hafiz Abu Sujad (LionsXII)
—	MF	SGP	Zulfahmi Arifin (LionsXII)
—	DF	FRA	Sirina Camara (Home United)

=== In (Mid-Season) ===
Note: Flags indicate national team as defined under FIFA eligibility rules; some limited exceptions apply. Players may hold more than one non-FIFA nationality.

No.	Pos.	Nation	Player
—	FW	SGP	Iqbal Hussain (from LionsXII)
—	MF	SGP	Raihan Rahman (from LionsXII)

No.	Pos.	Nation	Player
—	DF	SGP	Faris Azienuddin (from LionsXII)

=== Out (Mid-Season) ===
Note: Flags indicate national team as defined under FIFA eligibility rules; some limited exceptions apply. Players may hold more than one non-FIFA nationality.

No. / Pos. / Nation / Player; — / MF / SGP / Fazli Ayob (to LionsXII)	No. / Pos. / Nation / Player

== Geylang International ==
=== In (Pre-Season) ===
Note: Flags indicate national team as defined under FIFA eligibility rules; some limited exceptions apply. Players may hold more than one non-FIFA nationality.

No.	Pos.	Nation	Player
—	FW	SGP	Andrew Tan (from Balestier Khalsa)
—	GK	SGP	Joey Sim (from Balestier Khalsa)
—	GK	JPN	Takuma Ito (from Albirex Niigata (S))
—	DF	JPN	Norihiro Kawakami (from Albirex Niigata (S))
—	FW	JPN	Shotaro Ihata (from Home United)

No.	Pos.	Nation	Player
—	FW	SGP	Wahyudi Wahid (from Borussia Zamrud)
—	MF	SGP	Yasir Hanapi (from LionsXII)
—	DF	SGP	Duncan Elias (from Woodlands Wellington)
—	DF	SGP	Delwinder Singh (from Tanjong Pagar United)

=== Out (Pre-Season) ===
Note: Flags indicate national team as defined under FIFA eligibility rules; some limited exceptions apply. Players may hold more than one non-FIFA nationality.

No.	Pos.	Nation	Player
—	FW	SGP	Rizawan Abdullah (to Tanjong Pagar United)
—	DF	SGP	Shahril Alias (to Woodlands Wellington)
—	MF	SGP	Ang Zhiwei (to Woodlands Wellington)
—	GK	SGP	Yazid Yasin (to Woodlands Wellington)
—	GK	SGP	Ridhuan Barudin (to Tampines Rovers)
—	DF	SGP	Syed Fadhil (to Warriors F.C.)
—	FW	KOR	Mun Seung-Man (Released)

No.	Pos.	Nation	Player
—	MF	ENG	Michael King (Released)
—	MF	SGP	Zul Elhan Fahmai (Released)
—	MF	SGP	Faizal Samad (Released)
—	DF	SGP	Salim Rahim (Released)
—	DF	SGP	Mubarak Ahmad (Released)
—	MF	SGP	Ishak Zainol (Released)
—	MF	SGP	Hassan Aziz (Released)

== Home United ==
=== In (Pre-Season) ===
Note: Flags indicate national team as defined under FIFA eligibility rules; some limited exceptions apply. Players may hold more than one non-FIFA nationality.

No.	Pos.	Nation	Player
—	FW	JPN	Masato Fukui (from Gainare Tottori)
—	GK	KOR	Jang Hong-Won (Free Agent)
—	DF	SGP	Sirina Camara (from Courts Young Lions)
—	DF	SGP	Ismail Yunos (from Gombak United)
—	MF	SGP	Mustaqim Manzur (from Gombak United)
—	MF	SGP	Hafiz Rahim (from Warriors F.C.)

No.	Pos.	Nation	Player
—	DF	SGP	Sevki Sha'ban (from LionsXII)
—	DF	SGP	Juma'at Jantan (from LionsXII)
—	FW	CAN	Jordan Webb (from Hougang United)
—	MF	KOR	Lee Kwan-Woo (from Free Agent)
—	MF	SGP	Aliff Shafaein (from Warriors F.C.)
—	MF	SGP	Noh Rahman (from Warriors F.C.)

=== Out (Pre-Season) ===
Note: Flags indicate national team as defined under FIFA eligibility rules; some limited exceptions apply. Players may hold more than one non-FIFA nationality.

No.	Pos.	Nation	Player
—	MF	SGP	John Wilkinson (to Salgaocar)
—	FW	FRA	Frédéric Mendy (to GD Estoril Praia)
—	DF	CAF	Franklin Anzité (Released)
—	DF	SGP	Rosman Sulaiman (to Woodlands Wellington)
—	GK	SGP	Lionel Lewis (Retirement)
—	DF	JPN	Kenji Arai (Released)
—	FW	JPN	Shotaro Ihata (to Geylang International)

No.	Pos.	Nation	Player
—	DF	SGP	Jeremy Chiang (to Hougang United)
—	MF	SGP	Shi Jiayi (to Warriors F.C.)
—	FW	SGP	Qiu Li (to Balestier Khalsa)
—	GK	SGP	Nazri Sabri (Released)
—	DF	SGP	Kairuldin Ishak (Released)
—	MF	SGP	Rhysh Roshan Rai (Released)

== Hougang United ==
=== In (Pre-Season) ===
Note: Flags indicate national team as defined under FIFA eligibility rules; some limited exceptions apply. Players may hold more than one non-FIFA nationality.

No.	Pos.	Nation	Player
—	DF	SGP	Shahir Hamzah (from LionsXII)
—	FW	NGR	Robert Eziakor (from Tiong Bahru FC)
—	DF	SGP	Jeremy Chiang (from Home United)
—	FW	SGP	Fairoz Hasan (from Gombak United)

No.	Pos.	Nation	Player
—	MF	ENG	Thomas Beattie (Free Agent)
—	FW	ENG	Liam Shotton (from Kidsgrove Athletic)
—	MF	ENG	Jerome Baker (from FC Edmonton)

=== Out (Pre-Season) ===
Note: Flags indicate national team as defined under FIFA eligibility rules; some limited exceptions apply. Players may hold more than one non-FIFA nationality.

No.	Pos.	Nation	Player
—	MF	CRO	Ante Barać (to NK Konavljanin)
—	MF	SGP	Ridhwan Osman (to Woodlands Wellington)

No.	Pos.	Nation	Player
—	DF	CRO	Stanislav Vidaković (Released)
—	FW	CAN	Jordan Webb (to Home United)

== Tampines Rovers ==
=== In (Pre-Season) ===
Note: Flags indicate national team as defined under FIFA eligibility rules; some limited exceptions apply. Players may hold more than one non-FIFA nationality.

No.	Pos.	Nation	Player
—	FW	SGP	Khairul Amri (from LionsXII)
—	MF	SGP	Shahdan Sulaiman (from LionsXII)
—	MF	SGP	Firdaus Kasman (from LionsXII)
—	DF	SGP	Shaiful Esah (from LionsXII)

No.	Pos.	Nation	Player
—	MF	ARG	Martín Wagner (from Defensa y Justicia)
—	DF	JPN	Seiji Kaneko (from Mitra Kukar)
—	DF	JPN	Kunihiro Yamashita (from Albirex Niigata (S))
—	GK	SGP	Ridhuan Barudin (from LionsXII)

=== Out (Pre-Season) ===
Note: Flags indicate national team as defined under FIFA eligibility rules; some limited exceptions apply. Players may hold more than one non-FIFA nationality.

No.	Pos.	Nation	Player
—	MF	MKD	Gligor Gligorov (to HŠK Zrinjski Mostar)
—	GK	SGP	Hafez Mawasi (Released)
—	FW	SGP	Noh Alam Shah (Released)
—	DF	FRA	Benoît Croissant (Retirement)
—	DF	SGP	Syaiful Iskandar (to Warriors F.C.)

No.	Pos.	Nation	Player
—	FW	SGP	Ahmad Latiff Khamaruddin (to Tanjong Pagar United)
—	MF	SGP	Sazali Salleh (to Tanjong Pagar United)
—	DF	SGP	Ali Hudzaifi (to LionsXII)
—	GK	SGP	Amran Addin (Released)

=== Out (Mid-Season) ===
Note: Flags indicate national team as defined under FIFA eligibility rules; some limited exceptions apply. Players may hold more than one non-FIFA nationality.

No. / Pos. / Nation / Player; — / MF / ARG / Martín Wagner (Released)	No. / Pos. / Nation / Player; — / FW / SRB / Sead Hadžibulić (Released)

== Tanjong Pagar United ==
=== In (Pre-Season) ===
Note: Flags indicate national team as defined under FIFA eligibility rules; some limited exceptions apply. Players may hold more than one non-FIFA nationality.

No.	Pos.	Nation	Player
—	DF	SGP	Walid Lounis (from Gombak United)
—	FW	SGP	Ahmad Latiff Khamaruddin (from Tampines Rovers)
—	FW	FRA	Ismaël Benahmed (from Vendée Poiré sur Vie Football)
—	MF	ALG	Kamel Ramdani (from FC Montceau Bourgogne)
—	GK	FRA	Aurélien Herisson (from Vendée Poiré sur Vie Football)

No.	Pos.	Nation	Player
—	FW	MAR	Monsef Zerka (Free Agent)
—	MF	SGP	Sazali Salleh (from Tampines Rovers)
—	FW	SGP	Rizawan Abdullah (from Geylang International)
—	MF	SGP	K Vikraman (from Gombak United)
—	DF	SGP	Zulfadhli Emran (from Gombak United)

=== Out (Pre-Season) ===
Note: Flags indicate national team as defined under FIFA eligibility rules; some limited exceptions apply. Players may hold more than one non-FIFA nationality.

No.	Pos.	Nation	Player
—	FW	JPN	Takaya Kawanabe (to FC Jurmala)
—	FW	HAI	Gilbert Bayonne (Released)
—	MF	ARG	Carlos Delgado (Released)
—	GK	SGP	Fajar Sarib (Released)
—	MF	SGP	Sudhershen Hariram (Released)

No.	Pos.	Nation	Player
—	DF	SGP	Delwinder Singh (to Geylang International)
—	DF	SGP	Jonathan Xu (Released)
—	MF	SGP	Azlan Alipah (Released)
—	MF	SGP	Syed Karim (Released)

== Warriors F.C. ==
=== In (Pre-Season) ===
Note: Flags indicate national team as defined under FIFA eligibility rules; some limited exceptions apply. Players may hold more than one non-FIFA nationality.

No.	Pos.	Nation	Player
—	DF	SGP	Syed Fadhil (from Geylang International)
—	DF	SGP	Syaiful Iskandar (from Tampines Rovers)
—	FW	SGP	Sufian Anuar (from LionsXII)
—	GK	SGP	Hyrulnizam Juma'at (from LionsXII)

No.	Pos.	Nation	Player
—	DF	SGP	Abdil Qaiyyim (from LionsXII)
—	MF	JPN	Kazuyuki Toda (from F.C. Machida Zelvia)
—	MF	SGP	Shi Jiayi (from Home United)

=== Out (Pre-Season) ===
Note: Flags indicate national team as defined under FIFA eligibility rules; some limited exceptions apply. Players may hold more than one non-FIFA nationality.

No.	Pos.	Nation	Player
—	GK	SGP	Shahril Jantan (to Home United)
—	DF	SGP	Razaleigh Khalik (Released)
—	GK	SGP	Bah Mamadou (Released)
—	DF	SGP	Noh Rahman (to Home United)

No.	Pos.	Nation	Player
—	MF	SGP	Aliff Shafaein (to Home United)
—	GK	SGP	Rezal Hassan (Retirement)
—	FW	SGP	Fazrul Nawaz (to LionsXII)

== Woodlands Wellington ==
=== In (Pre-Season) ===
Note: Flags indicate national team as defined under FIFA eligibility rules; some limited exceptions apply. Players may hold more than one non-FIFA nationality.

No.	Pos.	Nation	Player
—	GK	SGP	Yazid Yasin (from Geylang International)
—	MF	SGP	Ang Zhiwei (from Geylang International)
—	DF	SGP	Shahril Alias (from Geylang International)
—	DF	SGP	Shariff Abdul Samat (from Tampines Rovers)
—	DF	SGP	Rosman Sulaiman (from Home United)
—	MF	JPN	Atsushi Shimono (from Albirex Niigata (S))
—	FW	SGP	Fadhil Noh (from Home United)

No.	Pos.	Nation	Player
—	MF	NED	Khalid Hamdaoui (Free Agent)
—	DF	SGP	Hidhir Hasbiallah (from Police SA)
—	FW	KOR	Jang Jo-yoon (Free Agent)
—	MF	SGP	Ridhwan Osman (from Hougang United)
—	MF	SGP	Taufiq Rahmat (from LionsXII)
—	DF	KOR	Cho Sung-hwan (from Ansan Hallelujah)
—	MF	SGP	Farouq Farkhan (from Gombak United)

=== Out (Pre-Season) ===
Note: Flags indicate national team as defined under FIFA eligibility rules; some limited exceptions apply. Players may hold more than one non-FIFA nationality.

No.	Pos.	Nation	Player
—	GK	SGP	Ang Bang Heng (Released)
—	DF	SGP	Danny Chew Ji Xiang (Released)
—	DF	SGP	Duncan Elias (to Geylang International)
—	DF	TTO	Fabien Lewis (Released)
—	DF	ENG	Daniel Hammond (Released)
—	MF	LBN	Hussein Akil (Released)

No.	Pos.	Nation	Player
—	DF	SGP	K Sathiaraj (Released)
—	MF	SGP	Guntur Djafril (Released)
—	MF	SGP	Han Yiguang (Retirement)
—	MF	SGP	Shamsurin Abdul Rahman (Released)
—	FW	SGP	Navin Neil Vanu (Released)

=== Out (Mid-Season) ===
Note: Flags indicate national team as defined under FIFA eligibility rules; some limited exceptions apply. Players may hold more than one non-FIFA nationality.

No. / Pos. / Nation / Player; — / DF / SGP / Fariss Haiqel (to LionsXII)	No. / Pos. / Nation / Player
