= 2013 S.League =

S.League
- Season: 2013
- Champions: Tampines Rovers; 5th S.League title
- AFC Champions League: Tampines Rovers (S.League winners)
- AFC Cup: Home United (Singapore Cup winners)
- Matches: 162
- Goals: 456 (2.81 per match)
- Top goalscorer: Aleksandar Đurić (15) (South Korea) Moon Soon-Ho (15)
- Biggest home win: Balestier Khalsa 4-0 Tampines Rovers (25 May 2013); Home United 4-0 (Malaysia) Harimau Muda B (26 August 2013)
- Biggest away win: Warriors FC 1-6 Tanjong Pagar United (27 February 2013)
- Highest scoring: Woodlands Wellington 3-6 Tampines Rovers (4 November 2013)

The 2013 S.League was the 18th season since the establishment of the S.League, the top professional football league in Singapore. It is known as the Yeo's Great Eastern S.League for sponsorship reasons.

The season began in February 2013 and ended in November 2013. Tampines Rovers defended their title and the 2013 edition featured 12 teams in the league after Gombak United decided to sit out of the league due to financial problems.

Tampines Rovers beat Warriors F.C. on 15 February 2013 with a 2–1 scoreline to lift the 2013 Charity Shield, kicking off the 2013 S.League season.

The league also saw a month-long break between 26 May 2013 and 26 June 2013 in order for the preliminary round of the RHB Singapore Cup and Starhub League Cup to take place.

== Major changes ==
The following were the key changes of season 2013 as compared to the previous season:

- Gombak United sat out of the 2013 S.League, turning it into a 12-team competition.
- This new "2.5 round" format saw the 12 teams split up into two halves based on their league standings after the completion of two rounds of fixtures.
- The final ‘half’ round saw teams (i.e.: top six teams in one group, bottom six teams in another group) playing against each other in their respective groups.
- All points accumulated in the 2 rounds were carried into the final round. The final standings were then decided at the end of this half round.
- The format for both Cup tournaments namely RHB Singapore Cup and Starhub League remained intact.
- The import quota was increased from four to five foreign players, with support promised from the league management should clubs be keen to engage a foreign marquee player in the new quota of five.
- The 2.4 km run replaced the "Beep Test" to gauge the fitness of the players with a minimum passing mark set at 10.15 minutes for outfield players and 12 minutes for goalkeepers. Monetary rewards were given out for players who hit the minimum passing mark of 8.30 minutes ($200) and 9 minutes ($100).
- There was an increase in prize monies for the league champions, first runners-up and second runners-up at $250,000, $125,000 and $60,000 respectively (up from $150,000, $75,000 and $40,000 respectively).
- The Singapore Cup winners, first runners-up and second runners-up had their share increased to $100,000, $60,000 and $40,000 respectively (up from $80,000, $40,000 and $20,000 respectively).

== Teams ==
Location of teams in 2013 S.League
Location of teams in 2013 S.League (Singapore teams)

Team	Coach	Stadium	Capacity	Location
(Japan) Albirex Niigata (S)	(Japan) Koichi Sugiyama	Jurong East Stadium	2,700	Jurong East
Balestier Khalsa	(Australia) Darren Stewart	Toa Payoh Stadium	3,900	Toa Payoh
(Brunei) DPMM FC	(Croatia) Vjeran Simunić	Hassanal Bolkiah National Stadium	30,000	Bandar Seri Begawan, Brunei
Geylang International	V. Kanan	Bedok Stadium	3,900	Bedok
(Malaysia) Harimau Muda B	(Malaysia) Razip Ismail	Pasir Gudang Stadium	15,000	Johor Bahru
Home United	(South Korea) Lee Lim-Saeng	Bishan Stadium	4,100	Bishan
Hougang United	Amin Nasir	Hougang Stadium	2,500	Hougang
Tampines Rovers	Tay Peng Kee	Clementi Stadium	4,000	Clementi
Tanjong Pagar United	(France) Patrick Vallee	Queenstown Stadium	3,800	Queenstown
Warriors FC	(England) Alex Weaver	Choa Chu Kang Stadium	4,600	Choa Chu Kang
Woodlands Wellington	Salim Moin	Woodlands Stadium	4,300	Woodlands
(Singapore) Young Lions	Aide Iskandar	Jalan Besar Stadium	8,000	Kallang

=== Managerial changes ===
Team	Outgoing manager	Manner of departure	Replaced by	Date
Tanjong Pagar United	Terry Pathmanathan	Sacked	(France) Patrick Vallee	Pre-Season
(Singapore) Young Lions	Robin Chitrakar	Reassigned to coach Singapore U16	Aide Iskandar	Pre-Season
Hougang United	(Croatia) Nenad Bacina	Took over as head coach of Tampines Rovers	(England) Alex Weaver	Pre-Season
Tampines Rovers	Tay Peng Kee	Appointed as Technical Director of Tampines Rovers	(Croatia) Nenad Bacina	Pre-Season
Warriors FC	Richard Bok	Resigned in Pre-Season	V. Selvaraj	Pre-Season
Tampines Rovers	(Croatia) Nenad Bacina	Sacked	Tay Peng Kee	28 May 2013
Hougang United	(England) Alex Weaver	Reassigned as Technical Director of Hougang United	Johana Bin Johari	
Warriors FC	V. Selvaraj	Resigned	(England) Alex Weaver	12 June 2013
Hougang United	Johana Bin Johari	Appointed caretaker coach	Amin Nasir	22 August

=== Team changes ===
- Gombak United withdrew their participation in the league based on financial considerations.
- Harimau Muda A was replaced by their 'B' side.
- Geylang United reverted to Geylang International.
- Singapore Armed Forces FC renamed themselves to Warriors FC.

=== Stadium changes ===
- Harimau Muda B used the Pasir Gudang Stadium in Johor, Malaysia, a change from the previous season where Harimau Muda A used the Yishun Stadium as their home ground in 2012.

== 2013 S.League Season Kits ==
(Japan) Albirex Niigata (S)		Balestier Khalsa		(Brunei) DPMM FC		Geylang International	
Home	Away	Home	Away	Home	Away	Home	Away
Kit Sponsor: Gol.Japan		Kit Sponsor: (England) Umbro		Kit Sponsor: (Italy) Lotto		Kit Sponsor: (Italy) Lotto	
Main Sponsor: (Japan) Canon		Main Sponsor: (Singapore) FTMS / (Singapore) Civic		Main Sponsor: None		Main Sponsor: None	

(Malaysia) Harimau Muda B		Home United		Hougang United		Tampines Rovers	
Home	Away	Home	Away	Home	Away	Home	Away
Kit Sponsor: (United States) Nike		Kit Sponsor: (Italy) Kappa		Kit Sponsor: (Singapore) Waga		Kit Sponsor: (Japan) Mikasa	
Main Sponsor: None		Main Sponsor: (United States) Coca-Cola		Main Sponsor: None		Main Sponsor: (Singapore) Komoco Holdings	

Tanjong Pagar United		Warriors FC		Woodlands Wellington		(Singapore) Young Lions	
Home	Away	Home	Away	Home	Away	Home	Away
Kit Sponsor: (Singapore) Thorb		Kit Sponsor: (Japan) Svolme		Kit Sponsor: (Singapore) Waga		Kit Sponsor: (United States) Nike	
Main Sponsor: (Singapore) SINGA Energy Drink		Main Sponsor: (Singapore) STA / (Singapore) United Engineers		Main Sponsor: (Singapore) ESW		Main Sponsor: (Singapore) Courts	

== Foreign players ==
Club	Player 1	Player 2	Player 3	Player 4	Player 5	Former Player
Balestier Khalsa	(South Korea) Park Kang-Jin	(South Korea) Kim Min-ho	(New Zealand) Paul Cunningham	(Nigeria) Obadin Aikhena	(Brazil) Vitor Borges	(South Korea) Jung Hee-bong (Sweden) Rasmus Fristedt
(Brunei) DPMM FC	(Portugal) Joao Moreira*	(Brazil) Rodrigo Tosi	(Brazil) Tales dos Santos*	(Lithuania) Artūras Rimkevičius*	None	(Croatia) Dino Drpić (Guadeloupe) Stéphane Auvray (Croatia) Ivan Bošnjak
Geylang International	(Japan) Shotaro Ihata	(Japan) Norihiro Kawakami	(Japan) Takuma Ito	(Serbia) Stefan Milojevic	(Slovakia) Jozef Kaplan	None
Home United	(South Korea) Kwon Da-kyung	**(South Korea)** Choi Jae-won	**(South Korea) Lee Kwan-woo**	(France) Sirina Camara	(Canada) Jordan Webb	(South Korea) Jang Hong-won (Japan) Masato Fukui
Hougang United	(Guinea) Mamadou M. Diallo	(England) Thomas Beattie	(England) Liam Shotton	(Canada) Jerome Baker	(Croatia) Igor Čerina*	(Nigeria) Robert Eziakor
Tampines Rovers	(Japan) Kunihiro Yamashita	(Japan) Seiji Kaneko	(Portugal) Andre Martins	(Portugal) Diogo Caramelo	(Portugal) Vítor Ladeiras	(Serbia) Sead Hadžibulić (Argentina) **Martín Wagner** (Croatia) Saša Dreven
Tanjong Pagar United	(Algeria) (France) Ismaël Benahmed	(France) Anthony Aymard	(France) Aurélien Hérisson	(Algeria) (France) Kamel Ramdani	(Morocco) **Monsef Zerka**	None
Warriors FC	(Japan) Tatsuro Inui	(Japan) Shimpei Sakurada	(Japan) **Kazuyuki Toda**	(Croatia) Marin Vidosevic	(Bosnia and Herzegovina) Mislav Karoglan	None
Woodlands Wellington	(Japan) Atsushi Shimono	(South Korea) Moon Soon-ho	(South Korea) Jang Jo-yoon	(South Korea) Cho Sung-hwan	(Thailand) Theerawekin Seehawong*	(Netherlands) Khalid Hamdaoui
(Singapore) Young Lions	(Canada) Sherif El-Masri	None	None	None	None	None

- Albirex Niigata (S) and Harimau Muda B are an all-Japanese and all-Malaysian team respectively and do not hire any foreigners.
- Players in **bold** are marquee player signings who command wages outside the monthly salary cap.
- Players in Asterisks(*) were players who arrived during the mid-season transfer window.

== League table ==
Pos	Team	Pld	W	D	L	GF	GA	GD	Pts	Qualification
1	Tampines Rovers	27	17	5	5	59	36	+23	56 (Note: Harimau Muda B were awarded a 3–0 victory against Tampines Rovers as the latter were found guilty of fielding an ineligible player. Tampines Rovers had won the original fixture 1–0.)	Qualification to AFC Champions League Qualifying Round 1 or AFC Cup Group Stage
2	Home United	27	16	3	8	42	25	+17	51	Qualification to AFC Cup Group Stage (Note: Qualified as 2013 Singapore Cup winners.)
3	(Japan) Albirex Niigata (S) (Note: The three foreign clubs – Albirex Niigata (S), DPMM FC and Harimau Muda B – as well as the Football Association of Singapore (FAS) under-23 team, Young Lions, are not eligible for any AFC competition spots.)	27	13	7	7	36	28	+8	46	
4	Balestier Khalsa	27	12	7	8	38	28	+10	43	
5	Woodlands Wellington	27	10	7	10	45	47	−2	37	
6	Tanjong Pagar United	27	9	9	9	36	34	+2	36	
7	Warriors FC	27	9	8	10	38	38	0	35	
8	(Brunei) DPMM FC	27	9	8	10	41	46	−5	35	
9	Geylang International	27	8	8	11	31	38	−7	32	
10	Hougang United	27	9	3	15	37	40	−3	30	
11	(Malaysia) Harimau Muda B	27	8	6	13	33	43	−10	30	
12	(Singapore) Young Lions	27	5	3	19	20	52	−32	18 (Note: Young Lions' opening four games were overturned and awarded as 3–0 victories to the opposing teams due to the fielding of ineligible players. In these four games, Young Lions had only amassed one point.)	

Source: RSSSF
Rules for classification: 1) points; 2) goal difference; 3) number of goals scored

== Results ==
=== Matchday 1 - 22 ===
Home \ Away	ALB	BAL	DPM	GLI	HMB	HOM	HOU	TAM	TPU	WAR	WLW	YLI
Albirex Niigata (S)		0–0	2–1	0–0	1–0	2–1	2–1	1–2	1–1	1–3	0–1	1–1
Balestier Khalsa	0–1		0–1	1–0	1–1	0–4	3–1	4–0	2–1	2–0	1–2	3–0
DPMM FC	0–2	1–1		4–2	3–1	3–2	3–3	2–6	0–1	0–2	1–0	1–1
Geylang International	2–2	2–2	0–1		2–0	1–3	2–0	0–5	2–1	0–3	1–2	0–1
Harimau Muda B	0–1	0–0	2–1	1–4		0–1	1–2	3–0	3–0	2–1	2–0	2–1
Home United	1–0	1–2	0–0	2–1	4–0		0–3	0–1	1–1	1–1	0–2	1–0
Hougang United	0–1	1–3	2–1	0–1	3–1	1–0		2–3	2–3	1–2	0–1	1–0
Tampines Rovers	3–3	2–1	1–1	1–0	2–1	4–1	3–0		3–1	1–0	3–1	3–0
Tanjong Pagar United	0–0	3–1	1–1	1–1	1–1	0–3	1–0	1–0		2–1	1–1	0–1
Warriors FC	2–3	1–1	3–1	0–0	2–1	0–1	4–2	0–1	1–6		1–1	3–0
Woodlands Wellington	2–1	3–1	5–2	0–0	1–2	0–3	0–0	3–3	2–3	2–2		5–2
Young Lions	0–1	1–3	0–3	0–1	1–2	0–2	0–3	2–4	0–4	0–0	1–3	

Updated to match(es) played on 30 August 2013. Source: S.League
Legend: Blue = home team win; Yellow = draw; Red = away team win.

=== Matchday 23 - 27 ===
Top 6
Home \ Away	ALB	BAL	HOM	TAM	TPU	WLW
Albirex Niigata (S)		1–2				3–1
Balestier Khalsa			0–1	0–0		3–0
Home United	3–1			2–0		
Tampines Rovers	1–3				1–1	
Tanjong Pagar United	0–2	0–1	0–1			
Woodlands Wellington			2–3	3–6	2–2	

Updated to match(es) played on 4 November 2013. Source: S.League
Legend: Blue = home team win; Yellow = draw; Red = away team win.

Group B
Home \ Away	DPM	GLI	HMB	HOU	WAR	YLI
DPMM FC		2–2		1–0		
Geylang International					3–0	1–0
Harimau Muda B	2–2	2–2				1–2
Hougang United		4–1	4–1			
Warriors FC	3–2		1–1	1–1		
Young Lions	2–3			2–0	2–1	

Updated to match(es) played on 6 November 2013. Source: S.League
Legend: Blue = home team win; Yellow = draw; Red = away team win.

== Season statistics ==
=== Goalscorers ===
Rank	Player	Club	Goals
1	Aleksandar Đurić	Tampines Rovers	15
1	(South Korea) Moon Soon-Ho	Woodlands Wellington	15
3	(Slovakia) Jozef Kapláň	Geylang International	14
3	(Bosnia and Herzegovina) Mislav Karoglan	Warriors FC	14
5	(South Korea) Chang Jo-Yoon	Woodlands Wellington	13
5	(Japan) Kazuki Sakamoto	(Japan) Albirex Niigata (S)	13
7	Khairul Amri	Tampines Rovers	12
7	(Morocco) Monsef Zerka	Tanjong Pagar United	12
7	Qiu Li	Balestier Khalsa	12
7	(South Korea) Lee Kwan-Woo	Home United	12
11	(Algeria) Kamel Ramdani	Tanjong Pagar United	11
12	(Canada) Jordan Webb	Home United	9
12	(Canada) Sherif El-Masri	(Singapore) Young Lions	9
14	(Guinea) Mamadou Diallo	Hougang United	8
14	(Brazil) Rodrigo Tosi	(Brunei) DPMM FC	8
16	(Portugal) João Moreira	(Brunei) DPMM FC	7
16	(Brunei) Mohd Shahrazen Said	(Brunei) DPMM FC	7
16	(South Korea) Park Kang-Jin	Balestier Khalsa	7
16	(Malaysia) Mohd Ridzuan Abdunloh	Harimau Muda B	7
20	Jamil Ali	Tampines Rovers	6
20	(Brazil) Tales dos Santos	(Brunei) DPMM FC	6
20	(France) Ismael Benahmed	Tanjong Pagar United	6
20	(Japan) Bruno Castanheira	(Japan) Albirex Niigata (S)	6
20	Fahrudin Mustafić	Tampines Rovers	6

=== Fastest Goal ===
As of 25 May 2013

Date	Name	Club	Goal Scored	Against
21 Apr	Shi Jiayi	Warriors FC	3rd min	Hougang United
23 Apr	(Algeria) Kamel Ramdani	Tanjong Pagar	3rd min	Geylang

=== Most Goals In A Single Match ===
As of 25 May 2013

Date	Name	Goals Scored	Club	Against
27 Feb	(Morocco) Monsef Zerka	3	Tanjong Pagar	Warriors FC
10 Mar	(Slovakia) Jozef Kapláň	3	Geylang	Harimau Muda B
17 Apr	(France) Ismael Benahmed	3	Tanjong Pagar	Young Lions

=== Highest Scoring Match ===
As of 25 May 2013

Date	Match	Score
27 Feb 13	Warriors FC vs Tanjong Pagar United	1 - 6

=== Club Disciplinary Records ===
Team	Games	Yellow card	Double Yellow Card/Ejection	Direct Red Card	Total Points
(Japan) Albirex Niigata (S)	13	13	0	0	13
Balestier Khalsa	15	37	2	1	46
(Brunei) DPMM FC	14	28	2	0	34
Geylang International	14	30	0	1	33
(Malaysia) Harimau Muda B	15	28	1	0	31
Home United	15	30	1	3	42
Hougang United	15	39	0	1	42
Tampines Rovers	13	28	0	0	28
Tanjong Pagar United	15	39	1	1	45
Warriors FC	13	26	0	1	29
Woodlands Wellington	15	33	3	2	48
(Singapore) Young Lions	14	27	1	2	36

Updated to games played on 27 June 2013
Points are awarded based on 1 point for each yellow card and 3 points for each sending off (regardless of sending-offs via two yellow cards or one red card)

=== Cards Handed Out By Match Officials ===
Includes all competitive matches. The list is sorted by alphabetical order when total cards are equal.

R	Name	S.League				RHB Singapore Cup				Starhub League Cup				Total				Points
R	Name	Matches Officiated	Yellow card	(yellow card) (yellow-red card)	Red card	Matches Officiated	Yellow card	(yellow card) (yellow-red card)	Red card	Matches Officiated	Yellow card	(yellow card) (yellow-red card)	Red card	Matches Officiated	Yellow card	(yellow card) (yellow-red card)	Red card	Points
1	Leow Thiam Hoe	10	54	3	3	1	4	0	0	2	8	0	2	13	66	3	5	90
2	Farhad Mohd	9	39	2	1	1	7	0	0	3	12	1	0	13	58	3	1	70
3	Muhd Taqi	11	44	0	2	0	0	0	0	2	9	2	1	13	53	2	3	68
4	Irwan Samsuddin	7	37	1	1	1	7	0	0	1	5	0	1	9	49	1	2	58
5	Sukhbir Singh	9	41	1	0	1	4	0	0	1	4	1	0	11	49	2	0	55
6	W Ravisanthiran	10	37	1	3	0	0	0	0	2	5	0	0	12	42	1	3	54
6	Abdul Malik	9	30	1	2	1	0	0	1	2	9	1	0	12	39	2	3	54
7	Jansen Foo	8	36	0	1	1	4	0	0	2	5	0	0	11	45	0	1	48
8	Ahmad A'Qashah	8	30	0	1	1	5	0	0	2	6	0	0	11	41	0	1	44
9	Yazeen Buhari	4	20	1	0	1	4	0	0	1	1	1	0	6	25	2	0	31
10	K Kalimuthu	2	9	0	0	0	0	0	0	1	4	0	0	3	13	0	0	13

Updated to games played on 27 June 2013
Points are awarded based on 1 point for each yellow card and 3 points for each sending off (regardless of sending-offs via two yellow cards or one red card)

== Attendance figures ==
Pos	Team	Total	High	Low	Average	Change
1	(Brunei) DPMM FC	0	0	0		n/a
2	Balestier Khalsa	0	0	0		n/a
3	Warriors FC	0	0	0		n/a
4	Home United	0	0	0		n/a
5	(Japan) Albirex Niigata (S)	0	0	0		n/a
6	Harimau Muda B	0	0	0		n/a
7	Hougang United	0	0	0		n/a
8	Tampines Rovers	0	0	0		n/a
9	Woodlands Wellington	0	0	0		n/a
10	(Singapore) Young Lions	0	0	0		n/a
11	Geylang International	0	0	0		n/a
12	Tanjong Pagar United	0	0	0		n/a
	League total					n/a

Source: S.League

There isn't any established attendance figures. Only 1 report on attendance for Round 1 between Young Lions vs Hougang where 1,586 spectators attended.

== S-League Awards Night Winners ==
Awards	Winners	Club
Player of the Year	(South Korea) Lee Kwan-Woo	Home United
Young Player of the Year	(France) Sirina Camara	Home United
Coach of the Year	(South Korea) Lee Lim-Saeng	Home United
Top Scorer Award	Aleksandar Đurić	Tampines Rovers
Top Scorer Award	(South Korea) Moon Soon-Ho	Woodlands Wellington
Fair Play Award	(Japan) Albirex Niigata (S)	
Referee of the Year	Abdul Malik Abdul Bashir	
