= 2012 Geylang United FC season =

Geylang United FC
2012 season
- Chairman: (Singapore) Leong Kok Fann
- Head Coach: (Singapore) Kanan Vedhamuthu
- Ground: Bedok Stadium
- S.League: 11th
- Singapore Cup: First round
- League Cup: Runners-Up
- Top goalscorer: League: Jozef Kaplan (14); All: Jozef Kaplan (16)

The 2012 season was Geylang United FC's 18th consecutive season in the S.League. The club also competed in the Singapore Cup and the Singapore League Cup.

== Squad ==
No.	Name	Nationality	Position (s)	Date of Birth (Age)
Goalkeepers
1	Ridhuan Barudin	(Singapore)	GK	5 September 1982 (age 44)
19	Yazid Yasin	(Singapore)	GK	24 June 1979 (age 47)
Defenders
2	Zul Elhan Fahmie	(Singapore)	MF	2 July 1988 (age 38)
4	Salim Abdul Rahim	(Singapore)	DF	24 October 1984 (age 42)
6	Shahril Alias	(Singapore)	DF	14 May 1984 (age 42)
8	Jalal Jasim	(Singapore)	MF	28 December 1980 (age 45)
11	Syed Fadhil	(Singapore)	DF	16 April 1981 (age 45)
14	Mubarak Ahamad	(Singapore)	DF	9 February 1989 (age 37)
20	Faizal Samad	(Singapore)	DF	9 July 1983 (age 43)
Midfielders
5	Ishak Zainol	(Singapore)	MF	9 May 1978 (age 48)
9	Stefan Milojevic	(France)	MF	6 February 1989 (age 37)
10	Michael King	(England)	MF	26 September 1991 (age 35)
12	Mathew Shiva	(Singapore)	MF	15 April 1988 (age 38)
15	Shah Hirul	(Singapore)	MF	7 May 1986 (age 40)
16	Ang Zhiwei	(Singapore)	MF	2 August 1989 (age 37)
17	Jozef Kaplan	(Slovakia)	MF	2 April 1986 (age 40)
18	Hassan Aziz	(Singapore)	MF	2 January 1989 (age 37)
Forwards
7	Rizawan Abdullah	(Singapore)	FW	8 April 1987 (age 39)
13	Mun Seung Man	(Korea)	FW	12 May 1989 (age 37)

== Mid-Season Transfers ==
=== In ===
Position	Player	Transferred From	Ref
MF	(France) Stefan Milojević	(France) USC Corte	
FW	(Korea) Seung-Mun Man	Free Transfer	

=== Out ===
Position	Player	Transferred To	Ref
MF	(England) Rhema Obed	(Greece) Serres F.C.	
FW	(England) Oliver Nicholas	Released	
FW	(Singapore) Ahmad Suhaimi	(Singapore) Gombak United	

== S.League ==
=== Round 1 ===
19 February 2012 1	(Singapore) Woodlands Wellington	3–1	(Singapore) Geylang United	Woodlands Stadium
19:30 (UTC+8)

3 March 2012 2	(Singapore) Hougang United	2–0	(Singapore) Geylang United	Hougang Stadium
19:30 (UTC+8)

11 March 2012 3	(Singapore) Geylang United	1–7	(Singapore) Home United	Clementi Stadium
19:30 (UTC+8)

16 March 2012 4	Brunei DPMM	4–1	(Singapore) Geylang United	Sultan Hassanal Bolkiah Stadium
20:10 (UTC+8)

23 March 2012 5	(Singapore) Geylang United	3–1	(Singapore) Balestier Khalsa	Bedok Stadium
19:30 (UTC+8)

29 March 2012 6	(Malaysia) Tanjong Pagar United	1–0	(Singapore) Geylang United	Queenstown Stadium
19:30 (UTC+8)

7 April 2012 7	(Singapore) Geylang United	1–5	(Singapore) Tampines Rovers	Jalan Besar Stadium
19:30 (UTC+8)

12 April 2012 8	(Singapore) Courts Young Lions	0–2	(Singapore) Geylang United	Jalan Besar Stadium
19:30 (UTC+8)

22 April 2012 9	(Singapore) Gombak United	2–0	(Singapore) Geylang United	Jurong West Stadium
19:30 (UTC+8)

26 April 2012 10	(Singapore) Geylang United	0–0	(Japan) Albirex Niigata (S)	Bedok Stadium
19:30 (UTC+8)

3 May 2012 11	(Singapore) Geylang United	0–2	(Malaysia) Harimau Muda A	Jalan Besar Stadium
19:30 (UTC+8)

=== Round 2 ===
10 May 2012 12	(Singapore) SAFFC	2–2	(Singapore) Geylang United	Choa Chu Kang Stadium
19:30 (UTC+8)

21 June 2012 13	(Singapore) Geylang United	1–1	(Singapore) Woodlands Wellington	Bedok Stadium
19:30 (UTC+8)

11 July 2012 14	(Singapore) Geylang United	1–2	(Singapore) Hougang United	Bedok Stadium
16:45 (UTC+8)

18 July 2012 15	(Singapore) Home United	3–7	(Singapore) Geylang United	Bishan Stadium
19:30 (UTC+8)

21 July 2012 16	(Singapore) Geylang United	1–3	Brunei DPMM	Bedok Stadium
19:30 (UTC+8)

23 August 2012 17	(Singapore) Balestier Khalsa	0–0	(Singapore) Geylang United	Toa Payoh Stadium
19:30 (UTC+8)

30 August 2012 18	(Singapore) Geylang United	0–0	(Singapore) Tanjong Pagar United	Bedok Stadium
19:30 (UTC+8)

21 September 2012 19	(Singapore) Tampines Rovers	2–1	(Singapore) Geylang United	Clementi Stadium
19:30 (UTC+8)

23 August 2012 20	(Singapore) Geylang United	2–0	(Singapore) Courts Young Lions	Bedok Stadium
19:30 (UTC+8)

10 October 2012 21	(Singapore) Geylang United	3–2	(Singapore) Gombak United	Bedok Stadium
19:30 (UTC+8)

20 October 2012 22	(Japan) Albirex Niigata (S)	1–1	(Singapore) Geylang United	Jurong East Stadium
19:30 (UTC+8)

24 October 2012 23	(Malaysia) Harimau Muda A	3–1	(Singapore) Geylang United	Yishun Stadium
19:30 (UTC+8)

1 November 2012 24	(Singapore) Geylang United	3–0	(Singapore) SAFFC	Bedok Stadium
19:30 (UTC+8)

== Singapore League Cup ==
30 July 2012 Group stage	(Singapore) Balestier Khalsa	1–3	(Singapore) Geylang United	Toa Payoh Stadium
20:30 GMT+8	Kim Min-ho 25'; Syed Thaha (yellow card) 29'; Shafuan Sutohmoh (yellow card) 68'; Paul Cunningham (yellow card) 90'	Report	Fabian Fwok (yellow card) 4'; Jozef Kapláň 18'; Nurhazwan Noraskin 41'; Michael King 64'; Amy Recha (yellow card) 90'	Referee: K Kalimuthu

2 August 2012 Group stage	(Singapore) Geylang United	2–0	(Japan) Albirex Niigata Singapore	Bedok Stadium
20:30 GMT+8	Stefan Milojević 43' (yellow card) 84'; Shah Hirul 54'	Report		Referee: Muhd Taqi

5 August 2012 Quarter-finals	(Singapore) Geylang United	1–0	(Singapore) Gombak United	Bedok Stadium
20:30 GMT+8	Mun Seung-Man 75'	Report	Adrian Dhanaraj (yellow card) 32'; Fairoz Hasan (yellow card) 85'	Attendance: 666; Referee: Ahmad A'Qashah

8 August 2012 Semi-finals	(Singapore) Geylang United	2–0	(Singapore) Tampines Rovers	Jalan Besar Stadium
20:40 GMT+8	Jozef Kapláň 45'; Jalal Jasim (yellow card) 79'; Stefan Milojević 83'; Mun Seung Man (yellow card) 88'	Report	Sazali Salleh (yellow card) 39'	Attendance: 680; Referee: Leow Thiam Hoe

11 August 2012 Finals	Brunei DPMM FC	2–0	(Singapore) Geylang United	Jalan Besar Stadium
20:45	Shahrazen Said 36'; Azwan Salleh 76'; Basiru Osman (yellow card) 84'	Report	Mun Seung Man (yellow card) 48'; Shah Hirul (yellow card) 69'; Jozef Kaplan (yellow card) 71'; Stefan Milojević (yellow card) 85'	Attendance: 1,874; Referee: Sukbir Singh

== Singapore Cup ==
18 May 2012 First round	(Philippines) Loyola Meralco Sparks FC	2–1 (a.e.t.)	(Singapore) Geylang United FC	Singapore
19:45 SST	M.A. Hartmann 62'; Park Min-ho 95'	Report	King 43'	Stadium: Jalan Besar Stadium; Attendance: 1,044; Referee: Leow Thiam Hoe
