= Patrick Vallée =

French football manager (born 1961)

Personal information
- Full name: Patrick Vallée
- Date of birth: October 4, 1961 (age 65)
- Place of birth: France
- Height: 1.65 m (5 ft 5 in)

Team information
- Current team: French Football Academy Singapore

Managerial career
- Years: Team
- 2009–2010: Pacy Vallée-d'Eure
- 2010–2011: Étoile
- 2011–2012: Compiègne
- 2012–2015: Tanjong Pagar United
- 2016–2017: Warwick Knights
- 2017: Warwick Knights (technical director)
- 2017–2018: Chengdu FA (Head of youth)
- 20220–: French Football Academy Singapore

Patrick Vallée is a professional French football manager. He is currently working as the Technical Director for French Football Academy in Singapore.

Vallée guided Étoile to win the 2010 S.League in their debut season where they became the first foreign club to win the league.

== Managerial career ==
Vallée started his professional managerial career with Pacy Vallée-d'Eure in 2009.

=== Étoile ===
In January 2010, Vallée was invited by newly launched club Étoile which plays in the Singapore S.League. In his first season in charge, he guided the club to win the league where they become the first foreign club to win the S.League title.

=== Compiègne ===
On 15 January 2011, Vallée returned to France to signed with third tier league club, Compiègne. He notably face off against the 2010–11 Ligue 1 champions club LOSC Lille during the 2011–12 Coupe de France Fourth Round tie on 21 January 2012. Vallée team managed to hold the game all the way until extra time before opponent Gianni Bruno scored in the 114th minute to knock Compiègne out from the cup. During the time of the match, Lille was using a handful of potential players in the starting line-ups with the likes of Mickaël Landreau, Aurélien Chedjou, Eden Hazard, Dimitri Payet, Mathieu Debuchy, Lucas Digne, Idrissa Gueye, Florent Balmont and substitute Joe Cole.

Vallée then left the club at the end of the season.

=== Tanjong Pagar United ===
On 30 November 2012, Vallée then returned to Singapore to signed with Tanjong Pagar United in preparation for the upcoming 2013 S.League season. On 22 February 2013 in his first game in charge, he guided the team to a 3–1 win over Balestier Khalsa. Vallée also guided the team all the way to the 2013 Singapore Cup Final ended up as runner-ups after losing 4–1 to Home United.

=== Warwick Knights ===
In January 2016, Vallée was then appointed as Singapore Football League semi-professional club Warwick Knights as the team head coach. On 10 July 2017, he was reassigned to the club technical director.

=== Chengdu Football Association ===
In August 2017, Chengdu Football Association recruited Vallée as their head of youth coach.

=== French Football Academy (Singapore) ===
In October 2020, Vallée returned to Singapore to joined the newly launched French Football Academy.

== Honours ==
=== As manager ===
- S.League: 2010
