= 2013 in Singaporean football =

Football in Singapore
- Season: 2013

Men's football
- S.League: Tampines Rovers
- NFL Division One: Police SA
- NFL Division Two: Singapore Khalsa Association
- NFL Division Three: Starlight Soccerites
- Island Wide League: Yishun Sentek Mariners
- Singapore Cup: Balestier Khalsa
- League Cup: DPMM FC
- Charity Shield: Tampines Rovers

Women's football
- Women's Premier League: Middle Rangers
- Women's Challenge Cup: Young Women

The 2013 season is the 61st season of competitive football in Singapore.

The season began on 20 February 2013 for the S.League, 1 March 2013 for the Prime League and 27 April 2013 for the NFL First, Second and Third Divisions.

== National teams ==
=== Singapore men's national football team ===
Following Radojko Avramović's resignation after Singapore's victory in the 2012 AFF Suzuki Cup, LionsXII coach V Sundramoorthy was announced as the stand-in head coach while the FAS searched for a new coach to fill the vacancy.

On 15 May 2013, former Belarus coach Bernd Stange was unveiled as the new head coach of the Singapore national football team.

==== Managerial changes ====
Team	Outgoing manager	Manner of departure	Replaced by	Date
Singapore	(Singapore) V Sundramoorthy	Relinquishment of Interim Position	(Germany) Bernd Stange	15 May 2013

==== Results and fixtures ====
===== Friendlies =====
1 February Friendly (Note: Non FIFA 'A' international match)	Bahrain	3 - 1	Singapore	Bahrain
	Mahmood Al Ajmi 19', 57'; Sami Al-Husaini 82'	Report	70' Safuwan Baharudin	Stadium: Bahrain National Stadium, Riffa

4 June Friendly	Myanmar	0 - 2	Singapore	Yangon, Myanmar
		Report	10' Khairul Amri; 12' Shaiful Esah

7 June Friendly	Laos	2 – 5	Singapore	Vientiane, Laos
	Ketsada Souksavanh 48'; Khonesavanh Sihavong 62'	Report	Indra Sahdan 7', 41'; Hariss Harun 27'; Gabriel Quak Jun Yi 84'; Hafiz Rahim 88'	Stadium: New Laos National Stadium; Referee: Sivakorn Pu-udom

===== 2015 AFC Asian Cup qualification =====
====== Group A ======
Team	Pld	W	D	L	GF	GA	GD	Pts	(Oman)	(Jordan)	(Syria)	(Singapore)
Oman	6	4	2	0	7	1	+6	14	—	0–0	1–0	3–1
Jordan	6	3	3	0	10	3	+7	12	0–0	—	2–1	4–0
Syria	6	1	1	4	7	7	0	4	0–1	1–1	—	4–0
Singapore	6	1	0	5	4	17	−13	3	0–2	1–3	2–1	—

2013

6 February 2013	Jordan	2–1	Singapore	Amman, Jordan
17:00 UTC+3	Abdallah Deeb 18'; Bani Attiah 52'; Hayel 55', 74'	Report		Stadium: King Abdullah Stadium; Attendance: 2,004; Referee: Valentin Kovalenko (Uzbekistan)

14 August 2013	Singapore	0–2	Oman	Singapore
19:30 UTC+8		Report	Said 15'; Al-Farsi 45'	Stadium: Jalan Besar Stadium; Attendance: 5,849; Referee: Masaaki Toma (Japan)

15 October 2013	Singapore	2–1	Syria	Singapore
19:30 UTC+8	Khairul 62'; Gabriel 82'	Report	Rafe 89'	Stadium: Jalan Besar Stadium; Attendance: 3,012; Referee: Kim Sang-Woo (South Korea)

15 November 2013	Syria	4–0	Singapore	Tehran, Iran (Note: Syria played their home matches outside the country due to security concerns.)
14:00 UTC+3:30	Malki 10'; Al Douni 83'; Jafal 86'; Al Agha 90+1'	Report		Stadium: PAS Stadium; Attendance: 50; Referee: Minoru Tōjō (Japan)

=== Singapore women's national football team ===
==== Results and fixtures ====
===== Friendlies =====
4 September Friendly	Chonburi	2-2	Singapore	Bangkok, Thailand
--:-- UTC+8				Stadium: Chonburi Stadium
Note: Bangkok training tour

5 September Friendly	North Bangkok	2-1	Singapore	Bangkok, Thailand
--:-- UTC+8				Stadium: North Bangkok Stadium
Note: Bangkok training tour

6 September Friendly	Bangkok Metropolitan	2-0	Singapore	Bangkok, Thailand
--:-- UTC+8				Stadium: Bangkok Stadium
Note: Bangkok training tour

19 October Friendly	Malaysia	2-0	Singapore	Kuala Lumpur, Malaysia
20:00 UTC+8	Jaciah Jumilis			Stadium: Padang SUK
Note: Singapore 16-Woman squad

== Singapore Selection XI ==
=== Singapore Olympic Foundation - Peter Lim Charity Cup ===
The Singapore Olympic Foundation - Peter Lim Charity Cup was an exhibition fundraising match between the Singapore Selection and 2013 Copa del Rey winners, Atlético Madrid.

The match was held at the Jalan Besar Stadium on 22 May 2013 and Atlético Madrid prevailed with a 2-0 scoreline with goals coming from Raúl García and Diego Costa.

22 May 2013 Exhibition	Singapore XI	0 - 2	(Spain) Atlético Madrid	Singapore
--:-- UTC+8		Report	Raúl García 29'; Diego Costa 87'	Stadium: Jalan Besar Stadium; Referee: Yazeen Buhari (Singapore)

== AFC competitions ==
=== AFC Cup ===
Singapore was represented in the 2013 AFC Cup by 2012 S.League champions Tampines Rovers and 2012 Singapore Cup winners Warriors F.C.

==== Group phase ====
===== Warriors FC =====
Group E
Team	Pld	W	D	L	GF	GA	GD	Pts
(Indonesia) Semen Padang	6	5	1	0	15	6	+9	16
(Hong Kong) Kitchee	6	4	0	2	18	7	+11	12
(India) Churchill Brothers	6	1	1	4	6	13	−7	4
(Singapore) Warriors	6	1	0	5	4	17	−13	3

5 March 2013	Semen Padang (Indonesia)	3–1	(Singapore) Warriors	Padang, Malaysia
15:30 UTC+7	Wilson 19'; Mofu 32'; Iskandar 86'	Report	Inui 41'	Stadium: Haji Agus Salim Stadium; Attendance: 9,225; Referee: Ma Ning (China PR)

12 March 2013	Warriors (Singapore)	2–4	(Hong Kong) Kitchee	Singapore
19:45 UTC+8	Inui 23'; Gunawan 29'	Report	Jordi 46', 51'; Lo Kwan Yee 62'; Cheng Siu Wai 75'	Stadium: Jalan Besar Stadium; Attendance: 1,151; Referee: Minoru Tōjō (Japan)

2 April 2013	Churchill Brothers (India)	3–0	(Singapore) Warriors	Pune, India
15:00 UTC+5:30	Vales 37'; Singh 44'; Chhetri 84'	Report		Stadium: Shree Shiv Chhatrapati Sports Complex; Attendance: 500; Referee: Yaqoob Abdul Baki (Oman)

10 April 2013	Warriors (Singapore)	1–0	(India) Churchill Brothers	Singapore
19:45 UTC+8	Franco 54' (o.g.)	Report		Stadium: Jalan Besar Stadium; Attendance: 1,362; Referee: Sgt. Win Cho (Myanmar)

24 April 2013	Warriors (Singapore)	0–2	(Indonesia) Semen Padang	Singapore
19:45 UTC+8		Report	Wilson 39', 60'	Stadium: Jalan Besar Stadium; Attendance: 378; Referee: Hettikamkanamge Perera (Sri Lanka)

1 May 2013	Kitchee (Hong Kong)	5–0	(Singapore) Warriors	Hong Kong
17:00 UTC+8	Jordi 18', 53', 88'; Cheng Siu Wai 62'; Tsang Kam To 72'	Report		Stadium: Mong Kok Stadium; Attendance: 1,097; Referee: Ko Hyung-Jin (Korea Republic)

===== Tampines Rovers =====
Group H
Team	Pld	W	D	L	GF	GA	GD	Pts
(India) East Bengal	6	4	2	0	13	6	+7	14
(Malaysia) Selangor	6	2	2	2	12	11	+1	8
(Vietnam) Sài Gòn Xuân Thành	6	2	2	2	9	12	−3	8
(Singapore) Tampines Rovers	6	0	2	4	12	17	−5	2

Source: RSSSF

6 March 2013	Tampines Rovers (Singapore)	2–3	(Vietnam) Sài Gòn Xuân Thành	Singapore
19:45 UTC+8	Amri 89'; Đurić 90+2'	Report	Amougou 22', 62'; Pham Thua Chi 84'	Stadium: Jalan Besar Stadium; Attendance: 1,238; Referee: Ng Chiu Kok (Hong Kong)

13 March 2013	Selangor (Malaysia)	3–3	(Singapore) Tampines Rovers	Shah Alam, Singapore
20:45 UTC+8	Doe 8', 54' (pen.); Amri 46'	Report	Đurić 20'; Imran 49'; Yamashita 71'	Stadium: Shah Alam Stadium; Attendance: 1,551; Referee: Kim Sang-Woo (Korea Republic)

3 April 2013	Tampines Rovers (Singapore)	2–4	(India) East Bengal	Singapore
19:45 UTC+8	Hadžibulić 28'; Amri 65'	Report	Hadee 19' (o.g.); Barisic 62', 87'; Edeh 64'	Stadium: Jalan Besar Stadium; Attendance: 1,082; Referee: Chaiya Mahapab (Thailand)

9 April 2013	East Bengal (India)	2–1	(Singapore) Tampines Rovers	Kolkata, India
15:15 UTC+5:30	Edeh 22'; Ralte 86'	Report	Esah 68'	Stadium: Salt Lake Stadium; Attendance: 7,000; Referee: Nivon Robesh Gamini (Sri Lanka)

23 April 2013	Sài Gòn Xuân Thành (Vietnam)	2–2	(Singapore) Tampines Rovers	Ho Chi Minh City, Vietnam
18:30 UTC+7	Amougou 18' (pen.); Oloya 42'	Report	Amri 15'; Hadžibulić 63'	Stadium: Thong Nhat Stadium; Attendance: 2,000; Referee: Wang Di (China PR)

30 April 2013	Tampines Rovers (Singapore)	2–3	(Malaysia) Selangor	Singapore
19:00 UTC+8	Asraruddin 50' (o.g.); Đurić 58'	Report	Taha 28' (o.g.); Amri 45', 76'	Stadium: Jalan Besar Stadium; Attendance: 839; Referee: Yudai Yamamoto (Japan)

== League competitions (Men's) ==
=== S.League ===
==== Team changes ====
- Gombak United withdrew their participation in the league based on financial considerations.
- Harimau Muda A were replaced by their Harimau Muda B.
- Geylang United reverted their name to Geylang International.
- Singapore Armed Forces FC were renamed to Warriors FC.

=== Singapore National Football League ===
Promotion and relegation (pre-season)

Teams relegated from NFL Division 1

- Singapore Armed Forces Sports Association
- Borussia Zamrud Football Club

Teams promoted to NFL Division 1

- Admiralty FC
- Sporting Westlake Football Club

Teams relegated from NFL Division 2

- Balestier United Recreation Club

Teams promoted to NFL Division 2

- Gambas Avenue Sports Club

=== Honours ===
==== League and Cup winners ====
Competition	Winner	Runner-up	Venue	Match Report
Charity Shield	(Singapore) Tampines Rovers	(Singapore) Warriors F.C.	Jalan Besar Stadium	Report
S.League	(Singapore) Tampines Rovers	(Singapore) Home United	N/A	
Singapore Cup	(Singapore) Home United	(Singapore) Tanjong Pagar United	Jalan Besar Stadium	
League Cup	(Singapore) Balestier Khalsa	Brunei DPMM	Jalan Besar Stadium	
FA Cup	(Singapore) Home United	(Singapore) Sporting Westlake	Jalan Besar Stadium	
Prime League	(Singapore) Balestier Khalsa	(Singapore) Home United	N/A	
NFL Division One	(Singapore) Police SA	Singapore Recreation Club	N/A	
NFL Division Two	Singapore Khalsa Association	(Singapore) Pioneer CSC	N/A	
NFL Division Three	(Singapore) Starlight Soccerites	(Singapore) Vipers FAA	N/A	
Island Wide League	(Singapore) Yishun Sentek Mariners	(Singapore) Kembangan CSC	N/A	

=== LionsXII ===
==== Malaysia Super League ====
Final standings

Pos	Team	Pld	W	D	L	GF	GA	GD	Pts	Qualification or relegation
1	LionsXII (Note: LionsXII was not eligible for any AFC competition spots as they were a foreign side.)	22	12	7	3	32	15	+17	43	
2	Selangor	22	10	10	2	31	17	+14	40	2014 AFC Cup group stage
3	Johor Darul Ta'zim	22	11	7	4	32	26	+6	40	
4	Kelantan	22	10	6	6	32	20	+12	36	2014 AFC Cup group stage (Note: Qualified as 2013 Piala FA winners)
5	Pahang	22	10	5	7	36	32	+4	35	

Source: RSSSF
Rules for classification: 1) points; 2) goal difference; 3) number of goals scored

==== Malaysia FA Cup ====
26 January 2013 Round of 32	(Selangor) PKNS	1-0	LionsXII	Johor, Malaysia
16:15 UTC+8	Fauzan Dzulkifli 18'	Report		Stadium: Pasir Gudang Corporation Stadium; Referee: Samsudin Ibrahim (Terengganu)

==== Malaysia Cup ====
28 September 2013 Quarter-finals 1st leg	LionsXII	1-0	ATM FA	Singapore
19:45 UTC+8	Madhu 39'	Report		Stadium: Jalan Besar Stadium; Attendance: 7,464; Referee: Nagor Amir Noor Mohamed (Kuala Lumpur)

4 October 2013 Quarter-finals 2nd leg	ATM	4-1 (4-2 agg.)	LionsXII	Selangor, Malaysia
20:45 UTC+8	Hariss 23' (o.g.); Marlon 33', 75', 83'	Report	Hafiz 48'	Stadium: Majlis Perbandaran Selayang Stadium; Attendance: 8,000; Referee: Nafeez Abdul Wahab (Johor)

ATM FA won 4–2 on aggregate.

== League competitions (Women's) ==
=== Honours ===
==== League and Cup winners ====
Competition	Winner	Runner-up	Venue	Match Report
Women's Premier League	(Singapore) Middle Rangers FC	(Singapore) Young Women	N/A	
Women's Challenge Cup	(Singapore) Young Women	(Singapore) H2O/ITE Dream Team	Bukit Gombak Stadium	Report
