= Tay Peng Kee =

Singaporean footballer and coach

Personal information
- Full name: Tay Peng Kee
- Date of birth: 19 October 1961 (age 65)
- Place of birth: Singapore
- Position: Forward

Senior career*
Years	Team	Apps	(Gls)
1989	Geylang International		
1979–1989	Singapore FA		

International career
- Singapore

Managerial career
- 1995: Tampines Rovers
- 2012: Tampines Rovers
- 2013: Tampines Rovers
- * Club domestic league appearances and goals

Tay Peng Kee is a Singaporean former football forward, and a current manager/coach.

Tay played for Geylang International in Singapore, and also played for Singapore FA in the Malaysia Cup tournaments. Internationally, Tay played for Singapore and was in the Singapore's 1984 Asian Cup squad.

As a coach, Tay has coached Tampines Rovers in 1995, long before he becomes the team general manager in 2011. In 2012, Tay were also appointed as the Stags technical director, replacing Vorawan Chitavanich. In this capacity, Tay had also returned as head coach twice; first in June 2012, replacing Steven Tan for the rest of the 2012 S.League season. The second time was in the next 2013 S.League season, when Tay replaced Nenad Bacina in late May 2013 until the end of the season. On both occasions, Tay guided the Stags to win the league.
