= Team Taranaki =

- Team Taranaki Emblem
- Founded: 2003
- Dissolved: 2018
- Ground: Yarrow Stadium, New Plymouth
- Manager: Ian McGrath
- League: Central Premier League
- 2017: 7th
Home colours	Away colours

Team Taranaki was an amateur association football composite club based in the Taranaki region of New Zealand which drew its players from the 13 local football clubs. After winning promotion in 2016, Team Taranaki contested the Central Premier League in 2017 then withdrew from the competition in 2018.

The core of the team was made up from local club-based players and was supplemented with some overseas amateur players. The concept was contractually supported by all of the senior men’s clubs operating in the Taranaki Province and the selected players were drawn from these 13 member clubs. Originally adopted and introduced in 2003, the concept was aimed to provide elite football opportunities to all players who wanted to achieve and play the best possible standard without having to leave Taranaki.

== Club history ==
The club was formed in 2003 as a composite team for the Central Federation Premier League, taking the place of Moturoa AFC which had withdrawn from the league after the 2003 season. Team Taranaki involved players from the individual football clubs in the Taranaki region. The club played its home matches at Yarrow Stadium, New Plymouth.

In 2006, they were promoted to the Central League and enjoyed four successful seasons competing against some of the most prestigious club teams in the country including Miramar Rangers, Napier City Rovers, Wellington Olympic and Western Suburbs.

The club was relegated from the Central League in 2007, to be replaced with Gisborne City. However, Gisborne City elected not to exercise their right to promotion as part of a club rebuilding strategy, and as such Team Taranaki were allowed to remain in the competition.

In 2010, the team was relegated to the Central Football region Federation League and commenced a rebuilding programme involving a new generation of young talent, which has seen incremental improvement in successive seasons, finishing 5th in 2011, 4th in 2012 and 3rd in 2013.

In 2014, Team Taranaki finished Runners Up to Wanganui Athletic losing narrowly in the final game of the season, having led the competition from the start. However, they had the satisfaction of reversing that disappointment by beating them 1–0 in the inaugural Federation League Cup final a few weeks later.

In 2015, Team Taranaki secured the Federation league title and was declared Champions after dominating the competition, but was unsuccessful in gaining promotion to the Central League, narrowly losing to the Wellington Phoenix Reserve team over a two leg play-off series.

In 2016, Team Taranaki secured the Federation League title for a second successive season and secured promotion to the Central League with a dramatic victory over Waterside Karori. Played over two legs (home and away), Team Taranaki found themselves 1-0 down following their home game in New Plymouth, but overturned the deficit in the away game to win 2-1 on the day (2-2 on aggregate).

In 2017, Team Taranaki competed in the prestigious Central Premier League competition against some of the best club teams in New Zealand. The team finished 7th.

== Dissolution ==
In 2018 the team withdrew from the Central Premier League prior to the start of the season. The manager Ian McGrath was quoted as saying "The player pool available in Taranaki simply isn't deep enough to support a team playing at Central League level and with seven key experienced local players unavailable this season due to a combination of work and personal commitments, retirement and injury it has proved impossible to replace them." The other issue was that squad players had to commit to extensive travel during the season.

== Players 2016 season ==
Note: Flags indicate national team as defined under FIFA eligibility rules; some limited exceptions apply. Players may hold more than one non-FIFA nationality.

No.	Pos.	Nation	Player
1	GK	CRC	Santiago Fernandez
3	DF	NZL	Jeremy Hill
4	DF	NZL	Paul Cunningham
5		NZL	John Willetts
6	DF	ENG	Jack Roberts
7	DF	NZL	Jeremy Hawkes
8	DF	NZL	Russel Laird
9		NZL	Ben Moore
10		NZL	Wade Randle
11		USA	Tyler Stephens
12		NZL	Rodrigo Mangini
13	MF	NZL	Nathan Hill

No.	Pos.	Nation	Player
14		ITA	Sandro Grandi
15		NZL	Ryan Holden
16	DF	NZL	Dom Squatriti
17		NZL	Sam De St Croix
18		NZL	Vance Hoskin
19		NZL	Mark Bland
20	FW	NZL	Joshua Smith
21	FW	NZL	Damien Mosquera
22		NZL	Sam Adeyinka
23	MF	NZL	Mustafa Can
24	FW	URU	Nicolas Varela
RGK	GK	NZL	Nick Hayward

== Players 2017 season ==
Note: Flags indicate national team as defined under FIFA eligibility rules; some limited exceptions apply. Players may hold more than one non-FIFA nationality.

No.	Pos.	Nation	Player
1	GK	CRC	Santiago Fernandez
3	DF	NZL	Jeremy Hill
4	DF	NZL	Paul Cunningham
5		NZL	John Willetts
6	DF	ENG	Jack Roberts
7	DF	NZL	Jeremy Hawkes
8	DF	NZL	Russel Laird
9		NZL	Ben Moore
10		NZL	Wade Randle
11		USA	Tyler Stephens
12		NZL	Rodrigo Mangini
13	MF	NZL	Nathan Hill

No.	Pos.	Nation	Player
14		ITA	Sandro Grandi
15	MF	NZL	Brad Hickling
16	DF	NZL	Dom Squatriti
17		NZL	Sam De St Croix
18		NZL	Vance Hoskin
19		NZL	Mark Bland
20	FW	NZL	Joshua Smith
21	MF	NZL	Stephen Kibby
22		NZL	Sam Adeyinka
23	MF	NZL	Mustafa Can
24	MF	CAN	Gavin Hoy
RGK	GK	NZL	Nick Hayward

== Staff ==
- (New Zealand) Ian McGrath (Coach)
- (New Zealand) Steve Kerfoot (Assistant Coach)
- (New Zealand) Joe Munro (Manager)
- (New Zealand) Troy Savage (GK Coach)

== Taranaki United ==
Another composite club Taranaki team, Taranaki United (TU), was formed in 1975 with the Taranaki clubs contributing players to a Central League side. The team continued as Moturoa, completing the 1975 season in the Central League second division, before being relegated. Taking over the league position for the 1976 Central League North Qualifying Division, TU won promotion back to the 1977 Central League second division undefeated. In 1982 New Plymouth Old Boys bought the Taranaki Football Co. as a limited company. Central City left the arrangement in 1983. The side continued playing under the Taranaki name for sponsorship purposes until the team was discontinued in 1984 with Old Boys retaining the Central League position.
