= 2013 Singapore Cup =

RHB Singapore Cup

Tournament details
- Country: Singapore
- Dates: 26 May – 8 November 2013
- Teams: 16

Final positions
- Champions: Home United
- Runners-up: Tanjong Pagar United
- Third place: Balestier Khalsa

Tournament statistics
- Matches played: 22
- Goals scored: 70 (3.18 per match)
- Top goal scorer(s): Monsef Zerka; Jozef Kapláň; 5 goals

The 2013 Singapore Cup was the 16th season of Singapore's annual premier club football tournament organised by Football Association of Singapore. Due to sponsorship reasons, the Singapore Cup is also known as the RHB Singapore Cup. Warriors FC, then known as Singapore Armed Forces FC, were the defending champions.

The final was played at Jalan Besar Stadium in Kallang, Singapore. Home United, who had finished as quarter-finalists last year, won by defeating S.League rival Tanjong Pagar United 4–1. This was Home's sixth Singapore Cup title, previously winning it in 2000, 2001, 2003, 2005, and 2011. Together with 2013 S.League champions Tampines Rovers, Home United fills the 2014 AFC Cup spot.

The defending champions Warriors were eliminated in the preliminary round, thus becoming the first team to leave the competition as title holders at this stage.

== Prize money ==
For the 2013 edition, Football Association of Singapore (FAS) increased the prize money for the champions, runners-up and second runners-up. A base fee of S$2,000.00 was awarded to losers in the preliminary round. For teams which failed to reach the semi-finals, FAS awarded S$4,000. Thereafter, the third and second runners-up receive a total of S$10,000.00 and S$40,000.00 (up from S$20,000.00) respectively, while the champions and runners-up receive S$100,000.00 (up from S$80,000.00) and S$60,000 (up from S$40,000.00) respectively.

- Preliminary round: S$2,000.00
- Quarter-finals: S$4,000.00
- Third runners-up: S$10,000.00
- Second runners-up: S$40,000.00
- First runners-up: S$60,000.00
- Champions: S$100,000.00

== Teams ==
A total of 16 teams participated in the 2013 Singapore Cup. Twelve of the teams were from domestic S.League and the other four were invited from the Philippines, Cambodia and Laos. Global FC, Boeung Ket Rubber Field and Lao Police Club are the champions of their respective countries' leagues in 2012.

S.League Clubs

- (Japan) Albirex Niigata (S)
- Balestier Khalsa
- (Brunei) DPMM FC
- Geylang International
- (Malaysia) Harimau Muda B
- Home United
- Hougang United
- Tampines Rovers
- Tanjong Pagar United
- Warriors FC
- Woodlands Wellington
- (Singapore) Young Lions

Invited Foreign Teams

- (Cambodia) Boeung Ket Rubber Field
- (Philippines) Global FC
- (Laos) Lao Police Club
- (Philippines) Loyola Meralco Sparks

== Format ==
The sixteen teams were drawn into two distinct pools in the preliminary round. They will play against one another in a single leg knockout basis. Winners of this round will progress and advance to the quarter-finals. Thereafter, matches are played in two legs with the exception of the one-match finals.

== Round and draw dates ==
Unlike previous editions where teams were drawn with a clear route to the final, clubs will now be drawn on a round-by-round basis. The clubs competing in each round of the competition will be drawn in pairs, with the tie to be played in a knockout format.

All draws are held at Football Association of Singapore headquarters in Kallang, Singapore unless stated otherwise.

| Phase | Round | Draw date | First leg | Second leg |
|---|---|---|---|---|
| Preliminary | Preliminary round | 1 May 2013 (The Float at Marina Bay) | 26 May – 1 June 2013 | |
| Knockout phase | Quarter-finals | 4 June 2013 | 22–25 July 2013 | 26–29 July 2013 |
| Knockout phase | Semi-finals | 17 September 2013 | 1–3 October 2013 | 4–7 October 2013 |
| Knockout phase | Third place playoff | 17 September 2013 | 7 November 2013 at Jalan Besar Stadium, Kallang | |
| Knockout phase | Final | 17 September 2013 | 8 November 2013 at Jalan Besar Stadium, Kallang | |

== Preliminary round ==
In the preliminary round, teams were drawn into two distinct pools. They played against one another in a single leg knockout basis. The draw for the preliminary round was held on 1 May 2013. The matches were played from 26 May to 1 June 2013. Winners of this round progressed and advanced to the quarter-finals.

| Team 1 | Score | Team 2 |
|---|---|---|
Pool A
| Loyola Meralco Sparks (Philippines) | 3–0 | (Malaysia) Harimau Muda B |
| Albirex Niigata (S) (Japan) | 2–3 | Home United |
| Woodlands Wellington | 1–4 | Geylang International |
| Hougang United | 2–1 | Tampines Rovers |
Pool B
| Lao Police Club (Laos) | 0–4 | (Brunei) DPMM FC |
| Tanjong Pagar United | 4–1 | (Cambodia) Boeung Ket Rubber Field |
| Young Lions (Singapore) | 0–1 | Balestier Khalsa |
| Warriors FC | 0–2 | (Philippines) Global FC |

== Knockout phase ==
In the knockout phase, teams play against each other over two legs on a home-and-away basis, except for the one-match final. The draw for the quarter-finals was held on 4 June 2013. The draws for the semi-finals, third place playoff and final were held on 17 September 2013.

=== Bracket ===
Preliminary round
Geylang International | 4
Woodlands Wellington | 1
Home United | 3
(Japan) Albirex Niigata (S) | 2
Hougang United | 2
Tampines Rovers | 1
Balestier Khalsa | 1
(Singapore) Young Lions | 0
Tanjong Pagar United | 4
(Cambodia) Boeung Ket | 1
(Philippines) Loyola Meralco Sparks | 3
(Malaysia) Harimau Muda B | 0
(Philippines) Global FC | 2
Warriors FC | 0
(Brunei) DPMM FC | 4
(Laos) Lao Police Club | 0

Quarter-finals
Geylang International | 0 | 2 | 2
Home United | 2 | 3 | 5
Hougang United | 2 | 0 | 2 (1)
Balestier Khalsa (P) | 0 | 2 | 2 (4)
Tanjong Pagar United | 2 | 3 | 5
(Philippines) Loyola Meralco Sparks | 1 | 3 | 4
(Philippines) Global FC | 1 | 4 | 5
(Brunei) DPMM FC | 0 | 4 | 4

Semi-finals
Home United | 1 | 1 | 2
Balestier Khalsa | 0 | 0 | 0
Tanjong Pagar United | 2 | 2 | 4
(Philippines) Global FC | 2 | 1 | 3

Final
Home United | 4
Tanjong Pagar United | 1
Third place playoff
Balestier Khalsa | 3
(Philippines) Global FC | 1

=== Quarter-finals ===
The first legs were played on 22, 23, 24 and 25 July, and the second legs were played on 26, 27, 28 and 29 July 2013. Winners of this round advance to the semi-finals.

| Team 1 | Agg. | Team 2 | 1st leg | 2nd leg |
|---|---|---|---|---|
| Geylang International | 2–5 | Home United | 0–2 | 2–3 |
| Hougang United | 2–2 (1–4 P) | Balestier Khalsa | 2–0 | 2–0 |
| Tanjong Pagar United | 5–4 | (Philippines) Loyola Meralco Sparks | 2–1 | 3–3 |
| Global FC (Philippines) | 5–4 | (Brunei) DPMM FC | 1–0 | 4–4 |

== Semi-finals ==
The first legs were played on 22, 23, 24 and 25 July, and the second legs were played on 26, 27, 28 and 29 July 2013. Winners of this round advance to the final, while the losers will vie for the third place in the third place playoff.

| Team 1 | Agg. | Team 2 | 1st leg | 2nd leg |
|---|---|---|---|---|
| Balestier Khalsa | 2–0 | Home United | 0–1 | 1–0 |
| Tanjong Pagar United | 4–3 | (Philippines) Global FC | 2–2 | 1–2 |

== Third place playoff ==
7 November 2013
19:30

| Balestier Khalsa | 1–0 | (Philippines) Global FC |
|---|---|---|
| Qiu Li 53'; Qiu Li (yellow card) 82' (red card) | Report | Amani Aguinaldo (yellow card) 85' (red card) |

Jalan Besar Stadium
Referee: (Singapore) Muhammad Jahari

== Final ==
8 November 2013
20:00 UTC+8

| Home United | 4–1 | Tanjong Pagar United |
|---|---|---|
| Sirina Camara 13'; Kwon Dakyung 15'; Lee Kwan-Woo 27'; Sofiyan Abdul Hamid 90'+2 | Report | Monsef Zerka 88' |

Jalan Besar Stadium
Attendance: 6,588
Referee: (Singapore) Abdul Malik

== Goalscorers ==
As of 1 June 2013.

| Rank | Nationality | Player | Club | Goals |
|---|---|---|---|---|
| 1 | (Portugal) | João Moreira | DPMM FC | 3 |
| 1 | (Slovakia) | Jozef Kapláň | Geylang International | 3 |
| 1 | (Philippines) | Carli de Murga | Global FC | 3 |
| 2 | (Spain) | Rufo Sánchez | Global FC | 2 |
| 2 | (Philippines) | Phil Younghusband | Loyola Meralco Sparks | 2 |
| 2 | (Brunei) | Shahrazen Said | DPMM FC | 2 |
| 2 | (Singapore) | Masrezwan Masturi | Home United | 2 |
| 2 | (Morocco) | Monsef Zerka | Tanjong Pagar United | 2 |
| 3 | (Japan) | Bruno Castanheira | Albirex Niigata (S) | 1 |
| 3 | (Japan) | Kazuki Sakamoto | Albirex Niigata (S) | 1 |
| 3 | (New Zealand) | Paul Cunningham | Balestier Khalsa | 1 |
| 3 | (Singapore) | Yasir Hanapi | Geylang International | 1 |
| 3 | (England) | Jordan Robertson | Global FC | 1 |
| 3 | (Philippines) | Misagh Bahadoran | Global FC | 1 |
| 3 | (South Korea) | Song Ui-Young | Home United | 1 |
| 3 | (Canada) | Jerome Baker | Hougang United | 1 |
| 3 | (Guinea) | Mamadou Diallo | Hougang United | 1 |
| 3 | (South Korea) | Jang Joo-Wong | Loyola Meralco Sparks | 1 |
| 3 | (Philippines) | James Younghusband | Loyola Meralco Sparks | 1 |
| 3 | (Singapore) | Aleksandar Đurić | Tampines Rovers | 1 |
| 3 | (France) | Ismaël Benahmed | Tanjong Pagar United | 1 |
| 3 | (Singapore) | Kamel Ramdani | Tanjong Pagar United | 1 |
| 3 | (Algeria) | Asraf Rashid | Tanjong Pagar United | 1 |
| 3 | (South Korea) | Moon Soon-Ho | Woodlands Wellington | 1 |
