= V. Selvaraj =

Singaporean footballer and coach

Vengadasalam Selvaraj
Personal information
- Full name: Selvaraj s/o Vengadasalam
- Date of birth: 16 December 1970 (age 55)
- Place of birth: Singapore
- Position: Forward

Senior career*
Years	Team	Apps	(Gls)
1996–1999	SAFFC		
2000	Tampines Rovers		
2001	Jurong FC		
2002	SAFFC		

International career
1995–2003	Singapore		

Managerial career
- 2006–2012: SAFFC (youth)
- 2013: Warriors
- 2017: Garena Young Lions
- 2021: Laos (assistant)
- 2021–2022: Laos U23
- 2021–2022: Laos
- 2022–2023: Laos U17
- * Club domestic league appearances and goals

Vengadasalam Selvaraj (born 16 December 1970) is a Singaporean former footballer who last played as a forward for the Singapore National Team in the 1990’s whose now a current football coach.

== Playing career ==
=== Club career ===
Selvaraj played for in the S.League, and also played for Singapore. He also played for in 1994, the last season the Singapore team participated in the Malaysian League and Malaysia Cup, winning the Malaysia Cup final that year.

In 1994, Selvaraj played for Singapore Lions as a striker in the Malaysia Cup. On 30 December, he scored his first goal for Singapore against Perak.

In 1996, Selvaraj joined SAFFC as a forward. From 1999, he was dropped behind and played as a defensive midfielder, defending and initiating attacks.

In 2002, Selvaraj left Jurong FC and rejoined SAF Warriors.

In 2004, Selvaraj considered retirement from football but extended for another year after speaking with Warriors' manager, Kok Wai Leong, and coach, Kim Poulsen.

== Coaching career ==
Selvaraj started his coaching career at SAFFC after he retired from playing in 2005, progressing through the coaching ranks until he becomes the head coach of the club, now renamed Warriors FC, at the start of the 2013 S.League season. He only lasted half a season as head coach, resigning in early June that year due to poor performances of the club in the league and elimination from all cup tournaments.

From 2015 to 2016, Selvaraj coached the NFA U15, who are taking part in AFF Championship, Lion City Cup and AFC Qualifiers.

Selvaraj returned to S.League in 2017, taking the helm of Garena Young Lions. However he resigned in May due to family reasons and was replaced by Richard Tardy.

In October 2018, Selvaraj became the coach of Laos' age-group national teams and also assisted V. Sundramoorthy in managing the Laos national football team. In October 2021, Selvaraj took over the senior team's head coach position from Sundramoorthy while Sundramoorthy became the Technical Director of the team.

== Honours ==
=== Singapore Lions ===
- Malaysia Cup : 1994

=== SAFFC ===
- S.League :1996, 1997, 1998, 2002
- Singapore Cup: 1997, 1998
