= Amin Nasir =

Singaporean footballer and manager

Personal information
- Full name: Mohamed Amin bin Nasir
- Date of birth: c. 1968
- Place of birth: Singapore
- Date of death: 16 January 2017 (aged 48)
- Place of death: Yishun, Singapore
- Position: Defender

Senior career*
Years	Team	Apps	(Gls)
- Sembawang Rangers
- Woodlands Wellington

International career
1990–1992	Singapore		

Managerial career
- 2013–2014: Hougang United
- * Club domestic league appearances and goals

Mohamed Amin bin Nasir (c. 1968 – 16 January 2017) was a Singaporean football player and manager. He played as a defender for sides including Sembawang Rangers and Woodlands Wellington. He managed the S.League side Hougang United from 2013 to 2014. He also represented the Singapore national football team and was awarded a bronze medal at the 1993 Southeast Asian Games. His brother, Nazri, captained the Singapore national team from 1997 to 2003.

Amin was first diagnosed with colon cancer in 2012. He died at Khoo Teck Puat Hospital on 16 January 2017 at the age of 48, more than four years after his original diagnosis. He had a wife and two children.
