= Jozef Kapláň =

Slovak footballer

Personal information
- Full name: Jozef Kapláň
- Date of birth: 2 April 1986 (age 40)
- Place of birth: Czechoslovakia
- Height: 1.80 m (5 ft 11 in)
- Position: Forward

Youth career
- 2006–2008: Ružomberok

Senior career*
Years	Team	Apps	(Gls)
2007–2008	ŽP Šport Podbrezová (loan)	24	(4)
2008–2012	Tatran Liptovský Mikuláš	79	(26)
2012–2013	Geylang United	57	(32)
2014	Negeri Sembilan	23	(5)
2014	Tampines Rovers	14	(3)
2015	Geylang United	27	(12)
2016	Hougang United	24	(3)
2017	Poprad	11	(3)
2017–2018	Tatran Liptovský Mikuláš	13	(1)
2018–2019	Chennai City	10	(0)
2019	Bešeňová	4	(0)

Managerial career
- 2019: Bešeňová (player-coach)
- 2021–: Ružomberok (assistant)
- * Club domestic league appearances and goals as of 9 March 2019

Jozef Kapláň (born 2 April 1986) is a Slovak professional footballer who plays for OŠK Bešeňová. He is able to take up the role of both a striker and an attacking midfielder. He is also a UEFA B License holder.

== Career ==
=== Earlier career ===
Kapláň began his professional club career at FK Železiarne Podbrezová in 2007 and played until 2008 before moving to Liptovský Mikuláš. With Liptovský Mikuláš, he appeared in 79 league matches and scored 26 goals between 2008 and 2012.

After being released by Liptovský Mikuláš in late 2011, Mike Wong signed him as a free agent. He ended his 2012 S.League season on high, scoring 17 goals in 34 games, becoming the club top scorer for that season. In 2013, the team management of Geylang International announced that Jozef Kapláň will be made as captain for the team.

He received the Singa-Goal.com player of the month "June 2013" award after scoring 3 out of 4 goals his team had scored in the month of June. During the 2012 and 2013 seasons, he scored a total of 32 goals for the side, appearing in 57 matches alongside captaining the Eagles.

In December 2013, he joined Malaysia Premier League side Negeri Sembilan, but in April 2014 he was back in Singapore, signing for Tampines Rovers. With Tampines, he lifted the Singapore Charity Shield in 2014.

=== Geylang International ===
Kaplan joined Singaporean club Geylang International for the 2015 S.League season. He is one of the leading top scorers in S.league. He is well known for his ability to peel off defenders due to his pace and dribbling skills, prominently in the opponent's half.

Kaplan is a prolific striker, with his 7 goals making him the league's highest-scoring midfielder for that season.

=== Hougang United ===
Kaplan joined Hougang United from Geylang International for the 2016 S-league season, undisclosed fee and appeared in 24 league matches, scoring 3 goals.

=== Chennai City ===
On 29 November 2018, he signed for I-League side Chennai City and appeared in 10 league matches for the club. He also clinched the 2018–19 I-League title with the club, managed by Akbar Nawas.

=== OŠK Bešeňová ===
On 23 August 2019, Kaplan returned to Slovakia and joined OŠK Bešeňová.

== Career statistics ==
=== Club ===
As of 14 July 2019.

Club	Season	2. Liga (Slovakia) League			FA Cup		League Cup		Continental Competition		Total	
Club	Season	Division	Apps	Goals	Apps	Goals	Apps	Goals	Apps	Goals	Apps	Goals
MFK Tatran Liptovský Mikuláš	2008/09	Slovak First League	?	?	?	0	0	0	0	0	?	?
MFK Tatran Liptovský Mikuláš	2009/10	Slovak First League	?	?	?	0	0	0	0	0	?	?
MFK Tatran Liptovský Mikuláš	2010/11	Slovak First League	?	?	?	0	0	0	0	0	?	?
MFK Tatran Liptovský Mikuláš	2011/12	2. Liga (Slovakia)	?	?	?	0	0	0	0	0	?	?
MFK Tatran Liptovský Mikuláš	Total		?	?	?	0	0	0	0	0	?	?
Club	Season	League			Singapore Cup		League Cup		AFC Cup		Total	
Club	Season	Division	Apps	Goals	Apps	Goals	Apps	Goals	Apps	Goals	Apps	Goals
Geylang International	2012	S.League	24	16	1	0	5	2	0	0	30	18
Geylang International	2013	S.League	25	14	3	4	3	2	0	0	31	20
Geylang International	Total		49	28	4	4	8	4	0	0	61	38
Club	Season	Malaysia Premier League			FA Cup		Malaysia Cup		Continental		Total	
Club	Season	Division	Apps	Goals	Apps	Goals	Apps	Goals	Apps	Goals	Apps	Goals
Negeri Sembilan FA	2014	Malaysia Premier League	23	5	0	0	0	0	0	0	23	5
Negeri Sembilan FA	Total		23	5	0	0	0	0	0	0	23	5
Club	Season	League			Singapore Cup		League Cup		AFC Cup		Total	
Club	Season	Division	Apps	Goals	Apps	Goals	Apps	Goals	Apps	Goals	Apps	Goals
Tampines Rovers	2014	S.League	14	3	5	2	4	2	0	0	23	7
Tampines Rovers	Total		14	3	5	2	4	2	0	0	23	7
Geylang International	2015	S.League	27	12	3	2	4	2	0	0	34	16
Geylang International	Total		27	12	3	2	4	2	0	0	34	16
Hougang United	2016	S.League	24	3	1	1	5	5	0	0	30	9
Hougang United	Total		24	3	1	1	5	5	0	0	30	9
Club	Season	2. Liga (Slovakia) League			FA Cup		League Cup		Continental Competition		Total	
Club	Season	Division	Apps	Goals	Apps	Goals	Apps	Goals	Apps	Goals	Apps	Goals
FK Poprad	2017/18	2. Liga (Slovakia)	11	3	3	0	0	0	0	0	14	3
FK Poprad	Total		11	3	3	0	0	0	0	0	14	3
MFK Tatran Liptovský Mikuláš	2018/19	2. Liga (Slovakia)	13	1	2	0	0	0	0	0	15	1
MFK Tatran Liptovský Mikuláš	Total		13	1	2	0	0	0	0	0	15	1
Club	Season	I-League			FA Cup		League Cup		AFC Cup		Total	
Club	Season	Division	Apps	Goals	Apps	Goals	Apps	Goals	Apps	Goals	Apps	Goals
Chennai City F.C.	2018/19	I-League	9	0	0	0	0	0	0	0	9	0
Chennai City F.C.	Total		9	0	0	0	0	0	0	0	9	0
Career total			13	6	0	0	0	0	6	2	19	8

== Honours ==
Železiarne Podbrezová

- Slovak First League runner-up: 2007–08

Tampines Rovers

- Singapore Charity Shield: 2014
- Singapore League Cup: 2014

Chennai City

- I-League: 2018–19

== See also ==
- Slovak expatriate footballers
