= Syaiful Iskandar =

Singaporean footballer

Personal information
- Full name: Syaiful Iskandar bin Zolkepli
- Date of birth: March 19, 1985 (age 41)
- Place of birth: Singapore
- Height: 1.75 m (5 ft 9 in)
- Position: Defender

Team information
- Current team: Nil

Senior career*
Years	Team	Apps	(Gls)
2004–2009	Woodlands Wellington FC	29	(0)
2010–2011	SAFFC	24	(0)
2012–2012	Tampines Rovers	1	(0)
2013–2013	Warriors F.C.		
- * Club domestic league appearances and goals as of November 4, 2012

Syaiful Iskandar is a Singaporean footballer who used to play for Warriors & Tampines Rovers as a defender. He can operate either as a left back or left wing-back.

== S.League career ==
Syaiful Iskandar started off his career as a youth player in Woodlands Wellington since 1997 and was promoted to the Rams' senior squad in 2004 before he joined SAFFC in the 2010 S.League season.

After spending two seasons with the Warriors, he moved to Tampines Rovers in 2012, earning himself a winner's medal with Tampines as the Stags retained their 2nd consecutive S.League title at the end of the 2012 S.League season. He was also a Singapore Cup runner-up with Tampines when they lost 2–1 to SAFFC in the 2012 Singapore Cup final.

=== Club career statistics ===
As of 4 November 2012

Syaiful Iskandar's Profile

Club Performance		League		Cup		League Cup		Champions League		Total				
Singapore		S.League		Singapore Cup		League Cup		AFC Champions League		Total				
Club	Season	Apps	Goals	Apps	Goals	Apps	Goals	Apps	Goals	Yellow card	(yellow card) (yellow-red card)	Red card	Apps	Goals
Woodlands Wellington	2009	29	0	0	0	0	0	-	-	5	0	0	29	0
SAFFC	2010	9 (3)	0	0	0	0	0	1 (2)	0	3	1	0	10 (5)	0
SAFFC	2011	7 (5)	0	2	0	0	0	-	-	3	0	0	9 (5)	0
Tampines Rovers	2012	0 (1)	0	0	0	0	0	0 (1)*	0	1	0	0	0 (2)	0

All numbers encased in brackets signify substitute appearances.
*Tampines Rovers appeared in the AFC Cup in 2012.
