= Shah Hirul =

Singaporean footballer

Personal information
- Date of birth: 7 May 1986 (age 40)
- Place of birth: Singapore
- Position: Midfielder

Team information
- Current team: Balestier Khalsa

Youth career
- 2006–2010: Geylang International

Senior career*
Years	Team	Apps	(Gls)
2011–2015	Geylang International	0	(0)
2016	Balestier Khalsa	18	(0)
- * Club domestic league appearances and goals as of December 28, 2016

Shah Hirul is a Singaporean footballer who plays for Balestier Khalsa as a midfielder.

Before moving to the Tigers, he was with Geylang International.

== Club career ==
=== Geylang International ===
He has been with Geylang International FC since he was 16 year old, playing in their youth team before being promoted to the senior squad. He was part of the squad that won the Singapore Cup in 2009.

=== Balestier Khalsa ===
In 2016, after being released by the Eagle, he joined the Tiger. He extended his contract for another year in 2017.
