= Nenad Baćina =

Croatian footballer and manager

Personal information
- Date of birth: July 29, 1971 (age 55)
- Place of birth: Split, SR Croatia
- Height: 1.84 m (6 ft 0 in)
- Position: Defender

Senior career*
Years	Team	Apps	(Gls)
1993–1996	Primorac	53+	(3+)
1996–1999	Mladost 127	38	(1)
1999–2000	Belišće		
2000–2005	SAFFC		

Managerial career
- 2005–2008: NK Spinut Soccer Clinic (academy coach)
- 2008: PDRM (coach advisor)
- 2009: Woodlands Wellington
- 2010–2011: NK Sloga (academy coach)
- 2012: Hougang United
- 2013: Tampines Rovers
- 2014: Johor Darul Ta'zim (assistant)
- 2015: Johor Darul Ta'zim II
- 2016: Penang
- 2017–2019: Malaysia U19 (assistant)
- 2020: PSM Makassar (assistant)
- 2021–2022: Kuala Lumpur City (assistant)
- 2022–2023: Al-Fayha (academy director)
- 2023–2024 manager: Kuala Lumpur City
- * Club domestic league appearances and goals

Nenad Baćina (born July 29, 1971) is a Croatian football manager and former player. He holds a UEFA Pro Coaching License.

== Club career ==
Baćina was born in 1971 in Split, Croatia. As a professional football player he played with several Croatian First League clubs, including NK Primorac, NK Mladost 127, NK Belišće, between 1989 and 1999.

Between 2000 and 2005 he played at the Singaporean S.League club, Singapore Armed Forces Football Club (SAFFC), and he won two S.League Championships in 2000 and 2002. For three seasons he was the team captain.

During his professional football playing career he graduated from the University of Split as a professor of Physical Education and Sport Science.

== Coaching career ==
In 2005, Baćina returned to his native country Croatia to start his coaching career as the youth development coach at the NK Spinut Soccer Clinic.

=== PDRM FC ===
Three years later in 2008, Baćina joined Malaysian Super League club, PDRM as the head coach advisor and technical Consultant during the 2008 Malaysian Cup competition. PDRM reached the Malaysia Cup quarterfinals.

=== Woodlands Wellington ===
In 2009, Baćina returned to Singapore after four years and was appointed as the head coach of Woodlands Wellington for the 2009 S.League season.

=== NK Sloga ===
Baćina then returned to Croatia to join NK Sloga as the senior team assistant head coach and the head coach of the club academy from February 2010 until June 2011.

=== Hougang United ===
In December 2011, he returned to Singapore and was appointed the head coach of Hougang United for the upcoming 2011 S.League.

=== Tampines Rovers ===
In December 2012, Baćina was appointed as the head coach of Tampines Rovers, the defending champion of the 2011 S.League. Throughout the season, he was relieved from his job in May 2013 after perceived failure in the 2012 AFC Cup, although the club were leading the 2012 S.League at the time of his dismissal.

=== Johor Darul Ta'zim ===
Baćina was named as assistant coach of Malaysian club Johor Darul Ta'zim in March 2014, assisting his compatriot Bojan Hodak. In May 2015, Baćina was appointed as the head coach of Johor Darul Ta'zim II.

=== Penang FA ===
In 2016, Baćina was appointed as the team manager and head coach of Penang FA.

=== Malaysia U-19 ===
In August 2017, Baćina was appointed as the assistant manager of the Malaysia national under-19 football team.

=== PSM Makassar ===
In February 2020, Baćina moved to Indonesia as he was appointed as the assistant coach of PSM Makassar linking up to his compatriot since 2014, Bojan Hodak, the head coach at the Indonesian club.

=== Kuala Lumpur City ===
In April 2021, Baćina returned to the Malaysia Super League, joining Hodak again as his assistant coach of Kuala Lumpur City.

In his time with Kuala Lumpur City, he helped the club to become the 2021 Malaysia Cup champions and 2022 AFC Cup runner-ups.

=== Al-Fayha ===
In December 2022, Baćina was appointed as academy director of Al-Fayha, which plays in the Saudi Professional League, the first tier of Saudi Football.

=== Kuala Lumpur City ===
On 4 August 2023, Baćina returned to Kuala Lumpur City, this time as the head coach of the club.

=== Kalba FC ===
On 21 July 2025, Bacina signed 10 months contract with Kalba Fc, from UAE,as the head coach of Kalba U23 team!
