= Wahyudi Wahid =

Singaporean footballer

Personal information
- Full name: Wahyudi bin Abdul Wahid
- Date of birth: 29 October 1989 (age 37)
- Place of birth: Singapore
- Height: 1.72 m (5 ft 7 1/2 in)
- Position: Centre-back

Team information
- Current team: Hougang United
- Number: 22

Youth career
- 2004–2005: Tanjong Pagar United
- 2005–2008: National Football Academy

Senior career*
Years	Team	Apps	(Gls)
2008	Geylang International		
2009–2011	Home United		
2011	Geylang International	1	(0)
2013–2014	Geylang International	24	(2)
2014	Hougang United	25	(0)
2015	LionsXII		
2016–	Hougang United	6	(0)

International career^{‡}
2006	Singapore U16		
2007	Singapore U17		
2008	Singapore U18		
- * Club domestic league appearances and goals as of 11:26, 24 May 2016 (UTC) ‡ National team caps and goals as of 14:00, 12 October 2015 (UTC)

Wahyudi bin Abdul Wahid (born 29 October 1989) is a Singaporean professional footballer who currently plays as a defender for Hougang United in the S.League. He started off playing as a striker, but converted to a centre-back role in recent years partly due to severe competition for places in the forward roles during early parts of his footballing career. Wahyudi started off playing for Tanjong Pagar United when he was just fifteen years old, subsequently playing for a multitude of clubs before joining LionsXII.

== Early life ==
Wahyudi started playing football at the age of nine, but football was not his first love. He started off participating in his elementary school band, before joining the school football team after many of his friends did so. Wahyudi did not even have a proper pair of soccer boots during his first training session, and used his school shoes to play then. It was his speed and shooting skills that ultimately earned the favour of his school coach and got him selected into the school team.

Wahyudi took his first step towards building his footballing career when he turned out for Tanjong Pagar United's Centre of Excellence trials at the age of fifteen. His impressive performance for the trial got him playing for the club, but ended prematurely after half a season as undesirable school results prompted his father to pull him out of football, so as to concentrate on his studies.

Following his withdrawal, Wahyudi received help from his school and club coach, Kames Bidin, whom successfully persuaded his father to let him rejoin the team for a zonal tournament. During his time playing with the Tanjong Pagar United team, Wahyudi was scouted by the National Football Academy (NFA)'s coach, Mike Wong, to go for a trial at the academy. He did break into the NFA's team, but only played a minor role in most competitions due to major competition in his position. Following a 3-year stint with the U16, U17 and U18 sides, Wahyudi dropped out of the national setup subsequently.

== Club career ==
=== Geylang International ===
Wahyudi went on to join Geylang International's squad that played in the Prime League, Singapore's second tier of football, until he enlisted for national service. During his national service term, he played for Home United's Prime League squad as that was his only eligible option then. Post-national service, Wahyudi returned to play for Geylang United's Prime League team for one season and won the league that year, his third consecutive after winning twice with the Home United team. Wahyudi also made his professional debut, coming on for fifteen minutes in a match against Balestier Khalsa as a substitute on 11 March 2011. The match ended in a 3-0 loss for Geylang International.

Following the sole season with Geylang International after winning three Prime League titles in a row, Wahyudi became disillusioned with the prospect of continuing his professional footballing career, and retired from the game, albeit temporarily. For a period of ten months, he took up a sailor job, but found he had no interest at all. It was until 2013 when Wahyudi called then-coach of Geylang International, Kanan Vedhamuthu, to inquire about the prospect of returning to the club, which he ultimately did.

=== Hougang United ===
After a full season of S.League football with Geylang International, Wahyudi moved on to join S.League competitor Hougang United. During his time at the club, his performance caught the eye of the coaches of LionsXII, which plays in the Malaysia Super League. Wahyudi subsequently joined up with LionsXII for the 2015 Malaysia Super League season, and has proved himself a trustworthy defender, after standing in for teammate Afiq Yunos during his injury, and striking a defensive partnership with Madhu Mohana.

Following the dismissal of LionsXII from the Malaysia Super League at the end of the 2015 Malaysia Super League season, Wahyudi subsequently rejoined Hougang United to participate in the 2016 S.League season. On 26 February 2016, Wahyudi made his first competitive appearance for his second spell with Hougang United in a S.League fixture against Tampines Rover, which eventually ended in a 4-1 loss.

== International career ==
Wahyudi has represented Singapore in national football at the U16, U17 and U18 levels, but has never been called up to represent the Singapore's national senior football team.
