= Norihiro Kawakami =

Japanese footballer (born 1987)

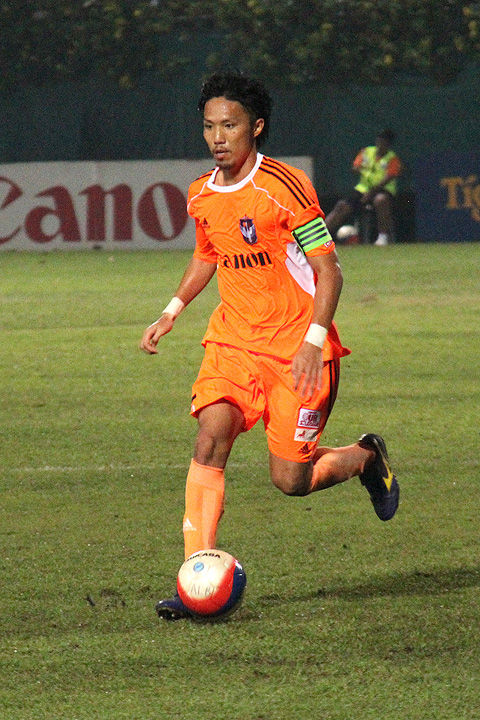

Personal information
- Full name: Norihiro Kawakami
- Date of birth: April 4, 1987 (age 39)
- Place of birth: Izumo, Shimane, Japan
- Height: 1.84 m (6 ft 1/2 in)
- Position: Defender

Team information
- Current team: Young Elephant F.C.
- Number: 47

Youth career
- 2003–2005: Shimane Prefectural; Taisha High School

Senior career*
Years	Team	Apps	(Gls)
2006–2008	JEF United Chiba	0	(0)
2006–2008	→ JEF Reserves (loan)	59	(3)
2009	Tochigi SC	6	(1)
2010	Zweigen Kanazawa	0	(0)
2011–2012	Albirex Niigata Singapore		
2013	Geylang International		
2014	Tampines Rovers		
2014	Albirex Niigata Singapore		
2016	SC Sagamihara	0	(0)
2017–2020	Tegevajaro Miyazaki	15	(4)
2020	Lao Toyota	10	(1)
2021	Young Elephant FC	5	(0)
Medal record
JEF United Chiba
Winner	J.League Cup	2006
- * Club domestic league appearances and goals as of 22 February 2018

Norihiro Kawakami (川上 典洋, Kawakami Norihiro; born April 4, 1987) is a Japanese professional footballer who last played for Young Elephant F.C. in the Lao League 1 as a defender.

== Career ==
After the season ended, he was transferred to Geylang International along with his teammate Takuma Ito. His primary position is a centre back. After the end of the 2013 season, he went on to sign for Tampines Rovers. However, he was deemed as surplus to requirements to the Stags, hence was transferred to Albirex Niigata Singapore once again in the mid-season transfer window of 2014.

Norihiro made his second debut for the White Swans in a 7–1 home victory against Woodlands Wellington on 11 June 2014, where he scored from a header in the 17th minute.

== Career statistics ==
Updated to 22 February 2018.

Appearances and goals by club, season and competition
Club	Season	League			Emperor's Cup		J.League Cup		Total	
Club	Season	Division	Apps	Goals	Apps	Goals	Apps	Goals	Apps	Goals
JEF United Chiba	2006	J1 League	0	0	0	0	0	0	0	0
JEF United Chiba	2007	J1 League	0	0	0	0	0	0	0	0
JEF United Chiba	2008	J1 League	0	0	0	0	0	0	0	0
Tochigi SC	2009	J2 League	6	1	0	0	—		6	1
Zweigen Kanazawa	2010	JFL	0	0	0	0	—		0	0
SC Sagamihara	2016	J3 League	0	0	—		—		0	0
Tegevajaro Miyazaki	2017	JRL (Kyushu)	15	4	—		—		15	4
Career total			6	1	0	0	0	0	6	1

== Honours ==
=== Club ===
Albirex Niigata Singapore

- Singapore League Cup: 2011

Tampines Rovers

- Singapore Charity Shield: 2014
