= Takuma Ito (footballer) =

Japanese footballer

Takuma Ito 伊藤拓真
Personal information
- Date of birth: August 11, 1986 (age 40)
- Place of birth: Yuzawa, Japan
- Height: 1.82 m (5 ft 11 1/2 in)
- Position: Goalkeeper

Youth career
- 2005–2008: Waseda University

Senior career*
Years	Team	Apps	(Gls)
2009–2011	Thespa Kusatsu	5	(0)
2012	Albirex Niigata Singapore	24	(0)
2013	Geylang International	23	(0)
2014–2018	ReinMeer Aomori	84	(0)
- * Club domestic league appearances and goals as of December 31, 2017

Takuma Ito (伊藤 拓真, Itō Takuma; born August 11, 1986) is a retired Japanese football player. He last played for ReinMeer Aomori in Japan Football League.

== Career ==
He has previous played in Singapore's S.League for Albirex Niigata FC (Singapore) and Geylang International. He started his career with Thespa Kusatsu.

== Club statistics ==
Updated to 20 February 2019.

Japan	Season	League			Cup		League Cup		Total	
Japan	Season	Division	Apps	Goals	Apps	Goals	Apps	Goals	Apps	Goals
Thespa Kusatsu	2009	J2 League	0	0	0	0	-		0	0
Thespa Kusatsu	2010	J2 League	5	0	0	0	-		5	0
Thespa Kusatsu	2011	J2 League	0	0	0	0	-		0	0
Singapore	Season	League			Cup		League Cup		Total	
Singapore	Season	Division	Apps	Goals	Apps	Goals	Apps	Goals	Apps	Goals
Albirex Niigata Singapore	2012	S.League	24	0	3	0	3	0	30	0
Geylang International	2013	S.League	23	0	3	0	3	0	29	0
Japan	Season	League			Cup		League Cup		Total	
Japan	Season	Division	Apps	Goals	Apps	Goals	Apps	Goals	Apps	Goals
ReinMeer Aomori	2014	JRL (Tohoku, Div. 1)	9	0	–		–		9	0
ReinMeer Aomori	2015	JRL (Tohoku, Div. 1)	18	0	1	0	–		19	0
ReinMeer Aomori	2016	JFL	30	0	–		–		30	0
ReinMeer Aomori	2017	JFL	24	0	–		–		24	0
ReinMeer Aomori	2018	JFL	3	0	0	0	–		3	0
Career total			136	0	7	0	6	0	149	0
