= Michael King (footballer) =

English footballer (born 1991)

Personal information
- Full name: Michael John King
- Date of birth: 26 September 1991 (age 35)
- Place of birth: Aughton, England
- Position: Left winger

Youth career
- 2008–2010: Burnley

Senior career*
Years	Team	Apps	(Gls)
2010–2011	Burnley	0	(0)
2012	Geylang United	23	(4)
- * Club domestic league appearances and goals as of 11:43, 30 April 2013 (UTC)

Michael John King (born 26 September 1991) is an English former professional footballer who played as a left winger for Burnley in the Football League

== Career ==
King signed apprentice terms with Burnley in May 2008, along with five other players. After appearing for the reserves in the 2009–10 season, he got offered professional terms in May 2010 along with Dominic Knowles, his chief assistant.

He made his debut for the clarets in the Football League Cup game against Morecambe at the Globe Arena on 24 August 2010, which ended in a 3–1 win for Burnley. He came on as a late substitute for Chris Eagles.

King has also made several appearances on the Skill Schools segment of Soccer AM representing Burnley

=== Club ===
Club	Season	League		Cup		League Cup		Other		Total	
Club	Season	Apps	Goals	Apps	Goals	Apps	Goals	Apps	Goals	Apps	Goals
Burnley	2010–11	0	0	0	0	1	0	0	0	1	0
Burnley	Total	0	0	0	0	1	0	0	0	1	0
Career totals		0	0	0	0	1	0	0	0	1	0

== Personal life ==
Following his stint at Geylang United, King went on to study at St Aidan's College, Durham University, going on to play for the University A-Team. He currently lives in Finsbury Park with long-term partner, Gemma Stanley.
