= Stefan Milojević (footballer, born February 1989) =

French-Serbian footballer

Personal information
- Full name: Stefan Milojević
- Date of birth: February 6, 1989 (age 37)
- Place of birth: SFR Yugoslavia
- Height: 1.80 m (5 ft 11 in)
- Position: Midfielder

Youth career
- 2000–2004: Solitaire Paris
- 2004–2007: AS Monaco
- 2007–2008: Birmingham City

Senior career*
Years	Team	Apps	(Gls)
2008–2009	Chênois		
2009–2011	ROS Menton		
2011–2012	Corte		
2012–2013	Geylang International	22	(2)
2014	Woodlands Wellington	10	(0)
- * Club domestic league appearances and goals

Stefan Milojević (born February 6, 1989) is a French-Serbian retired football player who last played for Woodlands Wellington as a midfielder.

Born in an area of former Yugoslavia (now Serbia), he was raised in southern France and spent most of his footballing career in France.

== Career ==
Milojević played for the youth teams of Solitaire Paris, AS Monaco and Birmingham City.

His senior career was spent with Swiss club CS Chênois, as well as French lower league clubs Rapid de Menton and USC Corte. Milojević signed with Singapore's Geylang International in June 2012. He played with the Eagles for two seasons, before joining Woodlands Wellington in 2014.
