= Shotaro Ihata =

Japanese footballer

Personal information
- Date of birth: February 12, 1987 (age 39)
- Place of birth: Shizuoka, Japan
- Height: 1.80 m (5 ft 11 in)
- Position: Forward

Youth career
- 2005–2008: Shizuoka Sangyo University

Senior career*
Years	Team	Apps	(Gls)
2009–2010	Roasso Kumamoto	29	(2)
2011	Albirex Niigata (S)	33	(22)
2012	Home United	22	(10)
2013	Geylang International	17	(1)
2014	Southern Myanmar	0	(0)
2015	Albirex Niigata (S)	20	(1)
Total		121	(36)
- * Club domestic league appearances and goals

Shotaro Ihata (井畑 翔太郎, Ihata Shotaro; born February 12, 1987) is a former Japanese football player.

== Club statistics ==
Club performance			League		Cup		League Cup		Total	
Season	Club	League	Apps	Goals	Apps	Goals	Apps	Goals	Apps	Goals
Japan			League		Emperor's Cup		League Cup		Total	
2009	Roasso Kumamoto	J2 League	13	0	0	0	-		13	0
2010	Roasso Kumamoto	J2 League					-			
Career total			13	0	0	0	0	0	13	0

== Honours ==
- S.League Goal of the Year: 2015
