= Martín Wagner =

Argentine footballer

Personal information
- Full name: Martín Wagner
- Date of birth: June 15, 1985 (age 41)
- Place of birth: Coronel Suárez, Argentina
- Height: 1.78 m (5 ft 10 in)
- Position: Defensive midfielder

Team information
- Current team: Estudiantes San Luis
- Number: 30

Senior career*
Years	Team	Apps	(Gls)
2004–2008	Olimpo	85	(0)
2008–2010	Racing Club	26	(0)
2011–2012	San Martín de San Juan	17	(0)
2012	Defensa y Justicia	3	(0)
2013	Tampines Rovers	10	(0)
2013–2014	Argentinos Juniors	0	(0)
2014–2015	Guaraní Antonio Franco	0	(0)
2015–	Estudiantes San Luis	9	(0)
- * Club domestic league appearances and goals as of 27 May 2015

Martín Wagner (born 15 June 1985 in Coronel Suárez) is an Argentine football midfielder who plays for Estudiantes San Luis.

== Career ==
Wagner began his professional playing career with Olimpo de Bahía Blanca in 2004 in the Primera División. He made his league debut in a 0–2 away win against Atlético Rafaela on 28 February 2004 aged 18. Wagner was part of the team that was relegated from the Primera División in 2006, but bounced straight back the following season by winning the Primera B Nacional Apertura and Clausura championships.

In 2008 Olimpo were relegated again, this time Wagner remained a Primera División player by joining Racing Club de Avellaneda. On 18 January 2013 Wagner signed for Tampines Rovers who play in the S.League. Manager Player Mister Marcos Garzia (Garziafutbol) Argentine.

== Titles ==
Season	Team	Title
Apertura 2006	Olimpo de Bahía Blanca	Primera B Nacional
Clausura 2007	Olimpo de Bahía Blanca	Primera B Nacional
