= Paul Cunningham (footballer) =

New Zealand footballer (born 1986)

Personal information
- Full name: Paul David Cunningham
- Date of birth: 18 June 1986 (age 40)
- Place of birth: New Zealand
- Height: 1.88 m (6 ft 2 in)
- Position: Defender

Team information
- Current team: Kaitake FC

Youth career
- 2004–2008: West Virginia Mountaineers

Senior career*
Years	Team	Apps	(Gls)
2008	Fisher Athletic		
2008–2009	Sorrento		
2010–2014	Balestier Khalsa	111	(15)
2015–2017	Team Taranaki		
2019–	Kaitake FC		
- * Club domestic league appearances and goals as of 10:52, 20 September 2019 (UTC)

Paul David Cunningham (born 18 June 1986) is a New Zealand former professional soccer player who plays for Kaitake FC as a defender.

== Career ==
=== West Virginia Mountaineers ===
Cunningham earned a soccer scholarship to West Virginia University, a Division I school in the Big East Conference, and played college soccer with the West Virginia Mountaineers, for 4 years.

=== Fisher Athletic ===
Following the completion of his studies, Cunningham played professionally in England for Fisher Athletic.

=== Sorrento ===
He later joined Australian side Sorrento, where he played for 8 months.

=== Balestier Khalsa ===
He moved to S.League club Balestier Khalsa for the 2010 season.

In 2011, Cunningham was named the Balestier captain and led them to a record finish in the 2013 S.League season. Cunningham was one of five players shortlisted for Player of the Season in 2013 and eventually lost out to Korean Marquee signing Lee Kwan Woo. Cunningham was also approached by Perth Glory FC to play for them that season but rejected after discussion with Balestier chairman, Thavaneson.

Cunningham has stated that he wants to play for Singapore at international level.

Following a contract dispute between Cunningham and Balestier at the end of the 2014 season, where Cunningham was only offered a 15-day extension to his contract allowing him to lead the Tigers out for the Singapore Cup final, the 5-year association between club and player ended on a sour note. Cunningham continued to train in the lead up to the final, which Balestier won, after he rejected the contract.

=== Team Taranaki ===
In 2015, Cunningham signed for Team Taranaki, an amateur association football club based in the Taranaki region, New Zealand. Despite interest from various overseas professional clubs, he and his wife Sarah made the decision to return to Taranaki as they look forward to settling back in New Zealand.

=== Later career ===
In September 2019 Cunningham was playing for Kaitake FC.

== Honours ==
Balestier Khalsa

- Singapore Cup: 2014
- League Cup: 2013
