= Jerome Baker (soccer) =

Canadian professional soccer player

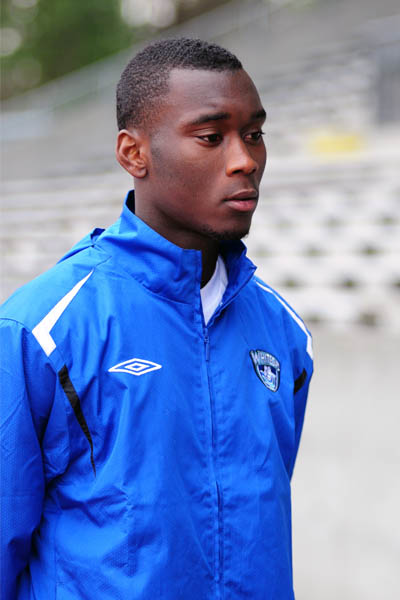

Personal information
- Date of birth: 8 September 1991 (age 35)
- Place of birth: Toronto, Ontario, Canada
- Position: Striker

Youth career
- Sigma FC
- –2010: Vancouver Whitecaps
- 2009–2010: → Energie Cottbus (loan)

Senior career*
Years	Team	Apps	(Gls)
2011–2013	FC Edmonton	0	(0)
2013–2014	Hougang United	19	(2)
2014–2015	Bangkok Glass B		
Total		19+	(2+)
- * Club domestic league appearances and goals

Jerome Baker (born 8 September 1991) is a Canadian former professional soccer player who played as a striker.
