= 2010–11 Kitchee SC season =

Kitchee SC
2010–11 season
- General Manager: Ken Ng
- Head Coach: Josep Gombau
- League: 1st
- Senior Shield: Quarter-finals
- FA Cup: First round
- League Cup: Semi-finals
- Singapore Cup: Quarter-finals
Home colours	Away colours

The 2010–11 season is the 32nd season of Kitchee SC in Hong Kong First Division League. The team is coached by Spain coach Josep Gombau.

== Squad statistics ==
No.	Pos.	Name	League		Senior Shield		FA Cup		League Cup		Singapore Cup		Total	
No.	Pos.	Name	Apps	Goals	Apps	Goals	Apps	Goals	Apps	Goals	Apps	Goals	Apps	Goals
1	GK	(China) Wang Zhenpeng	3	0	0	0	0	0	0	0	1	0	4	0
3	DF	(Spain) Dani Cancela	3	0	0	0	0	0	0	0	1	0	4	0
4	DF	(Spain) Fernando Recio	2 (1)	0	0	0	0	0	0	0	1	0	3 (1)	0
5	DF	(Spain) Ubay Luzardo	2 (1)	0	0	0	0	0	0	0	1	0	3 (1)	0
6	MF	(Hong Kong) Gao Wen	3	0	0	0	0	0	0	0	1	0	4	0
7	MF	(Hong Kong) Chu Siu Kei	2 (1)	0	0	0	0	0	0	0	1	0	3 (1)	0
8	MF	(Hong Kong) So Loi Keung	2 (1)	2	0	0	0	0	0	0	1	0	3 (1)	2
9	MF	(China) Liang Zicheng	1	0	0	0	0	0	0	0	1	0	2	0
10	MF	(Hong Kong) Lam Ka Wai	2	0	0	0	0	0	0	0	0 (1)	0	2 (1)	0
11	MF	(Hong Kong) Tsang Chi Hau	0	0	0	0	0	0	0	0	0	0	0	0
12	MF	(Hong Kong) Lo Kwan Yee	3	0	0	0	0	0	0	0	1	0	4	0
13	MF	(Hong Kong) Chan Man Fai	1 (1)	0	0	0	0	0	0	0	0 (1)	0	1 (2)	0
14	DF	(Hong Kong) Liu Quankun	2 (1)	0	0	0	0	0	0	0	1	0	3 (1)	0
17	GK	(Hong Kong) Li Jian	0	0	0	0	0	0	0	0	0	0	0	0
18	MF	(Spain) Jordi Tarrés	2 (1)	3	0	0	0	0	0	0	1	0	3 (1)	3
19	FW	(Hong Kong) Cheng Siu Wai	2 (1)	0	0	0	0	0	0	0	0 (1)	0	2 (2)	0
20	FW	(Spain) Roberto Losada	3	2	0	0	0	0	0	0	0	0	3	2
21	DF	(Hong Kong) Tsang Kam To	0 (1)	0	0	0	0	0	0	0	0	0	0 (1)	0
28	MF	(Hong Kong) Li Ka Chun	0	0	0	0	0	0	0	0	0	0	0	0

Statistics accurate as of match played 16 September 2010

== Matches ==
=== Competitive ===
==== Hong Kong First Division League ====
5 September 2010 Week 1	TSW Pegasus	0–0	Kitchee	Yuen Long Stadium
20:00 GMT+8	Lee Wai Lun (yellow card) 36'	Report	(yellow card) 26' Gao Wen; (yellow card) 90' Liu Quankun	Attendance: 1,397; Referee: Pau Sai Yin

16 September 2010 Week 3	Kitchee	3–1	Citizen	Tseung Kwan O Sports Ground
20:00 GMT+8	Roberto 2'; Chu Siu Kei (yellow card) 45'; Roberto 55'; Jordi 90'	Report	14' Hélio; (yellow card) 38' Law Chun Bong; (yellow card) 86' Ma Ka Ki; (yellow card) 90' Ju Yingzhi	Attendance: 979; Referee: Ng Chiu Kok

23 September 2010 Week 4	Kitchee	6–0	HKFC	Tseung Kwan O Sports Ground
15:00 GMT+8	So Loi Keung 10'; J. Sealy 40' (o.g.); Luzardo (yellow card) 47'; Lo Kwan Yee 56'; Jordi 69'; So Loi Keung 74'; Jordi 90'	Report	Sandor (yellow card) 77'	Attendance: 608; Referee: Ng Kai Lam

16 October 2010 Week 5	NT Realty Wofoo Tai Po	v	Kitchee	Tai Po Sports Ground
15:00 GMT+8

==== Hong Kong Senior Challenge Shield ====
31 October 2010 Quarter-final	Kitchee	v	Fourway Rangers	Yuen Long Stadium
14:00 GMT+8

==== Singapore Cup ====
===== Quarter-final =====
28 September 2010 First leg	Etoile (France)	2–0	(Hong Kong) Kitchee	Singapore
19:45 GMT+8	Leclercq (yellow card) 20'; Delétraz 31'; Yann (yellow card) 33'; Damiani (yellow card) 45'; Verschave (yellow card) 61'; Boudjema 73'; Bagnost (yellow card) 90'	Report	(yellow card) 46' So Loi Keung; (yellow card) 48' Lam Ka Wai; (yellow card) 84' Luzardo; (yellow card) 84' Recio	Stadium: Queenstown Stadium; Attendance: 721; Referee: Sukhbir Singh (Singapore)

1 October 2010 Second leg	Kitchee (Hong Kong)	4–4	(France) Etoile	Singapore
19:30 GMT+8	Lo Kwan Yee (yellow card) 10'; Luzardo 16' (pen.); Lakehal 45' (o.g.); Liang Zicheng 57'; Liu Quankun (yellow card) 61'; Morandini 71' (o.g.); Dani (yellow card) 72'; Lam Ka Wai (yellow card) 88'; Tsang Kam To (yellow card) 90'; Tsang Kam To (yellow card) 90' (yellow-red card)	Report	2' Lakehal; (yellow card) 14' Damiani; (yellow card) 44' Michelini; 63' Mendy; 72' Souchon; 77' Moulin; (yellow card) 90' Boudjema	Stadium: Jalan Besar Stadium; Attendance: 989; Referee: Zaid Hussein (Singapore)
