= 2010 Singapore League Cup =

Tournament details
- Country: Singapore
- Teams: 12

Final positions
- Champions: Étoile
- Runners-up: Woodlands Wellington
- Third place: Sengkang Punggol

The 2010 Singapore League Cup was held between 20 February to 7 March. The draw was held on Tuesday, 9 February 2010 in Singapore. The matches are played on a one match basis.

The cup was won by debutant football club Étoile FC.

== Bracket ==
Preliminary stage
1	Home United
16	--bye--
9	Gombak United
8	--bye--
5	Tampines Rovers
12	--bye--
13	Woodlands Wellington	0 (4)
4	(Japan) Albirex Niigata (S)	0 (3)
3	Geylang United	0 (4)
14	(Singapore) Young Lions	0 (2)
11	Balestier Khalsa	0
6	(France) Etoile FC	2
7	SAFFC
10	--bye--
15	(China) Beijing Guoan (S)	1
2	Sengkang Punggol	3

Quarter-Finals
Home United	0
Gombak United	1
Tampines Rovers	0
Woodlands Wellington	1
Geylang United	2
(France) Etoile FC	3
SAFFC	1
Sengkang Punggol	3

Semi-Finals
Gombak United	2 (3)
Woodlands Wellington	2 (4)
(France) Etoile FC	1
Sengkang Punggol	0

Final
Woodlands Wellington	1
(France) Etoile FC	3
Third place
Gombak United	1
Sengkang Punggol	2

== Preliminary stage ==
The winners advance to the quarter-final stage.

20 February 2010
19:45

Geylang United	0 – 0 (aet)	(Singapore) Young Lions
	Report
Penalties
Peter Tomko (penalty scored); Miroslav Latiak (penalty scored); Jonathan Xu (penalty scored); Itimi Dickson (penalty scored)	4 – 2	(penalty missed) Luka Savic; (penalty scored) Izzdin Shafiq; (penalty scored) Raihan Abdul Rahman; (penalty missed) Fadhil Noh

Bedok Stadium
Attendance: 792
Referee: Adzhar Adziz

21 February 2010
19:45

Balestier Khalsa	0 – 2	(France) Etoile FC
	Report	Khaled Kharroubi 34'; Karim Boudjema 90'

Toa Payoh Stadium
Attendance: 951
Referee: K Kalimuthu

22 February 2010
19:45

Woodlands Wellington	0 – 0 (aet)	(Japan) Albirex Niigata (S)
	Report
Penalties
Kazuki Yoshino (penalty scored); Abdelhadi Laakkad (penalty scored); Asraf Rashid (penalty scored); Luis Eduardo Hicks (penalty scored)	4 – 3	(penalty missed) Satoshi Hida; (penalty scored) Mitsuki Ichihara; (penalty scored) Keisuke Matsui; (penalty scored) Kazuki Kobayashi; (penalty missed) Akiya Wada

Woodlands Stadium
Attendance: 1,328
Referee: Abas Daud

23 February 2010
19:45

Beijing Guoan (S) (China)	1 – 3 (aet)	Sengkang Punggol
Zhang Ye 46'	Report	Mamadou Diallo 90' 104'; Farizal Basri 119'

Yishun Stadium
Attendance: 792
Referee: Muhd Taqi

== Quarter-final stage ==
The winners advance to the semi-final stage.

25 February 2010
19:45

Home United	0 - 1	Gombak United
	Report	Obadin Aikhena (Pen) 90'

Clementi Stadium
Attendance: 1,329
Referee: P Pandian

26 February 2010
19:30

Tampines Rovers	0 – 1	Woodlands Wellington
	Report	Noor Ali 63'

Tampines Stadium
Attendance: 1,341
Referee: Sukhbir Singh

28 February 2010
19:45

Geylang United	2 – 3	(France) Etoile FC
Fazly Hasan 31'; Vasile Ghindaru 41'	Report	Matthias Verschave (pen) 45'; Frederic Mendy 72'; Karim Boudjema 76'

Bedok Stadium
Attendance: 1,057
Referee: Abas Daud

1 March 2010
19:45

SAFFC	1 – 3	Sengkang Punggol
Ivan Lovric 59'	Report	Mamadou Diallo 5'; Murphy Wiredu 25'; Jalal 67'

Choa Chu Kang Stadium
Attendance: 1,802
Referee: Leow Thiam Hoe

== Semi-final stage ==
The winners advance to the Final, while the losers contest for 3rd-place.

3 March 2010
19:30

Gombak United	2 – 2 (aet)	Woodlands Wellington
Jeremy Chiang 19'; Park Kang Jin 120'	Report	Rizawan Abdullah 50'; Navin Vanu 114'
Penalties
Park Kang Jin (penalty scored); Jaslee Hatta (penalty missed); Ridhwan Jamaludin (penalty missed); Goran Subara (penalty scored); Obadin Aikhena (penalty scored)	3 – 4	(penalty scored) Kazuki Yoshino; (penalty scored) Asraf Rashid; (penalty scored) Abdelhadi Laakkad; (penalty missed) Winston Yap; (penalty scored) Azlan Alipah

Jalan Besar Stadium
Attendance: 1,550
Referee: Abas Daud

4 March 2010
19:30

Etoile FC (France)	1 – 0	Sengkang Punggol
Anthony Moulin 51'	Report

Jalan Besar Stadium
Attendance: 1,708
Referee: K Kalimuthu

== 3rd-place playoff ==
7 March 2010
16:45

Gombak United	1 - 2	Sengkang Punggol
Fazrul Nawaz 16'	Report	Mamadou Diallo 36'; Abdoulaye Diallo 78'

Jalan Besar Stadium
Attendance: 1,279
Referee: Sukhbir Singh

== Final ==
7 March 2010
19:30

Woodlands Wellington	1 - 3	(France) Etoile FC
Abdelhadi Laakkad 45'	Report	Matthias Verschave 50', 84'; Leeroy Anton 90'

Jalan Besar Stadium
Attendance: 2,814
Referee: P Pandian

== See also ==
- S.League
- Singapore Cup
- Singapore Charity Shield
- Football Association of Singapore
- List of football clubs in Singapore
