= 2010 S.League =

S. League
- Season: 2010
- Champions: Étoile; 1st S.League title
- AFC Cup: Tampines Rovers (S.League runners-up)
- Matches: 198
- Goals: 464 (2.34 per match)
- Top goalscorer: (France) Frédéric Mendy (21)
- Biggest home win: Tampines Rovers 5–0 Woodlands Wellington (21 June 2010); Gombak United 5–0 Woodlands Wellington (1 July 2010)
- Biggest away win: Woodlands Wellington 0–4 Singapore Armed Forces (7 July 2010)

The 2010 S.League (officially known as the Great-Eastern-Yeo's S-League for sponsorship reasons) was the 15th season since the establishment of the S-League. The season began on 1 February 2010, and ended on 12 November 2010.

Winners Etoile FC were ineligible to represent Singapore in AFC competitions as they were a foreign team. Tampines Rovers qualified as the runner-up for the 2011 AFC Cup.

== Changes from last season ==
Changes to the league include:

- Etoile FC and Beijing Guoan Talent have replaced DPMM FC and Super Reds FC in the 2010 season.

== Teams ==
Location of teams in 2010 S.League

== List of foreign players ==
Each club is allowed to have up to a maximum of 4 foreign players.

| Club | Player 1 | Player 2 | Player 3 | Player 4 | Prime League | Former Player |
|---|---|---|---|---|---|---|
| Balestier Khalsa | (New Zealand) Paul Cunningham | (England) Daniel Hammond | (Brazil) Rivaldo Costa | (Brazil) Vitor Borges | (Hong Kong) (Chinese Taipei) Li Huai Min | None |
| Geylang United | (South Korea) Kim Jae-hong | (Romania) Vasile Ghindaru | (Slovakia) Rastislav Belicak | (Slovakia) Peter Tomko | None | (Slovakia) Miroslav Latiak |
| Gombak United | (South Korea) Park Kang-jin | (South Korea) Jang Jo-yoon | (Australia) Goran Subara | (Nigeria) Obadin Aikhena | (Nigeria) Pascal Eddoh | None |
| Home United | (South Korea) Choi Chul-woo | (South Korea) Chun Jae-woon | (South Korea) Ahn Hyo-yeon | (Cameroon) Valery Hiek | (Canada) Sherif El-Masri | (Chile) Nelson San Martin |
| SAFFC | (South Korea) Park Tae-won | (Croatia) Ivan Lovric | (Croatia) Ivan Jerkovic | (Uruguay) Federico Martinez | (Japan) Taisuke Akiyoshi | (Sweden) Niklas Sandberg |
| Sengkang Punggol | (Japan) Kenji Arai | (South Korea) An Jae-cheul | (Iran) Tehranizadeh | (Guinea) Mamadou M. Diallo | (Canada) Jordan Webb | (Canada) Ryan Fante (Canada) Murphy Wiredu (Guinea) Abdoulaye Diallo (Guinea) Moussa Keita |
| Tampines Rovers | (Japan) Seiji Kaneko | (Japan) Akihiro Nakamura | (South Korea) Park Yo-seb | (France) Benoit Croissant | None | None |
| Woodlands Wellington | (Japan) Kazuki Yoshino | (Morocco) Abdelhadi Laakkad | (Morocco) Rachid Lajane | (Chile) Luis Eduardo Hicks | (Colombia) Camilo Buitrago | None |
| Young Lions | (South Korea) Kim Seong-kyu | (South Korea) Seo Su-jong | (Serbia) Luka Savic | None | None | None |

- Albirex Niigata (S), Beijing Guoan Talent and Etoile FC are not allowed to hire any foreigners.

== League table ==
| Pos | Team | Pld | W | D | L | GF | GA | GD | Pts | Qualification |
|---|---|---|---|---|---|---|---|---|---|---|
| 1 | Étoile FC | 33 | 21 | 7 | 5 | 54 | 23 | +31 | 70 | |
| 2 | Tampines Rovers | 33 | 21 | 6 | 6 | 68 | 30 | +38 | 69 | Qualification to AFC Cup Group Stage (Note: The three foreign clubs – Albirex Niigata (S), Beijing Guoan Talent and Étoile – as well as the Football Association of Singapore under-23 team, Young Lions, were not eligible for qualification to continental competitions. The FAS withdrew their one allocated AFC Champions League qualifying round spot. Tampines Rovers qualified for the 2011 AFC Cup as league runners-up.) |
| 3 | Home United | 33 | 18 | 11 | 4 | 55 | 31 | +24 | 65 | |
| 4 | Singapore Armed Forces | 33 | 16 | 5 | 12 | 56 | 41 | +15 | 53 | |
| 5 | Geylang United | 33 | 12 | 11 | 10 | 32 | 30 | +2 | 47 | |
| 6 | Gombak United | 33 | 12 | 10 | 11 | 33 | 25 | +8 | 46 | |
| 7 | Albirex Niigata (S) | 33 | 9 | 10 | 14 | 31 | 42 | −11 | 37 | |
| 8 | Balestier Khalsa | 33 | 10 | 7 | 16 | 26 | 40 | −14 | 37 | |
| 9 | Young Lions | 33 | 9 | 12 | 12 | 37 | 45 | −8 | 34 (Note: Beijing Guoan Talent and Young Lions were deducted five points each for gross misconduct in their match on 7 September 2010.) | |
| 10 | Beijing Guoan Talent | 33 | 10 | 6 | 17 | 30 | 49 | −19 | 31 | |
| 11 | Sengkang Punggol | 33 | 7 | 6 | 20 | 24 | 48 | −24 | 27 | |
| 12 | Woodlands Wellington | 33 | 4 | 7 | 22 | 18 | 60 | −42 | 19 | |

Source: RSSSF
Rules for classification: 1) points; 2) goal difference; 3) number of goals scored; 4) number of wins

== Top scorers ==
| Rank | Scorer | Club | Goals |
|---|---|---|---|
| 1 | (France) Frédéric Mendy | Étoile | 21 |
| 2 | (Singapore) Aleksandar Duric | Tampines Rovers | 20 |
| 3 | (Singapore) Shahril Ishak | Home United | 17 |
| 4 | (Singapore) Qiu Li | Tampines Rovers | 15 |
| 5 | (Slovakia) Peter Tomko | Geylang United | 12 |
| 6 | (Brazil) Rivaldo Costa | Balestier Khalsa | 11 |
| 6 | (Singapore) Shi Jiayi | Home United | 11 |
| 8 | (Singapore) Indra Sahdan | Singapore Armed Forces | 10 |
| 8 | (France) Matthias Verschave | Étoile | 10 |
| 8 | (South Korea) Park Tae-Won | Singapore Armed Forces | 10 |

== Results ==
Fixtures and Results of the S. League 2010 season.

Note: The results are broken down into weeks rather than rounds, as some teams may play 2 or more games a week due to the nature of the league system (games are played every day). Hence, sometimes, teams may not play in the league some weeks due to other competition commitments or re-arranged games.

=== Week 1 ===
The opening week of the season runs from Monday 1 February to Friday 5 February. Official Site Weekly Review

| 1 February 2010 | Young Lions | 2–2 | Woodlands Wellington | Jalan Besar Stadium |
| 19:45 | Khairul Nizam 81'; Afiq Yunos 90' | Preview; Details; Report | Winston Yap 7'; Abdelhadi Laakkad 21' | Attendance: 2,471; Referee: Leow Thiam Hoe |

| 2 February 2010 | Sengkang Punggol | 1–2 | Balestier Khalsa | Hougang Stadium |
| 19:45 | Jordan Webb 44' | Preview; Details; Report | Rivaldo Costa 18' 23' (pen.) | Attendance: 2,020; Referee: Abas Daud |

| 3 February 2010 | SAFFC | 1–1 | Geylang United | Choa Chu Kang Stadium |
| 19:45 | Indra Sahdan Daud 59' (pen.) | Preview; Details; Report | Syed Fadhil 44' | Attendance: 3,323; Referee: Abdul Malik Bashir |

| 4 February 2010 | Albirex Niigata (S) | 1–2 | Home United | Jurong East Stadium |
| 19:45 | Ken Matsumoto 83' | Preview; Details; Report | Juma'at Jantan 69'; Shahril Ishak 85' | Attendance: 1,412; Referee: W Ravisanthiran |

| 5 February 2010 | Gombak United | 0–1 | Tampines Rovers | Jurong West Stadium |
| 19:45 | | Preview; Details; Report | Qiu Li 9' | Attendance: 2,401; Referee: K Kalimuthu |

=== Week 2 ===
The 2nd week of the season runs from Monday 8 February to Friday 12 February. Official Site Weekly Review

| 8 February 2010 | Balestier Khalsa | 1–2 | Gombak United | Toa Payoh Stadium |
| 19:45 | Rivaldo Costa 66' | Preview; Details; Report | Park Kang Jin 60'; Bah Mamadou 70' | Attendance: 2,189; Referee: Sukhbir Singh |

| 9 February 2010 | Home United | 2–2 | Young Lions | Clementi Stadium |
| 19:45 | Shahril Ishak 1'; Valery Hiek 90' | Preview; Details; Report | Fazli Ayob 37'; Luka Savic 39' (pen.) | Attendance: 2,538; Referee: Zaid Hussein |

| 10 February 2010 | Geylang United | 1–1 | Albirex Niigata (S) | Bedok Stadium |
| 19:45 | Syed Thaha 79' | Preview; Details; Report | Satoshi Hida 70' | Attendance: 2,439; Referee: Johan Jahari |

| 11 February 2010 | Sengkang Punggol | 2–1 | Gombak United | Hougang Stadium |
| 19:45 | Obadin Aikhena 64' (o.g.); Jordan Webb 79' | Preview; Details; Report | Obadin Aikhena 89' | Attendance: 1,817; Referee: Leow Thiam Hoe |

| 11 February 2010 | SAFFC | 2–1 | Balestier Khalsa | Choa Chu Kang Stadium |
| 19:45 | Indra Sahdan Daud 59'; Park Tae Won 82' | Preview; Details; Report | Hafiz Osman 31' (o.g.) | Attendance: 1,570; Referee: Muhd Taqi |

| 12 February 2010 | Beijing Guoan Talent | 0–1 | Etoile FC | Jalan Besar Stadium |
| 19:30 | | Preview; Details; Report | Flavien Michelini 85' | Attendance: 2,309; Referee: Abdul Malik |

=== Week 3 ===
The 3rd week of the season runs from Tuesday 16 February to Friday 19 February. Official Site Weekly Review

| 16 February 2010 | Young Lions | 0–1 | Geylang United | Jalan Besar Stadium |
| 19:45 | | Preview; Details; Report | Peter Tomko 19' | Attendance: 2,489; Referee: Muhd Taqi |

| 16 February 2010 | Albirex Niigata (S) | 1–3 | Tampines Rovers | Jurong East Stadium |
| 19:45 | Nobuhiro Uetani 68' | Preview; Details; Report | Park Yo Seb 20'; Jamil Ali 56'; Qiu Li 84' (pen.) | Attendance: 2,114; Referee: Sukhbir Singh |

| 17 February 2010 | Etoile FC | 2–2 | Sengkang Punggol | Jalan Besar Stadium |
| 19:30 | Frederic Mendy 58'; Matthias Verschave 90' | Preview; Details; Report | Moussa Keita 36'; Jordan Webb 78' | Attendance: 1,991; Referee: Abas Daud |

| 18 February 2010 | Woodlands Wellington | 0–0 | Beijing Guoan Talent | Woodlands Stadium |
| 19:45 | | Preview; Details; Report | | Attendance: 1,420; Referee: W Ravisanthiran |

| 19 February 2010 | Tampines Rovers | 1–1 | SAFFC | Jalan Besar Stadium |
| 19:30 | Qiu Li 90' (pen.) | Preview; Details; Report | Park Tae Won 90' | Attendance: 2,763; Referee: Abdul Malik |

=== Week 4 ===
The 4th week of the season runs from Monday 8 March to Friday 12 March. Official Site Weekly Review

| 8 March 2010 | Balestier Khalsa | 1–0 | Albirex Niigata (S) | Toa Payoh Stadium |
| 19:45 | Anantha Rajan 21' | Preview; Details; Report | | Attendance: 1,303; Referee: Zaid Hussein |

| 9 March 2010 | Tampines Rovers | 3–0 | Young Lions | Tampines Stadium |
| 19:45 | Qiu Li 42'; Aleksandar Duric 78' 90' | Preview; Details; Report | | Attendance: 1,540; Referee: Abas Daud |

| 11 March 2010 | Etoile FC | 4–0 | Woodlands Wellington | Queenstown Stadium |
| 19:45 | Julien Deletraz 9'; Cyril Bagnost 14'; Frederic Mendy 21' 51' | Preview; Details; Report | | Attendance: 3,206; Referee: Sukhbir Singh |

| 12 March 2010 | Geylang United | 1–3 | Beijing Guoan Talent | Jalan Besar Stadium |
| 19:30 | Peter Tomko 71' | Preview; Details; Report | Tan Tiancheng 29' 52'; Zhang Xizhe 90' | Attendance: 1,350; Referee: P Pandian |

=== Week 5 ===
The 5th week of the season runs from Sunday 14 March to Friday 19 March. Official Site Weekly Review

14 March 2010
19:45

| Home United | 3–3 | Etoile FC |
|---|---|---|
| Choi Chul Woo 43'; Sherif El-Masri 68'; Zulfadli Zainal Abidin 81' | Preview; Details; Report | Frederic Mendy 2'; Matthias Verschave 37'; Karim Boudjema 45' |

Clementi Stadium
Attendance: 1,728
Referee: Abdul Malik
15 March 2010
19:45

| Sengkang Punggol | 1–3 | SAFFC |
|---|---|---|
| Daniel Bennett 12' (o.g.) | Preview; Details; Report | Indra Sahdan Daud 4'; Taisuke Akiyoshi 28' 71' |

Hougang Stadium
Attendance: 1,879
Referee: W Ravisanthiran
15 March 2010
19:45

| Albirex Niigata (S) | 0–0 | Gombak United |
|---|---|---|
| | Preview; Details; Report |

Jurong East Stadium
Attendance: 1,579
Referee: Adzhar Adziz
16 March 2010
19:45

| Beijing Guoan Talent | 1–2 | Tampines Rovers |
|---|---|---|
| Tan Tiancheng 8' | Preview; Details; Report | Qiu Li 61'; Khairul Amri 67' |

Yishun Stadium
Attendance: 1,105
Referee: Sukhbir Singh
17 March 2010
19:30

| Young Lions | 3–0 | Balestier Khalsa |
|---|---|---|
| Safuwan Baharudin 1'; Izzdin Shafiq 20' (pen.); Seo Su Jong 76' | Preview; Details; Report |

Jalan Besar Stadium
Attendance: 1,604
Referee: Johan Jahari
18 March 2010
19:45

| Gombak United | 1–0 | SAFFC |
|---|---|---|
| Goran Subara 40' | Preview; Details; Report |

Jurong West Stadium
Attendance: 2,198
Referee: Muhd Taqi
18 March 2010
19:45

| Woodlands Wellington | 0–1 | Sengkang Punggol |
|---|---|---|
| | Preview; Details; Report | Jordan Webb 5' |

Woodlands Stadium
Attendance: 1,392
Referee: P Pandian
19 March 2010
19:30

| Beijing Guoan Talent | 4–1 | Home United |
|---|---|---|
| Tengku Mushadad 43' (o.g.); Liu Teng 71'; Zhang Xizhe 89'; Wang Hao 90' | Preview; Details; Report | Shi Jiayi 16' |

Jalan Besar Stadium
Attendance: 1,924
Referee: K Kalimuthu

=== Week 6 ===
The 6th week of the season runs from Monday 22 March to Saturday 27 March. Official Site Weekly Review

22 March 2010
19:45

| Tampines Rovers | 1–1 | Etoile FC |
|---|---|---|
| Qiu Li 23' | Preview; Details; Report | Flavien Michelini 86' |

Tampines Stadium
Attendance: 2,444
Referee: P Pandian
22 March 2010
19:45

| Woodlands Wellington | 2–2 | Home United |
|---|---|---|
| Abdelhadi Laakkad 73'; Kazuki Yoshino 89' | Preview; Details; Report | Nelson San Martin 16'; Choi Chul Woo 48' |

Woodlands Stadium
Attendance: 1,941
Referee: Abdul Malik
24 March 2010
19:30

| Balestier Khalsa | 1–0 | Beijing Guoan Talent |
|---|---|---|
| Rivaldo Costa 24' | Preview; Details; Report |

Toa Payoh Stadium
Attendance: 1,668
Referee: Leow Thiam Hoe
25 March 2010
19:45

| Gombak United | 2–0 | Young Lions |
|---|---|---|
| Chang Jo Yoon 74'; Fazrul Nawaz 74' | Preview; Details; Report |

Jurong West Stadium
Attendance: 2,102
Referee: W Ravisanthiran
26 March 2010
19:30

| Home United | 2–1 | Sengkang Punggol |
|---|---|---|
| Choi Chul Woo 39'; Valery Hiek 78' | Preview; Details; Report | Farizal Basri 79' |

Jalan Besar Stadium
Attendance: 2,326
Referee: Muhd Taqi
27 March 2010
19:45

| SAFFC | 3–0 | Albirex Niigata |
|---|---|---|
| Indra Sahdan Daud 25' 50'; Niklas Sandberg 62' | Preview; Details; Report |

Choa Chu Kang Stadium
Attendance: 1,615
Referee: Johan Jahari

=== Week 7 ===
The 7th week of the season runs from Monday 29 March to Friday 2 April. Official Site Weekly Review

29 March 2010
19:45

| Etoile FC | 2–2 | Geylang United |
|---|---|---|
| Karim Boudjema 28'; Matthias Verschave 58' (pen.) | Preview; Details; Report | Walid Lounis 12'; Peter Tomko 85' |

Queenstown Stadium
Attendance: 2,707
Referee: Sukhbir Singh
30 March 2010
19:45

| Beijing Guoan Talent | 1–0 | Gombak United |
|---|---|---|
| Wang Hao 50' | Preview; Details; Report |

Yishun Stadium
Attendance: 971
Referee: Abas Daud
31 March 2010
19:30

| Woodlands Wellington | 0–4 | Tampines Rovers |
|---|---|---|
| | Preview; Details; Report | Aleksandar Duric 11'; Qiu Li 56'; Khairul Amri 76', 88' |

Jalan Besar Stadium
Attendance: 1,317
Referee: Zaid Hussein
1 April 2010
19:45

| Sengkang Punggol | 0–1 | Albirex Niigata |
|---|---|---|
| | Preview; Details; Report | Fumiya Kobayashi 65' |

Hougang Stadium
Attendance: 1,449
Referee: Sukhbir Singh
1 April 2010
19:45

| Home United | 3–0 | Geylang United |
|---|---|---|
| Shi Jiayi 7'; Choi Chul Woo 33'; Shahril Ishak 83' | Preview; Details; Report |

Clementi Stadium
Attendance: 1,032
Referee: Leow Thiam Hoe
2 April 2010
19:30

| Etoile FC | 1–0 | Balestier Khalsa |
|---|---|---|
| Frederic Mendy 83' | Preview; Details; Report |

Jalan Besar Stadium
Attendance: 2,158
Referee: W Ravisanthiran

=== Week 8 ===
The 8th week of the season runs from Monday 5 April to Saturday 10 April. Official Site Weekly Review

5 April 2010
19:45

| Balestier Khalsa | 0–1 | Woodlands Wellington |
|---|---|---|
| | Preview; Details; Report | Abdelhadi Laakkad 34' |

Toa Payoh Stadium
Attendance: 994
Referee: Abas Daud
7 April 2010
19:30

| Gombak United | 1–0 | Etoile FC |
|---|---|---|
| Obadin Aikhena 48' | Preview; Details; Report |

Jurong West Stadium
Attendance: 2,241
Referee: K Kalimuthu
8 April 2010
19:45

| Young Lions | 4–3 | SAFFC |
|---|---|---|
| Nazrul Ahmad Nazari 14'; Seo Su Jong 52'; Luka Savic 56'; Khairul Nizam 64' | Preview; Details; Report | Ahmad Latiff 24'; Ivan Lovric 29'; Park Tae Won 42' |

Jalan Besar Stadium
Attendance: 1,601
Referee: P Pandian
9 April 2010
19:30

| Tampines Rovers | 0–0 | Home United |
|---|---|---|
| | Preview; Details; Report |

Jalan Besar Stadium
Attendance: 2,468
Referee: Abdul Malik
10 April 2010
19:45

| Geylang United | 1–0 | Woodlands Wellington |
|---|---|---|
| Hafiz Rahim 45' | Preview; Details; Report |

Bedok Stadium
Attendance: 1,408
Referee: Muhd Taqi

=== Week 9 ===
The 9th week of the season runs from Monday 12 April to Friday 16 April. Official Site Weekly Review

12 April 2010
19:45

| Albirex Niigata | 1–2 | Young Lions |
|---|---|---|
| Atsushi Shimono 4' | Preview; Details; Report | Fazli Ayob 54'; Khairul Nizam 80' |

Jurong East Stadium
Attendance: 1,542
Referee: K Kalimuthu
14 April 2010
19:45

| Home United | 2–2 | Balestier Khalsa |
|---|---|---|
| Shi Jiayi 18'; Azhar Sairudin 33' | Preview; Details; Report | Vitor Borges 30'; Rivaldo Costa 34' |

Clementi Stadium
Attendance: 1,206
Referee: Zaid Hussein
15 April 2010
19:45

| Beijing Guoan Talent | 0–2 | Albirex Niigata |
|---|---|---|
| | Preview; Details; Report | Fumiya Kobayashi 22'; Satoshi Hida 24' |

Yishun Stadium
Attendance: 894
Referee: Leow Thiam Hoe
15 April 2010
19:45

| Geylang United | 3–2 | Sengkang Punggol |
|---|---|---|
| Peter Tomko 53', 58', 78' | Preview; Details; Report | Sobrie Mazelan 29'; Murphy Wiredu 55' |

Bedok Stadium
Attendance: 1,004
Referee: Johan Jahari
16 April 2010
19:30

| Woodlands Wellington | 2–1 | Gombak United |
|---|---|---|
| Abdelhadi Laakkad 26'; Noor Ali 32' | Preview; Details; Report | Fazli Jaffar 12' |

Jalan Besar Stadium
Attendance: 1,310
Referee: K Kalimuthu

=== Week 10 ===
The 10th week of the season runs from Monday 19 April to Saturday 24 April. Official Site Weekly Review

19 April 2010
19:45

| Young Lions | 0–1 | Sengkang Punngol |
|---|---|---|
| | Preview; Details; Report | Murphy Wiredu 65' |

Jalan Besar Stadium
Attendance: 1,546
Referee: W Ravisanthiran
19 April 2010
19:45

| SAFFC | 3–0 | Beijing Guoan Talent |
|---|---|---|
| Ivan Lovric 29'; Indra Sahdan Daud 45'; Daniel Bennett 66' | Preview; Details; Report |

Choa Chu Kang Stadium
Attendance: 1,377
Referee: Sukhbir Singh
20 April 2010
19:45

| Albirex Niigata | 0–0 | Etoile FC |
|---|---|---|
| | Preview; Details; Report |

Jurong East Stadium
Attendance: 1,643
Referee: Abdul Malik
21 April 2010
19:30

| Gombak United | 1–0 | Home United |
|---|---|---|
| Fazrul Nawaz 50' | Preview; Details; Report |

Jalan Besar Stadium
Attendance: 1,879
Referee: Muhd Taqi
22 April 2010
19:45

| Young Lions | 0–0 | Beijing Guoan Talent |
|---|---|---|
| | Preview; Details; Report |

Jalan Besar Stadium
Attendance: 1,547
Referee: Pandian
22 April 2010
19:45

| Balestier Khalsa | 1–0 | Sengkang Punngol |
|---|---|---|
| K Vikraman 41' | Preview; Details; Report |

Toa Payoh Stadium
Attendance: 845
Referee: Adzhar Adziz
23 April 2010
19:30

| Etoile FC | 3–0 | SAFFC |
|---|---|---|
| Cyril Bagnost 14'; Kevin Yann 70'; Frederic Mendy 14' | Preview; Details; Report |

Jalan Besar Stadium
Attendance: 2,526
Referee: Abas Daud
24 April 2010
19:45

| Tampines Rovers | 0–1 | Geylang United |
|---|---|---|
| | Preview; Details; Report | Masrezwan Masturi 78' |

Tampines Stadium
Attendance: 1,536
Referee: Abdul Malik

=== Week 11 ===
The 11th week of the season runs from Monday 26 April to Friday 30 April. Official Site Weekly Review

26 April 2010
19:45

| Woodlands Wellington | 1–2 | Albirex Niigata |
|---|---|---|
| Abdelhadi Laakkad 41' | Preview; Details; Report | Shota Matsuoka 81'; Tatsuro Inui 83' |

Woodlands Stadium
Attendance: 1,235
Referee: Abas Daud
28 April 2010
19:30

| Sengkang Punggol | 0–3 | Tampines Rovers |
|---|---|---|
| | Preview; Details; Report | Khairul Amri 54'; Qiu Li 61' 69' |

Hougang Stadium
Attendance: 1,599
Referee: Leow Thiam Hoe
29 April 2010
19:45

| Etoile FC | 2–0 | Young Lions |
|---|---|---|
| Frederic Mendy 28' 34' | Preview; Details; Report |

Queenstown Stadium
Attendance: 1,908
Referee: Sukhbir Singh
29 April 2010
19:45

| Beijing Guoan Talent | 2–1 | Woodlands Wellington |
|---|---|---|
| Tan Tiancheng 63'; Ma Chongchong 66' | Preview; Details; Report | Abdelhadi Laakkad 25' (pen.) |

Yishun Stadium
Attendance: 874
Referee: K Kalimuthu
30 April 2010
19:30

| Home United | 1–0 | Albirex Niigata |
|---|---|---|
| Shi Jiayi 10' (pen.) | Preview; Details; Report |

Jalan Besar Stadium
Attendance: 2,012
Referee: Zaid Hussein

=== Week 12 ===
The 12th week of the season runs from Monday 3 May to Saturday 8 May. Official Site Weekly Review

3 May 2010
19:45

| SAFFC | 3–1 | Woodlands Wellington |
|---|---|---|
| Federico Martinez 31' (pen.); John Wilkinson 48'; Luis Eduardo Hicks 64' (o.g.) | Preview; Details; Report | Kazuki Yoshino 90' (pen.) |

Choa Chu Kang Stadium
Attendance: 2,050
Referee: Adzhar Adziz
3 May 2010
19:45

| Albirex Niigata | 1–2 | Geylang United |
|---|---|---|
| Tatsuro Inui 50' | Preview; Details; Report | Rastislav Belicak 85'; Hafiz Rahim 90' |

Jurong East Stadium
Attendance: 1,245
Referee: Muhd Taqi
4 May 2010
19:45

| Etoile FC | 0–0 | Beijing Guoan Talent |
|---|---|---|
| | Preview; Details; Report |

Queenstown Stadium
Attendance: 1,337
Referee: Leow Thiam Hoe
5 May 2010
19:30

| Tampines Rovers | 3–2 | Balestier Khalsa |
|---|---|---|
| Aleksandar Duric 4'; Aliff Shafaein 31'; Khairul Amri 86' | Preview; Details; Report | Nurhilmi Jasni 60'; Rivaldo Costa 70' |

Jalan Besar Stadium
Attendance: 1,672
Referee: Abdul Malik
6 May 2010
19:45

| Home United | 1–1 | SAFFC |
|---|---|---|
| Shahril Ishak 8' | Preview; Details; Report | Federico Martinez 14' (pen.) |

Clementi Stadium
Attendance: 1,331
Referee: P Pandian
6 May 2010
19:45

| Woodlands Wellington | 1–1 | Young Lions |
|---|---|---|
| Syed Karim 85' | Preview; Details; Report | Khairul Nizam 90' |

Woodlands Stadium
Attendance: 1,270
Referee: Johan Jahari
7 May 2010
19:30

| Geylang United | 0–0 | Gombak United |
|---|---|---|
| | Preview; Details; Report |

Jalan Besar Stadium
Attendance: 1,850
Referee: Sukhbir Singh
8 May 2010
19:45

| Beijing Guoan Talent | 1–1 | Sengkang Punggol |
|---|---|---|
| Yu Tianzhu 86' | Preview; Details; Report | Ryan Fante 28' |

Yishun Stadium
Attendance: 815
Referee: Abdul Malik

=== Week 13 ===
The 13th week of the season runs from Monday 10 May to Saturday 15 May. Official Site Weekly Review

10 May 2010
19:45

| Gombak United | 0–1 | Balestier Khalsa |
|---|---|---|
| | Preview; Details; Report | Nurhilmi Jasni 68' |

Jurong West Stadium
Attendance: 1,577
Referee: K Kalimuthu
11 May 2010
19:45

| Tampines Rovers | 3–0 | Albirex Niigata |
|---|---|---|
| Akihiro Nakamura 17'; Aleksandar Duric 35' 78' | Preview; Details; Report |

Tampines Stadium
Attendance: 1,862
Referee: Abas Daud
12 May 2010
19:30

| Sengkang Punggol | 0–1 | Etoile FC |
|---|---|---|
| | Preview; Details; Report | Daniel Nna 76' |

Jalan Besar Stadium
Attendance: 1,772
Referee: Johan Jahari
13 May 2010
19:45

| Young Lions | 2–1 | Home United |
|---|---|---|
| Hafiz Abu Sujad 52'; Shahfiq Ghani 86' | Preview; Details; Report | Choi Chul Woo 17' |

Jalan Besar Stadium
Attendance: 2,168
Referee: Zaid Hussein
14 May 2010
19:30

| Tampines Rovers | 3–3 | Gombak United |
|---|---|---|
| Seiji Kaneko 45'; Qiu Li 70'; Bah Mamadou 90+1' o.g. | Preview; Details; Report | Fazrul Nawaz 13'; Zulkiffli Hassim 16'; Agu Casmir 90+2' |

Jalan Besar Stadium
Attendance: 2,304
Referee: Subkhiddin Mohd Salleh
15 May 2010
19:45

| Balestier Khalsa | 0–2 | Geylang United |
|---|---|---|
| | Preview; Details; Report | Syed Fadhil 8'; Peter Tomko 80' |

Toa Payoh Stadium
Attendance: 929
Referee: W Ravisanthiran

=== Week 14 ===
The 14th week of the season runs from Monday 17 May to Saturday 22 May. Official Site Weekly Review

17 May 2010
19:45

| SAFFC | 0–1 | Tampines Rovers |
|---|---|---|
| | Preview; Details; Report | Aleksandar Duric 86' |

Choa Chu Kang Stadium
Attendance: 3,396
Referee: K Kalimuthu
18 May 2010
19:45

| Woodlands Wellington | 0–2 | Etoile FC |
|---|---|---|
| | Preview; Details; Report | Matthias Verschave 16' (pen.); Kevin Yann 45' |

Woodlands Stadium
Attendance: 1,259
Referee: Muhd Taqi
18 May 2010
19:45

| Geylang United | 0–0 | Young Lions |
|---|---|---|
| | Preview; Details; Report |

Bedok Stadium
Attendance: 1,392
Referee: Abdul Malik
19 May 2010
19:30

| Home United | 3–2 | Beijing Guoan Talent |
|---|---|---|
| Shi Jiayi 12'; Shahril Ishak 38', 82' | Preview; Details; Report | Tan Tiancheng 64', 74' |

Jalan Besar Stadium
Attendance: 2,027
Referee: Sukhbir Singh
20 May 2010
19:45

| Gombak United | 3–0 | Sengkang Punngol |
|---|---|---|
| Hamqaamal Shah 12'; Agu Casmir 37'; Fazrul Nawaz 90' | Preview; Details; Report |

Jurong West Stadium
Attendance: 1,724
Referee: P Pandian
21 May 2010
19:30

| Balestier Khalsa | 1–1 | SAFFC |
|---|---|---|
| Anantha Rajan 88' | Preview; Details; Report | Indra Sahdan Daud 2' |

Jalan Besar Stadium
Attendance: 2,215
Referee: Abas Daud
22 May 2010
19:45

| Beijing Guoan Talent | 0–1 | Geylang United |
|---|---|---|
| | Preview; Details; Report | Peter Tomko 27' |

Yishun Stadium
Attendance: 934
Referee: Johan Jahari

=== Week 15 ===
The 15th week of the season runs from Tuesday 1 June to Sunday 6 June. Official Site Weekly Review

1 June 2010
19:45

| Geylang United | 0–3 | SAFFC |
|---|---|---|
| | Preview; Details; Report | Mustaqim Manzur 62'; Indra Sahdan Daud 74', 83' |

Bedok Stadium
Attendance: 1,557
Referee: K Kalimuthu
2 June 2010
19:30

| Etoile FC | 1–0 | Home United |
|---|---|---|
| Frédéric Mendy 74' | Preview; Details; Report |

Jalan Besar Stadium
Attendance: 1,908
Referee: Abdul Malik
3 June 2010
19:45

| Young Lions | 2–1 | Tampines Rovers |
|---|---|---|
| Safuwan Baharudin 11'; Fazli Ayob 59' | Preview; Details; Report | Zulkarnaen Zainal 29' (pen.) |

Jalan Besar Stadium
Attendance: 1,872
Referee: Sukhbir Singh
3 June 2010
19:45

| Albirex Niigata (S) | 0–1 | Balestier Khalsa |
|---|---|---|
| | Preview; Details; Report | Rivaldo Costa 53' |

Jurong East Stadium
Attendance: 1,261
Referee: W Ravisanthiran
4 June 2010
19:30

| SAFFC | 0–1 | Gombak United |
|---|---|---|
| | Preview; Details; Report | Park Kang Jin 23' |

Jalan Besar Stadium
Attendance: 2,652
Referee: Muhd Taqi
5 June 2010
19:45

| Geylang United | 0–1 | Etoile FC |
|---|---|---|
| | Preview; Details; Report | Frédéric Mendy 57' |

Bedok Stadium
Attendance: 1,620
Referee: Sukhbir Singh
5 June 2010
19:45

| Sengkang Marine | 0–1 | Woodlands Wellington |
|---|---|---|
| | Preview; Details; Report | Kazuki Yoshino 37' (pen.) |

Hougang Stadium
Attendance: 965
Referee: Adzhar Adziz
6 June 2010
19:45

| Tampines Rovers | 4–0 | Beijing Guoan Talent |
|---|---|---|
| Jamil Ali 10'; Aliff Shafaein 50'; Aleksandar Duric 56', 62' | Preview; Details; Report |

Tampines Stadium
Attendance: 2,194
Referee: Leow Thiam Hoe

=== Week 16 ===
The 16th week of the season runs from Monday 7 June to Friday 11 June. Official Site Weekly Review

7 June 2010
19:45

| Gombak United | 3–1 | Albirex Niigata (S) |
|---|---|---|
| Agu Casmir 18'; Fazrul Nawaz 52'; Zulkiffli Hassim 66' | Preview; Details; Report | Takaya Sugasawa 37' |

Jurong West Stadium
Attendance: 1,551
Referee: Abdul Malik
7 June 2010
19:45

| Balestier Khalsa | 0–3 | Young Lions |
|---|---|---|
| | Preview; Details; Report | Seo Su Jong 36'; Nazrul Ahmad Nazari 38'; Shahfiq Ghani 46' |

Toa Payoh Stadium
Attendance: 971
Referee: Sukhbir Singh
8 June 2010
19:45

| Sengkang Punggol | 0–1 | SAFFC |
|---|---|---|
| | Preview; Details; Report | Taisuke Akiyoshi 65' |

Hougang Stadium
Attendance: 1,049
Referee: Johan Jahari
8 June 2010
19:45

| Home United | 2–0 | Woodlands Wellington |
|---|---|---|
| Shi Jiayi 35'; Sufian Anuar 86' | Preview; Details; Report |

Clementi Stadium
Attendance: 1,249
Referee: Zaid Hussein
9 June 2010
19:30

| Etoile FC | 4–0 | Tampines Rovers |
|---|---|---|
| Frederic Mendy 23', 63'; Kevin Yann 45'; Matthias Verschave 85' | Preview; Details; Report |

Jalan Besar Stadium
Attendance: 2,056
Referee: K Kalimuthu
10 June 2010
19:45

| Young Lions | 1–0 | Gombak United |
|---|---|---|
| Safuwan Baharudin 64' | Preview; Details; Report |

Jalan Besar Stadium
Attendance: 1,921
Referee: Zaid Hussein
10 June 2010
19:45

| Beijing Guoan Talent | 1–0 | Balestier |
|---|---|---|
| Teng Bin 18' | Preview; Details; Report |

Yishun Stadium
Attendance: 818
Referee: Abdul Malik
11 June 2010
19:30

| Albirex Niigata (S) | 1–3 | SAFFC |
|---|---|---|
| Keisuke Matsui 6' | Preview; Details; Report | John Wilkinson 58'; Ivan Jerkovic 85'; Ruzaini Zainal 88' |

Jalan Besar Stadium
Attendance: 1,353
Referee: W Ravisanthiran

=== Week 17 ===
The 17th week of the season runs from Sunday 13 June to Saturday 19 June. Official Site Weekly Review

13 June 2010
19:30

| Woodlands Wellington | 0–0 | Geylang United |
|---|---|---|
| | Preview; Details; Report |

Woodlands Stadium
Attendance: 1,013
Referee: Muhd Taqi
14 June 2010
19:30

| Sengkang Punggol | 0–1 | Home United |
|---|---|---|
| | Preview; Details; Report | Chun Jae Woon 90' (pen.) |

Hougang Stadium
Attendance: 863
Referee: Sukhbir Singh
15 June 2010
19:30

| Gombak United | 0–1 | Beijing Guoan Talent |
|---|---|---|
| | Preview; Details; Report | Wang Hao 13' |

Jurong West Stadium
Attendance: 1,222
Referee: Abdul Malik
16 June 2010
19:30

| Balestier Khalsa | 0–3 | Etoile FC |
|---|---|---|
| | Preview; Details; Report | Frédéric Mendy 7', 27'; Matthias Verschave 24' |

Jalan Besar Stadium
Attendance: 1,289
Referee: W Ravisanthiran
17 June 2010
19:30

| Young Lions | 1–0 | SAFFC |
|---|---|---|
| Afiq Yunos 17' | Preview; Details; Report |

Jalan Besar Stadium
Attendance: 1,421
Referee: Muhd Taqi
18 June 2010
19:30

| Albirex Niigata (S) | 1–1 | Sengkang Punggol |
|---|---|---|
| Tatsuro Inui 36' (pen.) | Preview; Details; Report | Mamadou Diallo 42' |

Jalan Besar Stadium
Referee: Zaid Hussein
19 June 2010
19:30

| Geylang United | 0–3 | Home United |
|---|---|---|
| | Preview; Details; Report | Shahril Ishak 8' (pen.), 22', 69' |

Bedok Stadium
Attendance: 932
Referee: K Kalimuthu

=== Week 18 ===
The 18th week of the season runs from Monday 21 June to Saturday 26 June. Official Site Weekly Review

21 June 2010
19:30

| Tampines Rovers | 5–0 | Woodlands Wellington |
|---|---|---|
| Aleksandar Đurić 5'; Qiu Li 34', 59'; Benoît Croissant 55'; Khairul Amri 61' | Preview; Details; Report |

Tampines Stadium
Attendance: 1,091
Referee: Leow Thiam Hoe
22 June 2010
19:30

| Sengkang Punggol | 0–2 | Geylang United |
|---|---|---|
| | Preview; Details; Report | Itimi Dickson 1'; Kim Jae Hong 57' |

Hougang Stadium
Attendance: 759
Referee: Abdul Malik
23 June 2010
19:30

| Beijing Guoan Talent | 1–2 | SAFFC |
|---|---|---|
| Teng Bin 80' | Preview; Details; Report | Ahmad Latiff 60'; Ivan Jerkovic 66' |

Jalan Besar Stadium
Attendance: 680
Referee: Sukhbir Singh
24 June 2010
19:30

| Etoile FC | 0–0 | Gombak United |
|---|---|---|
| | Preview; Details; Report |

Queenstown Stadium
Attendance: 909
Referee: Johan Jahari
25 June 2010
19:30

| Young Lions | 1–1 | Albirex Niigata (S) |
|---|---|---|
| Harun 55' | Preview; Details; Report | Sugasawa 23' |

Jalan Besar Stadium
Attendance: 1,049
Referee: Leow Thiam Hoe
26 June 2010
19:30

| Woodlands Wellington | 1–2 | Balestier Khalsa |
|---|---|---|
| Musa 33' | Preview; Details; Report | Cunningham 63'; Costa 71' |

Woodlands Stadium
Attendance: 1,230
Referee: Zaid Hussein

=== Week 19 ===
The 19th week of the season runs from Monday 28 June to Sunday 4 July. Official Site Weekly Review

28 June 2010
19:30

| Home United | 1–0 | Tampines Rovers |
|---|---|---|
| Ismail Yunos 47' | Preview; Details; Report |

Clementi Stadium
Attendance: 1,454
Referee: Sukhbir Singh
29 June 2010
19:30

| Sengkang Punggol | 2–2 | Young Lions |
|---|---|---|
| Farizal Basri 37'; Sobrie Mazelan 72' | Preview; Details; Report | Khairul Nizam 25'; Fazli Ayob 55' |

Hougang Stadium
Attendance: 773
Referee: K Kalimuthu
30 June 2010
19:30

| SAFFC | 2–3 | Etoile FC |
|---|---|---|
| Park Tae Won 19'; Ahmad Latiff 65' | Preview; Details; Report | Frederic Mendy 3'; Kevin Yann 35'; Matthias Verschave 63' |

Jalan Besar Stadium
Attendance: 1,133
Referee: Abdul Malik
1 July 2010
19:30

| Balestier Khalsa | 0–1 | Home United |
|---|---|---|
| | Preview; Details; Report | Chun Jae Woon 86' |

Toa Payoh Stadium
Attendance: 903
Referee: W Ravisanthiran
1 July 2010
19:30

| Gombak United | 5–0 | Woodlands Wellington |
|---|---|---|
| Eddoh Pascal 25', 58'; Agu Casmir 61'; Fazrul Nawaz 68'; Zulkiffli Hassim 75' | Preview; Details; Report |

Jurong West Stadium
Attendance: 1,775
Referee: Johan Jahari
2 July 2010
19:30

| Albirex Niigata (S) | 1–0 | Beijing Guoan Talent |
|---|---|---|
| Bruno Castanheira 48' | Preview; Details; Report |

Jalan Besar Stadium
Referee: Muhd Taqi
4 July 2010
19:30

| Geylang United | 0–0 | Tampines Rovers |
|---|---|---|
| | Preview; Details; Report |

Bedok Stadium
Attendance: 1,396
Referee: K Kalimuthu

=== Week 20 ===
The 20th week of the season runs from Monday 5 July to Friday 9 July. Official Site Weekly Review

5 July 2010
19:30

| Home United | 2–0 | Gombak United |
|---|---|---|
| Shi Jiayi 9'; Jun Woo Keun 50' | Preview; Details; Report |

Clementi Stadium
Attendance: 1,528
Referee: Sukhbir Singh
6 July 2010
19:30

| Etoile FC | 0–1 | Albirex Niigata (S) |
|---|---|---|
| | Preview; Details; Report | Kazuki Kobayashi 55' |

Queenstown Stadium
Attendance: 1,018
Referee: Johan Jahari
7 July 2010
19:30

| Woodlands Wellington | 0–4 | SAFFC |
|---|---|---|
| | Preview; Details; Report | Park Tae Won 13', 76'; Hafiz Osman 32'; Indra Sahdan Daud 43' |

Jalan Besar Stadium
Attendance: 836
Referee: Leow Thiam Hoe
8 July 2010
19:30

| Tampines Rovers | 3–0 | Sengkang Punggol |
|---|---|---|
| Akihiro Nakamura 32'; Qiu Li 44'; Khairul Amri 86' | Preview; Details; Report |

Tampines Stadium
Attendance: 1,391
Referee: Zaid Hussein
8 July 2010
19:30

| Beijing Guoan Talent | 1–0 | Young Lions |
|---|---|---|
| Yu Tianzhu 8' | Preview; Details; Report |

Yishun Stadium
Attendance: 877
Referee: Abdul Malik
9 July 2010
19:30

| Geylang United | 0–0 | Balestier Khalsa |
|---|---|---|
| | Preview; Details; Report |

Jalan Besar Stadium
Attendance: 792
Referee: Johan Jahari

=== Week 21 ===
The 21st week of the season runs from Monday 12 July to Sunday 18 July. Official Site Weekly Review

12 July 2010
19:45

| Albirex Niigata (S) | 2–2 | Home United |
|---|---|---|
| Takaya Sugasawa 21', 90' | Preview; Details; Report | Shi Jiayi 79'; Shahril Ishak 90' |

Jurong East Stadium
Attendance: 1,448
Referee: K Kalimuthu
13 July 2010
19:45

| Young Lions | 1–2 | Etoile FC |
|---|---|---|
| Khalili D'cruz 89' | Preview; Details; Report | Karim Boudjema 2'; Matthias Verschave 10' |

Jalan Besar Stadium
Attendance: 1,068
Referee: Leow Thiam Hoe
14 July 2010
19:30

| Gombak United | 1–0 | Geylang United |
|---|---|---|
| Agu Casmir 61' | Preview; Details |

Jalan Besar Stadium
Attendance: 818
Referee: Abas Daud
15 July 2010
19:45

| Woodlands Wellington | 0–0 | Albirex Niigata (S) |
|---|---|---|
| | Preview; Details; Report |

Woodlands Stadium
Attendance: 1,424
Referee: W Ravisanthiran
16 July 2010
19:30

| SAFFC | 2–5 | Home United |
|---|---|---|
| John Wilkinson 53'; Park Tae Won 66' | Preview; Details; Report | Ishak 9', 40', 63'; Jun Woo Keun 46'; Sulaiman 90' |

Jalan Besar Stadium
Attendance: 1,923
Referee: Abdul Malik
17 July 2010
19:45

| Balestier Khalsa | 0–2 | Tampines Rovers |
|---|---|---|
| | Preview; Details | Qiu Li 43', 79' |

Toa Payoh Stadium
Attendance: 969
Referee: Muhd Taqi
18 July 2010
19:45

| Sengkang Punggol | 1–0 | Beijing Guoan Talent |
|---|---|---|
| Diallo 87' | Preview; Details; Report |

Hougang Stadium
Attendance: 831
Referee: Abas Daud

=== Week 22 ===
The 22nd week of the season runs from Monday 19 July to Sunday 25 July.Official Site Weekly Review

19 July 2010
19:45

| Young Lions | 1–0 | Woodlands Wellington |
|---|---|---|
| Ghani 2' | Preview; Details; Report |

Jalan Besar Stadium
Attendance: 1,531
Referee: Zaid Hussein
20 July 2010
19:45

| SAFFC | 0–2 | Geylang United |
|---|---|---|
| | Preview; Details; Report | Kim Jae Hong 41'; Tomko 82' |

Jalan Besar Stadium
Attendance: 1,869
Referee: Leow Thiam Hoe
21 July 2010
19:30

| Albirex Niigata (S) | 0–1 | Tampines Rovers |
|---|---|---|
| | Preview; Details; Report | Duric 20' |

Jalan Besar Stadium
Attendance: 903
Referee: Abdul Malik
22 July 2010
19:45

| Beijing Guoan Talent | 3–1 | Etoile FC |
|---|---|---|
| Zhang Ye 23'; Jiang Tao 51'; Liu Teng 60' | Preview; Details; Report | Moulin 78' |

Yishun Stadium
Attendance: 1,093
Referee: Muhd Taqi
23 July 2010
19:30

| Sengkang Punggol | 1–0 | Balestier Khalsa |
|---|---|---|
| Arai 24' | Preview; Details; Report |

Jalan Besar Stadium
Referee: Zaid HusseinHussein
25 July 2010
19:45

| Woodlands Wellington | 0–1 | Beijing Guoan Talent |
|---|---|---|
| | Preview; Details; Report | Zhang Ye 22' |

Woodlands Stadium
Attendance: 1,349
Referee: Johan Jahari

=== Week 23 ===
The 23rd week of the season runs from Monday 26 July to Sunday 1 August. Official Site Weekly Review

26 July 2010
19:45

| Balestier Khalsa | 1–1 | Albirex Niigata (S) |
|---|---|---|
| Borges 66' | Preview; Details; Report | Castanheira 37' |

Toa Payoh Stadium
Attendance: 939
Referee: Ahmad A'Qashah
27 July 2010
19:45

| Etoile FC | 1–0 | Sengkang Punggol |
|---|---|---|
| Frederic Mendy 31' | Preview; Details; Report |

Queenstown Stadium
Attendance: 917
Referee: W Ravisanthiran
28 July 2010
19:30

| Gombak United | 0–2 | Tampines Rovers |
|---|---|---|
| | Preview; Details; Report | Sahib 38'; Croissant 70' |

Jalan Besar Stadium
Attendance: 1,061
Referee: Leow Thiam Hoe
29 July 2010
19:45

| Home United | 2–1 | Young Lions |
|---|---|---|
| Anuar 68', 70' | Preview; Details; Report | Ramli 50' |

Clementi Stadium
Attendance: 1,513
Referee: Abdul Malik
30 July 2010
19:30

| Geylang United | 1–1 | Albirex Niigata (S) |
|---|---|---|
| Belicak 90' | Preview; Details; Report | Shimono 38' |

Jalan Besar Stadium
Attendance: 1,131
Referee: Abas Daud
31 July 2010
19:45

| Balestier Khalsa | 0–0 | Gombak United |
|---|---|---|
| | Preview; Details; Report |

Toa Payoh Stadium
Attendance: 874
Referee: Sukhbir Singh
1 August 2010
19:45

| Tampines Rovers | 2–0 | SAFFC |
|---|---|---|
| Duric 14'; Amri 90' (pen.) | Preview; Details; Report |

Tampines Stadium
Attendance: 1,406
Referee: Abdul Malik

=== Week 24 ===
The 24th week of the season runs from Monday 2 August to Sunday 8 August. Official Site Review

2 August 2010
19:45

| Beijing Guoan Talent | 0–3 | Home United |
|---|---|---|
| | Preview; Details; Report | Shi Jiayi 20'; Ishak 40'; Jun Woo Keun 89' |

Yishun Stadium
Attendance: 954
Referee: Leow Thiam Hoe
3 August 2010
19:45

| Young Lions | 2–2 | Geylang United |
|---|---|---|
| Ghindaru 67' (o.g.); Nizam 80' | Preview; Details; Report | Kim Jae Hong 19'; Hanapi 21' |

Jalan Besar Stadium
Attendance: 1,493
Referee: Abas Daud
4 August 2010
19:30

| Sengkang Punggol | 0–0 | Gombak United |
|---|---|---|
| | Preview; Details; Report |

Jalan Besar Stadium
Attendance: 826
Referee: Abdul Malik
5 August 2010
19:45

| Etoile FC | 2–0 | Woodlands Wellington |
|---|---|---|
| Boudjema 64'; Moulin 77' | Preview; Details; Report |

Queenstown Stadium
Attendance: 929
Referee: Zaid Hussein
6 August 2010
19:30

| SAFFC | 0–2 | Balestier Khalsa |
|---|---|---|
| | Preview; Details; Report | Osman 12' (o.g.); Borges 23' |

Jalan Besar Stadium
Attendance: 1,034
Referee: Abas Daud
7 August 2010
19:45

| Geylang United | 3–0 | Beijing Guoan Talent |
|---|---|---|
| Masturi 3'; Tomko 22'; Belicak 73' | Preview; Details; Report |

Bedok Stadium
Attendance: 874
Referee: W Ravisanthiran
8 August 2010
19:45

| Woodlands Wellington | 0–1 | Sengkang Punggol |
|---|---|---|
| | Preview; Details; Report | Webb 80' |

Woodlands Stadium
Attendance: 1,234
Referee: Muhd Taqi

=== Week 25 ===
The 25th week of the season runs from Monday 30 August to Sunday 5 September. Official Site Weekly Review

30 August 2010
19:45

| Young Lions | 0–2 | Balestier Khalsa |
|---|---|---|
| | Preview; Details; Report | Paul Cunningham 3'; Rivaldo Costa 68' |

Jalan Besar Stadium
Attendance: 708
Referee: Muhd Taqi

30 August 2010
19:45

| Albirex Niigata (S) | 1–2 | Gombak United |
|---|---|---|
| Akiya Wada 90' | Preview; Details; Report | Chang Jo Yoon 23' (pen.); Fazrul Nawaz 52' |

Jurong East Stadium
Attendance: 1,365
Referee: Zaid Hussein

31 August 2010
19:45

| Woodlands Wellington | 1–2 | Home United |
|---|---|---|
| Rizawan Abdullah 40' | Preview; Details; Report | Shahril Ishak 6'; Choi Chul Woo 60' |

Woodlands Stadium
Attendance: 1,010
Referee: Sukhbir Singh

31 August 2010
19:45

| Etoile FC | 1–0 | Geylang United |
|---|---|---|
| Karim Boudjema 74' | Preview; Details; Report |

Queenstown Stadium
Attendance: 907
Referee: Abas Daud

1 September 2010
19:30

| Beijing Guoan Talent | 2–5 | Tampines Rovers |
|---|---|---|
| Wang Hao 17' (pen.); Teng Bin 80' | Preview; Details; Report | Aliff Shafaein 31'; Aleksandar Duric 71', 90'; Shahdan Sulaiman 74'; Khairul Amri 90' |

Jalan Besar Stadium
Attendance: 591
Referee: Leow Thiam Hoe

2 September 2010
19:45

| SAFFC | 2–1 | Sengkang Punggol |
|---|---|---|
| John Wilkinson 60'; Ivan Jerkovic 77' | Preview; Details; Report | Jordan Webb 6' (pen.) |

Choa Chu Kang Stadium
Attendance: 943
Referee: Zaid Hussein

3 September 2010
19:30

| Home United | 1–0 | Etoile FC |
|---|---|---|
| Shahril Ishak 19' | Preview; Details; Report |

Jalan Besar Stadium
Attendance: 1,105
Referee: Abdul Malik

4 September 2010
19:45

| Tampines Rovers | 1–1 | Young Lions |
|---|---|---|
| Aliff Shafaein 43' | Preview; Details; Report | Nazrul Ahmad Nazari 85' |

Tampines Stadium
Attendance: 1,365
Referee: Sukhbir Singh

5 September 2010
19:45

| Gombak United | 0–2 | SAFFC |
|---|---|---|
| | Preview; Details; Report | Federico Martinez 70', 84' (pen.) |

Jurong West Stadium
Attendance: 1,052
Referee: Leow Thiam Hoe

=== Week 26 ===
The 26th week of the season runs from Monday 6 September to Wednesday 8 September. Official Site Weekly Review

6 September 2010
19:45

| Geylang United | 0–1 | Woodlands Wellington |
|---|---|---|
| | Preview; Details; Report | Noor Ali 85' |

Bedok Stadium
Attendance: 928
Referee: Abdul Malik

6 September 2010
19:45

| Home United | 2–2 | Sengkang Punggol |
|---|---|---|
| Choi Chul Woo 52'; Shi Jiayi 63' | Preview; Details; Report | Mamadou Diallo 35'; Jordan Webb 41' |

Clementi Stadium
Attendance: 1,004
Referee: Muhd Taqi

7 September 2010
19:45

| Young Lions | 1–1 | Beijing Guoan Talent |
|---|---|---|
| Afiq Yunos 88' | Preview; Details; Report | Zhang Ye 48' |

Jalan Besar Stadium
Attendance: 814
Referee: Zaid Hussein

8 September 2010
19:30

| Tampines Rovers | 1–2 | Etoile FC |
|---|---|---|
| Aliff Shafaein 59' | Preview; Details; Report | Frederic Mendy 50'; Flavien Michelini 66' |

Jalan Besar Stadium
Attendance: 1,350
Referee: Abas Daud

=== Week 27 ===
The 27th week of the season runs from Monday 13 September to Friday 17 September. Official Site Weekly Review

14 September 2010
19:45

| Home United | 1–0 | Geylang United |
|---|---|---|
| Chun Jae Woon 19' | Preview; Details; Report |

Clementi Stadium
Attendance: 1,117
Referee: Leow Thiam Hoe

15 September 2010
19:30

| Sengkang Punggol | 0–1 | Albirex Niigata (S) |
|---|---|---|
| | Preview; Details; Report | Mitsuki Ichihara 37' |

Jalan Besar Stadium
Attendance: 717
Referee: Sukhbir Singh

16 September 2010
19:45

| Woodlands Wellington | 2–4 | Tampines Rovers |
|---|---|---|
| Azlan Alipah 40' (pen.); Abdelhadi Laakkad 78' | Preview; Details; Report | Aleksandar Đurić 19' (pen.), 54'; Aliff Shafaein 60'; Ismadi Mukhtar 63' |

Woodlands Stadium
Attendance: 1,080
Referee: P Pandian

17 September 2010
19:30

| Etoile FC | 3–0 | Balestier Khalsa |
|---|---|---|
| Flavien Michelini 6'; Frédéric Mendy 33'; Karim Boudjema 38' | Preview; Details; Report |

Queenstown Stadium
Attendance: 741
Referee: Abdul Malik

=== Week 28 ===
The 28th week of the season runs from Tuesday 21 September to Friday 24 September. Official Site Weekly Review

21 September 2010
19:45

| Tampines Rovers | 0–3 | Home United |
|---|---|---|
| | Preview; Details | Jean Woo-Keun 37'; Shahril Ishak 43'; Sufian Anuar 68' |

Tampines Stadium
Attendance: 1,575
Referee: Abas Daud

22 September 2010
19:30

| Gombak United | 0–1 | Etoile FC |
|---|---|---|
| | Preview; Details; Report | Matthias Verschave 51' |

Jalan Besar Stadium
Attendance: 856
Referee: Leow Thiam Hoe

24 September 2010
19:30

| Balestier Khalsa | 1–1 | Woodlands Wellington |
|---|---|---|
| Abdelhadi Laakkad 50' (pen.) | Preview; Details; Report | Paul Cunningham 20' |

Jalan Besar Stadium
Attendance: 873
Referee: Abas Daud

=== Week 29 ===
The 29th week of the season runs from Monday 27 September to Wednesday 29 September. Official Site Weekly Review

27 September 2010
19:45

| Beijing Guoan Talent | 1–1 | Gombak United |
|---|---|---|
| Tang Xin 54' | Preview; Details | Chang Jo Yoon 43' |

Yishun Stadium
Attendance: 839
Referee: P Pandian

29 September 2010
19:30

| Geylang United | 4–1 | Sengkang Punggol |
|---|---|---|
| Vasile Ghindaru 16'; Peter Tomko 31'; Kim Jae Hong 45'; Rastislav Belicak 84' | Preview; Details; Report | Mamadou Diallo 88' |

Jalan Besar Stadium
Attendance: 772
Referee: Zaid Hussein

=== Week 30 ===
The 30th week of the season runs from Monday 4 October to Thursday 7 October. Official Site Weekly Review

4 October 2010
19:45

| Young Lions | 0–1 | Sengkang Punggol |
|---|---|---|
| | Preview; Details; Report | Kenji Arai 48' |

Jalan Besar Stadium
Attendance: 996
Referee: P Pandian

4 October 2010
19:45

| SAFFC | 1–2 | Albirex Niigata (S) |
|---|---|---|
| Federico Martinez 68' (pen.) | Preview; Details; Report | Bruno Castanheira 10'; Tatsuro Inui 50' (pen.) |

Choa Chu Kang Stadium
Attendance: 800
Referee: Sukhbir Singh

6 October 2010
19:30

| Woodlands Wellington | 0–3 | Gombak United |
|---|---|---|
| | Preview; DetailsReport | Chang Jo Yoon 64'; Fazrul Nawaz 80'; Hamqaamal Shah 85' |

Jalan Besar Stadium
Attendance: 721
Referee: W Ravisanthiran

7 October 2010
19:45

| SAFFC | 5–2 | Young Lions |
|---|---|---|
| Martinez 22' 84' (pen.); Gunawan 58' 64'; Shah 85' (o.g.) | Preview; Details; Report | Harun 24'; Yunos 76' |

Choa Chu Kang Stadium
Attendance: 932
Referee: Muhd Taqi

7 October 2010
19:45

| Home United | 0–0 | Balestier Khalsa |
|---|---|---|
| | Preview; Details; Report |

Clementi Stadium
Attendance: 1,100
Referee: Leow Thiam Hoe

=== Week 31 ===
The 31st week of the season runs from Monday 11 October to Thursday 14 October. Official Site Weekly Review

11 October 2010
19:45

| Tampines Rovers | 2–1 | Geylang United |
|---|---|---|
| Seiji Kaneko 69'; Aleksandar Duric 80' | Preview; Details; Report | Hafiz Rahim 76' (pen.) |

Tampines Stadium
Attendance: 1,313
Referee: Abas Daud

12 October 2010
19:45

| Albirex Niigata (S) | 1–1 | Young Lions |
|---|---|---|
| Bruno Castanheira 67' (pen.) | Preview; Details; Report | Safuwan Baharudin 50' |

Jurong East Stadium
Attendance: 1,304
Referee: Johan Jahari

13 October 2010
19:30

| Balestier Khalsa | 3–0 | Beijing Guoan Talent |
|---|---|---|
| Vitor Borges de Souza 33'; Rivaldo Costa 48', 56' | Preview; Details; Report |

Jalan Besar Stadium
Attendance: 773
Referee: Muhd Taqi

14 October 2010
19:45

| Etoile FC | 0–3 | SAFFC |
|---|---|---|
| | Preview; Details; Report | Ivan Jerkovic 35'; Federico Martinez 85' (pen.); John Wilkinson 90' (pen.) |

Queenstown Stadium
Attendance: 994
Referee: P Pandian

=== Week 32 ===
The 32nd week of the season runs from Monday 18 October to Sunday 24 October. Official Site Weekly Review

18 October 2010
19:45

| Gombak United | 1–1 | Young Lions |
|---|---|---|
| Fabian Tan 78' | Preview; Details; Report | Luka Savic 21' |

Jurong West Stadium
Attendance: 1,794
Referee: Ahmad A'Qashah

19 October 2010
19:45

| Beijing Guoan Talent | 1–3 | Albirex Niigata (S) |
|---|---|---|
| Li Tixiang 45' | Preview; Details; Report | Tatsuro Inui 34'; Keisuke Matsui 38'; Tatsuro Inui 88' |

Yishun Stadium
Attendance: 880
Referee: Abas Daud

20 October 2010
19:30

| SAFFC | 1–0 | Woodlands Wellington |
|---|---|---|
| Federico Martinez 50' | Preview; Details; Report |

Jalan Besar Stadium
Attendance: 1,088
Referee: Abdul Malik

22 October 2010
19:45

| Gombak United | 1–1 | Home United |
|---|---|---|
| Jeremy Chiang 62' | Preview; Details; Report | Shi Jiayi 45' |

Jalan Besar Stadium
Attendance: 847
Referee: Abas Daud

23 October 2010
19:45

| Sengkang Punggol | 1–3 | Tampines Rovers |
|---|---|---|
| Kenji Arai 74' (pen.) | Preview; Details; Report | Aliff Shafaein 4'; Aleksandar Duric 79', 90' |

Hougang Stadium
Attendance: 892
Referee: Zaid Hussein

23 October 2010
19:45

| Etoile FC | 3–0 | Young Lions |
|---|---|---|
| Loic Leclercq 5' (pen.); Frédéric Mendy 11'; Anthony Moulin 83' | Preview; Details; Report |

Queenstown Stadium
Attendance: 817
Referee: Sukhbir Singh

24 October 2010
19:45

| Balestier Khalsa | 0–1 | Geylang United |
|---|---|---|
| | Preview; Details; Report | Peter Tomko 12' |

Toa Payoh Stadium
Attendance: 865
Referee: W Ravisanthiran

=== Week 33 ===
The 33rd week of the season will be played on Tuesday 26 October.

26 October 2010
19:45

| SAFFC | 4–2 | Beijing Guoan Talent |
|---|---|---|
| Park Tae Won 6', 45', 85'; John Wilkinson 78' | Preview; Details; Report | Wang Hao 2'; Jiang Tao 65' |

Choa Chu Kang Stadium
Attendance: 954
Referee: Sukhbir Singh

=== Week 34 ===
The 34th week of the season will be played on Wednesday 3 November.

3 November 2010
19:30

| Albirex Niigata (S) | 1–0 | Woodlands Wellington |
|---|---|---|
| Kazuki Kobayashi 90' | Preview; Details; Report |

Jalan Besar Stadium
Attendance: 844
Referee: Zaid Hussein

=== Week 35 ===
The 35th week of the season will be played from Wednesday 10 November to Friday 12 November.

10 November 2010
19:30

| Home United | 0–0 | SAFFC |
|---|---|---|
| | Preview; Details; Report |

Jalan Besar Stadium
Attendance: 1,428
Referee: Leow Thiam Hoe

10 November 2010
19:30

| Albirex Niigata (S) | 2–4 | Etoile FC |
|---|---|---|
| Kazuki Kobayashi 3', 45' | Preview; Details; Report | Loic Leclercq 32' (pen.); Frederic Mendy 64', 77'; Matthias Verschave 81' |

Jurong East Stadium
Attendance: 1,750
Referee: Muhd Taqi

10 November 2010
19:30

| Tampines Rovers | 4–1 | Balestier Khalsa |
|---|---|---|
| Aleksandar Đurić 5'; Aliff Shafaein 19'; Jamil Ali 43'; Ismadi Mukhtar 83' | Preview; Details; Report | Paul Cunningham 75' |

Tampines Stadium
Attendance: 1,347
Referee: Sukhbir Singh

11 November 2010
19:45

| Geylang United | 0–0 | Gombak United |
|---|---|---|
| | Preview; Details; Report |

Bedok Stadium
Attendance: 964
Referee: Abdul Malik

12 November 2010
19:30

| Beijing Guoan Talent | 1–0 | Sengkang Punggol |
|---|---|---|
| Wang Hao 69' | Preview; Details |

Jalan Besar Stadium
Attendance: 783
Referee: Abas Daud

== Stadia and attendance ==
=== Stadia ===
| Team | Stadium | Capacity | Notes |
|---|---|---|---|
| (Japan) Albirex Niigata (S) | Jurong East Stadium | 2,700 | |
| Balestier Khalsa | Toa Payoh Stadium | 3,900 | |
| (China) Beijing Guoan Talent | Yishun Stadium | 3,400 | |
| (France) Étoile | Queenstown Stadium | 3,800 | |
| Geylang United | Bedok Stadium | 3,900 | |
| Gombak United | Jurong West Stadium | 3,200 | |
| Home United | Clementi Stadium | 4,000 | Moved from Bishan Stadium which is undergoing upgrading |
| Singapore Armed Forces | Choa Chu Kang Stadium | 4,600 | |
| Sengkang Punggol | Hougang Stadium | 2,500 | |
| Tampines Rovers | Tampines Stadium | 3,600 | |
| Woodlands Wellington | Woodlands Stadium | 4,300 | |
| (Singapore) Young Lions | Jalan Besar Stadium | 6,000 | |

- All Friday matches, televised live on MediaCorp Channel 5, are played at the Jalan Besar Stadium. However, the time period of the 2010 Youth Olympic Games will see matches being played at the home stadium of the respective home team.

== See also ==
- 2010 Singapore Cup
- 2010 Singapore League Cup
