= 2010 Singapore Cup =

Tournament details
- Country: Singapore
- Dates: May 2010 - November 2010
- Teams: 16

Final positions
- Champions: (Thailand) Bangkok Glass
- Runners-up: Tampines Rovers

Tournament statistics
- Top goal scorer: (Thailand) Chatree Chimtalay 5 goal

The 2010 Singapore Cup (known as the RHB Singapore Cup for sponsorship reasons) started on 24 May 2010. It was the 13th edition of the annual Singapore Cup soccer tournament.

12 S.League clubs and 4 invited foreign teams played in this edition. The cup was a single-elimination tournament, with all sixteen teams playing from the first round. The first round involved one-off matches. Subsequent rounds involved ties of two legs.

The first round kicked off between 24 and 31 May, with the quarter-finals played from 27 September to 15 October, and the semi-finals on 25 to 29 October. The final was played on 14 November.

== Teams ==
S.League Clubs

- (Japan) Albirex Niigata (S)
- (Singapore) Balestier Khalsa
- (China) Beijing Guoan Talent
- (France) Etoile FC
- (Singapore) Geylang United
- (Singapore) Gombak United
- (Singapore) Home United
- (Singapore) Sengkang Punggol
- * Singapore Armed Forces FC (SAFFC)
- * (Singapore) Tampines Rovers
- * (Singapore) Woodlands Wellington
- * (Singapore) Young Lions FC (FAS under-23 team)

Invited Foreign Teams

- (Australia) South Melbourne
- (Thailand) Bangkok Glass
- (Cambodia) Phnom Penh Crown
- (Hong Kong) Kitchee

== Knockout bracket ==
Round of 16
Tampines Rovers	2
Woodlands Wellington	1
Balestier Khalsa	2
Geylang United	1
(Singapore) Young Lions FC	2
Home United	0
Sengkang Punggol	0
(Japan) Albirex Niigata (S)	1
(Australia) South Melbourne	2
Gombak United	1
SAFFC	3
(Thailand) Bangkok Glass	5
(Cambodia) Phnom Penh Crown	1
(France) Etoile FC	2
(China) Beijing Guoan Talent	1
(Hong Kong) Kitchee	2

Quarterfinals
Tampines Rovers	3	3	6
Balestier Khalsa	0	1	1
(Singapore) Young Lions FC	1	0	1
(Japan) Albirex Niigata (S)	0	0	0
(Australia) South Melbourne	1	3	4
(Thailand) Bangkok Glass	3	3	6
(France) Etoile FC	2	4	6
(Hong Kong) Kitchee	0	4	4

Semifinals
Tampines Rovers	2	1	3
(Singapore) Young Lions FC	0	0	0
(Thailand) Bangkok Glass	1	2	3
(France) Etoile FC	1	0	1

Final
Tampines Rovers	0
(Thailand) Bangkok Glass	1

== Preliminary round ==
Official Website Review

May 24, 2010
19:45

Young Lions FC (Singapore)	2 – 0	Home United
Fairoz Hasan 5'; Khairul Nizam 52'	Preview; Details; Report

Jalan Besar Stadium
Attendance: 1,821
Referee: P Pandian

May 25, 2010
19:45

Balestier Khalsa	2 – 1	Geylang United
K Vikraman 38', 45'	Preview; Details; Report	Tomko 72'; Masrezwan Masturi (red card) 77'

Toa Payoh Stadium
Attendance: 1,035
Referee: Muhd Taqi

May 26, 2010
19:30

South Melbourne (Australia)	2 – 1	Gombak United
Vasilevski 11'; Youssef 38'	Preview; Details; Report	Casmir 27'

Jalan Besar Stadium
Attendance: 2,039
Referee: Abdul Malik

May 27, 2010
19:45

SAFFC	3 – 5	(Thailand) Bangkok Glass
Wilkinson 6', 41'; Martinez 53' (pen.)	Preview; Details; Report	Anawin 4'; Sutee 59', 67'; Chatree 78'; Ekollo 90'

Choa Chu Kang Stadium
Attendance: 2,376
Referee: Leow Thiam Hoe

May 28, 2010
19:30

Phnom Penh Crown (Cambodia)	1 – 2	(France) Etoile FC
Sokngon 35' (pen.)	Preview; Details; Report	Mendy 45+2', 55'

Jalan Besar Stadium
Attendance: 2,031
Referee: K Kalimuthu

May 29, 2010
19:45

Sengkang Punggol	0 – 1	(Japan) Albirex Niigata (S)
Shahir Hamzah (red card) 80'	Preview; Details; Report	Hayashi 50'

Hougang Stadium
Attendance: 1,174
Referee: Sukhbir Singh

May 30, 2010
19:45

Tampines Rovers	2 – 1 aet	Woodlands Wellington
Nakamura 47'; Aliff Shafaein 112'	Preview; Details; Report	Laakkad 56'

Tampines Stadium
Attendance: 2,494
Referee: Johan Jahari

May 31, 2010
19:45

Beijing Guoan Talent (China)	1 – 2 aet	(Hong Kong) Kitchee
Li Tixiang 15'; Yu Yang (red card) 99'	Preview; Details; Report	Cheng Siu Wai 67'; Michael Cheng 111'

Yishun Stadium
Attendance: 896
Referee: P Pandian

== Quarterfinals ==
=== First leg ===
September 27, 2010
19:45

Tampines Rovers	3 – 0	Balestier Khalsa
Duric 9', 80'; Sulaiman 44'	Preview; Details; Report

Tampines Stadium
Attendance: 1,158
Referee: Leow Thiam Hoe

September 28, 2010
19:45

Etoile FC (France)	2 – 0	(Hong Kong) Kitchee
Deletraz 31'; Boudjema 73'	Preview; Details; Report

Queenstown Stadium
Attendance: 721
Referee: Sukhbir Singh

October 5, 2010
19:30

South Melbourne (Australia)	1 – 3	(Thailand) Bangkok Glass
Vasilevski 20'	Preview; Details; Report	Sarun 60' Gbenga 70' Chatree 82'

Jalan Besar Stadium
Attendance: 1,045
Referee: Abas Daud

October 9, 2010
19:45

Young Lions FC (Singapore)	1 – 0	(Japan) Albirex Niigata (S)
Hafiz Abu Sujad 76'	Preview; Details; Report

Jalan Besar Stadium
Attendance: 942
Referee: W Ravisanthiran

=== Second leg ===
September 30, 2010
19:45

Balestier Khalsa	1 – 3	Tampines Rovers
Vikraman 16'	Preview; Details; Report	Amri 45'; Shafaein 66'; Mad 88'

Toa Payoh Stadium
Attendance: 870
Referee: Abas Daud

Tampines Rovers won 6–1 on aggregate.

October 1, 2010
19:30

Kitchee (Hong Kong)	4 – 4	(France) Etoile FC
Luzardo 16' (pen.); Lakehal 45' (o.g.); Liang Zicheng 57'; Morandini 71' (o.g.); Tsang Kam To (red card) 90'	Preview; Details	Lakehal 2'; Mendy 63'; Souchon 72'; Moulin 77'

Jalan Besar Stadium
Attendance: 989
Referee: Zaid Hussein

Etoile won 6–4 on aggregate.

October 8, 2010
19:30

Bangkok Glass (Thailand)	3 – 3	(Australia) South Melbourne
Chimtale 27', 41'; Ajayi 86'	Preview; Details; Report	Gianni De Nittis 31', 74'; Fernando 37' (pen.)

Jalan Besar Stadium
Attendance: 931
Referee: P Pandian

Bangkok won 6–4 on aggregate.

October 15, 2010
19:30

Albirex Niigata (S) (Japan)	0 – 0	(Singapore) Young Lions
	Preview; Details; Report

Jurong East Stadium
Attendance: 1,068
Referee: Leow Thiam Hoe

Lions won 1–0 on aggregate.

== Semi-finals ==
=== First leg ===
October 27, 2010
19:45

Tampines Rovers	2 – 0	(Singapore) Young Lions FC
Đurić 21'; Sulaiman 82' (pen.)	Preview; Details; Report

Tampines Stadium
Attendance: 1,269
Referee: Muhd Taqi

October 29, 2010
19:30

Bangkok Glass (Thailand)	1 – 1	(France) Etoile FC
Suksomkit 61'	Preview; Details; Report	Deletraz 16'

Jalan Besar Stadium
Attendance: 1,194
Referee: Leow Thiam Hoe

=== Second leg ===
October 30, 2010
19:45

Young Lions FC (Singapore)	0 – 1	Tampines Rovers
	Preview; Details; Report	Duric 30'

Jalan Besar Stadium
Attendance: 779
Referee: W Ravisanthiran

Tampines Rovers wins 3–0 on aggregate.

November 5, 2010
19:45

Etoile FC (France)	0 – 2	(Thailand) Bangkok Glass
	Preview; Details; Report	Chimtale 54'; Ajayi 90'

Queenstown Stadium
Attendance: 1,246
Referee: Abdul Malik

Bangkok wins 3–1 on aggregate.

== Third-place Playoff ==
November 13, 2010
19:30

Young Lions (Singapore)	0 – 3	(France) Etoile FC
	Preview; Details; Report	Moulin 11', 90'; N'cho 59'

Jalan Besar Stadium
Attendance: 619
Referee: Abdul Malik

== Final ==
November 14, 2010
19:30

Tampines Rovers	0 – 1	(Thailand) Bangkok Glass
	Preview; Details	Croissant 57' (o.g.)

Jalan Besar Stadium
Attendance: 3,943
Referee: Ng Kai Lam

== Goalscorers ==
Rank	Scorer	Club	Goals
1	(Thailand) Chatree Chimtalay	(Thailand) Bangkok Glass	5
2	(Singapore) Aleksandar Duric	Tampines Rovers	4
3	(Thailand) Sutee Suksomkit	(Thailand) Bangkok Glass	3
3	(Nigeria) Gbenga Ajayi	(Thailand) Bangkok Glass	3
3	(France) Frédéric Mendy	(France) Etoile FC	3
3	(Singapore) K Vikraman	Balestier Khalsa	3

== See also ==
- Singapore Cup
- 2010 S.League
- 2010 Singapore League Cup
- Singapore football league system
- Football in Singapore
