= Mansour Lakehal =

French footballer, midfield (born 1983)

Personal information
- Date of birth: December 30, 1983 (age 42)
- Place of birth: France
- Position: Defender

Senior career*
Years	Team	Apps	(Gls)
2003/2004	Carbonne		
2004–20xx	Toulouse Saint-Jo		
2005/2006	Saint Simon		
2006–2007	Toulouse Rodéo FC		
2007–2008	US Colomiers		
2008–2009	Toulouse Rodéo FC		
2009	Saint Jean		
2010	Etoile FC	27	(0)
2011	CS Constantine (training)		
2011–2012	AFC Compiègne	18	(0)
2013	ASPM		
2013–2014	Toulouse Rodéo FC	6	(0)
2014	Cazères		
2014–2015	AS Toulouse Mirail		
2015	US Seysses Frouzins		
2015–2016	US Colomiers		(1)
2016–2017	CO Castelnaudary		
2017–20xx	Toulouse Rodéo FC		
2018–20xx	J.Ent. Toul. Croix Daur		
- * Club domestic league appearances and goals

Mansour Lakehal (born 30 December 1983) is a French professional footballer.

== Professional career ==
Attending a tryout for Etoile, an all-French side newly installed in the 2010 S.League, Lakehal landed his first professional contract. He stated that it was not easy to adapt at first due to being away from loved ones, which was made harder by the heat and the language barrier of his new place of work. Scooping up the 2010 S.League and League Cup trophies, the center-back was voted the championship's best defender, nicknamed 'The Rock'. Despite forming a solid back line with fellow center-back Loïc Leclercq, an infuriated Lakehal was reported to have slapped Tampines Rovers' Benoit Croissant in a game as they were held 1-1, ending up having to sit out for three games.
