= Verschave =

Verschave is a surname. Notable people with the surname include:

- Matthias Verschave (born 1977), French footballer
- François-Xavier Verschave (1945–2005), French economist, historian, and activist
