= Khaled Kharroubi =

Algerian footballer (born 1984)

Personal information
- Full name: Khaled Farid Kharroubi
- Date of birth: 11 February 1984 (age 42)
- Place of birth: Lyon, France
- Height: 1.80 m (5 ft 11 in)
- Position: Central midfielder

Youth career
- 1992–1997: Olympique Lyon
- 1997–2001: Grenoble Foot

Senior career*
Years	Team	Apps	(Gls)
2002–2003	Bangu	7	(0)
2003–2004	→ Vitória (loan)	0	(0)
2004–2008	Valenciennes	64	(1)
2008–2009	FCV Dender	8	(0)
2010	Etoile FC	16	(1)
2011	Osotspa Saraburi FC	29	(0)
2012	BEC Tero Sasana	28	(1)
2014	MC Oran	1	(0)
2016–2017	Adana Demirspor	1	(0)
2018–	Venissieux	0	(0)

International career^{‡}
2006	Algeria	1	(0)
- * Club domestic league appearances and goals as of 20 January 2015 ‡ National team caps and goals as of 28 October 2010

Khaled Farid Kharroubi (Arabic: خالد خروبي) (born 11 February 1984 in Lyon, France) is an Algerian footballer.

== Biography ==
Kharroubi started playing football at the age of 6 in his neighborhood club US Vénissieux. At the age of 8, he joined the Olympique Lyon academy, and stayed with the club until the age of 15. He would then join the academy at Grenoble Foot for another 4 years, reaching the semi-finals of the Coupe Gambardella, before leaving to Brazil at age 19 to sign with Bangu. After one season, he was loaned out to Série A side Esporte Clube Vitória and at the end of the season he would come back to France to join Valenciennes FC in the French Championnat National. In his first season, he played 33 games and helped the team finish first in the tables gaining promotion to Ligue 2. In his second season, injuries limited him to just 10 games (and 1 goal) but his team still finished first in the standings, gaining promotion to Ligue 1. In his first season in the top flight, Kharroubi again managed just 10 games. Injuries again limited him to just 3 games in his second season in Ligue 1.

On 4 June 2008 he signed a 2-year contract with newly promoted Belgian club FCV Dender. After left Dender he was signed in 2010 by Etoile FC for their debut appearance in the S.League where he was part of the double-winning squad that took the S.League and League Cup titles. Kharroubi played for Osotspa Saraburi FC in Thailand.

On 18 August 2016 he signed one-year deal with Turkish side Adana Demirspor. On 21 September 2016 he played his first official match for Demirspor against Erzurum BB in a Turkish Cup meeting. He just played only two matches for Demirspor in 2016. Then, in early 2017, he left Turkey and back to France.

== International career ==
Although born in France, Kharroubi has represented Algeria in international competition. In June 2005 he was called up to a training camp by the Under-23 national team. In August 2006 he was called up by Jean-Michel Cavalli to the Algerian National Team for friendlies against FC Istres and Gabon. He started the game against FC Istres but did not feature in the second game.

== Honours ==
- Won the French Championnat National once with Valenciennes FC in 2004/2005
- Won the Ligue 2 Championship once with Valenciennes FC in 2005/2006
- Won the 2010 Singapore League Cup with Etoile FC in 2010
- Won the 2010 S.League with Etoile FC in 2010

== Personal ==
Kharroubi's family hails from the city of Chlef in Algeria and the player has admitted that he is a big fan of local club ASO Chlef.
