= Teng Bin =

Chinese association football player

Personal information
- Date of birth: 24 July 1985 (age 41)
- Height: 1.75 m (5 ft 9 in)
- Position: Midfielder

Senior career*
Years	Team	Apps	(Gls)
2010	Beijing Guoan Talent (Singapore)	27	(3)
2011	Nanchang Hengyuan	5	(1)
2012–2013	Qinghai Senke		
Total		32	(4)
- * Club domestic league appearances and goals

Teng Bin (Chinese: 滕彬; pinyin: Téng Bīn; born 24 July 1985) is a Chinese former footballer.

== Career statistics ==
=== Club ===
Club	Season	League			Cup		Continental		Other		Total	
Club	Season	Division	Apps	Goals	Apps	Goals	Apps	Goals	Apps	Goals	Apps	Goals
Beijing Guoan Talent (Singapore)	2010	S. League	27	3	0	0	–		0	0	27	3
Nanchang Hengyuan	2011	Chinese Super League	5	1	0	0	–		0	0	5	1
Career total			32	4	0	0	0	0	0	0	32	4
