= Leeroy Anton =

French association football player (born 1985)

Personal information
- Full name: Leeroy Anton Matesanz
- Date of birth: 4 May 1985 (age 41)
- Place of birth: Lyon, France
- Height: 1.70 m (5 ft 7 in)
- Position: Midfielder

Youth career
- –2005: Olympique Lyonnais

Senior career*
Years	Team	Apps	(Gls)
2005–2006	Rouen		
2006	Lyon La Duchère		
2007–2008	Noja		
2008	UR Namur	4	(0)
2010	Étoile	10	(0)
- * Club domestic league appearances and goals

Leeroy Anton Matesanz (born 4 May 1985) is a French former footballer.

== Career statistics ==
=== Club ===
Club	Season	League			National Cup		League Cup		Other		Total	
Club	Season	Division	Apps	Goals	Apps	Goals	Apps	Goals	Apps	Goals	Apps	Goals
UR Namur	2008–09	EXQI League	4	0	0	0	–		0	0	4	0
Étoile	2010	S.League	10	0	0	0	1 (Note: Appearances in the Singapore League Cup)	1	0	0	11	1
Career total			14	0	0	0	1	1	0	0	15	1
