= Moussa Keita =

Guinean footballer

Personal information
- Date of birth: 3 November 1984 (age 42)
- Place of birth: Guinea
- Height: 1.72 m (5 ft 8 in)
- Position: Forward

Senior career*
| Years | Team | Apps | (Gls) |
| 2000 | Tampines Rovers | | |
| 2005–2006 | Perseman Manokwari | | |
| 2008 | Perseman Manokwari | | |
| 2010 | Sengkang Punggol | 3 | (1) |
| 2013 | Persipur Purwodadi | | |
| 2014 | Bintang Jaya Asahan | | |
- * Club domestic league appearances and goals

Moussa Keita (born 3 November 1984) is a Guinean former professional footballer who is last known to have played for Bintang Jaya Asahan of the Indonesian Divisi Utama in 2014.

== Career ==
=== Perseman Manokwari ===
For Keita's unsportsmanlike behavior when Perseman hosted Persigo Gorontalo in the Divisi Utama, the Perseman management expressed irateness towards the striker, adding that he passed to teammates too little.

=== Singapore ===
Added to the Sengkang Punggol squad as the second foreigner for the 2010 S.League and wearing the No. 17 number, Keita recorded his first goal in a pre-season friendly versus Home United, and his first league goal in a 2–2 draw with Etoile before leaving the Cheetahs mid-March with the given reason being “the expiration of his employment pass”.

=== Bintang Jaya ===
Despite the Bintang Jaya management originally agreeing to not add him and Sylla Daouda to their roster in 2014, the Guinean impressed the coach enough to play, regularly featuring on the front for the club by June that year with some promising displays. However, Bintang manager Abdul Rahman Gurning soon criticized Keita for being too aggressive.
