= Kévin Yann =

French footballer (born 1989)

Personal information
- Date of birth: 11 September 1989 (age 37)
- Place of birth: Quimper, France
- Height: 1.82 m (6 ft 0 in)
- Position: Midfielder

Senior career*
Years	Team	Apps	(Gls)
2007–2008	EA Guingamp B		
2008–2009	FC Lorient B		
2010–2011	Etoile FC	28	(4)
2011–2012	Medan Chiefs		
2012–2013	PPSM Sakti Magelang		
2013–2016	AS Plouhinec		
2017	Darwin Olympic SC	15	(2)
- * Club domestic league appearances and goals

Kevin Yann (born 11 September 1989 in Quimper, France) is a French footballer who last played for Darwin Olympic in Australia in 2017.

== Career ==
=== Singapore ===
Assisted by his agent who contacted him with Etoile FC, the first French expatriate football club in Singapore, Yann was subject to a physical test upon arriving in the country, making the team and earning a salary ranging from 1000 to 3000 euros. There, he lifted the 2010 S.League and Singapore League Cup trophies with Etoile, seeking a move to Thailand after the end of the season.

=== Indonesia ===
Going to Indonesia in 2011, Yann stated that he enjoyed the obstreperousness of the fans there, also claiming that the level was much higher than in Singapore and that he was satisfied with his decision to go there with the club providing him housing as well. Despite saying that he wanted a move to a Chinese for Japanese team later on, the French midfielder instead completed a transfer with another Indonesian side, PPSM Sakti Magelang, in 2012. However, PPSM Sakti Magelang soon went into insolvency and Yann was forced to go back to France by summer 2013, deciding to play for amateur outfit AS Plouhinec.

Almost signed for Persijap Jepara in 2013 but the deal never happened.
