= Shota Matsuoka =

Japanese footballer (born 1989)

Personal information
- Date of birth: 22 September 1989 (age 37)
- Place of birth: Kumamoto, Japan
- Height: 1.82 m (6 ft 0 in)
- Position: Defender

Youth career
- 2005–2007: Otsu High School
- 2008: Japan Soccer College

Senior career*
Years	Team	Apps	(Gls)
2009–2010	Albirex Niigata Singapore	37	(1)
2011	Agresso Yamaguchi BS		
2012–2016	Tokyo Lequios BS		
2017–	Aveldage Kumamoto BS		

International career
2018–2019	Japan (beach)		
- * Club domestic league appearances and goals

Shota Matsuoka (松岡 翔太, Matsuoka Shota; born 22 September 1989) is a Japanese former footballer.

== Career statistics ==
=== Club ===
Club	Season	League			National Cup		League Cup		Other		Total	
Club	Season	Division	Apps	Goals	Apps	Goals	Apps	Goals	Apps	Goals	Apps	Goals
Albirex Niigata	2009	S.League	18	0	0	0	0	0	0	0	18	0
Albirex Niigata	2010	S.League	19	1	1 (Note: Appearances in the Singapore Cup)	0	1 (Note: Appearances in the Singapore League Cup)	0	0	0	21	1
Career total			37	1	1	0	1	0	0	0	39	1
