= Kazuki Yoshino =

Japanese footballer

Personal information
- Date of birth: 23 January 1985 (age 41)
- Place of birth: Saitama, Japan
- Height: 1.81 m (5 ft 11 in)
- Position: Defender

Youth career
- Musashiogosekoto HS
- –2008: Seisa Dohto University

Senior career*
Years	Team	Apps	(Gls)
2007-2008	Norbritz Hokkaido		(2)
2009	Albirex Niigata Singapore	10	
2010	Woodlands Wellington	29	(3)
2011	Sisaket		
2011	Blaublitz Akita	6	(0)
2012	Zweigen Kanazawa	3	(0)
2013	Magwe		
2014	Yangon United		

Managerial career
- Japanese schools
- * Club domestic league appearances and goals as of 15:04, 11 December 2019 (UTC)

Kazuki Yoshino (吉野 一基, Yoshino Kazuki; born 23 January 1985) is a Japanese former footballer who was last part of Yangon United of the Myanmar National League in 2014.

== Career ==
=== Singapore ===
Ahead of the 2010 Singaporean S.League, Yoshino swapped Albirex Niigata S for Woodlands Wellington.

=== Thailand ===
Joining Sisaket of the Thai League 2 with Ken Matsumoto in December 2010 following a one-month trial, the Japanese defender was without a club by February 2011, eventually returning to Japan.

=== Myanmar ===
Participating in 2014 AFC Cup matches, including a 5-3 loss to South China AA, with 2013 Myanmar National League titleholders Yangon United in what he described as an exciting experience, Yoshiko set up a charity called World Bond K-Project in 2013 which helps destitute children and orphans in Myanmar through football and donations.

His contract with Yangon United expiring in December 2014, Yoshino retired that month from professional football.

== Career statistics ==
=== Club ===
Club	Season	League			National Cup		League Cup		Continental		Other		Total	
Club	Season	Division	Apps	Goals	Apps	Goals	Apps	Goals	Apps	Goals	Apps	Goals	Apps	Goals
Albirex Niigata	2009	S.League	10	1	0	0	0	0	–		0	0	10	1
Woodlands Wellington	2010	S.League	29	3	1 (Note: Appearances in the Singapore Cup)	0	4 (Note: Appearances in the Singapore League Cup)	0	–		0	0	34	3
Blaublitz Akita	2011	JFL	6	0	1 (Note: Appearances in the Emperor's Cup)	0	–		–		0	0	7	0
Zweigen Kanazawa	2012	JFL	3	0	0	0	–		–		0	0	3	0
Yangon United	2014	Myanmar National League	?	?	0	0	–		5 (Note: Appearances in the AFC Cup)	0	0	0	5	0
Career total			48	4	2	0	4	0	5	0	0	0	59	4
