= Keisuke Matsui =

Japanese footballer

Personal information
- Date of birth: 25 July 1989 (age 37)
- Place of birth: Hyōgo, Japan
- Height: 1.74 m (5 ft 9 in)
- Position: Defender

Youth career
- 2005–2007: Takigawa Daini HS

Senior career*
Years	Team	Apps	(Gls)
2008–2009	Japan Soccer College	10	(0)
2010–2012	Albirex Niigata (S)	70	(3)
- * Club domestic league appearances and goals

Keisuke Matsui (松井 敬佑, Matsui Keisuke; born 25 July 1989) is a Japanese former footballer.

== Career statistics ==
=== Club ===
Club	Season	League			Singapore Cup		League Cup		Other		Total	
Club	Season	Division	Apps	Goals	Apps	Goals	Apps	Goals	Apps	Goals	Apps	Goals
Japan Soccer College	2008	Hokushinetsu Football League Div 2	10	0	–				0	0	10	0
Japan Soccer College	2009	Hokushinetsu Football League Div 2	0	0	–				0	0	0	0
Japan Soccer College	Total		10	0	0	0	0	0	0	0	10	0
Albirex Niigata (S)	2010	S.League	29	2	2	0	1	0	0	0	32	2
Albirex Niigata (S)	2011	S.League	27	1	4	0	3	0	0	0	34	1
Albirex Niigata (S)	2012	S.League	14	0	2	0	3	0	0	0	19	0
Albirex Niigata (S)	Total		70	3	8	0	7	0	0	0	85	3
Career total			80	3	8	0	7	0	0	0	95	3
