= Andrea Damiani =

French footballer (born 1985)

Personal information
- Date of birth: 12 February 1985 (age 41)
- Place of birth: Tarascon, France
- Height: 1.78 m (5 ft 10 in)
- Position: Defender

Team information
- Current team: Valence

Senior career*
| Years | Team | Apps | (Gls) |
| 2003–2005 | Lyon B | 17 | (0) |
| 2005–2006 | Lyon Duchère | 19 | (0) |
| 2006–2007 | Le Pontet | 1 | (0) |
| 2007–2010 | Lyon Duchère | 28 | (0) |
| 2010–2012 | Étoile FC | 35 | (1) |
| 2012– | Valence | 0 | (0) |
- * Club domestic league appearances and goals as of 22:01, 29 June 2012 (UTC)

Andrea Damiani (born 12 February 1985) is a French footballer. He started his career in the youth team at Olympique Lyonnais, where he made several appearances for the reserve team. He then had spells in the French lower leagues with Lyon Duchère and Le Pontet, before moving to Singapore to sign for Étoile FC in 2010. Damiani went on to play 35 league matches for Etoile in two seasons with the club. He joined Valence on 29 June 2012 as the side's ninth signing of the summer transfer window.
