= Peter Tomko =

Slovak footballer (born 1984)

Personal information
- Date of birth: 1 May 1984 (age 42)
- Place of birth: Trebišov, Czechoslovakia
- Height: 1.88 m (6 ft 2 in)
- Position: Striker

Youth career
- Slavoj Trebišov

Senior career*
| Years | Team | Apps | (Gls) |
| 2002–2005 | Ružomberok | 14 | (2) |
| 2006–2007 | Tatran Prešov | | |
| 2007 | Slavoj Trebišov | | |
| 2008 | Sparta Krč | | |
| 2008–2010 | Tatran Liptovský Mikuláš | | |
| 2010–2011 | Geylang United | 30 | (20) |
| 2011–2014 | Tatran Liptovský Mikuláš | | |
| 2012–2014 | → Liptovská Štiavnica (loan) | | |

Managerial career
- 2017–2019: Ružomberok U16
- 2021–2023: Ružomberok (assistant)
- 2023: Ružomberok
- 2023–2024: Ružomberok (assistant)
- 2024-2025: Podbrezová (assistant)
- 2026: FC Baník Ostrava (assistant)
- 2026-: Žilina B
- * Club domestic league appearances and goals

Peter Tomko (born 1 May 1984) is a Slovak football manager and former player.

== Career ==
Tomko was born in Trebišov. He was signed by Geylang United for their 2010 S.League season. He played for Geylang in the 2010 AFC Cup group stage scoring twice, once against Thai Port F.C. in a 2–2 draw, and once against SHB Đà Nẵng F.C. in their final group game which they drew 1–1. He also scored for Geylang in their 2–1 loss to Balestier Khalsa in the 2010 Singapore Cup.
