= Ryan Fante =

Canadian soccer player

Personal information
- Date of birth: February 24, 1986 (age 40)
- Place of birth: Toronto, Ontario, Canada
- Height: 1.80 m (5 ft 11 in)
- Position: Forward

Senior career*
Years	Team	Apps	(Gls)
2006	Hearts Azzurri		
2007'	Toronto FC Reserves	3	(0)
2007	North York Astros		
2008	Vaughan Italia Shooters		
2009	G.S. United		
2010	Sengkang Punggol	7	(1)
2012	Valentine Phoenix	5	(0)
2012–20xx	Khoromkhon FC		
2016	Ulaanbaataryn Unaganuud FC		
2017-2019	Deren FC		
- * Club domestic league appearances and goals

Ryan Fante (born 24 February 1986) is a Canadian former professional soccer player who played as a forward.

== Club career ==
=== Early career ===
Fante played his youth soccer with Sporting de Toronto, a club affiliated with Sporting CP. He would go to Portugal for a trial run with Sporting's youth team. In 2006, he played in Ontario's top amateur circuit with Hearts Azzurri and finished as the division's top goal scorer. The following year he joined Toronto FC's reserve squad that competed in the MLS Reserve League. He would appear in 3 matches in the reserve division. After his brief stint with Toronto's reserve side, he played the remainder of the season in the interprovincial Canadian Soccer League with the North York Astros.

Fante returned to the CSL circuit in 2008 to sign with league rivals Vaughan Italia Shooters. He would help Vaughan secure the divisional title along with a playoff berth. The Shooters would defeat the Brampton Lions in the opening round of the postseason. Their playoff journey would conclude in the next round after a defeat by the Serbian White Eagles. In 2009, he returned to the amateur provincial league to play with local side G.S. United.

=== Singapore ===
Fante sealed a move to Singaporean outfit Sengkang Punggol in 2010. The Canadian then recorded his first start in a 1–0 defeat to Albirex Niigata S and registered his first goal in a 1–1 tie with Beijing Guoan Singapore. His time with Sengkang was mostly limited on the bench and with the reserve team in the Prime League. By mid-season 2010, the club decided to release Fante due to the lack of goals scored. In total, he played in 7 league matches and recorded 1 goal.

=== Australia ===
Around a year after his release from Sengkang Punggol, Fante transferred to Australian semi-pro club Valentine Phoenix FC with Canadians Adrian Butters and Shondell Busby.

=== Mongolia ===
Upon leaving Australia, he ventured to East Asia to play in the Mongolian Premier League with Khoromkhon in June 2012. In his debut season in Mongolia, he helped the club finish as runners-up in the standings and won the Borgio Cup. He returned to Khoromkhon for the 2014 season and helped the club secure the championship by defeating Erchim which also secured a berth in the 2015 AFC Cup.

In 2016, he was transferred to the country's capital Ulaanbaataryn Unaganuud. The following season he was traded to league rivals Deren FC. His final season in the Mongolian circuit was in 2019 when he re-signed with Deren.

== Honours ==
Italia Shooters

- Canadian Soccer League International Division: 2008

Khoromkhon

- Mongolian Premier League: 2014

Individual

- Ontario Soccer League Provincial East Rookie of the Year: 2007
- Ontario Soccer League Central Region East Leading Goal Scorer: 2006
- Hearts Azzurri U18 League Ontario Cp and National Champions: 2004
- Pine Ridge S.S. Sr. Boys Soccer MVP: 2003/04
- Sporting Toronto League Leading Goal Scorer: 1999
- Stadium Newspaper Portuguese Cup MVP: 1998
