= Kazuki Kobayashi =

Japanese footballer

Personal information
- Date of birth: 6 September 1989 (age 37)
- Place of birth: Nagaoka, Niigata, Japan
- Height: 1.80 m (5 ft 11 in)
- Position: Defender

Youth career
- 2005–2007: Teikyo Nagaoka High School

Senior career*
Years	Team	Apps	(Gls)
2008–2009	Japan Soccer College	3	(0)
2010–2011	Albirex Niigata (S)	63	(5)
2012–2013	Nagaoka Billboard		
- * Club domestic league appearances and goals

Kazuki Kobayashi (小林 一貴, Kobayashi Kazuki; born 6 September 1989) is a Japanese former footballer.

== Career statistics ==
=== Club ===
Club	Season	League			Singapore Cup		League Cup		Other		Total	
Club	Season	Division	Apps	Goals	Apps	Goals	Apps	Goals	Apps	Goals	Apps	Goals
Japan Soccer College	2008	Hokushinetsu Football League	2	0	–		–		0	0	2	0
Japan Soccer College	2009	Hokushinetsu Football League	1	0	–		–		0	0	1	0
Japan Soccer College	Total		3	0	0	0	0	0	0	0	3	0
Albirex Niigata (S)	2010	S.League	32	4	3	0	1	0	0	0	36	4
Albirex Niigata (S)	2011	S.League	31	1	5	0	4	1	0	0	40	2
Albirex Niigata (S)	Total		63	5	8	0	5	1	0	0	76	6
Career total			66	5	8	0	5	1	0	0	79	6
