= Julien Delétraz =

French footballer (born 1985)

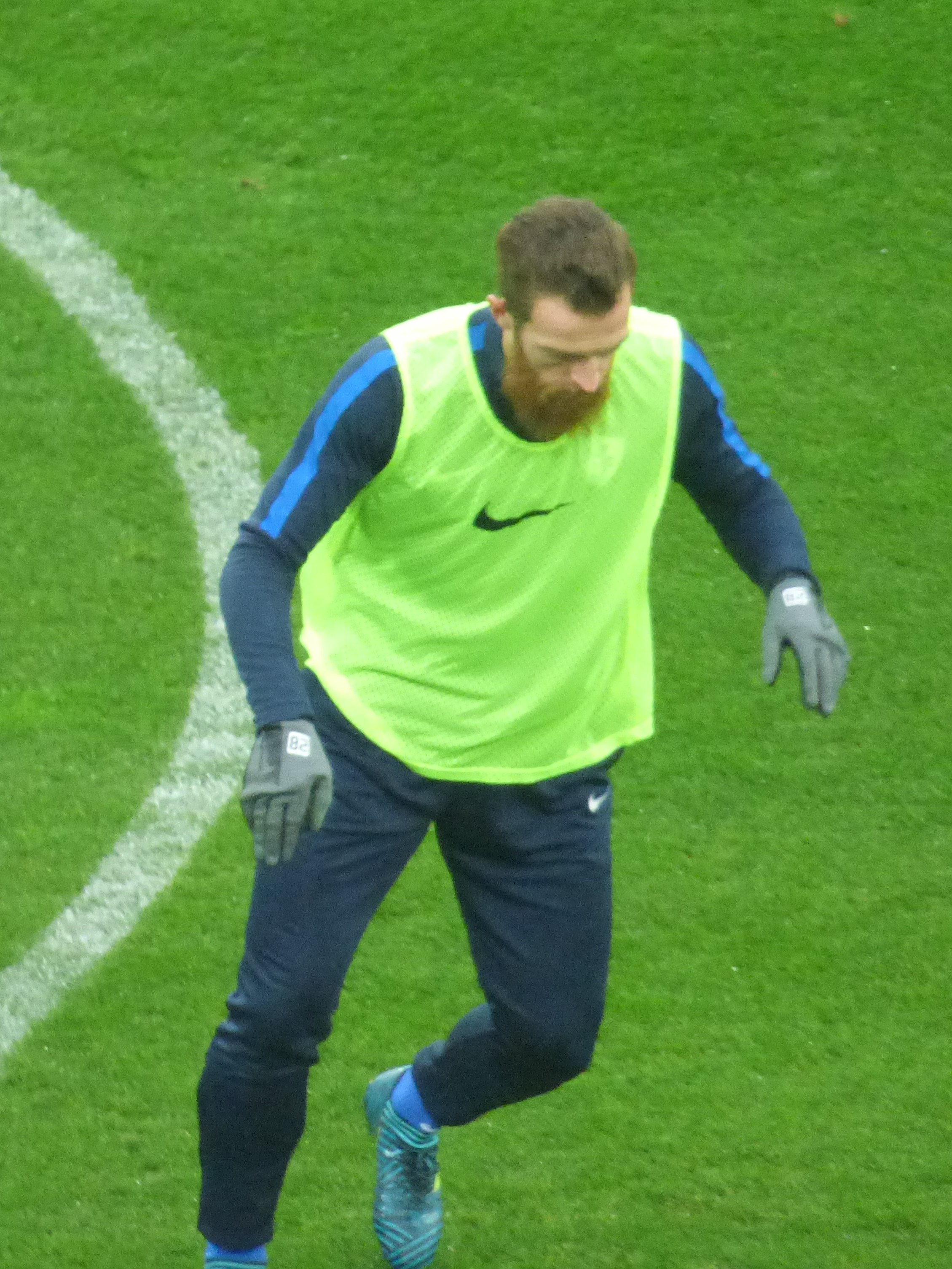
- Delétraz playing for Grenoble in 2018

Personal information
- Full name: Julien Delétraz
- Date of birth: 9 December 1985 (age 40)
- Place of birth: La Tronche, France
- Height: 1.76 m (5 ft 9 in)
- Position: Midfielder

Youth career
- 1997–2005: Grenoble

Senior career*
| Years | Team | Apps | (Gls) |
| 2005–2007 | Grenoble | 4 | (0) |
| 2007–2009 | Tours | 17 | (1) |
| 2010–2011 | Étoile | 30 | (1) |
| 2011–2012 | Rodez | 29 | (2) |
| 2012–2014 | Grenoble | 59 | (2) |
| 2014–2016 | Jura Sud | 55 | (1) |
| 2016–2018 | Grenoble | 58 | (1) |
| 2019–2020 | Cannes | 29 | (2) |
| 2020 | Mandelieu LN | 2 | (0) |
- * Club domestic league appearances and goals as of 19:04, 2 January 2023 (UTC)

Julien Delétraz (born 9 December 1985) is a retired French professional footballer who played as a midfielder.

== Professional career ==
Delétraz is a youth academy product of Grenoble and had 3 stints with the club. He debuted in the Ligue 2 on 20 May 2005 against AS Nancy.

In January 2019, he moved to Cannes.

== Honours ==
- Singapore Premier League: 2010
