= Flavien Michelini =

French footballer (born 1986)

Personal information
- Full name: Flavien Michelini
- Date of birth: 20 July 1986 (age 40)
- Place of birth: Rillieux-la-Pape, France
- Height: 1.72 m (5 ft 8 in)
- Position: Attacking midfielder

Youth career
- Olympique Lyonnais

Senior career*
Years	Team	Apps	(Gls)
2007	FC Gueugnon	1	(0)
2008	AFC Compiègne	12	(2)
2008–2010	SO Romorantin	33	(1)
2010	Étoile FC	33	(4)
2011	FC Gueugnon	9	(0)
2011–2014	Bangkok Glass	53	(4)
2015	Ratchaburi	15	(0)
2015–2016	Bangkok		
2015–2016	Lyon Décines		
2017–2020	Limonest		
2020	Vénissieux		
2021–202?	Charvieu-Chavagneux		
- * Club domestic league appearances and goals as of 23 June 2013

Flavien Michelini (born 20 July 1986) is a French midfielder.

== Honours ==
=== Club ===
Étoile FC

- S.League Champion (1) : 2010
- Singapore League Cup Winner (1) : 2010
