= Loïc Leclercq =

French footballer (born 1988)

Personal information
- Full name: Loïc Pierre Thierry Leclercq
- Date of birth: 23 October 1988 (age 38)
- Place of birth: Armentières, France
- Height: 1.82 m (6 ft 0 in)
- Position: Defender

Senior career*
Years	Team	Apps	(Gls)
-2007–2008	Lille II	0	(0)
2008–2010	JA Armentières		
2010–2011	Étoile FC	29	(2)
2011–2012	R.F.C. Tournai	25	(0)
2012–2013	A.F.C. Tubize	11	(0)
2013	US Marquette		
2013–2014	R.F.C. Tournai	26	(0)
2014–2016	Excelsior AC		
- * Club domestic league appearances and goals

Loïc Pierre Thierry Leclercq (born 23 October 1988) is a French former professional footballer who played as a defender.

== Career ==
After being released from French Ligue 1 club Lille OSC, Leclercq trialled in England before signing for Étoile FC, an all-French team in the Singaporean S.League, helping them win the league and cup. However, he left at the end of the season because his girlfriend was unable to join him.

For the 2012–13 season, Leclercq signed for A.F.C. Tubize in the professional Belgian Second Division, but soon left for amateur French sixth division side US Marquette due to not getting along with the head coach.
