= Murphy Wiredu =

Canadian former soccer player (born 1985)

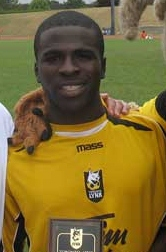
- Murphy Wiredu in 2007

Personal information
- Full name: Murphy Wiredu
- Date of birth: January 15, 1985 (age 41)
- Place of birth: Brampton, Ontario, Canada
- Height: 5 ft 7 in (1.70 m)
- Position: Forward

Youth career
- 2003: CS Azzurri Hearts
- 2004–2008: Saint Peter's College

Senior career*
Years	Team	Apps	(Gls)
2006	Ottawa Fury	5	(2)
2007	Toronto Lynx	16	(10)
2008	Italia Shooters	19	(6)
2009–2010	Sengkang Punggol	46	(11)
- * Club domestic league appearances and goals as of July 11, 2010

Murphy Wiredu (born January 15, 1985) is a Canadian former soccer player who played in the USL Premier Development League, Canadian Soccer League, and the S.League.

== Career ==
He first played soccer at Monsignor Johnson Catholic High School in North York, where he was captain of the soccer team and also earned MVP honours for the volleyball team. In his youth years he played with CS Azzurri Hearts. In 2004, he received a scholarship to play for Saint Peter's College in Jersey City, New Jersey. In his freshman year he led the MAAC in goals with nine, and was named into conference All-Rookie team. In 2006, he was second in scoring for Saint Peters with 9 goals and 3 assists. In his final year at Saint Peter's College (2007–08) Wiredu captained his Division I team to the conference finals where they lost to Loyola as well as to an at-large bid in the NCAA Tournament where they lost to the University of Virginia in the First Round of play. He finished his senior year leading the MAAC once again with 14 goals earning him MAAC offensive player of the year along with MAAC 1st team honors.

When the college soccer season was over he signed for the Ottawa Fury of the Premier Development League where he appeared in five games and notched two goals. In 2007, he signed for the Toronto Lynx, where in his debut season he scored 10 goals in the team’s final nine games. He was awarded the club's Best Offensive Player award for finishing as the team's top goalscorer. He helped the Lynx finish the season with a 6-6-4 record, good for fourth place in the division and only 6 points short of a playoff berth.

The following year he signed with Italia Shooters for the 2008 CSL season. On October 5, 2008 he scored a hat trick against defending champions Toronto Croatia in a 6-1 victory which clinched the International Division title for the Shooters. In the playoff run he contributed by helping the Shooters advance to the semifinals, but unfortunately the Shooters were defeated by eventual champions Serbian White Eagles in the semi-final match. In 2009, he went abroad to Singapore to play with Sengkang Punggol FC in the S.League, for the 2009 season. In July 2010, on the transfer window, he was released from his contract.
