= Karim Boudjema =

French-Algerian footballer (born 1988)

Personal information
- Full name: Karim Boudjema
- Date of birth: 8 September 1988 (age 38)
- Place of birth: Givors, France
- Height: 1.80 m (5 ft 11 in)
- Positions: Midfielder; forward

Team information
- Current team: MO Béjaïa

Youth career
- SO Givors
- Cascol Oullins

Senior career*
Years	Team	Apps	(Gls)
2007–2010	MDA Chasselay	-	(-)
2010–2011	Etoile FC	28	(6)
2011	Othellos Athienou		
2013–	MO Béjaïa		
- * Club domestic league appearances and goals as of 00:00, 22 January 2011 (UTC)

Karim Boudjema (born 8 September 1988 in Lyon) is a French-Algerian footballer. He currently plays for MO Béjaïa in Algerian Ligue Professionnelle 1.

== Honours ==
- Won the Singapore League Cup once with Etoile FC in 2010
- Won the S.League once with Etoile FC in 2010
