= Luka Savić =

Serbian footballer

Personal information
- Date of birth: 2 July 1991 (age 35)
- Place of birth: Belgrade, SFR Yugoslavia
- Height: 1.84 m (6 ft 1/2 in)
- Position: Midfielder

Youth career
- 2000–2003: Partizan
- 2003–2006: Red Star Belgrade

Senior career*
Years	Team	Apps	(Gls)
2006	Barcelona C	0	(0)
2007–2009	Red Star Belgrade	0	(0)
2007–2008	→ Čukarički (loan)	0	(0)
2008–2009	→ Sopot (loan)	12	(0)
2010	Young Lions	28	(3)
2011	SAFFC	7	(0)
2012	Smederevo	0	(0)
2012–2013	Persiba Balikpapan	5	(1)
- * Club domestic league appearances and goals as of 10 March 2021

Luka Savić (born 2 July 1991) is a Serbian retired footballer who played as a midfielder. He primarily played in a central role, but also played in attacking and defensive positions.

== Club career ==
He played for FC Barcelona C in 2006.

In 2012, he joined Persiba Balikpapan before the contract was mutually terminated in May 2013 because of injury problems.
