= Satoshi Hida =

Japanese footballer

Satoshi Hida 飛弾 暁
Personal information
- Full name: Satoshi Hida
- Date of birth: April 18, 1984 (age 42)
- Place of birth: Matsusaka, Mie, Japan
- Height: 1.73 m (5 ft 8 in)
- Position: Midfielder

Youth career
- 2000–2002: Yokkaichi Chuo Technical High School

Senior career*
Years	Team	Apps	(Gls)
2003–2007	Kawasaki Frontale	14	(2)
2008–2009	Vegalta Sendai	9	(0)
2010	Albirex Niigata Singapore	34	(2)
2011–2012	Zweigen Kanazawa	8	(0)
2013–2014	Veertien Kuwana	27	(14)
Total		92	(18)
Medal record
Kawasaki Frontale
Runner-up	J1 League	2006
Runner-up	J.League Cup	2007
- * Club domestic league appearances and goals

Satoshi Hida (飛弾 暁, Hida Satoshi; born April 18, 1984) is a former Japanese football player.

== Club statistics ==
Club performance			League		Cup		League Cup		Continental		Total	
Season	Club	League	Apps	Goals	Apps	Goals	Apps	Goals	Apps	Goals	Apps	Goals
Japan			League		Emperor's Cup		J.League Cup		Asia		Total	
2003	Kawasaki Frontale	J2 League	0	0	0	0	-		-		0	0
2004	Kawasaki Frontale	J2 League	6	1	2	0	-		-		8	1
2005	Kawasaki Frontale	J1 League	1	0	0	0	0	0	-		1	0
2006	Kawasaki Frontale	J1 League	6	1	1	0	2	0	-		9	1
2007	Kawasaki Frontale	J1 League	1	0	0	0	0	0	1	0	2	0
2008	Vegalta Sendai	J2 League	9	0	1	0	-		-		10	0
2009	Vegalta Sendai	J2 League	0	0	1	0	-		-		1	0
Singapore			League		Singapore Cup		League Cup		Asia		Total	
2010	Albirex Niigata Singapore	S. League							-			
Career total			23	2	5	0	2	0	1	0	31	2
