= Mamadou Diallo (footballer, born 1990) =

Guinean footballer

Personal information
- Date of birth: 2 July 1990 (age 36)
- Place of birth: Conakry, Guinea
- Height: 1.71 m (5 ft 7 in)
- Position: Striker

Senior career*
Years	Team	Apps	(Gls)
–2007	AS Ashanti		
2008–2013	Hougang United	109	(23)
- * Club domestic league appearances and goals

Mamadou Diallo (born 2 July 1990) is a Guinean former professional footballer who played as a striker.

== Career ==
When Diallo was seven years old, he was inspired to become a footballer after his brother became a professional footballer in the local league.

He signed a contract with Hougang United FC in 2008. He was able to secure a contract and a work permit to ply his trade in Singapore without any issues. The peak of his career in Singapore football was after a season with Hougang United which won him the Yeo's people choice award for 2013 S league season.

For season 2014, Hougang United FC was ready to offer a contract renewal but he was denied a work permit by the Singapore Ministry of Manpower. Upon hearing this, some Hougang United fans started a petition in 2014 as a last effort to dissuade the Ministry from denying the permit; however, his work permit was denied anyway.
