= Goran Šubara =

Australian soccer player

Personal information
- Full name: Goran Šubara
- Date of birth: 4 April 1987 (age 39)
- Place of birth: Australia
- Height: 1.87 m (6 ft 1 1/2 in)
- Positions: Central defender; defensive midfielder

Youth career
- Bonnyrigg White Eagles

Senior career*
Years	Team	Apps	(Gls)
2005–2008	Bonnyrigg White Eagles	45	(2)
2008–2009	Lautoka	10	(0)
2009–2010	Gombak United	63	(3)
2010–2011	PSM Makassar	25	(1)
2011–2012	Warriors	18	(1)
2012–2013	Balestier Khalsa	22	(0)
2013	Bangkok Glass	25	(2)
2014	T-Team	20	(1)
2015	Police United	23	(1)
2016–2017	Chiang Mai	26	(0)
2017–2018	Sydney Olympic	18	(0)
2018–2022	Bonnyrigg White Eagles	86	(4)
- * Club domestic league appearances and goals as of 10 October 2023

Goran Šubara is an Australian soccer player. He is a versatile footballer who is able to play in the centre of midfield or in defence.

== Club career ==
Šubara showed terrific form for the Bonnyrigg White Eagles in the NSW Super League competition over three seasons managing to secure a 1-year deal with the option of a second year with Gombak United FC.

His ability was further showcased in helping Lautoka F.C. claim victory in the 2008 Inter-District Championship.

Šubara was an important player in his team while playing for PSM Makassar in Indonesia. Problems with the Indonesian FA and a rebel league saw him depart the club and move back to Singapore where his professional career began with Gombak United FC.

He moved to Balestier Khalsa FC after a successful season with the Singapore Armed Forces FC helping them finish in 3rd spot.

== Honours ==
=== Club ===
- Bonnyrigg White Eagles
  - NSW Super League Champions: 2007
  - NSW Super League Premiers: 2008
- Lautoka F.C.
  - Inter-District Championship: 2008
- Bangkok Glass
- Thai FA Cup runner-up: 2013
