= Aliff Shafaein =

Singaporean footballer

Personal information
- Full name: Aliff Shafaein Safiee
- Date of birth: 19 April 1982 (age 44)
- Place of birth: Singapore
- Height: 1.60 m (5 ft 3 in)
- Position: Midfielder

Team information
- Current team: Home United
- Number: 7

Youth career
- 1997–2000: Tampines Rovers

Senior career*
Years	Team	Apps	(Gls)
2000–2011	Tampines Rovers	141	(52)
2012	Tanjong Pagar United	11	(3)
2012	Singapore Armed Forces FC	14	(2)
2013–	Home United	4	(1)

International career^{‡}
2003	Singapore	1	(0)
- * Club domestic league appearances and goals as of 26 June 2009 ‡ National team caps and goals as of 26 June 2009

Aliff Shafaein Safiee (born 19 April 1982) is a Singaporean footballer who plays as a midfielder for S.League club Home United. He can be small but with his brilliant pace and style of play he can be dangerous for defenders. Due to his ball-control skills, he was nicknamed "Romario of the Young Lions". He also had another nickname, "The Little Master".

== International career ==
Aliff was part of the Singapore Under-23 national team.
