= Federico Martínez (footballer, born 1984) =

Uruguayan footballer

Personal information
- Full name: Eduardo Federico Martínez Colombo
- Date of birth: 18 November 1984 (age 41)
- Place of birth: Florida, Uruguay
- Height: 1.91 m (6 ft 3 in)
- Position: Striker

Senior career*
Years	Team	Apps	(Gls)
2002–2004	Rampla Juniors	15	(3)
2005	Defensor Sporting	2	(0)
2006	Rampla Juniors	23	(9)
2007	Central Español	5	(0)
2007–2008	Boca Juniors	0	(0)
2007–2008	→ Rosario Central (loan)	0	(0)
2008	Deportes Antofagasta	14	(3)
2009	Cabofriense	4	(2)
2010–2011	SAFFC	17	(9)
2011–2013	FK Ventspils	70	(20)
2014	Oriente Petrolero	15	(2)
Total		165	(48)
- * Club domestic league appearances and goals

Eduardo Federico Martínez Colombo (born 18 November 1984 in Florida) is an Uruguayan former football player who played as a striker.

== Career ==
Martínez started his career in his native Uruguay where he scored 12 goals in 38 games played with Rampla Juniors. He also had stints with Defensor Sporting (2005) and Central Español (2007) before joining Argentine club Boca Juniors and being loaned out to Rosario Central for the 2007–08 season. He moved to Chilean club Deportes Antofagasta in 2008 where he scored 3 goals in 14 games. Unfortunately, that year the club was relegated to second division. During 2009, he played for Cabofriense of Brazil but left early due to the club's financial situation.

In 2010, he signed with Singapore Armed Forces FC where he scored a total of 12 goals, including 10 in S-League and 2 in AFC Champions League. One of these goals -scored versus Corean champions Suwon Samsung Bluewings was chosen "Goal of the Month" by the Asian fans. In October 2010, he was chosen Player of the Month in S-League; he scored 6 goals in 4 games played with Singapore Armed Forces FC, including scoring goals number 1,000 and 1,001 in the history of the club.

In March, 2011 Martinez moved to Latvia, signing a contract with the Latvian Higher League club FK Ventspils. He scored his first official goal in Latvian Higher League on April 17, 2011, against JFK Olimps/RFS. On November 5, 2011 FK Ventspils won the title of the Latvian Higher League. Martinez, who played as an attacking midfielder, scored 8 goals in 26 games. He helped FK Ventspils win the title and lift the Latvian Football Cup again in 2013. During his spell with FK Ventspils Martinez participated in the UEFA Champions League and the UEFA Europa League matches.

In January 2014 Martinez joined the Liga de Fútbol Profesional Boliviano club Oriente Petrolero.

== Honours ==
- FK Ventspils
  - Latvian Higher League champion (2): 2011, 2013
  - Latvian Cup winner (2): 2010–11, 2012–13
