= Abdelhadi Laakkad =

Moroccan footballer

Personal information
- Full name: Abdelhadi Laakkad
- Date of birth: April 27, 1978 (age 48)
- Place of birth: Safi, Morocco
- Height: 1.80 m (5 ft 11 in)
- Position: Striker

Senior career*
Years	Team	Apps	(Gls)
1995–2000	Olympic Safi	?	
2000–2005	KAC Marrakech	60	(10)
2005–2010	Woodlands Wellington	130	(67)
2008–2009	→ Home United (loan)	32	(20)
2010–2011	Medan Chiefs	30	(13)
2011–2013	Pro Duta	65	(30)
- * Club domestic league appearances and goals

Abdelhadi Laakkad (born 27 April 1977) is a Moroccan retired professional footballer. He played for Pro Duta FC in the Liga Indonesia Premier Division (LPIS). He previously played for Woodlands Wellington in the S.League.

He is the all-time top goalscorer for Woodlands Wellington, whom he played for in the S.League between 2006 and 2008, and again in 2010.

== Playing career ==
=== Woodlands Wellington ===
Laakkad was introduced to the S.League in 2006 when he was signed up from KAC Marrakech as one of Woodlands Wellington's foreigners for the 2006 S.League season.

He proved to be a successful signing as he ended up as the top scorer in the 2006 S.League season, scoring 23 goals in his debut season with the Rams and winning the 2006 S.League Player of the Year Award. During his two seasons with the Rams, Laakkad also won the Tiger Beer Goal Of The Year award in the 2008 S.League season.

In view of his impressive displays, Laakkad was supposed to join Home United during the 2009 off-season but niggling injuries hampered the transfer and it was eventually called off. As a result, he spent a year away from football to recover from his injury.

Laakkad returned to Woodlands Wellington during the 2010 S.League season and achieved two personal milestones during that year. He made his 100th appearance for Woodlands in a match against the Young Lions, in which he also scored a goal to mark the occasion, and also surpassed Agu Casmir's all-time top scorer record by scoring 10 goals in 30 appearances, bringing his total tally to 67 goals in 129 appearances.

=== Medan Chiefs ===
After the 2010 season, Laakkad was released by Woodlands. He would soon join Liga Primer Indonesia side Medan Chiefs, rejoining former Woodlands coach Jörg Steinebruner and teammate Luis Eduardo Hicks in the Netherlands-based club.

== Honours ==
=== Individual ===
- S.League Player of the Year: 2006
- S.League Top Scorer: 2006
- S.League Goal of the Year: 2008
