= Benoît Croissant =

French footballer (born 1980)

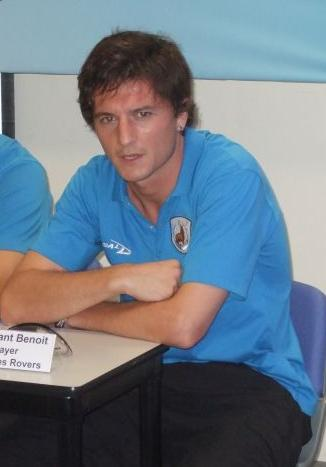
- Croissant in 2009

Personal information
- Date of birth: 9 August 1980 (age 46)
- Place of birth: Vitry-le-François, France
- Height: 1.84 m (6 ft 0 in)
- Position: Centre-back

Youth career
- INF Clairefontaine
- Troyes

Senior career*
Years	Team	Apps	(Gls)
1999–2001	Troyes B	47	(4)
2001–2002	Sheffield United	0	(0)
2002–2003	→ Stormvogels Telstar (loan)	24	(0)
2003–2005	Stormvogels Telstar	28	(0)
2005–2006	Asyut Cement		
2006–2007	Liaoning Whowin		
2007	Indianapolis Braves		
2007–2008	Al-Najma	27	(4)
2009–2012	Tampines Rovers	110	(10)
- * Club domestic league appearances and goals

Benoît Croissant (born 9 August 1980) is a French former professional footballer who played as a centre-back. During his career, he played for eight clubs in eight countries.

== Career ==
Croissant graduated from INF Clairefontaine in 1997, before beginning his career with Troyes AC where he played for the reserves. He moved to England to play with Sheffield United in 2001 but failed to make a competitive appearance for the Blades, and was subsequently loaned to Eerste Divisie club Stormvogels Telstar for the 2002–03 season to gain match experience. In 2003, he transferred to the Dutch side permanently. He was released in 2005 when his contract expired.

He then signed for Egyptian Premier League club Asyut Cement SC, before joining Chinese club Liaoning Whowin. He subsequently changed continents once again, joining Indianapolis Braves.

Croissant then signed for the Bahrain club Al-Najma in June 2007. In August 2007, he scored his first goal with the Bahraini club against Al Wakrah during the Gulf Cup in Abu Dhabi. In his first season with Al-Najma, he won the Bahraini King's Cup, qualifying for the 2008 AFC Cup.

In November 2008, he signed for Tampines Rovers in the Singapore S.League, winning both the S.League and the Singapore Charity Shield in 2011 and 2012 consecutively.

He participated for the second time in the AFC Cup in 2011, scoring in the group stage against Victory Sports Club from the Maldives, before the Rovers were eliminated in the last 16 against Iraqi side Arbil SC in extra time.

== Honours ==
Al-Najma

- Bahraini King's Cup: 2007

Tampines Rovers

- S.League: 2011, 2012
- Singapore Charity Shield: 2011, 2012
