= Anthony Moulin =

French association football player (born 1986)

Personal information
- Date of birth: 4 January 1986 (age 40)
- Place of birth: Le Puy-en-Velay, France
- Height: 1.86 m (6 ft 1 in)
- Position: Defender

Senior career*
| Years | Team | Apps | (Gls) |
| 2010–2011 | Étoile | 41 | (4) |
| 2017– | Colombier | 31 | (1) |
- * Club domestic league appearances and goals

Anthony Jean-Louis Moulin (born 4 January 1986) is a French footballer currently playing for Colombier.

== Career statistics ==
=== Club ===
As of 31 July 2020

| Club | Season | League | | | National Cup | | League Cup | | Other | | Total | |
| Club | Season | Division | Apps | Goals | Apps | Goals | Apps | Goals | Apps | Goals | Apps | Goals |
|---|---|---|---|---|---|---|---|---|---|---|---|---|
| Étoile | 2010 | S.League | 26 | 3 | 5 (Note: Appearances in the Singapore Cup) | 3 | 4 (Note: Appearances in the Singapore League Cup) | 1 | 0 | 0 | 35 | 7 |
| Étoile | 2011 | S.League | 15 | 1 | 1 | 0 | 0 | 0 | 0 | 0 | 16 | 1 |
| Étoile | Total | | 41 | 4 | 6 | 3 | 4 | 1 | 0 | 0 | 51 | 8 |
| Colombier | 2017–18 | 2. Liga Interregional | 18 | 0 | 1 (Note: Appearances in the Swiss Cup qualifiers) | 0 | – | | 0 | 0 | 19 | 0 |
| Colombier | 2018–19 | 2. Liga Interregional | 0 | 0 | 1 | 0 | – | | 0 | 0 | 1 | 0 |
| Colombier | 2019–20 | 2. Liga Interregional | 13 | 1 | 0 | 0 | – | | 0 | 0 | 13 | 1 |
| Colombier | Total | | 31 | 1 | 2 | 0 | 0 | 0 | 0 | 0 | 33 | 1 |
| Career total | | | 72 | 5 | 8 | 3 | 4 | 1 | 0 | 0 | 84 | 9 |
