= Matthias Verschave =

French footballer (born 1977)

Personal information
- Date of birth: 24 December 1977 (age 48)
- Place of birth: Lesquin, France
- Height: 1.75 m (5 ft 9 in)
- Position: Forward

Youth career
- 1991–1999: Paris Saint-Germain

Senior career*
Years	Team	Apps	(Gls)
1999–2003	Paris Saint-Germain B	50	(15)
2001	→ Swansea City (loan)	12	(3)
2001–2002	→ Clermont (loan)	35	(14)
2002–2003	Clermont	17	(2)
2003	→ Reims (loan)	12	(1)
2003–2005	Nîmes	56	(20)
2005–2006	Brest	24	(1)
2006–2007	FC Sete	57	(9)
2008–2009	Olympiakos Nicosia	1	(0)
2010	Etoile FC		
- * Club domestic league appearances and goals

Matthias Verschave (born 24 December 1977) is a French former professional footballer who played as a forward.

== Career ==
Verschave was born in Lesquin. He began his playing career with Paris Saint-Germain, (Note: Matthias Verschave – French league stats at LFP – also available in French (archived)) and played on loan for Football League Second Division side Swansea City and Clermont. He later played for Ligue 2 sides Reims and Breist.
