= 2010 Geylang United FC season =

Geylang United FC
2010 season
- Chairman: Patrick Ang
- Coach: Mike Wong
- Ground: Bedok Stadium
- S.League: 5th
- Singapore Cup: First round
- League Cup: Quarter-finals
- AFC Cup: Group Stage

The 2010 S.League season was Geylang United's 15th season in the top flight of Singapore football and 35th year in existence as a football club. The club also competed in the Singapore League Cup, Singapore Cup and the AFC Cup.

== Squad ==
No.	Name	Nationality	Position (s)	Date of birth (Age as at Season Opener)
Goalkeepers
1	Toh Guo'An	(Singapore)	GK	5 September 1982 (age 27)
19	Yazid Yasin	(Singapore)	GK	24 June 1979 (age 30)
20	Siddiq Durimi	(Singapore)	GK	27 May 1988 (age 21)
Defenders
2	Salim Abdul Rahim	(Singapore)	DF	24 October 1984 (age 25)
4	Sevki Sha'ban	(Singapore)	DF	2 May 1985 (age 24)
5	Walid Lounis	(Singapore)	DF	7 April 1983 (age 26)
12	Adrian Dhanaraj	(Singapore)	DF	9 March 1984 (age 25)
13	Jonathan Xu	(Singapore)	DF	9 July 1983 (age 26)
18	Syed Fadhil	(Singapore)	DF	16 April 1981 (age 28)
Midfielders
3	Rastislav Belicak	(Slovakia)	MF	9 November 1977 (age 32)
8	Vasile Ghindaru	(Romania)	MF	9 May 1978 (age 31)
9	Jae-Hong Kim	(South Korea)	MF	10 August 1984 (age 25)
11	Syed Thaha	(Singapore)	DF	2 May 1985 (age 24)
14	Itimi Dickson	(Singapore)	MF	14 November 1983 (age 26)
15	Shah Hirul	(Singapore)	MF	7 May 1986 (age 23)
16	Yasir Hanapi	(Singapore)	MF	21 June 1989 (age 20)
Forwards
7	Masrezwan Masturi	(Singapore)	FW	17 February 1981 (age 28)
10	Peter Tomko	(Slovakia)	FW	1 May 1984 (age 25)
17	Hafiz Rahim	(Singapore)	FW	19 November 1983 (age 26)

== Pre-Season Transfer ==
=== In ===
Position	Player	Transferred From	Ref
GK	(Singapore) Toh Guo'An	(Singapore) SAFFC	
GK	(Singapore) Siddiq Durimi	(Singapore) Home United	
DF	(Singapore) Salim Abdul Rahim	Free Transfer	
DF	(Singapore) Sevki Sha'ban	(Singapore) Gombak United	
DF	(Singapore) Syed Fadhil	(Singapore) Home United	
MF	(Singapore) Itimi Dickson	(Singapore) Home United	
MF	(Romania) Vasile Ghindaru	(Romania) Concordia Chiajna	
MF	(Singapore) Yasir Hanapi	(Singapore) Geylang United U23	
FW	(Slovakia) Peter Tomko	(Slovakia) Liptovský Mikuláš	

=== Out ===
Position	Player	Transferred To	Ref
GK	(Singapore) Fajar Sarib		
DF	(Singapore) Faizal Senin		
DF	(Japan) Haruki Seto		
MF	(South Korea) Jae-Hong Kim		
MF	(Singapore) Izzudin Rajabally		
MF	(Singapore) G Lenan		
MF	(Singapore) Mohd Noor Ali		
FW	(Singapore) Farhan Farook		
MF	(Singapore) Ashrin Shariff		

== Mid-Season Transfer ==
=== In ===
Position	Player	Transferred From	Ref
MF	(South Korea) Jae-Hong Kim		

=== Out ===
Position	Player	Transferred To	Ref
MF	(Slovakia) Miroslav Latiak	(Slovakia) Liptovský Mikuláš	

== Coaching staff ==
Position	Name
Head coach	(Singapore) Mike Wong
Assistant coach	(Singapore)
Goalkeeping coach	(Singapore)
Team manager	(Singapore) Lim Tong Hai
Physiotherapist	(Singapore)
Kitman	(Singapore) Abdul Halim Yusop

== Pre-season friendlies ==
2 January 2010	(Singapore) Geylang United	1–2	(Singapore) Home United	Bedok Stadium
17:00 (UTC+8)

7 January 2010	(Singapore) SAFFC	5–1	(Singapore) Geylang United	Choa Chu Kang Stadium
17:00 (UTC+8)

11 January 2010	(Singapore) Geylang United	5–0	Singapore Cricket Club	Bedok Stadium
18:00 (UTC+8)

16 January 2010	(Japan) Albirex Niigata Singapore	0–0	(Singapore) Geylang United	Jurong East Stadium
19:45 (UTC+8)

20 January 2010	(Singapore) Young Lions	1–0	(Singapore) Geylang United	Jalan Besar Stadium
17:00 (UTC+8)

23 January 2010	(Singapore) Geylang United	2–3	(Singapore) Woodlands Wellington	Bedok Stadium
17:00 (UTC+8)

26 January 2010	(Singapore) Sengkang Punggol	2–2	(Singapore) Geylang United	Hougang Stadium
17:00 (UTC+8)

== S.League ==
=== Round 1 ===
3 February 2010 1	(Singapore) SAFFC	1–1	(Singapore) Geylang United	Choa Chu Kang Stadium
19:45 (UTC+8)	Taisuke Akiyoshi (yellow card) 30'; Roshan Rail (yellow card) 49'; Indra Sahdan Daud 60' (pen); Hafiz Osman (yellow card) 84'; Ahmad Latiff (yellow card) 90'		Syed Fadhil 44'; Adrian Dhanaraj (yellow card) 90' (yellow-red card); Syed Thaha (yellow card) 76'; Yasir Hanapi (yellow card) 90'	Attendance: 3323; Referee: Abdul Malik Bashir

10 February 2010 2	(Singapore) Geylang United	1–1	(Japan) Albirex Niigata Singapore	Bedok Stadium
19:45 (UTC+8)	Miroslav Latiak (yellow card) 29'; Syed Thaha 79'		Takaya Sugasawa (yellow card) 21'; Satoshi Hida 69'; Shota Matsuoka (yellow card) 74'; Ryuta Hayashi (yellow card) 78'	Attendance: 2439; Referee: Johan Jahari

16 February 2010 3	(Singapore) Young Lions	0–1	(Singapore) Geylang United	Jalan Besar Stadium
19:45 (UTC+8)	Raihan Rahman (yellow card) 32'		Peter Tomko 19'; Vasile Ghindaru (yellow card) 85'	Attendance: 2489; Referee: Muhd Taqi

12 March 2010 4	(Singapore) Geylang United	1–3	(China) Beijing Guoan Talent	Jalan Besar Stadium
19:30 (UTC+8)	Peter Tomko 71'; Syed Thaha (yellow card) 89'		Ma Chongchong (yellow card) 25'; Tan Tiancheng 29' 52'; Zhang Xizhe 90'; Lei Tenglong (yellow card) 87'; Su Boyang (yellow card) 88'	Attendance: 1350; Referee: P Pandian

29 March 2010 5	(France) Étoile	2–2	(Singapore) Geylang United	Queenstown Stadium
19:45 (UTC+8)	Karim Boudjema 28'; Matthias Verschave 58' (pen.)		Vasile Ghindaru (yellow card) 2'; Walid Lounis 11' (yellow card) 65'; Peter Tomko 85'	Attendance: 2017; Referee: Sukhbir Singh

1 April 2010 6	(Singapore) Home United	3–0	(Singapore) Geylang United	Clementi Stadium
19:45 (UTC+8)	Shi Jiayi 7'; Chul-Woo Choi 34'; Firdaus Idros (yellow card) 50' Shariff Samat (yellow card) 73'; Shahril Ishak 83'		Vasile Ghindarul 84'	Attendance: 1032; Referee: Abdul Malik Bashir

10 April 2010 7	(Singapore) Geylang United	1–0	(Singapore) Woodlands Wellington	Bedok Stadium
19:45 (UTC+8)	Syed Thaha (yellow card) 9'; Hafiz Rahim 45'; Rastislav Belicak (yellow card) 80'; ALiff Azmi (yellow card) 90'			Attendance: 1408; Referee: Muhd Taqi

15 April 2010 8	(Singapore) Geylang United	3–2	(Singapore) Hougang United	Bedok Stadium
19:45 (UTC+8)	Hafiz Rahim (yellow card) 34'; Peter Tomko 53' 59' 79'; Syed Fadhil (yellow card) 90'		Nor Azli Yusoff (yellow card) 11'; Sobrie Mazelan 29'; Murphy Wiredu 55'; Faizal Amir (yellow card) 72'	Attendance: 1004; Referee: Johan Jahari

24 April 2010 9	(Singapore) Tampines Rovers	0–1	(Singapore) Geylang United	Tampines Stadium
19:45 (UTC+8)	Khairul Amri (yellow card) 34'; Zahid Ahmad (yellow card) 45' (yellow-red card)		Salim Rahim (yellow card) 42'; Walid Lounis (yellow card) 43'; Jonathan Xu (yellow card) 50'; Yasir Hanapi (yellow card) 56'; Rastislav Belicak (yellow card) 70'; Masturi Masturi 78'	Attendance: 1536; Referee: Abdul Malik

3 May 2010 10	(Japan) Albirex Niigata Singapore	1–2	(Singapore) Geylang United	Jurong East Stadium
19:45 (UTC+8)	Tatsuro Inui 45'; Nobuhiro Uetani 54'; Fumiya Kobayashi 57'; Keisuke Matsui (red card) 70'		Jonathan Xu (yellow card) 22'; Vasile Ghindaru (yellow card) 49'; Rastislav Belicak 85'; Hafiz Rahim 90'	Attendance: 1245; Referee: Muhd Taqi

7 May 2010 11	(Singapore) Geylang United	0–0	(Singapore) Gombak United	Jalan Besar Stadium
19:30 (UTC+8)	Walid Lounis (yellow card) 51'; Jonathan Xu (yellow card) 90'		Obadin Aikhena (yellow card) 37'; Ruhaizad Ismail (yellow card) 69'; Jeremy Chiang (yellow card) 90'; Goran Subara (yellow card) 90' (yellow-red card)	Attendance: 1850; Referee: Sukhbir Singh

=== Round 2 ===
15 May 2010 12	(Singapore) Gombak United	0–2	(Singapore) Geylang United	Toa Payoh Stadium
19:45 (UTC+8)			Syed Fadhil 8'; Masrezwan Masturi (yellow card) 70'; Peter Tomko 80'; Shah Hirul (yellow card) 90'	Attendance: 929; Referee: W.Ravisanthiran

18 May 2010 13	(Singapore) Geylang United	0–0	(Singapore) Young Lions	Bedok Stadium
19:45 (UTC+8)	Salim Rahim (yellow card) 73'; Yasir Hanapi (yellow card) 78'		Haris Harun (yellow card) 30'	Attendance: 1392; Referee: Abdul Malik

22 May 2010 14	(China) Beijing Guoan Talent	0–1	(Singapore) Geylang United	Yishun Stadium
19:45 (UTC+8)	Zhang Ye (yellow card) 56' (yellow-red card)		Peter Tomko 27'; Rastislav Belicak (yellow card) 65'	Attendance: 934; Referee: Johan Jahari

1 June 2010 15	(Singapore) Geylang United	0–3	(Singapore) SAFFC	Bedok Stadium
19:45 (UTC+8)	Itimi Dickson (yellow card) 54' (yellow-red card); Salim Rahim (yellow card) 64'; Adrian Dhanaraj (yellow card) 65'		Mustaqim Manzur 62'; Indra Sahdan 74' 83'	Attendance: 1557; Referee: Johan Jahari

5 June 2010 16	(Singapore) Geylang United	0–1	(France) Étoile	Bedok Stadium
19:45 (UTC+8)	Salim Rahim (yellow card) 72' (yellow-red card)		Serge Souchon-Koguia (yellow card) 28'; Frederic Mendy 57'	Attendance: 1557; Referee: Sukhbir Singh

13 June 2010 17	(Singapore) Woodlands Wellington	0–0	(Singapore) Geylang United	Woodlands Stadium
19:45 (UTC+8)	Sahari Ramli (yellow card) 27'; Mohd Noor Ali (yellow card) 72'		Masrezwan Masturi (yellow card) 74'	Attendance: 1013; Referee: Muhd Taqi

19 June 2010 18	(Singapore) Geylang United	0–3	(Singapore) Home United	Bedok Stadium
19:30 (UTC+8)	Peter Tomko 22'; Walid Lounis (red card) 57'; Salim Rahim 72'		Shahril Ishak 8' (pen) 22' 69'	Stadium: Bedok Stadium; Attendance: 932; Referee: K.Kalimuthu

22 June 2010 19	(Singapore) Hougang United	0–2	(Singapore) Geylang United	Hougang Stadium
19:30 (UTC+8)	Sobrie Mazelan (yellow card) 27'; Shahir Hamzah (yellow card) 86'; Nor Azli Yusoff (yellow card) 88'		Itimi Dickson 1' (yellow card) 1'; Jae-Hong Kim 57' (yellow card) 86'	Attendance: 759; Referee: Abdul Malik

4 July 2010 20	(Singapore) Geylang United	0–0	(Singapore) Tampines Rovers	Jalan Besar Stadium
19:30 (UTC+8)	Adrian Dhanaraj (yellow card) 37'		Yo-Seb Park (yellow card) 30'; Zulkarnaen Zainal (yellow card) 77'	Attendance: 1396; Referee: K.Kalimuthu

9 July 2010 21	(Singapore) Geylang United	0–0	(Singapore) Balestier Khalsa	Bedok Stadium
19:30 (UTC+8)	Jae-Hong Kim (yellow card) 42'; Walid Lounis (yellow card) 90'		Ishak Zainol (yellow card) 36'; Daniel Hammond (yellow card) 68'	Attendance: 792; Referee: Johan Jahari

14 July 2010 22	(Singapore) Gombak United	1–0	(Singapore) Geylang United	Jalan Besar Stadium
19:30 (UTC+8)	Agu Casmir 61'			Attendance: 818; Referee: Abas Daud

=== Round 3 ===
20 July 2010 23	(Singapore) SAFFC	0–2	(Singapore) Geylang United	Choa Chu Kang Stadium
19:30 (UTC+8)	Taisuke Akiyoshi (yellow card) 25'; Ivan Jerkovic 48'; Roshan Rai 77'		Jae-Hong Kim 41'; Adrian Dhanaraj 54'; Peter Tomko 82'	Attendance: 1869; Referee: Leow Thiam Hoe

30 July 2010 24	(Singapore) Geylang United	1–1	(Japan) Albirex Niigata Singapore	Jalan Besar Stadium
19:45 (UTC+8)	Jae-Hong Kim (yellow card) 29'; Rastislav Belicak (yellow card) 44' (goal) 90'; A. Dhanaraj (yellow card) 65'; Peter Tomko (yellow card) 69'		Keisuke Matsui (yellow card) 25'; Atushi Shimono 38'	Attendance: 1131; Referee: Abas Daud

3 August 2010 25	(Singapore) Young Lions	2–2	(Singapore) Geylang United	Jalan Besar Stadium
19:45 (UTC+8)	Izwan Mahbud (yellow card) 31'; Vasile Ghindaru 67' (o.g.); Khairul Nizam 80'		Jae-Hong Kim 19'; Yasir Hanapi 21'	Attendance: 1439; Referee: Abas Daud

7 August 2010 26	(Singapore) Geylang United	3–0	(China) Beijing Guoan Talent	Bedok Stadium
19:45 (UTC+8)	Masrezwan Masturi 3'; Peter Tomko 22'; Itimi Dickson (yellow card) 28'; Ratislav Belicak (yellow card) 73'		Cui Yu (yellow card) 89'; Teng Bin (yellow card) 90'	Attendance: 874; Referee: W.Ravisanthiran

31 August 2010 27	(France) Étoile	1–0	(Singapore) Geylang United	Queenstown Stadium
19:45 (UTC+8)	Karim Boudjema 74'; Kevin Yann (yellow card) 90'		Walid Lounis (yellow card) 48'; Adrian Dhanaraj (yellow card) 73'	Attendance: 907; Referee: Abas Daud

6 September 2010 28	(Singapore) Geylang United	0–1	(Singapore) Woodlands Wellington	Bedok Stadium
19:45 (UTC+8)	Walid Lounis (yellow card) 38'; Rastislav Belicak (yellow card) 64' (yellow-red card); Yasir Hanapi (yellow card) 78'		Mohd Noor Ali 85'	Attendance: 928; Referee: Abdul Malik

14 September 2010 29	(Singapore) Home United	1–0	(Singapore) Geylang United	Clementi Stadium
19:45 (UTC+8)	Jae-Woon Chun 19' (yellow card) 76'		Salim Rahim (yellow card) 17'; Walid Lounis (yellow card) 66'; Adrian Dhanaraj (yellow card) 78'	Attendance: 1117; Referee: Leow Thiam Hoe

29 September 2010 30	(Singapore) Geylang United	4–1	(Singapore) Hougang United	Jalan Besar Stadium
19:30 (UTC+8)	Vasile Ghindaru 15' (yellow card) 65'; Peter Tomko 31'; Jonathan Xu (yellow card) 36'; Jae-Hong Kim 45'; Adrian Dhanaraj (yellow card) 52'; Rastislav Belicak 84'		Mamadou Diallo 88'; Faizal Amir (yellow card) 90' (yellow-red card)	Attendance: 722; Referee: Zaid Hussein

11 October 2010 31	(Singapore) Tampines Rovers	2–1	(Singapore) Geylang United	Tampines Stadium
19:45 (UTC+8)	Seiji Kaneko 69'; Aleksandar Duric 80'		Hafiz Rahim 76' (pen); Peter Tomoko (yellow card) 77'	Attendance: 1313; Referee: Abas Daud

11 October 2010 32	(Singapore) Balestier Khalsa	0–1	(Singapore) Geylang United	Toa Payoh Stadium
19:45 (UTC+8)	K. Vikraman (yellow card) 35'; Goh Swee Swee (yellow card) 41'		Peter Tomoko (yellow card) 12' (goal) 33'; Salim Rahim (yellow card) 73'	Attendance: 865; Referee: Abas Daud

11 October 2010 33	(Singapore) Geylang United	0–0	(Singapore) Gombak United	Bedok Stadium
19:45 (UTC+8)			Bah Mamadou (yellow card) 39' (goal) 33'; Jo-Yoon Jang (yellow card) 65'	Attendance: 964; Referee: Abdul Malik

== Singapore League Cup ==
20 February 2010 First Round	(Singapore) Geylang United	0–0 (a.e.t.) (4–2 p)	(Singapore) Young Lions	Bedok Stadium
19:45	Itimi Dickson (yellow card) 99'; Vasile Ghindaru (yellow card) 112'; Fazly Hasan (yellow card) 114'		Eddie Chang (yellow card) 20'; Eugene Luo (yellow card) 34'; Stanley Ng (yellow card) 90'	Attendance: 792; Referee: Adzhar Adziz
	Penalties
	Peter Tomko (penalty scored); Miroslav Latiak (penalty scored); Jonathan Xu (penalty scored); Itimi Dickson (penalty scored)		(penalty missed) Luka Savic; (penalty scored) Izzdin Shafiq; (penalty scored) Raihan Abdul Rahman; (penalty missed) Fadhil Noh

28 February 2010 Quarter Finals	Geylang United (Singapore)	2–3	(France) Étoile FC	Bedok Stadium
19:45	Syed Thaha (yellow card) 26'; Syed Fadhil (yellow card) 27'; Fazly Hasan 32'; Vasile Ghindaru 41'; Peter Tomko (yellow card) 69'	Report	Matthias Verschave 45' (pen) (yellow card) 51'; Frederic Mendy 72'; Julien Delétraz (yellow card) 73'; Loic Leclercq (yellow card) 74'; Karim Boudjema 77'	Attendance: 1,057; Referee: Abas Daud

== Singapore Cup ==
25 May 2010 First Round	(Singapore) Balestier Khalsa	2–1	(Singapore) Geylang International FC	Toa Payoh Stadium
19:45 GMT+8	K. Vikraman 38' 45'; Fadhil Noh (yellow card) 46'		Vasile Ghindaru (yellow card) 54'; Walid Lounis (yellow card) 62'; Peter Tomko 73'; Masrezwan Masturi (red card) 77'	Attendance: 1821; Referee: Faisal Abas

== AFC Cup ==
24 February 2010 Group Stage (Matchday 1)	(Singapore) Geylang United	1–1	(Hong Kong) Tai Po	Jalan Besar Stadium
19:30 (UTC+8)	Rastislav Belicak 75'	Report	Christian Annan 70'	Attendance: 1,061; Referee: Yu Ming-hsun (Chinese Taipei)

17 March 2010 Group Stage (Matchday 2)	(Vietnam) SHB Đà Nẵng	3–2	(Singapore) Geylang United	Chi Lăng Stadium
16:00 (UTC+7)	Gastón Merlo 40'; Nicolás Hernández 69'; Doan Hung Son 89'	Report	Walid Lounis 18'; Siddiq Durimi 74'	Attendance: 14,000; Referee: Ali Saleem (Maldives)

24 March 2010 Group Stage (Matchday 3)	(Thailand) Thai Port	2–2	(Singapore) Geylang United	Suphachalasai Stadium
18:30 (UTC+7)	Makarom 21'; Soleb 28'	Report	Moise 45' (o.g.); Tomko 49'	Attendance: 5,000; Referee: Mohd Mousa Khalaf (Jordan)

6 April 2010 Group Stage (Matchday 4)	(Singapore) Geylang United	0–1	(Thailand) Thai Port	Jalan Besar Stadium
19:30 (UTC+8)		Report	Ruangparn 58'	Attendance: 1,120; Referee: Hajime Matsuo (Japan)

20 April 2010 Group Stage (Matchday 5)	(Hong Kong) Tai Po	1–1	(Singapore) Geylang United	Tseung Kwan O Sports Ground
20:00 (UTC+8)	Chen Liming 55'	Report	Rahim 14'	Attendance: 474; Referee: Dmitry Mashensev (Kyrgyzstan)

27 April 2010 Group Stage (Matchday 6)	(Singapore) Geylang United	1–1	(Vietnam) SHB Đà Nẵng	Jalan Besar Stadium
19:30 (UTC+8)	Tomko 87'	Report	Merlo 89'	Attendance: 1,076; Referee: Sgt. Win Cho (Myanmar)
