= 2008 Geylang United FC season =

Geylang United FC
2008 season
- Chairman: (Singapore) Patrick Ang
- Coach: (Slovakia) Jozef Herel
- Ground: Bedok Stadium
- S.League: 5th
- Singapore Cup: Round 1
- League Cup: Round 1

The 2008 S.League season was Geylang United's 13th season in the top flight of Singapore football and 33rd year in existence as a football club.

== Overview ==
On 29 September 2007, Jozef Herel took over Lim Tong Hai as Geylang International FC's head coach as Lim was promoted to head of the football division at the club.

== Squad ==
| No. | Name | Nationality | Position (s) | Date of Birth (Age) |
Goalkeepers
| 1 | Amos Boon | (Singapore) | GK | 12 July 1972 (age 54) |
| 19 | Fajar Sarib | (Singapore) | GK | 4 August 1977 (age 49) |
Defenders
| 2 | Noh Rahman | (Singapore) | DF | 2 August 1980 (age 46) |
| 5 | Aide Iskandar | (Singapore) | DF | 28 May 1975 (age 51) |
| 6 | Baihakki Khaizan | (Singapore) | DF | 31 January 1984 (age 42) |
| 12 | Faizal Senin | (Singapore) | DF | 12 January 1982 (age 44) |
| 13 | Jonathan Xu | (Singapore) | DF | 7 September 1983 (age 43) |
| 15 | Fabian Tan | (Singapore) | DF | 25 February 1985 (age 41) |
Midfielders
| 3 | Rastislav Belicak | (Slovakia) | MF | 9 November 1977 (age 48) |
| 4 | Shah Hirul | (Singapore) | MF | 7 May 1986 (age 40) |
| 8 | Mohd Noor Ali | (Singapore) | MF | 16 May 1975 (age 51) |
| 11 | Syed Thaha | (Singapore) | MF | 2 May 1985 (age 41) |
| 17 | Hafiz Rahim | (Singapore) | MF | 19 November 1983 (age 42) |
| 18 | Lau Meng Meng | (Singapore) | MF | 29 May 1983 (age 43) |
Forwards
| 9 | Miroslav Latiak | (Slovakia) | FW | 19 March 1981 (age 45) |
| 10 | Fazrul Nawaz | (Singapore) | FW | 17 April 1985 (age 41) |
| 14 | Luiz Carlos Machado Júnior | (Brazil) | FW | 5 June 1979 (age 47) |
| 16 | Masrezwan Masturi | (Singapore) | FW | 17 February 1981 (age 45) |
| 20 | Rivaldo Costa Amaral Filho | (Brazil) | FW | 8 May 1978 (age 48) |

== Coaching staff ==
| Position | Name |
|---|---|
| Head coach | (Singapore) Jozef Herel |
| Assistant coach | (Singapore) Darimosuvito Tokijan |
| Goalkeeping coach | (Singapore) Koh Chuan Hwee |
| Team manager | (Singapore) Lim Tong Hai |
| Physiotherapist | (Singapore) Thomas Pang Yok Boon |
| Kitman | (Singapore) Abdul Halim Yusop |

== Pre-Season Transfers ==
=== In ===
| Position | Player | Transferred From |
|---|---|---|
| GK | (Singapore) Amos Boon | (Singapore) Sengkang Punggol |
| DF | (Singapore) Baihakki Khaizan | (Singapore) Young Lions |
| DF | (Singapore) Fabian Tan | (Singapore) Young Lions |
| FW | (Singapore) Fazrul Nawaz | (Singapore) Young Lions |
| DF | (Singapore) Faizal Senin | (Singapore) Gombak United |
| MF | (Singapore) Masrezwan Masturi | (Singapore) SAFFC |
| MF | (Singapore) Noor Ali | (Singapore) SAFFC |
| MF | (Singapore) Shah Hirul | (Singapore) Geylang International U21 |
| FW | (Singapore) Farizal Basri | (Singapore) Balestier Khalsa |
| FW | (Brazil) Rivaldo Costa Amaral Filho | (Brazil) Esporte Clube Tupy |
| FW | (Brazil) Luiz Carlos Machado Júnior | (China) Nanchang Bayi |
| MF | (Slovakia) Rastislav Belicak | (Slovakia) MFK Zemplín Michalovce |
| FW | (Slovakia) Miroslav Latiak | (Slovakia) MFK Ružomberok |

=== Out ===
| Position | Player | Transferred to |
|---|---|---|
| GK | (Singapore) Hassan Sunny | (Singapore) Tampines Rovers |
| DF | (Singapore) Abdul Hadi | Released |
| DF | (Singapore) Razaleigh Khalik | (Singapore) SAFFC |
| DF | (Singapore) Dennis Lim | Released |
| MF | (Singapore) Syed Fadhil | (Singapore) Home United |
| MF | (Singapore) Razali Johari | (Singapore) Sengkang Punggol |
| FW | (Brazil) Leopoldino dos Santos | Released |
| MF | (Thailand) Rangsan Vivatchaichok | (Singapore) Provincial Electricity Authority FC |
| MF | (Guinea) Ballamodou Conde | (Australia) Wollongong |
| FW | (Singapore) Fadzuhasny Juraimi | (Singapore) Woodlands Wellington |
| MF | (Morocco) Abdelaziz Dnibi | (Indonesia) PSIS Semarang |

== Pre-season friendlies ==
| 19 February 2008 | (Singapore) Geylang United | 4–0 | (Singapore) Police SA | Bedok Stadium |
| 17:00 (UTC+8) |

| 23 April 2008 | (Singapore) Geylang United | 7–1 | (Singapore) Katong FC | Bedok Stadium |
| 17:00 (UTC+8) |

| 26 January 2008 | (Malaysia) Chinese Recreation Club | 0–5 | (Singapore) Geylang United | CRC Penang Field |
| 19:30 (UTC+8) |

| 27 January 2008 | (Malaysia) Kampung Seronong | 0–1 | (Singapore) Geylang United | USM Field A |
| 17:00 (UTC+8) |

| 31 January 2008 | (Singapore) Geylang United | 4–0 | (Singapore) Admiralty FC | Bedok Stadium |
| 19:00 (UTC+8) |

| 4 February 2008 | (Singapore) Johor FA | 2–3 | (Singapore) Geylang United | Pasir Gudang Stadium |
| 17:00 (UTC+8) |

| 11 February 2008 | (Malaysia) MBJB F.C. | 0–3 | (Singapore) Geylang United | Seri Gelam Stadium |
| 17:00 (UTC+8) |

| 16 February 2008 | (Singapore) Geylang United | 9–0 | (Singapore) Summerville FC | Bedok Stadium |
| 17:00 (UTC+8) |

=== S-League ===
| Match | Date | Home/Away | Opponent team | Score | Scorers |
|---|---|---|---|---|---|
| 1 | February 21, 2008 | Home | Balestier Khalsa | 2–1 | A. Iskandar 49', M. Masturi 70' |
| 2 | February 26, 2008 | Away | SAFFC | 3–1 | M. Masturi 15' |
| 3 | March 3, 2008 | Home | Albirex Niigata (S) | 1–1 | M. Masturi 89' |
| 4 | March 7, 2008 | Away (LIVE) | Super Reds | 1–0 | |
| 5 | March 15, 2008 | Away | Home United | 6–1 | F. Nawaz 70' |
| 6 | March 19, 2008 | Home | Young Lions | 3–2 | F. Nawaz 20', 43', 90' |
| 7 | March 31, 2008 | Away | Gombak United | 3–1 | M. Masturi 58' |
| 8 | April 8, 2008 | Home | Dalian Shide Siwu | 1–3 | M. Masturi 55' |
| 9 | April 11, 2008 | Away (LIVE) | Tampines Rovers | 0–1 | Júnior 35' |
| 10 | April 20, 2008 | Away | Woodlands Wellington | 1–2 | M. Latiak 53', 59' |
| 11 | April 27, 2008 | Home | Sengkang Punggol | 2–0 | M. Latiak 45', F. Nawaz 50' |
| 12 | May 4, 2008 | Home | SAFFC | 2–3 | Júnior 72', M. Masturi 77' |
| 13 | May 20, 2008 | Away | Balestier Khalsa | 2–2 | M. Masturi 6', R. Costa 94' |
| 14 | May 25, 2008 | Away | Albirex Niigata (S) | 1–5 | A. Iskandar 30', M. Masturi 38', R. Costa 45', Júnior 59', N. Ali 78' |
| 15 | June 25, 2008 | Away | Super Reds | 2–1 | M. Latiak 36' |
| 16 | July 1, 2008 | Home | Home United | 1–2 | R. Costa 9' |
| 17 | July 15, 2008 | Away | Young Lions | 0–0 | |
| 18 | July 18, 2008 | Home (LIVE) | Gombak United | 3–1 | A. Iskandar 19', R. Costa 23', F. Nawaz 82' |
| 19 | July 22, 2008 | Home | Tampines Rovers | 0–1 | |
| 20 | July 25, 2008 | Away | Dalian Shide Siwu | 0–1 | R. Costa 49' |
| 21 | August 4, 2008 | Away | Sengkang Punggol | 1–2 | M. Masturi 47', M. Latiak 57' |
| 22 | August 12, 2008 | Home | SAFFC | 2–2 | N. Ali 17', R. Costa 60' |
| 23 | August 27, 2008 | Home | Balestier Khalsa | 2–1 | F. Nawaz 2', N. Ali 56' |
| 24 | September 12, 2008 | Home | Albirex Niigata (S) | 1–1 | F. Nawaz 75' |
| 25 | September 17, 2008 | Away | Super Reds | 2–1 | R. Costa 26'(pen.) |
| 26 | September 25, 2008 | Home | Woodlands Wellington | 4–1 | R. Costa 46', N. Ali 53', M. Latiak 76', M. Masturi 88', |
| 27 | October 3, 2008 | Away (LIVE) | Home United | 3–1 | F. Nawaz 85' |
| 28 | October 9, 2008 | Home | Young Lions | 1–1 | F. Nawaz 57' |

=== Singapore Cup ===
| Match | Date | Round | Home/Away | Opponent team | Score | Scorers |
|---|---|---|---|---|---|---|
| 1 | May 12, 2008 | First Knockout Round | Away | Super Reds | 2–1 | R. Belicak 90' |

=== Singapore League Cup ===
| Match | Date | Round | Home/Away | Opponent team | Score | Scorers |
|---|---|---|---|---|---|---|
| 1 | May 31, 2008 | Singapore League Cup 2008 | Home | Balestier Khalsa | 1–2 | M. Latiak 30' |

== Player seasonal records ==
Competitive matches only. Numbers in brackets indicate appearances made. Updated to games played May 25, 2008.

=== Goalscorers ===
| Rank | Name | S-League | Singapore Cup | Singapore League Cup | Total |
|---|---|---|---|---|---|
| 1 | (Singapore) Masrezwan Masturi | 8 (14) | 0 (1) | 0 (0) | 7 (15) |
| 2 | (Singapore) Fazrul Nawaz | 5 (14) | 0 (1) | 0 (0) | 5 (15) |
| 3 | (Slovenia) Miroslav Latiak | 3 (14) | 0 (1) | 0 (0) | 3 (15) |
| 4 | (Brazil) Júnior | 3 (14) | 0 (1) | 0 (0) | 3 (15) |
| 5 | (Brazil) Rivaldo Costa | 2 (7) | 0 (1) | 0 (0) | 2 (8) |
| 5 | (Singapore) Aide Iskandar | 2 (12) | 0 (1) | 0 (0) | 2 (13) |
| 6 | (Slovenia) Rastislav Belicak | 0 (13) | 1 (1) | 0 (0) | 1 (14) |
| 6 | (Singapore) Noor Ali | 1 (14) | 0 (1) | 0 (0) | 1 (15) |

=== Goals conceded ===
| Rank | Name | S-League | Singapore Cup | Singapore League Cup | Total | Average per game |
|---|---|---|---|---|---|---|
| 1 | (Singapore) Amos Boon | 27 (13) | 2 (1) | 0 (0) | 29 (14) | 2.07 |
| 2 | (Singapore) Fajar Sarib | 1 (1) | 0 (0) | 0 (0) | 1 (1) | 1 |
| 3 | (Singapore) Nazri Sabri | 0 (1) | 0 (0) | 0 (0) | 0 (1) | 0 |

=== Discipline ===
| Rank | Name | S-League | | Singapore Cup | | Singapore League Cup | | Total | | |
| Rank | Name | Yellow card | Red card | Yellow card | Red card | Yellow card | Red card | Yellow card | Red card | Total Cards |
|---|---|---|---|---|---|---|---|---|---|---|
| 1 | (Slovenia) Rastislav Belicak | 6 | 0 | 1 | 0 | 0 | 0 | 7 | 0 | 7 |
| 2 | (Singapore) Noh Rahman | 5 | 0 | 0 | 0 | 0 | 0 | 5 | 0 | 5 |
| 3 | (Singapore) Aide Iskandar | 3 | 1 | 0 | 0 | 0 | 0 | 3 | 1 | 4 |
| 4 | (Singapore) Jonathan Xu | 4 | 0 | 0 | 0 | 0 | 0 | 4 | 0 | 4 |
| 5 | (Singapore) Masrezwan Masturi | 4 | 0 | 0 | 0 | 0 | 0 | 4 | 0 | 4 |
| 6 | (Slovenia) Miroslav Latiak | 3 | 0 | 1 | 0 | 0 | 0 | 4 | 0 | 4 |
| 7 | (Singapore) Farizal Basri | 3 | 0 | 0 | 0 | 0 | 0 | 3 | 0 | 3 |
| 8 | (Singapore) Baihakki Khaizan | 3 | 0 | 0 | 0 | 0 | 0 | 3 | 0 | 3 |
| 9 | (Singapore) Faizal Senin | 2 | 0 | 0 | 0 | 0 | 0 | 2 | 0 | 2 |
| 10 | (Singapore) Noor Ali | 1 | 0 | 0 | 0 | 0 | 0 | 1 | 0 | 1 |
| 11 | (Brazil) Júnior | 1 | 0 | 0 | 0 | 0 | 0 | 1 | 0 | 1 |
| 12 | (Singapore) Fazrul Nawaz | 1 | 0 | 0 | 0 | 0 | 0 | 1 | 0 | 1 |
| 13 | (Singapore) Syed Thaha | 1 | 0 | 0 | 0 | 0 | 0 | 1 | 0 | 1 |
| 14 | (Singapore) Faizal Senin | 1 | 0 | 0 | 0 | 0 | 0 | 1 | 0 | 1 |
| 15 | (Singapore) Rivaldo Costa | 1 | 0 | 0 | 0 | 0 | 0 | 1 | 0 | 1 |
