= 2011 Geylang United FC season =

Geylang United FC
2011 season
- Chairman: (Singapore) Patrick Ang
- Head Coach: (Singapore) Mike Wong
- Ground: Bedok Stadium
- S.League: 8th
- Singapore Cup: First Round
- League Cup: Quarter Finals

The 2011 S.League season was Geylang United's 16th season in the top flight of Singapore football and 36th year in existence as a football club. The club also competed in the Singapore Cup and the Singapore League Cup.

== Squad ==
No.	Name	Nationality	Position (s)	Date of Birth (Age)
Goalkeepers
1	Nazri Sabri	(Singapore)	GK	20 September 1989 (age 37)
19	Yazid Yasin	(Singapore)	GK	24 June 1979 (age 47)
Defenders
2	Salim Abdul Rahim	(Singapore)	DF	24 October 1984 (age 42)
3	Sofiyan Hamid	(Singapore)	DF	18 March 1985 (age 41)
4	Sevki Sha'ban	(Singapore)	DF	2 May 1985 (age 41)
5	Mubarak Ahamad	(Singapore)	DF	9 February 1989 (age 37)
11	Syed Fadhil	(Singapore)	DF	16 April 1981 (age 45)
12	Adrian Dhanaraj	(Singapore)	DF	9 March 1984 (age 42)
13	Jonathan Xu	(Singapore)	DF	9 July 1983 (age 43)
20	Daniel Hammond	(England)	DF	6 April 1985 (age 41)
Midfielders
7	Jeon Byung-guk	(South Korea)	MF	18 August 1987 (age 39)
10	Kim Jae-hong	(South Korea)	MF	10 August 1984 (age 42)
15	Shah Hirul	(Singapore)	MF	7 May 1986 (age 40)
16	Yasir Hanapi	(Singapore)	MF	21 June 1989 (age 37)
18	Syed Thaha	(Singapore)	MF	2 May 1985 (age 41)
Forwards
8	Khalili D'Cruz	(Singapore)	FW	14 August 1991 (age 35)
9	Yuta Nakano	(Japan)	FW	30 August 1989 (age 37)
14	Rizawan Abdullah	(Singapore)	FW	8 April 1987 (age 39)
17	Hafiz Rahim	(Singapore)	FW	19 November 1983 (age 42)

== Coaching staff ==
Position	Name
Head coach	(Singapore) Mike Wong
Assistant coach	(Singapore)
Goalkeeping coach	(Singapore)
Team manager	(Singapore) Lim Tong Hai
Physiotherapist	(Singapore)
Kitman	(Singapore) Abdul Halim Yusop

== Pre-Season Transfers ==
=== In ===
Position	Player	Transferred From	Ref
DF	(Singapore) Sofiyan Hamid	(Singapore) Balestier Khalsa	
DF	(Korea) Joo Ki Hwan	Free Transfer	
FW	(Singapore) Rizawan Abdullah	(Singapore) Woodlands Wellington	
FW	(Korea) Jung-Hee Bong	(Singapore) Gombak United	

=== Out ===
Position	Player	Transferred To	Ref
GK	(Singapore) Toh Guo'An	Released	
GK	(Singapore) Siddiq Durimi	(Singapore) Home United	
DF	(Singapore) Walid Lounis	(Singapore) Gombak United	
MF	(Slovakia) Rastislav Belicak	Released	
MF	(Singapore) Itimi Dickson	(Indonesia) Persidafon Dafonsoro	
FW	(Slovakia) Peter Tomko	Released	

== Mid-Season Transfers ==
=== In ===
Position	Player	Transferred From	Ref
DF	(England) Daniel Hammond	(Singapore) SAFFC	
MF	(Korea) Byung-Euk Jeon	Free Transfer	
FW	(Japan) Yuta Nakano	(Japan) Fagiano Okayama	
FW	(Singapore) Khalili D'Cruz	(Singapore) Young Lions FC	

=== Out ===
Position	Player	Transferred To	Ref
FW	(Singapore) Masrezwan Masturi	(Singapore) Home United	
MF	(Romania) Vasile Ghindaru	(Romania) CSMS Iaşi	
DF	(Korea) Ki-Hwan Joo	(Indonesia) PSPS Pekanbaru	
FW	(Korea) Jung-Hee Bong	(Singapore) Gombak United	

== Pre-season Friendlies ==
30 December 2010 Pre-Season Friendly	(Singapore) Geylang United	0–0	(Singapore) SAFFC	Bedok Stadium
17:00 GMT+8

6 January 2011 Pre-Season Friendly	(Singapore) Woodlands Wellington	0–1	(Singapore) Geylang United	Woodlands Stadium
17:00 GMT+8

9 January 2011 Pre-Season Friendly	(Singapore) Geylang United	13–1	(Malaysia) Revolution FC	Bedok Stadium
17:00 GMT+8

13 January 2011 Pre-Season Friendly	(Singapore) Hougang United	2–0	(Singapore) Geylang United	Hougang Stadium
17:00 GMT+8

16 January 2011 Pre-Season Friendly	(Singapore) Geylang United	3–1	(Malaysia) Pahang FA	Bedok Stadium
17:00 GMT+8

19 January 2011 Pre-Season Friendly	(Malaysia) CIMB Bank	2–6	(Singapore) Geylang United	Jalan Raja Muda Stadium
16:00 GMT+8

20 January 2011 Pre-Season Friendly	(Malaysia) Harimau Muda	2–4	(Singapore) Geylang United	Padang Bukit Jalil
16:00 GMT+8

21 January 2011 Pre-Season Friendly	(Malaysia) Malacca FA	1–2	(Singapore) Geylang United	Padang Tun Fatimah
16:00 GMT+8

27 January 2011 Pre-Season Friendly	(Singapore) Geylang United	2–0	(Singapore) Balestier Khalsa	Bedok Stadium
17:00 GMT+8

31 January 2011 Pre-Season Friendly	(Singapore) Geylang United	1–1	(Singapore) Gombak United	Jurong West Stadium
17:00 GMT+8
