= 2009 Geylang United FC season =

Geylang United FC
2009 season
- Chairman: Patrick Ang
- Coach: Lim Tong Hai
- Ground: Bedok Stadium
- S.League: 5th
- Singapore Cup: Champions
- League Cup: First round

The 2009 S.League season was Geylang United's 14th season in the top flight of Singapore football and 34th year in existence as a football club.

== Squad ==
| No. | Name | Nationality | Position (s) | Date of birth (age) |
Goalkeepers
| 1 | Fajar Sarib | (Singapore) | GK | 4 August 1977 (age 49) |
| 19 | Yazid Yasin | (Singapore) | GK | 24 June 1979 (age 47) |
Defenders
| 2 | Faizal Senin | (Singapore) | DF | 12 January 1982 (age 44) |
| 4 | Kamarulariffin Karim | (Singapore) | DF | 5 March 1984 (age 42) |
| 5 | Walid Lounis | (Singapore) | DF | 14 July 1985 (age 41) |
| 8 | Haruki Seto | (Japan) | DF | 14 March 1978 (age 48) |
| 11 | Syed Thaha | (Singapore) | DF | 2 May 1985 (age 41) |
| 13 | Jonathan Xu | (Singapore) | DF | 9 July 1983 (age 43) |
Midfielders
| 3 | Rastislav Belicak | (Slovakia) | MF | 9 November 1977 (age 49) |
| 9 | Miroslav Latiak | (Slovakia) | MF | 19 March 1981 (age 45) |
| 10 | Kim Jae-hong | (South Korea) | MF | 10 August 1984 (age 42) |
| 12 | Izzudin Rajabally | (Singapore) | MF | 23 May 1985 (age 41) |
| 15 | Shah Hirul | (Singapore) | MF | 7 May 1986 (age 40) |
| 16 | G Lenan | (Singapore) | MF | 26 February 1985 (age 41) |
| 20 | Mohd Noor Ali | (Singapore) | MF | 16 May 1975 (age 51) |
Forwards
| 7 | Masrezwan Masturi | (Singapore) | FW | 17 February 1981 (age 45) |
| 14 | Farhan Farook | (Singapore) | FW | 25 November 1980 (age 45) |
| 17 | Hafiz Rahim | (Singapore) | FW | 19 November 1983 (age 42) |
| 18 | Ashrin Shariff | (Singapore) | FW | 10 October 1982 (age 44) |

== Coaching staff ==
| Position | Name |
|---|---|
| Head coach | (Singapore) Lim Tong Hai |
| Assistant coach | (Singapore) Mike Wong |
| Goalkeeping coach | (Singapore) |
| Team manager | (Singapore) Lim Tong Hai |
| Physiotherapist | (Singapore) |
| Kitman | (Singapore) Abdul Halim Yusop |

== Pre-Season Transfers ==
=== In ===
| Position | Player | Transferred From | Ref |
|---|---|---|---|
| GK | (Singapore) Yazid Yasin | (Singapore) Woodlands Wellington | |
| DF | (Singapore) Faizal Senin | Free Transfer | |
| FW | (Singapore) Ashrin Shariff | (Singapore) SAFFC | |
| DF | (Singapore) Walid Lounis | (Singapore) Home United | |
| DF | (Singapore) Jonathan Xu | Free Transfer | |
| DF | (Japan) Haruki Seto | (Singapore) Balestier Khalsa | |
| MF | (Singapore) G. Lenan | (Singapore) Balestier Khalsa | |
| MF | (Singapore) Farhan Farook | Free Transfer | |
| DF | (Singapore) Kamarulariffin Karim | Free Transfer | |

=== Out ===
| Position | Player | Transferred To | Ref |
|---|---|---|---|
| GK | (Singapore) Amos Boon | (Singapore) Sengkang Punggol | |
| DF | (Singapore) Noh Rahman | (Singapore) Sengkang Punggol | |
| DF | (Singapore) Aide Iskandar | (Singapore) Sengkang Punggol | |
| DF | (Singapore) Fabian Tan | Released | |
| MF | (Singapore) Lau Meng Meng | (Singapore) Sengkang Punggol | |
| FW | (Singapore) Fazrul Nawaz | (Singapore) Gombak United | |
| FW | (Brazil) Luiz Carlos Machado Júnior | Released | |
| FW | (Brazil) Rivaldo Costa Amaral Filho | Released | |

== Mid-Season Transfers ==
=== In ===
| Position | Player | Transferred From | Ref |
|---|---|---|---|
| MF | (South Korea) Kim Jae-hong | Free Transfer | |

=== Out ===
| Position | Player | Transferred To | Ref |
|---|---|---|---|
| DF | (Singapore) Baihakki Khaizan | (Indonesia) Persija Jakarta | |
| DF | (Canada) Rickey Marvin | Released | |
| MF | (Singapore) Izzudin Rajabally | Released | |
