= 2013 Home United FC season =

Home United FC
- Chairman: Koh Siong Ling
- Manager: Lee Lim-Saeng
- S.League: –
Home colours	Away colours

Home United competed in the 2013 S.League and the 2013 Singapore Cup.

== Squad ==
=== S.League squad ===
Squad No.	Name	Nationality	Date of birth (age)	Last Club
Goalkeepers
14	Shahril Jantan	(Singapore)	20 April 1980 (age 46)	Singapore Armed Forces FC
30	Eko Pradana Putra	(Singapore)	14 April 1993 (age 33)	(Singapore) Geylang International
Defenders
2	Haziq Azman	(Singapore)	1 July 1991 (age 35)	(Singapore) Tampines Rovers
3	Sofiyan Hamid	(Singapore)	18 March 1985 (age 41)	(Singapore) Geylang International
4	Juma'at Jantan	(Singapore)	23 February 1984 (age 42)	(Singapore) LionsXII
5	Noh Rahman	(Singapore)	2 August 1980 (age 46)	Singapore Armed Forces FC
6	Sevki Sha’ban	(Singapore)	2 May 1984 (age 42)	(Singapore) LionsXII
8	Ismail Yunos	(Singapore)	24 October 1986 (age 39)	(Singapore) Gombak United
15	Choi Jae-won	(South Korea)	12 March 1990 (age 36)	(South Korea) Mokpo City FC
18	Sirina Camara	(France)	12 April 1991 (age 35)	(Singapore) Etoile FC
24	Redzwan Atan	(Singapore)	7 October 1990 (age 36)	Youth Team
26	Sim Teck Yi	(Singapore)	30 November 1991 (age 34)	(Singapore) Balestier Khalsa
38	Justin Khiang	(Singapore)	16 December 1992 (age 33)	(Singapore) Tanjong Pagar United
Midfielders
7	Aliff Shafaein	(Singapore)	19 April 1982 (age 44)	(Singapore) Tanjong Pagar United
9	Kwon Da-kyung	(South Korea)		(South Korea) Seoul United
10	Hafiz Rahim	(Singapore)	19 November 1983 (age 42)	(Singapore) Gombak United
12	Firdaus Idros	(Singapore)	12 August 1986 (age 40)	(Singapore) Young Lions FC
13	Lee Kwan-woo	(South Korea)	25 February 1978 (age 48)	(South Korea) Suwon Samsung Bluewings
16	Mustaqim Manzur	(Singapore)	28 January 1982 (age 44)	(Singapore) Gombak United
20	Nor Azli Yusoff	(Singapore)	29 April 1983 (age 43)	(Singapore) Hougang United
21	Song Ui-young	(South Korea)	8 November 1993 (age 32)	(South Korea) Suwon FC
27	Syahiran Miswan	(Singapore)	22 January 1994 (age 32)	Youth Team
Strikers
11	Jordan Webb	(Canada)	24 March 1988 (age 38)	(Singapore) Hougang United
17	Masrezwan Masturi	(Singapore)	17 February 1981 (age 45)	(Singapore) Tanjong Pagar United
19	Indra Sahdan	(Singapore)	5 March 1979 (age 47)	(Singapore) Keppel Monaco FC
31	Zulkifli Suzliman	(Singapore)	5 November 1990 (age 35)	(Singapore) Geylang International
36	Nur Hizami	(Singapore)	11 April 1984 (age 42)	Youth Team
Players that left during season
1	Jang Hong-won	(South Korea)	21 May 1990 (age 36)	(South Korea) Bucheon FC 1995
9	Masato Fukui	(Japan)	14 November 1988 (age 37)	(Japan) Gainare Tottori

== Transfers ==
=== Pre-season transfers ===
==== In ====
Position	Player	Transferred From	Ref
GK	(South Korea) Jang Hong-won	(South Korea) Bucheon FC 1995	
GK	(Singapore) Shahril Jantan	(Singapore) Warriors FC	
GK	(Singapore) Eko Pradana Putra	(Singapore) Geylang International	
DF	(Singapore) Juma'at Jantan	(Singapore) LionsXII	
DF	(Singapore) Sevki Sha’ban	(Singapore) LionsXII	
DF	(France) Sirina Camara	(Singapore) Young Lions FC	
DF	(Singapore) Noh Rahman	Singapore Armed Forces FC	
DF	(Singapore) Haziq Azman	(Singapore) Tampines Rovers	
DF	(Singapore) Ismail Yunos	(Singapore) Gombak United	
DF	(Singapore) Sim Teck Yi	(Singapore) Balestier Khalsa	
MF	(South Korea) Lee Kwan-woo	(South Korea) Suwon Samsung Bluewings	
MF	(Singapore) Aliff Shafaein	(Singapore) Tanjong Pagar United	
MF	(Singapore) Mustaqim Manzur	(Singapore) Gombak United	
MF	(Singapore) Hafiz Rahim	(Singapore) Gombak United	
MF	(Singapore) Syahiran Miswan	Promoted	
FW	(Japan) Masato Fukui	(Japan) Gainare Tottori	
FW	(Canada) Jordan Webb	(Singapore) Hougang United	
FW	(Singapore) Nur Hizami	Promoted	

==== Out ====
Position	Player	Transferred From	Ref
GK	(Singapore) Nazri Sabri	(Singapore) Woodlands Wellington	
DF	(Singapore) Jeremy Chiang	(Singapore) Hougang United	
DF	(Japan) Kenji Arai	Retire	
DF	(Central African Republic) Franklin Clovis Anzité	(Thailand) Samutsongkhram F.C.	
MF	(Singapore) Kairuldin Ishak	Retired	
MF	(Singapore) (England) John Wilkinson	(India) Salgaocar F.C.	
MF	(Singapore) Rhysh Roshan Rai	Retired	
MF	(Singapore) Rosman Sulaiman	(Singapore) Woodlands Wellington	
MF	(Singapore) (China) Shi Jiayi	Singapore Armed Forces FC	
FW	(Singapore) (China) Qiu Li	(Singapore) Balestier Khalsa	
FW	(Japan) Shotaro Ihata	(Singapore) Geylang International	
FW	(Guinea-Bissau) (France) Frédéric Mendy	(Portugal) G.D. Estoril Praia	

=== Mid-season transfers ===
==== In ====
Position	Player	Transferred From	Ref
DF	(South Korea) Choi Jae-won	(South Korea) Mokpo City FC	
MF	(South Korea) Kwon Da-kyung	(South Korea) Seoul United FC	

==== Out ====
Position	Player	Transferred To	Ref
GK	(South Korea) Jang Hong-won	Retire	
FW	(Japan) Masato Fukui	(Montenegro) FK Sutjeska Nikšić	

== Team statistics ==
=== Appearances and goals ===
Numbers in parentheses denote appearances as substitute.

No.	Pos.	Player	Sleague		Singapore Cup		League Cup		Total	
No.	Pos.	Player	Apps.	Goals	Apps.	Goals	Apps.	Goals	Apps.	Goals
2	DF	(Singapore) Haziq Azman	5	0	2	0	2	0	9	0
3	DF	(Singapore) Sofiyan Hamid	14	0	4	1	3	0	21	1
4	DF	(Singapore) Juma'at Jantan	16	1	5	0	4	0	25	1
5	DF	(Singapore) Noh Rahman	25	0	5	0	2	0	32	0
6	DF	(Singapore) Sevki Sha’ban	8	0	4	0	0	0	12	0
7	MF	(Singapore) Aliff Shafaein	10	0	1	0	4	3	15	3
8	MF	(Singapore) Ismail Yunos	13	0	6	1	4	2	23	3
9	FW	(South Korea) Kwon Da-kyung	10	2	3	1	0	0	0	0
10	MF	(Singapore) Hafiz Rahim	27	3	6	1	2	0	35	4
11	FW	(Canada) Jordan Webb	24	8	6	0	4	1	34	9
12	MF	(Singapore) Firdaus Idros	24	1	6	0	4	1	34	2
13	MF	(South Korea) Lee Kwan-woo	26	13	5	1	2	0	33	14
14	GK	(Singapore) Shahril Jantan	25	0	6	0	4	0	35	0
15	DF	(South Korea) Choi Jae-won	3	0	3	0	1	0	7	0
16	MF	(Singapore) Mustaqim Manzur	7	0	0	0	0	0	0	0
17	FW	(Singapore) Masrezwan Masturi	25	3	5	3	4	2	34	8
18	DF	(France) Sirina Camara	26	4	6	1	4	1	36	6
19	FW	(Singapore) Indra Sahdan	19	4	3	1	1	0	23	5
20	MF	(Singapore) Nor Azli Yusoff	17	0	1	0	2	0	20	0
21	MF	(South Korea) Song Ui-young	22	2	4	1	3	1	29	4
24	DF	(Singapore) Redzwan Atan	0	0	0	0	0	0	0	0
26	DF	(Singapore) Sim Teck Yi	0	0	0	0	1	0	1	0
27	MF	(Singapore) Syahiran Miswan	4	0	3	0	4	0	11	0
30	GK	(Singapore) Eko Pradana Putra	0	0	0	0	0	0	0	0
31	FW	(Singapore) Zulkifli Suzliman	0	0	0	0	0	0	0	0
36	FW	(Singapore) Nur Hizami	2	0	0	0	0	0	0	0
38	DF	(Singapore) Justin Khiang	0	0	0	0	0	0	0	0
Players who have played this season but had left the club or on loan to other club
1	GK	(South Korea) Jang Hong-won	3	0	0	0	0	0	3	0
9	FW	(Japan) Masato Fukui	13	0	0	0	1	0	14	0

== Competitions ==
=== S.League ===
==== Matches ====
21 February 2013 1	Home United	0–0	DPMM FC	Bishan Stadium
				Referee: Muhd Taqi

1 March 2013 2	Albirex Niigata	2–1	Home United	Jalan Besar Stadium
	Kento Nagasaki 69'; Kento Fukuda 90+1'		Indra Sahdan 65'	Referee: Abdul Malik Bin Abdul Bashir

5 March 2013 3	Home United	0–2	Woodlands Wellington	Bishan Stadium
			Rosman Sulaiman 67'; Khalid Hamdaoui 72'	Referee: W. Ravisanthiran

14 March 2013 4	Tanjong Pagar United	0–3	Home United	Queenstown Stadium
			Jordan Webb 41'; Sirina Camara 54'; Lee Kwan-woo 61'	Referee: Jansen Foo

23 March 2013 5	Geylang International	1–3	Home United	Bedok Stadium
	Yasir Hanapi 32'		Lee Kwan-woo 51'; Song Ui-young 65'; Jordan Webb 75'	Referee: Farhan Muhd

29 March 2013 6	Home United	0–1	Tampines Rovers	Jalan Besar Stadium
			Fahrudin Mustafic 63' (pen.)	Referee: W. Ravisanthiran

4 April 2013 7	Balestier Khalsa	0–4	Home United	Bedok Stadium
	Yasir Hanapi 32'		Song Ui-young 21'; Lee Kwan-woo 55'; Jordan Webb 85'; Hafiz Rahim 90+4' (pen.)	Referee: Leow Thiam Hoe

15 April 2013 8	Home United	1–1	Singapore Armed Forces FC	Bishan Stadium
	Masrezwan Masturi 38'		Ruzaini Zainal 26'	Referee: Ahmad A'Qashah

20 April 2013 9	Harimau Muda B	0–1	Home United	Pasir Gudang Stadium
			Lee Kwan-woo 19' (pen.)	Referee: Muhd Taqi

25 April 2013 10	Young Lions FC	0–2	Home United	Jalan Besar Stadium
			Lee Kwan-woo 4'; Hafiz Rahim 70'	Referee: W. Ravisanthiran

29 April 2013 11	Hougang United	1–0	Home United	Jalan Besar Stadium
	Thomas Beattie (footballer) 52'			Referee: Ahmad A'Qashah

6 May 2013 12	Woodlands Wellington	0–3	Home United	Woodlands Stadium
			Lee Kwan-woo 22'; Sirina Camara 65' 75'	Referee: Jansen Foo

10 May 2013 13	DPMM FC	3–2	Home United	Hassanal Bolkiah National Stadium
	Tales dos Santos 8' 90'; Adi Said 26'		Masrezwan Masturi 9'; Jordan Webb 87'	Referee: Sukhbir Singh

17 May 2013 14	Home United	1–0	Albirex Niigata (S)	Jalan Besar Stadium
	Lee Kwan-woo 42'			Referee: Ahmad A'Qashah

27 June 2013 15	Home United	1–1	Tanjong Pagar United	Jalan Besar Stadium
	Firdaus Idros 59'		Ismaël Benahmed 84'	Referee: Abdul Malik

4 July 2013 16	Home United	2–1	Geylang International	Bishan Stadium
	Lee Kwan-woo 76'; Kwon Da-kyung 80'		Jozef Kapláň 35'	Referee: Jansen Foo

14 July 2013 17	Tampines Rovers	4–1	Home United	Clementi Stadium
	Aleksandar Đurić 1' 58'; Kunihiro Yamashita 51'; Khairul Amri 80'		Indra Sahdan 53'	Referee: Abdul Malik

17 July 2013 18	Home United	1–2	Balestier Khalsa	Bishan Stadium
	Lee Kwan-woo 11' (pen.)		Qiu Li 39'; Paul Cunningham 67'	Referee: Yazeen Buhari

2 August 2013 19	Warriors FC	0–1	Home United	Jalan Besar Stadium
			Lee Kwan-woo 15' (pen.)	Referee: Abdul Malik

26 August 2013 20	Home United	4–0	Harimau Muda B	Jalan Besar Stadium
	Indra Sahdan 43' 53'; Jordan Webb 73'; Osman Yusoff 87' (pen.)			Referee: Jansen Foo

30 August 2013 21	Home United	1–0	Young Lions FC	Bishan Stadium
	Jordan Webb 69'			Referee: W. Ravisanthiran

19 September 2013 22	Home United	0–3	Hougang United	Bishan Stadium
			Fazli Jaffar 31'; Mamadou Diallo 57'; Jerome Baker 76'	Referee: Abdul Malik

19 September 2013 23	Woodlands Wellington	2–3	Home United	Woodlands Stadium
	Moon Soon-ho 8'; Jang Jo-yoon 81'		Masrezwan Masturi 20'; Jordan Webb 71' 75'	Referee: I. Samsuddin

21 October 2013 24	Home United	2–0	Tampines Rovers	Bishan Stadium
	Lee Kwan-woo 71' 90+6' (pen.)			Referee: Sukhbir Singh

25 October 2013 25	Balestier Khalsa	0–1	Home United	Jalan Besar Stadium
			Lee Kwan-woo 74'	Referee: Abdul Malik

30 October 2013 26	Tanjong Pagar United	0–1	Home United	Queenstown Stadium
			Juma'at Jantan 39'	Referee: Farhan Muhd

4 November 2013 27	Home United	3–1	Albirex Niigata (S)	Bishan Stadium
	Kwon Da-Kyung 7'; Hafiz Rahim 23' (pen.); Sirina Camara 76'		Kazuki Sakamoto 17'	Referee: Sukhbir Singh

==== League table ====
Pos	Team	Pld	W	D	L	GF	GA	GD	Pts	Qualification
1	Tampines Rovers	27	17	5	5	59	36	+23	56 (Note: Harimau Muda B were awarded a 3–0 victory against Tampines Rovers as the latter were found guilty of fielding an ineligible player. Tampines Rovers had won the original fixture 1–0.)	Qualification to AFC Champions League Qualifying Round 1 or AFC Cup Group Stage
2	Home United	27	16	3	8	42	25	+17	51	Qualification to AFC Cup Group Stage (Note: Qualified as 2013 Singapore Cup winners.)
3	(Japan) Albirex Niigata (S) (Note: The three foreign clubs – Albirex Niigata (S), DPMM FC and Harimau Muda B – as well as the Football Association of Singapore (FAS) under-23 team, Young Lions, are not eligible for any AFC competition spots.)	27	13	7	7	36	28	+8	46	
4	Balestier Khalsa	27	12	7	8	38	28	+10	43	
5	Woodlands Wellington	27	10	7	10	45	47	−2	37	

Source: RSSSF
Rules for classification: 1) points; 2) goal difference; 3) number of goals scored

=== Singapore Cup ===
28 May 2013 Last 16	Albirex Niigata (S)	2–3 (a.e.t.)	Home United	Jurong East Stadium
	Kazuki Sakamoto 34'; Bruno Suzuki 68'		Masrezwan Masturi 24' 48'; Song Ui-young 117'	Referee: Irwan Samsuddin

23 July 2013 QF Leg 1	Geylang International	0–2	Home United	Bedok Stadium
			Hafiz Rahim 45'; Firdaus Idros 68'	Referee: Farhan Mohd

29 July 2013 QF Leg 2	Home United	3–2	Geylang International	Bishan Stadium
	Ismail Yunos 14'; Firdaus Idros 36'; Indra Sahdan 49'		Stefan Milojević 35'; Jozef Kaplan 71'	Referee: Ahmad A'Qashah

Home United won 5–2 on aggregate.

3 October 2013 SF Leg 1	Balestier Khalsa	0–1	Home United	Toa Payoh Stadium
			Masrezwan Masturi 71'	Referee: W. Ravisanthiran

7 October 2013 SF Leg 2	Home United	1–0	Balestier Khalsa	Jalan Besar Stadium
	Firdaus Idros 67'			Referee: Leow Thiam Hoe

Home United won 2–0 on aggregate.

8 November 2013 Final	Home United	4–1	Tanjong Pagar United	Jalan Besar Stadium
	Sirina Camara 13'; Kwon Dakyung 15'; Lee Kwan-Woo 27'; Sofiyan Abdul Hamid 90+2'		Monsef Zerka 88'	Attendance: 6588; Referee: Abdul Malik

=== Singapore League Cup ===
==== Group A ====
Pos	Team	Pld	W	D	L	GF	GA	GD	Pts
1	Home United (A)	3	3	0	0	10	0	+10	9
2	Woodlands Wellington (A)	3	2	0	1	4	4	0	6
3	(Malaysia) Harimau Muda B	3	1	0	2	2	5	−3	3
4	Admiralty FC	3	0	0	3	3	10	−7	0

Updated to match(es) played on 11 June 2013. Source: sleague.com
Rules for classification: 1) points; 2) goal difference; 3) number of goals scored.
(A) Advance to a further round

===== Matches =====
5 June 2013 First Round	Harimau Muda B (Malaysia)	0–3	Home United	Jalan Besar Stadium, Singapore
19:30 (UTC+8)		Details	54' (pen.) Sirina Camara; 59' Aliff Shafaein; 76' Song Ui-Young	Referee: Irwan Samsuddin

8 June 2013 First Round	Home United	5–0	Admiralty FC	Bishan Stadium, Singapore
19:30 (UTC+8)	Jordan Webb 6'; Ismail Yunos 15' (pen) Firdaus Idros 22'; Masrezwan Masturi 58'; Aliff Shafaein 65'	Details		Referee: Leow Thiam Hoe

11 June 2013 First Round	Home United	2–0	Woodlands Wellington	Bishan Stadium, Singapore
19:30 (UTC+8)	Masrezwan Masturi 42'; Aliff Shafaein 53'	Details		Referee: Farhad Mohd

==== Quarter-finals ====
15 June 2013 Quarter Finals 1	Home United	1–1 (a.e.t.) (7–8 p)	(Japan) Albirex Niigata (S)	Bishan Stadium
19:30 (UTC+8)	Ismail Yunos 14'	Details	Shingo Suzuki 78' (pen.)	Referee: Ahmad A'Qashah

== Foreign players ==
Clubs is to register a combined squad for both the Singapore Premier League (SPL) and the reserve league. The squad must comprise a minimum of 36 to a maximum of 50 players, with at least 25 players being Singaporean, while there is no minimum number of foreign players.

- Players name in **bold** indicates the players were registered during the mid-season transfer window.
- Players name in italics indicates the player were out of squad or left their respective clubs during the mid-season transfer window.
- Players with SPL2 are registered mainly for SPL2 competition.

Team	Players									
FC Jurong	Player 1	Player 2	Player 3	Player 4	Player 5	Player 6	Player 7	Player 8	Player 9	Player 10
FC Jurong	(Japan) Keisuke Honda	(Japan) Kodai Dohi	(Japan) Mizuki Ando	(Japan) Seiya Satsukida	(Japan) Shunsuke Ono	(Japan) Takuma Yamaguchi	(Japan) Toa Suenaga	(South Korea) Kim Yoon-sik	(South Korea) Lee Jae-yong	(South Korea) Lee Jin-woo
FC Jurong	Player 11	Player 12	Player 13	Player 14	Player 15	Player 16	Player 17	Player 18	Former players	
FC Jurong	(South Korea) Seo Seung-woo	(Japan) Nozomi Ozawa								
Balestier Khalsa	Player 1	Player 2	Player 3	Player 4	Player 5	Player 6	Player 7	Player 8	Player 9	Player 10
Balestier Khalsa	(Croatia) Jakov Katuša	(Croatia) Marin Kuzminski	(Croatia) Mario Mustapić	(Croatia) Tin Matić	(Japan) Jun Kobayashi	(Japan) Yushin Otake	(Japan) Hiro Mizuguchi			
Balestier Khalsa	Player 11	Player 12	Player 13	Player 14	Player 15	Player 16	Player 17	Player 18	Former players	
Geylang International	Player 1	Player 2	Player 3	Player 4	Player 5	Player 6	Player 7	Player 8	Player 9	Player 10
Geylang International	(Japan) Kaisei Ogawa	(Japan) Naoki Yoshioka	(Japan) Ryoya Taniguchi	(South Korea) Cho Eun-su	(North Korea) Kim Tae-uk	(North Korea) Ryang Hyon-ju	(Montenegro) Dejan Račić	(Philippines) Diego Aspiras	(Serbia) Miloš Čupić	
Geylang International	Player 11	Player 12	Player 13	Player 14	Player 15	Player 16	Player 17	Player 18	Former players	
Geylang International	(Australia) Arihaan Bose (SPL2)	(United States) Daniel Serrano (SPL2)	(United States) Milan Landreman (SPL2)							
Hougang United	Player 1	Player 2	Player 3	Player 4	Player 5	Player 6	Player 7	Player 8	Player 9	Player 10
Hougang United	(Belgium) Ayman Kassimi	(Brazil) Lucas Cardoso	(Ecuador) Washington Jaramillo	(England) Oakley Cannonier	(England) Sam Billington	(France) Mahamé Siby	(Japan) Arya Igami Tarhani	(Japan) Koki Kawachi	(Japan) Takahiro Koga	(Montenegro) Miloš Drinčić
Hougang United	Player 11	Player 12	Player 13	Player 14	Player 15	Player 16	Player 17	Player 18	Former players	
Hougang United	(Scotland) Connor Flynn-Gillespie	(Thailand) Natthakit Phosri	(Thailand) Phutanet Somjit	(Malaysia) Lin Ze Hao (SPL2)	(China) Jiang Zi An (SPL2)					
Lion City Sailors	Player 1	Player 2	Player 3	Player 4	Player 5	Player 6	Player 7	Player 8	Player 9	Player 10
Lion City Sailors	(Australia) Bailey Wright	(Brazil) Hugo Gomes	(Brazil) Victor Aznar	(Croatia) Antonio Mance	(Croatia) Ivan Sušak	(Croatia) Toni Datković	(France) Giovanni Haag	(Germany) Lennart Thy	(Germany) Tsiy-William Ndenge	(Georgia (country)) Jorge Karseladze
Lion City Sailors	Player 11	Player 12	Player 13	Player 14	Player 15	Player 16	Player 17	Player 18	Player 19	Former players
Lion City Sailors	(Guadeloupe) Matthias Phaëton	(Netherlands) Bart Ramselaar	(Netherlands) Bobby Adekanye	(Portugal) Diogo Costa	(Nepal) Namsang Rai (SPL2)	(Lithuania) Algirdas Karlonas (SPL2)	(Chinese Taipei) Jasper Chen Hong-An (SPL2)	(India) Aaditya Aprameya (SPL2)	(Australia) Hugh Alexander Lobsey (SPL2)	
Tampines Rovers	Player 1	Player 2	Player 3	Player 4	Player 5	Player 6	Player 7	Player 8	Player 9	Player 10
Tampines Rovers	(Australia) Dylan Fox	(Japan) Hide Higashikawa	(Japan) Kenshin Yamazaki	(Japan) Koya Kazama	(Japan) Takeshi Yoshimoto	(Japan) Seiga Sumi	(Japan) Shodai Yokoyama	(Japan) Yuki Kobayashi	(Japan) Yuma Kimura	
Tampines Rovers	Player 11	Player 12	Player 13	Player 14	Player 15	Player 16	Player 17	Player 18	Former players	
Tampines Rovers									(Japan) Seia Kunori	
Tanjong Pagar United	Player 1	Player 2	Player 3	Player 4	Player 5	Player 6	Player 7	Player 8	Player 9	Player 10
Tanjong Pagar United	(China) Yue Liantian	(Spain) Aitor Mujica	(Equatorial Guinea) Álex Masogo	(Equatorial Guinea) Marvin Anieboh	(Japan) Riku Fukashiro	(Japan) Masahiro Sugita	(Japan) Yuki Aizu	(Montenegro) Boris Kopitović	(Serbia) Lazar Vujanić	
Tanjong Pagar United	Player 11	Player 12	Player 13	Player 14	Player 15	Player 16	Player 17	Player 18	Former players	
Tanjong Pagar United	(Croatia) Vinnie Ucchino (SPL2)	(Finland) Miro Valio Jai (SPL2)	(Norway) Nils Carballeira (SPL2)	(Malaysia) Deshan Gunasegara (SPL2)	(Philippines) Neil Charles Callanta (SPL2)					
Young Lions FC	Player 1	Player 2	Player 3	Player 4	Player 5	Player 6	Player 7	Player 8	Player 9	Player 10
Young Lions FC	(Japan) Daisuke Sakai	(Japan) Hisatoshi Nishido	(Japan) Miyu Sato	(Japan) Shuya Yamashita	(Japan) Toi Kagami	(Slovenia) Benjamin Žerak	(Wales) Kai Whitmore			
Young Lions FC	Player 11	Player 12	Player 13	Player 14	Player 15	Player 16	Player 17	Player 18	Former players	
