= 2014 Home United FC season =

Home United FC
- Chairman: Koh Siong Ling
- Manager: Lee Lim-Saeng
- S.League: 4th
Home colours	Away colours

The 2014 Home United FC season was the 19th season Home United played competed in the S.League. The team also competed in the 2014 Singapore Cup, losing in the finals to Balestier Khalsa 1–3.

== Squad ==
=== S.League squad ===
Squad No.	Name	Nationality	Date of birth (age)	Last club
Goalkeepers
1	Daniel Ong	(Singapore)	31 January 1989 (age 37)	(Singapore) Balestier Khalsa
14	Shahril Jantan	(Singapore)	20 April 1980 (age 46)	Singapore Armed Forces FC
22	Farhan Amin	(Singapore)	1 January 1990 (age 36)	(Singapore) Geylang International
Defenders
2	Redzwan Atan	(Singapore)	7 October 1990 (age 36)	Youth Team
4	Juma'at Jantan	(Singapore)	23 February 1984 (age 42)	(Singapore) LionsXII
5	Noh Rahman	(Singapore)	2 August 1980 (age 46)	Singapore Armed Forces FC
6	Sevki Sha’ban	(Singapore)	2 May 1984 (age 42)	(Singapore) LionsXII
8	Ismail Yunos	(Singapore)	24 October 1986 (age 40)	(Singapore) Gombak United
18	Sirina Camara	(France)	12 April 1991 (age 35)	(Singapore) Etoile FC
21	Precious Emuejeraye	(Singapore) (Nigeria)	21 March 1983 (age 43)	(Indonesia) Persidafon Dafonsoro
38	Justin Khiang	(Singapore)	16 December 1992 (age 33)	(Singapore) Tanjong Pagar United
Midfielders
9	Kwon Da-kyung	(South Korea)		(South Korea) Seoul United
10	Yasir Hanapi	(Singapore)	21 June 1989 (age 37)	(Singapore) Geylang International
11	Izzdin Shafiq	(Singapore)	14 December 1990 (age 35)	(Singapore) LionsXII
12	Song In-young	(South Korea)	7 January 1990 (age 36)	(South Korea) Suwon FC
13	Lee Kwan-woo	(South Korea)	25 February 1978 (age 48)	(South Korea) Suwon Samsung Bluewings
23	Song Ui-young	(South Korea)	8 November 1993 (age 33)	(South Korea) Suwon FC
27	Syahiran Miswan	(Singapore)	22 January 1994 (age 32)	Youth Team
Strikers
3	Zulkifli Suzliman	(Singapore)	5 November 1990 (age 36)	(Singapore) Geylang International
7	Bruno Castanheira	(Japan) (Brazil)	20 May 1990 (age 36)	(Singapore) Albirex Niigata (S)
16	Qiu Li	(Singapore) (China)	6 June 1981 (age 45)	(Singapore) Balestier Khalsa
17	Fazrul Nawaz	(Singapore)	17 April 1985 (age 41)	(Singapore) LionsXII
19	Indra Sahdan	(Singapore)	5 March 1979 (age 47)	(Singapore) Keppel Monaco FC
20	Ahmed Fahmie	(Singapore)	20 April 1987 (age 39)	(Singapore) Tampines Rovers
25	Muhammad Yusuf Chatyawan	(Indonesia)	April 25, 1993 (age 33)	(Indonesia) Persib Bandung
Players that left during season
8	Masrezwan Masturi	(Singapore)	17 February 1981 (age 45)	(Singapore) Tanjong Pagar United

== Transfers ==
=== Pre-season transfers ===
==== In ====
Position	Player	Transferred From	Ref
GK	(Singapore) Daniel Ong	(Singapore) Balestier Khalsa	
DF	(Singapore) (Nigeria) Precious Emuejeraye	(Indonesia) Persidafon Dafonsoro	
MF	(Singapore) Izzdin Shafiq	(Singapore) LionsXII	
MF	(Singapore) Yasir Hanapi	(Singapore) Geylang International	
FW	(Singapore) (China) Qiu Li	(Singapore) Balestier Khalsa	
FW	(Singapore) Fazrul Nawaz	(Malaysia) Sabah FA	
FW	(Singapore) Ahmed Fahmie	(Singapore) Tampines Rovers	
FW	(Brazil) (Japan) Bruno Castanheira	(Singapore) Albirex Niigata (S)	

==== Out ====
Position	Player	Transferred From	Ref
GK	(Singapore) Eko Pradana Putra	(Singapore)	
DF	(Singapore) Haziq Azman		
DF	(Singapore) Sofiyan Hamid	(Singapore) Balestier Khalsa	
DF	(South Korea) Choi Jae-won	(South Korea) Gimpo FC	
MF	(Singapore) Aliff Shafaein	(Singapore) Geylang International	
MF	(Singapore) Firdaus Idros	(Singapore) Tanjong Pagar United	
MF	(Singapore) Mustaqim Manzur	(Singapore) Geylang International	
MF	(Singapore) Nor Azli Yusoff	(Singapore) Tanjong Pagar United	
FW	(Canada) Jordan Webb	(Singapore) Young Lions FC	

=== Mid-season transfers ===
==== In ====
Position	Player	Transferred From	Ref

==== Out ====
Position	Player	Transferred To	Ref
FW	(Singapore) Masrezwan Masturi	(Singapore) Tanjong Pagar United	

== Team statistics ==
=== Appearances and goals ===
Numbers in parentheses denote appearances as substitute.

No.	Pos.	Player	Sleague		Singapore Cup		League Cup		Total	
No.	Pos.	Player	Apps.	Goals	Apps.	Goals	Apps.	Goals	Apps.	Goals

== Competitions ==
=== S.League ===
==== League table ====
Pos	Team	Pld	W	D	L	GF	GA	GD	Pts	Qualification
2	(Brunei) DPMM FC (Note: The three foreign clubs – Albirex Niigata (S), DPMM FC and Harimau Muda B – as well as the Football Association of Singapore (FAS) under-23 team, Young Lions, are not eligible for any AFC competition spots.)	27	15	5	7	63	30	+33	50	
3	Tampines Rovers	27	14	7	6	44	32	+12	49	
4	Home United	27	13	5	9	52	41	+11	44	
5	(Japan) Albirex Niigata (S)	27	13	5	9	51	40	+11	44	
6	Balestier Khalsa	27	11	7	9	46	34	+12	40	Qualification to AFC Cup Group Stage (Note: Qualified as 2014 Singapore Cup winners.)

Source: RSSSF
Rules for classification: 1) points; 2) goal difference; 3) number of goals scored

=== Singapore Cup ===
30 May 2014 Preliminary Round	Home United	5–0	Nagaworld FC	Jalan Besar Stadium
	Indra Sahdan 21'; Lee Kwan-woo 32' (pen.); Fazrul Nawaz 45'; Ahmed Fahmie 80'; Fazli Ayob 85'

30 June 2014 QF Leg 1	Home United	2–0	Loyola Sparks	Bishan Stadium
	Qiu Li 62'; Yasir Hanapi 66'			Referee: Jansen Foo

3 July 2014 QF Leg 2	Loyola Sparks	1–2	Home United	Jalan Besar Stadium
	Phil Younghusband 58'		Lee Kwan-woo 20' (pen.); Qiu Li 27'	Referee: Jansen Foo

Home United won 4–1 on aggregate.

23 September 2014 SF Leg 1	DPMM FC	1–1	Home United	Jalan Besar Stadium
	Roy O'Donovan 75'		Lee Kwan-woo 37' (pen.)	Referee: Jansen Foo

26 September 2014 SF Leg 2	Home United	3–2	DPMM FC	Jalan Besar Stadium
	Sirina Camara 45'; Noh Rahman 64'; Song Ui-young 89'		Roy O'Donovan 5'; Rodrigo Tosi 35' (pen.)	Referee: Jansen Foo

Home United won 4–3 on aggregate.

7 November 2014 Final	Home United	1–3	Balestier Khalsa	Jalan Besar Stadium
	Sirina Camara 90'		Goran Ljubojević 15'; Kim Min-ho 28' (pen.); Park Kang-jin 89'	Referee: Muhammad Taqi

=== Singapore League Cup ===
==== Group A ====
Pos	Team	Pld	W	D	L	GF	GA	GD	Pts
1	Home United (A)	3	3	0	0	10	0	+10	9
2	Woodlands Wellington (A)	3	2	0	1	4	4	0	6
3	(Malaysia) Harimau Muda B	3	1	0	2	2	5	−3	3
4	Admiralty FC	3	0	0	3	3	10	−7	0

Updated to match(es) played on 11 June 2013. Source: sleague.com
Rules for classification: 1) points; 2) goal difference; 3) number of goals scored.
(A) Advance to a further round

===== Matches =====
8 July 2014	Woodlands Wellington	1–6	Home United	Woodlands Stadium
20:00	Chang 6'	Report	Lee 34'; Qiu Li 46'; Kwon 54'; Hanapi 70'; Castanheira 72'; Indra 85'	Referee: Jansen Foo (SIN)

14 July 2014	Home United	2–0	Singapore Recreation Club	Bishan Stadium
20:00	Camara 42' (pen.); Fazli 43'	Report		Referee: W. Ravisanthiran (SIN)

==== Quarter-finals ====
17 July 2014	Home United	1–2	Hougang United	Bishan Stadium
20:00	Lee 17'	Report	Geison 83' (pen.); Nurhilmi 86'	Referee: Ahmad A'Qashah (SIN)
