= Dennis Lim =

Dennis Lim may refer to:

- Dennis Lim (footballer) (fl. 2000s), Singaporean footballer
- Dennis Lim (film curator) (born 1973), New York-based film curator
