= Jozef Herel =

Slovak football coach (1951–2013)

- Herel in 2012

Personal information
- Date of birth: 22 October 1951
- Place of birth: Planá, Czechoslovakia
- Date of death: 5 July 2013 (aged 61)
- Place of death: Slovakia

Managerial career
- Years: Team
- 1992–1993: Negeri Sembilan
- 1994–1996: Perlis F.A.
- 2002–2003: Pakistan
- 2002: Pakistan U23
- 2005–2008: Penang
- 2008: Geylang United
- 2012: Ayeyawady United

Jozef Herel (22 October 1951 – 5 July 2013) was a Slovak football manager.

== Playing career ==
Herel played first division football in Czechoslovakia from 1970 to 1975.

== Coaching career ==
He became a coach and went to Malaysia to work as the chief coach of the Malaysian first division from 1992 to 1995. He then spent a season as manager of a club in the Maldives in 1999.

From 2000, he worked as the chief coach of the Slovak first division, until he was headhunted by the AFC to become Pakistan national team head coach from January 2002 to March 2003. He also served as head coach of the Pakistan under-23 for the 2002 Asian Games.

On 24 October 2005, he was appointed as manager of the Malaysian club Penang. He was replaced in 2008 by Mohd. Bakar.

On 29 September 2007, Herelz took over Lim Tong Hai as Geylang International FC's head coach.

He also coached Ayeyawady United in Myanmar in 2012.

== Personal life ==
Herel died on 5 July 2013 in Slovakia.

Sporting positions
Preceded by (England) John Layton	Pakistan national football team manager 2002-2003	Succeeded by (Pakistan) Tariq Lutfi
