= Jang Hong-won =

South Korean football player (born 1990)

Personal information
- Date of birth: 21 May 1990 (age 36)
- Position: Goalkeeper

Youth career
- –2011: Ajou University
- 2012: Bucheon FC 1995

Senior career*
Years	Team	Apps	(Gls)
2013	Home United	3	(0)
- * Club domestic league appearances and goals

- Jang Hong-won
- Hangul: 장홍원
- RR: Jang Hongwon
- MR: Chang Hongwŏn

Jang Hong-won (Korean: 장홍원; born 21 May 1990) is a South Korean former footballer.

== Career statistics ==
=== Club ===
Club	Season	League			National Cup		League Cup		Other		Total	
Club	Season	Division	Apps	Goals	Apps	Goals	Apps	Goals	Apps	Goals	Apps	Goals
Home United	2013	S.League	3	0	0	0	0	0	0	0	3	0
Career total			3	0	0	0	0	0	0	0	3	0
