= Rivaldo Costa =

Brazilian footballer (born 1978)

Personal information
- Full name: Rivaldo Costa Amaral Filho
- Date of birth: May 8, 1978 (age 48)
- Place of birth: Vila Velha, Brazil
- Height: 1.83 m (6 ft 0 in)
- Position: Forward

Youth career
- 1994–1998: Botafogo F.R.

Senior career*
Years	Team	Apps	(Gls)
1998–1999	Araçatuba-SP	?	(?)
2000–2001	Deportivo de La Coruña B	?	(?)
2001	Rio Ave F.C.	?	(?)
2002	F.C. Forlì	?	(?)
2002–2003	Al Taawon	?	(?)
2003	Petrokimia Putra	16	(7)
2004	Arema Malang	25	(12)
2005	Bonsucesso F.C.	?	(?)
2006	Desportiva Capixaba	?	(?)
2007	Deportivo Marquense	?	(?)
2007	Esporte Clube Tupy	?	(?)
2008	Geylang United	21	(5)
2009	??		
2010	Balestier Khalsa FC		
- * Club domestic league appearances and goals as of May 20, 2008

Rivaldo Costa Amaral Filho, or simply Rivaldo Costa (born May 8, 1978), is a retired Brazilian footballer who played as a forward.

== Club career ==
Rivaldo Costa is a typical 'journeyman', having played for at least a dozen clubs in his career, most notably Deportivo de La Coruña of Spain, where he played for the "B" side in the Segunda División B.

=== Brazil ===
As a youth player with Botafogo F.R., Rivaldo Costa was the 1995 Campeonato Carioca de Juniores (Rio de Janeiro Youth Championship) top goalscorer, and won the 1998 Campeonato Carioca de Juniores.

Rivaldo Costa joined Araçatuba (São Paulo) in 1999, where he had his first taste of first team football.

=== Europe ===
In 2000, Rivaldo Costa was signed by Deportivo de La Coruña to play for their "B" team in the Segunda División B. His two-year stay was unsuccessful though, as Deportivo "B" finished last in the table, and were relegated to the Tercera División in 2001.

He played for Portuguese Segunda Divisão side Rio Ave and Italian Serie C2/B side F.C. Forlì, before moving to Saudi Arabia to play for Al Taawon in late 2002.

=== Asia ===
Most of Rivaldo Costa's successes in football come from his time in Asia, most notably in Indonesia, where he played for Petrokimia Putra Gresik and Arema Malang in 2003 and 2004 respectively.

On July 20, 2003, while playing for Petrokimia Putra Gresik in the ASEAN Club Championship Quarter-Final, Rivaldo scored a goal against SAFFC as his club overcame a 2–0 deficit to win the game 3–2 and qualify for the Semi-Finals of the competition.

However, Gresik were knocked out by eventual winners East Bengal FC in the Semi-Final, but in the Third Place Match on July 26, Rivaldo Costa scored first to help his team to a 3–0 win over Perak FA.

Despite success in regional competition, Gresik were relegated from the Indonesian Premier Division (Division Utama) at the end of the 2003 season, and Rivaldo Costa joined Arema Malang.

A year later, Rivaldo Costa picked up his first major medal, scoring 12 goals as he helped Arema Malang to the Indonesian Division 1 (Divisi Satu) title, but it was a short-lived stay at the club, as he returned to Brazil to play for Bonsucesso in Rio de Janeiro.

He returned to play in Asia four years later, when he was signed by S-League club Geylang United.

On May 20, 2008, Rivaldo Costa scored his first goal for Geylang a decisive equaliser in the 94th minute to grab one point in a nail-biting 2–2 draw against Balestier Khalsa.

He scored his first hat-trick for the Eagles in a 5–1 romp over Dalian Shide Siwu FC on 6 November 2008.

Rivaldo Costa and his compatriot Luiz Carlos Machado Júnior have been released from Geylang United following an unsuccessful 2008 season where they finished 6th in the league.

== Honours ==
=== Club ===
Juniores do Botafogo F.R.

- Campeonato Carioca de Juniores: 1998

Petrokimia Putra Gresik

- ASEAN Club Championship: 2003 (3rd place

Arema Malang

- Indonesian Division 1 (Divisi Satu): 2004

=== Individual ===
- Campeonato Carioca de Juniores top goalscorer: 1995

== Personal life ==
Rivaldo Costa speaks five languages fluently – his native Portuguese, English, Italian, Spanish, as well as Indonesian.
