= Dennis Lim (footballer) =

Singaporean footballer

Personal information
- Place of birth: Singapore

Senior career*
Years	Team	Apps	(Gls)
- Balestier Khalsa FC
- Young Lions FC
-2006	Hougang United FC		
- * Club domestic league appearances and goals

Dennis Lim (born in Singapore) is a Singaporean retired footballer.
