= Kwon Da-kyung =

South Korean footballer

Personal information
- Place of birth: South Korea
- Height: 1.77 m (5 ft 9 1/2 in)
- Position: Midfielder

Senior career*
Years	Team	Apps	(Gls)
2012	Seoul United		
2013–2014	Home United	36	(9)
- * Club domestic league appearances and goals

Kwon Da-kyung is a South Korean professional footballer who last played for Home United in the S.League. He plays as a midfielder.

== Club career ==
Kwon played in the K League for his first club Seoul United. In 2013, he moved over to the S.League and played for Home United. He was released by Home United at the end of the 2014 season.
