= Walid Lounis =

Singaporean footballer

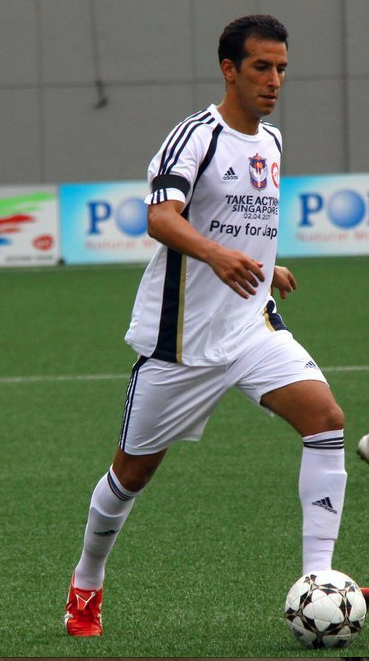
- Walid Lounis Playing for "Pray for Japan" Charity Game

Personal information
- Date of birth: 7 April 1983 (age 43)
- Place of birth: Carthage, Tunis, Tunisia
- Height: 1.83 m (6 ft 0 in)
- Position: Defender

Team information
- Current team: Hougang United (Assistant Coach)

Senior career*
Years	Team	Apps	(Gls)
2001–2004	AS Marsa		(3)
2004–2005	Kitchee		
2005–2007	AS Marsa	12	(0)
2008	Home United	28	(2)
2009–2010	Geylang United	51	(2)
2011–2012	Gombak United	57	(2)
2013–2014	Tanjong Pagar United	49	(5)
2014–2015	Woodlands Wellington	34	(3)

Managerial career
- 2025–: Hougang United (assistant)
- * Club domestic league appearances and goals as of 30 September 2010

Walid Lounis (born 7 April 1983), is a Tunisian-born Singaporean retired footballer who last played for Woodlands Wellington in the S.League. He is also currently an accredited football coach in Singapore where he is currently the assistant coach of Singapore Premier League club Hougang United.

== Playing career ==
Lounis started his football career with AS Marsa back at home in 2001 before moving to Asia to sign with Hong Kong Premier League club Kitchee in July 2004 at 21 years old. Lounis than moved back home to rejoined with AS Marsa a year later in July 2005.

In January 2008, Lounis moved to Singapore to sign with Home United where he then signed for Geylang United in January 2009, later on, he signed for Gombak United in 2011 and was retained in 2012 for the AFC Cup 2010 competition.

Lounis joined Tanjong Pagar United in 2013.

== Coaching career ==
Moving to coaching professionally in 2014 after retirement from professional football, had earned the coaching degrees from Asian Football Federation in 2012.

He had worked with the like of Fcbscola Singapore (Barcelona Academy), Coerver Football Singapore, Gombak United Football Club, Geylang International Football Club.

He currently serves as the technical director of the International Soccer Academy, where he led the U12 and U16 teams to championship titles.

In 2025, Lounis was recruited by Singapore Premier League club Hougang United to coach their youth academy. In October, after Pannarai Pansiri was promoted as the club head coach, Lounis then became his assistant coach at the club.

== Personal life ==
Lounis obtained Singapore citizenship in 2007 but had never been called to the Singapore national team.

Lounis grown up idolising Tunisian international Radhi Jaïdi. He is a close friends of Yazid Yasin, Jeremy Chiang, Adrian Dhanaraj, and Hafiz Rahim during his time at Geylang United.

== Honours ==
- Bronze medal for finishing 2nd runner up in the league
- Champion Singapore Cup
- Play in Asian Cup winner (AFC)
- Singapore cup 2nd runner up
- Singapore cup runner up
