= Vasile Ghindaru =

Romanian footballer

Personal information
- Date of birth: 9 May 1978 (age 48)
- Place of birth: Braşov, Romania
- Height: 1.80 m (5 ft 11 in)
- Position: Midfielder

Senior career*
Years	Team	Apps	(Gls)
1995–1996	Victoria Bod	?	(?)
1996–2002	Braşov	92	(3)
1998–1999	→ Tractorul Brașov	9	(1)
2001	→ Astra Ploiești	7	(0)
2002–2003	Astra Ploiești	19	(2)
2003–2004	Petrolul Ploiești	20	(4)
2004	Braşov	13	(4)
2005	FC Ghimbav	3	(0)
2005	Petrolul Ploiești	11	(0)
2006	Astra Ploiești	11	(6)
2006–2008	Universitatea Cluj	38	(2)
2007–2009	Concordia Chiajna	0	(0)
2010–2011	Geylang United	48	(4)
2011	Politehnica Iași	6	(0)
Total		277	(26)
- * Club domestic league appearances and goals as of 14 March 2018

Vasile Ghindaru (born 9 May 1978) is a Romanian former footballer who played as a midfielder. Born in Braşov, Ghindaru started his career at FC Brașov, but also played for other teams in the Braşov zone such as: Victoria Bod, Tractorul Brașov or FC Ghimbav. In the Liga I, besides FC Brașov, he played for Astra Ploiești and Petrolul Ploiești. On the end of his career Ghindaru left for Singapore in 2010, where he played for Geylang United.
