= Lee Kwan-woo =

South Korean footballer (born 1978)

Lee Kwan-Woo 이관우
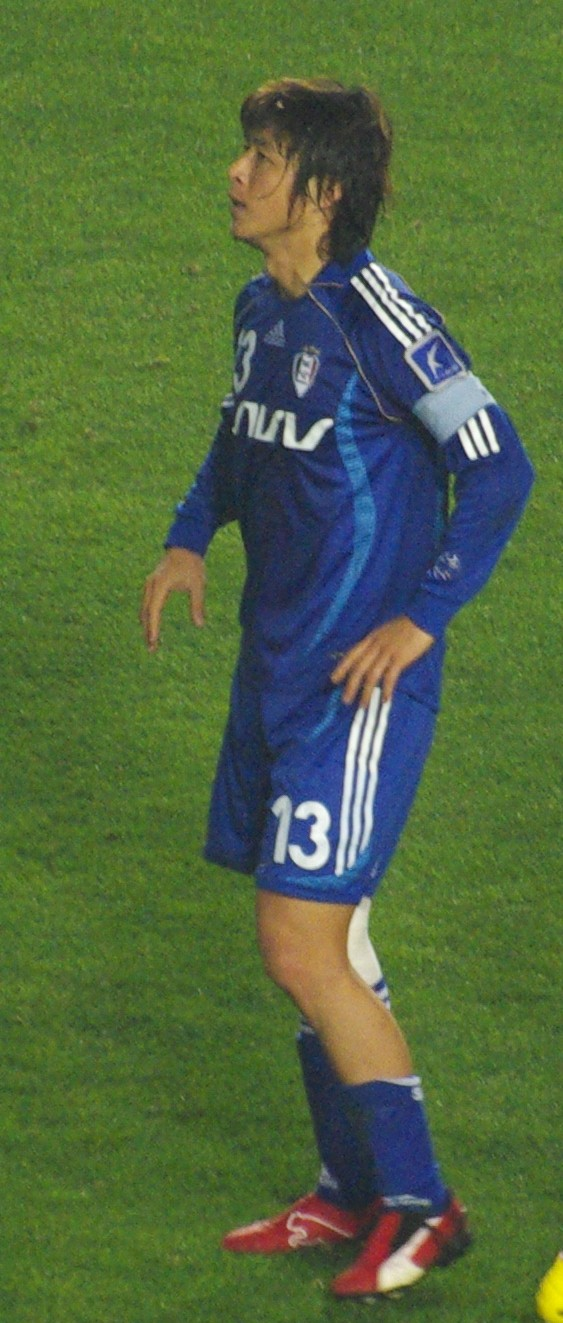
- Lee in 2007

Personal information
- Date of birth: 25 February 1978 (age 48)
- Place of birth: Seoul, South Korea
- Height: 1.75 m (5 ft 9 in)
- Position: Midfielder

Youth career
- 1996–1999: Hanyang University

Senior career*
Years	Team	Apps	(Gls)
2000–2006	Daejeon Citizen	126	(15)
2006–2010	Suwon Samsung Bluewings	65	(8)
2013–2014	Home United	32	(10)

International career
1996–1997	South Korea U20	8	(4)
1999–2000	South Korea U23	26	(7)
2000–2008	South Korea	13	(1)
- * Club domestic league appearances and goals

- Lee Kwan-woo
- Hangul: 이관우
- Hanja: 李官雨
- RR: I Gwanu
- MR: I Kwanu

Lee Kwan-Woo (born 25 February 1978) is a South Korean football coach and former player.

== Early life ==
Born in Seoul, Lee graduated from Chunghwa Elementary School, Hanyang Middle School, Hanyang Technical High School, and Hanyang University.

== Playing career ==
Nicknamed "Sirius" and dubbed "Kwanquelme" by his fans, Lee began his professional football career in the K-League by joining the community based club, Daejeon Citizen in 2000. During his stay in Daejeon, he established himself as a fan favorite with his accurate passes and long shots. In addition, his record of 22 goals and 18 assists made him an icon amongst the Purple Crew; however, in July 2006, he left Daejeon and joined its rival club, Suwon Samsung Bluewings. Before joining the Bluewings, he suffered a knee injury in a car crash. He almost retired but came back strong for Suwon and even made a national squad.

After a poor seasonal campaign in 2005, the Bluewings aimed to rebuild their squad during the transfer window, and brought in Lee Kwan-Woo along with others notably Baek Ji-hoon for the 2006 season. This proved to be a vital move, as the Bluewings finished the season as runners-up despite being one of the top favorites. At the start of the 2007 campaign, he was given the armband for the Suwon Bluewings, but lost his captaincy to his teammate Song Chong-gug at the start of the 2008 season. Nevertheless, his keen passing and ball distribution remain invaluable to the Suwon Bluewings.

He is member of 30-30 Club since 25 August 2007.

In 2013, he joined Home United FC as their club marquee player.

== Coaching career ==
Lee Kwan-woo worked as a youth coach in Suwon Bluewings from 2015 to 2017. And He has served as a head coach since 2018 under Kim Dae-eui who is the football manager of Suwon FC.

== Career statistics ==
=== Club ===
Appearances and goals by club, season and competition
Club	Season	League			National cup (Note: Includes Korean FA Cup.)		League cup (Note: Includes K-League Cup.)		Asia		Total	
Club	Season	Division	Apps	Goals	Apps	Goals	Apps	Goals	Apps	Goals	Apps	Goals
Daejeon Citizen	2000	K-League	9	0			3	1	—			
Daejeon Citizen	2001	K-League	5	3			7	3	—			
Daejeon Citizen	2002	K-League	19	2			0	0				
Daejeon Citizen	2003	K-League	38	4	3	3	—					
Daejeon Citizen	2004	K-League	21	3	4	0	8	2	—		33	5
Daejeon Citizen	2005	K-League	21	2	2	0	11	2	—		34	4
Daejeon Citizen	2006	K-League	13	1	0	0	10	2	—		23	3
Daejeon Citizen	Total		126	15			39	10				
Suwon Samsung Bluewings	2006	K-League	14	2	4	0	1	0	—		19	2
Suwon Samsung Bluewings	2007	K-League	25	4	2	0	10	0	—		37	4
Suwon Samsung Bluewings	2008	K-League	22	2	1	0	6	0	—		29	2
Suwon Samsung Bluewings	2009	K-League	3	0	0	0	0	0	1	0	4	0
Suwon Samsung Bluewings	2010	K-League	1	0	0	0	4	0	0	0	5	0
Suwon Samsung Bluewings	Total		65	8	7	0	21	0	1	0	94	8
Career total			190	23			60	10				

=== International ===
Results list South Korea's goal tally first.

Date	Venue	Opponent	Score	Result	Competition
29 September 2003	Incheon, South Korea	Nepal	1 goal	16–0	2004 AFC Asian Cup qualification

== Honours ==
Suwon Samsung Bluewings

- FA Cup runner-up: 2006
- K-League runner-up: 2006
- Samsung Hauzen Cup: 2008
- K League Classic: 2008
- The Pan Pacific Championship: 2009
- FA Cup: 2009, 2010

Daejeon Citizen

- FA Cup: 2001
- Hauzen Cup runner-up: 2004
- The Korean Super Cup: runner-up 2002

Individual

- Most Valuable Player Award at the National Football Championship: 1995
- Puma Best 11 MF Part: 2002
- Hummel Korea Sports Today Award for this year's Player of the Year: 2002
- Hummel Korea Sports Today Best 11: 2003
- K-League Allstar Award: 2003
- Kika Goal Award:2003
- K League Best XI: 2003. 2006, 2007
- S.League Player of the Month Of April: 2013
- YEO's Player of the Year: 2013

Sporting positions
Preceded by Kim Nam-Il	Suwon Samsung Bluewings captain 2007	Succeeded by Song Chong-Gug
