= Siddiq Durimi =

Singaporean footballer

Personal information
- Full name: Muhammad Siddiq Bin Durimi
- Date of birth: 27 May 1988 (age 38)
- Place of birth: Singapore
- Height: 1.73 m (5 ft 8 in)
- Position: Goalkeeper

Team information
- Current team: Geylang International
- Number: 21

Senior career*
Years	Team	Apps	(Gls)
2009	Home United	4	(0)
2010	Geylang United	13	(0)
2011	Home United	0	(0)
2012–2013	Admiralty	?	(?)
2013–	Geylang International	7	(0)
- * Club domestic league appearances and goals as of 13 July 2014

Muhammad Siddiq Bin Durimi (born 27 May 1988) is a Singaporean professional footballer who currently plays for Geylang International in the S.League. He plays as a goalkeeper.

== Education ==
Siddiq studied mechanical technology at ITE Simei, but quit his studies after just four months.

== Football career ==
In 2004, Siddiq joined Home United's under-16 team and then later joined the National Football Academy's under-18 team.

Siddiq has played in the S.League and Singapore National Football League. Siddiq joined Geylang International in 2010, shortly before joining Home United in 2011.

In March 2011, Siddiq failed to turn up for training and was uncontactable.

Siddiq left the professional football scene and entered the semi-pro scene, by joining NFL side Admiralty in 2012. Siddiq returned to the Eagles at the end of 2013.

== Personal life ==
As Siddiq had illegally modified his motorcycle, he was fined and borrowed money to pay the fines. His teammates at Home United gathered $6,500 for him to pay off his loans but took up more loans.
