= Toh Guo'An =

Singaporean footballer

Personal information
- Full name: Toh Guo'An
- Date of birth: September 5, 1982 (age 44)
- Place of birth: Singapore
- Height: 1.78 m (5 ft 10 in)
- Position: Goalkeeper

Team information
- Current team: SAFFC
- Number: 1

Senior career*
Years	Team	Apps	(Gls)
2001–2002	Tampines Rovers FC	13	(0)
2003–2004	Young Lions	4	(0)
2005–	SAFFC	25	(0)
- * Club domestic league appearances and goals as of January 1, 2008

Toh Guo'An (Chinese: 卓国安; born September 5, 1982) is a Singaporean football player who is currently a goalkeeper for the S.League club Singapore Armed Forces Football Club.

== Club career ==
Toh started his football career as a 19-year-old for Tampines Rovers Football Club the Prime League team. He won the Prime League Players of the year award that year. He eventually progressed up the ranks to the S-League squad the following year.

In 2001, Toh helped the Tampines Rovers's Prime League Team to finish 3rd in the Prime League. He also made his S-League debut in the same year.

In Toh 1st full season in the S-League in 2002, he won his first Singapore Cup medal with Tampines Rovers Football Club.

In 2003, Toh become a member of the pioneer squad of the Young Lions (Singapore football team).

In 2005, Toh moved to SAFFC as he was serving his National Service. He was registered as a Prime League player. He made his SAFFC debut on the 31st of August against Woodlands Wellington FC.

Toh helped SAFFC to win the 2006, 2007, 2008 and recently the 2009 S-League Championship and the 2007, 2008 Singapore Cup, his 4th S-League and 3rd Singapore Cup winners medal in 7 full season as a professional.

Toh made his debut in Asia's premier club competition, AFC Champions League when he came on as a substitute against Suwon Samsung Bluewings on 19 May 2009.

== Honours ==
=== Club ===
==== Tampines Rovers Football Club ====
- Singapore Cup: 2002

==== Singapore Armed Forces ====
- S.League: 2006, 2007, 2008, 2009
- Singapore Cup: 2007, 2008
