= Ismail Yunos =

Singaporean footballer (born 1986)

Personal information
- Full name: Ismail bin Yunos
- Date of birth: 24 October 1986 (age 40)
- Place of birth: Singapore
- Height: 1.85 m (6 ft 1 in)
- Position: Centre-back

Team information
- Current team: Home United
- Number: 8

Youth career
- 1998: Tampines Rovers
- 1998–2004: National Football Academy

Senior career*
Years	Team	Apps	(Gls)
2005–2009	Young Lions	91	(2)
2009–2010	Home United	13	(1)
2011–2012	Gombak United	48	(0)
2013–	Home United	16	(0)

International career^{‡}
2005–	Singapore	18	(0)
- * Club domestic league appearances and goals as of 6 January 2014 ‡ National team caps and goals as of 6 January 2014

Ismail bin Yunos (born 24 October 1986) is a Singaporean centre-back who plays for S-League side Home United and the Singapore national football team.

== Club career ==
Ismail has previously played for S.League clubs Home United, Gombak United and Young Lions.

== International career ==
He was part of the team that won the Tiger Cup in 2005 and the 2007 ASEAN Football Championship two years later. He was also part of the Singapore Under-23 team that took part in the 2005 Southeast Asian Games in Philippines and also won a bronze medal for the 2007 edition in Korat, Thailand.

Possessing a lanky frame and a composure belying his age, Ismail was called up by national team coach Radojko Avramovic into the Lions squad for the first time in September 2004 after a series of promising performances for the Under-18 and U-21 teams. But he only got his first team debut for the Singapore on 28 December 2006, in the invitational tournament, King's Cup held in Thailand, against Vietnam.

A mid-season transfer to Warriors F.C., Ismail played an exception role in marshalling the defense for the Warriors. Wearing the number 4 shirt, he made numerous tackles to deny the opponents from scoring. Ismail was instrumental in the Warriors 1-0 win over Albirex Niigata S FC when they clinched their first title in 5 years and their 9th title in the league's 19 years history.

== Honours ==
Warriors

- S League (1): 2014

=== International ===
Singapore

- ASEAN Football Championship: 2004, 2007
- Southeast Asian Games: Bronze Medal - 2007
