= Miroslav Latiak =

Slovak footballer

Personal information
- Full name: Miroslav Latiak
- Date of birth: 19 March 1981 (age 45)
- Place of birth: Czechoslovakia
- Height: 1.78 m (5 ft 10 in)
- Position: Striker

Senior career*
Years	Team	Apps	(Gls)
2003–2004	Ružomberok	40	(2)
2004–2006	Ružomberok	?	(7)
2006–2007	Rimavská Sobota	22	(2)
2007	Tatran Prešov	13	(0)
2008–2010	Geylang United	18	(4)
2010–2011	Tatran Liptovský Mikuláš	27	(5)
2012	Ayeyawady United		
2013–2017	Tatran Liptovský Mikuláš	0	(0)
- * Club domestic league appearances and goals

Miroslav Latiak (born 19 March 1981) is a Slovak former footballer who played as a forward.

Prior to joining Geylang United, Latiak most notably played for MFK Ružomberok in his native Slovakia. However, he shuffled between the Corgoň Liga (Slovak Superliga) team and the 2. slovenská futbalová liga (Slovak Second Division) team.

On 20 April 2008, Latiak opened his S-League scoring accounts with a brace as he helped his side to a 2–1 win over Woodlands Wellington at the Woodlands Stadium. He later played in Myanmar for Ayeyawady United, before returning to Slovakia for the final years of his professional career.
