= Mike Wong =

American ice hockey player (born 1955)

- Born: January 14, 1955 (age 71) Minneapolis, Minnesota, United States
- Height: 6 ft 3 in (191 cm)
- Weight: 204 lb (93 kg; 14 st 8 lb)
- Position: Center
- Shot: Left
- Played for: Detroit Red Wings
- NHL draft: 77th overall, 1975; Detroit Red Wings
- WHA draft: 32nd overall, 1974; Indianapolis Racers
- Playing career: 1975–1979

Michael Anthony Wong (born January 14, 1955, in Minneapolis, Minnesota) is an American retired ice hockey forward who played in 22 games for the Detroit Red Wings during the 1975–76 season. He is also a former Minnesota Golden Gloves boxing champion. He was drafted 7th (77th overall) in the 1975 NHL Amateur Draft. Wong is of Chinese descent.

== Professional career ==
Wong played junior hockey in Minnesota and was called upon to join the American national junior team 1974 World Junior Championships. This was the first year of the tournament and was held in Leningrad. Wong did not score a point in five games.

Wong joined the Montreal Bleu Blanc Rouge of the Quebec Major Junior Hockey League. In the 1974–75 season he recorded 27 goals and 41 assists for 67 points. The Red Wings selected Wong with their 7th pick, 77th overall, in the 1975 NHL Amateur Draft. Wong was also drafted 61st overall in the 1974 WHA Amateur Draft by the Indianapolis Racers of the World Hockey Association.

Wong started the season with the Kalamazoo Wings of the International Hockey League, in which he scored 42 points in 39 games. He was called up to play for Detroit on October 11, 1975, for a game against the California Golden Seals. He remained with Detroit for 22 games, and scored one goal and one assist. He ended his time in the NHL with a plus/minus rating of -11.

For the next three seasons, Wong would split his time between Kalamazoo and several other teams. He played for the Rhode Island Reds of the American Hockey League in 1976–77, the Muskegon Mohawks of the IHL in 1977–78, and the Johnstown Wings of the North East Hockey League in 1978–79. He retired from pro hockey after the 1978–79 season.

== After pro hockey ==
Wong returned to Minnesota spent several years in Bloomington, Minnesota, playing for Buck's Unpainted Furniture U.S. senior elite team, he married his high school sweetheart. He later coached his son Jason's youth hockey teams in Minnesota. Jason went on to play junior and college hockey in Minnesota.

== Career statistics ==
=== Regular season and playoffs ===
			Regular season					Playoffs
Season	Team	League	GP	G	A	Pts	PIM	GP	G	A	Pts	PIM
1973–74	Minnesota Jr. North Stars	MWJHL	57	24	32	56	128	—	—	—	—	—
1974–75	Montreal Juniors	QMJHL	67	27	41	68	130	9	0	2	2	16
1975–76	Detroit Red Wings	NHL	22	1	1	2	12	—	—	—	—	—
1975–76	Kalamazoo Wings	IHL	39	20	22	42	81	—	—	—	—	—
1976–77	Rhode Island Reds	AHL	18	3	5	8	6	—	—	—	—	—
1976–77	Kalamazoo Wings	IHL	24	12	10	22	22	—	—	—	—	—
1977–78	Kalamazoo Wings	IHL	8	0	1	1	0	—	—	—	—	—
1977–78	Muskegon Mohawks	IHL	58	23	18	41	63	4	1	0	1	18
1978–79	Kalamazoo Wings	IHL	6	2	2	4	21	—	—	—	—	—
1978–79	Johnstown Red Wings	NEHL	53	18	26	44	81	—	—	—	—	—
IHL totals			135	57	53	110	187	4	1	0	1	18
NHL totals			22	1	1	2	12	—	—	—	—	—

=== International ===
Year	Team	Event	GP	G	A	Pts	PIM
1974	United States	WJC	5	0	0	0	4
Junior totals			5	0	0	0	4
