= Aide Iskandar =

Singaporean footballer and coach

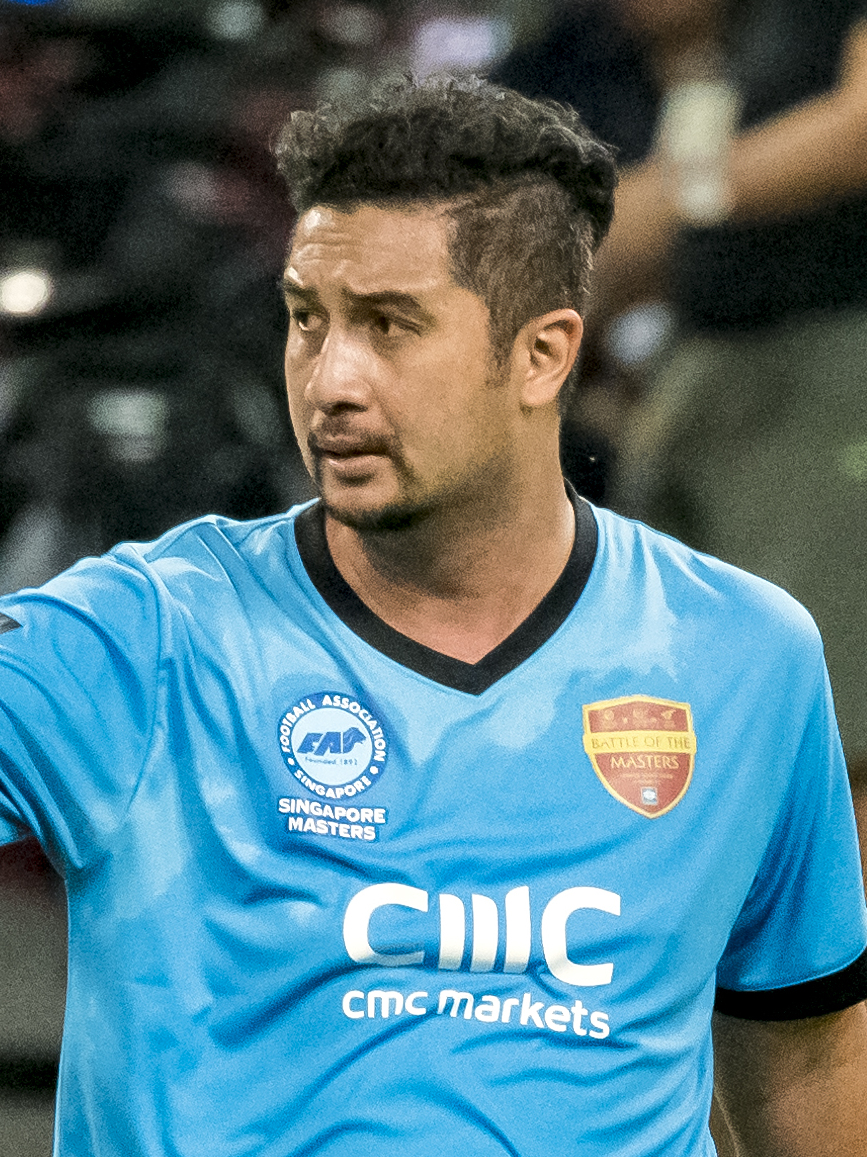
- Aide playing in a charity game in 2017

Personal information
- Full name: Aide Iskandar bin Sahak
- Date of birth: 28 May 1975 (age 51)
- Place of birth: Singapore
- Height: 1.82 m (5 ft 11 1/2 in)
- Position: Centre-back

Senior career*
| Years | Team | Apps | (Gls) |
| 1996–2005 | Home United | 135 | (16) |
| 2006–2007 | Johor FC | 23 | (2) |
| 2006 | → Tampines Rovers (loan) | 18 | (1) |
| 2007–2008 | Geylang United | 57 | (4) |
| 2009 | Sengkang Punggol | 0 | (0) |
| Total | | 233 | (23) |

International career
| 1995–2007 | Singapore | 121 | (1) |

Managerial career
- 2009–2011: Sengkang Punggol
- 2012: Singapore (assistant coach)
- 2013: Courts Young Lions
- 2013–2015: Singapore U-23
- 2016: Geylang International (technical director)
- * Club domestic league appearances and goals

Aide Iskandar bin Sahak (born 28 May 1975) is a former professional footballer. He was a member of the Singapore national team which won the AFF Championship in 1998, 2004 and 2007, captaining the team in the latter two editions.

== Club career ==
=== Home United ===
Aide spent 10 years with Home United in the S.League since the inaugural season of the S.league in 1996.

=== Johor FA ===
In November 2005, Aide joined Johor FA playing in the Malaysian League.

==== Loan to Tampines Rovers ====
Aide then went on loan at Tampines Rovers for the 2006 season in Singapore.

=== Geylang United ===
Aide moved to Geylang United in 2007.

=== Sengkang Punggol ===
In 2009, Aide joined Sengkang Punggol before retiring shortly.

== Controversies ==
On 26 August 2007, Aide insulted referee Sukhbir Singh, reportedly asking, "How much did you bet on the game?" after his team, Geylang United controversially lost to Home United in a league game by conceding two goals in the final five minutes. Aide was ban five games and a S$2500 fine was imposed on 4 September 2007 by FAS. Upon appeal, the FAS reduced his ban to two matches and increased his fine to S$4,000 in November.

Because of that incident, he was dropped from the national team for the game against UAE and missed the World Cup qualifier against Palestine. However, he was recalled into the team pending his appeal on the ban.

== International career ==
Aide made his international debut against New Zealand on 21 February 1995. He scored his first international goal against traditional rivals Malaysia on 3 June 2006. He was inducted into the FIFA Century Club in June 2007.

On 9 November 2007, just hours before the kick off of the World Cup 2010 qualifiers against Tajikistan, he sensationally retired from international football. Indra Sahdan Daud took over as the new national team captain.

== Coaching career ==
In April 2008, it was announced that Aide would become the Technical Director of a proposed A.C. Milan Junior School which would begin operations in Singapore late 2008 where Aide is a fan of the Italian Serie A club, AC Milan.

=== Sengkang Punggol ===
Aide joined Sengkang Punggol for the 2009 S.League season as a player–assistant coach, in a similar position as Mirko Grabovac the previous season where head coach Jörg Steinebrunner was sacked by the club and Aide was appointed as caretaker coach.

=== Courts Young Lions ===
Aide was appointed head coach of Courts Young Lions in January 2013. The Young Lions recorded their first league victory only in August, finishing wooden spoonist in his maiden season.

=== Singapore U-23 ===
With the resignation of V. Sundramoorthy, Aide took over the reins of the Singapore national under-23 football team in October 2013. He guided them to third place at the 2013 Southeast Asian Games. Following Singapore's 1-0 loss to Indonesia at the 2015 SEA Games, Singapore failed to advance into the semi-finals. Aide consequently resigned as coach of the national under-23 football team.

=== Geylang International ===
Aide was appointed the technical director of Geylang International in 2016.

== Personal life ==
Aide married Ezreen Taib Zohri on 7 May 2000. They have three children – sons Andre (born 2001) and Adiel (born 2004), and daughter Estee (born 2007). He is the older brother of Kuching City F.C. head coach, Aidil Sharin Sahak.

== Honours ==
=== Player ===
==== Home United ====
- S.League: 1999, 2003
- Singapore Cup: 2000, 2001, 2003, 2005

==== Tampines Rovers ====
- Singapore Cup: 2006

==== Singapore ====
- AFF Championship: 1998, 2004, 2007
- Southeast Asian Games: Bronze medal – 1995

=== Manager ===
Singapore U-23

- Southeast Asian Games: Bronze medal – 2013

== See also ==
- List of men's footballers with 100 or more international caps

Sporting positions
| Preceded by Nazri Nasir | Singapore national team captain 2003–2007 | Succeeded by Indra Sahdan Daud |
