= Noh Rahman =

Singaporean footballer

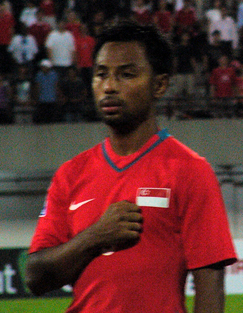
- Noh playing for Singapore in 2008

Personal information
- Full name: Mohamed Noh bin Rahman
- Date of birth: 2 August 1980 (age 46)
- Place of birth: Singapore
- Height: 1.71 m (5 ft 7 in)
- Position: Defender

Team information
- Current team: Tampines Rovers (head coach)

Senior career*
| Years | Team | Apps | (Gls) |
| 2001 | Geylang United | 31 | (1) |
| 2002–2003 | Singapore Armed Forces | 40 | (0) |
| 2004–2008 | Geylang United | 123 | (3) |
| 2009 | Sengkang Punggol | 5 | (0) |
| 2010–2012 | Singapore Armed Forces | 65 | (0) |
| 2013–2016 | Home United | 50 | (3) |
| 2016–2017 | Tampines Rovers | 30 | (2) |
| Total | | 344 | (10) |

International career
| 2001–2013 | Singapore | 88 | (0) |

Managerial career
- 2017–2019: Singapore (fitness coach)
- 2019–2021: Singapore (assistant)
- 2019: Home United (assistant)
- 2019: Home United (interim)
- 2019–2022: Lion City Sailors (assistant)
- 2023–2025: Tampines Rovers (academy coach)
- 2023: Tampines Rovers (assistant)
- 2024–2025: Tampines Rovers U21
- 2024–2025: Singapore (assistant)
- 2025–2026: Tampines Rovers
- 2026–: Singapore (assistant)
- * Club domestic league appearances and goals

Mohamed Noh bin Rahman (born 2 August 1980) is a Singaporean retired footballer who last played as a defender. He is currently the assistant coach for the Singapore national team under Gavin Lee.

Rahman's versatility means he can be employed in defence and in midfield for both club and country.

== Club career ==
Noh has been with Geylang United since the second season of the S-League in 1997. He is considered the most senior player in terms of years spent with the club, and was the vice-captain for the squad.

He is a natural right-back, though he can also play in the defensive midfield, centre-back and left-back positions when the need arises.

He left Geylang United in 2009 after 11 years with the club, citing his desire to seek new challenges, and joined Sengkang Punggol along with his former team-mates Aide Iskandar and Amos Boon.

== International career ==
Noh made his debut for the national team in 2001, in a friendly match against Thailand in a 1–1 draw. Noh was instrumental in a friendly match against New Zealand on 22 May 2001 where Singapore famously defeated New Zealand 3–0.

Called up by then Singapore head coach, Jan B. Poulsen to help fill the gap left by the absence of the injured Lim Tong Hai when the veteran full-back sustained a long injury, Noh shone against the likes of Kyrgyzstan, Kuwait and Bahrain in the 2002 FIFA World Cup qualification matches with his passing and positioning skills. However, he sustained a debilitating knee injury that left him out of sorts for the 2002 AFF Championship, but he has shown signs of getting back to his best for the national team.

However, having just recovered from a knee injury, he was called up and rushed to play in the 2002 AFF Championship opening group match against Malaysia and it came with debilitating consequences. He was out of sorts together with the whole Singapore back line and Singapore lost 4–0 at home as a result. As a result, many left fuming and doubting his ability at the international stage.

Noh was in the squads that won back-to-back titles in the 2004 AFF Championship and the 2007 AFF Championship. His brave block to deflect a goal-bound effort away for a corner in the second leg of the 2007 AFF Championship final against Thailand has earned him the 'cult hero' status among the Singaporean fans.

Noh was also praised by fans and the media for his excellent performances for the national side for the 2010 FIFA World Cup Qualifiers and its related friendlies.

Noh was one of the three Singapore players to wear the captain's armband at the 2008 AFF Championship, cementing his position as vice-captain of the squad behind Indra Sahdan Daud after starting as captain against Myanmar and Vietnam.

== Managerial career ==
=== Home United ===
After retiring from football, Noh transition into coaching. He then joined Home United in January 2019 working under head coach Saswadimata Dasuki, however in April, Noh was than promoted to interim head coach until the end of the 2019 season in September

=== Singapore ===
Initially Noh was working with the Singapore national team as the team fitness coach in January 2017 but in January 2019, Noh was promoted to assistant coach where he work under head coach, Tatsuma Yoshida until 2021.

=== Lion City Sailors ===
After Home United was rebranded as Lion City Sailors as the new privatised club owned, Noh joined Aurelio Vidmar as his assistant coach at the club in January 2020. Noh also worked under new Korean head coach Kim Do-hoon until his departure from the club where Noh also left.

=== Tampines Rovers ===
In January 2023, Noh joined Tampines Rovers where he worked under head coach Gavin Lee and assistant coach Akbar Nawas in June 2025. On 12 September, Noh was promoted to permanent head coach role after the club parted ways with former head coach Akbar. On 14 February 2026, Noh left the club after a mutual agreement.

== Managerial statistics ==
As of 14 February 2026

Managerial record by team and tenure
| Team | Nat. | From | To | Record | | | | | Ref. |
| Team | Nat. | From | To | G | W | D | L | Win % | Ref. |
|---|---|---|---|---|---|---|---|---|---|
| Home United (interim) | (Singapore) | 19 April 2019 | 1 July 2019 | 7 | 3 | 1 | 3 | 42.86 | |
| Home United (interim) | (Singapore) | 18 August 2019 | 18 December 2019 | 7 | 1 | 1 | 5 | 14.29 | |
| Tampines Rovers | (Singapore) | 12 September 2025 | 14 February 2026 | 21 | 14 | 2 | 5 | 66.67 | |
| Career Total | | | | 35 | 18 | 4 | 13 | 51.43 | |

== Honours ==
=== Club ===
Geylang United

- S-League: 2001
- Singapore FA Cup: 1996

=== International ===
Singapore

- AFF Championship: 2004, 2007
