= Syed Fadhil =

Singaporean footballer

Personal information
- Full name: Syed Mohamad Fadhil Naser Al-Yahaya
- Date of birth: April 16, 1981 (age 45)
- Place of birth: Singapore
- Height: 1.78 m (5 ft 10 in)
- Positions: Midfielder; defender

Team information
- Current team: Warriors FC
- Number: 6

Senior career*
Years	Team	Apps	(Gls)
1995–1996	Admiralty FC	-	(-)
1997–2002	Geylang United	38	(0)
2003–2004	Young Lions	40	(5)
2004–2007	Geylang United	87	(8)
2008–2009	Home United	48	(1)
2010–2012	Geylang United	87	(4)
2013–	Warriors FC	1	(0)

International career^{‡}
2002–2004	Singapore	15	(1)
- * Club domestic league appearances and goals as of May 21, 2009 ‡ National team caps and goals as of May 21, 2009

Syed Mohamad Fadhil Naser Al-Yahaya (born 16 April 1981) is a professional soccer player who plays for the Warriors FC in the S.League and the Singapore national football team.

He is a natural defensive midfielder.

== Club career ==
Fadhil has previously played for S.League clubs Admiralty FC, Young Lions, Home United and Geylang United.

== International career ==
He made his debut for the Singapore against North Korea on 7 February 2002.

=== International goals ===
Scores and results list Singapore's goal tally first.

No	Date	Venue	Opponent	Score	Result	Competition
1.	4 March 2003	National Stadium, Kallang, Singapore	Maldives	?–?	4–1	Friendly

== Honours ==
=== Club ===
==== Geylang United ====
- S.League: 2001
