= Juninho (footballer, born 1979) =

Brazilian footballer

Personal information
- Full name: Luiz Carlos Machado Júnior
- Date of birth: 5 June 1979 (age 47)
- Place of birth: Vila Velha, Brazil
- Height: 1.73 m (5 ft 8 in)
- Position: Forward

Senior career*
Years	Team	Apps	(Gls)
?	Atlético Mineiro	?	(?)
?	Botafogo (SP)	?	(?)
?	Inter de Limeira	?	(?)
?	Ferroviária	?	(?)
?	União da ilha da Madeira	?	(?)
?–2006	Rio Branco	?	(?)
2006–2007	Rioverdense	?	(?)
2008	Nanchang Bayi	23	(5)
?	Geylang United	?	(?)
- * Club domestic league appearances and goals as of May 20, 2008

Luiz Carlos Machado Júnior (born 5 June 1979), known as Juninho or Júnior, is a Brazilian footballer who played as a striker.
