= Sevki Sha'ban =

Singaporean footballer

Sevki Shaʽban
Personal information
- Full name: Sevki bin Shaʽban
- Date of birth: 2 May 1984 (age 42)
- Place of birth: Singapore
- Height: 1.76 m (5 ft 9 1/2 in)
- Position: Defender

Senior career*
| Years | Team | Apps | (Gls) |
| 2002–2003 | Sembawang Rangers | 61 | (1) |
| 2004–2005 | Young Lions | 3 | (0) |
| 2006–2009 | Gombak United | 104 | (1) |
| 2010–2011 | Geylang United | 13 | (1) |
| 2012 | LionsXII | 18 | (1) |
| 2013–2014 | Home United | 8 | (0) |
| 2015 | Geylang International | 1 | (0) |
| Total | | 208 | (4) |

International career
| 2007– | Singapore | 6 | (0) |
- * Club domestic league appearances and goals as of 00:47, 26 November 2014 (UTC)

Sevki bin Shaʽban (born 2 May 1984) is a former Singapore international footballer who played as a defender in the S.League.

== Club career ==
Previously, he played for Sembawang Rangers and Gombak United. Signed for Geylang United for the AFC 2010 competition, he had a serious injury and thus making season 2010 one for him to forget.

== International career ==
Selected for the National Team by Radojko Avramović for the national squad, and earn his 1st cap against Vietnam in 2008.
