= Rastislav Beličák =

Slovak footballer

Personal information
- Date of birth: 9 November 1977 (age 48)
- Place of birth: Czechoslovakia
- Height: 1.80 m (5 ft 11 in)
- Position: Midfielder

Senior career*
| Years | Team | Apps | (Gls) |
| 1997–2004 | MFK Košice | 12 | (0) |
| 2005 | Terengganu FA | 23 | (2) |
| 2005–2006 | FK Slavoj Trebišov | 14 | (1) |
| 2006–2007 | MFK Zemplín Michalovce | 22 | (1) |
| 2008–2010 | Geylang United | 31 | (7) |
- * Club domestic league appearances and goals

Rastislav Beličák (born 9 November 1977) is a Slovak former footballer who played as a midfielder.

== Career ==
Beličák grew up as a footballer in the youth system of MFK Košice, and stayed with the club when he started his professional career, before moving to Malaysia in February 2005 to play in the 2005 Malaysia Premier League for Terengganu FA. One year later, he moved back to his home country to play for FK Slavoj Trebišov. He joined MFK Zemplín Michalovce from Trebišov in the winter break of the 2006–07 Slovak First League, scoring his first goal for Michalovce in May 2007 in a match against Lučenec.

From 2008 Beličák played for Singapore side Geylang United. He scored in a 2–1 away win against Woodlands Wellington on 9 November 2008. By 2010 he was the club captain.
