= Syed Thaha =

Singaporean footballer

Personal information
- Full name: Syed Thaha Ahmad bin Syed Ali
- Date of birth: May 2, 1985 (age 41)
- Place of birth: Singapore
- Height: 1.72 m (5 ft 7 1/2 in)
- Position: Defender

Team information
- Current team: Balestier Khalsa

Senior career*
Years	Team	Apps	(Gls)
2004–2005	Geylang United	7	(0)
2006	Young Lions	21	(3)
2007–2011	Geylang United	136	(3)
2012–2014	Balestier Khalsa	10	(0)
2015	Geylang International	26	(0)

International career
2006–2007	Singapore	2	(0)
- * Club domestic league appearances and goals as of Dec 31, 2009

Syed Thaha Ahmad bin Syed Ali is a Singapore international football player who plays for Balestier Khalsa.

== Club career ==
Previously, he played for Young Lions and Geylang United.

== International career ==
Played for the National Team in 2006 by appearing as a substitute is his only cap to date for the National Team.

== Honours ==
Geylang United

- Singapore Cup: 2009

Balestier Khalsa

- Singapore Cup: 2014
- League Cup: 2013
