= Lim Tong Hai =

Singaporean footballer

Personal information
- Date of birth: 14 May 1969 (age 57)
- Place of birth: Singapore
- Position: Centre-back

Senior career*
Years	Team	Apps	(Gls)
1989	Jurong Town		
1990–1993	Geylang International		
1994–1995	Singapore FA		
1996–2001	Tanjong Pagar United		
2002–2003	Geylang United		

International career
1989–1999	Singapore	47	(1)

Managerial career
- Geylang United (Head of Development)
- 2006–07: Geylang United
- 2008: Geylang United
- 2010–2012: Geylang United (Team manager)
- * Club domestic league appearances and goals

Lim Tong Hai (born 14 May 1969) was a centre-back for the Singapore national football team from 1989 to 1999. He held various backroom roles at former club Geylang United after retiring from his playing career until his departure in 2012. Lim is widely considered one of the greatest defenders in Singapore's history. He was renowned for his marking, awareness and ability to anticipate a threat from the opposition. A precise tackler and an imposing defensive presence, Lim was also known for his aerial ability, strength, man-marking and tactical knowledge

== Club career ==
=== Geylang International ===
Lim played for Geylang International in the FAS Premier League

=== Singapore FA ===
In 1994, Lim signed for Singapore FA. He formed a strong partnership with South Korean Jang Jung in the heart of defence as the Lions achieved the M-League and Malaysia Cup double in 1994.

=== Tiong Bahru United (Now known as Tanjong Pagar United) ===
With the withdrawal of the Lions from Malaysian competitions and subsequent launch of the S.League, Lim signed for Tiong Bahru United in 1996. In 1998, the club changed it named to Tanjong Pagar United and he captained the club in its debut season to a Singapore Cup and Singapore FA Cup double.

=== Geylang United ===
Lim made a return to Geylang United in 2002, playing a further 2 seasons until he retired as a player in 2003 where he won the Singapore Cup.

== International career ==
Lim was part of the Singapore national football team at the 1993 Southeast Asian Games where Singapore won the bronze medal. In the semi-finals against Myanmar, after Singapore was 2–0 up, Lim in two attempts to clear the ball in the penalty area, scored two own goals instead, causing the match to be a draw at 2–2 in full time. The match went into extra time which was a draw again at 3–3 but Singapore lost the match in the resulting penalty shootouts 4–5.

== Coaching career ==
Lim retired from playing in 2003 and was appointed coach for Geylang United's Prime League team the following year. In 2006, he was promoted to caretaker coach of the first team and was likely to continue to lead the team for the 2007 S.League season as he was ready to rebuild the team after years of dismal results in the league, where Geylang United was last in the standings.

However, there was a turn of fortunes when Lim led Geylang to a much-improved 2007 season high of 4th in the S-League table. There were much changes in the Geylang United side with Kim Grant, Noh Rahman, Hassan Sunny and Lim leading the team for a better start for the 2007 S-League season.

In late 2007, he assumed the role of team manager when Slovak Jozef Herel was brought in as Geylang's coach.

== Management career ==
In September 2013, Lim was appointed to the Football Association of Singapore council.

He is also the chairman of the FAS' Referees' Committee.

== Post-football career ==
Post football, Lim became a sports and wellness senior lecturer with the Institute of Technical Education College East and also a physical education and sports science consultant with National Institute of Education.

He is currently with Sport Singapore as a Team Lead for the Coaching Industry Development (CID) team within CoachSG.

In 2023, Lim, alongside Jasmine Yeong-Nathan, was the assistant chef-de-mission for the Singapore delegation to the 2023 SEA Games.

== Personal life ==
Lim is married and has two children. His uncle, Lim Teong Kim is a formerly an assistant coach of Bayern Munich U-19, head coach of Malaysia U-17 and head coach of Perak.

== Statistics ==
=== International goals ===
No.	Date	Venue	Opponent	Score	Result	Competition
1.	6 September 1996	National Stadium, Kallang, Singapore	Philippines	3–0	3–0	1996 AFF Championship

== Honours ==
=== Club ===
==== Singapore FA ====
- M-League: 1994
- Malaysia Cup: 1994

==== Tanjong Pagar United ====
- Singapore Cup: 1998
- Singapore FA Cup: 1998

==== Geylang United ====
- Singapore Cup: 2003

Sporting positions
Preceded by David Lee	Singapore national team captain 1997	Succeeded by Nazri Nasir
