= Hafiz Rahim =

Singaporean footballer (1983–2020)

Personal information
- Full name: Hafiz Rahim
- Date of birth: 19 November 1983
- Date of death: 9 July 2020 (aged 36)
- Place of death: Singapore
- Position: Forward

Senior career*
Years	Team	Apps	(Gls)
2003–2004	Geylang United		
2004–2005	Singapore Armed Forces		
2006–2011	Geylang United	66	(9)
2012	Gombak United	21	(4)
2013–2015	Home United	1	(0)
2016–2017	Warriors	0	(0)
2017	Tampines Rovers Football Club		

International career^{‡}
2011–2014	Singapore	9	(1)
- * Club domestic league appearances and goals ‡ National team caps and goals as of 21:53, 7 January 2014 (UTC)

Hafiz Rahim (19 November 1983 – 9 July 2020) was a Singaporean footballer who played as a forward.

== Career ==
=== Club ===
Hafiz had previously played for S.League club Geylang United, Singapore Armed Forces FC, Gombak United and Home United.

=== International ===
Hafiz earned his first international cap against Thailand on 24 August 2011. He scored his only international goal against Laos on 7 June 2013.

== Career statistics ==
International goals

No	Date	Venue	Opponent	Score	Result	Competition
1	7 June 2013	New Laos National Stadium, Vientiane, Laos	Laos	2–5	2–5	Friendly

== Honours ==
Singapore

- ASEAN Football Championship: 2012

== Personal life ==
Hafiz died on 9 July 2020 during a motorcycle accident when the speeding lorry knocked him down at Tampines Ave 8, at the age of 36. Hafiz was unconscious when conveyed to Changi General Hospital (CGH), where he subsequently died the next morning. He was married and had three children.
