= Singapore Premier League Awards Night =

The Singapore Premier League Awards Night is a football awards ceremony held by the Football Association of Singapore since the S.League's inaugural season in 1996.

== Player of the Year award ==
The Player of the Year award is presented annually to the most outstanding player in the Singapore Premier League, recognising exceptional performances, consistency, leadership, and overall impact throughout the season. Considered one of the most prestigious honours of the Singapore Premier League Awards Night, the award celebrates players who have demonstrated excellence and significantly contributed to their club’s success.

Season	Player	Position	Club
S.League era
1996	(Croatia) Ivica Raguž	Midfielder	Singapore Armed Forces
1997	(Singapore) Nazri Nasir	Midfielder	Balestier Central
1998	(Singapore) S. Subramani	Defender	Tanjong Pagar United
1999	(Hungary) Zsolt Bücs	Midfielder	Home United
2000	(Croatia) Mirko Grabovac	Forward	Singapore Armed Forces
2001	(England) Daniel Bennett	Defender	Tanjong Pagar United
2002	(Thailand) Therdsak Chaiman	Forward	Singapore Armed Forces
2003	(Brazil) Peres de Oliveira	Forward	Home United
2004	(Thailand) Surachai Jaturapattarapong	Midfielder	Home United
2005	(Singapore) Noh Alam Shah	Forward	Tampines Rovers
2006	(Morocco) Abdelhadi Laakkad	Forward	Woodlands Wellington
2007	(Singapore) Aleksandar Đurić	Forward	Singapore Armed Forces
2008	(Singapore) Aleksandar Đurić (2)	Forward	Singapore Armed Forces
2009	(Cameroon) Valery Hiek	Defender	Home United
2010	(Singapore) Shahril Ishak	Forward	Home United
2011	(Bosnia and Herzegovina) Mislav Karoglan	Midfielder	Singapore Armed Forces
2012	(Singapore) Aleksandar Đurić (3)	Forward	Tampines Rovers
2013	(South Korea) Lee Kwan-Woo	Midfielder	Home United
2014	(Singapore) Hassan Sunny	Goalkeeper	Warriors
2015	(Japan) Fumiya Kogure	Midfielder	Albirex Niigata (S)
2016	(Japan) Atsushi Kawata	Forward	Albirex Niigata (S)
2017	(Japan) Kento Nagasaki	Midfielder	Albirex Niigata (S)
Singapore Premier League era
2018	(Japan) Wataru Murofushi	Midfielder	Albirex Niigata (S)
2019	(Singapore) Faris Ramli	Forward	Hougang United
2020	(Singapore) Gabriel Quak	Forward	Lion City Sailors
2021	(Japan) Tomoyuki Doi	Forward	Hougang United
2022	(Japan) Kodai Tanaka	Forward	Albirex Niigata (S)
2023	(Belgium) Maxime Lestienne	Forward	Lion City Sailors
2024–25	(Japan) Tomoyuki Doi (2)	Forward	Geylang International
2025–26	(Japan) Hide Higashikawa	Forward	Tampines Rovers

Note: nationality of players at presentation of award. A number of foreign players were naturalised to play for Singapore later in their career.

=== Awards won by nationality ===
Country	Players	Total
Singapore	6	9
Japan	7	8
Croatia	2	2
Thailand	2	2
Serbia	1	2
Hungary	1	1
England	1	1
Brazil	1	1
Morocco	1	1
South Korea	1	1
Cameroon	1	1
Bosnia and Herzegovina	1	1
Belgium	1	1

=== Awards won by club ===
Club	Players	Total
Lion City Sailors	8	8
Warriors	6	7
Albirex Niigata (S)	5	5
Tampines Rovers	3	3
Tanjong Pagar United	2	2
Hougang United	2	2
Geylang International	1	1
Balestier Central	1	1
Woodlands Wellington	1	1

== Top Scorer award ==
The Top Scorer Award, also known as the Golden Boot, is presented annually to the player who scores the most goals during the Singapore Premier League season. Recognised as one of the league’s most notable individual honors, the award highlights attacking excellence, consistency, and goal-scoring ability, celebrating players who have made a significant impact in front of goal throughout the campaign.

Season	Player	Club	Goals
S.League era
1996	(Croatia) Jure Eres	Singapore Armed Forces	28
1997	(Croatia) Goran Paulić	Balestier Central	21
1998	(England) Stuart Young	Home United	22
1999	(Croatia) Mirko Grabovac	Singapore Armed Forces	23
2000	(Croatia) Mirko Grabovac (2)	Singapore Armed Forces	19
2001	(Croatia) Mirko Grabovac (3)	Singapore Armed Forces	42^
2002	(Singapore) Mirko Grabovac (4)	Singapore Armed Forces	36^
2003	(Brazil) Peres de Oliveira	Home United	37^
2004	(Singapore) Egmar Goncalves	Home United	30
2005	(Singapore) Mirko Grabovac (5)	Tampines Rovers	26
2006	(Morocco) Abdelhadi Laakkad	Woodlands Wellington	23
2007	(Singapore) Aleksandar Đurić	Singapore Armed Forces	37
2008	(Singapore) Aleksandar Đurić (2)	Singapore Armed Forces	28
2009	(Singapore) Aleksandar Đurić (3)	Singapore Armed Forces	28
2010	(France) Frédéric Mendy	Étoile	21
2011	(Bosnia and Herzegovina) Mislav Karoglan	Singapore Armed Forces	33
2012	(France) Frédéric Mendy (2)	Home United	20
2013	(Singapore) Aleksandar Đurić (4)	Tampines Rovers	15
2013	(South Korea) Moon Soon-Ho	Woodlands Wellington	15
2014	(Brazil) Rodrigo Tosi	DPMM	24
2015	(Brazil) Rafael Ramazotti	DPMM	21
2016	(Brazil) Rafael Ramazotti (2)	DPMM	20
2017	(Japan) Tsubasa Sano	Albirex Niigata (S)	26
Singapore Premier League era
2018	(Japan) Shuhei Hoshino	Albirex Niigata (S)	19
2019	(Belarus) Andrei Varankou	Brunei DPMM	21
2020	(Croatia) Stipe Plazibat	Hougang United, Lion City Sailors	14
2021	(Japan) Tomoyuki Doi	Hougang United	19
2022	(Montenegro) Boris Kopitović	Tampines Rovers	35
2023	(Belgium) Maxime Lestienne	Lion City Sailors	25
2024–25	(Japan) Tomoyuki Doi (2)	Geylang International	**44**
2025–26	(Japan) Shingo Nakano	Albirex Niigata (S)	20

* Mirko Grabovac was a naturalised Singapore player from 2002 until he renounced his Singapore citizenship in 2008.

^ Goals in all domestic competitions, including the S.League and Singapore Cup.

Note: Bold denotes that player is holding the Singapore Premier League record

Source:"S.League leading scorers". S.League.

=== Awards won by nationality ===
Country	Players	Total
Singapore	2	7
Japan	4	5
Croatia	3	5
Brazil	3	4
France	1	2
England	1	1
Morocco	1	1
Bosnia and Herzegovina	1	1
South Korea	1	1
Belarus	1	1
Montenegro	1	1
Belgium	1	1

== Golden Gloves ==
The Golden Gloves Award is presented annually to the best-performing goalkeeper in the Singapore Premier League. The award recognises outstanding shot-stopping ability, consistency, leadership, and overall defensive contributions throughout the season. Considered one of the league’s key individual honors, it celebrates goalkeepers who have played a crucial role in their club’s defensive success and overall performances.

Season	Player	Club	Clean sheets
S.League era
2009	(Singapore) Hassan Sunny	Tampines Rovers	13
2010	(France) Yohann Lacroix	Étoile	19
2011	(Singapore) Lionel Lewis	Home United	13
2012	(Japan) Takuma Ito	Albirex Niigata (S)	11
2013	(Singapore) Shahril Jantan	Home United	12
2014	(Brunei) Wardun Yussof	DPMM	7
2015	(Japan) Yōsuke Nozawa	Albirex Niigata (S)	13
2016	(Japan) Yōsuke Nozawa (2)	Albirex Niigata (S)	11
2017	(Japan) Yōsuke Nozawa (3)	Albirex Niigata (S)	12
Singapore Premier League era
2018	(Japan) Yōsuke Nozawa (4)	Albirex Niigata (S)	10
2019	(Brunei) Wardun Yussof	DPMM	10
2020	(Japan) Kei Okawa	Albirex Niigata (S)	8
2021	(Japan) Takahiro Koga	Albirex Niigata (S)	8
2022	(Singapore) Zaiful Nizam	Geylang International	9
2023	(Singapore) Syazwan Buhari	Tampines Rovers	8
2024–25	(Singapore) Syazwan Buhari (2)	Tampines Rovers	11
2025–26	(Croatia) Ivan Sušak	Lion City Sailors	10

== Young Player of the Year award ==
The Young Player of the Year Award is presented annually to the most outstanding young player in the Singapore Premier League. The award recognises emerging talent, consistent performances, technical ability, and overall contribution throughout the season. It highlights promising players who have shown significant development and have made an important impact for their club at a young age.

Season	Player	Club
S.League era
1996	(Singapore) Robin Chitrakar	Geylang United
1997	(Singapore) Ahmad Latiff Khamaruddin	Geylang United
1998	(Singapore) Lim Soon Seng	Tanjong Pagar United
1999	(Singapore) Yazid Yasin	Home United
2000	(Singapore) Indra Sahdan Daud	Geylang United
2001	(Singapore) Indra Sahdan Daud (2)	Home United
2002	(Singapore) Noh Alam Shah	Sembawang Rangers
2003	(Singapore) Baihakki Khaizan	Geylang United
2004	(Serbia) Fahrudin Mustafić*	Tampines Rovers
2005	(Canada) Issey Nakajima-Farran	Albirex Niigata (S)
2006	(Cameroon) Kengne Ludovick	Balestier Khalsa
2007	(Singapore) Shariff Abdul Samat	Tampines Rovers
2008	(Singapore) Khairul Amri	Tampines Rovers
2009	(Nigeria) Gabriel Obatola	Gombak United
2010	(Singapore) Hariss Harun	Young Lions
2011	(Japan) Tatsuro Inui	Albirex Niigata (S)
2012	(Malaysia) Wan Zack Haikal	Harimau Muda A
2013	(France) Sirina Camara	Home United
2014	(Argentina) Nicolás Vélez	Warriors
2015	(Brunei) Azwan Ali	DPMM
2016	(Singapore) Anumanthan Kumar	Hougang United
2017	(Singapore) Hazzuwan Halim	Balestier Khalsa
Singapore Premier League era
2018	(Singapore) Adam Swandi	Albirex Niigata (S)
2019	(Singapore) Hami Syahin	Home United
2020	(Singapore) Saifullah Akbar	Lion City Sailors
2021	(Singapore) Nur Adam Abdullah	Lion City Sailors
2022	(Singapore) Ilhan Fandi	Albirex Niigata (S)
2023	(Japan) Seia Kunori	Albirex Niigata (S)
2024–25	(Japan) Seia Kunori (2)	Tampines Rovers
2025–26	(Japan) Shingo Nakano	Albirex Niigata (S)

* Fahrudin Mustafić held Serbian citizenship before being naturalised to play for Singapore in 2007.

== Coach of the Year award ==
The Coach of the Year Award is presented annually to the most outstanding head coach in the Singapore Premier League. The award recognises tactical excellence, leadership, team development, and overall achievement throughout the season. It is awarded to the coach who has most significantly influenced their team’s performance, often reflecting success in league standings, consistency, and improvement over the course of the campaign.

Season	Name	Club
S.League era
1996	(Singapore) Vincent Subramaniam	Singapore Armed Forces
1997	(Singapore) Vincent Subramaniam (2)	Singapore Armed Forces
1998	(Singapore) Jita Singh	Sembawang Rangers
1999	(Netherlands) Robert Alberts	Home United
2000	(Singapore) Fandi Ahmad	Singapore Armed Forces
2001	(South Korea) Jang Jung	Geylang United
2002	(Malaysia) M. Karathu	Woodlands Wellington
2003	(Australia) Scott O'Donell	Geylang United
2004	(Thailand) Vorawan Chitavanich	Tampines Rovers
2005	(Thailand) Vorawan Chitavanich (2)	Tampines Rovers
2006	(Singapore) Richard Bok	Singapore Armed Forces
2007	(Singapore) Richard Bok (2)	Singapore Armed Forces
2008	(Japan) Hiroaki Hiraoka	Albirex Niigata (S)
2009	(Singapore) Richard Bok (3)	Singapore Armed Forces
2010	(Thailand) Vorawan Chitavanich (3)	Tampines Rovers
2011	(Japan) Koichi Sugiyama	Albirex Niigata (S)
2012	(Croatia) Vjeran Simunić	DPMM
2013	(South Korea) Lee Lim-Saeng	Home United
2014	(Croatia) Marko Kraljević	Balestier Khalsa
2015	(Scotland) Steve Kean	DPMM
2016	(Japan) Naoki Naruo	Albirex Niigata (S)
2017	(Japan) Kazuaki Yoshinaga	Albirex Niigata (S)
Singapore Premier League era
2018	(Japan) Kazuaki Yoshinaga (2)	Albirex Niigata (S)
2019	(England) Adrian Pennock	DPMM
2020	(Japan) Keiji Shigetomi	Albirex Niigata (S)
2021	(Singapore) Clement Teo	Hougang United
2022	(Japan) Kazuaki Yoshinaga (3)	Albirex Niigata (S)
2023	(Japan) Kazuaki Yoshinaga (4)	Albirex Niigata (S)
2024–25	(Serbia) Aleksandar Ranković	Lion City Sailors
2025–26	(Japan) Keiji Shigetomi	Albirex Niigata (S)

== Goal of the Year Award ==
Season	Name	Club	Against
2008	(Morocco) Abdelhadi Laakkad	Woodlands Wellington	Young Lions (23 February 2008)
2009	(Singapore) Ahmad Latiff	Singapore Armed Forces	Albirex Niigata (S) (26 March 2009)
2010	(Singapore) Shahril Ishak	Home United	Singapore Armed Forces (16 July 2010)
2015	(Japan) Shotaro Ihata	Albirex Niigata (S)	Balestier Khalsa (20 March 2015)
2016	(Japan) Tomoki Menda	Albirex Niigata (S)	Young Lions (11 August 2016)
2017	(Singapore) Huzaifah Aziz	Balestier Khalsa	Young Lions (20 September 2017)
2018	(Singapore) Zulfadhmi Suzliman	Tampines Rovers	Albirex Niigata (S) (20 May 2018)
2019	(Netherlands) Barry Maguire	Geylang International	Young Lions (30 August 2019)
2020	(Singapore) Khairul Nizam	Geylang International	Tampines Rovers (7 November 2020)
2021	(Singapore) Gabriel Quak	Lion City Sailors	Balestier Khalsa (18 April 2021)
2022	(Singapore) Ilhan Fandi	Albirex Niigata (S)	Balestier Khalsa (16 July 2022)
2023	(Singapore) Khairul Amri	Tanjong Pagar United	Hougang United (6 April 2023)
2024–25	(Singapore) Shawal Anuar	Lion City Sailors	Tampines Rovers (29 September 2024)
2025–26	(Singapore) Huzaifah Aziz	Hougang United	Lion City Sailors (12 April 2026)

== Team of the Year ==
Season	Goalkeepers	Defenders	Midfielders	Forwards
2017	(Japan) Yōsuke Nozawa	(Singapore) Irfan Fandi (Japan) Yasutaka Yanagi (Japan) Naofumi Tanaka	(Japan) Ryutaro Megumi (Japan) Shuto Inaba (Singapore) Shahril Ishak (Japan) Kento Nagasaki	(Singapore) Faris Ramli (Croatia) Stipe Plazibat (Japan) Tsubasa Sano
2018	(Japan) Yōsuke Nozawa	(Japan) Riku Moriyasu (Japan) Shuhei Sasahara (Japan) Kento Fukuda (Japan) Kenya Takahashi	(Singapore) Hafiz Nor (Japan) Wataru Murofushi (South Korea) Song Ui-young (Singapore) Adam Swandi	(Singapore) Shahril Ishak (Japan) Shuhei Hoshino
2019	(Brunei) Wardun Yussof	(Singapore) Nazrul Nazari (Japan) Kaishu Yamazaki (England) Charlie Clough (Singapore) Irwan Shah	(Australia) Blake Ricciuto (Japan) Kyoga Nakamura (Singapore) Shahdan Sulaiman	(Singapore) Shawal Anuar (Singapore) Faris Ramli (Belarus) Andrei Varankou
2020	(Singapore) Syazwan Buhari	(Singapore) Tajeli Salamat (Japan) Kazuki Hashioka (Japan) Kaishu Yamazaki (Singapore) Daniel Bennett	(Croatia) Kristijan Krajcek (Japan) Kyoga Nakamura (Singapore) Gabriel Quak (South Korea) Song Ui-young	(Brazil) Luiz Júnior (Croatia) Stipe Plazibat
2021	(Japan) Takahiro Koga	(Japan) Kazuki Hashioka (Japan) Shuya Yamashita (Brazil) Jorge Fellipe (Singapore) Nur Adam Abdullah	(Japan) Kaishu Yamazaki (Japan) Ryoya Tanigushi (Singapore) Shahdan Sulaiman	(Croatia) Šime Žužul (Croatia) Stipe Plazibat (Japan) Tomoyuki Doi
2022	(Singapore) Zaiful Nizam	(Japan) Masaya Idetsu (Brazil) Pedro Henrique (Singapore) Joshua Pereira	(Japan) Kyoga Nakamura (France) Vincent Bezecourt (Brazil) Diego Lopes (Belgium) Maxime Lestienne	(Japan) Kodai Tanaka (Singapore) Ilhan Fandi (Montenegro) Boris Kopitović
2023	(Singapore) Syazwan Buhari	(Serbia) Miloš Zlatković (Japan) Koki Kawachi (Japan) Asahi Yokokawa	(Belgium) Maxime Lestienne (Japan) Kyoga Nakamura (Brazil) Diego Lopes (Japan) Ryoya Taniguchi	(Brunei) Hakeme Yazid (Japan) Seia Kunori (Singapore) Shawal Anuar
2024–25	(Singapore) Syazwan Buhari	(Croatia) Toni Datković (Australia) Bailey Wright (Serbia) Miloš Zlatković	(Belgium) Maxime Lestienne (Netherlands) Bart Ramselaar (France) Vincent Bezecourt (Japan) Seia Kunori	(Germany) Lennart Thy (Singapore) Shawal Anuar (Japan) Tomoyuki Doi
2025–26	(Croatia) Ivan Sušak	(Croatia) Toni Datković (Australia) Bailey Wright (Japan) Takeshi Yoshimoto	(Japan) Yuki Kobayashi (Japan) Koya Kazama (Singapore) Shah Shahiran (Netherlands) Bart Ramselaar	(Japan) Hide Higashikawa (Japan) Shingo Nakano (Germany) Lennart Thy

Song Ui-Young held South Korea citizenship before being naturalised to play for Singapore in 2021

=== Total awards ===
Rank	Player	Wins
1	(Japan) Kyoga Nakamura	4
3	(Japan) Kaishu Yamazaki	3
3	(Croatia) Stipe Plazibat	3
3	(Singapore) Syazwan Buhari	3
3	(Belgium) Maxime Lestienne	3
3	(Singapore) Shawal Anuar	3
4	(Singapore) Faris Ramli	2
4	(Singapore) Shahril Ishak	2
4	(Japan) Tomoyuki Doi	2
4	(Singapore) Shahdan Sulaiman	2
4	(Japan) Yōsuke Nozawa	2
4	(Japan) Ryoya Taniguchi	2
4	(South Korea) Song Ui-young	2
4	(France) Vincent Bezecourt	2
4	(Brazil) Diego Lopes	2
4	(Serbia) Miloš Zlatković	2
4	(Netherlands) Bart Ramselaar	2
4	(Croatia) Toni Datković	2
4	(Australia) Bailey Wright	2
4	(Germany) Lennart Thy	2

== League winning coach and captain ==
Season	Coach	Captain	Club
1996	(Iran) Jalal Talebi	(Singapore) David Lee	Geylang United
1997	(Singapore) Vincent Subramaniam	(Singapore) Fandi Ahmad	Singapore Armed Forces
1998	(Singapore) Vincent Subramaniam (2)	(Singapore) Fandi Ahmad (2)	Singapore Armed Forces (2)
1999	(Netherlands) Robert Alberts	(Hungary) Zsolt Bücs	Home United
2000	(Singapore) Fandi Ahmad	(Singapore) Nazri Nasir	Singapore Armed Forces (3)
2001	(South Korea) Jang Jung	(Singapore) Zulkarnaen Zainal	Geylang United (2)
2002	(Singapore) Fandi Ahmad (2)	(Singapore) Rezal Hassan	Singapore Armed Forces (4)
2003	(England) Steve Darby	(Singapore) Shunmugham Subramani	Home United (2)
2004	(Thailand) Vorawan Chitavanich	(Singapore) Nazri Nasir (2)	Tampines Rovers
2005	(Thailand) Vorawan Chitavanich	(Singapore) Nazri Nasir (3)	Tampines Rovers (2)
2006	(Singapore) Richard Bok	(Singapore) Mohd Noor Ali	Singapore Armed Forces (5)
2007	(Singapore) Richard Bok (2)	(Singapore) Mohd Noor Ali (2)	Singapore Armed Forces (6)
2008	(Singapore) Richard Bok (3)	(Singapore) Aleksandar Đurić	Singapore Armed Forces (7)
2009	(Singapore) Richard Bok (4)	(Singapore) Aleksandar Đurić (2)	Singapore Armed Forces (8)
2010	(France) Patrick Vallée	(France) Matthias Verschave	Étoile
2011	(Singapore) Steven Tan	(Singapore) Aleksandar Đurić (3)	Tampines Rovers (3)
2012	(Singapore) Tay Peng Kee	(Singapore) Aleksandar Đurić (4)	Tampines Rovers (4)
2013	(Singapore) Tay Peng Kee (2)	(Singapore) Fahrudin Mustafić	Tampines Rovers (5)
2014	(England) Alex Weaver	(Singapore) Daniel Bennett	Warriors (9)
2015	(Scotland) Steve Kean	(Brunei) Rosmin Kamis	DPMM
2016	(Japan) Naoki Naruo	(Japan) Yōsuke Nozawa	Albirex Niigata (S)
2017	(Japan) Kazuaki Yoshinaga	(Japan) Kento Nagasaki	Albirex Niigata (S) (2)
2018	(Japan) Kazuaki Yoshinaga (2)	(Japan) Wataru Murofushi	Albirex Niigata (S)
2019	(England) Adrian Pennock	(Brunei) Wardun Yussof	DPMM (2)
2020	(Japan) Keiji Shigetomi	(Japan) Kazuki Hashioka	Albirex Niigata (S) (4)
2021	(South Korea) Kim Do-hoon	(Singapore) Hassan Sunny	Lion City Sailors (3)
2022	(Japan) Kazuaki Yoshinaga (3)	(Japan) Jun Kobayashi	Albirex Niigata (S) (5)
2023	(Japan) Kazuaki Yoshinaga (4)	(Japan) Asahi Yokokawa	Albirex Niigata (S) (6)
2024–25	(Serbia) Aleksandar Ranković	(Singapore) Hariss Harun	Lion City Sailors (4)
2025–26	(Spain) Jesús Casas	(Singapore) Hariss Harun (2)	Lion City Sailors (5)

== Fair Play Award ==
Season	Club
1996	Singapore Armed Forces
1997	Singapore Armed Forces
1998	Singapore Armed Forces
1999	Geylang United
2000	Sembawang Rangers
2001	Singapore Armed Forces
2002	Singapore Armed Forces
2003	Young Lions
2004	Albirex Niigata (S)
2005	Young Lions
2006	Young Lions
2007	Albirex Niigata (S)
2008	Super Reds
2009	Home United
2010	Tampines Rovers
2011	Albirex Niigata (S)
2012	Albirex Niigata (S)
2013	Albirex Niigata (S)
2014	Geylang International
2015	Geylang International
2016	Albirex Niigata (S)
2017	Albirex Niigata (S)
2018	Albirex Niigata (S)
2019	Albirex Niigata (S)
2020	Albirex Niigata (S)
2021	Albirex Niigata (S)
2022	Albirex Niigata (S)
2023	Albirex Niigata (S)
2024–25	Tampines Rovers
2025–26	Tampines Rovers

== Unofficial awards ==
=== Top assists ===
Season	Name	Club	Assists
2019	(Belarus) Andrey Varankow	DPMM	10
2020	(Singapore) Gabriel Quak	Lion City Sailors	7
2021	(Montenegro) Armin Bošnjak	Tampines Rovers	11
2022	(Belgium) Maxime Lestienne	Lion City Sailors	23
2023	(Belgium) Maxime Lestienne	Lion City Sailors	21
2024–25	(Belgium) Maxime Lestienne	Lion City Sailors	22
2025–26	(Japan) Koya Kazama	Tampines Rovers	14

== Special awards ==
=== 100 S.League goals ===
Season	Name	Club
2002	(Singapore) Mirko Grabovac	Singapore Armed Forces
2003	(Singapore) Indra Sahdan Daud	Home United
2003	(Bosnia and Herzegovina) (Australia) Aleksandar Đurić*	Geylang United
2004	(Singapore) Egmar Goncalves	Home United
2005	(Singapore) Noh Alam Shah	Tampines Rovers
2005	(Brazil) Peres De Oliveira	Home United
2007	(Singapore) Agu Casmir	Gombak United
2008	(South Korea) Park Tae-Won	Woodlands Wellington
2010	(Singapore) Mohd Noor Ali	Woodlands Wellington
2014	(Singapore) Qiu Li	Balestier Khalsa
2020	(Canada) Jordan Webb	Tampines Rovers

Aleksandar Đurić became a naturalised Singapore player in 2007.

=== 200 S.League goals ===
Season	Name	Club
2005	(Singapore) Mirko Grabovac*	Tampines Rovers
2007	(Singapore) Aleksandar Đurić	Singapore Armed Forces

Mirko Grabovac was a Singaporean when he won the 200 S.League Goals award in 2005.

=== 300 S.League goals ===
Season	Name	Club
2010	(Singapore) Aleksandar Đurić	Tampines Rovers

== Defunct award ==
=== Manager of the Year ===
Season	Name	Club
1996	P. N. Sivaji	Tanjong Pagar United
1997	Chris Chan	Singapore Armed Forces
1998	Alan Wong	Gombak United
1999	Kok Wai Leong	Singapore Armed Forces
2000	John Yap	Gombak United
2001	Noordin Abdul Rahman	Home United
2002	Alfred Loi	Sembawang Rangers

=== People's Choice Award ===
Season	Name	Club
2002	(Serbia) Sead Muratović	Tampines Rovers
2003	(Singapore) Indra Sahdan Daud	Home United
2004	(Singapore) Agu Casmir	Young Lions
2005	(Singapore) Zulkarnaen Zainal	Tampines Rovers
2006	(Singapore) Khairul Amri	Young Lions
2007	(Singapore) Aleksandar Đurić	Singapore Armed Forces
2008	(Cameroon) Kengne Ludovick	Home United
2009	(Nigeria) Gabriel Obatola	Gombak United
2010	(Singapore) Shahril Jantan	Singapore Armed Forces
2011	(Singapore) Safuwan Baharudin	Young Lions
2012	(Malaysia) Wan Zack Haikal	Harimau Muda A
2013	(Guinea) Mamadou M. Diallo	Hougang United

=== Dollah Kassim Award ===
The Dollah Kassim Award is an annual award handed to the most outstanding youth player aged 18 and below. The winner will receive the Singapore Pools' Passport to Excellence prize which funds the cost of sending the recipient for an overseas training stint. Singapore Pools launched the incentive in 2010 to nurture young sports talent recognising footballing excellence and character.

Season	Name	Overseas training stints
2010	Ammirul Emmran	Newcastle United
2011	Adam Swandi	Newcastle United, Chelsea and Atlético Madrid.
2012	R. Aaravin	FC Metz
2013	Hazim Faiz	FC Metz
2014	Muhelmy Suhaimi	FC Metz
2015	Joshua Pereira	Saint-Étienne
2016	Rusyaidi Salime	Omiya Ardija
2017	Joel Chew	Omiya Ardija
2018	Nur Adam Abdullah	KRC Genk
2019	Iman Hakim	Omiya Ardija
