= Lim Soon Seng =

Singaporean footballer

Personal information
- Full name: Bernard Lim Soon Seng
- Date of birth: 2 December 1976 (age 49)
- Place of birth: Singapore
- Height: 1.80 m (5 ft 11 in)
- Position: Right wing-back

Youth career
- 1994–1996: Tiong Bahru (Note: Tiong Bahru CSC were renamed Tiong Bahru United on their entry to the S.League in 1996. They underwent a second name change to Tanjong Pagar United in 1998.)

Senior career*
Years	Team	Apps	(Gls)
1997–1999	Tanjong Pagar United		
2002	Tampines Rovers	0	(0)

International career
1998	Singapore	5	(0)
- * Club domestic league appearances and goals

Bernard Lim Soon Seng (Chinese: 林顺成; pinyin: Lín Shùnchéng; born 2 December 1976) is a former Singapore international footballer who played as a right wing-back for Tanjong Pagar United in the S.League.

Lim took up competitive football only in 1994, when he joined Tiong Bahru. He made his S.League debut in 1997 and by the following year, had established himself as a first-team player. He won the Singapore Cup and Singapore FA Cup double with the now-renamed Tanjong Pagar United in 1998, and finished league runners-up in both 1997 and 1998. His achievements won him recognition as the 1998 S.League Young Player of the Year.

His club form led to a call up to the Singapore national team for the 1998 AFF Championship in which he made his international debut against Malaysia in the opening group match. Singapore defeated Vietnam in the final to win their first international trophy.

Lim was seriously injured in an accident while riding his motorbike under the influence in January 1999. The injuries left him with impaired vision, coordination problems slower reflexes on the left side of his body and he had to undergo reconstruction of a ligament in his left knee. He attempted to make a comeback with Tampines Rovers in 2002 but was sacked by the club after he received an eight-week prison sentence in July 2002 for alleged disorderly behaviour and assaulting a police officer.

== Early life ==
Lim was born to a taxi driver and a housewife. He studied at Balestier Primary School and Thomson Secondary School before enrolling in the mechanical engineering course at Ngee Ann Polytechnic.

== Football career ==
=== Club career ===
==== Tiong Bahru ====
Lim took up competitive football only in 1994, after he approached Tiong Bahru CSC youth coach Robert Lim and joined the National Football League club. He started out as a centre-back, captaining the reserve team of the renamed S.League club Tiong Bahru United. His name 'Bernard' was conceived by first team captain Lim Tong Hai (no relation) in order to distinguish the two Lims.

Ten days after his first reserve league appearance, Lim made his S.League debut in the 81st minute of a 2–2 away draw against defending champions Geylang United on 29 March 1997. Towards the end of the season, he replaced the injured Singapore international S. Subramani in central defence. He switched to right-back after the return of Subramani and impressed head coach Robert Alberts sufficiently to retain his place as the team's first-choice right-back. The club ended as 1997 S.League runners-up behind Singapore Armed Forces.

Lim established himself as a first-team player for the renamed Tanjong Pagar United in the 1998 season. The club ended as league runners-up to Singapore Armed Forces on goal difference but achieved a Singapore Cup and Singapore FA Cup double. In the same year, Lim was honoured as the S.League Young Player of the Year. His performances led to a call-up to the Singapore national team.

After suffering a motorcycle accident in January 1999, Lim returned to light training with Tanjong Pagar United in March but sat out the entire 1999 season. He stopped training with Tanjong Pagar United after he was enlisted for National Service in September. He served National Service as a clerk; Singapore Armed Forces had the option to register him as a player but chose not to.

By March 2000, Lim was training with Gombak United. The club wanted to sign Lim but he had three months left on his contract with Tanjong Pagar United, which he had to serve after completing his National Service in February 2002. S.League rules also stated that a player cannot play for another club for the rest of the season if his contract ends midway through the season. The transfer collapsed after both clubs failed to agree on a compensation fee for the remainder of his contract.

==== Tampines Rovers ====
Lim's doctors had initially advised him against a return to football but he passed the S.League medical and was later certified medically fit in 2002. Following the end of his National Service and his release by Tanjong Pagar United, Lim signed a two-year part-time contract with Tampines Rovers in March 2002 after training with them for a month. At his request, Lim was registered as a reserve league player in order to work himself back into fitness.

Lim's playing contract was terminated by Tampines Rovers after he was arrested for alleged disorderly behaviour and assaulting a police officer.

=== International career ===
Lim received his first call-up to the Singapore squad for a training camp in May 1998. Three months later, he was named in the squad for the 1998 AFF Championship. He made his international debut coming on for the injured Aide Iskandar in the 28th minute of the group stage opening match win over Malaysia on 26 August; he assisted Ahmad Latiff Khamaruddin's goal in the 39th minute, Singapore's second goal in the 2–0 win. On 5 September, he came on in the 84th minute as Singapore defeated Vietnam in the final to clinch the AFF Championship, their first international trophy. Lim made a total of five substitute appearances during the tournament.

Lim was named in the 25-man provisional squad for the Dunhill Cup in Vietnam from 29 January to 7 February 1999, but had to withdraw from the squad after his motorbike accident.

== Outside football ==
Before 2002, Lim was working as a logistics administrator job at the Tampines Rovers chairman's company. He was sacked from his job after being arrested for alleged disorderly behaviour and assaulting a police officer.

As of December 2004, Lim was working as a property agent.

== Personal life ==
Lim met up with national teammates R. Sasikumar and Robin Chitrakar at Clarke Quay on the night of 6 January 1999 after a national team training session was cancelled due to rain. In the early morning of the following day, the trio proceeded to Newton Food Centre. At 6.07 am, Lim lost control of his motorbike under the influence near Kramal Lane and was sent to the intensive care unit at Tan Tock Seng Hospital. Lim suffered a mild stroke following an impact to his head, which left him with impaired vision, coordination problems and slower reflexes on the left side of his body. He went into a coma for a few days and was discharged after two weeks. He later underwent reconstruction of a ligament in his left knee.

On 16 June 2002, Lim was arrested for alleged disorderly behaviour and assaulting a police officer and received an eight-week prison sentence in July 2002.

== Honours ==
Tanjong Pagar United

- Singapore Cup: 1998
- Singapore FA Cup: 1998

Singapore

- AFF Championship: 1998

Individual

- S.League Young Player of the Year: 1998
