= 2017 S.League =

S.League
- Season: 2017
- Champions: (Japan) Albirex Niigata (S) (2nd title)
- Community Shield: (Japan) Albirex Niigata (S)
- AFC Champions League: Tampines Rovers (S.League runners-up)
- AFC Cup: Home United (S.League 3rd Place)
- Matches: 65
- Goals: 190 (2.92 per match)
- Top goalscorer: (Japan) Tsubasa Sano (26 goals)
- Biggest home win: Home United 9–3 (Brunei) DPMM FC (25 May 2017)
- Biggest away win: (Singapore) Young Lions 0–5 (Japan) Albirex Niigata (S) (4 March 2017) (Brunei) DPMM FC 0–5 Tampines Rovers ( 3 November 2017)
- Highest scoring: Home United 9–3 (Brunei) DPMM FC (25 May 2017)
- Longest winning run: 10 matches (Japan) Albirex Niigata (S)
- Longest unbeaten run: 11 matches (Japan) Albirex Niigata (S)
- Longest winless run: 13 matches (Singapore) Young Lions
- Longest losing run: 9 matches (Singapore) Young Lions
- All statistics correct as of 4 November 2017.

The 2017 S.League (also known as the Great Eastern Hyundai S.League for sponsorship reasons) was the 22nd season of the S.League, the top-flight Singaporean professional league for association football clubs, since its establishment in 1996. The season began on 26 February 2017, and concluded on 18 November 2017. Albirex Niigata (S) were the defending champions.

It was the final season with the "S.League" name as it was officially renamed to Singapore Premier League from the 2018 season onwards.

== Teams ==
A total of 9 teams competed in the league. Albirex Niigata (S) and DPMM FC were invited foreign clubs from Japan and Brunei respectively.

=== Stadiums and locations ===
Location of 2017 S.League teams
Locations of the 2016 S.League teams from Singapore

Team	Stadium	Capacity
(Japan) Albirex Niigata (S)	Jurong East Stadium	2,700
Balestier Khalsa	Toa Payoh Stadium	3,800
(Brunei) DPMM FC	Hassanal Bolkiah National Stadium	28,000
Geylang International	Bedok Stadium; Jalan Besar Stadium (May–September 2017)	3,800; 6,000
Home United	Bishan Stadium	3,500
Hougang United	Hougang Stadium	3,400
Tampines Rovers	Jurong West Stadium (March 2014–June 2017); Our Tampines Hub	3,200; 6,000
Warriors FC	Choa Chu Kang Stadium	4,000
(Singapore) Young Lions	Jalan Besar Stadium	6,000

- The opening game of the season which doubles up as the 2017 Singapore Community Shield was played at the National Stadium

=== Personnel and sponsors ===
Note: Flags indicate national team as has been defined under FIFA eligibility rules. Players may hold more than one non-FIFA nationality.

Team	Head coach	Captain	Kit manufacturer	Shirt sponsor
(Japan) Albirex Niigata (S)	(Japan) Kazuaki Yoshinaga	(Japan) Kento Nagasaki	Hummel	Canon
Balestier Khalsa	(Croatia) Marko Kraljević	Zaiful Nizam	Umbro	Civic
(Brunei) DPMM FC	(Scotland) Steve Kean	(Brunei) Rosmin Kamis	Lotto	–
Geylang International	Mohd Noor Ali	Isa Halim	FBT	Epson
Home United	Aidil Sharin	Hassan Sunny	Puma	Lionco Investments
Hougang United	Philippe Aw	Nurhilmi Jasni	Vonda	Green Rubber
Tampines Rovers	(Germany) Jürgen Raab	Madhu Mohana	Jako	Nogle
Warriors FC	Razif Onn	Baihakki Khaizan	Joma	Hong Seh Motors
(Singapore) Young Lions	Vincent Subramaniam	Shahrin Saberin	Nike	Shopee

=== Coaching changes ===
Team	Outgoing Head Coach	Manner of Departure	Date of Vacancy	Position in table	Incoming Head Coach	Date of appointment
Warriors FC	Razif Onn	Redesignated	NA	Pre-Season	Razif Onn	23 October 2016
Hougang United	K.Balagumaran	End of Contract	30 October 2016	Pre-Season	Philippe Aw	1 January 2017
(Japan) Albirex Niigata (S)	(Japan) Naoki Naruo	End of Contract	3 November 2016	Pre-Season	(Japan) Kazuaki Yoshinaga	2 December 2016
(Singapore) Young Lions	(France) Patrick Hesse	Resigned	9 November 2016	Pre-Season	V. Selvaraj	9 November 2016
Tampines Rovers	Akbar Nawas	Mutual Agreement	27 January 2017	Pre-Season	(Germany) Jürgen Raab	31 January 2017
(Singapore) Young Lions	V. Selvaraj	Resigned	17 May 2017	9th	(France) Richard Tardy (interim coach)	17 May 2017
Geylang International	Hasrin Jailani	Resigned	20 June 2017	5th	Mohd Noor Ali	20 June 2017
(Singapore) Young Lions	(France) Richard Tardy	End of Interim	5 July 2017	9th	Vincent Subramaniam	5 July 2017

=== Foreigners ===
For the 2017 season, Local teams (Exclusive of the Young Lions, which is a development team) and Brunei DPMM are able to register up to a total of 3 foreign players in the main squad, and an additional player under the age of 21 for the Prime League. For match-day squads in the S-League, any three foreigners can be registered.

The mid season transfer window will be opened from 22 May 2017 and closed on 18 June 2017.

Players name in bold indicates the player was registered during the mid-season transfer window.

Club	Player 1	Player 2	Player 3	Prime League	Former Players
Balestier Khalsa	(Myanmar) Kyaw Zayar Win	(Myanmar) Nanda Lin Kyaw Chit	(Myanmar) Aung Kyaw Naing	-	-
(Brunei) DPMM FC	(Brazil) Rafael Ramazotti	(Chile) **Daúd Gazale**	(Chile) **Vincent Salas**	-	(France) François Marque ***^2** (Republic of Ireland) Billy Mehmet (Serbia) Željko Savić
Geylang International	(Japan) Yuki Ichikawa	(Costa Rica) Víctor Coto Ortega	(Argentina) Ricardo Sendra	(Myanmar) Min Thi Ha	-
Home United	(South Korea) Song Ui-young	(France) Sirina Camara	(Croatia) Stipe Plazibat	(Croatia) Marijan Šuto	-
Hougang United	(Japan) Fumiya Kogure	(Japan) Atsushi Shirota	(Spain) Pablo Rodriguez	(Italy) Antonie Viterale	–
Tampines Rovers	(Japan) Ryutaro Megumi	(South Korea) Son Yong Chan	(Croatia) Ivan Dzoni	(United States) Raspreet Sandhu***^3** (United States) Diego Silvas***^4**	(England) Louis Clark ***^5**
Warriors FC	(Japan) Kento Fukuda	(Canada) Jordan Webb	(Romania) **Andrei Ciolacu**	(United States) Clay Silvas	(Republic of the Congo) (Netherlands) Joël Tshibamba

- **^1** For the 2017 season, it was decided that DPMM FC can sign an additional foreigner under the age of 21 which was not allowed in the past. However, the same rules for match day squad will still apply.
- **^2** DPMM FC announced that François Marque was dropped from the S. League squad. Although no reasons were given, it is presumed that he had suffered a long term injury in his 1st match for the team.
- **^3** Raspreet Sandhu is registered to play for AFC Cup competition only.
- **^4** Diego Silvas is registered for the S. League, taking up the Prime League slot.
- **^5** Foreign players who left their clubs or were de-registered from playing squad due to medical issues or other matters.
- Albirex Niigata (S) is an all-Japanese team and do not hire any foreigners.

== Kits ==
(Japan) Albirex Niigata (S)		Balestier Khalsa		(Brunei) DPMM FC		Geylang International	
Home	Away	Home	Away	Home	Away	Home	Away
Kit Sponsor: (Denmark) Hummel		Kit Sponsor: (England) Umbro		Kit Sponsor: (Italy) Lotto		Kit Sponsor: (Thailand) FBT	
Main Sponsor: (Japan) Canon		Main Sponsor: (Singapore) Civic		Main Sponsor: None		Main Sponsor: (Japan) Epson	

Home United		Hougang United		Tampines Rovers		Warriors FC	
Home	Away	Home	Away	Home	Away	Home	Away
Kit Sponsor: (Germany) Puma		Kit Sponsor: (Singapore) Vonda		Kit Sponsor: (Germany) Jako		Kit Sponsor: (Spain) Joma	
Main Sponsor: (Singapore) Linco Investments		Main Sponsor: (Malaysia) Green Rubber		Main Sponsor: (Taiwan) Nogle		Main Sponsor: (Singapore) Hong Seh Motors	

(Singapore) Young Lions
Home	Away
Kit Sponsor: (United States) Nike
Main Sponsor: (Singapore) Shopee

== League table ==
Pos	Team	Pld	W	D	L	GF	GA	GD	Pts	Qualification
1	(Japan) Albirex Niigata (S) (Note: The two foreign clubs – Albirex Niigata (S) and DPMM FC – as well as the Football Association of Singapore (FAS) under-21 team, Young Lions, are not eligible for any AFC competition spots.) (C)	24	20	2	2	70	16	+54	62	
2	Tampines Rovers	24	17	3	4	48	20	+28	54	Qualification to AFC Champions League Preliminary Round 1 or AFC Cup Group Stage
3	Home United	24	15	5	4	58	26	+32	50	Qualification to AFC Cup Group Stage
4	Geylang International	24	11	3	10	32	37	−5	36	
5	Warriors FC	24	9	7	8	33	36	−3	34	
6	Hougang United	24	9	3	12	24	31	−7	30	
7	Balestier Khalsa	24	5	4	15	17	33	−16	19	
8	(Brunei) DPMM FC	24	5	2	17	30	61	−31	17	
9	(Singapore) Young Lions	24	1	3	20	10	62	−52	6	

Source: S.League
Rules for classification: 1) points; 2) goal difference; 3) number of goals scored; 4) number of wins
(C) Champions

=== Positions by stage ===
Team ╲ Round	1	2	3	4	5	6	7	8	9	10	11	12	13	14	15	16	17	18	19	20	21	22	23	24
(Japan) Albirex Niigata (S)	3	2	1	1	2	1	1	1	1	1	1	1	1	1	1	1	1	1	1	1	1	1	1	1
Balestier Khalsa	6	8	7	8	6	6	7	7	7	7	7	7	7	7	7	7	7	7	7	7	7	7	7	7
(Brunei) DPMM FC	5	7	7	7	8	8	8	8	8	8	8	8	8	8	8	8	8	8	8	8	8	8	8	8
Geylang International	8	6	6	6	7	5	5	5	6	6	5	5	5	6	6	5	5	5	4	4	4	4	4	4
Home United	1	1	2	2	1	3	4	2	3	2	2	3	3	3	2	2	3	3	3	3	3	3	3	3
Hougang United	2	3	3	4	5	7	6	6	5	5	6	6	6	5	5	6	6	6	6	6	6	6	6	6
Tampines Rovers	6	5	4	5	4	4	3	3	2	3	3	2	2	2	3	3	2	2	2	2	2	2	2	2
Warriors FC	3	4	5	3	3	2	2	4	4	4	4	4	4	4	4	4	4	4	5	5	5	5	5	5
(Singapore) Young Lions	9	9	9	9	9	9	9	9	9	9	9	9	9	9	9	9	9	9	9	9	9	9	9	9

= Leader

== Results ==
Home \ Away	ALB	BAL	DPM	YLI	GEY	HOM	HOU	TAM	WAR
Albirex Niigata (S)	—	2–1	4–0	8–0	5–0	0–2	1–0	4–0	5–1
Balestier Khalsa	0–3	—	2–1	1–0	1–1	1–2	0–0	0–1	2–2
DPMM FC	0–1	1–4	—	7–1	0–1	1–3	2–0	0–1	3–5
Young Lions	0–5	0–0	N/a	—	0–2	1–2	0–1	0–4	0–0
Geylang International	2–7	2–0	2–0	2–1	—	1–3	1–1	2–3	0–2
Home United	2–2	1–0	9–3	6–1	3–0	—	2–3	0–2	1–1
Hougang United	2–1	0–1	1–2	2–0	0–1	0–2	—	0–3	0–1
Tampines Rovers	1–4	3–1	2–0	3–0	1–1	0–0	2–1	—	1–1
Warriors FC	1–2	1–0	1–0	4–3	0–1	2–1	0–2	0–1	—

Updated to match(es) played on 4 November 2017. Source:
Legend: Blue = home team win; Yellow = draw; Red = away team win.
For upcoming matches, an "a" indicates there is an article about the rivalry between the two participants.

== Season statistics ==
=== Top scorers ===
As of 18 November 2017.

Rank	Player	Club	Goals
1	(Japan) Tsubasa Sano	(Japan) Albirex Niigata (S)	26
2	(Croatia) Stipe Plazibat	Home United	25
3	(Brazil) Rafael Ramazotti	(Brunei) DPMM FC	14
4	(Japan) Ryota Nakai	(Japan) Albirex Niigata (S)	11
4	(Japan) Kento Nagasaki	(Japan) Albirex Niigata (S)	11
4	Shahril Ishak	Warriors FC	11
4	Faris Ramli	Home United	11
7	Shawal Anuar	Geylang International	9
9	Khairul Nizam	Home United	7
9	(Canada) Jordan Webb	Warriors FC	7
9	(Japan) Fumiya Kogure	Hougang United	7
9	(Japan) Ryutaro Megumi	Tampines Rovers	7

=== Clean sheets ===
As of 18 November 2017.

Rank	Player	Club	Clean Sheet
1	(Japan) Yosuke Nozawa	(Japan) Albirex Niigata (S)	12
2	Syazwan Buhari	Geylang International	9
3	Izwan Mahbud	Tampines Rovers	7

=== Hat-tricks ===
Player	For	Against	Result	Date	Reference
(Croatia) Stipe Plazibat^{4}	Home United	(Singapore) Young Lions	6–1	27 February 2017	
Faris Ramli^{4}	Home United	(Brunei) DPMM FC	9–3	25 May 2017	
(Japan) Tsubasa Sano^{5}	(Japan) Albirex Niigata (S)	(Singapore) Young Lions	8–0	26 May 2017	
(Brazil) Rafael Ramazotti	(Brunei) DPMM FC	(Singapore) Young Lions	7–1	7 October 2017	
(Brunei) Adi Said	(Brunei) DPMM FC	(Singapore) Young Lions	7–1	7 October 2017	
(Japan) Tsubasa Sano^{4}	(Japan) Albirex Niigata (S)	Warriors FC	5–1	3 November 2017	
(Japan) Tsubasa Sano	(Japan) Albirex Niigata (S)	Geylang International	7–1	17 November 2017	

Note ^{4} Player scored 4 goals ^{5} Player scored 5 goals

=== Own goals ===
Player	For	Against	Score	Date
Fadli Kamis	Balestier Khalsa	Geylang International	0–2	4 March 2017
(Brunei) Hazwan Hamzah	(Brunei) DPMM FC	Tampines Rovers	0–5	3 November 2017

=== Penalty missed ===
Player	For	Against	Date
(Croatia) Ivan Džoni	Tampines Rovers	(Japan) Albirex Niigata (S)	26 February 2017
(Croatia) Ivan Džoni	Tampines Rovers	Balestier Khalsa	11 March 2017
Faris Ramli	Home United	(Singapore) Young Lions	27 February 2017
Faris Ramli	Home United	(Singapore) Young Lions	21 May 2017
(Myanmar) Aung Kyaw Naing	Balestier Khalsa	(Singapore) Young Lions	2 April 2017
Raihan Rahman	Balestier Khalsa	(Singapore) Young Lions	20 September 2017
(Costa Rica) Víctor Coto Ortega	Geylang International	Hougang United	20 May 2017
Taufik Suparno	(Singapore) Young Lions	(Japan) Albirex Niigata (S)	26 May 2017
(Romania) Andrei Ciolacu	Warriors FC	(Brunei) DPMM FC	2 July 2017
(Chile) Daúd Gazale	(Brunei) DPMM FC	Geylang International	24 July 2017
Iqbal Hussain	Hougang United	(Singapore) Young Lions	24 October 2017

=== Discipline – club ===
As of after 23/9/2017

Rank	Club	Total	
Rank	Club	Yellow card	Red card
1	(Japan) Albirex Niigata (S)	9	3
2	Balestier Khalsa	45	6
3	(Brunei) DPMM FC	36	4
4	(Singapore) Young Lions	27	0
5	Geylang International	29	3
6	Home United	35	1
7	Hougang United	36	4
8	Tampines Rovers	38	6
9	Warriors FC	52	2

=== Discipline – player ===
Rank	Player	Club	Total	
Rank	Player	Club	Yellow card	Red card
1	(Chile) Vincent Reyes	DPMM FC	4	2
2	Hafiz Osman	Warriors FC	3	2
3	Baihakki Khaizan	Warriors FC	9	0
4	Ismadi Mukhtar	Tampines FC	2	2
5	Nazrul Nazari	Hougang United	5	1
6	Ahmad Syahir	Balestier Khalsa	8	0

1) Madhu Mohana was handed a suspended $1,000 fine for his comments on social media directed at referee Sukhbir Singh after they lost to Albirex in the Charity Shield.

2) Raihan Rahman was charged for allegedly using a racial slur on Warriors forward Jordan Webb during an S.League match between Balestier and Warriors on 28/2/2017. He was acquitted of that charge after a Football Association of Singapore Disciplinary Committee (DC) hearing.

== S.League Awards night winners ==
Awards	Winners	Club
Player of the Year	(Japan) Kento Nagasaki	(Japan) Albirex Niigata (S)
Young Player of the Year	Hazzuwan Halim	Balestier Khalsa
Coach of the Year	(Japan) Kazuaki Yoshinaga	(Japan) Albirex Niigata (S)
Top Scorer Award	(Japan) Tsubasa Sano	(Japan) Albirex Niigata (S)
Goal of the Year	Huzaifah Aziz	Balestier Khalsa (vs. Albirex)
Fair Play Award	(Japan) Albirex Niigata (S)	
Referee of the Year	Sukhbir Singh	

[[FFT Team of the Year]]
Goalkeeper	(Japan) Yosuke Nozawa (Albirex Niigata (S))			
Defence	(Singapore) Irfan Fandi (Home United)		(Japan) Yasutaka Yanagi (Albirex Niigata (S))	(Japan) Naofumi Tanaka (Albirex Niigata (S))
Midfield	(Japan) Ryutaro Megumi (Tampines Rovers)	(Japan) Shuto Inaba (Albirex Niigata (S))	(Singapore) Shahril Ishak (Warriors FC)	(Japan) Kento Nagasaki (Albirex Niigata (S))
Attack	(Singapore) Faris Ramli (Home United)		(Croatia) Stipe Plazibat (Home United)	(Japan) Tsubasa Sano (Albirex Niigata (S))

== Attendances ==
#	Football club	Average attendance
1	Albirex Niigata Singapore	3,355
2	Home United	1,774
3	Warriors FC	1,684
4	Tampines Rovers	1,647
5	Young Lions FC	1,432
6	Geylang International	1,397
7	Hougang United	1,079
8	DPMM FC	1,068
9	Balestier Khalsa	984
