= Zaiful Nizam =

Singaporean footballer

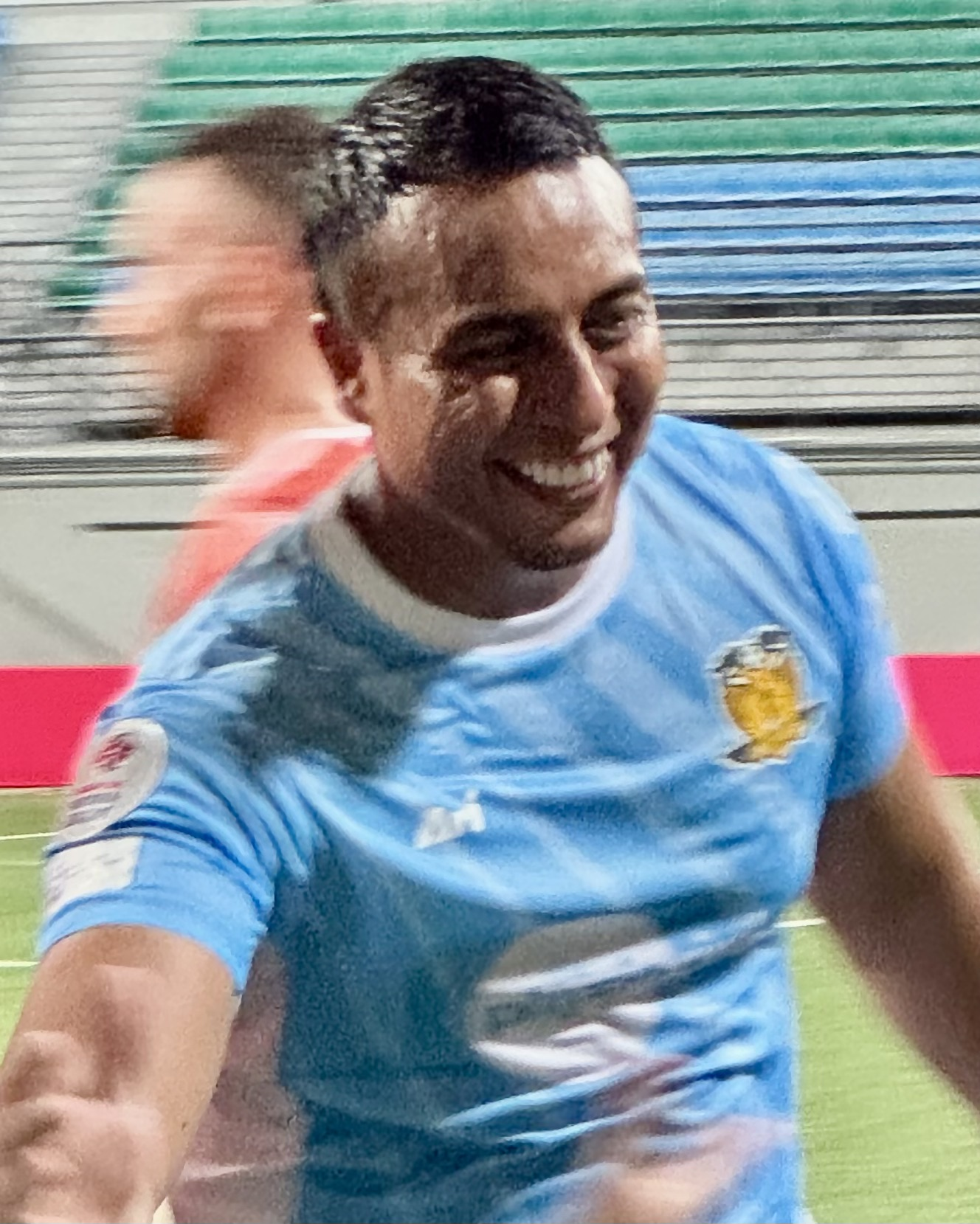
- Zaiful with Hougang in 2023

Personal information
- Full name: Zaiful Nizam bin Abdullah
- Date of birth: 24 July 1987 (age 39)
- Place of birth: Singapore
- Height: 1.75 m (5 ft 9 in)
- Position: Goalkeeper

Team information
- Current team: Tanjong Pagar United

Youth career
- National Football Academy

Senior career*
Years	Team	Apps	(Gls)
2006–2012	Gombak United	81	(0)
2013–2021	Balestier Khalsa	231	(0)
2021–2022	Geylang International	32	(0)
2023–2025	Hougang United	67	(0)
2025–	Tanjong Pagar United	11	(0)

International career^{‡}
2022	Singapore SEA Games	4	(0)
2015–2022	Singapore	5	(0)
- * Club domestic league appearances and goals as of 19 August 2017 ‡ National team caps and goals as of 24 December 2022

Zaiful Nizam bin Abdullah (born 24 July 1987), better known as Zaiful Nizam or just Zaiful, is a Singaporean professional footballer who most recently played as a goalkeeper for Singapore Premier League club Tanjong Pagar United.

Zaiful is the first goalkeeper to get an assist in the history of the AFF Championship tournament.

== Club career ==
=== Gombak United ===
Zaiful began his professional football career with Gombak United in the 2006 S. League. His stint with the bulls ended after the club has dissolved after the 2012 S.League season making 81 appearances in total.

=== Balestier Khalsa ===
In 2013, Zaiful signed for Balestier Khalsa and is the first choice which he became the captain for the team. He made his 100 capped in the first match of the 2017 S.League fixtures against Warriors. He almost scored a goal with a free kick when the team was losing 1–2 to Warriors, his free kick came close and hit the post and the game resulted in a loss.

In 2014, Zaiful won the 2014 Singapore Cup with Balestier Khalsa.

During the 2021 Singapore Premier League, Zaiful started in 13 out 15 matches for Balestier.

On 14 August 2021 against a match against the Young Lions, Zaiful who was on the bench, refused to substitute with the playing goalkeeper, Zacharial Leong during half-time. Balestier was down 4-0 at half-time. He was subsequently suspended by the club following the match. On 19 August, Balestier Khalsa terminated Zaiful. During an interview, Zaiful revealed that he refused to substitute Leong to encourage him and regretted refusing to play.

=== Geylang International ===
On 27 August 2021, Geylang International announced the signing of Zaiful as part of their goalkeeping squad.

In 2022, Zaiful won the Golden Glove during the 2022 Singapore Premier League Awards Night after keeping nine clean sheets during the 2022 Singapore Premier League season and was named in the Team of the Year.

=== Hougang United ===
Zaiful was unveiled as a Hougang United player on 17 January 2023 on the club's social medias. He made his debut on 19 February 2023 in the 2023 Singapore Community Shield in a 3-0 loss against Albirex Niigata. During the 2023–24 AFC Cup group stage match against Malaysian side, Sabah on 21 August 2023, Zaiful put on a ''Man of the Match'' performances during a heavy rain weather. On 4 June 2025, the club announced that Zaiful will depart the club after a 2 year stint with the Cheetahs.

=== Tanjong Pagar United ===
On 4 July 2025, Zaiful signed with Tanjong Pagar United.

== International career ==
Zaiful got his first international call up by Singapore's head coach Bernd Stange for friendlies against Bangladesh and Brunei on 30 May and 6 June 2015 respectively. He made his international debut against Brunei on the 60th minute, replacing Izwan Mahbud.

He finally collected his second cap for the Lions in a friendly against Fiji on 11 September 2018, replacing Hassan Sunny in the 60th minute. Zaiful then collected his 3rd cap and pulled off a series of stunning saves against Oman in the 2019 AIRMARINE Cup Final.

Zaiful made his third appearance for the national team on 23 March 2019, against Oman in the finals of the 2019 AIRMARINE Cup. He started the game and played the full 90 minutes. It eventually ended in a 1–1 draw but Singapore lost to Oman in penalties.

Zaiful was selected for the 2022 AFF Mitsubishi Electric Cup that took place in December 2022. In the opening match for the Lions against Myanmar, he was in the starting line up following first-choice Hassan Sunny's red card in the previous tournament. In the 74' min, He assisted Shawal Anuar for the winning goal with a long punt that cemented Singapore's 3–2 win. He became the first goalkeeper to get an assist in the history of the tournament .

== Others ==
=== Singapore Selection Squad ===
He was selected as part of the Singapore Selection squad for The Sultan of Selangor's Cup to be held on 6 May 2017.

== Personal life ==
Zaiful has two children.

== Career statistics ==
=== Club ===
As of match played 19 Mar 2022. Caps and goals may not be correct.

Club	League	Season	S.League		Singapore Cup		Singapore League Cup		Asia		Total	
Club	League	Season	Apps	Goals	Apps	Goals	Apps	Goals	Apps	Goals	Apps	Goals
Gombak United	S.League	2009	3	0	-	-	-	-	—		3	0
Gombak United	S.League	2010	22	0	1	0	2	0	—		25	0
Gombak United	S.League	2011	14	0	2	0	2	0	—		18	0
Gombak United	S.League	2012	21	0	6	0	3	0	—		30	0
Gombak United	S.League	Total	60	0	9	0	7	0	0	0	81	0
Balestier Khalsa	S.League	2013	22	0	6	0	3	0	—		31	0
Balestier Khalsa	S.League	2014	27	0	6	0	4	0	—		37	0
Balestier Khalsa	S.League	2015	27	0	2	0	4	0	6	0	39	0
Balestier Khalsa	S.League	2016	23	0	5	0	0	0	6	0	34	0
Balestier Khalsa	S.League	2017	0	0	0	0	0	0	—		0	0
Balestier Khalsa	Singapore Premier League	2018	24	0	4	0	0	0	—		28	0
Balestier Khalsa	Singapore Premier League	2019	5	0	0	0	0	0	—		5	0
Balestier Khalsa	Singapore Premier League	2020	14	0	0	0	0	0	—		14	0
Balestier Khalsa	Singapore Premier League	2021	15	0	0	0	0	0	—		13	0
Balestier Khalsa	Singapore Premier League	Total	155	0	23	0	11	0	12	0	231	0
Geylang International	Singapore Premier League	2021	3	0	0	0	0	0	—		3	0
Geylang International	Singapore Premier League	2022	25	0	3	0	0	0	—		28	0
Geylang International	Singapore Premier League	Total	28	0	3	0	0	0	0	0	32	0
Hougang United	Singapore Premier League	2023	22	0	6	0	1	0	5	0	34	0
Hougang United	Singapore Premier League	2024–25	0	0	0	0	0	0	0	0	0	0
Hougang United	Singapore Premier League	Total	22	0	6	0	1	0	5	0	34	0
Career Total			266	0	41	0	19	0	17	0	463	0

=== International ===
As of 19 September 2023

Singapore national team
Year	Apps	Goals
2015	1	0
2016	0	0
2017	0	0
2018	1	0
2019	1	0
2023	2	0
Total	5	0

== Honours ==
=== Clubs ===
Balestier Khalsa

- Singapore Cup: 2014
- League Cup: 2013

=== International ===
Singapore U17

- Lion City Cup: 2004

=== Individual ===
- Singapore Premier League Golden Glove: 2022
- Singapore Premier League Team of the Year: 2022
