= Indra Sahdan Daud =

Singaporean footballer

Indra Sahdan
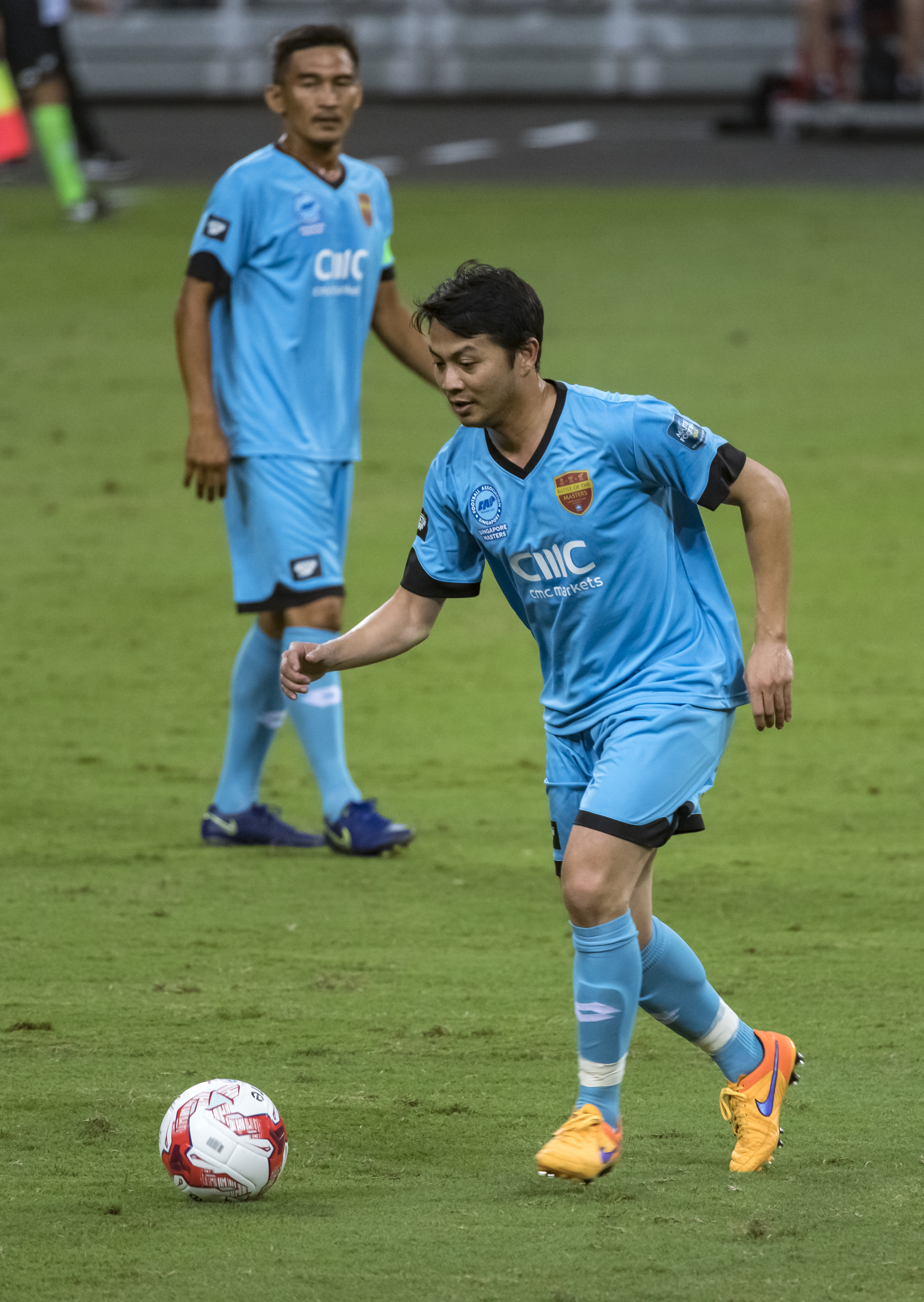
- Indra playing for Singapore Masters against Arsenal Masters in 2017

Personal information
- Full name: Indra Sahdan bin Daud
- Date of birth: 5 March 1979 (age 47)
- Place of birth: Singapore
- Height: 1.72 m (5 ft 7 1/2 in)
- Position: Forward

Team information
- Current team: Tanjong Pagar United (Assistant Coach)

Youth career
- 1995: Police

Senior career*
Years	Team	Apps	(Gls)
1996	Police	15	(3)
1997–2000	Geylang United	66	(24)
2001–2008	Home United	198	(117)
2009	Sengkang Punggol	26	(7)
2010–2011	Singapore Armed Forces	47	(16)
2012	Keppel Monaco	7	(3)
2012–2014	Home United	43	(9)
2015	Tampines Rovers	19	(2)
2016	Geylang International	5	(0)
Total		426	(181)

International career
1997–2013	Singapore	113	(31)

Managerial career
- 2023–2025: Balestier Khalsa U21
- 2025–2026: Balestier Khalsa (assistant)
- 2026–: Tanjong Pagar United (assistant)
- * Club domestic league appearances and goals

Indra Sahdan bin Daud (born 5 March 1979) is a former Singapore international footballer who played as a forward who is currently the assistant coach of Singapore Premier League club Tanjong Pagar United. He previously played for S.League clubs Geylang United, Home United, Sengkang Punggol and Singapore Armed Forces. He is known for his knack for scoring goals in big matches as well as being a pacy player in his earlier years.

== Club career ==
=== Youth career ===
Indra rose to prominence when he captained Singapore in winning the 1995 Lion City Cup. His breakthrough performances led him to be labelled the "next Fandi Ahmad".

=== Home United ===
He debuted as a 16-year-old with Police FC (later renamed Home United) in the inaugural S.League where he was used as a back-up player. Indra subsequently decided to move to Geylang United in 1997, spending four seasons with the 1996 champions.

Indra signed a five-year contract with Home United from the 2001 season. Along with his football commitments with Home United, Indra signed on with the Singapore Police Force as a police officer. He struck up a prolific partnership with Egmar Goncalves as Home United won one S.League title and three Singapore Cups. Recognition of his potential came as he won the S.League Young Player of the Year award in 2000 and 2001. He demonstrated his knack for scoring against top teams such as Uruguay, Japan, Denmark and Manchester United. During Manchester United's pre-season Far East tour in 2001, he scored Team Singapore's only goal in their 1–8 defeat at the National Stadium on 24 July.

He became the first local player to reach a milestone 100 domestic goals in Home United's 4–0 win over Balestier Khalsa on 21 June 2003 (Note: Prior to the 2011 season, milestone goals include both S.League and Singapore Cup goals. The FAS amended it to include only league goals in 2011.) Despite reported interest from Sheffield Wednesday and Ipswich Town in August 2003, a move to England did not materialise. However, he tasted success with Home United achieving a S.League and Singapore Cup double that year. Along with teammate Sutee Suksomkit, he was sent for a 2-week training stint with Chelsea's reserve team in December 2003 as part of a deal with club sponsor Emirates.

In 2005, Indra rejected an offer of US$5,000 (S$8,520) per month from Malaysia Super League club Perak, choosing to extend his contract with Home United til the end of the 2008 season. With the new deal, he became Singapore highest-paid local player with an annual wage in excess of S$100,000. He also renewed his contract with the Police Force for another five years.

He damaged the anterior cruciate ligament in his left knee during international duty in May 2006 that ruled him out for the remainder of the season.

=== Trial with Real Salt Lake ===
Indra underwent a trial with the American MLS club Real Salt Lake in Miami, Florida from 14 to 24 Feb 2008. He scored two goals in four starts. The Home United striker was then invited to join Real Salt Lake on their two weeks pre-season tour to Rosario, Argentina, beginning on 1 March, for three exhibition matches. Prior to the trip to Argentina Indra's friend, Dave Roberts, who helped arrange the trial was quoted to describe his chances of getting the contract as "very good", after his conversation with the club's general manager, Garth Lagerway. However Indra suffered a knee injury in Argentina and was not offered a contract by coach Jason Kreis. Had the transfer gone through, he would have become Singapore's only third footballer to be playing professionally outside of Asia, following Fandi Ahmad and V. Sundramoorthy.

=== Sengkang Punggol ===
In 2008, Indra was having problems scoring for Home United with just 10 goals in the league all season. After the 2008 AFF Championship, Indra's contract with Home United expired at the end of 2008. He went for trials with two V.League clubs and one First Division club. He rejected a contract offer from Vietnamese club Hoa Phat, citing issues with the accommodation and food. He returned to Singapore but was left in limbo as Home United had signed his replacement, and that he would have to resign from the Singapore Police Force if he was to join another S.League club. He eventually quit his police job and joined Sengkang Punggol for the 2009 season. Indra was temporarily handed the armband as regular captain Aide Iskandar was promoted to caretaker coach. He made his debut for Sengkang Punggol in a 2–2 draw against Super Reds. He suffered his first career dismissal after he elbowed an Albirex Niigata (S) player only 10 minutes into the game. Albirex Niigata eventually won 2–1.

=== SAFFC ===
Indra was signed by Singapore Armed Forces in 2010. He reached a milestone 200 domestic goals in March 2011 with two goals in the club's 5–0 win over Woodlands Wellington.

=== Back to the Protectors ===
After he was released by Singapore Armed Forces at the end of 2011, Indra signed with National Football League amateur side Keppel Monaco for the 2012 season. Home United head coach Lee Lim-Saeng was however, soon convinced by his pre-season performances and "his intelligence on and off the ball" to sign him for a second spell with the Protectors in February 2012. Due to his advanced years and loss of pace, he was deployed as a second striker and in midfield. He retired at the end of the 2014 season.

=== Tampines Rovers ===
On 15 February 2015, Indra came out of retirement and joined Tampines Rovers. On 17 April, Indra scored his first goal for the stags in a 2-3 loss to former club Warriors FC.

=== Geylang International ===
After leaving Tampines Rovers, Indra rejoined Geylang International for the 2016 season.

== International career ==
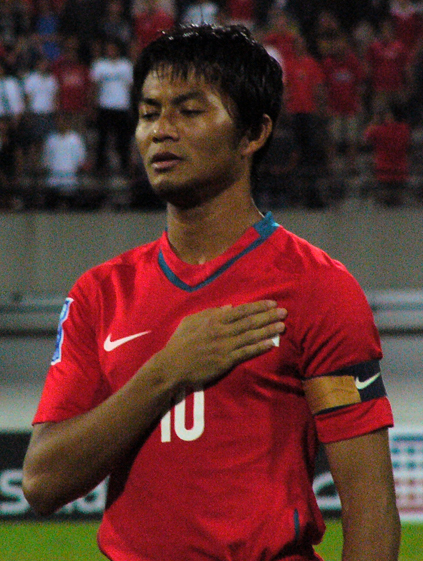
Indra Sahdan captaining the Singapore national team.

Indra made his debut for the Singapore national team in a World Cup qualifier against Kuwait on 26 April 1997.

Considered one of the best strikers to play for Singapore over the last decade, Indra is noted for finding the net in big games, scoring goals against higher-ranked nations like Uruguay and Japan.

Indra was part of the Singapore squad for the 2004 AFF Championship. Despite failing to strike up a partnership with Agu Casmir, he ended up scoring the opener in the home leg of the 2004 AFF Championship as Singapore won the tournament. It was their second ASEAN title after 1998, in which Indra missed after he was dropped from the national squad for skipping training.

While playing for the national team against Malaysia in May 2006, Indra suffered a knee injury which sidelined him for the rest of the league season. He made his return to the national team for the 2006 King's Cup in December and the 2007 AFF Championship in early 2007. The Lions won their second consecutive ASEAN title.

With national team captain, Aide Iskandar dropped from the national side for the friendly against UAE, Indra took over the armband and led the side to a 1–1 draw. Just hours before the kick off of the 2010 World Cup 2010 qualifier against Tajikistan on 9 November 2007, Aide Iskandar sensationally retired from international football. Indra was appointed the new captain.

Indra is an inductee of the FIFA Century Club.

Following the appointment of Bernd Stange as national head coach, Indra was recalled to the national team after a three-year absence following his apparent international retirement in 2010 to face Myanmar in an away friendly on 4 June 2013. He started the match as captain, earning his 110th cap as the team won 2–0. Three days later, he scored his 31st international goal in a 5–2 win over Laos. His return to the national team was cut short four matches in when he suffered a leg break against Hong Kong on 10 September 2013.

== Manager career ==
In January 2022, Indra was recruited as one of the backroom staff as a video analyst for Tanjong Pagar United working under head coach Hasrin Jailani.

In January 2023, Indra was then recruited by Balestier Khalsa to coach their under-21 side where later he became the club assistant coach in 2025 ahead of the 2025–26 season working under Marko Kraljević.

== Personal life ==
Indra was born to father Daud Bidin, a technician and mother Sabariah Hambali, a nurse.

He was married to Nur Elfa Aishah. They divorced after eight years of marriage. Daughter, Elsa and son, Ilyas Shakeil were from his previous marriage.

Indra studied at St Andrew's School, St. Gabriel's Secondary School and ITE (Ang Mo Kio).

He was the face of Nike (Singapore) together with other national team players like Khairul Amri and Hariss Harun as part of Nike's advertising campaigns such as the 2007 AFF Championship.

== Career statistics ==
=== Club ===
As of match played 17 April 2014

Club	Season	S.League		Singapore Cup		League Cup		ACL		AFC Cup		Total	
Club	Season	Apps	Goals	Apps	Goals	Apps	Goals	Apps	Goals	Apps	Goals	Apps	Goals
Police	1996	-	-	-	-	—		—		—		0	0
Police	Total	0	0	0	0	0	0	0	0	0	0	0	0
Geylang United	1997	-	-	-	-	—		-	-	—		0	0
Geylang United	1998	9	1	-	-	—		—		—		9	1
Geylang United	1999	-	-	-	-	—		—		—		0	0
Geylang United	2000	36	14	-	-	—		—		—		36	14
Geylang United	Total	36	14	0	0	0	0	0	0	0	0	36	14
Home United	2001	34	21	-	-	—		—		—		34	21
Home United	2002	32	19	-	-	—		-	-	—		32	19
Home United	2003	27	20	-	-	—		—		—		27	20
Home United	2004	24	19	-	-	—		—		-	-	24	19
Home United	2005	26	20	-	-	—		—		-	-	26	20
Home United	2006	4	1	-	-	—		—		-	-	4	1
Home United	2007	25	7	-	-	-	-	—		-	-	25	7
Home United	2008	25	10	-	-	-	-	—		-	-	25	10
Home United	Total	197	117	0	0	0	0	0	0	0	0	197	117
Sengkang Punggol	2009	26	7	1	0	2	2	—		—		29	9
Sengkang Punggol	Total	26	7	1	0	2	2	0	0	0	0	29	9
Singapore; Armed Forces	2010	21	10	1	0	1	0	8	1	—		31	11
Singapore; Armed Forces	2011	26	6	3	1	1	1	—		—		30	8
Singapore; Armed Forces	Total	47	16	4	1	2	1	8	1	0	0	61	19
Club	Season	NFL										Total	
Keppel Monaco	2012	-	-	-	-	-	-	—		—		0	0
Keppel Monaco	Total	0	0	0	0	0	0	0	0	0	0	0	0
Club	Season	S.League		Singapore Cup		League Cup		ACL		AFC Cup		Total	
Home United	2012	21	2	3	0	3	3	—		7	1	34	6
Home United	2013	19	4	3	1	1	0	—		—		23	5
Home United	2014	3	0	-	-	-	-	—		2	1	5	1
Home United	Total	43	6	6	1	4	3	0	0	9	2	62	12
Career Total		323	160	11	2	8	6	8	1	9	2	359	171

( – ) indicates unavailable referenced data conforming to reliable sources guidelines.

- The inaugural Singapore League Cup was held in 2007.
- The inaugural AFC Cup was held in 2004.

=== International ===
International goals

No.	Date	Venue	Opponent	Score	Result	Competition
1	4 August 1999	Belapan, Bandar Seri Begawan, Brunei	Brunei	0–1	1–3	1999 SEA Games
2	4 August 1999	Belapan, Bandar Seri Begawan, Brunei	Brunei	0–2	1–3	1999 SEA Games
3	6 August 1999	Berakas Sports Complex, Bandar Seri Begawan, Brunei	Indonesia	1–1	1–1	1999 SEA Games
4	28 October 2000	Singapore	Sri Lanka		4–0	Friendly
5	22 May 2001	Bishan Stadium, Bishan, Singapore	New Zealand	1–0	3–0	Friendly
6	22 May 2001	Bishan Stadium, Bishan, Singapore	New Zealand	3–0	3–0	Friendly
7	21 May 2002	National Stadium, Kallang, Singapore	Uruguay	1–2	1–2	Friendly
8	11 December 2002	Singapore	Philippines	2–0	2–0	Friendly
9	4 March 2003	Singapore	Maldives		4–1	Friendly
10	23 March 2003	Singapore	Macau	2–0	2–0	2004 AFC Asian Cup qualification
11	25 March 2003	Singapore	Pakistan	1–0	3–0	2004 AFC Asian Cup qualification
12	25 March 2003	Singapore	Pakistan	2–0	3–0	2004 AFC Asian Cup qualification
13	4 August 2003	Jalan Besar Stadium, Jalan Besar, Singapore	Hong Kong		4–1	Friendly
14	4 August 2003	Jalan Besar Stadium, Jalan Besar, Singapore	Hong Kong		4–1	Friendly
15	16 September 2003	Bishan Stadium, Bishan, Singapore	Oman	1–2	1–3	Friendly
16	31 March 2004	Jalan Besar Stadium, Jalan Besar, Singapore	Japan	1–1	1–2	2006 FIFA World Cup qualification
17	4 September 2004	Jalan Besar Stadium, Jalan Besar, Singapore	Indonesia	2–0	2–0	Friendly
18	13 October 2004	Jalan Besar Stadium, Jalan Besar, Singapore	India	1–0	2–0	2006 FIFA World Cup qualification
19	7 December 2004	Thong Nhat Stadium, Ho Chi Minh City, Vietnam	Vietnam	1–1	1–1	2004 AFF Championship
20	13 December 2004	Mỹ Đình National Stadium, Hanoi, Vietnam	Laos	2–0	6–2	2004 AFF Championship
21	13 December 2004	Mỹ Đình National Stadium, Hanoi, Vietnam	Laos	5–2	6–2	2004 AFF Championship
22	16 January 2005	National Stadium, Kallang, Singapore	Indonesia	1–0	2–1	2004 AFF Championship
23	26 January 2006	Jalan Besar Stadium, Jalan Besar, Singapore	Denmark	1–2	1–2	Friendly
24	3 February 2006	Kuwait National Stadium, Kuwait City, Kuwait	Kuwait	2–2	2–2	Friendly
25	7 January 2007	Jalan Besar Stadium, Jalan Besar, Singapore	Philippines	3–1	4–1	Friendly
26	7 January 2007	Jalan Besar Stadium, Jalan Besar, Singapore	Philippines	4–1	4–1	Friendly
27	17 January 2007	National Stadium, Kallang, Singapore	Indonesia	2–1	2–2	2007 AFF Championship
28	24 June 2007	Jalan Besar Stadium, Jalan Besar, Singapore	North Korea	2–1	2–1	Friendly
29	5 December 2008	Gelora Bung Karno Stadium, Jakarta, Indonesia	Cambodia	3–0	5–0	2008 AFF Championship
30	31 December 2009	Bishan Stadium, Bishan, Singapore	Oman	1–4	1–4	Friendly
31	7 June 2013	New Laos National Stadium, Vientiane, Laos	Laos	0–1	2–5	Friendly

== Honours ==
Home United

- S.League: 2003
- Singapore Cup: 2001, 2003, 2005

Singapore

- AFF Championship: 2004, 2007

Individual

- S.League Young Player of the Year: 2000, 2001
- Southeast Asian Games top scorer: 2001
- S.League People's Choice Award: 2003
- AFC Cup top scorer: 2004

== Notes ==
- International caps milestones

- 113th – Hong Kong, 10 September 2013 "FIFA Century Club fact sheet" (PDF). FIFA. 11 December 2013. Archived from the original (PDF) on 1 February 2014.

== See also ==
- List of men's footballers with 100 or more international caps

Sporting positions
Preceded by Aide Iskandar	Singapore national team captain 2007-2010	Succeeded by Noh Alam Shah
