= Marko Kraljević =

Marko Kraljević may refer to:

- Prince Marko (c. 1335 – 1395), Serbian king from 1371 to 1395
- Marko Kraljević (footballer) (born 1965), German-Croat footballer
