= Razif Onn =

Singaporean footballer and manager

Personal information
- Full name: Mohammad Razif Bin Onn
- Date of birth: 3 November 1952 (age 74)
- Place of birth: Singapore

Managerial career
- Years: Team
- 1999–2015: Warriors FC (youth)
- 2015: Warriors FC (interim)
- 2016: Warriors FC (assistant)
- 2016–2017: Warriors FC

Razif Onn is a professional football coach from Singapore.

== Warriors FC ==
First taking the reins of Warriors FC in 2015 right before the end of the season, he was in charge of them for five games. Calculated in total, he lost three, won one, and drew one despite winning the first game, a 2–0 victory over Hougang United. In the end, they finished fifth and the youth coach asseverated that it was unequivocally 'unacceptable' for a club like Warriors FC. On their last fixture, Geylang International beat them 6–0 as well.

After Jörg Steinebrunner's unheralded departure in May 2016, Onn was appointed coach of Warriors FC; there was already speculation about Onn's return anyway. His first match would be a round 13 clash opposing Tampines Rovers; he managed to hold them to a scoreless draw. Unlike his predecessor, he managed to get 18 points from 13 matches, and recorded only one defeat in his first five games in charge which signified an improvement.

However, he lost all his cup matches in 2016 by exiting the Singapore Cup and losing three times in the League Cup.

In the 2017 season, he improved well in terms of the Warriors FC style of play bringing back the lights of Shahril Ishak and Baihakki Khaizan. He finished the season 5th as a first full season manager at Warriors FC. At the end of the season, Razif were reassigned as Warriors FC head of youth development, the head coach position later taken by Mirko Grabovac.
