= Richard Bok =

Singaporean football coach

Personal information
- Full name: Richard Bok Kok Chuan
- Date of birth: 3 August 1969 (age 57)
- Place of birth: Singapore

Team information
- Current team: ActiveSG Football Academy (head coach)

Senior career*
Years	Team	Apps	(Gls)
1988–1992	Sembawang SC		
1992–1995	Tyrwhitt Soccer		
1995–1997	Singapore Armed Forces		

Managerial career
- 1998–2006: Singapore Armed Forces (assistant)
- 2006–2012: Singapore Armed Forces
- 2014: Singapore U16
- 2015: Singapore U22
- 2022–: ActiveSG Football Academy
- * Club domestic league appearances and goals

Richard Bok Kok Chuan is a Singaporean professional football coach and former football player at SAFFC. He is currently the head coach of ActiveSG Football Academy at Serangoon Centre.

Richard is the most successful coach in the history of Singapore's S.League. He has led SAFFC to winning the S.League title four times, in 2006, 2007, 2008 and 2009, as well as the Singapore Cup in 2007, 2008 and 2012. Richard also won the S.League's Coach of the Year award in 2006, 2007 and 2009.

Richard has an AFC Professional Diploma Coaching License where he also holds an AFC Regional Instructor Course.

== Playing career ==
In 1995, Richard joined Singapore Armed Forces in the inaugural S.League season when the league was first started in 1996. In 1997, he suffered a stroke which left him with blurred vision and ended his playing career.

== Coaching career ==
=== SAFFC ===
After his stroke, Richard became an assistant coach at SAFFC for eight years. In May 2006, three months after the 2006 S.League season has started, SAFFC's head coach Peter Butler left after falling out with the club management and SAFFC's general manager Kok Wai Leong let Richard took over as caretaker coach.

In the AFC Club Competitions, Richard led SAFFC to 2 quarter-finals in the 2007 & 2008 AFC Cup. In 2009, he made history by leading SAFFC into the 2009 AFC Champions League group stages by defeating PEA of Thailand & PSMS Medan of Indonesia in the qualifying play-off. SAFFC made Singapore football history by being the first team in Singapore to qualify for the AFC Champions League. In the 2009 AFC Champions League group stage, SAFFC were grouped with J League champions Kashima Antlers of Japan, K-League champions Suwon Samsung Bluewings of South Korea and Chinese Super League runners-up Shanghai Shenhua of China. The club finished last in the group with 1 point from a draw against Shanghai Shenhua played at the Jalan Besar Stadium in Singapore.

In 2010, Richard led SAFFC to their 2nd successive AFC Champions League group stage by defeating Sriwijaya of Indonesia 3–0 at Jalan Besar stadium in Singapore and won the qualifying play-off final in Singapore against Muangthong United of Thailand on penalties. This time, they were grouped with Gamba Osaka of Japan, Henan Jianye of China and again Suwon Samsung Bluewings of Korea. This time round, Richard led his team to their first ever away point with a draw in Henan against Henan Jianye, thus equaling the one point they had in 2009. But they went one better with their first ever historical AFC Champions League win on 13 April 2010 at the Jalan Besar stadium with a 2–1 victory over Henan Jianye. Thus finishing third in the group ahead of big team of Chinese Super League Henan Jianye. This campaign put SAFFC and Singapore football on the map in Asia football.

At the end of the 2012 S.League season, Richard left the club after being at the club for 17 years after 217 games in charge as head coach.

=== Singapore U16 ===
On 31 May 2014, Richard was appointed as the Singapore U16 head coach.

=== Singapore U22 ===
In January 2015, Richard was appointed as the Singapore U22 head coach.

=== ActiveSG Football Academy ===
Bok is currently Head Coach Serangoon Centre with ActiveSG Football Academy.

== Personal life ==
Richard has stated that he supported Premier League side Liverpool and his favourite player was Ian Rush and Kenny Dalglish.

== Coaching statistics ==
Team	Country	From	To	Record				
Team	Country	From	To	G	W	D	L	WIN%
SAFFC	Singapore	9 May 2006	2012	280	165	50	65	58.93
Total				280	165	50	65	58.93

All Competition as of 1 November 2012

== Honours ==
=== As coach ===
- S.League: 2006, 2007, 2008, 2009
- Singapore Cup: 2007, 2008, 2012
- Singapore Community Shield: 2008, 2010
- S.League Coach Of The Year: 2006, 2007, 2009

==== Notable feat ====
- AFC Champions League East Playoff Winner : 2009, 2010
- AFC Champions League Groups stage : 2009, 2010
- AFC Cup quarter-finals: 2007, 2008
- AFF Asean Club Championship quarterfinals: 2003 (as Caretaker Coach)
