= 1998 S.League =

S. League
- Season: 1998
- Champions: Singapore Armed Forces; 2nd S.League title
- Asian Club Championship: Singapore Armed Forces
- Matches: 110
- Goals: 368 (3.35 per match)
- Top goalscorer: (England) Stuart Young (22)
- Biggest home win: Home United 9-3 Gombak United (18 July 1998)
- Biggest away win: Gombak United 1-6 Home United (20 May 1998)
- Highest scoring: Home United 9-3 Gombak United (18 July 1998)

The 1998 S.League was the third season of the S.League, the top professional football league in Singapore. Teams played each other once both home and away, in a 20-match season.

The 1998 S.League was won by Singapore Armed Forces, their second consecutive title.

== Teams ==
Jurong left Bukit Gombak Stadium upon completion of their new home ground Jurong East Stadium. Home United also relocated, leaving Jalan Besar Stadium to move into Bishan Stadium. Two new teams entered into the competition – Gombak United (who took the place of Jurong playing at Bukit Gombak Stadium) and Marine Castle United who made Hougang Stadium their home – taking the number of participating teams to eleven. Tiong Bahru United were renamed Tanjong Pagar United for the 1998 season.

Location of teams in 1998 S.League

Team	Stadium	Capacity	Location
Balestier Central	Toa Payoh Stadium	3,900	Toa Payoh
Gombak United	Bukit Gombak Stadium	3,000	Bukit Batok
Geylang United	Bedok Stadium	3,900	Bedok
Jurong	Jurong East Stadium	2,700	Jurong East
Home United	Bishan Stadium	4,000	Bishan
Marine Castle United	Hougang Stadium	3,000	Hougang
Singapore Armed Forces	Jurong Stadium	6,000	Jurong
Sembawang Rangers	Yishun Stadium	3,400	Yishun
Tampines Rovers	Tampines Stadium	3,600	Tampines
Tanjong Pagar United	Queenstown Stadium	3,800	Queenstown
Woodlands Wellington	Woodlands Stadium	4,300	Woodlands

== Foreign players ==
Each club is allowed to have up to a maximum of 5 foreign players.

Club	Player 1	Player 2	Player 3	Player 4	Player 5
Balestier Central	(Australia) Darren Stewart	(Brazil) Fabio Da Silva	(Croatia) Marko Kraljević	(Croatia) Goran Paulić	None
Geylang International	(South Korea) Jang Jung	(England) Kevin Hunt	(England) Max Nicholson	(Cameroon) Simamo Basile	(Cameroon) Lewono Joseph
Gombak United	(New Zealand) Chris Jackson	None	None	None	None
Home United	(Brazil) Sergio Cliveland	(Australia) Craig John Gaunt	(Brazil) Egmar Gonçalves	(Hungary) Zsolt Bucs	(England) Stuart Young
Jurong FC	(Croatia) Bojan Hodak	None	None	None	None
Marine Castle	(Australia) Scott O'Donell	(Ghana) Bernard Aryee	None	None	None
SAFFC	(Croatia) Davor Mioč	(Croatia) Ivica Raguž	(Croatia) Velimir Crljen	(Croatia) Jure Ereš	(Slovenia) Veselko Paponja
Sembawang Rangers	(Thailand) Tawan Sripan	(Brazil) Joselito Da Silva	None	(Bosnia and Herzegovina) Milomir Šešlija	None
Tampines Rovers	(Romania) Bogdan Brasoveanu	(Liberia) Nathaniel Klay Naplah	(Croatia) Zlatko Vidan	(Romania) Gheorghe Marian	None
Tanjong Pagar United	(Australia) Vlado Bozinovski	(Iran) Majid Motlagh	(Germany) Jörg Steinebrunner	(Croatia) Dragan Talajić	(Senegal) Nicodeme Boucher
Woodlands	None	None	None	None	None

== League table ==
Pos	Team	Pld	W	D	L	GF	GA	GD	Pts	Qualification
1	Singapore Armed Forces	20	14	4	2	46	17	+29	46	Qualification to Asian Club Championship first round
2	Tanjong Pagar United	20	14	4	2	39	15	+24	46	
3	Geylang United	20	11	5	4	32	18	+14	38	
4	Balestier Central	20	9	4	7	47	43	+4	31	
5	Jurong FC	20	9	4	7	32	33	−1	31	
6	Tampines Rovers	20	8	5	7	41	40	+1	29	
7	Home United	20	8	4	8	42	28	+14	28	
8	Sembawang Rangers	20	6	1	13	18	37	−19	19	
9	Woodlands Wellington	20	4	6	10	27	41	−14	18	
10	Gombak United	20	3	4	13	25	52	−27	13	
11	Marine Castle United	20	2	3	15	19	44	−25	9	

Source: RSSSF
Rules for classification: 1) points; 2) goal difference; 3) number of goals scored

Singapore Armed Forces qualified to compete in the 1999–2000 Asian Club Championship. This was their second appearance in continental competition. The club met with more success than in their first appearance, defeating Royal Dolphins of the Cambodian League 11–3 on aggregate in the East Asian first round. They were defeated in the second round by Sinthana of the Thai Premier League, going down 3–2 on aggregate.

== Top scorers ==
Rank	Name	Club	Goals
1	(England) Stuart Young	Home United	22
2	(Romania) Bogdan Brasoveanu	Tampines Rovers	20
3	(Croatia) Goran Paulić	Balestier Central	19
4	(Brazil) Egmar Goncalves	Home United	16
