= Vincent Subramaniam =

Singaporean football coach

Personal information
- Full name: Vincent Vaithilingam s/o Subramaniam
- Date of birth: 28 January 1955 (age 71)
- Place of birth: Singapore

Managerial career
- Years: Team
- 1996–1998: SAFFC
- 1999–2001: Singapore
- 2007: Home United
- 2010–2011: Churchill Brothers
- 2017: Young Lions
- 2019: Bhutan U17
- 2019–2023: Bhutan (technical director)

Vincent Vaithilingam s/o Subramaniam (born 28 January 1955) is a Singaporean football coach. Educated at Victoria School, Vincent was most recently in charge of Bhutan national team as their technical director.

Vincent was the national coach of the Singapore national team from 1999 to 2001. He has also managed Indian I-League club Churchill Brothers.

== Personal life ==
Vincent was a former staff sergeant with the Singapore Armed Forces.

== Honours ==
=== Manager ===
Singapore Armed Forces

- S.League: 1997, 1998

=== Individual ===
- S.League Coach of the Year: 1996, 1997
- Asian Coach of the Month: July 1997
