= Ivica Raguž =

Croatian footballer

Personal information
- Date of birth: 24 June 1968 (age 58)
- Place of birth: SR Croatia SFR Yugoslavia
- Height: 1.70 m (5 ft 7 in)
- Position: Midfielder

Senior career*
Years	Team	Apps	(Gls)
1991	Toronto Croatia		
1992–1994	Zadar	54	(0)
1994	Toronto Rockets	5	(0)
1996–1997	Singapore Armed Forces		
1999–2000	Slaven Belupo	9	(0)
2000–2001	Woodlands Wellington		
2001–2002	Zadar	1	(0)
2003	Toronto Croatia	8	(0)
- * Club domestic league appearances and goals

Ivica Raguž (born 24 June 1968) is a Croatian former professional footballer who played primarily as a midfielder, where he had a notable run in the S.League.

== Career ==
Raguž played in the National Soccer League in 1991 with Toronto Croatia, where he received the league's MVP award. In 1992, he played with NK Zadar of the Croatian First Football League in 1992. In 1994, he went abroad to play in the American Professional Soccer League with the Toronto Rockets. He made his debut for Toronto on 27 July 1994 against Montreal Impact.

Raguž later played in the newly formed S.League with the Singapore Armed Forces, where he formed an instrumental triumvirate with fellow Croatian imports Velimir Crljen and Jure Ere. In his debut season, he was named the 'Player of the Year' receiving the award. During his tenure with SAFFC, he won the league title, Singapore Cup, and the Singapore FA Cup.

In 1999, Raguž returned to Croatia to play with Slaven Belupo. The following season. he had another season in Singapore with Woodlands Wellington.

After a brief stint with Woodlands Wellington, he returned to his former club Zadar for the 2001–02 season. In 2003, he returned to Toronto Croatia to play in the Canadian Professional Soccer League.

== Honours ==
Singapore Armed Forces

- S.League: 1997
- Singapore FA Cup: 1997

Individual

- S.League Player of the Year: 1996
