= S. Subramani =

Singaporean footballer

Personal information
- Full name: Shunmugham Subramani
- Date of birth: 5 August 1972 (age 54)
- Place of birth: Singapore
- Height: 1.77 m (5 ft 9 1/2 in)
- Positions: Centre-back; right-back

Senior career*
Years	Team	Apps	(Gls)
1992–1998	Tanjong Pagar United	80	(0)
1999–2009	Home United	226	(2)
Total		306	(2)

International career
1996–2007	Singapore	115	(0)

Managerial career
- 2010: Home United (assistant)
- 2011–2015: Young Lions (assistant)
- 2013–2015: Singapore U23 (assistant)
- 2017–2019: Young Lions (assistant)
- 2018: Singapore (assistant)
- 2019: Singapore U22 (assistant)
- * Club domestic league appearances and goals

Shunmugham Subramani (born 5 August 1972), commonly known as S. Subramani, is a former Singapore footballer in the S.League and former defender for the Singapore national football team.

== Playing career ==
Subramani started his career with Tiong Bahru Constituency Sports Club in 1992. The club would change its name to Tiong Bahru United Football Club and then Tanjong Pagar United. In 1998, Subramani won the Singapore Cup and Singapore FA Cup in 1998, as well as being named S.League player of the year.

He signed for Home United in the 1999 season, where he teamed up with his regular partner at international level, Aide Iskandar.

Subramani retired from football at the age of 37 in 2009.

== Coaching career ==
Subramani was assistant coach of Singapore's Under-23 team with Kadir Yahaya.

== International career ==
Subramani made his debut for Singapore on 27 June 1996 in the 4–0 win over Myanmar in an Asian Cup Qualifier.

He played in every game in both the historic 1998 and 2004 triumphant Tiger Cup campaigns. He also played in two SEA Games, reaching the semi-finals in both Jakarta 1997 and Brunei 1999.

Subramani wanted to retire from international football in September 2004 before he was persuaded by coach Radojko Avramović to stay on. He officially retired following Singapore's triumph in the 2007 ASEAN Football Championship.

Subramani was inducted into the FIFA Century Club in June 2007.

== Honours ==
=== Club ===
Tanjong Pagar

- Singapore Cup: 1998
- Singapore FA Cup: 1998

Home United

- S.League: 1999, 2003
- Singapore Cup: 2000, 2001, 2003, 2005

=== International ===
Singapore

- ASEAN Football Championship: 1998, 2004, 2007

=== Individual ===
- S.League Player of the Year: 1998

== See also ==
- List of men's footballers with 100 or more international caps
