= Warriors FC =

Singarorean football club, 1996–2019

Warriors
- Full name: Warriors Football Club
- Nickname: The Rhinos
- Founded: 1975; 51 years ago (as Singapore Armed Forces Sports Association (SAFSA) 1996; 30 years ago (as Singapore Armed Forces FC (SAFFC) 2013; 13 years ago (as Warriors FC)
- Dissolved: 2021
- Ground: Choa Chu Kang Stadium
- Capacity: 4,268
- Chairman: Lam Shiu Tong
- League: Singapore Premier League
- 2019: Singapore Premier League, 7th of 9
- Website: www.warriorsfc.org.sg
Home colours	Away colours

Warriors Football Club was a professional football club based in Choa Chu Kang, Singapore, that played in the Singapore Premier League, the top division of football in Singapore. Before changing their name on 20 January 2013, they were known as Singapore Armed Forces Football Club (SAFFC). Despite their name back then, not all players from the team came from the Armed Forces.

The club's original choice of mascot was a wolf, later changed to a rhinoceros, which represents discipline, spirit, courage and teamwork. Warriors have been the most successful club in the history Singapore, having won the league title a record 9 times in 1997, 1998, 2000, 2002, 2006, 2007, 2008, 2009 and 2014.

== History ==
=== 1975–1995 ===
The Singapore Armed Forces Sports Association (SAFSA) football team was formed in 1975 to provide talented footballers serving National Service with opportunities to play competitive football. They were placed in Division One in the first season of the Singapore Football League in 1975, despite not being based on a constituency or district.

They won the President's Cup in 1975, a feat that they repeated in 1978, when they also captured the National Football League title to complete double. Their Under-19 team won the national Under-19 title in 1979, 1980 and 1983, while the 1981 season of the National Football League saw the SAFSA emerge as unbeaten champions. The President's Cup was won by them again in 1984 and 1986, the latter time as part of a second double, as they also won the National Football League on goal difference. In 1990, the Pools Cup went to the SAFSA and their convincing displays led to their selection as one of eight clubs to compete in the newly formed S.League.

=== 1996–2005 ===
The club than revamp it named to Singapore Armed Forces Football Club (SAFFC) and also adopt a new mascot as in its club logo where they joined the inaugural S.League in 1996. The reserve team which still keep its old name and old logo also resulted in the withdrawal of SAFSA from the National Football League. SAFSA would not participate in Singaporean football leagues again until 1999, when they rejoined the league. SAFFC than finished second in 1996 in its debut season where they signed 5 Croatian players Ivica Raguž, Jure Ereš, Velimir Crljen, Davor Mioč and Goran Grubesic. With Grubesic leaving the club at the end of the 1996 season, SAFFC continued with 4 of the remaining foreigners where the club went on to win back-to-back S.League title in 1997 and 1998.

After retiring from football, club captain Fandi Ahmad took over from Mladen Pralija as the club head coach in 1999 where he guided them to win the S.League title in 2000 and 2002.

Three coaches were at the reins during this period, each lasting only one season. SAFFC finished second in 2005 but otherwise outside the top two.

=== 2006–2012 ===
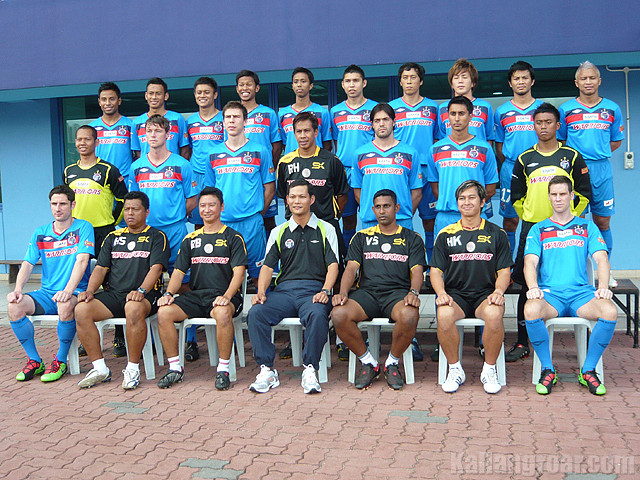
SAFFC's squad in 2010

Singaporean Richard Bok took over as SAFFC's head coach in 2006 and led them to four consecutive league championships from 2006 to 2009.

In 2008, SAFFC became the first Singaporean club to achieve a back-to-back domestic double, after winning both the S.League and the Singapore Cup in 2007 and 2008.

==== AFC Champions League debut ====
In 2009, SAFFC qualified for the AFC Champions League by defeating Thailand champions PEA and PSMS Medan of Indonesia in the Eastern zone play-offs, becoming Singapore's first-ever representative at the highest club competition in Asia.

SAFFC were drawn in a group with J.League champions Kashima Antlers, K League champions Suwon Samsung Bluewings and Chinese Super League runners-up Shanghai Shenhua. They lost all of their matches, except for a 1–1 draw against Shanghai Shenhua at home.

In 2010, SAFFC qualified for their second consecutive AFC Champions League by registering a 3–0 home win against Sriwijaya of Indonesia and defeated Muangthong United of Thailand in the Eastern zone play-off final, again at home. Against Henan Jianye of China in the group stage, they drew in the two teams' first encounter and won the return leg 2–1 in Singapore, finishing third in a group that also contained familiar rivals Suwon Samsung Bluewings and former champions Gamba Osaka.

=== 2013–2019 ===
On 20 January 2013, SAFFC announced that they had changed their name to Warriors Football Club ahead of the 2013 S.League season.

Englishmen Alex Weaver, in his first full season as coach of Warriors FC, clinched the 2014 S.League title on the last day of the competition for the Warriors. With DPMM of Brunei leading the table until the last day, the Warriors scored a 1–0 win over Albirex Niigata Singapore and received a favour from Tampines Rovers, who beat DPMM 2–1 to hand Warriors their first title in 5 years and their 9th title in the league's 19-year history.

However, good times did not last for the Warriors. In November 2019, the team were brought to court and charged with 107 counts of not paying salaries for their staff. In total, they failed to pay more than S$350,000 in salaries to about 30 employees, including players, coaches and supporting staff.

2 days after the incident was reported, ST reported that there were 2 parties that were interested to take over Warriors FC.

On 31 December 2019, the FAS had instructed the Warriors to sit out the 2020 Singapore Premier League season due to their financial and legal issues. They applied to return to the Singapore Premier League and Singapore Cup competitions for 2021 to no avail.

== Stadium ==
The Warriors were initially based at the Jurong Stadium until 2000, before permanetely moving to the 4,268 capacity Choa Chu Kang Stadium in 2001.

The stadium has become familiar for its elegant and soaring curved white steel roof, with supporting pylons, that covers the main grandstand. The football pitch itself consists of a self-watering "cell-system" turf pitch installation, supplied from Switzerland and approved by FIFA for international competition. The club has won 6 League titles during their time here.

Before the 2015 SEA Games commenced, they had to vacate Choa Chu Kang Stadium and instead played their home matches at the Woodlands Stadium for the 2015 season instead.

== Seasons ==
Season	Name Changed	League	Pos.	P	W	D	L	GS	GA	Pts	Singapore Cup	League Cup
1996-1	Singapore Armed Forces	S.League	4th	14	5	3	6	27	25	18		
1996-2	Singapore Armed Forces	S.League	1st	14	9	5	0	32	14	32		
1997	Singapore Armed Forces	S.League	1st	16	12	1	3	42	11	37		
1998	Singapore Armed Forces	S.League	1st	20	14	4	2	46	17	46	Runners-up	
1999	Singapore Armed Forces	S.League	2nd	22	14	7	1	63	24	49	Winners	
2000	Singapore Armed Forces	S.League	1st	22	16	4	2	53	15	52	Runners-up	
2001	Singapore Armed Forces	S.League	2nd	33	24	2	7	101	46	74	Third place	
2002	Singapore Armed Forces	S.League	1st	33	26	6	1	104	37	84	Quarter-finals	
2003	Singapore Armed Forces	S.League	3rd	33	20	2–5	6	68	37	69	Group stage	
2004	Singapore Armed Forces	S.League	4th	27	14	3	10	45	48	45	Quarter-finals	
2005	Singapore Armed Forces	S.League	2nd	27	15	7	5	54	41	52	Semi-finals	
2006	Singapore Armed Forces	S.League	1st	30	20	8	2	71	36	68	Quarter-finals	
2007	Singapore Armed Forces	S.League	1st	33	25	4	4	95	38	79	Winners	Withdrew
2008	Singapore Armed Forces	S.League	1st	33	24	5	4	85	34	77	Winners	Quarter-finals
2009	Singapore Armed Forces	S.League	1st	30	22	1	7	73	31	67	Round of 16	Runners-up
2010	Singapore Armed Forces	S.League	4th	33	16	5	12	56	41	53	Round of 16	Quarter-finals
2011	Singapore Armed Forces	S.League	3rd	33	21	3	9	74	39	66	Quarter-finals	Quarter-finals
2012	Singapore Armed Forces	S.League	7th	24	9	5	10	43	41	32	Winners	Semi-finals
2013	Warriors	S.League	7th	27	9	8	10	38	38	35	Preliminary	Group stage
2014	Warriors	S.League	1st	27	16	5	6	53	35	53	Preliminary	Group stage
2015	Warriors	S.League	5th	27	11	4	12	40	51	37	Quarter-finals	Group stage
2016	Warriors	S.League	7th	24	7	7	10	39	39	28	Preliminary	Group stage
2017	Warriors	S.League	5th	24	9	7	8	33	36	34	Preliminary	Runners-up
2018	Warriors	Singapore Premier League	5th	24	7	7	10	32	35	28	Quarter-finals	
2019	Warriors	Singapore Premier League	7th	24	6	5	13	40	56	22	Runners-up	

- The 1996 season of the S.League was split into two series. Tiger Beer Series winners Geylang United defeated Pioneer Series winners Singapore Armed Forces in the championship play-off to clinch the S.League title.
- 2003 saw the introduction of penalty shoot-outs if a match ended in a draw in regular time. Winners of penalty shoot-outs won two points instead of one.

== Performance in AFC competitions ==
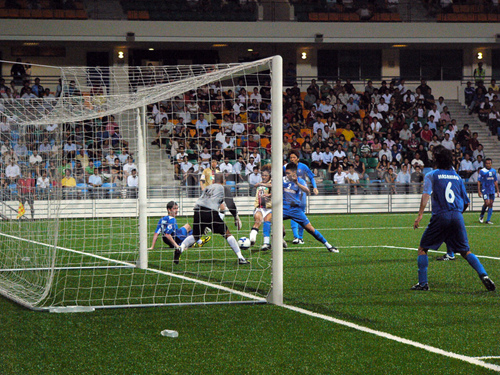
Facing Kashima Antlers during the AFC Champions League fixtures on 7 April 2009

- AFC Champions League: 3 appearances

2009: Group stage
2010: Group stage
2015: Second qualifying round

- Asian Club Championship: 3 appearances

1999: First round
2000: Second round
2002: First round

- AFC Cup: 4 appearances

2007: Quarter-finals
2008: Quarter-finals
2013: Group stage
2015: Group stage

- AFC Cup Winners Cup: 2 appearances

1998: Second round
2001: First round

== Personal awards ==
=== Domestic ===
- League Player of the Year
  - (Croatia) Ivica Raguž (1996)
  - (Singapore) Mirko Grabovac (2000)
  - (Thailand) Therdsak Chaiman (2002)
  - (Singapore) Aleksandar Đurić (2007, 2008)
  - (Bosnia and Herzegovina) Mislav Karoglan (2011)
  - (Singapore) Hassan Sunny (2014)
- League Young Player of the Year
  - (Argentina) Nicolás Vélez (2014)
- League Coach of the Year
  - (Singapore) Jita Singh (1998)
  - (Singapore) Fandi Ahmad (2000)
  - (Singapore) Richard Bok (2006, 2007, 2009)
- League Top Scorer
  - (Singapore) (Croatia) Jure Ereš (1996)
  - (Singapore) Mirko Grabovac (1999, 2000, 2001, 2002)
  - (Singapore) Aleksandar Đurić (2007, 2008, 2009)
  - (Bosnia and Herzegovina) Mislav Karoglan (2011)
- League Golden Gloves
  - (Singapore) Hassan Sunny (2009)

== Awards ==
=== Player of the Year Award ===
Season	Name
1996	
2000	
2002	
2007	
2008	Aleksandar Đurić
2011	
2014	Hassan Sunny

=== Top scorers ===
Season	Name	Goals
1996		28
1999	(Croatia) Mirko Grabovac	23
2000	(Croatia) Mirko Grabovac	19
2001	(Croatia) Mirko Grabovac	39
2002	Mirko Grabovac	34
2007	Aleksandar Đurić	37
2008	Aleksandar Đurić	28
2009	Aleksandar Đurić	28
2011	(Bosnia and Herzegovina) Mislav Karoglan	33

* Mirko Grabovac was naturalised from 2002 until he renounced his Singaporean citizenship in 2008.

* Aleksandar Đurić was naturalised since 2007.

== Honours ==
=== League ===
- Singapore Premier League (record)
  - Champions (9): 1997, 1998, 2000, 2002, 2006, 2007, 2008, 2009 and 2014
  - Runners-up (4): 1996, 1999, 2001, 2005

=== Cup ===
- Singapore Cup
  - Champions (4): 1999, 2007, 2008, 2012
  - Runners-up (3): 1998, 2000, 2019
- Singapore Community Shield
  - Champions (3): 2008, 2010, 2015
  - Runners-up (1): 2013
- President's Cup
  - Champions (3): 1975, 1984, 1986

=== Reserve ===
- Singapore FA Cup (record)
  - Champions (4): 1997, 2006, 2008, 2017
- Singapore League Cup
  - Runners-up (2): 2009, 2017

== Records and statistics ==
=== Top 10 all-time appearances ===
Rank	Player	Years	Club appearances
1	(Singapore) Rezal Hassan	1996–2004, 2010–2013	312
2	(Singapore) Daniel Bennett	2002, 2003–2004 2007–2016	234
3	(Singapore) Shahril Jantan	2002–2003 2006–2012	167
4	(Singapore) Zulfadli Zainal Abidin	2009, 2011–2014 2016–2017	156
5	(Singapore) Hafiz Osman	2003–2011 2016–2017	153
6	(Thailand) Therdsak Chaiman	2002, 2005–2009	145
7	(Singapore) Shaiful Esah	2005–2011 2016–2017	131
8	(Singapore) Mustaqim Manzur	2005–2011	127
9	(Croatia) Marin Vidošević	2012–2015	112
10	(Singapore) Emmeric Ong	2015–2019	111

=== Top 10 all-time scorers ===
Rank	Name	Club Appearances	Total goals
1	(Thailand) Therdsak Chaiman	145	74
2	(Bosnia and Herzegovina) Mislav Karoglan	98	66
3	(Singapore) Aleksandar Đurić	74	57
4	(France) Jonathan Béhé	75	50
5	(Singapore) Fazrul Nawaz	94	43
6	(Argentina) Nicolás Vélez	51	30
7	(Singapore) John Wilkinson	99	25
8	(Bosnia and Herzegovina) Miroslav Pejić	52	19
9	(South Korea) Park Tae-won	61	17
9	(Singapore) Indra Sahdan Daud	58	17

- Biggest Wins: 9–0 vs Sembawang Rangers (On 15 June 2002)
- Heaviest Defeats: 8–1 vs Home United (On 18 August 2004)
- Youngest Goal scorers: Marijan Šuto ~ 19 years 7 months 3 days old (On 5 May 2016 vs DPMM)
- Oldest Goal scorers: Aleksandar Đurić ~ 39 years 2 months 4 days old (On 16 October 2009 vs Sengkang Punggol)
- Youngest ever debutant: Danial Zulkifli ~ 17 years 2 months 6 days old (On 25 July 2016 vs Geylang International)

== Former managers ==
Manager	Career	Achievements
(Singapore) Hussein Aljunied	7 March 1983 – 31 December 1988	– 1984, 1986 President's Cup
(Croatia) Ivan Raznevich	1 January 1996 – 11 June 1996	
(Singapore) Vincent Subramaniam	11 June 1996 – 31 December 1998	– 1997, 1998 S.League
(Croatia) Mladen Pralija	1 January 1999 – 30 November 1999	– 1999 Singapore Cup
(Singapore) Fandi Ahmad	1 January 2000 – 30 November 2003	– 2000, 2002 S.League
(England) Jim Shoulder	1 December 2003 – 30 November 2004	
(Denmark) Kim Poulsen	1 January 2005 – 31 October 2005	
(England) Peter Butler	1 January 2006 – 9 May 2006	
(Singapore) Richard Bok	9 May 2006 – 31 December 2012	– 2006, 2007, 2008, 2009 S.League – 2007, 2008, 2012 Singapore Cup – 2008, 2010 Singapore Community Shield
=== As Warriors ===
(Singapore) Vengadasalam Selvaraj	1 January 2013 – 12 June 2013	
(England) Alex Weaver	12 June 2013 – 24 October 2015	– 2014 S.League – 2015 Singapore Charity Shield
(Singapore) Razif Onn	26 October 31 – 1 December 2015	
(Morocco) Karim Bencherifa	1 December 2015 – 6 January 2016	
(Germany) Jörg Steinebrunner	6 January 2016 – 14 May 2016	
(Singapore) Razif Onn (2)	14 May 2016 – 1 January 2018	
(Croatia) Mirko Grabovac	15 January 2018 – 1 November 2018	
(Singapore) Azlan Alipah	1 January 2019 – 31 December 2019	
