= Jita Singh =

Jita Singh (born 10 April 1949) is a Singaporean former football coach.

== Career ==
Singh managed the Singapore national football team.

He coached Tampines Rovers in the 2001 and 2002 S.league.
