= Marko Kraljević (footballer) =

Croatian football coach

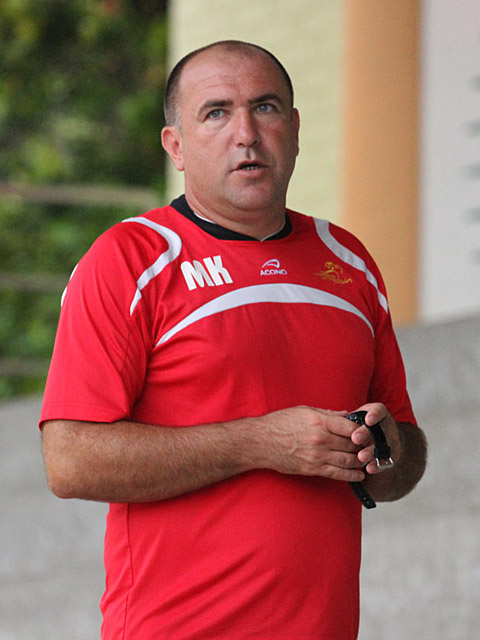
- Kraljević with Woodlands Wellington in 2012

Personal information
- Date of birth: 1 November 1965 (age 61)
- Place of birth: Düsseldorf, West Germany
- Position: Attacking midfielder

Team information
- Current team: Balestier Khalsa (Head coach)

Senior career*
Years	Team	Apps	(Gls)
1990	Osijek		
1991–1994	Kelantan		
1995	HK Rangers		
1996–1998	Balestier Central		
1999–2000	Tampines Rovers		
2001	Jurong Town		

Managerial career
- 2008–2011: Balestier Khalsa U22
- 2012–2013: Woodlands Wellington U22
- 2014–2019: Balestier Khalsa
- 2019: Kelantan
- 2019–2021: Balestier Khalsa
- 2022–2023: Hougang United U21
- 2023–2024: Hougang United
- 2025–: Balestier Khalsa
- * Club domestic league appearances and goals

Marko Kraljević (born 1 November 1965) is a Croatian football coach and former player who is the head coach for Singapore Premier League club Balestier Khalsa.

== Playing career ==
An attacking-midfielder, Kraljević played in the Malaysian Premier League for Kelantan. and Hong Kong Rangers in 1995. He won the Hong Kong Senior Shield and Hong Kong FA Cup in the successful season of 1994–95. Next, he travelled to Singapore to play in the S.League during its early years for Balestier Central, and later with Tampines Rovers and Jurong FC as a striker.

== Coaching career ==
=== Balestier Khalsa ===
After he retired, Kraljević started off his coaching career with the Balestier Khalsa Centre of Excellence (COE) under-16 team, working his way up to become the head coach of the Prime League team for the Tigers.

=== Woodlands Wellington ===
He then moved to become the Prime League coach of Woodlands Wellington in 2012.

=== Balestier Khalsa ===
Kraljević returned to Balestier as head coach for their 2014 S.League season. He quickly transformed the team into one of the toughest in the League, winning the club's first ever Singapore Cup and awarded the S.League Coach of the Year at the end of that season.

Kraljević led Balestier Khalsa in the AFC Cup in 2015, along the way, they won 2013 AFC Cup semi finalist, East Bengal 2–1. With limited resource in 2016, Kraljević still able produce some positive results, beating Dhivehi Premier League champions, New Radiant 3–0 and held them 2–2 away from home before winning Hong Kong Premier League winners 1–0 at Jalan Besar Stadium as the underdog. Balestier ended the season with a fourth place in the Singapore Cup.

=== Kelantan ===
After five years with Balestier Khalsa, where he becomes the longest serving head coach of the club, Kraljević was appointed as new head coach of Kelantan FA in January 2019, returning to the team he has played for in the 1990s. However, his contract was terminated on April the same year, with Kelantan occupying the relegation spot in 2019 Malaysia Premier League.

=== Return to Balestier Khalsa ===
On 24 September 2019, Kraljević returned to Balestier Khalsa as head coach.

=== Hougang United ===
On 16 February 2022, Kraljević joined Hougang United as their head of youth, leading the coaching responsibility for the club's under-21 side. On 17 April 2023, Kraljević replaced Firdaus Kassim as interim head coach for the team after the team failed to win any matches since they won the opening match in the 2023 Singapore Premier League season. Firdaus took over Kraljević's position as head of youth. On 20 December 2024, Kraljević was sacked by Hougang United.

=== Third stint at Balestier Khalsa ===
On 28 June 2025, Kraljević returned to Balestier Khalsa for his third spell at the club.

== Personal life ==
Marko is the joint-owner of the Stadio futsal facilities found around Singapore together with V. Sundramoorthy.

He is married to a Singaporean wife and has two children.

== Honours ==
=== Player ===
Hong Kong Rangers

- Hong Kong Senior Shield: 1994–95
- Hong Kong FA Cup: 1994–95

=== Manager ===
Balestier Khalsa

- Singapore Cup: 2014
- League Cup: 2015 (Runner-up)
- League Cup Plate Tournament: 2014 (Runner-up)
- Community Shield: 2015 (Runner-up)

=== Individual ===
- S.League Coach of the Year: 2014
