= Singapore Premier League =

Professional association football league

- Organising body: Football Association of Singapore (FAS)
- Founded: 14 April 1996; 30 years ago (as S.League); 31 March 2018; 8 years ago (as Singapore Premier League)
- Country: Singapore
- Confederation: AFC
- Number of clubs: 8
- Level on pyramid: 1
- Domestic cup(s): Singapore Cup; Singapore Community Shield
- International cup(s): AFC Champions League Two; ASEAN Club Championship
- Current champions: Lion City Sailors (5th title)
- Most championships: Warriors FC (9 titles)
- Most appearances: Daniel Bennett (518)
- Top scorer: Aleksandar Đurić (385)
- Broadcasters: 1 Play Sports (live streaming); Mediacorp; Singtel TV; Starhub; J Sports
- Website: spl.sg
- Current: 2026–27 Singapore Premier League

The Singapore Premier League, commonly abbreviated as the SPL, officially known as the AIA Singapore Premier League for sponsorship reasons, is a men's professional football league sanctioned by the Football Association of Singapore (FAS), which represents the sport's highest level in the Singapore football league system.

The competition was founded as the S.League on 14 April 1996, after the FAS announced its intention to promote and expand the growing local football community by having a top-level domestic league. The league adopted its current name in 2018. As of 2025, the league comprises eight clubs, consisting of four rounds in which each team plays every other team once. Seasons run from late August to May, with teams playing 28 matches each, totalling 112 matches in the season.

Successful SPL clubs qualify for Asian continental club competitions, including the AFC Champions League Two. The SPL currently does not practice promotion and relegation. Since the league's inception in 1996, 7 clubs have been crowned champions. Warriors (Note: Formerly known as the Singapore Armed Forces Football Club (SAFFC).) have been the most successful club with 9 titles, followed by FC Jurong (6), (Note: Formerly known as Albirex Niigata (S).) Tampines Rovers and Lion City Sailors with 5, (Note: The latter was formerly known as Home United Football Club (HUFC).) Geylang International (2), DPMM (2) and Étoile (1). The current champions are Lion City Sailors, having won their fifth league title in the 2025–26 season.

== History ==
=== Origins ===
Singapore had been represented in the Malaysia Cup through the Singapore Lions since 1921. The Lions were one of the most successful teams in the competition, having won it 24 times from 1921 to 1994. Following a dispute over gate receipts between the FAS and FAM after winning the league and cup double in 1994, the Lions withdrew from the Malaysian competitions.

Subsequently, FAS decided to build a professional league system. However, as it was estimated to take about a year to put in place the structure of a professional league, the Singapore Lions were given match practice in what was then the top level of domestic football, the semi-professional FAS Premier League. This team won the last FAS Premier League title, finishing the season unbeaten.

=== S.League era (1996–2017) ===
==== Inaugural season ====
The S.League was founded in 1996. The FAS invited applications for clubs to compete in the newly formed league. Eight successful applications were made. Two clubs from the Premier League – powerhouse Geylang International (renamed Geylang United; 6 consecutive Premier League titles) and Balestier United (renamed Balestier Central) – joined six from the amateur National Football League – Police SA, Singapore Armed Forces (SAFFC), Tampines Rovers, Tiong Bahru United, Wellington (renamed Woodlands Wellington) and Sembawang Rangers (merger of Gibraltar Crescent and Sembawang SC) – for the inaugural edition of the S.League. The season was split into two series. Tiger Beer Series winners Geylang United defeated Pioneer Series winners SAFFC 2–1 in the end-of-season championship playoff to be crowned the 1st S.League champions. The 30,000 crowd at the playoff remains the record attendance in the S.League.

Each club joining the S. League, whether in the inaugural year or subsequent years, was required to choose an animal as its mascot.Each club was required to choose an animal as its mascot. Tampines Rovers chose the stag. The mascot for each club became its nickname.

==== Expansion of the league ====
NFL side Jurong Town, who renamed themselves Jurong FC, joined the competition taking the number of participating clubs to 9. The league switched from its previous format to a round-robin competition. Singapore Armed Forces won their first title. Gombak United and Marine Castle United joined the S.League in 1998, further taking the number of clubs to 11. Tiong Bahru United renamed themselves to Tanjong Pagar United at the start of the season. Singapore Armed Forces won their second consecutive title. Clementi Khalsa joined the S.League in 1999 as a representative of the Sikh community in Singapore. The league took on 12 clubs for the next five years.

==== Invited clubs ====
During the 2000s, the FAS decided to invite foreign clubs to the league to increase league competitiveness. Sinchi, a side composed of Chinese players became the first foreign club to participate in 2003. Chinese nationals Shi Jiayi and Qiu Li went on to become naturalised Singapore players.

Sporting Afrique, a club made up of African players, and Super Reds, a side comprising South Korean players, became the third and fourth foreign clubs to join the competition in 2006 and 2007 respectively. Sporting Afrique was refused entry into the 2007 S.League due to off-field controversies and poor performance. In 2010, Super Reds were denied a place after three seasons following attempts to convert into a team of local players.

Chinese Super League clubs Liaoning (2007), Dalian Shide (2008) and Beijing Guoan (2010) entered their feeder clubs in the S.League. All three clubs each lasted one season before being pulled out of the league due to poor performances and disciplinary issues. Bruneian club DPMM joined the S.League in 2009 before being pulled from the league as a result of a FIFA ban. They re-entered the league in 2012. They were the first club to base themselves outside of Singapore. In 2010, French club Étoile became the first foreign side to win the S.League. Etoile pulled out of the S.League before the 2012 season to focus on grassroots football and youth development.

In 2012, Malaysia national youth sides Harimau Muda A and Harimau Muda B joined the S.League following an agreement between the Football Association of Singapore and the Football Association of Malaysia (FAM) to send their representative sides into their respective domestic competitions. Singaporean side LionsXII returned to the Malaysian competitions in 2012. Echoing the former Singapore FA, the LionsXII quickly became a successful force in the Malaysian league system during its short stint, winning the league title in 2013 as well as the FA Cup in 2015.

However, on 25 November 2015, the FAM decided not to extend their Memorandum of Understanding (MoU) with the FAS. This automatically disqualified LionsXII from further entering any football tournament in Malaysia. Similarly, Malaysia's squad Harimau Muda did not participate in the Singapore League from then onwards.

J.League club Albirex Niigata entered their feeder club Albirex Niigata Singapore in the 2004 S.League. The club became the most established foreign side in the S.League, drawing on the support of the Japanese expatriate community and some local fans. As of 2023, they are the foreign side with the longest involvement in Singaporean football.

==== 20th season ====
The league took on several changes for the 2015 season to increase its competitiveness. The number of clubs was reduced from 12 to 10, with the withdrawal of Tanjong Pagar United due to financial problems, and the merger of Woodlands Wellington and Hougang United. The league returned to a three-round format used from 2001 to 2011. The foreign player quota remained at five per club, but incentives were given to those who signed an under-21 player. The passing time for the mandatory 2.4 km fitness test was lowered from 10 mins to 9 mins 45 s. A new rule on age restrictions – a maximum of five players aged 30 and above and a minimum of three under-25 players for clubs with a 22-man squad, a maximum of four players aged 30 and above and a minimum of two under-25 players for clubs with a 20-man squad – was later reversed.

=== Rebranding as Singapore Premier League (2018–present) ===
The league was rebranded as the Singapore Premier League on 21 March 2018. Further revamps were also made to see a greater emphasis on local youth players in a bid to strengthen the national side; this, in effect, has resulted in several senior as well as local and foreign stars being purchased by overseas clubs. In the 2022 season, 8 clubs played a four-round format for the first time. In response to changes in Asian Football Confederation club competitions and potential FIFA calendar amendments, FAS announced that the league calendar will undergo a two-year transition process. The 2024–25 season was played from 10 May 2024 to 25 May 2025, the first time that a season was scheduled over a two-year period. The 2025–26 season would then align with AFC club competitions, starting in August 2025 and concluding in May 2026, setting the timeline for subsequent seasons.

== Competition format ==
There is no relegation or promotion system in the league. Clubs enter the Singapore Premier League by invitation of the Football Association of Singapore.

Season	No. of clubs	Matches per club	Notes
1996	8	14 × 2 series	One title playoff match between series winners at the end of the season.
1997	9	16	
1998	11	20	
1999–2000	12	22	
2001–2003	12	33	In 2003, matches proceeded to a penalty shootout in the event of a draw. Shootout winners were awarded an extra point on top of the draw.
2004–2005	10	27	
2006	11	30	
2007–2011	12	33	DPMM's results were expunged towards the end of 2009 following a ban, leaving 11 teams playing 30 matches each.
2012	13	24	
2013–2014	12	27	The league was split into two-halves after matchday 22. Teams in each half play every other team from their half once, for an additional five matches. Results in the 2nd phase were added to that in the 1st phase for overall standings.
2015	10	27	The league returned to a three-round format.
2016–2017	9	24	
2018–2019	9	24	
2020	8	14	
2021	8	21	
2022	8	28	The league played a four-round format for the first time.
2023	9	24	The league returned to a three-round format.
2024–25	9	32	The league returned to a four-round format.
2025–26	8	21	The league returned to a three-round format.
2026-27	8	21	

== Clubs ==
=== Current clubs ===
A total of 24 clubs have played in the league from its inception in 1996 up to and including the 2026–27 season. The following 8 clubs are competing in the league during the 2026–27 season.

Club	Founded	Based	Stadium	Capacity	Former names
Balestier Khalsa	1898	Toa Payoh	Bishan Stadium	6,254	formed as Fathul Kharib FC, changed name to Balestier United RC in 1975, and to Balestier Central in 1996, and merged with Clementi Khalsa in 2002.
Geylang International	1973	Bedok	Our Tampines Hub	3,800	known as Geylang United from 1996 to 2012.
Hougang United	1998	Hougang	Hougang Stadium	6,000	known as Marine Castle United (1998–2001), Sengkang Marine (2002–2003), Sengkang Punggol (2006–2010; merger with Paya Lebar Punggol).
FC Jurong	2004	Jurong East	Jurong East Stadium	2,700	formed as Albirex Niigata Singapore in 2004, changed name to Alberix Jurong FC in 2025, and to FC Jurong in 2026.
Lion City Sailors	1946	MacPherson	Bishan Stadium	6,254	formed as Police Sports Association, known as Police FC in 1996, changed name to Home United in 1997, privatised and changed name to Lion City Sailors in 2020.
Tampines Rovers	1945	Tampines	Our Tampines Hub	5,000	sponsorship name: BG Tampines Rovers (2023-2025)
Tanjong Pagar United	1974	Queenstown	Jurong East Stadium	3,800	known as Tiong Bahru Constituency Sports Club (1974–1996), Tiong Bahru United (1996–1998).
Young Lions	2002	Kallang	Jalan Besar Stadium	6,000	Sponsorship names: Courts Young Lions (2011–2015), Garena Young Lions (2016–2017).

Balestier Khalsa, Geylang International and Tampines Rovers are the only clubs that have played in all 28 seasons of the Singapore Premier League as of 2024.

=== Former clubs ===
Team	Founded	Based	Stadium	Years active	Former names
Gombak United	1960	Bukit Gombak	Bukit Gombak Stadium	1998–2002; 2006–2012	
Woodlands Wellington	1988	Woodlands	Woodlands Stadium	1996–2014	formed as Wellington FC, changed name to Woodlands Wellington upon joining the S. League in 1996
Sembawang Rangers	1996	Sembawang	Yishun Stadium	1996–2003	formed from merger between Gibraltar Crescent and Sembawang Sports Club
Jurong FC	1975	Jurong	Jurong Stadium	1997–2003	formed as Jurong Town FC, changed name to Jurong FC in 1997
Warriors	1979	Choa Chu Kang	Choa Chu Kang Stadium	1996–2019	formed as Singapore Armed Forces Football Club, changed name to Warriors in 2013
Home United	1997	Bishan	Bishan Stadium	1997-2019	formed as Police Sports Association, changed name to Home United in 1997

Years indicates seasons active in the league.

==== Invited clubs ====
Team	Years	Based	Stadium	Notes
Sinchi	2003–2005	Taman Jurong	Jurong Stadium	Domestic-based team of Chinese expatriates
Albirex Niigata (S)	2004–2024	Jurong East	Jurong East Stadium	Satellite club of Albirex Niigata of Japan until 2024, before being localised
Sporting Afrique	2006	Yishun	Yishun Stadium	Domestic-based team of African expatriates
Liaoning Guangyuan	2007	Queenstown	Queenstown Stadium	Satellite club of Liaoning of China
Yishun Super Reds	2007–2009	Yishun	Yishun Stadium	Domestic-based team of Korean expatriates
Dalian Shide Siwu	2008	Queenstown	Queenstown Stadium	Satellite club of Dalian Shide of China
DPMM	2008–2020, 2023–2025	Bandar Seri Begawan (Brunei)	Hassanal Bolkiah National Stadium	Club based in Brunei
Beijing Guoan Talent	2010	Yishun	Yishun Stadium	Satellite club of Beijing Guoan of China
Étoile	2010–2011	Queenstown	Queenstown Stadium	Domestic-based team of French expatriates
Harimau Muda A	2012	Yishun	Yishun Stadium	Malaysian youth national teams playing as clubs
Harimau Muda B	2013–2015	Johor Bahru (Malaysia); Malacca (Malaysia, 2015)	Pasir Gudang Stadium; Hang Jebat Stadium	Malaysian youth national teams playing as clubs

Years indicates seasons active in the league.
Domestic-based are clubs that are predominately foreign which are based in Singapore.

== Sponsorship ==
After an inaugural season with no sponsorship, the league was sponsored by Great Eastern from 2009 until 2018 when Yeo's and Hyundai became the joint sponsors, during which time it was known as the Great Eastern-Yeo's S.League and the Great Eastern-Hyundai S.League. In 2019, a Hong Kong-based multinational insurance and finance corporation sponsored the league as their main sponsor. For the 2018 season, the league was rebranded as the Singapore Premier League.

Period	League name	Sponsor	Brand
1996–2008	S.League	No sponsor	S.League
2009–2016	S.League	Great Eastern–Yeo's	Great Eastern–Yeo's S.League
2017	S.League	Great Eastern–Hyundai	Great Eastern–Hyundai S.League
2018	Singapore Premier League	Great Eastern–Hyundai	Great Eastern–Hyundai Singapore Premier League
2019–present	Singapore Premier League	AIA	AIA Singapore Premier League

== Qualification for Asian competitions ==
The league's winners qualify for the AFC Champions League 2, the same as the Singapore Cup winners. Foreign clubs are ineligible to represent the Football Association of Singapore in AFC continental competitions. The qualification spot is given to the next best-placed local club in the league if a foreign club wins any of the two competitions.

== Champions ==
Warriors (formerly Singapore Armed Forces) hold the most titles at nine. In 2010, Étoile became the first foreign side to win the competition.

#	Season	Champions	Runners-up
1	1996 (Note: The inaugural season of the S.League was split into two series. The winners of each series completed in a championship playoff in which Geylang United defeated Singapore Armed Forces to claim the first S.League title.)	Geylang United	Singapore Armed Forces
2	1997	Singapore Armed Forces	Tiong Bahru United
3	1998	Singapore Armed Forces (2)	Tanjong Pagar United
4	1999	Home United	Singapore Armed Forces
5	2000	Singapore Armed Forces (3)	Tanjong Pagar United
6	2001	Geylang United (2)	Singapore Armed Forces
7	2002	Singapore Armed Forces (4)	Home United
8	2003	Home United (2)	Geylang United
9	2004	Tampines Rovers	Home United
10	2005	Tampines Rovers (2)	Singapore Armed Forces
11	2006	Singapore Armed Forces (5)	Tampines Rovers
12	2007	Singapore Armed Forces (6)	Home United
13	2008	Singapore Armed Forces (7)	Super Reds
14	2009	Singapore Armed Forces (8)	Tampines Rovers
15	2010	Étoile	Tampines Rovers
16	2011	Tampines Rovers (3)	Home United
17	2012	Tampines Rovers (4)	DPMM
18	2013	Tampines Rovers (5)	Home United
19	2014	Warriors (9)	DPMM
20	2015	DPMM	Tampines Rovers
21	2016	Albirex Niigata (S)	Tampines Rovers
22	2017	Albirex Niigata (S) (2)	Tampines Rovers
23	2018	Albirex Niigata (S) (3)	Home United
24	2019	DPMM (2)	Tampines Rovers
25	2020	Albirex Niigata (S) (4)	Tampines Rovers
26	2021	Lion City Sailors (3)	Albirex Niigata (S)
27	2022	Albirex Niigata (S) (5)	Lion City Sailors
28	2023	Albirex Niigata (S) (6)	Lion City Sailors
29	2024–25	Lion City Sailors (4)	BG Tampines Rovers
30	2025–26	Lion City Sailors (5)	BG Tampines Rovers
31	2026–27		

Invited club

=== Performances by club ===
Clubs in bold compete in the current season. Italics indicates defunct club.

Club	Champions	Runners-up	Winning seasons	Runners-up seasons
Warriors	9	4	1997, 1998, 2000, 2002, 2006, 2007, 2008, 2009, 2014	1996, 1999, 2001, 2005
**FC Jurong**	6	1	2016, 2017, 2018, 2020, 2022, 2023	2021
**Tampines Rovers**	5	10	2004, 2005, 2011, 2012, 2013	2006, 2009, 2010, 2015, 2016, 2017, 2019, 2020, 2024–25, 2025–26
**Lion City Sailors**	5	8	1999, 2003, 2021, 2024–25, 2025–26	2002, 2004, 2007, 2011, 2013, 2018, 2022, 2023
DPMM	2	2	2015, 2019	2012, 2014
**Geylang International**	2	1	1996, 2001	2003
Étoile	1	0	2010	
**Tanjong Pagar United**	0	3		1997, 1998, 2000
Super Reds	0	1		2008

Invited club

== Awards ==
=== Prize money ===
As of the 2026–27 season, FAS has introduced the following prize money for finishing in the subsequent league positions, with a total prize pot of $1,000,000. Prize money amounts are in Singapore dollars:

- Champions: $250,000
- Runner-up: $230,000
- Third place: $220,000
- Fourth place: $140,000
- Fifth place: $100,000
- Sixth place: $60,000

== All-time league table ==
The all-time Singapore Premier League table is a cumulative record of all match results, points and goals of every club that has played in the league since its inception in 1996. The table that follows is accurate as of the end of the 2025–26 season. Clubs in bold are part of the 2026–27 season.

Pos	Club	No. of seasons	Pld	W (PK) (Note: The 2003 edition of the S.League saw the introduction of penalty shootouts if a match ended a draw. Shootout winners were awarded an extra point on top of the draw.)	D	L	GF	GA	GD	Pts
1	**Tampines Rovers**	29	741	404 (3)	149	185	1,483	930	+553	**1,367**
2	Warriors ^{a}	24	654	371 (2)	121	160	1,407	865	+542	1,238
3	Home United	24	654	357 (2)	123	172	1,309	853	+456	1,198
4	**Geylang International** ^{a}	29	741	301 (3)	148	300	1,160	1,169	−9	**1,067**
5	Albirex Niigata (S) ^{h}	21	555	290	120	143	1,069	754	+315	**1,032**
6	**Balestier Khalsa**	29	741	222 (2)	160	379	1,038	1,442	−404	**791**
7	Woodlands Wellington ^{c}	19	531	167 (4)	120	240	743	930	−187	623
8	**Young Lions**	20	588	143 (1)	112	332	698	1,181	−483	**538**
9	**Tanjong Pagar United**	16	425	138 (2)	86	190	600	755	−155	**499**
10	Gombak United	12	346	114	88	144	462	528	−66	432
11	**Hougang United** ^{f}	14	342	120	65	157	532	612	−80	**400**
12	DPMM ^{d}	9	225	103	48	74	414	333	+81	**357**
13	Jurong Town	7	179	70 (7)	29	73	261	274	−13	253
14	**Lion City Sailors** ^{g}	5	108	73	18	17	343	131	+212	**237**
15	Sembawang Rangers	8	207	53 (5)	47	102	256	409	−149	216
16	Super Reds	3	96	41	20	35	144	146	−2	143
17	Étoile ^{f}	2	66	42	11	13	119	59	+60	132
18	Clementi Khalsa	4	110	22	29	59	150	261	−111	95
19	Sinchi ^{b}	3	87	22 (6)	13	46	109	167	−58	88
20	Harimau Muda B	3	81	23	14	44	90	150	−60	83
21	Harimau Muda A	1	24	13	3	8	37	23	+14	42
22	Beijing Guoan Talent ^{e}	1	33	10	6	17	30	49	−19	31
23	Liaoning Guangyuan	1	33	8	5	20	33	63	−30	29
24	Sporting Afrique	1	30	5	9	26	36	59	−23	24
25	Dalian Shide Siwu	1	33	5	7	21	26	75	−55	22
26	Paya Lebar Punggol	1	27	1	1	25	23	78	−55	4
27	FC Jurong ^{h}									

- a: Does not include the title playoff match at the end of 1996 Season. Geylang United defeated Singapore Armed Forces 2–1 to clinch the S.League title.
- b: Sinchi FC had 3 points deducted for gross misconduct in 2005.
- c: Woodlands Wellington had 6 points deducted for match walkout in 2007.
- d: 2009 results involving DPMM were annulled due to a FIFA ban so season its not calculated.
- e: Young Lions and Beijing Guoan Talent had 5 points deducted each for gross misconduct in 2010.
- f: Étoile and Hougang United had 5 points deducted each for pre-match brawl in 2011.
- g: Lion City Sailors (formerly Home United) is part of a new entity club from the 2020 season onwards.
- h: FC Jurong is part of a new entity club (formerly Albirex Niigata Singapore) after transitioning to become a fully local club from the 2026–27 season onwards.

== Records and statistics ==
=== Club records ===
- Most titles: 9, Warriors
- Most consecutive title wins: 4, Warriors (2006, 2007, 2008, 2009)
- Biggest title-winning margin: 23 points, 2018; Albirex Niigata (S) (66 points) over Home United (43 points)
- Most points in a season: 84, SAFFC (2002)
- Most wins in a season: 26, SAFFC (2002)
- The biggest home win: 9–0
  - SAFFC vs Sembawang Rangers (15 June 2002)
  - Tampines Rovers vs Tanjong Pagar United (16 March 2004)
- The biggest away win: 1–10
  - Young Lions vs Lion City Sailors (13 August 2022)
- Matches with most goals: 4–9
  - Hougang United vs Lion City Sailors (26 August 2022)
- Most defeats in a season: 25, Gombak United (2002)
- Most goals scored in a season: 104
  - SAFFC (2002)
  - Home United (2003)
- Most goals conceded in a season: 103, Young Lions (2022)
- Fewest goals conceded in a season: 11, Tampines Rovers (2020)

=== Player records ===
- Most league appearances: 518
  - (Singapore) Daniel Bennett
- Most goals scored: 385
  - (Singapore) Aleksandar Đurić
- Most goals scored in one match: 5
  - (Belarus) Andrey Voronkov (against Balestier Khalsa on 13 April 2019 in a 7–1 win)
  - (Japan) Reo Nishiguchi (against Young Lions on 1 October 2022 in an 8–1 win)
  - (Japan) Tsubasa Sano, 83 minute (against Young Lions on 26 May 2017 in an 8–0 win)
- Most league titles: 8
  - (Singapore) Aleksandar Đurić
- Top goal scorer in a single league season: 44
  - (Singapore) Tomoyuki Doi (2024–25 season)
- Most different clubs played for: 8
  - (Singapore) Farizal Basri (Tampines Rovers, Young Lions, SAFFC, Balestier Khalsa, Geylang United, Sengkang Punggol, Home United and Woodlands Wellington)
- Oldest player:
  - (Brunei) Alizanda Sitom, 46 years, 9 months, 26 days (for DPMM vs Home United on 25 May 2017)
- Oldest outfield player:
  - (Singapore) Daniel Bennett, 44 years, 9 months, 13 days (for Tanjong Pagar United vs Tampines Rovers on 20 October 2022)
- Oldest goal scorers:
  - (Singapore) Daniel Bennett ~ 44 years, 7 months, 27 days old (on 3 September 2022 vs Hougang United)
- Youngest player:
  - (Singapore) Nathan Mao, 15 years, 5 days (for Lion City Sailors vs Tampines Rovers on 31 March 2023)
- Youngest goal scorers:
  - (Brunei) Hakeme Yazid Said, 16 years, 5 months, 25 days (for DPMM vs Geylang International on 2 August 2019)
- Most seasons appeared in: 26
  - (Singapore) Daniel Bennett (from 1996 to 2022)

=== Coaching records ===
- Most titles won: 4
  - (Singapore) Richard Bok (2006, 2007, 2008, 2009)
  - (Japan) Kazuaki Yoshinaga (2017, 2018, 2022, 2023)
- Most matches: 123
  - (Germany) Jörg Steinebrunner (with Woodlands Wellington, Sengkang Punggol, Geylang International and Warriors)

Top 10 most appearances
Rank	Player	Years	Appearances	Goals
1	(Singapore) (England) Daniel Bennett	1996–2001, 2002, 2003–2022	513	21
2	(Singapore) Yazid Yasin	1996–2016	476	0
3	(Singapore) (Bosnia and Herzegovina) Aleksandar Đurić	1999, 2000–2014	439	385
4	(Singapore) Indra Sahdan Daud	1996–2016	419	178
5	(Singapore) (Serbia) Fahrudin Mustafić	2002–2009, 2011–2018	332	45
6	(Singapore) Yasir Hanapi	2008–2011, 2013–2017, 2018–present	317	46
7	(Singapore) Zaiful Nizam	2006–present	316	0
8	(Singapore) Fazrul Nawaz	2004–2012, 2014, 2015–2021	312	145
9	(Singapore) Noh Alam Shah	1997–2006, 2012. 2014–2015	306	126
10	(Singapore) Irwan Shah	2009–2011, 2014–2023	293	9
10	(Singapore) Shahdan Sulaiman	2006–2011, 2013–2017, 2019–present	293	46

Top 10 goalscorer
Rank	Player	Years	Appearances	Goals
1	(Singapore) (Bosnia and Herzegovina) Aleksandar Đurić	1999, 2000–2014	439	385
2	(Singapore) (Brazil) Egmar Gonçalves	1996–1998, 2000–2006	255	239
3	(Singapore) (Croatia) Mirko Grabovac	1999–2008	239	226
4	(Singapore) Indra Sahdan Daud	1996–2016	419	178
5	(Singapore) Fazrul Nawaz	2004–2012, 2014, 2015–2021	312	145
6	(Brazil) Peres de Oliveira	2001–2010	237	133
7	(Singapore) Khairul Amri	2004–2009, 2013, 2016–2019, 2021–2023	270	128
8	(Singapore) Noh Alam Shah	1997–2006, 2012. 2014–2015	306	126
9	(Singapore) (Nigeria) Agu Casmir	2002–2007, 2008–2010, 2014–2015	212	125
10	(Canada) Jordan Webb	2010–2020	243	101

== Notable foreign players ==
- Foreigner that naturalised as a Singaporean is not counted in the list.
- Only applicable as a player and not as a coach after their retirement.

List of notable players
Player	Club	Years	Notes
(Iran) Mohammad Khakpour	Geylang United	1995–1996	Khakpour went on to captain the Iran national team at the 1998 FIFA World Cup.
(Iran) Hamid Reza Estili	Geylang United	1996	Estili scored in Iran's 2–1 win over United States in the 1998 FIFA World Cup.
(New Zealand) Mark Atkinson	Sembawang Rangers	1996	Atkinson was included in the New Zealand national team squad for the 1999 Confederations Cup.
(Cameroon) Émile Mbouh	Tiong Bahru United	1997	Mbouh appeared at both the 1990 and 1994 FIFA World Cup.
(Australia) Ernie Tapai	Home United	1999–2000	Tapai was part of the Australia national team squad that claimed as runners-up at the 1997 FIFA Confederations Cup.
(Germany) Lutz Pfannenstiel	Geylang United	1999–2000	Pfannenstiel holds the record for the first footballer to play professionally in each of the six recognized continental associations.
(England) Grant Holt	Sengkang Marine	2001	Holt went on to play for Norwich City where he won the Norwich City Player of the Year award in three consecutive seasons.
(Cameroon) Basile Essa Mvondo	Woodlands Wellington	2005–2006	Mvondo appeared in the 1996 African Cup of Nations with the Cameroon national team.
(Nigeria) O. J. Obatola	Gombak United	2006–2009	
(Guinea-Bissau) Frédéric Mendy	Home United	2011–2013	Mendy played in the 2017 and the 2019 Africa Cup of Nations with Guinea-Bissau.
(Denmark) Ken Ilsø	Home United	2015–2016	
(England) Jermaine Pennant	Tampines Rovers	2016	
(Ukraine) Volodymyr Pryyomov	DPMM	2018	Won the 2009 UEFA Cup Final with Shakhtar Donetsk
(Brazil) André Moritz	Hougang United	2022	
(Brazil) Diego Lopes	Lion City Sailors	2021–2023	Lopes is the most expensive signing in the league history with a Singapore record transfer fee of SGD $2.9 million
(South Korea) Kim Shin-wook	Lion City Sailors	2022	Shin-wook was part of the South Korea national team squad that participated in the 2014 and the 2018 FIFA World Cup. He also was included in the 2011 and the 2015 AFC Asian Cup tournament.
(Japan) Tadanari Lee	Albirex Niigata (S)	2022–2023	Tadanari scored the winning goal during the 2011 AFC Asian Cup final. He also won the 2017 AFC Champions League with Urawa Red Diamonds.
(Australia) Bailey Wright	Lion City Sailors	2023–present	Wright was part of the Australia national team in the 2014 and the 2022 FIFA World Cup.
(Germany) Lennart Thy	Lion City Sailors	2024–present	Thy represented Germany at various youth levels, including winning the 2009 UEFA European Under-17 Championship, where he was the top goalscorer of the tournament. Thy also notably got awarded the FIFA Fair Play Award in 2018.

== See also ==
- Singapore Cup
- Singapore League Cup
- Singapore Community Shield
- Singapore Premier League 2
- Singapore National Football League
- Sports in Singapore
- Football in Singapore
- List of football clubs in Singapore
- Women's Premier League (Singapore)
- Singapore Premier League Award winners
- Prime League
- Singapore Selection XI
