= 2002 S.League =

S. League
- Season: 2002
- Champions: Singapore Armed Forces; 4th S.League title
- Matches played: 198
- Goals scored: 742 (3.75 per match)
- Top goalscorer: Mirko Grabovac (36 - all domestic competitions)
- Biggest home win: Singapore Armed Forces 9-0 Sembawang Rangers (15 June 2002)
- Biggest away win: Sengkang Marine 0-9 Geylang United (18 July 2002)
- Highest scoring: Sengkang Marine 5-5 Sembawang Rangers (27 July 2002); Balestier Central 4-6 Sengkang Marine (5 September 2002)

2002 S.League was the seventh season of Singapore's professional football league. It was won by Singapore Armed Forces, which was their fourth league title.

== League table ==
Pos	Team	Pld	W	D	L	GF	GA	GD	Pts
1	Singapore Armed Forces	33	26	6	1	104	37	+67	84
2	Home United	33	18	10	5	71	42	+29	64
3	Geylang United	33	17	8	8	80	39	+41	59
4	Tampines Rovers	33	16	11	6	67	39	+28	59
5	Woodlands Wellington	33	17	7	9	75	44	+31	58
6	Sembawang Rangers	33	15	5	13	59	67	−8	50
7	Jurong FC	33	13	6	14	47	48	−1	45
8	Sengkang Marine	33	11	6	16	62	84	−22	39
9	Tanjong Pagar United	33	11	4	18	49	72	−23	37
10	Clementi Khalsa	33	7	4	22	45	84	−39	25
11	Balestier Central	33	6	5	22	50	103	−53	23
12	Gombak United	33	2	6	25	33	83	−50	12

Source: RSSSF
Rules for classification: 1) points; 2) goal difference; 3) number of goals scored

== Foreign players ==
Each club is allowed to have up to a maximum of 4 foreign players.

Club	Player 1	Player 2	Player 3	Player 4	Former Player
Balestier Central	(Nigeria) Itimi Wilson	(Germany) Jörg Steinebrunner	(Nigeria) Joseph Theddeus	None	None
Clementi Khalsa	(Brazil) Leonardo Silva	(Romania) Bogdan Brasoveanu	(Nigeria) Wisdom Onyekwere	(Nigeria) Emmanuel Unaka	(Japan) Masahiro Iwata (Japan) Taichi Sato
Geylang International	(Australia) Aleksandar Đurić	(Australia) Brian Bothwell	(Australia) Nebojsa Vukosavljevic	None	None
Gombak United	(Thailand) Surachai Jaturapattarapong	(Fiji) Veresa Toma	(Senegal) Abdoulaye Diallo	None	(Nigeria) Dennis Suglo
Home United	(Japan) Hiroaki Tanaka	(Brazil) Egmar Gonçalves	(Brazil) Peres De Oliveira	(England) Billy Bone	(Spain) Edson Garcia (Thailand) Anucha Chuaysri
Jurong FC	(South Korea) Park Tae-won	(Japan) Tatsuma Yoshida	(Nigeria) Precious Emuejeraye	(Brazil) Fabio Da Silva	(South Korea) Cho Hyun-jin (Nigeria) Okoye Emeka
SAFFC	(Thailand) Therdsak Chaiman	(Croatia) Nenad Baćina	(Croatia) Mirko Grabovac	(Guinea) Ballamodou Conde	None
Sengkang Marine	(Australia) Simon Harland	(England) Daniel Hill	(England) Grant Holt	(Australia) Todd Harnwell	(England) Chris Downey
Sembawang Rangers	(Japan) Akihiro Nakamura	(Thailand) Pitipong Kuldilog	(Thailand) Tawan Sripan	(Thailand) Niweat Siriwong	None
Tampines Rovers	(Australia) Demetrios Bakis	(Australia) Paul O'Grady	(Serbia and Montenegro) Fahrudin Mustafić	(Serbia and Montenegro) Sead Muratović	(Brazil) Joselito Da Silva (Brazil) Luciano de Oliveira
Tanjong Pagar United	(Thailand) Sutee Suksomkit	(Thailand) Choketawee Promrut	(Thailand) Thawatchai Ongtrakul	(Thailand) Wolapan Toontone	
Woodlands	(England) John Wilkinson	(England) Simon Clark	(Nigeria) Itimi Dickson	(Nigeria) Agu Casmir	(Thailand) Anuruck Srikerd

== Top goalscorers ==
Rank	Name	Club	Goals
1	(Croatia) Mirko Grabovac	Singapore Armed Forces	36
2	(Singapore) Aleksandar Đurić	Geylang United	32
3	(Thailand) Therdsak Chaiman	Singapore Armed Forces	27
4	(Nigeria) Agu Casmir	Woodlands Wellington	26
5	(Singapore) Noh Alam Shah	Sembawang Rangers	24
6	(Nigeria) Itimi Wilson	Balestier Central	23
6	(South Korea) Park Tae-Won	Jurong	23
6	(Singapore) Ismail Fitrey	Tampines Rovers	23
9	(Nigeria) Wisdom Onyekwere	Clementi Khalsa	22
10	(Singapore) Mohd Noor Ali	Geylang United	20
