= 2003 S.League =

S. League
- Season: 2003
- Champions: Home United; 2nd S.League title
- AFC Cup: Home United (S.League and Singapore Cup winners); Geylang United (S.League runners-up)
- Matches: 198
- Goals: 631 (3.19 per match)
- Top goalscorer: (Brazil) Peres de Oliveira (37 - all domestic competitions)
- Biggest home win: Geylang United 10-2 (Singapore) Young Lions (17 August 2003)
- Biggest away win: Balestier Khalsa 0-5 Singapore Armed Forces (10 May 2003)
- Highest scoring: Geylang United 10-2 (Singapore) Young Lions (17 August 2003)

2003 S.League was the eighth season of Singapore's professional football league. It was won by Home United, which was their second league title.

== League table ==
Pos	Team	Pld	W	SOW	SOL	L	GF	GA	GD	Pts	Qualification
1	Home United	33	26	2	3	2	104	42	+62	85	Qualification to AFC Cup Group Stage
2	Geylang United	33	21	3	2	7	75	30	+45	71	Qualification to AFC Cup Group Stage
3	Singapore Armed Forces	33	20	2	5	6	68	37	+31	69	
4	Tampines Rovers	33	17	3	2	11	63	40	+23	59	
5	Woodlands Wellington	33	14	4	8	7	65	47	+18	58	
6	Jurong FC	33	12	7	1	13	35	34	+1	51	
7	(China) Sinchi FC (Note: Sinchi stands for 'Singapore Chinese', a team of Chinese players.)	33	11	6	5	11	46	48	−2	50	
8	Sengkang Marine	33	7	8	1	17	32	66	−34	38	
9	Sembawang Rangers	33	6	5	7	15	37	56	−19	35	
10	Tanjong Pagar United	33	8	2	0	23	36	78	−42	28	
11	Balestier Khalsa (Note: Balestier Khalsa are a merger of Clementi Khalsa and Balestier Central.)	33	5	2	6	20	37	76	−39	25	
12	(Singapore) Young Lions (Note: Young Lions are a new team made up of under-23 national team players.)	33	6	1	5	21	33	77	−44	25	

Source: RSSSF
Rules for classification: 1) points; 2) goal difference; 3) number of goals scored. Matches proceed to a penalty shootout following a draw in regulation time. Shootout winners receive two points and shootout losers receive one point.
Notes:
Gombak United withdrew from the league at the end of the 2002 season.

== Foreign players ==
Each club is allowed to have up to a maximum of 4 foreign players.

Club	Player 1	Player 2	Player 3	Player 4	Former Player
Balestier Khalsa	(South Korea) Kim Eun-cher	(South Korea) Jang Min-suk	(South Korea) Choi Seung-bum	(Nigeria) Joseph Theddeus	(Nigeria) Wisdom Onyekwere (Nigeria) Itimi Wilson
Geylang International	(Australia) Peter Bennett	(Australia) Aleksandar Đurić	(Australia) Brendon Šantalab	(Australia) PJ Roberts	(England) Marcus Phillips (Thailand) Surachai Jirasirichote
Home United	(Thailand) Sutee Suksomkit	(Thailand) Surachai Jaturapattarapong	(England) Billy Bone	(Brazil) Peres De Oliveira	None
Jurong FC	(South Korea) Park Tae-won	(Nigeria) Okoye Emeka	(Nigeria) Precious Emuejeraye	(Brazil) Fabio Da Silva	None
SAFFC	(Thailand) Pongsak Khongkeaw	(Japan) Akihiro Nakamura	(Croatia) Nenad Baćina	(Guinea) Ballamodou Conde	(Nigeria) Igwe Iroha (Croatia) Ante Hrgović
Sengkang Marine	(Australia) Shane Pryce	(England) Daniel Hill	(England) Jason White	(Serbia and Montenegro) Fahrudin Mustafić	None
Sembawang Rangers	(Thailand) Pitipong Kuldilog	(Thailand) Supakit Jinajai	(Thailand) Tawan Sripan	(Thailand) Cumpee Pinthakul	(Thailand) Teerasak Po-on (Japan) Akihiro Nakamura
Tampines Rovers	(Australia) Bradley Groves	(Australia) Demetrios Bakis	(Australia) George Goutzioulis	(Serbia and Montenegro) Sead Muratović	None
Tanjong Pagar United	(Thailand) Choketawee Promrut	(Japan) Hiroaki Tanaka	(Nigeria) Adejumo Smith	(Australia) Kris Trajanovski	None
Woodlands	(England) John Wilkinson	(England) Simon Clark	(Nigeria) Itimi Dickson	(Nigeria) Agu Casmir	None
(Singapore) Young Lions FC	(Nigeria) Precious Emuejeraye	None	None	None	None

- Albirex Niigata (S) and Sinchi FC are not allowed to hire any foreigners.

== Top scorers ==
Rank	Name	Club	Goals
1	(Brazil) Peres de Oliveira	Home United	37
2	(Bosnia and Herzegovina) (Australia) Aleksandar Đurić	Geylang United	32
3	(Brazil) Egmar Goncalves	Home United	29
4	Indra Sahdan Daud	Home United	26
5	(China) Chang Hui	(China) Sinchi FC	24
6	(Australia) Brendon Santalab	Geylang United	23
6	Noh Alam Shah	Tampines Rovers	23
8	(Thailand) Pitipong Kuldilog	Sembawang Rangers	21
9	Mirko Grabovac	Singapore Armed Forces	20
10	(Nigeria) Itimi Dickson	Woodlands Wellington	18
11	(Australia) George Goutzioulis	Tampines Rovers	17
12	(Nigeria) Agu Casmir	Woodlands Wellington	15
13	(England) Jason White	Sengkang Marine	14
13	(Guinea) Ballamodou Conde	Singapore Armed Forces	14
15	Fadzuhasny Juraimi	Tanjong Pagar United	11
15	(England) John Wilkinson	Woodlands Wellington	11
17	Jamil Ali	Geylang United	10
17	Aliff Shafaein	(Singapore) Young Lions	10
19	(South Korea) Kim Eun-Cher	Balestier Khalsa	9
19	(Thailand) Sutee Suksomkit	Home United	9
19	(Japan) Hiroaki Tanaka	Tanjong Pagar United	9
