= 2001 S.League =

S. League
- Season: 2001
- Champions: Geylang United; 2nd S.League title
- AFC Champions League: Geylang United (S.League winners); Home United (Singapore Cup winners)
- Matches played: 198
- Goals scored: 689 (3.48 per match)
- Top goalscorer: (Croatia) Mirko Grabovac (42)
- Biggest home win: Singapore Armed Forces 8-2 Tampines Rovers (18 August 2001)
- Biggest away win: Sembawang Rangers 0-6 Singapore Armed Forces (30 March 2001)
- Highest scoring: Singapore Armed Forces 8-2 Tampines Rovers (18 August 2001)

2001 S.League was the sixth season of Singapore's professional football league. It was won by Geylang United, which was their second league title.

== League table ==
Pos	Team	Pld	W	D	L	GF	GA	GD	Pts	Qualification
1	Geylang United	33	23	7	3	84	28	+56	76	Qualification to AFC Champions League qualifying round
2	Singapore Armed Forces	33	24	2	7	101	46	+55	74	
3	Home United	33	23	3	7	69	36	+33	72	Qualification to AFC Champions League qualifying round (Note: Qualified as 2001 Singapore Cup winners.)
4	Tanjong Pagar United	33	18	6	9	68	47	+21	60	
5	Jurong FC	33	15	6	12	65	57	+8	51	
6	Tampines Rovers	33	14	6	13	60	55	+5	48	
7	Balestier Central	33	8	11	14	43	57	−14	35	
8	Sembawang Rangers	33	8	7	18	45	80	−35	31	
9	Clementi Khalsa	33	7	9	17	43	76	−33	30	
10	Gombak United	33	8	4	21	36	72	−36	28	
11	Marine Castle United	33	7	6	20	35	71	−36	27	
12	Woodlands Wellington	27	3	5	19	40	64	−24	14	

Source: RSSSF
Rules for classification: 1) points; 2) goal difference; 3) number of goals scored

== Foreign players ==
Each club is allowed to have up to a maximum of 4 foreign players.

Club	Player 1	Player 2	Player 3	Player 4	Player 5 (Prime League)	Former Player
Balestier Central	(Thailand) Daorueang Krongpol	(Australia) Darren Stewart	(Australia) Josip Kozic	(Brazil) Fabio Da Silva	(Nigeria) Itimi Wilson	None
Clementi Khalsa	(Japan) Michiaki Kakimoto	(Japan) Hiroyuki Ishida	(Australia) Vlado Bozinovski	(Australia) Grant Barlow	(Nigeria) Emmanuel Unaka	(Australia) Ernie Tapai (Nigeria) Wisdom Onyekwere
Geylang International	(Australia) Aleksandar Đurić	(Australia) Brian Bothwell	(Australia) Nebojsa Vukosavljevic	(England) William Bone	(Nigeria) Emeka Henry Okoro	None
Gombak United	(Thailand) Surachai Jaturapattarapong	(Thailand) Choketawee Promrut	(Senegal) Abdoulaye Diallo	(Guinea) Ballamodou Conde	(Denmark) Nikolaj Lund	(Australia) Alioune Badara (Morocco) Merzagua Abderrazak
Home United	(Australia) George Kulcsar	(Brazil) Edson Garcia	(Brazil) Egmar Gonçalves	(Brazil) Peres De Oliveira	(Brazil) Bebe A Jones	(Australia) Hrvoje Matković (Brazil) Paulo Morellato (Brazil) Jacksen F. Tiago (Iran) Amir Tavakolian
Jurong FC	(South Korea) Park Tae-won	(Croatia) Velimir Crljen	(Croatia) Marko Kraljević	(Croatia) Bojan Hodak	(Nigeria) Itimi Dickson	(Croatia) Igor Čeko
Marine Castle	(Australia) Anthony Carbone	(England) Barrie Keeling	(England) Michael Lomax	(England) Tom English	(Nigeria) Emmanuel Dogbe	None
SAFFC	(Thailand) Kiatisuk Senamuang	(Croatia) Nenad Baćina	(Croatia) Veselko Paponja	(Thailand) Vimon Juncum	(Croatia) Goran Galov	None
Sembawang Rangers	(Thailand) Thawatchai Ongtrakul	(Thailand) Bamrung Boonprom	(Thailand) Tawan Sripan	(Thailand) Niweat Siriwong	(Thailand) Teerasak Po-on	None
Tampines Rovers	(Nigeria) Prince Jasper Emaviwe	(Serbia and Montenegro) Sead Muratović	(Brazil) Luciano Gomes De Oliveira	(Brazil) Marcelo Da Silva	(Brazil) Dennis Suglo	(Brazil) Adilson J De Paula (Brazil) Adriano Reis
Tanjong Pagar United	(Australia) Hamilton Thorp	(Thailand) Phanuwat Yinphan	(France) Djamel Achouri	(Croatia) Dragan Talajić	(Thailand) Sutee Suksomkit	(Croatia) Davor Dželalija
Woodlands	(Japan) Dan Ito	(Croatia) Miroslav Kuljanac	(Croatia) Esad Sejdic	(Croatia) Petar Dajak	(Liberia) Emmett Gassco	(Thailand) Surachai Jirasirichote (Croatia) Joško Parać (Croatia) Ivica Raguž

== Top scorers ==
Rank	Name	Club	Goals
1	(Croatia) Mirko Grabovac	Singapore Armed Forces	42
2	(Bosnia and Herzegovina) (Australia) Aleksandar Đurić	Geylang United	34
3	(Brazil) Egmar Goncalves	Home United	28
4	(Australia) Brian Bothwell	Geylang United	23
5	Indra Sahdan Daud	Home United	22
6	(Brazil) Peres de Oliveira	Home United	21
7	(South Korea) Park Tae-Won	Jurong	18
8	(England) Tom English	Marine Castle United	15
9	(Japan) Michiaki Kakimoto	Clementi Khalsa	14
9	Toh Choon Ming	Jurong	14
9	(Thailand) Kiatisuk Senamuang	Singapore Armed Forces	14
