= 2000 S.League =

S. League
- Season: 2000
- Champions: Singapore Armed Forces; 3rd S.League title
- Asian Club Championship: Singapore Armed Forces
- Matches: 132
- Goals: 379 (2.87 per match)
- Top goalscorer: (Croatia) Mirko Grabovac (19)
- Biggest home win: Geylang United 7-1 Marine Castle United (28 April 2000)
- Biggest away win: Marine Castle United 0-7 Tanjong Pagar United (21 July 2000)
- Highest scoring: Geylang United 7-1 Marine Castle United (28 April 2000); Singapore Armed Forces 6-2 Balestier Central (17 June 2000); Singapore Armed Forces 6-2 Sembawang Rangers (4 August 2000)

The 2000 S.League was the fifth season of the S-League, the top professional football league in Singapore. It was won by Singapore Armed Forces, their third league title.

== Teams ==
S.League had been expanding with addition of new clubs for every season since its beginnings, the 2000 season was the first season without any new club addition. All clubs were playing at the designated home stadiums which lead to building their identities within their local communities.

Location of teams in 2000 S.League

Team	Stadium	Capacity	Location
Balestier Central	Toa Payoh Stadium	3,900	Toa Payoh
Geylang United	Bedok Stadium	3,900	Bedok
Gombak United	Bukit Gombak Stadium	3,000	Bukit Batok
Clementi Khalsa	Clementi Stadium	4,000	Clementi
Jurong	Jurong East Stadium	2,700	Jurong East
Home United	Bishan Stadium	4,000	Bishan
Marine Castle	Hougang Stadium	3,000	Hougang
Singapore Armed Forces	Jurong Stadium	6,000	Jurong
Sembawang Rangers	Yishun Stadium	3,400	Yishun
Tampines Rovers	Tampines Stadium	3,600	Tampines
Tanjong Pagar United	Queenstown Stadium	3,800	Queenstown
Woodlands Wellington	Woodlands Stadium	4,300	Woodlands

== Foreign players ==
Each club is allowed to have up to a maximum of 4 foreign players.

Club	Player 1	Player 2	Player 3	Player 4	Prime League	Former Players
Balestier Central	(Australia) Darren Stewart	(Brazil) Fabio Da Silva	(Brazil) Eduardo Ribeiro	(England) Jason Ainsley	(Nigeria) Itimi Wilson	None
Clementi Khalsa	(Cameroon) Emile Mbeya	(Nigeria) Abubakri Acheampong	(Romania) Bogdan Brasoveanu	None	(Nigeria) Emmanuel Unaka	None
Geylang International	(Australia) Brian Bothwell	(England) Gavin Wilkinson	(England) Billy Bone	(Germany) Lutz Pfannenstiel	(Ghana) Emmanuel Dogbe	None
Gombak United	(Thailand) Jaturapattarapong	(Thailand) Surachai Jirasirichote	(Denmark) Jorgen Nielsen	(Guinea) Ballamodou Conde	(Guinea) Diallo Abdoulaye	(Thailand) Niweat Siriwong
Home United	(Australia) Ernie Tapai	(Brazil) Egmar Gonçalves	(Denmark) Brian Kristensen	(Denmark) Rene Anderson	None	(Australia) Aleksandar Đurić
Jurong FC	(Brazil) Joselito Da Silva	(England) Paul Masefield	(Croatia) Bojan Hodak	(Croatia) Hrvoje Ratković	None	(Australia) Mirko Jurilj
Marine Castle	(South Korea) Kim See-man	(Australia) Michael Garcia	(Croatia) Davor Višić	(England) Thomas Andersen	None	None
SAFFC	(Croatia) Mirko Grabovac	(Croatia) Nenad Baćina	(Croatia) Veselko Paponja	(Croatia) Vinko Marača	None	None
Sembawang Rangers	(Thailand) Thawatchai Ongtrakul	(Bosnia and Herzegovina) Milomir Šešlija	(Thailand) Tawan Sripan	None	None	None
Tampines Rovers	(Croatia) Marko Kraljević	(Serbia and Montenegro) Rešad Sejdić	(Serbia and Montenegro) Sead Muratović	(Serbia and Montenegro) Esad Sejdić	(Ghana) Dennis Suglo	(Bosnia and Herzegovina) Fahrudin Aličković (Serbia and Montenegro) Dejan Dimić (Guinea) Moussa Keita (Serbia and Montenegro) Hasan Plojović
Tanjong Pagar United	(Croatia) Davor Dželalija	(Senegal) Boubacar Seck	(Senegal) Nicodeme Boucher	(Croatia) Dragan Talajić	None	None
Woodlands	(Croatia) Miroslav Kuljanac	(Croatia) Ivica Raguž	(Germany) Nikolai Foroutan	(England) Max Nicholson	None	(Croatia) Ante Konjević

== League table ==
Pos	Team	Pld	W	D	L	GF	GA	GD	Pts	Qualification
1	Singapore Armed Forces	22	16	4	2	53	15	+38	52	Qualification to Asian Club Championship first round
2	Tanjong Pagar United	22	12	7	3	50	23	+27	43	
3	Geylang United	22	13	2	7	42	29	+13	41	
4	Home United	22	11	7	4	38	21	+17	40	
5	Gombak United	22	11	4	7	33	26	+7	37	
6	Jurong FC	22	8	5	9	30	37	−7	29	
7	Tampines Rovers	22	7	6	9	30	27	+3	27	
8	Clementi Khalsa	22	5	10	7	33	46	−13	25	
9	Sembawang Rangers	22	5	7	10	17	37	−20	22	
10	Woodlands Wellington	22	4	5	13	19	31	−12	17	
11	Marine Castle United	22	4	4	14	18	45	−27	16	
12	Balestier Central	22	3	5	14	16	42	−26	14	

Source: RSSSF
Rules for classification: 1) points; 2) goal difference; 3) number of goals scored

== Top scorer ==
Rank	Name	Club	Goals
1	(Croatia) Mirko Grabovac	Singapore Armed Forces	19
