= Obren Kljajić =

Australian footballer (born 2003)

Personal information
- Full name: Obren Kljajić
- Date of birth: 18 September 2003 (age 23)
- Place of birth: Brisbane, Australia
- Height: 1.86 m (6 ft 1 in)
- Position: Midfielder

Team information
- Current team: Rochedale Rovers

Youth career
- 2019–2021: Brisbane Roar

Senior career*
Years	Team	Apps	(Gls)
2022	Voždovac	2	(0)
2022–2023	Rochedale Rovers	0	(0)
2023–2024	Peninsula Power	6	(2)
2024–2025	Lion City Sailors	12	(1)
2025	Wollongong Wolves	0	(0)
2026–	Rochedale Rovers	0	(0)

International career^{‡}
2020	Bosnia and Herzegovina U18	2	(0)
- * Club domestic league appearances and goals as of 24 September 2025 ‡ National team caps and goals as of 9 April 2025

Obren Kljajić (born 18 September 2003) is a professional footballer who plays for Queensland Premier League club Rochedale Rovers. Born in Australia, he has represented Bosnia and Herzegovina at youth level.

== Club career ==
=== Brisbane Roar ===
Kljajić is joined the Brisbane Roar in 2019, playing for the under-21 side.

=== Voždovac ===
In January 2022, Kljajić signed for Serbian SuperLiga side with FK Voždovac. He made his debut in the 2022–23 season, on 18 July 2022, in a 0–0 draw against Napredak Kruševac. His next, which was also his final appearance for the club, was a 1–0 win against Radnički 1923 on 6 August 2022.

=== Rochedale Rovers ===
Kljajić joined National Premier Leagues Queensland club Rochedale Rovers on 16 August 2022.

=== Pre-season training with Lion City Sailors ===
In search for a new club, Kljajić first trained with the Singapore Premier League club Lion City Sailors in the 2023 pre-season.

=== Peninsula Power ===
In July 2023, Kljajić signed for National Premier Leagues Queensland club Peninsula Power. He scored his first professional goal in a 2–2 draw against Queensland Lions on 8 July 2023. He scored his second goal a few days later on 14 July in a 2–0 win against Olympic FC. Kljajić first played against an A-League Men top flight in the 2023 Australia Cup against Wellington Phoenix. He made a total of 7 appearances and 2 goals across all competitions.

=== Lion City Sailors ===
On 2 April 2024, it was announced that Kljajić would join Singapore Premier League club Lion City Sailors for the 2024–25 season alongside his younger brother, Novak. Kljajić will fill the second of three permitted under-21 foreign players' slots. Kljajić made his competitive debut and won his first piece of silverware for the Singaporean side in the 2024 Singapore Community Shield. The final saw the Sailors winning 2–0 against Albirex Niigata (S) on 4 May 2024. Obren stood out as the Sailors' main threat down the left flank, with his runs and crosses into the box. Kljajić scored his first goal for the club in the season opener against Hougang United. Kljajić scored in the 88th minute, sealing the 4–1 win on 10 May 2025.

Kljajić made his AFC Champions League Two debut in the group stage of the 2024–25 AFC Champions League Two against Zhejiang Professional. Kljajić and the Sailors finished as a runner-up in the 2025 AFC Champions League Two final against Sharjah after a 1–2 defeat.

On 10 June 2025, it was announced that Kljajić would be leaving the club.

== International career ==
Kljanić represented the Bosnia and Herzegovina U18 in 2020, making 2 appearances for the team.

== Style of play ==
Lion City Sailors head coach Aleksandar Ranković described Kljajić as a versatile player with willingness to adapt to what the team needs. He can play in front, left-back and winger.

== Career statistics ==
=== Club ===
As of match played 14 May 2025

Appearances and goals by club, season and competition
Club	Season	League			National cup		League cup		Continental		Other		Total	
Club	Season	Division	Apps	Goals	Apps	Goals	Apps	Goals	Apps	Goals	Apps	Goals	Apps	Goals
Voždovac	2022–23	Serbian SuperLiga	2	0	0	0	0	0	0	0	—		2	0
Rochedale Rovers	2023	National Premier Leagues Queensland	0	0	0	0	0	0	0	0	—		0	0
Peninsula Power	2023	National Premier Leagues Queensland	6	2	1	0	0	0	0	0	—		7	2
Lion City Sailors	2024–25	Singapore Premier League	12	1	1	0	0	0	4 (Note: Appearance(s) in AFC Champions League Two)	0	1 (Note: Appearance in Singapore Community Shield)	0	18	1
Career total			20	3	2	0	0	0	4	0	1	0	27	3

== Honours ==
Lion City Sailors

- AFC Champions League Two runner-up: 2025
- Singapore Premier League: 2024–25
- Singapore Cup: 2024–25
- Singapore Community Shield: 2024
