= Precious Emuejeraye =

Singaporean footballer

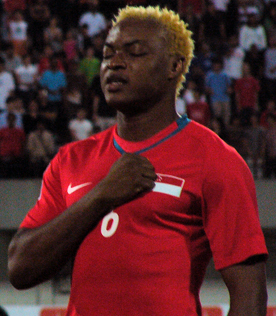
- Precious playing for Singapore in 2008

Personal information
- Full name: Precious Emuejeraye
- Date of birth: 21 March 1983 (age 43)
- Place of birth: Abeokuta, Nigeria
- Height: 1.88 m (6 ft 2 in)
- Position: Centre-back

Senior career*
Years	Team	Apps	(Gls)
2002–2003	Jurong Town	64	(1)
2003–2006	Young Lions	50	(1)
2006–2008	Gombak United	73	(4)
2008–2009	Woodlands Wellington	29	(3)
2009–2010	Sriwijaya	28	(0)
2010–2012	Persija Jakarta	52	(2)
2012–2013	Persiba Balikpapan	16	(0)
2013	Persidafon Dafonsoro	14	(0)
2014–2015	Home United	18	(0)
2015–2016	Putrajaya SPA	1	(0)
2016	Eunos Crescent		
2017–2018	Churchill Brothers	6	(0)
2019	Project Vaults Oxley		

International career
2006–2009	Singapore	61	(0)
- * Club domestic league appearances and goals

Precious Emuejeraye (born 21 March 1983) is a professional footballer who last played for Churchill Brothers in the I-League. Born in Nigeria, he plays for the Singapore national team. Now, he coaches for Euro Soccer Academy in Singapore.

== Club career ==
=== Jurong Town ===
Emuejeraye came to Singapore in 2002 from Nigeria after being signed by the now-defunct S-League side Jurong Town. He made his debut for Jurong Town on February 21, 2002, against Sembawang Rangers and scored his first goal for the club in the Singapore Cup semi-final against Geylang United in the same year.

=== Young Lions ===
Even though Jurong FC folded a year later, his impressive performances in league did not go unnoticed, as the Young Lions signed him next.

=== Gombak United ===
In 2006, Gombak United snapped up the burly defender after doing well in his 3 years with the Young Lions. He won the 2008 Singapore League Cup with the bulls.

=== Woodlands Wellington ===
He was snapped up by new Woodlands Wellington FC's coach, Nenad Bacina, who signed him for the 2009 season.

=== Move to Indonesia ===
Following the disbandment of the national team due to poor showings in the AFF Suzuki Cup, he moved to Indonesia to start afresh. He signed for Indonesia Super League club, Sriwijaya and helped the club to the 2010 Piala Indonesia.

He next move to Persija Jakarta before moving to Persiba Balikpapan. He was, however, sacked by the club following poor performances. He trained with Woodlands Wellington before being snapped up by Liga 3 club Persidafon Dafonsoro and made his debut for the club in a 3–1 loss against his former club Sriwijaya on 16 May 2013.

Persidafon Dafonsoro proved to be his last club in Indonesia as a decrease in the slots for Asian players from two to one saw him return home in 2014.

=== Home United ===
Before signing for S. League club Home United in 2014, Emuejeraye went on trials in Thailand but found that many clubs have filled their foreign signing slots. His chance at Home came as a coincidence as he was merely looking for somewhere to train to keep himself match fit and stumbled upon Home's training who coincidentally had a free slot left for registration. He was released at the end of the season.

=== Putrajaya SPA ===
Following his release by Home United, Emuejeraya was left without a club before being snapped up by Malaysia Premier League bottom-dwellers Putrajaya SPA. He had a debut to forget as he scored an own goal in a 3–1 loss to UiTM.

=== Eunos Crescent ===
Emuejeraye has failed to earn a professional contract in Singapore and played for amateur side Eunos Crescent in the National Football League (NFL), winning the title in 2016.

=== Churchill Brothers ===
It was announced in late-November 2017 that Emuejeraye has signed for I-League side Churchill Brothers, becoming the first foreign signing for the team in the upcoming season.

=== Project Vaults Oxley ===
On 28 April 2019, Project Vaults Oxley announced on their social media that Emuejeraye had returned to Singapore and joined the team. The team won the NFL Division 2 title, and achieved third-placing in the FA Cup.

== International career ==
In December 2005, he was awarded the citizenship of Singapore and the head coach of the national football team, Radojko Avramovic duly gave him his international debut in a friendly against Denmark on the 26 January 2006. He then became the third Nigerian to play for the national team, after Itimi Dickson and Agu Casmir.

His performances in the national team colours at first were met with criticisms from the supporters, citing that his speed was making the whole defence a liability. But soon, people realised that he was able to use his sheer build and strength to make up for the lack of speed and soon became a firm fixture in the first team of the national squad.

As of November 2017, Emuejeraye has earned 61 caps for the Singapore national team.

== Personal life ==
His wife is Nigerian. He is the elder brother of Alfred Emuejeraye and Emmanuel Emuejeraye. He is currently residing in Singapore with his wife and children (2 sons, 1 daughter).

== Honours ==
Gombak United

- Singapore League Cup: 2008

Sriwijaya

- Piala Indonesia: 2010

Eunos Crescent

- National Football League: 2016

Singapore

- AFF Championship: 2007
