= Mike Lomax =

English footballer (born 1979)

Personal information
- Full name: Michael John Lomax
- Date of birth: 7 December 1979 (age 46)
- Place of birth: Withington, England
- Height: 5 ft 10 in (1.78 m)
- Position: Defender

Youth career
- 199?–1998: Blackburn Rovers

Senior career*
Years	Team	Apps	(Gls)
1998–1999	Macclesfield Town	1	(0)
1999–2001	Winsford United		
2001	Marine Castle United		(1)
2002–2003	Hyde United	15	(0)
2003–200?	Trafford		
200?–2004	Salford City		
2004–200?	Woodley Sports		
2006–2007	FC United of Manchester	3	(0)
2007	Winsford United		
2007–200?	FC United of Manchester	0	(0)
- * Club domestic league appearances and goals

Michael John Lomax (born 7 December 1979) is an English former professional footballer who played as a defender in the Football League for Macclesfield Town and in the Singapore S.League for Marine Castle United. He also spent several years playing non-league football in the Greater Manchester area.

== Life and career ==
Lomax was born in Withington, Manchester, in 1979. He began his football career as a trainee with Blackburn Rovers, but never broke through to the first team, and was released in 1998.

He joined Macclesfield Town, newly promoted to the Second Division, but played almost entirely for their reserve team, earning himself a reputation as "a hard tackler with a good turn of speed". His only first-team appearance came in the final fixture of the season, on 8 May 1999 at home to Bristol Rovers, with Macclesfield's relegation already confirmed. With the score 3–3, defender Efe Sodje was sent off, and Lomax came on for the last 12 minutes, during which Bristol Rovers scored a winning goal.

Macclesfield released Lomax, and he joined Winsford United of the Northern Premier League, where he remained until early 2001. He joined Singaporean S.League club Marine Castle United for the 2001 season, as one of their permitted quota of foreigners alongside fellow Englishmen Tom English and Barrie Keeling. He played regularly, and scored once, with a 74th-minute "flashing header" from a cross to complete a 2–1 win against Clementi Khalsa on 9 June 2001.

Lomax returned to England, where he played non-league football in and around the Greater Manchester area, for Northern Premier League and North West Counties League clubs including Hyde United, Trafford, Salford City, Woodley Sports, and FC United of Manchester twice, either side of a second spell with Winsford United.
