= Fahrudin =

- Gender: Male
- Language: Bosnian

Origin
- Origin: Arabic
- Meaning: pride of faith

Other names
- Related names: Fakhr al-Din

Fahrudin is a Bosnian masculine given name. Notable people with the name include:

- Fahrudin Aličković (born 1979), Serbian retired footballer
- Fahrudin Durak (born 1966), Yugoslav retired football player
- Fahrudin Gjurgjevikj (born 1992), Bosnian wrestler
- Fahrudin Hodžić (born 1963), Bosnian football player
- Fahrudin Jusufi (1939–2019), Yugoslav footballer
- Fahrudin Kuduzović (born 1984), Bosnian-British retired footballer
- Fahrudin Melić (born 1984), Montenegrin handballer
- Fahrudin Mustafić (born 1981), Singaporean footballer
- Fahrudin Omerović (born 1961), Bosnian former footballer
- Fahrudin Pecikoza (born 1962), Bosnian songwriter
- Fahrudin Prljača (born 1944), Bosnian-Herzegovinian and Yugoslav retired footballer
- Fahrudin Radončić (born 1957), Bosnian media magnate, entrepreneur, investor, and politician
- Fahrudin Šolbić (born 1958), Bosnian professional football manager
