= Jorgen Nielsen (football manager) =

Danish football manager and former player

Personal information
- Place of birth: Denmark
- Positions: Striker; winger

Senior career*
Years	Team	Apps	(Gls)
1989–1995	VRI		
1998–2000	Gombak United		

Managerial career
- 2000–2001: Gombak United
- * Club domestic league appearances and goals

Jorgen Nielsen is a Danish former footballer and coach.

== Gombak United ==
A handball player in Denmark, Nielsen went to Singapore to work in the shipping trade. When Gombak United went from amateur to professional status, they immediately offered Nielsen a contract but he was uncertain and was not able to envisage success as a footballer. In the end, the Dane decided to join the club and after two years there, was offered the Gombak United manager job. The former striker accepted the contract, overseeing the Singaporean outfit's sales, salaries, sponsorship, merchandise, expenditures, and development of a fan club- quitting the position in April 2001.

While playing for Gombak, Nielsen got permanent residency in Singapore, allowing them to register him as a local rather than foreign footballer, recording four goals in his last season there.
