= Jurong Reptile Park =

- Interactive map of Jurong Reptile Park
- 1.3209°N 103.7089°E
- Date opened: 1988; 38 years ago
- Date closed: 2006; 20 years ago
- Location: 241 Jalan Ahmad Ibrahim, Jurong district, Singapore 629143
- Land area: 2 ha (4.9 acres)
- No. of species: 50+

The Jurong Reptile Park (also known as Jurong Reptile and Crocodile Paradise) was a 2-hectare (4.9-acre) reptile zoo located within the Boon Lay Planning Area of the Jurong district in Singapore. It was the largest reptile park in Asia.

== Animals and exhibits ==
Opened in 1988, the park had a collection of more than 50 species of reptiles including crocodiles, Komodo dragons, anacondas, pythons, king cobras, and tortoises, almost half of which were venomous. It included a walk-through iguana enclosure, a footbridge over a collection of hundreds of crocodiles, an underwater observation gallery, and the Cavern of Darkness, which simulated nighttime for the crocodiles, including Asian tropical jungle sounds.

There were crocodile feeding sessions and reptile shows. Visitors could have their pictures taken with snakes and other reptiles and reptile skin products could be purchased in the showroom.

In 1997, the reptile park sponsored the S.League Jurong Football Club and ended in 2003.

== Closure ==
The Jurong Reptile Park was the largest reptile park in Singapore when it was closed in 2006 because of other more popular zoos in Singapore such as Jurong Bird Park (a short walk across the parking lot) and the Singapore Zoo. The site is now occupied by The Village @ Jurong Hill.
