= 2025 AFC Champions League Two final =

Football match

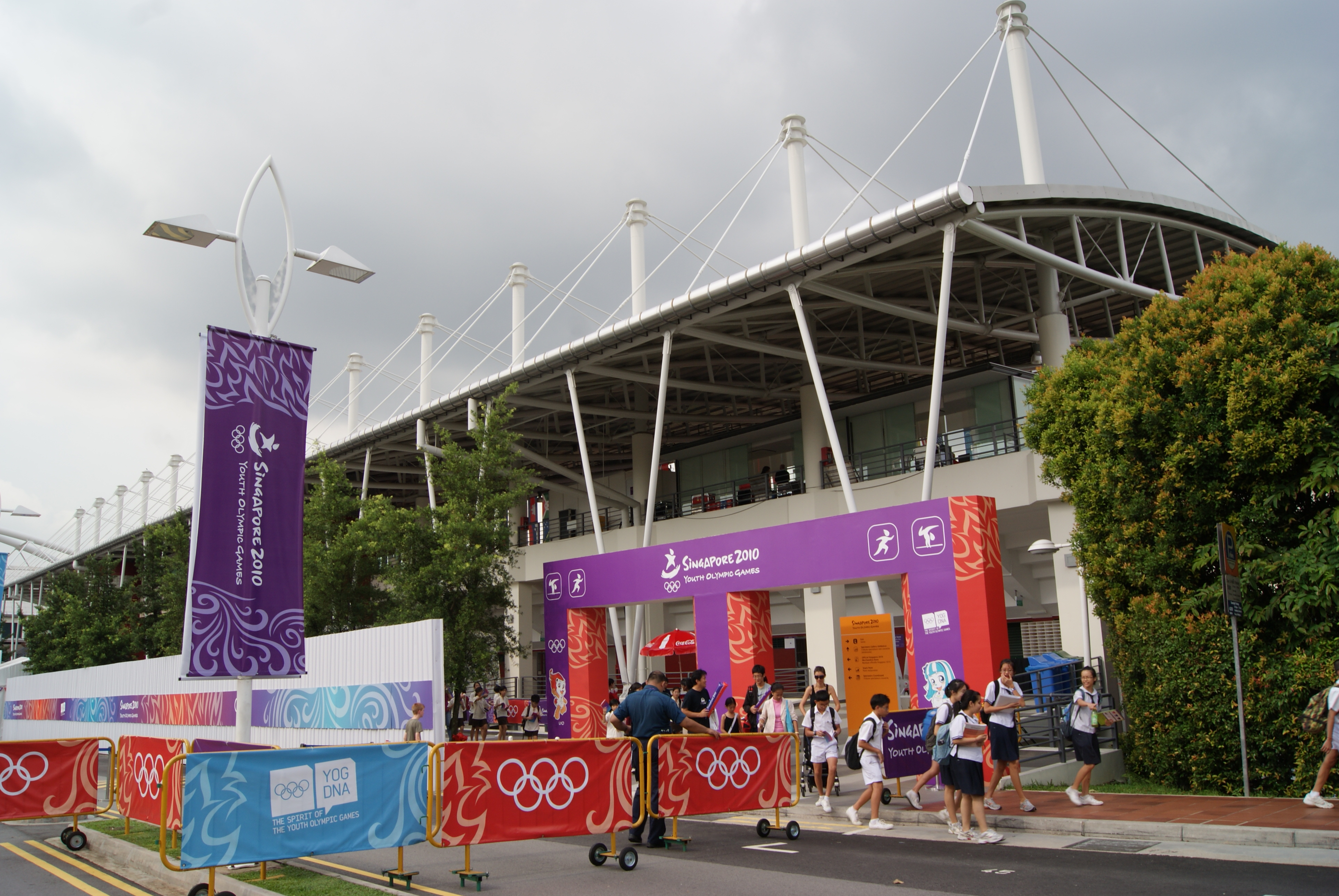
- Bishan Stadium in Singapore hosted the final
- Event: 2024–25 AFC Champions League Two
Lion City Sailors	Sharjah
(Singapore)	(United Arab Emirates)
1	2
- Date: 18 May 2025
- Venue: Bishan Stadium, Singapore
- Referee: Ammar Mahfoodh (Bahrain)
- Attendance: 9,737

The 2025 AFC Champions League Two final was the final match of the 2024–25 AFC Champions League Two, the 20th season of Asia's secondary club football tournament organised by the Asian Football Confederation (AFC), and the first since it was rebranded as the AFC Champions League Two. It was played on 18 May 2025 in Singapore.

The winners were given an indirect preliminary stage slot for the 2025–26 AFC Champions League Elite, if not already qualified through their domestic performance.

== Teams ==
Team	Region (Federation)	Previous finals appearances (bold indicates winners)
(Singapore) Lion City Sailors	East (AFF)	None
(United Arab Emirates) Sharjah	West (WAFF)	None

== Venue ==
The final venue was pre-determined on a rotation basis, with the match hosted by the Lion City Sailors in Singapore. Despite initial expectations that the final would be held at Singapore's National Stadium, the venue was unavailable due to a scheduled Lady Gaga concert on the same night. On 17 April 2025, Sharjah objected to the final taking place at Jalan Besar Stadium citing concern about the venue's artificial turf and limited seating capacity. Lion City Sailors disagreed with Sharjah’s objection, noting that the venue had hosted all of their six home matches in the tournament up to that point and was certified by the AFC to host AFC Champions League Two matches.

The AFC confirmed on 22 April 2025, that the final would be hosted at the Bishan Stadium, with necessary upgrades to the venue made ahead of the match.

== Route to the final ==
Note: In all results below, the score of the finalist is given first (H: home; A: away).

Lion City Sailors (Singapore)				Round	(United Arab Emirates) Sharjah			
Opponent	Result			Group stage	Opponent	Result		
(China) Zhejiang	2–0 (H)			Matchday 1	(Tajikistan) Istiklol	1–0 (A)		
(Indonesia) Persib Bandung	1–1 (A)			Matchday 2	(Jordan) Al-Wehdat	2–2 (H)		
(Thailand) Port	3–1 (A)			Matchday 3	(Iran) Sepahan	3–1 (H)		
(Indonesia) Persib Bandung	2–3 (H)			Matchday 4	(Iran) Sepahan	1–3 (A)		
(China) Zhejiang	2–4 (A)			Matchday 5	(Tajikistan) Istiklol	3–1 (H)		
(Thailand) Port	5–2 (A)			Matchday 6	(Jordan) Al-Wehdat	3–1 (A)		
**Group F winner**: Pos / Team / Pld / Pts; **1** / (Singapore) Lion City Sailors / **6** / **10**; 2 / (Thailand) Port / 6 / **10**; 3 / (China) Zhejiang / 6 / **9**; 4 / (Indonesia) Persib / 6 / **5**; Source: AFC				Final standings	**Group C winner**: Pos / Team / Pld / Pts; **1** / (United Arab Emirates) Sharjah / **6** / **13**; 2 / (Jordan) Al-Wehdat / 6 / **11**; 3 / (Iran) Sepahan / 6 / **10**; 4 / (Tajikistan) Istiklol / 6 / **0**; Source: AFC			
Opponent	Agg.	1st leg	2nd leg	Knockout stage	Opponent	Agg.	1st leg	2nd leg
(Thailand) Muangthong United	7–2	3–2 (A)	4–0 (H)	Round of 16	(Jordan) Al-Hussein	1–1 (a.e.t.) (3–0 p)	1–0 (A)	0–1 (H)
(Japan) Sanfrecce Hiroshima	4–1	3–0 (Note: Lion City Sailors were awarded a 0–3 victory by forfeit, after Sanfrecce Hiroshima fielded an ineligible player. The score on the field was originally a 6–1 win by Sanfrecce Hiroshima.) (A)	1–1 (H)	Quarter-finals	(United Arab Emirates) Shabab Al Ahli	2–2 (a.e.t.) (5–4 p)	1–1 (A)	1–1 (H)
(Australia) Sydney FC	2–1	2–0 (H)	0–1 (A)	Semi-finals	(Saudi Arabia) Al Taawoun	2–1	0–1 (A)	2–0 (H)

== Match ==
=== Details ===
18 May 2025
20:00 UTC+8

Lion City Sailors (Singapore)	1–2	(United Arab Emirates) Sharjah
Lestienne 90+1'	Report	Ben Larbi 74'; Meloni 90+7'

Bishan Stadium, Singapore
Attendance: 9,737
Referee: Ammar Mahfoodh (Bahrain)

**Lion City Sailors**	**Sharjah**

GK	1	(Singapore) Izwan Mahbud
CB	14	(Singapore) Hariss Harun (c)		(substituted off) 88'
CB	26	(Australia) Bailey Wright	(yellow card) 89'
CB	4	(Croatia) Toni Datković
RWB	16	(Singapore) Hami Syahin		(substituted off) 90'
LWB	29	(Portugal) Diogo Costa	(yellow card) 80'
RM	17	(Belgium) Maxime Lestienne
CM	15	(Singapore) Song Ui-young
CM	8	(Portugal) Rui Pires		(substituted off) 79'
LM	10	(Netherlands) Bart Ramselaar
CF	9	(Germany) Lennart Thy
Substitutes:
GK	13	(Singapore) Adib Azahari
GK	28	(Singapore) Zharfan Rohaizad
DF	5	(Singapore) Lionel Tan		(substituted on) 90'
DF	11	(Singapore) Hafiz Nor
DF	20	(Spain) Sergio Carmona
DF	22	(Singapore) Christopher van Huizen
DF	30	(Singapore) Akram Azman
DF	68	(Syria) Ali Al Rina
MF	6	(Singapore) Anumanthan Kumar
MF	18	(Bosnia and Herzegovina) Obren Kljajić
FW	7	(Singapore) Shawal Anuar		(substituted on) 79'
FW	21	(Singapore) Abdul Rasaq Akeem		(substituted on) 88'
Manager:
(Serbia) Aleksandar Ranković

GK	40	(United Arab Emirates) Adel Al-Hosani
RB	19	(United Arab Emirates) Khaled Ibrahim	(yellow card) 79'	(substituted off) 86'
CB	4	(United Arab Emirates) Shahin Abdulrahman (c)
CB	20	(South Korea) Cho Yu-min
LB	44	(Serbia) David Petrović		(substituted off) 81'
DM	88	(United Arab Emirates) Majed Hassan		(substituted off) 90+11'
RM	10	(Tunisia) Firas Ben Larbi	(yellow card) 45'	(substituted off) 81'
CM	22	(United Arab Emirates) Marcus Meloni
LM	11	(United Arab Emirates) Luanzinho	(yellow card) 87'	(substituted off) 90+7'
CF	30	(Guinea) Ousmane Camara
CF	7	(United Arab Emirates) Caio Lucas
Substitutes:
GK	1	(United Arab Emirates) Khaled Tawhid
GK	17	(United Arab Emirates) Mayed Mohsen
DF	3	(United Arab Emirates) Al Hassan Saleh
DF	5	(Croatia) Maro Katinić		(substituted on) 86'
DF	18	(United Arab Emirates) Abdullah Ghanem		(substituted on) 90+11'
MF	8	(United Arab Emirates) Mohammed Abdulbasit		(substituted on) 81'
MF	14	(United Arab Emirates) Khaled Ba Wazir
MF	16	(Croatia) Darko Nejašmić
MF	27	(Brazil) Guilherme Biro		(substituted on) 87'
MF	49	(Morocco) Adel Taarabt		(substituted on) 81'
FW	23	(Suriname) Tyrone Conraad
FW	55	(Cameroon) Herman Junior Kameni
Manager:
(Romania) Cosmin Olăroiu

Assistant referees:
Mohamed Salman (Bahrain)
Abdulla Al-Rowaimi (Bahrain)
Fourth official:
Mohamed Deham (Bahrain)
Fifth official:
Faisal Al-Awi (Bahrain)
Video assistant referee:
Khamis Al-Marri (Qatar)
Assistant video assistant referee:
Meshari Al-Shamari (Qatar)

**Match rules**

- 90 minutes.
- 30 minutes of extra time if tied.
- Penalty shoot-out if still tied after extra time.
- Twelve named substitutes, of which up to five may be used, with a sixth allowed in extra time. (Note: Each team was only given three opportunities to make substitutions, with a fourth opportunity in extra time, excluding substitutions made at half-time, before the start of extra time and at half-time in extra time.)

== See also ==
- 2025 AFC Champions League Elite final (1st Tier)
- 2025 AFC Challenge League final (3rd Tier)
- 2025 AFC Women's Champions League final (Women's)
