= V. Sundramoorthy =

Singaporean footballer and manager

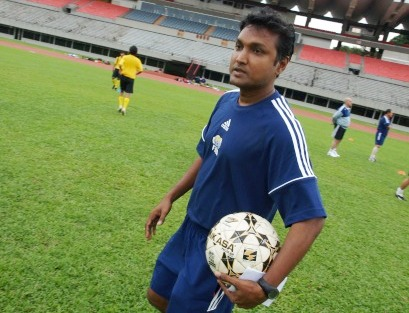

Personal information
- Full name: Varadaraju Sundramoorthy
- Date of birth: 6 October 1965 (age 61)
- Place of birth: Singapore
- Height: 1.70 m (5 ft 7 in)
- Positions: Midfielder; striker

Team information
- Current team: Laos (technical director)

Senior career*
Years	Team	Apps	(Gls)
1983–1987	Singapore	50	(45)
1987–1988	FC Basel	5	(3)
1988–1989	BSC Old Boys		
1989–1990	Kedah	48	(14)
1991–1992	Pahang		
1992–1993	Singapore		
1994	Kelantan		
1995–1997	Woodlands Wellington		
1998–2003	Jurong		

International career
1983–1995	Singapore	48	(20)

Managerial career
- 1999–2003: Jurong (player-coach)
- 2004–2007: NFA U18
- 2007–2010: Young Lions
- 2012–2013: LionsXII
- 2013: Singapore (caretaker coach)
- 2014: Negeri Sembilan
- 2014–2016: Tampines Rovers
- 2016–2018: Singapore
- 2018–2021: Laos U23
- 2018–2021: Chanthabouly (technical director)
- 2021–: Laos (technical director)
Medal record
Representing Singapore
Men's football
Southeast Asian Games
Silver medal – second place	1983 Singapore	Team
Silver medal – second place	1985 Bangkok	Team
Silver medal – second place	1989 Kuala Lumpur	Team
Bronze medal – third place	1991 Manila	Team
Bronze medal – third place	1993 Singapore	Team
- * Club domestic league appearances and goals

Varadaraju Sundramoorthy (Tamil: வரதராஜு சுந்தரமூர்த்தி; born 6 October 1965) is a former Singaporean international footballer who played in the 1980s and 1990s. Widely touted as one of the country's most talented footballers ever, Sundramoorthy is the currently the technical director of the Laos national team.

He coached the LionsXII, a Singapore-based team playing in the Malaysia Super League, and held a dual appointment as the head coach of the Under-23 team from 2011 to 2013 when he announced his plans to sign with the Malaysian Premier League team, Negeri Sembilan. After coaching Negeri Sembilan for half a season in 2014, he returned to Singapore to take the helm at Tampines Rovers for almost 2 years, then a 2-year stint as head coach of Singapore.

== Playing career ==
Sundramoorthy broke into the Singapore-Malaysia Cup team in 1983 at 18 years of age and in the following season became the top scorer in the tournament.

=== Playing in Europe ===
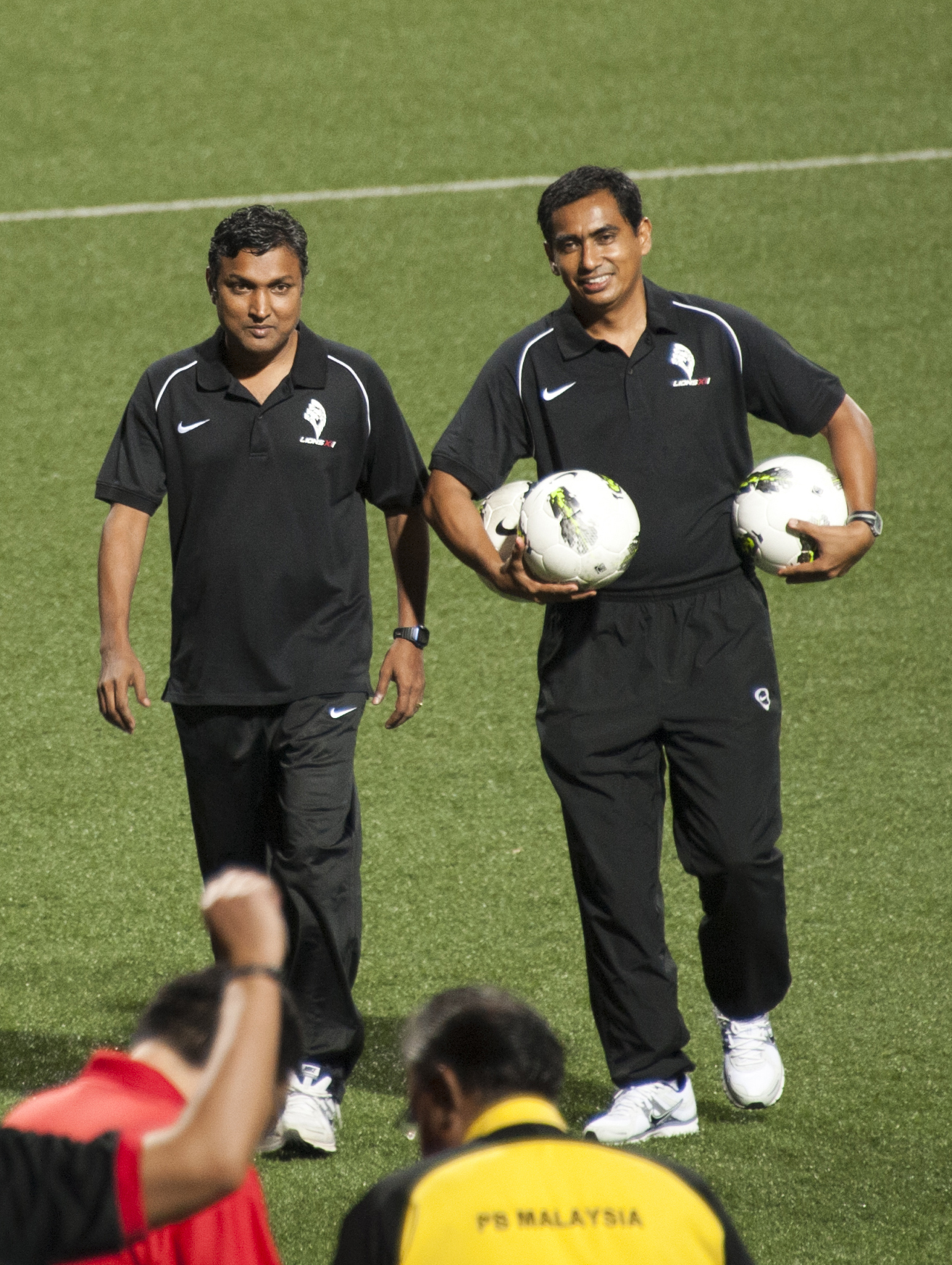
Sundramoorthy as coach of LionsXII

In 1988, Sundramoorthy became the second player from Singapore to play in Europe when he signed for Swiss club FC Basel. He played there during the second half of their 1987–88 season (the season that Basel suffered relegation) under head coach Urs Siegenthaler. After playing in eight test games, he played his first match in the Swiss Super League in an away game on 20 March 1988 against Bulle. He scored his first goal for the club in the same game as Basel won 0–2. He played solely five league games, in which scored three goals. He was released to Old Boys at the end of the season.

He then joined Kedah FA for the Malaysia Cup tournament as he returned in 1989. During his playing days in Alor Setar playing his trade for Kedah FA, Sundramoorthy helped Kedah to defeat Singapore 3–1 in the final of the 1990 Malaysia Cup, scoring Kedah's opening goal.

During Singapore's run-up to the 1993 Malaysia Cup Final appearance, Sundramoorthy was one of the most influential players in the team. He was a player well known for his dribbling skills and his finishing.

One of Sundramoorthy's most famous goals was a bicycle kick scored against Brunei in a 1993 FAM Division II League tie at the National Stadium. He also scored a spectacular backheel during his days with Jurong FC. In a match against Pahang that same year, Sundramoorthy audaciously faked a backheel that fooled the Pahang defenders before crossing for Fandi Ahmad to score the winner late in the game.

In his later days, Sundramoorthy played domestically, first turning out for Woodlands Wellington in the league's inaugural year in 1996 before moving on to become the first-ever player-coach in S.League history for Jurong FC.

Sundramoorthy was nicknamed 'The Dazzler', which was also the name of his autobiography, at the height of his prowess and 'King Cobra' when he was at Jurong.

== International career ==
Sundramoorthy made several appearances for the Singapore national football team, including at the 1990 Asian Games when he scored a hat-trick against Pakistan.

Sundramoorthy also represented Singapore in several SEA Games and helped the Lions reach the final in 1989 when his last-minute through ball led to Fandi Ahmad's winner against Indonesia. He was one of the most feared Southeast Asian strikers the 1980s and early 1990s.

== Coaching career ==
=== LionsXII ===
Since 2012 Sundramoorthy has been the head coach of the LionsXII, who played in the Malaysian Super League. In his first season in charge he led the LionsXII to 2nd place in the Malaysia Super League and the semi-finals of the Malaysia Cup.

=== Singapore national team ===
On 21 January 2013, it was announced that Sundramoorthy would be appointed caretaker coach of the Singapore national football team while the Football Association of Singapore searched for a replacement for former coach Radojko Avramović. His first game in charge was against Jordan on 6 February 2013 at Singapore's Jalan Besar Stadium.

On 15 May 2013, German coach Bernd Stange was announced as the new manager of the Singapore national football team while Sundramoorthy was appointed as the head coach of the Singapore national under-23 football team for the 2013 SEA Games. Aide Iskandar was named as his assistant.

=== Negeri Sembilan ===
On 7 October 2013, Sundramoorthy announced that he would not be renewing his contract with the Football Association of Singapore to coach the Malaysian Super League side LionsXII. He took over as head coach at Malaysia Premier League side Negeri Sembilan on a two-year contract from 1 November 2013. After finishing sixth in the 2014 Malaysia Premier League and failing to qualify for the Malaysia Cup, Sundramoorthy was relieved of his duties by Negeri Sembilan.

=== Tampines Rovers ===
In December 2014, Sundramoorthy was confirmed as the new head coach of the Tampines Rovers. This was the first time after 5 years that he held the head coach post in the S.League.

=== Second stint with the Singapore national team ===
Sundramoorthy was unveiled as the head coach of the Singapore national football team in May 2016, on a one-year contract. He extended his contract as the Lions head coach for two more years in March 2017. However, one year later, he stepped down from his role by mutual consent on 9 April 2018.

=== Laos national team ===
On 15 October 2018, Sundramoorthy became the head coach of the Laos national team where he was also tasked to helms the Laos under-23 team. He was joined by compatriot V. Selvaraj who managed Laos' youth teams and also assisting him in the senior team.

In October 2021, Sundramoorthy became the technical director of the team while Selvaraj took over his head coach position.

=== Chanthabouly ===
On the same day Sundramoorthy agreed to become the head coach of Laos, he also agreed to join Lao Premier League club Chanthabouly as their technical director.

== International goals ==
No.	Date	Venue	Opponent	Score	Result	Competition
1.	28 May 1983	Kallang, Singapore	Malaysia	2–1	2–1	1983 SEA Games
2.	9 December 1985	Bangkok, Thailand	Indonesia	1–0	1–0	1985 SEA Games
3.	24 August 1989	Kuala Lumpur, Malaysia	Thailand	1–1	1–1	1989 SEA Games
4.	26 August 1989	Kuala Lumpur, Malaysia	Myanmar	2–0	4–0	1989 SEA Games
5.	27 September 1990	Beijing, China	Pakistan	3–0	6–1	1990 Asian Games
6.	27 September 1990	Beijing, China	Pakistan	4–1	6–1	1990 Asian Games
7.	27 September 1990	Beijing, China	Pakistan	5–1	6–1	1990 Asian Games
8.	11 April 1993	Doha, Qatar	North Korea	1–0	1–2	1994 FIFA World Cup qualification
9.	13 April 1993	Doha, Qatar	Vietnam	3–1	3–2	1994 FIFA World Cup qualification
10.	18 April 1993	Kallang, Singapore	Indonesia	2–0	2–0	1994 FIFA World Cup qualification
11.	2 May 1993	Kallang, Singapore	Indonesia	2–1	2–1	1994 FIFA World Cup qualification
12.	9 June 1993	Kallang, Singapore	Philippines	6–0	7–0	1993 SEA Games
13.	11 June 1993	Kallang, Singapore	Indonesia	1–1	1–1	1993 SEA Games
14.	15 June 1993	Kallang, Singapore	Vietnam	2–0	2–0	1993 SEA Games
15.	19 June 1993	Kallang, Singapore	Indonesia	3–1	3–1	1993 SEA Games

== Honours ==
=== Player ===
Kedah

- Malaysia Cup: 1986, 1989, 1990, 1991, 1994

=== Manager ===
LionsXII

- Malaysia Super League: 2013
