= Tom English (footballer, born 1981) =

English footballer

Personal information
- Full name: Thomas English
- Date of birth: 17 November 1981 (age 44)
- Place of birth: Coventry, England
- Position: Forward

Youth career
- 1997–1998: Norwich City

Senior career*
Years	Team	Apps	(Gls)
1998–2000	Arsenal	0	(0)
2000–2001	Harwich & Parkeston		
2001	Marine Castle	31	(15)
2003–2004	Stanway Rovers		
2004	Hendon		
2004–2005	Harwich & Parkeston		
2005–2006	AFC Sudbury		
2006	Mildenhall Town		
2006	Haverhill Rovers		
2006–2007	Tiptree United		
2007	Ipswich Wanderers		
2007–2009	Tiptree United		
2009–2010	Halstead Town		
2010–2011	Heybridge Swifts		
- * Club domestic league appearances and goals

Tom English (born 17 November 1981) is an English former professional footballer who played as a forward for Arsenal where he was a member of the FA youth cup winning squad in 2000 and Marine Castle United (today Hougang United) in the Singaporean S.League in 2001. His professional career was cut short after he was seriously injured in a fall in Tenerife, though he eventually played semi-professionally for several East Anglian sides. He now works as a postman.

== Career ==
The son of former Coventry City, Leicester City and Colchester United striker Tommy English, Tom English was initially on the books of Norwich City, joining Arsenal in the summer of 1998 but making no first team appearances before being released in the summer of 2000.

After a short spell playing alongside his father at Harwich & Parkeston, in January 2001 he signed for Marine Castle United (today Hougang United) in the Singaporean S.League, where he scored fifteen goals in the 2001 season. With a move to QPR in prospect, he returned to Europe but during a holiday trip to Tenerife suffered a fall that severely damaged his right knee, alongside a broken jaw, facial injuries and a head injury that put him in a coma for ten days.

Unable to resume a professional career, he played for English clubs Stanway Rovers, Hendon, Harwich & Parkeston, A.F.C. Sudbury, Mildenhall Town, Haverhill Rovers, Tiptree United, Ipswich Wanderers, Halstead Town, and Heybridge Swifts before retiring in 2011. He now works as a postman.
