= P. J. Roberts =

Australian soccer player (born 1973)

PJ Roberts
Personal information
- Full name: Paul James Roberts
- Date of birth: 19 December 1973 (age 52)
- Place of birth: Australia
- Position: Midfielder

Senior career*
Years	Team	Apps	(Gls)
1992–1993	Canberra Croatia	3	(0)
1998–2000	Canberra Cosmos	37	(1)
2000–2001	Perth Glory	8	(0)
2001–2002	Sarawak		
2003	Geylang International		
- * Club domestic league appearances and goals

Paul James Roberts (born 19 December 1973) is an Australian former soccer player who played as a midfielder.

== Early life ==
Roberts was born in 1973 in Australia. He grew up in Canberra, Australia.

== Career ==
Roberts started his career with Australian side Canberra Croatia. In 1998, he signed for Australian side Canberra Cosmos. In 2000, he signed for Australian side Perth Glory. In 2001, he signed for Malaysian side Sarawak. In 2003, he signed for Singaporean side Geylang International. He helped the club achieve second at the 2003 Singapore Cup.

== Style of play ==
Roberts mainly operated as a midfielder. He was described as "unflinching, aggressive, no nonsense, no mess".

== Personal life ==
After retiring from professional football, Roberts lived in Singapore. He has worked as a television football analyst. He has suffered from testicular cancer.
