= Anucha Chuaysri =

Thai footballer (born 1979)

Personal information
- Full name: Anucha Chuaysri
- Date of birth: April 9, 1979 (age 47)
- Place of birth: Ratchaburi, Thailand
- Height: 1.68 m (5 ft 6 in)
- Positions: Winger; striker

Youth career
- 1998–2000: Krung Thai Bank

Senior career*
Years	Team	Apps	(Gls)
2002	Home United	8	(1)
2002–2004	Air Force United F.C.		
2005	PS Mojokerto Putra		
2006–2007	TTM FC		
2008	Phnom Penh Empire		
2008	Nakhon Pathom		
2009	TTM FC		
2010	Chiangrai United	9	(1)
2010	Chanthaburi	16	(2)
2011–2014	BBCU	29	(6)
2014	Paknampho NSRU	8	(0)

International career
2002	Thailand	5	(0)
- * Club domestic league appearances and goals as of 14 November 2008

Anucha Chuaysri is a former professional football player from Thailand.
