= Aleksandar Ranković (footballer) =

Serbian footballer and manager

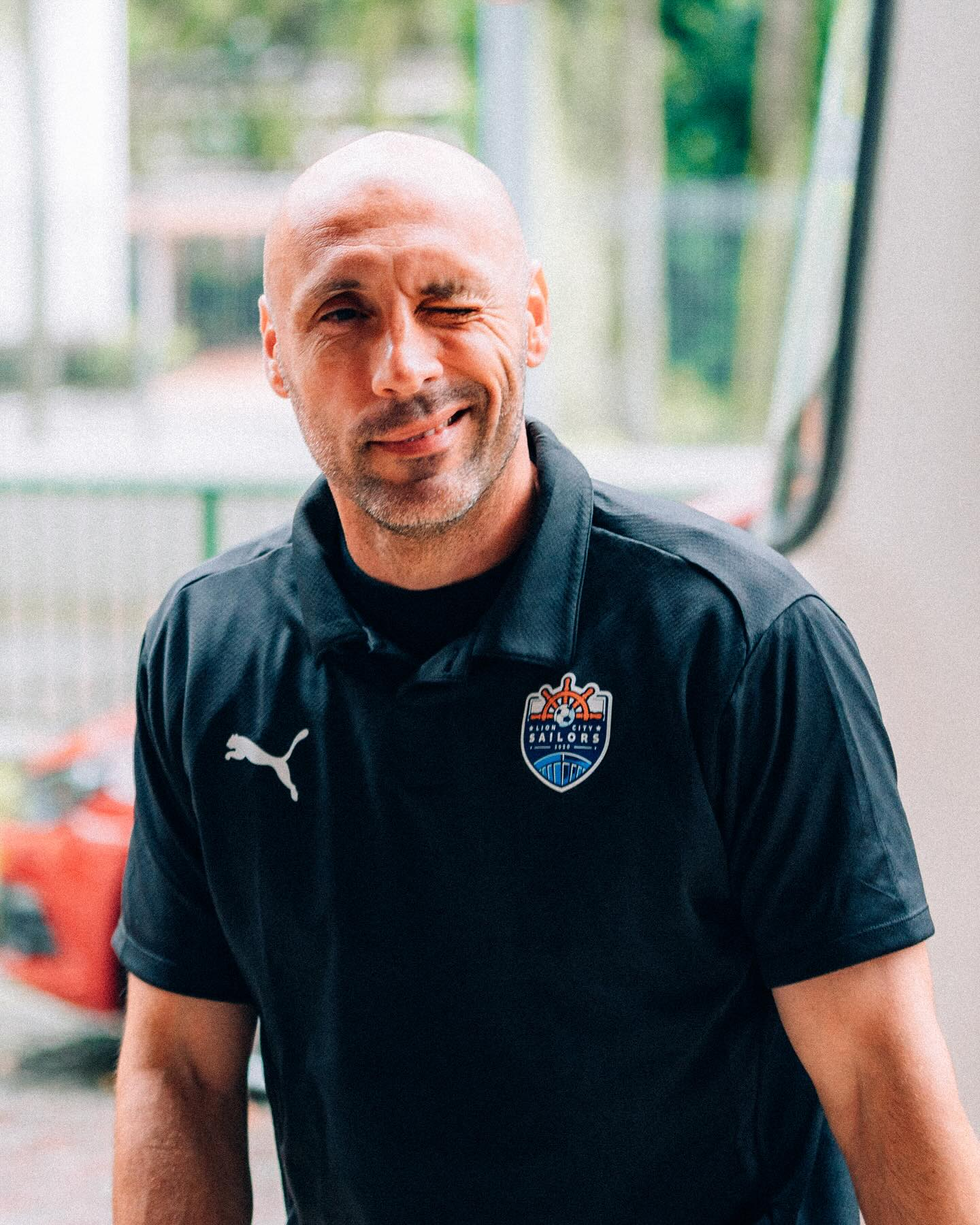
- Ranković with Lion City Sailors in 2024

Personal information
- Full name: Aleksandar Ranković
- Date of birth: 31 August 1978 (age 48)
- Place of birth: Belgrade, SR Serbia, Yugoslavia
- Height: 1.73 m (5 ft 8 in)
- Position: Defensive midfielder

Senior career*
Years	Team	Apps	(Gls)
1997–2002	Rad	101	(7)
2002–2005	Vitesse	72	(4)
2005–2011	ADO Den Haag	104	(6)
2011	Partizan	1	(0)
Total		278	(17)

Managerial career
- 2012–2013: ADO Den Haag U17
- 2013–2014: ADO Den Haag (youth coach)
- 2014–2017: ADO Den Haag U19
- 2017–2018: Vitesse (assistant)
- 2018–2020: Sparta Rotterdam (assistant)
- 2020: ADO Den Haag
- 2021–2022: Sparta Rotterdam (assistant)
- 2022–2023: Utrecht (assistant)
- 2023–2026: Lion City Sailors
- * Club domestic league appearances and goals

Aleksandar Ranković (Serbian Cyrillic: Александар Ранковић; born 31 August 1978) is a Serbian–Dutch football manager and former player. He is former head coach of Singapore Premier League club Lion City Sailors. As a player, Ranković played the entirety of his professional career in the Netherlands and his native Serbia.

== Club career ==
Ranković started his professional career with FK Rad, making his first appearances in 1997, at the age of 19. In 2002, Dutch side SBV Vitesse showed interest for the player and brought him into the Eredivisie, where he played as a first team regular for three seasons. In 2005, he moved to fellow Eredivisie participants ADO Den Haag where he became one of their key players.

Ranković hit the news in January 2007, when he was sent off in a 3–1 defeat to AZ, match in which he also scored a goal. The incident took place after the referee Kevin Blom awarded a penalty to AZ, and Ranković pushed Blom whilst shouting "When I see you in the city, I'll kill you". Ranković received a five match ban for the death threats. He later apologized for the incident.

On 22 June 2011, Ranković signed a one-year deal with FK Partizan.

== Managerial career ==
=== ADO Den Haag ===
On 15 May 2020, Ranković was announced as the new head coach of ADO Den Haag until 2022.

=== Utrecht ===
On 30 June 2022, Ranković joined Utrecht as an assistant coach under Henk Fraser.

=== Lion City Sailors ===
On 28 June 2023, Ranković signed a two years contract with Singaporean side, Lion City Sailors as their head coach. In his first ever game in charge on 1 July 2023, he guide the team to a 1–7 away win against Tanjong Pagar United. Ranković also guided the club in the 2023–24 AFC Champions League group stage winning against Hong Kong giants, Kitchee 2–1 and Korean giants, Jeonbuk Hyundai Motors 2–0. In his first season at the club, he steered the team to win the 2023 Singapore Cup.

On 4 May 2024, Ranković steered his club to lift the 2024 Singapore Community Shield in a 2–0 win over Albirex Niigata (S). During the 2024–25 AFC Champions League Two season, Ranković managed to guide the Lion City Sailors to the round of 16 as group leaders making them the first ever Singaporean Club to do so. He made history with the club after guiding them to the quarter-finals of the 2024–25 AFC Champions League Two after defeating Thailand side Muangthong United 7–2 on aggregate in the round of 16. Ranković then guided the team all the way to the AFC Champions League Two final but lost to Emirati club Sharjah 2–1. However, he guided Lion City Sailors to a domestic double after winning the 2024–25 league title and the 2024–25 Singapore Cup.

On 7 July 2025, Ranković sign a two-years contract extension with the club.

On 6 February 2026, Lion City Sailors have parted ways with Ranković with immediate effect.

== Managerial statistics ==
As of 6 February 2026

Managerial record by team and tenure
Team	Nat.	From	To	Record								Ref.
Team	Nat.	From	To	G	W	D	L	GF	GA	GD	Win %	Ref.
ADO Den Haag	(Netherlands)	1 July 2020	8 November 2020	9	1	2	6	9	21	−12	11.11	
Lion City Sailors	(Singapore)	30 June 2023	6 February 2026	102	64	14	24	267	131	+136	62.75	
Career Total				111	65	16	30	276	152	+124	58.56	

== Honours ==
=== Manager ===
Lion City Sailors

- AFC Champions League Two runner-up: 2024–25
- Singapore Premier League: 2024–25
- Singapore Cup: 2023, 2024–25
- Singapore Community Shield: 2024

=== Individual ===
- Singapore Premier League Coach of the Year: 2024–25
