= Itimi Wilson =

Nigerian footballer

Personal information
- Full name: Itimi Wilson Owepa
- Place of birth: Lagos, Nigeria
- Position: Striker

Senior career*
Years	Team	Apps	(Gls)
2001–2003	Balestier Khalsa FC		
- * Club domestic league appearances and goals

Itimi Wilson is a Nigerian former footballer.

== Singapore ==
Plying his trade with the Prime League and senior teams of Singapore S.League club Balestier Khalsa, Wilson once tallied six goals in a Prime League game facing Jurong. However, along with Wisdom Onyekwere, the Nigerian striker was axed from their roster in 2003.

In 2001, Wilson was found to be living in a 3 x 5m storeroom with four other players, besmirching the reputation of Balestier Khalsa and the S.League.

== Personal life ==
He is the brother of Itimi Dickson.
