= Brian Bothwell =

Scottish association football player

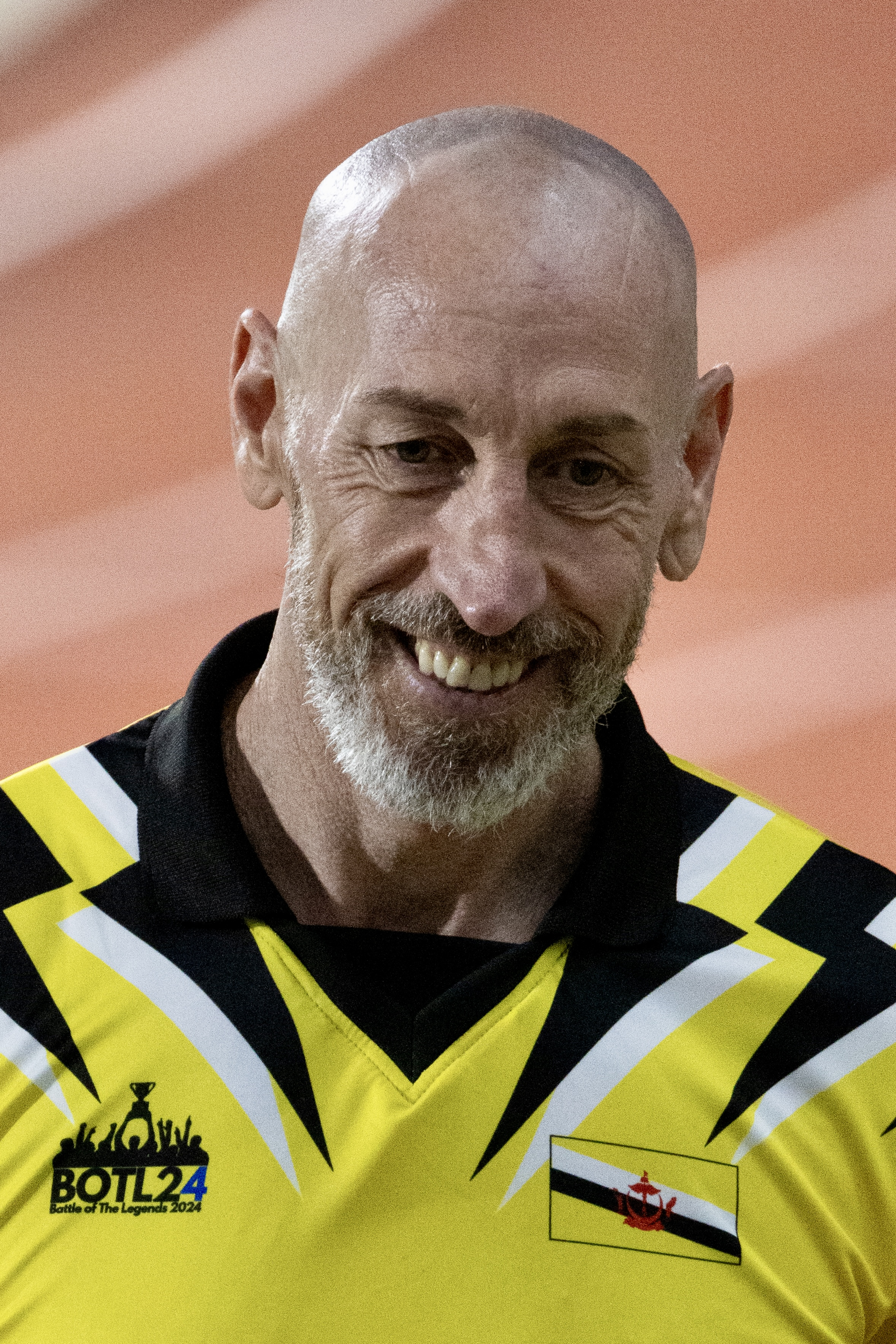
- Bothwell in 2024

Personal information
- Full name: Mohammed Brian Iman Abdullah Bothwell
- Date of birth: 24 November 1970 (age 55)
- Place of birth: Glasgow, Scotland
- Position: Forward

Youth career
- Sheffield United

Senior career*
Years	Team	Apps	(Gls)
1993	Fawkner	29	(9)
1993–1994	Morwell Falcons	21	(3)
1994	Fawkner Blues	11	(4)
1994–1995	Morwell Falcons	20	(8)
1995	Brunei		(15)
1995–1996	Morwell Falcons	27	(5)
1996	Fawkner Blues	7	(0)
1997–1999	Brunei		(33)
2000–2002	Geylang United	69+	(36+)
2003	DPMM		
2003–2004	Brunei		(19)
2005–2006	AH United		(4)

Managerial career
- Geylang U18
- * Club domestic league appearances and goals as of 21 April 2023

Mohammed Brian Iman Abdullah Bothwell (born 24 November 1970) is a Scottish-born Australian former professional footballer most known for leading Brunei FA to their first Malaysian Cup title in 1999. He also won the Singaporean S.League with Geylang in 2001.

== Career ==
=== Australia ===
Bothwell was a former trainee at Sheffield United before going back to Australia, starting out with Victoria Premier League side Fawkner in 1993. His nine goals in 29 matches helped Fawkner to finish as runners-up in the league. He was snapped up by Morwell Falcons for the 1993–94 season of the Australian top flight and managed 21 appearances.

A return to the renamed Fawkner Blues in the off season beckoned, before he spent his best performing campaign in Gippsland with eight goals for the 1994–95 season, lifting the Falcons to fourth spot. In the only season where the Morwell Falcons made the NSL finals, Bothwell was named as the club's Player of the Year.

In 2003, the Football Association of Malaysia ratified a policy which stated that foreign players must ply their trade elsewhere for two years before they can return to Malaysia. Despite this, they still allowed Bothwell to play for Brunei at the time without playing abroad for two years.

=== Geylang ===
While lining up for Geylang from 2000 to 2002, the Australian was accused of match-fixing along with footballers William Bone, Max Nicholson and Lutz Pfannenstiel. He was released on a 5775 pound bail after being catechized by the police regarding the incident. Brian was cleared of any involvement in match fixing and went on to win the league title the following season.

Retiring in 2006, the former footballer opted to become a coach, getting his AFC B License and AFC Level 1 Goalkeeping license. He last coached Geylang's Under-18 side.

== Personal life ==
In order to marry Malaysian Salwani Abdul Rahman Sahib, Bothwell converted to Islam. Their wedding was broadcast live on television. Later, he married a Singaporean.

As a child, he was a supporter of Scottish club Celtic.

During his time in Australia, Bothwell lived with his parents Margaret and Brian who moved there as well.

== Honours ==
Brunei

- Malaysia Cup: 1999

Geylang United

- S.League: 2001

Individual

- Meritorious Service Medal (PJK; 13 December 1999)
