= Fahrudin Aličković =

Serbian footballer

Personal information
- Date of birth: 19 July 1976 (age 50)
- Place of birth: Novi Pazar, SFR Yugoslavia
- Height: 1.86 m (6 ft 1 in)
- Position: Defender

Youth career
- 1984–1999: Novi Pazar
- 1999–2000: Dinamo Pančevo
- 2000–2001: Remont Canepak Čačak

Senior career*
Years	Team	Apps	(Gls)
2001–2002	Novi Pazar		
2002–2003	Tampines Rovers		
2003–2004	Košice		
2003	→ Humenné (loan)		
2004–2005	CFR Cluj	11	(0)
2009–2011	Košice-Barca		
2011	Turany		
Total		11+	(0+)
- * Club domestic league appearances and goals

Fahrudin Aličković (Serbian Cyrillic: Фахрудин Аличковић; born 19 July 1976) is a Serbian retired footballer who played as a defender or a defensive midfielder.

Playing as a defender, he played in Yugoslavia, Singapore, Slovakia and Romania.

== Club career ==
Aličković played in a 4–1 loss against Rapid Bratislava. In 2003 he joined Humenné. Aličković scored the winning goal for Humenné in a 2–0 win over Topolčany.
