= Hiroaki Tanaka =

Japanese footballer (born 1979)

Hiroaki Tanaka 田中 洋明
Personal information
- Full name: Hiroaki Tanaka
- Date of birth: April 17, 1979 (age 47)
- Place of birth: Tokyo, Japan
- Height: 1.75 m (5 ft 9 in)
- Position: Forward

Youth career
- 1995–1997: Verdy Kawasaki
- 2000–2001: Kokushikan University

Senior career*
Years	Team	Apps	(Gls)
1998–1999	Verdy Kawasaki	0	(0)
1999	Yokohama FC		
2002	Home United		
2003	Tanjong Pagar United	?	(9)
2003–2004	Osotspa		
2004–2005	Waitakere United		

International career
1995	Japan U-17	2	(0)
Medal record
Representing Japan
AFC U-16 Championship
Gold medal – first place	1994 Qatar
- * Club domestic league appearances and goals

Hiroaki Tanaka (田中 洋明, Tanaka Hiroaki; born April 17, 1979) is a former Japanese football player.

== Club career ==
Tanaka was born in Tokyo on April 17, 1979. After playing on a youth team, he joined J1 League club Verdy Kawasaki in 1998. In the same year, he also entered Kokushikan University. In July 1999, he moved to Yokohama FC. In 2000, he joined the Kokushikan University team. After graduating from the university in 2002, he played for S.League club Home United (2002), Tanjong Pagar United (2003). Thai League 1 club Osotspa (2003–04) and New Zealand Football Championship club Waitakere United (2004–05).

== National team career ==
In August 1995, Tanaka was selected for the Japan U-17 national team for 1995 U-17 World Championship. He played 2 matches in the tournament.
