= Nebojsa Vukosavljevic =

Australian soccer player

Personal information
- Date of birth: 4 May 1978
- Place of birth: SFR Yugoslavia
- Height: 1.88 m (6 ft 2 in)
- Position: Striker

Youth career
- R.S.C. Anderlecht

Senior career*
Years	Team	Apps	(Gls)
1997–2001	Port Melbourne SC		
2001–2002	Geylang United		
2002-2005	Springvale White Eagles FC		
2006–2010	Noble Park United FC		

Managerial career
- 2019-2020: Springvale White Eagles FC
- * Club domestic league appearances and goals

Nebojsa Vukosavljevic (born 4 May 1978 in SFR Yugoslavia) is an Australian former soccer player who is last known to have played for Noble Park United.

== Singapore ==
Moving to Geylang United of the Singaporean S.League for the 2002 season, Vukosavljevic originally struggled to find the net, mustering two goals in 11 appearances, generally performing under pressure. Suddenly, he found his form in the middle of the year, hauling 6 goals from 5 games, including a goal and an assist in a 3–0 victory over Balestier.

== Personal life ==
After the disintegration of Yugoslavia, he got Australian citizenship.
