= Itimi Dickson =

Singaporean footballer

Personal information
- Full name: Itimi Dickson Edherefe
- Date of birth: 14 November 1983 (age 42)
- Place of birth: Lagos, Nigeria
- Height: 1.70 m (5 ft 7 in)
- Positions: Midfielder; striker

Senior career*
Years	Team	Apps	(Gls)
2001	Jurong	26	(9)
2002–2003	Woodlands Wellington	49	(23)
2004–2005	Young Lions	51	(15)
2006	Woodlands Wellington	26	(3)
2007–2009	Persitara Jakarta Utara	17	(2)
2009	Home United	24	(1)
2010	Geylang United	30	(1)
2011–2012	Persidafon Dafonsoro	10	(0)

International career^{‡}
2004–2009	Singapore	33	(4)
- * Club domestic league appearances and goals ‡ National team caps and goals as of 25 December 2010

Itimi Dickson Edherefe is a former professional football player. Born in Nigeria, he represented the Singapore national team.

== Club career ==
Previously, Dickson played for Jurong FC, Woodlands Wellington FC, Young Lions and Persitara Jakarta Utara.

In 2001, Dickson was suspended for three months and fined S$1,000 for punching Home United's Harun Juma'at. He fell out with head coach V. Sundramoorthy after serving out his ban and was transferred to Woodlands Wellington in 2002.

Dickson returned to S-league to play for Home United after an unsuccessful season with Persitara Jakarta Utara. The final club he played was for Persidafon Dafonsoro.

After his retirement in 2012, Dickson joined the coaching staff at the private league ESPZEN.

== International career ==
Fast and aggressive in attack, Dickson provides width and decent flair to a Singapore national side midfield that lacks technical capability.

Although he was born in Nigeria, Dickson received Singapore citizenship under the Foreign Sports Talent Scheme in 2004. He was on the Singapore squad that won the Tiger Cup regional football championship in 2004.

Dickson was given a 6-month ban from representing Singapore when he was absent from training with the national team in 2007. He later bounced back from the ban by playing well in league and was subsequently made part of the AFF Championship winning side.

== National team career statistics ==
=== Goals for Senior National Team ===
#	Date	Venue	Opponent	Score	Result	Competition
	15 December 2004	Hanoi, Vietnam	Cambodia	3–0	Won	2004 Tiger Cup
	15 January 2007	Singapore, Singapore	Laos	11–0	Won	2007 ASEAN Football Championship

== Honours ==
Singapore

- ASEAN Football Championship: 2004, 2007
