= Wisdom Onyekwere =

Nigerian footballer

Personal information
- Full name: Wisdom Chibuike Onyekwere
- Date of birth: 8 October 1981 (age 44)
- Place of birth: Lagos, Nigeria
- Position: Forward

Senior career*
Years	Team	Apps	(Gls)
2000–2003	Balestier Khalsa		
2003–2004	Național București	1	(0)
- * Club domestic league appearances and goals

Wisdom Chibuike Onyekwere is a Nigerian former professional footballer who played as a forward for Singaporean club Balestier Khalsa and Romanian side Național București.

== Career ==
Playing for Baletsier Khalsa of the Singapore S.League in 2002, Onyekwere formed a striker partnership with fellow Nigerian Itimi Wilson for the 2003 season; however, he and Itimi were sacked from the club by June that year, with him enjoining the Football Association of Singapore's Player Status Committee over three months' salary.

He was attached to Național București of the Romanian Liga I in the 2003–04 season.
