= Jurong FC =

Singaporean football club

Jurong
- Full name: Jurong (Town) Football Club
- Nickname: The Cobras
- Founded: 1975; 51 years ago as Jurong Town; 1997; 29 years ago as Jurong FC
- Dissolved: 2003; 23 years ago
- Ground: Jurong Stadium
- Capacity: 8,000
- League: S.League
- 2003: S.League, 6th of 12
Home colours	Away colours

Jurong (Town) Football Club was a professional football club based in Jurong, Singapore. The club played in the S.League, the top division of football in Singapore from 1997 to 2003. Their best league finishes were fifth place in both 1998 and 2001.

The club was founded as Jurong Town Football Club in 1975, and prior to 1997 revamp, they were known as Jurong Football Club. The team won Singapore's President's Cup (now known as the Singapore Cup) in 1988 and 1989, and were runners-up in 1999 and 2002.

== History ==
=== Pre S.League Era ===
The purpose of forming the club was to serve employees and residents in the Jurong Industrial estate. In 1975, the club organised the Jurong League which attracted a large number of workers. The club was given the Division One status. It was coached by the well known footballer of the 1960s, the late Rahim Omar. He coached the club for two years, after which it was relegated to Division Two till 1987. In 1988, Jurong Town was back in the top division and sponsored by Japan Airlines, the first company to come into a domestic competition with $100,000 sponsorship. This sponsorship helped the club to engage players like V. Sundramoorthy, Jeffrey Lazaroo, A.R.J. Mani, K Kannan, D. Tokijan and Lim Chiew Peng. Nazri Nasir and Lim Tong Hai who joined at the age of 16. Jurong Town won the President's Cup in that year and D. Tokijan was awarded the top scorer for the year. Jurong Town signed David Lee at the end of the 1988 season. In the late 1980s and early 1990s, their kits were sponsored by Hummel.

In 1990, the club signed Australians Tommy Marras and Peter Murphy. They finished second in the Premier League with goal difference to Geylang United. In 1991, Jurong Town was relegated to the Second Division. In 1992, the club was promoted again. In 1996, after relegations in the past three years, K Suppiah wanted to help Jurong Town. He engaged Jimmy Pearson to be the coach and M. Somasamy as a team manager.

=== 1997–1999: Instability ===
1997 saw the former NFL side Jurong Town renamed themselves as Jurong FC and adopt a scorpion as their mascot. Jurong FC finished seventh out of nine teams in their first top domestic season. The club's notable achievements were ending Geylang United's unbeaten run and Alan McTurk scoring the fastest goal of the season. In 1999, Jurong FC star player, V Sundramoorthy, was appointed the coach. He became the first ever player-coach in the S.League history. Jurong finished in sixth position. That year they have also reached the final of the Singapore Cup. The club's captain, Jason Ainsley, was the top scorer with 19 goals; he was the third top scorer overall for that season. Jurong FC's main sponsor WSA Lines ended their sponsorship. Dalis Supait was recalled back to the national team after superb performances.

=== 2003: Pulling out from the S-League ===
Finally in 2003, Jurong FC's financial problems forced the club to pull out from the S-League indefinitely, much to the dismay of its fans and supporters.

== Club image ==
In 1997, Jurong Reptile Park sponsored the club in a 1 million deal and Jurong FC set up its first clubhouse at the park. The club also asked its fans to select a new mascot to associate with the new sponsor, and the winner was cobra.

== Stadium ==
The club's original home ground was based at the old Jurong Stadium from 1975 until 1997. During the construction of the new Jurong East Stadium, Jurong FC used Bukit Gombak Stadium as their home ground for the 1997 S.League season.

== Sponsors ==
Period	Kit supplier	Main sponsor
1980–1990	(Denmark) Hummel	Japan Airlines
1997	(Japan) Mikasa	WSA Lines
2000	(Japan) Mikasa	(Japan) Maxell

== Coaching history ==
Coach	Period	Achievements
(Scotland) Jimmy Pearson	1996–1998	
(Singapore) Ramasamy Krishnan	1998 (interim)	
(Singapore) V Sundramoorthy	1999 – 2003	1999, 2002 Singapore Cup runner-up

== Seasons ==
Season	Pos	P	W	D	L	F	A	Pts	Singapore Cup
1997	7th	16	4	3	9	15	33	15	Preliminary
1998	5th	20	9	4	7	32	33	31	Preliminary
1999	6th	22	9	4	9	37	32	31	Runners-up
2000	6th	22	8	5	9	30	37	29	Preliminary
2001	5th	33	15	6	12	65	57	51	Preliminary
2002	7th	33	13	6	14	47	48	45	Runners-up
2003	6th	33	12	7–1	13	35	34	51	Third place

- 2003 saw the introduction of penalty shoot-outs if a match ended in a draw in regular time. Winners of penalty shoot-outs gained two points instead of one.

== Honours ==
=== Cup ===
- President's Cup
  - Champions (2): 1988, 1989
