= Emmanuel Unaka =

Nigerian footballer

Personal information
- Place of birth: Nigeria
- Position: Defender

Senior career*
Years	Team	Apps	(Gls)
2000–2002	Clementi Khalsa		
- * Club domestic league appearances and goals

Emmanuel Unaka is a Nigerian former footballer who is last known to have plied his trade with Clementi Khalsa of the Singaporean S.League in 2001.

== Singapore ==
For uttering racial pejoratives at each other during a game, Unaka and Singaporean striker Toh Choon Ming were brought before the S.League Disciplinary Committee in August 2001, each getting a four-match ban and a 29,000 Singaporean dollars fine.
