= Lion City Sailors FC =

Association football club in Singapore

Lion City Sailors
- Full name: Lion City Sailors Football Club
- Nickname: The Sailors
- Short name: LCS
- Founded: 1945; 81 years ago as Police SA; 1997; 29 years ago as Home United; February 14, 2020; 6 years ago as Lion City Sailors
- Ground: Bishan Stadium; Jalan Besar Stadium
- Capacity: 6,000; 6,500
- Owner: Sea Limited
- Chairman: Forrest Li
- Head coach: Mark Jackson
- League: Singapore Premier League
- 2025–26: 1st of 8 (champions)
- Website: www.lioncitysailorsfc.sg
Home colours	Away colours

Lion City Sailors Football Club, commonly referred to as the Sailors or LCS, is a Singaporean professional football club based in Bishan. It competes in the Singapore Premier League, the top tier of the Singapore football league system. Founded in 1945 as the Police Sports Association, the club renamed itself to Police FC in the inaugural 1996 S.League season, before rebranding once more as Home United in 1997. In 2020, it became first club in Singapore to be privatised under its current name.

It was the first privatised football club in the country. Owned by Forrest Li's Sea Limited, which is also a major local tech conglomerate, the club in its own vision aims to elevate the standards of football in Singapore and establish itself as an international powerhouse. The club has signed several high-profile local and foreign players, breaking the league's transfer record numerous times in the process, together with owning its own training facility at MacPherson, and focusing on youth development. The club have won 5 league titles, a record 9 Singapore Cups and 4 Community Shields in their history.

== History ==
The Police Sports Association was founded in 1945 to organize football activities for the Singapore Police Force. It sent two teams to compete in the Singapore Amateur Football Association League in the 1950s and 1960s, but neither team won any trophies. Under coach Choo Seng Quee, the club won the inaugural President's Cup in 1968, then reached and lost the next two finals.

In 1985, Police SA won the National Football League.

=== Home United (1997–2019) ===
When the S.League was formed in 1996, the club was known as the Police Football Club. The following year, its name was changed to Home United to reflect the fact that the team represented not only the Singapore Police Force, but also other HomeTeam departments of the Singapore Ministry of Home Affairs such as the Singapore Civil Defence Force and the Immigration and Checkpoints Authority. Home United nickname was the "Protectors" and its mascot, a dragon.

In 1999, Dutch head coach Robert Alberts guided the club to secured their first ever piece of silverware guiding them to win the 1999 S.League title. Alberts also won the Singapore Cup back-to-back winning the 2000 and 2001 edition.

In 2003, English head coach Steve Darby guided Home United in becoming the first club to achieve the S.League and Singapore Cup double where he also steer the club to won the 2005 edition of the Singapore Cup. Under Korean manager tutelage, Lee Lim-saeng who is also the longest tenure as head coach in the club history, guided Home United to win both the 2011 Singapore Cup and the 2013 Singapore Cup in his four years at the club. In 2010, Home United hosted EFL Championship club Burnley as part of their pre-season trip to Singapore.

The club had qualified to the AFC Cup for the tenth time with their best result in the 2004 AFC Cup where they reached the semi-final losing to Syrian club, Al-Jaish 6–1 on aggregate. In the 2018 AFC Cup group stage, Home United was drawn with Philippines side Ceres–Negros, Cambodia side Boeung Ket Angkor and Myanmar side Shan United with a tally of four wins, one draw and one loss seeing the Protectors qualifying to the AFC Cup knockout stage as group winners. Home United would go on to face Indonesian club, Persija Jakarta winning the two legged tie in a 6–3 aggregate where they would advanced to the zonal finals facing Ceres–Negros and eventually won 3–1 on aggregate against the Philippines side. Home United then qualified to the inter-zone play-off semi-finals of the AFC Cup facing North Korea side, April 25 where during the second leg of the tie, Home United suffered their worst ever defeat in the club history losing 9–1 at the Kim Il Sung Stadium.

=== Lion City Sailors (2020–present) ===
On 14 February 2020, the club was privatised for the first time in its history. The club was officially renamed as Lion City Sailors and its signature red colour was replaced with white and blue. The new name, Sailors, was a homage to the country's maritime heritage. Lion City Sailors were led by Aurelio Vidmar, the former Socceroos captain, from 2020. He joined after a hugely successful stint with Adelaide United, reaching the 2008 AFC Champions League final. Vidmar made a couple of stud signings including Singaporean stars Hassan Sunny, Gabriel Quak and Shahdan Sulaiman, Japanese defender Kaishu Yamazaki, as well a prolific Australian striker, Andy Pengelly.

On 21 January 2021, the club created history by smashing the Singapore Premier League transfer record with the signing of midfielder Diego Lopes from Portuguese top-flight side Rio Ave for €1.8 million on a three-year deal.

==== Kim Do-hoon era ====

2021 Singapore Premier League title winning squad

With the motivation to rejuvenate the glory days, On 18 May 2021 Kim Do-hoon who led Korea Republic's Ulsan Hyundai to victory in 2020 AFC Champions League joined the Sailors on a two-and-a-half-year deal. During his first season, Kim led the Sailors to win the 2021 Singapore Premier League and the 2022 Singapore Community Shield. They also went on to qualify for their first ever AFC Champions League tournament. On 18 April 2022, the Sailors defeated the K League 1 club Daegu FC 3–0 in the 2022 AFC Champions League, their first AFC Champions League win since rebranding. They bounced back from an opening 4–1 defeat by the J1 League club Urawa Red Diamonds, before picking up four points in a goalless draw and 3–2 win over the Chinese Super League's Shandong Taishan. Sailors maiden AFC Champions League campaign ended with narrow 2–1 to Daegu in the final group stage fixture. Their tally of seven points is the best showing by a Singaporean side at the AFC Champions League.

In the 2022 Singapore Premier League match against Tampines Rovers on 24 July 2022, as the Sailors was contesting in a draw nearing to the end of the match, around the 87th minute of the match, with the score levelled at 1–1, things became heated as Tampines forward Boris Kopitović confronted Sailors defender Nur Adam Abdullah near the sideline. Other players, as well as coaches and staff from both sides got involved in the tussle. Kim Do-hoon appeared to get involved in a heated argument with Tampines assistant Fahrudin Mustafić. Pedro Henrique went on to score a header in the injury time to secure the three points for the Sailors. The Football Association of Singapore handed a three-match ban with immediate effect, with Kim being fined $2,000 and Fahrudin $3,000, for their violent conduct. In addition, both Sailors and Tampines were fined $5,000. Less than 24 hours after Kim was handed a three-match suspension and fine for violent conduct, Lion City Sailors made the shocking announcement of a "mutual agreement" to part ways with the Korean coach.

On 12 August 2022, Luka Lalić was appointed as the interim coach till the end of the 2022 season. The following day, he guided Lion City Sailors to their biggest ever victory, 1–10 away against Young Lions.

==== Aleksandar Ranković era ====
On 28 June 2023, the Sailors recruited Aleksandar Ranković on a two years contract. In his first match in charge, Ranković guided the team to a 7–1 away win against Tanjong Pagar United in the 2023 Singapore Premier League. On 26 July 2023, they played exhibition match at the Singapore National Stadium against Tottenham Hotspur, in which Shawal Anuar scored first. However, they ultimately lost 1–5 following poor defensive errors in the second half.

The Sailors embarked on their 2023–24 campaign with Jeonbuk Hyundai Motors, Bangkok United and Kitchee. The club hosted most of the AFC Champions League group stage games at the Jalan Besar Stadium as its matched the requirement standards. On 4 October 2023, Lion City Sailors recorded their first win against Hong Kong side Kitchee with goals scored by Richairo Živković and Maxime Lestienne for a 2–1 away victory at the Hong Kong Stadium.

On 8 November 2023, the Sailors defeated two-time AFC Champions League winners Jeonbuk Hyundai Motors 2–0, with Živković scoring both goals. They then won the 2023 Singapore Cup over defending champions Hougang United on 9 December.

For the 2024–25 Singapore Premier League season, Sailors made additions to their squad. On 26 February 2024, they signed Bart Ramselaar from Utrecht, the second most expensive signing in the league's history for a reported fee of €1.5 million (SGD$2.2 million). Lion City Sailors also signed Toni Datković from Spanish Segunda División side Albacete. On 7 March 2024, the Sailors announced the return of Song Ui-young since he left the club in 2023. On 4 May 2024, they won their third Singapore Community Shield after beating Albirex Niigata (S) 2–0, with Shawal Anuar and Maxime Lestienne scoring to secure the win. The Sailors also competed in both the inaugural 2024–25 AFC Champions League Two and the revived 2024–25 ASEAN Club Championship tournament.

===== AFC Champions League Two runners-up and domestic double =====

2025 AFC Champions League Two final line-up. The squad also went on to win a domestic double in 2025.

With a losing streak in the ASEAN Club Championship, the Sailors turned their main focus on the inaugural AFC Champions League Two campaign, hosting Chinese club Zhejiang Professional in September. Club captain Hariss Harun broke the dreadlock in the 44th minute by scoring a volley from outside the box. In the 80th minute, Lestienne secured a 2–0 win with a skillful chip shot. In the next match against Indonesian side Persib Bandung at the Si Jalak Harupat Stadium on 24 October, both teams contested in a 1–1 draw after Maxime Lestienne delivered a cross towards Bailey Wright who scored a header to equalise for the Sailors. In the third fixture against Port at the Pathum Thani Stadium, Shawal Anuar scored a brace in the 14th and 17th minute. Later on, Song Ui-young scored to secure a 3–1 away win which put the Sailors at the top of the table. After two disappointing results which saw the opponents back from a two goal deficit, the Sailors needed to win in the final fixture to qualify for the knockout stage.

At home game against Port on 5 December, Song Ui-young scored a hat-trick which secured a 5–2 win, seeing Lion City Sailors qualifying to the round of 16 as group winners. During the round of 16 match against Muangthong United on 18 February 2025, Shawal Anuar set a record for the fastest goal in the competition history (18 seconds, beating the previous record of 26 seconds by Musa Barrow). The Sailors went on to grab a 3–2 win. In the reverse fixture on 20 February, the team went on to beat Muangthong United 4–0, which saw Lion City Sailors advance to the quarter-finals. In the quarter-final first leg against J1 League club Sanfreece Hiroshima, Lion City Sailors were heavily defeated 6–1 at the Edion Peace Wing Hiroshima. However, they were awarded a 3–0 win due to the Japanese side fielding an ineligible player. In the home fixture, Lennart Thy opened up the account for the hosts in the 20th minute, before Sanfrece scored in the 34th minute. The game ended up as a draw, with the aggregate score of 4–1 for Lion City Sailors. Therefore, against all odds, they qualified to the semi-finals, facing Australian club Sydney FC. Lion City Sailors managed to defeat Sydney FC with a 2–1 aggregate score, thus booking their spot in the first ever rebranded 2025 AFC Champions League Two final, becoming the first football team from Singapore to reach the final of the continental competition. They lost the final to Emirati club Sharjah by 1–2. In the next match, Lion City Sailors won the league title in the season final fixture against Tampines Rovers, whereas against the same opponent in the 2024–25 Singapore Cup final, a goal from Bart Ramselaar sealed a domestic double.

Lion City Sailors started off the 2025–26 season signing a few notable players like Anderson Lopes, Ivan Sušak, Tsiy-William Ndenge and a local football favourite, Safuwan Baharuddin. The club also announced a permanent deal of Diogo Costa after a successful loan spell with the club on a five years contract. LCS then finished in third place in the 2025–26 AFC Champions League Two group stage tying with Thailand club Bangkok United with 10 points but bowed out from the cup due to head-to-head record. While in the Singapore Cup, Lion City Sailors was drawn in the semi-final where they would faced off against Balestier Khalsa in December 2025. Lion City Sailors went on to advanced to the final beating them 5–1 on aggregate which also see their star player Maxime Lestienne calling an end to his professional career retiring by playing in the 2nd leg of the semi-final match. Lion City Sailors would then bring in Luka Adžić and Kyoga Nakamura from Bangkok United in the January 2026 transfer window where the club would then face against league rivals, Tampines Rovers in the Singapore Cup final on 10 January 2026 where Hami Syahin and Anderson Lopes went on to scored in extra time sealing a 2–0 win ensuring that Lion City Sailors became the first local team in Singapore football history to win three Singapore Cups in a row. FAS awarded the Sailors a 3–0 score after Tampines Rovers failed to maintained at least four Singaporean players in the team during the match resulting in a breach of quoata. On 6 February 2026, Lion City Sailors announced that they reached mutual agreement to part ways with head coach Aleksandar Ranković.

==== Jesús Casas era ====
On 23 February 2026, Lion City Sailors announced the signing of Spanish head coach Jesús Casas on a two and half year contract. He helms the club to win the 2025–26 season league title after a goalless draw against Tampines Rovers on 3 May.

Lion City Sailors started off the 2026–27 season losing star player, Anderson Lopes who went back to Japan to signed with Vissel Kobe on an undisclosed fee. With the transfer budget, the club managed to give contract extension to a few players while also signing a few notable local players like Farhan Zulkifli, Ryhan Stewart, Glenn Kweh and Ilhan Fandi. The Sailors then signed a few foreigners like Hugo Gomes, Matthias Phaëton, Jorge Karseladze, Antonio Mance, Giovanni Haag and Bobby Adekanye to strengthen the squad for the upcoming season. Lion City Sailors then went to Spain for a 9 days pre-season stints in Cádiz and Málaga before returning home to prepare for the new season. However, on 1 September 2026, head coach Jesús Casas was sacked just five days before the club’s season curtain-raiser against Tampines Rovers. The club chief analyst Varo Moreno, than takeover as the caretaker coach where he guided Lion City Sailors to a 2–0 win over Tampines Rovers in the 2026 Singapore Community Shield.

==== Mark Jackson era ====
On 9 September 2026, Lion City Sailors recruited English head coach Mark Jackson ahead of the 2026–27 season. Jackson has an outstanding record in Asian football where he had led both Australia’s Central Coast Mariners and Thailand’s Buriram United to historic trebles.

== Team image ==
=== Supporters ===
==== The Crew ====
The Crew is the official supporters' group of Lion City Sailors, established following the club's privatisation and rebranding in 2020. The group was formed to bring together the club's supporters and provide organised support for the team during domestic and continental competitions.

The group's support is particularly visible during matchdays, with members organising chants, songs, banners and drums to create an atmosphere inside the stadium. The Crew also travels to away matches to support the Sailors and has mobilised supporters for major fixtures. The Crew has also been involved in activities beyond match attendance, including fan-made banners, player songs and other forms of supporter-created content. The group has grown significantly since its establishment, with the club reporting strong support from its membership and continuing to develop its fan engagement programmes.

== Stadium ==
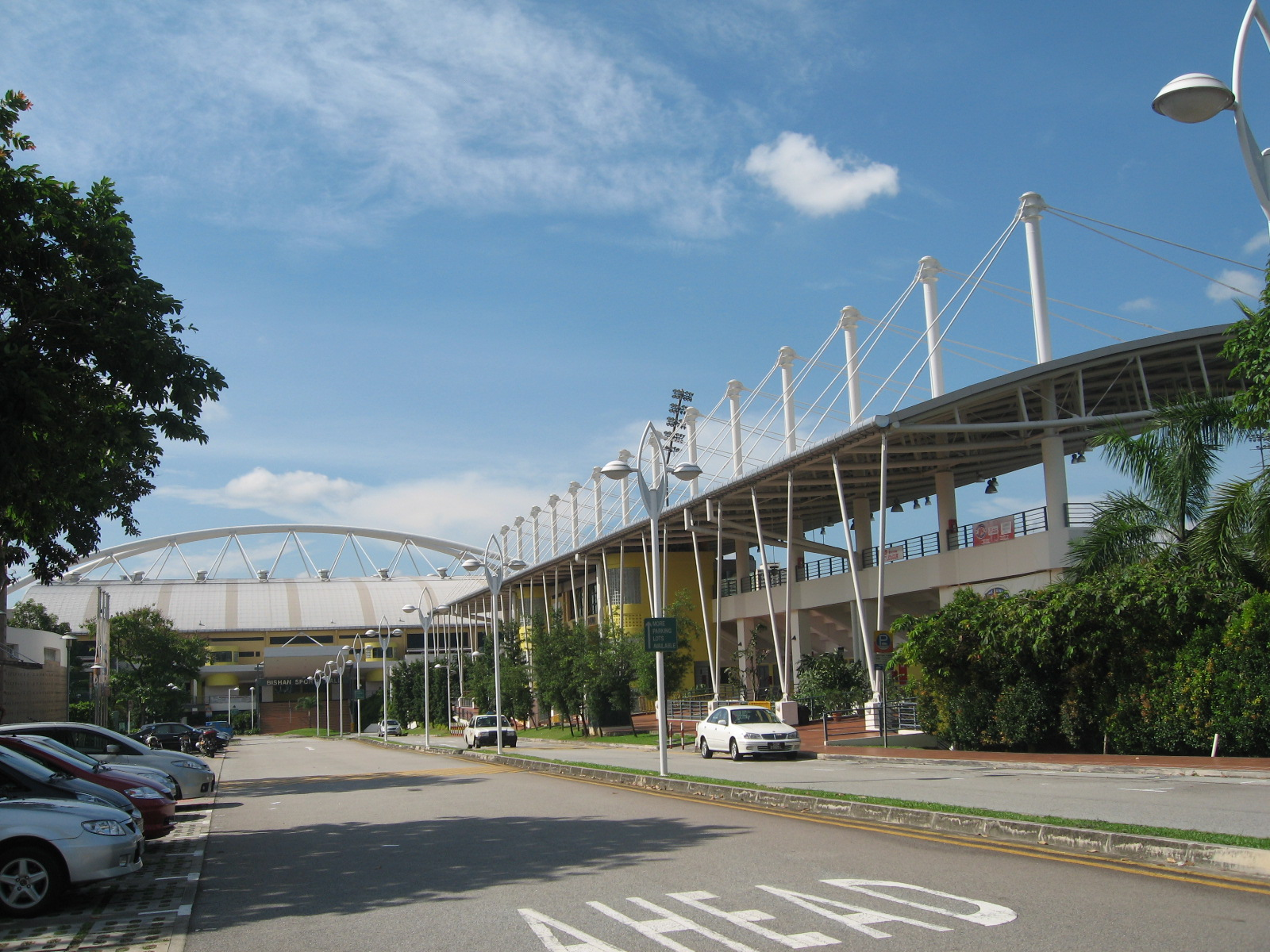
Bishan Stadium has been the home ground for the club since 1998

Bishan Stadium serves as the main home ground of Lion City Sailors with a seating capacity of 10,000. It was the home base for the club (initially known as Home United) from its inception all the way to 2020. Following the conclusion of the 2020 Singapore Premier League season, the Bishan Stadium underwent returfing, causing the club to seek a temporary move to Jalan Besar Stadium. Lion City Sailors headed back to Bishan Stadium for the 2023 Singapore Premier League season, fitted with the Video Assistant Referee (VAR) technology. However, the Sailors hosted their 2023–24 AFC Champions League home matches at the Jalan Besar Stadium, as it matched the specific requirements of the tournament.

As Lion City Sailors become the flag bearer of Singaporean football to progress all the way until the 2025 AFC Champions League Two final, the club was given the honour to host the final of the Asian Football Confederation (AFC) tournament in which the Singapore National Stadium was unavailable. Sharjah voiced their disapproval to play at Jalan Besar Stadium. AFC granted a provisional approval for Lion City Sailors to host the final at Bishan Stadium. They teamed up with Sport Singapore, FAS and key industry partners to get the stadium match-ready.

== Academy development ==
In February 2013, the club opened and operated a football academy named 'Home United Youth Football Academy' which comprises ten futsal courts, two full-size football pitches, an events plaza, staff offices, meeting rooms and a Sports Performance Centre.

Mattar Training Centre

In June 2020, the launch of the new Lion City Sailors Football Academy was announced, along with further plans on youth development and its investments. It was given a One-Star rating by the Asian Football Confederation.

On 24 April 2021, Lion City Sailors announced the construction of a new training facility along Mattar Road that will be the home to the Sailors and as well as the club academy's scholars and trainees. The facility will, when completed, become Singapore's first fully integrated football training centre.

On 29 July 2022, Lion City Sailors officially opened its new S$10 million training centre boasting the finest facilities in the football ecosystem in Singapore. Spanning 28,000 square meters, the training centre features five football pitches, one hybrid 11-a-side pitch, one artificial turf 11-a-side pitch, and three 7-a-side pitches which caters to the needs of grassroots, youth and senior team players. Besides the football pitches, the centre will also feature a fully equipped gym, physiotherapy rooms, a video analytics room, team locker rooms, a recreation room, as well as study rooms for academy trainees.

On 4 June 2024, the academy was elevated to a Two-Star academy status by the AFC where they were particularly impressed by the high level of professionalism among the managerial staff, coupled with the concerted efforts towards aligning the youth academy’s goals with the first team's objectives. LFSFA are one of only four academies in Southeast Asia to be conferred a Two-Star academy status alongside Johor Darul Ta'zim Academy, NFDP Mokhtar Dahari Academy in Malaysia and Chonburi Academy in Thailand.

In 2024, Lion City Sailors notably had several of their academy players, such as Asis Ijilrali, Jonan Tan and Khairin Nadim signing contracts with Portuguese clubs like Estrela da Amadora and Vizela.

== Kit suppliers and shirt sponsors ==
On 16 June 2025, Adidas has announced a three-year deal to become the official kit supplier for Lion City Sailors. The collaboration also included fan engagement initiatives and community programs.

Period	Kit manufacturer	Main sponsor
1996–2005	(Italy) Diadora	(Singapore) Super Coffee
2006–2008	(Italy) Diadora	(United States) Coca-Cola
2009–2014	(Italy) Kappa	(United States) Coca-Cola
2015	(Germany) Puma	(Singapore) AVEC
2016	(Germany) Puma	No sponsors
2017–2019	(Germany) Puma	(Singapore) Linco Investments
2020–2025	(Germany) Puma	(Singapore) Sea Limited (Singapore) Shopee (AFC and ASEAN Club Championship competitions only)
2025–present	(Germany) Adidas	(Singapore) Sea Limited (Singapore) Shopee (AFC and ASEAN Club Championship competitions only)

== Affiliated clubs ==
- (Netherlands) Feyenoord (2022–present)

In 2022, Lion City Sailors and 16-time Eredivisie champions, Feyenoord forged a 3-year partnership focused on youth development and education. The commitment will see a series of youth development programmes, coaching, educational and professional exchanges as well as football training camps in the Netherlands, with Sailors supporting Feyenoord's brand exposure in Singapore.

- (Vietnam) Công An Hà Nội (2025–present)

On 24 March 2025, Lion City Sailors and V. League 1 club Công An Hà Nội announced a collaboration to commemorate significant milestones in both Vietnam and Singapore in connection with the visit of Singapore Prime Minister Lawrence Wong in Hanoi. The highlight of this partnership was for both teams to play a match in 2025, bringing together two of the region’s top clubs in a celebration of friendship. This further underscored the expanding ties between Singapore and Vietnam at all levels, honoring Singapore’s 60th year of independence and Vietnam’s 80th year of independence.

=== Former ===
- (Germany) Borussia Dortmund (2021–2023)

From 2021 until 2023, Lion City Sailors and eight-time Bundesliga champions, Borussia Dortmund had a partnership focused on youth development and knowledge sharing. The commitment saw a series of youth development programmes, coaching, educational and professional exchanges as well as football training camps in Germany. This partnership was intended to harness the growing commitment to build a strong infrastructure for Singapore's youth football development and overall support the growth in areas of sports science, sports medicine, analytics and talent scouting. Both clubs also played a friendly match at the Jalan Besar Stadium on 24 November 2022.

== Players ==
=== First-team squad ===
As of 3 August 2026

Note: Flags indicate national team as defined under FIFA eligibility rules; some limited exceptions apply. Players may hold more than one non-FIFA nationality.

No.	Pos.	Nation	Player
1	GK	BRA	Victor Aznar
2	DF	GEO	Jorge Karseladze
3	DF	BRA	Hugo Gomes
4	DF	CRO	Toni Datković
5	DF	SGP	Lionel Tan
6	MF	GER	Tsiy-William Ndenge
7	FW	SGP	Shawal Anuar
8	MF	SGP	Kyoga Nakamura
9	FW	GER	Lennart Thy
10	MF	NED	Bart Ramselaar
11	FW	SGP	Glenn Kweh
12	FW	CRO	Antonio Mance
13	GK	SGP	Adib Azahari
14	MF	SGP	Hariss Harun (captain)
15	MF	SGP	Song Ui-young

No.	Pos.	Nation	Player
16	MF	SGP	Hami Syahin
17	FW	SGP	Ilhan Fandi
18	DF	SGP	Ryhan Stewart
19	FW	SGP	Farhan Zulkifli
20	DF	SGP	Nur Adam Abdullah
21	FW	SGP	Abdul Rasaq Akeem
22	MF	SGP	Nur Muhammad Asis
23	FW	GLP	Matthias Phaëton
24	MF	FRA	Giovanni Haag
25	GK	CRO	Ivan Sušak
26	DF	AUS	Bailey Wright (vice captain)
29	DF	POR	Diogo Costa
30	FW	NED	Bobby Adekanye
41	MF	JPN	Joshua Little

=== Out on loan ===
Note: Flags indicate national team as defined under FIFA eligibility rules; some limited exceptions apply. Players may hold more than one non-FIFA nationality.

No.	Pos.	Nation	Player
43	FW	SGP	Jonan Tan (at (Croatia) Dugopolje until 30 June 2027)
80	MF	SGP	Nathan Mao (at Young Lions until 30 June 2027)

No.	Pos.	Nation	Player
—	FW	SGP	Khairin Nadim (at Hougang United until 30 June 2027)
—	GK	SLO	Benjamin Žerak (at Young Lions until 30 June 2027)

=== Reserve League (SPL2) squad ===
Note: Flags indicate national team as defined under FIFA eligibility rules; some limited exceptions apply. Players may hold more than one non-FIFA nationality.

No.	Pos.	Nation	Player
51	MF	SGP	Adam Faizal ^{U21}
52	DF	SGP	Aaryan Azraqi
53	MF	SGP	Aaryan Bahadur
54	DF	SGP	Aqil Khusni
55	DF	SGP	Adrian Jaccard
56	MF	SGP	Danish Irfan Abdul Hazin
57	DF	SGP	Caden Pereira
58	MF	NEP	Namsang Rai
59	MF	SGP	Jasper Chen
60	MF	SGP	Yasir Nizamudin
62	MF	SGP	Izrafil Yusof
63	FW	SGP	Ahmad Danial
64	DF	SGP	Tyler Tan
65	GK	SGP	Ilhan Hady
66	MF	AUS	Lobsey Hugh
67	GK	SGP	Issac Goh

No.	Pos.	Nation	Player
68	DF	AUS	Leo Caleb
69	DF	SGP	Aniq Tiryaq
70	FW	SGP	Izzan Farid
71	MF	SGP	Yazid Rais
72	MF	IND	Aaditya Aprameya
73	DF	LTU	Algirdas Karlonas
74	MF	SGP	Iman Naqib
75	DF	SGP	Shlok Ranadive
76	MF	SGP	Isaac Saw
77	MF	SGP	Aufa Basyar
78	MF	SGP	Yu Bin Tan
79	MF	SGP	Aiman Eszuan
80	MF	SGP	Darwisy Johari
81	DF	SGP	Zamir Zamri
82	GK	SGP	Arnav Anand
90	GK	SGP	Naqeeb Shawaluddin

=== Out on loan ===
Note: Flags indicate national team as defined under FIFA eligibility rules; some limited exceptions apply. Players may hold more than one non-FIFA nationality.

No.	Pos.	Nation	Player
3	DF	SGP	Luth Harith (at Young Lions until 30 June 2026)
23	FW	SGP	Daniel Hafiy (at Geylang International until 30 June 2026)
24	FW	SGP	Izrafil Yusof (at Tanjong Pagar United until 30 June 2026)

No.	Pos.	Nation	Player
50	MF	BRA	Enrico Walmarth (at Young Lions 30 June until 2026)
75	FW	ENG	Harry Spence (at Young Lions until 30 June 2026)

== Management and staff ==
Position	Name
Chairman	(Singapore) Forrest Li
Technical director	(Serbia) Luka Lalić
Head coach	(England) Mark Jackson
Assistant coach	(Wales) Cameron Toshack (Australia) Lucas Vilela
Goalkeeper coach	(Slovenia) Kris Stergulc
Chief analyst	(Spain) Varo Moreno
Video analyst	(Singapore) Daniel Lau
Head of Performance	(Singapore) He Qixiang
Conditioning coach	(Portugal) Miguel Braganca
Head of rehabilitation	(Netherlands) Mike Kerklaan
Physiologist	(Netherlands) Niels Van Sundert
Physiologist	(Portugal) André Gonçalves Mendes
Medical logistics	(Singapore) Masrezal
Team manager	(Vietnam) Hương Trần
Kit manager	(Singapore) Zulkifli Ibrahim

== Honours ==
Type	Honours	Titles	Seasons
League	National Football League	1	1985
League	Singapore Premier League	5	1999, 2003, 2021, 2024–25, 2025–26
Cup	Singapore Cup	9	2000, 2001, 2003, 2005, 2011, 2013, 2023, 2024–25, 2025–26
Cup	Singapore Community Shield	4	2019, 2022, 2024, 2026-27
Cup	Singapore FA Cup	3	2013, 2015, 2016

Bold is for those competition that are currently active.

== Award winners ==
=== Singapore Premier League ===
- Player of the Year
  - (Hungary) Zsolt Bücs (1999)
  - (Brazil) Peres de Oliveira (2003)
  - (Thailand) Surachai Jaturapattarapong (2004)
  - (Cameroon) Valery Hiek (2009)
  - (Singapore) Shahril Ishak (2010)
  - (South Korea) Lee Kwan-Woo (2013)
  - (Singapore) Gabriel Quak (2020)
  - (Belgium) Maxime Lestienne (2023)
- Young Player of the Year
  - (France) Sirina Camara (2013)
  - (Singapore) Hami Syahin (2019)
  - (Singapore) Saifullah Akbar (2020)
  - (Singapore) Nur Adam Abdullah (2021)
- Coach of the Year
  - (Netherlands) Robert Alberts (1999)
  - (South Korea) Lee Lim-Saeng (2013)
  - (Serbia) Aleksandar Ranković (2024–25)
- Top Scorer
  - (England) Stuart Young (1998)
  - (Brazil) Peres de Oliveira (2003)
  - (Singapore) Egmar Gonçalves (2004)
  - (Guinea-Bissau) Frédéric Mendy (2012)
  - (Croatia) Stipe Plazibat (2020)
  - (Belgium) Maxime Lestienne (2023)
- Goal of the Year
  - (Singapore) Gabriel Quak against Balestier Khalsa (18 April 2021)
  - (Singapore) Shawal Anuar against Tampines Rovers (29 September 2024)
- Golden Glove
  - (Singapore) Lionel Lewis (2011)
  - (Singapore) Shahril Jantan (2013)
  - (Croatia) Ivan Sušak (2025–26)
- League Team of the Year
  - (Singapore) Faris Ramli (2017)
  - (Singapore) Irfan Fandi (2017)
  - (Croatia) Stipe Plazibat (2017, 2020, 2021)
  - (Singapore) Song Ui-young (2018, 2020)
  - (Singapore) Hafiz Nor (2018)
  - (Singapore) Shahril Ishak (2018)
  - (Singapore) Tajeli Salamat (2020)
  - (Singapore) Gabriel Quak (2020)
  - (Japan) Kaishu Yamazaki (2020)
  - (Brazil) Jorge Fellipe (2021)
  - (Singapore) Nur Adam Abdullah (2021)
  - (Singapore) Shahdan Sulaiman (2021)
  - (Brazil) Pedro Henrique (2022)
  - (Brazil) Diego Lopes (2022, 2023)
  - (Belgium) Maxime Lestienne (2022, 2023, 2024–25)
  - (Singapore) Shawal Anuar (2023, 2024–25)
  - (Croatia) Toni Datković (2024–25, 2025–26)
  - (Australia) Bailey Wright (2024–25, 2025–26)
  - (Netherlands) Bart Ramselaar (2024–25, 2025–26)
  - (Germany) Lennart Thy (2024–25, 2025–26)
  - (Croatia) Ivan Sušak (2025–26)

=== Recognition Awards ===
- Special Award – Sporting Excellence in Singapore Football
  - (Singapore) Adam Swandi (2024–25)
- Special Award – Outstanding Performance
  - (Singapore) Lion City Sailors (2024–25) – AFC Champions League Two Runners-up

==== Media Awards ====
- Story of the Year
  - (Singapore) Kenneth Tan (2023, 2024–25)

=== Others ===
- People's Choice Award
  - (Singapore) Indra Sahdan Daud (2003)
  - (Cameroon) Kengne Ludovick (2008)

== Records and statistics ==
As of 8 November 2026.

Top 10 all-time appearances
Rank	Player	Years	Club appearances
1	(Singapore) Juma'at Jantan	2007–2011, 2013–2019	307
2	(Singapore) Song Ui-young	2011–2023, 2024–present	305
3	(Singapore) Egmar Gonçalves	1996–1998, 2000–2006	255
4	(Singapore) Hafiz Nor	2012, 2018–2026	217
5	(Singapore) Hariss Harun	2017, 2021–present	185
6	(Brazil) Peres De Oliveira	2001–2015, 2008–2010	180
7	(Singapore) Lionel Lewis	2005–2012	164
7	(Singapore) Abdil Qaiyyim	2011, 2015–2019	164
9	(France) Sirina Camara	2013–2018	163
10	(Singapore) Rosman Sulaiman	2004–2005, 2006–2012	161

Top 10 all-time scorers
Rank	Player	Club appearances	Total goals
1	(Singapore) Egmar Gonçalves	255	202
2	(Brazil) Peres De Oliveira	180	107
3	(Singapore) Song Ui-young	305	93
4	(Belgium) Maxime Lestienne	131	70
5	(Croatia) Stipe Plazibat	64	60
6	(Germany) Lennart Thy	83	58
7	(Singapore) Shahril Ishak	158	56
7	(Singapore) Shawal Anuar	122	56
9	(Guinea-Bissau) Frédéric Mendy	65	47
10	(Cameroon) Ludovick Takam	71	45

=== Lion City Sailors centurions ===
As of 8 November 2026

List of players with at least 100 appearances since the club privatised era
No.	Player	Years	Appearances	Date appointed
1	(Singapore) Hariss Harun	2021–present	156	3 December 2024
2	(Singapore) Hafiz Nor	2020–2026	135	22 July 2024
3	(Belgium) Maxime Lestienne	2021–2026	131	11 February 2025
4	(Singapore) Song Ui-young	2020–2022, 2024–present	127	25 April 2025
5	(Singapore) Hami Syahin	2022–present	128	23 September 2025
6	(Singapore) Shawal Anuar	2023–present	126	17 December 2025
7	(Singapore) Lionel Tan	2023–present	112	8 February 2025
8	(Australia) Bailey Wright	2023–present	100	29 October 2026

- Biggest win as Home United: 0–8 vs Geylang International (4 November 2001)
- Biggest win as Lion City Sailors: 1–10 vs Young Lions (13 August 2022)
- Heaviest defeats as Home United: 9–1 vs (North Korea) April 25 SC (28 August 2018)
- Heaviest defeats as Lion City Sailors: 0–6 vs (Japan) Urawa Red Diamonds (27 April 2022)
- Youngest ever debutant: Nathan Mao ~ 15 years and 5 days old (On 31 March 2023 vs Tampines Rovers)
- Oldest ever player: Hassan Sunny ~ 38 years 6 months 5 days old (On 7 October 2022 vs Albirex Niigata (S))
- Youngest goal scorers: Irfan Fandi ~ 19 years 2 months 2 days old (On 15 October 2016 vs Balestier Khalsa)
- Oldest goal scorers: Shahril Ishak ~ 36 years 10 months 12 days old (On 5 December 2020 vs Balestier Khalsa)

== Notable players ==
Eligibility:

- Players who had previously represented the club before returning during the privatised era
- Noted for their contributions in terms of appearances and club honours.

List of notable players since the privatised era of the club (2020–present)
Local	Years	Foreigners	Years
Aqhari Abdullah	2016–2021	(Australia) Bailey Wright	2023–present
Faris Ramli	2021–2022	(Belgium) Maxime Lestienne	2022–2025
Gabriel Quak	2020–2022	(Brazil) Anderson Lopes	2025–2026
Hafiz Nor	2012, 2018–present	(Brazil) Diego Lopes	2021–2023
Hariss Harun	2017, 2021–present	(Brazil) Jorge Fellipe	2021
Hassan Sunny	2017, 2020–2022	(Brazil) Pedro Henrique	2022–2023
Izwan Mahbud	2022–present	(Croatia) Stipe Plazibat	2017, 2020–2021
Shahdan Sulaiman	2009–2010, 2020–2022	(Croatia) Toni Datković	2024–present
Shahril Ishak	2007–2010, 2018–2021	(Germany) Lennart Thy	2024–present
Shawal Anuar	2023–present	(Germany) Tsiy-William Ndenge	2025–present
Song Ui-young	2011–2023, 2024–present	(Japan) Kaishu Yamazaki	2021–2023
		(South Korea) Kim Shin-wook	2022
		(Netherlands) Bart Ramselaar	2024–present
		(Portugal) Rui Pires	2023–2026
		(Portugal) Diogo Costa	2025–present

=== International capped players ===
AFC/OFC.: (Australia) Bailey Wright; (Australia) Bernie Ibini-Isei; (Australia) Ernie Tapai; (Australia) George Kulcsar; (Australia) Isaka Cernak; (Australia) Oliver Puflett; (Australia) Vlado Bozinovski; (Japan) Hiroaki Tanaka; (Thailand) Anucha Chuaysri; (Thailand) Anurak Srikerd; (Thailand) Kornprom Jaroonpong; (Thailand) Naruphol Ar-romsawa; (Thailand) Sutee Suksomkit; (Thailand) Surachai Jaturapattarapong; (South Korea) An Hyo-yeon; (South Korea) Choi Chul-woo; (South Korea) Chun Jae-woon; (South Korea) Jeon Kyung-jun; (South Korea) Kim Dae-eui; (South Korea) Kim Shin-wook; (South Korea) Lee Kwan-woo; (Syria) Ali Al Rina	CAF.: (Central African Republic) Franklin Anzité; (Guinea-Bissau) Frédéric Mendy	UEFA.: (Belgium) Maxime Lestienne; (Croatia) Antonio Mance; (Croatia) Toni Datković; (Denmark) Ken Ilsø; (Hungary) Zsolt Bücs; (France) Ambroise Begue; (Georgia (country)) Jorge Karseladze; (Germany) Lennart Thy; (Germany) Tsiy-William Ndenge; (Netherlands) Bart Ramselaar; (Netherlands) Bobby Adekanye; (Portugal) Rui Pires; (Serbia) Luka Adžić	CONMEBOL/ CONCACAF.: (Canada) Sherif El-Masri; (Guadeloupe) Matthias Phaëton; (Curaçao) Richairo Živković

== Club captains ==
Year	Captain
1996–1998	(Singapore) TBC
1999–2007	(Singapore) S. Subramani
2008–2010	(Brazil) Peres De Oliveira
2011–2012	(Singapore) Shi Jiayi
2013–2014	(Singapore) Noh Rahman
2015–2016	(Singapore) Juma'at Jantan
2017	(Singapore) Hassan Sunny
2018–2020	(Singapore) Izzdin Shafiq
2021	(Singapore) Hassan Sunny
2022–present	(Singapore) Hariss Harun

== Managerial history ==
=== Performance by coach ===
The following table provides a summary of the coach appointed by the club.

Statistics correct as of 9 February 2026

Coach	Season	Achievements
(Brazil) Carlos Roberto Pereira	1 January 1996–5 June 1997	
(Singapore) Ibrahim Awang	6 June 1997–14 August 1998	
(Netherlands) Robert Alberts	15 August 1998–31 December 2001	1999 S.League 2000 Singapore Cup 2001 Singapore Cup
(England) Jason Withe	1 January 2002–7 August 2002	
(Singapore) Yakob Hashim (caretaker)	8 August 2002–31 August 2002	
(England) Steve Darby	1 September 2002–7 November 2005	2003 S.League 2003 Singapore Cup 2005 Singapore Cup
(Hungary) Zsolt Bűcs	13 January 2006–30 August 2006	
(Singapore) Vincent Subramaniam	1 September 2006–31 December 2007	
(Singapore) P. N. Sivaji	1 January 2008–31 December 2009	
(South Korea) Lee Lim-saeng	1 January 2010–5 December 2014	2011 Singapore Cup 2013 Singapore Cup
(Singapore) Philippe Aw	1 January 2015–30 July 2016	
(Singapore) Aidil Sharin Sahak	4 August 2016–7 October 2018	
(Singapore) Saswadimata Dasuki	3 December 2018–19 April 2019	2019 Singapore Community Shield
(Singapore) Noh Rahman (caretaker)	19 April 2019–1 July 2019	
(Serbia) Radojko Avramović	2 July 2019–18 August 2019	
(Singapore) Noh Rahman (caretaker)	18 August 2019–18 December 2019	
==== As Lion City Sailors ====
(Australia) Aurelio Vidmar	18 December 2019–29 April 2021	
(Singapore) Robin Chitrakar (caretaker)	30 April 2021–22 May 2021	
(South Korea) Kim Do-hoon	18 May 2021–11 August 2022	2021 Singapore Premier League 2022 Singapore Community Shield
(Serbia) Luka Lalić (interim)	12 August 2022–31 December 2022	
(Serbia) Risto Vidaković	1 January 2022–18 June 2023	
(Netherlands) Daan van Oudheusden (caretaker)	19 June 2023–29 June 2023	
(Serbia) Aleksandar Ranković	30 June 2023–6 February 2026	2023 Singapore Cup 2024 Singapore Community Shield 2024-–25 Singapore Premier League 2024–25 Singapore Cup 2024–25 AFC Champions League Two runners-up
(Spain) Varo Moreno (caretaker)	6 February 2026–22 February 2026	
(Spain) Jesús Casas	23 February 2026–1 September 2026	
(Spain) Varo Moreno (caretaker) (2)	1 September 2026–9 September 2026	2026 Singapore Community Shield
(England) Mark Jackson	9 September 2026–present	

== Season by season record ==
Season	Club name	League	Pos.	P	W	D	L	GS	GA	Pts	Singapore Cup	League Cup
1996-1	Police FC	S.League	6th	14	4	5	5	22	23	17		
1996-2	Police FC	S.League	8th	14	6	3	5	20	16	21		
1997	Home United	S.League	9th	16	2	1	3	17	41	7		
1998	Home United	S.League	7th	20	8	4	8	42	28	28	Third place	
1999	Home United	S.League	1st	22	15	6	1	42	16	51	Third place	
2000	Home United	S.League	4th	22	11	7	4	38	21	40	Winners	
2001	Home United	S.League	3rd	33	23	3	7	69	36	72	Winners	
2002	Home United	S.League	2nd	33	18	10	5	71	42	64	Quarter-finals	
2003	Home United	S.League	1st	33	26	2	3	104	42	85	Winners	
2004	Home United	S.League	2nd	27	17	2	8	76	43	53	Runners-up	
2005	Home United	S.League	4th	27	14	4	9	62	44	46	Winners	
2006	Home United	S.League	4th	30	15	6	9	49	40	51	Round of 16	
2007	Home United	S.League	2nd	33	24	6	3	73	35	78	Quarter-finals	Third Place
2008	Home United	S.League	3rd	33	23	3	7	75	31	72	Quarter-finals	Quarter-finals
2009	Home United	S.League	4th	30	16	5	9	50	32	53	Quarter-finals	Third place
2010	Home United	S.League	3rd	33	18	11	4	55	31	65	Round of 16	Quarter-finals
2011	Home United	S.League	2nd	33	25	2	6	81	29	77	Winners	Third place
2012	Home United	S.League	5th	24	11	7	6	43	29	40	Quarter-finals	Quarter-finals
2013	Home United	S.League	2nd	27	16	3	8	42	25	51	Winners	Quarter-finals
2014	Home United	S.League	4th	27	13	5	9	52	41	44	Runners-up	Quarter-finals
2015	Home United	S.League	6th	27	9	9	9	38	34	36	Runners-up	Group stage
2016	Home United	S.League	4th	24	11	4	9	50	42	37	Quarter-finals	Semi-finals
2017	Home United	S.League	3rd	24	15	5	4	58	26	50	Third place	Group stage
2018	Home United	Singapore Premier League	2nd	24	12	7	5	48	36	43	Third place	
2019	Home United	Singapore Premier League	6th	24	9	3	12	34	46	30	Group stage	
2020	Lion City Sailors	Singapore Premier League	3rd	14	8	3	3	44	18	27		
2021	Lion City Sailors	Singapore Premier League	1st	21	14	6	1	59	21	48		
2022	Lion City Sailors	Singapore Premier League	2nd	28	18	3	7	91	39	57	Group stage	
2023	Lion City Sailors	Singapore Premier League	2nd	24	17	3	4	79	39	54	Winners	
2024–25	Lion City Sailors	Singapore Premier League	1st	32	22	6	4	96	32	72	Winners	
2025–26	Lion City Sailors	Singapore Premier League	1st	21	16	3	2	70	14	51	Winners	

== Continental record ==
Season	Competition	Round	Club	Home	Away	Aggregate
2004	AFC Cup	Group D	(Hong Kong) Happy Valley	5–1	2–0	1st out of 4
2004	AFC Cup	Group D	(Maldives) Valencia VC	5–0	3–0	1st out of 4
2004	AFC Cup	Group D	(Malaysia) Perak FA	2–2	2–2	1st out of 4
2004	AFC Cup	Quarter-finals	(Lebanon) Olympic Beirut	2–1	3–3	5–4
2004	AFC Cup	Semi-finals	(Syria) Al-Jaish	1–1	0–4	1–5
2005	AFC Cup	Group E	(Malaysia) Pahang FA	2–1	3–3	1st out of 4
2005	AFC Cup	Group E	(Hong Kong) Happy Valley	5–0	1–0	1st out of 4
2005	AFC Cup	Group E	(Maldives) New Radiant	2–0	0–1	1st out of 4
2005	AFC Cup	Quarter-finals	(Lebanon) Al-Nejmeh Beirut	0–3	2–3	2–6
2006	AFC Cup	Group E	(Malaysia) Perlis FA	2–3	0–1	3rd out of 4
2006	AFC Cup	Group E	(Hong Kong) Xiangxue Sun Hei	0–2	1–0	3rd out of 4
2006	AFC Cup	Group E	(Maldives) New Radiant	2–0	3–5	3rd out of 4
2008	AFC Cup	Group D	(Hong Kong) South China	4–1	3–2	1st out of 4
2008	AFC Cup	Group D	(Malaysia) Kedah	5–1	1–4	1st out of 4
2008	AFC Cup	Group D	(Maldives) Victory	2–1	3–1	1st out of 4
2008	AFC Cup	Quarter-finals	(India) Dempo	3–4	1–1	4–5
2009	AFC Cup	Group H	(Vietnam) Bình Dương	2–1	0–2	2nd out of 4
2009	AFC Cup	Group H	(Thailand) PEA	3–1	1–2	2nd out of 4
2009	AFC Cup	Group H	(Maldives) Club Valencia	5–1	1–0	2nd out of 4
2009	AFC Cup	Round of 16	(Hong Kong) South China	0–4		
2012	AFC Cup	Group G	(Hong Kong) Citizen	3–1	2–1	2nd out of 4
2012	AFC Cup	Group G	(Thailand) Chonburi	1–2	0–1	2nd out of 4
2012	AFC Cup	Group G	(Myanmar) Yangon United	3–1	0–0	2nd out of 4
2012	AFC Cup	Round of 16	(Syria) Al-Shorta	0–3		
2014	AFC Cup	Group E	(Maldives) New Radiant	2–0	0–1	3rd out of 4
2014	AFC Cup	Group E	(Indonesia) Persipura Jayapura	1–1	2–0	3rd out of 4
2014	AFC Cup	Group E	(India) Churchill Brothers	2–1	1–3	3rd out of 4
2017	AFC Cup	Group H	(Myanmar) Yadanarbon	4–1	0–1	1st out of 3
2017	AFC Cup	Group H	(Vietnam) Than Quảng Ninh	3–2	5–4	1st out of 3
2017	AFC Cup	Zonal semi-finals	(Philippines) Global Cebu	3–2	2–2	5–4
2017	AFC Cup	Zonal finals	(Philippines) Ceres Negros	2–1	0–2	2–3
2018	AFC Cup	Group F	(Myanmar) Shan United	3–2	1–0	1st out of 4
2018	AFC Cup	Group F	(Philippines) United City	1–1	2–0	1st out of 4
2018	AFC Cup	Group F	(Cambodia) Boeung Ket	6–0	2–3	1st out of 4
2018	AFC Cup	Zonal semi-finals	(Indonesia) Persija Jakarta	3–2	3–1	6–3
2018	AFC Cup	Zonal finals	(Philippines) Ceres Negros	2–0	1–1	3–1
2018	AFC Cup	Inter-zone play-off semi-finals	(North Korea) April 25	0–2	1–9	1–11
2019	AFC Champions League	Preliminary round 1	(Indonesia) Persija Jakarta	1–3		
2019	AFC Cup	Group H	(Indonesia) PSM Makassar	1–1	2–3	2nd out of 4
2019	AFC Cup	Group H	(Philippines) Kaya–Iloilo	2–0	0–5	2nd out of 4
2019	AFC Cup	Group H	(Laos) Lao Toyota	1–0	3–2	2nd out of 4
2022	AFC Champions League	2022 AFC Champions League	(Japan) Urawa Red Diamonds	1–4	0–6	3rd out of 4
2022	AFC Champions League	2022 AFC Champions League	(South Korea) Daegu FC	1–2	3–0	3rd out of 4
2022	AFC Champions League	2022 AFC Champions League	(China) Shandong Taishan	3–2	0–0	3rd out of 4
2023–24	AFC Champions League	Group F	(Thailand) Bangkok United	1–2	0–1	3rd out of 4
2023–24	AFC Champions League	Group F	(Hong Kong) Kitchee	0–2	2–1	3rd out of 4
2023–24	AFC Champions League	Group F	(South Korea) Jeonbuk Hyundai Motors	2–0	0–3	3rd out of 4
2024–25	AFC Champions League Two	Group F	(China) Zhejiang	2–0	2–4	1st out of 4
2024–25	AFC Champions League Two	Group F	(Indonesia) Persib Bandung	2–3	1–1	1st out of 4
2024–25	AFC Champions League Two	Group F	(Thailand) Port	5–2	3–1	1st out of 4
2024–25	AFC Champions League Two	Round of 16	(Thailand) Muangthong United	4–0	3–2	7–2
2024–25	AFC Champions League Two	Quarter-finals	(Japan) Sanfrecce Hiroshima	1–1	3–0 (Note: Lion City Sailors were awarded a 0–3 victory by forfeit, after Sanfrecce Hiroshima fielded an ineligible player. The score on the field was a 6–1 win by Sanfrecce Hiroshima.)	4–1
2024–25	AFC Champions League Two	Semi-finals	(Australia) Sydney FC	2–0	0–1	2–1
2024–25	AFC Champions League Two	Final	(United Arab Emirates) Sharjah	1–2		
2024–25	ASEAN Club Championship	Group B	(Indonesia) Borneo Samarinda	—N/a	0–3	5th out of 6
2024–25	ASEAN Club Championship	Group B	(Vietnam) Cong An Hanoi	—N/a	0–5	5th out of 6
2024–25	ASEAN Club Championship	Group B	(Malaysia) Kuala Lumpur City	2–0	—N/a	5th out of 6
2024–25	ASEAN Club Championship	Group B	(Thailand) Buriram United	0–0	—N/a	5th out of 6
2024–25	ASEAN Club Championship	Group B	(Philippines) Kaya–Iloilo	—N/a	0–2	5th out of 6
2025–26	AFC Champions League Two	Group G	(Indonesia) Persib Bandung	3–2	1–1	3rd out of 4
2025–26	AFC Champions League Two	Group G	(Malaysia) Selangor	4–1	1–0	3rd out of 4
2025–26	AFC Champions League Two	Group G	(Thailand) Bangkok United	1–2	0–1	3rd out of 4
2025–26	ASEAN Club Championship	Group B	(Malaysia) Johor Darul Ta'zim	—N/a	1–3	4th out of 6
2025–26	ASEAN Club Championship	Group B	(Thailand) Bangkok United	—N/a	2–2	4th out of 6
2025–26	ASEAN Club Championship	Group B	(Myanmar) Shan United	3–2	—N/a	4th out of 6
2025–26	ASEAN Club Championship	Group B	(Vietnam) Nam Định	—N/a	0–3	4th out of 6
2025–26	ASEAN Club Championship	Group B	(Cambodia) Preah Khan Reach Svay Rieng	0–2	—N/a	4th out of 6
2026–27	AFC Champions League Two	Group F	(Thailand) BG Pathum United	1–1		
2026–27	AFC Champions League Two	Group F	(Hong Kong) Tai Po		1–0	
2026–27	AFC Champions League Two	Group F	(Australia) Adelaide United	5–0	2–0	
2026–27	ASEAN Club Championship	Group B	(Vietnam) Công An Hà Nội	0–1	—N/a	
2026–27	ASEAN Club Championship	Group B	(Indonesia) Persib Bandung		—N/a	
2026–27	ASEAN Club Championship	Group B	(Cambodia) Preah Khan Reach Svay Rieng	—N/a		
2026–27	ASEAN Club Championship	Group B	(Thailand) Port		—N/a	
2026–27	ASEAN Club Championship	Group B	(Myanmar) Shan United	—N/a		
2026–27	ASEAN Club Championship	Group B	(Malaysia) Johor Darul Ta'zim	—N/a		

== Performance in AFC competitions ==
- AFC Champions League/AFC Champions League Elite

2022: Group stage
2023–24: Group stage

- AFC Cup/AFC Champions League Two:

2004: Semi-final
2005: Quarter-final
2006: Group stage
2008: Quarter-final
2009: Quarter-final
2012: Round of 16
2014: Group stage
2017: Zonal finals
2018: Inter-zone play-off semi-finals
2019: Group stage
2021: Cancelled
2024–25: Runners-up
2025–26: Group stage

Lion City Sailors notable wins in AFC fixtures
2022 AFC Champions League group stage - Daegu FC 0–3 Lion City Sailors at the Buriram City Stadium on 18 April 2022	2023–24 AFC Champions League group stage - Lion City Sailors 2–0 Jeonbuk Hyundai Motors on 8 November 2023	2024–25 AFC Champions League Two semi-final, Lion City Sailors 2–0 Sydney FC, 9 April 2025

== Performance in AFF competitions ==
- ASEAN Club Championship

2024–25: Group stage
2025–26: Group stage

== See also ==
- Lion City Sailors (women)
