= Ballamodou Conde =

Guinean footballer (born 1973)

Balla Conde
Personal information
- Full name: Ballamodou Conde
- Date of birth: 18 October 1973 (age 53)
- Place of birth: Conakry, Guinea
- Height: 1.83 m (6 ft 0 in)
- Position: Midfielder

Team information
- Current team: South Coast Wolves (assistant)

Senior career*
Years	Team	Apps	(Gls)
1989–1994	Horoya AC		
1995	Sfaxien		
1996	Al Jahra		
1997–1998	Penang FA		
1999–2001	Parramatta Eagles		
2000–2001	→ Gombak United (loan)		
2001	Gombak United		
2002–2004	Singapore Armed Forces		
2004–2005	Bonnyrigg White Eagles		
2005	Bossy Liverpool		
2006–2008	Wollongong FC		
2007	→ Geylang United (loan)		

International career
2001–2002	Guinea	17	(?)

Managerial career
- 2009–: South Coast Wolves (assistant)
- * Club domestic league appearances and goals

Ballamodou "Balla" Conde (born 18 October 1973) is a retired Guinean footballer who played as a midfielder.

== Club career ==
Conde made his professional debuts at the age of 16 with Horoya AC in the Guinean League, making a substantial contribution as the team won three national championships. In 1997, after spells in Tunisia and Kuwait, he joined Penang FA in the Malaysian League, reaching and losing the domestic cup final in his first year at the club, and becoming team captain the following year, which ended in league conquest.

Conde would then play most of the following decade in Australia, starting with the Parramatta Eagles of the NSW Premier League where he played two years, helping the team to a final and a last-four appearance. Afterwards, he represented two teams in the Singaporean S-League, Gombak United FC and the Singapore Armed Forces FC, before returning to his previous country, signing with the Bonnyrigg White Eagles Football Club for 2004–05.

After a brief stint with FC Bossy Liverpool in the New South Wales Winter Super League, Conde joined Wollongong Football Club, playing with the Illawarra side until his retirement at age 35. He stayed with the club subsequently, working as an assistant coach.

In 2016, Balla commenced his own academy training Australia's next generation of Football Stars. His academy based in St Marys, NSW coaches children from age 2 to All ages. Australian Football Generation Stars(AFGS) is now the Penrith regions leading academy.
