= 2026–27 Tanjong Pagar United FC season =

Tanjong Pagar United
2026–27 season
- Chairman: Rajesh Nair
- Coach: (Spain) Miki Llado (appointed 11 Aug)
- Ground: Jurong East Stadium
- S.League: TBD
- Singapore Cup: TBD
- Top goalscorer: League: TBD; All: TBD
- Highest home attendance: TBD
- Lowest home attendance: TBD
- Average home league attendance: TBD
Home colours	Away colours

The 2026–27 season is Tanjong Pagar United's 21th season at the top level of Singapore football. It will be their sixth consecutive season in the Singapore Premier League. The club will also compete in the Singapore Cup.

This season, Tanjong Pagar United will enter a new era under fresh management. Rajesh Nair will be the new chairman and a new management committee that includes former Singapore national midfielder Goh Tat Chuan will lead the team.

== Squad ==
=== Singapore Premier League ===
As of 15 Feb 2026

No.	Name	Nationality	Date of Birth (Age)	Last club	Contract Since	Contract End
Goalkeepers
12	Kenji Rusydi	(Singapore)	12 July 1998 (age 28)	(Singapore) Hougang United	2025	2027
24	Rudy Khairullah	(Singapore)	19 July 1994 (age 32)	(Singapore) Geylang International	2026	2027
27	Yue Liantian	(China)	17 May 2004 (age 22)	(Brunei) Indera SC	2026	2027
41	Hazwan Afiq	(Singapore)		(Singapore) Tanjong Pagar United U21	2025	2027
72	Travis Ang Jia Zheng	(Singapore)	23 October 2004 (age 22)	(Singapore) Young Lions	2026	2027
82	Aitor Mujica	(Spain)	11 September 2001 (age 25)	(Spain) CD Ebro	2026	2027
Defenders
5	Syed Akmal	(Singapore)	28 April 2000 (age 26)	(Singapore) Young Lions	2023	2027
6	Madhu Mohana	(Singapore)	6 March 1991 (age 35)	(Singapore) Balestier Khalsa	2026	2027
8	Yuki Aizu	(Japan)	1 August 1996 (age 30)	(Myanmar) Shan United	2026	2027
15	Marcus Mosses	(Singapore)	21 January 2005 (age 21)	(Singapore) Young Lions	2026	2027
20	Marvin Anieboh	(Equatorial Guinea) (Spain)	26 August 1997 (age 29)	(Spain) SS Reyes	2026	2027
21	Kieran Teo Jia Jun	(Singapore)	6 April 2004 (age 22)	(Singapore) Young Lions	2026	2027
22	Syahrul Sazali	(Singapore)	3 June 1998 (age 28)	(Singapore) FC Jurong	2025	2027
26	Haziq Zulkifli	(Singapore)		(Singapore) Tanjong Pagar United U17	2025	2027
30	Hafid Sohan Rifa'i	(Singapore)		Singapore Football Club	2025	2027
34	Deshan Gunasegara	(Malaysia) (Singapore)		(Singapore) Balestier Khalsa	2026	2027
37	Daniyal Lynn Rasor	(Singapore)	7 January 2004 (age 22)	(Singapore) Balestier Khalsa	2026	2027
43	Amiruddin Razali ^{SPL2 & U19}	(Singapore)		(Singapore)	2026	2027
45	Mattia Iuculano ^{SPL2 & U19}	(Italy)		(Singapore) Tanjong Pagar United U19	2026	2027
48	Sam Ho Khai Sheng ^{SPL2 & U19}	(Singapore)		(Singapore) Tanjong Pagar United U19	2026	2027
59	Deva Shriram ^{SPL2 & U19}	(India)		(Singapore)	2026	2027
65	Shaikh Ziqry Shaikh ^{SPL2 & U19}	(Singapore)		(Singapore)	2026	2027
75	Bradly Yap Zhi Hao	(Singapore)	28 June 2006 (age 20)	(Singapore) Balestier Khalsa	2025	2027
Midfielders
4	Jared Gallagher	(Singapore) (Republic of Ireland)	18 January 2002 (age 24)	(Thailand) Nakhon Ratchasima	2026	2027
7	Lazar Vujanić	(Serbia)	18 September 1999 (age 27)	(Singapore) Balestier Khalsa	2026	2027
10	Masahiro Sugita	(Japan)	24 November 1999 (age 26)	(Singapore) Balestier Khalsa	2026	2027
17	Naqiuddin Eunos	(Singapore)	1 December 1997 (age 28)	(Singapore) Geylang International	2025	2027
18	Álex Masogo	(Equatorial Guinea) (Spain)	26 January 2001 (age 25)	(Bulgaria) Beroe	2026	2027
19	Samuel Pillai	(Singapore)	22 February 2005 (age 21)	(Singapore) Young Lions	2025	2027
23	Fathullah Rahmat	(Singapore)	5 September 2002 (age 24)	(Singapore) Young Lions	2021	2027
31	Adly Irfan	(Singapore)		(Singapore) Balestier Khalsa	2026	2027
33	Xia Zeyu ^{SPL2 & U19}	(Singapore)		(Singapore)	2026	2027
36	Lucas Alessandro Yeo ^{SPL2 & U19}	(Singapore) (Indonesia)		(Singapore) Balestier Khalsa U17	2026	2027
44	Irhan Hussaini Saifudin ^{SPL2 & U19}	(Singapore)		(Singapore)	2026	2027
47	Vinnie Ucchino	(Australia) (Croatia) (Italy)	29 April 2010 (age 16)	(Singapore) Tanjong Pagar United U15	2025	2027
48	Darren Choong Cheng Jun ^{SPL2 & U19}	(Singapore)		(Singapore) Tampines Rovers U17	2026	2027
50	Miro Valio Jai ^{SPL2 & U19}	(Finland)		(Singapore) Tanjong Pagar United U19	2026	2027
52	Dhafyr Iman ^{SPL2 & U19}	(Singapore)		Singapore Khalsa Association U17	2026	2027
56	Neil Callanta ^{SPL2 & U19}	(Philippines)	8 March 2007 (age 19)	(Singapore) Hougang United	2026	2027
61	E-Ray Izaac ^{SPL2 & U19}	(Singapore)		(Singapore)	2026	2027
66	Anaqi Ismit	(Singapore)	24 August 2001 (age 25)	(Singapore) Lion City Sailors	2024	2027
67	Fazul Azim	(Singapore)		(Singapore) Balestier Khalsa	2026	2027
68	Jeff Lam	(Singapore)		(Singapore) Young Lions	2026	2027
69	Anaqee Basheer	(Singapore)		(Singapore) Hougang United	2026	2027
70	Lim Xuan Hui ^{SPL2 & U19}	(Singapore)		(Singapore) Tanjong Pagar United U15	2025	2027
Forwards
9	Boris Kopitović	(Montenegro)	27 April 1995 (age 31)	(Indonesia) Bali United (I1)	2026	2027
11	Riku Fukashiro	(Japan)	12 April 2000 (age 26)	(Singapore) Geylang International	2026	2027
13	Taufik Suparno	(Singapore)	31 October 1995 (age 31)	(Singapore) BG Tampines Rovers	2026	2027
28	Zahil Rahman	(Singapore)	3 March 2003 (age 23)	(Singapore) Tanjong Pagar United U21	2023	2027
29	Risvi Aaqil	(Singapore)	7 September 2005 (age 21)	(Singapore) Tanjong Pagar United U21	2023	2027
32	Shahreez Basheer	(Singapore)	8 May 2005 (age 21)	(Singapore) Hougang United	2026	2027
35	Raoul Shah	(Singapore)		(Singapore) Star Soccer Academy	2026	2027
38	Khasmir Effendi	(Singapore)		(Singapore)	2026	2027
39	Darius Lai Jyun Tang	(Singapore)	15 January 2009 (age 17)	(Singapore) Tanjong Pagar United U17	2025	2027
58	Noorazhar Abdullah Latip ^{SPL2 & U19}	(Singapore)		(Singapore)	2026	2027
	Javi Gómez	(Spain)	10 January 1999 (age 27)	(Spain) Guadalajara	2026	2027
Players left during season
Players on NS
Players who left during mid-season
51	Nils Carballeira	(Norway) (France)		(Singapore) Tanjong Pagar United U17	2026	2027

Remarks:
^{FP U21} These players are registered as U21 foreign players.

=== Women Squad (2026) ===
As of 14 Mar 2021

No.	Name	Nationality	Date of Birth (Age)	Last club	Contract Since	Contract End
Goalkeepers
1	Ilya Batrisyia	(Singapore)		(Singapore)		2026
24	Vanessa Tan	(Singapore)		(Singapore)		2026
Defenders
2	Abigail Goh Su En	(Singapore)		(Singapore) Still Aerion WFC	2024	2026
4	Shayeerah Huq	(Singapore)		(Singapore)		2026
5	Naomi Tan Ni Wa	(Singapore)		(Singapore) Nanyang Polytechnic		2026
12	Gan Hui Yi	(Singapore)		(Singapore)		2026
13	Anupriya Subramanian	(Singapore)		(Singapore) Still Aerion WFC	2025	2026
Midfielders
7	Nur Syakirah Jumain	(Singapore)		(Singapore) BG Tampines Rovers		2026
10	Nuriah Noor	(Singapore)		(Singapore)	2024	2026
11	Alyssa Deanna Yazrin	(Singapore)	6 December 1999 (age 26)	(Singapore)	2024	2026
14	Denise Chu	(Singapore)		(Singapore)		2026
15	Crystal Wu	(Singapore)	13 September 2006 (age 20)	(Singapore)		2026
23	Abigail Heng Rae Ern	(Singapore)		(Singapore)		2026
Forwards
9	Matthea Ashwini	(Singapore)		(Singapore) Balestier Khalsa		2026
17	Nur Faradila Rafidi	(Singapore)	15 October 1998 (age 28)	(Singapore) Albirex Niigata (S)		2026
22	Pan Shi Yu	(Singapore)		(Singapore)		2026
Players who left during mid-season

== Coaching staff ==
Management Team

Position	Name
Chairman	(Singapore) Rajesh Nair
Vice Chairman	(Singapore) Goh Tat Chuan
General Manager	(Singapore) Desmund Khusnin
Sporting Director	(Spain) Quim Besora

First Team

Position	Name	Ref.
Team Manager	(Singapore)	
Head Coach	(Spain) Miguel Llado	
Head Coach (Women)	(Singapore) Samawira Basri	
Assistant Coach & SPL2 Head Coach	(Singapore) Jaslee Hatta	
Goalkeeping Coach	(Malaysia) Khairul Nizam	
Fitness Coach	(Spain) Nil Asensio	
Physiotherapist	(Singapore) Fadhli Hussein	
Sport Scientist	(Singapore) Mukhlis Sawit	
Kitman	(Singapore) Azwan Hishamuddin	
Video Analyst	(Singapore)	

Academy

Position	Name
Head of Youth & U19 Coach	(Singapore) Indra Sahdan
U17 Coach	(Singapore) Ridhuan Muhammad
U15 Coach	(Singapore) Ismail Yunos
U15 Goalkeeper Coach	(Singapore) Rizal Rahman

== Pre-season friendlies ==
Win Draw Loss

8 August 2026 1	Tanjong Pagar United (Singapore)	1–2	(Singapore) Hougang United	Jurong East
	81'		Connor Flynn-Gillespie 45' (pen.); Khairin Nadim 56'	Stadium: Jurong East Stadium

15 August 2026 2	Johor Darul Ta'zim (Malaysia)	6-0	(Singapore) Tanjong Pagar United	Johor, Malaysia
	Marcos Guilherme 14', 20'; Bergson 38', 53'; Shahab Zahedi 65', 67'			Stadium: Sultan Ibrahim Stadium

20 August 2026 3	Tanjong Pagar United (Singapore)	1–1	(Singapore) Balestier Khalsa	Jurong East
			Taufik Suparno 66'	Stadium: Jurong East Stadium

4 September 2026 4	Tanjong Pagar United (Singapore)	0–0	(Singapore) FC Jurong	Jurong East
				Stadium: Jurong East Stadium

4 October 2026 5	Young Lions (Singapore)	0–3	(Singapore) Tanjong Pagar United	Bedok
				Stadium: Bedok Stadium

14 November 2026 6	Tanjong Pagar United (Singapore)	0–3	(Singapore) Hougang United	Jurong East
		Report		Stadium: Jurong East Stadium

== Transfers ==
=== In ===
Preseason

Date	Position	Player	Transferred from	Ref
First team
1 July 2026	FW	(Montenegro) Boris Kopitović	(Indonesia) Bali United	Free
1 July 2026	GK	(Singapore) Rudy Khairullah	(Singapore) Geylang International	Free
1 July 2026	GK	(Singapore) Travis Ang	(Singapore) Young Lions	Free
1 July 2026	GK	(China) Yue Liantian	(Brunei) Indera SC	Free
1 July 2026	DF	(Singapore) (Malaysia) Deshan Gunasegara	(Singapore) Balestier Khalsa	Free
1 July 2026	DF	(Singapore) Daniyal Lynn Rasor	(Singapore) Balestier Khalsa	Free
1 July 2026	MF	(Philippines) Neil Charles Callanta	(Singapore) Hougang United	Free
1 July 2026	MF	(Singapore) Anaqee Basheer	N.A.	Free
1 July 2026	FW	(Singapore) Shahreez Basheer	N.A.	Free
9 July 2026	FW	(Singapore) Taufik Suparno	(Singapore) Tampines Rovers	Free
11 August 2026	GK	(Spain) Aitor Mujica	(Spain) CD Ebro	Free
11 August 2026	DF	(Japan) Yuki Aizu	(Myanmar) Shan United	Free
12 August 2026	DF	(Equatorial Guinea) (Spain) Marvin Anieboh	(Spain) SS Reyes	Free
12 August 2026	DF	(Singapore) Madhu Mohana	(Singapore) Balestier Khalsa	Free
12 August 2026	DF	(Singapore) Marcus Mosses	(Singapore) Lion City Sailors	Free
12 August 2026	DF	(Singapore) Kieran Teo Jia Jun	(Singapore) Young Lions	Free
13 August 2026	MF	(Singapore) (Republic of Ireland) Jared Gallagher	(Thailand) Nakhon Ratchasima	Free
13 August 2026	MF	(Serbia) Lazar Vujanić	(Singapore) Balestier Khalsa	Free
14 August 2026	MF	(Japan) Masahiro Sugita	(Singapore) Balestier Khalsa	Free
14 August 2026	FW	(Singapore) Zahil Rahman	(Singapore) SAFSA	End of NS
3 September 2026	FW	(Japan) Riku Fukashiro	(Singapore) Geylang International	Free
14 September 2026	MF	(Equatorial Guinea) (Spain) Álex Masogo	(Bulgaria) Beroe	Free
SPL2, U23 & Academy

Mid Season

Date	Position	Player	Transferred from	Ref
First team
SPL2, U23 & Academy

=== Out ===
Preseason

Date (Note: Date of club's announcement, will be either date of club announcement or 1 Jun-2025, the date which the free agent start due to lapse of previous contract)	Position	Player	Transferred to	Ref
First team
1 June 2026	FW	(Singapore) Izrafil Yusof	(Singapore) Lion City Sailors	End of loan
30 June 2026	GK	(Singapore) Sunny Tia Yang Guang	Retired	N.A.
30 June 2026	GK	(Singapore) Zaiful Nizam	(Singapore)	Free
30 June 2026	GK	(Singapore) Ryan Effendy	(Singapore)	Free
30 June 2026	GK	(Canada) (Portugal) Matt Silva	(Gibraltar) Lynx	Free
30 June 2026	DF	(Australia) (Croatia) Aaron Evans	(Singapore)	Free
30 June 2026	DF	(South Korea) Kim Li-Kwan	(Singapore)	Free
30 June 2026	MF	(Australia) Jesse Daley	(Singapore)	Free
30 June 2026	MF	(Japan) Shodai Nishikawa	(Singapore)	Free
30 June 2026	MF	(Singapore) Raihan Rahman	(Singapore) Warwick Knights	Free
30 June 2026	MF	(Singapore) Naufal Ilham	(Singapore)	Free
30 June 2026	FW	(Singapore) Syahadat Masnawi	(Singapore)	Free
30 June 2026	FW	(Timor-Leste) Zenivio	(Timor-Leste) Karketu Dili	Free
8 July 2026	MF	(Singapore) Aloysius Pang	(Singapore) FC Jurong	Free
23 July 2026	FW	(Italy) (Ivory Coast) Junior Djile	(Cyprus) Ermis Aradippou	Free
30 July 2026	DF	(Singapore) Faizal Roslan	Retired	N.A.
1 August 2026	FW	(Singapore) Sahil Suhaimi	(Singapore) Geylang International	Free
14 August 2026	DF	(South Korea) Lee Chan-woo	(South Korea) Jincheon HR (K4)	Free
30 August 2026	MF	(Chinese Taipei) (Canada) Emilio Estevez	(Hong Kong) Tai Po	Free
8 September 2026	MF	(Singapore) (Pakistan) Azim Akbar	(Singapore) Balestier Khalsa	Free
18 September 2026	FW	(Timor-Leste) Vabio Canavaro	(Croatia) NK Kamen Podbablje (C3)	Free
SPL2, U23 & Academy
30 June 2026	DF	(Singapore) Danish Haqimi	(Singapore)	Free
30 June 2026	DF	(Singapore) Aiqel Aliman	(Singapore)	Free
30 June 2026	FW	(Singapore) Lim Kai Pin	(Singapore)	Free
30 June 2026	FW	(Singapore) Danny Ali	(Singapore)	Free
20 September 2026	DF	(Norway) (France) Nils Carballeira	(Singapore)	Free

Mid Season

Date (Note: Date of club's announcement, will be either date of club announcement or 1 Jun-2025, the date which the free agent start due to lapse of previous contract)	Position	Player	Transferred to	Ref
First team
SPL2, U23 & Academy

=== National Service ===
Preseason

Position	Player	Transferred To	Ref
DF	(Singapore) Farid Jafri	(Singapore) SAFSA	NS till Sept 2027
FW	(Singapore) Saiful Azhar Saifuddin	(Singapore) SAFSA	NS till Sept 2027
FW	(Singapore) Risvi Aaqil	(Singapore) SAFSA	NS till Sept 2027

=== Promoted ===
Preseason

Date	Position	Player	Remark	Ref
4 July 2025	GK	(Singapore) Ryan Effendy	1-year contract from Jul 2025 till Jun 2026	First professional contract
4 July 2025	GK	(Singapore) Hazwan Afiq	1-year contract from Jul 2025 till Jun 2026	First professional contract
4 July 2025	DF	(Singapore) Aiqel Aliman	1-year contract from Jul 2025 till Jun 2026	First professional contract
4 July 2025	FW	(Singapore) Saiful Azhar Saifuddin	1-year contract from Jul 2025 till Jun 2026	First professional contract
4 July 2025	FW	(Singapore) Risvi Aaqil	1-year contract from Jul 2025 till Jun 2026	First professional contract
11 August 2025	FW	(Singapore) Danny Ali	1-year contract from Jul 2025 till Jun 2026	First professional contract
31 August 2025	MF	(Singapore) Xuan Hui	1-year contract from Jul 2025 till Jun 2026	First professional contract
3 February 2026	FW	(Norway) Nils Carballeira	1-year contract from Feb 2026 till Jun 2026	First professional contract

=== Extension / Retained ===
Date	Position	Player	Ref
First team
1 July 2026	DF	(Singapore) Haziq Zulkifli	1-year contract from Aug 2026 till Jun 2027
1 July 2026	MF	(Croatia) (Italy) (Australia) Vinnie Ucchino	1-year contract from Aug 2026 till Jun 2027
1 July 2026	FW	(Singapore) Darius Lai Jyun Tang	1-year contract from Aug 2026 till Jun 2027
11 August 2026	GK	(Singapore) Kenji Syed Rusydi	1-year extension from Aug 2026 till Jun 2027
11 August 2026	DF	(Singapore) Syahrul Sazali	1-year extension from Aug 2026 till Jun 2027
12 August 2026	DF	(Singapore) Syed Akmal	1-year extension from Aug 2026 till Jun 2027
13 August 2026	MF	(Singapore) Fathullah Rahmat	1-year extension from Aug 2026 till Jun 2027
14 August 2026	MF	(Singapore) Anaqi Ismit	1-year extension from Aug 2026 till Jun 2027
14 August 2026	MF	(Singapore) Naqiuddin Eunos	1-year extension from Aug 2026 till Jun 2027
14 August 2026	MF	(Singapore) Samuel Pillai	1-year extension from Aug 2026 till Jun 2027

== Team statistics ==
=== Appearances and goals (SPL) ===
As of 21 November 26

Numbers in parentheses denote appearances as substitute.

No.	Pos.	Player	SPL		Singapore Cup		Total	
No.	Pos.	Player	Apps.	Goals	Apps.	Goals	Apps.	Goals
4	MF	(Singapore) Jared Gallagher	5+1	0	0	0	6	0
5	DF	(Singapore) Syed Akmal	0+1	0	0	0	1	0
6	DF	(Singapore) Madhu Mohana	3+1	0	0	0	4	0
7	MF	(Serbia) Lazar Vujanić	6	2	0	0	6	2
8	DF	(Japan) Yuki Aizu	3+2	1	0	0	5	1
9	FW	(Montenegro) Boris Kopitović	7	1	0	0	7	1
10	MF	(Japan) Masahiro Sugita	6	1	0	0	6	1
11	MF	(Japan) Riku Fukashiro	7	2	0	0	7	2
12	GK	(Singapore) Kenji Syed Rusydi	0	0	0	0	0	0
13	FW	(Singapore) Taufik Suparno	2+1	0	0	0	3	0
14	FW	(Singapore) Syahadat Masnawi	0	0	0	0	0	0
15	DF	(Singapore) Marcus Mosses	4+2	0	0	0	6	0
17	MF	(Singapore) Naqiuddin Eunos	4+3	1	0	0	7	1
18	DF	(Equatorial Guinea) (Spain) Alex Masogo	7	1	0	0	7	1
19	MF	(Singapore) Sam Pillay	0+3	0	0	0	3	0
20	DF	(Equatorial Guinea) (Spain) Marvin Anieboh	6	0	0	0	6	0
21	DF	(Singapore) Kieran Teo Jia Jun	6+1	0	0	0	7	0
22	DF	(Singapore) Syahrul Sazali	4+1	0	0	0	5	0
23	MF	(Singapore) Fathullah Rahmat	0+1	0	0	0	1	0
24	GK	(Singapore) Rudy Khairullah	0	0	0	0	0	0
26	DF	(Singapore) Haziq Zulkifli	0	0	0	0	0	0
27	GK	(China) Yue Liantian	0	0	0	0	0	0
28	FW	(Singapore) Zahil Rahman	0+3	0	0	0	3	0
29	FW	(Singapore) Risvi Aaqil	0	0	0	0	0	0
30	DF	(Singapore) Hafid Sohan Rifa'i	0	0	0	0	0	0
31	MF	(Singapore) Adly Irfan	0	0	0	0	0	0
32	FW	(Singapore) Shahreez Basheer	0	0	0	0	0	0
33	MF	(Singapore) Xia Zeyu	0	0	0	0	0	0
34	DF	(Singapore) (Malaysia) Deshan Gunasegara	0	0	0	0	0	0
35	FW	(Singapore) Lim Kai Pin	0	0	0	0	0	0
36	MF	(Singapore) Lucas Alessandro Yeo	0	0	0	0	0	0
37	DF	(Singapore) Daniyal Lynn Rasor	0	0	0	0	0	0
39	FW	(Singapore) Darius Lai	0+1	0	0	0	1	0
47	MF	(Croatia) (Italy) (Australia) Vinnie Ucchino	0	0	0	0	0	0
56	MF	(Philippines) Neil Charles Callanta	0	0	0	0	0	0
66	MF	(Singapore) Anaqi Ismit	0+2	0	0	0	2	0
70	MF	(Singapore) Lim Xuan Hui	0	0	0	0	0	0
72	GK	(Singapore) Travis Ang Jia Zheng	0	0	0	0	0	0
82	GK	(Spain) Aitor Mujica	7	0	0	0	7	0
Players who have played this season but had left on loan to other club
Players who have played this season but had left the club permanently for other club

== Competitions ==
=== Overview ===
Competition	Record							
Competition	P	W	D	L	GF	GA	GD	Win %

=== Singapore Premier League ===
Win Draw Loss

14 September 2026 1	Geylang International (Singapore)	1–0	(Singapore) Tanjong Pagar United	Tampines
	Kim Tae-uk 33'		Madhu Mohana (red card) 41'; Marvin Anieboh (red card) 55'; Jared Gallagher (yellow card) 80'; Miki Llado (yellow card) 80'; Alex Masogo (yellow card) 87'; Masahiro Sugita (yellow card) 90'	Stadium: Our Tampines Hub; Referee: Hilmi Fuad; Man of the Match: (South Korea) Kim Tae-uk

19 September 2026 2	Balestier Khalsa (Singapore)	3–4	(Singapore) Tanjong Pagar United	Bishan
	Bill Mamadou 7' (red card) 15'; Tin Matic 88'; Marin Kuzminski 90+1'; Jakov Katuša (yellow card) 27'; Fudhil I’yadh (yellow card) 38' (yellow-red card) 85'; Hiro Mizuguchi (yellow card) 90+12'		Yuki Aizu 35'; Lazar Vujanić 50', 56'; Boris Kopitović 90+13' (pen.); Alex Masogo (yellow card) 45+4'; Jared Gallagher (red card) 77'	Stadium: Bishan Stadium; Referee: Mazlan Pagira; Man of the Match: (Croatia) Lazar Vujanić

11 October 2026 3	Tanjong Pagar United (Singapore)	0–4	(Singapore) Tampines Rovers	Jurong East
	Jared Gallagher (yellow card) 54'; Syahrul Sazali (yellow card) 59'; Riku Fukashiro (yellow card) 73'	Report	Hide Higashikawa 63'; Yuma Kimura 86'; Seiga Sumi 89' (yellow card) 81'; Faris Ramli 90+3'; Jacob Mahler (yellow card) 49'	Stadium: Jurong East Stadium; Referee: Oswind Suriya; Man of the Match: (Japan) Hide Higashikawa

16 October 2026 4	Tanjong Pagar United (Singapore)	2–1	(Singapore) Hougang United	Jurong East
	Riku Fukashiro 55'; Alex Masogo 61'; Aitor Mujica (yellow card) 25'; Syahrul Sazali (yellow card) 84'		Washington Jaramillo 70' (yellow card) 4'; Lucas Cardoso (penalty missed) 25 (yellow card) 85'	Stadium: Jurong East Stadium; Referee: Thawfeek Ahamad; Man of the Match: (Equatorial Guinea) (Spain) Alex Masogo

25 October 2026 5	Lion City Sailors (Singapore)	6–0	(Singapore) Tanjong Pagar United	Jalan Besar
	Hugo Gomes 37'; Matthias Phaëton 60'; Antonio Mance 70', 90+3'; Giovanni Haag 86'; Hariss Harun 90+5'; Song Ui-young (yellow card) 46'		Kieran Teo Jia Jun (yellow card) 54'; Jared Gallagher (yellow card) 63'; Marvin Anieboh (yellow card) 78'; Lazar Vujanic (yellow card) 85'	Stadium: Jalan Besar Stadium; Referee: Syarqawi Buhari; Man of the Match: (Brazil) Hugo Gomes

30 October 2026 6	Tanjong Pagar United (Singapore)	1–1	(Singapore) FC Jurong	Jurong East
	Lee Jae-yong 90+10' (o.g.); Marcus Mosses (yellow card) 47'; Kieran Teo Jia Jun (yellow card) 61'; Jared Gallagher (yellow card) 90+4'		Seiya Satsukida 49'; Lee Jae-yong (yellow card) 37'; Riku Fukashiro (yellow card) 43'; Shunsuke Ono (red card) 81'; Firman Nabil (yellow card) 90+3'; Christopher van Huizen (yellow card) 90+5'	Stadium: Jurong East Stadium; Referee: Taufik Thana; Man of the Match: (Japan) Seiya Satsukida

21 November 2026 7	Young Lions (Singapore)	2–4	(Singapore) Tanjong Pagar United	Jalan Besar
	Miyu Sato 17'; Toi Kagami 38'		Naqiuddin Eunos 25'; Riku Fukashiro 30'; Boris Kopitovic 45+2' (pen.); Masahiro Sugita 68'	Stadium: Jalan Besar Stadium; Referee: Thawfeek Ahamad; Man of the Match: (Japan) Riku Fukashiro

27 November 2026 8	Geylang International (Singapore)	–	(Singapore) Tanjong Pagar United	Tampines
				Stadium: Our Tampines Hub

12 February 2027 9	Tanjong Pagar United (Singapore)	–	(Singapore) Balestier Khalsa	Jurong East
				Stadium: Jurong East Stadium

19 February 2027 10	Hougang United (Singapore)	–	(Singapore) Tanjong Pagar United	Bishan
				Stadium: Bishan Stadium

28 February 2027 11	Tampines Rovers (Singapore)	–	(Singapore) Tanjong Pagar United	Tampines
				Stadium: Our Tampines Hub

7 March 2027 12	Tanjong Pagar United (Singapore)	–	(Singapore) Young Lions	Jurong East
				Stadium: Jurong East Stadium

12 March 2027 13	FC Jurong (Singapore)	–	(Singapore) Tanjong Pagar United	Jurong East
				Stadium: Jurong East Stadium

24 January 2027 14 (Rescheduled)	Tanjong Pagar United (Singapore)	–	(Singapore) Lion City Sailors	Jurong East
				Stadium: Jurong East Stadium

4 April 2027 15	Tampines Rovers (Singapore)	–	(Singapore) Tanjong Pagar United	Tampines
				Stadium: Our Tampines Hub

29 January 2027 16 (Rescheduled)	Tanjong Pagar United (Singapore)	–	(Singapore) Hougang United	Jurong East
				Stadium: Jurong East Stadium

16 April 2027 17	Balestier Khalsa (Singapore)	–	(Singapore) Tanjong Pagar United	Bishan
				Stadium: Bishan Stadium

24 April 2027 18	Tanjong Pagar United (Singapore)	–	(Singapore) Geylang International	Jurong East
				Stadium: Jurong East Stadium

2 May 2027 19	Young Lions (Singapore)	–	(Singapore) Tanjong Pagar United	Jalan Besar
				Stadium: Jalan Besar Stadium

8 May 2027 20	Tanjong Pagar United (Singapore)	–	(Singapore) FC Jurong	Jurong East
				Stadium: Jurong East Stadium

15 May 2027 21	Tanjong Pagar United (Singapore)	–	(Singapore) Lion City Sailors	Jurong East
				Stadium: Jurong East Stadium

Pos	Teams	Pld	W	D	L	GF	GA	GD	Pts
1	Lion City Sailors	6	5	1	0	25	3	+22	16
2	Tampines Rovers	6	5	1	0	18	3	+15	16
3	Geylang International	7	4	2	1	12	7	+5	14
4	FC Jurong	7	3	1	3	14	11	+3	10
5	Tanjong Pagar United	7	3	1	3	11	18	−7	10
6	Balestier Khalsa	7	2	1	4	9	15	−6	7
7	Young Lions (Note: Young Lions are not eligible to represent Singapore in AFC club competitions.)	7	1	0	6	8	25	−17	3
8	Hougang United	7	0	1	6	4	19	−15	1

Updated to match(es) played on 22 November 2026. Source: Singapore Premier League
Rules for classification: 1) Points; 2) goal difference; 3) goals scored; 4) wins

== Competition (SPL2) ==
Win Draw Loss

25 August 2026 1	Lion City Sailors (Singapore)	1–4	(Singapore) Tanjong Pagar United	Jurong East
	Jasper Chen 90'; Tyler Tan (yellow card) 28'		Boris Kopitović 2', 45+1', 66'; Taufik Suparno 7'	Stadium: Jurong East Stadium

30 August 2026 2	Tanjong Pagar United (Singapore)	1–1	(Singapore) FC Jurong	Jurong East
	Marvin Anieboh 45+1'; Boris Kopitović (yellow card) 5'; Marcus Mosses (yellow card) 46'; Taufik Suparno (yellow card) 52'; Syed Akmal (yellow card) 76'; Samuel Pillai (yellow card) 77'	Report	Toa Suenaga 45+1'; Seo Seung-woo (yellow card) 5'; Akram Azman (yellow card) 21'; Christopher van Huizen (yellow card) 65'; Takuma Yamaguchi (yellow card) 88'	Stadium: Jurong East Stadium

2 September 2026 3	Tanjong Pagar United (Singapore)	0–8	(Singapore) Young Lions	Jurong East
	Daniyal Lynn Rasor (yellow card) 67'; Anaqee Basheer (yellow card) 80'		Hisatoshi Nishido 5'; Louka Tan 8', 37', 40', 42', 90+2'; Toi Kagami 17'; Fairuz Fazli 25'	Stadium: Jurong East Stadium

7 September 2026 4	Balestier Khalsa (Singapore)	2–1	(Singapore) Tanjong Pagar United	Jurong East
	Syafi Hilman 62'; Adam Faisal 64'		Lim Xuan Hui 40' (yellow card) 79'; Loukas Ng (yellow card) 55'; Irfan Mika'il (yellow card) 71'	Stadium: Jurong East Stadium

19 October 2026 5	Tampines Rovers (Singapore)	5–2	(Singapore) Tanjong Pagar United	Jurong East
	Yuma Kimura (??); Kenshin Yamazaki (??); Naberu (??); (??)			Stadium: Jurong East Stadium

6 November 2026 6	Tanjong Pagar United (Singapore)	0–7	(Singapore) Geylang International	Jurong East
				Stadium: Jurong East Stadium

5 December 2026 7	Tanjong Pagar United (Singapore)	–	(Singapore) Hougang United	Jurong East
				Stadium: Jurong East Stadium

13 December 2026 8	Lion City Sailors (Singapore)	–	(Singapore) Tanjong Pagar United	Bedok
				Stadium: Bedok Stadium

16 December 2026 9	FC Jurong (Singapore)	–	(Singapore) Tanjong Pagar United	Jurong East
				Stadium: Jurong East Stadium

20 December 2026 10	Tanjong Pagar United (Singapore)	–	(Singapore) Young Lions	Jurong East
				Stadium: Jurong East Stadium

5 January 2027 11	Tanjong Pagar United (Singapore)	–	(Singapore) Balestier Khalsa	Jurong East
				Stadium: Jurong East Stadium

8 January 2027 12	Tanjong Pagar United (Singapore)	–	(Singapore) Tampines Rovers	Tampines
				Stadium: Our Tampines Hub

12 January 2027 13	Geylang International (Singapore)	–	(Singapore) Tanjong Pagar United	Bedok
				Stadium: Bedok Stadium

16 January 2027 14	Tanjong Pagar United (Singapore)	–	(Singapore) Hougang United	Jurong East
				Stadium: Jurong East Stadium

20 January 2027 15	Tanjong Pagar United (Singapore)	–	(Singapore) Lion City Sailors	Choa Chu Kang
				Stadium: Choa Chu Kang Stadium

24 January 2027 16	FC Jurong (Singapore)	–	(Singapore) Tanjong Pagar United	Jurong East
				Stadium: Jurong East Stadium

30 January 2027 17	Young Lions (Singapore)	–	(Singapore) Tanjong Pagar United	Jurong East
				Stadium: Jurong East Stadium

3 February 2027 18	Tanjong Pagar United (Singapore)	–	(Singapore) Balestier Khalsa	Jurong East
				Stadium: Jurong East Stadium

22 February 2027 19	Tanjong Pagar United (Singapore)	–	(Singapore) Tampines Rovers	Bukit Gombak
				Stadium: Bukit Gombak Stadium

1 March 2027 20	Geylang International (Singapore)	–	(Singapore) Tanjong Pagar United	Bedok
				Stadium: Bedok Stadium

5 April 2027 21	Hougang United (Singapore)	–	(Singapore) Tanjong Pagar United	Bukit Gombak
				Stadium: Bukit Gombak Stadium

Pos	Team	Pld	W	D	L	GF	GA	GD	Pts	Qualification or relegation
1	Geylang International II	6	5	0	1	19	2	+17	15	Champion
2	Balestier Khalsa II	6	4	1	1	10	7	+3	13	
3	Tampines Rovers II	5	4	0	1	18	5	+13	12	
4	Young Lions B	3	2	0	1	10	7	+3	6	
5	FC Jurong II	5	1	1	3	11	12	−1	4	
6	Hougang United II	5	1	1	3	5	13	−8	4	
7	Tanjong Pagar United II	6	1	1	4	8	24	−16	4	
8	Lion City Sailors II	6	1	0	5	7	18	−11	3	

First match(es) will be played: 6 November 2026. Source: Singapore Premier League 2
Rules for classification: 1) points; 2) goal difference; 3) number of goals scored; 4) number of wins
