= 2004 S.League =

Singapore Pro League season

S. League
- Season: 2004
- Champions: Tampines Rovers; 1st S.League title
- AFC Cup: Tampines Rovers (S.League and Singapore Cup winners); Home United (S.League runners-up)
- Matches played: 135
- Goals scored: 513 (3.8 per match)
- Top goalscorer: Egmar Goncalves (30)
- Biggest home win: Tampines Rovers 9-0 Tanjong Pagar United (16 March 2004)
- Biggest away win: Balestier Khalsa 0-6 Tanjong Pagar United (19 August 2004)
- Highest scoring: Singapore Armed Forces 6-6 Young Lions (15 April 2004)

2004 S.League was the ninth season of Singapore's professional football league. It was won by Tampines Rovers, which was their first league title.

== Changes from 2003 ==
- Penalty kicks after draws were discontinued.
- Albirex Niigata (S) are the feeder team of J.League club Albirex Niigata.
- Sengkang Marine withdrew from the league at the end of 2003 season.

== Foreign players ==
Each club is allowed to have up to a maximum of 4 foreign players.

Club	Player 1	Player 2	Player 3	Player 4	Former Player
Balestier Khalsa	(South Korea) Kim Chan-joong	(South Korea) Park Tae-won	(Australia) Andrew Durante	(Nigeria) Igwe Iroha	(South Korea) Hea Sae-gyu (South Korea) Lee Ho-sung
Geylang International	(Australia) Aleksandar Đurić	(Republic of Ireland) Wayne O'Sullivan	(England) Mark Williams	(Scotland) Stewart Petrie	(England) Daniel Hill (Australia) Aleksandar Đurić (China) Chang Hui
Home United	(Thailand) Sutee Suksomkit	(Thailand) Surachai Jaturapattarapong	(Thailand) Anurak Srikerd	(Brazil) Peres De Oliveira	None
Tanjong Pagar United	(Guinea) Ballamodou Conde	(Réunion) Gimmy Bade	(France) Jean-Marc Audemar	(France) Benoît Salviat	(Senegal) Nicodeme Boucher
SAFFC	(Australia) Jon Angelucci	(Croatia) Nenad Baćina	(Guinea) Boubacar Keita	(Germany) André Gumprecht	(Guinea) Ballamodou Conde
Tampines Rovers	(Thailand) Santi Chaiyaphurk	(Thailand) Choketawee Promrut	(Serbia and Montenegro) Sead Muratović	(Serbia and Montenegro) Fahrudin Mustafić	(Kyrgyzstan) Zakir Jalilov
Woodlands	(South Korea) Park Kung-guy	(South Korea) Kim Eun-cher	(England) Simon Clark	(England) John Wilkinson	None
(Singapore) Young Lions FC	(China) Shi Jiayi	(Serbia) Vladan Seric	(Nigeria) Precious Emuejeraye	None	(Nigeria) Kazeem Babatunde

- Albirex Niigata (S) and Sinchi FC are not allowed to hire any foreigners.

== League table ==
Pos	Team	Pld	W	D	L	GF	GA	GD	Pts	Qualification
1	Tampines Rovers	27	20	3	4	76	29	+47	63	Qualification to AFC Cup Group Stage
2	Home United	27	17	2	8	76	43	+33	53	Qualification to AFC Cup Group Stage
3	(Singapore) Young Lions	27	14	5	8	74	52	+22	47	
4	Singapore Armed Forces	27	14	3	10	45	48	−3	45	
5	(Japan) Albirex Niigata (S)	27	12	8	7	50	42	+8	44	
6	Woodlands Wellington	27	12	4	11	48	49	−1	40	
7	Geylang United	27	10	7	10	43	43	0	37	
8	Balestier Khalsa	27	6	2	19	36	73	−37	20	
9	(China) Sinchi FC	27	4	5	18	36	62	−26	17	
10	Tanjong Pagar United	27	4	5	18	29	72	−43	17	

Source: RSSSF
Rules for classification: 1) points; 2) goal difference; 3) number of goals scored

== Top scorers ==
Rank	Name	Club	Goals
1	(Brazil) Egmar Goncalves	Home United	30
2	(Nigeria) Agu Casmir	Young Lions	24
3	(Croatia) Mirko Grabovac	Singapore Armed Forces	23
4	Indra Sahdan Daud	Home United	19
5	(South Korea) Park Kung Guy	Woodlands Wellington	18
