= 2026–27 FC Jurong season =

Jurong
2026–27 season
- Chairman: Daisuke Korenaga
- Head coach: Keiji Shigetomi
- Stadium: Jurong East Stadium
Home colours	Away colours

The 2026–27 season is FC Jurong's 23rd consecutive season in the top flight of Singapore football (Singapore Premier League), having joined in 2004. Along with the 2026–27 Singapore Premier League, the club also compete in the Singapore Cup. In April 2026, the club made a further announcement about the new name FC Jurong. The club most notably signed Japanese player Keisuke Honda.

== Squad ==
=== Singapore Premier League ===
As of 10 April 2026

Squad no.	Name	Nationality	Date of birth (age)	Previous club	Contract start	Contract end
Goalkeepers
1	Lee Jin-woo	(South Korea)	14 March 2003 (age 23)	(Japan) Kamatamare Sanuki	2026	2027
18	Hassan Sunny	(Singapore)	2 April 1984 (age 42)	(Singapore) Lion City Sailors	2023	2027
25	Firman Nabil	(Singapore)	27 March 2005 (age 21)	(Japan) Young Lions	2026	2027
31	Eizlan Haiqal Herman	(Singapore)	25 July 2005 (age 21)	(Singapore) Albirex Niigata (S) U21	2024	2026
40	Danysh Basir	(Singapore)	9 March 2007 (age 19)	(Singapore) Albirex Niigata (S) U21	2025	2026
41	Iskandar Abdul Latiff	(Singapore)	23 July 2007 (age 19)	(Singapore) Albirex Niigata (S) U19	2026	2027
61	Kaidan Rune Ferrell	(Singapore)	22 September 2008 (age 18)	(Singapore) Balestier Khalsa U17	2026	2026
71	Noor Aydrin	(Singapore)	25 March 2008 (age 18)	(Singapore) Albirex Niigata (S) U17	2025	2026
81	Aqeel Salleh	(Singapore)	26 July 2008 (age 18)	(Singapore) East Coast United U17	2026	2026
Defenders
2	Kim Yoon-sik	(South Korea)	21 July 2003 (age 23)	(Japan) FC Osaka	2026	2027
3	Shunsuke Ono	(Japan)	16 February 2005 (age 21)	(Japan) Oita Trinita	2026	2027
5	Seo Seung-woo	(South Korea)	18 November 2002 (age 24)	(South Korea) Gyeongju KHNP	2026	2027
19	Akram Azman	(Singapore)	21 November 2000 (age 26)	(Singapore) Lion City Sailors	2026	2027
20	Sim Jun Yen	(Singapore)	28 September 2007 (age 19)	(Singapore) Albirex Niigata (S) U21	2023	2027
21	Rauf Anaqi	(Singapore)	6 March 2008 (age 18)	(Singapore) Young Lions	2024	2027
23	Delwinder Singh	(Singapore)	5 August 1992 (age 34)	Singapore Khalsa Association	2025	2027
24	Andrew Aw	(Singapore)	29 March 2003 (age 23)	(Singapore) Young Lions	2026	2027
26	Aneeq Fairus	(Singapore)	9 June 2007 (age 19)	(Singapore) Albirex Niigata (S) U21	2023	2027
27	Ahmad Martin Roslan	(Singapore)	6 August 2008 (age 18)	(Singapore) Albirex Niigata (S) U21	2024	2027
32	Christopher van Huizen	(Singapore)	28 November 1992 (age 33)	(Singapore) Lion City Sailors	2026	2027
33	Aqil Zafri Junaidi	(Singapore)	6 October 2007 (age 19)	(Singapore) Albirex Niigata (S) U21	2024	2027
34	Arsyad Arzain	(Singapore)	22 February 2007 (age 19)	(Singapore) Albirex Niigata (S) U21	2023	2027
35	Sachin Kabilan Chandra	(Singapore)	24 January 2007 (age 19)	(Singapore) Albirex Niigata (S) U21	2023	2027
36	Dani Qalish	(Singapore)	20 May 2008 (age 18)	(Singapore) Lion City Sailors U17	2025	2026
37	Khaalish Aaqil Noorhaslan	(Singapore)	26 March 2007 (age 19)	(Singapore) Albirex Niigata (S) U21	2024	2026
45	Lee Jae-yong	(South Korea)	21 May 2003 (age 23)	(South Korea) Chuncheon FC	2026	2027
62	Tom Bradley	(England)	3 May 2009 (age 17)	Hong Kong FC Youth	2026	2026
63	Evan Teo Zuo Quan	(Singapore)	25 October 2007 (age 19)	(Singapore) BG Tampines Rovers U17	2026	2026
64	Wirth Kaylan	(Singapore) (Germany)	9 October 2008 (age 18)	(Singapore) Albirex Niigata (S) U15	2026	2026
67	Derric Luke Kumar	(Singapore)	20 June 2009 (age 17)	(Singapore) Albirex Niigata (S) U17	2023	2026
69	Yap Ho Wai	(Singapore)	15 May 2007 (age 19)	(Singapore) Republic Polytechnic	2026	2026
70	Sachin Sajeev	(Singapore)	20 February 2008 (age 18)	(Singapore) Albirex Niigata (S) U17	2025	2026
72	Rowan Shah	(Singapore)	16 March 2009 (age 17)	(Singapore) Hougang United U17	2026	2026
79	Xantos Jacobus	(Philippines)	21 January 2008 (age 18)	(Singapore) Albirex Niigata (S) U17	2025	2026
	Nozomi Ozawa	(Japan)	16 February 2003 (age 23)	(Japan) Ryutsu Keizai University	2024	2026
	Aydin Zufayri Putra	(Singapore)	7 September 2008 (age 18)	(Singapore) Albirex Niigata (S) U17	2026	2026
Midfielders
6	Yuma Tsuzurabara	(Japan)	14 September 2006 (age 20)	(Japan) Setagaya United	2026	2027
7	Seiya Satsukida	(Japan)	18 April 2002 (age 24)	(Japan) Tegevajaro Miyazaki	2026	2027
8	Kodai Dohi	(Japan)	13 April 2001 (age 25)	(Japan) FC Osaka	2026	2027
10	Takuma Yamaguchi	(Japan)	20 October 1998 (age 28)	(Malta) Naxxar Lions (M1)	2026	2027
14	Jaden Heng	(Singapore)	10 November 2008 (age 18)	(Singapore) Albirex Niigata (S) U21	2024	2027
15	Syed Firdaus Hassan	(Singapore)	30 May 1998 (age 28)	(Singapore) BG Tampines Rovers	2024	2027
22	Nicky Melvin Singh	(Singapore) (Philippines)	13 June 2002 (age 24)	(Singapore) SAFSA	2021	2027
28	Aloysius Pang	(Singapore)	22 April 2004 (age 22)	(Singapore) Tanjong Pagar United	2026	2027
38	Izz Anaqi	(Singapore)	17 August 2002 (age 24)	(Singapore) Lion City Sailors	2026	2027
42	Haziq Kamarudin	(Singapore)	6 March 2001 (age 25)	(Singapore) Young Lions	2024	2027
65	Derek Man Ruiqi	(Singapore)	30 March 2010 (age 16)	(Singapore) Hougang United U21	2026	2027
73	Lucas Lee Cheng Qi	(Singapore)	5 November 2007 (age 19)	(Singapore) Hougang United U21	2026	2027
75	Santiago Rodrigues	(Portugal)	21 December 2007 (age 18)	Singapore Football Club	2026	2027
80	Zakaria Saadullah	(Singapore)	12 August 2008 (age 18)	Singapore American School	2026	2027
84	Shaun Shaik	(Singapore)	3 October 2008 (age 18)	(Singapore) Albirex Niigata (S) U19	2026	2027
	Angelo Joachim	(Singapore) (Australia)	11 December 2009 (age 16)	(Australia) Williams Landing FC	2026	2027
Forwards
4	Keisuke Honda	(Japan)	13 June 1986 (age 40)	(Bhutan) Paro FC	2026	2027
9	Mizuki Ando	(Japan)	19 July 1999 (age 27)	(Japan) Mito HollyHock	2026	2027
11	Toa Suenaga	(Japan)	13 October 2005 (age 21)	(Japan) Renofa Yamaguchi	2026	2027
16	Liska Haaziq Iskandar	(Singapore)	30 April 2007 (age 19)	(Singapore) Albirex Niigata (S) U21	2023	2027
17	Helmi Shahrol	(Singapore)	31 July 2008 (age 18)	(Singapore) Albirex Niigata (S) U21	2023	2027
30	Shakthi Vinayagavijayan	(Singapore)	28 May 2003 (age 23)	(Singapore) SAFSA	2022	2027
39	Tyler Matthew Ho Zheng Yu	(Singapore)	1 November 2007 (age 19)	(Singapore) Young Lions	2026	2027
66	Danish Haikal	(Singapore)	1 October 2008 (age 18)	(Singapore) Lion City Sailors U17	2026	2027
74	Omar Asad Barnwell	(Singapore) (Australia)	25 April 2008 (age 18)	(Singapore) ANZA	2026	2027
76	Carlos David Rocha	(Spain)	4 October 2008 (age 18)	(Singapore)	2026	2027
77	Aidil Abdullah	(Singapore)	8 October 2008 (age 18)	(Singapore) Tanjong Pagar U17	2026	2027
78	Aidan Pottschul	(United States) (Singapore)	9 July 2009 (age 17)	(Singapore) Turf City	2026	2027
82	Pradeep Eraaman	(Singapore)	26 March 2008 (age 18)	(Singapore) Albirex Niigata U17	2026	2027
83	Lutfyl Hady	(Singapore)	16 August 2008 (age 18)	(Singapore) Albirex Niigata U17	2025	2027
37	Chen Yang Yi	(Singapore)		(Singapore) Albirex Niigata (S) U21	2025	2027
44	Hazeem Bakre	(England)	19 October 2005 (age 21)	(England) Middlesbrough U21	2026	2027
Players who left club on loan during season
2	Junki Kenn Yoshimura	(Singapore) (Japan)	20 July 2004 (age 22)	(Singapore) Albirex Niigata (S) U21	2021	2026
Players who left club for NS during season
54	Kenji Austin	(Singapore) (Japan)	24 February 2004 (age 22)	(Singapore) Active SG	2020	2025
Players who left club during season

== Coaching staff ==
First team

Position	Name
Team manager	(Singapore) Hafizuddin Hanuar
Technical director	(Japan) Keiji Shigetomi
Head coach (men)	(Singapore) Jaswinder Singh
Head coach (women)	(Japan) Kana Kitahara
Assistant coach (men)	(Singapore) Nas Nastain (Japan) Hiroaki Nagamine (Japan) Nozomi Ikarashi (Japan) Yahiro Saito
Assistant coach (women)	(Japan) Yuki Monden
Goalkeeper coach (men)	(Singapore) Fadhil Salim
Goalkeeper coach (women)	(Singapore) Bryan Quek
Fitness coach (men)	(Singapore) Mark Friedrich Anthony
Sports trainer	(Japan) Haruka Kondo
Physiotherapist	(Singapore) Karen Koh
Analyst	(Singapore) Shaun Tan
Kitman	(Singapore) Roy Krishnan (Malaysia) Herman Pelani
Interpreter	(Japan) Masayuki Kato

Academy

Position	Name
Head of youth	
SPL 2 head coach	(Singapore) Jaswinder Singh
Under-19 head coach	
Under-17 head coach	
Under-15 head coach	(Japan) Masayuki Kato
Under-13 head coach	(Singapore) Nas Nastain
Goalkeeper coach (under-21)	(Singapore) Wan Shaifulrezza Bin Shes
Goalkeeper coach (under-17)	(Singapore) Hyrulnizam Juma'at
Goalkeeper coach (under-15)	(Singapore) Fadhilah Hassan
Under-21 fitness coach	(Singapore) Sufian
Under-21 trainer	(Singapore) Xin Yu

== Transfers ==
=== In ===
Preseason

Date (Note: Date of club's announcement)	Position	Player	Transferred from	Ref
First team
10 April 2026	FW	(Japan) Keisuke Honda	Free agent	N/A
29 May 2026	DF	(Singapore) Akram Azman	(Singapore) Lion City Sailors	Free
24 June 2026	DF	(Japan) Kodai Dohi	(Japan) FC Osaka	Free
24 June 2026	DF	(South Korea) Kim Yoon-sik	(Japan) FC Osaka	Season loan
26 June 2026	FW	(Japan) Toa Suenaga	(Japan) Renofa Yamaguchi	Season loan
27 June 2026	MF	(Japan) Seiya Satsukida	(Japan) Tegevajaro Miyazaki	Free
27 June 2026	MF	(Japan) Takuma Yamaguchi	(Malta) Naxxar Lions	Free
27 June 2026	DF	(Singapore) Christopher van Huizen	(Singapore) Lion City Sailors	Free
28 June 2026	MF	(Japan) Yuma Tsuzurabara	(Japan) Setagaya United	Free
29 June 2026	GK	(South Korea) Lee Jin-woo	(Japan) FC Osaka	Free
1 July 2026	MF	(Singapore) Izz Anaqi	(Singapore) Lion City Sailors	Free
1 July 2026	FW	(Singapore) Tyler Matthew Ho Zheng Yu	(Singapore) Lion City Sailors	Free
2 July 2026	DF	(Japan) Shunsuke Ono	(Japan) Oita Trinita	Season loan
4 July 2026	DF	(Singapore) Andrew Aw	(Singapore) Tampines Rovers	Free
8 July 2026	MF	(Singapore) Aloysius Pang	(Singapore) Tanjong Pagar United	Free
12 July 2026	DF	(South Korea) Seo Seung-woo	(South Korea) Gyeongju KHNP	Free
22 July 2026	FW	(Japan) Mizuki Ando	Free agent	N/A
30 July 2026	GK	(Singapore) Firman Nabil	(Singapore) SAFSA	End of NS
1 September 2026	DF	(South Korea) Lee Jae-yong	(South Korea) Chuncheon FC	Free
16 October 2026	FW	(England) Hazeem Bakre	(England) Middlesbrough U21	Free
SPL2, U23 & Academy
1 July 2026	DF	(Singapore) Rauf Anaqi	(Singapore) Young Lions	End of loan

=== Out ===
Preseason

Date (Note: Date of club's announcement, else will be 1 Jun-2025, the date which the free agent start due to lapse of previous contract)	Position	Player	Transferred to	Ref
First team
31 May 2026	MF	(Japan) Ren Nishimura	(Japan) V-Varen Nagasaki (J2)	End of loan
31 May 2026	MF	(Japan) Katsuyuki Ishibashi	(Japan) FC Osaka (J3)	End of loan
31 May 2026	DF	(Singapore) Zulqarnaen Suzliman	(Singapore) Lion City Sailors	End of loan
31 May 2026	FW	(Singapore) (Nigeria) Abdul Rasaq	(Singapore) Lion City Sailors	End of loan
16 June 2026	FW	(Japan) Shingo Nakano	(Austria) SCR Altach (A1)	Free
18 June 2026	MF	(Japan) Takumi Yokohata	(Japan) FC Baleine Shimonoseki	Free
20 June 2026	DF	(North Korea) (Japan) Kim Tae-uk	(Singapore) Geylang International	Free
20 June 2026	FW	(North Korea) (Japan) Ryang Hyon-ju	(Singapore) Geylang International	Free
21 June 2026	GK	(Singapore) Dylan Pereira	(Singapore) Geylang International	Free
21 June 2026	DF	(South Korea) Cho Eun-su	(Singapore) Geylang International	Free
21 June 2026	MF	(Japan) Naoki Yoshioka	(Singapore) Geylang International	Free
22 June 2026	GK	(Japan) Takahiro Koga	(Singapore) Hougang United	Free
24 June 2026	DF	(Singapore) Daniel Martens	(United States) Austin	Free
24 June 2026	MF	(Singapore) Danish Qayyum	(Singapore)	Free
24 June 2026	FW	(Singapore) Syukri Bashir	(Singapore)	Free
30 June 2026	FW	(Japan) Soshi Kadowaki	(Mongolia) Broncos FC	Free
7 July 2026	DF	(Japan) Komei Iida	(Japan)	Free
SPL2, U23 & Academy
31 May 2026	DF	(Singapore) Rauf Anaqi	(Singapore) Young Lions	Season loan
1 July 2026	MF	(Singapore) Jarrel Ong Jia Wei	(Singapore) Hougang United	Free
1 July 2026	FW	(Singapore) Ashvin Vela	(Singapore) Hougang United	Free

=== National services ===
Preseason

Date (Note: Date of club's announcement, else 1 June, due to lapse of previous contract)	Position	Player	Transferred to	Ref
First team
14 August 2025	DF	(Singapore) (Japan) Junki Kenn Yoshimura	(Singapore) SAFSA	NS till July 2027
SPL2, U23 & Academy
January 2025	GK	(Singapore) Jeremy Quan	(Singapore) SAFSA	NS till December 2026
March 2025	DF	(Singapore) (Japan) Kenji Austin	(Singapore) SAFSA	NS till March 2027

=== Retained / extension / promoted ===
Date (Note: Date of club's announcement)	Position	Player	Ref
First team
18 October 2025	DF	(Singapore) Sim Jun Yen	2 years contract till 2028
18 October 2025	MF	(Singapore) Jaden Heng	2 years contract till 2028
7 January 2026	GK	(Singapore) Hassan Sunny	2 years contract till 2028
22 June 2026	GK	(Singapore) Iskandar Latif	
22 June 2026	DF	(Singapore) Sachin Chandra	
22 June 2026	DF	(Singapore) Aneeq Fairus	
22 June 2026	DF	(Singapore) Ahmad Martin	
22 June 2026	DF	(Singapore) Arsyad Azrain	
22 June 2026	MF	(Singapore) Aqil Zafri	
22 June 2026	FW	(Singapore) Liska Haaziq	
22 June 2026	FW	(Singapore) Helmi Shahrol	
25 June 2026	MF	(Singapore) Haziq Kamarudin	1 year contract till June 2027
25 June 2026	MF	(Singapore) (Philippines) Nicky Melvin Singh	1 year contract till June 2027
26 June 2026	DF	(Singapore) Delwinder Singh	1 year contract till June 2027
26 June 2026	MF	(Singapore) Syed Firdaus	1 year contract till June 2027
28 June 2025	DF	(Japan) Komei Iida	1 year contract till June 2027
29 June 2025	FW	(Singapore) Shakthi Vinayagavijayan	1 year contract till June 2027
21 June 2025	DF	(Singapore) (Japan) Junki Kenn Yoshimura	1 year contract till June 2026 (Note: Junki left for NS after signing contract)
27 June 2025	DF	(Japan) Nozomi Ozawa	1 year contract till June 2026

== Pre-season ==
Win Draw Loss

7 August 2026 1	FC Jurong (Singapore)	4–0	(Singapore) Jungfrau Punggol	Jurong East
				Stadium: Jurong East Stadium

15 August 2026 76th Governance Cup Semi Final	Melaka F.C. (Malaysia)	2–1	(Singapore) FC Jurong	Malacca
	Mahalli Jasuli 68'; Abdul Azim Rahim 82'		Toa Suenaga 40'	Stadium: Hang Jebat

17 August 2026 76th Governance Cup 3rd/4th place	Persik Kediri (Indonesia)	0–1	(Singapore) FC Jurong	Malacca
			Takuma Yamaguchi 88' (pen.)	Stadium: Hang Jebat Stadium

4 September 2026 4	Tanjong Pagar United (Singapore)	0–0	(Singapore) FC Jurong	Jurong East
				Stadium: Jurong East Stadium

3 October 2026 5	FC Jurong (Singapore)	3–2	(Singapore) FC Jurong	Jurong East
		Report		Stadium: Jurong East Stadium

== Team statistics ==
=== Appearances and goals ===
@20 Nov 2026

No.	Pos.	Player	SPL		Singapore Cup		Total	
No.	Pos.	Player	Apps.	Goals	Apps.	Goals	Apps.	Goals
1	DF	(South Korea) Lee Jin-woo	0	0	0	0	0	0
2	DF	(South Korea) Kim Yoon-sik	7	0	0	0	7	0
3	DF	(Japan) Shunsuke Ono	2+1	1	0	0	3	1
4	FW	(Japan) Keisuke Honda	0+6	0	0	0	6	0
5	DF	(South Korea) Seo Seung-woo	5	1	0	0	5	1
6	MF	(Japan) Yuma Tsuzurabara	7	0	0	0	7	0
7	MF	(Japan) Seiya Satsukida	7	2	0	0	7	2
8	MF	(Japan) Kodai Dohi	3+3	1	0	0	6	1
9	FW	(Japan) Mizuki Ando	4+3	1	0	0	7	1
10	MF	(Japan) Takuma Yamaguchi	2+4	1	0	0	6	1
11	FW	(Japan) Toa Suenaga	5+2	2	0	0	7	2
14	MF	(Singapore) Jaden Heng	0	0	0	0	0	0
15	MF	(Singapore) Syed Firdaus Hassan	3+1	0	0	0	4	0
16	FW	(Singapore) Liska Haaziq Iskandar	0	0	0	0	0	0
17	FW	(Singapore) Helmi Shahrol	0	0	0	0	0	0
18	GK	(Singapore) Hassan Sunny	7	0	0	0	7	0
19	DF	(Singapore) Akram Azman	4	1	0	0	4	1
20	DF	(Singapore) Sim Jun Yen	2+3	0	0	0	5	0
22	MF	(Singapore) (Philippines) Nicky Melvin Singh	0	0	0	0	0	0
23	DF	(Singapore) Delwinder Singh	0	0	0	0	0	0
24	DF	(Singapore) Andrew Aw	2+3	1	0	0	5	1
25	GK	(Singapore) Firman Nabil	0+1	0	0	0	1	0
26	DF	(Singapore) Aneeq Fairus	0+2	0	0	0	2	0
27	DF	(Singapore) Ahmad Martin Roslan	0	0	0	0	0	0
28	FW	(Singapore) Aloysius Pang	0	0	0	0	0	0
30	FW	(Singapore) Shakthi Vinayagavijayan	0+2	0	0	0	2	0
31	GK	(Singapore) Eizlan Haiqal Herman	0	0	0	0	0	0
32	DF	(Singapore) Christopher van Huizen	4+1	0	0	0	5	0
33	DF	(Singapore) Aqil Zafri Junaidi	0	0	0	0	0	0
34	DF	(Singapore) Arsyad Arzain	0	0	0	0	0	0
36	DF	(Singapore) Dani Qalish	0	0	0	0	0	0
37	DF	(Singapore) Khaalish Aaqil Noorhaslan	0	0	0	0	0	0
39	FW	(Singapore) Tyler Ho	1+1	1	0	0	2	1
42	MF	(Singapore) Haziq Kamarudin	5	1	0	0	5	1
44	FW	(England) Hazeem Bakre	0+1	0	0	0	1	0
45	DF	(South Korea) Lee Jae-yong	7	1	0	0	7	1
Players who have played this season but had left on loan to other club
2	DF	(Singapore) (Japan) Junki Kenn Yoshimura	0	0	0	0	0	0
21	MF	(Singapore) Rauf Anaqi	0	0	0	0	0	0
	DF	(Japan) Nozomi Ozawa	0	0	0	0	0	0
Players who have played this season but had left the club

== Competitions ==
=== Singapore Premier League ===
Win Draw Loss

13 September 2026 1	Young Lions (Singapore)	0–4	(Singapore) FC Jurong	Jalan Besar
		Report	Toa Suenaga 15', 45+1'; Andrew Aw 81'; Shunsuke Ono 86'; Seo Seung-woo (yellow card) 5'; Lee Jae-yong (yellow card) 42'; Kodai Dohi (yellow card) 90+1'	Stadium: Jalan Besar Stadium; Referee: Syarqawi Buhari; Man of the Match: (Japan) Toa Suenaga

18 September 2026 2	FC Jurong (Singapore)	3–0	(Singapore) Hougang United	Jurong East
	Takuma Yamaguchi 23'; Haziq Kamarudin 45+7'; Mizuki Ando 73'; Kim Yoon-sik (yellow card) 83'; Andrew Aw (yellow card) 84'		Saifullah Akbar (yellow card) 45+2'; Zulqarnaen Suzliman (red card) 77'	Stadium: Jurong East Stadium; Referee: Jansen Foo; Man of the Match: (Japan) Seiya Satsukida

10 October 2026 3	Geylang International (Singapore)	3–1	(Singapore) FC Jurong	Tampines
	Hassan Sunny 8' (o.g.); Dejan Račić 78'; Sahil Suhaimi 68'		Akram Azman 3'; Mizuki Ando (yellow card) 63'	Stadium: Our Tampines Hub; Referee: Clarence Leow; Man of the Match: (North Korea) Ryang Hyon-ju

18 October 2026 4	FC Jurong (Singapore)	0–2	(Singapore) Lion City Sailors	Jurong East
	Syed Firdaus (yellow card) 54'		Giovanni Haag 41' (pen.); Shawal Anuar 77'	Stadium: Jurong East Stadium; Referee: Ahmad A'Qashah; Man of the Match: (Portugal) Diogo Costa

25 October 2026 5	FC Jurong (Singapore)	2–3	(Singapore) Tampines Rovers	Jurong East
	Seiya Satsukida 47'; Tyler Ho 90+2'; Mizuki Ando (yellow card) 38'; Shunsuke Ono (yellow card) 67'; Hazeem Bakre (yellow card) 83'		Yuki Kobayashi 24'; Hide Higashikawa 42'; Koya Kazama 45+1'; Irfan Fandi (yellow card) 38'	Stadium: Jurong East Stadium; Referee: Hilmi Fuad; Man of the Match: (Japan) Hide Higashikawa

30 October 2026 6	Tanjong Pagar United (Singapore)	1–1	(Singapore) FC Jurong	Jurong East
	Lee Jae-yong 90+10' (o.g.); Marcus Mosses (yellow card) 47'; Kieran Teo Jia Jun (yellow card) 61'; Jared Gallagher (yellow card) 90+4'	Report	Seiya Satsukida 49'; Lee Jae-yong (yellow card) 37'; Riku Fukashiro (yellow card) 43'; Shunsuke Ono (red card) 81'; Firman Nabil (yellow card) 90+3'; Christopher van Huizen (yellow card) 90+5'	Stadium: Jurong East Stadium; Referee: Taufik Thana; Man of the Match: (Japan) Seiya Satsukida

20 November 2026 7	FC Jurong (Singapore)	3–2	(Singapore) Balestier Khalsa	Jurong East
	Seo Seung-woo 31'; Lee Jae-yong 53'; Kodai Dohi 74'; Akram Azman (yellow card) 49'	Report	Daniel Goh 34', 70'; Yushin Otake (yellow card) 27'; Bill Mamadou (yellow card) 32'; Tajeli Salamat (yellow card) 76'; Marin Kuzminski (yellow card) 77'	Stadium: Jurong East Stadium; Referee: Jansen Foo; Man of the Match: (Japan) Kodai Dohi

29 November 2026 8	Tampines Rovers (Singapore)	–	(Singapore) FC Jurong	Tampines
				Stadium: Our Tampines Hub

14 February 2027 9	Lion City Sailors (Singapore)	–	(Singapore) FC Jurong	Jalan Besar
				Stadium: Jalan Besar Stadium

20 February 2027 10	FC Jurong (Singapore)	–	(Singapore) Young Lions	Jurong East
				Stadium: Jurong East Stadium

26 February 2027 11	FC Jurong (Singapore)	–	(Singapore) Geylang International	Jurong East
				Stadium: Jurong East Stadium

6 March 2027 12	Hougang United (Singapore)	–	(Singapore) FC Jurong	Bishan
				Stadium: Bishan Stadium

12 March 2027 13	FC Jurong (Singapore)	–	(Singapore) Tanjong Pagar United	Jurong East
				Stadium: Jurong East Stadium

22 January 2027 14 (Rescheduled)	FC Jurong (Singapore)	–	(Singapore) Balestier Khalsa	Jurong East
				Stadium: Jurong East Stadium

2 April 2027 15	Hougang United (Singapore)	–	(Singapore) FC Jurong	Bishan
				Stadium: Bishan Stadium

31 January 2027 16 (Rescheduled)	FC Jurong (Singapore)	–	(Singapore) Lion City Sailors	Jurong East
				Stadium: Jurong East Stadium

18 April 2027 17	Tampines Rovers (Singapore)	–	(Singapore) FC Jurong	Tampines
				Stadium: Our Tampines Hub

25 April 2027 18	FC Jurong (Singapore)	–	(Singapore) Young Lions	Jurong East
				Stadium: Jurong East Stadium

2 May 2027 19	Balestier Khalsa (Singapore)	–	(Singapore) FC Jurong	Bishan
				Stadium: Bishan Stadium

8 May 2027 20	Tanjong Pagar United (Singapore)	–	(Singapore) FC Jurong	Jurong East
				Stadium: Jurong East Stadium

14 May 2027 21	FC Jurong (Singapore)	–	(Singapore) Geylang International	Jurong East
				Stadium: Jurong East Stadium

Pos	Team	Pld	W	D	L	GF	GA	GD	Pts
1	Geylang International	6	4	2	0	12	2	+10	14
2	Lion City Sailors	5	4	1	0	20	3	+17	13
3	Tampines Rovers	5	4	1	0	13	3	+10	13
4	FC Jurong	7	3	1	3	14	11	+3	10
5	Balestier Khalsa	7	2	1	4	9	15	−6	7
6	Tanjong Pagar United	6	2	1	3	7	16	−9	7
7	Young Lions (Note: Young Lions are not eligible to represent Singapore in AFC club competitions.)	6	1	0	5	6	21	−15	3
8	Hougang United	6	0	1	5	4	14	−10	1

Updated to match(es) played on 20 November 2026. Source: Singapore Premier League
Rules for classification: 1) Points; 2) goal difference; 3) goals scored; 4) wins

== Competitions (SPL2) ==
Win Draw Loss

24 August 2026 1	FC Jurong (Singapore)	7–0	(Singapore) Young Lions	Jurong East
	Takuma Yamaguchi 12'; Toa Suenaga 13', 32'; Akram Azman 58' (yellow card) 22'; Aloysius Pang 74'; Tyler Matthew Ho Zheng Yu 76' (yellow card) 90'; Ahmad Martin 84'; Seiya Satsukida (yellow card) 45+4'	Report	Erdy Taha (yellow card) 86'	Stadium: Jurong East Stadium

30 August 2026 2	Tanjong Pagar United (Singapore)	1–1	(Singapore) FC Jurong	Jurong East
	Marvin Anieboh 45+1'; Boris Kopitović (yellow card) 5'; Marcus Mosses (yellow card) 46'; Taufik Suparno (yellow card) 52'; Syed Akmal (yellow card) 76'; Samuel Pillai (yellow card) 77'	Report	Toa Suenaga 45+1'; Seo Seung-woo (yellow card) 5'; Akram Azman (yellow card) 21'; Christopher van Huizen (yellow card) 65'; Takuma Yamaguchi (yellow card) 88'	Stadium: Jurong East Stadium

3 September 2026 3	FC Jurong (Singapore)	1–5	(Singapore) Tampines Rovers	Jurong East
	Syed Firdaus Hassan 29'; Andrew Aw (yellow card) 50'		Yuma Kimura 11'; Naufal Mohammad 70', 73'; Kenshin Yamazaki 87', 90'; Adly Nufail (yellow card) 48'	Stadium: Jurong East Stadium

7 September 2026 4	Geylang International (Singapore)	3–0	(Singapore) FC Jurong	Tampines
	Dejan Račić 6'; Ryang Hyon-ju 28'; Sahil Suhaimi 90'; Raiyan Noor (yellow card) 41'; Alessandro Lura (yellow card) 77'		Izz Anaqi (yellow card) 16'; Tyler Matthew Ho Zheng Yu (yellow card) 63'	Stadium: Our Tampines Hub

20 October 2026 5	Hougang United (Singapore)	3–2	(Singapore) FC Jurong	Tampines
	Natthakit Phosri; Khairin Nadim; Washington Jaramillo	Report		Stadium: Our Tampines Hub

7 November 2026 6	FC Jurong (Singapore)	–	(Singapore) Lion City Sailors	Jurong East
				Stadium: Jurong East Stadium

6 December 2026 7	FC Jurong (Singapore)	–	(Singapore) Balestier Khalsa	Jurong East
				Stadium: Jurong East Stadium

12 December 2026 8	Young Lions (Singapore)	–	(Singapore) FC Jurong	Jurong East
				Stadium: Jurong East Stadium

16 December 2026 9	FC Jurong (Singapore)	–	(Singapore) Tanjong Pagar United	Jurong East
				Stadium: Jurong East Stadium

20 December 2026 10	Tampines Rovers (Singapore)	–	(Singapore) FC Jurong	Tampines
				Stadium: Our Tampines Hub

5 January 2027 11	FC Jurong (Singapore)	–	(Singapore) Geylang International	Choa Chu Kang
				Stadium: Choa Chu Kang Stadium

8 January 2027 12	FC Jurong (Singapore)	–	(Singapore) Hougang United	Jurong East
				Stadium: Jurong East Stadium

12 January 2027 13	Lion City Sailors (Singapore)	–	(Singapore) FC Jurong	Jurong East
				Stadium: Jurong East Stadium

16 January 2027 14	Balestier Khalsa (Singapore)	–	(Singapore) FC Jurong	Bishan
				Stadium: Bishan Stadium

20 January 2027 15	FC Jurong (Singapore)	–	(Singapore) Young Lions	Jurong East
				Stadium: Jurong East Stadium

24 January 2027 16	FC Jurong (Singapore)	–	(Singapore) Tanjong Pagar United	Jurong East
				Stadium: Jurong East Stadium

30 January 2027 17	Tampines Rovers (Singapore)	–	(Singapore) FC Jurong	Tampines
				Stadium: Our Tampines Hub

3 February 2027 18	Geylang International (Singapore)	–	(Singapore) FC Jurong	Bedok
				Stadium: Bedok Stadium

22 February 2027 19	FC Jurong (Singapore)	–	(Singapore) Hougang United	Jurong East
				Stadium: Jurong East Stadium

1 March 2027 20	FC Jurong (Singapore)	–	(Singapore) Lion City Sailors	Jurong East
				Stadium: Jurong East Stadium

5 April 2027 21	Balestier Khalsa (Singapore)	–	(Singapore) FC Jurong	Jurong East
				Stadium: Jurong East Stadium

Pos	Team	Pld	W	D	L	GF	GA	GD	Pts	Qualification or relegation
1	Geylang International II	6	5	0	1	19	2	+17	15	Champion
2	Balestier Khalsa II	6	4	1	1	10	7	+3	13	
3	Tampines Rovers II	5	4	0	1	18	5	+13	12	
4	Young Lions B	3	2	0	1	10	7	+3	6	
5	FC Jurong II	5	1	1	3	11	12	−1	4	
6	Hougang United II	5	1	1	3	5	13	−8	4	
7	Tanjong Pagar United II	6	1	1	4	8	24	−16	4	
8	Lion City Sailors II	6	1	0	5	7	18	−11	3	

First match(es) will be played: 6 November 2026. Source: Singapore Premier League 2
Rules for classification: 1) points; 2) goal difference; 3) number of goals scored; 4) number of wins
