= 2026–27 Singapore Premier League =

Singapore Premier League
- Season: 2026–27
- Dates: 11 September 2026 – 16 May 2027
- Matches: 27
- Goals: 101 (3.74 per match)
- Top goalscorer: Hide Higashikawa (10 goals)
- Biggest home win: Lion City Sailors 6–0 Tanjong Pagar United (25 October 2026)
- Longest winning run: 5 matches Lion City Sailors
- Longest unbeaten run: 6 matches Geylang International
- Longest winless run: 6 matches Hougang United FC
- Longest losing run: 5 matches Hougang United FC and Young Lions

The 2026–27 Singapore Premier League (also known as the AIA Singapore Premier League due to sponsorship reasons) will be the 9th season of the Singapore Premier League, the top-flight Singaporean professional league for football clubs, since its rebranding in 2018.

Lion City Sailors are the defending champions after winning the previous season.

== Teams ==
A total of 8 teams compete in the league. Albirex Niigata Singapore changed their name to FC Jurong. As such, they will be subjected to the same rules as Singapore based teams.

=== Stadiums and locations ===
Locations of the 2025–26 Singapore Premier League teams from Singapore

Image	Team	Stadium	Capacity
	FC Jurong; Tanjong Pagar United	Jurong East Stadium	2,700
	Hougang United; Balestier Khalsa	Bishan Stadium	10,000
	Young Lions; Lion City Sailors	Jalan Besar Stadium	6,000
	Tampines Rovers; Geylang International	Our Tampines Hub	5,100

== Personnel, kit and sponsoring ==
Note: Flags indicate national team as has been defined under FIFA eligibility rules. Players may hold more than one non-FIFA nationality.

Team	Head coach	Captain	Kit manufacturer	Main shirt sponsor
Balestier Khalsa	(Croatia) Marko Kraljević	TBA	(Spain) Kelme	(Singapore) Emerald Law LLC
FC Jurong	(Singapore) Jaswinder Singh	TBA	(Japan) CORAZÓN	(Japan) Takasago Singapore
Geylang International	(Singapore) Noor Ali	TBA	(Thailand) FBT	(Singapore) Emerald Eagles
Hougang United	(Singapore) Akbar Nawas	TBA	(Thailand) Imane	None
Lion City Sailors	(England) Mark Jackson	TBA	(Germany) Adidas	(Singapore) Sea
Tampines Rovers	(Singapore) Nazri Nasir	TBA	(Thailand) Warrix	(Japan) FBMG
Tanjong Pagar United	(Spain) Miki Lladó	TBA	(Singapore) Thorb	None
Young Lions	(Singapore) Firdaus Kassim	TBA	(Germany) Adidas	(China) Dongfeng

=== Coaching changes ===
Team	Outgoing head coach	Manner of departure	Date of vacancy	Position in the table	Incoming head coach	Date of appointment
FC Jurong	(Japan) Keiji Shigetomi	Redesignated to a technical role	1 June 2026	Pre-season	(Singapore) Jaswinder Singh	2 June 2026
Tampines Rovers	(Singapore) William Phang (interim)	End of interim period	1 July 2026	Pre-season	(Singapore) Nazri Nasir	2 July 2026
Tanjong Pagar United	(Singapore) Noh Alam Shah	Sacked	1 July 2026	Pre-season	(Spain) Miki Lladó	10 August 2026
Lion City Sailors	(Spain) Jesús Casas	Sacked	1 September 2026	Pre-season	(England) Mark Jackson	9 September 2026

== Foreign players ==
Clubs is to register a combined squad for both the Singapore Premier League (SPL) and the reserve league. The squad must comprise a minimum of 36 players to a maximum of 50 players, with at least 25 players being Singaporean. While there is no minimum number of foreign players a club must register, depending on the squad size, theoretically, a club can have 25 Singaporeans and 25 foreigners in their 50-player squad.

- Players name in **bold** indicates the players were registered during the mid-season transfer window.
- Players name in italics indicates the player were out of squad or left their respective clubs during the mid-season transfer window / before season end.
- Players with SPL2 are registered mainly for SPL2 competition.

Note: Flags indicate national team as has been defined under FIFA eligibility rules. Players may hold more than one non-FIFA nationality. Flags indicate national team as has been defined under FIFA eligibility rules. Players may hold more than one non-FIFA nationality.

Club	Player 1	Player 2	Player 3	Player 4	Player 5	Player 6	Player 7	Player 8	Player 9	Player 10	Player 11	Player 12	Player 13	Player 14	Former Player (s)
Balestier Khalsa	(Croatia) Jakov Katuša	(Croatia) Marin Kuzminski	(Croatia) Mario Mustapić	(Croatia) Tin Matić	(Japan) Hiro Mizuguchi	(Japan) Jun Kobayashi	(Japan) Yushin Otake								
FC Jurong	(Japan) Keisuke Honda	(Japan) Kodai Dohi	(Japan) Komei Iida	(Japan) Mizuki Ando	(Japan) Seiya Satsukida	(Japan) Shunsuke Ono	(Japan) Takuma Yamaguchi	(Japan) Toa Suenaga	(South Korea) Kim Yoon-sik	(South Korea) Lee Jae-yong	(South Korea) Lee Jin-woo	(South Korea) Seo Seung-woo			
Geylang International	(Japan) Kaisei Ogawa	(Japan) Naoki Yoshioka	(Japan) Ryoya Taniguchi	(Montenegro) Dejan Račić	(North Korea) Kim Tae-uk	(North Korea) Ryang Hyon-ju	(Philippines) Diego Aspiras	(Serbia) Miloš Čupić	(South Korea) Cho Eun-su	(United States) Daniel Serrano	(United States) Milan Landreman				
Hougang United	(Belgium) Ayman Kassimi	(Brazil) Lucas Cardoso	(Ecuador) Washington Jaramillo	(England) Oakley Cannonier	(England) Sam Billington	(France) Mahamé Siby	(Japan) Arya Igami	(Japan) Koki Kawachi	(Japan) Takahiro Koga	(Montenegro) Miloš Drinčić	(Scotland) Connor Flynn-Gillespie	(Thailand) Natthakit Phosri	(Thailand) Phutanet Somjit		
Lion City Sailors	(Australia) Bailey Wright	(Brazil) Hugo Gomes	(Brazil) Victor Aznar	(Croatia) Antonio Mance	(Croatia) Ivan Sušak	(Croatia) Toni Datković	(France) Giovanni Haag	(Georgia (country)) Jorge Karseladze	(Germany) Lennart Thy	(Germany) Tsiy-William Ndenge	(Guadeloupe) Matthias Phaëton	(Netherlands) Bart Ramselaar	(Netherlands) Bobby Adekanye	(Portugal) Diogo Costa	
Tampines Rovers	(Japan) Hide Higashikawa	(Japan) Kenshin Yamazaki	(Japan) Koya Kazama	(Japan) Nabel Yoshitaka Furusawa	(Japan) Seiga Sumi	(Japan) Shodai Yokoyama	(Japan) Yuki Kobayashi	(Northern Ireland) Dylan Fox							
Tanjong Pagar United	(Croatia) Lazar Vujanić	(Equatorial Guinea) Álex Masogo	(Equatorial Guinea) Marvin Anieboh	(Japan) Masahiro Sugita	(Japan) Riku Fukashiro	(Japan) Yuki Aizu	(Montenegro) Boris Kopitović	(Spain) Aitor Mujica							
Young Lions	(Japan) Daisuke Sakai	(Japan) Hisatoshi Nishido	(Japan) Miyu Sato	(Japan) Shuya Yamashita	(Japan) Toi Kagami	(Slovenia) Benjamin Žerak	(Wales) Kai Whitmore								

== League table ==
Singapore was allocated one preliminary-stage place in the 2027–28 AFC Champions League Elite and one place in the 2027–28 AFC Champions League Two after being ranked seventh among the East Region member associations for the relevant allocation cycle.

The allocation of those places to Singaporean clubs remains subject to the Football Association of Singapore's domestic nomination criteria and the AFC's club-licensing and entry requirements.

Pos	Teams	Pld	W	D	L	GF	GA	GD	Pts
1	Lion City Sailors	6	5	1	0	25	3	+22	16
2	Tampines Rovers	6	5	1	0	18	3	+15	16
3	Geylang International	7	4	2	1	12	7	+5	14
4	FC Jurong	7	3	1	3	14	11	+3	10
5	Tanjong Pagar United	7	3	1	3	11	18	−7	10
6	Balestier Khalsa	7	2	1	4	9	15	−6	7
7	Young Lions (Note: Young Lions are not eligible to represent Singapore in AFC club competitions.)	7	1	0	6	8	25	−17	3
8	Hougang United	7	0	1	6	4	19	−15	1

Updated to match(es) played on 22 November 2026. Source: Singapore Premier League
Rules for classification: 1) Points; 2) goal difference; 3) goals scored; 4) wins

== Results ==
Home \ Away	BAL	FCJ	GEY	LCS	HOU	TAM	TPU	YLI
Balestier Khalsa		–	0–0	0–4	–	–	3–4	–
Balestier Khalsa		–	–	–	–	–	–	–
FC Jurong	3–2		–	0–2	3–0	2–3	–	–
FC Jurong	–		–	–	–	–	–	–
Geylang International	–	3–1		–	3–0	–	1–0	–
Geylang International	–	–		–	–	–	–	–
Lion City Sailors	–	–	5–0		–	–	6–0	6–1
Lion City Sailors	–	–	–		–	–	–	–
Hougang United	1–2	–	–	2–2		–	–	0–2
Hougang United	–	–	–	–		0–5	–	–
Tampines Rovers	2–0	–	0–0	–	–		–	4–1
Tampines Rovers	–	–	–	–	–		–	–
Tanjong Pagar United	–	1–1	–	–	2–1	0–4		–
Tanjong Pagar United	–	–	–	–	–	–		–
Young Lions	1–2	0–4	1–5	–	–	–	–	
Young Lions	–	–	–	–	–	–	2–4	

Updated to match(es) played on 22 November 2026. Source: Singapore Premier League
Legend: Blue = home team win; Yellow = draw; Red = away team win.
For upcoming matches, an "a" indicates there is an article about the rivalry between the two participants.

== Statistics ==
=== Top scorers ===
As of

Rank	Player	Team	Goals

=== Top assists ===
As of

Rank	Player	Team	Assists

=== Hat-tricks ===
As of

Player	For	Against	Result (Date)

=== Clean sheets ===
As of

Rank	Player	Team	Clean Sheets

== Singapore Premier League Awards ==
Awards	Winners	Team
Player of the Year		
Young Player of the Year		
Coach of the Year		
Top Scorer Award		
Golden Gloves		
Goal of the Year		
Fair Play Award		
Referee of the Year		

AIA Team of the Year
Goalkeeper
Defence
Midfield
Attack
