= Aizu (surname) =

Aizu (written: 会津) is a Japanese surname. Notable people with the surname include:

- Aizu Yaichi (会津 八一, 1881–1956), Japanese poet, calligrapher and historian
- Yuki Aizu (会津 雄生, born 1996), Japanese footballer

== See also ==
- 14701 Aizu, a main-belt asteroid
