= Gimmy Bade =

French footballer (born 1974)

Personal information
- Date of birth: 1974
- Place of birth: Réunion
- Positions: Right-back; centre-back

Senior career*
Years	Team	Apps	(Gls)
1993–?	SS Saint-Louisienne		
2004	Tanjong Pagar United		
2007–?	JS Saint-Pierroise		
- SS Saint-Louisienne

Managerial career
- JCV Saint-Pierre
- 2016–?: A.F. Saint Louis
- * Club domestic league appearances and goals

Gimmy Bade (born 1974) is a French football player and coach. He is the nephew of Jean-Pierre Bade.

== Career ==
Bade was born in Réunion. Making his SS Saint-Louisienne aged 19 in 1993, he considers winning the treble- the Premier League, Cup, and Coupe D.O.M. in 2002 to be the apogee of his career.

Accompanied by Jean-Marc Audemar and Benoît Salviat, Bade joined Tanjong Pagar United of the Singaporean S.League for the 2004 season; however, the club had a poor season, coming last for multiple reasons including, as Bade stated, "inexperienced players". The defender even had to convert to the forward position for some games and was offered contracts from other Singaporean clubs following Tanjong Pagar United's disbandment.
