= Tanjong Pagar United FC =

Singaporean football club

Tanjong Pagar United
- Full name: Tanjong Pagar United Football Club
- Nicknames: The Jaguars; The Black Panthers
- Short name: TPU
- Founded: 1974; 52 years ago as Tiong Bahru Constituency Sports Club; 1996; 30 years ago as Tiong Bahru United; 1998; 28 years ago as Tanjong Pagar United
- Ground: Jurong East Stadium
- Capacity: 2,700
- Chairman: Rajesh Nair
- Manager: Miquel Lladó
- League: Singapore Premier League
- 2025–26: Singapore Premier League, 8th of 9
- Website: tpufc.joji.com.sg
Home colours	Away colours

Tanjong Pagar United Football Club is a professional football club based in Queenstown, Singapore. The club currently competes in the Singapore Premier League, the top tier of Singaporean football.

Tanjong Pagar United took part in the S.League from 1996 to 2004, and from 2011 to 2014. The club withdrew from the league after the 2004 season because of financial problems, but returned in 2011, with several similar breaks meanwhile. The club has since returned from 2020.

== History ==
=== Early years and formation (1974–1996) ===
Prior to the formation of the S.League, the club were formed as Tiong Bahru Constituency Sports Club in 1975 and debuted in Division III of the National Football League, from which they were promoted as champions in 1978. This was followed by a second successive promotion in 1979, bringing the Jaguars to Division I. In 1982, they won the President's Cup and the following year, they were national league champions. They represented Singapore in the 1984 ASEAN Club Games, finishing third, then captured The Double in 1987.

The early 1990s saw further successes, as they were Pools Cup winners in 1991 and 1993, finished runners-up in the FAS Premier League from 1991 to 1993 and bagged the FA Cup in 1994.

In 1994, the club changed its name to Tiong Bahru FC.

=== S. League era (1996–2004) ===
Their strong performances led to their selection as one of eight clubs to compete in the newly 1996 S.League season, so they were renamed to Tiong Bahru United Football Club and obtained a permanent home at the Queenstown Stadium.

In 1998, the club changed its name to Tanjong Pagar United and Lim Tong Hai captained the club in its debut season to a Singapore Cup and Singapore FA Cup double.

=== Dissolvement (2004–2010) ===
In the 2004 season, Tanjong Pagar United went through a period of difficult times where they sit at the bottom of the league table throughout the entire season. They manage to record a total of 4 wins, 5 draws and 18 losses thus seeing the club being dissolved at the end of the season due to financial problems where France defender Gimmy Bade was converted to the play in the forward position for some matches. At the end of the season, All of the club foreign players, Gimmy Bade and Jean-Marc Audemar, Benoît Salviat and Nicodeme Boucher eventually left the club.

=== Return of the club (2011–2014) ===
In the 2011 season, Tanjong Pagar United replaced Beijing Guoan Talent for the S.League spot and therefore returned to action after a six years hiatus. The Jaguars signed Korean duo Kim Seong-kyu and Kim Jong-oh, Japanese Takaya Kawanabe from J1 League side, Omiya Ardija and France player, Cyril Bagnost. The Jaguars finished the season with 3 wins, 5 draws and 27 losses finishing in 11th out of 12th position in the league.

In the 2012 season. Tanjong Pagar United bought in Gilbert Bayonne, Carlos Delgado and Anthony Aymard in which they ended their season without any slight improvement finishing in the season at the same spot.

In the 2013 season, Tanjong Pagar United reached an agreement with France head coach Patrick Vallee in which he signs France-Algerian forward duoIsmaël Benahmed and Kamel Ramdani, Brazilian-France goalkeeper Aurélien Hérisson, Moroccan Monsef Zerka and retaining Anthony Aymard for the season. The Jaguars season turned out pretty well where they finished in 6th spot out of 12th position in the league. In the 2014 season, The Jaguars signed Sébastien Etiemble to replace Ismaël Benahmed which left for USM Bel Abbès.

=== Second dissolvement (2015–2019) ===
The Jaguars also signed Germany youngster Lucas Jester for the Prime League squad. Tanjong Pagar United managed to finished in 9th spot out of 12th in the 2014 S.League which they had to dissolved the club at the end of the season due to another financial problems.

In 2017, the owners of Tanjong Pagar United stated their intent to return to Singapore Premier League for the 2019 season, and in November 2017 applied to FAS to rejoin the league. On the same month, the team also appeals to continue their jackpot operations, which is the source of club's income, after new regulations by the Ministry of Home Affairs forced the club to wind down their operations. But after their appeals were rejected by Ministry of Home Affairs and were ordered to shut down their jackpot operations in April 2018, as of September 2019, there were no further updates from the club regarding this intent.

=== Returned to action (2020–2025) ===
On 16 January 2020, the Football Association of Singapore confirms Tanjong Pagar United's participation in the 2020 Singapore Premier League season signing Japanese duo Takahiro Tanaka and Shodai Nishikawa and also Brazilians duo Luiz Júnior and Yann Motta. Tanjong Pagar United went on to have their best finished in the league finishing in fifth place during the 2021 season. In the 2023 season, Singaporean star player, Khairul Amri received the "Goal of the Year" award while playing for the club which he scored an scissors kick against Hougang United in a 2–1 away win on 6 April 2023.

On 26 April 2024, Tanjong Pagar United sign Zenivio from Cambodian club, Kirivong Sok Sen Chey in which he became the first Timorese player to play in the league. The club also signed former player Shodai Nishikawa for the 2024–25 season.

=== Revamp under new leadership (2026–present) ===
In June 2026, Tanjong Pagar United announced a new era for the club following a restructuring of its leadership and management. , Rajesh Nair, who is the co-founder of Sport Dev that runs the Singapore Barcelona Football Academy since 2022, was appointed as the club's new chairman while former Singapore international footballer Goh Tat Chuan joined as the new management committee. The changes took effect on 1 July 2026 with Raymond Tang, who had served as chairman since 2019, stepping down alongside the rest of his management committee. On 20 June 2026, Tanjong Pagar United announced a new crest, marking a change in the club's visual identity under its new management. The club also bought in 19 players with Boris Kopitović, Taufik Suparno, Madhu Mohana, Jared Gallagher, Bill Mamadou, Marcelo Villaça, Javi Gómez, Riku Fukashiro, Masahiro Sugita, former Japanese international Yuki Aizu, and two Equatorial Guinea international players, Álex Masogo and Marvin Anieboh being a notable signing ahead of the 2026–27 season.

== Team image ==
=== Crest and colours ===
The club’s identity is closely linked to its nickname, “The Jaguars” and ''The Black Panthers'', which symbolises strength, agility and competitiveness. The jaguar has been a central element of Tanjong Pagar United’s crest since the club’s early years and represents the fighting spirit and resilience associated with the team. The current crest reflects a modern and professional identity while maintaining continuity with the club’s historical imagery, reinforcing its presence in Singapore football following its return to the professional era.

As part of the club's wider revamp on 20 June 2026, Tanjong Pagar United introduced a new crest and updated its visual identity. The new crest brought in a new colours of cream brown with gold and black lining, while adopting a more modern and simplified design. The redesigned crest marked the beginning of a new visual era for the club under its new management.

=== Supporters ===
Stirling Curva

Tanjong Pagar United is supported by a core group of local fans known as Stirling Curva. The group follows the club at home matches and selected away fixtures, contributing to the match-day atmosphere through chants, banners and coordinated displays. Supporters are often seen wearing the club’s colours and play an important role in maintaining the club’s presence and identity within Singapore’s football community, particularly during the club’s rebuilding periods.

== Kit suppliers and shirt sponsors ==
Period	Kit Supplier	Main Sponsors
1996	(Germany) Adidas	(Japan) Canon
1997	(Germany) Puma	(Japan) Canon
1998–2002	(Germany) Puma	(Japan) JVC
2002–2004	(Italy) Lotto	(Japan) JVC
2010–2011	(Singapore) Thorb	(Singapore) Michezo Group
2012	(Singapore) Thorb	No sponsors
2013–2014	(Singapore) Thorb	(Singapore) SINGA Energy Drink
2020	(Singapore) Thorb	No sponsors
2021	(Indonesia) Adhoc Apparel	(Japan) Tokyo Century
2022–2023	(Thailand) FBT	(Japan) Tokyo Century
2024–2025	(Thailand) FBT	No sponsors
2025–2026	(Denmark) Hummel	(Singapore) Adactive Asia (Singapore) Carats & Co
2026–present	(Singapore) Thorb	No sponsors

== Stadium ==
The Jaguars initially played their home games at the Queenstown Stadium since 1970. However, as the Queenstown Stadium was occupied since 2010 by the French club Étoile academy, Tanjong Pagar United was temporarily based at Clementi Stadium for the duration of the 2011 season. Due to Étoile's withdrawal by the end of the 2011 season, Tanjong Pagar United shifted back to Queenstown Stadium in 2012. Ever since they were reinstalled back into the league in 2020, they share the Jurong East Stadium with Albirex Niigata (S) but still used Queenstown Stadium as their training based.

== Players ==
=== First-team squad ===
As of 14 September 2026

Note: Flags indicate national team as defined under FIFA eligibility rules; some limited exceptions apply. Players may hold more than one non-FIFA nationality.

No.	Pos.	Nation	Player
4	MF	SGP	Jared Gallagher (vice-captain)
5	DF	SGP	Syed Akmal
6	DF	SGP	Madhu Mohana (captain)
7	MF	CRO	Lazar Vujanić
8	DF	JPN	Yuki Aizu
9	FW	MNE	Boris Kopitović (vice-captain)
10	MF	JPN	Masahiro Sugita (vice-captain)
11	MF	JPN	Riku Fukashiro
12	GK	SGP	Kenji Syed Rusydi
13	FW	SGP	Taufik Suparno
15	DF	SGP	Marcus Mosses ^{U23}

No.	Pos.	Nation	Player
17	MF	SGP	Naqiuddin Eunos
18	MF	GEQ	Álex Masogo
19	DF	SGP	Samuel Pillai ^{U23}
20	DF	GEQ	Marvin Anieboh
21	DF	SGP	Kieran Teo ^{U23}
22	DF	SGP	Syahrul Sazali
23	MF	SGP	Fathullah Rahmat
28	FW	SGP	Zahil Rahman
29	FW	SGP	Risvi Aaqil ^{U21}
66	FW	SGP	Anaqi Ismit
72	GK	SGP	Travis Ang ^{U23}
82	GK	ESP	Aitor Mujica

=== Reserve League (SPL2) squad ===
Note: Flags indicate national team as defined under FIFA eligibility rules; some limited exceptions apply. Players may hold more than one non-FIFA nationality.

No.	Pos.	Nation	Player
26	DF	SGP	Haziq Zulkifli ^{U21}
27	GK	CHN	Yue Liantian ^{FP U23}
30	DF	SGP	Hafid Sohan Rifa'i ^{U21}
31	MF	SGP	Adly Irfan ^{U21}
32	FW	SGP	Shahreez Basheer ^{U21}
33	MF	SGP	Xia Zeyu ^{U21}
34	DF	MAS	Deshan Gunasegara ^{FP U21}
35	FW	SGP	Raoul Shah ^{U21}
36	FW	SGP	Lucas Alessandro Yeo ^{U21}
37	DF	SGP	Daniyal Lynn Rasor ^{U23}
38	FW	SGP	Khasmir Effendi ^{U21}

No.	Pos.	Nation	Player
39	FW	SGP	Darius Lai Jyun Tang ^{U21}
41	GK	SGP	Hazwan Afiq ^{U21}
44	FW	SGP	Irhan Hussaini Saifudin ^{U21}
47	MF	AUS	Vinnie Ucchino ^{FP U21}
48	MF	SGP	Darren Choong Cheng Jun ^{U21}
50	MF	CAN	Miro Valio Jai ^{FP U21}
51	MF	NOR	Nils Carballeira ^{FP U21}
52	FW	SGP	Dhafyr Iman ^{U21}
56	MF	PHI	Neil Charles Callanta ^{FP U21}
67	MF	SGP	Fazul Azim ^{U21}
68	DF	SGP	Jeff Lam ^{U21}
70	MF	SGP	Lim Xuan Hui ^{U21}

=== On Loan ===
Note: Flags indicate national team as defined under FIFA eligibility rules; some limited exceptions apply. Players may hold more than one non-FIFA nationality.

No.	Pos.	Nation	Player
21	DF	SGP	Farid Jafri (National Service until 2027)
26	FW	SGP	Saiful Azhar Saifuddin (National Service until 2027)
1	GK	SGP	Prathip Ekamparam (National Service until 2027)

== Management and staff ==
=== Management ===
Position	Name
Chairman	(Singapore) Rajesh Nair
Vice-chairman	(Singapore) Goh Tat Chuan
Honorary Secretary	(Singapore) Oliver Bruce Stewart
Honorary Treasurer	(Singapore) Jeremy Yeo Sze Choon
General Manager	(Singapore) Desmund Khusnin
Sporting Director	(Spain) Quim Besora

=== Technical staff ===
Position	Name
Head coach	(Spain) Miquel Lladó
Assistant coach	(Singapore) Jaslee Hatta
Assistant coach	(Singapore) Indra Sahdan Daud
Goalkeeping coach	(Malaysia) Khairul Nizam
Assistant coach	(Singapore) Ismail Bin Yunos
Fitness coach	(Spain) Nil Asensio
Youth coach	(Singapore) Indra Sahdan
U17 Coach	(Singapore) Ridhuan Muhammad
Physiotherapist	(Singapore) Fadhli Hussein

== Honours ==
Type	Competition	Titles	Seasons
League	National Football League Division One	2	1983, 1987
Cup	Singapore FA Cup *	5	1982, 1985, 1987, 1994, 1998
Cup	Singapore Cup	1	1998

Runners up:

- National Football League Division One - 1979, 1986
- FAS Premier League - 1991, 1992, 1993 and 1995
- S. League - 1997, 2000

Note *: Known as the President's Cup between 1968 and 1993

== Awards ==
=== Domestic ===
- League Player of the Year
  - (Singapore) Shunmugham Subramani (1998)
  - (Singapore) Daniel Bennett (2001)
- League Young Player of the Year
  - (Singapore) Lim Soon Seng (1998)
- League Coach of the Year
  - (Singapore) P. N. Sivaji (1996)
- League Goal of the Year
  - (Singapore) Khairul Amri against Hougang United on 6 April 2023.
- League Team of the Year
  - (Brazil) Luiz Júnior (2020)

== Statistics and records ==
As of 11 August 2026.

=== Top 10 all-time appearances ===
Rank	Player	Years	Club appearances
1	(Japan) Shodai Nishikawa	2020–2022, 2024–2026	104
1	(Singapore) Raihan Rahman	2020–2023, 2025–2026	104
3	(Singapore) Asraf Rashid	2012–2015	82
4	(Singapore) Faizal Roslan	2023–2026	79
5	(Singapore) Delwinder Singh	2011–2012, 2020–2021	77
6	(Singapore) Hanafi Salleh	2012–2015	74
7	(Australia) Blake Ricciuto	2021–2023	72
8	(Singapore) Fathullah Rahmat	2021–2023, 2025–2026	72
9	(France) Aurélien Hérisson	2013–2015	68
10	(Morocco) Monsef Zerka	2013–2014	65

=== Top 10 all-time scorers ===
Rank	Player	Club appearances	Total goals
1	(Japan) Reo Nishiguchi	51	39
2	(Morocco) Monsef Zerka	65	33
3	(France) Kamel Ramdani	57	20
4	(Brazil) Luiz Júnior	32	18
5	(Japan) Takaya Kawanabe	58	15
6	(Singapore) Khairul Amri	61	14
7	(Japan) Shodai Nishikawa	104	13
7	(Australia) Blake Ricciuto	70	13
9	(France) Ismaël Benahmed	34	11
9	(France) Sébastien Etiemble	32	11
9	(Singapore) Aleksandar Đurić	16	11

- Biggest wins: 8–1 vs Young Lions (1 October 2022)
- Heaviest defeats: 9–0 vs Tampines Rovers (16 March 2004)
- Youngest goal scorers: Arisman Arman ~ 18 years 10 months 17 days old (On 19 June 2011 vs Young Lions)
- Oldest goal scorers: Daniel Bennett ~ 44 years 7 months 27 days old (On 3 September 2022 vs Hougang United)
- Youngest ever debutant: Vincenzo Ucchino ~ 15 years 7 months 7 days old (On 6 December 2025 vs Geylang International)
- Oldest ever player: Daniel Bennett ~ 44 years 9 months 30 days old (On 6 November 2022 vs Geylang International)

== Notable players ==
=== International capped players ===
AFC/OFC.: (Australia) Jesse Daley; (Australia) Kris Trajanovski; (Australia) Vlado Bozinovski; (Chinese Taipei) Emilio Estevez; (Iran) Majid Namjoo-Motlagh; (Japan) Hiroaki Tanaka; (Japan) Masahiro Sugita; (Japan) Yuki Aizu; (Thailand) Choketawee Promrut; (Thailand) Sutee Suksomkit; (Thailand) Thawatchai Damrong-Ongtrakul; (Timor-Leste) Zenivio; (Uzbekistan) Timur Talipov	CAF.: (Cameroon) Émile Mbouh; (Equatorial Guinea) Álex Masogo; (Equatorial Guinea) Marvin Anieboh; (Morocco) Monsef Zerka	UEFA.: (Germany) Jörg Steinebrunner	CONMEBOL/ CONCACAF.: (Brazil) Luiz Júnior

== Statistics and records ==
=== Performance by coach ===
The following table provides a summary of the coach appointed by the club.

Manager	Period	Achievements
(Singapore) P. N. Sivaji	1996	
(Netherlands) Robert Alberts	1996–1998	
(Singapore) Tohari Paijan	1998–2002	1998 Singapore FA Cup
(Malaysia) Moey Yoke Ham	2003–2004	
(Morocco) Karim Bencherifa	2004	
Dissolvement (2004–2010)
(Singapore) Terry Pathmanathan	2011–2012	
(France) Patrick Vallée	2012–2014	
Dissolvement (2015–2019)
(Singapore) Hairi Su'ap	2020	
(Singapore) Hasrin Jailani	2020–2024	
(Singapore) Hyrizan Jufri	2024	
(Singapore) Noh Alam Shah (interim)	2025–2026	
(Spain) Miquel Lladó	2026–present	

== Seasons by season record ==
Season	S.League								Singapore Cup	Singapore League Cup
Season	Pos	P	W	D	L	F	A	Pts	Singapore Cup	Singapore League Cup
1996-1	5th	14	4	5	5	20	19	17		
1996-2	2nd*	14	8	3	3	35	18	27		
1997	2nd	16	10	4	2	33	16	34		
1998	2nd	20	14	4	2	39	15	46	Winners	
1999	3rd	22	11	8	3	40	25	41	Round of 16	
2000	2nd	22	12	7	3	50	23	43	Quarter-finals	
2001	4th	33	18	6	9	68	47	60	Semi-finals	
2002	9th	33	11	4	18	49	72	37	Quarter-finals	
2003	10th	33	8	2–0	23	36	78	28	Group stage	
2004	10th	27	4	5	18	29	72	17	Preliminary	
2005										
2006
2007
2008
2009
2010
2011	11th	33	3	5	25	21	77	14	Round of 16	Preliminary
2012	12th	24	5	5	14	17	41	20	Round of 16	Group stage
2013	6th	27	9	9	9	36	34	36	Runners-up	Quarter-finals
2014	9th	27	8	5	14	35	44	29	Quarter-finals	Runners-up
2015										
2016
2017
2018
2019
2020	8th	14	0	5	9	14	33	5		
2021	5th	21	5	7	9	36	49	22		
2022	6th	28	10	7	11	59	69	37	Group stage	
2023	8th	24	6	3	15	39	62	21	Group stage	
2024–25	8th	32	3	7	22	35	103	16	Group stage	
2025–26	8th	21	2	1	18	17	63	7	Group stage	

- The 1996 season of the S.League was split into two series. Tiger Beer Series winners Geylang United defeated Pioneer Series winners Singapore Armed Forces in the Championship playoff to clinch the S.League title.
- 2003 saw the introduction of penalty shoot-outs if a match ended in a draw in regular time. Winners of penalty shoot-outs gained two points instead of one.
- Tanjong Pagar United sat out the S.League from 2005 to 2010, and withdrew from the competition between 2015 and 2019.
