= Ismaël Benahmed =

French footballer (born 1989)

Personal information
- Date of birth: 20 February 1989 (age 37)
- Place of birth: Ploemeur, France
- Height: 1.87 m (6 ft 2 in)
- Position: Forward

Team information
- Current team: Saint-Nazaire

Senior career*
| Years | Team | Apps | (Gls) |
| 2010–2013 | Poiré-sur-Vie | | |
| 2013 | Tanjong Pagar | 25 | (7) |
| 2014 | USM Bel-Abbès | | |
| 2014–2015 | Aubervilliers | 18 | (4) |
| 2015–2017 | Épinal | 17 | (4) |
| 2017 | Stade Plabennec | 12 | (1) |
| 2018 | SK Pepingen-Halle | 12 | (3) |
| 2018–2019 | FC Challans | 11 | (2) |
| 2019–2021 | La Roche | 12 | (2) |
| 2021–2022 | JSC Bellevue Nantes | | |
| 2022 | Les Sables-d'Olonne | | |
| 2022– | Saint-Nazaire | 0 | (0) |
- * Club domestic league appearances and goals as of 10:52, 24 July 2022 (UTC)

Ismaël Benahmed (born 20 February 1989) is a French professional footballer who plays as a forward for Championnat National 3 club Saint-Nazaire.

== Career ==
Transferring to Tanjong Pagar United of the Singapore S.League for the 2013 season, Benahmed partnered up with Moroccan Monsef Zerka up front, earning an emolument higher than what he was used to in France. However, in the end, he longed to see his family and cancelled the option of a contract extension, eventually leaving the club. Authoring a hat-trick in a 4–0 victory over Garena Young Lions, he claimed the level of play in Singapore was between the French fourth and third divisions.

Upon returning to France, the attacker had the opportunity to sign for a Romanian team, Târgu Mureș, but the deal never happened.

He has also played for USM Bel-Abbès, Aubervilliers, Épinal, Stade Plabennécois, SK Pepingen-Halle, La Roche, JSC Bellevue Nantes, Les Sables-d'Olonne, and Saint-Nazaire.
