= Tsubasa Ando =

Japanese footballer

Personal information
- Date of birth: 12 May 1996 (age 30)
- Place of birth: Tsukumi, Ōita, Japan
- Height: 1.70 m (5 ft 7 in)
- Position: Midfielder

Team information
- Current team: SC Sagamihara
- Number: 14

Youth career
- FC Saeki S-play MINAMI
- 2012–2014: Nagasaki IAS High School

College career
Years	Team	Apps	(Gls)
2015–2018	Komazawa University		

Senior career*
Years	Team	Apps	(Gls)
2019	Honda Lock	28	(16)
2020	Vanraure Hachinohe	31	(8)
2021–2024	SC Sagamihara	8	(0)
2024-2025	Matsumoto Yamaga	48	(8)
2026–	SC Sagamihara	11	(1)
- * Club domestic league appearances and goals as of 17 August 2026

Tsubasa Ando (安藤 翼, Ando Tsubasa; born 12 May 1996) is a Japanese footballer currently playing as a midfielder for SC Sagamihara.

His younger brother Mizuki is also a professional footballer currently playing for J2 League side Mito HollyHock.

== Career statistics ==
=== Club ===
As of 23 June 2021.

Club	Season	League			National Cup		League Cup		Other		Total	
Club	Season	Division	Apps	Goals	Apps	Goals	Apps	Goals	Apps	Goals	Apps	Goals
Nagasaki Institute of Applied Science HS	2012	–			1 (Note: Appearances in the Emperor's Cup)	0	–		0	0	1	0
Komazawa University	2018	–			1	0	–		0	0	1	0
Honda Lock	2019	JFL	28	16	2	1	–		0	0	30	17
Vanraure Hachinohe	2020	J3 League	31	8	0	0	–		0	0	31	8
SC Sagamihara	2021	J2 League	8	0	2	0	–		0	0	10	0
Career total			67	24	6	1	0	0	0	0	73	25
