= Aurélien Hérisson =

French-Brazilian footballer (born 1990)

Personal information
- Full name: Aurélien-Emmanuel Hérisson
- Date of birth: 17 February 1990 (age 36)
- Place of birth: Campina Grande, Brazil
- Height: 1.87 m (6 ft 2 in)
- Position: Goalkeeper

Senior career*
Years	Team	Apps	(Gls)
2008–2010	Rennes B	7	(0)
2010–2011	ÉDS Montluçon	5	(0)
2011–2012	Compiegne	49	(0)
2012	Le Poiré-sur-Vie B	3	(0)
2013–2015	Tanjong Pagar United	52	(0)
2015–2016	GSI Pontivy	26	(0)
2016–2017	US Montagnarde		
- * Club domestic league appearances and goals

Aurélien-Emmanuel Hérisson (born 17 February 1990) is a French-Brazilian professional footballer who plays as a goalkeeper.
