= Vladan Seric =

Serbia and Montenegro footballer (born 1981)

Personal information
- Date of birth: 30 July 1981 (age 45)
- Place of birth: SFR Yugoslavia
- Height: 1.91 m (6 ft 3 in)
- Position: Defender

Youth career
- Partizan

Senior career*
Years	Team	Apps	(Gls)
- Teleoptik
- Železničar Beograd
- Voždovac
2004	→ Young Lions (loan)		
2005	SAFFC		
- * Club domestic league appearances and goals

Vladan Seric (born 30 July 1981) is a Serbia and Montenegro former footballer who is last known to have played for Singapore Armed Forces of the Singapore S.League in 2005.

== Young Lions ==
Securing a trial with Young Lions of the Singapore S.League in 2004, Seric was ensnared in a mishap in Dubai, where he stopped over, so he arrive in Singapore without luggage. The loan move happened 10 days after he began his trial with Seric adapting well and planning to stay longer in Singapore.
