= Jean-Marc Audemar =

French footballer (born 1971)

Personal information
- Date of birth: August 15, 1971 (age 54)
- Place of birth: France
- Position: Defender

Senior career*
Years	Team	Apps	(Gls)
- FC Vaulx-en-Velin
–2004	SS Saint-Louisienne		
2004	Tanjong Pagar United FC		
2006	SS La Capricorne		
2006	US Possession		(2+)
2007	US Stade Tamponnaise		
- * Club domestic league appearances and goals

Jean-Marc Audemar (born 15 August 1971) is a French retired footballer who is last known to have played for US Stade Tamponnaise of the Reunion Premier League in 2007.

== Singapore ==
Following Benoît Salviat and Nicodeme Boucher to Singapore's Tanjong Pagar United in early 2004, Audemar finished the season among the best defenders in the league and was nominated for the Singapore Pools People's Choice Award, having been forced to leave Tanjong Pagar United due to their overleveragedness. He did not exclude a return to Reunion though, and, in 2006, sealed a move to US Possession.
