= Jared Gallagher =

Singaporean footballer (born 2002)

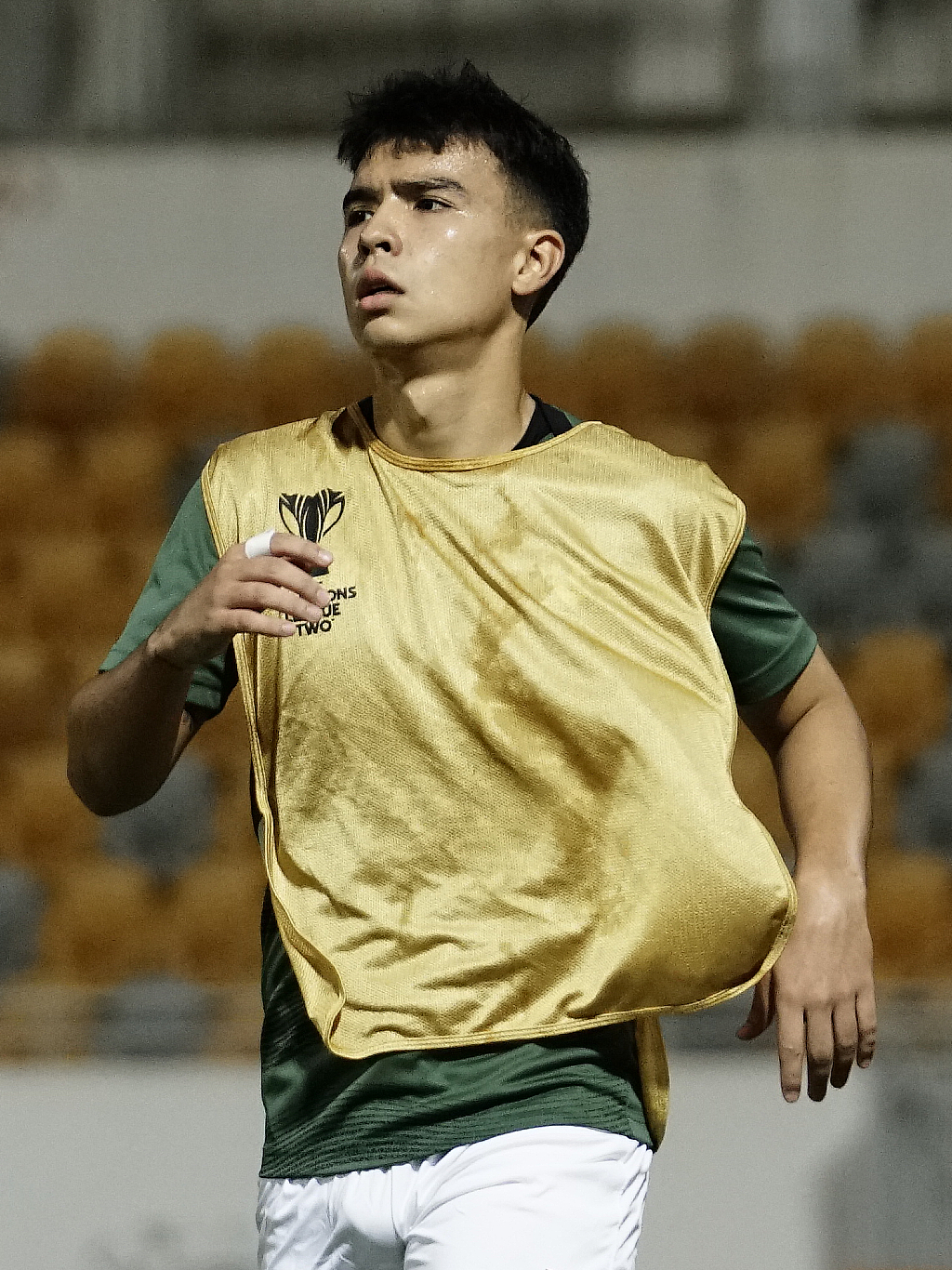
- Gallagher with Tampines Rovers in 2024

Personal information
- Full name: Jared Sean Gallagher
- Date of birth: 18 January 2002 (age 24)
- Place of birth: Singapore
- Height: 1.75 m (5 ft 9 in)
- Position: Midfielder

Team information
- Current team: Tanjong Pagar United

Youth career
- 2018–2019: KCC
- 2019–2021: Kitchee

Senior career*
Years	Team	Apps	(Gls)
2021–2023	Young Lions	43	(2)
2024–2025	Tampines Rovers	18	(0)
2025	→ Balestier Khalsa (loan)	9	(0)
2025–2026	Albirex Niigata (S)	3	(0)
2026	Nakhon Ratchasima	2	(0)
2026–	Tanjong Pagar United	0	(0)

International career^{‡}
2021–2025	Singapore U23	14	(0)
- * Club domestic league appearances and goals as of 12 January 2026 ‡ National team caps and goals as of 30 June 2022

Jared Sean Gallagher (born 18 January 2002) is a Singaporean professional footballer who plays as a midfielder for Singapore Premier League club Tanjong Pagar United.

== Youth career ==
As a child with many interests, while studying in Shanghai, he landed the lead to his middle school musical “Helen on West 86th Street” where he showcased his singing talents in a 3 minute solo. While staying in Hong Kong, Gallagher played with the Kowloon Cricket Club’s (KCC) U-16 and U-18 side before switching to Kitchee SC's Under-18 academy side. He also played with fellow Yau Yee League sides Azzuri and German All Stars, both playing massive roles in his journey to become a professional footballer.

== Club career ==
=== Young Lions ===
On 19 July 2023, Gallagher was announced as a new Young Lions signing during the mid season transfer window in the 2021 season, but did not make any appearances that season. Gallagher then made his professional career debut on 19 March 2022 in a 4–3 loss against Balestier Khalsa, where he played the entire match.

On 18 March 2023, Gallagher scored his first professional goal against Hougang United in the 2023 season in a 2–1 triumph over the Cheetahs. Following the end of the 2023 season, it was announced that Gallagher would leave the Young Lions.

=== Tampines Rovers ===
On 2 February 2024, Gallagher joined another Singapore Premier League club, Tampines Rovers. He made his debut for the club in a 3–1 win over Albirex Niigata (S) on 12 May 2024. Gallagher then made his 2024–25 AFC Champions League Two debut against Thailand club Bangkok United on 18 September 2024.

==== Loan to Balestier Khalsa ====
On 31 January 2025, Singapore Premier League club Balestier Khalsa would announce the loan signing of Gallagher till the end of the 2024–25 Singapore Premier League season.

=== Albirex Niigata (S) ===
Jared signed for Albirex Niigata (S) for the 2025–26 Singapore Premier League season.

=== Nakhon Ratchasima ===
On 12 January 2026, it was announced that Jared has joined Thai League 1 side Nakhon Ratchasima for the remainder of the 2025–26 Thai League 1 season.

== International career ==
=== Youth ===
Gallagher was born to an Irish father and a Singaporean mother, which means that he is eligible to represent either Ireland or Singapore.

On 25 October 2021, Gallagher was called up to the Singapore under-23 national team. He made his debut on 31 October 2021 against South Korea U-23 during the 2022 AFC U-23 Asian Cup qualification match.

=== Senior ===
On 7 March 2024, Gallagher was called up to the senior squad for the 2026 FIFA World Cup qualification match against China.

== Personal life ==
Jared studied at Yew Chung International School in Hong Kong for his secondary education and entered the National University of Singapore following his return to Singapore.

Born to an Irish father and a Singaporean mother, Jared grew up in Bukit Gombak and then moved overseas to Shanghai in China and then Hong Kong before finally returning home in March 2020 to be enlisted for national service. Due to his Irish roots, he supports the Irish club, Silgo Rovers, where he was invited for a chance to go for a 1 month trial stint in June 2023.

Jared has his own podcast show, called the Stuck In Podcast where he hosts expat and local footballers and talks about the local Singaporean football scene.

== Career statistics ==
=== Club ===
As of match played 1 July 2025

Club	Season	League			FA Cup		Continental		Total	
Club	Season	Division	Apps	Goals	Apps	Goals	Apps	Goals	Apps	Goals
Young Lions	2021	Singapore Premier League	0	0	0	0	0	0	0	0
Young Lions	2022	Singapore Premier League	24	0	3	0	0	0	27	0
Young Lions	2023	Singapore Premier League	7	1	0	0	0	0	7	1
Young Lions	Total		31	1	3	0	0	0	34	1
Tampines Rovers	2024–25	Singapore Premier League	16	0	0	0	3	0	19	0
Balestier Khalsa	2024–25	Singapore Premier League	9	0	4	0	0	0	13	0
Career total			56	1	7	0	3	0	66	1

=== International statistics ===
==== U23 International caps ====
No	Date	Venue	Opponent	Result	Competition
1	31 October 2021	Jalan Besar Stadium, Jalan Besar, Singapore	South Korea	1–5 (lost)	2022 AFC U-23 Asian Cup qualification
2	16 February 2022	Prince Stadium, Phnom Penh, Cambodia	Thailand	1–3 (lost)	2022 AFF U-23 Championship
3	19 February 2022	Prince Stadium, Phnom Penh, Cambodia	Vietnam	0–7 (lost)	2022 AFF U-23 Championship
4	11 May 2022	Thiên Trường Stadium, Nam Định, Vietnam	Cambodia	1-0 (won)	2021 SEA Games
5	14 May 2022	Thiên Trường Stadium, Nam Định, Vietnam	Malaysia	2-2 (draw)	2021 SEA Games
6	24 March 2023	Jalan Besar Stadium, Jalan Besar, Singapore	Hong Kong	0–1 (lost)	Merlion Cup
7	26 March 2023	Jalan Besar Stadium, Jalan Besar, Singapore	Cambodia	1–2 (lost)	Merlion Cup
8	29 April 2023	Prince Stadium, Phnom Penh, Cambodia	Thailand	1–3 (lost)	2023 SEA Games
9	3 May 2023	Prince Stadium, Phnom Penh, Cambodia	Vietnam	1–3 (lost)	2023 SEA Games
10	6 May 2023	Prince Stadium, Phnom Penh, Cambodia	Laos	0-0 (draw)	2023 SEA Games
11	11 May 2023	Prince Stadium, Phnom Penh, Cambodia	Malaysia	0-7 (lost)	2023 SEA Games
12	6 Sept 2023	Việt Trì Stadium, Phú Thọ, Vietnam	Yemen	0-3 (lost)	2024 AFC U-23 Asian Cup qualification
