= Mizuki Ando =

Japanese footballer

Mizuki Ando 安藤 瑞季
Personal information
- Full name: Mizuki Ando
- Date of birth: 19 July 1999 (age 27)
- Place of birth: Tsukumi, Ōita, Japan
- Height: 1.75 m (5 ft 9 in)
- Position: Forward

Team information
- Current team: FC Jurong
- Number: 9

Youth career
- –2011: Aoe SSS
- 2012–2014: Saiki S-Play Minami
- 2015–2017: Nagasaki IAS High School

Senior career*
Years	Team	Apps	(Gls)
2018–2021	Cerezo Osaka U-23	48	(12)
2018–2021	Cerezo Osaka	1	(0)
2020	→ Machida Zelvia (loan)	33	(7)
2021–2026	Mito HollyHock	132	(21)
2026–	FC Jurong	3	(1)
- * Club domestic league appearances and goals as of 1 January 2026

Mizuki Ando (安藤 瑞季, Andō Mizuki; born 19 July 1999) is a Japanese football player who plays for Singapore Premier League club FC Jurong.

== Career ==
Mizuki Ando joined J1 League club Cerezo Osaka in 2018. He made his debut in J1 League in March 2018, featuring in two matches of AFC Champions League.

He was announced as a new signing for Singapore Premier League side FC Jurong ahead of the 2026–27 SPL season.

== Club statistics ==
As of 15 October 2026.

Appearances and goals by club, season and competition
Club	Season	League			National cup (Note: Includes Emperor's Cup)		League cup (Note: Includes J.League Cup)		Continental		Other		Total	
Club	Season	Division	Apps	Goals	Apps	Goals	Apps	Goals	Apps	Goals	Apps	Goals	Apps	Goals
Cerezo Osaka U-23	2018	J3 League	15	1	–		–		–		–		15	1
Cerezo Osaka U-23	2019	J3 League	33	11	–		–		–		–		33	11
Cerezo Osaka U-23	Total		48	12	0	0	0	0	0	0	0	0	48	12
Cerezo Osaka	2018	J1 League	1	0	1	0	0	0	2 (Note: Appearances in AFC Champions League)	0	1 (Note: Appearance in Suruga Bank Championship)	0	5	0
Cerezo Osaka	2019	J1 League	0	0	1	1	0	0	0	0	0	0	1	1
Cerezo Osaka	2020	J1 League	0	0	0	0	0	0	0	0	0	0	0	0
Cerezo Osaka	Total		1	0	2	1	0	0	2	0	1	0	6	1
Machida Zelvia (loan)	2020	J2 League	33	7	–		–		–		–		33	7
Mito HollyHock	2021	J2 League	34	6	1	0	0	0	–		–		35	6
Mito HollyHock	2022	J2 League	32	3	0	0	0	0	–		–		32	3
Mito HollyHock	2023	J2 League	34	9	2	0	0	0	–		–		36	9
Mito HollyHock	2024	J2 League	23	2	2	1	0	0	–		–		25	3
Mito HollyHock	2025	J2 League	9	1	0	0	2	1	–		–		11	2
Mito HollyHock	Total		132	21	5	1	2	1	0	0	0	0	139	23
FC Jurong	2026–27	Singapore Premier League	3	1	–		–		–		–		3	1
Career total			217	41	7	2	2	1	2	0	1	0	229	44

== Personal life ==
His elder brother Tsubasa is also a professional footballer.
