= Javi Gómez (footballer, born 1999) =

Spanish footballer

Personal information
- Full name: Javier Gómez Castroverde
- Date of birth: 10 January 1999 (age 27)
- Place of birth: Toledo, Spain
- Height: 1.74 m (5 ft 9 in)
- Position: Winger

Team information
- Current team: Guadalajara
- Number: 17

Youth career
- 2013–2018: Rayo Vallecano

Senior career*
Years	Team	Apps	(Gls)
2018–2020	Fuenlabrada	33	(2)
2020	→ Celta B (loan)	6	(1)
2020–2021	Burgos	22	(2)
2021–2022	Celta B	42	(3)
2023	CF La Nucía	20	(2)
2023–2024	CE Sabadell	1	(1)
2024–2025	Algeciras	26	(2)
2025–2026	Tarazona	16	(1)
2026–	Guadalajara	15	(1)
- * Club domestic league appearances and goals as of 10 June 2026

Javier "Javi" Gómez Castroverde (born 10 January 1999) is a Spanish professional footballer who plays as a left winger for Primera Federación club Guadalajara.

== Club career ==
Born in Toledo, Spain, Castilla–La Mancha, Gómez represented Rayo Vallecano as a youth. On 17 July 2018, after finishing his formation, he signed a three-year contract with CF Fuenlabrada in Segunda División B.

Gómez made his senior debut on 26 August 2018, coming on as a second-half substitute for Borja Lázaro in a 5–1 home routing of Salamanca CF. He scored his first goal on 2 December, netting the last of a 4–0 thrashing of Internacional de Madrid, and finished the campaign with two goals in 30 appearances as his side achieved a first-ever promotion to Segunda División.

Gómez made his professional debut on 15 September 2019, starting in a 0–2 away loss against CD Lugo. The following 27 January, after just three league appearances during the campaign, he was loaned to Celta de Vigo B in the third division, until June.

On 5 October 2020, after terminating his contract with Fuenla, Gómez signed for Burgos CF in the third division. The following 9 July, after helping in another promotion to the second division, he returned to Celta and its B-team.

On 4 July 2024, Gómez joined Algeciras in the third tier.

On 9 January 2026, he moved to Guadalajara.
