= Marvin Anieboh =

Equatoguinean footballer (born 1997)

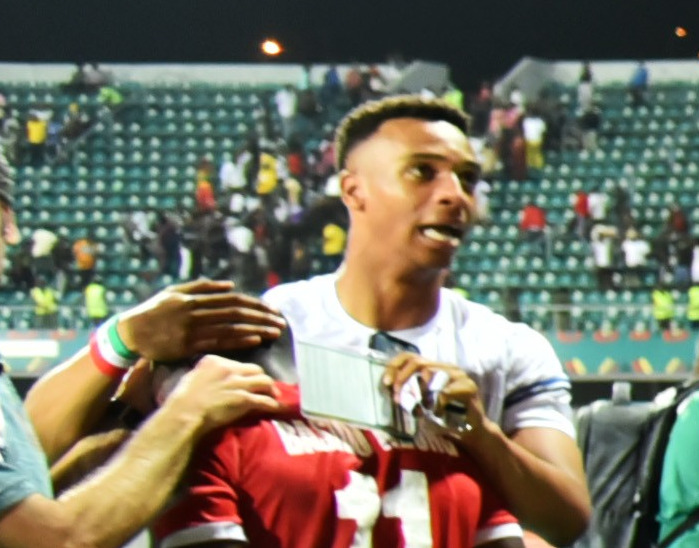
- Anieboh with Equatorial Guinea in 2022

Personal information
- Full name: Marvin José Anieboh Pallaruelo
- Date of birth: 26 August 1997 (age 29)
- Place of birth: Madrid, Spain
- Height: 1.87 m (6 ft 2 in)
- Positions: Centre-back; right-back

Team information
- Current team: Tanjong Pagar United

Youth career
- 2011–2013: Alcorcón
- 2013–2014: Getafe
- 2014–2016: Fuenlabrada

Senior career*
Years	Team	Apps	(Gls)
2016–2018	Fuenlabrada B	18	(2)
2017–2018	→ Los Yébenes SB (loan)	32	(2)
2018–2019	Carabanchel	29	(0)
2019–2020	Alcorcón B	15	(1)
2019	Alcorcón	0	(0)
2020–2022	Cacereño	41	(1)
2022	Vélez	0	(0)
2022	→ Utsiktens BK (loan)	7	(0)
2023	Montijo	16	(0)
2023–2024	Illescas	21	(1)
2024–2025	Don Benito	8	(0)
2025–2026	SS Reyes	43	(4)
2026–	Tanjong Pagar United	0	(0)

International career^{‡}
2015	Equatorial Guinea U20		
2019–	Equatorial Guinea	24	(1)
- * Club domestic league appearances and goals as of 7 May 2026 ‡ National team caps and goals as of 28 December 2025

Marvin José Anieboh Pallaruelo (born 26 August 1997) is a professional footballer who plays as a centre-back for Singapore Premier League club Tanjong Pagar United. Born in Spain, he represents Equatorial Guinea internationally.

== Early life ==
Anieboh was born in Madrid to a Nigerian Igbo father and an Equatorial Guinean mother. He is of Spanish descent through his maternal grandfather and of Bubi descent through his maternal grandmother.

== Club career ==
After representing AD Alcorcón, Getafe CF and CF Fuenlabrada as a youth, Anieboh made his senior debut for the latter's B-team during the 2016–17 season, in the regional leagues. On 24 June 2017, he was loaned to Tercera División side CD Los Yébenes San Bruno for one year.

On 22 August 2018, Anieboh signed for fellow fourth division side RCD Carabanchel. Ahead of the 2018–19 campaign, he signed for another reserve team, AD Alcorcón B also in division four.

Anieboh made his first team debut for Alkor on 17 December 2019, starting in a 0–1 away loss against CP Cacereño, for the season's Copa del Rey.

Anieboh joined Singapore Premier League club Tanjong Pagar United on 12 August 2026.

== International career ==
Due to his background, Anieboh was eligible to play internationally for Spain, Nigeria or Equatorial Guinea. After representing the latter's under–20s in 2015, he received his first senior call in October 2016 for a friendly match against Lebanon, but he did not play.

Anieboh returned to the Equatorial Guinean squad in 2019 and made his debut on 19 November that year, in a 0–1 loss to Tunisia at the 2021 Africa Cup of Nations qualification Group J.
