= Seiya Satsukida =

Japanese footballer

Personal information
- Date of birth: 18 April 2002 (age 24)
- Place of birth: Nagasaki, Japan
- Height: 1.72 m (5 ft 8 in)
- Position: Midfielder

Team information
- Current team: FC Jurong
- Number: 7

Youth career
- Nagasaki Rainbow SC
- –2021: V-Varen Nagasaki

Senior career*
Years	Team	Apps	(Gls)
2021–2024	V-Varen Nagasaki	14	(0)
2024	→ Tegevajaro Miyazaki (loan)	9	(0)
2025–2026	Tegevajaro Miyazaki		
- * Club domestic league appearances and goals as of 1 August 2026

Seiya Satsukida (五月田 星矢, Satsukida Seiya; born 18 April 2002) is a Japanese professional footballer who plays as a midfielder.

== Club career ==
Nishino made his professional debut in a 2–1 Emperor's Cup win against Hokkaido Consadole Sapporo.

== Career statistics ==
=== Club ===
As of 7 July 2021.

Club	Season	League			National Cup		League Cup		Other		Total	
Club	Season	Division	Apps	Goals	Apps	Goals	Apps	Goals	Apps	Goals	Apps	Goals
V-Varen Nagasaki	2021	J2 League	0	0	2 (Note: Appearances in the Emperor's Cup)	0	–		0	0	2	0
Career total			0	0	2	0	0	0	0	0	2	0
