= Miki Lladó =

Spanish football manager

Personal information
- Full name: Miquel Lladó Plana
- Date of birth: 6 June 1989 (age 37)
- Place of birth: Sant Cugat del Vallès, Spain

Team information
- Current team: Tanjong Pagar United (manager)

Youth career
- Junior

Senior career*
Years	Team	Apps	(Gls)
- Junior

Managerial career
- 2011–2014: Sant Cugat (youth)
- 2018–2019: South United
- 2019–2021: Sabadell (youth)
- 2022: Sabadell (assistant)
- 2022–2023: Sabadell
- 2024: Åsane Fotball (women)
- 2025: Forca Kochi
- 2026–: Tanjong Pagar United
- * Club domestic league appearances and goals

Miquel "Miki" Lladó Plana (born 6 June 1989) is a Spanish football manager who is the head coach of the Singapore Premier League club Tanjong Pagar United. Before, he was the head coach of CE Sabadell in the Spanish third-tier between December 2022 and October 2023.

== Career ==
Born in Sant Cugat del Vallès, Barcelona, Catalonia, Lladó played for hometown side Junior FC, and began his career with the youth categories of Sant Cugat FC, being in charge of their Cadete and Juvenil squads. In 2014, he left the club and moved to India, and started working at Anantapur Sports Academy.

On 20 October 2018, Lladó was appointed manager of I-League 2nd Division side South United FC. The following 28 February, after failing to win any of the club's first five matches into the season, he was sacked.

In March 2019, Lladó returned to his home country and joined CE Sabadell FC, being named manager of the Juvenil B squad. He was appointed at the helm of the Juvenil A team for the 2019–20 campaign, and renewed his contract on 1 June 2020 after achieving promotion to División de Honor Juvenil.

On 2 July 2021, after a top-6 finish in a league campaign that included wins against FC Barcelona and RCD Espanyol, Lladó left his role to work in the International Area of the Arlequinats. He departed the club in March of the following year to work in the United States, but returned in July 2022, after becoming Gabri's assistant.

On 22 December 2022, Lladó replaced Gabri as manager of Sabadell. He made his debut in charge of the club the following 8 January, in a 1–0 Primera Federación home win over Bilbao Athletic.

On 3 July 2023, after leading the club to a 10th position in the campaign earning 32 points in 21 matchdays (losing only five games), Lladó renewed his contract with Sabadell for a further year. However, the new season started badly, with the team knocked out of Copa Catalunya and Copa Federación against lower league opposition. He was sacked after collecting only seven points in the first seven league games of the 2023–24 season.

In January 2024, Lladó moved to Norway to work as a coach developer at Åsane Fotball. As the women's team of the club was struggling in the 2024 Toppserien, he was appointed head coach in the summer. When he took over in August, the team had not won any game in 16 matchdays and had only 6 points. Although the team improved under his guidance, earning 12 points in the last 11 games of the regular season and winning three of them, relegation was confirmed losing on penaltis against FK Bodø/Glimt Kvinner in the play-offs after drawing 0-0 at home and 1-1 away.

On 8 September 2025, Lladó returned to men's game as he was named manager of Super League Kerala club Forca Kochi. He left on 11 November after losing the six first games of the season.

On 11 August 2026, Lladó was named manager of Singapore Premier League club Tanjong Pagar United.

== Managerial statistics ==
As of 21 November 2026

Managerial record by team and tenure
Team	Nat	From	To	Record								Ref
Team	Nat	From	To	G	W	D	L	GF	GA	GD	Win %	Ref
South United	(India)	20 October 2018	28 February 2019	5	0	2	3	5	12	−7	0.00	
Sabadell	(Spain)	22 December 2022	9 October 2023	30	10	9	11	34	30	+4	33.33	
Åsane Fotball (women)	(Norway)	23 August 2024	24 November 2024	13	3	5	5	10	13	−3	23.08	
Forca Kochi	(India)	10 September 2025	11 November 2025	6	0	0	6	4	15	−11	0.00	
Tanjong Pagar United	(Singapore)	11 August 2026	Present	7	3	1	3	11	18	−7	42.86	
Career total				61	16	17	28	64	88	−24	26.23	—
