= Álex Masogo =

Equatoguinean footballer (born 2001)

Personal information
- Full name: Alejandro Martín Masogo
- Date of birth: 26 January 2001 (age 25)
- Place of birth: Madrid, Spain
- Height: 1.75 m (5 ft 9 in)
- Position: Defender

Team information
- Current team: Tanjong Pagar United
- Number: 18

Youth career
- 2014–2018: Atlético Madrid
- 2018–2020: Getafe

Senior career*
Years	Team	Apps	(Gls)
2020–2021	Mirandés B	8	(0)
2021–2022	Inter de Madrid	10	(0)
2022–2024	Leganés	0	(0)
2022–2023	→ Pontevedra (loan)	16	(0)
2023–2024	→ Melilla (loan)	9	(0)
2024	San Fernando	13	(1)
2025	Yeclano	11	(0)
2025–2026	Beroe	14	(0)
2026–	Tanjong Pagar United	6	(1)

International career^{‡}
2025–	Equatorial Guinea	3	(1)
- * Club domestic league appearances and goals as of 30 October 2026 (UTC) ‡ National team caps and goals as of 18:55, 30 October 2026 (UTC)

Alejandro Martín Masogo (born 26 January 2001) is a professional footballer who plays as midfielder for Singapore Premier League club Tanjong Pagar United. Born in Spain, he plays for the Equatorial Guinea national team.

== Career ==
Masogo is a youth product of Atlético Madrid and Getafe, before beginning his senior career with Mirandés B in 2020. He followed that up with a year-long stint with Inter de Madrid. On 1 September 2022, he joined Leganés on a contract until 2024 and immediately went to Pontevedra on a year-long loan. On 17 July 2023, he again went on loan, this time to Melilla. On 1 February 2024, he joined San Fernando for the second half of the 2023–24 season. On 8 January 2025, he joined Yeclano.

On 14 July 2025, Masogo joined Beroe.

Masogo joined Singapore Premier League club Tanjong Pagar United on 14 September 2026.

== International career ==
Masogo debuted with Equatorial Guinea in a 1–1 friendly tie with Cameroon on 6 June 2025, scoring his side's only goal.
