= Benoît Salviat =

French footballer (born 1978)

Personal information
- Date of birth: March 6, 1978 (age 48)
- Place of birth: Bordeaux, France
- Height: 1.69 m (5 ft 7 in)
- Positions: Midfielder; forward

Youth career
- –1995: Bordeaux

Senior career*
Years	Team	Apps	(Gls)
1995–1999	Bordeaux B		
1999–2000	Saint Bordelais		
2000–2001	Saint-Médard		
2001–2002	Naval 1 de Maio		
2002–2003	A.S. Vénus		
2003–2004	SS Saint-Louisienne		
2004	Tanjong Pagar United		
2004–?	FC Bassin d'Arcachon		
- * Club domestic league appearances and goals

Benoît Salviat (born 6 March 1978) is a French former footballer who played as a midfielder and forward.

== Career ==
=== Tahiti ===
Playing for Tahitian club A.S. Vénus, Salviat claimed that the level of football in Tahiti was essentially amateur, with three to four full-time players in the lineup.

=== Reunion ===
Salviat went to Reunion to trial for SS Saint-Louisienne in 2003, making his league debut in a league round facing US Stade Tamponnaise.

=== Singapore ===
Upon in Singapore with Tanjong Pagar United in 2004, Salviat stated that unrelenting heat there wore him out and made him constantly tired. He then left Singapore in winter that year after making some appearances.
