= Yuki Aizu =

Japanese footballer

Personal information
- Date of birth: 1 August 1996 (age 30)
- Place of birth: Setagaya, Japan
- Height: 1.73 m (5 ft 8 in)
- Position: Defender

Team information
- Current team: Shan United
- Number: 7

Youth career
- Seijo Champ SC
- MIP FC
- –2014: Kashiwa Reysol

College career
Years	Team	Apps	(Gls)
2015–2018	University of Tsukuba		

Senior career*
Years	Team	Apps	(Gls)
2019–2020	FC Gifu	15	(0)
2021	Linköping City	21	(0)
2022	Pirin Blagoevgrad	6	(0)
2023–2025	Hwaseong FC	0	(0)
2025–	Shan United	0	(0)

International career^{‡}
2013	Japan U17	4	(0)
Medal record
Representing Japan
AFC U-16 Championship
Silver medal – second place	2012 Iran
- * Club domestic league appearances and goals as of 5 March 2023 ‡ National team caps and goals as of 30 May 2019

Yuki Aizu (会津 雄生, Aizu Yūki) is a Japanese professional footballer born on August 1, 1996, in Setagaya, Tokyo, Japan.

== Youth career ==
Aizu started playing football in his first year at Chitose Elementary School with Seijo Champ SC and after MIP FC, he joined Kashiwa Reysol's academy from the end of the fifth grade of elementary school until he graduated from high school. In May 2014, when he was a member of the Kashiwa U-18 team, he was registered in the first team as a second-class player. He was not promoted to the first team after graduating from high school and went to the University of Tsukuba, where he was a regular in his first year, and in his second year, due to team conditions, he switched from side-half to side-back.

== Senior career ==
He joined FC Gifu in 2019. He decided to join the club after being attracted to the football of coach Takeshi Ohki, with whom he had interacted during his time with the national team for the age group, and made his professional debut on 24 February, playing in the 73rd minute of the opening game against Montedio Yamagata.
