= 1996 Geylang United FC season =

Geylang United FC
1996 season
- Chairman: (Singapore) Patrick Ang
- Ground: Bedok Stadium
- S.League: Champions
- Singapore FA Cup: Champions

The 1996 S.League season was Geylang United's 1st season in the top flight of Singapore football and 21st year in existence as a football club. Geylang emerged the winner of Series 1 (Tiger Beer Series) and finished fifth in Series 2 (Pioneer Series). It qualified for the Championship Playoff and won the inaugural S.League season. It also won the inaugural Singapore FA Cup.

== Review ==
Geylang United was selected as part of the eight teams to participate in the inaugural S.League season. Fandi Ahmad returned as team captain.

Geylang won the Series 1 (Tiger Beer Series) and qualified for the Championship Playoff at the end of the season. However, Geylang finished fifth in Series 2 (Pioneer Series). During the Championship Playoff, Geylang defeated Singapore Armed Forces Football Club (SAFFC) 2–1 to emerge champions of the inaugural season of S.League and qualified for the 1997–98 Asian Club Championship.

In the inaugural Singapore FA Cup, Geylang defeated SAFFC again, 4–2, in a penalty shootout after a 1–1 draw in normal time and extra time.

== Squad ==
=== Sleague ===
No.	Name	Nationality	Date of birth (age)	Previous club
Goalkeepers
1	David Lee	(Singapore)	10 April 1958 (age 67)	Singapore FA
	Shahri Rahim	(Singapore)		
Defenders
5	Borhan Abu Samah	(Singapore)	30 November 1964 (age 61)	Singapore FA
7	Mohammad Khakpour	(Iran)	20 February 1969 (age 57)	(Iran) Persepolis F.C.
12	Zulkarnaen Zainal	(Singapore)	1 October 1973 (age 52)	Youth Team
13	Kamaruddin Ismail	(Singapore)		
16	Kadir Yahaya	(Singapore)	15 February 1968 (age 58)	Singapore FA
18	Robin Chitrakar	(Singapore)	2 October 1976 (age 49)	(Singapore) Balestier United
	R. Sasikumar	(Singapore)		
Midfielders
10	Syed Faruk	(Singapore)	11 February 1967 (age 59)	Singapore FA
14	Hamid Estili	(Iran)	1 April 1967 (age 58)	(Kuwait) Qadsia SC
	Chris Riley	(New Zealand)	19 August 1964 (age 61)	
Strikers
17	Fandi Ahmad	(Singapore)	26 May 1962 (age 63)	Singapore FA
23	Zlatko Vidan	(Croatia)	22 June 1966 (age 59)	
	Mohsen Garousi	(Iran)	28 November 1968 (age 57)	(Iran) PAS Tehran F.C.

== S.League ==
Pos	Team	Pld	W	D	L	GF	GA	GD	Pts	Qualification
1	Geylang United	14	9	1	4	27	14	+13	28	Qualification to S.League Championship play-off match
2	Woodlands Wellington	14	8	2	4	25	20	+5	26	
3	Balestier Central	14	7	3	4	22	18	+4	24	
4	Singapore Armed Forces	14	5	3	6	27	25	+2	18	
5	Tiong Bahru United	14	4	5	5	20	19	+1	17	
6	Police FC	14	4	5	5	22	23	−1	17	
7	Sembawang Rangers	14	3	4	7	17	32	−15	13	
8	Tampines Rovers	14	3	3	8	18	27	−9	12	

Source: RSSSF
Rules for classification: 1) points; 2) goal difference; 3) number of goals scored

Pos	Team	Pld	W	D	L	GF	GA	GD	Pts	Qualification
1	Singapore Armed Forces	14	9	5	0	32	14	+18	32	Qualification to S.League Championship play-off match
2	Tiong Bahru United	14	8	3	3	35	18	+17	27	
3	Balestier Central	14	7	3	4	25	19	+6	24	
4	Woodlands Wellington	14	6	3	5	29	25	+4	21	
5	Geylang United	14	6	3	5	20	16	+4	21	
6	Sembawang Rangers	14	4	3	7	14	23	−9	15	
7	Tampines Rovers	14	2	2	10	10	28	−18	8	
8	Police FC	14	2	2	10	18	40	−22	8	

Source: RSSSF
Rules for classification: 1) points; 2) goal difference; 3) number of goals scored

=== Tiger Beer Series ===
20 April 1996 1	(Singapore) Geylang United	3–0	(Singapore) Sembawang Rangers	(Singapore) Bedok Stadium
19:30 (UTC+8)

24 April 1996 2	(Singapore) Geylang United	0–1	(Singapore) Woodlands Wellington	(Singapore) Bedok Stadium
19:30 (UTC+8)

26 April 1996 3	(Singapore) Tiong Bahru United	1–3	(Singapore) Geylang United	(Singapore) Queenstown Stadium
19:30 (UTC+8)

30 April 1996 4	(Singapore) Geylang United	3–1	Singapore Armed Forces	(Singapore) Bedok Stadium
19:30 (UTC+8)

3 May 1996 5	Singapore Armed Forces	1–3	(Singapore) Geylang United	(Singapore) Jurong Stadium
19:30 (UTC+8)

7 May 1996 6	(Singapore) Geylang United	0–1	(Singapore) Balestier Central	(Singapore) Bedok Stadium
19:30 (UTC+8)

11 May 1996 7	(Singapore) Tampines Rovers	2–0	(Singapore) Geylang United	(Singapore) Tampines Stadium
19:30 (UTC+8)

17 May 1996 8	(Singapore) Police	1–3	(Singapore) Geylang United	(Singapore) Jalan Besar Stadium
19:30 (UTC+8)

21 May 1996 9	(Singapore) Geylang United	3–1	(Singapore) Tampines Rovers	(Singapore) Bedok Stadium
19:30 (UTC+8)

25 May 1996 10	(Singapore) Balestier Central	1–0	(Singapore) Geylang United	(Singapore) Toa Payoh Stadium
19:30 (UTC+8)

28 May 1996 11	(Singapore) Geylang United	1–0	(Singapore) Police	(Singapore) Bedok Stadium
19:30 (UTC+8)

3 June 1996 12	(Singapore) Sembawang Rangers	1–4	(Singapore) Geylang United	(Singapore) Yishun Stadium
19:30 (UTC+8)

7 June 1996 13	(Singapore) Geylang United	2–1	(Singapore) Tiong Bahru United	(Singapore) Bedok Stadium
19:30 (UTC+8)

14 June 1996 14	(Singapore) Woodlands Wellington	1–1	(Singapore) Geylang United	(Singapore) Woodlands Stadium
19:30 (UTC+8)

=== Pioneer Series ===
13 July 1996 15	(Singapore) Geylang United	0–2	Singapore Armed Forces	(Singapore) Bedok Stadium
19:30 (UTC+8)

19 July 1996 16	(Singapore) Balestier Central	2–0	(Singapore) Geylang United	(Singapore) Toa Payoh Stadium
19:30 (UTC+8)

24 July 1996 17	(Singapore) Geylang United	1–1	(Singapore) Woodlands Wellington	(Singapore) Bedok Stadium
19:30 (UTC+8)

27 July 1996 18	(Singapore) Tiong Bahru United	1–1	(Singapore) Geylang United	(Singapore) Queenstown Stadium
19:30 (UTC+8)

6 Aug 1996 19	(Singapore) Sembawang Rangers	1–2	(Singapore) Geylang United	(Singapore) Yishun Stadium
19:30 (UTC+8)

13 August 1996 20	(Singapore) Geylang United	3–0	(Singapore) Tampines Rovers	(Singapore) Bedok Stadium
19:30 (UTC+8)

17 August 1996 21	(Singapore) Police	2–3	(Singapore) Geylang United	(Singapore) Jalan Besar Stadium
19:30 (UTC+8)

20 August 1996 22	(Singapore) Geylang United	4–0	(Singapore) Police	(Singapore) Bedok Stadium
19:30 (UTC+8)

24 August 1996 23	(Singapore) Tampines Rovers	2–1	(Singapore) Geylang United	(Singapore) Tampines Stadium
19:30 (UTC+8)

17 September 1996 24	(Singapore) Geylang United	0–1	(Singapore) Sembawang Rangers	(Singapore) Bedok Stadium
19:30 (UTC+8)

21 September 1996 25	(Singapore) Geylang United	2–0	(Singapore) Tiong Bahru United	(Singapore) Bedok Stadium
19:30 (UTC+8)

28 September 1996 26	(Singapore) Woodlands Wellington	3–1	(Singapore) Geylang United	(Singapore) Woodlands Stadium
19:30 (UTC+8)

5 October 1996 27	(Singapore) Geylang United	1–0	(Singapore) Balestier Central	(Singapore) Bedok Stadium
19:30 (UTC+8)

19 October 1996 28	Singapore Armed Forces	1–1	(Singapore) Geylang United	(Singapore) Jurong Stadium
19:30 (UTC+8)

=== S.League Championship play-off ===
9 November 1996 Final	Singapore Armed Forces	1–2	(Singapore) Geylang United	(Singapore) Kallang Stadium
19:30 (UTC+8)	Eres Jure 52'		Mohammad Khakpour 46'; Hamid Reza Estili 61'
