= 1997 S.League =

S. League
- Season: 1997
- Champions: Singapore Armed Forces; 1st S.League title
- Asian Club Championship: Singapore Armed Forces
- Matches played: 72
- Goals scored: 249 (3.46 per match)
- Top goalscorer: (Croatia) Goran Paulić (21)
- Biggest home win: Tiong Bahru United 5-1 Tampines Rovers (5 July 1997); Singapore Armed Forces 5-1 Balestier Central (8 July 1997)
- Biggest away win: Tampines Rovers 2-8 Balestier Central (28 June 1997)
- Highest scoring: Tampines Rovers 2-8 Balestier Central (28 June 1997)

The 1997 S.League was the 2nd season of the S.League, the top professional football league in Singapore. The format of the league was changed, a single season of home and away matches replacing the split seasons and a playoff model of the 1996 season.

The 1997 S.League championship was won by Singapore Armed Forces FC.

== Teams ==
Police Football Club underwent a rebranding, being renamed as Home United while NFL side Jurong Town Football Club, who renamed themselves Jurong FC, joined the competition taking the number of participating clubs to 9. As a result of the construction of the new Jurong East Stadium being incomplete, Jurong FC used Bukit Gombak Stadium as their home ground for the 1997 S.League season.

Location of teams in 1997 S.League

| Team | Stadium | Capacity | Location |
|---|---|---|---|
| Balestier Central | Toa Payoh Stadium | 3,900 | Toa Payoh |
| Geylang United | Bedok Stadium | 3,900 | Bedok |
| Jurong | Bukit Gombak Stadium | 3,000 | Bukit Batok |
| Home United | Jalan Besar Stadium | 8,000 | Kallang |
| Singapore Armed Forces | Jurong Stadium | 6,000 | Jurong |
| Sembawang Rangers | Yishun Stadium | 3,400 | Yishun |
| Tampines Rovers | Tampines Stadium | 3,600 | Tampines |
| Tiong Bahru United | Queenstown Stadium | 3,800 | Queenstown |
| Woodlands Wellington | Woodlands Stadium | 4,300 | Woodlands |

== Foreign players ==
| Club | Player 1 | Player 2 | Player 3 | Player 4 | Player 5 |
|---|---|---|---|---|---|
| Balestier Central | (Croatia) Goran Paulić | (Croatia) Marko Kraljević | (Croatia) Bojan Hodak | None | None |
| Geylang United | (Iran) Hamid Reza Estili | (Iran) Mohsen Garousi | (Australia) Warren Spink | (Scotland) Martin Tierney | None |
| Home United | (Brazil) Egmar Goncalves | (Brazil) Fabio da Silva | (Hungary) Zsolt Bücs | None | None |
| Jurong FC | (Ghana) Musah Edoe | (Ghana) Tanko Tetumah | (Scotland) Alan McTurk | None | None |
| Singapore Armed Forces | (Croatia) Ivica Raguž | (Croatia) Jure Ereš | (Croatia) Velimir Crljen | (Croatia) Davor Mioč | None |
| Sembawang Rangers | (Croatia) Zlatko Vidan | (Bosnia and Herzegovina) Milomir Šešlija | (Senegal) Ousmane N'Diaye | (Netherlands) Ignacio Tuhuteru | (England) Gary Blissett |
| Tampines Rovers | (Australia) Scott O'Donell | (New Zealand) Chris Jackson | None | None | None |
| Tiong Bahru United | (Senegal) Nicodeme Boucher | (Croatia) Dragan Talajić | (Cameroon) Émile Mbouh | (Sweden) Håkan Söderstjerna | None |
| Woodlands Wellington | (Czech Republic) Jan Janostak | (England) Stuart Young | (England) Max Nicholson | None | None |

== Final table ==
| Pos | Team | Pld | W | D | L | GF | GA | GD | Pts | Qualification |
|---|---|---|---|---|---|---|---|---|---|---|
| 1 | Singapore Armed Forces | 16 | 12 | 1 | 3 | 42 | 11 | +31 | 37 | Qualification to Asian Club Championship first round |
| 2 | Tiong Bahru United | 16 | 10 | 4 | 2 | 33 | 16 | +17 | 34 | |
| 3 | Woodlands Wellington | 16 | 11 | 0 | 5 | 35 | 29 | +6 | 33 | |
| 4 | Balestier Central | 16 | 8 | 4 | 4 | 43 | 26 | +17 | 28 | |
| 5 | Geylang United | 16 | 6 | 7 | 3 | 23 | 18 | +5 | 25 | |
| 6 | Tampines Rovers | 16 | 4 | 3 | 9 | 22 | 38 | −16 | 15 | |
| 7 | Jurong FC | 16 | 4 | 3 | 9 | 15 | 33 | −18 | 15 | |
| 8 | Sembawang Rangers | 16 | 1 | 5 | 10 | 19 | 37 | −18 | 8 | |
| 9 | Home United | 16 | 2 | 1 | 13 | 17 | 41 | −24 | 7 | |

Source: RSSSF
Rules for classification: 1) points; 2) goal difference; 3) number of goals scored

== Top scorers ==
| Rank | Name | Club | Goals |
|---|---|---|---|
| 1 | (Croatia) Goran Paulić | Balestier Central | 21 |
| 2 | (Brazil) Egmar Goncalves | Home United | 15 |
| 3 | (Croatia) Jure Ereš | Singapore Armed Forces | 14 |
