= 1996 S.League =

S.League
- Season: 1996
- Champions: Geylang United; 1st S.League title
- Asian Club Championship: Geylang United
- Matches: 113
- Goals: 364 (3.22 per match)
- Top goalscorer: (Croatia) Jure Ereš (28)
- Biggest home win: Singapore Armed Forces 5-0 Tampines Rovers (27 July 1996); Tiong Bahru United 5-0 Sembawang Rangers (19 October 1996)
- Biggest away win: Police FC 0-5 Tiong Bahru United (5 October 1996)
- Highest scoring: Singapore Armed Forces 6-2 Sembawang Rangers (11 May 1996); Police FC 3-5 Woodlands Wellington (19 October 1996)

The 1996 S.League was the 1st season of the S.League, the top professional football league in Singapore.

The S.League came into existence as a result of a fragmenting of relations between Singapore and Malaysian football associations. A dispute over the division of gate receipts for the Singapore representative in the Malaysian Premier League saw Singapore withdraw from the competition in 1995, ending a footballing connection between the two nations that stretched back to 1921, with the first participation of a Singapore team in the Malaya Cup.

The semi-professional FAS Premier League was founded in 1988, but had failed to find support amongst the local communities and media. The S.League was therefore created to fill the need to have a fully professional football league within Singapore. The Football Association of Singapore invited applications for clubs to compete in the newly formed league. Eight successful applications were made, these eight teams took part in a two-stage league season, with the winner of each stage qualifying for the end of season championship decider. The first half of the season was known as the Tiger Beer Series and the second half was known as the Pioneer Series.

Geylang United defeated Singapore Armed Forces FC in the end of season championship Playoff to be crowned the 1st S.League champions.

== Clubs ==
Eight sides took part in the first S.League campaign; two of whom had been competitors in the former Singapore Premier League. These former Premier League clubs were Balestier United FC who changed their name upon joining the S.League to Balestier Central and the former Singapore Premier League powerhouse Geylang International, winners of six back-to-back Premier League titles, who renamed themselves Geylang United for the first S.League season. The rest were clubs drawn from the amateur National Football League: Police, Singapore Armed Forces, Tampines Rovers, Tiong Bahru United and Wellington Football Club, who renamed themselves Woodlands Wellington.

Sembawang Rangers were formed from a merger between two NFL sides, Gibraltar Crescent and Sembawang Sports Club.

Location of teams in 1996 S.League

Team	Stadium	Capacity	Location
Balestier Central	Toa Payoh Stadium	3,900	Toa Payoh
Geylang United	Bedok Stadium	3,900	Bedok
Police	Jalan Besar Stadium	8,000	Kallang
Singapore Armed Forces	Jurong Stadium	6,000	Jurong
Sembawang Rangers	Yishun Stadium	3,400	Yishun
Tampines Rovers	Tampines Stadium	3,600	Tampines
Tiong Bahru United	Queenstown Stadium	3,800	Queenstown
Woodlands Wellington	Woodlands Stadium	4,300	Woodlands

== Foreign players ==
Club	Player 1	Player 2	Player 3	Player 4	Player 5
Balestier Central	(Federal Republic of Yugoslavia) Ljutvo Bugucanin	(Croatia) Goran Paulić	(Croatia) Marko Kraljević	(Federal Republic of Yugoslavia) Esad Sejdic	(Liberia) Nathaniel Klay Naplah
Geylang United	(Iran) Mohammad Khakpour	(Iran) Hamid Reza Estili	(New Zealand) Chris Riley	(Croatia) Zlatko Vidan	(Iran) Mohsen Garousi
Police	(Brazil) Egmar Goncalves	(Brazil) Fabio da Silva	(Brazil) Joao Batista Neto	(Brazil) Sergio Cleveland	(Brazil)
Singapore Armed Forces	(Croatia) Ivica Raguž	(Croatia) Jure Ereš	(Croatia) Velimir Crljen	(Croatia) Davor Mioč	(Croatia) Goran Grubesic
Sembawang Rangers	(Brazil) Anderson Da Silva	(Hungary) Laszlo Kardos	(New Zealand) Mark Atkinson	(Senegal) Ousmane N'Diaye	
Tampines Rovers	(Hungary) Nagy Gabor	(Brazil) Marco Antonio	(Australia) Scott O'Donell	(Ghana) Seidu Suleiman Anas	(Croatia) Nikolic Miroslav
Tiong Bahru United	(Australia) Vlado Bozinoski	(Slovakia) Tibor Szaban	(Australia) David Miller	(Australia) Pedro Ricoy	(Australia) Ivan Kelic
Woodlands Wellington	(Croatia) Ervin Boban	(Croatia) Sandro Radun	(Czech Republic) Jan Janostak	(Australia) Joe Caleta	(England) Steven Rocknean

== League tables ==
=== Series 1 (Tiger Beer Series) ===
Pos	Team	Pld	W	D	L	GF	GA	GD	Pts	Qualification
1	Geylang United	14	9	1	4	27	14	+13	28	Qualification to S.League Championship play-off match
2	Woodlands Wellington	14	8	2	4	25	20	+5	26	
3	Balestier Central	14	7	3	4	22	18	+4	24	
4	Singapore Armed Forces	14	5	3	6	27	25	+2	18	
5	Tiong Bahru United	14	4	5	5	20	19	+1	17	
6	Police FC	14	4	5	5	22	23	−1	17	
7	Sembawang Rangers	14	3	4	7	17	32	−15	13	
8	Tampines Rovers	14	3	3	8	18	27	−9	12	

Source: RSSSF
Rules for classification: 1) points; 2) goal difference; 3) number of goals scored

=== Series 2 (Pioneer Series) ===
Pos	Team	Pld	W	D	L	GF	GA	GD	Pts	Qualification
1	Singapore Armed Forces	14	9	5	0	32	14	+18	32	Qualification to S.League Championship play-off match
2	Tiong Bahru United	14	8	3	3	35	18	+17	27	
3	Balestier Central	14	7	3	4	25	19	+6	24	
4	Woodlands Wellington	14	6	3	5	29	25	+4	21	
5	Geylang United	14	6	3	5	20	16	+4	21	
6	Sembawang Rangers	14	4	3	7	14	23	−9	15	
7	Tampines Rovers	14	2	2	10	10	28	−18	8	
8	Police FC	14	2	2	10	18	40	−22	8	

Source: RSSSF
Rules for classification: 1) points; 2) goal difference; 3) number of goals scored

=== S.League Championship Playoff ===
9 November 1996

Singapore Armed Forces	1–2	Geylang United
Jure Ereš 52'		Mohammad Khakpour 46'; Hamid Reza Estili 61'

Singapore National Stadium, Kallang
Attendance: 30,000

The Geylang United victory in the Championship Playoff saw them qualify for the 1997–98 Asian Club Championship. This was the first Singaporean representation in the Asian Club Championship since 1991–92, when Geylang International participated in 1st Round qualifying. Geylang were comfortably defeated by 1996 J.League champions Kashima Antlers in the first round of the East Asian half of the competition, Kashima finishing with an 8–2 aggregate win.

== Top scorers ==
Rank	Name	Club	Goals
1	(Croatia) Jure Ereš	Singapore Armed Forces	28
2	(Croatia) Goran Paulić	Balestier Central	22
3	(Brazil) Egmar Goncalves	Police	19
