= 1999 S.League =

4th season of the S.League

S. League
- Season: 1999
- Champions: Home United; 1st S.League title
- Asian Club Championship: Home United
- Matches: 132
- Goals: 410 (3.11 per match)
- Top goalscorer: (Croatia) Mirko Grabovac (23)
- Biggest home win: Singapore Armed Forces 7-0 Woodlands Wellington (17 April 1999)
- Biggest away win: Clementi Khalsa 0-6 Balestier Central (19 May 1999)
- Highest scoring: Tampines Rovers 4-4 Gombak United (24 September 1999)

The 1999 S.League was the fourth season of the S.League, the top professional football league in Singapore. Teams played each other once home and away, in a 22-match season.

The 1999 S.League was won by Home United, their first S.League title.

== Teams ==
The league expanded again to 12 teams with the addition of a newly formed team, Clementi Khalsa who were based in Clementi and played their home games at the Clementi Stadium. Clementi Khalsa were formed in order to give an S.League representation to the Singaporean Sikh community.

Location of teams in 1999 S.League

| Team | Stadium | Capacity | Location |
|---|---|---|---|
| Balestier Central | Toa Payoh Stadium | 3,900 | Toa Payoh |
| Geylang United | Bedok Stadium | 3,900 | Bedok |
| Gombak United | Bukit Gombak Stadium | 3,000 | Bukit Batok |
| Clementi Khalsa | Clementi Stadium | 4,000 | Clementi |
| Jurong | Jurong East Stadium | 2,700 | Jurong East |
| Home United | Bishan Stadium | 4,000 | Bishan |
| Marine Castle | Hougang Stadium | 3,000 | Hougang |
| Singapore Armed Forces | Jurong Stadium | 6,000 | Jurong |
| Sembawang Rangers | Yishun Stadium | 3,400 | Yishun |
| Tampines Rovers | Tampines Stadium | 3,600 | Tampines |
| Tanjong Pagar United | Queenstown Stadium | 3,800 | Queenstown |
| Woodlands Wellington | Woodlands Stadium | 4,300 | Woodlands |

== Foreign players ==
Each club is allowed to have up to a maximum of 4 foreign players.

| Club | Player 1 | Player 2 | Player 3 | Player 4 | Former Player |
|---|---|---|---|---|---|
| Balestier Central | (Australia) Darren Stewart | (Brazil) Fabio Da Silva | (England) Paul Richardson | None | None |
| Clementi Khalsa | (Romania) Bogdan Brasoveanu | (England) Paul Masefield | (England) Raymond Williamson | None | None |
| Geylang International | (Brazil) Jacksen F. Tiago | (England) Gareth Rowe | (England) Billy Bone | (Germany) Lutz Pfannenstiel | (New Zealand) Jason Batty (South Korea) Jang Jung |
| Gombak United | (Denmark) Jorgen Nielsen | (Thailand) Surachai Jirasirichote | (Australia) David Cervinski | (Australia) Ben Blake | None |
| Home United | (Australia) Ernie Tapai | (Australia) Vlado Bozinoski | (Brazil) Egmar Gonçalves | (Hungary) Zsolt Bucs | None |
| Jurong FC | (Croatia) Bojan Hodak | (England) Jason Ainsley | (England) Keith Fletcher | None | None |
| Marine Castle | (Australia) Douglas Ithier | (England) Michael Currie | (Nigeria) Peter Anosike | None | None |
| SAFFC | (Croatia) Mirko Grabovac | (Croatia) Tomislav Steinbruckner | (Croatia) Vinko Marača | None | None |
| Sembawang Rangers | (Thailand) Tawan Sripan | (Brazil) Joselito Da Silva | (Croatia) Jure Ereš | (Bosnia and Herzegovina) Milomir Šešlija | None |
| Tampines Rovers | (Croatia) Marko Kraljevic | (Australia) Scott O'Donell | (Liberia) Nathaniel Klay Naplah | (Croatia) Zlatko Vidan | None |
| Tanjong Pagar United | (Croatia) Davor Dželalija | (Croatia) Dejan Gluščević | (Croatia) Dragan Talajić | (Senegal) Nicodeme Boucher | (Brazil) Fabio Da Silva (Australia) Aleksandar Đurić |
| Woodlands | (Germany) Jörg Steinebrunner | (Croatia) Ivica Raguz | (England) Stuart Young | (England) Max Nicholson | (England) Christian Sansam |

== League table ==
| Pos | Team | Pld | W | D | L | GF | GA | GD | Pts | Qualification |
|---|---|---|---|---|---|---|---|---|---|---|
| 1 | Home United | 22 | 15 | 6 | 1 | 42 | 16 | +26 | 51 | Qualification to Asian Club Championship first round |
| 2 | Singapore Armed Forces | 22 | 14 | 7 | 1 | 63 | 24 | +39 | 49 | |
| 3 | Tanjong Pagar United | 22 | 11 | 8 | 3 | 40 | 25 | +15 | 41 | |
| 4 | Geylang United | 22 | 9 | 8 | 5 | 33 | 21 | +12 | 35 | |
| 5 | Gombak United | 22 | 8 | 8 | 6 | 35 | 35 | 0 | 32 | |
| 6 | Jurong FC | 22 | 9 | 4 | 9 | 37 | 32 | +5 | 31 | |
| 7 | Balestier Central | 22 | 6 | 8 | 8 | 25 | 27 | −2 | 26 | |
| 8 | Sembawang Rangers | 22 | 5 | 8 | 9 | 30 | 36 | −6 | 23 | |
| 9 | Woodlands Wellington | 22 | 6 | 4 | 12 | 30 | 44 | −14 | 22 | |
| 10 | Tampines Rovers | 22 | 4 | 8 | 10 | 25 | 39 | −14 | 20 | |
| 11 | Clementi Khalsa | 22 | 3 | 6 | 13 | 29 | 55 | −26 | 15 | |
| 12 | Marine Castle United | 22 | 3 | 3 | 16 | 21 | 56 | −35 | 12 | |

Source: RSSSF
Rules for classification: 1) points; 2) goal difference; 3) number of goals scored

As 1999 S.League champions, Home United qualified to compete in the 2000–01 Asian Club Championship. This was their first appearance in continental competition. The club reached the second round of the East Asian half of the competition, defeating Polícia de Segurança Pública of the Campeonato da 1ª Divisão do Futebol 11–0 on aggregate before being defeated 6–1 on aggregate in the second round by Shandong Luneng Taishan of the Chinese Jia-A League.

== Top scorer ==
| Rank | Name | Club | Goals |
|---|---|---|---|
| 1 | (Croatia) Mirko Grabovac | Singapore Armed Forces | 23 |
