= 1998 President's Centennial Cup =

Tournament details
- Country: Philippines
- Venues: 2
- Dates: March 7–15, 1998
- Teams: 8

Final positions
- Champions: (Singapore) Woodlands Wellington (1st title)
- Runners-up: Hong Kong Rangers
- Third place: (Singapore) Sembawang
- Fourth place: Philippines

Tournament statistics
- Matches played: 16
- Goals scored: 55 (3.44 per match)

The 1998 President's Centennial Football Cup was a football tournament held in Iloilo City and Bacolod, Philippines. It is organized by the Philippine Football Federation in honor of Philippine president Fidel V. Ramos.

It is the second edition of the President's Cup with this iteration held as part of the Philippine Centennial celebrations.

== Group stage ==
=== Group A ===
Team	Pld	W	D	L	GF	GA	GD	Pts	Result
(Singapore) Woodlands Wellington	3	2	0	1	4	2	+2	6	Semifinals
Philippines	3	2	0	1	4	3	+1	6	Semifinals
(Chinese Taipei) Tatung	3	2	0	1	3	2	+1	6	
(Malaysia) Malay Mail	3	0	0	3	1	5	−4	0	

Source: RSSSF
Rules for classification: 1) Points, 2) Goal difference, 3) Goals for
March 7, 1998

Philippines	0–1	(Chinese Taipei) Tatung
	Report	Wu Chin-i 76'

Iloilo Sports Complex, Iloilo City
March 7, 1998

Woodlands Wellington (Singapore)	1–0	(Malaysia) Malay Mail
Saad 80'	Report 1, 2

Iloilo Sports Complex, Iloilo City
Referee: Jerry Andres

March 9, 1998

Philippines	2–1	(Malaysia) Malay Mail
Piñero 24'; Rosell 40' (pen.)	Report	T. Naidu 18'

Iloilo Sports Complex, Iloilo City
March 9, 1998

Woodlands Wellington (Singapore)	2–0	(Chinese Taipei) Tatung
Janošťák 17', 41'	Report

Iloilo Sports Complex, Iloilo City

March 11, 1998

Philippines	2–1	(Singapore) Woodlands
Saluria 3'; Fegidero 57'	Report	Richardson 4'

Iloilo Sports Complex, Iloilo City
Attendance: 2,000
March 11, 1998

Tatung (Chinese Taipei)	2–0	(Malaysia) Malay Mail

Iloilo Sports Complex, Iloilo City

=== Group B ===
Team	Pld	W	D	L	GF	GA	GD	Pts	Result
Hong Kong Rangers	3	3	0	0	10	0	+10	9	Semifinals
(Singapore) Sembawang	3	2	0	1	9	1	+8	6	Semifinals
(Thailand) Royal Thai Air Force	3	1	0	2	7	4	+3	3	
(Philippines) All-Visayas	3	0	0	3	0	21	−21	0	

Source: RSSSF
March 8, 1998

Sembawang (Singapore)	0–1	Hong Kong Rangers
		Shunwai Yin-Lun 56'

Iloilo Sports Complex, Iloilo City
March 8, 1998

All-Visayas (Philippines)	0–7	(Thailand) Royal Thai Air Force

Iloilo Sports Complex, Iloilo City

March 10, 1998

Sembawang (Singapore)	1–0	(Thailand) Royal Thai Air Force
Šešlija 87'	Report 1, 2

Iloilo Sports Complex, Iloilo City
Referee: Teodolo Segundo
March 10, 1998

All-Visayas (Philippines)	0–6	Hong Kong Rangers
	Report	Edward (3x)

Iloilo Sports Complex, Iloilo City

March 12, 1998

Hong Kong Rangers	3–0	(Thailand) Royal Thai Air Force

Iloilo Sports Complex, Iloilo City
March 12, 1998

All-Visayas (Philippines)	0–8	(Singapore) Sembawang
	Report	Zlatko (3x); Ndiaye (2x); Šešlija; Asri; Lai Thim Yip

Iloilo Sports Complex, Iloilo City

== Knockout stage ==
=== Semi-finals ===
March 14, 1998

Philippines	0–4	Hong Kong Rangers
	Report	Tam Kwai Kok 2'; Gerard 14'; Vorfa 61'; ?

Negros Occidental Sports Stadium, Bacolod
Attendance: 3,000

March 14, 1998

Woodlands Wellington (Singapore)	4–2	(Singapore) Sembawang
	Report

Negros Occidental Sports Stadium, Bacolod

=== Bronze medal match ===
March 15, 1998

Philippines	1–3	(Singapore) Sembawang
Viliran 11'	Report	Vidan 51', 81'; Alam Shah 72'

Negros Occidental Sports Stadium, Bacolod

=== Gold medal match ===
March 15, 1998

Woodlands Wellington (Singapore)	2–1	Hong Kong Rangers
R. Ahmad 9', 41'	Report 1, 2	Gerard 86'

Negros Occidental Sports Stadium, Bacolod
Attendance: 5,000

== Player awards ==
- Most Valuable Player: (Singapore) Mohd Mardani (Woodland)
- Most Valuable Goalkeeper: (Singapore) Ismail Matsuk (Woodland)
