= Goh Tat Chuan =

Singaporean footballer and engineer

Goh Tat Chuan 吴达泉
Personal information
- Full name: Goh Tat Chuan
- Date of birth: 6 February 1974 (age 52)
- Place of birth: Singapore
- Height: 1.80 m (5 ft 11 in)
- Position: Midfielder

Senior career*
Years	Team	Apps	(Gls)
1996	Sembawang Rangers		
1997–2001	Jurong		
2002–2006	Woodlands Wellington	138	(5)

International career
2001–2006	Singapore	29	(0)
- * Club domestic league appearances and goals

Goh Tat Chuan (simplified Chinese: 吴达泉; traditional Chinese: 吳達泉; pinyin: Wú Dá Quán; born 6 February 1974) is a former Singapore football player. A midfielder, he spent most of his time at Woodlands Wellington and was the 10th captain of the club.

He graduated from St Joseph's Institution and the Nanyang Technological University and was one of the few players in the Singapore national soccer team to have a degree. During his time in the S-League, his passing skills and ability as a holding midfielder earned him a reputation as one of the best midfielders in the league and even in the region.

Goh retired from professional football on 6 January 2007 to concentrate on his career as a commercial engineer.

== Club career ==
A software engineer, Goh pursued his football passion on a part-time basis by making his S.League debut in 1996 with Sembawang Rangers.

When Jurong FC entered the 1997 S.League, Goh made the switch over to the Cobras where he played for three seasons. It was his convincing performances in the middle of the park for Jurong which prompted Singapore coach Barry Whitbread to call him up to play for the Singapore national team in 2001.

Having made his name as a no-nonsense anchorman at Jurong FC, Goh moved to rivals Woodlands Wellington in time for the 2002 S.League season together with fellow Cobra A. Siva Kumar.

It was at Woodlands where Goh's career really flourished. Following the departure of Simon Clark at the end of the 2004 S.League season, Goh was handed the captain's armband, becoming the tenth captain in Woodlands' history i the process. He continued to play for Woodlands and made a total of 138 appearances for the Rams until his retirement in early 2007.

== International career ==
A player with impeccable vision on the field, Goh made his international debut for the Singapore Lions on 22 May 2001 in a friendly against New Zealand.

He played in both the 2002 and 2004 Tiger Cups and was notably sent off in the second group match against Laos in 2002. Singapore was subsequently knocked out at the group stage of the tournament. However, he redeemed himself in the 2004 edition after forming a remarkable partnership in central midfield alongside Hasrin Jailani as Singapore won the tournament that year.

In 2006, he had a feud with national team coach, Radojko Avramovic, after he was dropped from the national team after failing to observe a curfew together with his Woodlands Wellington teammate, Masrezwan Masturi. This cause a huge uproar as the two players were dropped two days before the Asian Cup qualifying round opener against Iraq.

Because of his refusal to give Avramovic a public apology, he was never picked to play for the national team again since that incident.

== Honours ==
=== International ===
Singapore

- ASEAN Football Championship: 2004
