= Kervin Godon =

Mauritian footballer

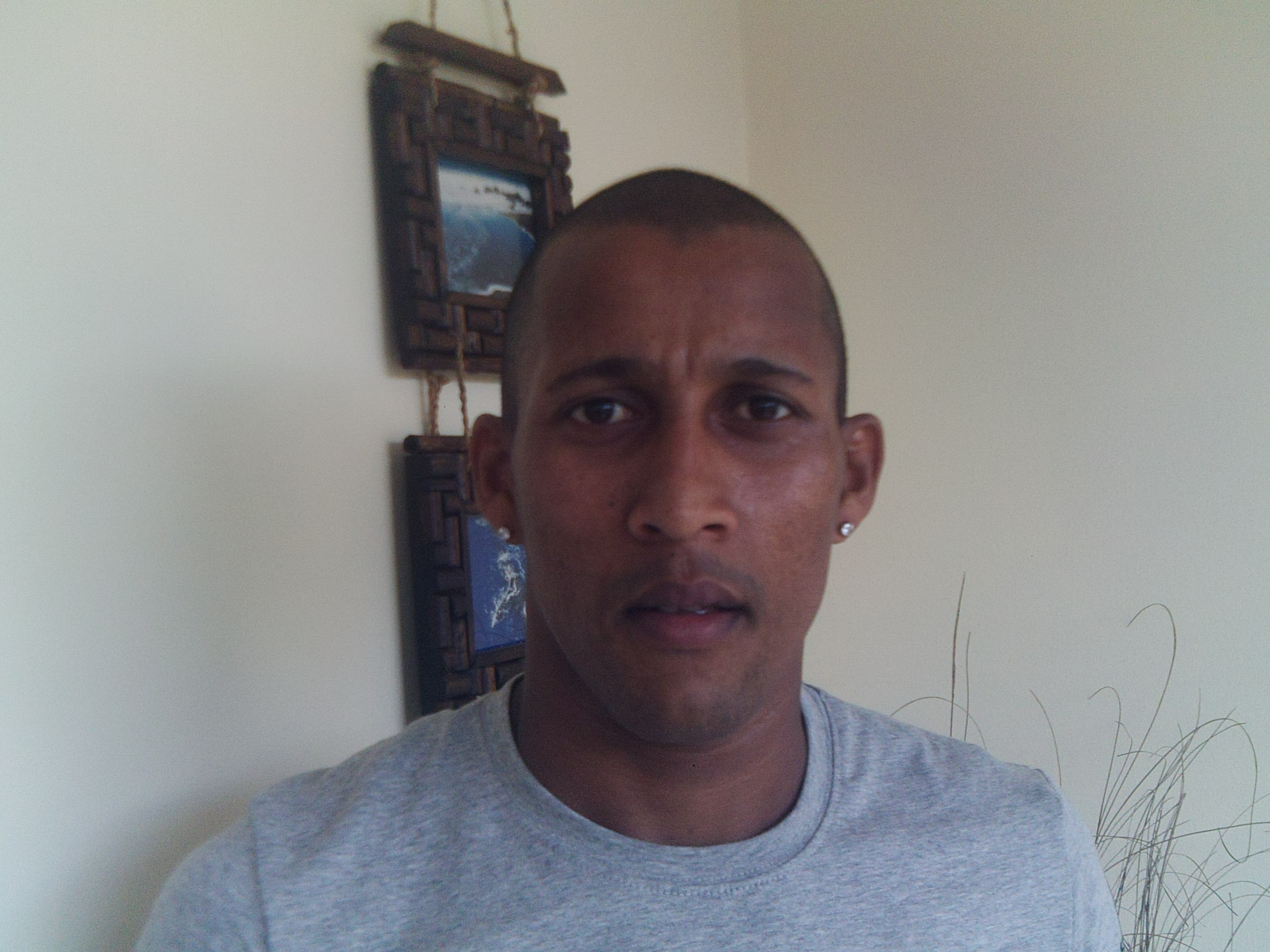

Personal information
- Full name: Kervin Godon
- Date of birth: 11 April 1981 (age 45)
- Place of birth: Port Louis, Mauritius
- Height: 5 ft 9 in (1.75 m)
- Position: Midfielder

Senior career*
Years	Team	Apps	(Gls)
2001–2005	AS Port-Louis 2000	?	(?)
2005–2011	Saint-Denis FC	?	(?)
2011–2012	AS Possession	26	(2)
2013–	Saint-Denis FC	4	(0)

International career
2002–2011	Mauritius	33	(2)
- * Club domestic league appearances and goals

Kervin Godon (born 11 April 1981) is a Mauritian international footballer who plays as a midfielder for Saint-Denis FC in the Réunion Premier League and for the Mauritius national football team.

== Career statistics ==
=== International ===
Appearances and goals by national team and year
National team	Year	Apps	Goals
Mauritius	2002	4	0
Mauritius	2003	2	0
Mauritius	2004	–	
Mauritius	2005	3	0
Mauritius	2006	6	2
Mauritius	2007	8	0
Mauritius	2008	1	0
Mauritius	2009	–	
Mauritius	2010	2	0
Mauritius	2011	7	0
Total		33	2

Scores and results list Mauritius's goal tally first, score column indicates score after each Godon goal.

List of international goals scored by Kevin Godon
No.	Date	Venue	Opponent	Score	Result	Competition
1	26 June 2006	People's Stadium, Victoria, Seychelles	Tanzania	1–1	1–2	2006 Seychelles Tri-Nations Tournament
2	7 October 2006	Stade Linité, Victoria, Seychelles	Seychelles	1–1	1–2	2008 Africa Cup of Nations qualification
