= Gervais Randrianarisoa =

Malagasy footballer

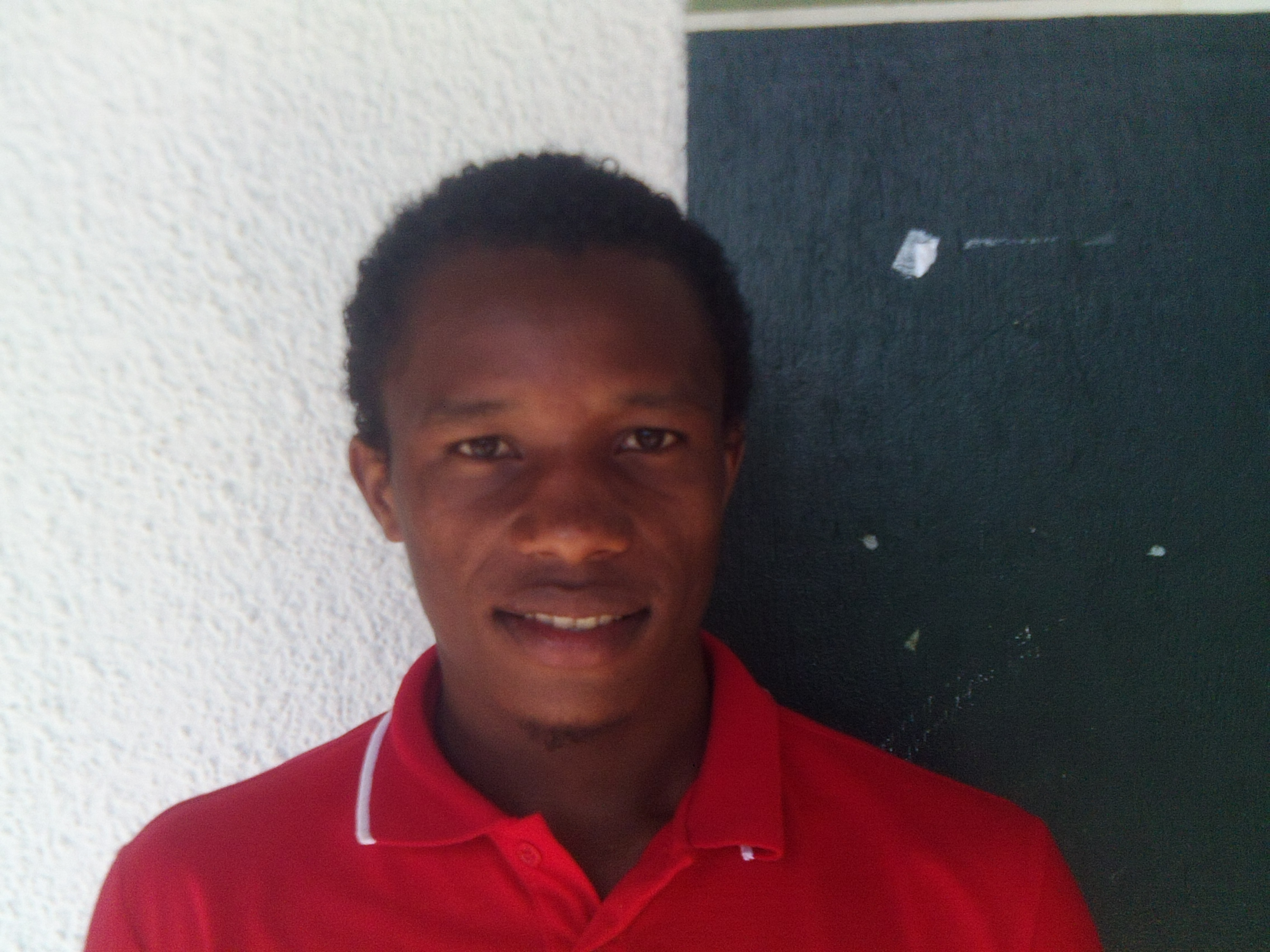

Personal information
- Full name: Mamy Gervais Nirina Randrianarisoa
- Date of birth: November 7, 1984 (age 41)
- Place of birth: Antsirabe, Madagascar
- Height: 1.83 m (6 ft 0 in)
- Position: Centre back

Team information
- Current team: JS Saint-Pierroise
- Number: 15

Senior career*
Years	Team	Apps	(Gls)
2005	FC Antsaniony		
2006–2009	Ajesaia		
2010–2011	AJ Petite-Île		
2012–2014	AS Possession		
2014–	JS Saint-Pierroise		

International career^{‡}
2005–2022	Madagascar	52	(0)
- * Club domestic league appearances and goals ‡ National team caps and goals as of 5 June 2022

Mamy Gervais Nirina Randrianarisoa (born 7 November 1984) is a Malagasy footballer who plays as a centre back for Réunionnais club JS Saint-Pierroise and the Madagascar national team.

== Career ==
He previously playing for Malagasy clubs FC Antsaniony and Ajesaia, in Réunion for AJ Petite-Île and AS Possession.

=== International ===
Randrianarisoa has played 26 matches and scored a goal for Madagascar.

== Honours ==
Ajesaia

- THB Champions League: 2007, 2009
- Super Coupe de Madagascar: 2007, 2009
- Coupe de Madagascar: 2006

Saint-Pierroise

- Réunion Premier League: 2016,2017,2018,2019
- Coupe de la Réunion: 2018, 2019

Madagascar

- Football at the Indian Ocean Island Games silver medal:2007
- Knight Order of Madagascar: 2019
