= Esad Sejdic =

Personal information
- Place of birth: Yugoslavia
- Position: Striker

Senior career*
Years	Team	Apps	(Gls)
- Novi Pazar
1992–1993	Perak		
1993–1994	Negeri Sembilan		
1994–1995	Hong Kong Rangers		
1996	Balestier Central		
1997	Woodlands Wellington		
2000	Tampines Rovers		(5)
2001	Woodlands Wellington		

Managerial career
- 2014: Admiralty FC
- * Club domestic league appearances and goals

Esad Sejdic is a Yugoslavian former footballer who played as a forward.

== Football career ==
Back in 1996, Singaporean club Balestier Central got the attackers' services where he scored the first-ever S.League goal, netting it in a match confronting Police FC. One week later, he made the S.League's first hat-trick in a 4–1 win, with his club coming third by the end of the season. Signing for Woodlands Wellington in 1997 with Croatian Sandro Radun, their applications were rejected by the Singapore Football Association; in response, they asked FIFA to allow their documents, who in turn forced the Association to repay the player, with Sejdic's extra money amounting to 40700 Singaporean dollars. The S.League supporters also wrote splenetic responses to the newspaper, saying that Sejdic should play.

Violating Muslim ordinance by being in the same house with an Islamic woman without being a Muslim himself, the Yugoslavian was released by Negeri Sembilan in 2004.

== Other ==
Owning three to four restaurants in Singapore, two went bankrupt in 2015 and he had to reduce one restaurants staff to four full-timers in 2016 following the hookah ban.
