= Masoud Estili =

Iranian football player

Personal information
- Full name: Masoud Estili
- Date of birth: 21 September 1969
- Place of birth: Tehran, Iran
- Date of death: 27 March 2011 (aged 41)
- Place of death: Tehran, Iran

Senior career*
Years	Team	Apps	(Gls)
- Bahman
- Keshavarz
- PAS Tehran
- Persepolis

International career^{‡}
- Iran
- * Club domestic league appearances and goals ‡ National team caps and goals as of 19:00, 10 Dec 2014 (UTC)

Masoud Estili (Persian: مسعود استیلی (21 September 1969 – 27 March 2011) was an Iranian football player. He also played for the Iran national futsal team in the 1996 FIFA Futsal World Championship. He was the younger brother of Hamid Estili.
