= Hamid Estili =

Iranian football player (born 1967)

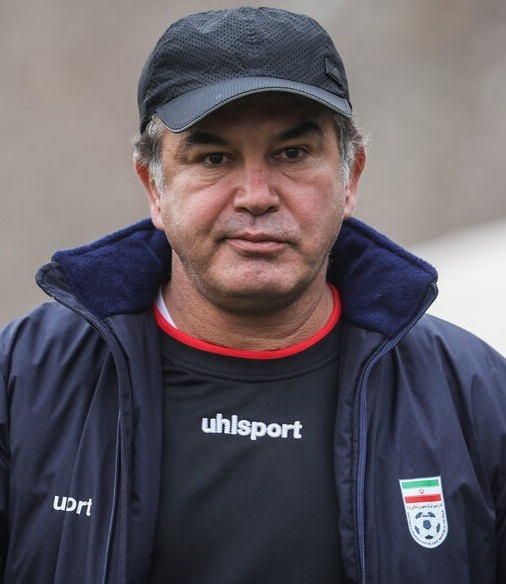
- Estili in 2019

Personal information
- Full name: Hamid Reza Estili
- Date of birth: 1 April 1967 (age 59)
- Place of birth: Tehran, Iran
- Height: 5 ft 9 in (1.75 m)
- Position: Midfielder

Youth career
- Esteghlal Jonub

Senior career*
Years	Team	Apps	(Gls)
1987–1992	Pas	6	(9)
1992–1994	Persepolis	20	(1)
1994–1998	Bahman	30	(8)
1995	→ Al Qadisia (loan)		
1996	→ Geylang United (loan)	60	(4)
1997	→ Geylang United (loan)	9	(12)
1998–2004	Persepolis	98	(9)

International career
1992–2000	Iran	82	(12)

Managerial career
- 2004–2008: Persepolis (Assistant)
- 2009–2010: Steel Azin
- 2010–2011: Shahin Bushehr
- 2011: Persepolis
- 2014–2015: Rah Ahan
- 2015–2016: Malavan
- 2019–2021: Iran U23
Medal record
Representing Iran
AFC Asian Cup
Bronze medal – third place	1996 United Arab Emirates	Team competition
Asian Games
Gold medal – first place	1998 Bangkok	Team competition
- * Club domestic league appearances and goals

Hamid Reza Estili (Persian: حميد رضا استيلی; born 1 April 1967) is an Iranian football coach and former player. Estili was a member of the Iran national team and is mostly remembered for his memorable goal and goal celebration against the United States at the 1998 FIFA World Cup.

== Early life ==
Estili was born on 1 April 1967 in Nazi Abad, Tehran. His father was a businessman and his mother a nurse. He began his football playing career with Pas Tehran in 1982.

== Club career ==
Estili played for Al Qadisiya Kuwait, Bahman, Esteghlal Jonoub, Geylang United and Pas. His best years were spent at Persepolis.

After the 1998 FIFA World Cup he signed for FK Austria Wien, however due to unforeseen circumstances, he returned to Iran and played the remaining six years of his career at his beloved Persepolis FC.

In the famous Tehran derby played in 2000, he fought with Mohammad Navazi at the end of the match and was arrested by police. They were imprisoned in Qasr Prison for three days. He was suspended for the rest of the season.

He retired from competitive club football in 2004.

== International career ==
Estili started playing football from an early age and was able to impress, eventually being called up the Iran football team. At age 23, he made his debut versus the USSR. He was known as the workhorse of the national team but is mostly remembered for his memorable goal and goal celebration in a match against USA at the 1998 FIFA World Cup. In 2015, he donated the jersey he wore in that match to the FIFA World Football Museum in Zürich, Switzerland.

Estili retired from international football after match against South Korea in 2000. He had 82 caps and 12 goals for the national team.

== Coaching career ==
=== Assistant coach of Persepolis ===
Estili was appointed as assistant coach for Persepolis FC in 2004, as the assistant of Ali Parvin, and then Rainer Zobel. A few months after Arie Haan was chosen as the Head coach, he was sacked by him. After Haan left the team in August 2006, and Mustafa Denizli was signed as the head coach, Estili returned to his former position. On 13 January 2007, during the 2006–07 mid-season break, Estili left the team being sacked again, this time by Denizli due to problems with him. Denizli later stated that "It would be better for him to take some professional trainings", and Estili Compared Denizli's contract with the Treaty of Turkmenchay.

Estili was the assistant coach to Afshin Ghotbi, the head-coach of the club in the IPL 2007/08 season. However, with a lot of tension between the two coaches over the team selection, players, and other decisions it was foreseen that one of them will have to leave Perspolis F.C. at the end of the season. Ghotbi left at the end of the season, and Estili was touted as the new Perspolis manager. However, with Ghotbi's return, Estili left Perspolis.

=== Steel Azin ===
Estili was appointed as the head coach of the new promoted team Steel Azin in summer of 2009 and had many starts such as Ali Karimi, Mehdi Mahdavikia, Hossein Kaebi, Fereydoon Zandi, Amir Shapourzadeh and Alireza Vahedi Nikbakht but after failing to progress in Hazfi Cup and totally missing the chance of winning the league he was sacked on 19 April 2010.

On 20 September 2009; in the half time break of the match against Esteghlal, he experienced a squeal with Fereydoon Zandi. Zandi threw a bottle toward him, and Estili then slapped Zandi. The incident led to a fight.

=== Shahin Bushehr ===
Estili was appointed Head Coach of Shahin Bushehr on 1 June 2010 and was fired on 4 April 2011, replaced by Mahmoud Yavari. at the time he was sacked, Shahin were in 17th place out of 18, achieving 16 points in 18 matches.

=== Return to Persepolis as head coach ===
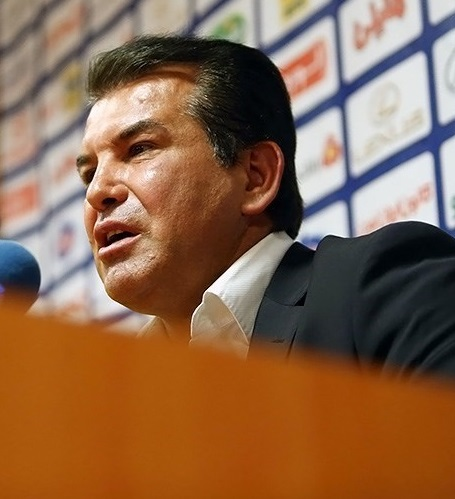
Estili in press conference

On 1 June 2011, it was announced that Estili was one of the candidates for coaching Persepolis, alongside Hamid Derakhshan and the current coach, Hazfi Cup winner Ali Daei. Chairman of the club, Habib Kashani, launched a "Technical Committee" consisting of Bijan Zolfagharnasab, Mohammad Panjali and Mohammad Zadmehr to select the next coach among the three. Daei exposed his proposal for 2011–12 season to the club, but he was unable to remain in the club due to tensions with Habib Kashani. Technical Committee stated a condition for Daei: "Daei Should communicate properly with Kashani", which he rejected. On 21 June 2011, Estili was selected as head coach of Persepolis by "The Technical Committee".

Some fans believed that the Technical Committee was a show from Kashani to pull over Daei, and select his "beloved friend" Estili. In a Poll by Navad, 68% believed that "Estili won't be successful with Persepolis".

In the opening match of the season against Malavan, which ended 1–1 after the weak performance of Persepolis and late tying goal by Hossein Badamaki, fans started screaming the name of Ali Daei since 60th minute, showing their displeasure. protests continued in next matches by Booing Estili and Kashani, and slogans wanting them to leave the club. In a poll by Navad on 15 August 2011, 51% believed that the way Estili was chosen is the main reason of protests. Other reasons included weak performance by players (36%) and impatient fans (%13).

He led Persepolis in the 15 matches with five won, five defeats and five draws. He finally resigned on 9 December 2011 after a 3–0 home defeat to arch rivals Esteghlal in quarter-finals of 2011–12 Hazfi Cup.

On 27 November 2012, he was appointed as Persepolis Academy's Director by Mohammad Rouyanian.

=== Rah Ahan ===
On 26 June 2014, Estili was named as new manager of Rah Ahan.

== Personal life ==
His younger brother, Masoud, was also a footballer and died in April 2011 after an accident.

Estili is an Iranian Azari. His father was born in Baku, Soviet Union and his mother is from Sarab. He was married in 1999 with Anahita Zahraee and has two daughters, Atena (born 2002) and Anita (born 2005). They are currently living in Saadat Abad.

== Career statistics ==
=== Club ===
Appearances and goals by club, season and competition
Club	Season	League			Cup		Continental		Other		Total	
Club	Season	Division	Apps	Goals	Apps	Goals	Apps	Goals	Apps	Goals	Apps	Goals
Persepolis	1992–93	Azadegan League	15	0	0	0	8	1	6 (Note: Six appearances, two goals in Tehran Super League)	2	29	3
Persepolis	1993–94	Azadegan League	5	1	1	0	4	0	–		10	1
Persepolis	Total		20	1	1	0	12	1	6	2	39	4
Bahman FC	1994–95	League 2 (Iran)	0	0	0	0	0	0	–		0	0
Qadsia SC (loan)	1994–95	Kuwait Premier League	0	0	0	0	0	0	–		0	0
Geylang United (loan)	1996	S.League	0	0	0	0	0	0	–		0	0
Geylang United (loan)	1997	S.League	0	0	0	0	0	0	–		0	0
Persepolis	1998–99	Azadegan League	18	4	6	0	-	-	–		24	4
Persepolis	1999–00	Azadegan League	21	2	1	0	7	0	–		29	2
Persepolis	2000–01	Azadegan League	11	2	0	0	9	2	–		20	4
Persepolis	2001–02	Iran Pro League	16	0	4	0	-	-	–		20	0
Persepolis	2002–03	Iran Pro League	20	1			3	0	–			
Persepolis	2003–04	Iran Pro League	12	0			-	-	–			
Persepolis	Total		98	9	5	0	19	2	0	0	122	11
Career total			118	10	12	0	31	3	6	2	167	15

=== International ===
Appearances and goals by national team and year
National team	Year	Apps	Goals
Iran	1992	1	0
Iran	1993	11	2
Iran	1996	16	1
Iran	1997	18	4
Iran	1998	17	1
Iran	1999	6	0
Iran	2000	13	4
Total		82	12

Scores and results list Iran's goal tally first, score column indicates score after each Estili goal.

List of international goals scored by Hamid Estili
No.	Date	Venue	Opponent	Score	Result	Competition
1	25 June 1993	Azadi Stadium, Tehran, Iran	Chinese Taipei	1–0	6–0	1994 FIFA World Cup qualification
2	4 July 1993	Abbasiyyin Stadium, Damascus, Syria	Chinese Taipei	6–0	6–0	1994 FIFA World Cup qualification
3	14 June 1996	Azadi Stadium, Tehran, Iran	Oman	2–0	2–0	1996 AFC Asian Cup qualification
4	2 June 1997	Abbasiyyin Stadium, Damascus, Syria	Maldives	4–0	17–0	1998 FIFA World Cup qualification
5	2 June 1997	Abbasiyyin Stadium, Damascus, Syria	Maldives	7–0	17–0	1998 FIFA World Cup qualification
6	2 June 1997	Abbasiyyin Stadium, Damascus, Syria	Maldives	8–0	17–0	1998 FIFA World Cup qualification
7	2 September 1997	Al Nahyan Stadium, Abu Dhabi, United Arab Emirates	United Arab Emirates	1–2	1–3	Friendly
8	21 June 1998	Stade de Gerland, Lyon, France	United States	1–0	2–1	1998 FIFA World Cup
9	31 March 2000	Al-Hamadaniah Stadium, Aleppo, Syria	Maldives	4–0	8–0	2000 AFC Asian Cup qualification
10	13 April 2000	Azadi Stadium, Tehran, Iran	Maldives	2–0	3–0	2000 AFC Asian Cup qualification
11	12 October 2000	Camille Chamoun Sports City Stadium, Beirut, Lebanon	Lebanon	2–0	4–0	2000 AFC Asian Cup
12	12 October 2000	Camille Chamoun Sports City Stadium, Beirut, Lebanon	Lebanon	3–0	4–0	2000 AFC Asian Cup

== Managerial statistics ==
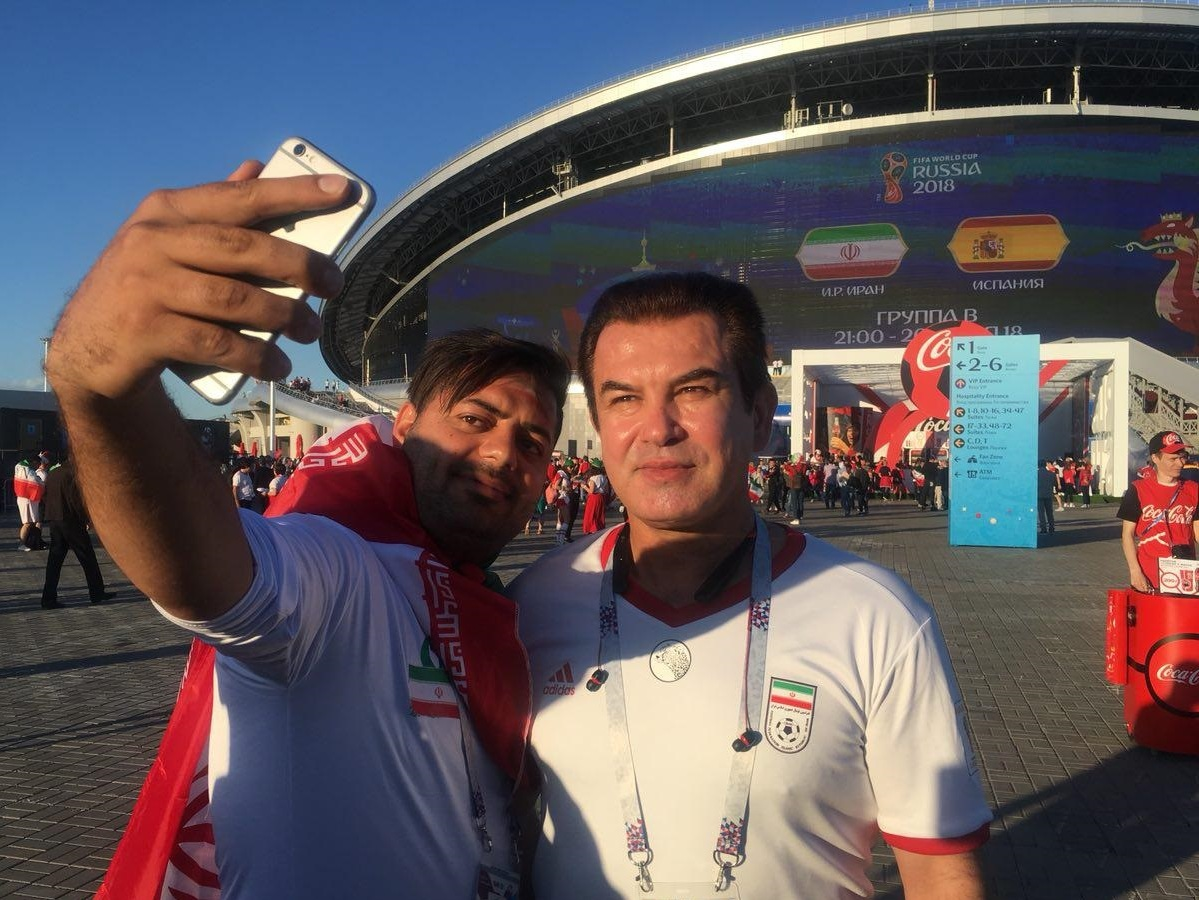
Estili before watching Iran's match at 2018 FIFA World Cup

As of 13 February 2016

Team	From	To	Record							
Team	From	To	G	W	D	L	Win %	GF	GA	+/-
Steel Azin	July 2009	April 2010	34	15	11	8	44.12	60	51	+9
Shahin Bushehr	June 2010	April 2011	28	6	9	13	21.43	25	31	−6
Persepolis	June 2011	December 2011	18	7	5	6	38.89	23	23	0
Rah Ahan	June 2014	February 2015	20	5	5	10	25.00	18	29	–11
Malavan	August 2015	February 2016	21	5	7	9	23.81	16	21	–5
Total			122	38	38	46	34.50	143	155	–13

== Honours ==
Pas

- Iranian Football League: 1991–92

Bahman

- Hazfi Cup: 1994–95

Persepolis

- Asian Cup Winners' Cup: runner-up 1992–93
- Iranian Football League: 1998–99, 1999–2000, 2001–02
- Hazfi Cup: 1998–99

Iran

- Asian Games Gold Medal: 1998
