= Mohd Mardani =

Singaporean footballer (born 1972)

Mohamed Mardani
Personal information
- Full name: Mohamed Fatahollah Mardani
- Date of birth: 12 October 1972 (age 54)
- Place of birth: Singapore
- Position: Defender

Team information
- Current team: Balestier Khalsa FC

Senior career*
Years	Team	Apps	(Gls)
2004–2005	Home United	23	(0)
- * Club domestic league appearances and goals as of 14:25, 19 June 2008 (UTC)

Mohamed Fatahollah Mardani (born 12 October 1972) is a Singaporean footballer, who currently plays for the club Balestier Khalsa FC. He is currently 54 years of age. Mohamed formerly played for another Singaporean club, Woodlands Wellington from 1996 to 1999. In 2003, he signed up for another Singaporean club, Home United where he stayed until 2005. In 2006, he began playing with the club Balestier Khalsa FC.
