= Ignacio Tuhuteru =

Dutch footballer

Personal information
- Date of birth: 23 August 1973 (age 53)
- Place of birth: Zaandam, Netherlands
- Position: Left winger

Youth career
- –1993: Ajax

Senior career*
Years	Team	Apps	(Gls)
1993–1995	Ajax	1	(0)
1994–1995	→ RBC Roosendaal (loan)	31	(5)
1995–1996	Dalian Wanda	36	(2)
1997	Sembawang Rangers	10	(1)
1998–2000	FC Zwolle	54	(22)
2000–2001	SC Heerenveen	15	(1)
2001–2004	FC Groningen	75	(11)
2004–2006	Go Ahead Eagles	56	(6)
- * Club domestic league appearances and goals

Ignacio Tuhuteru (born 23 August 1973) is a Dutch retired footballer who played as a winger for Ajax, RBC Roosendaal, Dalian Haichang, Sembawang Rangers, FC Zwolle, SC Heerenveen, FC Groningen and Go Ahead Eagles.

== Personal life ==
He is of Moluccan-Indonesian origin.
