= Zsolt Bücs =

Hungarian footballer and coach

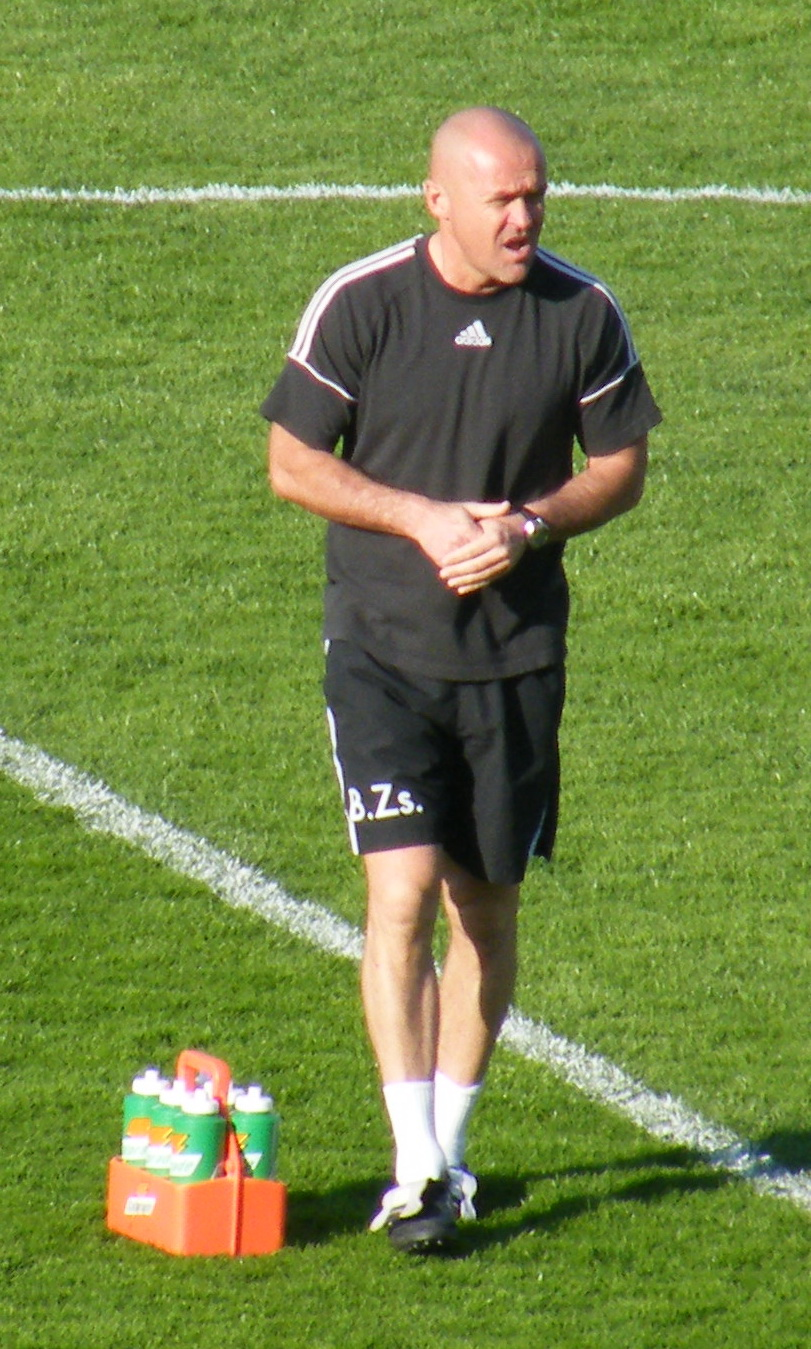
- Bücs coaching Debreceni in 2009

Personal information
- Date of birth: 8 September 1963 (age 63)
- Place of birth: Mátészalka, Hungary
- Height: 1.80 m (5 ft 11 in)
- Position: Midfielder

Team information
- Current team: Pénzügyőr (Manager)

Senior career*
Years	Team	Apps	(Gls)
1983–1984	Nyiregyhaza VSSC		
1984–1988	Debreceni VSC		
1988–1990	Győri ETO FC		
1990–1991	Vasas SC		
1991	Volán FC		
1992	Nyiregyhaza VSSC		
1992–1993	Budapest Előre		
1993	Shimshon Tel Aviv		
1993–1994	Selangor FA		
1995	Tennis Borussia Berlin		
1995–1996	Kecskeméti TE		
1996	Pécsi MFC		
1997	Budapest Előre		
1997	Pahang FA		
1997–1999	Home United		
2000	Oslip		

International career
1990	Hungary	2	(0)

Managerial career
- 2000–2001: Dunakeszi (assistant)
- 2001–2002: Törekvés
- 2002–2003: Kistarcsai
- 2003–2004: Dabas (assistant)
- 2004: Dabas (interim)
- 2005: Unione
- 2006: Home United
- 2007–2011: Debreceni (assistant)
- 2012: Soproni (assistant)
- 2012–2013: Soproni
- 2013: Ebes
- 2014–2015: Békéscsaba (assistant)
- 2014–2015: III. Kerületi
- 2015–2016: Ajka
- 2017–2019: Debreceni (assistant)
- 2019–2020: MTK Budapest (assistant)
- 2020: Mezőkövesdi (assistant)
- 2021: Debreceni (youth team)
- 2021: Dabas
- 2021–2025: Sopron
- 2025–: Pénzügyőr
- * Club domestic league appearances and goals

Zsolt Bücs (born 8 September 1963 in Mátészalka, Hungary) is a football coach and former football midfielder from Hungary.

Reportedly, Bücs was one of the highest-paid S.League players, earning $21,500 Singaporean dollars a month.

== Playing career ==
=== Home United ===
Known for his role as a playmaker and his eye for a pass, Bücs later career ended in Singapore where he helped the S.League club to a mid-table finish in 1998. He was then named Home United captain for the 1999 season where he secured the title with the Protectors becoming the first foreign captain to lift the trophy where the Hungarian's season was further embellished by earning the 1999 S.League 'Player of the Year' Award. However, he was not congruent with his management in terms of his wage package, leaving the club for this reason by the 2000 S.League and then moving off to Austria before finally retiring.

== Managerial career ==
After his retirement, Bücs took up a role in coaching where he became the assistant manager in his home country for club Dunakeszi.

=== Selangor ===
In July 1993, Bücs moved to Southeast Asia to signed with Malaysian club Selangor FA. He then helped the club to win the 1993 Liga Semi-Pro Divisyen 2 title thus gaining promotion to the top flight.

=== Törekvés ===
On 5 September 2001, Bücs became the manager of Törekvés. He left the club on 19 September 2002.

=== Kistarcsai ===
On 20 September 2002, Bücs signed for Kistarcsai as the club manager.

=== Dabas ===
On 30 October 2003, Bücs joined Dabas as the club assistant manager. He was then promoted as interim manager on 26 March 2004 until the end of the season

=== Unione ===
On 15 July 2005, Bücs joined Unione as the club manager.

=== Home United ===
Bücs then moved to Singapore after seven years to coach his former club, Home United where he officially became the manager on 13 January 2006. He added Singaporean fullback Zahid Ahmad and Malian defender Bah Mamadou to his lineup, as well as midfielders Rosman Sulaiman, Firdaus Salleh and Hungarian Gabor Boer. He was in charge on his first game for the club on 10 March losing 2–1 in the Uniform Derby to SAFFC. On 21 March, Bücs guided the club to a 1–0 away win at the Mong Kok Stadium during the 2006 AFC Cup group stage fixtures against Hong Kong club Xiangxue Sun Hei. He then guided Home United to a second victory in the tournament against Maldives club New Radiant in a 2–0 win on 25 April. Bücs left the club at the end of the season where he guided Home United to a fourth place finished in the league and also a third place finished in the 2006 AFC Cup group stages.

=== Debreceni ===
In December 2007, Bücs was recruited by Debreceni as the club assistant manager. In 2011, while working as an assistant coach, he was then given an opportunity to be the head coach of the youth team throughout the year.

=== Újpest ===
On 13 March 2012, Bücs was recruited by Újpest to be the club head of scout.

=== Soproni ===
On 28 March 2012, Bücs then returned to coaching management where he was recruited by Soproni to be the club assistant manager under Imre Soós. After Soós was sacked by the club for poor performances on 14 October 2012, Bücs then become the caretaker for the club where he manage the club on 13 October against Szigetszentmiklósi. He then become the permanent manager for Soproni on 15 October.

== Honours ==
=== Club ===
==== Selangor FA ====
- Liga Semi-Pro Divisyen 2: 1993

==== Tennis Borussia Berlin ====
- Berliner Landespokal: 1995, 1996

=== Individual ===
- S.League Player of the Year: 1999
