= Nazi Abad =

Neighborhood in Tehran, Iran

Nazi Abad (Persian: نازی‌آباد) is a neighborhood to the south of the central district of the city of Tehran in Iran.

This neighborhood was named "Nazi Abad", after the original "Naz Abad" neighborhood during the Qajar era.

Past residents include Hamid Reza Estili (Persian: حميد استیلی), actor Akbar Abdi (Persian: اکبر عبدی), Fereshteh Karimi (Persian: فرشته کریمی) Footballwoman, Yahya Golmohammadi (Persian: یحیی گل‌محمدی) Football coach, and Meysam Nassiri (Persian: میثم نصیری) Wrestler.
