= Nicodeme Boucher =

Senegalese footballer and coach

Personal information
- Date of birth: 20 November 1966 (age 59)
- Height: 1.97 m (6 ft 6 in)
- Position: Forward

Senior career*
Years	Team	Apps	(Gls)
1986–1990	Bourges 18		
- Vierzon FC
- Kaizer Chiefs
1992–1996	US Possession		
1997–2000	Tanjong Pagar United		
2001–2003	SS Saint-Louisienne		
2004	Tanjong Pagar United		(1)
2004–2007	AC Excelsior		

Managerial career
- ?–2009: AC Excelsior
- FC Agen
- US Creysse
- 2014–2016: Agen
- * Club domestic league appearances and goals

Nicodeme Boucher (born 20 November 1966) is a Senegalese football coach and former player. With his height, 1.97 meters high at the time, he was known for being the tallest player in the S.League in his time; he was also known for his goalscoring talent.

== Career ==
=== Reunion ===
Aged 20, the Senegalese striker signed for FC Bourges, a team that oscillated between the French second and third divisions at the time. Then, Boucher moved to Vierzon FC, a club within the French fourth tier. Following a one-year spell at Kaizer Chiefs, Boucher was contacted by an agent who offered him a club in Reunion, US Possession where he scored 18 goals on average each season.

=== S.League ===
After spending four seasons with US Possession, he trialed with Tiong Bahru F.C. at the end of 1996. Dutch coach Robert Alberts decided to sign the then 28-year old, who responded with 5 goals in 4 games and double figures by the end of the season. Soon, however, the forward returned to Reunion Island for "personal reasons" in 1998. Eventually, Tohari Paijan, the new Tanjong Pagar United coach, went to Reunion Island which induced Boucher to return mid-season. Throughout the remainder of the season, he scored 11 goals which catapulted the Jaguars to a Singapore Cup and Singapore FA Cup double. In 1999, Boucher rejoined US Possession but returned to Tanjong Pagar and formed a so-called 'Twin Tower' attacking partnership with countryman Boubacar Seck, scoring 11 goals in 13 appearances. However, his time at Tanjong Pagar would be hampered by a fight with Warriors FC player Tan Kim Leng which led to one-year ban from playing in Singapore. Instead, the attacker was snapped up by SS Saint-Louisienne, winning the 2001 and 2002 Reunion Premier League titles as well as participating in the 2002 and 2003 CAF Champions League campaigns with the club. At the age of 37, Boucher made one final return to Tanjong Pagar, netting one goal. On account of knee injury, he was released after a few months and spent some time recovering, followed by a four-season spell with AC Excelsior.

== Personal life ==
His brother, Jules, is also a former footballer.

== Coaching licenses ==
- UEFA 'A' License

== Honors ==
- Singapore Cup: 1998
- Singapore FA Cup: 1998
