= Ljutvo Bogućanin =

Yugoslav footballer

Personal information
- Date of birth: 1966 (age 59–60)
- Place of birth: Yugoslavia
- Height: 1.82 m (6 ft 0 in)
- Position: Defender

Senior career*
Years	Team	Apps	(Gls)
1988–1989	Novi Pazar	30	(1)
1996	Balestier Central		

Managerial career
- 2009: Novi Pazar (caretaker)
- * Club domestic league appearances and goals

Ljutvo Bogućanin is a Yugoslavian retired footballer who played as a defender.

== Career ==
Unofficially making his debut for Balestier Central in a friendly facing Malaysian side Perak, Bogućanin said that he wanted to stay at the Singaporean club until the cessation of his football career.
