= Martin Tierney =

Scottish footballer

Personal information
- Date of birth: 4 April 1966 (age 60)
- Place of birth: Glasgow, Scotland
- Position: Central midfielder

Youth career
- 1984–1988: Ayr United

Senior career*
Years	Team	Apps	(Gls)
1989–1991	Bohemians		
1991	Kilkenny City		
1991–1992	Stranraer		
1993–1994	PDRM FA		
1995	Penang		
1996	Houston Hotshots		
1997	Geylang International FC		
1998	Connecticut Wolves		
1999–2000	Tulsa Roughnecks		
- * Club domestic league appearances and goals

Martin Tierney (born 4 April 1966) is a Scottish TV pundit and former professional footballer.

== Playing career ==
Tierney started his career in the youth ranks alongside Alan McInally at Ayr United. In four years with the club, Tierney never made a first team appearance. He then moved to play in Ireland for a number of Irish clubs including Bohemian and Kilkenny City.

Tierney moved in the early 1990s to Asia, signing for PDRM FC in the Malaysian Liga Perdana and then moving onto Penang F.C. also in the Liga Perdana.

In 1996 Tierney then moved to play in the North American Professional Leagues starting with Houston Hotshots of the Continental Indoor Soccer League (CISL). Houston Hotshots who made the North American National final that year for the first time in club history. In 1997 he then moved back to Asia to play with Singapore champions Geylang International FC and enjoyed being one of the first Scottish players to play in the Asian Club Championship (AFC Champions League) and also reaching the Singapore FA Cup Final where Tierney won man of the match honours and was also nominated for the S.League player of the year in 1997.

In 1998 he moved back to play in USA professional A-League for Connecticut Wolves (American 1st Division before MLS).

For 1999 and 2000 Tierney played both indoor and outdoor soccer for Tulsa Roughnecks known as Tulsa Roughnecks, despite offers from England, but retired in 2000 due to injury.

== Coaching career ==
Between 1999 and 2004 Tierney was the Director of Coaching for Tulsa Thunder S.C. Including where he coached one his club teams who for the first time in club history qualified for the U.S. Youth Soccer National Championships under 18s finals held at the Disney ESPN Wide World of Sports Complex in Florida and major tournament including the Dallas Cup.

Also while coaching in the United States he was offered the opportunity to work with elite youth players and also elite college players from the likes of University of Tulsa, Oklahoma State University, Harvard University and Trinity College.

For part of the 1999 Tulsa Roughnecks season Tierney was appointed player-coach.

Also in 2000 to present day he became Head Coach and Director of coaching of Soccer Experience international teams for soccer camps, clinics and overseas events including elite soccer events in USA, Asia, Spain and the UK coaching against world class teams including Atlético Madrid, Glasgow Rangers, Glasgow Celtic, Sunderland and more.

In 2014 he was appointed Head Coach and Director of coaching for Soccer Experience FC in Spain where some of the teams won Spanish leagues and cup competitions and also played against world class teams including Spanish giants Atlético Madrid, and regular Peruvian champions and Copa Americas team Sporting Cristal.

From 2017 onwards, Martin involve in coaching and helping Scottish Premier League Academy Team including St. Johnstone vs Celtic FC Academy.

In 2018 and 2019 he was player-coach of Nottingham Forest at the Hong Kong FC international soccer 7s where the team reached the main final for the first time.

In 2019 Tierney was appointed Head coach of the USA veterans team at the Senior World Cup held in Thailand.

Also In 2019 he was Head coach of Soccer Experience FC who went undefeated in open play at the JSSL international youth elite tournament in Singapore coaching against some of Asia biggest clubs.

Martin have coaching licenses from all over the world including UEFA, AFC and USSF.

== Broadcasting career ==
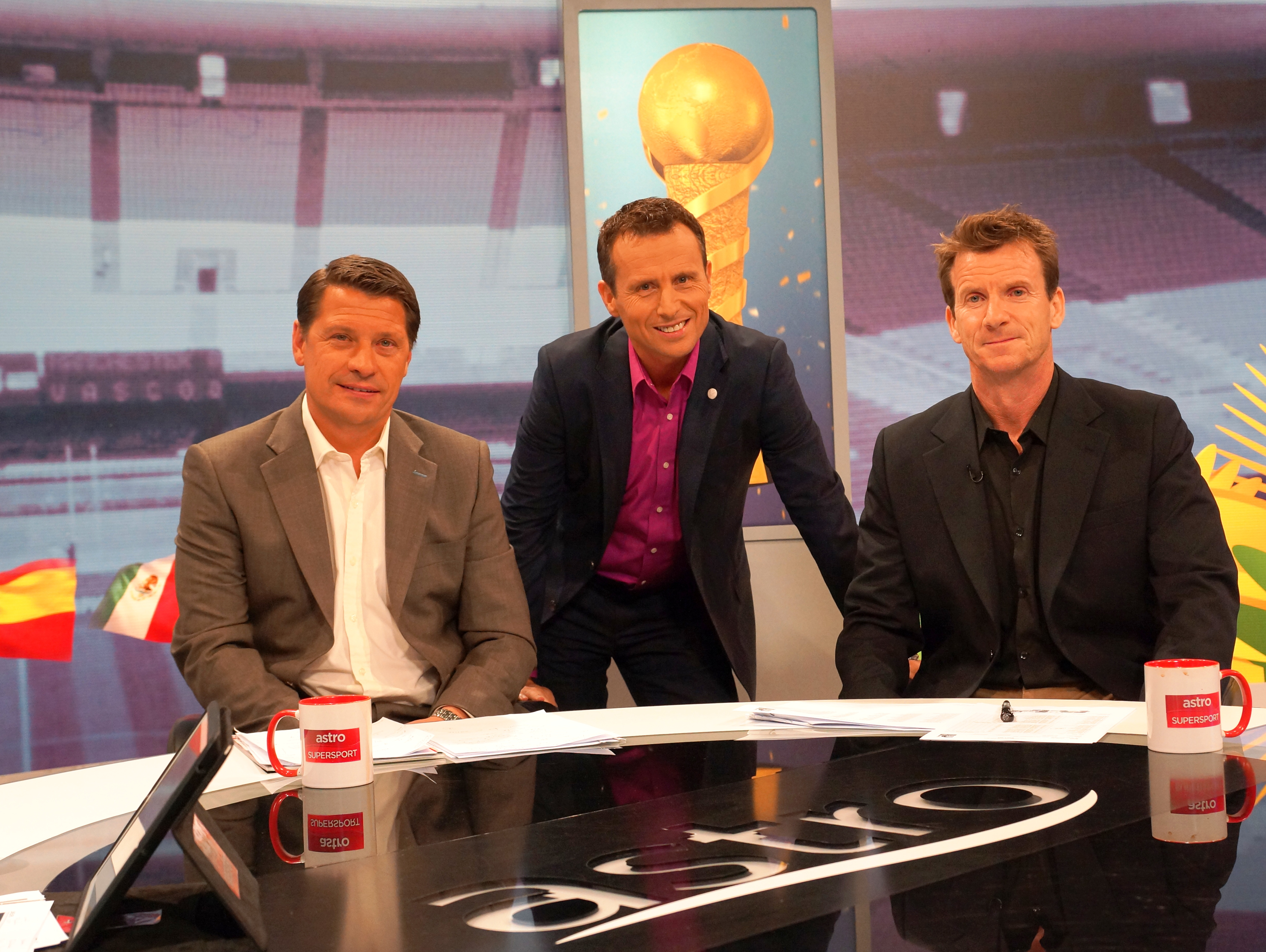

In 2009, Tierney began appearing as a football expert in the studios of Malaysian network Astro. with coverage of the UEFA Champions League, La Liga and a regular studio guest for the English Premier League coverage and the FourFourTwo TV Show with the SuperSport channels, Also Tierney as a football expert worked with other ex footballer guest pundits like Tony Cottee, Ian Walker, Lee Sharpe with Malaysian network Astro, hosted by Jason Dasey who is a TV and radio broadcaster.

Tierney covered major tournaments, including 2010 FIFA World Cup, UEFA Euro 2012 and 2013 FIFA Confederations Cup.

== Post-retirement career ==
Tierney has started his own company, Soccer Experience which provides soccer and coaching services. While in the USA he was offered the opportunity to become a director of coaching who worked with elite youth players and also elite college players from the likes of University of Tulsa, Oklahoma State University, Harvard University and Trinity College. He is also a pundit on the Astro Supersport coverage of the English Premier League.

== Personal life ==
Martin's son Fergus Tierney is also a professional footballer, who plays for the Malaysia national team.
