= US Possession =

- Full name: Union Sportive de La Possession
- Nickname(s): Diables rouges
- Dissolved: 2008
- Ground: Stade Youri-Gagarine; La Possession, Réunion Island
- Capacity: 1,000
- Chairman: Luçet Gay
- Manager: Seck Boubaca
- League: Réunion Premier League
- 2007: 14 (withdrew)
Home colours

Union Sportive de La Possession, was a football club from La Possession, Réunion Island, which merged 2008 with AJS Possession to form AS Possession.

== The club in the French football structure ==
- French Cup : 1 appearance

1993/94

won tie: 1993/94 US Possession 2–1 SCO Roubaix [aet] (rd 7)
