= Syed Faruk Alkaff =

Singaporean footballer

Syed Faruk bin Syed Salim Alkaff (born 11 February 1967, in Singapore) was a Singapore national team player from 1988 to 1994. Syed Faruk is currently the managing director of Premier Pitch a company that he founded which manages multiple football playing locations in Singapore. Faruk studied at Anglo-Chinese School on Barker Road, Singapore.

Syed Faruk married Australian Felicia Ayling. They have a son born in 1994 and a daughter born in 1998.
