= Shahri Rahim =

Singaporean footballer

Personal information
- Place of birth: Singapore
- Position: Goalkeeper

Senior career*
Years	Team	Apps	(Gls)
- Warriors FC
- Tampines Rovers FC
- Balestier Khalsa FC

International career
- Singapore
- * Club domestic league appearances and goals

Shahri Rahim (born in Singapore) is a former Singaporean footballer and president of National Football League second division club South Avenue.
