= Michael Currie (footballer) =

English footballer

Personal information
- Date of birth: 19 October 1979 (age 46)
- Place of birth: England
- Positions: Midfielder; winger; striker

Senior career*
| Years | Team | Apps | (Gls) |
| –2001 | Queen's Park Rangers | 0 | (0) |
| 1999 | → Hougang United FC (loan) | | |
| 2001–2002 | Hayes | 16 | (0) |
| 2002 | Northwood | 1 | (0) |
- Maidenhead United
- Hampton & Richmond Borough
- Staines Town
- Wealdstone
- Beaconsfield Town
- * Club domestic league appearances and goals

Michael Currie (born 19 October 1979) is an English retired footballer.

== Career ==
Known for his pace and able to run 100m in less than 11 seconds at Queen's Park Rangers, Currie was loaned out to Singaporean S.League side Hougang United in 1999, where he scored a David Beckham style free kick live on tv, was MOM in the All Stars v Singapore international team creating 5 assists and was compared to England international Steve McManaman. However, despite his successful spell in Singapore, Currie sustained a shattered metatarsal upon return to Queen's Park Rangers before being released in 2001. After that, he played for the England beach football team in Marseille against Eric Cantonas French team, scoring 4 goals and went on to play for a series of English non-league outfits.
