= Mohammad Reza Zadmehr =

Iranian footballer

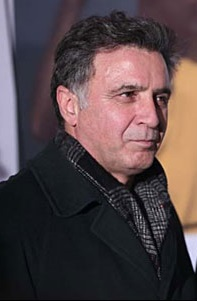

Personal information
- Full name: Mohammad Reza Zadmehr
- Date of birth: August 16, 1956 (age 70)
- Place of birth: Tehran, Iran

Team information
- Current team: Persepolis (Director of football)

Youth career
- 1975–1979: Persepolis

Senior career*
Years	Team	Apps	(Gls)
1979–1983	Persepolis		

International career
1982–1989	Iran		
- * Club domestic league appearances and goals

Mohammad Reza Zadmehr (Persian: محمدرضا زادمهر, born August 16, 1956, in Tehran, Iran) is a retired Iranian football player. He played all of his football career at Persepolis and was the club's team manager from 2012 to 2013. He is currently a board member of Persepolis.

== Honors ==
Persepolis

- Iranian Football League (and Tehran Provincial League):
  - Winners (6): 1975–76, 1982–83, 1986–87, 1987–88, 1988–89, 1989–90
- Hazfi Cup:
  - Winners (4): 1981–82, 1984–85, 1986–87, 1987–88
- Tehran Super Cup:
  - Winners (1): 1992

== Other titles ==
- Team Manager of Iran National Football Teams (Junior, Youth, and Senior Levels)
- Member of the Board of Directors, Persepolis Football Club
- Player of the Iran National Football Team – Champion of the Asian Games in Thailand – 1975
- Champion of Shiraz International Football Tournament as the player – 1975
- Champion of Iran National Football Technical Skills Championship – 1974
- Player of Persepolis Club – Iranian Premier League Champion – 1975, 1976, 1977
- Iranian Premier League Runner-up – 1978
- FA Cup Champion of Iran – 1978
- Team Manager of Persepolis Football Club
- Former Player of Junior and Senior Teams of Persepolis FC
- Honorary Member of the National Olympic Committee – Asian Games Seoul 1986 & Barcelona Olympics Games 1992
