= 1993 Liga Semi-Pro Divisyen 2 =

- Season: 1993
- Champions: Selangor; 1st Second Division title
- Matches: 112

The 1993 Liga Semi-Pro Divisyen 2 season is the last season of Liga Semi-Pro Divisyen 2. A total of eight teams participated in the season.

Sabah, Singapura and Selangor were relegated from 1992 Liga Semi-Pro Divisyen 1.

Under the new format, only the top six teams in Divisyen 1 and the Divisyen 2 champions and runners-up will be involved in the Malaysia Cup. Malaysia Cup was played from the quarter-final stage, scheduled for November after the league was finished. The Malaysia Cup quarter-final and semi-final matches will be played on a home and away basis.

The season kicked off on 10 May 1993. Selangor ended up the season by winning the title.

After the end of the season, both division of Malaysian Semi-Pro Football League were merged to create the Malaysian first professional football league, the Malaysia Premier League starting from 1994 season.

== Teams ==
Eight teams competing in the last season of Liga Semi-Pro Divisyen 2.All teams except PDRM and ATM were promoted to 1994 Liga Perdana.

- Selangor (1989 Liga Semi-Pro Divisyen 2 champions)
- (Singapore) Singapura
- Sabah
- Brunei
- (Malacca) Melaka
- (Malaysia) PDRM
- Perlis
- (Malaysia) ATM

== Champions ==
1993 Liga Semi-Pro Divisyen 2 champion

1st title
