= Milomir Šešlija =

Bosnian football manager and former player

Personal information
- Full name: Milomir Šešlija
- Date of birth: 21 July 1964 (age 62)
- Place of birth: Sarajevo, SR Bosnia and Herzegovina, Yugoslavia
- Height: 1.90 m (6 ft 3 in)
- Position: Defender

Senior career*
Years	Team	Apps	(Gls)
1985–1986	Željezničar	7	(0)
1987–1988	Novi Sad		
1988–1990	Famos Hrasnica		
1990–1991	AIK Bačka Topola		
1991–1992	Sloboda Užice		
1992–1993	Kuala Lumpur		
1993–1997	Sabah		
1997–2000	Sembawang Rangers		

Managerial career
- 2001–2002: Solunac Rastina
- 2002–2003: Slavija Sarajevo
- 2004–2005: SAŠK Napredak
- 2005–2007: Velež Mostar
- 2007–2008: Dhofar
- 2008–2009: Seeb
- 2009–2010: Rudar Kakanj
- 2011–2012: Arema Indonesia (ISL)
- 2013: Slavija Sarajevo
- 2013–2014: Sabah
- 2016–2017: Arema
- 2017: Persiba Balikpapan
- 2018: Madura United
- 2019: Arema
- 2020–2021: Igman Konjic
- 2021: PSM Makassar
- 2022: Borneo
- 2023: Famos Vojkovići
- 2023–2024: Maziya
- 2024: Persis Solo
- 2025: Famos Vojkovići
- 2025–2026: Persis Solo
- * Club domestic league appearances and goals

Milomir Šešlija, also known as Milo (born 21 July 1964) is a Bosnian professional football manager and former player who was most recently the head coach of Persis Solo.

== Playing career ==
Šešlija began playing football for Yugoslav First League side Željezničar. After spending most of his career playing in the former Yugoslavia, he moved to Malaysia, where he would play for Kuala Lumpur and Sabah and in Singapore for Sembawang Rangers.

== Managerial career ==
After Šešlija retired from playing football, he became a manager. In 2006, he won the First League of FBiH with Velež Mostar and got the club promoted to the Bosnian Premier League. In July 2013, he was named as the new manager of Sabah.

Šešlija was a runner-up in the 2016 Indonesia Soccer Championship A with Arema, and in 2019 won the Indonesia President's Cup with the club.

On 23 September 2020, he returned to Bosnia, becoming manager of First League of FBiH club Igman Konjic.

On 7 April 2022, he signed contract for Borneo.

== Managerial statistics ==
As of match played 23 May 2026

Managerial record by team and tenure
Team	Nat.	From	To	Record					Ref.
Team	Nat.	From	To	G	W	D	L	Win %	Ref.
Velež Mostar	(Bosnia and Herzegovina)	1 July 2006	30 June 2007	30	12	7	11	40.00	
Slavija Sarajevo	(Bosnia and Herzegovina)	5 January 2013	6 July 2013	15	5	2	8	33.33	
Arema	(Indonesia)	1 February 2016	1 January 2017	49	29	13	7	59.18	
Persiba Balikpapan	(Indonesia)	4 May 2017	9 August 2017	15	2	4	9	13.33	
Madura United	(Indonesia)	1 March 2018	31 May 2018	11	5	2	4	45.45	
Arema	(Indonesia)	9 January 2019	31 December 2019	44	19	10	15	43.18	
Igman Konjic	(Bosnia and Herzegovina)	22 September 2020	6 April 2021	14	4	2	8	28.57	
PSM Makassar	(Indonesia)	8 July 2021	25 November 2021	14	4	6	4	28.57	
Borneo	(Indonesia)	1 May 2022	25 September 2022	19	12	4	3	63.16	
Famos Vojkovići	(Bosnia and Herzegovina)	24 April 2023	12 June 2023	8	4	1	3	50.00	
Maziya	(Maldives)	6 July 2023	31 December 2023	17	12	1	4	70.59	
Persis Solo	(Indonesia)	9 January 2024	25 September 2024	23	11	2	10	47.83	
Famos Vojkovići	(Bosnia and Herzegovina)	6 September 2025	30 November 2025	11	3	4	4	27.27	
Persis Solo	(Indonesia)	16 December 2025	Present	21	7	6	8	33.33	
Career Total				291	129	64	98	44.33	

== Honours ==
=== Player ===
Sabah

- Liga Perdana: 1996
- Malaysia FA Cup: 1995

=== Manager ===
Velež Mostar

- First League of FBiH: 2005–06

Arema

- Indonesia President's Cup: 2019
