= Woodlands Wellington FC =

Singaporean football club

Woodlands Wellington
- Full name: Woodlands Wellington Football Club
- Nickname: The Northern Rams
- Founded: 1988; 38 years ago as Wellington; 1996; 30 years ago as Woodlands Wellington
- Dissolved: 2014; 12 years ago
- Ground: Woodlands Stadium
- Capacity: 4,300
- League: S.League
- 2014: S.League, 11th of 12
| Home colours | Away colours |

Woodlands Wellington Football Club was a professional football club based in Woodlands, Singapore which played in the S.League, the top division of football in Singapore. The club took part in S.League from 1996 to 2014. They were at the 4,300 seater Woodlands Stadium, where they ha played since their establishment.

Woodlands Wellington's honours include winning the inaugural Singapore League Cup in 2007, defeating Sengkang Punggol 4–0 in the final. They also finished runners-up in the Singapore FA Cup in 1997, and also in the Singapore Cup in 2005. In 1998 they won the President's Centennial Cup, defeating Hong Kong Rangers 2–1 in the final in Bacolod.

Their best finish in the S-League came in the 1996 Tiger Beer Series where they were runners-up. They also achieved 3rd place in 1997 and 2005.

== History ==
=== Wellington Football Club (1988–1996) ===
Woodlands Wellington was founded as Wellington Football Club in 1988 as a splinter group of Delhi Juniors (a team of Singaporean football enthusiasts, dating back to the 1940s, that were among the pioneers of football in Singapore). The name stems from the Deptford Ground located on Wellington Road in Sembawang where the team started playing football in 1988.

In 1991, they participated in the Sembawang Group League and Island-Wide League, winning as champions in both competitions and setting a national record by beating Seletar Football Club by a 27-goal margin. This was one of the biggest wins the club had ever achieved, as they beat their opponents 28 – 1 at the Woodlands Stadium on 17 November 1991. Louis Amalorpavanathan scored a record 12 goals in that match.

The following year, Wellington FC joined the Singapore National Football League in Division 2, from which they were promoted as champions in 1994. The following season they finished first in Division 1 (going unbeaten for 24 matches) and were runners-up in the FA Cup.

=== Woodlands Wellington Football Club (1996–2014) ===
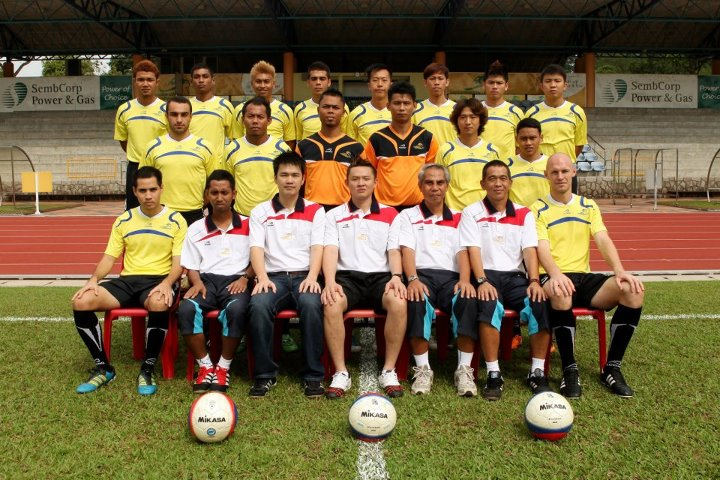
Woodlands Wellington 2012 First Team group photo

Wellington Football Club were selected as one of eight clubs to compete in the newly formed S.League in its inaugural season in 1996, prompting the club to adopt Woodlands Stadium as their home ground and to change their name to Woodlands Wellington Football Club.

Following their admission to the S.League, Wellington's founder, R. Vengadasalam, was appointed as the Team Manager of Woodlands Wellington and Bandai were announced as a sponsor in their maiden season in the S.League. Following this, they signed Jan Janostak, Joe Caleta and Ervin Boban, from the Malaysia Super League, as well as Singapore national players Borhan Abu Samah, Tamil Marren, Zakaria Awang, from England Notts County legend Darren Davis and Croatian goalkeeper Sandro Radun, who played for the Singapore FA in 1992. Woodlands Wellington played to capacity crowds, including their pre-season friendlies.

Woodlands won the President's Centennial Cup in 1998, a cup competition organized by the Philippine Football Federation to celebrate the centennial of Philippine Independence, beating Sembawang Rangers 4–2 in the semi-final and Hong Kong Rangers 2–1 at the Negros Occidental Sports Complex in the final in Bacolod with both goals from Razali Ahmad.

While they enjoyed a relatively successful period throughout the late nineties, Woodlands finished last in the 2001 S.League season, prompting them to sign Singapore internationals Zulkarnaen Zainal, Goh Tat Chuan and A. Siva Kumar. The transfers of Goh and Siva Kumar were particularly controversial as Woodlands and Jurong were well-known rivals in the league.

Woodlands Wellington made the headlines in the 2007 S.League season for a walkout by the entire Woodlands squad in a match against Tampines Rovers as a protest to the decisions made against them by referee P. Pandian. Woodlands were fined $30,000 for the incident and had six points docked. Tampines coach Vorawan Chitavanich was reported as saying "I spoke to their coach just a little while ago and he said that they acted on the instructions of their club chairman."

==== Reported withdrawal from the S. League ====
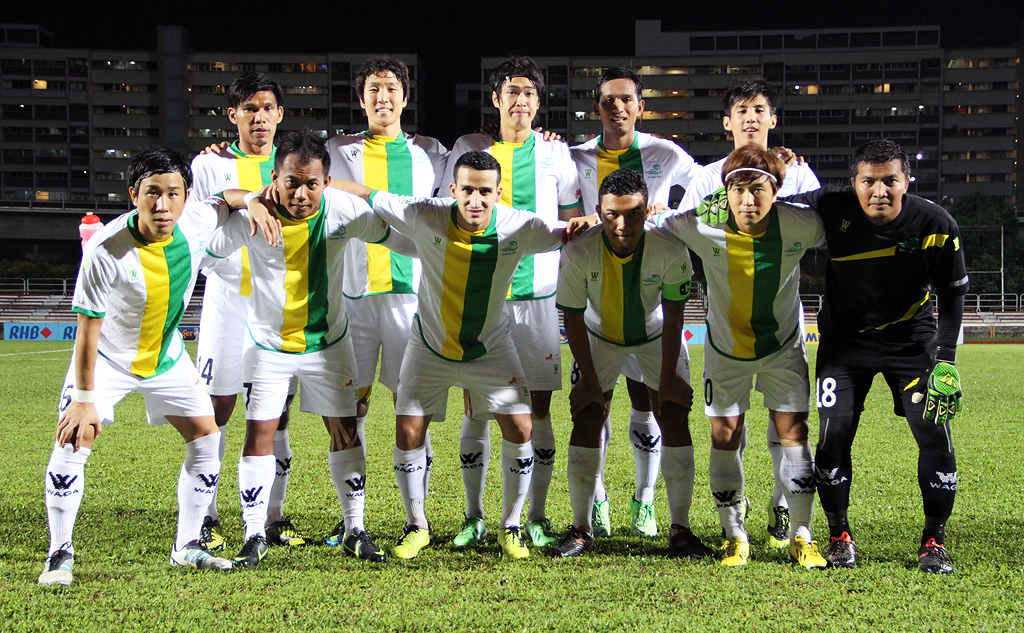
The starting eleven for Woodlands Wellington on 2 May 2013 against Balestier Khalsa in the 2013 S.League.

A report by The New Paper on 22 November 2012 suggested that Woodlands may be in financial trouble and could be the second club to sit out the 2013 S.League after Gombak United has announced earlier that it would not be taking part in the league in 2013. This sparked off a supporter-driven "Save Woodlands" awareness campaign on the same day. The club held an open meeting with the supporters and press at Woodlands Stadium later that evening and quashed the report. Team manager, Matthew Tay, also said that the club was already preparing a pre-season tour of Malaysia, and that the club would be signing players and would also be aiming for a minimum 8th spot in the table this season.

==== Merger with Hougang United ====
In November 2014, it was announced that Woodlands Wellington and Hougang United would merge for the 2015 season. However, the move did not materialise.

In 2016, Woodlands formed teams to play in the Island Wide League (IWL) and Women's Premier League (WPL). After two years, they restarted their football operations, at least at the youth and grassroots level, as they began to work their way back into the S.League.

In 2017, Woodlands Wellington reportedly pulled out of IWL after one season.

== Supporters ==
The supporters' club of Woodlands Wellington Football Club were known as The Black Sheep. They were seen at both home and away games dressed in the club's official colours of yellow and blue and are usually seated behind the Rams' dugout. Since its inception, The Black Sheep have been using the war cry "Never Surrender!" to rally their players on.

== Stadium ==
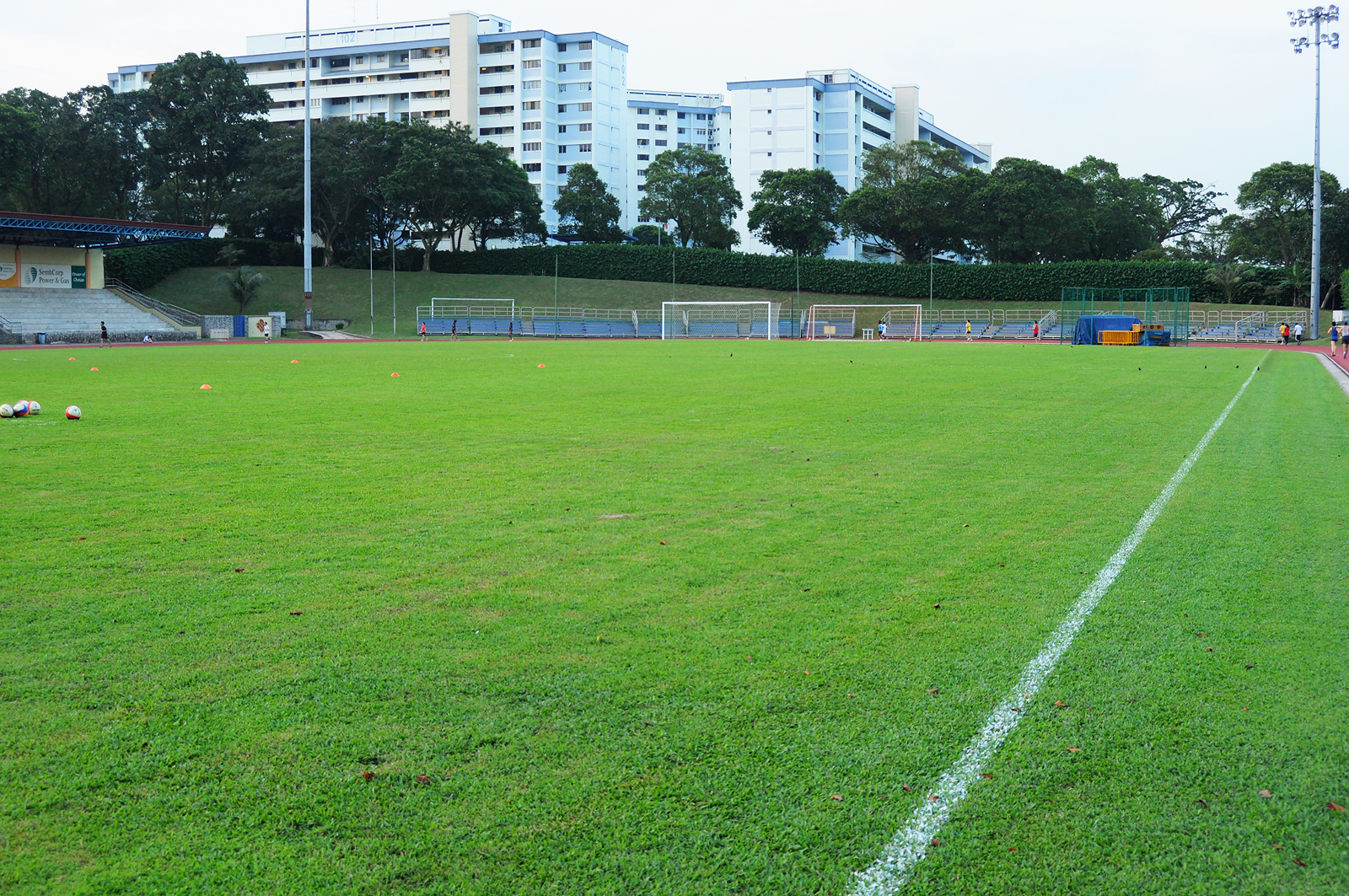
Woodlands Stadium's grass pitch

Woodlands Stadium was the home ground of Woodlands Wellington, and used mostly for football matches. Apart from being used for competitive matches, the pitch was also utilised by the club for their training sessions. The stadium capacity was upgraded to 4,300. This includes the 2,000 seater grandstand, the 1,000 seater semi-permanent stand opposite the grandstand and the 1,300 seater portable stands on each end of the pitch.

Woodlands Stadium is the only stadium in Singapore which has a MRT track overlooking the pitch.

== Sponsors ==
Woodlands Wellington was sponsored by Bandai from 1996 to 1998, and Sembcorp from 2001 to 2010. The club went without a sponsor from 2011 to 2012, before Singaporean equity company ESW took up the sponsorship from March 2013. They were outfitted by Singaporean brand Waga for their 2013 season. Their previous kit sponsors include Lotto, Kappa, Diadora, Umbro, Mitre and Thai apparel Acono.

| Year | Kit manufacturer | Main sponsors |
|---|---|---|
| 1996–1998 | (Italy) Lotto | (Japan) Bandai |
| 1999–2000 | (Italy) Lotto | No sponsor |
| 2001–2004 | (Italy) Lotto | (Singapore) Sembcorp |
| 2005 | (Italy) Kappa | (Singapore) Sembcorp |
| 2006–2008 | (Italy) Diadora | (Singapore) Sembcorp |
| 2009–2010 | (England) Umbro | (Singapore) Sembcorp |
| 2011 | (England) Mitre | No sponsor |
| 2012 | (Thailand) Acono | No sponsor |
| 2013–2014 | (Singapore) Waga | (Singapore) ESW |

== Logo and mascot ==
Woodlands Wellington FC crest, 1996–2002

Woodlands Wellington's crest, 2003–2014

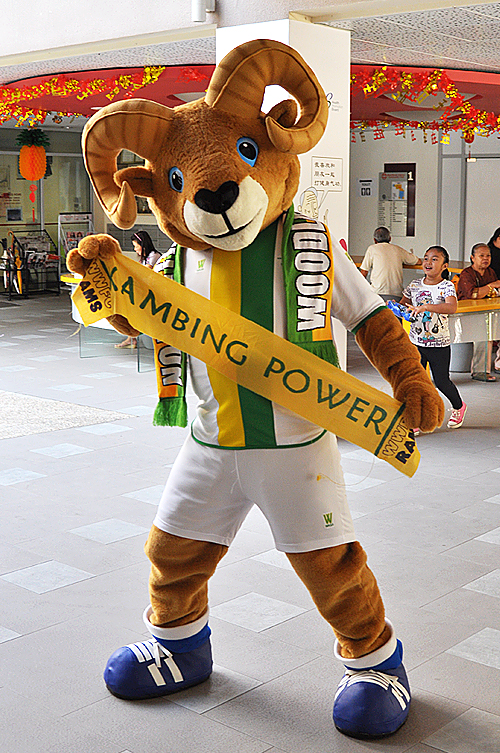
Woodlands Wellington's Ram Mascot

== Colours ==
As Wellington Football Club, the team played in a white kit with purple and green trimmings. As soon as they were rebranded into the Woodlands Wellington Football Club in 1996, the Rams changed their home kit to all white with a narrow stripe of yellow and green down the middle. In the ensuing years, yellow was employed as the main colour of choice for the home kit and had become the traditional colour for the club.

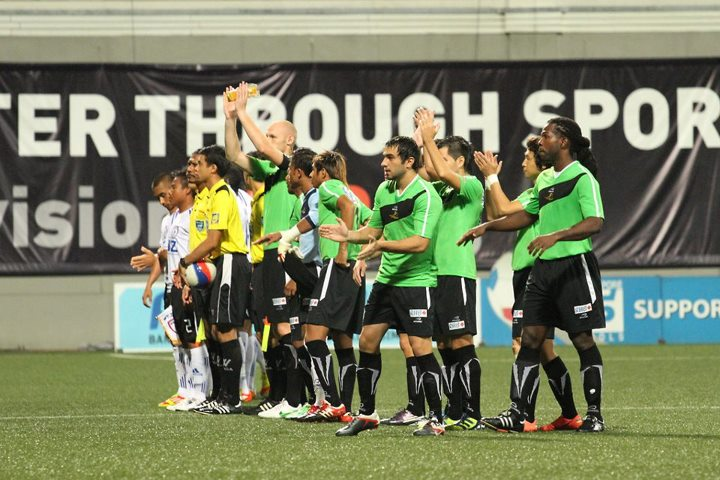
The Woodlands Wellington team in their green third kit against Myanmar club, Kanbawza in the 2012 Singapore Cup on19 May 2012

== Continental record ==
| Season | Competition | Round | Club | Home | Away | Position |
|---|---|---|---|---|---|---|
| 1992–93 | Asian Cup Winners' Cup | First round | (Thailand) Sinthana | 1–1 | 4–1 | 2–5 |

== Coaching history ==
- (England) Steve Wicks (1996)
- (England) Dean Wheatley (1997–98)
- (Singapore) V. Sivalingam (1999)
- (Croatia) Ivan Raznevich (2000–01)
- (Malaysia) M. Karathu (2002–03)
- (England) Simon Clark (2003–04) – player / coach
- (England) Maff Brown (2005)
- (Morocco) Karim Bencherifa (1 January 2005 – 30 June 2006)
- (Germany) Jörg Steinebrunner (2006–08)
- (Croatia) Nenad Bacina (1 January – 31 December 2009)
- (Singapore) A. Shasi Kumar (1 January – 31 December 2010)
- (Singapore) R. Balasubramaniam (1 January 2011 – 12 January 2012)
- (Singapore) Salim Moin (13 January 2012 – 28 November 2013)
- (Australia) Darren Stewart (14 January – 15 June 2014)
- (Singapore) Salim Moin (15 June 2014 – 31 December 2015)

== Performance in domestic competitions ==
| Season | S.League | | | | | | | | Singapore Cup | Singapore League Cup |
| Season | Pos | P | W | D | L | F | A | Pts | Singapore Cup | Singapore League Cup |
|---|---|---|---|---|---|---|---|---|---|---|
| 1996-1 | 2nd* | 14 | 8 | 2 | 4 | 25 | 20 | 26 | | |
| 1996-2 | 4th | 14 | 6 | 3 | 5 | 29 | 25 | 21 | | |
| 1997 | 3rd | 16 | 11 | 0 | 5 | 35 | 29 | 33 | | |
| 1998 | 9th | 20 | 4 | 6 | 10 | 27 | 41 | 18 | Group stage | |
| 1999 | 9th | 22 | 6 | 4 | 12 | 30 | 44 | 22 | Quarter-finals | |
| 2000 | 10th | 22 | 4 | 5 | 13 | 19 | 31 | 17 | Semi-finals | |
| 2001 | 12th | 33 | 5 | 9 | 19 | 40 | 64 | 24 | Group stage | |
| 2002 | 5th | 33 | 17 | 7 | 9 | 75 | 44 | 58 | Group stage | |
| 2003 | 5th | 33 | 14 | 4–8 | 7 | 65 | 47 | 58 | Semi-finals | |
| 2004 | 6th | 27 | 12 | 4 | 11 | 48 | 49 | 40 | Preliminary | |
| 2005 | 3rd | 27 | 15 | 5 | 7 | 57 | 44 | 50 | Runners-up | |
| 2006 | 5th | 30 | 13 | 8 | 9 | 60 | 45 | 47 | Third place | |
| 2007 | 7th | 33 | 10 | 13 | 10 | 47 | 52 | 37* | Semi-finals | Winners |
| 2008 | 8th | 33 | 9 | 8 | 16 | 36 | 52 | 35 | Runners-up | Preliminary |
| 2009 | 15 | 23 | 48 | 31 | Round of 16 | Semi-finals | | | | |
| 2010 | 12th | 33 | 4 | 7 | 22 | 18 | 60 | 19 | Round of 16 | Runners-up |
| 2011 | 12th | 33 | 3 | 4 | 26 | 22 | 92 | 13 | Round of 16 | Preliminary |
| 2012 | 13th | 24 | 3 | 5 | 16 | 19 | 44 | 14 | Round of 16 | Group stage |
| 2013 | 5th | 27 | 10 | 7 | 10 | 45 | 47 | 37 | Round of 16 | Semi-finals |
| 2014 | 11th | 27 | 5 | 8 | 14 | 22 | 52 | 23 | Preliminary | Quarter-finals |

- The 1996 season of the S.League was split into two series. Tiger Beer Series winners Geylang United defeated Pioneer Series winners Singapore Armed Forces in the Championship playoff to clinch the S.League title.
- 2003 saw the introduction of penalty shoot-outs if a match ended in a draw in regular time. Winners of penalty shoot-outs gained two points instead of one.
- Woodlands Wellington deducted 6 points for abandoning a match on 5 September 2007.

Last updated on 15 May 2014

== Records and statistics ==
Top 10 all-time appearances
| Rank | Player | Years | Club appearances |
|---|---|---|---|
| 1 | (Singapore) Yazid Yasin | 2004–2008, 2013–2014 | 163 |
| 2 | (Singapore) Sazali Salleh | 2005–2008, 2010–2011 | 158 |
| 3 | (Singapore) Goh Tat Chuan | 2002–2006 | 138 |
| 4 | (Morocco) Abdelhadi Laakkad | 2005–2010 | 129 |
| 5 | (South Korea) Moon Soon-ho | 2011–2014 | 108 |
| 6 | (Singapore) Goh Swee Swee | 2011–2014 | 105 |
| 7 | (Singapore) Azlan Alipah | 2006–2011 | 89 |
| 8 | (Singapore) Agu Casmir | 2002–2003, 2006 | 83 |
| 9 | (Singapore) Anaz Hadee | 2008–2010 | 69 |
| 10 | (Singapore) Armanizam Dolah | 2012–2014 | 67 |

=== Top 10 all-time scorers ===
Top 10 all-time scorers
| Rank | Player | Club appearances | Total goals |
|---|---|---|---|
| 1 | (Singapore) Agu Casmir | 83 | 55 |
| 2 | (South Korea) Moon Soon-ho | 108 | 38 |
| 3 | (Morocco) Abdelhadi Laakkad | 129 | 36 |
| 4 | (South Korea) Jang Jo-yoon | 64 | 25 |
| 5 | (Singapore) Agu Casmir | 34 | 17 |
| 6 | (Singapore) Goh Swee Swee | 105 | 10 |
| 7 | (England) Daniel Hammond | 57 | 9 |
| 7 | (South Korea) Park Tae-won | 41 | 9 |
| 9 | (Romania) Lucian Dronca | 41 | 6 |
| 9 | (Cameroon) Essa Mvondo | 28 | 6 |

== Honours ==
| Type | Competition | Titles | Seasons |
|---|---|---|---|
| Cup | Singapore League Cup | 1 | 2007 |

== Personal awards ==
=== Domestic ===
- League Player of the Year
  - (Morocco) Laakkad Abdelhadi (2006)
  - (Singapore) Aleksandar Duric
- League Coach of the Year
  - (Malaysia) M. Karathu (2002)
- League Top Scorer
  - (Morocco) Laakkad Abdelhadi (2006)
  - (South Korea) Moon Soon-Ho (2013)
- Player of the century
  - (Singapore) Staffan Stewart (2025)
