= Chris Riley (New Zealand footballer) =

English-born New Zealand footballer (born 1964)

Personal information
- Full name: Chris A Riley
- Date of birth: 19 August 1964 (age 62)
- Place of birth: England
- Position: Midfielder

Senior career*
Years	Team	Apps	(Gls)
- North Shore United
- Miramar Rangers

International career
1988–93	New Zealand	16	(0)
- * Club domestic league appearances and goals

Chris Riley (born 19 August 1964) is a New Zealand footballer who represented New Zealand.

Riley made his full All Whites debut in a 1-2 loss to Australia on 12 October 1988 and ended his international playing career with 16 A-international caps to his credit, his final cap being in a 0-3 loss to Australia on 6 June 1993.
