= Nathaniel Klay Naplah =

Liberian footballer

Nathaniel Naplah
Personal information
- Full name: Nathaniel Klay Naplah
- Date of birth: 5 December 1974 (age 51)
- Place of birth: Liberia
- Height: 1.84 m (6 ft 0 in)
- Position: Defender

Senior career*
Years	Team	Apps	(Gls)
–1996	Negeri Sembilan		
1996-1998	Balestier Central		
1999	Tampines Rovers		
1999–2000	1. SC Norderstedt		
2003–2006	Tampines Rovers		

International career
1999	Liberia	1	(0)
- * Club domestic league appearances and goals

Nathaniel Klay Naplah (born 5 December 1974 in Liberia) is a Liberian football coach and former footballer.

== Early life ==
Due to the recrudescence of civil war in Liberia in the 1990s, Naplah eventually moved to Ghana, his father's homeland.

== Career ==
Agreeing a free contract with German lower-league side 1. SC Norderstedt in September 1999, Naplah previously played for Tampines Rovers and Balestier Central in Singapore, leaving the former in June 1999. Besides playing his trade in Singapore and Germany, he has also played abroad in Malaysia, for Negeri Sembilan FA. Taking up a youth coaching position at the International Soccer Academy in Singapore, the former Liberian international has led some of their teams to the Gothia Cup, a global tournament for youth sides.

He has called on the Singapore national team to play friendlies against better opposition.
