= AS Possession =

- Full name: Association Sportive de La Possession
- Nickname: Diables rouges
- Founded: 2008
- Ground: Stade Youri-Gagarine; La Possession, Réunion Island
- Capacity: 700
- Chairman: Luçet Gay
- Manager: Jean-Max Tréport
- League: Réunion Premier League
- 2014: 1st
Home colours

Association Sportive de La Possession is a football club from La Possession, Réunion Island.

== History ==
The club was the fusion of AJS Possession and US Possession. The club won its first Super Division 2 title in 2010.

=== Titles ===
Champion de Division 2R

- 2010, 2014
