= Jan Janošťák =

Czech soccer player (born 1965)

Personal information
- Date of birth: 22 March 1965 (age 61)
- Place of birth: Žulová, Czechoslovakia
- Position: Striker

Senior career*
Years	Team	Apps	(Gls)
1984–1985	Třinec		
1985–1987	VTJ Tábor		
1987–1992	Sigma Olomouc		
1991	→ Drnovice (loan)		
1992	→ Zlín (loan)		
1992–1993	Zbrojovka Brno		
1994–1996	Kedah		
1996–1997	Woodlands Wellington		
- * Club domestic league appearances and goals

Jan Janošťák (born 22 March 1965) is a Czech former footballer who last played as a striker for Woodlands Wellington.

== Life ==
Janošťák was born in 1965 in Žulová, Czechoslovakia.

Janošťák has been married and has a daughter and son.

== Career ==
In 1996, Janošťák signed for Singaporean side Woodlands Wellington, where he gained the nickname "Terminator". He was regarded as one of the club's main attacking points. Previously, he played for Malaysian side Kedah. After signing for Kedah, he was expected to be one of the club's most important players.

== Style of play ==
Janošťák mainly operated as a striker and was known for his speed and power. He was also known for his crossing ability and dribbling ability.
