= Sembawang Rangers FC =

Singaporean football club

Sembawang Rangers
- Full name: Sembawang Rangers Football Club
- Nickname: The Stallions
- Founded: 1996
- Dissolved: 2003
- Ground: Yishun Stadium
- Capacity: 3,400
- League: S.League
- 2003: S.League, 9th of 12
Home colours	Away colours

Sembawang Rangers Football Club was a professional football club based in Sembawang, Singapore. The club played in the S.League, the top division of football in Singapore. The club was formed as merger between two NFL sides, Gibraltar Crescent and Sembawang Sports Club, to enter the inaugural S.League.

They were known as The Stallions as the founder of the club was born in the Horse. Following a league revamp, the club was removed from the S.League at the end of the 2003 season. In the eight seasons of participation, Sembawang Rangers played a total of 207 league matches, with a record of 53 wins, 47 draws & 102 losses. A total of 256 goals were scored while conceding 402 goals in the process.

== Stadium ==
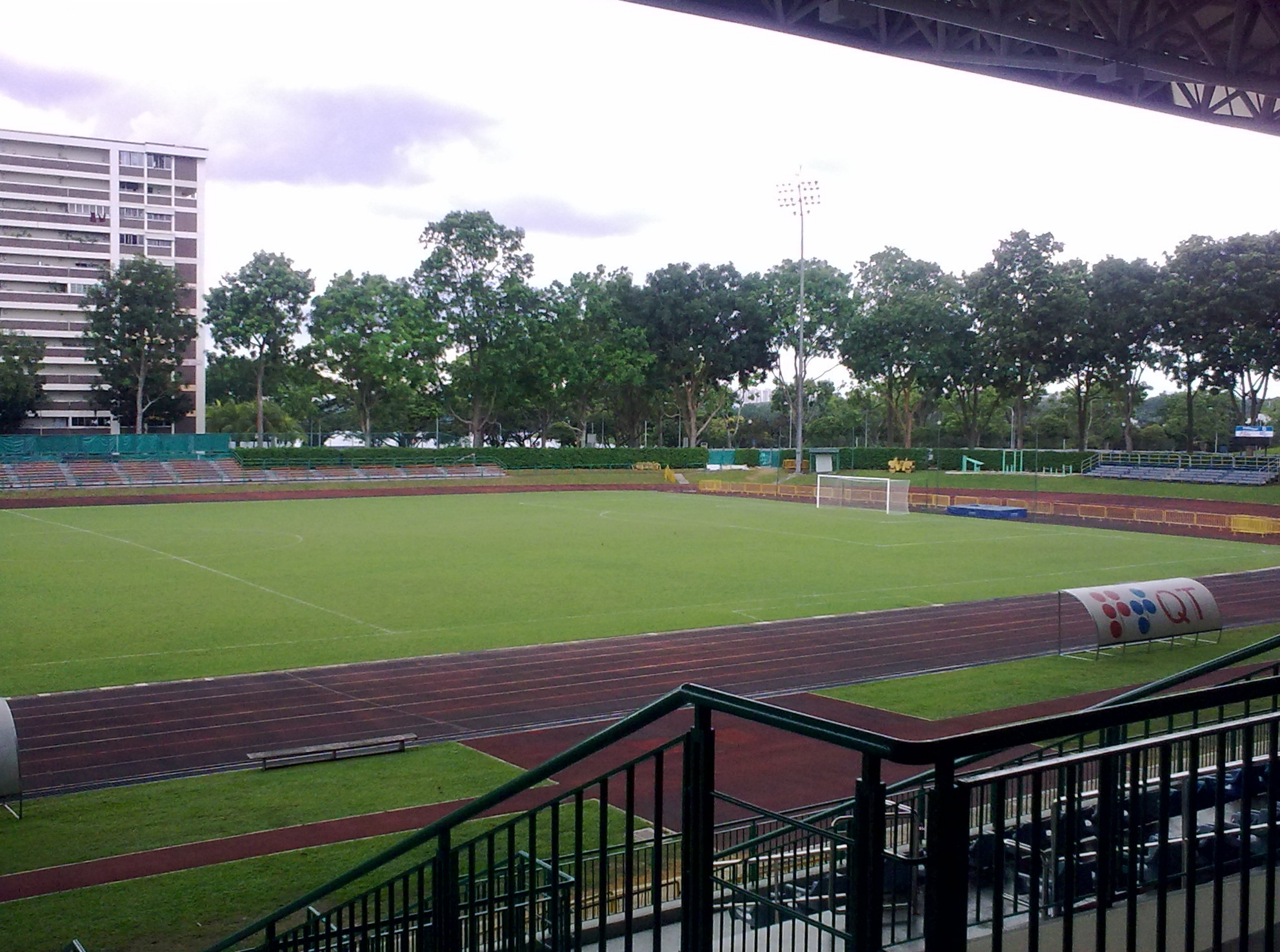
Yishun Stadium

Sembawang Rangers played most of its home games at the Yishun Stadium till its dissolvement in 2003. During its time, they represented the Northeastern corner of the North Region of Singapore.

== Continental record ==
Season	Competition	Round	Club	Home	Away	Position
1999-00	Asian Cup Winners' Cup	Second Round	(South Korea) Anyang LG Cheetahs	Withdrew		

== Seasons ==
Season	Pos	P	W	D	L	F	A	Pts	Singapore Cup
1996-1	7th	14	3	4	7	17	32	13	Preliminary
1996-2	6th	14	4	3	7	14	23	15	Preliminary
1997	8th	16	1	5	10	19	37	8	Semi-finals
1998	8th	20	6	1	13	18	37	19	Preliminary
1999	8th	22	5	8	9	30	36	23	Preliminary
2000	9th	22	5	7	10	17	37	22	Preliminary
2001	8th	33	8	7	18	45	80	31	Preliminary
2002	6th	33	15	5	13	59	67	50	Quarter-finals
2003	9th	33	6	5–7	15	35	56	35	Preliminary
