= 2012 Tampines Rovers FC season =

Tampines Rovers FC
- Chairman: Teo Hock Seng
- Manager: Steven Tan
- S.League: –
- AFC Cup: Group stage
Home colours	Away colours

The 2012 Tampines Rovers FC season involves Tampines Rovers competing in the 2012 S.League. They are also competing in the 2012 AFC Cup after winning the 2011 S.League.

== Squad ==
As of 6 January 2017.

=== Sleague ===
No.	Name	Nationality	Date of birth (age)	Previous club
Goalkeepers
1	Saša Dreven	(Croatia)	27 January 1990 (age 36)	(Croatia) NK Varaždin
18	Hafez Mawasi	(Singapore)	31 March 1983 (age 43)	(Singapore) Woodlands Wellington
20	Amran Addin	(Singapore)	25 June 1989 (age 37)	(Singapore) Gombak United
40	Arif Ali	(Singapore)	15 March 1991 (age 35)	
Defenders
2	Ismadi Mukhtar	(Singapore)	16 December 1983 (age 42)	(Singapore) Woodlands Wellington
3	Jufri Taha	(Singapore)	4 March 1985 (age 41)	(Singapore) Balestier Khalsa
4	Fahrudin Mustafic	(Singapore)	17 April 1981 (age 45)	(Indonesia) Persela Lamongan
11	Imran Sahib	(Singapore)	12 October 1982 (age 44)	(Singapore) Woodlands Wellington
12	Anaz Hadee	(Singapore)	24 September 1983 (age 43)	(Singapore) Balestier Khalsa
15	Benoît Croissant	(France)	9 August 1980 (age 46)	(Bahrain) Al-Najma SC
16	Ali Hudzaifi	(Singapore)	23 March 1992 (age 34)	Youth Team
19	Syaiful Iskandar	(Singapore)	19 March 1985 (age 41)	(Singapore) Home United
Midfielders
6	Sazali Salleh	(Singapore)	18 January 1980 (age 46)	(Singapore) Woodlands Wellington
14	Gligor Gligorov	(North Macedonia)	15 March 1987 (age 39)	(Czech Republic) FC Baník Ostrava
17	Jamil Ali	(Singapore)	2 May 1984 (age 42)	(Singapore) Woodlands Wellington
23	Haziq Azman	(Singapore)	1 July 1991 (age 35)	Youth Team
30	Roysn Yap	(Singapore)	30 January 1993 (age 33)	Youth Team
Forwards
5	Ahmed Fahmie	(Singapore)	20 April 1987 (age 39)	Youth Team
7	Ahmad Latiff	(Singapore)	29 May 1979 (age 47)	(Singapore) SAFSA
9	Aleksandar Duric	(Singapore) (Australia) (Serbia)	12 August 1970 (age 56)	(Singapore) SAFSA
10	Sead Hadžibulić	(Serbia)	30 January 1983 (age 43)	(Serbia) FK Hajduk Kula
13	Fazil Zailani	(Singapore)	22 March 1989 (age 37)	(Singapore) Home United Prime League
25	Fariq Ghani	(Singapore)	26 August 1993 (age 33)	Youth Team
Players who left club during season
8	Davor Piškor	(Croatia)	23 April 1982 (age 44)	(Croatia) NK Međimurje

== Competitions ==
=== S.League ===
==== League table ====
Pos	Team	Pld	W	D	L	GF	GA	GD	Pts	Qualification
1	Tampines Rovers	24	16	4	4	49	24	+25	52	Qualification to AFC Cup Group Stage
2	(Brunei) DPMM FC (Note: The three foreign clubs – Albirex Niigata (S), DPMM FC and Harimau Muda A – as well as the Football Association of Singapore (FAS) under-23 team, Young Lions, are not eligible for any AFC competition spots.)	24	15	3	6	49	27	+22	48	
3	(Japan) Albirex Niigata (S)	24	12	7	5	37	26	+11	43	
4	(Malaysia) Harimau Muda A	24	13	3	8	37	23	+14	42	
5	Home United	24	11	7	6	43	29	+14	40	

Source: RSSSF
Rules for classification: 1) points; 2) goal difference; 3) number of goals scored; 4) number of wins

==== Matches ====
12 February 2012 Match 1	Brunei DPMM FC	2–2	Tampines Rovers FC	Bandar Seri Begawan
20:15	Osman Bashiru 38'; Jerković 69'	Report	Mustafić 48'; Croissant (yellow card) 52'; Sahib (yellow card) 84'; Ismadi Mukhtar (yellow card) 85'; Ali 91'	Stadium: Sultan Hassanal Bolkiah Stadium; Referee: Abas Daud

16 February 2012 Match 2	Balestier Khalsa FC	1–0	Tampines Rovers FC	Toa Payoh
19:45	Ruhaizad Ismail 86'	Report	Imran Sahib (yellow card) 30'; Anaz Hadee (yellow card) 63'	Stadium: Toa Payoh Stadium; Referee: Leow Thaim Hoe

9 March 2012 Match 3	Tampines Rovers FC	4–0	Woodlands Wellington FC	Clementi, Singapore
19:45	Đurić 1', 24', 51' (yellow card) 61'; Mustafić 36'	Report	K Sathiaraj (yellow card) 90'	Stadium: Clementi Stadium; Referee: Muhid Taqi

15 March 2012 Match 4	Tampines Rovers FC	2–1	Tanjong Pagar United FC	Clementi, Singapore
19:45	Ismadi Mukhtar 39'; Jamil Ali 90'	Report	Kawanabe (yellow card) 41' (goal) 59'; Zahid Ahmad (yellow card) 84'	Stadium: Clementi Stadium; Referee: Abdul Malik

25 March 2012 Match 5	Tampines Rovers FC	1–1	Hougang United FC	Clementi, Singapore
19:45	Ali Hudzaifi (yellow card) 26'; Anaz Hadee (yellow card) 49'; Croissant 90+3'; Saša Dreven (yellow card) 90+5'	Report	Azhar Sairudin (red card) 26'; Fazli Jaffar (yellow card) 31'; Mamadou M. Diallo 47'; Nurhilmi Jasni (yellow card) 72'	Stadium: Clementi Stadium; Referee: Sukhbir Singh

29 March 2012 Match 6	Home United FC	0–2	Tampines Rovers FC	Bishan
19:45	Arai (yellow card) 21'; Jeremy Chiang (yellow card) 76'; Anzité (yellow card) 87'	Report	Đurić 37'; Sazali Salleh (yellow card) 51'; Imran Sahib (yellow card) 58'; Ahmed Fahmie 83'	Stadium: Jalan Besar Stadium; Referee: W Ravisanthiran

=== Singapore Cup ===
==== Preliminary round ====
16 May 2012	Tampines Rovers	4–3	(Cambodia) Phnom Penh Crown	Clementi Stadium
19:45	Đurić 42', 63'; Jamil 45+1'; Imran 45+3'	Report	Borey 15'; Sokumpheak 57', 59'	Attendance: 487; Referee: W. Ravisanthiran

==== Quarter-finals ====
2 July 2012 1st Leg	Albirex Niigata (Japan)	1–2	Tampines Rovers	Jurong East Stadium
19:45	Yamakoshi 22'	Report	Taha 50'; Latiff 79'	Attendance: 742; Referee: K Kalimuthu

6 July 2012 2nd Leg	Tampines Rovers	2–0	(Japan) Albirex Niigata (S)	Clementi Stadium
19:45	Hadžibulić 16'; Jamil Ali 60'	Report		Referee: Abdul Malik

==== Semi-finals ====
4 October 2012 1st Leg	Tampines Rovers	2–0	(Philippines) Loyola Meralco Sparks	Clementi Stadium
19:45	Đurić 29'; Latiff 50'	Report

7 October 2012 2nd Leg	Loyola Meralco Sparks (Philippines)	0–3	Tampines Rovers	Jalan Besar Stadium
19:45		Preview; Details; Report	Đurić 78', 84'; Sahib 90+5'	Referee: Yazeen Buhari

==== Final ====
28 October 2012	SAFFC	2–1	Tampines Rovers	Jalan Besar Stadium
19:45	Sakurada 78'; Gunawan 90+2'	Preview; Details	Jantan 25' (o.g.)	Referee: Muhd Taqi

=== Singapore League Cup ===
Pos	Team	Pld	W	D	L	GF	GA	GD	Pts
1	Tampines Rovers (A)	2	1	1	0	4	2	+2	4
2	Gombak United (A)	2	0	2	0	2	2	0	2
3	Woodlands Wellington	2	0	1	1	2	4	−2	1

Updated to match(es) played on 2 August 2012. Source: sleague.com
Rules for classification: 1) points; 2) goal difference; 3) number of goals scored.
(A) Advance to a further round

27 July 2012 Group D	Tampines Rovers FC	3–1	Woodlands Wellington FC	Clementi Stadium
21:30 BST	Ali 51'; Đurić 56', 68'	Report	Basri (yellow card) 58'; Yap 67'	Referee: Ahmad A'Qashah

2 August 2012 Group D	Gombak United FC	1–1	Tampines Rovers FC	Jurong West Sports and Recreation Centre
21:30 BST	Durand 14'; Anderson (yellow card) 58'	Report	Yunos 63' (o.g.); Salleh (yellow card) 90+1'	Referee: Yazeen Buhari

5 August 2012 Quarter Final	Tampines Rovers FC	3–3 (a.e.t.) (6–5 p)	Albirex Niigata Singapore FC	Clementi Stadium
21:30 BST	Hadžibulić 40'; Gligorov 73'; Mustafić (yellow card) 100'; Đurić (yellow card) 119'; Khamaruddin 120'	Report	Kamimura 37', 66'; Shimono 97'; Keisuke Matsui (yellow card) 105'	Referee: Abdul Bin Abdul Bashir

8 August 2012 Semi Final	Geylang United FC	2–0	Tampines Rovers FC	Bedok Stadium
21:45 BST	Kapláň 45'; Jalal Jalal (yellow card) 79'; Stefan Milojević 83'; Mun Seung-Man (yellow card) 88'	Report	Salleh (yellow card) 39'	Referee: Leow Hoe

=== AFC Cup ===
Team	Pld	W	D	L	GF	GA	GD	Pts	KIT	TER	SNA	TAM
(Hong Kong) Kitchee	6	3	2	1	9	4	+5	11		2–2	2–0	3–1
(Malaysia) Terengganu	6	3	1	2	10	8	+2	10	0–2		6–2	0–2
(Vietnam) Sông Lam Nghệ An	6	2	1	3	6	9	−3	7	1–0	0–1		3–0
(Singapore) Tampines Rovers	6	1	2	3	3	7	−4	5	0–0	0–1	0–0	

Legend: Blue = home team win; Yellow = draw; Red = away team win.

6 March 2012 Group stage	Kitchee (Hong Kong)	3–1	(Singapore) Tampines Rovers	Tseung Kwan O Sports Ground, Hong Kong
20:00 UTC+08:00	Liang Zicheng 3', 62'; Jordi 66'	Report	Ali 20'	Attendance: 1,314; Referee: (Myanmar) Sgt Win Cho

20 March 2012 Group stage	Tampines Rovers (Singapore)	0–0	(Vietnam) Sông Lam Nghệ An	Bishan Stadium, Singapore
19:30 UTC+08:00	Khamaruddin (yellow card) 90+3'	Report	Phan Doãn Thái Thành Đạt (yellow card) 13'; Trần Tuấn Anh (yellow card) 45'	Attendance: 368; Referee: (China) Ma Ning

4 April 2012 Group stage	Tampines Rovers (Singapore)	0–1	(Malaysia) Terengganu	Jalan Besar Stadium, Singapore
19:30 UTC+08:00	Mustafić (yellow card) 65'; Salleh (yellow card) 80'	Report	Tie 4'; Azmi (yellow card) 75'; Shamsuddin (yellow card) 81'	Attendance: 801; Referee: (South Korea) Kim Jong-Hyeok

10 April 2012 Group stage	Terengganu (Malaysia)	0–2	(Singapore) Tampines Rovers	Sultan Ismail Nasiruddin Shah Stadium, Kuala Terengganu
20:45 UTC+08:00	Tie (yellow card) 28'	Report	Mustafić (yellow card) 28'; Đurić 37', 90'; Sahib (yellow card) 56'	Attendance: 2,500; Referee: (Turkmenistan) Kurbanov Charymurat

25 April 2012 Group stage	Tampines Rovers (Singapore)	0–0	(Hong Kong) Kitchee	Jalan Besar Stadium, Singapore
19:30 UTC+08:00	Croissant (yellow card) 42'; Fahmie (yellow card) 71'	Report	Liu Quankun (yellow card) 41'; Tsang Kam To (yellow card) 60'	Attendance: 710; Referee: (Sri Lanka) H. Dilan Perera

9 May 2012 Group stage	Sông Lam Nghệ An (Vietnam)	3–0	(Singapore) Tampines Rovers	Vinh Stadium, Vinh
16:00 UTC+07:00	Lê Thế Cường 6', 45'; Hồ Ngọc Luận (yellow card) 14'; Dieng 20'	Report	David Piškor (yellow card) 78'; Salleh (yellow card) 88'	Attendance: 800; Referee: (South Korea) Ko Hyung-Jin
