= 2012 S.League =

S. League
- Season: 2012
- Champions: Tampines Rovers; 4th S.League title
- AFC Cup: Tampines Rovers (S.League winners); Singapore Armed Forces (Singapore Cup winners)
- Matches: 156
- Goals: 424 (2.72 per match)
- Top goalscorer: (France) Frédéric Mendy (20)
- Biggest home win: Singapore Armed Forces 6-1 Gombak United (22 October 2012)
- Biggest away win: Geylang United 1-7 Home United (11 March 2012)
- Highest scoring: Home United 7-3 Geylang United (18 July 2012)

The 2012 S.League was the 17th season of the S-League, the top professional football league in Singapore. It is known as the Great Eastern-Yeo's S.League for sponsorship reasons.

Tampines Rovers won their fourth title, finishing top of a 13-team league.

== Teams ==
Etoile FC withdrew their participation in the league to concentrate on grassroots football and youth development. DPMM FC have re-entered the league, coming back since they were suspended by FIFA in the 2009 campaign. Harimau Muda of Malaysia have also entered the fray.

Location of teams in 2012 S.League
Location of teams in 2012 S.League (Singapore teams)

Team	Coach	Stadium	Capacity	Location
(Japan) Albirex Niigata (S)	(Japan) Koichi Sugiyama	Jurong East Stadium	2,700	Jurong East
Balestier Khalsa	(Australia) Darren Stewart	Toa Payoh Stadium	3,900	Toa Payoh
(Brunei) DPMM FC	(Croatia) Vjeran Simunić	Hassanal Bolkiah National Stadium	30,000	Bandar Seri Begawan, Brunei
Geylang United	V. Kanakarajan	Bedok Stadium	3,900	Bedok
Gombak United	K. Balagumaran	Jurong West Stadium	3,200	Jurong West
(Malaysia) Harimau Muda	(Malaysia) Ong Kim Swee	Yishun Stadium	3,400	Yishun
Home United	(South Korea) Lee Lim-Saeng	Bishan Stadium	4,100	Bishan
Hougang United	(Croatia) Nenad Bacina	Hougang Stadium	2,500	Hougang
Singapore Armed Forces	Richard Bok	Choa Chu Kang Stadium	4,600	Choa Chu Kang
Tampines Rovers	Tay Peng Kee	Clementi Stadium	4,000	Clementi
Tanjong Pagar United	Terry Pathmanathan	Queenstown Stadium	3,800	Queenstown
Woodlands Wellington	Salim Moin	Woodlands Stadium	4,300	Woodlands
(Singapore) Young Lions	Robin Chitrakar	Jalan Besar Stadium	8,000	Kallang

=== Managerial changes ===
Team	Outgoing manager	Manner of departure	Replaced by
Geylang United	Mike Wong	Moved to Prime League squad	V. Kanakarajan
Tampines Rovers	Steven Tan	Moved to Prime League squad	Tay Peng Kee

=== Stadium changes ===
- Tampines Rovers moved into the Clementi Stadium due to the early commencement of the Tampines Sports Hub project which makes the Tampines Stadium unusable.
- With Tampines moving into the Clementi Stadium, Tanjong Pagar United are moving out and back to the Queenstown Stadium which they previously vacated back in 2004. Queenstown Stadium was last used by Etoile FC.

=== Foreign players ===
Club	Player 1	Player 2	Player 3	Player 4	Former Player
Balestier Khalsa	(South Korea) Park Kang-jin	(Australia) Goran Šubara	(New Zealand) Paul Cunningham	(Montenegro) Zdravko Dragićević	(South Korea) Jang Jo-yoon
(Brunei) DPMM FC	(Brazil) Patrick da Silva	(Brazil) Tales dos Santos	(Croatia) Ivan Jerković	(Ghana) Osman Bashiru	(Brazil) Rodrigo Gral
Geylang United	(South Korea) Mun Seung-man	(France) Stefan Milojević	(Slovakia) Jozef Kapláň	(England) Michael King	(England) Rhema Obed (England) Oliver Nicholas
Gombak United	(South Korea) Jung Hee-bong	(England) Christoper Anderson	(Nigeria) Obadin Aikhena	(France) Julien Durand	None
Home United	(Japan) Kenji Arai	(Japan) Shotaro Ihata	(Central African Republic) Franklin Anzite	(France) Frederic Mendy	None
Hougang United	(Canada) Jordan Webb	(Croatia) Stanislav Vidaković	(Croatia) Ante Barać	(Guinea) Mamadou M. Diallo	None
Singapore Armed Forces	(Japan) Tatsuro Inui	(Japan) Shimpei Sakurada	(Bosnia and Herzegovina) Mislav Karoglan	(Croatia) Marin Vidošević	(Japan) Seiji Saito
Tampines Rovers	(Croatia) Saša Dreven	(France) Benoit Croissant	(North Macedonia) Gligor Gligorov	(Serbia) Sead Hadžibulić	(Croatia) Davor Piškor
Tanjong Pagar United	(Japan) Takaya Kawanabe	(Haiti) Gilbert Bayonne	(France) Anthony Aymard	(Argentina) Carlos Delgado	(Korea) Jang In-jun (Korea) Lee Joo-sang
Woodlands Wellington	(South Korea) Moon Soon-Ho	(Australia) Hussein Akil	(England) Daniel Hammond	(Trinidad and Tobago) Fabien Lewis	None
(Singapore) Young Lions	(Canada) Sherif El-Masri	(Denmark) Benjamin Lee	(France) Jonathan Toto	(France) Sirina Camara	None

- Albirex Niigata (S) and Harimau Muda are not allowed hire any foreigners.

== League table ==
Pos	Team	Pld	W	D	L	GF	GA	GD	Pts	Qualification
1	Tampines Rovers	24	16	4	4	49	24	+25	52	Qualification to AFC Cup Group Stage
2	(Brunei) DPMM FC (Note: The three foreign clubs – Albirex Niigata (S), DPMM FC and Harimau Muda A – as well as the Football Association of Singapore (FAS) under-23 team, Young Lions, are not eligible for any AFC competition spots.)	24	15	3	6	49	27	+22	48	
3	(Japan) Albirex Niigata (S)	24	12	7	5	37	26	+11	43	
4	(Malaysia) Harimau Muda A	24	13	3	8	37	23	+14	42	
5	Home United	24	11	7	6	43	29	+14	40	
6	Balestier Khalsa	24	11	6	7	23	20	+3	39	
7	Singapore Armed Forces	24	9	5	10	43	41	+2	32	Qualification to AFC Cup Group Stage (Note: Qualified as 2012 Singapore Cup winners.)
8	Hougang United	24	7	8	9	31	33	−2	29	
9	Gombak United	24	7	8	9	23	29	−6	29	
10	(Singapore) Young Lions	24	6	5	13	25	37	−12	23	
11	Geylang United	24	5	6	13	28	50	−22	21	
12	Tanjong Pagar United	24	5	5	14	17	41	−24	20	
13	Woodlands Wellington	24	3	5	16	19	44	−25	14	

Source: RSSSF
Rules for classification: 1) points; 2) goal difference; 3) number of goals scored; 4) number of wins

== Results ==
Home \ Away	ALB	BAL	DPM	GLI	GOM	HMA	HOM	HOU	SAF	TAM	TPU	WLW	YLI
Albirex Niigata (S)		1–2	2–0	1–1	1–0	1–0	0–0	2–3	3–2	1–0	4–1	2–0	2–2
Balestier Khalsa	1–0		1–3	0–0	1–1	2–0	1–0	0–3	1–0	1–0	1–1	2–0	2–0
Brunei DPMM	2–1	0–2		4–1	1–1	1–2	3–2	5–1	1–2	2–2	3–2	3–0	1–0
Geylang United	0–0	3–1	1–3		3–2	0–2	1–7	1–2	3–0	1–5	0–0	1–1	2–0
Gombak United	0–0	1–0	0–3	2–0		0–2	1–2	2–1	0–1	1–1	0–0	0–0	1–0
Harimau Muda	0–0	2–0	1–1	3–1	1–2		0–3	3–1	4–1	2–3	3–0	2–1	3–1
Home United	4–2	0–0	1–0	7–3	1–1	2–1		1–1	0–3	0–2	2–1	3–1	3–1
Hougang United	1–2	0–1	1–3	2–0	0–0	0–0	1–2		2–2	1–1	1–1	2–2	0–2
Singapore Armed Forces	3–4	0–0	1–2	2–2	6–1	1–2	3–3	1–0		2–3	0–1	2–1	4–3
Tampines Rovers	3–4	3–1	1–0	2–1	3–2	1–0	2–0	1–1	0–1		2–1	4–0	2–1
Tanjong Pagar United	0–2	1–0	0–3	1–0	0–3	0–2	1–0	0–1	1–3	1–2		2–3	0–5
Woodlands Wellington	0–1	0–2	1–2	3–1	1–2	0–2	0–0	1–3	2–2	0–3	0–1		1–2
Young Lions	1–1	1–1	1–3	0–2	1–0	1–0	0–0	0–3	2–1	0–3	1–1	0–1	

Updated to match(es) played on 1 November 2012. Source: Soccerway
Legend: Blue = home team win; Yellow = draw; Red = away team win.

== Season statistics ==
=== Goalscorers ===
As of 25 October 2012.

Rank	Player	Club	Goals
1	(France) Frédéric Mendy	Home United	20
2	(Slovakia) Jozef Kapláň	Geylang United	14
2	(Bosnia and Herzegovina) Mislav Karoglan	Singapore Armed Forces	14
4	(Brunei) Shahrazen Said	(Brunei) DPMM FC	13
5	(Canada) Jordan Webb	Hougang United	12
5	(Japan) Yasuhiro Yamakoshi	(Japan) Albirex Niigata (S)	12
5	Aleksandar Đurić	Tampines Rovers	12
8	(Japan) Shotaro Ihata	Home United	10
9	Fazrul Nawaz	Singapore Armed Forces	9
9	(Japan) Shimpei Sakurada	Singapore Armed Forces	9
11	(Bosnia and Herzegovina) Sead Hadžibulić	Tampines Rovers	8

== Attendance figures ==
Pos	Team	Total	High	Low	Average	Change
1	(Brunei) DPMM FC	25,190	8,672	4,680		n/a
2	Balestier Khalsa	7,760	2,386	889		n/a
3	Singapore Armed Forces	7,525	1,786	1,155		n/a
4	Home United	6,856	1,354	774		n/a
5	(Japan) Albirex Niigata (S)	6,732	2,502	1,227		n/a
6	Gombak United	5,223	1,494	816		n/a
7	(Malaysia) Harimau Muda	3,869	1,388	388		n/a
8	Hougang United	3,611	1,243	410		n/a
9	Tampines Rovers	2,923	1,228	485		n/a
10	Woodlands Wellington	2,212	688	429		n/a
11	(Singapore) Young Lions	2,202	668	464		n/a
12	Geylang United	2,152	912	612		n/a
13	Tanjong Pagar United	2,065	755	195		n/a
	League total					n/a

Source: S.League

== S-League Awards Night Winners ==
Awards	Winners
Player of the Year	Aleksandar Đurić (Tampines Rovers)
Young Player of the Year	(Malaysia) Wan Zack Haikal ( (Malaysia) Harimau Muda A)
Coach of the Year	(Croatia) Vjeran Simunić ( (Brunei) DPMM FC)
Top Scorer Award	(France) Frédéric Mendy (Home United)
Fair Play Award	(Japan) Albirex Niigata (S)
Referee of the Year	Abdul Malik Abdul Bashir
