= 2012 Home United FC season =

Home United FC
- Chairman: Koh Siong Ling
- Manager: Lee Lim-Saeng
- S.League: –
- AFC Cup: Group stage
Home colours	Away colours

Home United competed in the 2012 S.League. They also competed in the 2012 AFC Cup, after winning the 2011 Singapore Cup.

== Squad ==
=== S.League squad ===
Squad No.	Name	Nationality	Date of birth (age)	Last Club
Goalkeepers
1	Nazri Sabri	(Singapore)	20 September 1989 (age 37)	(Singapore) Geylang International
18	Lionel Lewis	(Singapore)	16 December 1982 (age 43)	(Singapore) Young Lions FC
22	Nur Azreen Azman	(Singapore)	18 January 1989 (age 37)	Youth Team
Defenders
2	Jeremy Chiang	(Singapore)	11 April 1985 (age 41)	(Singapore) Gombak United
3	Kenji Arai	(Japan)	19 May 1978 (age 48)	(Singapore) Sengkang Punggol
4	Rosman Sulaiman	(Singapore)	6 November 1982 (age 44)	(Singapore) Young Lions FC
5	Kairuldin Ishak	(Singapore)	4 June 1987 (age 39)	Youth Team
6	Sofiyan Hamid	(Singapore)	18 March 1985 (age 41)	(Singapore) Geylang International
11	Franklin Clovis Anzité	(Central African Republic)	2 November 1985 (age 41)	(Singapore) Étoile FC
24	Redzwan Atan	(Singapore)	7 October 1990 (age 36)	Youth Team
37	Safwan Ramlan	(Singapore)	31 December 1990 (age 35)	Youth Team
38	Justin Khiang	(Singapore)	16 December 1992 (age 33)	(Singapore) Tanjong Pagar United
Midfielders
7	Shi Jiayi	(Singapore) (China)	8 November 1993 (age 33)	(Singapore) Young Lions FC
8	John Wilkinson	(Singapore) (England)	24 August 1979 (age 47)	(Thailand) Insee Police United F.C.
12	Firdaus Idros	(Singapore)	12 August 1986 (age 40)	(Singapore) Young Lions FC
14	Rhysh Roshan Rai	(Singapore)	23 April 1985 (age 41)	Singapore Armed Forces FC
20	Nor Azli Yusoff	(Singapore)	29 April 1983 (age 43)	(Singapore) Hougang United
21	Song Ui-young	(South Korea)	8 November 1993 (age 33)	(South Korea) Suwon FC
Strikers
9	Shotaro Ihata	(Japan)	12 February 1987 (age 39)	(Singapore) Albirex Niigata (S)
10	Frédéric Mendy	(Guinea-Bissau) (France)	18 September 1988 (age 38)	(Singapore) Étoile FC
16	Qiu Li	(Singapore) (China)	6 June 1981 (age 45)	(Singapore) Tampines Rovers
17	Masrezwan Masturi	(Singapore)	17 February 1981 (age 45)	(Singapore) Tanjong Pagar United
19	Indra Sahdan	(Singapore)	5 March 1979 (age 47)	(Singapore) Keppel Monaco FC
Player who left during mid season
15	Hafiz Nor	(Singapore)	22 August 1988 (age 38)	(Singapore) Tanjong Pagar United
22	Zulfadhli Emran	(Singapore)	17 February 1989 (age 37)	(Singapore) Gombak United

== Transfers ==
=== Pre-season transfers ===
==== In ====
Position	Player	Transferred From	Ref
GK	(Singapore) Nazri Sabri	(Singapore) Geylang International	
DF	(Singapore) Jeremy Chiang	(Singapore) Gombak United	
DF	(Singapore) Sofiyan Hamid	(Singapore) Geylang International	
DF	(Central African Republic) Franklin Clovis Anzité	(Singapore) Etoile FC	
MF	(Singapore) (England) John Wilkinson	(Thailand) Insee Police United F.C.	
MF	(Singapore) Rhysh Roshan Rai	Singapore Armed Forces FC	
FW	(Singapore) Indra Sahdan	(Singapore) Keppel Monaco FC	
FW	(Singapore) Hafiz Nor	(Singapore) Tanjong Pagar United	
FW	(Japan) Shotaro Ihata	(Singapore) Albirex Niigata (S)	
FW	(South Korea) Song Ui-young	(South Korea) Suwon FC	

==== Out ====
Position	Player	Transferred From	Ref
GK	(Singapore) Siddiq Durimi	(Singapore) Admiralty FC	
GK	(Singapore) Fajar Sarib	(Singapore) Tanjong Pagar United	
GK	(Singapore) Neezam Aziz	(Singapore) Young Lions FC	
DF	(Singapore) Juma'at Jantan	(Singapore) LionsXII	
DF	(Singapore) Abdil Qaiyyim Mutalib	(Singapore) LionsXII	
DF	(Cameroon) Valery Hiek	(Thailand) Bangkok Glass F.C.	
MF	(Singapore) Isa Halim	(Singapore) LionsXII	
MF	(Singapore) Firdaus Kasman	(Singapore) LionsXII	
MF	(Singapore) Yasir Hanapi	(Singapore) LionsXII	
MF	(Singapore) Asraf Rashid	(Singapore) Tanjong Pagar United	
MF	(Singapore) Faizal Samad	(Singapore) Geylang International	
MF	(Singapore) Farizal Basri	(Singapore) Woodlands Wellington	
MF	(Singapore) Khairul Anwar Hanaf		
FW	(Canada) Sherif El-Masri	(Singapore) Young Lions FC	
FW	(Singapore) Sufian Anuar	(Singapore) LionsXII	
FW	(South Korea) Lee Sang-ha		
FW	(South Korea) Kim Dae-eui	Retired	

=== Mid-season transfers ===
==== In ====
Position	Player	Transferred From	Ref
MF	(Singapore) Justin Khiang	(Singapore) Tanjong Pagar United	National Service

==== Out ====
Position	Player	Transferred From	Ref
DF	(Singapore) Shahril Alias	(Singapore) Hougang United	
DF	(Singapore) Zulfadhli Emran	(Singapore) Gombak United	
MF	(Singapore) Zulfadli Zainal Abidin	(Singapore) Warriors FC	
FW	(Singapore) Hafiz Nor	(Singapore) Tanjong Pagar United	

== Team statistics ==
=== Appearances and goals ===
Numbers in parentheses denote appearances as substitute.

No.	Pos.	Player	Sleague		Singapore Cup		League Cup		AFC Cup		Total	
No.	Pos.	Player	Apps.	Goals	Apps.	Goals	Apps.	Goals	Apps.	Goals	Apps.	Goals
1	GK	(Singapore) Nazri Sabri	7	0	2	0	0	0	0	0	9	0
2	DF	(Singapore) Jeremy Chiang	20	1	2	0	3	0	7	0	32	1
3	DF	(Japan) Kenji Arai	20	0	3	0	3	0	6	0	32	0
4	DF	(Singapore) Rosman Sulaiman	10	0	3	0	3	0	3	0	19	0
5	DF	(Singapore) Kairuldin Ishak	1	0	0	0	0	0	1	0	2	0
6	DF	(Singapore) Sofiyan Hamid	16	0	3	0	3	0	3	0	25	0
7	MF	(Singapore) (China) Shi Jiayi	18	1	2	1	3	0	6	0	29	2
8	MF	(Singapore) (England) John Wilkinson	12	0	3	1	0	0	5	0	20	1
9	FW	(Japan) Shotaro Ihata	22	10	1	0	3	0	7	1	33	11
10	FW	(Guinea-Bissau) (France) Frédéric Mendy	24	20	2	2	2	0	7	4	35	26
11	DF	(Central African Republic) Franklin Clovis Anzité	16	1	2	1	3	0	7	1	28	3
12	MF	(Singapore) Firdaus Idros	22	1	3	0	3	1	7	0	35	2
14	MF	(Singapore) Rhysh Roshan Rai	11	0	1	0	1	0	1	0	14	0
16	FW	(Singapore) (China) Qiu Li	18	6	2	0	3	0	6	2	29	8
17	FW	(Singapore) Masrezwan Masturi	20	0	1	0	3	0	5	0	29	0
18	GK	(Singapore) Lionel Lewis	17	0	1	0	3	0	7	0	28	0
19	FW	(Singapore) Indra Sahdan	21	2	3	0	3	3	7	1	34	6
20	MF	(Singapore) Nor Azli Yusoff	20	0	3	0	3	0	6	0	32	0
21	MF	(South Korea) Song Ui-young	6	1	1	0	0	0	0	0	7	1
24	DF	(Singapore) Redzwan Atan	0	0	0	0	0	0	0	0	0	0
31	GK	(Singapore) Nur Azreen Azman	0	0	0	0	0	0	0	0	0	0
36	FW	(Singapore) Hanafi Ghazali	0	0	1	0	0	0	0	0	1	0
37	DF	(Singapore) Safwan Ramlan	0	0	0	0	0	0	0	0	0	0
38	DF	(Singapore) Justin Khiang	2	0	0	0	0	0	0	0	2	0
39	FW	(Singapore) Shaheer Afiq	2	0	0	0	0	0	0	0	2	0
40	GK	(Singapore) Asyraf Asyfar Selamat	0	0	0	0	0	0	0	0	0	0
Players who have played this season but had left the club or on loan to other club
15	FW	(Singapore) Hafiz Nor	5	0	1	0	0	0	3	0	8	0
22	DF	(Singapore) Zulfadhli Emran	0	0	2	0	2	0	0	0	4	0

-->

-->

== Competitions ==
=== S.League ===
==== League table ====
Pos	Team	Pld	W	D	L	GF	GA	GD	Pts	Qualification
3	(Japan) Albirex Niigata (S) (Note: The three foreign clubs – Albirex Niigata (S), DPMM FC and Harimau Muda A – as well as the Football Association of Singapore (FAS) under-23 team, Young Lions, are not eligible for any AFC competition spots.)	24	12	7	5	37	26	+11	43	
4	(Malaysia) Harimau Muda A	24	13	3	8	37	23	+14	42	
5	Home United	24	11	7	6	43	29	+14	40	
6	Balestier Khalsa	24	11	6	7	23	20	+3	39	
7	Singapore Armed Forces	24	9	5	10	43	41	+2	32	Qualification to AFC Cup Group Stage (Note: Qualified as 2012 Singapore Cup winners.)

Source: RSSSF
Rules for classification: 1) points; 2) goal difference; 3) number of goals scored; 4) number of wins

==== Matches ====
10 February 2012 1	Home United	0–0	Balestier Khalsa	Bishan Stadium
		Report		Attendance: 1,354; Referee: Sukhbir Singh

16 February 2012 2	Home United	1–1	Gombak United	Bishan Stadium
	Franklin Anzité 84'	Report	25' Mustaqim Manzur	Attendance: 1,304; Referee: Muhd Taqi

4 March 2012 3	SAAFC	3–3	Home United	Choa Chu Kang Stadium
	Farzul Nawaz 75', 85'; Tatsuro Inui 82'	Report	22', 77' Qiu Li; 65' Shotaro Ihata	Attendance: 1,506; Referee: Abas Daud

11 March 2012 4	Geylang United	1–7	Home United	Bedok Stadium
	Michael King 68'	Report	13', 36', 43', 65' Shotaro Ihata; 45', 55' Frédéric Mendy; 49' (o.g.) Syed Fadhil	Attendance: 612; Referee: Ahmad A'Qashah

15 March 2012 5	Hougang United	1–2	Home United	Jalan Besar Stadium
	Stanislav Vidaković 80'	Report	42' (pen.) Qiu Li; 56' Shotaro Ihata	Attendance: 583; Referee: Muhd Taqi

25 March 2012 6	Home United	4–2	Albirex Niigata	Bishan Stadium
	Frédéric Mendy 23', 66'; Shotaro Ihata 29'; Qiu Li 64' (pen.)	Report	4', 65' Sho Kamimura	Referee: Abdul Malik Bin Abdul Bashir

29 March 2012 7	Home United	0–2	Tampines Rovers	Bishan Stadium
12:45	Arai (yellow card) 21'; Daud (yellow card) 35'; Jeremy Chiang (yellow card) 76'; Anzité (yellow card) 87'	Summary	Đurić 37'; Salleh (yellow card) 51'; Sahib (yellow card) 58'; Fahmie 83'	Attendance: 774; Referee: W.Ravisanthiran

8 April 2012 8	Home United	2–1	Harimau Muda	Bishan Stadium
12:45	Ihata 13' (yellow card) 42'; Mendy (yellow card) 44' (goal) 61'; Nor Azli Yusoff (yellow card) 72'; Sofiyan Abdul Hamid (yellow card) 80'	Summary	Bakri (yellow card) 38' (goal) 50'; Ambumamee (yellow card) 52'; Robbat (yellow card) 62'	Attendance: 1,164; Referee: Yazeen Buhari

19 April 2012 9	Home United	1–0	DPMM	Bishan Stadium
12:45	Mendy 3'; Ihata (yellow card) 43'; Sofiyan Abdul Hamid (yellow card) 75'; Lewis (yellow card) 80'; Nor Azli Yusoff (yellow card) 81'	Summary	Sairol Sahari (yellow card) 65'; Azwan Salleh (yellow card) 65'; Bashiru (yellow card) 88'	Attendance: 1,006; Referee: Leow Thiam Hoe

28 April 2012 10	Tanjong Pagar United	1–0	Home United	Queenstown Stadium
12:45	Kawanabe 67'	Summary		Referee: Leow Thiam Hoe

5 May 2012 11	Home United	3–1	Woodlands Wellington	Bishan Stadium
11:45	Mendy 40', 46', 79'; Sulaiman (yellow card) 52'	Report	K Sathiaraj (yellow card) 22'; Akil 45'; Dolah (yellow card) 87'	Referee: K.Kalimuthu

13 May 2012 12	Home United	3–1	Young Lions	Bishan Stadium
11:45	Jiayi (yellow card) 12'; Firdaus Idros 15'; Wilkinson (yellow card) 34'; Mendy 49', 78'; Anzité (yellow card) 59'; Arai (yellow card) 67'; Masturi (yellow card) 81'	Report	Toto 4'	Referee: Ahmad A'Qashah

17 June 2012 13	Balestier Khalsa	1–0	Home United	Toa Payoh Stadium
12:45	Zulkiffli Hassim 24'; Park Kang-Jin (yellow card) 63'; Ismail (yellow card) 90+2'; Kim Min-Ho (yellow card) 90+3'	Report	Arai (yellow card) 29'; Li (yellow card) 31'; Nor Azli Yusoff (yellow card) 39'; Rai (yellow card) 90'	Referee: W.Ravisanthiran

22 June 2012 14	Gombak United	1–2	Home United	Jurong West Sports and Recreation Centre
12:45	Manzur 25'; Anderson (yellow card) 52'; Hasan (yellow card) 63'; Lounis (yellow card) 76' (yellow-red card) 83'	Report	Sofiyan Abdul Hamid (yellow card) 36'; Mendy 38'; Nor Azli Yusoff (yellow card) 40'; Daud 58'; Rai (yellow card) 68'; Sulaiman (yellow card) 80'	Referee: Leow Hoe

12 July 2012 15	Home United	0–3	Singapore Armed Forces	Bishan Stadium
12:45	Sulaiman (yellow card) 76'; Anzité (red card) 79'; Firdaus Idros (yellow card) 90'	Report	Sakurada 4'; Nawaz 43'; Shafaein 66'; Jantan (yellow card) 79'	Referee: Abdul Malik Bashir

18 July 2012 16	Home United	7–3	Geylang United	Bishan Stadium
12:45	Li 36' (pen.) 56'; Wilkinson (yellow card) 37'; Ihata 50'; Mendy 67', 79', 84', 85'	Report	Kapláň 6', 90+1'; Khayrulhayat Jumat 41'; Zul Elhan Fahmie (yellow card) 46'; Stefan Milojević (yellow card) 86'	Referee: K.Kalimuthu

21 July 2012 17	Home United	1–1	Hougang United	Bishan Stadium
13:30	Sofiyan Abdul Hamid (yellow card) 52'; Mendy 80'	Report	Mamadou Diallo (yellow card) 13' (goal) 85'; Hamid Basit (yellow card) 23'; Webb (yellow card) 49'; Fazli Jaffar (yellow card) 72'; Faizal Amir (yellow card) 79'	Referee: P.Jeevanathan

23 August 2012 18	Albirex Niigata Singapore	0–0	Home United	Jurong East Stadium
12:45		Summary		Referee: Sukhbir Singh

30 August 2012 19	Tampines Rovers	2–0	Home United	Jalan Besar Stadium
12:45	Mustafić (yellow card) 24'; Đurić 29'; Hadžibulić 37'	Summary	Sofiyan Abdul Hamid (yellow card) 46'; Nor Azli Yusoff (yellow card) 87'	Referee: Muhd Taqi

15 September 2012 20	Harimau Muda	0–3	Home United	Yishun Stadium
19:45	Shas (yellow card) 72'; Ahmad Hazwan Bakri (yellow card) 83'	Report	Mendy 37', 53'; Firdaus Idros (yellow card) 48'; Ihata (yellow card) 71'; Rai (yellow card) 77'; Indra Sahdan Bin Daud 95'	Referee: Abdul Malik

29 September 2012 21	Brunei DPMM FC	3–2	Home United	Sultan Hassanal Bolkiah Stadium
19:45	Pg Sallehuddin Damit (yellow card) 31'; Jerković (yellow card) 37'; Adi Said 49'; Patrick da Silva 54'; Shahrulrizal Abd Rahman (yellow card) 61'; Subhi Abdilah (yellow card) 71'; Shahrazen Said 90+2'	Summary	Mendy 21' (yellow card) 39'; Shi Jiayi 45' (pen.); Masturi (yellow card) 75'; Sofiyan Abdul Hamid (yellow card) 79'	Referee: (Singapore) Abdul Bin Abdul Bashir

18 October 2012 22	Home United	2–1	Tanjong Pagar United FC	Bishan Stadium
19:45	Sofiyan Abdul Hamid (yellow card) 45'; Jeremy Chiang (yellow card) 46' (goal) 90+8'; Ihata 48'	Report	Osman (yellow card) 24'; Zahid Ahmad (yellow card) 33'; Aymard 47' (yellow card) 90'; Shamsudin Hashim (yellow card) 55'; Carlos Alberto Delgado (yellow card) 84'	Referee: Leow Thiam Hoe

25 October 2012 23	Woodlands Wellington	0–0	Home United	Woodlands Stadium
19:45	Chew (yellow card) 49'; Dolah (yellow card) 86'	Report	Song Ui Young (yellow card) 55'	Referee: Ahmad A'Qashah

2 November 2012 24	Young Lions	0–0	Home United	Jalan Besar Stadium
19:45	Camara (yellow card) 87'	Report	Song Ui Young (yellow card) 70'; Masturi (yellow card) 73'; Nor Azli Yusoff (yellow card) 89'	Referee: K Kalimuthu

=== Singapore Cup ===
17 May 2012 Last 16	DPMM FC	0–1	Home United	Bandar Seri Begawan
12:45	Mohammad Helmi Zambin (yellow card) 45'; Shahrazen Said (yellow card) 55'; Rosmin Kamis (yellow card) 68'	Report	Wilkinson 40'; Li (yellow card) 74'; Lewis (yellow card) 89'	Stadium: Sultan Hassanal Bolkiah Stadium; Referee: Sukhbir Singh

4 July 2012 QF Leg 1	Home United	1–2	Singapore Armed Forces FC	Bishan
12:45	Sulaiman (yellow card) 37'; Jiayi 45+3'	Report	Inui 38'; Rahman (yellow card) 43'; Sulaiman 50' (o.g.)	Stadium: Bishan Stadium; Referee: Yazeen Buhari

9 July 2012 QF Leg 2	Singapore Armed Forces FC	3–3 (5–4 agg.)	Home United	Choa Chu Kang
12:45	Sakurada 14'; Khalik (yellow card) 20'; Karoglan 52'; Inui 82'; Nawaz (yellow card) 87'; Jantan (yellow card) 90+1'	Report	Mendy 15', 70'; Arai (yellow card) 25'; Anzité 44'	Stadium: Choa Chu Kang Stadium; Referee: Muhd Taqi

=== Singapore League Cup ===
==== Group C ====
Pos	Team	Pld	W	D	L	GF	GA	GD	Pts
1	Home United (A)	2	2	0	0	3	0	+3	6
2	Hougang United (A)	2	1	0	1	2	3	−1	3
3	(Singapore) Young Lions	2	0	0	2	1	3	−2	0

Updated to match(es) played on 1 August 2012. Source: sleague.com
Rules for classification: 1) points; 2) goal difference; 3) number of goals scored.
(A) Advance to a further round

26 July 2012 Group C	Home United FC	1–0	Courts Young Lions	Bishan
20:30	Firdaus Idros 6'	Report	El-Masri (yellow card) 37'; Hafiz Abu Sujad (yellow card) 79'; Nazrul Ahmad Nazari (yellow card) 89'	Stadium: Bishan Stadium; Referee: Abdul Malik

1 August 2012 Group C	Hougang United FC	0–2	Home United FC	Hougang
20:30	Ridhwan Osman (yellow card) 30'; Webb (yellow card) 35'	Report	Indra Sahdan Bin Daud 49', 57'; Qiu Li (yellow card) 79'	Stadium: Hougang Stadium; Referee: Sukhbir Singh

==== Quarter finals ====
4 August 2012 Quarter-finals	(Singapore) Home United FC	1–1 (a.e.t.) (2–4 p)	Brunei DPMM FC	Bishan
20:30	Indra Sahdan Bin Daud 48'; Anzité (yellow card) 71'; Nor Azli Yusoff (yellow card) 119'	Report	Tales dos Santos 89'	Stadium: Bishan Stadium; Attendance: 535; Referee: W Ravisanthiran
	Penalties
	Shotaro Ihata (penalty scored); Shi Jiayi (penalty scored); Kenji Arai (penalty missed); Indra Sahdan Daud (penalty missed)		(penalty scored) Ivan Jerković; (penalty scored) Rosmin Kamis; (penalty scored) Azwan Salleh; (penalty missed) Osman Bashiru; (penalty scored) Shahrazen Said

=== AFC Cup ===
==== Group stage ====
Team	Pld	W	D	L	GF	GA	GD	Pts	CHO	HOM	CIT	YAN
(Thailand) Chonburi	6	4	2	0	10	5	+5	14		1–0	2–0	1–0
(Singapore) Home United	6	3	1	2	9	6	+3	10	1–2		3–1	3–1
(Hong Kong) Citizen	6	2	1	3	9	12	−3	7	3–3	1–2		2–1
(Myanmar) Yangon United	6	0	2	4	4	9	−5	2	1–1	0–0	1–2	

Legend: Blue = home team win; Yellow = draw; Red = away team win.

7 March 2012 Group stage	Home United (Singapore)	3–1	(Hong Kong) Citizen	Bishan Stadium, Singapore
19:30 UTC+08:00	Ihata 62'; Mendy 66'; Qiu Li 87'	Report	Nakamura 45+1'	Attendance: 1,023; Referee: Vo Minh Tri (Vietnam)

21 March 2012 Group stage	Chonburi (Thailand)	1–0	(Singapore) Home United	Chonburi Municipality Stadium, Chonburi
19:00 UTC+07:00	Ludovic 69'	Report		Attendance: 5,158; Referee: Jumpei Iida (Japan)

3 April 2012 Group stage	Yangon United (Myanmar)	0–0	(Singapore) Home United	Thuwunna Stadium, Yangon
15:30 UTC+06:30	Yazar Win Thein (yellow card) 56'	Summary	Jeremy Chiang (yellow card) 26'; Lewis (yellow card) 90+4'	Attendance: 4,000; Referee: (Oman) Ibrahim Al Hosni

11 April 2012 Group stage	Home United (Singapore)	3–1	(Myanmar) Yangon United	Bishan Stadium, Singapore
19:30 UTC+08:00	Li 69'; Mendy 75', 80' (yellow card) 90+3'; Sofiyan Abdul Hamid (yellow card) 88'; Jiayi (yellow card) 90+1'	Summary	Aung Thike (yellow card) 30'; Ristic 37'; Khin Maung Lwin (yellow card) 56'; Yazar Win Thein (yellow card) 59'	Attendance: 3,146; Referee: (China) Wang Di

24 April 2012 Group stage	Citizen (Hong Kong)	1–2	(Singapore) Home United	Mong Kok Stadium, Hong Kong
20:00 UTC+08:00	Campion 17'; Sham Kwok Keung (yellow card) 32'	Summary	Mendy 77'; Nor Azli Yusoff (yellow card) 78'; Anzité 90+2'	Attendance: 1,390; Referee: (Chinese Taipei) Yu Ming Hsun

8 May 2012 Group stage	Home United (Singapore)	1–2	(Thailand) Chonburi	Bishan Stadium, Singapore
19:30 UTC+08:00	Sulaiman (yellow card) 42'; Li (yellow card) 45'; Sofiyan Abdul Hamid (yellow card) 47'; Jiayi (yellow card) 84'; Daud 86'	Report	On-Mo 5'; Kachaplayuk 77'	Attendance: 1,393; Referee: (Japan) Hiroyoshi Takayama

==== Knock out Stage ====
22 May 2012 Last 16	Al-Shorta (Iraq)	3–0	Home United (Singapore)	Al Shorta Stadium, Baghdad
19:30 UTC+08:00	Anzité 5' (o.g.); Husain. Abdullah (yellow card) 74'; Oday Jaffal 75'; Muhaimen Salim 82'	Report	Jeremy Chiang (yellow card) 1'; Anzité (yellow card) 80'	Attendance: 250; Referee: (South Korea) Ko Hyung-Jin
