= 2013 Tampines Rovers FC season =

Tampines Rovers
- Chairman: Teo Hock Seng
- Manager: Nenad Bacina
- S.League: –
- AFC Cup: Group stage
Home colours	Away colours

The 2013 Tampines Rovers season saw the team compete in the 2013 S.League. They also competed in the 2013 AFC Cup after winning the 2012 S.League.

== Squad ==
As of 6 January 2017.

=== Sleague ===
No.	Name	Nationality	Date of birth (age)	Previous club
Goalkeepers
1	André Martins	(Portugal)	12 October 1989 (age 36)	(Portugal) Real Massamá
18	Ridhuan Barudin	(Singapore)	23 March 1987 (age 39)	(Singapore) Geylang International
21	Ng Jia Fa	(Singapore)	26 May 1992 (age 34)	(Singapore) Hougang United Prime League
Defenders
2	Ismadi Mukhtar	(Singapore)	16 December 1983 (age 42)	(Singapore) Woodlands Wellington
3	Jufri Taha	(Singapore)	4 March 1985 (age 41)	(Singapore) Balestier Khalsa
4	Fahrudin Mustafic	(Singapore)	17 April 1981 (age 45)	(Indonesia) Persela Lamongan
6	Kunihiro Yamashita	(Japan)	29 May 1986 (age 40)	(Singapore) Albirex Niigata (S)
11	Imran Sahib	(Singapore)	12 October 1982 (age 43)	(Singapore) Woodlands Wellington
12	Anaz Hadee	(Singapore)	24 September 1983 (age 42)	(Singapore) Balestier Khalsa
14	Shaiful Esah	(Singapore)	12 May 1986 (age 40)	(Singapore) LionsXII
16	Seiji Kaneko	(Japan)	27 May 1980 (age 46)	(Japan) Nagoya Grampus
23	Shannon Stephen	(Singapore)	6 February 1994 (age 32)	(Singapore) Young Lions FC
Midfielders
8	Shahdan Sulaiman	(Singapore)	9 May 1988 (age 38)	(Singapore) LionsXII
10	Vítor Ladeiras	(Portugal)	10 April 1992 (age 34)	(Portugal) Real Massamá
13	Ruzaini Zainal	(Singapore) (Malaysia)	17 October 1988 (age 37)	(Singapore) Warriors FC
15	Firdaus Kasman	(Singapore)	24 January 1988 (age 38)	(Singapore) LionsXII
17	Jamil Ali	(Singapore)	2 May 1984 (age 42)	(Singapore) Woodlands Wellington
39	Roysn Yap	(Singapore)	30 January 1993 (age 33)	Youth Team
Forwards
5	Ahmed Fahmie	(Singapore)	20 April 1987 (age 39)	Youth Team
7	Diogo Caramelo	(Portugal)	22 November 1992 (age 33)	(Portugal) Real Massamá
9	Aleksandar Duric	(Singapore) (Australia) (Serbia)	12 August 1970 (age 56)	(Singapore) SAFSA
19	Khairul Amri	(Singapore)	14 March 1985 (age 41)	(Singapore) LionsXII
22	Danial Tan	(Singapore)	4 August 1994 (age 32)	Youth Team
25	Fariq Ghani	(Singapore)	26 August 1993 (age 33)	Youth Team
Players who left club during season
1	Saša Dreven	(Croatia)	27 January 1990 (age 36)	(Croatia) NK Varaždin
10	Sead Hadžibulić	(Serbia)	30 January 1983 (age 43)	(Serbia) FK Hajduk Kula
13	Fazil Zailani	(Singapore)	22 March 1989 (age 37)	(Singapore) Home United Prime League
20	Martín Wagner	(Argentina)	15 June 1985 (age 41)	(Argentina) Defensa y Justicia

== Transfers ==
=== Mid-season transfers ===
==== In ====
Position	Player	Transferred To	Ref
GK	(Portugal) André Martins	(Portugal) Real Massamá	
DF	(Japan) Kunihiro Yamashita	(Japan) Albirex Niigata (S)	
DF	(Singapore) Shaiful Esah	(Singapore) LionsXII	
DF	(Singapore) Shannon Stephen	(Singapore) Young Lions FC	
DF	(Japan) Seiji Kaneko	(Indonesia) PS Mitra Kukar	
MF	(Portugal) Vítor Ladeiras	(Portugal) Real Massamá	
MF	(Singapore) (Malaysia) Ruzaini Zainal	(Singapore) Warriors FC	
MF	(Singapore) Shahdan Sulaiman	(Singapore) LionsXII	
MF	(Singapore) Firdaus Kasman	(Singapore) LionsXII	
FW	(Portugal) Diogo Caramelo	(Portugal) Real Massamá	
FW	(Singapore) Khairul Amri	(Singapore) LionsXII	

==== Out ====
Position	Player	Transferred To	Ref
GK	(Croatia) Saša Dreven	(Croatia) NK Podravina	
GK	(Singapore) Hafez Mawasi	(Singapore)	
GK	(Singapore) Amran Addin	(Singapore)	
GK	(Singapore) Arif Ali	(Singapore)	
DF	(France) Benoît Croissant	Retired	
DF	(Singapore) Ali Hudzaifi	(Singapore) LionsXII	
DF	(Singapore) Syaiful Iskandar	(Singapore) Warriors FC	
MF	(Argentina) Martín Wagner	(Argentina) Argentinos Juniors	
MF	(Singapore) Sazali Salleh	(Singapore) Tanjong Pagar United	
MF	(Singapore) Haziq Azman	(Singapore)	
FW	(Serbia) Sead Hadžibulić	(Serbia) FK Jagodina	
FW	(Singapore) Fazil Zailani		
FW	(Singapore) Ahmad Latiff	(Singapore) Tanjong Pagar United	

== Competitions ==
=== S.League ===
==== League table ====
Pos	Team	Pld	W	D	L	GF	GA	GD	Pts	Qualification
1	Tampines Rovers	27	17	5	5	59	36	+23	56 (Note: Harimau Muda B were awarded a 3–0 victory against Tampines Rovers as the latter were found guilty of fielding an ineligible player. Tampines Rovers had won the original fixture 1–0.)	Qualification to AFC Champions League Qualifying Round 1 or AFC Cup Group Stage
2	Home United	27	16	3	8	42	25	+17	51	Qualification to AFC Cup Group Stage (Note: Qualified as 2013 Singapore Cup winners.)
3	(Japan) Albirex Niigata (S) (Note: The three foreign clubs – Albirex Niigata (S), DPMM FC and Harimau Muda B – as well as the Football Association of Singapore (FAS) under-23 team, Young Lions, are not eligible for any AFC competition spots.)	27	13	7	7	36	28	+8	46	
4	Balestier Khalsa	27	12	7	8	38	28	+10	43	
5	Woodlands Wellington	27	10	7	10	45	47	−2	37	

Source: RSSSF
Rules for classification: 1) points; 2) goal difference; 3) number of goals scored

==== Matches ====
20 February 2013 Match 1	Geylang International	0–5	Tampines Rovers	Bedok Stadium

28 February 2013 Match 2	Tampines Rovers	3–0	Young Lions FC	Clementi Stadium

17 March 2013 Match 3	Tampines Rovers	2–1	Balestier Khalsa	Clementi Stadium

21 March 2013 Match 4	Warriors FC	0–1	Tampines Rovers	Choa Chu Kang Stadium

24 March 2013 Match 5	Tampines Rovers	2–1	Harimau Muda B	Clementi Stadium

29 March 2013 Match 6	Home United	0–1	Tampines Rovers	Bishan Stadium

16 April 2013 Match 7	Tampines Rovers	1–1	DPMM FC	Clementi Stadium

19 April 2013 Match 8	Albirex Niigata (S)	1–2	Tampines Rovers	Bishan Stadium

27 April 2013 Match 9	Tampines Rovers	3–1	Woodlands Wellington	Clementi Stadium

5 May 2013 Match 10	Tanjong Pagar United	1–0	Tampines Rovers	Queenstown Stadium

9 May 2013 Match 11	Tampines Rovers	1–0	Geylang International	Clementi Stadium

12 May 2013 Match 11	Tampines Rovers	3–0	Hougang United	Clementi Stadium

25 May 2013 Match 12	Balestier Khalsa	4–0	Tampines Rovers	Toa Payoh Stadium

28 June 2013 Match 13	Tampines Rovers	1–0	Warriors FC	Clementi Stadium

3 July 2013 Match 14	Harimau Muda B	3–0	Tampines Rovers	Pasir Gudang Stadium

14 July 2013 Match 16	Tampines Rovers	4–1	Home United	Clementi Stadium

18 July 2013 Match 17	Hougang United	2–3	Tampines Rovers	Hougang Stadium

6 August 2013 Match 18	Young Lions FC	2–4	Tampines Rovers	Jalan Besar Stadium

21 August 2013 Match 19	Tampines Rovers	3–3	Albirex Niigata (S)	Clementi Stadium

25 August 2013 Match 20	DPMM FC	2–6	Tampines Rovers	Hassanal Bolkiah National Stadium

21 August 2013 Match 21	Woodlands Wellington	3–3	Tampines Rovers	Woodlands Stadium

20 September 2013 Match 22	Tampines Rovers	3–1	Tanjong Pagar United	Clementi Stadium

Match 23–27	Tampines Rovers	1–3	Albirex Niigata (S)	Clementi Stadium

Match 23–27	Tampines Rovers	1–1	Tanjong Pagar United	Clementi Stadium

Match 23–27	Balestier Khalsa	0–0	Tampines Rovers	Toa Payoh Stadium

Match 23–27	Home United	2–0	Tampines Rovers	Clementi Stadium

Match 23–27	Woodlands Wellington	3–6	Tampines Rovers	Woodlands Stadium

=== Singapore Cup ===
==== Round 1 ====
May 2013	Hougang United	2–1	Tampines Rovers	Hougang Stadium
	Jerome Baker; Mamadou Diallo		Aleksandar Duric

=== Singapore League Cup ===
Pos	Team	Pld	W	D	L	GF	GA	GD	Pts
1	Tanjong Pagar United (A)	2	1	0	1	4	2	+2	3
2	Tampines Rovers (A)	2	1	0	1	4	4	0	3
3	(Singapore) Young Lions FC	2	1	0	1	3	5	−2	3

Updated to match(es) played on 9 June 2013. Source: sleague.com
Rules for classification: 1) points; 2) goal difference; 3) number of goals scored.
(A) Advance to a further round

==== Matches ====
9 June 2013 First Round	Tampines Rovers	2–1	Tanjong Pagar United	Clementi Stadium, Singapore
19:30 (UTC+8)	Aleksandar Đurić 9', 32'	Details	Ismaël Benhamed 90+5'

12 June 2013 First Round	Tampines Rovers	2–3	(Singapore) Young Lions FC	Clementi Stadium, Singapore
19:30 (UTC+8)	Ahmed Fahmie 23'; Jamil Ali 44'	Details	Afiq Yunos 62'; Ignatius Ang 79'; Sahil Suhaimi 90+3'

=== Quarter-finals ===
15 June 2013 Quarter Finals 2	Balestier Khalsa	3–3 (a.e.t.) (4–3 p)	Tampines Rovers	Toa Payoh Stadium
19:30 (UTC+8)	Ismadi Mukhtar 2' (o.g.); Kim Min-Ho 39'; Zulkiffli Hassim 81'	Details	Aleksandar Đurić 8'; Khairul Amri 67'; Jamil Ali 77'	Referee: Abdul Malik

=== AFC Cup ===
Team	Pld	W	D	L	GF	GA	GD	Pts	KEB	SEL	SG	TPR
(India) East Bengal	6	4	2	0	13	6	+7	14		1–0	4–1	2–1
(Malaysia) Selangor	6	2	2	2	12	11	+1	8	2–2		3–1	3–3
(Vietnam) Sài Gòn Xuân Thành	6	2	2	2	9	12	−3	8	0–0	2–1		2–2
(Singapore) Tampines Rovers	6	0	2	4	12	17	−5	2	2–4	2–3	2–3	

Source: RSSSF

6 March 2013	Tampines Rovers (Singapore)	2–3	(Vietnam) Sài Gòn Xuân Thành	Jalan Besar Stadium, Singapore
19:45 UTC+8	Amri 89'; Đurić 90+2'	Report	Amougou 22', 62'; Pham Thua Chi 84'	Attendance: 1,238; Referee: Ng Chiu Kok (Hong Kong)

13 March 2013	Selangor (Malaysia)	3–3	(Singapore) Tampines Rovers	Shah Alam Stadium, Shah Alam
20:45 UTC+8	Doe 8', 54' (pen.); Amri 46'	Report	Đurić 20'; Imran 49'; Yamashita 71'	Attendance: 1,551; Referee: Kim Sang-Woo (Korea Republic)

3 April 2013	Tampines Rovers (Singapore)	2–4	(India) East Bengal	Jalan Besar Stadium, Singapore
19:45 UTC+8	Hadžibulić 28'; Amri 65'	Report	Hadee 19' (o.g.); Barisic 62', 87'; Edeh 64'	Attendance: 1,082; Referee: Chaiya Mahapab (Thailand)

9 April 2013	East Bengal (India)	2–1	(Singapore) Tampines Rovers	Salt Lake Stadium, Kolkata
15:15 UTC+5:30	Edeh 22'; Ralte 86'	Report	Esah 68'	Attendance: 7,000; Referee: Nivon Robesh Gamini (Sri Lanka)

23 April 2013	Sài Gòn Xuân Thành (Vietnam)	2–2	(Singapore) Tampines Rovers	Thống Nhất Stadium, Ho Chi Minh City
18:30 UTC+7	Amougou 18' (pen.); Oloya 42'	Report	Amri 15'; Hadžibulić 63'	Attendance: 2,000; Referee: Wang Di (China PR)

30 April 2013	Tampines Rovers (Singapore)	2–3	(Malaysia) Selangor	Jalan Besar Stadium, Singapore
19:00 UTC+8	Asraruddin 50' (o.g.); Đurić 58'	Report	Taha 28' (o.g.); Amri 45', 76'	Attendance: 839; Referee: Yudai Yamamoto (Japan)
