= 2012 Singapore League Cup =

Tournament details
- Country: Singapore
- Dates: 26 July - 11 August 2012
- Teams: 12

Final positions
- Champions: (Brunei) DPMM FC
- Runners-up: Geylang United

Tournament statistics
- Matches played: 22

The 2012 Singapore League Cup (known as the StarHub League Cup for sponsorship purposes) was held between 26 July to 11 August 2012. Traditionally held as a knockout competition, the 2012 edition saw a new format where four groups of three teams battled it out for a place in the semi-finals. In addition, the four teams that finished third in their respective groups played in a separate Plate Competition consisting of two semi-finals and a final.

The winner of the StarHub League Cup, DPMM FC, walked away with SGD$30,000 in prize money, while the runner up of the competition, Geylang United received SGD$15,000 in prize money. The winner of the Plate competition, Balestier Khalsa, also walked away with SGD$5,000 in prize money.

The draw for the Cup was held on Thursday, 12 July 2012 at the Football Association of Singapore's headquarters in Jalan Besar Stadium, Singapore. While 12 teams from the S.League will playing in the StarHub League Cup, Malaysia’s Harimau Muda A did not be participating in this competition. This was because the Young Tigers had earlier served notice that they were invited for another tournament in Austria scheduled for the same Muslim fasting month period.

StarHub broadcast both semi-finals and the final ‘live’ on its sports channel, SuperSports Arena.

== Preliminary stage ==
Group A: Singapore Armed Forces FC, Tanjong Pagar United FC, DPMM FC

Group B: Albirex Niigata (S), Balestier Khalsa FC, Geylang United FC

Group C: Home United FC, Young Lions FC, Hougang United FC

Group D: Tampines Rovers FC, Woodlands Wellington FC, Gombak United FC

Key to colours in group tables
Group winners and runners-up advance to the quarter-finals of the 2012 StarHub League Cup.
Third-placed teams enter the semi-finals of the 2012 Plate Competition.

=== Group A ===
Pos	Team	Pld	W	D	L	GF	GA	GD	Pts
1	Singapore Armed Forces FC (A)	2	2	0	0	5	0	+5	6
2	(Brunei) DPMM FC (A)	2	1	0	1	1	2	−1	3
3	Tanjong Pagar United	2	0	0	2	0	4	−4	0

Updated to match(es) played on 1 August 2012. Source: sleague.com
Rules for classification: 1) points; 2) goal difference; 3) number of goals scored.
(A) Advance to a further round
26 July 2012
20:30

SAFFC	3 – 0	Tanjong Pagar United
Aliff Shafaein 64'; Aliff Shafaein 75'; Marin Jonjić 89'	Preview; Details; Report

Choa Chu Kang Stadium
Attendance: 423
Referee: Leow Thiam Hoe

29 July 2012
20:30

Tanjong Pagar United	0 – 1	(Brunei) DPMM FC
	Preview; Details; Report	7' Subhi Abdilah

Queenstown Stadium
Attendance: 166
Referee: P Jeevanathan

1 August 2012
20:30

DPMM FC (Brunei)	0 - 2	SAFFC
	Preview; Details; Report	29' Fazrul Nawaz; 93' Aliff Shafaein

Yishun Stadium
Referee: Abdul Malik

=== Group B ===
Pos	Team	Pld	W	D	L	GF	GA	GD	Pts
1	Geylang United (A)	2	2	0	0	5	1	+4	6
2	(Japan) Albirex Niigata (S) (A)	2	1	0	1	2	2	0	3
3	Balestier Khalsa	2	0	0	2	1	5	−4	0

Updated to match(es) played on 2 August 2012. Source: sleague.com
Rules for classification: 1) points; 2) goal difference; 3) number of goals scored.
(A) Advance to a further round
27 July 2012
20:30

Albirex Niigata (S) (Japan)	2 – 0	Balestier Khalsa
Yasuhiro Yamakoshi 49'; Yasuhiro Yamakoshi 80'	Preview; Details; Report

Jurong East Stadium
Referee: W Ravisanthiran

30 July 2012
20:30

Balestier Khalsa	1 – 3	Geylang United
Kim Min-ho 25'	Preview; Details; Report	18' Jozef Kapláň; 41' Nurhazwan Noraskin; 64' Michael King

Toa Payoh Stadium
Referee: K Kalimuthu

2 August 2012
20:30

Geylang United	2-0	(Japan) Albirex Niigata (S)
Stefan Milojević 43'; Shah Hirul 54'	Preview; Details; Report

Bedok Stadium
Attendance: 400
Referee: Muhd Taqi

=== Group C ===
Pos	Team	Pld	W	D	L	GF	GA	GD	Pts
1	Home United (A)	2	2	0	0	3	0	+3	6
2	Hougang United (A)	2	1	0	1	2	3	−1	3
3	(Singapore) Young Lions	2	0	0	2	1	3	−2	0

Updated to match(es) played on 1 August 2012. Source: sleague.com
Rules for classification: 1) points; 2) goal difference; 3) number of goals scored.
(A) Advance to a further round
26 July 2012
20:30

Home United	1 – 0	(Singapore) Courts Young Lions
Firdaus Idros 6'	Preview; Details; Report

Bishan Stadium
Referee: Abdul Malik

29 July 2012
20:30

Courts Young Lions (Singapore)	1 – 2	Hougang United
Hafiz Sujad 90'	Preview; Details; Report	6' Mamadou Diallo; 84' Azhar Sairudin

Jalan Besar Stadium
Referee: Muhd Taqi

1 August 2012
20:30

Hougang United	0 - 2	Home United
	Preview; Details; Report	49' Indra Sahdan Daud; 57' Indra Sahdan Daud

Hougang Stadium
Referee: Sukhbir Singh

=== Group D ===
Pos	Team	Pld	W	D	L	GF	GA	GD	Pts
1	Tampines Rovers (A)	2	1	1	0	4	2	+2	4
2	Gombak United (A)	2	0	2	0	2	2	0	2
3	Woodlands Wellington	2	0	1	1	2	4	−2	1

Updated to match(es) played on 2 August 2012. Source: sleague.com
Rules for classification: 1) points; 2) goal difference; 3) number of goals scored.
(A) Advance to a further round
27 July 2012
20:30

Tampines Rovers	3 – 1	Woodlands Wellington
Jamil Ali 51'; Aleksandar Đurić 55'; Aleksandar Đurić 68'	Preview; Details; Report	66' Aloysius Yap

Clementi Stadium
Attendance: 372
Referee: Ahmad A'Qashah

30 July 2012
20:30

Woodlands Wellington	1 – 1	Gombak United
Daniel Hammond 25'	Preview; Details; Report	22' Walid Lounis

Woodlands Stadium
Attendance: 205
Referee: W Ravisanthiran

2 August 2012
20:30

Gombak United	1-1	Tampines Rovers
Julien Durand 14'	Preview; Details; Report	64' Ismail Yunos (o.g)

Jurong West Stadium
Referee: Yazeen Buhari

== Knockout stage ==
Quarterfinals
A1	SAFFC	1
C2	Hougang United	0
C1	Home United	1(2)
A2	(Brunei) DPMM FC (P)	1(4)
B1	Geylang United	1
D2	Gombak United	0
D1	Tampines Rovers	3(6)
B2	(Japan) Albirex Niigata (S)	3(5)

Semifinals
QF1	SAFFC	0
QF2	(Brunei) DPMM FC	2
QF3	Geylang United	2
QF4	Tampines Rovers	0

Finals
SF1	(Brunei) DPMM FC	2
SF2	Geylang United	0

== Quarterfinals ==
4 August 2012
20:30

Singapore Armed Forces	1-0	Hougang United
Shimpei Sakurada 90'	Preview; Details; Report

Choa Chu Kang Stadium
Attendance: 550
Referee: K Kalimuthu

4 August 2012
20:30

Home United	1-1 (a.e.t.)	(Brunei) DPMM FC
Indra Sahdan Daud 48'	Preview; Details; Report	90' Tales dos Santos
Penalties
Shotaro Ihata (penalty scored); Shi Jiayi (penalty scored); Kenji Arai (penalty missed); Indra Sahdan Daud (penalty missed)	2 – 4	(penalty scored) Ivan Jerković; (penalty scored) Rosmin Kamis; (penalty scored) Azwan Salleh; (penalty missed) Osman Bashiru; (penalty scored) Shahrazen Said

Bishan Stadium
Attendance: 535
Referee: W Ravisanthiran

5 August 2012
20:30

Geylang United	1-0	Gombak United
Mun Seung-Man 75'	Preview; Details; Report

Bedok Stadium
Attendance: 666
Referee: Ahmad A'Qashah

5 August 2012
20:30

Tampines Rovers	3-3 (a.e.t.)	(Japan) Albirex Niigata (S)
Sead Hadžibulić 39'; Gligor Gligorov 73'; Ahmad Latiff Khamaruddin 119'	Preview; Details; Report	37' Sho Kamimura; 66' Sho Kamimura; 96' Atsushi Shimono
Penalties
Noh Alam Shah (penalty scored); Gligor Gligorov (penalty scored); Sead Hadžibulić (penalty scored); Ahmed Fahmie (penalty scored); Aleksandar Đurić (penalty scored); Saša Dreven (penalty scored)	6 – 5	(penalty scored) Yasuhiro Yamakoshi; (penalty scored) Sho Kamimura; (penalty scored) Takeshi Ito; (penalty scored) Shuhei Hotta; (penalty scored) Norihiro Kawakami; (penalty missed) Hidekazu Yamamoto

Clementi Stadium
Attendance: 532
Referee: Abdul Malik

== Semifinals ==
7 August 2012
20:45

Singapore Armed Forces	0-2	(Brunei) DPMM FC
	Preview; Details; Report	10' Tales dos Santos; 80' Adi Said

Jalan Besar Stadium
Attendance: 750
Referee: Abdul Malik

8 August 2012
20:45

Geylang United	2-0	Tampines Rovers
Jozef Kapláň 45'; Stefan Milojević 83'	Preview; Details; Report

Jalan Besar Stadium
Attendance: 680
Referee: Leow Thiam Hoe

== Final ==
11 August 2012
20:45

DPMM FC (Brunei)	2-0	Geylang United
Shahrazen Said 36'; Azwan Salleh 76'	Preview; Details; Report

Jalan Besar Stadium
Attendance: 1,874

== Plate Competition ==
The Plate competition will be made up of the four teams that finish third in their respective groups. Balestier Khalsa became the winners of the inaugural Plate Competition when they beat the Young Lions FC by a single goal scored in the dying minutes of the plate final by Prime League striker, Kim Min-ho.

== Plate Knockout stage ==
Semifinals
A3	Tanjong Pagar	1
C3	(Singapore) Courts Young Lions	2
B3	Balestier Khalsa	1
D3	Woodlands Wellington	0

Finals
SF1	(Singapore) Courts Young Lions	0
SF2	Balestier Khalsa	1

== Plate Semi-finals ==
6 August 2012
20:30

Tanjong Pagar United	1-2	(Singapore) Courts Young Lions
Hafiz Osman 8'	Preview; Details; Report	54' Faritz Abdul Hameed; 55' Benjamin Kristoffersen Lee

Queenstown Stadium
Referee: Sukhbir Singh

6 August 2012
20:30

Balestier Khalsa	1-0	Woodlands Wellington
Zulkiffli Hassim 67'	Preview; Details; Report

Toa Payoh Stadium
Referee: Muhd Taqi

== Plate final ==
10 August 2012
20:30

Courts Young Lions (Singapore)	0-1	Balestier Khalsa
	Preview; Details	90' Kim Min-ho

Jalan Besar Stadium
Attendance: 1,234
Referee: K Kalimuthu

== See also ==
- S.League
- Singapore Cup
- Singapore Charity Shield
- Football Association of Singapore
- List of football clubs in Singapore
