= Piskor =

Piskor is a surname. Notable people with the name include:

- Davor Piškor (born 1982), Croatian footballer
- Ed Piskor (1982–2024), American comics artist
- Michal Piskoř, (born 1967) Czech ice hockey player
- Pierre Piskor (born 1984), French footballer
- Roman Piskor (1917–1981), American football tackle
- Tadeusz Piskor (1889–1951), Polish Army general
