= 2012 Singapore Cup =

Tournament details
- Country: Singapore
- Dates: May 2012 – October 2012
- Teams: 16

Final positions
- Champions: SAFFC
- Runners-up: Tampines Rovers

Tournament statistics
- Matches played: 12
- Goals scored: 35 (2.92 per match)

The 2012 Singapore Cup (known as the RHB Singapore Cup for sponsorship reasons) started in May 2012. It was the 15th staging of the annual Singapore Cup tournament.

11 S.League clubs and four invited foreign teams play in this edition. The cup was a single-elimination tournament, with all sixteen teams playing from the first round. The first round involved one-off matches. Subsequent rounds involved ties of two legs.

The Courts Young Lions and Malaysia's Harimau Muda, both of whom are Great Eastern-YEO'S S.League participant teams, have requested and received permission to sit out of the RHB Singapore Cup, due to their respective preparations for the AFC Under-22 Asian Cup qualifiers in June.

The first round kicked off on 14 May 2012. The quarter-finals were held from 2 to 9 July 2012. The finals were held at Jalan Besar Stadium on 28 October 2012.

The cup winner qualified for the 2013 AFC Cup.

== Teams ==
S.League Clubs

- (Japan) Albirex Niigata (S)
- Balestier Khalsa
- (Brunei) DPMM FC
- Geylang United
- Gombak United
- Home United
- Hougang United
- Singapore Armed Forces (SAFFC)
- Tampines Rovers
- Tanjong Pagar United
- Woodlands Wellington

Invited Foreign Teams

- (Cambodia) Phnom Penh Crown
- (Laos) Yotha FC
- (Malaysia) Harimau Muda B
- (Myanmar) Kanbawza FC
- (Philippines) Loyola Meralco Sparks

== Knockout bracket ==
Round of 16
(Brunei) DPMM FC	0
Home United	1
SAFFC	1 (6)
Balestier Khalsa	1 (5)
Gombak United	3
(Malaysia) Harimau Muda B	0
Tanjong Pagar United	1 (3)
Hougang United	1 (4)
(Laos) Yotha FC	0
(Japan) Albirex Niigata (S)	1
(Cambodia) Phnom Penh Crown	3
Tampines Rovers	4
(Philippines) Loyola Meralco Sparks	2
Geylang United	1
(Myanmar) Kanbawza FC	2
Woodlands Wellington	1

Quarter-finals
Home United	1	3	4
SAFFC	2	3	5
Gombak United	1	2	3
Hougang United	2	0	2
(Japan) Albirex Niigata (S)	1	0	1
Tampines Rovers	2	2	4
(Philippines) Loyola Meralco Sparks	3	2	5
(Myanmar) Kanbawza FC	1	2	3

Semi-finals
SAFFC	1	1	2
Gombak United	0	0	0
Tampines Rovers	2	3	5
(Philippines) Loyola Meralco Sparks	0	0	0

Final
SAFFC	2
Tampines Rovers	1

== Preliminary round ==
All times are Singapore Standard Time (SST) – UTC+8.

14 May 2012
19:45

SAFFC	1–1	Balestier Khalsa
Karoglan 47'	Report	Kim Min-Ho 88'
Penalties
Karoglan (penalty scored); Inui (penalty scored); Sakurada (penalty scored); Zailan (penalty scored); Zulfadli (penalty scored); Fazrul (penalty scored)	6–5	Tengku Mushadad (penalty scored); Cunningham (penalty scored); Kim Min-Ho (penalty scored); Yusiskandar Yusop (penalty scored); Park Kang-Jin (penalty scored); Syed Thaha (penalty missed)

Choa Chu Kang Stadium
Attendance: 936
Referee: Sukhbir Singh

16 May 2012
19:45

Tampines Rovers	4–3	(Cambodia) Phnom Penh Crown
Đurić 42', 63'; Jamil 45+1'; Imran 45+3'	Report	Borey 15'; Sokumpheak 57', 59'

Clementi Stadium
Attendance: 487
Referee: W. Ravisanthiran

17 May 2012
19:45

DPMM FC (Brunei)	0–1	Home United
	Report	Wilkinson 40'

Yishun Stadium
Attendance: 825
Referee: Sukhbir Singh

18 May 2012
19:45

Loyola Meralco Sparks (Philippines)	2–1 (a.e.t.)	Geylang United
M. A. Hartmann 64'; Park Min-Ho 95'	Report	King 43'

Jalan Besar Stadium
Attendance: 1,044
Referee: Leow Thiam Hoe

19 May 2012
19:45

Kanbawza FC (Myanmar)	2–1	Woodlands Wellington
Soe Min Oo 3'; Tércio Nunes 61' (pen.)	Report	Moon Soon-Ho 65' (pen.)

Jalan Besar Stadium
Attendance: 1,560
Referee: Muhd Taqi

20 May 2012
19:45

Gombak United	3–0	(Malaysia) Harimau Muda B
Anderson 11'; Fairoz 53'; K. Vikraman 81'	Report

Jurong West Stadium
Attendance: 960
Referee: Ahmad A'Qashah

20 May 2012
19:45

Tanjong Pagar United	1–1 (a.e.t.)	Hougang United
Hafiz 70'	Report	Diallo 55'
Penalties
Kawanabe (penalty scored); Hafiz (penalty scored); Xu (penalty missed); Asraf (penalty scored); Jang In-Jun (penalty missed)	3–4	Barać (penalty scored); Ang (penalty missed); Fazly (penalty scored); Diallo (penalty scored); Vidaković (penalty scored)

Queenstown Stadium
Attendance: 481
Referee: W. Ravisanthiran

26 May 2012
19:45

Albirex Niigata (Japan)	1–0	(Laos) Yotha FC
Sato 75'	Report

Jurong East Stadium
Attendance: 721
Referee: Leow Thiam Hoe

== Quarter-finals ==
All times are Singapore Standard Time (SST) – UTC+8.

=== First leg ===
2 July 2012
19:45

Albirex Niigata (Japan)	1–2	Tampines Rovers
Yamakoshi 22'	Report	Taha 50'; Latiff 79'

Jurong East Stadium
Attendance: 742
Referee: K Kalimuthu

3 July 2012
19:45

Gombak United	1–2	Hougang United
Durand 7'	Report	Webb 47'; Barać 51'

Jurong West Stadium
Referee: Ahmad A'Qashah

4 July 2012
19:45

Home United	1–2	SAFFC
Shi Jiayi 45+2'	Report	Inui 38'; Rosman 50' (o.g.)

Bishan Stadium
Attendance: 1,045
Referee: Yazeen Buhari

5 July 2012
19:45

Loyola Meralco Sparks (Philippines)	3–1	(Myanmar) Kanbawza FC
P. Younghusband 15'; M. A. Hartmann 66'; J. Younghusband 90+3'	Report	Soe Min Oo 75'

Jalan Besar Stadium
Attendance: 2,784
Referee: Leow Thiam Hoe

=== Second leg ===
6 July 2012
19:45

Tampines Rovers	2–0	(Japan) Albirex Niigata (S)
Hadžibulić 16'; Jamil Ali 60'	Report

Clementi Stadium
Referee: Abdul Malik

7 July 2012
19:45

Hougang United	0–2	Gombak United
	Report	Durand 67'; Hafiz Rahim 89'

Hougang Stadium
Referee: W Ravisanthiran

8 July 2012
19:45

Kanbawza FC (Myanmar)	2–2	(Philippines) Loyola Meralco Sparks
Hanson 60'; Khiang 90+4'	Report	J. Younghusband 24'; Morallo 38'

Jalan Besar Stadium
Attendance: 3,933
Referee: Abdul Malik

9 July 2012
19:45

SAFFC	3–3	Home United
Sakurada 14'; Karoglan 52'; Tatsuro 82'	Report	Mendy 15', 70'; Anzite-Touadere 43'

Choa Chu Kang Stadium
Referee: Muhd Taqi

== Semi-finals ==
All times are Singapore Standard Time (SST) – UTC+8.

=== First leg ===
3 October 2012
19:45

SAFFC	1–0	Gombak United
Inui 36' (pen.)	Report

Choa Chu Kang Stadium

4 October 2012
19:45

Tampines Rovers	2–0	(Philippines) Loyola Meralco Sparks
Đurić 29'; Latiff 50'	Report

Clementi Stadium

=== Second leg ===
6 October 2012
19:45

Gombak United	0–1	SAFFC
	Report	Karoglan 79' (pen.)

Jurong West Stadium

7 October 2012
19:45

Loyola Meralco Sparks (Philippines)	0–3	Tampines Rovers
	Preview; Details; Report	Đurić 78', 84'; Sahib 90+5'

Jalan Besar Stadium
Referee: Yazeen Buhari

== Third-place Playoff ==
All times are Singapore Standard Time (SST) – UTC+8.

28 October 2012
17:15

Gombak United	4–0	(Philippines) Loyola Meralco Sparks
Hussain 7'; Manzur 11'; Hasan 35'; Durand 43'	Preview; Details

Jalan Besar Stadium
Referee: Leow Thiam Hoe

== Final ==
All times are Singapore Standard Time (SST) – UTC+8.

28 October 2012
19:45

SAFFC	2–1	Tampines Rovers
Sakurada 78'; Gunawan 90+2'	Preview; Details	Jantan 25' (o.g.)

Jalan Besar Stadium
Referee: Muhd Taqi
