= Takeshi Ito =

Takeshi Ito may refer to:

- Takeshi Ito (activist) (1929–2000), Japanese economist and peace activist
- Takeshi Ito (footballer) (born 1987), Japanese footballer
