= 2009–10 Burnley F.C. season =

English football club season

Burnley
2009–10 season
- Chairman: Barry Kilby
- Manager: Owen Coyle (until 5 January); Brian Laws
- Premier League: 18th
- FA Cup: Fourth round
- League Cup: Third round
- Top goalscorer: League: Steven Fletcher (8); All: Steven Fletcher (12)
- Highest home attendance: 21,761 (vs. Bolton Wanderers)
- Lowest home attendance: 18,397 (vs. Fulham)
- Average home league attendance: 20,654

The 2009–10 season marked Burnley's first season in the Premier League and the end of the club's 33-year absence from the top flight of English football.

Burnley became the first newly promoted club to chalk up four successive home victories at the start of a Premier League season. The club ended the season in 18th position, however, and were relegated back to the Championship.

In June 2009 manager Owen Coyle signed a contract extension to remain at the club until the end of the 2012–13 season, but left in January to manage Bolton Wanderers. Eight days later Brian Laws was named as his replacement.

== Team kit ==
The team kits for the 2009–10 season are produced by Erreà and the shirt sponsor is Cooke Oils. Both the home and away kits have been designed to replicate those worn by the Burnley team of 1960, when they were last crowned the champions of English football 50 years ago. The traditional V-neck claret and blue home jersey features the 50th anniversary logo, is embroidered with the club crest worn in that era and is finished with a claret and blue trim on the neck and sleeves and accompanied by plain white shorts and claret and blue hooped stockings identical to those worn by The Clarets when they won the First Division title. The away jersey is a white shirt with claret and blue trim on the V-neck and sleeves with black shorts and white stockings with claret and blue trim.

Home	Away

== First-team squad ==
As of 27 January 2010.

=== Current squad ===
Note: Flags indicate national team as defined under FIFA eligibility rules; some limited exceptions apply. Players may hold more than one non-FIFA nationality.

No.	Pos.	Nation	Player
1	GK	PER	Diego Penny
2	DF	SCO	Graham Alexander (vice-captain)
4	DF	NIR	Michael Duff
5	DF	ENG	Clarke Carlisle
6	DF	SCO	Steven Caldwell (captain)
7	MF	SCO	Kevin McDonald
9	FW	SCO	Steven Fletcher
10	FW	NIR	Martin Paterson
11	MF	ENG	Wade Elliott
12	GK	DEN	Brian Jensen
14	DF	ENG	Tyrone Mears
15	DF	CAN	David Edgar
16	MF	IRL	Chris McCann
17	DF	ENG	Richard Eckersley
19	FW	ENG	Jay Rodriguez (on loan to Barnsley)
20	FW	ENG	Robbie Blake
21	DF	CMR	André Bikey
22	FW	ENG	David Nugent (on loan from Portsmouth)

No.	Pos.	Nation	Player
23	DF	ENG	Stephen Jordan
24	DF	SCO	Brian Easton (on loan to Hamilton Academical)
25	MF	ENG	Adam Kay
27	MF	SCO	Alex MacDonald
28	DF	IRL	Kevin Long
29	FW	FRA	Frédéric Nimani
30	FW	SCO	Steven Thompson
31	GK	ENG	Nicky Weaver
33	MF	ENG	Chris Eagles
34	DF	SCO	Danny Fox
35	DF	ENG	Chris Lynch
36	DF	ENG	Nik Kudiersky
37	MF	ENG	Chris Anderson
38	MF	ENG	Alex-Ray Harvey
39	FW	ENG	Wes Fletcher (on loan to Grimsby Town)
40	DF	ENG	Ben Hoskin
42	MF	ENG	Jack Cork (on loan from Chelsea)

== Transfers ==
=== In ===
#	Pos	Player	From	Fee	Date
14	DF	(England) Tyrone Mears	(England) Derby County	£500,000	30 June 2009
9	FW	(Scotland) Steven Fletcher	(Scotland) Hibernian	£3,000,000	30 June 2009
15	DF	(Canada) David Edgar	(England) Newcastle United	Tribunal	1 July 2009
24	DF	(Scotland) Brian Easton	(Scotland) Hamilton Academical	£350,000	14 July 2009
17	DF	(England) Richard Eckersley	(England) Manchester United	Compensation	15 July 2009
32	MF	(Ecuador) Fernando Guerrero	(Ecuador) Independiente del Valle	Season-long loan	6 August 2009
21	DF	(Cameroon) André Bikey	(England) Reading	Undisclosed	18 August 2009
22	FW	(England) David Nugent	(England) Portsmouth	Six month loan	1 September 2009
41	GK	(England) Jonathan Lund	(England) Grimsby Town	Free	7 October 2009
28	DF	(Republic of Ireland) Kevin Long	(Republic of Ireland) Cork City	Undisclosed	26 November 2009 (officially joined club in January)
29	FW	(France) Frédéric Nimani	(France) AS Monaco	Five-month loan	22 January 2010
31	GK	(England) Nicky Weaver	(Scotland) Dundee United	Free	27 January 2010
18	DF	(England) Leon Cort	(England) Stoke City	£1,500,000	27 January 2010
34	DF	(Scotland) Danny Fox	(Scotland) Celtic	Undisclosed	29 January 2010
22	FW	(England) David Nugent	(England) Portsmouth	End of season loan	1 February 2010
42	MF	(England) Jack Cork	(England) Chelsea	End of season loan	1 February 2010

=== Out ===
#	Pos	Player	To	Fee	Date
	MF	(Northern Ireland) Steve Jones	(England) Walsall	Released	1 June 2009
	GK	(Hungary) Gábor Király	(Germany) 1860 München	Released	1 June 2009
	MF	(Republic of Ireland) Alan Mahon	(England) Tranmere Rovers	Released	1 June 2009
27	MF	(Scotland) Alex MacDonald	(Scotland) Falikirk	Loan	10 July 2009
22	FW	(Albania) Besart Berisha	(Germany) Arminia Bielefeld	£75,000	5 August 2009
25	MF	(England) Adam Kay	(England) Chester City	Loan	21 August 2009
35	DF	(England) Chris Lynch	(England) Chester City	Loan	21 August 2009
26	MF	(Netherlands) Remco van der Schaaf	(Denmark) Brøndby	18-month Loan	18 January 2010
39	FW	(England) Wes Fletcher	(England) Grimsby Town	Loan	18 January 2010

== Coaching staff ==
Position	Name	Nationality
Manager:	Brian Laws	(England) English
Assistant manager:	Russ Wilcox	(England) English
First-team coach:	Stuart Gray	(England) English
Youth team coach:	Terry Pashley	(England) English
Chief scout:	Tim Henderson	(England) English
Goalkeeping coach:	Billy Mercer	(England) English
Fitness coach:	Tom Little	(England) English

== Statistics ==
=== Appearances and goals ===
Numbers in parentheses denote appearances as substitute.
Players with names struck through and marked † left the club during the playing season.
Players with names in italics and marked * were on loan from another club with Burnley.
Key to positions: GK – Goalkeeper; DF – Defender; MF – Midfielder; FW – Forward

No.	Pos.	Nat.	Name	League		FA Cup		League Cup		Total		Discipline	
No.	Pos.	Nat.	Name	Apps	Goals	Apps	Goals	Apps	Goals	Apps	Goals	A yellow rectangle, denoting the yellow penalty card shown to a player being cautioned	A red rectangle, denoting the red penalty card shown to a player being sent off
1	GK	PER	Diego Penny	0 (1)	0	0	0	1 (1)	0	1 (2)	0	0	0
2	MF	SCO	Graham Alexander	33	7	2	1	0	0	35	8	3	0
3	DF	NOR	~~Christian Kalvenes~~ †	3 (3)	0	1	0	1	0	5 (3)	0	0	0
4	DF	NIR	Michael Duff	10 (1)	0	2	0	0 (1)	0	12 (2)	0	4	0
5	DF	ENG	Clarke Carlisle	27	0	0	0	1	0	28	0	7	0
6	DF	SCO	Steven Caldwell	12 (1)	1	0	0	0	0	12 (1)	1	1	1
7	MF	SCO	Kevin McDonald	15 (11)	1	2	0	2	0	19 (11)	1	5	0
8	MF	ISL	Joey Guðjónsson	1 (9)	0	1 (1)	0	2	0	4 (10)	0	1	0
9	FW	SCO	Steven Fletcher	35	8	1	1	1 (1)	3	37 (1)	12	1	0
10	FW	NIR	Martin Paterson	17 (6)	4	0 (1)	0	1 (1)	0	18 (8)	4	2	0
11	MF	ENG	Wade Elliott	34 (4)	4	2	0	0	0	36 (4)	4	5	0
12	GK	DEN	Brian Jensen	38	0	2	0	1	0	41	0	3	0
14	DF	JAM	Tyrone Mears	38	0	1	0	0	0	39	0	7	0
15	DF	CAN	David Edgar	2 (2)	0	1	0	1	0	4 (2)	0	0	0
16	MF	IRL	Chris McCann	7	0	1	0	0	0	8	0	1	0
17	MF	ENG	Richard Eckersley	0	0	1	0	2	0	3	0	2	1
18	DF	GUY	Leon Cort	15	0	0	0	0	0	15	0	0	0
19	FW	ENG	Jay Rodriguez	0	0	0	0	1 (1)	0	1 (1)	0	1	0
20	MF	ENG	Robbie Blake	20 (11)	2	1 (1)	0	0 (1)	0	21 (13)	2	1	0
21	DF	CMR	André Bikey	26 (2)	1	1	0	2	0	29 (2)	1	5	0
22	FW	ENG	David Nugent *	20 (10)	6	0	0	0	0	20 (10)	6	0	0
23	DF	ENG	Stephen Jordan	23 (2)	0	0	0	0	0	23 (2)	0	3	1
24	DF	SCO	Brian Easton	0	0	0	0	1	0	1	0	1	0
25	MF	ENG	Adam Kay	0	0	0	0	0	0	0	0	0	0
26	MF	NED	Remco van der Schaaf	0	0	0	0	0	0	0	0	0	0
27	MF	SCO	Alex MacDonald	0	0	0	0	0	0	0	0	0	0
28	DF	IRL	Kevin Long	0	0	0	0	0	0	0	0	0	0
29	FW	FRA	Frédéric Nimani *	0 (2)	0	0	0	0	0	0 (2)	0	1	0
30	FW	SCO	Steven Thompson	1 (19)	4	1 (1)	0	1	0	3 (20)	4	0	0
31	GK	ENG	Nicky Weaver	0	0	0	0	0	0	0	0	0	0
32	MF	ECU	~~Fernando Guerrero~~ * †	0 (7)	0	0	0	2	0	2 (7)	0	0	0
33	MF	ENG	Chris Eagles	20 (14)	2	2	0	2	1	24 (14)	3	3	0
34	DF	SCO	Danny Fox	13 (1)	1	0	0	0	0	13 (1)	1	3	0
35	DF	ENG	Chris Lynch	0	0	0	0	0	0	0	0	0	0
35	DF	ENG	Nik Kudiersky	0	0	0	0	0	0	0	0	0	0
37	MF	ENG	Chris Anderson	0	0	0	0	0	0	0	0	0	0
38	MF	ENG	Alex-Ray Harvey	0	0	0	0	0	0	0	0	0	0
39	FW	ENG	Wes Fletcher	0	0	0	0	0	0	0	0	0	0
40	FW	ENG	Ben Hoskin	0	0	0	0	0	0	0	0	0	0
41	GK	ENG	Jonathan Lund	0	0	0	0	0	0	0	0	0	0
42	MF	ENG	Jack Cork *	8 (3)	1	0	0	0	0	8 (3)	1	0	0

== Match details ==
=== Premier League ===
Premier League match details
Date	League position	Opponents	Venue	Result	Score F–A	Scorers	Attendance	Ref
15 August 2009	16th	Stoke City	A	L	0–2		27,385 (2,888 away)	
19 August 2009	12th	Manchester United	H	W	1–0	Blake 19'	20,872 (2,490 away)	
23 August 2009	7th	Everton	H	W	1–0	Elliott 34'	19,984 (2,383 away)	
29 August 2009	9th	Chelsea	A	L	0–3		40,906 (1,036 away)	
12 September 2009	11th	Liverpool	A	L	0–4		43,817 (2,998 away)	
19 September 2009	9th	Sunderland	H	W	3–1	Alexander 13' pen., Nugent (2) 67', 86'	20,196 (2,208 away)	
26 September 2009	11th	Tottenham Hotspur	A	L	0–5		35,462 (1,156 away)	
3 October 2009	9th	Birmingham City	H	W	2–1	Fletcher 53', Bikey 62'	20,102 (1,047 away)	
18 October 2009	10th	Blackburn Rovers	A	L	2–3	Blake 5', Eagles 90'	26,689 (2,800 away)	
24 October 2009	11th	Wigan Athletic	H	L	1–3	Fletcher 4'	19,430 (965 away)	
31 October 2009	10th	Hull City	H	W	2–0	Alexander (2) 20' pen., 77'	20,219 (1,977 away)	
7 November 2009	10th	Manchester City	A	D	3–3	Alexander 19' pen., Fletcher 32', McDonald 87'	47,205 (2,828 away)	
21 November 2009	9th	Aston Villa	H	D	1–1	Caldwell 9'	21,178 (2,344 away)	
28 November 2009	11th	West Ham United	A	L	3–5	Fletcher (2) 68', 74', Eagles 90'	34,003 (1,889 away)	
5 December 2009	13th	Portsmouth	A	L	0–2		17,822 (1,222 away)	
12 December 2009	13th	Fulham	H	D	1–1	Elliott 60'	18,397 (304 away)	
16 December 2009	13th	Arsenal	H	D	1–1	Alexander 28' pen.	21,309 (1,839 away)	
20 December 2009	14th	Wolverhampton Wanderers	A	L	0–2		27,410 (1,296 away)	
26 December 2009	13th	Bolton Wanderers	H	D	1–1	Nugent 56'	21,761 (2,357 away)	
28 December 2009	14th	Everton	A	L	0–2		39,419 (2,888 away)	
16 January 2010	15th	Manchester United	A	L	0–3		75,120 (3,010 away)	
26 January 2010	18th	Bolton Wanderers	A	L	0–1		23,986 (4,654 away)	
30 January 2010	18th	Chelsea	H	L	1–2	Fletcher 50'	21,131 (2,130 away)	
6 February 2010	15th	West Ham United	H	W	2–1	Nugent 14', Fox 55'	21,001 (2,286 away)	
9 February 2010	16th	Fulham	A	L	0–3		23,005 (1,105 away)	
21 February 2010	19th	Aston Villa	A	L	2–5	Fletcher 10', Paterson 90'	38,709 (1,191 away)	
27 February 2010	19th	Portsmouth	H	L	1–2	Paterson 31'	19,714 (839 away)	
6 March 2010	19th	Arsenal	A	L	1–3	Nugent 50'	60,043 (1,452 away)	
10 March 2010	18th	Stoke City	H	D	1–1	Nugent 52'	20,323 (1,743 away)	
13 March 2010	18th	Wolverhampton Wanderers	H	L	1–2	Thompson 73'	21,217 (2,300 away)	
20 March 2010	18th	Wigan Athletic	A	L	0–1		18,498	
28 March 2010	19th	Blackburn Rovers	H	L	0–1		21,546 (2,375 away)	
3 April 2010	19th	Manchester City	H	L	1–6	Fletcher 72'	21,330 (2,356 away)	
10 April 2010	18th	Hull City	A	W	4–1	Paterson 35', Alexander (2) 64' pen., 70' pen., Elliott 90'	24,369	
17 April 2010	19th	Sunderland	A	L	1–2	Thompson 82'	41,341	
25 April 2010	19th	Liverpool	H	L	0–4		21,553 (2,219 away)	
1 May 2010	19th	Birmingham City	A	L	1–2	Thompson 87'	24,578	
9 May 2010	18th	Tottenham Hotspur	H	W	4–2	Elliott 42', Cork 54', Paterson 71', Thompson 88'	21,161 (2,400 away)	

=== Final league table ===
Pos	Team	Pld	W	D	L	GF	GA	GD	Pts	Qualification or relegation
16	Wigan Athletic	38	9	9	20	37	79	−42	36	
17	West Ham United	38	8	11	19	47	66	−19	35	
18	Burnley (R)	38	8	6	24	42	82	−40	30	Relegation to Football League Championship
19	Hull City (R)	38	6	12	20	34	75	−41	30	Relegation to Football League Championship
20	Portsmouth (R)	38	7	7	24	34	66	−32	19 (Note: Portsmouth were docked nine points for entering administration.)	Relegation to Football League Championship

Source: Barclays Premier League
(R) Relegated

=== FA Cup ===
FA Cup match details
Round	Date	Opponents	Venue	Result	Score F–A	Scorers	Attendance	Ref
Third round	2 January 2010	Milton Keynes Dons	A	W	2–1	Alexander 23' pen., Fletcher 35'	11,816 (1,913 away)	
Fourth round	23 January 2010	Reading	A	L	0–1		12,910 (1,070 away)	

=== Football League Cup ===
Football League Cup match details
Round	Date	Opponents	Venue	Result	Score F–A	Scorers	Attendance	Ref
Second round	25 August 2009	Hartlepool United	A	W	2–1 (a.e.t.)	Fletcher (2) 84', 108'	3,501 (500 away)	
Third round	22 September 2009	Barnsley	A	L	2–3	Fletcher 21', Eagles 52'	6,270 (1,066 away)	

=== Friendlies ===
Burnley hosted an impromptu friendly against Accrington Stanley at Turf Moor on 8 September 2009, with all gate receipts going towards the "Save our Stanley" campaign to support the club while it faced financial difficulties.
