= Vjeran Simunić =

Croatian footballer and manager

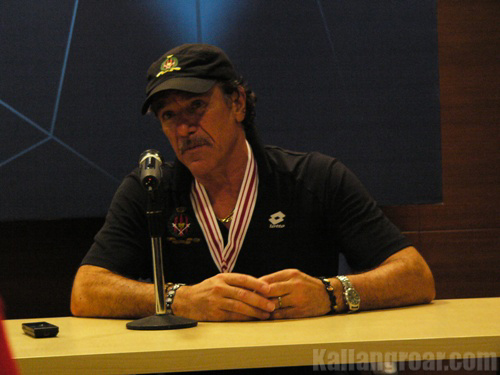
- Simunić with DPMM in 2009

Personal information
- Full name: Vjeran Simunić
- Date of birth: 26 April 1953 (age 73)
- Place of birth: Split, PR Croatia, Yugoslavia
- Position: Goalkeeper

Senior career*
Years	Team	Apps	(Gls)
1974	Hajduk Split	7	(0)
1975	Šibenik		
1975–1976	Dinamo Vinkovci	11	(0)
1976–1982	NK Zagreb	72	(0)
1982–1983	Sporting CP		
1983–1986	Yomiuri Soccer Club	1	(0)
1986–1987	Catanzaro		
1987–1988	Vigor Lamezia		
1988–1989	Mosor		
1989–1991	Posušje		

Managerial career
- 1994: Lipik
- Čazmatrans
- Čakovec
- 1998–1999: East Riffa Club
- 1999–2000: RNK Split
- Mosor
- Uskok Klis
- Slavonac Stari Perkovci
- Mladost Zabok
- 2000: Posušje
- 2001: Zrinjski Mostar
- 2002: Hrvatski Dragovoljac
- 2002: Kamen Ingrad
- 2002–2003: Zadar
- 2003–2004: Cibalia
- 2005: Zadar
- 2005: Segesta
- 2006: Čelik Zenica
- 2006: Trnje
- 2006: Marsonia
- 2007: Dugopolje
- 2007–2008: Imotski
- 2008–2009: DPMM
- 2008–2009: Brunei
- 2009: Imotski
- 2010: Mosor
- 2010: Međimurje
- 2010–2011: Ho Chi Minh City
- 2011–2013: DPMM
- 2013–2014: Brunei
- 2014: Segesta
- 2014: Perak
- 2015: Perak
- 2015–2016: Sabah
- 2017–2018: Zadar
- 2018: Solin
- 2018–2019: Vitez
- 2019–2020: Zagora Unešić
- 2020: Vodice
- * Club domestic league appearances and goals

Vjeran Simunić (born 26 April 1953) is a Croatian professional football manager and former player.

== Playing career ==
Simunić started his playing career in Hajduk Split in the 1970s. He did not get too many chances in Hajduk as the competition was very big at the time. After Hajduk, his next station was HNK Šibenik, then Dinamo Vinkovci and NK Zagreb, where he spent most of the playing career. In 1982 he made transfer to Sporting Lisabon. After one season he moved to Japan. He was first European player to play in Japan. The club was Tokyo Verdy. After two more challenges in Italy, he returned to native country. He finished his playing career in Bosnia and Herzegovina, with NK Posušje.

== Managerial career ==
Simunić started his rich managerial career in Lipik, in 1994. Then he changed a couple of Croatian clubs before moving to Bahrain. However, he could not stay too much abroad, and he returned to Croatia, starting impressive row of 13 Croatian clubs, interrupted by 3 Bosnian clubs (Posušje, Zrinjski Mostar and Čelik Zenica) in 8 years. He said that his mission is to improve table situation of every club he takes, and in most cases he did that. That is why he had so many offers. Searching for new challenge, he moved to Asia, this time Brunei. He managed club DPMM, soon after his good results with that club made him coach of the Brunei national team. He was very popular, had lot of fans in country and even got Happy Birthday song chanted by fans during one match. But, he suddenly returned to Croatia, and took manager chair of NK Imotski, where he stayed for only one month. Then he took NK Mosor once again but left that club also, and after one half-season. He took Croatian second division club NK Međimurje, at the start of 2010–11 season.

He returned to coach Brunei's only professional club DPMM FC in 2012 after FIFA allowed it to rejoin S.League after 20 months of suspension due to government interference in Football Association of Brunei Darussalam. Simunić lead Brunei DPMM FC to a successful season in 2012 S.League as he guided them to win 2012 Singapore League Cup and finished second in the 2012 S.League after two seasons without competitive football. Simunić was named as Coach of the Year at S.League Awards Night for his achievement in 2012 S.League.

In January 2013, Simunić was appointed as the Brunei national football team head coach.

On 16 September 2014, Simunić was appointed as the head coach and technical director of Perak FA on a two-year contract, but after only two months he was replaced with M. Karathu before the season even started. Simunić were reassigned to youth development academy of Perak FA. Eventually however, in August 2015, he was reappointed as the head coach of Perak after Karathu were relieved of his position in July 2015 due to poor performances of Perak in the league.

He was released by Perak at the end of unsuccessful Malaysia Cup 2015 campaign, and subsequently joined another Malaysian team, Sabah FA, on December the same year. He only hold the post as the head coach of Sabah until June 2016, when he stepped down following unsatisfactory performances by the team during his tenure.

After Sabah, Simunić returned to manage Zadar. After Zadar, he managed Solin, Bosnian club Vitez and Zagora Unešić.

Since 21 September 2020, Simunić has managed Croatian third division club NK Vodice.

== Honours ==
=== Manager ===
Posušje

- First League of Herzeg-Bosnia: 1999–2000

DPMM

- Singapore League Cup: 2009, 2012
