= Ante Barać =

Croatian footballer

Ante Barac
Personal information
- Date of birth: 27 September 1980 (age 46)
- Place of birth: Split, Croatia
- Height: 1.90 m (6 ft 3 in)
- Position: Midfielder

Senior career*
Years	Team	Apps	(Gls)
-2006	Pomorac		
2006	Imotski	8	(1)
2007-2009	Moslavina	64	(12)
2009-2011	Dugopolje	30+	(3+)
2012–2013	Hougang United	20	(1)
2013	Konavljanin	14	(3)
2013	Mosor	16	(6)
2014-2016	Zagora Unešić	76	(27)
2016-2020	Sloga Mravince	86	(36)
2020-	Primorac Stobreč	102	(25)
- * Club domestic league appearances and goals

Ante Barać (born September 27, 1980) is a Croatian footballer who plays for Primorac Stobreč in his home country. Barać is a midfielder from Split, Croatia.

== Singapore ==
Scoring a free-kick in a 3–0 triumph over Balestier Khalsa in the S.League, Barac's goal was picked as the goal of the month for July 2012. He was also one of the midfielders in Goal.com's 2012 Round 7 S.League Team of the Week for his chance-creating and set-pieces to help his Housing beat Woodlands Wellington 3–1.

Authored one goal in the 2012 Singapore Cup, in a 2-1 quarterfinal win over Gombak United.

The midfielder's appearance bears some similitude to that of English footballer Bobby Charlton.
