= Tales dos Santos =

Brazilian footballer

Personal information
- Full name: Tales Ricarte dos Santos
- Date of birth: June 1, 1984 (age 42)
- Place of birth: Goianésia, Goias, Brazil
- Height: 1.97 m (6 ft 5 1/2 in)
- Position: Defender

Youth career
- 2002: Ituiutabana Esporte Clube
- 2002: Rio Branco

Senior career*
Years	Team	Apps	(Gls)
2003–2004	São Cristóvão	9	(2)
2005–2006	DPMM FC		(10)
2007–2009	Aparecida	20	(5)
2008	Associação Atlética Alvorada	9	(3)
2009	Tocantins Futebol Clube	10	(3)
2010	Vila Aurora	13	(2)
2010	Formosa	13	(3)
2011	Tocantinópolis	11	(2)
2012–2013	DPMM FC	38	(11)
2014	Phuket F.C.	18	(2)
2014	Sabah	0	(0)
2015	Sanna Khanh Hoa F.C.	18	(2)
- * Club domestic league appearances and goals

Tales dos Santos (born 1 June 1984) is a retired association football player who played as a defender.

== Career ==
Tales Dos Santos' career is a familiar one to that of many Brazilian men's footballers He has played for numerous clubs and good experience. In 2014, he was set to sign for Sabah FA however due to league restrictions he was unable to sign for the club. He went on to sign for V.League 1 club Sanna Khanh Hoa F.C.

After leaving Vietnam, Tales underwent trials at several Indonesian sides namely Persija Jakarta and Persela Lamongan but ultimately failed to gain a contract.

== Honours ==
=== Team ===
- 2012 Singapore League Cup Champions with DPMM FC
- 2012 S.League Runner-Up with DPMM FC
- 2013 Singapore League Cup Runner -up with DPMM FC
