= André Martins (footballer, born 1989) =

Portuguese footballer (born 1989)

Personal information
- Full name: André Filipe Franco Martins
- Date of birth: 12 October 1989 (age 37)
- Place of birth: Odivelas, Portugal
- Height: 1.93 m (6 ft 4 in)
- Position: Goalkeeper

Youth career
- 1997–1998: Futebol Benfica
- 1998–2002: Tenente Valdez
- 2002–2008: Sporting CP

Senior career*
Years	Team	Apps	(Gls)
2008–2009	Casa Pia	6	(0)
2009–2010	Igreja Nova	5	(0)
2010–2013	Real Massamá	54	(0)
2013	Tampines Rovers	11	(0)
2014–2015	Sintrense	0	(0)
2015–2016	Real Massamá	16	(0)
2016–2017	Alta de Lisboa	1	(0)
2017–2018	Pêro Pinheiro	4	(0)
2018–2019	Oeiras	27	(0)
2019–2020	Atlético	18	(0)
Total		142	(0)

International career
2005–2006	Portugal U17	6	(0)
2007	Portugal U18	1	(0)
- * Club domestic league appearances and goals

André Filipe Franco Martins (born 12 October 1989) is a Portuguese former professional footballer who played as a goalkeeper.

== Club career ==
Born in Odivelas, Lisbon District, Martins played youth football for three local clubs, including Sporting CP from ages 12 to 18. He competed solely in the lower leagues in his country, starting out at Casa Pia A.C. in the 2008–09 season.

In June 2013, Martins signed for S. League side Tampines Rovers FC from Real SC, being joined in the adventure by his compatriots Diogo Caramelo and Vítor Ladeiras. He soon picked up an injury and, at the end of the campaign, which ended with championship conquest, returned to Portugal and its third division.
