= Hanafi Ghazali =

Singaporean footballer

Personal information
- Positions: Defender; midfielder; winger; forward

Senior career*
Years	Team	Apps	(Gls)
	Perth Glory FC	0	(0)
2012	Lion City Sailors FC	0	(0)
2013	Young Lions FC	3	(0)
2014	Perth Glory FC	0	(0)
2015-2017	Balcatta FC	45	(2)
2018	Inglewood United FC	34	(0)
- * Club domestic league appearances and goals

Hanafi Ghazali is a Singaporean-Australian retired footballer.

== Career ==
In 2007, Ghazali moved with his family to Australia, where he played youth football and eventually moved through Perth Glory's youth teams. In 2010, Ghazali trained with the first team and played a pre-season game alongside England international Robbie Fowler in an 8-0 friendly win over Rockingham City. After performing his National Service Singapore, he played for the Young Lions and Lion City Sailors professionally in the S.League before returning to Australia and continuing semi-professionally in the NPL.
