= Masatake Sato =

Japanese footballer

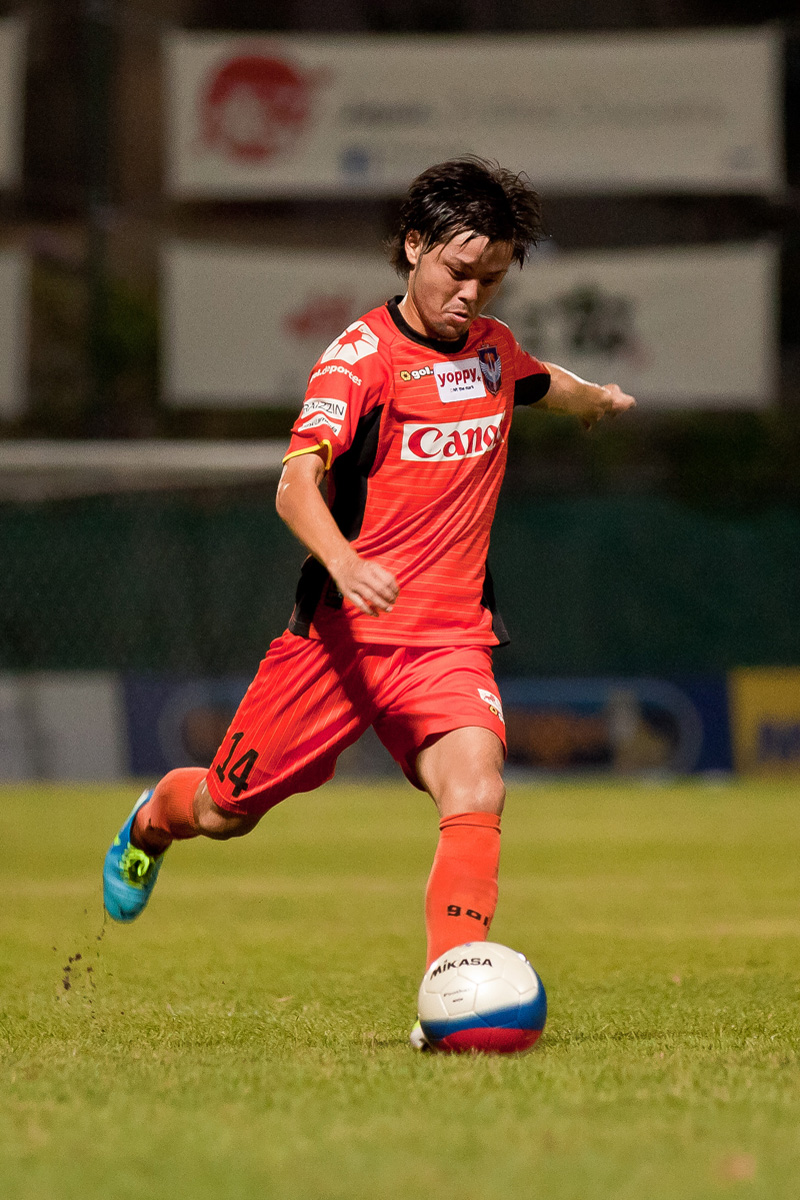
- Masatake Sato taking a freekick against Warriors FC at Jurong East Stadium on 20 September 2013

Personal information
- Date of birth: March 19, 1991 (age 35)
- Place of birth: Niigata, Japan
- Height: 1.74 m (5 ft 8 1/2 in)
- Position: Midfielder

Youth career
- Hokuetsu High School
- JAPAN Soccer College

Senior career*
Years	Team	Apps	(Gls)
2012–2013	Albirex Niigata FC (Singapore)	43	(5)
- * Club domestic league appearances and goals as of 3 February 2013

Masatake Sato (佐藤 昌丈, Satō Masatake; born March 19, 1991) is a Japanese football player previously playing for Albirex Niigata FC (Singapore) in the S.League. He is currently a free agent after playing for 2 seasons at the club.

== Career ==
The midfielder signed in December 2011 for Albirex Niigata Singapore FC in Singapore's S.League. A regular fixture in the starting lineup, effective in set pieces. Primarily a central midfielder, he would at times operate on either flanks.
