= Vítor Ladeiras =

Portuguese footballer

Personal information
- Full name: Vítor Hugo Correia Ladeiras
- Date of birth: 10 April 1992 (age 34)
- Place of birth: Sintra, Portugal
- Position: Midfielder

Youth career
- 2002–2010: Estrela Amadora
- 2010–2011: Real Massamá

Senior career*
Years	Team	Apps	(Gls)
2011–2013	Real Massamá	48	(3)
2013	Tampines Rovers	13	(1)
2016–2017	Samora Correia		
2017–2018	Atlético Cacém		
2018–2019	Bucelenses	27	(3)
2019–2020	Pêro Pinheiro	17	(0)
2020–2021	Alta de Lisboa	5	(2)
- * Club domestic league appearances and goals

Vítor Hugo Correia Ladeiras (born 10 April 1992) is a Portuguese former footballer who played as a midfielder.

== Club career ==
Born in Sintra, Lisbon District, Ladeiras spent eight years in C.F. Estrela da Amadora's youth system after joining at the age of 10. He started his senior career with neighbouring Real SC, in the fourth division.

In June 2013, Ladeiras signed for Singaporean club Tampines Rovers FC following a short trial, being joined in the adventure by his countrymen Diogo Caramelo and André Martins. He scored his only goal as a professional on 20 September, playing the full 90 minutes and closing a 3–1 home win against Tanjong Pagar United FC.
