= Seiji Saito =

Japanese footballer

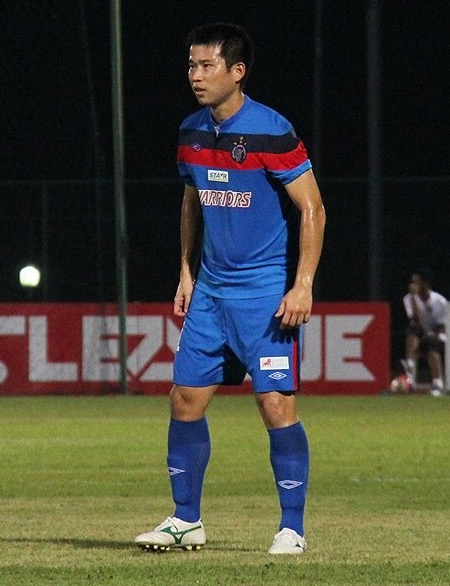

Personal information
- Date of birth: 27 May 1986 (age 40)
- Place of birth: Saitama, Japan
- Height: 1.82 m (6 ft 0 in)
- Position: Midfielder

Youth career
- 2003–2005: São Paulo

Senior career*
Years	Team	Apps	(Gls)
2005–2006	São Paulo		
2006–2007	AD Guarujá		
2007–2008	Mixto		
2008–2010	AD Guarujá		
2010	Jacareí		
2010–2011	Kashiwa Reysol		
2011–2012	CF Fão	5	(0)
2012	Warriors FC	5	(1)
2012	Korona Kielce	0	(0)
2013–2014	Salgaocar		
2015	FK Tukums 2000	6	(0)
2016	PSM Makassar		
2016–2017	Sitra Club		
2017–2019	Chao Pak Kei		
2021	AD Cariari Pococí		

International career
	Japan U20	20	(8)
- * Club domestic league appearances and goals

Seiji Saito (斉藤 誠司, Saitō Seiji) (born 27 May 1987) is a Japanese former professional footballer who played as a midfielder.

== Club career ==
Saito played top league Kashiwa Reysol in Japan. And he also played in Japan national team U15,16,17,18,20. He moved to São Paulo FC in Brazil when he was 16 years old. He played for three years at São Paulo FC. He then played in Brazil for eight years. And he played as a professional player in Portugal, Latvia, Indonesia, India, Singapore, Bahrain. He also played in Polish club Korona Kielce.

On 24 November 2017, Chao Pak Kei signed Saito to a one-year contract.

== International career ==
Saito has represented Japan at numerous youth levels. He was a member of the Japan team for the Japan U15, U16, U18, U20, U21 tours in England.

== Gallery ==
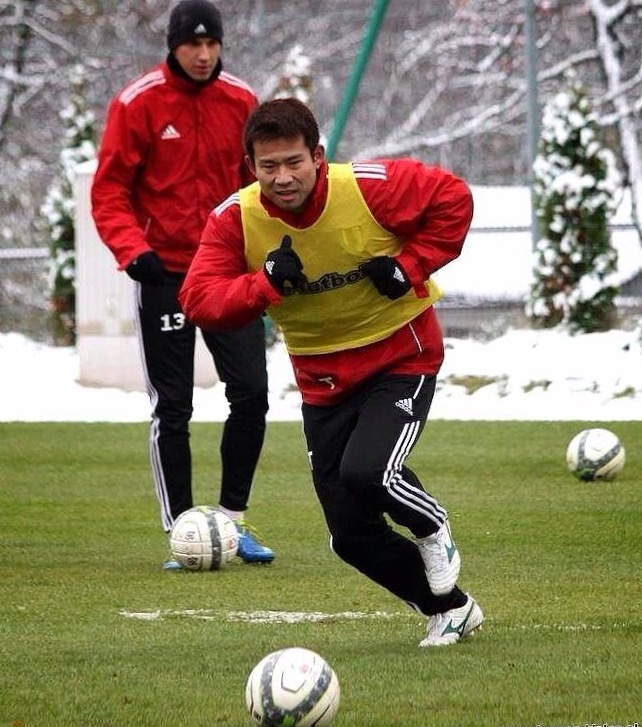

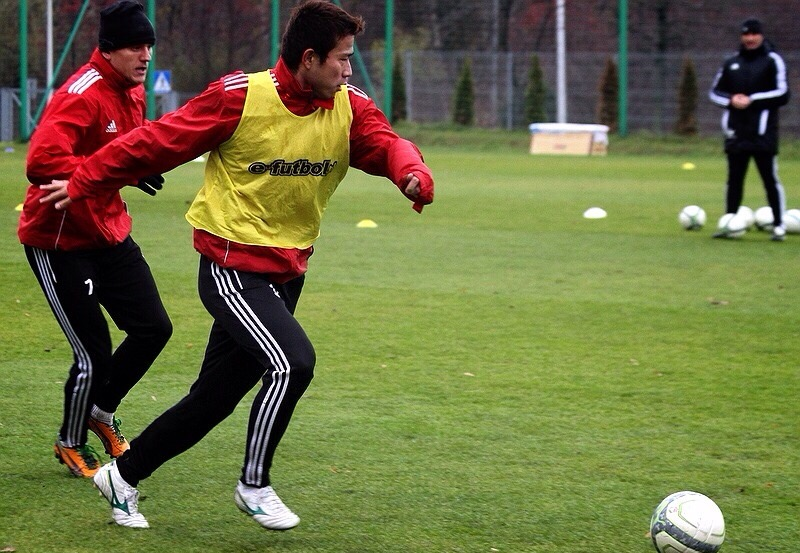

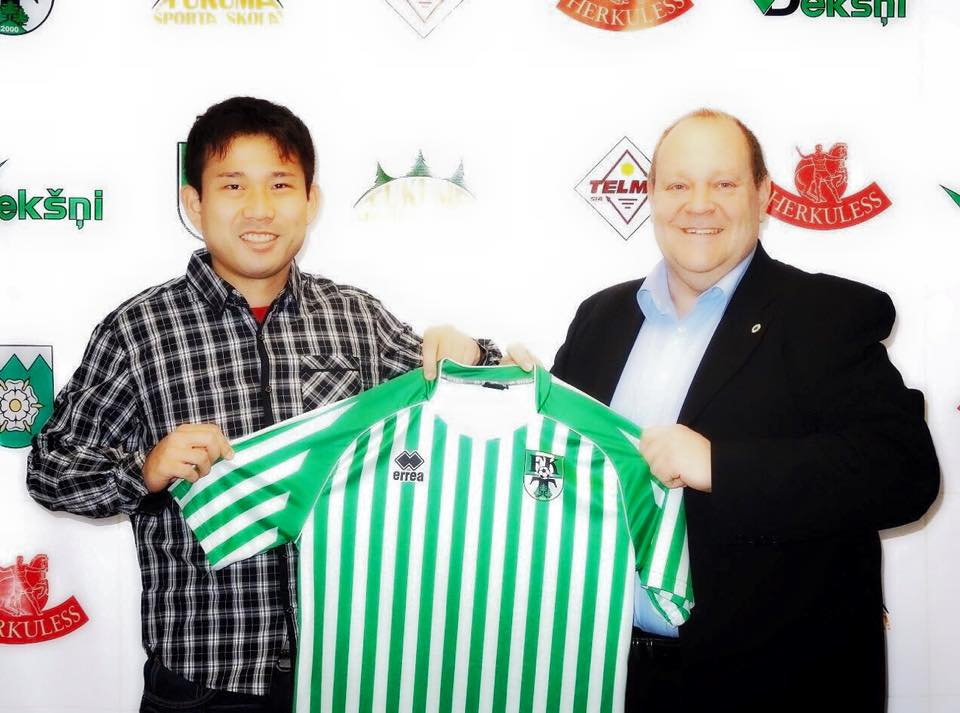
