= Diogo Caramelo =

Portuguese footballer (born 1992)

Personal information
- Full name: Diogo Miguel Caramelo Santos
- Date of birth: 22 November 1992 (age 33)
- Place of birth: Lisbon, Portugal
- Height: 1.79 m (5 ft 10 in)
- Position: Striker

Youth career
- 2001–2011: Benfica

Senior career*
Years	Team	Apps	(Gls)
2011	Ribeirão	6	(1)
2011–2013	Real Massamá	34	(10)
2013	Tampines Rovers	11	(1)
2014	Ribeirão	5	(0)
2014–2016	Cova Piedade	48	(3)
2016–2017	Barreirense	5	(0)
2017	Atlético Malveira	12	(2)
2017–2018	Loures	18	(4)
2018–2019	Fabril	27	(12)
2019–2020	Atlético	8	(0)
2020–2021	Alta de Lisboa	4	(1)
Total		178	(34)
- * Club domestic league appearances and goals

Diogo Miguel Caramelo Santos (born 22 November 1992), known as Caramelo, is a Portuguese former professional footballer who played as a striker.

== Club career ==
Born in Lisbon, Caramelo played youth football with S.L. Benfica. He made his debut as senior in the lower leagues, successively representing G.D. Ribeirão and Real SC.

Caramelo signed for Singapore club Tampines Rovers FC in June 2013 after a short trial, being joined in the adventure by fellow Portuguese Vítor Ladeiras and André Martins. He scored his only goal in the S.League on 25 August, helping to a 6–2 away win against Brunei DPMM FC.

Caramelo subsequently returned to his country, resuming his career in the third division or lower.
