= Michal Piskoř =

Czech ice hockey forward

- Born: January 16, 1967 (age 58)
- Height: 6 ft 2 in (188 cm)
- Weight: 1,894 lb (859 kg; 135 st 4 lb)
- Position: Forward
- Shot: Left
- Played for: TJ Zetor Brno; HC Vítkovice; HC Železárny Třinec; HC Slezan Opava; GKS Tychy; Podhale Nowy Targ
- Playing career: 1984–2006

Michal Piskoř (born January 16, 1967) is a Czech former professional ice hockey forward.

Piskoř played in the Czechoslovak First Ice Hockey League and the Czech Extraliga for TJ Zetor Brno, HC Vítkovice, HC Železárny Třinec and HC Slezan Opava. He also played in the Polska Hokej Liga for GKS Tychy
Podhale Nowy Targ. Piskoř was also head coach of Slezan Opava from 2010 to 2012.
