= Rhysh Roshan Rai =

Singaporean footballer (born 1985)

Personal information
- Full name: Rhysh Roshan Rai
- Date of birth: 23 April 1985 (age 41)
- Place of birth: Singapore
- Height: 1.92 m (6 ft 4 in)
- Position: Midfielder

Youth career
- 1996: Milo Soccer School
- 1999: Clementi Khalsa
- 2000–2004: Home United

Senior career*
Years	Team	Apps	(Gls)
2009	Balestier Khalsa FC	17	(0)
2010–2011	Singapore Armed Forces FC	38	(0)
2012	Home United	5	(0)
- * Club domestic league appearances and goals

Rhysh Roshan Rai (born 23 April 1985) is a Singaporean former footballer who played as a midfielder. Roshan's amateur football experience began at the age of 11 when his father encouraged him to attend trials the MILO National Soccer School was hosting. This school was established in 1974 as a means of grooming teenage sporting talent through its youth development programs. Impressed by his potential, the scout at the trial proceeded to select the left footer to represent the 'West' zone.

Roshan played for this division for 2 years before advancing to Clementi Khalsa FC (Under-14). He was also concurrently playing for his school's (Anglo-Chinese School – Barker) soccer team. Unbeknownst to this young flair, a scout was present at one of these games and approached his school's coach. A chance to play for Home United stemmed out of this fortuity. Roshan nabbed this opportunity and represented Home United for the next 3–4 years. National service soon beckoned and he took a much required half-time from football.

In 2007, while pursuing his 2-year degree in Mass Communication, he played professionally for Balestier Khalsa FC.

In 2010, he joined Singapore Armed Forces. He played for the club in the 2010 AFC Champions League group stage.

After his football career, Roshan became a football pundit and commentator.
