= Benjamin Lee (footballer) =

Danish footballer (born 1989)

Personal information
- Full name: Benjamin Kristoffersen Lee
- Date of birth: 15 April 1989 (age 37)
- Place of birth: Denmark
- Height: 1.74 m (5 ft 8 1/2 in)
- Position: Striker

Team information
- Current team: Young Lions

Senior career*
Years	Team	Apps	(Gls)
2008	AB		
2008–2009	B93		
2009–2010	VIF		
2010	Frem	15	(0)
2010–2011	AB	35	(5)
2012–	Young Lions	20	(3)
- * Club domestic league appearances and goals as of 17:15, 21 November 2012 (UTC)

Benjamin Kristoffersen Lee (born 15 April 1989) is a Danish professional footballer who plays in Singapore for Young Lions, as a striker.

== Career ==
Lee has played in Denmark and Singapore for AB, B93, VIF, Frem and Young Lions.

== Personal life ==
Lee's father was born in Singapore and later gained Danish nationality.
