= Osman Bashiru =

Ghanaian footballer

Personal information
- Full name: Osman Bashiru
- Date of birth: 5 May 1989 (age 37)
- Place of birth: Kumasi, Ghana
- Height: 1.83 m (6 ft 0 in)
- Position: Striker

Youth career
- 2006–2008: King Faisal Babes

Senior career*
Years	Team	Apps	(Gls)
2008–2010	King Faisal Babes		(4)
2009–2010	→ Hapoel Petah Tikva (loan)	32	(7)
2010–2011	Hapoel Ashkelon	14	(0)
2011	→ Sektzia Ness Ziona (loan)	14	(0)
2011	Hapoel Herzliya	0	(0)
2012	DPMM	23	(5)
2013–2014	Asante Kotoko	4	(0)
2014–2015	Ashanti Gold		
2020	King Faisal		

International career
- Ghana U20
- * Club domestic league appearances and goals

Osman Bashiru (born 5 May 1989, in Kumasi) is a Ghanaian former professional football player and current coach who played as a striker.

== Club career ==
=== Israel ===
Bashiru arrived to Israeli club Hapoel Petah Tikva as part of a loan agreement with his club in Ghana. While he faltered early, he managed to improve as time went by with Hapoel and the club is going to pick up the option to purchase him for US $100,000. He moved to Hapoel Ashkelon but went on loan to Sektzia Ness Ziona in the winter transfer window.

=== Brunei ===
After a spell with Hapoel Herzliya without making an appearance, Bashiru moved to Brunei DPMM FC as the Brunei team were preparing for their readmission to the 2012 S.League. He managed five goals in 23 appearances as the Bruneians clinched second place as well as winning the year's League Cup, but was not retained by the club at the season's end.

=== Return to Ghana ===
Bashiru returned to Ghana in 2013 and signed a deal with Asante Kotoko after a successful trial, but only managed four appearances for the eventual league champions before getting released in August 2014. He then moved to Ashanti Gold the following month and spent two seasons with them, winning another Ghana Premier League title in 2015. He was released at the end of the year.

It was not until 2020 that Bashiru returned to league football with former club King Faisal for the 2019–20 Ghana Premier League season. The team were rock bottom of the league when the league was cancelled due to the COVID-19 pandemic.

== Coaching career ==
Bashiru is currently working on his coaching badges, and serves as assistant coach at Ghana Division One side Ebony FC.

== Honours ==
=== Team ===
DPMM FC

- Singapore League Cup: 2012
- S.League: 2012 (runner-up)

Asante Kotoko

- Ghana Premier League: 2013–14

Ashanti Gold

- Ghana Premier League: 2015
