= Arif Ali =

Pakistani-born British journalist and publisher

- Born: 21 June 1961; Pakistan
- Died: 31 January 2008 (aged 46); London, United Kingdom

Arif Ali (21 June 1961 – 31 January 2008) was a Pakistani-born British publisher and journalist. He was the regional product director for the Associated Press news agency in Europe, Middle East and Africa.

== Early years ==
Arif Ali was born on 21 June 1961, in Pakistan.

== Career ==
He first became employed at the AP London bureau in October 1982 as a field service technician. Ali often worked on risky assignments for the AP, including as a technical operations technician in Somalia in the early 1990s as the country collapsed in interclan warfare. His main tasks at this time in his career were keeping satellite phones, satellite systems and power generators working so that AP reporters could file reports for the wire service from remote locations such as Somalia.

Ali also managed a wide range of AP technical projects during his career with the organization. Ali managed the Associated Press Server from 1995 until 2003. He also served as the product manager for the project manager for AP Photo Archive from 1995 to 1999 before being promoted to director of photo technology from 1999 to 2003. Additionally, Ali worked as product manager for the content management systems eAP and eDistribute in 2003 and 2004.

Ali also oversaw the technical operations coordination for large, special events covered by the AP, such as the 1998 Winter Olympics in Nagano, Japan, and the 2000 Summer Olympics in Sydney, Australia.

In 2006 and 2007, Ali guided the creation of a new AP Arabic text service.

Also in 2007, he was honored with the Gramling Award, the Associated Press' top staff award for overseeing the creation and implementation of new AP services.

== Death ==
Arif Ali died at his home in London on 31 January 2008 at the age of 46. His funeral was held in Slough, United Kingdom.
