= Takeshi Ito (footballer) =

Japanese footballer

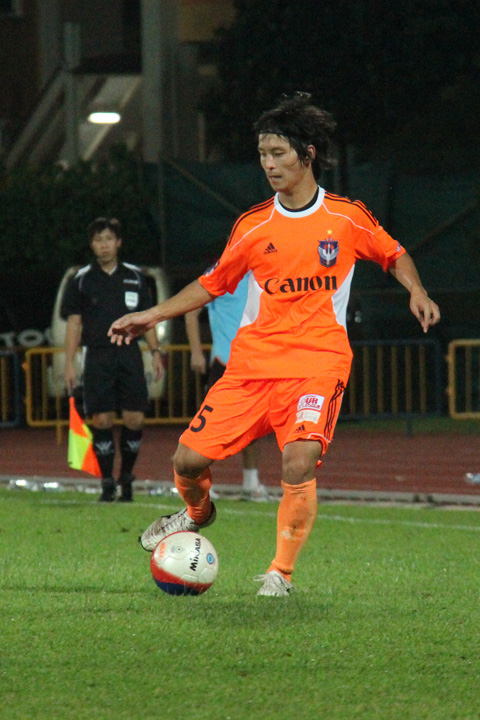
- Ito in 2012

Personal information
- Date of birth: September 11, 1987 (age 39)
- Place of birth: Osaka, Japan
- Height: 1.72 m (5 ft 8 in)
- Position: Left-back

Youth career
- 2003–2005: Hatsushiba Hashimoto High School

Senior career*
Years	Team	Apps	(Gls)
2006–2009	Nara Sangyo University		
2010–2011	Blaublitz Akita	8	(0)
2012–2013	Albirex Niigata Singapore	24	(0)
2013	OFK Grbalj	2	(0)
2014	Deutschlandsberger SC		
2014	Kapfenberger SV	3	(0)
2015	FC Lankowitz		
2016	Deutschlandsberger SC	10	(1)
- * Club domestic league appearances and goals as of 1 August 2016

Takeshi Ito (伊藤 健史, Itō Takeshi) (born September 11, 1987} is a Japanese former professional footballer who played as a left-back.

Ito was born in Osaka}. He previously played with Japanese side Blaublitz Akita, Albirex Niigata FC (Singapore)., OFK Grbalj in the 2012–13 Montenegrin First League, then with Kapfenberger SV in the 2014–15 Austrian Football First League, another Austrian side FC Lankowitz, and Deutschlandsberger SC in the Austrian Regionalliga, having already played with them earlier in second half of 2013–14 season.
