= Gligor Gligorov =

Macedonian footballer (born 1987)

Personal information
- Date of birth: 5 March 1987 (age 39)
- Place of birth: Probištip, SR Macedonia, SFR Yugoslavia
- Height: 1.74 m (5 ft 9 in)
- Position: Right-back

Senior career*
Years	Team	Apps	(Gls)
2004–2010	Sileks	112	(14)
2011	Baník Ostrava	2	(0)
2012	Tampines Rovers	23	(1)
2013	Zrinjski Mostar	3	(0)
2013–2015	Bregalnica	36	(1)
2015–2018	Sileks	66	(6)
2018–2019	Kit-Go	1	(0)

International career
2009	Macedonia	1	(0)
- * Club domestic league appearances and goals

Gligor Gligorov (born 5 March 1987) is a Macedonian former professional footballer who played as a right-back.

== International career ==
Gligorov made his senior debut for Macedonia as a late substitute for Goran Pandev in a November 2009 friendly match against Iran in Teheran.

== Career statistics ==
As of 10 May 2010

Club	Season	League		Cup		Europe		Total	
Club	Season	Apps	Goals	Apps	Goals	Apps	Goals	Apps	Goals
Sileks Kratovo	2004-05	3	0	-	-	-	-	3	0
Sileks Kratovo	2005-06	15	0	-	-	-	-	15	0
Sileks Kratovo	2006-07	19	0	-	-	-	-	19	0
Sileks Kratovo	2007-08	26	5	-	-	-	-	26	5
Sileks Kratovo	2008-09	27	7	-	-	-	-	27	7
Sileks Kratovo	2009-10	22	2	-	-	-	-	22	2
Sileks Kratovo	Total	112	14	-	-	-	-	112	14
Career	Total	112	14	-	-	-	-	112	14
