= Saša Dreven =

Croatian footballer

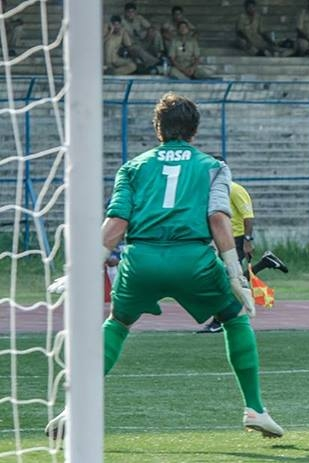
- Dreven with Tampines Rovers against East Bengal at the 2013 AFC Cup

Personal information
- Date of birth: 27 January 1990 (age 36)
- Place of birth: Varaždin, SFR Yugoslavia
- Height: 1.87 m (6 ft 1 1/2 in)
- Position: Goalkeeper

Team information
- Current team: ASKÖ Oedt
- Number: 1

Youth career
- Varteks

Senior career*
| Years | Team | Apps | (Gls) |
| 2009–2012 | Varteks / Varaždin | 47 | (0) |
| 2012–2013 | Tampines Rovers | 37 | (0) |
| 2013 | Podravina | 15 | (1) |
| 2014–2015 | Istra 1961 | 14 | (0) |
| 2014–2015 | → Istra 1961 II | 3 | (0) |
| 2015 | Zavrč | 0 | (0) |
| 2016–2017 | Varteks | 33 | (0) |
| 2018 | Pajde | | |
| 2019 | Lingenau | 10 | (0) |
| 2019-2020 | SW Bregenz | 17 | (0) |
| 2020 | Rotenberg | 6 | (0) |
| 2021– | ASKÖ Oedt | 0 | (0) |

International career^{‡}
| 2005 | Croatia U15 | 1 | (0) |
| 2006 | Croatia U16 | 5 | (0) |
| 2006 | Croatia U17 | 6 | (0) |
| 2008 | Croatia U18 | 4 | (0) |
| 2007–2008 | Croatia U19 | 5 | (0) |
- * Club domestic league appearances and goals as of 26 March 2017 ‡ National team caps and goals as of 26 March 2017

Saša Dreven (born 27 January 1990) is a Croatian football goalkeeper. Dreven is currently playing for Austrian lower league side ASKÖ Oedt.

== Club career ==
=== Varaždin ===
Hailing from Trnovec Bartolovečki, he was a product of the NK Varteks youth academy and joined the first team in 2009 as a 19-year-old. His debut for Varteks in the Prva HNL came in a 0–0 draw on 22 November 2009 against NK Slaven Koprivnica. The team fell into financial difficulty, changed its name to NK Varaždin in mid-2010, suffered two different suspensions from play by the Croatian Football Federation; Dreven left the team, with unpaid wages, in 2012.

=== Tampines Rovers ===
He joined the Singaporean side in 2012 on a free transfer. His debut came on 12 February 2012 against DPMM FC in a 2–2 draw. At the end of the season he was released.

=== Return to Croatia ===
Dreven returned to Croatia in the summer of 2013, joining the third-tier side NK Podravina from Ludbreg, making a mark by scoring from a penalty as well. During the winter break, he made his return to Prva HNL signing a 2 1/2-year contract with NK Istra 1961. Following a season at Istra 1961, he moved on to a short, fruitless stint at NK Zavrč before joining lower-tier fan-run NK Varteks (unassociated with his previous Varteks club).Varteks.

=== Austria ===
He moved to Austria in 2019 to play for 5th tier-outfit Lingenau and later played for SW Bregenz on the third level.

== Club statistics ==
As of 3 April 2013.

| Club | Season | League | | Cup | | International | | Total | |
| Club | Season | Apps | Goals | Apps | Goals | Apps | Goals | Apps | Goals |
|---|---|---|---|---|---|---|---|---|---|
Varteks / Varaždin
| Varteks / Varaždin | 2008–09 | 18 | 0 | 0 | 0 | 0 | 0 | 18 | 0 |
| Varteks / Varaždin | 2009–10 | 16 | 0 | 4 | 0 | 0 | 0 | 20 | 0 |
| Varteks / Varaždin | 2010–11 | 4 | 0 | 2 | 0 | 0 | 0 | 6 | 0 |
| Varteks / Varaždin | 2011–12 | 9 | 0 | 1 | 0 | 0 | 0 | 10 | 0 |
| Total in Croatia | | 47 | 0 | 7 | 0 | 0 | 0 | 54 | 0 |
Tampines Rovers
| Tampines Rovers | 2012 | 24 | 0 | 10 | 0 | 6 | 0 | 40 | 0 |
| Tampines Rovers | 2013 | 13 | 0 | 2 | 0 | 6 | 0 | 21 | 0 |
| Total in Singapore | | 37 | 0 | 12 | 0 | 12 | 0 | 61 | 0 |
| Career totals | | 84 | 0 | 19 | 0 | 12 | 0 | 115 | 0 |
