= Davor Piškor =

Croatian footballer

Personal information
- Full name: Davor Piškor
- Date of birth: 23 April 1982 (age 44)
- Place of birth: Zagreb, SFR Yugoslavia
- Height: 1.72 m (5 ft 7 1/2 in)
- Position: Striker

Youth career
- Dinamo Zagreb

Senior career*
Years	Team	Apps	(Gls)
2000–2002	Dinamo Zagreb		
2000–2001	→ Segesta (loan)		
2001–2002	→ Novalja (loan)		
2002–2007	Inter Zaprešić		
2007–2008	Međimurje	50	(15)
2008–2010	NK Zagreb	32	(5)
2010	Zadar	7	(0)
2010	Croatia Sesvete	11	(2)
2011	Kastrioti	15	(1)
2011	Međimurje	13	(1)
2012	Tampines Rovers	11	(0)
2012	Nedelišće	0	(0)
2013-2014	SK Unterschützen	44	(13)
2015	ASKÖ Stinatz	17	(6)
- * Club domestic league appearances and goals as of 19 November 2022

Davor Piškor (born 23 April 1982 in Zagreb) is a retired Croatian footballer who played as a striker.

== Career ==
Piškor played the majority of his career in his native Croatia, but also had spells in Albania, Singapore and finished his career in Austria.
