= Ivan Jerković =

Croatian footballer

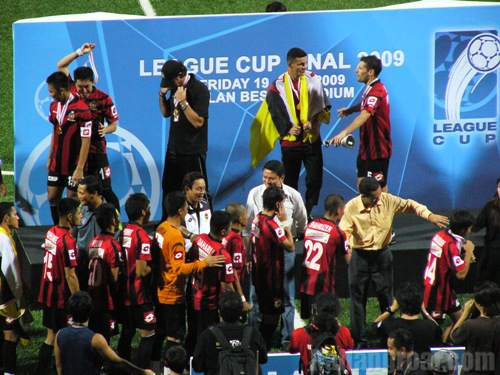
- Jerković (top, second from right) celebrating the 2009 Singapore League Cup

Personal information
- Date of birth: 13 January 1979 (age 47)
- Place of birth: Split, Croatia
- Position: Midfielder

Youth career
- Hajduk Split

Senior career*
Years	Team	Apps	(Gls)
1997–2001	Hajduk Split	11	(0)
1999–2000	→ Vukovar '91 (loan)	17	(1)
2001	Brotnjo Čitluk		
2002–2004	Zadar	57	(4)
2004–2006	Solin		
2007–2008	Pelita Jaya		
2009	DPMM FC	2	(7)
2010	Imotski	6	(1)
2010–2011	Singapore Armed Forces	50	(13)
2012	DPMM FC	24	(6)
2014	Val Kaštel Stari	16	(4)
- * Club domestic league appearances and goals

Ivan Jerković (born 13 January 1979) is a Croatian former professional footballer who played as a midfielder.

== Career ==
Jerković is a product of the Hajduk Split academy, spending most of his first full senior season on the bench, before going on loan at Vukovar '91.

Jerković played club football in Indonesia and Singapore for Pelita Jaya, Brunei DPMM and Singapore Armed Forces.

== Personal life ==
Jerković is nephew of Jurica Jerković, who played for Hajduk Split and FC Zurich.

== Honours ==
DPMM FC

- Singapore League Cup: 2012
- S.League runner-up: 2012
