= Yasuhiro Yamakoshi =

Japanese footballer

Personal information
- Date of birth: September 16, 1985 (age 41)
- Place of birth: Tokyo, Japan
- Height: 1.77 m (5 ft 9 1/2 in)
- Position: Forward

Team information
- Current team: Tonan Maebashi
- Number: 9

Youth career
- Teikyo High School
- Kanagawa University

Senior career*
Years	Team	Apps	(Gls)
2008–2011	F.C. Machida Zelvia	84	(26)
2012	Albirex Niigata Singapore	23	(15)
2013	Blaublitz Akita	9	(2)
2014–	Tonan Maebashi		
- * Club domestic league appearances and goals as of 18 September 2014

Yasuhiro Yamakoshi (山腰 泰博, Yamakoshi Yasuhiro; born September 16, 1985 in Tokyo) is a Japanese football player. He plays as a forward and is known for his powerful shots and short-ranged free kicks.
