= Julien Durand (footballer) =

French footballer (born 1983)

Personal information
- Date of birth: 15 March 1983 (age 43)
- Place of birth: Limoges, France
- Height: 1.73 m (5 ft 8 in)
- Positions: Midfielder; forward

Team information
- Current team: Stade Bordelais

Youth career
- –1997: AC Limoges Landouge
- 1997–1998: Limoges Foot 87

Senior career*
Years	Team	Apps	(Gls)
1998–2001	Rennes		
2001–2002	Martigues		
2002–2003	Stade Bordelais		
2003–2005	FC Langon		
2005–2011	SA Mérignac		
2011	Etoile FC	21	(2)
2012	Gombak United	15	(5)
2016–	Stade Bordelais	1	(0)
- * Club domestic league appearances and goals as of 21:03, 2 May 2018 (UTC)

Julien Durand (born 15 March 1983) is a French association footballer who is a fitness coach and occasional player for Stade Bordelais. He plays as a midfielder or forward.

== Career ==
Durand made his debut for Etoile FC in the 2–0 win over Geylang United on the 17 February 2011. He then went on to join Gombak United in the S.League in the first transfer window of the season in 2012.

Durand joined French amateur side Jeunesse Villenave as fitness coach in July 2014. In 2016 Durand he moved to French Championnat de France Amateur 2 side Stade Bordelais, again primarily as fitness coach, although he was registered as a player for the match against Nice reserves in Championnat National 2 on 27 January 2018.
