= Ahmed Fahmie =

Singaporean footballer

Personal information
- Full name: Ahmed Fahmie bin Jamil
- Date of birth: 20 April 1987 (age 39)
- Place of birth: Singapore
- Height: 1.70 m (5 ft 7 in)
- Position: Forward

Team information
- Current team: East Coast United FC
- Number: 8

Youth career
- 1998–2005: Home United

Senior career*
Years	Team	Apps	(Gls)
2006–2013	Tampines Rovers	52	(37)
2014	Home United	18	(12)

International career^{‡}
2012	Singapore	12	(3)
- * Club domestic league appearances and goals as of 06:54, 25 November 2014 (UTC) ‡ National team caps and goals as of 06:54, 25 November 2014 (UTC)

Ahmed Fahmie bin Jamil (born 20 April 1987) is a former Singaporean footballer who formerly played as a forward for S.League club Home United and the Singapore national team.

== Early life ==
Ahmed Fahmy was born and raised in Tampines, Singapore to the late Jamil Bin Sawi and Laila Binte Azzan Abdat. He went to Qiaonan Primary School and Pasir Ris Secondary School. And Temasek poly.He also has a younger brother named Ahmed Farhie Bin Jamil.

== Football career ==
Fahmy started his career at Home United in 1998, progressing through the club's youth system. He also represented Singapore's youth teams in the 2004 and 2005 Lion City Cup.

In 2006, he joined Tampines Rovers in the Prime League. Impressive displays earned him a starting place in the AFC Cup away defeat against Osotsapa FC.

Fahmy was the top-scorer in the Prime League in the 2006 and 2007 season.

Fahmy then announced his arrival in the S.League in 2008 when he scored a few vital goals for Tampines, most notably, a last minute equaliser against Woodlands Wellington FC.
