= Chris Anderson (footballer, born 1990) =

English footballer

Personal information
- Full name: Christopher Luke Anderson
- Date of birth: 2 October 1990 (age 36)
- Place of birth: Burnley, England
- Position: Midfielder

Team information
- Current team: Colne

Youth career
- 1999–2009: Burnley

Senior career*
Years	Team	Apps	(Gls)
2009–2011	Burnley	0	(0)
2012	Gombak United	24	(0)
2013–	Colne		
- * Club domestic league appearances and goals as of 10:46, 15 November 2014 (UTC)

Christopher Anderson (born 2 October 1990) is an English professional footballer who plays as a midfielder.

== Career ==
Anderson signed a one-year professional contract with Burnley in May 2009, having first joined the club at the age of nine, before being released in May 2011. He signed for Singaporean club Gombak United for the 2012 season, making his professional debut for them in February 2012. Upon his return to England, he started training with North West Counties Football League Premier Division side Colne, going on to sign for the club in December 2013.
