= 2011 Home United FC season =

Home United FC
- Chairman: Koh Siong Ling
- Manager: Lee Lim-Saeng
- S.League: –
Home colours	Away colours

Home United competedin the 2012 S.League.

== Squad ==
=== S.League squad ===
Squad No.	Name	Nationality	Date of birth (age)	Last club
Goalkeepers
1	Siddiq Durimi	(Singapore)	27 May 1988 (age 37)	(Singapore) Geylang International
17	Fajar Sarib	(Singapore)	4 August 1977 (age 48)	(Singapore) Woodlands Wellington
18	Lionel Lewis	(Singapore)	16 December 1982 (age 43)	(Singapore) Young Lions FC
36	Neezam Aziz	(Singapore)	25 April 1991 (age 34)	Youth Team
40	Nur Azreen Azman	(Singapore)	18 January 1989 (age 37)	Youth Team
Defenders
3	Kenji Arai	(Japan)	19 May 1978 (age 47)	(Singapore) Sengkang Punggol
4	Juma'at Jantan	(Singapore)	23 February 1984 (age 42)	(Singapore) Young Lions FC
13	Valery Hiek	(Cameroon)	31 January 1981 (age 45)	(Cameroon) Cercle Sportif de Yaoundel
14	Rosman Sulaiman	(Singapore)	6 November 1982 (age 43)	(Singapore) Young Lions FC
23	Zulfadli Zainal Abidin	(Singapore)	26 April 1988 (age 37)	(Singapore) SAFFC
35	Shahir Hamzah	(Singapore)	7 April 1989 (age 36)	(Singapore) Sengkang Punggol
38	Abdil Qaiyyim Mutalib	(Singapore)	14 May 1988 (age 37)	Youth Team
Midfielders
2	Farizal Basri	(Singapore)	4 September 1981 (age 44)	(Singapore) Sengkang Punggol
7	Shi Jiayi	(Singapore) (China)	8 November 1993 (age 32)	(Singapore) Young Lions FC
8	Nor Azli Yusoff	(Singapore)	29 April 1983 (age 42)	(Singapore) Sengkang Punggol
11	Isa Halim	(Singapore)	15 May 1986 (age 39)	(Singapore) Young Lions FC
12	Firdaus Idros	(Singapore)	12 August 1986 (age 39)	(Singapore) Young Lions FC
15	Asraf Rashid	(Singapore)	27 August 1985 (age 40)	(Singapore) Woodlands Wellington
20	Faizal Samad	(Singapore)	6 August 1987 (age 38)	Youth Team
22	Khairul Anwar	(Singapore)	4 December 1988 (age 37)	Youth Team
24	Firdaus Kasman	(Singapore)	24 January 1988 (age 38)	(Singapore) Tampines Rovers
Strikers
5	Masrezwan Masturi	(Singapore)	17 February 1981 (age 45)	(Singapore) Tanjong Pagar United
6	Lee Sang-ha	(South Korea)	19 April 1985 (age 40)	(South Korea) Suwon Samsung Bluewings
9	Kim Dae-eui	(South Korea)	30 May 1974 (age 51)	(South Korea) Suwon Samsung Bluewings
10	Frédéric Mendy	(Guinea-Bissau) (France)	18 September 1988 (age 37)	(Singapore) Étoile FC
16	Qiu Li	(Singapore) (China)	6 June 1981 (age 44)	(Singapore) Tampines Rovers
19	Sufian Anuar	(Singapore)	28 June 1987 (age 38)	(Singapore) Young Lions FC
21	Sherif El-Masri	(Canada)	5 February 1990 (age 36)	(France) FC Rouen
Player who left during mid season
6	Shahril Alias	(Singapore)	14 May 1984 (age 41)	Youth Team

== Transfers ==
=== Pre-season transfers ===
==== In ====
Position	Player	Transferred From	Ref
GK	(Singapore) Siddiq Durimi	(Singapore) Geylang International	
GK	(Singapore) Fajar Sarib	(Singapore) Woodlands Wellington	
DF	(Japan) Kenji Arai	(Singapore) Sengkang Punggol	
DF	(Singapore) Shahir Hamzah	(Singapore) Sengkang Punggol	
MF	(Singapore) Nor Azli Yusoff	(Singapore) Sengkang Punngol	
MF	(Singapore) Farizal Basri	(Singapore) Sengkang Punngol	
FW	(Singapore) Masrezwan Masturi	(Singapore) Geylang United	
FW	(South Korea) Lee Sang-ha	(South Korea) Suwon Samsung Bluewings	
FW	(South Korea) Kim Dae-eui	(South Korea) Suwon Samsung Bluewings	
FW	(Guinea-Bissau) (France) Frédéric Mendy	(Singapore) Etoile FC	
FW	(Singapore) (China) Qiu Li	(Singapore) Tampines Rovers	

==== Out ====
Position	Player	Transferred From	Ref
GK	(Singapore) Ridzuan Fatah Hasan	(Singapore) Hougang United	
GK	(Singapore) Nazri Sabri	(Singapore) Geylang United	
MF	(Singapore) Shahril Ishak	(Indonesia) Persib Bandung	
MF	(South Korea) Chun Jae-Woon	(South Korea)	
FW	(South Korea) Choi Chul-woo	(South Korea)	
FW	(South Korea) An Hyo-yeon	(Indonesia) Persela Lamongan	

=== Mid-season transfers ===
==== In ====
Position	Player	Transferred From	Ref
MF	(Singapore) Justin Khiang	(Singapore) Tanjong Pagar United	National Service

==== Out ====
Position	Player	Transferred From	Ref
DF	(Singapore) Shahril Alias	(Singapore) Hougang United	

== Team statistics ==
=== Appearances and goals ===
Numbers in parentheses denote appearances as substitute.

No.	Pos.	Player	Sleague		Singapore Cup		League Cup		Total	
No.	Pos.	Player	Apps.	Goals	Apps.	Goals	Apps.	Goals	Apps.	Goals
2	MF	(Singapore) Farizal Basri	6	0	0	0	1	0	7	0
3	DF	(Japan) Kenji Arai	31	1	6	0	1	0	38	1
4	DF	(Singapore) Juma'at Jantan	31	1	6	0	0	0	37	1
5	FW	(Singapore) Masrezwan Masturi	16	4	4	0	1	0	21	4
6	FW	(South Korea) Lee Sang-ha	1	0	0	0	1	0	2	0
7	MF	(Singapore) (China) Shi Jiayi	31	7	5	0	0	0	36	7
8	MF	(Singapore) Nor Azli Yusoff	19	0	5	0	1	0	25	0
9	FW	(South Korea) Kim Dae-eui	14	1	1	0	0	0	15	1
10	FW	(Guinea-Bissau) (France) Frédéric Mendy	31	21	5	4	1	0	37	25
11	MF	(Singapore) Isa Halim	27	0	6	0	0	0	33	0
12	MF	(Singapore) Firdaus Idros	31	10	5	1	1	0	37	11
13	DF	(Cameroon) Valery Hiek	33	5	6	0	1	0	40	5
14	DF	(Singapore) Rosman Sulaiman	24	0	5	0	1	0	30	0
15	MF	(Singapore) Asraf Rashid	19	3	1	1	0	0	20	4
16	FW	(Singapore) (China) Qiu Li	23	17	4	3	0	0	27	21
17	GK	(Singapore) Fajar Sarib	8	0	0	0	1	0	9	0
18	GK	(Singapore) Lionel Lewis	28	0	6	0	0	0	34	0
19	FW	(Singapore) Sufian Anuar	19	2	5	0	1	0	25	2
20	MF	(Singapore) Faizal Samad	7	0	1	0	1	0	9	0
21	FW	(Guyana) (Canada) Sherif El-Masri	14	4	5	1	0	0	19	5
22	MF	(Singapore) Khairul Anwar	1	0	0	0	0	0	1	0
23	DF	(Singapore) Zulfadli Zainal Abidin	4	0	2	0	1	1	7	1
24	MF	(Singapore) Firdaus Kasman	17	1	0	0	0	0	17	1
35	MF	(Singapore) Yasir Hanapi	6	1	1	0	0	0	7	1
38	DF	(Singapore) Abdil Qaiyyim	11	0	2	0	1	0	14	0
39	MF	(Singapore) Zulkifli Suzliman	1	0	0	0	0	0	1	0
Players who have played this season and/or sign for the season but had left the club or on loan to other club
6	DF	(Singapore) Shahril Alias	10	0	0	0	0	0	10	0

== Competitions ==
=== S.League ===
==== League table ====
Pos	Team	Pld	W	D	L	GF	GA	GD	Pts	Qualification
1	Tampines Rovers	33	25	3	5	71	25	+46	78	Qualification to AFC Cup Group Stage
2	Home United	33	25	2	6	81	29	+52	77	Qualification to AFC Cup Group Stage (Note: Qualified as 2011 Singapore Cup winners.)
3	Singapore Armed Forces	33	21	3	9	74	39	+35	66	
4	Albirex Niigata (S)	33	20	5	8	80	34	+46	65	
5	Étoile	33	21	4	8	65	36	+29	62 (Note: Étoile and Hougang United were deducted five points each for gross misconduct and bringing the game into disrepute which led to their match on 23 May 2011 being called off before kick-off.)	

Source: RSSSF
Rules for classification: 1) points; 2) goal difference; 3) number of goals scored; 4) number of wins

=== Singapore Cup ===
==== Preliminary round ====
14 June 2011	Home United	5–1	Woodlands Wellington	Bishan Stadium
19:30	Firdaus Idros 28'; Kenji Arai 40'; Asraf Rashid 65'; Qiu Li 80' 86'		Adrian Butters 67'	Attendance: 1,222; Referee: W Ravisanthiran

==== Quarter Final ====
August 14, 2011 Leg 1	Tampines Rovers	3–3	Home United	Tampines Stadium
20:00	Aleksandar Duric 49', (Pen.) 80', 88'		Frederic Mendy 19', 55'; Qiu Li 90'	Attendance: 1,160; Referee: Sukhbir Singh

August 18, 2011 Leg 2	Home United	0–0 (3–3 agg.) (4–2 p)	Tampines Rovers	Bishan Stadium
20:00				Attendance: 1,306; Referee: Leow Thiam Hoe
	Penalties
	Qiu Li (penalty scored); Shi Jiayi (penalty scored); Kenji Arai (penalty scored); Rosman Sulaiman (penalty scored)		(penalty missed) Akihiro Nakamura; (penalty scored) Seiji Kaneko; (penalty missed) Aleksandar Đurić; (penalty scored) Benoît Croissant

==== Semi Final ====
September 19, 2011 Leg 1	Home United	1–1	(France) Etoile FC	Bishan Stadium
20:00

September 22, 2011 Leg 2	Etoile FC (France)	0–1 (1–2 agg.)	Home United	Queenstown Stadium
20:00			Mendy 55'

==== Final ====
November 19, 2011	Home United	1–0 (a.e.t.)	(Japan) Albirex Niigata (S)

=== Singapore League Cup ===
21 July 2011 Quarter final	Etoile FC (France)	1 – 1 (aet) (5–6 p)	Home United	Queenstown Stadium
19:30	Maxime Belouet (Pen) 6'	Preview; Details; Report	Zulfadli Zainal Abidin (Pen) 19'	Attendance: 995; Referee: Abdul Malik
	Penalties
	Hicham Bouchemlal (penalty missed); Wilson Grosset (penalty scored); Aly Doumbouya (penalty scored); Theo Raymond (penalty scored); Selim Kaabi (penalty scored); Jonathan Toto (penalty missed); Nordine Talhi (penalty scored); Julien Durand (penalty missed); Antonin Trilles (penalty missed)		(penalty missed) Kenji Arai; (penalty scored) Valery Hiek; (penalty scored) Rosman Sulaiman; (penalty scored) Zulfadli Zainal Abidin; (penalty scored) Frederic Mendy; (penalty missed) Lee Sang Ha; (penalty scored) Nor Azli Yusoff; (penalty missed) Sufian Anuar; (penalty scored) Firdaus Idros

26 July 2011 Semi final	Home United	0–1	Hougang United	Bishan Stadium
19:30		Preview; Details; Report	Noor Ali 19'	Attendance: 1,558; Referee: Muhd Taqi
