= 2011 Singapore League Cup =

Tournament details
- Country: Singapore
- Teams: 11

Final positions
- Champions: Albirex Niigata (S)
- Runners-up: Hougang United
- Third place: Tampines Rovers

The 2011 Singapore League Cup was held between 19 and 30 July. The draw was held on Friday, 1 July 2011 in Singapore. The matches were played on a one match basis.

The Young Lions opted out of participation in view of their impending involvement in the inaugural AFF Under-23 tournament in Indonesia during the period of the competition.

== Scoreline ==
Number in () denotes the final score for penalty shootout.
Number in {} denotes the final score at extra time (AET)

Preliminary stage
1	(France) Etoile FC
16	--Bye--
9	Home United
8	--Bye--
5	SAFFC
12	--Bye--
13	Woodlands Wellington	0
4	Hougang United	2
3	Tanjong Pagar United	1
14	(Japan) Albirex Niigata (S)	3
11	Geylang United
6	--Bye--
7	Tampines Rovers
10	--Bye--
15	Gombak United	2
2	Balestier Khalsa	0

Quarter-Finals
(France) Etoile FC	1 (5)
Home United	1 (6)
SAFFC	1 {1}
Hougang United	1 {2}
(Japan) Albirex Niigata (S)	1 {3}
Geylang United	1 {1}
Tampines Rovers	2
Gombak United	1

Semi-Finals
Home United	0
Hougang United	1
(Japan) Albirex Niigata (S)	1 (6)
Tampines Rovers	1 (5)

Final
(Japan) Albirex Niigata (S)	0 (5)
Hougang United	0 (4)
Third place
Tampines Rovers	0 {3}
Home United	0 {1}

== Preliminary stage ==
The winners advanced to the quarter-final stage.

19 July 2011
19:30

Woodlands Wellington	0 - 2	Hougang United
	Preview; Details; Report	Fazli Jaffar 21'; Vitor Borges 73'

Woodlands Stadium
Attendance: 911
Referee: K Kalimuthu

19 July 2011
19:30

Tanjong Pagar United	1 - 3	(Japan) Albirex Niigata (S)
Takaya Kawanabe 66'	Preview; Details; Report	Shimpei Sakurada 53'; Kazuki Kobayashi 78'; Bruno Castanheira 85'

Clementi Stadium
Attendance: 981
Referee: Johan Jahari

20 July 2011
19:30

Gombak United	2 - 0	Balestier Khalsa
Jung Hee Bong 16'; Chang Jo Yoon 72'	Preview; Details; Report

Jurong West Stadium
Attendance: 1,369
Referee: Abas Daud

== Quarter-final stage ==
21 July 2011
19:30

Etoile FC (France)	1 – 1 (aet)	Home United
Maxime Belouet (Pen) 6'	Preview; Details; Report	Zulfadli Zainal Abidin (Pen) 19'
Penalties
Hicham Bouchemlal (penalty missed); Wilson Grosset (penalty scored); Aly Doumbouya (penalty scored); Theo Raymond (penalty scored); Selim Kaabi (penalty scored); Jonathan Toto (penalty missed); Nordine Talhi (penalty scored); Julien Durand (penalty missed); Antonin Trilles (penalty missed)	5 – 6	(penalty missed) Kenji Arai; (penalty scored) Valery Hiek; (penalty scored) Rosman Sulaiman; (penalty scored) Zulfadli Zainal Abidin; (penalty scored) Frederic Mendy; (penalty missed) Lee Sang Ha; (penalty scored) Nor Azli Yusoff; (penalty missed) Sufian Anuar; (penalty scored) Firdaus Idros

Queenstown Stadium
Attendance: 995
Referee: Abdul Malik

22 July 2011
19:30

SAFFC	1 – 2 (aet)	Hougang United
Indra Sahdan 36'	Preview; Details; Report	Jordan Webb 53'; Basit Hamid 102'

Choa Chu Kang Stadium
Attendance: 1,339
Referee: Leow Thiam Hoe

24 July 2011
19:30

Albirex Niigata (Japan)	3 – 1 (aet)	Geylang United
Shuhei Hotta 87'; Bruno Castanheira 105'; Bruno Castanheira 115'	Preview; Details; Report	Yuta Nakano 4'

Jurong East Stadium
Attendance: 1,265
Referee: Muhd Taqi

24 July 2011
19:30

Tampines	2 - 1	Gombak United
Jamil Ali 64'; Ahmed Fahmie 68'	Preview; Details; Report	Jufri Taha (o.g) 85'

Tampines Stadium
Attendance: Sukhbir Singh
Referee: 1,177

== Semi-final stage ==
26 July 2011
19:30

Home United	0 - 1	Hougang United
	Preview; Details; Report	Noor Ali 19'

Bishan Stadium
Attendance: 1,558
Referee: Muhd Taqi

27 July 2011
19:30

Albirex Niigata (Japan)	1 – 1 (a.e.t.)	Tampines Rovers
Norihiro Kawakami 76'	Preview; Details; Report	Ahmed Fahmie 40'
Penalties
Tatsuro Inui (penalty scored); Shimpei Sakurada (penalty scored); Kazuki Kobayashi (penalty scored); Ryuta Hayashi (penalty missed); Bruno Castanheira (penalty missed); Shotaro Ihata (penalty missed); Musashi Okuyama (penalty scored); Shuhei Hotta (penalty missed)	6 – 5	(penalty scored) Akihiro Nakamura; (penalty scored) Seiji Kaneko; (penalty scored) Firdaus Kasman; (penalty missed) Ahmad Latiff; (penalty missed) Imran Sahib; (penalty scored) Benoit Croissant; (penalty scored) Ismadi Mukhtar; (penalty missed) Jufri Taha

Jurong East Stadium
Attendance: 1,195
Referee: K Kalimuthu

== 3rd-place playoff ==
30 July 2011
17:00

Tampines Rovers	0 – 0 (aet)	Home United
	Preview; Details; Report
Penalties
Akihiro Nakamura (penalty scored); Seiji Kaneko (penalty scored); Firdaus Kasman (penalty scored); Shukor Zailan (penalty missed)	3 – 1	(penalty missed) Valery Hiek; (penalty scored) Sherif El-Masri; (penalty missed) Rosman Sulaiman; (penalty missed) Frederic Mendy

Jalan Besar Stadium
Attendance: 1,274
Referee: Sukhbir Singh

== Final ==
30 July 2011
19:30

Albirex Niigata (Japan)	0 – 0 (a.e.t.)	Hougang United
	Preview; Details; Report; Reaction
Penalties
Tatsuro Inui (penalty scored); Shimpei Sakurada (penalty scored); Kazuki Kobayashi (penalty scored); Yosuke Saito (penalty scored); Shotaro Ihata (penalty scored)	5 – 4	(penalty scored) Noor Ali; (penalty scored) Carlos Delgado; (penalty scored) Vitor Borges; (penalty scored) Fathi Yunus; (penalty missed) Jordan Webb

Jalan Besar Stadium
Attendance: 2,259
Referee: Abas Daud

== See also ==
- S.League
- Singapore Cup
- Singapore Charity Shield
- Football Association of Singapore
- List of football clubs in Singapore
