= 2010 Home United FC season =

Home United FC
- Chairman: Koh Siong Ling
- Manager: Lee Lim-Saeng
- S.League: –
| Home colours | Away colours |

Home United competed in the 2010 S.League.

== Squad ==
=== S.League squad ===
| Squad No. | Name | Nationality | Date of Birth (Age) | Last Club |
Goalkeepers
| 18 | Lionel Lewis | (Singapore) | 16 December 1982 (age 43) | (Singapore) Young Lions FC |
| | Ridzuan Fatah Hasan | (Singapore) | 2 October 1981 (age 45) | Youth Team |
| | Nazri Sabri | (Singapore) | 20 September 1989 (age 37) | Youth Team |
Defenders
| 4 | Juma'at Jantan | (Singapore) | 23 February 1984 (age 42) | (Singapore) Young Lions FC |
| 6 | Shahril Alias | (Singapore) | 14 May 1984 (age 42) | Youth Team |
| 13 | Valery Hiek | (Cameroon) | 31 January 1981 (age 45) | (Cameroon) Cercle Sportif de Yaoundel |
| 14 | Rosman Sulaiman | (Singapore) | 6 November 1982 (age 44) | (Singapore) Young Lions FC |
| 23 | Zulfadli Zainal Abidin | (Singapore) | 26 April 1988 (age 38) | (Singapore) SAFFC |
| | Shariff Abdul Samat | (Singapore) | 5 January 1984 (age 42) | (Singapore) Tampines Rovers |
| | Ismail Yunos | (Singapore) | 24 October 1986 (age 40) | (Singapore) Young Lions FC |
Midfielders
| 7 | Shi Jiayi | (Singapore) (China) | 8 November 1993 (age 33) | (Singapore) Young Lions FC |
| 11 | Isa Halim | (Singapore) | 15 May 1986 (age 40) | (Singapore) Young Lions FC |
| 12 | Firdaus Idros | (Singapore) | 12 August 1986 (age 40) | (Singapore) Young Lions FC |
| 20 | Faizal Samad | (Singapore) | 6 August 1987 (age 39) | Youth Team |
| 24 | Firdaus Kasman | (Singapore) | 24 January 1988 (age 38) | (Singapore) Tampines Rovers |
| | Chun Jae-Woon | (South Korea) | 18 March 1981 (age 45) | (South Korea) Jeju United |
| | Shahdan Sulaiman | (Singapore) | 9 May 1988 (age 38) | (Singapore) Tampines Rovers |
Strikers
| 17 | Shahril Ishak | (Singapore) | 23 January 1984 (age 42) | (Singapore) Young Lions FC |
| 19 | Sufian Anuar | (Singapore) | 28 June 1987 (age 39) | (Singapore) Young Lions FC |
| 21 | Sherif El-Masri | (Canada) | 5 February 1990 (age 36) | (France) FC Rouen |
| | Choi Chul-woo | (South Korea) | 30 November 1977 (age 48) | (South Korea) Ulsan Hyundai Mipo Dockyard |
| | An Hyo-yeon | (South Korea) | 16 April 1987 (age 39) | (Japan) Yokohama FC |
Player who left during mid season
| | Nelson San Martín | (Chile) | 17 May 1980 (age 46) | (Thailand) Bangkok Glass FC |

== Transfers ==
=== Pre-season transfers ===
==== In ====
| Position | Player | Transferred From | Ref |
|---|---|---|---|
| GK | (Singapore) Nazri Sabri | (Singapore) N.A. | |
| DF | (Singapore) Zulfadli Zainal Abidin | (Singapore) SAFFC | |
| DF | (Singapore) Shariff Abdul Samat | (Singapore) Tampines Rovers | |
| MF | (Singapore) Firdaus Kasman | (Singapore) Tampines Rovers | |
| MF | (Singapore) Faizal Samad | (Singapore) | |
| MF | (South Korea) Chun Jae-Woon | (South Korea) Jeju United | |
| FW | (South Korea) Choi Chul-woo | (South Korea) Ulsan Hyundai Mipo Dockyard | |
| FW | (South Korea) An Hyo-yeon | (Japan) Yokohama FC | |

==== Out ====
| Position | Player | Transferred From | Ref |

=== Mid-season transfers ===
==== In ====
| Position | Player | Transferred From | Ref |

==== Out ====
| Position | Player | Transferred From | Ref |
|---|---|---|---|
| FW | (Chile) Nelson San Martín | (Chile) A.C. Barnechea | |

== Team statistics ==
=== Appearances and goals ===
As of 22 Nov 26

| No. | Pos. | Player | Singapore Premier League | | Singapore Cup | | Community Shield | | AFC Champions League Two | | ASEAN Club Championship | | Total | |
| No. | Pos. | Player | Apps. | Goals | Apps. | Goals | Apps. | Goals | Apps. | Goals | Apps. | Goals | Apps. | Goals |
|---|---|---|---|---|---|---|---|---|---|---|---|---|---|---|
| 1 | GK | (Brazil) Victor Aznar | 3 | 0 | 0 | 0 | 1 | 0 | 4 | 0 | 1 | 0 | 9 | 0 |
| 2 | DF | (Georgia (country)) (Portugal) Jorge Karseladze | 3+2 | 0 | 0 | 0 | 0+1 | 0 | 4 | 0 | 0 | 0 | 10 | 0 |
| 3 | DF | (Brazil) Hugo Gomes | 2+1 | 2 | 0 | 0 | 1 | 0 | 4 | 1 | 0 | 0 | 8 | 3 |
| 4 | DF | (Croatia) Toni Datković | 3+1 | 1 | 0 | 0 | 1 | 0 | 3 | 0 | 1 | 0 | 9 | 1 |
| 5 | DF | (Singapore) Lionel Tan | 4+1 | 0 | 0 | 0 | 0 | 0 | 0 | 0 | 0 | 0 | 5 | 0 |
| 6 | MF | (Cameroon) (Germany) Tsiy-William Ndenge | 0 | 0 | 0 | 0 | 0 | 0 | 0 | 0 | 0 | 0 | 0 | 0 |
| 7 | FW | (Singapore) Shawal Anuar | 1+3 | 2 | 0 | 0 | 0 | 0 | 0+2 | 0 | 0 | 0 | 6 | 2 |
| 8 | MF | (Singapore) (Japan) Kyoga Nakamura | 4+1 | 0 | 0 | 0 | 1 | 0 | 2+2 | 1 | 1 | 0 | 11 | 1 |
| 9 | FW | (Germany) Lennart Thy | 1+1 | 3 | 0 | 0 | 0 | 0 | 1+1 | 1 | 0 | 0 | 4 | 4 |
| 10 | MF | (Netherlands) Bart Ramselaar | 4+1 | 1 | 0 | 0 | 1 | 0 | 4 | 0 | 0+1 | 0 | 11 | 1 |
| 11 | FW | (Singapore) Glenn Kweh | 1+1 | 0 | 0 | 0 | 0+1 | 0 | 0+1 | 0 | 0 | 0 | 4 | 0 |
| 12 | FW | (Croatia) Antonio Mance | 3+2 | 4 | 0 | 0 | 0+1 | 0 | 2+1 | 0 | 1 | 0 | 10 | 4 |
| 13 | GK | (Singapore) Adib Azahari | 0 | 0 | 0 | 0 | 0 | 0 | 0 | 0 | 0 | 0 | 0 | 0 |
| 14 | MF | (Singapore) Hariss Harun | 3+2 | 1 | 0 | 0 | 0+1 | 0 | 0+2 | 0 | 1 | 0 | 9 | 1 |
| 15 | MF | (Singapore) (South Korea) Song Ui-young | 4+1 | 0 | 0 | 0 | 0+1 | 0 | 2+1 | 0 | 1 | 0 | 10 | 0 |
| 16 | MF | (Singapore) Hami Syahin | 2 | 0 | 0 | 0 | 0+1 | 0 | 0+1 | 0 | 0 | 0 | 4 | 0 |
| 17 | FW | (Singapore) (South Africa) Ilhan Fandi | 3+2 | 2 | 0 | 0 | 1 | 2 | 1+3 | 1 | 0+1 | 0 | 11 | 5 |
| 18 | DF | (Singapore) (Wales) Ryhan Stewart | 3+1 | 0 | 0 | 0 | 1 | 0 | 0+4 | 0 | 1 | 0 | 10 | 0 |
| 19 | FW | (Singapore) Farhan Zulkifli | 2+1 | 0 | 0 | 0 | 1 | 0 | 1 | 0 | 0 | 0 | 5 | 0 |
| 20 | DF | (Singapore) Nur Adam Abdullah | 1 | 0 | 0 | 0 | 0 | 0 | 0 | 0 | 0+1 | 0 | 2 | 0 |
| 21 | FW | (Singapore) (Nigeria) Abdul Rasaq | 0 | 0 | 0 | 0 | 0 | 0 | 0 | 0 | 0+1 | 0 | 1 | 0 |
| 22 | MF | (Singapore) Nur Muhammad Asis | 0+1 | 0 | 0 | 0 | 0 | 0 | 0 | 0 | 0 | 0 | 1 | 0 |
| 23 | FW | (Guadeloupe) (France) Matthias Phaëton | 5+1 | 5 | 0 | 0 | 1 | 0 | 4 | 3 | 1 | 0 | 12 | 8 |
| 24 | MF | (France) (Italy) Giovanni Haag | 3+3 | 2 | 0 | 0 | 1 | 0 | 4 | 0 | 1 | 0 | 12 | 2 |
| 25 | GK | (Croatia) Ivan Sušak | 3 | 0 | 0 | 0 | 0 | 0 | 0 | 0 | 0 | 0 | 3 | 0 |
| 26 | DF | (Australia) Bailey Wright | 4+1 | 1 | 0 | 0 | 0 | 0 | 3 | 1 | 1 | 0 | 9 | 2 |
| 29 | DF | (Portugal) Diogo Costa | 4+1 | 0 | 0 | 0 | 1 | 0 | 4 | 0 | 1 | 0 | 11 | 0 |
| 30 | FW | (Netherlands) (Nigeria) Bobby Adekanye | 0+1 | 1 | 0 | 0 | 0+1 | 0 | 0 | 0 | 0+1 | 0 | 3 | 1 |
Players who have played this season but had left the club on loan to other club
Players who have played this season but had left the club

== Competitions ==
=== S.League ===
==== League table ====
| Pos | Team | Pld | W | D | L | GF | GA | GD | Pts | Qualification |
|---|---|---|---|---|---|---|---|---|---|---|
| 1 | Étoile FC | 33 | 21 | 7 | 5 | 54 | 23 | +31 | 70 | |
| 2 | Tampines Rovers | 33 | 21 | 6 | 6 | 68 | 30 | +38 | 69 | Qualification to AFC Cup Group Stage (Note: The three foreign clubs – Albirex Niigata (S), Beijing Guoan Talent and Étoile – as well as the Football Association of Singapore under-23 team, Young Lions, were not eligible for qualification to continental competitions. The FAS withdrew their one allocated AFC Champions League qualifying round spot. Tampines Rovers qualified for the 2011 AFC Cup as league runners-up.) |
| 3 | Home United | 33 | 18 | 11 | 4 | 55 | 31 | +24 | 65 | |
| 4 | Singapore Armed Forces | 33 | 16 | 5 | 12 | 56 | 41 | +15 | 53 | |
| 5 | Geylang United | 33 | 12 | 11 | 10 | 32 | 30 | +2 | 47 | |

Source: RSSSF
Rules for classification: 1) points; 2) goal difference; 3) number of goals scored; 4) number of wins
Notes:

| 4 February 2010 1 | Albirex Niigata (S) | 1–2 | Home United | Jurong East Stadium |
| 19:45 | Ken Matsumoto 83' | Preview; Details; Report | Juma'at Jantan 69'; Shahril Ishak 85' | Attendance: 1,412; Referee: W Ravisanthiran |

| 9 February 2010 2 | Home United | 2–2 | Young Lions | Clementi Stadium |
| 19:45 | Shahril Ishak 1'; Valery Hiek 90' | Preview; Details; Report | Fazli Ayob 37'; Luka Savic 39' (pen.) | Attendance: 2,538; Referee: Zaid Hussein |

| 14 March 2010 3 | Home United | 3–3 | Etoile FC | Clementi Stadium |
| 19:45 | Choi Chul Woo 43'; Sherif El-Masri 68'; Zulfadli Zainal Abidin 81' | Preview; Details; Report | Frederic Mendy 2'; Matthias Verschave 37'; Karim Boudjema 45' | Attendance: 1,728; Referee: Abdul Malik |

| 19 March 2010 4 | Beijing Guoan Talent | 4–1 | Home United | Jalan Besar Stadium |
| 19:30 | Tengku Mushadad 43' (o.g.); Liu Teng 71'; Zhang Xizhe 89'; Wang Hao 90' | Preview; Details; Report | Shi Jiayi 16' | Attendance: 1,924; Referee: K Kalimuthu |

| 22 March 2010 5 | Woodlands Wellington | 2–2 | Home United | Woodlands Stadium |
| 19:45 | Abdelhadi Laakkad 73'; Kazuki Yoshino 89' | Preview; Details; Report | Nelson San Martin 16'; Choi Chul Woo 48' | Attendance: 1,941; Referee: Abdul Malik |

| 26 March 2010 6 | Home United | 2–1 | Sengkang Punggol | Jalan Besar Stadium |
| 19:30 | Choi Chul Woo 39'; Valery Hiek 78' | Preview; Details; Report | Farizal Basri 79' | Attendance: 2,326; Referee: Muhd Taqi |

| 1 April 2010 7 | Home United | 3–0 | Geylang United | Clementi Stadium |
| 19:45 | Shi Jiayi 7'; Choi Chul Woo 33'; Shahril Ishak 83' | Preview; Details; Report | | Attendance: 1,032; Referee: Leow Thiam Hoe |

| 9 April 2010 8 | Tampines Rovers | 0–0 | Home United | Jalan Besar Stadium |
| 19:30 | | Preview; Details; Report | | Attendance: 2,468; Referee: Abdul Malik |

| 14 April 2010 9 | Home United | 2–2 | Balestier Khalsa | Clementi Stadium |
| 19:45 | Shi Jiayi 18'; Azhar Sairudin 33' | Preview; Details; Report | Vitor Borges 30'; Rivaldo Costa 34' | Attendance: 1,206; Referee: Zaid Hussein |

| 21 April 2010 10 | Gombak United | 1–0 | Home United | Jalan Besar Stadium |
| 19:30 | Fazrul Nawaz 50' | Preview; Details; Report | | Attendance: 1,879; Referee: Muhd Taqi |

| 30 April 2010 11 | Home United | 1–0 | Albirex Niigata | Jalan Besar Stadium |
| 19:30 | Shi Jiayi 10' (pen.) | Preview; Details; Report | | Attendance: 2,012; Referee: Zaid Hussein |

| 6 May 2010 12 | Home United | 1–1 | SAFFC | Clementi Stadium |
| 19:45 | Shahril Ishak 8' | Preview; Details; Report | Federico Martinez 14' (pen.) | Attendance: 1,331; Referee: P Pandian |

| 13 May 2010 13 | Young Lions | 2–1 | Home United | Jalan Besar Stadium |
| 19:45 | Hafiz Abu Sujad 52'; Shahfiq Ghani 86' | Preview; Details; Report | Choi Chul Woo 17' | Attendance: 2,168; Referee: Zaid Hussein |

| 19 May 2010 14 | Home United | 3–2 | Beijing Guoan Talent | Jalan Besar Stadium |
| 19:30 | Shi Jiayi 12'; Shahril Ishak 38', 82' | Preview; Details; Report | Tan Tiancheng 64', 74' | Attendance: 2,027; Referee: Sukhbir Singh |

| 2 June 2010 15 | Etoile FC | 1–0 | Home United | Jalan Besar Stadium |
| 19:30 | Frédéric Mendy 74' | Preview; Details; Report | | Attendance: 1,908; Referee: Abdul Malik |

| 8 June 2010 16 | Home United | 2–0 | Woodlands Wellington | Clementi Stadium |
| 19:45 | Shi Jiayi 35'; Sufian Anuar 86' | Preview; Details; Report | | Attendance: 1,249; Referee: Zaid Hussein |

| 14 June 2010 17 | Sengkang Punggol | 0–1 | Home United | Hougang Stadium |
| 19:30 | | Preview; Details; Report | Chun Jae Woon 90' (pen.) | Attendance: 863; Referee: Sukhbir Singh |

| 19 June 2010 18 | Geylang United | 0–3 | Home United | Bedok Stadium |
| 19:30 | | Preview; Details; Report | Shahril Ishak 8' (pen.), 22', 69' | Attendance: 932; Referee: K Kalimuthu |

| 28 June 2010 19 | Home United | 1–0 | Tampines Rovers | Clementi Stadium |
| 19:30 | Ismail Yunos 47' | Preview; Details; Report | | Attendance: 1,454; Referee: Sukhbir Singh |

| 1 July 2010 20 | Balestier Khalsa | 0–1 | Home United | Toa Payoh Stadium |
| 19:30 | | Preview; Details; Report | Chun Jae Woon 86' | Attendance: 903; Referee: W Ravisanthiran |

| 5 July 2010 21 | Home United | 2–0 | Gombak United | Clementi Stadium |
| 19:30 | Shi Jiayi 9'; Jun Woo Keun 50' | Preview; Details; Report | | Attendance: 1,528; Referee: Sukhbir Singh |

| 12 July 2010 22 | Albirex Niigata (S) | 2–2 | Home United | Jurong East Stadium |
| 19:45 | Takaya Sugasawa 21', 90' | Preview; Details; Report | Shi Jiayi 79'; Shahril Ishak 90' | Attendance: 1,448; Referee: K Kalimuthu |

| 16 July 2010 23 | SAFFC | 2–5 | Home United | Jalan Besar Stadium |
| 19:30 | John Wilkinson 53'; Park Tae Won 66' | Preview; Details; Report | Ishak 9', 40', 63'; Jun Woo Keun 46'; Sulaiman 90' | Attendance: 1,923; Referee: Abdul Malik |

| 29 July 2010 24 | Home United | 2–1 | Young Lions | Clementi Stadium |
| 19:45 | Anuar 68', 70' | Preview; Details; Report | Ramli 50' | Attendance: 1,513; Referee: Abdul Malik |

| 2 August 2010 25 | Beijing Guoan Talent | 0–3 | Home United | Yishun Stadium |
| 19:45 | | Preview; Details; Report | Shi Jiayi 20'; Ishak 40'; Jun Woo Keun 89' | Attendance: 954; Referee: Leow Thiam Hoe |

| 31 August 2010 26 | Woodlands Wellington | 1–2 | Home United | Woodlands Stadium |
| 19:45 | Rizawan Abdullah 40' | Preview; Details; Report | Shahril Ishak 6'; Choi Chul Woo 60' | Attendance: 1,010; Referee: Sukhbir Singh |

| 3 September 2010 27 | Home United | 1–0 | Etoile FC | Jalan Besar Stadium |
| 19:30 | Shahril Ishak 19' | Preview; Details; Report | | Attendance: 1,105; Referee: Abdul Malik |

| 6 September 2010 28 | Home United | 2–2 | Sengkang Punggol | Clementi Stadium |
| 19:45 | Choi Chul Woo 52'; Shi Jiayi 63' | Preview; Details; Report | Mamadou Diallo 35'; Jordan Webb 41' | Attendance: 1,004; Referee: Muhd Taqi |

| 14 September 2010 29 | Home United | 1–0 | Geylang United | Clementi Stadium |
| 19:45 | Chun Jae Woon 19' | Preview; Details; Report | | Attendance: 1,117; Referee: Leow Thiam Hoe |

| 21 September 2010 30 | Tampines Rovers | 0–3 | Home United | Tampines Stadium |
| 19:45 | | Preview; Details | Jean Woo-Keun 37'; Shahril Ishak 43'; Sufian Anuar 68' | Attendance: 1,575; Referee: Abas Daud |

| 7 October 2010 31 | Home United | 0–0 | Balestier Khalsa | Clementi Stadium |
| 19:45 | | Preview; Details; Report | | Attendance: 1,100; Referee: Leow Thiam Hoe |

| 22 October 2010 32 | Gombak United | 1–1 | Home United | Jalan Besar Stadium |
| 19:45 | Jeremy Chiang 62' | Preview; Details; Report | Shi Jiayi 45' | Attendance: 847; Referee: Abas Daud |

| 10 November 2010 33 | Home United | 0–0 | SAFFC | Jalan Besar Stadium |
| 19:30 | | Preview; Details; Report | | Attendance: 1,428; Referee: Leow Thiam Hoe |

=== Singapore Cup ===
| 24 May 2010 Round 1 | Young Lions FC (Singapore) | 2–0 | Home United | Jalan Besar Stadium |
| 19:45 | Fairoz Hasan 5'; Khairul Nizam 52' | Preview; Details; Report | | Attendance: 1,821; Referee: P Pandian |

=== Singapore League Cup ===
| 25 February 2010 Round 1 | Home United | 0–1 | Gombak United | Clementi Stadium |
| 19:45 | | Report | Obadin Aikhena (Pen) 90' | Attendance: 1,329; Referee: P Pandian |
