= 2011 Singapore Cup =

Tournament details
- Country: Singapore
- Dates: June 2011 - November 2011
- Teams: 16

Final positions
- Champions: Home United
- Runners-up: (Japan) Albirex Niigata (S)

The 2011 Singapore Cup (known as the RHB Singapore Cup for sponsorship reasons) starts in June 2011. It is the 14th staging of the annual Singapore Cup tournament.

11 S.League clubs and 5 invited foreign teams play in this edition. The cup was a single-elimination tournament, with all sixteen teams playing from the first round. The first round involved one-off matches. Subsequent rounds involved ties of two legs.

The Young Lions have opted out of participation in view of their involvement in the inaugural AFF Under-23 tournament in Indonesia during the period of the competition.

Unlike previous editions, this season does not apply the away goals rule which explains despite SAFFC scored 2 away goals in the second leg during the quarter-finals against Albirex Niigata (S) that ends a 2–2 draw with its first leg held to a goalless draw stalemate, the game continues to the extra time and subsequently to penalty shootout after the deadlock was not break whereby Albirex Niigata (S) won the penalty shootout again and advances to the semi-finals. The same thing had also happened to Home United where they advanced through Semi-finals by penalties after the first leg where Home United scored a 3 away goals for a 3–3 draw while scoring no goals from either side on the second leg.

The first round kicked off in June with the final to be played on 5 November.

The cup winner were guaranteed a place in the 2012 AFC Cup.

== Teams ==
S.League Clubs

- (Japan) Albirex Niigata (S)
- Balestier Khalsa
- (France) Etoile
- Geylang United
- Gombak United
- Home United
- Hougang United
- Singapore Armed Forces (SAFFC)
- Tampines Rovers
- Tanjong Pagar United
- Woodlands Wellington

Invited Foreign Teams

- (Australia) South Melbourne
- (Thailand) Pattaya United
- (Cambodia) Phnom Penh Crown
- (Myanmar) Okktha United
- (Malaysia) Harimau Muda B^{*}

^{*} The original team to participate was Harimau Muda A, But later replaced by Harimau Muda B.

== Knockout bracket ==
Round of 16
Geylang United	1
Tampines Rovers	2
Home United	5
Woodlands Wellington	1
(France) Etoile FC	2
Tanjong Pagar United	0
Gombak United	2
Balestier Khalsa	1
SAFFC	4
(Cambodia) Phnom Penh Crown	0
(Australia) South Melbourne	0
(Japan) Albirex Niigata (S)	3
Hougang United FC	1
(Malaysia) Harimau Muda B	0
(Thailand) Pattaya United	1
(Myanmar) Okktha United	2

Quarter-finals
Tampines Rovers	3	0	3
Home United	3	0	3
(France) Etoile FC	1	3	4
Gombak United	0	1	1
SAFFC	0	2	2
(Japan) Albirex Niigata (S)	0	2	2
Hougang United	3	1	4
(Myanmar) Okktha United	0	3	3

Semi-finals
Home United	1	1	2
(France) Etoile FC	1	0	0
(Japan) Albirex Niigata (S)	2	3	5
Hougang United FC	2	2	2

Final
Home United	1
(Japan) Albirex Niigata (S)	0

== Preliminary round ==
June 10, 2011
19:30

Hougang United	1 – 0 (a.e.t.)	(Malaysia) Harimau Muda B
Mamadou Diallo 95'

Hougang Stadium
Attendance: 1,464
Referee: Sukhbir Singh

June 11, 2011
19:30

Gombak United	2 – 1	Balestier Khalsa
Zulkiffli Hassim 67'; Chang Jo Yoon 77'		Anaz Hadee 49'

Jurong West Stadium
Attendance: 1,433
Referee: Johan Jahari

June 12, 2011
19:30

South Melbourne FC (Australia)	0 – 3	(Japan) Albirex Niigata (S)
		Shotaro Ihata 22'; Atsushi Shimono 85'; Shimpei Sakurada 89'

Jalan Besar Stadium
Attendance: 889
Referee: Leow Thiam Hoe

June 13, 2011
19:30

Geylang United	1 – 2	Tampines Rovers
Vasile Ghindaru 57'		Aleksandar Duric 29'; Aliff Shafaein 89'

Bedok Stadium
Attendance: 968
Referee: Muhd Taqi

June 14, 2011
19:30

Home United	5 – 1	Woodlands Wellington
Firdaus Idros 28'; Kenji Arai 40'; Asraf Rashid 65'; Qiu Li 80' 86'		Adrian Butters 67'

Bishan Stadium
Attendance: 1,222
Referee: W Ravisanthiran

June 15, 2011
19:30

Etoile FC (France)	2 – 0	Tanjong Pagar United
Jonathan Toto 39' 84'

Queenstown Stadium
Attendance: 739
Referee: Johan Jahari

June 16, 2011
19:30

SAFFC	4 – 0	(Cambodia) Phnom Penh Crown
Erwan Gunawan 18' 45'; Indra Sahdan 21'; Fazrul Nawaz 67'

Choa Chu Kang Stadium
Attendance: 1,310
Referee: Abdul Malik

June 17, 2011
19:30

Pattaya United (Thailand)	1 – 2	(Myanmar) Okktha United
Somchai Singmanee 90'		Aung Moe 7'; Jean Roger Lappe Lappe 36'

Jalan Besar Stadium
Attendance: 1,843
Referee: Abas Daud

== Quarter-finals ==
=== 1st leg ===
August 14, 2011
20:00

Tampines Rovers	3 – 3	Home United
Aleksandar Duric 49', (Pen.) 80', 88'		Frederic Mendy 19', 55'; Qiu Li 90'

Tampines Stadium
Attendance: 1,160
Referee: Sukhbir Singh

August 14, 2011
20:00

SAFFC	0 – 0	(Japan) Albirex Niigata (S)

Choa Chu Kang Stadium
Attendance: 1,312
Referee: Muhd Taqi

August 16, 2011
20:00

Hougang United	3 – 0	(Myanmar) Okktha United
Edesio Junior (o.g) 27'; Noor Ali 71'; Jordan Webb 90'

Hougang Stadium
Attendance: 2,649
Referee: Leow Thiam Hoe

August 17, 2011
20:00

Gombak United	0 – 1	(France) Etoile FC
		Wilson Grosset 82'

Jurong West Stadium
Attendance: Sukhbir Singh
Referee: 1,323

=== 2nd leg ===
August 18, 2011
20:00

Home United	0 – 0	Tampines Rovers
Penalties
Qiu Li (penalty scored); Shi Jiayi (penalty scored); Kenji Arai (penalty scored); Rosman Sulaiman (penalty scored)	4 – 2	(penalty missed) Akihiro Nakamura; (penalty scored) Seiji Kaneko; (penalty missed) Aleksandar Đurić; (penalty scored) Benoît Croissant

Bishan Stadium
Attendance: 1,306
Referee: Leow Thiam Hoe

August 18, 2011
20:00

Albirex Niigata (S) (Japan)	2 – 2	SAFFC
Bruno Castanheira 13'; Shotaro Ihata 54'		Ivan Jerkovic 27', 76'
Penalties
Tatsuro Inui (penalty scored); Shimpei Sakurada (penalty scored); Yōsuke Saito (penalty scored); Shotaro Ihata (penalty scored); Musashi Okuyama (penalty missed); Ryuta Hayashi (penalty scored)	5 – 4	(penalty scored) Mislav Karoglan; (penalty scored) Ivan Jerkovic; (penalty missed) Daniel Bennett; (penalty scored) Taisuke Akiyoshi; (penalty scored) Fazrul Nawaz; (penalty missed) Noh Rahman

Jalan Besar Stadium
Attendance: 1,252
Referee: W Ravisanthiran

August 19, 2011
20:00

Okktha United (Myanmar)	3 – 1	Hougang United

Jalan Besar Stadium

August 20, 2011
20:00

Etoile FC (France)	3 – 1	Gombak United

Jalan Besar Stadium

== Semi-finals ==
=== 1st leg ===
September 19, 2011
20:00

Home United	1 – 1	(France) Etoile FC

Bishan Stadium

September 20, 2011
20:00

Albirex Niigata (S) (Japan)	2 – 2	Hougang United

Jurong East Stadium

=== 2nd leg ===
September 22, 2011
20:00

Etoile FC (France)	0 – 1	Home United
		Mendy 55'

Queenstown Stadium

September 23, 2011
20:00

Hougang United	2 – 3 (a.e.t.)	(Japan) Albirex Niigata (S)
Hamid 78'; Mazelan 115'		Ihata 44'; Saito 95', 117'

Hougang Stadium

== Third-place Playoff ==
November 19, 2011
17:00

Etoile FC (France)	3 – 0	Hougang United
Kamel Chaaouane 3'; Franklin Anzité 54'; Théo Raymond 68'	Preview; Details; Report

Jalan Besar Stadium
Attendance: 1,952
Referee: Sukhbir Singh

== Final ==
November 19, 2011

Home United	1 – 0 (a.e.t.)	(Japan) Albirex Niigata (S)

== Winners ==
Singapore Cup 2011 Winner

Home United
5th Singapore Cup Title
