= List of Indian football transfers winter 2012 =

The 2012 winter transfer window for Indian football transfers opened on 1 January and will close on 31 January. Additionally, players without a club may join at any time, and clubs may sign a goalkeeper on an emergency loan if they have no registered goalkeeper available.

== Transfers ==
Date	Name	Moving From	Moving to	Fee
24 November 2011	(India) Abhra Mondal	East Bengal	Pune	Loan
7 January 2012	(India) Nanjangud Manju	United Sikkim	Pune	Loan
2 January 2012	(Nepal) Rohit Chand	Unattached	HAL	Free
13 January 2012	(Scotland) Alan Gow	East Bengal	(England) Exeter City	Free
13 January 2012	(Brazil) Edmilson Marques Pardal	Royal Wahingdoh	East Bengal	Free
13 January 2012	(India) Subhashish Chowdhury	Prayag United	Mohun Bagan	Loan
13 January 2012	(India) Manish Bhargav	Mohun Bagan Academy	Mohun Bagan	Academy Product
15 January 2012	(Serbia) Alexander Sudovich	HAL	Released	
16 January 2012	(India) Renedy Singh	United Sikkim	Shillong Lajong	Free
16 January 2012	(Trinidad and Tobago) Densill Theobald	(Trinidad and Tobago) Caledonia AIA	Dempo	Free
18 January 2012	(South Korea) Park Jae-hyun	(South Korea) Yongin City	Sporting Clube de Goa	Free
19 January 2012	(Australia) Kalio Karpeh	Sporting Clube de Goa	Released	
21 January 2012	(Australia) Matthew Mayora	Southern Samity	Shillong Lajong	Free
25 January 2012	(India) Sushil Kumar Singh	United Sikkim	Shillong Lajong	Free
26 January 2012	(India) James Effiong	Free Agent	Chirag United Club Kerala	Free
27 January 2012	(India) Shahnawaz Bashir	Free Agent	Mumbai	Free
30 January 2012	(Japan) Yusuke Kato	(Japan) MIO Biwako Kusatsu	Dempo	Free
6 February 2012	(India) Chitrasen Chandam	Free Agent	Shillong Lajong	Free
14 February 2012	(Nigeria) Junior Obagbemiro	Salgaocar	Released	
15 February 2012	(France) Maxime Belouet	(Singapore) Etolie	Salgaocar	Free
15 February 2012	(Australia) Michael Matricciani	Chirag United Club Kerala	Released	
