= Hadama Bathily =

French Guianaian association footballer (born 1985)

Hamada Bathily
Personal information
- Full name: Hadama Bathily
- Date of birth: 18 June 1985 (age 41)
- Place of birth: Rouen, France
- Height: 1.85 m (6 ft 1 in)
- Position: Goalkeeper

Team information
- Current team: Etoile FC
- Number: 26

Youth career
- Football Croix de Savoie 74

Senior career*
Years	Team	Apps	(Gls)
2009 –2010	ESN		
2011	Etoile FC	2	(0)
- * Club domestic league appearances and goals as of 18 November 2011

Hadama Bathily (born 18 June 1985 in Rouen) is a French Guianaian association footballer who played for Etoile FC in the Singapore S.League. He plays as a goalkeeper.

== Career ==
Hadama Bathily signed for Etoile FC for the 2011 season. He made his debut for the club in the clash against Tanjong Pagar on September 26. in which Etoile FC ran out 6-1 winners.

== Controversy ==
Bathily was embroiled in controversy during the Match #86 clash between Etoile FC and Hougang United, in which the game was called off before kickoff due to an all-in brawl involving both squads. Both teams gave varying descriptions of how the fight occurred, however the fight is believed to have started during the pre-match warm up when an Etoile FC ball was kicked into the Hougang United warm up area. It is then claimed that Bathily entered the Hougang warm up area to retrieve the ball, where he then headbutted Hougang's assistant coach Hasrin Jailani, with no provocation. Bathily denied these reports, claiming he slapped the assistant coach because he had aimed a racist slur towards him. However, an unnamed source from Etoile claims the melee started when first-choice goalkeeper Antonin Trilles was verbally abused, and even kicked by the Hougang assistant coach.

As a result of the fracas, Basit Abdul Hamid and the Hougang assistant coach were taken to hospital, whilst Etoile players Franklin Anzite and Bathily were also taken to hospital.

After a week-long disciplinary hearing from the Football Association of Singapore, which took 5 sessions, a total of 18 1/2 hours, finally reached a verdict. Both clubs were docked 5 points each, and fined $10,000, of which $5,000 is suspended until the end of the 2011 S.League season, dependent on each clubs good behaviour. Three Hougang United members were charged with gross misconduct which brought the game into disrepute. Assistant coach Jailani was fined $1,000, charged with using vulgar language and received a 3-match touchline ban. The Hougang Captain Shariff Abdul Samat was fined $1,500 and charged with committing an act of violence upon Bathily, and received a 5-match suspension. Fathi Yunus was cleared of all charges by the tribunal.

Bathili himself was charged with committing an act of violence upon the Hougang assistant coach, was fined $2,000 and received a 7-match ban, whilst Bathili's teammate Serge Souchon-Koguia was charged with committing an assault on Hougang player Basit Abdul Hamid, fined $1,500 and received a 5-match ban.
