= Mathieu Delahaigue =

French footballer (born 1987)

Personal information
- Date of birth: 31 December 1987 (age 38)
- Place of birth: Sainte-Foy-lès-Lyon, Lyon, France
- Height: 1.78 m (5 ft 10 in)
- Position: Goalkeeper

Youth career
- F.C. Point Du Jour
- FC Sainte-Foy-lès-Lyon
- UODL Tassin

Senior career*
Years	Team	Apps	(Gls)
2006-2009	UODL Tassin		
2009-2010	US Venissieux		
2010–2011	Etoile FC	1	(0)
2011–2013	US Venissieux		
2013-2018	CS Neuville		
- * Club domestic league appearances and goals

Mathieu Delahaigue (born 31 December 1987) is a French former footballer who is last known to have played for Etoile FC.

== Career ==
=== Amateur career ===
Delahaigue is an amateur footballer who has played since 2006. He played in Ligue Rhone-Alpes of football from 2006 to 2018.

In 2007 Delahaigue was selected in the French University Football Team to play during the University World Cup of Futsal in Poland.

=== Professional career ===
Delahaigue was invited to Singapore to play for Etoile FC, a club composed entirely of Frenchmen, in 2010 by his former coach Nicolas Posetti. He accepted the offer for one year despite thinking it was a joke, becoming a second string goalkeeper. He was mostly used for friendlies, including one against the Singapore national team, the Singapore national team of U23, and cup matches. During the match for third place in the RHB cup, he was named man of the match after a 3-0 victory for his team.

Unable to conceptualize a professional career in football as he was studying to be a history teacher, Delahaigue's contract was not extended and he returned to amateur football.

Reflecting on his one-year spell in Singapore, the French goalkeeper stated that he was not used to the hot climate and that the level of football there was between the French fifth and sixth divisions. He said he would advise a young player to go there as well.
