= Doumbouya =

Doumbouya is a Guinean surname. Notable persons with this name include:

- Lonsana Doumbouya (born 1990), French-born Guinean footballer now playing in Austria, who has also played for Belgium and Scotland
- Mamady Doumbouya (born 1980), current President of Guinea and leader of the 2021 Guinean coup d'état
- Mohamed Doumbouya (born 1978), Guinean footballer
- Sekou Doumbouya (born 2000), Guinean-born French basketball player
