= Nordine Talhi =

French footballer (born 1986)

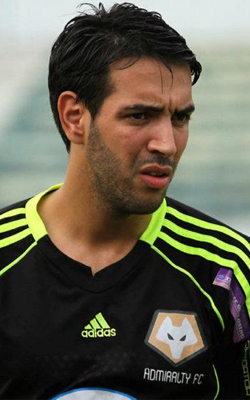
- Talhi with Admiralty FC in 2012

Personal information
- Date of birth: 22 July 1986 (age 40)
- Place of birth: Lyon, France
- Height: 1.83 m (6 ft 0 in)
- Position: Midfielder

Senior career*
Years	Team	Apps	(Gls)
2009–2010	Limonest	0	(0)
2010–2011	Étoile	33	(2)
2012	Admiralty	11	(9)
2018–	Project Vaults Oxley	0	(0)
- * Club domestic league appearances and goals

Nordine Talhi (born 22 July 1986) is a French former professional footballer who played as a midfielder or defender. He is currently playing for Singapore Football League semi-professional club Project Vaults Oxley.

== Club career ==
=== Étoile ===
In 2010, Étoile signed Talhi for the 2010 S.League season, he made 15 appearances for the clubin his first season.

Despite the majority of the team being released for the 2011 S.League season, Talhi was retained by new manager Guglielmo Arena. He scored his first goal for the club in the 3–0 victory over Tanjong Pagar United on 22 March 2011.

Talhi played mostly as a defender for Étoile, appearing 41 times and scoring 2 goals for the Stars. He was also the vice captain of Étoile for the 2011 S.League season behind team captain and goalkeeper Antonin Trilles. He left Étoile after the club's decision to pull out from the 2012 S.League to concentrate on youth development.

=== Admiralty ===
In 2012, Admiralty team manager R. Vengadasalam announced that he had signed Talhi for the 2012 season of the Singapore NFL Division 2 (now known as the Singapore Football League Division 2).

Talhi is deployed mostly as a midfielder by the Wolves and has scored 9 goals in 11 appearances so far in the 2012 season.

== Honours ==
Étoile

- S.League: 2010
- Singapore League Cup: 2010

NFL Division 2

- NFL Division 2: 2012
