= Stan Fougeroud =

French footballer (born 1991)

Personal information
- Full name: Stan Francois Jean Marc Jacques Troisne Fougeroud
- Date of birth: 19 November 1991 (age 34)
- Place of birth: France
- Position: Midfielder

Senior career*
Years	Team	Apps	(Gls)
- Toulouse FC B
- Toulouse Fontaines Club
- AS Excelsior
2010–2011	SU Agen Football		
2011	Etoile FC	10	(0)
- * Club domestic league appearances and goals

Stan Fougeroud (born 19 November 1991) is a French former footballer who is last known to have been under contract with Etoile FC of the Singaporean S.League in 2011.

== Career ==
=== Réunion ===
Parted ways with AS Excelsior of the Réunion Premier League by January 2011 along with five others.

=== Singapore ===
Roped in by Etoile FC of the Singaporean S.League for 2011, the French midfielder claimed that the standard of football there was higher, recommending it to Reunion-based footballers if the prospect of going abroad titillates them. By June that year, he parted ways with the club.

=== Romania ===
Had a failed trial with Arieșul Turda in July 2011, a month succeeding his release from Etoile.
