= Ludovic Casset =

French footballer (born 1978)

Ludovic Casset Mã Trí
Personal information
- Date of birth: 10 July 1978 (age 48)
- Place of birth: France
- Height: 1.81 m (5 ft 11 in)
- Position: Defensive midfielder

Youth career
- 1988–: FC Sens
- Auxerre

Senior career*
Years	Team	Apps	(Gls)
–2002	Auxerre II		
2003–2006	SHB Đà Nẵng		
- * Club domestic league appearances and goals

Ludovic Casset (born 10 July 1978), also known as Mã Trí, is a French former footballer who played as a defensive midfielder.

== Career ==
Casset was a youth member of FC Sens (France) and played at U15, winning the National Cup in 1994, and at U17 at the national level. At age 20, Casset injured his anterior cruciate ligament. In 2002, he signed for AJ Auxerre and played mostly with the reserve teams.

In 2004, he was invited by the Vietnam Football Federation and became the first overseas Vietnamese to train with the Vietnam national football team, ahead of the 2004 Tiger Cup. However, he could not obtain his nationality in time and was not selected for the final squad.

Shortly after training with the Vietnam national team, he received an offer from V.League 1 club SHB Đà Nẵng, where he participated in the AFC Champions League and remained until 2006. After returning to France for trials, he injured his other knee and concluded his career as a player.

Casset is now based in Singapore and, since 2012, has been the director of Étoile FC.
