= Shuhei Hotta =

Japanese footballer (born 1989)

Shuhei Hotta 堀田秀平
Personal information
- Full name: Shuhei Hotta
- Date of birth: May 12, 1989 (age 37)
- Place of birth: Matsudo, Japan
- Height: 1.81 m (5 ft 11 1/2 in)
- Position: Defender

Team information
- Current team: Nara Club
- Number: 8

Youth career
- 2002–2007: Kashiwa Reysol Youth

Senior career*
Years	Team	Apps	(Gls)
2008–2010	Consadole Sapporo	2	(0)
2011–2014	Albirex Niigata Singapore	88	(6)
2015	Songkhla United		
2015	Tokyo 23		
2016	Blaublitz Akita	22	(0)
2017–2018	Ehime FC	1	(0)
2018	→ Blaublitz Akita (loan)	9	(0)
2019–	Nara Club		
- * Club domestic league appearances and goals as of 30 November 2018

Shuhei Hotta (堀田 秀平, Hotta Shūhei; born May 12, 1989) is a Japanese football player currently playing for Nara Club.

== Career ==
He previously played for Consadole Sapporo and Kashiwa Reysol.

== Club stats ==
Updated to 30 November 2018.

Club performance			League		Cup		League Cup		Total	
Season	Club	League	Apps	Goals	Apps	Goals	Apps	Goals	Apps	Goals
Japan			League		Emperor's Cup		League Cup		Total	
2008	Consadole Sapporo	J1 League	0	0	0	0	0	0	0	0
2009	Consadole Sapporo	J2 League	0	0	0	0	–		0	0
2010	Consadole Sapporo	J2 League	2	0	0	0	–		2	0
Singapore			League		Singapore Cup		League Cup		Total	
2011	Albirex Niigata Singapore	S.League	24	1	4	0	3	1	31	2
2012	Albirex Niigata Singapore	S.League	21	1	3	0	2	0	26	1
2013	Albirex Niigata Singapore	S.League	21	0	1	0	1	0	23	0
2014	Albirex Niigata Singapore	S.League	22	4	3	0	2	0	27	4
Japan			League		Emperor's Cup		League Cup		Total	
2016	Blaublitz Akita	J3 League	22	0	0	0	–		22	0
2017	Ehime FC	J2 League	1	0	1	0	–		2	0
2018	Blaublitz Akita	J3 League	9	0	1	0	–		10	0
2019	Nara Club	JFL					–			
Total	Japan		34	0	2	0	0	0	34	0
Total	Singapore		88	6	11	0	8	1	107	7
Career total			122	6	13	0	8	1	143	7

== Honours ==
Albirex Niigata Singapore

- Singapore League Cup: 2011
