= Serge Souchon-Koguia =

Central African Republic footballer (born 1987)

Personal information
- Full name: Serge Michael Souchon-Koguia
- Date of birth: 12 October 1987 (age 39)
- Place of birth: Bangui, Central African Republic
- Height: 1.75 m (5 ft 9 in)
- Position: Midfielder

Senior career*
Years	Team	Apps	(Gls)
2000–2002	Castanéenne		
2002–2003	Marmande 47		
2003–2004	Blagnac		
2004–2006	Cugnaux		
2006–2009	Toulouse Rodéo		
2009–2010	Toulouse MFC		
2010–2011	Étoile	36	(0)
2012	Tanjong Pagar United	11	(1)
2012–2013	Toulouse Fontaines	20	(0)
2013–2014	TOAC		
2014–2015	Castanet		
2015–2017	Juventus Papus		

International career
2011–2019	Central African Republic	2	(0)
- * Club domestic league appearances and goals as of 10:14, 22 March 2019 (UTC)

Serge Souchon-Koguia (born 12 October 1987) is a Central African Republican footballer who plays as a midfielder. He has represented the Central African Republic on two occasions, both in 2011.

== Club career ==
In 2010, Souchon-Koguia signed for newly created club Étoile in the Singapore S.League. He made his debut during the 2010 S.League season against Albirex Niigata (S) in a 0–0 draw.

In 2012, he move to Tanjong Pagar United after Étoile withdrew from the S.League citing youth commitment reasons.

== Controversy ==
Souchon-Koguia was involved in the controversial match for Étoile FC against Hougang United which was called off before kick-off when an all in brawl erupted during the pre-match warm up. Details of the fracas are sketchy, however it is believed the fight started when Souchon-Koguia's team-mate, Hadama Bathily entered the Hougang's warm up area to retrieve a miss-kicked ball. Bathily then attacked Hougang's assistant coach Hasrin Jailani after it was claimed by Bathili that he was racially abused by Jailani. Both teams then rushed to defend their respective team members where the fight escalated.

The Football Association of Singapore set up a disciplinary committee to investigate and punish the individuals responsible for causing the melee. Both clubs received $10,000 in fines, of which $5,000 was suspended until the end of season. Three Hougang members, including the assistant coach received fines and suspensions. Souchon-Koguia himself, received a five-match ban, and a $1,500-dollar fine for committing an assault on Hougang player Basit Abdul Hamid.

== International career ==
In 2011, Souchon-Koguia was called up to the Central African Republic national team for a friendly against Malta on 11 August 2011. He played the full 90 minutes, in which Malta ran out 2–1 winners.

Souchon-Koguia was called up for a second time, by CAR manager Jules Accorsi, this time for a crucial 2012 African Cup of Nations qualification match against Morocco. The Central African Republic, who at the time were tied with Morocco on first, needed to win the game in order to progress through to the 2012 African Cup of Nations, however a 0–0 draw would see them finish 2nd in the group, after losing to Algeria in the next match, in which he was not called up for.

International appearances and goals
#	Date	Venue	Opponent	Result	Score	Goals	Competition
2011
1.	11 August 2011	Ta' Qali Stadium, Malta	Malta	Loss	2–1	0	Friendly
2.	4 September 2011	Barthelemy Boganda Stadium, Central African Republic	Morocco	Draw	0–0	0	2012 Africa Cup of Nations qualification

== Honours ==
=== Étoile ===
- S.League: 2010
- Singapore League Cup: 2010
