= Pierre Nlate =

Cameroonian-French footballer (born 1988)

Pierre Lejeune Nlate
Personal information
- Full name: Pierre Lejeune Nlate
- Date of birth: 22 August 1988 (age 38)
- Place of birth: Mezesse, Cameroon
- Height: 1.78 m (5 ft 10 in)
- Position: Defender

Youth career
- 2004–2005: AS Nancy

Senior career*
Years	Team	Apps	(Gls)
2005–2010	FC Gueugnon	13	(0)
2010–2011	FC Villefranche	22	(0)
2011	Etoile FC	29	(0)
2013	Atlantis FC	23	(3)
2014	FC Futura	5	(0)
2014	FC Myllypuro	19	(2)
2015–2016	Atlantis FC	29	(3)
2017–2019	FC Viikingit	66	(8)
2020	NJS	2	(0)
2020	FC Viikingit	5	(1)

International career
2006–2007	Cameroon U-20	1	(0)
2007–2008	Cameroon U-23	2	(0)
- * Club domestic league appearances and goals as of 14:20, 14 November 2021 (UTC)

Pierre Lejeune Nlate (born 22 August 1988) is a Cameroon-French association footballer who plays as a defender.

== Career ==
Signed by professional S.League club Etoile FC, for the 2011 S.League season, Pierre Lejeune Nlate made his debut in the 2–0 win over Geylang United on the opening day of the S.League season.
