= Juma'at Jantan =

Singaporean footballer (born 1984)

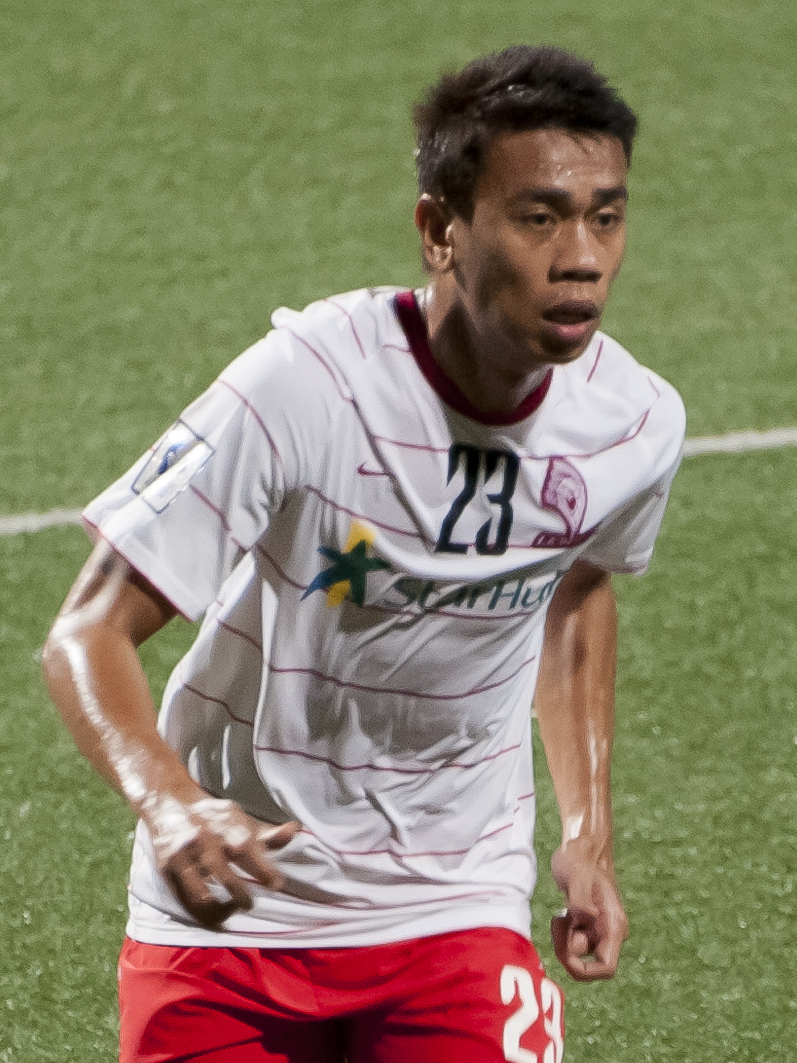
- Juma'at in 2012

Personal information
- Full name: Juma'at bin Jantan
- Date of birth: 23 February 1984 (age 42)
- Place of birth: Singapore
- Height: 1.72 m (5 ft 8 in)
- Position: Right back

Senior career*
Years	Team	Apps	(Gls)
2003	Sembawang Rangers	5	(0)
2004–2007	Young Lions	48	(0)
2007–2011	Home United	57	(2)
2012	LionsXII	17	(0)
2013–2019	Home United	85	(3)
2022	Admiralty CSN	0	(0)
2023	South Avenue SC	0	(0)

International career^{‡}
2005–2017	Singapore	39	(0)
- * Club domestic league appearances and goals as of 11 March 2020 ‡ National team caps and goals as of 11 March 2020

Juma'at bin Jantan (born 23 February 1984) is a Singaporean former professional footballer who played as a right back or a right-sided midfielder for National Football League club, South Avenue SC and previously the Singapore national team. Jantan was seen as a no-nonsense workhorse and was known for his terrific stamina.

== International career ==
He made his international debut against Cambodia on 11 October 2005 and has earned 6 more caps since then.

He was part of the Singapore Under-23 team that took part in the 2007 Southeast Asian Games in Korat, Thailand that won a bronze medal.

He was recalled to the senior squad in March 2016 after a two-year hiatus and went on to make two starts in two games.

== Club statistics ==
As of 23 July 2019.

Club	Season	League			Cup		Continental		Other		Total	
Club	Season	Division	Apps	Goals	Apps	Goals	Apps	Goals	Apps	Goals	Apps	Goals
Home United	2007	S.League	?	0	?	0	?	0	?	0	?	0
Home United	2008	S.League	?	0	?	0	?	0	?	0	?	0
Home United	2009	S.League	24	2	0	0	0	0	0	0	24	2
Home United	2010	S.League	26	1	1	0	0	0	0	0	27	1
Home United	2011	S.League	31	1	6	0	0	0	0	0	37	1
Home United	Total		81	4	7	0	0	0	0	0	88	4
LionsXII	2012	Malaysia Super League	17	0	0	0	4	0	0	0	21	0
LionsXII	Total		17	0	0	0	4	0	0	0	21	0
Home United	2013	S.League	16	1	5	0	4	0	0	0	25	1
Home United	2014	S.League	20	0	5	0	3	0	6	0	34	0
Home United	2015	S.League	21	0	5	0	2	0	0	0	28	0
Home United	2016	S.League	20	2	1	0	4	0	0	0	25	2
Home United	2017	S.League	19	0	0	0	0	0	9	0	28	0
Home United	2018	Singapore Premier League	5	0	0	0	0	0	8	0	13	0
Home United	2019	Singapore Premier League	7	0	0	0	0	0	6	0	13	0
Home United	Total		108	3	16	0	13	0	29	0	166	3
Career total			13	6	0	0	0	0	6	2	19	8

== Honours ==
Home United

- Singapore Cup: 2011, 2013
- Singapore Community Shield: 2019

Singapore

- SEA Games bronze medal: 2007
