= Guglielmo Arena =

Swiss football manager (born 1973)

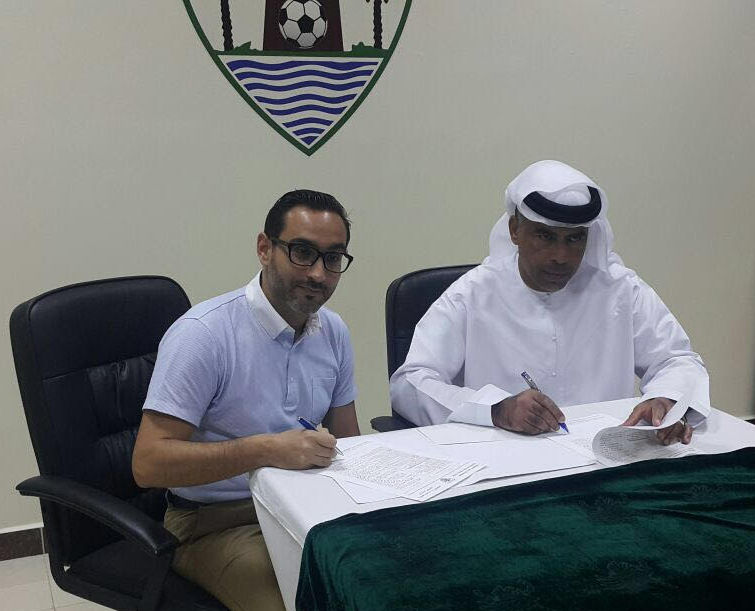
- Guglielmo Arena signing a contract with Dibba Al-Hisn

Personal information
- Full name: Guglielmo Arena
- Date of birth: 23 December 1973 (age 52)
- Place of birth: Montreux, Switzerland
- Height: 1.74 m (5 ft 9 in)

Managerial career
- Years: Team
- 2003–2004: ASFA Yennenga
- 2007: US Collombey-Muraz
- 2008–2009: Tonnerre d'Abomey FC
- 2009: COD Meknès
- 2009–2010: IZ Khemisset
- 2011: Étoile FC
- 2012: CR Belouizdad
- 2013–2014: Al Urooba Club
- 2014: Fanja SC
- 2015: Zhejiang Professional FC (assistant)
- 2016: Dibba Al-Hisn Sports Club
- 2016: Dubai CSC
- 2018: Buildcon FC
- 2018–2019: FC Conthey
- 2022: RC Oued Zem
- 2023: Laos U23 (caretaker)
- 2024: MAS Fès
- 2026: Nepal
- 2026-: UTS Rabat

Guglielmo Arena (born 23 December 1973) is an Italian-Swiss football manager.

== Career ==
In 2011, Arena was appointed manager of Singaporean side Étoile FC. In 2012, he was appointed manager of Algerian side CR Belouizdad. In 2018, he was appointed manager of Zambian side Buildcon FC. After that, he was appointed manager of Swiss side FC Conthey. In 2020, he was appointed manager of Moroccan side RC Oued Zem. On 2026 march he was appointed as head coach of Nepal Men's National Team.
