= Selim Kaabi =

French footballer (born 1984)

Personal information
- Full name: Selim Kaabi
- Date of birth: 27 July 1984 (age 42)
- Place of birth: Toulon, France
- Height: 1.86 m (6 ft 1 in)
- Position: Defender

Team information
- Current team: Etoile FC
- Number: 23

Senior career*
Years	Team	Apps	(Gls)
–2009	Torredonjimeno CF		
2009	R.E. Virton		
2010	FC Inter Turku		
2011	Etoile FC	27	(3)
- * Club domestic league appearances and goals as of 16:47, 13 November 2011 (UTC)

Selim Kaabi (born 27 July 1984) is a French former footballer who last played for Etoile FC in the Singapore S.League.

== Career ==
Before signing with the Clementi Stars, Kaabi played for the now defunct Torredonjimeno CF in the Spanish fourth division, as well as clubs in Belgium and Finland.

Kaabi made his debut for the Clementi Stars in the opening round 0-0 draw with Balestier Khalsa. A week later, he opened his scoring account for the club, in the 2-0 victory over Geylang United in which he also picked up a booking.
