= Shimpei Sakurada =

Japanese footballer

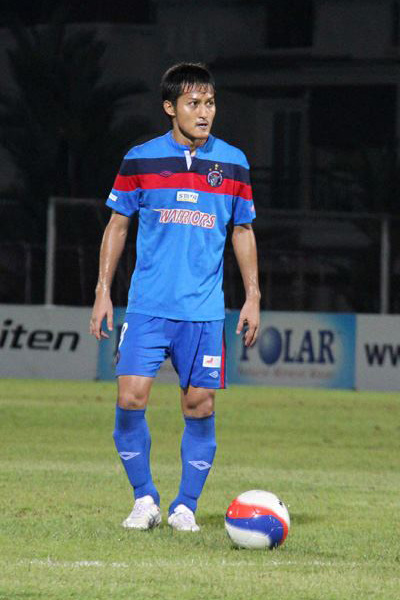
- Sakurada preparing to take a freekick against Home United in an S.League fixture at Choa Chu Kang Stadium on March 4, 2012

Personal information
- Date of birth: May 5, 1984 (age 42)
- Place of birth: Japan
- Height: 1.78 m (5 ft 10 in)
- Position: Midfielder

Team information
- Current team: Yadanarbon FC
- Number: 8

Youth career
- 2003–2007: Kansai University

Senior career*
Years	Team	Apps	(Gls)
2007	Gifu	3	(1)
2007–2008	Gifu II	6	(2)
2009	Okinawa Kariyushi	9	(3)
2010	JAPAN Soccer College	12	(4)
2011	Albirex Niigata FC (Singapore)	32	(6)
2012–2013	Singapore Armed Forces FC	42	(13)
2014–	Yadanarbon FC	45	(14)
- * Club domestic league appearances and goals as of 4 February 2014

Shimpei Sakurada (樱田 真平, Sakurada Shinpei; born May 5, 1984) is a Japanese football player. He is currently playing for Yadanarbon FC.

== Career ==
He first joined the S.League in 2011, playing for Albirex Niigata FC (Singapore), captaining the side. He won the 2011 Singapore League Cup in penalty shootouts against Hougang United after a goalless draw at the end of Extra Time. The first silverware in the team's history. Shimpei made the second attempt; Jordan Webb's miss proved costly.

In 2012, together with Tatsuro Inui, the pair signed for Singapore Armed Forces FC (currently known as Warriors FC) on 2-year contracts. He won the 2012 RHB Singapore Cup in the cup final against Tampines Rovers, with the aid of an Erwan Gunawan injury time winner, Shimpei scored a 78th-minute equaliser in the process. His second silverware in as many years in the S.League. However, he was left out of the 2013 AFC Cup squad due to the limitations on foreign players quota.

At the end of his contract with Warriors FC, Shimpei went on for trials in various countries in the region. One of which is Perak FA from the Malaysia Super League. On 31 January 2014, it was announced on his personal Facebook page that he has signed for Yadanarbon FC. He made his Myanmar National League debut on 1 February 2014, against Chin United, he was part of the starting lineup.

== Honours ==
Singapore League Cup

- 2011: Champions

Singapore Cup

- 2012: Champions
