= Zulfadli Zainal Abidin =

Singaporean footballer

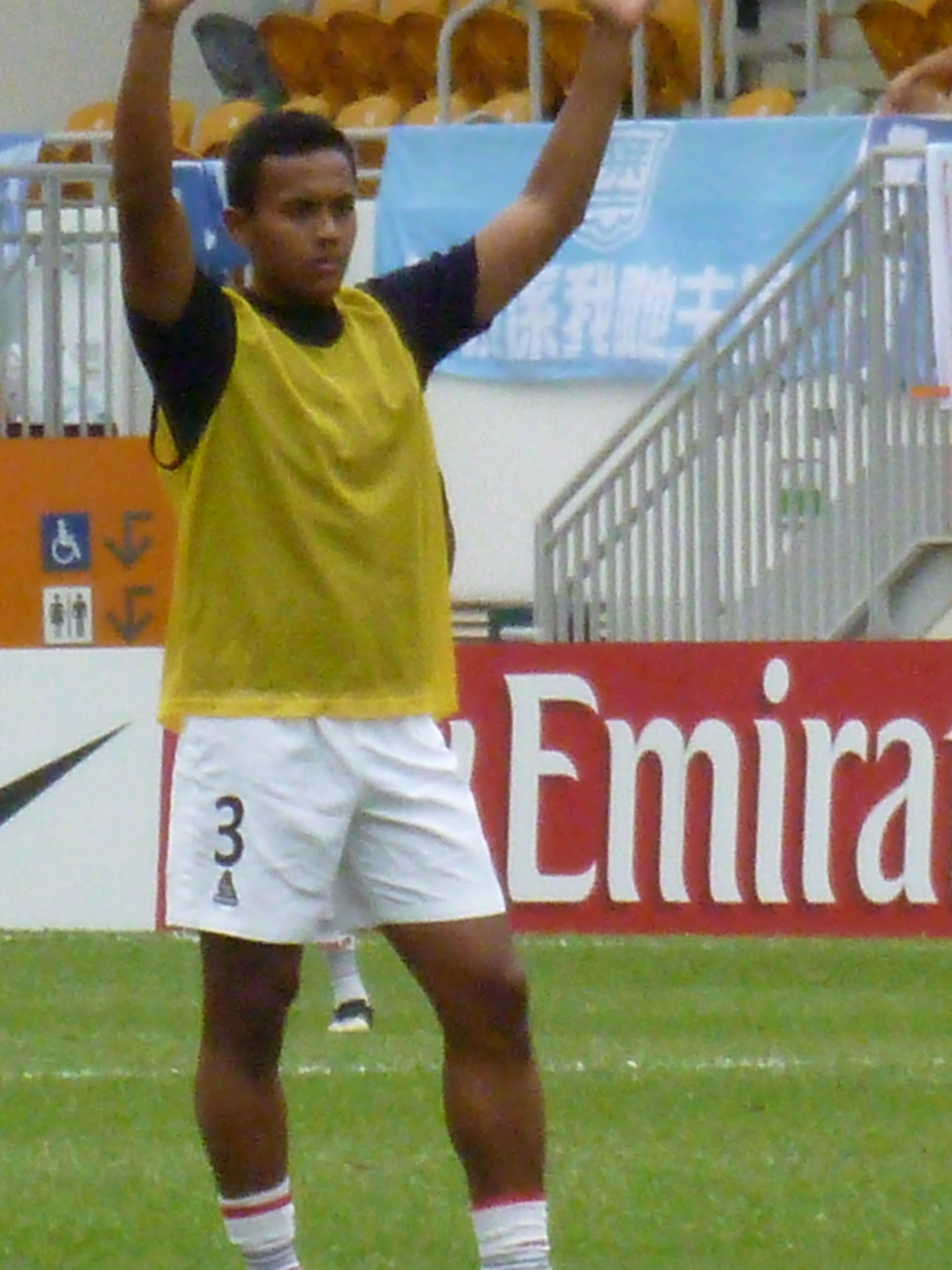

Personal information
- Full name: Zulfadli Zainal Abidin
- Date of birth: 26 April 1988 (age 38)
- Place of birth: Singapore
- Height: 1.73 m (5 ft 8 in)
- Position: Left back

Team information
- Current team: Geylang International
- Number: 4

Youth career
- 2004: Singapore U17

Senior career*
Years	Team	Apps	(Gls)
2006	Tampines Rovers prime league		
2007–2009	Young Lions	7	(0)
2009	Singapore Armed Forces FC	0	(0)
2010–2011	Home United FC	24	(1)
2011–2014	Warriors	68	(2)
2015	Tampines Rovers	15	(0)
2016–2017	Warriors	22	(0)
2018–	Geylang International		

International career^{‡}
2013–	Singapore	2	(0)
- * Club domestic league appearances and goals as of 4 January 2017 ‡ National team caps and goals as of 20:30, 3 June 2016 (UTC)

Zulfadli Zainal Abidin (born 26 April 1988) is a Singaporean professional footballer who plays for the Geylang International in the S.League.

== Club career ==
Zulfadli has previously played for S.League clubs Singapore U-17, Tampines Rovers FC, Home United Football Club and Young Lions.

Zulfadli came late to serious football, having initially kicked a ball around only with his friends and had done little beyond that until getting a chance at Bartley Secondary School.

He must have shown promise as he was selected for the NFA Under 15, Under 16, Under 17 and Under 18 squads and also played a year for Tampines Rovers FC in their Prime League side.

He had been spotted when appearing for Bartley Secondary School during Sec 2 when playing in a pre-season friendly against the Under 15 NFA side.

The coach at the time, Rajendran, liked what he saw of the then striker, who also played as a centre-back at Tampines Rovers FC, and based on his performance invited Zulfadli to play for his NFA Under 15s the following year.

In the following season with the Under-16 team, Zulfadli played in left midfield under R. Suriamuthi, and this appears to be the position he has leaned towards ever since.

After that V. Sundramoorthy had the budding midfielder under his care at the Young Lions.

Some of his team mates that year included Shahdan Sulaiman and Khairul Amri.

After two years there, Zulfadli was disappointed to learn that he was not being included for another season and was going to be without a club, prompting thoughts of even finishing with football.

It was then that Singapore Armed Forces FC stepped in and Richard Bok, who had taken advice from Zulfadli’s former coach Raj, handed Zulfadli a lifeline, since the player had almost resigned himself to being out of the S.League; having tasted that after a previous experience in the Prime League, he had no interest in dropping down to that level.

The appearance in the Warriors' AFC Champions League game in Japan against Kashima Antlers two years ago ranks as his career highlight.

National service came soon after the Kashima Antlers game and the only way he could continue in the S.League was by switching allegiances and moving to Home United FC.

Enlisting in the Singapore Civil Defence Force in October 2009, he found things difficult, juggling training at Clementi Stadium with his national service commitments.

Zulfadli suffered a serious hamstring injury, while jogging alone at the gym, and the hamstring problem affected both legs. He was advised to rest for six months and did not made it back until he played Woodlands Wellington FC on 22 June 2011 at left back and won 5-1. Having played against all of the big teams for Home United FC and things were going well until he suffered a Grade 3 MCL tear while playing Hougang United FC.

Zulfadli made only one appearance for them before the end of national service, as a substitute against Etoile FC in a Singapore Cup Quarter Final second-leg game at Queenstown Stadium, which he won 1-0.

Following his completion of national service, Zulfadli return to Singapore Armed Forces FC where the 23-year-old was on the bench against Home United FC, as the Warriors lost 4-0 on 16 Oct.

On his first start at the Hougang Stadium three days later, he justified coach Richard Bok's faith by netting the clincher in a 3-1 win with a cracking goal from 20 metres out on the left that left Fadhil Salim sprawling.

On 31 Oct, there was another goal to come for Zulfadli, this time off the bench, in a match at Bedok Stadium against Geylang United FC when the 83rd minute replacement netted the sixth goal in a 6-3 rout of the Eagles.

In 2015, Zulfadli signed for Tampines Rovers.

After a season with Tampines, Zulfadli returned to Warriors for the 2016 S.League campaign. He is also the captain of the team.

== International career ==
Zulfadli was first called up to the national team as a replacement for Shaiful Esah in 2013. He made his international debut in 2013. He got called up frequently from 2014 to 2015 but did not make any appearance. Due to Noh Rahman's retirement from international football, after he was included in the squad for the 2016 AYA Bank Cup, he was called up as a replacement. He made his second appearance on 3 June 2016 against Myanmar in a 1-0 win, replacing Gabriel Quak in the 84th minute.

== Career statistics ==
=== Club ===
As of match played November 2016. Caps and goals may not be correct.

Club	Season	S.League		Singapore Cup		Singapore League Cup		Asia		Total	
Club	Season	Apps	Goals	Apps	Goals	Apps	Goals	Apps	Goals	Apps	Goals
Young Lions	2007	??	??	??	??	??	??	—		??	??
Young Lions	2008	??	??	??	??	??	??	—		??	??
Young Lions	2009	7	0	-	-	-	-	—		7	0
Young Lions	Total	7	0	0	0	0	0	0	0	7	0
Singapore Armed Forces	2009	0	0	0	0	0	0	0	0	0	0
Singapore Armed Forces	Total	0	0	0	0	0	0	0	0	0	0
Home United	2010	20	1	-	-	1	0	—		21	1
Home United	2011	4	0	2	0	2	1	—		8	1
Home United	Total	24	1	2	0	3	1	0	0	29	2
Warriors	2011	6	2	0	0	0	0	—		6	2
Warriors	2012	20	0	6	0	2	0	—		28	0
Warriors	2013	18	0	1	0	3	0	4	0	26	0
Warriors	2014	24	0	1	0	2	0	—		27	0
Warriors	Total	68	2	8	0	7	0	4	0	87	2
Tampines Rovers	2015	15	0	1	0	2	0	—		18	0
Tampines Rovers	Total	15	0	1	0	2	0	0	0	18	0
Warriors	2016	22	0	1	0	0	0	—		23	0
Warriors	2017	0	0	0	0	0	0	—		0	0
Warriors	Total	22	0	1	0	0	0	0	0	23	0
Career Total		136	3	12	0	12	1	4	0	164	4

- Young Lions is ineligible for qualification to AFC competitions in their respective leagues.

=== International caps ===
As of June 2016

No	Date	Venue	Opponent	Result	Competition
1	??	??	??	??	Friendly
2	3 June 2016	Thuwunna Stadium, Yangon, Myanmar	Myanmar	0–1 (won)	2016 AYA Bank Cup
