= Qiu Li =

Singaporean footballer

Qiu Li 邱礼
Personal information
- Date of birth: 6 June 1981 (age 45)
- Place of birth: Shenyang, Liaoning, China
- Height: 1.83 m (6 ft 0 in)
- Positions: Midfielder; striker

Team information
- Current team: Balestier Khalsa (Youth Coach)

Youth career
- 1996–1999: Changchun Yatai

Senior career*
Years	Team	Apps	(Gls)
2000	Changchun Yatai	2	(0)
2001–2004	Liaoning Zhongyu	29	(4)
2005	→ Sinchi FC (loan)	22	(2)
2006	Young Lions	25	(19)
2007	Home United	28	(8)
2008–2010	Tampines Rovers	75	(33)
2011–2012	Home United	41	(23)
2013	Balestier Khalsa	19	(8)
2014	Home United	20	(6)
Total		234	(99)

International career^{‡}
2008–2013	Singapore	27	(2)

Managerial career
- 2015–2025: Liaoning Tieren (assistant)
- 2025–: Balestier Khalsa (youth)
- * Club domestic league appearances and goals as of Aug 14, 2017 ‡ National team caps and goals as of Aug 14, 2017

Qiu Li (Chinese: 邱礼, born June 6, 1981) is a former professional footballer and is currently the youth coach of Singapore Premier League club Balestier Khalsa. Born in China, he represented Singapore internationally.

== Playing career ==
=== Club career ===
Qiu started his senior career in Changchun Yatai and transferred to Liaoning Zhongyu in 2001. He was released by the club in 2005 as he was surplus to requirements.

Qiu was brought to Singapore to play for the S. League club, Sinchi FC, in 2005. After the club decided to pull out of the S-league for the 2006 season, he stayed in Singapore and agreed on a contract with the Young Lions where he excelled with 19 goals from 25 matches played. He joined Home United in 2007 but failed to find his form and joined Tampines Rovers in 2008. Impressive displays in his debuting two seasons earned him Singapore citizenship. In 2011, he joined Home United again and in 2013 he joined Balestier Khalsa after being released by Home United.

Qiu returned to Home United for the third time in 2014. However at the end of the season, he were released by the team again, and retired from playing professionally soon after.

== International career ==
Qiu made his debut for the Singapore national team on 28 May 2008, in a friendly against Bahrain.

However, on 24 November 2008, FIFA banned Qiu from playing for Singapore because he did not meet the new criteria stating that a new citizen needs to reside in his new country for five years. Qiu Li had only lived in Singapore for three years. Thus he would be only eligible to represent Singapore in 2010. Singapore lost two games by forfeit (3–0) during 2010 FIFA World Cup qualifiers because Qiu was lined up.

Qiu Li was naturalised in 2010 under the Foreign Sports Talent Scheme and was eligible to play for Singapore in 2010 under FIFA rules.

On 23 July 2011, Qiu Li scored his first goal for Singapore with a free-kick in the first leg of the 2014 FIFA World Cup Qualifier against Malaysia played at a sold out crowd at Jalan Besar Stadium.

== Coaching career ==
After retirement from professional football in 2015, Qiu returned to his hometown and joined China League Two (3rd division) club, Liaoning Shenyang. He helped the club to become the 2019 China League Two champions and see them promoted to China League One for the 2020 season.

On 13 January 2025, Qiu returned to Singapore to joined his former club Balestier Khalsa as the youth team academy coach.

== Honours ==
=== Club ===
Home United

- Singapore Cup: 2011

Balestier Khalsa

- League Cup: 2013

=== International ===
Singapore

- AFF Championship: 2012
