= Kamel Chaaouane =

French association football player (born 1984)

Personal information
- Date of birth: 16 March 1984 (age 42)
- Place of birth: Toulon, France
- Height: 1.75 m (5 ft 9 in)
- Position: Forward

Youth career
- –2005: Toulon

Senior career*
Years	Team	Apps	(Gls)
2005–2006	AS Saint-Cyr		
2006–2007	La Valette du Var		
2007–2011	Hyères	16	(0)
2011	Étoile	17	(8)
2012–2014	Toulon		
2014–20??	AS Sainte-Maxime		
- * Club domestic league appearances and goals

Kamel Chaaouane (born 16 March 1984) is a French former footballer.

== Career statistics ==
=== Club ===
Club	Season	League			National Cup		League Cup		Other		Total	
Club	Season	Division	Apps	Goals	Apps	Goals	Apps	Goals	Apps	Goals	Apps	Goals
Hyères	2009–10	Championnat National	16	0	0	0	–		0	0	16	0
Étoile	2011	S.League	17	8	5 (Note: Appearances in the Singapore Cup)	2	1 (Note: Appearances in the Singapore League Cup)	0	0	0	23	10
Career total			33	8	5	2	1	0	0	0	39	10
