= Hicham Bouchemlal =

Moroccan association footballer

Personal information
- Full name: Hicham Bouchemlal
- Date of birth: 12 June 1987 (age 39)
- Place of birth: Morocco
- Height: 1.82 m (5 ft 11 1/2 in)
- Position: Midfielder

Team information
- Current team: Etoile FC
- Number: 21

Senior career*
| Years | Team | Apps | (Gls) |
| 2006–2009 | Ittihad Zemmouri Khemisset | ? | (?) |
| 2009 | → FC La Tour - Le Pâquier (loan) | ? | (?) |
| 2010 | FC La Tour - Le Pâquier | ? | (?) |
| 2011– | Etoile FC | 20 | (4) |
- * Club domestic league appearances and goals as of 16:47, 13 November 2011 (UTC)

Hicham Bouchemlal is a Moroccan association footballer who plays for Etoile FC in the Singaporean S.League. He plays as a midfielder.

== Career ==
Bouchemlal signed for Etoile FC in 2011, and made his debut on the 24 March against Tanjong Pagar. He also scored the opening goal on his debut, in the 3–0 victory.
