= Sherif El-Masri =

Canadian soccer player (born 1990)

Personal information
- Date of birth: 5 February 1990 (age 36)
- Place of birth: Scarborough, Ontario, Canada
- Height: 1.80 m (5 ft 11 in)
- Position: Winger

Youth career
- Wexford SC
- 2004–2007: Toronto Lynx

Senior career*
| Years | Team | Apps | (Gls) |
| 2008 | Toronto Lynx | 5 | (0) |
| 2008 | FC Rouen | | |
| 2009–2011 | Home United | 27 | (5) |
| 2012–2015 | Young Lions | 80 | (14) |

International career^{‡}
| 2012 | Canada U23 | 3 | (0) |
- * Club domestic league appearances and goals as of 15:59, 13 January 2017 (UTC) ‡ National team caps and goals as of 15:59, 13 January 2017 (UTC)

Sherif El-Masri (born 5 February 1990) is a Canadian professional soccer player who plays as a winger.

== Early and personal life ==
He was born in Scarborough, Ontario to a Tunisian father and a Guyanese mother. His younger sister Mariam is also a soccer player who represents Guyana internationally.

== Club career ==
He began playing for Wexford SC at the age of five. He joined the Toronto Lynx when he was 14. When he was 16, he went to Italy for two months training with FC Matera before he decided to return to Canada to finish his high school diploma. He played for the Lynx senior team in the Premier Development League in 2008.

In 2008, he went to France where he joined FC Rouen in the Championnat National 2.

Late in 2008, he went to Singapore for a soccer trial, where he played two games, scoring a hat-trick in the first game. From this trial, he joined Singaporean club Home United in 2009, spending the 2010 and 2011 seasons with their senior team. He then moved to Young Lions, playing for them for the 2012 to 2015 seasons.

== International career ==
El-Masri made three appearances for the Canadian under-23 national team in 2012. In November 2015 he announced his desire to represent Singapore at international level, subject to receiving a Singaporean passport. He was announced as part of the Guyana senior team's provisional squad in September 2016.

== Honours ==
Home United

- Singapore Cup: 2011
