= Chun Jae-woon =

South korean footballer (born 1981)

Chun Jae-Woon
Personal information
- Full name: Chun Jae-Woon (전재운)
- Date of birth: March 18, 1981 (age 45)
- Place of birth: Republic of Korea
- Height: 1.78 m (5 ft 10 in)
- Position: Midfielder

Senior career*
Years	Team	Apps	(Gls)
2001–2004	Ulsan Hyundai Horang-i	68	(6)
2005	Suwon Samsung Bluewings	10	(1)
2005–2006	Jeonbuk Hyundai Motors	14	(1)
2007–2010	Jeju United	49	(5)
2010	Home United FC	18	(3)

International career
1999	Korea Republic U-18		
2000	Korea Republic U-19		
2004	Korea Republic U-23		
- * Club domestic league appearances and goals

Chun Jae-Woon (Korean: 전재운; born March 18, 1981) is a retired South Korean football player. He has previously played for Ulsan Hyundai, Suwon Samsung, Jeonbuk Hyundai and Jeju United.
