= Ryuta Hayashi =

Japanese footballer

Personal information
- Date of birth: 3 January 1990 (age 36)
- Place of birth: Ōgaki, Gifu, Japan
- Height: 1.66 m (5 ft 5 in)
- Positions: Defender; midfielder

Youth career
- 2005–2007: Ogaki Industrial HS

Senior career*
Years	Team	Apps	(Gls)
2008	Japan Soccer College	0	(0)
2009–2011	Albirex Niigata (S)	76	(1)
2012	AS.Laranja Kyoto	11	(0)
2013	FC Gifu	0	(0)
2014–2016	MSV Pampow	56	(10)
Total		143	(11)
- * Club domestic league appearances and goals

Ryuta Hayashi (林 隆太, Hayashi Ryūta; born 3 January 1990) is a Japanese former footballer.

== Career statistics ==
=== Club ===
Club	Season	League			National Cup		League Cup		Other		Total	
Club	Season	Division	Apps	Goals	Apps	Goals	Apps	Goals	Apps	Goals	Apps	Goals
Japan Soccer College	2008	Hokushinetsu Football League	0	0	0	0	–		0	0	0	0
Albirex Niigata (S)	2009	S.League	15	0	0	0	0	0	0	0	15	0
Albirex Niigata (S)	2010	S.League	30	0	3 (Note: Appearances in the Singapore Cup)	1	1 (Note: Appearances in the Singapore League Cup)	0	0	0	34	1
Albirex Niigata (S)	2011	S.League	31	1	6	0	4	0	0	0	41	1
Albirex Niigata (S)	Total		76	1	9	1	5	0	0	0	90	2
AS.Laranja Kyoto	2012	Kansai Soccer League	11	0	0	0	–		0	0	11	0
FC Gifu	2013	J.League 2	0	0	0	0	0	0	0	0	0	0
MSV Pampow	2013–14	Verbandsliga	12	2	0	0	0	0	0	0	14	1
MSV Pampow	2014–15	Verbandsliga	23	5	0	0	2 (Note: Appearances in the Lübzer Landespokal)	2	9 (Note: Appearances in the DKMS Hallenmasters)	4	34	11
MSV Pampow	2015–16	Verbandsliga	21	3	0	0	3	1	6	2	30	6
MSV Pampow	Total		56	10	0	0	5	3	15	6	76	19
Career total			143	11	9	1	10	3	15	6	177	21
