= Shi Jiayi =

Singaporean footballer

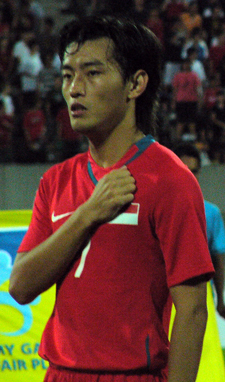
- Shi playing for Singapore in 2008

Personal information
- Full name: Shi Jiayi
- Date of birth: 2 September 1983 (age 43)
- Place of birth: Shanghai, China
- Height: 1.79 m (5 ft 10 in)
- Position: Midfielder

Youth career
- Shanghai State Football Academy

Senior career*
Years	Team	Apps	(Gls)
2002	Shanghai COSCO	0	(0)
2003–2004	Sinchi FC	27	(10)
2004–2006	Young Lions	66	(13)
2007–2012	Home United	102	(30)
2013–2015	Warriors FC	55	(7)
Total		267	(84)

International career
2005–2012	Singapore	69	(8)
- * Club domestic league appearances and goals

Shi Jiayi (Chinese: 施佳懿 born 2 September 1983) is a retired professional footballer who played as a midfielder. Born in China, he represented the Singapore national team.

Shi made 69 appearances for the Singapore national team, scoring 8 goals including against a European powerhouse, Poland during the 2010 King's Cup.

== Club career ==
=== Early career ===
Born in Shanghai, China, Shi started his career at Shanghai State Football Academy.

Shi began his career in 2002 for Shanghai COSCO but didn't make a single appearance

=== Sinchi FC ===
Shi moved to Singaporean's Sinchi FC in 2003.

=== Young Lions ===
He made an immediate impact with the Young Lions after joining from Sinchi FC during the mid-season transfer window in 2004. A positive, hardworking midfielder, his performances earned him a nomination for the S.League 'Young Player of the Year' award.

=== Home United ===
In 2007, Shi moved to Home United. He was name as the club captain for the 2011 season.

=== Warriors FC ===
After the end of the 2012 S.League season, Shi signed for Warriors FC.

Shi scored his first goal of the 2015 S.League season in the second league game of the season, guiding the Warriors to a 3–1 victory over Harimau Muda and sending his club to the top of the table. At the end of the season, Shi was released from the club and returned to China, retiring from professional football.

== International career ==
Shi made his debut for the Singapore national team on 11 October 2005 against Cambodia.

He scored his first international goal with a brace in a 4–0 win during the 2010 FIFA World Cup qualification match against Palestine on 8 October 2007.

Shi was an integral part of the team during the 2007 AFF Championship in which Singapore defeated Thailand 3–2 in the Finals.

On 23 January 2010, Shi scored the only goal against European powerhouse Poland in 6–1 lost during the 2010 King's Cup

=== International goals ===
#	Date	Venue	Opponent	Score	Result	Competition
1	8 October 2007	Doha, Qatar	Palestine	4–0	Won	2010 FIFA World Cup Qualification
2	8 October 2007	Doha, Qatar	Palestine	4–0	Won	2010 FIFA World Cup Qualification
3	9 December 2008	Jakarta, Indonesia	Indonesia	2–0	Won	2008 AFF Championship
4	23 January 2010	Nakhon Ratchasima, Thailand	Poland	1–6	Lost	2010 King's Cup
5	4 November 2010	Hanoi, Vietnam	Vietnam	1–1	Draw	Friendly
6	7 June 2011	Singapore, Singapore	Maldives	4–0	Won	Friendly
7	23 July 2011	Singapore, Singapore	Malaysia	5–3	Won	2014 FIFA World Cup Qualification
8	28 July 2011	Kuala Lumpur, Malaysia	Malaysia	1–1	Draw	2014 FIFA World Cup Qualification

== Personal life ==
Shi was awarded Singapore citizenship in 2005.

On 4 January 2019, Shi took up FAS ‘C’ Coaching Certificate Course conducted in partnership with ITE College Central.

== Honours ==
Home United

- Singapore Cup: 2011

Warriors

- S.League: 2014
- Singapore Charity Shield: 2015

Singapore

- AFF Championship: 2007, 2012
