= Wilson Grosset =

Réunionese association footballer (born 1981)

Personal information
- Full name: Wilson Grosset
- Date of birth: 15 October 1981 (age 45)
- Place of birth: Saint Louis, Réunion
- Height: 1.74 m (5 ft 8 1/2 in)
- Position: Midfielder

Team information
- Current team: Etoile FC
- Number: 16

Senior career*
Years	Team	Apps	(Gls)
1995–1999	FC Martigues	?	(?)
1999–2000	US Stade Tamponnaise	?	(?)
2000–2001	Albion Rovers	6	(1)
2001–2003	ALM Évreux	?	(?)
2003–2006	Évreux AC	?	(?)
2006–2007	RC Épernay Champagne	?	(?)
2007–2008	AS Poissy	?	(?)
2008–2011	FC Villefranche	77	(17)
2011–	Etoile FC	15	(6)
- * Club domestic league appearances and goals as of 18 November 2011

Wilson Grosset (born 15 October 1981) is an association footballer from Réunion. Currently playing for Etoile FC in the Singapore S.League, Grosset has plied his trade in the lower leagues in France, but has also made appearances for clubs in the Scottish Third Division and the Réunion Premier League. He plays as a midfielder.

== Career ==
In 2000, after a successful trial Grosset moved to then Scottish Third Division club Albion Rovers F.C. by then manager John McVeigh from Réunion Premier League club US Stade Tamponnaise. However, his spell was short, only making 6 appearances for the club, scoring once in Albion's 2-0 win over Montrose F.C.

After leaving Scotland, Grosset became somewhat of a Journeyman, playing for 4 clubs in the space of 4 months, before settling down with a 6-year stint with AS Poissy. In late 2006 he moved to FC Villefranche where he made 77 appearances for 17 goals.

He then moved abroad once more, signing a contract with Professional Singapore S.League club Etoile FC, making his debut in the Week 16, 7-2 loss to Albirex Niigata Singapore FC. His first goal for the club however, would come soon thereafter with a tight 1-0 victory over Gombak United in the 2011 Singapore Cup. He would however go on to score a hat trick for Etoile in a 6-1 thumping over Tanjong Pagar.
