= Asraf Rashid =

Singaporean footballer

Asraf Rashidasrafil
Personal information
- Full name: Asraf Abdul Rashid
- Date of birth: 27 August 1985 (age 41)
- Place of birth: Singapore
- Height: 1.68 m (5 ft 6 in)
- Position: Midfielder

Team information
- Current team: Tanjong Pagar United
- Number: 7

Senior career*
Years	Team	Apps	(Gls)
2008–2010	Woodlands Wellington	48	(0)
2011	Home United	19	(3)
2012–	Tanjong Pagar United	58	(4)
- * Club domestic league appearances and goals as of 14 July 2014

Asraf Rashid (born 27 August 1985) is a professional football player who plays for Tanjong Pagar United in the S.League as a left midfielder.

== Club career ==
Asraf started his S.League career playing for Woodlands Wellington, before joining Home United and eventually settling at Tanjong Pagar United.

== Honours ==
Tanjong Pagar United

- Singapore Cup: 2011
