= Ridzuan Fatah Hasan =

Singaporean footballer

Personal information
- Full name: Muhamad Ridzuan Fatah Hasan
- Date of birth: October 2, 1981 (age 45)
- Place of birth: Singapore
- Height: 1.76 m (5 ft 9 1/2 in)
- Position: Goalkeeper

Team information
- Current team: Hougang United FC
- Number: 1

Senior career*
Years	Team	Apps	(Gls)
2000–2001	Tanjong Pagar United FC	0	(0)
2003–2004	Home United FC	17	(0)
2004	Tanjong Pagar United FC	12	(0)
2005	Home United FC	7	(0)
2005	Paya Lebar Punggol FC	8	(0)
2006–2010	Home United FC	?	(?)
2011–	Hougang United FC		
- * Club domestic league appearances and goals as of May 13, 2009

Ridzuan Fatah Hasan (born 2 October 1981) is a professional soccer player who plays for the Hougang United FC in the S.League.

== Club career ==
Ridzuan has previously played for S.League clubs Tanjong Pagar United FC and Paya Lebar Punggol FC.

== Honours ==
=== Club ===
==== Home United ====
- S.League: 2003
- Singapore Cup: 2003, 2005
