= Franklin Anzité =

Central African footballer (born 1985)

Personal information
- Full name: Franklin Clovis Anzité Touadéré
- Date of birth: 2 November 1985 (age 41)
- Place of birth: Bangui, Central African Republic
- Height: 1.95 m (6 ft 5 in)
- Position: Centre-back

Youth career
- 2003–2004: FC Tigres Bangui

Senior career*
Years	Team	Apps	(Gls)
2005–2007	Ajaccio	8	(0)
2007	Swindon Town	0	(0)
2008	Weymouth	4	(0)
2008–2009	Libourne	7	(0)
2009–2010	Martigues	10	(1)
2011	Étoile FC	18	(0)
2012	Home United	16	(1)
2013	Samut Songkhram	1	(0)
2013–2014	Trat	27	(0)
2014–2015	Ayutthaya	30	(3)
2015–2016	Hoàng Anh Gia Lai	12	(0)
2016	Long An	13	(2)
2016	UiTM		
2017	PS TIRA	14	(0)
2018	Perak II	20	(1)
2019–2020	Sarawak United		
2020–2021	Besançon Football	3	(0)
2021–2022	Racing Besançon	5	(0)

International career^{‡}
2010–2019	Central African Republic	37	(0)
- * Club domestic league appearances and goals as of 9 April 2022 ‡ National team caps and goals as of 19 November 2019

Franklin Clovis Anzité Touadéré (born 2 November 1985) is a Central African professional footballer who plays as centre-back.

== Club career ==
Anzité did not make an appearance for Swindon Town's first team but played in several positions in the club's reserve team. Anzité was released by manager Maurice Malpas after he publicly stated that he and two other Portuguese players were brought by the previous club owners. He signed with Football Conference side Weymouth prior to being released at the end of the season. He played the 2009–10 season for Martigues and joined S.League club Étoile in January 2011.

== Personal life ==
Anzité holds dual citizenship of the Central African Republic and France.
