= Vitor Borges =

Brazilian footballer

Personal information
- Full name: Vitor Borges de Souza
- Date of birth: 13 July 1988 (age 38)
- Place of birth: Brazil
- Height: 1.84 m (6 ft 0 in)
- Position: Forward

Senior career*
Years	Team	Apps	(Gls)
2010–2011	Balestier Khalsa FC	45	(7)
2011	Hougang United FC	15	(4)
2011–2012	PSIS Semarang		
2013	Balestier Khalsa FC	6	(1)
2013–2014	Madureira Esporte Clube	2	(0)
2014	Gonçalense		
2016	Associação Desportiva Itaboraí		
2017	OPS	2	(0)
2017–2018	KajHa		
- * Club domestic league appearances and goals

Vitor Borges de Souza (born 13 July 1988) is a Brazilian former professional footballer who plays as a forward.

== Career ==
=== Singapore ===
Moving to Balestier Khalsa of the Singaporean S.League in 2010, Borges re-joined the club in 2011 after they released him.

Succeeding his stint with PSIS Semarang, Balestier Khalsa purchased the Brazilian again in 2013.

=== Indonesia ===
Due to Borges not scoring goals, the PSIS Semarang management paid him less, causing supporters to give donations.

He was involved in a 2013 car accident in Indonesia. The forward was listed as a suspect but there was not enough information to substantiate a charge.

=== Finland ===
Arriving at KajHa in 2017, Borges tallied three goals in his first three appearances for the club.
