= Kenji Arai =

Japanese footballer (born 1978)

Kenji Arai 新井 健二
Personal information
- Date of birth: May 19, 1978 (age 48)
- Place of birth: Saitama, Japan
- Height: 1.82 m (5 ft 11 1/2 in)
- Position: Defender

Youth career
- 1994–1996: Tokiwa High School

College career
Years	Team	Apps	(Gls)
1997–2000	Rissho University		

Senior career*
Years	Team	Apps	(Gls)
2001–2003	Albirex Niigata	26	(0)
2004–2005	Albirex Niigata Singapore	51	(6)
2006–2009	Singapore Armed Forces	119	(15)
2009–2010	Sporting CG		
2010	Sengkang Punggol	17	(3)
2011–2012	Home United	37	(1)
Total		250	(25)
- * Club domestic league appearances and goals

Kenji Arai (新井 健二, Arai Kenji; born May 19, 1978) is a former Japanese professional football player.

== Playing career ==
Arai entered professional football with Albirex Niigata after graduating from Rissho University in 2001 but was unable to hold on to the first team place although he played 20 league games for Albirex Niigata in his first season. He was on loan to Albirex Niigata FC (Singapore) in 2004 and in 2006 he secured a permanent move to Singapore Armed Forces FC.

He is also the second Japanese player, after his Singapore Armed Forces FC teammate Masahiro Fukasawa, to play in the AFC Champions League for a non-Japanese club. In November 2009, Kenji joined SC Goa. He returned to Singapore and joined Sengkang Punggol FC on 2010 and subsequently Home United FC in 2011.

== Club statistics ==
Club performance			League		Cup		League Cup		Total	
Season	Club	League	Apps	Goals	Apps	Goals	Apps	Goals	Apps	Goals
Japan			League		Emperor's Cup		J.League Cup		Total	
2001	Albirex Niigata	J2 League	20	0	2	0	2	0	24	0
2002	Albirex Niigata	J2 League	2	0	1	0	-		3	0
2003	Albirex Niigata	J2 League	4	0	1	0	-		5	0
Singapore			League		Singapore Cup		League Cup		Total	
2004	Albirex Niigata Singapore	S. League	26	3	1	0	-		27	3
2005	Albirex Niigata Singapore	S. League	25	3	3	0	-		28	3
2006	Singapore Armed Forces	S. League	28	3	3	0	-		31	3
2007	Singapore Armed Forces	S. League	30	4	6	1	-		36	5
2008	Singapore Armed Forces	S. League	31	4	5	1	-		36	5
2009	Singapore Armed Forces	S. League								
Country	Japan		26	0	4	0	2	0	32	0
Country	Singapore		140	20	18	2	-		158	22
Total			166	20	22	2	2	0	190	22

== Honours ==
Albirex Niigata

- J2 League: 2003

Singapore Armed Forces

- S.League: 2006, 2007, 2008, 2009
- Singapore Cup: 2007, 2008

== Videos ==
- youtube.com
