= Valery Hiek =

Cameroonian footballer (born 1981)

Personal information
- Date of birth: January 31, 1981 (age 45)
- Place of birth: Yaoundé, Cameroon
- Height: 1.85 m (6 ft 1 in)
- Position: Defender

Senior career*
| Years | Team | Apps | (Gls) |
| 2001–2007 | Cercle Sportif de Yaounde | | |
| 2008–2011 | Home United | 94 | (13) |
| 2012 | Bangkok Glass | | |
| 2013 | → Chainat Hornbill (loan) | 20 | (0) |
| 2014 | Chainat Hornbill | 11 | (2) |
| 2015 | Hua Hin City | | |
- * Club domestic league appearances and goals

Valery Hiek is a Cameroon football player.

== Career ==
He started his football in Cercle Sportif de Yaounde, Then in 2008 he signed for Home United.

In 2011 at the Jalan Besar Stadium, Home United FC lifted the RHB Singapore Cup after a hard-fought 1–0 win over Albirex Niigata FC.

Both teams were locked in a tactical battle from the start of the match. Albirex Niigata FC were playing their usual possession game as the Protectors sat back with five defenders. Despite that, Albirex Niigata FC were unable to carve out good openings as Man-of-the-match Valery Heik led his defence superbly.

During his time at home united he won the Singapore Cup in 2011, at the start of the 2011 season, the club strengthened its squad with Japanese defender Kenji Arai and Mendy, adding them to a lineup that included Valery Hiek, Shi Jiayi, and Juma'at Jantan. The signings were intended to support the club’s bid for the S.League title.

In 2012, he signed for Bangkok Glass, after which in 2013 he signed for Chainat Hornbill.

== Honours ==
=== Club ===
==== Home United ====
- Singapore Cup Champions: 2011

=== Individual ===
- S. League Player of the Year 2009
