= Frédéric Mendy (footballer, born 1988) =

Footballer (born 1988)

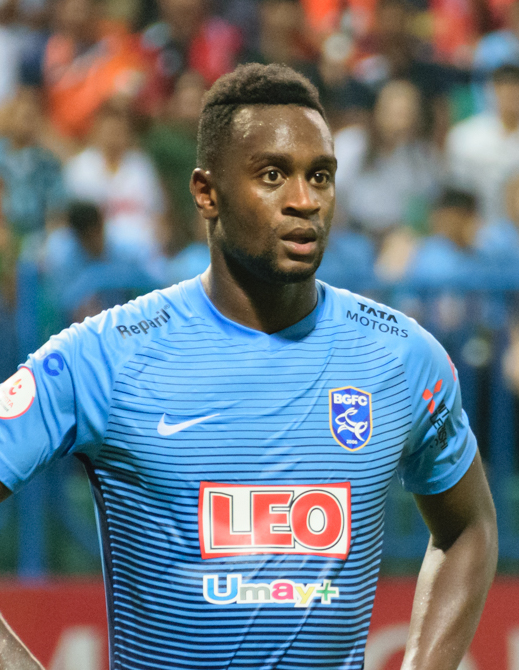
- Mendy playing for BG Pathum United in 2018

Personal information
- Date of birth: 18 September 1988 (age 38)
- Place of birth: Paris, France
- Height: 1.94 m (6 ft 4 in)
- Position: Forward

Team information
- Current team: Aubervilliers

Youth career
- Rezé

Senior career*
Years	Team	Apps	(Gls)
2009	Évreux	1	(0)
2010	Étoile	32	(21)
2011–2013	Home United	55	(41)
2013–2016	Estoril	16	(3)
2013–2014	→ Moreirense (loan)	19	(4)
2014–2015	→ União Madeira (loan)	44	(20)
2016	Ulsan Hyundai	18	(6)
2017	Jeju United	34	(7)
2018	BG Pathum United	14	(4)
2018–2022	Vitória Setúbal	74	(15)
2022–2023	Évreux	28	(10)
2023–2024	Aubervilliers	20	(1)

International career
2016–2022	Guinea-Bissau	24	(6)
- * Club domestic league appearances and goals as of 5 November 2024 (UTC)

Frédéric Mendy (born 18 September 1988) is a former professional footballer who last played as a forward for Championnat National 1 club Aubervilliers. Born in France, Mendy played for the Guinea-Bissau national team.

== Club career ==
=== Youth career ===
Mendy began his career with French non-league club FC Rezé and for CFA 2 club Évreux.

=== Étoile FC ===
In January 2010, Mendy signed his first professional contract with Étoile FC who had registered to participate in the Singapore 2010 S.League, one of the few leagues that allows foreign teams to participate. He scored one goal in the 2010 Singapore League Cup against Geylang United as Étoile went on to win the league cup. Mendy scored a brace against Cambodian Club Phnom Penh Crown in the 2010 Singapore Cup in which Étoile won 2–1 and progressed through to the Quarter Finals. Mendy first season for Étoile, would go on to score 21 goals in 32 appearances, receiving the Golden Boot for the 2010 season. Étoile would also be crowned 2010 S.League champions.

=== Home United ===
Mendy joined Home United at the start of the 2011 S.League season. He scored his first goal for Home United in the fourth minute of a 2–1 against Albirex Niigata (S). His fifth goal for the club came on 1 April 2011 when he struck an 81' minute equaliser against Tampines Rovers. It ended 1–1 and helping Home United remain unbeaten in the S.League after 25 games.

=== Estoril ===
In February 2013, Mendy, who knows how to speaks Portuguese, moved from Singapore to Portugal for the first time in his career joining Estoril for the 2012–13 Primeira Liga.

==== Loan to Moreirense ====
Midway throughout 2013, Mendy was loaned to second division, Moreirense where he would go on to win the 2013–14 Segunda Liga helping the club to gain promotion to the 2014–15 Primeira Liga.

==== Loan to União Madeira ====
On 2 July 2014, Mendy was loaned to União Madeira.

=== Ulsan Hyundai ===
Mendy moved to Korea to sign for K League 1 side Ulsan Hyundai in July 2016.

=== Jeju United ===
Mendy signed for Korean side Jeju United for the 2017 K League 1 season from rivals, Ulsan Hyundai. He scored his first goal for the club in the 2017 AFC Champions League in a 3–3 thriller against Australian side Adelaide United.

=== BG Pathum United ===
On 4 January 2018, Mendy joined newly revamp Thailand club, BG Pathum United ahead of the 2018 Thai League 1 season.

=== Vitória Setúbal ===
On 11 July 2018, Mendy returned to Portugal to signed with Vitória Setúbal.

=== Return to Évreux ===
After nearly 13 years, Mendy returned to his boyhood club, Évreux.

=== Aubervilliers ===
On 19 July 2023, Mendy joined fourth tier French club, Aubervilliers.

== International career ==
Mendy was born in Évreux, France and is of Mandjack (Guinea Bissau) descent. He was called up the Guinea-Bissau national team, and made his debut in a 2017 Africa Cup of Nations qualification win over Zambia where he scored his debut goal on 4 June 2016 in a 3–2 win.

Mendy was also part of Guinea-Bissau squad for the 2017 and the 2019 Africa Cup of Nations tournament where he played in all of the fixtures.

== Career statistics ==
=== Club ===
As of 3 June 2023

Club	Season	League			National Cup		League Cup		Continental		Total	
Club	Season	Division	Apps	Goals	Apps	Goals	Apps	Goals	Apps	Goals	Apps	Goals
Étoile	2010	Singapore Premier League	32	21	5	3	4	1	—		41	25
Home United	2011	Singapore Premier League	31	21	5	4	3	0	—		39	25
Home United	2012	Singapore Premier League	24	20	2	2	2	0	—		28	22
Home United	Total		55	41	7	6	5	0	—		67	47
Estoril	2012–13	Primeira Liga	1	0	0	0	0	0	—		1	0
Estoril	2015–16	Primeira Liga	15	3	1	0	0	0	—		16	3
Estoril	Total		16	3	1	0	0	0	—		17	3
Moreirense (loan)	2013–14	Segunda Liga	19	4	2	0	2	0	—		23	4
União Madeira (loan)	2014–15	Segunda Liga	44	20	1	0	8	4	—		53	24
Ulsan Hyundai	2016	K League 1	18	6	2	2	—		—		20	8
Jeju United	2017	K League 1	34	7	0	0	—		6	1	40	8
BG Pathum United	2018	Thai League 1	14	4	0	0	0	0	—		14	4
Vitória Setúbal	2018–19	Primeira Liga	28	4	2	1	1	1	—		31	6
Vitória Setúbal	2019–20	Primeira Liga	0	0	0	0	0	0	—		0	0
Vitória Setúbal	2020–21	Campeonato de Portugal	24	6	0	0	—		—		24	6
Vitória Setúbal	2021–22	Liga 3	22	5	2	0	—		—		24	5
Vitória Setúbal	Total		74	15	4	1	1	1	—		79	17
Évreux	2022–23	National 2	28	10	2	2	—		—		30	12
Career total			334	131	24	14	20	6	6	1	384	152

=== International ===
Scores and results list Guinea-Bissau's goal tally first, score column indicates score after each Mendy goal.

List of international goals scored by Frédéric Mendy
No.	Date	Venue	Opponent	Score	Result	Competition
1	4 June 2016	Estádio 24 de Setembro, Bissau, Guinea-Bissau	Zambia	2–1	3–2	2017 Africa Cup of Nations qualification
2	8 September 2018	Estádio do Zimpeto, Maputo, Mozambique	Mozambique	2–2	2–2	2019 Africa Cup of Nations qualification
3	10 October 2018	Levy Mwanawasa Stadium, Ndola, Zambia	Zambia	1–2	1–2	2019 Africa Cup of Nations qualification
4	23 March 2019	Estádio 24 de Setembro, Bissau, Guinea-Bissau	Mozambique	2–2	2–2	2019 Africa Cup of Nations qualification
5	30 March 2021	Estádio 24 de Setembro, Bissau, Guinea-Bissau	Congo	2–0	3–0	2021 Africa Cup of Nations qualification
6	7 September 2021	Al-Hilal Stadium, Omdurman, Sudan	Sudan	3–0	4–2	2022 FIFA World Cup qualification – CAF second round

== Honours ==
=== Club ===
==== Étoile FC ====
- S.League: 2010
- Singapore League Cup: 2010

==== Home United ====
- Singapore Cup: 2011

==== Moreirense ====
- Segunda Liga: 2013–14

=== Individual ===
- S.League Top Scorer: 2010, 2012
