= Maxime Belouet =

French footballer (born 1986)

Personal information
- Full name: Maxime Eric Rogers
- Date of birth: 11 August 1986 (age 40)
- Place of birth: Orléans, France
- Height: 1.83 m (6 ft 0 in)
- Position: Attacking midfielder

Youth career
- 2002–2004: Amiens SC
- 2004–2005: Angers SCO
- 2005–2006: AS Beauvais Oise

Senior career*
Years	Team	Apps	(Gls)
2006–2007	Vannes OC	8	(0)
2007–2008	US Roye-Noyon	30	(15)
2008–2011	US Orléans	47	(17)
2011–2012	Étoile	30	(9)
2012	Salgaocar	10	(0)
2013–2014	Sheikh Russel	3	(2)
2014–2015	Fanja SC	14	(1)
- * Club domestic league appearances and goals

Maxime Belouet (born 11 August 1986) is a French footballer.

== Style of play ==
Maxime plays as an attacking midfielder and playmaker and ha been noted for vision and passing skills.

== Personal life ==
Maxime is a supporter of Olympique de Marseille. He listens to rap music and enjoys to have Pasta.

== Club career ==
=== France ===
Maxime started playing for the youth team of current Championnat National team Amiens SC in 2002. He then played in top level of French youth football representing different clubs like Angers SCO(currently plays in Ligue 2), AS Beauvais Oise. In 2006, he began his professional career after signing with Championnat National side Vannes OC. He then moved to US Roye-Noyon in the 2007–2008 season where he had a good stint after scoring 15 goals in 30 appearances. In the next season he signed for US Orléans (currently plays in Championnat National), his hometown club and he played there for the next three seasons.

=== Singapore ===
Maxime first moved out of France in 2011 to Singapore to play for the S.League club Étoile FC. He made his debut in the opening round match of the 2011 S.League season in which they won 2–0 over Geylang United, with Maxime opening the scoring in the 39th minute. He was part of the team which secured fifth place for Étoile FC in the 2011 S.League. At the end of 2011 S.League, Étoile FC pulled out from the S.League, making him a free player. He was also selected in the S.League All Stars team for a charity match to support earthquake victims of Japan.

=== India ===
On 14 February 2012, Salgaocar SC, the I-League club, announced the signing of Maxime Belouet as their fourth Foreign Visa player and registered him for the 2012 AFC Cup and I-League. He was the first French footballer to ply his trade in India. He played both in the 2012–13 I-League and 2012 AFC Cup matches for the club where his performance was highly praised by football fans and critics and he was compared to be equally good to the famous Mohun Bagan A.C. player Jose Ramirez Barreto. He then got injured while playing against Al-Oruba SC of Oman in the 2012 AFC Cup. As a result, he had to go back to France to get the top treatment. He later recovered from the injury totally and became fit to play in the 2013–14 I-League season.

=== Switzerland ===
In August 2013, though he was under a contract with Salgaocar SC he moved to Switzerland to train with FC Montreux-Sports and also in order to find a new professional club. He played a few friendly matches for the Montreux-based club then playing in the 2. Liga Interregional, fourth division of the Swiss football league system.

=== Bangladesh ===
In September 2013, he moved to Bangladesh and signed a contract with Dhaka-based club Sheikh Russel KC. He played 3 matches in the 2013–14 Bangladesh Football Premier League and 2 in the 2013 Bangladesh Federation Cup. But later in the same season due to some disputes with the club management and some financial delays he decided to terminate his contract with the club.
