= Mohamed Doumbouya =

Guinean footballer

Personal information
- Full name: Mohamed Ali Doumbouya
- Date of birth: 18 July 1978 (age 48)
- Place of birth: Conakry, Guinea
- Height: 1.80 m (5 ft 11 in)
- Position: Striker

Senior career*
Years	Team	Apps	(Gls)
1998–1999	US Saint-Georges		
1999–2000	Montauban FCTG	18	(6)
2000–2001	Limoges FC	28	(14)
2001–2002	Bourg-Péronnas	29	(18)
2002–2003	Stade Brestois	30	(6)
2003	GSI Pontivy	8	(4)
2003–2004	Entente SSG	19	(8)
2004–2006	Libourne-Saint-Seurin	44	(7)
2006–2007	Pacy Vallée-d'Eure	8	(3)
2007–2008	FC Rouen	17	(10)
2008	Racing Besançon	6	(1)
2008–2010	US Orléans	32	(6)
2010–2011	USM Saran		
2011	Étoile FC	14	(6)
2012–2013	Bergerac Périgord	16	(1)
2013–2015	Montceau	12	(2)
2015–2016	Gueugnon	2	(0)
Total		283	(92)

International career
2008	Guinea	1	(2)
- * Club domestic league appearances and goals

Mohamed Ali Doumbouya (born 18 July 1978) is a Guinean former footballer who played as a striker.

== Career ==
Born in Conakry, Doumbouya played for US Saint-Georges, Montauban FCTG, Limoges FC, Bourg-Péronnas, Stade Brestois, GSI Pontivy, Entente SSG, Libourne-Saint-Seurin, Pacy Vallée-d'Eure, FC Rouen, Racing Besançon, US Orléans, USM Saran, Étoile FC, Bergerac Périgord, Montceau and Gueugnon.

Doumbouya made one international appearance for Guinea in 2008, scoring two goals on his debut.
