= Jonathan Toto =

French footballer (born 1990)

Personal information
- Full name: Jonathan Joseph Toto
- Date of birth: 30 March 1990 (age 36)
- Place of birth: Colombes, France
- Height: 1.88 m (6 ft 2 in)
- Position: Forward

Youth career
- –2008: Metz

Senior career*
Years	Team	Apps	(Gls)
2009	Canon Yaoundé		
2009	Legnano		
2010	Greenock Morton	4	(0)
2011	Étoile	24	(12)
2012–2013	Courts Young Lions	20	(8)
2013	Doxa Drama	15	(0)
- * Club domestic league appearances and goals

Jonathan Toto (born 30 March 1990) is a French former professional footballer who played as a forward.

An Metz youth product, Toto began his senior career in Cameroon with Canon Yaoundé before moving to Italy to sign for Legnano. He moved to Scotland signing as an amateur for Greenock Morton before being quickly released. He moved to Singapore with Étoile in 2011 and then to under-23 side Courts Young Lions.

== Career ==
=== Youth level ===
Toto started his professional career in the youth teams at Metz. He holds French nationality.

=== Scotland ===
Heart of Midlothian manager Jim Jefferies brought Toto to Edinburgh on trial in August 2010 and was trying to finalise the deal with the FIGC over his registration after his last club Legnano were wound up. During his trial he appeared as a second-half substitute in a friendly against Premier League side Blackburn Rovers.

He spent the last part of 2010 on an amateur contract with Greenock Morton, in the hope of moving permanently to Hearts in January 2011. Allan Moore stated that he was unlikely to be kept on due to failing to find form, saying that:

"To be honest, I would have to say he's been disappointing".

As a result, Toto was released by Morton towards the end of 2010, and returned to the land of his birth.

=== Singapore ===
In March 2011, Toto signed for Étoile in the S.League in Singapore. After scoring 12 goals in 24 league games for Étoile, the club gave up their place in the S.League to concentrate on grass roots football. Toto signed for Courts Young Lions in January 2012. Young Lions had finished four places below Étoile the previous season.

=== Greece ===
In the first 2013 transfer window, Toto transferred to Greek side Doxa Drama in the second tier. Toto was released by Dramas at the end of the season having failed to score in 15 matches.

== See also ==
- 2010–11 Greenock Morton F.C. season
