= Théo Raymond =

French footballer (born 1991)

Personal information
- Full name: Théo Raymond
- Date of birth: 29 September 1991 (age 35)
- Place of birth: Toulouse, France
- Height: 1.86 m (6 ft 1 in)
- Position: Midfielder

Youth career
- –2009: Toulouse FC

Senior career*
Years	Team	Apps	(Gls)
2009–2010	Toulouse B		
2010–2011	AS Excelsior		
2011	Étoile FC	27	(6)
2012–2013	Toulouse Fontaines	5	(4)
2012–2013	FC Montreux-Sports	1	(0)
2012–2013	FC Monthey	12	(3)
2014	La Tamponnaise		
2014	Avenir Fonsorbais	5	(3)
2014	Fanja SC	1	(0)
2014–2015	AS Fabreguoise	6	(1)
2015	FC Jazz	13	(3)
2016–2018	AS Muret		
- * Club domestic league appearances and goals as of 01:13, 10 March 2020 (UTC)

Théo Raymond (born 29 September 1991) is a retired French association footballer. He plays as a midfielder.

== Career ==
At youth level, Raymond played for Toulouse FC B, the reserve team. In 2011, he was signed by S.League club Étoile FC for the 2011 S.League season, and made his debut in the 2 round, 0-0 game against Balestier Khalsa FC. In January 2014, he joined La Tamponnaise. He left the club in the summer 2014 when the club filed for bankruptcy.

In February 2016, Raymond joined French club AS Muret. In 2018 he stopped playing football and instead started playing rugby.
