= Akihiro Nakamura =

Japanese footballer

Personal information
- Date of birth: August 23, 1977 (age 49)
- Place of birth: Satte, Saitama, Japan
- Height: 1.71 m (5 ft 7 1/2 in)
- Position: Midfielder

Youth career
- Tokai University

Senior career*
Years	Team	Apps	(Gls)
2001–2002	Sembawang Rangers		
2003	SAFFC		
2004	Albirex Niigata (S)		
2005–2006	Balestier Khalsa	26	(2)
2007–2008	Woodlands Wellington	8	(2)
2009–2011	Tampines Rovers	91	(5)
2012	Eunos Crescent		
- * Club domestic league appearances and goals

Akihiro Nakamura (中村 彰宏, Nakamura Akihiro; born August 23, 1977) is a retired Japanese football player who last play for Singapore National Football League club, Eunos Crescent.

== Youth career ==
Nakamura played for his high school and university teams for Urayasu Tokai High School and Tokai University respectively.

== Club career ==
Nakamura have spent his entire professional football career in Singapore's S.League since he entered professional football with Sembawang Rangers in 2001 after passing a trial conducted by the team. He was a salaryman back in his native Japan prior to becoming a professional footballer. Nakamura has also played for SAFFC, Albirex Niigata Singapore, Balestier Khalsa, Woodlands Wellington and Tampines Rovers and also National Football League club, Eunos Crescent for one season. Nakamura has appeared 125 time for Tampines Rovers in all club competition.

In 2004, Nakamura signed for Albirex Niigata Singapore but was dropped after a poor season. In 2005, Balestier Khalsa signed Nakamura. During a S.League match against Albirex Niigata Singapore, Nakamura scored the only goal against his former club to help Balestier win the match 1-0.

He is currently also the general director for football academy called Global Football Academy (in Singapore) with an AFC B License.

== Personal life ==
Nakamura is married with a son and a daughter.
