= Queenstown Stadium =

Stadium in Singapore

- Pusat Sukan Queenstown (Malay) 女皇镇体育场 (Chinese) குவீன்ஸ்டவுன் விளையாட்டு அரங்கம் (Tamil)
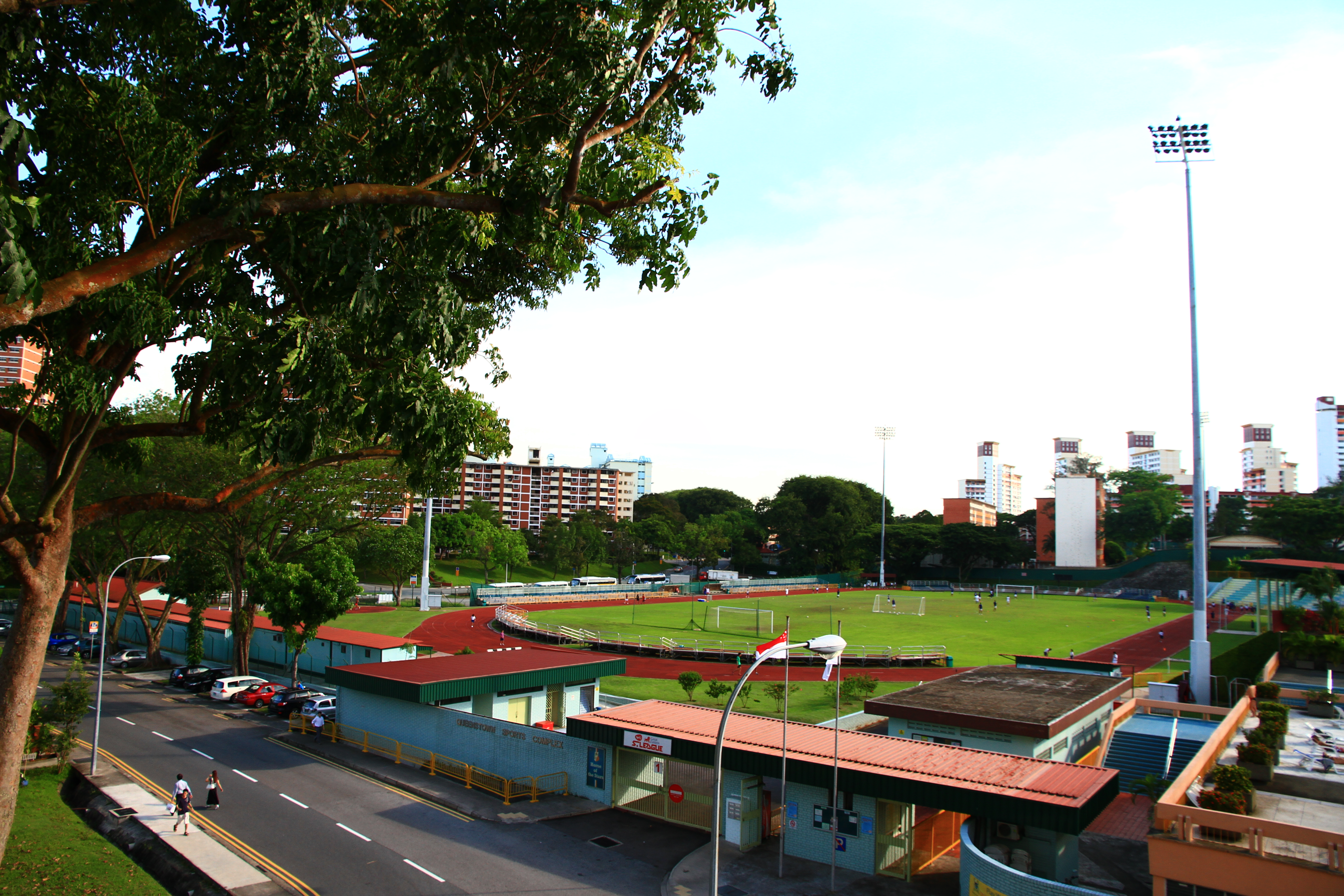
- Interactive map of Queenstown Stadium
- Full name: Queenstown ActiveSG Stadium
- Address: 473A Stirling Road, Singapore 148949
- Location: Queenstown, Singapore
- Coordinates: 1.2958°N 103.8025°E
- Owner: Sport Singapore
- Operator: Sport Singapore
- Capacity: 3,000 (1970-2012); 3,800 (present)
- Surface: Grass
- Scoreboard: Yes
- Public transit: EW19 Queenstown

Construction
- Opened: 15 August 1970; 56 years ago
- Renovated: 2012–2014, 2023–2026

Tenants
- Tanjong Pagar United (1970–2004), (2012–2014); Liaoning Guangyuan (2007–2008); Dalian Shide Siwu (2008); Étoile (2010–2011)

Queenstown Stadium is a multi-purpose stadium located in Queenstown, Singapore. It formerly served as the home ground of several Singapore Premier League football clubs, including Tanjong Pagar United, Liaoning Guangyuan FC, Dalian Shide Siwu FC, and Étoile FC. The stadium had also hosted football matches for various league competitions organised by the Football Association of Singapore (FAS).

The stadium is managed by Sport Singapore, and like most stadiums in Singapore, it is generally open to the public daily from 4.30am till 9.30pm, unless exclusively booked.

It had also served once as a venue for a general election rally by the opposition party SingFirst in 2015. The stadium was then located within Tanjong Pagar GRC, which had previously been uncontested before the 2015 general election.

== History ==
=== Early days ===
Queenstown Stadium is part of the Queenstown Sport Centre, a community sports facility that also includes the Queenstown Swimming Complex. It was the first sports centre to be built in Singapore, constructed at a cost of S$1.6 million on a ten acres site. Upon completion, the facility was taken over by the Singapore Sports Council on 2 January 1970 and was officially opened by Lim Kim San, then Minister for Education, on 15 August 1970.

The stadium hosted the Singapore Armed Forces' first Colour Parade in 1973. It subsequently served as one of the venues for the decentralised National Day Parade in 1975 and 1983, which was held at several locations across Singapore to enable more Singaporeans to participate in the celebrations.

=== Since 2000s ===
The stadium served as the home ground of numerous Singapore Premier League clubs over the years. Tanjong Pagar United FC used Queenstown Stadium as its home ground from 1970 to 2004, and again from 2012 to 2014, before the club was dissolved. Several foreign teams playing in the League including Liaoning Guangyuan FC from 2007 to 2008, Dalian Shide Siwu FC in 2008, and Étoile FC from 2010 to 2011 made the stadium their home ground too.

Queenstown Stadium underwent renovation in 2012. The Queenstown Sport Centre, including the stadium, subsequently underwent a second major refurbishment, which included the construction of a new annex building housing a gym and activity rooms. The sports centre reopened on 8 August 2026.

== Facilities & structures ==
The stadium currently has a seating capacity of 3,800, comprising 2,000 permanent, 1,000 semi-permanent, and 800 portable seats. Prior to its renovation in 2012, the stadium had a capacity of 3,000. Its facilities include a rugby field built to World Rugby standards, which replaced the former football field, as well as a running track and other athletic facilities.

== See also ==
- List of stadiums in Singapore
