= Firdaus Idros =

Singaporean footballer

Personal information
- Full name: Muhammad Firdaus bin Mohamed Idros
- Date of birth: 12 August 1986 (age 40)
- Place of birth: Singapore
- Height: 1.68 m (5 ft 6 in)
- Position: Midfielder

Team information
- Current team: Tampines Rovers FC
- Number: 8

Youth career
- 2000–2005: National Football Academy

Senior career*
Years	Team	Apps	(Gls)
2006–2008	Young Lions	2	(0)
2009–2013	Home United	141	(18)
2014	Tanjong Pagar United	2	(0)
2015–	Tampines Rovers	6	(1)

International career^{‡}
2011–	Singapore	4	(0)
- * Club domestic league appearances and goals ‡ National team caps and goals as of 9 February 2013

Muhammad Firdaus bin Mohamed Idros is a Singaporean footballer who plays as a winger for S.League side Tampines Rovers FC.

== Career ==
Firdaus had previously played for Home United from 2009 to 2013 and signed for Tampines Rovers FC in 2014.

Firdaus signed for the Stags for the 2015 S.League season.
