= Antonin Trilles =

French footballer (born 1983)

Personal information
- Date of birth: 20 July 1983 (age 43)
- Place of birth: Arles, France
- Height: 1.89 m (6 ft 2 in)
- Position: Goalkeeper

Senior career*
Years	Team	Apps	(Gls)
2001–2009	Arles-Avignon		
2009–2010	Gazélec Ajaccio	34	(0)
2010	Marignane	5	(0)
2011	Étoile FC	29	(0)
2012–2015	Bangkok United	49	(0)
2015–2016	Domžale	1	(0)
- * Club domestic league appearances and goals

Antonin Trilles (born 20 July 1983) is a French former professional footballer who played as a goalkeeper.

== Career ==
Trilles played for French clubs Marignane, Gazélec Ajaccio and Arles-Avignon, before signing for S.League club Etoile FC in February 2011.
