= Étoile FC =

Étoile
- Full name: Étoile Football Club
- Nickname: Gallic Rooster
- Founded: 2010
- Dissolved: 2012
- Ground: Queenstown Stadium; Queenstown, Singapore
- Capacity: 3,800
- League: S.League
- 2011: S.League, 5th of 12
Home colours	Away colours

Étoile Football Club was a professional football club from France based in Commonwealth, Singapore, that was formed to play in Singaporean S.League in 2010. Étoile was the first team of players all born in Europe to play football in Singapore's professional league, and the first in Asia. The club was mostly made up of players of French origin.

Étoile then made history by becoming the first foreign team to win S.league title, sealing the title on a dramatic final day with a 4–2 victory over Albirex Niigata (S). Étoile have won one league title, one Singapore League Cup and one Community Shield.

After pulling out of the S.League in 2012, Étoile was converted to Ètoile Football Academy based in Commonwealth, aiming to provide quality football coaching and development for individuals from all walks of life.

== History ==
Étoile was the 'brainchild' of ex-Gombak United midfielder Johan Gouttefangeas. He was the chairman of Étoile since its formation in 2010.

Étoile Football Cub became the eighth team defined by foreign team composition to compete in the S.League.

In its debut season, Étoile won the 2010 Singapore League Cup in a 3–1 win over Woodlands Wellington FC. The club then won 3rd place in the 2010 Singapore Cup.

Étoile became the first foreign team to win the S.League title following a 4–2 win over Albirex Niigata (S) at the Jurong East Stadium on the final day. Kazuki Kobayashi had scored twice to give the Japanese satellite team a 2–1 lead at half time and then goals by Frédéric Mendy and Matthias Verschave sealed the title win for Étoile. Mendy went on to become the 2010 S.League top scorer with 21 goals.

In June 2011, Johan relinquished his position as chairman and Hicham Moudden took over. Étoile finished seventh in the 2011 S.League season.

In 2012, Ludovic Casset stepped up as chairman.

Étoile pulled out of the S.League for the 2012 season to focus on grassroots football and youth development with the creation of Étoile Academy.

=== Grassroots football ===
Étoile Academy bases itself on three core principles: Grassroots football is football for all, play is the best means of learning – above all, youngsters should have fun and children are not just miniature adults.

They were sponsored by Lufthansa Technik in 2017.

== Controversy ==
During the 2011 S.League match between Étoile and Hougang United on 23 May 2011, several Étoile players were involved in the controversial match against Hougang United which was called off before kick-off when an all in brawl erupted during the pre-match warm up. Details of the fracas are sketchy, however it is believed the fight started when goalkeeper Hadama Bathily entered the Hougang's warm up area to retrieve a miss-kicked ball. Bathily then attacked Hougang's assistant coach Hasrin Jailani after it was claimed by Bathily that he was racially abused by Jailani. Both teams then rushed to defend their respective team members where the fight escalated. As a result of the fracas, Basit Abdul Hamid and the Hougang assistant coach were taken to hospital, whilst Étoile players Franklin Anzite and Bathily were also taken to hospital.

After a week-long disciplinary hearing from the Football Association of Singapore, which took 5 sessions, a total of 18+ hours, finally reached a verdict. Both clubs were docked 5 points each, and fined $10,000, of which $5,000 is suspended until the end of the 2011 S.League season, dependent on each clubs good behaviour. Three Hougang United members were charged with gross misconduct which brought the game into disrepute. Assistant coach Jailani was fined $1,000, charged with using vulgar language and received a 3-match touchline ban. Hougang's captain Shariff Abdul Samat was fined $1,500 and charged with committing an act of violence upon Bathily, and received a 5-match suspension. Fathi Yunus was cleared of all charges by the tribunal.

Bathili himself was charged with committing an act of violence upon the Hougang assistant coach, was fined $2,000 and received a 7-match ban, whilst Bathili's teammate Serge Souchon-Koguia was charged with committing an assault on Hougang player Basit Abdul Hamid, fined $1,500 and received a 5-match ban.

== Honours ==
=== League ===
- S.League
  - Champions (1): 2010

=== Cup ===
- Singapore League Cup
  - Champions (1): 2010
- Singapore Charity Shield
  - Runners-up (1): 2011

== Personal awards ==
- League Top Scorer
  - (France) Frédéric Mendy (2010)
- League Golden Gloves
  - (France) Yohann Lacroix (2010)

== Seasons ==
Season	Pos.	Pl.	W	D	L	GS	GA	P	Singapore Cup	League Cup	Top goalscorer		Managers
2010	1st	33	21	7	5	54	23	70	Third Place	Winners	(France) Frédéric Mendy	21	(France) Patrick Vallée
2011	5th	33	21	4	8	65	36	62	Third Place	Quarter-finals	(France) Jonathan Toto	10	(Italy) Guglielmo Arena

== Records and statistics ==
=== Top 10 all-time appearances ===
Rank	Player	Years	Club appearances
1	(France) Anthony Moulin	2010–2011	46
2	(Central African Republic) Serge Souchon-Koguia	2010–2011	45
3	(France) Andréa Damiani	2010–2012	44
4	(France) Nordine Talhi	2010–2011	40
5	(France) Julien Delétraz	2010–2011	37
5	(France) Cyril Bagnost	2010–2011	37
5	(Guinea-Bissau) Frédéric Mendy	2010	37
8	(Cameroon) Pierre Nlaté	2011	36
9	(France) Antonin Trilles	2011	35
9	(France) Matthias Verschave	2010	35
9	(France) Maxime Belouet	2011–2012	35
9	(France) Sirina Camara	2011	35

=== Top 10 all-time scorers ===
Rank	Player	Club appearances	Total goals
1	(Guinea-Bissau) Frédéric Mendy	37	24
2	(France) Jonathan Toto	28	14
3	(France) Kamel Chaaouane	23	10
3	(France) Matthias Verschave	35	10
5	(France) Maxime Belouet	35	8
7	(Guinea) Aly Doumbouya	20	7
7	(France) Wilson Grosset	29	7
7	(France) Théo Raymond	32	7
7	(France) Karim Boudjema	33	7
7	(France) Anthony Moulin	46	7

- Biggest Wins: 6–1 vs Tanjong Pagar United (On 26 September 2011)
- Heaviest Defeats: 2–7 vs Albirex Niigata (S) (On 7 September 2011)
- Youngest Goal scorers: Théo Raymond ~ 19 years 6 months 16 days old (On 14 April 2011 vs Home United)
- Oldest Goal scorers: Aly Doumbouya ~ 33 years 4 months 7 days old (On 25 November 2011 vs Albirex Niigata Singapore)
- Youngest ever debutant: Stan Fougeroud ~ 19 years 2 months 29 days old (On 17 February 2011 vs Geylang United)
