= 2012 Woodlands Wellington FC season =

Woodlands Wellington
2012 season
- Chairman: (Singapore) Hussainar K. Abdul Aziz
- Coach: (Singapore) Salim Moin (head coach); (Singapore) Clement Teo (assistant coach)
- S-League: 13th
- RHB Singapore Cup: 1st round
- Starhub League Cup: Plate Semi-Finalists
- Top goalscorer: League: (South Korea) Moon Soon-Ho (9); All: (South Korea) Moon Soon-Ho (10)
- Highest home attendance: 688 vs Hougang United (30 March 2012)
- Lowest home attendance: 277 vs Balestier Khalsa (20 July 2012)
Home colours	Away colours	Third colours

The 2012 season was Woodlands Wellington's 17th competitive and consecutive season in the top flight of Singapore football and 25th year in existence as a football club.

== Review ==
In the pre season, captain Sazali Salleh left the club for Tampines Rovers on 1 January 2012. Sazali played 54 times for the Rams between 2010 and 2011, and he had appeared a total of 158 times in total for Woodlands. Goalkeeper Ahmadulhaq Che Omar and defender Daniel Hammond rejoin Woodlands Wellington for the second time. Ahmadulhaq spent two seasons with Balestier Khalsa while Hammond joins the Rams from Geylang United.

On 12 January, coach R. Balasubramaniam, whose contract expired end of December 2011, was not given a new contract. On 13 January, former Balestier Khalsa coach, Salim Moin, was appointed as the head coach of Woodlands Wellington.

The Rams' first match in the 2012 S.League is a goalless draw against Gombak United, ending a three-game losing streak for the Rams. On 15 April, the Rams lost 2–1 loss to Harimau Muda A, who swapped places with the Young Lions and joined the S. League for one season. Four penalty kicks were awarded in the game, with three in favour of the Young Tigers. Woodlands custodian Ahmadulhaq Che Omar managed to keep Wan Zack Haikal's 37th minute spot kick out, but Gary Robbat and Affize Faisal made no mistake with their penalties to ensure that Harimau Muda emerged winners in a match laden with yellow cards and a sending off for Woodlands winger Goh Swee Swee.

- 19 May 2012: Woodlands Wellington is knocked out of the RHB Singapore Cup following a 2–1 loss to Kanbawza FC in the first round. The match was played at Jalan Besar Stadium as Kanbawza FC was denoted as the home team.
- 15 June 2012: Courts Young Lions and Woodlands Wellington agree on the transfer of Navin Neil Vanu. Neil is assigned jersey number 34 for the Rams.
- 21 June 2012: Woodlands Wellington draws 1–1 with Geylang United at Bedok Stadium to arrest a five match losing streak. The match also saw Neil Vanu start his first game for Woodlands in 2012 upon his return to the Rams after his stint with the Courts Young Lions.
- 11 July 2012: Referee Leow Thiam Hoe hands out 5 yellow cards to Woodlands in their 2–0 loss to Albirex Niigata (S), setting the current record for the most number of cards handed out to Woodlands Wellington in a single match during the 2012 season. The five yellow cards also meant that Woodlands would be slapped with an automatic fine of S$500 for receiving at least that many cautions in a single match, in accordance with league regulations.
- 12 July 2012: The Starhub League Cup draw was made at Jalan Besar Stadium, and Woodlands was drawn into group D together with Tampines Rovers and Gombak United. The 2012 edition of the Cup, which will run from July 26 to August 11, 2012, will be played in a new format that will see four groups of three teams each battle it out for a place in the semi-finals. The four teams that finish third in their respective groups will also play in a separate Plate Competition consisting of two semi-finals and a final.
- 20 July 2012: Woodlands Wellington sees their lowest attendance this season with only 277 fans attending their match against Balestier Khalsa. The match also resulted in Woodlands' third loss in a row after consecutive losses to Albirex Niigata (S) and Tampines Rovers before this match. Woodlands custodian Ahmadulhaq Che Omar makes his second penalty save of the season in the same match.
- 30 July 2012: Woodlands Wellington draws their second game of the Starhub League Cup preliminary round with Gombak United and remain rooted to the bottom of Group D, leaving their fate of advancing to the quarter-finals to be decided by the match between Gombak United and Tampines Rovers on 2 August.
- 2 August 2012: Gombak United and Tampines Rovers draw their League Cup preliminary round match and both teams advance to the quarter-finals. Woodlands Wellington finish bottom of the Group D table and advance to the semi-finals of the newly created Plate Competition.
- 6 August 2012: Woodlands Wellington crashes out of the League Cup Plate Competition after losing 1–0 to Balestier Khalsa in the semi-final, conceding a 67th goal to former Ram Zulkiffli Hassim.
- 26 August 2012: Woodlands's 1–2 loss to Gombak United marks their 20th game of the season without a win.
- 21 October 2012: Ahmadulhaq Che Omar's save against Ivan Jerković's penalty was his third penalty save of the season. The 1–2 loss against DPMM in the same match also meant that the Rams would finish the 2012 season as the wooden spoonists for the third season in a row.
- 25 October 2012: The Rams pick up their fifth draw of the season, ending their match against Home United with a 0–0 scoreline following 3 consecutive losses against SAFFC, Harimau Muda and DPMM.
- 4 November 2012: Woodlands Wellington's final match day 3–2 win over Tanjong Pagar United gets them only their third win of the season. All of the Rams' three goals were scored within the first 12 minutes of the match.

== Team Kits ==
The team kits for 2012 were produced by Thai sports apparel maker, Acono.

Home
Away
Third Kit
Training Kit
Goalkeeper Home
Goalkeeper Away
Goalkeeper 3rd / Training Kit
Club Officials' Kit
Club Officials' Polo

== Transfers ==
=== In ===
==== Pre-season ====
Position	Player	Transferred from	Date	Source
GK	(Singapore) Ahmadulhaq Che Omar	(Singapore) Balestier Khalsa	1 January 2012	
DF	(Singapore) K. Sathiaraj	(Singapore) Balestier Khalsa	1 January 2012	
MF	(Singapore) Armanizam Dolah	(Singapore) Balestier Khalsa	1 January 2012	
MF	(Singapore) Shamsurin Abdul Rahman	(Singapore) Balestier Khalsa	1 January 2012	
MF	(Singapore) Hilmi Azman	(Singapore) Balestier Khalsa	1 January 2012	
FW	(Singapore) Farizal Basri	(Singapore) Home United	1 January 2012	
DF	(England) Daniel Hammond	(Singapore) Geylang United	1 January 2012	
DF	(Singapore) Danny Chew Ji Xiang	Free Transfer	1 January 2012	
DF	(Singapore) Vincent Lee	(Singapore) SAFFC	1 January 2012	
DF	(Trinidad and Tobago) Fabien Lewis	Free Transfer	11 January 2012	
MF	(Lebanon) Hussein Akil	(Australia) Sydney Olympic	11 January 2012	

==== Mid-season ====
Position	Player	Transferred from	Date	Source
MF	(Singapore) Aloysius Yap	(Singapore) Gombak United	10 March 2012	
DF	(Singapore) Edward Tan	(Singapore) Tampines Rovers	25 March 2012	
FW	(Singapore) Navin Neil Vanu	(Singapore) Courts Young Lions	15 June 2012	

=== Out ===
==== Pre-season ====
Position	Player	Transferred To	Date	Source
DF	(Lebanon) Munier Raychouni	Released	1 January 2012	
DF	(Singapore) Sahairi Ramri	(Singapore) Siglap CSC	1 January 2012	
MF	(Singapore) Nawfal Shahib	Singapore Recreation Club	1 January 2012	
DF	(Japan) Fumiya Kobayashi	Released	1 January 2012	
GK	(Singapore) Phang Chin Guan	Singapore Recreation Club	1 January 2012	
MF	(Singapore) Syed Karim	(Singapore) Tanjong Pagar United FC	1 January 2012	
MF	(South Korea) Hyun Jong-Woon	Released	1 January 2012	
MF	(Singapore) Jalal	(Singapore) Geylang United	1 January 2012	
MF	(Singapore) Shahri Musa	Released	1 January 2012	
DF	(Singapore) Madhu Mohana	(Singapore) LionsXII	1 January 2012	
MF	(Singapore) Sazali Salleh	(Singapore) Tampines Rovers	1 January 2012	
DF	(Singapore) Darrel Tan	Singapore Cricket Club	1 January 2012	

==== Mid-season ====
Position	Player	Transferred To	Date	Source
MF	(Singapore) Hilmi Azman	Released	1 April 2012	Woodlands Wellington Football Club
DF	(Singapore) Vincent Lee	Retirement	15 June 2012	Woodlands Wellington Football Club
DF	(Singapore) Edward Tan	Retirement	30 June 2012	Woodlands Wellington Football Club
MF	(Singapore) Aloysius Yap	Retirement	15 August 2012	Woodlands Wellington Football Club

== Squads ==
=== First Team Squad ===
No.	Name	Nationality	Position (s)	Date of birth (age)	Signed from (year signed)
Goalkeepers
1	Ahmadulhaq Che Omar	(Singapore)	GK	11 February 1981 (age 45)	(Singapore) Balestier Khalsa (2012)
18	Ang Bang Heng	(Singapore)	GK	21 August 1980 (age 46)	(Singapore) Katong Football Club (2011)
Defenders
2	Danny Chew Ji Xiang	(Singapore)	RB / FB	6 November 1987 (age 39)	Free Transfer (2012)
3	Duncan David Elias (Vice Captain)	(Singapore)	LB / LM	14 July 1985 (age 41)	(Singapore) Hougang United (2011)
4	Fabien Lewis	(Trinidad and Tobago)	CB	10 August 1982 (age 44)	Free Transfer (2012)
5	Daniel Hammond (Captain)	(England)	CB	6 April 1985 (age 41)	(Singapore) Geylang United (2012)
12	K. Sathiaraj	(Singapore)	LB / RB / DMC	15 October 1986 (age 40)	(Singapore) Balestier Khalsa (2012)
Midfielders
6	Armanizam Dolah	(Singapore)	DMC / MC	26 November 1987 (age 38)	(Singapore) Balestier Khalsa (2012)
7	Guntur Djafril	(Singapore)	ML / WL / AMC	3 April 1985 (age 41)	(Singapore) SAFFC (2010)
8	Han Yiguang	(Singapore)	DMC / MC	2 February 1985 (age 41)	(Singapore) Balestier Khalsa (2011)
11	Shamsurin Abdul Rahman	(Singapore)	MC / AMC	27 November 1986 (age 39)	(Singapore) Balestier Khalsa (2012)
13	Aloysius Yap	(Singapore)	MC / AMC	20 October 1987 (age 39)	(Singapore) Gombak United (2012)
20	Hussein Akil	(Lebanon)	MC / SS	3 May 1990 (age 36)	(Australia) Sydney Olympic (2012)
Forwards
9	Goh Swee Swee	(Singapore)	WR / ST	2 June 1986 (age 40)	(Singapore) Balestier Khalsa (2011)
10	Moon Soon-Ho	(South Korea)	FW	15 March 1981 (age 45)	(South Korea) Cheonan City FC (2011)
17	Farizal Basri	(Singapore)	FW / SS	15 March 1981 (age 45)	(Singapore) Home United (2012)
34	Navin Neil Vanu	(Singapore)	ST / WL / WR	11 August 1989 (age 37)	(Singapore) Courts Young Lions (2012)

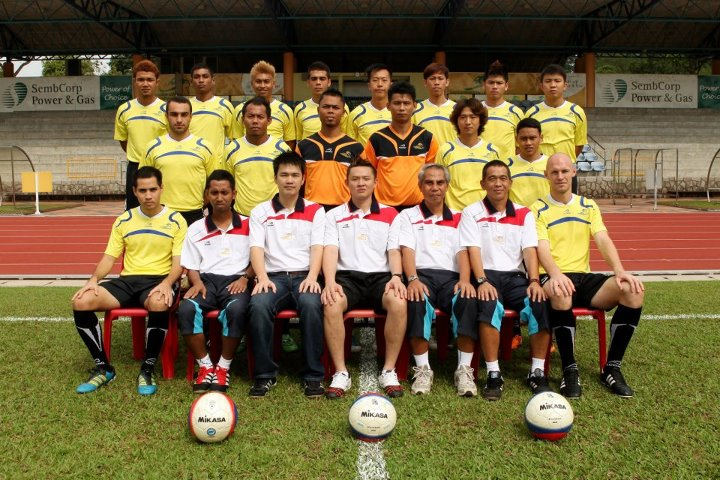
Woodlands Wellington 2012 First Team Squad, pictured here in their yellow home strip.

== Club ==
=== Coaching staff ===
Position	Name
Team manager	(Singapore) Matthew Michael Tay
Head coach	(Singapore) Salim Moin
Assistant coach	(Singapore) Clement Teo
Goalkeeping coach	(Singapore) Matthew Michael Tay
Prime League Coach	(Croatia) Marko Kraljević
Centre of Excellence Head Coach	(Singapore) Mohd Sani Kadim

Last updated: 20 June 2012
Source: http://www.sleague.com/clubs-profile/woodlands/club-profile

=== Boardroom Staff ===
Position	Name
Chairman	(Singapore) Hussainar K. Abdul Aziz
Vice-Chairman	(Singapore) Winson Song Ying Kong
Honorary Treasurer	(Singapore) Keith Tee Tan
Club manager	Vacant
Operations executive	(Singapore) Joe Wong
Accounts Executive	(Singapore) Frances Chow
Accounts Executive	(Singapore) William Lam

Last updated: 25 October 2012
Source: http://www.sleague.com/clubs-profile/woodlands/club-profile

== Pre-season and friendlies ==
10 January 2012	Geylang United (Singapore)	1–2	(Singapore) Woodlands Wellington	Bedok Stadium
	Faizal Samad 80'	Report	20' Guntur Djafril; 51' Hussein Akil

14 January 2012	Woodlands Wellington (Singapore)	1–0	(Singapore) Gombak United	Woodlands Stadium
	Moon Soon-Ho 75'	Report

3 February 2012	Woodlands Wellington (Singapore)	2–0	(Singapore) Katong Football Club	Woodlands Stadium
	Farizal Basri; Armanizam Dolah

20 April 2012	Woodlands Wellington (Singapore)	4–0	(Singapore) Katong Football Club	Woodlands Stadium
	Farizal Basri 24'; Armanizam Dolah 41'; Guntur Djafril 60'; Goh Swee Swee 78'	Report

22 May 2012	Woodlands Wellington (Singapore)	1–1	(Malaysia) Johor FA	Woodlands Stadium
17:00	(pen) Goh Swee Swee 36'	Report	83' Ashadi Yusoff

7 June 2012	Hougang United (Singapore)	2–1	(Singapore) Woodlands Wellington	Hougang Stadium
	Stanislav Vidakovic 45'; Syaqir Sulaiman 55'		91' Edward Tan

27 June 2012	Woodlands Wellington (Singapore)	2–0	(Singapore) Admiralty FC	Woodlands Stadium
19:00	Daniel Hammond; Moon Soon-Ho

3 July 2012	Singapore LionsXII	2–0	(Singapore) Woodlands Wellington	Jalan Besar Stadium
19:00	Irwan Shah 70'; Khairul Nizam 85'

== S.League ==
=== S.League table ===
Pos	Team	Pld	W	D	L	GF	GA	GD	Pts
9	Gombak United	24	7	8	9	23	29	−6	29
10	(Singapore) Young Lions (Note: The three foreign clubs – Albirex Niigata (S), DPMM FC and Harimau Muda A – as well as the Football Association of Singapore (FAS) under-23 team, Young Lions, are not eligible for any AFC competition spots.)	24	6	5	13	25	37	−12	23
11	Geylang United	24	5	6	13	28	50	−22	21
12	Tanjong Pagar United	24	5	5	14	17	41	−24	20
13	Woodlands Wellington	24	3	5	16	19	44	−25	14

Source: RSSSF
Rules for classification: 1) points; 2) goal difference; 3) number of goals scored; 4) number of wins

=== S.League results summary ===
Overall								Home						Away					
Pld	W	D	L	GF	GA	GD	Pts	W	D	L	GF	GA	GD	W	D	L	GF	GA	GD
24	3	5	16	19	44	−25	14	1	2	9	9	21	−12	2	3	7	10	23	−13

Last updated: 4 November 2012.
Source: S-League

=== S.League results by round ===
Round	1	2	3	4	5	6	7	8	9	10	11	12	13	14	15	16	17	18	19	20	21	22	23	24
Ground	A	H	H	A	A	A	H	H	A	A	A	H	H	A	A	H	H	H	A	A	H	H	H	A
Result	W	W	L	L	L	D	L	D	L	L	L	L	L	D	L	L	L	L	D	L	L	L	D	W

Updated to match(es) played on 4 November 2012. Source: Matches and sleague.com
A = Away; H = Home; W = Win; D = Draw; L = Loss

=== S.League Matches ===
12 February 2012 1	Courts Young Lions	0–1	Woodlands Wellington	Jalan Besar Stadium
19:45 GMT+8	Gary Loo (yellow card) 20'; Syazwan Buhari (yellow card) 48'; Sherif El-Masri (yellow card) 69'; Benjamin Kristoffersen Lee (yellow card) 74'; Navin Neil Vanu (yellow card) 80'	Report	(yellow card) 16' Han Yiguang; 49' Moon Soon-Ho (pen); (yellow card) 68' Goh Swee Swee; (yellow card) 74' Farizal Basri; (yellow card) 91' K. Sathiaraj	Attendance: 668; Referee: Ahmad A'Qashah

19 February 2012 2	Woodlands Wellington	3–1	Geylang United	Woodlands Stadium
19:45 GMT+8	Hussein Akil 59'; Goh Swee Swee 70'; Moon Soon-Ho 88'	Report	(yellow card) 11' Zul Elhan Fahmi; 83' Muhammad Danial Bin Razali	Attendance: 429; Referee: W. Ravisanthiran

1 March 2012 3	Woodlands Wellington	0–1	Albirex Niigata (S)	Jalan Besar Stadium
19:45 GMT+8	Guntur Djafril (yellow card) 62'; K. Sathiaraj (yellow card) 68'; Duncan Elias (yellow card) 93'	Report	92' Yamakoshi Yasuhiro	Attendance: 557; Referee: Sukhbir Singh

9 March 2012 4	Tampines Rovers	4–0	Woodlands Wellington	Clementi Stadium
19:45 GMT+8	Aleksandar Duric 1'; Aleksandar Duric 24'; Mustafic Fahrudin 36'; Aleksandar Duric 51'; Aleksandar Duric (yellow card) 61'	Report	(yellow card) 90' K. Sathiaraj	Attendance: 1,228; Referee: Muhd Taqi

18 March 2012 5	Balestier Khalsa	2–0	Woodlands Wellington	Toa Payoh Stadium
19:45 GMT+8	Kim Minho 80'; Ruhaizad Ismail 83'; Zulkiffli Hassim (red card) 93'	Report	(yellow card) 77' Duncan Elias; (yellow card) 80' Moon Soon-Ho; (yellow card) 93' Goh Swee Swee	Attendance: 1,913; Referee: K. Kalimuthu

24 March 2012 6	Gombak United	0–0	Woodlands Wellington	Jurong West Stadium
19:45 GMT+8	Samuel Benjamin (yellow card) 49'; Nurullah Hussein (yellow card) 62'; Nur Naiim Ishak (yellow card) 85'	Report	(yellow card) 40' Vincent Lee	Attendance: 961; Referee: W. Ravisanthiran

30 March 2012 7	Woodlands Wellington	1–3	Hougang United	Woodlands Stadium
19:45 GMT+8	Han Yiguang (yellow card) 20'; Farizal Basri (yellow card) 42'; Goh Swee Swee 71'; Hussein Akil (yellow card) 72'; K. Sathiaraj (yellow card) 77'	Report	(yellow card) 7' Stanislav Vidaković; 28' Jordan Webb; 49' Jordan Webb (pen); (yellow card) 53' Sobrie Mazelan; 56' Stanislav Vidaković; (yellow card) 61' Mamadou Diallo; (yellow card) 68' Lau Meng Meng	Attendance: 688; Referee: K. Kalimuthu

5 April 2012 8	Woodlands Wellington	2–2	SAFFC	Jalan Besar Stadium
19:45 GMT+8	Moon Soon-Ho 15'; Edward Tan (yellow card) 60'; Moon Soon-Ho 15'	Report	(yellow card) 15' Shahril Jantan; 21' Mislav Karoglan; (yellow card) 37' Noh Rahman; 67' Ruzaini Zainal; (yellow card) 90' Ruzaini Zainal	Attendance: 538; Referee: W. Ravisanthiran

15 April 2012 9	Harimau Muda	2–1	Woodlands Wellington	Yishun Stadium
19:45 GMT+8	Fadhli Shas (yellow card) 21'; Izham Tarmizi (yellow card) 22' (pen) Gary Robbat 57' (pen)) Affize Faisal 70'; Amer Saidin (yellow card) 78'; Wan Zack Haikal (yellow card) 87'	Report	(yellow card) 26' Armanizam Dolah; 23' Moon Soon-Ho (pen); (yellow card) 42' Goh Swee Swee; (yellow card) 69' (red card) Goh Swee Swee	Attendance: 388; Referee: K. Kalimuthu

27 April 2012 10	DPMM	3–0	Woodlands Wellington	Sultan Hassanal Bolkiah Stadium
20:15 GMT+8	Shahrazen Said 4'; Rodrigo Grahl 29' (pen) Rodrigo Grahl 63'	Report	(yellow card) 73' Armanizam Dolah; (yellow card) 83' Han Yiguang	Referee: Yazeen Buhari

5 May 2012 11	Home United	3–1	Woodlands Wellington	Bishan Stadium
19:45 GMT+8	Frederic Mendy 42'; Frederic Mendy 47'; Rosman Sulaiman (yellow card) 52'; Frederic Mendy 79'	Report	(yellow card) 22' K. Sathiaraj; 45' Hussein Akil; (yellow card) 87' Armanizam Dolah	Referee: K Kalimuthu

11 May 2012 12	Woodlands Wellington	0–1	Tanjong Pagar United	Woodlands Stadium
19:45 GMT+8	Fabien Lewis (yellow card) 49'; Daniel Hammond (yellow card) 81'	Report	18' Serge Souchon; (yellow card) 28' Jonathan Xu; (yellow card) 59' (red card) Jonathan Xu; (yellow card) 88' Zahid Ahmad	Attendance: 474; Referee: Muhd Taqi

15 June 2012 13	Woodlands Wellington	1–2	Courts Young Lions	Woodlands Stadium
19:45 GMT+8	Moon Soon-Ho 14'; Han Yiguang (yellow card) 40'; Han Yiguang (yellow card) 80' (red card)	Report	(yellow card) 31' Faritz Abdul Hameed; 77' Nazrul Nazari; (yellow card) 87' Faris Ramli	Attendance: 349; Referee: Abdul Malik

21 June 2012 14	Geylang United	1–1	Woodlands Wellington	Bedok Stadium
19:45 GMT+8	(pen) Jozef Kapláň 68'	Report	22' Hussein Akil; (yellow card) 46' Danny Chew Ji Xiang; (yellow card) 69' Aloysius Yap	Attendance: 414; Referee: Sukhbir Singh

11 July 2012 15	Albirex Niigata (S)	2–0	Woodlands Wellington	Jurong East Stadium
19:45 GMT+8	Atsushi Shimono 26'; Kunihiro Yamashita 51'; Takeshi Ito (yellow card) 69'	Report	(yellow card) 59' Farizal Basri; (yellow card) 64' Hussein Akil; (yellow card) 81' Daniel Hammond; (yellow card) 86' Neil Vanu; (yellow card) 89' Fabien Lewis	Referee: Leow Thiam Hoe

17 July 2012 16	Woodlands Wellington	0–3	Tampines Rovers	Woodlands Stadium
19:45 GMT+8	Farizal Basri (yellow card) 26'; Goh Swee Swee (yellow card) 28'	Report	26' Sead Hadžibulić; 39' Sead Hadžibulić; (yellow card) 45' Anaz Abdul Hadee; 84' Sead Hadžibulić	Referee: Yazeen Buhari

20 July 2012 17	Woodlands Wellington	0–2	Balestier Khalsa	Woodlands Stadium
19:45 GMT+8	Ahmadulhaq Che Omar (yellow card) 36'; Duncan Elias (yellow card) 77'; Han Yiguang (yellow card) 86'	Report	(yellow card) 15' Jaslee Hatta; 47' Zdravko Dragićević; (yellow card) 56' Yusiskandar Yusop; (yellow card) 72' Ruhaizad Ismail; (yellow card) 75' Zukiffli Hassim; 82' Paul Cunningham; (yellow card) 86' Tengku Mushadad; (red card) 93' Zukiffli Hassim	Attendance: 277; Referee: Muhd Taqi

26 August 2012 18	Woodlands Wellington	1–2	Gombak United	Woodlands Stadium
19:45 GMT+8	Ang Bang Heng (red card) 59'; Daniel Hammond (yellow card) 76'; Oswind Suriya 87'	Details; Report	(yellow card) 20' Ismail Yunos; (yellow card) 22' Adrian Dhanaraj; 63' Hafiz Rahim (pen); 83' Mustaqim Manzur	Attendance: 283; Referee: P M Jeevanathan

1 September 2012 19	Hougang United	2–2	Woodlands Wellington	Hougang Stadium
19:45 GMT+8	Sobrie Mazelan 7'; Fazli Jaffar 23'; Nurhilmi Jasni (yellow card) 71'; Faizal Amir (yellow card) 81'	Details; Report	35' Goh Swee Swee; 57' Daniel Hammond	Referee: K Kalimuthu

13 September 2012 20	SAFFC	2–1	Woodlands Wellington	Choa Chu Kang Stadium
19:45 GMT+8	Shukor Zailan 36'; Noh Rahman (yellow card) 67'; Mislav Karoglan 71'	Details; Report	(yellow card) 19' Duncan Elias; 82' Moon Soon-Ho	Referee: W Ravisanthiran

22 September 2012 21	Woodlands Wellington	0–2	Harimau Muda	Woodlands Stadium
19:45 GMT+8	Han Yiguang (yellow card) 41'	Details; Report	69' Thamil Arasu; 88' Thamil Arasu	Referee: W Ravisanthiran

21 October 2012 22	Woodlands Wellington	1–2	DPMM	Woodlands Stadium
19:45 GMT+8	Zulkarnain Malik (yellow card) 6'; Guntur Djafril 26'; Duncan Elias (yellow card) 41'; Farizal Basri (yellow card) 57'; Zulkarnain Malik (yellow card) 84' (red card)	Details; Report	(yellow card) 20' Subhi Abdilah; 43' Shahrazen Said; 69' Rosmin Kamis; (yellow card) 89' Shahrazen Said	Referee: Muhd Taqi

25 October 2012 23	Woodlands Wellington	0–0	Home United	Jalan Besar Stadium
19:45 GMT+8	Danny Chew (yellow card) 49'; Armanizam Dolah (yellow card) 86'	Details; Report	(yellow card) 55' Song Ui Young	Referee: Ahmad A'Qashah

4 November 2012 24	Tanjong Pagar United	2–3	Woodlands Wellington	Queenstown Stadium
19:45 GMT+8	Hanafi Salleh (yellow card) 11'; Asraf Rashid 35' (pen) Takaya Kawanabe 59'; Takaya Kawanabe (yellow card) 74'; Delwinder Singh (yellow card) 86'	Details	3' Moon Soon-Ho; 5' Goh Swee Swee; 12' Moon Soon-Ho (pen); (yellow card) 34' Han Yiguang; (yellow card) 58' Fabien Lewis	Referee: Muhd Taqi

== RHB Singapore Cup ==
=== First round ===
19 May 2012 First Round	Kanbawza FC (Myanmar)	2–1	(Singapore) Woodlands Wellington	Jalan Besar Stadium
19:45 GMT+8	Soe Min Oo 3' (pen) Ternio Nunes Machado 61'; Zin Myo Aung (yellow card) 67'; Samuel Hanson (yellow card) 75'	Report	(yellow card) 60' Danny Chew; 65' Moon Soon-Ho (pen)	Referee: Muhd Taqi

== Starhub League Cup ==
On 12 July 2012, Woodlands was drawn into Group D of the Starhub League Cup together with Tampines Rovers and Gombak United. The 2012 edition of the Cup, which will run from July 26 to August 11, 2012, will be played in a new format that will see four groups of three teams each battle it out for a place in the semi-finals. The four teams that finish third in their respective groups will also play in a separate Plate Competition consisting of two semi-finals and a final.

Woodlands loses their first Starhub League Cup preliminary round match to Tampines Rovers with a 3–1 defeat before drawing their second game with Gombak United and finished bottom of Group D, leaving their fate of advancing to the quarter-finals to be decided by the match between Gombak United and Tampines Rovers on 2 August. Gombak United and Tampines Rovers drew their League Cup preliminary round match and both teams advance to the quarter-finals while Woodlands, as the bottom placed team of Group D table, advance to the semi-finals of the newly created Plate Competition to face Balestier Khalsa on 6 August 2012.

Woodlands Wellington crashed out of the League Cup Plate Competition on 6 August 2012 after losing 1–0 to Balestier Khalsa in the semi-final, conceding a 67th goal to former Ram Zulkiffli Hassim.

=== Group D ===
Pos	Team	Pld	W	D	L	GF	GA	GD	Pts
1	Tampines Rovers (A)	2	1	1	0	4	2	+2	4
2	Gombak United (A)	2	0	2	0	2	2	0	2
3	Woodlands Wellington	2	0	1	1	2	4	−2	1

Updated to match(es) played on 2 August 2012. Source: sleague.com
Rules for classification: 1) points; 2) goal difference; 3) number of goals scored.
(A) Advance to a further round

=== Preliminary round ===
27 July 2012 Preliminary Round	Tampines Rovers	3–1	Woodlands Wellington	Clementi Stadium
20:30 GMT+8	Jamil Ali 51'; Aleksandar Đurić 55'; Aleksandar Đurić 68'	Report	(yellow card) 58' Farizal Basri; 66' Aloysius Yap	Referee: Ahmad A'Qashah

30 July 2012 Preliminary Round	Woodlands Wellington	1–1	Gombak United	Woodlands Stadium
20:30 GMT+8	Daniel Hammond 25'	Report	22' Walid Lounis; (yellow card) 42' Iqbal Hamid Hussain; (yellow card) 70' (red card) Iqbal Hamid Hussain	Referee: W Ravisanthiran

=== Plate Competition Semi-Final ===
6 August 2012	Balestier Khalsa (Singapore)	1–0	(Singapore) Woodlands Wellington	Toa Payoh Stadium
20:30	Hamqaamal Shah (yellow card) 53'; Zulkiffli Hassim 67'; Paul Cunningham (yellow card) 69'; Poh Yifeng (yellow card) 92'	Report	(yellow card) 18' Goh Swee Swee; (yellow card) 50' Han Yiguang; (yellow card) 93' (red card) Han Yiguang	Referee: Muhd Taqi

== First Team Statistics ==
=== Appearances and goals ===
No.	Pos	Nat	Player	Total		S-League		RHB Singapore Cup		Starhub League Cup	
No.	Pos	Nat	Player	Apps	Goals	Apps	Goals	Apps	Goals	Apps	Goals
1	GK	(Singapore) SGP	Ahmadulhaq Che Omar	24	0	22+1	0	1+0	0	0+0	0
18	GK	(Singapore) SGP	Ang Bang Heng	4	0	1+0	0	0+0	0	3+0	0
30	GK	(Singapore) SGP	Fearghus Bruce***	1	0	1+0	0	0+0	0	0+0	0
2	DF	(Singapore) SGP	Danny Chew Ji Xiang	14	0	9+1	0	1+0	0	3+0	0
3	DF	(Singapore) SGP	Duncan David Elias	24	0	19+1	0	1+0	0	3+0	0
4	DF	(Trinidad and Tobago) TTO	Fabien Lewis	21	0	19+1	0	1+0	0	0+0	0
5	DF	(England) ENG	Daniel Hammond	27	2	23+0	1	1+0	0	3+0	1
12	DF	(Singapore) SGP	K. Sathiaraj	16	0	11+4	0	0+1	0	0+0	0
16	DF	(Singapore) SGP	Edward Tan**	7	0	5+1	0	0+1	0	0+0	0
19	DF	(Singapore) SGP	Vincent Lee**	4	0	3+1	0	0+0	0	0+0	0
22	DF	(Singapore) SGP	Farhan Hairoddin***	1	0	0+1	0	0+0	0	0+0	0
23	DF	(Singapore) SGP	Dinie Fitri***	1	0	1+0	0	0+0	0	0+0	0
40	DF	(Singapore) SGP	Zulkarnain Malik***	7	0	2+2	0	0+0	0	3+0	0
6	MF	(Singapore) SGP	Armanizam Dolah	22	0	19+1	0	0+0	0	1+1	0
7	MF	(Singapore) SGP	Guntur Djafril	21	1	17+2	1	0+0	0	1+1	0
8	MF	(Singapore) SGP	Han Yiguang	16	0	11+2	0	0+1	0	2+0	0
11	MF	(Singapore) SGP	Shamsurin Abdul Rahman	23	0	14+8	0	1+0	0	0+0	0
13	MF	(Singapore) SGP	Aloysius Yap**	13	1	3+7	0	1+0	0	1+1	1
19	MF	(Singapore) SGP	Oswind Suriya Rosayro***	17	1	5+9	1	0+0	0	0+3	0
20	MF	(Australia) AUS	Hussein Akil	23	3	18+1	3	1+0	0	3+0	0
27	MF	(Singapore) SGP	Andy Ahmad***	8	0	0+8	0	0+0	0	0+0	0
32	MF	(Singapore) SGP	Omar Ismail***	1	0	0+0	0	0+0	0	0+1	0
9	FW	(Singapore) SGP	Goh Swee Swee	27	4	21+3	4	1+0	0	2+0	0
10	FW	(South Korea) KOR	Moon Soon-Ho	28	10	23+1	9	1+0	1	3+0	0
17	FW	(Singapore) SGP	Farizal Basri	24	0	14+6	0	1+0	0	2+1	0
34	FW	(Singapore) SGP	Navin Neil Vanu	7	0	3+1	0	0+0	0	3+0	0

Last updated: 4 November 2012
Source: Match reports in Competitive matches

** Vincent Lee, Edward Tan and Aloysius Yap retired from professional football during the mid-season window.
*** Denotes Prime League players

=== First Team Goalscoring Statistics ===
Includes all competitive matches. The list is sorted by shirt number when total goals are equal.

Ran	No.	Pos	Nat	Name	S-League	RHB Singapore Cup	Starhub League Cup	Total
1	10	FW	(South Korea)	Moon Soon-Ho	9	1	0	10
2	9	FW	(Singapore)	Goh Swee Swee	4	0	0	4
3	20	MF	(Australia)	Hussein Akil	3	0	0	3
4	5	DF	(England)	Daniel Hammond	1	0	1	2
5	7	MF	(Singapore)	Guntur Djafril	1	0	0	1
5	13	MF	(Singapore)	Aloysius Yap	0	0	1	1
5	19	MF	(Singapore)	Oswind Suriya	1	0	0	1
				TOTALS	19	1	2	22

Last updated: 4 November 2012
Source: Match reports in Competitive matches

4 of Moon Soon-Ho's goals (3 in the S.League and 1 in the Singapore Cup) were scored via penalty kicks.

=== First Team Goal Assist Statistics ===
Includes all competitive matches. The list is sorted by shirt number when total assists are equal.

Ran	No.	Pos	Nat	Name	S-League	RHB Singapore Cup	Starhub League Cup	Total
1	10	FW	(South Korea)	Moon Soon-Ho	6	0	1	7
2	9	FW	(Singapore)	Goh Swee Swee	3	0	0	3
3	5	DF	(England)	Daniel Hammond	2	0	0	2
3	6	MF	(Singapore)	Armanizam Dolah	2	0	0	2
4	3	DF	(Singapore)	Duncan Elias	0	0	1	1
				TOTALS	13	0	2	15

Last updated: 25 October 2012
Source: Match reports in Competitive matches

A total of 5 goals scored (4 in the S.League and 1 in the Singapore Cup) were not recorded with assists as they were scored either via penalty kicks or indirect free kicks.

=== First Team Clean sheets ===
Includes all competitive matches. The list is sorted by shirt number when total clean sheets are equal.

R	No.	Pos	Nat	Name	S-League	RHB Singapore Cup	Starhub League Cup	Total
1	1	GK	(Singapore)	Ahmadulhaq Che Omar	3	0	0	3
				TOTALS	3	0	0	3

Last updated: 4 November 2012
Source: Match reports in Competitive matches

=== First Team Disciplinary record ===
Includes all competitive matches. The list is sorted by shirt number when total cards are equal.

R	No.	Pos	Nat	Name	S-League			RHB Singapore Cup			Starhub League Cup			Total		
R	No.	Pos	Nat	Name	Yellow card	(yellow card) (yellow-red card)	Red card	Yellow card	(yellow card) (yellow-red card)	Red card	Yellow card	(yellow card) (yellow-red card)	Red card	Yellow card	(yellow card) (yellow-red card)	Red card
1	8	MF	(Singapore)	Han Yiguang	7	1	0	0	0	0	1	1	0	8	2	0
2	9	FW	(Singapore)	Goh Swee Swee	5	1	0	0	0	0	1	0	0	6	1	0
3	40	DF	(Singapore)	Zulkarnain Malik	1	1	0	0	0	0	0	0	0	1	1	0
4	18	GK	(Singapore)	Ang Bang Heng	0	0	1	0	0	0	0	0	0	0	0	1
5	17	FW	(Singapore)	Farizal Basri	5	0	0	0	0	0	1	0	0	6	0	0
6	3	DF	(Singapore)	Duncan Elias	5	0	0	0	0	0	0	0	0	5	0	0
6	12	DF	(Singapore)	K. Sathiaraj	5	0	0	0	0	0	0	0	0	5	0	0
7	6	MF	(Singapore)	Armanizam Dolah	4	0	0	0	0	0	0	0	0	4	0	0
8	2	DF	(Singapore)	Danny Chew	2	0	0	1	0	0	0	0	0	3	0	0
8	4	DF	(Trinidad and Tobago)	Fabien Lewis	3	0	0	0	0	0	0	0	0	3	0	0
8	5	DF	(Singapore)	Daniel Hammond	3	0	0	0	0	0	0	0	0	3	0	0
9	7	MF	(Singapore)	Guntur Djafril	2	0	0	0	0	0	0	0	0	2	0	0
9	20	MF	(Lebanon)	Hussein Akil	2	0	0	0	0	0	0	0	0	2	0	0
10	1	GK	(Singapore)	Ahmadulhaq Che Omar	1	0	0	0	0	0	0	0	0	1	0	0
10	10	FW	(South Korea)	Moon Soon-Ho	1	0	0	0	0	0	0	0	0	1	0	0
10	13	MF	(Singapore)	Aloysius Yap**	1	0	0	0	0	0	0	0	0	1	0	0
10	16	DF	(Singapore)	Edward Tan**	1	0	0	0	0	0	0	0	0	1	0	0
10	19	DF	(Singapore)	Vincent Lee**	1	0	0	0	0	0	0	0	0	1	0	0
10	34	FW	(Singapore)	Navin Neil Vanu	1	0	0	0	0	0	0	0	0	1	0	0
				TOTALS	50	3	1	1	0	0	3	1	0	54	4	1

Last updated: 25 October 2012
Source: Match reports in Competitive matches

** Vincent Lee, Edward Tan and Aloysius Yap retired from professional football during the mid-season window.

== Prime League ==
=== Prime League Squad ===
Note: Flags indicate national team as defined under FIFA eligibility rules; some limited exceptions apply. Players may hold more than one non-FIFA nationality.

No.	Pos.	Nation	Player
19	MF	SGP	Oswind Suriya Rosayro
22	MF	SGP	Farhan Hairoddin
23	DF	SGP	Dinie Fitri
24	FW	SGP	Ali Razali
25	DF	SGP	Nurhakim Kamsani
26	DF	SGP	Mohd Haziq Durrani
27	MF	SGP	Andy Ahmad
28	DF	SGP	Sidiq Abdullah
30	GK	SGP	Fearghus Lyle Bruce

No.	Pos.	Nation	Player
31	FW	SGP	Roihan Rashid
32	MF	SGP	Omar Ismail
33	MF	SGP	Imran Osman
35	MF	SGP	Zuraizi Saifollah
36	DF	SGP	Mark Tan
37	FW	SGP	Danial Tan Farhan
39	GK	SGP	Abdul Qadir Yusoff
40	DF	SGP	Zulkarnain Malik

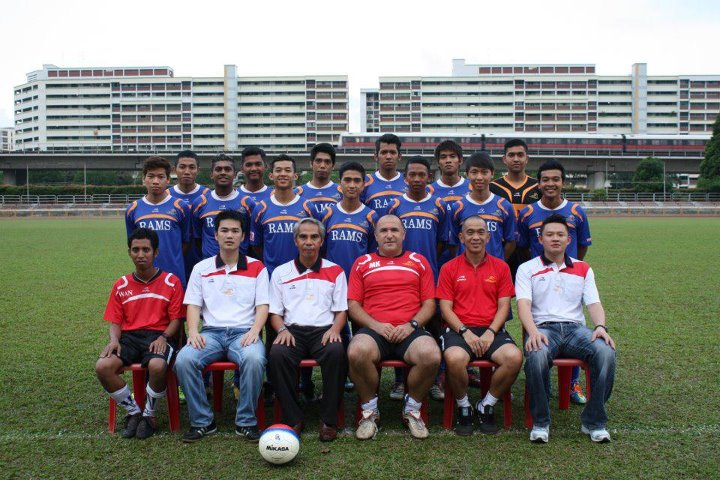
Woodlands Wellington 2012 Prime League Squad, pictured here in their blue away strip.

=== Prime League Table ===
Pos	Team	Pld	W	D	L	GF	GA	GD	Pts
1	Balestier Khalsa (C)	30	19	7	4	68	34	+34	64
2	Singapore NFA U-18	30	17	6	7	55	30	+25	57
3	Geylang International	30	16	9	5	57	37	+20	57
4	Home United	30	14	8	8	70	52	+18	50
5	Gombak United	30	15	5	10	55	50	+5	50
6	Singapore Armed Forces	30	12	7	11	64	55	+9	43
7	Woodlands Wellington	30	11	3	16	37	48	−11	36
8	Tanjong Pagar United	30	9	7	14	32	43	−11	34
9	Tampines Rovers	30	6	9	15	31	53	−22	27
10	NFA Singapore U-17	30	5	7	18	43	75	−32	22
11	Hougang United	30	5	4	21	28	70	−42	19

Updated to match(es) played on 25 October 2012. Source: Standings
Rules for classification: 1) points; 2) goal difference; 3) number of goals scored.
(C) Champions

=== Prime League results by round ===
Round	1	2	3	4	5	6	7	8	9	10	11	12	13	14	15	16	17	18	19	20	21	22	23	24	25	26	27	28	29	30
Ground	A	A	A	H	A	H	A	H	A	H	H	H	H	A	H	A	H	A	A	H	A	A	H	A	A	H	A	H	A	H
Result	L	W	L	W	W	D	W	L	L	W	W	D	L	W	L	W	W	L	L	W	L	L	L	L	L	D	L	W	L	L

Updated to match(es) played on 25 October 2012. Source: Matches and sleague.com
A = Away; H = Home; W = Win; D = Draw; L = Loss

=== Prime League Matches ===
25 February 2012 1	Hougang United	2–1	Woodlands Wellington	Hougang Stadium
17:00 GMT+8	Muhammad Farhan Bin Rahmat 7'; Megat Hikal Bin Salim 23'; Manoj Kumar (yellow card) 46'; Fazly Hasan (yellow card) 55'	Details	(yellow card) 10' Ali Razali; 51' Danial Tan Farhan	Referee: Ahmad A'Qashah

3 March 2012 2	Tampines Rovers	0–1	Woodlands Wellington	Clementi Stadium
17:00 GMT+8		Details	3' Zuraizi Saifollah; (yellow card) 65' Zulkarnain Malik; (yellow card) 93' Abdul Qadir Yusoff	Referee: Ong Sung Teck

11 March 2012 3	Singapore NFA U-18	5–0	Woodlands Wellington	Bukit Gombak Stadium
17:00 GMT+8	Syafiq Iderus 19'; Syahiran Miswan 31'; Nur Ridho 34'; Asshidiq Wahid 59'; Shannon Stephen (yellow card) 77'; Ahmad Khidhir 90'	Details	(yellow card) 30' Farhan Hairoddin; (yellow card) 75' Andy Ahmad; (yellow card) 77' Dinie Fitri	Referee: Muhd Syarqawi

19 March 2012 4	Woodlands Wellington	3–0	Geylang United	Woodlands Stadium
19:00 GMT+8	Ali Razali 2'; Dinie Fitri (yellow card) 41'; Roihan Rashid 49'; Ang Bang Heng (yellow card) 63'; Andy Ahmad 70'; Danny Chew (yellow card) 76'; Imran Osman (yellow card) 88'	Details	(yellow card) 68' Khairulnizam Jumahat; (yellow card) 71' Nurhazwan Norasikin	Referee: Jansen Foo

26 March 2012 5	Home United	0–2	Woodlands Wellington	Bishan Stadium
19:00 GMT+8	Hanafi Ghazali (yellow card) 24'; Hafiz Nor (yellow card) 43'; Izzat Ishamuddin (yellow card) 80'; Izzat Ishamuddin (yellow card) 80' (red card)	Details	5' Andy Ahmad; (yellow card) 46' Aloysius Yap; 89' Omar Ismail; (yellow card) 91' Omar Ismail	Referee: W Ravisanthiran

7 April 2012 6	Woodlands Wellington	0–0	NFA Singapore U-17	Woodlands Stadium
17:00 GMT+8	Omar Ismail (yellow card) 30'; Dinie Fitri (yellow card) 36'; Farhan Hairoddin (yellow card) 62'	Details	(yellow card) 36' Jonathan Tan	Referee: Abirami Naidu

16 April 2012 7	Tanjong Pagar United	0–1	Woodlands Wellington	Queenstown Stadium
19:00 GMT+8	S Vikneshwaran (yellow card) 70'	Details	(yellow card) 27' Farhan Hairoddin; (yellow card) 61' Ali Razali; 66' Andy Ahmad; (yellow card) 80' Andy Ahmad	Referee: Muhd Farhan

23 April 2012 8	Woodlands Wellington	0–2	SAFFC	Woodlands Stadium
19:00 GMT+8	Farhan Hairoddin (yellow card) 55'; Sidiq Abdullah (yellow card) 62'; Farhan Hairoddin (yellow card) 73' (red card); Ali Razali (yellow card) 73'; Oswind Suriya (yellow card) 80'	Details	22' Daud Abdul Aziz; (yellow card) 38' Junaidy Salleh; (yellow card) 60' Nooruddeen Tajuddeen; (yellow card) 73' Nicholas Cher; 80' Hafsyar Farkhan	Referee: Nathan Chan

29 April 2012 9	Balestier Khalsa	3–1	Woodlands Wellington	Toa Payoh Stadium
17:00 GMT+8	Nur Asyidiq 10'; Kim Minho 17'; Nur Asyidiq (yellow card) 32'; Muhaymin Salim (yellow card) 87'; Kim Minho 54'	Details	28' Goh Swee Swee; (yellow card) 32' Ali Razali; (yellow card) 43' Omar Ismail; (yellow card) 56' Goh Swee Swee; (yellow card) 91' Aloysius Yap	Referee: Muhd Farhad

6 May 2012 10	Woodlands Wellington	4–0	Gombak United	Woodlands Stadium
17:00 GMT+8	Oswind Suriya 1'; Danial Tan Farhan 44'; Aloysius Yap (yellow card) 77'; Oswind Suriya 79'; Aloysius Yap 85'	Details	(yellow card) 92' Firman Hanif	Referee: Muhd Syarqawi

12 May 2012 11	Woodlands Wellington	2–1	Hougang United	Woodlands Stadium
17:00 GMT+8	Zulkarnain Malik 47'; Danial Tan Farhan 81'	Details	(yellow card) 40' Fazly Hasan; (yellow card) 40' Farhan Rahmat; (yellow card) 41' Manoj Kumar; 86' Nurhilmi Jasni	Referee: Ong Chai Lee

19 May 2012 12	Woodlands Wellington	2–2	Tampines Rovers	Woodlands Stadium
17:00 GMT+8	Roihan Rashid 38'; Dinie Fitri (yellow card) 43'; Ali Razali (yellow card) 63'; Oswind Suriya 91'	Details	4' Haziq Azman; 21' Syafiq Siraj; (yellow card) 46' Aslam Ismail Yaakop; (yellow card) 74' Ng Wei Kang; (yellow card) 90' Hairulnazri Hanafi	Referee: Jansen Foo

26 May 2012 13	Woodlands Wellington	1–3	Singapore NFA U-18	Woodlands Stadium
17:00 GMT+8	Sidiq Abdullah 26'	Details	31' Syahiran Miswan; 47' Zulkarnain Malik (og); 80' Syahiran Miswan	Referee: Abirami Naidu

2 June 2012 14	Geylang United	1–2	Woodlands Wellington	Bedok Stadium
17:00 GMT+8	Danial Razali 50'; Danial Razali (yellow card) 70'	Details	(yellow card) 70' Dinie Fitri; 74' Omar Ismail; 81' Basil Teo (og)	Referee: K Kalimuthu

9 June 2012 15	Woodlands Wellington	0–1	Home United	Woodlands Stadium
17:00 GMT+8	Sidiq Abdullah (yellow card) 50'	Details	57' Saiful Jamaludin	Referee: Abdul Malik

23 June 2012 16	NFA Singapore U-17	0–3	Woodlands Wellington	Yishun Stadium
17:00 GMT+8	Jeffrey Lightfoot (yellow card) 47'; Muhaimin Suhaimi (yellow card) 90'	Details	(yellow card) 11' Fearghus Lyle Bruce; 16' Ali Razali; 17' Danial Tan Farhan; 93' Guntur Djafril	Referee: K Kalimuthu

30 June 2012 17	Woodlands Wellington	2–0	Tanjong Pagar United	Woodlands Stadium
17:00 GMT+8	Mark Tan (yellow card) 27'; Fearghus Lyle Bruce (yellow card) 54'; Omar Ismail 61'; Omar Ismail 73'; Zulkarnain Malik (yellow card) 76'; Sidiq Abdullah (yellow card) 79'; Farhan Hairoddin (yellow card) 88'; Han Yiguang (yellow card) 91'	Details	(yellow card) 30' S Vikneshwaran	Referee: Ong Chai Lee

10 July 2012 18	SAFFC	4–1	Woodlands Wellington	Choa Chu Kang Stadium
19:00 GMT+8	Junaidy Salleh 28'; Marin Jonjic 29'; Marin Jonjic (yellow card) 38'; Hakim Jumahat 45'; Marin Jonjic 46'; T Mohaanaraj (yellow card) 38'	Details	(yellow card) 22' Danial Tan Farhan; 28' Roihan Rashid; (yellow card) 57' Ali Razali; (yellow card) 61' Dinie Fitri	Referee: Er Swee Ann

21 July 2012 19	Woodlands Wellington	0–4	Balestier Khalsa	Woodlands Stadium
20:30 GMT+8	Ang Bang Heng (yellow card) 28'; Ali Razali (yellow card) 31'; Mark Tan (yellow card) 39'; Omar Ismail (yellow card) 55'	Details	28' Kim Minho (pk); (yellow card) 31' Ho Wai Loon; (yellow card) 32' Kim Minho; 59' Ho Wai Loon; 66' Ho Wai Loon; 90' Muhaymin Salim	Referee: Abirami Naidu

12 August 2012 20	Woodlands Wellington	3–0	Tampines Rovers	Woodlands Stadium
20:30 GMT+8	Sidiq Abdullah (yellow card) 25'; Danial Tan Farhan 30'; Danny Chew 31'; Roihan Rashid 85'	Details	(yellow card) 50' Fariq Ghani	Referee: Syed Ibrahim

17 August 2012* 21	Singapore NFA U-18	3–0	Woodlands Wellington	Bukit Gombak Stadium
17:00 GMT+8	Shannon Stephen 42'; Nur Ridho 58'; Shannon Stephen 79'; Fawwaz Anuar (yellow card) 89'	Details	(yellow card) 39' Farhan Hairoddin; (yellow card) 80' (red card) Farhan Hairoddin; (yellow card) 87' Danial Tan Farhan; (red card) 89' Danial Tan Farhan	Referee: Andrew Kee

22 August 2012* 22	Gombak United	5–1	Woodlands Wellington	Jurong West Stadium
20:30 GMT+8	Mustaqim Manzur 52' (pk) Mustaqim Manzur 55'; Julian Aguirre 56'; Ahmad Suhaimi 63'; Asyik Abdullah 75'	Details	43' Dinie Fitri; (yellow card) 59' Roihan Rashid	Referee: Er Swee Ann

27 August 2012 23	Woodlands Wellington	0–2	Geylang United	Woodlands Stadium
17:00 GMT+8	Farhan Hairoddin (yellow card) 18'; Roihan Rashid (yellow card) 60'; K Sathiaraj (yellow card) 65'; Han Yiguang (yellow card) 78'	Details	29' Taufiq Ghani; (yellow card) 62' Taufiq Ghani; 67' Rizawan Abdullah; (yellow card) 76' Basil Teo	Referee: Jansen Foo

5 September 2012* 24	Hougang United	1–0	Woodlands Wellington	Hougang Stadium
19:00 GMT+8	Khairulnizam Zakaria 37'; Ignatius Ang (yellow card) 81'	Details	(yellow card) 32' K Sathiaraj	Referee: Jansen Foo

16 September 2012* 25	Home United	1–0	Woodlands Wellington	Bishan Stadium
17:00 GMT+8	Rafiq Jamal 30'; Safwan Ramlan (yellow card) 80'	Details	(yellow card) 86' Nurhakim Kamsani; (yellow card) 90' Farizal Basri	Referee: W Ravisanthiran

23 September 2012 26	Woodlands Wellington	2–2	NFA Singapore U-17	Woodlands Stadium
17:00 GMT+8	Duncan Elias (yellow card) 28'; Zuraizi Saifollah 45'; Sidiq Abdullah (yellow card) 53'; Mark Tan (yellow card) 53'	Details	22' Hanafi Akbar; (yellow card) 37' Firdaus Sham; (yellow card) 49' Jeffrey Lightfoot; 75' Faiq Ismail	Referee: Ong Chai Lee

1 October 2012 27	Tanjong Pagar United	1–0	Woodlands Wellington	Queenstown Stadium
17:00 GMT+8	Yeo Chao Hong 66'; Ravindira Ghopinath (yellow card) 78'	Details	(yellow card) 49' Haziq Durrani; (yellow card) 61' Zuraizi Saifollah; (yellow card) 92' Dinie Fitri	Referee: Irwan Samsuddin

6 October 2012 28	Woodlands Wellington	5–1	SAFFC	Woodlands Stadium
17:00 GMT+8	Omar Ismail 38'; Andy Ahmad 73'; Danial Tan Farhan 83'; Haziq Durrani 91'; Farhan Hairoddin 93'	Details	(yellow card) 39' Noorullah Jahangir; (yellow card) 46' Matthew Abraham; 70' Matthew Abraham (pk)	Referee: Muhd Farhad

14 October 2012 29	Balestier Khalsa	1–0	Woodlands Wellington	Toa Payoh Stadium
17:00 GMT+8	Basit Mansoor 38'	Details	(yellow card) 17' Mark Tan; (yellow card) 35' Farhan Hairoddin; (yellow card) 40' Andy Ahmad	Referee: Daniel Wong

22 October 2012 30	Woodlands Wellington	0–3	Gombak United	Woodlands Stadium
17:00 GMT+8	Farhan Hairoddin (yellow card) 86'	Details	11' Fuad Jufri; 57' Asyik Abdullah; (yellow card) 71' Shazwan Sidek; 85' Shazwan Sidek	Referee: Jansen Foo

* Match rescheduled due to the Singapore League Cup.

=== Singapore Pools FA Cup ===
4 July 2012 Third Round*	Balestier Khalsa	2–0	Woodlands Wellington	Toa Payoh Stadium
19:00 GMT+8	Ho Wai Loon 24'; Rahim As'ari 25'

* Both Prime League teams received automatic byes into the FA Cup third round.

=== Prime League appearances and goals ===
No.	Pos	Nat	Player	Total		Prime League		FA Cup	
No.	Pos	Nat	Player	Apps	Goals	Apps	Goals	Apps	Goals
18	GK	(Singapore) SGP	Ang Bang Heng	7	0	7+0	0	0+0	0
30	GK	(Singapore) SGP	Fearghus Lyle Bruce	13	0	10+3	0	0+0	0
39	GK	(Singapore) SGP	Abdul Qadir Yusoff	17	0	13+4	0	0+0	0
2	DF	(Singapore) SGP	Danny Chew	6	1	6+0	1	0+0	0
3	DF	(Singapore) SGP	Duncan Elias	1	0	1+0	0	0+0	0
12	DF	(Singapore) SGP	K. Sathiaraj	2	0	2+0	0	0+0	0
16	DF	(Singapore) SGP	Edward Tan	1	0	1+0	0	0+0	0
19	DF	(Singapore) SGP	Vincent Lee**	3	0	3+0	0	0+0	0
23	DF	(Singapore) SGP	Dinie Fitri (Vice-Captain)	28	1	28+0	1	0+0	0
23	DF	(Singapore) SGP	Nurhakim Kamsani	22	0	5+17	0	0+0	0
26	DF	(Singapore) SGP	Mohd Haziq Durrani	25	1	20+5	1	0+0	0
28	DF	(Singapore) SGP	Sidiq Abdullah	29	1	29+0	1	0+0	0
36	DF	(Singapore) SGP	Mark Tan	23	0	17+6	0	0+0	0
40	DF	(Singapore) SGP	Zulkarnain Malik	29	1	29+0	1	0+0	0
7	MF	(Singapore) SGP	Guntur Djafril	3	1	3+0	1	0+0	0
8	MF	(Singapore) SGP	Han Yiguang	4	0	4+0	0	0+0	0
11	MF	(Singapore) SGP	Shamsurin Abdul Rahman	1	0	0+1	0	0+0	0
13	MF	(Singapore) SGP	Aloysius Yap	3	1	3+0	1	0+0	0
17	MF	(Singapore) SGP	Farizal Basri	3	0	2+1	0	0+0	0
19	MF	(Singapore) SGP	Oswind Suriya	13	3	11+2	3	0+0	0
22	MF	(Singapore) SGP	Farhan Hairoddin (Captain)	26	1	25+1	1	0+0	0
24	FW	(Singapore) SGP	Ali Razali	17	2	17+0	2	0+0	0
27	MF	(Singapore) SGP	Andy Ahmad	13	4	10+3	4	0+0	0
32	MF	(Singapore) SGP	Omar Ismail	25	5	19+6	5	0+0	0
33	MF	(Singapore) SGP	Imran Osman	16	1	10+6	1	0+0	0
35	MF	(Singapore) SGP	Zuraizi Saifollah	16	2	6+10	2	0+0	0
9	FW	(Singapore) SGP	Goh Swee Swee	1	1	1+0	1	0+0	0
31	MF	(Singapore) SGP	Roihan Rashid	29	4	23+6	4	0+0	0
34	FW	(Singapore) SGP	Navin Neil Vanu	1	0	1+0	0	0+0	0
37	FW	(Singapore) SGP	Danial Tan Farhan	25	6	22+3	6	0+0	0

Last updated: 25 October 2012
Source: Match reports in Competitive matches

* Vincent Lee and Edward Tan retired from football during the mid-season transfer window.

=== Prime League Goalscoring Statistics ===
Includes all competitive matches. The list is sorted by shirt number when total goals are equal.

Ran	No.	Pos	Nat	Name	Prime League	FA Cup	Total
1	37	FW	(Singapore)	Danial Tan Farhan	6	0	6
2	32	MF	(Singapore)	Omar Ismail	5	0	5
3	27	MF	(Singapore)	Andy Ahmad	4	0	4
3	31	MF	(Singapore)	Roihan Rashid	4	0	4
5	19	MF	(Singapore)	Oswind Suriya	3	0	3
6	24	FW	(Singapore)	Ali Razali	2	0	2
6	35	MF	(Singapore)	Zuraizi Saifollah	2	0	2
7	2	DF	(Singapore)	Danny Chew	1	0	1
7	9	FW	(Singapore)	Goh Swee Swee	1	0	1
7	7	MF	(Singapore)	Guntur Djafril	1	0	1
7	13	MF	(Singapore)	Aloysius Yap	1	0	1
7	22	MF	(Singapore)	Farhan Hairoddin	1	0	1
7	23	DF	(Singapore)	Dinie Fitri	1	0	1
7	26	DF	(Singapore)	Mohd Haziq Durrani	1	0	1
7	28	DF	(Singapore)	Sidiq Abdullah	1	0	1
7	33	MF	(Singapore)	Imran Osman	1	0	1
7	40	DF	(Singapore)	Zulkarnain Malik	1	0	1
				TOTALS	36	0	36

Last updated: 25 October 2012
Source: Match reports in Competitive matches

- One of Woodlands Wellington's goals was scored via an own goal by Basil Teo during the match against Geylang United on 2 June 2012.

=== Prime League Clean sheets ===
Includes all competitive matches. The list is sorted by shirt number when total clean sheets are equal.

R	No.	Pos	Nat	Name	Prime League	FA Cup	Total
1	30	GK	(Singapore)	Fearghus Lyle Bruce	4	0	4
1	39	GK	(Singapore)	Abdul Qadir Yusoff	4	0	4
2	18	GK	(Singapore)	Ang Bang Heng	3	0	3
				TOTALS	11	0	11

Last updated: 27 August 2012
Source: Match reports in Competitive matches

=== Prime League Disciplinary record ===
Includes all competitive matches. The list is sorted by shirt number when total cards are equal.

R	No.	Pos	Nat	Name	Prime League			FA Cup			Total		
R	No.	Pos	Nat	Name	Yellow card	(yellow card) (yellow-red card)	Red card	Yellow card	(yellow card) (yellow-red card)	Red card	Yellow card	(yellow card) (yellow-red card)	Red card
1	22	MF	(Singapore)	Farhan Hairoddin	9	2	0	0	0	0	9	2	0
2	37	FW	(Singapore)	Danial Tan Farhan	2	0	1	0	0	0	2	0	1
3	23	DF	(Singapore)	Dinie Fitri	7	0	0	0	0	0	7	0	0
3	24	MF	(Singapore)	Ali Razali	7	0	0	0	0	0	7	0	0
5	28	DF	(Singapore)	Sidiq Abdullah	5	0	0	0	0	0	5	0	0
6	35	MF	(Singapore)	Omar Ismail	4	0	0	0	0	0	4	0	0
6	36	DF	(Singapore)	Mark Tan	4	0	0	0	0	0	4	0	0
7	27	MF	(Singapore)	Andy Ahmad	3	0	0	0	0	0	3	0	0
8	8	MF	(Singapore)	Han Yiguang	2	0	0	0	0	0	2	0	0
8	12	DF	(Singapore)	K. Sathiaraj	2	0	0	0	0	0	2	0	0
8	13	MF	(Singapore)	Aloysius Yap	2	0	0	0	0	0	2	0	0
8	18	GK	(Singapore)	Ang Bang Heng	2	0	0	0	0	0	2	0	0
8	30	GK	(Singapore)	Fearghus Lyle Bruce	2	0	0	0	0	0	2	0	0
8	31	FW	(Singapore)	Roihan Rashid	2	0	0	0	0	0	2	0	0
8	40	DF	(Singapore)	Zulkarnain Malik	2	0	0	0	0	0	2	0	0
9	2	DF	(Singapore)	Danny Chew	1	0	0	0	0	0	1	0	0
9	3	DF	(Singapore)	Duncan Elias	1	0	0	0	0	0	1	0	0
9	9	FW	(Singapore)	Goh Swee Swee	1	0	0	0	0	0	1	0	0
9	17	MF	(Singapore)	Farizal Basri	1	0	0	0	0	0	1	0	0
9	19	MF	(Singapore)	Oswind Suriya	1	0	0	0	0	0	1	0	0
9	25	DF	(Singapore)	Nurhakim Kamsani	1	0	0	0	0	0	1	0	0
9	26	DF	(Singapore)	Haziq Durrani	1	0	0	0	0	0	1	0	0
9	33	MF	(Singapore)	Imran Osman	1	0	0	0	0	0	1	0	0
9	35	MF	(Singapore)	Zuraizi Saifollah	1	0	0	0	0	0	1	0	0
9	39	GK	(Singapore)	Abdul Qadir Yusoff	1	0	0	0	0	0	1	0	0
				TOTALS	65	2	1	0	0	0	65	2	1

Last updated: 25 October 2012
Source: Match reports in Competitive matches
