= List of S.League transfers 2011 =

The following is a list of transfers for the 2011 S.League.

== Albirex Niigata (S) ==
In

- (Japan) Shuhei Hotta from Consadole Sapporo
- (Japan) Shotaro Ihata from Roasso Kumamoto
- (Japan) Yōsuke Saito from Yokohama F. Marinos
- (Japan) Musashi Okuyama from Albirex Niigata
- (Japan) Norihiro Kawakami from Zweigen Kanazawa
- Shimpei Sakurada from Japan Soccer College
- (Japan) Kunihiro Yamashita from Roasso Kumamoto

Out

- (Japan) Ken Matsumoto to Sisaket FC
- (Japan) Mitsuki Ichihara to United Sikkim FC

== Balestier Khalsa FC ==
In

- (Singapore) Armanizam Dolah from Gombak United
- (Singapore) Anaz Hadee from Woodlands Wellington
- (South Korea) Lim Young Woo
- (South Korea) Kim Young Kwang from Suwon City FC

Out

- (England) Daniel Hammond to SAFFC
- (Brazil) Rivaldo Costa Amaral Filho *released
- (Singapore) Goh Swee Swee to Woodlands Wellington
- (Singapore) Han Yiguang to Woodlands Wellington
- (Singapore) Mohamed Sofiyan Bin Abdul Hamid to Geylang United

== Etoile FC ==
In

- (Mauritius) Jonathan Justin from Auch Gascogne

Out

- (France) Frédéric Mendy to Home United FC
- (France) Karim Boudjema to Othellos Athienou F.C.
- (France) Flavien Michelini to FC Gueugnon
- (France) Kevin Yann to PSMS Medan
- (France) Khaled Kharroubi to Osotspa Saraburi FC

== Geylang United FC ==
In

- (Singapore) Mohamed Sofiyan Bin Abdul Hamid from Balestier Khalsa
- (South Korea) Joo Ki Hwan

Out

- (Singapore) Itimi Dickson *released
- (Singapore) Siddiq Durimi to Home United
- (Singapore) Toh Guo An *released
- (Slovakia) Rastislav Beličák *released
- (Slovakia) Peter Tomko *released
- (Singapore) Walid Lounis to Gombak United

== Gombak United FC ==
In

- (Singapore) Walid Lounis from Geylang United
- (Singapore) Tengku Mushadad from Home United

Out

- (Singapore) Armanizam Dolah to Balestier Khalsa
- (Singapore) Fazrul Nawaz to SAFFC
- (Singapore) Bah Mamadou to SAFFC
- (Singapore) Fabian Tan *released

== Home United FC ==
In

- (France) Frédéric Mendy from Etoile FC
- (Japan) Kenji Arai from Hougang United FC
- (Singapore) Qiu Li from Tampines Rovers
- (Singapore) Siddiq Durimi from Geylang United
- (South Korea) Kim Dae Eui from Suwon Samsung Bluewings

Out

- (South Korea) Choi Chul-Woo *retired
- (South Korea) Jun Woo Keun *retired
- (South Korea) Chun Jae Woon *released
- (Singapore) Tengku Mushadad to Gombak United
- (Singapore) Ridhuan Fatah Hassan to Hougang United FC

== Hougang United FC ==
In

- (Brazil) Diego Gama
- (Argentina) Carlos Alberto
- (Singapore) Ridhuan Fatah Hassan from Home United
- (Singapore) Noor Ali from Woodlands Wellington
- (Japan) Fumiya Kobayashi from Albirex Niigata (S)

Out

- (Japan) Kenji Arai to Home United
- (Iran) Mojtaba Tehranizadeh *released
- (Singapore) Amos Boon to Woodlands Wellington

== Singapore Armed Forces FC ==
In

- (Singapore) Fazrul Nawaz from Gombak United
- (England) Daniel Hammond from Balestier Khalsa
- (Serbia) Luka Savic from Young Lions
- (Singapore) Bah Mamadou from Gombak United
- (Croatia) Mislav Karoglan from HNK Rijeka *on loan

Out

- (Singapore) John Wilkinson to Insee Police
- (Croatia) Ivan Lovrić *released
- (Uruguay) Federico Martinez *released
- (Singapore) Ahmad Latiff to Tampines Rovers
- (Singapore) Park Tae Won *released

== Tampines Rovers FC ==
In

- (Singapore) Ahmad Latiff from SAFFC

Out

- (Singapore) Zulkarnaen Zainal *retired
- (Singapore) Qiu Li to Home United

== Woodlands Wellington FC ==
In

- (Singapore) Goh Swee Swee from Balestier Khalsa
- (Singapore) Han Yiguang from Balestier Khalsa
- (Singapore) Amos Boon from Hougang United FC
- (Lebanon) Munier Raychouni
- (Canada) Adrian Butters from Toronto Lynx
- (Scotland) Graham Tatters from FC Tampa Bay
- (Brazil) Leonardo Alexio da Costa from FC Volyn Lutsk

Out

- (Singapore) Anaz Hadee to Balestier Khalsa
- (Singapore) Noor Ali to Hougang United FC
- (Japan) Kazuki Yoshino to Sisaket F.C.
- (Morocco) Abdelhadi Laakkad *released
- (Chile) Luis Eduardo Hicks *released
- (Morocco) Rachid Lajane *released

== Young Lions ==
In

Out

- (Serbia) Luka Savic to SAFFC
- (South Korea) Kim Seong Kyu *released
- (South Korea) Seo Su Jong *released
