= Zulkarnain Malik =

Singaporean footballer

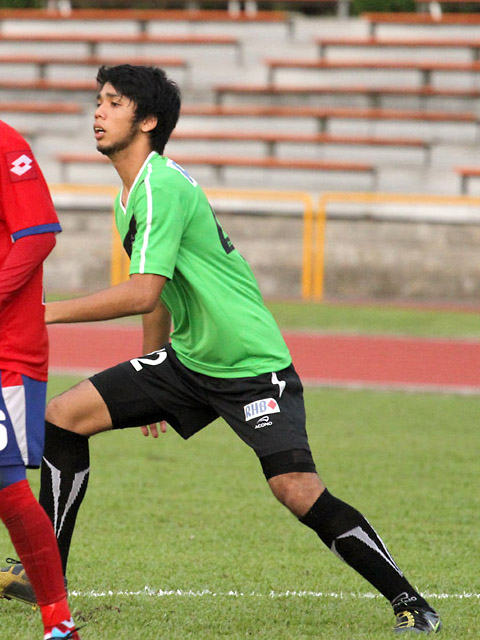
- Zulkarnain Malik in action for Woodlands Wellington in a friendly match against Johor FA in Woodlands Stadium on 22 May 2012

Personal information
- Full name: Zulkarnain bin Malik
- Date of birth: December 28, 1992 (age 33)
- Place of birth: Singapore
- Height: 1.76 m (5 ft 9 1/2 in)
- Position: Defender

Team information
- Current team: Woodlands Wellington FC
- Number: 40

Senior career*
Years	Team	Apps	(Gls)
2011 –	Woodlands Wellington FC	5	(0)
- * Club domestic league appearances and goals as of Nov 11, 2012

Zulkarnain Malik is a Singaporean footballer who plays for Woodlands Wellington FC, primarily in the Prime League as a defender.

== Club career ==
Zulkarnain made his senior debut for Woodlands Wellington on 4 October 2011 in the Rams 0–2 defeat to Etoile FC, playing in the first half before he was replaced by Oswind Suriya at half time.

As of 4 November 2012, Zulkarnain has made 5 senior appearances for Woodlands in the S.League, with 2 of those coming on as a substitute.

== Club career statistics ==
As of 4 November 2012

Club Performance		League		Cup		League Cup		Total				
Singapore		Prime League		FA Cup		--		Total				
Club	Season	Apps	Goals	Apps	Goals	Apps	Goals	Yellow card	(yellow card) (yellow-red card)	Red card	Apps	Goals
Woodlands Wellington	2012	29	1	0	0	-	-	2	0	0	29	1
Woodlands Wellington	2013	0	0	0	0	0	0	0	0	0	0	0
Club Performance		League		Cup		League Cup		Total				
Singapore		S.League		Singapore Cup		League Cup		Total				
Club	Season	Apps	Goals	Apps	Goals	Apps	Goals	Yellow card	(yellow card) (yellow-red card)	Red card	Apps	Goals
Woodlands Wellington	2011	1	0	0	0	0	0	0	0	0	1	0
Woodlands Wellington	2012	2 (2)	0	0	0	3	0	1	1	0	5 (2)	0
Woodlands Wellington	2013	0	0	0	0	0	0	0	0	0	0	0

All numbers encased in brackets signify substitute appearances.
