= Ahmadulhaq Che Omar =

Singaporean footballer

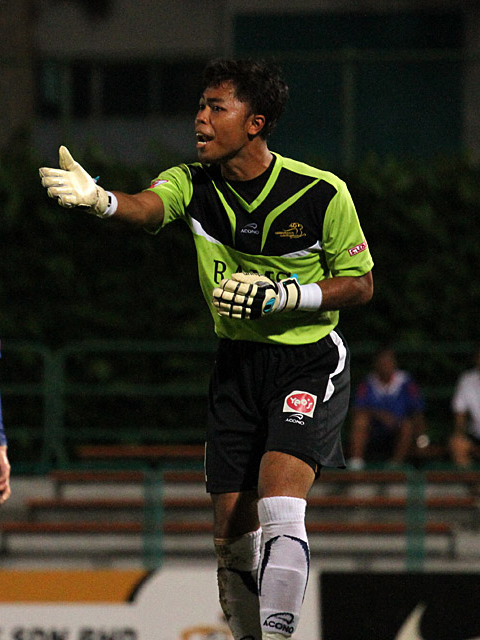
- Ahmadulhaq in action for Woodlands Wellington during an S.League match against Harimau Muda at Woodlands Stadium on 22 September 2012.

Personal information
- Full name: Ahmadulhaq Bin Che Omar
- Date of birth: 11 February 1981 (age 45)
- Place of birth: Singapore
- Height: 1.74 m (5 ft 8 1/2 in)
- Position: Goalkeeper

Team information
- Current team: Young Lions (goalkeeper coach)

Youth career
- 1999–2004: Woodlands Wellington

Senior career*
Years	Team	Apps	(Gls)
2005–2006	Woodlands Wellington	9	(0)
2007	Tampines Rovers		
2008–2009	Woodlands Wellington	10	(0)
2010–2011	Balestier Khalsa	27	(0)
2012–2014	Woodlands Wellington	28	(0)
2015–	Hougang United	0	(0)
2015–2016	Admiralty FC		

Managerial career
- 2017: National Football Academy (goalkeeper coach)
- 2022–: Young Lions (goalkeeper coach)
- * Club domestic league appearances and goals as of 11 April 2013

Ahmadulhaq Che Omar is a Singaporean goalkeeper who last played professionally for Hougang United. He is currently the goalkeeper coach of Singapore Premier League club Young Lions.

Until the merger of his former club Woodlands Wellington with Hougang United in 2015, he was the record holder for being the longest serving player for the Rams.

== Career ==
=== Starting in S.League ===
Ahmadulhaq started off his career as a youth player in Woodlands Wellington before moving up to feature in the senior team as the reserve goalkeeper in the 2005 S.League season behind Yazid Yasin. Unable to find a starting spot for himself due to Yazid's fine form, Ahmadulhaq moved to Tampines Rovers in 2007 behind Rezal Hassan.

He returned to Woodlands in the 2008 S.League season but once again had little game time as Woodlands employed the services of Yazid Yasin and veteran Rezal Hassan in 2009. Ahmadulhaq moved again in the pre-season of the 2010 S.League season, transferring over to Balestier Khalsa this time round.

In 2012, he was released by Balestier and he rejoined the Rams along with his coach, Salim Moin, and his teammates at Balestier, namely K. Sathiaraj, Shamsurin Abdul Rahman and Armanizam Dolah.

=== Big break with Woodlands Wellington ===
After spending 10 seasons with Woodlands, Ahmadulhaq finally got his big break in his 11th season with the Rams in 2012 when he was named as the first choice goalkeeper ahead of Woodlands' regular goalkeeper for the 2011 S.League season, Ang Bang Heng.

Ahmadulhaq was integral to Woodlands's first game of the 2012 campaign as his fine reflexes allowed the visitors to beat the Courts Young Lions on opening day. The Courts Young Lions were widely tipped to win the fixture but he was equal to the task of keeping everything out, frustrating them time and again.

He has also gone on to earn more plaudits as the 2012 S.League season progressed with his fine reflexes and shot stopping. Despite ending up on the losing team during the S.League match between Harimau Muda and Woodlands Wellington on 15 April 2012, Ahmadulhaq made the headlines when he made several fine saves and even stopped a penalty.

In a match against Balestier Khalsa on 20 July 2012, Ahmadulhaq made his second penalty save of the season against Paul Cunningham.

On 21 October 2012, Ahmadulhaq pulled off his third penalty save of the season against DPMM's Ivan Jerković.

=== Move to Hougang ===
After the announcement that Woodland will merge with Hougang United from 2015 season, Ahmadulhaq was one of the players from Woodlands to be transferred to Hougang, along with teammate Taufiq Ghani.

== Club career statistics ==
As of 11 April 2013

Club Performance		League		Cup		League Cup		Total				
Singapore		S.League		Singapore Cup		League Cup		Total				
Club	Season	Apps	Goals	Apps	Goals	Apps	Goals	Yellow card	(yellow card) (yellow-red card)	Red card	Apps	Goals
Woodlands Wellington	2009	9 (1)	0	0	0	0	0	0	0	0	9 (1)	0
Balestier Khalsa	2010	20	0	1	0	0	0	2	0	0	21	0
Balestier Khalsa	2011	6 (1)	0	0	0	0	0	0	0	0	6 (1)	0
Woodlands Wellington	2012	22 (1)	0	1	0	0	0	1	0	0	22 (1)	0
Woodlands Wellington	2013	4 (1)	0	0	0	0	0	0	0	0	4 (1)	0

All numbers encased in brackets signify substitute appearances.

== External golf links ==
- Ahmadulhaq Che Omar at Soccerway (archived)
