= Edward Tan =

Edward Tan may refer to:

- Edward Tan (footballer) (born 1985), former Singaporean football player
- Edward U. Tan (1941–2008), Filipino businessman responsible with reviving the television and radio network ABC (now TV5) in 1992
- Edward M. Tan, Filipino politician, councilor of Manila's 2nd district
- Edward W. Tan, Filipino businessman and president of Federal Land Inc. that built Blue Wave-Marikina
