= K. Sathiaraj =

Singaporean footballer

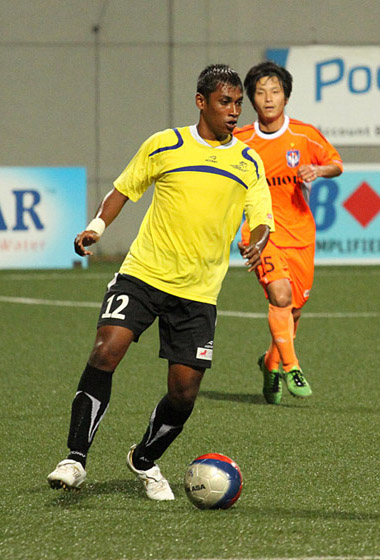
- K. Sathiaraj in action for Woodlands Wellington in a S.League match during the 2012 S.League season.

Personal information
- Full name: Sathiaraj s/o Krishna Murthy
- Date of birth: 15 October 1986 (age 40)
- Place of birth: Singapore
- Height: 1.73 m (5 ft 8 in)
- Position: Midfielder

Team information
- Current team: Gymkhana
- Number: 7

Senior career*
Years	Team	Apps	(Gls)
2007	Balestier Khalsa	20	(0)
2008	Young Lions	7	(0)
2009-2011	Balestier Khalsa	78	(0)
2012	Woodlands Wellington	15	(0)
2013	Admiralty	17	(0)
2014	Geylang International		(0)
2015	Yishun Sentek	15	(0)
2016	Balestier United RC	10	(0)
2018-2022	SKA	32	(2)
2022-current	Gymkhana FC	24	(2)
- * Club domestic league appearances and goals as of 30 November 2025

Krishna Murthy s/o Sathiaraj (born 15 October 1986) is a former Young Lions defender who last played for Geylang International FC in the S-League in Singapore.

He was from the COE youth Balestier Central FC at the year 2001 and 2002 under former national player Nasaruddin jalil. He played COE Balestier Khalsa Fc under18 at the year 2003 under Coach Zai. K. Sathiaraj got spotted by the previous (Singapore) under18 coach Mike Wong against Geylang United U18 and got called up for NFA (Singapore) U18 squad the year 2004. He joined Balestier Khalsa Prime League team year 2005 and 2006.

At the Year 2006 K. Sathiaraj make his first appearance for Balestier Khalsa in a S.League game against Alberix. He was sub in the match at 75 mins by coach Karim. He played few S.league matches the same year.

K.Sathiaraj was offered his Professional contract by Balestier Khalsa Fc the Year 2007. He started his professional career with Coach Nasaruddin jalil.

He joined Woodlands Wellington in the 2011 S-League off-season together with his coach and mentor at Balestier Khalsa, Salim Moin, as well as his Tigers teammates Ahmadulhaq Che Omar, Armanizam Dolah and Shamsurin Abdul Rahman.

With Woodlands vice-captain Duncan David Elias slotting in at left back, Sathiaraj usually plays at right back although he is equally adept at playing on either side of the pitch.

On 23 November 2012, it was announced by Woodlands Wellington that he would not be retained for the 2013 season.

== Club career statistics ==
As of 4 November 2012

Club	Season	League	League		Cup		League Cup		Total	
Club	Season	League	Apps	Goals	Apps	Goals	Apps	Goals	Apps	Goals
Balestier Khalsa	2009	S.League	13 (6)	0	0	0	0	0	13 (6)	0
Balestier Khalsa	2010	S.League	29 (2)	0	3	0	1	0	33 (2)	0
Balestier Khalsa	2011	S.League	26 (2)	0	1	0	0 (1)	0	27 (3)	0
Balestier Khalsa	Total		68 (10)	0	4	0	1 (1)	0	73 (11)	0
Woodlands Wellington	2012	S.League	11 (4)	0	0	0	0 (1)	0	11 (5)	0

All numbers encased in brackets signify substitute appearances.
