= Shamsurin Abdul Rahman =

Singaporean footballer

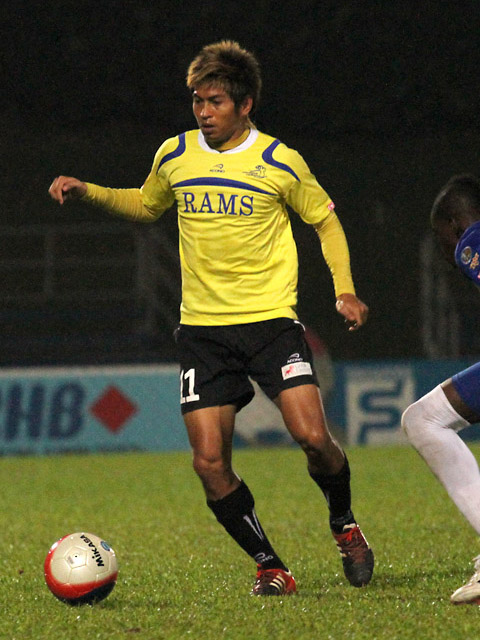
- Shamsurin Abdul Rahman in action for Woodlands Wellington in a S.League against Courts Young Lions at Woodlands Stadium on 15 June 2012.

Personal information
- Full name: Shamsurin Bin Abdul Rahman
- Date of birth: 27 November 1986 (age 39)
- Place of birth: Singapore
- Height: 1.70 m (5 ft 7 in)
- Position: Midfielder

Team information
- Current team: Admiralty FC
- Number: 7

Senior career*
Years	Team	Apps	(Gls)
2011	Balestier Khalsa Football Club	21	(0)
2012	Woodlands Wellington FC	22	(0)
2013–	Admiralty FC		
- * Club domestic league appearances and goals as of 4 November 2012

Shamsurin Abdul Rahman is a midfielder who last played for Woodlands Wellington FC in the S-League in Singapore.

Shamsurin made his first appearance in the S-League with Balestier Khalsa on 21 April 2011 and played for the Tigers during the 2011 season.

He then joined his former coach at Balestier Khalsa, Salim Moin, and as his teammates Ahmadulhaq Che Omar, Armanizam Dolah and K. Sathiaraj in their move over to Woodlands Wellington FC in 2012.

On 23 November 2012, it was announced by Woodlands Wellington that he would not be retained for the 2013 season. He then left for National Football League Division 1 side. Admiralty FC.He is now married to Nazeerah Binte Mohammad Nazir.

== Club Career Statistics ==
As of 4 November 2012

Shamsurin Abdul Rahman's Profile

Club Performance		League		Cup		League Cup		Total				
Singapore		S.League		Singapore Cup		League Cup		Total				
Club	Season	Apps	Goals	Apps	Goals	Apps	Goals	Yellow card	(yellow card) (yellow-red card)	Red card	Apps	Goals
Balestier Khalsa	2011	6 (15)	0	0 (1)	0	0 (1)	0	0	0	0	6 (17)	0
Woodlands Wellington	2012	14 (8)	0	1	0	0	0	0	0	0	15 (8)	0

All numbers encased in brackets signify substitute appearances.
