= Hussein Akil =

Association football player (born 1990)

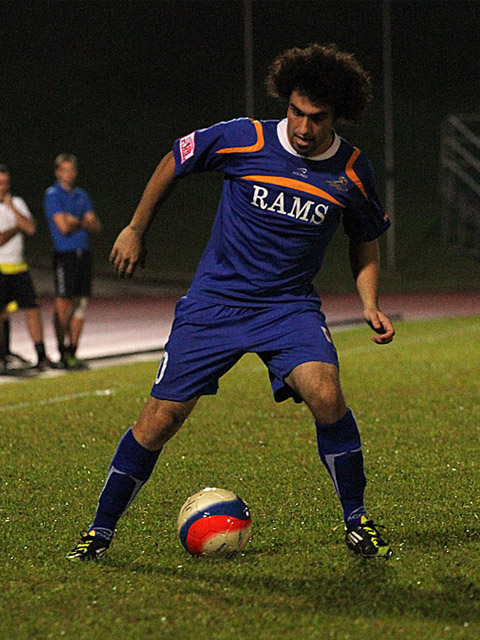
- Akil for Woodlands Wellington in 2012

Personal information
- Full name: Hussein Ali Akil
- Date of birth: 3 May 1990 (age 36)
- Place of birth: Australia
- Height: 1.73 m (5 ft 8 in)
- Position: Midfielder

Youth career
- 2009–2010: Sydney FC

Senior career*
Years	Team	Apps	(Gls)
2008–2010	Bankstown City Lions	28	(22)
2010–2011	Mabarra		
2011	Sydney Olympic	8	(0)
2012	Woodlands Wellington	19	(3)
2013–2015	Fraser Park	41+	(20)
2016	Hakoah Sydney City East	10	(3)
2017	Bankstown City Lions	24	(2)
2018–2021	St George FC	60	(17)

International career
2010	Lebanon U23	1	(0)
- * Club domestic league appearances and goals as of 11 November 2021

Hussein Ali Akil (Arabic: حُسَيْن عَلِيّ عَقِيل; born 3 May 1990) is a former footballer who played as a midfielder. Born in Australia, Akil played for the Lebanon national under-23 team.

== Club career ==
=== Early career ===
In 2008 Akil debuted for the Bankstown City Lions in the National Premier Leagues NSW aged 17. On 10 February 2011, it was announced that Akil had signed with the first-team of New South Wales Premier League side Sydney Olympic, having been transferred from Lebanese Premier League side Al-Mabarrah.

=== Woodlands Wellington ===
Akil debuted for S.League side Woodlands Wellington in a 1–0 away win against Young Lions on 12 February. One week later, Akil scored his first goal for his club in a 3–1 home win against Geylang United on 19 February. On 23 November 2012, it was announced by Woodlands Wellington that he would not be retained for the 2013 season.

=== Fraser Park ===
In 2013 Akil played for Fraser Park FC. He played two games in 2014, scoring once on 12 April against Hills Brumbies. In the 2015 NPL NSW 2 preseason cup, Akil played four games. He finished as the season top-goalscorer, with 13 goals.

=== Hakoah Sydney City East and Bankston ===
In 2016 Akil joined Hakoah Sydney City East, scoring three goals in 10 games during the 2016 NPL NSW. In 2017 he moved to Bankston City FC, playing 24 games and scoring twice in the 2017 NPL NSW 2.

=== St George FC ===
Akil joined NPL NSW 2 side St George FC in 2018, playing 25 games and scoring 10 in his first season. In 2019, as the club's captain, Akil played 24 games and scored 5. In 2020, he scored one goal in two games.

== International career ==
In 2008 Hussein represented Australia at U-19 Schoolboy level, where he participated in international friendlies in the United Kingdom.

In 2010, Akil was called up to the Lebanon national under-23 team by coach Emile Rustom, for a friendly against Syria on 23 December. Akil was substituted onto the field in the 45th minute for Mohamad Haidar, as Lebanon won the match 2–0.

== Career statistics ==
=== Club ===
As of 4 November 2012

Club	Season	League			Singapore Cup		League Cup		Total	
Club	Season	Division	Apps	Goals	Apps	Goals	Apps	Goals	Apps	Goals
Woodlands Wellington	2012	S.League	19	3	1	0	3	0	23	3
