= Lim Young-woo =

South Korean footballer

Personal information
- Date of birth: April 9, 1987 (age 39)
- Place of birth: South Korea
- Position: Defender

Senior career*
Years	Team	Apps	(Gls)
2010	Suwon Samsung Bluewings	0	(0)
2011	Balestier Khalsa FC	21	(1)
- * Club domestic league appearances and goals

Lim Young-woo (Korean: 임영우; born 9 April 1987) is a South Korean former professional footballer.

== Balestier Khalsa ==
Doing the obligatory bleep test as a trialist for Balestier Khalsa, Lim's defending abilities were praised by coach Salim Moin, who described him having good reading of the game and a threat to set-pieces and counter-attacks. He was the first player from the November S.League trials to find a club as well. Through the course of his time in Singapore, the defender scored once- leveling the score for his team with a header as Balestier salvaged a 1–1 draw.
