= Danny Chew Ji Xiang =

Singaporean footballer

Danny Chew
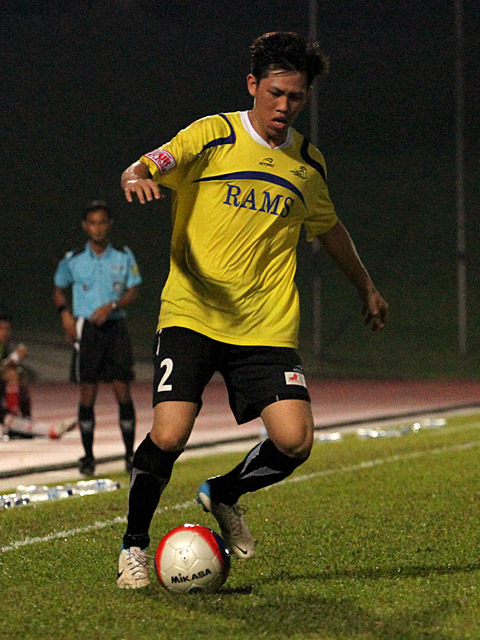
- Danny Chew in action for Woodlands Wellington in a Singapore League Cup match against Gombak United at Woodlands Stadium on 30 July 2012.

Personal information
- Full name: Chew Ji Xiang, Danny
- Date of birth: 6 November 1987 (age 39)
- Place of birth: Singapore
- Height: 1.75 m (5 ft 9 in)
- Position: Defender

Senior career*
Years	Team	Apps	(Gls)
2012	Woodlands Wellington FC	24	(1)
2013 to 2020	Tiong Bahru FC	140	(10)
- * Club domestic league appearances and goals as of 4 November 2012

Danny Chew (6 November 1987) is a defender who last played in the S.League for Woodlands Wellington FC.

Chew only turned professional in 2012 and played in his debut season with the Rams. He is known for his overlapping runs on the right flank to provide cover for his teammates and to add bite to any attacking moves, having great stamina to last for the whole game, a decent defender.

On 20 April 2012, Chew played for the first team squad for the first time in a friendly against NFL Division 2 side, Katong Football Club and he made his competitive debut on 27 April 2012 in a S-League match against Brunei DPMM FC.

On 23 November 2012, it was announced by Woodlands Wellington that Chew would be retained but due to work, he was unable to join for the 2013 season.

Chew continued playing for NFL Division 1 side Tiong Bahru FC and local futsal team MIB.

== Club career statistics ==
Club	Season	League	League		Cup		League Cup		Total	
Club	Season	League	Apps	Goals	Apps	Goals	Apps	Goals	Apps	Goals
Woodlands Wellington	2012	S.League	20	1	5	1	3	0	13 (1)	2

All numbers encased in brackets signify substitute appearances.
