= Nigel Vanu =

Singaporean footballer (born 1989)

Neil Vanu
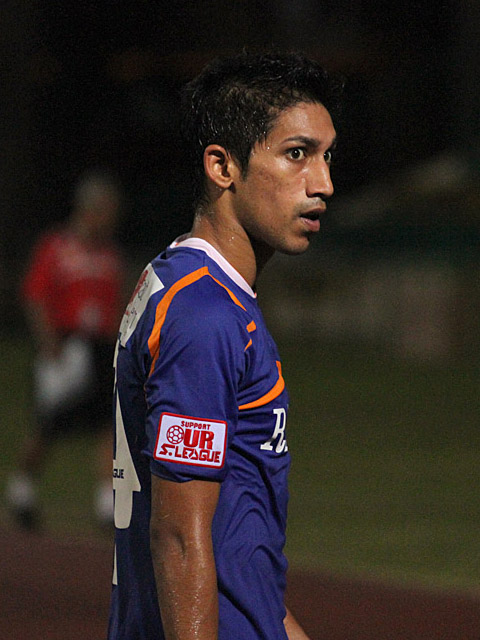
- Neil Vanu in action for Woodlands Wellington in a S.League match against Geylang United at Bedok Stadium on 21 June 2012.

Personal information
- Full name: Navin Neil Vanu
- Date of birth: 11 August 1989 (age 37)
- Place of birth: Singapore
- Height: 1.75 m (5 ft 9 in)
- Position: Striker

Senior career*
Years	Team	Apps	(Gls)
2010–2011	Woodlands Wellington FC	46	(1)
2011–2012	Courts Young Lions	16	(1)
2012	Woodlands Wellington FC	4	(0)

International career
2011 –	Singapore Under-23	2	(1)
- * Club domestic league appearances and goals as of 4 November 2012

Navin Neil Vanu (born Navin Nigel Vanu, 11 August 1989) is a Singaporean footballer who last played as a striker for Woodlands Wellington FC. Apart from playing as a forward, he can also operate effectively as a winger.

== Club career ==
Having played for Geylang United and Woodlands Wellington in his youth, Neil was promoted to the senior squad of the Rams in 2010, where he made 28 appearances for the northern side in his maiden season with the senior squad. His speed and nifty footwork were soon noticed by Slobodan Pavković, the coach of the Singapore Under-23 squad and he was soon drafted into the Young Lions in the midst of the 2011 season in preparation for the 2011 Southeast Asian Games held in Indonesia later that year. However, his appearances were limited as he found it hard to break through the squad.

In June 2012, it was announced that Neil Vanu would return to his former club, Woodlands Wellington, during the mid-season transfer window and will be assigned the number 34 jersey.

On 21 June 2012, Neil made his re-debut for Woodlands in a match against Geylang United.

On 23 November 2012, it was announced by Woodlands Wellington that he would not be retained for the 2013 season.

=== Club career statistics ===
As of 4 November 2012

Navin Neil Vanu's Profile

Club Performance		League		Cup		League Cup		Total				
Singapore		S.League		Singapore Cup		League Cup		Total				
Club	Season	Apps	Goals	Apps	Goals	Apps	Goals	Yellow card	(yellow card) (yellow-red card)	Red card	Apps	Goals
Woodlands Wellington	2010	9 (19)	0	0	0	1 (2)	1	6	0	0	10 (21)	1
Woodlands Wellington	2011	12 (6)	1	0	0	0	0	6	0	0	12 (6)	1
Courts Young Lions	2011	9 (1)	1	0	0	0	0	3	0	1	9 (1)	1
Courts Young Lions	2012	1 (5)	0	0	0	0	0	1	0	0	1 (5)	0
Woodlands Wellington	2012	3 (1)	0	0	0	3	0	0	0	0	6 (1)	0

All numbers encased in brackets signify substitute appearances.

== International career ==
Neil is probably most remembered for being sent off in the Singapore Under-23 team's SEA Games Group A match against Indonesia. He got a red card in the 23rd minute of the match after picking up his second yellow for hitting an Indonesian player while they were tussling for the ball. He has since apologised publicly for the incident.

Neil also left a huge impression by coming on as a substitute against Cambodia and scoring the winner in the 74th minute of the match with a firm header off Yasir Hanapi's cross.

=== International appearances for U23 teams ===
National team	Year	Apps	Goals
Singapore U23	2011	2	1
Career total		2	1

=== International goals ===
#	Date	Venue	Opponent	Score	Result	Competition
1.	9 November 2011	Senayan Stadium, Jakarta, Indonesia	Cambodia	2–1	2–1	2011 Southeast Asian Games
Updated 1 July 2012
