= Farhan Hairoddin =

Singaporean footballer

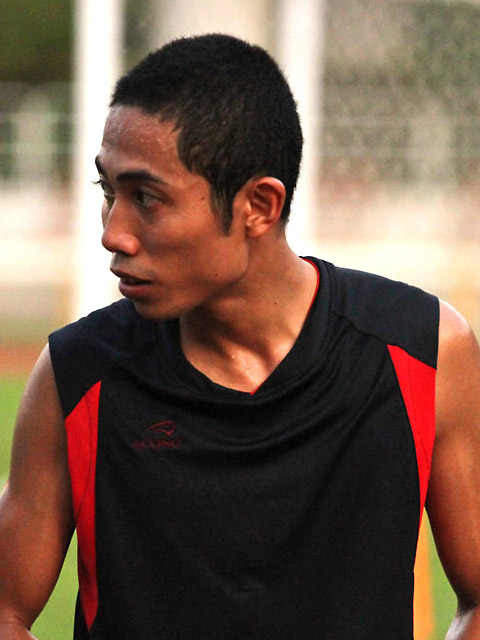
- Farhan Hairoddin during a training session with Woodlands Wellington in 2012.

Personal information
- Full name: Farhan bin Hairoddin
- Date of birth: May 4, 1989 (age 37)
- Place of birth: Singapore
- Height: 1.76 m (5 ft 9 1/2 in)
- Position: Defender

Senior career*
Years	Team	Apps	(Gls)
2011 – 2012	Woodlands Wellington FC	27	(1)
- * Club domestic league appearances and goals as of November 11, 2012

Farhan Hairoddin is a Singaporean footballer who last played for Woodlands Wellington FC, primarily in the Prime League.

On 23 November 2012, it was announced by Woodlands Wellington that he would not be retained for the 2013 season.

He made a total 6 appearances for the Rams, with 4 of those appearances as a substitute.

== Club career statistics ==
As of 4 November 2012

Club Performance		League		Cup		League Cup		Total				
Singapore		S.League		Singapore Cup		League Cup		Total				
Club	Season	Apps	Goals	Apps	Goals	Apps	Goals	Yellow card	(yellow card) (yellow-red card)	Red card	Apps	Goals
Woodlands Wellington	2011	2 (3)	0	1	0	0	0	0	0	0	3 (3)	0
Woodlands Wellington	2012	25 (1)	1	0	0	-	-	9	2	0	25 (1)	1

All numbers encased in brackets signify substitute appearances.
