= Ang Bang Heng =

Singaporean footballer

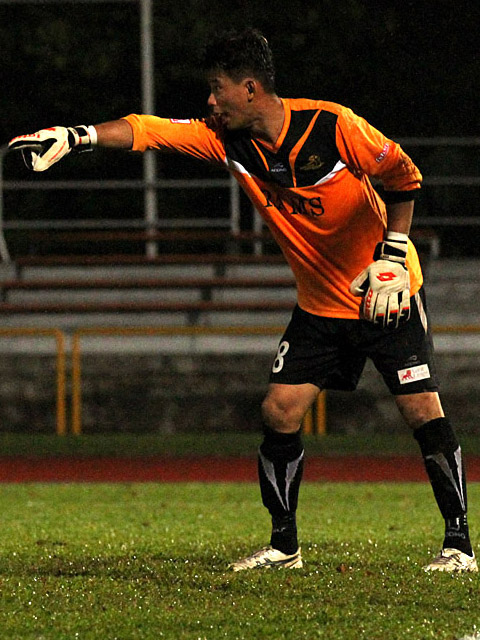
- Ang Bang Heng in action against Gombak United in a Singapore League Cup match held on 30 July 2012 at Woodlands Stadium.

Personal information
- Date of birth: August 21, 1980 (age 46)
- Place of birth: Singapore
- Height: 1.80 m (5 ft 11 in)
- Position: Goalkeeper

Youth career
- 2003: Tampines Rovers (Prime League)

Senior career*
Years	Team	Apps	(Gls)
2004	Tampines Rovers SC 1951		
2005 – 2008	Balestier Khalsa		
2009 – 2010	Katong FC		
2011 – 2012	Woodlands Wellington FC		
2013–	Katong FC	20	(0)
- * Club domestic league appearances and goals

Ang Bang Heng is a retired goalkeeper who last played for Woodlands Wellington FC in the S-League. He is currently the assistant goalkeeping coach for Woodlands Wellington.

He was part of the Tampines Rovers SC 1951 team which won the Singapore Pools FA Cup in 2004 and also played for Balestier Khalsa, as well as Katong FC in the NFL Division 2 before joining the Rams in 2011, where he featured prominently with 21 appearances in his first season.

Bang Heng also received a medal with Balestier Khalsa when the Tigers finished second runners-up in the 2008 Singapore League Cup.

He officially retired from professional football on 5 November 2012 following the last match of the 2012 season against Tanjong Pagar United.

Ang was known for his vocal presence in the penalty box and aerial ability.

== Club Career Statistics ==
Club	Season	League	League		Cup		League Cup		Total	
Club	Season	League	Apps	Goals	Apps	Goals	Apps	Goals	Apps	Goals
Woodlands Wellington	2011	S.League	18 (1)	0	1	0	1	0	20 (1)	0
Woodlands Wellington	2012	S.League	1	0	1	0	3	0	5	0

All numbers encased in brackets signify substitute appearances.
