= Aloysius Yap =

Singaporean footballer

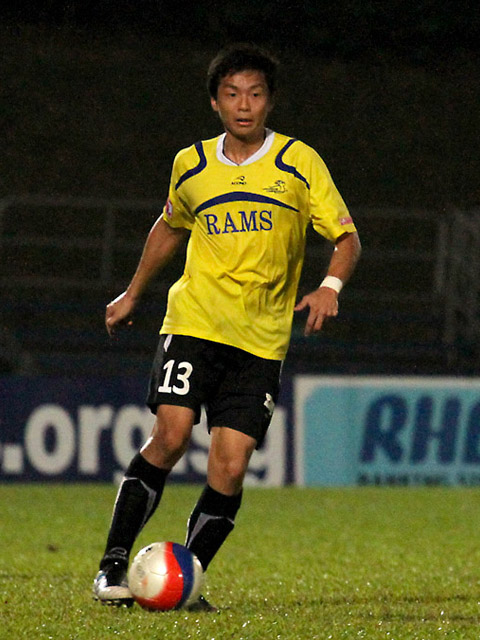
- Aloysius Yap in action for Woodlands Wellington FC during the 2012 S.League season.

Personal information
- Full name: Yap Sheng Wei, Aloysius
- Date of birth: October 20, 1987 (age 39)
- Place of birth: Singapore
- Height: 1.74 m (5 ft 8 1/2 in)
- Position: Midfielder

Team information
- Current team: Tiong Bahru FC
- Number: 13

Senior career*
Years	Team	Apps	(Gls)
2009	Balestier Khalsa	11	(0)
2010 – 2011	Gombak United	13	(0)
2012	Woodlands Wellington FC	10	(1)
2016	Yishun Sentek Mariners		
2017-2019	SAFSA		
2022	Tiong Bahru FC		
- * Club domestic league appearances and goals as of Jul 30, 2012

Aloysius Yap is a Singaporean former footballer who last played in the S.League for Woodlands Wellington FC.

Yap started off his S.League career with Balestier Khalsa in 2009, before moving on Gombak United in 2010. He moved to Woodlands Wellington FC in 2012 and made his debut for the Rams in their match against Tampines Rovers shortly after passing his beep test for the club.

He scored his first professional goal of his career while playing for Woodlands Wellington during a 3–1 loss to Tampines Rovers in a preliminary round match of the Starhub League Cup on 27 July 2012.

In August 2012, Aloysius left football to concentrate on a career in the private sector.

In 2018 FA Cup third-placing match, Aloysius scored a hat trick to give Singapore Arm Forces SA (SAFSA) a 5-0 victory over Admiralty CSC .

While working as an OCBC Premier Banking relationship manager, Aloysius was one of the three nominees for 2019 National Football League Division One Player of the Year.
