= Fabien Lewis =

Trinidad and Tobago footballer (born 1982)

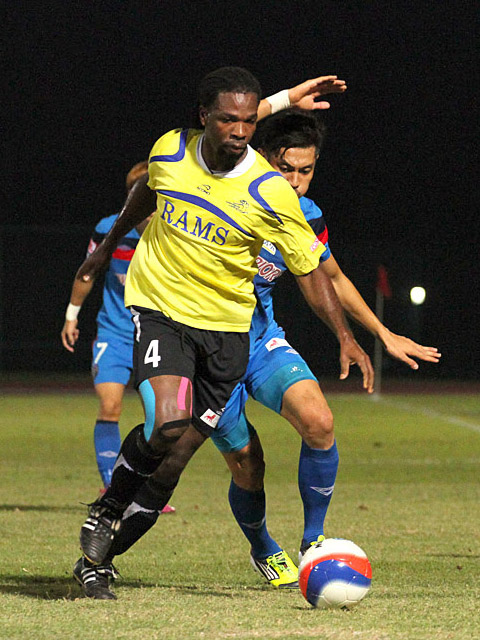
- Lewis (in yellow strip) in action for Woodlands Wellington in a S. League match against SAFFC at Choa Chu Kang Stadium, 13 September 2012

Personal information
- Full name: Fabien Larry Lewis
- Date of birth: 10 August 1982 (age 44)
- Place of birth: San Fernando, Trinidad and Tobago
- Height: 6 ft 0 in (1.83 m)
- Position: Defender

Youth career
- 2003–2005: Canisius Golden Griffins
- 2005–2006: George Mason Patriots

Senior career*
Years	Team	Apps	(Gls)
2007	Western Mass Pioneers	18	(0)
2008	Michigan Bucks	10	(0)
2009	Real Maryland Monarchs	14	(0)
2010	Atlético de San Juan FC	14	(0)
2012	Woodlands Wellington FC	20	(0)
2013	Central F.C.	3	(0)
2013–2014	Kaya FC	7	(0)

International career
1999	Trinidad and Tobago U17	5	
2001	Trinidad and Tobago U23	1	

Managerial career
- 2015: Kaya
- * Club domestic league appearances and goals as of 23:00, 13 June 2013 (UTC)

Fabien "Fari" Lewis (born 10 August 1982) is a retired professional footballer from Trinidad and Tobago.

== Career ==
=== Youth and college ===
Lewis attended Naparima College, and came from his native Trinidad to the United States to play college soccer at Canisius College in 2003. At Canisius Lewis was honoured with the MAAC All Rookie, All Conference, All Region Team nominations, and was the Conference Defensive Player of the Year in 2003, prior to transferring to George Mason University as a junior in 2006. At George Mason he was named team Defensive Player of the Year, NSCAA All-South Atlantic Region Third Team, CAA All-Conference Second team and CAA All-Tournament Team.

=== Professional ===
Lewis signed for the Western Mass Pioneers in the USL Second Division in 2007, and made his professional debut on 27 April 2007 in the Pioneers' 2–0 opening day loss to the Charlotte Eagles. While at Western Mass Pioneers, his defensive efforts were credited with several USL Second Division Team of the Week honours.

He decided to play for the Michigan Bucks the following season in the USL Premier Development League playing 10 games for the team helping to guide them to their Great Lakes Division title and regular season championship, before signing for the Real Maryland Monarchs in 2009. While at the Monarchs, he played an integral role in anchoring the teams' defence; helping guide them to their first ever quarter-finals spot in the post-season.

He later went on to sign with Atlético de San Juan FC of the Puerto Rico Soccer League. While with Atletico, he was part of the teams surprising play-offs semi-final victory against Club Atlético River Plate Puerto Rico. As a result, Atlético de San Juan FC advanced to the grand final where they played Bayamón FC in a home and away series but eventually lost 3–2 on aggregate.

In 2012, Fabien moved to Singapore to play for Woodlands Wellington FC in the S-League. He has been praised for his solid performance at the back on his debut against Courts Young Lions.

On 14 January 2013, Lewis favoured playing in the TT Pro League and signed with newcomers, Central F.C. for the closing stage of the league 2012/2013 season. Central F.C. is owned by former World Cup and Dundee United player Brent Sancho and coached by former Tottenham Hotspur F.C. and former England national football team player, Terry Fenwick. On 16 February, Lewis made his debut for Central FC against 2012 Concacaf club championship participant, Caledonia AIA. Fabien had an assist in a goal where Central FC went on to win the game 3–2.

During the March 2013 mid season United Football League transfer window, Fabien successfully acquired a contract with Kaya FC.

=== Club career statistics ===
As of 13 June 2013

Fabien Lewis's Profile

Club Performance		League		Cup		League Cup		Total				
USA		USL Second Division		--		--		Total				
Club	Season	Apps	Goals	Apps	Goals	Apps	Goals	Yellow card	(yellow card) (yellow-red card)	Red card	Apps	Goals
Real Maryland F.C.	2009	12 (1)	0	2	-	-	-	2	0	0	14 (1)	0
Singapore		S.League		Singapore Cup		League Cup						
Club	Season	Apps	Goals	Apps	Goals	Apps	Goals	Yellow card	(yellow card) (yellow-red card)	Red card	Apps	Goals
Woodlands Wellington	2012	19 (1)	0	1	0	0	0	3	0	0	20 (1)	0
Trinidad and Tobago		TT Pro League		FA Trophy		League Cup						
Club	Season	Apps	Goals	Apps	Goals	Apps	Goals	Yellow card	(yellow card) (yellow-red card)	Red card	Apps	Goals
Central F.C.	2012/13	2	0	1	0	-	-	3	0	0	3	0
Philippines		United Football League		PFF National Championship		League Cup						
Club	Season	Apps	Goals	Apps	Goals	Apps	Goals	Yellow card	(yellow card) (yellow-red card)	Red card	Apps	Goals
Kaya F.C.	2013	7	0	0	0	0	0	4	0	1	7	0

All numbers encased in brackets signify substitute appearances.

=== International ===
Lewis made appearances for Trinidad and Tobago's U-17 and U-23 teams. In December 2002, he was invited by Hannibal Najar to train with the senior national team but did not make a single official cap.

=== Coaching ===
In May 2015, he was appointed as interim head coach of Kaya F.C. after their former head coach resigned at the middle of the 2015 United Football League season. He served the post until the end of the season and helped Kaya F.C. qualify for the 2016 edition of AFC Cup (the first time in the club's history).

In April 2019, Coach Fabien was announced as Director of Coaching U9-U12 at Lee Mount Vernon Sports Club in Alexandria, Virginia. Drawing on his experience as a player and coach, he guides the technical and tactical direction for both boys and girls at the earliest level of training in travel soccer. In September 2020, Coach Fabien was promoted to Director of Coaching of the entire club and then in 2022 was promoted to Technical Director.
