= Goh Swee Swee =

Singaporean footballer

Goh Swee Swee 吴瑞瑞
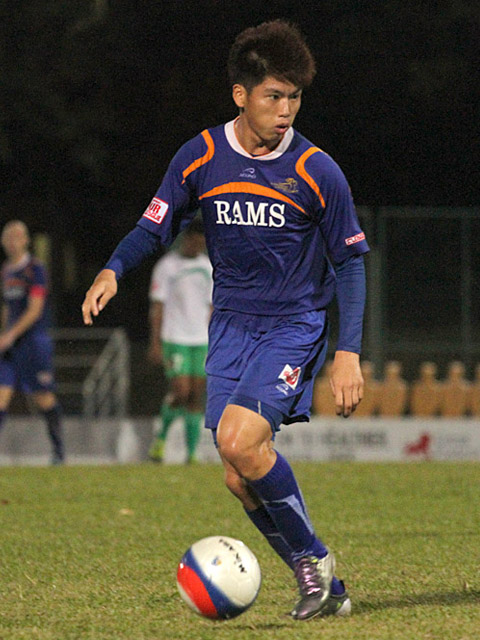
- Goh Swee Swee in action for Woodlands Wellington in a S.League match against Geylang United at Bedok Stadium on 21 June 2012.

Personal information
- Full name: Goh Swee Swee, Damien
- Date of birth: 2 June 1986 (age 40)
- Place of birth: Singapore
- Height: 1.71 m (5 ft 7 in)
- Position: Forward

Team information
- Current team: Eunos Crescent
- Number: 19

Senior career*
Years	Team	Apps	(Gls)
2004–2006	Gombak United	1	(0)
2007	Home United	10	(1)
2008–2009	Young Lions	37	(2)
2010	Balestier Khalsa	12	(0)
2011–2014	Woodlands Wellington	93	(10)
2015	Hougang United	4	(0)
2016	Tiong Bahru FC	14	
2017	Eunos Crescent		
2018-2022	Tiong Bahru FC		
2023	Warwick Knights		(7)
2024	Jungfrau Punggol		(9)

International career^{‡}
2007	Singapore	0	(0)
- * Club domestic league appearances and goals as of 27 March 2015 ‡ National team caps and goals as of 16 October 2008

Goh Swee Swee (simplified Chinese: 吴瑞瑞; traditional Chinese: 吳瑞瑞; pinyin: Wú Ruì Ruì; Pe̍h-ōe-jī: Ngôo Suī-suī; born 1 June 1986) is a Singaporean footballer who plays as a forward for Hougang United in the S-League.

== Club career ==
Goh started his S-league career with Gombak United but only played 1 game for the Bulls before joining Home United in 2007. At that time, the Protectors offered him a S.League contract while he was still on a Prime League contract with Gombak. He immediately repaid the favour to the Protectors by scoring a 90th-minute winner against Liaoning Guangyuan in his debut on 16 March 2007.

However, Goh found it hard to start upfront with Home United having the likes of Peres de Oliveira, Indra Sahdan and Ludovick Takam in their ranks. As a result, he was often deployed as a rightback or right midfielder.

Goh was then transferred to the Courts Young Lions in 2008 and he played mostly as a midfielder for the Young Lions in the S.League.

Following his stint with the Young Lions, Goh had a brief spell at Balestier Khalsa in 2010 before switching over to his current club, Woodlands Wellington with fellow tiger, midfielder Han Yiguang in the 2011 pre-season. Goh is the second top scorer for Woodlands for the past 2 seasons, netting 5 goals after 31 appearances in 2011 and 4 goals in 23 appearances in 2012.

Goh achieved a personal milestone when he led Woodlands Wellington out during their match against Home United at Bishan Stadium as the team captain in the first time in his career on 5 March 2013.

Goh signed for 2016 Singapore National Football League champions Eunos Crescent for the 2017 NFL season.

== Career statistics ==
As of 16 July 2013

Goh Swee Swee's Profile

Appearances and goals by club, season and competition
Club	Season	League			National cup (Note: Includes Singapore Cup)		League cup (Note: Includes League Cup)		Total				
Club	Season	Division	Apps	Goals	Apps	Goals	Apps	Goals	Yellow card	(yellow card) (yellow-red card)	Red card	Apps	Goals
Young Lions	2009	S.League	8 (2)	1	0	0	0	0	1	0	0	8 (2)	1
Balestier Khalsa	2010	S.League	4 (8)	0	0 (1)	0	0	0	4	1	0	4 (9)	0
Woodlands Wellington	2011	S.League	21 (9)	5	1	0	0	0	8	0	0	22 (9)	5
Woodlands Wellington	2012	S.League	20 (3)	4	1	0	2	0	6	1	0	23 (3)	4
Woodlands Wellington	2013	S.League	4 (9)	1	0 (1)	0	1 (3)	0	3	0	0	5 (13)	1
Tiong Bahru FC	2016	NFL Div 1	4 (10)	10	0	0	0	0	0	0	0	4 (10)	10
Warwick Knights	2023	SFL Div 1	0	7	0	0	0	0	0	0	0	0	7
Jungfrau Punggol	2024	SFL Div 2	0	9	0	0	0	0	0	0	0	0	9

All numbers encased in brackets signify substitute appearances.

== International career ==
Goh was called up to the national team on a couple of occasions but he has yet to appear for the Lions in an international match.
