= Duncan David Elias =

Singaporean footballer (born 1985)

Duncan Elias
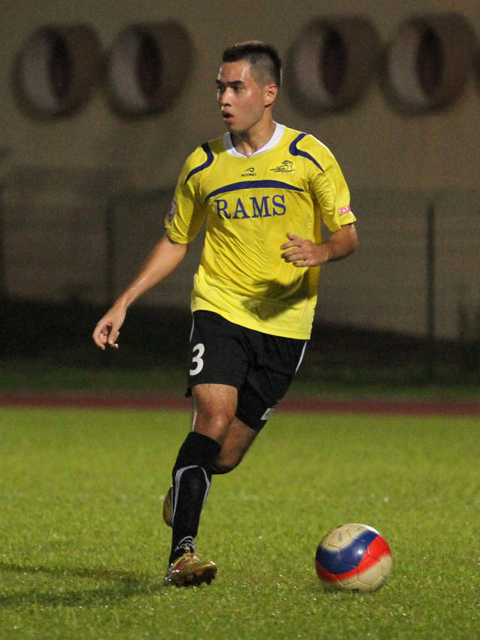
- Duncan Elias in action for Woodlands Wellington in a S.League match during the 2012 S.League season.

Personal information
- Full name: Duncan David Elias
- Date of birth: 14 July 1985 (age 41)
- Place of birth: Singapore
- Height: 1.71 m (5 ft 7 1/2 in)
- Position: Defender

Team information
- Current team: Geylang International
- Number: 5

Senior career*
Years	Team	Apps	(Gls)
2010–2011	Hougang United	43	(1)
2011–2012	Woodlands Wellington FC	35	(0)
2013	Geylang International	0	(0)
- * Club domestic league appearances and goals as of 4 January 2013

Duncan David Elias (born 14 July 1985) is a Singaporean footballer who played as a defender in the S.League for Geylang International.

== Club career ==
Duncan is known for being a set-piece specialist and is a regular corner taker for corners on the right side of the pitch due to his ability to deliver in-swinging crosses with his left foot.

On 23 November 2012, Woodlands Wellington announced that he would not be retained for the 2013 season.

On 4 January 2013, it was confirmed during a press conference by the Eagles that Duncan would be moving to Geylang International.

He was unable to secure a long-term contract with any football team in 2014.

== Club career statistics ==
As of 4 November 2012

Club Performance		League		Cup		League Cup		Total				
Singapore		S.League		Singapore Cup		League Cup		Total				
Club	Season	Apps	Goals	Apps	Goals	Apps	Goals	Yellow card	(yellow card) (yellow-red card)	Red card	Apps	Goals
Sengkang Punggol	2010	32	0	1	0	3 (1)	0	5	0	0	36	0
Hougang United	2011	10 (1)	1	0	0	0	0	3	0	0	10 (1)	1
Woodlands Wellington	2011	14 (1)	0	0	0	1	0	0	0	0	15 (1)	0
Woodlands Wellington	2012	19 (1)	0	1	0	3	0	5	0	0	23 (1)	0

All numbers encased in brackets signify substitute appearances.
