= Salim Moin =

Singaporean footballer and coach (1961–2020)

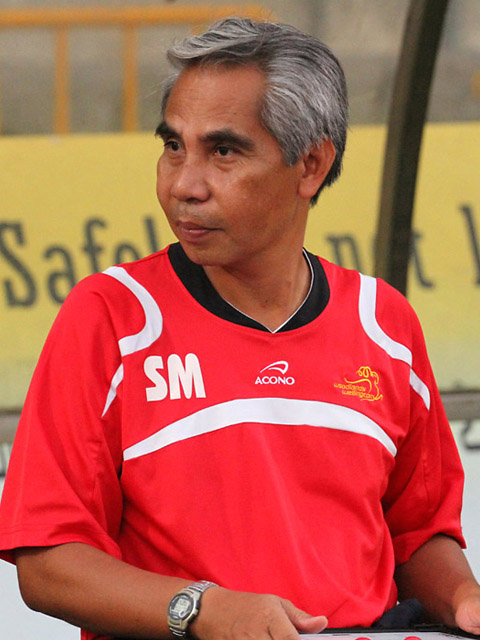
- Salim Moin with Woodlands Wellington in 2012.

Personal information
- Full name: Salim Bin Moin
- Date of birth: 26 September 1961
- Place of birth: Singapore
- Date of death: 6 November 2020 (aged 59)
- Place of death: Singapore
- Position: Midfielder

Senior career*
Years	Team	Apps	(Gls)
1979–1993	Singapore FA	176	(63)

International career
- Singapore

Managerial career
- 2006–2007: Gombak United
- 2009–2010: National Football Academy (coach)
- 2011: Balestier Khalsa
- 2012–2013: Woodlands Wellington
- 2014: Tampines Rovers
- 2014: Woodlands Wellington
- 2015: Hougang United
- 2019: Hougang United (assistant manager)
- * Club domestic league appearances and goals as of 25 March 2015

Salim bin Moin (26 September 1961 – 6 November 2020) was a Singaporean footballer who played for the Singapore national football team and managed S.League side Hougang United.

He played for the Lions in the Malaysia Cup during the 1980s alongside stars such as David Lee, Terry Pathmanathan, S. Anthonysamy, Malek Awab and Borhan Abu Samah. During his playing career, Salim was handed a six-year ban from 1984 for assaulting referee M. Kunalan in a President's Cup match between Jubilee and Farrer Park United in September 1983; the ban was lifted at the end of 1986 following a successful third appeal.

== Club career ==
In 1983, Salim and five other players from Jubilee Sports Association assaulted referee M. Kunalan in a President's Cup match between Jubilee and Farrer Park United in September 1983. The six players were banned for six years from football matches. Five of them, including Salim, were also fined $200. Salim's ban was lifted at the end of 1986 following a successful third appeal.

== Coaching career ==
After retiring, Salim started his coaching career with NFL side Tampines SC at the end of the 1996.

Salim spent two seasons with Gombak United as their Prime League and senior team coach before he joined National Football Academy for two years in 2009-2010. At the end of his NFA contract, he joined Balestier Khalsa Football Club, first as an assistant coach to Nasaruddin Jalil for the 2010 season, and as head coach for their 2011 season. In 2012, he replaced R. Balasubramaniam as the head coach of Woodlands Wellington FC, who were seeking to rejuvenate their squad after two disappointing seasons as recipients of consecutive wooden spoons.

Several players from Balestier also followed Salim after his switch to Woodlands, including young midfielders Armanizam Dolah, Shamsurin Abdul Rahman and K. Sathiaraj, as well as custodian Ahmadulhaq Che Omar, who was back with a second stint at the northern club.

Although the Rams finished last with their third successive wooden spoon in as many seasons during their first season under Salim, he was working with players who were chosen under former Woodlands coach, R. Balasubramaniam. After a major clearout of the team following the end of the 2012 season, he was given a chance to transfer in some of his preferred players for the 2013 season. He has also targeted a top six finish for the club during a pre-season interview in December 2012, which is a higher target than the top eight finish set by the club a month earlier.

Appointed as Tampines Rovers head coach at the start of the 2014 season, Salim only lasts until 27 April 2014, when he resigned as Tampines coach following the club's exit from the 2014 AFC Cup.

Salim made his return to Woodlands Wellington as head coach in June 2014, replacing sacked Darren Stewart. After the merger of Woodlands Wellington with Hougang United in 2015, Salim was announced as the new head coach of Hougang United. Towards the end of that season, Salim was replaced by K. Balagumaran, as Hougang would eventually finished last in the table.

== International goals ==
No.	Date	Venue	Opponent	Score	Result	Competition
1.	1 June 1983	Kallang, Singapore	Philippines	2–0	5–0	1983 SEA Games
2.	1 June 1983	Kallang, Singapore	Philippines	3–0	5–0	1983 SEA Games
3.	1 June 1983	Kallang, Singapore	Philippines	4–0	5–0	1983 SEA Games
4.	1 June 1983	Kallang, Singapore	Philippines	5–0	5–0	1983 SEA Games
5.	4 June 1983	Kallang, Singapore	Brunei	4–0	4–0	1983 SEA Games

== Death ==
Salim died on 6 November 2020 at age 59 due to a heart attack.

== Coaching career statistics ==
=== League career statistics ===
Club	Season	P	W	D	L	Win %
(Singapore) Balestier Khalsa	2011	24	7	5	12	29.17
(Singapore) Woodlands Wellington	2012	24	3	5	16	12.50
(Singapore) Woodlands Wellington	2013	14	4	5	5	28.57

Key: P–games played, W–games won, D–games drawn; L–games lost, %–win percentage
Updated on 7 June 2013. Only data for matches played in the S.League are tabulated.

=== Cup competition statistics ===
- 2012 Singapore Cup – First Round
- 2012 Singapore League Cup – Plate Competition Semi-Finalists

== Honours ==
Singapore FA

- Malaysia Cup: 1980
- Sultan Haji Ahmad Shah Cup: 1989
