= Edward Tan (footballer) =

Singaporean footballer

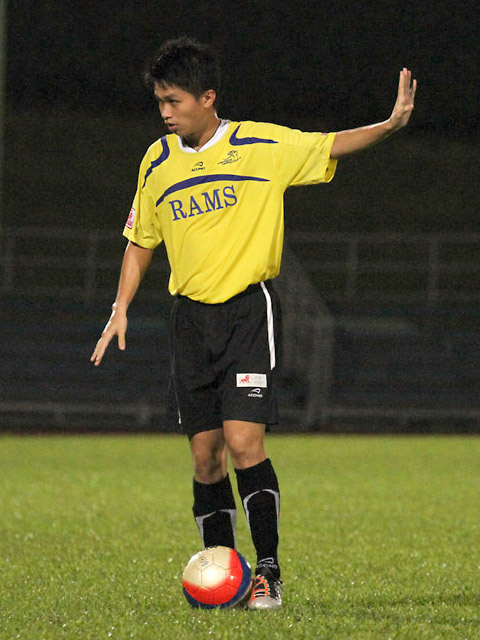

Personal information
- Full name: Tan Jia Hong, Edward
- Date of birth: March 27, 1985 (age 41)
- Place of birth: Singapore
- Height: 1.78 m (5 ft 10 in)
- Position: Defender

Senior career*
Years	Team	Apps	(Gls)
2009 – 2011	Tampines Rovers	18	(1)
2012	Woodlands Wellington FC	7	(0)
- * Club domestic league appearances and goals as of Jun 16, 2012

Edward Tan is a retired footballer who last played in the S.League for Woodlands Wellington FC. Known for his mercurial left foot, he was often deployed to take direct free kicks for the team. He was equally adept at playing as a left back or centre back.

Tan was part of the Tampines Rovers Prime League team from 2009 to 2011. He was released by the club in 2012 and completed his transfer as a free agent for Woodlands Wellington FC in March, impressing the media and fans alike on his debut against Gombak United just days later.

During the 2012 mid-season break, Edward decided to leave the club to pursue a normal career outside of football.

He played a total of 7 games for the Rams, coming on as a substitute in 2 of those matches.
