= Armanizam Dolah =

Singaporean footballer

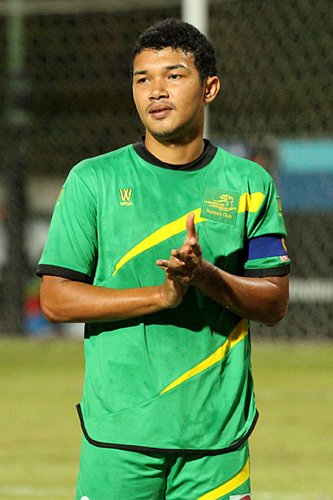
- Armanizam Dolah in action for Woodlands Wellington in a S.League match against SAFFC at Choa Chu Kang Stadium on 13 September 2012.

Personal information
- Full name: Armanizam Bin Dolah
- Date of birth: 26 November 1987 (age 38)
- Place of birth: Singapore
- Height: 1.74 m (5 ft 8 1/2 in)
- Position: Midfielder

Team information
- Current team: Woodlands Wellington FC
- Number: 5

Senior career*
Years	Team	Apps	(Gls)
2010	Gombak United	4	(0)
2011	Balestier Khalsa Football Club	31	(0)
2012 – 2014	Woodlands Wellington FC	38	(0)
- * Club domestic league appearances and goals as of 16 July 2013

Armanizam Dolah is a Singaporean footballer who played as a midfielder for Woodlands Wellington FC in the S.League. He is the team captain of the Rams. He currently works at Marina Bay Sands.

He played with Balestier Khalsa Football Club in the 2011 S-League season before rejoining his Tigers coach, Salim Moin, at Woodlands Wellington FC in 2012.

He is one of the many players who switched from Balestier to Woodlands in the 2011 off-season, the others being Ahmadulhaq Che Omar, K. Sathiaraj and Shamsurin Abdul Rahman.

Armanizam was singled out as one of the exciting players to watch in the 2012 S-League and he was named as one of the top 10 signings of the 2012 S-League season by Voxsports.

Following his impressive performances in the 2012 season, Armanizam was handed the captain's armband for the 2013 season after similarly impressing Woodlands head coach Salim Moin and his coaching panel as the team captain during the Rams' pre-season friendlies.

== Club Career Statistics ==
As of 16 July 2013

Armanizam Dolah's Profile

Club Performance		League		Cup		League Cup		Total				
Singapore		S.League		Singapore Cup		League Cup		Total				
Club	Season	Apps	Goals	Apps	Goals	Apps	Goals	Yellow card	(yellow card) (yellow-red card)	Red card	Apps	Goals
Gombak United	2010	1 (3)	0	0	0	2	0	0	0	0	3 (3)	0
Balestier Khalsa	2011	24 (7)	0	1	0	0 (1)	0	9	0	0	25 (8)	0
Woodlands Wellington	2012	19 (1)	0	0	0	1 (1)	0	4	0	0	20 (2)	0
Woodlands Wellington	2013	12 (6)	0	1	0	0 (3)	0	3	0	0	13 (9)	0

All numbers encased in brackets signify substitute appearances.
