= Jeffrey Lightfoot =

Singaporean footballer

Jeffrey Adam Lightfoot (born 12 July 1995) is a Singaporean footballer who played in the 2010 Youth Olympic Games and won a bronze medal.

== Club career ==
Lightfoot played for the National Football Academy (NFA) under 16 team and was its captain.

In 2015, Lightfoot joined Warriors FC's Prime League team.

== International career ==
Lightfoot was part of the team which played at the 2009 Asian Youth Games. The team lost all its matches and finished last of their group.

In 2010, he played in the 2010 Youth Olympic Games and won a bronze medal with the team.

Lightfoot tore his calf muscle in a friendly match against Tampines Rovers under-18s in May 2011 and was unable to take part in the 2011 Lion City Cup.

In 2013, Lightfoot played in the AFF U-19 Youth Championship as part of the Singapore Under-18s team. Lightfoot continued to play for the various Singapore age groups teams.
