= Oswind Suriya =

Singaporean footballer

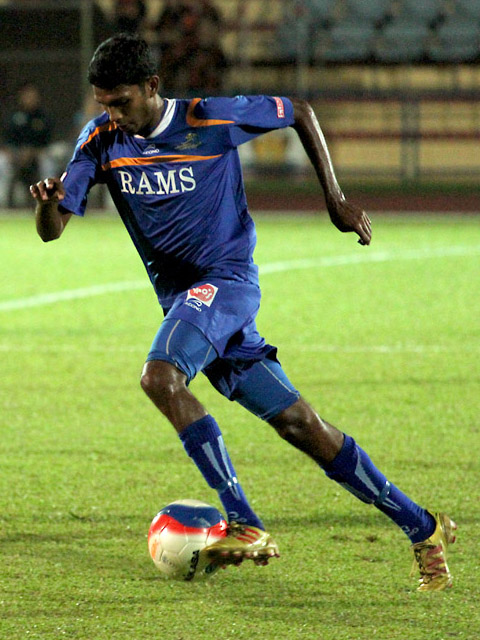
- Oswind Suriya in action for Woodlands Wellington in a S.League match against Hougang United at Hougang Stadium on 1 September 2012.

Personal information
- Full name: Oswind Suriya Rosayro
- Date of birth: 30 January 1989 (age 37)
- Place of birth: Singapore
- Height: 1.75 m (5 ft 9 in)
- Position: Midfielder

Youth career
- 2007: Sengkang Punggol FC
- 2008: Singapore NFA U-18
- 2009: Sengkang Punggol FC

Senior career*
Years	Team	Apps	(Gls)
2011 – 2014	Woodlands Wellington FC	22	(1)
2025	Serangoon Coolies FT (futsal)		

International career
2005 - 2010	Singapore men's national floorball team		
2015	Singapore national futsal team		
- * Club domestic league appearances and goals as of 16 July 2013

Oswind Suriya Rosayro (Sinhala: ඔස්වින්ඩ් සුරිය රෝසය්රෝ) is a Singaporean former footballer who played for Woodlands Wellington FC, primarily in the Prime League as a midfielder and is also a former national floorball player. As a footballer, Oswind was normally deployed as an attacking midfielder, winger or striker.

Oswind is also a football and floorball referee and a captain of Singapore national futsal team in 2015.

== Career ==
=== Football ===
Oswind first rose to prominence during his early playing days with Glasgow Hotspurs. And during the 2011 S.League season, where he was promoted to the S.League squad and featured in 2 first team matches in his first season. During the 2012 season, Oswind scored his first senior goal for Woodlands Wellington in a S.League match against Gombak United on 26 August 2012.

In 2012, Oswind attended the Football Association of Singapore’s (FAS) referees basic course while playing for Woollands Wellington.

In 2013, Oswind retired from football after the 2014 S.League season.

As of 2023, Oswind is a Class 1 referee. On 26 February 2023, he officiated his first match as an assistant referee in a Singapore Premier League match between Hougang United and Balestier Khalsa.

=== Futsal ===
Oswind was part of the Singapore national futsal team for the 2015 Asean Football Federation Futsal Championship. He made his return to competitive futsal in the inaugural amateur futsal league - Kyna Futsal League in 2025.

=== Floorball ===
Oswind was also a floorball player who participated in the Singapore Floorball League in his teens and has represented the Singapore national floorball team from 2005 to 2010.

Oswind is a floorball coach with several schools and also an international floorball referee.

== Club career statistics ==
As of 16 July 2013

Oswind Suriya's Profile

Club Performance		League		Cup		League Cup		Total				
Singapore		Prime League		FA Cup		--		Total				
Club	Season	Apps	Goals	Apps	Goals	Apps	Goals	Yellow card	(yellow card) (yellow-red card)	Red card	Apps	Goals
Woodlands Wellington	2012	12 (2)	3	0	0	-	-	1	0	0	12 (2)	3
Singapore		S.League		Singapore Cup		League Cup		Total				
Club	Season	Apps	Goals	Apps	Goals	Apps	Goals	Yellow card	(yellow card) (yellow-red card)	Red card	Apps	Goals
Woodlands Wellington	2011	0 (2)	0	0	0	0	0	0	0	0	0 (2)	0
Woodlands Wellington	2012	5 (9)	1	0	0	0 (3)	0	0	0	0	5 (12)	1
Woodlands Wellington	2013	2 (4)	0	0	0	3	2	0	0	0	5 (4)	2

All numbers encased in brackets signify substitute appearances.
