= Daniel Hammond =

English footballer

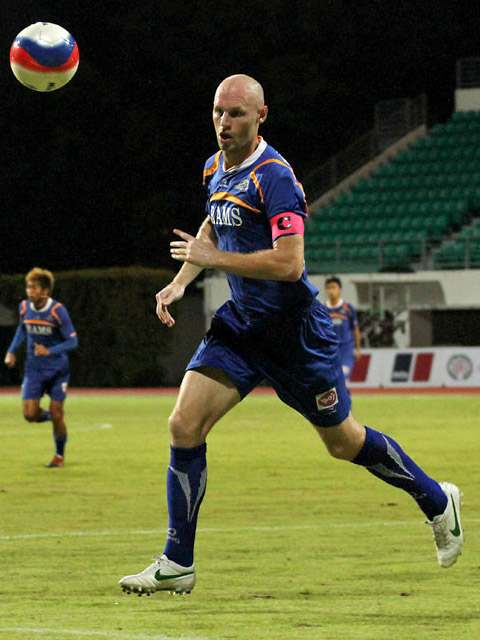
- Hammond in action for Woodlands Wellington in a S.League match during the 2012 S.League season.

Personal information
- Full name: Daniel Mark Hammond
- Date of birth: 6 April 1985 (age 41)
- Place of birth: King's Lynn, England
- Position: Central defender

Youth career
- 1994–1996: Norwich City
- 1996–2003: Cambridge United

Senior career*
Years	Team	Apps	(Gls)
2004–2006	King's Lynn		
- → Stamford (loan)
- → Wisbech Town (loan)
- → Diss Town (loan)
2008	Young Lions		
2009	Woodlands Wellington	28	(7)
2010	Balestier Khalsa	0	(0)
2010–2011	Singapore Armed Forces	38	(0)
2011	Geylang United	12	(1)
2012	Woodlands Wellington	23	(1)
- * Club domestic league appearances and goals as of 17:07, 21 November 2012 (UTC)

Daniel Mark Hammond (born 6 April 1985) is an English professional footballer who last played for S.League club Woodlands Wellington as a central defender.

== Career ==
Born in King's Lynn, Hammond played youth football in England with Norwich City and Cambridge United, before beginning his senior career with King's Lynn. While at King's Lynn, Hammond spent loan spells at Stamford, Wisbech Town and Diss Town.

After moving to Singapore with his girlfriend in 2007, Hammond has played for Young Lions, Woodlands Wellington, Balestier Khalsa, Singapore Armed Forces and Geylang United.

On 23 November 2012, Woodlands Wellington announced that he would not be retained for the 2013 season.

== Career statistics ==
As of 4 November 2012

Club	Season	League		Singapore Cup		League Cup		Other		Total	
Club	Season	Apps	Goals	Apps	Goals	Apps	Goals	Apps	Goals	Apps	Goals
Woodlands Wellington	2009	28	7	–	–	–	–	–	–	28	7
Woodlands Wellington	2012	23	1	–	–	–	–	–	–	23	1
Woodlands Wellington	Total	51	8	–	–	–	–	–	–	51	8
Singapore Armed Forces	2010	31	0	–	–	–	–	–	–	31	0
Singapore Armed Forces	2011	7	0	–	–	–	–	–	–	7	0
Singapore Armed Forces	Total	38	0	–	–	–	–	–	–	38	0
Geylang United	2011	12	1	–	–	–	–	–	–	12	1
Career total		101	9	–	–	–	–	–	–	101	9
