= Stanislav Vidaković =

Croatian footballer

Personal information
- Date of birth: 14 October 1985 (age 39)
- Place of birth: Croatia
- Height: 1.95 m (6 ft 5 in)
- Position(s): Defender

Senior career*
Years	Team	Apps	(Gls)
–2010	Omiš		
2010	Olimpik Sarajevo	0	(0)
2010	Fjölnir	15	(0)
2011	Laçi	11	(0)
2012	Hougang United	16	(3)
- * Club domestic league appearances and goals

Stanislav Vidaković (born 14 October 1985) is a Croatian retired footballer who is known to have last played for Hougang United of the Singaporean S.League in 2012. Retired 2013 (Cruciate ligament rupture).

== Career ==
Vidaković had a season in the Icelandic second tier.

=== Singapore ===
Despite earning a place in Goal.com's 2012 Round 6 S.League Team of the Week for his defensive performances countering Tampines Rovers, Vidaković was beleaguered by an eye infection through his tome there and had to take medicine.
