= Han Yiguang =

Singaporean footballer

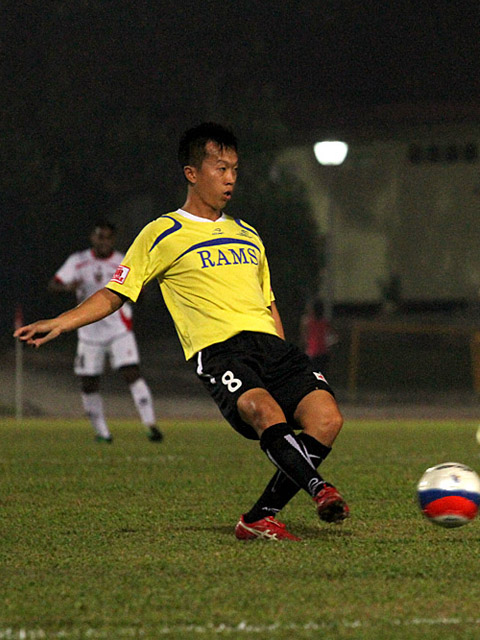
- Han Yiguang in action for Woodlands Wellington in a friendly match against Tiong Bahru FC (NFL) at Woodlands Stadium on 16 August 2012.

Personal information
- Date of birth: 2 February 1985 (age 41)
- Place of birth: Singapore
- Height: 1.73 m (5 ft 8 in)
- Positions: Defensive midfielder; right-back

Senior career*
Years	Team	Apps	(Gls)
2009–2010	Balestier Khalsa	27	(0)
2011–2012	Woodlands Wellington	37	(0)

Managerial career
- 2013: Woodlands Wellington (Youth Coach)
- 2014–2017: Balestier Khalsa
- 2018–2022: Hougang United (Youth Coach)
- 2022–: Schools Football Academy (Unleash the Roar project Coach)
- * Club domestic league appearances and goals

Han Yiguang is a former footballer who last played for Woodlands Wellington in the S-League as a defensive midfielder and right back. He is currently the coach for the School Football Academy programme, an initiative under Unleash The Roar! to raise the level of football in Singapore schools.

== Club career ==
Han started off his S-League career with Balestier Khalsa where he played a total of 27 matches in the span of two years before he decided to head to Woodlands Wellington to play for the Rams.

Despite his small frame, Han is known to be a tough tackling midfielder who helps the defence to snuff out opposing attacks. His combative spirit has drawn comparisons to former Woodlands captain and defensive midfielder, Goh Tat Chuan. Han plays as right-back occasionally too. He was even considered for national call-up at one point.

== Coaching career ==
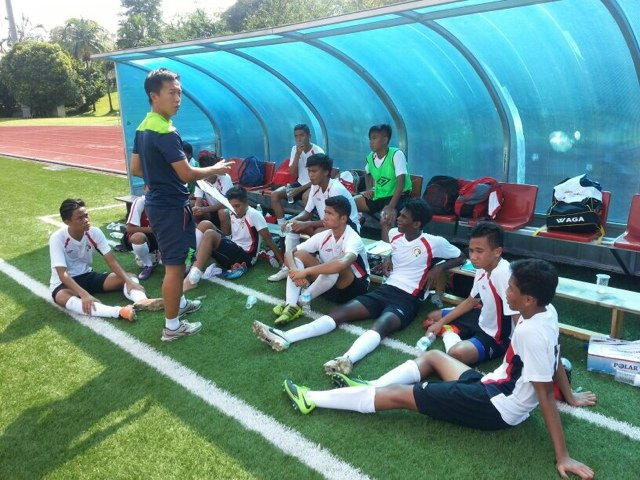
Han Yiguang coaching the Under-15 youth team at Balestier Khalsa FC.

In 2013, he retired from professional football and became to a Centre of Excellence football coach. He coached the Under-14 team at Woodlands Wellington.

In 2014, he joined Balestier Khalsa FC where he coached the under-15 team. In 2018, he joined Hougang United Football Club to coach its under-17 and under-21 teams. His coaching approach focuses on player development and incorporates modern coaching methods.

== Personal life ==
Han has a diploma in Sport and Wellness Management from Nanyang Polytechnic.

== Club Career Statistics ==
As of 4 November 2012

Han Yiguang's Profile

Club Performance		League		Cup		League Cup		Total				
Singapore		S.League		Singapore Cup		League Cup		Total				
Club	Season	Apps	Goals	Apps	Goals	Apps	Goals	Yellow card	(yellow card) (yellow-red card)	Red card	Apps	Goals
Balestier Khalsa	2009	6 (9)	0	0	0	0	0	4	1	0	6 (9)	0
Balestier Khalsa	2010	7 (5)	0	1	0	0 (1)	0	4	0	0	8 (6)	0
Woodlands Wellington	2011	22 (2)	0	1	0	1	0	12	0	0	24 (2)	0
Woodlands Wellington	2012	20 (2)	0	0 (1)	0	2	0	8	2	0	13 (3)	0

All numbers encased in brackets signify substitute appearances.
