= 2011 Woodlands Wellington FC season =

Woodlands Wellington
2011 season
- Chairman: (Singapore) Winson Song Ying Kong
- Coach: (Singapore) R. Balasubramaniam (head coach); (Singapore) Sivarajan S Thamby Muthu (assistant coach)
- S-League: 12th
- RHB Singapore Cup: 1st round
- Singapore League Cup: 1st round
- Top goalscorer: League: (South Korea) Moon Soon-Ho (8); All: (South Korea) Moon Soon-Ho (8)
Home colours	Away colours

The 2011 season was Woodlands Wellington's 16th competitive and consecutive season in the top flight of Singapore football and 24th year in existence as a football club.

== Transfers ==
=== In ===
==== Pre-season ====
Position	Player	Transferred from	Date	Source
DF	(Lebanon) Munier Raychouni	(Germany) SV Altlüdersdorf	1 January 2011	
DF	(Scotland) Graham Tatters	(United States) Tampa Bay Rowdies	1 January 2011	
FW	(Brazil) Leonardo Aleixa da Costa	(Ukraine) Volyn Lutsk	1 January 2011	
DF	(Guyana) Adrian Butters	(Canada) Toronto Lynx	1 January 2011	
DF	(Singapore) Madhu Mohana	(Singapore) Courts Young Lions	1 January 2011	
DF	(Singapore) Darrel Tan	(Singapore) Hougang United	1 January 2011	
MF	(Singapore) Jalal	(Singapore) Hougang United	1 January 2011	
GK	(Singapore) Amos Boon	(Singapore) Hougang United	1 January 2011	
MF	(Singapore) Han Yiguang	(Singapore) Balestier Khalsa	1 January 2011	
FW	(Singapore) Goh Swee Swee	(Singapore) Balestier Khalsa	1 January 2011	

==== Mid-season ====
Position	Player	Transferred from	Date	Source
DF	(Singapore) Duncan David Elias	(Singapore) Hougang United	1 June 2011	
FW	(South Korea) Moon Soon-Ho	(South Korea) Cheonan City FC	1 June 2011	
MF	(South Korea) Hyun Jong-Woon	(Singapore) Tanjong Pagar United FC	1 June 2011	
GK	(Singapore) Phang Chin Guan	Free Transfer	1 June 2011	
DF	(Japan) Fumiya Kobayashi	(Singapore) Hougang United	1 June 2011	

=== Out ===
==== Pre-season ====
Position	Player	Transferred To	Date	Source
FW	(Singapore) Rizawan Abdullah	(Singapore) Geylang United	1 January 2011	
MF	(Singapore) Andy Ahmad	(Singapore) Gombak United	1 January 2011	
DF	(Japan) Kazuki Yoshino	(Thailand) Sisaket F.C.	1 January 2011	
DF	(Singapore) Anaz Hadee	(Singapore) Balestier Khalsa	1 January 2011	
GK	(Singapore) Fajar Sarib	(Singapore) Home United	1 January 2011	
MF	(Singapore) Azlan Alipah	(Singapore) Tanjong Pagar United	1 January 2011	
DF	(Chile) Luis Eduardo Hicks	(Indonesia) Medan Chiefs	1 January 2011	
GK	(Singapore) Hafez Mawasi	(Singapore) Tampines Rovers	1 January 2011	
MF	(Singapore) Mohd Noor Ali	(Singapore) Hougang United	1 January 2011	
MF	(Singapore) Asraf Rashid	(Singapore) Home United	1 January 2011	
DF	(Singapore) Winston Yap	Retirement	1 January 2011	
GK	(Singapore) Khairul Annuar	Released	1 January 2011	
FW	(Morocco) Abdelhadi Laakkad	Released	1 January 2011	
MF	(Morocco) Rachid Lajane	Released	1 January 2011	
MF	(Singapore) Munasar Abdul Rashid	Released	1 January 2011	

==== Mid-season ====
Position	Player	Transferred To	Date	Source
DF	(Scotland) Graham Tatters	Released	1 June 2011	
FW	(Brazil) Leonardo Aleixa da Costa	Released	1 June 2011	
DF	(Guyana) Adrian Butters	Released	1 June 2011	
MF	(Singapore) Ali Imran Lomri	Singapore Recreation Club	1 July 2011	
GK	(Singapore) Amos Boon	Released	5 July 2011	

== Squads ==
=== First team squad ===
No.	Name	Nationality	Position (s)	Date of Birth (Age)	Signed from (Year Signed)
Goalkeepers
1	Phang Chin Guan	(Singapore)	GK	12 March 1982 (age 44)	Free Transfer (2011)
18	Ang Bang Heng	(Singapore)	GK	21 August 1980 (age 46)	(Singapore) Katong Football Club (2011)
Defenders
2	Fumiya Kobayashi	(Japan)	DF	11 May 1987 (age 39)	(Singapore) Hougang United (2011)
3	Duncan David Elias	(Singapore)	DF	14 July 1985 (age 41)	(Singapore) Hougang United (2011)
5	Sahairi Ramri	(Singapore)	DF	21 January 1987 (age 39)	(Singapore) Balestier Khalsa (2010)
6	Munier Raychouni	(Lebanon)	DF	29 December 1986 (age 39)	(Germany) SV Altlüdersdorf (2011)
11	Darrel Tan	(Singapore)	DF	13 September 1987 (age 39)	(Singapore) Hougang United (2011)
12	Madhu Mohana	(Singapore)	DF	6 March 1991 (age 35)	(Singapore) Courts Young Lions (2011)
Midfielders
4	Nawfal Shahib	(Singapore)	MF	16 October 1979 (age 47)	Free Transfer (2011)
7	Syed Karim	(Singapore)	MF	21 May 1984 (age 42)	(Singapore) SAFFC (2010)
8	Jalal	(Singapore)	MF	28 December 1980 (age 45)	(Singapore) Hougang United (2011)
10	Guntur Djafril	(Singapore)	MF	3 April 1985 (age 41)	(Singapore) SAFFC (2010)
14	Sazali Salleh (Captain)	(Singapore)	MF	18 January 1980 (age 46)	(Singapore) Hougang United (2010)
17	Shahri Musa	(Singapore)	MF	18 August 1984 (age 42)	Free Transfer (2007)
19	Han Yiguang	(Singapore)	MF	2 February 1985 (age 41)	(Singapore) Balestier Khalsa (2011)
20	Hyun Jong-Woon	(Singapore)	MF	31 October 1989 (age 37)	(Singapore) Tanjong Pagar United (2011)
Forwards
9	Goh Swee Swee	(Singapore)	FW	2 June 1986 (age 40)	(Singapore) Balestier Khalsa (2010)
16	Moon Soon-Ho	(South Korea)	FW	15 March 1981 (age 45)	(South Korea) Cheonan City FC (2011)

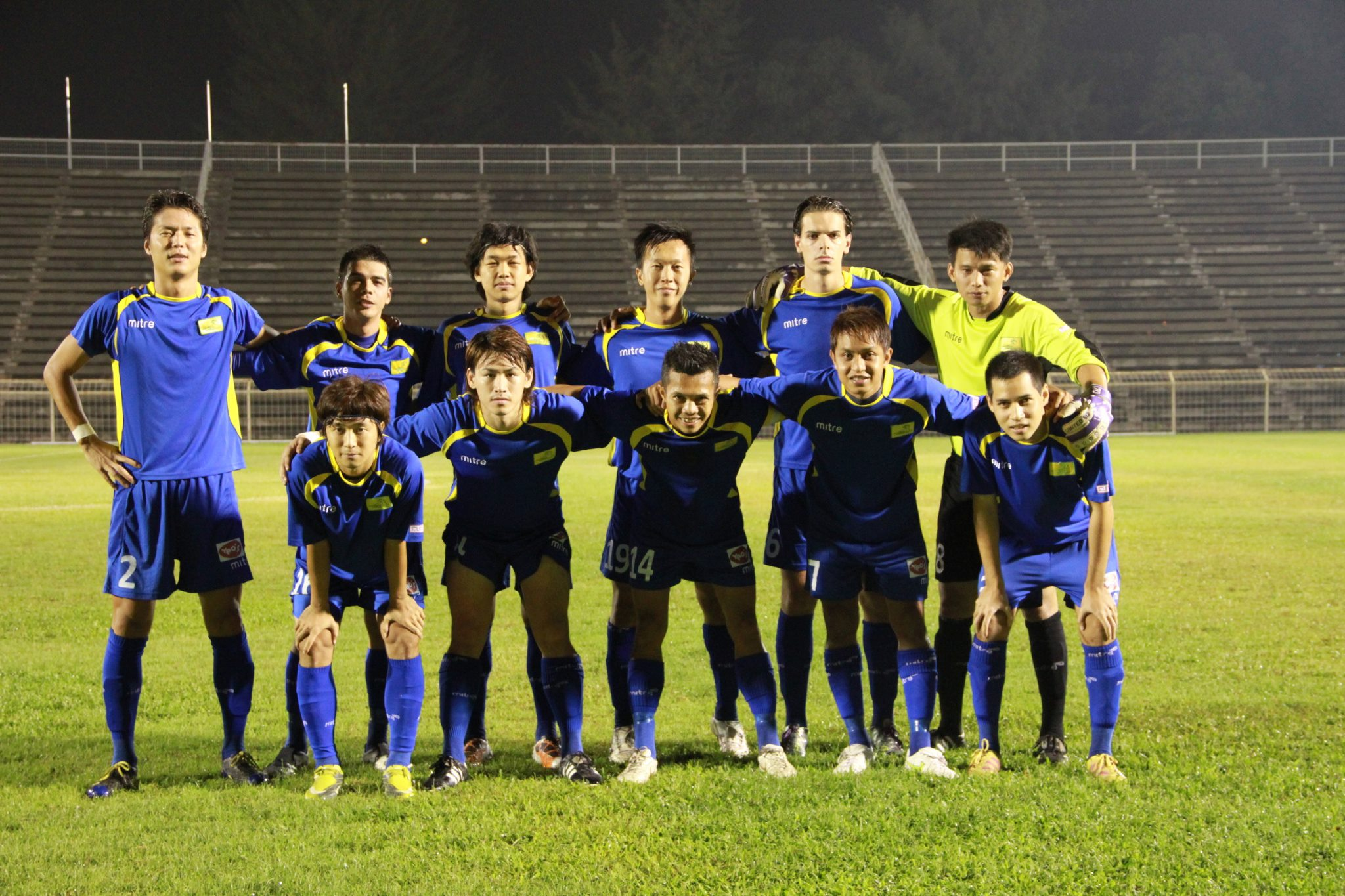
Woodlands Wellington 2011 Squad, pictured here in their blue away strip. Top (from left): Fumiya Kobayashi, Guntur Djafril, Hyun Jong-Woon, Han Yiguang, Munier Raychouni, Ang Bang Heng Bottom (from left): Moon Soon-Ho, Darrel Tan, Sazali Salleh, Syed Karim, Duncan Elias

== S.League ==
=== League table ===
Pos	Team	Pld	W	D	L	GF	GA	GD	Pts
8	Geylang United	33	13	2	18	43	63	−20	41
9	Young Lions	33	7	6	20	33	54	−21	27
10	Balestier Khalsa	33	7	5	21	28	63	−35	26
11	Tanjong Pagar United	33	3	5	25	21	77	−56	14
12	Woodlands Wellington	33	3	4	26	22	92	−70	13

Source: RSSSF
Rules for classification: 1) points; 2) goal difference; 3) number of goals scored; 4) number of wins

=== Overview ===
Round	1	2	3	4	5	6	7	8	9	10	11	12	13	14	15	16	17	18	19	20	21	22	23	24	25	26	27	28	29	30	31	32	33
Ground	A	H	A	A	A	H	H	H	A	H	H	A	A	H	H	A	H	A	A	H	H	A	H	A	A	H	H	A	H	A	A	A	H
Result	L	L	D	L	L	L	L	D	L	L	L	L	W	L	L	L	L	L	L	L	W	W	L	L	L	L	L	L	L	L	D	D	L

Source: Matches
A = Away; H = Home; W = Win; D = Draw; L = Loss

==== Matches ====
14 February 2011 1	Hougang United	1–0	Woodlands Wellington	Hougang Stadium
19:30 GMT+8	Carlos Alberto Delgado (yellow card) 65'; Mamadou Diallo 85'; Fadhil Salim (yellow card) 90'	Report	(yellow card) 4' Sazali Salleh; (yellow card) 15' Navin Neil Vanu; (yellow card) 51' Adrian Butters; (red card) 67' Graham Tatters; (yellow card) 70' Goh Swee Swee; (yellow card) 77' Ali Imran Lomri	Attendance: 1,547; Referee: Sukhbir Singh

21 February 2011 2	Woodlands Wellington	0–1	Albirex Niigata (S)	Woodlands Stadium
19:30 GMT+8	Navin Neil Vanu (yellow card) 31'; Sazali Salleh (yellow card) 40'; Madhu Mohana (yellow card) 55'; Sahairi Ramri (yellow card) 82'; Munier Raychouni (yellow card) 87'	Report	(yellow card) 41' Keisuke Matsui; 86' Bruno Castanheira	Attendance: 859; Referee: Johan Jahari

4 March 2011 3	Tanjong Pagar United	0–0	Woodlands Wellington	Jalan Besar Stadium
19:30 GMT+8	Nurizam Azman (yellow card) 45'; Kim Jong-oh (yellow card) 54'; Kim Seong-Kyu (yellow card) 73'	Report	(yellow card) 45' Shahri Musa; (yellow card) 57' Adrian Butters; (yellow card) 84' Sahairi Ramri	Attendance: 1,587; Referee: Muhd Taqi

8 March 2011 4	SAFFC	5–0	Woodlands Wellington	Choa Chu Kang Stadium
19:30 GMT+8	Shahri Musa (yellow card) 45'; Mislav Karoglan 54'; Mislav Karoglan 55'; Indra Sahdan 64'; Indra Sahdan (yellow card) 65'; Ivan Jerković 69'; Indra Sahdan 77'	Report	(yellow card) 22' Munier Raychouni; (yellow card) 41' Goh Swee Swee	Attendance: 1,789; Referee: Leow Thiam Hoe

27 March 2011 5	Home United	2–0	Woodlands Wellington	Bishan Stadium
19:30 GMT+8	Nor Azli Yusoff (yellow card) 21'; Qiu Li 24'; Frederic Mendy 56'; Rosman Sulaiman (yellow card) 79'; Frédéric Mendy (yellow card) 86'	Report	(yellow card) 45' Ali Imran Lomri; (yellow card) 48' Han Yiguang	Attendance: 1,505; Referee: Muhd Taqi

31 March 2011 6	Woodlands Wellington	1–2	Étoile FC	Woodlands Stadium
19:30 GMT+8	Sazali Salleh (yellow card) 42'; Leonardo Aleixa da Costa (yellow card) 59'; Graham Tatters (yellow card) 61'; Navin Neil Vanu 62'; Navin Neil Vanu (yellow card) 64'	Report	(yellow card) 65' Franklin Anzité; 86' Maxime Belouet; 90' Selim Kaabi; (yellow card) 90' Jonathan Toto	Attendance: 699; Referee: Leow Thiam Hoe

4 April 2011 7	Woodlands Wellington	1–2	Tampines Rovers	Woodlands Stadium
19:30 GMT+8	Sahairi Ramri 32'	Report	48' Seiji Kaneko; 51' Aliff Shafaein; 87' Aleksandar Đurić; (yellow card) 90' Ahmad Fahmie	Attendance: 658; Referee: Abas Daud

13 April 2011 8	Woodlands Wellington	2–2	Geylang United	Woodlands Stadium
19:30 GMT+8	Munier Raychouni (yellow card) 27'; Sazali Salleh (yellow card) 43' (pen) Graham Tatters 67'; Leonardo Aleixa da Costa 86'	Report	14' Kim Jae-Hong; (yellow card) 41' Shah Hirul Yusof; 89' Adrian Butters (og)	Attendance: 611; Referee: Sukhbir Singh

21 April 2011 9	Balestier Khalsa	2–0	Woodlands Wellington	Toa Payoh Stadium
19:30 GMT+8	Armanizam Dolah (yellow card) 54'; Kim Young-Kwang 70'; Vitor Borges de Souza 76'; Paul Cunningham (yellow card) 78'	Report	(yellow card) 29' Graham Tatters; (yellow card) 43' Han Yiguang	Attendance: 832; Referee: Johan Jahari

29 April 2011 10	Woodlands Wellington	0–1	Gombak United	Jalan Besar Stadium
19:30 GMT+8	Han Yiguang (yellow card) 19'; Shahri Musa (yellow card) 36'; Goh Swee Swee (yellow card) 45'; Darrel Tan (red card) 90'	Report	(red card) 57' Ruhaizad Ismail; 63' Jang Jo-Yoon	Attendance: 457; Referee: Sukhbir Singh

5 May 2011 11	Woodlands Wellington	1–4	Hougang United	Woodlands Stadium
19:30 GMT+8	Han Yiguang (yellow card) 6'; Ali Imran Lomri 73'; Munier Raychouni (yellow card) 81'; Graham Tatters (yellow card) 85'	Report	14' Diego Gama de Oliveira; 19' Diego Gama de Oliveira; (yellow card) 45' Jordan Webb; 63' Jordan Webb; 78' Jordan Webb	Attendance: 655; Referee: Abas Daud

10 May 2011 12	Albirex Niigata (S)	5–0	Woodlands Wellington	Jurong East Stadium
19:30 GMT+8	Shimpei Sakurada 41'; Tatsuro Inui 52'; Bruno Castanheira 56' (pen) Yosuke Saito 89'; Yosuke Saito 90'	Report	(yellow card) 53' Sahairi Ramri; (yellow card) 61' Ali Imran Lomri; (yellow card) 70' Sazali Salleh	Attendance: 1,137; Referee: Abdul Malik

14 May 2011 13	Courts Young Lions	1–2	Woodlands Wellington	Jalan Besar Stadium
19:30 GMT+8	Fazli Ayob 17'; Shakir Hamzah (red card) 52'; Eugene Luo (yellow card) 71'	Report	34' Goh Swee Swee; (yellow card) 42' Syed Karim; (yellow card) 60' Sahairi Ramri; 85' Leonardo Aleixa da Costa	Attendance: 509; Referee: K. Kalimuthu

17 May 2011 14	Woodlands Wellington	0–1	Tanjong Pagar United	Woodlands Stadium
19:30 GMT+8	Navin Neil Vanu (yellow card) 57'; Han Yiguang 65'; Darrel Tan (yellow card) 86'	Report	(yellow card) 14' Khairul Solyhin; 79' Takaya Kawanabe; (yellow card) 88' Patrick Paranjody; (yellow card) 90' Arisman Arman	Attendance: 753; Referee: Ahmad A'Qashah

26 May 2011 15	Woodlands Wellington	1–5	SAFFC	Woodlands Stadium
19:30 GMT+8	Goh Swee Swee 6'; Graham Tatters (red card) 37'	Report	18' Farhan Hairoddin (og); 38' Mislav Karoglan (pen); 43' Fazrul Nawaz; 45' Fazrul Nawaz; (yellow card) 55' Daniel Hammond; (yellow card) 58' Erwan Gunawan; 64' Fazrul Nawaz	Attendance: 681; Referee: Abas Daud

18 June 2011 16	Tampines Rovers	5–0	Woodlands Wellington	Tampines Stadium
19:30 GMT+8	Shahdan Sulaiman 22'; Shahdan Sulaiman 48'; Aleksandar Đurić 56'; Aleksandar Đurić 72'; Aleksandar Đurić 84'	Report	(yellow card) 41' Goh Swee Swee; (yellow card) 49' Moon Soon-Ho	Attendance: 1,106; Referee: Abdul Malik

22 June 2011 17	Woodlands Wellington	1–5	Home United	Woodlands Stadium
19:30 GMT+8	Han Yiguang (yellow card) 17'; Ali Imran Lomri (yellow card) 44' (pen) Moon Soon-Ho 53'; Madhu Mohana (yellow card) 60'; Darrel Tan (yellow card) 85'	Report	18' Kenji Arai; (yellow card) 25' Nor Azli Yusoff; (yellow card) 37' Zulfadli Zainal Abidin; (yellow card) 38' Shi Jiayi; (yellow card) 55' (red card) Nor Azli Yusoff; 61' Qiu Li (pen); 68' Frédéric Mendy; 70' Madhu Mohana (og); 90' Qiu Li	Attendance: 711; Referee: K. Kalimuthu

27 June 2011 18	Geylang United	1–0	Woodlands Wellington	Bedok Stadium
19:30 GMT+8	Adrian Dhanaraj (yellow card) 50'; Bong Jung-Hee 59'; Mubarak Ahamad (yellow card) 90'	Report	(yellow card) 34' Navin Neil Vanu; (yellow card) 90' Sahairi Ramri	Attendance: 779; Referee: Sukhbir Singh

2 July 2011 19	Étoile FC	3–0	Woodlands Wellington	Queenstown Stadium
19:30 GMT+8	Kamel Chaaouane 7'; Jonathan Toto 28'; Jonathan Toto 40'; Maxime Belouet (yellow card) 51'; Theo Raymond (yellow card) 54'; Jonathan Toto (yellow card) 71'	Report	(yellow card) 59' Guntur Djafril; (yellow card) 79' Jalal; (yellow card) 84' Goh Swee Swee	Attendance: 719; Referee: Muhd Taqi

7 July 2011 20	Woodlands Wellington	0–4	Courts Young Lions	Woodlands Stadium
19:30 GMT+8		Report	7' Khairul Nizam; (yellow card) 18' Hariss Harun; 30' Safuwan Baharudin; 35' Faris Ramli; 85' Syafiq Zainal; 88' Eugene Luo	Attendance: 591; Referee: Johan Jahari

10 July 2011 21	Woodlands Wellington	1–0	Balestier Khalsa	Woodlands Stadium
19:30 GMT+8	Guntur Djafril (yellow card) 37'; Guntur Djafril 47'	Report	(yellow card) 48' Ishak Zainol; (yellow card) 88' Lim Young-Woo	Attendance: 573; Referee: Abdul Malik

15 July 2011 22	Hougang United	2–3	Woodlands Wellington	Hougang Stadium
19:30 GMT+8	Sobrie Mazelan 40'; Jordan Webb (yellow card) 45'; Jordan Webb 69'	Report	(yellow card) 34' Han Yiguang; 57' Moon Soon-Ho; 76' Moon Soon-Ho; 94' Moon Soon-Ho	Attendance: 644; Referee: Abas Daud

8 August 2011 23	Woodlands Wellington	1–5	Albirex Niigata (S)	Woodlands Stadium
19:30 GMT+8	Moon Soon-Ho 1'; Nawfal Shahib (yellow card) 24'; Moon Soon-Ho (yellow card) 72'	Report	20' Norihiro Kawakami; 52' Shotaro Ihata; 53' Tatsuro Inui; 565' Bruno Castanheira; (yellow card) 72' Atsushi Shimono; (yellow card) 81' Shimpei Sakurada; 93' Shimpei Sakurada	Attendance: 756; Referee: Yazeen Buhari

12 August 2011 24	Gombak United	3–0	Woodlands Wellington	Jalan Besar Stadium
20:00 GMT+8	Bong Jung-Hee 20'; Park Kang-Jin (yellow card) 45'; Bong Jung-Hee 58'; Aikhena Obadin (yellow card) 77'; Ruhaizad Ismail 90'	Report	(yellow card) 40' Han Yiguang	Attendance: 807; Referee: Johan Jahari

11 September 2011 25	SAFFC	7–0	Woodlands Wellington	Jalan Besar Stadium
20:00 GMT+8	Fazrul Nawaz 2'; Taisuke Akiyoshi 18'; Taisuke Akiyoshi 27' (og) Darrel Tan 78'; Mislav Karoglan 82'; Indra Sahdan 83'; Mislav Karoglan 90'	Report	(yellow card) 12' Madhu Mohana	Attendance: 807; Referee: Johan Jahari

16 September 2011 26	Woodlands Wellington	0–4	Tampines Rovers	Jalan Besar Stadium
19:30 GMT+8	Han Yiguang (yellow card) 2'; Goh Swee Swee (yellow card) 26'; Ang Bang Heng (yellow card) 80'	Report	4' Aleksandar Đurić; 8' Benoit Croissant; 24' Aleksandar Đurić; 68' Aleksandar Đurić (pen)	Attendance: 399; Referee: Abas Daud

4 October 2011 27	Woodlands Wellington	0–2	Étoile FC	Woodlands Stadium
19:30 GMT+8	Madhu Mohana (yellow card) 26'; Munier Raychouni (yellow card) 34'; Goh Swee Swee (yellow card) 63'; Jalal (yellow card) 58'; Sazali Salleh (yellow card) 63'	Report	(yellow card) 38' Sirina Camara; 38' Julien Durand; (yellow card) 57' Antonin Trilles; 76' Kamel Chaaouane; (yellow card) 79' Selim Kaabi; (yellow card) 85' Jean Blanpin	Attendance: 275; Referee: Abdul Malik

15 October 2011 28	Courts Young Lions	5–1	Woodlands Wellington	Jalan Besar Stadium
19:30 GMT+8	Gabriel Quak 31'; Sheikh Abdul Hadi (yellow card) 32'; Irwan Shah 50'; Navin Neil Vanu (yellow card) 65'; Afiq Yunos (yellow card) 66'; Faris Ramli 68'; Hariss Harun 75'; Navin Neil Vanu 80'; Shahdan Sulaiman (yellow card) 90'	Report	37' Moon Soon-Ho; (yellow card) 41' Han Yiguang; (yellow card) 90' Ang Bang Heng	Attendance: 344; Referee: Muhd Taqi

18 October 2011 29	Woodlands Wellington	1–2	Geylang United	Woodlands Stadium
19:30 GMT+8	Jalal 7'; Sazali Salleh (yellow card) 30'; Jalal (yellow card) 39'; Hyun Jong-Woon (yellow card) 37'	Report	8' Shah Hirul Yusof; (yellow card) 26' Sevki Sha'ban; 32' Yuta Nakano; (yellow card) 36' Mubarak Ahamad; (yellow card) 63' Syed Fadhil; (yellow card) 68' Hassan Aziz; (yellow card) 83' Hafiz Rahim; (yellow card) 90' Syed Thaha; (yellow card) 90' Khalili D'Cruz	Attendance: 244; Referee: Johan Jahari

24 October 2011 30	Home United	2–1	Woodlands Wellington	Bishan Stadium
19:30 GMT+8	Masrezwan Masturi 30'; Frédéric Mendy 74'	Report	(yellow card) 28' Munier Raychouni; (yellow card) 62' Madhu Mohana; 65' Goh Swee Swee; (yellow card) 84' Madhu Mohana	Attendance: 721; Referee: Abas Daud

31 October 2011 31	Balestier Khalsa	2–2	Woodlands Wellington	Toa Payoh Stadium
19:30 GMT+8	Ishak Zainol (yellow card) 21'; Ishak Zainol 27'; K. Vikraman 34'; Hilmi Azman (yellow card) 37'; Ridhwan Osman (yellow card) 87'	Report	(yellow card) 56' Madhu Mohana; 56' Goh Swee Swee; (yellow card) 57' Syed Karim; 74' Moon Soon-Ho	Attendance: 630; Referee: W. Ravisanthiran

3 November 2011 32	Tanjong Pagar United	1–1	Woodlands Wellington	Clementi Stadium
19:30 GMT+8	Patrick Paranjody 82'	Report	87' Moon Soon-Ho	Attendance: 425; Referee: Muhd Taqi

28 November 2011 33	Woodlands Wellington	2–4	Gombak United	Woodlands Stadium
19:30 GMT+8	Goh Swee Swee (yellow card) 23'; Hyun Jong-Woon 52'; Goh Swee Swee 76'; Sazali Salleh (yellow card) 87'	Report	8' Jang Jo-Yoon; 45' Jang Jo-Yoon; (yellow card) 75' Walid Lounis; 83' Park Kang-Jin; 90' Tengku Mushadad (pen)	Attendance: 299; Referee: Ahmad A'Qashah

== RHB Singapore Cup ==
=== First round ===
14 June 2011 First Round	Home United	5–1	Woodlands Wellington	Bishan Stadium
19:30 GMT+8	Firdaus Idros 27'; Kenji Arai 40'; Asraf Abdul Rashid 66' (pen) Qiu Li 80'; Qiu Li 86'	Report	67' Adrian Butters; (yellow card) 79' Han Yiguang	Attendance: 1,222; Referee: W. Ravisanthiran

== Singapore League Cup ==
=== First round ===
19 July 2011 First Round	Woodlands Wellington	0–2	Hougang United	Woodlands Stadium
19:30 GMT+8	Sazali Salleh (yellow card) 27'; Guntur Djafril (yellow card) 50'; Sahairi Ramri (yellow card) 84'	Report	21' Fazli Jaffar; (yellow card) 60' Fathi Yunus; 73' Vitor Borges de Souza; (yellow card) 74' Vitor Borges de Souza; (yellow card) 78' (red card) Vitor Borges de Souza	Attendance: 911; Referee: K. Kalimuthu

== Appearances and goals ==
No.	Pos	Nat	Player	Total		S-League		RHB Singapore Cup		Singapore League Cup	
No.	Pos	Nat	Player	Apps	Goals	Apps	Goals	Apps	Goals	Apps	Goals
1	GK	(Singapore) SGP	Amos Boon**	11	0	11+0	0	0+0	0	0+0	0
1	GK	(Singapore) SGP	Phang Chin Guan	4	0	4+0	0	0+0	0	0+0	0
18	GK	(Singapore) SGP	Ang Bang Heng	21	0	18+1	0	1+0	0	1+0	0
2	DF	(Guyana) GUY	Adrian Butters**	11	1	10+0	0	1+0	1	0+0	0
2	DF	(Japan) JPN	Fumiya Kobayashi	15	0	13+0	0	1+0	0	1+0	0
3	DF	(Singapore) SGP	Duncan David Elias	16	0	14+1	0	0+0	0	1+0	0
5	DF	(Singapore) SGP	Sahairi Ramri	21	1	15+4	1	1+0	0	0+1	0
6	DF	(Lebanon) LBN	Munier Raychouni	33	0	31+0	0	1+0	0	1+0	0
11	DF	(Singapore) SGP	Darrel Tan	16	0	3+12	0	0+0	0	0+1	0
12	DF	(Singapore) SGP	Madhu Mohana	28	0	26+1	0	0+0	0	0+1	0
16	DF	(Scotland) SCO	Graham Tatters**	14	1	13+0	1	0+0	0	0+1	0
25	DF	(Singapore) SGP	Shazlee Hamzah***	4	0	2+1	0	0+0	0	1+0	0
27	DF	(Singapore) SGP	Farhan Zakaria***	2	0	2+0	0	0+0	0	0+0	0
40	DF	(Singapore) SGP	Zulkarnain Malik***	1	0	1+0	0	0+0	0	0+0	0
4	MF	(Singapore) SGP	Nawfal Shahib	13	0	4+9	0	0+0	0	0+0	0
7	MF	(Singapore) SGP	Syed Karim	19	0	10+9	0	0+0	0	0+0	0
8	MF	(Singapore) SGP	Jalal	32	1	28+2	1	1+0	0	1+0	0
10	MF	(Singapore) SGP	Guntur Djafril	12	1	10+1	1	0+0	0	1+0	0
13	MF	(Singapore) SGP	Ali Imran Lomri**	16	1	11+4	1	1+0	0	0+0	0
14	MF	(Singapore) SGP	Sazali Salleh	30	0	26+2	0	1+0	0	1+0	0
17	MF	(Singapore) SGP	Shahri Musa	11	0	10+1	0	0+0	0	0+0	0
19	MF	(Singapore) SGP	Han Yiguang	26	0	22+2	0	1+0	0	1+0	0
20	MF	(South Korea) KOR	Hyun Jong-Woon	17	1	16+0	1	0+0	0	1+0	0
21	MF	(Singapore) SGP	Oswind Suriya Rosayro***	2	0	0+2	0	0+0	0	0+0	0
31	MF	(Singapore) SGP	Farhan Hairoddin***	6	0	2+3	0	1+0	0	0+0	0
36	MF	(Singapore) SGP	Sahhid Jamallil***	4	0	0+4	0	0+0	0	0+0	0
9	FW	(Singapore) SGP	Goh Swee Swee	31	5	21+9	5	1+0	0	0+0	0
16	FW	(South Korea) KOR	Moon Soon-Ho	18	8	14+3	8	0+0	0	1+0	0
15	FW	(Brazil) BRA	Leonardo Aleixa da Costa**	15	2	12+2	2	1+0	0	0+0	0
37	FW	(Singapore) SGP	Navin Neil Vanu**	18	1	12+6	1	0+0	0	0+0	0

Last updated: 20 June 2012
Source: Match reports in Competitive matches

** Amos Boon, Adrian Butters, Graham Tatters and Leonardo Aleixa da Costa were released from the club during the mid-season window.
** Ali Imran Lomri was transferred to Singapore Recreation Club during the mid-season window.
** Navin Neil Vanu was transferred to Courts Young Lions during the mid-season window.
*** Denotes Prime League players

=== Goalscoring statistics ===
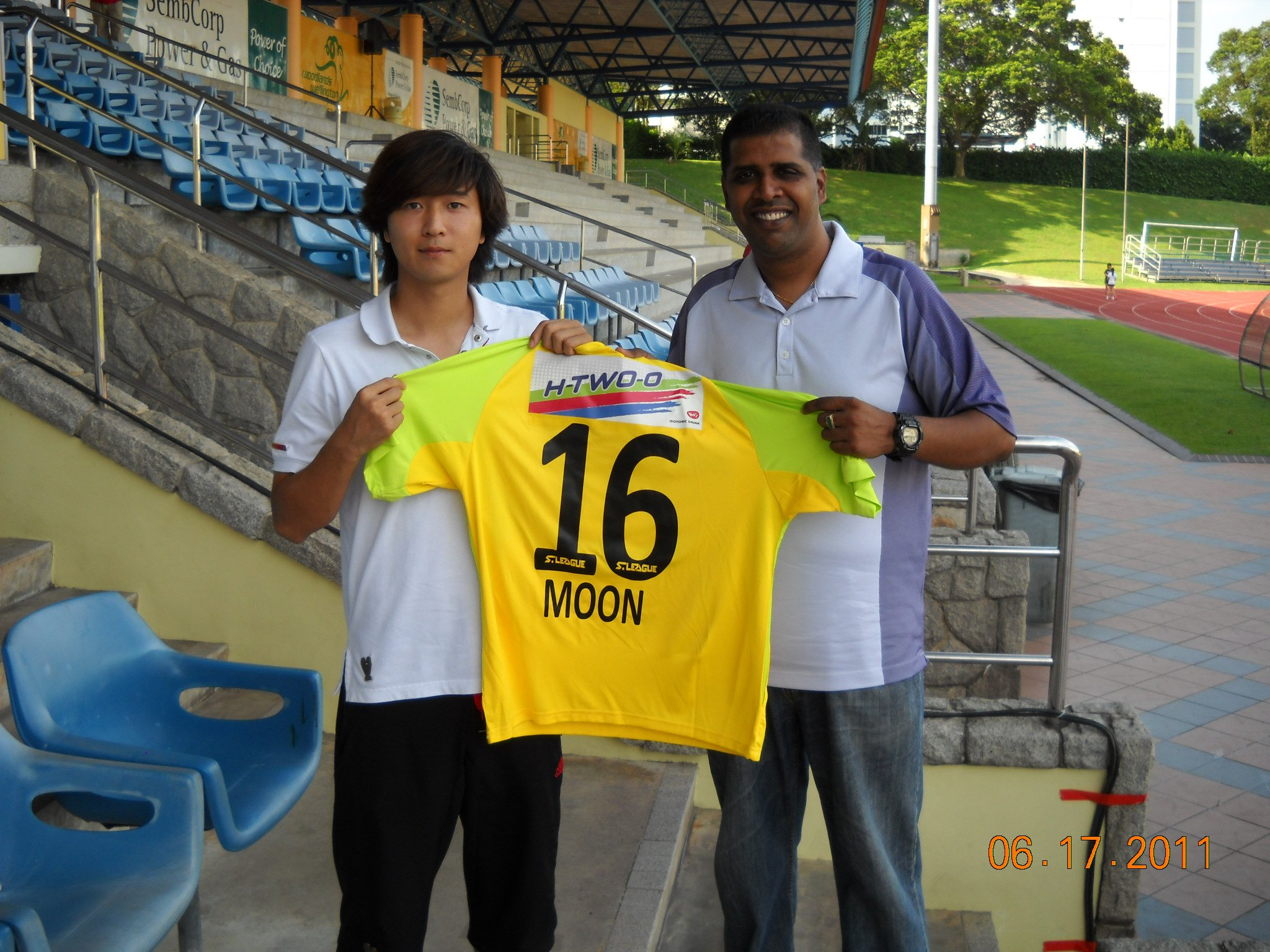
Woodlands head coach, R. Balasubramaniam, with top scorer Moon Soon-Ho during the latter's transfer to the Rams in June 2011.

Includes all competitive matches. The list is sorted by shirt number when total goals are equal.

Ran	No.	Pos	Nat	Name	S-League	RHB Singapore Cup	2011 Singapore League Cup	Total
1	16	FW	(South Korea)	Moon Soon-Ho	8	0	0	8
2	9	FW	(Singapore)	Goh Swee Swee	5	0	0	5
3	9	FW	(Brazil)	Leo Costa**	2	0	0	2
4	2	DF	(Guyana)	Adrian Butters**	0	1	0	1
5	5	DF	(Singapore)	Sahairi Ramri	1	0	0	1
5	16	DF	(Scotland)	Graham Tatters**	1	0	0	1
5	8	MF	(Singapore)	Jalal	1	0	0	1
5	10	MF	(Singapore)	Guntur Djafril	1	0	0	1
5	13	MF	(Singapore)	Ali Imran Lomri**	1	0	0	1
5	20	MF	(South Korea)	Hyun Jong-Woon	1	0	0	1
5	37	FW	(Singapore)	Navin Neil Vanu**	1	0	0	1
				TOTALS	22	1	0	23

Last updated: 21 June 2012
Source: Match reports in Competitive matches

** Adrian Butters, Graham Tatters and Leonardo Aleixa da Costa were released from the club during the mid-season window.
** Ali Imran Lomri was transferred to Singapore Recreation Club during the mid-season window.
** Navin Neil Vanu was transferred to Courts Young Lions during the mid-season window.

== Disciplinary record ==
Includes all competitive matches. The list is sorted by shirt number when total cards are equal.

R	No.	Pos	Nat	Name	S-League			RHB Singapore Cup			Singapore League Cup			Total		
R	No.	Pos	Nat	Name	Yellow card	(yellow card) (yellow-red card)	Red card	Yellow card	(yellow card) (yellow-red card)	Red card	Yellow card	(yellow card) (yellow-red card)	Red card	Yellow card	(yellow card) (yellow-red card)	Red card
1	16	DF	(Scotland)	Graham Tatters**	3	0	2	0	0	0	0	0	0	3	0	2
2	11	DF	(Singapore)	Darrel Tan	2	0	1	0	0	0	0	0	0	2	0	1
3	19	MF	(Singapore)	Han Yiguang	11	0	0	1	0	0	0	0	0	12	0	0
4	8	MF	(Singapore)	Sazali Salleh	8	0	0	0	0	0	1	0	0	9	0	0
5	9	FW	(Singapore)	Goh Swee Swee	8	0	0	0	0	0	0	0	0	8	0	0
6	5	DF	(Singapore)	Sahairi Ramri	5	0	0	0	0	0	1	0	0	6	0	0
6	6	DF	(Lebanon)	Munier Raychouni	6	0	0	0	0	0	0	0	0	6	0	0
6	12	DF	(Singapore)	Madhu Mohana	6	0	0	0	0	0	0	0	0	6	0	0
6	37	FW	(Singapore)	Navin Neil Vanu**	6	0	0	0	0	0	0	0	0	6	0	0
7	13	MF	(Singapore)	Ali Imran Lomri**	4	0	0	0	0	0	0	0	0	4	0	0
8	8	MF	(Singapore)	Jalal	3	0	0	0	0	0	0	0	0	3	0	0
8	10	MF	(Singapore)	Guntur Djafril	2	0	0	0	0	0	1	0	0	3	0	0
9	2	DF	(Guyana)	Adrian Butters**	2	0	0	0	0	0	0	0	0	2	0	0
9	4	MF	(Singapore)	Syed Karim	2	0	0	0	0	0	0	0	0	2	0	0
9	16	FW	(South Korea)	Moon Soon-Ho	2	0	0	0	0	0	0	0	0	2	0	0
9	17	MF	(Singapore)	Shahri Musa	2	0	0	0	0	0	0	0	0	2	0	0
9	18	GK	(Singapore)	Ang Bang Heng	2	0	0	0	0	0	0	0	0	2	0	0
10	2	DF	(Japan)	Fumiya Kobayashi	1	0	0	0	0	0	0	0	0	1	0	0
10	4	MF	(Singapore)	Nawfal Shahib	1	0	0	0	0	0	0	0	0	1	0	0
10	15	FW	(Brazil)	Leo Costa**	1	0	0	0	0	0	0	0	0	1	0	0
10	20	MF	(South Korea)	Hyun Jong-Woon	1	0	0	0	0	0	0	0	0	1	0	0
				TOTALS	75	0	3	1	0	0	3	0	0	79	0	3

Last updated: 22 June 2012
Source: Match reports in Competitive matches

** Adrian Butters, Graham Tatters and Leonardo Aleixa da Costa were released from the club during the mid-season window.
** Ali Imran Lomri was transferred to Singapore Recreation Club during the mid-season window.
** Navin Neil Vanu was transferred to Courts Young Lions during the mid-season window.
