= 2010 Woodlands Wellington FC season =

Woodlands Wellington
2010 season
- Chairman: (Singapore) Jayadev Unnithan, PBM
- Coach: (Singapore) A. Shasi Kumar (Head Coach) (Singapore) Hasrin Jailani (Player-Assistant Coach)
- S-League: 12th
- RHB Singapore Cup: 1st round
- Singapore League Cup: Runners-up
- Top goalscorer: League: (Morocco) Abdelhadi Laakkad (8); All: (Morocco) Abdelhadi Laakkad (9)
Home colours	Away colours

The 2010 season was Woodlands Wellington's 15th competitive and consecutive season in the top flight of Singapore football and 23rd year in existence as a football club.

== Transfers ==
=== In ===
==== Pre-season ====
Position	Player	Transferred From	Date	Source
GK	(Singapore) Fajar Sarib	(Singapore) Geylang United	1 January 2010	
GK	(Singapore) Hafez Mawasi	(Singapore) Balestier Khalsa	1 January 2010	
DF	(Singapore) Winston Yap	(Singapore) Sengkang Punggol	1 January 2010	
DF	(Japan) Kazuki Yoshino	(Singapore) Albirex Niigata (S)	1 January 2010	
DF	(Singapore) Sahairi Ramri	(Singapore) Balestier Khalsa	1 January 2010	
MF	(Singapore) Syed Karim	(Singapore) SAFFC	1 January 2010	
MF	(Singapore) Mohd Noor Ali	(Singapore) Geylang United	1 January 2010	
MF	(Singapore) Guntur Djafril	(Singapore) SAFFC	1 January 2010	
MF	(Singapore) Sazali Salleh	(Singapore) Sengkang Punggol	1 January 2010	
FW	(Morocco) Laakkad Abdelhadi	Free Transfer	1 January 2010	
FW	(Singapore) Rizawan Abdullah	(Singapore) Balestier Khalsa	1 January 2010	
MF	(Morocco) Rachid Lajane	(Morocco) Raja Al Hoceima	26 February 2010	

=== Out ===
==== Pre-season ====
Position	Player	Transferred To	Date	Source
GK	(Singapore) Rezal Hassan	(Singapore) SAFFC	1 January 2010	
GK	(Singapore) Ahmadulhaq Che Omar	(Singapore) Balestier Khalsa	1 January 2010	
DF	(Singapore) Precious Emuejeraye	(Indonesia) Sriwijaya FC	1 January 2010	
DF	(Singapore) Syaiful Iskandar	(Singapore) SAFFC	1 January 2010	
DF	(England) Daniel Hammond	(Singapore) SAFFC	1 January 2010	
MF	(Singapore) Jamil Ali	(Singapore) Tampines Rovers	1 January 2010	
MF	(Singapore) Jalal	(Singapore) Sengkang Punggol	1 January 2010	
MF	(Singapore) Kamal Nasir	(Singapore) Balestier Khalsa	1 January 2010	
MF	(Singapore) Ismadi Mukthar	(Singapore) Tampines Rovers	1 January 2010	
FW	(Iran) Mojtaba Tehranizadeh	(Singapore) Sengkang Punggol	1 January 2010	
FW	(Egypt) Zakaria Yusif	Released	1 January 2010	
MF	(Singapore) Hasrin Jailani	Retirement / Sengkang Punggol Assistant Coach	1 January 2010	
MF	(Singapore) J. Kalaiselvan	Released	1 January 2010	
FW	(Singapore) Zulfadhli Emran	(Singapore) Gombak United	1 January 2010	

== Squads ==
=== First team squad ===
No.	Name	Nationality	Position (s)	Date of Birth (Age)	Signed from (Year Signed)
Goalkeepers
1	Fajar Sarib	(Singapore)	GK	4 August 1977 (age 49)	(Singapore) Geylang United (2010)
18	Hafez Mawasi	(Singapore)	GK	31 March 1983 (age 43)	(Singapore) Balestier Khalsa (2010)
Defenders
2	Winston Yap	(Singapore)	DF	30 October 1976 (age 50)	(Singapore) Sengkang Punggol (2010)
4	Kazuki Yoshino	(Japan)	DF	23 January 1985 (age 41)	(Singapore) Albirex Niigata (S) (2010)
5	Sahairi Ramri	(Singapore)	DF	21 January 1987 (age 39)	(Singapore) Balestier Khalsa (2010)
6	Anaz Abdul Hadee	(Singapore)	DF	24 September 1983 (age 43)	(Singapore) SAFFC (2006)
10	Luis Eduardo Hicks	(Chile)	DF	27 November 1977 (age 48)	(Singapore) Sengkang Punggol (2009)
Midfielders
3	Azlan Alipah	(Singapore)	MF	12 July 1977 (age 49)	(Singapore) Tampines Rovers (2006)
7	Syed Karim	(Singapore)	MF	21 May 1984 (age 42)	(Singapore) SAFFC (2010)
8	Shahri Musa	(Singapore)	MF	18 August 1984 (age 42)	Free Transfer (2007)
11	Mohd Noor Ali (Captain)	(Singapore)	MF	16 May 1975 (age 51)	(Singapore) Geylang United (2010)
12	Asraf Rashid	(Singapore)	MF	27 August 1985 (age 41)	(Singapore) SAFFC (2009)
13	Guntur Djafril	(Singapore)	MF	3 April 1985 (age 41)	(Singapore) SAFFC (2010)
14	Sazali Salleh	(Singapore)	MF	18 January 1980 (age 46)	(Singapore) Sengkang Punggol (2010)
17	Rachid Lajane	(Morocco)	MF	2 February 1985 (age 41)	Free Transfer (2011)
Forwards
9	Laakkad Abdelhadi	(Morocco)	FW	27 April 1977 (age 49)	Free Transfer (2010)
19	Rizawan Abdullah	(Singapore)	FW	8 April 1987 (age 39)	(Singapore) Balestier Khalsa (2010)
36	Navin Neil Vanu	(Singapore)	FW	11 August 1989 (age 37)	(Singapore) Geylang United (2010)

== Final standings ==
Pos	Team	Pld	W	D	L	GF	GA	GD	Pts
8	Balestier Khalsa	33	10	7	16	26	40	−14	37
9	Young Lions	33	9	12	12	37	45	−8	34 (Note: Beijing Guoan Talent and Young Lions were deducted five points each for gross misconduct in their match on 7 September 2010.)
10	Beijing Guoan Talent	33	10	6	17	30	49	−19	31
11	Sengkang Punggol	33	7	6	20	24	48	−24	27
12	Woodlands Wellington	33	4	7	22	18	60	−42	19

Source: RSSSF
Rules for classification: 1) points; 2) goal difference; 3) number of goals scored; 4) number of wins

=== Overview ===
Round	1	2	3	4	5	6	7	8	9	10	11	12	13	14	15	16	17	18	19	20	21	22	23	24	25	26	27	28	29	30	31	32	33
Ground	A	H	A	H	H	H	A	A	H	H	A	A	H	H	A	A	H	A	H	A	H	A	A	H	H	H	H	A	H	A	H	A	A
Result	D	D	L	L	D	L	W	L	W	L	L	L	D	L	W	L	D	L	L	L	L	D	L	L	L	L	L	W	L	D	L	L	L

Source: Matches
A = Away; H = Home; W = Win; D = Draw; L = Loss

==== Matches ====
1 February 2010 1	Courts Young Lions	2–2	Woodlands Wellington	Jalan Besar Stadium
19:45 GMT+8	Fadhil Noh (yellow card) 19'; Kim Seong-Kyu (yellow card) 37'; Khairul Nizam 81'; Abdil Qaiyyim Mutalib 89'; Afiq Yunos 90'	Report	7' Winston Yap; 21' Laakkad Abdelhadi; (yellow card) 36' Winston Yap; (yellow card) 58' Kazuki Yoshino; (yellow card) 83' Luis Eduardo Hicks	Attendance: 2,471; Referee: Leow Thiam Hoe

18 February 2010 2	Woodlands Wellington	0–0	Beijing Guoan Talent	Woodlands Stadium
19:45 GMT+8	azali Salleh (yellow card) 88'	Report	(yellow card) 90' Liu Teng	Attendance: 1,420; Referee: W Ravisanthiran

11 March 2010 3	Étoile FC	4–0	Woodlands Wellington	Queenstown Stadium
19:45 GMT+8	Julien Deletraz 9'; Cyril Bagnost 14'; Frederic Mendy 21'; Frederic Mendy 51'; Karim Boudjema (yellow card) 52'; Cyril Bagnost (yellow card) 59'; Loic Leclercq (yellow card) 71'	Report	(yellow card) 23' Azlan Alipah; (yellow card) 29' Rizawan Abdullah; (yellow card) 30' Luis Eduardo Hicks; (yellow card) 43' Winston Yap; (yellow card) 51' Kazuki Yoshino; (yellow card) 58' Mohd Noor Ali; (yellow card) 72' Laakkad Abdelhadi; (yellow card) 83' Anaz Abdul Hadee; (yellow card) 90' Navin Neil Vanu	Attendance: 3,206; Referee: Sukhbir Singh

18 March 2010 4	Woodlands Wellington	0–1	Sengkang Punggol	Woodlands Stadium
19:45 GMT+8	Asraf Rashid (yellow card) 13'; Rizawan Abdullah (yellow card) 35'; Rachid Lajane (yellow card) 42'; Luis Eduardo Hicks (yellow card) 77'	Report	4' Jordan Webb; (yellow card) 7' Nor Azli Yusoff; (yellow card) 20' Shahir Hamzah; (yellow card) 24' Mamadou Diallo; (yellow card) 37' (red card) Nor Azli Yusoff; (yellow card) 73' Murphy Wiredu	Attendance: 1,392; Referee: P. Pandian

22 March 2010 5	Woodlands Wellington	2–2	Home United	Woodlands Stadium
19:45 GMT+8	Luis Eduardo Hicks (yellow card) 20'; Mohd Noor Ali (yellow card) 28'; Sazali Salleh (yellow card) 43'; Laakkad Abdelhadi 73'; Kazuki Yoshino 89'; Shahri Musa (yellow card) 90'	Report	15' Nelson San Martin; (yellow card) 22' Juma'at Jantan; (yellow card) 41' Isa Halim; 47' Choi Chul-Woo; (yellow card) 86' Rosman Sulaiman; (yellow card) 88' Naufal Omar Ashibie; (yellow card) 90' Ridhwan Osman	Attendance: 1,941; Referee: Abdul Malik

31 March 2010 6	Woodlands Wellington	0–4	Tampines Rovers	Jalan Besar Stadium
19:45 GMT+8	Sazali Salleh (yellow card) 27'	Report	11' Aleksandar Đurić; (yellow card) 48' Zulkarnaen Zainal; 56' Qiu Li; (yellow card) 74' Imran Sahib; 76' Khairul Amri; 87' Khairul Amri	Attendance: 1,317; Referee: Zaid Hussein

5 April 2010 7	Balestier Khalsa	0–1	Woodlands Wellington	Toa Payoh Stadium
19:45 GMT+8	K. Sathiaraj (yellow card) 28'; Kamal Nasir (yellow card) 82'	Report	(yellow card) 7' Laakkad Abdelhadi; (yellow card) 13' Azlan Alipah; 34' Laakkad Abdelhadi	Attendance: 994; Referee: Abas Daud

10 April 2010 8	Geylang United	1–0	Woodlands Wellington	Bedok Stadium
19:45 GMT+8	Syed Thaha (yellow card) 9'; Hafiz Rahim 45'; Rastislav Belicak (yellow card) 80'; Aliff Azmi (yellow card) 90'	Report		Attendance: 1,408; Referee: Muhd Taqi

16 April 2010 9	Woodlands Wellington	2–1	Gombak United	Jalan Besar Stadium
19:30 GMT+8	Rachid Lajane (yellow card) 18'; Laakkad Abdelhadi 26'; Mohd Noor Ali 32'; Syed Karim (yellow card) 45'; Kazuki Yoshino (yellow card) 86'	Report	12' Fazli Jaffar; (yellow card) 31' Park Kang-Jin	Attendance: 1,310; Referee: K. Kalimuthu

26 April 2010 10	Woodlands Wellington	1–2	Albirex Niigata (S)	Woodlands Stadium
19:45 GMT+8	Laakkad Abdelhadi 41'; Sazali Salleh (yellow card) 60'; Luis Eduardo Hicks (yellow card) 79'	Report	(yellow card) 45' Fumiya Kobayashi; 81' Shota Matsuoka; 84' Tatsuro Inui	Attendance: 1,235; Referee: Abas Daud

29 April 2010 11	Beijing Guoan Talent	2–1	Woodlands Wellington	Woodlands Stadium
19:45 GMT+8	Zhao Yang (yellow card) 58'; Tan Tiancheng 64'; Ma Chongchong 66'; Ma Chongchong (yellow card) 90'	Report	25' Laakkad Abdelhadi (pen); (yellow card) 56' Luis Eduardo Hicks	Attendance: 874; Referee: K. Kalimuthu

3 May 2010 12	SAFFC	3–1	Woodlands Wellington	Choa Chu Kang Stadium
19:45 GMT+8	Niklas Sandberg (yellow card) 27' (pen) Eduardo Federico Martinez 30'; John Wilkinson (yellow card) 40'; John Wilkinson 48' (og) Luis Eduardo Hicks 64'; Daniel Bennett (yellow card) 90'	Report	(red card) Mohd Noor Ali; (yellow card) 56' Kazuki Yoshino; (yellow card) 82' Sahairi Ramri; 90' Kazuki Yoshino	Attendance: 2,050; Referee: Adzhar Adziz

6 May 2010 13	Woodlands Wellington	1–1	Courts Young Lions	Woodlands Stadium
19:45 GMT+8	Syed Karim 85'	Report	90' Khairul Nizam	Attendance: 1,270; Referee: Johan Jahari

18 May 2010 14	Woodlands Wellington	0–2	Étoile FC	Woodlands Stadium
19:45 GMT+8	Kazuki Yoshino (yellow card) 16'	Report	18' Matthias Verschave (pen); (yellow card) 22' Mansour Lakehal; (yellow card) 35' Cyril Bagnost; 45' Kevin Yann; (yellow card) 88' Yohann Lacroix	Attendance: 1,259; Referee: Muhq Taqi

5 June 2010 15	Sengkang Punggol	0–1	Woodlands Wellington	Hougang Stadium
19:45 GMT+8	Faizal Amir (yellow card) 16'; Farizal Basri (yellow card) 41'; Fadhil Salim (yellow card) 55'; Nor Azli Yusoff (yellow card) 66'	Report	36' Kazuki Yoshino (pen); (yellow card) 43' Guntur Djafril; (yellow card) 62' Sahairi Ramri; (yellow card) 71' Asraf Rashid; (yellow card) 78' Luis Eduardo Hicks	Attendance: 965; Referee: Adzhar Adziz

8 June 2010 16	Home United	2–0	Woodlands Wellington	Clementi Stadium
19:45 GMT+8	Shi Jiayi 34'; Isa Halim (yellow card) 41'; Sufian Anuar 85'; Rosman Sulaiman (yellow card) 90'	Report	(yellow card) 47' Navin Neil Vanu	Attendance: 1,249; Referee: Zaid Hussein

13 June 2010 17	Woodlands Wellington	0–0	Geylang United	Woodlands Stadium
19:45 GMT+8	Sahairi Ramri (yellow card) 27'; Mohd Noor Ali (yellow card) 72'	Report	(yellow card) 74' Masrezwan Masturi	Attendance: 1,013; Referee: Muhq Taqi

21 June 2010 18	Tampines Rovers	5–0	Woodlands Wellington	Tampines Stadium
19:45 GMT+8	Aleksandar Đurić 5'; Qiu Li 34'; Benoit Croissant 55'; Qiu Li 60'; Khairul Amri 61'; Ismadi Mukhtar (yellow card) 72'; Shukor Zailan (yellow card) 76'	Report	(yellow card) 32' Navin Neil Vanu; (yellow card) 58' Asraf Rashid; (yellow card) 84' Sazali Salleh	Attendance: 1,091; Referee: Leow Thiam Hoe

26 June 2010 19	Woodlands Wellington	1–2	Balestier Khalsa	Woodlands Stadium
19:45 GMT+8	Shahri Musa 33'; Kazuki Yoshino (red card) 64'	Report	(yellow card) 35' Anantha Rajan; (yellow card) 65' Rivaldo Costa; 67' Paul Cunningham; 71' Rivaldo Costa; (yellow card) 90' Nurhilmi Jasni	Attendance: 1,230; Referee: Zaid Hussein

1 July 2010 20	Gombak United	5–0	Woodlands Wellington	Jurong West Stadium
19:45 GMT+8	Eddoh Pascal 25'; Hamqaamal Shah (yellow card) 56'; Eddoh Pascal 58'; Agu Casmir 61'; Fazrul Nawaz 68'; Zulkiffli Hassim 75'	Report	(yellow card) 47' Azli Mahmud; (yellow card) 85' Sazali Salleh	Attendance: 1,775; Referee: Johan Jahari

7 July 2010 21	Woodlands Wellington	0–4	SAFFC	Woodlands Stadium
19:45 GMT+8	Sazali Salleh (yellow card) 40'; Andy Ahmad (yellow card) 45'; Navin Neil Vanu (yellow card) 74'	Report	13' Park Tae-Won; 32' Hafiz Osman; 43' Indra Sahdan; 76' Park Tae-Won	Attendance: 836; Referee: Leow Thiam Hoe

15 July 2010 22	Albirex Niigata (S)	0–0	Woodlands Wellington	Jurong East Stadium
19:45 GMT+8	Atsushi Shimono (yellow card) 25'	Report	(yellow card) 61' Rachid Lajane; (yellow card) 66' Kazuki Yoshino; (yellow card) 87' Rizawan Abdullah	Attendance: 1,424; Referee: W. Ravisanthiran

19 July 2010 23	Courts Young Lions	1–0	Woodlands Wellington	Jalan Besar Stadium
19:45 GMT+8	Shafiq Ghani 2'; Irwan Shah (yellow card) 32'; Hariss Harun (yellow card) 46'	Report	(yellow card) 7' Azlan Alipah; (yellow card) 90' Navin Neil Vanu	Attendance: 1,531; Referee: Zaid Hussein

25 July 2010 24	Woodlands Wellington	0–1	Beijing Guoan Talent	Woodlands Stadium
19:45 GMT+8	Luis Eduardo Hicks (yellow card) 25'	Report	22' Zhang Ye; (red card) 45' Liu Teng; (yellow card) 75' Zhang Xiaolong	Attendance: 1,349; Referee: Johan Jahari

5 August 2010 25	Étoile FC	2–0	Woodlands Wellington	Jalan Besar Stadium
19:45 GMT+8	Loic Leclercq (yellow card) 21'; Karim Boudjema 64'; Anthony Moulin 77'; Frederic Mendy (yellow card) 84'	Report	(yellow card) 29' Anaz Abdul Hadee; (yellow card) 32' Sazali Salleh; (yellow card) 84' Luis Eduardo Hicks	Attendance: 929; Referee: Zaid Hussein

8 August 2010 26	Woodlands Wellington	0–1	Sengkang Punggol	Woodlands Stadium
19:45 GMT+8	Anaz Abdul Hadee (yellow card) 27'; Laakkad Abdelhadi (yellow card) 38'; Winston Yap (yellow card) 85'	Report	(yellow card) 26' Mamadou Diallo; (yellow card) 42' Nor Azli Yusoff; 80' Jordan Webb	Attendance: 1,234; Referee: Muhd Taqi

31 August 2010 27	Woodlands Wellington	0–1	Home United	Jalan Besar Stadium
19:45 GMT+8	Rizawan Abdullah 61'; Sazali Salleh (yellow card) 62'	Report	6' Sharil Ishak; (yellow card) 51' Chun Jae-Woon; 61' Choi Chul-Woo	Attendance: 1,010; Referee: Sukhbir Singh

6 September 2010 28	Geylang United	0–1	Woodlands Wellington	Bedok Stadium
19:45 GMT+8	Walid Lounis (yellow card) 38'; Rastislav Belicak (yellow card) 58'; Rastislav Belicak (yellow card) 64' (red card); Yasir Hanapi (yellow card) 78'	Report	85' Mohd Noor Ali	Attendance: 928; Referee: Abdul Malik

16 September 2010 29	Woodlands Wellington	2–4	Tampines Rovers	Woodlands Stadium
19:45 GMT+8	Winston Yap (yellow card) 38' (pen) Azlan Alipah 41'; Sazali Salleh (yellow card) 42'; Laakkad Abdelhadi 78'	Report	18' Aleksandar Đurić (pen); 55' Aleksandar Đurić; 60' Aliff Shafaein; 62' Ismadi Mukhtar	Attendance: 1,080; Referee: P. Pandian

24 September 2010 30	Balestier Khalsa	1–1	Woodlands Wellington	Toa Payoh Stadium
19:45 GMT+8	Paul Cunningham 20'; Vitor Borges da Souza (yellow card) 28'; Mushthafa Kamal (yellow card) 47'; Rivaldo Costa (yellow card) 53'; Nurhilmi Jasni (yellow card) 54'; Syaqir Sulaiman (yellow card) 90'	Report	45' Laakkad Abdelhadi (pen); (yellow card) 61' Sahairi Ramri	Attendance: 873; Referee: Abdul Malik

16 October 2010 31	Woodlands Wellington	0–3	Gombak United	Jalan Besar Stadium
19:45 GMT+8		Report	(yellow card) 31' Park Kang-Jin (pen); 64' Jang Jo-Yoon; 79' Fazrul Nawaz; 89' Hamqaamal Shah	Attendance: 721; Referee: W. Ravisanthiran

20 October 2010 32	SAFFC	1–0	Woodlands Wellington	Choa Chu Kang Stadium
19:45 GMT+8	Eduardo Federico Martinez 50'; Ivan Jerković (yellow card) 90'	Report	(yellow card) 77' Sahairi Ramri; (yellow card) 90' Kazuki Yoshino	Attendance: 1,088; Referee: Abdul Malik

3 November 2010 33	Albirex Niigata (S)	1–0	Woodlands Wellington	Jalan Besar Stadium
19:45 GMT+8	Masaya Sato (yellow card) 11'; Mitsuki Ichihara (yellow card) 26'; Atsushi Shimono 62'; Kazuki Kobayashi 90'	Report	(yellow card) 21' Anaz Abdul Hadee; (yellow card) 59' Sahairi Ramri; (yellow card) 64' Sazali Salleh; (yellow card) 72' Laakkad Abdelhadi	Attendance: 844; Referee: Zaid Hussein

== RHB Singapore Cup ==
=== First round ===
30 May 2010 First round	Tampines Rovers	2–1 (a.e.t)	Woodlands Wellington	Tampines Stadium
19:30 GMT+8	Park Yo-Seb 15'; Akihiro Nakamura 47'; Seiji Kaneko (yellow card) 69'; Satria Mad (yellow card) 81'; Aliff Shafaein 112'	Report	(yellow card) 23' Anaz Abdul Hadee; (yellow card) 33' Sahairi Ramri; 56' Laakkad Abdelhadi; (yellow card) 60' Luis Eduardo Hicks; (yellow card) 112' Kazuki Yoshino	Attendance: 2,494; Referee: Johan Jahari

== Singapore League Cup ==
=== First round ===
22 February 2010 First round	Woodlands Wellington	0–0 (pen. 4–3)	Albirex Niigata (S)	Woodlands Stadium
19:45 GMT+8	Luis Eduardo Hicks (yellow card) 20'; Anaz Abdul Hadee (yellow card) 60'; Asraf Rashid (yellow card) 73'	Report	(yellow card) 36' Mitsuki Ichihara; (yellow card) 96' Ryuta Hayashi	Attendance: 1,328; Referee: Abas Daud

=== Quarter-finals ===
26 February 2010 Quarter-finals	Tampines Rovers	0–1	Woodlands Wellington	Tampines Stadium
19:45 GMT+8	Ismadi Mukhtar (yellow card) 54'	Report	(yellow card) 39' Azlan Alipah; 63' Mohd Noor Ali; (yellow card) 82' Hafez Mawasi	Attendance: 1,341; Referee: K. Kalimuthu

=== Semi-finals ===
3 March 2010 Semi-finals	Gombak United	2–2 (pen. 3–4)	Woodlands Wellington	Jalan Besar Stadium
19:45 GMT+8	Jeremy Chiang 19'; Park Kang-Jin (yellow card) 49'; Hamqaamal Shah (yellow card) 62'; Bah Mamadou (yellow card) 90'; Ruhaizad Ismail (yellow card) 95'; Park Kang-Jin 120'	Report	(yellow card) 14' Sazali Salleh; (yellow card) 36' Laakkad Abdelhadi; 50' Rizawan Abdullah; (yellow card) 74' Azlan Alipah; (yellow card) 84' Winston Yap; (yellow card) 97' Sahairi Ramri; (yellow card) 109' Anaz Abdul Hadee; (yellow card) 114' Navin Neil Vanu	Attendance: 1,550; Referee: Abas Daud

=== Finals ===
7 March 2010 Finals	Woodlands Wellington	1–3	Étoile FC	Jalan Besar Stadium
19:45 GMT+8	Luis Eduardo Hicks (yellow card) 14'; Laakkad Abdelhadi 45'; Andy Ahmad (yellow card) 72'; Laakkad Abdelhadi (red card) 90'	Report	(yellow card) 38' Flavien Michelini; 50' Matthias Verschave; 85' Matthias Verschave (pen); 90' Leeroy Anton	Attendance: 2,814; Referee: P. Pandian

== Appearances and goals ==
No.	Pos	Nat	Player	Total		S-League		RHB Singapore Cup		Singapore League Cup	
No.	Pos	Nat	Player	Apps	Goals	Apps	Goals	Apps	Goals	Apps	Goals
1	GK	(Singapore) SGP	Fajar Sarib**	27	0	26+0	0	1+0	0	0+0	0
18	GK	(Singapore) SGP	Hafez Mawasi	11	0	6+1	0	0+0	0	4+0	0
2	DF	(Singapore) SGP	Winston Yap	30	1	25+0	1	1+0	0	4+0	0
4	DF	(Japan) JPN	Kazuki Yoshino**	34	3	29+0	3	1+0	0	4+0	0
5	DF	(Singapore) SGP	Sahairi Ramri	32	0	27+0	0	4+0	0	1+0	0
6	DF	(Singapore) SGP	Anaz Abdul Hadee	34	0	30+0	0	1+0	0	3+0	0
5	DF	(Chile) CHI	Luis Eduardo Hicks	34	0	29+1	0	1+0	0	3+0	0
16	DF	(Singapore) SGP	Munasar Abdul Rashid***	1	0	1+0	0	0+0	0	0+0	0
35	DF	(Singapore) SGP	Nardi Asani***	6	0	5+1	0	0+0	0	0+0	0
3	MF	(Singapore) SGP	Azlan Alipah	27	1	20+3	1	1+0	0	3+0	0
7	MF	(Singapore) SGP	Syed Karim	20	1	15+4	1	1+0	0	0+0	0
8	MF	(Singapore) SGP	Shahri Musa	16	1	11+4	1	1+0	0	0+0	0
11	MF	(Singapore) SGP	Mohd Noor Ali	36	3	31+0	2	1+0	0	4+0	1
12	MF	(Singapore) SGP	Asraf Rashid	25	0	11+9	0	0+1	0	4+0	0
13	MF	(Singapore) SGP	Guntur Djafril	29	0	10+14	0	1+0	0	4+0	0
14	MF	(Singapore) SGP	Sazali Salleh	34	0	28+2	0	1+0	0	3+0	0
17	MF	(Morocco) MAR	Rachid Lajane	14	0	6+8	0	0+0	0	0+0	0
31	MF	(Singapore) SGP	Azli Mahmud***	6	0	4+1	0	0+0	0	0+1	0
37	MF	(Singapore) SGP	Andy Ahmad***	4	0	1+2	0	0+0	0	1+0	0
9	FW	(Morocco) MAR	Laakkad Abdelhadi	30	10	23+2	8	1+0	1	4+0	1
19	FW	(Singapore) SGP	Rizawan Abdullah	31	2	15+13	1	0+0	0	2+1	1
36	FW	(Singapore) SGP	Navin Neil Vanu**	31	1	9+19	0	0+0	0	1+2	1

Last updated: 20 June 2012
Source: Match reports in Competitive matches

*** Denotes Prime League players

=== Goalscoring statistics ===
Includes all competitive matches. The list is sorted by shirt number when total goals are equal.

Ran	No.	Pos	Nat	Name	S-League	RHB Singapore Cup	League Cup	Total
1	9	FW	(Morocco)	Laakkad Abdelhadi	8	1	1	10
2	4	DF	(Japan)	Kazuki Yoshino	3	0	0	3
2	11	MF	(Singapore)	Mohd Noor Ali	2	0	1	3
3	19	FW	(Singapore)	Rizawan Abdullah	1	0	1	2
4	2	DF	(Singapore)	Winston Yap	1	0	0	1
4	3	MF	(Singapore)	Azlan Alipah	1	0	0	1
4	7	MF	(Singapore)	Syed Karim	1	0	0	1
4	8	MF	(Singapore)	Shahri Musa	1	0	0	1
4	36	FW	(Singapore)	Navin Neil Vanu	0	0	1	1
				TOTALS	18	1	3	22

Last updated: 21 June 2012
Source: Match reports in Competitive matches

== Disciplinary record ==
Includes all competitive matches. The list is sorted by shirt number when total cards are equal.

R	No.	Pos	Nat	Name	S-League			RHB Singapore Cup			Singapore League Cup			Total		
R	No.	Pos	Nat	Name	Yellow card	(yellow card) (yellow-red card)	Red card	Yellow card	(yellow card) (yellow-red card)	Red card	Yellow card	(yellow card) (yellow-red card)	Red card	Yellow card	(yellow card) (yellow-red card)	Red card
1	9	FW	(Morocco)	Laakkad Abdelhadi	4	0	0	0	0	0	1	0	1	5	0	1
2	4	DF	(Japan)	Kazuki Yoshino	7	1	0	1	0	0	0	0	0	8	1	0
3	11	MF	(Singapore)	Mohd Noor Ali	3	1	0	0	0	0	0	0	0	3	1	0
4	10	DF	(Chile)	Luis Eduardo Hicks	9	0	0	1	0	0	2	0	0	12	0	0
4	14	DF	(Chile)	Sazali Salleh	11	0	0	0	0	0	1	0	0	12	0	0
5	5	DF	(Singapore)	Sahairi Ramri	6	0	0	1	0	0	1	0	0	8	0	0
6	6	DF	(Singapore)	Anaz Abdul Hadee	4	0	0	1	0	0	2	0	0	7	0	0
7	36	FW	(Singapore)	Navin Neil Vanu	5	0	0	0	0	0	1	0	0	6	0	0
8	2	DF	(Singapore)	Winston Yap	4	0	0	0	0	0	1	0	0	5	0	0
8	3	MF	(Singapore)	Azlan Alipah	3	0	0	0	0	0	2	0	0	5	0	0
9	12	MF	(Singapore)	Asraf Rashid	3	0	0	0	0	0	1	0	0	4	0	0
10	17	MF	(Morocco)	Rachid Lajane	3	0	0	0	0	0	0	0	0	3	0	0
10	19	FW	(Singapore)	Rizawan Abdullah	3	0	0	0	0	0	0	0	0	3	0	0
11	7	MF	(Singapore)	Syed Karim	1	0	0	0	0	0	0	0	0	1	0	0
11	13	MF	(Singapore)	Guntur Djafril	1	0	0	0	0	0	0	0	0	1	0	0
11	18	GK	(Singapore)	Hafez Mawasi	0	0	0	1	0	0	0	0	0	1	0	0
11	31	MF	(Singapore)	Azli Mahmud***	1	0	0	0	0	0	0	0	0	1	0	0
				TOTALS	68	2	0	5	0	0	12	0	1	85	2	1

Last updated: 22 June 2012
Source: Match reports in Competitive matches

*** Denotes Prime League players
