= 2011 S.League =

S.League
- Season: 2011
- Champions: Tampines Rovers (3rd S.League title)
- AFC Cup: Tampines Rovers (S.League winners); Home United (Singapore Cup winners)
- Matches: 198
- Goals: 578 (2.92 per match)
- Top goalscorer: (Bosnia and Herzegovina) Mislav Karoglan (33)
- Biggest home win: Singapore Armed Forces 7–0 Woodlands Wellington
- Biggest away win: Tanjong Pagar United 0–6 Home United

The 2011 S.League was the 16th season of the S.League, the top professional football league in Singapore. Tampines Rovers FC won their third title. As in the previous season the S.League was not allowed to send a team to the AFC Champions League because of the participation of a foreign team in the league.

== Teams ==
Beijing Guoan Talent withdrew their participation in the league after just one season. They were replaced by Tanjong Pagar United, who returned to the highest football league of Singapore after a seven-year absence. The club will be based at Clementi Stadium.

In further changes, Sengkang Punggol were renamed to Hougang United. Moreover, Home United moved back to Bishan Stadium after splitting their previous season home matches between Clementi Stadium and Jalan Besar Stadium.

Location of teams in 2011 S.League

Team	Stadium	Capacity	Location	Main Sponsor	Apparel Sponsor
Albirex Niigata (S)	Jurong East Stadium	2,700	Jurong East	Canon	Adidas
Balestier Khalsa	Toa Payoh Stadium	3,900	Toa Payoh	Civic Ambulance; FTMS Global	Umbro
Étoile	Queenstown Stadium	3,800	Queenstown	-	Acono
Geylang United	Bedok Stadium	3,900	Bedok	-	Lotto
Gombak United	Jurong West Stadium	3,200	Jurong West	-	Erke
Home United	Bishan Stadium	4,100	Bishan	Coca-Cola	Kappa
Hougang United	Hougang Stadium	2,500	Hougang	-	Mitre
Singapore Armed Forces	Choa Chu Kang Stadium	4,600	Choa Chu Kang	Star Automotive Centre; United Engineers Limited	Umbro
Tampines Rovers	Tampines Stadium	3,600	Tampines	Hyundai	DAL
Tanjong Pagar United	Clementi Stadium	4,000	Clementi	Michezo Group	Thorb
Woodlands Wellington	Woodlands Stadium	4,300	Woodlands	-	Mitre
Young Lions	Jalan Besar Stadium	6,000	Kallang	Courts	Nike

== Foreign players ==
Each club is allowed to have up to a maximum of 4 foreign players.

Club	Player 1	Player 2	Player 3	Player 4	Prime League	Former Player
Balestier Khalsa	(South Korea) Lim Young-woo	(South Korea) Kim Young-kwang	(New Zealand) Paul Cunningham	(Australia) Mark McGough	(Serbia) Vahid Bogučanin	(Brazil) Vitor Borges
Geylang International	(South Korea) Kim Jae-hong	(South Korea) Jeon Byung-guk	(Japan) Yuta Nakano	(England) Daniel Hammond	None	(South Korea) Joo Ki-hwan (South Korea) Jung Hee-bong (Romania) Vasile Ghindaru
Gombak United	(South Korea) Park Kang-jin	(South Korea) Jang Jo-yoon	(South Korea) Jung Hee-bong	(Nigeria) Obadin Aikhena	(Republic of Ireland) Shane Ryan	(South Korea) Kwon Jin-sung
Home United	(South Korea) Kim Dae-eui	(Japan) Kenji Arai	(France) Frederic Mendy	(Cameroon) Valery Hiek	(Canada) Sherif El-Masri	(South Korea) Lee Sang-ha
Hougang United	(Argentina) Carlos Alberto Delgado	(Brazil) Diego Gama	(Brazil) Vitor Borges	(Canada) Jordan Webb	(Guinea) Mamadou M. Diallo	(Japan) Fumiya Kobayashi
SAFFC	(Japan) Taisuke Akiyoshi	(Australia) Goran Subara	(Croatia) Ivan Jerkovic	(Bosnia and Herzegovina) Mislav Karoglan	(Serbia) Luka Savić	(England) Daniel Hammond
Tampines Rovers	(Japan) Seiji Kaneko	(Japan) Akihiro Nakamura	(France) Benoit Croissant	(France) Yohann Lacroix	(Thailand) Hengthaveephokasub Panuwat	(South Korea) Park Yo-seb
Tanjong Pagar	(South Korea) Kim Seong-kyu	(South Korea) Kim Jong-oh	(Japan) Takaya Kawanabe	(France) Cyril Bagnost	None	(South Korea) Hyun Jong-woon
Woodlands	(South Korea) Hyun Jong-woon	(South Korea) Moon Soon-ho	(Japan) Fumiya Kobayashi	(Lebanon) Munier Raychouni	None	(Guyana) Adrian Butters (Brazil) Leonardo Aleixa da Costa (Scotland) Graham Tatters

- Albirex Niigata (S) and Étoile FC are not allowed to hire any foreigners.

== League table ==
Pos	Team	Pld	W	D	L	GF	GA	GD	Pts	Qualification
1	Tampines Rovers	33	25	3	5	71	25	+46	78	Qualification to AFC Cup Group Stage
2	Home United	33	25	2	6	81	29	+52	77	Qualification to AFC Cup Group Stage (Note: Qualified as 2011 Singapore Cup winners.)
3	Singapore Armed Forces	33	21	3	9	74	39	+35	66	
4	Albirex Niigata (S)	33	20	5	8	80	34	+46	65	
5	Étoile	33	21	4	8	65	36	+29	62 (Note: Étoile and Hougang United were deducted five points each for gross misconduct and bringing the game into disrepute which led to their match on 23 May 2011 being called off before kick-off.)	
6	Gombak United	33	14	6	13	43	41	+2	48	
7	Hougang United	33	15	3	15	55	63	−8	43	
8	Geylang United	33	13	2	18	43	63	−20	41	
9	Young Lions	33	7	6	20	33	54	−21	27	
10	Balestier Khalsa	33	7	5	21	28	63	−35	26	
11	Tanjong Pagar United	33	3	5	25	21	77	−56	14	
12	Woodlands Wellington	33	3	4	26	22	92	−70	13	

Source: RSSSF
Rules for classification: 1) points; 2) goal difference; 3) number of goals scored; 4) number of wins

== Top goalscorers ==
Rank	Player	Club	Goals
1	(Croatia) Mislav Karoglan	Singapore Armed Forces	33
2	(Singapore) Aleksandar Đurić	Tampines Rovers	26
3	(Japan) Shotaro Ihata	Albirex Niigata (S)	22
4	(France) Frédéric Mendy	Home United	21
5	(Singapore) Qiu Li	Home United	17
6	(Singapore) Fazrul Nawaz	Singapore Armed Forces	15
7	(Japan) Tatsuro Inui	Albirex Niigata (S)	14
7	(Canada) Jordan Webb	Hougang United	14
9	(Japan) Bruno Castanheira	Albirex Niigata (S)	12
9	(France) Jonathan Toto	Étoile	12

== Results ==
Every team will play the other teams a total of three times, either twice at home and once away or vice versa, for a total of 33 matches per team.

=== Regular home matches ===
Home \ Away	ALB	BAL	ETO	GLU	GOM	HOM	HOU	SAF	TAM	TPU	WLW	YLI
Albirex Niigata (S)		1–0	0–1	3–1	0–0	2–1	5–1	6–3	0–2	5–0	5–0	4–2
Balestier Khalsa	0–1		0–4	3–1	1–2	1–1	2–4	0–2	0–1	2–0	2–0	0–0
Étoile	2–7	0–0		3–2	2–0	2–0	4–2	1–0	1–2	3–0	3–0	1–2
Geylang United	1–0	0–3	0–2		1–0	1–3	2–1	2–0	0–1	2–0	1–0	3–3
Gombak United	1–5	2–0	1–0	2–0		1–4	0–1	0–1	1–1	3–2	3–0	1–2
Home United	2–1	5–2	2–1	2–1	3–0		4–2	3–2	2–0	3–1	2–0	2–0
Hougang United	1–1	2–2	2–1	0–2	3–2	0–5		1–3	2–0	4–3	1–0	1–0
Singapore Armed Forces	2–1	1–0	1–1	3–1	2–1	2–0	0–1		0–1	2–1	7–0	3–0
Tampines Rovers	3–1	5–0	1–0	0–2	1–1	1–1	5–2	1–2		4–1	5–0	4–1
Tanjong Pagar United	1–2	0–1	0–2	0–1	0–0	0–6	0–5	2–2	1–3		0–0	0–0
Woodlands Wellington	0–1	1–0	1–2	2–2	0–1	1–5	1–4	1–5	1–3	0–1		0–4
Young Lions	0–5	2–0	1–1	3–2	0–2	0–2	2–0	0–2	0–1	0–1	1–2	

Updated to match(es) played on 3 August 2011. Source: Soccerway
Legend: Blue = home team win; Yellow = draw; Red = away team win.

=== Extra home matches ===
Home \ Away	ALB	BAL	ETO	GLU	GOM	HOM	HOU	SAF	TAM	TPU	WLW	YLI
Albirex Niigata (S)			1–1	6–1	1–1			1–0	1–3	1–0		
Balestier Khalsa	1–3				0–2	0–4		1–3			2–2	1–0
Étoile		3–0					3–1		2–1	6–1		3–2
Geylang United		3–2	2–3				1–2	3–6	0–2	2–0		1–0
Gombak United			0–3	2–0			3–1	1–1	1–2			
Home United	0–4			5–0	2–1						2–1	
Hougang United		2–0				0–2					2–3	1–1
Singapore Armed Forces			4–1			0–4			1–3	4–0		3–0
Tampines Rovers		5–0				1–0	3–1			1–0		
Tanjong Pagar United		1–2				0–3	1–3				1–1	3–1
Woodlands Wellington	1–5		0–2	1–2	2–4				0–4			
Young Lions	1–1				0–1						5–1	

Updated to match(es) played on pre-season. Source: Soccerway
Legend: Blue = home team win; Yellow = draw; Red = away team win.

== Attendance figures ==
Pos	Team	Total	High	Low	Average	Change
1	Singapore Armed Forces	27,500	3,008	569	1,618	n/a
2	Home United	22,103	2,295	682	1,381	n/a
3	Albirex Niigata (S)	22,504	1,988	654	1,324	n/a
4	Tampines Rovers	21,045	2,907	457	1,315	n/a
5	Gombak United	19,775	2,352	382	1,163	n/a
6	Young Lions	16,603	2,728	344	1,038	n/a
7	Hougang United	14,879	1,683	314	875	n/a
8	Tanjong Pagar United	13,345	1,587	346	834	n/a
9	Balestier Khalsa	14,083	1,333	424	828	n/a
10	Geylang United	13,915	1,283	257	819	n/a
11	Étoile	9,657	1,044	221	617	n/a
12	Woodlands Wellington	9,221	859	244	576	n/a
	League total	205,054	3,008	221	1,036	n/a

Source: www.sleague.com

== S-League Awards Night Winners ==
Awards	Winners
Player of the Year	(Bosnia and Herzegovina) Mislav Karoglan (Singapore Armed Forces)
Young Player of the Year	(Japan) Tatsuro Inui (Albirex Niigata (S))
Coach of the Year	(Japan) Koichi Sugiyama (Albirex Niigata (S))
Top Scorer Award	(Bosnia and Herzegovina) Mislav Karoglan (Singapore Armed Forces)
Fair Play Award	(Japan) Albirex Niigata (S)

== See also ==
- 2011 Singapore Cup
- 2011 Singapore League Cup
- List of S.League transfers 2011
