= Leo Costa =

Leo Costa is a given name. It may refer to:

- Leo Costa (footballer, born 1984), Brazilian football striker
- Léo Costa (footballer, born 1986), Brazilian football attacking midfielder

== See also ==
- Leonardo Costa (disambiguation)
