= Bill Mamadou =

Singaporean footballer

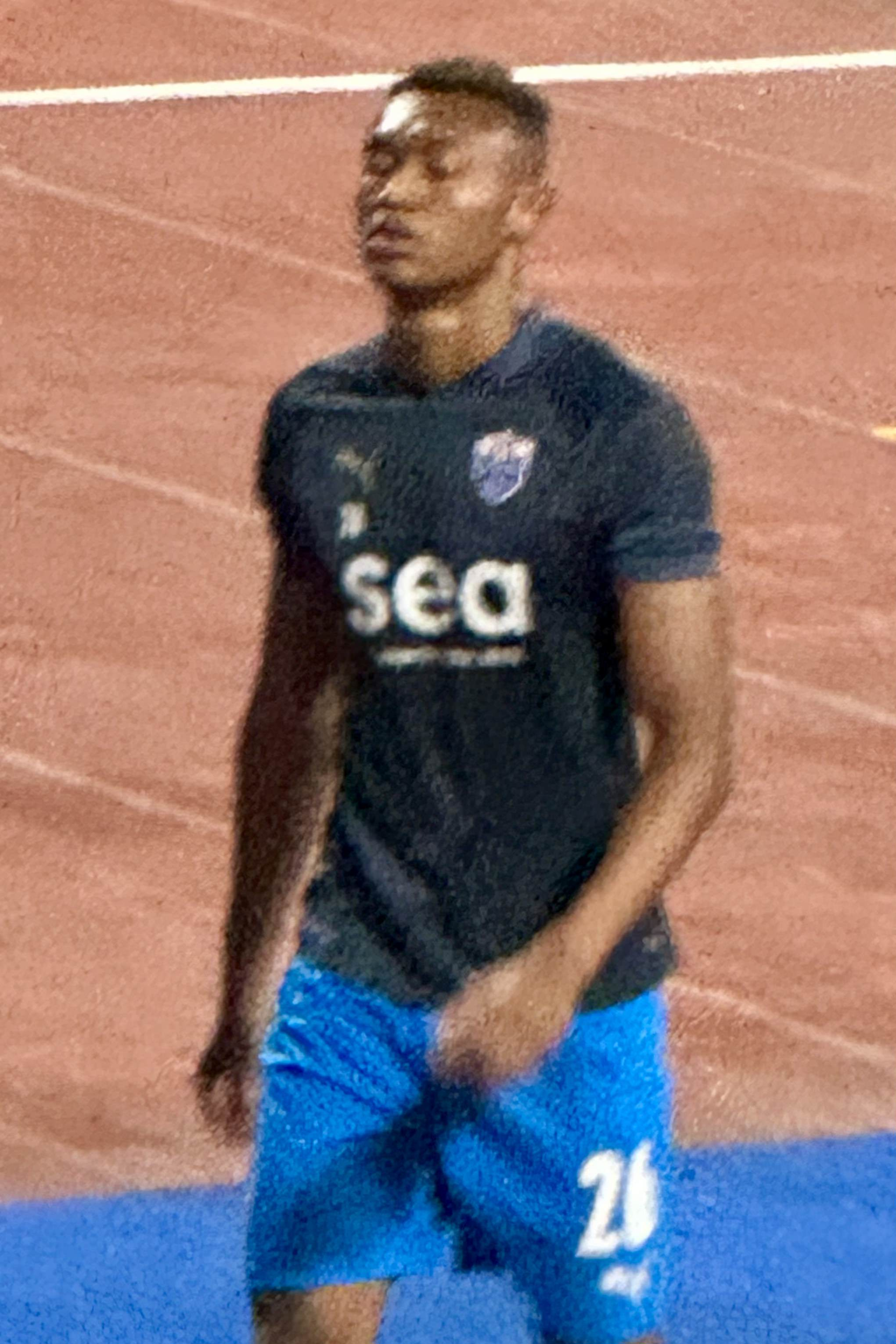
- Bill warming up for Lion City Sailors in 2024

Personal information
- Full name: Bah Bill Abuzar Mamadou
- Date of birth: 8 September 2001 (age 25)
- Place of birth: Singapore
- Position: Defender

Team information
- Current team: Balesier Khalsa
- Number: 23

Youth career
- National Football Academy

Senior career*
Years	Team	Apps	(Gls)
2019–2025	Lion City Sailors	22	(0)
2020–2021	→ Young Lions (loan)	8	(0)
2025	→ Young Lions (loan)	8	(0)
2025–2026	Nakhon Ratchasima	18	(0)
2026–	Balesier Khalsa	3	(1)

International career
2017	Singapore U17		
2023–2025	Singapore U23	7	(0)
- * Club domestic league appearances and goals as of 21 November 2026

Bah Bill Abuzar Mamadou (born 8 September 2001) is a Singaporean professional footballer who plays as a defender for Singapore Premier League club Balesier Khalsa.

Primarily a centre-back, Bill is also capable of playing either as a full-back or midfielder. He is the son of former footballer Bah Mamadou.

== Club career ==
=== Lion City Sailors ===
In 2019, Bill was promoted to the Home United senior team and played a total of 3 matches for the club for the 2019 season.

==== Loan to Young Lions ====
While serving the compulsory National Service, Bill joined the Young Lions on loan for two years from 2020 to 2021.

==== Return to Lion City Sailors ====
Bill returned to his parent club which is currently privatised and revamp as Lion City Sailors after his completion from National service commitments. He made his season debut against Tanjong Pagar United in a 7–0 at the Jalan Besar Stadium on 13 August 2022 for their second big-margin win for the season. For the match against Albirex Niigata (S), Harris was suspended and Pedro was injured for the match, which resulted in Bill starting the 1st of many matches for the season.

==== Loan back to Young Lions ====
On 21 February 2025, it was announced that Bill would rejoin Young Lions on a second stint on loan for the remainder of the 2024–25 season to get more playing time. Bill made a total of 11 appearances for the club, 8 in the league and 3 in the Singapore Cup.

=== Nakhon Ratchasima ===
Following the expiry of this contract with Lion City Sailors, Bill joined Thai League 1 side Nakhon Ratchasima on 14 June 2025.

== International career ==
Bill is eligible to represent Singapore or Mali due to his dad native origins. He represents Singapore Under-23 team in the 2023 Merlion Cup, 2023 SEA Games and the 2024 AFC U-23 Asian Cup qualification.

== Personal life ==
Bill is the son of former footballer and S.League legend, Bah Mamadou. He is of African descent through his father who was born in Mali. His dad formerly played for S.League clubs including Gombak United, Balestier Khalsa, and Woodlands Wellington.

== Career statistics ==
=== Club ===
As of 21 November 2026.

Appearances and goals by club, season and competition
Club	Season	League			National cup		League cup		Continental		Other		Total	
Club	Season	Division	Apps	Goals	Apps	Goals	Apps	Goals	Apps	Goals	Apps	Goals	Apps	Goals
Home United	2019	Singapore Premier League	3	0	0	0	0	0	0	0	—		3	0
Lion City Sailors	2020	Singapore Premier League	0	0	0	0	0	0	0	0	—		0	0
Lion City Sailors	2021	Singapore Premier League	0	0	0	0	0	0	0	0	—		0	0
Lion City Sailors	2022	Singapore Premier League	7	0	1	0	0	0	0	0	—		8	0
Lion City Sailors	2023	Singapore Premier League	7	0	2	0	0	0	0	0	—		9	0
Lion City Sailors	2024–25	Singapore Premier League	5	0	0	0	0	0	2 (Note: Appearance(s) in AFC Champions League Two)	0	1 (Note: Appearance(s) in ASEAN Club Championship)	0	8	0
Lion City Sailors	Total		19	0	3	0	0	0	2	0	1	0	25	0
Young Lions (loan)	2020	Singapore Premier League	6	0	0	0	0	0	—		—		6	0
Young Lions (loan)	2021	Singapore Premier League	2	0	0	0	0	0	—		—		2	0
Young Lions (loan)	Total		8	0	0	0	0	0	0	0	0	0	8	0
Young Lions (loan)	2024–25	Singapore Premier League	8	0	3	0	0	0	—		—		11	0
Nakhon Ratchasima	2025–26	Thai League 1	18	0	1	0	0	0	—		—		19	0
Balestier Khalsa	2026-27	Singapore Premier League	3	1	0	0	0	0	—		—		3	1
Career total			59	1	7	0	0	0	2	0	1	0	69	1

Notes

- Young Lions are ineligible for qualification to AFC competitions in their respective leagues.

=== International ===
==== U23 International caps ====
No	Date	Venue	Opponent	Result	Competition
1	24 March 2023	Jalan Besar Stadium, Jalan Besar, Singapore	Hong Kong	0–1 (lost)	Merlion Cup
2	26 March 2023	Jalan Besar Stadium, Jalan Besar, Singapore	Cambodia	1–2 (lost)	Merlion Cup
3	29 April 2023	Prince Stadium, Phnom Penh, Cambodia	Thailand	1–3 (lost)	2023 SEA Games
4	3 May 2023	Prince Stadium, Phnom Penh, Cambodia	Vietnam	1–3 (lost)	2023 SEA Games
5	6 Sept 2023	Việt Trì Stadium, Phú Thọ, Vietnam	Yemen	0-3 (lost)	2024 AFC U-23 Asian Cup qualification
6	9 Sept 2023	Việt Trì Stadium, Phú Thọ, Vietnam	Guam	1-1 (draw)	2024 AFC U-23 Asian Cup qualification

== Honours ==
=== Club ===
==== Lion City Sailors ====
- Singapore Cup: 2023
- Singapore Community Shield: 2022, 2024
