= Andy Ahmad =

Singaporean footballer

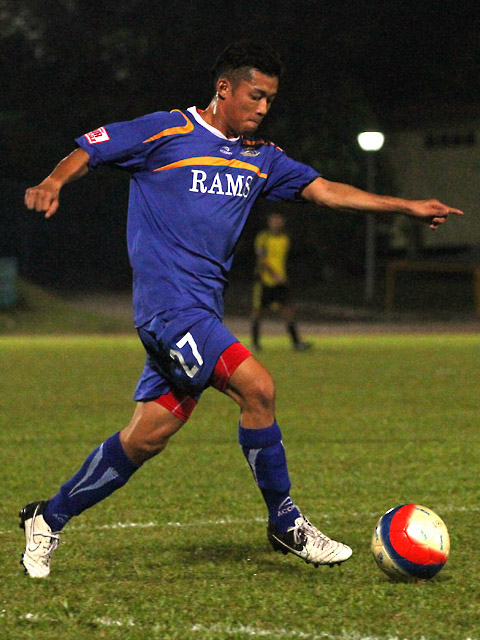
- Andy Ahmad in action for Woodlands Wellington.

Personal information
- Full name: Andy bin Ahmad
- Date of birth: April 5, 1991 (age 35)
- Place of birth: Singapore
- Height: 1.67 m (5 ft 5 1/2 in)
- Position: Midfielder

Team information
- Current team: Woodlands Wellington FC
- Number: 14

Senior career*
Years	Team	Apps	(Gls)
2010	Woodlands Wellington	3	(0)
2011	Gombak United	0	(0)
2012–	Woodlands Wellington	8	(0)
- * Club domestic league appearances and goals as of November 11, 2012

Andy Ahmad is a Singaporean footballer who plays for Woodlands Wellington FC, primarily in the Prime League as a midfielder.

Andy began his career with Woodlands Wellington in 2010, before he transferred to Gombak United for the 2011 S.League season. In 2012, he returned to Woodlands where he made 8 substitute appearances.

== Club Career Statistics ==
As of 4 November 2012

Club Performance		League		Cup		League Cup		Total				
Singapore		Prime League		FA Cup		--		Total				
Club	Season	Apps	Goals	Apps	Goals	Apps	Goals	Yellow card	(yellow card) (yellow-red card)	Red card	Apps	Goals
Woodlands Wellington	2012	10 (3)	4	0	0	-	-	3	0	0	10 (3)	4
Woodlands Wellington	2013	0	0	0	0	0	0	0	0	0	0	0
Club Performance		League		Cup		League Cup		Total				
Singapore		S.League		Singapore Cup		League Cup		Total				
Club	Season	Apps	Goals	Apps	Goals	Apps	Goals	Yellow card	(yellow card) (yellow-red card)	Red card	Apps	Goals
Woodlands Wellington	2010	1 (2)	0	0	0	1	0	0	0	0	2 (2)	0
Gombak United	2011	0	0	0	0	0	0	0	0	0	0	0
Woodlands Wellington	2012	0 (8)	0	0	0	0	0	0	0	0	0 (8)	0
Woodlands Wellington	2013	0	0	0	0	0	0	0	0	0	0	0

All numbers encased in brackets signify substitute appearances.
