= Ridhwan Jamaludin =

Singaporean footballer

Personal information
- Date of birth: January 23, 1985 (age 41)
- Place of birth: Singapore
- Height: 1.68 m (5 ft 6 in)
- Position: Winger

Team information
- Current team: Gombak United

Senior career*
Years	Team	Apps	(Gls)
2006–2007	Young Lions	??	(?)
2008–	Gombak United	?	(?)

International career
2010–	Singapore	0	(0)
- * Club domestic league appearances and goals as of Dec 31, 2009

Ridhwan Jamaludin is a Singapore international football player who plays for Gombak United.

== Club career ==
Previously, he played for young Lions before he joined Gombak United.

== International career ==
Selected for the National Team by Radojko Avramović for the national squad in the VFF Hanoi 2010 competition. He is yet to earn his 1st cap.
