= Shane Ryan (association footballer) =

Irish footballer

Personal information
- Date of birth: 27 October 1993 (age 33)
- Position: Striker

Team information
- Current team: Gombak United

Senior career*
Years	Team	Apps	(Gls)
2011–	Gombak United	1	(0)
- * Club domestic league appearances and goals as of 1 August 2011

Shane Ryan (born 27 October 1993) is an Irish professional footballer, who played for the S.League (of Singapore) club Gombak United, as a striker.
