= Jung Hee-bong =

South Korean footballer (born 1986)

Personal information
- Date of birth: 17 March 1986 (age 40)
- Position: Forward

Senior career*
Years	Team	Apps	(Gls)
2011	Geylang United	14	(1)
2011–2012	Gombak United	33	(9)
2013	Balestier Khalsa	13	(0)
- * Club domestic league appearances and goals

- Jung Hee-bong
- Hangul: 정희봉
- RR: Jeong Huibong
- MR: Chŏng Hŭibong

Jung Hee-bong (Korean: 정희봉; born 17 March 1986) is a South Korean former footballer.

== Career statistics ==
=== Club ===
Club	Season	League			National Cup		League Cup		Other		Total	
Club	Season	Division	Apps	Goals	Apps	Goals	Apps	Goals	Apps	Goals	Apps	Goals
Geylang United	2011	S.League	14	1	1	0	2	1	0	0	17	2
Gombak United	2011	S.League	10	6	0	0	0	0	0	0	10	6
Gombak United	2012	S.League	23	3	6	0	3	0	0	0	32	3
Gombak United	Total		33	9	6	0	3	0	0	0	42	9
Balestier Khalsa	2013	S.League	13	0	1	0	1	0	0	0	15	0
Career total			60	10	8	0	6	1	0	0	74	11
