= Moey Yoke Ham =

Moey Yoke Ham (died 16 December 2020) was a Malaysian football manager.

== Career ==
He was regarded as an important manager for Malaysian side Penang and managed Singaporean side Gombak United.
