= Mark McGough (soccer) =

Australian soccer player

Personal information
- Date of birth: 14 March 1988 (age 38)
- Place of birth: Australia
- Position: Forward

Senior career*
Years	Team	Apps	(Gls)
2006-2007	Moreland Zebras		
2010	Northcote City	14	(3)
2011	Hume City	7	(0)
2011	Balestier Khalsa	15	(8)
2013	Montalto Uffugo		
2014-2015	Heidelberg United	21	(3)
- * Club domestic league appearances and goals

Mark McGough (born 14 March 1988) is an Australian former soccer player who is last known to have played as a forward for Heidelberg United.

== Career ==
At the age of 15, McGough trialed for the youth academy of Derby County in the English second division. After that, he almost trialed for Club Atlético River Plate, one of Argentina's most successful clubs, before joining Northcote City in the Australian second division.

In 2011, he signed for Singaporean side Balestier Khalsa.

In 2013, McGough signed for Montalto Uffugo in the Italian fourth division.
