= Syed Karim =

Singaporean footballer

Personal information
- Full name: Syed Karim Syed Hussin
- Date of birth: May 21, 1984 (age 42)
- Place of birth: Singapore
- Height: 1.67 m (5 ft 5 1/2 in)
- Position: Midfielder

Team information
- Current team: Tanjong Pagar United FC
- Number: 14

Senior career*
Years	Team	Apps	(Gls)
2003–2006	Singapore Armed Forces FC	7	(0)
2006–2007	Gombak United FC	28	(1)
2008–2009	Singapore Armed Forces FC	33	(1)
2010–2011	Woodlands Wellington FC	38	(1)
2012–2015	Tanjong Pagar United FC	14	(0)
2015-2016	Sporting Westlake	1	(0)

Managerial career
- 2020: Lion City Sailors U21
- * Club domestic league appearances and goals

Syed Karim (born 21 May 1984) is a former professional footballer and manager who most recently was the manager of Lion City Sailors U21.

He is a natural centre midfielder.

== Club career ==
Syed Karim has previously played for S.League clubs Gombak United FC, Singapore Armed Forces FC, Woodlands Wellington FC, Tanjong Pagar, and Singapore Football League club Sporting Westlake.

He made his debut in Asia's premier club competition, AFC Champions League, as a second-half substitute in a group stage match against Kashima Antlers on 22 April 2009.

== Honours ==
=== Club ===
==== Singapore Armed Forces ====
- S.League: 2008, 2009
- Singapore Cup: 2008
