= Winston Yap =

Singaporean footballer

Personal information
- Date of birth: October 30, 1976 (age 50)
- Place of birth: Singapore
- Height: 1.83 m (6 ft 0 in)
- Position: Defender

Team information
- Current team: Woodlands Wellington

Senior career*
Years	Team	Apps	(Gls)
1996	Tampines Rovers	0	(0)
1997–1998	SAFFC	0	(0)
2001	Geylang United	33	(1)
2002–2003	SAFFC	29	(0)
2004	Balestier Khalsa	23	(0)
2006–2007	Gombak United	28	(0)
2007–2009	Sengkang Punngol	47	(0)
2010	Woodlands Wellington	25	(1)

International career
2002	Singapore	2	(0)
- * Club domestic league appearances and goals as of Dec 31, 2009

Winston Yap was a former Singapore international football player who last played for Woodlands Wellington in the S-League.

He retired in 2010 to pursue a career in coaching, making it his third and final retirement from professional football.

== Career ==
=== Club career ===
Previously, he played for Tampines Rovers and Gombak United.

He retired twice, from 2005 & 2009. However, he made a comeback with Gombak United & Woodlands Wellington F.C.

He won four S.League titles, three with SAFFC in 1997, 1998, and 2002, and one with Geylang United in 2001.

=== International career ===
He played twice for the National Squad in 2002 and has not played for it since.
