= Patrick Paran =

Singaporean footballer

Personal information
- Full name: Patrick Brian Paranjody
- Date of birth: 29 July 1987 (age 39)
- Place of birth: Singapore
- Height: 1.77 m (5 ft 10 in)
- Position: Second striker

Senior career*
Years	Team	Apps	(Gls)
2011–2012	Tanjong Pagar United	-	(4)
2012–2013	Balestier Khalsa	-	(4)
2014–2015	Woodlands Wellington	-	(2)

International career^{‡}
2011–2012	Singapore	1	(0)
- * Club domestic league appearances and goals ‡ National team caps and goals as of 10 February 2013

Patrick Brian Paranjody (born 29 July 1987), commonly known as Patrick Paran, is a Singaporean former footballer who played as a striker and winger for Tanjong Pagar United FC, Balestier Khalsa FC & Woodlands Wellington FC from 2011 to 2014.

== Club career ==
Paran began his professional playing career in 2011 when Tanjong Pagar United FC returned to the S-League. With no prior experience at football age-group levels, he had a successful trial with the club after a recommendation from his Singapore Institute of Management (SIM) University coach, Marko Kraljevic. Paran would continue to pursue his BSc in Accounting & Finance while playing football professionally in Singapore.

In 2011, Paran rejected an offer by the Singapore FA to join its team, Young Lions FC.

Paran went on to establish himself as regular starter for a Tanjong Pagar United FC side which lacked experience and were widely tipped to be wooden spoonist due to the lack of established names on their roster. Paran was a combination of speed and strength, and led the line for the Jaguars for the season. He was especially known for pressuring defenders into committing mistakes, and wore his heart on his sleeve. Fearless in the tackle and a never-say-die attitude made him stand out among opposition coaches.

For the 2012 season, Paran moved to Toa Payoh-based outfit Balestier Khalsa FC. After turning down several offers, he made the decision to work with renowned Australian coach, Darren Stewart. His time with the club was not fond as he struggled with a series of niggling injuries which kept him off the field. He did however help the club to win the 2013 Singapore League Cup and a 6th and 4th-place finish in the 2012 and 2013 S-League Seasons.

Paran moved north to Woodlands Wellington FC in 2014, following coach Darren Stewart to the club. After a successful start to the season and with the club occupying a top half place in the S-League. Things fell apart with the departure of the coach and a season-ending ankle injury which sent him to the operating theatre. Patrick would recover to feature in the last two games of the season before calling time on his playing career with the announcement of the closure of the football club.

Paran retired from football in 2015 after graduating from university.

== International career ==
Things got even better for the rookie in 2011 as the National Team came calling, 8 months into his professional career. Paran was called up by Singapore National Team Coach Radojko Avramovic, to be part of Round 3 Qualifying Stage for the 2014 World Cup.

== Post-playing career ==
After retirement from competitive football, Paran joined Sport Singapore where he continues his passion for sport by working with at-risk youth and engaging them through football.
