= Leonardo Costa =

Leonardo Costa may refer to:

- Leonardo Costa (swimmer) (born 1977), Brazilian swimmer
- Leonardo Costa (chess player) (born 2008), German chess grandmaster
