= Bah Mamadou =

Retired footballer

Personal information
- Date of birth: 31 October 1979 (age 47)
- Place of birth: Kayes, Mali
- Height: 1.85 m (6 ft 1 in)
- Position: Defender

Senior career*
Years	Team	Apps	(Gls)
1996–1998	Real Bamako		
1998–2000	Étoile du Congo		
2001–2002	Gombak United	65	(4)
2003–2005	Balestier Khalsa	49+	(3+)
2006	Home United	16	(0)
2007	Woodlands Wellington	27	(1)
2008–2010	Gombak United	95	(5)
2011–2012	Singapore Armed Forces	45	(1)
2014-2015	Woodlands Wellington	9	(1)

International career
2006	Singapore	1	(0)
- * Club domestic league appearances and goals

Bah Mamadou (born 31 October 1979) is a retired footballer. Born in Mali, he represented Singapore at the international level after playing most of his career in the Singapore Premier League.

== Personal life ==
Mamadou is married to Rachael Bah. They have 4 children: Bill, Danish, Kaiden and Carina Aminata. Bill is also a professional footballer, making his debut in the Singapore Premier League in 2019.

== Honors ==
Étoile du Congo

- Congo Premier League: 2000
- Coupe du Congo: 2000

Woodlands Wellington

- Singapore League Cup: 2007

Gombak United

- Singapore League Cup: 2008

Singapore Armed Forces

- Singapore Cup: 2012
