= Ruhaizad Ismail =

Singaporean footballer

Personal information
- Date of birth: March 5, 1982 (age 44)
- Place of birth: Singapore
- Height: 1.78 m (5 ft 10 in)
- Position: Midfielder

Team information
- Current team: Tanah Merah United

Senior career*
Years	Team	Apps	(Gls)
2003–2004	Balestier Khalsa	47	(1)
2005	SAFFC	4	(0)
2005	Young Lions	9	(1)
2006–2011	Gombak United	158	(18)
2012–2014	Balestier Khalsa	11	(3)
2015	GFA Sporting Westlake		
2016	Balestier United		
2022	Tanah Merah United		

International career
2003–	Singapore	2	(0)
- * Club domestic league appearances and goals as of Dec 31, 2009

Ruhaizad Ismail is a Singapore international football player who plays for Tanah Merah United.

== Club career ==
Previously he played for SAFFC, Young Lions and Gombak United.

== International career ==
Ismail has played twice for the Singapore national team.

== Honours ==
Balestier Khalsa

- Singapore Cup: 2014
- League Cup: 2013
