= Sazali Salleh =

Singaporean footballer

Personal information
- Date of birth: 18 January 1980 (age 46)
- Place of birth: Singapore
- Height: 1.70 m (5 ft 7 in)
- Position: Midfielder

Senior career*
Years	Team	Apps	(Gls)
2000–2001	Home United	3	(0)
2002	Geylang United	21	(0)
2003	Tanjong Pagar United	30	(0)
2004	Balestier Khalsa	25	(0)
2005–2008	Woodlands Wellington	104	(2)
2009	Sengkang Punggol	24	(0)
2010–2011	Woodlands Wellington	58	(0)
2012	Tampines Rovers	17	(0)
2013–2014	Tanjong Pagar United	22	(0)

International career
2004–2006	Singapore	3	(0)
- * Club domestic league appearances and goals

Sazali Salleh is a former Singapore international football player who plays for Tanjong Pagar United in the S.League.

== Club career ==
Sazali has played for seven clubs in the S-League, namely Home United, Geylang United, Tanjong Pagar United, Balestier Khalsa, Sengkang Punggol, Woodlands Wellington, and Tampines Rovers.

In 2012, Sazali joined Tampines Rovers.

== International career ==
Sazali has a total of three caps for the National Team.
