= Anaz Abdul Hadee =

Singaporean footballer (born 1983)

Anaz Hadee
Personal information
- Date of birth: 24 September 1983 (age 43)
- Place of birth: Singapore
- Height: 1.70 m (5 ft 7 in)
- Position: Defender

Team information
- Current team: Tampines Rovers
- Number: 12

Senior career*
Years	Team	Apps	(Gls)
2008–2010	Woodlands Wellington	59	(0)
2011	Balestier Khalsa	25	(0)
2012–2014	Tampines Rovers	46	(0)
2015	Geylang International	5	(0)
- * Club domestic league appearances and goals as of 8 April 2015

Anaz Abdul Hadee (born 24 September 1983) is a Singaporean professional footballer who plays as a defender for Tampines Rovers in the S.League.

== Career ==
Anaz Hadee has been involved in professional football since the age of 24. He started his S.League career with Woodlands Wellington and moved on to Balestier Khalsa in 2011.

In 2012, Anaz secured a lucrative contract to play for Tampines Rovers. He took up the offer and was rewarded with a Singapore Cup runners-up medal in that year, and S.League medals in the same year and consecutively in 2013.

Due to his exceptional performance, he was listed as one of the top 10 signings of the S.League in 2012.
