= Graham Tatters =

Scottish footballer

Personal information
- Full name: Graham Tatters
- Date of birth: 28 June 1985 (age 41)
- Place of birth: Elgin, Scotland
- Height: 5 ft 10 in (1.78 m)
- Position: Defender

Team information
- Current team: Hatyai FC

Youth career
- 2001–2003: Elgin City

College career
Years	Team	Apps	(Gls)
2004–2008	Charlotte 49ers	39	(4)

Senior career*
Years	Team	Apps	(Gls)
2009	Wilmington Hammerheads	13	(0)
2009–2010	Elgin City	9	(1)
2010	FC Tampa Bay	16	(0)
2011	Woodlands Wellington	0	(0)
2012;	Hat Yai F.C.	0	(0)
- * Club domestic league appearances and goals as of 14 February 2011

Graham Tatters (born 28 June 1985) is a Scottish footballer who plays for Hat Yai F.C. in the Thai Second Division.

== Career ==
=== Youth and college ===
Tatters was a trainee and youth player at Scottish club Elgin City, and was named Elgin's U-16 Player of the Year in 2001, before moving to the United States to play college soccer at University of North Carolina at Charlotte in 2004. He was named to the A10 All Championship Team and the Davidson Adidas Classic All Tournament Team in 2007, and was his team's Most Valuable Player in 2007 and 2008.

He redshirted his sophomore season in 2005 after being diagnosed with lymphoma, but recovered to continue his college career the following year.

=== Professional ===
Tatters turned professional in 2009 when he signed for the Wilmington Hammerheads of the USL Second Division. He made his professional debut on 5 June 2009 in a 1–0 win over the Bermuda Hogges.

Tatters rejoined Elgin City in October 2009, before returning to the United States in early 2010 to play for FC Tampa Bay in the USSF Division 2 Professional League.

Tatters signed for Singaporean S-League club Woodlands Wellington in 2011, and made his debut for the club on 14 February in a game against Hougang United. He was released by the club in the 2011 off-season.

In 2012, he signed for Hat Yai F.C. and currently plys his trade in the Thai Second Division.

== Personal ==
In 2010 Tatters' became a member of the Live Strong Foundation as a "Global Envoy" helping to raise awareness about issues relating to cancer.

Tatters' father, Graham Tatters Sr., is the former manager of Scottish Highland League club Lossiemouth, and the current chairman of Elgin City.

Married to Dana Clay Tatters from Shelby, NC.

== Honors ==
=== Wilmington Hammerheads ===
- USL Second Division Regular Season Champions (1): 2009
