= Adrian Butters =

Canadian-Guyanese footballer (born 1988)

Personal information
- Date of birth: 15 July 1988 (age 38)
- Place of birth: Canada
- Height: 1.86 m (6 ft 1 in)
- Position: Defender

College career
Years	Team	Apps	(Gls)
2019	Ontario Tech Ridgebacks	2	(0)

Senior career*
Years	Team	Apps	(Gls)
2009–2010	Toronto Lynx	15	(0)
2011	Woodlands Wellington	10	(0)
2012	Juventus IF		
2012	Valentine Phoenix		
2015	Oakville Blue Devils		
2016	York Region Shooters		
2016–2017	Vaughan Azzurri	7	(1)
2017	York Region Shooters		

International career^{‡}
2011–	Guyana	3	(2)
- * Club domestic league appearances and goals as of 13:10, 24 July 2018 (UTC) ‡ National team caps and goals as of 13:10, 24 July 2018 (UTC)

Adrian Butters (born 15 July 1988) is a professional footballer who plays as a defender. Born in Canada, he represents Guyana at international level.

== Club career ==
Butters played with the Toronto Lynx of the USL Premier Development League in the 2009 and 2010 seasons. He spent the 2011 season with Singaporean club Woodlands Wellington. After a spell in Sweden with Juventus IF, he signed for Australian club Valentine Phoenix in April 2012.

In 2015, he signed with Oakville Blue Devils in their inaugural season in League1 Ontario and won the 2015 League1 Championship, subsequently also winning the 2015 Inter-Provincial Cup series against PLSQ champions Mont-Royal Outremont.

In 2016, he signed with the York Region Shooters of the Canadian Soccer League, and since then has also featured for Vaughan Azzurri in League1 Ontario. He scored in the 2016 Championship match against FC London as Vaughan won the League1 Ontario title. He returned to the York Region Shooters for the 2017 season.

== College career ==
In 2019, he played for the Ontario Tech Ridgebacks, playing in two games.

== International career ==
Butters has represented Guyana at senior international level, making his debut in 2011.

=== International career statistics ===
As of 24 July 2018

Guyana
Year	Apps	Goals
2011	1	0
2012	0	0
2013	0	0
2014	0	0
2015	1	0
2016	1	2
Total	3	2

=== International goals ===
Scores and results list Guyana's goal tally first.

No	Date	Venue	Opponent	Score	Result	Competition
1.	11 October 2016	Leonora Stadium, Leonora, Guyana	Jamaica	1–0	2–4	>2017 Caribbean Cup qualification
2.	11 October 2016	Leonora Stadium, Leonora, Guyana	Jamaica	2–0	2–4	>2017 Caribbean Cup qualification
