= Leo Costa (footballer, born 1984) =

Brazilian footballer

Personal information
- Full name: Leonardo Aleixa da Costa
- Date of birth: April 15, 1984 (age 42)
- Place of birth: Rio de Janeiro, Brazil
- Height: 2.03 m (6 ft 8 in)
- Position: Striker

Senior career*
Years	Team	Apps	(Gls)
	Semeando	?	(?)
	Clube Atlético Castelo Branco	?	(?)
	Cachoeiras	?	(?)
2010	Volyn Lutsk	19	(5)
2011	Woodlands Wellington FC		
2013–2013	FC RM Hamm Benfica		
- * Club domestic league appearances and goals

Leonardo "Leo" Aleixa da Costa (born April 15, 1984, in Rio de Janeiro, Brazil) is a Brazilian footballer.

== Career ==
Leo Costa made his professional debut for Semeando in the Campeonato Carioca. After, he played for Clube Atlético Castelo Branco and Cachoeiras.

In March 2010 Leo transferred to Volyn Lutsk.

== Honours ==
- Volyn Lutsk
  - 2 place in the Ukrainian First League: 2010
