= Gombak United FC =

Singaporean football club

Gombak United
- Full name: Gombak United Football Club
- Nickname: The Bulls
- Founded: 1960; 66 years ago (as Redhill Rangers FC); 1998; 28 years ago (as Gombak United)
- Ground: Bukit Gombak Stadium
- Capacity: 3,000
- Chairman: John Yap
- League: S.League
- 2012: S.League, 9th of 13
Home colours	Away colours

Former club crest

Gombak United Football Club was a professional football club based in Bukit Gombak, Singapore that last competed in the top tier of the Singapore football league system. The club took part in the S.League from 1998 to 2002, and from 2006 to 2012. During the early years of the S. League, Gombak United played their home games at Bukit Gombak Stadium. They have won the Singapore League Cup once.

== History ==
Gombak United made their S-League debut in 1998 after securing a 10-year deal worth S$5 million with Shakey’s Pizza. Prior to joining the S.League, the club was known as Redhill Rangers FC. The club than changed its name to Gombak United in 1998.

From 1998 to 2002, the club played their S.League home games at the Bukit Gombak Stadium before pulling out of the S.League at the end of the 2002 season due to financial difficulties.

Gombak United returns to the S.League in 2006 and moved their home games to Jurong West Stadium. They pulled out for the second time before the 2013 season due red flags in their financial projections.

In December 2015, the club officially wrote to the FAS for permission to return to the S.League in 2017.

In 2016, Gombak United was one of the three ex-S.League clubs being told to cease profit-generating operations and vacate stadium clubhouses. The revenue generated from the clubhouses is meant to help sustain football operations, and in that way contributes to the development of the sport in Singapore. The Bulls kickstarted their Centre of Excellence (COE) in 2016 with two youth teams, which are funded through profits from clubhouse operations. The clubhouse was moved from Gombak Stadium to Kitchener Road.

At the end of 2017, Chairman John Yap applied to the Football Association of Singapore to return to the Singapore Premier League, but the application was not successful.

There were speculations that the club may return to Singapore Premier League in 2020. However, John Yap mentioned that he had not been approached by the FAS to prepare the club for a return. The party seeking to lead the club forward decided to put the plans on ice.

=== 2008 Singapore League Cup winners ===
En route to the League cup final, Gombak United beat cup favourites Home United in the quarter-final and Young Lions in the semi-final. They faced Korean Super Reds in the final where O. J. Obatola scored a 90' min goal to secure the team’s first piece of silverware in their history

== Seasons ==
Season	S.League								Singapore Cup	Singapore League Cup
Season	Pos	P	W	D	L	F	A	Pts	Singapore Cup	Singapore League Cup
1998	10	20	3	4	13	25	52	13	Group stage	
1999	5	22	8	8	6	35	35	32	Quarter-finals	
2000	5	22	11	4	7	33	26	37	Quarter-finals	
2001	10	33	8	4	21	36	72	28	Group stage	
2002	12	33	2	6	25	33	83	12	Group stage	
2003										
2004
2005
2006	8	30	8	8	14	48	54	32	Round of 16	
2007	4	33	13	9	11	54	40	48	Quarter-finals	2nd Runners-up
2008	5	33	14	10	9	47	39	54	Round of 16	Winners
2009	3	30	14	11	5	52	32	53	Round of 16	Quarter-finals
2010	6	33	12	10	11	33	25	46	Round of 16	Semi-finals
2011	6	33	14	6	13	43	41	48	Quarter-finals	Quarter-finals
2012	9	24	7	8	9	23	29	29	2nd Runners-up	Quarter-finals
2013										
2014

- 2003 saw the introduction of penalty shoot-outs if a match ended in a draw in regular time. Winners of penalty shoot-outs gained two points instead of one.
- Gombak United sat out the S.League from 2003 to 2005, and for a second spell from 2013.

Last updated on 25 February 2014

== Managers ==
- (Australia) David O'Connor (1999)
- (Malaysia) Moey Yoke Ham (Jan 2000 – Aug 2001)
- (Croatia) Ivan Raznevich (Jan – Feb 2002)
- (Scotland) Jimmy Pearson (May – Aug 2002)
- (Singapore) Salim Moin (Jan 2006 – Dec 2007)
- (Singapore) Swandi Ahmad (Jan – Jul 8, 2007)
- (Singapore) A. Shasi Kumar (interim) (Jul – Jan 2009)
- (Australia) Darren Stewart (Jan – Dec 11, 2009)
- (Singapore) K. Balagumaran (Jan – Dec 13, 2012)

== Honours ==
=== Domestic ===
- Singapore League Cup
  - Winners (1): 2008

== Records and statistics ==
=== Top 10 all-time appearances ===
Rank	Player	Years	Club appearances
1	(Singapore) Bah Mamadou	2001–2002 2008–2010	160
2	(Singapore) Ruhaizad Ismail	2006–2011	158
3	(Singapore) Jaslee Hatta	2006–2011	153
4	(Nigeria) Obadin Aikhena	2006–2007 2010–2012	125
5	(Nigeria) O. J. Obatola	2006–2009	117
6	(Singapore) Jeremy Chiang	2008–2012	102
7	(Singapore) Agu Casmir	2007 2008–2010	83
8	(Singapore) Zaiful Nizam	2006–2012	81
9	(Singapore) Ridhwan Jamaludin	2008–2012	89
10	(Singapore) Hamqaamal Shah	2009–2012	78

=== Top 10 all-time scorers ===
Rank	Player	Club appearances	Total goals
1	(Nigeria) O. J. Obatola	117	62
2	(Singapore) Agu Casmir	83	34
3	(Singapore) Fazrul Nawaz	46	25
4	(South Korea) Jang Jo-yoon	60	16
5	(Singapore) Ruhaizad Ismail	158	13
6	(Nigeria) Alfred Emuejeraye	18	11
7	(Nigeria) Obadin Aikhena	125	10
7	(South Korea) Jung Hee-bong	47	10
9	(Nigeria) Kingsley Njoku	27	8
10	(France) Julien Durand	29	7

- Biggest Wins: 6–1 vs Super Reds (On 6 June 2007)
- Heaviest Defeats: 9–3 vs Home United (On 18 July 1998)
- Youngest Goal scorers: Fareez Farhan ~ 16 years 10 months 27 days old (On 25 June 2011 vs SAFFC)
- Oldest Goal scorers: Mustaqim Manzur ~ 30 years 9 months days old (On 28 October 2012 vs Loyola)
- Youngest ever debutant: Fareez Farhan ~ 16 years 8 months 13 days old (On 11 April 2011 vs Albirex Niigata Singapore)

== Awards ==
=== Singapore Premier League ===
- Young Player of the Year
  - (Nigeria) Gabriel Obatola (2010)
- Coach of the Year
  - (Singapore) Alan Wong (1998)
  - (Singapore) John Yap (2000)

=== Others ===
- People's Choice Award
  - (Nigeria) Gabriel Obatola (2009)
