= 2015 Hougang United FC season =

Hougang United
2015 season
- Chairman: Bill Ng
- Head coach: K. Balagumaran
- Stadium: Hougang Stadium

The 2015 season was Hougang United's 18th consecutive season in the top flight of Singapore football and in the S.League. Along with the S.League, the club will also compete in the Prime League, the Singapore Cup and the Singapore League Cup.

== Squad ==
As of 6 January 2017.

=== Sleague ===
No.	Name	Nationality	Date of birth (age)	Previous club
Goalkeepers
1	Ridhuan Barudin	(Singapore)	23 March 1987 (age 39)	(Singapore) Tampines Rovers
18	Jasper Chan	(Singapore)	7 November 1988 (age 37)	(Singapore) Eunos Crescent FC
22	Ahmadulhaq Che Omar	(Singapore)	11 February 1981 (age 45)	(Singapore) Woodlands Wellington
Defenders
3	Delwinder Singh	(Singapore)	5 August 1992 (age 34)	(Singapore) Young Lions
6	Kunihiro Yamashita	(Japan)	29 May 1986 (age 40)	(Singapore) Tampines Rovers
12	Faizal Amir	(Singapore)	23 December 1984 (age 41)	(Singapore) Balestier Khalsa
16	Kenneth Chang	(Singapore)	7 July 1992 (age 34)	(Singapore) Home United Prime League
17	Faiz Salleh	(Singapore)	17 July 1992 (age 34)	(Singapore) Young Lions
21	Lau Meng Meng	(Singapore)	29 March 1983 (age 43)	(Singapore) Geylang United
23	Yuki Uchiyama	(Japan)	7 May 1995 (age 31)	(Japan) Hokkaido Consadole Sapporo
Midfielders
4	Taufiq Ghani	(Singapore)	19 November 1989 (age 36)	(Singapore) Woodlands Wellington
7	Atsushi Shimono	(Japan)	27 April 1988 (age 38)	(Singapore) Woodlands Wellington
8	Carlos Alberto Delgado	(Argentina)	3 January 1986 (age 40)	(Myanmar) Nay Pyi Taw F.C.
13	Ruzaini Zainal	(Singapore) (Malaysia)	17 October 1988 (age 37)	(Singapore) Tanjong Pagar United
14	Fazli Jaffar	(Singapore)	9 May 1983 (age 43)	(Singapore) Warriors FC
15	Tengku Mushadad	(Singapore)	18 August 1994 (age 32)	(Singapore) Tanjong Pagar United
19	Nurhilmi Jasni	(Singapore)	17 December 1986 (age 39)	(Singapore) Balestier Khalsa
Forwards
2	Fairoz Hasan	(Singapore)	26 November 1988 (age 37)	(Singapore) Gombak United
5	Muhaymin Salim	(Singapore)	5 May 1992 (age 34)	(Singapore) Young Lions
9	Diego Gama de Oliveira	(Brazil)	13 May 1990 (age 36)	(Indonesia) Pusamania Borneo F.C.
10	Vuk Sotirović	(Serbia)	13 July 1982 (age 44)	(Serbia) FK Novi Pazar
11	Fareez Farhan	(Singapore)	29 July 1994 (age 32)	(Singapore) Young Lions
Players who left club during season
3	Renshi Yamaguchi	(Japan)	16 September 1992 (age 33)	(Japan) Hosei University
7	Shunsuke Nakatake	(Japan)	19 June 1990 (age 36)	(Singapore) Eunos Crescent FC
9	Manato Takahashi	(Japan)	7 April 1990 (age 36)	(Japan) Fujieda MYFC
10	Chupe	(Equatorial Guinea)	9 May 1980 (age 46)	(Laos) Lanexang United F.C.
14	Matthew Abraham	(Singapore)	5 March 1989 (age 37)	(Singapore) Tampines Rovers

== Transfers ==
=== Pre-season transfers ===
==== In ====
Position	Player	Transferred From	Ref
GK	(Singapore) Ridhuan Barudin	(Singapore) Tampines Rovers	
DF	(Japan) Kunihiro Yamashita	(Singapore) Tampines Rovers	
DF	(Japan) Yuki Uchiyama	(Japan) Hokkaido Consadole Sapporo	Season loan
DF	(Singapore) Ahmad Zaki Bagharib	(Singapore) Balestier Khalsa	
MF	(Japan) Renshi Yamaguchi	(Japan) Hosei University	
MF	(Singapore) Goh Swee Swee	(Singapore) Woodlands Wellington	
MF	(Singapore) Muhaymin Salim	(Singapore) Young Lions FC	
MF	(Singapore) Nur Ridho	(Singapore) Young Lions FC	
MF	(Singapore) (Malaysia) Ruzaini Zainal	(Singapore) Tanjong Pagar United	
MF	(Singapore) Tengku Mushadad	(Singapore) Tanjong Pagar United	
FW	(Singapore) Fareez Farhan	(Singapore) Young Lions FC	
FW	(Equatorial Guinea) Chupe	(Laos) Lanexang United F.C.	
FW	(Japan) Manato Takahashi	(Japan) Fujieda MYFC	

==== Out ====
Position	Player	Transferred To	Ref
GK	(Singapore) Nazri Sabri	(Singapore) Eunos Crescent FC	
GK	(Singapore) Fadhil Salim		
DF	(Singapore) Wahyudi Wahid	(Singapore) LionsXII	
DF	(Brazil) Igor Ferreira Alves	(Australia) Darwin Olympic SC	
DF	(Croatia) Igor Čerina	(Singapore) Balestier Khalsa	
DF	(Singapore) Syaqir Sulaiman	(Singapore) Warriors FC	
MF	(Singapore) Fazli Jaffar	(Singapore) Warriors FC	
MF	(Indonesia) Sutanto Tan	(Indonesia) Mitra Kukar F.C.	
MF	(Singapore) Haidil Sufian		
MF	(Singapore) Salihin Osman	(Singapore) Eunos Crescent FC(NFL Club)	
MF	(Singapore) (Indonesia) Erwan Gunawan		
FW	(Brazil) Geison Moura	(United States) Minnesota United FC	
FW	(Brazil) Diego Gama de Oliveira	(Indonesia) Pusamania Borneo F.C.	

=== Trial ===
Position	Player	From	Ref

=== Mid-season transfers ===
==== In ====
Position	Player	Transferred To	Ref
DF	(Singapore) Delwinder Singh	(Singapore) Young Lions FC	
MF	(Singapore) Fazli Jaffar	(Singapore) Warriors FC	
MF	(Japan) Atsushi Shimono	(Singapore) Woodlands Wellington	
MF	(Argentina) Carlos Alberto Delgado	(Myanmar) Nay Pyi Taw F.C.	
FW	(Brazil) Diego Gama de Oliveira	(Indonesia) Pusamania Borneo F.C.	
FW	(Cyprus) Nicolas Vitorović	(Lithuania) FK Nevėžis	

==== Out ====
Position	Player	Transferred To	Ref
DF	(Singapore) Matthew Abraham		
MF	(Japan) Renshi Yamaguchi	(Laos) Lao Toyota F.C.	
MF	(Japan) Shunsuke Nakatake	(Malaysia) Kuantan FA	
MF	(Singapore) Firman Hanif	(Singapore) Yishun Sentek Mariners FC	
FW	(Japan) Manato Takahashi		
FW	(Equatorial Guinea) Chupe	(Malta) Għajnsielem F.C.	

== Coaching staff ==
Position	Name	Ref.
Head coach	(Singapore) Philippe Aw	
Assistant coach	(Singapore) Clement Teo	
Prime League Coach	(Singapore) Robin Chitrakar	
Fitness coach	(Germany) Dirk Schauenberg	
Goalkeeping coach	(Singapore) Lim Queen Cher	
Team manager	(Singapore) Clement Teo	
Sports trainer	(Singapore) Thomas Pang	
Kitman		

== Team statistics ==
=== Appearances and goals ===
No.	Pos.	Player	Sleague		Singapore Cup		League Cup		Total	
No.	Pos.	Player	Apps.	Goals	Apps.	Goals	Apps.	Goals	Apps.	Goals
1	GK	(Singapore) Ridhuan Barudin	24	0	1	0	3	0	28	0
2	FW	(Singapore) Fairoz Hasan	19	2	1	0	4	0	24	2
3	DF	(Singapore) Delwinder Singh	15	1	0	0	2	0	17	1
4	MF	(Singapore) Taufiq Ghani	9	0	1	0	1	0	11	0
5	FW	(Singapore) Muhaymin Salim	15	0	1	0	2	0	18	0
6	DF	(Japan) Kunihiro Yamashita	24	6	0	0	2	0	26	6
7	MF	(Japan) Atsushi Shimono	14	0	0	0	4	0	18	0
8	MF	(Argentina) Carlos Alberto Delgado	13	0	0	0	4	1	17	1
9	FW	(Brazil) Diego Gama de Oliveira	15	1	0	0	4	2	19	3
10	FW	(Serbia) Vuk Sotirović	14	6	0	0	3	1	17	7
11	FW	(Singapore) Fareez Farhan	21	1	1	0	3	1	25	2
12	DF	(Singapore) Faiz Amir	15	0	1	0	2	0	18	0
13	MF	(Singapore) (Malaysia) Ruzaini Zainal	12	0	0	0	0	0	0	0
14	MF	(Singapore) Fazli Jaffar	12	0	0	0	4	0	16	0
15	MF	(Singapore) Tengku Mushadad	12	0	1	0	4	0	17	0
16	DF	(Singapore) Kenneth Chiang	10	0	0	0	4	1	14	1
17	DF	(Singapore) Faiz Salleh	15	0	0	0	0	0	0	0
18	GK	(Singapore) Jasper Chan	2	0	0	0	0	0	2	0
19	MF	(Singapore) Nurhilmi Jasni	25	5	1	0	4	0	30	5
21	DF	(Singapore) Lau Meng Meng	16	0	1	0	1	0	18	0
22	GK	(Singapore) Ahmadulhaq Che Omar	1	0	0	0	1	0	2	0
23	DF	(Japan) Yuki Uchiyama	17	2	1	0	1	0	19	2
30	MF	(Singapore) Haidil Sufian	2	0	0	0	0	0	0	0
Players who have played this season but had left the club or on loan to other club
3	DF	(Japan) Renshi Yamaguchi	7	0	1	0	0	0	1	0
7	MF	(Japan) Shunsuke Nakatake	11	0	1	0	0	0	11	0
8	MF	(Singapore) Firman Hanif	0	0	0	0	0	0	0	0
9	FW	(Japan) Manato Takahashi	8	0	1	0	0	0	0	0
10	FW	(Equatorial Guinea) Chupe	11	3	1	1	0	0	0	0
14	MF	(Singapore) Matthew Abraham	5	0	0	0	0	0	0	0

== Competitions ==
=== S.League ===
Win Draw Loss

Round 1

2 March 2015 Round 1	Hougang United (Singapore)	1–1	(Singapore) Young Lions FC	Hougang Stadium
	Chupe 19'		Iqbal Hussain 16'	Referee: Sukhbir Singh

6 March 2015 Round 2	Hougang United (Singapore)	1–1	(Singapore) Home United	Jalan Besar Stadium
	Yuki Uchiyama 34'		Ken Ilsø 42' (pen.)	Referee: Ahmad A'Qashah

12 March 2015 Round 3	Geylang International (Singapore)	0–0	(Singapore) Hougang United	Bedok Stadium
				Referee: W. Ravisanthiran

18 March 2015 Round 4	Tampines Rovers (Singapore)	2–0	(Singapore) Hougang United	Jurong West Stadium
	Ridhuan Muhamad 33'; Fahrudin Mustafić 71'			Referee: Nathan Chan

4 April 2015 Round 5	Hougang United (Singapore)	2–3	(Brunei) DPMM FC	Hougang Stadium
	Kunihiro Yamashita 1'; Chupe 87'		Paulo Sérgio 13' 19'; Brian McLean 57'	Referee: Syahir Ahamadi

9 April 2015 Round 6	Warriors FC (Singapore)	1–0	(Singapore) Hougang United	Woodlands Stadium
	Fazrul Nawaz 68'			Referee: G. Letchman

18 April 2015 Round 7	Hougang United (Singapore)	0–1	(Singapore) Balestier Khalsa	Hougang Stadium
			Miroslav Krištić 81'	Referee: W. Ravisanthiran

23 April 2015 Round 8	Hougang United (Singapore)	3–3	(Malaysia) Harimau Muda B	Hougang Stadium
	Nurhilmi Jasni 10'; Kunihiro Yamashita 17'; Fairoz Hasan 68'		Amirul Hisyam 45' (pen.) Shahrul Igwan 80'; Adam Nor Azlin 85'	Referee: Nathan Chan

1 May 2015 Round 9	Albirex Niigata (S) (Singapore)	2–1	(Singapore) Hougang United	Jurong East Stadium
	Rui Kumada 20'; Hikaru Mizuno 51'		Kunihiro Yamashita 33'	Referee: Farhad Mohd

Round 2

14 May 2015 Round 10	Home United (Singapore)	4–0	(Singapore) Hougang United	Yishun Stadium
	Yasir Hanapi 20'; Kamel Ramdani 26'; Yuki Uchiyama 31' (o.g.); Azhar Sairudin 58'			Referee: Muhd Taqi

19 May 2015 Round 11	Hougang United (Singapore)	1–0	(Singapore) Geylang International	Hougang Stadium
	Chupe 73'			Referee: Nathan Chan

20 July 2015 Round 12	Young Lions FC (Singapore)	1–3	(Singapore) Hougang United	Hougang Stadium
	Adam Swandi 70'		Delwinder Singh 10'; Kunihiro Yamashita 20'; Fairoz Hasan 90+5'	Referee: Sukhbir Singh

24 July 2015 Round 13	Hougang United (Singapore)	0–3	(Singapore) Tampines Rovers	Jalan Besar Stadium
			Mateo Roskam 66' 80'; Fahrudin Mustafić 73' (pen.)	Referee: Farhan Mohd

29 July 2015 Round 14	Brunei DPMM	1–1	(Singapore) Hougang United	Hassanal Bolkiah National Stadium
	Azwan Ali Rahman 33'		Vuk Sotirović 68'	Referee: Sukhbir Singh

4 August 2015 Round 15	Hougang United (Singapore)	4–1	(Singapore) Warriors FC	Hougang Stadium
	Kunihiro Yamashita 11'; Vuk Sotirović 63' 78'; Diego Gama de Oliveira 86'		Fazrul Nawaz 28'	Referee: Syahir Ahamadi

7 August 2015 Round 16	Balestier Khalsa (Singapore)	3–2	(Singapore) Hougang United	Jalan Besar Stadium
	Jonathan Xu 2'; Ignatius Ang 24'; Tarik Čmajčanin 58'		Emir Lotinac 47' (o.g.); Kunihiro Yamashita 90'	Referee: Farhan Mohd

19 August 2015 Round 17	Harimau Muda B (Malaysia)	0–1	(Singapore) Hougang United	Hang Jebat Stadium
			Vuk Sotirović 24'	Referee: G. Letchman

28 August 2015 Round 18	Hougang United (Singapore)	1–1	(Singapore) Albirex Niigata (S)	Jalan Besar Stadium
	Nurhilmi Jasni 34'		Itsuki Yamada 90'	Referee: Ahmad A'Qashah

Round 3

27 September 2015 Round 19	Hougang United (Singapore)	0–1	(Singapore) Home United	Hougang Stadium
			Ken Ilsø 63' (pen.)	Referee: Nathan Chan

1 October 2015 Round 20	Hougang United (Singapore)	2–2	(Singapore) Young Lions FC	Jalan Besar Stadium
	Nurhilmi Jasni 1' 74'		Afiq Noor 47'; Shameer Aziq 49'	Referee: Farhan Mohd

17 October 2015 Round 21	Tampines Rovers (Singapore)	1–0	(Singapore) Hougang United	Jurong West Stadium
	Jamil Ali 45'			Referee: Muhd Taqi

20 October 2015 Round 22	Hougang United (Singapore)	1–2	(Brunei) DPMM FC	Hougang Stadium
	Vuk Sotirović 51'		Kenneth Chiang 31' (o.g.); Rafael Ramazotti 72'	Referee: Jansen Foo

26 October 2015 Round 23	Warriors FC (Singapore)	2–0	(Singapore) Hougang United	Jalan Besar Stadium
	Fazrul Nawaz 42' (pen.) 61'			Referee: Jansen Foo

1 November 2015 Round 24	Hougang United (Singapore)	1–1	(Singapore) Balestier Khalsa	Hougang Stadium
	Yuki Uchiyama 73'		Fadhil Noh 89'	Referee: Nathan Chan

6 November 2015 Round 25	Hougang United (Singapore)	1–2	(Malaysia) Harimau Muda B	Hougang Stadium
	Nurhilmi Jasni 1'		Syafwan Syahlan 35' 89'	Referee: Jansen Foo

9 November 2015 Round 26	Geylang International (Singapore)	2–2	(Singapore) Hougang United	Bedok Stadium
	Shawal Anuar 72'; Bruno Castanheira 90+3'		Vuk Sotirović 76'; Fareez Farhan 90'	Referee: Farhad Mohamed

20 November 2015 Round 27	Albirex Niigata (S) (Singapore)	1–0	(Singapore) Hougang United	Jurong East Stadium
	Fumiya Kogure 2' (pen.)			Referee: Farhad Mohd

Pos	Team	Pld	W	D	L	GF	GA	GD	Pts
6	Home United	27	9	9	9	38	34	+4	36
7	(Malaysia) Harimau Muda B (Note: The three foreign clubs – Albirex Niigata (S), DPMM FC and Harimau Muda – as well as the Football Association of Singapore (FAS) under-23 team, Young Lions, are not eligible for any AFC competition spots.)	27	9	6	12	29	40	−11	33
8	Geylang International	27	7	7	13	36	44	−8	28
9	(Singapore) Young Lions	27	7	6	14	30	43	−13	27
10	Hougang United	27	4	9	14	28	42	−14	21

Source: S.League
Rules for classification: 1) points; 2) goal difference; 3) number of goals scored; 4) number of wins

=== Singapore Cup ===
Win Draw Loss

=== Singapore TNP League Cup ===
Pos	Team	Pld	W	D	L	GF	GA	GD	Pts	Qualification
1	Geylang International	3	2	1	0	10	4	+6	7	Advance to semi-final
2	Hougang United	3	1	2	0	4	3	+1	5	Advance to semi-final
3	(Brunei) DPMM FC	3	1	0	2	7	5	+2	3	
4	Singapore Recreation Club	3	0	1	2	1	10	−9	1	

Source: S.League

==== Group matches ====
Win Draw Loss
