= 2014 Hougang United FC season =

Hougang United
2014 season
- Chairman: Bill Ng
- Head coach: Amin Nasir
- Stadium: Hougang Stadium

The 2014 season was Hougang United's 17th consecutive season in the top flight of Singapore football and in the S.League. Along with the S.League, the club also competed in the Prime League, the Singapore Cup and the Singapore League Cup.

== Squad ==
As of 6 January 2017.

=== Sleague ===
No.	Name	Nationality	Date of birth (age)	Previous club
Goalkeepers
1	Nazri Sabri	(Singapore)	20 September 1989 (age 37)	(Singapore) Woodlands Wellington
15	Fadhil Salim	(Singapore)	24 January 1983 (age 43)	(Singapore) Sengkang Punggol
21	Jasper Chan	(Singapore)	7 November 1988 (age 38)	(Singapore) Eunos Crescent FC
29	Hakiim Sutar	(Singapore)	15 October 1992 (age 34)	Youth Team
Defenders
3	Syaqir Sulaiman	(Singapore)	12 August 1986 (age 40)	(Singapore) Balestier Khalsa
4	Wahyudi Wahid	(Singapore)	20 October 1989 (age 37)	(Singapore) Geylang International
5	Igor Cerina	(Croatia)	10 October 1988 (age 38)	(Croatia) NK Solin
8	Firman Hanif	(Singapore)	5 March 1992 (age 34)	(Singapore) Young Lions FC
12	Faizal Amir	(Singapore)	23 December 1984 (age 41)	(Singapore) Balestier Khalsa
16	Faiz Salleh	(Singapore)	17 July 1992 (age 34)	(Singapore) Young Lions
20	Lau Meng Meng	(Singapore)	29 March 1983 (age 43)	(Singapore) Geylang United
22	Igor Ferreira	(Brazil)	21 February 1985 (age 41)	(Singapore)
Midfielders
6	Benedict Chua	(Singapore)	18 June 1990 (age 36)	(Singapore) Hougang United
7	Shunsuke Nakatake	(Japan)	19 June 1990 (age 36)	(Singapore) Eunos Crescent FC
17	Azhar Sairudin	(Singapore)	30 September 1986 (age 40)	(Singapore) Home United
19	Nurhilmi Jasni	(Singapore)	17 December 1986 (age 39)	(Singapore) Balestier Khalsa
40	Nurul Islam	(Singapore)		(Singapore) Geylang United Youth
42	Susanto Tan	(Indonesia)	4 May 1994 (age 32)	(Indonesia) Pelita Jaya Youth
Forwards
2	Fairoz Hasan	(Singapore)	26 November 1988 (age 37)	(Singapore) Gombak United
9	Diego Gama de Oliveira	(Brazil)	13 May 1990 (age 36)	(Indonesia) Pusamania Borneo F.C.
10	Geison Moura	(Brazil)	16 July 1986 (age 40)	(United States) Minnesota United FC
11	Fazli Jaffar	(Singapore)	9 March 1983 (age 43)	(Singapore) Gombak United
13	Erwan Gunawan	(Singapore) (Indonesia)	20 March 1987 (age 39)	(Singapore) Warriors FC
14	Haidil Sufian	(Singapore)		Singapore Viper FC
23	Nazirul Islam	(Singapore)		(Singapore) Geylang United Youth
Players who left club during season
18	Đurica Župarić	(Croatia)	22 September 1984 (age 42)	(Croatia) NK HAŠK

== Transfers ==
=== Pre-season transfers ===
==== In ====
Position	Player	Transferred From	Ref
GK	(Singapore) Jasper Chan	(Singapore) Eunos Crescent FC	Free
GK	(Singapore) Nazri Sabri	(Singapore) Woodlands Wellington	Free
DF	(Singapore) Faizal Amir	(Singapore) Balestier Khalsa	Free
DF	(Singapore) Faiz Salleh	(Singapore) Young Lions FC	Free
DF	(Singapore) Firman Hanif	(Singapore) Young Lions FC	Free
DF	(Singapore) Wahyudi Wahid	(Singapore) Geylang International	Free
DF	(Croatia) Đurica Župarić	(Croatia) NK HAŠK	Free
MF	(Japan) Shunsuke Nakatake	(Singapore) Eunos Crescent FC	Free
FW	(Brazil) Geison Moura	(United States) Minnesota United FC	Free
FW	(Brazil) Diego Gama de Oliveira	(Indonesia) Pusamania Borneo F.C.	Free
FW	(Singapore) Erwan Gunawan	(Singapore) Warriors FC	Free

==== Out ====
Position	Player	Transferred To	Ref
GK	(Singapore) Ridzuan Fatah Hasan	(Singapore) Yishun Sentek Marine	Free
DF	(Singapore) Shahir Hamzah	(Singapore) Yishun Sentek Marine	Free
DF	(Singapore) Hasree Zais	Singapore Recreational Club	Free
MF	(Singapore) Sobrie Mazelan	(Singapore) Woodlands Wellington	Free
MF	(England) Thomas Beattie	(Singapore) Warriors FC	Free
MF	(Canada) Jerome Baker	(Thailand) Bangkok Glass B	Free
MF	(Singapore) Basit Hamid	Retired	Free
MF	(Singapore) Fazly Hasan	Retired	Free
FW	(England) Liam Shotton	(England) Leek Town F.C.	Free
FW	(Guinea) Mamadou Diallo	Retired	Free

=== Trial ===
Position	Player	From	Ref

=== Mid-season transfers ===
==== In ====
Position	Player	Transferred To	Ref
DF	(Brazil) Igor Ferreira Alves	NA	Free

==== Out ====
Position	Player	Transferred To	Ref
DF	(Croatia) Đurica Župarić	(Myanmar) Kanbawza FC	Free

== Coaching staff ==
Position	Name	Ref.
Head coach	(Singapore) Amin Nasir	
Assistant coach	(Singapore) Clement Teo	
Prime League Coach	(Singapore) Robin Chitrakar	
Fitness coach	(Germany) Dirk Schauenberg	
Goalkeeping coach	(Singapore) Lim Queen Cher	
Team manager	(Singapore) Clement Teo	
Sports trainer	(Singapore) Thomas Pang	
Kitman		

== Team statistics ==
=== Appearances and goals ===
No.	Pos.	Player	Sleague		Singapore Cup		League Cup		Total	
No.	Pos.	Player	Apps.	Goals	Apps.	Goals	Apps.	Goals	Apps.	Goals
1	GK	(Singapore) Nazri Sabri	6+1	0	0	0	0	0	7	0
2	FW	(Singapore) Fairoz Hasan	18+7	1	1	0	3+1	0	30	1
3	DF	(Singapore) Syaqir Sulaiman	22	0	0	0	1	0	23	0
4	DF	(Singapore) Wahyudi Wahid	26+4	0	1	0	3+1	0	35	0
5	DF	(Croatia) Igor Cerina	21+1	4	1	0	0	0	23	4
6	MF	(Singapore) Benedict Chua	0+1	0	0	0	0	0	1	0
7	MF	(Japan) Shunsuke Nakatake	31	0	1	0	4	0	36	0
8	DF	(Singapore) Firman Hanif	18+2	2	1	0	1	0	22	2
9	FW	(Brazil) Diego Gama de Oliveira	23+6	11	1	0	2+1	1	33	12
10	FW	(Brazil) Geison Moura	25+7	23	1	0	3+1	2	37	25
11	FW	(Singapore) Fazli Jaffar	15+13	2	1	0	4	0	33	2
12	DF	(Singapore) Faizal Amir	23+5	0	0+1	0	2+2	0	33	0
13	FW	(Singapore) Erwan Gunawan	13+14	0	0+1	0	1+1	0	30	0
15	GK	(Singapore) Fadhil Salim	22	0	1	0	3	0	26	0
16	DF	(Singapore) Faiz Salleh	9+2	1	0	0	3+1	1	15	3
17	MF	(Singapore) Azhar Sairudin	18+8	0	1	0	2+2	0	31	0
18	DF	(Croatia) Djurica Zuparic	8+1	0	1	0	0	0	10	0
19	MF	(Singapore) Nurhilmi Jasni	21+8	5	0	0	3+1	1	33	6
20	DF	(Singapore) Lau Meng Meng	25+1	1	0	0	4	0	30	1
21	GK	(Singapore) Jasper Chan	4	0	0	0	1	0	5	0
22	DF	(Brazil) Igor Ferreira Alves	7+4	1	0	0	3+1	0	15	1
42	MF	(Indonesia) Susanto Tan	0+3	0	0	0	0	0	3	0

== Competitions ==
=== S.League ===
Win Draw Loss

Pos	Team	Pld	W	D	L	GF	GA	GD	Pts	Qualification
5	(Japan) Albirex Niigata (S) (Note: The three foreign clubs – Albirex Niigata (S), DPMM FC and Harimau Muda B – as well as the Football Association of Singapore (FAS) under-23 team, Young Lions, are not eligible for any AFC competition spots.)	27	13	5	9	51	40	+11	44	
6	Balestier Khalsa	27	11	7	9	46	34	+12	40	Qualification to AFC Cup Group Stage (Note: Qualified as 2014 Singapore Cup winners.)
7	Hougang United	27	12	6	9	49	42	+7	42	
8	Geylang International	27	8	8	11	33	44	−11	32	
9	Tanjong Pagar United	27	8	5	14	35	44	−9	29	

Source: RSSSF
Rules for classification: 1) points; 2) goal difference; 3) number of goals scored

=== Singapore Cup ===
Win Draw Loss

26 May 2014	Tanjong Pagar United	1–0	Hougang United	Queenstown Stadium, Queenstown
19:30	Zerka 76'	Report		Attendance: 560; Referee: Jansen Foo (SIN)

=== Singapore TNP League Cup ===
==== Group matches ====
Win Draw Loss

8 July 2014
20:00

Balestier Khalsa	0–3	Hougang United
	Report	Geison 34'; Faiz 88'; Diego 90'

Hougang Stadium
Referee: W. Ravisanthiran (SIN)
14 July 2014
20:00

Hougang United	2–3	(Brunei) DPMM FC
Aziz 29' (o.g.); Gamble 84' (o.g.)	Report	O'Donovan 56', 77', 80' (pen.)

Hougang Stadium
Referee: Sukhbir Singh (SIN)

==== Quarter Final ====
17 July 2014
20:00

Home United	1–2	Hougang United
Lee 17'	Report	Geison 83' (pen.); Nurhilmi 86'

Bishan Stadium
Referee: Ahmad A'Qashah (SIN)

==== Quarter Final ====
17 July 2014
20:00

Home United	1–2	Hougang United
Lee 17'	Report	Geison 83' (pen.); Nurhilmi 86'

Bishan Stadium
Referee: Ahmad A'Qashah (SIN)
