= 2015 S.League =

S.League
- Season: 2015
- Champions: (Brunei) DPMM FC (1st title)
- Charity Shield: Warriors FC
- AFC Champions League: Tampines Rovers (S.League runner-up)
- AFC Cup: Balestier Khalsa (S.League 4th)
- Matches: 270
- Goals: 356 (1.32 per match)
- Top goalscorer: (Brazil) Rafael Ramazotti de Quadros (21 Goals)
- Biggest home win: Geylang International 6-0 Warriors FC (20 November 2015)
- Biggest away win: Warriors FC 0-6 (Japan) Albirex Niigata (S) (14 March 2015)
- Highest scoring: Home United 4-4 (Brunei) DPMM FC (8 Goals) (17 October 2015)
- Longest winless run: Geylang International
- All statistics correct as of 9 December 2015.

The 2015 S.League was the 20th season since the establishment of the S.League, the top-flight Singaporean professional league for association football clubs. The league was also known as the Great Eastern Yeo's S.League due to sponsorship reasons. Warriors FC were the defending champions.

== Changes from 2014 ==
The league underwent a number of changes in its 20th season in order to increase its competitiveness:

- The number of clubs was reduced from 12 to 10, with the withdrawal of Tanjong Pagar United due to financial problems, and the merger of Woodlands Wellington and Hougang United.
- The league returned to a three-round format used from 2001 to 2011.
- The foreign player quota remained at five per club but incentives were given to those who signed an under-21 player.
- The passing time for the mandatory 2.4 km fitness test was lowered from 10 mins to 9 mins 45 s.

A new rule on age restrictions – a maximum of five players aged 30 and above and a minimum of three under-25 players for clubs with a 22-man squad, a maximum of four players aged 30 and above and a minimum of two under-25 players for clubs with a 20-man squad – was later reversed.

== Teams ==
A total of 10 teams contested the league. Tanjong Pagar United withdrew from the league due to financial problems, while Woodlands Wellington merged into Hougang United. Albirex Niigata (S), DPMM FC and Harimau Muda are invited foreign clubs from Japan, Brunei and Malaysia respectively.

=== Stadiums and locations ===
Location of 2015 S.League teams
Locations of the 2015 S.League teams based in Singapore

Team	Stadium	Capacity
(Japan) Albirex Niigata (S)	Jurong East Stadium	2,700
Balestier Khalsa	Toa Payoh Stadium	3,900
(Brunei) DPMM FC	Hassanal Bolkiah National Stadium	30,000
Geylang International	Bedok Stadium	3,900
(Malaysia) Harimau Muda B	Hang Jebat Stadium	40,000
Home United	Yishun Stadium	3,400
Hougang United	Hougang Stadium	3,000
Tampines Rovers	Jurong West Stadium	4,200
Warriors FC	Woodlands Stadium	4,300
(Singapore) Young Lions	Jalan Besar Stadium	8,000

=== Personnel and sponsoring ===
Note: Flags indicate national team as has been defined under FIFA eligibility rules. Players may hold more than one non-FIFA nationality.

Team	Head coach	Kit manufacturer	Shirt sponsor
(Japan) Albirex (S)	(Japan) Tatsuyuki Okuyama	Mafro Sports	Canon
Balestier Khalsa	(Croatia) Marko Kraljević	Umbro	Civic
(Brunei) DPMM FC	(Scotland) Steve Kean	Lotto	
Geylang International	(Germany) Jörg Steinebrunner	Dreamatron	
(Malaysia) Harimau Muda B	(Malaysia) Razip Ismail	Nike	
Home United	Philippe Aw	Puma	AVEC
Hougang United	K. Balagumaran	Vonda	ESW
Tampines Rovers	V. Sundramoorthy	Mikasa	Hyundai
Warriors FC	Razif Onn	Joma	Warriors
(Singapore) Young Lions	(Germany) Jürgen Raab	Nike	Courts

=== Managerial changes ===
Team	Outgoing manager	Manner of departure	Replaced by	Date
Tampines Rovers	Rafi Ali	End of caretaker role	V. Sundramoorthy	9 December 2014
Home United	(South Korea) Lee Lim-saeng	Resigned	Philippe Aw	15 December 2014
Hougang United	Amin Nasir	Compassionate Leave	Salim Moin	31 January 2015
(Singapore) Young Lions	Aide Iskandar	Resigned	(Germany) Jürgen Raab	11 June 2015
Warriors FC	(England) Alex Weaver	Mutual consent	Razif Onn	26 October 2015
Hougang United	Salim Moin	Contract ended	K Balagumaran	5 November 2015

=== Foreigners ===
Players name in bold indicates the player is registered during the mid-season transfer window.

Club	Player 1	Player 2	Player 3	Player 4	Player 5	Player 6 (Prime League)	Former
Balestier Khalsa	(Serbia) Emir Lotinac	(Serbia) Miroslav Kristic	(Croatia) Igor Cerina	(Croatia) Tarik Cmajcanin	(Serbia) Robert Peričić	-	-
(Brunei) DPMM FC	(Northern Ireland) Brian McLean	(Republic of Ireland) Joe Gamble	(Brazil) Rafael Ramazotti	(Portugal) Paulo Sérgio	(Bosnia and Herzegovina) Boris Raspudic	-	(England) Craig Fagan
(Singapore) Young Lions	(Canada) Sherif El-Masri	(Canada) Jordan Webb	-	-	-	-	-
Geylang International	(Japan) Yuki Ichikawa	(Japan) Kento Fukuda	(Japan) Tatsuro Inui	(Japan) Bruno Castanheira	(Slovakia) Jozef Kapláň	(England) Nathan Brown	-
Home United	(South Korea) Song Ui-young	(France) Sirina Camara	(Denmark) Ken Ilsø	(Algeria) Kamel Ramdani	(France) Ambroise Begue	-	-
Hougang United	(Japan) Kunihiro Yamashita	**(Japan) Atsushi Shimono**	**(Argentina) Carlos Alberto Delgado**	**(Brazil) Diego Gama de Oliveira**	**(Serbia) Vuk Sotirović**	(Japan) Yuki Uchiyama	(Japan) Takahashi Manato (Japan) Renshi Yamaguchi (Japan) Shunsuke Nakatake (Equatorial Guinea) Francisco Salvador Elá
Tampines Rovers	(Croatia) Mateo Roskam	(Croatia) Robert Alviž	(Brazil) Rodrigo Tosi	(Croatia) Predrag Počuča	**(Brazil) Rodrigo Pacheco**	(Australia) Naeem Rahimi	(Guadeloupe) Eddy Viator (Haiti) Fabrice Noel (Australia) Srećko Mitrović
Warriors FC	(England) Thomas Beattie	(Croatia) Marin Vidošević	(Bosnia and Herzegovina) Miroslav Pejić	(Argentina) Nicholas Velez	(Scotland) Kevin McCann	(Croatia) Karlo Ivancic	-

- Albirex Niigata (S) and Harimau Muda B are an all-Japanese and all-Malaysian team respectively and do not hire any foreigners.

== League table ==
Pos	Team	Pld	W	D	L	GF	GA	GD	Pts	Qualification
1	(Brunei) DPMM FC (Note: The three foreign clubs – Albirex Niigata (S), DPMM FC and Harimau Muda – as well as the Football Association of Singapore (FAS) under-23 team, Young Lions, are not eligible for any AFC competition spots.)	27	15	7	5	48	26	+22	52	
2	Tampines Rovers	27	14	6	7	42	25	+17	48	Qualification to AFC Champions League Qualifying Round 1 or AFC Cup Group Stage
3	(Japan) Albirex Niigata (S)	27	13	6	8	27	17	+10	45	
4	Balestier Khalsa	27	12	8	7	39	35	+4	44	Qualification to AFC Cup Group Stage
5	Warriors FC	27	11	4	12	40	51	−11	37	
6	Home United	27	9	9	9	38	34	+4	36	
7	(Malaysia) Harimau Muda B	27	9	6	12	29	40	−11	33	
8	Geylang International	27	7	7	13	36	44	−8	28	
9	(Singapore) Young Lions	27	7	6	14	30	43	−13	27	
10	Hougang United	27	4	9	14	28	42	−14	21	

Source: S.League
Rules for classification: 1) points; 2) goal difference; 3) number of goals scored; 4) number of wins

== Results ==
=== Round 1 ===
1 March 2015	Warriors FC	1 – 0	Balestier Khalsa	Kallang, Singapore
19:30 UTC+8		Details		Stadium: Jalan Besar Stadium

1 March 2015	DPMM FC	3 – 1	Harimau Muda	Bandar Seri Begawan, Brunei
20:15 UTC+8		Details		Stadium: Hassanal Bolkiah National Stadium

2 March 2015	Hougang United	1 – 1	Young Lions	Hougang, Singapore
19:30 UTC+8		Details		Stadium: Hougang Stadium

2 March 2015	Albirex Niigata (S)	0 – 1	Tampines Rovers	Jurong East, Singapore
19:30 UTC+8		Details		Stadium: Jurong East Stadium

3 March 2015	Geylang International	1 – 1	Home United	Bedok, Singapore
19:30 UTC+8		Details		Stadium: Bedok Stadium

5 March 2015	Tampines Rovers	1 – 0	Young Lions	Jurong West, Singapore
19:30 UTC+8		Details		Stadium: Jurong West Stadium

5 March 2015	Harimau Muda	1 – 3	Warriors FC	Malacca, Malaysia
20:00 UTC+8		Details		Stadium: Hang Jebat Stadium

6 March 2015	Balestier Khalsa	2 – 1	Geylang International	Toa Payoh, Singapore
19:30 UTC+8		Details		Stadium: Toa Payoh Stadium

6 March 2015	Hougang United	1 – 1	Home United	Kallang, Singapore
19:30 UTC+8		Details		Stadium: Jalan Besar Stadium

7 March 2015	DPMM FC	1 – 0	Albirex Niigata (S)	Bandar Seri Begawan, Brunei
20:15 UTC+8		Details		Stadium: Hassanal Bolkiah National Stadium

12 March 2015	Geylang International	0 – 0	Hougang United	Bedok, Singapore
19:30 UTC+8		Details		Stadium: Bedok Stadium

13 March 2015	Home United	2 – 0	Tampines Rovers	Kallang, Singapore
19:30 UTC+8		Details		Stadium: Jalan Besar Stadium

14 March 2015	Warriors FC	0 – 6	Albirex Niigata (S)	Woodlands, Singapore
19:30 UTC+8		Details		Stadium: Woodlands Stadium

18 March 2015	Tampines Rovers	2 – 0	Hougang United	Jurong West, Singapore
19:30 UTC+8		Details		Stadium: Jurong West Stadium

20 March 2015	Balestier Khalsa	0 – 1	Albirex Niigata (S)	Kallang, Singapore
19:30 UTC+8		Details		Stadium: Jalan Besar Stadium

21 March 2015	DPMM FC	2 – 2	Home United	Bandar Seri Begawan, Brunei
20:15 UTC+8		Details		Stadium: Hassanal Bolkiah National Stadium

3 April 2015	Geylang International	3 – 2	Tampines Rovers	Kallang, Singapore
20:00 UTC+8		Details		Stadium: Jalan Besar Stadium

3 April 2015	Harimau Muda	0 – 1	Albirex Niigata (S)	Malacca, Malaysia
20:00 UTC+8		Details		Stadium: Hang Jebat Stadium

4 April 2015	Balestier Khalsa	5 – 1	Young Lions	Toa Payoh, Singapore
19:30 UTC+8		Details		Stadium: Toa Payoh Stadium

4 April 2015	Hougang United	2 – 3	DPMM FC	Hougang, Singapore
20:30 UTC+8		Details		Stadium: Hougang Stadium

5 April 2015	Home United	1 – 4	Warriors FC	Yishun, Singapore
19:30 UTC+8		Details		Stadium: Yishun Stadium

8 April 2015	Home United	3 – 1	Balestier Khalsa	Yishun, Singapore
19:30 UTC+8		Details		Stadium: Yishun Stadium

8 April 2015	Albirex Niigata (S)	1 – 0	Geylang International	Jurong East, Singapore
19:30 UTC+8		Details		Stadium: Jurong East Stadium

9 April 2015	Warriors FC	1 – 0	Hougang United	Woodlands, Singapore
19:30 UTC+8		Details		Stadium: Woodlands Stadium

10 April 2015	Young Lions	0 – 1	Harimau Muda	Kallang, Singapore
19:30 UTC+8		Details		Stadium: Jalan Besar Stadium

15 April 2015	Albirex Niigata (S)	2 – 0	Young Lions	Jurong East, Singapore
19:50 UTC+8		Details		Stadium: Jurong East Stadium

16 April 2015	Geylang International	0 – 1	DPMM FC	Bedok, Singapore
19:30 UTC+8		Details		Stadium: Bedok Stadium

17 April 2015	Tampines Rovers	2 – 3	Warriors FC	Kallang, Singapore
19:30 UTC+8		Details		Stadium: Jalan Besar Stadium

17 April 2015	Harimau Muda	1 – 0	Home United	Malacca, Malaysia
20:00 UTC+8		Details		Stadium: Hang Jebat Stadium

18 April 2015	Hougang United	0 – 1	Balestier Khalsa	Hougang, Singapore
19:30 UTC+8		Details		Stadium: Hougang Stadium

20 April 2015	Young Lions	1 – 2	Warriors FC	Kallang, Singapore
19:30 UTC+8		Details		Stadium: Jalan Besar Stadium

20 April 2015	Harimau Muda	2 – 1	Geylang International	Malacca, Malaysia
20:00 UTC+8		Details		Stadium: Hang Jebat Stadium

22 April 2015	Home United	0 – 0	Albirex Niigata (S)	Yishun, Singapore
19:30 UTC+8		Details		Stadium: Yishun Stadium

22 April 2015	Balestier Khalsa	1 – 1	Tampines Rovers	Toa Payoh, Singapore
19:30 UTC+8		Details		Stadium: Toa Payoh Stadium

23 April 2015	Hougang United	3 – 3	Harimau Muda	Hougang, Singapore
19:30 UTC+8		Details		Stadium: Hougang Stadium

24 April 2015	Warriors FC	1 – 3	DPMM FC	Kallang, Singapore
19:30 UTC+8		Details		Stadium: Jalan Besar Stadium

28 April 2015	Home United	0 – 1	Young Lions	Yishun, Singapore
19:30 UTC+8		Details		Stadium: Yishun Stadium

1 May 2015	Albirex Niigata (S)	2 – 1	Hougang United	Kallang, Singapore
19:30 UTC+8		Details		Stadium: Jalan Besar Stadium

1 May 2015	DPMM FC	1 – 2	Balestier Khalsa	Bandar Seri Begawan, Brunei
20:15 UTC+8		Details		Stadium: Hassanal Bolkiah National Stadium

2 May 2015	Geylang International	3 – 1	Warriors FC	Bedok, Singapore
19:30 UTC+8		Details		Stadium: Bedok Stadium

6 May 2015	Tampines Rovers	0 – 0	Albirex Niigata (S)	Jurong West, Singapore
19:30 UTC+8		Details		Stadium: Jurong West Stadium

7 May 2015	Balestier Khalsa	1 – 2	Warriors	Toa Payoh, Singapore
19:30 UTC+8		Details		Stadium: Toa Payoh Stadium

8 May 2015	Home United	0 – 1	Geylang International	Kallang, Singapore
19:30 UTC+8		Details		Stadium: Jalan Besar Stadium

10 May 2015	DPMM FC	2 – 0	Tampines Rovers	Bandar Seri Begawan, Brunei
20:15 UTC+8		Details		Stadium: Hassanal Bolkiah National Stadium

=== Round 2 ===
14 May 2015	Home United	4 – 0	Hougang United	Yishun, Singapore
19:30 UTC+8		Details		Stadium: Yishun Stadium

14 May 2015	Albirex Niigata (S)	2 – 1	DPMM FC	Jurong East, Singapore
19:45 UTC+8		Details		Stadium: Jurong East Stadium

15 May 2015	Geylang International	2 – 2	Balestier Khalsa	Kallang, Singapore
19:30 UTC+8		Details		Stadium: Jalan Besar Stadium

17 May 2015	Tampines Rovers	3 – 0	Home United	Jurong West, Singapore
19:30 UTC+8		Details		Stadium: Jurong West Stadium

18 May 2015	Albirex Niigata (S)	0 – 4	Warriors FC	Jurong East, Singapore
19:30 UTC+8		Details		Stadium: Jurong East Stadium

19 May 2015	Hougang United	1 – 0	Geylang International	Hougang, Singapore
19:30 UTC+8		Details		Stadium: Hougang Stadium

20 July 2015	Young Lions	1 – 3	Hougang United	Kallang, Singapore
19:30 UTC+8		Details		Stadium: Jalan Besar Stadium

22 July 2015	Home United	0 – 0	DPMM FC	Yishun, Singapore
19:30 UTC+8		Details		Stadium: Yishun Stadium

23 July 2015	Albirex Niigata (S)	0 – 1	Balestier Khalsa	Jurong East, Singapore
19:30 UTC+8		Details		Stadium: Jurong East Stadium

23 July 2015	Warriors FC	0 – 2	Young Lions	Woodlands, Singapore
19:30 UTC+8		Details		Stadium: Woodlands Stadium

24 July 2015	Hougang United	0 – 3	Tampines Rovers	Hougang, Singapore
19:30 UTC+8		Details		Stadium: Hougang Stadium

24 July 2015	Geylang International	1 – 2	Harimau Muda	Kallang, Singapore
19:30 UTC+8		Details		Stadium: Jalan Besar Stadium

26 July 2015	Young Lions	1 – 1	DPMM FC	Kallang, Singapore
19:30 UTC+8		Details		Stadium: Jalan Besar Stadium

27 July 2015	Balestier Khalsa	2 – 0	Harimau Muda	Toa Payoh, Singapore
19:30 UTC+8		Details		Stadium: Toa Payoh Stadium

29 July 2015	Tampines Rovers	2 – 0	Geylang International	Jurong West, Singapore
19:30 UTC+8		Details		Stadium: Jurong West Stadium

29 July 2015	DPMM FC	1 – 1	Hougang United	Bandar Seri Begawan, Brunei
20:15 UTC+8		Details		Stadium: Hassanal Bolkiah National Stadium

30 July 2015	Warriors FC	2 – 2	Home United	Choa Chu Kang, Singapore
19:30 UTC+8		Details		Stadium: Choa Chu Kang Stadium

30 July 2015	Albirex Niigata (S)	0 – 1	Harimau Muda	Jurong East, Singapore
19:30 UTC+8		Details		Stadium: Jurong East Stadium

31 July 2015	Young Lions	2 – 2	Balestier Khalsa	Kallang, Singapore
19:30 UTC+8		Details		Stadium: Jalan Besar Stadium

1 August 2015	Tampines Rovers	1 – 1	DPMM FC	Jurong West, Singapore
19:30 UTC+8		Details		Stadium: Jurong West Stadium

2 August 2015	Geylang International	0 – 2	Albirex Niigata (S)	Bedok, Singapore
19:30 UTC+8		Details		Stadium: Bedok Stadium

3 August 2015	Balestier Khalsa	1 – 1	Home United	Toa Payoh, Singapore
19:30 UTC+8		Details		Stadium: Toa Payoh Stadium

3 August 2015	Harimau Muda	2 – 3	Young Lions	Malacca, Malaysia
20:00 UTC+8		Details		Stadium: Hang Jebat Stadium

4 August 2015	Hougang United	4 – 1	Warriors FC	Hougang, Singapore
19:30 UTC+8		Details		Stadium: Hougang Stadium

5 August 2015	DPMM FC	3 – 1	Geylang International	Bandar Seri Begawan, Brunei
20:15 UTC+8		Details		Stadium: Hassanal Bolkiah National Stadium

6 August 2015	Young Lions	0 – 1	Albirex Niigata (S)	Kallang, Singapore
19:30 UTC+8		Details		Stadium: Jalan Besar Stadium

6 August 2015	Home United	4 – 2	Harimau Muda	Yishun, Singapore
19:30 UTC+8		Details		Stadium: Yishun Stadium

7 August 2015	Balestier Khalsa	3 – 2	Hougang United	Kallang, Singapore
19:30 UTC+8		Details		Stadium: Jalan Besar Stadium

7 August 2015	Warriors FC	2 – 1	Tampines Rovers	Choa Chu Kang, Singapore
19:30 UTC+8		Details		Stadium: Choa Chu Kang Stadium

19 August 2015	Harimau Muda	0 – 1	Hougang United	Malacca, Malaysia
20:00 UTC+8		Details		Stadium: Hang Jebat Stadium

19 August 2015	DPMM FC	2 – 0	Warriors FC	Bandar Seri Begawan, Brunei
20:15 UTC+8		Details		Stadium: Hassanal Bolkiah National Stadium

20 August 2015	Geylang International	1 – 3	Young Lions	Bedok, Singapore
19:30 UTC+8		Details		Stadium: Bedok Stadium

20 August 2015	Albirex Niigata (S)	0 – 0	Home United	Jurong East, Singapore
19:30 UTC+8		Details		Stadium: Jurong East Stadium

21 August 2015	Tampines Rovers	0 – 0	Balestier Khalsa	Kallang, Singapore
19:30 UTC+8		Details		Stadium: Jalan Besar Stadium

23 August 2015	Warriors FC	0 – 2	Harimau Muda	Choa Chu Kang, Singapore
19:30 UTC+8		Details		Stadium: Choa Chu Kang Stadium

23 August 2015	DPMM FC	2 – 0	Young Lions	Bandar Seri Begawan, Brunei
20:15 UTC+8		Details		Stadium: Hassanal Bolkiah National Stadium

26 August 2015	Harimau Muda	0 – 1	Tampines Rovers	Malacca, Malaysia
20:00 UTC+8		Details		Stadium: Hang Jebat Stadium

27 August 2015	Young Lions	0 – 2	Home United	Kallang, Singapore
19:30 UTC+8		Details		Stadium: Jalan Besar Stadium

28 August 2015	Hougang United	1 – 1	Albirex Niigata (S)	Kallang, Singapore
19:30 UTC+8		Details		Stadium: Jalan Besar Stadium

29 August 2015	Warriors FC	1 – 1	Geylang International	Choa Chu Kang, Singapore
19:30 UTC+8		Details		Stadium: Choa Chu Kang Stadium

29 August 2015	Balestier Khalsa	2 – 1	DPMM FC	Toa Payoh, Singapore
19:30 UTC+8		Details		Stadium: Toa Payoh Stadium

12 September 2015	DPMM FC	2 – 0	Harimau Muda	Bandar Seri Begawan, Brunei
20:15 UTC+8		Details		Stadium: Hassanal Bolkiah National Stadium

13 September 2015	Warriors FC	4 – 2	Balestier Khalsa	Kallang, Singapore
19:30 UTC+8		Details		Stadium: Jalan Besar Stadium

15 September 2015	Tampines Rovers	5 – 1	Harimau Muda	Kallang, Singapore
19:30 UTC+8		Details		Stadium: Jalan Besar Stadium

16 September 2015	Albirex Niigata (S)	0 – 0	DPMM FC	Kallang, Singapore
19:30 UTC+8		Details		Stadium: Jalan Besar Stadium

17 September 2015	Hougang United	0 – 1	Home United	Kallang, Singapore
19:30 UTC+8		Details		Stadium: Jalan Besar Stadium

=== Round 3 ===
18 September 2015	Balestier Khalsa	2 – 2	Geylang International	Kallang, Singapore
19:30 UTC+8		Details		Stadium: Jalan Besar Stadium

19 September 2015	Tampines Rovers	0 – 1	Young Lions	Jurong West, Singapore
19:30 UTC+8		Details		Stadium: Jurong West Stadium

19 September 2015	Harimau Muda	2 – 2	Warriors FC	Malacca, Malaysia
20:00 UTC+8		Details		Stadium: Hang Jebat Stadium

22 September 2015	Young Lions	1 – 2	DPMM FC	Kallang, Singapore
19:30 UTC+8		Details		Stadium: Jalan Besar Stadium

22 September 2015	Balestier Khalsa	0 – 0	Harimau Muda	Toa Payoh, Singapore
19:30 UTC+8		Details		Stadium: Toa Payoh Stadium

27 September 2015	Young Lions	1 – 3	Tampines Rovers	Kallang, Singapore
19:30 UTC+8		Details		Stadium: Jalan Besar Stadium

27 September 2015	Harimau Muda	0 – 2	Balestier Khalsa	Malacca, Malaysia
20:00 UTC+8		Details		Stadium: Hang Jebat Stadium

1 October 2015	Hougang United	2 – 2	Young Lions	Hougang, Singapore
19:30 UTC+8		Details		Stadium: Hougang Stadium

4 October 2015	Young Lions	2 – 3	Geylang International	Kallang, Singapore
19:30 UTC+8		Details		Stadium: Jalan Besar Stadium

16 October 2015	Balestier Khalsa	1 – 0	Albirex Niigata (S)	Toa Payoh, Singapore
19:30 UTC+8		Details		Stadium: Toa Payoh Stadium

16 October 2015	Young Lions	2 – 1	Warriors FC	Kallang, Singapore
19:30 UTC+8		Details		Stadium: Jalan Besar Stadium

16 October 2015	Harimau Muda	2 – 0	Geylang International	Malacca, Malaysia
20:00 UTC+8		Details		Stadium: Hang Jebat Stadium

17 October 2015	Tampines Rovers	1 – 0	Hougang United	Jurong West, Singapore
19:30 UTC+8		Details		Stadium: Jurong West Stadium

17 October 2015	DPMM FC	4 – 4	Home United	Bandar Seri Begawan, Brunei
20:15 UTC+8		Details		Stadium: Hassanal Bolkiah National Stadium

19 October 2015	Balestier Khalsa	1 – 0	Young Lions	Toa Payoh, Singapore
19:30 UTC+8		Details		Stadium: Toa Payoh Stadium

19 October 2015	Harimau Muda	1 – 1	Albirex Niigata (S)	Malacca, Malaysia
20:00 UTC+8		Details		Stadium: Hang Jebat Stadium

20 October 2015	Hougang United	1 – 2	DPMM FC	Hougang, Singapore
19:30 UTC+8		Details		Stadium: Hougang Stadium

20 October 2015	Geylang International	1 – 4	Tampines Rovers	Bedok, Singapore
19:30 UTC+8		Details		Stadium: Bedok Stadium

21 October 2015	Home United	2 – 1	Warriors FC	Yishun, Singapore
19:30 UTC+8		Details		Stadium: Yishun Stadium

23 October 2015	Harimau Muda	0 – 2	DPMM FC	Malacca, Malaysia
20:00 UTC+8		Details		Stadium: Hang Jebat Stadium

26 October 2015	Home United	2 – 0	Balestier Khalsa	Yishun, Singapore
19:30 UTC+8		Details		Stadium: Yishun Stadium

26 October 2015	Albirex Niigata (S)	2 – 0	Geylang International	Jurong East, Singapore
19:30 UTC+8		Details		Stadium: Jurong East Stadium

26 October 2015	Warriors FC	2 – 0	Hougang United	Choa Chu Kang, Singapore
19:30 UTC+8		Details		Stadium: Choa Chu Kang Stadium

27 October 2015	Young Lions	1 – 1	Harimau Muda	Kallang, Singapore
19:30 UTC+8		Details		Stadium: Jalan Besar Stadium

28 October 2015	DPMM FC	0 – 1	Tampines Rovers	Bandar Seri Begawan, Brunei
20:15 UTC+8		Details		Stadium: Hassanal Bolkiah National Stadium

30 October 2015	Warriors FC	1 – 2	Albirex Niigata (S)	Choa Chu Kang, Singapore
19:30 UTC+8		Details		Stadium: Choa Chu Kang Stadium

30 October 2015	Geylang International	2 – 1	Home United	Kallang, Singapore
19:30 UTC+8		Details		Stadium: Jalan Besar Stadium

1 November 2015	Hougang United	1 – 1	Balestier Khalsa	Hougang, Singapore
19:30 UTC+8		Details		Stadium: Hougang Stadium

2 November 2015	Albirex Niigata (S)	0 – 1	Young Lions	Jurong East, Singapore
19:30 UTC+8		Details		Stadium: Jurong East Stadium

2 November 2015	Tampines Rovers	0 – 0	Warriors FC	Jurong West, Singapore
19:30 UTC+8		Details		Stadium: Jurong West Stadium

2 November 2015	Harimau Muda	1 – 0	Home United	Malacca, Malaysia
20:00 UTC+8		Details		Stadium: Hang Jebat Stadium

3 November 2015	Geylang International	2 – 1	DPMM FC	Bedok, Singapore
19:30 UTC+8		Details		Stadium: Bedok Stadium

5 November 2015	Home United	1 – 2	Albirex Niigata (S)	Yishun, Singapore
19:30 UTC+8		Details		Stadium: Yishun Stadium

5 November 2015	Balestier Khalsa	4 – 3	Tampines Rovers	Toa Payoh, Singapore
19:30 UTC+8		Details		Stadium: Toa Payoh Stadium

6 November 2015	Hougang United	1 – 2	Harimau Muda	Hougang, Singapore
19:30 UTC+8		Details		Stadium: Hougang Stadium

6 November 2015	Warriors FC	1 – 3	DPMM FC	Choa Chu Kang, Singapore
19:30 UTC+8		Details		Stadium: Choa Chu Kang Stadium

6 November 2015	Young Lions	2 – 2	Geylang International	Kallang, Singapore
19:30 UTC+8		Details		Stadium: Jalan Besar Stadium

8 November 2015	Home United	2 – 3	Tampines Rovers	Yishun, Singapore
19:30 UTC+8		Details		Stadium: Yishun Stadium

9 November 2015	Geylang International	2 – 2	Hougang United	Bedok, Singapore
19:30 UTC+8		Details		Stadium: Bedok Stadium

13 November 2015	Albirex Niigata (S)	0 – 1	Tampines Rovers	Jurong East, Singapore
19:30 UTC+8		Details		Stadium: Jurong East Stadium

15 November 2015	Home United	2 – 1	Young Lions	Yishun, Singapore
19:30 UTC+8		Details		Stadium: Yishun Stadium

20 November 2015	Geylang International	6 – 0	Warriors FC	Bedok, Singapore
19:30 UTC+8		Details		Stadium: Bedok Stadium

20 November 2015	Albirex Niigata (S)	1 – 0	Hougang United	Jurong East, Singapore
19:30 UTC+8		Details		Stadium: Jurong East Stadium

21 November 2015	Tampines Rovers	1 – 1	Harimau Muda	Jurong West, Singapore
20:15 UTC+8		Details		Stadium: Jurong West Stadium

21 November 2015	DPMM FC	4 – 0	Balestier Khalsa	Bandar Seri Begawan, Brunei
20:15 UTC+8		Details		Stadium: Hassanal Bolkiah National Stadium

== Statistics ==
=== Top scorers ===
As of match played 21 November 2015

Rank	Player	Club	Goals
1	(Brazil) Rafael Ramazotti	(Brunei) DPMM FC	21
2	Fazrul Nawaz	Warriors FC	18
3	(Croatia) Miroslav Kristic	Balestier Khalsa	16
4	(Brazil) Rodrigo Tosi	Tampines Rovers	14
5	(Croatia) Mateo Roskam	Warriors FC	13
6	(Slovakia) Jozef Kapláň	Geylang International	12
6	(Portugal) Paulo Sérgio	(Brunei) DPMM FC	12
6	(Japan) Bruno Castanheira	Geylang International	12
9	(Denmark) Ken Ilsø	Home United	11
10	(Croatia) Robert Peričić	Balestier Khalsa	9

=== Hat-tricks ===
Player	For	Against	Result	Date	Ref
(Brazil) Rafael Ramazotti	(Brunei) DPMM FC	(Malaysia) Harimau Muda B	3-1	1 March 2015	
(Brazil) Rodrigo Tosi	Tampines Rovers	(Malaysia) Harimau Muda B	5-1	15 September 2015	
(Japan) Bruno Castanheira	Geylang International	(Singapore) Young Lions	3-2	4 October 2015	
(Denmark) Ken Ilsø	Home United	(Brunei) DPMM FC	4-4	17 October 2015	

== S-League Awards Night Winners ==
Awards	Winners	Club
Player of the Year	(Japan) Fumiya Kogure	(Japan) Albirex Niigata (S)
Young Player of the Year	(Brunei) Azwan Ali	(Brunei) DPMM FC
Coach of the Year	(Scotland) Steve Kean	(Brunei) DPMM FC
Top Scorer Award	(Brazil) Rafael Ramazotti	(Brunei) DPMM FC
Fair Play Award	Geylang International	
Referee of the Year	Jansen Foo	
