= Manato (given name) =

- Gender: Male

Origin
- Origin: Japanese
- Meaning: Different meanings depending on the kanji used

Manato (written: 愛斗, 真人 or 真登) is a masculine Japanese given name. Notable people with the name include:

- Manato Shinada (品田 愛斗; born 1999), Japanese footballer
- Manato Takahashi (高橋 真登), Japanese footballer
- Manato Yamada (山田 真夏斗), Japanese footballer
