= Yuki Uchiyama =

Yuki Uchiyama may refer to:

- Yuki Uchiyama (artistic gymnast), Japanese artistic gymnast
- Yuki Uchiyama (footballer), Japanese footballer
