= Gregorio Salvador =

Gregorio Salvador may refer to:

- Gregorio Salvador Caja (born 1927), Spanish linguist
- Gregorio Manuel Salvador (born 1981), Equatoguinean football defender
