= Philippe Aw =

Singaporean footballer and coach

Personal information
- Full name: Philippe Aw Thiam Hor
- Date of birth: 1 January 1970 (age 56)
- Place of birth: Singapore
- Position: Winger

Senior career*
Years	Team	Apps	(Gls)
1998	Balestier Khalsa		
1999–2002	Home United		
2002–2006	Police FC		

Managerial career
- 2013–2014: Home United (Prime League)
- 2014–2016: Home United
- 2017–2018: Hougang United
- 2019: Singapore U15
- 2021: Young Lions
- 2022: Singapore (Technical Director)
- 2023: Young Lions
- 2023: Singapore U22
- * Club domestic league appearances and goals as of 11 July 2023

Philippe Aw Thiam Hor (born 1 January 1970) is a Singaporean football coach and former professional player who.

Aw mostly played as a winger and spent the majority of his professional career with Home United in the S.League.

== Early life ==
Aw started off in his youth experimenting with many different sports, initially focusing on badminton, before switching to football. He went to Toh Tuck Secondary School where he played football, before moving to join the school team of Chestnut Drive Secondary School after the former institute closed down. Aw subsequently joined and captained the school football team of Ngee Ann Polytechnic in his third year of tertiary education, leading them to the title of Inter-Varsity Polytechnic (IVP) champions that year. Under the recommendation of his teammate Lim Soon Seng, who at that time played for Tiong Bahru in the Singapore National Football League Division One, Aw joined the amateur league side for training and represented the team competitively.

== Club career ==
In 1998, after coaches P. N. Sivaji and Arasu, who managed Aw at Tiong Bahru, moved to join Balestier Khalsa, they brought him along and signed him on professional terms to play for the club. Aw made his debut the same year. The following year, after Aw had graduated from Ngee Ann Polytechnic, he joined Home United while serving in the Singapore Police Force for his mandatory national service. After staying with the club for four S.League seasons, Aw left to pursue his career as a full-time police officer, while playing for Police SA (now known as Lion City Sailors) in the Singapore National Football League, until he retired from football by the end of 2006.

== Coaching career ==
In 2007, at the offer of Home United's Prime League coach Bernard Lim following his resignation from his job as a police officer, Aw rejoined Home United in a youth coaching role at the club's Centre of Excellence, where he focused on growing the talent pool of young footballers. He served in that capacity for six years spanning from 2007 till the end of 2012. The following year, Aw served as the club's Prime League coach, guiding them to be crowned as the 2014 Prime League champions. Towards the end of 2014, Aw was offered the managerial role after his predecessor, South Korean manager Lee Lim-saeng had left.

Following Aw's induction as the manager of Home United, he set out to introduce an attractive brand of football, as well as promoting young players from the club's reserves to play for the senior team. In the 2015 S.League season, Aw promoted several youngsters from the club's youth academy to the first team, such as R. Aaravin, Shahrin Saberin and Sufianto Salleh.

On 8 April 2016, Aw was named by the Football Association of Singapore to lead the Singapore Selection side that would participate in the 2016 Sultan of Selangor Cup. Home United players such as Abdil Qaiyyim Mutalib and Azhar Sairudin were selected in the 18-men Singapore side, which also featured foreign S.League players including Ken Ilsø and Stipe Plazibat. The cup fixture eventually ended in a 1–1 (3–4 on penalties) win for the Singapore Selection side, despite Singapore defender Shahrin Saberin being sent off for a second yellow card in the 54th minute.

Head coach Philippe Aw has been relieved of his duties with immediate effect and Assistant coach Clement Teo has been installed as caretaker coach as reported by FOX Sports Asia in an article.

== Career statistics ==
=== Managerial ===
As of 01:57, 18 Sept 2021 (UTC)

Managerial record by team and tenure
Team	From	To	Record					Ref
Team	From	To	P	W	D	L	Win %	Ref
Home United	5 December 2014	30 July 2016	55	21	14	20	38.2	
Hougang United	1 January 2017	10 June 2018	43	12	10	21	27.9	
Singapore U-16	17 January 2019		10	2	1	7	20.0	
Young Lions FC	1 January 2021		19	3	4	12	15.8	
Total			121	36	29	56	29.8	—

Managerial record by team, season and competition
Team	Season	Competition	Record					Ref
Team	Season	Competition	P	W	D	L	Win %	Ref
Home United	2015	S.League	27	9	9	9	33.3	
Home United	2015	Singapore Cup	5	3	0	2	60.0	
Home United	2015	Singapore League Cup	2	1	0	1	50.0	
Home United	2016	S.League	16	6	4	6	37.5	
Home United	2016	Singapore Cup	3	1	1	1	33.3	
Home United	2016	Singapore League Cup	2	1	0	1	50.0	
Total			55	21	14	20	38.2	—

== Honours ==
=== Player ===
==== Club ====
===== Home United =====
- S.League
  - Winner: 1999
- Singapore Cup
  - Winner: 2000, 2001

=== Manager ===
==== Club ====
===== Home United =====
- Singapore Cup
  - Runner-up: 2015
- Prime League
  - Winner: 2014

==== International ====
- Sultan of Selangor Cup
  - Winner: 2016
