= Župarić =

Župarić is a Croatian surname. Notable people with the surname include:

- Dario Župarić (born 1992), Croatian footballer
- Đurica Župarić (born 1984), Croatian footballer
