= CD Vera =

CD Vera may refer to:

- CD Vera (Tenerife), Spanish football club based in Puerto de la Cruz, Canary Islands
- CD Vera de Almería, Spanish football club based in Vera, Andalusia
