= Dario Serra =

Spanish footballer (born 2003)

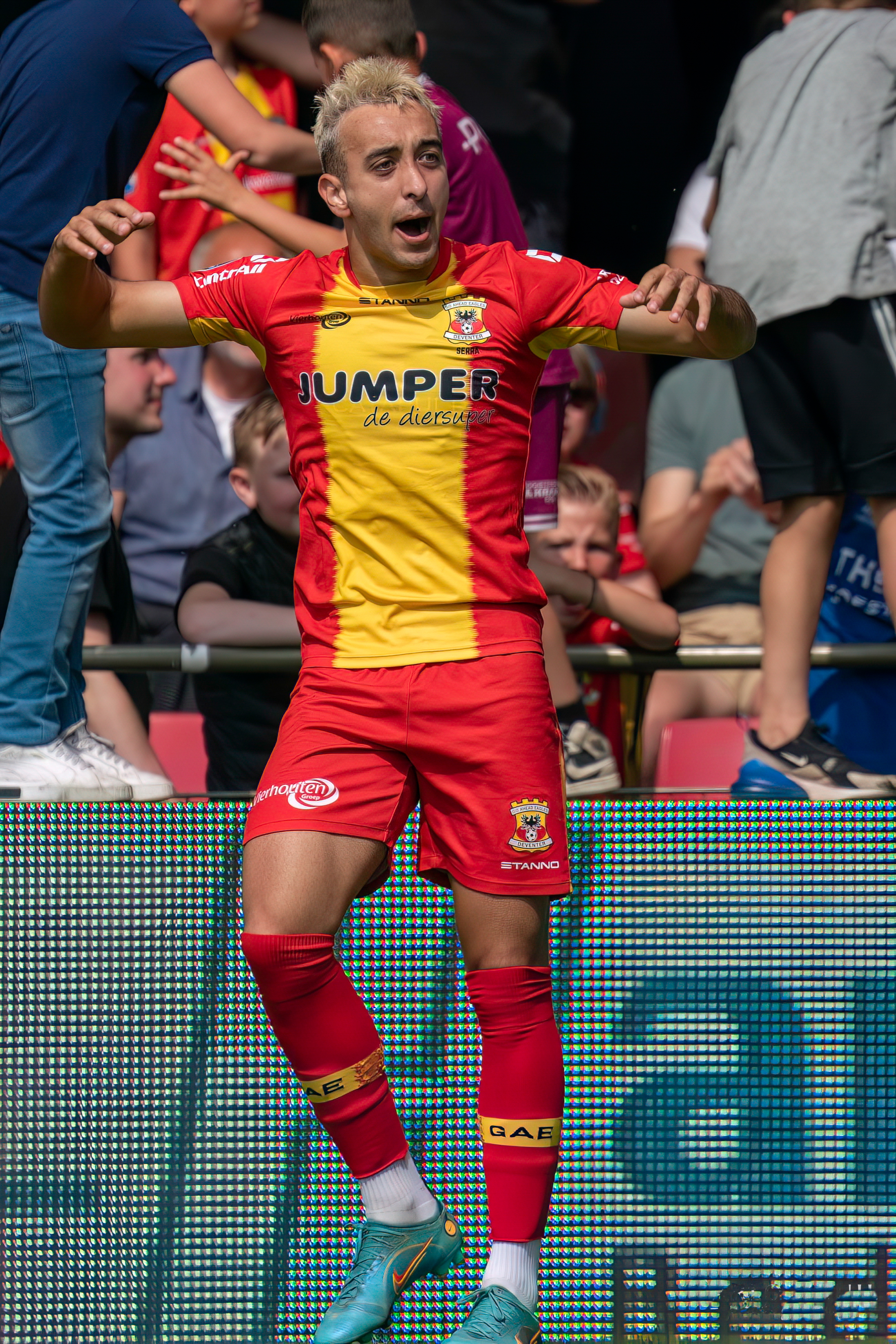
- Serra with Go Ahead Eagles in 2023

Personal information
- Full name: Dario Serra Alvarez
- Date of birth: 20 January 2003 (age 23)
- Place of birth: Vera, Spain
- Height: 1.80 m (5 ft 11 in)
- Positions: Left winger; left midfielder

Team information
- Current team: Kustošija

Youth career
- 2011–2014: Vera
- 2014–2017: Almería
- 2017–2021: Valencia

Senior career*
Years	Team	Apps	(Gls)
2021–2023	Valencia Mestalla	3	(0)
2023	→ Go Ahead Eagles (loan)	3	(1)
2023–2024	Go Ahead Eagles	0	(0)
2024	→ Mérida (loan)	2	(0)
2024–2025	Vukovar 1991	23	(5)
2025–	Kustošija	2	(2)
- * Club domestic league appearances and goals as of 26 May 2026

Dario Serra Alvarez (born 20 January 2003) is a Spanish professional footballer who plays as left winger or left midfielder for Croatian club Kustošija of the Croatian Second Football League.

== Early and personal life ==
Serra was born and raised in Vera, Almeria in Andalusia.

== Career ==
Serra played youth football for CD Vera and UD Almería prior to joining Valencia CF in 2017.

=== Valencia ===
Part of a successful Valencia CF youth side, Serra signed a professional contract with Valencia lasting until 2024, with the option of another season. In January 2023, Serra joined Eredivisie side Go Ahead Eagles on a six-month loan deal in order to try and gain some first team experience.

=== Go Ahead Eagles ===
On 7 May 2023, he made his league debut for Go Ahead Eagles in the Eredivisie against FC Groningen. On 21 May 2023, he scored his first senior league goal, for Go Ahead Eagles, at the Adelaarshorst Stadion against FC Volendam.

On 1 July 2023, Go Ahead Eagles exercised their option-to-buy, and Serra signed a three-year contract with the club.

During the 2023–24 season, Serra played only one match for Go Ahead Eagles in which he came on as a substitute during their KNVB Cup match against Royal HFC.

On 13 August 2024, Serra left Go Ahead Eagles by mutual consent.

==== Loan to Mérida ====
On 26 January 2024, Serra returned to Spain and joined Mérida on loan.

=== HNK Vukovar 1991 ===
In 2024, he signed for Croatian club HNK Vukovar 1991. He made his debut for the club against NK Jarun Zagreb on 6 October 2024, appearing as a half-time substitute in a 1–1 draw in the Croatian First Football League. He scored his first goal for the club against NK Zrinski Jurjevac on 2 November 2024, in a 3–1 away league win.

== Career statistics ==
As of match played 1 June 2025

Appearances and goals by club, season and competition
Club	Season	League			Cup		Europe		Total	
Club	Season	Division	Apps	Goals	Apps	Goals	Apps	Goals	Apps	Goals
Valencia B	2021–22	Segunda Federación	1	0	—		—		1	0
Valencia B	2022–23	Segunda Federación	2	0	—		—		2	0
Valencia B	Total		3	0	—		—		3	0
Go Ahead Eagles (loan)	2022–23	Eredivisie	3	1	0	0	—		3	1
Go Ahead Eagles	2023–24	Eredivisie	0	0	1	0	—		1	0
Go Ahead Eagles	2024–25	Eredivisie	0	0	0	0	0	0	0	0
Go Ahead Eagles	Total		0	0	1	0	0	0	1	0
Mérida (loan)	2023–24	Primera Federación	2	0	—		—		2	0
Vukovar 1991	2024–25	Croatian Football League	23	5	—		—		23	5
Vukovar 1991	2025–26	Croatian Football League	0	0	0	0	—		0	0
Vukovar 1991	Total		23	5	0	0	—		0	0
Career total			31	6	1	0	0	0	32	6
