= 2019 All Japan High School Soccer Tournament =

Tournament details
- Country: Japan
- Dates: 30 December 2019 – 13 January 2020
- Teams: 48

Final positions
- Champions: Shizuoka Gakuen (2nd title)
- Runner-up: Aomori Yamada

Tournament statistics
- Matches played: 47
- Goals scored: 131 (2.79 per match)
- Top goal scorer(s): Yuki Iwamoto (Aomori Yamada); Yuma Mori (Yokkaichi Chuo) (5 goals each)

The 2019 All Japan High School Soccer Tournament (All Japan JFA 98th High School Soccer Tournament (Japanese: 第98回全国高等学校サッカー選手権大会)) marked the 98th edition of the referred annually contested cup for High Schools over Japan. As usual, the tournament was contested by 48 High Schools, with 1 High School per Prefecture being qualified for the tournament, with an exception made for the Tokyo, which had 2 High Schools representing their Prefecture. The final was played at the Saitama Stadium 2002.

The Shizuoka Gakuen won the tournament over Aomori Yamada by 3–2.

== Calendar ==
The tournament took place in a 15-day span, with the tournament split in a total of 6 stages.

Round	Date	Matches	Clubs
First round	30–31 December 2019	16	32 (32) → 16
Second round	2 January 2020	16	32 (16+16) → 16
Third round	3 January 2020	8	16 → 8
Quarter-finals	5 January 2020	4	8 → 4
Semi-finals	11 January 2020	2	4 → 2
Final	13 January 2020	1	2 → 1

== Venues ==
The tournament was played in four prefectures and nine stadiums, with six (two for each prefecture) located in Chiba, Kanagawa, and Tokyo Prefectures, and three located in Saitama. They are:

- Tokyo – Ajinomoto Field Nishigaoka, and Komazawa Olympic Park Stadium
- Saitama – Saitama Stadium 2002, Urawa Komaba Stadium and NACK5 Stadium Omiya
- Kanagawa – NHK Spring Mitsuzawa Football Stadium and Kawasaki Todoroki Stadium
- Chiba – Fukuda Denshi Arena and ZA Oripri Stadium

== Participating clubs ==
In parentheses: the amount of times each team qualified for the All Japan High School Tournament (appearance in the 2020 edition included)

Hokkaido: Hokkai High School (10); Aomori: Aomori Yamada High School (25); Iwate: Senshu Univ. Kitakami High School (1); Miyagi: Sendai Ikuei Gakuen High School (34); Akita: Akita Shogyo High School (45); Yamagata: Yamagata Chuo High School (12); Fukushima: Shoshi High School (11); Ibaraki: Meishu Gakuen Hitachi High School (4); Tochigi: Yaita Chuo High School (10); Gunma: Maebashi Ikuei High School (23); Saitama: Shohei High School (3); Chiba: Ichiritsu Funabashi High School (22); Tokyo A: Higashikurume Sogo High School (3); Tokyo B: Kokugakuin Univ. Kugayama High School (8); Kanagawa: Nihon Univ. Fujisawa High School (5); Yamanashi: Nihon Univ. Meisei High School (1); Nagano: Matsumoto Kokusai High School (3); Niigata: Teikyo Nagaoka High School (7); Toyama: Toyama Daiichi High School (30); Ishikawa: Otori Gakuin High School (2); Fukui: Maruoka High School (30); Shizuoka: Shizuoka Gakuen High School (12); Aichi: Aichi Inst. of Technology Meiden High School (1); Mie: Yokkaichi Chuo High School (34)	Gifu: Teikyo Univ. Kani High School (6); Shiga: Kusatsu Higashi High School (11); Kyoto: Kyoto Tachibana High School (8); Osaka: Kokoku High School (1); Hyōgo: Kobe Koryo Gakuen High School (10); Nara: Gojo High School (1); Wakayama: Wakayama Kogyo High School (4); Tottori: Yonago Kita High School (15); Shimane: Rissho Univ. Shonan High School (18); Okayama: Okayama Gakugeikan High School (3); Hiroshima: Hiroshima Minami High School (15); Yamaguchi: Takagawa Gakuen High School (25); Kagawa: Otemae Takamatsu High School (1); Tokushima: Tokushima Ichiritsu High School (17); Ehime: Imabari Higashi High School (1); Kōchi: Kochi High School (16); Fukuoka: Chikuyo Gakuen High School (3); Saga: Ryukoku High School (2); Nagasaki: Nagasaki IAS High School (1); Kumamoto: Kumamoto Kokufu High School (3); Ōita: Oita High School (11); Miyazaki: Nissho Gakuen High School (15); Kagoshima: Kamimura Gakuen High School (7); Okinawa: Maehara High School (3)

== Schedule ==
The schedule and the match pairings were confirmed on 18 November 2019.

=== First round ===
30 December 2019	Kokugakuin Kugayama	8−0	Maehara	Setagaya
14:05	Takayuki Yamashita 6', 11', 52'; Koki Yamamoto 23', 60', 70'; Hayato Tosaka 64'; Daisuke Kawahara 66'	Report (JFA); Report (JFA)		Stadium: Komazawa Olympic Park Stadium; Attendance: 13,949; Referee: Shoichiro Mikami

31 December 2019	Toyama Daiichi	2−2 (4–3 p)	Rissho Shonan	Saitama
14:10	Own goal 58' (o.g.); Shosei Usui 78'	Report (JFA); Report (JFA)	Own goal 32' (o.g.); Kakeru Banki 67'	Stadium: Urawa Komaba Stadium; Attendance: 8,455; Referee: Kentaro Uematsu
	Penalties
	Toshiki Takagi (penalty scored); Kota Sanada (penalty scored); Shosei Usui (penalty missed); Ryoka Suzuki (penalty scored); Ren Yoshifuji (penalty scored)		(penalty scored) Kakeru Banki; (penalty scored) Ryunosuke Sawada; (penalty missed) Manato Yamada; (penalty scored) Musashi Osako; (penalty missed) Katsuyuki Ishibashi

31 December 2019	Maebashi Ikuei	0−0 (4–5 p)	Kamimura Gakuen	Saitama
12:05		Report (JFA); Report (JFA)		Stadium: Urawa Komaba Stadium; Attendance: 11,090; Referee: Tomohiro Ota
	Penalties
	Ryo Kurihara (penalty scored); Ryota Yamada (penalty scored); Fuki Yamagishi (penalty scored); Ryohei Watanabe (penalty missed); Taiki Aihara (penalty scored); Takeru Kuramata (penalty missed)		(penalty scored) Kodai Jikumaru; (penalty scored) Riku Nakashima; (penalty scored) Yuya Hamaya; (penalty missed) Koitaro Hiwatashi; (penalty scored) Koki Nobe; (penalty scored) Katsuhito Narutomi

31 December 2019	Senshu Kitakami	3−1	Ryukoku	Saitama
14:10	Riku Kikuchi 15'; Akihito Abe 21', 30'	Report (JFA); Report (JFA)	Keishi Ishibashi 67'	Stadium: NACK5 Stadium Omiya; Attendance: 2,713; Referee: Shota Uchiyama

31 December 2019	Akita Shogyo	2−3	Kobe Koryo Gakuen	Yokohama
14:10	Ayuki Sasahara 29'; Haruto Harata 34'	Report (JFA); Report (JFA)	Naru Tokuhiro 23'; Taimu Okiyoshi 51'; Shido Tanaka 55'	Stadium: NHK Spring Mitsuzawa Football Stadium; Attendance: 6,006; Referee: Yusuke Ohashi

31 December 2019	Meishi Gakuen Hitachi	1−0	Kochi	Yokohama
12:05	Koya Hasegawa 16'	Report (JFA); Report (JFA)		Stadium: NHK Spring Mitsuzawa Football Stadium; Attendance: 3,810; Referee: Kohei Yano

31 December 2019	Sendai Ikuei Gakuen	1−1 (3–0 p)	Gojo	Kawasaki
12:05	Ryo Sato 58'	Report (JFA); Report (JFA)	Kohei Sugata 45'	Stadium: Kawasaki Todoroki Stadium; Attendance: 2,789; Referee: Yoshikazu Matsuzawa
	Penalties
	Kiina Sugita (penalty scored); Hirokazu Watanabe (penalty scored); Ren Yamaguchi (penalty scored)		(penalty missed) Tatsuya Ikeda; (penalty missed) Yu Izawa; (penalty missed) Yuki Yonekawa

31 December 2019	Hokkai	0−1	Takagawa Gakuen	Kawasaki
14:10		Report (JFA); Report (JFA)	Yuya Uchida 49'	Stadium: Kawasaki Todoroki Stadium; Attendance: 3,570; Referee: Yasuyuki Matsumoto

31 December 2019	Higashikurume Sogo	2−4	Kusatsu Higashi	Kita
12:05	Shoya Matsuyama 53'; Akiharu Yanagida 64'	Report (JFA); Report (JFA)	Sota Watanabe 4', 31'; Own goal 19'; Arata Kozakai 80'	Stadium: Ajinomoto Field Nishigaoka; Attendance: 5,823; Referee: Yuzo Sutani

31 December 2019	AKU Meiden	0−1	Chikuyo Gakuen	Saitama
12:05		Report (JFA); Report (JFA)	Takumi Iwasaki 40+3'	Stadium: NACK5 Stadium Omiya; Attendance: 4,769; Referee: Koki Nagamine

31 December 2019	Maruoka	3−2	Nagasaki IAS	Setagaya
14:10	Eisu Kawakami 36', 79'; Neo Tagai 76'	Report (JFA); Report (JFA)	Tsubasa Chiba 8'; Fuga Beppu 68'	Stadium: Komazawa Olympic Park Stadium; Attendance: 9,323; Referee: Takuya Ujihara

31 December 2019	Shizuoka Gakuen	6−0	Okayama Gakugeikan	Setagaya
12:05	Kazuaki Ihori 29', 46', 51'; Naoki Koyama 34'; Yuki Iwamoto 77'; Yusuke Kusanagi 80+3'	Report (JFA); Report (JFA)		Stadium: Komazawa Olympic Park Stadium; Attendance: 8,615; Referee: Reo Tanaka

31 December 2019	Yaita Chuo	2−2 (6–5 p)	Oita	Ichihara
12:05	Keisuke Tada 4'; Shuto Sago 47'	Report (JFA); Report (JFA)	Yuta Moriyama 59'; Sota Ogami 67'	Stadium: ZA Oripri Stadium; Attendance: 1,871; Referee: Sho Kawamata
	Penalties
	Shuto Sago (penalty scored); Sota Kato (penalty scored); Musashi Hisanaga (penalty scored); Kenshiro Tsurumi (penalty scored); Kosuke Nagae (penalty scored); Ibuki Yano (penalty missed); Kota Hattori (penalty scored)		(penalty scored) Kyosei Nagamatsu; (penalty scored) Komei Kikuchi; (penalty scored) Yuta Moriyama; (penalty scored) Sota Ogami; (penalty scored) Masato Shigemi; (penalty missed) Yoshiki Sato; (penalty missed) Yu Taketani

31 December 2019	Teikyo Kani	0−1	Otemae Takamatsu	Ichihara
14:10		Report (JFA); Report (JFA)	Masatora Tanimoto 52'	Stadium: ZA Oripri Stadium; Attendance: 2,482; Referee: Tatsuya Sakai

31 December 2019	Matsumoto Kokusai	1−0	Wakayama Kogyo	Chiba
14:10	Jotaro Kobayashi 58'	Report (JFA); Report (JFA)		Stadium: Fukuda Denshi Arena; Attendance: 2,459; Referee: Takafumi Mikuriya

31 December 2019	Nihon Meisei	1−3	Yokkaichi Chuo	Chiba
12:05	Yasutomo Saito 35'	Report (JFA); Report (JFA)	Yuya Taguchi 5'; Yuma Mori 13', 47'	Stadium: Fukuda Denshi Arena; Attendance: 4,784; Referee: Naofumi Chiba

=== Second round ===
2 January 2020	Aomori Yamada	6−0	Yaita Chuo	Saitama
12:05	Kuryu Matsuki 36'; Hidetoshi Takeda 41', 80+4'; Yusei Kanda 60'; Shota Tanaka 62'; Kenta Goto 68'	Report (JFA); Report (JFA)		Stadium: NACK5 Stadium Omiya; Attendance: 7,862; Referee: Chihiro Tsukada

2 January 2020	Toyama Daiichi	1−0	Kamimura Gakuen	Saitama
14:10	Isuke Maruyama 16'	Report (JFA); Report (JFA)		Stadium: Urawa Komaba Stadium; Attendance: 10,607; Referee: Naoto Uehara

2 January 2020	Senshu Kitakami	0–0 (5–6 p)	Kokugakuin Kugayama	Saitama
14:10		Report (JFA); Report (JFA)		Stadium: NACK5 Stadium Omiya; Attendance: 6,924; Referee: Shingo Kuniyoshi
	Penalties
	Arata Sugawara (penalty scored); Renya Iwabuchi (penalty scored); Ryusei Fukuura (penalty missed); Shuga Okamoto (penalty scored); Shuto Abe (penalty scored); Seiya Segawa (penalty scored); Haruto Nasu (penalty missed)		(penalty scored) Hayato Tosaka; (penalty scored) Koki Yamamoto; (penalty scored) Sasagu Yamamoto; (penalty scored) Kazutoshi Fukui; (penalty missed) Daisuke Kawahara; (penalty scored) Daisuke Kiyoi; (penalty scored) Takeru Murakami

2 January 2020	Shohei	2−0	Kokoku	Saitama
12:05	Naoki Suto 46'; Hiromu Kamada 51'	Report (JFA); Report (JFA)		Stadium: Urawa Komaba Stadium; Attendance: 14,741; Referee: Taiki Tsuruoka

2 January 2020	Teikyo Nagaoka	3−0	Kumamoto Kokufu	Yokohama
14:10	Katsuyuki Tanaka 19'; Teppei Yachida 25'; Misaki Haruyama 68'	Report (JFA); Report (JFA)		Stadium: NHK Spring Mitsuzawa Football Stadium; Attendance: 4,406; Referee: Yasuhiro Udagawa

2 January 2020	Kobe Koryo Gakuen	3−2	Meishu Gakuen Hitachi	Yokohama
12:05	Taimu Okiyoshi 14', 73'; Shunki Matsuno 44'	Report (JFA); Report (JFA)	Rio Nemoto 52', 80+3'	Stadium: NHK Spring Mitsuzawa Football Stadium; Attendance: 3,300; Referee: Keisuke Kasuya

2 January 2020	Sendai Ikuei Gakuen	1−0	Takagawa Gakuen	Kawasaki
14:10	Kenta Yoshida 72'	Report (JFA); Report (JFA)		Stadium: Kawasaki Todoroki Stadium; Attendance: 7,959; Referee: Nozomi Osada

2 January 2020	Nihon Fujisawa	3−1	Hiroshima Minami	Kawasaki
12:05	Makiya Narisada 14'; Takeshi Yoshimoto 20'; Naoki Hirata 70'	Report (JFA); Report (JFA)	Takumi Okamoto 45'	Stadium: Kawasaki Todoroki Stadium; Attendance: 6,964; Referee: Takeshi Tsukahara

2 January 2020	Shoshi	0−0 (3–4 p)	Tokushima Ichiritsu	Setagaya
14:10		Report (JFA); Report (JFA)		Stadium: Komazawa Olympic Park Stadium; Attendance: 7,166; Referee: Kei Suzuki
	Penalties
	Sora Yamauchi (penalty scored); Susumu Yoshida (penalty scored); Koyo Watanabe (penalty scored); Rikuto Koike (penalty missed); Kazuki Sato (penalty missed)		(penalty scored) Natsuki Abe; (penalty missed) Taiyo Kawahito; (penalty scored) Renta Noguchi; (penalty scored) Yuto Taira; (penalty scored) Yuki Tauchi

2 January 2020	Kusatsu Higashi	1−2	Chikuyo Gakuen	Kita
12:05	Sota Watanabe 25'	Report (JFA); Report (JFA)	Kotaro Kano 39'; Hikaru Imada 77'	Stadium: Ajinomoto Field Nishigaoka; Attendance: 1,949; Referee: Shuhei Ishimaru

2 January 2020	Maruoka	0−3	Shizuoka Gakuen	Setagaya
12:05		Report (JFA); Report (JFA)	Naoki Koyama 2', 40+2'; Yuki Iwamoto 62'	Stadium: Komazawa Olympic Park Stadium; Attendance: 5,741; Referee: Yuichi Hanakawa

2 January 2020	Yamagata Chuo	0−2	Imabari Higashi	Kita
14:10		Report (JFA); Report (JFA)	Taisei Takase 24', 55'	Stadium: Ajinomoto Field Nishigaoka; Attendance: 2,726; Referee: Yoshimi Yamashita

2 January 2020	Otori Gakuin	1−1 (4–3 p)	Kyoto Tachibana	Ichihara
12:05	Kenta Sakamoto 80'	Report (JFA); Report (JFA)	Towa Matsumoto 54'	Stadium: ZA Oripri Stadium; Attendance: 1,381; Referee: Hiro Takahashi
	Penalties
	Reo Kawamura (penalty missed); Reiki Suzuki (penalty scored); Seiya Tomikawa (penalty scored); Shuki Ushiyachi (penalty scored); Seria Sudo (penalty scored)		(penalty missed) Yota Sato; (penalty missed) Koya Nakano; (penalty scored) Taiyo Nishino; (penalty scored) Taiki Takaki; (penalty scored) Shuto Umemura

2 January 2020	Yaita Chuo	2−1	Otemae Takamatsu	Ichihara
14:10	Kenshiro Tsurumi 32'; Shuto Sago 55'	Report (JFA); Report (JFA)	Ryota Katakami 38'	Stadium: ZA Oripri Stadium; Attendance: 2,042; Referee: Kazuya Miyahara

2 January 2020	Matsumoto Kokusai	1−2	Yokkaichi Chuo	Chiba
12:05	Shotaro Kobayashi 20'	Report (JFA); Report (JFA)	Yuya Taguchi 42'; Yuma Mori 66'	Stadium: Fukuda Denshi Arena; Attendance: 5,202; Referee: Toshiki Tomomasa

2 January 2020	Nissho Gakuen	0−0 (7–6 p)	Ichiritsu Funabashi	Chiba
12:05		Report (JFA); Report (JFA)		Stadium: Fukuda Denshi Arena; Attendance: 11,214; Referee: Hiroki Murata
	Penalties
	Yosuke Suzuki (penalty scored); Ryota Abe (penalty scored); Shuta Nakabeppu (penalty scored); Kakeru Goto (penalty scored); Reon Kiwaki (penalty scored); Haruku Yoshioka (penalty scored); Rin Hamamatsu (penalty scored)		(penalty scored) Kento Uematsu; (penalty scored) Yuito Suzuki; (penalty scored) Travis Takahashi; (penalty scored) Eiki Mori; (penalty scored) Kento Sakuma; (penalty scored) So Nakamura; (penalty missed) Koki Matsuya

=== Round of 16 ===
3 January 2020	Aomori Yamada	4−1	Toyama Daiichi	Saitama
14:10	Kuryu Matsuki 7', 75'; Shota Tanaka 44'; Yusei Kanda 59'	Report (JFA); Report (JFA)	Kensuke Yazaki 69'	Stadium: Urawa Komaba Stadium; Attendance: 15,498; Referee: Tatsuya Sakai

3 January 2020	Kokugakuin Kugayama	0−1	Shohei	Saitama
12:05		Report (JFA); Report (JFA)	Daiki Shimoda 80+2'	Stadium: Urawa Komaba Stadium; Attendance: 15,820; Referee: Kazuyoshi Karashima

3 January 2020	Teikyo Nagaoka	5−0	Kobe Koryo Gakuen	Kawasaki
12:05	Gakuto Yaoita 46'; Misaki Haruyama 55', 75', 79'; Kotatsu Kawakami 74'	Report (JFA); Report (JFA)		Stadium: Kawasaki Todoroki Stadium; Attendance: 4,897; Referee: Oki Matsumoto

3 January 2020	Sendai Ikuei Gakuen	0−0 (9–8 p)	Nihon Fujisawa	Kawasaki
14:10		Report (JFA); Report (JFA)		Stadium: Kawasaki Todoroki Stadium; Attendance: 7,961; Referee: Takafumi Mikuriya
	Penalties
	Kiina Sugita (penalty scored); Hirokazu Watanabe (penalty scored); Ren Yamaguchi (penalty scored); Hiroto Toyokura (penalty scored); Riku Nakayama (penalty scored); Kenta Yoshida (penalty scored); Kazuki Kakuta (penalty scored); Itsuki Nakagawara (penalty missed); Kazuki Akashi (penalty scored); Rei Shimano (penalty scored)		Hiroto Uemura (penalty scored); Takeshi Yoshimoto (penalty scored); Natsu Saito (penalty scored); Yuma Igari (penalty scored); Hayato Aoki (penalty scored); Tomu Nunokata (penalty scored); Ayuki Miyakawa (penalty scored); Riku Furuya (penalty missed); Naoki Hirata (penalty scored); Hayato Ueki (penalty missed)

3 January 2020	Tokushima Ichiritsu	1−0	Chikuyo Gakuen	Setagaya
14:10	Raishin Mikura 22'	Report (JFA); Report (JFA)		Stadium: Komazawa Olympic Park Stadium; Attendance: 5,745; Referee: Satoshi Michiyama

3 January 2020	Shizuoka Gakuen	2−0	Imabari Higashi	Setagaya
12:05	Ren Asakura 4'; Naoki Koyama 47'	Report (JFA); Report (JFA)		Stadium: Komazawa Olympic Park Stadium; Attendance: 5,105; Referee: Shinya Sasaki

3 January 2020	Otori Gakuen	0−2	Yaita Chuo	Chiba
14:10		Report (JFA); Report (JFA)	Aomi Nishimura 14'; Shuto Sago 77'	Stadium: Fukuda Denshi Arena; Attendance: 2,251; Referee: Masashi Harada

3 January 2020	Yokkaichi Chuo	3−3 (4–3 p)	Nissho Gakuen	Chiba
12:05	Yuma Mori 11', 56'; Yuichi Miyaki 53'	Report (JFA); Report (JFA)	Yosuke Suzuki 46', 58'; Reon Kiwaki 50'	Stadium: Fukuda Denshi Arena; Attendance: 3,528; Referee: Masashi Kuniyoshi
	Penalties
	Yuma Mori (penalty scored); Shuta Kanegae (penalty missed); Aiki Wada (penalty scored); Masaya Hongo (penalty scored); Futo Nagasaki (penalty scored)		Yosuke Suzuki (penalty scored); Ryota Abe (penalty scored); Shuta Nakabeppu (penalty scored); Kakeru Goto (penalty missed); Reon Kiwaki (penalty missed)

=== Quarter-finals ===
5 January 2020	Aomori Yamada	3−2	Shohei	Kawasaki
12:05	Rukia Urakawa 10'; Kenta Goto 19'; Hidetoshi Takeda 40+2'	Report (JFA); Report (JFA)	Naoki Suto 49'; Taiyo Yamauchi 75'	Stadium: Kawasaki Todoroki Stadium; Attendance: 15,068; Referee: Shuhei Ishimaru

5 January 2020	Teikyo Nagaoka	1−0	Sendai Ikuei Gakuen	Kawasaki
14:10	Teppei Yachida 1'	Report (JFA); Report (JFA)		Stadium: Kawasaki Todoroki Stadium; Attendance: 16,399; Referee: Koki Nagamine

5 January 2020	Tokushima Ichiritsu	0−4	Shizuoka Gakuen	Setagaya
14:10		Report (JFA); Report (JFA)	Kento Abe 16'; Yuki Iwamoto 22', 40', 70'	Stadium: Komazawa Olympic Park Stadium; Attendance: 8,958; Referee: Takuya Ujihara

5 January 2020	Yaita Chuo	2−0	Yokkaichi Chuo	Setagaya
12:05	Keisuke Tada 12', 20'	Report (JFA); Report (JFA)		Stadium: Komazawa Olympic Park Stadium; Attendance: 6,189; Referee: Reo Tanaka

=== Semi-finals ===
11 January 2020	Aomori Yamada	2−1	Teikyo Nagaoka	Saitama
12:05	Shota Tanaka 16'; Kuryu Matsuki 47'	Report (JFA); Report (JFA)	Katsuyuki Tanaka 77'	Stadium: Saitama Stadium 2002; Attendance: 24,006; Referee: Yuichi Hanakawa

11 January 2020	Shizuoka Gakuen	1−0	Yaita Chuo	Saitama
14:20	Yuta Matsumura 90+4'	Report (JFA); Report (JFA)		Stadium: Saitama Stadium 2002; Attendance: 29,747; Referee: Naoto Uehara

=== Final ===
13 January 2020
14:05

Aomori Yamada	2−3	Shizuoka Gakuen
Yudai Fujiwara 11'; Hidetoshi Takeda 33'	Report (JFA); Report (JFA)	Soshin Nakatani 45+2', 85'; Haru Kano 61'

Saitama Stadium 2002, Saitama
Attendance: 56,025
Referee: Hiroki Kasahara

GK	1	(Japan) Shibuki Sato
DF	2	(Japan) Yosuke Uchida	(substituted off) 87'
DF	3	(Japan) Yusei Kanda
DF	4	(Japan) Hiraku Hakozaki
DF	5	(Japan) Yudai Fujiwara
MF	6	(Japan) Riku Furuyado
MF	7	(Japan) Kuryu Matsuki	(substituted off) 89'
MF	8	(Japan) Rukia Urakawa	(substituted off) 71'
MF	10	(Japan) Hidetoshi Takeda (c)
MF	11	(Japan) Kenta Goto	(substituted off) 77'
FW	9	(Japan) Shota Tanaka
Substitutes:
GK	12	(Japan) Ren Nirasawa
DF	19	(Japan) Ryusei Suzuki	(substituted in) 87'
DF	24	(Japan) Shogo Matsumoto
MF	13	(Japan) Soki Tokuno	(substituted in) 71'
MF	15	(Japan) Soma Anzai	(substituted in) 77'
MF	16	(Japan) Kai Nagase
MF	18	(Japan) Paul Tabinas
FW	14	(South Korea) Kim Hyeon-woo	(substituted in) 89'
FW	17	(Japan) Nabel Yoshitaka Furusawa
Manager:
(Japan) Go Kuroda

GK	17	(Japan) Kohei Nochi
DF	3	(Japan) Kento Abe (c)
DF	4	(Japan) Shuto Tanabe
DF	5	(Japan) Soshin Nakatani
DF	15	(Japan) Taise Nishitani
MF	8	(Japan) Ren Asakura
MF	10	(Japan) Yuta Matsumura
MF	14	(Japan) Naoki Koyama
MF	16	(Japan) Kazuaki Ihori
MF	18	(Japan) Yusuke Fujita	(substituted off) 46'
FW	9	(Japan) Haru Kano
Substitutes:
GK	1	(Japan) Taiyo Kitaguchi
DF	2	(Japan) Taisei Tanaka
DF	22	(Japan) Kanta Iwano
DF	28	(Japan) Hiroki Sekine
MF	6	(Japan) Yoshiki Gondaira
MF	7	(Japan) Koya Fujii
MF	11	(Japan) Rearu Watanabe
MF	19	(Japan) Yusuke Kusayanagi	(substituted in) 46'
FW	12	(Japan) Yuki Iwamoto
Manager:
(Japan) Osamu Kawaguchi

Assistant referees:
Yosuke Takebe
Kota Watanabe
Fourth official:
Taiki Tsuruoka

Match rules

- 90 minutes.
- Extra-time of 10 minutes for each half if scores still level.
- Persisting a draw after extra-time, a penalty shoot-out would be held.
- Nine named substitutes.
- Maximum of five substitutions.

== Top scorers ==
Rank	Player	High School	Goals
1	(Japan) Yuki Iwamoto	Shizuoka Gakuen	4
1	(Japan) Yuma Mori	Yokkaichi Chuo	4
3	(Japan) Naoki Koyama	Shizuoka Gakuen	3
3	(Japan) Kuryu Matsuki	Aomori Yamada	3
3	(Japan) Hidetoshi Takeda	Aomori Yamada	3
