= 2009 Prime League =

Prime League
- Season: 2009
- Champions: Home United; 3rd title
- Matches: 219
- Goals: 330 (1.51 per match)

The Prime League 2009 (officially known as the Great-Eastern-Yeo's Prime League for sponsorship reasons) is the 13th season since the establishment of the Prime League. The season began on 3 March 2009, and ended on 3 October 2009.

== League table ==
Pos	Club	P	W	D	L	F	A	+/-	Points
1	Home United Reserves	24	14	7	3	45	29	+16	49
2	Tampines Rovers Reserves	24	13	6	5	44	28	+16	45
3	Gombak United Reserves	24	10	11	3	42	25	+17	41
4	Geylang United Reserves	24	10	8	6	44	27	+17	38
5	SAFFC Reserves	24	11	4	9	40	45	−5	37
6	Singapore U-18	24	9	3	12	44	46	−2	30
7	Balestier Khalsa Reserves	24	6	7	11	27	36	−9	25
8	Sengkang Punggol Reserves	24	5	2	17	27	46	−19	17
9	Woodlands Wellington Reserves	24	3	6	15	17	48	−31	15

== Top scorers ==
Rank	Player	Team	Goals	Remark
1	(England) Lloyd Butler	SAFFC Reserves	13	6 for Geylang United Reserves
2	(Singapore) Zulkiffli Hassim	Gombak United Reserves	11	
3	(Singapore) Sebastian Seah	Balestier Khalsa Reserves	10	
3	(Singapore) Ang Zhi Wei	Geylang United Reserves	10	
3	(Singapore) Eugene Luo	Singapore U-18	10	

== See also ==
- S. League
