= Manato Takahashi =

Japanese footballer

Takahashi Manato
Personal information
- Place of birth: Japan
- Position: Striker

Senior career*
| Years | Team | Apps | (Gls) |
| 2015 | Hougang United FC | 8 | (0) |
- * Club domestic league appearances and goals

Manato Takashi (高橋 真登, Takahashi Manato) is a Japanese former footballer who is last known to have been a member of Singapore's Hougang United in 2015.

== Singapore ==
Scoring in a pre-season friendly encountering Johor Darul Ta'zim, Manato was recruited by Hougang United for the 2015 S.League, forming what was regarded by coach Salim Moin as a redoubtable strike partnership with Equatoguinean Chupe in pre-season. However, after missing two games on account of injury, the Japanese attacker was by the Cheetahs with Renshi Yamaguchi.
