= CD Ciudad de Vícar =

Spanish football team

Ciudad de Vícar
- Full name: Club Deportivo Ciudad de Vícar
- Founded: 2007
- Dissolved: 2013
- Ground: Estadio Municipal, Vícar, Spain
- Capacity: 4,000
- 2012–13: Regional Preferente Almería – Group 1, 12th of 13
Home colours	Away colours

Club Deportivo Ciudad de Vícar was a football team based in Vícar. Founded in 2007 and dissolved in 2013, it held its home matches at Estadio Municipal de Vícar.

== History ==
CD Ciudad de Vícar was founded in 2007 after a seat exchange with CF Huercalense. CF Huercalense finally disappeared and the newly created club began in Tercera División (Third Division).

Ciudad Vícar withdrew from Tercera División in February 2012, due to not having enough players to fulfil the lineups.

== Season to season ==
Season	Tier	Division	Place	Copa del Rey
2007–08	4	3ª	12th	
2008–09	4	3ª	11th	
2009–10	4	3ª	8th	
2010–11	4	3ª	14th	1º Round
2011–12	4	3ª	W	
2012–13	6	Reg. Pref.	12th	

- 4 seasons in Tercera División

== Former players ==
- (Andorra) Josep Antoni Gomes (2010)
- (Equatorial Guinea) Gregorio (2009–2010)
