= Emir Lotinac =

Serbian footballer

Personal information
- Full name: Emir Lotinac
- Date of birth: September 25, 1987 (age 39)
- Place of birth: Novi Pazar, SFR Yugoslavia
- Height: 1.82 m (5 ft 11 1/2 in)
- Position: Centre-back

Youth career
- Novi Pazar

Senior career*
Years	Team	Apps	(Gls)
2004–2007	Novi Pazar	42	(1)
2007–2010	OFK Beograd	11	(0)
2008–2009	→ Novi Pazar (loan)	19	(0)
2010	Metalac Kraljevo	10	(0)
2010–2013	Novi Pazar	77	(1)
2014–2016	Balestier Khalsa	70	(3)
2017	Vojvodina	0	(0)
- * Club domestic league appearances and goals as of 6 July 2016

Emir Lotinac (Serbian Cyrillic: Емир Лотинац; born September 25, 1987) is a Serbian footballer who last played for the Vojvodina.

== Career ==
Lotinac was born in Novi Pazar. He began his career in his native country, Serbia, with his hometown club Novi Pazar.

He played four seasons with Novi Pazar. In 2007, he made his debut in Serbian SuperLiga. During the 2007–08 season, he joined OFK Beograd in the Serbian SuperLiga. 2008–09 he was loaned back to Novi Pazar. Later he moved on to Metalac Kraljevo.

In 2014, Lotinac signed for Singapore's S.League side Balestier Khalsa, occupying 1 of the team's 5 foreign signing slots. He was also a roommate with teammate Tarik Čmajčanin who both scored their first 2015 S.League goal for the Tigers in a 5-1 demolition of Courts Young Lions on 4 April 2015.

In February 2017 Lotinac signed a one-year deal with Vojvodina.

== Honours ==
Balestier Khalsa

- Singapore Cup: 2014
