= 2014 Prime League =

Prime League
- Season: 2014
- Champions: Home United FC
- Matches: 165
- Biggest home win: Balestier Khalsa 7–2 NFA Blues U-17 (9 June 2014)
- Biggest away win: Woodlands Wellington 1–7 Singapore Cubs (11 October 2014)
- Highest scoring: NFA Blues U-17 6–3 NFA Reds U-18 (28 April 2014); Balestier Khalsa 7–2 NFA Blues U-17 (9 June 2014)
- All statistics correct as of 26 October 2014.

The 2014 Prime League was the 17th season since the establishment of the Prime League, the reserve league of the top-tier S.League.

The league is also known as the Great Eastern YEO'S Prime League due to sponsorship reasons.

The season started on 1 March, and finished on 26 October.

Balestier Khalsa were the defending champions.

== League table ==
Pos	Team	Pld	W	D	L	GF	GA	GD	Pts
1	Home United	30	22	8	0	70	27	+43	74
2	NFA Reds U-18	30	15	9	6	54	48	+6	54
3	Geylang International	30	15	4	11	50	45	+5	49
4	Singapore Cubs	30	13	8	9	60	40	+20	47
5	Warriors F.C.	30	12	11	7	49	34	+15	47
6	NFA Blues U-17	30	11	6	13	47	51	−4	39
7	Balestier Khalsa	30	10	9	11	48	54	−6	39
8	Hougang United	30	8	10	12	43	44	−1	34
9	Tampines Rovers	30	10	3	17	58	68	−10	33
10	Woodlands Wellington	30	5	6	19	17	54	−37	21
11	Tanjong Pagar United	30	5	4	21	23	54	−31	19

Updated to match(es) played on 26 October 2014. Source: Archived December 19, 2014, at the Wayback Machine
Rules for classification: 1) points; 2) goal difference; 3) number of goals scored.

== Results ==
=== First and second round ===
Home \ Away	BKH	GLI	HME	HOU	N17	N18	SCU	TRO	TPU	WAR	WDL
Balestier Khalsa		0–2	1–4	1–0	7–2	1–3	1–4	2–3	3–0	2–2	2–2
Geylang International	1–4		0–1	1–2	2–2	3–1	2–0	1–5	1–0	1–3	3–0
Home United	5–0	3–2		4–1	4–1	2–2	0–0	5–1	3–2	3–3	1–0
Hougang United	2–2	1–2	1–2		0–1	1–2	1–1	1–4	0–0	2–2	1–1
NFA U-17	0–2	5–1	0–1	0–2		6–3	1–0	2–2	2–0	2–1	1–1
NFA U-18	2–1	2–2	1–2	2–1	0–0		2–1	1–3	2–1	0–0	2–0
Singapore Cubs	2–2	0–0	0–3	1–1	4–0	1–2		5–1	1–0	1–1	3–0
Tampines Rovers	3–0	1–2	2–3	2–4	0–3	1–1	2–4		4–2	2–3	3–0
Tanjong Pagar United	1–1	2–0	0–2	0–2	1–0	2–4	1–3	2–1		0–2	0–0
Warriors	4–1	4–0	1–1	0–0	1–2	1–1	1–2	2–1	4–1		1–0
Woodlands Wellington	0–0	0–1	1–1	0–5	2–1	1–2	1–0	3–2	1–0	0–1	

Updated to match(es) played on 26 October 2014. Source: Prime League
Legend: Blue = home team win; Yellow = draw; Red = away team win.

=== Third round ===
Home \ Away	BKH	GLI	HME	HOU	N17	N18	SCU	TRO	TPU	WAR	WDL
Balestier Khalsa		0–2		0–0		2–2		2–1			2–0
Geylang International			0–0	2–1		2–0		3–1			4–0
Home United	2–1				1–1		2–1		2–1	1–0	
Hougang United			2–5			1–1		3–4	2–0		1–0
NFA U-17	1–2	0–4		1–1		3–4					2–0
NFA U-18			2–4				4–2	2–3	1–0	1–1	2–0
Singapore Cubs	2–3	6–2		3–2	2–1					1–1	
Tampines Rovers			0–0		0–4		1–2		4–0	1–4	
Tanjong Pagar United	1–2	0–2			1–2		1–1			2–1	
Warriors	1–1	1–2		0–2	2–1						
Woodlands Wellington			0–3				1–7	2–0	1–2	0–1	

Updated to match(es) played on 26 October 2014. Source: Prime League
Legend: Blue = home team win; Yellow = draw; Red = away team win.

== Season statistics ==
=== Goalscorers ===
As of matches played 25 June 2014

Rank	Player	Club	Goals
1	(Singapore) Hizaimi Salim	Home United	14
2	(Singapore) Suria Prakash	Warriors	11
3	(Singapore) Cameroon Bell	Tampines Rovers	10
4	(Singapore) Amiruldin Asraf	NFA U-17	7
4	(Singapore) Taufik Suparno	Tampines Rovers	7
6	(Singapore) Ahmad Syahir	Balestier Khalsa	6
6	(Singapore) Noor Akid	Balestier Khalsa	6
6	(Singapore) Nazirul Islam	Hougang United	6
6	(Singapore) Andin Addie	NFA U-17	6
6	(Singapore) Zulfadhmi Suzliman	NFA U-18	6
6	(Singapore) Amin Rossady	Warriors	6
