= Gregorio (footballer) =

Equatoguinean footballer

Personal information
- Full name: Gregorio Manuel Salvador Elá
- Date of birth: 9 September 1981 (age 45)
- Place of birth: Mongomo, Equatorial Guinea
- Height: 1.88 m (6 ft 2 in)
- Position: Defender

Youth career
- 1999–2000: Los Molinos

Senior career*
Years	Team	Apps	(Gls)
2000–2004	Almería B		
2004–2008	Vera	104	(2)
2009	Español Alquián	14	(0)
2009–2010	Ciudad de Vícar	28	(2)
2010–2012	Los Molinos	57	(3)
2012–2013	Ahumada	25	(1)
2013–2014	Comarca Mármol	31	(2)
2014–2017	Pavía	71	(2)

International career
2003	Equatorial Guinea	1	(0)
- * Club domestic league appearances and goals as of 8 May 2016

Gregorio Manuel Salvador Elá (born 9 September 1981), also known as Gregorio, is an Equatoguinean retired footballer who played as a defender. He was a member of the Equatorial Guinea national team. He also holds Spanish citizenship.

== Personal life ==
Gregorio also holds Spanish citizenship. His father, Juan Salvador, is of Spanish origin and his mother, Purificación Elá, is a fang woman from Equatorial Guinea. His brother, Chupe, is also a footballer.
