= Ruzaini Zainal =

Singaporean footballer

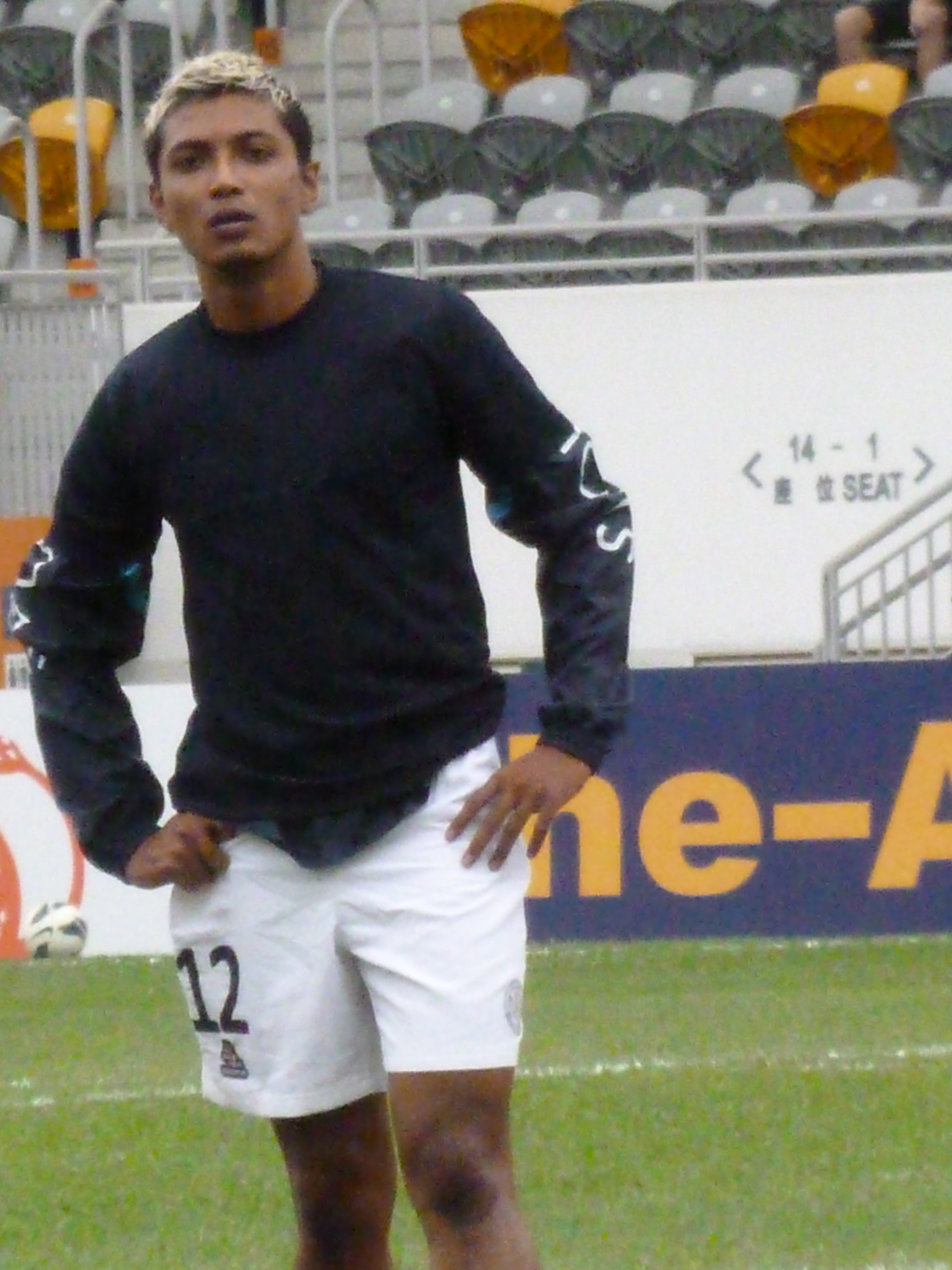

Personal information
- Full name: Mohamed Ruzaini Bin Zainal
- Date of birth: 17 October 1988 (age 38)
- Place of birth: Johor, Malaysia
- Height: 1.76 m (5 ft 9 1/2 in)
- Position: Attacking midfielder

Youth career
- 2005–2008: Singapore Armed Forces

Senior career*
Years	Team	Apps	(Gls)
2009	PUB Power	?	
2010–2011	Singapore Armed Forces	27	(1)
2011	Young Lions	11	(1)
2012	Singapore Armed Forces	18	(1)
2013	Warriors	10	(1)
2013	Tampines Rovers	8	(0)
2014	Tanjong Pagar United	22	(2)
2015	Hougang United	12	(0)

International career^{‡}
2010–2012	Singapore	4	(0)
- * Club domestic league appearances and goals as of 21 October 2017 ‡ National team caps and goals as of 21 October 2017

Ruzaini bin Zainal (born 17 October 1988) is a former professional footballer who plays as an attacking midfielder. Born in Malaysia, he played for the Singapore national team.

He was born in Johor Bahru, Malaysia but grew up in Singapore. Ruzaini originally had a Malaysian citizenship but he later changed and received his Singapore citizenship while doing his national service with the Singapore Civil Defence Forces in February 2010, and has since played for the Singapore national team.

== Club career ==
=== Early career ===
Ruzaini who came through the youth system in SAFFC from 2004–2006, was in the Prime League team from 2007 to 2008 before doing National Service end 2008. And was back with the club end 2009.

=== Club career ===
Ruzaini played 17 times in the 2010 S.League scoring 1 goal against Albirex Niigata. His impressive performances caught the eye of the National Coach who drafted him into the Singapore national team for matches before the AFF Suzuki Cup. But was not pick for the tournament. He was awarded his first professional contract after he finished his national service in December 2010. In the 2013 S.League, Ruzaini sign for Tampines Rovers from SAFFC after having played 3 years with them. After the season, he was not retained by the club and went to sign for Tanjong Pagar United on 19 December 2013.

== International career ==
He was born in Johor Bahru, Malaysia but grew up in Singapore. Ruzaini originally had a Malaysian citizenship but he later changed and received his Singapore citizenship while doing his national service with the Singapore Civil Defence Forces in February 2010, and has since played for the Singapore national team.
