= Chupe (footballer) =

Equatoguinean footballer (born 1980)

Personal information
- Full name: Francisco Salvador Elá
- Date of birth: 9 May 1980 (age 46)
- Place of birth: Mongomo, Equatorial Guinea
- Height: 1.77 m (5 ft 10 in)
- Position: Striker

Youth career
- Los Molinos
- Real Madrid

Senior career*
Years	Team	Apps	(Gls)
1999–2000	Real Madrid C		
2000–2001	→ Alcorcón (loan)	33	(16)
2001–2004	Real Madrid B	59	(3)
2004–2005	Las Palmas	2	(0)
2005	Puertollano	10	(0)
2006	Rayo Vallecano		
2006	Leganés	7	(0)
2007	Chiasso	6	(1)
2007–2008	Vera	40	(15)
2009	Binéfar		
2009–2010	Noja	36	(25)
2010	Leioa	2	(0)
2010–2012	Noja	34	(18)
2012–2013	Kazincbarcikai	29	(7)
2014	Happy Valley Reserves	2	(2)
2014	Tai Po	6	(6)
2014	Lane Xang	6	(8)
2015	Hougang United	11	(3)
2015	Għajnsielem		
2016	Santa Ana		

International career
2003–2015	Equatorial Guinea	5	(0)
2011	Equatorial Guinea B	1	(0)
- * Club domestic league appearances and goals as of 18 October 2015

Francisco Salvador Elá (born 9 May 1980), commonly known as Chupe, is an Equatoguinean former professional footballer who played as a striker.

== Club career ==
Born in Mongomo, Chupe spent 13 years as a senior in Spanish football safe for a very brief spell in Switzerland with FC Chiasso, but never competed in higher than Segunda División B. He spent several seasons associated with Real Madrid but only appeared officially with its C and B-teams, even though main squad manager Vicente del Bosque registered him in one UEFA Champions League list as a youth system player.

Other than the Merengues Chupe represented in the country AD Alcorcón, UD Las Palmas, UD Puertollano, Rayo Vallecano, CD Leganés, CD Vera de Almería, CD Binéfar, SD Noja (two spells) and SD Leioa. In 2012–13, at age 32, he made his debut as a professional, representing Kazincbarcikai SC in Hungary's second level.

In December 2013, after a brief trial in Cambodia with Phnom Penh Crown FC, Chupe moved to Hong Kong with Happy Valley AA.

== International career ==
Chupe earned five caps for Equatorial Guinea, the first two coming in 2003 in the 2006 FIFA World Cup qualifiers against Togo. He made his debut on 11 October in the 1–0 home win in Bata (1–2 aggregate loss).

== Personal life ==
Chupe's younger brother, Gregorio, was also a footballer. A defender, he spent his entire career in Spanish amateur football.
