= CD Vera de Almería =

Association football club in Spain

Vera
- Full name: Club Deportivo Vera
- Founded: 1960
- Ground: Las Viñas, Vera, Andalusia, Spain
- Capacity: 7,000
- Chairman: (Spain) Francisco Alonso
- Manager: (Spain) Manuel Gaspar
- League: Primera Andaluza Almería
- 2024–25: Primera Andaluza Almería, 5th of 16
Home colours	Away colours

Club Deportivo Vera is a Spanish football club based in Vera, Province of Almería, in the autonomous community of Andalusia. Founded in 1960 it currently plays in Primera Andaluza Almería, holding home games at Estadio Las Viñas, with a 7,000-seat capacity.

== Season to season ==
Season	Tier	Division	Place	Copa del Rey
1960–1970	—	Regional	—	
1970–71	5	2ª Reg.	2nd	
1971–72	5	2ª Reg.	(R)	
1972–73	5	2ª Reg.	4th	
1973–74	5	2ª Reg.	2nd	
1974–75	5	2ª Reg.	6th	
1975–76	6	2ª Reg.	2nd	
1976–77	6	2ª Reg.	4th	
1977–78	7	2ª Reg.	2nd	
1978–79	6	1ª Reg.	10th	
1979–80	6	1ª Reg.	3rd	
1980–81	5	Reg. Pref.	7th	
1981–82	5	Reg. Pref.	7th	
1982–83	6	1ª Reg.	1st	
1983–84	5	Reg. Pref.	10th	
1984–85	6	1ª Reg.	7th	
1985–86	7	2ª Reg.	1st	
1986–87	6	1ª Reg.	1st	
1987–88	5	Reg. Pref.	3rd	
1988–89	4	3ª	21st	

Season	Tier	Division	Place	Copa del Rey
1989–90	5	Reg. Pref.	10th	
1990–91	5	Reg. Pref.	13th	
1991–92	5	Reg. Pref.	11th	
1992–93	5	Reg. Pref.	6th	
1993–94	5	Reg. Pref.	7th	
1994–95	5	Reg. Pref.	3rd	
1995–96	5	Reg. Pref.	10th	
1996–97	5	Reg. Pref.	10th	
1997–98	5	Reg. Pref.	5th	
1998–99	5	Reg. Pref.	1st	
1999–2000	5	Reg. Pref.	3rd	
2000–01	5	Reg. Pref.	2nd	
2001–02	5	Reg. Pref.	3rd	
2002–03	5	Reg. Pref.	1st	
2003–04	4	3ª	16th	
2004–05	4	3ª	16th	
2005–06	4	3ª	12th	
2006–07	4	3ª	12th	
2007–08	4	3ª	14th	
2008–09	4	3ª	17th	

Season	Tier	Division	Place	Copa del Rey
2009–10	4	3ª	W	
2010–11	5	1ª And.	14th	
2011–12	5	1ª And.	8th	
2012–13	5	1ª And.	11th	
2013–14	5	1ª And.	17th	
2014–15	6	2ª And.	10th	
2015–16	6	2ª And.	6th	
2016–17	6	1ª And.	5th	
2017–18	6	1ª And.	1st	
2018–19	5	Div. Hon.	13th	
2019–20	6	1ª And.	1st	
2020–21	5	Div. Hon.	9th	
2021–22	7	1ª And.	1st	
2022–23	7	1ª And.	5th	
2023–24	7	1ª And.	3rd	
2024–25	7	1ª And.	5th	
2025–26	7	1ª And.		

- 8 seasons in Tercera División

== Former players ==
- (Equatorial Guinea) Chupe
- (Equatorial Guinea) Gregorio
