= Shunsuke Nakatake =

Japanese professional footballer

Personal information
- Full name: Shunsuke Nakatake
- Date of birth: 19 June 1990 (age 36)
- Place of birth: Hokkaido, Japan
- Height: 1.73 m (5 ft 8 in)
- Position: Midfielder

Senior career*
Years	Team	Apps	(Gls)
2013	Eunos Crescent		
2014–2015	Hougang United	37	(1)
2016–2017	Kuantan	40	(1)
2018	PDRM	15	(1)
2019–2020	Negeri Sembilan	0	(0)
- * Club domestic league appearances and goals as of 13 July 2018

Shunsuke Nakatake (中武 駿介, Nakatake Shunsuke; born 19 June 1990) is a Japanese professional footballer.

== Career ==
=== Eunos Crescent ===
After arriving from Japan to try and secure a professional contract with a S.League side, Nakatake found that every team had filled their five-man foreign player roster. However, he refused to give up and played instead in the amateur National Football League with Eunos Crescent FC.

=== Hougang United ===
Having impressed in the NFL with Eunos, Nakatake was signed by the Cheetahs for the 2014 S.League season, filling one of five foreign players spot. In his first season as a professional footballer, he made a total of 31 appearances, scoring one goal.

Nakatake was the only foreign player on Hougang's 2014 squad that was retained by the Cheetahs for the 2015 S.League season.

=== Kuantan FA ===
In 2016, Nakatake signed for Malaysia Premier League side Kuantan FA, playing for two seasons with the club.

=== PDRM FA ===
Having been released from his Kuantan FA contract, Nakatake signed with another Malaysia Premier League side PDRM FA for the 2018 season.

== Career statistics ==
=== Club ===
Club	Season	S.League		Singapore Cup		League Cup		ACL		AFC Cup		Total	
Club	Season	Apps	Goals	Apps	Goals	Apps	Goals	Apps	Goals	Apps	Goals	Apps	Goals
Hougang United	2014	26	1	1	0	4	0	-				31	1
Hougang United	2015	11	0	0	0	0	0	—				11	0
Total		37	1	1	0	0	4	0	0	0	0	42	1
