= Manato Yamada =

Japanese footballer

Personal information
- Date of birth: 31 May 2001 (age 25)
- Place of birth: Shiga, Japan
- Height: 1.81 m (5 ft 11 in)
- Position: Midfielder

Team information
- Current team: Matsumoto Yamaga
- Number: 30

Youth career
- Ohara SSS
- Sagawa Shiga
- 2017–2019: Rissho Univ. Shonan High School

Senior career*
| Years | Team | Apps | (Gls) |
| 2020– | Matsumoto Yamaga | 1 | (0) |
- * Club domestic league appearances and goals as of 17:04, 28 March 2021 (UTC)

Manato Yamada (山田 真夏斗, Yamada Manato; born 31 May 2001) is a Japanese footballer currently playing as a midfielder for Matsumoto Yamaga.

== Career statistics ==
=== Club ===
As of 28 March 2021.

| Club | Season | League | | | National Cup | | League Cup | | Other | | Total | |
| Club | Season | Division | Apps | Goals | Apps | Goals | Apps | Goals | Apps | Goals | Apps | Goals |
|---|---|---|---|---|---|---|---|---|---|---|---|---|
| Matsumoto Yamaga | 2020 | J2 League | 1 | 0 | 0 | 0 | 0 | 0 | 0 | 0 | 1 | 0 |
| Matsumoto Yamaga | 2021 | J2 League | 0 | 0 | 0 | 0 | 0 | 0 | 0 | 0 | 0 | 0 |
| Career total | | | 1 | 0 | 0 | 0 | 0 | 0 | 0 | 0 | 1 | 0 |
