= Vuk Sotirović =

Serbian footballer

Personal information
- Full name: Vuk Sotirović
- Date of birth: 13 July 1982 (age 44)
- Place of birth: Belgrade, SFR Yugoslavia
- Height: 1.77 m (5 ft 9 1/2 in)
- Position: Striker

Senior career*
Years	Team	Apps	(Gls)
- Železničar Beograd
2001–2004	Grafičar Beograd		
2004	Kosanica		
2005–2006	ŁKS Łódź	23	(5)
2006–2007	Zawisza Bydgoszcz (2)	33	(13)
2007–2008	Jagiellonia Białystok	37	(12)
2008–2011	Śląsk Wrocław	48	(17)
2011	→ Jagiellonia Białystok (loan)	4	(0)
2011–2012	Pogoń Szczecin	29	(5)
2012	BSK Borča	11	(3)
2013	Nea Salamis	11	(1)
2013–2014	Javor Ivanjica	7	(3)
2014	Novi Pazar	6	(1)
2014	Radnički Kragujevac	8	(1)
2015	Novi Pazar	5	(0)
2015	Hougang United	14	(6)
2016	Borac Čačak	12	(1)
2016	Zemun	6	(2)
2017	Grafičar Beograd		
- * Club domestic league appearances and goals

Vuk Sotirović (Serbian Cyrillic: Вук Сотировић; born 13 July 1982) is a Serbian former professional footballer who played as a striker.

== Career ==
In February 2011, he was loaned to Jagiellonia Białystok on a half year deal.

He was released from Śląsk Wrocław on 2 July 2011.

== Honours ==
Śląsk Wrocław

- Ekstraklasa Cup: 2008–09
