= Tarik Čmajčanin =

Serbian footballer

Personal information
- Date of birth: 18 June 1994 (age 32)
- Place of birth: Novi Pazar, FR Yugoslavia
- Height: 1.78 m (5 ft 10 in)
- Position: Attacking midfielder

Team information
- Current team: FSV Bernau
- Number: 18

Youth career
- 2010–2013: Novi Pazar

Senior career*
| Years | Team | Apps | (Gls) |
| 2013–2014 | Sinđelić Niš | 27 | (6) |
| 2015 | Balestier Khalsa | 27 | (2) |
| 2016 | Mika | 7 | (1) |
| 2016-2017 | Teuta | 30 | (3) |
| 2018 | Jagodina | | |
| 2019 | Ballkani | | |
| 2020 | Trepça '89 | 8 | (0) |
| 2021 | Ibar | | |
| 2021 | Dubočica | | |
| 2022 | Josanica | | |
| 2022-2023 | SG Westend Frankfurt | 19 | (7) |
| 2023- | FSV Bernau | 14 | (1) |
- * Club domestic league appearances and goals as of 27 February 2019

Tarik Cmajcanin (Serbian Cyrillic: Тарик Чмајчанин, born 18 June 1994) is a Serbian footballer who plays for German lower league side FSV Bernau as an attacking midfielder.

== Career ==
Born in Novi Pazar, Serbia, Cmajcanin started his career at local club FK Novi Pazar. He next signed for Serbian League East side FK Sinđelić Niš where he made 27 league appearances and scored 6 goals while assisting another 7.

Cmajcanin was signed by S.League side Balestier Khalsa FC for the 2015 S.League season as a replacement for outgoing playmaker Park Kang-jin. He made his competitive debut for the Tigers in the 2015 Singapore Charity Shield, which doubled as the first league match of the season, but saw his side lose 1-0 to Warriors FC. Although Balestier had qualified for the 2015 AFC Cup, Cmajcanin will see no action on the continental stage as he was left out of Balestier's AFC Cup squad as a result of the 3+1 rule.

Čmajčanin scored his first competitive goal after 4 league games for the Tigers in a 5-1 demolition of Courts Young Lions on 4 April 2015.

Čmajčanin signed for KF Ballkani in Kosovo in January 2019. In 2020, he joined KF Trepça '89. He suffered a serious injury in March 2020.

== Career statistics ==
=== Club ===
| Club | Season | Serbian League East | | | | | | | | | | Total | |
| Club | Season | Apps | Goals | Apps | Goals | Apps | Goals | Apps | Goals | Apps | Goals | Apps | Goals |
|---|---|---|---|---|---|---|---|---|---|---|---|---|---|
| FK Sinđelić Niš | 2013-14 | 27 | 6 | — | | | | | | | | 27 | 6 |
| FK Sinđelić Niš | Total | 27 | 6 | 0 | 0 | 0 | 0 | 0 | 0 | 0 | 0 | 27 | 6 |
| Club | Season | S.League | | Singapore Cup | | League Cup | | | | | AFC Cup | | Total |
| Club | Season | Apps | Goals | Apps | Goals | Apps | Goals | Apps | Goals | Apps | Goals | Apps | Goals |
| Balestier Khalsa | 2015 | 28 | 1 | 0 | 0 | 0 | 0 | — | | 0 | - | | |
| Balestier Khalsa | Total | 28 | 1 | 0 | 0 | 0 | 0 | 0 | 0 | 0 | 0 | 7 | 1 |
| Career Total | | 37 | 7 | 0 | 0 | 0 | 0 | 0 | 0 | 0 | 0 | 37 | 7 |
