= Fadhil Salim =

Singaporean footballer

Personal information
- Date of birth: 24 January 1983 (age 43)
- Place of birth: Singapore
- Height: 1.77 m (5 ft 9 1/2 in)
- Position: Goalkeeper

Team information
- Current team: Albirex Niigata (S) (goalkeeper coach)

Youth career
- 1999: Sembawang Rangers
- 2000: Woodlands Wellington
- 2001: National Football Academy

Senior career*
Years	Team	Apps	(Gls)
2002–2003	Woodlands Wellington	58	(0)
2004	SAFFC	1	(0)
2006	Young Lions	32	(0)
2007	Woodlands Wellington	35	(0)
2008–2009	Gombak United	21	(0)
2010–2014	Hougang United	127	(0)

International career
2006	Singapore	1	(0)

Managerial career
- 2021–: Albirex Niigata (S) (goalkeeper coach)
- * Club domestic league appearances and goals

Fadhil Salim (born 24 January 1983) is a retired Singaporean goalkeeper who last played for S.League club Hougang United.

== Playing career ==
Fadhil started playing for Woodland Wellington in 2002.

In 2010, Fadhil joined Hougang United.

Fadhil was nominated by the club for the YEO'S People's Choice Award 2010 for the 2010 S.League season.

Fadhil was voted the S.League 'Goalkeeper of the Year' for three consecutives time in 2011, 2012 and 2013.

== International career ==
Fadhil make his Singapore national team debut on 26 December 2006 in a friendly match against Thailand at the Suphachalasai Stadium.

== Coaching career ==
In March 2021, Fadhil was appointed as Albirex Niigata (S) as the club goalkeeper coach.
