= Đurica Župarić =

Croatian footballer

Personal information
- Date of birth: 22 September 1984 (age 40)
- Place of birth: Rovinj, Croatia
- Position(s): Defender

Senior career*
| Years | Team | Apps | (Gls) |
| 2008 | Imotski | | |
| 2009 | Libertas Novska | | |
| 2009 | Nagyberki | | |
| 2010 | Barcsi | | |
| 2010 | Segesta Sisak | | |
| 2011 | Žminj | | |
| 2011–2012 | Marsonia | | |
| 2013 | Savski Marof | | |
| 2013 | HAŠK | 12 | (0) |
| 2014 | Hougang United | 8 | (0) |
| 2015 | Kanbawza | | |
| 2016-2019 | Segesta Sisak | | |
| 2019 | Lukavec | | |
- *Club domestic league appearances and goals

Đurica Župarić (born 22 September 1984 in Croatia) is a Croatian retired footballer who is last known to have played for Segesta Sisak in his home country.

== Career ==
=== NK Marsonia 1909 ===
Due to NK Marsonia 1909 not paying for his apartment, Župarić was bereft of a home for some time, staying on the streets.

=== Singapore ===
Arriving at Hougang United of the Singaporean S.League in 2014, Župarić had a good impression of Singapore, saying that the league was professionally organized. However, the Croatian defender was unavailable for the Cheetahs clash hosting Albirex, limping off his previous game.

== Personal life ==
He has a younger brother who lives with his father and works in the tourism industry.
