= Prime League =

Football league in Singapore

- Founded: 1997
- Folded: 2017
- Country: Singapore
- Confederation: AFC (Asia)
- Number of clubs: 8
- Domestic cup: Singapore FA Cup
- Last champions: Home United (2017)
- Most championships: Home United (8 titles)
- Website: Official website

The Prime League was the reserve and youth team football league of Singapore's S.League. Teams involved in the league were primarily made up of youth players from the S.League clubs. The Prime League was founded in 1997. S.League clubs are required to participate, and clubs who do not play at S.League level are also eligible to enter. In 2018, the Prime League was abolished, with the National Football League (NFL) installed as the second-tier competition.

The National Football Academy also entered teams.

== Participation rules ==
All S.League teams had to register a minimum of 15 and a maximum of 20 players for the Prime League. Clubs not participating in the S. League had to register a minimum of 15 and a maximum of 25 players. The teams were required to maintain the minimum of number of players throughout the season.
Each club was allowed to register 1 foreign player for their Prime League teams. The foreign players were to be been aged between 18 and 21 at the point of registration and were not eligible to play in the S.League.

An S.League player who had played in his club's most recent S.League match was not eligible to play in the club's next Prime League match.

== Past champions ==
Year	Champions	Runners-up
1997	Singapore Armed Forces	Balestier Khalsa
1998	Geylang United	Home United
1999	Singapore Armed Forces	Home United
2000	Singapore Armed Forces	Home United
2001	Home United	Singapore Armed Forces
2002	Home United	Singapore Armed Forces
2003	Home United	(China) Sinchi FC
2004	Home United	Singapore Armed Forces
2005	(China) Sinchi FC	Geylang United
2006	Geylang United	Singapore Armed Forces
2007	Singapore Armed Forces	Tampines Rovers
2008	(Singapore) NFA U-18	Gombak United
2009	Home United	Tampines Rovers
2010	(Singapore) NFA U-18	Home United
2011	Geylang United	Gombak United
2012	Balestier Khalsa	(Singapore) NFA U-18
2013	Balestier Khalsa	Home United
2014	Home United	Geylang International
2015	Tampines Rovers	(Singapore) NFA U-18
2016	Home United	Warriors FC
2017	Home United	Hougang United

=== Performance by Clubs ===
Club	Winners	Runners-up	Winning years
Home United	8	5	2001, 2002, 2003, 2004, 2009, 2014, 2016, 2017
Warriors FC	4	5	1997, 1999, 2000, 2007
Geylang International	3	2	1998, 2006, 2011
(Singapore) NFA U-18	2	2	2008, 2010
Balestier Khalsa	2	1	2012, 2013
Tampines Rovers	1	2	2015
(China) Sinchi FC	1	1	2005
Gombak United	0	2	
Hougang United	0	1	

== See also ==
- Singapore Premier League
- Singapore Cup
- Singapore League Cup
- Singapore FA Cup
- Singapore Community Shield
- List of football clubs in Singapore

== Performance in Singapore FA Cup ==
From 2006 to 2017, Prime League sides were also allowed to take part in the Singapore FA Cup. Prime League teams won the cup in all but four seasons:

- 2006 - Singapore Armed Forces FC
- 2007 - Geylang United
- 2008 - Singapore Armed Forces FC
- 2011 - Tampines Rovers
- 2012 - Balestier Khalsa
- 2013 - Home United
- 2015 - Home United
- 2016 - Home United
- 2013 - Warriors FC
