= Diego Gama (Brazilian footballer) =

Brazilian footballer (born 1983)

Personal information
- Full name: Diego Gama de Oliveira
- Date of birth: 6 May 1983 (age 43)
- Place of birth: Santos, São Paulo, Brazil
- Height: 1.85 m (6 ft 1 in)
- Position: Forward

Senior career*
Years	Team	Apps	(Gls)
2005	Itararé		
2006–2009	Grêmio Anápolis		
2006–2007	→ Desportivo Aves (loan)	7	(0)
2008	→ XV de Novembro (loan)		
2009	The Cong		
2010	La Paz		
2011	Hougang United	13	(8)
2012–2013	Arema		
2014	Hougang United	25	(10)
2015	Pusamania Borneo		
2015	Hougang United	15	(1)
2016	Gresik United	18	(7)
2017–2018	Nagaworld	14	(9)
2018	Ka I		
2019	Lun Lok		
- * Club domestic league appearances and goals

Diego Gama de Oliveira (born 6 May 1983) is a Brazilian former footballer.

== Career ==
In February 2015, he signed with Gresik United.

== Honours ==
Hougang United

Runner-up

- Singapore League Cup: 2011
