= Renshi Yamaguchi =

Japanese footballer

Personal information
- Full name: Renshi Yamaguchi
- Date of birth: 16 September 1992 (age 34)
- Place of birth: Yokohama, Kanagawa, Japan
- Height: 1.75 m (5 ft 9 in)
- Position: Midfielder

Youth career
- –2014: Hosei University

Senior career*
| Years | Team | Apps | (Gls) |
| 2015 | Hougang United | 7 | (0) |
| 2015–2018 | Lao Toyota | 67 | (0) |
| 2018–2019 | Ubon United | 28 | (1) |
| 2019–2020 | Ayutthaya United | 3 | (0) |
| 2020–2021 | Lampang | 26 | (0) |
| 2021–2023 | Arema | 60 | (0) |
| 2023–2024 | Gresik United | 17 | (1) |
| 2024–2025 | Persiku Kudus | 22 | (0) |
- * Club domestic league appearances and goals as of 20 February 2025

Renshi Yamaguchi (山口 廉史; born 16 September 1992) is a Japanese former professional footballer who played as a midfielder.

== Youth career ==
Renshi started his football career when he was in Hosei University, a private university in Tokyo.

== Club career ==
=== Hougang United ===
In January 2015, Renshi move abroad to Singapore to join a local club, Hougang United. In his debut game, he received a yellow card on his debut and performing prosaically for Hougang United in a 0–0 stalemate against Geylang International in 2015, Renshi was released with Takashi Manato by June that year.

=== Lao Toyota ===
On 24 July 2015, Renshi joined Laos club, Lao Toyota. Being one of Lao Toyota's foreign imports from 2016, the Japanese defender was selected for the Lao Premier League All-Stars for their game opposing the Cambodian League All-Stars in 2016. After 3 Years with the Laos club winning three Lao Premier League title, he left for Thailand.

=== Ubon United ===
On 26 December 2018, Renshi moved to Thailand to joined Thai League 2 side, Ubon United which recently got relegated from the Thai top division league. On 4 August 2019, Renshi scored his first goal for the club against Air Force United.

=== Ayutthaya United ===
On 27 December 2019, Renshi joined another Thai League 2 side, Ayutthaya United for the 2020–21 Thai League 2 season.

=== Lampang FC ===
On 26 August 2020, Renshi joined Lampang FC. He appeared in almost every single game for the club appearing 28 time in all competitions played.

=== Arema FC ===
On 21 June 2021, Renshi move abroad to Indonesia and signed a one-year contract with Arema FC for the Indonesian 2021–22 Liga 1 season. Renshi made his league debut in a 1–1 draw against PSM Makassar on 5 September 2021. On 17 July 2022, he helped Arema to win the 2022 Indonesia President's Cup. After making 68 appearances for the club, he was released at the end of the 2022–23 Liga 1 season.

=== Gresik United ===
On 17 August 2023, second tier Liga 2 club, Gresik United announced a deal for Yamaguchi to join the team on a free transfer. Yamaguchi made his league debut in a 2–0 home win against Persekat Tegal on 10 September 2023.

== Honours ==
Lao Toyota

- Lao Premier League: 2015, 2017, 2018

Arema

- Piala Presiden: 2022
