= Yuki Uchiyama (footballer) =

Japanese footballer

Yuki Uchiyama 内山裕貴
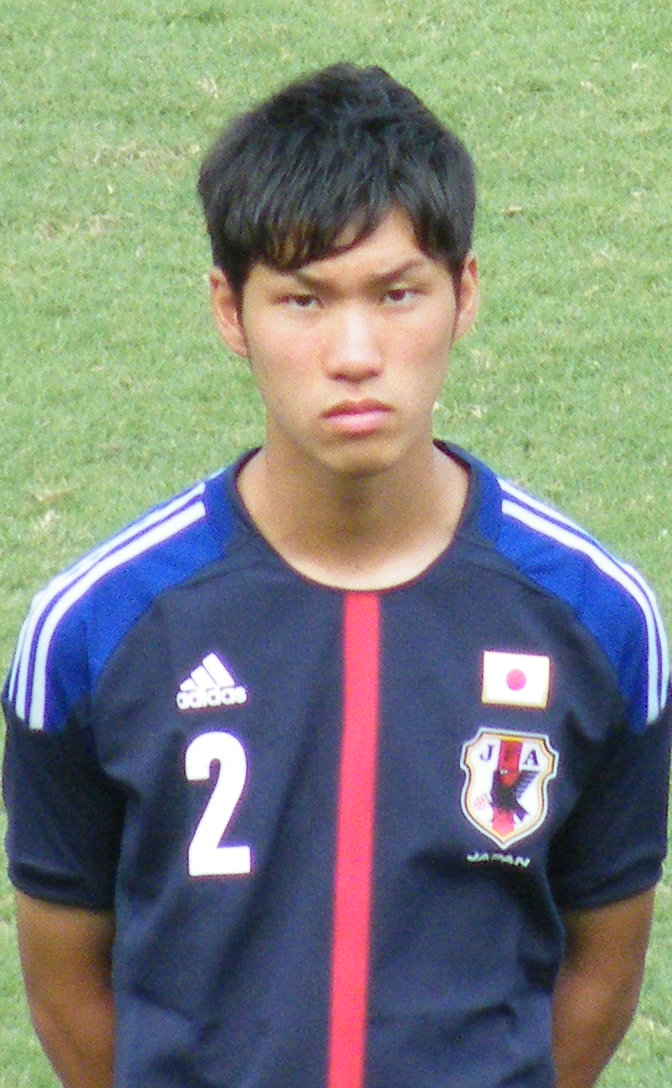

Personal information
- Full name: Yuki Uchiyama
- Date of birth: May 7, 1995 (age 31)
- Place of birth: Sapporo, Japan
- Height: 1.83 m (6 ft 0 in)
- Position: Defender

Youth career
- –2013: Hokkaido Consadole Sapporo

Senior career*
Years	Team	Apps	(Gls)
2014–2016	Hokkaido Consadole Sapporo	0	(0)
2014	→ J. League U-22 (loan)	11	(0)
2015	→ Hougang United (loan)	17	(2)
2017–2019	Gainare Tottori	19	(0)
2020–	Hokkaido Tokachi Sky Earth	37	(3)

International career
2013	Japan U19	1	(0)
- * Club domestic league appearances and goals as of 29 September 2024

Yuki Uchiyama (内山 裕貴, Uchiyama Yūki; born May 7, 1995) is a Japanese football player who plays for fifth-tier Hokkaido Soccer League club Hokkaido Tokachi Sky Earth.

== Playing career ==
Uchiyama joined to J2 League club; Consadole Sapporo in 2014. In 2015, he moved to Hougang United. In 2016, he back to Hokkaido Consadole Sapporo.

Uchiyama played for Japan U19 squad making his only appearances in a 4–0 win over Russia U19 on 16 August 2013.

== Club statistics ==
Updated to 23 February 2018.

Club performance			League		Cup		Total	
Season	Club	League	Apps	Goals	Apps	Goals	Apps	Goals
Japan			League		Emperor's Cup		Total	
2014	Consadole Sapporo	J2 League	0	0	1	0	1	0
2016	Hokkaido Consadole Sapporo	J2 League	0	0	1	0	1	0
2017	Gainare Tottori	J3 League	9	0	0	0	9	0
Total			9	0	2	0	11	0
