= 2014 Geylang International FC season =

Geylang International FC
2014 season
- Chairman: (Singapore) Leong Kok Fann
- Coach: (Germany) Jörg Steinebrunner
- Ground: Bedok Stadium
- S.League: 8th
- Singapore Cup: Quarter-finals
- League Cup: Semi-finals
- Top goalscorer: League: Leonel Felice (13); All: Leonel Felice (16)

The 2014 S.League season was Geylang International's 19th season in the top flight of Singapore football and 39th year in existence as a football club.

== Squad ==
No.	Name	Nationality	Position (s)	Date of Birth (Age)
Goalkeepers
19	Joey Sim	(Singapore)	GK	2 March 1987 (age 39)
21	Siddiq Durimi	(Singapore)	GK	27 May 1988 (age 38)
Defenders
2	Khairulnizam Jumahat	(Singapore)	DF	8 December 1989 (age 36)
3	Yuki Ichikawa	(Japan)	DF	29 August 1987 (age 39)
4	Hamqaamal Shah	(Singapore)	DF	5 September 1986 (age 40)
5	Kento Fukuda	(Japan)	DF	15 May 1990 (age 36)
14	K.Sathiaraj	(Singapore)	DF	15 October 1986 (age 40)
16	Wyldan Wisam	(Singapore)	DF	28 March 1994 (age 32)
Midfielders
6	Thorsten Schneider	(Germany)	MF	28 January 1982 (age 44)
7	Mustaqim Manzur	(Singapore)	MF	28 January 1982 (age 44)
8	Jalal Jasim	(Singapore)	MF	28 December 1980 (age 45)
10	Franco Chivilo	(Argentina)	MF	28 April 1991 (age 35)
11	Hafiz Nor	(Singapore)	MF	22 August 1988 (age 38)
12	Fabian Kwok	(Singapore)	MF	17 March 1989 (age 37)
15	Shah Hirul	(Singapore)	MF	7 May 1986 (age 40)
17	Aliff Shafaein	(Singapore)	MF	19 April 1982 (age 44)
Forwards
9	Leonel Felice	(Argentina)	FW	31 August 1983 (age 43)
18	Ridhuan Muhammad	(Singapore)	FW	6 May 1984 (age 42)

== Coaching staff ==
Position	Name	Ref
Head coach	(Germany) Jörg Steinbrunner	
Assistant coach	(Argentina) Nazareno Velez	
Goalkeeping coach	(Australia) Scott Scarr	
Team manager	(Singapore) Andrew Ang	
Physiotherapist	(Singapore) Terence Chua	
Kitman	(Singapore) Abdul Halim Yusop	

== Pre-Season Transfers ==
=== In ===
Position	Player	Transferred From	Ref
DF	(Japan) Yuki Ichikawa	(Japan) Albirex Niigata Singapore	
DF	(Singapore) Hamqaamal Shah	(Singapore) Balestier Khalsa	
DF	(Singapore) Kento Fukuda	(Japan) Albirex Niigata Singapore	
DF	(Argentina) Joaquin Lopez	Free transfer	
MF	(Singapore) Mustaqim Manzur	(Singapore) Home United	
FW	(Argentina) Leonel Felice	Free transfer	
MF	(Argentina) Franco Chivilo	Free transfer	
MF	(Singapore) Hafiz Nor	(Singapore) Tanjong Pagar United	
MF	(Singapore) K Sathiaraj	Free transfer	
DF	(Singapore) Wyldan Wisam	(Singapore) Geylang International U23	
MF	(Singapore) Aliff Shafaein	(Singapore) Home United	
MF	(Singapore) Ridhuan Muhammad	(Indonesia) Putra Samarinda FC	
MF	(Singapore) Jonathan Tan	(Singapore) National Football Academy	
GK	(Singapore) Siddiq Durimi	(Singapore) Admiralty FC	

=== Out ===
Position	Player	Transferred To	Ref
GK	(Japan) Takuma Ito	(Japan) Reinmeer Aomori F.C	
MF	(Singapore) Khairulhayat Jumat	Retired	
DF	(Singapore) Delwinder Singh	(Singapore) Young Lions	
MF	(Singapore) Duncan Elias	Retired	
DF	(Japan) Norihiro Kawakami	(Singapore) Tampines Rovers	
FW	(Japan) Shotaro Ihata	Released	
MF	(Singapore) Yasir Hanapi	(Singapore) Home United	
MF	(France) Stefan Milojevic	(Singapore) Woodlands Wellington	
MF	(Singapore) Andrew Tan	(Singapore) Katong FC	
FW	(Singapore) Wahyudi Wahid	(Singapore) Hougang United	
MF	(Singapore) Mohd Noor Ali	Retired	
MF	(Singapore) Nurhazwan Norasikin	(Singapore) Warriors FC	
MF	(Singapore) Taufiq Ghani	(Singapore) Woodlands Wellington	
FW	(Slovakia) Jozef Kaplan	(Malaysia) Negeri Sembilan FA	

== Mid-Season Transfers ==
=== In ===
Position	Player	Transferred From	Ref
MF	(Germany) Thorsten Schneider	Free transfer	

=== Out ===
Position	Player	Transferred To	Ref
DF	(Argentina) Joaquin Lopez	(Singapore) Geylang International U23	
FW	(Singapore) Jonathan Tan	(Singapore) Geylang International U23	

== Pre-season friendlies ==
11 January 2014 Pre-Season Friendly	(Singapore) Hougang United	3–0	(Singapore) Geylang International	Hougang Stadium
17:00 (UTC+8)

15 January 2014 Pre-Season Friendly	(Malaysia) Negeri Sembilan	3–0	(Singapore) Geylang International	Tuanku Abdul Rahman Stadium
20:45

18 January 2014 Pre-Season Friendly	(Singapore) Geylang International	1–0	(Singapore) Warriors FC	Bedok Stadium
17:00 (UTC+8)		Report

25 January 2014 Pre-Season Friendly	(Singapore) Geylang International	1–0	(Singapore) Tampines Rovers	Bedok Stadium
17:00 (UTC+8)		Report

== IFA Shield 2014 ==
1 February 2014 Group Stage	(India) Kingfisher East Bengal	2–0	(Singapore) Geylang International	Salt Lake Stadium
15:15 (UTC+6)	Seminlen Doungel 72'; Chidi Edeh 90'	Report

4 February 2014 Group Stage	(Singapore) Geylang International	0–0	(South Korea) Sun Moon University	Salt Lake Stadium
18:30 (UTC+6)		Report

8 February 2014 Group Stage	(India) United Sports Club	2–1	(Singapore) Geylang International	Salt Lake Stadium
18:30 (UTC+6)	Baldeep Singh 21'; Eric Brown 34'	Report	Kento Fukuda 38'

== Club Friendlies ==
7 March 2014 Club Friendly	(Singapore) Geylang International	2–2	(Indonesia) Pro Duta	Bedok Stadium
17:00 (UTC+8)		Report

13 June 2014 Club Friendly	(Singapore) Geylang International	2–1	Singapore Cricket Club	Bedok Stadium
19:00 (UTC+8)		Report

14 August 2014 Club Friendly	Singapore Cricket Club	0–2	(Singapore) Geylang International	The Padang
17:00 (UTC+8)

== S.League ==
=== Round 1 ===
23 February 2014 1	(Singapore) Warriors FC	2–1	(Singapore) Geylang International	Choa Chu Kang Stadium
19:30 (UTC+8)	Thomas Beattie (yellow card) 18'; Hafiz Rahim 23'; Zulfadli Zainal Abidin (yellow card) 54'; Irwan Shah 62'; Marin Vidosevic (yellow card) 81' (yellow-red card); Miroslav Pejic (yellow card) 90'	Report	Hafiz Nor 90'	Referee: Sukbir Singh

1 March 2014 2	(Singapore) Home United	4–1	(Singapore) Geylang International	Bishan Stadium
19:30 (UTC+8)	Izddin Shafiq 23'; Precious Emuejeraye (yellow card) 41'; Yasir Hanapi 43' 76'; Da-Kyung Kwon 52'	Report	Leonel Felice 63'; Franco Chivilo (yellow card) 64'; Ridhuan Muhammad (yellow card) 83'	Referee: Irwan Samsuddin

16 March 2014 3	(Singapore) Tampines Rovers	3–0	(Singapore) Geylang International	Clementi Stadium
19:30 (UTC+8)	Mrdaković 16'; Closa González 30'; Đurić 42'; Taha (yellow card) 50'; Esah (yellow card) 53'	Report	Franco Chiviló (yellow card) 20'	Referee: Muhd Jahari

20 March 2014 4	(Singapore) Geylang International	1–0	(Singapore) Courts Young Lions	Bedok Stadium
19:30 (UTC+8)	Sheikh Abdul Hadi 3' (o.g.); Shah Hirul (yellow card) 47'; Wyldan Wisam (yellow card) 57'; Hamqaamal Shah (yellow card) 68'; Franco Chivilo (yellow card) 69'	Report	Iqbal Hamid Hussain (yellow card) 41'; Muhaymin Salim (yellow card) 42'; Delwinder Singh (yellow card) 76'; Anumanthan Kumar (yellow card) 79'; Jordan Webb (red card) 87'; Syazwan Buhari (yellow card) 90'	Referee: Irwan Samsuddin

28 March 2014 5	(Singapore) Geylang International	1–1	Brunei DPMM	Bedok Stadium
19:30 (UTC+8)	Yuki Ichikawa 17'; Mustaqim Manzur (yellow card) 82'	Report	Rodrigo Tosi 21'; Rodrigo Antonio Tosi (yellow card) 30'; Subhi Abdilah (yellow card) 90'; Boris Raspudic (yellow card) 90'	Referee: Ahmad A'Qashah

3 April 2013 6	(Malaysia) Harimau Muda B	0–3	(Singapore) Geylang International	Pasir Gudang Stadium
20:45 (UTC+8)	Nor Azam (yellow card) 35'; Azrul Nizam (yellow card) 89'	Report	Leonel Felice 21' (yellow card) 56'; Ridhuan Muhamad 40'; Aliff Shafaein 86'	Referee: Jensen Foo

11 April 2014 7	(Singapore) Geylang International	3–2	(Singapore) Hougang United	Jalan Besar Stadium
19:30 (UTC+8)	Hamqaamal Shah (yellow card) 44'; Yuki Ichikawa (yellow card) 71'; Igor Cerina 80' (o.g.); Leonel Felice 85' 90' (yellow card) 90'; Ridhuan Muhammad (yellow card) 90'	Report	Geison Moura 21'; Azhar Sairudin (red card) 34'; Fairoz Hasan 69'; Nakatake Shunsuke (yellow card) 81'	Referee: W.Ravisanthiran

17 April 2014 8	(Singapore) Balestier Khalsa	1–1	(Singapore) Geylang International	Toa Payoh Stadium
19:30 (UTC+8)	Goran Ljubojevic 34'	Report	Mustaqim Manzur (yellow card) 40'; Leonel Felice 79'	Referee: W Ravisanthiran

26 April 2014 9	(Singapore) Geylang International	1–1	(Singapore) Woodlands Wellington	Bedok Stadium
19:30 (UTC+8)	Kento Fukuda 40'	Report	Goh Swee Swee (yellow card) 42'; Moon Soon Ho 56'; Milos Jevtic (yellow card) 71'	Referee: W Ravisanthiran

1 May 2014 10	(Singapore) Geylang International	1–1	(Singapore) Tanjong Pagar United	Bedok Stadium
19:30 (UTC+8)	Fabian Kwok (yellow card) 71'; Leonel Felice 83'	Report	Hanafi Salleh (yellow card) 19'; Ruzaini Zainal 47'; Hafiz Osman (yellow card) 70'; Masrezwan Masturi (yellow card) 74'	Referee: Jensen Foo

8 May 2014 11	(Japan) Albirex Niigata (S)	4–2	(Singapore) Geylang International	Jurong East Stadium
19:30 (UTC+8)	Kazuki Sakamoto 12'; Shuhei Hotta 54'; Joey Sim 70' (o.g.); Ridhuan Muhammad (yellow card) 90'Kento Nagasaki 80'	Report	Fabian Kwok 32'; Ridhuan Muhamad 47'; Mustaqim Mansur (red card) 85'; Hamqaamal Shah (yellow card) 88'	Referee: Muhd Taqi

=== Round 2 ===
16 May 2014 12	(Singapore) Geylang International	0–1	(Singapore) Warriors FC	Bedok Stadium
19:30 (UTC+8)	Joaquin Lopez (yellow card) 71'	Report	Nicholas Velez 39'; Zulfadli Zainal Abidin (yellow card) 40'	Attendance: W Ravisanthiran

22 May 2014 13	(Singapore) Geylang International	1–4	(Singapore) Home United	Bedok Stadium
19:30 (UTC+8)	Kento Fukuda 16'	Report	Sirina Camara (yellow card) 15'; Da-Kyung Kwon 30' 42'; Fazrul Nawas 37' 90'	Referee: Daniel Ong

6 June 2014 14	(Singapore) Geylang International	1–0	(Singapore) Tampines Rovers	Jalan Besar Stadium
19:30 (UTC+8)	Franco Chivilo (yellow card) 36'; Yuki Ichikawa 86'	Report	Mustafic Fahrudin (yellow card) 29'	Referee: W Ravisanthiran

9 June 2014 15	(Singapore) Courts Young Lions	0–0	(Singapore) Geylang International	Jalan Besar Stadium
19:30 (UTC+8)		Report	Fabian Kwok (yellow card) 11'; Fuad Ramli (yellow card) 82'	Referee: W Ravisanthiran

14 June 2014 16	Brunei DPMM	0–0	(Singapore) Geylang International	Sultan Hassanal Bolkiah Stadium
20:10 (UTC+8)	Boris Raspudić (yellow card) 39'	Report		Referee: W Ravisanthiran

19 June 2013 17	(Singapore) Geylang International	2–3	(Malaysia) Harimau Muda B	Bedok Stadium
19:30 (UTC+8)	Fabian Kwok (yellow card) 39'; Leonel Felice 83' (pen.); Kento Fukuda 85'	Report	Shahrul Samsudin 38'; Syawal Nordin 41' (yellow card) 57'; Ashmawi Yakin (yellow card) 82'; Ramzi Sufian 90'	Referee: Muhd Jahari

23 June 2014 18	(Singapore) Hougang United	2–0	(Singapore) Geylang International	Hougang Stadium
19:30 (UTC+8)	Diego Gama 13'; Geison Moura 57' (yellow card) 59'	Report	Fabian Kwok (yellow card) 64'

31 July 2014 19	(Singapore) Geylang International	1–2	(Singapore) Balestier Khalsa	Jalan Besar Stadium
19:30 (UTC+8)	Kento Fukuda 58'	Report	Kim Min-ho 41'; Tajeli Salamat (yellow card) 64'; Zulkiffli Hassim 69'; Alando Nicholas (yellow card) 71'; Emir Lotinac (yellow card) 78'	Referee: Lim Kok Heng

22 August 2014 20	(Singapore) Woodlands Wellington	0–2	(Singapore) Geylang International	Jalan Besar Stadium
19:30 (UTC+8)	Jang Jo-yoon (yellow card) 30'; Miloš Jevtić (yellow card) 34' (yellow-red card); Stefan Milojević (yellow card) 55'	Report	Aliff Shafaein 28'; Leonel Felice (yellow card) 31'; Ridhuan Muhammad 78'; Shah Hirul (yellow card) 87'; Hyder Ismail (yellow card) 90'	Referee: Muhd Jahari

25 August 2014 21	(Singapore) Tanjong Pagar United	1–2	(Singapore) Geylang International	Queenstown Stadium
19:30 (UTC+8)	Firdaus Idros 58'; Hanafi Salleh (yellow card) 60'; Zahid Ahmad (yellow card) 66'; Hafiz Osman (yellow card) 75'	Report	Leonel Felice 5' 61'	Referee: Jansen Foo

28 August 2014 22	(Singapore) Geylang International	3–4	(Japan) Albirex Niigata (S)	Bedok Stadium
19:30 (UTC+8)	Kento Fukuda 16' 39'; Leonel Felice 35'	Report	Kazuki Sakamoto 44'; Koki Akasaka 58'; Keisuke Ota 70'; Hiroki Morisaki (yellow card) 81'; Norihiro Kawakami 90+4'	Referee: Muhd Farhad

=== Round 2.5 ===
19 September 2014 23	(Singapore) Geylang International	1–1	(Singapore) Tanjong Pagar United FC	Bedok Stadium
19:30 (UTC+8)	Leonel Felice 39'; Franco Chivilo (yellow card) 50'	Report	Asraf Rashid (yellow card) 14'; Siddiq Durimi 30' (o.g.); Hanafi Salleh (yellow card) 32'; Sazali Salleh (yellow card) 38'; Ahmad Latiff (yellow card) 85' (yellow-red card); Sebastien Etiemble (yellow card) 87'	Referee: Muhd Taqi

3 October 2014 24	(Singapore) Geylang International	2–1	(Singapore) Woodlands Wellington FC	Jalan Besar Stadium
19:30 (UTC+8)	Leonel Felice 12'; Fabian Kwok 36'	Report	Milos Jevtic (yellow card) 15'; Fadhil Noh 68'; Zulkarnain Malik (yellow card) 85'	Referee: Muhd Farhad

15 October 2014 25	(Singapore) Harimau Muda B	1–2	(Singapore) Geylang International FC	Pasir Gudang Stadium
20:45 (UTC+8)	Syafwan Shahlan 12'; Akhir Bahari (yellow card) 57'; Asri Mardzuki (yellow card) 90'	Report	Hafiz Nor 13'; Kento Fukuda 65'; Ridhuan Muhamad 68'	Referee: Muhd Syahir

21 October 2014 22	(Singapore) Geylang International	0–4	(Singapore) Hougang United	Bedok Stadium
19:30 (UTC+8)	Yuki Ichikawa (yellow card) 16'; Franco Chivilo (yellow card) 76'	Report	Fazli Jaffar (yellow card) 28'; Kento Fukuda 40' (o.g.); Geison Moura 50' 76'; Firman Hanif 53'	Referee: Muhd Taqi

25 October 2015 27	(Singapore) Young Lions	1–1	(Singapore) Geylang International	Jalan Besar Stadium
19:30 (UTC+8)	Al-Qaasimy Rahman (yellow card) 61'; Anumanthan Kumar (yellow card) 68'; Iqbal Hussein 74'	Report	Leonel Felice 33'; Ridhuan Muhamad (yellow card) 57'	Referee: G.Letchman

== Singapore League Cup ==
7 July 2014 Group Stage	(Singapore) Geylang International	2–1	(Singapore) Tampines Rovers	Jalan Besar Stadium
20:00 (UTC+8)	Siddiq Durimi (yellow card) 65'; Mustaqim Manzur 71'; Leonel Felice 75'		Jozef Kaplan 8'	Referee: Ahmad A'Qashah

15 July 2014 Group Stage	(Singapore) Warriors FC	0–4	(Singapore) Geylang International	Choa Chu Kang Stadium
20:00 (UTC+8)	Basit Mansoor (yellow card) 57'; Gavin Tan (yellow card) 62'		Neezam Aziz 35' (o.g.); Thorsten Schneider 49'; Franco Chiviló (yellow card) 60'; Leonel Felice (yellow card) 72'; Fuad Ramli 86'; Hafiz Nor 90'	Referee: Jansen Foo

18 July 2014 Quarter-finals	(Singapore) Geylang International	3–1	(Japan) Albirex Niigata Singapore	Jalan Besar Stadium
20:00 (UTC+8)	Kento Fukuda 20'; Leonel Felice 54' (pen.); Hafiz Nor 90'		Norihiro Kawakami 70'	Referee: W. Ravisanthiran

21 July 2014 Semi-finals	(Singapore) Geylang International	0–0 (a.e.t.) (0–3 p)	Brunei DPMM	Jalan Besar Stadium
20:00 (UTC+8)				Referee: Sukbir Singh
	Penalties
	Leonel Felice (penalty missed); Khairulnizam Jumahat (penalty missed); Hafiz Nor (penalty missed)		(penalty scored) R. O'Donovan; (penalty missed) Rodrigo Tosi; (penalty scored) Robert Alviz; (penalty scored) Joe Gamble

== Singapore Cup ==
27 May 2014 First round	(Singapore) Woodlands Wellington	1–5	(Singapore) Geylang International	Woodlands
19:30 (UTC+8)	Chang Joo Yoon 42'; Milos Jevtic (yellow card) 53'		Khairulnizam Jumahat 15'; Leonel Felice 32'; Ridhuan Muhamad (yellow card) 45'; Mustaqim Manzur 50'; Aliff Shafaein 53'; Hazir Nor 70'	Stadium: (Singapore) Woodlands Stadium

28 June 2014 Quarter-finals (1st Leg)	(Singapore) Balestier Khalsa	2–1	(Singapore) Geylang International	Toa Payoh
19:30 (UTC+8)	Goran Ljubojevic 64' (pen.); Kim Minho 77'		Emir Lotinac 6' (o.g.)	Stadium: (Singapore) Toa Payoh Stadium; Referee: Ahmad A'Qashah

2 July 2014 Quarter-finals (2nd Leg)	(Singapore) Geylang International	1–0 (a.e.t.) (3–4 p)	(Singapore) Balestier Khalsa	Kallang
20:00(UTC+8)	Joaquin Lopez 58'			Stadium: (Singapore) Jalan Besar Stadium; Referee: Jansen Foo
	Penalties
	Leonel Felice (penalty scored); Mustaqim Mansur (penalty scored); Fabian Kwok (penalty scored); Ridhuan Muhammad (penalty missed); Kento Fukuda (penalty missed)		Park Kang Jin (penalty missed); Emir Lotinac (penalty scored); Kim Minho (penalty scored); Nurullah Hussein (penalty scored); Syed Thaha (penalty scored)

== Squad statistics ==
=== Appearances and goals ===
No.	Pos	Nat	Player	Total		S-League		League Cup		RHB Singapore Cup	
No.	Pos	Nat	Player	Apps	Goals	Apps	Goals	Apps	Goals	Apps	Goals
2	DF	(Singapore) SGP	Khairulnizam Jumahat	19	1	8+5	0	1+2	0	3	1
3	DF	(Japan) JPN	Yuki Ichikawa	30	2	24	2	3	0	3	0
4	DF	(Singapore) SGP	Hamqaamal Shah	14	0	10+3	0	0	0	0+1	0
5	DF	(Japan) JPN	Kento Fukuda	31	8	24	7	4	1	3	0
6	MF	(Germany) GER	Thorsten Schneider	6	1	2	0	4	1	0	0
7	MF	(Singapore) SGP	Mustaqim Manzur	30	2	22+2	0	3	1	3	1
8	DF	(Singapore) SGP	Jalal Jasim	22	0	8+10	0	0+1	0	1+2	0
9	FW	(Argentina) ARG	Leonel Felice	33	16	26	13	4	2	3	1
10	MF	(Argentina) ARG	Franco Chivilo	30	0	26	0	1	0	2+1	0
11	MF	(Singapore) SGP	Hafiz Nor	33	4	19+7	2	4	2	2+1	0
12	MF	(Singapore) SGP	Fabian Kwok	27	2	20+1	2	3	0	3	0
14	MF	(Singapore) SGP	K.Satiaraj	0	0	0	0	0	0	0	0
15	MF	(Singapore) SGP	Shah Hirul	23	0	12+8	0	2	0	0+1	0
16	DF	(Singapore) SGP	Wyldan Wisam	4	0	4	0	0	0	0	0
17	MF	(Singapore) SGP	Aliff Shafaein	26	3	14+9	2	2	0	1	1
18	FW	(Singapore) SGP	Ridhuan Muhammad	34	3	27	3	4	0	3	0
19	GK	(Singapore) SGP	Joey Sim	21	0	17	0	3	0	0+1	0
21	GK	(Singapore) SGP	Siddiq Durimi	16	0	11+1	0	1	0	3	0

=== Goalscorers ===
Rank	Pos.	No.	Player	S.League	League Cup	Singapore Cup	Total
1	FW	9	(Argentina) Leonel Felice	13	2	1	16
2	DF	5	(Japan) Kento Fukuda	7	1	0	8
3	MF	11	(Singapore) Hafiz Nor	2	2	1	5
4	MF	19	(Singapore) Ridhuan Muhamad	3	0	0	3
4	MF	17	(Singapore) Aliff Shafaein	2	0	1	3
5	DF	3	(Japan) Yuki Ichikawa	2	0	0	2
5	DF	12	(Singapore) Fabian Kwok	2	0	0	2
5	DF	7	(Singapore) Mustaqim Manzur	0	1	1	2
6	DF	2	(Singapore) Khairulnizam Jumahat	0	0	1	1
6	MF	6	(Germany) Thorsten Schneider	0	1	0	1
Own Goals				2	1	1	4
TOTALS				33	8	6	47

=== Disciplinary record ===
No.	Pos.	Name	S.League		League Cup		Singapore Cup		Total	
No.	Pos.	Name	Yellow card	Red card	Yellow card	Red card	Yellow card	Red card	Yellow card	Red card
2	DF	(Singapore) Khairulnizam Jumahat	0	0	0	0	0	0	0	0
3	DF	(Japan) Yuki Ichikawa	1	0	0	0	0	0	1	0
4	DF	(Singapore) Hamqaamal Shah	3	0	0	0	0	0	3	0
5	DF	(Japan) Kento Fukuda	0	0	0	0	0	0	0	0
6	DF	(Argentina) Joaquin Lopez	1	0	0	0	0	0	1	0
7	MF	(Singapore) Mustaqim Manzur	2	1	0	0	0	0	2	1
8	DF	(Singapore) Jalal Jasim	0	0	0	0	0	0	0	0
9	FW	(Argentina) Leonel Felice	2	0	0	0	0	0	2	0
10	MF	(Argentina) Franco Chivilo	4	0	0	0	0	0	4	0
11	MF	(Singapore) Hafiz Nor	0	0	0	0	0	0	0	0
12	MF	(Singapore) Fabian Kwok	1	0	0	0	0	0	1	0
14	DF	(Singapore) K.Sathiaraj	0	0	0	0	0	0	0	0
15	MF	(Singapore) Shah Hirul	1	0	0	0	0	0	1	0
16	DF	(Singapore) Wyldan Wisam	1	0	0	0	0	0	1	0
17	FW	(Singapore) Aliff Shafaein	0	0	0	0	0	1	0	1
18	MF	(Singapore) Ridhuan Muhammad	2	0	0	0	1	0	3	0
19	GK	(Singapore) Joey Sim	0	0	0	0	0	0	0	0
20	MF	(Singapore) Jonathan Tan	0	0	0	0	0	0	0	0
21	GK/DF	(Singapore) Siddiq Durimi	0	0	0	0	0	0	0	0

== Awards ==
=== Eagles Player of the Month Award ===
Month	Player	Ref
March		
April	(Argentina) Leonel Felice	
May	(Singapore) Fabian Kwok	
June		
July	(Singapore) Hafiz Nor	
August		
September		
October		

=== S.League Night Awards ===
Award	Name of Player	Ref
Tiger Beer Goal of the Year	(Singapore) Fabian Kwok	
