= 2014 Singapore Cup =

RHB Singapore Cup

Tournament details
- Country: Singapore
- Dates: 25 May – 7 November 2014
- Teams: 16

Final positions
- Champions: Balestier Khalsa
- Runners-up: Home United
- Third place: (Brunei) DPMM FC

Tournament statistics
- Matches played: 22
- Goals scored: 66 (3 per match)
- Attendance: 13,513 (614 per match)
- Top goal scorer: Roy O'Donovan (5 goals)

The 2014 Singapore Cup is the 17th season of Singapore's annual premier club football tournament organised by Football Association of Singapore. Due to sponsorship reasons, the Singapore Cup is also known as the RHB Singapore Cup. Home United are the defending champions, having won the trophy six times.

Balestier Khalsa won the Cup with a 3-1 win over defending champion Home United.

== Teams ==
A total of 16 teams participate in the 2014 Singapore Cup. Eleven of the teams are from domestic S.League and the other five are invited from the Philippines, Cambodia and Laos. Courts Young Lions will not participate in this year's edition of Singapore Cup.

S.League Clubs

- (Japan) Albirex Niigata (S)
- Balestier Khalsa
- (Brunei) DPMM FC
- Geylang International
- (Malaysia) Harimau Muda B
- Home United
- Hougang United
- Tampines Rovers
- Tanjong Pagar United
- Warriors FC
- Woodlands Wellington
- (Singapore) Young Lions

Invited Foreign Teams

- (Philippines) Global FC
- (Philippines) Loyola Meralco Sparks
- (Cambodia) Nagacorp FC
- (Laos) SHB Champasak
- (Cambodia) Svay Rieng

== Format ==
The sixteen teams were drawn into two distinct pools for the preliminary round. They will play against one another in a single-legged knockout basis. Winners of this round will progress and advance to the quarter-finals. Thereafter, matches are played in two legs with the exception of the one-match finals. Unlike the previous season, away goals rule does not apply.

For any match in the knockout stage, a draw after 90 minutes of regulation time is followed by two 15 minute periods of extra time to determine a winner. If the teams are still tied, a penalty shoot-out is held to determine a winner.

== Knockout phase ==
=== Bracket ===
Preliminary round
(Malaysia) Harimau Muda B | 1
Tampines Rovers | 1
Tanjong Pagar United | 1
Hougang United | 0
Warriors FC | 1
Balestier Khalsa | 3
Woodlands Wellington | 1
Geylang International | 5
(Cambodia) Svay Rieng | 0
(Japan) Albirex Niigata (S) | 3
(Philippines) Global FC | 0
(Brunei) DPMM FC | 7
Home United | 5
(Cambodia) Nagacorp FC | 0
(Philippines) Loyola | 7
(Laos) Champasak | 1

Quarter-finals
Tampines Rovers | 4 | 4 | 8
Tanjong Pagar United | 2 | 1 | 3
Balestier Khalsa | 2 | 0 | 2 (5)
Geylang International | 1 | 1 | 2 (4)
(Japan) Albirex Niigata (S) | 3 | 1 | 4
(Brunei) DPMM FC | 4 | 2 | 6
Home United | 2 | 2 | 4
(Philippines) Loyola | 0 | 1 | 1

Semi-finals
Tampines Rovers | 2 | 0 | 2 (1)
Balestier Khalsa | 1 | 1 | 2 (4)
(Brunei) DPMM FC | 1 | 2 | 3
Home United | 1 | 3 | 4

Final
Balestier Khalsa | 3
Home United | 1

=== Preliminary round ===
In the preliminary round, teams were drawn into two distinct pools. They played against one another in a single leg knockout basis. The draw for the preliminary round was held on 3 May 2014. The matches were played from 25 May to 1 June 2014. Winners of this round progressed and advanced to the quarter-finals.

| Team 1 | Score | Team 2 |
|---|---|---|
Pool A
| Harimau Muda B (Malaysia) | 1–1 (5–6 p.) | Tampines Rovers |
| Tanjong Pagar United | 1–0 | Hougang United |
| Woodlands Wellington | 1–5 | Geylang International |
| Warriors FC | 1–3 | Balestier Khalsa |
Pool B
| Svay Rieng (Cambodia) | 0–3 | (Japan) Albirex Niigata (S) |
| Home United | 5–0 | (Cambodia) Nagacorp FC |
| Global FC (Philippines) | 0–7 | (Brunei) DPMM FC |
| Loyola Meralco Sparks (Philippines) | 7–1 | (Laos) SHB Champasak |

Pool A

| 29 May 2014 | Harimau Muda B (Malaysia) | 1–1 (a.e.t.) (5–6 p) | Tampines Rovers | Jalan Besar Stadium, Kallang |
| 19:30 | Ramzi 120' | Report | Alam Shah 117' | Attendance: 1,142; Referee: Jansen Foo (SIN) |
| | Penalties |
| | Rosli (penalty scored); Azam (penalty missed); Ramadhan (penalty scored); Igwan (penalty scored); Hardee (penalty scored); Ramzi (penalty scored); Akhir (penalty missed) | | (penalty missed) Fahrudin; (penalty scored) Closa; (penalty scored) Mrdaković; (penalty scored) Shahdan; (penalty scored) Alam Shah; (penalty scored) Ismadi; (penalty scored) Jamil |

| 26 May 2014 | Tanjong Pagar United | 1–0 | Hougang United | Queenstown Stadium, Queenstown |
| 19:30 | Zerka 76' | Report | | Attendance: 560; Referee: Jansen Foo (SIN) |

| 31 May 2014 | Woodlands Wellington | 1–5 | Geylang International | Woodlands Stadium, Woodlands |
| 19:30 | Chang 42' (pen.) | Report | Khairulnizam 15'; Felice 33'; Mustaqim 50'; Shafaein 52'; Hafiz 70' | Attendance: 881; Referee: Jansen Foo (SIN) |

| 27 May 2014 | Warriors FC | 1–3 | Balestier Khalsa | Choa Chu Kang Stadium, Choa Chu Kang |
| 19:30 | Pejić 30' | Report | Zulkiffli 6'; Ljubojević 62'; Park 77' | Attendance: 1,166; Referee: Jansen Foo (SIN) |

=== Quarter-finals ===
| Team 1 | Agg. | Team 2 | 1st leg | 2nd leg |
|---|---|---|---|---|
| Tampines Rovers | 8–3 | Tanjong Pagar United | 4–2 | 4–1 |
| Balestier Khalsa | 2–2 (5–4 p.) | Geylang International | 2–1 | 0–1 |
| Albirex Niigata (S) (Japan) | 4–6 | (Brunei) DPMM FC | 3–4 | 1–2 |
| Home United | 4–1 | (Philippines) Loyola Meralco Sparks | 2–0 | 2–1 |

27 June 2014
19:30

| Tampines Rovers | 4–2 | Tanjong Pagar United |
|---|---|---|
| Mrdaković 26'; Jamil 54', 69'; Kapláň 90' | Report | Idros 45'; Zerka 65' (pen.) |

Jalan Besar Stadium, Kallang
Attendance: 1,288
Referee: Jansen Foo (SIN)

28 June 2014
19:30

| Balestier Khalsa | 2–1 | Geylang International |
|---|---|---|
| Ljubojević 62'; Kim 77' | Report | Hafiz 6' |

Toa Payoh Stadium, Toa Payoh
Attendance: 706
Referee: Jansen Foo (SIN)

29 June 2014
20:00

| Albirex Niigata (S) (Japan) | 3–4 | (Brunei) DPMM FC |
|---|---|---|
| Okazaki 34'; Ota 56'; Sakamoto 63' | Report | Alviž 5'; Gamble 8'; Tosi 17'; O'Donovan 90+3' |

Jurong West Stadium, Jurong
Attendance: 2,511
Referee: Jansen Foo (SIN)

30 June 2014
20:00

| Home United | 2–0 | (Philippines) Loyola Sparks |
|---|---|---|
| Qiu Li 62'; Hanapi 66' | Report |

Bishan Stadium, Bishan
Attendance: 2,009
Referee: Jansen Foo (SIN)

1 July 2014
20:00

| Tanjong Pagar United | 1–4 | Tampines Rovers |
|---|---|---|
| Etiemble 62' (pen.) | Report | Anaz 33'; Mrdaković 42'; Kapláň 84'; Alam Shah 90' |

Queenstown Stadium, Queenstown
Attendance: 563
Referee: Jansen Foo (SIN)

2 July 2014
20:00

| Geylang International | 1–0 (a.e.t.) | Balestier Khalsa |
|---|---|---|
| Lopez 59' | Report |
Penalties
| Felice (penalty scored); Mustaqim (penalty scored); Fabian (penalty scored); Ridhuan (penalty missed); Fukuda (penalty missed) | 3–4 | (penalty missed) Park; (penalty scored) Lotinac; (penalty scored) Kim; (penalty scored) Nurullah; (penalty scored) Thaha |

Jalan Besar Stadium, Kallang
Attendance: 1,028
Referee: Jansen Foo (SIN)

3 July 2014
20:00

| Loyola Sparks (Philippines) | 1–2 | Home United |
|---|---|---|
| P. Younghusband 58' | Report | Lee 20' (pen.); Qiu Li 27' |

Jalan Besar Stadium, Kallang
Attendance: 2,455
Referee: Jansen Foo (SIN)

4 July 2014
20:00

| DPMM FC (Brunei) | 2–1 | (Japan) Albirex Niigata (S) |
|---|---|---|
| Tosi 17'; Azwan 26' | Report | Kawakami 86' |

Jalan Besar Stadium, Kallang
Attendance: 2,953
Referee: Jansen Foo (SIN)

=== Semi-finals ===
| Team 1 | Agg. | Team 2 | 1st leg | 2nd leg |
|---|---|---|---|---|
| Tampines Rovers | 2-2 (1-4) | Balestier Khalsa | 2-1 | 0-1 |
| DPMM FC (Brunei) | 3-4 | Home United | 1-1 | 2-3 |

22 September 2014
19:30

| Tampines Rovers | 2-1 | Balestier Khalsa |
|---|---|---|
| Mrdaković 18'; Ali 71' | Report | Park 52' |

Clementi Stadium, Clementi
Referee: Ahmad A'Qashah (SIN)

23 September 2014
19:30

| DPMM FC (Brunei) | 1-1 | Home United |
|---|---|---|
| O'Donovan 75' | Report | Lee 37' (pen.) |

Jalan Besar Stadium, Kallang
Referee: Jansen Foo (SIN)

25 September 2014
19:30

| Balestier Khalsa | 1-0 (a.e.t.) | Tampines Rovers |
|---|---|---|
| Cunningham 62' | Report |
Penalties
| | 4–1 |

Clementi Stadium, Clementi
Referee: Farhad Mohd (SIN)

26 September 2014
19:30

| Home United | 3-2 | (Brunei) DPMM FC |
|---|---|---|
| Camara 45'; Noh Rahman 64'; Song 89' | Report | O'Donovan 5'; Tosi 35' (pen.) |

Jalan Besar Stadium, Kallang
Referee: Jansen Foo (SIN)

=== Third place play-off ===
6 November 2014
19:30

| Tampines Rovers | 1-2 | (Brunei) DPMM FC |
|---|---|---|
| | Report |

Jalan Besar Stadium, Kallang
Referee: Jansen Foo (SIN)

=== Final ===
7 November 2014
20:00

| Balestier Khalsa | 3-1 | Home United |
|---|---|---|
| Ljubojević 15'; Kim 28' (pen.); Park 89' | Report | Camara 90' |

Jalan Besar Stadium, Kallang
Referee: Muhammad Taqi (SIN)

== Statistics ==
=== Goalscorers ===
As of matches played 4 July 2014

5 goals

- (Republic of Ireland) Roy O'Donovan (DPMM)

4 goals

- (Brazil) Rodrigo Tosi (DPMM)

3 goals

- (Philippines) James Younghusband (LMS)

2 goals

- (Japan) Kazuki Sakamoto (ALB)
- (Japan) Kazuya Okazaki (ALB)
- (Croatia) Goran Ljubojević (BAL)
- Hafiz Nor (GLI)
- (South Korea) Lee Kwan-woo (HOM)
- Qiu Li (HOM)
- (Philippines) Alfredo Razon Gonzalez (LMS)
- (Philippines) Phil Younghusband (LMS)
- Jamil Ali (TAM)
- (Slovenia) Jozef Kapláň (TAM)
- (Serbia) Miljan Mrdaković (TAM)
- Noh Alam Shah (TAM)
- (France) Monsef Zerka (TPU)

1 goal

- (Japan) Kazuya Fukuzaki (ALB)
- (Japan) Keisuke Ota (ALB)
- (Japan) Norihiro Kawakami (ALB)
- (South Korea) Kim Min-ho (BAL)
- (South Korea) Park Kang-Jin (BAL)
- Zulkiffli Hassim (BAL)
- (Brunei) Azwan Ali (DPMM)
- (Brunei) Azwan Saleh (DPMM)
- (Croatia) Robert Alviž (DPMM)
- (Brunei) Shahrazen Said (DPMM)
- Aliff Shafaein (GLI)
- (Argentina) Joaquin Lopez (GLI)
- Khairulnizam Jumahat (GLI)
- Leonel Felice (GLI)
- Mustaqim Manzur (GLI)
- Ahmed Fahmie (HOM)
- Fazli Ayob (HOM)
- Fazrul Nawaz (HOM)
- Indra Sahdan Daud (HOM)
- Yasir Hanapi (HOM)
- (Malaysia) Ramzi Sufian (HMB)
- (Democratic Republic of the Congo) Itubu Imbem (CHP)
- Anaz Hadee (TAM)
- Firdaus Idros (TPU)
- (France) Sébastien Etiemble (TPU)
- (Croatia) Miroslav Pejić (WAR)
- (South Korea) Chang Jo-yoon (WLW)

Own goals

- (Laos) Sonxay Simoulay (against Loyola Meralco Sparks)

Source: S.League

=== Hat-tricks ===
As of matches played 4 July 2014

| Player | For | Against | Result | Date |
|---|---|---|---|---|
| (Republic of Ireland) Roy O'Donovan | DPMM FC | Global | 7–0 | 1 June 2014 |
| (Philippines) James Younghusband | Loyola Meralco Sparks | SHB Champasak | 7–1 | 2 June 2014 |

=== Discipline ===
The following players are currently suspended from tournament matches:

| Player | Club | Offence | Suspension |
|---|---|---|---|
| Jufri | Tampines | (yellow card) Cautioned in second match; vs Tanjong Pagar (1 July) | One match; vs Balestier (22 Sept) |
| Ruhaizad | Balestier | (yellow card) Cautioned in second match; vs Geylang Int'l (2 July) | One match; vs Tampines (22 Sept) |
| (Republic of Ireland) Gamble | DPMM | (yellow card) Cautioned in second match; vs Albirex Niigata (S) (4 July) | One match; vs Home (23 Sept) |
