= 2014 Tampines Rovers FC season =

Tampines Rovers
- Chairman: Teo Hock Seng
- Manager: Nenad Bacina
- S.League: –
- AFC Cup: Group stage
Home colours	Away colours

The 2014 Tampines Rovers season saw the team compete in the 2014 S.League. They also competed in the 2014 AFC Cup after winning the 2014 S.League.

== Squad ==
As of 6 January 2014.

=== Sleague ===
No.	Name	Nationality	Date of birth (age)	Previous club
Goalkeepers
1	Hyrulnizam Juma'at	(Singapore)	14 November 1986 (age 39)	(Singapore) Warriors FC
13	Ridhuan Barudin	(Singapore)	23 March 1987 (age 38)	(Singapore) Geylang International
16	Justin Pasfield	(Australia)	30 May 1985 (age 40)	(Australia) Central Coast Mariners
Defenders
2	Ismadi Mukhtar	(Singapore)	16 December 1983 (age 42)	(Singapore) Woodlands Wellington
3	Jufri Taha	(Singapore)	4 March 1985 (age 41)	(Singapore) Balestier Khalsa
4	Fahrudin Mustafic	(Singapore)	17 April 1981 (age 44)	(Indonesia) Persela Lamongan
5	Shariff Abdul Samat	(Singapore)	5 January 1984 (age 42)	(Singapore) Woodlands Wellington
6	Kunihiro Yamashita	(Japan)	29 May 1986 (age 39)	(Singapore) Albirex Niigata (S)
7	Shaiful Esah	(Singapore)	12 May 1986 (age 39)	(Singapore) LionsXII
11	Imran Sahib	(Singapore)	12 October 1982 (age 43)	(Singapore) Woodlands Wellington
12	Anaz Hadee	(Singapore)	24 September 1983 (age 42)	(Singapore) Balestier Khalsa
22	Abdil Qaiyyim Mutalib	(Singapore)	14 May 1989 (age 36)	(Singapore) Warriors FC
26	Ashada Muhammad	(Singapore)		Youth Team
37	Izzat Hamzah	(Singapore)		Youth Team
Midfielders
8	Shahdan Sulaiman	(Singapore)	9 May 1988 (age 37)	(Singapore) LionsXII
14	Matthew Abraham	(Singapore)	5 March 1989 (age 37)	(Singapore) Warriors FC
15	Jake Butler	(New Zealand)	12 November 1984 (age 41)	(New Zealand) Waitakere United
17	Jamil Ali	(Singapore)	2 May 1984 (age 41)	(Singapore) Woodlands Wellington
20	Ang Zhiwei	(Singapore)	2 August 1989 (age 36)	(Singapore) Woodlands Wellington
31	Syafiq Siraj	(Singapore)	23 January 1993 (age 33)	Youth Team
34	Christopher van Huizen	(Singapore)	28 November 1992 (age 33)	Youth Team
41	Joseph Taylor	(Australia)	22 July 1996 (age 29)	Youth Team
Forwards
9	Aleksandar Duric	(Singapore) (Australia) (Serbia)	12 August 1970 (age 55)	(Singapore) SAFSA
10	Miljan Mrdaković	(Serbia)	6 May 1982 (age 43)	(Greece) Veria F.C.
18	Noh Alam Shah	(Singapore)	3 September 1980 (age 45)	(Indonesia) PSS Sleman
21	Jozef Kapláň	(Slovenia)	2 April 1986 (age 39)	(Malaysia) Negeri Sembilan FA
23	Cameron Ayrton Bell	(Singapore)	18 April 1994 (age 31)	Youth Team
25	Khalili D'Cruz	(Singapore)	14 August 1991 (age 34)	Youth Team
39	Taufik Suparno	(Singapore) (Indonesia)	31 October 1995 (age 30)	Youth Team
Players who left club during season
15	Firdaus Kasman	(Singapore)	24 January 1988 (age 38)	(Singapore) LionsXII
16	Norihiro Kawakami	(Japan)	4 April 1987 (age 38)	(Singapore) Geylang International
19	Roberto Martínez Gamarra	(Paraguay)	7 June 1985 (age 40)	(Paraguay) Independiente F.B.C.
21	Luis Closa	(Paraguay)	10 March 1984 (age 42)	(Paraguay) Club Sportivo San Lorenzo

== Transfers ==
=== Transfers ===
==== In ====
Position	Player	Transferred To	Ref
GK	(Singapore) Hyrulnizam Juma'at	(Singapore) Warriors FC	
DF	(Japan) Norihiro Kawakami	(Singapore) Geylang International	
DF	(Singapore) Abdil Qaiyyim Mutalib	(Singapore) Warriors FC	
DF	(Singapore) Shariff Abdul Samat	(Singapore) Woodlands Wellington	
MF	(Paraguay) Luis Closa	(Paraguay) Club Sportivo San Lorenzo	
MF	(Australia) Joseph Taylor	Free Agent	
MF	(Singapore) Matthew Abraham	(Singapore) Warriors FC	
MF	(Singapore) Ang Zhiwei	(Singapore) Woodlands Wellington	
FW	(Serbia) Miljan Mrdaković	(Greece) Veria F.C.	
FW	(Singapore) Noh Alam Shah	(Indonesia) PSS Sleman	
FW	(Paraguay) Roberto Martínez Gamarra	(Paraguay) Independiente F.B.C.	
GK	(Australia) Justin Pasfield	(Australia) Central Coast Mariners FC	Mid season
MF	(New Zealand) Jake Butler	(New Zealand) Waitakere United	Mid season
FW	(Slovenia) Jozef Kapláň	(Malaysia) Negeri Sembilan FA	Mid season

==== Out ====
Position	Player	Transferred To	Ref
GK	(Portugal) André Martins	(Portugal) S.U. Sintrense	
DF	(Japan) Seiji Kaneko	(Thailand) Angthong F.C.	
DF	(Singapore) Shannon Stephen	NS	
MF	(Portugal) Vítor Ladeiras	(Portugal)	
MF	(Singapore) (Malaysia) Ruzaini Zainal	(Singapore) Hougang United	
FW	(Portugal) Diogo Caramelo	(Portugal) G.D. Ribeirão	
FW	(Singapore) Khairul Amri	(Singapore) LionsXII	
FW	(Singapore) Ahmed Fahmie	(Singapore) Home United	
DF	(Japan) Norihiro Kawakami	(Singapore) Albirex Niigata (S)	Mid season
MF	(Singapore) Firdaus Kasman	(Singapore) LionsXII	Mid season
MF	(Paraguay) Luis Closa	(Bolivia) Club San José	Mid season
FW	(Paraguay) Roberto Martínez Gamarra	(Argentina) Crucero del Norte	Mid season

== Competitions ==
=== S.League ===
==== League table ====
Pos	Team	Pld	W	D	L	GF	GA	GD	Pts	Qualification
1	Warriors FC	27	16	5	6	53	35	+18	53	Qualification to AFC Champions League Qualifying Round 1 or AFC Cup Group Stage
2	(Brunei) DPMM FC (Note: The three foreign clubs – Albirex Niigata (S), DPMM FC and Harimau Muda B – as well as the Football Association of Singapore (FAS) under-23 team, Young Lions, are not eligible for any AFC competition spots.)	27	15	5	7	63	30	+33	50	
3	Tampines Rovers	27	14	7	6	44	32	+12	49	
4	Home United	27	13	5	9	52	41	+11	44	
5	(Japan) Albirex Niigata (S)	27	13	5	9	51	40	+11	44	

Source: RSSSF
Rules for classification: 1) points; 2) goal difference; 3) number of goals scored

=== Singapore Cup ===
29 May 2014 Round 1	Harimau Muda B (Malaysia)	1–1 (a.e.t.) (5–6 p)	Tampines Rovers	Jalan Besar Stadium, Kallang
19:30	Ramzi 120'	Report	Alam Shah 117'	Attendance: 1,142; Referee: Jansen Foo (SIN)
	Penalties
	Rosli (penalty scored); Azam (penalty missed); Ramadhan (penalty scored); Igwan (penalty scored); Hardee (penalty scored); Ramzi (penalty scored); Akhir (penalty missed)		(penalty missed) Fahrudin; (penalty scored) Closa; (penalty scored) Mrdaković; (penalty scored) Shahdan; (penalty scored) Alam Shah; (penalty scored) Ismadi; (penalty scored) Jamil

1 July 2014 Quarter Final	Tanjong Pagar United	1–4	Tampines Rovers	Queenstown Stadium, Queenstown
20:00	Etiemble 62' (pen.)	Report	Anaz 33'; Mrdaković 42'; Kapláň 84'; Alam Shah 90'	Attendance: 563; Referee: Jansen Foo (SIN)

22 September 2014 Semi Final Leg 1	Tampines Rovers	2–1	Balestier Khalsa	Clementi Stadium, Clementi
19:30	Mrdaković 18'; Ali 71'	Report	Park 52'	Referee: Ahmad A'Qashah (SIN)

25 September 2014 Semi Final Leg 2	Balestier Khalsa	1–0 (a.e.t.) (4–1 p)	Tampines Rovers	Clementi Stadium, Clementi
19:30	Cunningham 62'	Report		Referee: Farhad Mohd (SIN)

Tampines Rovers lost on penalty

6 November 2014 Third place play-off	Tampines Rovers	1–2	(Brunei) DPMM FC	Jalan Besar Stadium, Kallang
19:30		Report		Referee: Jansen Foo (SIN)

=== Group B ===
Team	Pld	W	D	L	GF	GA	GD	Pts	GLI	WAR	TAM
Geylang International	2	2	0	0	6	1	+5	6			2–1
Warriors FC	2	1	0	1	3	6	−3	3	0–4		
Tampines Rovers	2	0	0	2	3	5	−2	0		2–3	

7 July 2014	Geylang International	2–1	Tampines Rovers	Jalan Besar Stadium
20:00	Mustaqim 71'; Felice 76'	Report	Kapláň 9'	Referee: Ahmad A'Qashah (SIN)

12 July 2014	Tampines Rovers	2–3	Warriors FC	Clementi Stadium
20:00	Butler 8'; Fahrudin 23'	Report	Agu 12', 46', 51'	Referee: Farhad Mohd (SIN)

=== AFC Cup ===
Team	Pld	W	D	L	GF	GA	GD	Pts	KIT	NPT	TAM	PUN
(Hong Kong) Kitchee	6	4	1	1	15	5	+10	13		2–0	4–0	2–2
(Myanmar) Nay Pyi Taw	6	2	2	2	10	10	0	8	1–2		3–1	3–3
(Singapore) Tampines Rovers	6	2	0	4	9	16	−7	6 (Note: Tiebreakers: Tampines Rovers and Pune are ranked on head-to-head record.)	0–5	0–1		3–1
(India) Pune	6	1	3	2	12	15	−3	6	2–0	2–2	2–5	

=== Group H ===
26 February 2014	Tampines Rovers (Singapore)	0–5	(Hong Kong) Kitchee	Jalan Besar Stadium, Singapore
19:30 UTC+8		Report	Jordi 40', 45+1'; Chan Man Fai 47'; Xu Deshuai 56'; Belencoso 90'	Attendance: 712; Referee: Nagor Amir Noor Mohamed (Malaysia)

12 March 2014	Nay Pyi Taw (Myanmar)	3–1	(Singapore) Tampines Rovers	Paung Laung Stadium, Naypyidaw
16:00 UTC+6:30	Di Piedi 39'; Jung Yoon-sik 60', 67'	Report	Đurić 70'	Attendance: 1,320; Referee: Yu Ming-hsun (Chinese Taipei)

19 March 2014	Tampines Rovers (Singapore)	3–1	(India) Pune	Jalan Besar Stadium, Singapore
19:30 UTC+8	Mrdaković 38', 69'; Closa 62'	Report	Mustapha 16' (pen.)	Attendance: 778; Referee: Wang Di (China PR)

1 April 2014	Pune (India)	2–5	(Singapore) Tampines Rovers	Shree Shiv Chhatrapati Sports Complex, Pune
19:00 UTC+5:30	Mustapha 12'; D'Souza 14'	Report	Mrdaković 5'; Ali 43'; Đurić 57', 69'; Fahrudin 60' (pen.)	Attendance: 2,013; Referee: Yaqoob Abdul Baki (Oman)

8 April 2014	Kitchee (Hong Kong)	4–0	(Singapore) Tampines Rovers	Mong Kok Stadium, Hong Kong
20:00 UTC+8	Belencoso 35', 62', 85'; Jordi 82'	Report		Attendance: 1,611; Referee: Tayeb Shamsuzzaman (Bangladesh)

22 April 2014	Tampines Rovers (Singapore)	0–1	(Myanmar) Nay Pyi Taw	Jalan Besar Stadium, Singapore
19:30 UTC+8		Report	Delgado 79'	Attendance: 1,301; Referee: Jarred Gillett (Australia)
