= 2014 S.League =

S.League
- Season: 2014
- Champions: Warriors FC
- Supporters' Shield: Tampines Rovers
- AFC Champions League: Warriors FC (S.League winners)
- AFC Cup: Balestier Khalsa (Singapore Cup winners)
- Matches: 125
- Goals: 409 (3.27 per match)
- Top goalscorer: (Brazil) Rodrigo Tosi (21 goals)
- Biggest home win: (Brunei) DPMM FC 8–1 Woodlands Wellington (26 August 2014)
- Biggest away win: (Singapore) Young Lions 0–4 Balestier Khalsa (23 February 2014) (Japan) Albirex Niigata (S) 0–4 Warriors FC (16 April 2014)
- Highest scoring: (Brunei) DPMM FC 8–1 Woodlands Wellington (26 August 2014)
- Longest winning run: (Brunei) DPMM FC (7 matches)
- Longest unbeaten run: Hougang United (9 matches)
- Longest winless run: (Malaysia) Harimau Muda B (10 matches)
- Longest losing run: (Malaysia) Harimau Muda B (10 matches)
- All statistics correct as of 26 August 2014.

The 2014 S.League was the 19th season since the establishment of the S.League, the top-flight Singaporean professional league for association football clubs. The league was also known as the Great Eastern Yeo's S.League due to sponsorship reasons. Tampines Rovers were the defending champions.

For the first time, free-to-air MediaCorp okto broadcast all Friday matches that were held at the Jalan Besar Stadium live on its channel, including a weekly S.League Show. The season started on 21 February 2014, and concluded on 31 October 2014.

== Teams ==
A total of 12 teams contested the league. There were no changes to the participating sides from the previous season. Albirex Niigata (S), DPMM FC and Harimau Muda B were invited foreign clubs from Japan, Brunei and Malaysia respectively.

=== Stadiums and locations ===
Location of 2014 S.League teams
Locations of the 2014 S.League teams from Singapore

Team	Stadium	Capacity
(Japan) Albirex Niigata (S)	Jurong East Stadium	2,700
Balestier Khalsa	Toa Payoh Stadium	3,900
(Brunei) DPMM FC	Hassanal Bolkiah National Stadium	30,000
Geylang International	Bedok Stadium	3,900
(Malaysia) Harimau Muda B	Pasir Gudang Stadium	15,000
Home United	Bishan Stadium	4,100
Hougang United	Hougang Stadium	2,500
Tampines Rovers	Clementi Stadium	4,000
Tanjong Pagar United	Queenstown Stadium	3,800
Warriors FC	Choa Chu Kang Stadium	4,600
Woodlands Wellington	Woodlands Stadium	4,300
(Singapore) Young Lions	Jalan Besar Stadium	8,000

- Geylang International used the Jalan Besar stadium to host Balestier Khalsa on 31 July

=== Personnel and kits ===
Note: Flags indicate national team as has been defined under FIFA eligibility rules. Players may hold more than one non-FIFA nationality.

Team	Coach	Captain	Kit manufacturer	Shirt sponsor
(Japan) Albirex Niigata (S)	(Japan) Tatsuyuki Okuyama	(Japan) Itsuki Yamada	Mafro	Canon
Balestier Khalsa	(Croatia) Marko Kraljević	(New Zealand) Paul Cunningham	Umbro	FTMS
(Brunei) DPMM FC	(Scotland) Steve Kean	(Brunei) Rosmin Kamis	Lotto	None
Geylang International	(Germany) Jörg Steinebrunner	Muhammad Ridhuan	Lotto	Rotary Engineering
(Malaysia) Harimau Muda B	(Malaysia) Razip Ismail	(Malaysia) Ashmawi Yakin	Nike	None
Home United	(South Korea) Lee Lim-Saeng	Noh Rahman	Kappa	Coca-Cola
Hougang United	Amin Nasir	Lau Meng Meng	Macron	SPEED Institute
Tampines Rovers	Rafi Ali	Mustafić Fahrudin	Mikasa	Hyundai
Tanjong Pagar United	(France) Patrick Vallee	Hafiz Osman	THORB	SINGA Energy Drink
Warriors FC	(England) Alex Weaver	Daniel Bennett	Joma	STA Inspection
Woodlands Wellington	Salim Moin	Rosman Sulaiman	Waga	ESW Manage
(Singapore) Young Lions	Aide Iskandar	Al-Qaasimy Rahman	Nike	Courts

- The S.League uses a new match ball, the Mikasa SL450, sponsored by Mikasa.

=== Managerial changes ===
Team	Outgoing manager	Manner of departure	Replaced by	Date
Tampines Rovers	Tay Peng Kee	Mutual consent	Salim Moin	29 November 2013
Woodlands Wellington	Salim Moin	End of contract	(Australia) Darren Stewart	14 January 2014
Balestier Khalsa	(Australia) Darren Stewart	Resigned	(Croatia) Marko Kraljević	4 January 2014
(Japan) Albirex Niigata (S)	(Japan) Koichi Sugiyama	End of contract	(Japan) Tatsuyuki Okuyama	18 November
(Brunei) DPMM FC	(Croatia) Vjeran Simunić	End of contract	(Scotland) Steve Kean	20 October 2013
Geylang International	Vedhamuthu Kanan	Sacked	(Germany) Jörg Steinebrunner	20 March 2014
Tampines Rovers	Salim Moin	Resigned	Rafi Ali	28 April 2014
Woodlands Wellington	(Australia) Darren Stewart	Sacked	Salim Moin	15 June 2014

== Foreign players ==
Each club is allowed to have up to a maximum of five foreign players.

Club	Player 1	Player 2	Player 3	Player 4	Player 5	Player 6 (Prime League)	Former Player
Balestier Khalsa	(South Korea) Park Kang-jin	(South Korea) Kim Min-ho	(New Zealand) Paul Cunningham	(Serbia) Emir Lotinac	(Croatia) **Goran Ljubojević**	(England) Alando Atkinson	None
(Brunei) DPMM FC	(Brazil) Rodrigo Tosi	(Croatia) Robert Alviž	(Bosnia and Herzegovina) Boris Raspudić	(Republic of Ireland) Roy O'Donovan	(Republic of Ireland) Joe Gamble	None	None
Geylang International	(Japan) Yuki Ichikawa	(Japan) Kento Fukuda	(Germany) Thorsten Schneider	(Argentina) Franco Chiviló	(Argentina) Leonel Felice	(Argentina) Joaquin Lopez	None
Home United	(South Korea) Kwon Da-kyung	(South Korea) Song In-young	(South Korea) **Lee Kwan-woo**	(France) Sirina Camara	(Brazil) (Japan) Bruno Castanheira	(South Korea) Song Ui-young	
Hougang United	(Japan) Shunsuke Nakatake	(Brazil) Igor Ferreira Alves	(Brazil) Diego Gama	(Brazil) Geison Moura	(Croatia) Igor Čerina	(Indonesia) Sutanto Tan	(Croatia) Đurica Župarić
Tampines Rovers	(Japan) Kunihiro Yamashita	(New Zealand) Jake Butler	(Slovakia) Jozef Kapláň	(Australia) Justin Pasfield	(Serbia) **Miljan Mrdaković**	(Australia) Joseph Taylor	(Japan) Norihiro Kawakami (Paraguay) Luis Closa (Paraguay) Roberto Martínez Gamarra
Tanjong Pagar	(France) (Algeria) Kamel Ramdani	(France) Sébastien Etiemblé	(France) Anthony Aymard	(France) Aurélien Hérisson	(Morocco) **Monsef Zerka**	(Germany) Lucas Jester	None
Warriors FC	(Argentina) Nicolás Vélez	(England) Thomas Beattie	(Croatia) Miroslav Pejić	(Croatia) Marin Vidosevic	(Scotland) Kevin McCann	(Thailand) Chareewat Thirawatsirikul	(Sweden) Rasmus Fristedt
Woodlands	(South Korea) Moon Soon-Ho	(Japan) Atsushi Shimono	(South Korea) Jang Jo-yoon	(Serbia) Miloš Jevtić	(Serbia) Stefan Milojević	None	None
(Singapore) Young Lions	(Canada) Sherif El-Masri	(Canada) Jordan Webb	None	None	None	None	None

- Albirex Niigata (S) and Harimau Muda B are an all-Japanese and all-Malaysian team respectively and do not hire any foreigners.
- Players in **bold** are marquee player signings who command wages outside the monthly salary cap.

== League table ==
Pos	Team	Pld	W	D	L	GF	GA	GD	Pts	Qualification
1	Warriors FC	27	16	5	6	53	35	+18	53	Qualification to AFC Champions League Qualifying Round 1 or AFC Cup Group Stage
2	(Brunei) DPMM FC (Note: The three foreign clubs – Albirex Niigata (S), DPMM FC and Harimau Muda B – as well as the Football Association of Singapore (FAS) under-23 team, Young Lions, are not eligible for any AFC competition spots.)	27	15	5	7	63	30	+33	50	
3	Tampines Rovers	27	14	7	6	44	32	+12	49	
4	Home United	27	13	5	9	52	41	+11	44	
5	(Japan) Albirex Niigata (S)	27	13	5	9	51	40	+11	44	
6	Balestier Khalsa	27	11	7	9	46	34	+12	40	Qualification to AFC Cup Group Stage (Note: Qualified as 2014 Singapore Cup winners.)
7	Hougang United	27	12	6	9	49	42	+7	42	
8	Geylang International	27	8	8	11	33	44	−11	32	
9	Tanjong Pagar United	27	8	5	14	35	44	−9	29	
10	(Singapore) Young Lions	27	7	5	15	38	54	−16	26	
11	Woodlands Wellington	27	5	8	14	22	52	−30	23	
12	(Malaysia) Harimau Muda B	27	6	2	19	28	67	−39	20	

Source: RSSSF
Rules for classification: 1) points; 2) goal difference; 3) number of goals scored

== Results ==
=== Matchweek 1–22 ===
Home \ Away	ALB	BAL	DPM	GLI	HMB	HOM	HOU	TAM	TPU	WAR	WLW	YLI
Albirex Niigata (S)		1–0	0–1	4–2	3–0	4–2	0–1	2–2	2–1	0–4	7–1	4–2
Balestier Khalsa	1–1		3–3	1–1	2–0	3–0	4–1	0–2	1–0	2–2	1–2	3–1
DPMM FC	2–1	4–1		0–0	5–0	2–3	2–2	1–2	4–0	2–0	8–1	6–1
Geylang International	3–4	1–2	1–1		2–3	1–4	3–2	1–0	1–1	0–1	1–1	1–0
Harimau Muda B	1–4	1–5	1–4	0–3		0–3	3–4	0–1	1–2	2–4	1–0	2–3
Home United	4–2	2–1	0–3	4–1	3–1		2–2	2–2	4–0	2–2	0–0	0–3
Hougang United	3–1	2–1	0–1	2–0	1–2	3–1		4–2	1–1	3–2	2–2	0–3
Tampines Rovers	1–1	3–1	2–1	3–0	3–2	1–0	1–1		0–1	3–3	1–2	3–2
Tanjong Pagar United	1–2	0–3	1–2	1–2	1–2	1–2	1–2	1–1		1–1	0–1	3–0
Warriors FC	1–3	1–1	1–0	2–1	3–0	1–4	2–0	2–0	4–1		1–0	4–1
Woodlands Wellington	1–1	1–1	0–2	0–2	1–1	0–3	1–1	0–2	0–2	1–0		1–3
Young Lions	1–2	0–4	2–3	0–0	0–0	1–1	2–1	1–2	2–3	2–3	2–2	

Updated to match(es) played on 5 September 2014. Source: S.League
Legend: Blue = home team win; Yellow = draw; Red = away team win.

=== Matchday 23 - 27 ===
Top 6
Home \ Away	ALB	BAL	DPM	HOM	TAM	WAR
Albirex Niigata (S)			0–1	2–1		
Balestier Khalsa	2–0			0–1		
DPMM FC		1–1		1–2		2–3
Home United					0–1	2–3
Tampines Rovers	0–0	3–1	2–1			
Warriors FC	1–0	0–1			2–1	

Updated to match(es) played on 31 October 2014. Source: S.League
Legend: Blue = home team win; Yellow = draw; Red = away team win.

Bottom 6
Home \ Away	GLI	HMB	HOU	TPU	WLW	YLI
Geylang International			0–4	1–1	2–1	
Harimau Muda B	1–2			0–5		
Hougang United		0–1		4–2		
Tanjong Pagar United					1–0	3–1
Woodlands Wellington		3–2	0–3			1–2
Young Lions	1–1	0–1	2–0			

Updated to match(es) played on 30 October 2014. Source: S.League
Legend: Blue = home team win; Yellow = draw; Red = away team win.

== Season statistics ==
=== Goalscorers ===
As of 24 November 2014

Rank	Player	Club	Goals
1	(Brazil) Rodrigo Tosi	(Brunei) DPMM FC	24
2	(Japan) Kazuki Sakamoto	(Japan) Albirex Niigata (S)	21
2	(Brazil) Geison Moura	Hougang United	21
2	(Argentina) Nicolás Vélez	Warriors FC	21
5	(Croatia) Goran Ljubojević	Balestier Khalsa	20
6	(Republic of Ireland) Roy O'Donovan	(Brunei) DPMM FC	15
7	(Argentina) Leonel Felice	Geylang International	13
8	(Bosnia and Herzegovina) Miroslav Pejić	Warriors FC	12
9	(Serbia) Miljan Mrdaković	Tampines Rovers	11
10	Sahil Suhaimi	(Singapore) Young Lions	10
10	Fazrul Nawaz	Home United	10
10	(Brazil) Diego Gama	Hougang United	10

=== Hat-tricks ===
As of matches played 27 August 2014

Player	For	Against	Result	Date
(France) Monsef Zerka	Tanjong Pagar United	(Singapore) Young Lions	3–2	26 March 2014
(Argentina) Nicolás Vélez^{4}	Warriors FC	(Japan) Albirex Niigata (S)	4–0	16 April 2014
(Japan) Kazuki Sakamoto	(Japan) Albirex Niigata (S)	(Malaysia) Harimau Muda B	4–1	23 May 2014
(Japan) Kazuki Sakamoto	(Japan) Albirex Niigata (S)	Woodlands Wellington	7–1	11 June 2014
(Argentina) Nicolás Vélez	Warriors FC	(Singapore) Young Lions	4–1	14 August 2014

^{4} Player scored 4 goals

=== Clean sheets ===
==== Player ====
As of matches played 24 June 2014

Rank	Player	Club	Clean sheets
1	(Brunei) Wardun Yusof	(Brunei) DPMM FC	7
2	Hassan Sunny	Warriors FC	5
2	Zaiful Nizam	Balestier Khalsa	5
4	Shahril Jantan	Home United	4
5	Siddiq Durimi	Geylang International	3
6	Ahmadulhaq Che Omar	Woodlands Wellington	2
6	(France) Aurélien Hérisson	Tanjong Pagar United	2
6	Hyrulnizam Juma'at	Tampines Rovers	2
6	Joey Sim	Geylang International	2
6	(Australia) Justin Pasfield	Tampines Rovers	2
11	(Brunei) Azman Ilham	(Brunei) DPMM FC	1
11	Fadhil Salim	Hougang United	1
11	(Malaysia) Ilham Amirullah	(Malaysia) Harimau Muda B	1
11	(Japan) Kazuki Kishigami	(Japan) Albirex Niigata (S)	1
11	(Japan) Kenjiro Ogino	(Japan) Albirex Niigata (S)	1
11	Neezam Aziz	Warriors FC	1
11	Rudy Khairullah	(Singapore) Young Lions	1
11	Syazwan Buhari	Young Lions	1
11	Yazid Yasin	Woodlands Wellington	1

==== Club ====
As of matches played 24 June 2014

Rank	Club	Clean sheets	Longest run
1	(Brunei) DPMM FC	8	3
2	Warriors FC	6	2
3	Geylang International	5	3
3	Balestier Khalsa	5	1
5	Home United	4	2
5	Tampines Rovers	4	1
7	(Japan) Albirex Niigata (S)	2	1
7	(Singapore) Young Lions	2	1
7	Tanjong Pagar United	2	1
7	Woodlands Wellington	2	1
10	(Malaysia) Harimau Muda B	1	1
10	Hougang United	1	1

== S-League Awards Night Winners ==
Awards	Winners	Club
Player of the Year	Hassan Sunny	Warriors FC
Young Player of the Year	(Argentina) Nicolás Vélez	Warriors FC
Coach of the Year	(Croatia) Marko Kraljević	Balestier Khalsa
Top Scorer Award	(Brazil) Rodrigo Tosi	(Brunei) DPMM FC
Fair Play Award	Geylang International	
Referee of the Year	Muhammad Taqi Aljaafari Bin Jahari	
