= Min-ho =

- Hangul: 민호
- RR: Minho
- MR: Minho

Min-ho is a Korean given name. Min-ho was the ninth-most popular name for South Korean baby boys in 1980.

== Entertainers ==
- Woo Min-ho (born 1971), South Korean film director and screenwriter
- Jang Min-ho (born 1977), South Korean singer
- Boom (entertainer), stage name of Lee Min-ho (born 1982), South Korean rapper and television/radio personality
- Lee Min-ho (born 1987), South Korean actor
- Choi Min-ho (born 1991), South Korean singer, member of boy band Shinee
- Lee Tae-ri (born Lee Min-ho, 1993), South Korean actor
- Mino (rapper), stage name of Song Min-ho (born 1993), South Korean rapper, member of boy band Winner
- Lee Know, stage name of Lee Min-ho (born 1998), South Korean singer, member of boy band Stray Kids

== Sports ==
- Choi Min-ho (badminton) (born 1980), South Korean badminton player
- Choi Min-ho (judoka) (born 1980), South Korean judoka
- Kang Min-ho (born 1985), South Korean baseball catcher
- Kim Min-ho (footballer, born 1985), South Korean football midfielder (K League 1)
- Cheon Min-ho (born 1987), South Korean sport shooter
- Cho Min-ho (born 1987), South Korean ice hockey player
- Choi Min-ho (volleyball) (born 1988), South Korean volleyball player
- Heo Min-ho (born 1990), South Korean triathlete
- Kim Min-ho (footballer, born 1991), South Korean football forward (Singapore S.League)
- Lee Min-ho (baseball) (born 1993), South Korean baseball pitcher
- Kim Min-ho (footballer, born 1997) (born 1997), South Korean football defender (K League 1)

== Fictional ==
- Cha Min-ho, main antagonist of 2017 TV series Innocent Defendant, portrayed by Um Ki-joon.
- Kang Min-ho, main antagonist of 2011 TV series 49 Days, portrayed by Bae Soo-bin.
- Minho, one of the main characters of James Dashner's movie and novel series The Maze Runner, portrayed by Ki Hong Lee.
- Minho Moon, one of the main characters of the 2023 Netflix television series XO, Kitty, portrayed by Sang Heon Lee.

== See also ==
- List of Korean given names
