= Jeftić =

Jeftić (Serbian: Јефтић) is a surname. Notable people with the surname include:

- Danina Jeftić (born 1986), Serbian actress and handball player
- Dejan Jeftić (born 1989), Bosnian professional basketball player

== See also ==
- Jevtić
