= Kim Min-ho =

Kim Min-ho (김민호) may refer to:

- Kim Min-ho (footballer, born 1985), South Korean former footballer
- Kim Min-ho (footballer, born 1990), South Korean former footballer; spent 4 years with Incheon National University's team
- Kim Min-ho (footballer, born 1991), South Korean former footballer
- Kim Min-ho (footballer, born 1997), South Korean footballer, currently playing for Ansan Greeners
- Kim Min-ho (footballer, born 2000), South Korean footballer, currently playing for Nagano Parceiro
- Kim Min-ho (baseball) (born 1969), South Korean baseball player, winner of the 1995 Korean Series Most Valuable Player Award
- Kim Min-ho (actor) (born 1990), South Korean actor, nominated for various awards for his role in Swing Kids
