= Big Twin =

Big Twin may refer to:

- a two-patty hamburger with a unique sauce, was originally one of Hardee's signature menu items
  - Big Twin Sauce, a condiment used on hamburgers at Hardee's
- Big Twin Lake, a lake in Martin County, Minnesota
- a motorcycle from an American manufacturer with the larger of two V-twin engines made by the manufacturer
  - Harley-Davidson motorcycle with an engine capacity of 74 cu. in or greater (not including the 1200 cc Sportster from the early 1980s onward)
  - Indian Chief motorcycle
- Big Twin (video game), a Japanese adult arcade game from 1995
