= 2014 Singapore League Cup =

Tournament details
- Country: Singapore
- Dates: 7–25 July
- Teams: 12

Final positions
- Champions: (Brunei) DPMM FC
- Runners-up: Tanjong Pagar United

Tournament statistics
- Matches played: 22
- Goals scored: 38 (1.73 per match)
- Top goal scorer: Miljan Mrdaković (6 goals)

Awards
- Best player: Miljan Mrdaković

The 2014 Singapore League Cup was the eighth season of Singapore's premier club football tournament organised by Football Association of Singapore, and also known as the 2014 StarHub League Cup for sponsorship reasons.

For the second year in succession, National Football League clubs will participate in the tournament. Unlike the previous season where NFL sides had to compete in play-offs to earn the right to represent the league against the professionals, the representatives in this edition qualified through the league positions from last season.

The 2014 Singapore League Cup plate final was played between Tampines Rovers and Balestier Khalsa at the Jalan Besar Stadium in Kallang, Singapore. Miljan Mrdaković, who scored a hat-trick in the semi-finals against Police Sports Association, reproduced another hat-trick to clinch the plate for Tampines. He becomes the first player in history to score two hat-tricks in the tournament, and consecutively.

The 2014 Singapore League Cup final was played between Tanjong Pagar United and Brunei DPMM at the Jalan Besar Stadium in Kallang, Singapore. Brunei DPMM eliminated Tanjong Pagar United by a score of 2–0 to lift the League Cup trophy.

== Teams ==
The top ten clubs from 2013 S.League were divided into three pots based on their final league positions. Developmental sides Harimau Muda and Young Lions have opted out of participation in this year's edition as they will be on a training tour in Austria. League positions of the previous season are shown in parentheses.

Pot A	Pot B	Pot C
Tampines Rovers (1st)	Woodlands Wellington (5th)	Geylang International (9th)
Home United (2nd)	Tanjong Pagar United (6th)	Hougang United (10th)
(Japan) Albirex Niigata (S) (3rd)	Warriors FC (7th)	Police Sports Association* (1st)
Balestier Khalsa (4th)	(Brunei) DPMM FC (8th)	Singapore Recreation Club* (2nd)

- Police SA and Singapore Recreation Club are clubs from the NFL. They finished champions and runners-up respectively in the first division.

== Round and draw dates ==
The schedule of the competition was as follows. The draw took place on 20 June at the Jalan Besar Stadium, during which the teams were drawn by various club representatives.

Phase	Round	Draw date	Match date
Preliminary phase	First preliminary round	20 June 2014	7–8 July 2014
Preliminary phase	Second preliminary round	20 June 2014	10–12 July 2014
Preliminary phase	Third qualifying round	20 June 2014	13–15 July 2014
Knockout phase	Quarter-finals	20 June 2014	17–18 July 2014
Knockout phase	Semi-finals	20 June 2014	21 July 2014
Knockout phase	Final	20 June 2014	25 July 2014 at Jalan Besar Stadium, Singapore
Plate knockout phase	Semi-finals	20 June 2014	19 July 2014
Plate knockout phase	Final	20 June 2014	24 July 2014 at Jalan Besar Stadium, Singapore

== Format ==
The preliminary phase was a competition between the 12 teams divided among four groups of three, where each group engaged in a round-robin tournament within itself. The two highest ranked teams in each group advanced to the knockout phase. The third-placed team in each group entered the plate knockout phase. Teams were awarded 3 points for a win and one for a draw.

Tie-breaking criteria for group play

The ranking of teams in each group was based on the following criteria:

1. Number of points
2. Goal difference
3. Number of goals scored
4. Head-to-head record between tied teams
5. Drawing of lots

The knockout phase involved the eight teams that qualified from the preliminary phase of the tournament, while the plate knockout phase involved the four teams that finished third in the preliminary phase of the tournament. For the knockout phase, there were three rounds of matches, with each round eliminating half of the teams entering that round, whereas for the plate knockout phase, there were two rounds of matches, with each round eliminating half of the teams entering that round. For each game in the knockout phase, a draw was followed by thirty minutes of extra time (except the final); if scores were still level there would be a penalty shoot-out to determine who progressed to the next round.

== Preliminary phase ==
The preliminary phase began on 7 July and will conclude on 15 July. There were some changes to the fixtures released.

Changes to fixtures

- Group B: Tampines Rovers v Warriors was postponed from 10 July to 12 July due to technical faults.
- Group C: Home United v Singapore Recreation Club has been postponed from 11 July to 14 July.
- Group C: Woodlands Wellington v Singapore Recreation Club was brought forward from 14 July, 8pm to 11 July, 8.15pm.

Key to colours in group tables
Group winners and runners-up advanced to the quarter-finals
Third-placed teams entered the plate semi-finals

All times listed below are in Singaporean official time (UTC+8).

=== Group A ===
Team	Pld	W	D	L	GF	GA	GD	Pts	TPU	ALB	PSA
Tanjong Pagar United	2	2	0	0	11	1	+10	6		4–0	7–1
(Japan) Albirex Niigata (S)	2	1	0	1	13	4	+9	3			13–0
Police Sports Association	2	0	0	2	1	20	−19	0			

7 July 2014
20:00

Tanjong Pagar United	4–0	(Japan) Albirex Niigata (S)
Latiff 10'; Etiemble 45' (pen.), 72'; Zerka 68'	Report

Queenstown Stadium
Referee: Muhd Taqi (SIN)

10 July 2014
20:00

Albirex Niigata (S) (Japan)	13–0	Police SA
Okazaki 4', 50', 54'; Kawakami 22', 45'; Fukuzaki 24'; Sakamoto 26', 65', 90'; Yamada 40', 73'; Ota 87'; Nishio 89'	Report

Jurong East Stadium
Referee: Farhad Mohd (SIN)

13 July 2014
20:00

Tanjong Pagar United	7–1	Police SA
Latiff 10', 42'; Rashid 20'; Firdaus 25', 45', 52'; Zerka 38'	Report	Razali 69'

Queenstown Stadium
Referee: Ahmad A'Qashah (SIN)

=== Group B ===
Team	Pld	W	D	L	GF	GA	GD	Pts	GLI	WAR	TAM
Geylang International	2	2	0	0	6	1	+5	6			2–1
Warriors FC	2	1	0	1	3	6	−3	3	0–4		
Tampines Rovers	2	0	0	2	3	5	−2	0		2–3	

7 July 2014
20:00

Geylang International	2–1	Tampines Rovers
Mustaqim 71'; Felice 76'	Report	Kapláň 9'

Jalan Besar Stadium
Referee: Ahmad A'Qashah (SIN)

12 July 2014
20:00

Tampines Rovers	2–3	Warriors FC
Butler 8'; Fahrudin 23'	Report	Agu 12', 46', 51'

Clementi Stadium
Referee: Farhad Mohd (SIN)

15 July 2014
20:00

Warriors FC	0–4	Geylang International
	Report	Schneider 49'; Fuad 86'; Hafiz 90'; Neezam 86' (o.g.)

Choa Chu Kang Stadium
Referee: Jansen Foo (SIN)

=== Group C ===
Team	Pld	W	D	L	GF	GA	GD	Pts	HOM	WLW	SRC
Home United	2	2	0	0	8	1	+7	6			2–0
Woodlands Wellington	2	1	0	1	2	6	−4	3	1–6		1–0
Singapore Recreation Club	2	0	0	2	0	3	−3	0			

Updated to games played on 11 July 2014.

8 July 2014
20:00

Woodlands Wellington	1–6	Home United
Chang 6'	Report	Lee 34'; Qiu Li 46'; Kwon 54'; Hanapi 70'; Castanheira 72'; Indra 85'

Woodlands Stadium
Referee: Jansen Foo (SIN)

11 July 2014
20:15

Woodlands Wellington	1–0	Singapore Recreation Club
Mamadou 29'	Report

Woodlands Stadium
Referee: Muhd Taqi (SIN)

14 July 2014
20:00

Home United	2–0	Singapore Recreation Club
Camara 42' (pen.); Fazli 43'	Report

Bishan Stadium
Referee: W. Ravisanthiran (SIN)

=== Group D ===
Team	Pld	W	D	L	GF	GA	GD	Pts	DPMM	HOU	BAL
(Brunei) DPMM FC	2	1	1	0	5	4	+1	4			2–2
Hougang United	2	1	0	1	5	3	+2	3	2–3		
Balestier Khalsa	2	0	1	1	2	5	−3	1		0–3	

8 July 2014
20:00

Balestier Khalsa	0–3	Hougang United
	Report	Geison 34'; Faiz 88'; Diego 90'

Hougang Stadium
Referee: W. Ravisanthiran (SIN)

11 July 2014
20:00

DPMM FC (Brunei)	2–2	Balestier Khalsa
Tosi 57'; O'Donovan 78'	Report	Ljubojević 69', 83'

Jalan Besar Stadium
Referee: Jansen Foo (SIN)

14 July 2014
20:00

Hougang United	2–3	(Brunei) DPMM FC
Aziz 29' (o.g.); Gamble 84' (o.g.)	Report	O'Donovan 56', 77', 80' (pen.)

Hougang Stadium
Referee: Sukhbir Singh (SIN)

== Knockout phase ==
The knockout phase involved the eight teams that qualified from the preliminary phase of the tournament. There are three rounds of matches, with each round eliminating half of the teams entering that round. The successive rounds were: quarter-finals, semi-finals, and final. For each game in the knockout phase, a draw was followed by thirty minutes of extra time (except the final); if scores were still level there would be a penalty shoot-out to determine who progressed to the next round.

Quarter-finals
Tanjong Pagar United	1
Warriors FC	0
Home United	1
Hougang United	2
Geylang International	3
(Japan) Albirex Niigata (S)	1
(Brunei) DPMM FC	3
Woodlands Wellington	1

Semi-finals
Tanjong Pagar United	0
Hougang United	0
Geylang International	0
(Brunei) DPMM FC	0

Final
Tanjong Pagar United	0
(Brunei) DPMM FC	2

=== Quarter-finals ===
Team 1	Score	Team 2
Home United	1–2	Hougang United
DPMM FC (Brunei)	3–1	Woodlands Wellington
Tanjong Pagar United	1–0	Warriors FC
Geylang International	3–1	(Japan) Albirex Niigata (S)

17 July 2014
20:00

Home United	1–2	Hougang United
Lee 17'	Report	Geison 83' (pen.); Nurhilmi 86'

Bishan Stadium
Referee: Ahmad A'Qashah (SIN)

17 July 2014
20:00

DPMM FC (Brunei)	3–1	Woodlands
Tosi 80', 86'; Adi 90'	Report	Chang 56'

Jalan Besar Stadium
Referee: Farhad Mohd (SIN)

18 July 2014
20:00

Tanjong Pagar United	1–0 (a.e.t.)	Warriors FC
Firdaus 116'	Report

Queenstown Stadium
Referee: Sukhbir Singh (SIN)

18 July 2014
20:00

Geylang International	3–1	(Japan) Albirex Niigata (S)
Kento 20'; Felice 54'; Hafiz 90+2'	Report	Kawakami 70'

Jalan Besar Stadium
Referee: W. Ravisanthiran (SIN)

=== Semi-finals ===
Team 1	Score	Team 2
Tanjong Pagar United	0–0	Hougang United
Geylang International	0–0	(Brunei) DPMM FC

=== Final ===
Team 1	Score	Team 2
Tanjong Pagar United	0–2	(Brunei) DPMM FC

25 July 2014
20:00

Tanjong Pagar United	0–2	(Brunei) DPMM FC
	Report	Raspudić 35'; Adi 47'

Jalan Besar Stadium
Attendance: 2,038
Referee: Farhad Mohd (SIN)

== Plate knockout phase ==
The plate knockout phase involved the four teams that finished third in the preliminary phase of the tournament. There are two rounds of matches, with each round eliminating half of the teams entering that round. The successive rounds were: semi-finals and final. For each game in the plate knockout phase, a draw was followed by thirty minutes of extra time (except the final); if scores were still level there would be a penalty shoot-out to determine who progressed to the next round.

Semi-finals
Tampines Rovers	9
Police SA	0
Balestier Khalsa	2
Singapore RC	0

Final
Tampines Rovers	3
Balestier Khalsa	0

=== Plate semi-finals ===
Team 1	Score	Team 2
Tampines Rovers	9–0	Police Sports Association
Balestier Khalsa	2–0	Singapore Recreation Club

19 July 2014
20:00

Tampines Rovers	9–0	Police SA
Kapláň 15'; Ang 45'; Mrdaković 47', 70' (pen.), 74'; Alam Shah 64', 87' van Huizen 76'; Butler 88'	Report

Clementi Stadium
Referee: Muhd Taqi (SIN)

19 July 2014
20:00

Balestier Khalsa	2–0	Singapore Recreation Club
Ljubojević 17', 23'	Report

Toa Payoh Stadium
Referee: Jansen Foo (SIN)

=== Plate final ===
Team 1	Score	Team 2
Tampines Rovers	3–0	Balestier Khalsa

24 July 2014
20:00

Tampines Rovers	3–0	Balestier Khalsa
Mrdaković 27', 82', 84'	Report

Jalan Besar Stadium
Referee: Farhad Mohd (SIN)

== Statistics ==
=== Goalscorers ===
6 goals

- (Serbia) Miljan Mrdaković (TAM)

4 goals

- (Croatia) Goran Ljubojević (BAL)
- (Republic of Ireland) Roy O'Donovan (DPMM)
- (Singapore) Firdaus Idros (TPU)

3 goals

- (Japan) Kazuki Sakamoto (ALB)
- (Japan) Kazuya Okazaki (ALB)
- (Japan) Norihiro Kawakami (ALB)
- (Brazil) Rodrigo Tosi (DPMM)
- (Singapore) Ahmad Latiff (TPU)
- (Singapore) Agu Casmir (WAR)

2 goals

- (Japan) Itsuki Yamada (ALB)
- (Brunei) Adi Said (DPMM)
- (Singapore) Hafiz Nor (GLI)
- (Argentina) Leonel Felice (GLI)
- (South Korea) Lee Kwan-woo (HOM)
- (Brazil) Geison Moura (HOU)
- (New Zealand) Jake Butler (TAM)
- (Slovenia) Jozef Kapláň (TAM)
- (Singapore) Noh Alam Shah (TAM)
- (France) Monsef Zerka (TPU)
- (France) Sébastien Etiemble (TPU)
- (South Korea) Chang Jo-yoon (WLW)

1 goal

- (Japan) Kaoru Nishio (ALB)
- (Japan) Kazuya Fukuzaki (ALB)
- (Japan) Keisuke Ota (ALB)
- (Brunei) Boris Raspudić (DPMM)
- (Singapore) Fuad Ramli (GLI)
- (Japan) Kento Fukuda (GLI)
- (Singapore) Mustaqim Manzur (GLI)
- (Germany) Thorsten Schneider (GLI)
- (Brazil) Bruno Castanheira (HOM)
- (Singapore) Fazli Ayob (HOM)
- (Singapore) Indra Sahdan Daud (HOM)
- (South Korea) Kwon Da-kyung (HOM)
- (France) Sirina Camara (HOM)
- (Singapore) Qiu Li (HOM)
- (Singapore) Yasir Hanapi (HOM)
- (Brazil) Diego Olivera (HOU)
- (Singapore) Faiz Salleh (HOU)
- (Singapore) Nurhilmi Jasni (HOU)
- (Singapore) Daniel Razali (PSA)
- (Singapore) Ang Zhiwei (TAM)
- (Singapore) Chris van Huizen (TAM)
- (Singapore) Mustafić Fahrudin (TAM)
- (Singapore) Asraf Rashid (TPU)
- (Singapore) Bah Mamadou (WLW)

Own goals

- (Brunei) Abdul Aziz (DPMM) for ALB
- (Republic of Ireland) Joe Gamble (DPMM) for ALB
- (Singapore) Neezam Aziz (WAR) for GLI

=== Hat-tricks ===
Player	For	Against	Result	Date
(Japan) Kazuya Okazaki	(Japan) Albirex Niigata (S)	Police Sports Association	13–0	10 July 2014
(Japan) Kazuki Sakamoto	(Japan) Albirex Niigata (S)	Police Sports Association	13–0	10 July 2014
(Singapore) Agu Casmir	Warriors FC	Tampines Rovers	3–2	12 July 2014
(Singapore) Firdaus Idros	Tanjong Pagar United	Police Sports Association	7–1	13 July 2014
(Republic of Ireland) Roy O'Donovan	(Brunei) DPMM FC	Hougang United	3–2	14 July 2014
(Serbia) Miljan Mrdaković	Tampines Rovers	Police Sports Association	9–0	19 July 2014
(Serbia) Miljan Mrdaković	Tampines Rovers	Balestier Khalsa	3–0	24 July 2014

== See also ==
- S.League
- Singapore FA Cup
- Singapore Cup
- Singapore Charity Shield
- Football Association of Singapore
- List of football clubs in Singapore
