= Alviž =

Alviž is a surname. Notable people with the surname include:

- Lujo Alviž Matutinović (1765–1844), Venetian, Austrian and French military officer
- Robert Alviž (born 1984), Croatian footballer
