= In-young =

- Hangul: 인영
- RR: Inyeong
- MR: Inyŏng

In-young is a Korean given name.

People with this name include:

- Choi In-young (born 1962), South Korean football player
- Hwang In-young (born 1978), South Korean actress
- Park Inyoung (born 1982), South Korean singer
- Seo In-young (born 1984), South Korean singer
- Yoo In-young (born Yoo Hyo-min, 1984), South Korean actress
- Hong In-young (born 1985), South Korean actress
- Song In-young (born 1990), South Korean football player

== See also ==
- List of Korean given names
