= Jevtić =

Jevtić (Serbian: Јевтић) is a Serbian surname. It is a patronymic derived from the name Euthymius (Serbian: Jevtimije / Јевтимије). Notable people with the surname include:

- Ana Mirjana Račanović-Jevtić (born c. 1980), Bosnian singer, model and beauty pageant titleholder
- Aleksandar Jevtić (born 1985), Serbian footballer
- Bogoljub Jevtić (1886–1960), Serbian diplomat and politician in the Kingdom of Yugoslavia
- Darko Jevtić (born 1993), Swiss footballer
- Dušan Jevtić (born 1992), Bosnian footballer
- Goran Jevtić (actor) (born 1978), Serbian actor
- Goran Jevtić (footballer), (born 1970), Serbian footballer
- Ivan Jevtić (born 1947) Serbian-French composer
- Miloš Jevtić (born 1989), Serbian footballer
- Miroljub Jevtić (born 1955), Serbian historian
- Nikon Jevtić (born 1993), Serbian-English footballer
- Olivera Jevtić (born 1977) Serbian long-distance runner
- Živorad Jevtić (1943–2000), Serbian footballer
