= Alando Atkinson =

English footballer

Personal information
- Full name: Alando Nicholas Atkinson
- Place of birth: England
- Position: Midfielder

Youth career
- Kuala Lumpur Youth Soccer
- EduKick Madrid
- AD Colmenar Viejo

Senior career*
Years	Team	Apps	(Gls)
2014	Balestier Khalsa FC	3	(0)
- * Club domestic league appearances and goals

Alando Nicholas Atkinson is an English former professional football midfielder.

== Career ==
In his youth, he was part of the Kuala Lumpur youth soccer program, and went abroad to start his career at the EduKick Madrid soccer academy at age 15.

ATM eventually annulled his contract as M-League rules state that a foreign import has to have played in a country's second tier. One year later, Balestier Khalsa offered him a one-week trial. He impressed the club management, and they signed him for a half-year deal in 2014. Ultimately, he was handed his first-team debut in a 2-2 cup tie away at DPMM.

Ever since his football contract ended in 2014, he is working as an instructor for the workout institution Flycycle and did advertising work for watch manufacturer TAG Heuer in March 2017.

== Statistics ==
Year	Club	League Apps	Cup Apps	Goals
2017	Tampines Rovers FC	3	2	0
