= NK Lipik =

Croatian football club

NK Lipik 1925
- Full name: Nogometni klub Lipik
- Founded: 1925
- Ground: Stadion NK Lipik
- Capacity: 1,000
- Manager: Ognjen Kafka
- League: 1.ŽNL Požeško-slavonske županije
Home colours

NK Lipik is a Croatian football club based in the town of Lipik. Biggest success is 1/16 phase of Croatian National Cup, when they were defeated by Hajduk Split.

== Honours ==
- Treća HNL – East:
  - Winners (1): 2009–10
- Četvrta HNL – East:
  - Winners (1): 2008–09
- First League of Požega-Slavonia County:
  - Winners (1): 2007–08
