= Robert Alviž =

Croatian footballer

Personal information
- Date of birth: 6 September 1984 (age 42)
- Place of birth: Primošten, SFR Yugoslavia
- Height: 1.81 m (5 ft 11 in)
- Position: Midfielder

Youth career
- 2004: TuS Arnfels
- 2004: SV Frauental

Senior career*
Years	Team	Apps	(Gls)
2005–2006	Hollenegg	26	(8)
2006–2008	Međimurje	15	(0)
2008–2010	Flamurtari Vlorë	33	(4)
2010	Liezen	14	(3)
2010–2011	Kastrioti	29	(4)
2011–2012	Anagennisi Dherynia	15	(3)
2012–2013	Khazar Lankaran	38	(5)
2013	Atyrau	10	(3)
2014	DPMM	26	(4)
2015	Tampines Rovers	20	(1)
2016–2017	Šibenik	9	(0)
2018–2019	Oberdorf	8	(0)
2019–2022	Lipik	27	(9)
- * Club domestic league appearances and goals

Roberto Alviž (born 6 September 1984) is a Croatian former football player who played as a midfielder.

== Club career ==
Alviž previously played for Khazar Lankaran in Azerbaijan Premier League and Anagennisi Dherynia in Cyprus First Division. In the season 2008/2009 Flamurtari finished sixth in Albanian Superliga and won the Albanian Cup. Roberto Alviž played an important role for Flamurtari in this season, so Flamurtari offered him another 1-year contract, which he signed in the first days of June 2009. Alviž left Flamurtari before Christmas 2009 and signed a contract for amateur club SC KNAUF Liezen in the Austrian Landesliga.

In the winter transfer window of the 2011–12 season, Alviž joined Azerbaijan Premier League side Khazar Lankaran.

In July 2013 Alviž signed for FC Atyrau in Kazakhstan. His debut came on 7 July 2013 in a 1–0 away defeat to Irtysh Pavlodar.

On 25 November 2013, Alviž went on a two-week trial with S.League side Brunei DPMM. Following the completion of the trial Brunei DPMM announced they would be signing Alviž along with Joe Gamble and Boris Raspudić.

In January 2015, Alviž signed with Bhayangkara F.C.. However, he was released after just 3 weeks with the team.

Following his release, he signed for Tampines Rovers on a six-months contract in February 2015 as an injury replacement for Srecko Mitrovic. Upon his signing, Tampines Head Coach, V Sundramoorthy expressed his faith in Alviž, claiming that "Alviž is a good player, and between Mitrovic and him, there’s no difference. In fact, Alviz can be as good as or even better than Mitrovic. I believe we’ve got a good player here."

He joined Austrian fifth-tier club ASKÖ Oberdorf in February 2018, only to leave the country again in April 2019. He spent the tail end of his career with NK Lipik from 2019 to 2022.

== Career statistics ==
As of 28 April 2026

Club statistics
Season	Club	League	League		Cup		League Cup		Continental		Total	
Season	Club	League	App	Goals	App	Goals	App	Goals	App	Goals	App	Goals
2008–09	Flamurtari Vlorë	Albanian Superliga	18	2			-		-		18	2
2009–10	Flamurtari Vlorë	Albanian Superliga	15	2			-		2	0	17	2
2009–10	Liezen	Austrian Landesliga	14	3			-		-		14	3
2010–11	KS Kastrioti	Albanian Superliga	30	4			-		-		30	4
2011–12	Anagennisi Dherynia	Cypriot First Division	13	3			-		-		13	3
2011–12	Khazar Lankaran	Azerbaijan Premier League	13	0	2	0	-		0	0	15	0
2012–13	Khazar Lankaran	Azerbaijan Premier League	23	5	3	0	-		4	0	30	5
2013	Atyrau	Kazakhstan Premier League	10	3	0	0	-		-		10	3
2014	DPMM	S.League	26	4	5	1	5	0	-		36	5
2015	Bhayangkara	Indonesia Super League	0	0	0	0	0	0	-		0	0
2015	Tampines Rovers	S.League	20	1	1	0	1	0	-		22	1
2016–17	HNK Šibenik	Druga NL	9	0	0	0	-		-		9	0
2017–18	Oberdorf	2. Liga Süd	8	0	0	0	-		-		8	0
2018–19	NK Lipik	1. ŽNL	5	2	0	0	-		-		5	2
2019–20	NK Lipik	MŽNL PŽ-SB	5	0	1	0	-		-		6	0
2020–21	NK Lipik	MŽNL PŽ-SB	15	5	1	0	-		-		16	5
2021–22	NK Lipik	MŽNL PŽ-SB	7	2	2	0	-		-		9	2
Total			231	36	15	1	6	0	6	0	258	37

== Honours ==
- DPMM FC
  - Singapore League Cup (1): 2014
