= Big Twin Sauce =

Condiment used on hamburgers at Hardee's

Big Twin Sauce is a condiment featured by the Hardee's and Carl's Jr. restaurant chain. The sauce is comparable in taste to Thousand Island dressing. The sauce is featured in Hardee's Big Hardee sandwich and Carl's Jr. Big Carl. Although the exact composition of the sauce is a trade-secret, its likely ingredients include mayonnaise, eggs, pickles, green onions, salt and pepper and chili sauce. It is comparable to McDonald's own special sauce, first released in 1975.

Americans have a longstanding history of being drawn to the flavor combination of Thousand Island dressing on a double cheeseburger. Standard cheeseburger condiments include ketchup, barbecue sauce, mayonnaise, relish, mustard, and also Thousand Island dressing.

Many fast food restaurants feature a similar style sauce. This includes Wendy's, Sonic Drive-In, Burger King, and Arby's.
