= Dejan Jeftić =

Bosnia and Herzegovina basketball player

Free agent
- Position: Small forward

Personal information
- Born: March 13, 1989 (age 37) Tuzla, Bosnia and Herzegovina
- Listed height: 2.00 m (6 ft 7 in)
- Listed weight: 98 kg (216 lb)

Career information
- NBA draft: 2011: undrafted
- Playing career: 2006–present

Career history
- 2006–2007: Radnik Bijeljina
- 2007–2011: Sloboda Tuzla
- 2011: Södertälje Kings
- 2011–2012: Helios Domžale
- 2013: Vršac
- 2013–2014: Hacettepe Üniversitesi B.K.
- 2014–2015: Klosterneuburg Dukes
- 2015–2016: Zlatorog Laško
- 2016–2017: Norrköping Dolphins
- 2017–2018: Lions de Genève
- 2018–2019: Batumi
- 2019–2020: Slávia Žilina
- 2020: Bosna Royal
- 2021: Zlatibor

Dejan Jeftić (born March 13, 1989) is a Bosnian professional basketball player who most recently played for Zlatibor of the ABA League Second Division.

== Professional career ==
On 13 January 2021, Jeftić signed for a Serbian team Zlatibor.
