= Boris Raspudić =

Bosnian-Herzegovinian footballer (born 1982)

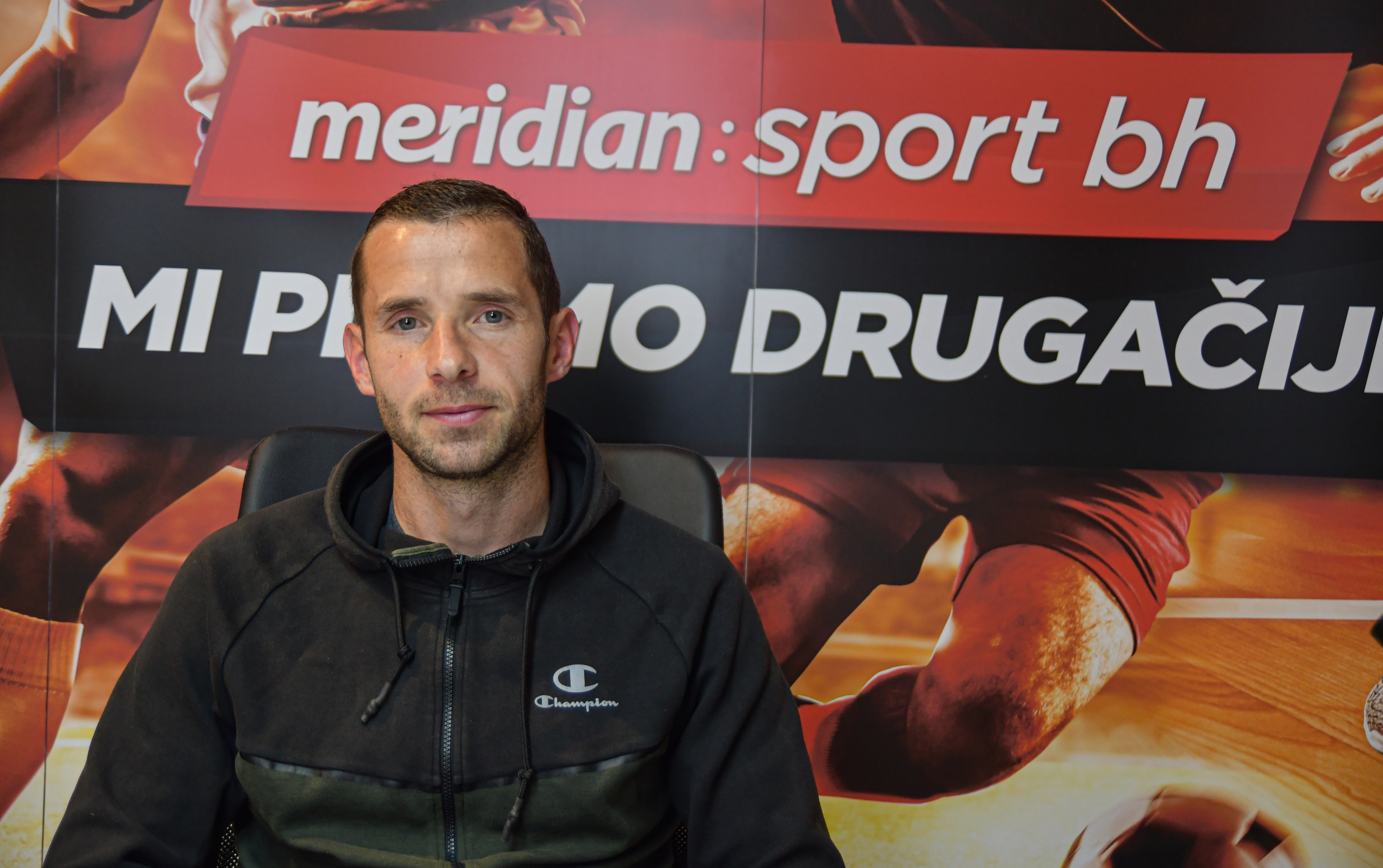

Personal information
- Full name: Boris Raspudić
- Date of birth: 11 October 1982 (age 44)
- Place of birth: Banja Luka, SFR Yugoslavia
- Height: 1.80 m (5 ft 11 in)
- Position: Defender

Youth career
- 2000–2002: Sloga Trn
- 2002–2003: BSK Banja Luka

Senior career*
Years	Team	Apps	(Gls)
2003–2007	Borac Banja Luka	78	(8)
2007–2010	Petrochimi Tabriz		
2010–2014	Borac Banja Luka	97	(3)
2014–2015	DPMM	51	(5)
2016–2017	Borac Banja Luka	39	(2)
2018–2021	Kozara Gradiška	77	(4)

International career
2010	Bosnia and Herzegovina	1	(0)

Managerial career
- 2021–2022: Sloga Trn
- 2022–: Borac Banja Luka (assistant)
- * Club domestic league appearances and goals

Boris Raspudić (Serbian Cyrillic: Борис Распудић; born 11 October 1982) is a Bosnian former footballer who played as a defender.

== Club career ==
Raspudic played for Borac Banja Luka in the Premijer Liga before transferring to Iranian third level club Petrochimi Tabriz alongside Bojan Tadić in 2007, where they were promoted to the Azadegan League through the playoffs. In summer 2010 he rejoined Borac Banja Luka and won the Bosnia Premier League that season. This enabled him to feature in the 2011–12 UEFA Champions League qualifying second stage where Borac Banja Luca were knocked out by Maccabi Haifa 4–7 on aggregate.

On 25 November 2013, Raspudić went on a two-week trial with S.League side Brunei DPMM. Following the completion of the trial Brunei DPMM announced they would be signing Raspudić along with Joe Gamble and Robert Alviž.

On May 21, 2021, Raspudić announced that he would end his career at the end of the season and become active as a coach in football.

== International career ==
He played once for Bosnia and Herzegovina, in a December 2010 friendly match against Poland in which he came on as a second-half substitute for Dario Purić.

== Career statistics ==
As of 27 November 2015

Club statistics
Season	Club	League	League		Cup		League Cup		Continental		Total	
Season	Club	League	App	Goals	App	Goals	App	Goals	App	Goals	App	Goals
2014	DPMM FC	S.League	26	2	5	0	5	1	-		36	3
2015	DPMM FC	S.League	25	3	4	1	3	0	-		32	4
Total			51	5	9	1	8	1	-	-	68	7

== Honours ==
Borac Banja Luka

- Premier League of Bosnia and Herzegovina: 2010–11

DPMM FC

- S.League: 2015
- Singapore League Cup: 2014
