= Franco Chiviló =

Argentine footballer

Personal information
- Full name: Franco Axel Chiviló
- Date of birth: 28 April 1991 (age 35)
- Place of birth: Argentina
- Position: Midfielder

Youth career
- 2010–2012: Huracán

Senior career*
Years	Team	Apps	(Gls)
2019–2011	Huracán	2	(0)
2012–2013	Union Magdalena		
2014–2015	Geylang	26	(0)
2015	Deportivo Merlo	39	(3)
2016–2018	All Boys	26	(0)
2018–2019	Platense	7	(0)
2019–2021	Flandria	29	(0)
2021	Estudiantes SL	22	(0)
- * Club domestic league appearances and goals as of 17:08, 6 November 2019 (UTC)

Franco Axel Chiviló (born 28 April 1991) is an Argentine professional soccer player who plays as a midfielder.

== Career ==
Chiviló began his youth career at the Argentine tournament Torneo Clausura 2010, for Club Atlético Huracán. He made his professional footballing debut on 27 February 2010, but has not performed up to par in his career. His club Huracán finished last three in the Primera División and costed them to relegate into a lower division.

Thereafter, he enjoyed a two-year deal with Union Magdalena before joining Geylang International as a marquee player in the S.League in 2014.
