= Thorsten Schneider =

German footballer

Personal information
- Date of birth: 22 December 1987 (age 38)
- Place of birth: Böblingen, Germany
- Height: 1.94 m (6 ft 4 in)
- Position: Attacking midfielder

Senior career*
Years	Team	Apps	(Gls)
2014	Geylang International	5	(1)
2015–	VfL Sindelfingen		
- * Club domestic league appearances and goals

Thorsten Schneider is a German professional footballer who currently plays for VfL Sindelfingen. He plays as a forward and attacking midfielder.

== Career ==
Thorsten Schneider signed a semi-professional contract with a fifth division club in Germany, before joining Geylang International in 2014.

Schneider debuted for the club against Tampines Rovers in the first group match of the 2014 StarHub League Cup. The Eagles won 2–1 against the Stags in that match.

In his second professional match against Warriors in the same competition, he scored his first goal for the club in the second half.
