= Rodrigo Tosi =

Brazilian footballer

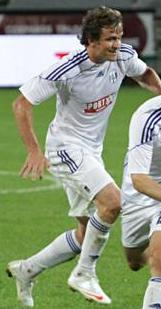
- Tosi playing for Esteghlal in 2012

Personal information
- Full name: Rodrigo Antonio Lombardo Tosi
- Date of birth: 6 January 1983 (age 43)
- Place of birth: Curitiba, Brazil
- Height: 1.84 m (6 ft 0 in)
- Position: Forward

Youth career
- 1993–1999: Paraná
- 1999–2003: Malutrom

Senior career*
Years	Team	Apps	(Gls)
2002–2003	Malutrom		
2004–2005	DPMM		(8)
2006	Joinville		
2007	Iraklis	9	(1)
2008	Wangen bei Olten		
2008–2009	Neuchâtel Xamax	12	(0)
2009–2011	Lausanne-Sport	44	(14)
2011–2012	Tractor	33	(8)
2012–2013	Esteghlal	9	(1)
2013–2014	DPMM	37	(32)
2015	Paraná Clube	6	(1)
2015	Tampines Rovers	23	(14)
2016	Persija Jakarta	28	(4)
2017	Limerick	32	(14)
2020	Indera SC	0	(0)
- * Club domestic league appearances and goals

Rodrigo Antonio Lombardo Tosi (born 6 January 1983) is a Brazilian former professional footballer who played as a forward in Brazil, Malaysia, Greece, Switzerland, Iran, Singapore, Indonesia, Republic of Ireland and Brunei.

== Career ==
In 2013, Tosi signed for Bruneian side DPMM, where he was the top scorer of the 2014 S.League with twenty-four goals.

Tosi joined Tampines Rovers on the S.League transfer deadline day in time for the 2015 S.League season. He terminated his contract with Brazilian Serie B side, Paraná Clube to join the Stags. He replaced Haitian forward Fabrice Noël who left the club on personal reasons. Tosi made his Tampines debut in a televised match against Geylang International in the Eastern Derby.

In 2016, he signed for Indonesian side Persija Jakarta, where he played as a midfielder.

Tosi joined Irish club Limerick on 21 January 2017. He made an immediate impact, scoring a hat trick on his debut against Sligo Rovers and continued to score goals throughout the season, including a number of crucial winning goals late in the season as Limerick avoided a relegation battle.

Tosi joined Indera SC in 2020. During the 2020 AFC Cup, he scored the only Indera SC's goal against Myanmar club Yangon United which ended in a 6–1 defeat.

== Style of play ==
Tosi plays as a forward. He is known for his versatility.

== Career statistics ==
Appearances and goals by club, season and competition
Club	Season	League			State League		National cup		League cup		Continental		Total	
Club	Season	Division	Apps	Goals	Apps	Goals	Apps	Goals	Apps	Goals	Apps	Goals	Apps	Goals
Malutrom	2004	Campeonato Paranaense	–		10	0			–		–		10	0
Araucária	2005	Campeonato Paranaense B	–		11	10			–		–		11	10
Joinville	2007	Campeonato Catarinense	–		11	5			–		–		11	5
Iraklis	2007–08	Super League Greece	9	1	–				–		–		9	1
FC Wangen bei Olten	2008	1. Liga Classic	8	9	–				–		–		8	9
Neuchâtel Xamax	2008–09	Swiss Super League	12	0	–				–		–		12	8
Lausanne-Sport	2009–10	Swiss Challenge League	22	8	–		4	3	–		–		26	11
Lausanne-Sport	2010–11	Swiss Challenge League	21	6	–		0	0	–		9	1	30	7
Lausanne-Sport	Total		43	14	0	0	4	3	0	0	9	1	56	18
Tractor	2011–12	Iran Pro League	33	8	–		0	0	–		–		33	8
Esteghlal	2012–13	Iran Pro League	9	1	–		0	0	–		–		9	1
DPMM	2013	S.League	12	8	–		2	0	4	0	–		18	8
DPMM	2014	S.League	26	24	–		6	7	4	3	–		36	34
DPMM	Total		38	32	0	0	8	7	8	3	0	0	54	42
Paraná Clube	2015	Campeonato Paranaense	–		6	1			–		–		6	1
Tampines Rovers	2015	S.League	32	17	–		2	0	–		–		34	17
Persija Jakarta	2016	Indonesia Soccer Championship A	28	4	–		0	0	–		–		28	4
Limerick	2017	League of Ireland Premier Division	32	14	–		3	2	0	0	–		35	16
Indera SC	2020	Brunei Super League	–		–		1	1	–		–		1	1
Career total			291	110	37	16	16	11	8	3	9	1	361	141

== Honours ==
Lausanne Sport

- Swiss Challenge League: 2009-10

Esteghlal

- Iran Pro League: 2012-13

DPMM

- Singapore League Cup: 2014

Individual

- S.League Top Scorer: 2014
