= Kim Min-ho (footballer, born 1997) =

South Korean footballer

Personal information
- Date of birth: 11 June 1997 (age 29)
- Place of birth: South Korea
- Height: 1.88 m (6 ft 2 in)
- Position: Defender

Team information
- Current team: Paju Frontier
- Number: 81

Youth career
- –2017: Yonsei University

Senior career*
Years	Team	Apps	(Gls)
2018–2020	Suwon Samsung Bluewings	1	(0)
2020–2022	Ansan Greeners	55	(1)
2023–2025	Gimpo FC	57	(1)
2026–	Paju Frontier	11	(0)

International career^{‡}
2015	South Korea U18	3	(1)
- * Club domestic league appearances and goals as of 6 August 2026 ‡ National team caps and goals as of 19 August 2019, 17:04 (UTC)

- Kim Min-ho
- Hangul: 김민호
- RR: Gim Minho
- MR: Kim Minho

Kim Min-ho (Korean: 김민호; born 11 June 1997) is a South Korean footballer currently playing as a defender for Paju Frontier.

== Career ==
On 2 January 2026, Kim Min-ho announce official signing to K League 2 promoted club, Paju Frontier for 2026 season.

== Club statistics ==
As of 19 August 2019.

Club	Season	League			Cup		Other		Total	
Club	Season	Division	Apps	Goals	Apps	Goals	Apps	Goals	Apps	Goals
Suwon Samsung Bluewings	2018	K League 1	0	0	0	0	0	0	0	0
Suwon Samsung Bluewings	2019	K League 1	1	0	0	0	0	0	1	0
Career total			1	0	0	0	0	0	1	0
