= Big Hardee =

Hamburger made by Hardee's

The Big Hardee is a hamburger sandwich offered by Hardee's. The original Big Hardee was introduced in 1995 and was designed to compete against McDonald's Big Mac or Burger King's Whopper.

== History ==
The Big Hardee burger was first rolled out chainwide in the fall of 1995. Additionally, Hardee's sister chain, Carl's Jr. also introduced its version of the Big Hardee, The Big Carl. The Big Hardee debuted in a commercial with the Big Mac sandwich, and had a jingle that goes, "More meat, more cheese, less money. La la la la la."

It was re-released in 2009. When the Big Hardee became available in September 2009, it sold for $2.29; at the time, this was around 70 cents less than the average Big Mac price. CKE Restaurants had, that August, also re-released the Big Carl. The Big Hardee was reintroduced in response to McDonald's inclusion of Angus beef into its own sandwich lineup. The Big Hardee was launched in conjunction with an ad campaign that the Los Angeles Times said was aimed at "belittling" the Big Mac.

In Mar. 2025, Hardee's still sold the Big Hardee as one of its 18 burgers, with the sandwich listed as having 920 calories.

== Description ==
The sandwich features three 9:1 (9 patties = 1 pound) beef patties, two slices of American cheese, shredded lettuce and Big Twin Sauce on a 4-inch seeded bun. The sandwich averages 920 calories, 58g of fat and 1380 mg of sodium.
