= Joaquin Lopez (Argentine footballer) =

Argentine footballer

Personal information
- Full name: Joaquin Guillermo Lopez
- Date of birth: 6 January 1995 (age 31)
- Place of birth: Argentina
- Position: Forward

Senior career*
Years	Team	Apps	(Gls)
2014–2015	Geylang International	24	(0)
- * Club domestic league appearances and goals

Joaquin Lopez (born 6 January 1995) is an Argentine professional footballer who last played for Geylang International in the S.League. He plays as an attacker.

== Youth career ==
At the age of 18, Lopez made his professional footballing debut on 23 February 2014. He was influential in the match and played the full 90 minutes despite the Eagles losing 2–1 to Warriors.

Joaquin Lopez was being scouted by the club during a tour to Argentina, and he was one of the three Argentine men's footballers that joined Geylang International on the same day.

Lopez finally scored his first professional goal in his career, which turned out to be an important header as it drew the Eagles level on aggregate in the 2014 Singapore Cup quarter-finals.
