= Hafiz Nor =

Singaporean footballer (born 1988)

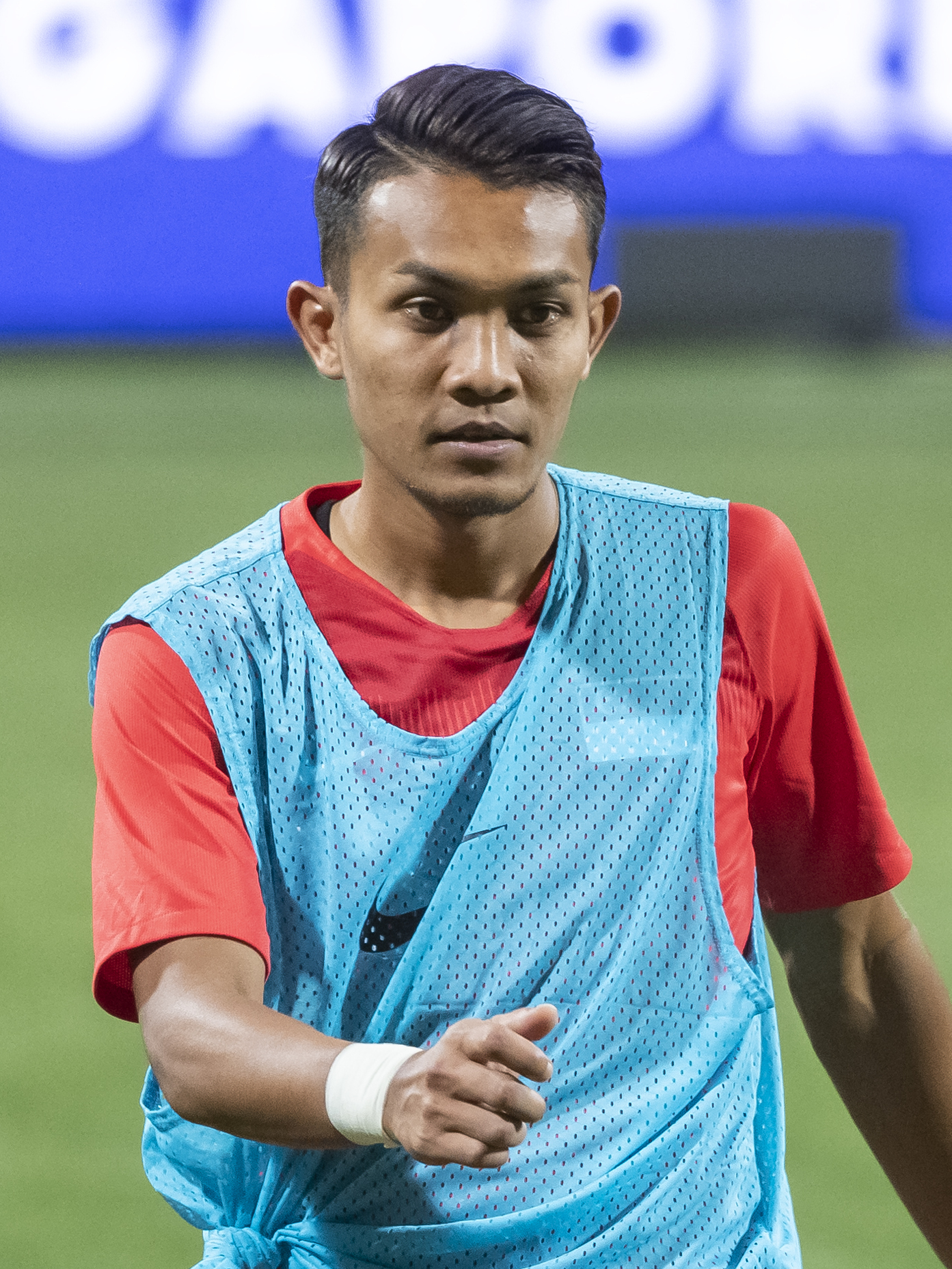
- Hafiz warming up for Singapore in 2019

Personal information
- Full name: Mohd Hafiz bin Mohd Nor
- Date of birth: 22 August 1988 (age 38)
- Place of birth: Singapore
- Height: 1.69 m (5 ft 7 in)
- Positions: Winger; full-back

Senior career*
Years	Team	Apps	(Gls)
2011	Tanjong Pagar United	12	(3)
2012	Home United	5	(0)
2012–2013	Tanjong Pagar United	36	(3)
2014–2015	Geylang International	53	(4)
2016–2017	Warriors	29	(3)
2018–2026	Lion City Sailors	127	(25)

International career
2013–	Singapore	29	(2)
- * Club domestic league appearances and goals

Mohd Hafiz bin Mohd Nor (born 22 August 1988) is a Singaporean professional footballer who plays as a winger or full-back for the Singapore national team.

== Club career ==
=== Tanjong Pagar United ===
A late bloomer, Hafiz began his professional football career with Tanjong Pagar United in the S.League in 2011, at the age of 22. After joining Home United in 2012, Hafiz return to Tanjong Pagar in the mid transfer for the remaining of the 2012 and 2013 S.League season. He won the S.League Goal of the Season award in 2013 and earned himself his first call-up for Singapore.

=== Home United ===
After a one year stint with Tanjong Pagar United, it was announced that Hafiz would join Home United for the 2012 S.League season.

=== Geylang International ===
It was announced in 2014 that Hafiz would join Geylang International.

=== Warriors ===
Hafiz joined Warriors in 2016 and that was where he was recalled up to the national team.

=== Lion City Sailors ===
Hafiz rejoined Home United in 2017 and racked up his most productive season in the 2019 Singapore Premier League season with the Protectors, scoring 9 goals in all competitions. In 2021, Hafiz was part of the winning squad that won the 2021 Singapore Premier League. In 2022, he was named the club vice-captain. On 9 December 2023, Hafiz and club captain Hariss Harun lifted the 2023 Singapore Cup after winning against defending champion, Hougang United 3–1. On 15 December 2023, Lion City Sailors announce that Hafiz has extended his contract with the club becoming the club longest serving player since its privatised era.

Despite Maxime Lestienne's equaliser in the 91st minute of the 2025 AFC Champions League Two final against Sharjah, the Sailors finished as a runner-up after conceding in the 97th minute to finish the game in a 1–2 defeat.

== International career ==
He received his first call-up to the Singapore in 2013, making his international debut in the 5–2 victory over Laos on 7 June 2013. He gained his second international cap against Cambodia on 28 July 2016, replacing Hafiz Sujad in the 68th minute.

Hafiz had to wait a further 3 years again before gaining another call-up. However, after winning his 3rd cap, he is set to be a fixture in the Singapore team to come as Head Coach Tatsuma Yoshida credits him with bringing energy and discipline to the Lions and is set to name Hafiz for a third straight start in the World Cup qualifier. Hafiz then repaid the coach's faith as he scored his first goal for Singapore in his sixth cap when he scored the winner in a 2–1 win over Yemen in a 2022 FIFA World Cup qualification match. He scored his second goal for the Lions when he unleashed a first-time volley off Nur Adam Abdullah's cross from the left in a 6–2 win over Myanmar in the final match of their Asian Cup third-round qualifiers.

In 2022, Hafiz was part of the national team for the 2022 AFF Championship.

== Career statistics ==
=== Club ===
As of match played 30 May 2026. Caps and goals may not be correct.

Club	Season	S.League		Singapore Cup		Singapore League Cup / Others		Asia		Total	
Club	Season	Apps	Goals	Apps	Goals	Apps	Goals	Apps	Goals	Apps	Goals
Tanjong Pagar	2011	12	3	-	-	-	-	—		12	3
Tanjong Pagar	Total	12	3	0	0	0	0	0	0	12	3
Home United	2012	5	0	1	0	-	-	3	0	9	0
Home United	Total	5	0	1	0	0	0	3	0	9	0
Tanjong Pagar	2012	11	0	5	1	3	0	—		19	1
Tanjong Pagar	2013	25	3	-	-	2	1	—		27	4
Tanjong Pagar	Total	36	3	5	1	5	1	0	0	46	5
Geylang International	2014	26	2	3	1	4	2	—		33	5
Geylang International	2015	27	2	3	1	4	3	—		34	6
Geylang International	Total	53	4	6	2	8	5	0	0	67	11
Warriors	2016	21	3	1	0	-	-	—		22	3
Warriors	2017	0	0	0	0	0	0	—		0	0
Warriors	Total	21	3	1	0	0	0	0	0	22	3
Home United	2018	23	7	5	1	0	0	10	1	38	9
Home United	2019	20	6	3	0	0	0	7	3	29	9
Home United	Total	43	13	8	1	0	0	17	1	67	18
Lion City Sailors	2020	14	1	0	0	0	0	0	0	14	1
Lion City Sailors	2021	11	1	0	0	0	0	0	0	11	1
Lion City Sailors	2022	27	3	3	0	1	0	3	0	34	3
Lion City Sailors	2023	22	2	6	0	0	0	5	0	33	2
Lion City Sailors	2024–25	22	0	1	0	0	0	7	0	30	0
Lion City Sailors	2025–26	9	0	1	0	0	0	3	0	13	0
Lion City Sailors	Total	105	7	11	0	1	0	18	0	135	7
Career Total		247	24	29	4	14	6	31	1	321	35

=== International ===
Appearances and goals by national team and year
National team	Year	Apps	Goals
Singapore
Singapore	2013	1	0
Singapore	2016	1	0
Singapore	2019	4	1
Singapore	2021	4	0
Total		10	1

==== International caps ====
No	Date	Venue	Opponent	Result	Competition
1	7 June 2013	New Laos National Stadium, Vientiane, Laos	Laos	2–5 (won)	Friendly
2	28 July 2016	Phnom Penh Olympic Stadium, Phnom Penh, Cambodia	Cambodia	1–2 (lost)	Friendly
3	10 September 2019	Jalan Besar Stadium, Kallang, Singapore	Palestine	2-1 (won)	2022 FIFA World Cup qualification – AFC second round
4	15 October 2019	National Stadium, Kallang, Singapore	Uzbekistan	1-3 (lost)	2022 FIFA World Cup qualification – AFC second round
5	14 November 2019	Abdullah bin Khalifa Stadium, Doha, Qatar	Qatar	0-2 (lost)	Friendly
6	19 November 2019	Shaikh Ali Bin Mohammed Al-Khalifa Stadium, Muharraq, Bahrain	Yemen	2-1 (won)	2022 FIFA World Cup qualification – AFC second round
7	3 June 2021	King Fahd International Stadium, Riyadh, Saudi Arabia	Palestine	0-4 (lost)	2022 FIFA World Cup qualification – AFC second round
9	22 December 2021	National Stadium, Kallang, Singapore	Indonesia	1-1(draw)	2020 AFF Championship
10	25 December 2021	National Stadium, Kallang, Singapore	Indonesia	4-2(lost)	2020 AFF Championship
12	8 June 2022	Dolen Omurzakov Stadium, Bishkek, Kyrgyzstan	Kyrgyzstan	1–2	2023 AFC Asian Cup qualification
14	11 June 2022	Dolen Omurzakov Stadium, Bishkek, Kyrgyzstan	Tajikistan	0–1	2023 AFC Asian Cup qualification
14	14 June 2022	Dolen Omurzakov Stadium, Bishkek, Kyrgyzstan	Myanmar	6–2	2023 AFC Asian Cup qualification
15	21 Sept 2022	Thống Nhất Stadium, Ho Chi Minh City, Vietnam	Vietnam	0-4 (lost)	2022 VFF Tri-Nations Series
16	24 Sept 2022	Thống Nhất Stadium, Ho Chi Minh City, Vietnam	India	1-1 (draw)	2022 VFF Tri-Nations Series
17	17 December 2022	Jalan Besar Stadium, Kallang, Singapore	Maldives	3-2(lost)	2020 AFF Championship
18	24 December 2022	Jalan Besar Stadium, Kallang, Singapore	Myanmar	3-2(won)	2022 AFF Championship
19	27 December 2022	New Laos National Stadium, Vientiane, Laos	Laos	2-0(won)	2022 AFF Championship
20	23 March 2023	Mong Kok Stadium, Hong Kong	Hong Kong	1–1	Friendly
21	16 June 2023	National Stadium, Singapore	Papua New Guinea	2-2	Friendly
22	8 Sept 2023	Bishan Stadium, Singapore	Tajikistan	0-2 (lost)	Friendly

==== International goals ====
Scores and results list Singapore's goal tally first.

No.	Date	Venue	Opponent	Score	Result	Competition
1.	19 November 2019	Al Muharraq Stadium, Muharraq, Bahrain	Yemen	2–0	2–1	2022 FIFA World Cup qualification
2.	14 June 2022	Dolen Omurzakov Stadium, Bishkek, Kyrgyzstan	Myanmar	6–2	6–2	2023 AFC Asian Cup qualification

== Honours ==
=== Club ===
Lion City Sailors

- AFC Champions League Two runner-up: 2024–25
- Singapore Premier League: 2021, 2024–25
- Singapore Cup: 2023, 2024–25, 2025–26
- Singapore Community Shield: 2022, 2024; runner-up: 2025

=== Individual ===
- Singapore Premier League Team of the Year: 2018
