= Song In-young =

South Korean association football player

Personal information
- Full name: Song In-young
- Date of birth: January 7, 1990 (age 36)
- Place of birth: Daejeon, South Korea
- Height: 1.85 m (6 ft 1 in)
- Position: Forward

Youth career
- Yewon Arts University

Senior career*
Years	Team	Apps	(Gls)
2011	Roasso Kumamoto	18	(2)
2012	Suwon City	11	(2)
2014	Home United	14	(2)
- * Club domestic league appearances and goals

- Korean name
- Hangul: 송인영
- RR: Song Inyeong
- MR: Song Inyŏng

Song In-young (Korean: 송인영; born 7 January 1990) is a South Korean football player who last played for Home United. He spent single seasons representing J2 League club Roasso Kumamoto and K League 1 club Suwon City before moving to Singapore in 2014 to join Home United – now known as the Lion City Sailors.

== Club career ==
=== Roasso Kumamoto ===
Song briefly joined J.League Division 2 side Roasso Kumamoto in 2011. During his one season stint with the Japanese side, he made a total of 18 competitive appearances for the team, with 12 appearances coming off the bench. He scored 2 goals for the Japanese side.

=== Suwon City ===
Following a short spell with Roasso Kumamoto, Song returned to South Korea and joined Suwon City to partake in the Korea National League for the 2012 season. Song made a total of 11 competitive appearances, with 5 appearances coming off the bench for his club. He scored 2 goals against Cheonan City and Chungju Hummel to secure a 1–2 and 2–1 win respectively for his side.

=== Club ===
Club	Season	League			Emperor's Cup		League Cup / Others		ACL/AFC Cup		Total	
Club	Season	Division	Apps	Goals	Apps	Goals	Apps	Goals	Apps	Goals	Apps	Goals
Roasso Kumamoto	2011	J.League Division 2	18	2	0	0	0	0	0	0	18	2
Roasso Kumamoto	Total		18	2	0	0	0	0	0	0	18	2
Club	Season	League			FA Cup		League Cup / Others		ACL/AFC Cup		Total	
Club	Season	Division	Apps	Goals	Apps	Goals	Apps	Goals	Apps	Goals	Apps	Goals
Suwon City	2012	Korea National League	11	2	0	0	0	0	0	0	11	2
Suwon City	Total		11	2	0	0	0	0	0	0	11	2
Club	Season	League			Singapore Cup		League Cup / Others		AFC Cup		Total	
Club	Season	Division	Apps	Goals	Apps	Goals	Apps	Goals	Apps	Goals	Apps	Goals
Home United	2014	S.League	14	2	5	1	3	0	1	0	23	3
Home United	Total		14	2	5	1	3	0	1	0	23	3
Career total			43	6	5	1	3	0	1	0	52	7
