= Joseph Taylor (footballer, born 1996) =

Australian soccer player

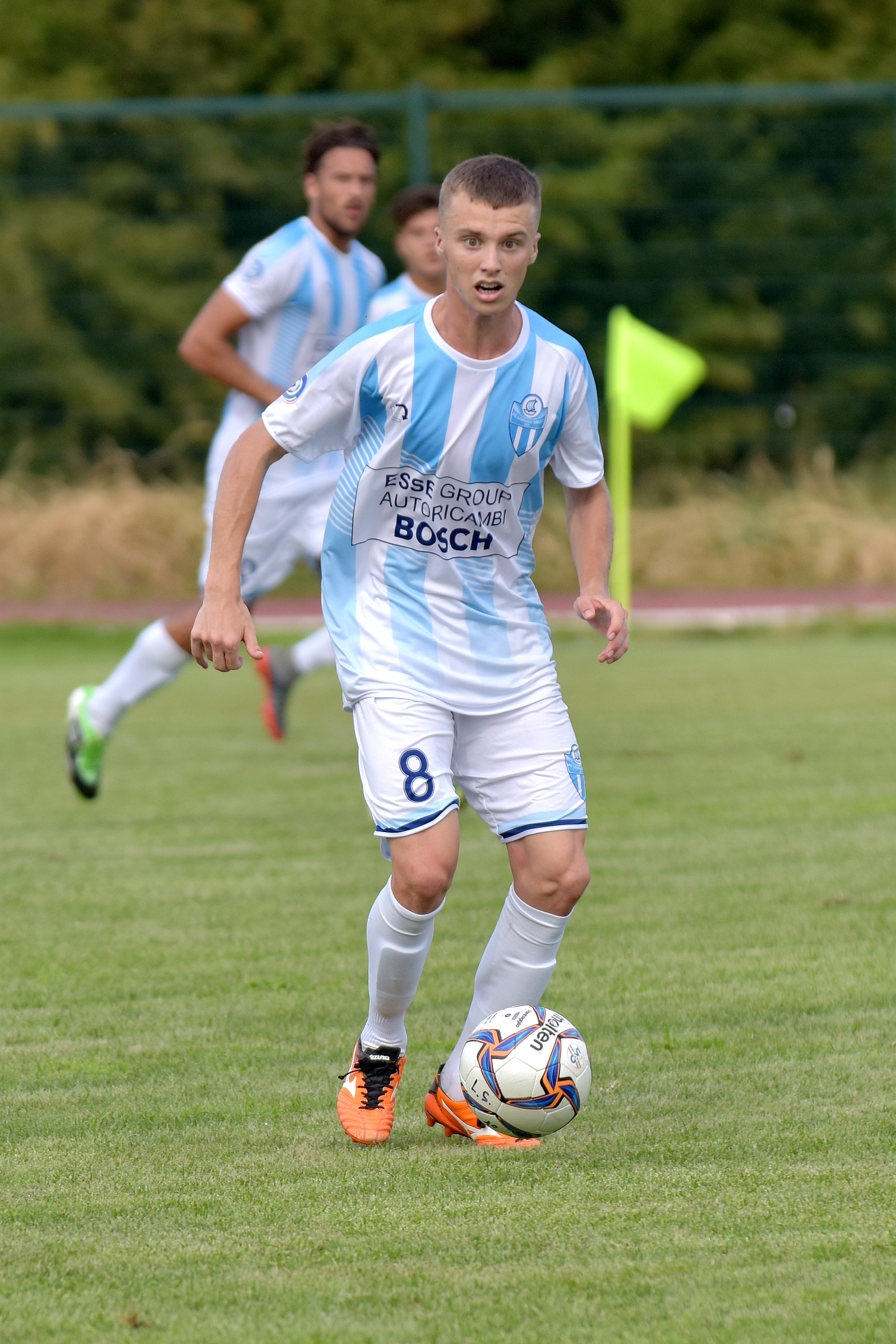

Personal information
- Full name: Joseph Brian Taylor-Mountford
- Date of birth: 22 July 1996 (age 30)
- Place of birth: Sydney, Australia
- Height: 1.83 m (6 ft 0 in)
- Position: Attacking midfielder

Team information
- Current team: Congleton Town

Youth career
- 2012–2013: Home United

Senior career*
Years	Team	Apps	(Gls)
2014	Tampines Rovers	2	(0)
2015	AC Castellana	0	(0)
2015–2019	Legnago Salus	82	(5)
2019–	Congleton Town	14	(1)
- * Club domestic league appearances and goals as of 16:35, 2 January 2020 (UTC)

Joseph Taylor-Mountford (born 22 July 1996) is an Australian professional footballer who played for S.League club Tampines Rovers as an attacking midfielder during the 2014 FAS Season.

== Career ==
Taylor's father, Bill, works as an I.T. executive in Singapore. The family joined him two years after he came to Singapore. Taylor had a successful trial with Home United and was accepted into their academy team.

In 2013, he was invited by the professional lead coach of Wolverhampton Wanderers's academy, Mick Halsall, for trials with the League One club.

On returning from the UK to continue his studies in Singapore, Taylor joined Tampines Rover's Prime League team in 2014. He was promoted to their S.League squad and made his league debut in a 1–1 draw away to Tanjong Pagar United on 25 April.

On 1 January 2015 Taylor completed a transfer and signature to join AC Castellana, who play in Serie D, Girone B in the North of Italy. This was arranged by scouts for AC Milan and his agent Marco Ottollini. After a lengthy period of delays in work permit administration and an injury, Taylor was included in the first team Squad to play Atletico Montichiari and was an unused substitute in the 1–0 win on 22 February 2015. At the season close, Taylor was signed by FC Legnago Salus for the 2016/17 season and then again for the 2017/18 season. After missing part of the 2017 season with an injury, Taylor returned to first team duties in January 2018, playing an influential role in several appearances, scoring twice and contributing 2 assists in a 6-game period.

In the summer 2019, Taylor joined English club Congleton Town.
