= Luis Closa =

Paraguayan footballer (born 1984)

Personal information
- Full name: Luis Alberto Closa González
- Date of birth: 10 March 1984 (age 42)
- Place of birth: Asunción, Paraguay
- Height: 1.81 m (5 ft 11 1/2 in)
- Position: Midfielder

Senior career*
Years	Team	Apps	(Gls)
2005–2006	12 de Octubre		
2007	Martín Ledesma		
2008–2010	Rubio Ñu		
2011	Deportes Tolima	9	(1)
2011	Rubio Ñu	9	(1)
2012	Atlético Sarmiento		
2012	Sport Boys	5	(0)
2013	Martín Ledesma		
2013	San Lorenzo		
2014	Tampines Rovers	11	(4)
2014–2015	San José	10	(1)
- * Club domestic league appearances and goals

Luis Alberto Closa (born 10 March 1984), commonly known as Luis Closa, is a Paraguayan professional footballer who played as a midfielder.

== Career ==
Luis Closa has played for 10 professional clubs in his career, in countries like Paraguay, Colombia, Argentina, Peru and Singapore. He started off his career with 12 de Octubre, before moving out of Paraguay to Columbia to join Deportes Tolima.

Although he returned to Paraguayan side Club Rubio Ñu in 2011, he left for Argentina in 2012, before returning to his home country in 2013. He subsequently joined five-time S.League champions Tampines Rovers in 2014.
