= Kim Min-ho (footballer, born 1991) =

South Korean footballer (born 1991)

Personal information
- Date of birth: 28 December 1991 (age 33)
- Place of birth: South Korea
- Height: 1.82 m (6 ft 0 in)
- Position(s): Forward

Senior career*
Years	Team	Apps	(Gls)
2012–2014	Balestier Khalsa	47	(14)
- * Club domestic league appearances and goals

Kim Min-ho (Korean: 김민호; born 28 December 1991) is a South Korean former professional footballer.

== Career ==
Brought to Singapore S.League team Balestier Khalsa on the recommendations of teammate Park Kang-jin, Kim lived with him through his stay there. However, he found it difficult to adapt as he was unable to communicate with anybody but his club was able to fund English lessons for him.

Even though he scored in the 2014 Singapore Cup final and the 2013 Singapore League Cup, Kim was released, going back to his homeland to take up a job in screen baseball instead.

Made the Goal.com S.League Team of the Week for Round 13 in 2013 with a goal in a 2–2 tie with Geylang International.

== Personal life ==
Kim was born in South Korea. He had not learned English in school, and was reticent when having to speak it in Singapore.
