= Miloš Jevtić =

Serbian footballer

Personal information
- Full name: Miloš Jevtić
- Date of birth: November 3, 1989 (age 36)
- Place of birth: SFR Yugoslavia
- Height: 1.86 m (6 ft 1 in)
- Position: Defender

Senior career*
Years	Team	Apps	(Gls)
2007–2009	BSK Borča	0	(0)
2008	→ PKB Padinska Skela (loan)	4	(0)
2009	→ Sinđelić (loan)	12	(0)
2009–2012	Sinđelić	77	(5)
2012	PKB Padinska Skela	13	(1)
2013	Dorćol	10	(0)
2014–2015	Woodlands Wellington	18	(1)
2015	Hajduk Beograd		
2017–2018	PSK Provo		
2020–2021	Kaluđerica		
2023	Karađorđe Mišar		
- * Club domestic league appearances and goals

Miloš Jevtić (born November 3, 1989) is a professional Serbian football player who plays as a defender.

== Career ==
Jevtić joined the S.League in 2014 with the Rams. Previously, he played with FK Dorćol in Serbian League Belgrade.
