= Mustaqim Manzur =

Singaporean footballer

Personal information
- Full name: Mustaqim bin Manzur Ahmed Khan
- Date of birth: 28 January 1982 (age 44)
- Place of birth: Singapore
- Height: 1.77 m (5 ft 9 1/2 in)
- Position: Midfielder

Team information
- Current team: Geylang International FC
- Number: 7

Youth career
- National Football Academy

Senior career*
Years	Team	Apps	(Gls)
2001–2002	Home United	7	(0)
2003–2004	Young Lions	44	(5)
2005–2011	Singapore Armed Forces	118	(17)
2012	Gombak United	20	(6)
2013	Home United	7	(0)
2014–2015	Geylang International	39	(0)

International career^{‡}
2003–2006	Singapore	6	(0)
- * Club domestic league appearances and goals as of January 06, 2014 ‡ National team caps and goals as of January 06, 2014

Mustaqim bin Manzur Ahmed Khan (born 28 January 1982) is a former professional football player who last played for Singapore Premier League club Geylang International FC and the Singapore national football team. He was a natural left winger, though he can also play as a right winger.

== Club career ==
Mustaqim has previously played for S.League clubs Gombak United, Singapore Armed Forces FC, Home United and Young Lions.

== International career ==
Mustaqim made his debut for the Singapore against Qatar on 19 November 2003.

== Honours ==
=== Club ===
Singapore Armed Forces

- S.League: 2006, 2007, 2008, 2009
- Singapore Cup: 2007, 2008
