= Leonel Felice =

Argentine professional footballer

Personal information
- Full name: Leonel Ezequiel Felice
- Date of birth: 31 August 1983 (age 43)
- Place of birth: Argentina
- Height: 1.85 m (6 ft 1 in)
- Position: Striker

Team information
- Current team: Geylang International
- Number: 9

Youth career
- 2001–2004: Arsenal de Sarandí

Senior career*
Years	Team	Apps	(Gls)
2005–2006	Quilmes Atlético Club	21	(1)
2008–2012	Club Rivadavia	92	(29)
2012–2013	Hanoi T&T FC	35	(15)
2013–2014	Than Quảng Ninh FC	32	(22)
2014–2015	Geylang International	30	(16)
2015–	Jorge Newbery de Villa Mercedes	2	(1)
- * Club domestic league appearances and goals

Leonel Ezequiel Felice (born 31 April 1983) is an Argentine professional footballer who plays for S.League club Geylang International, as a striker.

== Career ==
Leonel Felice started his youth career in Arsenal Fútbol Club in Argentina before moving to Quilmes Atlético Club in 2005. In 2006, he was released by Quilmes and was clubless for a year before joining Club Rivadavia in 2008 and spent 4 years with the club before moving to Vietnamese club Hanoi T&T in 2012. He then signed with Geylang International in 2014, which plays in the S.League and proved to be a prolific goalscorer at his present club, scoring 16 goals in his debut season with the club.
