= Sébastien Etiemble =

French footballer (born 1987)

Personal information
- Date of birth: 22 October 1987 (age 39)
- Place of birth: Rennes, France
- Height: 1.74 m (5 ft 8 1/2 in)
- Position: Midfielder

Team information
- Current team: Ayeyawady United
- Number: 28

Senior career*
Years	Team	Apps	(Gls)
2006–2007	Stade Lavallois B		
2007–2008	Stade Lavallois	8	(0)
2008–2009	La Vitréenne	24	
2009–2010	Jura Sud Foot	34	(5)
2010–2012	AFC Compiègne	62	(8)
2012–2013	US Quevilly	35	(0)
2014–2016	Tanjong Pagar United	25	(8)
2016	GSI Pontivy	13	(1)
2017–2018	Ayeyawady United	19	(5)
- * Club domestic league appearances and goals as of 13 January 2017

Sébastien Etiemble (born 22 October 1987) is a French professional footballer who currently plays for Tanjong Pagar United in the S.League. He plays as a midfielder. In December 2016, he moved to Ayeyawady United.

== Early life ==
Etiemble was born on 22 October 1987 in Rennes, France. He was born to two French athletes.

== Youth career ==
Etiemble started playing professional football at the age of 23. In his hometown, he has played in the Championnat de France amateur and Championnat de France amateur 2, for the clubs US Quevilly and AFC Compiègne respectively.

Etiemble then went on to play in the S.League with Tanjong Pagar United, and has since contributed to the club in many ways. The transfer was made possible through the French connection with manager Patrick Vallée.

== Personal life ==
Etiemble's parents are natives of Côtes-d'Armor, France. He has been married.
