= 2013 Singapore League Cup =

Final positions
- Champions: Balestier Khalsa
- Runners-up: (Brunei) DPMM FC

The 2013 Singapore League Cup (known as the Starhub League Cup for sponsorship purposes) is a cup competition played in the month of June 2013.

The draw for the Cup was held on Sunday, 12 May 2013 at the Football Association of Singapore's headquarters in Jalan Besar Stadium, Singapore. Apart from the teams in the S.League which participated in the Starhub League Cup, the 2013 edition also saw an NFL side qualify for the cup draw following a playoff between four sides: Singapore Recreation Club and Singapore Cricket Club, who are the NFL Division 1 Champions and Runners-up, and Admiralty Football Club and Sporting Westlake FC, who are the NFL Division 2 Champions and Runners-up.

Admiralty FC made it through to the tournament proper; after trailing 0-1 they scored three goals to defeat Singapore Recreation Club 3-1.

The League Cup semi finals, League Cup final and Plate final were originally scheduled to be played on 20 June 2013 and 23 June 2013 respectively but were postponed to September 2013 in view of the worsening haze conditions in Singapore.

== Preliminary playoffs ==
The semi-finals of the preliminary playoffs were played on 5 May 2013.

Admiralty FC beat Singapore Cricket Club 2-1 in the first semi-final, while Singapore Recreation Club edged out Sporting Westlake 1-0 in the other semi-final.

The final of the preliminary playoffs was held on 12 May 2013 at 5pm, just before the League Cup draw was held at the same venue. Admiralty FC prevailed against Singapore Recreation Club despite going behind after 21 minutes; the Wolves triumphed after former S.League players, Jonathan Xu and Guntur Djafril, as well as former football reality show First XI contestant, Haziq Sudhir, each scored a goal to reverse the score in Admiralty's favour.

As an added incentive for the NFL side, a $2,000 prize money was also presented to the winning team on top of successfully progressing into the 2013 StarHub League Cup. This new move by the S.League is aimed at giving NFL teams an opportunity to experience the professional competitiveness level of a cup competition.

=== Preliminary Playoffs Knockout stage ===
Semifinals
S1	Admiralty FC	2
S2	Singapore Cricket Club	1
S3	SRC	1
S4	Sporting Westlake	0

Finals
SF1	Admiralty FC	3
SF2	SRC	1

=== Preliminary Playoff Semi-finals ===
5 May 2013
17:00

Admiralty FC	2 - 1	Singapore Cricket Club
Guntur Djafril 18'; Matthew Shiva 39' (pen)	Report	45' Chang Guo Guang

Jalan Besar Stadium

5 May 2013
19:00

Singapore Recreation Club	1 - 0	Sporting Westlake
Jonathan Lancry 73'	Report

Jalan Besar Stadium

=== Preliminary Playoff final ===
12 May 2013
17:00

Admiralty FC	3 - 1	Singapore Recreation Club
Jonathan Xu 43'; Guntur Djafril 57'; Haziq Sudhir 93'	Report	21' Shaiful Fauzi

== First round ==
The 2013 Starhub League Cup draw was held at Jalan Besar Stadium on 12 May 2013 following Admiralty FC's victory over Singapore Recreation Club, ensuring the NFL Division One side's inclusion in the 2013 edition of the Cup.

Harimau Muda B, Woodlands Wellington, Home United and preliminary playoff winners Admiralty FC were drawn into Group A, while Tampines Rovers, Courts Young Lions and Tanjong Pagar United made up Group B.

Albirex Niigata (S), Hougang United and Geylang International were drawn into Group C and Brunei DPMM, Balestier Khalsa and Warriors F.C. made up Group D, which is also known as the "Cup Winners" group due to the three being the previous season's RHB Singapore Cup winners, League Cup Plate winners and League Cup winners.

The League Cup was originally scheduled to be played within the month of June in a round robin format with the original fixtures announced by FAS on 21 May 2013. However, due to the haze conditions in Singapore, the League Cup semi finals, League Cup final and Plate final, which were originally scheduled to be played on 20 June 2013 and 23 June 2013 respectively, were postponed to September 2013.

== Preliminary stage ==
Group A: Admiralty FC (Preliminary Playoff Winners), Harimau Muda B, Home United, Woodlands Wellington

Group B: Young Lions FC, Tampines Rovers, Tanjong Pagar United

Group C: Albirex Niigata (S), Geylang International, Hougang United

Group D: Balestier Khalsa, DPMM FC, Warriors FC

Key to colours in group tables
Group winners and runners-up advance to the quarter-finals of the 2013 StarHub League Cup.
Third-placed teams enter the semi-finals of the 2013 Plate Competition.

=== Group A ===
Pos	Team	Pld	W	D	L	GF	GA	GD	Pts
1	Home United (A)	3	3	0	0	10	0	+10	9
2	Woodlands Wellington (A)	3	2	0	1	4	4	0	6
3	(Malaysia) Harimau Muda B	3	1	0	2	2	5	−3	3
4	Admiralty FC	3	0	0	3	3	10	−7	0

Updated to match(es) played on 11 June 2013. Source: sleague.com
Rules for classification: 1) points; 2) goal difference; 3) number of goals scored.
(A) Advance to a further round

==== Matches ====
5 June 2013 First round	Harimau Muda B (Malaysia)	0 - 3	Home United	Jalan Besar Stadium, Singapore
19:30 (UTC+8)		Details	54' (pen.) Sirina Camara; 59' Aliff Shafaein; 76' Song Ui-Young	Referee: Irwan Samsuddin

5 June 2013 First round	Woodlands Wellington	3 - 2	Admiralty FC	Woodlands Stadium, Singapore
19:30 (UTC+8)	Chang Jo-Yoon 50', 85'; Oswind Suriya 82'	Details	4' Andrew Hutcheon; 37' Mohamad Helmi Mohamad	Referee: Ahmad A'Qashah

8 June 2013 First round	Woodlands Wellington	1 - 0	(Malaysia) Harimau Muda B	Woodlands Stadium, Singapore
19:30 (UTC+8)	Oswind Suriya 22'	Details		Referee: Muhd Taqi

8 June 2013 First round	Home United	5 - 0	Admiralty FC	Bishan Stadium, Singapore
19:30 (UTC+8)	Jordan Webb 6'; Ismail Yunos 15' (pen) Firdaus Idros 22'; Masrezwan Masturi 58'; Aliff Shafaein 65'	Details		Referee: Leow Thiam Hoe

11 June 2013 First round	Admiralty FC	1 - 2	(Malaysia) Harimau Muda B	Jalan Besar Stadium, Singapore
19:30 (UTC+8)	Andrew Hutcheon 6'	Details	Iskandar Hanapiah 43'; Faizat Ghazli 63'	Referee: W Ravisanthiran

11 June 2013 First round	Home United	2 - 0	Woodlands Wellington	Bishan Stadium, Singapore
19:30 (UTC+8)	Masrezwan Masturi 42'; Aliff Shafaein 53'	Details		Referee: Farhad Mohd

=== Group B ===
Pos	Team	Pld	W	D	L	GF	GA	GD	Pts
1	Tanjong Pagar United (A)	2	1	0	1	4	2	+2	3
2	Tampines Rovers (A)	2	1	0	1	4	4	0	3
3	(Singapore) Young Lions FC	2	1	0	1	3	5	−2	3

Updated to match(es) played on 9 June 2013. Source: sleague.com
Rules for classification: 1) points; 2) goal difference; 3) number of goals scored.
(A) Advance to a further round

==== Matches ====
6 June 2013 First round	Tanjong Pagar United	3 - 0	(Singapore) Young Lions FC	Queenstown Stadium, Singapore
19:30 (UTC+8)	Kamel Ramdani 5'; Monsef Zerka 77', 79'	Details

9 June 2013 First round	Tampines Rovers	2 - 1	Tanjong Pagar United	Clementi Stadium, Singapore
19:30 (UTC+8)	Aleksandar Đurić 9', 32'	Details	Ismaël Benhamed 90+5'

12 June 2013 First round	Tampines Rovers	2 - 3	(Singapore) Young Lions FC	Clementi Stadium, Singapore
19:30 (UTC+8)	Ahmed Fahmie 23'; Jamil Ali 44'	Details	Afiq Yunos 62'; Ignatius Ang 79'; Sahil Suhaimi 90+3'

=== Group C ===
Pos	Team	Pld	W	D	L	GF	GA	GD	Pts
1	Geylang International (A)	2	1	1	0	2	1	+1	4
2	(Japan) Albirex Niigata (S) (A)	2	0	2	0	0	0	0	2
3	Hougang United	2	0	1	1	1	2	−1	1

Updated to match(es) played on 11 June 2013. Source: sleague.com
Rules for classification: 1) points; 2) goal difference; 3) number of goals scored.
(A) Advance to a further round

==== Matches ====
5 June 2013 First round	Hougang United	0 - 0	(Japan) Albirex Niigata (S)	Hougang Stadium, Singapore
19:30 (UTC+8)		Details		Referee: Jansen Foo

8 June 2013 First round	Albirex Niigata (S) (Japan)	0 - 0	Geylang International	Jurong East Stadium, Singapore
19:30 (UTC+8)		Details		Referee: W Ravisanthiran

11 June 2013 First round	Geylang International	2 - 1	Hougang United	Bedok Stadium, Singapore
19:30 (UTC+8)	Jozef Kaplán 43', 77' (pen.)	Details	Jerome Baker 59'

=== Group D ===
Pos	Team	Pld	W	D	L	GF	GA	GD	Pts
1	Balestier Khalsa (A)	2	1	1	0	4	3	+1	4
2	(Brunei) DPMM FC (A)	2	1	0	1	3	3	0	3
3	Warriors FC	2	0	1	1	3	4	−1	1

Updated to match(es) played on 9 June 2013. Source: sleague.com
Rules for classification: 1) points; 2) goal difference; 3) number of goals scored.
(A) Advance to a further round

==== Matches ====
6 June 2013 First round	Balestier Khalsa	2 - 1	(Brunei) DPMM FC	Toa Payoh Stadium, Singapore
19:30 (UTC+8)	Paul Cunningham 80'; Obadin Aikhena 89'	Details	45' Shahrazen Said

9 June 2013 First round	DPMM FC (Brunei)	2 - 1	Warriors FC	Jalan Besar Stadium, Singapore
19:30 (UTC+8)	Shahrulrizal Abd Rahman 21'; Shahrazen Said 54'	Details	Mislav Karoglan 16'

12 June 2013 First round	Warriors FC	2 - 2	Balestier Khalsa	Choa Chu Kang Stadium, Singapore
19:30 (UTC+8)	Mislav Karoglan 8'; Tatsuro Inui 77'	Details	Kim Min-Ho 19'; Park Kang-Jin 41'

== Knockout stage ==
Quarterfinals
A1	Home United	1(7)
C2	(Japan) Albirex Niigata (S)	1(8)
D1	Balestier Khalsa	3(4)
B2	Tampines Rovers	3(3)
A2	Woodlands Wellington	0(4)
C1	Geylang International	0(1)
B1	Tanjong Pagar United	2
D2	(Brunei) DPMM FC	5

Semifinals
QF1	(Japan) Albirex Niigata (S)	0
QF2	Balestier Khalsa	1
QF3	Woodlands Wellington	0
QF4	(Brunei) DPMM FC	1

Final
SF1	Balestier Khalsa	4
SF2	DPMM FC	0

=== Quarter-finals ===
15 June 2013 Quarter-finals 1	Home United	1 - 1 (a.e.t.) (6 - 7 p)	(Japan) Albirex Niigata (S)	Bishan Stadium
19:30 (UTC+8)	Ismail Yunos 14'	Details	Shingo Suzuki 78' (pen.)	Referee: Ahmad A'Qashah

15 June 2013 Quarter-finals 2	Balestier Khalsa	3 - 3 (a.e.t.) (4 - 3 p)	Tampines Rovers	Toa Payoh Stadium
19:30 (UTC+8)	Ismadi Mukhtar 2' (o.g.); Kim Min-Ho 39'; Zulkiffli Hassim 81'	Details	Aleksandar Đurić 8'; Khairul Amri 67'; Jamil Ali 77'	Referee: Abdul Malik

16 June 2013 Quarter-finals 3	Geylang International	0 - 0 (a.e.t.) (1 – 4 p)	Woodlands Wellington	Bedok Stadium
19:30 (UTC+8)		Details		Referee: Yazeen Buhari
	Penalties
	Norihiro Kawakami (penalty missed); Jozef Kaplán (penalty missed); Shotaro Ihata (penalty scored)		(penalty scored) Moon Soon-Ho; (penalty scored) Rosman Sulaiman; (penalty scored) Cho Sung-hwan; (penalty scored) Goh Swee Swee

16 June 2013 Quarter-finals 4	Tanjong Pagar United	2 - 5	(Brunei) DPMM FC	Queenstown Stadium
19:30 (UTC+8)	Hafiz Nor 4'; Monsef Zerka 28'	Details	47', 64', 71' (pen) João Moreira; 55', 68' Arturas Rimkevicius	Referee: Muhd Taqi

=== Semi-finals ===
9 September 2013 Semi-finals 1	Albirex Niigata (S) (Japan)	0 - 1	Balestier Khalsa	Jurong East Stadium
19:30 (UTC+8)		Details	Park Kang-Jin 12'	Referee: Sukhbir Singh

10 September 2013 Semi-finals 2	Woodlands Wellington	0 - 1	(Brunei) DPMM FC	Woodlands Stadium
19:30 (UTC+8)		Details	Hendra Azam 50'	Referee: Muhd Taqi

== Final ==
14 September 2013 Final	Balestier Khalsa	4 - 0	(Brunei) DPMM FC	Jalan Besar Stadium
19:45	Paul Cunningham 15'; Kim Min-Ho 34'; Poh Yi Feng 68'; Tengku Mushadad 86'	Details		Referee: Leow Thiam Hoe

== Plate Competition ==
Like the 2012 edition of the League Cup, the second runners-up from each group will face each other in the semi-finals of the League Cup Plate Competition.

The winners will go on to meet each other in the League Cup Plate Finals.

== Plate Knockout Stage ==
Semifinals
A3	(Malaysia) Harimau Muda B	1(5)
C3	Hougang United	1(4)
B3	(Singapore) Young Lions FC	3
D3	Warriors FC	2

Final
PSF1	(Malaysia) Harimau Muda B	2
PSF2	(Singapore) Young Lions FC	0

== Plate Semi-finals ==
17 June 2013 Semi-finals 1	Harimau Muda B (Malaysia)	1 - 1 (a.e.t.) (5 - 4 p)	(Singapore) Hougang United	Jalan Besar Stadium
19:30 (UTC+8)	Ridzuan Abdunloh 70'	Details	55' Nurhilmi Jasni	Referee: W Ravisanthiran

18 June 2013 Semi-finals 1	Young Lions FC (Singapore)	3 - 2	Warriors FC	Jalan Besar Stadium
19:30 (UTC+8)	(og) Syaiful Iskandar 22'; Afiq Yunos 45'; Iqbal Hussain 76'	Details	11', 56' Shi Jiayi (pen)	Referee: K Kalimuthu

== Plate final ==
14 September 2013 Final	Harimau Muda B (Malaysia)	2 - 0	(Singapore) Courts Young Lions	Jalan Besar Stadium
17:00	Syazwan Tajudin 22'; Asri Mardzuki 70'	Details		Referee: Ahmad A'Qashah

== Cup Statistics ==
=== Top goalscorers ===
As of 18 June 2013.

Rank	Nationality	Player	Club	Goals
1	(Portugal)	João Moreira	(Brunei) DPMM FC	3
1	(Singapore)	Aliff Shafaein	Home United	3
1	(Singapore)	Aleksandar Đurić	Tampines Rovers	3
1	(Morocco)	Monsef Zerka	Tanjong Pagar	3
2	(England)	Andrew Hutcheon	Admiralty FC	2
2	(South Korea)	Kim Min-Ho	Balestier Khalsa	2
2	(Lithuania)	Arturas Rimkevicius	(Brunei) DPMM FC	2
2	(Brunei)	Shahrazen Said	(Brunei) DPMM FC	2
2	(Singapore)	Afiq Yunos	(Singapore) Young Lions FC	2
2	(Slovakia)	Jozef Kaplán	Geylang International	2
2	(Singapore)	Ismail Yunos	Home United	2
2	(Singapore)	Masrezwan Masturi	Home United	2
2	(Bosnia and Herzegovina)	Mislav Karoglan	Warriors FC	2
2	(Singapore)	Shi Jiayi	Warriors FC	2
2	(South Korea)	Chang Jo-Yoon	Woodlands Wellington	2
2	(Singapore)	Oswind Suriya	Woodlands Wellington	2

== See also ==
- S.League
- Singapore Cup
- Singapore Charity Shield
- Football Association of Singapore
- List of football clubs in Singapore
