= Cho Sung-hwan (footballer, born 1985) =

South Korean footballer

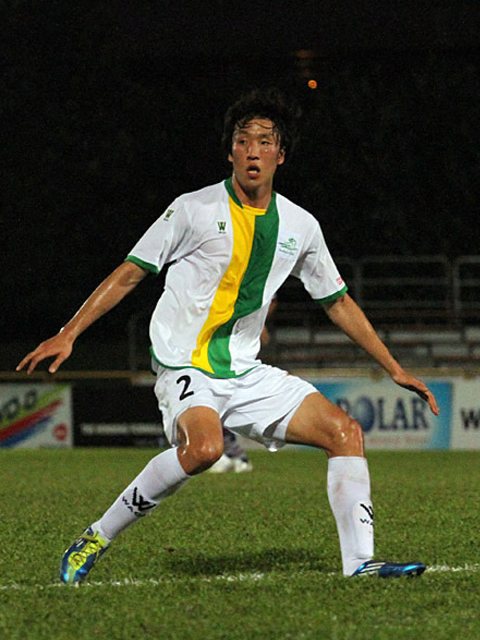
- Cho Sung-hwan turning out for Woodlands Wellington in a S.League match against Warriors F.C. on 21 February 2013.

Personal information
- Date of birth: 25 March 1985 (age 41)
- Place of birth: South Korea
- Height: 1.85 m (6 ft 1 in)
- Position: Defender

Team information
- Current team: Woodlands Wellington
- Number: 2

Youth career
- University of Suwon

Senior career*
Years	Team	Apps	(Gls)
2009–2010	Ansan Hallelujah	13	(2)
2011–2012	FC Pocheon		
2013–	Woodlands Wellington	17	(0)

International career^{‡}
2006	South Korea futsal		
- * Club domestic league appearances and goals as of 16 July 2013 ‡ National team caps and goals as of 30 January 2013

- Cho Sung-hwan
- Hangul: 조성환
- RR: Jo Seonghwan
- MR: Cho Sŏnghwan

Cho Sung-hwan (Korean: 조성환; born 25 March 1985) is a South Korean footballer who plays for Woodlands Wellington in the S.League.

== Club career ==
A graduate of the University of Suwon, Cho began his professional career with Korea National League side Ansan Hallelujah in 2009. He would eventually spend two seasons with the Eagles before transferring to Challengers League side FC Pocheon, winning a champions medal with them in 2012.

Cho travelled to Singapore after the 2012 Challengers League concluded and went on trial with S.League side, Woodlands Wellington.

After impressing the coaching panel in Woodlands' pre-season friendlies against Albirex Niigata (S), Home United and Tampines Rovers, the Rams announced that Cho had been confirmed as the fifth foreigner for the 2013 season alongside Moon Soon-Ho, Atsushi Shimono, Jang Jo-Yoon and Khalid Hamdaoui.

He made his debut for Woodlands Wellington on 21 February 2013 in a 2–2 draw against Warriors F.C.

== Club career statistics ==
As of 16 July 2013

Club Performance		League		Cup		League Cup		Total				
Singapore		S.League		Singapore Cup		League Cup		Total				
Club	Season	Apps	Goals	Apps	Goals	Apps	Goals	Yellow card	(yellow card) (yellow-red card)	Red card	Apps	Goals
Woodlands Wellington	2013	17	0	1	0	3	0	3	0	0	21	0

All numbers encased in brackets signify substitute appearances.
