= 2013 Woodlands Wellington FC season =

Woodlands Wellington
2013 season
- Chairman: (Singapore) Hussainar K. Abdul Aziz
- Coach: (Singapore) Salim Moin (head coach) (Singapore) Clement Teo (assistant coach)
- S.League: 5th (Week 17)
- RHB Singapore Cup: First round
- Top goalscorer: League: (South Korea) Moon Soon-ho (10); All: (South Korea) Moon Soon-ho (10)
- Highest home attendance: 3,108 vs Hougang United (15 Mar 2013)
| Home colours | Away colours | Third colours |

The 2013 S.League season was Woodlands Wellington's 18th competitive and consecutive season in the top flight of Singapore football and 26th year in existence as a football club.

== Key dates ==
- 19 November 2012: Woodlands Wellington FC announced that it had signed veteran custodian Yazid Yasin. The goalkeeper had previously played for the Rams between 2004 and 2008 before joining Geylang United during the 2009 S.League season. Yazid already had 124 appearances for Woodlands under his belt, making him the player with the fourth-most number of appearances for the Rams behind Sazali Salleh, Goh Tat Chuan and Laakkad Abdelhadi.
- 22 November 2012: A report by The New Paper suggested that Woodlands may have fallen into financial hardship and could be the second club to sit out the 2013 S.League after Gombak United has announced earlier that it would not be taking part in the league in 2013. This sparked off a supporter-driven "Save Woodlands" awareness campaign on the same day. The club held an open meeting with the supporters and press at Woodlands Stadium later that evening and quashed the report, stating that Woodlands was financially in the pink of health. Team manager, Matthew Michael Tay, also said that the club was already preparing a pre-season tour of Malaysia, and that the club would be beefing up its squad with five foreigners and it would also be aiming for a minimum 8th spot in the table this season.
- 23 November 2012: The club released a list of six senior players which were retained from 2012, as well as 7 players from the Prime League.
- 7 December 2012: On 7 December 2012, Woodlands Wellington completed the transfer of Albirex Niigata (S) midfielder, Atsushi Shimono.
- 26 December 2012: Woodlands Wellington took part in a four team pre-season tournament which also involved Malaysia Super League sides Darul Takzim FC and Pahang FA, as well as Malaysia Premier League side Johor United. The Rams lost 1–5 to Darul Takzim FC in the opening match on 26 December with Korean trialist Jang Jo-yoon scoring the only goal for Woodlands in the 50th minute.
- 28 December 2012: Following Johor United's 3–0 victory over Pahang FA on 27 December 2012, Woodlands faced the Tok Gajahs in the 3rd place playoff in which they fielded a side made up of mainly trialists and Prime League players, resulting in a 6–0 loss to Pahang.
- 31 December 2012: The club announced that it will play four pre-season friendly matches in January 2013 against SAFFC, Tampines Rovers, Albirex Niigata (S) and Home United respectively.
- 1 January 2013: Shahril Alias and Ang Zhiwei's transfers from Geylang United were officially announced by Woodlands Wellington. They are the second and third Eagles to join the Rams after custodian Yazid Yasin's transfer was confirmed earlier. Woodlands also announced the transfer of former Singapore Under-23 international, Hidhir Hasbiallah. The defender returned to the S.League after a two-year absence due to his national service conscription.
- 2 January 2013: Woodlands Wellington announces the transfer of Fadhil Noh, who returns to the S.League after playing for Home United in the Prime League due to national service.
- 8 January 2013: Taufiq Rahmat becomes the seventh new player to sign for Woodlands Wellington after it announced that the former LionsXII player had put pen to paper for the Rams, marking his return to the S.League after featuring prominently for Tanjong Pagar United in 2011.
- 11 January 2013: Former Super Reds and Gombak United striker, Jang Jo-yoon, is confirmed as the third foreigner for the 2013 season.
- 12 January 2013: Woodlands Wellington announced that they have signed up experienced campaigner Rosman Sulaiman. The former Singapore international was released by Home United at the end of the 2012 season and had been training with the Rams since the start of January.
- 14 January 2013: Former Dutch international, Khalid Hamdaoui is confirmed as the club's fourth foreign signing. Apart from playing for several teams in the Eredivisie, the Dutchman also played for Tokyo Verdy 1969, Dundee F.C. and Raja Casablanca before heading to the S.League.
- 15 January 2013: On 15 January 2013, a new logo (as seen below) of Woodlands Wellington, consisting of a Ram's head encased within a shield, surfaced on the Woodlands Wellington official website and Facebook page. The logo's poor design and seemingly similar appearance to another logo belonging to an American elementary school drew much flak from cyberspace. The logo was subsequently removed from both media platforms and The New Paper ran a feature on the logo change itself on 20 January 2013. In the article, Woodlands chairman, Hussainar K. Abdul Aziz was quoted as saying that the club was looking to change the logo to signify a new beginning, but that (particular) logo had not been approved by the club's management, and that the club was investigating how it made its way onto the website. He also revealed that there are three other fan-designed logos that the Rams were considering as their new crest.
- 24 January 2013: Woodlands Wellington announced that it will be outfitted by Singaporean sports apparel maker Waga for the 2013 S.League season. Woodlands team manager, Matthew Michael Tay, also believed that long time Rams' fans would be pleasantly surprised by the club's choice of colours for the upcoming season, stating that the yellow and green stripes down the middle for the new home kit bore a striking resemblance to the early home kit which the Rams wore between 1996 and 1997.
- 30 January 2013: After impressing the coaching panel in Woodlands' pre-season friendlies against Albirex Niigata (S), Home United and Tampines Rovers, the Rams announced the signing of Korean defender Cho Sung-hwan, its fifth and final foreigner for the 2013 season. Cho joins the Rams from Korean Division 3 side FC Pocheon.
- 2 February 2013: Woodlands Wellington held its press conference at Woodlands Galaxy Community Club, where it unveiled its new club advisor, Ms. Ellen Lee Geck Hoon. The public also caught a glimpse of Woodlands' new Ram mascot, as well as the home kit for the 2013 season. In addition to that, Salim Moin also unveiled his new 20 man squad to the media, with the inclusion of his new signing, Shariff Abdul Samat. Midfielder Armanizam Dolah was also named as the team captain for the new season.
- 21 February 2013: Woodlands Wellington kicks off the 2013 S.League season with a 2–2 draw against Warriors F.C. Khalid Hamdaoui caps off his impressive debut with an assist for Moon Soon-ho to tap home the opening goal and scores Woodlands Wellington's second goal off Jang Jo-yoon's free kick.
- 5 March 2013: Woodlands Wellington beat Home United with a 2–0 scoreline at Bishan Stadium for their first win of the 2013 S.League season. The victory also marked a few milestones in the club's history, with the Rams winning at Bishan for the first time since 1997, while Goh Swee Swee earned his first captaincy in his senior career. Khalid Hamdaoui also scored his third goal in as many games to continue his fine scoring streak.
- 15 March 2013: Woodlands Wellington's 'live' game against Hougang United saw a record local turnout of 3,108.
- 26 March 2013: The Rams beat Albirex Niigata (S) with a 2–1 scoreline at Woodlands Stadium, ending the White Swans' unbeaten five match run since the start of the 2013 S.League. The match also saw Khalid Hamdaoui notch his fourth goal in five appearances.
- 14 April 2013: Woodlands Wellington was drawn to play Geylang International in the Singapore Cup preliminary round during the Cup drawn held at The Float at Marina Bay. The Football Association of Singapore announced on 30 April 2013 that the two sides will play their match on 29 May 2013.
- 12 May 2013: Woodlands Wellington was drawn into Group A of the Starhub League Cup alongside Harimau Muda B, Home United and preliminary playoff winners, newly promoted Division One side Admiralty FC. The grouping is significant for the Rams as apart from being a local derby, Admiralty also boasts three former S.League players who turned out for Woodlands in 2012, namely playoff top scorer Guntur Djafril, K Sathiaraj and Shamsurin Abdul Rahman.
- 18 May 2013: Woodlands Wellington ends up in 9th spot, their lowest since the start of the season, after their defeat to Harimau Muda B at Pasir Gudang Stadium in Week 13.
- 29 May 2013: Woodlands Wellington was knocked out of the RHB Singapore Cup following a 1–4 loss to Geylang International in the preliminary round.
- 11 June 2013: Woodlands Wellington progressed to the knock-out stage of the League Cup after finishing as runners-up in Group A.
- 16 June 2013: Woodlands Wellington qualified for the semifinals of the League Cup after beating Geylang International 4–1 on penalties in the quarterfinals.

== Transfers ==
=== In ===
==== Pre-season ====
| Position | Player | Transferred from | Date | Source |
|---|---|---|---|---|
| GK | (Singapore) Yazid Yasin | (Singapore) Geylang United | 19 November 2012 | |
| MF | (Japan) Atsushi Shimono | (Singapore) Albirex Niigata (S) | 7 December 2012 | |
| DF | (Singapore) Shahril Alias | (Singapore) Geylang United | 1 January 2013 | |
| MF | (Singapore) Ang Zhiwei | (Singapore) Geylang United | 1 January 2013 | |
| DF | (Singapore) Hidhir Hasbiallah | (Singapore) Police Sports Association | 1 January 2013 | |
| FW | (Singapore) Fadhil Noh | (Singapore) Home United | 2 January 2013 | |
| MF | (Singapore) Taufiq Rahmat | (Singapore) LionsXII | 8 January 2013 | |
| FW | (South Korea) Jang Jo-yoon | Free Transfer | 11 January 2013 | |
| DF | (Singapore) Rosman Sulaiman | (Singapore) Home United | 12 January 2013 | |
| MF | (Netherlands) Khalid Hamdaoui | Free transfer | 14 January 2013 | |
| MF | (Singapore) Ridhwan Osman | (Singapore) Hougang United | 16 January 2013 | |
| DF | (South Korea) Cho Sung-hwan | (South Korea) FC Pocheon | 30 January 2013 | |
| MF | (Singapore) Farouq Farkhan | (Singapore) Gombak United | 31 January 2013 | |
| DF | (Singapore) Shariff Abdul Samat | Free Transfer | 2 February 2013 | |

==== Mid-season ====
| Position | Player | Transferred from | Date | Source |
|---|---|---|---|---|
| GK | (Singapore) Nazri Sabri | Free Transfer | 5 June 2013 | |
| MF | (Thailand) Theerawekin Seehawong | (Thailand) Pattaya United F.C. | 17 June 2013 | |

=== Out ===
==== Pre-season ====
| Position | Player | Transferred to | Date | Source |
|---|---|---|---|---|
| GK | (Singapore) Ang Bang Heng | Retirement | 5 November 2012 | |
| DF | (Singapore) Danny Chew Ji Xiang | Released | 23 November 2012 | |
| DF | (Singapore) Duncan David Elias | Released | 23 November 2012 | |
| DF | (Trinidad and Tobago) Fabien Lewis | Released | 23 November 2012 | |
| DF | (England) Daniel Hammond | Released | 23 November 2012 | |
| DF | (Singapore) K. Sathiaraj | Released | 23 November 2012 | |
| MF | (Singapore) Guntur Djafril | Released | 23 November 2012 | |
| MF | (Singapore) Han Yiguang | Released | 23 November 2012 | |
| MF | (Singapore) Shamsurin Abdul Rahman | Released | 23 November 2012 | |
| MF | (Lebanon) Hussein Akil | Released | 23 November 2012 | |
| FW | (Singapore) Navin Neil Vanu | Released | 23 November 2012 | |

==== Mid-season ====
| Position | Player | Transferred from | Date | Source |
|---|---|---|---|---|
| MF | (Netherlands) Khalid Hamdaoui | Released | 14 June 2013 | |

== Squads ==
=== First team squad ===
| No. | Name | Nationality | Position(s) | Date of birth (age) | Signed from (Year signed) |
Goalkeepers
| – | Ahmadulhaq Che Omar | (Singapore) | GK | 11 February 1981 (age 45) | (Singapore) Balestier Khalsa (2012) |
| 1 | Nazri Sabri | (Singapore) | GK | 20 September 1989 (age 37) | Free Transfer (2013 Mid-Season) |
| 18 | Yazid Yasin | (Singapore) | GK | 24 June 1979 (age 47) | (Singapore) Geylang United (2013) |
Defenders
| 2 | Cho Sung-hwan | (South Korea) | DF | 25 March 1985 (age 41) | (South Korea) FC Pocheon (2013) |
| 3 | Hidhir Hasbiallah | (Singapore) | DF | 25 March 1989 (age 37) | (Singapore) Police Sports Association (2013) |
| 4 | Shahril Alias | (Singapore) | DF | 14 May 1984 (age 42) | (Singapore) Geylang United (2013) |
| 13 | Shariff Abdul Samat | (Singapore) | DF | 5 January 1984 (age 42) | Free Transfer (2013) |
| 14 | Rosman Sulaiman | (Singapore) | DF | 6 November 1982 (age 44) | (Singapore) Home United (2013) |
Midfielders
| 5 | Theerawekin Seehawong | (Thailand) | MF | 6 April 1980 (age 46) | (Thailand) Pattaya United F.C. (2013 Mid-Season) |
| 6 | Atsushi Shimono | (Japan) | DMC / MC | 27 April 1988 (age 38) | (Japan) Albirex Niigata (S) (2013) |
| 8 | Armanizam Dolah (Captain) | (Singapore) | MC | 26 November 1987 (age 38) | (Singapore) Balestier Khalsa (2012) |
| 11 | Taufiq Rahmat | (Singapore) | WR / MF | 18 October 1987 (age 39) | (Singapore) LionsXII (2013) |
| 12 | Oswind Suriya Rosayro | (Singapore) | AM L/R/C | 26 November 1989 (age 36) | Free Transfer (2011) |
| 16 | Farouq Farkhan | (Singapore) | WR / MF | 6 June 1988 (age 38) | (Singapore) Gombak United (2013) |
| 19 | Ridhwan Osman | (Singapore) | MF / ST | 27 December 1987 (age 38) | (Singapore) Hougang United (2013) |
| 20 | Ang Zhiwei | (Singapore) | WR / MF | 2 August 1989 (age 37) | (Singapore) Geylang United (2013) |
Forwards
| 7 | Jang Jo-yoon | (South Korea) | FW | 1 January 1988 (age 38) | Free Transfer (2013) |
| 9 | Goh Swee Swee | (Singapore) | WR / ST | 2 June 1986 (age 40) | (Singapore) Balestier Khalsa (2011) |
| 10 | Moon Soon-ho | (South Korea) | FW | 15 March 1981 (age 45) | (South Korea) Cheonan City FC (2011) |
| 15 | Fadhil Noh | (Singapore) | FW | 4 March 1989 (age 37) | (Singapore) Home United (2013) |
| 17 | Farizal Basri | (Singapore) | FW / SS | 15 March 1981 (age 45) | (Singapore) Home United (2012) |

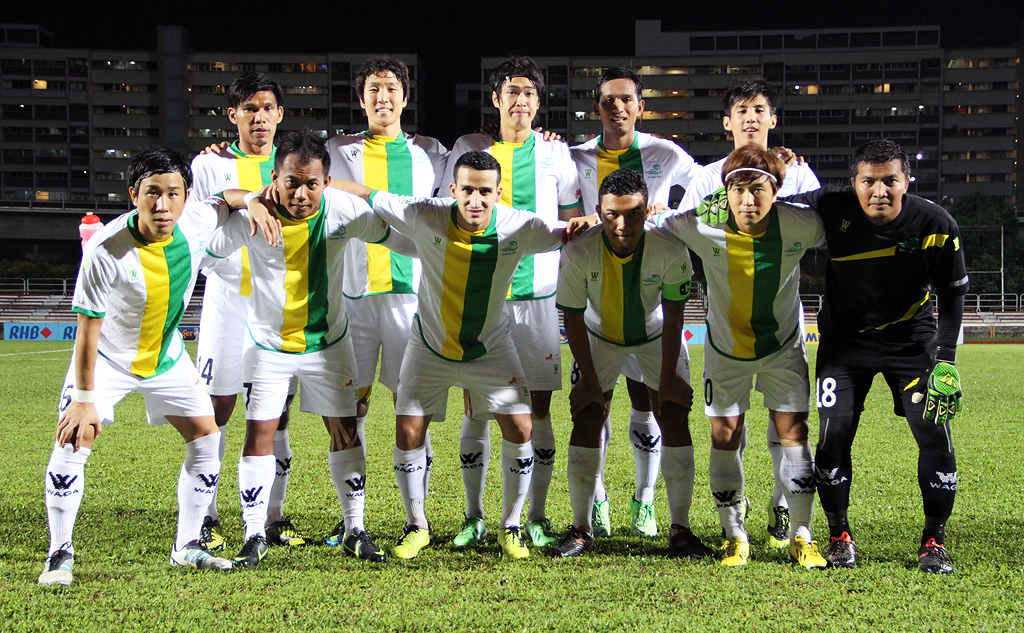
Woodlands Wellington's starting lineup against Balestier Khalsa on 2 May 2013, pictured here in their white home strip. Back (from left): Rosman Sulaiman, Cho Sung-hwan, Jang Jo-yoon, Shahril Alias, Ang Zhiwei Front (from left): Atsushi Shimono, Farizal Basri, Khalid Hamdaoui, Armanizam Dolah (C), Moon Soon-ho, Yazid Yasin

== Club ==
=== Coaching staff ===
| Position | Name |
|---|---|
| Team Manager | (Singapore) Matthew Michael Tay |
| Head Coach | (Singapore) Salim Moin |
| Assistant / Prime League Coach | (Singapore) Clement Teo |
| Goalkeeping Coach | (Singapore) Matthew Michael Tay |
| Centre of Excellence Head Coach | (Singapore) Mohd Sani Kadim |

Last updated: 7 February 2013
Source: http://www.sleague.com/clubs-profile/woodlands/club-profile

=== Boardroom staff ===
| Position | Name |
|---|---|
| Club Advisor | (Singapore) Ellen Lee Geck Hoon |
| Chairman | (Singapore) Hussainar K. Abdul Aziz |
| Vice-Chairman | (Singapore) Winson Song Ying Kong |
| Honorary Treasurer | (Singapore) Keith Tee Tan |
| Club Manager | (Singapore) Eric Loh |
| Operations Manager | (Singapore) Steven Li |
| Accounts Executive | (Singapore) Frances Chow |

Last updated: 7 February 2013
Source: http://www.sleague.com/clubs-profile/woodlands/club-profile

== Pre-season and friendlies ==
=== Johor Crown Prince Invitational Quadrangular ===
| 26 December 2012 Semi-final | Darul Takzim FC (Malaysia) | 5–1 | (Singapore) Woodlands Wellington | Larkin Stadium |
| 20:30 GMT+8 | Daniel Güiza 9'; Safee Sali 38'; Safee Sali 46'; Mohd Safiq Rahim 82'; Norshahrul Idlan Talaha 88' | Report | 50' Jang Jo-yoon |

| 28 December 2012 3rd / 4th Placing | Pahang FA (Malaysia) | 6–0 | (Singapore) Woodlands Wellington | Seri Gelam |
| 16:45 GMT+8 | Mohd Amirul Hadi Zainal; Mohd Fauzi Roslan; Mohamed Borji; Mohamed Borji; Abdul Malik Mat Ariff; Mohamed Borji | Report |

Semifinals
1 | (Malaysia) Darul Takzim FC | 5
4 | (Singapore) Woodlands Wellington | 1
3 | (Malaysia) Johor United | 3
2 | (Malaysia) Pahang FA | 0

Finals
(Malaysia) Darul Takzim FC | 1
(Malaysia) Johor United | 2
Third place
(Malaysia) Pahang FA | 6
(Singapore) Woodlands Wellington | 0

=== Friendlies ===
| 27 December 2012 | Johor State Police (Malaysia) | 0–2 | (Singapore) Woodlands Wellington | Seri Gelam Pitch |
| | | | Andy Ahmad; Yus Henzry |

| 9 January 2013 | Warriors F.C. (Singapore) | 2–1 | (Singapore) Woodlands Wellington | Jalan Besar Stadium |
| 17:00 GMT+8 | Shimpei Sakurada 19'; Mislav Karoglan 61' | Report | 42' Moon Soon-ho |

| 18 January 2013 | Woodlands Wellington (Singapore) | 0–0 | (Japan) Albirex Niigata (S) | Woodlands Stadium |
| 17:00 GMT+8 | | Report |

| 22 January 2013 | Woodlands Wellington (Singapore) | 1–0 | (Singapore) Home United | Woodlands Stadium |
| 17:00 GMT+8 | Moon Soon-ho 79' | Report |

| 26 January 2013 | Woodlands Wellington (Singapore) | 0–2 | (Singapore) Tampines Rovers | Woodlands Stadium |
| 17:00 GMT+8 | | Report | 7' Shahdan Sulaiman; 44' Seiji Kaneko |

| 29 January 2013 | Woodlands Wellington (Singapore) | 3–0 | (Singapore) Balestier Khalsa | Woodlands Stadium |
| 19:00 GMT+8 | Jang Jo-yoon 14'; Moon Soon-ho 49' (pen) Goh Swee Swee 81' | Report |

| 5 February 2013 | Woodlands Wellington (Singapore) | 0–3 | (Singapore) SCC Firsts | Woodlands Stadium |
| 19:30 GMT+8 | | Report | 14' Anthony Moulin; 21' James Kilbee; 80' Andrew Hutcheon |

| 19 March 2013 | LionsXII (Singapore) | 2–1 | (Singapore) Woodlands Wellington | Jalan Besar Stadium |
| 19:00 GMT+8 | Nazrul Nazari 81'; Gabriel Quak 90' | Report | 15' Moon Soon-ho |

| 23 July 2013 | Woodlands Wellington (Singapore) | 4–4 | (Malaysia) Johor FA | Woodlands Stadium |
| 20:15 GMT+8 | Jang Jo-yoon 23', 33'; Moon Soon-ho 25'; Own goal 35' |

== S.League fixtures and results ==
=== League table ===
| Pos | Team | Pld | W | D | L | GF | GA | GD | Pts |
|---|---|---|---|---|---|---|---|---|---|
| 3 | (Japan) Albirex Niigata (S) (Note: The three foreign clubs – Albirex Niigata (S), DPMM FC and Harimau Muda B – as well as the Football Association of Singapore (FAS) under-23 team, Young Lions, are not eligible for any AFC competition spots.) | 27 | 13 | 7 | 7 | 36 | 28 | +8 | 46 |
| 4 | Balestier Khalsa | 27 | 12 | 7 | 8 | 38 | 28 | +10 | 43 |
| 5 | Woodlands Wellington | 27 | 10 | 7 | 10 | 45 | 47 | −2 | 37 |
| 6 | Tanjong Pagar United | 27 | 9 | 9 | 9 | 36 | 34 | +2 | 36 |
| 7 | Warriors FC | 27 | 9 | 8 | 10 | 38 | 38 | 0 | 35 |

Source: RSSSF
Rules for classification: 1) points; 2) goal difference; 3) number of goals scored

=== S.League results summary ===
| Overall | | | | | | | | Home | | | | | | Away | | | | | |
| Pld | W | D | L | GF | GA | GD | Pts | W | D | L | GF | GA | GD | W | D | L | GF | GA | GD |
|---|---|---|---|---|---|---|---|---|---|---|---|---|---|---|---|---|---|---|---|
| 18 | 8 | 5 | 5 | 28 | 22 | +6 | 29 | 4 | 3 | 2 | 18 | 13 | +5 | 4 | 2 | 3 | 10 | 9 | +1 |

Last updated: 16 July 2013.

=== S.League results by round ===
| Round | 1 | 2 | 3 | 4 | 5 | 6 | 7 | 8 | 9 | 10 | 11 | 12 | 13 | 14 | 15 | 16 | 17 | 18 | 19 | 20 | 21 | 22 |
|---|---|---|---|---|---|---|---|---|---|---|---|---|---|---|---|---|---|---|---|---|---|---|
| Ground | H | H | A | H | H | A | A | A | H | A | H | H | A | A | A | H | A | H | H | A | H | A |
| Result | D | L | W | D | W | L | W | D | D | L | W | L | L | D | W | W | W | W | | | | |
| Position | 6 | 8 | 5 | 7 | 5 | 6 | 5 | 5 | 6 | 6 | 5 | 6 | 9 | 8 | 6 | 6 | 5 | | | | | |

Updated to match(es) played on 16 July 2013. Source: Matches and sleague.com
A = Away; H = Home; W = Win; D = Draw; L = Loss

=== Round 1 ===
| 21 February 2013 1 | Woodlands Wellington (Singapore) | 2–2 | (Singapore) Warriors F.C. | Woodlands Stadium, Singapore |
| 19:30 GMT+8 | Moon Soon-ho 28'; Jang Jo-yoon (yellow card) 38'; Rosman Sulaiman (yellow card) 41'; Khalid Hamdaoui 72'; Ang Zhiwei (yellow card) 83'; Taufiq Rahmat (yellow card) 86' | Details; Report | (yellow card) 63' Abdil Qaiyyim; 68' Sufian Anuar; (yellow card) 73' Marin Vidosevic; 84' Shimpei Sakurada | Attendance: 1,723; Referee: Muhd Farhad |

| 26 February 2013 2 | Woodlands Wellington (Singapore) | 1–2 | (Malaysia) Harimau Muda B | Woodlands Stadium, Singapore |
| 19:30 GMT+8 | Khalid Hamdaoui (yellow card) 42'; Shahril Alias (yellow card) 47'; Shahril Alias (yellow card) 71' (red card); Khalid Hamdaoui 75'; Ang Zhiwei (yellow card) 87' | Details; Report | 9' Maxsius Musa; (yellow card) 43' Azzizan Nordin; (yellow card) 69' Ridzuan Abdunloh; 83' Mohd Yazid Zaini; (yellow card) 84' Wan Ahmad Amirzafran | Referee: Leow Thiam Hoe |

| 5 March 2013 3 | Home United (Singapore) | 0–2 | (Singapore) Woodlands Wellington | Bishan Stadium, Singapore |
| 19:30 GMT+8 | Nor Azli Yusoff (yellow card) 52'; Noh Rahman (yellow card) 82'; Indra Sahdan Daud (red card) 91'; Masato Fukui (red card) 94' | Details | (yellow card) 56' Goh Swee Swee; 67' Rosman Sulaiman; 73' Khalid Hamdaoui; (yellow card) 75' Moon Soon-ho; (yellow card) 85' (red card) Moon Soon-ho | Referee: W Ravisanthiran |

| 15 March 2013 4 | Woodlands Wellington (Singapore) | 0–0 | (Singapore) Hougang United | Jalan Besar Stadium, Singapore |
| 19:30 GMT+8 | Khalid Hamdaoui (yellow card) 92' | Details; Report | (yellow card) 56' Faizal Amir; (yellow card) 79' Robert Eziakor; (yellow card) 92' Fadhil Salim | Attendance: 3,108; Referee: Muhd Taqi |

| 26 March 2013 5 | Woodlands Wellington (Singapore) | 2–1 | (Japan) Albirex Niigata (S) | Woodlands Stadium, Singapore |
| 19:30 GMT+8 | Khalid Hamdaoui 21' (yellow card) 44'; Ridhwan Osman (yellow card) 41'; Moon Soon-ho (yellow card) 68'; Jang Jo-yoon 79' | Details | Kento Nagasaki 72'; Kento Fukuda (yellow card) 77' | Referee: Sukhbir Singh |

| 31 March 2013 6 | Brunei DPMM | 1–0 | (Singapore) Woodlands Wellington | Sultan Hassanal Bolkiah Stadium, Bandar Seri Begawan, Brunei |
| 20:15 GMT+8 | Joao Moreira 30' (yellow card) 85'; Dino Drpic (yellow card) 73' | Details; Report | (yellow card) 66' Cho Sung-hwan; (yellow card) 83' Rosman Sulaiman | Referee: Ahmad A'Qashah |

| 5 April 2013 7 | Courts Young Lions (Singapore) | 1–3 | (Singapore) Woodlands Wellington | Jalan Besar Stadium, Singapore |
| 19:30 GMT+8 | Sherif El-Masri 9'; Tajeli Salamat (yellow card) 38'; Sufianto Salleh (yellow card) 50' | Details | (yellow card) 50' Taufiq Rahmat; 59' Moon Soon-ho; (yellow card) 63' Shahril Alias; 82' Sheikh Abdul Hadi (og); 92' Goh Swee Swee | Referee: Irwan Samsuddin |

| 11 April 2013 8 | Tanjong Pagar United (Singapore) | 1–1 | (Singapore) Woodlands Wellington | Queenstown Stadium, Singapore |
| 19:30 GMT+8 | Kamel Ramdani (yellow card) 39'; Walid Lounis (yellow card) 48'; Monsef Zerka 86' | Details | (yellow card) 41' Rosman Sulaiman; 84' Jang Jo-yoon; (yellow card) 87' (red card) Rosman Sulaiman | Referee: Irwan Samsuddin |

| 18 April 2013 9 | Woodlands Wellington (Singapore) | 0–0 | (Singapore) Geylang International | Woodlands Stadium, Singapore |
| 19:30 GMT+8 | Shahril Alias (yellow card) 26'; Ang Zhiwei (yellow card) 58' | Details | (yellow card) 15' Taufiq Ghani; (yellow card) 39' Fabian Kwok | Referee: Leow Thiam Hoe |

| 27 April 2013 10 | Tampines Rovers (Singapore) | 3–1 | (Singapore) Woodlands Wellington | (Singapore) Clementi Stadium |
| 7:30pm (UTC+8) | Imran Sahib 4'; Sead Hadžibulić 46', (yellow card) 67'; Firdaus Kasman (yellow card) 84'; Aleksandar Đurić 88' | Details | (yellow card) 34' Rosman Sulaiman; (red card) 49' Shariff Samat; 90' Farouq Farkhan | Referee: Muhd Taqi |

| 2 May 2013 11 | Woodlands Wellington (Singapore) | 3–1 | (Singapore) Balestier Khalsa | (Singapore) Woodlands Stadium |
| 7:30pm (UTC+8) | Moon Soon-ho 4', 30'; Jang Jo-yoon 74'; Shahril Alias (yellow card) 77' | Details | (yellow card) 49' Park Kang-Jin; (yellow card) 50' Zulkiffli Hassim; (yellow card) 60' Qiu Li; 85' Hidhir Hasbiallah (og) | Referee: W Ravisanthiran |

=== Round 2 ===
| 6 May 2013 12 | Woodlands Wellington (Singapore) | 0–3 | (Singapore) Home United | Woodlands Stadium, Singapore |
| 19:30 GMT+8 | Shahril Alias (yellow card) 14'; Khalid Hamdaoui (red card) 34'; Yazid Yasin (yellow card) 64' | Details | 22' Lee Kwan-Woo; (yellow card) 34' Song Ui-Young; (yellow card) 62' Masrezwan Masturi; 65', 75' Sirina Camara | Referee: Jansen Foo |

| 18 May 2013 13 | Harimau Muda B (Malaysia) | 2–1 | (Singapore) Woodlands Wellington | Pasir Gudang Stadium, Johor Bahru, Malaysia |
| 16:45 GMT+8 | Ridzuan Abdunloh (yellow card) 5', (goal) 13', (yellow card) 74' (red card); Yazid Zaini 29' | Details | (yellow card) 33' Armanizam Dolah; (yellow card) 44' Goh Swee Swee; (yellow card) 54' Farizal Basri; (yellow card) 57' Shariff Samat | Referee: Farhad Mohd |

| 25 May 2013 14 | Warriors F.C. (Singapore) | 1–1 | (Singapore) Woodlands Wellington | Choa Chu Kang Stadium, Singapore |
| 19:30 GMT+8 | Abdil Qaiyyim (yellow card) 75'; Tatsuro Inui 88' | Details | 62' Atsushi Shimono; (yellow card) 77' Taufiq Rahmat; (yellow card) 78' Armanizam Dolah |

| 26 June 2013 15 | Hougang United (Singapore) | 0–1 | (Singapore) Woodlands Wellington | (Singapore) Hougang Stadium |
| 19:30 GMT+8 | Nurhilmi Jasni (yellow card) 85'; Fazli Jaffar (yellow card) 93' | Details | (yellow card) 25' Shariff Samat; (yellow card) 58' Atsushi Shimono; (yellow card) 89' Yazid Yasin; 93' Lau Meng Meng (og) |

| 5 July 2013 16 | Woodlands Wellington (Singapore) | 5–2 | Brunei DPMM | Jalan Besar Stadium, Singapore |
| 19:30 GMT+8 | Theerawekin Seehawong 27', 80'; Jang Jo-yoon 33', 74'; Shahril Alias (yellow card) 42'; Moon Soon-ho 55'; Taufiq Rahmat (yellow card) 66' | Details | 5' João Moreira; 16' Rodrigo Tosi; 43' Rosmin Kamis; 90' Hendra Azam |

| 10 July 2013 17 | Albirex Niigata (S) (Japan) | 0–1 | (Singapore) Woodlands Wellington | Jurong East Stadium, Singapore |
| 19:30 GMT+8 | Bruno Castenheira (yellow card) 70' | Details | (yellow card) 79' Cho Sung-hwan; 84' Moon Soon-ho | Referee: Ahmad A'Qashah |

| 16 July 2013 18 | Woodlands Wellington (Singapore) | 5–2 | (Singapore) Courts Young Lions | Woodlands Stadium, Singapore |
| 19:30 GMT+8 | Moon Soon-ho 7', 70', (pen) 74'; Shahril Alias (yellow card) 65'; Rosman Sulaiman (yellow card) 77'; Jang Jo-yoon 79'; Ridhwan Osman (yellow card) 81'; Ang Zhiwei 93' | Details | (yellow card) 31' Al-Qaasimy Rahman; 58' Sherif El-Masri; (yellow card) 61' Nur Ridho; (yellow card) 74' Syazwan Buhari; (yellow card) 81' Afiq Yunos; 88' Sahil Suhaimi |

| 4 August 2013 19 | Woodlands Wellington (Singapore) | 2–3 | (Singapore) Tanjong Pagar United | Woodlands Stadium, Singapore |
| 19:30 GMT+8 | Jang Jo-yoon 59', 90+2' | | Zerka 3', 37'; Ramdani 30' (yellow card) 83'; Aymard (yellow card) 68' |

| 23 August 2013 20 | Geylang International (Singapore) | 1–2 | (Singapore) Woodlands Wellington | Bedok Stadium, Singapore |
| 19:30 GMT+8 | Wahyudi Wahid (yellow card) 24'; Khayrulhayat Jumat (yellow card) 31'; Kapláň 50'; Ali (red card) 74' | | Jang Jo-yoon 29'; Moon Soon-ho (yellow card) 54'; Seehawong (yellow card) 84'; Abdul Samat (yellow card) 86'; Sulaiman 90' |

| 29 August 2013 21 | Woodlands Wellington (Singapore) | 3–3 | (Singapore) Tampines Rovers | Woodlands Stadium, Singapore |
| 19:30 GMT+8 | Ang Zhiwei (yellow card) 26'; Moon Soon-ho 40'; Jang Jo-yoon 58'; Alias (yellow card) 79'; Samat 82'; Cho Sung-hwan (yellow card) 85' | | Đurić 16'; Mustafić 45+1' (pen.); Ali 66'; Kasman (yellow card) 68'; Sulaiman (yellow card) 86' |

| 19 September 2013 22 | Balestier Khalsa (Singapore) | 1–2 | (Singapore) Woodlands Wellington | Toa Payoh Stadium, Singapore |
| 19:30 GMT+8 | Cunningham (yellow card) 58'; Park Kang-Jin 77' | | Aikhena 22' (pen.); Jang Jo-yoon 85' |

=== RHB Singapore Cup ===
| 29 May 2013 Preliminary round | Woodlands Wellington (Singapore) | 1–4 | (Singapore) Geylang International | Woodlands Stadium, Singapore |
| 19:30 (UTC+8) | Moon Soon-ho 6' | Details | 46', 49', 60' Jozef Kapláň; 66' Yasir Hanapi (pen) | Referee: Farhad Mohd |

== League Cup ==
Woodlands Wellington was drawn into Group A of the League Cup's First round alongside Harimau Muda B, Home United and preliminary playoff winners Admiralty FC.

The Rams progressed to the quarterfinals after they finished as runners-up of Group A. They subsequently qualified for the semifinals after beating Geylang International 4–1 on penalties after the match ended 0–0 and will face Brunei DPMM in the semifinals in September 2013.

=== Group A ===
| Pos | Team | Pld | W | D | L | GF | GA | GD | Pts |
|---|---|---|---|---|---|---|---|---|---|
| 1 | Home United (A) | 3 | 3 | 0 | 0 | 10 | 0 | +10 | 9 |
| 2 | Woodlands Wellington (A) | 3 | 2 | 0 | 1 | 4 | 4 | 0 | 6 |
| 3 | Harimau Muda B | 3 | 1 | 0 | 2 | 2 | 5 | −3 | 3 |
| 4 | Admiralty FC | 3 | 0 | 0 | 3 | 3 | 10 | −7 | 0 |

Updated to match(es) played on 11 June 2013. Source: sleague.com
Rules for classification: 1) points; 2) goal difference; 3) number of goals scored.
(A) Advance to a further round

== Knockout stage ==
Quarterfinals
A1 | Home United | 1(7)
C2 | Albirex Niigata (S) | 1(8)
D1 | Balestier Khalsa | 3(4)
B2 | Tampines Rovers | 3(3)
A2 | Woodlands Wellington | 0(4)
C1 | Geylang International | 0(1)
B1 | Tanjong Pagar United | 2
D2 | Brunei DPMM | 5

Semifinals
QF1 | Albirex Niigata (S)
QF2 | Balestier Khalsa
QF3 | Woodlands Wellington
QF4 | Brunei DPMM

Final
SF1
SF2

=== League Cup fixtures ===
| 5 June 2013 Preliminary round | Woodlands Wellington (Singapore) | 3–2 | (Singapore) Admiralty FC | Woodlands Stadium, Singapore |
| 19:30 (UTC+8) | Fadhil Noh (yellow card) 43'; Cho Sung-hwan (yellow card) 46'; Jang Jo-yoon 50', 85'; Oswind Suriya 82' | Details | 4' Andrew Hutcheon; 37' Mohamad Helmi Mohamad; (yellow card) 89' Maziz Abdul Rahman; (yellow card) 93' Mathew Shiva | Referee: Ahmad A'Qashah |

| 8 June 2013 Preliminary round | Woodlands Wellington (Singapore) | 1–0 | (Malaysia) Harimau Muda B | Woodlands Stadium, Singapore |
| 19:30 (UTC+8) | Oswind Suriya 22'; Moon Soon-ho (yellow card) 30'; Taufiq Rahmat (yellow card) 47', (yellow card) 89' (red card); Fadhil Noh (yellow card) 73' | Details | (yellow card) 66' Akmal Ishak | Referee: Muhd Taqi |

| 11 June 2013 Preliminary round | Home United (Singapore) | 2–0 | (Singapore) Woodlands Wellington | Bishan Stadium, Singapore |
| 19:30 (UTC+8) | Masrezwan Masturi 42', (yellow card) 46'; Aliff Shafaein 53'; Hafiz Rahim (yellow card) 60' | Details | (yellow card) 46' Goh Swee Swee; (yellow card) 64' Armanizam Dolah | Referee: Farhad Mohd |

| 16 June 2013 Quarter-finals | Geylang International (Singapore) | 0–0 (a.e.t.) (1–4 p) | (Singapore) Woodlands Wellington | Bedok Stadium |
| 19:30 (UTC+8) | Norihiro Kawakami (yellow card) 85' | Details | (yellow card) 50', (yellow card) 54' (red card) Shahril Alias | Referee: Yazeen Buhari |
| | Penalties |
| | Norihiro Kawakami (penalty missed); Jozef Kapláň (penalty missed); Shotaro Ihata (penalty scored) | | (penalty scored) Moon Soon-ho; (penalty scored) Rosman Sulaiman; (penalty scored) Cho Sung-hwan; (penalty scored) Goh Swee Swee |

| TBC Semi-finals | Woodlands Wellington (Singapore) | v | Brunei DPMM | Woodlands Stadium |
| 19:30 (UTC+8) |

== First team statistics ==
=== Appearances and goals ===
| No. | Pos | Nat | Player | Total | | S-League | | RHB Singapore Cup | | League Cup | |
| No. | Pos | Nat | Player | Apps | Goals | Apps | Goals | Apps | Goals | Apps | Goals |
|---|---|---|---|---|---|---|---|---|---|---|---|
| - | GK | (Singapore) SGP | Ahmadulhaq Che Omar | 5 | 0 | 4+1 | 0 | 0+0 | 0 | 0+0 | 0 |
| 1 | GK | (Singapore) SGP | Nazri Sabri | 1 | 0 | 0+0 | 0 | 0+0 | 0 | 1+0 | 0 |
| 18 | GK | (Singapore) SGP | Yazid Yasin | 19 | 0 | 14+0 | 0 | 1+0 | 0 | 3+1 | 0 |
| 30 | GK | (Singapore) SGP | Fearghus Bruce | 1 | 0 | 0+1 | 0 | 0+0 | 0 | 0+0 | 0 |
| 2 | DF | (South Korea) KOR | Cho Sung-hwan | 21 | 0 | 17+0 | 0 | 1+0 | 0 | 3+0 | 0 |
| 3 | DF | (Singapore) SGP | Hidhir Hasbiallah | 6 | 0 | 3+2 | 0 | 0+0 | 0 | 1+0 | 0 |
| 4 | DF | (Singapore) SGP | Shahril Alias | 19 | 0 | 14+1 | 0 | 0+0 | 0 | 4+0 | 0 |
| 13 | DF | (Singapore) SGP | Shariff Abdul Samat | 14 | 0 | 11+0 | 0 | 1+0 | 0 | 2+0 | 0 |
| 14 | DF | (Singapore) SGP | Rosman Sulaiman | 19 | 1 | 16+0 | 1 | 1+0 | 0 | 2+0 | 0 |
| 5 | MF | (Netherlands) NED | Khalid Hamdaoui* | 14 | 4 | 12+0 | 4 | 0+1 | 0 | 1+0 | 0 |
| 5 | MF | (Thailand) THA | Theerawekin Seehawong | 3 | 2 | 3+0 | 2 | 0+0 | 0 | 0+0 | 0 |
| 6 | MF | (Japan) JPN | Atsushi Shimono | 22 | 1 | 17+0 | 1 | 1+0 | 0 | 4+0 | 0 |
| 8 | MF | (Singapore) SGP | Armanizam Dolah | 22 | 0 | 12+6 | 0 | 1+0 | 0 | 0+3 | 0 |
| 11 | MF | (Singapore) SGP | Taufiq Rahmat | 17 | 0 | 6+8 | 0 | 1+0 | 0 | 1+1 | 0 |
| 12 | MF | (Singapore) SGP | Oswind Suriya Rosayro | 9 | 2 | 2+4 | 0 | 0+0 | 0 | 3+0 | 2 |
| 16 | MF | (Singapore) SGP | Farouq Farkhan | 3 | 1 | 0+1 | 1 | 0+0 | 0 | 1+1 | 0 |
| 19 | MF | (Singapore) SGP | Ridhwan Osman | 14 | 0 | 4+7 | 0 | 0+0 | 0 | 2+1 | 0 |
| 20 | MF | (Singapore) SGP | Ang Zhiwei | 23 | 1 | 18+0 | 1 | 1+0 | 0 | 4+0 | 0 |
| 7 | FW | (South Korea) KOR | Jang Jo-yoon | 23 | 8 | 17+1 | 6 | 0+1 | 0 | 4+0 | 2 |
| 9 | FW | (Singapore) SGP | Goh Swee Swee | 18 | 1 | 4+9 | 1 | 0+1 | 0 | 1+3 | 0 |
| 10 | FW | (South Korea) KOR | Moon Soon-ho | 22 | 10 | 16+1 | 9 | 1+0 | 1 | 3+1 | 0 |
| 15 | FW | (Singapore) SGP | Fadhil Noh | 15 | 0 | 2+8 | 0 | 1+0 | 0 | 4+0 | 0 |
| 17 | FW | (Singapore) SGP | Farizal Basri | 11 | 0 | 6+2 | 0 | 1+0 | 0 | 1+1 | 0 |

Updated to games played on 16 July 2013
*Released during mid-season transfer window.

=== First team goalscoring statistics ===
Includes all competitive matches. The list is sorted by shirt number when total goals are equal.

| Ran | No. | Pos | Nat | Name | S-League | Singapore Cup | Singapore League Cup | Total |
|---|---|---|---|---|---|---|---|---|
| 1 | 10 | FW | (South Korea) | Moon Soon-ho | 9 | 1 | 0 | 10 |
| 2 | 7 | FW | (South Korea) | Jang Jo-yoon | 6 | 0 | 2 | 8 |
| 3 | 5 | MF | (Netherlands) | Khalid Hamdaoui | 4 | 0 | 0 | 4 |
| 4 | 12 | MF | (Thailand) | Theerawekin Seehawong | 2 | 0 | 0 | 2 |
| 4 | 12 | MF | (Singapore) | Oswind Suriya | 0 | 0 | 2 | 2 |
| 5 | 6 | MF | (Japan) | Atsushi Shimono | 1 | 0 | 0 | 1 |
| 5 | 9 | FW | (Singapore) | Goh Swee Swee | 1 | 0 | 0 | 1 |
| 5 | 14 | DF | (Singapore) | Rosman Sulaiman | 1 | 0 | 0 | 1 |
| 5 | 16 | MF | (Singapore) | Farouq Farkhan | 1 | 0 | 0 | 1 |
| 5 | 20 | MF | (Singapore) | Ang Zhiwei | 1 | 0 | 0 | 1 |
| - | Others* | | | | 2 | 0 | 0 | 2 |
| | | | | TOTALS | 28 | 1 | 4 | 33 |

Updated to games played on 16 July 2013
*Two of Woodlands Wellington's goals was scored via own goals from opposing players – Sheikh Abdul Hadi during the match against Courts Young Lions on 5 April 2012 and Lau Meng Meng during the match against Hougang United on 26 June 2012.

=== First team goal assist statistics ===
Includes all competitive matches. The list is sorted by shirt number when total goals are equal.

| Ran | No. | Pos | Nat | Name | S-League | Singapore Cup | Singapore League Cup | Total |
|---|---|---|---|---|---|---|---|---|
| 1 | 7 | FW | (South Korea) | Jang Jo-yoon | 9 | 0 | 1 | 10 |
| 2 | 10 | FW | (South Korea) | Moon Soon-ho | 7 | 0 | 1 | 8 |
| 3 | 5 | MF | (Netherlands) | Khalid Hamdaoui | 2 | 0 | 1 | 3 |
| 4 | 6 | MF | (Japan) | Atsushi Shimono | 1 | 0 | 0 | 1 |
| 5 | 2 | DF | (South Korea) | Cho Sung-hwan | 0 | 1 | 0 | 1 |
| 5 | 4 | DF | (Singapore) | Shahril Alias | 1 | 0 | 0 | 1 |
| 5 | 5 | MF | (Thailand) | Theerawekin Seehawong | 1 | 0 | 0 | 1 |
| 5 | 8 | MF | (Singapore) | Armanizam Dolah | 1 | 0 | 0 | 1 |
| 5 | 11 | MF | (Singapore) | Taufiq Rahmat | 1 | 0 | 0 | 1 |
| 5 | 12 | MF | (Singapore) | Oswind Suriya | 0 | 0 | 1 | 1 |
| 5 | 17 | MF | (Singapore) | Farizal Basri | 1 | 0 | 0 | 1 |
| 5 | 20 | MF | (Singapore) | Ang Zhiwei | 1 | 0 | 0 | 1 |
| | | | | TOTALS | 26 | 1 | 4 | 31* |

Updated to games played on 16 July 2013
*Two goals were not recorded with assists as they were scored via a direct free kick and a penalty kick respectively.
One of Jang Jo-yoon's assists was deflected by Sheikh Abdul Hadi into his own goal during Woodlands Wellington's match against Courts Young Lions on 5 April 2013.
One of Moon Soon-ho's assists was deflected by Lau Meng Meng into his own goal during Woodlands Wellington's match against Hougang United on 26 June 2013.

=== First team clean sheets ===
Includes all competitive matches. The list is sorted by shirt number when total clean sheets are equal.

| R | No. | Pos | Nat | Name | S-League | RHB Singapore Cup | Starhub League Cup | Total |
|---|---|---|---|---|---|---|---|---|
| 1 | 18 | GK | (Singapore) | Yazid Yasin | 4 | 0 | 2 | 6 |
| 2 | – | GK | (Singapore) | Ahmadulhaq Che Omar | 1 | 0 | 0 | 1 |
| | | | | TOTALS | 3 | 0 | 2 | 5 |

Updated to games played on 16 July 2013

=== First team disciplinary record ===
Includes all competitive matches. The list is sorted by shirt number when total cards are equal.

| R | No. | Pos | Nat | Name | S-League | | | RHB Singapore Cup | | | Starhub League Cup | | | Total | | |
| R | No. | Pos | Nat | Name | Yellow card | (yellow card) (yellow-red card) | Red card | Yellow card | (yellow card) (yellow-red card) | Red card | Yellow card | (yellow card) (yellow-red card) | Red card | Yellow card | (yellow card) (yellow-red card) | Red card |
| 1 | 4 | DF | (Singapore) | Shahril Alias | 7 | 1 | 0 | 0 | 0 | 0 | 1 | 1 | 0 | 8 | 2 | 0 |
| 2 | 11 | MF | (Singapore) | Taufiq Rahmat | 4 | 0 | 0 | 1 | 0 | 0 | 1 | 1 | 0 | 6 | 1 | 0 |
| 3 | 14 | DF | (Singapore) | Rosman Sulaiman | 5 | 1 | 0 | 0 | 0 | 0 | 0 | 0 | 0 | 5 | 1 | 0 |
| 4 | 5 | MF | (Netherlands) | Khalid Hamdaoui | 3 | 0 | 1 | 1 | 0 | 0 | 0 | 0 | 0 | 4 | 0 | 1 |
| 5 | 10 | FW | (South Korea) | Moon Soon-ho | 2 | 1 | 0 | 0 | 0 | 0 | 1 | 0 | 0 | 3 | 1 | 0 |
| 6 | 13 | DF | (Singapore) | Shariff Samat | 2 | 0 | 1 | 0 | 0 | 0 | 0 | 0 | 0 | 2 | 0 | 1 |
| 7 | 20 | MF | (Singapore) | Ang Zhiwei | 3 | 0 | 0 | 1 | 0 | 0 | 0 | 0 | 0 | 4 | 0 | 0 |
| 7 | 9 | FW | (Singapore) | Goh Swee Swee | 2 | 0 | 0 | 1 | 0 | 0 | 1 | 0 | 0 | 4 | 0 | 0 |
| 8 | 2 | DF | (South Korea) | Cho Sung-hwan | 2 | 0 | 0 | 0 | 0 | 0 | 1 | 0 | 0 | 3 | 0 | 0 |
| 8 | 8 | MF | (Singapore) | Armanizam Dolah | 2 | 0 | 0 | 0 | 0 | 0 | 1 | 0 | 0 | 3 | 0 | 0 |
| 8 | 15 | FW | (Singapore) | Fadhil Noh | 0 | 0 | 0 | 1 | 0 | 0 | 2 | 0 | 0 | 3 | 0 | 0 |
| 9 | 18 | GK | (Singapore) | Yazid Yasin | 2 | 0 | 0 | 0 | 0 | 0 | 0 | 0 | 0 | 2 | 0 | 0 |
| 9 | 19 | MF | (Singapore) | Ridhwan Osman | 2 | 0 | 0 | 0 | 0 | 0 | 0 | 0 | 0 | 2 | 0 | 0 |
| 10 | 6 | MF | (Japan) | Atsushi Shimono | 1 | 0 | 0 | 0 | 0 | 0 | 0 | 0 | 0 | 1 | 0 | 0 |
| 10 | 7 | FW | (South Korea) | Jang Jo-yoon | 1 | 0 | 0 | 0 | 0 | 0 | 0 | 0 | 0 | 1 | 0 | 0 |
| 10 | 17 | FW | (Singapore) | Farizal Basri | 1 | 0 | 0 | 0 | 0 | 0 | 0 | 0 | 0 | 1 | 0 | 0 |
| | | | | TOTALS | 39 | 3 | 2 | 5 | 0 | 0 | 7 | 3 | 0 | 52 | 5 | 2 |

Updated to games played on 16 July 2013

== Prime League ==
=== Prime League squad ===
As of 22 April 2013

Note: Flags indicate national team as defined under FIFA eligibility rules; some limited exceptions apply. Players may hold more than one non-FIFA nationality.

| No. | Pos. | Nation | Player |
|---|---|---|---|
| 21 | MF | SGP | Ahmad Khair Izzat |
| 23 | DF | SGP | Dinie Fitri (Captain) |
| 24 | MF | SGP | Divesh Rajendran |
| 25 | GK | SGP | Murtadza Abdul Rahim |
| 26 | FW | SGP | Mohamad Rashid Jalaluddin |
| 27 | FW | SGP | Andy Ahmad |
| 28 | MF | SGP | Muhammad Rahimi Buhari |
| 29 | DF | SGP | Aidil Malik Mazlan |

| No. | Pos. | Nation | Player |
|---|---|---|---|
| 30 | GK | SGP | Fearghus Lyle Bruce |
| 31 | FW | CHN | Chen Peng |
| 32 | MF | SGP | Muhammad Khamarul |
| 34 | DF | SGP | Muhammad Hidayat Yanis |
| 35 | DF | SGP | Ho Zhi Zhong Lester |
| 37 | FW | SGP | R Sharvin Ganesh |
| 39 | MF | SGP | Mohammad Adil Yusof |
| 40 | DF | SGP | Zulkarnain Malik |

=== Prime League table ===
| Pos | Team | Pld | W | D | L | GF | GA | GD | Pts |
|---|---|---|---|---|---|---|---|---|---|
| 1 | Balestier Khalsa | 15 | 11 | 1 | 3 | 33 | 12 | +21 | 34 |
| 2 | Home United | 14 | 9 | 3 | 2 | 27 | 12 | +15 | 30 |
| 3 | Geylang International | 15 | 9 | 2 | 4 | 30 | 19 | +11 | 29 |
| 4 | NFA Reds (U-18) | 14 | 8 | 1 | 5 | 28 | 17 | +11 | 25 |
| 5 | Tanjong Pagar United | 15 | 6 | 3 | 6 | 26 | 18 | +8 | 21 |
| 6 | Hougang United | 15 | 5 | 3 | 7 | 28 | 40 | −12 | 18 |
| 7 | NFA Blues (U-17) | 16 | 5 | 2 | 9 | 18 | 36 | −18 | 17 |
| 8 | Warriors F.C. | 15 | 3 | 4 | 8 | 20 | 29 | −9 | 13 |
| 9 | Woodlands Wellington | 14 | 3 | 3 | 8 | 26 | 38 | −12 | 12 |
| 10 | Tampines Rovers | 15 | 3 | 2 | 10 | 14 | 29 | −15 | 11 |

Updated to match(es) played on 17 June 2013. Source: Standings
Rules for classification: 1) points; 2) goal difference; 3) number of goals scored.

=== Prime League results summary ===
| Overall | | | | | | | | Home | | | | | | Away | | | | | |
| Pld | W | D | L | GF | GA | GD | Pts | W | D | L | GF | GA | GD | W | D | L | GF | GA | GD |
|---|---|---|---|---|---|---|---|---|---|---|---|---|---|---|---|---|---|---|---|
| 14 | 3 | 3 | 8 | 26 | 38 | −12 | 12 | 2 | 1 | 4 | 13 | 18 | −5 | 1 | 2 | 4 | 13 | 20 | −7 |

Last updated: 17 June 2013.

=== Prime League results by round ===
| Round | 1 | 2 | 3 | 4 | 5 | 6 | 7 | 8 | 9 | 10 | 11 | 12 | 13 | 14 | 15 | 16 | 17 | 18 | 19 | 20 | 21 | 22 | 23 | 24 | 25 | 26 | 27 |
|---|---|---|---|---|---|---|---|---|---|---|---|---|---|---|---|---|---|---|---|---|---|---|---|---|---|---|---|
| Ground | H | H | A | A | H | H | A | H | A | H | H | H | A | A | H | A | A | A | A | A | H | H | H | A | H | H | H |
| Result | L | L | W | D | L | D | D | W | L | L | L | W | L | L | | | | | | | | | | | | | |

Updated to match(es) played on 17 June 2013. Source: Matches and sleague.com
A = Away; H = Home; W = Win; D = Draw; L = Loss

== Prime League matches ==
=== Round 1 ===
| 2 March 2013 1 | Woodlands Wellington | 1–3 | Geylang International | Woodlands Stadium |
| 17:00 (UTC+8) | Adil Yusof (yellow card) 46'; Fadhil Noh 47'; Divesh Rajendran (yellow card) 55'; Fariss Haiqel (yellow card) 89' | Details | 10' 65' Ahmad Khidhir; 43' Fuad Ramli; (yellow card) 92' Hyder Ismail | Referee: Shahul Hameed |

| 9 March 2013 2 | Woodlands Wellington | 1–2 | Home United | Woodlands Stadium |
| 17:00 (UTC+8) | Andy Ahmad 19'; Zulkarnain Malik (yellow card) 29'; Hidayat Yanis (yellow card) 59'; Hidayat Yanis (yellow card) 62' (red card); Divesh Rajendran (yellow card) 71'; Aidil Malik (yellow card) 72'; Farizal Basri (yellow card) 94' | Details | (yellow card) 12' Zulfadhli Suzliman; (yellow card) 15' Luqman Ismail; (yellow card) 65' (red card) Luqman Ismail; (yellow card) 65' (red card) Luqman Ismail; 80' Teck Yi Sim; 89' Song Ui Young | Referee: Ong Chai Lee |

| 16 March 2013 3 | Hougang United | 1–6 | Woodlands Wellington | Hougang Stadium |
| 17:00 (UTC+8) | Shameer Aziq 68' | Details | 28' Rashid Jalaluddin; 36', 49', 69', 86' Moon Soon-ho; 63', (yellow card) 63' Divesh Rajendran | Referee: Zulfiqar Rosli |

| 25 March 2013 4 | Warriors F.C. | 0–0 | Woodlands Wellington | Choa Chu Kang Stadium |
| 19:30 (UTC+8) | Herman Osman (yellow card) 23'; Faizal Roslan (yellow card) 61'; Asyik Abdullah (yellow card) 81' | Details | (yellow card) 63' Rahimi Buhari; (yellow card) 72' Divesh Rajendran; (yellow card) 81' Hidayat Yanis; (yellow card) 82' Andy Ahmad; (yellow card) 84' Chen Peng | Referee: Mohd Hidhir |

| 3 April 2013 5 | Woodlands Wellington | 2–3 | Tanjong Pagar United | Woodlands Stadium |
| 19:30 (UTC+8) | Aidil Yusof (yellow card) 3'; Hidhir Hasbiallah 11'; Rashid Jalaluddin 32'; Chen Peng (yellow card) 59' | Details | 8' Zulfadhli Emran; 17', 92' Rizawan Abdullah; (yellow card) 71'; (yellow card) 90' Seah Si Hao | Referee: Manoj Kalwani |

| 7 April 2013 | Tampines Rovers | Match Abandoned* | Woodlands Wellington | Clementi Stadium |
| 17:00 (UTC+8) |

| 13 April 2013 6 | Woodlands Wellington | 1–1 | Balestier Khalsa | Woodlands Stadium |
| 17:00 (UTC+8) | Divesh Rajendran (yellow card) 5'; Aidil Yusof (yellow card) 27'; Andy Ahmad (yellow card) 30'; Hidayat Yanis (yellow card) 67'; Farouq Farkhan 94', (yellow card) 94' | Details | 70' Yusiskandar Yusop; (yellow card) 85' Haiqal Noor | Referee: Yazeen Buhari |

| 20 April 2013 7 | NFA Reds (U-18) | 3–3 | Woodlands Wellington | Bukit Gombak Stadium |
| 17:00 (UTC+8) | Hanafi Akbar 47'; Muhaimin Suhaimi 58'; Illyas Lee (yellow card) 75' (og) Zulkarnain Malik 80'; Azrin Hamdan (yellow card) 91', (yellow card) 93' (red card) | Details | 27' Fariss Haiqel (pen); (yellow card) 42' Divesh Rajendran; 46', 94' Farouq Farkhan | Referee: Muhd Syahir |

| 28 April 2013 8 | Woodlands Wellington | 3–1 | NFA Blues (U-17) | Woodlands Stadium |
| 17:00 (UTC+8) | Fadhil Noh 44', 84', (yellow card) 92'; Divesh Rajendran (yellow card) 47'; Ridhwan Osman 48'; Divesh Rajendran (yellow card) 47'; Aidil Yusof (yellow card) 52'; Dinie Fitri (yellow card) 68' | Details | Ashshiddiq Misban 23'; Iqram Rifqi (red card) 43'; Sadik Said (yellow card) 73' | Referee: Muhd Zulfiqar |

Match abandoned due to inclement weather.

=== Round 2 ===
| 4 May 2013 9 | Geylang International | 5–0 | Woodlands Wellington | Bedok Stadium |
| 17:00 (UTC+8) | Nazirul Islam 3', 36'; Harithzan Jantan (yellow card) 44'; Ahmad Khidhir 50', 87'; Duncan Elias (yellow card) 82'; Nurul Islam 90' | Details | | Referee: C M Subash |

| 13 May 2013 10 | Home United | 5–2 | Woodlands Wellington | Bishan Stadium |
| 19:30 (UTC+8) | Shazwan Said 27'; Syahiran Miswan 33'; Rafiq Jamal 51'; Nur Hizami 66', 84' | Details | 20' Goh Swee Swee; 70' Chen Peng | Referee: Andrew Kee |

| 19 May 2013 11 | Woodlands Wellington | 1–5 | Hougang United | Woodlands Stadium |
| 17:00 (UTC+8) | Andy Ahmad 46' | Details | 23', 52', 60' Jerome Baker; 44' Shameer Aziq; 90' Robert Eziakor | Referee: Syed Ibrahim |

| 26 May 2013 12 | Woodlands Wellington | 4–3 | Warriors F.C. | Woodlands Stadium |
| 17:00 (UTC+8) | Khalid Hamdaoui 9'; Farouq Farkhan 53'; Divesh Rajendren 72'; Andy Ahmad 82' | Details | 8' Ismail Juraime; 13' Bharath Ravindren; 92' Amirul Haziq | Referee: Simon Ong |

| 6 June 2013 13 | Tampines Rovers | 2–1 | Woodlands Wellington | Clementi Stadium |
| 19:30 (UTC+8) | Cameron Bell 58'; Tajuddin Radzuan 88' | Details | 33' Andy Ahmad | Referee: K Kalimuthu |

| 17 June 2013 14 | Balestier Khalsa | 4–1 | Woodlands Wellington | Toa Payoh Stadium |
| 19:30 (UTC+8) | Suria Prakash 68',(pen) 72'; Syahir Sahimi 87'; Casteels Tzu-Ming 92' | Details | 49' Fearghus Bruce | Referee: Muhd Syahir |

| 3 July 2013 15 | Woodlands Wellington | v | NFA Reds (U-18) | Woodlands Stadium |
| 17:00 (UTC+8) |

=== Round 3 ===
| 7 July 2013 16 | Geylang International | v | Woodlands Wellington | Bedok Stadium |
| 17:00 (UTC+8) |

| 17 July 2013 17 | Tanjong Pagar United | v | Woodlands Wellington | Queenstown Stadium |
| 20:00 (UTC+8) |

| 28 July 2013 18 | Hougang United | v | Woodlands Wellington | Hougang Stadium |
| 20:00 (UTC+8) |

| 31 July 2013 19 | NFA Blues (U-17) | v | Woodlands Wellington | Yishun Stadium |
| 17:00 (UTC+8) |

| 5 August 2013 20 | Warriors F.C. | v | Woodlands Wellington | Choa Chu Kang Stadium |
| 20:00 (UTC+8) |

| 21 August 2013 21 | Woodlands Wellington | v | Tampines Rovers | Woodlands Stadium |
| 17:00 (UTC+8) |

| 25 August 2013 22 | Woodlands Wellington | v | Tanjong Pagar United | Woodlands Stadium |
| 17:00 (UTC+8) |

| 28 August 2013 23 | Woodlands Wellington | v | Home United | Woodlands Stadium |
| 20:00 (UTC+8) |

| 31 August 2013 24 | Tampines Rovers | v | Woodlands Wellington | Clementi Stadium |
| 17:00 (UTC+8) |

| 14 September 2013 25 | Woodlands Wellington | v | Balestier Khalsa | Woodlands Stadium |
| 17:00 (UTC+8) |

| 2 October 2013 26 | NFA Reds (U-18) | v | Woodlands Wellington | Bukit Gombak Stadium |
| 19:30 (UTC+8) |

| 5 October 2013 27 | Woodlands Wellington | v | NFA Blues (U-17) | Woodlands Stadium |
| 17:00 (UTC+8) |

=== Appearances and goals ===
| No. | Pos | Nat | Player | Total | | Prime League | | FA Cup | |
| No. | Pos | Nat | Player | Apps | Goals | Apps | Goals | Apps | Goals |
|---|---|---|---|---|---|---|---|---|---|
| 25 | GK | (Singapore) SGP | Murtadza Abdul Rahim | 5 | 0 | 3+2 | 0 | 0+0 | 0 |
| 30 | GK | (Singapore) SGP | Fearghus Bruce | 12 | 1 | 10+2 | 1 | 0+0 | 0 |
| 3 | DF | (Singapore) SGP | Hidhir Hasbiallah | 4 | 1 | 4+0 | 1 | 0+0 | 0 |
| 13 | DF | (Singapore) SGP | Shariff Samat | 1 | 0 | 1+0 | 0 | 0+0 | 0 |
| 22 | DF | (Singapore) SGP | Fariss Haiqel Mohd Hamran | 6 | 1 | 5+1 | 1 | 0+0 | 0 |
| 23 | DF | (Singapore) SGP | Dinie Fitri | 13 | 0 | 13+0 | 0 | 0+0 | 0 |
| 29 | DF | (Singapore) SGP | Aidil Malik Mazlan | 11 | 0 | 6+5 | 0 | 0+0 | 0 |
| 34 | DF | (Singapore) SGP | Hidayat Yanis | 13 | 0 | 12+1 | 0 | 0+0 | 0 |
| 35 | DF | (Singapore) SGP | Ho Zhi Zhong Lester | 13 | 0 | 4+9 | 0 | 0+0 | 0 |
| 40 | DF | (Singapore) SGP | Zulkarnain Malik | 14 | 0 | 13+1 | 0 | 0+0 | 0 |
| 5 | MF | (Netherlands) NED | Khalid Hamdaoui | 1 | 1 | 1+0 | 1 | 0+0 | 0 |
| 11 | MF | (Singapore) SGP | Taufiq Rahmat | 1 | 0 | 1+0 | 0 | 0+0 | 0 |
| 12 | MF | (Singapore) SGP | Oswind Suriya | 5 | 0 | 5+0 | 0 | 0+0 | 0 |
| 16 | MF | (Singapore) SGP | Farouq Farkhan | 8 | 4 | 8+0 | 4 | 0+0 | 0 |
| 19 | MF | (Singapore) SGP | Ridhwan Osman | 2 | 1 | 2+0 | 1 | 0+0 | 0 |
| 21 | MF | (Singapore) SGP | Ahmad Khair Izzat | 5 | 0 | 1+4 | 0 | 0+0 | 0 |
| 28 | MF | (Singapore) SGP | Rahimi Buhari | 10 | 0 | 4+6 | 0 | 0+0 | 0 |
| 24 | MF | (Singapore) SGP | Divesh Rajendran | 12 | 2 | 11+1 | 2 | 0+0 | 0 |
| 32 | MF | (Singapore) SGP | Khamarul Majid | 14 | 0 | 5+9 | 0 | 0+0 | 0 |
| 39 | MF | (Singapore) SGP | Aidil Yusof | 10 | 0 | 7+3 | 0 | 0+0 | 0 |
| 9 | FW | (Singapore) SGP | Goh Swee Swee | 1 | 1 | 1+0 | 1 | 0+0 | 0 |
| 10 | FW | (South Korea) KOR | Moon Soon-ho | 1 | 4 | 1+0 | 4 | 0+0 | 0 |
| 15 | FW | (Singapore) SGP | Fadhil Noh | 3 | 3 | 3+0 | 3 | 0+0 | 0 |
| 17 | FW | (Singapore) SGP | Farizal Basri | 3 | 0 | 3+0 | 0 | 0+0 | 0 |
| 26 | FW | (Singapore) SGP | Rashid Jalaluddin | 7 | 2 | 6+1 | 2 | 0+0 | 0 |
| 27 | FW | (Singapore) SGP | Andy Ahmad | 12 | 4 | 9+3 | 4 | 0+0 | 0 |
| 31 | FW | (China) CHN | Chen Peng | 14 | 1 | 12+2 | 1 | 0+0 | 0 |
| 37 | FW | (Singapore) SGP | R Sharvin Ganesh | 3 | 0 | 0+3 | 0 | 0+0 | 0 |

Last updated: 17 June 2013
Source: Match reports in Competitive matches

=== Prime League goalscoring statistics ===
Includes all competitive matches. The list is sorted by shirt number when total goals are equal.

| Ran | No. | Pos | Nat | Name | Prime League | FA Cup | Total |
|---|---|---|---|---|---|---|---|
| 1 | 10 | FW | (South Korea) | Moon Soon-ho | 4 | 0 | 4 |
| 1 | 16 | MF | (Singapore) | Farouq Farkhan | 4 | 0 | 4 |
| 1 | 27 | FW | (Singapore) | Andy Ahmad | 4 | 0 | 4 |
| 2 | 15 | FW | (Singapore) | Fadhil Noh | 3 | 0 | 3 |
| 3 | 24 | MF | (Singapore) | Divesh Rajendren | 2 | 0 | 2 |
| 3 | 26 | MF | (Singapore) | Rashid Jalaluddin | 2 | 0 | 2 |
| 3 | 3 | DF | (Singapore) | Hidhir Hasbiallah | 1 | 0 | 1 |
| 3 | 5 | MF | (Netherlands) | Khalid Hamdaoui | 1 | 0 | 1 |
| 3 | 9 | FW | (Singapore) | Goh Swee Swee | 1 | 0 | 1 |
| 3 | 19 | MF | (Singapore) | Ridhwan Osman | 1 | 0 | 1 |
| 3 | 22 | DF | (Singapore) | Fariss Haiqel | 1 | 0 | 1 |
| 3 | 30 | GK | (Singapore) | Fearghus Bruce | 1 | 0 | 1 |
| 3 | 31 | FW | (China) | Chen Peng | 1 | 0 | 1 |
| | | | | TOTALS | 26 | 0 | 26 |

Updated to games played on 17 June 2013

=== Prime League disciplinary record ===
Includes all competitive matches. The list is sorted by shirt number when total cards are equal.

| R | No. | Pos | Nat | Name | Prime League | | | FA Cup | | | Total | | |
| R | No. | Pos | Nat | Name | Yellow card | (yellow card) (yellow-red card) | Red card | Yellow card | (yellow card) (yellow-red card) | Red card | Yellow card | (yellow card) (yellow-red card) | Red card |
| 1 | 34 | DF | (Singapore) | Hidayat Yanis | 3 | 1 | 0 | 0 | 0 | 0 | 3 | 1 | 0 |
| 2 | 24 | MF | (Singapore) | Divesh Rajendran | 9 | 0 | 0 | 0 | 0 | 0 | 9 | 0 | 0 |
| 3 | 39 | MF | (Singapore) | Adil Yusof | 4 | 0 | 0 | 0 | 0 | 0 | 4 | 0 | 0 |
| 4 | 16 | MF | (Singapore) | Farouq Farkhan | 3 | 0 | 0 | 0 | 0 | 0 | 3 | 0 | 0 |
| 4 | 40 | DF | (Singapore) | Zulkarnain Malik | 3 | 0 | 0 | 0 | 0 | 0 | 3 | 0 | 0 |
| 4 | 23 | DF | (Singapore) | Dinie Fitri | 2 | 0 | 0 | 0 | 0 | 0 | 2 | 0 | 0 |
| 4 | 27 | FW | (Singapore) | Andy Ahmad | 2 | 0 | 0 | 0 | 0 | 0 | 2 | 0 | 0 |
| 4 | 28 | MF | (Singapore) | Rahimi Buhari | 2 | 0 | 0 | 0 | 0 | 0 | 2 | 0 | 0 |
| 4 | 31 | FW | (China) | Chen Peng | 2 | 0 | 0 | 0 | 0 | 0 | 2 | 0 | 0 |
| 5 | 5 | MF | (Netherlands) | Khalid Hamdaoui | 1 | 0 | 0 | 0 | 0 | 0 | 1 | 0 | 0 |
| 5 | 13 | DF | (Singapore) | Shariff Samat | 1 | 0 | 0 | 0 | 0 | 0 | 1 | 0 | 0 |
| 5 | 15 | FW | (Singapore) | Fadhil Noh | 1 | 0 | 0 | 0 | 0 | 0 | 1 | 0 | 0 |
| 5 | 17 | FW | (Singapore) | Farizal Basri | 1 | 0 | 0 | 0 | 0 | 0 | 1 | 0 | 0 |
| 5 | 19 | MF | (Singapore) | Ridhwan Osman | 1 | 0 | 0 | 0 | 0 | 0 | 1 | 0 | 0 |
| 5 | 22 | DF | (Singapore) | Fariss Haiqel | 1 | 0 | 0 | 0 | 0 | 0 | 1 | 0 | 0 |
| 5 | 29 | DF | (Singapore) | Aidil Malik | 1 | 0 | 0 | 0 | 0 | 0 | 1 | 0 | 0 |
| 5 | 32 | MF | (Singapore) | Khamarul Majid | 1 | 0 | 0 | 0 | 0 | 0 | 1 | 0 | 0 |
| 5 | 39 | MF | (Singapore) | Aidil Yusof | 1 | 0 | 0 | 0 | 0 | 0 | 1 | 0 | 0 |
| | | | | TOTALS | 39 | 1 | 0 | 0 | 0 | 0 | 39 | 1 | 0 |

Last updated: 17 June 2013
Source: Match reports in Competitive matches
