= Fadhil Noh =

Singaporean footballer (born 1989)

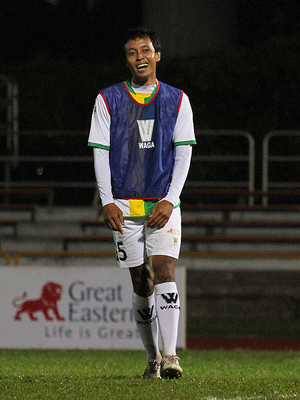
- Fadhil Noh turning out for Woodlands Wellington in 2013

Personal information
- Full name: Muhammad Fadhil bin Noh
- Date of birth: 4 March 1989 (age 37)
- Place of birth: Singapore
- Height: 1.80 m (5 ft 11 in)
- Position: Forward

Team information
- Current team: Warriors
- Number: 15

Senior career*
| Years | Team | Apps | (Gls) |
| 2008–2011 | Courts Young Lions | 31 | (3) |
| 2011–2012 | Home United | 0 | (0) |
| 2013–2015 | Woodlands Wellington | 32 | (2) |
| 2015–2016 | Balestier Khalsa FC | 0 | (0) |
| 2017– | Warriors | | |

International career
| 2009 | Singapore U23 | ?? | (1) |
| 2010 – | Singapore | 1 | (0) |
- * Club domestic league appearances and goals as of 16 July 2013

Muhammad Fadhil bin Noh (born 4 March 1989) is a footballer who plays for Warriors FC in the S.League.

A former youth international who played for the Young Lions, he was a member of the bronze medal-winning Singapore football team during the 2009 Southeast Asian Games, scoring a goal in the bronze medal playoff against Laos as well.

== Club career ==
Fadhil started off his S.League career with the Courts Young Lions in 2008. He spent three seasons with the Young Lions before he was conscripted for national service.

While serving his national service, Fadhil turned out for Home United in the Prime League.

On 2 January 2013, Woodlands Wellington announced that Fadhil had agreed to terms and will join them for the 2013 season.

He made his debut for the Rams on 5 March 2013 in an away game against his former club, Home United FC, coming on as a second-half substitute for Jang Jo-Yoon, and made his first start for the Rams against Warriors F.C. on 25 May 2013.

=== Club career statistics ===
As of 16 July 2013

Fadhil Noh's Profile

| Club Performance | | League | | Cup | | League Cup | | Total | | | | |
| Singapore | | S.League | | Singapore Cup | | League Cup | | Total | | | | |
| Club | Season | Apps | Goals | Apps | Goals | Apps | Goals | Yellow card | (yellow card) (yellow-red card) | Red card | Apps | Goals |
|---|---|---|---|---|---|---|---|---|---|---|---|---|
| Courts Young Lions | 2009 | 13 (8) | 3 | 0 | 0 | 0 | 0 | 0 | 0 | 0 | 13 (8) | 3 |
| Courts Young Lions | 2010 | 7 (1) | 2 | 0 | 1 | 0 | 2 | 0 | 0 | 0 | 7 (1) | 0 |
| Courts Young Lions | 2011 | 2 | 0 | 0 | 0 | 0 | 0 | 0 | 0 | 0 | 2 | 0 |
| Home United | 2012 | 0 | 0 | 0 | 0 | 0 | 0 | 0 | 0 | 0 | 0 | 0 |
| Woodlands Wellington | 2013 | 2 (8) | 0 | 1 | 0 | 4 | 0 | 3 | 0 | 0 | 7 (8) | 0 |

All numbers encased in brackets signify substitute appearances.

== International career ==
Fadhil has a solitary appearances for Singapore, coming on as a substitute for Shukor Zailan in the 64th minute during a friendly match against Poland on 23 January 2010.

=== International appearances ===
| # | Date | Venue | Opponent | Result | Competition |
|---|---|---|---|---|---|
| 1. | 23 January 2010 | 80th Birthday Stadium, Mueang Nakhon Ratchasima District, Thailand | Poland | 1–6 | Friendly |
Updated 1 January 2013
