= Taufiq Rahmat =

Singaporean footballer (born 1987)

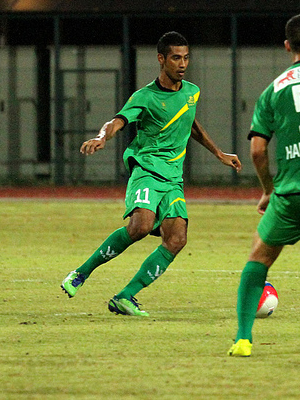
- Taufiq Rahmat turning out for Woodlands Wellington in 2013.

Personal information
- Full name: Muhamad Taufiq bin Rahmat
- Date of birth: 18 October 1987 (age 39)
- Place of birth: Singapore
- Height: 1.78 m (5 ft 10 in)
- Position: Midfielder

Senior career*
Years	Team	Apps	(Gls)
2009–2010	Tampines Rovers	2	(0)
2011	Tanjong Pagar United	14	(0)
2012	LionsXII	5	(0)
2013	Woodlands Wellington	14	(0)
- * Club domestic league appearances and goals as of 16 July 2013

Taufiq Rahmat (born 18 October 1987) is a Singaporean retired footballer who last played for Woodlands Wellington FC, primarily as a midfielder.

A member of the Singapore-based LionsXII squad which finished second during its inaugural season in the 2012 Malaysia Super League, Taufiq returned to the S.League when it was announced that he had signed for Woodlands Wellington ahead of the 2013 season.

Prior to playing for the LionsXII, Taufiq also turned out for S.League clubs Tanjong Pagar United and Tampines Rovers.

He made his debut for Woodlands Wellington on 21 February 2013 in a 2–2 draw against Warriors F.C., coming on as a second-half substitute for Farizal Basri.

Taufiq retired from professional football at the end of 2013 season.

== Club career statistics ==
As of 16 July 2013

Rahmat's career statistics:

Club Performance		League		Cup		League Cup		Champions League		Total				
Singapore		S.League		Singapore Cup		League Cup		AFC Cup		Total				
Club	Season	Apps	Goals	Apps	Goals	Apps	Goals	Apps	Goals	Yellow card	(yellow card) (yellow-red card)	Red card	Apps	Goals
Tampines Rovers	2009	0 (1)	0	0	0	0	0	-	-	0	0	0	0 (1)	0
Tampines Rovers	2010	0	0	0	0	0	0	-	-	0	0	0	0	0
Tampines Rovers	2011	0 (1)	0	0	0	0	0	0 (1)	0	0	0	0	0 (2)	0
Tanjong Pagar	2011	12 (2)	1	0	0 (1)	0	0	-	-	4	0	0	13 (3)	0
Club Performance		League		Cup		League Cup		Champions League		Total				
Malaysia		Malaysia Super League		Malaysia Cup		N.A		N.A		Total				
Club	Season	Apps	Goals	Apps	Goals	Apps	Goals	Apps	Goals	Yellow card	(yellow card) (yellow-red card)	Red card	Apps	Goals
LionsXII	2012	0 (2)	0	0	0	0	0	-	-	0	0	0	0 (2)	0
Club Performance		League		Cup		League Cup		Champions League		Total				
Singapore		S.League		Singapore Cup		League Cup		AFC Cup		Total				
Club	Season	Apps	Goals	Apps	Goals	Apps	Goals	Apps	Goals	Yellow card	(yellow card) (yellow-red card)	Red card	Apps	Goals
Woodlands Wellington	2013	6 (8)	0	1	0	1 (1)	0	-	-	5	1	0	8 (9)	0

All numbers encased in brackets signify substitute appearances.

=== Appearances in AFC Cup competitions ===
#	Date	Venue	Club	Opponent	Result	Competition
1.	3 May 2011	Jalan Besar Stadium, Singapore	(Singapore) Tampines Rovers	(Maldives) Victory Sports Club	4–0	2011 AFC Cup
Updated 8 January 2012
