= Shahril Alias =

Singaporean footballer

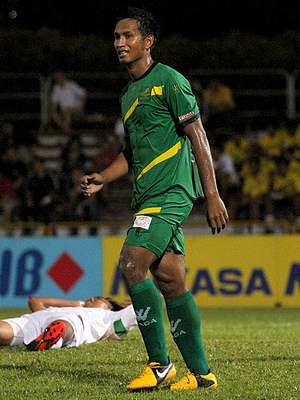
- Shahril Alias in action for Woodlands Wellington against Geylang International in a S.League match at Woodlands Stadium on 18 April 2013

Personal information
- Full name: Muhammad Shahril bin Mohamad Alias
- Date of birth: 14 May 1984 (age 42)
- Place of birth: Singapore
- Height: 1.76 m (5 ft 9 1/2 in)
- Positions: Defender; midfielder

Team information
- Current team: Woodlands Wellington
- Number: 4

Senior career*
Years	Team	Apps	(Gls)
2003–2004	Woodlands Wellington FC	6	(0)
2005	Young Lions	9	(0)
2006–2010	Home United FC	103	(1)
2011	Hougang United FC	11	(0)
2012	Geylang United FC	22	(0)
2013–	Woodlands Wellington	15	(0)

International career^{‡}
2008–	Singapore	2	(0)
- * Club domestic league appearances and goals as of 16 July 2013 ‡ National team caps and goals as of 1 January 2013

Muhammad Shahril bin Mohamad Alias (born 14 May 1984) is a professional football player who plays for the Woodlands Wellington in the S.League.

He is a natural centre-back, though he can also play as a defensive midfielder or a right back.

== Club career ==
Shahril has previously played for S.League clubs Woodlands Wellington, Young Lions, Home United and Hougang United FC.

In 2011, Shahril was transferred to Hougang United FC, replacing Fumiya Kobayashi at the centre back role. He made his debut for the Cheetahs against Gombak United on 30 June 2011 alongside Vitor Borges and was influential in Hougang's 3–2 win.

When his contract with Hougang expired at the end of the 2011 S.League season, he was transferred to Geylang United FC.

On 1 January 2013, it was announced that Shahril had joined Woodlands Wellington along with Ang Zhiwei after spending one season at Bedok Stadium, joining up with former Geylang United captain and goalkeeper, Yazid Yasin.

He made his debut for Woodlands Wellington on 21 February 2013 in a 2–2 draw against Warriors F.C.

His personal achievements include being a S.League runner-up with Home United in 2007, and a League Cup runner-up with Geylang United in 2012.

== Club career statistics ==
As of 16 July 2013

Shahril Alias's Profile

Club Performance		League		Cup		League Cup		Total				
Singapore		S.League		Singapore Cup		League Cup		Total				
Club	Season	Apps	Goals	Apps	Goals	Apps	Goals	Yellow card	(yellow card) (yellow-red card)	Red card	Apps	Goals
Home United	2009	23 (2)	0	0	0	0	0	6	0	0	23 (3)	0
Home United	2010	9	0	0	0	0	0	2	0	0	9	0
Home United	2011	0	0	0	0	0	0	0	0	0	0	0
Hougang United	2011	10 (1)	4	0	4	0	0	2	0	0	18 (1)	0
Geylang United	2012	22 (1)	0	0	0	4	0	5	0	0	26 (1)	0
Woodlands Wellington	2013	14 (1)	0	0	0	4	0	8	2	0	18 (1)	0

All numbers encased in brackets signify substitute appearances.

=== Appearances in AFC Cup Competitions ===
#	Date	Venue	Club	Opponent	Result	Competition
1.	18 Mar 2008	Jalan Besar Stadium, Singapore	Home United	(Malaysia) Kedah FA	5–1	2008 AFC Cup Group Stage
2.	3 Apr 2008	Jalan Besar Stadium, Singapore	Home United	(Maldives) Victory SC	2–1	2008 AFC Cup Group Stage
3.	16 Apr 2008	Maldives National Stadium, Malé, Maldives	Home United	(Maldives) Victory SC	3–1	2009 AFC Cup Group Stage
4.	30 Apr 2008	Jalan Besar Stadium, Singapore	Home United	(Hong Kong) South China	4–1	2008 AFC Cup Group Stage
5.	14 May 2008	Darul Aman Stadium, Kedah, Malaysia	Home United	(Malaysia) Kedah FA	1–4	2009 AFC Cup Group Stage
6.	16 Sep 2008	Jalan Besar Stadium, Singapore	Home United	(India) Dempo SC	3–4	2008 AFC Cup Quarter-finals (2nd Leg)
7.	10 Mar 2009	Jalan Besar Stadium, Singapore	Home United	(Vietnam) Bình Dương F.C.	2–1	2009 AFC Cup Group Stage
8.	17 Mar 2009	Suphachalasai Stadium, Bangkok, Thailand	Home United	(Thailand) PEA FC	1–2	2009 AFC Cup Group Stage
9.	7 Apr 2009	Rasmee Dhandu Stadium, Malé, Maldives	Home United	(Maldives) Club Valencia	1–0	2009 AFC Cup Group Stage
10.	21 Apr 2009	Jalan Besar Stadium, Singapore	Home United	(Maldives) Club Valencia	5–1	2009 AFC Cup Group Stage
11.	5 May 2009	Gò Đậu Stadium, Thủ Dầu Một, Vietnam	Home United	(Vietnam) Bình Dương F.C.	0–2	2009 AFC Cup Group Stage
12.	19 May 2009	Jalan Besar Stadium, Singapore	Home United	(Thailand) PEA FC	3–1	2009 AFC Cup Group Stage
Records start from 2008 to the present. Updated as of 12 January 2013

== International career ==
Shahril has 2 substitute appearances for Singapore in a 2010 World Cup Qualifier against Uzbekistan on 7 June 2008, and a friendly match against Poland on 23 January 2010.

=== International Appearances ===
#	Date	Venue	Opponent	Result	Competition
1.	7 June 2008	MHSK Stadium, Tashkent, Uzbekistan	Uzbekistan	0–3	2010 World Cup Qualifier
2.	23 January 2010	80th Birthday Stadium, Mueang Nakhon Ratchasima District, Thailand	Poland	1–6	Friendly
Updated 4 November 2012
