= Ridhwan Osman =

Singaporean footballer

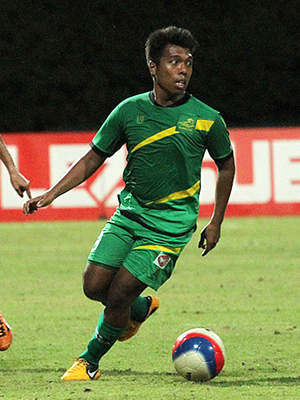
- Ridhwan Osman turning out for Woodlands Wellington in 2013.

Personal information
- Full name: Ridhwan bin Osman
- Date of birth: 27 December 1987 (age 38)
- Place of birth: Singapore
- Height: 1.62 m (5 ft 4 in)
- Position: Midfielder

Senior career*
Years	Team	Apps	(Gls)
2010	Home United	1	(0)
2011	Balestier Khalsa	27	(0)
2012	Hougang United	8	(0)
2013	Woodlands Wellington	11	(0)
- * Club domestic league appearances and goals as of 16 July 2013

Ridhwan Osman is a retired footballer who last played for Woodlands Wellington in the S.League.

Ridhwan was part of the Young Lions team which represented Singapore in the inaugural edition of the Thanh Nien Cup in 2007, helping the Young Lions achieve a second runner-up position in the regional U-21 international football tournament which is held annually in Vietnam.

== Club career ==
Previously turning out for Home United when he was serving his national service in 2010, Ridhwan featured prominently for Balestier Khalsa in 2011 before switching to Hougang United in 2012.

On 2 January 2013, it was announced by Woodlands Wellington that Ridhwan will join them for the 2013 season.

He made his debut for Woodlands Wellington on 26 February 2013 in a 2–1 loss against Harimau Muda B, coming on as a second-half substitute for Armanizam Dolah.

Ridhwan retired from professional football at the end of 2013 season.

=== Club career statistics ===
As of 16 July 2013

Ridhwan Osman's Profile

Club Performance		League		Cup		League Cup		Total				
Singapore		S.League		Singapore Cup		League Cup		Total				
Club	Season	Apps	Goals	Apps	Goals	Apps	Goals	Yellow card	(yellow card) (yellow-red card)	Red card	Apps	Goals
Home United	2010	0 (1)	0	0	0	0	0	0	1	0	0 (1)	0
Balestier Khalsa	2011	16 (11)	1	0	1	0	0	4	1	0	16 (11)	0
Hougang United	2012	1 (7)	0	0	0	1 (1)	0	2	0	0	1 (7)	0
Woodlands Wellington	2013	4 (7)	0	0	0	2 (1)	0	2	0	0	6 (8)	0

All numbers encased in brackets signify substitute appearances.
