= Ang Zhiwei =

Singaporean footballer

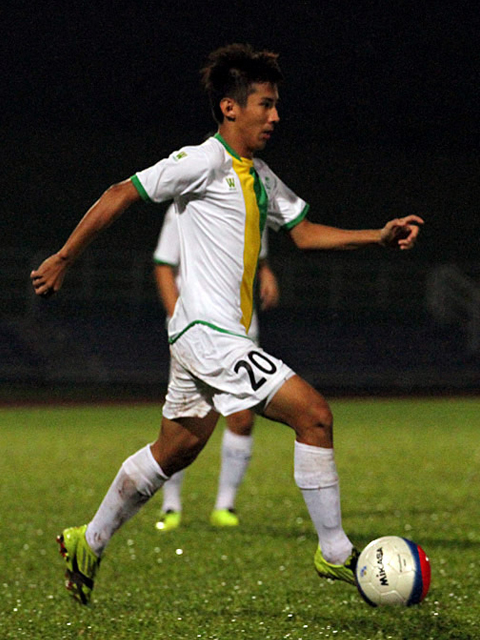
- Ang Zhi Wei turning out for Woodlands Wellington in a S.League match against Warriors F.C. on 21 February 2013.

Personal information
- Full name: Ang Zhiwei; Simplified Chinese: 洪志伟
- Date of birth: 2 August 1989 (age 37)
- Place of birth: Singapore
- Height: 1.65 m (5 ft 5 in)
- Position: Defender

Team information
- Current team: Warriors FC
- Number: 20

Senior career*
Years	Team	Apps	(Gls)
2008	SAFFC (Prime League)		
2009	Geylang United (Prime League)	3	(18)
2010 – 2011	SAFSA (NFL Division 1)		(20)
2012	Geylang United	23	(1)
2013	Woodlands Wellington	26	(2)
2014	Tampines Rovers	15	(1)
2015–2016	Home United	22	(1)

International career
2008 – 2009	Singapore U21	16	(1)
- * Club domestic league appearances and goals as of 23 August 2016

Ang Zhiwei is a Singaporean footballer who plays in the S.League for Warriors FC. He started his career as an attacking midfielder but now plays as a defender.

== Club career ==
He started to focus on football after rejection from his school's basketball team due to his height.

Ang started off as a player in the Prime League until he came to prominence in the 2009 S.League season. At that time, he took a part of the Geylang United squad which overcame reigning Singapore Cup champions, Bangkok Glass, to capture the Singapore Cup. His performance also led to being selected for the Singapore Under-21 National Team.

As he was conscripted for National Service in 2010, his professional footballing career came to a standstill. Ang turned out for NFL Division One side, Singapore Armed Forces Sports Association (SAFSA) during his two years as a national serviceman and was the captain of the SAFSA side.

=== Geylang United ===
Upon the completion of his national service, Ang returned to Geylang United for the 2012 S.League season, where he played his first full season with the Eagles.

=== Woodlands Wellington ===
On 1 January 2013, it was announced that he had joined Woodlands Wellington along with Shahril Alias after spending one season at Bedok Stadium, joining up with former Geylang United captain and goalkeeper, Yazid Yasin.

He made his debut for Woodlands Wellington on 21 February 2013 in a 2–2 draw against Warriors F.C.

=== Tampines Rovers ===
On 21 December 2013, Tampines Rovers announced the signing of Ang for the 2014 season.

=== Home United ===
Following a disappointing 2014 season, Home United signed Ang along with three other of his Tampines Rovers teammates.

== International career ==
Ang was selected for the Singapore Under-21 National Team in 2008.

While taking part in the annual Vietnam Youth Newspaper Cup competition in 2009, Ang scored his first international goal against Thailand Under-21 in a 3–1 victory on 11 October 2009.

== Club Career Statistics ==
As of 23 August 2016

Club	Season	S.League		Singapore Cup		Singapore League Cup		Total	
Club	Season	Apps	Goals	Apps	Goals	Apps	Goals	Apps	Goals
Geylang United	2012	20 (3)	1	1	0	5	0	26 (3)	1
Woodlands Wellington	2013	25 (1)	2	1	0	4	0	30	2
Tampines Rovers	2014	8 (7)	0	2 (4)	0	3	1	13 (11)	1
Home United	2015	19 (3)	1	3	0	2	1	24 (3)	2
Home United	2016	1	1	0	0	0	0	0	0

All numbers encased in brackets signify substitute appearances.
