= Jang Jo-yoon =

South Korean footballer (born 1988)

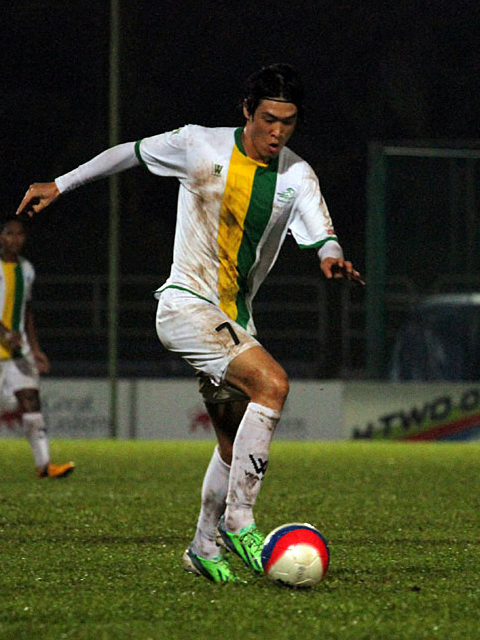
- Jang Jo-yoon turning out for Woodlands Wellington during a S.League match against Warriors F.C. on 21 February 2013

Personal information
- Date of birth: 1 January 1988 (age 38)
- Place of birth: South Korea
- Height: 1.81 m (5 ft 11 in)
- Position: Forward

Youth career
- 2003–2005: Boin High School

Senior career*
Years	Team	Apps	(Gls)
2007–2008	Jeonbuk Hyundai Motors	2	(0)
2009	Super Reds	16	(4)
2010–2011	Gombak United	55	(14)
2012	Balestier Khalsa	6	(0)
2013–2014	Woodlands Wellington	54	(20)
2015	Yongin City	5	(1)
2015–2017	Chungju Hummel	11	(1)
2017	Paju Citizen	1	(0)
2018	Gimpo	0	(0)
2018	Hougang United	8	(1)

International career
2004	South Korea U-17		
- * Club domestic league appearances and goals as of 21 July 2019

- Jang Jo-yoon
- Hangul: 장조윤
- Hanja: 張朝潤
- RR: Jang Joyun
- MR: Chang Choyun

Jang Jo-yoon (Korean: 장조윤; born 1 January 1988), alternatively spelt as Chang Jo-yoon, is a retired South Korean footballer who played as a forward.

Jang Jo-yoon initially started out as a midfielder while playing in his youth for Jeonbuk Hyundai Motors, but switched to a striker after he moved to the S. League team Super Reds in 2009.

== Club career ==
=== Jeonbuk Hyundai Motors ===
Jang spent his first two seasons as a professional player with K League team Jeonbuk Hyundai Motors in his native South Korea, the first club he signed for when he was fresh out of high school.

=== Super Reds ===
In 2009, Jang was given an opportunity to move to Singapore to play in the S League for the all-Korean team, Super Reds.

=== Gombak United ===
When the Super Reds were denied a place in the 2010 S. League, Jang headed west with compatriot Park Kang-jin to join Gombak United where he would feature prominently for the Bulls, scoring a total of fourteen goals in the S. League and one each in the Singapore Cup and Singapore League Cup.

=== Balestier Khalsa ===
Jang was then transferred to Balestier Khalsa in 2012 but found little playing time under Hala Tigers coach Darren Stewart.

=== Woodlands Wellington ===
In December 2012, it was noted that Jang was on trial with Woodlands Wellington when he was featured in the Northern Rams' lineup against Johor Darul Takzim in a pre-season friendly game. Jang scored a goal in that match and set another goal for fellow Korean Moon Soon-ho in a subsequent friendly game against Warriors FC. On 11 January 2013, it was announced that Jang had been confirmed by the club for the 2013 season. He made his debut for Woodlands Wellington on February 21, 2013, in a 2–2 draw against Warriors FC, assisting in Khalid Hamdaoui's 72nd-minute goal. Jang scored his first Woodlands Wellington goal by firing home the winning goal off Taufiq Rahmat's corner kick at a S. League match against Albirex Niigata (S) on 27 March 2013, helping the Rams beat the White Swans with a 2–1 scoreline. He also created a goal for Khalid Hamdaoui in the same match.

=== Yongin City ===
After 6 years in Singapore, Jang returned to Korea to join Yongin City FC and played in the third tier of the South Korean league.

=== Chungju Hummel ===
Halfway throughout the season, Jang joined K League 2 club, Chungju Hummel.

=== Paju Citizen ===
In 2017, Jang joined K3 League outfits, Paju Citizen.

=== Gimpo FC ===
After a season at Paju Citizen, Jang joined Gimpo FC in 2018.

=== Hougang United ===
Jang returned to Singapore to join Hougang United in July 2018. He scored his first goal for Hougang in a 3–1 win against Geylang International on 5 August 2018.

=== Return to Paju Citizen ===
In 2019, Jang returned to Korea to rejoined Paju Citizen.

On 19 July 2019, he announced his retirement from football on a Facebook post, ending his 22-years football career.

== Club career statistics ==
As of 16 July 2013

Club Performance		League		Cup		League Cup		Total				
South Korea		K League		KFA Cup		League Cup		Total				
Club	Season	Apps	Goals	Apps	Goals	Apps	Goals	Yellow card	(yellow card) (yellow-red card)	Red card	Apps	Goals
Jeonbuk Hyundai Motors	2007	0	0	0	0	2	0	0	0	0	2	0
Jeonbuk Hyundai Motors	2008	0	0	0	0	0	0	0	0	0	0	0
Club Performance		League		Cup		League Cup		Total				
Singapore		S. League		Singapore Cup		League Cup		Total				
Club	Season	Apps	Goals	Apps	Goals	Apps	Goals	Yellow card	(yellow card) (yellow-red card)	Red card	Apps	Goals
Super Reds FC	2009	12 (4)	4	0	0	0	0	0	0	0	12 (4)	4
Gombak United	2010	17 (6)	4	0 (1)	0	3	0	3	0	0	17 (7)	4
Gombak United	2011	32	10	2	1	3	1	3	0	0	37	12
Balestier Khalsa	2012	4 (2)	0	0	0	0	0	1	0	0	4 (2)	0
Woodlands Wellington	2013	17 (1)	6	0 (1)	0	4	2	1	0	0	21 (2)	8

All numbers encased in brackets signify substitute appearances.
