= Farouq Farkhan =

Singaporean footballer

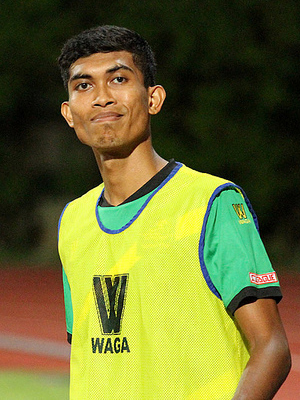
- Farouq Farkhan turning out for Woodlands Wellington in 2013.

Personal information
- Full name: Muhammad Farouq Farkhan bin Nashir
- Date of birth: June 6, 1988 (age 38)
- Place of birth: Singapore
- Height: 1.74 m (5 ft 9 in)
- Position: Midfielder

Team information
- Current team: Yishun Sentek Mariners
- Number: 17

Senior career*
Years	Team	Apps	(Gls)
2010–2012	Gombak United	2	(0)
2013 –2014	Woodlands Wellington	28	(1)
2015–2018	Tiong Bahru FC	63	(39)
2019–2019	Admiralty FC	8	(4)
2019–	Yishun Sentek Mariners	10	(11)
- * Club domestic league appearances and goals as of 27 April 2013

Farouq Farkhan (born 6 June 1988) is a Singaporean footballer who is currently playing for Yishun Sentek Mariners in the Singapore Football League.

He usually plays as a winger or wing back.

== Club career ==
Prior to joining the Rams, Farkhan was a member of Gombak United's Prime League team before signing an Sleague contract for the senior team in 2012.

On 31 January 2013, Woodlands Wellington announced that Farkhan has been confirmed after impressing the coaching panel as a trialist during Woodlands Wellington's round of pre-season friendlies.

Farkhan made his debut for the Rams against Tampines Rovers on 27 April 2013, where he scored a goal to mark his debut.

He then represent for Tiong Bahru Football Club (2015-2018) in Singapore NFL Div 1 and amateur league side Athletico CF.

Farouq signed for Admiralty FC before he left for Yishun Sentek Mariners of the NFL Div 1 in june 2019.

He currently wearing the no. 17 jersey at Yishun Sentek Mariners.

=== Club career statistics ===
As of 11 Jan 2020

Club Performance		League		Cup		League Cup		Total				
Singapore		S.League		Singapore Cup		League Cup		Total				
Club	Season	Apps	Goals	Apps	Goals	Apps	Goals	Yellow card	(yellow card) (yellow-red card)	Red card	Apps	Goals
Gombak United	2011	0 (2)	0	1	0	0 (2)	0	0	0	0	1 (4)	0
Gombak United	2012	0	0	0	0	0	0	0	0	0	0	0
Woodlands Wellington	2013-2014	28 (17)	1	0	0	1 (1)	0	0	0	0	29 (18)	1
Tiong Bahru Football Club	2015-2018	62 (16)	39	0	0	0 (0)	0	4	0	0	63 (16)	39
Admiralty Football Club	2019-2019	8 (0)	4	0	0	0 (0)	0	0	0	0	8 (0)	4
Yishun Sentek Mariners	2019-	6 (0)	6	0	0	4 (0)	5	3	0	0	8 (0)	11

All numbers encased in brackets signify substitute appearances.
