= Khalid Hamdaoui =

Dutch footballer (born 1981)

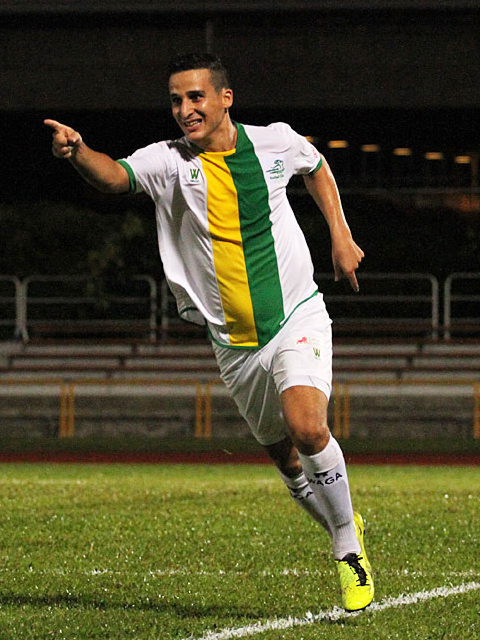
- Khalid Hamdaoui celebrates after scoring for Woodlands Wellington in the S.League against Warriors on 21 February 2013.

Personal information
- Date of birth: 30 July 1981 (age 45)
- Place of birth: Amsterdam, Netherlands
- Height: 1.78 m (5 ft 10 in)
- Position: Midfielder

Youth career
- 1990–1992: Overamstel
- 1992–1998: Ajax
- 1998–2000: AZ
- 2000–2001: NAC

Senior career*
Years	Team	Apps	(Gls)
2001–2002	Tokyo Verdy		
2002–2003	O Elvas		
2003–2005	MVV	0	(0)
2005–2006	Omniworld Amateurs		
2007	Dundee	4	(1)
2007–2008	Türkiyemspor		
2008–2010	Raja Casablanca	17	(6)
2013	Woodlands Wellington	12	(4)
2013–2014	Al-Nasr		

International career^{‡}
1996–2001	Netherlands Under-21	18	(5)
2000–2001	Netherlands (futsal)	29	(31)
- * Club domestic league appearances and goals as of 6 May 2013 ‡ National team caps and goals as of 27 August 2011

Khalid Hamdaoui (born 30 July 1981) is a Dutch retired footballer who played as a midfielder in 2013 for Woodlands Wellington in the S.League.

== Club career ==
=== Youth career in the Netherlands ===
Born and raised in Amsterdam, Khalid was discovered as a youth prodigy while playing for non-league side, SC Overamstel. He was then drafted into the prestigious Ajax Amsterdam youth academy where he played alongside Roy Makaay and Rafael van der Vaart.

Upon leaving the academy, Khalid subsequently spent 2 seasons each for Eredivisie sides AZ Alkmaar and NAC Breda.

=== Tokyo Verdy 1969 ===
In 2001, Hamdaoui made an important step to further his footballing career, travelling to Japan as an 18-year-old for trials.

The president of J.League side Tokyo Verdy 1969 was impressed by his Ajax Amsterdam background and he was offered him a contract.

Among Hamdaoui's colleagues in the Japanese team was the well-known Brazilian star Edmundo, who signed for Tokyo Verdy 1969 during the 2001 J. League Division 1 mid-season transfer window.

=== Dundee FC ===
After spending a year in the Portuguese Primeira Liga with O Elvas C.A.D. and another three seasons back home in the Netherlands with MVV Maastricht and FC Omniworld, Hamdaoui made the switch to Scottish First Division side, Dundee F.C. during the 2006–07 Scottish First Division season.

He made an impressive start for Dundee F.C. when he scored twice and created an assist for a teammate in a friendly match.

Hamdaoui's first goal in the Scottish First Division would come against Clyde FC on 17 February 2007. He would later leave the club and join ambitious Dutch amateur side Türkiyemspor.

=== Raja Casablanca ===
In 2008, Hamdaoui decided to trace his ancestral roots and move to Morocco.

He subsequently signed a contract with Raja Casablanca on 5 August 2008, one of the most celebrated football clubs of North Africa, and won a Botola championship medal with the Green Eagles during the 2008–09 season.

=== Woodlands Wellington ===
On 14 January 2013, S.League club, Woodlands Wellington, announced that it had captured the signing of Hamdaoui after the Dutchman had impressed the management during his trial with the club.

On 21 February 2013, Hamdaoui made his debut for the Rams in a home game against Warriors F.C. where he outshone Kazuyuki Toda by scoring one goal and assisting Moon Soon-Ho to another, helping the Rams draw the match with a 2 – 2 scoreline.

Khalid's six-month contract ended with the Rams in June 2013 and his contract was not extended. He played 12 league matches for Woodlands Wellington and scored 4 goals.

=== Al-Nasr SC ===
On 5 January 2014, Khalid Hamdaoui signed a 1-year contract with Al-Nasr SC (Salalah), from Qatar. "Khalid is the perfect player for the plans of Al-Nasr. They were looking for that kind of player", said Robert Cristian Trif, Hamdaoui's agent.

== Club career statistics ==
As of 6 June 2013

Singapore		S.League		Singapore Cup		League Cup		Total				
Club	Season	Apps	Goals	Apps	Goals	Apps	Goals	Yellow card	(yellow card) (yellow-red card)	Red card	Apps	Goals
Woodlands Wellington	2013	12	4	0 (1)	0	1	0	3	0	1	13 (1)	4

All numbers encased in brackets signify substitute appearances.

== Achievements ==
- Moroccan League: 2009

== Quotes about Hamdaoui ==
"He has terrific ability and craft" – Alex Rae, former Dundee F.C. coach.
