= Guntur Djafril =

Singaporean footballer

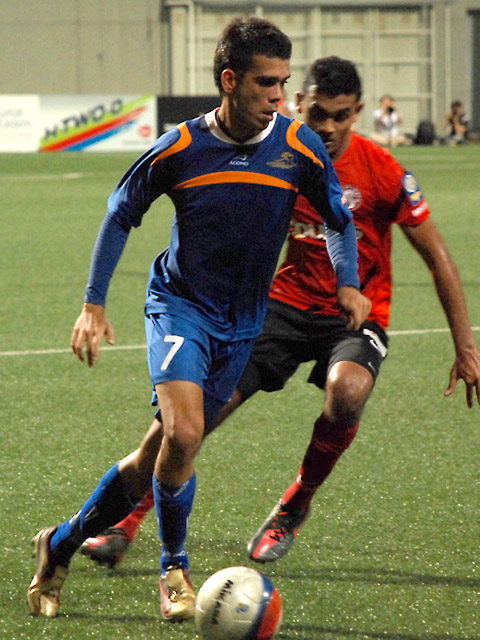
- Guntur Djafril in action for Woodlands Wellington in a S.League match against Courts Young Lions at Jalan Besar Stadium on 12 February 2012.

Personal information
- Full name: Guntur Bin Djafril
- Date of birth: 3 April 1985 (age 41)
- Place of birth: Singapore
- Height: 1.73 m (5 ft 8 in)
- Position: Striker

Team information
- Current team: Admiralty FC
- Number: 4

Youth career
- 2005: Paya Lebar Punggol FC
- 2006–2008: Geylang United

Senior career*
Years	Team	Apps	(Gls)
2009	Singapore Armed Forces FC	11	(0)
2010–2012	Woodlands Wellington FC	54	(2)
2013	Admiralty FC	1	(1)
2018 -	Siglap FC		
- * Club domestic league appearances and goals as of 4 November 2012

Guntur Djafril is a Singaporean professional soccer player who plays for Admiralty FC in the NFL Division 1, the second tier of football in Singapore. Before that he played for Woodlands Wellington FC in the S.League.

He played as a striker during his Prime League days but was deployed as a winger while playing for Woodlands Wellington FC.

== Club career ==
Djafril has previously played for S.League clubs Geylang United, Paya Lebar Punggol FC (now known as Hougang United and SAFFC) before joining Woodlands Wellington in the 2010 S.League season. He was the Captain cum top scorer when the Geylang Utd Prime League team lifted the Prime League Trophy in 2006.

He made his debut in Asia's premier club competition, the AFC Champions League, as a second-half substitute in a group stage match against Kashima Antlers on 7 April 2009 while playing for SAFFC.

On 23 November 2012, it was announced by Woodlands Wellington that he would not be retained for the 2013 season.

=== Club career statistics ===
As of 4 November 2012

Club Performance		League		Cup		League Cup		AFC Champions League		Total				
Singapore		S.League		Singapore Cup		League Cup		AFC Champions League		Total				
Club	Season	Apps	Goals	Apps	Goals	Apps	Goals	Apps	Goals	Yellow card	(yellow card) (yellow-red card)	Red card	Apps	Goals
SAFFC	2009	1 (10)	0	0	0	0	0	0 (1)	0	0	0	0	1 (11)	0
Woodlands Wellington	2010	10 (14)	0	1	0	0 (2)	0	-	-	1	0	0	11 (16)	0
Woodlands Wellington	2011	10 (1)	1	0	0	1	0	-	-	3	0	0	11 (1)	1
Woodlands Wellington	2012	17 (2)	1	0	0	1 (1)	0	-	-	1	0	0	18 (3)	1

All numbers encased in brackets signify substitute appearances.
