= Atsushi Shimono =

Japanese footballer

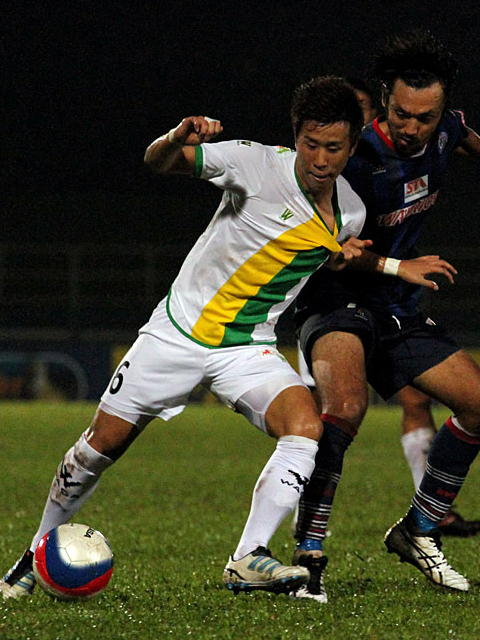
- Atsushi Shimono (in white) turning out for Woodlands Wellington and tussling for the ball with Warriors F.C. marquee signing, Kazuyuki Toda (in dark blue), during a S.League match on February 21, 2013.

Personal information
- Full name: Atsushi Shimono
- Date of birth: April 27, 1988 (age 38)
- Place of birth: Kanagawa, Japan
- Height: 1.70 m (5 ft 7 in)
- Position: Midfielder

Team information
- Current team: Hang Yuen

Youth career
- Midorino SSS
- Yamato Mateus
- Tsukimino Secondary School
- Yamato Minami High School
- JAPAN Soccer College

Senior career*
Years	Team	Apps	(Gls)
2009–2012	Albirex Niigata Singapore	111	(9)
2013–2014	Woodlands Wellington	46	(2)
2015	Hougang United	0	(0)
2017–2018	JPV Marikina F.C.	0	(0)
2019	Zwekapin United	10	(0)
2020–	Hang Yuen	50	(3)
- * Club domestic league appearances and goals as of 28 September 2020

Atsushi Shimono (下野 淳, Shimono Atsushi; born April 27, 1988) is a Japanese football player.

He has played for Albirex Niigata Singapore FC, Woodlands Wellington and Hougang United FC in the S.League, primarily as a defensive midfielder. He can also operate effectively as a deep-lying playmaker.

Shimono is known for his distribution of the ball and technical ability. In recognition of his talent, he was named in the starting lineup of The New Paper's 2012 S.League team of the year.

== Club career ==
A school team player for his alma maters Tsukimino Secondary School and Yamato Minami High School, Shimono's ability was recognized when he was one of several young players drafted into Albirex Niigata (S)'s squad during the 2009 S.League, along with Kenji Adachihara, Ryuta Hayashi and Takasuke Goto, while he was playing for the Japan Soccer College in the Hokushin'etsu Football League. This was made possible due to Japan Soccer College's official affiliation with Albirex Niigata (S)'s parent club, Albirex Niigata, and its players are often selected to turn out for the satellite Albirex Niigata (S) squad in the S.League.

Shimono made his debut in 2009 for the White Swans under then-Albirex coach, Naoki Naruo, in a match against Geylang United on 17 February 2009 which the Eagles won with a 3–1 scoreline.

To date, Shimono has played a total of 110 matches in the S.League for Albirex Niigata (S), and an additional 20 matches in domestic cup competitions like the Singapore Cup and League Cup.

On 7 December 2012, it was announced that Shimono had completed his transfer from Albirex Niigata (S) to Woodlands Wellington.

He made his debut for Woodlands Wellington on 21 February 2013 in a 2–2 draw against Warriors F.C. and scored his first goal for Woodlands Wellington incidentally in the reverse fixture against the Warriors on 25 May 2013.

=== Club Career Statistics ===
As of 16 July 2013

Atsushi Shimono's Profile

Club Performance		League		Cup		League Cup		Total				
Singapore		S.League		Singapore Cup		League Cup		Total				
Club	Season	Apps	Goals	Apps	Goals	Apps	Goals	Yellow card	(yellow card) (yellow-red card)	Red card	Apps	Goals
Albirex Niigata (S)	2009	16 (9)	1	0	0	0	0	2	0	0	16 (9)	1
Albirex Niigata (S)	2010	30	2	3	0	1	0	9	0	0	34	2
Albirex Niigata (S)	2011	27 (4)	3	6	1	4	0	2	0	0	37 (4)	4
Albirex Niigata (S)	2012	24	2	3	0	3	1	3	0	0	30	3
Woodlands Wellington	2013	17	1	1	0	4	0	1	0	0	22	1

All numbers encased in brackets signify substitute appearances.

== Honours ==
=== Club ===
Singapore League Cup

- 2011: Champions
