= Farizal Basri =

Singaporean footballer

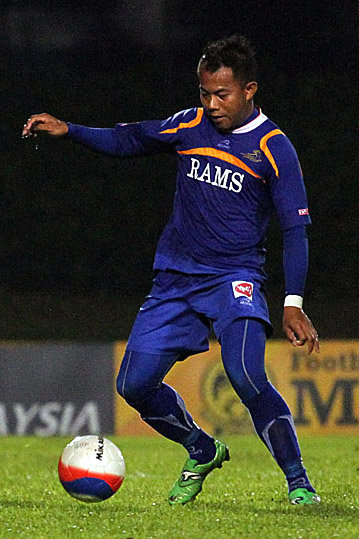
- Farizal Basri in action for Woodlands Wellington in a S.League against Harimau Muda at Yishun Stadium on 15 April 2012.

Personal information
- Full name: Muhammad Farizal bin Basri
- Date of birth: 4 September 1981 (age 45)
- Place of birth: Singapore
- Height: 1.67 m (5 ft 5 1/2 in)
- Position: Midfielder

Senior career*
| Years | Team | Apps | (Gls) |
| 2002 | Tampines Rovers | | |
| 2004 | Young Lions | 24 | (5) |
| 2005 | Tampines Rovers | 2 | (0) |
| 2006 | SAFFC | 11 | (3) |
| 2007 | Balestier Khalsa | 50 | (3) |
| 2008 | Geylang United | 10 | (0) |
| 2009–2010 | Sengkang Punggol | 52 | (3) |
| 2011 | Home United | 6 | (0) |
| 2012–2014 | Woodlands Wellington | 30 | (0) |
- * Club domestic league appearances and goals as of 25 May 2013

Muhammad Farizal bin Basri is a retired professional midfielder who last plays for Woodlands Wellington in the S-League, joining them in early 2012 in time for the 2012 S.League.

== Playing career ==
Farizal appearances for three S-League clubs, Sengkang Punggol, Home United and Woodlands Wellington between 2009 and 2012 have earned him the "journeyman" tag amongst journalists and pundits alike. He has also played for Tampines Rovers and Young Lions during his career.

Farizal initially started off as a defender for the Young Lions and his solid performances at the back earned him a call-up to the national squad in 2004.

He usually plays behind the front two, offering support from midfield. He is considered by many to be a natural playmaker.

== Career statistics ==
As of 11 June 2013

Farizal Basri's Profile

| Club Performance | | League | | Cup | | League Cup | | Total | |
| Singapore | | S.League | | Singapore Cup | | League Cup | | Total | |
| Club | Season | Apps | Goals | Apps | Goals | Apps | Goals | Apps | Goals |
|---|---|---|---|---|---|---|---|---|---|
| Geylang United | 2008 | 10 | 0 | 1 | 0 | 1 | 0 | 12 | 0 |
| Geylang United | Total | 10 | 0 | 1 | 0 | 1 | 0 | 12 | 0 |
| Sengkang Punggol | 2009 | 22 | 1 | 0 | 0 | 0 | 0 | 22 | 1 |
| Sengkang Punggol | 2010 | 30 | 2 | 1 | 0 | 0 | 0 | 31 | 2 |
| Sengkang Punggol | Total | 52 | 3 | 1 | 0 | 0 | 0 | 53 | 3 |
| Home United | 2011 | 6 | 0 | 0 | 0 | 1 | 0 | 7 | 0 |
| Home United | Total | 6 | 0 | 0 | 0 | 1 | 0 | 7 | 0 |
| Woodlands Wellington | 2012 | 20 | 0 | 1 | 0 | 2 | 0 | 23 | 0 |
| Woodlands Wellington | 2013 | 10 | 0 | 1 | 0 | 2 | 0 | 13 | 0 |
| Woodlands Wellington | Total | 30 | 0 | 2 | 0 | 4 | 0 | 36 | 0 |
| Career Total | | 98 | 3 | 4 | 0 | 6 | 0 | 108 | 3 |

All numbers encased in brackets signify substitute appearances.

== Honours ==
=== SAFFC ===
- S.League: 2006
