= Park Kang-jin =

South Korean footballer

Park Kang-Jin
Personal information
- Full name: Park Kang-Jin
- Date of birth: 9 August 1988 (age 38)
- Place of birth: South Korea
- Height: 1.80 m (5 ft 11 in)
- Position: Midfielder

Senior career*
Years	Team	Apps	(Gls)
2008–2009	Super Reds FC	27	(10)
2010–2011	Gombak United	61	(7)
2012–2014	Balestier Khalsa	44	(11)
Total		132	(28)
- * Club domestic league appearances and goals as of 22:30, 02 August 2017 UTC

Park Kang-Jin (born 9 August 1988) is a South Korean association footballer.

== Career ==
He signed for former S.League club Super Reds FC when he was just 19, playing two seasons before the club was dissolved.

His debut for Balestier Khalsa after signing from Gombak United for the 2012 S.League came against Tampines Rovers in a 1–0 win during the opening round of the season.

== Honours ==
Balestier Khalsa

- Singapore Cup: 2014
- League Cup: 2013
