= Moon Soon-ho =

South Korean footballer

Moon Soon-Ho
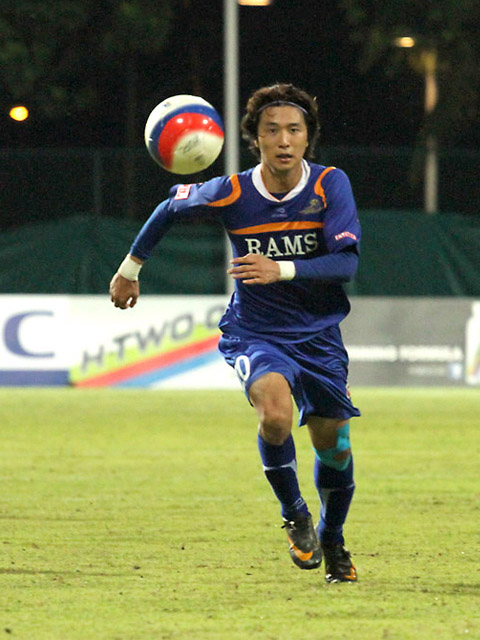
- Moon Soon-Ho in action for Woodlands Wellington in a S.League during the 2012 season.

Personal information
- Date of birth: 15 March 1981 (age 45)
- Place of birth: Seongnam, South Korea
- Height: 1.72 m (5 ft 7 1/2 in)
- Position: Striker

Team information
- Current team: Woodlands Wellington FC
- Number: 10

Senior career*
Years	Team	Apps	(Gls)
2004–2007	Incheon Korail	28	(8)
2008	Super Reds	9	(6)
2009–2010	Cheonan City	16	(5)
2011–2014	Woodlands Wellington	95	(42)
- * Club domestic league appearances and goals as of 1 July 2020

- Moon Soon-ho
- Hangul: 문순호
- RR: Mun Sunho
- MR: Mun Sunho

Moon Soon-Ho (born 15 March 1981) is a South Korean former football player who last plays for Woodlands Wellington in the S-League.

== Club career ==
=== Super Reds ===
Having finished last in the 2007 S-League season, Super Reds made several changes to their squad and Moon, along with his Incheon Korail team-mate Choi Young-Min, were signed up from the Korea National League side for the 2008 S-League season.

Moon scored a total of seven goals during that season, netting crucial match winning goals against Gombak United and Courts Young Lions.

In 2009, Moon decided to move back to his native South Korea to join Korea National League side Cheonan City.

=== Cheonan City ===
With a knee injury hampering him during his time back in the Korea National League, Moon had little playing time at Cheonan. However, he managed to score 2 goals during his maiden season in 2009 despite spending most of his time on the sidelines. He was deployed mostly as a substitute. He finish his season with 2 goals in 6 appearances for the club. In his second season with Cheonan, Moon did make an impact by coming off the bench to score a stunner for Cheonan against Yongin City on 30 April 2010. His knack for scoring goals when coming on as a substitute earned him the title "super-sub".

At the end of the 2010 Korea National League season, despite scoring 3 goals in 10 appearances, Moon was released by the club as he struggled to recover from his injury.

=== Woodlands Wellington ===
Moon would soon return to the S.League when he was snapped up by Woodlands Wellington during the 2011 mid-season transfer window as a free agent. Joining him at the club was fellow Korean Hyun Jong-Woon, whom switched to the Rams from Tanjong Pagar United.

Moon proved to be a shrewd signing for Woodlands, as he scored 8 goals in the latter half of the season and finished the 2011 season as Woodlands' top scorer.

Moon kick-started the 2012 S-League season in great fashion, earning a penalty against the favoured Courts Young Lions and calmly slotting it home in the 48th minute, putting the Rams into the lead and ultimately winning the game for them.

Moon's telepathic understanding with Lebanense attacking midfielder Hussein Akil has also been praised by football pundits, despite the pair only playing together at the start of the 2012 season.

Moon finished as Woodlands Wellington's top scorer for the Rams' 2012 S.League season with 9 goals in the S-League and 1 goal in the Singapore Cup, which he scored against Kanbawza.

In the 2013 S.League season, Moon finished as joint-top scorer in the S.League with 15 league goals alongside Aleksandar Đurić. Moon built up a telepathic relationship with fellow Korean striker Jang Jo-Yoon as the Rams stormed to a top-six finish. Moon's fantastic performances also earned him a spot in the inaugural Goal.com Singapore Football Awards' Team of the Year.

== Club statistics ==
As of 30 October 2014

Moon Soon-Ho's Profile

Club Performance		League		Cup		League Cup		Total				
Singapore		S.League		Singapore Cup		League Cup		Total				
Club	Season	Apps	Goals	Apps	Goals	Apps	Goals	Yellow card	(yellow card) (yellow-red card)	Red card	Apps	Goals
Woodlands Wellington	2011	15 (3)	8	0	0	1 (0)	0	2	0	0	16 (3)	8
Woodlands Wellington	2012	23 (1)	9	1	0	3 (0)	1	1	0	0	27 (1)	10
Woodlands Wellington	2013	25 (1)	15	1	0	4 (1)	1	3	1	0	30 (2)	16
Woodlands Wellington	2014	24 (3)	4	1	0	3 (0)	0	2	0	0	27 (3)	4

All numbers encased in brackets signify substitute appearances.

== Honours ==
=== Individual ===
- S.League Top Scorer: 2013
