= 2016 Home United FC season =

Home United
2016 season
- Chairman: Anselm Lopez
- Head coach: Philippe Aw
- Stadium: Bishan Stadium
- S.League: 4th
- Singapore Cup: Quarter-finals
- Top goalscorer: League: Ken Ilsø (11 goals); All: Ken Ilsø (13 goals)
| Home colours | Away colours |

The 2016 season was Home United's 21st consecutive season in the top flight of Singapore football and in the S.League. Along with the S.League, the club also competed in the Prime League, the Singapore Cup and the Singapore League Cup.

== Club ==
=== Coaching staff ===
| Position | Staff |
|---|---|
| S.League Head Coach | (Singapore) Philippe Aw |
| S.League Assistant Coach; Prime League Head Coach | (Singapore) Robin Chitrakar |
| S.League Assistant Coach | (France) Steve Vilmiaire |
| Team Manager | (Singapore) Badri Ghent |
| Technical Director | (France) Steve Vilmiaire |
| Technical Director | (Algeria) Adlane Messelem |
| Goalkeeper Coach | (Singapore) Adi Saleh |
| Head of Sports Performance | (Germany) Dirk Schauenberg |
| Sports Trainer | (Philippines) Daisyree Anarna |
| Logistics Officer | (Singapore) Mohd Zahir |
| Prime League Team Manager | (Singapore) Bernard Lan |
| Under-17 Head Coach | (Singapore) Fadzuhasny Juraimi |
| Under-17 Head Coach | (Singapore) Syed Azmir |
| Under-15 Head Coach | (Singapore) Syed Karim |
| Under-15 Head Coach | (Singapore) Yahya Madon |

Source: Home United FC

=== Other information ===
| Chairman | (Singapore) Anselm Lopez |
| Chief Executive | (Singapore) Azrulnizam Shah |

Source: Home United FC

== Squad information ==
=== S.League squad ===
As of 19 March 2016.

| Squad No. | Name | Nationality | Position(s) | Date of birth (age) |
Goalkeepers
| 1 | Hyrulnizam Juma'at | (Singapore) | GK | 14 November 1986 (age 40) |
| 13 | Zulfairuuz Rudy | (Singapore) | GK | 22 May 1994 (age 32) |
| 22 | Eko Pradana Putra | (Singapore) | GK | 14 April 1993 (age 33) |
Defenders
| 2 | Redzwan Atan | (Singapore) | DF | 7 October 1990 (age 36) |
| 4 | Juma'at Jantan | (Singapore) | DF | 23 February 1984 (age 42) |
| 5 | R Aaravin | (Singapore) | DF | 24 February 1996 (age 30) |
| 6 | Abdil Qaiyyim Mutalib | (Singapore) | DF | 14 May 1989 (age 37) |
| 11 | Sirina Camara | (France) | DF | 12 April 1991 (age 35) |
| 15 | Luqman Ismail | (Singapore) | DF | 4 March 1994 (age 32) |
| 16 | Sim Teck Yi | (Singapore) | DF | 30 November 1991 (age 34) |
| 18 | Shahrin Saberin | (Singapore) | DF | 5 August 1994 (age 32) |
| 19 | Sufianto Salleh | (Singapore) | DF | 9 February 1993 (age 33) |
| 25 | Ang Zhiwei | (Singapore) | DF | 2 August 1989 (age 37) |
Midfielders
| 3 | Song Ui-young | (South Korea) | MF | 8 November 1993 (age 33) |
| 7 | Aqhari Abdullah | (Singapore) | MF | 9 July 1991 (age 35) |
| 8 | Azhar Sairudin | (Singapore) | MF | 30 September 1986 (age 40) |
| 14 | Shamil Sharif | (Singapore) | MF | 8 May 1992 (age 34) |
| 17 | Mahathir Azeman | (Singapore) | MF | 17 January 1996 (age 30) |
| 23 | Zulfahmi Arifin | (Singapore) | MF | 5 October 1991 (age 35) |
| 24 | Syahiran Miswan | (Singapore) | MF | 22 January 1994 (age 32) |
Strikers
| 9 | Ken Ilsø | (Denmark) | FW | 2 November 1986 (age 40) |
| 10 | Faris Ramli | (Singapore) | FW | 24 August 1992 (age 34) |
| 12 | Nur Hizami Salim | (Singapore) | FW | 11 April 1994 (age 32) |
| 20 | Khairul Nizam | (Singapore) | FW | 25 June 1991 (age 35) |
| 21 | Irfan Fandi | (Singapore) | FW | 13 August 1997 (age 29) |

== Transfers ==
=== In ===
| No. | Pos | Player | Transferred From | Date | Source |
|---|---|---|---|---|---|
| 16 | DF | (Singapore) Sim Teck Yi | (Singapore) Young Lions | 17 December 2015 | |
| 10 | FW | (Singapore) Faris Ramli | (Singapore) LionsXII | 22 December 2015 | |
| 23 | MF | (Singapore) Zulfahmi Arifin | (Singapore) LionsXII | 22 December 2015 | |
| 7 | MF | (Singapore) Aqhari Abdullah | (Singapore) Tampines Rovers | 25 December 2015 | |
| 14 | MF | (Singapore) Shamil Sharif | (Singapore) Young Lions | 28 December 2015 | |
| 20 | FW | (Singapore) Khairul Nizam | (Singapore) LionsXII | 4 January 2016 | |
| 21 | FW | (Singapore) Irfan Fandi | (Singapore) Young Lions | 5 January 2016 | |
| — | FW | (Singapore) Ikhsan Fandi | (Singapore) Young Lions | 7 January 2016 | |

=== Out ===
| No. | Pos | Player | Transferred To | Date | Source |
|---|---|---|---|---|---|
| — | MF | (Singapore) Fazli Ayob | (Singapore) Balestier Khalsa | December 2015 | |
| — | FW | (Singapore) Masrezwan Masturi | Retiring | December 2015 | |
| — | MF | (Singapore) Stanely Ng | (Singapore) Geylang International | December 2015 | |
| — | DF | (Singapore) Noh Rahman | (Singapore) Tampines Rovers | December 2015 | |
| — | FW | (Algeria) Kamel Ramdani | (France) GSI Pontivy | December 2015 | |
| — | GK | (Singapore) Shahril Jantan | Retiring | December 2015 | |
| — | MF | (Singapore) Yasir Hanapi | (Singapore) Tampines Rovers | December 2015 | |

== Pre-season friendlies ==
| 27 January 2016 | Army United (Thailand) | 2–1 | (Singapore) Home United | Saraburi, Thailand |
| 16:00 UTC+07:00 | | | | Stadium: Saraburi Province Central Stadium |

| 29 January 2016 | Air Force Central (Thailand) | 2–1 | (Singapore) Home United | Ayutthaya, Thailand |
| 17:00 UTC+07:00 | | | | Stadium: Ayutthaya Stadium |

| 31 January 2016 | Osotspa Samut Prakan (Thailand) | 0–0 | (Singapore) Home United | Rangsit, Pathum Thani, Thailand |
| 16:00 UTC+07:00 | | | | Stadium: Tanarom Village |

| 27 January 2016 | Home United (Singapore) | 11–0 | (Singapore) Police SA | Bishan, Singapore |
| 16:00 UTC+07:00 | | | | Stadium: Bishan Stadium |

== Team statistics ==
=== Appearances and goals ===
Numbers in parentheses denote appearances as substitute.

| No. | Pos. | Player | Sleague | | League Cup | | Singapore Cup | | Total | |
| No. | Pos. | Player | Apps. | Goals | Apps. | Goals | Apps. | Goals | Apps. | Goals |
|---|---|---|---|---|---|---|---|---|---|---|
| 1 | GK | (Singapore) Hyrulnizam Juma'at | 10 | 0 | 4 | 0 | 0 | 0 | 14 | 0 |
| 2 | DF | (Singapore) Redzwan Atan | 3(4) | 0 | 3 | 0 | 3 | 0 | 13 | 0 |
| 3 | MF | (South Korea) Song Ui-young | 19 | 5 | 3(1) | 1 | 1 | 0 | 24 | 6 |
| 4 | DF | (Singapore) Juma'at Jantan | 20 | 2 | 4 | 0 | 1 | 0 | 25 | 2 |
| 5 | DF | (Singapore) R Aaravin | 0 | 0 | 0 | 0 | 0 | 0 | 0 | 0 |
| 6 | DF | (Singapore) Abdil Qaiyyim Mutalib | 18(1) | 0 | 0 | 0 | 3 | 0 | 22 | 0 |
| 7 | MF | (Singapore) Aqhari Abdullah | 14(3) | 0 | 4 | 0 | 1 | 0 | 22 | 0 |
| 8 | MF | (Singapore) Azhar Sairudin | 21(1) | 2 | 0 | 0 | 3 | 1 | 25 | 3 |
| 9 | FW | (Denmark) Ken Ilso | 22 | 19 | 4 | 2 | 3 | 2 | 29 | 23 |
| 10 | MF | (Singapore) Faris Ramli | 12(3) | 5 | 0 | 0 | 1 | 0 | 16 | 5 |
| 11 | DF | (France) Sirina Camara | 21 | 1 | 2 | 0 | 1 | 0 | 24 | 1 |
| 12 | DF | (Singapore) Haziq Azman | 5(1) | 1 | 4 | 0 | 0(1) | 0 | 11 | 1 |
| 13 | GK | (Singapore) Zulfairuuz Rudy | 8(1) | 0 | 0 | 0 | 3 | 0 | 12 | 0 |
| 14 | MF | (Singapore) Shamil Sharif | 16(4) | 2 | 4 | 2 | 2 | 1 | 26 | 5 |
| 15 | DF | (Singapore) Luqman Ismail | 0 | 0 | 0 | 0 | 0 | 0 | 0 | 0 |
| 16 | DF | (Singapore) Sim Teck Yi | 4(2) | 0 | 3 | 0 | 0 | 0 | 9 | 0 |
| 17 | MF | (Singapore) Mahathir Azeman | 0(7) | 0 | 0(3) | 0 | 0(1) | 0 | 11 | 0 |
| 18 | DF | (Singapore) Shahrin Saberin | 17(1) | 1 | 0 | 2 | 0 | 0 | 20 | 1 |
| 19 | DF | (Singapore) Sufianto Salleh | 2(6) | 0 | 2(1) | 0 | 0(1) | 0 | 12 | 0 |
| 20 | FW | (Malaysia) Amirul Naim Shahruddin | 12(7) | 5 | 0 | 0 | 1(2) | 2 | 22 | 7 |
| 21 | DF | (Singapore) Irfan Fandi | 2(6) | 2 | 0 | 0 | 0 | 0 | 8 | 2 |
| 22 | GK | (Singapore) Eko Pradana Putra | 6 | 0 | 0 | 0 | 0 | 0 | 6 | 0 |
| 23 | MF | (Singapore) Zulfahmi Arifin | 15(5) | 1 | 0 | 2(1) | 0 | 0 | 23 | 1 |
| 24 | MF | (Singapore) Syahiran Miswan | 8(6) | 1 | 4 | 0 | 3 | 0 | 21 | 1 |
| 25 | DF | (Singapore) Ang Zhiwei | 0(1) | 0 | 0 | 0 | 0 | 0 | 1 | 0 |
| 26 | FW | (Singapore) Ikhsan Fandi | 0(4) | 0 | 0 | 0 | 0 | 0 | 4 | 0 |
| 27 | MF | (France) Ambroise Begue | 9 | 1 | 2 | 0 | 2 | 0 | 13 | 1 |
| 29 | FW | (Singapore) Amir Zailani | 0(4) | 0 | 0(1) | 0 | 0(1) | 0 | 6 | 0 |
| 34 | DF | (Singapore) Yeo Hai Ngee | 0 | 0 | 0(3) | 1 | 0 | 0 | 3 | 1 |
| 35 | DF | (Singapore) Lionel Tan | 0 | 0 | 1(2) | 0 | 0 | 0 | 3 | 0 |
| 43 | FW | (Singapore) Amiruldin Asraf | 0(1) | 0 | 0 | 0 | 0 | 0 | 1 | 0 |

== Competitions ==
=== Overall ===
| Competition | Started round | Current position / round | Final position / round | First match | Last match |
|---|---|---|---|---|---|
| S.League | — | 4th | | 14 February 2016 | |
| Singapore Cup | Preliminary round | — | Quarter-finals | 26 May 2016 | 30 June 2016 |
| Singapore League Cup | — | — | | | |

Updated to match played 30 June 2016
Source: Competitions

=== Overview ===
| Competition | Record | | | | | | | |
| Competition | G | W | D | L | GF | GA | GD | Win % |
|---|---|---|---|---|---|---|---|---|
| S.League | 16 | 6 | 4 | 6 | 29 | 28 | +1 | 37.50 |
| Singapore Cup | 3 | 1 | 1 | 1 | 5 | 5 | +0 | 33.33 |
| League Cup | 0 | 0 | 0 | 0 | 0 | 0 | +0 | — |
| Total | 19 | 7 | 5 | 7 | 34 | 33 | +1 | 36.84 |

Updated to match played 30 June 2016
Source: Competitions

=== S.League ===
==== League table ====
| Pos | Team | Pld | W | D | L | GF | GA | GD | Pts | Qualification |
|---|---|---|---|---|---|---|---|---|---|---|
| 2 | Tampines Rovers | 24 | 15 | 4 | 5 | 50 | 28 | +22 | 49 | Qualification to AFC Champions League Preliminary Round 1 or AFC Cup Group Stage |
| 3 | (Brunei) DPMM FC (Note: The two foreign clubs – Albirex Niigata (S) and DPMM FC – as well as the Football Association of Singapore (FAS) under-21 team, Young Lions, are not eligible for any AFC competition spots.) | 24 | 12 | 5 | 7 | 47 | 37 | +10 | 41 | |
| 4 | Home United | 24 | 11 | 4 | 9 | 50 | 42 | +8 | 37 | Qualification to AFC Cup Play-off Round |
| 5 | Geylang International | 24 | 10 | 7 | 7 | 35 | 29 | +6 | 37 | |
| 6 | Hougang United | 24 | 9 | 5 | 10 | 35 | 39 | −4 | 32 | |

Updated to match(es) played on 31 October 2016. Source: S.League
Rules for classification: 1) points; 2) goal difference; 3) number of goals scored; 4) number of wins

==== Matches ====
Win Draw Loss Upcoming fixture

| 14 February 1 | Home United | 2–2 | Warriors | Bishan, Singapore |
| 19:30 UTC+08:00 | Khairul 17'; Camara 82' | Details | Béhé 35' (pen.); Fazli 90+1' | Stadium: Bishan Stadium; Attendance: 1,756; Referee: Farhad Mohd |

| 18 February 2 | Hougang United | 1–0 | Home United | Hougang, Singapore |
| 19:30 UTC+08:00 | Plazibat 34' | Details | | Stadium: Hougang Stadium; Attendance: 2,307; Referee: Jansen Foo |

| 3 March 3 | Home United | 1–1 | Tampines Rovers | Bishan, Singapore |
| 19:30 UTC+08:00 | Ilsø 25' | Details | Pennant 40' | Stadium: Bishan Stadium; Attendance: 3,551; Referee: Muhd Taqi |

| 11 March 4 | Brunei DPMM | 2–1 | Home United | Bandar Seri Begawan, Brunei |
| 20:15 UTC+08:00 | Ramazotti 35' (pen.); Azwan 72' | Details | Begue 19' | Stadium: Hassanal Bolkiah National Stadium; Referee: W. Ravisanthiran |

| 17 March 5 | Home United | 4–1 | Garena Young Lions | Bishan, Singapore |
| 19:30 UTC+08:00 | Ilsø 18'; Zulfahmi 31'; Khairul 50', 83' | Details | Fareez 11' | Stadium: Bishan Stadium; Attendance: 2,048; Referee: Jansen Foo |

| 1 April 6 | Balestier Khalsa | 0–1 | Home United | Toa Payoh, Singapore |
| 19:30 UTC+08:00 | | Details | Ilsø 34' (pen.) | Stadium: Toa Payoh Stadium; Referee: Sukhbir Singh |

| 8 April 7 | Home United | 0–3 | Albirex Niigata (S) | Kallang, Singapore |
| 19:45 UTC+08:00 | | Details | Kawata 47', 71', 89' | Stadium: Jalan Besar Stadium; Referee: Farhad Mohd |

| 15 April 8 | Geylang International | 2–2 | Home United | Kallang, Singapore |
| 19:45 UTC+08:00 | Ng 24'; Amy 46' | Details | Ilsø 15'; Al-Qaasimy 39' (o.g.) | Stadium: Jalan Besar Stadium; Referee: Jansen Foo |

| 22 April 9 | Warriors | 1–2 | Home United | Kallang, Singapore |
| 19:45 UTC+08:00 | Béhé 63' | Details | Song 20'; Ilsø 85' | Stadium: Jalan Besar Stadium; Attendance: 2,308; Referee: Nathan Chan |

| 29 April 10 | Home United | 3–2 | Hougang United | Kallang, Singapore |
| 19:45 UTC+08:00 | Ilsø 16'; Song 28'; Faris 78' | Details | Plazibat 41' (pen.); Raihan 86' | Stadium: Jalan Besar Stadium |

| 13 May 11 | Tampines Rovers | 1–2 | Home United | Kallang, Singapore |
| 19:45 UTC+08:00 | Fazrul 22' | Details | Azhar 24'; Ilsø 70' | Stadium: Jalan Besar Stadium; Attendance: 2,099; Referee: Farhad Mohd |

| 19 May 12 | Home United | 5–0 | Brunei DPMM | Bishan, Singapore |
| 19:30 UTC+08:00 | Azhar 10'; Faris 39'; Ilsø 69', 73'; Syahiran 84' | Details | | Stadium: Bishan Stadium; Referee: Muhd Taqi |

| 11 June 13 | Garena Young Lions | 2–2 | Home United | Kallang, Singapore |
| 20:00 UTC+08:00 | Khairul A. 22'; Firdaus 49' | Details | Khairul N. 53'; Ilsø 90' | Stadium: Jalan Besar Stadium; Referee: G. Letchman |

| 14 June 14 | Home United | 1–3 | Balestier Khalsa | Bishan, Singapore |
| 20:00 UTC+08:00 | Faris 53' | Details | Zulkiffli 45'; Smajović 65'; Jamil 75' | Stadium: Bishan Stadium; Referee: Muhd Taqi |

| 18 June 15 | Albirex Niigata (S) | 5–2 | Home United | Jurong East, Singapore |
| 20:00 UTC+08:00 | Inui 3', 45'; Kawata 59'; Nagasaki 86', 87' | Details | Ilsø 79' (pen.); Khairul 81' | Stadium: Jurong East Stadium; Referee: Ahmad A'Qashah |

| 23 June 16 | Home United | 1–2 | Geylang International | Bishan, Singapore |
| 20:00 UTC+08:00 | Shahrin 50' | Details | Sahil 89'; Quak 90' | Stadium: Bishan Stadium; Referee: Farhad Mohd |

| 4 August 17 | Home United | 3–0 | Warriors | Bishan, Singapore |
| 19:30 UTC+08:00 | Ken Ilsø 38' 89'; Song Ui-young 64' | | | Stadium: Bishan Stadium |

| 12 August 18 | Hougang United | v | Home United | Kallang, Singapore |
| 19:45 UTC+08:00 | | | | Stadium: Jalan Besar Stadium |

| 25 August 19 | Home United | v | Tampines Rovers | Bishan, Singapore |
| 19:30 UTC+08:00 | | | | Stadium: Bishan Stadium |

| 23 September 20 | Brunei DPMM | v | Home United | Bandar Seri Begawan, Brunei |
| 20:15 UTC+08:00 | | | | Stadium: Hassanal Bolkiah National Stadium |

| 29 September 21 | Home United | v | Garena Young Lions | Bishan, Singapore |
| 19:30 UTC+08:00 | | | | Stadium: Bishan Stadium |

| 15 October 22 | Balestier Khalsa | v | Home United | Toa Payoh, Singapore |
| 19:30 UTC+08:00 | | | | Stadium: Toa Payoh Stadium |

| 20 October 23 | Home United | v | Albirex Niigata (S) | Bishan, Singapore |
| 19:30 UTC+08:00 | | | | Stadium: Bishan Stadium |

| 27 October 24 | Geylang International | v | Home United | Bedok, Singapore |
| 19:30 UTC+08:00 | | | | Stadium: Bedok Stadium |

=== Singapore Cup ===
Win Draw Loss Upcoming fixture

==== Preliminary round ====
| 26 May Preliminary round | Home United (Singapore) | 2–1 | (Singapore) Hougang United | Bishan, Singapore |
| 19:30 UTC+08:00 | Azhar 48'; Ilsø 90' | Details | Kogure 58' | Stadium: Bishan Stadium; Referee: G. Letchman |

==== Quarter-finals ====
| 27 June First leg | Balestier Khalsa (Singapore) | 2–1 | (Singapore) Home United | Toa Payoh, Singapore |
| 20:00 UTC+08:00 | Tokić 36'; Ahmad 86' | Details | Khairul 59' | Stadium: Toa Payoh Stadium; Referee: W. Ravisanthiran |

| 30 June Second leg | Home United (Singapore) | 2–2 (3–4 agg.) | (Singapore) Balestier Khalsa | Bishan, Singapore |
| 20:00 UTC+08:00 | Khairul 11'; Ilsø 55' | Details | Tokić 34', 59' | Stadium: Bishan Stadium; Referee: Jansen Foo |

=== League Cup ===
==== Group stage ====
| Pos | Team | Pld | W | D | L | GF | GA | GD | Pts | Qualification |
|---|---|---|---|---|---|---|---|---|---|---|
| 1 | Albirex Niigata (S) | 3 | 2 | 0 | 1 | 4 | 1 | +3 | 6 | Advance to semi-final |
| 2 | Home United | 3 | 1 | 1 | 1 | 7 | 4 | +3 | 4 | Advance to semi-final |
| 3 | Geylang International | 3 | 1 | 1 | 1 | 3 | 7 | −4 | 4 | |
| 4 | Balestier Khalsa | 3 | 0 | 2 | 1 | 4 | 6 | −2 | 2 | |

Source: S.League
