= 2015 Home United FC season =

Home United
2015 season
- Chairman: Anselm Lopez
- Head coach: Philippe Aw
- Stadium: Bishan Stadium

The 2015 season was Home United's 20th consecutive season in the top flight of Singapore football and in the S.League. Along with the S.League, the club also competed in the Prime League, the Singapore Cup and the Singapore League Cup.

== Squad ==
=== S.League squad ===
Squad No.	Name	Nationality	Date of birth (age)	Last club
Goalkeepers
1	Hyrulnizam Juma'at	(Singapore)	14 November 1986 (age 40)	(Singapore) Tampines Rovers
16	Shahril Jantan	(Singapore)	20 April 1980 (age 46)	(Singapore) Warriors FC
22	Farhan Amin	(Singapore)	1 January 1990 (age 36)	(Singapore) Geylang International
Defenders
2	Redzwan Atan	(Singapore)	7 October 1990 (age 36)	Youth Team
4	Juma'at Jantan	(Singapore)	23 February 1984 (age 42)	(Singapore) LionsXII
5	Noh Rahman	(Singapore)	2 August 1980 (age 46)	(Singapore) Warriors FC
6	Abdil Qaiyyim Mutalib	(Singapore)	14 May 1989 (age 37)	(Singapore) Tampines Rovers
7	Imran Sahib	(Singapore)	12 October 1982 (age 44)	(Singapore) Woodlands Wellington
11	Sirina Camara	(France)	12 April 1991 (age 35)	(Singapore) Étoile FC
19	Sufianto Salleh	(Singapore)	9 March 1993 (age 33)	(Singapore) Young Lions FC
20	Ang Zhiwei	(Singapore)	2 August 1989 (age 37)	(Singapore) Tampines Rovers
Midfielders
3	Song Ui-young	(South Korea)	8 November 1993 (age 33)	Youth Team
8	Azhar Sairudin	(Singapore)	30 September 1986 (age 40)	(Singapore) Hougang United
10	Yasir Hanapi	(Singapore)	21 June 1989 (age 37)	(Singapore) Geylang International
13	Syahiran Miswan	(Singapore)	22 January 1994 (age 32)	Youth Team
14	Stanley Ng	(Singapore)	27 May 1992 (age 34)	(Singapore) Young Lions FC
15	Fazli Ayob	(Singapore)	24 January 1980 (age 46)	(Singapore) LionsxII
18	Ambroise Begue	(France)	22 May 1995 (age 31)	(France) AS Nancy
21	Kamel Ramdani	(Algeria)	21 November 1980 (age 45)	(Singapore) Tanjong Pagar United
Strikers
9	Ken Ilsø	(Denmark)	2 November 1986 (age 40)	(China) Guangzhou R&F F.C.
12	Nur Hizami	(Singapore)		Youth Team
17	Masrezwan Masturi	(Singapore)	17 February 1981 (age 45)	(Singapore) Tanjong Pagar United

=== Prime League squad ===
Squad No.	Name	Nationality	Date of birth (age)	Last club
Goalkeepers
30	Zulfairuuz Rudy	(Singapore)	22 May 1994 (age 32)	(Singapore) Young Lions FC
Defenders
23	R Aaravin	(Singapore)	7 February 1996 (age 30)	Youth Team
24	Yeo Hai Ngee	(Singapore)	12 January 1995 (age 31)	Youth Team
26	Shahrin Saberin	(Singapore)	14 February 1995 (age 31)	Youth Team
34	Luqman Ismail	(Singapore)	9 March 1994 (age 32)	Youth Team
Midfielders
Strikers
29	Amir Zalani	(Singapore)	4 December 1996 (age 29)	Youth Team
39	Muhaimin Suhaimi	(Singapore)	20 February 1995 (age 31)	Youth Team

== Club ==
=== Coaching staff ===
Position	Staff
S.League Head Coach	(Singapore) Philippe Aw
S.League Assistant Coach; Prime League Head Coach	(Singapore) Robin Chitrakar
S.League Assistant Coach	(France) Steve Vilmiaire
Team Manager	(Singapore) Badri Ghent
Technical Director	(France) Steve Vilmiaire
Technical Director	(Algeria) Adlane Messelem
Goalkeeper Coach	(Singapore) Adi Saleh
Head of Sports Performance	(Germany) Dirk Schauenberg
Sports Trainer	(Philippines) Daisyree Anarna
Logistics Officer	(Singapore) Mohd Zahir
Prime League Team Manager	(Singapore) Bernard Lan
Under-17 Head Coach	(Singapore) Fadzuhasny Juraimi
Under-17 Head Coach	(Singapore) Syed Azmir
Under-15 Head Coach	(Singapore) Syed Karim
Under-15 Head Coach	(Singapore) Yahya Madon

Source: Home United FC

== Transfers ==
=== Pre-season transfers ===
==== In ====
Position	Player	Transferred from	Ref
GK	(Singapore) Hyrulnizam Juma'at	(Singapore) Tampines Rovers	
MF	(Singapore) Azhar Sairudin	(Singapore) Hougang United	
MF	(Algeria) Kamel Ramdani	(Singapore) Tanjong Pagar United	
MF	(France) Ambroise Begue	(France) AS Nancy	
FW	(Denmark) Ken Ilsø	(China) Guangzhou R&F F.C.	

==== Out ====
Position	Player	Transferred To	Ref
DF	(Singapore) Daniel Ong	(Singapore) Warriors FC	
DF	(South Korea) Kwon Da-kyung		
DF	(Singapore) Ismail Yunos	(Singapore) Warriors FC	
DF	(Singapore) Precious Emuejeraye	(Malaysia) SPA F.C.	
MF	(South Korea) Lee Kwan-woo	Retired	
MF	(Singapore) Zulkifli Suzliman	(Singapore) Geylang International	
MF	(Singapore) Izzdin Shafiq	(Singapore) LionsXII	
FW	(Japan) Bruno Suzuki	(Singapore) Geylang International	
FW	(Singapore) Ahmed Fahmie	Retired	
FW	(Singapore) Qiu Li	Retired	
FW	(Singapore) Fazrul Nawaz	(Malaysia) Sabah FA	
FW	(Singapore) Indra Sahdan	(Singapore) Tampines Rovers	

==== Promoted ====
Position	Player	Ref
DF	(Singapore) R Aaravin	
DF	(Singapore) Yeo Hai Ngee	
MF	(Singapore) Syahiran Miswan	
MF	(South Korea) Song Ui-young	
FW	(Singapore) Nur Hizami	

== Team statistics ==
=== Appearances and goals ===
Numbers in parentheses denote appearances as substitute.

No.	Pos.	Player	Sleague		League Cup		Singapore Cup		Total	
No.	Pos.	Player	Apps.	Goals	Apps.	Goals	Apps.	Goals	Apps.	Goals
1	GK	(Singapore) Hyrulnizam Juma'at	14(2)	0	0	0	0	0	16	0
2	DF	(Singapore) Redzwan Atan	9(5)	0	0	0	1	0	15	0
3	MF	(South Korea) Song Ui-young	20	1	1	0	1(1)	0	22	1
4	DF	(Singapore) Juma'at Jantan	17(3)	0	5	0	2	0	27	0
5	DF	(Singapore) Noh Rahman	8(1)	0	1	0	0	0	10	0
6	DF	(Singapore) Abdil Qaiyyim Mutalib	25	1	5	1	1	0	31	2
7	MF	(Singapore) Imran Sahib	3(7)	2	0(3)	2	0	0	13	4
8	MF	(Singapore) Azhar Sairudin	16(5)	4	5	2	1(1)	2	28	8
9	FW	(Denmark) Ken Ilso	17(1)	10	5	2	1	0	24	12
10	MF	(Singapore) Yasir Hanapi	24(1)	1	4	0	2	0	31	1
11	DF	(France) Sirina Camara	17(4)	1	3	0	2	0	26	1
12	FW	(Singapore) Nur Hizami	3(14)	0	0(1)	0	0	0	18	0
13	MF	(Singapore) Syahiran Miswan	0(1)	0	0(1)	0	0	0	2	0
14	MF	(Singapore) Stanley Ng	13(9)	3	3(2)	0	2	0	29	3
15	DF	(Singapore) Fazli Ayob	13(6)	0	3(1)	0	1(1)	0	25	0
16	DF	(Singapore) Shahril Jantan	12	0	5	0	2	0	19	0
17	FW	(Singapore) Masrezwan Masturi	0(2)	0	0	0	0	0	2	0
18	MF	(France) Ambroise Begue	19(3)	4	3(1)	2	2	0	28	6
19	DF	(Singapore) Sufianto Salleh	3(7)	1	2(2)	0	0(1)	0	15	1
20	DF	(Singapore) Ang Zhiwei	19(3)	0	3	0	2	1	27	1
21	MF	(Algeria) Kamel Ramdani	23(2)	6	5	0	1(1)	0	32	6
22	GK	(Singapore) Farhan Amin	0	0	0	0	0	0	0	0
23	DF	(Singapore) R Aaravin	11(1)	0	2	0	2	0	16	0
26	DF	(Singapore) Shahrin Saberin	5	0	0	0	0	0	5	0
34	DF	(Singapore) Muhaimin Suhaimin	0(1)	0	0	0	0	0	1	0

== Competitions ==
=== S.League ===
Win Draw Loss

3 March 2015 Round 1	Geylang International (Singapore)	1–1	(Singapore) Home United	Bedok Stadium
	Jozef Kapláň 46'		Ken Ilsø 23'

6 March 2015 Round 2	Hougang United (Singapore)	1–1	(Singapore) Home United	Hougang Stadium
	Yuki Uchiyama 34'		Ken Ilsø 42' (pen.)

13 March 2015 Round 3	Home United (Singapore)	2–0	(Singapore) Tampines Rovers	Bishan Stadium
	Ken Ilsø 22'; Sirina Camara 81'

21 March 2015 Round 4	Brunei DPMM	2–2	(Singapore) Home United	Hassanal Bolkiah National Stadium
	Rafael Ramazotti 45' 60'		Ken Ilsø 30'; Kamel Ramdani 84'

5 April 2015 Round 5	Home United (Singapore)	1–4	(Singapore) Warriors FC	Bishan Stadium
	Kamel Ramdani 55'		Fazrul Nawaz 5' 30'; Nicolás Vélez 38'; Kevin McCann 45+2'

8 April 2015 Round 6	Home United (Singapore)	3–1	(Singapore) Balestier Khalsa	Bishan Stadium
	Kamel Ramdani 16' (pen.); Yasir Hanapi 50'; Stanley Ng 78'		Robert Peričić 35'

17 April 2015 Round 7	Harimau Muda B (Malaysia)	1–0	(Singapore) Home United	Yishun Stadium
	Mohd Syafwan bin Mohd Syahlan 90'

2 April 2015 Round 8	Home United (Singapore)	0–0	(Singapore) Albirex Niigata (S)	Bishan Stadium

28 April 2015 Round 9	Home United (Singapore)	0–1	(Singapore) Young Lions FC	Bishan Stadium
			Shamil Sharif 88'

8 May 2015 Round 10	Home United (Singapore)	0–1	(Singapore) Geylang International	Bishan Stadium
			Tatsuro Inui 44'

14 May 2015 Round 11	Home United (Singapore)	4–0	(Singapore) Hougang United	Bishan Stadium
	Ambroise Begue 20'; Kamel Ramdani 25'; Yuki Uchiyama 30' (o.g.); Azhar Sairudin 57'

17 May 2015 Round 12	Tampines Rovers (Singapore)	3–0	(Singapore) Home United	Bishan Stadium
	Mateo Roskam 19'; Rodrigo Tosi 34' (pen.) 72'

22 July 2015 Round 13	Home United (Singapore)	0–0	Brunei DPMM	Bishan Stadium

30 July 2015 Round 14	Warriors FC (Singapore)	2–2	(Singapore) Home United	Choa Chu Kang Stadium
	Shi Jia Yi 40'; Fazrul Nawaz 75'		Azhar Sairudin 3' 30'; Abdil Qaiyyim Mutalib 90+5'

3 August 2015 Round 15	Balestier Khalsa (Singapore)	1–1	(Singapore) Home United	Toa Payoh Stadium
	Miroslav Krištić 38'		Azhar Sairudin 64'

6 August 2015 Round 16	Home United (Singapore)	4–2	(Malaysia) Harimau Muda B	Bishan Stadium
	Ken Ilsø 3'; Stanley Ng 13'; Kamel Ramdani 14'; Imran Sahib 86'		Muhamad Faizat bin Mohamad Ghazli 55' 57'

20 August 2015 Round 17	Albirex Niigata (S) (Singapore)	0–0	(Singapore) Home United	Jurong East Stadium

27 August 2015 Round 18	Young Lions FC (Singapore)	0–2	(Singapore) Home United	Jalan Besar Stadium
			Azhar Sairudin 52'; Ambroise Begue 60'

17 September 2015 Round 19	Hougang United (Singapore)	0–1	(Singapore) Home United	Hougang Stadium
			Ken Ilsø 63' (pen.)

17 October 2015 Round 20	Brunei DPMM	4–4	(Singapore) Home United	Hassanal Bolkiah National Stadium
	Paulo Sérgio Moreira Gonçalves 49'; Rafael Ramazotti 64' 79' (pen.); Maududi Hilmi Kasmi 89'		Ken Ilsø 52' 83' 86'; Imran Sahib 88'

21 October 2015 Round 21	Home United (Singapore)	2–1	(Singapore) Warriors FC	Bishan Stadium
	Kamel Ramdani 58'; Ambroise Begue 85'		Fazrul Nawaz 40'

26 October 2015 Round 22	Home United (Singapore)	2–0	(Singapore) Balestier Khalsa	Bishan Stadium
	Sufianto Salleh 2'; Ken Ilsø 32'

30 October 2015 Round 23	Geylang International (Singapore)	2–1	(Singapore) Home United	Bedok Stadium
	Kento Fukuda 63'; Bruno Suzuki 90'		Ambroise Begue 40'

2 November 2015 Round 24	Harimau Muda B (Malaysia)	1–0	(Singapore) Home United	Yishun Stadium
	Akhir Bahari 13'

5 November 2015 Round 25	Home United (Singapore)	1–2	(Singapore) Albirex Niigata (S)	Bishan Stadium
	Song Ui-young 28'		Kento Fujihara 76'; Atsushi Kamata 79'

8 November 2015 Round 26	Home United (Singapore)	2–3	(Singapore) Tampines Rovers	Bishan Stadium
	Jufri Taha 42' (o.g.); Stanley Ng 61'		Mateo Roskam 30' 66'; Predrag Počuča 71'

15 November 2015 Round 27	Home United (Singapore)	2–1	(Singapore) Young Lions FC	Bishan Stadium
	Stanley Ng 58'; Ken Ilsø 83'		Taufik Suparno 50'

Pos	Team	Pld	W	D	L	GF	GA	GD	Pts	Qualification
4	Balestier Khalsa	27	12	8	7	39	35	+4	44	Qualification to AFC Cup Group Stage
5	Warriors FC	27	11	4	12	40	51	−11	37	
6	Home United	27	9	9	9	38	34	+4	36	
7	(Malaysia) Harimau Muda B (Note: The three foreign clubs – Albirex Niigata (S), DPMM FC and Harimau Muda – as well as the Football Association of Singapore (FAS) under-23 team, Young Lions, are not eligible for any AFC competition spots.)	27	9	6	12	29	40	−11	33	
8	Geylang International	27	7	7	13	36	44	−8	28	

Source: S.League
Rules for classification: 1) points; 2) goal difference; 3) number of goals scored; 4) number of wins

=== Singapore Cup ===
Win Draw Loss

Quarter Final 1st Leg	Warriors FC (Singapore)	1–2	(Singapore) Home United	Choa Chu Kang Stadium
	Karlo Ivančić 57'		Ken Ilsø 55' 70'

Quarter Final 2nd Leg	Home United (Singapore)	2–0 (4–1 agg.)	(Singapore) Warriors FC	Bishan Stadium
	Ambroise Begue 38'; Imran Sahib 90'

Home United won 4–1 on aggregate.

Semi Final 1st Leg	Brunei DPMM	3–2	(Singapore) Home United	Jalan Besar Stadium
	Paulo Sérgio Moreira Gonçalves 7'; Azwan Ali Rahman 63'; Rafael Ramazotti 86'		Azhar Sairudin 57'; Ambroise Begue 58'

Semi Final 2nd Leg	Home United (Singapore)	2–0 (4–3 agg.)	Brunei DPMM	Bishan Stadium
	Azhar Sairudin 22'; Imran Sahib 79'

Home United won 4–3 on aggregate.

Final	Albirex Niigata (S) (Japan)	2–1	(Singapore) Home United	Jalan Besar Stadium
	Rion Taki 78'; Kento Nagasaki 87'		Abdil Qaiyyim Mutalib 72'

=== Singapore League Cup ===
Win Draw Loss

22 June 2015 Group Match	Albirex Niigata (S) (Japan)	2–0	(Singapore) Home United	Jurong East Stadium
	Itsuki Yamada 81'; Kento Nagasaki 90'

1 July 2015 Group Match	Sporting Westlake FC (Singapore)	0–3	(Singapore) Home United	Yishun Stadium
			Azhar Sairudin 21' 34'; Ang Zhiwei 46'

Pos	Team	Pld	W	D	L	GF	GA	GD	Pts	Qualification
1	Albirex Niigata (S)	2	2	0	0	4	0	+4	6	Advance to semi-final
2	Home United	2	1	0	1	3	2	+1	3	
3	Sporting Westlake	2	0	0	2	0	5	−5	0	

Source: S.League
