= Harald Fleischer =

German footballer

Personal information
- Date of birth: 22 January 1985 (age 41)
- Place of birth: Făgăraș, Romania
- Height: 1.80 m (5 ft 11 in)
- Position: Midfielder

Youth career
- TV 1860 Schweinau
- –2001: 1. FC Nürnberg
- 2001–2004: Greuther Fürth

Senior career*
Years	Team	Apps	(Gls)
2004–2007	Greuther Fürth II	88	(14)
2007–2009	Jahn Regensburg	19	(0)
2009–2010	1. FC Eintracht Bamberg	26	(4)
2010–2019	Bayern Hof		
- * Club domestic league appearances and goals

Harald Fleischer (born 22 January 1985) is a German former professional footballer who played as a midfielder.

== Career ==
Fleischer made his professional debut in the 3. Liga for Jahn Regensburg on 13 December 2008, coming on as a substitute in the 87th minute for Manuel Hiemer in the 3–0 away win against Eintracht Braunschweig.
