= Hiemer =

Hiemer is a German surname. Notable people with the surname include:

- Ernst Hiemer (1900–1974), German writer
- Johanna Hiemer (born 1995), Austrian ski mountaineer
- Manuel Hiemer (born 1985), German footballer
- Uli Hiemer (born 1962), German ice hockey player

== See also ==
- Riemer
