= List of German football transfers winter 2010–11 =

This is a list of German football transfers in the winter 2010–11 transfer window by club.

== Bundesliga ==
=== FC Bayern Munich ===
In:

Out:

Note: Flags indicate national team as has been defined under FIFA eligibility rules. Players may hold more than one non-FIFA nationality.

| No. | Pos. | Nation | Player |
|---|---|---|---|
| 30 | MF | BRA | Luiz Gustavo (from 1899 Hoffenheim) |

| No. | Pos. | Nation | Player |
|---|---|---|---|
| 4 | DF | NED | Edson Braafheid (to 1899 Hoffenheim) |
| 6 | DF | ARG | Martín Demichelis (to Málaga CF) |
| 17 | MF | NED | Mark van Bommel (to AC Milan) |
| 27 | MF | AUT | David Alaba (on loan to 1899 Hoffenheim) |

=== FC Schalke 04 ===
In:

| No. | Pos. | Nation | Player |
|---|---|---|---|
| 10 | MF | IRI | Ali Karimi (from Steel Azin) |
| 15 | FW | GRE | Angelos Charisteas (from AC Arles-Avignon) |
| 23 | MF | BRA | Avelar (on loan from Karpaty Lviv) |
| 31 | MF | GER | Julian Draxler (from FC Schalke 04 U-19) |
| 40 | MF | GHA | Anthony Annan (from Rosenborg BK) |
| 43 | DF | NOR | Tore Reginiussen (loan return from U.S. Lecce) |

Out:

| No. | Pos. | Nation | Player |
|---|---|---|---|
| 10 | MF | CRO | Ivan Rakitić (to Sevilla FC) |
| 23 | MF | USA | Jermaine Jones (on loan to Blackburn Rovers) |
| 26 | FW | SVK | Erik Jendrišek (to SC Freiburg) |
| 34 | FW | MKD | Besart Ibraimi (to PFC Sevastopol) |

=== Werder Bremen ===
In:

| No. | Pos. | Nation | Player |
|---|---|---|---|
| 9 | FW | SWE | Denni Avdić (from IF Elfsborg) |
| 25 | DF | BRA | Samuel (free agent) |
| 31 | MF | SRB | Predrag Stevanović (from FC Schalke 04 II) |

Out:

| No. | Pos. | Nation | Player |
|---|---|---|---|
| 23 | FW | POR | Hugo Almeida (to Beşiktaş J.K.) |

=== Bayer 04 Leverkusen ===
In:

| No. | Pos. | Nation | Player |
|---|---|---|---|
| 37 | MF | SLO | Kevin Kampl (from SpVgg Greuther Fürth) |
| -- | MF | JPN | Hajime Hosogai (from Urawa Red Diamonds) |

Out:

| No. | Pos. | Nation | Player |
|---|---|---|---|
| 9 | FW | GER | Patrick Helmes (to VfL Wolfsburg) |
| 28 | MF | TUR | Burak Kaplan (on loan to Greuther Fürth) |
| -- | MF | JPN | Hajime Hosogai (on loan to FC Augsburg) |
| -- | DF | BRA | Lucas (on loan to 1. FC Kaiserslautern, previously on loan at Portuguesa) |

=== Borussia Dortmund ===
In:

| No. | Pos. | Nation | Player |
|---|---|---|---|
| -- | MF | GER | Moritz Leitner (from TSV 1860 Munich) |

Out:

| No. | Pos. | Nation | Player |
|---|---|---|---|
| 30 | MF | HUN | Tamás Hajnal (on loan to VfB Stuttgart) |
| 36 | MF | TUR | Yasin Öztekin (to Gençlerbirliği S.K.) |
| -- | MF | GER | Moritz Leitner (on loan to FC Augsburg) |

=== VfB Stuttgart ===
In:

| No. | Pos. | Nation | Player |
|---|---|---|---|
| 28 | MF | HUN | Tamás Hajnal (on loan from Borussia Dortmund) |
| 31 | FW | JPN | Shinji Okazaki (from Shimizu S-Pulse) |

Out:

| No. | Pos. | Nation | Player |
|---|---|---|---|
| 16 | DF | ITA | Mauro Camoranesi (released) |

=== Hamburger SV ===
In:

| No. | Pos. | Nation | Player |

Out:

| No. | Pos. | Nation | Player |

=== VfL Wolfsburg ===
In:

| No. | Pos. | Nation | Player |
|---|---|---|---|
| 5 | MF | KOR | Koo Ja-Cheol (from Jeju United FC) |
| 6 | FW | TUR | Tuncay (from Stoke City F.C.) |
| 25 | FW | COD | Dieumerci Mbokani (on loan from AS Monaco) |
| 29 | MF | CZE | Jan Polák (from R.S.C. Anderlecht) |
| 30 | MF | VEN | Yohandry Orozco (from Zulia FC) |
| 33 | FW | GER | Patrick Helmes (from Bayer 04 Leverkusen) |

Out:

| No. | Pos. | Nation | Player |
|---|---|---|---|
| 10 | FW | BIH | Edin Džeko (to Manchester City) |
| 15 | MF | ALG | Karim Ziani (on loan to Kayserispor) |
| 21 | FW | SUI | Nassim Ben Khalifa (on loan to 1. FC Nürnberg) |
| 31 | FW | BRA | Caiuby (on loan to FC Ingolstadt 04) |
| 43 | DF | ITA | Andrea Barzagli (to Juventus FC) |
| -- | MF | ROU | Vlad Munteanu (to Dinamo București) |

=== 1. FSV Mainz ===
In:

| No. | Pos. | Nation | Player |
|---|---|---|---|
| 25 | MF | AUT | Andreas Ivanschitz (from Panathinaikos F.C., previously on loan) |

Out:

| No. | Pos. | Nation | Player |
|---|---|---|---|
| 9 | FW | ECU | Félix Borja (to Puebla F.C.) |
| 10 | MF | CZE | Jan Šimák (released) |
| 11 | FW | DEN | Morten Rasmussen (to Aalborg BK) |
| 17 | FW | NGR | Haruna Babangida (released) |

=== Eintracht Frankfurt ===
In:

| No. | Pos. | Nation | Player |

Out:

| No. | Pos. | Nation | Player |
|---|---|---|---|
| 3 | DF | SRB | Nikola Petković (on loan to Al-Ahli, previously on loan at Tom Tomsk) |
| 11 | MF | AUT | Ümit Korkmaz (on loan to VfL Bochum) |
| 33 | MF | GER | Markus Steinhöfer (to FC Basel) |
| 34 | FW | GER | Cenk Tosun (to Gaziantepspor) |
| 35 | FW | GER | Marcos Alvarez (to Bayern Munich II) |

=== 1899 Hoffenheim ===
In:

| No. | Pos. | Nation | Player |
|---|---|---|---|
| 8 | MF | AUT | David Alaba (on loan form Bayern Munich) |
| 10 | FW | NED | Ryan Babel (from Liverpool F.C.) |
| 22 | MF | BRA | Roberto Firmino (from Figueirense FC) |
| 28 | DF | NED | Edson Braafheid (from Bayern Munich) |
| -- | FW | GER | Kevin Volland (from 1860 Munich) |

Out:

| No. | Pos. | Nation | Player |
|---|---|---|---|
| 8 | MF | GER | Christian Eichner (to 1. FC Köln) |
| 9 | FW | SEN | Demba Ba (to West Ham United) |
| 11 | FW | GER | Marco Terrazzino (to Karlsruher SC) |
| 18 | FW | GHA | Prince Tagoe (on loan to FK Partizan) |
| 21 | MF | BRA | Luiz Gustavo (to Bayern Munich) |
| 39 | MF | GER | Pascal Groß (to Karlsruher SC) |
| -- | FW | BRA | Wellington (to Figueirense FC, previously on loan at Fortuna Düsseldorf) |
| -- | FW | GER | Kevin Volland (on loan to 1860 Munich) |

=== Borussia Mönchengladbach ===
In:

| No. | Pos. | Nation | Player |
|---|---|---|---|
| 6 | MF | GER | Michael Fink (on loan from Beşiktaş J.K.) |
| 16 | DF | NOR | Håvard Nordtveit (from Arsenal F.C.) |
| 19 | FW | GER | Mike Hanke (from Hannover 96) |
| 39 | DF | AUT | Martin Stranzl (from FC Spartak Moscow) |

Out:

| No. | Pos. | Nation | Player |
|---|---|---|---|
| 6 | DF | GER | Jan-Ingwer Callsen-Bracker (to FC Augsburg) |
| 8 | MF | NED | Marcel Meeuwis (on loan to Feyenoord) |
| 9 | FW | ARG | Raúl Bobadilla (on loan to Aris Thessaloniki F.C.) |
| 26 | MF | USA | Michael Bradley (on loan to Aston Villa F.C.) |

=== 1. FC Köln ===
In:

| No. | Pos. | Nation | Player |
|---|---|---|---|
| 1 | GK | GER | Michael Rensing (free agent) |
| 4 | MF | GER | Christian Eichner (from TSG 1899 Hoffenheim) |
| 13 | FW | BFA | Wilfried Sanou (loan return from Urawa Red Diamonds) |
| 15 | MF | POL | Sławomir Peszko (from Lech Poznań) |
| 43 | DF | JPN | Tomoaki Makino (from Sanfrecce Hiroshima) |

Out:

| No. | Pos. | Nation | Player |
|---|---|---|---|
| 1 | GK | COL | Faryd Mondragón (to Philadelphia Union) |
| 9 | FW | NGR | Manasseh Ishiaku (on loan to K. Sint-Truidense V.V.) |
| 13 | MF | GER | Daniel Brosinski (to SV Wehen Wiesbaden) |
| 49 | FW | ANG | José Pierre Vunguidica (on loan to Kickers Offenbach) |

=== SC Freiburg ===
In:

| No. | Pos. | Nation | Player |
|---|---|---|---|
| 19 | FW | SVK | Erik Jendrišek (from FC Schalke 04) |

Out:

| No. | Pos. | Nation | Player |
|---|---|---|---|
| 20 | MF | CRO | Ivica Banović (on loan to MSV Duisburg) |

=== Hannover 96 ===
In:

| No. | Pos. | Nation | Player |

Out:

| No. | Pos. | Nation | Player |
|---|---|---|---|
| 9 | FW | GER | Mike Hanke (to Borussia Mönchengladbach) |
| 22 | MF | ALB | Valdet Rama (to Örebro SK) |

=== 1. FC Nürnberg ===
In:

| No. | Pos. | Nation | Player |
|---|---|---|---|
| 9 | FW | SUI | Nassim Ben Khalifa (on loan from VfL Wolfsburg) |

Out:

| No. | Pos. | Nation | Player |
|---|---|---|---|
| 19 | FW | GHA | Isaac Boakye (released) |
| 21 | MF | AUS | Dario Vidošić (on loan to Arminia Bielefeld) |
| 23 | DF | AUS | Matthew Špiranović (to Urawa Red Diamonds, previously on loan) |
| 33 | DF | GER | Felicio Brown Forbes (on loan to FC Carl Zeiss Jena) |

=== 1. FC Kaiserslautern ===
In:

| No. | Pos. | Nation | Player |
|---|---|---|---|
| 14 | DF | BRA | Lucas (on loan from Bayer 04 Leverkusen, previously on loan at Portuguesa) |
| 24 | FW | CZE | Adam Hloušek (on loan from Slavia Prague) |

Out:

| No. | Pos. | Nation | Player |

=== FC St. Pauli ===
In:

| No. | Pos. | Nation | Player |

Out:

| No. | Pos. | Nation | Player |
|---|---|---|---|
| 29 | FW | GER | Nils Pichinot (to FC Carl Zeiss Jena) |
| 32 | DF | GHA | Davidson Drobo-Ampem (on loan to Esbjerg fB) |

== 2. Bundesliga ==
=== VfL Bochum ===
In:

| No. | Pos. | Nation | Player |
|---|---|---|---|
| 20 | MF | AUT | Ümit Korkmaz (on loan from Eintracht Frankfurt) |
| 35 | DF | GER | Matthias Ostrzolek (from VfL Bochum II) |

Out:

| No. | Pos. | Nation | Player |
|---|---|---|---|
| 10 | MF | SRB | Miloš Marić (to Lierse S.K.) |
| 19 | MF | GER | Dennis Grote (to Rot-Weiß Oberhausen) |
| 20 | DF | GER | Mergim Mavraj (to SpVgg Greuther Fürth) |
| 21 | DF | FRA | Marc Pfertzel (to Kavala F.C.) |

=== Hertha BSC ===
In:

| No. | Pos. | Nation | Player |

Out:

| No. | Pos. | Nation | Player |
|---|---|---|---|
| 7 | MF | AUT | Daniel Beichler (on loan to FC St. Gallen) |
| 8 | MF | HUN | Pál Dárdai (to Hertha BSC II) |
| 22 | DF | BRA | Kaká (on loan to S.C. Braga) |
| 24 | DF | GER | Shervin Radjabali-Fardi (on loan to Alemannia Aachen) |

=== FC Augsburg ===
In:

| No. | Pos. | Nation | Player |
|---|---|---|---|
| 7 | MF | JPN | Hajime Hosogai (on loan from Bayer 04 Leverkusen) |
| 18 | DF | GER | Jan-Ingwer Callsen-Bracker (from Borussia Mönchengladbach) |
| 28 | MF | GER | Moritz Leitner (on loan from Borussia Dortmund) |

Out:

| No. | Pos. | Nation | Player |

=== Fortuna Düsseldorf ===
In:

| No. | Pos. | Nation | Player |
|---|---|---|---|
| 13 | MF | POL | Adam Bodzek (from MSV Duisburg) |
| 20 | FW | DEN | Ken Ilsø (on loan from FC Midtjylland) |

Out:

| No. | Pos. | Nation | Player |
|---|---|---|---|
| 16 | FW | BRA | Wellington (loan return to TSG 1899 Hoffenheim) |
| 20 | MF | BRA | Rockenbach (to RB Leipzig) |

=== SC Paderborn ===
In:

| No. | Pos. | Nation | Player |

Out:

| No. | Pos. | Nation | Player |
|---|---|---|---|
| 31 | FW | GER | Sven Krause (on loan to 1. FC Saarbrücken) |

=== MSV Duisburg ===
In:

| No. | Pos. | Nation | Player |
|---|---|---|---|
| 4 | MF | CRO | Ivica Banović (on loan from SC Freiburg) |
| 7 | MF | AUT | Jürgen Säumel (from FC Torino, previously on loan at Brescia) |

Out:

| No. | Pos. | Nation | Player |
|---|---|---|---|
| 7 | MF | GER | Michael Blum (on loan to Hansa Rostock) |
| 13 | MF | POL | Adam Bodzek (to Fortuna Düsseldorf) |

=== Arminia Bielefeld ===
In:

| No. | Pos. | Nation | Player |
|---|---|---|---|
| 7 | DF | TOG | Daré Nibombé (from FK Baku) |
| 26 | FW | NED | Romano Denneboom (free agent) |
| 45 | MF | GER | Sandro Kaiser (on loan from TSV 1860 München) |
| 46 | FW | CRO | Josip Tadić (from Grenoble Foot 38) |
| 47 | MF | AUS | Dario Vidošić (on loan from 1. FC Nürnberg) |
| 49 | MF | BUL | Galin Ivanov (on loan from Slavia Sofia) |
| 50 | FW | NGR | Eke Uzoma (on loan from TSV 1860 München) |

Out:

| No. | Pos. | Nation | Player |
|---|---|---|---|
| 1 | GK | RSA | Rowen Fernández (to Supersport United F.C.) |
| 7 | DF | GER | Kevin Schöneberg (to VfL Osnabrück) |
| 10 | FW | GER | Oliver Neuville (retired) |

=== TSV 1860 Munich ===
In:

| No. | Pos. | Nation | Player |
|---|---|---|---|
| 31 | FW | GER | Kevin Volland (on loan from 1899 Hoffenheim) |

Out:

| No. | Pos. | Nation | Player |
|---|---|---|---|
| 5 | DF | FRA | Mathieu Béda (to FC Zürich) |
| 14 | MF | PER | Juan José Barros (loan return to Coronel Bolognesi) |
| 19 | DF | GEO | Mate Ghvinianidze (to FC Sevastopol) |
| 21 | MF | GER | Sandro Kaiser (on loan to Arminia Bielefeld) |
| 22 | FW | NGR | Eke Uzoma (on loan to Arminia Bielefeld) |
| 31 | FW | GER | Kevin Volland (to 1899 Hoffenheim) |
| 35 | MF | GER | Moritz Leitner (to Borussia Dortmund) |
| 33 | FW | USA | Kenny Cooper (to Portland Timbers) |

=== Karlsruher SC ===
In:

| No. | Pos. | Nation | Player |
|---|---|---|---|
| 39 | FW | RSA | Delron Buckley (free agent) |
| 40 | FW | ROU | Andrei Cristea (from Dinamo București) |
| 41 | FW | BIH | Denis Omerbegović (from SV Elversberg) |
| 42 | DF | SUI | Kiliann Witschi (from APEP Pitsilia) |
| 43 | MF | GER | Pascal Groß (from 1899 Hoffenheim) |
| 44 | FW | GER | Marco Terrazzino (from 1899 Hoffenheim) |
| 45 | DF | CZE | Martin Hudec (from Sigma Olomouc) |

Out:

| No. | Pos. | Nation | Player |
|---|---|---|---|
| 1 | GK | FRA | Jean-Francois Kornetzky (to SV Sandhausen) |
| 14 | FW | GER | Anton Fink (on loan to VfR Aalen) |

=== FC Energie Cottbus ===
In:

| No. | Pos. | Nation | Player |

Out:

| No. | Pos. | Nation | Player |
|---|---|---|---|
| 3 | DF | UKR | Valeriy Sokolenko (to FC Chernomorets Odesa) |
| 14 | FW | ROU | Sergiu Radu (to Alemannia Aachen) |

=== SpVgg Greuther Fürth ===
In:

| No. | Pos. | Nation | Player |
|---|---|---|---|
| 5 | DF | GER | Mergim Mavraj (from VfL Bochum) |
| 10 | FW | CZE | Miroslav Slepička (on loan from NK Dinamo Zagreb) |
| 11 | MF | TUR | Burak Kaplan (on loan from Bayer 04 Leverkusen) |
| 22 | GK | GER | Alexander Walke (on loan from FC Red Bull Salzburg) |

Out:

| No. | Pos. | Nation | Player |
|---|---|---|---|
| 4 | DF | CRO | Marino Biliškov (to FC Ingolstadt 04) |
| 5 | DF | GER | Jan Mauersberger (to VfL Osnabrück) |
| 10 | MF | SLO | Kevin Kampl (to Bayer 04 Leverkusen) |
| 11 | FW | GER | Dani Schahin (on loan to Dynamo Dresden) |

=== 1. FC Union Berlin ===
In:

| No. | Pos. | Nation | Player |

Out:

| No. | Pos. | Nation | Player |

=== Alemannia Aachen ===
In:

| No. | Pos. | Nation | Player |
|---|---|---|---|
| 43 | DF | GER | Shervin Radjabali-Fardi (on loan from Hertha BSC) |
| 44 | MF | TUR | Bilal Çubukçu (from Gençlerbirliği S.K.) |
| 45 | FW | ROU | Sergiu Radu (from Energie Cottbus) |

Out:

| No. | Pos. | Nation | Player |
|---|---|---|---|
| 20 | FW | EST | Henrik Ojamaa (on loan to Fortuna Sittard) |

=== Rot-Weiß Oberhausen ===
In:

| No. | Pos. | Nation | Player |
|---|---|---|---|
| 26 | DF | GER | Steven Ruprecht (from FC Ingolstadt 04) |
| 29 | MF | GER | Dennis Grote (from VfL Bochum) |

Out:

| No. | Pos. | Nation | Player |

=== FSV Frankfurt ===
In:

| No. | Pos. | Nation | Player |
|---|---|---|---|
| -- | FW | TUR | Uğur Albayrak (from Kayserispor) |

Out:

| No. | Pos. | Nation | Player |

=== VfL Osnabrück ===
In:

| No. | Pos. | Nation | Player |
|---|---|---|---|
| 19 | FW | NOR | Flamur Kastrati (on loan from FC Twente) |
| 20 | DF | GER | Jan Mauersberger (from SpVgg Greuther Fürth) |
| 27 | DF | GER | Kevin Schöneberg (form Arminia Bielefeld) |

Out:

| No. | Pos. | Nation | Player |

=== FC Erzgebirge Aue ===
In:

| No. | Pos. | Nation | Player |
|---|---|---|---|
| -- | FW | GER | Kevin Stephan (on loan from Hertha BSC II) |

Out:

| No. | Pos. | Nation | Player |
|---|---|---|---|
| 16 | MF | GER | Manuel Hiemer (released) |

=== FC Ingolstadt 04 ===
In:

| No. | Pos. | Nation | Player |
|---|---|---|---|
| 23 | FW | USA | Edson Buddle (from Los Angeles Galaxy) |
| 31 | FW | BRA | Caiuby (on loan from VfL Wolfsburg) |
| 33 | DF | CRO | Marino Biliškov (from SpVgg Greuther Fürth) |
| 38 | FW | POL | Artur Wichniarek (from Lech Poznan) |

Out:

| No. | Pos. | Nation | Player |
|---|---|---|---|
| 3 | DF | GER | Steven Ruprecht (to Rot-Weiß Oberhausen) |
| 17 | MF | GER | Robert Fleßers (to RW Ahlen) |
| 23 | FW | GER | Steffen Wohlfarth (to FC Bayern Munich II) |

== See also ==
- 2010–11 Bundesliga
- 2010–11 2. Bundesliga
- List of German football transfers summer 2010
