= Faris Ramli =

Singaporean footballer (born 1992)

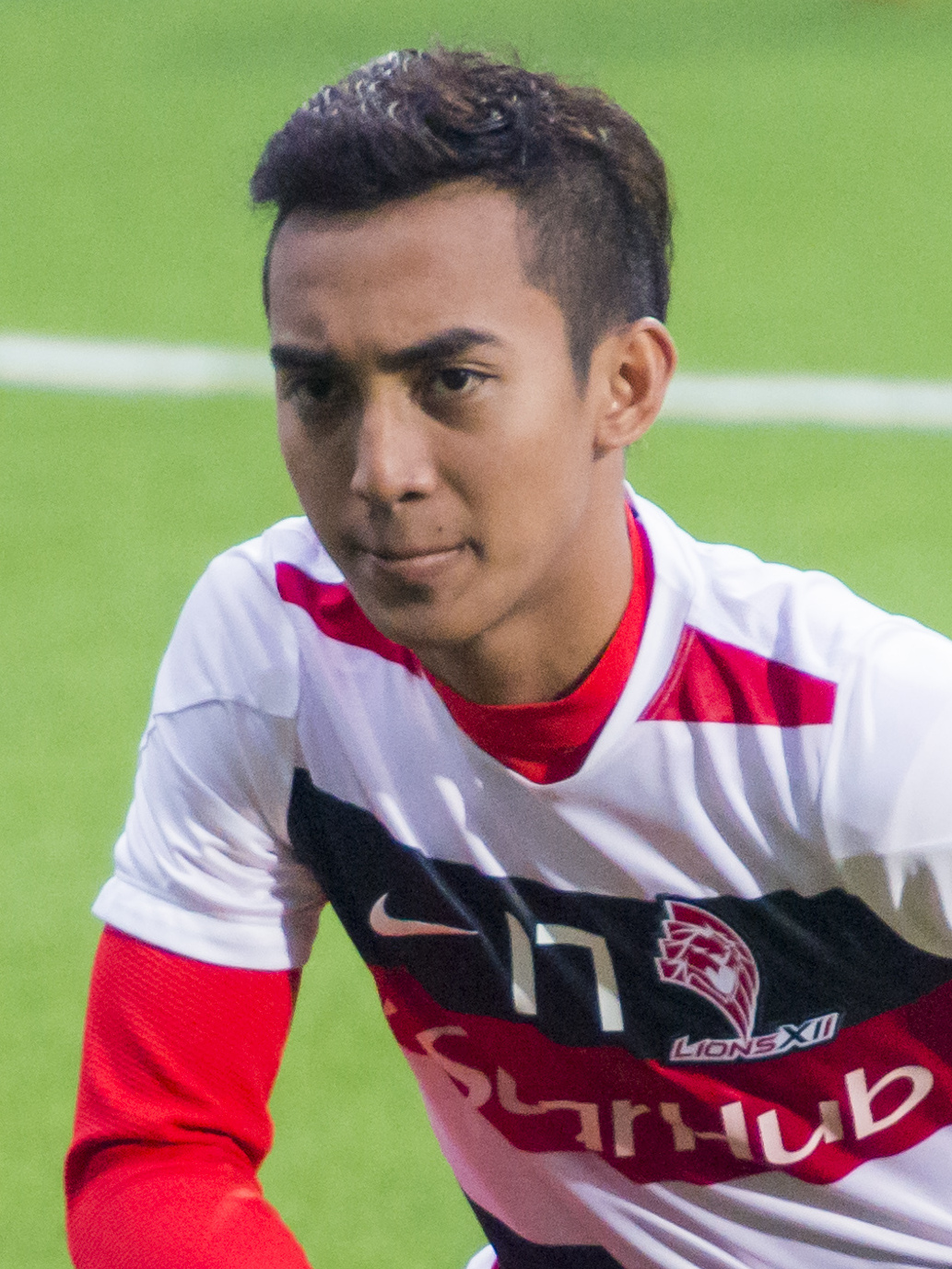
- Faris with LionsXII in 2014

Personal information
- Full name: Muhammad Faris bin Ramli
- Date of birth: 24 August 1992 (age 34)
- Place of birth: Singapore
- Height: 1.68 m (5 ft 6 in)
- Positions: Winger; attacking midfielder

Team information
- Current team: Tampines Rovers
- Number: 10

Youth career
- 2005–2010: National Football Academy

Senior career*
Years	Team	Apps	(Gls)
2010–2012	Young Lions	51	(7)
2013–2015	LionsXII	59	(13)
2016–2017	Home United	38	(16)
2018	PKNS	21	(6)
2019	Perlis	0	(0)
2019	Hougang United	24	(16)
2020	Terengganu	11	(3)
2021–2022	Lion City Sailors	41	(8)
2023–	Tampines Rovers	38	(12)

International career^{‡}
2011–2015	Singapore U23	13	(4)
2013–	Singapore	92	(15)
Medal record
Men's football
Representing Singapore
Sea Games
Bronze medal – third place	Naypyidaw 2013	Football
- * Club domestic league appearances and goals as of 22:49, 25 October 2022 (UTC) ‡ National team caps and goals as of 10 June 2025

Muhammad Faris bin Ramli (born 24 August 1992) is a Singaporean professional footballer who plays as a winger or an attacking midfielder for Singapore Premier League club Tampines Rovers and the Singapore national team.

A forward, Faris primarily plays as a winger. In 2012, Faris made it to the top 52 of Nike's 'The Chance' competition, a worldwide talent hunt for young players. However, he was not drafted in the selection of the final 16 in Barcelona. Faris played for the Young Lions prior to featuring for LionsXII in the Malaysia Super League.

== Early life and education ==
Faris studied in Loyang Primary School and Loyang Secondary School and Temasek Polytechnic. His brother Fuad Ramli had two stints in the Singaporean league with Geylang International.

== Club career ==
=== Young Lions ===
Faris began his professional football career with Young Lions in the 2010 S.League.

=== LionsXII ===
In December 2012, the Football Association of Singapore announced that Faris was to join the LionsXII for the 2013 Malaysia Super League. He had his most prolific season yet in 2015, scoring 11 goals in all competitions, 8 in the MSL and 2 in the 2015 Malaysia FA Cup, which was won by the LionsXII, and 1 in the 2015 Malaysia Cup. He had scored the first goal in the 3–1 win over Kelantan that brought the Malaysia FA Cup to Singapore. His 8 goals in the league was good enough to see him finish the season as the LionsXII's top scorer in the league.

=== Home United ===
In 2016, although courted by high spending Tampines Rovers as well as Malaysia Super League clubs, Pahang and Selangor, Faris instead choose to signed for Home United for the 2016 S.League campaign after the LionsXII was disbanded following the conclusion of the 2015 MSL season. However, Faris sustained injuries in 2016.

Although he was once again wooed by some MSL sides, Faris chose to extend his contract with Home. He started the 2017 season scoring 3 goals in 4 appearances in the league for Home. He also has a further 4 goals in 6 games in the 2017 AFC Cup, helping his team become the first team to qualify for the zonal semi-finals. In the 9–3 defeat of Brunei DPMM he scored 4 and assisted another 4. He eventually finished as the joint local top-scorer of the league with Shahril Ishak, amassing 11 goals in the league. In total, Faris scored 21 goals and 21 assists in all competitions. He nominated for an S.League Player of the Year.

=== PKNS ===
On 5 January 2018, Faris signed a contract with Malaysia Super League club PKNS based in Shah Alam. He scored his first goal for his new club in a 3–4 defeat to Kedah FA. He finished his first season as joint-second top scorer for his team with 6 league goals.

=== Perlis ===
After speculations of a move to Perak, in January 2019, Faris signed a contract with newly promoted Malaysia Premier League club, Perlis. He was also linked up again with former PKNS teammates Safee Sali as well as Khyril Muhymeen, whom joined the club in December 2018. However, after revelation of Perlis financial difficulties and subsequent exclusion from the Malaysian league, Faris opted to terminate his contract in January 2019.

=== Hougang United ===
After Faris terminated his contract with Perlis, he returned to Singapore and signed with Singapore Premier League side, Hougang United on 7 February 2019. He made his debut in the opening match and scored his first goal in penalty against Tampines Rovers in a 5–1 defeat on 21 April 2019.

Faris was consistent in the year and was the top local-born goal scorer in the 2019 Singapore Premier League season, winning the Player of the Year award.

=== Terengganu ===
In January 2020, Faris signed for Malaysia Super League side Terengganu ahead of the 2020 season. On 29 August 2020, he scored his first league goal of the season in a 4–0 victory against Sabah. On 25 September 2020, he scored a brace in a 4–0 victory against PDRM. He made only 10 appearances before leaving the club.

=== Lion City Sailors ===
On 21 January 2021, Faris returned to Singapore to signed with Lion City Sailors after leaving Terengganu. He won the league title in his first season at the club.

Faris started off the 2022 season on a sour note as he missed out on the first game against Hougang United due to contracting COVID-19. It was only until the Sailors' 10th league match when manager Kim Do-Hoon gave Faris his first start of the season in the league. He scored his first goal of the season against Balestier Khalsa in June 2022 but remained largely used as a substitute until Kim left the club in August. His successor, Luka Lalić, also used Faris as a substitute in his first two games, in which Faris bagged 2 assists apiece. Faris managed to make the starting lineup in the next game against Hougang United, in which he scored 2 goals in a 9–4 thrashing victory. However, as the Sailors suffered a massive dip in form in the closing stages of the season, Faris, too, struggled badly, missing several crucial chances. In the penultimate round of the league, he was told that he would be leaving the Sailors next season. Faris managed to score a brace against Young Lions on the final day of the 2022 season, ending off his 2022 league campaign with the Sailors with just 5 goals.

In the domestic cup tournament Faris scored in the first cup match against Balestier Khalsa. However, the Sailors were knocked out at the group stage after a defeat against Albirex Niigata (S).

Faris scored against Borussia Dortmund in a friendly match which was considered a farewell goal.

=== Tampines Rovers ===
On 18 January 2023, Faris signed for Tampines Rovers ahead of the 2023 season. In his first 4 games with Tampines, he has been in the starting 11 and has scored a goal in each of the consecutive four matches.

On 24 May 2024, Faris scored his 100th professional career goal in a 4–2 league win over Balestier Khalsa. On 3 October 2024, Faris scored against Hong Kong club Lee Man in the 2024–25 AFC Champions League Two group stage, helping Tampines Rovers to secure a 3–1 victory. Faris also scored twice against Tanjong Pagar United on 11 April 2025 in a 2–0 victory. He scored ten league goals and provided 12 assists as Tampines finished runners-up in the 2024–25 season.

On 27 November 2025, Faris scored in Tampines Rovers 5–3 victory over Kaya–Iloilo in the AFC Champions League Two, a result that helped the club secure qualification for the round of 16.

On 30 September 2026, Faris scored against Chinese club Shanghai Shenhua in the 2026–27 AFC Champions League Two group stage. He equalised in the 33rd minute with a deflected shot from the edge of the penalty area following a pass from Shah Shahiran. However, Tampines Rovers eventually lost the match 2–1 at the Shanghai Stadium.

== International career ==
Faris made his first international debut on 9 September 2014 against Hong Kong. He scored his first international goal against Cambodia on 17 November 2014 at the Yishun Stadium. By early March 2017, he had garnered 29 caps for Singapore.

In the 2016 AYA Bank Cup and the 2019 AIRMARINE Cup, Faris scored the only goal in both game against Myanmar and causeway rivals, Malaysia which see Singapore advancing to the final of the cup respectively.

In the 2020 AFF Championship, Faris made the front page for his stoppage-time penalty miss. Had Faris scored, Singapore would have defeated Indonesia and move on to the finals. However, the penalty miss ultimately caused 9-man Singapore to fall 4–2 to Indonesia after extra time, which caused some frustration amongst Singaporeans.

On 26 March 2023, Faris earned his 75th cap for Singapore against Macau at the Macau Olympic Complex Stadium.

In the 2022 AFF Championship, Faris failed to score despite two good opportunities against Laos, causing much widespread criticism for his playing style. While he managed to register his first goal of the tournament against Malaysia, Singapore would lose 4–1.

In March 2024, Faris returned to the national team after nearly a year where on 21 March 2024, he scored the equalizer goal during the 2026 FIFA World Cup qualification match against China 8 seconds later from kick off after China scored a goal.

== Others ==
=== Singapore Selection squad ===
He was selected as part of the Singapore Selection squad for The Sultan of Selangor's Cup to be held on 6 May 2017.

=== Selangor Selection squad ===
As a player of PKNS in the 2018 Malaysia Super League season, Faris was selected as part of the Selangor Selection squad for the 2018 Sultan of Selangor's Cup that was held at the Shah Alam Stadium. He came on as a substitute for his PKNS teammate, Zac Anderson on the 60th minute. Selangor eventually won the match 1–1 (5–3) on penalties after he scored the winning penalty.

== Career statistics ==
=== Club ===
As of match played 22 July 2024. Caps and goals may not be correct.

Club	Season	S.League		Singapore Cup		Singapore League Cup		Asia		Total	
Club	Season	Apps	Goals	Apps	Goals	Apps	Goals	Apps	Goals	Apps	Goals
Young Lions	2010	3	1	2	0	0	0	—		5	1
Young Lions	2011	25	3	0	0	0	0	—		25	3
Young Lions	2012	20	2	0	0	1	0	—		21	2
Young Lions	2014	3	1	0	0	0	0	—		3	1
Young Lions	Total	51	7	2	0	1	0	0	0	54	7
Club	Season	Malaysia Super League		Malaysia FA Cup		Malaysia Cup		Asia		Total	
LionsXII	2013	20	1	1	0	6	0	—		27	1
LionsXII	2014	22	4	2	1	8	1	—		32	6
LionsXII	2015	17	8	6	2	7	1	—		30	11
LionsXII	Total	59	13	9	3	21	2	0	0	89	18
Club	Season	S.League		Singapore Cup		Singapore League Cup		Asia		Total	
Home United	2016	15	5	1	0	0	0	—		16	5
Home United	2017	23	11	4	5	2	0	10	4	39	20
Home United	Total	38	16	5	5	2	0	10	4	55	25
Club	Season	Malaysia Super League		Malaysia FA Cup		Malaysia Cup		Asia		Total	
PKNS	2018	21	6	5	1	3	2	—		29	9
PKNS	Total	21	6	5	1	3	2	0	0	29	9
Club	Season	Malaysia Super League		Malaysia FA Cup		Malaysia Cup		Asia		Total	
Perlis	2019	0	0	0	0	0	0	—		0	0
Perlis	Total	0	0	0	0	0	0	0	0	0	0
Club	Season	S.League		Singapore Cup		Singapore League Cup		Asia		Total	
Hougang United	2019	24	16	3	1	0	0	—		27	17
Hougang United	Total	24	16	3	1	0	0	0	0	27	17
Club	Season	Malaysia Super League		Malaysia FA Cup		Malaysia Cup		Asia		Total	
Terengganu	2020	11	3	0	0	0	0	—		11	3
Terengganu	Total	11	3	0	0	0	0	0	0	11	3
Club	Season	S.League		Singapore Cup		Singapore League Cup		Asia		Total	
Lion City Sailors	2021	20	3	0	0	0	0	0	0	20	3
Lion City Sailors	2022	21	5	0	0	1	0	6	0	28	5
Lion City Sailors	Total	41	8	0	0	1	0	6	0	48	8
Tampines Rovers	2023	24	9	7	3	0	0	1	0	32	12
Tampines Rovers	2024–25	20	8	0	0	0	0	6	1	26	9
Tampines Rovers	Total	44	17	7	3	0	0	7	1	58	22
Career total		275	82	32	13	30	4	23	5	364	111

- Young Lions and LionsXII are ineligible for qualification to AFC competitions in their respective leagues.
- Young Lions withdrew from the 2011 and 2012 Singapore Cup, and the 2011 Singapore League Cup due to participation in AFC and AFF youth competitions.

=== International goals ===
As of match played 5 September 2019. Singapore score listed first, score column indicates score after each Ramli goal.

International goals by date, venue, cap, opponent, score, result and competition
No.	Date	Venue	Cap	Opponent	Score	Result	Competition
1	17 November 2014	Yishun Stadium, Singapore	9	Cambodia	2–1	4–2	Friendly
2	31 March 2015	Jalan Besar Stadium, Singapore	14	Guam	1–1	2–2	Friendly
3	13 October 2015	National Stadium, Singapore	18	Cambodia	1–0	2–1	2018 FIFA World Cup qualification
4	3 June 2016	Thuwunna Stadium, Yangon, Myanmar	20	Myanmar	1–0	1–0	2016 AYA Bank Cup
5	5 October 2017	Jassim Bin Hamad Stadium, Doha, Qatar	34	Qatar	1–2	1–3	Friendly
6	21 November 2018	National Stadium, Singapore	44	Timor-Leste	5–1	6–1	2018 AFF Championship
7	20 March 2019	Bukit Jalil National Stadium, Kuala Lumpur, Malaysia	46	Malaysia	1–0	1–0	2019 AIRMARINE Cup
8	8 June 2019	National Stadium, Singapore	48	Solomon Islands	1–0	4–3	Friendly
9	5 September 2019	National Stadium, Singapore	50	Yemen	2–2	2–2	2022 FIFA World Cup qualification
10	8 December 2021	National Stadium, Singapore	61	Philippines	2–0	2–1	2020 AFF Championship
11	3 January 2023	Bukit Jalil National Stadium, Kuala Lumpur, Malaysia	73	Malaysia	1–3	1–4	2022 AFF Championship
12	21 March 2024	National Stadium, Singapore	78	China	1–2	2–2	2026 FIFA World Cup qualification
13	26 March 2024	Tianjin Olympic Center, Tianjin, China	79	China	1–1	1–4	2026 FIFA World Cup qualification
14	11 December 2024	National Stadium, Singapore	84	Cambodia	1–0	2–1	2024 ASEAN Championship
15	17 December 2024	National Stadium, Singapore	85	Thailand	2–0	2–4	2024 ASEAN Championship

=== U23 International goals ===
Scores and results list Singapore's goal tally first.

No.	Date	Venue	Opponent	Score	Result	Competition
1.	12 July 2012	Kaharudin Stadium, Pekanbaru, Indonesia	Macau	3–0	3–0	2013 AFC U-22 Championship qualification
2.	17 September 2014	Hwaseong Stadium, Hwaseong, South Korea	Oman	2–3	3–3	2014 Asian Games
3.	4 June 2015	Jalan Besar Stadium, Singapore	Myanmar	1–1	1–2	2015 Southeast Asian Games
4.	8 June 2015	Jalan Besar Stadium, Singapore	Cambodia	2–0	3–1	2015 Southeast Asian Games
5.	5 December 2019	Rizal Memorial Stadium, Manila, Philippines	Brunei	4–0	7–0	2019 Southeast Asian Games
6.	5 December 2019	Rizal Memorial Stadium, Manila, Philippines	Brunei	5–0	7–0	2019 Southeast Asian Games

== Honours ==
=== Club ===
==== LionsXII ====
- Malaysia Super League: 2013
- FA Cup Malaysia: 2015

==== Lion City Sailors ====
- Singapore Premier League: 2021
- Singapore Community Shield: 2022

==== Tampines Rovers ====
- Singapore Community Shield: 2025

=== Individual ===
- Malaysia Super League: Best Asean Player of the Year: 2018
- Singapore Premier League Player of the Year: 2019
- Singapore Premier League Team of the Year: 2019
- Singapore Premier League Player of the Month: February/March 2023
