= Ken Ilsø =

Danish footballer (born 1986)

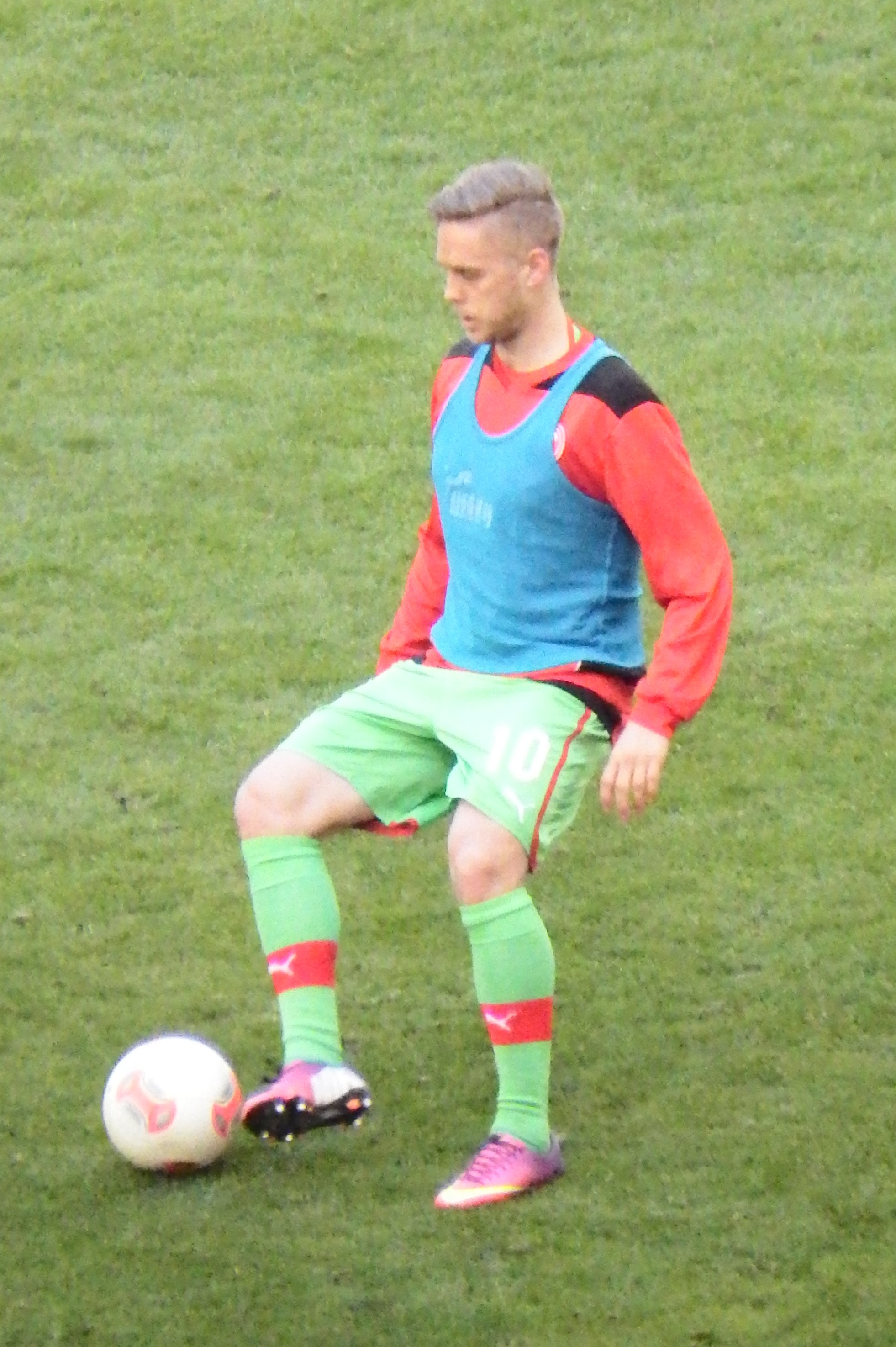
- Ilsø training with Fortuna Düsseldorf in 2012

Personal information
- Full name: Ken Ilsø Larsen
- Date of birth: 2 December 1986 (age 39)
- Place of birth: Solrød Strand, Denmark
- Height: 1.83 m (6 ft 0 in)
- Positions: Attacking midfielder; striker

Youth career
- BK Pioneren
- BK Friheden
- Kjøbenhavns Boldklub
- –2004: Boldklubben Frem
- 2004–2007: SC Heerenveen

Senior career*
Years	Team	Apps	(Gls)
2005–2008	SC Heerenveen	1	(0)
2006–2007	→ FC Zwolle (loan)	4	(1)
2008–2009	SønderjyskE	32	(9)
2009–2011	FC Midtjylland	39	(10)
2010–2011	→ Fortuna Düsseldorf (loan)	16	(7)
2011–2013	Fortuna Düsseldorf	55	(12)
2013–2014	VfL Bochum	16	(2)
2013–2014	VfL Bochum II	3	(2)
2014–2015	Guangzhou R&F	10	(2)
2015–2016	Home United	41	(30)
2017	Kedah	18	(15)
2018	Penang	6	(3)
2018–2019	Adelaide United	19	(3)

International career^{‡}
	Denmark U19	3	(0)
2006	Denmark U20	1	(0)
2008	Denmark U21	2	(0)
- * Club domestic league appearances and goals as of 21 March 2019 ‡ National team caps and goals as of 03:33, 26 September 2015 (UTC)

Ken Ilsø Larsen (born 2 December 1986) is a Danish former professional footballer who last played for Adelaide United in the A-League. He has previously represented Denmark at U19, U20 and U21 levels. Ilsø is also currently pursuing a Bachelor's degree in law at the University of Southern Denmark.

== Youth career ==
Born in Copenhagen, Ilsø started his footballing career at local amateur club BK Pioneren. He subsequently was joined by his brother Marco Ilsø, playing for several youth teams in Copenhagen. In 2004, he was signed as a youth player by Dutch side SC Heerenveen, after being labelled as one of Denmark's finest talents. On 16 April 2006, he made his senior team debut for SC Heerenveen, also his only senior appearance with the club, in an Eredivisie match against AZ Alkmaar as a 75th-minute substitute for teammate Arnold Bruggink.

== Club career ==
=== SC Heerenveen ===
Following his first-team debut with SC Heerenveen, Ilsø never managed to make another senior team appearance for the rest of his time at the club. He had a brief loan spell with FC Zwolle on-loan from SC Heerenveen, but did not make a single appearance for the Dutch club.

=== SønderjyskE ===
Unable to break into the first-team plans of SC Heerenveen, Ilsø returned in 2007 to Denmark, and joined local club SønderjyskE. He had a more successful spell with SønderjyskE, scoring 12 goals in 52 league matches for a side that was threatened by relegation.

=== FC Midtjylland ===
In summer 2009, Ilsø was signed by FC Midtjylland, who ended in the fourth spot of the Superliga the prior season. Ilsø quickly became an important player for FC Midtjylland. For instance, in the 2010–11 season opener against Silkeborg IF, Ilsø scored the decisive goal to earn a win for the club .

=== Fortuna Düsseldorf ===
Following his performance with FC Midtjylland, Ilsø joined 2. Bundesliga club Fortuna Düsseldorf on-loan in the 2010 winter transfer window. Fortuna Düsseldorf subsequently signed him permanently in the following year's summer transfer window, for a reported fee of €300,000.

By the end of the 2nd Bundesliga 2011–12 season, Fortuna Düsseldorf was in the 3rd place, and had to face Hertha BSC in the promotion/relegation play-off. Across both legs of the play-off, Ilsø assisted twice, once in each leg and therefore helped Fortuna to promote to the Bundesliga as the aggregate score of the play-off ended in a 4–3 win.

On 15 December 2012, in a Bundesliga match against Hannover 96, Ilsø played an integral role by scoring the decisive goal for Fortuna Düsseldorf to end the tie in a 2–1 victory. By the end of the Bundesliga 2012–13 season, Fortuna Düsseldorf was in the 17th placeand was relegated back to 2. Bundesliga after a single season in the top flight.

=== VfL Bochum ===
In the summer 2013 transfer window, a transfer deal was agreed, with Ilsø joining VfL Bochum from Fortuna Düsseldorf. Apart from playing for VfL Bochum's first team, Ilsø also made a single appearance for the club's reserve team, VfL Bochum II, in a Regionalliga West match against Sportfreunde Siegen.

=== Guangzhou R&F ===
In February 2014, Ilsø joined Chinese Super League side Guangzhou R&F, but he left the club after only three months due to a reduction in his playing time.

=== Home United ===
In January 2015, Ilsø signed a contract with Home United to play for the remainder of the season. Before he signed the contract, he attracted the interest of several clubs from his home country, as well as from Thailand, but Ilsø wanted to embark on an adventure far away from home. Ilsø ultimately decided to sign for Home United as he was impressed by the club's youth development philosophy.

Ilsø scored his first competitive goal for Home United just 23 minutes into his S.League debut. Ilsø scored his second goal for Home United in his second match, finding the back of the net from the spot. He continued his goalscoring start to the season by scoring his 3rd goal in the 3rd game of the season. He also laid on an assist for teammate Sirina Camara to secure his team's first win of the season over Tampines Rovers. Ilsø notched his 4th of the season in his 4th consecutive league match for Home United, scoring the first goal of a 2–2 draw against Brunei DPMM.

On 23 December 2015, it was confirmed by Home United that Ilsø will be staying with the club to participate in the 2016 S.League season.

Home United coach, Philippe Aw, was chosen to manage the Singapore Selection side for the 2016 Sultan of Selangor Cup. Ilsø was selected in the 18-man squad for the cup tie that took place at the Shah Alam Stadium on 7 May 2016. Ilsø featured for the entirety of the match which eventually ended 1–1 (3–4 on penalties) in a win for the Singapore Selection team.

In a S.League fixture against reigning champions Brunei DPMM, Ilsø scored 2 of Home United's 5 goals in an eventual 5–0 win, bringing his personal tally to a total of 6 goals in his last 5 competitive games. The win also represented Home United's fourth successive win in the S.League, last achieved by the club in the 2013 S.League season. Ilsø went on to extend his goal scoring streak to a record 8 goals in his last 7 league games after netting once each in S.League fixtures against Young Lions on 11 June 2016 and Albirex Niigata (S) on 18 June 2016.

On 22 November 2016, it was announced that Ilsø will not extend his stay at Home United beyond the 2016 S.League season, despite being offered a contract extension.

=== Kedah FA ===
Following speculation after his rejection of a contract renewal with Home United, Ilsø was confirmed to be on trial with the 2016 Malaysia Cup champions, Kedah FA, on 27 December 2016. It was later officially announced on 3 January 2017 that Ilsø had signed a one-year contract with the club to play for the entirety of the 2017 Malaysia Super League season, after impressing head coach Tan Cheng Hoe during the trial. Ilsø joins Kedah FA as the club's third foreign signing, linking up with Liridon Krasniqi of Kosovo, and Sandro da Silva Mendonça of Brazil.

=== Penang FA ===
On 16 January 2018, Ilsø signed a one-year contract with Malaysia Premier League side Penang. He terminated his contract with Penang by mutual consent on 18 May 2018. Ilso claimed that Penang have not paid him for three months from February 2018 and he will take the case to FIFA through the Denmark FA if he is not paid soon.

=== Adelaide United ===
On 6 July 2018, Ilsø signed a one-year deal with Australian A-League club Adelaide United. Ilsø made his debut in a friendly match against National Premier League side Para Hills Knights where he earned an assist in a 2–0 victory on 10 July 2018. Ilsø was suspended by Football Federation Australia (FFA) under its National Anti-Doping Policy after testing positive for cocaine. On 18 October 2019, FFA suspended Ilsø for 2 years after testing positive for Benzoylecgonine (metabolite of Cocaine). Shortly after this, Ilsø announced his immediate retirement from professional football.

== Career statistics ==
Appearances and goals by club, season and competition
Club	Season	League			Domestic Cup		Regional Cup		Other		Total	
Club	Season	Division	Apps	Goals	Apps	Goals	Apps	Goals	Apps	Goals	Apps	Goals
SC Heerenveen	2005–06	Eredivisie	1	0	0	0	0	0	1 (Note: Appearance in UEFA Cup play-offs)	0	1	0
SC Heerenveen	2006–07	Eredivisie	0	0	0	0	0	0	0	0	0	0
SC Heerenveen	2007–08	Eredivisie	0	0	0	0	0	0	0	0	0	0
SC Heerenveen	Total		1	0	0	0	0	0	0	0	1	0
FC Zwolle (loan)	2006–07	Eredivisie	0	0	0	0	—		—		0	0
SønderjyskE	2008–09	Superliga	28	9	1	0	—		—		29	9
SønderjyskE	2009–10	Superliga	4	0	0	0	—		—		4	0
SønderjyskE	Total		32	9	1	0	—		—		33	9
FC Midtjylland	2009–10	Superliga	25	6	4	1	—		—		29	7
FC Midtjylland	2010–11	Superliga	14	4	1	1	—		—		15	5
FC Midtjylland	Total		39	10	5	2	—		—		44	12
Fortuna Düsseldorf (loan)	2010–11	2.Bundesliga	16	7	0	0	—		—		16	7
Fortuna Düsseldorf	2011–12	2. Bundesliga	28	4	0	0	—		—		28	4
Fortuna Düsseldorf	2012–13	Bundesliga	27	2	2	0	—		—		29	2
Fortuna Düsseldorf	Total		71	13	2	0	—		—		73	13
VfL Bochum	2013–14	2.Bundesliga	16	2	1	0	—		—		17	2
VfL Bochum II	2013–14	Regionalliga West	1	0	0	0	—		—		1	0
Guangzhou R&F	2014	Chinese Super League	10	2	0	0	—		—		10	2
Home United	2015	S.League	19	11	5	2	1	0	—		25	13
Home United	2016	S.League	22	19	3	2	2	2	—		27	23
Home United	Total		41	30	8	4	3	2	—		52	36
Kedah	2017	Malaysia Super League	18	15	7	5	8	5	—		33	25
Penang	2018	Malaysia Premier League	6	3	0	0	0	0	—		6	3
Adelaide United	2018–19	A-League	19	3	5	0	0	0	—		24	3
Career total			229	81	24	11	11	7	1	0	265	99

== Honours ==
Midtjylland

- Danish Cup runner-up: 2010

Home United

- Singapore Cup runner-up: 2015

Kedah

- Malaysian Charity Cup: 2017
- FA Cup: 2017

Adelaide United

- FFA Cup: 2018
