= Adlane Messelem =

Algerian football manager

Personal information
- Place of birth: Algeria

Managerial career
- Years: Team
- 2005–2007: Lens (management and players adviser)
- 2014–2016: Home United FC (technical director)
- 2016–2017: Sabah FA

Adlane Messelem is an Algerian football manager who was last contracted to Sabah FA in Malaysia.

== Career ==
Part of Lens' backroom staff from 2005 until 2007, Messelem worked as a football negotiator for five years before being hired as technical director of Singaporean club Home United in 2014. In January 2017, Messelem was named as Sabah FA's sporting director and team manager of the professional team for the 2017 Malaysia Premier League season and sought to put discipline into his players. He also had plans to start a youth development program for the club and brought in Jonathan Behe, Soufiane Choubani, and Masaya Jitozono to fill the foreign players' slots.the team manager resigned the Malaysian outfit by 19 March, eight weeks after joining them.

In 2017, he launched a national trial in Algeria for student to send them study and play in USA.
