= Kamel Ramdani =

Algerian footballer (born 1980)

Personal information
- Date of birth: 21 November 1980 (age 45)
- Place of birth: Décines-Charpieu, France
- Height: 1.78 m (5 ft 10 in)
- Position: Midfielder

Team information
- Current team: GSI Pontivy
- Number: 10

Youth career
- –2003: FC Vaulx-en-Velin

Senior career*
Years	Team	Apps	(Gls)
2003–2006	FC Gueugnon	42	(4)
2006	USM Alger	7	(1)
2006–2007	SR Delémont	16	(0)
2007–2009	AS Beauvais Oise	69	(11)
2009–2011	Pacy Vallée-d'Eure	55	(13)
2010–2012	Paris FC	34	(0)
2012–2013	FC Montceau Bourgogne	3	(0)
2013–2015	Tanjong Pagar United	42	(15)
2015	Home United	26	(6)
2015–2016	GSI Pontivy	9	(1)
- * Club domestic league appearances and goals as of 00:27, 13 May 2016 (UTC)

Kamel Ramdani (born 21 November 1980) is a French former footballer who last played for Garde Saint-Ivy Pontivy in the Championnat de France Amateur, the fourth tier of French football.

== Club career ==
=== FC Vaulx en Velin ===
Ramdani began his interest in football during his early years spent in France, and joined FC Vaulx en Velin, an amateur football club known for producing great footballing talent, such as current Chelsea defender Kurt Zouma and his brother Lionel Zouma. FC Vaulx en Velin currently plays in the Championnat de France Amateur 2 league.

=== FC Gueugnon ===
Following his stay with FC Vaulx en Velin to build on his footballing career, Ramdani subsequently signed professionally with FC Gueugnon for the 2003–04 Ligue 2 season, making sixteen appearances in total for his debut season.

Ramdani went on to stay for two more seasons with FC Gueugnon, making forty two more competitive appearances in total with the club for the two seasons. Notably, on 10 September 2004, Ramdani scored his second goal for the club in a Ligue 2 match against Le Havre AC to snatch a 1–0 victory. He performed a similar feat again on 25 January 2005, scoring again to help FC Gueugnon record a 2–1 win over Le Mans FC.

=== USM Alger ===
After three relatively successful seasons with FC Gueugnon, Ramdani signed a two-year contract with Algerian side USM Alger on 31 July 2006. USM Alger plays in the Algerian Ligue Professionnelle 1, the top tier of football in Algeria. Ramdani mentioned in an interview following his arrival at USM Alger that he decided to join the Algerian team as he wanted to improve and bring another dimension to his football, and also win titles with his new club. USM Alger finished in fourth place that season, earning the club a second consecutive qualification to play in the 2007-08 Arab Champions League.

=== SR Delémont ===
Following a relatively unsuccessful spell with USM Alger in Algeria, Ramdani changed clubs again and spent the remainder of the 2006–07 season with Swiss club SR Delémont. SR Delémont plays in the Brack.ch Challenge League, the second tier of football in Switzerland. Ramdani managed to earn more game time as compared to when he was with USM Alger, making a total of sixteen appearances for the Swiss side, but did not score any goals during his time in Switzerland.

=== AS Beauvais Oise ===
After a turbulent period playing overseas, Ramdani returned to France, joining AS Beauvais Oise in the Championnat National. He made thirty four appearances in total for his debut season with AS Beauvais Oise, with a significant haul of six goals. In his second season, Ramdani achieved similar results, scoring five goals in thirty seven appearances before parting ways as he moved to Pacy Vallée-d'Eure at the end of the 2008–09 Championnat National season.

=== Pacy Vallée-d'Eure ===
With Pacy Vallée-d'Eure, Ramdani managed to reach his best form in his career for the 2009–10 Championnat National season. Ramdani made a total of thirty nine appearances in all competitions with the club, scoring a total of thirteen goals, averaging one goal in every three appearances. However, in his second season with the club, Ramdani's goal-scoring form dropped, only scoring a single goal in eighteen competitive appearances. Following his drop in form, he moved to Paris FC where he spent the remainder of the 2010–11 Championnat National season.

=== Paris FC ===
Ramdani's transfer to Paris FC represented his third club transfer in three years upon his return to French football. Despite a change in environment, Ramdani struggled to recreate the goal scoring form that he possessed during his first season with Pacy Vallée-d'Eure. By the end of the 2011–12 Championnat National season, Ramdani did not manage a single goal since his arrival midway through the 2010–11 Championnat National season. The deteriorating form of Ramdani saw him drop a tier back down to the Championnat de France Amateur the following season.

=== FC Montceau Bourgogne ===
Ramdani joined FC Montceau Bourgogne in a transfer from Paris FC, and only managed three competitive appearances with the Championnat de France Amateur club. Following yet another disappointing period, Ramdani finally moved overseas once again in a bid to rebuild his footballing career.

=== Tanjong Pagar United ===
Ramdani signed for Singaporean side Tanjong Pagar United for the remainder of the 2013 S.League season. With a change in environment, he made a total of twenty five league appearances with his new club, managing a total of ten goals. Ramdani stayed for another season with Tanjong Pagar United, before deciding to switch clubs to join S.League rivals Home United.

=== Home United ===
Ramdani signed for Home United for the 2015 S.League season following Tanjong Pagar United's withdrawal from the league. He made his debut for Home United in the Protectors' first match of the season. Ramdani scored his first competitive goal for Home in a 2–2 draw against Brunei DPMM FC, notching an equaliser to secure a point and maintain Home United's unbeaten run in the 2015 S.League after four games.

=== GSI Pontivy ===
Following the end of the 2015 S.League season, Ramdani returned to France and signed for Championnat de France Amateur side Garde Saint-Ivy Pontivy, wearing the No.10 shirt. Ramdani scored his first goal for the club in a match against Stade Rennais' reserve team on 5 March 2016 through a penalty. The match eventually concluded in a 2–1 loss with Ramdani's penalty the only goal for his side.

== International career ==
Ramdani was called up to the Algerian Olympic football team to participate in a qualifier back in 2004. However, upon arriving at the camp premises, the team officials realized that he was too old to participate.

== Honours ==
Home United

- Singapore League Cup: 2014 Runner-up
- Singapore Cup: 2013 Runner-up
