= Manuel Hiemer =

German footballer

Personal information
- Date of birth: 3 February 1985 (age 41)
- Place of birth: Augsburg, West Germany
- Height: 1.82 m (6 ft 0 in)
- Position: Midfielder

Youth career
- –2001: 1. FC Nürnberg
- 2001–2004: SpVgg Greuther Fürth

Senior career*
Years	Team	Apps	(Gls)
2004–2005	SpVgg Greuther Fürth II	28	(5)
2005–2006	TSV Aindling	30	(3)
2006–2007	FC Ingolstadt 04	1	(0)
2007–2009	SSV Jahn Regensburg	59	(1)
2009–2011	Erzgebirge Aue	23	(0)
2011–2012	BC Aichach	20	(5)
2012–2014	SpVgg Bayreuth	71	(23)
2015–2016	DJK Ammerthal	11	(3)
2016	Würzburger FV	0	(0)
2016–2017	SV Mering	7	(1)
2017–2019	Türkspor Augsburg	30	(6)
Total		280	(47)
- * Club domestic league appearances and goals as of 1 January 2019

Manuel Hiemer (born 3 February 1985) is a German retired footballer.
